= 2008 Green Bay Packers season =

NFL team season

- General manager: Ted Thompson
- Head coach: Mike McCarthy
- Home stadium: Lambeau Field

Results
- Record: 6–10
- Division place: 3rd NFC North
- Playoffs: Did not qualify
- All-Pros: 2: CB Charles Woodson (2nd team); S Nick Collins (2nd team)
- Pro Bowlers: 3: CB Charles Woodson; CB Al Harris; FS Nick Collins

Uniform

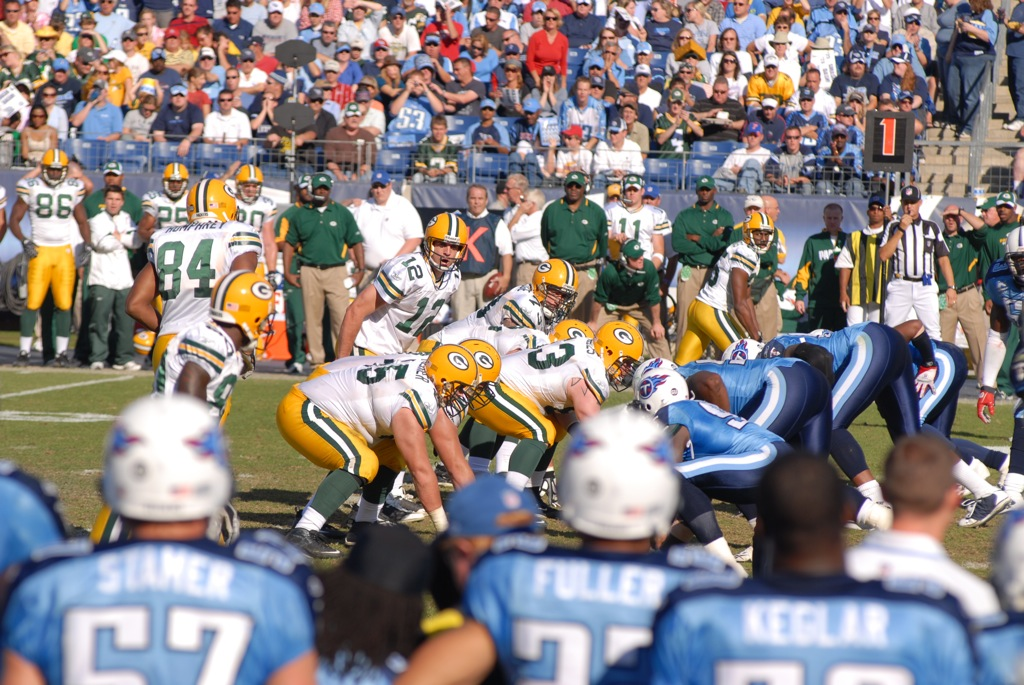
Aaron Rodgers and the Packers offense at Tennessee, November 2, 2008

The 2008 season was the Green Bay Packers' 88th season in the National Football League (NFL), their 90th overall and their 3rd under head coach Mike McCarthy. The Packers were aiming to improve their 13–3 record from last season, but finished the season with a 6–10 record and missed the playoffs. Until the 2017 season, this was the last season in which the Packers did not qualify for the playoffs.

It was the first season since 1991 that quarterback Brett Favre was not on the team's roster. Favre retired in March, decided to come back over the summer and was ultimately traded to the New York Jets after the team told Favre playing in Green Bay again was not an option. It was the first season with quarterback Aaron Rodgers as the team's starter.

== Offseason ==
=== Departures ===
- On February 20, tight end Bubba Franks was released.
- On February 29, wide receiver Carlyle Holiday was released.
- On March 1, after the Packers declared him a franchise player on February 20, defensive tackle Corey Williams was traded to the Cleveland Browns for a second round pick in the draft.
- On March 4, quarterback Brett Favre retired.
- On March 13, the Baltimore Ravens signed cornerback Frank Walker to a contract.
- On March 26, longsnapper Rob Davis retired.
- On May 9, wide receiver Koren Robinson was released.
- On May 19, the Houston Texans signed tight end Ryan Krause to a contract.
- On June 5, offensive tackle Joe Toledo was released.
- On July 23, offensive guard Cameron Stephenson was released.
- On July 24, punter Ken DeBauche, linebacker Marcus Riley and cornerback Kyle Ward were released.
- On July 26, tight end Mike Peterson was released.
- On August 2, long snapper Thomas Gafford was released.
- On August 6, after he came out of retirement, Brett Favre was traded to the New York Jets for a conditional 4th round pick.
- On August 25, running back DeShawn Wynn, running back Ryan Powdrell, wide receiver Chris Francies and offensive tackle Ryan Considine were released to reach the NFL-mandated 75 player limit.
- On August 30, running backs Vernand Morency and Noah Herron, fullback Corey White, wide receivers Jake Allen, Taj Smith, Brett Swain and Johnny Quinn, tight end Joey Haynos, guards Ryan Keenan, Brennan Carvalho and Orrin Thompson, defensive tackles Conrad Bolston, Alfred Malone and Daniel Muir, linebackers Spencer Havner and Danny Lansanah, and cornerbacks Scorpio Babers, Tyrone Culver and Joe Porter were released to reach the NFL-mandated 53 player limit.
- On September 1, linebacker Abdul Hodge and punter Jon Ryan were released.

=== Additions ===
- On February 28, former Miami Dolphins offensive tackle Joe Toledo was signed to a contract.
- On February 28, former Seattle Seahawks long snapper Thomas Gafford was signed to a contract.
- On March 20, former St. Louis Rams linebacker Brandon Chillar was signed to a 2-year contract.
- On August 4, retired reserve quarterback Brett Favre was reinstated and added to the active roster.
- On August 8, the Packers signed free agent cornerback Scorpio Babers to a contract.
- On August 19, the Packers signed free agent defensive end Rodney Allen to a contract.
- On September 1, the Packers signed punter Derrick Frost and long snapper Brett Goode to contracts.

=== Training camp and preseason injuries ===
- On July 28, wide receiver Shaun Bodiford was placed on Injured Reserve with a back injury.
- On August 19, tight end Evan Moore was placed on Injured Reserve with a knee injury.
- On August 25, defensive tackle Justin Harrell was placed on the Physically Unable to Perform (PUP) list with a back injury.
- On August 30, long snapper J. J. Jansen was placed on Injured Reserve with a LCL injury.
- On August 30, guard Orrin Thompson was placed on Injured Reserve.
- On August 30, defensive tackle Rodney Allen was placed on Injured Reserve.

=== Free agents ===
Position	Player	Free agency tag	Date signed	2008 team
QB	Craig Nall	UFA	November 5	Houston Texans
RB	Ryan Grant	ERFA	August 2	Green Bay Packers
RB	Vernand Morency	RFA	April 4	Green Bay Packers
FB	John Kuhn	ERFA	March 19	Green Bay Packers
WR	Carlyle Holiday	ERFA	February 29	Released
WR	Ruvell Martin	ERFA	March 31	Green Bay Packers
TE	Tory Humphrey	ERFA	March 19	Green Bay Packers
TE	Ryan Krause	UFA	May 19	Houston Texans
G	Tyson Walter	UFA		
DT	Colin Cole	RFA	April 17	Green Bay Packers
DT	Corey Williams	UFA	March 1	Cleveland Browns
LB	Tracy White	UFA	March 25	Green Bay Packers
CB	Frank Walker	UFA	March 13	Baltimore Ravens
SS	Atari Bigby	ERFA	March 20	Green Bay Packers
LS	Rob Davis	UFA	March 26	Retired
RFA: Restricted free agent, UFA: Unrestricted free agent, ERFA: Exclusive rights free agent

=== Favre retirement, reinstatement and trade ===
On March 6, 2008, Favre formally announced his retirement. Favre's agent, James "Bus" Cook, stated "Nobody pushed Brett Favre out the door but then nobody encouraged him not to go out that door either. I don't think he had a lot of encouragement to stay, but nobody told him to leave either." Cook also believed that Favre had not gotten the impression from the Packers that they wanted him back. Although Favre stated that he had been willing to play another year, he felt that another season would only be successful if he led his team to another Super Bowl victory. At his press conference, Favre openly wept about leaving the NFL. He stated that his decision, regardless of what was being said in the media, had nothing to do with what the Packers did or did not do. He said, seemingly contradictory to Cook's statements, that his decision to retire was based on the fact that he did not want to play anymore. He said during the conference, "I know I can play, but I don't think I want to. And that's really what it comes down to." But since he had to make his decision right there and then he felt that he needed to retire. He was eligible for the Pro Football Hall of Fame in 2013. The Packers also planned to retire Favre's No. 4 jersey during their regular season opener against the Minnesota Vikings on September 8. Favre appeared on the cover of the Madden NFL 09 video game, released on August 13, 2008.

Favre has stated that if the Packers asked him to return in an emergency situation, that "it would be hard to pass up." He stressed, however, that he would only return if he was in shape.

On July 2, 2008, it was reported that Favre was in contact with the Packers about a possible return to the team. On July 11, 2008, Favre sent a letter to the Packers asking for his unconditional release to allow him to play for another NFL team. Packers general manager Ted Thompson announced he would not grant Favre an unconditional release and reaffirmed the organization's commitment to Aaron Rodgers as its new quarterback. Complicating matters was Favre's unique contract giving him the leverage to void any potential trade by not reporting to the camp of the team he might be traded to if the Packers elect to go that route.

Favre spoke publicly for the first time about his potential comeback in a July 14, 2008 interview with Greta Van Susteren on the Fox News Channel's On the Record with Greta Van Susteren. In the interview, Favre said he was "guilty of retiring early," that he was "never fully committed" to retirement, and that he was pressured by the Packers to make a decision before the NFL draft and the start of the free agent signing period. Favre disputed the notion that he did not want to play for Green Bay and said that while he understands the organization has decided to move on, they should now allow him to do the same. He made clear that he would not return to the Packers as a backup and reiterated his desire to be released rather than traded, which would allow him the freedom to play for a competitive team. Favre also accused the Packers of being dishonest, wishing the team would have been straightforward with him and the public.

In the second part of the interview, which aired on July 15, Favre expressed his frustration with Packer management, spoke of his sympathy for successor Aaron Rodgers' predicament, and affirmed he is 100 percent committed to playing football in 2008. On July 16, Favre's agent, James "Bus" Cook, stated Favre has "no definite plans to seek reinstatement" and that "It's [the Packers] move." Cook reasoned that applying for reinstatement at this time would give Green Bay the opportunity to activate Favre, relegate him to a backup role he is unwilling to accept, and fine him $15,000 a day for failing to report to training camp.

FOXSports.com's Jay Glazer reported on July 16, 2008, that the Packers filed tampering charges against the Minnesota Vikings with the league office, alleging improper communication between Vikings offensive coordinator Darrell Bevell and Favre, although one source suggested that Favre may have been in contact with Vikings head coach Brad Childress. After an investigation, Commissioner Roger Goodell ruled there had been no violation of tampering rules.

Favre formally filed for reinstatement with the NFL on July 29, 2008, and his petition was granted by Commissioner Goodell, effective August 4, 2008. Favre then flew to Green Bay to report to Packers training camp. After a lengthy meeting with head coach Mike McCarthy and general manager Ted Thompson, however, both sides agreed it was time for Favre and the organization to part ways. McCarthy sensed Favre was not in "the right mind-set" to resume playing for the Packers, while Favre felt that his relationship with Packer management had deteriorated to the point that a return to the team would be untenable.

After the Packers entered into trade discussions with both the Tampa Bay Buccaneers and New York Jets, Favre was traded to the Jets on August 6, 2008 for a conditional draft pick.

=== Draft ===
The Packers held Pick 30 in the NFL draft but traded it to the New York Jets for picks 36 and 113. In the second round they selected wide receiver Jordy Nelson of Kansas State with pick 36, quarterback Brian Brohm of Louisville with pick 56 and cornerback Pat Lee of Auburn with pick 60.

During day 2 of the NFL draft, The Packers started off their day pick tight end Jermichael Finley of Texas with pick 91.

In the fourth round, the Packers traded picks 113 and 162 to the New York Jets for pick 102. They then used that pick to select defensive end Jeremy Thompson of Wake Forest. The Packers then traded pick 128 to the St Louis Rams for picks 137 and 217. They then used pick 135 to select offensive guard Josh Sitton of the UCF Knights.

In the 5th round they traded pick 137 to the Minnesota Vikings for picks 150 and 209. With pick 150 the Packers selected offensive tackle Breno Giacomini of Louisville.

After waiting for the 6th round to pass in which the Packers did not hold any picks, they finished their draft by selecting quarterback Matt Flynn of LSU and wide receiver Brett Swain of San Diego State with picks 209 and 217 respectively. They traded pick 237 to the New Orleans Saints for their 6th round pick of the 2009 NFL draft.

2008 Green Bay Packers draft
Round	Pick	Player	Position	College	Notes
2	36	Jordy Nelson *	WR	Kansas St	
2	56	Brian Brohm	QB	Louisville	
2	60	Pat Lee	CB	Auburn	
3	91	Jermichael Finley	TE	Texas	
4	102	Jeremy Thompson	DE	Wake Forest	
4	135	Josh Sitton *	OG	Central Florida	
5	150	Breno Giacomini	OT	Louisville	
7	209	Matt Flynn	QB	LSU	
7	217	Brett Swain	WR	San Diego St	
Made roster † Pro Football Hall of Fame * Made at least one Pro Bowl during career

==== Undrafted free agents ====
Following the 2008 NFL draft, the Packers signed 11 undrafted free agents. They were:

- Wide receiver Jake Allen (Mississippi College)
- Center Brennan Carvalho (Portland State)
- Punter Ken DeBauche (Wisconsin)
- Wide receiver Rod Harper (Murray State)
- Tight end Joey Haynos (Maryland)
- Long snapper J. J. Jansen (Notre Dame)
- Linebacker Danny Lansanah (UConn)
- Runningback Kregg Lumpkin (Georgia)
- Tight end Mike Peterson (Northwest Missouri State)
- Linebacker Marcus Riley (Fresno State)
- Wide receiver Taj Smith (Syracuse)

On May 7, the Packers signed Cornerback Condrew Allen (Portland State), Offensive tackle Ryan Considine (Louisiana Tech) and Cornerback Kyle Ward (Louisiana-Lafayette) after they attended a minicamp on a tryout basis. On May 22, the Packers also signed Evan Moore (Stanford).

=== Training camp ===
The Packers held their training camp sessions at Clarke Hinkle Field across the street from Lambeau Field. Practices were moved inside the Don Hutson Center during inclement weather. St. Norbert College served as the team base for all living arrangements for the 51st consecutive season. Players were expected to report on July 27, and practices commenced the following day and continued through August 27. Throughout the thirty one day span, seventeen included public practices. For the third straight year, night practices were again a part of the training camp schedule under Head Coach Mike McCarthy. Seven night practices, all beginning at 6:30 p.m., were scheduled.

During the first day of practice, Brett Favre did not file his reinstatement papers and did not appear at camp. Favre told GM Ted Thompson he would give him a couple of days to work out a trade before he reported. The only player on the active roster absent was RB Ryan Grant who was going through a contract dispute. All of the 2008 draft class was signed by the start of camp and participated.

After the first day McCarthy stated that he thought the evening practice was sloppy, as the morning practice was. There again were many penalties before the snap. That is no surprise on Day 1, though. "As a whole, I thought the pad level was high on both sides of the ball. I thought the footwork was sloppy. It looked like we were in mud at times. So, we'll look at the film." The pace of the practice was excellent—14 minutes ahead of schedule.

During the evening practice on July 29, the Packers got word that Brett Favre had submitted him papers for reinstatement.

On Wednesday, July 29, ESPN's NFL Live was broadcasting from Packers camp. Much of the broadcast circled around Brett Favre's return to football with minor focus on Aaron Rodgers performance as well as Ryan Grant and his current contract holdout situation.

On Thursday, the Packers did not have a formal practice but the team was addressed in the afternoon by former White House press secretary Ari Fleischer. During the late afternoon, it was reported by ESPN that Brett Favre had chartered a flight to Green Bay and would arrive later in the day in time to attend camp on Friday. After a series of delays, the flight was canceled and Favre did not fly to Green Bay.

On Saturday, August 2, it was announced that Ryan Grant came to terms with a four-year deal that could be worth as much as $30 million. Ryan Grant was in attendance for the 2008 Family Night scrimmage on Sunday August 3 but did not participate. A few hours before the scrimmage had taken place, quarterback Brett Favre was officially reinstated by NFL Commissioner Roger Goodell and landed in Wisconsin.

On Monday, August 4, Brett Favre was officially added to the Packers active roster and it was announced that he would now compete against Aaron Rodgers for the Packers starting quarterback job. After a long conversation with Mike McCarthy over the next couple of days, McCarthy felt that Favre was not committed to the team and they began working out a trade.

After Brett Favre was traded to the New York Jets, new starting quarterback Aaron Rodgers became the target of heckling by several disgruntled fans at training camp for the next couple of days.

After the Packers preseason game on August 11, it was apparent that second string rookie quarterback Brian Brohm was in danger of being passed on the depth chart by another rookie quarterback, Matt Flynn due to Brian's lack of success in the preseason contest.

Another camp battle that had emerged is one between rookie offensive guard Josh Sitton, Daryn Colledge and Allen Barbre for the starting left guard spot. Josh Sitton replaced right guard Jason Spitz in training camp due to Spitz being moved over to center in place of the injured Scott Wells. Sitton played so well in camp and in the first preseason game that he is now still taking reps with the first string offense at left guard even after the return of center Scott Wells.

==== Family night scrimmage ====
On August 3, Lambeau Field held a full pads inter-team scrimmage that was delayed by rain and lightning. The scrimmage finally started around 8:00 p.m. CST in front of 56,600 in attendance.

Head Coach Mike McCarthy has talked about the defense being the starting point and common thread that will run through the team in 2008, and on Sunday night, several members of the secondary made an impact. "As a whole, I thought their production was outstanding," McCarthy said of the defense. "I really thought they flew to the ball. It looked to me, from not studying it, it looked like they did a good job with the bump at the line of scrimmage, disrupting the routes. I thought the defense had a very good night."

Rookie cornerback Pat Lee led the team with four passes defensed, Cornerback Tramon Williams, who missed a good part of practice this week with a hip flexor injury, was back on the field and posted two pass breakups, both on third down plays. Safety Charlie Peprah made his presence felt with three tackles and a pass breakup, as well as one of the bigger hits of the night. Safety Aaron Rouse posted the lone takeaway of the night when he intercepted a desperation heave by Rodgers to the back of the end zone intended for Jennings as time ticked away in the two-minute drill.

One area that impressed on Sunday night was the punt return game for the Packers. Rookie wide receiver Brett Swain was credited with two returns for 80 yards, including a 66-yarder. He wasn't the only player to post a big play during the special teams work, with cornerback Will Blackmon recording a 56-yard return. Also, Punter Jon Ryan averaged 54.8 yards on his four punts.

Most of the team participated with exception of running back Ryan Grant, and cornerbacks Al Harris and Charles Woodson. All three were healthy but did not participate. Brett Favre also was not in attendance due to the fact that he was just reinstated back into the NFL earlier in the day.

Six other players did not participate due to injury. This list included defensive tackles Justin Harrell (knee) and Ryan Pickett (back), running back DeShawn Wynn (concussion), cornerback Condrew Allen (knee), center Scott Wells (trunk) and defensive end Kabeer Gbaja-Biamila (knee).

== Final roster ==
Green Bay Packers 2008 final roster
Quarterbacks: 11 Brian Brohm; 10 Matt Flynn; 12 Aaron Rodgers; Running backs: 25 Ryan Grant; 35 Korey Hall FB; 32 Brandon Jackson; 30 John Kuhn FB; 42 DeShawn Wynn; Wide receivers: 80 Donald Driver; 85 Greg Jennings; 89 James Jones; 82 Ruvell Martin; 87 Jordy Nelson; Tight ends: 88 Jermichael Finley; 84 Tory Humphrey; 86 Donald Lee	Offensive linemen: 78 Allen Barbre OT; 76 Chad Clifton OT; 73 Daryn Colledge G; 68 Breno Giacomini OT; 67 Nevin McCaskill G; 75 Tony Moll G; 71 Josh Sitton G; 72 Jason Spitz G; 63 Scott Wells C; Defensive linemen: 90 Colin Cole DT; 94 Kabeer Gbaja-Biamila DE; 91 Justin Harrell DT; 57 Jason Hunter DE; 97 Johnny Jolly DT; 74 Aaron Kampman DE; 98 Alfred Malone DT; 96 Michael Montgomery DE; 79 Ryan Pickett DT; 99 Jeremy Thompson DE	Linebackers: 55 Desmond Bishop MLB; 54 Brandon Chillar OLB; 53 Spencer Havner OLB; 50 A. J. Hawk OLB; 58 Danny Lansanah OLB; 51 Brady Poppinga OLB; 59 Tracy White OLB; Defensive backs: 27 Will Blackmon CB; 24 Jarrett Bush CB; 36 Nick Collins FS; 31 Al Harris CB; 26 Charlie Peprah SS; 40 Joe Porter CB; 37 Aaron Rouse SS; 38 Tramon Williams CB; 21 Charles Woodson CB; Special teams: 2 Mason Crosby K; 61 Brett Goode LS; 7 Jeremy Kapinos P	Reserve lists: 56 Nick Barnett MLB (IR); 20 Atari Bigby S (IR); 19 Shaun Bodiford WR (IR); 46 J. J. Jansen LS (IR); 77 Cullen Jenkins DE (IR); 22 Pat Lee CB (IR); 28 Kregg Lumpkin RB (IR); 44 Evan Moore TE (IR); 93 Kenny Pettway DE (IR); 65 Mark Tauscher OT (IR); Practice squad: 41 Joshua Abrams CB; 13 Jake Allen WR; 95 Fred Bledsoe DT; 8 Durant Brooks P; 64 Brennen Carvalho C; 18 Lorne Sam WR; 16 Brett Swain WR; 69 Anthony Toribio DT; 48 Russ Weil FB; rookies in italics 53 active, 10 inactive, 8 practice squad

== Staff ==
Green Bay Packers 2008 staff
Front office: Executive committee – Board of Directors; Chairman/CEO – Mark Murphy; Executive vice president/general manager/director of football operations – Ted Thompson; Vice president of football administration/player finance – Russ Ball; Director of football operations – Reggie McKenzie; Director of football operations – John Schneider; Director of college scouting – John Dorsey; Assistant director of college scouting – Shaun Herock; Assistant director of pro personnel – Eliot Wolf; Assistant director of pro personnel – Tim Terry; Head coaches: Head coach – Mike McCarthy; Assistant head coach/linebackers – Winston Moss; Offensive coaches: Offensive coordinator – Joe Philbin; Quarterbacks – Tom Clements; Running backs – Edgar Bennett; Wide receivers – Jimmy Robinson; Tight ends – Ben McAdoo; Offensive line – James Campen; Assistant offensive line – Jerry Fontenot; Offensive quality control – Ty Knott	Defensive coaches: Defensive coordinator – Bob Sanders; Defensive ends – Carl Hairston; Defensive tackles – Robert Nunn; Secondary – Kurt Schottenheimer; Defensive nickel package/cornerbacks – Lionel Washington; Defensive quality control – Joe Whitt Jr.; Special teams coaches: Special teams coordinator – Mike Stock; Assistant special teams – Shawn Slocum; Strength and conditioning: Strength and conditioning – Rock Gullickson; Assistant strength and conditioning – Mark Lovat; Strength and conditioning assistant – Mondray Gee

== Transactions ==
- On September 24, practice squad TE Joey Haynos was signed to the Miami Dolphins 53 man roster terminating his practice squad contract with the Packers.
- On September 24, the Packers signed DT Fred Bledsoe to their practice squad.
- On September 30, the Packers signed former Jacksonville Jaguars DE Kenny Pettway to their active roster.
- On October 1, the Packers placed DE Cullen Jenkins on injured reserve with a torn pectoral muscle.
- On October 7, the Packers released LB Tracy White and signed practice squad LB Danny Lansanah to their active roster.
- On October 8, the Packers signed DE Rudolph Hardie to their practice squad.
- On October 11 the Packers placed RB Kregg Lumpkin on injured reserve with a hamstring injury.
- On October 11, the Packers signed RB DeShawn Wynn to their active roster.
- On October 15, the Packers signed LB Spencer Havner to their practice squad.
- On October 20, the Packers released DE Rudolph Hardie from their practice squad.
- On October 27, the Packers signed CB Kennard Cox to their practice squad.
- On November 1, the Packers released DE Kabeer Gbaja-Biamila and activated DT Justin Harrell off of the PUP list.
- On November 13, the Packers released DT Fred Bledsoe from their practice squad and replaced him with DT Anthony Toribio.
- On December 1, the Packers released P Derrick Frost and placed both LB Nick Barnett and DE Kenny Pettway on injured reserve.
- On December 1, the Packers signed practice squad DT Alfred Malone and CB Joe Porter to their active roster.
- On December 3, the Packers signed P Jeremy Kapinos to their active roster and signed WR Lorne Sam to their practice squad.
- On December 5, the Packers placed CB Pat Lee on injured reserve with a knee injury.
- On December 5, the Packers signed practice squad LB Spencer Havner to their active roster.
- On December 8, practice squad CB Kennard Cox was signed to the Jacksonville Jaguars 53 man roster terminating his practice squad contract with the Packers.
- On December 10, the Packers signed CB Joshua Abrams, RB Steven Korte and DT Fred Bledsoe to their practice squad.
- On December 11, the Packers placed OT Mark Tauscher on injured reserve with a torn ACL.
- On December 11, the Packers signed G Nevin McCaskill from the Philadelphia Eagles practice squad to their active roster.
- On December 15, the Packers signed P Durant Brooks to their practice squad and RB Steven Korte of their practice squad was released.
- On December 18, the Packers placed SS Atari Bigby on injured reserve with a shoulder injury.
- On December 18, the Packers signed DT Anthony Toribio of their practice squad to the active roster and signed FB Russ Weil to their practice squad.

== Preseason ==
=== Schedule ===
Week	Date	Opponent	Result	Record	Venue	Recap
1	August 11	Cincinnati Bengals	L 17–20	0–1	Lambeau Field	Recap
2	August 16	at San Francisco 49ers	L 6–34	0–2	Candlestick Park	Recap
3	August 22	at Denver Broncos	W 27–24	1–2	Invesco Field at Mile High	Recap
4	August 28	Tennessee Titans	L 21–23	1–3	Lambeau Field	Recap

== Regular season ==
=== Schedule ===
Week	Date	Opponent	Result	Record	Vennue	Recap
1	September 8	Minnesota Vikings	W 24–19	1–0	Lambeau Field	Recap
2	September 14	at Detroit Lions	W 48–25	2–0	Ford Field	Recap
3	September 21	Dallas Cowboys	L 16–27	2–1	Lambeau Field	Recap
4	September 28	at Tampa Bay Buccaneers	L 21–30	2–2	Raymond James Stadium	Recap
5	October 5	Atlanta Falcons	L 24–27	2–3	Lambeau Field	Recap
6	October 12	at Seattle Seahawks	W 27–17	3–3	Qwest Field	Recap
7	October 19	Indianapolis Colts	W 34–14	4–3	Lambeau Field	Recap
8	Bye					
9	November 2	at Tennessee Titans	L 16–19 (OT)	4–4	LP Field	Recap
10	November 9	at Minnesota Vikings	L 27–28	4–5	Hubert H. Humphrey Metrodome	Recap
11	November 16	Chicago Bears	W 37–3	5–5	Lambeau Field	Recap
12	November 24	at New Orleans Saints	L 29–51	5–6	Louisiana Superdome	Recap
13	November 30	Carolina Panthers	L 31–35	5–7	Lambeau Field	Recap
14	December 7	Houston Texans	L 21–24	5–8	Lambeau Field	Recap
15	December 14	at Jacksonville Jaguars	L 16–20	5–9	Jacksonville Municipal Stadium	Recap
16	December 22	at Chicago Bears	L 17–20 (OT)	5–10	Soldier Field	Recap
17	December 28	Detroit Lions	W 31–21	6–10	Lambeau Field	Recap

== Standings ==
NFC North
	W	L	T	PCT	DIV	CONF	PF	PA	STK
^{(3)} Minnesota Vikings	10	6	0	.625	4–2	8–4	379	333	W1
Chicago Bears	9	7	0	.563	4–2	7–5	375	350	L1
Green Bay Packers	6	10	0	.375	4–2	5–7	419	380	W1
Detroit Lions	0	16	0	.000	0–6	0–12	268	517	L16

== Game summaries ==
=== Week 1 ===
Team	1	2	3	4	Total
Vikings	0	3	3	13	19
• Packers	0	10	7	7	24

- Date: September 8
- Location: Lambeau Field, Green Bay, Wisconsin
- Game start: 7:00 p.m. EST
- Game attendance: 71,004
- Game weather: Mostly cloudy, 58 °F (14 °C)
- Referee: Jeff Triplette
- TV announcers (ESPN): Mike Tirico, Ron Jaworski, Tony Kornheiser, and Michele Tafoya

Scoring summary
Q2	13:35	MIN	Ryan Longwell 37 yard field goal	MIN 3–0
Q2	10:07	GB	Korey Hall 1 yard pass from Aaron Rodgers (Mason Crosby kick)	GB 7–3
Q2	3:21	GB	Mason Crosby 42 yard field goal	GB 10–3
Q3	10:52	MIN	Ryan Longwell 27 yard field goal	GB 10–6
Q3	6:35	GB	Will Blackmon 76 yard punt return (Mason Crosby kick)	GB 17–6
Q4	14:12	MIN	Sidney Rice 23 yard pass from Tarvaris Jackson (Ryan Longwell kick)	GB 17–13
Q4	6:03	GB	Aaron Rodgers 1 yard run (Mason Crosby kick)	GB 24–13
Q4	2:39	MIN	Adrian Peterson 3 yard run (Ryan Longwell kick)	GB 24–20

The Packers began their 2008 campaign at home against their NFC North foe, the Minnesota Vikings, in the first game of 2008's Monday Night Football doubleheader. Green Bay struggled early to move the ball, but a 56-yard Aaron Rodgers pass to Greg Jennings set the Packers up with a 1st and goal at the Vikings 6. The Packers scored 4 plays later on a 3rd down pass from Aaron Rodgers to fullback Korey Hall. Punt returner Will Blackmon also scored in the 3rd quarter on a 76-yard punt return to give the Packers a commanding 17–6 lead. Later in the 3rd, the Vikings scored a TD paired with a failed 2-point conversion attempt. The Packers responded with a 57-yard run by Ryan Grant to the Minnesota 2 that set up a 1-yard touchdown rush by Aaron Rodgers to make the score 24–12. The Vikings Adrian Peterson scored a 3-yard rushing touchdown on their next drive to bring the Packers lead back to 5 points with 2:43 left in the 4th quarter. The following Vikings onside kick was knocked out of bounds after touching safety Atari Bigby. The Packers then went three and out and punted the ball back to the Vikings with 2 minutes left. Vikings quarterback Tarvaris Jackson was later intercepted by Atari Bigby which sealed the victory for the Packers as they started out the season at 1–0. Will Blackmon was named NFC Special Teams Player of the Week.

=== Week 2 ===
Team	1	2	3	4	Total
• Packers	7	14	3	24	48
Lions	0	3	6	16	25

- Date: September 14
- Location: Ford Field, Detroit Michigan
- Game start: 1:00 p.m. EST
- Game attendance: 60,285
- Game weather: indoors (dome)
- Referee: Walt Coleman
- TV announcers (Fox): Matt Vasgersian, J.C. Pearson, and Charissa Thompson

Coming off an impressive divisional home win over the Vikings, the Packers flew to Ford Field for a Week 2 NFC North showdown with the Detroit Lions. In the first quarter, Green Bay got the first strike with QB Aaron Rodgers completing a 9-yard TD pass to WR James Jones. In the second quarter, the Packers increased their lead with Rodgers completing a 2-yard TD pass to WR Donald Driver and a 29-yard TD pass to rookie WR Jordy Nelson. The Lions would close out the first half with kicker Jason Hanson getting a 38-yard field goal.

In the third quarter, Detroit continued to hack away at Green Bay's lead with Hanson nailing a 49-yard and a 53-yard field goal. The Packers responded with kicker Mason Crosby kicking a 25-yard field goal. In the fourth quarter, Detroit clawed away at the Pack's lead with QB Jon Kitna completing a 38-yard TD pass to WR Calvin Johnson. The Lions closed in as Packers punter Derrick Frost's punt was high, causing it to go through the back of his end zone, giving Detroit a safety. The Lions would take the lead on Kitna's 47-yard TD pass to C. Johnson. Fortunately, Green Bay rebounded with Crosby's 39-yard field goal, RB Brandon Jackson's 19-yard TD run, CB Charles Woodson's 41-yard interception return for a touchdown, and safety Nick Collins' 42-yard interception return for a touchdown. Aaron Rodgers was voted FedEx Air Player of the Week.

With the win, the Packers improved to 2–0.

=== Week 3 ===
Team	1	2	3	4	Total
• Cowboys	3	10	7	7	27
Packers	3	3	3	7	16

- Date: September 21
- Location: Lambeau Field, Green Bay, Wisconsin
- Game start: 8:15 p.m. EST
- Game attendance: 71,113
- Game weather: Mostly cloudy, 64 °F (18 °C)
- Referee: Mike Carey
- TV announcers (NBC): Al Michaels, John Madden, and Andrea Kremer

The Packers returned home week three for a Sunday night clash against the Dallas Cowboys.

In the first quarter, Green Bay's first possession, RB Ryan Grant fumbled the football and it was recovered by Dallas. Green Bay's defense responded by keeping Dallas out of the end zone and they had to settle for a 25-yard Nick Folk field goal. Green Bay moved the ball quite effectively the next drive, starting it off with a 26-yard completion to Greg Jennings. The drive ended when Aaron Rodgers was sacked for an 11-yard loss on 3rd down. The Packers settled for a Mason Crosby 36-yard field goal. The Cowboys next drive was fueled by a couple of long runs by RB Marion Barber. Dallas moved all the way down to Green Bay's 14, but on 3rd down Cowboy's QB Tony Romo threw a pass intended for TE Jason Witten and it was intercepted in the end zone by FS Nick Collins and returned to the Cowboy's 43-yard line.

In the second quarter, Green Bay started off the quarter with some quick and effective short throws. The Packers managed to move the ball to the Dallas 20 without running the ball once on the drive. An Aaron Rodgers incomplete pass to WR James Jones on 3rd down set up a 38-yard Mason Crosby field goal. The Cowboys managed to get one first down on the next drive, but were stopped on 3rd down the next drive after Aaron Kampman and Cullen Jenkins teamed up for the sack on Tony Romo. Dallas punted and Green Bay went three and out with a couple of minimal runs by Ryan Grant and an incomplete pass to Greg Jennings forcing the Packers to punt. The Cowboys closed out the half with a RB Felix Jones 60-yard touchdown and a 39-yard Nick Folk field goal. The Packers were down 13–6 at the half.

In the third quarter, Dallas received the ball first but were forced to punt 6 plays later. Green Bay's first drive of the second half started off with some solid runs by RB Brandon Jackson, but the highlight of the drive was 50-yard pass to Donald Driver on 3rd and 5 that set the Packers up with a 1st and goal at the Dallas 8. Aaron Rodgers was then sacked on 2nd and 3rd down and the Packers yet again were held to another Mason Crosby field goal. This field goal marked the 3rd time the Packers were shut down in the red zone and had to settle for a field goal in the game. On the Cowboy's next drive, Tony Romo completed a 63-yard pass to Miles Austin which set the Cowboy's up for a 2-yard Marion Barber touchdown extending their lead to 11 points going into the 4th quarter.

In the fourth quarter, Dallas extended their lead to 18 points with a 52-yard Miles Austin catch and touchdown. Later in the 4th, RB Marion Barber fumbled the ball and it was recovered by CB Will Blackmon at the Green Bay 12-yard line. With Dallas playing a prevent style defense, Rodgers completed 8 of 10 passes down to the Dallas 1-yard line. Rodgers sneaked the ball into the end zone for the touchdown bringing the Dallas lead back down to 11 points. After the touchdown the Packers attempted an onside kick which was recovered by Tramon Williams but he was flagged for illegal touching and possession was awarded to Dallas along with a 5-yard penalty from the spot of the foul. Dallas moved the ball into field goal range but Romo threw an incomplete pass to Terrell Owens on 3rd down and followed it up with another incomplete pass to Jason Witten on 4th down giving the Packers the ball back. The Packers moved the ball slightly, but the drive ended when Brandon Jackson caught a pass on 4th down and ran out of bounds before the 1st down marker. Dallas took over and ran out the clock with a Romo kneel down.

The Dallas Cowboys defeated the Packers 27–16 as they fell to 2–1.

=== Week 4 ===
Team	1	2	3	4	Total
Packers	7	0	7	7	21
• Buccaneers	0	13	7	10	30

- Date: September 28
- Location: Raymond James Stadium, Tampa, Florida
- Game start: 1:00 p.m. EST
- Game attendance: 64,122
- Game weather: Cloudy, 81 °F (27 °C)
- Referee: Terry McAulay
- TV announcers (Fox): Kenny Albert, Daryl Johnston, and Tony Siragusa

After losing to the 2007 NFC East Champion Dallas Cowboys the week before, The Packers headed down south to play the 2007 NFC South Champion Tampa Bay Buccaneers.

The Packers started the game with the ball and scored first on a 25-yard Aaron Rodgers pass to Greg Jennings and took the early 7–0 lead into the 2nd quarter.

On the Packers first drive the 2nd quarter, Rodgers pass intended for Brandon Jackson was tipped and intercepted by LB Derrick Brooks. Tampa Bay later tied the game 7–7 with a 9-yard touchdown pass from Brian Griese to TE Alex Smith. The Packers went three and out and punted, and the Buccaneers took the 10–7 lead on the next drive with a 23-yard field goal. On the next Packers drive was ended when Aaron Rodgers overthrew Donald Driver and Tampa Bay's Barrett Ruud intercepted the pass. The Buccaneers were held to another field goal and took a 13–7 lead into the half.

Tampa Bay received the ball after the half and drove down into the redzone, but a Brian Griese pass was tipped by a Packers defender and intercepted by Packers CB Tramon Williams and returned to the GB 44-yard line. The Packers went 3 and out and the Buccaneers were forced to punt on their next drive. Ryan Grant fumbled on the first play of the Packers next drive and the Buccaneers Jermaine Phillips picked up the ball and returned it for a touchdown to take a 20–7 lead. The Packers responded with a 48-yard touchdown pass to Greg Jennings to decrease the lead to 20–14 going into the 4th. Aaron Rodgers left the field in pain after throwing the touchdown pass. Nick Collins picked off Brian Griese close to the end of the 3rd quarter.

The Packers started the fourth quarter with the ball with rookie quarterback Matt Flynn under center. After going three and out, the Packers were forced to punt. 4 plays later, Charles Woodson intercepted Brian Griese and returned it for a lead changing touchdown, making the score 21–20 with 13:43 left in the 4th. After forcing the Buccaneers to punt again, Matt Flynn lead another uneventful drive and Tampa Bay responded with a field goal to take the 23–21 lead with 6:04 left in the game. After the kickoff, Aaron Rodgers replaced Matt Flynn to lead a hopeful game-winning touchdown drive, but Rodgers forced a ball into coverage and it was intercepted by Tampa Bay. On the next play, Tampa Bay RB Earnest Graham ran the ball all the way down to the 1-yard line and scored a rushing touchdown on the next play to increase their lead to 30–21. With the game out of reach, Matt Flynn replaced Aaron Rodgers again and turned over the ball on downs.

The Buccaneers defeated the Packers 30–21.

=== Week 5 ===
Team	1	2	3	4	Total
• Falcons	10	7	0	10	27
Packers	0	7	3	14	24

- Date: October 5
- Location: Lambeau Field, Green Bay, Wisconsin
- Game start: 1:00 p.m. EST
- Game attendance: 70,610
- Game weather: Sunny, 60 °F (16 °C)
- Referee: Carl Cheffers
- TV announcers (Fox): Ron Pitts, Tony Boselli, and Charissa Thompson

After losing two consecutive games, the Packers returned home to face the Atlanta Falcons.

Atlanta started off the game with the ball and their first play from scrimmage was a Matt Ryan 37-yard pass to WR Roddy White to the Packers 44-yard line. The Falcons extended the drive into the red zone but were stopped on 3rd and goal at the 1-yard line. Atlanta decided to go for it on 4th and 1 and Matt Ryan rolled out to his right and completed the pass to TE Justin Peelle for the touchdown.

After an uninspiring 3 and out by the Packers offense, Atlanta started off their second drive of the day with a 22-yard run by RB Michael Turner to the Green Bay 39-yard line. After a couple of short but drive extending plays, Atlanta scored again on a 42-yard Jason Elam field goal increasing the lead to 10–0.

The quarter was finished by another 3 and out by the Packers offense and a slight Falcon drive that ended in the early 3rd when FS Nick Collins tackled Jerious Norwood after a catch for a 2-yard loss.

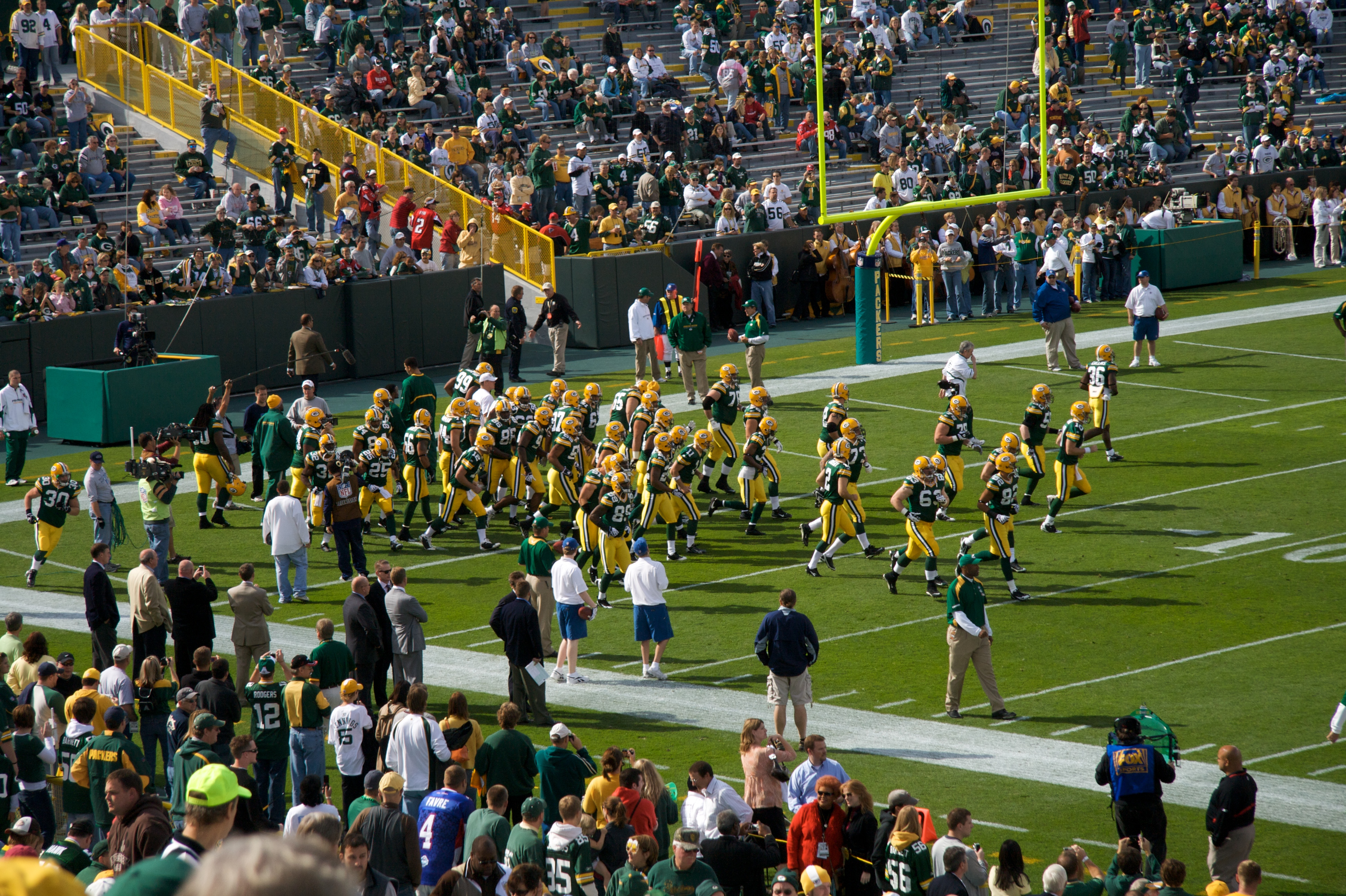
The Packers entry against Atlanta, week 5

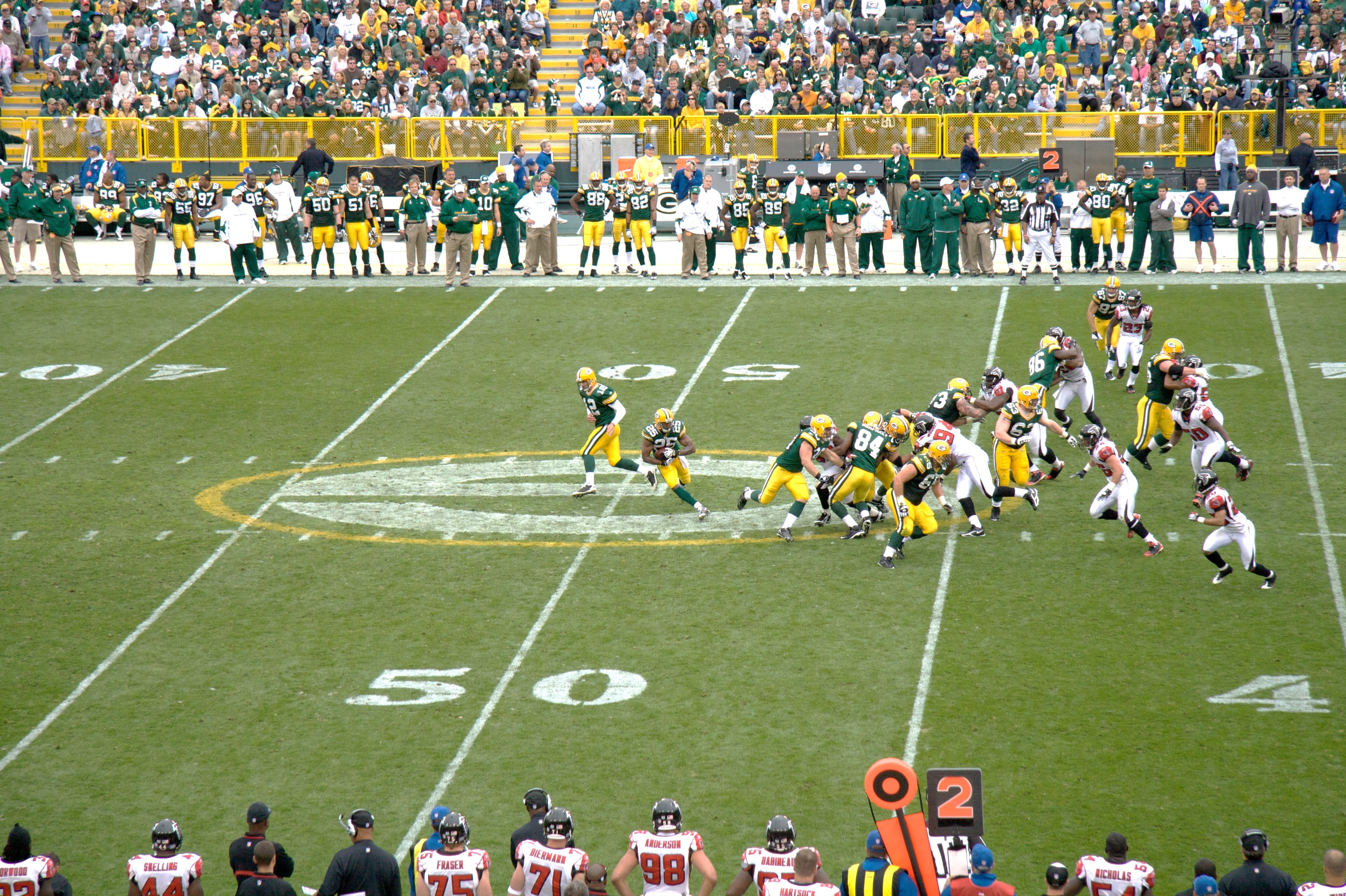
Rodgers hands off to Ryan Grant against the Atlanta Falcons

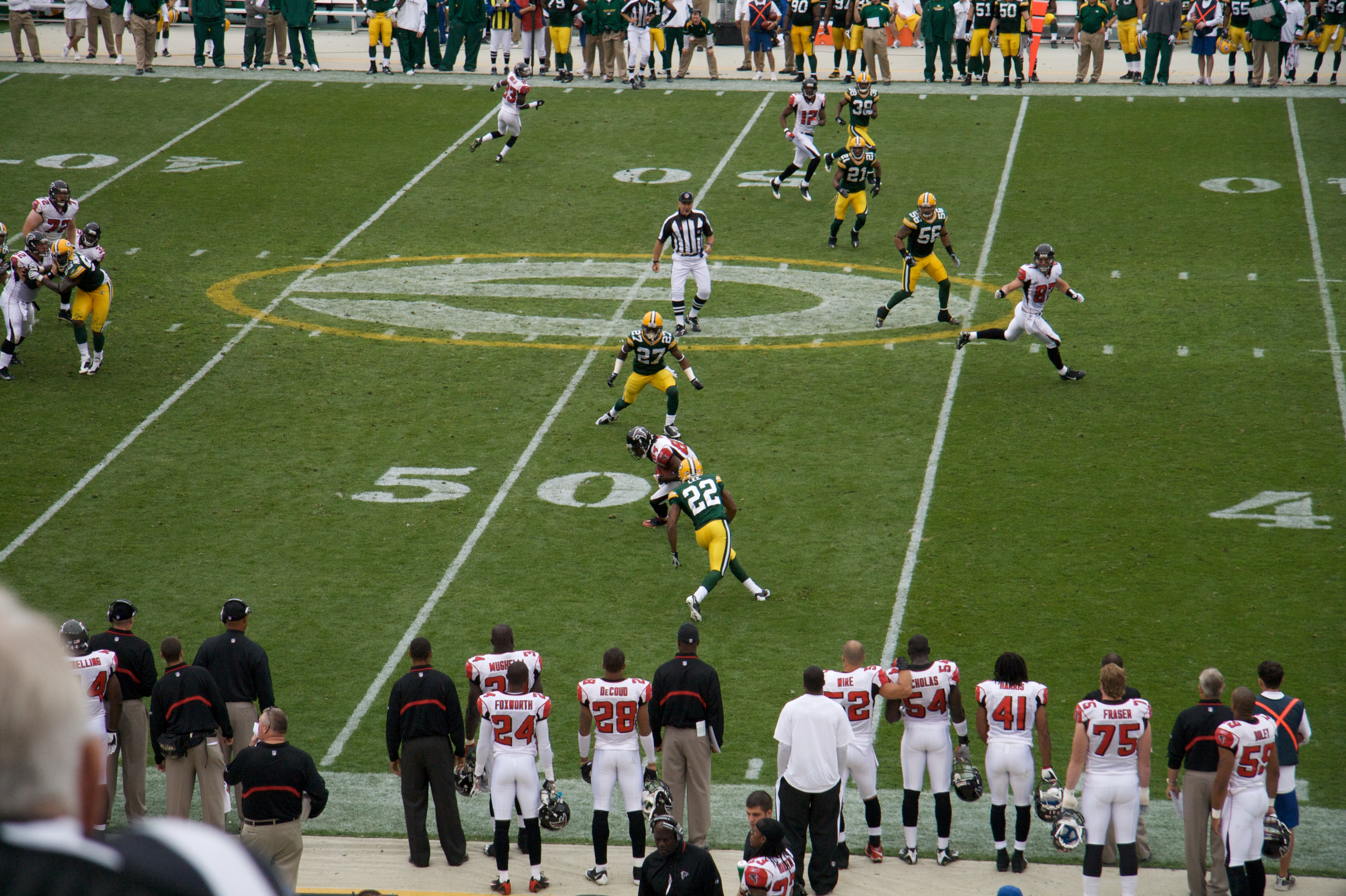
Packers CB Patrick Lee (#22) chases Atlanta's Roddy White (#84)

The Packers first scoring drive of the day would come on their first drive of the 2nd quarter. After starting out at their own 13-yard line, The Packers managed to move the ball to the Atlanta 44-yard line. On 3rd and 1, Aaron Rodgers dropped back to pass and pump faked before delivering a perfect deep pass to WR Donald Driver in the end zone despite double coverage. Driver brought secured the catch to score the Packers first points of the night making the game 10–7 Falcons.

On the next Falcons drive the Packers seemed to have stopped the Falcons but rookie CB Patrick Lee was flagged for defensive pass interference on 3rd down giving the Falcons 20 yards and a 1st down to extend their would-be touchdown drive. On 2nd and 4 on the Packers 22-yard line Matt Ryan connected yet again with WR Roddy White for another touchdown pass extending their lead to 17–7.

The Packers took over and drove to the Falcons 25-yard line and were forced to attempt a 43-yard Mason Crosby field goal with 1:20 left in the half. During the successful attempt, rookie TE Jermichael Finley was flagged for holding, which nullified the field goal and push the Packers back 10 yards. Their second attempt of 53 yards was wide right, and the Falcons were awarded the ball. The Packers forced Atlanta to punt on the next drive, and the Packers went into the half down 17–7.

Green Bay started the 2nd half with the ball, but a holding penalty pushed them out of Atlanta territory and were forced to punt after an incomplete pass and a catch short of the first-down marker.

Atlanta moved the ball slightly, but their drive ended with a drop by WR Roddy White on 3rd down. The catch was challenged by Atlanta, but the ruling was upheld, forcing the Falcons to punt, and the ball was downed by the Falcons at the Packers 2-yard line.

Starting their own endzone. the Packers managed to get out of the hole all the way to the Atlanta 32-yard line, which set up a 50-yard successful field goal by Mason Crosby to decrease the Falcons lead to only a touchdown at 17–10.

In the early fourth, Atlanta drove down the field on their next drive and were looking to score in the redzone, but the pass into the endzone was intercepted by Packers CB Tramon Williams in the endzone for the touchback.

The ball was placed at the Packers 20-yard line and Aaron Rodgers completed a 37-yard strike on the first play of the drive to TE Tory Humphrey to Atlanta's 43-yard line. Three plays later Aaron Rodgers dropped back on 2nd and 5 and completed a 25-yard pass in the end zone to WR Greg Jennings for a game-tying touchdown.

With the momentum looking to be swinging, Atlanta responded with a kickoff return all the way to the Green Bay 48-yard line. Atlanta moved the ball slightly, but had to settle for a 41-yard Jason Elam field goal to retake a 20–17 lead.

On the next drive, Aaron Rodgers dropped back on 3rd and 19 at their own 21 and attempted to force a pass to WR Ruvell Martin. Atlanta's LB Michael Boley stepped in front of Martin and intercepted the ball and returned it to the Green Bay 19-yard line. Three plays later, RB Michael Turner scored on a 1-yard touchdown run to increase Atlanta's lead to 27–17 with a little less than 4 minutes remaining.

On the Packers' next drive, Rodgers completed two key passes. The first was a 36-yard catch and run play by WR Greg Jennings and the second was a 16-yard catch by TE Tory Humphrey to the Atlanta 7-yard line. Rodgers dropped back on 3rd and 4 and passed short middle to TE Donald Lee that was taken in for the touchdown. With less than 2 minutes left, Green Bay decreased the lead to only 3 points.

After the touchdown, Mason Crosby and the hands team attempted an onside kick but the ball took a very bad hop and was recovered easily by Atlanta's Erik Coleman. With two timeouts remaining, the Packers stopped the clock on 1st and 2nd down after short runs by Michael Turner but on 3rd down Turner slipped by the Packers defenders and slipped past the 1st down marker. Atlanta then took two kneeldowns and ran out the clock.

With their third-straight loss, the Packers fell to 2–3.

=== Week 6 ===
Team	1	2	3	4	Total
• Packers	3	7	7	10	27
Seahawks	0	10	0	7	17

- Date: October 12
- Location: Qwest Field, Seattle, Washington
- Game start: 4:15 p.m. EST
- Game attendance: 68,302
- Game weather: Sunny, 56 °F (13 °C)
- Referee: Jeff Triplette
- TV announcers (Fox): Chris Rose, J.C. Pearson, and Nischelle Turner

After losing three consecutive games, the Packers traveled to Seattle to face the 2007 NFC West Division Champion Seattle Seahawks.

The game started with Seattle in possession of the football but the Packers quickly stopped them 3 and out. On the Packers first drive of the game they seemed to move the ball quite effectively and highlighted the drive with a 17-yard run by struggling RB Ryan Grant. However, on 3rd and 9 Ryan Grant was tackled for a 3-yard loss and the Packers were forced to punt. The Seahawks second drive of the game was another 3 and out and were again forced to punt. The Packers next drive was highlighted by a 7-yard pass to WR Donald Driver on 2nd and 6 as well as a nice 14-yard catch by rookie WR Jordy Nelson on 1st and 15. On 3rd and 10 on Seattle's 20-yard line Aaron Rodgers completed a 9-yard pass to Jordy Nelson which was marked a-yard short of the 1st down marker. Green Bay settled for the 29-yard Mason Crosby field goal to take a 3–0 lead. Seattle's next drive started off with the pocket collapsing on Seattle's 3rd string QB Charlie Frye and Charles Woodson sneaking in from his CB position for the sack. On the next play, Seahawks WR Koren Robinson who was released by the Packers during the offseason beat CB Tramon Williams for a 19-yard gain.

The Seahawks drive continued into the second quarter where they had to settle for a 50-yard field goal to tie the game up at 3–3. On the Packers first drive of the 2nd and third drive of the game, Ryan Grant carried the ball twice on 1st and 2nd downs for 2 and 5 yards respectively but the Packers lost possession of the ball when Aaron Rodgers stepped up into the pocket and was sacked by Julian Peterson forcing a fumble. The ball was recovered by Seattle's Rocky Bernard for no gain at the Packers 32-yard line. With the Seahawks re-gaining possession with a short field, The Packers looked to stop the Seahawks on 3rd and 1 for no gain, but the Seahawks decided to go for it on 4th down on which they gained 9 yards rushing for the first down. The first touchdown in the game was scored when QB Charlie Frye rolled out to the right and passed short to the rookie TE John Carlson for a touchdown. The Seahawks touchdown gave the Seahawks the 10–3 lead. With 8:17 remaining in the contest, the Packers next drive was highlighted by a 19-yard reception by WR Donald Driver on 3rd and 7 to the Seattle 44-yard line. After a short pass to TE Donald Lee and two 3 and 6-yard gains for a first down by RB Ryan Grant for another 1st down. Rodgers then completed a 7-yard pass to WR Donald Driver on second down paired with a face mask penalty by Jordan Babineaux which moved the ball half the distance to the goal to the Seattle 12. After a 5-yard false start penalty and a run by Ryan Grant for no gain, Rodgers rushed to the Seattle 11 for a gain of 6. On Third and 9 Rodgers passed to WR Greg Jennings for his first and only catch of the half for 9 yards and a first down. On first and goal from the 2, Ryan Grant rushed the ball up the middle for a gain of a yard. The offense then came out in a 4 wide receiver set with only QB Aaron Rodgers in the backfield. Rodgers took the snap and rushed forward through the pile toward the goal line. The initial call on the field was no touchdown but after a review from the booth it was clear that Rodgers forward progress was not stopped and his knees did not contact the ground before the ball crossed the goal line. The play was ruled a touchdown which tied the game at 10–10 going into the half.

Green Bay received the ball after the half but couldn't get the ball moving and had to punt after going 3 and out. On the second play of the Seahawks first drive of the half, RB Julius Jones broke through the middle of the offensive line for a 51-yard gain but the play was called back after a holding penalty on former Packer offensive lineman Mike Wahle. The Seahawks couldn't move the ball and were forced to punt. The Packers next drive was highlighted by an 8-yard pass to WR Greg Jennings on 3rd and 6. The drive came to a halt when Rodgers completed a pass to Donald Driver on 3rd and 11 for 8 yards. Seattle responded unsuccessfully with and incomplete pass, a completion for no gain and a second incomplete pass which forced them to punt. The biggest play of the game took place on the Packers next possession. On 3rd and 6 at the Seattle 45, Rodgers dropped back to pass while WR Greg Jennings sprinted past CB Marcus Trufant on the right side of the field. Rodgers through deep down field to Jennings who hauled the pass in at the 5-yard line and fell into the endzone for the lead taking touchdown. The Packers were now ahead 17–10 with a little less than 6 minutes left in the 3rd. Seattle took over possession but still could not move the ball. On 3rd and Charlie Frye dropped back to pass and DE Aaron Kampman sacked him for an 8-yard loss. The Packers next drive started at the Green Bay 16. on 3rd and 6 at the 20, Rodgers passed to Greg Jennings for 8 and a 1st down. Jennings caught his second pass of the drive on 2nd down to the Green Bay 42 for 14 yards. On 2nd and 8 Rodgers rolled to his right but no one was open. Rodgers pulled the ball down and ran up the sideline to the Seattle 40 for 16 yards. CB Marcus Trufant was also called for defensive holding on the play and 5 yards were tacked onto the end of the run.

The Packers drive continued into the 4th with a nice pass to Donald Driver for a gain of 8 on 3rd and 5 to the Seattle 22-yard line. Grant rushed for 7 yards on first down and 1-yard on 3rd setting up a 10-yard pass to Jordy Nelson to the Seattle 4-yard line. After a no huddle two-yard gain by Ryan Grant, Rodgers dropped back to pass on 2nd down and tossed to ball to FB John Kuhn who caught the ball on his knees for the touchdown. The Packers extended their lead to 24–10. With Seattle in a 14-point hole with 11:23 left in the game, Charlie Frye dropped back to pass on the 3rd play of the drive at Seattle's 33-yard line. Charles Woodson who was covering a wide receiver up the sideline let his receiver go and stepped in front of the crossing TE John Carlson for his 4th interception of the season. The Packers ran the ball for no gain and Rodgers was sacked on 2nd down. 3rd down was a completed to running back DeShawn Wynn for 7 yards but he couldn't reach the 1st down marker. Mason Crosby then kicked a 51-yard field goal to increase the Packers lead to 27–10 with 8:41 in the game remaining. On the next drive Charlie Frye trying to lead an improbable comeback threw deep to Koren Robinson streaking down the left sideline. The ball was slightly under thrown and CB Tramon Williams intercepted the ball at the Packers 9-yard line. Tramon returned the ball to the Packers 24-yard line for 15 yards. With the Packers trying to run out the rest of the clock, Ryan Grant rushed the ball twice for −1 on 1st down and 3 yards 2nd down. Rodgers pass to Ruvell Martin was incomplete on 3rd down and the Packers punted. With 5:15 left in the game, The Seahawks managed to move the ball effectively against the Packers prevent style defense and managed to score their second touchdown of the day at 3:17 with a Charlie Frye 5-yard pass to WR Keary Colbert to narrow the Packers lead to 27–17. The Seahawks down by 10 with 3:14 left in the game attempted an onside kick which was recovered by CB Jarrett Bush at the Seattle 43-yard line. Ryan Grant secured the victory with a 5-yard gain on 3rd and 4. Ryan Grant ran the ball for a 6-yard gain on first down and Rodgers finished the game with two kneel-downs to run out the clock.

With the win, the Packers improved to 3–3.

=== Week 7 ===
Team	1	2	3	4	Total
Colts	7	0	0	7	14
• Packers	3	14	10	7	34

- Date: October 19
- Location: Lambeau Field, Green Bay, Wisconsin
- Game start: 4:15 p.m. EST
- Game attendance: 71,010
- Game weather: Mostly cloudy, 60 °F (16 °C)
- Referee: Ron Winter
- TV announcers (CBS): Jim Nantz and Phil Simms

After snapping their three-game losing streak against the Seattle Seahawks the weekend before, the Packers returned home to face their first AFC opponent of the season, the 2007 AFC South Champion Indianapolis Colts.

The game started with the Packers in possession and the Packers started off the game with a nice 14-yard run by RB Ryan Grant for a first down. On the first third down of the drive, Aaron Rodgers completed his first pass of the day to TE Donald Lee for an 11-yard gain. Colts CB Marlin Jackson was flagged for unnecessary roughness after the play and the Colts were penalized 15 yards for the Packers 49 down to the Colts 36-yard line. After a 1-yard run and an incomplete pass on 1st and second downs, Rodgers completed a 6-yard pass to TE Donald Lee on 3rd and 9 but was nullified when Colts CB Tim Jennings was flagged for defensive holding on WR Greg Jennings during the play resulting in a 5-yard penalty and a 1st down. The next play was a run by RB Ryan Grant for 4 yards. Grant fumbled the ball on the play and it looked to be recovered by the Colts, but the ball slipped past the defenders and FB Korey Hall dove onto the ball and recovered the fumble for the Packers. Grant then followed up the play with a 5-yard gain on 2nd down and a surprise hand off to FB John Kuhn on 3rd down and 1 for 3 yards secured another 1st down for the Packers at the Colts 18-yard line. The drive ended with an incomplete pass the WR Ruvell Martin on 3rd down and the Packers were forced to settle for a Mason Crosby 31-yard field goal to take the early 3–0 lead.

After the field goal, The Packers attempted to onside kick but the ball went out of bounds after 15 yards. On the retry, Mason Crosby kicked the ball out of bounds again but this time it was much farther down field. The ball was then placed at the Colts 45-yard line but an unnecessary roughness penalty moved the ball back to the Colts 30-yard line. On the Colts first drive, they seemed to be able to move the ball very well with runs by the injured starter Joseph Addai's replacement Dominic Rhodes paired with a 9-yard pass to TE Dallas Clark. After a 15-yard unnecessary roughness penalty on CB Tramon Williams on 3rd and 1 at the Colts 39, QB Peyton Manning connected with WR Reggie Wayne for a 15-yard gain on the next 3rd down to the GB 16-yard line. RB Dominic Rhodes rushed the ball four consecutive times and capped the drive with a 3-yard rush for the touchdown. The Colts took the 7–3 lead with 4:06 left in the 1st.

The Packers second drive of the game started with an Aaron Rodgers pass left to Greg Jennings for 14 yards under soft coverage. Ryan Grant continued rushing the ball better with a nice 7-yard gain on the next play to the Green Bay 41-yard line. Rodgers failed to connect on a pass deep to Greg Jennings on the next play but CB Tim Jennings was flagged for pass interference resulting in a 25-yard penalty down to the Colts 34-yard line. After a couple of short runs by Ryan Grant, Rodgers completed a 7-yard pass to Greg Jennings on 3rd and 6 for the first down. After a Colts neutral zone infraction penalty and a couple more short rush attempts by Ryan Grant, The Packers first touchdown of the game was scored on a 12-yard pass to TE Donald Lee. With a little more than 14 minutes left in the 2nd quarter, the Packers took the 10–7 lead.

The Colts continued to attempt to move the ball on their next drive with runs and short passes to the running backs and tight ends but their drive stalled near midfield when Peyton Manning completed a pass to WR Marvin Harrison a-yard short of the first down. It appeared that the Colts were going to keep their offense on the field and go for it on fourth down and 1 but Colts coach Tony Dungy thought otherwise and Peyton Manning left the field with a look of disagreement with his coaches decision.

After the punt the Packers offense started their third drive of the day at the Green Bay 11. The Packers quickly got out of the shadows of the goal post with a 24-yard pass to WR Donald Driver to the 35-yard line. After a short 3-yard gain by Ryan Grant and two 3-yard receptions by Donald Driver, the Packers were faced with a 4 and 1 at their own 44-yard line much like the Colts on their previous drive. Instead of punting like the Colts did, the Packers kept their offense on the field a managed to get the first down on a nice 7-yard rush by Ryan Grant. The Packers moved the ball down to the Colts 33-yard line with a few short runs by Ryan Grant mixed with a short pass to RB Brandon Jackson for 9 yards. On 2nd a 7 Rodgers dropped back to pass and looked to throw to WR Greg Jennings but decided to dump the ball off the Brandon Jackson for the second time on the drive but he was tackled for a 1-yard loss. During the play a flag was thrown for illegal use of the hands on CB Tim Jennings who was covering Greg Jennings on the play. After a rush for no gain on 1st down at the Colts 28, Rodgers connected with WR Ruvell Martin for 17 yards to the Colts 11-yard line. The Packers scored their second touchdown of the day on the next play with an 11-yard rush by Ryan Grant. The Packers now held a 17–7 lead with 2:53 left in the half.

Now in a ten-point hole, The Colts offense took the field again but could not manage to get a first down. DT Ryan Pickett batted down the pass intended for Marvin Harrison on 3rd down and forced the Colts to punt.

With 1:54 remaining in the half the Packers started their final drive of the half on their own 33-yard line. The drive featured many short passes to RB Brandon Jackson for decent gains along with a Rodgers scramble down the middle of the field for a 9-yard gain. The Packers moved the ball down to the Colts 18-yard line and took a time out with 9 seconds left. Mason Crosby attempted a 36-yard field goal but the kick was pushed wide left. The half ended with Peyton Manning taking a knee and the Packers went in the half with a 17–7 lead.

The Colts started the second half with possession and managed to move the ball to the Packers 48-yard line, but a pass to Reggie Wayne on 3rd and 6 went through his hands and popped up into the air. FS Nick Collins who was a couple yards behind Wayne was in perfect position to intercept the ball and returned it 62 yards for the touchdown to take the commanding 24–7 lead early in the 3rd.

After the interception return the Colts offense took the field and managed to move the ball down to the Packers 28-yard line with a 29-yard pass to TE Dallas Clark. After a 1-yard rush and two incomplete passes the Colt's Adam Vinatieri attempted a 45-yard field goal but it was blocked by DT Johnny Jolly.

The Packers took over possession but failed to move the ball and was forced to punt. During the punt, Colts Tim Jennings was flagged for defensive delay of game and the Packers were awarded 5 yards and a 1st down. The Packers then managed to move the ball down to the Colts 11 with some short gains on the ground by Ryan Grant. The highlight of the drive took place when FB Korey Hall received a pass from Aaron Rodgers and hurdled over the oncoming defender. The drive ended when Ryan Grant couldn't get past the 1st down marker on 3rd down and they had to settle for a successful 29-yard field goal by Mason Crosby to extend the lead to 27–7.

The Colts managed to get a first down off an illegal contact penalty on 3rd down, but the drive ended with three incomplete passes by Peyton Manning. The Colts punted and the Packers ended the 3rd quarter with 2 rushes by Ryan Grant. The first play of the 4th was an incomplete pass to TE Tory Humphrey and the Packers were forced to punt for the first time of the contest.

The Colts again couldn't move the ball on their next possession and were forced to punt, The Packers took over and gain one first down on a pass to Brandon Jackson, but they failed to break into Colts territory and punted for the second time of the contest.

With time not on the Colts side, the Colts drove down all the way to the Packers 5-yard line and were looking to score. Manning forced a throw into triple coverage in the end zone to Dallas Clark earlier in the drive and it was almost intercepted by Charles Woodson but S Aaron Rouse batted the ball down before Woodson could secure the pick. Rouse made up for it though 3 plays later when he stepped in front of WR Anthony Gonzalez at the 1-yard line and intercepted the pass. Rouse returned the ball 99 yards for the Packers second interception for a touchdown in the game and 5th of the season. With the score the Packers increased their lead to 34–7 with about 4:30 remaining in the game.

In a prevent style defense, the Packers allowed the Colts offense to move down the field to the Green Bay 15. Peyton Manning threw the ball to Anthony Gonzalez at the goal line and he looked to be in for the score. The booth reviewed the catch and the call on the field was reversed. On the next play, Manning completed another pass to Dallas Clark and he dove for the pylon for the score. The booth reviewed the touchdown and again the touchdown wasn't awarded but the ball was placed at the 1-yard line. RB Dominic Rhodes rushed 1-yard for the touchdown to decrease the Packers lead to 34–14.

The Colts lined up in an onside kick formation but kicker Adam Vinatieri instead kicked the ball shallow and it was easily caught by Charles Woodson. Ryan Grant rushed for 9 yards on 1st down to put him over the 100-yard mark for the first time this season and two Aaron Rodgers kneel downs sealed the dominating victory.

With the win, the Green Bay Packers improved their record to 4–3 going into the bye week.

=== Week 9 ===
Team	1	2	3	4	OT	Total
Packers	0	10	3	3	0	16
• Titans	3	10	3	0	3	19

- Date: November 2
- Location: LP Field, Nashville, Tennessee
- Game start: 1:00 p.m. EST
- Game attendance: 69,143
- Game weather: Sunny, 69 °F (21 °C)
- Referee: Bill Leavy
- TV announcers (Fox): Kenny Albert, Daryl Johnston, and Tony Siragusa

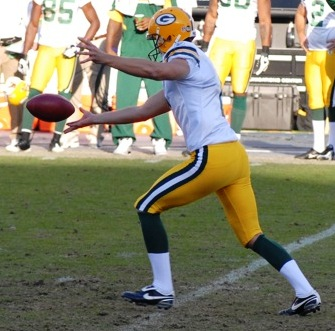
Derrick Frost punts at Tennessee, week 9

Coming off their bye week, the Packers flew to LP Field for a Week 9 interconference duel with the unbeaten Tennessee Titans. In the first quarter, Green Bay trailed early as Titans kicker Rob Bironas got a 31-yard field goal. In the second quarter, the Pack continued to trail as Bironas made a 25-yard field goal. The Packers responded with kicker Mason Crosby getting a 23-yard field goal, along with QB Aaron Rodgers completing a 5-yard TD pass to WR Donald Driver. Tennessee ended the half with RB Chris Johnson getting a 3-yard TD run.

In the third quarter, the Titans increased their lead with Bironas getting a 22-yard field goal. Green Bay would respond with Crosby getting a 25-yard field goal. In the fourth quarter, the Pack tied the game with Crosby making a 38-yard field goal. However, in overtime, Tennessee emerged the victor as Bironas nailed the game-winning 41-yard field goal.

With the loss, the Packers fell to 4–4.

=== Week 10 ===
Team	1	2	3	4	Total
Packers	7	3	14	3	27
• Vikings	7	7	7	7	28

- Date: November 9
- Location: Hubert H. Humphrey Metrodome, Minneapolis, Minnesota
- Game start: 1:00 p.m. EST
- Game attendance: 63,845
- Game weather: indoors (dome)
- Referee: Alberto Riveron
- TV announcers (Fox): Joe Buck, Troy Aikman, and Pam Oliver

Hoping to rebound from their overtime loss to the Titans, the Packers flew to the Hubert H. Humphrey Metrodome for a Week 10 NFC North rematch with the Minnesota Vikings. In the first quarter, Green Bay trailed early as Vikings QB Gus Frerotte completed a 3-yard TD pass to WR Sidney Rice. The Pack would respond with RB Ryan Grant getting a 1-yard TD run. In the second quarter, Minnesota answered with former Packer kicker Ryan Longwell getting a 54-yard field goal, along with back-to-back safeties. The first one came when QB Aaron Rodgers committed intentional grounding in his own endzone, while the second one came when Rodgers was sacked by Viking DE Jared Allen. Green Bay closed out the half with kicker Mason Crosby getting a 47-yard field goal.

In the third quarter, Minnesota increased their lead as Frerotte completed a 47-yard TD pass to RB Chester Taylor. Afterwards, the Packers took the lead as safety Nick Collins returned an interception 59 yards for a touchdown, along with CB–KR Will Blackmon returning a punt 65 yards for a touchdown. In the fourth quarter, Crosby increased the Pack's lead with a 40-yard field goal. However, the Vikings got the lead as RB Adrian Peterson got a 29-yard TD run. Green Bay tried to make a comeback, but Crosby's 52-yard field goal attempt sailed wide right.

With the loss, the Packers fell to 4–5.

=== Week 11 ===
Team	1	2	3	4	Total
Bears	0	3	0	0	3
• Packers	7	10	7	13	37

- Date: November 16
- Location: Lambeau Field, Green Bay, Wisconsin
- Game start: 1:00 p.m. EST
- Game attendance: 71,040
- Game weather: Mostly cloudy, 33 °F (1 °C)
- Referee: Walt Anderson
- TV announcers (Fox): Joe Buck, Troy Aikman, and Pam Oliver

Trying to snap a two-game losing skid, the Packers went home for a Week 11 NFC North duel with their hated rival, the Chicago Bears. In the first quarter, the Pack drew first blood as QB Aaron Rodgers completed a 3-yard TD pass to WR Greg Jennings. In the second quarter, the Bears responded with kicker Robbie Gould getting a 35-yard field goal. The Packers answered with RB Ryan Grant getting a 4-yard TD run, along with kicker Mason Crosby getting a 53-yard field goal.

In the third quarter, Green Bay continued its assault as Rodgers completed a 5-yard TD pass to TE Donald Lee. In the fourth quarter, the Pack ended its rout with Crosby making a 33-yard field goal, DE Jason Hunter returning a fumble 54 yards for a touchdown, and Crosby nailing a 45-yard field goal.

With the win, the Packers improved to 5–5.

=== Week 12 ===
Team	1	2	3	4	Total
Packers	7	14	0	8	29
• Saints	14	10	21	6	51

- Date: November 24
- Location: Louisiana Superdome, New Orleans, Louisiana
- Game start: 8:30 p.m. EST
- Game attendance: 70,668
- Game weather: indoors (dome)
- Referee: Walt Coleman
- TV announcers (ESPN): Mike Tirico, Ron Jaworski, Tony Kornheiser, Michele Tafoya, and Suzy Kolber

Coming off their dominating divisional home win over the Bears, the Packers flew to the Louisiana Superdome for a Week 12 MNF duel with the New Orleans Saints. In the first quarter, Green Bay struck first when FB John Kuhn scored on a 1-yard TD run. The Saints responded with QB Drew Brees completing a 70-yard TD pass to WR Lance Moore. The Saints then took the lead when RB Pierre Thomas scored on a 4-yard TD run. In the second quarter, the Packers responded with QB Aaron Rodgers completing a 7-yard TD pass to WR Greg Jennings to tie the score. New Orleans respond yet again when Brees hooked up with Moore for the second time on a 14-yard TD pass. The Pack struck back and tied when Rodgers scored on a 10-yard TD run. The Saints would retake the lead prior to halftime when kicker Garrett Hartley made a 30-yard field goal.

In the third quarter, New Orleans took over the game. Brees started the scoring with a completed a 16-yard TD pass to TE Billy Miller. Later, RB Deuce McAllister scored on a 3-yard TD run, and Brees finished the quarter's scoring by completing a 70-yard TD pass to WR Marques Colston. In the fourth quarter, Green Bay tried to rally as Rodgers completed a 4-yard TD pass and a 2-point conversion pass to WR Ruvell Martin. However, the Saints pulled away when Thomas scored on a 31-yard TD run (with a failed 2-point conversion).

With the loss, the Packers fell to 5–6.

=== Week 13 ===
Team	1	2	3	4	Total
• Panthers	7	14	0	14	35
Packers	0	10	11	10	31

- Date: November 30
- Location: Lambeau Field, Green Bay, Wisconsin
- Game start: 1:00 p.m. EST
- Game attendance: 70,297
- Game weather: Cloudy, 37 °F (3 °C)
- Referee: Gene Steratore
- TV announcers (Fox): Sam Rosen, Tim Ryan, and Chris Myers

Hoping to rebound from their embarrassing MNF drubbing at the hands of the Saints, the Packers went home for a Week 13 battle with the Carolina Panthers. In the first quarter, Green Bay trailed early as Panthers RB DeAngelo Williams scored on a 1-yard TD run. In the second quarter, the Packers got on the board with kicker Mason Crosby converting a 32-yard field goal, but Carolina answered with QB Jake Delhomme scoring on a 1-yard TD run. Green Bay responded with QB Aaron Rodgers completing a 6-yard TD pass to WR Donald Driver, yet the Panthers closed out the half with Williams rushing for another 1-yard TD run.

In the third quarter, the Packers tied the game with Crosby converting a 44-yard field goal, while Rodgers completed a 5-yard TD pass to TE Donald Lee (along with a successful 2-point conversion pass to WR Greg Jennings). In the fourth quarter, Green Bay took the lead as Rodgers hooked up with Jennings on 21-yard TD pass, yet Carolina replied with Williams scored on yet another 1-yard TD run. The Packers would regain the lead as Crosby nailed a 19-yard field goal, but the Panthers pulled away as Williams scored on his fourth 1-yard TD run.

With the loss, Green Bay fell to 5–7.

=== Week 14 ===
Team	1	2	3	4	Total
• Texans	7	3	3	11	24
Packers	0	7	0	14	21

- Date: December 7
- Location: Lambeau Field, Green Bay, Wisconsin
- Game start: 1:00 p.m. EST
- Game attendance: 70,245
- Game weather: Mostly cloudy, 3 °F (−16 °C)
- Referee: Peter Morelli
- TV announcers (CBS): Gus Johnson and Steve Tasker

Hoping to snap a two-game skid, the Packers stayed at home for a Week 14 interconference duel with the Houston Texans. Green Bay trailed early in the first quarter as Texans QB Matt Schaub completed a 58-yard touchdown pass to wide receiver Kevin Walter. The Packers would respond in the second quarter as QB Aaron Rodgers completed a 20-yard TD pass to TE Donald Lee, yet Houston answered by having kicker Kris Brown close out the half with a 30-yard field goal.

Green Bay's deficit increased in the third quarter as Brown gave the Texans a 41-yard field goal. In the fourth quarter, the Packers took the lead as RB Ryan Grant got a 6-yard touchdown run. However, the Texans replied with Schaub completing an 11-yard touchdown pass and a 2-point conversion pass to wide receiver Andre Johnson. Green Bay would tie the game as Rodgers completed a 9-yard touchdown pass to wide receiver Jordy Nelson, yet Houston pulled away as Brown nailed a 40-yard field goal as time ran out.

With the loss, the Packers fell to 5–8 on the season and 0–4 at home against teams from Houston.

=== Week 15 ===
Team	1	2	3	4	Total
Packers	3	10	0	3	16
• Jaguars	7	0	0	13	20

- Date: December 14
- Location: Jacksonville Municipal Stadium, Jacksonville, Florida
- Game start: 1:00 p.m. EST
- Game attendance: 65,457
- Game weather: Sunny, 67 °F (19 °C)
- Referee: Jerome Boger
- TV announcers (Fox): Ron Pitts, Tony Boselli, and Charissa Thompson

After losing three straight contests, the Packers looked to break their skid with a victory against the 4–9 Jacksonville Jaguars.

Jacksonville started the scoring on their first drive when David Garrard connected with Dennis Northcutt for a 30-yard TD pass. The Packers settled with a kicker Mason Crosby connecting on a 22-yard field goal.

In the second quarter, the Packers took the lead when Aaron Rodgers completed a 4-yard pass to Greg Jennings in the end zone for a TD. The Packers later increased their lead going into the half to 6 when Crosby converted on a 23-yard field goal.

After a scoreless third quarter, the Jaguars regained the lead when running back Maurice Jones-Drew scored a TD on a 14-yard catch and run pass from Garrard. The Packers regained the lead when Crosby converted his third field goal of the day. Jones-Drew scored his second TD of the game on a 2-yard run to take the lead back for the Jaguars. After a failed two-point conversion, the Packers took over with less than 2 minutes on the clock. Aaron Rodgers slightly overthrew TE Donald Lee and his pass was intercepted by Jaguars Safety Reggie Nelson to seal the victory for Jacksonville.

With the loss, the Packers fell to 5–9 and were officially eliminated from playoff contention.

=== Week 16 ===
Team	1	2	3	4	OT	Total
Packers	0	14	0	3	0	17
• Bears	0	3	7	7	3	20

- Date: December 22
- Location: Soldier Field, Chicago, Illinois
- Game start: 8:30 p.m. EST
- Game attendance: 62,151
- Game weather: Cloudy, 2 °F (−17 °C)
- Referee: Ron Winter
- TV announcers (ESPN): Mike Tirico, Ron Jaworski, and Tony Kornheiser

After losing now four straight contests, the Packers looked to end their losing streak against the Chicago Bears at Soldier Field on MNF.

After a scoreless 1st quarter, The Packers put the first points on the board in the 2nd quarter when Aaron Rodgers completed a 7-yard pass to Greg Jennings just inside the goal line for a touchdown. Later in the quarter, the Bears Robbie Gould successfully converted a 31-yard field goal to bring the Packers lead to 7–3. Towards the end of the half, the Packers scored again on a 17-yard screen pass from Rodgers to Ryan Grant to increase their lead to 14–3 going into the half.

In the third quarter, the Bears scored their first touchdown of the day on a 3-yard pass from Kyle Orton to Greg Olsen to decrease the Packers lead to 14–10.

In the fourth quarter, Mason Crosby made a 28-yard field goal to extend the Packers lead to 17–10, but later in the quarter the Bears tied the game on a 3-yard run for a touchdown by Matt Forte. With less than a minute left, Mason Crosby attempted a field goal to take the lead 20–17 for the Packers but the kick was blocked by the Bears.

In overtime, the Bears won the coin toss and moved the ball down inside field goal range and Bears kicker Robbie Gould converted a 38-yard field goal for the 20–17 overtime win.

With the loss, the Packers fell to 5–10.

=== Week 17 ===
Team	1	2	3	4	Total
Lions	0	7	7	7	21
• Packers	14	0	0	17	31

- Date: December 28
- Location: Lambeau Field, Green Bay, Wisconsin
- Game start: 1:00 p.m. EST
- Game attendance: 70,141
- Game weather: Sunny, 22 °F (−6 °C)
- Referee: Ed Hochuli
- TV announcers (Fox): Chris Rose, John Lynch, and Krista Voda

Scoring summary
Q1	8:49	GB	DeShawn Wynn 73 yard run (Mason Crosby kick)	GB 7–0
Q1	1:29	GB	Jermichael Finley 3 yard pass from Aaron Rodgers (Mason Crosby kick)	GB 14–0
Q2	11:17	DET	Calvin Johnson 9 yard pass from Dan Orlovsky (Jason Hanson kick)	GB 14–7
Q3	10:20	DET	Calvin Johnson 14 yard pass from Dan Orlovsky (Jason Hanson kick)	Tie 14–14
Q4	13:34	GB	Mason Crosby 36 yard field goal	GB 17–14
Q4	8:34	GB	John Kuhn 5 yard pass from Aaron Rodgers (Mason Crosby kick)	GB 24–14
Q4	7:32	DET	Kevin Smith 9 yard run (Jason Hanson kick)	GB 24–21
Q4	7:16	GB	Donald Driver 71 yard pass from Aaron Rodgers (Mason Crosby kick)	GB 31–21

After losing now five straight contests, the Packers looked to end the season with a win against the 0–15 Detroit Lions.

In the first quarter, RB DeShawn Wynn put the first points of the day on the board with a 73-yard run for a touchdown. The Packers also scored later in the quarter on a 3-yard pass from Aaron Rodgers to rookie TE Jermichael Finley for a touchdown.

In the second quarter, the Lions put their first points on the board with a 9-yard pass from Dan Orlovsky to Calvin Johnson. At the end of the half, PR Will Blackmon fair caught the Lions punt at the Packers 41-yard line with no time remaining. Mason Crosby then attempted a 69-yard free kick but the ball fell just short of the cross bar.

In the third quarter, the Lions tied the game with another touchdown pass from Dan Orlovsky to Calvin Johnson, this time for 14 yards.

In the fourth quarter, the Packers regained the lead when Mason Crosby converted a 36-yard field goal. The Packers then extended their lead to 10 points with a 5-yard touchdown pass from Rodgers to FB John Kuhn. On the Lions' next drive, they quickly responded with a touchdown score of their own by capping the drive with a 9-yard rush for a touchdown by RB Kevin Smith. On the first play of the Packers next drive, Rodgers connected with WR Donald Driver deep down the right sideline for a 71-yard touchdown pass.

With the win, the Packers finished the season with a 6–10 record. The Packers also ended the chances of the Lions winning a game in 2008, as they finished 0–16.

== Season statistical leaders ==
	Player(s)	Value	NFL Rank	NFC Rank
Passing yards	Aaron Rodgers	4,038 Yards	4th	3rd
Passing touchdowns	Aaron Rodgers	28 TDs	4th	3rd
Rushing yards	Ryan Grant	1,203 Yards	9th	6th
Rushing touchdowns	Ryan Grant & Aaron Rodgers	4 TDs	T-36th	T-17th
Receiving yards	Greg Jennings	1,292 Yards	6th	5th
Receiving touchdowns	Greg Jennings	9 TDs	8th	6th
Points	Mason Crosby	127 Points	T-7th	T-6th
Kickoff Return Yards	Will Blackmon	1,157 Yards	11th	6th
Punt return Yards	Will Blackmon	398 Yards	4th	3rd
Tackles	A. J. Hawk	86 Tackles	T-66th	T-38th
Sacks	Aaron Kampman	9.5 Sacks	13th	7th
Interceptions	Nick Collins & Charles Woodson	7 INTs	T-2nd	T-1st

== Statistical league rankings ==
- Total Offense (YPG): 8th
- Passing (YPG): 8th
- Rushing (YPG): 17th
- Points (PPG): 5th
- Total Defense (YPG): 20th
- Passing (YPG): 12th
- Rushing (YPG): 26th
- Points (PPG): 11th

== Awards and records ==
=== Awards ===
==== Weekly awards ====
- PR/KR Will Blackmon was named NFC Special Teams Player of the Week for games played on September 4–8.
- QB Aaron Rodgers was voted FedEx Air Player of the Week for games played on September 14–15.
- S Aaron Rouse was named the NFC Defensive Player of the Week for games played October 19–20.
- Head Coach Mike McCarthy was voted Motorola NFL Coach of the Week for games played October 19–20.
- Head Coach Mike McCarthy was voted Motorola NFL Coach of the Week for games played November 13–17.
- RB Ryan Grant was voted FedEx Ground Player of the Week for games played November 13–17.

==== Monthly awards ====
- CB Charles Woodson was named NFC Defensive Player of the Month for the month of September.

==== Annual awards ====
- OT Mark Tauscher was named Packers' Walter Payton Man of the Year.
- OT Mark Tauscher was voted Packers' Ed Block Courage Award winner.

=== Records ===
==== Team ====
- Tied the Packers Most touchdown, returning interceptions, game record twice with 2 @ Detroit and 2 vs Indianapolis.
- Tied the Packers Most touchdown, returning interceptions, season record with 6 (2 @ Detroit, 1 @ Tampa Bay, 2 vs Indianapolis and 1 @ Minnesota)
- Set the Packers Most touchdown, defensive, season record with 7 (2 @ Detroit, 1 @ Tampa Bay, 2 vs Indianapolis, 1 @ Minnesota and 1 vs Chicago)
- Set the Packers Most touchdowns, Defensive/Special Teams Returned, season record with 9 (1 vs Minnesota, 2 @ Detroit, 1 @ Tampa Bay, 2 vs Indianapolis, 2 @ Minnesota and 1 vs Chicago)

==== Individual ====
===== Game =====
- Will Blackmon set a new Packers' record for Most combined kick returns, game at New Orleans with 11 (3 PR, 8 KR).
- Will Blackmon tied four other Packers' record for Most kickoff returns, game at New Orleans with 8.
- Aaron Rouse tied Maurice Harvey and Tim Lewis' record for Most yards gained, interceptions, game vs Indianapolis with 99 yards.

===== Season =====
- Nick Collins tied Herb Adderley in 1965 for the Packers Most defensive touchdowns, season record with 3 (3 Int).
- Nick Collins passed Bobby Dillon for 1st place on the Packers Most yards gained, Interceptions, season list with 295 yards.
- Ryan Grant took 7th place on the Packers Most yards gained rushing, season list with 1,203 yards.
- Greg Jennings took 10th place on the Packers Most yards gained receiving, season list with 1,292 yards.
- Aaron Rodgers took 8th place on the Packers Most yards passing, season list with 4,038 yards.

===== Career =====
- Donald Driver passed James Lofton for 2nd place on the Packers Most receptions, career list.
- Donald Driver passed Sterling Sharpe for 1st place on the Packers Most consecutive games, Reception list.
- Donald Driver passed Don Hutson for 3rd place on the Packers Most yards gained, career list with 8,009 career yards.
- Donald Driver passed James Lofton and Sterling Sharpe for 1st place on the Packers Most seasons, 1,000 or more yards receiving list with 6 straight seasons.
- Donald Driver tied James Lofton and Sterling Sharpe for 1st place on the Packers Most seasons, 50 or more receptions list with 7 straight seasons.

=== 2009 Pro Bowl selections ===
The Packers 2009 Pro Bowl selections were announced on December 16 at 3pm CST on a special NFL Total Access 2009 NFL Pro Bowl Selection Show on NFL Network.

Position	Player	Team
FS	Nick Collins	Starter
CB	Al Harris ^{b}	Reserve
CB	Charles Woodson ^{a}	Starter

Notes:

^{a} : Selected but did not play. No reason was given by the player.
^{b} Replacement selection due to injury or vacancy

=== 2008 All-Pro selections ===
The following is a list of players that were named to the Associated Press 2008 All-Pro Team.

Position	Player	Team
FS	Nick Collins	Second
CB	Charles Woodson	Second

=== Packers Hall of Fame inductees ===
In 2008, the following players were inducted into the Green Bay Packers Hall of Fame.

Position	Player	Years Played
DT	Gilbert Brown	1993–99 and 2001–03
C	Frank Winters	1992-02
