= Joshua Abrams =

Joshua Abrams may refer to:

- Joshua Abrams (gridiron football) (born 1986), American football player
- Joshua Abrams (musician), American jazz bassist and composer

== See also ==
- Josh Abrahams (born 1968), Australian musician
