= Korey Hall =

American football player (born 1983)

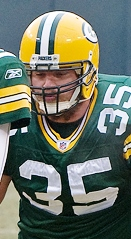
- Hall with the Green Bay Packers in 2009

No. 35
- Position: Fullback

Personal information
- Born: August 5, 1983 (age 43); Mountain Home, Idaho, U.S.
- Listed height: 6 ft 1 in (1.85 m)
- Listed weight: 230 lb (104 kg)

Career information
- High school: Glenns Ferry (ID)
- College: Boise State
- NFL draft: 2007: 6th round, 191st overall pick

Career history
- Green Bay Packers (2007–2010); New Orleans Saints (2011); Arizona Cardinals (2012)

Awards and highlights
- Super Bowl champion (XLV); WAC Defensive Player of the Year (2006)

Career NFL statistics
- Receptions: 21
- Receiving yards: 137
- Receiving touchdowns: 1
- Stats at Pro Football Reference

Korey Dean Hall (born August 5, 1983) is an American former professional football player who was a fullback in the National Football League (NFL). He was selected by the Green Bay Packers in the sixth round in the 2007 NFL draft, the 191st overall pick, and went on to win Super Bowl XLV with the team over the Pittsburgh Steelers. He played college football for the Boise State Broncos and high school football in Glenns Ferry, Idaho.

Hall was also a member of the New Orleans Saints and Arizona Cardinals.

== Early life ==
Born in Mountain Home, Idaho, Hall grew up in nearby Glenns Ferry and played high school football at Glenns Ferry High School in Idaho. He played both linebacker and running back for the Pilots and was named the Class 2A Player of the Year in 2001.

== College career ==
Hall played at Boise State University where he was a three-time 1st team All-Western Athletic Conference (WAC) linebacker and two-time WAC Special Teams player of the year and WAC Defensive player of the year. He majored in construction management while at Boise State.

== Professional career ==
=== Green Bay Packers ===
Hall was selected by the Green Bay Packers in the sixth round of the 2007 NFL draft, the 191st overall pick. The Packers moved him to fullback with the hope that he would make an impact on special teams.

Hall scored his first and only NFL touchdown on a one-yard pass from quarterback Aaron Rodgers on September 8, 2008, in a Monday night game against the Minnesota Vikings. It was Rodgers' first career touchdown as a starter in the NFL.

During Hall's fourth and final season in Green Bay, the Packers made the playoffs as a wild card team and won four straight games on the road, including Super Bowl XLV. He had one reception for two yards in the Super Bowl.

=== New Orleans Saints ===
On July 29, 2011, Hall joined the New Orleans Saints.

=== Arizona Cardinals ===
Hall signed with the Arizona Cardinals on September 25, 2012. However, three days later, he was moved to the reserve/retired list.

== Personal life ==
Since retiring from professional football, Hall has worked as a construction manager in Boise, Idaho.
