= Jake Allen (gridiron football) =

American football player (born 1985)

No. 13, 85
- Position: Wide receiver

Personal information
- Born: January 19, 1985 (age 41); Laurel, Mississippi, U.S.
- Listed height: 6 ft 4 in (1.93 m)
- Listed weight: 196 lb (89 kg)

Career information
- High school: Waynesboro (MS) Wayne County
- College: Mississippi College
- NFL draft: 2008: undrafted

Career history
- Green Bay Packers (2008–2009); Cleveland Browns (2009–2010); Calgary Stampeders (2011); Georgia Force (2012)

Awards and highlights
- 2× First-team All-SWC (2006–2007); SWC Offensive P.O.Y. (2007); First-team Division III All-American (2007)

Career AFL statistics
- Receptions: 37
- Receiving yards: 317
- Receiving touchdowns: 4
- Stats at ArenaFan.com
- Stats at Pro Football Reference

Jjathus Illimski "Jake" Allen (born January 19, 1985) is an American former professional football player who was a wide receiver in the National Football League (NFL), Canadian Football League (CFL), and Arena Football League (AFL). He was signed by the Green Bay Packers as an undrafted free agent in 2008. He played college football at Mississippi College. He also played for the Cleveland Browns.

== Professional career ==
=== Green Bay Packers ===
Allen was signed by the Green Bay Packers as an undrafted free agent in 2008. He spent the 2008 season on the team's practice squad, and was signed to a future contract at the end of the season. On October 27, 2009, Allen was signed from the practice squad to the active roster after wide receiver Brett Swain was placed on injured reserve. He was waived on November 18.

=== Cleveland Browns ===
Allen was claimed off waivers by the Cleveland Browns on November 18, 2009. He was listed as inactive for each of the remaining games of the 2009 season. At the end of training camp in 2010, Allen was released on September 3, 2010.

=== Calgary Stampeders ===
Allen was signed by the Calgary Stampeders on May 31, 2011.

=== Georgia Force ===
Allen was assigned to the Georgia Force during the 2012 season.
