= Joey Haynos =

American football player (born 1984)

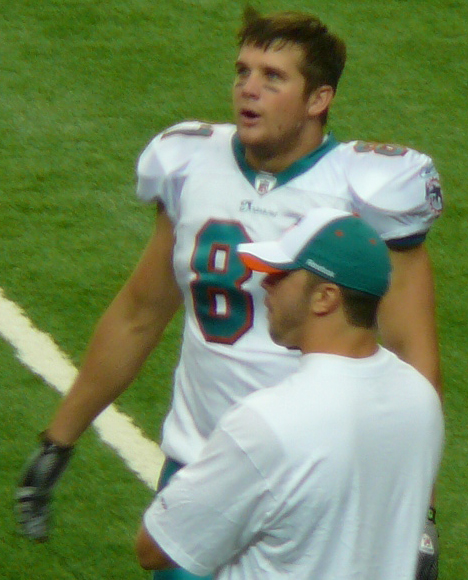
- Haynos with the Miami Dolphins in 2009

No. 81
- Position: Tight end

Personal information
- Born: August 28, 1984 (age 42); Rockville, Maryland, U.S.
- Listed height: 6 ft 8 in (2.03 m)
- Listed weight: 264 lb (120 kg)

Career information
- High school: Gonzaga College (Washington, D.C.)
- College: Maryland
- NFL draft: 2008: undrafted

Career history
- Green Bay Packers (2008)*; Miami Dolphins (2008–2010); Jacksonville Jaguars (2011)*; Tennessee Titans (2012)*
- * Offseason or practice squad member only

Career NFL statistics
- Receptions: 21
- Receiving yards: 184
- Receiving touchdowns: 3
- Stats at Pro Football Reference

Joey Haynos (born August 28, 1984) is an American former professional football player who was a tight end in the National Football League (NFL). He was signed by the Green Bay Packers as an undrafted free agent in 2008. He played college football at Maryland.

He was also a member of the Miami Dolphins, Jacksonville Jaguars, and Tennessee Titans.

== College career ==
He played college football at Maryland after playing high school football (at tight end and linebacker) and basketball at Gonzaga College High School. In two years of starting tight end play, Haynos caught over 60 catches for 690 yards. He started all games his senior year, ranking second on the team in receptions.

== Professional career ==
=== Green Bay Packers ===
Haynos was invited to and attended the 2008 NFL Combine; however, he went unselected in the NFL draft. Some had predicted the "huge player...hard worker and tough competitor... lumbering tight end" would be a late round selection while receiving comparisons to Ben Utecht. He was signed by the Green Bay Packers as an undrafted free agent on May 2, 2008. Haynos was signed to the Packers' practice squad on August 31, 2008.

=== Miami Dolphins ===
Miami signed Haynos on September 24, 2008, off the Green Bay Packers’ practice squad. Behind David Martin and Anthony Fasano at tight end, Haynos had a reserve role most of the season. His first catch of his career came in Week 15 against the San Francisco 49ers. It was a 19-yard touchdown from a pass thrown by Chad Pennington. It was his penultimate reception of a quiet rookie season. The other was a 3-yard catch in a Week 17 win against the Jets.

Haynos saw much more playing time in his second year as an NFL player. Starting eight games, he split most of the tight end production with Fasano as quarterback Chad Henne became starter in week 4. Throughout the season, he compiled 162 receiving yards on 19 catches with two touchdowns.

After making a first down catch during the third preseason game versus the Atlanta Falcons, Haynos was helped up and carried off the field onto a waiting cart. He was later diagnosed with a foot injury, and was waived/injured by the Dolphins the following Monday.

=== Jacksonville Jaguars ===
On August 21, 2011, Haynos signed with the Jacksonville Jaguars. He was waived by the team on September 2.

=== Tennessee Titans ===
The Tennessee Titans signed Haynos on August 1, 2012. He was waived by the team on August 31.

== Claim to fame ==
In the spirit of Hispanic Heritage month, officials were calling out penalties in Spanish. Joey Haynos was the first NFL athlete to have his number called in Spanish after he was penalized for a false start.
