= Pat Lee (American football) =

American football player (born 1984)

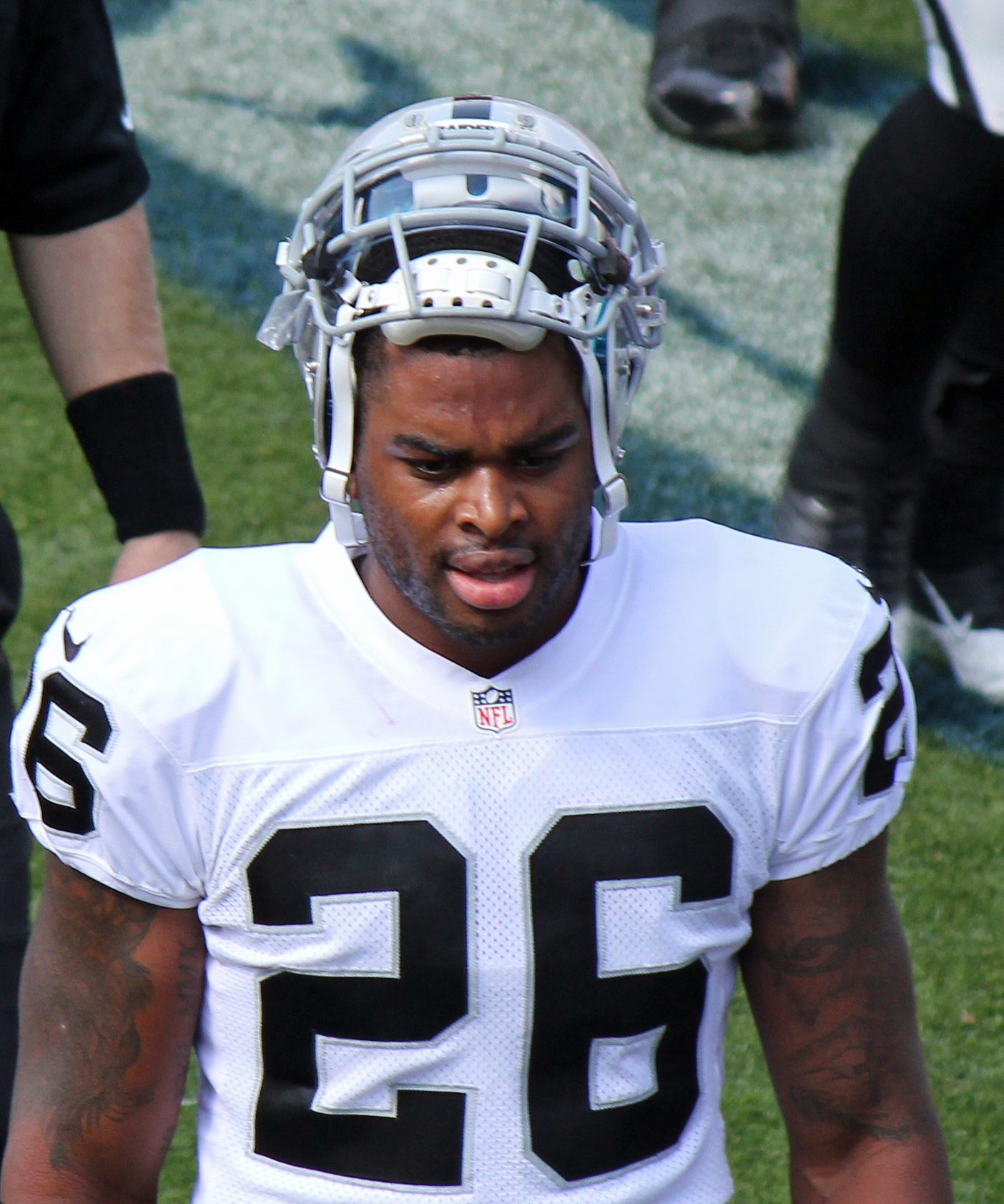
- Lee with the Oakland Raiders in 2012

No. 22, 27, 26
- Position: Cornerback

Personal information
- Born: February 20, 1984 (age 42); Miami, Florida, U.S.
- Listed height: 6 ft 0 in (1.83 m)
- Listed weight: 200 lb (91 kg)

Career information
- High school: Christopher Columbus (Miami)
- College: Auburn
- NFL draft: 2008: 2nd round, 60th overall pick

Career history
- Green Bay Packers (2008−2011); Oakland Raiders (2012); Detroit Lions (2012)

Awards and highlights
- Super Bowl champion (XLV); Second-team All-SEC (2007)

Career NFL statistics
- Total tackles: 58
- Forced fumbles: 1
- Pass deflections: 5
- Interceptions: 1
- Stats at Pro Football Reference

Patrick Christopher Lee (born February 20, 1984) is an American former professional football player who was a cornerback in the National Football League (NFL). He played college football for the Auburn Tigers and was selected by the Green Bay Packers in the second round of the 2008 NFL draft. Lee won Super Bowl XLV with the Packers over the Pittsburgh Steelers.

== Early life ==
Lee played high school football at Christopher Columbus High School in Miami, Florida, which boasts distinguished alumni such as Mike Shula and Brian Griese.

According to Scout.com he was the 29th cornerback in the nation. Lee finished his senior season with 70 tackles, seven pass breakups, three interceptions and two fumble recoveries. He returned one of the interceptions 75 yards for a touchdown and one of the fumbles seven yards for another touchdown. He was also a star on special teams, returning 14 kicks for 256 yards and one touchdown (88 yards) and blocking three kicks. Between his junior and senior season he blocked a total of 11 kicks. He got offers from Auburn, the University of Georgia, Michigan State, North Carolina State University and Rutgers. In January 2003 he committed to Auburn.

== College career ==
Lee was redshirted at Auburn in 2003. During his redshirt freshman season in 2004 he played in 12 games as a reserve cornerback. He posted 14 tackles (12 solos) including a stop for a 2-yard loss and a pass breakup.

At the beginning of his redshirt sophomore season he took over as a starter at right cornerback. After only getting seven tackles through the first five games he spent the rest of the season as a reserve. He finished with only nine tackles (7 solos) and three pass deflections.

As a junior Lee shared right cornerback duties with Jonathan Wilhite, starting four of 12 games he played in. He totaled 25 tackles (15 solos) with a stop for a loss, coming up with his first career interception. He also caused a fumble that he recovered and advanced 20 yards for a touchdown.

As a senior, Lee was selected as second team All-SEC honors. He started all year at right cornerback where he had a career-high 55 tackles (40 solos), which ranked sixth on the team. He also averaged 25.8 yards on 11 kick returns, caused a fumble, broke up 10 passes and intercepted four others.

In 48 games at Auburn, Lee started 22 contests at right cornerback. He recorded 103 tackles (74 solos) with three stops for losses of 12 yards and a quarterback pressure. He had two forced fumbles and a fumble recovery that he returned 20 yards. He deflected 20 passes and gained 52 yards on five interception returns. He also totaled 299 yards on 12 kick returns (24.9 avg).

== Professional career ==
=== Green Bay Packers ===
Lee was drafted by Green Bay Packers with the 29th pick in the second round (60th pick overall) of the 2008 NFL draft. On July 27, 2008, he signed a contract with the Packers. He was expected to be the third cornerback behind starters Charles Woodson and Al Harris.

After playing slightly in preseason behind Tramon Williams and Will Blackmon who started in place of Al Harris and Charles Woodson during preseason, Lee did not see much playing time in his rookie season. Lee was active in five contests, playing mostly special teams. During these five games, Lee recorded only 2 tackles and was credited with 1 pass defensed. Pat Lee was bothered most of the season by a lingering knee injury and was finally placed on injured reserve on December 5, 2008.

At the end of the 2010 season, Lee and the Packers appeared in Super Bowl XLV against the Pittsburgh Steelers. In the 31–25 win, he recorded one total tackle and handled two kick returns.

=== Oakland Raiders ===
On March 21, 2012, Lee signed with the Oakland Raiders.

On November 10, 2012, Lee was waived by the Oakland Raiders.

=== Detroit Lions ===
On November 12, 2012, Lee was claimed by the Detroit Lions.
