= Lorne Sam =

American gridiron football player (born 1984)

No. 22
- Position: Quarterback

Personal information
- Born: December 5, 1984 (age 41); Denver, Colorado
- Listed height: 6 ft 3 in (1.91 m)
- Listed weight: 215 lb (98 kg)

Career information
- College: Texas-El Paso
- NFL draft: 2008: undrafted

Career history
- Denver Broncos (2008)*; Green Bay Packers (2008–2009)*; Winnipeg Blue Bombers (2009)*; Coventry Jets (2010); Bricktown Brawlers (2011); Sioux Falls Storm (2011); Colorado Ice (2012)
- * Offseason or practice squad member only

Awards and highlights
- United Bowl champion (2011)

Lorne Wallace Sam (born December 5, 1984) is an American former professional football quarterback. He was signed by the Denver Broncos as an undrafted free agent in 2008. He played college football at Texas-El Paso.

Sam was also a member of the Green Bay Packers and Winnipeg Blue Bombers. He was also the starting quarterback for the Coventry Jets in the United Kingdom. He is the younger brother of NFL wide receiver P. K. Sam.

== College career ==
Sam originally played at Florida State, but transferred to University Texas-El Paso for his final two years of college. A versatile collegiate player, Sam was exclusively used as a wide receiver at Florida State, but at UTEP he played both quarterback and running back.

== Professional career ==
=== Denver Broncos ===
Sam was signed by the Denver Broncos as an undrafted free agent on April 28, 2008, but was waived four months later on August 25.

=== Green Bay Packers ===
Sam was signed to the Green Bay Packers' practice squad on December 3, 2008. He was re–signed to a future contract at the end of the season but was waived on June 23, 2009.

=== Winnipeg Blue Bombers ===
Sam signed a practice roster agreement with the Winnipeg Blue Bombers on July 13, 2009. He was released on August 21.

=== Coventry Jets ===
Sam was the starting quarterback for the 2008 National Champions, Coventry Jets. He led the team to their fourth consecutive national final, the Jets losing to the London Blitz at Sixways Stadium, Worcester. Sam had 151 completions for 2416 yards and 30 touchdowns for the Jets.
