= Thomas Gafford =

American football player (born 1983)

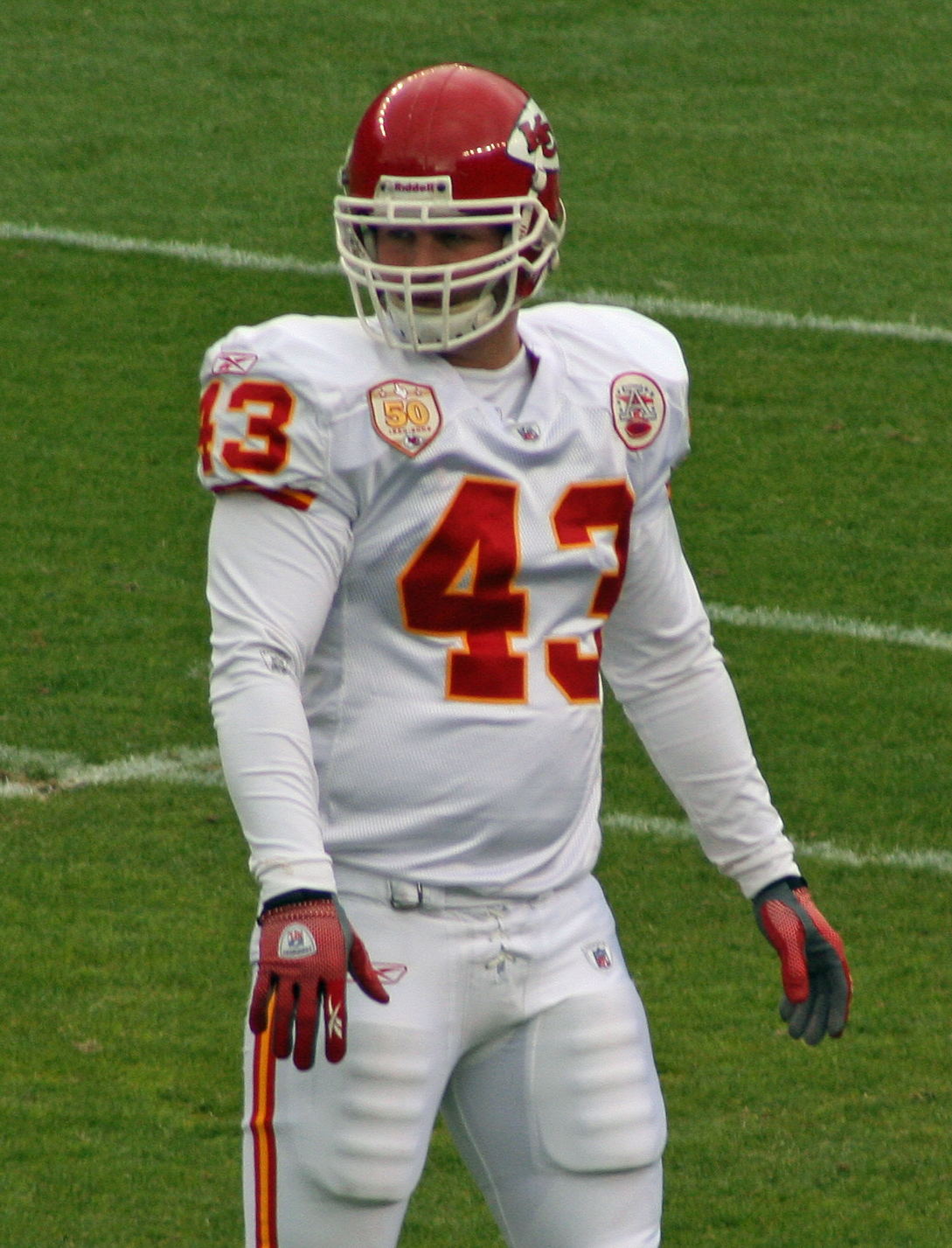
- Gafford with the Kansas City Chiefs in 2010

No. 48, 43, 47, 45
- Position: Long snapper

Personal information
- Born: January 29, 1983 (age 43); Houston, Texas, U.S.
- Listed height: 6 ft 2 in (1.88 m)
- Listed weight: 250 lb (113 kg)

Career information
- High school: Clear Brook (Friendswood, Texas)
- College: Houston
- NFL draft: 2005: undrafted

Career history
- Green Bay Packers (2006)*; Seattle Seahawks (2007)*; Green Bay Packers (2008)*; Chicago Bears (2008)*; Kansas City Chiefs (2008–2014); Chicago Bears (2015); Oakland Raiders (2015); Denver Broncos (2016); New Orleans Saints (2017)*
- * Offseason or practice squad member only

Career NFL statistics
- Games played: 125
- Total tackles: 20
- Fumble recoveries: 1
- Stats at Pro Football Reference

Thomas Edward Gafford (born January 29, 1983) is an American former professional football player who was a long snapper in the National Football League (NFL). He was signed by the Green Bay Packers as an undrafted free agent in 2006. He played college football for the Houston Cougars.

Gafford was also a member of the Seattle Seahawks, Kansas City Chiefs, Chicago Bears, Oakland Raiders, Denver Broncos, and New Orleans Saints.

== Early life ==
Gafford attended Clear Brook High School in Friendswood, Texas, and was president of the Fellowship of Christian Athletes, and a letterman in football. As a senior, he was named both Most Valuable Player and Receiver of the Year for the Clear Brook High School football team.

== College career ==
Gafford was a four-year letterman at the University of Houston and played in 47 games for the Cougars football team. He is a member of the Sigma Chi Fraternity.

== Professional career ==
=== Green Bay Packers (first stint) ===
Gafford was signed by the Green Bay Packers on February 7, 2006, after going undrafted in the 2005 NFL draft and unsigned for the entire 2005 season. On August 29, 2006, he was waived by the Packers.

=== Seattle Seahawks ===
On January 17, 2007, Gafford was signed by the Seattle Seahawks. He was waived by the Seahawks on June 20, 2007.

=== Green Bay Packers (second stint) ===
Gafford was re-signed by the Packers on March 5, 2008. On August 4, 2008, he was released by the Packers.

=== Chicago Bears (first stint) ===
On August 19, 2008, Gafford was signed by the Chicago Bears. He was waived by the Bears on August 31, 2008.

=== Kansas City Chiefs ===
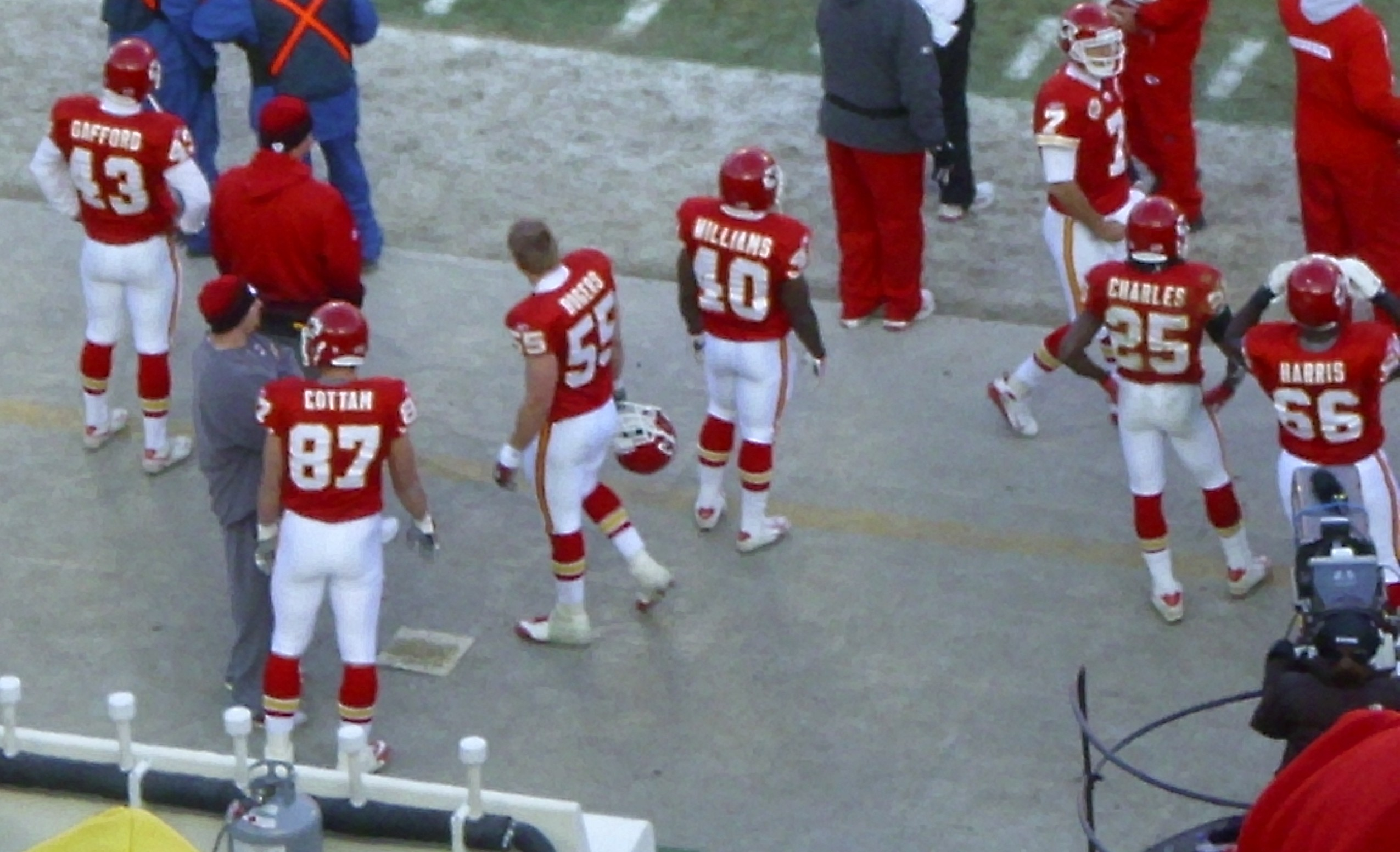
Gafford (#43-far left) on the sidelines

Gafford was signed by the Kansas City Chiefs on October 29, 2008 after long snapper J. P. Darche was placed on injured reserve. He made his professional debut on November 2 against the Tampa Bay Buccaneers and went on to serve as the long snapper during the team's final nine games.

Gafford was waived by the Chiefs on June 19, 2009. The team re-signed him on August 13 after waiving long snapper Tanner Purdum. In 2011, despite being a long snapper, Gafford recorded 3 tackles.

=== Chicago Bears (second stint) ===
On March 18, 2015, Gafford signed a one-year contract with the Bears. He was released on November 28, 2015.

=== Oakland Raiders ===
On December 15, 2015, Gafford was signed after Jon Condo sustained an injury during a win over the Denver Broncos.

=== Denver Broncos ===
On November 25, 2016, Gafford was signed by the Broncos.

=== New Orleans Saints ===
On June 16, 2017, Gafford signed with the New Orleans Saints. He was released on August 6, 2017.

== Personal life ==
Gafford is married and has two twin daughters. Gafford is a Christian.
