= Kennard Cox =

American football player (born 1985)

No. 26, 30, 35, 39
- Position: Cornerback

Personal information
- Born: August 17, 1985 (age 41); Miami, Florida, U.S.
- Listed height: 6 ft 1 in (1.85 m)
- Listed weight: 195 lb (88 kg)

Career information
- High school: Miami Killian (Kendall, Florida)
- College: Pittsburgh
- NFL draft: 2008: 7th round, 251st overall pick

Career history
- Buffalo Bills (2008)*; Green Bay Packers (2008)*; Jacksonville Jaguars (2008−2009); Seattle Seahawks (2010−2011); Kansas City Chiefs (2013)*; Seattle Seahawks (2014)*
- * Offseason or practice squad member only

Career NFL statistics
- Total tackles: 20
- Sacks: 0.5
- Fumble recoveries: 1
- Stats at Pro Football Reference

Kennard Devane Cox (born August 17, 1985) is an American former professional football player who was a cornerback in the National Football League (NFL). He played college football for the Pittsburgh Panthers and was selected by the Buffalo Bills in the seventh round of the 2008 NFL draft.

Cox was also a member of the Green Bay Packers, Jacksonville Jaguars, Seattle Seahawks, and Kansas City Chiefs.

== Professional career ==
=== Buffalo Bills ===
Following the 2008 NFL draft, Cox was signed by the Buffalo Bills as an undrafted free agent on June 2, 2008. He was released on August 26.

=== Green Bay Packers ===
Cox was signed to the Green Bay Packers' practice squad on October 27, 2008.

=== Jacksonville Jaguars ===
Cox was signed off the Packers' practice squad by the Jacksonville Jaguars on December 8, 2008.

Cox was waived on September 7, 2009, and subsequently signed to the team's practice squad. He was promoted to the active roster on September 15. He was waived again on September 28 and later re-signed to the practice squad. He was promoted to the active roster on December 5, and waived again on December 11. He was again signed back to the practice squad. He was promoted to the active roster on December 17, and waived two days later on December 19. He was re-signed to the practice squad on December 22, only to be promoted to the active roster again on January 2, 2010, after defensive tackle Atiyyah Ellison was placed on injured reserve.

=== Seattle Seahawks ===
Cox signed with the Seattle Seahawks on April 16, 2010. He was released on September 14. He was re-signed to the practice squad on September 16. He was signed to the active roster on October 12 and has appeared in each game since on special teams duty - blocking a punt on November 28, 2010, against the Kansas City Chiefs. He was released on September 3, 2011, but was re-signed on September 17.

=== Kansas City Chiefs ===
On August 14, 2013, Cox was signed by the Kansas City Chiefs.

== Personal life ==
Cox is a cousin of three fellow NFL players—cornerback Torrie Cox, cornerback Marcus Hudson and wide receiver Roscoe Parrish.
