= Condrew Allen =

American football player (born 1985)

Profile
- Position: Cornerback

Personal information
- Born: January 3, 1985 (age 41); Sacramento, California
- Listed height: 6 ft 2 in (1.88 m)
- Listed weight: 196 lb (89 kg)

Career information
- College: Portland State
- NFL draft: 2008: undrafted

Career history
- Green Bay Packers (2008)*
- * Offseason or practice squad member only

Condrew Rogét Allen (born January 3, 1985) is an American former football cornerback. He was signed by the Green Bay Packers as an undrafted free agent in 2008. He played college football at Portland State.

== Professional career ==
Allen was signed by the Green Bay Packers as an undrafted free agent in 2008. On August 4, he was placed on injured reserve with a knee injury to make room on the active roster for Brett Favre. Allen was waived by the Packers on Aug. 8 following an injury settlement.
