= Ryan Considine =

American football player (born 1984)

No. 63
- Position: Offensive tackle

Personal information
- Born: January 23, 1984 (age 42); Arlington, Texas, U.S.
- Listed height: 6 ft 4 in (1.93 m)
- Listed weight: 308 lb (140 kg)

Career information
- College: Louisiana Tech
- NFL draft: 2008: undrafted

Career history
- Green Bay Packers (2008)*; Las Vegas Locomotives (2010)*
- * Offseason or practice squad member only

Ryan Considine (born January 23, 1984) is an American former football offensive tackle. He played college football at Louisiana Tech and later was signed by the Green Bay Packers as an undrafted free agent in 2008.

Considine was also a member of the Las Vegas Locomotives.
