= Breno Giacomini =

American football player (born 1985)

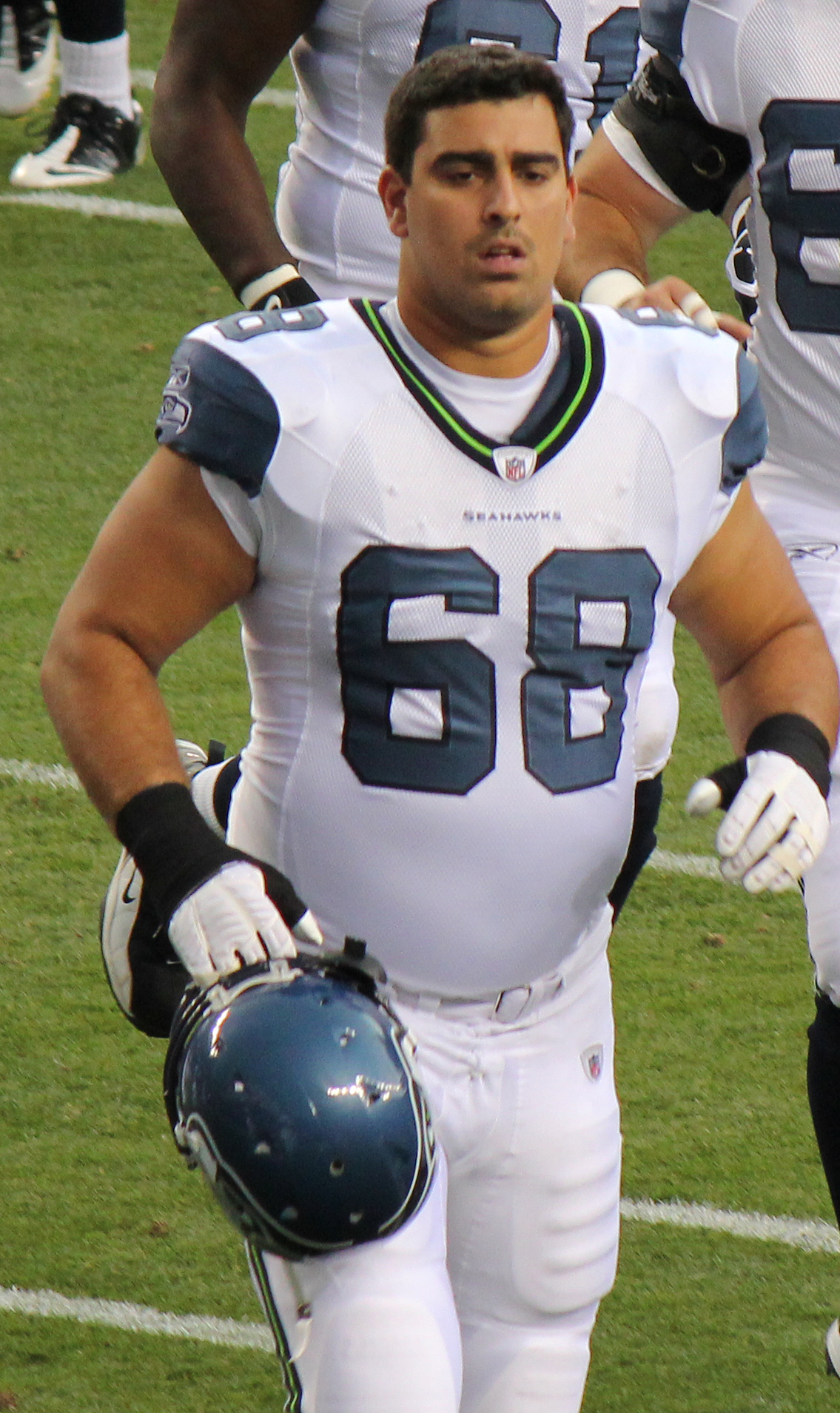
- Giacomini with the Seattle Seahawks in 2011

Profile
- Title: Offensive line coach

Personal information
- Born: September 27, 1985 (age 41); Cambridge, Massachusetts, U.S.
- Listed height: 6 ft 7 in (2.01 m)
- Listed weight: 320 lb (145 kg)

Career information
- Position: Offensive tackle (No. 68)
- High school: Malden (Malden, Massachusetts)
- College: Louisville (2004–2007)
- NFL draft: 2008: 5th round, 150th overall pick

Career history

Playing
- Green Bay Packers (2008–2010); Seattle Seahawks (2010–2013); New York Jets (2014–2016); Houston Texans (2017); Oakland Raiders (2018)*
- * Offseason or practice squad member only

Coaching
- Louisville Kings (2026) Offensive line coach

Awards and highlights
- Super Bowl champion (XLVIII); Second-team All-Big East (2007)

Career NFL statistics
- Games played: 94
- Games started: 86
- Fumble recoveries: 2
- Stats at Pro Football Reference

Breno Gomes Giacomini (born September 27, 1985) is an American former professional football player who was an offensive tackle in the National Football League (NFL). He was selected by the Green Bay Packers in the fifth round in the 2008 NFL draft. He played college football for the Louisville Cardinals. Giacomini is of Brazilian descent. Along with Gary Barnidge of the Cleveland Browns, Giacomini founded American Football Without Barriers in 2011, a football-related charity foundation.

== Early life ==
The son of two Brazilian expatriates from Governador Valadares, Giacomini was born in Cambridge, Massachusetts and raised in Malden. His interest in playing football began as Giacomini was brought to meet New England Patriots quarterback Drew Bledsoe at the Boston Marriott, where his father worked. Giacomini was a three-year starter as a defensive end and outside linebacker at Malden High School with Joe Morrisey. He started his freshman and sophomore years, but decided not to play football as a junior to concentrate on basketball, as he averaged 21.0 points per game as a senior and was second in the league in scoring. However, one of his high school football coaches convinced him to resume playing football for college. Despite taking an almost two-year-long absence from football in high school, Giacomini was rated as a 2-star recruit by 247 Sports and a 3-star recruit by Rivals coming out of high school. Giacomini ultimately committed to play for Louisville, which was the lone Division I-A college program to offer him a scholarship.

== College career ==
Giacomini played college football at Louisville. While he had played on the defensive side of the ball in high school, the Louisville coaches were so impressed with his speed and catching ability they converted him to a tight end for his freshman and sophomore seasons.

When he reported to fall camp in 2006, he had grown from a 242-pound tight end to a 303-pound offensive tackle forcing the coaching staff to move him to the offensive line. He started two games his junior year when starter George Bussey was out with an injury.

During his senior season, Giacomini moved to starting right tackle. The team's ground game struggled, but he provided solid pass protection, allowing only four sacks and two pressures on 491 pass plays. He earned second-team All-Big East Conference honors.

== Professional career ==
=== Green Bay Packers ===
Giacomini was selected by the Green Bay Packers in the fifth round, 150th overall, in the 2008 NFL draft. On July 23, he was signed to a four-year rookie contract.

=== Seattle Seahawks ===
Giacomini was acquired by the Seattle Seahawks from the Packers' practice squad on September 28, 2010, and released on October 23. He was re-signed for the 2011 season, during which he played in 15 games and started eight. He started every game of the 2012 season, including both postseason games.

Giacomini started in nine games during the 2013 season, missing seven games (Weeks 4–10) while recovering from knee surgery. Giacomini started all three post-season games for the Seahawks, including their 43–8 Super Bowl win over the Denver Broncos in Super Bowl XLVIII.

=== New York Jets ===
Giacomini was signed by the New York Jets on March 12, 2014. He started every game of the 2014 and 2015 seasons.

Giacomini started the 2016 on the Reserve/PUP list due to a back injury and missed the first seven games. He was activated to the active roster on October 29, 2016, prior to the team's Week 8 matchup against the Cleveland Browns. He was placed on injured reserve on December 13, after re-injuring his back in Week 13. Giacomini made five total starts for New York during the regular season.

On February 23, 2017, Giacomini was released by the Jets.

=== Houston Texans ===
On May 16, 2017, Giacomini signed with the Houston Texans. He appeared in and started all 17 games in the 2017 season.

=== Oakland Raiders ===
On March 22, 2018, Giacomini signed with the Oakland Raiders, reuniting him with former Seahawks offensive line coach Tom Cable. He was released by the Raiders on August 27.
