= Nevin McCaskill =

American football player (born 1983)

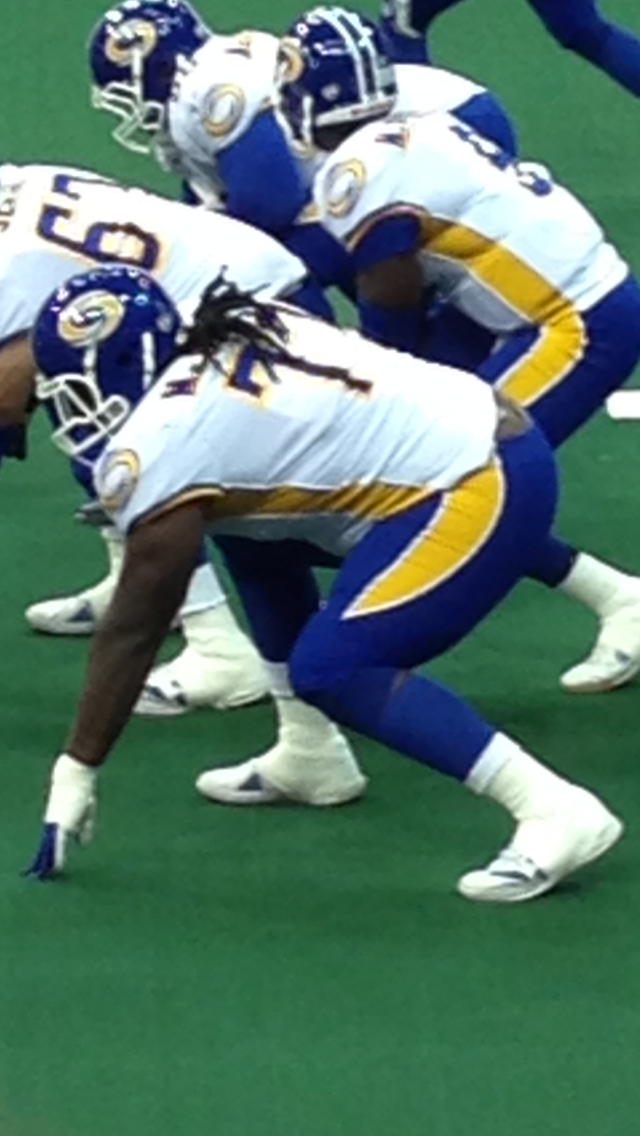
- McCaskill with the Tampa Bay Storm in 2013

No. 77
- Position: Guard

Personal information
- Born: December 29, 1983 (age 42); Tallahassee, Florida, U.S.
- Listed height: 6 ft 4 in (1.93 m)
- Listed weight: 315 lb (143 kg)

Career information
- College: Hampton
- NFL draft: 2007: undrafted

Career history
- Buffalo Bills (2007–2008)*; Philadelphia Eagles (2008)*; Green Bay Packers (2008); New York Jets (2009)*; Miami Dolphins (2009)*; Tennessee Titans (2010)*; Pittsburgh Steelers (2011)*; New York Jets (2011)*; Washington Redskins (2012)*; Tampa Bay Storm (2013)
- * Offseason or practice squad member only

Awards and highlights
- Second-team All-MEAC (2005)

Career AFL statistics
- Total tackles: 2
- Stats at ArenaFan.com
- Stats at Pro Football Reference

Nevin McCaskill (born December 29, 1983) is an American former professional football guard. He was signed by the Buffalo Bills as an undrafted free agent in 2007. He played college football at Hampton.

McCaskill was also a member of the Philadelphia Eagles, Green Bay Packers, Miami Dolphins, Tennessee Titans, Pittsburgh Steelers, New York Jets, Washington Redskins and Tampa Bay Storm.

== Early life ==
McCaskill attended and played football at Amos P. Godby High School in Tallahassee, Florida and was an All-State performer for the Cougars at offensive center.

== College career ==
McCaskill attended and played collegiate football at Hampton University and was a member of the Second-team All-MEAC in 2005 as a Junior.

McCaskill majored in Graphic Design.

== Professional career ==
=== Buffalo Bills ===
McCaskill was signed as an undrafted free agent on July 29, 2007. He was then released on September 1 but was re-signed to the Bills practice squad six days later on September 6. McCaskill was released from the Bills practice squad on September 27, 2007. McCaskill was signed again by the Bills on January 3, 2008 and participated in the Bills offseason workouts and mini camp sessions before the 2008 season. McCaskill was released by the Bills as a part of their cut down to the regular season league mandated 53 man roster on August 30, 2008.

=== Philadelphia Eagles ===
The Philadelphia Eagles signed McCaskill to their practice squad on October 21, 2008.

=== Green Bay Packers ===
The Green Bay Packers signed McCaskill to their active roster from the Eagles practice squad on December 11, 2008. He was waived on June 24, 2009.

=== New York Jets ===
McCaskill signed with the New York Jets on July 6, 2009. He was later released.

=== Miami Dolphins ===
McCaskill signed to the Dolphins Practice Squad on December 10, 2009. McCaskill was released on December 15, 2009.

=== Tennessee Titans ===
McCaskill signed a future contract with the Tennessee Titans on January 13, 2010. McCaskill was released on September 4, 2010

=== Pittsburgh Steelers ===
McCaskill signed a future contract with the Pittsburgh Steelers on January 6, 2011. He was waived on August 22.

=== Second stint with Jets ===
McCaskill was claimed off waivers by the New York Jets on August 24, 2011. He was waived on September 2.

=== Washington Redskins ===
On January 3, 2012, McCaskill signed a futures contract with the Washington Redskins. He was waived on July 25, 2012.

=== Tampa Bay Storm ===
McCaskill played the 2013 season with the Tampa Bay Storm of the Arena Football League. He was reassigned by the Storm on December 6, 2013.
