= Shaun Bodiford =

American football player (born 1982)

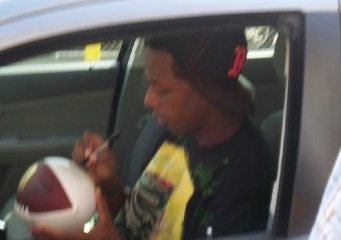

No. 19, 10
- Position: Wide receiver

Personal information
- Born: May 4, 1982 (age 44); Federal Way, Washington, U.S.
- Listed height: 5 ft 11 in (1.80 m)
- Listed weight: 185 lb (84 kg)

Career information
- College: Portland State
- NFL draft: 2006: undrafted

Career history
- Detroit Lions (2006); Green Bay Packers (2006–2007); Washington Redskins (2007); Green Bay Packers (2007); New York Giants (2009)*; Oakland Raiders (2009–2011)*
- * Offseason or practice squad member only

Awards and highlights
- First-team All-Big Sky (2005)

Career NFL statistics
- Receptions: 1
- Receiving yards: 13
- Return yards: 147
- Stats at Pro Football Reference

Shaun Bodiford (born May 4, 1982) is an American former professional football player who was a wide receiver in the National Football League (NFL). He was signed by the Detroit Lions as an undrafted free agent in 2006. He played college football for the Portland State Vikings.

Bodiford was also a member of the Green Bay Packers, Washington Redskins, New York Giants and Oakland Raiders.

== Before NFL and College ==
Before Shaun Bodiford's career in the NFL or his college career, Shaun attended Federal Way High School.
