= Kyle Ward (American football) =

American football player and coach (born 1984)

SMU Mustangs
- Title: Cornerbacks coach

Personal information
- Born: December 15, 1984 (age 41); Dallas, Texas, U.S.
- Listed height: 6 ft 1 in (1.85 m)
- Listed weight: 197 lb (89 kg)

Career information
- High school: J. F. Kimball Dallas (TX)
- College: Louisiana-Lafayette (2004–2007)
- NFL draft: 2008: undrafted

Career history

Playing
- Green Bay Packers (2008)*; Mahoning Valley Thunder (2009); Buffalo Bills (2009)*
- * Offseason or practice squad member only

Coaching
- Lincoln H.S. (TX) (2009–2010) Defensive backs coach; West Mesquite H.S. (TX) (2011–2012) Defensive coordinator & defensive backs coach; Texas A&M (2013) Graduate assistant; Boise State (2014) Graduate assistant; South Oak Cliff H.S. (TX) (2015–2025) Defensive coordinator; SMU (2026–present) Cornerbacks coach

Kyle Stephen Ward (born December 15, 1984) is an American former football cornerback. He was signed by the Green Bay Packers as an undrafted free agent in 2008. He played college football at Louisiana-Lafayette. In addition, Ward was a member of the Buffalo Bills.
