= Brett Swain (gridiron football) =

American football player (born 1985)

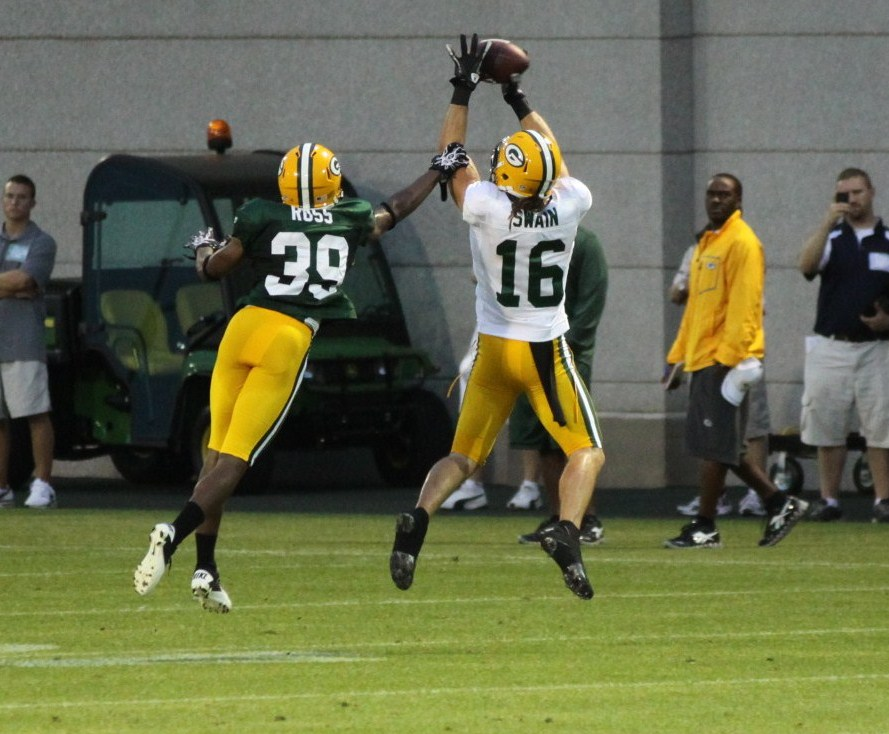
- Swain with the Green Bay Packers in 2011

No. 16, 18
- Position: Wide receiver

Personal information
- Born: June 21, 1985 (age 41); Asheville, North Carolina, U.S.
- Listed height: 6 ft 1 in (1.85 m)
- Listed weight: 200 lb (91 kg)

Career information
- High school: Carlsbad (Carlsbad, California)
- College: San Diego State
- NFL draft: 2008: 7th round, 217th overall pick

Career history
- Green Bay Packers (2008−2010); San Francisco 49ers (2011); Seattle Seahawks (2013)*; Saskatchewan Roughriders (2014)
- * Offseason or practice squad member only

Awards and highlights
- Super Bowl champion (XLV); Second-team All-MW (2007)

Career NFL statistics
- Receptions: 8
- Receiving yards: 87
- Stats at Pro Football Reference

Brett Andrew Swain (born June 21, 1985) is an American former professional football player who was a wide receiver in the National Football League (NFL) and Canadian Football League (CFL). He was selected by the Green Bay Packers in the seventh round of the 2008 NFL draft. He won Super Bowl XLV with the Packers. He played college football for the San Diego State Aztecs. He also played for the San Francisco 49ers of the NFL and the Saskatchewan Roughriders of the CFL.

== Early life ==
Swain graduated from Carlsbad High School in Carlsbad, California. He graduated in 2003.

== College career ==
Swain played four seasons at San Diego State. As a senior in 2007, he led his team by recording 58 receptions for 973 yards and 5 touchdowns. In 2006, he started a season for the first time and recorded 47 catches for 528 yards and scored twice. He also had 7 carries for 35 yards, though did not record a touchdown. He was an All-Mountain West Conference wide receiver his senior year.

== Professional career ==
=== Green Bay Packers ===
Swain was selected by the Packers in the seventh round of the 2008 NFL draft. On July 23 it was announced that the Packers signed him to a contract. He was later cut then signed to the team's practice squad. He was re-signed to a future contract following the end of the season. He played in Super Bowl XLV in the Packers 31−25 win over the Pittsburgh Steelers.

On October 27, Swain was placed on injured reserve.

On August 28, 2011, Swain was waived by Green Bay.

=== San Francisco 49ers ===
He signed with the San Francisco 49ers on October 11, 2011. He appeared in the playoff game when they defeated the New Orleans Saints. Swain was released on August 31, 2012 and did not play in the NFL for the 2012-2013 season.

=== Seattle Seahawks ===
On April 8, 2013, Swain signed with the Seattle Seahawks. On August 26, 2013, he was cut by the Seahawks.

=== Saskatchewan Roughriders ===
On February 27, 2014, Swain signed with the Saskatchewan Roughriders of the CFL. He dressed in 17 games, starting 16, for the Roughriders during the 2014 season, catching 25 passes for 377 yards and three touchdowns. Swain was cut by the team on February 11, 2015.
