= Joshua Abrams (gridiron football) =

American gridiron football player (born 1986)

Profile
- Position: Defensive back

Personal information
- Born: January 18, 1986 (age 40); North Carolina, U.S.
- Listed height: 5 ft 11 in (1.80 m)
- Listed weight: 196 lb (89 kg)

Career information
- High school: Dunwoody HS
- College: Ohio
- NFL draft: 2008: undrafted

Career history
- Green Bay Packers (2008–2009)*; Toronto Argonauts (2010)
- * Offseason or practice squad member only

Joshua Abrams (born January 18, 1986) is an American former professional football cornerback. He was signed by the Packers as an undrafted free agent in 2008. He played college football at Ohio. After spending the 2008 season on the practice squad, he was signed to a future contract at the end of the year.

On February 2, 2010, Abrams signed with the Toronto Argonauts of the Canadian Football League, where he played in five games and recorded seven tackles. He was released by the Argonauts on June 28, 2011.
