= 2009 Green Bay Packers season =

NFL team season

- General manager: Ted Thompson
- Head coach: Mike McCarthy
- Offensive coordinator: Joe Philbin
- Defensive coordinator: Dom Capers
- Home stadium: Lambeau Field

Results
- Record: 11–5
- Division place: 2nd NFC North
- Playoffs: Lost Wild Card Playoffs (at Cardinals) 45–51 (OT)
- All-Pros: 2: CB Charles Woodson (1st team); S Nick Collins (2nd team)
- Pro Bowlers: 4: QB Aaron Rodgers; OLB Clay Matthews; CB Charles Woodson; FS Nick Collins

Uniform

The 2009 Green Bay Packers season was the team's 91st season overall and their 89th in the National Football League (NFL). The Packers finished with an 11–5 record but lost in the wild card round of the playoffs to the Arizona Cardinals by a score of 51–45. They scored a then franchise record 461 points (currently the fourth best behind the 2011, 2014, and 2020 teams) besting the 1996 Super Bowl team's 456. Charles Woodson was named Defensive Player of the Year for the season, leading the league with 9 interceptions. The defense ranked 1st in the league against the run.

== Offseason ==
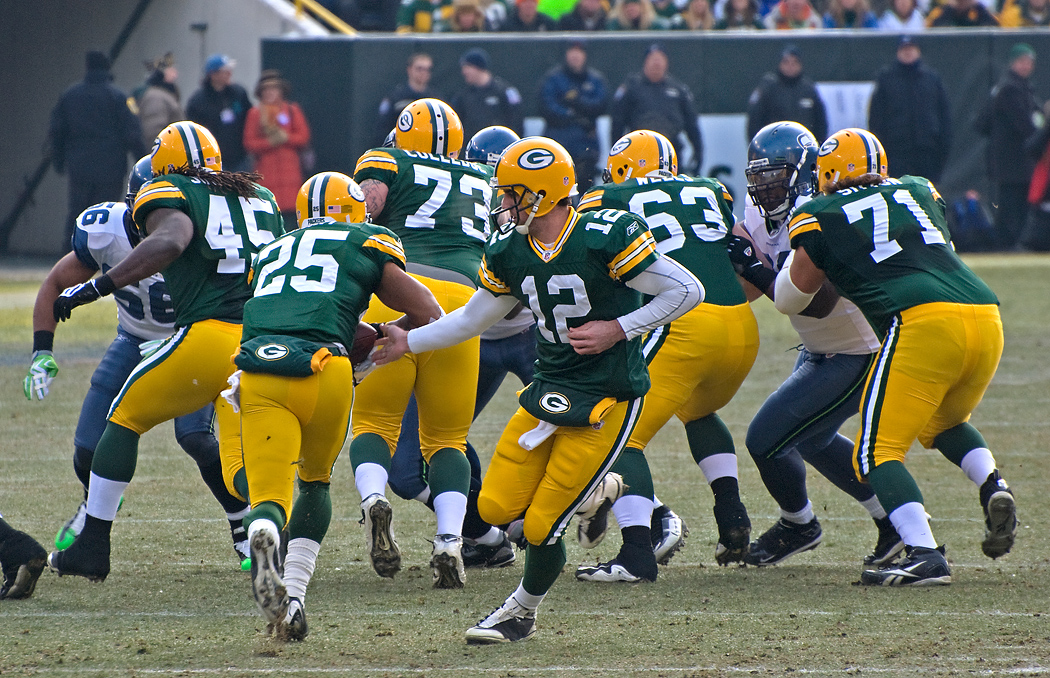
Aaron Rodgers handing the ball off to Ryan Grant in their December 27, 2009 game.

=== Additions ===
- On March 9, former Pittsburgh Steelers safety Anthony Smith was signed to a two-year contract.
- On March 30, former Buffalo Bills center Duke Preston was signed to a two-year contract.
- On April 14, former New York Giants practice squad nose tackle Brian Soi was signed to a contract.
- On June 16, tight end Devin Frischknecht was signed to a contract.
- On August 13, linebacker Stryker Sulak was signed to a contract
- On September 5, safety Derrick Martin was received from the Baltimore Ravens in a trade for Tony Moll.
- On September 6, wide receiver Jake Allen, quarterback Brian Brohm, cornerback Trevor Ford, linebacker Cyril Obiozor, running back Kregg Lumpkin, offensive tackle Jamon Meredith, defensive end Ronald Talley and nose tackle Anthony Toribio were signed to practice squad a day after they were all cut from the active roster and cleared waivers.

=== Departures ===
- On March 1, the Seattle Seahawks signed defensive tackle Colin Cole to a contract.
- On April 6, defensive end Kenny Pettway was released.
- On April 13, long snapper J. J. Jansen was traded to the Carolina Panthers for a conditional future draft pick.
- On April 27, center Brennen Carvalho was released.
- On May 1, nose tackle Fred Bledsoe was released.
- On May 4, linebacker Jason Hunter was released.
- On June 9, punter Adam Graessle and nose tackle Brian Soi were released.
- On June 16, cornerback Joshua Abrams was released.
- On June 23, wide receiver Lorne Sam was released.
- On June 24, guard Nevin McCaskill was released.
- On July 22, tight end Carson Butler was released.
- On July 30, wide receiver Jamarko Simmons was released.
- On August 19, tight end Tory Humphrey was released.
- On August 20, wide receiver Patrick Williams was released.
- On August 25, center Duke Preston was released.
- On August 31, punter Durant Brooks, wide receiver JaRon Harris and linebacker Stryker Sulak were released.
- On September 5, wide receiver Jake Allen, quarterback Brian Brohm, cornerback Trevor Ford, guard Andrew Hartline, wide receiver Kole Heckendorf, lnside linebacker Danny Lansanah, running back Kregg Lumpkin, defensive end Alfred Malone, wide receiver Ruvell Martin, Offensive tackle Jamon Meredith, nose tackle Dean Muhtadi, outside linebacker Cyril Obiozor, cornerback Joe Porter, offensive tackle Dane Randolph, safety Anthony Smith, running back Tyrell Sutton, defensive end Ronald Talley and nose tackle Anthony Toribio were all released.
- On September 5, Tony Moll was traded to the Baltimore Ravens for safety Derrick Martin.

=== Training camp and preseason injuries ===
- On May 27, tight end Travis Dekker was placed on reserve/military reserve.
- On August 13, tight end Tory Humphrey was placed on injured reserve.
- On August 14, wide receiver Patrick Williams was placed on injured reserve.
- On August 25, tight end Devin Frischknecht was placed on injured reserve.
- On September 5, defensive end Justin Harrell, cornerback Pat Lee, tight end Evan Moore and safety Charlie Peprah were placed on injured reserve.

=== Free agents ===
Position	Player	Free agency tag	Date signed	2009 team
FB	John Kuhn	RFA	April 17	Green Bay Packers
WR	Shaun Bodiford	RFA/UFA^{a}	May 9	New York Giants
WR	Ruvell Martin	RFA	April 17	Green Bay Packers
TE	Tory Humphrey	RFA	April 6	Green Bay Packers
OT	Mark Tauscher	UFA	October 12	Green Bay Packers
DT	Colin Cole	UFA	March 1	Seattle Seahawks
OLB	Jason Hunter	RFA	March 16	Green Bay Packers^{b}
DE	Mike Montgomery	UFA	March 23	Green Bay Packers
CB	Jarrett Bush	RFA	March 16	Green Bay Packers
CB	Tramon Williams	ERFA	May 28	Green Bay Packers
SS	Atari Bigby	RFA	April 17	Green Bay Packers
RFA: Restricted free agent, UFA: Unrestricted free agent, ERFA: Exclusive rights free agent

Notes:

^{a} : Did not receive a restricted free agent qualifying offer from the Packers and became an unrestricted free agent.
^{b} : Although the Packers did choose to retain him from free agency he was later waived on May 4. He was signed by the rival Detroit Lions two days later.

=== Coaching changes ===
After a struggling 2008 season on defense and special teams, head coach Mike McCarthy decided in January to fire most of the defensive coaching staff. The coaching staff changes made during the offseason are as follows:

- On January 2, Special teams coordinator Mike Stock retired.
- On January 5, Defensive coordinator Bob Sanders, Defensive ends coach Carl Hairston defensive tackles coach Robert Nunn, secondary coach Kurt Schottenheimer, cornerbacks coach Lionel Washington and strength and conditioning coordinator Rock Gullickson were all fired.
- On January 6, Joe Whitt Jr. was promoted from defensive quality control to cornerbacks coach.
- On January 7, Offensive quality control coach Ty Knott was fired.
- On January 14, Special teams assistant Shawn Slocum was promoted to special teams coordinator.
- On January 15, Curtis Fuller was hired as special teams assistant coach.
- On January 18, Dom Capers was hired as defensive coordinator.
- On January 22, John Rushing was hired as an offensive quality control coach.
- On January 23, Mike Trgovac was hired as the defensive line coach.
- On January 26, Kevin Greene was hired as outside linebackers coach.
- On January 27, Darren Perry was hired as safeties coach.
- On January 28, Dave Redding was hired as strength and conditioning coach.
- On February 3, Scott McCurley was promoted from coaching administrator to defensive quality control. Chad Morton was hired to replace him as coaching administrator.

=== Switch from 4–3 to 3–4 defense ===
On January 18 it was announced that with the hiring of defensive coordinator Dom Capers that the Packers would switch their base defensive scheme from a 4–3 to a 3–4 scheme which implements three down linemen and four linebackers instead of four down linemen and three linebackers in the traditional 4–3. While the defense will now be based out of the 3–4, head coach Mike McCarthy stated that they will also use some four man fronts thus being more of a hybrid 3-4/4-3 defense.

In a February 3 press conference to introduce the new assistant coaches to the media, McCarthy was asked if defensive end Aaron Kampman would play outside linebacker in the new 3–4 defense. He responded: "Well, it depends on what personnel we have on the field. When we line up in the first base defense, yeah, Aaron will be an outside linebacker."

Another notable question was which position group has to make the biggest transition, he replied: "Terminology-wise, they're learning a new language ... and I think that's good for everybody. That touches every player. Technique-wise, there's definitely going to be some carryover – there always is, particularly in sub-fronts. You may look at some of our subpackages, and you may not think there's a whole lot of difference compared to what we've done in the past."

He was also asked, is change good, he replied: "Change creates excitement. ... The Green Bay Packers organization will never lack for energy. It's such a great place to work from a culture standpoint, the passion of all the people that work here. But there's definitely a ton of energy on the third floor right now. Today's exciting. We're finally all back. Everybody's here, our staff is complete. So, you can just tell by the response of the players and the people close to the football team, everybody's excited about our new direction."

=== Training camp ===
The Packers held their training camp sessions at the newly constructed Ray Nitschke Field behind the Don Hutson Center. Practices will be moved inside the Don Hutson Center during inclement weather. St. Norbert College served as the team base for all living arrangements for the 52nd consecutive season.

There were competitions for starting jobs on the offensive line due to the team looking for stability on the offensive line at center and right guard, and a replacement for longtime starter at right tackle, Mark Tauscher.

On defense, the main competition for starting jobs in the new 3–4 scheme took place at outside linebacker position opposite Aaron Kampman. Second-year pro defensive end turned linebacker Jeremy Thompson was initially placed as the starter for right outside linebacker, although rookie Clay Matthews III competed for the position as well.

On special teams, punters Jeremy Kapinos and Durant Brooks competed for the Packers punting job.

On August 8 the Packers scheduled a "Family Night" inter-squad scrimmage at 7:30 pm CST at Lambeau Field, but due to inclement weather the event was canceled.

After the canceled scrimmage, the Packers released their first depth chart of the season. In the position battles listed above, Allen Barbre was listed as the starting right tackle. At the center position, Scott Wells was listed as the starter with Jason Spitz starting at his normal right guard spot on the line. As stated above, Jeremy Thompson was listed as the starting right outside linebacker. In the highly contested battle between punters Jeremy Kapinos and Durant Brooks, Kapinos was listed as the starter.

During the morning practice on the Monday after their second preseason matchup vs the Buffalo Bills, It became apparent that Scott Wells had lost his starting center position to Jason Spitz, with Josh Sitton replacing Spitz at right guard and Allen Barbre continued to hold the starting reps at right tackle. These changes were also later reflected on the teams depth chart on Packers.com.

Another change on the depth chart was Johnny Jolly replacing rookie first round draft pick B. J. Raji and Justin Harrell at left defensive end due to Jolly's explosive performance in the first two preseason contests of the season, which included two sacks and a forced fumble vs Buffalo.

The third change of note made was Brady Poppinga regaining his starting outside linebacker spot on the depth chart ahead of Jeremy Thompson and rookie first-round pick Clay Matthews. Thompson and Matthews though still have a chance to take the starting spot.

The punting competition remained undecided after two preseason games. Brooks' position was impacted by a recurring hip flexor injury, which raised concerns regarding his durability. Kapinos demonstrated less leg strength than Brooks' but remained an option for the position. While the Packers management evaluated rosters from other teams for alternative punters, external options were limited due to a league-wide shortage of available talent at the position.

=== 2009 NFL draft ===
After finishing the 2008 season with a 6–10 record, the Packers held the 9th selection in the 2009 NFL draft. With the pick they selected nose tackle B. J. Raji of Boston College. After selecting Raji, they then traded picks 2–41, 3–73 and 3–83 to the New England Patriots for picks 1–26 and 5–162. With pick 1–26, the Packers selected outside linebacker Clay Matthews of USC. After the rest of the first day of the draft had passed in which the Packers held no selections, the Packers started the second day of the draft by selecting guard T. J. Lang of Eastern Michigan with pick 4–109. In the following round the selected FB Quinn Johnson of LSU with pick 5–145 and OT Jamon Meredith of South Carolina with pick 5–162. In the sixth round they selected DE Jarius Wynn of Georgia with pick 6–182 and CB Brandon Underwood of Cincinnati with pick 6–187. With their final pick of the draft they selected LB Brad Jones of Colorado with pick 7–218.

2009 Green Bay Packers draft
Round	Pick	Player	Position	College	Notes
1	9	B.J. Raji *	Defensive tackle	Boston College	
1	26	Clay Matthews *	Linebacker	USC	from Baltimore via New England
4	109	T.J. Lang *	Offensive tackle	Eastern Michigan	
5	145	Quinn Johnson	Fullback	LSU	
5	162	Jamon Meredith	Offensive tackle	South Carolina	from Baltimore via New England
6	182	Jarius Wynn	Defensive end	Georgia	
6	187	Brandon Underwood	Cornerback	Cincinnati	from New Orleans
7	218	Brad Jones	Linebacker	Colorado	
Made roster † Pro Football Hall of Fame * Made at least one Pro Bowl during career

==== Draft pick trades ====
- In 2008, The Packers traded their 7th round selection of the 2008 NFL draft to the New Orleans Saints for their 6th round selection (6–187) in the 2009 NFL draft.
- In 2008, The Packers traded QB Brett Favre to the New York Jets for a conditional draft pick. Favre took the required majority of the team's snaps at quarterback but the Jets failed to qualify for the playoffs so the Packers received the Jets' 3rd-round pick (3–83).
- During the 2009 NFL draft, The Packers traded picks 2–41, 3–73 and 3–83 to the New England Patriots for picks 1–26 and 5–162.

==== Undrafted free agents ====
Following the 2009 NFL draft, the Packers signed 11 undrafted free agents. They were:

- Tight end, Carson Butler (Michigan)
- Tight end, Travis Dekker (Air Force)
- Offensive tackle, Evan Dietrich-Smith (Idaho State)
- Wide receiver, JaRon Harris (South Dakota State)
- Offensive tackle, Andrew Hartline (Central Michigan)
- Wide receiver, Kole Heckendorf (North Dakota State)
- Linebacker, Cyril Obiozor (Texas A&M)
- Wide receiver, Jamarko Simmons (Western Michigan)
- Running back, Tyrell Sutton (Northwestern)
- Linebacker, Ronald Talley (Delaware)
- Wide receiver, Patrick Williams (Colorado)

On May 4, the Packers signed Cornerback Trevor Ford, Punter Adam Graessle, nose tackle Dean Muhtadi and Offensive tackle Dane Randolph (Maryland) after they attended a minicamp on a tryout basis.

== Staff ==
Green Bay Packers 2009 staff
Front office: Executive committee – Board of Directors; President/CEO – Mark Murphy; Executive vice president/general manager/director of football operations – Ted Thompson; Vice president of football administration/player finance – Russ Ball; Director of football operations – Reggie McKenzie; Director of football operations – John Schneider; Director of college scouting – John Dorsey; Assistant director of college scouting – Shaun Herock; Assistant director of pro personnel – Eliot Wolf; Assistant director of pro personnel – Tim Terry; Head coaches: Head coach – Mike McCarthy; Assistant head coach/inside linebackers – Winston Moss; Offensive coaches: Offensive coordinator – Joe Philbin; Quarterbacks – Tom Clements; Running backs – Edgar Bennett; Wide receivers – Jimmy Robinson; Tight ends – Ben McAdoo; Offensive line – James Campen; Assistant offensive line – Jerry Fontenot; Offensive quality control – John Rushing	Defensive coaches: Defensive coordinator – Dom Capers; Defensive line – Mike Trgovac; Outside linebackers – Kevin Greene; Secondary (Cornerbacks) – Joe Whitt Jr.; Secondary (Safeties) – Darren Perry; Defensive quality control – Scott McCurley; Special teams coaches: Special teams coordinator – Shawn Slocum; Assistant special teams – Curtis Fuller; Strength and conditioning: Strength and conditioning – Dave Redding; Assistant strength and conditioning – Mark Lovat; Strength and conditioning assistant – Mondray Gee

== Roster ==
2009 Green Bay Packers roster
Quarterbacks (QB): 10 Matt Flynn; 12 Aaron Rodgers; Running backs (RB): 25 Ryan Grant; 34 Ahman Green; 35 Korey Hall FB; 32 Brandon Jackson; 45 Quinn Johnson FB; 30 John Kuhn FB; Wide receivers (WR): 80 Donald Driver; 85 Greg Jennings; 89 James Jones; 87 Jordy Nelson; 18 Patrick Williams; Tight ends (TE): 88 Jermichael Finley; 41 Spencer Havner; 86 Donald Lee	Offensive linemen (OL): 78 Allen Barbre OT; 76 Chad Clifton OT; 73 Daryn Colledge G; 62 Evan Dietrich-Smith C; 68 Breno Giacomini OT; 70 T. J. Lang G; 71 Josh Sitton G; 65 Mark Tauscher OT; 63 Scott Wells C; Defensive linemen (DL): 77 Cullen Jenkins DE; 97 Johnny Jolly DE; 96 Michael Montgomery DE; 79 Ryan Pickett NT; 90 B. J. Raji NT; 93 Anthony Toribio NT; 94 Jarius Wynn DE	Linebackers (LB): 56 Nick Barnett ILB; 55 Desmond Bishop ILB; 54 Brandon Chillar ILB; 50 A. J. Hawk ILB; 59 Brad Jones OLB; 52 Clay Matthews OLB; 57 Cyril Obiozor OLB; 51 Brady Poppinga OLB; Defensive backs (DB): 26 Josh Bell CB; 20 Atari Bigby SS; 24 Jarrett Bush CB; 36 Nick Collins FS; 39 Trevor Ford CB; 47 Matt Giordano FS; 29 Derrick Martin SS; 37 Aaron Rouse SS; 33 Brandon Underwood CB; 38 Tramon Williams CB; 21 Charles Woodson CB; Special teams (ST): 2 Mason Crosby K; 61 Brett Goode LS; 7 Jeremy Kapinos P	Practice squad: 43 D. J. Clark CB; 83 Tom Crabtree TE; 67 Stanley Daniels G; 49 Robert Francois LB; 17 Khalil Jones WR; 28 Kregg Lumpkin RB; 13 Chris Pizzotti QB; 95 Ronald Talley DE; Reserve: 27 Will Blackmon CB (IR); 48 Travis Dekker TE (Military); 46 Devin Frischknecht TE (IR); 91 Justin Harrell DE (IR); 31 Al Harris CB (IR); 74 Aaron Kampman OLB (IR); 22 Pat Lee CB (IR); 72 Jason Spitz G (IR); 16 Brett Swain WR (IR); 99 Jeremy Thompson LB (IR); 42 DeShawn Wynn RB (IR); Rookies in italics 53 active, 11 reserve, 8 practice squad

== Starters ==
=== Offense ===
POS	Name	GS	Name	GS	Name	GS
QB	Aaron Rodgers	16				
RB	Ryan Grant	16				
FB	John Kuhn	12	Korey Hall	4		
WR	Donald Driver	16				
WR	Greg Jennings	16				
TE	Donald Lee	16				
LT	Chad Clifton	13	Daryn Colledge	2	T. J. Lang	1
LG	Daryn Colledge	14	Jason Spitz	2		
C	Scott Wells	14	Jason Spitz	2		
RG	Josh Sitton	16				
RT	Mark Tauscher	8	Allen Barbre	7	T. J. Lang	1

=== Defense and special teams ===
POS	Name	GS	Name	GS	Name	GS
LDE	Johnny Jolly	16				
NT	Ryan Pickett	12	B. J. Raji	4		
RDE	Cullen Jenkins	16				
LOLB	Aaron Kampman	9	Brad Jones	7		
MLB	Nick Barnett	16				
MLB	A. J. Hawk	16				
ROLB	Clay Matthews	11	Brady Poppinga	5		
RCB	Al Harris	10	Tramon Williams	6		
LCB	Charles Woodson	16				
SS	Atari Bigby	13	Derrick Martin	2	Aaron Rouse	1
FS	Nick Collins	16				
K	Mason Crosby	16				
P	Jeremy Kapinos	16				

Note: This chart depicts the amount of 1st string appearances during the season. Actual starts in the NFL are credited to any player on the field during the first offensive and defensive play regardless of formation. Italics denote rookie and first year players.

=== Regular season transactions ===
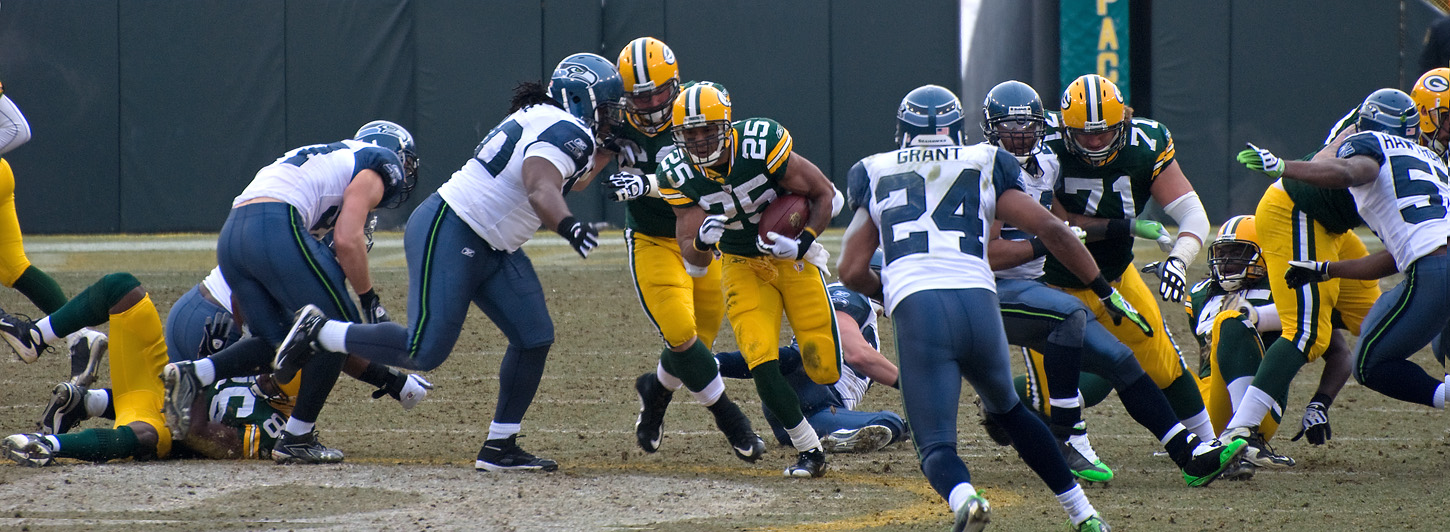
Ryan Grant running through the line for a 56-yard touchdown against Seattle.

- On September 23, The Packers released safety Aaron Rouse and signed former Indianapolis Colts safety Matt Giordano to their active roster. The Packers also signed offensive tackle Dane Randolph to their practice squad.
- On September 29, The Packers released offensive tackle Dane Randolph from their practice squad and signed offensive guard Stanley Daniels.
- On October 12, The Packers signed offensive tackle Mark Tauscher and put cornerback/return specialist Will Blackmon on injured reserve.
- On October 21, The Packers signed running back Ahman Green and put running back DeShawn Wynn on injured reserve.
- On October 27, The Packers signed wide receiver Jake Allen from their practice squad to their active roster wide receiver and placed wide receiver Brett Swain on Injured Reserve. They also signed wide receivers Biren Ealy and Patrick Williams to their practice squad and released guard Stanley Daniels from the practice squad.
- On November 7, guard Jason Spitz was placed on injured reserve and wide receiver Biren Ealy was signed to the active roster from the practice squad.
- On November 11, previously released guard Stanley Daniels was signed to the practice squad.
- On November 18, Wide receiver Jake Allen was released.
- On November 19, the Packers declined to match the Buffalo Bills offer for practice squad quarterback Brian Brohm and he was signed to the Bills active roster. Quarterback Mike Reilly was then signed to the Packers practice squad as a replacement.
- On November 24, the Packers signed cornerback Josh Bell to their active roster.
- On November 25, the Packers signed cornerback Trevor Ford to their active roster and placed cornerback Al Harris on injured reserve.
- On December 1, the Packers signed tight end Tom Crabtree to their practice squad.
- On December 7, the Packers signed linebacker Cyril Obiozor to the active roster from the practice squad and placed outside linebacker Aaron Kampman on injured reserve.
- On December 9, the Packers signed linebacker Robert Francois and quarterback Chris Pizzotti to their practice squad.
- On December 15, the Packers signed wide receiver Patrick Williams from their practice squad to their active roster and released wide receiver Biren Ealy.
- On December 16, cornerback D. J. Clark was signed to their practice squad.
- On December 30, nose tackle Anthony Toribio was signed from the practice squad to the active roster and linebacker Jeremy Thompson was placed on injured reserve. Wide receiver Khalil Jones was also signed to their practice squad.

== Schedule ==
=== Preseason ===
Week	Date	Opponent	Result	Record	Game site	NFL.com recap
1	August 15	Cleveland Browns	W 17–0	1–0	Lambeau Field	Recap
2	August 22	Buffalo Bills	W 31–21	2–0	Lambeau Field	Recap
3	August 28	at Arizona Cardinals	W 44–37	3–0	University of Phoenix Stadium	Recap
4	September 3	at Tennessee Titans	L 13–27	3–1	LP Field	Recap

=== Regular season ===
Week	Date	Opponent	Result	Record	Game site	NFL.com recap
1	September 13	Chicago Bears	W 21–15	1–0	Lambeau Field	Recap
2	September 20	Cincinnati Bengals	L 24–31	1–1	Lambeau Field	Recap
3	September 27	at St. Louis Rams	W 36–17	2–1	Edward Jones Dome	Recap
4	October 5	at Minnesota Vikings	L 23–30	2–2	Hubert H. Humphrey Metrodome	Recap
5	Bye					
6	October 18	Detroit Lions	W 26–0	3–2	Lambeau Field	Recap
7	October 25	at Cleveland Browns	W 31–3	4–2	Cleveland Browns Stadium	Recap
8	November 1	Minnesota Vikings	L 26–38	4–3	Lambeau Field	Recap
9	November 8	at Tampa Bay Buccaneers	L 28–38	4–4	Raymond James Stadium	Recap
10	November 15	Dallas Cowboys	W 17–7	5–4	Lambeau Field	Recap
11	November 22	San Francisco 49ers	W 30–24	6–4	Lambeau Field	Recap
12	November 26	at Detroit Lions	W 34–12	7–4	Ford Field	Recap
13	December 7	Baltimore Ravens	W 27–14	8–4	Lambeau Field	Recap
14	December 13	at Chicago Bears	W 21–14	9–4	Soldier Field	Recap
15	December 20	at Pittsburgh Steelers	L 36–37	9–5	Heinz Field	Recap
16	December 27	Seattle Seahawks	W 48–10	10–5	Lambeau Field	Recap
17	January 3, 2010	at Arizona Cardinals	W 33–7	11–5	University of Phoenix Stadium	Recap

== Standings ==
NFC North
	W	L	T	PCT	DIV	CONF	PF	PA	STK
^{(2)} Minnesota Vikings	12	4	0	.750	5–1	9–3	470	312	W1
^{(5)} Green Bay Packers	11	5	0	.688	4–2	9–3	461	297	W2
Chicago Bears	7	9	0	.438	3–3	5–7	327	375	W2
Detroit Lions	2	14	0	.125	0–6	1–11	262	494	L6

== Regular season ==
=== Week 1: vs. Chicago Bears ===
Week One: Chicago Bears at Green Bay Packers – Game summary

- Game time: 8:15 pm EDT/7:15 pm CDT
- Game weather: 76 °F (24 °C), Mostly clear
- TV announcers (NBC): Al Michaels, Cris Collinsworth, and Andrea Kremer
- Game attendance: 70,920 at Lambeau Field, Green Bay, Wisconsin
- Referee: Ron Winter

First quarter

- No scoring play

Second quarter

- GB – 8:18 – Mason Crosby 52 yd FG (GB 3–0)
- CHI – 5:52 – safety, Aaron Rodgers tackled in end zone by Danieal Manning (GB 3–2)
- GB – 4:36 – Ryan Grant 1 yd TD run (Crosby kick) (GB 10–2)

Third quarter

- CHI – 10:14 – 36 yd TD pass from Jay Cutler to Devin Hester (Gould kick) (GB 10–9)
- CHI – 3:51 – Robbie Gould 47 yd FG (CHI 12–10)

Fourth quarter

- GB – 10:10 – Mason Crosby 39 yd FG (GB 13–12)
- CHI – 2:35 – Robbie Gould 21 yd FG (CHI 15–13)
- GB – 1:11 – 50 yd TD pass from Aaron Rodgers to Greg Jennings (Rodgers-Jennings pass) (GB 21–15)

	1	2	3	4	Total
Bears	0	2	10	3	15
Packers	0	10	0	11	21

Top passers

- CHI – Jay Cutler – 17/36, 277 yards, 1 TD, 4 INTs
- GB – Aaron Rodgers – 17/28, 184 yards, 1 TD

Top rushers

- CHI – Matt Forte – 25 carries, 55 yards
- GB – Ryan Grant – 16 carries, 61 yards, 1 TD

Top receivers

- CHI – Earl Bennett – 7 receptions, 66 yards
- GB – Greg Jennings – 6 receptions, 106 yards, 1 TD

Top tacklers

- CHI – Danieal Manning (6)
- GB – Brandon Chillar (7)

The Packers' 2009 season started at home against their hated division rival, the Chicago Bears, on Sunday Night Football.

The Packers received the ball first but had to settle for a 49-yard field goal attempt on their first drive of the season, but kicker Mason Crosby failed to convert the kick wide left. After the missed attempt the Packers new 3–4 defense took the field for the first time in the regular season and held Jay Cutler and the Bears to a 3 and out. After a minimal drive by the Packers, following the Bears punt, the Bears retook possession of the ball at the Chicago 18-yard line. After moving the ball to the Bears 31-yard line, Cutler forced a throw into coverage intended for tight end Desmond Clark. Safety Nick Collins intercepted the pass and returned the ball to the Packers 43-yard line.

Both teams continued to trade fairly ineffective offensive series throughout the first half up until 8:22 in the second quarter where Mason Crosby converted a 52-yard field goal to give the Packers the early 3–0 lead. On the Bears next drive, Cutler completed a 68-yard pass to wide receiver Johnny Knox down to the Packers 8-yard line. With the Bears looking to score in the red zone, the Packers pressured Cutler enough to force an errant throw into the Packers defensive line. Defensive end Johnny Jolly intercepted the pass and returned the ball for two yards to the Packers 14-yard line. Though the interception prevented a possible Bears touchdown, three plays later Packers quarterback Aaron Rodgers was sacked in the end zone by safety Danieal Manning for a Bears safety decreasing the Packers lead to a 3–2 advantage.

After the safety, the ball was punted back to the Bears and returned to the Bears 44-yard line by return man Devin Hester. On third down of the Bears next possession, cornerback Tramon Williams intercepted another forced Cutler throw and returned the ball to the Bears 1-yard line. On the next play, Packers running back Ryan Grant rushed left end for 1 yard and scored the Packers first touchdown of the season to take a 10–2 lead. Both teams exchanged offensive possessions for the last 4:40 of the half but neither managed to add any more points to the score. The Packers went into the half with a 10–2 lead.

After the half, the Bears received the ball. Ten plays into the Bears drive, Jay Cutler connected with Devin Hester on a 36-yard pass down the right sideline for their first touchdown of the season. With the touchdown and the extra point, the Bears decreased the Packer lead to 10–9. After the Bears touchdown, the Packer offense still seemed to have trouble moving the ball and had to settle for punting the ball after a sack and two incomplete passes. On the next Bears drive, the Bears converted a 47-yard field goal to take a 12–10 lead over the Packers. The Packers offense took the field aiming to retake the lead, but stalled again around midfield.

In the fourth quarter, with the Packers offense unable to move the ball and the defense lacking the plays that it made in the first half, it looked like the tides were turning in the Bears favor. The Bears then took over the ball at their own 27-yard line, but the Packers defense held stout and forced the Bears to punt. Before the punt though, the Bears center was watching rookie first-round pick Clay Matthews III run of the field. Thinking that there were 12 Packers on the field, he snapped the ball to the Bears running back Garrett Wolfe who then tried to advance the ball, but was stopped by the Packers. Bears coach Lovie Smith challenged that the Packers had too many players on the field, but instant replays showed that Matthews got off the field of play before the ball was snapped thus giving the Packers the ball at the Bears 26-yard line. After a couple of plays and a holding penalty on the Packers, they had to settle for the field goal in which Mason Crosby converted to give the Packers a slim 13–12 lead. On the Bears next drive, they matched the Packers recent score on a 21-yard field goal to regain the lead from the Packers at 15–13.

With 2:35 remaining in the game, the Packers received the ball. after a couple of decent gains the Packers offense looked slightly more confident than their previous series in the game. The dagger was then put into the Bears heart when quarterback Aaron Rodgers connected with Greg Jennings on a 50-yard touchdown pass paired with a Jennings two-point conversion reception gave the Packers a 21–15 lead in the dying minutes.

The Bears offense took the field in a last attempt to win the game, but Jay Cutler's debut start for the Bears would get even worse when his first pass of the drive was intercepted by cornerback Al Harris and returned to the Bears 14-yard line.

The Packers then lined up in the victory formation to take a nail biting and sloppy 21–15 win against their division rival Chicago Bears to start the season with a 1–0 record.

During the contest, Packers starting safety Atari Bigby injured his knee and is expected to miss at least four weeks. Bears star linebacker Brian Urlacher also dislocated his wrist and will reportedly miss the remainder of the season.

=== Week 2: vs. Cincinnati Bengals ===
Week Two: Cincinnati Bengals at Green Bay Packers – Game summary

- Game time: 1:00 pm EDT/12:00 pm CDT
- Game weather: 68 °F (20 °C), Sunny
- TV announcers (CBS): Ian Eagle & Rich Gannon
- Game attendance: 70,678 at Lambeau Field, Green Bay, Wisconsin
- Referee: Ed Hochuli

First quarter

- CIN – 8:31 – 5-yard TD pass from Carson Palmer to Laveranues Coles (Graham kick) (CIN 7–0)
- GB – 3:23 – 3-yard TD pass from Aaron Rodgers to Donald Driver (Crosby kick) (7–7)
- GB – 2:22 – Ryan Grant 4-yard TD run (Crosby kick) (GB 14–7)

Second quarter

- CIN – 10:21 – Carson Palmer 1-yard TD run (Graham kick) (14–14)
- GB – 7:46 – Charles Woodson 37-yard interception return (Crosby kick) (GB 21–14)
- CIN – 1:24 – 5-yard TD pass from Carson Palmer to Chris Henry (Graham kick) (21–21)

Third quarter

- CIN – 1:09 – 13-yard TD pass from Carson Palmer to Chad Ochocinco (Graham kick) (CIN 28–21)

Fourth quarter

- CIN – 1:56 – Shane Graham 40-yard FG (CIN 31–21)
- GB – 0:45 – Mason Crosby 45-yard FG (CIN 31–24)

	1	2	3	4	Total
Bengals	7	14	7	3	31
Packers	14	7	0	3	24

Top passers

- CIN – Carson Palmer – 15/23, 185 yards, 3 TD, 2 INTs
- GB – Aaron Rodgers – 21/39, 261 yards, 1 TD

Top rushers

- CIN – Cedric Benson – 29 carries, 141 yards
- GB – Ryan Grant – 14 carries, 46 yards, 1 TD

Top receivers

- CIN – Chad Ochocinco – 4 receptions, 91 yards, 1 TD
- GB – Donald Driver – 6 receptions, 99 yards, 1 TD

Top tacklers

- CIN – Dhani Jones (8)
- GB – Charles Woodson (10)

After defeating the Bears in their season opener, the Packers faced the 0–1 Cincinnati Bengals in a week 2 contest at Lambeau Field. During the week leading up to the game, Bengals star wide receiver Chad Ochocinco said in an interview that he'll do a celebratory "Lambeau Leap" into the end zone seats if he scores in Sunday's game at Lambeau Field.

The Packers started the contest with the ball, but could only manage to move the ball to mid field before they settled for a punt. The Bengals offense then took to the field at their own 37-yard line and after moving the ball into the Packers red zone, Carson Palmer managed to hit Laveranues Coles on a short 5-yard pass in the center of the end zone to take an early 7–0 lead. The Packers managed to match the Bengals drive though, by capping an 11-play, 80-yard drive with a 3-yard pass by Aaron Rodgers to Donald Driver along the right sideline of the end zone. The score was now tied a 7–7. The Bengals regained possession after the Packers touchdown, but on the first play of their corresponding drive Carson Palmer attempted a pass to wide receiver Chad Ochocinco along the right sideline, but Packers cornerback Charles Woodson stepped in front of Ochocinco and intercepted the attempted pass. Woodson then returned the ball down to the Bengals 11-yard line for a return of 22 yards. Two plays later, Packers running back Ryan Grant scored a touchdown on a 4-yard run outside of the left guard to take a 14–7 lead. After the Grant touchdown, both teams exchanged possessions into the second quarter.

On the Bengals second drive after the Ryan Grant touchdown run, quarterback Carson Palmer capped the Bengals drive with a 1-yard sneak up the middle for a touchdown to re-tie the contest at 14–14. The Packers offense again sputtered and couldn't find the rhythm that the offense once possessed a season ago. After the punt, Carson Palmer was sacked for a loss of 8 yards and then on the next play Charles Woodson intercepted another pass along the right sideline from Palmer and returned the ball 37 yards for the Packers first defensive score of the season to retake the lead 21–14. On the Bengals next drive though, they would then retake the lead again on a 5-yard Palmer pass to Chris Henry in the back of the end zone. The score was now tied 21–21. The Packers offense retook the field aiming to break the tie before halftime, but only could manage to give kicker Mason Crosby a 55-yard attempt in which he missed as the clock expired. The teams went into the half tied at 21.

After the half, the Bengals offense took to the field first but was forced to punt. The Packers responded by moving the ball quite efficiently, but their drive came to an end when Ryan Grant fumbled after pulling in a short Aaron Rodgers pass. The Bengals then managed to capitalize on the Packers first turn over of the season by putting together a 12-play, 62-yard drive capped by another Carson Palmer touchdown pass, this time to wide receiver Chad Ochocinco. After the touchdown, Ochocinco ran behind the endzone looking for a place to Lambeau Leap finally settling for a group of Bengals fans in the right corner of the endzone. Both teams exchanged possession without scoring through the end of the third quarter.

With both teams unable to score into the fourth quarter, the Bengals finally converted a field goal with 2 minutes left in game. to take a 31–21 lead. After the field goal, the Packers took over and managed to get the ball into field goal range in which Packers coach decided to kick the field goal to decrease the lead to 7 needing an onside kick recovery to tie the game anyway. The Mason Crosby kick was successful and the Packers special teams unit then lined up in the onside kick formation. Mason Crosby kicked the ball the right side and the ball hopped right to Packers corner back Tramon Williams for the recovery. With 45 seconds remaining, The Packers offense took the field with no timeouts. Rodgers then completed a couple of passes and moved the ball past midfield with 16 seconds remaining. Rodgers then completed a 25-yard strike to Donald Driver in the center of the field for 25 yards down to the Bengals 10-yard line. Hurrying down field the Packers snapped the ball with 1 second remaining but the Packers were flagged for a false start. With the penalty the remaining time was run off the clock and the game ended.

What could have been a memorable comeback instead ended in defeat, as the Packers suffered their first loss of the season, falling 31–24 to drop to 1–1. The result also marked the first time the Packers had lost to the Bengals at home.

During the contest, Packers starting safety Nick Collins injured his shoulder and veteran starting left tackle Chad Clifton injured his ankle.

=== Week 3: at St. Louis Rams ===
	1	2	3	4	Total
Packers	9	14	0	13	36
Rams	0	14	3	0	17

at Edward Jones Dome, St. Louis, Missouri

- Game time: 1:00 pm EDT/12:00 pm CDT
- Game weather: Indoors
- Game attendance: 60,234
- Referee: Walt Coleman
- TV announcers (Fox): Chris Myers and Trent Green

A week after losing to the Cincinnati Bengals, the Packers traveled down to St. Louis, Missouri to face the 0–2 St. Louis Rams.

The game started with the Rams offense in possession after Danny Amendola returned the initial kickoff to the Rams 43-yard line. The Rams moved the ball down to the Packers 31-yard line but had to settle for the field goal. The attempt though was blocked by the Packers Johnny Jolly and recovered by Will Blackmon. Blackmon returned the ball to the Packers 43-yard line and the Packers offense took to the field. The Packers offense fluttered out at the Rams 30-yard line in which the Packers field goal unit took to the field. Kicker Mason Crosby converted the 48-yard field goal for the Packers to take the early 3–0 lead. The game then resumed with the Rams in possession. after an initial holding penalty on first down, Steven Jackson then ran for no gain and caught a pass for 4 yards. On third down Rams quarterback Marc Bulger was hit by Aaron Kampman in which Bulger fumbled the ball. Defensive end Johnny Jolly then recovered the fumble at the Rams 15-yard line. The Packers offense then took to the field in the Rams red zone, but after a short run by Ryan Grant and an incomplete pass to Donald Driver, Aaron Rodgers was sacked for a loss of 12 yards and the Packers had to settle for a 38-yard field goal attempt in which Mason Crosby successfully converted to extend the Packers lead to 6–0. The Rams then took to the field looking to make up for the turn over, but the Rams luck took another turn for the worse on the first play of the drive in which running back Steven Jackson was stripped by Cullen Jenkins. The fumble was then recovered by Packers cornerback Al Harris. The Rams quarterback Marc Bulger was injured on the play and did not return to the game. Similar to the last time the Packers took over possession in the red zone, the offense failed to move the ball much and had to settle for another field goal. Crosby's third field goal of the day was successful to give the Packers a 9–0 lead to end the first quarter.

On the first Rams possession of the 2nd quarter, the offense now led by backup quarterback Kyle Boller managed to get two first downs, but came up short on an incomplete pass to Steven Jackson and had to settle for a punt. The Packers took to the field and on the second play of the drive, Aaron Rodgers threw deep left to Donald Driver in which he made a miraculous one handed grab for 46 yards. After a 12-yard pass completion to Jordy Nelson a 12-yard scramble by Aaron Rodgers and a 5-yard run by Ryan Grant, Rodgers handed the ball off to fullback John Kuhn up the middle followed by a fake pitch right to Ryan Grant. The defense was sold by the fake pitch and John Kuhn charged forward into the end zone for the game's first touchdown. The extra point was successful and the Packers took a 16–0 lead. The Rams then responded though on their corresponding drive by completing a 16-yard pass from Kyle Boller to Daniel Fells for the touchdown to decrease the Packers lead to 16–7. On the Packers next drive, Rodgers completed a 50-yard pass to Greg Jennings down the right sideline and capped the drive with a 21-yard pass to a streaking Donald Driver in the left corner of the end zone. Crosby converted the extra point and the lead was extended to 23–7. With the Packers in a prevent defense, the Rams managed to move the ball quite successfully down the field down to the Packers 19-yard line with 8 seconds remaining in the half. The Rams then scored another touchdown when Kyle Boller connected again for 19 yards to Daniel Fells, this time in the left side of the end zone just inside the goal line. This would be the last score of the half and the Packers went into the half with a 23–14 lead.

The Packers didn't manage to move the ball much on the first possession of the third quarter and had to settle for their first punt of the game. The Rams move the ball down to the Packers 35-yard line, but in the end had to settle for a 53-yard field goal decreasing the Packers lead to 23–17. Both teams didn't manage to move the ball much and traded punts throughout the rest of the third quarter.

On the first play of the fourth quarter though, Rodgers connected with Greg Jennings again deep middle for 53 yards down to the Rams 17-yard line. Four plays later, Aaron Rodgers scampered up the middle on a four-yard run for a touchdown. Mason Crosby missed the extra point though, raising the Packer lead to 29–17. The Rams took to the field but didn't manage to convert a first down and punted the ball. The Packers didn't manage much either on their next drive converting only one first down, a came up a yard short for a second first down and settled for a punt. The Rams took over on their own 15-yard line, but on a third a six at their 19-yard line, Charles Woodson stepped in front of Danny Amendola crossing the middle of the field and intercepted the Kyle Boller pass. After a 13-yard pass to Donald Driver and a 5-yard run by Ryan Grant, Aaron Rodgers hit John Kuhn in the right side of the end zone for Rodgers second touchdown pass of the day. The Packers took the 36–17 lead with the added extra point. The Rams couldn't convert on fourth down of their following drive and the Packers took over 1st down. The Packers offense then took to the field and after five Ryan Grant runs, Aaron Rodgers kneeled twice to run out the clock.

With the 36–17 win over the St. Louis Rams, the Packers increased their record to 2–1 heading into a Monday Night Football showdown against the 3–0 Minnesota Vikings led by longtime former Packers starting quarterback Brett Favre.

=== Week 4: at Minnesota Vikings ===
	1	2	3	4	Total
Packers	7	7	0	9	23
Vikings	7	14	7	2	30

at Hubert H. Humphrey Metrodome, Minneapolis, Minnesota

- Game time: 8:30 pm EDT/7:30 pm CDT
- Game weather: Indoors
- Game attendance: 63,846
- Referee: Gene Steratore
- TV announcers (ESPN): Mike Tirico, Ron Jaworski, & Jon Gruden

With both teams coming off of wins, the 2–1 Green Bay Packers will travel to Minneapolis, Minnesota to face the 3–0 Minnesota Vikings in a Monday Night Football showdown. The Vikings will be led by starting quarterback Brett Favre.

The game started with the Packers in possession. After the offense moved the ball consistently down field to the Minnesota 24-yard line, but Aaron Rodgers was then sacked by two Vikings defenders for a 9-yard loss and fumbled the football. The ball was recovered by Vikings linebacker Chad Greenway at the Vikings 33-yard line. After the turnover, Brett Favre took to the field clad in purple. The Vikings too seemed to also be able to move the ball just as effectively with multiple short runs by running back Adrian Peterson and throws by Brett Favre. The Vikings finally capped the 12-play, 67-yard drive with a 1-yard touchdown pass short left from Brett Favre to tight end Visanthe Shiancoe. With the score, the Vikings took the early 7–0 lead.

The Packers then took to the field looking to make up for the turnover on their first possession of the game. On 3rd and 5 after an incompletion to Greg Jennings and a 5-yard run by fullback John Kuhn, Aaron Rodgers fired a pass to second year tight end Jermichael Finley deep middle in which he caught around the Vikings 35-yard line and then ran the ball the rest of the way into the end zone for a Packers 62-yard touchdown. With the extra point the game was now tied 7–7.

The Vikings took to the field again, but after two incompletions and a completion for a 5-yard loss the Vikings were forced to punt. The Packers then took over at the Minnesota 43-yard line. The Packers again managed to move the ball quite effectively against the Vikings defense but like the first drive of the game, the drive ended with a turn over. This time it was an attempted short right pass to Greg Jennings from Aaron Rodgers that was intercepted by Antoine Winfield at the Vikings 23-yard line. Similar to the last drive after the Packers turned over the ball, the Vikings managed to move the ball effortlessly down to the Packers 14-yard line in which Brett Favre then connected with wide receiver Sidney Rice for Favre's second touchdown strike against the Packers. With the score the Vikings retook the lead at 14–7.

The Packers then took to the field looking again to make up for another costly turnover, but the offense failed to move the ball and Aaron Rodgers was sacked on 3rd down forcing the Packers to punt. The Packers would level the score though on the Vikings next offensive play of the game. Vikings running back Adrian Peterson ran wide left and was stacked up behind the line of scrimmage. While he was being stopped, Packers rookie linebacker Clay Matthews ripped the ball away from Peterson and returned the ball untouched 42 yards for the Packers tying touchdown at 14–14.

On the Vikings next possession looking to retake the lead, Favre and company compiled together a drive highlighted by a 43-yard pass from Brett Favre to Percy Harvin down to the Packers 3-yard line. On the next play, Favre dropped back to pass and the ball was intercepted by Packers cornerback Charles Woodson in the center of the end zone but the play was nullified by a defensive pass interference call paired with a defensive offside penalty. The pass inference penalty was accepted and the ball was placed on the Packers 1-yard line. On the next play Vikings running back Adrian Peterson rushed up the middle for the score to give the Vikings a 21–14 lead. The Packers took over with little time remaining but still attempted to put points on the board. After a 14-yard pass to Greg Jennings down to the Vikings 48-yard line, Aaron Rodgers took the team's final timeout with 1 second remaining. On the final play of the half Rodgers tossed a deep ball into a group of players the right corner of the end zone but the ball fell incomplete ending the half 21–14 in favor of the Vikings.

The Vikings received the ball at the start of the second half, and managed to still move the ball effectively against the Packers defense that was getting virtually no pressure on Brett Favre. On second and ten at the Green Bay 44-yard line, Brett Favre connected with Jeff Dugan to the Green Bay 31 for 25 yards and then capped the drive with a 31-yard strike to receiver Bernard Berrian deep left for a touchdown to extend the Vikings lead to 28–14.

The Packers then took to the field and managed to move the ball down field highlighted by a 24-yard pass to Donald Driver and a 20-yard pass to Ryan Grant down to the Minnesota 5-yard line setting the team up first and goal at the Vikings 5-yard line. On first down Ryan Grant ran up the middle for a four-yard gain. On second down the Packers tried a trick play that looked like a run wide right for Grant, but Rodgers handed the ball off to fullback John Kuhn who ran up the middle but the Vikings were not fooled and Kuhn's attempt to score a touchdown was stopped when his knee hit down at the line of scrimmage before lunging into the endzone. On third down, Rodgers connected with tight end Jermichael Finley who ran an out route to the right, but was tackled right after the reception at the line of scrimmage by Vikings linebacker Ben Leber for no gain. The Packers then choose to go for it on fourth down rather than settling the field goal. On the play, Rodgers looked right, then back left and passed to Packers tight end Donald Lee short middle, but Lee failed to catch the pass resulting in loss of downs and the Vikings took over possession at their 1-yard line.

On the Vikings next drive that continued on into the final quarter of play, the Vikings managed to move the ball out of their own end zone down to their own 37-yard line, but the drive stalled on a 5-yard completed screen pass short of the first down marker on 3rd and 10. The Packers took over at their own 15-yard line, and Rodgers was sacked on first down. On second down Ryan Grant ran up the middle for 10 yards making up for the lost yardage on the sack and more. The drive came to an end though on the next play when quarterback Aaron Rodgers pretended to walk toward the sideline and the ball was directly snapped to backup running back DeShawn Wynn. Wynn managed to gain 6 yards on 3rd and 7, but falling a yard short on the trick play the Packers were forced to punt.

The Viking offense then took to the field again, but the Packers defense held the Vikings on third down and they too were forced to punt. After another stellar punt by Vikings punter Chris Kluwe, the Packers were again pinned deep in their own end at their own 1-yard line. After two unsuccessful plays for no gain on first and second down, Aaron Rodgers was sacked by Jared Allen at the goal line and fumbled the football. The ball was recovered by the Vikings, but the ruling on the field was challenged by the Packers that the ground had caused the fumble. The ruling on the field was then changed to a safety rather than giving the Vikings the ball at the Packers 1-yard line and the Vikings extended their lead to 30–14.

After the safety the Packers kicked off and the Vikings took over at their 40-yard line. The Packers managed to again hold the Vikings defense to a three and out and the ball was punted back to the Packers. On the Packers next possession, Ryan Grant started off the drive with a 15-yard run, and Jermichael Finley caught a 37-yard pass from Rodgers two plays later. Three plays later after an 11-yard rush by Aaron Rodgers and an incomplete pass, Rodgers connected with second year wide receiver Jordy Nelson for a 33-yard touchdown strike. After a failed two-point conversion pass to Ryan Grant the Vikings lead was decreased to 30–20.

The Packers then tried a failed onside kick and the Vikings took over the ball with 3:39 remaining in the game, but due to poor clock management by the Vikings they were held to a three and out and only had run 29 seconds off of the game clock after the punt. The Packers took over at their own 18-yard line with 3:10 remaining in the contest. On first play of the drive, Rodgers connected with Donald Driver for 10 yards which with the reception tied Sterling Sharpe's club career high receptions total with 595. On third and 12 at their own 26-yard line, Rodgers hit James Jones in the middle of the field in which he then took the ball to the Minnesota 40 for 34 yards. Five plays later after Rodgers threw the ball away on third down, Mason Crosby converted a 31-yard field goal to decrease the Vikings lead to 30–23.

The Packers attempted their second onside kick of the game with 55 seconds remaining, but the kick was again recovered by the Vikings ending all chances of a comeback. The Vikings then lined up in the victory formation and ran out the clock to defeat the Packers 30–23.

During the contest, Packers return specialist Will Blackmon suffered a season ending knee injury.

With the loss, the Packers go into their bye week with a 2–2 record sitting in third place in the NFC North behind the 4–0 Minnesota Vikings and the 3–1 Chicago Bears.

=== Week 6: vs. Detroit Lions ===
	1	2	3	4	Total
Lions	0	0	0	0	0
Packers	14	9	3	0	26

at Lambeau Field, Green Bay, Wisconsin

- Game time: 1:00 pm EDT/12:00 pm CDT
- Game weather: 46 °F (8 °C), Sunny
- Game attendance: 70,801
- Referee: Jerome Boger
- TV announcers (Fox): Kenny Albert, Daryl Johnston, & Tony Siragusa

After the bye week, the Packers returned home to face the 1–4 Detroit Lions. Offensive tackle Chad Clifton returned to the starting lineup along with safety Atari Bigby after each had missed the last two and three games respectively. Starting center Jason Spitz was inactive with an injury.

Starting off the contest, the Packers received the ball in which kickoff returner Jordy Nelson returned 99 yards for a touchdown, but the score was nullified by a holding penalty and the offense took to the field starting at their own 20-yard line. On the opening drive, quarterback Aaron Rodgers converted the first third down of the drive with a 26-yard pass to Greg Jennings to the Packers 49-yard line. Three plays later on the second third down of the drive, Rodgers hit James Jones who was wide open along the right sideline underneath the safety's coverage. Jones then evaded the last defender and scored the first touchdown of the day to give the Packers an early 7–0 lead.

On the Lions first possession of the game, backup quarterback Daunte Culpepper who started in place of the Lions rookie starting quarterback Matthew Stafford was pressured on their first third down and forced a short errant pass intended for Lions running back Kevin Smith. The pass was intercepted by the Packers defensive end Cullen Jenkins at the Detroit 21 and returned to the 17 for 4 yards.

Starting in the red zone after the turnover, Packers wide receiver Donald Driver caught a pass on the left sideline on second down for 5 yards down to the Detroit 6-yard line for a 1st down but an unnecessary roughness penalty moved the Packers back 15 yards to the Detroit 21-yard line. The reception was significant though in that with the reception Donald Driver passed former Packers wide receiver Sterling Sharpe on the club's all time receptions list to take top honors. The drive then continued with an 8-yard reception from Jermichael Finley a four-yard run by Ryan Grant and another 8-yard reception by Finley. The drive was then capped off with a 1-yard touchdown pass short left to fullback John Kuhn. With the score the Packers took a 14–0 lead.

Both teams then went on to exchange possessions with no real key moments on into the second quarter. The Lions failed to move the ball with any effectiveness while the Packers key downfall were penalties that set the offense up in unfavorable down and distance situations.

With 10:26 remaining in the half, the Packers offense took to the field and the first play of the drive was a 17-yard pass to Greg Jennings down to the Lions 29-yard line. The drive stalled though three plays later when Aaron Rodgers was sacked for no gain on third down and the Packers had to settle for a 46-yard field goal in which kicker Mason Crosby converted successfully. The score was now 17–0 in the Packers favor.

On the Lions next drive, Lions running back Kevin Smith ran for 19 yards on second down which moved the ball out to the Detroit 38, but Daunte Culpepper was sacked on third down for a 4-yard loss by rookie linebacker Clay Matthews and they were forced to punt. The Packers took to the field in excellent field position after the punt was returned by Tramon Williams to the Lions 29-yard line. After minimal success in the red zone again, the Packers failed to convert on third down and had to settle for another field goal to increase the lead to 20–0.

On the Lions next possession, they failed to convert on third down yet again and set up a 4th and 3 at their own 45-yard line. Unhappy with the team's offensive struggles the Lions choose to go for it on fourth down but were shut down by the Packers defense for a 1-yard loss. The Packers offense then took to the field in their opponents end for the second straight drive. The drive was started with two receptions by tight end Jermichael Finley a 5-yard catch and then a 30-yard catch down to the Detroit 8-yard line. Aaron Rodgers spiked the ball to stop the clock with 19 seconds remaining in the half. On the next offensive play though, Rodgers was sacked for a 5-yard loss forcing them to use their last timeout. On third and three at the Lions 13-yard line, Rodgers attempted a pass to the right side of the end zone to wide receiver Brett Swain but the pass was out of reach and the Packers had to settle for yet another field goal in which Crosby converted to extend the lead to 23–0 right before halftime.

On the first drive of the third quarter, Daunte Culpepper scrambled out of the pocket and ran for 5 yards. On the run, Daunte noticeably slowed before running out of bounds and was later replaced by Lions third-string quarterback Drew Stanton. After a Stanton incomplete pass, the Lions punted the ball on fourth down.

The Packers offense took to the field and Rodgers and Driver connected multiple times during the drive for gains of 18 and 27 yards. Donald Lee also had an 18-yard grab. On third and five at the Detroit nine-yard line, Rodgers passed short to Driver and only managed to advance the ball for one yard before being tackled. The offense yet again stalled and had to settle for yet another Mason Crosby field goal to extend the lead to 26–0.

Detroit then took to the field again with Drew Stanton still leading their offense. On the second play of the possession, Stanton passed deep left to tight end Brandon Pettigrew in which the pass hit the receiver but popped up into the air and fell into the waiting arms of Packers cornerback Al Harris for the interception.

The Packers then took over and managed to move the ball effectively yet again with the drive highlighted by an amazing one hand catch by Donald Driver for 37 yards down the left sideline. The great catch was then followed by a 9-yard grab by Spencer Havner and a 9-yard grab by Greg Jennings which set the Packers up 1st and goal at the Lions three-yard line. On first down though Rodgers dropped back to pass but was hit and sacked by Julian Peterson. Rodgers fumbled and the ball was recovered by Larry Foote at the Detroit 15.

On the Lions next possession which extended into the fourth quarter, the Packers put the pressure on Drew Stanton sacking him twice with the second sack by Al Harris on third down ending the drive.

The Packers then took to the field running the ball looking to run out the clock and possibly ignite their previously ineffective running game. After a couple of decent carries by Ryan Grant, Rodgers then dropped back to pass and threw a pass short middle that was intended for wide receiver James Jones. Lions linebacker DeAndre Levy who was in front of Jones intercepted the pass at the Lions 40 and returned it to 45 for 5 yards. He then fumbled the ball but recovered his own fumble for no gain.

After the interception, running back Kevin Smith rushed for 20 yards on 2nd down. In what was the best Lions attempt to put points on the board of the day, moving the ball all the way to the Packers 9-yard line Stanton forced a throw to Lions tight end Brandon Pettigrew in the center of the end zone and Packers safety Atari Bigby intercepted the pass in the end zone for a touchback and the Packers offense took to the field at their own 20-yard line.

The Packers then ran the ball multiple times with Ryan Grant and Brandon Jackson to try to run down the clock. Jackson fumbled after a five-yard gain but the ball was fortunately recovered by Packers Jermichael Finley. Rodgers scampered for a 10-yard gain on the next play, but the yardage gained was nullified by a penalty an unsportsmanlike conduct penalty on Donald Driver after Rodgers had slid to the ground. Ryan Grant then rushed for a 22-yard gain followed by a couple more short rushes to run the play clock under 2 minutes. Rodgers then took two kneel downs and the game clock expired to give the Packers a 26–0 win.

Chad Clifton suffered another injury setback during the contest late in the second half and was held out of the rest of the game. Wide receiver Jordy Nelson also injured his right leg in the contest.

With the win, the Packers increased their record to 3–2 on the season and move ahead into second place in the division (based on head to head, division and conference records) ahead of the 3–2 Chicago Bears who lost to the Atlanta Falcons on Sunday Night Football. Both teams still trail behind the 6–0 Minnesota Vikings.

=== Week 7: at Cleveland Browns ===
	1	2	3	4	Total
Packers	0	21	3	7	31
Browns	0	3	0	0	3

at Cleveland Browns Stadium, Cleveland, Ohio

- Game time: 1:00 pm EDT/12:00 pm CDT
- Game weather: 50 °F (10 °C), sunny
- Game attendance: 69,797
- Referee: Don Carey
- TV announcers (Fox): Ron Pitts and John Lynch

In week seven, the Packers traveled to Cleveland, Ohio to face the 1–5 Cleveland Browns at Cleveland Browns Stadium.

The Browns started off the contest with the ball at their own 45-yard line after Packers kicker Mason Crosby kicked the ball out of bounds on the opening kickoff. The Browns couldn't manage to move the ball effectively on their first possession though failing to convert their first third down of the game and had to settle for a punt.

After the punt the Packers took over at their own 14-yard line and ran the ball on ten of the eleven plays of their first drive, moving the ball all the way down to the Cleveland 32-yard line where backup running back Brandon Jackson came up a yard short on a third and three. The Packers offense stayed on the field and quarterback Aaron Rodgers attempted a quarterback sneak up the middle but the attempt failed to gain any yards and the ball was turned over on downs.

Cleveland's second drive of the game was more successful than the previous, with the biggest gain of the drive coming on a 22-yard pass from quarterback Derek Anderson to wide receiver Mohamed Massaquoi who beat Packers cornerback Al Harris on a square in route. Harris also grabbed Massaquoi's face mask on the tackle and the Packers were penalized 15 yards for the infraction. The Browns managed to advance the ball down deep into the red zone, but the Packers defense held the Browns out of the end zone and forced them to settle for a 22-yard field goal on the first play of the second quarter that hit the upright but deflected through to give the Browns an early 3–0 lead.

On the Packers' next drive, Aaron Rodgers and company moved the ball down to the Cleveland 48-yard line with a short pass to Donald Lee, a 13-yard pass to Donald Driver and a 6-yard pass to Greg Jennings. The drive was capped off with a short right pass from Aaron Rodgers to linebacker turned tight end Spencer Havner. Havner pulled in the pass and ran down the right sideline 45 yards for a touchdown to claim a 7–3 Packers lead.

The Browns then took over on offense trying to reclaim the lead from the Packers. After two incompletions and a 5-yard pass completion the Browns failed to reach the first down marker and looked to end the offensive series on a three and out. On the punt however, the Packers were penalized 5 yards for having 12 men on the field of play which gave the Browns a first down. The Browns still failed to capitalize on the Packers mistake by only gaining 4 yards on the next three plays and settled for another punt.

The Packers offense took over again at their own 14. On first down, running back Ryan Grant rushed for 6 yards and 4 on second down, but tight end Donald Lee was flagged for holding on the second rushing attempt, moving the Packers back 10 yards. Lee made up for his mistake on the new play though, hauling in a 19-yard reception for a first down. On the next play, Rodgers dropped back to pass and hit Donald Driver in stride between two defenders. Driver accelerated down field past an oncoming safety and into the end zone for a 71-yard touchdown to increase the Packers lead to 14–3.

The Browns offense took to the field to try to out-fox the Packers defense. On the sixth play of the drive though, quarterback Derek Anderson was intercepted by Packers cornerback Charles Woodson in which he returned down to the Browns 15-yard line for a 25-yard return. Ryan Grant then rushed the ball for nine yards on second down to the Browns 3-yard line to set up first and goal at the three. After an incomplete pass to Greg Jennings, Ryan Grant rushed for 2 more yards on second down falling a yard short of the touchdown. Rodgers then passed to Donald Driver on third and one but the pass was incomplete. Fortunately, the Browns defender covering Driver was flagged for pass inference and the Packer were rewarded with a first and goal at the 1-yard line. After a Grant run for no gain and a John Kuhn rush for no gain, Ryan Grant then managed to break the goal line on third down to score a touchdown for the Packers extending the lead even more to 21–3. The Browns took over with less than a minute remaining in the half but managed to have to settle for one final Hail Mary attempt into the end zone which was batted down incomplete to end the half with the Packers leading 21–3.

After the half, the Packers started out with possession and managed to move the ball down to the Browns 37-yard line with multiple short yardage gains both passing and rushing. After an offensive pass interference penalty on Donald Lee, the Packers failed to convert on third and 20 and had to settle for a 55-yard field goal attempt on which kicker Mason Crosby missed wide left.

The Browns then took over after the missed attempt and running back Jamal Lewis rushed for 4 yards on first and 4 on second down to set the Browns up with a 3rd and 2 on the Packers 47. On third down, Anderson dropped back to pass and threw a ball short right to wide receiver Josh Cribbs. Charles Woodson immediately hit Cribbs knocking the ball out of his possession. The ball was recovered by the Packers at the Packers 48 by Packers linebacker Brandon Chillar.

The Packers offense then got into another string of multiple rushing attempts in which was started out with a 15-yard carry by Grant. Rodgers also completed a 16-yard pass to Donald Lee on the drive which stalled when a short pass to Ryan Grant on third down and four only gained three yards down to the Browns 1-yard line. Crosby came onto the field and converted a chip shot field goal to extend the Packers lead to 24–3.

The Browns managed to move the ball much more effectively than previous attempts on their corresponding drive moving the ball all the way down into the red zone. In the drive that in which extended into the fourth quarter, The Browns offense was held on four straight attempts inside the Packers four-yard line. The drive ended when the Browns choose to go for it on fourth down at the one, but the Anderson pass flew over wide receiver Mohamed Massaquoi and out of the back of the end zone.

The Packers then took over at their own 1-yard line and managed to move the ball 99 yards for another touchdown. The drive was highlighted by an 18-yard pass to Jennings, a 14-yard pass to Spencer Havner and a 19-yard scamper by Aaron Rodgers down to the Browns 39-yard line. Ryan Grant broke loose on the next play of the drive for 37 yards down the right sideline to the Browns 5-yard line. Rodgers then connected with James Jones in the lower left corner of the end zone for the final touchdown of the game, which extended the lead to 31–3.

Both teams then continued to exchange rather meaningless possessions with the Packers offense now being run by backup quarterback Matt Flynn. The Packers final drive of the game started with 5:52 remaining on the clock and multiple rush attempts along with a Flynn pass to Jennings for 12 yards ran the clock down to 35 seconds. The Browns took over and rushed the ball once in which the game clock then expired to give the Packers their second successive victory, this time 31–3 over the Cleveland Browns.

During the contest second-year tight end Jermichael Finley and fourth-string wide receiver Brett Swain both were removed for the game because of knee injuries.

With the win, the Packers increased their record to 4–2 to hold onto second place in the division behind the Minnesota Vikings at 6–1, who lost to the Pittsburgh Steelers and ahead of the 3–3 Chicago Bears who also were defeated by the Cincinnati Bengals later in the day.

=== Week 8: vs. Minnesota Vikings ===
	1	2	3	4	Total
Vikings	7	10	7	14	38
Packers	3	0	17	6	26

at Lambeau Field, Green Bay, Wisconsin

- Game time: 4:15 pm EST/3:15 pm CST
- Game weather: 48 °F (9 °C) (Mostly Cloudy)
- Game attendance: 71,213
- Referee: Tony Corrente
- TV announcers (Fox): Thom Brennaman, Troy Aikman & Pam Oliver

Coming off their road win over the Browns, the Packers went home for the highly anticipated Week 8 divisional rematch with the Minnesota Vikings, as former Green Bay Packers quarterback Brett Favre made his return to face his former team.

The Packers got the game off to quick start in the first quarter as kicker Mason Crosby made a 37-yard field goal, but the Vikings responded with running back Adrian Peterson's 1-yard touchdown run. Things got worse for Green Bay in the second quarter as Favre completed a 12-yard touchdown pass to tight end Visanthe Shiancoe, followed by kicker Ryan Longwell (another former Packer) nailing a 41-yard field goal. The Packers would end the first half with 48 yards of offense, the lowest in over 10 years for a Packers team.

Minnesota would add onto their lead in the third quarter as Favre found wide receiver Percy Harvin on a 51-yard touchdown pass as 3 Packer defenders collided and hit the ground. Yet Green Bay began to rally as Crosby booted a 26-yard field goal, followed up by quarterback Aaron Rodgers completing a 16-yard and a 5-yard touchdown pass to tight end Spencer Havner. The Vikings would answer in the fourth quarter as Favre hooked up with tight end/fullback Jeff Dugan on a 2-yard touchdown pass. The Packers tried to rally as Rodgers connected with wide receiver Greg Jennings on a 10-yard touchdown pass (with a failed 2-point conversion), but Minnesota would put the game out of reach as Favre hooked up with wide receiver Bernard Berrian on a 16-yard touchdown pass. Favre threw 4 TD's with 0 INT, and had a passer rating of 128.

With the loss, Green Bay fell to 4–3 and were swept by the Vikings for the first time since 2005.

=== Week 9: at Tampa Bay Buccaneers ===
	1	2	3	4	Total
Packers	14	7	0	7	28
Buccaneers	7	10	0	21	38

at Raymond James Stadium, Tampa, Florida

- Game time: 1:00 pm EST/12:00 pm CST
- Game weather: 82 °F (28 °C) (Sunny)
- Game attendance: 62,994
- Referee: Pete Morelli
- TV announcers (Fox): Sam Rosen, Tim Ryan, & Chris Myers

Hoping to rebound from their home loss to the Vikings, the Packers flew to Raymond James Stadium for a Week 9 duel with the throwback-cladded Tampa Bay Buccaneers, who were looking for their first win of the season. In the first quarter, Green Bay struck first as quarterback Aaron Rodgers hooked up with wide receiver James Jones on a 74-yard touchdown pass. The Buccaneers would respond with quarterback Josh Freeman's 6-yard touchdown pass to running back Derrick Ward, yet the Packers regained the lead with a 2-yard touchdown run from running back Ryan Grant. Tampa Bay would tie the game again as cornerback Ronde Barber returned a blocked punt 31 yards for a touchdown, yet Green Bay kept replying as Rodgers completed a 32-yard touchdown pass to wide receiver Donald Driver. The Buccaneers would close out the half as kicker Connor Barth nailed a 38-yard field goal.

After a scoreless third quarter, Rodgers would give the Packers 12-yard touchdown run to begin the fourth quarter. However, Tampa Bay would take the lead as Freeman completed two 7-yard touchdown passes to tight end Kellen Winslow (with a failed two-point conversion) and wide receiver Sammie Stroughter (with a successful two-point conversion pass to wide receiver Michael Clayton). Green Bay tried to rally, but the Buccaneers would seal the win with safety Tanard Jackson returning an interception 35 yards for a touchdown.

With the loss, the Packers fell to 4–4. This would be the last time Rodgers threw a pick-six until Week 3 of the 2017 season and the last time he threw three interceptions in a single game until Week 15 of the 2017 season.

=== Week 10: vs. Dallas Cowboys ===
	1	2	3	4	Total
Cowboys	0	0	0	7	7
Packers	0	3	0	14	17

at Lambeau Field, Green Bay, Wisconsin

- Game time: 4:15 pm EST/3:15 pm CST
- Game weather: 47 °F (8 °C) (Clear)
- Game attendance: 70,894
- Referee: Jeff Triplette
- TV announcers (Fox): Joe Buck, Troy Aikman & Pam Oliver

Trying to snap a two-game losing streak, the Packers went home for a Week 10 duel with the Dallas Cowboys. Green Bay would get the only points of the first half in the form of a 48-yard field goal from kicker Mason Crosby. After a scoreless third quarter, the Packers would take a huge lead in the fourth quarter with quarterback Aaron Rodgers' 1-yard touchdown run and his 2-yard touchdown pass to tight end Spencer Havner. The Cowboys would try to rally with quarterback Tony Romo's 9-yard touchdown pass to wide receiver Roy Williams, Green Bay's defense would hold strong for a huge victory.

With the win, not only do the Packers improved to 5–4, but also the Packers finally beat Dallas for revenge after 5 years of losing since their meeting with the Cowboys in 2004.

=== Week 11: vs. San Francisco 49ers ===
Week Eleven: San Francisco 49ers at Green Bay Packers – Game summary

- Game time: 1:00 pm EDT/12:00 pm CDT
- Game weather: 53 °F (12 °C), Partly sunny
- TV announcers (Fox): Thom Brennaman and Brian Billick
- Game attendance: 70,445 at Lambeau Field, Green Bay, Wisconsin
- Referee: Scott Green

First quarter

- GB – 10:11 – Mason Crosby 23-yard FG (GB 3–0)
- SF – 7:39 – Joe Nedney 46-yard FG (3–3)
- GB – 2:26 – Mason Crosby 27-yard FG (GB 6–3)

Second quarter

- GB – 8:47 – 64-yard TD pass from Aaron Rodgers to Greg Jennings (Crosby kick) (GB 13–3)
- GB – 2:27 – 7-yard TD pass from Aaron Rodgers to Jordy Nelson (Crosby kick) (GB 20–3)
- GB – 0:00 – Mason Crosby 27-yard FG (GB 23–3)

Third quarter

- SF – 7:28 – 38-yard TD pass from Alex Smith to Michael Crabtree (Nedney kick) (GB 23–10)

Fourth quarter

- GB – 11:05 – Ryan Grant 1-yard TD run (Crosby kick) (GB 30–10)
- SF – 10:37 – 24-yard TD pass from Alex Smith to Vernon Davis (Nedney kick) (GB 30–17)
- SF – 5:56 – 10-yard TD pass from Alex Smith to Frank Gore (Nedney kick) (GB 30–24)

	1	2	3	4	Total
49ers	3	0	7	14	24
Packers	6	17	0	7	30

Top passers

- SF – Alex Smith – 16/33, 227 yards, 3 TD, 1 INT
- GB – Aaron Rodgers – 32/45, 344 yards, 2 TD

Top rushers

- SF – Frank Gore – 7 carries, 59 yards
- GB – Ryan Grant – 21 carries, 129 yards, 1 TD

Top receivers

- SF – Vernon Davis – 6 receptions, 108 yards, 1 TD
- GB – Greg Jennings – 5 receptions, 126 yards, 1 TD

Top tacklers

- SF – Michael Lewis (10)
- GB – Aaron Kampman (4)

Coming off their win over the Cowboys, the Packers stayed at home for a Week 11 duel with the San Francisco 49ers. In the first quarter, Green Bay began the game with a 23-yard field goal from kicker Mason Crosby. The 49ers would respond with kicker Joe Nedney nailing a 46-yard field goal, yet the Packers came back with Crosby's 27-yard field goal. In the second quarter, Green Bay would add onto their lead as quarterback Aaron Rodgers completed a 64-yard touchdown pass to wide receiver Greg Jennings and a 7-yard touchdown pass to wide receiver Jordy Nelson. Afterwards, Crosby would end the half with a 27-yard field goal.

San Francisco would begin to rally in the third quarter as quarterback Alex Smith completed a 38-yard touchdown pass to wide receiver Michael Crabtree, yet the Packers would answer in the fourth quarter as running back Ryan Grant got a 1-yard touchdown run. The 49ers tried to come back as Smith threw a 24-yard touchdown pass to tight end Vernon Davis and a 10-yard touchdown pass to running back Frank Gore, yet Green Bay's defense would prevent any further progress.

With the win, the Packers improved to 6–4.

=== Week 12: at Detroit Lions ===
Week Twelve: Green Bay Packers at Detroit Lions – Game summary

- Game time: 12:30 pm EDT/11:30 pm CDT
- Game weather: None (Domed Stadium)
- TV announcers (Fox): Joe Buck, Troy Aikman & Pam Oliver
- Game attendance: 57,383 at Ford Field, Detroit, Michigan
- Referee: Bill Leavy

First quarter

- DET – 13:04 – 1-yard TD pass from Matthew Stafford to Calvin Johnson (Hanson kick) (DET 7–0)

Second quarter

- GB – 14:54 – 7-yard TD pass from Aaron Rodgers to Donald Lee (Crosby kick) (7–7)
- GB – 6:12 – Mason Crosby 20-yard FG (GB 10–7)
- GB – 0:59 – Mason Crosby 25-yard FG (GB 13–7)

Third quarter

- GB – 6:38 – 7-yard TD pass from Aaron Rodgers to Donald Driver (Crosby kick) (GB 20–7)
- GB – 0:38 – 21-yard TD pass from Aaron Rodgers to James Jones (Crosby kick) (GB 27–7)

Fourth quarter

- DET – 9:18 – Louis Delmas tackled Ryan Grant in the end zone for a safety (GB 27–9)
- DET – 5:01 – Jason Hanson 22-yard FG (GB 27–12)
- GB – 3:47 – Charles Woodson 38-yard interception return (Crosby kick) (GB 34–12)

	1	2	3	4	Total
Packers	0	13	14	7	34
Lions	7	0	0	5	12

Top passers

- DET – Matthew Stafford – 20/43, 213 yards, 1 TD, 4 INT
- GB – Aaron Rodgers – 28/39, 348 yards, 3 TD

Top rushers

- DET – Kevin Smith – 18 carries, 43 yards
- GB – Ryan Grant – 20 carries, 61 yards

Top receivers

- DET – Dennis Northcutt – 2 receptions, 51 yards
- GB – Donald Driver – 7 receptions, 142 yards, 1 TD

Top tacklers

- DET – William James (11)
- GB – A. J. Hawk & Nick Barnett (10)

Coming off their win over the 49ers, the Packers flew to Ford Field for a Week 12 Thanksgiving duel with their NFC North rival, the Detroit Lions. Green Bay would trail in the first quarter as wide receiver Jordy Nelson fumbled on the game's opening kickoff, which allowed Lions quarterback Matthew Stafford to find wide receiver Calvin Johnson. The Packers would answer in the second quarter as quarterback Aaron Rodgers completed a 7-yard touchdown pass to tight end Donald Lee, followed by kicker Mason Crosby booting a 20-yard and a 25-yard field goal.

In the third quarter, Green Bay would add onto their lead as Rodgers hooked up with wide receiver Donald Driver on a 7-yard touchdown pass, followed by wide receiver James Jones on a 21-yard touchdown pass. Detroit tried to come back in the fourth quarter as safety Louis Delmas tackled running back Ryan Grant in his own endzone for a safety, followed by kicker Jason Hanson nailing a 22-yard field goal. Fortunately, the Packers would pull away as cornerback Charles Woodson returned an interception 38 yards for a touchdown.

With the win, Green Bay improved to 7–4.

Donald Driver (7 receptions, 142 yards, 1 TD) was named Fox's winner of the 2009 Galloping Gobbler Award.

=== Week 13: vs. Baltimore Ravens ===
Week Thirteen: Baltimore Ravens at Green Bay Packers – Game summary

- Game time: 8:30 pm EST/7:30 pm CST
- Game weather: 21 °F (−6 °C), Mostly clear
- Game attendance: 70,286 at Lambeau Field, Green Bay, Wisconsin
- Referee: Walt Anderson
- TV announcers (ESPN): Mike Tirico, Ron Jaworski, Jon Gruden & Michele Tafoya

After the win over the Lions, The Packers are back at home for a week 13 Monday night duel with the Baltimore Ravens. First quarter

- GB – 8:39 – Mason Crosby 28 field goal (GB 3–0)

Second quarter

- GB – 4:35 – 2-yard TD pass from Aaron Rodgers to Jermichael Finley (Crosby kick) (GB 10–0)
- GB – 0:32 – 8-yard TD pass from Aaron Rodgers to Donald Driver (Crosby kick) (GB 17–0)

Third quarter

- BAL – 3:28 – 12-yard TD pass from Joe Flacco to Kelley Washington (Cundiff kick) (GB 17–7)
- BAL – 2:58 – Willis McGahee 1-yard TD run (Cundiff kick) (GB 17–14)

Fourth quarter

- GB – 10:31 – 19-yard TD pass from Aaron Rodgers to Jermichael Finley (Crosby kick) (GB 24–14)
- GB – 2:00 – Mason Crosby 32 field goal (GB 27–14)

With the win, the Packers increased to 8–4.

	1	2	3	4	Total
Ravens	0	0	14	0	14
Packers	3	14	0	10	27

Top passers

- BAL – Joe Flacco – 15/36, 137 yards, 1 TD, 3 INT
- GB – Aaron Rodgers – 26/40, 263 yards, 3 TD, 2 INT

Top rushers

- BAL – Ray Rice – 14 carries, 54 yards
- GB – Ryan Grant – 18 carries, 41 yards

Top receivers

- BAL – Todd Heap – 5 receptions, 52 yards
- GB – Jermichael Finley – 7 receptions, 79 yards, 2 TD

Top tacklers

- BAL – Ray Lewis (7)
- GB – Clay Matthews (6)

=== Week 14: at Chicago Bears ===
Week Fourteen: Green Bay Packers at Chicago Bears – Game summary

- Game time: 1:00 pm EST/12:00 pm CST
- Game weather: 38 °F (3 °C), Cloudy
- TV announcers (Fox): Thom Brennaman & Brian Billick
- Game attendance: 62,214 at Soldier Field, Chicago, Illinois
- Referee: Mike Carey

First quarter

- GB – 13:23 – Ryan Grant 62-yard TD run (Crosby kick) (GB 7–0)
- GB – 3:40 – Mason Crosby 33-yard FG (GB 10–0)

Second quarter

- GB – 13:07 – Mason Crosby 26-yard FG (GB 13–0)
- CHI – 1:54 – 19-yard TD pass from Jay Cutler to Johnny Knox (Gould kick) (GB 13–7)

Third quarter

- CHI – 9:41 – 10-yard TD pass from Jay Cutler to Devin Aromashodu (Gould kick) (CHI 14–13)

Fourth quarter

- GB – 12:42 – Ryan Grant 1-yard TD run (Rodgers-Jennings pass) (GB 21–14)

	1	2	3	4	Total
Packers	10	3	0	8	21
Bears	0	7	7	0	14

Top passers

- GB – Aaron Rodgers – 16/24, 180 yards
- CHI – Jay Cutler – 23/36, 209 yards, 2 TD, 2 INT

Top rushers

- GB – Ryan Grant – 20 carries, 137 yards, 2 TD
- CHI – Matt Forte – 12 carries, 51 yards

Top receivers

- GB – Greg Jennings – 3 receptions, 56 yards
- CHI – Johnny Knox – 5 receptions, 83 yards, 1 TD

Top tacklers

- GB – Atari Bigby (7)
- CHI – Hunter Hillenmeyer (6)

=== Week 15: at Pittsburgh Steelers ===
Week Fifteen: Green Bay Packers at Pittsburgh Steelers – Game summary

- Game time: 4:15 pm EST/3:15 pm CST
- Game weather: 30 °F (−1 °C), Cloudy
- TV announcers (Fox): Joe Buck, Troy Aikman & Pam Oliver
- Game attendance: 57,452 at Heinz Field, Pittsburgh, Pennsylvania
- Referee: John Parry

First quarter

- PIT – 14:28 – Ben Roethlisberger pass deep right to Mike Wallace for 60 yards, TD. Extra point converted. (PIT 7–0)
- GB – 10:08 – Aaron Rodgers pass deep middle to Greg Jennings for 83 yards, TD. Extra point converted. (GB 7–7)
- PIT – 3:53 – Rashard Mendenhall right guard for 2 yards, TD. Extra point converted. (PIT 14–7)

Second quarter

- GB – 3:10 – Aaron Rodgers scrambles left guard for 14 yards, TD. Extra point converted (GB 14–14)
- PIT – 0:30 – Ben Roethlisberger pass short left to Mewelde Moore for 10 yards, TD. Extra point converted (PIT 21–14)

Third quarter

- PIT – 10:48 – Jeff Reed 37-yard field goal is GOOD. (PIT 24–14)

Fourth quarter

- GB – 13:25 – Aaron Rodgers pass short left to Jermichael Finley for 11 yards, TD. Extra point converted. (GB 24–21)
- PIT – 9:49 – Jeff Reed 34-yard field goal is GOOD. (PIT 27–21)
- GB – 7:58 – Ryan Grant left guard for 24 yards, TD. Extra point converted. (GB 28–27)
- PIT – 4:03 – Jeff Reed 43-yard field goal is GOOD. (PIT 30–28)
- GB – 2:12 – Aaron Rodgers pass short right to James Jones for 24 yards, TD. 2 Point conversion succeeded. (GB 36–30)
- PIT – 0:03 – Ben Roethlisberger pass deep left to Mike Wallace for 19 yards, TD. Extra point converted. (PIT 37–36)

	1	2	3	4	Total
Packers	7	7	0	22	36
Steelers	14	7	3	13	37

Top passers

- GB – Aaron Rodgers – 26/48, 383 yards, 3 TD
- PIT – Ben Roethlisberger – 29/46, 503 yards, 3 TD

Top rushers

- GB – Ryan Grant – 8 carries, 37 yards, 1 TD
- PIT – Rashard Mendenhall – 11 carries, 38 yards, 1 TD

Top receivers

- GB – Greg Jennings – 5 receptions, 118 yards, 1 TD
- PIT – Mike Wallace – 2 receptions, 79 yards, 2 TD

Top tacklers

- GB – Nick Barnett (8)
- PIT – William Gay (6)

During the 37–36 win, Pittsburgh's Ben Roethlisberger threw for 503 passing yards. In doing so he became just the 10th quarterback since 1950 to throw for 500 or more yards in a game and the first Steeler to do so.

=== Week 16: vs. Seattle Seahawks ===
Week Sixteen: Seattle Seahawks at Green Bay Packers – Game summary

Quarter	1	2	3	4	Total
Seahawks	0	3	0	7	10
Packers	14	10	14	10	48

at Lambeau Field, Green Bay, Wisconsin

- Date: December 27
- Game time: 12:02pm local
- Game weather: partly cloudy, 18 °F (−8 °C), 96% humidity, wind SW 5 miles per hour (8.0 km/h)
- Game attendance: 70,429
- Referee: Walt Coleman
- TV announcers (Fox): Thom Brennaman & Brian Billick
- Gamecenter, Gamebook

Game information

First quarter

- GB – Brandon Jackson 13-yard pass from Aaron Rodgers (Mason Crosby kick), 6:34. Packers 7–0. Drive: 4 plays, 35 yards, 2:16.
- GB – Ryan Grant 3-yard run (Mason Crosby kick), 0:23. Packers 14–0. Drive: 5 plays, 73 yards, 2:15.

Second quarter

- SEA – Olindo Mare 28-yard field goal, 7:12. Packers 14–3. Drive: 9 plays, 53 yards, 3:53.
- GB – Ryan Grant 56-yard run (Mason Crosby kick), 5:36. Packers 21–3. Drive: 4 plays, 67 yards, 1:36.
- GB – Mason Crosby 29-yard field goal, 0:00. Packers 24–3. Drive: 10 plays, 69 yards, 4:37.

Third quarter

- GB – Brandon Jackson 6-yard run (Mason Crosby kick), 10:13. Packers 31–3. Drive: 7 plays, 47 yards, 3:54.
- GB – Brandon Jackson 4-yard run (Mason Crosby kick), 5:27. Packers 38–3. Drive: 6 plays, 62 yards, 3:52.

Fourth quarter

- GB – Mason Crosby 52-yard field goal, 10:48. Packers 41–3. Drive: 9 plays, 37, 4:40.
- GB – Ahman Green 6-yard run (Mason Crosby kick), 6:39. Packers 48–3. Drive: 4 plays, 51 yards, 2:19.
- SEA – John Carlson 16-yard pass from Matt Hasselbeck (Olindo Mare kick), 4:15. Packers 48–10. Drive: 6 plays, 55 yards, 2:24.

Top passers

- SEA – Matt Hasselbeck: 19/37, 198 yds, 1 TD, 4 INT
- GB – Aaron Rodgers: 12/23, 237 yds, 1 TD

Top rushers

- SEA – Justin Forsett: 14 car, 70 yds
- GB – Ryan Grant: 16 car, 97 yds, 2 TD

Top receivers

- SEA – Deion Branch: 5 rec, 53 yds
- GB – Greg Jennings: 4 rec, 111 yds

Team – pass – rush – total – to

- SEA – 176 – 115 – 291 – 4
- GB – 264 – 153 – 417 – 0

The 38-point margin is currently the Packers' largest win over the Seahawks. With the blowout win, the Packers improved to 10–5 and, with the Carolina Panthers beating the New York Giants later that day, they clinched a playoff berth, while dropping Seattle to 5–10.

=== Week 17: at Arizona Cardinals ===
Week Seventeen: Green Bay Packers at Arizona Cardinals – Game summary

- Game time: 4:15 pm EST/3:15 pm CST
- Game weather: None (Domed Stadium)
- TV announcers (Fox): Sam Rosen & Tim Ryan
- Game attendance: 67,597 at University of Phoenix Stadium, Glendale, Arizona
- Referee: Carl Cheffers

First quarter

- GB – 8:49 – Ryan Grant 1-yard TD run (Crosby kick) (GB 7–0)
- GB – 2:43 – Aaron Rodgers 1-yard TD run (Crosby kick) (GB 14–0)

Second quarter

- GB – 12:40 – Safety: Penalty on Reggie Wells, enforced in end zone (GB 16–0)
- GB – 6:37 – Mason Crosby 26-yard FG (GB 19–0)
- GB – 4:44 – Charles Woodson 45-yard interception return (Crosby kick) (GB 26–0)

Third quarter

- GB – 4:21 – 5-yard TD pass from Aaron Rodgers to Jermichael Finley (Crosby kick) (GB 33–0)

Fourth quarter

- ARI – 3:04 – 3-yard TD pass from Brian St. Pierre to Larry Fitzgerald (Rackers kick) (GB 33–7)

	1	2	3	4	Total
Packers	14	12	7	0	33
Cardinals	0	0	0	7	7

Top passers

- GB – Aaron Rodgers – 21/26, 235 yards, 1 TD
- ARI – Matt Leinart – 13/21, 96 yards, 2 INT

Top rushers

- GB – Ryan Grant – 11 carries, 51 yards, 1 TD
- ARI – Tim Hightower – 6 carries, 24 yards

Top receivers

- GB – Jermichael Finley – 4 receptions, 34 yards, 1 TD
- ARI – Larry Fitzgerald – 3 receptions, 17 yards, 1 TD

Top tacklers

- GB – A. J. Hawk (6)
- ARI – Hamza Abdullah (7)

== Playoffs ==
=== Schedule ===
Playoff Round	Date	Opponent (seed)	Result	Record	Game Site	NFL Recap	TV
Wild Card	January 10, 2010	at Arizona Cardinals (4)	L 45–51 (OT)	11–6	University of Phoenix Stadium		Fox

=== NFC Wildcard Round: at Arizona Cardinals ===
NFC Wild Card Round: Green Bay Packers at Arizona Cardinals – Game summary

- Game time: 4:30 pm EST/3:30 pm CST
- Game weather: None (Domed Stadium)
- TV announcers (FOX): Joe Buck (play-by-play), Troy Aikman (color commentator), Pam Oliver (sideline reporter), & Chris Myers (sideline reporter)
- Game attendance: 61,926
- Referee: Scott Green

First quarter

- ARI – 11:04 – Tim Hightower 1 yd TD run (Neil Rackers kick) (ARI 7–0)
- ARI – 9:16 – 50 yd TD pass from Kurt Warner to Early Doucet (Rackers kick) (ARI 14–0)
- ARI – 0:34 – Rackers 23 yd FG (ARI 17–0)

Second quarter

- GB – 6:52 – Aaron Rodgers 1 yd TD run (Mason Crosby kick) (ARI 17–7)
- ARI – 2:16 – 15 yd TD pass from Kurt Warner to Early Doucet (Rackers kick) (ARI 24–7)
- GB – 0:00 – Crosby 20 yd FG (ARI 24–10)

Third quarter

- ARI – 11:15 – 33 yd TD pass from Kurt Warner to Larry Fitzgerald (Rackers kick) (ARI 31–10)
- GB – 7:20 – 6 yd TD pass from Aaron Rodgers to Greg Jennings (Crosby kick) (ARI 31–17)
- GB – 4:07 – 10 yd TD pass from Aaron Rodgers to Jordy Nelson (Crosby kick) (ARI 31–24)
- ARI – 2:34 – 11 yd TD pass from Kurt Warner to Larry Fitzgerald (Rackers kick) (ARI 38–24)

Fourth quarter

- GB – 14:08 – 30 yd TD pass from Aaron Rodgers to James Jones (Crosby kick) (ARI 38–31)
- GB – 10:57 – John Kuhn 1 yd TD run (Crosby kick) (38–38)
- ARI – 4:55 – 17 yd TD pass from Kurt Warner to Steve Breaston (Rackers kick) (ARI 45–38)
- GB – 1:52 – 11 yd TD pass from Aaron Rodgers to Spencer Havner (Crosby kick) (45–45)

Overtime

- ARI – 13:42 – Karlos Dansby 17-yard fumble return (no try) (ARI 51–45)

	1	2	3	4	OT	Total
Packers	0	10	14	21	0	45
Cardinals	17	7	14	7	6	51

Top passers

- GB – Aaron Rodgers – 28/42, 422 yards, 4 TDs, 1 INT
- ARI – Kurt Warner – 29/33, 379 yards, 5 TDs

Top rushers

- GB – Ryan Grant – 11 carries, 65 yards
- ARI – Chris Wells – 14 carries, 91 yards

Top receivers

- GB – Greg Jennings – 8 receptions, 130 yards, 1 TD
- ARI – Steve Breaston – 7 receptions, 125 yards, 1 TD

Top tacklers

- GB – Nick Collins (9)
- ARI – Antrel Rolle (13)

Entering the playoffs as the NFC's No. 5 seed, the Packers began their postseason run at the University of Phoenix Stadium for the NFC Wild Card game against the No. 4 Arizona Cardinals, in a rematch of their Week 17 win.

Green Bay would trail in the first quarter as early turnovers led to the Cardinals getting a 1-yard touchdown run from running back Tim Hightower, followed by quarterback Kurt Warner finding wide receiver Early Doucet on a 15-yard touchdown pass. Arizona would add onto their lead with kicker Neil Rackers making a 23-yard field goal. The Packers would answer in the second quarter with a 1-yard touchdown run from quarterback Aaron Rodgers, but the Cardinals came right back with Warner's 15-yard touchdown pass to Doucet. Green Bay would close out the half with kicker Mason Crosby getting a 20-yard field goal.

Arizona would add onto their lead in the third quarter as Warner completed a 33-yard touchdown pass to wide receiver Larry Fitzgerald, yet the Packers continued to hang tough as Rodgers found wide receiver Greg Jennings on a 6-yard touchdown pass. Then, after a successful surprise onside kick, Green Bay continued to rally with Rodgers finding wide receiver Jordy Nelson on a 10-yard touchdown pass. However, the Cardinals continued to score with Warner's 11-yard touchdown pass to Fitzgerald. In the fourth quarter, the Packers would tie the game as Rodgers connected with wide receiver James Jones on a 30-yard touchdown pass, followed by fullback John Kuhn getting a 1-yard touchdown run. However, Arizona's offense answered with Warner's 17-yard touchdown pass to wide receiver Steve Breaston. Despite that, Green Bay would come up with another tie as Rodgers found tight end Spencer Havner on an 11-yard touchdown pass. However, despite Green Bay getting the ball to begin overtime, the Cardinals linebacker Karlos Dansby returned a fumble 17 yards for the game-ending touchdown. With the heart-crushing loss, the Packers closed out their season with an overall record of 11–6.

The game set numerous NFL postseason records. The 96 combined points scored by the Packers and Cardinals is the most in NFL postseason history, surpassing the previous mark of 95 (Eagles 58, Lions 37 in 1995). The two offenses combined for 1,024 yards (tied for third most in postseason history) and 62 first downs (Packers 32, Cardinals 30), breaking the record of 59 set in a 1981 divisional game between the Chargers and Dolphins.

== Regular season statistical leaders ==
	Player(s)	Value	NFL rank	NFC rank
Passing yards	Aaron Rodgers	4,434 Yards	4th	2nd
Passing touchdowns	Aaron Rodgers	30 TD	4th	3rd
Rushing yards	Ryan Grant	1,253 Yards	7th	3rd
Rushing touchdowns	Ryan Grant	11 TD	T-7th	2nd
Receiving yards	Greg Jennings	1,113 Yards	15th	6th
Receiving touchdowns	Donald Driver	6 TD	T-28th	T-16th
Points	Mason Crosby	129 Points	4th	3rd
Kickoff return yards	Jordy Nelson	575 Yards	25th	13th
Punt return yards	Tramon Williams	135 Yards	27th	14th
Tackles	Nick Barnett	105 Tackles	30th	15th
Sacks	Clay Matthews	10 Sacks	T-11th	8th
Interceptions	Charles Woodson	9 INT	T-1st	T-1st

Statistics are correct through Week 17.

== Statistical league rankings ==
- Total Offense (YPG): 6th
- Passing (YPG): 7th
- Rushing (YPG): 14th
- Points (PPG): 3rd
- Total Defense (YPG): 2nd
- Passing (YPG): 5th
- Rushing (YPG): 1st
- Points (PPG): 7th

League rankings are correct through Week 17.

== Awards and records ==
=== Awards ===
==== Weekly awards ====
- OLB Clay Matthews was voted Pepsi NFL Rookie Of The Week for games played October 18 – 19.
- OLB Clay Matthews was voted Pepsi NFL Rookie Of The Week for games played November 12 – 16.
- CB Charles Woodson was named NFC Defensive Player of the Week for games played November 12 – 16.
- CB Charles Woodson was named NFC Defensive Player of the Week for games played November 26 – 30.
- OLB Clay Matthews was named NFC Defensive Player of the Week for games played December 3 – 7.

==== Monthly awards ====
- CB Charles Woodson was named NFC Defensive Player of the Month for the month of September.
- QB Aaron Rodgers was named NFC Offensive Player of the Month for the month of October.
- CB Charles Woodson was named NFC Defensive Player of the Month for the month of November.
- CB Charles Woodson was named NFC Defensive Player of the Month for the month of December.

==== Annual awards ====
- CB Charles Woodson was awarded the 2009 NFL Defensive Player of the Year Award.
- WR Donald Driver was awarded the 2009 Galloping Gobbler award.
- RB Ryan Grant was selected as the running back for the 2009 USA Football/NFLPA "All-Fundamentals" Team.
- FS Nick Collins was voted Packers' Ed Block Courage Award winner.
- OG Daryn Colledge was named Packers' Walter Payton Man of the Year.
- Lambeau Field was named Sports Turf Managers Association Field of the Year.

== Records ==
=== Team ===
==== Game ====
- The 2009 Packers set the team record for Most points scored, playoff game with 45 points vs the Arizona Cardinals.
- The 2009 Packers set the team record for Most net yards, playoff game with 32 first downs vs the Arizona Cardinals.
- The 2009 Packers set the team record for Most net yards passing, playoff game with 493 yards vs the Arizona Cardinals.
- The 2009 Packers set the team record for Most first downs, playoff game with 32 first downs vs the Arizona Cardinals.
- The 2009 Packers tied the team record for Most touchdowns scored, playoff game with 6 touchdowns vs the Arizona Cardinals.
- The 2009 Packers tied the team record for Most touchdown passes, playoff game with 4 touchdowns vs the Arizona Cardinals.
- The 2009 Packers tied the team record for Most passes completed, playoff game with 28 completions vs the Arizona Cardinals.
- The 2009 Packers tied the team record for Most (one-point) points after TD, playoff game with 6 scored vs the Arizona Cardinals.
- The 2009 Packers set the team record for Most net yards allowed, playoff game with 531 yards allowed vs the Arizona Cardinals.
- The 2009 Packers set the team record for Most first downs allowed, playoff game with 30 first downs allowed vs the Arizona Cardinals.
- The 2009 Packers set the team record for Most opponent net yards passing, playoff game with 379 yards allowed vs the Arizona Cardinals.
- The 2009 Packers set the team record for Most opponent touchdown passes, playoff game with 5 touchdown passes allowed vs the Arizona Cardinals.
- The 2009 Packers set the team record for Most opponent points scored, playoff game with 51 points allowed vs the Arizona Cardinals.
- The 2009 Packers set the team record for Most opponent touchdowns scored, playoff game with 7 touchdowns allowed vs the Arizona Cardinals.
- The 2009 Packers tied the team record for Most opponent (one-point) points after TD, playoff game with 6 allowed vs the Arizona Cardinals.

==== Season ====
- The 2009 Packers were the first team in NFL history to have a 4,000+ yard passer, a 1,200+ yard rusher and two 1,000+ yard receivers. These milestones were surpassed by QB Aaron Rodgers, RB Ryan Grant, WR Greg Jennings and WR Donald Driver.

==== Misc ====
- The December 7 Baltimore Ravens vs. Green Bay Packers game on Monday Night Football set the Packers record for Most combined penalty yards, game with 310 combined total penalty yards. It also tied for the second-highest penalty yardage in one game in NFL history.

=== Individual ===
==== Game ====
- QB Aaron Rodgers passed Don Majkowski and Brett Favre for first place on the Most Attempts, No Interceptions, game list with 48 attempts vs the Pittsburgh Steelers.
- QB Aaron Rodgers passed Lynn Dickey for first place on the Most yards, passing, playoff game list with 422 yards vs the Arizona Cardinals.
- QB Aaron Rodgers tied Brett Favre for first place on the Most Completions, Passing, playoff game list with 28 completions vs the Arizona Cardinals.
- QB Aaron Rodgers tied Bart Starr and Lynn Dickey for first place on the Most touchdown passes, playoff game list with 4 touchdowns vs the Arizona Cardinals.
- TE Jermichael Finley passed John Jefferson for first place on the Most yards receiving, playoff game list with 159 yards vs the Arizona Cardinals.

==== Season ====
- QB Aaron Rodgers passed Brett Favre for 2nd place on the Most yards passing, season list with 4,434 yards.
- QB Aaron Rodgers passed Brett Favre for 2nd place on the Highest Passer Rating, season list with a rating of 103.2.
- QB Aaron Rodgers passed Don Majkowski for 1st place on the Most Time Sacked, season list with 50.
- QB Aaron Rodgers set the Packers record for Most games without an Interception, season record with 12 games.
- OLB Clay Matthews passed Tim Harris and Vonnie Holliday for first place on the Most sacks, rookie, season (1982–Present) record with 10.
- CB Charles Woodson tied Herb Adderley and Nick Collins for first place on the Most touchdowns on interceptions, season record with 3.

==== Career ====
- QB Aaron Rodgers became the first quarterback in NFL history to throw for 4,000+ yards in his first two years as a starter.
- QB Aaron Rodgers tied Don Majkowski for 3rd place on the Most games, 300 or more yards passing, career list with nine.
- WR Donald Driver passed Sterling Sharpe for 1st place on the Packers Receiving, most receptions, career list.
- WR Donald Driver passed Don Hutson and Sterling Sharpe for 2nd place on the Packers Receiving, most yards gained, career list.
- WR Donald Driver passed James Lofton and Sterling Sharpe for outright 1st place on the Packers Most seasons, 50 or more receptions list.
- WR Donald Driver became the ninth Packer in team history to pass the 50 career touchdowns mark scoring his 50th touchdown in the 2nd quarter vs the Baltimore Ravens.
- RB Ahman Green passed Jim Taylor for 1st place on the Packers Most rushing attempts, career list.
- RB Ahman Green passed Jim Taylor for 1st place on the Packers Most yards rushing, career list.
- LB Nick Barnett passed Brian Noble and Bernardo Harris for outright 1st place on the Packers Most seasons leading team (1975–2008) list with five seasons.
- CB Charles Woodson tied Herb Adderley for 1st place on the Packers Most touchdowns on interceptions, career list with seven.
- CB Charles Woodson passed Herb Adderley and Darren Sharper for outright 1st place on the Packers Most defensive touchdowns, career list with eight (7 Int., 1 FR).

=== 2010 Pro Bowl selections ===
The Packers 2010 Pro Bowl selections were announced on December 29 during a special NFL Total Access 2010 NFL Pro Bowl Selection Show on NFL Network. Aaron Rodgers is going to the pro bowl, along with Charles Woodson and Nick Collins. Rookie Clay Matthews was later added after Bears linebacker Lance Briggs dropped out because of an injury. After the NFC championship Aaron Rodgers was promoted to starter due to New Orleans Saints quarterback Drew Brees declining to participate in the Pro Bowl due to playing in the Super Bowl the following week and Brett Favre also declined to play due to injury.

Position	Player	Team
QB	Aaron Rodgers^{a}	Starter
OLB	Clay Matthews^{b}	Reserve
CB	Charles Woodson	Starter
FS	Nick Collins	Reserve

Notes:

- ^{a} : Selected as a reserve, but moved to starter due to Drew Brees and Brett Favre declining to take part in the contest.
- ^{b} : Replacement selection due to injury or vacancy.

=== 2009 All-Pro selections ===
The following is a list of players that were named to the Associated Press 2009 All-Pro Team.

Position	Player	Team
CB	Charles Woodson	First
S	Nick Collins	Second
