= Patrick Williams (wide receiver) =

American football player (born 1986)

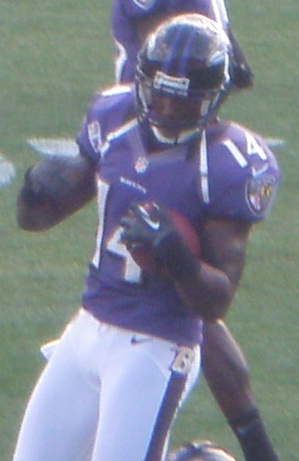
- Williams with the Baltimore Ravens in 2012

No. 19, 14
- Position: Wide receiver

Personal information
- Born: January 19, 1986 (age 40); Dallas, Texas, U.S.
- Listed height: 6 ft 1 in (1.85 m)
- Listed weight: 204 lb (93 kg)

Career information
- College: Colorado
- NFL draft: 2009: undrafted

Career history
- Green Bay Packers (2009); Seattle Seahawks (2010–2011)*; Baltimore Ravens (2011–2012)*
- * Offseason or practice squad member only
- Stats at Pro Football Reference

Patrick Darnell Williams (born January 19, 1986) is an American former professional football player who was a wide receiver in the National Football League (NFL). He was signed by the Green Bay Packers as an undrafted free agent in 2009. He played college football for the Colorado Buffaloes.

Williams was also a member of the Seattle Seahawks and Baltimore Ravens.

== Early life ==
Born in Dallas, Texas, Williams was an option quarterback as a prep and a three-year letterman at DeSoto High School (DeSoto, Texas) outside of Dallas. A two-time All-District 4-5A selection and his team's back-to-back offensive most valuable player who was also a captain for both his junior and senior seasons. He led his team to an 8–3 record his senior year when he amassed 506 yards rushing on 123 attempts, while passing for 215 yards and also returning eight punts for 108 yards and accounting for eight total touchdowns. He played six different positions during his high school career and was named the team's most valuable player following his junior season. He also participated in track, where he lettered three times, competing in the 4 x 100-meter relay, the 4 x 200-meter relay (winning the state championship in 2004), 110-meter hurdles, long jump, triple jump, and the high jump.

== College career ==
Williams was a four-year letter winner who appeared in 50 games during his collegiate career at Colorado. He started 20 games over the course of his four years and was voted a team captain by his teammates prior to his senior season in 2008. He finished his college career tied for eighth all-time in school history with former CU and current Denver Broncos tight end Daniel Graham in receptions with 106 and 17th in receiving yards with 1,099. He became one of only nine players to have ever totaled both 100 catches and 1,000 receiving yards for the Buffaloes.

He had his best statistical season as a senior in 2008 when he established career highs in catches (30), yards (322) and touchdowns (2). He played in all 13 games, starting five, as a junior in 2007, collecting 29 catches for 294 yards. He appeared in all 12 games in 2006 with seven starts, totaled 19 catches for 242 yards and one touchdown. He participated in all 13 games during his first season of full-time action in 2005, making 28 catches for 241 yards as a redshirt freshman. He received a medical redshirt in 2004 after playing in the season's first two games but breaking bones in both of his hands.

== Professional career ==
Pre-draft measurables
Height	Weight	40-yard dash	10-yard split	20-yard split	20-yard shuttle	Three-cone drill	Vertical jump	Broad jump
6 ft 1 5/8 in (1.87 m)	204 lb (93 kg)	4.52 s	1.54 s	2.61 s	4.19 s	6.93 s	38.0 in (0.97 m)	11 ft 0 in (3.35 m)
All values from Pro Day

=== Green Bay Packers ===
After going undrafted in the 2009 NFL draft, Williams was signed by the Green Bay Packers as an undrafted free agent. He waived/injured on August 14 and subsequently reverted to injured reserve. The Packers released him with an injury settlement on August 20.

Williams was re-signed to the Packers' practice squad on October 27, 2009. He was promoted to the active roster on December 15 after the team waived wide receiver Biren Ealy.

=== Seattle Seahawks ===
Williams was cut by the Packers during final cuts and was signed to the Seattle Seahawks practice squad in September 2010. Seattle signed him to a reserve/future contract in January 2011. He was waived on August 29, only to be re-signed two days later on August 31.

=== Baltimore Ravens ===
Williams was signed to the Ravens' practice squad on December 27, 2011 after offensive tackle D.J. Jones, who was promoted to the Ravens' 53 man roster after WR David Reed was placed on the injured reserve list.
