= Trevor Ford (American football) =

American football player (born 1986)

No. 39
- Position: Cornerback

Personal information
- Born: February 19, 1986 (age 40); Miami, Florida, U.S.
- Listed height: 6 ft 0 in (1.83 m)
- Listed weight: 188 lb (85 kg)

Career information
- High school: Miami Northwestern
- College: Troy
- NFL draft: 2009: undrafted

Career history
- Green Bay Packers (2009); Arizona Cardinals (2010)*; Hartford Colonials (2010)
- * Offseason or practice squad member only

Career NFL statistics
- Total tackles: 2
- Stats at Pro Football Reference

Trevor Demetrius Ford (born February 19, 1986) is an American former professional football player who was a cornerback in the National Football League (NFL). He was signed by the Green Bay Packers as an undrafted free agent in 2009. He played college football for the Troy Trojans.

Pre-draft measurables
| Height | Weight | 40-yard dash | 10-yard split | 20-yard split | Vertical jump |
|---|---|---|---|---|---|
| 5 ft 11 1/8 in (1.81 m) | 186 lb (84 kg) | 4.45 s | 1.53 s | 2.61 s | 37.0 in (0.94 m) |
All values from Pro Day
