= Cyril Obiozor =

American football player (born 1986)

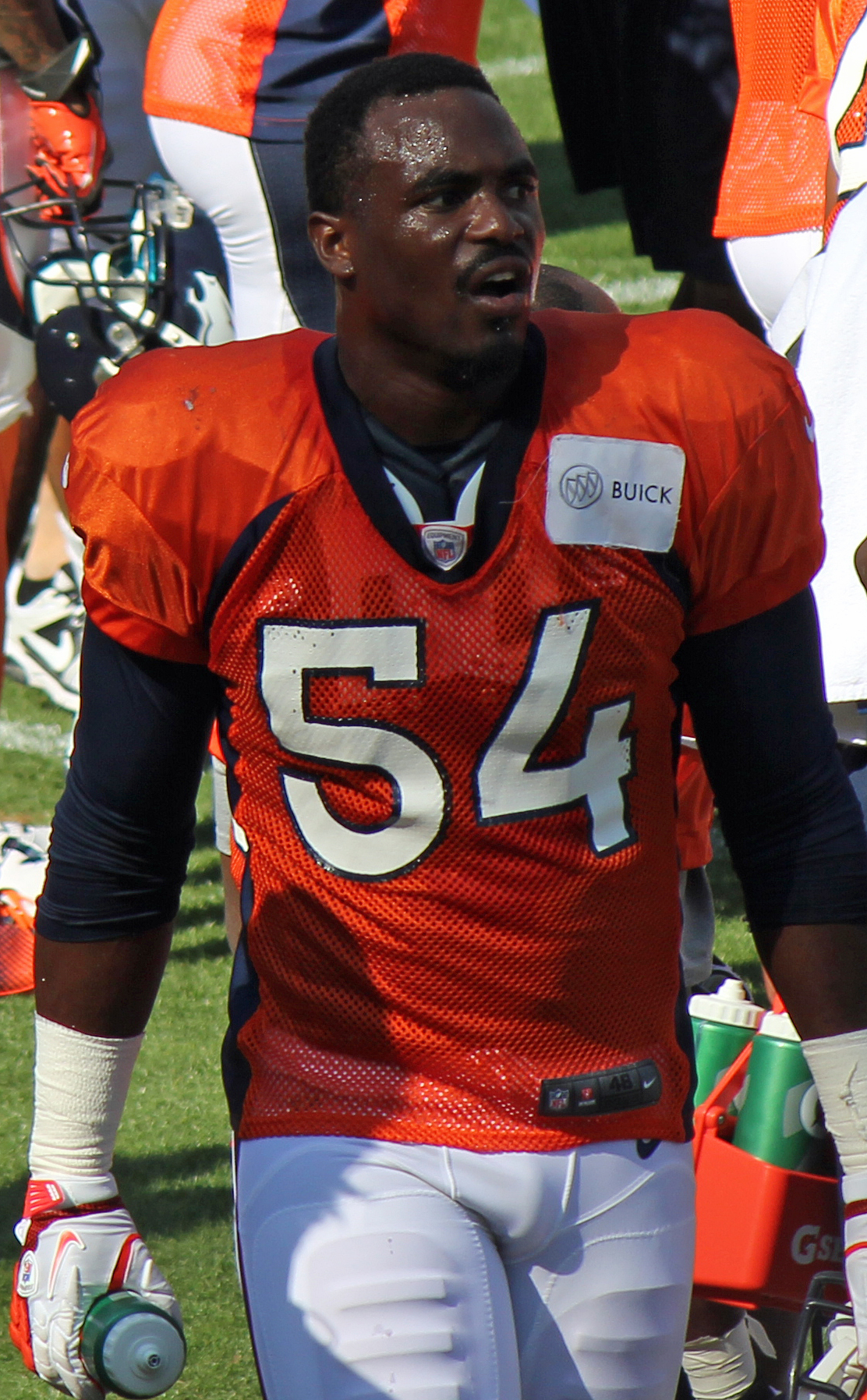
- Obiozor with the Denver Broncos in 2012

No. 49, 52, 54
- Position: Linebacker

Personal information
- Born: September 26, 1986 (age 40); Pearland, Texas, U.S.
- Listed height: 6 ft 4 in (1.93 m)
- Listed weight: 249 lb (113 kg)

Career information
- High school: Pearland
- College: Texas A&M
- NFL draft: 2009: undrafted

Career history
- Green Bay Packers (2009); Arizona Cardinals (2010); San Diego Chargers (2010); Arizona Cardinals (2010); Denver Broncos (2012)*
- * Offseason or practice squad member only
- Stats at Pro Football Reference

Cyril Obiozor // (born September 26, 1986) (/ˈoʊbəzɔːr/ OH-bə-zor) is an American former professional football player who was a linebacker in the National Football League (NFL). He was signed by the Green Bay Packers as an undrafted free agent in 2009. He played college football for the Texas A&M Aggies.

He also played for the Arizona Cardinals and San Diego Chargers.

== Professional career ==
=== Green Bay Packers ===
Obiozor signed with the Packers as an undrafted free agent in May 2009. He remained on the team's practice squad throughout the first 13 weeks of the 2009 regular season. After the team placed Aaron Kampman on injured reserve, Obiozor was moved to the active roster for the last five games. He made 2 total tackles in those five games.

=== Arizona Cardinals ===
On September 5, 2010, Obiozor was claimed off waivers by the Arizona Cardinals. He was waived on September 21 but re-signed to the practice squad two days later.

=== San Diego Chargers ===
On October 5, Obiozor was signed to the Chargers roster after Jyles Tucker went on injured reserve.

=== Arizona Cardinals (second stint) ===
He was released on September 2, 2011.
