= JaRon Harris =

American football player (born 1986)

No. 81
- Position: Wide receiver

Personal information
- Born: May 6, 1986 (age 40); Sioux Falls, South Dakota
- Listed height: 6 ft 0 in (1.83 m)
- Listed weight: 193 lb (88 kg)

Career information
- High school: Washington (Sioux Falls, South Dakota)
- College: South Dakota State
- NFL draft: 2009: undrafted

Career history
- Green Bay Packers (2009)*
- * Offseason or practice squad member only

JaRon Jacob Harris (born May 6, 1986) is an American former football wide receiver. He was signed by the Green Bay Packers as an undrafted free agent. He played college football at South Dakota State.

== Early life ==
Harris played only one year of high school football as a senior for Washington High School (Sioux Falls, South Dakota). He graduated at the end of the 2003-'04 school year.

== College career ==
Harris played football at South Dakota State University, as a wide receiver/kick returner. A three-year starter, he was awarded all-Conference honors since his sophomore campaign and named as an all America player 08-09 season. He led South Dakota State in receiving the 2007-'08 seasons posting 70 receptions, 966 yards, 11 touchdowns as a senior after 40 receptions, 644 yards and 7 touchdowns the prior year. He was also productive returning kicks throughout his college career. He finished up his college years of football with 145 receptions, 2,144 yards and 23 touchdowns.

== Professional career ==
=== Pre-draft ===
NFL Scouts from the Minnesota Vikings, Chicago Bears and Dallas Cowboys worked Harris at SDSU's pro day work out, in which he ran a 4.35 40-yard dash. Other interests from the Indianapolis Colts and Carolina Panthers had Harris flying out to attend some private work outs, where Harris ran a faster time. Harris expected a late round draft pick but during the later part of the seventh round of drafting Harris received calls from the Packers, Colts, New York Jets and Bears.

=== Green Bay Packers ===
Harris signed with the Green Bay Packers on May 1, 2009. He was waived on August 30.

== Personal ==
His father, Ron, was selected by the Minnesota Vikings in the 1978 NFL draft.
