= Dane Randolph =

American gridiron football player (born 1986)

No. 57
- Position: Offensive tackle

Personal information
- Born: September 4, 1986 (age 40)
- Listed height: 6 ft 5 in (1.96 m)
- Listed weight: 300 lb (136 kg)

Career information
- College: Maryland
- NFL draft: 2009: undrafted

Career history
- Green Bay Packers (2009)*; BC Lions (2010, 2012)
- * Offseason or practice squad member only

Dane Randolph (born September 4, 1986) is a former American offensive tackle who played for the BC Lions of the Canadian Football League. He was signed by the Green Bay Packers of the National Football League (NFL) on May 3, 2009, as an undrafted free agent but later released. He was then signed to their practice squad on September 23, 2009. He played college football for the Maryland Terrapins at the University of Maryland.

== Early life ==
At Wilde Lake High School, Columbia, Maryland, Randolph was a two-year starter who primarily played defensive end but also started at offensive guard as a senior. He finished his career with 157 tackles and 14 sacks in his two seasons and recorded 85 tackles, 10 TFLs, eight sacks and batted down five passes as a senior. He was a SuperPrep All-American and Mid-Atlantic region pick and a PrepStar All-American, a Second-team All-Met selection by the Baltimore Sun as a senior. He attended Sandalwood High School in Jacksonville, Fla. as a sophomore.

Randolph lived two years in the Queen Charlotte Islands in British Columbia. His mother worked for the United States Navy as a cryptologist in Masset.

== College career ==
Randolph played in 41 career games, including 24 starts, all at right tackle. As a Senior (2008): Played in all 13 games, starting seven at right tackle (the first six and the bowl game). He was one of eight Terps to earn Academic All-ACC honors. As a Junior in 2007 he started all 13 games at right tackle. The year before, as a Sophomore, he played in 11 of 13 games at offensive tackle with four starts right tackle. As a Redshirt Freshman in 2005 he saw action in four games as a reserve offensive lineman. He reshirted in 2004.

== Professional career ==
=== Pre-draft ===
Randolph ran a 4.9 40-yard dash and bench pressed 225 pounds 29 times at the 2009 University of Maryland Pro Day.

=== Green Bay Packers ===
Randolph was signed by the Green Bay Packers on May 3, 2009, as an undrafted free agent. He was waived on September 4, 2009. He was then later re-signed to the Packers practice squad on September 23, 2009.

=== BC Lions ===
On May 25, 2010, it was announced that Randolph had signed a contract with the BC Lions. He was released on June 24, 2011. He was re-signed by the Lions on June 15, 2012. He was released by the Lions on June 22, 2012.
