= Stanley Daniels (American football) =

American football player (born 1984)

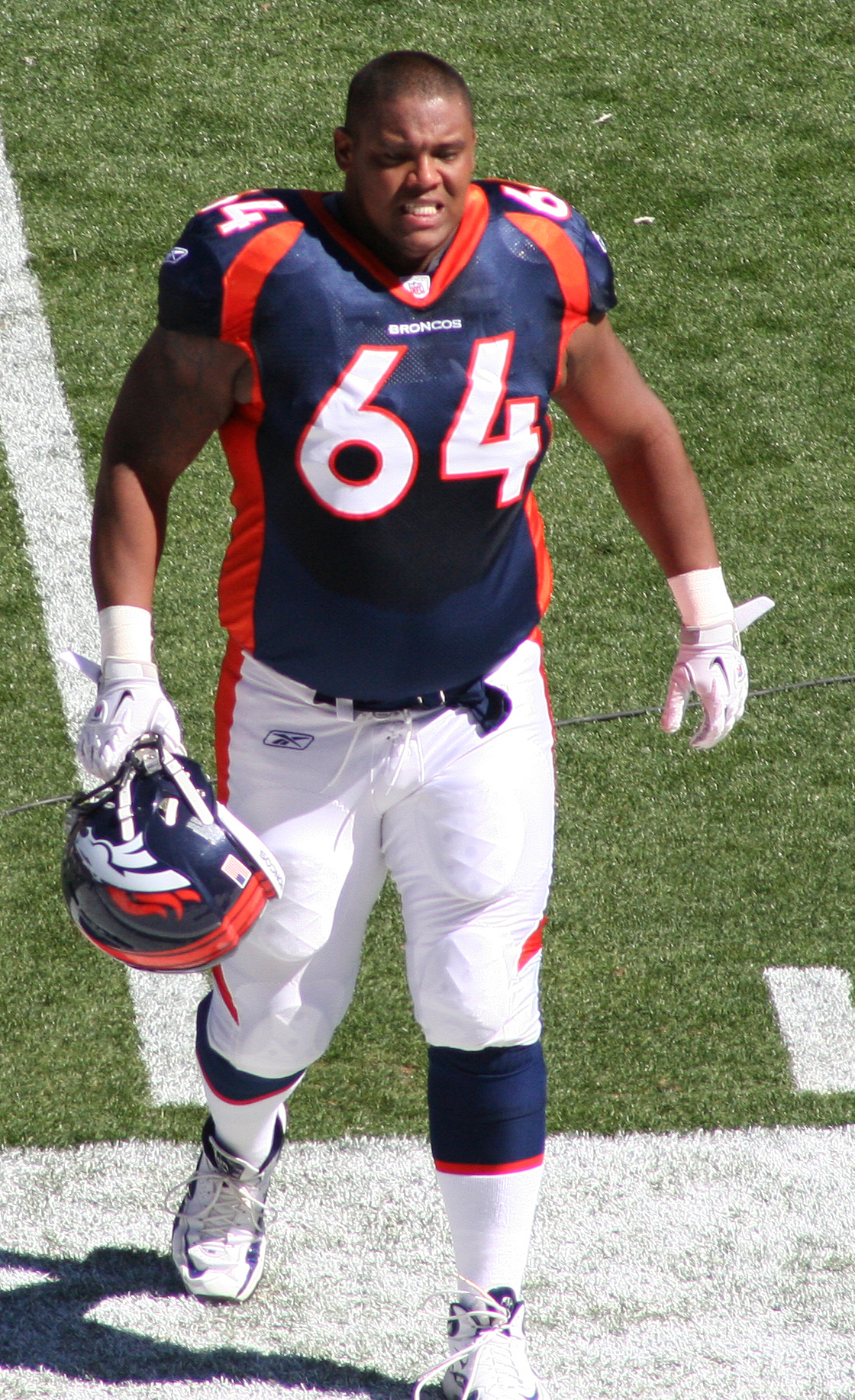
- Daniels with the Denver Broncos in 2010

No. 64
- Position: Guard

Personal information
- Born: November 30, 1984 (age 41); San Diego, California, U.S.
- Listed height: 6 ft 3 in (1.91 m)
- Listed weight: 328 lb (149 kg)

Career information
- High school: Marian Catholic (San Diego)
- College: Washington
- NFL draft: 2007: undrafted

Career history
- St. Louis Rams (2007)*; New York Jets (2007–2008)*; Green Bay Packers (2009–2010)*; Denver Broncos (2010); Cleveland Browns (2012)*; Portland Thunder (2014–2015)
- * Offseason or practice squad member only

Career NFL statistics
- Games played: 7
- Games started: 4
- Stats at Pro Football Reference

Career AFL statistics
- Receptions: 10
- Receiving yards: 116
- Receiving touchdowns: 4
- Stats at ArenaFan.com

Stanley E. Daniels, II (born November 30, 1984) is an American former professional football player who was a guard in the National Football League (NFL). He played college football for the Washington Huskies and was signed by the St. Louis Rams as an undrafted free agent in 2007.

Daniels was also a member of the New York Jets, Green Bay Packers, Denver Broncos, Cleveland Browns, ans Portland Thunder.

== Early life ==
Daniels prepped at Marian Catholic High School in San Diego.

== College career ==
Daniels played four years as an offensive lineman for Washington. He started 24 of 36 games.

== Professional career ==
=== St. Louis Rams ===
Signed with the St. Louis Rams' as a College Free Agent on May 1, 2007. Went through a portion of the Rams offseason conditioning program and unofficial and official mini-camps before being released on June 23, 2007.

=== New York Jets ===
Signed on August 13, 2007, with the New York Jets going through three days of their Training camp before being waived on August 16, 2007.

Signed a future contract with the Jets on January 9, 2008. He competed throughout the entire offseason, training camp, and pre-season before being waived on August 30, 2008. Signed the next day on September 1, 2008, to the Practice Squad where he competed for 10 days before being released on September 10. He was signed five days later on September 15 to the Practice Squad where he finished the season.

Completed the entire off-season, training camp, and pre season before being released before the beginning of the season on September 5, 2009.

=== Green Bay Packers ===
Signed with the Practice Squad on September 28, 2009, and competed on the team until October 27, 2009, when he was released. He later signed again to the Practice Squad on November 11 where competed for the remainder of the season.

Signed with the Packers to a future contract on January 11, 2010. He competed through the offseason activities before being released on May 12, 2010.

=== Denver Broncos ===
Claimed off of waivers on May 14 by the Broncos. Completed the remainder of the offseason, training camp, and pre-season making the active roster. Saw action and started the first four games at Left Guard. Was declared Inactive for five weeks (games 5, 10, 11, 12, 13). Saw action on Special Teams only in weeks 6, 7, and 8. Was waived on December 12. Signed to the practice squad on December 14 where he competed until December 22. He was signed on the 22nd to the active roster.

=== Portland Thunder ===
On February 4, 2014, he was assigned to the Portland Thunder of the Arena Football League.

== Personal life ==
Daniels' uncle, Ray May, was an NFL linebacker in the 1960s and 1970s.
