= Travis Dekker =

American football player (born 1985)

No. 48
- Position: Tight end

Personal information
- Born: October 21, 1985 (age 41)
- Listed height: 6 ft 4 in (1.93 m)
- Listed weight: 256 lb (116 kg)

Career information
- College: Air Force
- NFL draft: 2009: undrafted

Career history
- Green Bay Packers (2009)*
- * Offseason or practice squad member only

Travis Dekker (born October 21, 1985) is an American former football tight end. He was signed by the Green Bay Packers as an undrafted free agent in 2009. He played college football at Air Force. He did not play in the NFL, however, as he served his military commitment with the Air Force; the Packers released him off the reserve/retired list in 2015. After his military service, Dekker attended Georgetown University's medical school and is currently an orthopedic surgery resident at Duke University Hospital.
