= Spencer Havner =

American football player (born 1983)

No. 53, 41
- Positions: Linebacker, Tight end

Personal information
- Born: February 2, 1983 (age 43); Sacramento, California, U.S.
- Listed height: 6 ft 3 in (1.91 m)
- Listed weight: 250 lb (113 kg)

Career information
- High school: Nevada Union (Grass Valley, California)
- College: UCLA
- NFL draft: 2006: undrafted

Career history
- Washington Redskins (2006)*; Green Bay Packers (2006–2010); Detroit Lions (2010); Green Bay Packers (2010–2011)
- * Offseason or practice squad member only

Awards and highlights
- Super Bowl champion (XLV); Second-team All-American (2004); 2× Second-team All-Pac-10 (2004, 2005); SN Pac-10 Def. Freshman of the Year (2002); Freshman All-American (2002)

Career NFL statistics
- Total tackles: 29
- Receptions: 7
- Receiving yards: 112
- Receiving touchdowns: 4
- Stats at Pro Football Reference

Spencer Rhett Havner [HAY-vner] (February 2, 1983) is an American former professional football player who was a linebacker and tight end in the National Football League (NFL). He played college football for the UCLA Bruins. He was signed by the Washington Redskins as an undrafted free agent in 2006. Havner was also a member of the Green Bay Packers and Detroit Lions. He won Super Bowl XLV with the Packers over the Pittsburgh Steelers.

== Early life ==
Born in Sacramento, California, Havner earned two varsity letters as an inside linebacker and tight end at Nevada Union High School in Grass Valley, California. During his career, he made over 232 tackles, 18 sacks and 12 interceptions. In his senior year, he led Nevada Union High to a 12-1 record and a trip to the city title game. Havner earned second-team All-State from Cal-Hi Sports and was named to the All-CAL first-team and All-Metro first-team.

Havner also played basketball at Nevada Union all four years, and was a starter all the way through varsity.

== College career ==
After a redshirt freshman year, Havner became a four-year starter for UCLA. In 2002, he started 13 games and made 96 tackles with 2 sacks with 2 interceptions. In 2003, Havner started 12 of 13 games and had 82 tackles, 1 sack and 3 interceptions. As a junior in 2004, Havner earned First-team All-America acclaim from CBS Sportsline.com and College Football News and was selected Second-team All-America by the Walter Camp Football Foundation. He was one of 12 semifinalists for both the Butkus Award and the Rotary Lombardi Award. Havner missed the Pioneer PureVision Las Vegas Bowl after having arthroscopic knee surgery, but, in 11 games, he accounted for 125 tackles, 1 sack and 2 interceptions. In 2005, Havner led the team with 99 tackles and 3 interceptions and added 2 sacks. Havner led UCLA to a 10-2 record with a win in the 2005 Sun Bowl versus Northwestern, where he made 7 tackles and had 1 interception in a 50-38 victory.

== Professional career ==
=== Washington Redskins ===
Havner went undrafted in the 2006 NFL draft and was signed by the Washington Redskins and was assigned jersey number 51. He was released prior to the start of the 2006 NFL season.

=== Green Bay Packers (first stint) ===
During the middle of the 2006 NFL season, Havner was signed to the practice squad of the Green Bay Packers, but was released prior to the start of the 2008 season. The Packers re-signed him to their practice squad on October 15 and he was added to the active roster on December 4 after it was reported that the Chicago Bears were going to sign him to their active roster. During the 2009 offseason, Havner attempted to make the transition from linebacker to tight end, which was successful as he made the 2009 opening roster.

Against the Cleveland Browns on October 25, 2009, Havner scored his first career touchdown on a 45-yard reception from Aaron Rodgers. Havner scored his second and third career touchdowns just a week later, on November 1, on two touchdown passes from Rodgers against the Minnesota Vikings. He scored his fourth touchdown in 2009 against the Dallas Cowboys in week 10 on a four-yard touchdown pass from Aaron Rodgers. Havner scored again in a wild card playoff game against the Arizona Cardinals. In March 2010 Havner was arrested after crashing his motorcycle. Havner was released on September 4, 2010.

=== Detroit Lions ===
On September 5, 2010, Havner was claimed off waivers by the Detroit Lions. Havner was released on October 14, 2010 due to a hamstring injury.

=== Green Bay Packers (second stint) ===
On November 12, 2010, Havner was re-signed by the Packers after placing Mark Tauscher on injured reserve. He was waived on August 28, 2011.
