= Brandon Underwood =

American football player (born 1986)

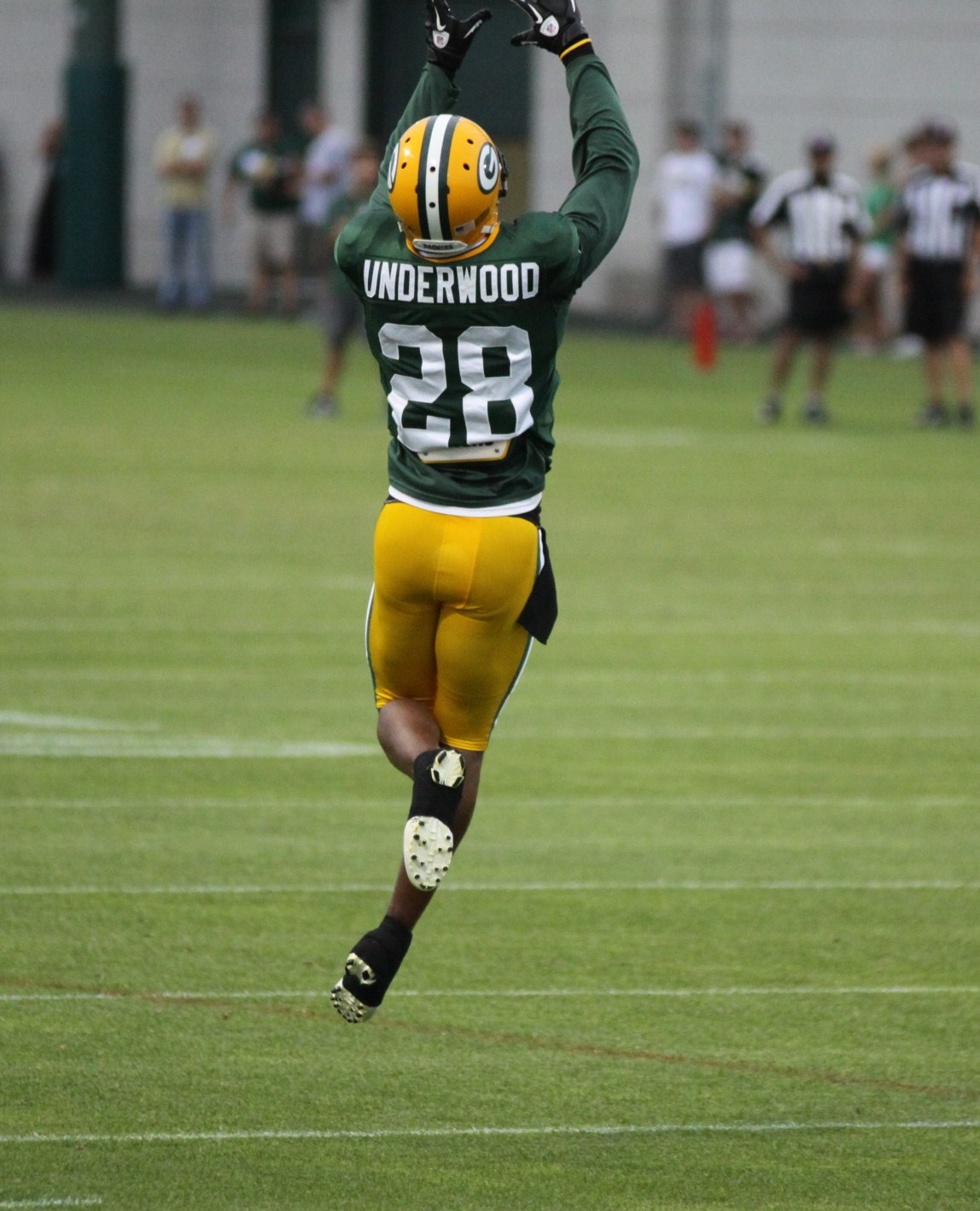
- Underwood with the Green Bay Packers in 2011

No. 33, 28
- Position: Safety

Personal information
- Born: June 24, 1986 (age 40); Cincinnati, Ohio, U.S.
- Listed height: 6 ft 1 in (1.85 m)
- Listed weight: 197 lb (89 kg)

Career information
- High school: Hamilton (OH)
- College: Cincinnati
- NFL draft: 2009: 6th round, 187th overall pick

Career history
- Green Bay Packers (2009–2010); Oakland Raiders (2012)*; Dallas Cowboys (2013)*; Toronto Argonauts (2014); Calgary Stampeders (2014)*; Toronto Argonauts (2015)
- * Offseason or practice squad member only

Awards and highlights
- Super Bowl champion (XLV); Grey Cup champion (2014); First-team All-Big East (2008)

Career NFL statistics
- Total tackles: 21
- Stats at Pro Football Reference

Brandon Dante Underwood (born June 24, 1986) is an American former professional football player who was a safety in the National Football League (NFL) and Canadian Football League (CFL). He played college football for the Cincinnati Bearcats and He was selected by the Green Bay Packers in the sixth round of the 2009 NFL draft. He was a member of their Super Bowl XLV championship team.

== College career ==
After going to Hamilton High School, Underwood spent his first two years at Ohio State, where he was redshirted as a freshman in 2005. He played in the season opener against Miami, recording three tackles before suffering a season-ending shoulder injury. After his sophomore season, Underwood transferred to Cincinnati, where he earned first-team All-Big East honors in his senior season, recording 4 interceptions including one of Heisman Trophy winner Sam Bradford.

== Professional career ==
=== Green Bay Packers ===
Underwood was selected in the sixth round (187th overall) of the 2009 NFL draft by the Packers.

He was released on September 3, 2011.

=== Oakland Raiders ===
On February 16, 2012, he signed with the Oakland Raiders. He was released by the Raiders on September 7, 2012 after landing on injured reserve.

=== Dallas Cowboys ===
On December 31, 2012, Underwood signed with the Dallas Cowboys. He was released by the Cowboys on August 27, 2013.

=== Toronto Argonauts ===
On January 9, 2014, Underwood signed with the Toronto Argonauts of the Canadian Football League. He was released by the Argonauts on August 31, 2014. On May 30, 2015, Underwood re-signed with the Toronto Argonauts. He was a free agent after the 2015 season.

=== Calgary Stampeders ===
Underwood was signed to the Calgary Stampeders practice roster on October 10, 2014.
