= Chris Pizzotti =

American football player (born 1986)

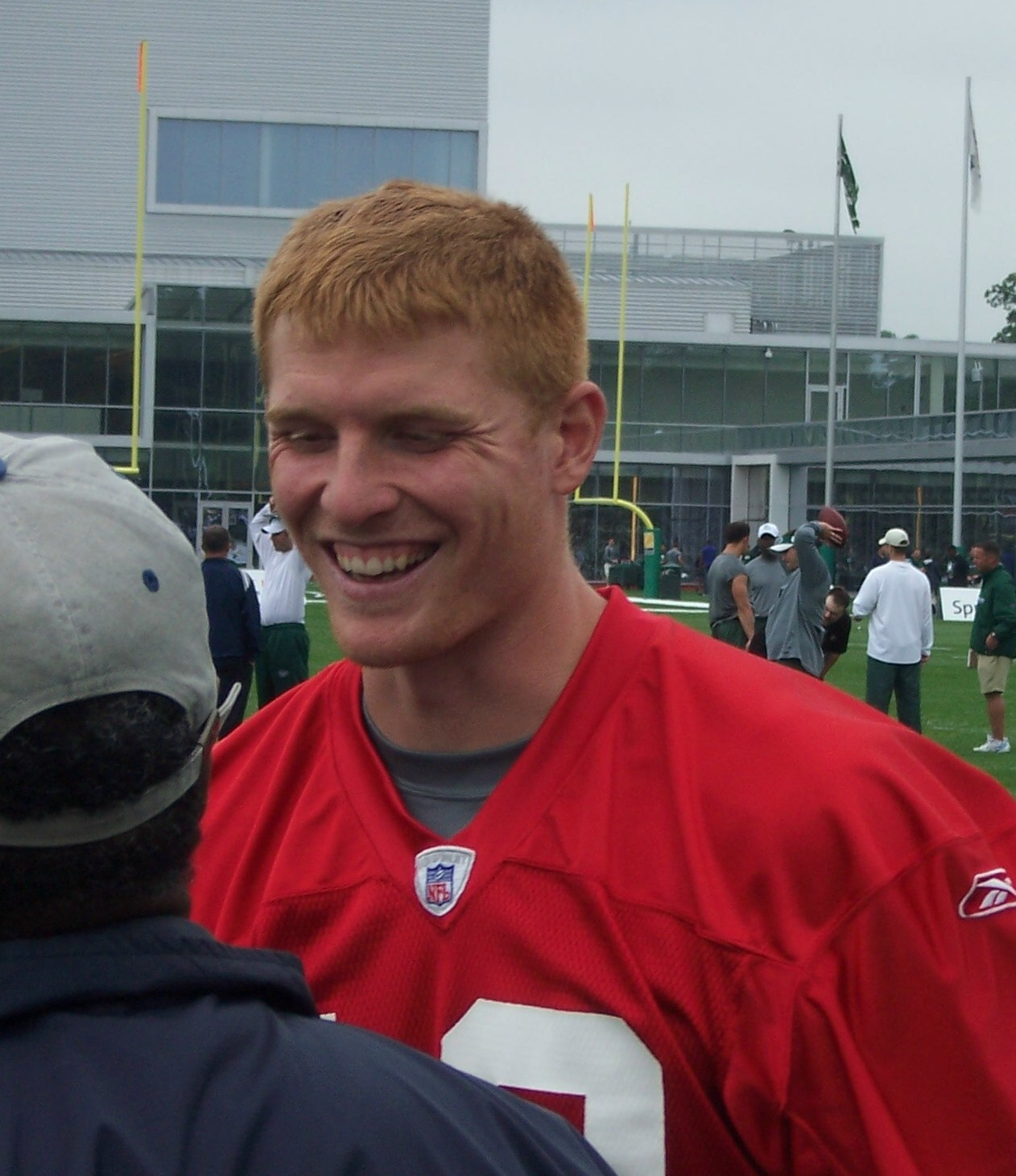
- Pizzotti at a June 2009 Jets mini-camp

No. 19
- Position: Quarterback

Personal information
- Born: June 29, 1986 (age 40); Reading, Massachusetts, US
- Listed height: 6 ft 5 in (1.96 m)
- Listed weight: 225 lb (102 kg)

Career information
- High school: Reading Memorial
- College: Harvard
- NFL draft: 2009: undrafted

Career history
- New York Jets (2009)*; Green Bay Packers (2009–2010)*
- * Offseason or practice squad member only

Awards and highlights
- 2× First-team All-Ivy League (2007–2008)

Chris Pizzotti (born June 29, 1986) is an American former professional football player who was a quarterback in the National Football League (NFL). He played college football for the Harvard Crimson and was signed by the New York Jets as an undrafted free agent in 2009. Pizzotti was also a member of the Green Bay Packers.

== Early life ==
Pizzotti attended Reading Memorial High School in Reading, Massachusetts.

== College career ==
Pizzotti attended Harvard University, where he majored in economics. He was selected first-team All-Ivy League in 2007 and 2008.

== Professional career ==
=== New York Jets ===
After going undrafted in the 2009 NFL draft, Pizzotti was signed by the New York Jets as an undrafted free agent on May 1, 2009. He was waived on August 15, 2009. He was re-signed on August 21, only to be waived again on August 30.

=== Green Bay Packers ===
On December 9, 2009, Pizzotti was signed to the Green Bay Packers practice squad after the team lost former practice squad quarterback Mike Reilly after Reilly was signed to the St. Louis Rams active roster. On January 11, 2010, Pizzotti was signed to reserve/future contract.

On May 20, 2010, the Packers released Pizzotti and signed Graham Harrell.
