= Jason Spitz =

American football player (born 1982)

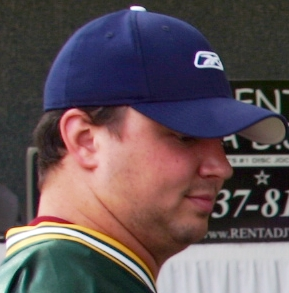
- Spitz with the Green Bay Packers in 2007

No. 67, 72
- Position: Center

Personal information
- Born: December 19, 1982 (age 43); Boardman, Ohio, U.S.
- Listed height: 6 ft 3 in (1.91 m)
- Listed weight: 298 lb (135 kg)

Career information
- High school: Bolles (Jacksonville, Florida)
- College: Louisville
- NFL draft: 2006: 3rd round, 75th overall pick

Career history
- Green Bay Packers (2006−2010); Jacksonville Jaguars (2011−2012); Seattle Seahawks (2013)

Awards and highlights
- Super Bowl champion (XLV)

Career NFL statistics
- Games played: 75
- Games started: 45
- Fumble recoveries: 1
- Stats at Pro Football Reference

Jason Spitz (born December 19, 1982) is an American former professional football player who was a center who last played in the National Football League (NFL). He was selected by the Green Bay Packers in the third round of the 2006 NFL draft. He won Super Bowl XLV with the Packers over the Pittsburgh Steelers. He played college football for the Louisville Cardinals. He was also a member of the Jacksonville Jaguars and Seattle Seahawks.

== Early life ==
Spitz attended Bolles High School in Jacksonville, Florida. He was a first-team All-First Coast selection as a two-way lineman. In his senior year he had 10 sacks and 56 total tackles in the year.

== College career ==
Spitz started all four years at Louisville, where he was a first-team All-Big East.

Spitz was originally meant to redshirt his freshman year in 2002 but was made the starting right guard during the game with Duke.

Spitz was part of a highly successful offensive line in 2003 that only allowed 13 sacks in 13 games and helped Louisville rank in the top 10 in rushing. He was appointed as a 2nd team All American All-Conference USA.

Spitz had a highly successful junior season in 2004 and started all 12 games at right guard. The Cardinal offense led Division I-A in total offense, scoring, and pass efficiency rating. He only allowed 2 1/2 sacks that season.

In his senior year in 2005, he was moved to left guard and helped the Cardinals once again rank in the top tenth in scoring, third in pass efficiency, and third in scoring. He allowed a career-low two sacks.

== Professional career ==
Pre-draft measurables
Height	Weight	Arm length	Hand span	40-yard dash	10-yard split	20-yard split	20-yard shuttle	Three-cone drill	Vertical jump	Broad jump	Bench press
6 ft 3 1/2 in (1.92 m)	313 lb (142 kg)	31 1/4 in (0.79 m)	9 1/2 in (0.24 m)	5.44 s	1.84 s	3.11 s	4.55 s	7.82 s	28.5 in (0.72 m)	8 ft 6 in (2.59 m)	25 reps
All values from NFL Combine

=== Green Bay Packers ===
Spitz was ranked the sixth best offensive guard in the NFL draft. He was taken in the third round (75th overall).

=== Jacksonville Jaguars ===
Spitz agreed to a multi-year deal with the Jacksonville Jaguars in 2011.

Spitz spent the entire 2012 season on injured reserve.

The Jaguars released Spitz on August 19, 2013.

=== Seattle Seahawks ===
Spitz signed a one-year deal with the Seahawks on September 25, 2013. He was released on October 12.
