= Biren Ealy =

American football player (born 1984)

No. 82, 19
- Position: Wide receiver

Personal information
- Born: July 7, 1984 (age 42); Clarksville, Tennessee, U.S.
- Listed height: 6 ft 3 in (1.91 m)
- Listed weight: 207 lb (94 kg)

Career information
- College: Houston
- NFL draft: 2007: undrafted

Career history
- Tennessee Titans (2007–2008); New Orleans Saints (2009)*; Baltimore Ravens (2009)*; Green Bay Packers (2009); Omaha Nighthawks (2010); Sacramento Mountain Lions (2010)
- * Offseason or practice squad member only

Career NFL statistics
- Receptions: 1
- Receiving yards: 6
- Stats at Pro Football Reference

Biren Synclare Ealy (born July 7, 1984) is an American former professional football player who was a wide receiver in the National Football League (NFL). He was signed by the Titans as an undrafted free agent in 2007. He played college football for the Houston Cougars and Arizona Wildcats.

Ealy was also a member of the New Orleans Saints, Baltimore Ravens, Green Bay Packers, Omaha Nighthawks and Sacramento Mountain Lions.
