= 2010 Green Bay Packers season =

Season in franchise history

- Owner: Green Bay Packers, Inc. (112,158 stockholders)
- General manager: Ted Thompson
- Head coach: Mike McCarthy
- Offensive coordinator: Joe Philbin
- Defensive coordinator: Dom Capers
- Home stadium: Lambeau Field

Results
- Record: 10–6
- Division place: 2nd NFC North
- Playoffs: Won Wild Card Playoffs (at Eagles) 21–16; Won Divisional Playoffs (at Falcons) 48–21; Won NFC Championship (at Bears) 21–14; Won Super Bowl XLV (vs. Steelers) 31–25
- All-Pros: 3: OLB Clay Matthews (1st team); CB Charles Woodson (2nd team); S Nick Collins (2nd team)
- Pro Bowlers: 7: Selected but did not participate due to participation in Super Bowl XLV: WR Greg Jennings; WR Donald Driver; OT Chad Clifton; OLB Clay Matthews; CB Charles Woodson; CB Tramon Williams; FS Nick Collins

Uniform
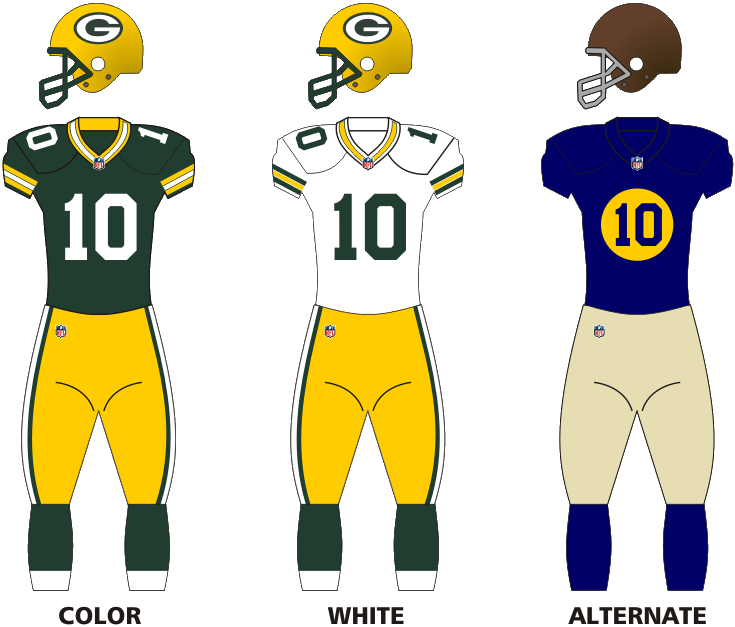

The 2010 season was the Green Bay Packers' 90th season in the National Football League (NFL), their 92nd overall, and their fifth under Mike McCarthy. Although they finished with only a respectable 10–6 record, good for a second place finish in the NFC North and a step back from their 11–5 record the previous season, the Packers never lost a game by more than four points, and never trailed by more than seven the entire season, becoming the only team since the AFL-NFL merger in 1970 to accomplish this. All six of their regular season losses were by a combined 20 points. Six of their ten wins were in multiple score games, giving them a record of 4-6 in one score games.

The Packers entered the playoffs as the NFC's sixth seed. After defeating the Philadelphia Eagles 21–16 in the wild card round, the NFC's top-seeded 13-3 Atlanta Falcons 48–21 in the Divisional round, and long time rivals Chicago Bears 21–14 in the NFC Championship, the team advanced to Super Bowl XLV in which they faced the AFC's 2nd seed Pittsburgh Steelers. The Packers defeated the Steelers 31–25 to win their fourth Super Bowl and 13th NFL championship. The Packers became the second overall team after the 2005 Pittsburgh Steelers, and the first NFC team, to win the Super Bowl as a sixth seed, as well as becoming the second NFC team to win three straight road playoff games (the 2007 New York Giants won three straight road games as a fifth seed). This is the last season the Packers have advanced to the Super Bowl.

The Packers offense ranked ninth in yards per game, tenth in total points and fifth in passing yards. The defense ranked fifth in yards allowed and finished second in points allowed (240), sacks (47), and interceptions (24), while also limiting quarterbacks to a 67.2 passer rating, first in the league. The 2010 Packers were listed 87th on the NFL's 100 Greatest Teams list in 2019.

== Offseason ==
=== Additions ===
- On March 9, former Indianapolis Colts WR Charles Dillon was signed to a contract.
- On March 16, former Australian Football League P Chris Bryan was signed to a contract.
- On April 26, S Charlie Peprah was signed to a contract.
- On May 20, QB Graham Harrell was signed to a contract.
- On August 5, WR Jason Chery was signed to a contract.
- On August 10, LB Maurice Simpkins was signed to a contract.
- On September 6, QB Graham Harrell, RB James Johnson, ILB Robert Francois, WR Chastin West, OT Chris Campbell, LB Maurice Simpkins, S Anthony Levine and OT Breno Giacomini were signed to practice squad a day after they were all cut from the active roster and cleared waivers.

=== Departures ===
- On May 12, G Stanley Daniels was released.
- On March 5, S Matt Giordano and DE Michael Montgomery were released.
- On March 7, the Jacksonville Jaguars signed DE Aaron Kampman to a contract.
- On April 26, LB Jeremy Thompson was released.
- On April 26, TE Devin Frischknecht was released.
- On May 20, QB Chris Pizzotti was released.
- On June 18, CB Trevor Ford, S Khalil Jones, LB Tim Knicky and QB Noah Shepard were released.
- On July 30, LB John Russell was released.
- On August 28, WR Shawn Gore was released.
- On September 4, LB Maurice Simpkins, DE Ronald Talley, NT Anthony Toribio, WR Chastin West, WR Patrick Williams, DE Jarius Wynn, P Chris Bryan, OT Chris Campbell, WR Jason Chery, CB D. J. Clark, C Evan Dietrich-Smith, WR Charles Dillon, ILB Robert Francois, OT Breno Giacomini, QB Graham Harrell, TE Spencer Havner, ILB Alex Joseph, S Anthony Levine, RB Kregg Lumpkin and OLB Cyril Obiozor were all released.

=== Suspensions ===
- On July 16, The NFL indefinitely suspended DE Johnny Jolly due to his July 8, 2008 second degree felony charge for possession of at least 200 grams of codeine. He would eventually be reinstated on February 27, 2013, and go on to play another season for the Packers.

=== Training camp and preseason injuries ===
- On July 30, Aleric Mullins was placed on the reserve/did not report list.
- On August 5, WR Jeff Moturi was placed on injured reserve.
- On August 10, CB Josh Bell was placed on injured reserve.
- On August 31, S Atari Bigby, CB Al Harris and RB James Starks were all placed on the reserve/physically unable to perform list. RB Quinn Porter was placed on injured reserve.
- On September 4, RT Allen Barbre and S Will Blackmon were placed on injured reserve.

=== Free agents ===
Position	Player	Free agency tag	Date signed	2010 team
RB	Ahman Green	UFA	July 29,	Omaha Nighthawks (UFL)
RB	DeShawn Wynn	RFA/UFA^{a}	August 23,	New Orleans Saints
FB	John Kuhn	RFA	April 15,	Green Bay Packers
FB	Spencer Havner	ERFA	April 2,	Green Bay Packers
G	Daryn Colledge	RFA	May 10,	Green Bay Packers
OT	Chad Clifton	UFA	March 6,	Green Bay Packers
OT	Mark Tauscher	UFA	March 15,	Green Bay Packers
C	Jason Spitz	RFA	April 5,	Green Bay Packers
DE	Johnny Jolly	RFA	June 15,	Green Bay Packers
NT	Ryan Pickett	UFA (FT)	March 12,	Green Bay Packers
OLB	Aaron Kampman	UFA	March 7,	Jacksonville Jaguars
CB	Will Blackmon	RFA	March 18,	Green Bay Packers
CB	Tramon Williams	RFA	June 17,	Green Bay Packers
SS	Atari Bigby	RFA	July 27,	Green Bay Packers
FS	Nick Collins	RFA	March 12,	Green Bay Packers
FS	Derrick Martin	RFA	February 22,	Green Bay Packers
P	Jeremy Kapinos	ERFA/UFA^{a}	December 7,	Pittsburgh Steelers
RFA: Restricted free agent, UFA: Unrestricted free agent, ERFA: Exclusive rights free agent, FT: Franchise Tag

Notes:

^{a} : Did not receive an exclusive rights/restricted free agent qualifying offer from the Packers and became an unrestricted free agent.

=== Coaching changes ===
- On January 29, Mark Lovat was promoted to strength and conditioning coordinator, with Dave Redding being demoted to assistant strength and conditioning coach from a result of the departure of Mondray Gee.

=== 2010 NFL draft ===
After finishing the 2009 season with an 11–5 record, the Packers held the 23rd selection in the 2010 NFL draft. With the pick they selected Offensive tackle Bryan Bulaga from Iowa.

On the second day of the draft, with pick 2–56 the Packers selected Defensive end Mike Neal from Purdue. The Packers then traded picks 3–86 and 4–122 to the Philadelphia Eagles for pick 3–71. With pick 3–71, the Packers selected Safety Morgan Burnett from Georgia Tech.

On the third and final day of the draft, with pick 5–154 the Packers selected Tight end Andrew Quarless from Penn State. With their compensatory selection pick 5–169, the Packers selected guard Marshall Newhouse from Texas Christian. In the sixth round with pick 6–193, the Packers selected Running back James Starks from Buffalo. Their final selection of the draft came when the Packers selected Defensive end C. J. Wilson of East Carolina with pick 7–230.

- The Packers were awarded a 5th round pick (5–169) for their loss of DT Colin Cole in the 2009 free agency period.

=== Draft pick trades ===
- During the 2010 NFL draft, The Packers traded picks 3–86 and 4–122 to the Philadelphia Eagles for pick 3–71.

2010 Green Bay Packers draft
Round	Pick	Player	Position	College	Notes
1	23	Bryan Bulaga	OT	Iowa	
2	56	Mike Neal	DE	Purdue	
3	71	Morgan Burnett	S	Georgia Tech	
5	154	Andrew Quarless	TE	Penn State	Pick acquired from PHI
5	169	Marshall Newhouse	OG	TCU	
6	193	James Starks	RB	Buffalo	
7	230	C.J. Wilson	DE	East Carolina	
Made roster † Pro Football Hall of Fame * Made at least one Pro Bowl during career

==== Undrafted free agents ====
Following the 2010 NFL draft, the Packers signed 11 undrafted free agents. They were:

- Quarterback, Noah Shepard (South Dakota)
- Wide receiver, Chastin West (Fresno State)
- Cornerback, Sam Shields (Miami)
- Running back, Quinn Porter (Stillman)
- Linebacker, Frank Zombo (Central Michigan)
- Linebacker, Alex Joseph (Temple)
- Linebacker, Tim Knicky (Stephen F. Austin)
- Linebacker, John Russell (Wake Forest)
- Guard, Nick McDonald (Grand Valley State)
- Offensive Tackle, Chris Campbell (Eastern Illinois)
- Wide receiver, Jeff Moturi (UTEP)

On May 3, the Packers signed wide receiver Shawn Gore, safety Anthony Levine and nose tackle Aleric Mullins after they attended a minicamp on a tryout basis.

== Coaching staff ==
2010 Green Bay Packers staff
Front office: Executive committee – Board of Directors; President/CEO – Mark Murphy; Executive vice president/general manager/director of football operations – Ted Thompson; Vice president of football administration/player finance – Russ Ball; Director of football operations – Reggie McKenzie; Director of college scouting – John Dorsey; Assistant director of college scouting – Shaun Herock; Assistant director of pro personnel – Eliot Wolf; Assistant director of pro personnel – Tim Terry; Head coaches: Head coach – Mike McCarthy; Assistant head coach/inside linebackers – Winston Moss; Offensive coaches: Offensive coordinator – Joe Philbin; Quarterbacks – Tom Clements; Running backs – Edgar Bennett; Wide receivers – Jimmy Robinson; Tight ends – Ben McAdoo; Offensive line – James Campen; Assistant offensive line – Jerry Fontenot; Offensive quality control – John Rushing	Defensive coaches: Defensive coordinator – Dom Capers; Defensive line – Mike Trgovac; Outside linebackers – Kevin Greene; Secondary – Cornerbacks – Joe Whitt Jr.; Secondary – Safeties – Darren Perry; Defensive quality control – Scott McCurley; Special teams coaches: Special teams coordinator – Shawn Slocum; Special teams assistant – Chad Morton; Strength and conditioning: Strength and conditioning coordinator – Mark Lovat; Assistant strength and conditioning – Dave Redding; Strength and conditioning assistant – Thadeus Jackson

== Final roster ==
2010 Green Bay Packers roster
Quarterbacks (QB): 10 Matt Flynn; 6 Graham Harrell; 12 Aaron Rodgers; Running backs (RB): 35 Korey Hall FB; 32 Brandon Jackson; 45 Quinn Johnson FB; 30 John Kuhn FB; 23 Dimitri Nance; 44 James Starks; Wide receivers (WR): 80 Donald Driver; 85 Greg Jennings; 89 James Jones; 87 Jordy Nelson; 16 Brett Swain; Tight ends (TE): 83 Tom Crabtree; 86 Donald Lee; 81 Andrew Quarless	Offensive linemen (OL): 75 Bryan Bulaga RT; 76 Chad Clifton LT; 73 Daryn Colledge G; 62 Evan Dietrich-Smith C; 70 T. J. Lang RT; 67 Nick McDonald C; 71 Josh Sitton G; 72 Jason Spitz G; 63 Scott Wells C; Defensive linemen (DL): 95 Howard Green NT; 77 Cullen Jenkins DE; 79 Ryan Pickett DE; 90 B. J. Raji NT; 98 C. J. Wilson DE; 94 Jarius Wynn DE	Linebackers (LB): 55 Desmond Bishop ILB; 53 Diyral Briggs OLB; 49 Robert Francois ILB; 50 A. J. Hawk ILB; 52 Clay Matthews OLB; 93 Erik Walden OLB; 57 Matt Wilhelm ILB; 58 Frank Zombo OLB; Defensive backs (DB): 20 Atari Bigby SS; 24 Jarrett Bush CB; 36 Nick Collins FS; 40 Josh Gordy CB; 22 Pat Lee CB; 26 Charlie Peprah SS; 37 Sam Shields CB; 28 Brandon Underwood CB; 38 Tramon Williams CB; 21 Charles Woodson CB; Special teams (ST): 2 Mason Crosby K; 61 Brett Goode LS; 8 Tim Masthay P	Practice squad: 64 Adrian Battles G; 69 Chris Campbell RT; 43 Michael Greco S; 48 Cardia Jackson ILB; 34 Anthony Levine S; 68 Jay Ross NT; 11 Chastin West WR; 60 Curtis Young OLB; Reserve: 56 Nick Barnett ILB (IR); 26 Josh Bell CB (IR); 42 Morgan Burnett SS (IR); 54 Brandon Chillar ILB (IR); 88 Jermichael Finley TE (IR); 25 Ryan Grant RB (IR); 91 Justin Harrell DE (IR); 41 Spencer Havner TE (IR); 97 Johnny Jolly DE (Susp.); 59 Brad Jones OLB (IR); 29 Derrick Martin FS (IR); 96 Mike Neal DE (IR); 74 Marshall Newhouse LT (IR); 51 Brady Poppinga OLB (IR); 27 Anthony Smith FS (IR); 65 Mark Tauscher RT (IR); Rookies in italics 53 active, 16 reserve, 8 practice squad

== Regular season ==
=== Regular season transactions ===
- On September 14, The Packers signed RB Dimitri Nance from the Atlanta Falcons practice squad and previously released DE Jarius Wynn. RB Ryan Grant and DE Justin Harrell were also placed on injured reserve.
- On September 15, The Packers signed CB Josh Gordy to their practice squad; LB Robert Francois released from practice squad.
- On September 23, The Packers signed LB Robert Francois to their practice squad; OT Chris Campbell released from practice squad.
- On September 29, The Packers signed OT Chris Campbell to practice squad.
- On October 7, The Packers signed LB Maurice Simpkins to the active roster from the practice squad, LB Johnny Williams was signed to the practice squad and S Morgan Burnett was placed on injured reserve due to a knee injury.
- On October 13, The Packers signed LB Robert Francois to the active roster from the practice squad, S Derrick Martin was placed on injured reserve, S Michaell Greco and LB Mike Rivera were both signed to the practice squad and LB Johnny Williams was released from the practice squad.
- On October 15, The Packers signed DE Michael Montgomery and placed LB Nick Barnett on injured reserve with a wrist injury.
- On October 18, The Packers traded a conditional draft pick in the 2011 NFL draft to the Jacksonville Jaguars for former 2009 preseason Packers safety Anthony Smith. TE Jermichael Finley was also placed on injured reserve with a knee injury.
- On October 20, The Packers signed NT Jay Ross to the practice squad and released RB James Johnson from the practice squad.
- On October 26, The Packers claimed ILB Diyral Briggs off waivers from the Denver Broncos, signed free agent LB Matt Wilhelm, placed DE Mike Neal and OLB Brady Poppinga on injured reserve and released ILB Maurice Simpkins.
- On October 27, The Packers signed OLB Erik Walden.
- On October 28, The Packers claimed NT Howard Green off waivers from the New York Jets and LB Brad Jones was placed on injured reserve with a shoulder injury.
- On November 2, The Packers released DE Michael Montgomery.
- On November 6, The Packers activated S Atari Bigby from the physically unable to perform list.
- On November 7, The Packers released 2x Pro Bowl CB Al Harris after being on the physically unable to perform list for the season.
- On November 9, The Packers activated RB James Starks from the physically unable to perform list and released LB Robert Francois.
- On November 12, The Packers signed TE Spencer Havner and placed Mark Tauscher on injured reserve.
- On November 15, The Packers signed ILB Robert Francois to the practice squad.
- On November 30, The Packers placed ILB Brandon Chillar and TE Spencer Havner on injured reserve.
- On December 1, The Packers promoted LB Robert Francois and CB Josh Gordy from the practice squad to the active roster and signed WR Terrance Smith and OLB Curtis Young to the practice squad.
- On December 18, The Packers promoted QB Graham Harrell from the practice squad to the active roster and put S Anthony Smith on injured reserve.
- On December 29, The Packers signed LB Cardia Jackson to the practice squad and released WR Terrance Smith.
- On December 31, The Packers signed C Evan Dietrich-Smith to the active roster and placed OT Marshall Newhouse on injured reserve.
- On January 20, The Packers signed WR Antonio Robinson to the practice squad and placed S Anthony Levine on practice squad/injured reserve.

=== Starters on offense ===
POS	Name	GS	Name	GS	Name	GS
QB	Aaron Rodgers	15+4 playoff	Matt Flynn	1		
RB	Brandon Jackson	15+1 playoff	James Starks	0+3 playoff	Ryan Grant (IR)	1
FB	Korey Hall	12	Quinn Johnson	4+4 playoff		
WR	Donald Driver	15+4 playoff	Jordy Nelson	1		
WR	Greg Jennings	16+4 playoff	James Jones			
TE	Andrew Quarless	9+4 playoff	Jermichael Finley (IR)	5	Donald Lee	2
LT	Chad Clifton	16+4 playoff				
LG	Daryn Colledge	16+4 playoff				
C	Scott Wells	16+4 playoff				
RG	Josh Sitton	16+4 playoff				
RT	Bryan Bulaga	12+4 playoff	Mark Tauscher (IR)	4		

=== Starters on defense and special teams ===
POS	Name	GS	Name	GS	Name	GS	Name	GS
LDE	Ryan Pickett	14+4 playoff	C. J. Wilson	2				
NT	B. J. Raji	16+4 playoff						
RDE	Cullen Jenkins	12+4 playoff	Howard Green	3	C. J. Wilson	1		
LOLB	Clay Matthews	15+4 playoff	Brady Poppinga (IR)	1				
MLB	Desmond Bishop	12+4 playoff	Nick Barnett (IR)	4				
MLB	A. J. Hawk	15+4 playoff	Brandon Chillar (IR)	1				
ROLB	Frank Zombo	7+1 playoff	Brad Jones (IR)	6	Erik Walden	2+3 playoff	Robert Francois	1
RCB	Tramon Williams	16+4 playoff						
LCB	Charles Woodson	16+4 playoff						
SS	Charlie Peprah	12+4 playoff	Morgan Burnett (IR)	4				
FS	Nick Collins	16+4 playoff						
K	Mason Crosby	16+4 playoff						
P	Tim Masthay	16+4 playoff						

== Schedule ==
=== Preseason ===
Week	Date	Opponent	Result	Record	Game site	NFL.com recap
1	August 14	Cleveland Browns	**L** 24–27	0–1	Lambeau Field	Recap
2	August 21	at Seattle Seahawks	**W** 27–24	1–1	Qwest Field	Recap
3	August 26	Indianapolis Colts	**W** 59–24	2–1	Lambeau Field	Recap
4	September 2	at Kansas City Chiefs	**L** 13–17	2–2	Arrowhead Stadium	Recap

=== Regular season ===
Week	Date	Opponent	Result	Record	Game site	NFL.com recap
1	September 12	at Philadelphia Eagles	**W** 27–20	1–0	Lincoln Financial Field	Recap
2	September 19	Buffalo Bills	**W** 34–7	2–0	Lambeau Field	Recap
3	September 27	at **Chicago Bears**	**L** 17–20	2–1	Soldier Field	Recap
4	October 3	**Detroit Lions**	**W** 28–26	3–1	Lambeau Field	Recap
5	October 10	at Washington Redskins	**L** 13–16 (OT)	3–2	FedExField	Recap
6	October 17	Miami Dolphins	**L** 20–23 (OT)	3–3	Lambeau Field	Recap
7	October 24	**Minnesota Vikings**	**W** 28–24	4–3	Lambeau Field	Recap
8	October 31	at New York Jets	**W** 9–0	5–3	New Meadowlands Stadium	Recap
9	November 7	Dallas Cowboys	**W** 45–7	6–3	Lambeau Field	Recap
10	Bye					
11	November 21	at **Minnesota Vikings**	**W** 31–3	7–3	Mall of America Field	Recap
12	November 28	at Atlanta Falcons	**L** 17–20	7–4	Georgia Dome	Recap
13	December 5	San Francisco 49ers	**W** 34–16	8–4	Lambeau Field	Recap
14	December 12	at **Detroit Lions**	**L** 3–7	8–5	Ford Field	Recap
15	December 19	at New England Patriots	**L** 27–31	8–6	Gillette Stadium	Recap
16	December 26	New York Giants	**W** 45–17	9–6	Lambeau Field	Recap
17	January 2, 2011	**Chicago Bears**	**W** 10–3	10–6	Lambeau Field	Recap

Note: Intra-division opponents are in bold text.

== Standings ==
NFC North
	W	L	T	PCT	DIV	CONF	PF	PA	STK
^{(2)} Chicago Bears	11	5	0	.688	5–1	8–4	334	286	L1
^{(6)} Green Bay Packers	10	6	0	.625	4–2	8–4	388	240	W2
Detroit Lions	6	10	0	.375	2–4	5–7	362	369	W4
Minnesota Vikings	6	10	0	.375	1–5	5–7	281	348	L1

== Regular season summary ==
=== Week 1 ===
Green Bay Packers at Philadelphia Eagles

Team	1	2	3	4	Total
• Packers	0	13	14	0	27
Eagles	3	0	7	10	20

- Date: September 12
- Location: Lincoln Financial Field, Philadelphia, Pennsylvania
- Game start: 4:15 p.m. EST
- Game attendance: 69,144
- Game weather: 69 °F (21 °C) (Cloudy)
- Referee: John Parry
- TV announcers (Fox): Joe Buck, Troy Aikman, and Pam Oliver

Scoring summary
Q1	4:23	PHI	David Akers 45-yard field goal	PHI 3–0
Q2	13:52	GB	Mason Crosby 49-yard field goal	Tie 3–3
Q2	1:48	GB	Donald Driver 6-yard pass from Aaron Rodgers (Mason Crosby kick)	GB 10–3
Q2	:00	GB	Mason Crosby 56-yard field goal	GB 13–3
Q3	8:36	GB	John Kuhn 3-yard run (Mason Crosby kick)	GB 20–3
Q3	4:24	PHI	LeSean McCoy 12-yard run (David Akers kick)	GB 20–10
Q3	1:56	GB	Greg Jennings 32-yard pass from Aaron Rodgers (Mason Crosby kick)	GB 27–10
Q4	10:23	PHI	Jeremy Maclin 17-yard pass from Michael Vick (David Akers kick)	GB 27–17
Q4	5:43	PHI	David Akers 24-yard field goal	GB 27–20

The Packers began their season at Lincoln Financial Field against the Philadelphia Eagles, who were wearing throwback uniforms commemorating the 50th anniversary of the team's victory over the Packers in the 1960 NFL Championship Game. Green Bay trailed in the first quarter as Eagles kicker David Akers made a 45-yard field goal. The Packers would then take control in the second quarter as kicker Mason Crosby nailed a 49-yard field goal, followed by quarterback Aaron Rodgers completing a 6-yard touchdown pass to wide receiver Donald Driver. Crosby would then end the half with a 56-yard field goal.

Eagles starting quarterback Kevin Kolb left the game with concussion at halftime, and was replaced by second-string quarterback Michael Vick for the remainder of the contest.

Philadelphia would respond in the third quarter as running back LeSean McCoy scored on a 12-yard touchdown run, yet Green Bay came right back with Rodgers finding wide receiver Greg Jennings on a 32-yard touchdown pass. The Eagles tried to rally in the fourth quarter as quarterback Michael Vick completed a 17-yard touchdown pass to wide receiver Jeremy Maclin, followed by a 24-yard field goal from Akers. Fortunately, the Packers' defense prevented any further progress stopping Michael Vick on a key 4th and 1 rush up the middle for no gain.

With the win, Green Bay not only began its season at 1–0, but also got its first victory in Philadelphia since 1962.

However, the Packers victory was not without cost. During the game, Justin Harrell injured his ACL and Ryan Grant injured his ankle. Both players were placed on injured reserve for the rest of the season.

=== Week 2 ===
Buffalo Bills at Green Bay Packers

Team	1	2	3	4	Total
Bills	0	7	0	0	7
• Packers	13	0	14	7	34

- Date: September 19
- Location: Lambeau Field, Green Bay, Wisconsin
- Game start: 1:00 p.m. EST
- Game attendance: 70,741
- Game weather: 58 °F (14 °C) (Partly Sunny)
- Referee: Ron Winter
- TV announcers (CBS): Spero Dedes and Randy Cross

Scoring summary
Q1	11:49	GB	Mason Crosby 44-yard field goal	GB 3–0
Q1	7:35	GB	Mason Crosby 24-yard field goal	GB 6–0
Q1	:11	GB	Brandon Jackson 1-yard run (Mason Crosby kick)	GB 13–0
Q2	10:49	BUF	Fred Jackson 3-yard run (Rian Lindell kick)	GB 13–7
Q3	8:32	GB	Donald Driver 7-yard pass from Aaron Rodgers (Mason Crosby kick)	GB 20–7
Q3	1:56	GB	Aaron Rodgers 9-yard run (Mason Crosby kick)	GB 27–7
Q4	11:41	GB	James Jones 30-yard pass from Aaron Rodgers (Mason Crosby kick)	GB 34–7

Hoping to continue their current winning streak, the Packers returned to Lambeau Field for their home opener, an inter conference duel with the Buffalo Bills. In the 1st quarter Green Bay took the early lead as kicker Mason Crosby made two field goals from 44 and 24 yards. RB Brandon Jackson added a touchdown on a 1-yard run. The Bills then answered in the 2nd quarter when RB Fred Jackson scored a touchdown on a 3-yard run. In the third quarter the Packers increased their lead when WR Donald Driver hauled in a 7-yard touchdown pass from QB Aaron Rodgers, followed by Rodgers scrambling 9 yards to the endzone for a touchdown. The Packers continued to dominate in the fourth quarter when Rodgers completed a 30-yard touchdown pass to WR James Jones.

With the win, Green Bay improved their record to 2–0 on the season tied with the Chicago Bears for the division lead. Both the Minnesota Vikings and Detroit Lions fell to 0–2. Linebacker Clay Matthews became the first Packer and one of only eight players in NFL history to record at least 6 sacks in the first two weeks of the season.

=== Week 3 ===
Green Bay Packers at Chicago Bears

Team	1	2	3	4	Total
Packers	7	3	0	7	17
• Bears	0	7	0	13	20

- Date: September 27
- Location: Soldier Field, Chicago, Illinois
- Game start: 8:30 p.m. EST
- Game attendance: 62,179
- Game weather: Mostly clear; 56 °F (13 °C)
- Referee: Terry McAulay
- TV announcers (ESPN): Mike Tirico, Ron Jaworski, Jon Gruden, Suzy Kolber, and Michele Tafoya

Scoring summary
Q1	4:26	GB	Greg Jennings 7-yard pass from Aaron Rodgers (Mason Crosby kick)	GB 7–0
Q2	4:41	GB	Mason Crosby 38-yard field goal	GB 10–0
Q2	:26	CHI	Greg Olsen 9-yard pass from Jay Cutler (Robbie Gould kick)	GB 10–7
Q4	14:39	CHI	Devin Hester 62-yard punt return (Robbie Gould kick)	CHI 14–10
Q4	6:52	GB	Aaron Rodgers 3-yard run (Mason Crosby kick)	GB 17–14
Q4	3:59	CHI	Robbie Gould 25-yard field goal	Tie 17–17
Q4	:04	CHI	Robbie Gould 19-yard field goal	CHI 20–17

Coming off their home win over the Bills, the Packers traveled to Soldier Field for a Week 3 Monday night duel with their hated divisional rival, the Chicago Bears. Green Bay would deliver the opening strike in the first quarter as quarterback Aaron Rodgers completed a 7-yard touchdown pass to wide receiver Greg Jennings. The Packers would add onto their lead in the second quarter as kicker Mason Crosby got a 38-yard field goal. Afterwards, the Bears would close out the half, as quarterback Jay Cutler found tight end Greg Olsen on a 9-yard touchdown run. After a scoreless third quarter, Chicago took the lead in the fourth quarter as wide receiver Devin Hester returned a punt 62 yards for a touchdown. Fortunately, Green Bay came right back with a 9-yard touchdown run from Rodgers. However, the Bears' Robbie Gould scored two field goals, from 25 and 19 yards, the final points being set up by a James Jones fumble, to win the game for Chicago.

The Packers committed a franchise record 18 penalties in the game.

With the loss, the Packers fell to 2–1.

=== Week 4 ===
Detroit Lions at Green Bay Packers

Team	1	2	3	4	Total
Lions	0	14	6	6	26
• Packers	7	14	7	0	28

- Date: October 3
- Location: Lambeau Field, Green Bay, Wisconsin
- Game start: 1:00 p.m. EST
- Game attendance: 70,729
- Game weather: Partly cloudy; 52 °F (11 °C)
- Referee: Mike Carey
- TV announcers (Fox): Thom Brennaman, Brian Billick, and Charissa Thompson

Scoring summary
Q1	12:40	GB	Donald Driver 29-yard pass from Aaron Rodgers (Mason Crosby kick)	GB 7–0
Q2	14:14	DET	Calvin Johnson 23-yard pass from Shaun Hill (Jason Hanson kick)	Tie 7–7
Q2	10:05	GB	Jermichael Finley 13-yard pass from Aaron Rodgers (Mason Crosby kick)	GB 14–7
Q2	6:48	GB	Greg Jennings 17-yard pass from Aaron Rodgers (Mason Crosby kick)	GB 21–7
Q2	:08	DET	Calvin Johnson 21-yard pass from Shaun Hill (Jason Hanson kick)	GB 21–14
Q3	14:34	GB	Charles Woodson 48-yard interception return (Mason Crosby kick)	GB 28–14
Q3	9:26	DET	Jason Hanson 39-yard field goal	GB 28–17
Q3	1:43	DET	Jason Hanson 52-yard field goal	GB 28–20
Q4	13:35	DET	Jason Hanson 49-yard field goal	GB 28–23
Q4	11:51	DET	Jason Hanson 24-yard field goal	GB 28–26

Hoping to rebound from their loss to the Bears, the Packers played on home ground for an NFC North rivalry match against the Lions. The Packers took the lead in the 1st quarter when QB Aaron Rodgers made a 29-yard TD pass to WR Donald Driver. The Lions replied in the 2nd quarter with QB Shaun Hill making a 23-yard TD pass to WR Calvin Johnson. The Packers started to rally with Rodgers making a 13-yard TD pass to TE Jermichael Finley and then a 17-yard TD pass to WR Greg Jennings. The Lions cut the lead as QB Shaun Hill made a 21-yard TD pass to WR Calvin Johnson. The Packers continued to progress in the 3rd quarter when CB Charles Woodson returned an interception 48 yards into the endzone for a touchdown. The Lions tried to cut the lead with four field goals by kicker Jason Hanson. He kicked a 39 and a 52-yard field goal for the rest of the 3rd quarter, and then a 49 and a 24-yard field goal in the fourth. However, the Packers defense never allowed the Lions to take the lead and the offense ran out the clock behind fullback John Kuhn.

With the close win, the Packers improve to 3–1.

=== Week 5 ===
Green Bay Packers at Washington Redskins

Team	1	2	3	4	OT	Total
Packers	7	3	3	0	0	13
• Redskins	0	3	0	10	3	16

- Date: October 10
- Location: FedExField, Landover, Maryland
- Game start: 1:00 p.m. EST
- Game attendance: 87,760
- Game weather: Sunny; 72 °F (22 °C)
- Referee: Gene Steratore
- TV announcers (Fox): Joe Buck, Troy Aikman, and Pam Oliver

Scoring summary
Q1	8:59	GB	Donald Driver 5-yard pass from Aaron Rodgers (Mason Crosby kick)	GB 7–0
Q2	7:30	GB	Mason Crosby 52-yard field goal	GB 10–0
Q2	:13	WSH	Graham Gano 26-yard field goal	GB 10–3
Q3	7:34	GB	Mason Crosby 36-yard field goal	GB 13–3
Q4	11:35	WSH	Anthony Armstrong 48-yard pass from Donovan McNabb (Graham Gano kick)	GB 13–10
Q4	1:07	WSH	Graham Gano 45-yard field goal	Tie 13–13
OT	8:06	WSH	Graham Gano 33-yard field goal	WSH 16–13

Coming off their win over the Lions the Packers flew to FedExField for an NFC duel with the Redskins. In the first quarter the Packers took the lead as QB Aaron Rodgers completed a 5-yard TD pass to TE Donald Lee. This was followed in the 2nd quarter by kicker Mason Crosby hitting a 52-yard field goal. The Redskins replied with kicker Graham Gano getting a 26-yard field goal. Then in the third quarter Crosby made a 36-yard field goal to put the Packers up 13–3. The Redskins rallied to tie the game with QB Donovan McNabb completing a 48-yard TD pass to WR Anthony Armstrong, followed by Gano making a 45 yard-field goal. At overtime, the decision was made when Gano successfully put away a 33-yard field goal to give the Packers their second loss of this season. Donovan McNabb would finish the game with 357 passing yards and run his career record against Green Bay to 6 wins and 1 loss.

With the loss, Green Bay fell to 3–2.

=== Week 6 ===
Miami Dolphins at Green Bay Packers

Team	1	2	3	4	OT	Total
• Dolphins	7	3	3	7	3	23
Packers	10	0	0	10	0	20

- Date: October 17
- Location: Lambeau Field, Green Bay, Wisconsin
- Game start: 1:00 p.m. EST
- Game weather: Sunny; 57 °F (14 °C)
- Referee: Ed Hochuli
- TV announcers (CBS): Ian Eagle and Dan Fouts

Scoring summary
Q1	11:58	GB	Mason Crosby 46-yard field goal	GB 3–0
Q1	6:52	MIA	Davone Bess 2-yard pass from Chad Henne (Dan Carpenter kick)	MIA 7–3
Q1	1:03	GB	Greg Jennings 86-yard pass from Aaron Rodgers (Mason Crosby kick)	GB 10–7
Q2	:20	MIA	Dan Carpenter 53-yard field goal	Tie 10–10
Q3	7:42	MIA	Dan Carpenter 41-yard field goal	MIA 13–10
Q4	10:45	GB	Mason Crosby 26-yard field goal	Tie 13–13
Q4	5:20	MIA	Anthony Fasano 22-yard pass from Chad Henne (Dan Carpenter kick)	MIA 20–13
Q4	:13	GB	Aaron Rodgers 1-yard run (Mason Crosby kick)	Tie 20–20
OT	9:01	MIA	Dan Carpenter 44-yard field goal	MIA 23–20

For the second consecutive week the Packers lost by an overtime field goal, falling to 3–3 on the season.

=== Week 7 ===
Week 7: Minnesota Vikings at Green Bay Packers – Game summary

Quarter	1	2	3	4	Total
Vikings	7	10	7	0	24
Packers	7	7	14	0	28

at Lambeau Field, Green Bay, Wisconsin

- Date: October 24
- Game time: 7:20 p.m.
- Game weather: Cloudy, 58 °F (14 °C)
- Game attendance: 71,107
- Referee: Scott Green (19)
- TV announcers (NBC): Al Michaels, Cris Collinsworth and Andrea Kremer
- Recap, Game Book

Game information

First quarter

- GB – Brandon Jackson 1-yard run (Mason Crosby kick), 5:07. Packers 7–0. Drive: 4 plays, 76 yards, 2:28.
- MIN – Percy Harvin 17-yard run (Ryan Longwell kick), 1:11. Tied 7–7. Drive: 7 plays, 44 yards, 3:56.

Second quarter

- GB – Andrew Quarless 9-yard pass from Aaron Rodgers (Mason Crosby kick), 14:53. Packers 14–7. Drive: 5 plays, 79 yards, 1:18.
- MIN – Adrian Peterson 1-yard run (Ryan Longwell kick), 10:16. Tied 14–14. Drive: 9 plays, 76 yards, 4:37.
- MIN – Ryan Longwell 28-yard field goal, 3:59. Vikings 17–14. Drive: 8 plays, 53 yards, 3:09.

Third quarter

- GB – Greg Jennings 14-yard pass from Aaron Rodgers (Mason Crosby kick), 8:44. Packers 21–17. Drive: 5 plays, 41 yards, 3:00.
- GB – Desmond Bishop 32-yard interception return (Mason Crosby kick), 7:45. Packers 28–17.
- MIN – Randy Moss 4-yard pass from Brett Favre (Ryan Longwell kick), 4:12. Packers 28–24. Drive: 6 plays, 58 yards, 3:33.

Fourth quarter

- No scoring plays.

Top passers

- MIN – Brett Favre – 16/29, 212 yards, TD, 3 INT
- GB – Aaron Rodgers – 21/34, 295 yards, 2 TD, 2 INT

Top rushers

- MIN – Adrian Peterson – 28 rushes, 131 yards, TD
- GB – Brandon Jackson – 13 rushes, 58 yards, TD

Top receivers

- MIN – Percy Harvin – 5 receptions, 65 yards
- GB – James Jones – 4 receptions, 107 yards

Trying to snap a two-game losing streak, the Packers stayed at home for a Week 7 NFC North Sunday night duel with the Minnesota Vikings, as quarterback Brett Favre made his return to Lambeau Field. Green Bay delivered the opening punch in the first quarter as running back Brandon Jackson got a 1-yard touchdown run. The Vikings answered with wide receiver Percy Harvin getting a 17-yard touchdown run. In the second quarter, the Packers regained the lead as quarterback Aaron Rodgers finding tight end Andrew Quarless on a 9-yard touchdown pass. Minnesota would take the lead with running back Adrian Peterson getting a 1-yard touchdown run, followed by kicker Ryan Longwell making a 28-yard field goal.

Green Bay regained the lead in the third quarter as Rodgers hooked up with wide receiver Greg Jennings on a 14-yard touchdown pass, followed by linebacker Desmond Bishop returning an interception 32 yards for a touchdown. The Vikings answered with Favre completing a 4-yard touchdown pass to wide receiver Randy Moss. Late in the 4th quarter, Favre led the Vikings to a last-minute drive to near the Packer 20 and nearly had a game-winning touchdown pass, but official review showed the receiver, Percy Harvin, did not have both feet in the end zone, therefore making the pass incomplete. The Vikings tried a game-winning pass on 4th down, but Favre's throw was high to Moss and the Packers held on to their first victory over their former QB.

With the win, Green Bay improved to 4–3.

=== Week 8 ===
Green Bay Packers at New York Jets

Team	1	2	3	4	Total
• Packers	3	0	0	6	9
Jets	0	0	0	0	0

- Date: October 31
- Location: New Meadowlands Stadium, East Rutherford, New Jersey
- Game start: 1:00 p.m. EST
- Game attendance: 78,484
- Game weather: Clear; 57 °F (14 °C)
- Referee: Jeff Triplette
- TV announcers (Fox): Kenny Albert, Daryl Johnston, and Tony Siragusa

Scoring summary
Q1	4:41	GB	Mason Crosby 20-yard field goal	GB 3–0
Q4	6:36	GB	Mason Crosby 41-yard field goal	GB 6–0
Q4	:27	GB	Mason Crosby 20-yard field goal	GB 9–0

After finally beating former quarterback Brett Favre in Week 7, the Packers traveled to New Meadowlands Stadium in East Rutherford, NJ to take on the New York Jets. The Packers took a 3–0 lead on a Mason Crosby 20-yard field goal in the first quarter and held that lead until the fourth quarter. Crosby then hit two field goals in the fourth quarter (from 41 and 40 yards respectively) to seal the victory for the Packers. While Aaron Rodgers and the Packer offense sputtered against the vaunted Jet defense, Green Bay's defense excelled in stopping the NFL's second-ranked rushing offense and intercepted Jets quarterback Mark Sanchez twice.

The win improved the Packers to 5–3 and in first place in the NFC North.

=== Week 9 ===
Dallas Cowboys at Green Bay Packers

Team	1	2	3	4	Total
Cowboys	0	7	0	0	7
• Packers	0	28	7	10	45

- Date: November 7
- Location: Lambeau Field, Green Bay, Wisconsin
- Game start: 8:20 p.m. EST
- Game attendance: 70,913
- Game weather: Clear; 43 °F (6 °C)
- Referee: Walt Coleman
- TV announcers (NBC): Al Michaels, Cris Collinsworth, and Andrea Kremer

Scoring summary
Q2	14:15	GB	Brandon Jackson 9-yard pass from Aaron Rodgers (Mason Crosby kick)	GB 7–0
Q2	8:26	GB	Brandon Jackson 2-yard run (Mason Crosby kick)	GB 14–0
Q2	2:13	GB	Greg Jennings 8-yard pass from Aaron Rodgers (Mason Crosby kick)	GB 21–0
Q2	2:04	GB	Nick Collins 26-yard fumble return (Mason Crosby kick)	GB 28–0
Q2	:16	DAL	Dez Bryant 2-yard pass from Jon Kitna (David Buehler kick)	GB 28–7
Q3	8:38	GB	James Jones 10-yard pass from Aaron Rodgers (Mason Crosby kick)	GB 35–7
Q4	13:08	GB	Mason Crosby 26-yard field goal	GB 38–7
Q4	11:07	GB	Clay Matthews 62-yard interception return (Mason Crosby kick)	GB 45–7

After winning against the New York Jets for the first time in the New York Area, the Green Bay Packers took on the lowly Dallas Cowboys. After a scoreless first quarter, the Packers offense that was limited to 9 points against the New York Jets, built a 28–0 lead before the Cowboys scored their only touchdown before the end of the first half. The Packers would score 17 more points in the second half before closing the game out 45–7 over the Dallas Cowboys. The Green Bay Packers intercepted Jon Kitna 3 times including one to Clay Matthews which would result in 62-yard touchdown, while Aaron Rodgers threw for 3 touchdowns. With the win, the Packers improved to 6–3.

=== Week 11 ===
Green Bay Packers at Minnesota Vikings

Team	1	2	3	4	Total
• Packers	0	17	7	7	31
Vikings	3	0	0	0	3

- Date: November 21
- Location: Mall of America Field, Minneapolis, Minnesota
- Game start: 1:00 p.m. EST
- Game attendance: 64,120
- Game weather: Indoors (dome)
- Referee: Clete Blakeman
- TV announcers (Fox): Joe Buck, Troy Aikman, and Pam Oliver

Scoring summary
Q1	6:06	MIN	Ryan Longwell 24-yard field goal	MIN 3–0
Q2	9:44	GB	Mason Crosby 42-yard field goal	Tie 3–3
Q2	5:14	GB	Greg Jennings 11-yard pass from Aaron Rodgers (Mason Crosby kick)	GB 10–3
Q2	:05	GB	James Jones 3-yard pass from Aaron Rodgers (Mason Crosby kick)	GB 17–3
Q3	12:01	GB	Greg Jennings 46-yard pass from Aaron Rodgers (Mason Crosby kick)	GB 24–3
Q4	9:42	GB	Greg Jennings 22-yard pass from Aaron Rodgers (Mason Crosby kick)	GB 31–3

In the Packers last game ever against the Vikings with Brett Favre under center, the Packers blew out the Vikings in a 31–3 victory. Aaron Rodgers completed 22/31 passes for 301 yards, with 4 touchdown passes, no interception, and a season-high passer rating of 141.3.

=== Week 12 ===
Green Bay Packers at Atlanta Falcons

Team	1	2	3	4	Total
Packers	3	0	7	7	17
• Falcons	3	7	0	10	20

- Date: November 28
- Location: Georgia Dome, Atlanta, Georgia
- Game start: 1:00 p.m. EST
- Game attendance: 68,204
- Game weather: Indoors (dome)
- Referee: Pete Morelli
- TV announcers (Fox): Thom Brennaman, Brian Billick, and Laura Okmin

Scoring summary
Q1	9:31	ATL	Matt Bryant 38-yard field goal	ATL 3–0
Q1	:04	GB	Mason Crosby 22-yard field goal	Tie 3–3
Q2	:08	ATL	Tony Gonzalez 4-yard pass from Matt Ryan (Matt Bryant kick)	ATL 10–3
Q3	7:17	GB	Aaron Rodgers 1-yard run (Mason Crosby kick)	Tie 10–10
Q4	14:24	ATL	Michael Turner 1-yard run (Matt Bryant kick)	ATL 17–10
Q4	:56	GB	Jordy Nelson 10-yard pass from Aaron Rodgers (Mason Crosby kick)	Tie 17–17
Q4	:09	ATL	Matt Bryant 47-yard field goal	ATL 20–17

=== Week 13 ===
San Francisco 49ers at Green Bay Packers

Team	1	2	3	4	Total
49ers	3	10	3	0	16
• Packers	0	14	14	6	34

- Date: December 5
- Location: Lambeau Field, Green Bay, Wisconsin
- Game start: 1:00 p.m. EST
- Game attendance: 70,575
- Game weather: Cloudy; 26 °F (−3 °C)
- Referee: Bill Leavy
- TV announcers (Fox): Thom Brennaman and Brian Billick

Scoring summary
Q1	11:49	SF	Jeff Reed 44-yard field goal	SF 3–0
Q2	12:34	SF	Jeff Reed 26-yard field goal	SF 6–0
Q2	7:02	GB	Greg Jennings 57-yard pass from Aaron Rodgers (Mason Crosby kick)	GB 7–6
Q2	1:46	GB	John Kuhn 1-yard run (Mason Crosby kick)	GB 14–6
Q2	1:26	SF	Vernon Davis 66-yard pass from Troy Smith (Jeff Reed kick)	GB 14–13
Q3	11:52	GB	Donald Driver 61-yard pass from Aaron Rodgers (Mason Crosby kick)	GB 21–13
Q3	6:39	SF	Jeff Reed 23-yard field goal	GB 21–16
Q3	3:37	GB	Greg Jennings 1-yard pass from Aaron Rodgers (Mason Crosby kick)	GB 28–16
Q4	13:50	GB	Mason Crosby 43-yard field goal	GB 31–16
Q4	3:10	GB	Mason Crosby 24-yard field goal	GB 34–16

=== Week 14 ===
Green Bay Packers at Detroit Lions

Team	1	2	3	4	Total
Packers	0	0	3	0	3
• Lions	0	0	0	7	7

- Date: December 12
- Location: Ford Field, Detroit, Michigan
- Game start: 1:00 p.m. EST
- Game attendance: 57,659
- Game weather: Indoors (dome)
- Referee: Gene Steratore
- TV announcers (Fox): Sam Rosen and Tim Ryan

Scoring summary
Q3	10:55	GB	Mason Crosby 42-yard field goal	GB 3–0
Q4	7:55	DET	Will Heller 13-yard pass from Drew Stanton (Dave Rayner kick)	DET 7–3

Green Bay lost to Detroit for the first time in 11 games against the Lions. Also, at the end of the 1st half, Aaron Rodgers suffered a concussion and wouldn't play the next week.

=== Week 15 ===
Green Bay Packers at New England Patriots

Team	1	2	3	4	Total
Packers	3	14	7	3	27
• Patriots	7	7	7	10	31

- Date: December 19
- Location: Gillette Stadium, Foxboro, Massachusetts
- Game start: 8:20 p.m. EST
- Game attendance: 68,756
- Game weather: Cloudy; 32 °F (0 °C)
- Referee: Ed Hochuli
- TV announcers (NBC): Al Michaels, Cris Collinsworth, and Andrea Kremer

Scoring summary
Q1	8:45	GB	Mason Crosby 31-yard field goal	GB 3–0
Q1	6:19	NE	BenJarvus Green-Ellis 33-yard run (Shayne Graham kick)	NE 7–3
Q2	14:51	GB	James Jones 66-yard pass from Matt Flynn (Mason Crosby kick)	GB 10–7
Q2	2:17	GB	Greg Jennings 1-yard pass from Matt Flynn (Mason Crosby kick)	GB 17–7
Q2	1:08	NE	Aaron Hernandez 2-yard pass from Tom Brady (Shayne Graham kick)	GB 17–14
Q3	12:04	NE	Kyle Arrington 36-yard interception return (Shayne Graham kick)	NE 21–17
Q3	5:08	GB	John Kuhn 6-yard pass from Matt Flynn (Mason Crosby kick)	GB 24–21
Q4	13:49	GB	Mason Crosby 19-yard field goal	GB 27–21
Q4	11:05	NE	Shayne Graham 38-yard field goal	GB 27–24
Q4	7:14	NE	Aaron Hernandez 10-yard pass from Tom Brady (Shayne Graham kick)	NE 31–27

This was the Packers first road loss to New England since 1985. This would be the team's last loss for 364 days, covering 19 games.

=== Week 16 ===
New York Giants at Green Bay Packers

Team	1	2	3	4	Total
Giants	0	14	3	0	17
• Packers	14	7	10	14	45

- Date: December 26
- Location: Lambeau Field, Green Bay, Wisconsin
- Game start: 4:15 p.m. EST
- Game attendance: 70,649
- Game weather: Partly cloudy; 25 °F (−4 °C)
- Referee: Walt Anderson
- TV announcers (Fox): Joe Buck, Troy Aikman, and Pam Oliver

Scoring summary
Q1	7:53	GB	Jordy Nelson 80-yard pass from Aaron Rodgers (Mason Crosby kick)	GB 7–0
Q1	1:47	GB	James Jones 3-yard pass from Aaron Rodgers (Mason Crosby kick)	GB 14–0
Q2	11:40	NYG	Hakeem Nicks 36-yard pass from Eli Manning (Lawrence Tynes kick)	GB 14–7
Q2	5:13	NYG	Mario Manningham 85-yard pass from Eli Manning (Lawrence Tynes kick)	Tie 14–14
Q2	1:54	GB	John Kuhn 8-yard run (Mason Crosby kick)	GB 21–14
Q3	9:56	GB	Mason Crosby 31-yard field goal	GB 24–14
Q3	7:10	NYG	Lawrence Tynes 38-yard field goal	GB 24–17
Q3	4:44	GB	Donald Lee 1-yard pass from Aaron Rodgers (Mason Crosby kick)	GB 31–17
Q4	6:58	GB	John Kuhn 5-yard pass from Aaron Rodgers (Mason Crosby kick)	GB 38–17
Q4	4:20	GB	John Kuhn 1-yard run (Mason Crosby kick)	GB 45–17

In week 16, the Green Bay Packers dominated the New York Giants, winning 45–17 in Lambeau Field.

=== Week 17 ===
Chicago Bears at Green Bay Packers

Team	1	2	3	4	Total
Bears	0	3	0	0	3
• Packers	0	0	3	7	10

- Date: January 2
- Location: Lambeau Field, Green Bay, Wisconsin
- Game start: 4:15 p.m. EST
- Game attendance: 70,833
- Game weather: Clear; 19 °F (−7 °C)
- Referee: Alberto Riveron
- TV announcers (Fox): Joe Buck, Troy Aikman, and Pam Oliver

Scoring summary
Q2	4:31	CHI	Robbie Gould 30-yard field goal	CHI 3–0
Q3	2:39	GB	Mason Crosby 23-yard field goal	Tie 3–3
Q4	12:42	GB	Donald Lee 1-yard pass from Aaron Rodgers (Mason Crosby kick)	GB 10–3

The Packers finished the 2010 regular season vs. the Chicago Bears at Lambeau Field. Going into the final Sunday of the season, the Packers needed a win or a New York Giants and a Tampa Bay Buccaneers loss to clinch the sixth and final NFC wild-card seed. The Bears, on the other hand, had the NFC North Division title and the number 2 NFC seed wrapped up, though they played their starters for the contest. Tampa defeated the New Orleans Saints in their 1 o'clock contest before the Packers game, so the Packers had to come out of the game with a win.

During the first quarter, the Packers and Bears offenses exchanged possession with no scoring. The Bears forced a turnover with 5:58 left in the 1st when Donald Driver was stripped of the ball after an 8-yard reception and the fumble was recovered by the Bears.

In the second quarter, the Bears put their first and only points on the board for the day when Robbie Gould successfully converted a 30-yard field goal with 4:35 left in the half. The scoring drive was highlighted with two 20+ yard passes by Jay Cutler to WR Rashied Davis and RB Matt Forte to get them into field goal range. The teams entered into halftime of the defensive contest with the Bears holding onto a slim 3–0 lead.

After the half, the Bears started the quarter with the ball. After moving the ball into Packers territory, the Bears chose to go for it on a fourth and two at the Packers 40. Jay Cutler failed to complete a short pass to Rashied Davis and the Packers took over on downs. On the Packers' first play of the second half, Rodgers threw a deep pass intended for Greg Jennings but the pass was intercepted by CB Charles Tillman and returned to the Packers 15-yard line. The interception was challenged, but upheld. After a holding penalty and a couple of short gains by the Bears, Jay Cutler was intercepted on 3rd down in the endzone by Packers safety Charlie Peprah for a touchback.

The Packers and Bears swapped possessions and CB Tramon Williams returned the Bears punt back to the Bears 44-yard line to set the Packers up in optimal field position. Three plays into the drive, Aaron Rodgers completed a 33-yard pass to Greg Jennings down to the Bears 1-yard line. The Packers failed to score a touchdown and settled for a 23-yard field goal attempt by Mason Crosby which was successfully converted to tie the game at 3–3.

At the start of the fourth quarter, the Packers had possession and again got into the red zone, highlighted by two key plays, a 21-yard pass over the middle to Donald Driver and a 46-yard pass deep right to Greg Jennings that set up the Packers for a 1st and goal at the Bears 1-yard line for the second time of the game. This time though, the Packers scored a touchdown on 1st down when Aaron Rodgers completed a pass into the end zone to Donald Lee short right for his second 1-yard touchdown reception in two games to give the Packers a 10–3 lead with 12:46 remaining in the game.

After exchanging possessions, the Bears took over with 4:49 left in the game at the Bears 2-yard line. The Bears moved the ball into Packers territory with many short passes down to the Packers 32-yard line. Needing a touchdown to tie the game, the Bears continued to pass the ball but their drive came to an end when Cutler passed deep left to Devin Hester and the pass was intercepted by Nick Collins and returned 24 yards to the Bears 35-yard line. The game marked the 16th time in the past 17 seasons that Green Bay had won its final regular-season game.

With the interception, the Packers sealed their victory over the rival Bears, along with the 6th seed in the NFL playoffs. The Giants later won their game against the Washington Redskins, but it was all for naught due to the Packers holding tiebreakers over the Giants and Buccaneers.

== Postseason ==
Week	Date	Opponent (seed)	Result	Record	Game site	NFL.com recap
NFC Wild Card	January 9	at Philadelphia Eagles (3)	W 21–16	1–0	Lincoln Financial Field	Recap
NFC Divisional	January 15	at Atlanta Falcons (1)	W 48–21	2–0	Georgia Dome	Recap
NFC Championship	January 23	at Chicago Bears (2)	W 21–14	3–0	Soldier Field	Recap
Super Bowl XLV	February 6	vs. Pittsburgh Steelers (A2)	W 31–25	4–0	Cowboys Stadium	Recap

=== Wild Card ===
NFC Wild Card
Green Bay Packers at Philadelphia Eagles

Team	1	2	3	4	Total
• Packers	7	7	7	0	21
Eagles	0	3	7	6	16

- Date: January 9
- Location: Lincoln Financial Field, Philadelphia, Pennsylvania
- Game start: 4:30 p.m. EST
- Game attendance: 69,144
- Game weather: Sunny; 30 °F (−1 °C)
- Referee: Pete Morelli
- TV announcers (Fox): Joe Buck, Troy Aikman, and Pam Oliver

Scoring summary
Q1	:08	GB	Tom Crabtree 7-yard pass from Aaron Rodgers (Mason Crosby kick)	GB 7–0
Q2	5:21	GB	James Jones 9-yard pass from Aaron Rodgers (Mason Crosby kick)	GB 14–0
Q2	1:11	PHI	David Akers 29-yard field goal	GB 14–3
Q3	13:50	PHI	Jason Avant 24-yard pass from Michael Vick (David Akers kick)	GB 14–10
Q3	7:33	GB	Brandon Jackson 16-yard pass from Aaron Rodgers (Mason Crosby kick)	GB 21–10
Q4	4:02	PHI	Michael Vick 1-yard run (pass failed)	GB 21–16

Entering the postseason as the NFC's No. 6 seed, the Packers began their playoff run at Lincoln Financial Field for the NFC Wild Card game against the No. 3 Philadelphia Eagles. This was a rematch of their Week 1 win. The Packers delivered the game's opening strike in the first quarter as quarterback Aaron Rodgers found rookie tight end Tom Crabtree on a 4-yard touchdown pass. Green Bay would add onto their lead in the second quarter as Rodgers connected with wide receiver James Jones on a 9-yard touchdown pass. The Eagles answered with kicker David Akers getting a 29-yard field goal.

Philadelphia managed to cut away at their deficit in the third quarter as quarterback Michael Vick completed a 24-yard touchdown pass to wide receiver Jason Avant, but the Packers responded with Rodgers hooking up with running back Brandon Jackson on a 16-yard touchdown pass. The Eagles tried to rally as Vick got a 1-yard touchdown run (with a failed two-point conversion), but Green Bay's defense held on to preserve the victory as Tramon Williams intercepted a Michael Vick pass in the end zone with 36 seconds remaining.

With the win, the Packers improved their overall record to 11–6.

=== Divisional ===
NFC Divisional
Green Bay Packers at Atlanta Falcons

Team	1	2	3	4	Total
• Packers	0	28	14	6	48
Falcons	7	7	0	7	21

- Date: January 15
- Location: Georgia Dome, Atlanta, Georgia
- Game start: 8:00 p.m. EST
- Game attendance: 69,210
- Game weather: Indoors (dome)
- Referee: John Parry
- TV announcers (Fox): Joe Buck, Troy Aikman, Pam Oliver and Chris Myers

Scoring summary
Q1	5:00	ATL	Michael Turner 12-yard run (Matt Bryant kick)	ATL 7–0
Q2	12:04	GB	Jordy Nelson 6-yard pass from Aaron Rodgers (Mason Crosby kick)	Tie 7–7
Q2	11:50	ATL	Eric Weems 102-yard kickoff return (Matt Bryant kick)	ATL 14–7
Q2	6:06	GB	John Kuhn 1-yard run (Mason Crosby kick)	Tie 14–14
Q2	:42	GB	James Jones 20-yard pass from Aaron Rodgers (Mason Crosby kick)	GB 21–14
Q2	:00	GB	Tramon Williams 70-yard interception return (Mason Crosby kick)	GB 28–14
Q3	8:28	GB	Aaron Rodgers 7-yard run (Mason Crosby kick)	GB 35–14
Q3	2:41	GB	John Kuhn 7-yard pass from Aaron Rodgers (Mason Crosby kick)	GB 42–14
Q4	14:21	ATL	Roddy White 6-yard pass from Matt Ryan (Matt Bryant kick)	GB 42–21
Q4	6:29	GB	Mason Crosby 43-yard field goal	GB 45–21
Q4	1:56	GB	Mason Crosby 32-yard field goal	GB 48–21

Coming off their win over the Eagles, the Packers flew to the Georgia Dome for the NFC Divisional Round against the top-seeded Atlanta Falcons, in hopes to avenge their Week 12 loss. Aaron Rodgers had arguably the greatest game of his career. He completed 31 of 36 passes for 366 yards and 4 total touchdowns. Green Bay trailed in the first quarter as Falcons running back Michael Turner got a 12-yard touchdown run. The Packers answered in the second quarter as quarterback Aaron Rodgers found wide receiver Jordy Nelson on a 6-yard touchdown pass, but Atlanta immediately struck back as wide receiver Eric Weems returned a kickoff 102 yards for a touchdown. Green Bay took the lead with a 1-yard touchdown run from fullback John Kuhn, followed by Rodgers finding James Jones on a 20-yard touchdown, along with cornerback Tramon Williams returning an interception 70 yards for a touchdown as time expired in the first half.

The Packers added onto their lead in the third quarter with a 7-yard touchdown run from Rodgers, followed by his 7-yard touchdown pass to Kuhn. Atlanta tried to rally in the fourth quarter as quarterback Matt Ryan completed a 6-yard touchdown pass to wide receiver Roddy White, yet Green Bay closed out their dominating night with a 43-yard and a 32-yard field goal from Crosby. The Packers never once punted during the game. With the win, the Packers improved their overall record to 12–6.

Green Bay's 48 points became the franchise's single-game postseason record and the 48–21 final score is also the second largest win margin in Packers playoff history.

=== NFC Championship ===
NFC Championship
Green Bay Packers at Chicago Bears

Team	1	2	3	4	Total
• Packers	7	7	0	7	21
Bears	0	0	0	14	14

- Date: January 23
- Location: Soldier Field, Chicago, Illinois
- Game start: 3:00 p.m. EST
- Game attendance: 62,377
- Game weather: Partly cloudy; 20 °F (−7 °C)
- Referee: Terry McAulay
- TV announcers (Fox): Joe Buck, Troy Aikman, Pam Oliver, and Chris Myers

Scoring summary
Q1	10:50	GB	Aaron Rodgers 1-yard run (Mason Crosby kick)	GB 7–0
Q2	11:13	GB	James Starks 4-yard run (Mason Crosby kick)	GB 14–0
Q4	12:02	CHI	Chester Taylor 1-yard run (Robbie Gould kick)	GB 14–7
Q4	6:04	GB	B.J. Raji 18-yard interception return (Mason Crosby kick)	GB 21–7
Q4	4:43	CHI	Earl Bennett 35-yard pass from Caleb Hanie (Robbie Gould kick)	GB 21–14

Coming off their win over the Falcons, the Packers flew to Soldier Field for the NFC Championship Game against their historic rival, the No. 2 seed Chicago Bears, in Round 3 of their 2010 series. This would be the second playoff meeting between the two teams, the first since falling to Chicago 33–14 in 1941.

Green Bay delivered the game's opening strike in the first quarter with a 1-yard touchdown run from quarterback Aaron Rodgers. The Packers added onto their lead in the second quarter with a 4-yard touchdown run from rookie running back James Starks. After a scoreless third quarter, the Bears answered in the fourth quarter as running back Chester Taylor got a 1-yard touchdown run. Afterwards, Green Bay struck back with nose tackle B.J. Raji returning an interception 18 yards for a touchdown. Chicago tried to rally as quarterback Caleb Hanie completed a 35-yard touchdown pass to wide receiver Earl Bennett, the Packers' defense held on to preserve the victory.

With the win, not only did they improve their overall record to 13–6, but they advanced to Super Bowl XLV (their first appearance since Super Bowl XXXII). In the process, they became the NFC's first No. 6 seed to reach the Super Bowl. They also became the 3rd NFC wild card team to reach the Super Bowl, and the first since the New York Giants in 2008.

The Packers also went 3–0 on the road in the postseason after going 3–5 on the road in the regular season, including losses in their last three road games.

=== Super Bowl ===
Super Bowl XLV
Pittsburgh Steelers vs. Green Bay Packers

Team	1	2	3	4	Total
Steelers	0	10	7	8	25
• Packers	14	7	0	10	31

- Date: February 6
- Location: AT&T Stadium, Arlington, Texas
- Game start: 6:29 p.m. EST
- Game attendance: 103,219
- Game weather: Indoors (roof closed)
- Referee: Walt Anderson
- TV announcers (Fox): Joe Buck, Troy Aikman, Pam Oliver, and Chris Myers

Scoring summary
Q1	3:44	GB	Jordy Nelson 29-yard pass from Aaron Rodgers (Mason Crosby kick)	GB 7–0
Q1	3:20	GB	Nick Collins 37-yard interception return (Mason Crosby kick)	GB 14–0
Q2	11:08	PIT	Shaun Suisham 33-yard field goal	GB 14–3
Q2	2:24	GB	Greg Jennings 24-yard pass from Aaron Rodgers (Mason Crosby kick)	GB 21–3
Q2	:39	PIT	Hines Ward 8-yard pass from Ben Roethlisberger (Shaun Suisham kick)	GB 21–10
Q3	10:19	PIT	Rashard Mendenhall 8-yard run (Shaun Suisham kick)	GB 21–17
Q4	11:57	GB	Greg Jennings 8-yard pass from Aaron Rodgers (Mason Crosby kick)	GB 28–17
Q4	7:34	PIT	Mike Wallace 25-yard pass from Ben Roethlisberger (Antwaan Randle El run)	GB 28–25
Q4	2:07	GB	Mason Crosby 23-yard field goal	GB 31–25

- Aaron Rodgers 24/39, 304 Yds, 3 TD (Super Bowl MVP)
- Aaron Rodgers became one of only four quarterbacks in the history of the league to have at least 300 yards passing, with at least 3 touchdown passes, and no interceptions in the Super Bowl. He was unanimously voted the game's MVP.
- Rodgers also set Packer Super Bowl records for most passing yards and touchdown passes.
- Jordy Nelson set the Packer Super Bowl record for most receiving yards, with 140.
- Greg Jennings had two touchdown catches
- Donald Driver left the game in the first half with a sprained ankle
- Charles Woodson left the game after suffering a broken collarbone
- Sam Shields also left the game due to injury.

== Regular season statistical leaders ==
	Player(s)	Value	NFL Rank	NFC Rank
Passing yards	Aaron Rodgers	3,922 Yards	7th	3rd
Passing touchdowns	Aaron Rodgers	28 TDs	T-6th	T-3rd
Rushing yards	Brandon Jackson	703 Yards	32nd	15th
Rushing touchdowns	Aaron Rodgers and John Kuhn	4 TDs	T-32nd	T-14th
Receiving yards	Greg Jennings	1,265 Yards	4th	2nd
Receiving touchdowns	Greg Jennings	12 TDs	T-2nd	T-2nd
Points	Mason Crosby	112 Points	11th	5th
Kickoff Return Yards	Jordy Nelson	496 Yards	34th	29th
Punt return Yards	Tramon Williams	326 Yards	9th	7th
Tackles	A. J. Hawk	111 Tackles	T-22nd	12th
Sacks	Clay Matthews	13.5 Sacks	4th	2nd
Interceptions	Tramon Williams	6 INTs	T-5th	T-2nd

stats are correct through Week 17.

== Postseason statistical leaders ==
	Player(s)	Value	NFL Rank	NFC Rank
Passing yards	Aaron Rodgers	1,094 Yards	1st	1st
Passing touchdowns	Aaron Rodgers	9 TDs	1st	1st
Rushing yards	James Starks	315 Yards	1st	1st
Rushing touchdowns	Aaron Rodgers	2 TDs	T-2nd	T-2nd
Receiving yards	Greg Jennings	303 Yards	1st	1st
Receiving touchdowns	Greg Jennings, Jordy Nelson & James Jones	2 TDs	T-2nd	T-2nd
Points	Mason Crosby	25 Points	1st	1st
Kickoff Return Yards	James Starks	70 Yards	T-7th	T-3rd
Punt return Yards	Tramon Williams	31 Yards	4th	2nd
Tackles	Desmond Bishop	26 Tackles	2nd	1st
Sacks	Clay Matthews	3.5 Sacks	3rd	1st
Interceptions	Tramon Williams	3 INTs	1st	1st

stats are correct through Super Bowl XLV.

=== Statistical league rankings ===
- Total Offense (YPG): 8th
- Passing (YPG): 5th
- Rushing (YPG): 22nd
- Points (PPG): 8th
- Total Defense (YPG): 5th
- Passing (YPG): 5th
- Rushing (YPG): 18th
- Points (PPG): 2nd

Stats correct through week 16.

== Awards and records ==
=== Awards ===
==== Weekly awards ====
- K Mason Crosby was named NFC Special Teams Player of the Week for games played on the NFL Kickoff 2010 Weekend (September 9, 12–13).
- OLB Clay Matthews was named NFC Defensive Player of the Week for games played on Week 2 (September 18–20).
- CB Charles Woodson was named NFC Defensive Player of the Week for games played on Week 4 (October 3–4).
- P Tim Masthay was named NFC Special Teams Player of the Week for games played on Week 8 (October 31, – November 1,).
- OLB Clay Matthews was named NFC Defensive Player of the Week for games played on Week 9 (November 7–8)
- WR Greg Jennings was named NFC Offensive Player of the Week for games played on Week 11 (November 18, 21–22).
- QB Aaron Rodgers was named NFC Offensive Player of the Week for games played on Week 13 (December 2, 5–6).
- OLB Erik Walden was named NFC Defensive Player of the Week for games played on Week 17 (January 2,).

==== Monthly awards ====
- OLB Clay Matthews was named NFC Defensive Player of the Month for the month of September.
- QB Aaron Rodgers was named NFC Offensive Player of the Month for the month of December/January.

=== Annual awards ===
- OLB Clay Matthews was named Sporting News 2010 NFL Defensive Player of the Year.
- QB Aaron Rodgers was named FedEx Air NFL Player of the Year.
- G Josh Sitton was named Lineman of the Year by the NFL Alumni Association.
- OT Bryan Bulaga was named to the 2010 NFL All Rookie Team.
- QB Aaron Rodgers was named Super Bowl MVP for Super Bowl XLV.

=== Records ===
==== Team ====
===== Game =====
- The Packers committed a team record 18 penalties in their 17-20 loss on Monday Night Football against the Chicago Bears at Soldier Field on September 27. The previous club record was 17 penalties against the Boston Yanks in 1945.
- The Packers scored a franchise postseason record 48 points in their 48–21 win against the Atlanta Falcons in the Divisional Round in the playoffs.
- The Packers and Steelers set the record for fewest rushing attempts, game, both teams – 36, Green Bay (13) vs. Pittsburgh (23).

===== Season =====
- With the Packers never trailing in the Super Bowl, they became the first team in the Super Bowl era that never trailed by more than 7 points at any point of any game during the season. The last team to achieve this feat was the 1962 Detroit Lions.
- The Packers were the first team in NFL history to have at least 5 losses and all of those losses being by 4 points or less.
- The Packers became the first 6th seed NFC team to win the Super Bowl and becoming the first to win it despite playing 3 straight road playoff games.
- The team's 240 points surrendered is the second best in team history.
- Aaron Rodgers became only the fourth QB in playoff history to record over 1,000 yards passing in a postseason, as well as tying the NFL playoff record for most consecutive 3 touchdown passing games and becoming the only QB to ever pass for 10 touchdowns in three straight playoff games.
- Clay Matthews 3.5 postseason sacks are a franchise record.

===== Playoffs =====
- The Packers became the first playoff team to score a touchdown off an interception in three straight playoff games (Tramon Williams vs the Atlanta Falcons, B. J. Raji vs the Chicago Bears and Nick Collins vs the Pittsburgh Steelers).

==== Individual ====
===== Game =====
- K Mason Crosby successfully converted a team record 56-yard field goal at the end of the 1st half versus the Philadelphia Eagles on September 12, 2010. The previous Packer record was 54 yards shared by Chris Jacke, Dave Rayner and Ryan Longwell.
- QB Aaron Rodgers tied Don Majkowski for third on the Most passes completed, game list with 34 passes completed vs the Chicago Bears at Soldier Field on September 27,.
- RB James Starks set the Packers record for Most yards rushing by a Rookie, Playoff game with 123 yards rushing vs the Philadelphia Eagles at Lincoln Financial Field on January 9,.
- WR Jordy Nelson set the Packers record for Most yards receiving, Super Bowl with 140 yards in Super Bowl XLV. The previous record was 138 yards by Max McGee in Super Bowl I.

===== Season =====
- QB Aaron Rodgers tied Lynn Dickey for 2nd place on the Most Seasons, 3,000 or More Yards Passing list with 3 seasons.
- QB Aaron Rodgers passed Brett Favre for 2nd place on the Most consecutive attempts, Without Interception list with 177 consecutive attempts (active streak wk 13).
- QB Aaron Rodgers tied Bart Starr for most seasons with a passer rating of over 100.0 with two.
- QB Aaron Rodgers' 356 rushing yards is the second most by a QB in franchise history
- QB Aaron Rodgers set the franchise record for most passing yards (1,094), touchdown passes (9), and total touchdowns (11) in a postseason.
- OLB Clay Matthews set the franchise record for most sacks in the first two games of the season with 6.
- OLB Clay Matthews set the franchise record for most sacks in postseason with 3.5.

===== Career =====
- CB Charles Woodson set the Packers record for Most touchdowns on interceptions, career with 8 on his interception return for a touchdown vs the Detroit Lions at Lambeau Field.
- OLB Clay Matthews tied three players for the Packers record of Most Seasons, 10 or More Sacks with 2.
- OLB Clay Matthews tied three players for the Packers record of Most Consecutive Seasons, 10 or More Sacks with 2.

=== 2011 Pro Bowl selections ===
The Packers 2011 Pro Bowl selections were announced on December 28. The Packers initially had five players on the Pro Bowl list. These players were WR Greg Jennings, LT Chad Clifton, OLB Clay Matthews, CB Charles Woodson and S Nick Collins. CB Tramon Williams was later added as a reserve on January 20, when Philadelphia Eagles CB Asante Samuel pulled out of the Pro Bowl due to injury. The Packers also had a first alternate in QB Aaron Rodgers and four lower alternates, NT B. J. Raji, G Josh Sitton, ILB A. J. Hawk and WR Donald Driver. No Packers took part in the Pro Bowl, due to their participation in Super Bowl XLV.

Position	Player	Team
WR	Greg Jennings	Reserve
OT	Chad Clifton	Reserve
OLB	Clay Matthews	Starter
CB	Charles Woodson	Starter
CB	Tramon Williams	Reserve
FS	Nick Collins	Starter

Notes:

^{b} : Replacement selection due to injury or vacancy.
