= Brandon Jackson (American football) =

American football player (born 1985)

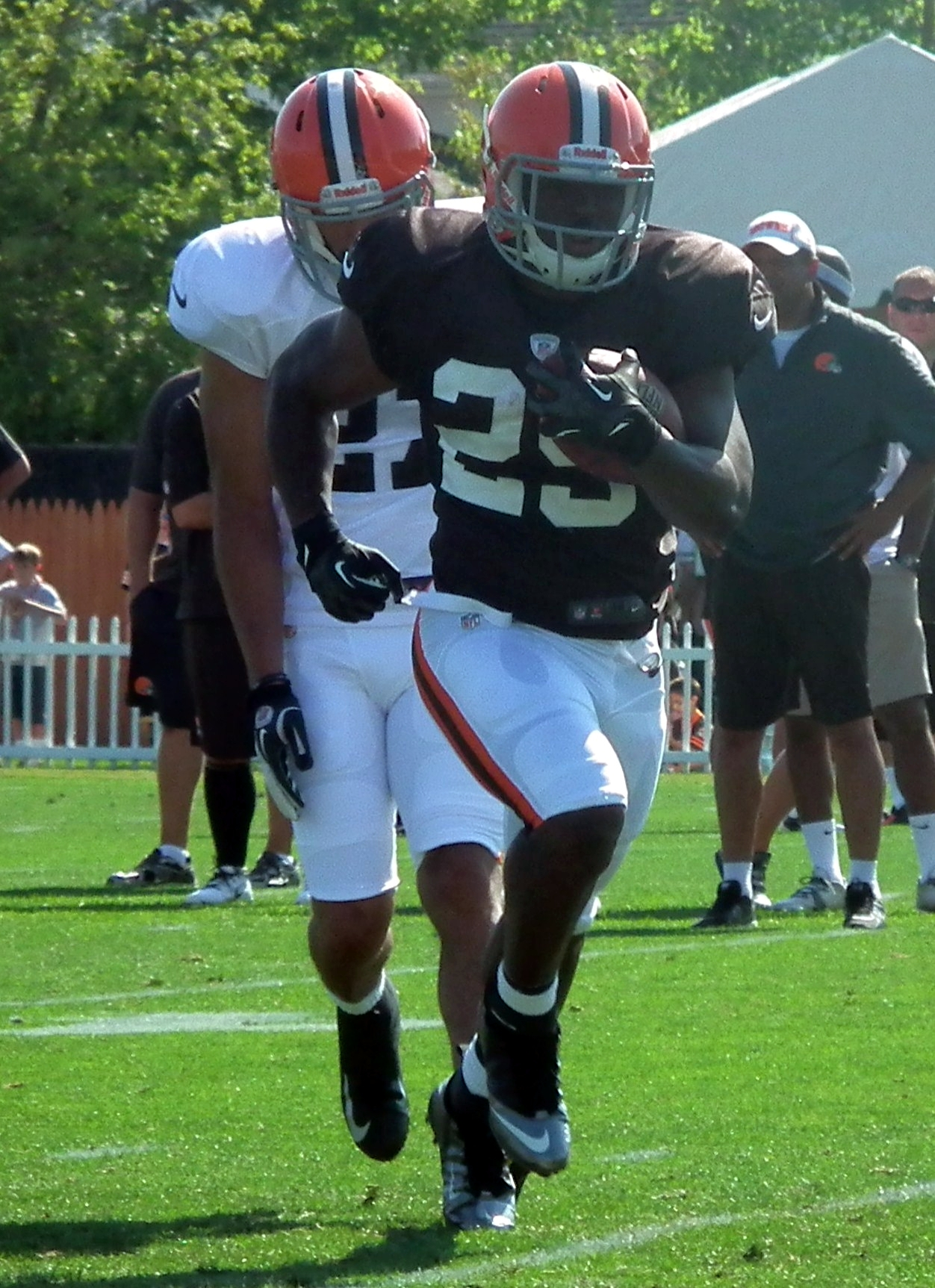
- Jackson with the Cleveland Browns in 2012

No. 29, 32
- Position: Running back

Personal information
- Born: October 2, 1985 (age 41); Detroit, Michigan, U.S.
- Listed height: 5 ft 11 in (1.80 m)
- Listed weight: 210 lb (95 kg)

Career information
- High school: Horn Lake (Horn Lake, Mississippi)
- College: Nebraska (2004–2006)
- NFL draft: 2007: 2nd round, 63rd overall pick

Career history
- Green Bay Packers (2007–2010); Cleveland Browns (2011–2012)

Awards and highlights
- Super Bowl champion (XLV); Second-team All-Big 12 (2006)

Career NFL statistics
- Rushing attempts: 355
- Rushing yards: 1,383
- Rushing touchdowns: 7
- Receptions: 112
- Receiving yards: 864
- Receiving touchdowns: 2
- Stats at Pro Football Reference

Brandon Lamar Jackson (born October 2, 1985) is an American former professional football player who was a running back in the National Football League (NFL). He was selected by the Green Bay Packers in the second round of the 2007 NFL draft. He later won Super Bowl XLV with the Packers against the Pittsburgh Steelers. He played college football for the Nebraska Cornhuskers.

== Early life ==
Jackson was a two-time Class 5A state offensive player of the year at Horn Lake High School. He was also named to the Dandy Dozen by the Jackson Clarion-Ledger, signifying the top 12 players in the state of Mississippi.

In 2003, Jackson was a significant driving force taking his team from a 0–5 losing streak to the Mississippi State Playoffs, losing their first round and going out at 5–6.

=== Track and field ===
Aside from football Jackson was also a track star with, he lettered four times in track, and had a career best of 10.6 seconds in the 100 meters. He was sixth at state in the 100 as a senior, and helped the 4x200-meter relay squad finish third at state in 2004, while aiding the 4x100 relay squad's fourth-place state finish. He was also part of the 4x400-meter relay team that was second at the Class 5A state meet in 2003.

At the University of Nebraska–Lincoln, he competed in the 60 meters and 200 meters, recording personal bests of 6.86 seconds and 21.75 seconds, respectively.

== College career ==
Jackson played college football at Nebraska. During his career at Nebraska he started 11 of 33 games, rushing for 1,431 yards on 291 carries and 14 touchdowns.

== Professional career ==
Pre-draft measurables
Height	Weight	40-yard dash	10-yard split	20-yard split	20-yard shuttle	Three-cone drill	Vertical jump	Broad jump	Bench press
5 ft 10 in (1.78 m)	210 lb (95 kg)	4.41 s	1.49 s	2.52 s	4.14 s	7.00 s	37 in (0.94 m)	10 ft 2 in (3.10 m)	21 reps
All values from NFL Combine

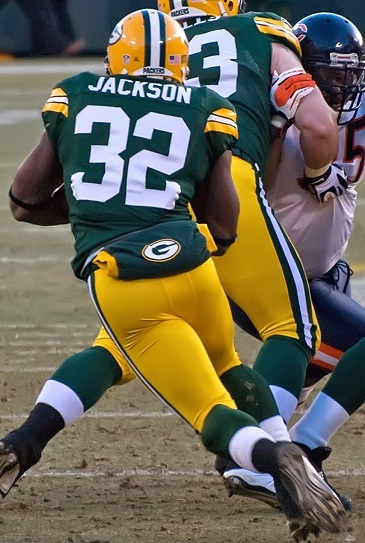
Jackson in January 2011

=== Green Bay Packers ===
Jackson was drafted by the Green Bay Packers in the second round of the 2007 NFL Draft with the 63rd overall pick. He scored his first NFL touchdown in Week 3, on September 23, 2007, against the San Diego Chargers. Jackson topped the 100 yard mark for the first time in his career on December 30, 2007. On January 2, 2008, Jackson was voted NFL Rookie of the Week for his performance against the Detroit Lions in which he ran the ball 20 times for 113 yards and made two receptions for 22 yards in the Packers 34–13 victory. In the 11 games he played in, Jackson rushed for 267 yards on 75 carries and a touchdown and added 130 yards on 16 receptions.

Jackson played in 13 games during his 2008 season, rushing for 248 yards on 45 carries and a touchdown, with 30 receptions for 185 yards. In 2009, Jackson ran for 111 yards in 12 games on 37 attempts, with two rushing touchdowns and a receiving touchdown.

When starter Ryan Grant suffered ligament damage to his ankle during the first game of the 2010 season, Jackson was named the starter. During the regular season, Jackson achieved new career highs with 703 yards rushing and 342 yards receiving. However, Jackson would later lose his starting job to rookie RB James Starks.

At the end of the 2010 season, Jackson and the Packers appeared in Super Bowl XLV against the Pittsburgh Steelers. He had one reception for 14 yards in the game.

=== Cleveland Browns ===
Jackson was signed by the Cleveland Browns on July 29, 2011. He suffered a toe injury in the preseason, and was placed on the injured reserve list in September. On May 16, 2013, he signed a one-year contract to stay with the Cleveland Browns.

== NFL career statistics ==
Legend
**Bold**	Career high

=== Regular season ===
Year	Team	Games		Rushing					Receiving				
Year	Team	GP	GS	Att	Yds	Avg	Lng	TD	Rec	Yds	Avg	Lng	TD
2007	GNB	11	3	75	267	3.6	46	1	16	130	8.1	16	0
2008	GNB	13	0	45	248	5.5	32	1	30	185	6.2	18	0
2009	GNB	12	0	37	111	3.0	9	2	21	187	8.9	17	**1**
2010	GNB	**16**	**13**	**190**	**703**	3.7	**71**	**3**	**43**	**342**	8.0	**37**	**1**
2012	CLE	2	0	8	54	**6.8**	25	0	2	20	**10.0**	14	0
		54	16	355	1,383	3.9	71	7	112	864	7.7	37	2

=== Playoffs ===
Year	Team	Games		Rushing					Receiving				
Year	Team	GP	GS	Att	Yds	Avg	Lng	TD	Rec	Yds	Avg	Lng	TD
2007	GNB	2	0	**8**	**34**	4.3	**18**	0	2	14	7.0	13	**1**
2009	GNB	1	0	2	6	3.0	4	0	1	-1	-1.0	-1	0
2010	GNB	**4**	0	6	28	**4.7**	13	0	**5**	**64**	**12.8**	**16**	**1**
		7	0	16	68	4.3	18	0	8	77	9.6	16	2

== Post-retirement ==
During mini-camp in 2017, Jackson was an intern running backs coach with the Packers. Over the next three years, he would spend time as a wide receivers coach with Tusculum College, and later as a running backs coach at Austin Peay State University and then Southeast Missouri State University.

In 2022, Jackson became head coach at his high school alma mater, at Horn Lake High School. In their first season under Jackson, the team was a winless 0–10.

Jackson is a Christian.
