= Diyral Briggs =

American football player (born 1985)

No. 50, 53, 59, 47
- Position: Linebacker

Personal information
- Born: October 31, 1985 (age 41); Mount Healthy, Ohio, U.S.
- Listed height: 6 ft 4 in (1.93 m)
- Listed weight: 230 lb (104 kg)

Career information
- High school: Mount Healthy
- College: Bowling Green
- NFL draft: 2009: undrafted

Career history
- San Francisco 49ers (2009–2010); Denver Broncos (2010); Green Bay Packers (2010); Virginia Destroyers (2011); Kansas City Command (2012)*; Kansas City Renegades (2013); Spokane Shock (2013–2014)
- * Offseason or practice squad member only

Awards and highlights
- Super Bowl champion (XLV); UFL champion (2011); 2× First-team All-MAC (2007–2008)

Career NFL statistics
- Total tackles: 6
- Stats at Pro Football Reference

Career AFL statistics
- Total tackles: 46
- Sacks: 10.5
- Forced fumbles: 4
- Stats at ArenaFan.com

Diyral Briggs (born October 31, 1985) is an American former professional football player who was a linebacker in the National Football League (NFL). He played college football for the Bowling Green Falcons before being signed by the San Francisco 49ers as an undrafted free agent in 2009. He was part of the Green Bay Packers' Super Bowl XLV team that beat the Pittsburgh Steelers.

== Professional career ==
=== San Francisco 49ers ===
Briggs was signed by the San Francisco 49ers as an undrafted free agent. He appeared in five games before being released in September.

=== Denver Broncos ===
He was later signed to the Denver Broncos' practice squad and was on the active roster for one game. He was cut by the Broncos on October 25, 2010, and was claimed off waivers by the Green Bay Packers a day later.

=== Green Bay Packers ===
At the end of the 2010 season, Briggs and the Packers appeared in Super Bowl XLV against the Pittsburgh Steelers. In the 31–25 win, he had one total tackle.

He was waived by Green Bay on August 15, 2011.

=== Virginia Destroyers ===
Briggs was signed by the Virginia Destroyers of the United Football League on August 29, 2011.

=== Kansas City Command ===
For the 2012 season, Briggs played for the Kansas City Command of the Arena Football League. He would make 26 tackles, 13 assists, five sacks, two punt blocks, two forced fumbles, and two fumble recoveries that season.

=== Spokane Shock ===
In 2013, Briggs joined the Spokane Shock.

== Professional statistics ==
Legend
| | Won the Super Bowl/UFL championship game |
| **Bold** | Career high |

=== Regular season ===
| Year | Team | Games | | Tackles | | | | | | Interceptions | | | | Fumbles | | | |
| Year | Team | GP | GS | Cmb | Solo | Ast | Sck | TFL | QBH | Int | Yds | TD | PD | FF | FR | Yds | TD |
|---|---|---|---|---|---|---|---|---|---|---|---|---|---|---|---|---|---|
| 2009 | SF | 4 | 0 | 2 | 0 | **2** | 0.0 | 0 | 0 | 0 | 0 | 0 | 0 | 0 | 0 | 0 | 0 |
| 2010 | SF | 1 | 0 | 0 | 0 | 0 | 0.0 | 0 | 0 | 0 | 0 | 0 | 0 | 0 | 0 | 0 | 0 |
| 2010 | DEN | 1 | 0 | 0 | 0 | 0 | 0.0 | 0 | 0 | 0 | 0 | 0 | 0 | 0 | 0 | 0 | 0 |
| 2010 | GB | **5** | 0 | **4** | **4** | 0 | 0.0 | 0 | 0 | 0 | 0 | 0 | 0 | 0 | 0 | 0 | 0 |
| Career | | 11 | 0 | 6 | 4 | 2 | 0.0 | 0 | 0 | 0 | 0 | 0 | 0 | 0 | 0 | 0 | 0 |

=== Postseason ===
| Year | Team | Games | | Tackles | | | | | | Interceptions | | | | Fumbles | | | |
| Year | Team | GP | GS | Cmb | Solo | Ast | Sck | TFL | QBH | Int | Yds | TD | PD | FF | FR | Yds | TD |
|---|---|---|---|---|---|---|---|---|---|---|---|---|---|---|---|---|---|
| 2011 | GB | **4** | 0 | **2** | **1** | **1** | 0.0 | 0 | 0 | 0 | 0 | 0 | 0 | 0 | 0 | 0 | 0 |
| Career | | 4 | 0 | 2 | 1 | 1 | 0.0 | 0 | 0 | 0 | 0 | 0 | 0 | 0 | 0 | 0 | 0 |

=== UFL regular season ===
| Year | Team | Games | | Tackles | | | | | | Interceptions | | | | Fumbles | | | |
| Year | Team | GP | GS | Cmb | Solo | Ast | Sck | TFL | QBH | Int | Yds | TD | PD | FF | FR | Yds | TD |
|---|---|---|---|---|---|---|---|---|---|---|---|---|---|---|---|---|---|
| 2011 | VA | 4 | 0 | 4.5 | 4 | 1 | 1.0 | 1 | 1 | 0 | 0 | 0 | 0 | 0 | 1 | 0 | 0 |
| UFL Career | | 4 | 0 | 4.5 | 4 | 1 | 1.0 | 1 | 1 | 0 | 0 | 0 | 0 | 0 | 1 | 0 | 0 |

=== AFL regular season ===
| Year | Team | Games | Tackles | | | | Interceptions | | | | Fumbles | | | |
| Year | Team | GP | Tot | Solo | Ast | Sck | Int | Yds | TD | PD | FF | FR | Yds | TD |
|---|---|---|---|---|---|---|---|---|---|---|---|---|---|---|
| 2012 | Kansas City | 14 | 32.5 | 26 | 13 | 5.0 | 0 | 0 | 0 | 2 | 2 | 2 | 0 | 0 |
| 2013 | Spokane | 9 | 12.5 | 10 | 5 | 4.0 | 0 | 0 | 0 | 0 | 2 | 1 | 0 | 0 |
| 2014 | Spokane | 12 | 19 | 10 | 18 | 1.5 | 1 | 9 | 0 | 0 | 0 | 2 | 0 | 0 |
| AFL Career | | 35 | 64 | 46 | 36 | 10.5 | 1 | 9 | 0 | 2 | 4 | 5 | 0 | 0 |
