= C. J. Wilson (defensive end) =

American football player (born 1987)

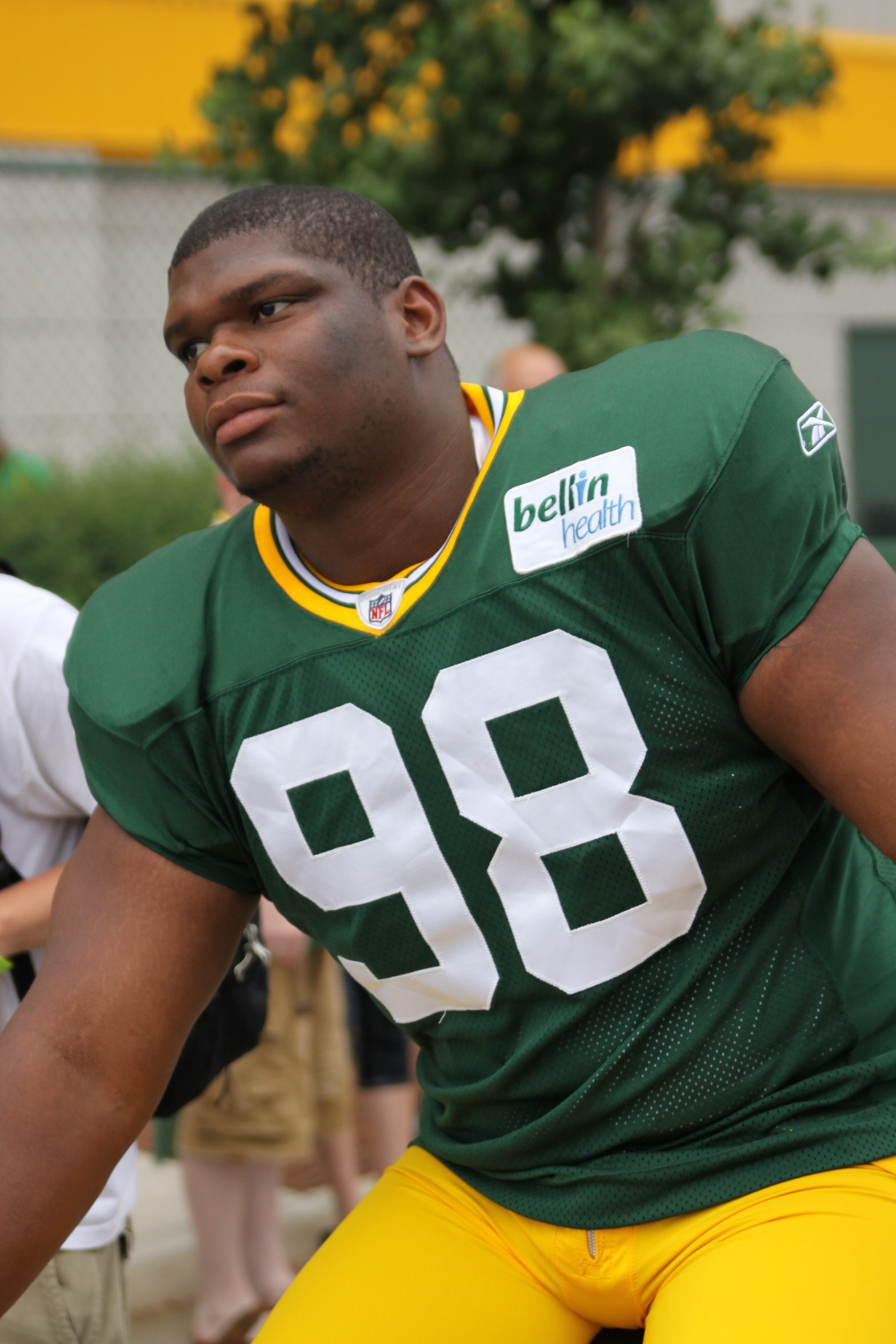
- Wilson with the Green Bay Packers in 2011

No. 98, 78, 69
- Position: Defensive end

Personal information
- Born: March 30, 1987 (age 39); Belhaven, North Carolina, U.S.
- Listed height: 6 ft 3 in (1.91 m)
- Listed weight: 290 lb (132 kg)

Career information
- High school: Northside (Pinetown, North Carolina)
- College: East Carolina
- NFL draft: 2010: 7th round, 230th overall pick

Career history
- Green Bay Packers (2010–2013); Oakland Raiders (2014–2015); Detroit Lions (2015); New Orleans Saints (2016)*; Chicago Bears (2016)
- * Offseason or practice squad member only

Awards and highlights
- Super Bowl champion (XLV); Conference-USA Defensive Player of the Year; First-team All-C-USA (2009)

Career NFL statistics
- Total tackles: 124
- Sacks: 7.5
- Fumble recoveries: 1
- Stats at Pro Football Reference

Clifford James Wilson (born March 30, 1987) is an American former professional football player who was a defensive end in the National Football League (NFL). He played college football for the East Carolina Pirates. Wilson was selected by the Green Bay Packers in the seventh round of the 2010 NFL draft and would win Super Bowl XLV with the team over the Pittsburgh Steelers. He has also played for the Oakland Raiders, Detroit Lions, New Orleans Saints, and Chicago Bears.

== Early life ==
Wilson was born in Belhaven, North Carolina and attended Northside High School in Pinetown, North Carolina. He played numerous positions during his early career including linebacker, cornerback, safety, running back, tackle, and fullback. He played a major role in the Northside Panthers 13–3 record and advancement into the Eastern Championship. Additionally, he earned all-conference honors during his senior year and was also a team captain. He also lettered in basketball and track.

Wilson was ranked as a two star by Scout.com and was measured at six foot four inches and he weighed 218 pounds. He received only one scholarship offer from East Carolina University.

== College career ==
Wilson chose to play for East Carolina, but after completing his eligibility requirements he was forced to join in the spring of 2005. As a true freshman in 2006, Wilson recorded at least one sack in five of eight games. The first sack of his college career came against Tulsa on October 14. Additionally, he recorded a season high seven tackles in the same game. At the end of the season, Wilson lead the team with four quarterback sacks.

In 2007, Wilson was projected to be a reserve defensive linemen who was still going to find a way be on the field. This proved to be the case, as Wilson took the starting job from Marcus Hand's after four games and played in the remainder of the games that season. He had the statistically best game of his career at ECU against the Houston Cougars with nine stops, two and a half sacks, and 2.5 tackles for a loss. Additionally, he also blocked a kick. At the end of the season, Wilson earned all-Conference USA (second-team) honors as a selection by the league coaches.

During his junior year, Wilson started all 14 games and extended his streak of starts to 23. He had at least one sack in nine games of fifteen. During a game against Tulane, he had a season high eight tackles. Wilson finished the season ranked 27th in the nation and second in the Conference-USA in sacks. Additionally, Wilson also ranked first in the Conference-USA for tackles for a loss. He was named defensive conference player of the year by ESPN and Sporting news, and also earned a first-team Conference-USA spot on Phil Steele's All Americans.

In his final year as a Pirate, Wilson again started all 14 games of the season and finished up his career with 37 straight starts. He finished the season with 57 tackles (23 solo), 10 1/2 for a loss, and 5 1/2 sacks. His performance again earned him Conference-USA defensive player of the year. He was also named to the Ted Hendricks, 40th Annual Rotary Lombardi, and Bronko Nagurski award watch lists. Wilson graduated from college in 2010 with a degree in communication.

== Professional career ==
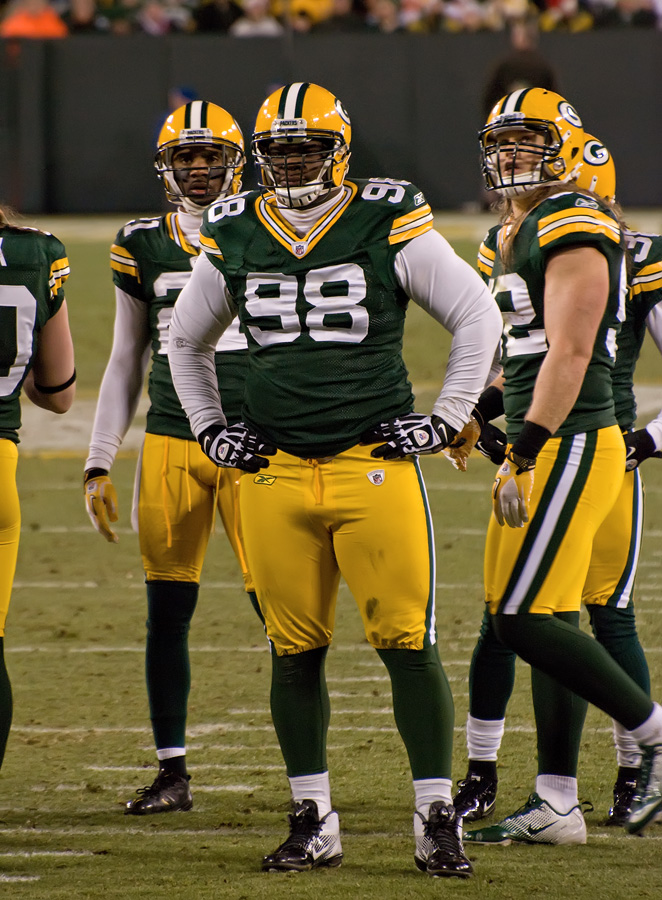
C. J. Wilson, Charles Woodson and Clay Matthews on December 25, 2011.

Wilson had 32 reps during the bench press drills during the combine. Scouts raved that he was an "instinctive" players who had good rushing skills and speed when rushing the passer. Scouts also expressed concerns with his average lateral agility. and noted that he didn't appear comfortable playing in space. He was believed to be a good match to add depth as a 3–4 defensive end.

=== Green Bay Packers ===
Wilson was selected in the seventh round (230th overall) by the Green Bay Packers. He became the first player ever drafted out of East Carolina University by the Green Bay Packers. On June 23, 2010, he signed a contract with the Packers.

At the end of the 2010 season, Wilson and the Packers appeared in Super Bowl XLV. He was a starter in the 31–25 victory over the Pittsburgh Steelers.

=== Oakland Raiders ===
On March 28, 2014, Wilson signed a one-year, $795,000 contract with the Oakland Raiders. On March 25, 2015, Wilson signed a new contract with the Raiders. The Raiders did not officially announce the signing until Wilson's birthday on March 30, 2015. On November 7, 2015, he was waived by the Raiders.

=== Detroit Lions ===
After going unclaimed on waivers, on November 9, 2015, Wilson signed a one-year, $745,000 contract with the Detroit Lions. During the 2015 season, Wilson played in the last eight games of the season and recorded eight tackles and a sack. He was released by the Lions on February 19, 2016.

=== New Orleans Saints ===
On June 24, 2016, Wilson signed with the New Orleans Saints. On September 3, 2016, he was released by the Saints.

=== Chicago Bears ===
On September 27, 2016, Wilson signed with the Chicago Bears. He was released on October 1, 2016. He was re-signed on October 3, 2016, and was released again on October 8. He was re-signed again on November 15, 2016.

On March 20, 2017, Wilson re-signed with the Bears. He was released on September 2, 2017.

== NFL career statistics ==
Legend
**Bold**	Career high

=== Regular season ===
Year	Team	Games		Tackles					Interceptions					Fumbles			
Year	Team	GP	GS	Cmb	Solo	Ast	Sck	TFL	Int	Yds	TD	Lng	PD	FF	FR	Yds	TD
2010	GNB	15	2	19	13	6	1.0	2	0	0	0	0	0	0	0	0	0
2011	GNB	**16**	2	**26**	**20**	6	0.0	3	0	0	0	0	0	0	0	0	0
2012	GNB	11	**7**	24	15	**9**	**2.5**	3	0	0	0	0	**1**	0	0	0	0
2013	GNB	8	0	8	5	3	0.0	1	0	0	0	0	0	0	0	0	0
2014	OAK	**16**	**7**	23	16	7	2.0	**4**	0	0	0	0	0	0	**1**	**21**	0
2015	OAK	4	1	3	3	0	0.0	0	0	0	0	0	0	0	0	0	0
2015	DET	8	0	8	6	2	1.0	2	0	0	0	0	0	0	0	0	0
2016	CHI	6	1	13	9	4	1.0	2	0	0	0	0	0	0	0	0	0
Career		84	20	124	87	37	7.5	17	0	0	0	0	1	0	1	21	0

=== Playoffs ===
Year	Team	Games		Tackles					Interceptions					Fumbles			
Year	Team	GP	GS	Cmb	Solo	Ast	Sck	TFL	Int	Yds	TD	Lng	PD	FF	FR	Yds	TD
2010	GNB	**4**	1	5	4	1	**1.0**	**1**	0	0	0	0	0	0	0	0	0
2011	GNB	1	0	3	2	1	0.0	0	0	0	0	0	0	0	0	0	0
2012	GNB	2	**2**	**9**	**6**	**3**	0.0	0	0	0	0	0	0	0	0	0	0
2013	GNB	1	0	0	0	0	0.0	0	0	0	0	0	0	0	0	0	0
Career		8	3	17	12	5	1.0	1	0	0	0	0	0	0	0	0	0
