= Daryn Colledge =

American football player (born 1982)

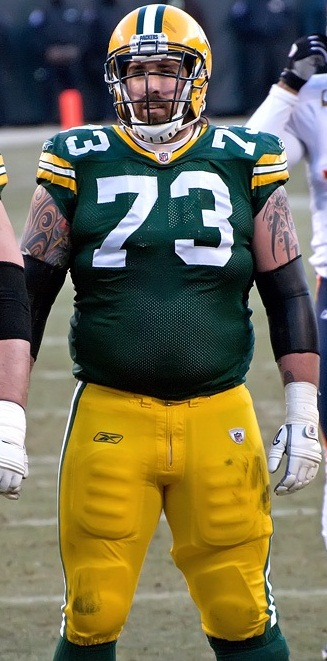
- Colledge with the Green Bay Packers in 2011

No. 67, 71, 73
- Position: Guard

Personal information
- Born: February 11, 1982 (age 44); Fairbanks, Alaska, U.S.
- Listed height: 6 ft 4 in (1.93 m)
- Listed weight: 308 lb (140 kg)

Career information
- High school: North Pole (AK)
- College: Boise State (2001–2005)
- NFL draft: 2006: 2nd round, 47th overall pick

Career history
- Green Bay Packers (2006–2010); Arizona Cardinals (2011–2013); Miami Dolphins (2014)

Awards and highlights
- Super Bowl champion (XLV); PFWA All-Rookie Team (2006)

Career NFL statistics
- Games played: 141
- Games started: 137
- Fumble recoveries: 3
- Stats at Pro Football Reference

Daryn Wayne Colledge (born February 11, 1982) is an American former professional football player who was an offensive guard for nine seasons in the National Football League (NFL). He played college football for the Boise State Broncos. Colledge was selected in the second round of the 2006 NFL draft by the Green Bay Packers and won Super Bowl XLV with them over the Pittsburgh Steelers. He then played for the Arizona Cardinals and Miami Dolphins.

== Early life ==
Born in Fairbanks, Alaska, Colledge grew up in nearby North Pole. He graduated from North Pole High School and was a first-team all-state defensive lineman for the Patriots.

== College career ==
Colledge played college football at Boise State University, then in the Western Athletic Conference (WAC). A four-year starter for the Broncos under head coach Dan Hawkins, he was a two-time All-WAC selection and College Football News All-American in 2004 and 2005, and was second-team in 2003 as a sophomore. Colledge was one of the 38 former Boise State players that have been drafted into the NFL since 2000. In college, Colledge played as an offensive tackle for the Boise State Broncos.

== Professional career ==
Pre-draft measurables
Height	Weight	Arm length	Hand span	40-yard dash	10-yard split	20-yard split	20-yard shuttle	Three-cone drill	Vertical jump	Broad jump	Bench press
6 ft 4 3/8 in (1.94 m)	299 lb (136 kg)	33 in (0.84 m)	9 1/2 in (0.24 m)	5.04 s	1.70 s	2.87 s	4.58 s	7.43 s	32.5 in (0.83 m)	9 ft 2 in (2.79 m)	22 reps
All values from NFL Combine/Pro Day

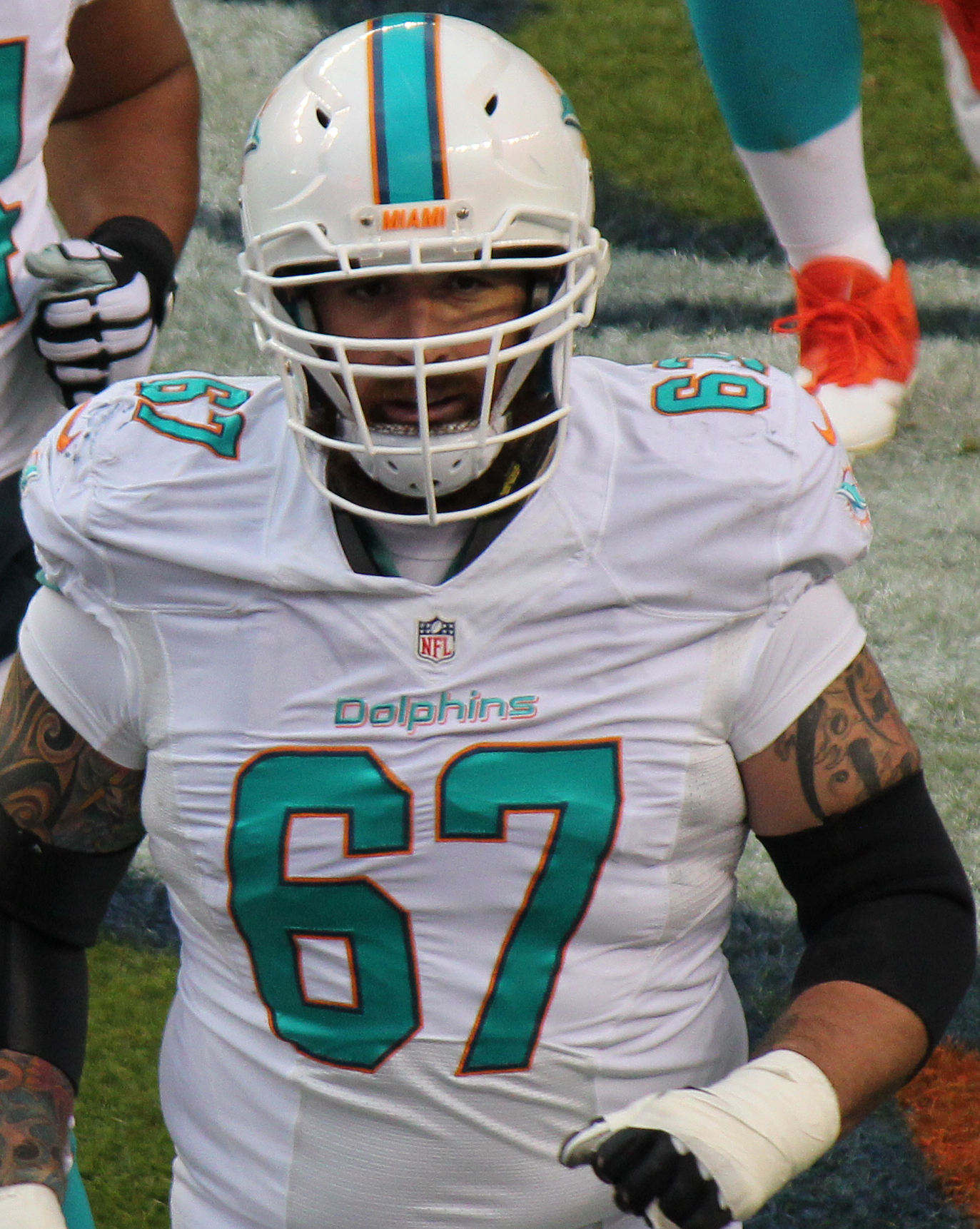
Colledge with the Miami Dolphins

=== Green Bay Packers ===
Colledge was selected by the Packers in the second round (47th overall) of the 2006 NFL draft, the highest-ever selection from the state of Alaska. He transitioned from playing offensive tackle at Boise State to playing offensive guard for the Green Bay Packers. During his fifth and final season in Green Bay in 2010, the Packers won Super Bowl XLV, beating the Pittsburgh Steelers by a score of 31–25. Following the game, he became an unrestricted free agent.

=== Arizona Cardinals ===
On July 29, 2011, Colledge announced on his Twitter page that he and the Arizona Cardinals agreed to a five-year contract, and he played three seasons with the team.

On March 8, 2014, Arizona told Colledge he would be released into free agency on Tuesday, March 11. By waiting, the Cardinals were able to spread the cap charge of releasing Colledge over a period of two years.

=== Miami Dolphins ===
On June 30, 2014, the Miami Dolphins acquired Daryn Colledge through free agency, signing him to a one-year contract worth $2 million. He got a guaranteed $250,000 at the time of his signing.

After the 2014 season, Colledge retired from professional football.

== Personal life ==
On March 22, 2016, Colledge announced that he enlisted in the Idaho Army National Guard.

During his time in the National Guard he flew Black Hawk UH 60 Helicopter and served on one tour in Afghanistan.

After finishing his term with the Idaho Army National Guard, Colledge returned to his alma mater (Boise State) and was named as director of development and Varsity B coordinator in November 2021.
