= Robert Francois =

American football player (born 1985)

No. 49
- Position: Linebacker

Personal information
- Born: May 14, 1985 (age 41); Houston, Texas, U.S.
- Listed height: 6 ft 2 in (1.88 m)
- Listed weight: 255 lb (116 kg)

Career information
- High school: Baytown (TX) Sterling; The Governor's Academy (MA)
- College: Boston College
- NFL draft: 2009: undrafted

Career history
- Minnesota Vikings (2009)*; Detroit Lions (2009)*; Green Bay Packers (2009–2013)
- * Offseason or practice squad member only

Awards and highlights
- Super Bowl champion (XLV)

Career NFL statistics
- Total tackles: 36
- Forced fumbles: 2
- Interceptions: 2
- Stats at Pro Football Reference

Robert Joseph Francois (born May 14, 1985) is an American former professional football player who was a linebacker in the National Football League (NFL). He played for the Green Bay Packers, who won Super Bowl XLV against the Pittsburgh Steelers. He was signed by the Minnesota Vikings as an undrafted free agent in 2009 and was also a member of the Detroit Lions that same preseason. He played college football for the Boston College Eagles.

== Early life ==
Francois played wide receiver, tight end and safety for Governor Dummer Academy. As a senior, he gained Team MVP and All-New England honors. He was a two-time All-Independent League first-team selection and played in the 2004 Massachusetts Shriners Football Classic. Francois also excelled on GDA's basketball and track teams. In multiple years he won the New England Prep School 100-meter, 200-meter, 4x100-meter, and 4x400-meter titles. His fastest time in the 100-meter was a 10.8 and in the 200-meter was a 22.3. Before attending GDA, Francois went to Ross Sterling High School in Baytown, Texas where after his sophomore year he decided to leave to prep school on a scholarship. This decision was made to get a deserving starting role and not have to deal with the politics of the booster club affecting coaches decision on who got on the field at Sterling.

== College career ==
After redshirting at Boston College in 2004, Francois played in all twelve games in 2005. He registered 28 tackles (16 solos), 2.0 tackles for loss, one fumble recovery, making at least one tackle in every game. His first collegiate action came during the season opener at Brigham Young and made his first tackle late in the first quarter. He finished the game with one unassisted tackle and one assisted. He made one solo tackle against Boise State in the MPC Computers Bowl.

Francois played in all thirteen games in 2006, starting in seven. He had 52 tackles, 29 solo stops, 3.5 tackles for loss, and recovered three fumbles. He had four tackles (two solo) against Navy in the Meineke Car Care Bowl.

In 2007, after suffering a high ankle sprain in camp Francois was out for 4 weeks and lost his starting position dealing with a nagging injury for the majority of the season. Francois finished the 2007 season with 39 total tackles (26 solos), 2 tackles for loss, and 0.5 sacks in thirteen games. He made five tackles (three solo) and including an assist on a tackle-for-loss against Virginia Tech in the ACC Championship. He registered 3 solo tackles in BC's win over Michigan State in the Champs Sports Bowl.

In 2008, his senior season, Francois was a team leader and again lost his starting position due to missed time in camp from a bone bruise on his knee. He was a starting ILB who was not starting due to politics by the current coaching staff at the time, but he was given his deserved starting position after Brian Toal broke his leg. The defense fed off Francois' production where he dominated when he was in the game. He was part of the linebacker culture that changed BC's attitude and dominance in the ACC.

== Professional career ==
=== Minnesota Vikings ===
After going undrafted in the 2009 NFL draft, Francois was signed by the Minnesota Vikings as an undrafted free agent. He dealt with a hamstring injury early on in camp coming back and playing in the first two preseason games. Vikings LB Coach at the time Fred Pagac was surprised when Francois was waived on August 18 to make a roster place for the team to sign quarterback Brett Favre.

=== Detroit Lions ===
Francois was claimed off waivers the following day by the Detroit Lions on August 19, 2009, where he was there by less than two weeks. He was waived on August 30 before the last preseason game.

=== Green Bay Packers ===
Francois was signed to the Green Bay Packers practice squad December 7, 2009. On January 11, 2010, Francois signed a reserve/future contract. On October 13, 2010, he was promoted to the active roster due to the injuries of Nick Barnett and Brandon Chillar. Francois was released on November 9, 2010, but re-added to the practice squad on November 15. Francois was then reactivated for the December 5, 2010 game and remained on Packers active roster for the rest of his career starting against the New York Giants and stepping up in the NFC Championship game against the Chicago Bears in 2010, helping gain a ticket to Super Bowl XLV. He then played in his home state of Texas and helped the Green Bay Packers win Super Bowl XLV.

On March 15, 2013, Francois re-signed with the Packers on a one-year deal. He tore his achilles after sustaining an unknown strained calf earlier in the season.
