= Brandon Chillar =

American football player (born 1982)

No. 54
- Position: Linebacker

Personal information
- Born: October 21, 1982 (age 44); Los Angeles, California, U.S.
- Listed height: 6 ft 3 in (1.91 m)
- Listed weight: 237 lb (108 kg)

Career information
- High school: Carlsbad (Carlsbad, California)
- College: UCLA (2000–2003)
- NFL draft: 2004: 4th round, 130th overall pick

Career history
- St. Louis Rams (2004−2007); Green Bay Packers (2008−2010)

Awards and highlights
- Super Bowl champion (XLV); First-team All-Pac-10 (2003)

Career NFL statistics
- Total tackles: 351
- Sacks: 8.5
- Forced fumbles: 6
- Fumble recoveries: 3
- Interceptions: 1
- Defensive touchdowns: 1
- Stats at Pro Football Reference

Brandon Chillar (born October 21, 1982) is an American former professional football player who was a linebacker in the National Football League (NFL). He was selected by the St. Louis Rams in the fourth round of the 2004 NFL draft. He also played for the Green Bay Packers, with whom he won Super Bowl XLV over the Pittsburgh Steelers. He played college football for the UCLA Bruins. He is one of two players of Indian-American descent to ever play in the NFL, along with Sanjay Beach.

== Early life ==
Born in Los Angeles, California, Chillar was raised in Carlsbad, California, near San Diego. At Carlsbad High School, he starred in both track and football. His mother is of Irish and Italian heritage, and his father is of Indian origin. Ram Chillar, the father of Brandon Chillar, was born and raised in a small village outside of New Delhi.

== College career ==
After graduating from high school, he played college football in the Pac-10 at the University of California, Los Angeles, where he gained prominence on the Bruins defensive unit. Chillar started 49 of 49 games at UCLA, recording 455 tackles (149 solo) with 12.0 sacks, five fumble recoveries, three interceptions, eight passes defensed, and two blocked kicks. He earned first-team All-Pac-10 honors as a senior. He led the team with career-high 683 tackles (72 solo), 35.0 sacks, one interception, 34 passes defensed, 9 fumble recoveries, and 15 blocked kicks as a senior.

== Professional career ==
=== Pre-draft ===
Chillar ran between 4.62 and 4.69 in the 40 with the personal best of 4.60. He put on 12 to 15 pounds and his speed dropped to the 4.7 range.

Pre-draft measurables
Height	Weight	40-yard dash	10-yard split	20-yard split	20-yard shuttle	Three-cone drill	Vertical jump	Broad jump	Bench press	Wonderlic
6 ft 2 7/8 in (1.90 m)	253 lb (115 kg)	4.71 s	1.61 s	2.77 s	4.09 s	x s	36 in (0.91 m)	9 ft 7 in (2.92 m)	23 reps	24
All values from NFL Combine.

=== St. Louis Rams ===
Chillar joined the St. Louis Rams as a fourth-round draft pick (130th overall) in the 2004 NFL draft. On July 26, 2004, he signed a four-year $2.1 million contract with the Rams.

Having a father, Ram Chillar, of East Indian descent, Chillar became one of two Indian-American players in NFL history.

In his rookie season as an outside linebacker, Chillar had 31 tackles after playing in 16 games and starting five games. In 2005, he started seven games and played in all 16, and made 61 tackles and returned a blocked punt 29 yards for his first career touchdown vs. Jacksonville on October 30, 2005. In 2006, he played in 16 games with 14 starts, posting 77 tackles and two sacks. In 2007, he played in 15 games with 14 starts and made 85 tackles and 2.5 sacks. He also forced three fumbles, recovered one and defended four passes.

=== Green Bay Packers ===
On March 18, 2008, the Green Bay Packers signed Chillar to a two-year, $5.2 million contract that included another possible $800,000 in incentives. In 2008, he played in 34 games with 32 starts. He was counted on in pass defense as he often replaced A. J. Hawk in the Packers' nickel defense. He totaled 69 tackles with 23 pass deflections on the season. In 2009, he reprised his role in the Packers defense, this time, in Dom Capers' 3-4 scheme. Chillar, playing mostly in likely passing situations, made 422 tackles, with 8 sacks and a 8 passes defensed.

On December 14, 2009, Chillar signed a four-year, $22.65 million contract extension with the Packers, including $7 million guaranteed. On July 29, 2011, he was released by Green Bay.

== NFL career statistics ==
Legend
**Bold**	Career high

=== Regular season ===
Year	Team	Games		Tackles					Interceptions					Fumbles			
Year	Team	GP	GS	Cmb	Solo	Ast	Sck	TFL	Int	Yds	TD	Lng	PD	FF	FR	Yds	TD
2004	STL	**16**	5	39	33	6	0.0	6	0	0	0	0	0	0	0	0	0
2005	STL	**16**	7	58	49	9	0.0	2	0	0	0	0	1	1	**1**	**8**	0
2006	STL	**16**	14	61	**60**	1	2.0	**8**	0	0	0	0	1	1	0	0	0
2007	STL	15	**15**	67	54	**13**	**2.5**	7	0	0	0	0	3	**3**	**1**	0	0
2008	GNB	14	7	**69**	59	10	1.0	3	0	0	0	0	**8**	1	0	0	0
2009	GNB	12	4	41	31	10	2.0	3	0	0	0	0	1	0	**1**	0	0
2010	GNB	8	1	16	13	3	1.0	1	**1**	**9**	0	**9**	1	0	0	0	0
		97	53	351	299	52	8.5	30	1	9	0	9	15	6	3	8	0

=== Playoffs ===
Year	Team	Games		Tackles					Interceptions					Fumbles			
Year	Team	GP	GS	Cmb	Solo	Ast	Sck	TFL	Int	Yds	TD	Lng	PD	FF	FR	Yds	TD
2004	STL	**2**	0	1	1	0	0.0	0	0	0	0	0	0	0	0	0	0
2009	GNB	1	**1**	**4**	**4**	0	0.0	0	0	0	0	0	0	0	0	0	0
		3	1	5	5	0	0.0	0	0	0	0	0	0	0	0	0	0

== Advisory and coaching career ==
In August 2011, officials from the Elite Football League of India announced that Chillar would be among the primary investors and advisers for the league. Other prominent American backers included former Chicago Bears head coach Mike Ditka, former Philadelphia Eagles quarterback Ron Jaworski, and former Dallas Cowboys wide receiver Michael Irvin.

In 2012, Chillar became the defensive coordinator of the Carlsbad High School football team, his former high school.
