= Noah Shepard =

American football player (born 1986)

No. 6
- Position: Quarterback

Personal information
- Born: December 31, 1986 (age 39)
- Listed height: 6 ft 2 in (1.88 m)
- Listed weight: 223 lb (101 kg)

Career information
- College: South Dakota
- NFL draft: 2010: undrafted

Career history
- Green Bay Packers (2010)*
- * Offseason or practice squad member only

Noah Shepard (born December 31, 1986) is an American former football quarterback. He played college football at South Dakota. Shepard was signed by the Green Bay Packers as an undrafted free agent in 2010.

== College career ==
Shepard was a four-year starter at South Dakota. He finished his career as the most decorated passer in Coyotes history with school records in passing yards (8,936), passing touchdowns (77) and total offense (11,133). His 36 rushing touchdowns ranks second in school history.

== Professional career ==
After going undrafted in the 2010 NFL draft, Shepard signed with the Green Bay Packers on April 30, 2010. On July 18, 2010, he was released by the Packers.
