= Curtis Young =

American football player (born 1987)

No. 93, 2
- Position: Defensive end/linebacker

Personal information
- Born: January 8, 1987 (age 39)
- Listed height: 6 ft 2 in (1.88 m)
- Listed weight: 290 lb (132 kg)

Career information
- High school: Cleveland (OH) Glenville
- College: Cincinnati
- NFL draft: 2010: undrafted

Career history
- Sacramento Mountain Lions (2010); Green Bay Packers (2010–2011)*; Cleveland Gladiators (2012); Pittsburgh Power (2013–2014); Philadelphia Soul (2015); Cleveland Gladiators (2015–2016); Washington Valor (2019)
- * Offseason or practice squad member only

Awards and highlights
- Super Bowl champion (XLV)

Career AFL statistics
- Total tackles: 85.5
- Sacks: 10
- Forced fumbles: 6
- Pass deflections: 2
- Stats at ArenaFan.com

Curtis Young (born January 8, 1987) is an American former professional football defensive end. He was a member of the Sacramento Mountain Lions, Green Bay Packers, Cleveland Gladiators, Pittsburgh Power, Philadelphia Soul, and Washington Valor.

== Career ==
On March 24, 2015, Young was assigned to the Philadelphia Soul on a 1-year deal. On May 26, 2015, Young was placed on recallable reassignment by the Soul. On June 3, 2015, Young was assigned to the Cleveland Gladiators. The Gladiators placed Young on reassignment on July 8, 2015.On March 10, 2016, Young was assigned to the Gladiators. On July 26, 2016, Young was placed on reassignment.
