= Anthony Levine =

American football player (born 1987)

Anthony Levine Sr.
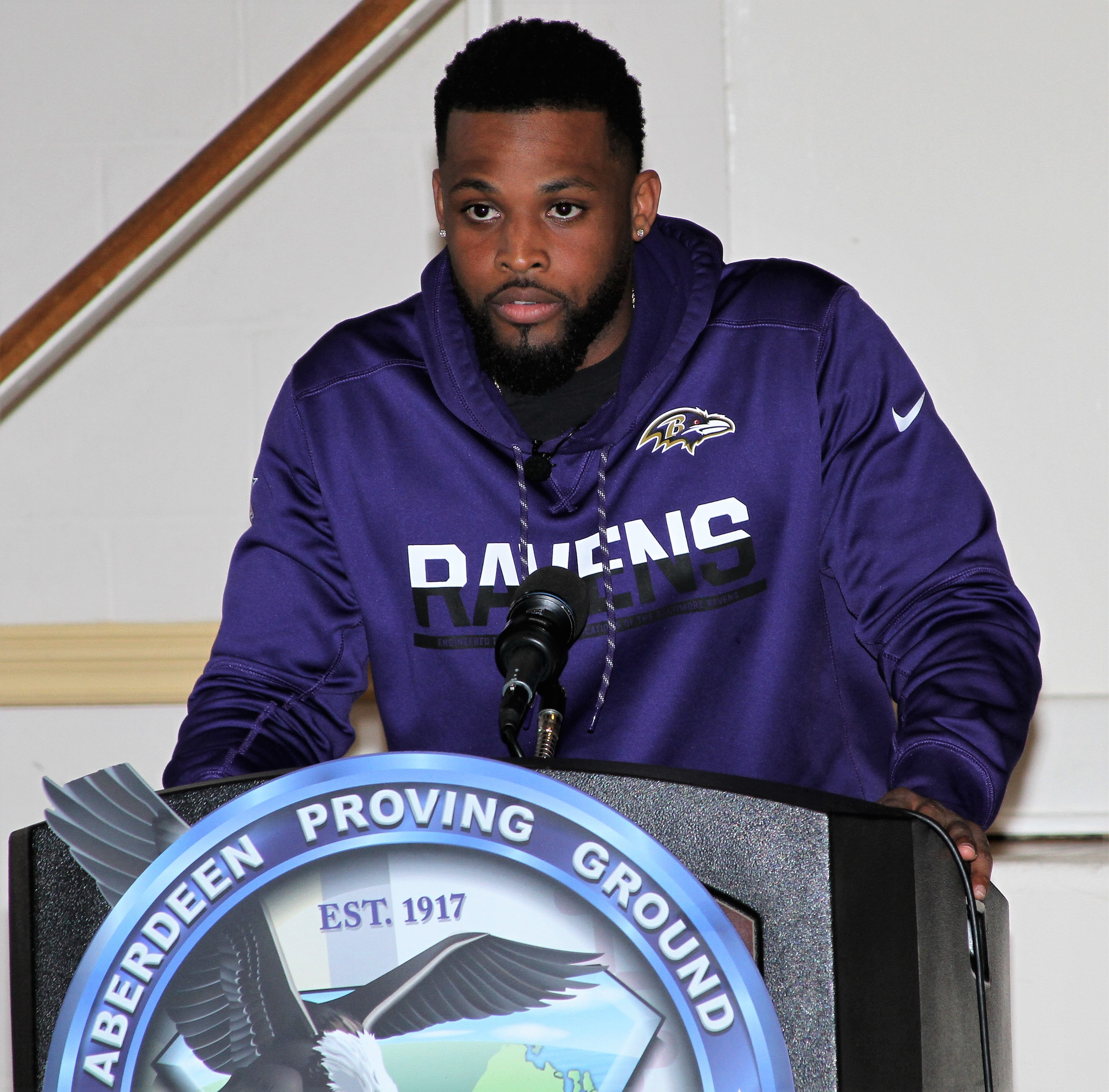
- Levine in 2019

Baltimore Ravens
- Title: Special teams coordinator

Personal information
- Born: March 27, 1987 (age 39); Abbeville, Louisiana, U.S.
- Listed height: 5 ft 11 in (1.80 m)
- Listed weight: 207 lb (94 kg)

Career information
- Position: Safety (No. 41)
- High school: R. J. Reynolds (Winston-Salem, North Carolina)
- College: Tennessee State
- NFL draft: 2010: undrafted

Career history

Playing
- Green Bay Packers (2010–2012)*; Baltimore Ravens (2012–2021)
- * Offseason or practice squad member only

Coaching
- Baltimore Ravens (2022) Player personnel & coaching assistant; Tennessee Titans (2023–2024) Assistant special teams coach; Baltimore Ravens (2025–present); Assistant special teams coach (2025); Special teams coordinator (2026–present)

Awards and highlights
- As a player: 2× Super Bowl champion (XLV, XLVII)

Career NFL statistics
- Total tackles: 149
- Sacks: 4
- Pass deflections: 16
- Interceptions: 2
- Forced fumbles: 1
- Fumble recoveries: 4
- Stats at Pro Football Reference

Anthony Levine Sr. (born March 27, 1987), nicknamed "Co-Cap", is an American professional football coach and former player who is the special teams coordinator for the Baltimore Ravens of the National Football League (NFL). He played safety in the NFL for twelve seasons. Levine played college football for the Tennessee State Tigers.

== Early life ==
Levine spent the first 14 years of his life in Abbeville, Louisiana. He then moved to North Carolina where he played football, basketball, and track while he attended Richard J. Reynolds High School in Winston-Salem. Levine helped the Reynolds Track Team win the North Carolina State Championship his senior year.

== Professional career ==
Pre-draft measurables
Height	Weight	40-yard dash	10-yard split	20-yard split	20-yard shuttle	Three-cone drill	Vertical jump	Broad jump	Bench press
5 ft 11 1/8 in (1.81 m)	193 lb (88 kg)	4.48 s	1.53 s	2.53 s	4.05 s	6.75 s	35.0 in (0.89 m)	9 ft 6 in (2.90 m)	20 reps
All values from Pro Day

=== Green Bay Packers ===
Levine was signed by the Packers as an undrafted free agent on May 3, 2010. Levine spent two seasons on the Packers' practice squad before being released during 2012 roster cuts.

=== Baltimore Ravens ===
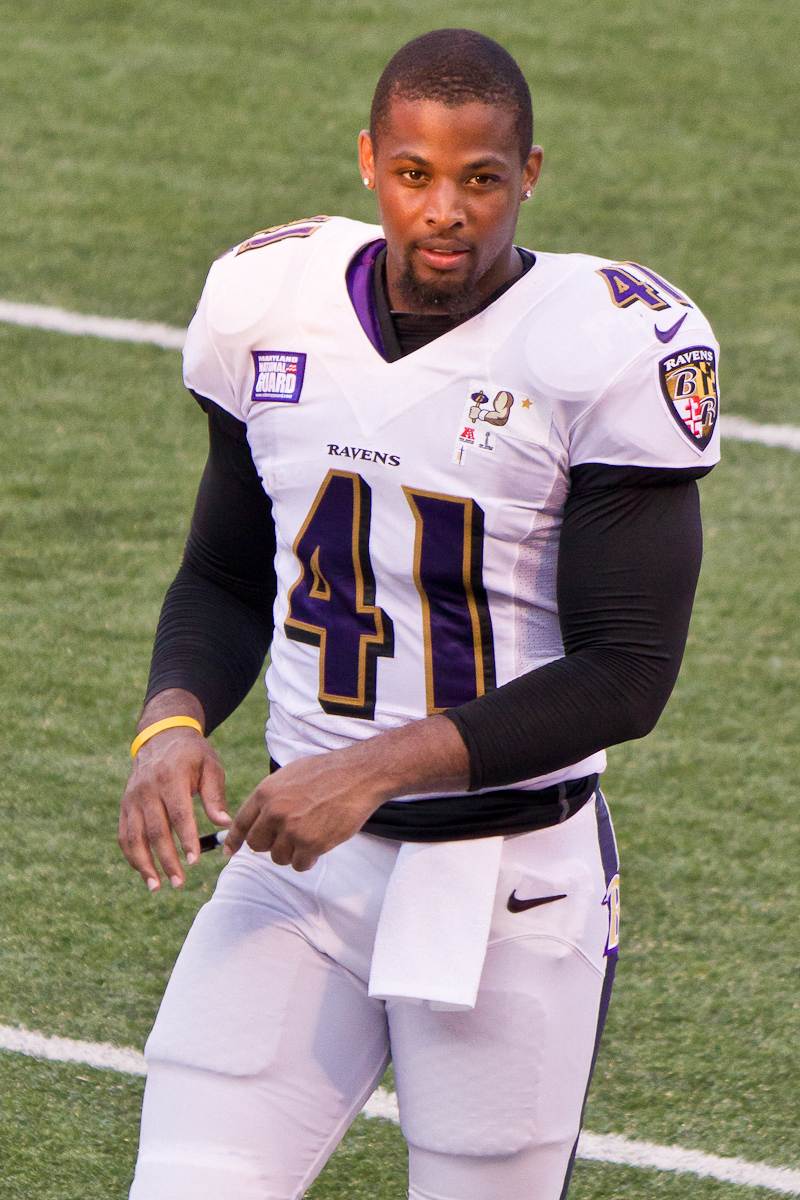
Levine with the Ravens in 2013

Levine was signed to the Ravens' practice squad on September 3, 2012 and was promoted to the active roster on November 17. He was placed on injured reserve on November 26 after appearing in two games and recording one special teams tackle.

In 2013, Levine played in all 16 games finishing second on the team with 11 special teams tackles. In 2014, Levine played in all 16 games with three starts playing at both safety and cornerback recording 23 tackles and four passes defensed.

Levine signed a two-year $2.4 million contract extension with the Ravens on March 12, 2015.

On March 10, 2017, Levine signed a three-year contract extension with the Ravens. He played in all 16 games in 2017, recording 29 combined tackles, three pass deflections, and his first career interception. In 2018, Levine played in all 16 games, recording 28 combined tackles, an interception, and a career-high eight pass deflections. In the 2019 regular season opener, Levine took a fake punt for a 60-yard carry in the 59–10 victory over the Miami Dolphins. In the 2019 season, Levine appeared in all 16 games and recorded eight total tackles, one tackle-for-loss, and three quarterback hits to go along with contributing on special teams.

On March 26, 2020, Levine re-signed with the Ravens.

Levine re-signed on a one-year contract with the team again on April 9, 2021.

On January 26, 2022, Levine announced his retirement through the Ravens' social media channels. Levine also announced that he would be taking up a scouting and coaching assistant role with the Ravens. He is the Ravens all-time leader in special teams tackles with the franchise.

== Coaching career ==
=== Tennessee Titans ===
On March 31, 2023, the Tennessee Titans hired Levine as an assistant special teams coach. On January 27, 2025, it was announced that Levine and the Titans would be parting ways.

=== Baltimore Ravens ===
On February 15, 2025, the Baltimore Ravens hired Levine to serve as their assistant special teams coach under special teams coordinator, Chris Horton. On February 10, 2026, the Ravens promoted Levine to special teams coordinator after Horton chose to leave the team and join John Harbaugh with the New York Giants.

== NFL career statistics ==
Legend
**Bold**	Career high

=== Regular season ===
Year	Team	Games		Tackles					Interceptions					Fumbles			
Year	Team	GP	GS	Cmb	Solo	Ast	Sck	TFL	Int	Yds	TD	Lng	PD	FF	FR	Yds	TD
2012	BAL	2	0	1	1	0	0.0	0	0	0	0	0	0	0	0	0	0
2013	BAL	16	0	11	10	1	0.0	0	0	0	0	0	0	0	0	0	0
2014	BAL	16	**3**	**29**	21	**8**	0.0	0	0	0	0	0	3	0	0	0	0
2015	BAL	16	0	7	7	0	0.0	0	0	0	0	0	0	**1**	1	0	0
2016	BAL	16	0	11	7	4	0.0	0	0	0	0	0	1	0	0	0	0
2017	BAL	16	0	**29**	**23**	6	**3.0**	**3**	**1**	8	0	8	3	0	1	0	0
2018	BAL	16	0	28	**23**	5	1.0	1	**1**	**16**	0	**16**	**8**	0	0	0	0
2019	BAL	16	0	14	12	2	0.0	1	0	0	0	0	0	0	0	0	0
2020	BAL	15	1	7	4	3	0.0	0	0	0	0	0	0	0	**2**	**1**	0
2021	BAL	**17**	1	12	9	3	0.0	0	0	0	0	0	1	0	0	0	0
		146	5	149	117	32	4.0	5	2	24	0	16	16	1	4	1	0

=== Playoffs ===
Year	Team	Games		Tackles					Interceptions					Fumbles			
Year	Team	GP	GS	Cmb	Solo	Ast	Sck	TFL	Int	Yds	TD	Lng	PD	FF	FR	Yds	TD
2012	BAL	0	0	Did not play due to injury													
2014	BAL	**2**	0	**4**	**3**	**1**	0.0	0	0	0	0	0	0	0	0	0	0
2018	BAL	1	0	1	0	**1**	0.0	0	0	0	0	0	0	0	0	0	0
2019	BAL	1	0	2	1	**1**	0.0	0	0	0	0	0	0	0	0	0	0
2020	BAL	**2**	0	1	1	0	0.0	0	0	0	0	0	0	0	0	0	0
		6	0	8	5	3	0.0	0	0	0	0	0	0	0	0	0	0

== Personal life ==
Levine has three sisters and three brothers. Levine is the cousin of former NFL player Brandon Mitchell.
