= Alex Joseph (gridiron football) =

American football player (born 1988)

No. 7
- Position: Linebacker

Personal information
- Born: July 6, 1988 (age 38); Stamford, Connecticut, U.S.
- Listed height: 6 ft 2 in (1.88 m)
- Listed weight: 240 lb (109 kg)

Career information
- High school: Stamford
- College: Temple
- NFL draft: 2010: undrafted

Career history
- Green Bay Packers (2010)*; Oakland Raiders (2010)*; Carolina Panthers (2010)*; San Francisco 49ers (2010); Hamilton Tiger-Cats (2012–2013); Trenton Freedom (2015)
- * Offseason or practice squad member only

Career NFL statistics
- Tackles: 1
- Stats at Pro Football Reference
- Stats at CFL.ca (archive)

Alex Thomas Joseph (born July 6, 1988) is an American former professional football player who was a linebacker for the San Francisco 49ers of the National Football League (NFL). He played college football for the Temple Owls.

== Professional career ==
=== NFL ===
After going undrafted in the 2010 NFL draft, Joseph signed with the Green Bay Packers on April 30, 2010. He was released by the Packers before the season began.

Afterwards, he spent time in the practice squads for the Oakland Raiders and Carolina Panthers before being signed to the San Francisco 49ers. He was released by the 49ers on September 3, 2011.

=== CFL ===
On April 10, 2012, Joseph signed with the Hamilton Tiger-Cats of the Canadian Football League.

He was the Football/ facility Director for BlueStreak Sports Training, located in Stamford, Connecticut. Alex is now the cofounder of Xenhouse training located in Stamford, Connecticut.
