= Jay Ross (American football) =

American football player (born 1987)

No. 73, 69
- Position: Nose tackle

Personal information
- Born: October 3, 1987 (age 39); Wilmington, North Carolina, U.S.
- Listed height: 6 ft 3 in (1.91 m)
- Listed weight: 319 lb (145 kg)

Career information
- High school: New Hanover (Wilmington)
- College: East Carolina
- NFL draft: 2010: undrafted

Career history
- New Orleans Saints (2010)*; Green Bay Packers (2010–2011)*; Buffalo Bills (2011–2013)
- * Offseason or practice squad member only

Awards and highlights
- Super Bowl champion (XLV)

Career NFL statistics
- Total tackles: 1
- Stats at Pro Football Reference

Jay Randall Ross (born October 3, 1987) is an American former professional football player who was a nose tackle in the National Football League (NFL). He played college football for the East Carolina Pirates. He was signed as an undrafted free agent by the New Orleans Saints in 2010.

== Professional career ==
Pre-draft measurables
Height	Weight	40-yard dash	10-yard split	20-yard split	20-yard shuttle	Three-cone drill	Vertical jump	Broad jump	Bench press
6 ft 3 in (1.91 m)	313 lb (142 kg)	5.10 s	1.68 s	2.87 s	4.64 s	7.83 s	32 in (0.81 m)	8 ft 4 in (2.54 m)	30 reps
All values from NFL Combine

=== New Orleans Saints ===
Following the conclusion of the 2010 NFL draft on April 26, 2010, the New Orleans Saints signed Ross to a contract. Ross was released by the team during the final roster cuts prior to the start of the season on September 4, 2010.

=== Green Bay Packers ===
Ross was signed to the Green Bay Packers' practice squad on October 20, 2010.
