= 2007 Green Bay Packers season =

NFL team season

- Owner: Green Bay Packers, Inc.
- General manager: Ted Thompson
- Head coach: Mike McCarthy
- Offensive coordinator: Joe Philbin
- Defensive coordinator: Bob Sanders
- Home stadium: Lambeau Field

Results
- Record: 13–3
- Division place: 1st NFC North
- Playoffs: Won Divisional Playoffs (vs. Seahawks) 42–20; Lost NFC Championship (vs. Giants) 20–23 (OT)
- All-Pros: 4: QB Brett Favre (2nd team); DE Aaron Kampman (2nd team); MLB Nick Barnett (2nd team); CB Al Harris (2nd team)
- Pro Bowlers: 5: QB Brett Favre; WR Donald Driver; OT Chad Clifton; DE Aaron Kampman; CB Al Harris

Uniform

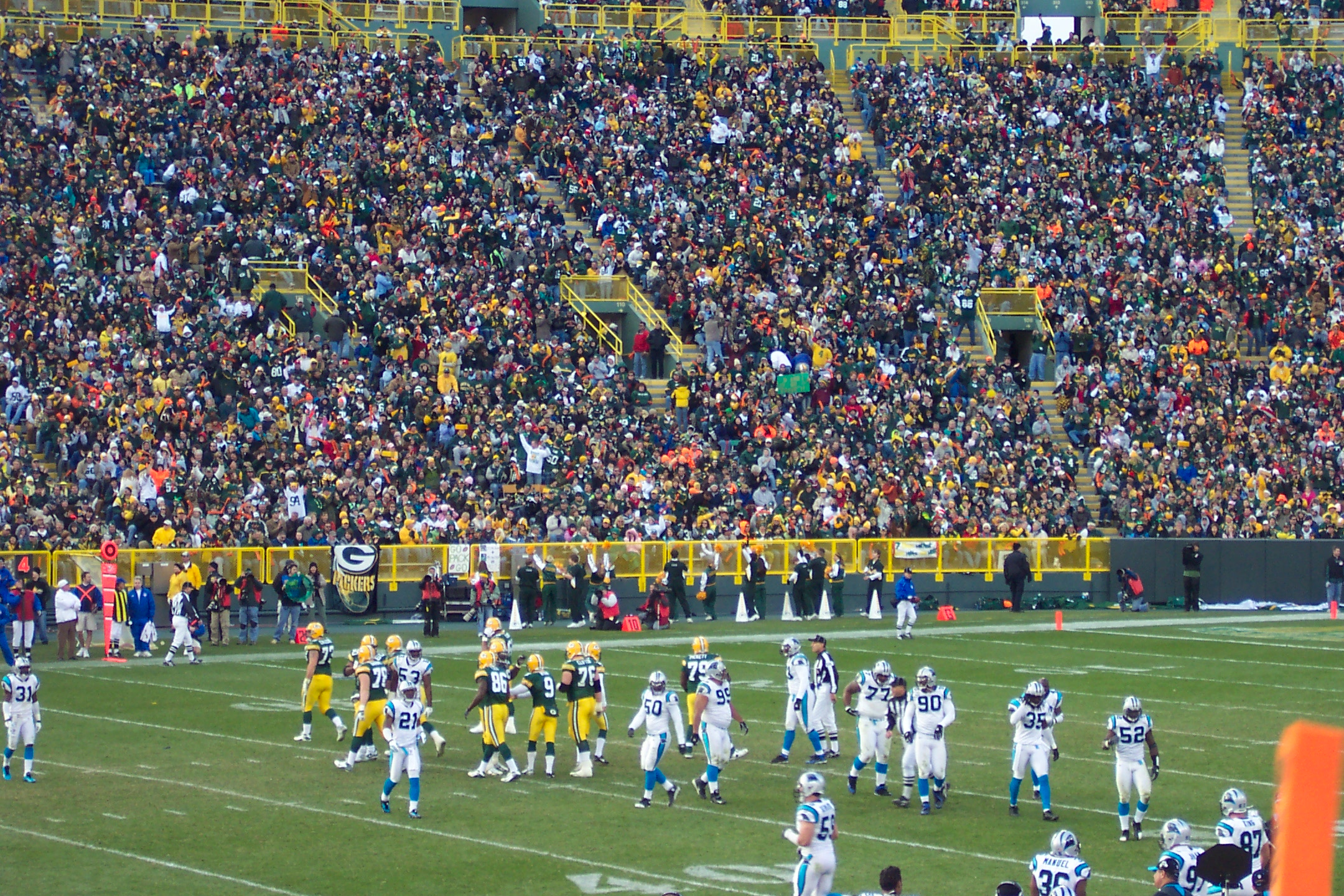
The Packers on offense at home to the Carolina Panthers in week 11

The 2007 Green Bay Packers season was the franchise's 89th overall and 87th season in the National Football League (NFL). The Packers finished the regular season with a 13–3 record and clinched their first winning season, playoff appearance and division title since 2004. They received for the first time since 1997 a bye for the first round of the playoffs, and won their divisional round playoff game to advance to the franchise's first NFC Championship Game in 10 years. The Packers ultimately lost the NFC Championship game to the eventual Super Bowl champion New York Giants. It was the first time the Packers had lost a home NFC Championship game, and only their third home playoff loss ever. This was the last season for quarterback Brett Favre as a Green Bay Packer, as he initially retired following the season but came out of retirement and was subsequently traded to the New York Jets during the offseason.

This season also marked the 50th anniversary of the opening of the Packers' home stadium of Lambeau Field. The Packers' tenure at Lambeau, now at 64 seasons, is the longest in NFL history at a single stadium, breaking the Chicago Bears' previous record of 50 seasons at Wrigley Field (1921–1970).

== Offseason ==
On February 2, 2007, Brett Favre announced that he would return for the 2007 season. "I am so excited about coming back," the 37-year-old quarterback said on the website of The Sun Herald in Biloxi, Mississippi. He also commented, "We have a good nucleus of young players. We were 8–8 last year, and that's encouraging."

Ted Thompson, Green Bay's general manager, confirmed the news, saying, "The Packers are excited by his decision and look forward to a successful 2007 campaign." This would be, however, Brett Favre's last season with the Packers, after 16 years on the team.

=== 2007 NFL draft ===
The 2007 NFL draft occurred on April 28–29. The Packers picked 16th overall, selecting defensive tackle Justin Harrell in the first round.

2007 Packers draft selections
Round/Pick	Player	Position	College
1/16	Justin Harrell	Defensive tackle	Tennessee
2/47	Traded to NY Jets along with No. 235 for Nos. 63, 89, and 191		
2/63 (From NY Jets)	Brandon Jackson	Running back	Nebraska
3/78	James Jones	Wide receiver	San Jose State
3/89 (From NY Jets)	Aaron Rouse	Safety	Virginia Tech
4/112	Traded to Pittsburgh for Nos. 119 & 192		
4/119 (From Pittsburgh)	Allen Barbre	Offensive tackle	Missouri Southern St.
5/157	David Clowney	Wide Receiver	Virginia Tech
6/191 (from NY Jets)	Korey Hall	Inside linebacker	Boise State
6/192 (From Pittsburgh)	Desmond Bishop	Inside linebacker	Cal
6/193	Mason Crosby	Kicker	Colorado
7/228	DeShawn Wynn	Running Back	Florida
7/235	Traded to NY Jets along with No. 47 for Nos. 63, 89, and 191		
7/243 (compensatory)	Clark Harris	Tight end	Rutgers

Reportedly, the Packers were in talks with Oakland Raiders wide receiver Randy Moss at the behest of Brett Favre. If the Packers had made the move to acquire the 30-year-old wide receiver, the trade would no doubt have been a controversial one, as Moss had a long and storied history with the Green Bay franchise. While Moss's salary was high, Green Bay, at the time, reportedly had $24 million of cap space, and could have absorbed his contract easily. These rumors were put to an end on April 29, 2007, when Oakland dealt Moss to New England for a 4th round draft pick. In the days following the NFL draft, Favre was upset concerning Green Bay's inability to acquire Moss. Favre was reportedly so upset that his agent requested that the Packers trade him. Coach Mike McCarthy was able to calm Favre down over the phone, and Favre eventually admitted that while he wanted to win, he did not want to be traded in order to do so.

=== Departures ===
On March 5, the Texans signed running back Ahman Green to a contract.

On March 5, the Dolphins signed tight end David Martin to a contract.

On March 7, the Packers cut fullback William Henderson.

=== Free agents heading into the 2007 season ===
Position	Player	Free agency tag	Date signed	2007 team
DT	Kenderick Allen	UFA	May 11	Cincinnati Bengals
QB	Todd Bouman	UFA	October 25	Jacksonville Jaguars
RB	Ahman Green	UFA	March 5	Houston Texans
TE	Donald Lee	UFA	February 20	Green Bay Packers
TE	David Martin	UFA	March 5	Miami Dolphins
LB	Ben Taylor	UFA		
OG	Tyson Walter	UFA	March 5	Green Bay Packers
LB	Tracy White	UFA	March 7	Green Bay Packers
RFA: Restricted free agent, UFA: Unrestricted free agent, ERFA: Exclusive rights free agent

=== Roster ===
2007 Green Bay Packers roster
Quarterbacks (QB): 4 Brett Favre; 16 Craig Nall; 12 Aaron Rodgers; Running backs (RB): 25 Ryan Grant; 35 Korey Hall FB; 32 Brandon Jackson; 30 John Kuhn FB; 34 Vernand Morency; Wide receivers (WR): 19 Shaun Bodiford; 80 Donald Driver; 85 Greg Jennings; 89 James Jones; 82 Ruvell Martin; 81 Koren Robinson; Tight ends (TE): 88 Bubba Franks; 87 Ryan Krause; 86 Donald Lee	Offensive linemen (OL): 78 Allen Barbre RT; 76 Chad Clifton LT; 73 Daryn Colledge G; 62 Junius Coston G; 75 Tony Moll G; 72 Jason Spitz C; 65 Mark Tauscher RT; 63 Scott Wells C; Defensive linemen (DL): 93 Conrad Bolston DT; 94 Kabeer Gbaja-Biamila DE; 91 Justin Harrell DT; 57 Jason Hunter DE; 77 Cullen Jenkins DE; 74 Aaron Kampman DE; 96 Michael Montgomery DE; 95 Daniel Muir DT; 79 Ryan Pickett DT; 99 Corey Williams DT	Linebackers (LB): 56 Nick Barnett MLB; 55 Desmond Bishop MLB; 50 A. J. Hawk OLB; 51 Brady Poppinga OLB; 59 Tracy White OLB; Defensive backs (DB): 20 Atari Bigby SS; 27 Will Blackmon CB; 24 Jarrett Bush CB; 36 Nick Collins FS; 31 Al Harris CB; 26 Charlie Peprah SS; 37 Aaron Rouse FS; 41 Frank Walker CB; 38 Tramon Williams CB; 21 Charles Woodson CB; Special teams (ST): 2 Mason Crosby K; 60 Rob Davis LS; 9 Jon Ryan P	Practice squad: 47 Carl-Johan Björk OLB ^{Int'l}; 83 Chris Francies WR; 53 Spencer Havner OLB; 98 Alfred Malone DT; 61 Chris Patrick OT; 40 Joe Porter CB; 71 Cameron Stephenson G; 69 Orrin Thompson OT; 45 Corey White RB; Reserve: 90 Colin Cole DT (IR); 29 Tyrone Culver S (IR); 23 Noah Herron RB (IR); -- Abdul Hodge MLB (IR); 18 Carlyle Holiday WR (IR); 84 Tory Humphrey TE (IR); 93 Johnny Jolly DT (IR); 64 Tony Palmer G (IR); -- Ryan Powdrell FB (IR); 70 Tyson Walter C (IR); 42 DeShawn Wynn RB (IR); Rookies in italics 53 active, 11 reserve, 9 practice squad

== Preseason ==
=== Schedule ===
Week	Date	Opponent	Result	Record	Venue	Recap
1	August 11	at Pittsburgh Steelers	W 13–9	1–0	Heinz Field	Recap
2	August 18	Seattle Seahawks	W 48–13	2–0	Lambeau Field	Recap
3	August 23	Jacksonville Jaguars	L 13–21	2–1	Lambeau Field	Recap
4	August 30	at Tennessee Titans	L 14–30	2–2	LP Field	Recap

== Regular season ==
=== Schedule ===
Week	Date	Opponent	Result	Record	Venue	Recap
1	September 9	Philadelphia Eagles	W 16–13	1–0	Lambeau Field	Recap
2	September 16	at New York Giants	W 35–13	2–0	Giants Stadium	Recap
3	September 23	San Diego Chargers	W 31–24	3–0	Lambeau Field	Recap
4	September 30	at Minnesota Vikings	W 23–16	4–0	Hubert H. Humphrey Metrodome	Recap
5	October 7	Chicago Bears	L 20–27	4–1	Lambeau Field	Recap
6	October 14	Washington Redskins	W 17–14	5–1	Lambeau Field	Recap
7	Bye					
8	October 29	at Denver Broncos	W 19–13 (OT)	6–1	Invesco Field at Mile High	Recap
9	November 4	at Kansas City Chiefs	W 33–22	7–1	Arrowhead Stadium	Recap
10	November 11	Minnesota Vikings	W 34–0	8–1	Lambeau Field	Recap
11	November 18	Carolina Panthers	W 31–17	9–1	Lambeau Field	Recap
12	November 22	at Detroit Lions	W 37–26	10–1	Ford Field	Recap
13	November 29	at Dallas Cowboys	L 27–37	10–2	Texas Stadium	Recap
14	December 9	Oakland Raiders	W 38–7	11–2	Lambeau Field	Recap
15	December 16	at St. Louis Rams	W 33–14	12–2	Edward Jones Dome	Recap
16	December 23	at Chicago Bears	L 7–35	12–3	Soldier Field	Recap
17	December 30	Detroit Lions	W 34–13	13–3	Lambeau Field	Recap

== Standings ==
NFC North
	W	L	T	PCT	DIV	CONF	PF	PA	STK
^{(2)} Green Bay Packers	13	3	0	.813	4–2	9–3	435	291	W1
Minnesota Vikings	8	8	0	.500	3–3	6–6	365	311	L2
Detroit Lions	7	9	0	.438	3–3	4–8	346	444	L1
Chicago Bears	7	9	0	.438	2–4	4–8	334	348	W2

== Regular season results ==
=== Week 1: vs. Philadelphia Eagles ===
Quarter	1	2	3	4	Total
Eagles	0	10	3	0	13
Packers	10	0	3	3	16

at Lambeau Field, Green Bay, Wisconsin

- Game time: 1:00 PM EDT/12:00 PM CDT
- Game weather: 62 °F (17 °C) (Cloudy)
- Game attendance: 70,598
- Referee: Mike Carey
- TV announcers (Fox): Kenny Albert (play-by-play), Daryl Johnston (color commentator), & Tony Siragusa (sideline reporter)

The Packers began their season at home against the Philadelphia Eagles. In the first quarter, Green Bay's Jarrett Bush recovered the Eagles' Greg Lewis's muffed punt in the end zone for a touchdown. The contest was tied in the closing minutes but the Eagles again muffed a punt return, setting up a 42-yard kick from Packers rookie kicker Mason Crosby. This was the only game the Packers did not score an offensive touchdown. Crosby was named NFC Special Teams Player of the Week. Crosby is the only player in league history to boot a 50-plus-yard field goal and game winning field goal in the final minute in his first NFL game.

=== Week 2: at New York Giants ===
Quarter	1	2	3	4	Total
Packers	0	7	7	21	35
Giants	0	10	3	0	13

at Giants Stadium, East Rutherford, New Jersey

- Game time: 1:00 PM EDT
- Game weather: 64 °F (18 °C) (Mostly Cloudy)
- Game attendance: 78,701
- Referee: Gene Steratore
- TV announcers (Fox): Joe Buck (play-by-play), Troy Aikman (color commentator), & Pam Oliver (sideline reporter)

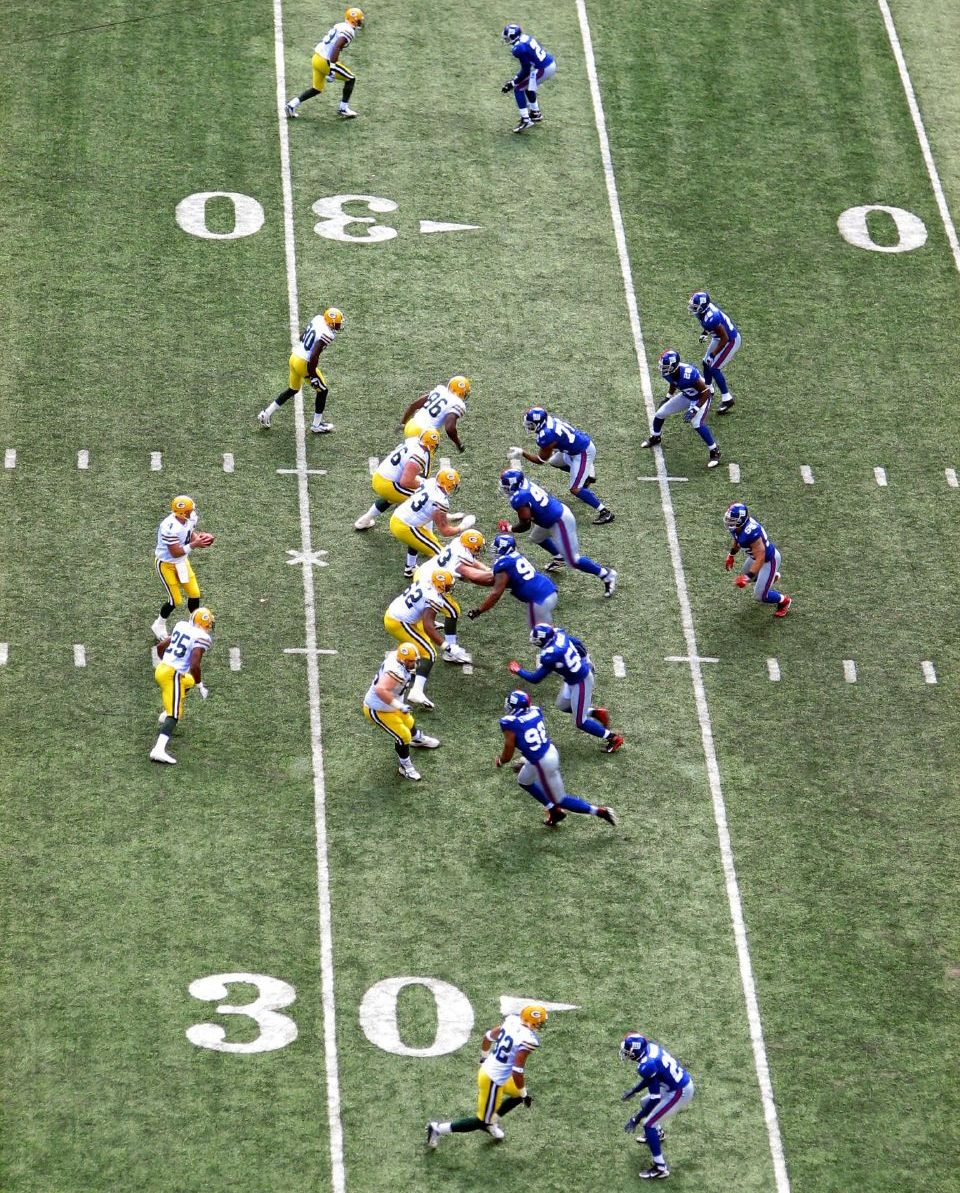
The Packers in the shotgun

Playing a close game until the fourth quarter, the Packers took a commanding lead late in the game (racking up 21 points in the final fifteen minutes) and winning the game 35–13. Early in the 4th quarter, Favre capped off a drive with a pass to the outside of the endzone to Donald Lee, and then followed it up with a 10-yard pass to Donald Driver by the goalpost for a score after the Giants fumbled the ensuing kickoff deep in their own territory. In the victory, Brett Favre threw for 286 yards and 3 touchdowns and gave him his 149th career win as a starter, the most by any quarterback in NFL history, surpassing John Elway. Favre was named NFC Offensive Player of the Week for games played September 16–17. Mike McCarthy was voted the Motorola NFL Coach of the Week.

=== Week 3: vs. San Diego Chargers ===
Quarter	1	2	3	4	Total
Chargers	7	7	7	3	24
Packers	3	14	0	14	31

at Lambeau Field, Green Bay, Wisconsin

- Game time: 10:00 a.m. PDT/12:00 p.m. CDT
- Game weather: 73 °F (23 °C) (Sunny)
- Game attendance: 70,733
- Referee: Jeff Triplette
- TV announcers (CBS): Jim Nantz (play-by-play) & Phil Simms (color commentator)

Quarterback Brett Favre threw three touchdown passes against the Chargers in the victory, bringing his career total to 420 and tying Dan Marino's career touchdown record. With just over two minutes remaining in the game and San Diego leading 21–17, Favre found wide receiver Greg Jennings for a 57-yard catch and run across the middle of the field for the go-ahead score. On the Chargers ensuing drive, linebacker Nick Barnett intercepted a Philip Rivers pass and returned it to the San Diego 1-yard line setting up the Packers final score and a 10-point lead. Barnett was voted the GMC Defensive Player of the Week for games played on September 23 – 24. This win made the Packers the only team to have missed the playoffs the previous season to return to open 3–0 against teams that made the playoffs the year before.

=== Week 4: at Minnesota Vikings ===
Quarter	1	2	3	4	Total
Packers	7	3	3	10	23
Vikings	0	6	3	7	16

at Hubert H. Humphrey Metrodome, Minneapolis, Minnesota

- Game time: 1:05 P.M. EDT/12:05 P.M. CDT
- Game weather: Indoors
- Game attendance: 63,779
- Referee: Ed Hochuli
- TV announcers (Fox): Ron Pitts (play-by-play) and J.C. Pearson (color commentator)

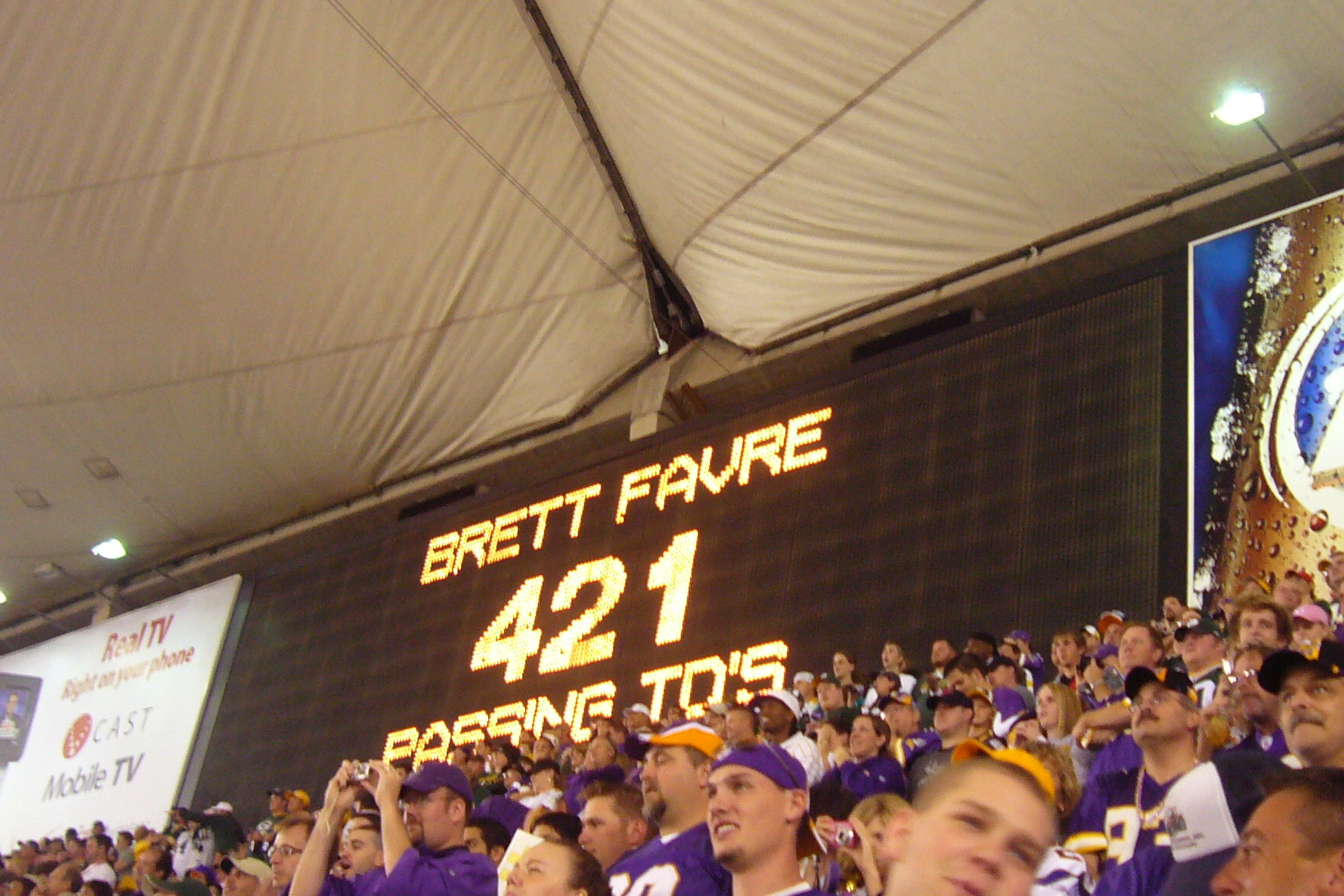
Brett Favre broke Dan Marino's TD pass record during Week 4 at the HHH Metrodome

Coming off their home win over the Chargers, the Packers flew to the Hubert H. Humphrey Metrodome for an NFC North division game against Minnesota. In the first quarter, quarterback Brett Favre threw a 16-yard touchdown pass to wide receiver Greg Jennings surpassing Dan Marino as the league's all-time leader in touchdown passes. He also became the league leader in pass attempts (8,393 at game's end). Favre was named the NFC Offensive Player of the Week for the second time this season, having thrown for 344 yards and two touchdowns.

With the win, the Packers stayed undefeated and improved to their first 4–0 start since 1998.

=== Week 5: vs. Chicago Bears ===
Quarter	1	2	3	4	Total
Bears	0	7	10	10	27
Packers	7	10	3	0	20

at Lambeau Field, Green Bay, Wisconsin

- Game time: 8:15 PM EDT/7:15 PM CDT
- Game weather: 79 °F (26 °C) (Cloudy)
- Game attendance: 70,904
- Referee: Larry Nemmers
- TV announcers (NBC): Al Michaels (play-by-play), John Madden (color commentator), & Andrea Kremer (sideline reporter)

Coming off a record-setting divisional road game against the Vikings, the Packers went home for a Sunday night divisional clash with their nemesis, the Chicago Bears. This would be the 174th meeting between the two teams.

In the first quarter, Green Bay got off to a fast start by capping off the game's opening drive with rookie running back DeShawn Wynn getting a 2-yard touchdown run for the only score of the period. In the second quarter, the Bears tied the game with running back Cedric Benson's 10-yard touchdown run. The Packers would end the first half with quarterback Brett Favre completing a 41-yard touchdown pass to wide receiver Greg Jennings, along with rookie kicker Mason Crosby converting a 37-yard field goal.

In the third quarter, Chicago crept closer with kicker Robbie Gould converting a 44-yard field goal. Green Bay responded with Crosby kicking a 37-yard field goal, yet the Bears pulled to within three as quarterback Brian Griese completed a 19-yard touchdown pass to tight end Greg Olsen. In the fourth quarter, Chicago erased their deficit completely with Gould's 36-yard field goal and Griese's 34-yard touchdown pass to tight end Desmond Clark.

With a turnover-plagued loss (5 turnovers on the night), the Packers fell to 4–1. Also, with two interceptions, Favre tied QB George Blanda at 277 for the most career interceptions. Also of note, Brady Poppinga intercepted a pass in the fourth quarter, extending the streak of at least one Packer interception per game for the 11th consecutive game. This matched the longest streak in team history, which occurred during an 11-game stretch in 1984–1985.

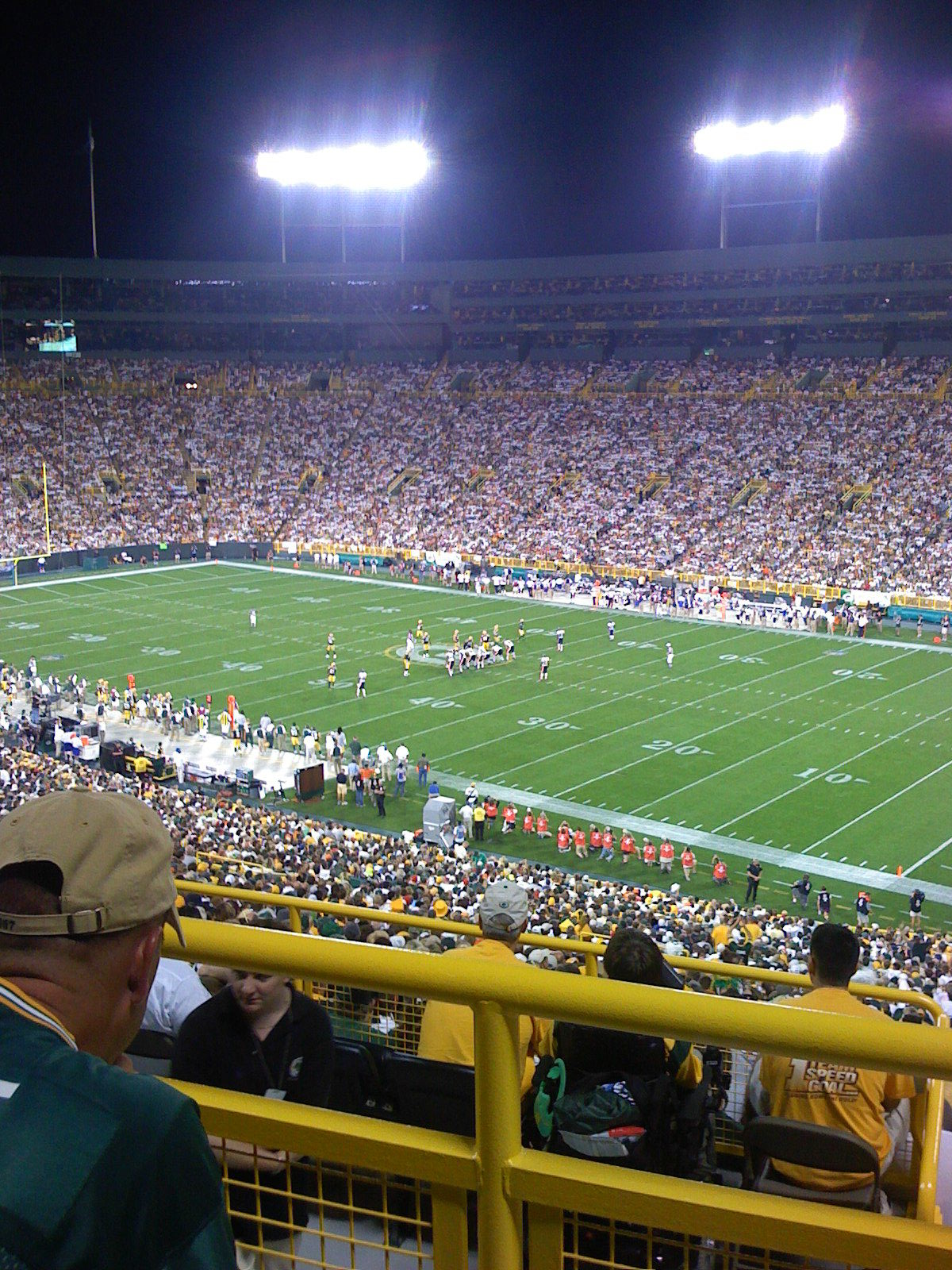
Lambeau Field during the visit of Chicago

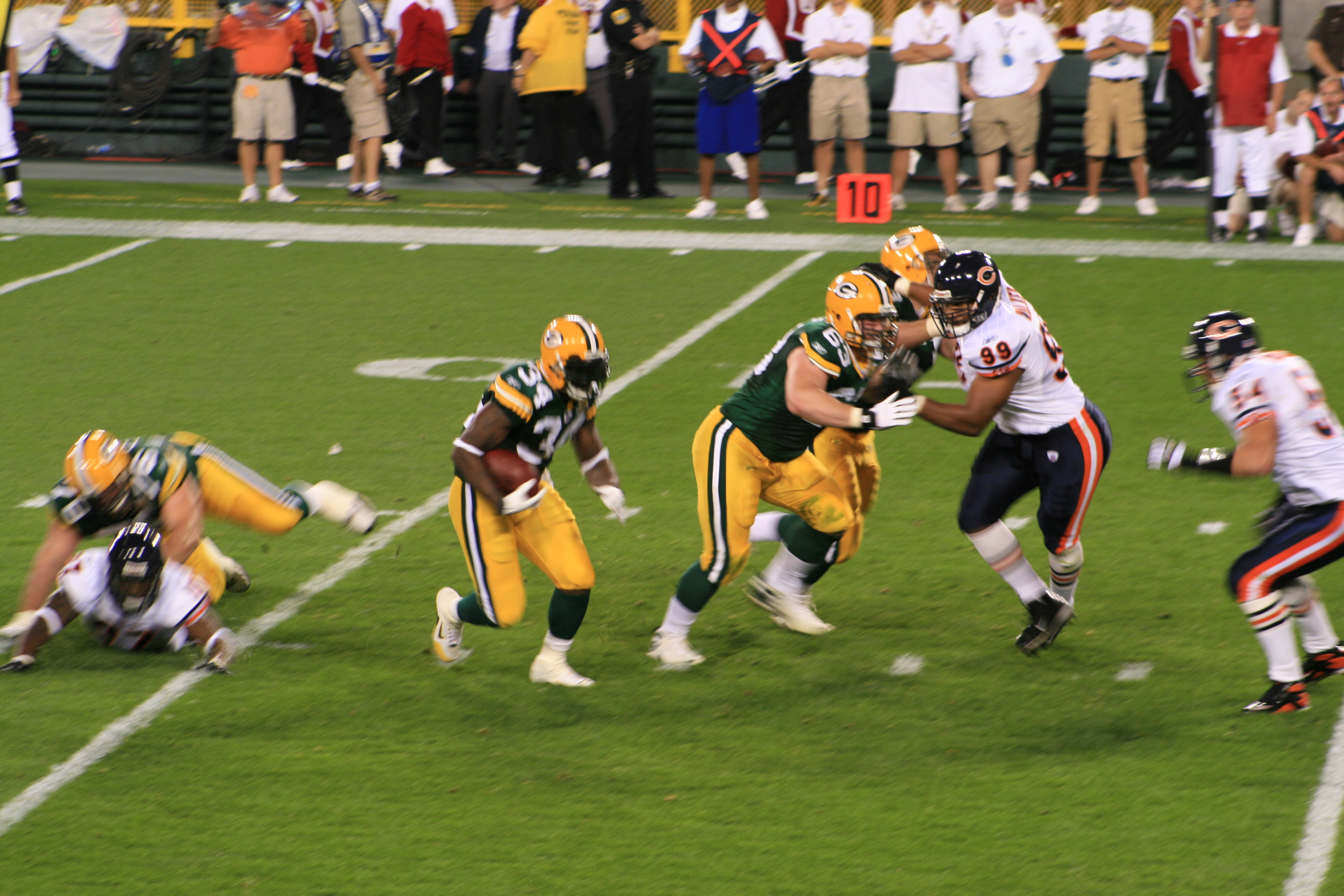
Vernand Morency rushes against Chicago in week 5

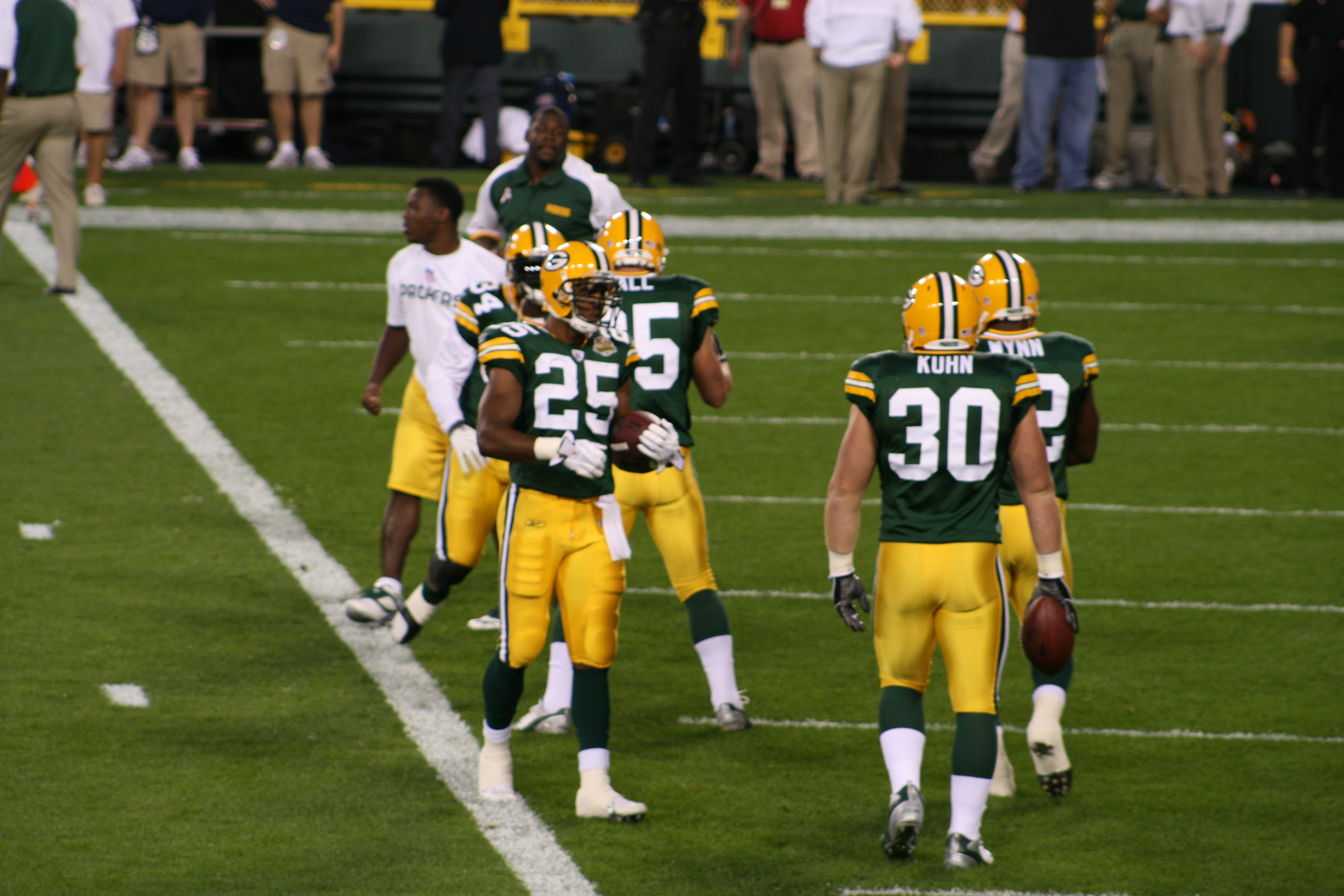
Ryan Grant #25, John Kuhn #30, DeShawn Wynn #42 and Korey Hall #35

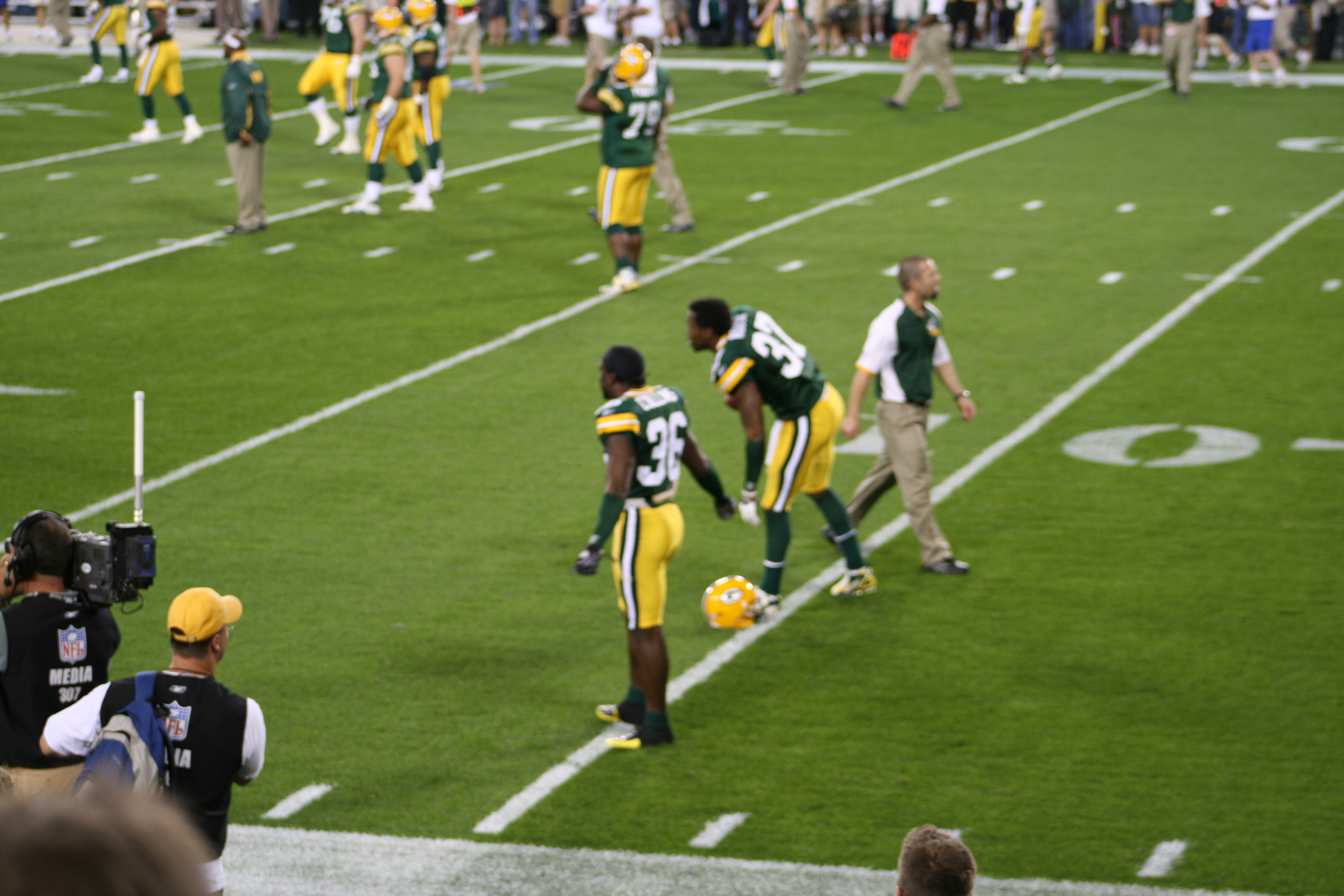
Packers secondary stretching before the game

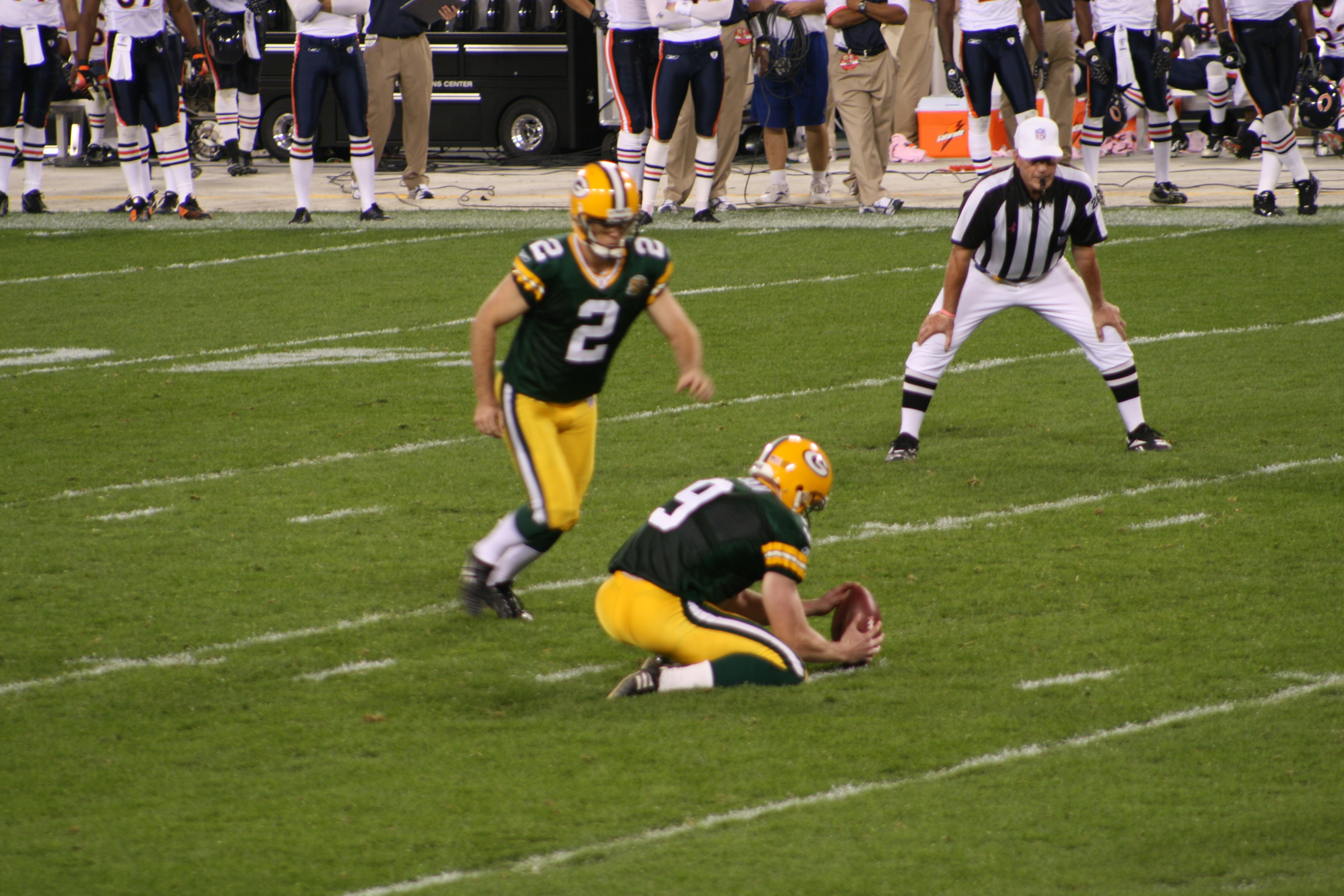
Mason Crosby kicks a field goal, held by Jon Ryan

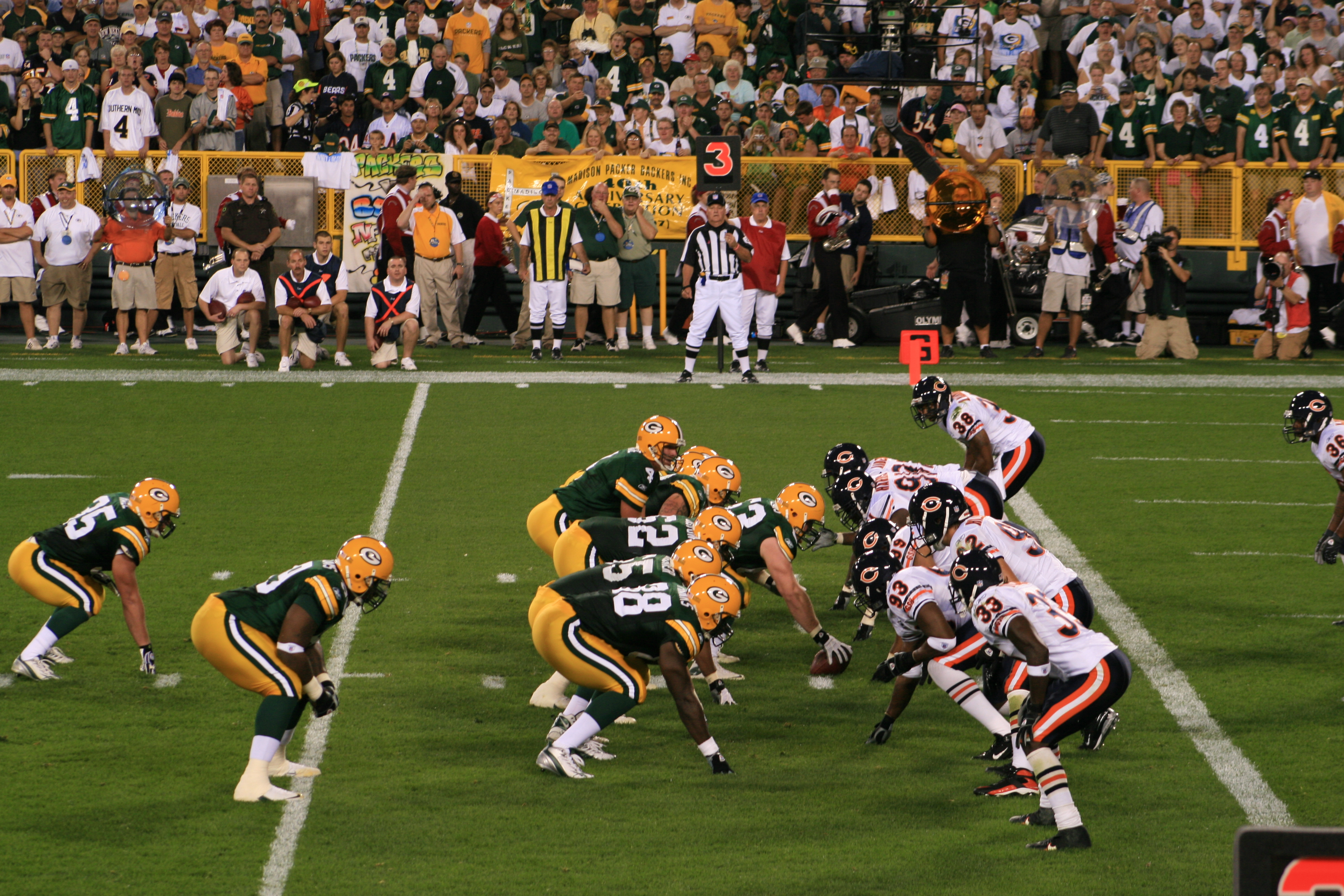
Green Bay sets up on offense at the 2-yard line

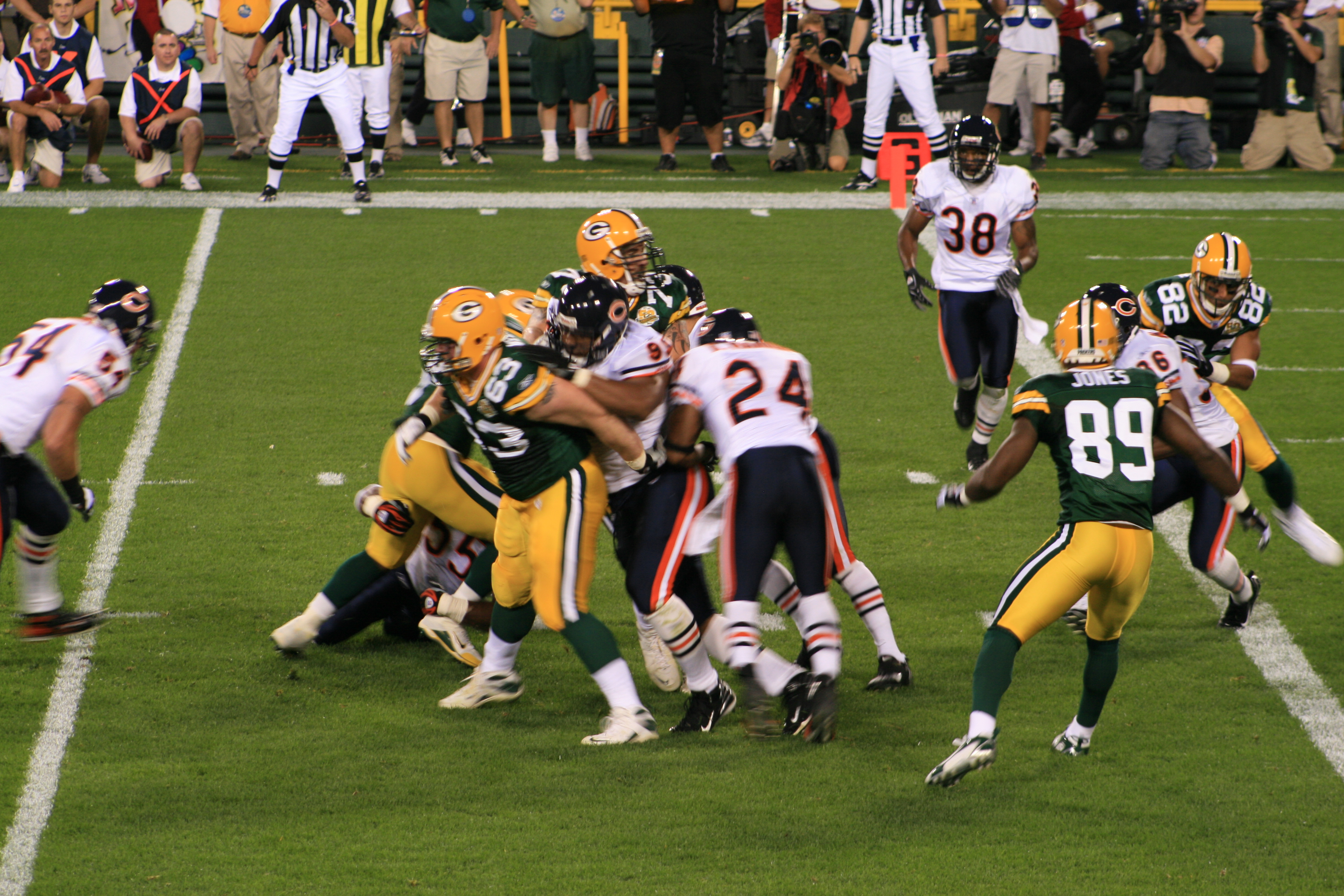
Play at the goal line, Chicago at Green Bay

=== Week 6: vs. Washington Redskins ===
Quarter	1	2	3	4	Total
Redskins	7	7	0	0	14
Packers	7	0	10	0	17

at Lambeau Field, Green Bay, Wisconsin

- Game weather: 47 °F (8 °C) (rain)
- Game attendance: 70,761
- Referee: Terry McAulay
- TV announcers (Fox): Kenny Albert (play-by-play) and Troy Aikman (color commentator). Pam Oliver was the sideline reporter.

On October 14, 2007 Charles Woodson picked up a Santana Moss fumble and returned it 57 yards for a go-ahead touchdown in a 17–14 victory over the Washington Redskins. He also recorded an interception in the game, his first of the season. This was the 12 straight game that Green Bay has recorded an interception, making it a new team record surpassing an 11-game stretch in 1984–1985. In the third quarter, Redskins safety Sean Taylor intercepted a Brett Favre pass making Favre the career interception leader in NFL history, eclipsing George Blanda's record of 277 interceptions. Favre threw two interceptions for the game. Woodson was named the NFC's Defensive Player of the Week for his performance versus the Redskins. It was the first time he has received this award.

With the win, the Packers entered its bye week at 5–1.

=== Week 8: at Denver Broncos ===
Quarter	1	2	3	4	OT	Total
Packers	7	6	0	0	6	19
Broncos	7	0	3	3	0	13

at Invesco Field at Mile High, Denver, Colorado

- Game time: 8:30 PM EDT (Monday Night Football)
- Game weather: 67 °F (19 °C), (Partly Cloudy)
- Game attendance: 77,160
- Referee: Ron Winter
- TV announcers (ESPN): Mike Tirico (play-by-play), Ron Jaworski, Tony Kornheiser (color commentators), Michele Tafoya, & Suzy Kolber (sideline reporters)

Following their bye week, the Packers flew to Denver to take on the Broncos on Monday Night Football. In the first quarter, Broncos quarterback Jay Cutler opened the scoring with a 5-yard touchdown pass to tight end Tony Scheffler. On the first play of the ensuing series Brett Favre completed a 79-yard touchdown to rookie wide receiver James Jones. In the second quarter, rookie kicker Mason Crosby converted a 19-yard field goal, followed by a 26-yard field goal, and the Packers took a 13–7 lead into halftime.

In the third quarter, Broncos kicker Jason Elam converted a 45-yard field goal to cut Green Bay's lead to 3 points. In the fourth quarter, after getting the ball back with 2:27 remaining in the game, Cutler led a drive that began on the Bronco seven-yard line down the length of the field to the Green Bay four-yard line. On a 3rd and 1 Cutler attempted a quarterback draw to win the game, but Ryan Pickett stopped Cutler for no gain on the play. With no time outs remaining Elam and the kicking unit ran onto the field and converted a field goal to tie the game on the final play of the quarter.

Greg Jennings called heads and won the overtime coin toss, allowing Green Bay to receive the ball to begin overtime. On the first play, Favre threw an 82-yard touchdown pass to Jennings, who had outrun Broncos cornerback Dré Bly for the catch. This was Favre's 13th touchdown pass of 75 yards or more, most of any player in NFL history. Favre also becomes the first Packers player to throw two touchdown passes of 75 yards or more in the same game. Only three quarterbacks have accomplished the feat since 1990. Ryan Grant ran for 104 yards, the first Packer to break the 100 yard rushing mark this season.

With the win (their first ever in Denver), the Packers improved to 6–1. On November 1, 2007 Aaron Kampman was named the NFC Defensive Player of the Month for October, having recorded 5.5 sacks during that time period. Brett Favre was voted the Fedex Air and Ground NFL Player of the Week award for games played on October 28 – 29, the third time this season he has received this award. Wide receiver James Jones of the Packers was announced as the Diet Pepsi 2007 Rookie of the Week for games played on October 28–29. Jones made three receptions for 107 yards including a first-quarter 79-yard touchdown.

=== Week 9: at Kansas City Chiefs ===
Quarter	1	2	3	4	Total
Packers	0	6	7	20	33
Chiefs	0	7	0	15	22

at Arrowhead Stadium, Kansas City, Missouri

- Game time: 1:00 PM EST/12:00 PM CST
- Game weather: 61 °F (16 °C) (Clear skies)
- Game attendance: 78,988
- Referee: Walt Anderson
- TV announcers (Fox): Joe Buck (play-by-play), Troy Aikman (color commentator), & Pam Oliver (sideline reporter)

Coming off their Monday Night road win over the Broncos, the Packers flew to Arrowhead Stadium for a Week 9 interconference duel with the Kansas City Chiefs. After a scoreless first quarter, Green Bay drew first blood with rookie kicker Mason Crosby getting a 48-yard and a 36-yard field goal. However, the Chiefs would take the lead into halftime as running back Larry Johnson completed a 1-yard touchdown run.

In the third quarter, the Packers regained the lead as Favre completed a 13-yard touchdown pass to wide receiver Greg Jennings for the only score of the period. In the fourth quarter, Kansas City regained the lead with quarterback Damon Huard completing a 30-yard touchdown pass to Johnson. Green Bay replied with Crosby kicking a 32-yard field goal, yet the Chiefs answered with Huard completing a 17-yard touchdown pass to tight end Tony Gonzalez (with running back Priest Holmes getting the 2-point conversion run). The Packers pulled back into the lead as Favre and Jennings hooked up again on a 60-yard touchdown pass. Afterwards, Crosby made a 45-yard field goal, and cornerback Charles Woodson returned an interception 46 yards for a touchdown.

With the win, the Packers improved to 7–1. Brett Favre also became the third quarterback to defeat all of the other 31 NFL teams at least once. Peyton Manning and Tom Brady had been the first two to do so, just hours apart, the week before.

The Packers scored 17 points in the final 3:05 on a defense that hadn't given up more than 20 all year. Favre joined Peyton Manning and Tom Brady as quarterbacks who've beaten all 31 other teams in the NFL. Favre rallied the Packers to victory from a fourth-quarter deficit or tie for the fourth time this season and 40th in his career, second only to John Elway's 46 fourth-quarter comebacks. The Packers have won 11 of their last 12 games, dating back to last season. Their sixth straight road wins tie for the second-longest away-from-home streak in team history.

=== Week 10: vs. Minnesota Vikings ===
Quarter	1	2	3	4	Total
Vikings	0	0	0	0	0
Packers	7	6	14	7	34

at Lambeau Field, Green Bay, Wisconsin

- Game time: 1:00 PM EDT/12:00 PM CDT
- Game weather: 53 °F (12 °C) (Sunny)
- Game attendance: 70,945
- Referee: Gerry Austin
- TV announcers (Fox): Dick Stockton (play-by-play), Brian Baldinger (color commentator)

Playing their first home game since mid-October, the Packers hosted their division rivals, the Minnesota Vikings.

In the first half, the first career touchdown by Ryan Grant came on a 30-yard run and gave the Packers a 7–0 lead, and two field goals by Mason Crosby (a 39-yard field goal midway through the 2nd quarter and a 24-yard field goal at the end of the half) would provide all the first half scoring, as the Packers went to the locker room leading 13–0.

In the second half, Brett Favre threw a pair of third-quarter touchdown passes, one to Donald Lee and one to Ruvell Martin (which was Favre's 200th TD pass at Lambeau Field), giving the Packers a 27–0 lead. With an additional Martin touchdown catch in the 4th quarter, the Packers shut out the Vikings 34–0, their first shutout of 2007. The Packers defense held Adrian Peterson to a season-low 45 yards on 11 carries a week after he set the NFL single-game rushing record with 296 yards against the San Diego Chargers. Grant became the first running back to reach the century mark against the Vikings this season, rushing for 119 yards on 25 carries, his career best.

With the win, the Packers improved to 8–1, which matched the best start to a season in Brett Favre's career (in 1996 and 2002). This game was the first time the Vikings had been shut out since 1991, and halted the Vikings’ NFL-record run of 260 consecutive regular-season games with a point. The game was Green Bay's first shutout of the Vikings in 94 games of the rivalry.

During the game, Favre became only the second NFL quarterback to throw for 60,000 yards in a career. He now has 60,257 yards' passing in his 17-year NFL career, second only to Dan Marino's career passing record of 61,361 yards. On November 15, 2007, the NFL announced Favre and running back Ryan Grant were voted the FedEx Air & Ground NFL Players of the Week for games played on November 11–12. Favre has received the FedEx Air award four times this season. Coach McCarthy was voted the Motorola NFL Coach of the Week for games played on November 11–12, the second time he has received the award this season.

=== Week 11: vs. Carolina Panthers ===
Quarter	1	2	3	4	Total
Panthers	3	0	7	7	17
Packers	7	14	7	3	31

at Lambeau Field, Green Bay, Wisconsin

- Game time: 1:00 PM EDT/12:00 PM CDT
- Game weather: 42 °F (6 °C) (Mostly Cloudy)
- Game attendance: 70,805
- Referee: Gene Steratore
- TV announcers (Fox): Dick Stockton (play-by-play) & Brian Baldinger (color commentator)

38-year-old Brett Favre faced off against 44-year-old Carolina quarterback Vinny Testaverde in a game that featured the oldest starting quarterbacks duo in NFL history. Favre threw 3 touchdown passes, and Tramon Williams returned a punt 94-yard for another touchdown as Green Bay defeated the Carolina Panthers 31–17. It was Favre's 62nd career game with at least three touchdown passes, tying Dan Marino's record.

The win moved Green Bay to 9–1 on the season, its best start through the first 10 games since 1962. This is also Favre's best 10 game start to a season in his career. Packers punt returner Tramon Williams was named Special Teams Players of the Week for games played the 11th week of the 2007 season (November 18–19). Packers defensive tackle Corey Williams was voted the GMC Defensive Player of the Week for games played on November 18–19. Williams posted four solo tackles, two sacks and two forced fumbles during the game.

=== Week 12: at Detroit Lions ===
Quarter	1	2	3	4	Total
Packers	0	17	14	6	37
Lions	6	3	3	14	26

at Ford Field, Detroit, Michigan

- Game time: 12:30 PM EDT/11:30 AM CDT
- Game weather: 68 °F (20 °C)
- Game attendance: 63,257
- Referee: Scott Green
- TV announcers (Fox): Joe Buck (play-by-play), Troy Aikman (color commentator), & Pam Oliver (sideline reporter)

Coming off their home win over the Panthers, the Packers flew to Ford Field for a Week 12 Thanksgiving NFC North duel with the Detroit Lions. Lions kicker Jason Hanson completed a 47-yard field goal, and followed it with a 41-yarder to give the Lions a 6–0 lead after the first quarter. Brett Favre started the second quarter with an 11-yard TD pass to Greg Jennings. The Packers held on to the lead for the remainder of the game, winning 37–26. The win moved the Packers to 10–1 on the season.

Favre finished the game with 3 touchdowns, the 63rd time he has thrown 3 or more touchdowns in a game, breaking the record he held with Dan Marino. At one point during the game, Favre completed 20 consecutive passes, breaking the Packers team record of 18 (held by Don Majkowski and Lynn Dickey). Favre threw for 381 passing yards, which was his seventh 300-yard passing game of the season, tying a career-high. For his performance, Favre was awarded Fox's Galloping Gobbler Award. Favre also was voted Fedex Air NFL Player of the Week, the fifth time this year he has received the award.

Green Bay has equaled its best 11-game record since 1929.

With the win, the Packers improved to 10–1 (the team's best start since 1962).

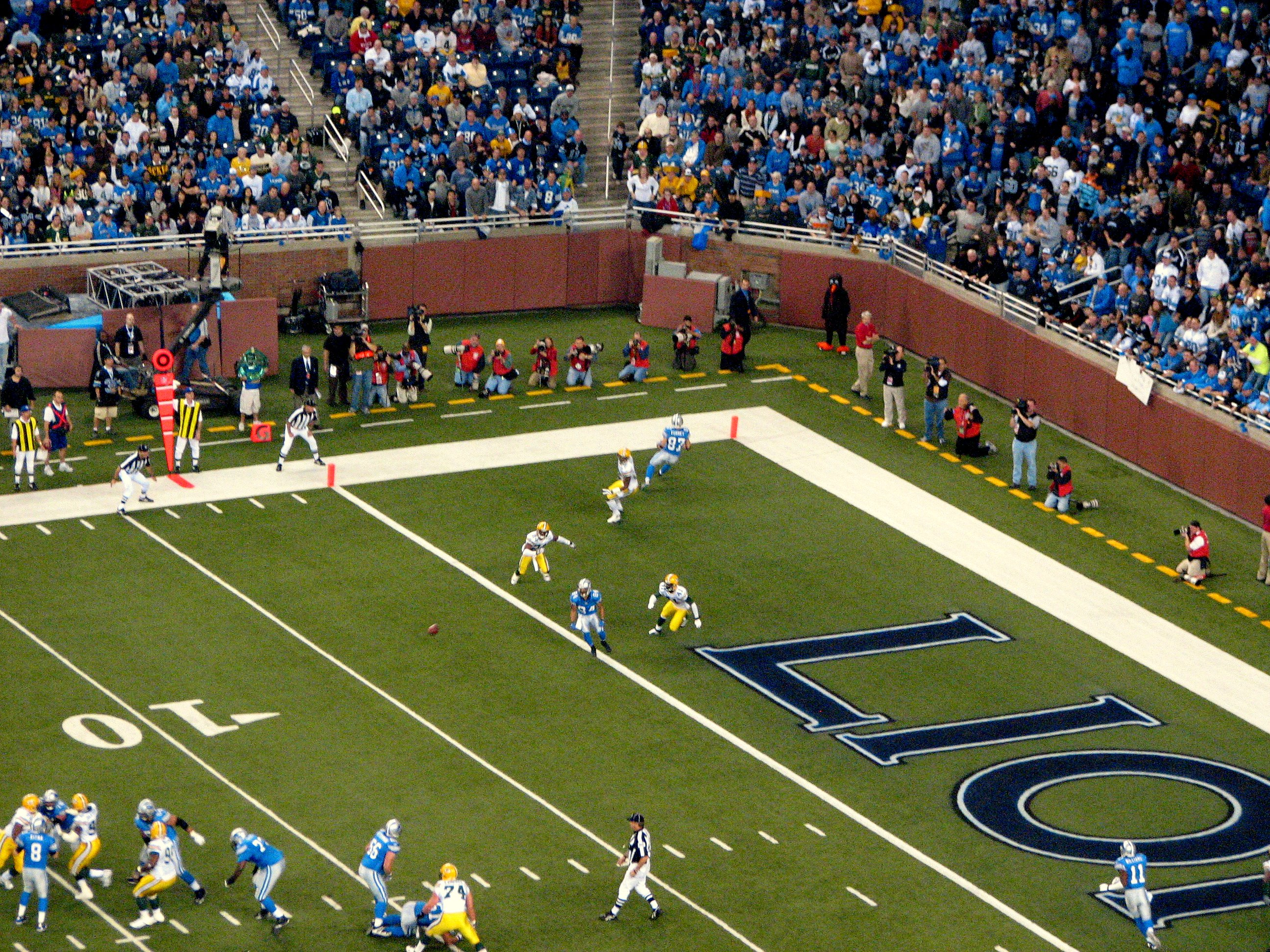
A Detroit passing play

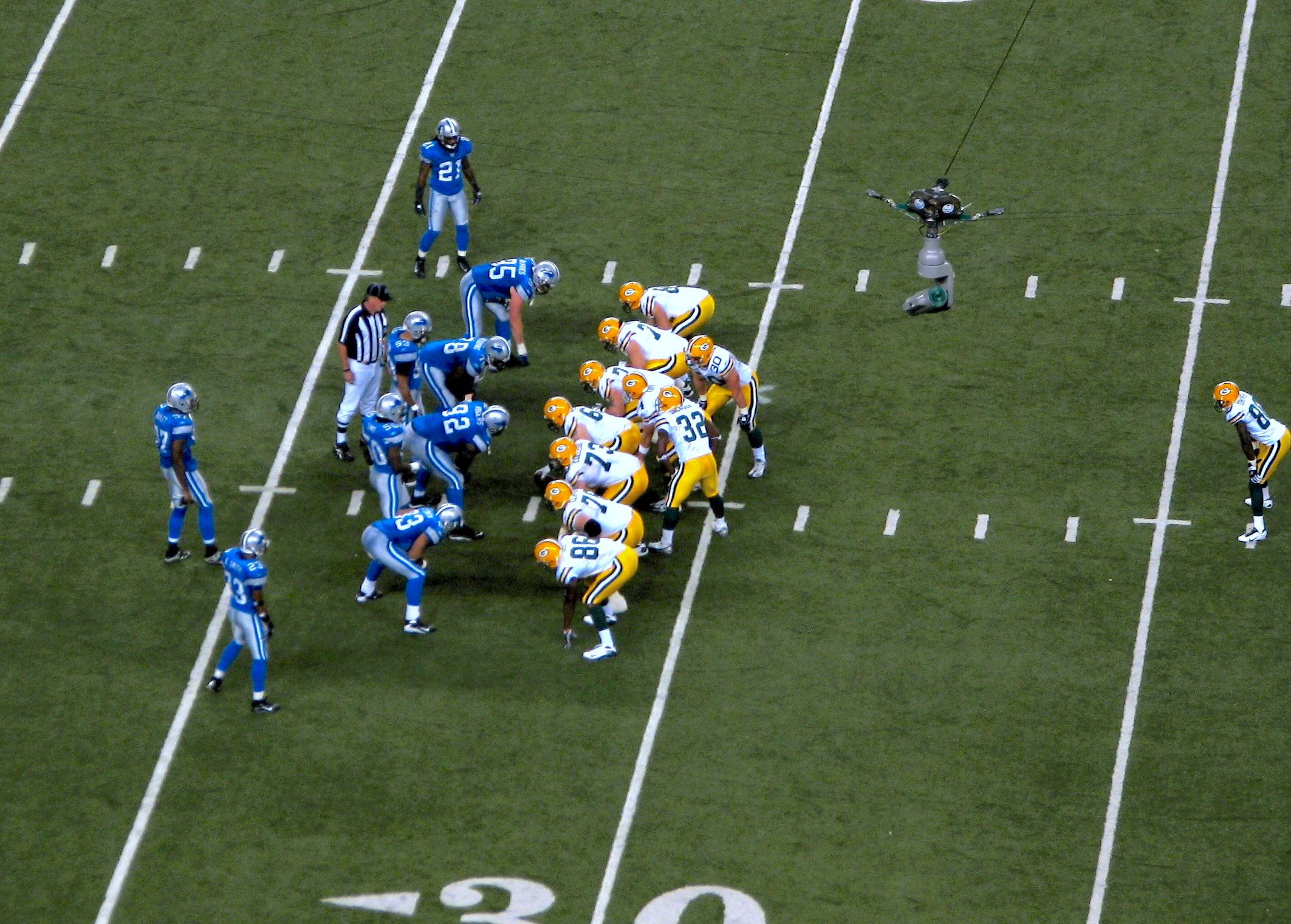
Brett Favre kneels at the end of the game

=== Week 13: at Dallas Cowboys ===
Quarter	1	2	3	4	Total
Packers	10	7	7	3	27
Cowboys	13	14	0	10	37

at Texas Stadium, Irving, Texas

- Game time: 8:15 PM EDT/7:15 PM CDT
- Game weather: 56 °F (13 °C) (Clear)
- Game attendance: 64,167
- Referee: John Parry
- TV announcers (NFL Network): Bryant Gumbel (play-by-play) and Cris Collinsworth (color commentator)

Coming off their Thanksgiving win over their divisional foe, the Lions, the Packers flew to Texas Stadium for a Week 13 Thursday night intraconference duel with the throwback-clad Dallas Cowboys. This match-up would see two 10–1 teams face one another for the first time since 1990 when the New York Giants lost to the San Francisco 49ers. Cowboys quarterback Tony Romo faced off against his boyhood idol Brett Favre in the game.

The Packers started the game missing two key players of their defense, with injured cornerback Charles Woodson (tied for 7th in the NFL with 4 interceptions) and defensive end Kabeer Gbaja-Biamila (tied for 6th in the NFL with 9.5 sacks) on the inactive list. In the first quarter, Green Bay took the early lead as rookie kicker Mason Crosby completed a 47-yard field goal. On the second play of the Cowboys opening drive, Al Harris stripped the ball from Terrell Owens and side judge Laird Hayes signaled Green Bay ball, but head linesman Derick Bowers overruled him. The only option for Mike McCarthy to challenge on the play, since the whistle was blown, was whether it was a reception – the strip could not be reviewed. The replay upheld the reception and Dallas retained possession. Nick Folk completed a 26-yard field goal to tie the game. Folk also completed a 51-yard field goal, and QB Tony Romo threw a 3-yard TD pass to WR Patrick Crayton. The Packers would end the first quarter with rookie RB Ryan Grant running for a 62-yard touchdown. In the second quarter, Dallas responded with Romo completing a 26-yard TD pass to TE Anthony Fasano and a 10-yard TD pass to WR Terrell Owens. Brett Favre left the game in the second quarter after he hit his right elbow on the helmet of a blitzing Cowboys CB Nate Jones. The throw led to Favre's second interception. Packers quarterback Aaron Rodgers took over for the Packers next series and led the offense on a 74-yard drive, capping it off with an 11-yard TD pass to WR Greg Jennings.

In the third, Grant finished off a 69-yard Packer drive with a 1-yard TD run for the only score of the quarter. In the fourth quarter, Romo completed a 4-yard TD pass to Crayton. Mason Crosby kicked a 52-yard field goal with just over 5 minutes remaining in the game to pull the Packers within a field goal. Dallas sealed the win as Folk kicked a 25-yard field goal with 1:03 left in the game. The Packers were flagged for a season-high 142 penalty yards.

With the loss, the Packers fell to 10–2. This is the last Packers loss in Dallas to date, as the two teams would not meet again in Dallas until the 2013 season, where Green Bay overcame a 26–3 deficit to beat the Cowboys 37–36. The Packers, since then, have gone 3–0–1 in Dallas in the regular season, the latest result being a 40–40 tie in 2025.

=== Week 14: vs. Oakland Raiders ===
Quarter	1	2	3	4	Total
Raiders	0	7	0	0	7
Packers	0	14	17	7	38

at Lambeau Field, Green Bay, Wisconsin

- Game time: 1:00 PM EDT/12:00 PM CDT
- Game weather: 18 °F (−8 °C) (Mostly Cloudy)
- Game attendance: 70,828
- Referee: Ed Hochuli
- TV announcers (CBS): Kevin Harlan (play-by-play) & Rich Gannon (color commentator)

Hoping to rebound from their Thursday night road loss to the Cowboys, the Packers went home for Favre's 250th (270th including playoffs) consecutive start, along with Green Bay's Week 14 interconference duel with the Oakland Raiders.

After a scoreless first quarter, the Packers sliced away in the second quarter with rookie RB Ryan Grant getting a 6-yard TD run, while CB Will Blackmon returned a punt 57 yards for a touchdown. The Raiders would end the half with their only score of the game as QB Josh McCown completed a 25-yard TD pass to WR Jerry Porter.

In the third quarter, Green Bay took control with rookie Mason Crosby nailing a 44-yard field goal, QB Brett Favre completing an 80-yard TD pass to WR Greg Jennings, while Blackmon recovered an Oakland fumble in their endzone for a touchdown (making him the first player since Cincinnati's Lemar Parrish in 1974 to return a punt and a fumble for a touchdown in one game). In the fourth quarter, the Packers pulled away with Favre completing a 46-yard TD pass to TE Donald Lee.

With the win, not only did Green Bay improve to 11–2, but they also clinched the NFC North division title.

It was the Packers' 18th division title, along with their 24th playoff berth with three games remaining in the season – the second-fastest division title in team history. Blackmon was awarded NFC Special Teams Player of the Week honors for his performance.

=== Week 15: at St. Louis Rams ===
Quarter	1	2	3	4	Total
Packers	7	10	10	6	33
Rams	7	7	0	0	14

at Edward Jones Dome, St. Louis, Missouri

- Game time: 1:00 PM EDT
- Game weather: Game Played Indoors (Domed Stadium)
- Game attendance: 66,008
- Referee: Ron Winter
- TV announcers (Fox): Kenny Albert (play-by-play), Daryl Johnston (color commentator), & Tony Siragusa (sideline reporter)

Coming off their dominating home win over the Raiders, the Packers flew to the Edward Jones Dome for a Week 15 duel with the St. Louis Rams. In the first quarter, Green Bay drew first blood as rookie RB Ryan Grant got a 1-yard TD run. Afterwards, the Rams responded with QB Marc Bulger completing a 4-yard TD pass to WR Torry Holt. In the second quarter, Green Bay went back into the lead as QB Brett Favre completing a 4-yard TD pass to TE Donald Lee, yet St. Louis answered with RB Steven Jackson getting a 46-yard TD run. The Packers would regain the lead prior to halftime with rookie kicker Mason Crosby getting a 44-yard field goal.

In the third quarter, Green Bay took control as Crosby kicked a 50-yard field goal, along with Favre completing a 44-yard TD pass to WR Greg Jennings. In the fourth quarter, the Pack finished the Rams off with Crosby nailing a 25-yard and a 46-yard field goal.

With the win, the Packers improved to 12–2.

Brett Favre came into the contest needing 184 yards to break Dan Marino's all-time record mark of 61,361 career passing yards. He broke the record, as he threw for 227 total yards in the game. The new record came on a seven-yard completion to Donald Driver. Ryan Grant and Greg Jennings each had a touchdown during the game, making it the first time two Packers players have each scored a touchdown in the same four consecutive games. Atari Bigby was voted the GMC Defensive Player of the Week for games played on December 13 – 17. Bigby made four tackles and two interceptions (a career high). Bigby intercepted the ball on the Packers' 22-yard line late in the second quarter to keep the Packers ahead by three going into halftime. Kicker Mason Crosby was voted the Diet Pepsi NFL Rookie of the Week for games played on December 13 – 17. Crosby went four-for-four in field goals, including a long 50-yard field goal and 46-yard and 44-yard kicks, and 3 for 3 in extra points.

With the Carolina Panthers defeating the Seattle Seahawks on the day, the Packers clinched a first round bye for the playoffs.

=== Week 16: at Chicago Bears ===
Quarter	1	2	3	4	Total
Packers	0	7	0	0	7
Bears	3	10	15	7	35

at Soldier Field, Chicago, Illinois

- Game time: 1:00 PM EDT
- Game weather: 16 °F (−9 °C), Wind chill: −1 °F (−18 °C), Winds: 30–40 mph (48–64 km/h) gusts)
- Game attendance: 62,272
- Referee: Jeff Triplette
- TV announcers (Fox): Joe Buck (play-by-play), Troy Aikman (color commentator), & Pam Oliver (sideline reporter)

In cold and windy conditions, Brett Favre threw 2 interceptions, and the Bears blocked 2 punts, en route to a 35–7 victory over the Packers, giving the Bears a sweep against Green Bay for the 2007 season. The Packers had not had a punt blocked in 12 years (929 punts). The last time the Packers had 2 punts blocked in a game was September 21, 1975, in a game against Detroit.

Favre ended the game with 158 passing yards, and he surpassed 4,000 yards passing for the season, the 5th time in his career to achieve the mark. Ryan Grant ran for 100 total yards and the only touchdown for the Packers.

With the loss, the Packers fell to 12–3 on the season.

=== Week 17: vs. Detroit Lions ===
Quarter	1	2	3	4	Total
Lions	3	7	3	0	13
Packers	14	7	10	3	34

at Lambeau Field, Green Bay, Wisconsin

- Game time: 1:00 PM EDT
- Game weather: 20 °F (−7 °C) (Cloudy)
- Game attendance: 70,869
- Referee: Pete Morelli
- TV announcers (Fox): Kenny Albert (play-by-play), Daryl Johnston (color commentator), & Tony Siragusa (sideline reporter)

Brett Favre left less than a minute into the second quarter with the game well in hand, as he had thrown two touchdown passes, and running back Ryan Grant had another one on a 27-yard run. Backup quarterback Craig Nall threw another touchdown in his first playing time in the NFL since 2004. Packers punter Jon Ryan had a 72-yard punt in the fourth quarter, the longest punt at Lambeau Field since 1965. Running back Brandon Jackson topped the 100 yard mark for the first time in his career, running for 113 yards. Packers rookie kicker Mason Crosby finished the season leading the NFL with 141 points, the highest-scoring season by a kicker in franchise history and third-highest season point total by any Packers player. Green Bay has 17 consecutive home victories over Detroit, a team that has not recorded a victory in Wisconsin since 1991.

With their 5th straight win over the Lions, the Packers finished the season with a record of 13–3. The 13-win season was the fourth in the history of the Packer team (1997, 1996, and 1962 were the others).

On January 2, 2008, Brandon Jackson was voted NFL Rookie of the Week for games played December 29–30, 2007. Jackson ran the ball 20 times for 113 yards and made two receptions for 22 yards in the Packers' 34–13 win over the Detroit Lions.

On January 3, 2008, the NFL announced McCarthy finished second in voting for The Associated Press 2007 NFL Coach of the Year, garnering 15 votes to Bill Belichick's leading 29 votes.

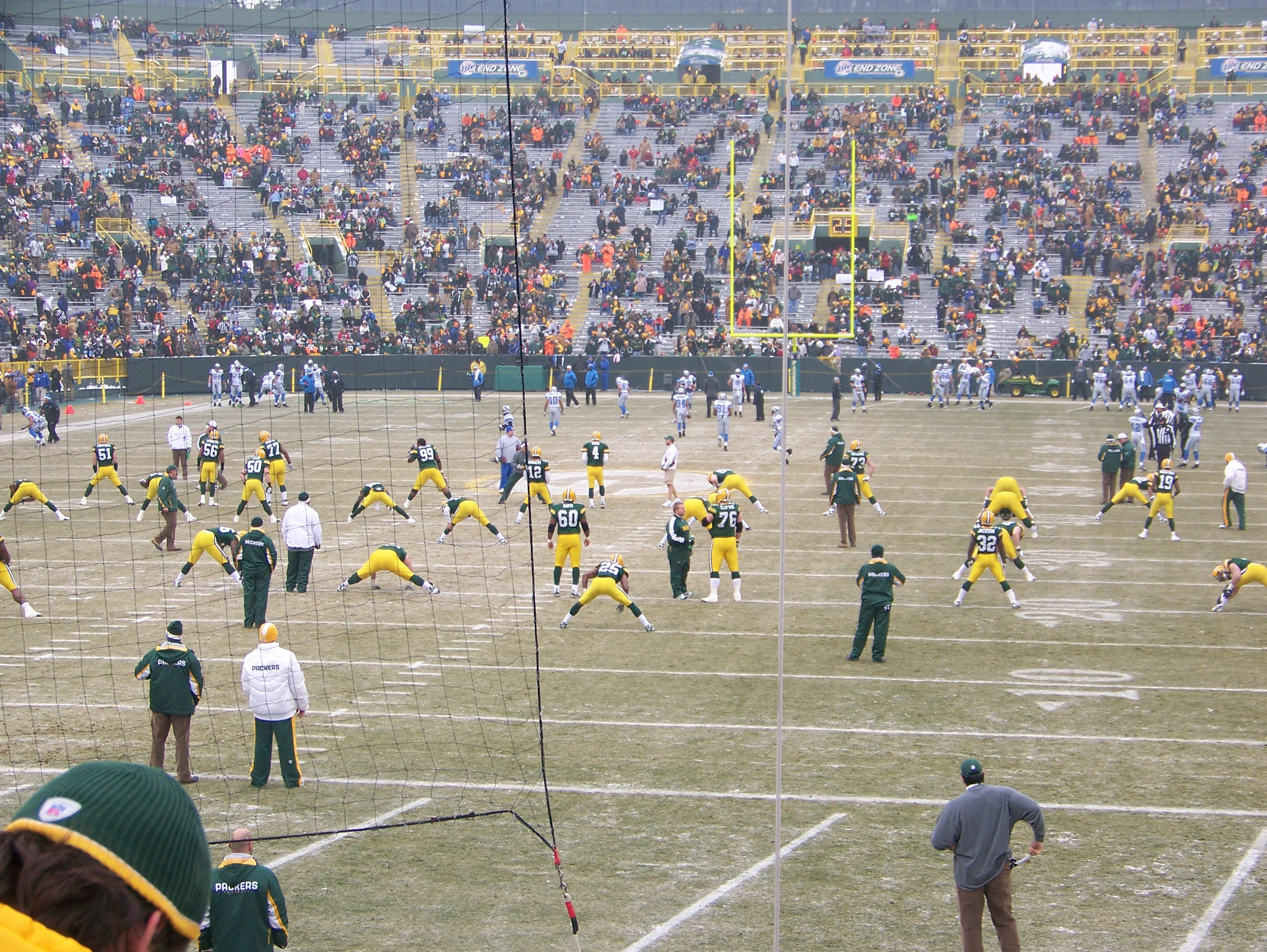
Packers warm up

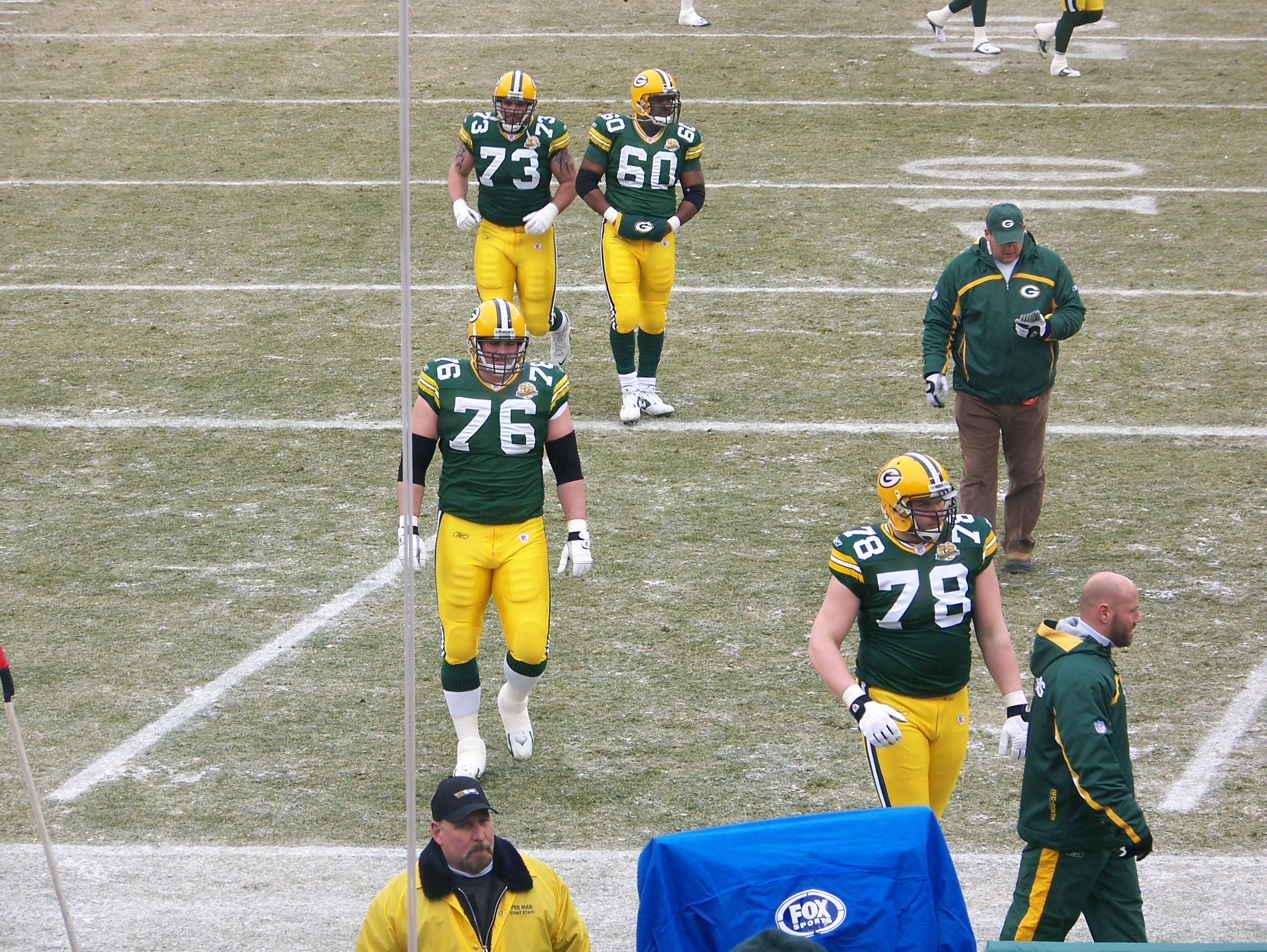
Prior to kickoff

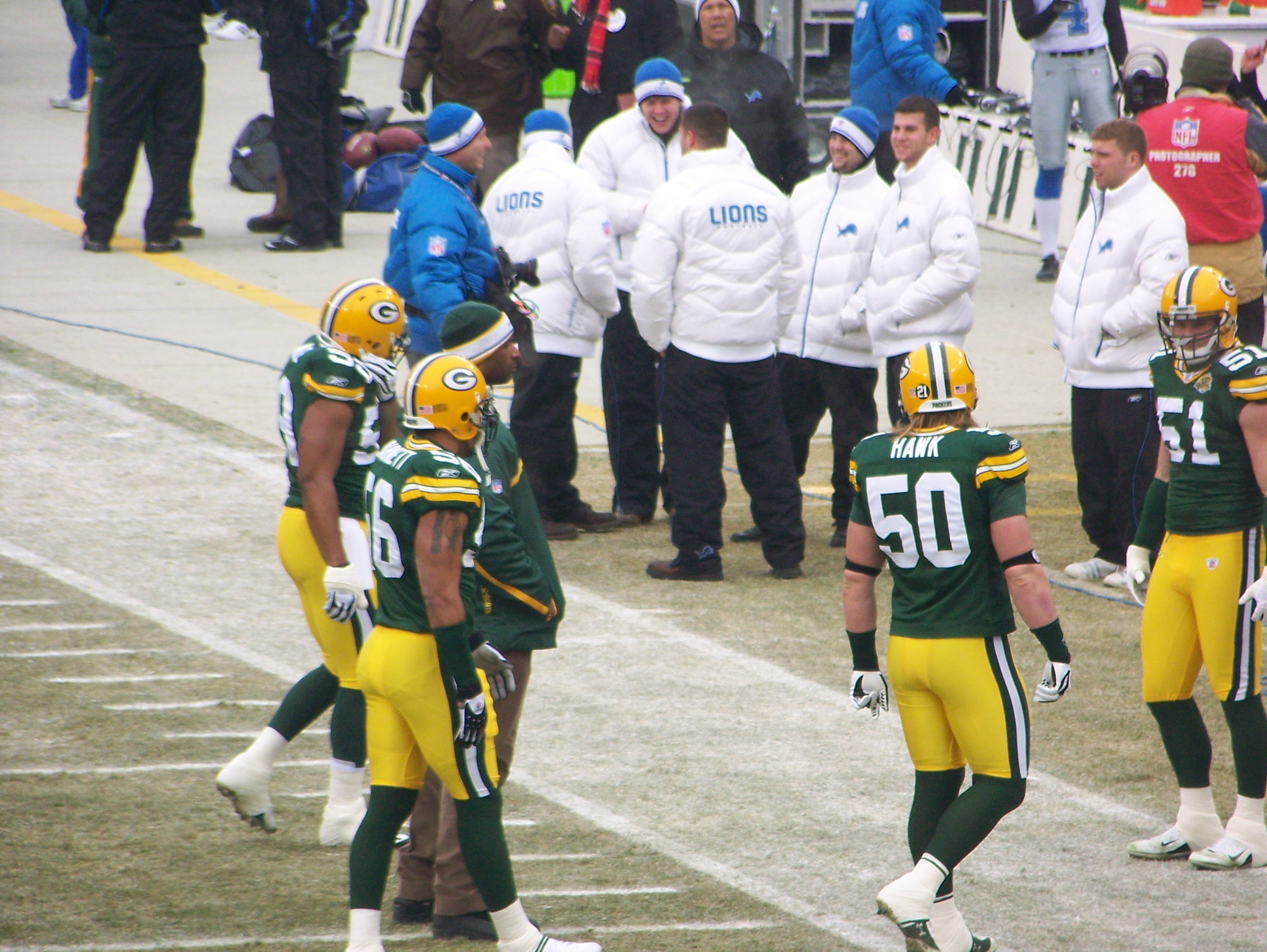
Nick Barnett (56), A. J. Hawk (50) and Brady Poppinga (51)

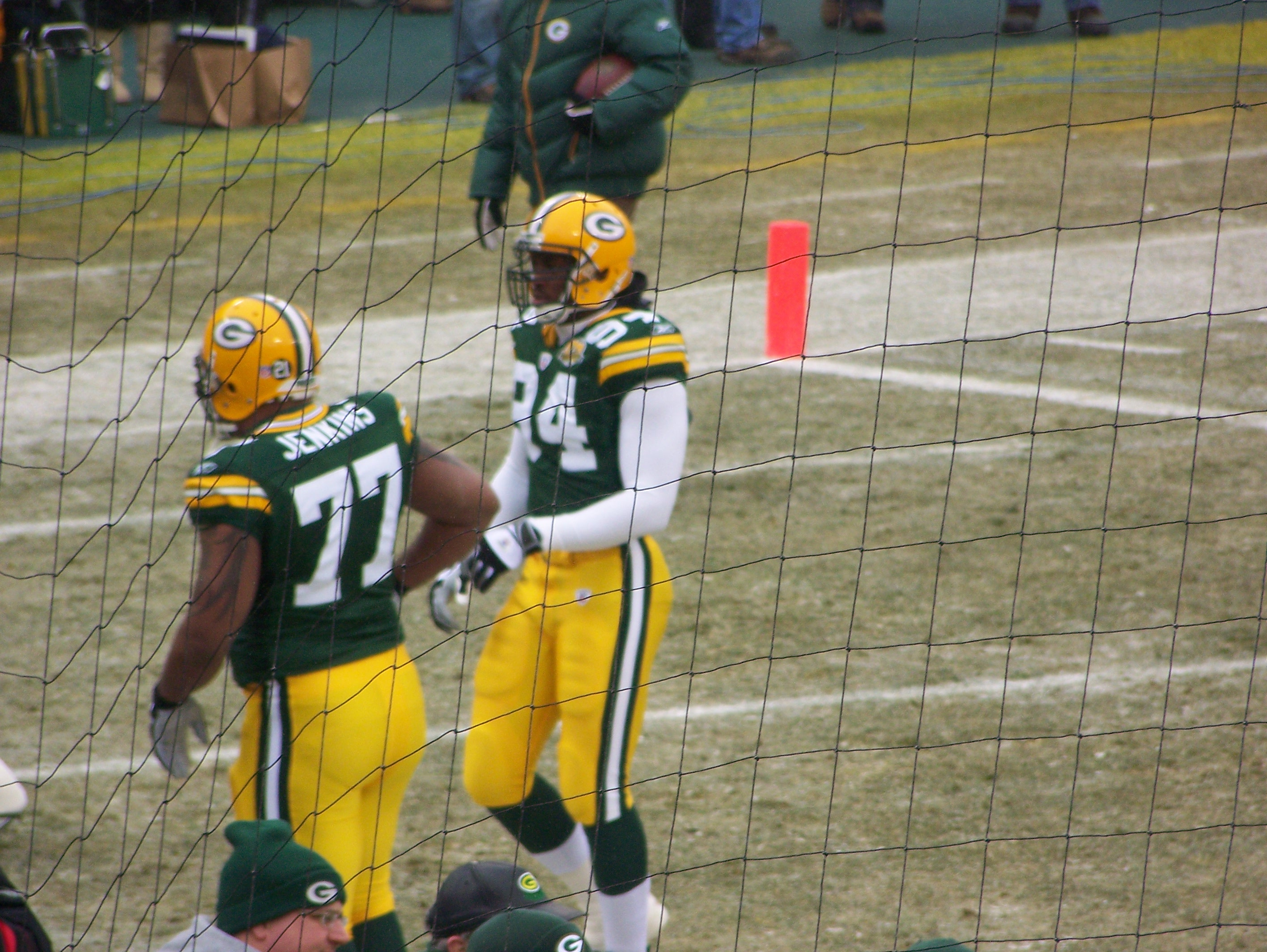
Cullen Jenkins and Kabeer Gbaja Biamila

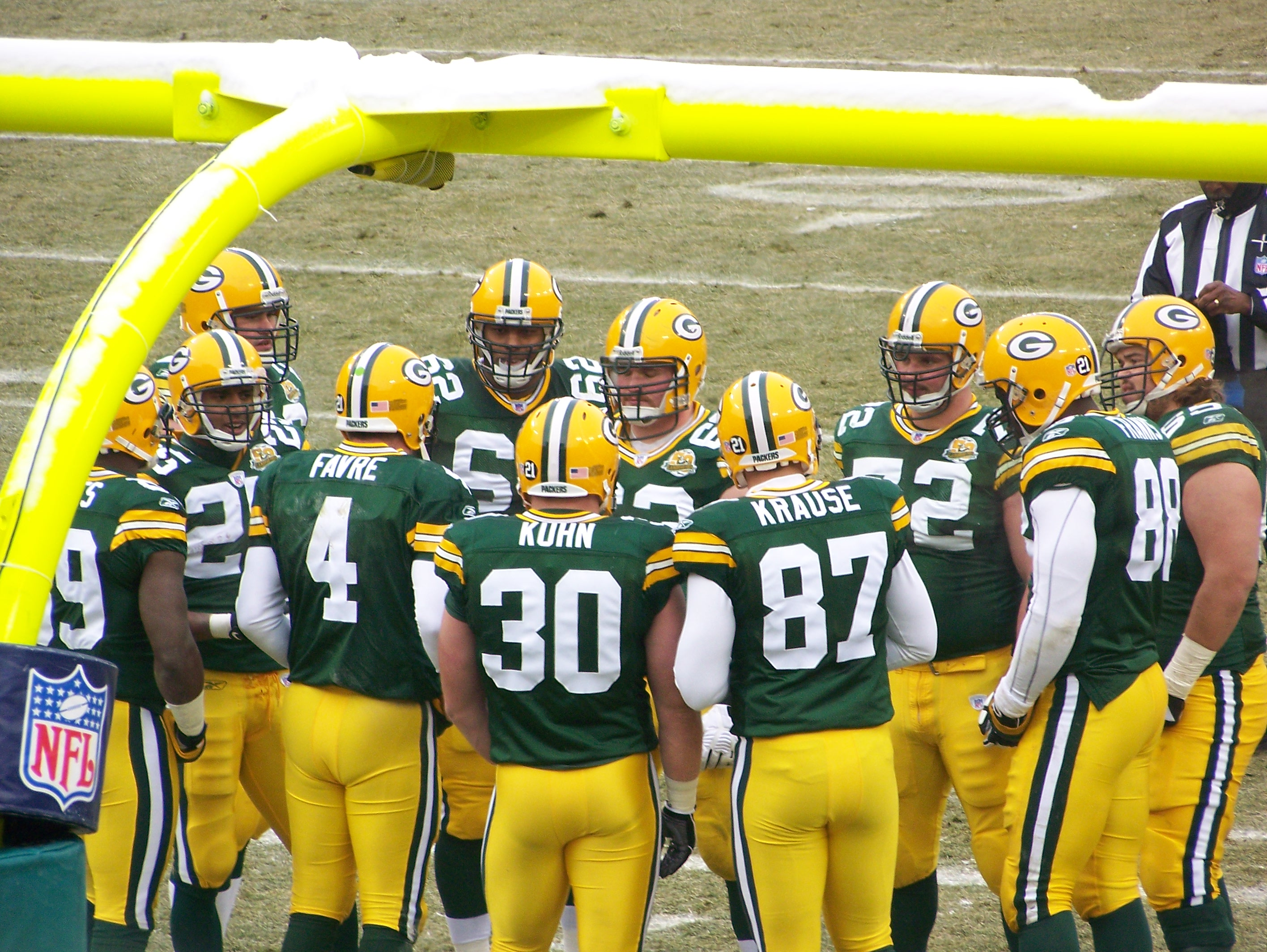
Packers offense in a huddle, week 17

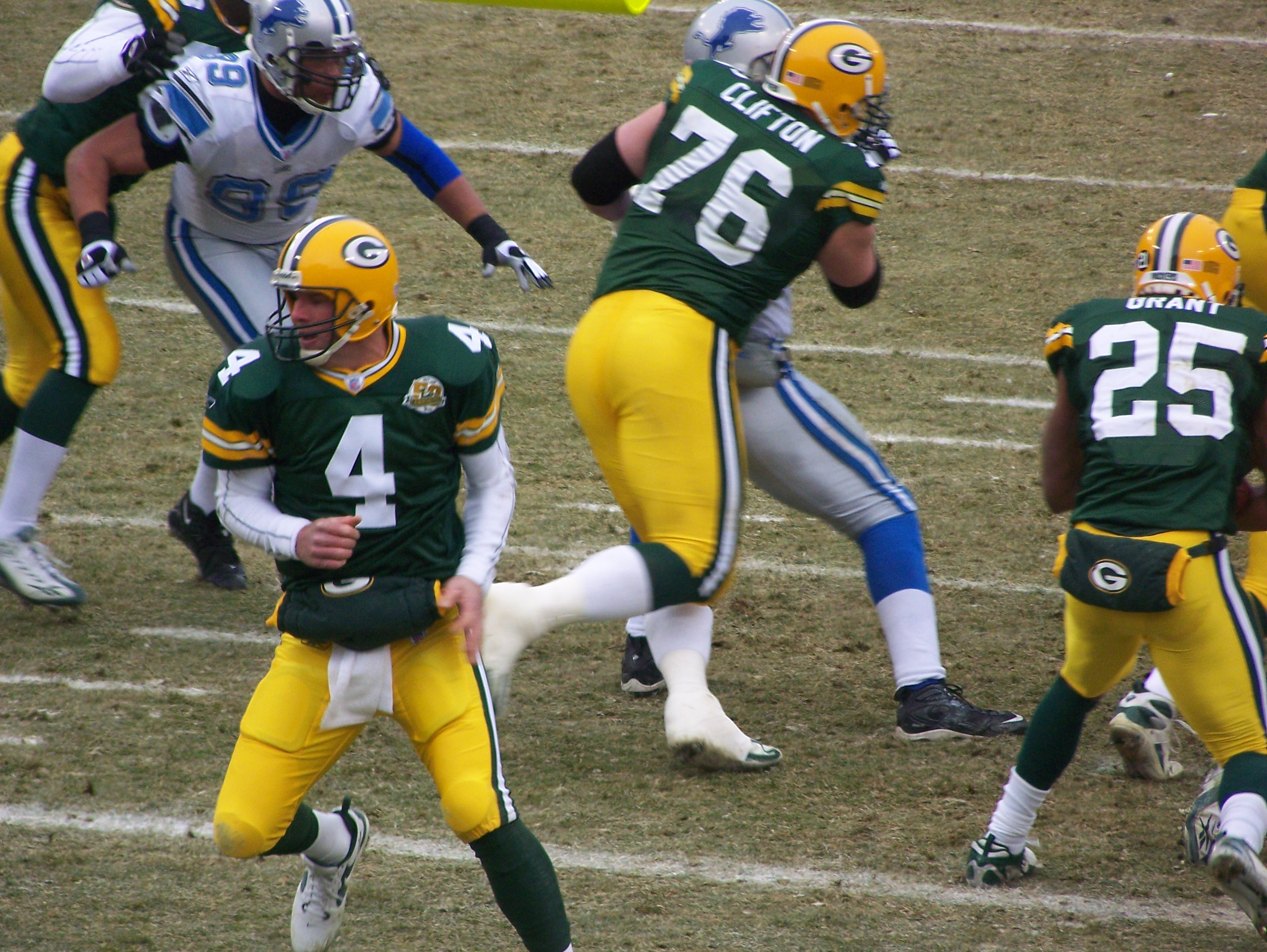
Brett Favre, Ryan Grant, and Chad Clifton

== Playoffs ==
Playoff round	Date	Opponent (seed)	Result	Record	Game site	NFL.com recap
Divisional	January 12, 2008	Seattle Seahawks (3)	W 42–20	1–0	Lambeau Field	Recap
NFC Championship	January 20, 2008	New York Giants (5)	L 20–23 (OT)	1–1	Lambeau Field	Recap

=== Divisional Round: Seattle Seahawks ===
Quarter	1	2	3	4	Total
Seahawks	14	3	3	0	20
Packers	14	14	7	7	42

at Lambeau Field, Green Bay, Wisconsin

- Game time: 4:30 PM EDT
- Game weather: 28 °F (−2 °C) (heavy snow)
- Game attendance: 72,168
- Referee: Mike Carey
- TV announcers (Fox): Kenny Albert (play-by-play), Daryl Johnston (color commentator), & Tony Siragusa (sideline reporter)

Mike Holmgren and the Seattle Seahawks played the Green Bay Packers for a chance to play in the NFC Championship game. The Packers beat the Seahawks 42–20. Ryan Grant fumbled twice in the first 69 seconds, the turnovers led to an early 14–0 Seahawk lead. Grant redeemed himself by running for 201 yards and three touchdowns – both franchise playoff records (Ahman Green had run for 156 yards in a 2004 playoff game). Brett Favre went 18-for-23 for 173 yards and three touchdowns, two to Greg Jennings, joining Joe Montana as the only passers in league history with 5,000 yards in postseason play. Other Packer team records set during the game include most points in a game with 42, most touchdowns with six, and most first downs with 25.

=== NFC Championship: New York Giants ===
Quarter	1	2	3	4	OT	Total
Giants	3	3	14	0	3	23
Packers	0	10	7	3	0	20

at Lambeau Field, Green Bay, Wisconsin

- Game time: 6:30 PM EDT
- Game weather: −1 to −40 °F (−18 to −40 °C) wind chill
- Game attendance: 72,740
- Referee: Terry McAulay
- TV announcers (Fox): Joe Buck (play-by-play), Troy Aikman (color commentator), Chris Myers and Pam Oliver (field reporters)

The Green Bay Packers were defeated by the New York Giants at Lambeau Field in overtime. It was the 3rd coldest game in NFL history at the time. Favre extended his NFL record to 18 straight playoff games with at least one touchdown pass. It came on a 90-yard touchdown throw to Donald Driver, the longest playoff pass in Packers team history. This would also be the final game in Favre's legendary career as a Green Bay Packer. This was also the last time the Packers hosted the NFC Championship until the 2020 season.

== Season statistical leaders ==
- Passing Yards: Brett Favre 4,155 Yards
- Passing Touchdowns: Brett Favre 28 TD
- Rushing Yards: Ryan Grant, 956 Yards
- Rushing Touchdowns: Ryan Grant, 8 TD
- Receiving Yards: Donald Driver, 1,048 Yards
- Receiving Touchdowns: Greg Jennings, 12 TD
- Points: Mason Crosby, 141 points
- Kickoff Return Yards: Tramon Williams, 684 Yards
- Punt Return Yards: Charles Woodson, 268 Yards
- Tackles: Nick Barnett, 131 Tackles
- Sacks: Aaron Kampman, 12 Sacks
- Interceptions: Atari Bigby, 5 Interceptions

== Awards and records ==
=== Awards ===
- Brett Favre was named Sports Illustrated Sportsman of the Year.
- Brett Favre was named FedEx Air Player of the Year.
- Brett Favre was awarded Fox's Galloping Gobbler Award.
- Brett Favre was voted 5x for the FedEx Air NFL Player of the Week.
- Mason Crosby was named NFC Special Teams Player of the Week for games played on Week 1.
- Brett Favre was named NFC Offensive Player of the Week for games played September 16–17
- Mike McCarthy was voted the Motorola NFL Coach of the Week for games played on September 16–17.
- Nick Barnett was voted the GMC Defensive Player of the Week for games played on September 23–24.
- Brett Favre was named the NFC Offensive Player of the Week for games played on Week 4.
- Charles Woodson was named the NFC's Defensive Player of the Week for games played on Week 6.
- Aaron Kampman was named the NFC Defensive Player of the Month for October.
- James Jones was announced as the Diet Pepsi 2007 Rookie of the Week for games played on October 28–29.
- Mike mccarthy was voted the motorola nfl coach of the week for games played on November 11–12.
- Tramon Williams was named Special Teams Players of the Week for games played on November 18–19.
- Corey Williams was voted the GMC Defensive Player of the Week for games played on November 18–19.
- Will Blackmon was awarded NFC Special Teams Player of the Week honors for games played on Week 14.
- Atari Bigby was voted the GMC Defensive Player of the Week for games played on December 13–17.
- Mason Crosby was voted the Diet Pepsi NFL Rookie of the Week for games played on December 13–17.
- Brandon Jackson was voted NFL Rookie of the Week for games played December 29–30.
- Atari Bigby was voted NFC Defensive Player of the Month for games played in December.
- Chris Francies was the winner of the Packers' Ed Block Courage Award.
- Mike McCarthy was voted 2007 NFL Alumni's Coach of the Year.
- Mike McCarthy was voted 2007 Motorola NFL Coach of the Year.

=== Records ===
==== Individual ====
- Brett Favre surpassed John Elway as the leagues's all-time leader in career wins as a starter.
- Brett Favre surpassed Dan Marino as the league's all-time leader in touchdown passes.
- Brett Favre set the league record for most pass attempts in a career.
- Brett Favre surpassed George Blanda as the league's all-time leader in interceptions thrown.
- Brett Favre set the league record for the most career touchdown passes of 75 yards or more.
- Brett Favre joined Tom Brady and Peyton Manning as the only quarterbacks who've beaten all 31 other teams in the NFL.
- Brett Favre surpassed Dan Marino as the league's all-time leader in career 3 touchdown games.
- Brett Favre surpassed Don Majkowski and Lynn Dickey setting the Packers record of most consecutive completions in a game with 20.
- Brett Favre surpassed himself setting the Packers record for Highest Completion Percentage, Season (140 att.) with 66.54%.
- Brett Favre tied Don Majkowski for the team record of Most Attempts, No Interceptions, Game with 46 vs. Min on November 11, 2007.
- Will Blackmon became only the second player in league history to return a punt and a fumble for a touchdown in the same game.
- Brett Favre surpassed Dan Marino as the league's all-time leader in career passing yards.
- Brett Favre joined Joe Montana as the only passers in league history to eclipse 5,000 passing yards in career postseason play.
- Mason Crosby lead the NFL in points scored with 141.
- Mason Crosby broke the team record of Most Points, No Touchdowns, Season with 141.
- Mason Crosby broke the team record of Most Points, Rookie, Season with 141.
- Ryan Grant broke the franchise playoff rushing yards in playoff game record with 201 yards against the Seattle Seahawks.
- Ryan Grant broke the franchise rushing touchdowns in a playoff game record with 3 touchdowns against the Seattle Seahawks.
- Nick Barnett tied Brian Noble and Bernardo Harris for the team record of, Tackles, Most Seasons Leading Team (1975–2007) with 4.

==== Team ====
- Most Games Won, Regular Season: 13 (1962, 1996, 1997 also won 13)
- Most First Downs Allowed By Penalty, Season: 44
- Most First Downs, Passing, Game: 22 vs. Minnesota, November 11, 2007
- Most Games, 300 Net Yards Passing, Season: 7
- Most Consecutive Games, 300 Net Yards Passing: 3 (twice) (1984, 2004 also had 3 consecutive)
- Highest Completion Percentage, Season: 66.26% (383 completions in 578 attempts)
- Most TD, Opponents' Fumbles Recovered, Season: 3 (2004 also had 3)

=== 2008 Pro Bowl selections ===
The Packers had five 2008 Pro Bowl selections, 9th most in the NFL. Head coach Mike McCarthy was also the coach of the NFC.

Position	Player	Team
Quarterback	Brett Favre^{[a]}	Starter
Wide receiver	Donald Driver	Reserve
Offensive Tackle	Chad Clifton^{[b]}	Reserve
Defensive end	Aaron Kampman	Starter
Cornerback	Al Harris	Starter

Notes:

^{a} Injured player; selected but did not play
^{b} Replacement selection due to injury or vacancy

=== 2007 All-Pro selections ===
The following is a list of players that were named to the Associated Press 2007 All-Pro Team.

Position	Player	Team
Quarterback	Brett Favre	Second
Defensive end	Aaron Kampman	Second
Linebacker	Nick Barnett	Second
Cornerback	Al Harris	Second

=== Hall of Fame Inductions ===
In July 2007 the following players were inducted into the Green Bay Packers Hall of Fame

- Robert Brooks, WR, 1992–98
- LeRoy Butler, SS, 1990–2001
