= Atari Bigby =

American football player (born 1981)

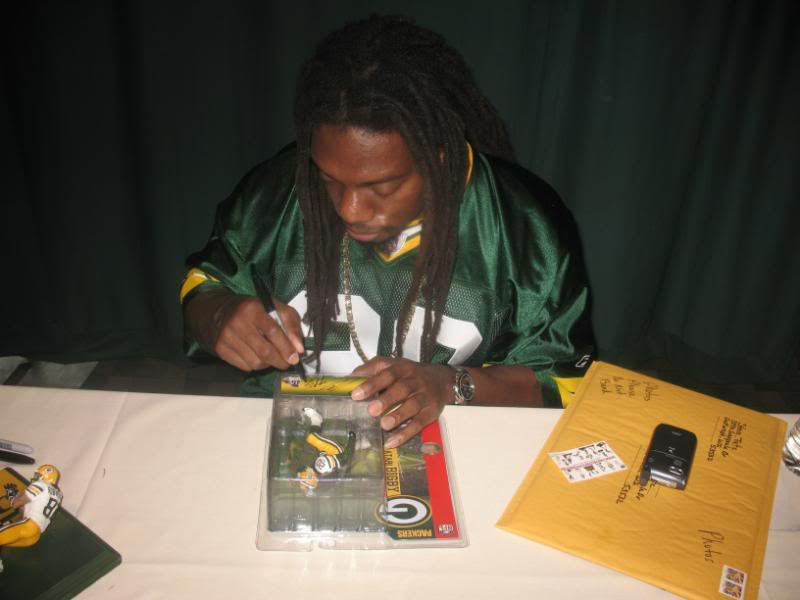
- Bigby in 2008

No. 47, 20, 27, 26
- Position: Safety

Personal information
- Born: September 19, 1981 (age 45); Trelawny Parish, Jamaica
- Listed height: 5 ft 11 in (1.80 m)
- Listed weight: 213 lb (97 kg)

Career information
- High school: Miami Senior (Miami, Florida, U.S.)
- College: UCF
- NFL draft: 2005: undrafted

Career history
- Miami Dolphins (2005)*; New York Jets (2005)*; Green Bay Packers (2005–2010); → Amsterdam Admirals (2006); Seattle Seahawks (2011); San Diego Chargers (2012)
- * Offseason or practice squad member only

Awards and highlights
- Super Bowl champion (XLV); 2× First-team All-MAC (2002, 2003)

Career NFL statistics
- Total tackles: 250
- Sacks: 1
- Forced fumbles: 3
- Fumble recoveries: 3
- Interceptions: 10
- Stats at Pro Football Reference

Atari David Bigby (born September 19, 1981) is a former American football safety. He was signed by the Miami Dolphins as an undrafted free agent in 2005 after playing college football at the University of Central Florida (UCF).

Bigby was also a member of the New York Jets, Green Bay Packers, Seattle Seahawks, and the San Diego Chargers. He won Super Bowl XLV defeating the Pittsburgh Steelers.

== Early life ==
Bigby attended Miami High School in Miami, Florida, where he lettered three years in football and two in track, and also competed as a standout soccer player. He attended high school alongside several future professional athletes, including safety Marquand Manuel, Houston Texans wide receiver Andre Johnson, Tampa Bay Buccaneers wide receiver Roscoe Parrish, Philadelphia Eagles offensive lineman Jamaal Jackson, and Miami Heat forward Udonis Haslem.

As a prep player, Bigby played every position on the field except lineman. During his senior year, he recorded 72 tackles, four forced fumbles, and one interception on defense, while adding 500 receiving yards, 315 rushing yards, and nine touchdowns on offense. He earned second-team Class 6A all-state honors and also played in the Dade-Broward All-Star Game.

== College career ==
As a redshirt freshman at the University of Central Florida, Bigby played in 11 games and recorded 38 tackles. During his time at UCF, he earned All-Conference honors twice in the Mid-American Conference (MAC).

== Professional career ==
=== Miami Dolphins ===
After going undrafted in the 2005 NFL draft, Bigby was signed by the Miami Dolphins as an undrafted free agent on May 16, 2005. He was later waived by the Dolphins on July 25, 2005, prior to the start of the preseason.

=== New York Jets ===
Bigby was signed by the New York Jets on August 11, 2005. He was waived during final roster cuts on September 3, despite a standout performance in training camp.

=== Green Bay Packers ===
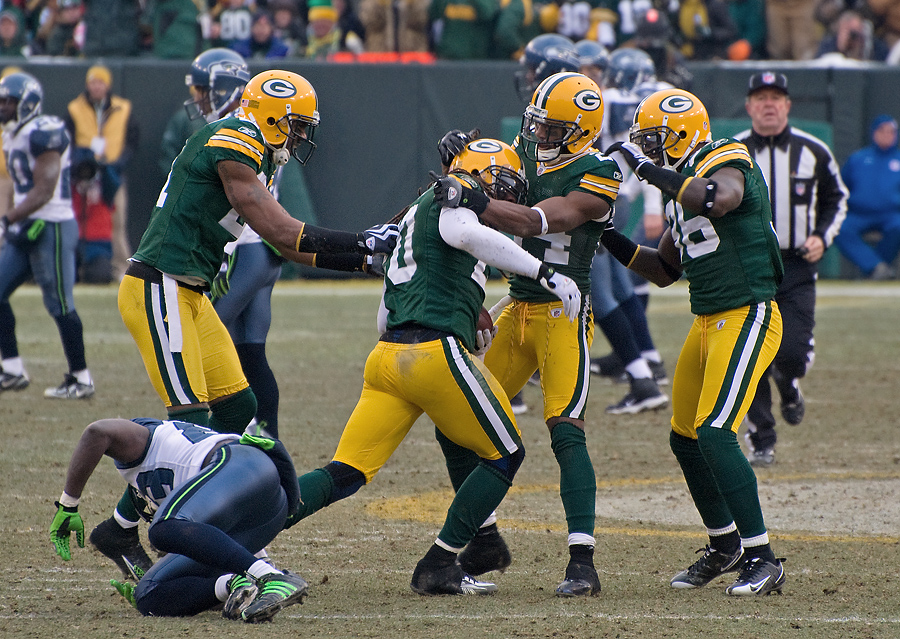
Bigby celebrating an interception in 2009

Bigby was originally signed to the Packers' practice squad on November 1, 2005. He was promoted to the active roster on December 22, 2005, and made his NFL debut on December 25 against the Chicago Bears.

Bigby was waived by the Packers at the end of the 2006 preseason,re-signed to the practice squad two days later. After spending the first ten weeks of the season on the Packers' practice squad, he was signed to the active roster on November 15, 2006. He recorded two tackles during the season. Bigby also played in NFL Europe for the Amsterdam Admirals, representing the Green Bay Packers.

After a very successful 2007 training camp and preseason, Bigby replaced starting strong safety Marquand Manuel, who was released prior to the 2007 regular season. Bigby was named the NFC Defensive Player of the month for December 2007. He tied for the NFL lead with four interceptions during the month in just four games. The Packers posted a 3–1 record in December and clinched the NFC North division, securing the No. 2 seed in the NFC playoffs. Bigby recorded an interception in three of Green Bay's four December games, including a 22-yard interception in Week 14 and a career-high two interceptions the following week against St. Louis. He added another interception in the Packers' win over Detroit.

On January 12, Bigby started his first playoff game against the Seattle Seahawks. He finished the game with seven tackles (one for a loss), a forced fumble, and a pass defensed. He delivered two notable hits, including one that caused a fumble by Marcus Pollard that was recovered by defensive end Aaron Kampman, leading to a Packers scoring drive.

An exclusive-rights free agent in the 2008 offseason, Bigby signed a one-year tender deal with the Packers.

Bigby recorded the Packers’ first interception of the 2008 season in the opener against the Minnesota Vikings on Monday Night Football, picking off quarterback Tarvaris Jackson in the fourth quarter. He played in just seven games during the season due to injuries and was placed on season-ending injured reserve with a shoulder injury on December 18. Bigby finished the 2008 season with 21 tackles, two pass deflections, and an interception.

Bigby won his first Super Bowl when the Packers defeated the Pittsburgh Steelers in Super Bowl XLV. He was the first player to emerge from the tunnel when the Packers were introduced.

=== Seattle Seahawks ===
Bigby signed with the Seattle Seahawks on August 16, 2011, and played in 15 regular season games.

=== San Diego Chargers ===
Bigby signed with the San Diego Chargers on March 16, 2012.

=== Career statistics ===
Career statistics				Tackles				Interceptions			Other	
Season	Team	G	GS	Solo	Ast	Total	Sack	Int	Yds	Long	FF	PDef
2005	GB	1	0	0	0	0	0	0	0	0	0	0
2006	GB	5	0	1	1	2	0	0	0	0	0	0
2007	GB	16	16	66	20	86	0	5	50	22	3	9
2008	GB	7	6	15	6	21	0	1	7	7	0	2
2009	GB	13	11	37	12	49	0	4	14	14	0	8
2010	GB	4	0	6	0	6	0	0	0	0	0	0
2011	SEA	15	2	12	6	18	1.0	0	0	0	0	2
2012	SD	11	11	49	19	68	0	0	0	0	0	3
Career		46	33	125	39	164	1.0	10	71	22	3	24

== Personal life ==
Atari Bigby was born in Jamaica and moved to the United States at age four. He was named by his grandmother, who chose the name "Atari", a Japanese term that means “to hit a target,” similar to the English expression “bullseye”. He has five children: two daughters, Michelle and Lena, and three sons, Kente Atari Bigby, David Atari Bigby, and Joshua Atari Bigby. Bigby is a dedicated father and co-parents his five children.
