= Cullen Jenkins =

American football player (born 1981)

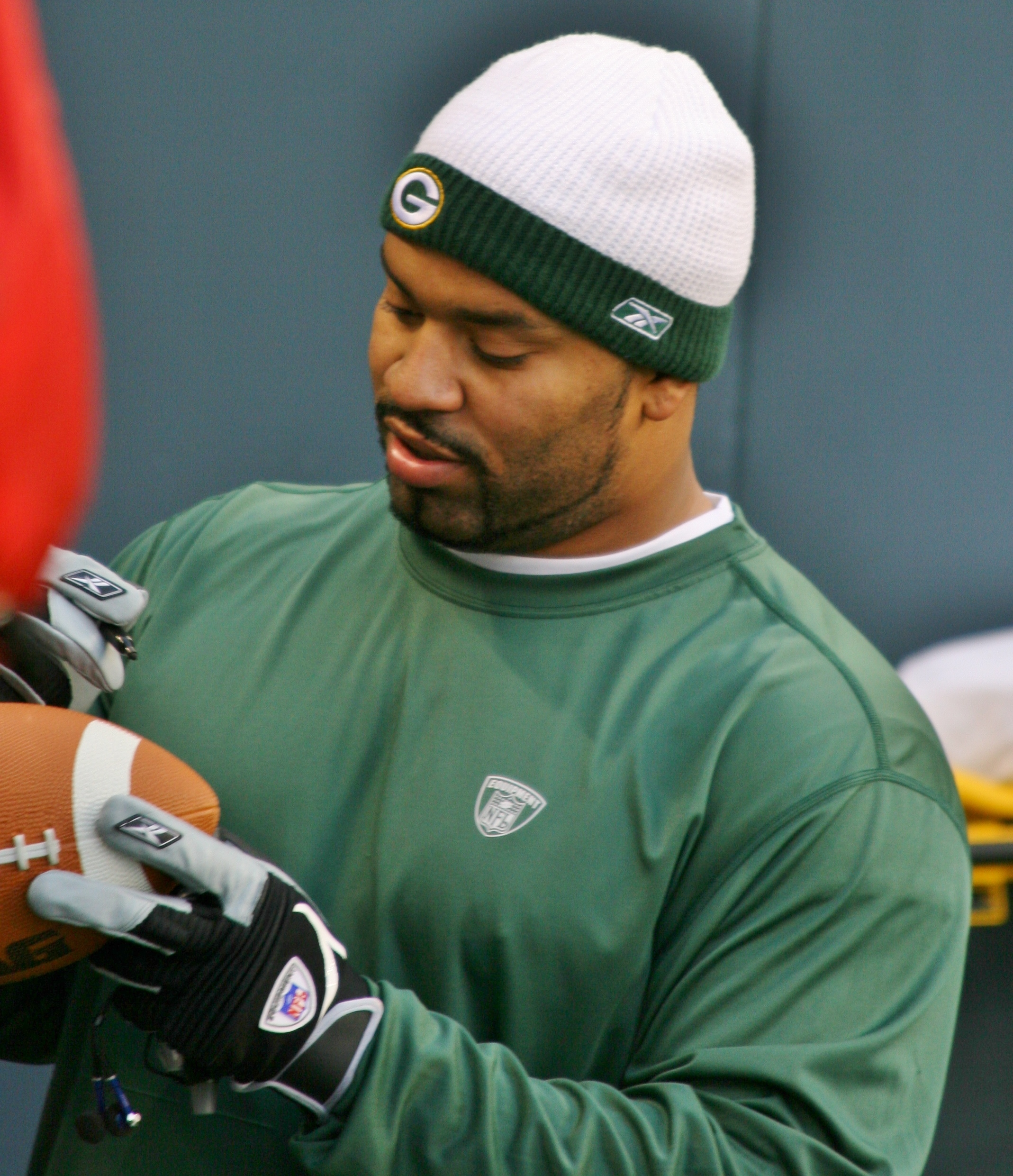
- Jenkins with the Green Bay Packers in 2006

No. 77, 97, 99, 73
- Position: Defensive end

Personal information
- Born: January 20, 1981 (age 45); Detroit, Michigan, U.S.
- Listed height: 6 ft 2 in (1.88 m)
- Listed weight: 305 lb (138 kg)

Career information
- High school: Belleville (MI)
- College: Central Michigan (1999–2002)
- NFL draft: 2003: undrafted

Career history
- Green Bay Packers (2003)*; → Cologne Centurions (2004); Green Bay Packers (2004–2010); Philadelphia Eagles (2011–2012); New York Giants (2013–2015); Washington Redskins (2016)
- * Offseason or practice squad member only

Awards and highlights
- Super Bowl champion (XLV)

Career NFL statistics
- Total tackles: 348
- Sacks: 49.0
- Forced fumbles: 8
- Fumble recoveries: 9
- Pass deflections: 20
- Interceptions: 1
- Stats at Pro Football Reference

Cullen Darome Jenkins (born January 20, 1981) is an American former professional football player who was a defensive end in the National Football League (NFL). He played college football for the Central Michigan Chippewas and was signed by the Green Bay Packers as an undrafted free agent in 2003. In his last year as a Packer, Jenkins won Super Bowl XLV over the Pittsburgh Steelers. He also played for the Philadelphia Eagles, New York Giants, and Washington Redskins.

== Early life ==
Both he and his brother Kris Jenkins played at Belleville High School under Bob LaPointe.

== College career ==
Jenkins played college football for Central Michigan University, where he recorded 40 tackles, seven tackles for a loss, 4½ sacks, and two passes defensed during his senior year.

== Professional career ==
=== Green Bay Packers ===
After going undrafted in the 2003 NFL draft, Jenkins signed with the Green Bay Packers on May 2, 2003. One year later, after an impressive NFL Europe season and strong training camp, Jenkins landed a spot on the Packers' roster. From 2004 to November 2006, Jenkins was the backup for Kabeer Gbaja-Biamila, and took over the starting role the final month of the 2006 season. As the starter for the last month of games, he recorded a career-high 6½ sacks that year, including his first three-sack game vs. Detroit on December 17, 2006.

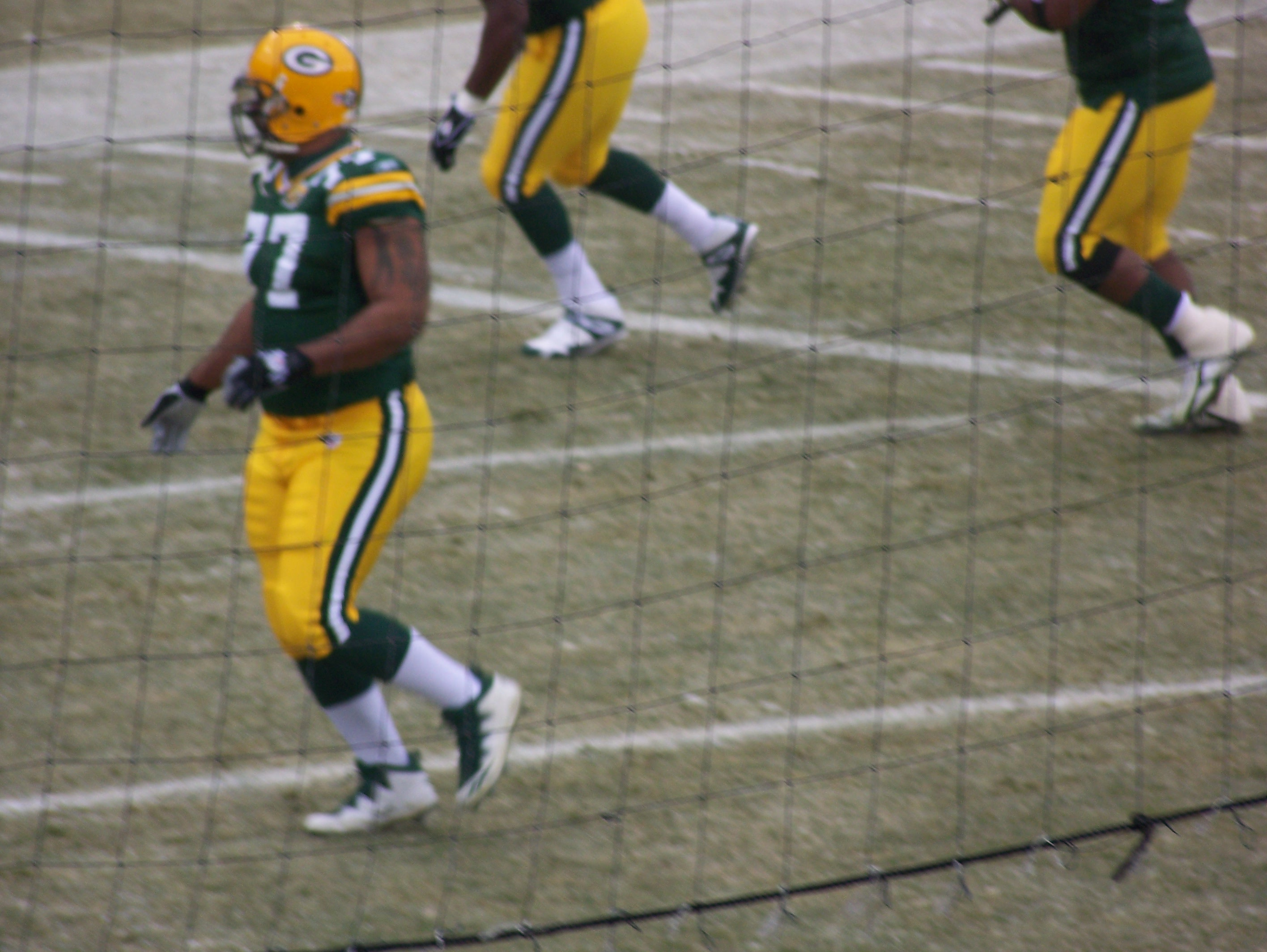
Jenkins with the Packers in 2007

On February 26, 2007, Jenkins signed a four-year, $16 million contract extension. Jenkins batted down nine passes in 2007, the most by a Packers defensive lineman since the team began recording the statistic in 1980. He also finished 2007 with 26 total combined tackles and one sack.

In the 2008 season, the Packers decided to start Jenkins rather than Gbaja-Biamila for the second season in a row. He could only play four games though, before he suffered a torn pectoral muscle against the Tampa Bay Buccaneers on September 28, 2008. Two days later, he was placed on injured reserve. During his injury-shorted 2008 year, Jenkins had 13 tackles, 2.5 sacks, a pass defended, and a forced fumble.

In the 2009 season, Jenkins returned as a starting defensive end because the Packers had switched from a 4–3 to a 3-4 defense. Jenkins started all 16 games in 2009 with 32 tackles, 4.5 sacks, a pass defended, an interception, and three forced fumbles.

In the 2010 season Jenkins missed five games with a calf injury. He appeared in 11 games (started six) with 18 total combined tackles, seven sacks, and one pass defended. Jenkins was part of a major role of the Packers' 3-4 defense during their postseason run where they eventually won Super Bowl XLV, their first world championship in 14 years.

=== Philadelphia Eagles ===
The Philadelphia Eagles signed Jenkins to a five-year, $25 million contract on July 30, 2011. In 2011, he recorded 5.5 sacks, 24 hurries, and seven tackles-for-loss. He agreed to a restructured contract on February 21, 2012, with the new contract running through the 2014 season instead of the 2015 season. On February 25, 2013, the Eagles declined his roster bonus, making him a free agent.

=== New York Giants ===
On March 10, 2013, Jenkins was signed to a three-year contract by the New York Giants.

=== Washington Redskins ===
On August 29, 2016, Jenkins signed a one-year contract with the Washington Redskins. After playing one preseason game, he was released on September 3, 2016. He re-signed with the team on September 13.

== NFL career statistics ==
Legend
**Bold**	Career high

=== Regular season ===
Year	Team	Games		Tackles					Interceptions					Fumbles			
Year	Team	GP	GS	Cmb	Solo	Ast	Sck	TFL	Int	Yds	TD	Lng	PD	FF	FR	Yds	TD
2004	GNB	**16**	6	18	12	6	4.5	6	0	0	0	0	1	1	1	0	0
2005	GNB	**16**	12	37	23	14	3.0	5	0	0	0	0	5	0	1	-2	0
2006	GNB	14	5	32	23	9	6.5	7	0	0	0	0	1	0	**2**	0	0
2007	GNB	**16**	15	**44**	26	**18**	1.0	4	0	0	0	0	**6**	0	0	0	0
2008	GNB	4	4	13	10	3	2.5	4	0	0	0	0	1	1	0	0	0
2009	GNB	**16**	**16**	32	23	9	4.5	8	**1**	**4**	0	**4**	1	**3**	0	0	0
2010	GNB	11	8	18	13	5	**7.0**	6	0	0	0	0	1	0	0	0	0
2011	PHI	**16**	**16**	40	**33**	7	5.5	**11**	0	0	0	0	0	0	1	**3**	0
2012	PHI	**16**	**16**	26	22	4	4.0	7	0	0	0	0	1	1	1	0	0
2013	NYG	**16**	15	31	25	6	5.0	7	0	0	0	0	0	2	**2**	0	0
2014	NYG	12	11	15	7	8	1.0	3	0	0	0	0	1	0	1	0	0
2015	NYG	**16**	13	26	15	11	3.0	3	0	0	0	0	2	0	0	0	0
2016	WAS	15	0	16	10	6	1.5	5	0	0	0	0	0	0	0	0	0
Career		184	137	348	242	106	49.0	76	1	4	0	4	20	8	9	1	0

=== Playoffs ===
Year	Team	Games		Tackles					Interceptions					Fumbles			
Year	Team	GP	GS	Cmb	Solo	Ast	Sck	TFL	Int	Yds	TD	Lng	PD	FF	FR	Yds	TD
2004	GNB	1	0	2	1	1	0.0	1	0	0	0	0	0	0	0	0	0
2007	GNB	2	**2**	**8**	**6**	**2**	**1.5**	1	0	0	0	0	**1**	0	0	0	0
2009	GNB	1	1	1	0	1	0.0	0	0	0	0	0	0	0	0	0	0
2010	GNB	**4**	0	4	4	0	0.5	**3**	0	0	0	0	0	0	0	0	0
Career		8	3	15	11	4	2.0	5	0	0	0	0	1	0	0	0	0
