= Conrad Bolston =

American football player (born 1985)

No. 60, 93
- Position: Defensive tackle

Personal information
- Born: January 9, 1985 (age 41); Washington, D.C., U.S.
- Listed height: 6 ft 3 in (1.91 m)
- Listed weight: 304 lb (138 kg)

Career information
- College: Maryland
- NFL draft: 2007: undrafted

Career history
- Minnesota Vikings (2007); Green Bay Packers (2007–2008)

Career NFL statistics
- Total tackles: 3
- Stats at Pro Football Reference

Conrad Bolston (born January 9, 1985) is an American former professional football player who was a defensive tackle in the National Football League (NFL). He was originally signed by the Minnesota Vikings as an undrafted free agent in 2007. He played college football for the Maryland Terrapins.

== College career ==
Bolston played college football at the University of Maryland, College Park.

== Professional career ==
=== Minnesota Vikings ===
Bolston was signed as an undrafted free agent by the Minnesota Vikings in 2007. He spent the first 12 weeks of the 2007 season on the Vikings' practice squad. On November 28, 2007, he was signed the Vikings active roster and played in one game in which he had one tackle.

=== Green Bay Packers ===
On December 12, 2007, Bolston was signed off waivers from the Minnesota Vikings. Bolston remained on the Packers active roster for the remainder of the regular season and post season but only saw action in the last game of the regular season against the Detroit Lions. Bolston was cut from the Packers on August 31, 2008, when the team reduced their roster to 53 men and is currently a free agent.

== Personal ==
In September 2008, Bolston was diagnosed with spinal ependymoma. During rehabilitation, he retired from professional football and decided to attend law school. Bolston then worked as an assistant coach at St. John's College High School. In 2013, he graduated from Georgetown University Law Center and joined international law firm Vinson & Elkins LLP in 2018. In 2023, he joined the Federal Energy Regulatory Commission as senior counsel for environmental justice and equity.
