= 2011 Arizona Cardinals season =

NFL team season

- Owner: Bill Bidwill
- General manager: Rod Graves
- Head coach: Ken Whisenhunt
- Home stadium: University of Phoenix Stadium

Results
- Record: 8–8
- Division place: 2nd NFC West
- Playoffs: Did not qualify
- Pro Bowlers: Larry Fitzgerald, WR; Patrick Peterson, CB; Adrian Wilson, SS

Uniform
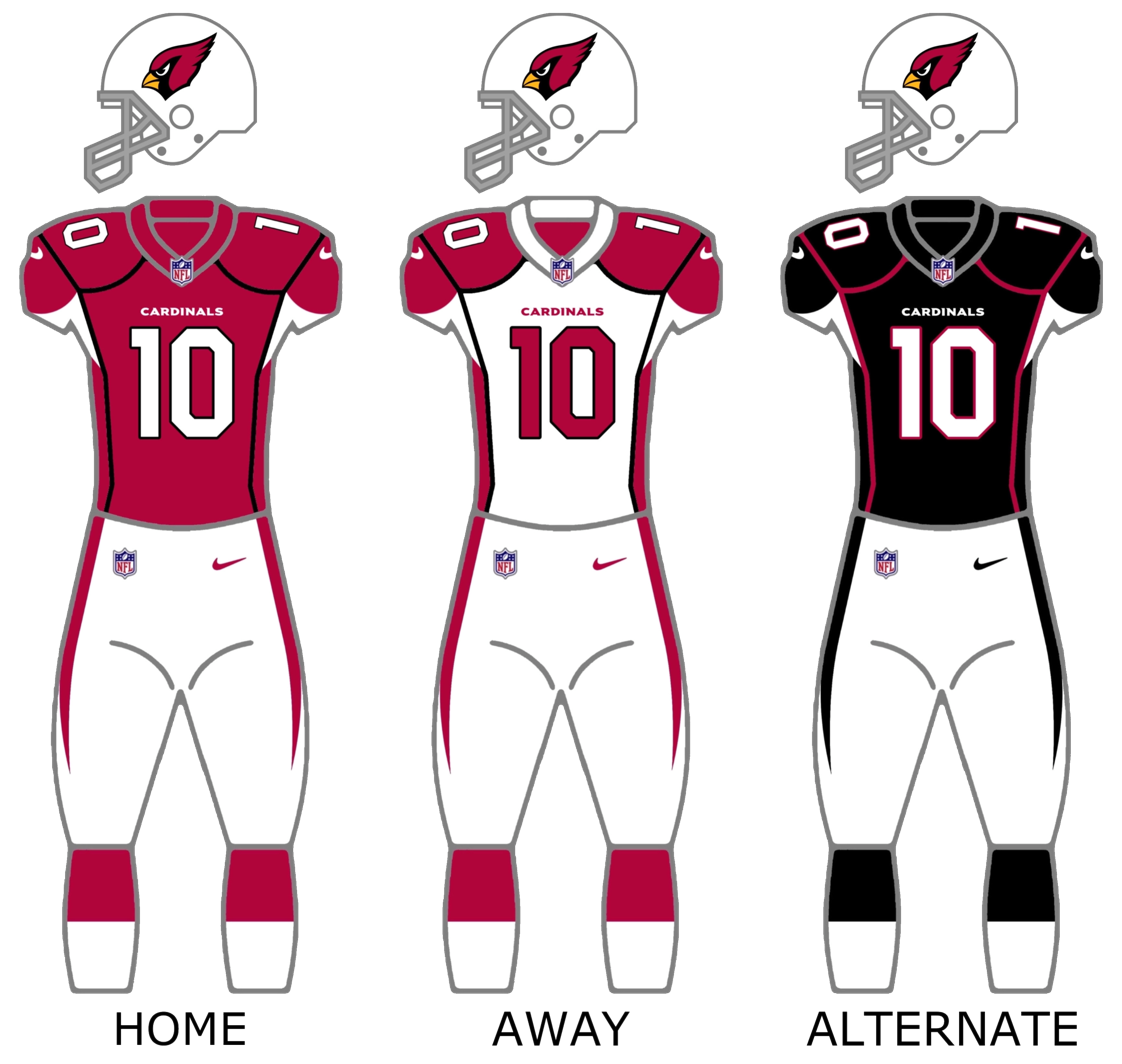

The 2011 season was the Arizona Cardinals' 92nd in the National Football League (NFL), their 24th in Arizona and their fifth under head coach Ken Whisenhunt. This was going to be the Cardinals first season with new starting quarterback Kevin Kolb, but he was injured and replaced by John Skelton. Despite a 1-6 start the Cardinals managed to win 7 out of 9 games, including a stunning upset against the San Francisco 49ers in week 14. The team improved on their 5–11 record from the 2010 season, but missed the playoffs for a second consecutive season.

The 2011 Cardinals won four overtime games, an NFL record that would later be matched by the 2021 Las Vegas Raiders.

== Offseason ==
=== Signings ===
Pos.	Player	2010 Team	Contract
G	Daryn Colledge	Green Bay Packers	5 years, $27.5 million
LB	Stewart Bradley	Philadelphia Eagles	5 years, $25 million
C	Lyle Sendlein	Arizona Cardinals	5 years, $16 million
TE	Jeff King	Carolina Panthers	3 years, $5.5 million
DE	Nick Eason	Pittsburgh Steelers	2 years, $1.9 million
S	Michael Adams	Arizona Cardinals	2 years, $1.7 million
G	Floyd Womack	Cleveland Browns	1 year, $1.7 million
RB	Chester Taylor	Chicago Bears	1 year, $810,000
CB	Matt Ware	Arizona Cardinals	1 year, $855,000
C	Ben Claxton	Arizona Cardinals	1 year, $700,000

=== Departures ===
Pos.	Player	2011 Team
WR	Steve Breaston	Kansas City Chiefs
DT	Alan Branch	Seattle Seahawks
G	Alan Faneca	
C	Ben Claxton	
QB	Derek Anderson	Carolina Panthers
CB	Dominique Rodgers-Cromartie	Philadelphia Eagles
RB	Jason Wright	
FB	Nehemiah Broughton	
TE	Stephen Spach	St. Louis Rams

=== 2011 NFL draft ===
Arizona Cardinals 2011 NFL Draft selections
Draft order			Player name	Position	Height	Weight	College
Round	Choice	Overall	Player name	Position	Height	Weight	College
1	5	5	Patrick Peterson	CB	6'0"	219 lbs.	LSU
2	6	38	Ryan Williams	RB	5'9"	212 lbs.	VT
3	5	69	Rob Housler	TE	6'5"	215 lbs.	FAU
4	6	103	Sam Acho	OLB	6'2"	262 lbs.	Texas
5	5	136	Anthony Sherman	RB	5'10"	242 lbs.	UConn
6	6	171	Quan Sturdivant	ILB	6'1"	241 lbs.	UNC
6	19	184 (Note: The Cardinals acquired this sixth-round selection (No. 184 overall) in a trade that sent guard Reggie Wells to the Philadelphia Eagles.)	David Carter	DE	6'5"	297 lbs.	UCLA
7 (Note: The Cardinals traded their original seventh-round selection (No. 208 overall) and a 2010 fourth-round selection to the New York Jets in exchange for safety Kerry Rhodes.)	46	249 (Note: Compensatory selection.)	DeMarco Sampson	WR	6'2"	204 lbs.	SDSU

=== Undrafted free agents ===
Name	Position	College
Jared Campbell	Safety	Miami (FL)
Daiveun Curry-Chapman	Wide receiver	Northern Arizona
Tommy Irvin	Safety	Wofford
Sean Jeffcoat	Wide receiver	Elon
Duke Lemmens	Linebacker	Florida
Ricky Lumpkin	Defensive tackle	Kentucky
Eric Mensik	Tackle	Oklahoma
Aaron Nichols	Wide receiver	Oregon State
Bryant Nnabuife	Cornerback	California
Kristofer O'Dowd	Center	USC
Stephen Skelton	Tight end	Fordham
Kendall Smith	Linebacker	Florida State
Jason Speredom	Tackle	BYU
Jake Vermiglio	Guard	NC State
D. J. Young	Tackle	Michigan State

=== Acquisitions ===
On July 28, 2011 the Cardinals acquired Kolb from the Philadelphia Eagles for CB Dominique Rodgers-Cromartie and a 2012 2nd-round pick. The next day they signed former Carolina Panthers starting CB Richard Marshall.

== Coaching staff ==
Arizona Cardinals 2011 staff
Front office: Owner/chairman – Bill Bidwill; President – Michael Bidwill; general manager – Rod Graves; Director of football administration – Reggie Terry; Director of player personnel – Steve Keim; Director of pro personnel – T. J. McCreight; Assistant director of pro personnel – Quentin Harris; Head coaches: Head coach – Ken Whisenhunt; Assistant head coach/run game coordinator/offensive line – Russ Grimm; Offensive coaches: Offensive coordinator – Mike Miller; Quarterbacks – Chris Miller; Running backs – Tommie Robinson; Wide receivers – John McNulty; Tight ends – Freddie Kitchens; Offensive quality control – Chad Grimm	Defensive coaches: Defensive coordinator – Ray Horton; Defensive line – Ron Aiken; Linebackers – Matt Raich; Defensive backs – Louie Cioffi; Assistant defensive backs – Deshea Townsend; Defensive quality control – Ryan Slowik; Special teams coaches: Special teams – Kevin Spencer; Strength and conditioning: Strength and conditioning – John Lott; Assistant strength and conditioning – Pete Alosi

== Final roster ==
2011 Arizona Cardinals roster
Quarterbacks (QB): 2 Richard Bartel; 4 Kevin Kolb; 19 John Skelton; Running backs (RB): 35 Anthony Sherman FB; 46 Alfonso Smith; 36 LaRod Stephens-Howling KR; 29 Chester Taylor; 26 Beanie Wells; Wide receivers (WR): 85 Early Doucet; 11 Larry Fitzgerald; 12 Andre Roberts; 89 DeMarco Sampson; 17 Chansi Stuckey; 18 Stephen Williams; Tight ends (TE): 81 Jim Dray; 86 Todd Heap; 84 Rob Housler; 87 Jeff King	Offensive linemen (OL): 74 D'Anthony Batiste T; 73 Jeremy Bridges T; 75 Levi Brown T; 71 Daryn Colledge G; 70 Rex Hadnot G; 76 Deuce Lutui G; 63 Lyle Sendlein C; 67 D. J. Young T; Defensive linemen (DL): 93 Calais Campbell DE; 79 David Carter NT; 90 Darnell Dockett DE; 98 Nick Eason; 91 Vonnie Holliday DE; 96 Ronald Talley DE	Linebackers (LB): 94 Sam Acho OLB; 52 Stewart Bradley ILB; 53 Clark Haggans OLB; 51 Paris Lenon ILB; 50 O'Brien Schofield OLB; 56 Reggie Walker ILB; 58 Daryl Washington ILB; 59 Brandon Williams OLB; Defensive backs (DB): 23 Hamza Abdullah SS; 27 Michael Adams CB; 37 Sean Considine SS; 30 Marshay Green CB; 20 A. J. Jefferson CB; 49 Rashad Johnson FS; 31 Richard Marshall CB; 21 Patrick Peterson; 25 Kerry Rhodes FS; 24 Adrian Wilson SS; Special teams (ST): 3 Jay Feely K; 82 Mike Leach LS; 9 Dave Zastudil P	Practice squad: 62 Ryan Bartholomew C; 83 Jaymar Johnson WR; 32 Korey Lindsey CB; 60 Ricky Lumpkin NT; 37 William Powell RB; 44 Steve Skelton TE; 54 Quan Sturdivant LB; Reserve: 22 Crezdon Butler CB (IR); 6 Max Hall QB (IR); 72 Brandon Keith T (IR); 55 Joey Porter OLB (IR); 28 Greg Toler CB (IR); 92 Dan Williams NT (IR); 34 Ryan Williams RB (IR); 78 Floyd Womack G (IR); Rookies in italics 53 active, 8 reserve, 7 practice squad

Defense

FS
Kerry Rhodes
Rashad Johnson

WLB	ILB	ILB	SLB
Clark Haggans	Paris Lenon	Daryl Washington	⋅
⋅	⋅	⋅	⋅

SS
Adrian Wilson
Hamza Abdullah

CB
Patrick Peterson
⋅

DE	NT	DE
Calais Campbell	Dan Williams	Darnell Dockett
⋅	⋅	⋅

CB
Richard Marshall
A.J. Jefferson

Offense

WR
Larry Fitzgerald
DeMarco Sampson

WR
⋅
⋅

LT	LG	C	RG	RT
Levi Brown	Daryn Colledge	Lyle Sendlein	Rex Hadnot	Brandon Keith
D'Anthony Batiste	D'Anthony Batiste	Rex Hadnot	Deuce Lutui	Jeremy Bridges

TE
Todd Heap
Jeff King

WR
Andre Roberts
Early Doucet

QB
Kevin Kolb
John Skelton

Special teams
PK Jay Feely
P Dave Zastudil
KR LaRod Stephens-Howling
PR Patrick Peterson
LS Mike Leach
H Dave Zastudil

RB
Beanie Wells
LaRod Stephens-Howling

== Preseason ==
=== Schedule ===
Week	Date	Opponent	Result	Record	Venue	Recap
1	August 11	at Oakland Raiders	W 24–18	1–0	O.co Coliseum	Recap
2	August 19	at Green Bay Packers	L 20–28	1–1	Lambeau Field	Recap
3	August 27	San Diego Chargers	L 31–34	1–2	University of Phoenix Stadium	Recap
4	September 1	Denver Broncos	W 26–7	2–2	University of Phoenix Stadium	Recap

== Regular season ==
=== Schedule ===
Week	Date	Opponent	Result	Record	Venue	Recap
1	September 11	Carolina Panthers	W 28–21	1–0	University of Phoenix Stadium	Recap
2	September 18	at Washington Redskins	L 21–22	1–1	FedExField	Recap
3	September 25	at Seattle Seahawks	L 10–13	1–2	CenturyLink Field	Recap
4	October 2	New York Giants	L 27–31	1–3	University of Phoenix Stadium	Recap
5	October 9	at Minnesota Vikings	L 10–34	1–4	Hubert H. Humphrey Metrodome	Recap
6	Bye					
7	October 23	Pittsburgh Steelers	L 20–32	1–5	University of Phoenix Stadium	Recap
8	October 30	at Baltimore Ravens	L 27–30	1–6	M&T Bank Stadium	Recap
9	November 6	St. Louis Rams	W 19–13 (OT)	2–6	University of Phoenix Stadium	Recap
10	November 13	at Philadelphia Eagles	W 21–17	3–6	Lincoln Financial Field	Recap
11	November 20	at San Francisco 49ers	L 7–23	3–7	Candlestick Park	Recap
12	November 27	at St. Louis Rams	W 23–20	4–7	Edward Jones Dome	Recap
13	December 4	Dallas Cowboys	W 19–13 (OT)	5–7	University of Phoenix Stadium	Recap
14	December 11	San Francisco 49ers	W 21–19	6–7	University of Phoenix Stadium	Recap
15	December 18	Cleveland Browns	W 20–17 (OT)	7–7	University of Phoenix Stadium	Recap
16	December 24	at Cincinnati Bengals	L 16–23	7–8	Paul Brown Stadium	Recap
17	January 1	Seattle Seahawks	W 23–20 (OT)	8–8	University of Phoenix Stadium	Recap

=== Game summaries ===
==== Week 1: vs. Carolina Panthers ====
Week 1: Carolina Panthers at Arizona Cardinals – Game summary

Quarter	1	2	3	4	Total
Panthers	7	7	7	0	21
Cardinals	7	0	7	14	28

at University of Phoenix Stadium, Glendale, Arizona

- Date: September 11
- Game time: 1:15 p.m. MST
- Game weather: None (retractable roof closed)
- Game attendance: 60,627
- Referee: Carl Cheffers
- TV announcers (Fox): Sam Rosen, Chad Pennington and Jody Jackson
- Box Score

Game information

First quarter

- ARI – Beanie Wells 7-yard run (Jay Feely kick), 8:45. Cardinals 7–0. Drive: 6 plays, 54 yards, 3:42.
- CAR – Steve Smith 77-yard pass from Cam Newton (Olindo Mare kick), 7:11. Tied 7–7. Drive: 3 plays, 80 yards, 1:34.

Second quarter

- CAR – Steve Smith 26-yard pass from Cam Newton (Olindo Mare kick), 0:06. Panthers 14–7. Drive: 4 plays, 74 yards, 0:57.

Third quarter

- ARI – Jeff King 48-yard pass from Kevin Kolb (Jay Feely kick), 10:40. Tied 14–14. Drive: 1 play, 48 yards, 0:12.
- CAR – Cam Newton 1-yard run (Olindo Mare kick), 5:49. Panthers 21–14. Drive: 8 plays, 80 yards, 4:51.

Fourth quarter

- ARI – Early Doucet 70-yard pass from Kevin Kolb (Jay Feely kick), 10:48. Tied 21–21. Drive: 5 plays, 90 yards, 2:13.
- ARI – Patrick Peterson 89-yard punt return (Jay Feely kick), 7:15. Cardinals 28–21.

Top passers

- CAR – Cam Newton – 24/37, 422 yards, 2 TD, INT
- ARI – Kevin Kolb – 18/27, 309 yards, 2 TD

Top rushers

- CAR – DeAngelo Williams – 12 rushes, 30 yards
- ARI – Beanie Wells – 18 rushes, 90 yards, TD

Top receivers

- CAR – Steve Smith – 8 receptions, 178 yards, 2 TD
- ARI – Early Doucet – 3 receptions, 105 yards, TD

==== Week 2: at Washington Redskins ====
Week 2: Arizona Cardinals at Washington Redskins – Game summary

Quarter	1	2	3	4	Total
Cardinals	7	0	7	7	21
Redksins	0	10	0	12	22

at FedExField, Landover, Maryland

- Date: September 18
- Game time: 1:00 p.m. EDT/10:00 a.m. MST
- Game weather: Cloudy, 66 °F (19 °C)
- Game attendance: 76,330
- Referee: Peter Morelli
- TV announcers (Fox): Chris Myers and Tim Ryan
- Box Score

Game information

First quarter

- ARI – Jeff King 21-yard pass from Kevin Kolb (Jay Feely kick), 3:54. Cardinals 7–0. Drive: 2 plays, 37 yards, 0:38.

Second quarter

- WAS – Graham Gano 26-yard field goal, 10:25. Cardinals 7–3. Drive: 14 plays, 77 yards, 8:29.
- WAS – Fred Davis 1-yard pass from Rex Grossman (Graham Gano kick), 3:04. Redskins 10–7. Drive: 6 plays, 80 yards, 2:57.

Third quarter

- ARI – Beanie Wells 2-yard run (Jay Feely kick), 2:47. Cardinals 14–10. Drive: 9 plays, 90 yards, 4:31.

Fourth quarter

- WAS – Graham Gano 23-yard field goal, 11:18. Cardinals 14–13. Drive: 7 plays, 39 yards, 3:42.
- ARI – Larry Fitzgerald 73-yard pass from Kevin Kolb (Jay Feely kick), 10:58. Cardinals 21–13. Drive: 1 play, 68 yards, 0:20.
- WAS – Santana Moss 18-yard pass from Rex Grossman (run failed), 5:17. Cardinals 21–19. Drive: 13 plays, 73 yards, 5:41.
- WAS – Graham Gano 34-yard field goal, 1:45. Cardinals 22–21. Drive: 8 plays, 48 yards, 2:35.

Top passers

- ARI – Kevin Kolb – 17/30, 251 yards, 2 TD, INT
- WAS – Rex Grossman – 25/43, 291 yards, 2 TD, 2 INT

Top rushers

- ARI – Beanie Wells – 14 rushes, 93 yards, TD
- WAS – Tim Hightower – 20 rushes, 96 yards

Top receivers

- ARI – Larry Fitzgerald – 7 receptions, 133 yards, TD
- WAS – Fred Davis – 6 receptions, 86 yards, TD

==== Week 3: at Seattle Seahawks ====
Week 3: Arizona Cardinals at Seattle Seahawks – Game summary

Quarter	1	2	3	4	Total
Cardinals	0	10	0	0	10
Seahawks	3	3	7	0	13

at CenturyLink Field, Seattle, Washington

- Date: September 25
- Game time: 1:15 p.m. MST & PDT
- Game weather: Rain, 68 °F (20 °C)
- Game attendance: 66,199
- Referee: Alberto Riveron
- TV announcers (Fox): Chris Myers, Tim Ryan and Drea Avent
- Box Score

Game information

First quarter

- SEA – Stephen Hauschka 30-yard field goal, 2:55. Seahawks 3–0. Drive: 7 plays, 47 yards, 3:57.

Second quarter

- ARI – Jay Feely 44-yard field goal, 12:48. Tied 3–3. Drive: 10 plays, 26 yards, 5:07.
- ARI – Larry Fitzgerald 12-yard pass from Kevin Kolb (Jay Feely kick), 7:29. Cardinals 10–3. Drive: 8 plays, 78 yards, 3:06.
- SEA – Stephen Hauschka 52-yard field goal, 0:43. Cardinals 10–6. Drive: 8 plays, 16 yards, 1:08.

Third quarter

- SEA – Tarvaris Jackson 11-yard run (Stephen Hauschka kick), 5:57. Seahawks 13–10. Drive: 14 plays, 72 yards, 6:00.

Fourth quarter

- No scoring plays

Top passers

- ARI – Kevin Kolb – 25/39, 252 yards, TD, 2 INT
- SEA – Tarvaris Jackson – 18/31, 171 yards, INT

Top rushers

- ARI – Alfonso Smith – 17 rushes, 54 yards
- SEA – Marshawn Lynch – 19 rushes, 73 yards

Top receivers

- ARI – Larry Fitzgerald – 5 receptions, 64 yards, TD
- SEA – Sidney Rice – 8 receptions, 109 yards

==== Week 4: vs. New York Giants ====
Week 4: New York Giants at Arizona Cardinals – Game summary

Quarter	1	2	3	4	Total
Giants	0	10	0	21	31
Cardinals	3	3	14	7	27

at University of Phoenix Stadium, Glendale, Arizona

- Date: October 2
- Game time: 1:05 p.m. MST
- Game weather: None (retractable roof closed)
- Game attendance: 60,496
- Referee: Jerome Boger
- TV announcers (Fox): Kenny Albert, Daryl Johnston and Tony Siragusa
- Box Score

Game information

First quarter

- ARI – Jay Feely 27-yard field goal, 13:02. Cardinals 3–0. Drive: 4 plays, 7 yards, 1:35.

Second quarter

- ARI – Jay Feely 27-yard field goal, 7:57. Cardinals 6–0. Drive: 16 plays, 79 yards, 9:20.
- NYG – Ahmad Bradshaw 13-yard run (Lawrence Tynes kick), 2:54. Giants 7–6. Drive: 10 plays, 69 yards, 5:03.
- NYG – Lawrence Tynes 30-yard field goal, 0:01. Giants 10–6. Drive: 5 plays, 61 yards, 0:28.

Third quarter

- ARI – Beanie Wells 1-yard run (Jay Feely kick), 10:24. Cardinals 13–10. Drive: 8 plays, 78 yards, 4:36.
- ARI – Beanie Wells 1-yard run (Jay Feely kick), 2:55. Cardinals 20–10. Drive: 2 plays, 5 yards, 0:40.

Fourth quarter

- NYG – Brandon Jacobs 1-yard run (Lawrence Tynes kick), 12:07. Cardinals 20–17. Drive: 13 plays, 75 yards, 5:48.
- ARI – Beanie Wells 2-yard run (Jay Feely kick), 5:16. Cardinals 27–17. Drive: 6 plays, 77 yards, 3:09.
- NYG – Jake Ballard 2-yard pass from Eli Manning (Lawrence Tynes kick), 3:37. Cardinals 27–24. Drive: 7 plays, 80 yards, 1:39.
- NYG – Hakeem Nicks 29-yard pass from Eli Manning (Lawrence Tynes kick), 2:39. Giants 31–27. Drive: 2 plays, 48 yards, 0:31.

Top passers

- NYG – Eli Manning – 27/40, 321 yards, 2 TD
- ARI – Kevin Kolb – 20/34, 237 yards, INT

Top rushers

- NYG – Ahmad Bradshaw – 12 rushes, 39 yards, TD
- ARI – Beanie Wells – 27 rushes, 138 yards, 3 TD

Top receivers

- NYG – Hakeem Nicks – 10 receptions, 162 yards, TD
- ARI – Larry Fitzgerald – 8 receptions, 102 yards

Despite the Cardinals holding a 10-point lead twice in the fourth quarter, the Giants scored three touchdowns in the final frame as Arizona dropped its third straight game and fell to 1–3.

==== Week 5: at Minnesota Vikings ====
Week 5: Arizona Cardinals at Minnesota Vikings – Game summary

Quarter	1	2	3	4	Total
Cardinals	0	3	7	0	10
Vikings	28	0	3	3	34

at Mall of America Field at Hubert H. Humphrey Metrodome, Minneapolis, Minnesota

- Date: October 9
- Game time: 12:05 p.m. CDT/10:05 a.m. MST
- Game weather: None (indoor stadium)
- Game attendance: 62,479
- Referee: Scott Green
- TV announcers (Fox): Chris Myers and Tim Ryan
- Box Score

Game information

First quarter

- MIN – Adrian Peterson 4-yard run (Ryan Longwell kick), 9:18. Vikings 7–0. Drive: 4 plays, 18 yards, 1:35.
- MIN – Adrian Peterson 24-yard run (Ryan Longwell kick), 8:55. Vikings 14–0. Drive: 1 play, 24 yards, 0:07.
- MIN – Donovan McNabb 4-yard run (Ryan Longwell kick), 6:25. Vikings 21–0. Drive: 5 plays, 25 yards, 1:50.
- MIN – Adrian Peterson 14-yard run (Ryan Longwell kick), 2:41. Vikings 28–0. Drive: 4 plays, 73 yards, 2:01.

Second quarter

- ARI – Jay Feely 51-yard field goal, 10:29. Vikings 28–3. Drive: 7 plays, 20 yards, 3:25.

Third quarter

- ARI – Beanie Wells 2-yard run (Jay Feely kick), 8:23. Vikings 28–10. Drive: 9 plays, 59 yards, 3:41.
- MIN – Ryan Longwell 26-yard field goal, 3:35. Vikings 31–10. Drive: 8 plays, 82 yards, 4:48.

Fourth quarter

- MIN – Ryan Longwell 53-yard field goal, 2:09. Vikings 34–10. Drive: 7 plays, 12 yards, 4:33.

Top passers

- ARI – Kevin Kolb – 21/42, 232 yards, 2 INT
- MIN – Donovan McNabb – 10/21, 169 yards

Top rushers

- ARI – Beanie Wells – 20 rushes, 60 yards, TD
- MIN – Adrian Peterson – 29 rushes, 122 yards, 3 TD

Top receivers

- ARI – Early Doucet – 8 receptions, 92 yards
- MIN – Devin Aromashodu – 2 receptions, 81 yards

==== Week 7: vs. Pittsburgh Steelers ====
Week 7: Pittsburgh Steelers at Arizona Cardinals – Game summary

Quarter	1	2	3	4	Total
Steelers	7	10	9	6	32
Cardinals	0	7	7	6	20

at University of Phoenix Stadium, Glendale, Arizona

- Date: October 23
- Game time: 1:05 p.m. MST
- Game weather: None (retractable roof closed)
- Game attendance: 62,475
- Referee: John Parry
- TV announcers (CBS): Greg Gumbel and Dan Dierdorf
- Box Score

Game information

First quarter

- PIT – Heath Miller 12-yard pass from Ben Roethlisberger (Shaun Suisham kick), 9:39. Steelers 7–0. Drive: 5 plays, 31 yards, 3:07.

Second quarter

- PIT – Mike Wallace 95-yard pass from Ben Roethlisberger (Shaun Suisham kick), 8:09. Steelers 14–0. Drive: 1 play, 91 yards, 0:12.
- ARI – Alfonso Smith 1-yard run (Jay Feely kick), 1:20. Steelers 14–7. Drive: 13 plays, 80 yards, 6:49.
- PIT – Shaun Suisham 41-yard field goal, 0:00. Steelers 17–7. Drive: 8 plays, 52 yards, 1:20.

Third quarter

- ARI – LaRod Stephens-Howling 73-yard pass from Kevin Kolb (Jay Feely kick), 9:26. Steelers 17–14. Drive: 6 plays, 89 yards, 2:40.
- PIT – Emmanuel Sanders 4-yard pass from Ben Roethlisberger (Shaun Suisham kick), 3:54. Steelers 24–14. Drive: 11 plays, 80 yards, 5:32.
- PIT – Team safety, 3:42. Steelers 26–14.

Fourth quarter

- PIT – Shaun Suisham 42-yard field goal, 11:30. Steelers 29–14. Drive: 13 plays, 51 yards, 7:12.
- PIT – Shaun Suisham 39-yard field goal, 6:46. Steelers 32–14. Drive: 7 plays, 19 yards, 4:10.
- ARI – Early Doucet 2-yard pass from Kevin Kolb (pass failed), 3:53. Steelers 32–20. Drive: 11 plays, 71 yards, 2:53.

Top passers

- PIT – Ben Roethlisberger – 26/39, 361 yards, 3 TD
- ARI – Kevin Kolb – 18/34, 272 yards, 2 TD, INT

Top rushers

- PIT – Rashard Mendenhall – 13 rushes, 32 yards
- ARI – Beanie Wells – 12 rushes, 42 yards

Top receivers

- PIT – Mike Wallace – 3 receptions, 118 yards, TD
- ARI – Larry Fitzgerald – 4 receptions, 78 yards

Coming off their bye week, the Cardinals went home for a Week 7 interconference duel with the Pittsburgh Steelers, in a rematch of Super Bowl XLIII. Arizona trailed early in the first quarter as Steelers quarterback Ben Roethlisberger completed a 12-yard touchdown pass to tight end Heath Miller. Pittsburgh would add onto their lead in the second quarter as Roethlisberger completed a 95-yard touchdown pass to wide receiver Mike Wallace. The Cardinals would answer with a 1-yard touchdown run from running back Alfonso Smith. The Steelers would close out the half with kicker Shaun Suisham getting a 41-yard field goal.

Arizona opened the third quarter with quarterback Kevin Kolb finding running back LaRod Stephens-Howling on a 73-yard touchdown pass, but Pittsburgh struck back with Roethlisberger completing a 4-yard touchdown pass to wide receiver Emmanuel Sanders, along with Kolb's intentional grounding penalty in the endzone resulting in a safety. In the fourth quarter, the Steelers continued to pull away with Suisham making a 42-yard and a 39-yard field goal. The Cardinals tried to rally as Kolb found wide receiver Early Doucet on a 2-yard touchdown pass (with a failed two-point conversion), but Pittsburgh held on to preserve the victory.

With the loss, Arizona fell to 1–5.

==== Week 8: at Baltimore Ravens ====
Week 8: Arizona Cardinals at Baltimore Ravens – Game summary

Quarter	1	2	3	4	Total
Cardinals	3	21	0	3	27
Ravens	0	6	14	10	30

at M&T Bank Stadium, Baltimore, Maryland

- Date: October 30
- Game time: 1:00 p.m. EDT/10:00 a.m. MST
- Game weather: Sunny, 48 °F (9 °C)
- Game attendance: 71,022
- Referee: Jeff Triplette
- TV announcers (Fox): Sam Rosen, Brian Billick and Laura Okmin
- Box Score

Game information

First quarter

- ARI – Jay Feely 32-yard field goal, 3:56. Cardinals 3–0. Drive: 7 plays, 73 yards, 3:19.

Second quarter

- BAL – Billy Cundiff 26-yard field goal, 12:26. Tied 3–3. Drive: 15 plays, 77 yards, 6:30.
- ARI – Beanie Wells 1-yard run (Jay Feely kick), 8:22. Cardinals `10–3. Drive: 2 plays, 2 yards, 0:36.
- ARI – Patrick Peterson 82-yard punt return (Jay Feely kick), 6:06. Cardinals 17–3.
- ARI – Early Doucet 10-yard pass from Kevin Kolb (Jay Feely kick), 3:46. Cardinals 24–3. Drive: 4 plays, 25 yards, 2:11.
- BAL – Billy Cundiff 47-yard field goal, 0:34. Cardinals 24–6. Drive: 13 plays, 51 yards, 3:12.

Third quarter

- BAL – Ray Rice 1-yard run (Billy Cundiff kick), 12:13. Cardinals 24–13. Drive: 7 plays, 80 yards, 2:47.
- BAL – Ray Rice 1-yard run (Billy Cundiff kick), 1:32. Cardinals 24–20. Drive: 10 plays, 88 yards, 3:12.

Fourth quarter

- BAL – Ray Rice 3-yard run (Billy Cundiff kick), 14:55. Ravens 27–24. Drive: 3 plays, 22 yards, 1:22.
- ARI – Jay Feely 45-yard field goal, 8:55. Tied 27–27. Drive: 12 plays, 53 yards, 6:00.
- BAL – Billy Cundiff 25-yard field goal, 0:00. Ravens 30–27. Drive: 5 plays, 37 yards, 0:52.

Top passers

- ARI – Kevin Kolb – 10/21, 153 yards, TD, INT
- BAL – Joe Flacco – 31/51, 336 yards, INT

Top rushers

- ARI – Beanie Wells – 22 rushes, 83 yards, TD
- BAL – Ray Rice – 18 rushes, 63 yards, 3 TD

Top receivers

- ARI – Larry Fitzgerald – 3 receptions, 98 yards
- BAL – Anquan Boldin – 7 receptions, 145 yards

The Cardinals blew a 21-point first half lead and lost their sixth straight game to fall to 1–6.

==== Week 9: vs. St. Louis Rams ====
Week 9: St. Louis Rams at Arizona Cardinals – Game summary

Quarter	1	2	3	4	OT	Total
Rams	3	6	4	0	0	13
Cardinals	3	0	3	7	6	19

at University of Phoenix Stadium, Glendale, Arizona

- Date: November 6
- Game time: 2:15 p.m. MST
- Game weather: None (retractable roof closed)
- Game attendance: 60,628
- Referee: Ron Winter
- TV announcers (Fox): Sam Rosen, Chad Pennington and Nischelle Turner
- Box Score

Game information

First quarter

- ARI – Jay Feely 27-yard field goal, 10:51. Cardinals 3–0. Drive: 7 plays, 28 yards, 2:39.
- STL – Josh Brown 48-yard field goal, 4:38. Tied 3–3. Drive: 10 plays, 55 yards, 6:13.

Second quarter

- STL – Josh Brown 37-yard field goal, 7:02. Rams 6–3. Drive: 11 plays, 50 yards, 6:11.
- STL – Josh Brown 41-yard field goal, 0:00. Rams 9–3. Drive: 10 plays, 57 yards, 3:26.

Third quarter

- ARI – Jay Feely 38-yard field goal, 10:30. Rams 9–6. Drive: 9 plays, 58 yards, 4:30.
- STL – Team safety, 7:24. Rams 11–6.
- STL – Team safety, 3:31. Rams 13–6.

Fourth quarter

- ARI – Larry Fitzgerald 13-yard pass from John Skelton (Jay Feely kick), 4:51. Tied 13–13. Drive: 9 plays, 84 yards, 3:43.

Overtime

- ARI – Patrick Peterson 99-yard punt return, 13:03. Cardinals 19–13.

Top passers

- STL – Sam Bradford – 23/36, 255 yards, INT
- ARI – John Skelton – 20/35, 222 yards, TD

Top rushers

- STL – Steven Jackson – 29 rushes, 130 yards
- ARI – John Skelton – 4 rushes, 38 yards

Top receivers

- STL – Brandon Lloyd – 5 receptions, 80 yards
- ARI – Early Doucet – 6 receptions, 78 yards

The Cardinals snapped their six-game losing streak as rookie Patrick Peterson returned a punt 98 yards for a game-winning touchdown in overtime. With the win, the Cardinals improved to 2–6. The game also featured the Rams' scoring the four points in the third quarter as the got two safeties on consecutive drives. This was first time in NFL history that a team had recorded four points in a quarter.

==== Week 10: at Philadelphia Eagles ====
Week 10: Arizona Cardinals at Philadelphia Eagles – Game summary

Quarter	1	2	3	4	Total
Cardinals	0	7	0	14	21
Eagles	0	14	0	3	17

at Lincoln Financial Field, Philadelphia, Pennsylvania

- Date: November 21
- Game time: 1:00 p.m. EST/11:00 a.m. MST
- Game weather: Partly Cloudy, 60 °F (16 °C)
- Game attendance: 69,144
- Referee: Walt Anderson
- TV announcers (Fox): Dick Stockton, John Lynch and Jennifer Hale
- Box Score

Game information

First quarter

- No scoring plays

Second quarter

- PHI – Asante Samuel 20-yard interception return (Alex Henery kick, 9:35. Eagles 7–0.
- ARI – Larry Fitzgerald 10-yard pass from John Skelton (Jay Feely kick), 4:48. Tied 7–7. Drive: 10 plays, 84 yards, 4:47.
- PHI – LeSean McCoy 1-yard run (Alex Henery kick), 0:17. Eagles 14–7. Drive: 10 plays, 70 yards, 4:31.

Third quarter

- No scoring plays

Fourth quarter

- ARI – Larry Fitzgerald 7-yard pass from John Skelton (Jay Feely kick), 9:18. Tied 14–14. Drive: 8 plays, 89 yards, 4:00.
- PHI – Alex Henery 36-yard field goal, 5:06. Eagles 17–14. Drive: 4 plays, 8 yards, 1:53.
- ARI – Early Doucet 5-yard pass from John Skelton (Jay Feely kick), 1:53. Cardinals 21–17. Drive: 11 plays, 87 yards, 3:13.

Top passers

- ARI – John Skelton – 21/40, 315 yards, 3 TD, 2 INT
- PHI – Michael Vick – 16/34, 128 yards, 2 INT

Top rushers

- ARI – Beanie Wells – 23 rushes, 62 yards
- PHI – LeSean McCoy – 14 rushes, 81 yards, TD

Top receivers

- ARI – Larry Fitzgerald – 7 receptions, 146 yards, 2 TD
- PHI – Brent Celek – 4 receptions, 53 yards

==== Week 11: at San Francisco 49ers ====
Week 11: Arizona Cardinals at San Francisco 49ers – Game summary

Quarter	1	2	3	4	Total
Cardinals	0	0	0	7	7
49ers	6	3	14	0	23

at Candlestick Park, San Francisco, California

- Date: November 20
- Game time: 1:05 p.m. PST/2:050 p.m. MST
- Game weather: Rain, 55 °F (13 °C)
- Game attendance: 69,732
- Referee: Peter Morelli
- TV announcers (Fox): Thom Brennaman, Brian Billick and Laura Okmin
- Box Score

Game information

First quarter

- SF – David Akers 22-yard field goal, 3:10. 49ers 3–0. Drive: 9 plays, 59 yards, 3:48.
- SF – David Akers 43-yard field goal, 2:06. 49ers 6–0. Drive: 4 plays, 1 yard, 0:59.

Second quarter

- SF – David Akers 29-yard field goal, 0:56. 49ers 9–0. Drive: 13 plays, 75 yards, 6:06.

Third quarter

- SF – Kyle Williams 8-yard pass from Alex Smith (David Akers kick), 7:12. 49ers 16–0. Drive: 13 plays, 84 yards, 7:48.
- SF – Vernon Davis 18-yard pass from Alex Smith (David Akers kick), 4:14. 49ers 23–0. Drive: 4 plays, 37 yards, 1:53.

Fourth quarter

- ARI – Larry Fitzgerald 23-yard pass from Richard Bartel (Jay Feely kick), 8:38. 49ers 23–7. Drive: 6 plays, 84 yards, 2:36.

Top passers

- ARI – John Skelton – 6/19, 99 yards, 3 INT
- SF – Alex Smith – 20/38, 267 yards, 2 TD, INT

Top rushers

- ARI – Chester Taylor – 1 rush, 34 yards
- SF – Frank Gore – 24 rushes, 88 yards

Top receivers

- ARI – Andre Roberts – 3 receptions, 51 yards
- SF – Michael Crabtree – 7 receptions, 120 yards

==== Week 12: at St. Louis Rams ====
Week 12: Arizona Cardinals at St. Louis Rams – Game summary

Quarter	1	2	3	4	Total
Cardinals	3	0	17	3	23
Rams	7	3	0	10	20

at Edward Jones Dome, St. Louis, Missouri

- Date: November 27
- Game time: 12:00 p.m. CST/11:00 p.m. MST
- Game weather: None (indoor stadium)
- Game attendance: 56,029
- Referee: Mike Carey
- TV announcers (Fox): Sam Rosen, Chad Pennington and Tina Cervasio
- Box Score

Game information

First quarter

- STL – Nick Miller 88-yard punt return (Josh Brown kick), 9:15. Rams 7–0.
- ARI – Jay Feely 29-yard field goal, 0:36. Rams 7–3. Drive: 6 plays, 70 yards, 2:19.

Second quarter

- STL – Josh Brown 35-yard field goal, 0:03. Rams 10–3. Drive: 11 plays, 63 yards, 3:49.

Third quarter

- ARI – Jay Feely 37-yard field goal, 9:38. Rams 10–6. Drive: 8 plays, 61 yards, 5:22.
- ARI – Beanie Wells 7-yard run (Jay Feely kick), 5:54. Cardinals 13–10. Drive: 6 plays, 28 yards, 2:49.
- ARI – Patrick Peterson 80-yard punt return (Jay Feely kick), 2:56. Cardinals 20–10.

Fourth quarter

- STL – Josh Brown 48-yard field goal, 14:49. Rams 20–13. Drive: 8 plays, 49 yards, 3:07.
- STL – Brandon Lloyd 16-yard pass from Sam Bradford (Josh Brown kick), 7:46. Tied 20–20. Drive: 3 plays, 43 yards, 1:25.
- ARI – Jay Feely 22-yard field goal, 4:09. Cardinals 23–20. Drive: 8 plays, 71 yards, 3:37.

Top passers

- ARI – John Skelton – 12/23, 114 yards, 2 INT
- STL – Sam Bradford – 17/31, 203 yards, TD

Top rushers

- ARI – Beanie Wells – 27 rushes, 228 yards, TD
- STL – Steven Jackson – 17 rushes, 64 yards

Top receivers

- ARI – Larry Fitzgerald – 3 receptions, 55 yards
- STL – Brandon Lloyd – 5 receptions, 74 yards, TD

==== Week 13: vs. Dallas Cowboys ====
Week 13: Dallas Cowboys at Arizona Cardinals – Game summary

Quarter	1	2	3	4	OT	Total
Cowboys	0	10	3	0	0	13
Cardinals	3	0	3	7	6	19

at University of Phoenix Stadium, Glendale, Arizona

- Date: December 4
- Game time: 2:15 p.m. MST
- Game weather: None (retractable roof closed)
- Game attendance: 62,180
- Referee: Walt Coleman
- TV announcers (Fox): Dick Stockton, John Lynch and Jennifer Hale
- Box Score

Game information

First quarter

- ARI – Jay Feely 48-yard field goal, 4:13. Cardinals 3–0. Drive: 6 plays, 27 yards, 3:03.

Second quarter

- DAL – Dan Bailey 50-yard field goal, 5:50. Tied 3–3. Drive: 8 plays, 30 yards, 3:51.
- DAL – Dez Bryant 5-yard pass from Tony Romo (Dan Bailey kick), 3:09. Cowboys 10–3. Drive: 3 plays, 33 yards, 0:57.

Third quarter

- ARI – Jay Feely 23-yard field goal, 8:18. Cowboys 10–6. Drive: 12 plays, 74 yards, 6:42.
- DAL – Dan Bailey 37-yard field goal, 0:34. Cowboys 13–6. Drive: 13 plays, 65 yards, 7:44.

Fourth quarter

- ARI – Beanie Wells 4-yard run (Jay Feely kick), 13:08. Tied 13–13. Drive: 6 plays, 79 yards, 2:26.

Overtime

- ARI – LaRod Stephens-Howling 52-yard pass from Kevin Kolb, 11:43. Cardinals 19–13. Drive: 5 plays, 80 yards, 3:17.

Top passers

- DAL – Tony Romo – 28/42, 299 yards, TD
- ARI – Kevin Kolb – 16/27, 247 yards, TD

Top rushers

- DAL – DeMarco Murray – 12 rushes, 38 yards
- ARI – Beanie Wells – 20 rushes, 67 yards, TD

Top receivers

- DAL – Dez Bryant – 8 receptions, 86 yards, TD
- ARI – Andre Roberts – 6 receptions, 111 yards

==== Week 14: vs. San Francisco 49ers ====
Week 14: San Francisco 49ers at Arizona Cardinals – Game summary

Quarter	1	2	3	4	Total
49ers	3	9	7	0	19
Cardinals	0	7	7	7	21

at University of Phoenix Stadium, Glendale, Arizona

- Date: December 11
- Game time: 2:05 p.m. MST
- Game weather: None (retractable roof closed)
- Game attendance: 60,808
- Referee: Alberto Riveron
- TV announcers (Fox): Dick Stockton, John Lynch and Jennifer Hale
- Box Score

Game information

First quarter

- SF – David Akers 46-yard field goal, 4:39. 49ers 3–0. Drive: 11 plays, 15 yards, 5:16.

Second quarter

- SF – David Akers 22-yard field goal, 14:02. 49ers 6–0. Drive: 4 plays, -1 yard, 0:58.
- ARI – Early Doucet 60-yard pass from John Skelton (Jay Feely kick), 7:10. Cardinals 7–6. Drive: 1 play, 60 yards, 0:11.
- SF – David Akers 27-yard field goal, 1:58. 49ers 9–7. Drive: 10 plays, 69 yards, 5:12.
- SF – David Akers 22-yard field goal, 0:00. 49ers 12–7. Drive: 6 plays, 12 yards, 1:10.

Third quarter

- SF – Frank Gore 37-yard run (David Akers kick), 12:24. 49ers 19–7. Drive: 1 play, 37 yards, 0:09.
- ARI – Larry Fitzgerald 46-yard pass from John Skelton (Jay Feely kick), 9:04. 49ers 19–14. Drive: 6 plays, 80 yards, 3:20.

Fourth quarter

- ARI – Andre Roberts 3-yard pass from John Skelton (Jay Feely kick), 11:50. Cardinals 21–19. Drive: 6 plays, 78 yards, 3:26.

Top passers

- SF – Alex Smith – 18/37, 175 yards
- ARI – John Skelton – 19/28, 282 yards, 3 TD, 2 INT

Top rushers

- SF – Frank Gore – 10 rushes, 72 yards, TD
- ARI – Beanie Wells – 15 rushes, 27 yards

Top receivers

- SF – Michael Crabtree – 7 receptions, 63 yards
- ARI – Larry Fitzgerald – 7 receptions, 149 yards, TD

The Cardinals came back from 12-point halftime deficit to stun the 10–2 49ers. With the win, the Cardinals improved to 6–7.

==== Week 15: vs. Cleveland Browns ====
Week 15: Cleveland Browns at Arizona Cardinals – Game summary

Quarter	1	2	3	4	OT	Total
Browns	7	3	7	0	0	17
Cardinals	0	7	0	10	3	20

at University of Phoenix Stadium, Glendale, Arizona

- Date: December 18
- Game time: 2:15 p.m. MST
- Game weather: None (retractable roof closed)
- Game attendance: 60,443
- Referee: Scott Green
- TV announcers (CBS): Bill Macatee and Steve Tasker
- Box Score

Game information

First quarter

- CLE – Peyton Hillis 1-yard run (Phil Dawson kick), 11:33. Browns 7–0. Drive: 7 plays, 76 yards, 3:27.

Second quarter

- CLE – Phil Dawson 44-yard field goal, 11:33. Browns 10–0. Drive: 15 plays, 54 yards, 7:19.
- ARI – Andre Roberts 9-yard pass from John Skelton (Jay Feely kick), 0:19. Browns 10–7. Drive: 9 plays, 65 yards, 1:30.

Third quarter

- CLE – Greg Little 76-yard pass from Seneca Wallace (Phil Dawson kick), 3:01. Browns 17–7. Drive: 6 plays, 88 yards, 3:21.

Fourth quarter

- ARI – Beanie Wells 1-yard run (Jay Feely kick), 8:33. Browns 17–14. Drive: 11 plays, 87 yards, 4:49.
- ARI – Jay Feely 33-yard field goal, 5:40. Tied 17–17. Drive: 4 plays, -10 yards, 1:20.

Overtime

- ARI – Jay Feely 22-yard field goal, 10:56. Cardinals 20–17. Drive: 4 plays, 36 yards, 1:46.

Top passers

- CLE – Seneca Wallace – 18/31, 226 yards, TD
- ARI – John Skelton – 28/46, 313 yards, TD, INT

Top rushers

- CLE – Peyton Hillis – 26 rushes, 99 yards, TD
- ARI – Beanie Wells – 15 rushes, 51 yards, TD

Top receivers

- CLE – Greg Little – 5 receptions, 131 yards, TD
- ARI – Todd Heap – 7 receptions, 69 yards

Head coach Ken Whisenhunt recorded his 43rd win as the Cardinals' head coach, and surpassed Don Coryell to become the winningest head coach in franchise history. Whisenhunt was the all-time leader in wins for Cardinals head coaches until his record was broken by Bruce Arians 5 years later.

==== Week 16: at Cincinnati Bengals ====
Week 16: Arizona Cardinals at Cincinnati Bengals – Game summary

Quarter	1	2	3	4	Total
Cardinals	0	0	0	16	16
Bengals	10	10	3	0	23

at Paul Brown Stadium, Cincinnati, Ohio

- Date: December 24
- Game time: 1:00 p.m. EST/11:00 a.m. MST
- Game weather: Fair, 38 °F (3 °C)
- Game attendance: 41,273
- Referee: Terry McAulay
- TV announcers (Fox): Thom Brennaman, Brian Billick and Laura Okmin
- Box Score

Game information

First quarter

- CIN – Mike Nugent 24-yard field goal, 10:55. Bengals 3–0. Drive: 5 plays, 17 yards, 1:59.
- CIN – Jermaine Gresham 11-yard pass from Andy Dalton (Mike Nugent kick), 6:24. Bengals 10–0. Drive: 5 plays, 49 yards, 2:35.

Second quarter

- CIN – Jerome Simpson 19-yard pass from Andy Dalton (Mike Nugent kick), 2:46. Bengals 17–0. Drive: 8 plays, 58 yards, 3:50.
- CIN – Mike Nugent 41-yard field goal, 0:00. Bengals 20–0. Drive: 6 plays, 36 yards, 1:47.

Third quarter

- CIN – Mike Nugent 32-yard field goal, 3:09. Bengals 23–0. Drive: 8 plays, 48 yards, 3:51.

Fourth quarter

- ARI – Larry Fitzgerald 30-yard pass from John Skelton (Jay Feely kick), 11:25. Bengals 23–7. Drive: 9 plays, 61 yards, 2:52.
- ARI – Jeff King 2-yard pass from John Skelton (run failed), 7:39. Bengals 23–13. Drive: 4 plays, 39 yards, 1:40.
- ARI – Jay Feely 29-yard field goal, 3:16. Bengals 23–16. Drive: 8 plays, 68 yards, 2:56.

Top passers

- ARI – John Skelton – 23/44, 297 yards, 2 TD, 3 INT
- CIN – Andy Dalton – 18/31, 154 yards, 2 TD

Top rushers

- ARI – Beanie Wells – 14 rushes, 53 yards
- CIN – Cedric Benson – 16 rushes, 57 yards

Top receivers

- ARI – Larry Fitzgerald – 6 receptions, 105 yards, TD
- CIN – Jermaine Gresham – 5 receptions, 56 yards, TD

==== Week 17: vs. Seattle Seahawks ====
Week 17: Seattle Seahawks at Arizona Cardinals – Game summary

Quarter	1	2	3	4	OT	Total
Seahawks	0	3	7	10	0	20
Cardinals	7	3	7	3	3	23

at University of Phoenix Stadium, Glendale, Arizona

- Date: January 1
- Game time: 2:15 p.m. MST
- Game weather: None (retractable roof closed)
- Game attendance: 61,798
- Referee: Gene Steratore
- TV announcers (Fox): Sam Rosen and Chad Pennington
- Box Score

Game information

First quarter

- ARI – Chester Taylor 1-yard run (Jay Feely kick), 3:02. Cardinals 7–0. Drive: 9 plays, 81 yards, 4:37.

Second quarter

- SEA – Stephen Hauschka 43-yard field goal, 12:10. Cardinals 7–3. Drive: 14 plays, 55 yards, 5:52.
- ARI – Jay Feely 41-yard field goal, 3:28. Cardinals 10–3. Drive: 7 plays, 8 yards, 3:14.

Third quarter

- SEA – Leon Washington 48-yard run (Stephen Hauschka kick), 10:56. Tied 10–10. Drive: 3 plays, 74 yards, 1:22.
- ARI – Todd Heap 13-yard pass from John Skelton (Jay Feely kick), 6:18. Cardinals 17–10. Drive: 8 plays, 80 yards, 4:38.

Fourth quarter

- ARI – Jay Feely 43-yard field goal, 12:18. Cardinals 20–10. Drive: 8 plays, 55 yards, 2:54.
- SEA – Stephen Hauschka 26-yard field goal, 9:05. Cardinals 20–13. Drive: 4 plays, 4 yards, 0:59.
- SEA – Ricardo Lockette 61-yard pass from Tarvaris Jackson (Stephen Hauschka kick), 7:47. Tied 20–20. Drive: 1 play, 61 yards, 0:09.

Overtime

- ARI – Jay Feely 28-yard field goal, 5:59. Cardinals 23–20. Drive: 13 plays, 71 yards, 7:56.

Top passers

- SEA – Tarvaris Jackson – 21/35, 222 yards, TD, INT
- ARI – John Skelton – 22/40, 271 yards, TD, INT

Top rushers

- SEA – Marshawn Lynch – 19 rushes, 86 yards
- ARI – LaRod Stephens-Howling – 21 rushes, 93 yards

Top receivers

- SEA – Ricardo Lockette – 1 reception, 61 yards, TD
- ARI – Larry Fitzgerald – 9 receptions, 149 yards

== Standings ==
NFC West
	W	L	T	PCT	DIV	CONF	PF	PA	STK
^{(2)} San Francisco 49ers	13	3	0	.813	5–1	10–2	380	229	W3
Arizona Cardinals	8	8	0	.500	4–2	7–5	312	348	W1
Seattle Seahawks	7	9	0	.438	3–3	6–6	321	315	L2
St. Louis Rams	2	14	0	.125	0–6	1–11	193	407	L7
