= 2010 Arizona Cardinals season =

NFL team season

- Owner: Bill Bidwill
- General manager: Rod Graves
- Head coach: Ken Whisenhunt
- Home stadium: University of Phoenix Stadium

Results
- Record: 5–11
- Division place: 4th NFC West
- Playoffs: Did not qualify
- Pro Bowlers: SS Adrian Wilson; WR Larry Fitzgerald; DT Darnell Dockett

Uniform
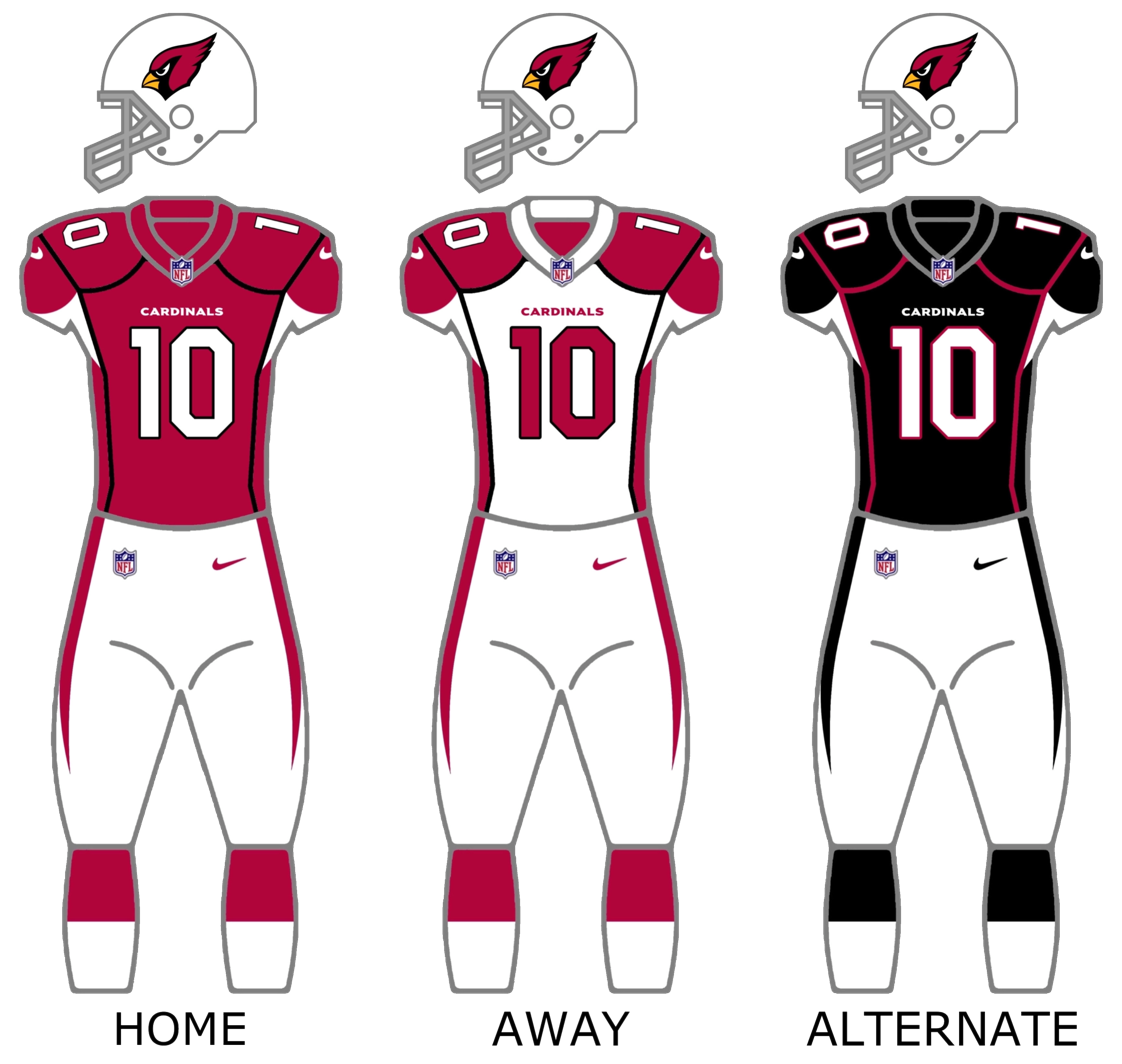

The 2010 season was the Arizona Cardinals' 91st in the National Football League (NFL) and their 23rd in Arizona. The Cardinals attempted to improve on their 10–6 record from 2009 behind starting quarterback Derek Anderson. Anderson was named the starter after Kurt Warner retired in the offseason. But after a modest 3–2 start, the Cardinals fell apart by losing 9 of their remaining 11 contests. Anderson suffered a concussion behind a poorly performing offensive line in Week 14. The team was eliminated from postseason contention for the first time since 2007 in Week 15. Head coach Ken Whisenhunt's offense proved erratic in accuracy and nullified Anderson’s very respectable arm strength. Defensive coordinator Bill Davis was fired after the season.

== Offseason ==
Quarterback Kurt Warner announced his retirement on January 29, 2010.

== 2010 NFL draft ==
After finishing the season with a loss in the divisional round of the postseason, the Cardinals will pick 26th. The Cardinals will also have an additional third and fourth round pick from a trade that sent wide receiver Anquan Boldin to the Baltimore Ravens. Their fourth round pick was traded to the New York Jets for safety Kerry Rhodes.

Arizona Cardinals 2010 NFL Draft selections
Round	Selection	Player	Position	College
1	26	Dan Williams	DT	Tennessee
2	47*	Daryl Washington	LB	Texas Christian
3	88**	Andre Roberts	WR	Citadel
4	130*	O'Brien Schofield	DE	University of Wisconsin
5	155**	John Skelton	QB	Fordham
6	201*	Jorrick Calvin	CB	Troy
7	233	Jim Dray	TE	Stanford

== Staff and roster ==
=== Coaching staff ===
Arizona Cardinals 2010 staff
Front office: Owner/chairman – Bill Bidwill; President – Michael Bidwill; general manager – Rod Graves; Director of football administration – Reggie Terry; Director of player personnel – Steve Keim; Director of pro personnel – T. J. McCreight; Assistant director of pro personnel – Quentin Harris; Head coaches: Head coach – Ken Whisenhunt; Assistant head coach/run game coordinator/offensive line – Russ Grimm; Offensive coaches: Pass game coordinator – Mike Miller; Quarterbacks – Chris Miller; Running backs – Tommie Robinson; Wide receivers – John McNulty; Tight ends – Freddie Kitchens; Offensive quality control – Chad Grimm	Defensive coaches: Defensive coordinator – Billy Davis; Defensive line – Ron Aiken; Linebackers – Matt Raich; Defensive backs – Donnie Henderson; Assistant defensive backs – Rick Courtright; Defensive quality control – Ryan Slowik; Special teams coaches: Special teams – Kevin Spencer; Strength and conditioning: Strength and conditioning – John Lott; Assistant strength and conditioning – Pete Alosi

=== Final roster ===
2010 Arizona Cardinals roster
Quarterbacks (QB): 2 Richard Bartel; 3 Derek Anderson; 19 John Skelton; Running backs (RB): 34 Tim Hightower; 45 Reagan Maui'a FB; 36 LaRod Stephens-Howling KR; 26 Beanie Wells; 31 Jason Wright; Wide receivers (WR): 15 Steve Breaston KR; 11 Larry Fitzgerald; 18 Max Komar PR; 12 Andre Roberts; 14 Stephen Williams; Tight ends (TE): 81 Jim Dray; 89 Ben Patrick; 83 Stephen Spach	Offensive linemen (OL): 74 D'Anthony Batiste T; 73 Jeremy Bridges T/G; 75 Levi Brown T; 62 Ben Claxton C/G; 66 Alan Faneca G; 70 Rex Hadnot G; 76 Deuce Lutui G; 63 Lyle Sendlein C; Defensive linemen (DL): 78 Alan Branch; 93 Calais Campbell DE; 90 Darnell Dockett DE; 97 Bryan Robinson NT; 98 Gabe Watson NT; 92 Dan Williams NT	Linebackers (LB): 57 Curtis Gatewood OLB; 53 Clark Haggans OLB; 54 Gerald Hayes ILB; 51 Paris Lenon ILB; 52 Cyril Obiozor OLB/DE; 55 Joey Porter OLB; 50 O'Brien Schofield OLB/DE; 56 Reggie Walker ILB; 58 Daryl Washington ILB; Defensive backs (DB): 21 Hamza Abdullah SS; 27 Michael Adams CB; 30 Marshay Green CB; 20 A. J. Jefferson CB; 49 Rashad Johnson FS; 23 Trumaine McBride CB; 25 Kerry Rhodes FS; 29 Dominique Rodgers-Cromartie CB; 28 Greg Toler CB; 22 Matt Ware SS; 24 Adrian Wilson SS; Special teams (ST): 4 Jay Feely K; 5 Ben Graham P; 82 Mike Leach LS	Practice squad: 65 Cliff Louis T; 69 Jeremy Navarre DE; 68 Tom Pestock G; 48 Brandon Sharpe LB; 46 Alfonso Smith RB; 96 Ronald Talley DE; 95 Pago Togafau LB; 10 Isaiah Williams WR; Reserve: 32 Nehemiah Broughton FB (IR); 59 Will Davis OLB/DE (IR); 80 Early Doucet WR (IR); 94 Keilen Dykes DE (IR); 6 Max Hall QB (IR); 91 Kenny Iwebema DE (IR); 72 Brandon Keith T (IR); Rookies in italics 53 active, 7 reserve, 8 practice squad

== Preseason ==
=== Schedule ===
Week	Date	Opponent	Result	Record	Venue	Recap
1	August 14	Houston Texans	W 19–16	1–0	University of Phoenix Stadium	Recap
2	August 23	at Tennessee Titans	L 10–24	1–1	LP Field	Recap
3	August 28	at Chicago Bears	W 14–9	2–1	Soldier Field	Recap
4	September 2	Washington Redskins	W 20–10	3–1	University of Phoenix Stadium	Recap

== Regular season ==
Week	Date	Opponent	Result	Record	Venue	Recap
1	September 12	at St. Louis Rams	W 17–13	1–0	Edward Jones Dome	Recap
2	September 19	at Atlanta Falcons	L 7–41	1–1	Georgia Dome	Recap
3	September 26	Oakland Raiders	W 24–23	2–1	University of Phoenix Stadium	Recap
4	October 3	at San Diego Chargers	L 10–41	2–2	Qualcomm Stadium	Recap
5	October 10	New Orleans Saints	W 30–20	3–2	University of Phoenix Stadium	Recap
6	Bye					
7	October 24	at Seattle Seahawks	L 10–22	3–3	Qwest Field	Recap
8	October 31	Tampa Bay Buccaneers	L 35–38	3–4	University of Phoenix Stadium	Recap
9	November 7	at Minnesota Vikings	L 24–27 (OT)	3–5	Mall of America Field	Recap
10	November 14	Seattle Seahawks	L 18–36	3–6	University of Phoenix Stadium	Recap
11	November 21	at Kansas City Chiefs	L 13–31	3–7	Arrowhead Stadium	Recap
12	November 29	San Francisco 49ers	L 6–27	3–8	University of Phoenix Stadium	Recap
13	December 5	St. Louis Rams	L 6–19	3–9	University of Phoenix Stadium	Recap
14	December 12	Denver Broncos	W 43–13	4–9	University of Phoenix Stadium	Recap
15	December 19	at Carolina Panthers	L 12–19	4–10	Bank of America Stadium	Recap
16	December 25	Dallas Cowboys	W 27–26	5–10	University of Phoenix Stadium	Recap
17	January 2	at San Francisco 49ers	L 7–38	5–11	Candlestick Park	Recap

== Standings ==
NFC West
	W	L	T	PCT	DIV	CONF	PF	PA	STK
^{(4)} Seattle Seahawks	7	9	0	.438	4–2	6–6	310	407	W1
St. Louis Rams	7	9	0	.438	3–3	5–7	289	328	L1
San Francisco 49ers	6	10	0	.375	4–2	4–8	305	346	W1
Arizona Cardinals	5	11	0	.313	1–5	3–9	289	434	L1

== Regular season results ==
=== Week 1: at St. Louis Rams ===
Week 1: Arizona Cardinals at St. Louis Rams – Game summary

Quarter	1	2	3	4	Total
Cardinals	0	10	0	7	17
Rams	0	10	3	0	13

at Edward Jones Dome, St. Louis, Missouri

- Date: September 12
- Game time: 3:15 p.m. CDT/1:15 p.m. MST
- Game weather: None (indoor stadium)
- Game attendance: 52,440
- Referee: Alberto Riveron
- TV announcers (Fox): Ron Pitts, John Lynch and Nischelle Turner
- Box Score

Game information

First quarter

- No scoring plays

Second quarter

- ARI – Jay Feely 22-yard field goal, 13:54. Cardinals 3–0. Drive: 10 plays, 56 yards, 4:01.
- STL – Josh Brown 46-yard field goal, 5:28. Tied 3–3. Drive: 8 plays, 44 yards, 4:36.
- ARI – Tim Hightower 1-yard run (Jay Feely kick), 2:54. Cardinals 10–3. Drive: 5 plays, 76 yards, 2:34.
- STL – Laurent Robinson 1-yard pass from Sam Bradford (Josh Brown kick), 0:00. Tied 10–10. Drive: 8 plays, 63 yards, 1:20.

Third quarter

- STL – Josh Brown 25-yard field goal, 8:28. Rams 13–10. Drive: 7 plays, 31 yards, 3:26.

Fourth quarter

- ARI – Larry Fitzgerald 21-yard pass from Derek Anderson (Jay Feely kick), 6:13. Cardinals 17–13. Drive: 7 plays, 86 yards, 3:56.

Top passers

- ARI – Derek Anderson – 22/41, 297 yards, TD
- STL – Sam Bradford – 32/55, 253 yards, TD, 3 INT

Top rushers

- ARI – Tim Hightower – 13 rushes, 54 yards, TD
- STL – Steven Jackson – 22 rushes, 81 yards

Top receivers

- ARI – Steve Breaston – 7 receptions, 132 yards
- STL – Mark Clayton – 10 receptions, 119 yards

The Cardinals began their season at the Edward Jones Dome for an NFC West match against the St. Louis Rams. The Cardinals scored first in the second quarter with kicker Jay Feely nailing a 22-yard field goal, which was replied by St. Louis when kicker Josh Brown made a 46-yard field goal. Arizona took the lead again with running back Tim Hightower making a 1-yard touchdown run, but failed to maintain it, with quarterback Sam Bradford making a 1-yard touchdown pass to wide receiver Laurent Robinson. In the third quarter, the Cardinals trailed for the first time when Brown nailed a 25-yard field goal, which they overcame in the fourth quarter when quarterback Derek Anderson made a 21-yard touchdown pass to wide receiver Larry Fitzgerald, giving Arizona a win.

With the win, Arizona began the season at 1–0.

=== Week 2: at Atlanta Falcons ===
Week 2: Arizona Cardinals at Atlanta Falcons – Game summary

Quarter	1	2	3	4	Total
Cardinals	0	7	0	0	7
Falcons	7	17	10	7	41

at Georgia Dome, Atlanta, Georgia

- Date: September 19
- Game time: 1:00 p.m. EDT/10:00 a.m. MST
- Game weather: None (indoor stadium)
- Game attendance: 66,824
- Referee: Jerome Boger
- TV announcers (Fox): Thom Brennaman, Brian Billick and Charissa Thompson
- Box Score

Game information

First quarter

- ATL – Roddy White 7-yard pass from Matt Ryan (Matt Bryant kick), 10:33. Falcons 7–0. Drive: 9 plays, 70 yards, 4:27.

Second quarter

- ATL – Matt Bryant 24-yard field goal, 13:06. Falcons 10–0. Drive: 6 plays, 37 yards, 3:24.
- ARI – Tim Hightower 80-yard run (Jay Feely kick), 12:54. Falcons 10–7. Drive: 1 play, 80 yards, 0:12.
- ATL – Jason Snelling 19-yard pass from Matt Ryan (Matt Bryant kick), 9:18. Falcons 17–7. Drive: 9 plays, 72 yards, 3:36.
- ATL – Jason Snelling 1-yard run (Matt Bryant kick), 3:31. Falcons 24–7. Drive: 8 plays, 78 yards, 3:58.

Third quarter

- ATL – Brian Finneran 12-yard pass from Matt Ryan (Matt Bryant kick), 13:18. Falcons 31–7. Drive: 3 plays, 14 yards, 0:45.
- ATL – Matt Bryant 35-yard field goal, 3:57. Falcons 34–7. Drive: 16 plays, 69 yards, 6:37.

Fourth quarter

- ATL – Jason Snelling 7-yard run (Matt Bryant kick), 3:05. Falcons 41–7. Drive: 11 plays, 80 yards, 6:41.

Top passers

- ARI – Derek Anderson – 17/31, 161 yards, 2 INT
- ATL – Matt Ryan – 21/32, 225 yards, 3 TD

Top rushers

- ARI – Tim Hightower – 11 rushes, 115 yards, TD
- ATL – Jason Snelling – 24 rushes, 129 yards, 2 TD

Top receivers

- ARI – Larry Fitzgerald – 7 receptions, 83 yards
- ATL – Roddy White – 7 receptions, 78 yards, TD

Hoping to maintain their current winning streak the Cardinals flew to Georgia Dome for an NFC duel with the Falcons. In the first quarter Arizona trailed early as quarterback Matt Ryan completed a 7-yard touchdown pass to wide receiver Roddy White, followed in the second quarter by kicker Matt Bryant hitting a 24-yard field goal. Arizona would reply with running back Tim Hightower getting an 80-yard touchdown run, but fell further behind when Ryan threw a 19-yard touchdown pass to fullback Jason Snelling, followed by Snelling getting a 1-yard touchdown run. In the third quarter the Cardinals struggled further when Ryan completed a 12-yard touchdown pass to wide receiver Brian Finneran, followed by Bryan nailing a 35-yard field goal. In the fourth quarter Arizona continued to struggle with fullback Jason Snelling getting a 7-yard touchdown run.

With the loss, the Cardinals fell to 1–1.

=== Week 3: vs. Oakland Raiders ===
Week 3: Oakland Raiders at Arizona Cardinals – Game summary

Quarter	1	2	3	4	Total
Raiders	13	7	0	3	23
Cardinals	10	7	7	0	24

at University of Phoenix Stadium, Glendale, Arizona

- Date: September 26
- Game time: 1:15 p.m. MST
- Game weather: None (retractable roof closed)
- Game attendance: 62,439
- Referee: Mike Carey
- TV announcers (CBS): Spero Dedes and Randy Cross
- Box Score

Game information

First quarter

- ARI – LaRod Stephens-Howling 102-yard kickoff return (Jay Feely kick), 14:46. Cardinals 7–0.
- OAK – Zach Miller 22-yard pass from Bruce Gradkowski (Sebastian Janikowski kick), 10:54. Tied 7–7. Drive: 3 plays, 59 yards, 0:52.
- OAK – Sebastian Janikowski 22-yard field goal, 6:42. Raiders 10–7. Drive: 5 plays, 24 yards, 1:22.
- ARI – Jay Feely 42-yard field goal, 3:55. Tied 10–10. Drive: 6 plays, 25 yards, 2:01.
- OAK – Sebastian Janikowski 54-yard field goal, 1:54. Raiders 13–10. Drive: 7 plays, 48 yards, 3:16.

Second quarter

- ARI – Steve Breaston 2-yard pass from Derek Anderson (Jay Feely kick), 10:44. Cardinals 17–13. Drive: 12 plays, 76 yards, 6:10.
- OAK – Darren McFadden 2-yard run (Sebastian Janikowski kick), 0:10. Raiders 20–17. Drive: 7 plays, 69 yards, 2:30.

Third quarter

- ARI – Larry Fitzgerald 8-yard pass from Derek Anderson (Jay Feely kick), 1:01. Cardinals 24–20. Drive: 7 plays, 69 yards, 4:02.

Fourth quarter

- OAK – Sebastian Janikowski 23-yard field goal, 7:59. Cardinals 24–23. Drive: 8 plays, 11 yards, 3:39.

Top passers

- OAK – Bruce Gradkowski – 17/34, 255 yards, TD, INT
- ARI – Derek Anderson – 12/26, 122 yards, 2 TD, INT

Top rushers

- OAK – Darren McFadden – 25 rushes, 105 yards, TD
- ARI – Beanie Wells – 14 rushes, 75 yards

Top receivers

- OAK – Louis Murphy – 5 receptions, 119 yards
- ARI – Steve Breaston – 4 receptions, 41 yards, TD

The Cardinals' third game was an Interconference duel with the Raiders. The Cardinals led early in the first quarter when running back LaRod Stephens-Howling returned a kickoff from his own goal line to the endzone running 102 yards for a touchdown. The Raiders replied and took the lead with quarterback Bruce Gradkowski completing a 22-yard touchdown pass to tight end Zach Miller, followed by kicker Sebastian Janikowski making a 22-yard field goal. Arizona replied with kicker Jay Feely kicking a 42-yard field goal. Then the Raiders replied with Janikowski making a 54-yard field goal. The Cardinals took the lead in the second quarter when quarterback Derek Anderson made a 2-yard touchdown pass to wide receiver Steve Breaston, but it didn't last very long after running back Darren McFadden got a 2-yard touchdown run. Arizona got the lead back in the third quarter when Anderson found wide receiver Larry Fitzgerald on an 8-yard touchdown pass. In the fourth quarter Oakland cut the lead when Janikowski made a 23-yard field goal. Janikowski missed three field goals in the game, giving Arizona the win.

With the close win, Arizona improved to 2–1.

=== Week 4: at San Diego Chargers ===
Week 4: Arizona Cardinals at San Diego Chargers – Game summary

Quarter	1	2	3	4	Total
Cardinals	0	7	0	3	10
Chargers	7	21	10	3	41

at Qualcomm Stadium, San Diego, California

- Date: October 3
- Game time: 1:15 p.m. MST & PDT
- Game weather: Sunny, 72 °F (22 °C)
- Game attendance: 62,189
- Referee: Gene Steratore
- TV announcers (Fox): Sam Rosen, Tim Ryan and Chris Myers
- Box Score

Game information

First quarter

- SD – Antonio Gates 33-yard pass from Philip Rivers (Nate Kaeding kick), 4:45. Chargers 7–0. Drive: 8 plays, 89 yards, 4:45.

Second quarter

- ARI – Kerry Rhodes 42-yard fumble return (Jay Feely kick), 13:34. Tied 7–7.
- SD – Mike Tolbert 5-yard run (Nate Kaeding kick), 10:31. Chargers 14–7. Drive: 5 plays, 63 yards, 3:03.
- SD – Antonio Gates 26-yard pass from Philip Rivers (Nate Kaeding kick), 3:30. Chargers 21–7. Drive: 9 plays, 65 yards, 4:14.
- SD – Shaun Phillips 31-yard interception return (Nate Kaeding kick), 2:30. Chargers 28–7.

Third quarter

- SD – Nate Kaeding 48-yard field goal, 3:55. Chargers 31–7. Drive: 6 plays, 32 yards, 3:41.
- SD – Ryan Matthews 15-yard run (Nate Kaeding kick), 1:31. Chargers 38–7. Drive: 1 play, 15 yards, 0:07.

Fourth quarter

- SD – Nate Kaeding 47-yard field goal, 10:49. Chargers 41–7. Drive: 8 plays, 35 yards, 4:11.
- ARI – Jay Feely 53-yard field goal, 3:17. Chargers 41–10. Drive: 8 plays, 29 yards, 4:05.

Top passers

- ARI – Max Hall – 8/14, 82 yards
- SD – Philip Rivers – 15/20, 241 yards, 2 TD

Top rushers

- ARI – Tim Hightower – 7 rushes, 24 yards
- SD – Mike Tolbert – 16 rushes, 100 yards, TD

Top receivers

- ARI – Larry Fitzgerald – 7 receptions, 56 yards
- SD – Antonio Gates – 7 receptions, 144 yards, 2 TD

Hoping to increase their winning streak the Cardinals flew to Qualcomm Stadium for an interconference duel with the Chargers. In the first quarter the Cardinals trailed early as quarterback Philip Rivers completed a 33-yard touchdown pass to tight end Antonio Gates, but they replied in the second quarter when free safety Kerry Rhodes recovered a fumble and ran 2 yards to the endzone for a touchdown. After that, the Cardinals fell further behind with fullback Mike Tolbert making a 5-yard touchdown run, followed by Rivers making a 26-yard touchdown pass to tight end Antonio Gates. The Cardinals had more problems when quarterback Derek Anderson's pass was intercepted by outside linebacker Shaun Phillips which converted into a 31-yard touchdown run. This was followed in the third quarter by kicker Nate Kaeding making a 48-yard field goal. Then running back Ryan Mathews got a 15-yard touchdown run. This was followed in the fourth quarter by Kaeding nailing a 47-yard field goal. The Cardinals tried to cut the lead, but only came away with kicker Jay Feely's 53-yard field goal.

With the loss, Arizona fell to 2–2.

=== Week 5: vs. New Orleans Saints ===
Week 5: New Orleans Saints at Arizona Cardinals – Game summary

Quarter	1	2	3	4	Total
Saints	10	3	0	7	20
Cardinals	0	10	3	17	30

at University of Phoenix Stadium, Glendale, Arizona

- Date: October 10
- Game time: 1:05 p.m. MST
- Game weather: None (retractable roof closed)
- Game attendance: 62,621
- Referee: Tony Corrente
- TV announcers (Fox): Chris Rose and Kurt Warner
- Box Score

Game information

First quarter

- NO – John Carney 31-yard field goal, 9:49. Saints 3–0. Drive: 7 plays, 36 yards, 3:07.
- NO – Jeremy Shockey 1-yard pass from Drew Brees (John Carney kick), 1:30. Saints 10–0. Drive: 11 plays, 76 yards, 5:32.

Second quarter

- ARI – Jay Feely 37-yard field goal, 11:15. Saints 10–3. Drive: 10 plays, 31 yards, 5:15.
- ARI – Levi Brown 2-yard fumble return (Jay Feely kick), 2:19. Tied 10–10.
- NO – John Carney 32-yard field goal, 1:10. Saints 13–10. Drive: 6 plays, 58 yards, 1:09.

Third quarter

- ARI – Jay Feely 44-yard field goal, 9:04. Tied 13–13. Drive: 7 plays, 34 yards, 4:17.

Fourth quarter

- ARI – Jay Feely 29-yard field goal, 11:39. Cardinals 16–13. Drive: 10 plays, 69 yards, 4:48.
- ARI – Kerry Rhodes 27-yard fumble return (Jay Feely kick), 10:39. Cardinals 23–13.
- NO – Robert Meachem 35-yard pass from Drew Brees (John Carney kick), 1:49. Cardinals 23–20. Drive: 7 plays, 80 yards, 1:36.
- ARI – Dominique Rodgers-Cromartie 28-yard interception return (Neil Rackers kick), 0:10. Cardinals 30–20.

Top passers

- NO – Drew Brees – 24/39, 279 yards, 2 TD, 3 INT
- ARI – Max Hall – 17/27, 168 yards, INT

Top rushers

- NO – Ladell Betts – 10 rushes, 44 yards
- ARI – Beanie Wells – 20 rushes, 35 yards

Top receivers

- NO – Marques Colston – 7 receptions, 97 yards
- ARI – Larry Fitzgerald – 7 receptions, 93 yards

Hoping to rebound from their loss to the Chargers the Cardinals played on home ground for an NFC duel with the Super Bowl champion Saints using a new starting quarterback: Max Hall (who had substituted in for Derek Anderson in the previous game). In the first quarter the Cardinals trailed early as kicker John Carney nailed a 31-yard field goal, followed by quarterback Drew Brees completing a 1-yard touchdown pass to tight end Jeremy Shockey. The Cardinals replied with kicker Jay Feely making a 37-yard field goal, followed by offensive tackle Levi Brown recovering a fumble and returning it 2 yards for a touchdown. In the third quarter the Cardinals replied and took the lead when Feely got a 44-yard field goal, followed the fourth quarter by Feely's 29-yard field goal. Then free safety Kerry Rhodes recovered a fumble and ran 27 yards to the endzone for a touchdown. The lead was broken down with Brees making a 35-yard touchdown pass to wide receiver Robert Meachem, but the Cardinals managed to pull away when Brees' pass was intercepted by cornerback Dominique Rodgers-Cromartie and returned 28 yards to the endzone for a touchdown.

With the win, Arizona went into their bye week at 3–2.

=== Week 7: at Seattle Seahawks ===
Week 7: Arizona Cardinals at Seattle Seahawks – Game summary

Quarter	1	2	3	4	Total
Cardinals	0	0	7	3	10
Seahawks	3	7	9	3	22

at Qwest Field, Seattle, Washington

- Date: October 24
- Game time: 1:05 p.m. MST & PDT
- Game weather: Cloudy, 52 °F (11 °C)
- Game attendance: 67,132
- Referee: Jeff Triplette
- TV announcers (Fox): Chris Myers, Brian Billick and Charissa Thompson
- Box Score

Game information

First quarter

- SEA – Olindo Mare 20-yard field goal, 7:29. Seahawks 3–0. Drive: 14 plays, 78 yards, 7:31.

Second quarter

- SEA – Mike Williams 2-yard pass from Matt Hasselbeck (Olindo Mare kick), 5:46. Seahawks 10–0. Drive: 2 plays, 2 yards, 0:09.

Third quarter

- SEA – Olindo Mare 31-yard field goal, 12:11. Seahawks 13–0. Drive: 4 plays, -2 yards, 1:55.
- SEA – Olindo Mare 51-yard field goal, 10:57. Seahawks 16–0. Drive: 4 plays, -17 yards, 1:14.
- ARI – Beanie Wells 2-yard run (Jay Feely kick), 5:43. Seahawks 16–7. Drive: 8 plays, 70 yards, 5:14.
- SEA – Olindo Mare 24-yard field goal, 0:49. Seahawks 19–7. Drive: 14 plays, 78 yards, 4:54.

Fourth quarter

- ARI – Jay Feely 24-yard field goal, 14:48. Seahawks 19–10. Drive: 5 plays, 27 yards, 1:01.
- SEA – Olindo Mare 26-yard field goal, 7:28. Seahawks 22–10. Drive: 12 plays, 57 yards, 7:20.

Top passers

- ARI – Derek Anderson – 8/17, 96 yards
- SEA – Matt Hasselbeck – 20/38, 192 yards, TD

Top rushers

- ARI – Tim Hightower – 6 rushes, 59 yards
- SEA – Marshawn Lynch – 24 rushes, 89 yards

Top receivers

- ARI – Andre Roberts – 2 receptions, 40 yards
- SEA – Mike Williams – 11 receptions, 87 yards, TD

Coming off their bye week the Cardinals flew to Qwest Field for an NFC West rivalry match against the Seahawks. In the first quarter the Cardinals trailed early as kicker Olindo Mare got a 20-yard field goal. Followed in the second quarter by quarterback Matt Hasselbeck making a 2-yard touchdown pass to wide receiver Mike Williams. The Cardinals fell further behind in the third quarter with Mare nailing a 31 and a 51-yard field goal. The Cardinals replied with running back Beanie Wells getting a 2-yard touchdown run. The Seahawks continued to score with Mare hitting a 24-yard field goal, but the Cardinals responded in the fourth quarter with kicker Jay Feely getting a 24-yard field goal. The Seahawks pulled away with Mare making a 26-yard field goal.

With the loss, the Cardinals fell to 3–3.

=== Week 8: vs. Tampa Bay Buccaneers ===
Week 8: Tampa Bay Buccaneers at Arizona Cardinals – Game summary

Quarter	1	2	3	4	Total
Buccaneers	7	17	7	7	38
Cardinals	7	7	14	7	35

at University of Phoenix Stadium, Glendale, Arizona

- Date: October 31
- Game time: 1:15 p.m. MST
- Game weather: None (retractable roof closed)
- Game attendance: 61,857
- Referee: Ron Winter
- TV announcers (Fox): Chris Myers, Brian Billick and Jaime Maggio
- Box Score

Game information

First quarter

- ARI – Larry Fitzgerald 3-yard pass from Max Hall (Jay Feely kick), 6:25. Cardinals 7–0. Drive: 9 plays, 61 yards, 4:38.
- TB – Geno Hayes 41-yard interception return (Connor Barth kick), 4:15. Tied 7–7.

Second quarter

- ARI – Beanie Wells 1-yard run (Jay Feely kick), 10:17. Cardinals 14–7. Drive: 4 plays, 16 yards, 2:03.
- TB – Mike Williams 47-yard pass from Josh Freeman (Connor Barth kick), 8:59. Tied 14–14. Drive: 3 plays, 80 yards, 1:18.
- TB – Aqib Talib 45-yard interception return (Connor Barth kick), 6:33. Buccaneers 21–14.
- TB – Connor Barth 21-yard field goal, 0:00. Buccaneers 24–14. Drive: 12 plays, 94 yards, 3:15.

Third quarter

- TB – LeGarrette Blount 15-yard run (Connor Barth kick), 4:35. Buccaneers 31–14. Drive: 8 plays, 80 yards, 4:47.
- ARI – LaRod Stephens-Howling 30-yard run (Jay Feely kick), 0:56. Buccaneers 31–21. Drive: 7 plays, 76 yards, 3:36.
- ARI – Gerald Hayes 21-yard fumble return (Jay Feely kick), 0:33. Buccaneers 31–28.

Fourth quarter

- ARI – Larry Fitzgerald 5-yard pass from Derek Anderson (Jay Feely kick), 9:41. Cardinals 35–31. Drive: 4 plays, 48 yards, 1:56.
- TB – LaGarrette Blount 1-yard run (Connor Barth kick), 5:13. Buccaneers 38–35. Drive: 7 plays, 74 yards, 4:28.

Top passers

- TB – Josh Freeman – 18/25, 278 yards, TD
- ARI – Derek Anderson – 16/24, 234 yards, TD, 2 INT

Top rushers

- TB – LaGarrette Blount – 22 rushes, 120 yards, 2 TD
- ARI – Beanie Wells – 16 rushes, 50 yards, TD

Top receivers

- TB – Mike Williams – 4 receptions, 105 yards, TD
- ARI – Steve Breaston – 8 receptions, 147 yards

The Cardinals' seventh game was an NFC duel with the Buccaneers at University of Phoenix Stadium. In the first quarter the Cardinals took the lead when quarterback Max Hall made a 3-yard touchdown pass to wide receiver Larry Fitzgerald. The Buccaneers replied with outside linebacker Geno Hayes returning an interception 41 yards for a touchdown. The Cardinals led again in the second quarter with running back Beanie Wells getting a 1-yard touchdown run, but the Buccaneers went on a scoring rally with quarterback Josh Freeman making a 47-yard touchdown pass to wide receiver Mike Williams, and cornerback Aqib Talib returning an interception 45 yards for a touchdown. This was followed by kicker Connor Barth hitting a 21-yard field goal, and in the third quarter with running back LeGarrette Blount getting a 15-yard touchdown run. The Cardinals also went on a rally to take the lead back with running back LaRod Stephens-Howling making a 30-yard touchdown run, which was followed by inside linebacker Gerald Hayes recovering a fumble and running 21 yards to the endzone for a touchdown. Then quarterback Derek Anderson found Fitzgerald on a 5-yard touchdown pass. The Buccaneers scored once more to take the win with Blount getting a 1-yard touchdown run.

With the loss, Arizona recorded back to back losses for the first time since the 2008 season, and fell to 3–4.

=== Week 9: at Minnesota Vikings ===
Week 9: Arizona Cardinals at Minnesota Vikings – Game summary

Quarter	1	2	3	4	OT	Total
Cardinals	0	14	7	3	0	24
Vikings	0	10	0	14	3	27

at Mall of America Field at Hubert H. Humphrey Metrodome, Minneapolis, Minnesota

- Date: November 7
- Game time: 12:05 p.m. CST/11:05 a.m. MST
- Game weather: None (indoor stadium)
- Game attendance: 64,120
- Referee: Bill Leavy
- TV announcers (Fox): Kenny Albert, Daryl Johnston and Tony Siragusa
- Box Score

Game information

First quarter

- No scoring plays

Second quarter

- MIN – Adrian Peterson 12-yard pass from Brett Favre (Ryan Longwell kick), 12:17. Vikings 7–0. Drive: 5 plays, 52 yards, 2:43.
- ARI – LaRod Stephens-Howling 96-yard kickoff return (Jay Feely kick), 12:04. Tied 7–7.
- MIN – Ryan Longwell 21-yard field goal, 6:22. Vikings 10–7. Drive: 11 plays, 61 yards, 5:42.
- ARI – Andre Roberts 30-yard pass from Derek Anderson (Jay Feely kick), 0:29. Cardinals 14–10. Drive: 7 plays, 81 yards, 1:01.

Third quarter

- ARI – Michael Adams 30-yard fumble return (Jay Feely kick), 14:48. Cardinals 21–10.

Fourth quarter

- ARI – Jay Feely 22-yard field goal, 12:40. Cardinals 24–10. Drive: 14 plays, 89 yards, 7:36.
- MIN – Adrian Peterson 4-yard run (Ryan Longwell kick), 3:34. Cardinals 24–17. Drive: 3 plays, 40 yards, 1:05.
- MIN – Visanthe Shiancoe 25-yard pass from Brett Favre (Ryan Longwell kick), 0:27. Tied 24–24. Drive: 5 plays, 77 yards, 1:57.

Overtime

- MIN – Ryan Longwell 35-yard field goal, 9:42. Vikings 27–24. Drive: 6 plays, 51 yards, 3:56.

Top passers

- ARI – Derek Anderson – 15/26, 179 yards, TD
- MIN – Brett Favre – 36/47, 446 yards, 2 TD, 2 INT

Top rushers

- ARI – Tim Hightower – 13 rushes, 39 yards
- MIN – Adrian Peterson – 15 rushes, 81 yards, TD

Top receivers

- ARI – Larry Fitzgerald – 7 receptions, 107 yards
- MIN – Percy Harvin – 9 receptions, 126 yards

Hoping to snap their current losing streak the Cardinals flew to Hubert H. Humphrey Metrodome for an NFC duel with the Vikings. In the second quarter the Cardinals trailed early as quarterback Brett Favre got a 12-yard touchdown pass to running back Adrian Peterson. They immediately replied with a 96-yard kickoff return for a touchdown by running back LaRod Stephens-Howling. The Vikings responded with kicker Ryan Longwell nailing a 21-yard field goal. The Cardinals replied a took the lead with quarterback Derek Anderson completing a 30-yard touchdown pass to wide receiver Andre Roberts. This was followed by defensive back Michael Adams returning a fumble 30 yards for a touchdown, and with kicker Jay Feely making a 22-yard field goal. The lead was closed down by Peterson as he got a 4-yard touchdown run, and by quarterback Brett Favre's 25-yard touchdown pass to tight end Visanthe Shiancoe. After overtime the decision was made when Longwell successfully made a 35-yard field goal to give the Cardinals a loss, bringing their record down to 3–5.

=== Week 10: vs. Seattle Seahawks ===
Week 10: Seattle Seahawks at Arizona Cardinals – Game summary

Quarter	1	2	3	4	Total
Seahawks	7	10	9	10	36
Cardinals	7	3	0	8	18

at University of Phoenix Stadium, Glendale, Arizona

- Date: November 15
- Game time: 2:15 p.m. MST
- Game weather: None (retractable roof closed)
- Game attendance: 61,904
- Referee: Scott Green
- TV announcers (Fox): Thom Brennamen and Brian Billick
- Box Score

Game information

First quarter

- ARI – Tim Hightower 2-yard run (Jay Feely kick), 12:48. Cardinals 7–0. Drive: 6 plays, 99 yards, 2:32.
- SEA – Marshawn Lynch 1-yard run (Olindo Mare kick), 7:44. Tied 7–7. Drive: 12 plays, 77 yards, 5:04.

Second quarter

- SEA – Olindo Mare 41-yard field goal, 13:23. Seahawks 10–7. Drive: 8 plays, 67 yards, 3:18.
- ARI – Jay Feely 23-yard field goal, 8:11. Tied 10–10. Drive: 8 plays, 71 yards, 1:09.
- SEA – Deon Butler 63-yard pass from Matt Hasselbeck (Olindo Mare kick), 7:28. Seahawks 17–10. Drive: 2 plays, 80 yards, 0:43.

Third quarter

- SEA – Olindo Mare 34-yard field goal, 7:05. Seahawks 20–10. Drive: 10 plays, 64 yards, 4:52.
- SEA – Olindo Mare 19-yard field goal, 4:50. Seahawks 23–10. Drive: 6 plays, 31 yards, 2:02.
- SEA – Olindo Mare 23-yard field goal, 1:15. Seahawks 26–10. Drive: 6 plays, 12 yards, 2:45.

Fourth quarter

- SEA – Olindo Mare 19-yard field goal, 12:18. Seahawks 29–10. Drive: 7 plays, 10 yards, 2:55.
- ARI – Early Doucet 2-yard pass from Derek Anderson (Derek Anderson–Larry Fitzgerald pass), 7:52. Seahawks 29–18. Drive: 6 plays, 85 yards, 3:14.
- SEA – Justin Forsett 4-yard run (Olindo Mare kick), 3:49. Seahawks 36–18. Drive: 3 plays, 10 yards, 0:59.

Top passers

- SEA – Matt Hasselbeck – 22/34, 333 yards, TD
- ARI – Derek Anderson – 23/45, 322 yards, TD, INT

Top rushers

- SEA – Justin Forsett – 9 rushes, 64 yards, TD
- ARI – Tim Hightower – 13 rushes, 39 yards, TD

Top receivers

- SEA – Mike Williams – 11 receptions, 145 yards
- ARI – Steve Breaston – 4 receptions, 98 yards

The Cardinals' ninth game was an NFC West rivalry re-match against the Seahawks. In the first quarter the Cardinals took the early lead as running back Tim Hightower got a 2-yard touchdown run. The Seahawks replied with running back Marshawn Lynch getting a 1-yard touchdown run. The Cardinals trailed with kicker Olindo Mare getting a 41-yard field goal, but they answed back with kicker Jay Feely nailing a 23-yard field goal. The Cardinals struggled further with quarterback Matt Hasselbeck completing a 63-yard touchdown pass to wide receiver Deon Butler. This was followed in the third quarter by a 34, 19 and 23-yard field goal from Mare. In the fourth quarter Mare got another 19-yard field goal to put the Seahawks up 29–10. The Cardinals responded with quarterback Derek Anderson making a 2-yard touchdown pass to wide receiver Early Doucet (with a successful 2-point conversion as Anderson found wide receiver Larry Fitzgerald), but the Seahawks put the game away with running back Justin Forsett getting a 4-yard touchdown run.

With the loss, Arizona fell to 3–6.

=== Week 11: at Kansas City Chiefs ===
Week 11: Arizona Cardinals at Kansas City Chiefs – Game summary

Quarter	1	2	3	4	Total
Cardinals	3	0	3	7	13
Chiefs	0	14	7	10	31

at Arrowhead Stadium, Kansas City, Missouri

- Date: November 21
- Game time: 12:00 p.m. CST/11:00 a.m. MST
- Game weather: Cloudy, 66 °F (19 °C)
- Game attendance: 66,247
- Referee: Walt Coleman
- TV announcers (Fox): Ron Pitts and John Lynch
- Box Score

Game information

First quarter

- ARI – Jay Feely 36-yard field goal, 10:24. Cardinals 3–0. Drive: 9 plays, 51 yards, 4:36.

Second quarter

- KC – Dwayne Bowe 1-yard pass from Matt Cassel (Ryan Succop kick), 13:35. Chiefs 7–3. Drive: 4 plays, 38 yards, 1:58.
- KC – Thomas Jones 1-yard run (Ryan Succop kick), 10:14. Chiefs 14–3. Drive: 5 plays, 68 yards, 2:12.

Third quarter

- KC – Thomas Jones 3-yard run (Ryan Succop kick), 9:59. Chiefs 21–3. Drive: 9 plays, 80 yards, 5:01.
- ARI – Jay Feely 29-yard field goal, 4:55. Chiefs 21–6. Drive: 10 plays, 69 yards, 5:04.

Fourth quarter

- KC – Ryan Succop 23-yard field goal, 8:12. Chiefs 24–6. Drive: 10 plays, 57 yards, 5:23.
- KC – Dwayne Bowe 38-yard pass from Matt Cassel (Ryan Succop kick), 4:20. Chiefs 31–6. Drive: 3 plays, 42 yards, 1:19.
- ARI – Larry Fitzgerald 3-yard pass from Derek Anderson (Jay Feely kick), 0:00. Chiefs 31–13. Drive: 14 plays, 83 yards, 4:20.

Top passers

- ARI – Derek Anderson – 25/46, 295 yards, TD
- KC – Matt Cassel – 15/24, 193 yards, 2 TD

Top rushers

- ARI – Tim Hightower – 12 rushes, 62 yards
- KC – Jamaal Charles – 12 rushes, 88 yards

Top receivers

- ARI – Steve Breaston – 5 receptions, 92 yards
- KC – Dwayne Bowe – 6 receptions, 109 yards, 2 TD

Hoping to break their current losing streak the Cardinals flew to Arrowhead Stadium for an interconference duel with the Chiefs. The Cardinals scored with kicker Jay Feely hitting a 36-yard field goal, but they fell behind with quarterback Matt Cassel completing a 1-yard touchdown pass to wide receiver Dwayne Bowe. This was followed by running back Thomas Jones getting a 1 and a 3-yard touchdown run. The Cardinals responded with Feely making a 29-yard field goal, but they struggled further with kicker Ryan Succop getting a 23-yard field goal, followed by Cassel throwing a 38-yard touchdown pass to Bowe. The Cardinals cut the lead with quarterback Derek Anderson completing a 3-yard touchdown pass to wide receiver Larry Fitzgerald.

With the loss, the Cardinals fell to 3–7.

=== Week 12: vs. San Francisco 49ers ===
Week 12: San Francisco 49ers at Arizona Cardinals – Game summary

Quarter	1	2	3	4	Total
49ers	14	7	3	3	27
Cardinals	3	3	0	0	6

at University of Phoenix Stadium, Glendale, Arizona

- Date: November 29
- Game time: 6:40 p.m. MST
- Game weather: None (retractable roof closed)
- Game attendance: 62,308
- Referee: Gene Steratore
- TV announcers (ESPN): Mike Tirico, Ron Jaworski, Jon Gruden, Suzy Kolber and Michele Tafoya
- Box Score

Game information

First quarter

- SF – Michael Crabtree 38-yard pass from Troy Smith (Shane Andrus kick), 9:35. 49ers 7–0. Drive: 1 play, 38 yards, 0:07.
- ARI – Jay Feely 31-yard field goal, 5:56. 49ers 7–3. Drive: 7 plays, 55 yards, 3:39.
- SF – Anthony Dixon 1-yard run (Shane Andrus kick), 0:29. 49ers 14–3. Drive: 10 plays, 55 yards, 5:27.

Second quarter

- SF – Brian Westbrook 8-yard run (Shane Andrus kick), 7:23. 49ers 21–3. Drive: 6 plays, 42 yards, 2:44.
- ARI – Jay Feely 39-yard field goal, 2:16. 49ers 21–6. Drive: 10 plays, 40 yards, 5:07.

Third quarter

- SF – Shane Andrus 38-yard field goal, 2:38. 49ers 24–6. Drive: 7 plays, 44 yards, 3:53.

Fourth quarter

- SF – Shane Andrus 26-yard field goal, 12:43. 49ers 27–6. Drive: 11 plays, 42 yards, 4:03.

Top passers

- SF – Troy Smith – 11/23, 129 yards, TD, INT
- ARI – Derek Anderson – 16/35, 196 yards, INT

Top rushers

- SF – Brian Westbrook – 23 rushes, 136 yards, TD
- ARI – Beanie Wells – 5 rushes, 13 yards

Top receivers

- SF – Michael Crabtree – 2 receptions, 48 yards, TD
- ARI – Early Doucet – 5 receptions, 60 yards

Trying to snap a five-game losing streak, the Cardinals went home, donned their alternate uniforms again, and played a Week 12 NFC West duel with the San Francisco 49ers on Monday night. Arizona trailed early in the first quarter as 49ers quarterback Troy Smith completed a 38-yard touchdown pass to wide receiver Michael Crabtree. The Cardinals answered with a 31-yard field goal from kicker Jay Feely, but San Francisco struck back with running back Anthony Dixon getting a 1-yard touchdown run. The 49ers added onto their lead in the second quarter with running back Brian Westbrook getting an 8-yard touchdown run. Arizona would respond with Feely's 39-yard field goal. From there, San Francisco pulled away in the third quarter as 49ers kicker Shane Andrus made a 38-yard field goal, followed by his 26-yard field goal in the fourth quarter.

With the loss, the Cardinals fell to 3–8.

=== Week 13: vs. St. Louis Rams ===
Week 13: St. Louis Rams at Arizona Cardinals – Game summary

Quarter	1	2	3	4	Total
Rams	3	6	7	3	19
Cardinals	6	0	0	0	6

at University of Phoenix Stadium, Glendale, Arizona

- Date: December 5
- Game time: 2:15 p.m. MST
- Game weather: None (retractable roof closed)
- Game attendance: 61,874
- Referee: Clete Blakeman
- TV announcers (Fox): Chris Myers and Kurt Warner
- Box Score

Game information

First quarter

- ARI – Jay Feely 45-yard field goal, 11:14. Cardinals 3–0. Drive: 8 plays, 44 yards, 3:46.
- ARI – Jay Feely 41-yard field goal, 5:26. Cardinals 6–0. Drive: 9 plays, 65 yards, 4:40.
- STL – Josh Brown 28-yard field goal, 0:24. Cardinals 6–3. Drive: 10 plays, 59 yards, 5:02.

Second quarter

- STL – Josh Brown 52-yard field goal, 10:23. Tied 6–6. Drive: 7 plays, 15 yards, 3:30.
- STL – Josh Brown 20-yard field goal, 0:04. Rams 9–6. Drive: 12 plays, 65 yards, 3:11.

Third quarter

- STL – Steven Jackson 27-yard run (Josh Brown kick), 7:40. Rams 16–6. Drive: 10 plays, 85 yards, 4:42.

Fourth quarter

- STL – Josh Brown 43-yard field goal, 14:55. Rams 19–6. Drive: 7 plays, 16 yards, 3:09.

Top passers

- STL – Sam Bradford – 18/29, 187 yards, INT
- ARI – Derek Anderson – 7/20, 93 yards, INT

Top rushers

- STL – Steven Jackson – 28 rushes, 102 yards, TD
- ARI – Tim Hightower – 15 rushes, 81 yards

Top receivers

- STL – Brandon Gibson – 6 receptions, 54 yards
- ARI – Steve Breaston – 3 receptions, 62 yards

Hoping to break a six-game losing streak the Cardinals played on home ground for a division rivalry match against the Rams. The Cardinals took the early lead as kicker Jay Feely got a 45 and a 41-yard field goal. They soon trailed after kicker Josh Brown hit a 28, 52 and 20-yard field goal. This was followed in the third quarter by running back Steven Jackson getting a 27-yard touchdown run, and with Brown making a 43-yard field goal.

With the loss, the Cardinals fell to 3–9.

=== Week 14: vs. Denver Broncos ===
Week 14: Denver Broncos at Arizona Cardinals – Game summary

Quarter	1	2	3	4	Total
Broncos	3	0	0	10	13
Cardinals	3	13	3	24	43

at University of Phoenix Stadium, Glendale, Arizona

- Date: December 12
- Game time: 2:15 p.m. MST
- Game weather: None (retractable roof closed)
- Game attendance: 62,223
- Referee: Jerome Boger
- TV announcers (CBS): Bill Macatee and Rich Gannon
- Box Score

Game information

First quarter

- DEN – Stephen Hauschka 32-yard field goal, 10:36. Broncos 3–0. Drive: 11 plays, 73 yards, 4:24.
- ARI – Jay Feely 36-yard field goal, 4:35. Tied 3–3. Drive: 4 plays, 5 yards, 0:58.

Second quarter

- ARI – Jay Feely 48-yard field goal, 11:50. Cardinals 6–3. Drive: 7 plays, 17 yards, 2:58.
- ARI – Jay Feely 5-yard run (Jay Feely kick), 4:02. Cardinals 13–3. Drive: 5 plays, 24 yards, 2:01.
- ARI – Jay Feely 55-yard field goal, 0:02. Cardinals 16–3. Drive: 8 plays, 37 yards, 1:42.

Third quarter

- ARI – Jay Feely 23-yard field goal, 9:40. Cardinals 19–3.Drive: 10 plays, 72 yards, 5:20.

Fourth quarter

- ARI – Jay Feely 49-yard field goal, 14:55. Cardinals 22–3. Drive: 4 plays, 8 yards, 1:04.
- DEN – Stephen Hauschka 30-yard field goal, 11:20. Cardinals 22–6. Drive: 7 plays, 13 yards, 2:16.
- ARI – Tim Hightower 8-yard run (Jay Feely kick), 6:07. Cardinals 29–6. Drive: 8 plays, 79 yards, 5:13.
- DEN – Knowshon Moreno 1-yard run (Stephen Hauschka kick), 3:31. Cardinals 29–13. Drive: 7 plays, 71 yards, 2:36.
- ARI – Tim Hightower 35-yard run (Jay Feely kick), 3:09. Cardinals 36–13. Drive: 3 plays, 41 yards, 0:22.
- ARI – Darnell Dockett 40-yard fumble return (Jay Feely kick), 2:42. Cardinals 43–13.

Top passers

- DEN – Kyle Orton – 19/41, 166 yards, 3 INT
- ARI – John Skelton – 15/37, 146 yards

Top rushers

- DEN – Knowshon Moreno – 19 rushes, 81 yards, TD
- ARI – Tim Hightower – 18 rushes, 148 yards, 2 TD

Top receivers

- DEN – Jabar Gaffney – 3 receptions, 48 yards
- ARI – Larry Fitzgerald – 6 receptions, 72 yards

The Cardinals thirteenth game was an interconference duel with the Broncos. The Cardinals trailed early as Broncos kicker Steven Hauschka nailed a 32-yard field goal, but rallied to take the lead with kicker Jay Feely making a 36 and a 48-yard field goal, followed by his 5-yard touchdown run to the endzone, then he made a 55, 23 and a 49-yard field goal to put the Cardinals up 22–3. The lead was narrowed slightly as Hauschka got a 30-yard field goal, but the Cardinals increased their lead with running back Tim Hightower getting an 8-yard touchdown run. The Broncos tried to break down the lead as running back Knowshon Moreno got a 1-yard touchdown run, but the Cardinals pulled away with Hightower getting a 35-yard touchdown run, followed by defensive end Darnell Dockett recovering a fumble in the endzone for a touchdown.

With the win, Arizona improved to 4–9, and got their first-ever win over the Broncos in the franchise's history, though they tied in 1973 and never played the Broncos between 1978 and 1988. Despite losing nine games on the year, the Cardinals were still playoff-eligible in the very weak NFC West.

=== Week 15: at Carolina Panthers ===
Week 15: Arizona Cardinals at Carolina Panthers – Game summary

Quarter	1	2	3	4	Total
Cardinals	0	3	0	9	12
Panthers	6	7	6	0	19

at Bank of America Stadium, Charlotte, North Carolina

- Date: December 19
- Game time: 1:00 p.m. EST/11:00 a.m. MST
- Game weather: Sunny, 42 °F (6 °C)
- Game attendance: 71,849
- Referee: Tony Corrente
- TV announcers (Fox): Ron Pitts, John Lynch and Nischelle Turner
- Box Score

Game information

First quarter

- CAR – John Kasay 28-yard field goal, 10:22. Panthers 3–0. Drive: 6 plays, 57 yards, 2:27.
- CAR – John Kasay 29-yard field goal, 0:14. Panthers 6–0. Drive: 14 plays, 80 yards, 6:42.

Second quarter

- CAR – Jeff King 16-yard pass from Jimmy Clausen (John Kasay kick), 8:42. Panthers 13–0. Drive: 1 play, 16 yards, 0:07.
- ARI – Jay Feely 23-yard field goal, 0:36. Panthers 13–3. Drive: 12 plays, 46 yards, 4:19.

Third quarter

- CAR – John Kasay 24-yard field goal, 12:12. Panthers 16–3. Drive: 6 plays, 31 yards, 2:48.
- CAR – John Kasay 43-yard field goal, 0:27. Panthers 19–3. Drive: 10 plays, 21 yards, 6:29.

Fourth quarter

- ARI – Steve Breaston 10-yard fumble return (run failed), 5:41. Panthers 19–9.
- ARI – Jay Feely 30-yard field goal, 0:54. Panthers 19–12. Drive: 6 plays, 60 yards, 0:55.

Top passers

- ARI – John Skelton – 17/33, 196 yards, INT
- CAR – Jimmy Clausen – 13/19, 141 yards, TD

Top rushers

- ARI – Tim Hightower – 6 rushes, 16 yards
- CAR – Jonathan Stewart – 27 rushes, 137 yards

Top receivers

- ARI – Larry Fitzgerald – 9 receptions, 125 yards
- CAR – Brandon LaFell – 3 receptions, 33 yards

Coming off their win over the Broncos the Cardinals flew to Bank of America Stadium for an NFC duel with the Panthers. In the first quarter the Cardinals trailed early as kicker John Kasay hit a 28 and a 29-yard field goal. This was followed in the second quarter by quarterback Jimmy Clausen completing a 16-yard touchdown pass to tight end Jeff King. The Cardinals answered with kicker Jay Feely nailing a 23-yard field goal, but struggled further after Kasay made a 24 and a 43-yard field goal. The Cardinals tried to come back with Steve Breaston recovering a fumble in the end zone for a touchdown (with a failed two-point conversion) and then with Feely getting a 30-yard field goal, but the Panthers' defense was enough to secure themselves the win.

With the loss, Arizona fell to 4–10, and was officially ousted from the postseason for the first time since 2007.

=== Week 16: vs. Dallas Cowboys ===
Week 16: Dallas Cowboys at Arizona Cardinals – Game summary

Quarter	1	2	3	4	Total
Cowboys	0	10	10	6	26
Cardinals	14	7	0	6	27

at University of Phoenix Stadium, Glendale, Arizona

- Date: December 25
- Game time: 5:30 p.m. MST
- Game weather: None (retractable roof closed)
- Game attendance: 66,971
- Referee: Jeff Triplette
- TV announcers (NFL Network): Bob Papa, Matt Millen and Joe Theismann
- Box Score

Game information

First quarter

- ARI – Dominique Rodgers-Cromartie 32-yard interception return (Jay Feely kick), 12:47. Cardinals 7–0.
- ARI – Greg Toler 66-yard interception return (Jay Feely kick), 8:24. Cardinals 14–0.

Second quarter

- DAL – David Buehler 42-yard field goal, 12:49. Cardinals 14–3. Drive: 10 plays, 37 yards, 4:56.
- ARI – Andre Roberts 74-yard pass from John Skelton (Jay Feely kick), 11:57. Cardinals 21–3. Drive: 2 plays, 80 yards, 0:52.
- DAL – Jason Witten 2-yard pass from Jon Kitna (David Buehler kick), 5:11. Cardinals 21–10. Drive: 13 plays, 81 yards, 6:46.

Third quarter

- DAL – David Buehler 53-yard field goal, 6:46. Cardinals 21–13. Drive: 5 plays, 26 yards, 1:59.
- DAL – Marion Barber III 24-yard run (David Buehler kick), 1:58. Cardinals 21–20. Drive: 6 plays, 47 yards, 3:42.

Fourth quarter

- ARI – Jay Feely 49-yard field goal, 3:45. Cardinals 24–20. Drive: 9 plays, 49 yards, 5:05.
- DAL – Miles Austin 37-yard pass from Stephen McGee (kick failed), 1:41. Cowboys 26–24. Drive: 8 plays, 80 yards, 2:04.
- ARI – Jay Feely 48-yard field goal, 0:05. Cardinals 27–26. Drive: 9 plays, 46 yards, 1:36.

Top passers

- DAL – Jon Kitna – 12/20, 115 yards, TD, 2 INT
- ARI – John Skelton – 11/25, 183 yards, TD

Top rushers

- DAL – Felix Jones – 16 rushes, 77 yards
- ARI – Beanie Wells – 11 rushes, 47 yards

Top receivers

- DAL – Miles Austin – 6 receptions, 115 yards, TD
- ARI – Andre Roberts – 5 receptions, 110 yards, TD

This game marked the second time the Cardinals hosted the Cowboys on Christmas Day, after a 1995 Monday Night Football contest.

=== Week 17: at San Francisco 49ers ===
Week 17: Arizona Cardinals at San Francisco 49ers – Game summary

Quarter	1	2	3	4	Total
Cardinals	0	7	0	0	7
49ers	7	3	21	7	38

at Candlestick Park, San Francisco, California

- Date: January 2
- Game time: 1:15 p.m. PST/2:150 p.m. MST
- Game weather: Rain, 49 °F (9 °C)
- Game attendance: 69,732
- Referee: Mike Carey
- TV announcers (Fox): Chris Myers and Jim Mora
- Box Score

Game information

First quarter

- SF – Ted Ginn Jr. 37-yard pass from Alex Smith (Jeff Reed kick), 4:45. 49ers 7–0. Drive: 1 play, 37 yards, 0:07.

Second quarter

- SF – Jeff Reed 39-yard field goal, 14:18. 49ers 10–0. Drive: 8 plays, 36 yards, 3:46.
- ARI – Larry Fitzgerald 10-yard pass from John Skelton (Jay Feely kick), 7:30. 49ers 10–7. Drive: 7 plays, 37 yards, 2:45.

Third quarter

- SF – Vernon Davis 59-yard pass from Alex Smith (Jeff Reed kick), 13:02. 49ers 17–7. Drive: 5 plays, 75 yards, 1:58.
- SF – Brian Westbrook 6-yard run (Jeff Reed kick), 8:50. 49ers 24–7. Drive: 6 plays, 78 yards, 3:08.
- SF – Brian Westbrook 6-yard run (Jeff Reed kick), 6:51. 49ers 31–7. Drive: 2 plays, 8 yards, 0:40.

Fourth quarter

- SF – Tarell Brown 62-yard interception return (Jeff Reed kick), 4:01. 49ers 38–7.

Top passers

- ARI – Richard Bartel – 16/28, 150 yards, INT
- SF – Alex Smith – 15/29, 276 yards, 2 TD

Top rushers

- ARI – Tim Hightower – 12 rushes, 30 yards
- SF – Brian Westbrook – 13 rushes, 79 yards, 2 TD

Top receivers

- ARI – Larry Fitzgerald – 11 receptions, 125 yards, TD
- SF – Vernon Davis – 3 receptions, 96 yards, TD

The Cardinals' final game was an NFC West rivalry rematch against the 49ers. The Cardinals trailed early as quarterback Alex Smith completed a 37-yard touchdown pass to wide receiver Ted Ginn Jr., followed in the second quarter by kicker Jeff Reed making a 39-yard field goal. The Cardinals narrowed the lead as quarterback John Skelton completed a 10-yard touchdown pass to wide receiver Larry Fitzgerald, but fell further behind after Smith completed a 59-yard touchdown pass to tight end Vernon Davis, followed by running back Brian Westbrook running 6 yards to the endzone for a touchdown twice in succession. Arizona's offense continued to have problems as Richard Bartel's pass was intercepted by cornerback Tarell Brown and returned 62 yards for a touchdown.

With the loss, the Cardinals finished with a 5–11 record.
