= Richard Bartel =

American football player and coach (born 1983)

- Bartel warms up before a Tarleton game at Texas A&M-Commerce during the 2006 season

No. 4, 13, 10, 2
- Position: Quarterback

Personal information
- Born: February 3, 1983 (age 43); San Antonio, Texas, U.S.
- Listed height: 6 ft 4 in (1.93 m)
- Listed weight: 235 lb (107 kg)

Career information
- High school: Grapevine (TX)
- College: SMU (2001–2003); Tarleton State (2004–2006)
- NFL draft: 2007: undrafted

Career history

Playing
- Dallas Cowboys (2007–2008)*; Cleveland Browns (2008); Jacksonville Jaguars (2009)*; Washington Redskins (2009); Sacramento Mountain Lions (2010); Arizona Cardinals (2010–2011)
- * Offseason or practice squad member only

Coaching
- Atlanta Legends (2019) (Offensive coordinator)

Career NFL statistics
- Games played: 3
- TD–INT: 1–2
- Passing yards: 236
- Passer rating: 55.1
- Stats at Pro Football Reference

Richard John Bartel (born February 3, 1983) is an American former professional football player who was a quarterback in the National Football League (NFL) for the Arizona Cardinals. He played college football for the Tarleton State Texans. He also played baseball in the Cincinnati Reds minor league organization.

== Early life ==
Bartel attended Grapevine High School, where he lettered in football and baseball. As a junior, he passed for over 1,500 yards and 18 touchdowns.

As a senior in football, he passed for over 2,800 yards and 27 touchdowns, while leading his team to a 7–4 record and a state playoff appearance. He was named the District Offensive Player of the Year, All-Area, All-District 6-4A and All-State Class 4A. He graduated in 2001.

As a senior in baseball, he was an All-District pitcher.

== Baseball career ==
Bartel was selected as a pitcher by the Cincinnati Reds in the 17th round of the 2001 Major League Baseball draft. He pitched for the Gulf Coast League Reds from 2001 to 2003.

== College career ==
Bartel accepted a football scholarship from Southern Methodist University. As a redshirt freshman in 2002, he shared the quarterback position with Tate Wallis, appearing in 7 games, while completing 89-of-148 attempts (60.1%), 1,078 yards, 8 touchdowns and 8 interceptions.

As a sophomore in 2003, he shared the quarterback position with Wallis and Chris Phillips. He completed 68-of-151 attempts (45%), 797 yards, 4 touchdowns and 9 interceptions.

In the fall of 2004, he transferred to Tarleton State University to complete his final two seasons of college eligibility. As a junior, he completed 153-of-253 passes, for a 60.5% (third in school history), 1,883 yards, 12 touchdowns and 11 interceptions.

As a senior, he completed 161-of-276 passes (58.3%), 2,033 yards, 16 touchdowns and 5 interceptions. He averaged 202.3 yards passing per contest. In Tarleton he played in 20 games, completing 314 of 529 passes, a 59.4% (third in school history), 3,906 yards, 128 touchdowns and an average of 195.3 passing yards per contest.

== Professional career ==
=== Dallas Cowboys ===
Bartel was signed as an undrafted free agent following an invite to participate in the Dallas Cowboys' mini-camp after the 2007 NFL draft. On September 1, he was waived and later signed to the practice squad, after rookie quarterback Matt Moore was claimed by the Carolina Panthers.

On August 30, 2008, he was released and later signed to the practice squad, only to be cut on September 8.

=== Cleveland Browns ===
Bartel was signed to the practice squad of the Cleveland Browns on November 26, 2008, after quarterback Brady Quinn was placed on the injured reserve list. Bartel was activated from the practice squad on December 24, 2008, when Ken Dorsey was placed on injured reserve. Bartel was waived by the Browns on September 5, 2009.

=== Jacksonville Jaguars ===
On September 7, 2009, he was signed to the Jacksonville Jaguars' practice squad.

=== Washington Redskins ===
On November 25, 2009, he was signed by the Washington Redskins from the Jaguars' practice squad. The next year, head coach Jim Zorn was replaced with Mike Shanahan and Bartel was cut on September 4, 2010, after being passed on the depth chart by John Beck.

=== Sacramento Mountain Lions ===
On September 14, 2010, he was signed by the Sacramento Mountain Lions of the United Football League.

=== Arizona Cardinals ===
On December 7, 2010, Bartel was signed by the Arizona Cardinals after Max Hall was placed on the injured reserve list. He played in his first regular season NFL game on January 2, 2011, against the host San Francisco 49ers. During that game, he completed his first regular season pass, a 31-yard completion to Larry Fitzgerald late in the third quarter, in relief of starting quarterback John Skelton. He played against the 49ers once again, replacing Skelton, on November 20, 2011, while throwing his first touchdown pass to Larry Fitzgerald.

On September 3, 2012, he was waived with an injury settlement due to a right shoulder injury he suffered in the preseason finale against the Denver Broncos.

== NFL career statistics ==
Year	Team	GP	GS	Passing								Rushing			
Year	Team	GP	GS	Cmp	Att	Pct	Yds	Y/A	TD	Int	Rtg	Att	Yds	Avg	TD
2010	ARI	1	0	16	28	57.1	150	5.4	0	1	57.1	0	0	0.0	0
2011	ARI	2	0	10	22	45.5	86	3.9	1	1	52.5	1	9	9.0	0
Career		3	0	26	50	52.0	236	4.7	1	2	55.1	1	9	9.0	0

== Coaching career ==
On January 29, 2015, after stints at Plano Prestonwood and Argyle Liberty Christian School, he was hired as the football head coach for Southwest Christian High School in Fort Worth. In June 2015, he left to become the football offensive coordinator at IMG Academy. He was named quarterbacks coach for the Atlanta Legends of the Alliance of American Football in January 2019, and became the offensive play-caller after offensive coordinator Michael Vick left the team in February 2019. Bartel resigned on February 22, 2019.
