= Tommie Robinson =

American football player and coach (born 1963)

Current position
- Title: Running backs coach
- Team: UTSA
- Conference: The American

Biographical details
- Born: April 4, 1963 (age 63); Phenix City, Alabama, U.S.

Playing career
- 1982–1986: Troy
- Position: Strong Safety

Coaching career (HC unless noted)
- 1986–1987: Woodham HS (FL) (assistant)
- 1988–1990: Central HS (AL) (assistant)
- 1991: Arkansas (GA)
- 1992–1993: Utah State (RB)
- 1994–1997: TCU (WR)
- 1998–2000: Dallas Cowboys (ST/WR/off. assistant)
- 2001: Oklahoma State (RB)
- 2002: Georgia Tech (WR)
- 2003–2005: Georgia Tech (TE)
- 2006: Memphis (RB)
- 2007–2009: Miami (FL) (RB)
- 2010–2012: Arizona Cardinals (RB)
- 2013: USC (PGC/RB)
- 2014–2015: Texas (RB)
- 2016: USC (RGC/RB)
- 2017–2019: LSU (AHC/RB)
- 2020–2022: Texas A&M (RB)
- 2024: Colorado (Director of quality control)
- 2025–present: UTSA (RB)

Accomplishments and honors

Championships
- as player: NCAA Division II (1984); as Coach: CFP National Champion (2019)

Tommie Robinson (born April 4, 1963) is an American football coach who is the running backs coach at UTSA.

== Playing career ==
Robinson was a three-year starter at strong safety for the Trojans. There he was a player on the 1984 Division II national championship team under Chan Gailey.

== Coaching career ==
=== High school coaching ===
Robinson began his coaching career at the high school level beginning in 1986 as an assistant at Woodham High School in Pensacola, Florida. After two years there he returned to his alma mater Central High School Red Devils in Phenix City, Alabama where he served as an assistant for three years.

=== Coaching in college and the NFL ===
Robinson began coaching on the college level in 1991 as a graduate assistant for the Arkansas Razorbacks. In the 1992 and 1993 season he served as the running backs coach for the Utah State Aggies. From 1994 to 1997, Robinson worked as the wide receivers coach for Texas Christian University. In 1998 Robinson made the jump to coach in the National football League for the Dallas Cowboys under his college head coach Chan Gailey as the teams wide receivers coach and to work with the special teams. Even after Gailey was fired following the 1999 season he was kept on as a part of Dave Campo for the 2000 season. In 2001 Robinson joined the Oklahoma State Cowboys as their running backs coach but only stayed for that one year. The next four years were spent coaching at Georgia Tech. In 2002 he coached the wide receivers and the following three years he served as the team's running backs coach. In 2006 he spent a lone season in Memphis serving as the Tigers’ running backs coach. From 2007 to 2009 Robinson was working as the Hurricanes running backs coach. In 2010 he returned to the NFL this time as a part of the Cardinals organization where he stayed until 2012. In 2013 Robinson was the pass game coordinator and running backs coach for the USC Trojans team that went through three head coaches in the season. From 2014 to 2015 Robinson served as the Texas Longhorns running backs coach. In 2016 Robinson returned to USC as the team's run game coordinator and running backs coach. In 2017 Robinson joined the LSU Tigers under Ed Orgeron (who he coached under at USC) where he served as recruiting coordinator, assistant head coach, and running backs coach. He stayed there until the end of the 2019 college football playoffs championship. In 2020 he joined Texas A&M under coach Jimbo Fisher as the team's running backs coach. He was released following the 2022 season.

== Personal life ==
Robinson and his wife, Lartonyar, have three children.
