= John Skelton (American football) =

American football player (born 1988)

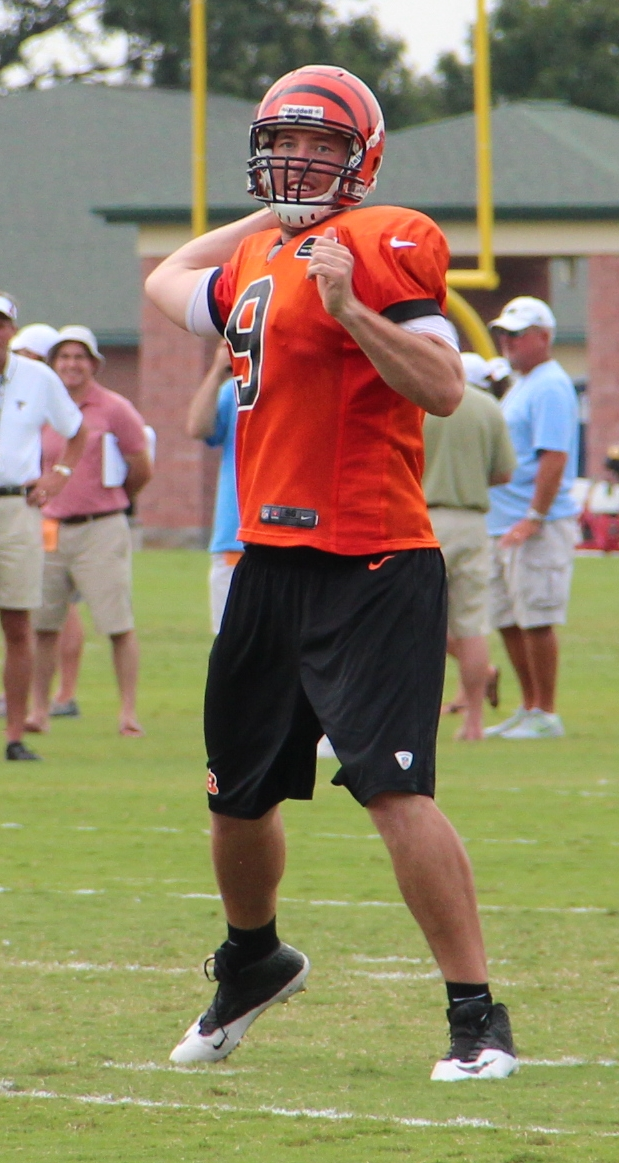
- Skelton with the Cincinnati Bengals in 2013

No. 19
- Position: Quarterback

Personal information
- Born: March 17, 1988 (age 38); El Paso, Texas, U.S.
- Listed height: 6 ft 6 in (1.98 m)
- Listed weight: 250 lb (113 kg)

Career information
- High school: Burges (El Paso)
- College: Fordham (2006–2009)
- NFL draft: 2010: 5th round, 155th overall pick

Career history
- Arizona Cardinals (2010–2012); Cincinnati Bengals (2013)*; San Francisco 49ers (2013); Tennessee Titans (2013); Montreal Alouettes (2015)*
- * Offseason or practice squad member only

Awards and highlights
- Second-team All-Patriot League (2007)

Career NFL statistics
- Passing attempts: 602
- Passing completions: 320
- Completion percentage: 53.2%
- TD–INT: 15–25
- Passing yards: 3,707
- Passer rating: 63
- Stats at Pro Football Reference

John Michael Skelton (born March 17, 1988) is an American former professional football player who was a quarterback in the National Football League (NFL). He played college football for the Fordham Rams and was selected by the Arizona Cardinals in the fifth round of the 2010 NFL draft.

He was also a member of the Cincinnati Bengals, San Francisco 49ers, and Tennessee Titans, and also had a brief stint with the Montreal Alouettes of the Canadian Football League (CFL).

== Early life ==
Skelton attended Burges High School in El Paso, where his father served as an assistant coach. He lettered in football, basketball, baseball, and track. After passing for 2,172 yards and 15 touchdowns as a senior in football, he earned first-team All-District I Class-AAAA and All-City honors, and was named the Offensive MVP by the El Paso Times in 2005. He finished his football career as the starting quarterback in the 2006 El Paso All-Star Game.

In basketball, Skelton earned All-City, All-District and All-Region honors. Changing positions every year in baseball, he earned All-District honors all four years and All-City honors in 2006.

== College career ==
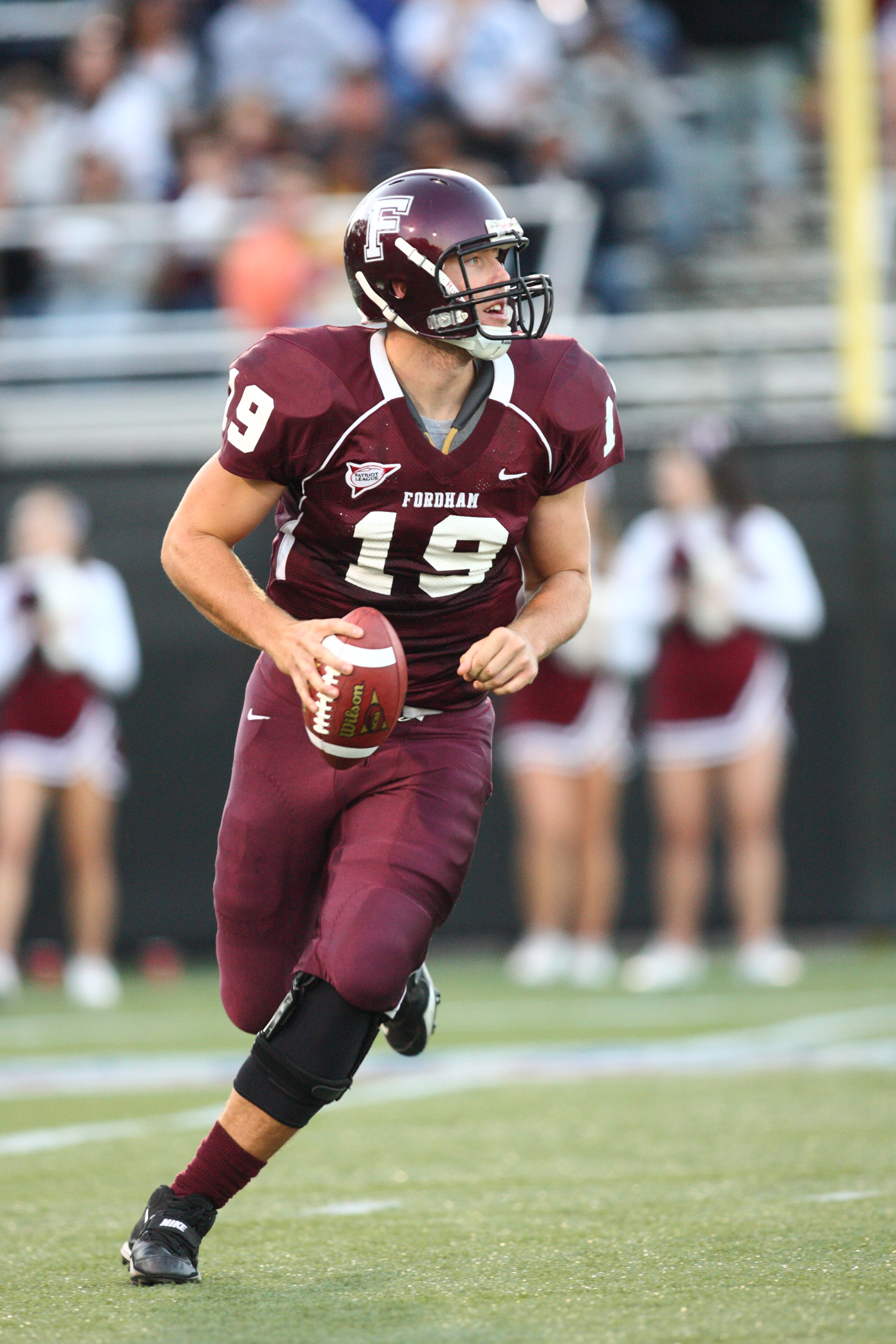
Skelton with the Fordham Rams in 2009

In 2006, midway through his freshman year with the Rams at Fordham University, Skelton won the starting quarterback position and started every game for the rest of his college career. He received Patriot League rookie player of the week honors in that season.

Skelton had a solid first full year as the starting quarterback in 2007, being named 2007 Second-team All-Patriot League in a season in which he threw for 22 touchdowns (the third best single season total in Fordham history). He threw for over 200 yards in seven games in 2007 and for over 300 yards in two games and ranked second in the Patriot League in passing yards per game and total offense. He led the Fordham Rams to a Patriot League championship, earning them a trip to the NCAA FCS playoffs. In the playoff game against the University of Massachusetts, Skelton set a Patriot League playoff record for touchdowns responsible for at five(5), throwing for 3 and running for 2.

In 2008, Fordham struggled to a 5–6 record, missing the playoffs. However, Skelton put up good numbers for the Fordham Rams with 2,650 yards, and 15 touchdowns with 7 interceptions, finishing the season ranked second in the Patriot League in passing average (236.8 yards/game) and total offense (244.5).

Skelton's senior year, the 2009 season, was a record-shattering one, with new school records for completions and passing yards. He led the NCAA FCS in passing yards/game (337.09) and total passing yards (3,708), ranked second in total offense (348.18/yards/game), and ranked third in completions per game (25.82).

Out of the 11 scheduled games, Skelton threw for over 300 yards eight times, 4 times exceeding 400 yards. During his four-year career at Fordham, he completed 802 passes for 9,923 yards and 69 touchdowns, all school records.

In recognition of his accomplishments and strong interest from NFL scouts and teams, Skelton played in the prestigious East-West Shrine Game on January 23, 2010, at the Florida Citrus Bowl in Orlando and participated in the NFL Scouting Combine in February.

== Professional career ==
Pre-draft measurables
Height	Weight	Arm length	Hand span	40-yard dash	10-yard split	20-yard split	20-yard shuttle	Three-cone drill	Vertical jump	Broad jump	Wonderlic
6 ft 5 3/8 in (1.97 m)	243 lb (110 kg)	32 in (0.81 m)	9 3/4 in (0.25 m)	4.85 s	1.61 s	2.78 s	4.33 s	7.17 s	33.5 in (0.85 m)	9 ft 0 in (2.74 m)	24
All values from 2010 NFL Scouting Combine

=== Arizona Cardinals ===
==== 2010 season ====
Skelton was selected by the Arizona Cardinals in the fifth round of the 2010 NFL draft. He was signed on July 14. After Matt Leinart was released, he was named the third-string quarterback for the Cardinals.

Skelton's first NFL game experience was a 2010 preseason game against the Houston Texans where he led the Cardinals to two touchdown drives in two possessions as Arizona rallied for a victory. He completed five passes out of six attempts for 84 yards and achieved a perfect passer rating of 158.3.

Skelton entered in the fourth quarter of a game against the St. Louis Rams to make his NFL debut, and he completed three of his six passes for 45 yards with a passer rating of 75.0. The Cardinals still failed to win, losing to the Rams 19–6. Skelton was named the starting quarterback thereafter.

In his first career NFL start, Skelton led the Cardinals to a 43–13 victory over the Denver Broncos, snapping a seven-game losing streak for the Cardinals. He completed 15 of his 37 passes with 146 passing yards. He was nominated for Rookie of the Week after this game, but Rob Gronkowski of the New England Patriots wound up winning the award. In Skelton's third NFL start, on Christmas Day, he led the game-winning drive, bringing the Cardinals in field goal range where Jay Feely was able to kick the game winning field goal. The Cardinals won 27–26 against the Dallas Cowboys.

Skelton would lose the last game of the season against the San Francisco 49ers for the Cardinals throwing both a touchdown pass and an interception. He would finish his rookie season with two touchdown passes and two interceptions, a total of 662 passing yards, and a QB rating of 62.3.

==== 2011 season ====
In 2011, Skelton stepped into the starting quarterback position for an injured Kevin Kolb. He helped end the Cardinals' six-game losing streak in his first game as starter against the St. Louis Rams in week 9, winning 19–13. For the rest of 2011 he threw for 1,913 yards, 11 touchdowns, and 14 interceptions with a quarterback rating of 68.9. Skelton started seven games in total and the team had a 5–2 record during his starts.

==== 2012 season ====
On August 31, 2012, Skelton was named the starting quarterback for the Cardinals for game one against the Seattle Seahawks on September 9. Shortly after, Skelton lost his job due to an ankle injury in week 1. He started four games following Kolb's injury before being benched in favor of 6th round rookie Ryan Lindley. Skelton started one more game due to poor play from Lindley only before being benched for the season after a four interception performance in a rematch against the Seahawks on week 14. On April 1, 2013, Skelton was released.

=== Cincinnati Bengals ===
On April 3, 2013, the Cincinnati Bengals claimed Skelton off waivers. Skelton was waived by the Bengals on August 31, 2013.

=== San Francisco 49ers ===
On October 2, 2013, Skelton was signed by the San Francisco 49ers. He was waived on October 9 after the 49ers acquired McLeod Bethel-Thompson.

=== Tennessee Titans ===
On November 18, 2013, Skelton was signed by the Tennessee Titans. Skelton was waived by the Titans on December 17, 2013.

=== Montreal Alouettes ===
On February 6, 2015, Skelton was signed by the Montreal Alouettes of the Canadian Football League. He was released in May 2015. The Montreal Gazette reported that "Three days of rookie training camp undoubtedly taught the Alouettes some things – namely, quarterback John Skelton couldn’t make the transition to Canadian Football League play."

== Career statistics ==
=== NFL ===
Year	Team	Games			Passing								Rushing				Sacks		Fumbles	
Year	Team	GP	GS	Record	Cmp	Att	Pct	Yds	Y/A	TD	Int	Rate	Att	Yds	Avg	TD	Sck	Yds	Fum	Lost
2010	ARI	5	4	2–2	60	126	47.6	662	5.3	2	2	62.3	10	49	4.9	0	9	65	3	1
2011	ARI	8	7	5–2	151	275	54.9	1,913	7.0	11	14	68.9	28	128	4.6	0	23	162	4	1
2012	ARI	6	6	1–5	109	201	54.2	1,132	5.6	2	9	55.4	4	5	1.3	0	15	98	4	2
Career		19	17	8–9	320	602	53.2	3,707	6.2	15	25	63.0	42	182	4.3	0	47	325	11	4

=== College ===
		Passing								Rushing		
Season	Team	GP	Cmp	Att	Pct	Yds	TD	Int	Rtg	Att	Yds	TD
2006	Fordham	9	74	167	44.3	960	6	8	94.9	56	204	1
2007	Fordham	12	216	383	56.4	2,650	22	11	127.7	96	453	6
2008	Fordham	11	228	372	61.3	2,605	15	7	129.7	58	213	2
2009	Fordham	11	284	441	64.4	3,713	26	10	150.1	86	346	5
Totals		43	802	1,363	58.8	9,923	69	36	131.4	296	1,216	14

== Career highlights ==
=== Awards and honors ===
College

- 2006 Patriot League Rookie of the Week
- 2007 Patriot League Offensive Player of the Week
- 2007 Patriot League Offensive Player of the Week
- 2007 Second-team All-Patriot League selection
- 2008 Preseason All American by Consensus Draft Services
- 2009 Patriot League Offensive Player of the Week
- 2009 Preseason All American by Consensus Draft Services
- 2009 College Sporting News National All-Star
- 2009 Patriot League Offensive Player of the Week
- 2009 ECAC Offensive Player of the Week
- 2009 NCAA Championship Subdivision (FCS) National Leader in Passing Yards Per Game
- 2009 NCAA Championship Subdivision (FCS) National Leader in Total Passing Yards
- 2009 Invited to play in the 4th annual Texas vs. The Nation Game
- 2009 Played in the East-West Shrine Game- January 23, 2010
- 2009 Accepted invitation to the NFL Scouting Combine

=== Records ===
Fordham University school career records:

- Total offense: 10,488
- Touchdown passes: 69
- Passing yards: 9,928
- Pass completions: 802
- Pass attempts: 1363
- Combined touchdowns: 83

== Personal life ==
His brother Steve Skelton played tight end for Fordham and practiced with the Arizona Cardinals and Houston Texans but was cut before the regular season and never played in a professional game.

In November 2021, John Skelton qualified for the March 2022 Tempe, Arizona city council race.
