= Ron Aiken =

American football player and coach (born 1955)

Biographical details
- Born: August 18, 1955 (age 71); Moncks Corner, South Carolina, U.S.
- Education: North Carolina A&T – B.A. The Citadel – M.Ed

Playing career
- 1974–1977: North Carolina A&T
- Position: Defensive lineman

Coaching career (HC unless noted)
- 1977−1978: Boiling Springs HS (SC) (OL)
- 1979: Greensville County HS (VA)
- 1980−1981: Bethany (KS) (OL)
- 1982−1984: Tarkio (OC)
- 1985: RPI (ST)
- 1986−1989: Langston
- 1990−1994: New Mexico (LB/DE)
- 1995−1996: Vanderbilt (DL)
- 1997: Texas (DT)
- 1998: San Diego State (LB)
- 1999−2006: Iowa (DL)
- 2007−2012: Arizona Cardinals (DL)
- 2013−2016: Oregon (DL)
- 2019: Arizona Hotshots (DL)

Head coaching record
- Overall: 8–29 (college)

Accomplishments and honors

Awards
- AFCA Division I FBS Assistant Coach of the Year Award (2002)

Ron Aiken (born August 18, 1955) is an American football coach. He was recently the defensive line coach for the Arizona Hotshots of the Alliance of American Football. He was the defensive line coach at the University of Oregon from 2013 to 2016.

== Education and playing career ==
Aiken was a starting offensive lineman for North Carolina A&T from 1974 to 1977. He earned a Bachelor's degree in history from North Carolina A&T in 1977. Aiken proceeded to earn his master's degree in secondary education from The Citadel in 1982.

== Coaching career ==
Aiken won the AFCA Division I FBS Assistant Coach of the Year Award in 2002.

== Head coaching record ==
=== College ===
Year	Team	Overall	Conference	Standing
Langston Lions (NAIA Division I independent) (1986–1989)
1986	Langston	2–7		
1987	Langston	0–10		
1988	Langston	2–7		
1989	Langston	4–5		
Langston:		8–29		
Total:		8–29		
