= Michael Adams (American football) =

American football player (born 1985)

No. 21, 27
- Position: Cornerback

Personal information
- Born: June 17, 1985 (age 41); Dallas, Texas, U.S.
- Listed height: 5 ft 8 in (1.73 m)
- Listed weight: 178 lb (81 kg)

Career information
- High school: Justin F. Kimball (Dallas)
- College: Louisiana
- NFL draft: 2007: undrafted

Career history
- Arizona Cardinals (2007–2012); Tampa Bay Buccaneers (2013)

Career NFL statistics
- Total tackles: 177
- Sacks: 1
- Forced fumbles: 1
- Fumble recoveries: 4
- Interceptions: 3
- Defensive touchdowns: 1
- Stats at Pro Football Reference

Michael Wayne Adams Jr. (born June 17, 1985) is an American former professional football player who was a cornerback in the National Football League (NFL). He played college football for the Louisiana–Lafayette Ragin' Cajuns and was signed by the Arizona Cardinals as an undrafted free agent in 2007.

On June 19, 2013, Adams signed a one-year contract with the Tampa Bay Buccaneers.

Pre-draft measurables
| Height | Weight |
|---|---|
| 5 ft 8 1/4 in (1.73 m) | 176 lb (80 kg) |
Values from Pro Day
