= Alfonso Smith =

American football player (born 1987)

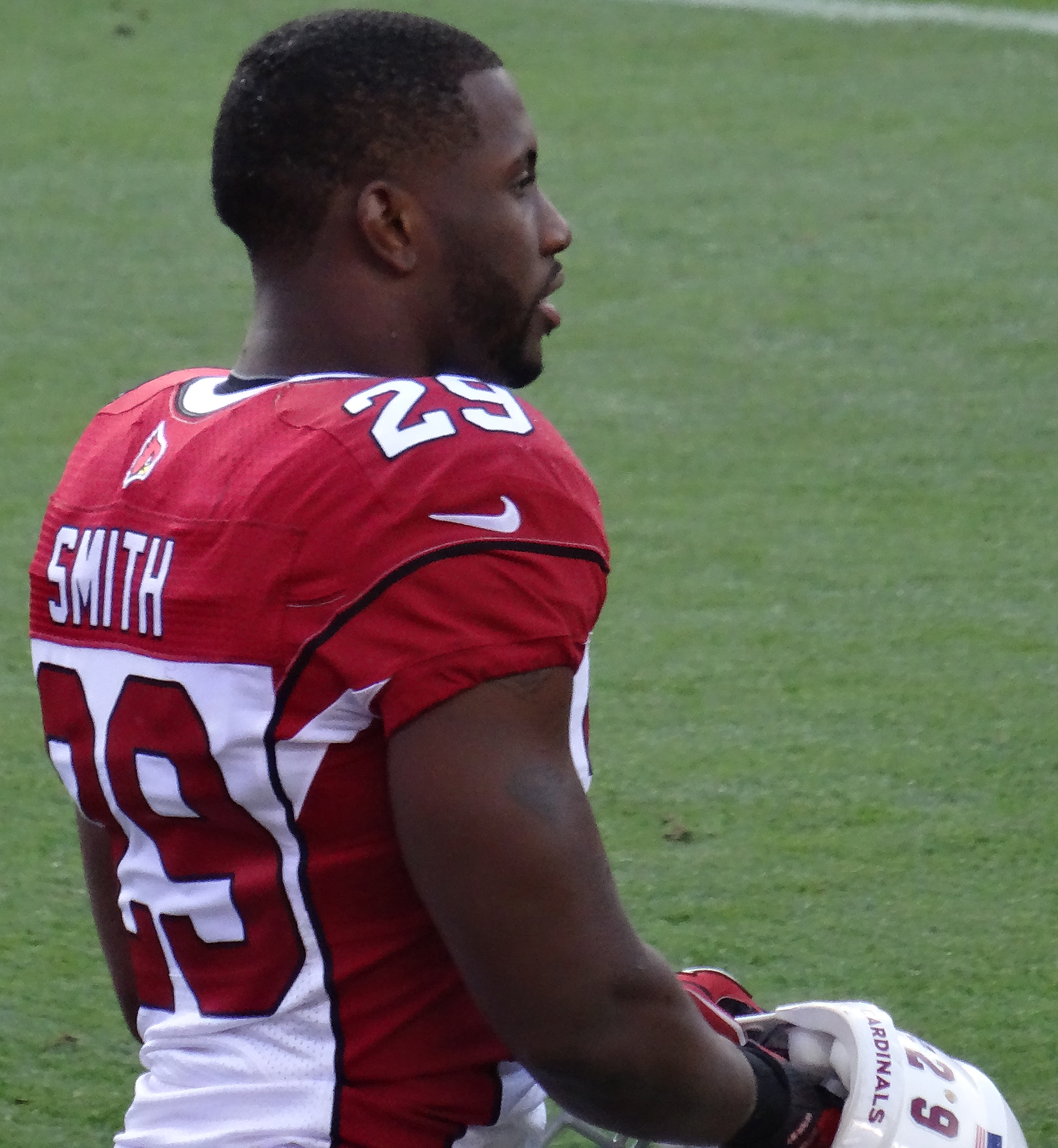
- Smith with the Arizona Cardinals in 2013

No. 46, 29, 38
- Position: Running back

Personal information
- Born: January 23, 1987 (age 39); San Bernardino, California, U.S.
- Listed height: 6 ft 1 in (1.85 m)
- Listed weight: 209 lb (95 kg)

Career information
- High school: Waggener (Louisville, Kentucky)
- College: Kentucky
- NFL draft: 2010: undrafted

Career history
- Arizona Cardinals (2010−2013); San Francisco 49ers (2014)

Career NFL statistics
- Rushing attempts: 55
- Rushing yards: 175
- Rushing touchdowns: 2
- Receptions: 18
- Receiving yards: 121
- Stats at Pro Football Reference

Alfonso Smith (born January 23, 1987) is an American former professional football player who was a running back in the National Football League (NFL). He played college football for the Kentucky Wildcats and was signed by the Arizona Cardinals as an undrafted free agent in 2010. He was also a member of the San Francisco 49ers.

== Early life ==
Smith was born January 23, 1987 in San Bernardino, California. He attended Waggener High School in Louisville, Kentucky.

== College career ==
Smith played college football for the Kentucky Wildcats from 2005 to 2009, redshirting his freshman year. He played in a reserve role from 2006 to 2008 until he earned a place in the starting lineup in his fifth-year senior season. His college career was marked by a series of minor but recurring injuries. A thumb injury limited his play time during his senior season. Smith played in 49 games at Kentucky, rushing 215 times for 974 yards and eight touchdowns. He added 30 receptions for 322 yards and two touchdowns, 15 kick returns for 155 yards, as well as 28 tackles, one forced fumble, and one fumble recovery on special teams.

== Professional career ==
=== Arizona Cardinals ===
After going unselected in the 2010 NFL draft, Smith signed with the Arizona Cardinals as an undrafted free agent. Smith played in 43 games over four seasons with the Cardinals, rushing 48 times for 156 yards and two touchdowns.

=== San Francisco 49ers ===
On July 28, 2014, the San Francisco 49ers agreed to terms with Smith. He rushed seven times for 19 yards in six games in his single season with the team.

== Coaching career ==
On June 21, 2017, Smith joined the staff of the Michigan Wolverines as an assistant running backs coach.

In 2019, Smith returned to his alma mater, Waggener High School, as an assistant coach of the school's football team. He worked under head coach Tye Lawson, his former teammate at Kentucky.
