= Marshay Green =

American gridiron football player (born 1986)

No. 30
- Position: Defensive back

Personal information
- Born: January 14, 1986 (age 40); Bastrop, Louisiana, U.S.
- Listed height: 5 ft 10 in (1.78 m)
- Listed weight: 175 lb (79 kg)

Career information
- High school: Bastrop (LA)
- College: Mississippi
- NFL draft: 2010: undrafted

Career history
- Arizona Cardinals (2010–2011); Indianapolis Colts (2012–2013); Saskatchewan Roughriders (2014–2015)

Career NFL statistics
- Total tackles: 4
- Stats at Pro Football Reference
- Stats at CFL.ca (archive)

Marcus "Marshay" Kentrill Green (born January 14, 1986) is a former gridiron football defensive back. He was signed by the Arizona Cardinals as an undrafted free agent in 2010, spending two seasons with the club before joining the Indianapolis Colts for another two seasons. He played college football at Ole Miss. Green was the 2009 Defensive MVP in the nationally televised Cotton Bowl. Green signed with the Saskatchewan Roughriders on May 20, 2014.
