= 2008 Arizona Cardinals season =

NFL team season; first Super Bowl appearance

- Owner: Bill Bidwill
- General manager: Rod Graves
- Head coach: Ken Whisenhunt
- Offensive coordinator: Todd Haley
- Defensive coordinator: Clancy Pendergast
- Home stadium: University of Phoenix Stadium

Results
- Record: 9–7
- Division place: 1st NFC West
- Playoffs: Won Wild Card Playoffs (vs. Falcons) 30–24; Won Divisional Playoffs (at Panthers) 33–13; Won NFC Championship (vs. Eagles) 32–25; Lost Super Bowl XLIII (vs. Steelers) 23–27
- All-Pros: WR Larry Fitzgerald (1st team); SS Adrian Wilson (2nd team)
- Pro Bowlers: WR Larry Fitzgerald; SS Adrian Wilson; WR Sean Morey; QB Kurt Warner; WR Anquan Boldin

Uniform
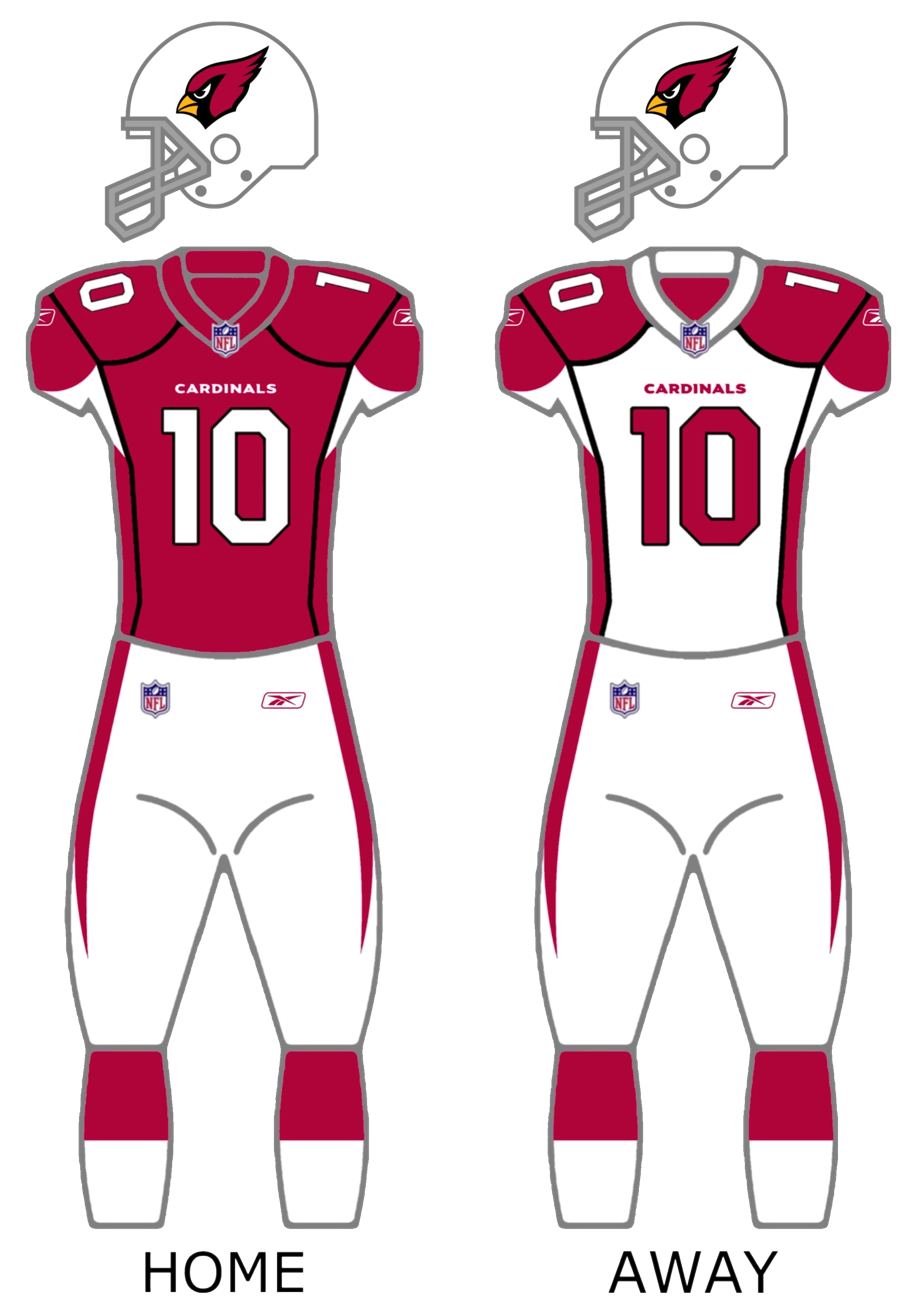

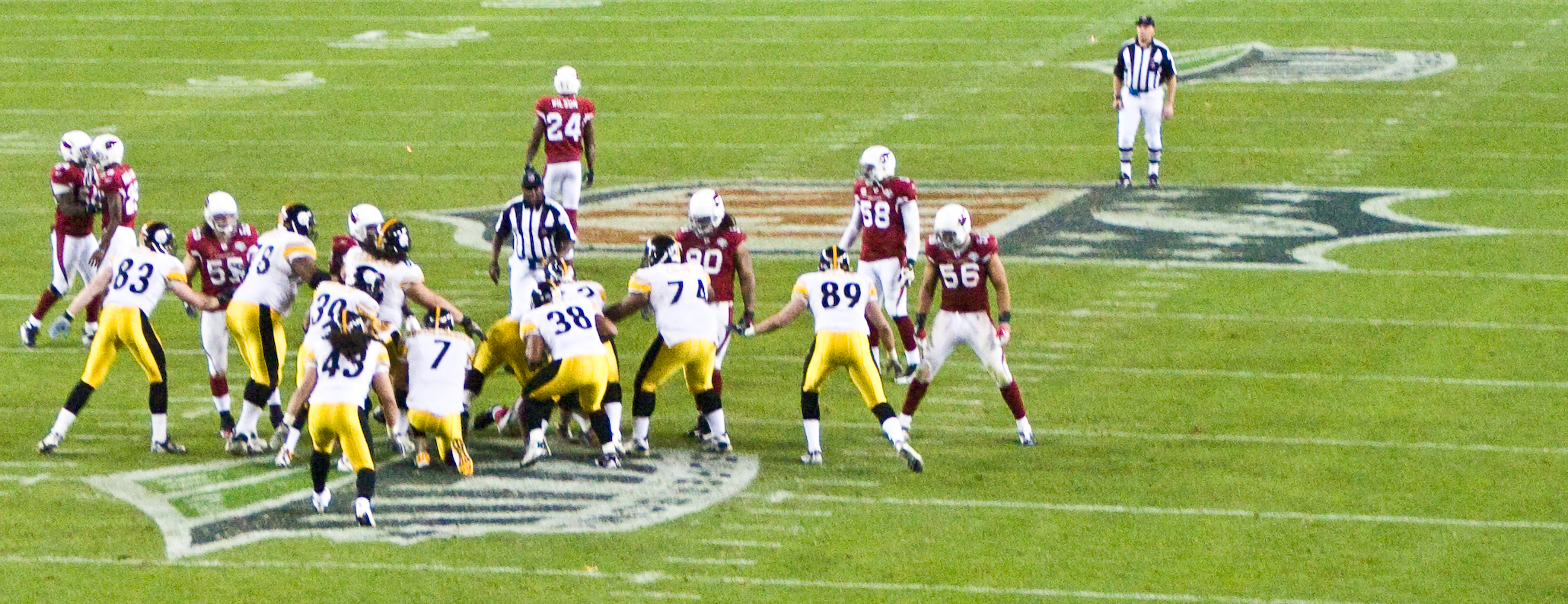
The Cardinals playing against the Pittsburgh Steelers in the Super Bowl

The 2008 season was the Arizona Cardinals' 89th in the National Football League (NFL), their 21st season in Arizona, and their second under head coach Ken Whisenhunt. The season marked the Cardinals' first, and so far, only Super Bowl appearance, coming as a result of their victory against the Philadelphia Eagles in the NFC Championship. The Cardinals slogan for the season was "Shock The World!" Benefiting from franchise quarterback Kurt Warner, who had gone from being a backup for the St. Louis Rams in 1999, to leading the Greatest Show on Turf to a Super Bowl XXXIV victory, franchise strong safety Adrian Wilson, and franchise wide receivers Larry Fitzgerald and Anquan Boldin, the Cardinals performed extremely well in the playoffs. Despite having won just one playoff game in the last sixty years, Warner once again led the team to their first winning record in 10 years, and the first franchise Super Bowl ever.

The Cardinals began their season by compiling a 7–3 record by Week 11. Although they went 2–4 the rest of the way, Arizona still finished with a 9–7 record (their first winning season in 10 years), which was good enough to win the NFC West. The Cardinals also swept their division for the first time in franchise history, and for the first time since 1947, hosted a playoff game. In that wild card game, the Cardinals defeated the Atlanta Falcons. The next week, for the Divisional round of the playoffs, the Cardinals traveled to Charlotte, North Carolina, where they upset the number 2 seeded Carolina Panthers. Then, because the Philadelphia Eagles also achieved an upset the same week (against the top-seeded New York Giants), the number-four seed Cardinals hosted the NFC Championship game, where they defeated the Eagles and qualified for the Super Bowl for the first time in franchise history. In Super Bowl XLIII, the Cardinals' winning streak ended. Though they led the Pittsburgh Steelers with less than a minute left to play in the game, they lost, 27–23.

The 2008 Cardinals were the second 9–7 team to reach the Super Bowl, joining the Los Angeles Rams in Super Bowl XIV, who also lost to the Steelers; however, the Rams had to win only two playoff games, rather than three, to reach the Super Bowl. Three years later in Super Bowl XLVI, the New York Giants would become the first 9–7 team to win, overshadowing the Cardinals' achievement. In 2014, Athlon Sports ranked the 2008 Cardinals as the fourth-worst team to ever make the Super Bowl.

== Coaching staff ==
2008 Arizona Cardinals staff
Front office: Owner/Chairman – Bill Bidwill; President – Michael Bidwill; Vice-president – Bill Bidwill, Jr.; General Manager/Vice President of football operations – Rod Graves; Personnel Executive – Jason Licht; Director of football administration – Reggie Terry; Director of player personnel – Steve Keim; Head coaches: Head Coach – Ken Whisenhunt; Assistant head coach/offensive line – Russ Grimm; Offensive coaches: Offensive Coordinator – Todd Haley; Quarterbacks – Jeff Rutledge; Running backs – Maurice Carthon; Wide receivers – Mike Miller; Tight Ends – Freddie Kitchens; Offensive quality control – Dedric Ward	Defensive coaches: Defensive Coordinator – Clancy Pendergast; Defensive Line – Ron Aiken; Linebackers – Billy Davis; Defensive Backs – Teryl Austin; Assistant Defensive Backs – Rick Courtright; Defensive assistant – Matt Raich; Special teams coaches: Special Teams – Kevin Spencer; Strength and conditioning: Strength and Conditioning – John Lott; Strength and Conditioning Assistant – Pete Alosi; → Coaching Staff → Management → More NFL staffs

== 2008 NFL Draft selections ==
Round	Pick	Player name	Position	College
1	16	Dominique Rodgers-Cromartie	Cornerback	Tennessee State University
2	50	Calais Campbell	Defensive end	University of Miami
3	81	Early Doucet	Wide receiver	Louisiana State University
4	116	Kenny Iwebema	Defensive end	University of Iowa
5	149	Tim Hightower	Running back	University of Richmond
6	185	Chris Harrington	Defensive end	Texas A&M University
7	225	Brandon Keith	Offensive tackle	University of Northern Iowa

== Roster ==
Arizona Cardinals 2008 final roster
Quarterbacks: 7 Matt Leinart; 2 Brian St. Pierre; 13 Kurt Warner; Running backs: 28 J.J. Arrington KR; 46 Tim Castille; 34 Tim Hightower; 32 Edgerrin James; 45 Terrelle Smith FB; Wide receivers: 81 Anquan Boldin; 15 Steve Breaston RS; 80 Early Doucet; 11 Larry Fitzgerald; 87 Sean Morey ST; 85 Jerheme Urban; Tight ends: 89 Ben Patrick; 82 Leonard Pope; 83 Stephen Spach	Offensive linemen: 61 Elton Brown G; 75 Levi Brown T; 69 Mike Gandy T; 72 Brandon Keith G/T; 76 Deuce Lutui G; 70 Pat Ross C/G; 63 Lyle Sendlein C; 68 Elliot Vallejo T; 74 Reggie Wells G; Defensive linemen: 92 Bertrand Berry DE; 78 Alan Branch DT; 93 Calais Campbell DE/DT; 90 Darnell Dockett DT; 91 Kenny Iwebema DE; 55 Travis LaBoy DE; 97 Bryan Robinson DT; 94 Antonio Smith DE; 98 Gabe Watson DT	Linebackers: 52 Monty Beisel MLB; 58 Karlos Dansby OLB; 54 Gerald Hayes MLB; 57 Victor Hobson OLB; 56 Chike Okeafor OLB; 51 Pago Togafau OLB; Defensive backs: 27 Michael Adams CB; 20 Ralph Brown CB; 47 Aaron Francisco SS; 25 Eric Green CB; 26 Roderick Hood CB; 29 Dominique Rodgers-Cromartie CB; 21 Antrel Rolle FS; 22 Matt Ware FS; 24 Adrian Wilson SS; Special teams: 5 Ben Graham P; 48 Nathan Hodel LS; 1 Neil Rackers K	Reserve lists: 53 Clark Haggans LB (IR); 95 Ali Highsmith LB (IR); 64 Scott Peters C/G (IR); Practice squad: 43 Eduardo Castañeda LB ^{Int'l}; 73 Keilen Dykes DE; 23 Wilrey Fontenot CB; 86 Onrea Jones WR; 38 Dennis Keyes FS; 19 Lance Long WR; 60 Enoka Lucas C/G; 59 Kelly Poppinga LB; 49 Alex Shor TE; rookies in italics 53 active, 3 inactive, 9 practice squad

== Schedule ==
=== Preseason ===
Week	Date	Opponent	Result	Record	Venue	Recap
1	August 7	New Orleans Saints	**L** 10–24	0–1	University of Phoenix Stadium	Recap
2	August 16	at Kansas City Chiefs	**W** 27–17	1–1	Arrowhead Stadium	Recap
3	August 23	at Oakland Raiders	**W** 24–0	2–1	McAfee Coliseum	Recap
4	August 29	Denver Broncos	**L** 14–28	2–2	University of Phoenix Stadium	Recap

=== Regular season ===
Week	Date	Opponent	Result	Record	Venue	Recap
1	September 7	at **San Francisco 49ers**	**W** 23–13	1–0	Candlestick Park	Recap
2	September 14	Miami Dolphins	**W** 31–10	2–0	University of Phoenix Stadium	Recap
3	September 21	at Washington Redskins	**L** 17–24	2–1	FedExField	Recap
4	September 28	at New York Jets	**L** 35–56	2–2	Giants Stadium	Recap
5	October 5	Buffalo Bills	**W** 41–17	3–2	University of Phoenix Stadium	Recap
6	October 12	Dallas Cowboys	**W** 30–24 (OT)	4–2	University of Phoenix Stadium	Recap
7	Bye					
8	October 26	at Carolina Panthers	**L** 23–27	4–3	Bank of America Stadium	Recap
9	November 2	at **St. Louis Rams**	**W** 34–13	5–3	Edward Jones Dome	Recap
10	November 10	**San Francisco 49ers**	**W** 29–24	6–3	University of Phoenix Stadium	Recap
11	November 16	at **Seattle Seahawks**	**W** 26–20	7–3	Qwest Field	Recap
12	November 23	New York Giants	**L** 29–37	7–4	University of Phoenix Stadium	Recap
13	November 27	at Philadelphia Eagles	**L** 20–48	7–5	Lincoln Financial Field	Recap
14	December 7	**St. Louis Rams**	**W** 34–10	8–5	University of Phoenix Stadium	Recap
15	December 14	Minnesota Vikings	**L** 14–35	8–6	University of Phoenix Stadium	Recap
16	December 21	at New England Patriots	**L** 7–47	8–7	Gillette Stadium	Recap
17	December 28	**Seattle Seahawks**	**W** 34–21	9–7	University of Phoenix Stadium	Recap
Note: Intra-division opponents are in **bold** text.

== Standings ==
NFC West
	W	L	T	PCT	DIV	CONF	PF	PA	STK
^{(4)} Arizona Cardinals	9	7	0	.563	6–0	7–5	427	426	W1
San Francisco 49ers	7	9	0	.438	3–3	5–7	339	381	W2
Seattle Seahawks	4	12	0	.250	3–3	3–9	294	392	L1
St. Louis Rams	2	14	0	.125	0–6	2–10	232	465	L10

== Regular season results ==
=== Week 1: at San Francisco 49ers ===
Week 1: Arizona Cardinals at San Francisco 49ers – Game summary

Quarter	1	2	3	4	Total
Cardinals	3	7	10	3	23
49ers	7	3	0	3	13

at Candlestick Park, San Francisco, California

- Date: September 7
- Game time: 1:15 p.m. MST and PST
- Game weather: Sunny, 64 °F (18 °C)
- Game attendance: 67,186
- Referee: Gene Steratore
- TV announcers (Fox): Sam Rosen, Tim Ryan, and Chris Myers
- Box Score

Game information

First quarter

- ARI – Neil Rackers 25-yard field goal, 11:06. Cardinals 3–0. Drive: 13 plays, 53 yards, 7:12.
- SF – Frank Gore 41-yard run (Joe Nedney kick), 6:00. 49ers 7–3. Drive: 7 plays, 33 yards, 2:35.

Second quarter

- ARI – Larry Fitzgerald 1-yard pass from Kurt Warner (Neil Rackers kick), 10:25. Cardinals 10–7. Drive: 6 plays, 58 yards, 2:50.
- SF – Joe Nedney 39-yard field goal, 1:52. Tied 10–10. Drive: 9 plays, 69 yards, 4:19.

Third quarter

- ARI – Neil Rackers 31-yard field goal, 8:25. Cardinals 13–10. Drive: 15 plays, 65 yards, 6:35.
- ARI – Tim Hightower 2-yard run (Neil Rackers kick), 4:03. Cardinals 20–10. Drive: 8 plays, 33 yards, 4:22.

Fourth quarter

- SF – Joe Nedney 30-yard field goal, 12:05. Cardinals 20–13. Drive: 13 plays, 60 yards, 6:58.
- ARI – Neil Rackers 30-yard field goal, 1:57. Cardinals 23–13. Drive: 18 plays, 62 yards, 10:08.

Top passers

- ARI – Kurt Warner – 19/30, 197 yards, TD
- SF – J. T. O'Sullivan – 14/20, 195 yards, INT

Top rushers

- ARI – Edgerrin James – 26 rushes, 100 yards
- SF – Frank Gore – 14 rushes, 96 yards, TD

Top receivers

- ARI – Anquan Boldin – 8 receptions, 82 yards
- SF – Frank Gore – 4 receptions, 55 yards

The Cardinals began their 2008 campaign on the road against their NFC West rival, the San Francisco 49ers. In the first quarter, Arizona took a lead, as kicker Neil Rackers converted a 25-yard field goal. The 49ers responded with Running back Frank Gore's 41-yard Touchdown run. In the second quarter, the Cardinals responded with Quarterback Kurt Warner completing a one-yard Touchdown pass to Receiver Larry Fitzgerald. San Francisco tied the game with kicker Joe Nedney's 39-yard field goal. In the third quarter, the Cardinals took back the lead, as Rackers kicked a 31-yard field goal, along with rookie Running Back Tim Hightower scoring a touchdown on a two-yard rush. In the fourth quarter, the 49ers tried to respond, with Nedney kicking a 30-yard field goal. Rackers' 30-yard field goal ultimately sealed the victory for Arizona.

With the win, the Cardinals began their season at 1–0.

=== Week 2: vs. Miami Dolphins ===
Week 2: Miami Dolphins at Arizona Cardinals – Game summary

Quarter	1	2	3	4	Total
Dolphins	0	0	3	7	10
Cardinals	14	3	14	0	31

at University of Phoenix Stadium, Glendale, Arizona

- Date: September 14
- Game time: 1:15 p.m. MST
- Game weather: None (retractable roof closed)
- Game attendance: 63,445
- Referee: Carl Cheffers
- TV announcers (CBS): Bill Macatee and Steve Beuerlein
- Box Score

Game information

First quarter

- ARI – Anquan Boldin 79-yard pass from Kurt Warner (Neil Rackers kick), 12:20. Cardinals 7–0. Drive: 1 play, 69 yards, 0:29.
- ARI – Anquan Boldin 3-yard pass from Kurt Warner (Neil Rackers kick), 5:40. Cardinals 14–0. Drive: 8 plays, 92 yards, 4:19.

Second quarter

- ARI – Neil Rackers 45-yard field goal, 8:46. Cardinals 17–0. Drive: 11 plays, 60 yards, 6:42.

Third quarter

- ARI – Tim Hightower 1-yard run (Neil Rackers kick), 10:29. Cardinals 24–0. Drive: 10 plays, 71 yards, 4:31.
- MIA – Dan Carpenter 32-yard field goal, 5:26. Cardinals 24–3. Drive: 11 plays, 58 yards, 5:03.
- ARI – Anquan Boldin 8-yard pass from Kurt Warner (Neil Rackers kick), 1:27. Cardinals 31–3. Drive: 8 plays, 80 yards, 3:59.

Fourth quarter

- MIA – Ronnie Brown 1-yard run (Neil Rackers kick), 2:38. Cardinals 31–10. Drive: 18 plays, 89 yards, 7:04.

Top passers

- MIA – Chad Pennington – 10/20, 112 yards
- ARI – Kurt Warner – 19/24, 361 yards, 3 TD

Top rushers

- MIA – Ricky Williams – 11 rushes, 28 yards
- ARI – Edgerrin James – 18 rushes, 55 yards

Top receivers

- MIA – Derek Hagan – 3 receptions, 51 yards
- ARI – Larry Fitzgerald – 6 receptions, 153 yards

Coming off their divisional road win over the 49ers, the Cardinals played their Week 2 home opener against the Miami Dolphins. In the first quarter, the Cardinals scored first as Kurt Warner threw 2 touchdown passes (one for 79 yard pass and another for 3 yard) to Anquan Boldin. In the second quarter, Arizona increased their lead with a 45-yard field goal by Neil Rackers. In the third quarter, the Cardinals increased its lead to 24–0 with rookie Tim Hightower scoring on a 1 yard touchdown run. The Dolphins finally scored when kicker Dan Carpenter converted a 32-yard field goal. The Cardinals responded with Warner throwing Boldin an 8 yard touchdown pass. In the fourth quarter, Miami tried to rally as running back Ronnie Brown rushed for a 1 yard Touchdown, but Arizona held on for a large win.

With the win, the Cardinals improved to its first 2–0 start since 1991. This game was also one of three times that Kurt Warner finished a game with a perfect passer rating.

=== Week 3: at Washington Redskins ===
Week 3: Arizona Cardinals at Washington Redskins – Game summary

Quarter	1	2	3	4	Total
Cardinals	0	7	10	0	17
Redskins	7	3	7	7	24

at FedExField, Landover, Maryland

- Date: September 21
- Game time: 1:00 p.m. EDT/10:00 a.m. MST
- Game weather: Sunny, 75 °F (24 °C)
- Game attendance: 90,060
- Referee: Alberto Riveron
- TV announcers (Fox): Kenny Albert, Daryl Johnston, and Tony Siragusa
- Box Score

Game information

First quarter

- WAS – Clinton Portis 3-yard run (Shaun Suisham kick), 8:28. Redskins 7–0. Drive: 11 plays, 60 yards, 6:32.

Second quarter

- WAS – Shaun Suisham 48-yard field goal, 13:08. Redskins 10–0. Drive: 4 plays, 4 yards, 1:52.
- ARI – Anquan Boldin 4-yard pass from Kurt Warner (Neil Rackers kick), 2:43. Redskins 10–7. Drive: 11 plays, 84 yards, 6:20.

Third quarter

- ARI – Neil Rackers 26-yard field goal, 9:20. Tied 10–10. Drive: 15 plays, 72 yards, 5:40.
- WAS – Todd Yoder 2-yard pass from Jason Campbell (Shaun Suisham kick), 3:16. Redskins 17–10. Drive: 11 plays, 80 yards, 6:04.
- ARI – Larry Fitzgerald 62-yard pass from Kurt Warner (Neil Rackers kick), 1:53. Tied 17–17. Drive: 3 plays, 85 yards, 1:23.

Fourth quarter

- WAS – Santana Moss 17-yard pass from Jason Campbell (Shaun Suisham kick), 12:10. Redskins 24–17. Drive: 2 plays, 15 yards, 0:48.

Top passers

- ARI – Kurt Warner – 16/30, 192 yards, 2 TD, INT
- WAS – Jason Campbell – 22/30, 193 yards, 2 TD

Top rushers

- ARI – Edgerrin James – 18 rushes, 93 yards
- WAS – Clinton Portis – 21 rushes, 68 yards, TD

Top receivers

- ARI – Larry Fitzgerald – 7 receptions, 109 yards, TD
- WAS – Santana Moss – 7 receptions, 72 yards, TD

Coming off their home win over the Dolphins, the Cardinals flew to FedExField for a Week 3 game with the Washington Redskins. In the first quarter, Arizona trailed early as Redskins Clinton Portis scored a touchdown on a 3 yard run. In the second quarter, the Cardinals continued to trail as Washington kicker Shaun Suisham converted a 48-yard field goal. The Cardinals would end the half with Kurt Warner completing a 4 yard touchdown pass to Anquan Boldin. In the third quarter, the Cardinals tied the game on kicker Neil Rackers' 26-yard field goal. Washington responded with Jason Campbell throwing a 2 yard touchdown pass to Todd Yoder. Afterwards, Arizona responded with Warner throwing a deep 62-yard touchdown pass to Larry Fitzgerald. However, in the fourth quarter, the Redskins took a lead, and ultimately the game, on a Campbell 17-yard touchdown pass to Santana Moss.

With the loss, the Cardinals fell to 2–1.

=== Week 4: at New York Jets ===
Week 4: Arizona Cardinals at New York Jets – Game summary

Quarter	1	2	3	4	Total
Cardinals	0	0	21	14	35
Jets	0	34	0	22	56

at Giants Stadium, East Rutherford, New Jersey

- Date: September 28
- Game time: 1:00 p.m. EDT/10:00 a.m. MST
- Game weather: Overcast, 69 °F (21 °C)
- Game attendance: 78,222
- Referee: Scott Green
- TV announcers (Fox): Dick Stockton, Brian Baldinger, Brian Billick, and Laura Okmin
- Box Score

Game information

First quarter

- No scoring plays

Second quarter

- NYJ – Laveranues Coles 12-yard pass from Brett Favre (Jay Feely kick), 14:44. Jets 7–0. Drive: 10 plays, 49 yards, 5:18.
- NYJ – Darrelle Revis 32-yard interception return (Jay Feely kick), 13:25. Jets 14–0.
- NYJ – Laveranues Coles 34-yard pass from Brett Favre (Jay Feely kick), 7:17. Jets 21–0. Drive: 4 plays, 83 yards, 2:27.
- NYJ – Jay Feely 20-yard field goal, 3:32. Jets 24–0. Drive: 8 plays, 17 yards, 3:28.
- NYJ – Laveranues Coles 2-yard pass from Brett Favre (Jay Feely kick), 0:10. Jets 31–0. Drive: 7 plays, 40 yards, 1:50.
- NYJ – Jay Feely 30-yard field goal, 0:00. Jets 34–0. Drive: 1 play, 0 yards, 0:02.

Third quarter

- ARI – Edgerrin James 4-yard run (Neil Rackers kick), 12:39. Jets 34–7. Drive: 6 plays, 79 yards, 2:21.
- ARI – Edgerrin James 2-yard run (Edgerrin James run), 5:41. Jets 34–15. Drive: 13 plays, 76 yards, 5:06.
- ARI – Tim Hightower 1-yard run (pass failed), 2:50. Jets 34–21. Drive: 7 plays, 54 yards, 2:51.

Fourth quarter

- NYJ – Jerricho Cotchery 17-yard pass from Brett Favre (Jay Feely kick), 11:50. Jets 41–21. Drive: 12 plays, 80 yards, 6:00.
- ARI – Anquan Boldin 8-yard pass from Kurt Warner (Neil Rackers kick), 9:49. Jets 41–28. Drive: 6 plays, 62 yards, 2:01.
- NYJ – Jerricho Cotchery 40-yard pass from Brett Favre (Jay Feely kick), 7:26. Jets 48–28. Drive: 4 plays, 49 yards, 2:23.
- ARI – Jerheme Urban 14-yard pass from Kurt Warner (Neil Rackers kick), 4:49. Jets 48–35. Drive: 6 plays, 66 yards, 2:37.
- NYJ – Dustin Keller 24-yard pass from Brett Favre (Leon Washington run), 1:54. Jets 56–35. Drive: 4 plays, 29 yards, 1:04.

Top passers

- ARI – Kurt Warner – 40/57, 472 yards, 2 TD, 3 INT
- NYJ – Brett Favre – 24/34, 289 yards, 6 TD, INT

Top rushers

- ARI – Edgerrin James – 9 rushes, 29 yards, 2 TD
- NYJ – Thomas Jones – 18 rushes, 46 yards

Top receivers

- ARI – Steve Breaston – 9 receptions, 122 yards
- NYJ – Laveranues Coles – 8 receptions, 105 yards, 3 TD

Hoping to rebound from their road loss to the Redskins, the Cardinals flew to The Meadowlands for a Week 4 interconference duel with the New York Jets. After a scoreless first quarter, Arizona started to trail big in the second quarter. The Jets took flight with QB Brett Favre completing a 12-yard TD pass to WR Laveranues Coles, CB Darrelle Revis returning an interception 32 yards for a touchdown, Favre completing a 34-yard TD pass to Coles, kicker Jay Feely getting 20-yard field goal, Favre completing a two-yard TD pass to Coles, and Feely kicking a 30-yard field goal.

In the third quarter, the Cardinals responded with RB Edgerrin James getting a four-yard and a two-yard TD run, along with rookie RB Tim Hightower getting a one-yard TD run. In the fourth quarter, New York answered with Favre's 17-yard TD pass to WR Jerricho Cotchery. The Cardinals would reply with QB Kurt Warner completing an eight-yard TD pass to WR Anquan Boldin, yet the Jets continued their victory march with Favre's 40-yard TD pass to Cotchery. Arizona tried to rally as Warner completed a 14-yard TD pass to WR Jerheme Urban, but New York sealed the win with Favre's 24-yard TD pass to TE Dustin Keller.

The Jets only had 373 yards of total offense compared to the Cardinals' 468, but the Cardinals committed seven turnovers during the game, with Warner throwing three interceptions and losing three fumbles, while Boldin lost another fumble.

With the loss, the Cardinals fell to 2–2.

=== Week 5: vs. Buffalo Bills ===
Week 5: Buffalo Bills at Arizona Cardinals – Game summary

Quarter	1	2	3	4	Total
Bills	0	14	3	0	17
Cardinals	7	17	7	10	41

at University of Phoenix Stadium, Glendale, Arizona

- Date: October 5
- Game time: 1:15 p.m. MST
- Game weather: None (retractable roof closed)
- Game attendance: 63,830
- Referee: Jerome Boger
- TV announcers (Fox): Bill Macatee and Steve Beuerlein
- Box Score

Game information

First quarter

- ARI – Larry Fitzgerald 2-yard pass from Kurt Warner (Neil Rackers kick), 9:52. Cardinals 7–0. Drive: 6 plays, 38 yards, 2:31.

Second quarter

- ARI – Tim Hightower 17-yard run (Neil Rackers kick), 14:15. Cardinals 14–0. Drive: 14 plays, 80 yards, 6:40.
- BUF – Lee Evans 87-yard pass from J. P. Losman (Rian Lindell kick), 12:09. Cardinals 14–7. Drive: 3 plays, 83 yards, 2:06.
- ARI – Edgerrin James 1-yard run (Neil Rackers kick), 5:51. Cardinals 21–7. Drive: 12 plays, 78 yards, 6:18.
- BUF – J. P. Losman 2-yard run (Rian Lindell kick), 1:46. Cardinals 21–14. Drive: 8 plays, 63 yards, 4:05.
- ARI – Neil Rackers 47-yard field goal, 0:00. Cardinals 24–14. Drive: 9 plays, 44 yards, 1:46.

Third quarter

- BUF – Rian Lindell 48-yard field goal, 9:35. Cardinals 24–17. Drive: 5 plays, 26 yards, 3:03.
- ARI – Larry Fitzgerald 2-yard pass from Kurt Warner (Neil Rackers kick), 2:33. Cardinals 31–17. Drive: 13 plays, 78 yards, 7:02.

Fourth quarter

- ARI – Neil Rackers 38-yard field goal, 14:55. Cardinals 34–17. Drive: 4 plays, 8 yards, 2:18.
- ARI – Tim Hightower 2-yard run (Neil Rackers kick), 10:35. Cardinals 41–17. Drive: 6 plays, 19 yards, 2:57.

Top passers

- BUF – J. P. Losman – 15/21, 220 yards, TD, INT
- ARI – Kurt Warner – 33/42, 250 yards, 2 TD

Top rushers

- BUF – Marshawn Lynch – 12 rushes, 44 yards
- ARI – Edgerrin James – 21 rushes, 57 yards, TD

Top receivers

- BUF – Lee Evans – 2 receptions, 100 yards, TD
- ARI – Steve Breaston – 7 receptions, 77 yards

Hoping to rebound from their miserable road loss to the Jets, the Cardinals went home for a Week 5 interconference duel with the Buffalo Bills. In the first quarter, the Cardinals took flight as QB Kurt Warner completed a two-yard TD pass to WR Larry Fitzgerald. In the second quarter, Arizona increased its lead with rookie RB Tim Hightower getting a 17-yard TD run. The Bills responded with QB J. P. Losman completing an 87-yard TD pass to WR Lee Evans, yet the Cardinals answered right back with RB Edgerrin James getting a one-yard TD run. Buffalo would answer with Losman getting a two-yard TD run, yet the Cardinals continued its momentum with kicker Neil Rackers getting a 47-yard field goal.

In the third quarter, the Bills tried to come back as kicker Rian Lindell got a 48-yard field goal, but Arizona kept its intensity up as Warner completed a two-yard TD pass to Fitzgerald. In the fourth quarter, the Cardinals pulled away as Rackers nailed a 38-yard field goal, along with Hightower getting a two-yard TD run.

With the win, the Cardinals improved to 3–2.

=== Week 6: vs. Dallas Cowboys ===
Week 6: Dallas Cowboys at Arizona Cardinals – Game summary

Quarter	1	2	3	4	OT	Total
Cowboys	0	7	7	10	0	24
Cardinals	7	0	7	10	6	30

at University of Phoenix Stadium, Glendale, Arizona

- Date: October 12
- Game time: 1:15 p.m. MST
- Game weather: None (retractable roof closed)
- Game attendance: 64,389
- Referee: Peter Morelli
- TV announcers (Fox): Dick Stockton, Troy Aikman, and Pam Oliver
- Box Score

Game information

First quarter

- ARI – J. J. Arrington 93-yard kickoff return (Neil Rackers kick), 14:45. Cardinals 7–0.

Second quarter

- DAL – Patrick Crayton 55-yard pass from Tony Romo (Nick Folk kick), 0:59. Tied 7–7. Drive: 7 plays, 91 yards, 3:53.

Third quarter

- DAL – Miles Austin 14-yard pass from Tony Romo (Nick Folk kick), 8:11. Cowboys 14–7. Drive: 12 plays, 77 yards, 6:49.
- ARI – Larry Fitzgerald 2-yard pass from Kurt Warner (Neil Rackers kick), 3:21. Tied 14–14. Drive: 11 plays, 60 yards, 4:50.

Fourth quarter

- ARI – Steve Breaston 11-yard pass from Kurt Warner (Neil Rackers kick), 10:44. Cardinals 21–14. Drive: 8 plays, 89 yards, 4:58.
- ARI – Neil Rackers 41-yard field goal, 3:17. Cardinals 24–14. Drive: 9 plays, 43 yards, 4:58.
- DAL – Marion Barber III 70-yard pass from Tony Romo (Nick Folk kick), 2:00. Cardinals 24–21. Drive: 4 plays, 77 yards, 1:17.
- DAL – Nick Folk 52-yard field goal, 0:00. Tied 24–24. Drive: 4 plays, 34 yards, 0:50.

Overtime

- ARI – Monty Beisel 3-yard blocked punt return, 14:00. Cardinals 30–24.

Top passers

- DAL – Tony Romo – 24/38, 321 yards, 3 TD
- ARI – Kurt Warner – 22/30, 236 yards, 2 TD, INT

Top rushers

- DAL – Marion Barber III – 17 rushes, 45 yards
- ARI – Edgerrin James – 9 rushes, 29 yards

Top receivers

- DAL – Marion Barber III – 11 receptions, 128 yards, TD
- ARI – Steve Breaston – 8 receptions, 102 yards, TD

Coming off their rout over the Bills, the Cardinals stayed at home for a crucial Week 6 showdown with the Dallas Cowboys. In the first quarter, the Cardinals immediately took flight as RB J. J. Arrington returned the game's opening kickoff 93 yards for a touchdown. In the second quarter, the Cowboys tied the game as QB Tony Romo completed a 55-yard TD pass to WR Patrick Crayton. In the third quarter, Dallas took the lead with Romo completing a 14-yard TD pass to WR Miles Austin. Arizona would tie the game with QB Kurt Warner completing a two-yard TD pass to WR Larry Fitzgerald. In the fourth quarter, the Cardinals regained the lead as Warner completed an 11-yard TD pass to WR Steve Breaston, along with kicker Neil Rackers getting a 41-yard field goal. However, the Cowboys tied the game as Romo completed a 70-yard TD pass to RB Marion Barber, along with kicker Nick Folk nailing a 52-yard field goal. In overtime, after forcing a three-and-out, Arizona got the win as WR Sean Morey blocked a Mat McBriar punt attempt, allowing LB Monty Beisel to return it 3 yards for the game-winning touchdown. McBriar would end up with his foot fractured and put on the IR by the Cowboys.

With the impressive win, the Cardinals entered their bye week at 4–2.

In the NFL's 423rd recorded overtime game, this was the first game to end with a blocked punt getting returned for a touchdown.

=== Week 8: at Carolina Panthers ===
Week 8: Arizona Cardinals at Carolina Panthers – Game summary

Quarter	1	2	3	4	Total
Cardinals	3	7	13	0	23
Panthers	0	3	21	3	27

at Bank of America Stadium, Charlotte, North Carolina

- Date: October 26
- Game time: 1:00 p.m. EDT/10:00 a.m. MST
- Game weather: Sunny, 70 °F (21 °C)
- Game attendance: 72,010
- Referee: Walt Coleman
- TV announcers (Fox): Matt Vasgersian, Brian Baldinger, and Laura Okmin
- Box Score

Game information

First quarter

- ARI – Neil Rackers 21-yard field goal, 6:56. Cardinals 3–0. Drive: 13 plays, 80 yards, 6:24.

Second quarter

- ARI – Anquan Boldin 5-yard pass from Kurt Warner (Neil Rackers kick), 11:16. Cardinals 10–0. Drive: 1 play, 5 yards, 0:05.
- CAR – John Kasay 23-yard field goal, 5:42. Cardinals 10–3. Drive: 14 plays, 72 yards, 5:34.

Third quarter

- ARI – Tim Hightower 2-yard run (Neil Rackers kick), 10:13. Cardinals 17–3. Drive: 8 plays, 64 yards, 4:47.
- CAR – DeAngelo Williams 15-yard run (John Kasay kick), 6:54. Cardinals 17–10. Drive: 6 plays, 80 yards, 3:19.
- CAR – Steve Smith 18-yard pass from Jake Delhomme (John Kasay kick), 6:10. Tied 17–17. Drive: 1 play, 18 yards, 0:05.
- ARI – Anquan Boldin 2-yard pass from Kurt Warner (kick failed), 0:58. Cardinals 23–17. Drive: 11 plays, 78 yards, 5:12.
- CAR – Steve Smith 65-yard pass from Jake Delhomme (John Kasay kick), 0:02. Panthers 24–23. Drive: 3 plays, 73 yards, 0:56.

Fourth quarter

- CAR – John Kasay 50-yard field goal, 9:09. Panthers 27–23. Drive: 5 plays, 19 yards, 2:29.

Top passers

- ARI – Kurt Warner – 35/49, 381 yards, 2 TD, INT
- CAR – Jake Delhomme – 20/28, 248 yards, 2 TD

Top rushers

- ARI – Anquan Boldin – 1 rush, 30 yards
- CAR – DeAngelo Williams – 17 rushes, 108 yards, TD

Top receivers

- ARI – Larry Fitzgerald – 7 receptions, 115 yards
- CAR – Steve Smith – 5 receptions, 117 yards, 2 TD

Coming off their bye week, the Cardinals flew to Bank of America Stadium for a Week 8 duel with the Carolina Panthers. In the first quarter, the Cardinals took flight as kicker Neil Rackers got a 21-yard field goal. In the second quarter, Arizona increased its lead as QB Kurt Warner completed a five-yard TD pass to WR Anquan Boldin. The Panthers closed out the half with kicker John Kasay getting a 23-yard field goal.

In the third quarter, the Cardinals increased their lead as rookie RB Tim Hightower got a two-yard TD run. However, Carolina began to rally as RB DeAngelo Williams got a 15-yard TD run, while QB Jake Delhomme completed an 18-yard TD pass to WR Steve Smith. The Cardinals replied with Warner hooking up with Boldin again on a two-yard TD pass (with a failed PAT), but the Panthers took the lead on Delhomme's 65-yard TD pass to Smith. In the fourth quarter, Carolina pulled away as Kasay nailed a 50-yard field goal.

With the tough loss, the Cardinals fell to 4–3.

=== Week 9: at St. Louis Rams ===
Week 9: Arizona Cardinals at St. Louis Rams – Game summary

Quarter	1	2	3	4	Total
Cardinals	0	24	7	3	34
Rams	7	0	0	6	13

at Edward Jones Dome, St. Louis, Missouri

- Date: November 2
- Game time: 12:00 p.m. CST/11:00 a.m. MST
- Game weather: None (indoor stadium)
- Game attendance: 61,303
- Referee: Jeff Triplette
- TV announcers (Fox): Thom Brennaman and Brian Billick
- Box Score

Game information

First quarter

- STL – Derek Stanley 80-yard pass from Marc Bulger (Josh Brown kick), 4:23. Rams 7–0. Drive: 1 play, 80 yards, 0:11.

Second quarter

- ARI – Antrel Rolle 40-yard interception return (Neil Rackers kick), 12:10. Tied 7–7.
- ARI – Neil Rackers 36-yard field goal, 8:09. Cardinals 10–7. Drive: 4 plays, 5 yards, 1:06.
- ARI – Tim Hightower 30-yard run (Neil Rackers kick), 1:53. Cardinals 17–7. Drive: 5 plays, 92 yards, 2:50.
- ARI – Jerheme Urban 56-yard pass from Kurt Warner (Neil Rackers kick), 0:42. Cardinals 24–7. Drive: 2 plays, 56 yards, 0:36.

Third quarter

- ARI – Anquan Boldin 7-yard pass from Kurt Warner (Neil Rackers kick), 3:16. Cardinals 31–7. Drive: 8 plays, 82 yards, 5:01.

Fourth quarter

- STL – Torry Holt 3-yard pass from Marc Bulger (pass failed), 12:17. Cardinals 31–13. Drive: 5 plays, 31 yards, 1:48.
- ARI – Neil Rackers 30-yard field goal, 3:27. Cardinals 34–13. Drive: 12 plays, 70 yards, 8:50.

Top passers

- ARI – Kurt Warner – 22/33, 343 yards, 2 TD
- STL – Marc Bulger – 16/33, 186 yards, 2 TD, 2 INT

Top rushers

- ARI – Tim Hightower – 22 rushes, 109 yards, TD
- STL – Marc Bulger – 3 rushes, 32 yards

Top receivers

- ARI – Anquan Boldin – 6 receptions, 85 yards, TD
- STL – Derek Stanley – 1 reception, 80 yards, TD

Hoping to rebound from their road loss to the Panthers, the Cardinals flew to the Edward Jones Dome for a Week 9 NFC West duel with the St. Louis Rams. In the first quarter, Arizona trailed early as Rams QB Marc Bulger completed an 80-yard TD pass to WR Derek Stanley. In the second quarter, the Cardinals took flight as Safety Antrel Rolle returned an interception 40 yards for a touchdown, kicker Neil Rackers got a 36-yard field goal, rookie RB Tim Hightower got a 30-yard TD run, and former Rams QB Kurt Warner completed a 56-yard TD pass to WR Jerheme Urban.

In the third quarter, the Cardinals continued their domination as Warner completed a seven-yard TD pass to WR Anquan Boldin. In the fourth quarter, St. Louis tried to rally as Bulger completed a three-yard TD pass to WR Torry Holt (with a failed two-point conversion). Fortunately, Arizona pulled away as Rackers nailed a 30-yard field goal.

With the win, the Cardinals improved to 5–3.

=== Week 10: vs. San Francisco 49ers ===
Week 10: San Francisco 49ers at Arizona Cardinals – Game summary

Quarter	1	2	3	4	Total
49ers	7	14	3	0	24
Cardinals	3	10	7	9	29

at University of Phoenix Stadium, Glendale, Arizona

- Date: November 10
- Game time: 6:40 p.m. MST
- Game weather: Clear, 62 °F (17 °C) (retractable roof open)
- Game attendance: 64,519
- Referee: Tony Corrente
- TV announcers (ESPN): Mike Tirico, Ron Jaworski, Tony Kornheiser, Michele Tafoya, and Suzy Kolber
- Box Score

Game information

First quarter

- SF – Allen Rossum 104-yard kickoff return (Joe Nedney kick), 14:48. 49ers 7–0.
- ARI – Neil Rackers 28-yard field goal, 9:46. 49ers 7–3. Drive: 9 plays, 65 yards, 5:02.

Second quarter

- SF – Josh Morgan 31-yard pass from Shaun Hill (Joe Nedney kick), 14:13. 49ers 14–3. Drive: 3 plays, 55 yards, 1:13.
- ARI – Anquan Boldin 13-yard pass from Kurt Warner (Neil Rackers kick), 11:48. 49ers 14–10. Drive: 4 plays, 78 yards, 2:25.
- ARI – Neil Rackers 33-yard field goal, 4:41. 49ers 14–13. Drive: 12 plays, 65 yards, 5:32.
- SF – Vernon Davis 18-yard pass from Shaun Hill (Joe Nedney kick), 0:29. 49ers 21–13. Drive: 14 plays, 77 yards, 4:12.

Third quarter

- ARI – Larry Fitzgerald 5-yard pass from Kurt Warner (Neil Rackers kick), 11:37. 49ers 21–20. Drive: 7 plays, 61 yards, 3:23.
- SF – Joe Nedney 41-yard field goal, 7:02. 49ers 24–20. Drive: 9 plays, 33 yards, 4:35.

Fourth quarter

- ARI – Neil Rackers 23-yard field goal, 14:33. 49ers 24–23. Drive: 4 plays, 5 yards, 1:04.
- ARI – Anquan Boldin 4-yard pass from Kurt Warner (pass failed), 4:16. Cardinals 29–24. Drive: 2 plays, 5 yards, 0:50.

Top passers

- SF – Shaun Hill – 19/40, 217 yards, 2 TD, 2 INT
- ARI – Kurt Warner – 32/42, 328 yards, 3 TD

Top rushers

- SF – Frank Gore – 23 rushes, 99 yards
- ARI – Tim Hightower – 13 rushes, 22 yards

Top receivers

- SF – Jason Hill – 6 receptions, 82 yards
- ARI – Steve Breaston – 7 receptions, 124 yards

Coming off their divisional road win over the Rams, the Cardinals went home for a Week 10 NFC West rematch with the San Francisco 49ers on Monday Night Football. In the first quarter, Arizona trailed early as 49ers CB Allen Rossum returned the game's opening kickoff 104 yards for a touchdown. The Cardinals would respond as kicker Neil Rackers got a 28-yard field goal. In the second quarter, San Francisco added onto their lead as QB Shaun Hill completed a 31-yard TD pass to WR Josh Morgan. The Cardinals would answer with QB Kurt Warner completing a 13-yard TD pass to WR Anquan Boldin, along with Rackers getting a 33-yard field goal. The 49ers would close out the half with Hill completing an 18-yard TD pass to TE Vernon Davis.

In the third quarter, Arizona crept closer again as Warner completed a five-yard TD pass to WR Larry Fitzgerald, yet San Francisco replied with kicker Joe Nedney getting a 41-yard field goal. In the fourth quarter, the Cardinals took the lead as Rackers nailed a 23-yard field goal, along with Warner hooking up with Boldin again on a five-yard TD pass (with a failed two-point conversion.) The 49ers would mount a late comeback drive, but Arizona made a successful goal-line stand as time ran out.

With the win, the Cardinals improved to 6–3.

=== Week 11: at Seattle Seahawks ===
Week 11: Arizona Cardinals at Seattle Seahawks – Game summary

Quarter	1	2	3	4	Total
Cardinals	10	6	10	0	26
Seahawks	0	7	0	13	20

at Qwest Field, Seattle, Washington

- Date: November 16
- Game time: 1:05 p.m. PST/2:05 p.m. MST
- Game weather: Sunny, 52 °F (11 °C)
- Game attendance: 67,616
- Referee: Bill Carollo
- TV announcers (Fox): Dick Stockton, Brian Baldinger, and Laura Okmin
- Box Score

Game information

First quarter

- ARI – Neil Rackers 38-yard field goal, 7:47. Cardinals 3–0. Drive: 13 plays, 60 yards, 7:13.
- ARI – J. J. Arrington 4-yard run (Neil Rackers kick), 0:04. Cardinals 10–0. Drive: 7 plays, 89 yards, 3:36.

Second quarter

- ARI – Neil Rackers 48-yard field goal, 4:34. Cardinals 13–0. Drive: 10 plays, 65 yards, 4:56.
- SEA – Maurice Morris 13-yard pass from Matt Hasselbeck (Olindo Mare kick), 0:57. Cardinals 13–7. Drive: 3 plays, 19 yards, 0:47.
- ARI – Neil Rackers 54-yard field goal, 0:00. Cardinals 16–7. Drive: 6 plays, 27 yards, 0:57.

Third quarter

- ARI – Neil Rackers 26-yard field goal, 9:36. Cardinals 19–7. Drive: 7 plays, 59 yards, 3:14.
- ARI – J. J. Arrington 6-yard pass from Kurt Warner (Neil Rackers kick), 1:55. Cardinals 26–7. Drive: 10 plays, 82 yards, 4:50.

Fourth quarter

- SEA – T.J. Duckett 1-yard run (pass failed), 12:46. Cardinals 26–13. Drive: 5 plays, 11 yards, 2:01.
- SEA – T.J. Duckett 2-yard run (Olindo Mare kick), 9:41. Cardinals 26–20. Drive: 5 plays, 14 yards, 2:51.

Top passers

- ARI – Kurt Warner – 32/44, 395 yards, TD, INT
- SEA – Matt Hasselbeck – 17/29, 170 yards, TD, 3 INT

Top rushers

- ARI – J. J. Arrington – 8 rushes, 40 yards, TD
- SEA – Julius Jones – 10 rushes, 19 yards

Top receivers

- ARI – Anquan Boldin – 13 receptions, 186 yards
- SEA – Deion Branch – 4 receptions, 54 yards

Coming off their close MNF home win over the 49ers, the Cardinals flew to Qwest Field for a Week 11 NFC West duel with the Seattle Seahawks. In the first quarter, the Cardinals took flight as kicker Neil Rackers got a 38-yard field goal, along with RB J. J. Arrington getting a four-yard TD run. In the second quarter, Arizona increased its lead with Rackers making a 48-yard field goal. The Seahawks answered with QB Matt Hasselbeck completing a 13-yard TD pass to RB Maurice Morris. The Cardinals would close out the half with Rackers getting a 54-yard field goal.

In the third quarter, the Cardinals increased their lead as Rackers nailed a 26-yard field goal and QB Kurt Warner completed a six-yard TD pass to Arrington. In the fourth quarter, Seattle tried to rally as RB T. J. Duckett got a one-yard TD run (with a failed two-point conversion) and a two-yard TD run. Fortunately, rookie CB Dominique Rodgers-Cromartie came up with the game-winning interception.

With the win, not only did the Cardinals win three straight for the first time since 2002, but they improved to 7–3 for the first time since 1977.

=== Week 12: vs. New York Giants ===
Week 12: New York Giants at Arizona Cardinals – Game summary

Quarter	1	2	3	4	Total
Giants	0	17	7	13	37
Cardinals	3	9	7	10	29

at University of Phoenix Stadium, Glendale, Arizona

- Date: November 23
- Game time: 2:15 p.m. MST
- Game weather: None (retractable roof closed)
- Game attendance: 64,541
- Referee: Peter Morelli
- TV announcers (Fox): Kenny Albert, Daryl Johnston, and Tony Siragusa
- Box Score

Game information

First quarter

- ARI – Neil Rackers 32-yard field goal, 6:18. Cardinals 3–0. Drive: 13 plays, 63 yards, 6:57.

Second quarter

- NYG – Derrick Ward 1-yard run (John Carney kick), 11:38. Giants 7–3. Drive: 11 plays, 62 yards, 6:08.
- ARI – Tim Hightower 4-yard run (pass failed), 7:51. Cardinals 9–7. Drive: 7 plays, 42 yards, 3:47.
- NYG – John Carney 33-yard field goal, 6:51. Giants 10–9. Drive: 4 plays, 2 yards, 1:00.
- ARI – Neil Rackers 20-yard field goal, 3:49. Cardinals 12–10. Drive: 6 plays, 49 yards, 3:02.
- NYG – Amani Toomer 12-yard pass from Eli Manning (John Carney kick), 1:08. Giants 17–12. Drive: 6 plays, 32 yards, 2:41.

Third quarter

- NYG – Madison Hedgecock 2-yard pass from Eli Manning (John Carney kick), 10:35. Giants 24–12. Drive: 4 plays, 40 yards, 2:04.
- ARI – Tim Hightower 1-yard run (Neil Rackers kick), 0:49. Giants 24–19. Drive: 12 plays, 90 yards, 4:40.

Fourth quarter

- NYG – Kevin Boss 10-yard pass from Eli Manning (John Carney kick), 11:15. Giants 31–19. Drive: 10 plays, 80 yards, 4:34.
- NYG – John Carney 27-yard field goal, 6:17. Giants 34–19. Drive: 7 plays, 20 yards, 4:13.
- ARI – Anquan Boldin 5-yard pass from Kurt Warner (Neil Rackers kick), 4:02. Giants 34–26. Drive: 6 plays, 52 yards, 2:15.
- NYG – John Carney 33-yard field goal, 1:55. Giants 37–26. Drive: 6 plays, 30 yards, 2:07.
- ARI – Neil Rackers 44-yard field goal, 0:31. Giants 37–29. Drive: 8 plays, 43 yards, 1:24.

Top passers

- NYG – Eli Manning – 26/33, 240 yards, 3 TD
- ARI – Kurt Warner – 32/52, 351 yards, TD, INT

Top rushers

- NYG – Derrick Ward – 20 rushes, 69 yards, TD
- ARI – Tim Hightower – 11 rushes, 21 yards, 2 TD

Top receivers

- NYG – Domenik Hixon – 6 receptions, 57 yards
- ARI – Anquan Boldin – 11 receptions, 87 yards, TD

Coming off their divisional road win over the Seahawks, the Cardinals went home for a Week 12 duel with the defending Super Bowl champions, the New York Giants. In the first quarter, Arizona took fight as kicker Neil Rackers got a 34-yard field goal. In the second quarter, the Giants responded with RB Derrick Ward getting a one-yard TD run. The Cardinals would regain the lead with rookie RB Tim Hightower getting a four-yard TD run (with a failed extra-point attempt), yet New York answered with kicker John Carney getting a 33-yard field goal. The Cardinals would reply with Rackers making a 20-yard field goal, yet the Giants closed out the half with QB Eli Manning completing a 12-yard TD pass to WR Amani Toomer.

In the third quarter, New York increased their lead as Manning completed a two-yard TD pass to FB Madison Hedgecock. Arizona would answer with Hightower getting a one-yard TD run. In the fourth quarter, the Giants were starting to pull away as Manning completed a 10-yard TD pass to TE Kevin Boss, while Carney made a 27-yard field goal. The Cardinals tried to keep pace as QB Kurt Warner completed a five-yard TD pass to WR Anquan Boldin, yet New York replied with Carney's 33-yard field goal. Arizona tried to come back as Rackers nailed a 44-yard field goal, but their following onside kick failed, preserving the Giants' win.

With the loss, the Cardinals fell to 7–4.

=== Week 13: at Philadelphia Eagles ===
Week 13: Arizona Cardinals at Philadelphia Eagles – Game summary

Quarter	1	2	3	4	Total
Cardinals	0	7	6	7	20
Eagles	14	10	10	14	48

at Lincoln Financial Field, Philadelphia, Pennsylvania

- Date: November 27
- Game time: 8:15 p.m. EST/6:15 p.m. MST
- Game weather: Partly Cloudy, 41 °F (5 °C)
- Game attendance: 69,144
- Referee: Alberto Riveron
- TV announcers (NFL Network): Bob Papa and Cris Collinsworth
- Box Score

Game information

First quarter

- PHI – Brian Westbrook 5-yard pass from Donovan McNabb (David Akers kick), 7:56. Eagles 7–0. Drive: 12 plays, 70 yards, 7:04.
- PHI – Brian Westbrook 1-yard run (David Akers kick), 3:27. Eagles 14–0. Drive: 4 plays, 41 yards, 1:36.

Second quarter

- PHI – Brian Westbrook 2-yard pass from Donovan McNabb (David Akers kick), 8:24. Eagles 21–0. Drive: 10 plays, 60 yards, 5:49.
- ARI – Larry Fitzgerald 1-yard pass from Kurt Warner (Neil Rackers kick), 2:58. Eagles 21–7. Drive: 11 plays, 81 yards, 5:26.
- PHI – David Akers 42-yard field goal, 0:01. Eagles 24–7. Drive: 12 plays, 43 yards, 2:57.

Third quarter

- PHI – Brian Westbrook 9-yard run (David Akers kick), 6:17. Eagles 31–7. Drive: 11 plays, 68 yards, 5:26.
- ARI – Steve Breaston 6-yard pass from Kurt Warner (pass failed), 3:21. Eagles 31–13. Drive: 4 plays, 35 yards, 1:17.
- PHI – David Akers 41-yard field goal, 0:23. Eagles 34–13. Drive: 6 plays, 54 yards, 2:58.

Fourth quarter

- ARI – Larry Fitzgerald 7-yard pass from Kurt Warner (Neil Rackers kick), 14:15. Eagles 34–20. Drive: 5 plays, 74 yards, 1:08.
- PHI – DeSean Jackson 5-yard pass from Donovan McNabb (David Akers kick), 10:27. Eagles 41–20. Drive: 5 plays, 19 yards, 1:56.
- PHI – Jason Avant 8-yard pass from Donovan McNabb (David Akers kick), 5:19. Eagles 48–20. Drive: 7 plays, 36 yards, 3:52.

Top passers

- ARI – Kurt Warner – 21/39, 235 yards, 3 TD, 3 INT
- PHI – Donovan McNabb – 27/39, 260 yards, 4 TD

Top rushers

- ARI – J. J. Arrington – 2 rushes, 10 yards
- PHI – Brian Westbrook – 22 rushes, 110 yards, 2 TD

Top receivers

- ARI – Larry Fitzgerald – 5 receptions, 65 yards, 2 TD
- PHI – DeSean Jackson – 6 receptions, 76 yards, TD

Hoping to rebound from their tough home loss to the Giants, the Cardinals flew to Lincoln Financial Field for a Week 13 Thanksgiving battle with the Philadelphia Eagles. In the first quarter, Arizona trailed early as Eagles QB Donovan McNabb completed a five-yard TD pass to RB Brian Westbrook, while Westbrook got a one-yard TD run. In the second quarter, the Cardinals continued to trail as McNabb hooked up with Westbrook again on a two-yard TD pass. The Cardinals would respond as QB Kurt Warner completed a one-yard TD pass to WR Larry Fitzgerald. Philadelphia would close out the half with kicker David Akers making a 42-yard field goal.

In the third quarter, Arizona's struggles continued as Westbrook got a nine-yard TD run. The Cardinals would answer with Warner completed a six-yard TD pass to WR Steve Breaston (with a failed two-point conversion.) The Eagles would reply as Akers got a 41-yard field goal. In the fourth quarter, the Cardinals tried to rally as Warner hooked up with Fitzgerald again on a seven-yard TD pass. However, Philadelphia replied with McNabb completing a 5-yard TD pass to WR DeSean Jackson, along with an eight-yard TD pass to WR Jason Avant.

With the loss, the Cardinals fell to 7–5.

=== Week 14: vs. St. Louis Rams ===
Week 14: St. Louis Rams at Arizona Cardinals – Game summary

Quarter	1	2	3	4	Total
Rams	0	7	0	3	10
Cardinals	14	6	7	7	34

at University of Phoenix Stadium, Glendale, Arizona

- Date: December 7
- Game time: 2:15 p.m. MST
- Game weather: 63 °F (17 °C), (retractable roof open)
- Game attendance: 63,720
- Referee: Walt Coleman
- TV announcers (Fox): Matt Vasgersian, J. C. Pearson, and Nischelle Turner
- Box Score

Game information

First quarter

- ARI – Tim Hightower 1-yard run (Neil Rackers kick), 8:46. Cardinals 7–0. Drive: 10 plays, 76 yards, 6:14.
- ARI – Larry Fitzgerald 12-yard pass from Kurt Warner (Neil Rackers kick), 4:13. Cardinals 14–0. Drive: 6 plays, 63 yards, 2:21.

Second quarter

- STL – Steven Jackson 3-yard pass from Marc Bulger (Josh Brown kick), 14:14. Cardinals 14–7. Drive: 3 plays, 6 yards, 0:52.
- ARI – Neil Rackers 44-yard field goal, 0:09. Cardinals 17–7. Drive: 13 plays, 53 yards, 7:14.
- ARI – Neil Rackers 22-yard field goal, 0:09. Cardinals 20–7. Drive: 6 plays, 64 yards, 1:48.

Third quarter

- ARI – Darnell Dockett 11-yard fumble return (Neil Rackers kick), 4:20. Cardinals 27–7.

Fourth quarter

- STL – Josh Brown 51-yard field goal, 10:21. Cardinals 27–10. Drive: 7 plays, 23 yards, 2:02.
- ARI – Dominique Rodgers-Cromartie 99-yard interception return (Neil Rackers kick), 3:11. Cardinals 34–10.

Top passers

- STL – Marc Bulger – 22/37, 228 yards, TD, INT
- ARI – Kurt Warner – 24/33, 279 yards, TD, INT

Top rushers

- STL – Steven Jackson – 18 rushes, 63 yards
- ARI – Tim Hightower – 12 rushes, 32 yards, TD

Top receivers

- STL – Torry Holt – 5 receptions, 61 yards
- ARI – Steve Breaston – 7 receptions, 90 yards

Arizona dominated St Louis to win the NFC West and clinch their first home playoff game since 1947. Arizona took a 14–0 lead in the first quarter after a one-yard TD run by Tim Hightower and a Kurt Warner 12-yard TD pass to Larry Fitzgerald. In the second quarter the Rams would score on a three-yard TD pass from Marc Bulger to Steven Jackson, following a Kurt Warner interception. The Cardinals would respond with two field goals from Neil Rackers from 44 and 22 yards to make the halftime score 20–7. In the third quarter, Cardinals linebacker, Gerald Hayes, would force two Steven Jackson fumbles, the second one recovered by Darnell Dockett, who would return it 11 yards to the end zone for a touchdown. Down 27–7, the Rams attempted to come back in the fourth quarter, starting with a Josh Brown 51-yard field goal to make the score 27–10, but a Bulger pass was intercepted by rookie cornerback, Dominique Rodgers-Cromartie, for a 99 yard touchdown that sealed the game and propelled the Cardinals to their first playoff game since 1998, and their first division title since the days the Cardinals were in St. Louis in 1975.

With the win, the Cardinals record improved to 8–5.

=== Week 15: vs. Minnesota Vikings ===
Week 15: Minnesota Vikings at Arizona Cardinals – Game summary

Quarter	1	2	3	4	Total
Vikings	21	7	7	0	35
Cardinals	0	0	14	0	14

at University of Phoenix Stadium, Glendale, Arizona

- Date: December 14
- Game time: 2:05 p.m. MST
- Game weather: Cloudy, 54 °F (12 °C) (retractable roof open)
- Game attendance: 64,457
- Referee: Ron Winter
- TV announcers (Fox): Joe Buck, Troy Aikman, and Pam Oliver
- Box Score

Game information

First quarter

- MIN – Bernard Berrian 82-yard punt return (Ryan Longwell kick), 11:05. Vikings 7–0.
- MIN – Bernard Berrian 41-yard pass from Tarvaris Jackson (Ryan Longwell kick), 6:39. Vikings 14–0. Drive: 6 plays, 47 yards, 2:51.
- MIN – Sidney Rice 6-yard pass from Tavaris Jackson (Ryan Longwell kick), 2:43. Vikings 21–0. Drive: 6 plays, 23 yards, 3:14.

Second quarter

- MIN – Chester Taylor 11-yard pass from Tavaris Jackson (Ryan Longwell kick), 2:08. Vikings 28–0. Drive: 12 plays, 91 yards, 7:06.

Third quarter

- ARI – Jerheme Urban 50-yard pass from Kurt Warner (Neil Rackers kick), 13:43. Vikings 28–7. Drive: 3 plays, 73 yards, 1:17.
- ARI – Roderick Hood 68-yard blocked field goal return (Neil Rackers kick), 4:27. Vikings 28–14.
- MIN – Bobby Wade 59-yard pass from Tavaris Jackson (Ryan Longwell kick), 0:17. Vikings 35–14. Drive: 7 plays, 80 yards, 4:10.

Fourth quarter

- No scoring plays

Top passers

- MIN – Tavaris Jackson – 11/17, 163 yards, 4 TD
- ARI – Kurt Warner – 29/45, 270 yards, TD, INT

Top rushers

- MIN – Adrian Peterson – 28 rushes, 165 yards
- ARI – J. J. Arrington – 2 rushes, 23 yards

Top receivers

- MIN – Bobby Wade – 2 receptions, 67 yards, TD
- ARI – Jerheme Urban – 3 receptions, 82 yards, TD

The Cardinals dueled with the Minnesota Vikings for the #3 seed in the NFC playoffs. Things looked bleak for the Cardinals from the beginning. The Vikings began their first quarter attack with an 82-yard punt return for a TD by Bernard Berrian. Two turnovers for the Cardinals, a Kurt Warner interception and an Anquan Boldin fumble, would lead to two touchdown passes from Tarvaris Jackson, a 41-yard pass to Berrian and a 19-yard pass to Sidney Rice. The Vikings took a 28–0 lead at halftime after an 11-yard TD pass from Jackson to Chester Taylor. The Cardinals would rally to cut the lead in half with a Jerheme Urban 50-yard TD catch and a field goal blocked by Dominique Rodgers-Cromartie and recovered by Roderick Hood, who returned it 68 yards for a touchdown. The Vikings would pull away at the end of the third quarter when Jackson threw a 59-yard TD pass to Bobby Wade.

With the loss, the Cardinals dropped to 8–6.

Kurt Warner was benched on the Cardinals last drive in the fourth quarter via a coaching decision.

=== Week 16: at New England Patriots ===
Week 16: Arizona Cardinals at New England Patriots – Game summary

Quarter	1	2	3	4	Total
Cardinals	0	0	0	7	7
Patriots	14	17	13	3	47

at Gillette Stadium, Foxborough, Massachusetts

- Date: December 21
- Game time: 1:00 p.m. EST/11:00 a.m. MST
- Game weather: Heavy Snow, 30 °F (−1 °C)
- Game attendance: 68,756
- Referee: Bill Leavy
- TV announcers (Fox): Kenny Albert, Daryl Johnston, and Tony Siragusa
- Box Score

Game information

First quarter

- NE – LaMont Jordan 1-yard run (Stephen Gostkowski kick), 8:57. Patriots 7–0. Drive: 7 plays, 33 yards, 3:47.
- NE – LaMont Jordan 3-yard run (Stephen Gostkowski kick), 3:46. Patriots 14–0. Drive: 7 plays, 55 yards, 3:03.

Second quarter

- NE – Kevin Faulk 15-yard pass from Matt Cassel (Stephen Gostkowski kick), 12:04. Patriots 21–0. Drive: 4 plays, 50 yards, 2:05.
- NE – Wes Welker 11-yard pass from Matt Cassel (Stephen Gostkowski kick), 1:52. Patriots 28–0. Drive: 12 plays, 69 yards, 5:33.
- NE – Stephen Gostkowski 38-yard field goal, 0:02. Patriots 31–0. Drive: 9 plays, 51 yards, 1:22.

Third quarter

- NE – Randy Moss 76-yard pass from Matt Cassel (Stephen Gostkowski kick), 14:41. Patriots 38–0. Drive: 1 play, 76 yards, 0:19.
- NE – Stephen Gostkowski 35-yard field goal, 8:20. Patriots 41–0. Drive: 11 plays, 52 yards, 5:24.
- NE – Stephen Gostkowski 24-yard field goal, 3:31. Patriots 44–0. Drive: 11 plays, 44 yards, 4:12.

Fourth quarter

- NE – Stephen Gostkowski 30-yard field goal, 14:51. Patriots 47–0. Drive: 5 plays, 3 yards, 1:01.
- ARI – Larry Fitzgerald 78-yard pass from Matt Leinart (Neil Rackers kick), 6:17. Patriots 47–7. Drive: 2 plays, 71 yards, 1:25.

Top passers

- ARI – Matt Leinart – 6/14, 138 yards, TD, INT
- NE – Matt Cassel – 20/36, 345 yards, 3 TD

Top rushers

- ARI – Edgerrin James – 4 rushes, 19 yards
- NE – Sammy Morris – 15 rushes, 88 yards

Top receivers

- ARI – Larry Fitzgerald – 3 receptions, 101 yards, TD
- NE – Jabar Gaffney – 5 receptions, 90 yards

Hoping to rebound from their home loss to the Vikings, the Cardinals flew to Gillette Stadium for a Week 16 interconference duel with the New England Patriots. Arizona would trail early in the first quarter as Patriots running back LaMont Jordan got a one-yard and a three-yard touchdown run. The Cardinals' east coast struggles continued in the second quarter as quarterback Matt Cassel completed a 15-yard touchdown pass to running back Kevin Faulk and an 11-yard touchdown pass to wide receiver Wes Welker, followed by kicker Stephen Gostkowski's 38-yard field goal.

In the third quarter, Arizona's deficit continued to climb as Cassel completed a 76-yard touchdown pass to wide receiver Randy Moss, followed by Gostkowski's 35- and 24-yard field goals. In the fourth quarter, New England concluded its domination with Gostkowski's 30-yard field goal. The Cardinals would then get a meaningless touchdown as quarterback Matt Leinart completed a 78-yard touchdown pass to wide receiver Larry Fitzgerald.

With the loss, Arizona fell to 8–7.

Original starting quarterback Kurt Warner (6/18 for 30 yards) was pulled in the third quarter via coach's decision.

=== Week 17: vs. Seattle Seahawks ===
Week 17: Seattle Seahawks at Arizona Cardinals – Game summary

Quarter	1	2	3	4	Total
Seahawks	7	7	0	7	21
Cardinals	0	14	14	6	34

at University of Phoenix Stadium, Glendale, Arizona

- Date: December 28
- Game time: 2:15 p.m. MST
- Game weather: None (retractable roof closed)
- Game attendance: 63,874
- Referee: Mike Carey
- TV announcers (Fox): Thom Brennaman and Brian Billick
- Box Score

Game information

First quarter

- SEA – T. J. Duckett 1-yard run (Olindo Mare kick), 7:32. Seahawks 7–0. Drive: 12 plays, 64 yards, 6:15.

Second quarter

- ARI – Jerheme Urban 16-yard pass from Kurt Warner (Neil Rackers kick), 5:45. Tied 7–7. Drive: 4 plays, 68 yards, 1:25.
- ARI – Larry Fitzgerald 5-yard pass from Kurt Warner (Neil Rackers kick), 4:23. Cardinals 14–7. Drive: 2 plays, 12 yards, 0:53.
- SEA – Deion Branch 30-yard pass from Seneca Wallace (Olindo Mare kick), 1:17. Tied 14–14. Drive: 7 plays, 74 yards, 3:06.

Third quarter

- ARI – Larry Fitzgerald 38-yard pass from Kurt Warner (Neil Rackers kick), 8:43. Cardinals 21–14. Drive: 7 plays, 68 yards, 3:58.
- ARI – Steve Breaston 14-yard pass from Kurt Warner (Neil Rackers kick), 1:16. Cardinals 28–14. Drive: 9 plays, 68 yards, 4:48.

Fourth quarter

- SEA – Deion Branch 2-yard pass from Seneca Wallace (Olindo Mare kick), 12:04. Cardinals 28–21. Drive: 13 plays, 80 yards, 4:12.
- ARI – Neil Rackers 23-yard field goal, 8:26. Cardinals 31–21. Drive: 8 plays, 75 yards, 3:38.
- ARI – Neil Rackers 32-yard field goal, 3:28. Cardinals 34–21. Drive: 7 plays, 57 yards, 3:59.

Top passers

- SEA – Seneca Wallace – 24/43, 250 yards, 2 TD, 2 INT
- ARI – Kurt Warner – 19/30, 263 yards, 4 TD, INT

Top rushers

- SEA – Maurice Morris – 15 rushes, 45 yards
- ARI – Edgerrin James – 14 rushes, 100 yards

Top receivers

- SEA – Deion Branch – 6 receptions, 90 yards, 2 TD
- ARI – Larry Fitzgerald – 5 receptions, 130 yards, 2 TD

Hoping to close out the regular season on a positive note, the Cardinals went home for a Week 17 NFC West rematch with the Seattle Seahawks. Arizona would trail early in the first quarter as Seahawks running back T. J. Duckett got a one-yard touchdown run. The Cardinals would respond in the second quarter with quarterback Kurt Warner completing a 16-yard touchdown pass to wide receiver Jerheme Urban and a five-yard touchdown pass to wide receiver Larry Fitzgerald. Seattle would tie the game at halftime with quarterback Seneca Wallace completing a 30-yard touchdown pass to wide receiver Deion Branch.

Arizona would regain the lead in the third quarter as Warner completed a 38-yard touchdown pass to Fitzgerald and a 14-yard touchdown pass to wide receiver Steve Breaston. Seattle tried to rally in the fourth quarter as Wallace completed a two-yard touchdown pass to Branch, yet the Cardinals would close out the game with kicker Neil Rackers nailing 23 and 32-yard field goals.

With the win, the Cardinals closed out the regular season at 9–7, and swept the NFC West for the first time in franchise history.

== Pro bowlers ==
The Cardinals had a total of 5 players selected to the 2009 Pro Bowl. On offense, Kurt Warner was the starting quarterback, with Larry Fitzgerald and Anquan Boldin both at wide receiver. On defense, Adrian Wilson went as one of the conference's defensive backs. Sean Morey would be start on special teams.

== Playoffs ==
=== Schedule ===
Round	Date	Opponent (seed)	Result	Record	Venue	Game Recap
Wild Card	January 3, 2009	Atlanta Falcons (5)	W 30–24	1–0	University of Phoenix Stadium	Recap
Divisional	January 10, 2009	at Carolina Panthers (2)	W 33–13	2–0	Bank of America Stadium	Recap
NFC Championship	January 18, 2009	Philadelphia Eagles (6)	W 32–25	3–0	University of Phoenix Stadium	Recap
Super Bowl XLIII	February 1, 2009	Pittsburgh Steelers (A2)	L 23–27	3–1	Raymond James Stadium	Recap

==== NFC Wild Card Playoffs: vs. (5) Atlanta Falcons ====
NFC Wild Card Playoffs: (5) Atlanta Falcons at (4) Arizona Cardinals – Game summary

Quarter	1	2	3	4	Total
Falcons	0	17	0	7	24
Cardinals	7	7	14	2	30

at University of Phoenix Stadium, Glendale, Arizona

- Date: January 3, 2009
- Game time: 2:30 p.m. MST
- Game weather: None (retractable roof closed)
- Game attendance: 62,848
- Referee: John Parry
- TV announcers (NBC): Tom Hammond, Cris Collinsworth and Tiki Barber
- Box Score

Game information

First quarter

- ARI – Larry Fitzgerald 42-yard pass from Kurt Warner (Neil Rackers kick), 10:28. Cardinals 7–0. Drive: 4 plays, 63 yards, 2:03.

Second quarter

- ATL – Jason Elam 30-yard field goal, 10:00. Cardinals 7–3. Drive: 14 plays, 80 yards, 7:31.
- ARI – Anquan Boldin 71-yard pass from Kurt Warner (Neil Rackers kick), 8:58. Cardinals 14–3. Drive: 3 plays, 72 yards, 1:02.
- ATL – Michael Turner 7-yard run (Jason Elam kick), 2:55. Cardinals 14–10. Drive: 14 plays, 77 yards, 6:03.
- ATL – Justin Peelle 2-yard pass from Matt Ryan (Jason Elam kick), 0:23. Falcons 17–14. Drive: 6 plays, 23 yards, 1:40.

Third quarter

- ARI – Antrel Rolle 27-yard fumble return (Neil Rackers kick), 14:08. Cardinals 21–17.
- ARI – Tim Hightower 4-yard run (Neil Rackers kick), 2:48. Cardinals 28–17. Drive: 14 plays, 76 yards, 7:43.

Fourth quarter

- ARI – Team safety, 12:37. Cardinals 30–17.
- ATL – Roddy White 5-yard pass from Matt Ryan (Jason Elam kick), 4:15. Cardinals 30–24. Drive: 9 plays, 58 yards, 3:36.

Top passers

- ATL – Matt Ryan – 26/40, 199 yards, 2 TD, 2 INT
- ARI – Kurt Warner – 19/32, 271 yards, 2 TD, INT

Top rushers

- ATL – Michael Turner – 18 rushes, 42 yards, TD
- ARI – Edgerrin James – 26 rushes, 73 yards

Top receivers

- ATL – Roddy White – 11 receptions, 84 yards, TD
- ARI – Larry Fitzgerald – 6 receptions, 101 yards, TD

Entering the playoffs at the NFC's fourth seed, the Cardinals began their playoff run at home against the number 5 Atlanta Falcons, in their first home playoff game since 1947, and their first in Arizona.

Arizona got the early lead in the first quarter as Kurt Warner completed a 42-yard touchdown pass to Larry Fitzgerald. The Falcons responded with kicker Jason Elam's 30-yard field goal. The Cardinals responded with Warner completed a 71-yard touchdown pass to Anquan Boldin. Atlanta took the halftime lead with running back Michael Turner scoring a seven-yard touchdown, followed by Matt Ryan completing a two-yard touchdown pass to Justin Peelle following a Kurt Warner interception.

Arizona regained the lead in the third quarter as safety Antrel Rolle returned a Turner fumble 27 yards for a touchdown, while rookie Tim Hightower scored a four-yard touchdown run. The Cardinals increased their lead in the fourth quarter as defensive end Antonio Smith sacked Ryan in his own end zone for a safety. The Falcons tried to come back as Ryan completed a five-yard touchdown pass to Roddy White, yet Arizona's offense ran out the clock. The Cardinals ended any chance the Falcons had for a comeback when Kurt Warner threw to Stephen Spach for 23 yards on a third and sixteen with 2:16 left in the game.

With the win, the Cardinals improved their overall record to 10–7.

==== NFC Divisional Playoffs: at (2) Carolina Panthers ====
NFC Divisional Playoffs: (4) Arizona Cardinals at (2) Carolina Panthers – Game summary

Quarter	1	2	3	4	Total
Cardinals	14	13	3	3	33
Panthers	7	0	0	6	13

at Bank of America Stadium, Charlotte, North Carolina

- Date: January 10, 2009
- Game time: 8:15 p.m. EST/6:15 p.m. MST
- Game weather: Showers, 45 °F (7 °C)
- Game attendance: 73,695
- Referee: Gene Steratore
- TV announcers (Fox): Kenny Albert, Daryl Johnston and Tony Siragusa
- Box Score

Game information

First quarter

- CAR – Jonathan Stewart 9-yard run (John Kasay kick), 11:56. Panthers 7–0. Drive: 5 plays, 50 yards, 3:04.
- ARI – Tim Hightower 3-yard pass from Kurt Warner (Neil Rackers kick), 2:43. Tied 7–7. Drive: 6 plays, 60 yards, 3:39.
- ARI – Edgerrin James 4-yard run (Neil Rackers kick), 1:47. Cardinals 14–7. Drive: 2 plays, 13 yards, 0:50.

Second quarter

- ARI – Neil Rackers 49-yard field goal, 10:16. Cardinals 17–7. Drive: 9 plays, 49 yards, 4:32.
- ARI – Neil Rackers 30-yard field goal, 5:28. Cardinals 20–7. Drive: 8 plays, 49 yards, 3:39.
- ARI – Larry Fitzgerald 29-yard pass from Kurt Warner (Neil Rackers kick), 3:32. Cardinals 27–7. Drive: 3 plays, 44 yards, 1:39.

Third quarter

- ARI – Neil Rackers 33-yard field goal, 4:40. Cardinals 30–7. Drive: 6 plays, 11 yards, 3:12.

Fourth quarter

- ARI – Neil Rackers 20-yard field goal, 3:10. Cardinals 33–7. Drive: 13 plays, 48 yards, 7:37.
- CAR – Steve Smith 8-yard pass from Jake Delhomme (pass failed), 0:50. Cardinals 33–13. Drive: 10 plays, 79 yards, 2:20.

Top passers

- ARI – Kurt Warner – 21/32, 220 yards, 2 TD, INT
- CAR – Jake Delhomme – 17/34, 205 yards, TD, 5 INT

Top rushers

- ARI – Tim Hightower – 17 rushes, 76 yards
- CAR – DeAngelo Williams – 12 rushes, 63 yards

Top receivers

- ARI – Larry Fitzgerald – 8 receptions, 166 yards, TD
- CAR – Muhsin Muhammad – 5 receptions, 55 yards

Coming off their wild card home win over the Falcons, the Cardinals flew to Bank of America Stadium for the NFC Divisional round against the number 2 Carolina Panthers, in a rematch of their Week 8 contest. The Panthers came in 8–0 at home and the Cardinals were 0–5 on the East Coast.

Arizona would trail early in the first quarter as the Panthers Jonathan Stewart scored on a nine-yard touchdown run. The Cardinals would respond with quarterback Kurt Warner completing a three-yard touchdown pass to rookie Tim Hightower, followed by Edgerrin James' four-yard touchdown run. In the second quarter, Arizona took a larger lead as kicker Neil Rackers made a 49-yard and 30-yard field goal. Warner threw a 29-yard touchdown pass to Larry Fitzgerald.

The Cardinals would add onto their lead in the third quarter as Rackers made a 33-yard field goal. In the fourth quarter, Arizona would end its dominating night with Rackers kicking a 20-yard field goal. Carolina would end the game's scoring with Jake Delhomme's eight-yard touchdown pass to Steve Smith (with a failed two-point conversion.)

With this upset win, not only did the Cardinals improve their overall record to 11–7, but they also advanced to their first NFC Championship Game in franchise history.

Arizona's defense forced Delhomme into six turnovers (5 interceptions and 1 fumble), along with holding the Panthers' running back duo of DeAngelo Williams and Stewart to 74 combined rushing yards.

Fitzgerald (8 receptions and 1 touchdown) would set a franchise postseason record with 166 receiving yards. Anquan Boldin did not play due to a hamstring injury, but Fitzgerald was able to perform well in his absence.

With the win the Cardinals moved to 11–7.

==== NFC Championship: vs. (6) Philadelphia Eagles ====
NFC Championship: (6) Philadelphia Eagles at (4) Arizona Cardinals – Game summary

Quarter	1	2	3	4	Total
Eagles	3	3	13	6	25
Cardinals	7	17	0	8	32

at University of Phoenix Stadium, Glendale, Arizona

- Date: January 18, 2009
- Game time: 1:00 p.m. MST
- Game weather: None (retractable roof closed)
- Game attendance: 70,650
- Referee: Walt Anderson
- TV announcers (Fox): Joe Buck, Troy Aikman, Pam Oliver and Chris Myers
- Box Score

Game information

First quarter

- ARI – Larry Fitzgerald 9-yard pass from Kurt Warner (Neil Rackers kick), 9:20. Cardinals 7–0. Drive: 9 plays, 80 yards, 5:40.
- PHI – David Akers 45-yard field goal, 4:43. Cardinals 7–3. Drive: 8 plays, 33 yards, 4:37.

Second quarter

- ARI – Larry Fitzgerald 62-yard pass from Kurt Warner (Neil Rackers kick), 13:19. Cardinals 14–3. Drive: 1 play, 62 yards, 0:11.
- PHI – David Akers 33-yard field goal, 9:02. Cardinals 14–6. Drive: 7 plays, 65 yards, 4:17.
- ARI – Larry Fitzgerald 1-yard pass from Kurt Warner (Neil Rackers kick), 3:06. Cardinals 21–6. Drive: 9 plays, 73 yards, 5:56.
- ARI – Neil Rackers 49-yard field goal, 0:00. Cardinals 24–6. Drive: 9 plays, 53 yards, 1:31.

Third quarter

- PHI – Brent Celek 6-yard pass from Donovan McNabb (David Akers kick), 4:08. Cardinals 24–13. Drive: 13 plays, 90 yards, 5:59.
- PHI – Brent Celek 31-yard pass from Donovan McNabb (kick failed), 0:49. Cardinals 24–19. Drive: 6 plays, 61 yards, 2:39.

Fourth quarter

- PHI – DeSean Jackson 62-yard pass from Donovan McNabb (pass failed), 10:45. Eagles 25–24. Drive: 4 plays, 86 yards, 2:15.
- ARI – Tim Hightower 8-yard pass from Kurt Warner (Kurt Warner–Ben Patrick pass), 2:53. Cardinals 32–25. Drive: 14 plays, 72 yards, 7:52.

Top passers

- PHI – Donovan McNabb – 28/47, 375 yards, 3 TD, INT
- ARI – Kurt Warner – 21/28, 279 yards, 4 TD

Top rushers

- PHI – Brian Westbrook – 12 rushes, 45 yards
- ARI – Edgerrin James – 16 rushes, 73 yards

Top receivers

- PHI – Kevin Curtis – 4 receptions, 122 yards
- ARI – Larry Fitzgerald – 9 receptions, 152 yards, 3 TD

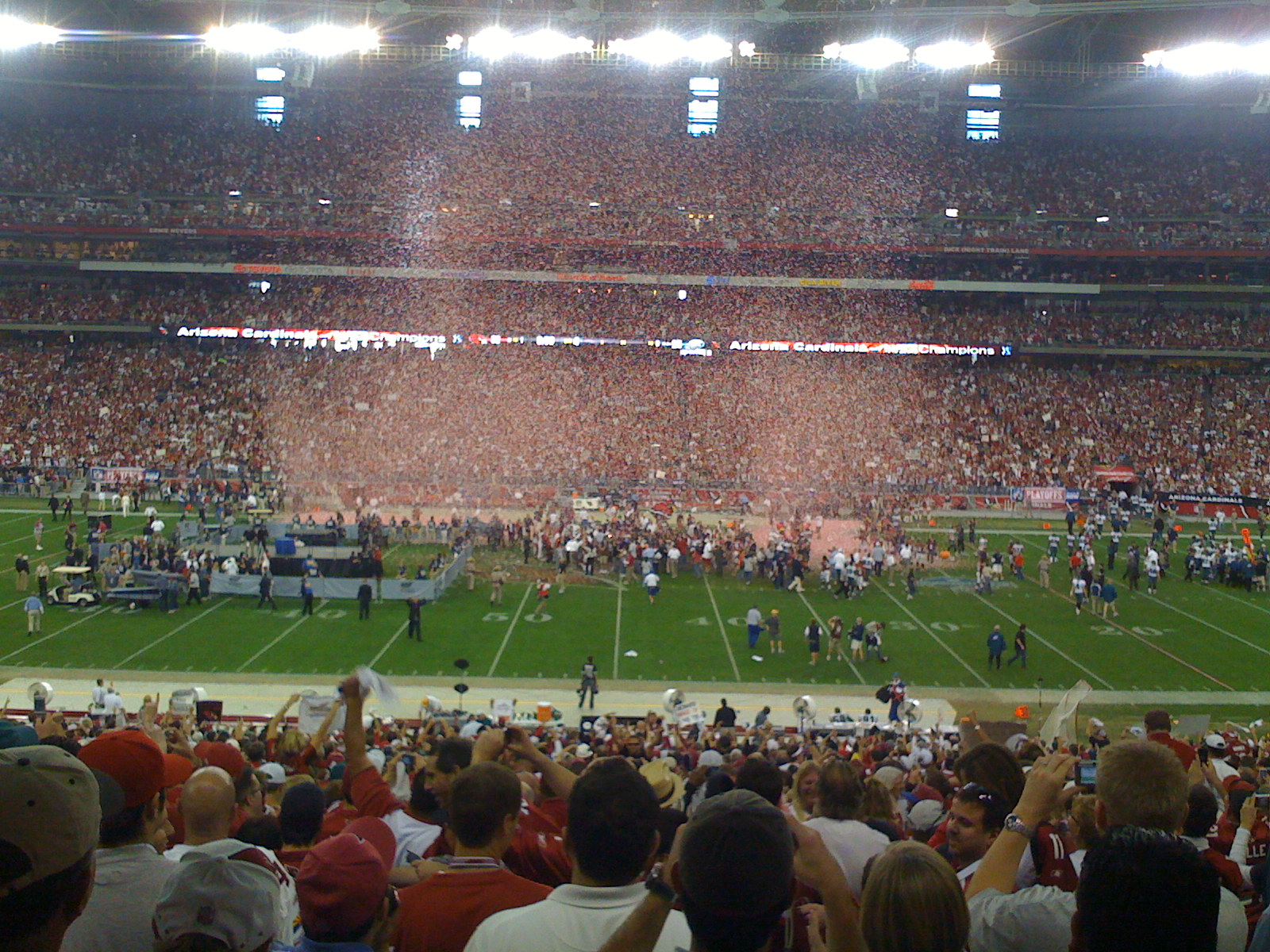
Celebration after Cardinals win NFC championship game, January 18, 2009.

Coming off their east-coast divisional road win over the Panthers, the Cardinals went home for the NFC Championship Game against the number 6 Philadelphia Eagles, who were coming off their victory over the number 1 New York Giants, in a rematch of their Thanksgiving game.

Arizona capped off the game's opening kickoff with a nine-yard touchdown pass from Kurt Warner to Larry Fitzgerald. The Eagles responded with kicker David Akers making a 45-yard field goal. With the score at 7–3, Akers missed a 47-yard field goal attempt, the first he missed in his last 20 attempts in the postseason, an NFL Record. The Cardinals answered in the second quarter as Warner threw a touchdown to Fitzgerald again on a flea-flicker, Warner to Arrington, back to Warner, who threw it to Fitzgerald for a 62-yard pass. Philadelphia struck back as Akers made a 33-yard field goal, but Arizona closed out the half with Warner's one-yard touchdown pass to Fitzgerald and kicker Neil Rackers' 49-yard field goal in the final seconds of the half to make the score 24–6.

The Eagles began to rally in the third quarter as quarterback Donovan McNabb completed 6-yard and a 31-yard touchdown passes to Brent Celek, with a failed PAT on the latter touchdown. In the fourth quarter, Philadelphia took the lead on 62-yard touchdown pass from McNabb to rookie DeSean Jackson. The Eagles went for the two-point conversion, hoping for a three-point lead, but failed, leaving the score 25–24. However, the Cardinals regained the lead when Warner completed an eight-yard touchdown pass to rookie Tim Hightower and a successful two-point conversion pass by Warner to Ben Patrick. The Arizona defense was able to prevent Philadelphia from making a comeback, as the Eagles drove to the Arizona 47, but then McNabb threw four straight incompletions to turn the ball over on downs. The Cardinals went three and out on the next possession, giving the Eagles only seven seconds in the game. However the Eagles were unable to score on a 93-yard hook and ladder play, after McNabb completed to Jackson, who attempted to lateral, but the lateral was picked off by defensive lineman Darnell Dockett.

The Cardinals improved their overall record to 12–7, and also won their first National Football Conference crown, allowing them to advance to their first Super Bowl appearance in franchise history. They became the first team since the 1979 Los Angeles Rams to finish the regular season with 9 wins and make it to the Super Bowl.

Fitzgerald had a stellar performance with 152 yards and three of Arizona's four touchdowns and setting a new postseason record with 419 receiving yards, surpassing the prior record set by Jerry Rice in 1988.

==== Super Bowl XLIII: vs. (A2) Pittsburgh Steelers ====
Super Bowl XLIII: (A2) Pittsburgh Steelers vs. (N4) Arizona Cardinals – Game summary

Quarter	1	2	3	4	Total
Steelers	3	14	3	7	27
Cardinals	0	7	0	16	23

at Raymond James Stadium, Tampa, Florida

- Date: February 1, 2009
- Game time: 6:30 p.m. EST/4:30 p.m. MST
- Game weather: Mostly Cloudy, 66 °F (19 °C)
- Game attendance: 70,774
- Referee: Terry McAulay
- TV announcers (NBC): Al Michaels, John Madden, Andrea Kremer and Alex Flanagan
- Box Score

Game information

First quarter

- PIT – Jeff Reed 18-yard field goal, 9:45. Steelers 3–0. Drive: 9 plays, 71 yards, 5:15.

Second quarter

- PIT – Gary Russell 1-yard run, 14:01. Steelers 10–0. Drive: 11 plays, 69 yards, 7:12.
- ARI – Ben Patrick 1-yard pass from Kurt Warner (Neil Rackers kick), 8:34. Steelers 10–7. Drive: 9 plays, 83 yards, 5:27.
- PIT – James Harrison 100-yard interception return (Jeff Reed kick), 0:00. Steelers 17–7.

Third quarter

- PIT – Jeff Reed 21-yard field goal, 2:11. Steelers 20–7. Drive: 16 plays, 79 yards, 8:39.

Fourth quarter

- ARI – Larry Fitzgerald 1-yard pass from Kurt Warner (Neil Rackers kick), 7:33. Steelers 20–14. Drive: 8 plays, 87 yards, 3:57.
- ARI – Team safety, 2:58. Steelers 20–16.
- ARI – Larry Fitzgerald 64-yard pass from Kurt Warner (Neil Rackers kick), 2:37. Cardinals 23–20. Drive: 2 plays, 64 yards, 0:21.
- PIT – Santonio Holmes 6-yard pass from Ben Roethlisberger (Jeff Reed kick), 0:35. Steelers 27–23. Drive: 8 plays, 78 yards, 2:02.

Top passers

- PIT – Ben Roethlisberger – 21/30, 256 yards, TD, INT
- ARI – Kurt Warner – 31/43, 377 yards, 3 TD, INT

Top rushers

- PIT – Willie Parker – 19 rushes, 53 yards
- ARI – Edgerrin James – 9 rushes, 33 yards

Top receivers

- PIT – Santonio Holmes – 9 receptions, 131 yards, TD
- ARI – Larry Fitzgerald – 7 receptions, 127 yards, 2 TD

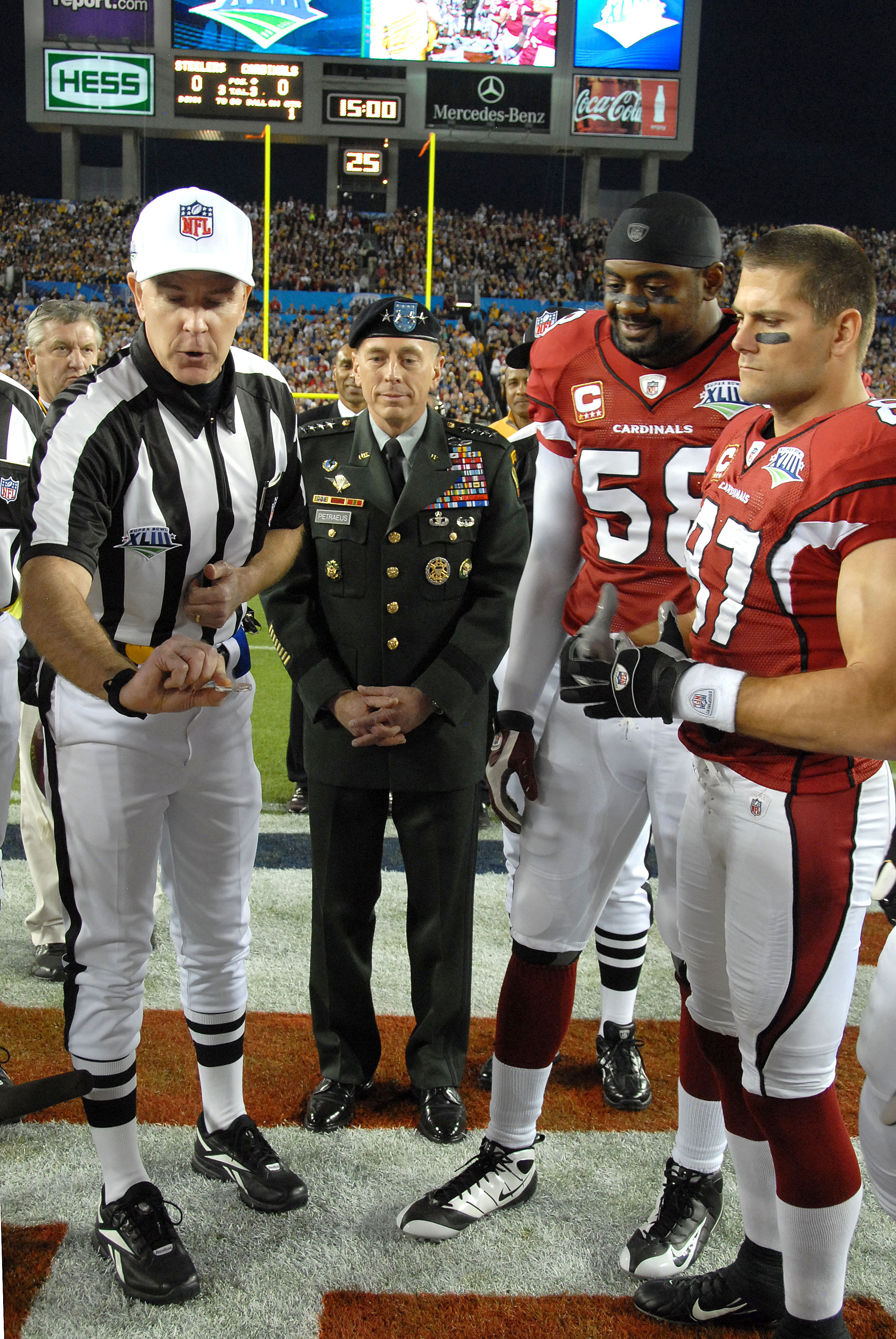
Coin flip before SB XLIII

Two weeks following their NFC Championship victory over the Eagles, the Cardinals flew to Tampa, Florida for their Super Bowl XLIII duel with the AFC Champion Pittsburgh Steelers at Raymond James Stadium. Arizona would trail early in the first quarter as Steelers kicker Jeff Reed kicked an 18-yard field goal. The Steelers would add onto their lead as Gary Russell ran for a one-yard touchdown. The Cardinals would answer with quarterback Kurt Warner completing a one-yard touchdown pass to Ben Patrick. Arizona came close to scoring again nearing the end of the half, but Pittsburgh linebacker James Harrison returned an interception 100 yards for a touchdown.

The Steelers would increase their lead in the third quarter as Reed converted a 21-yard field goal. In the fourth quarter, the Cardinals would take the lead as Warner completed a one-yard touchdown pass to Larry Fitzgerald, Steelers center Justin Hartwig being called for holding in his own endzone (giving Arizona a safety), and Warner threw to Fitzgerald again on a 64-yard touchdown pass. However, Pittsburgh responded with quarterback Ben Roethlisberger completing a six-yard touchdown pass to wide receiver Santonio Holmes. The Cardinals tried to come back, but the Steelers' defense forced a fumble to seal the win.

With the loss, Arizona closed out their season with an overall record of 12–8.
