= Clovis High School (California) =

School in Fresno County, California, US

Location
- 1055 Fowler Ave. Clovis, Fresno County, CA 93611; United States; 36°49′03″N 119°40′48″W

Information
- Established: 1899
- School district: Clovis Unified School District
- Principal: Matt Lucas
- Teaching staff: 139.18 (FTE)
- Grades: 9th - 12th
- Enrollment: 2,876 (2023-2024)
- Student to teacher ratio: 20.66
- Colors: Blue, Gold
- Mascot: Cougar
- Rival: Clovis West
- Newspaper: The Cougar's Growl
- Feeder schools: Clark Intermediate School
- Website: Clovis High School

Clovis High School is a four-year high school founded in 1899. The school's current campus, located at 1055 Fowler Avenue in Clovis, California, United States, opened in 1969.

== History ==
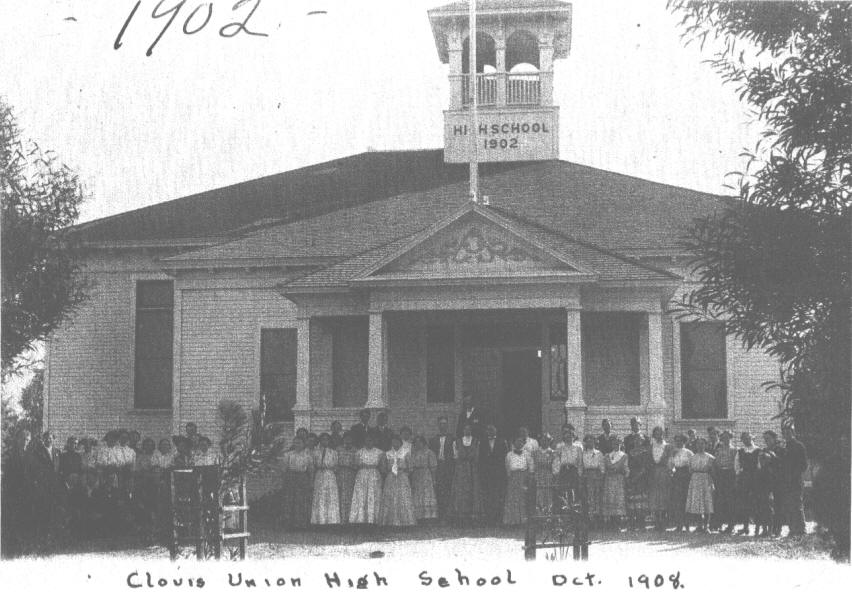
Clovis High School, 1908

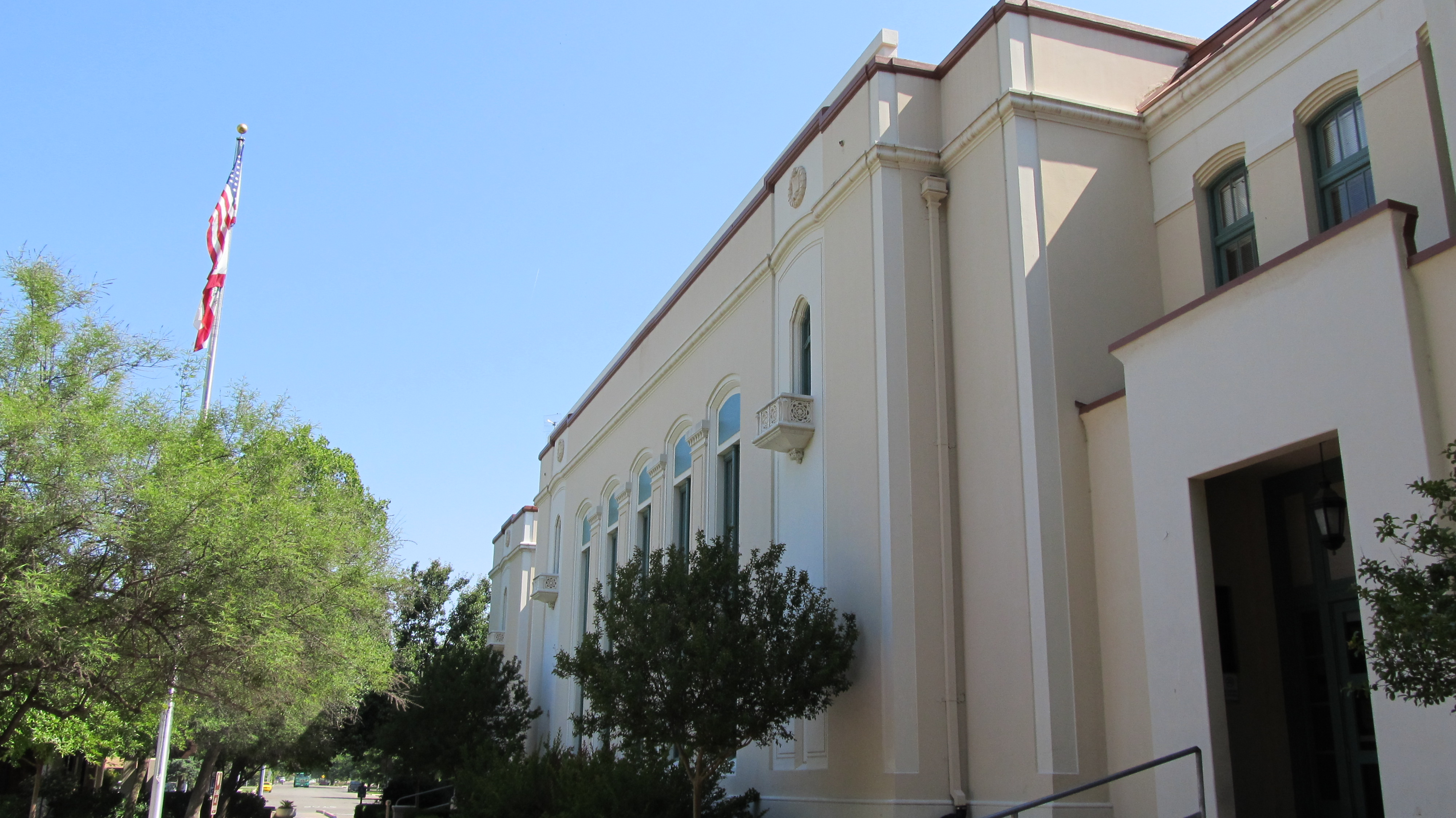
San Joaquin College of Law, housed in the restored old Clovis High Building.

From the book Images of an Age: "Community members tried unsuccessfully to form a high school district as early as 1889. At the time, families sent their sons to Santa Clara or Stockton to schools beyond eighth grade. Daughters went to San Jose, if they went at all. Then, on June 6, 1899, Lee Beal, a Jefferson Colony Farmer, and John Rutledge, a Clovis millman, led seven school districts to join in formation of one high school district. Each of the seven elected one trustee to the board. The school was named Clovis High School, although it was the union of Red Banks, Jefferson Colony, Garfield Colony, Mississippi Settlement, Wolters Colony, Temperance Colony, and Clovis. Seventeen high school students enrolled in classes at the Clovis school. Louis K. Webb, principal and teacher, received $120 per month. Estelle Kellogg joined the staff in September. Two students, Emory Reyburn and R.E.L. Browne, graduated in the first class of 1902. A separate Clovis High School was financed by bonds in 1903, east of the railroad track between Fourth and Fifth Streets. It was replaced in 1918."

In 1920, Clovis High School moved into new facilities on Fifth Street built by William Weeks. The High School remained in that building until 1969, when it moved to its current facilities on Fowler Avenue. The building on Fifth Street gradually fell into a state of disrepair, despite its historical significance for the Clovis Community. This unique building had churrigueresque arches which were patterned after the detailed baroque architecture of Spain in the late 17th and early 18th centuries. These arches were taken down by State mandate after the 1952 Kern County earthquake for safety reasons. In 1995, San Joaquin College of Law met with city leaders and negotiated a deal to bring the Law School, which was founded in 1969, to Clovis from its Fresno site. This resulted in a multimillion-dollar renovation which not only preserved the historic exterior of the building, but also preserved and reclaimed many of its unique and historic interior features.

== Statistics ==
In the 2006–07 school year, Clovis High School had an enrollment of 2,518, which has probably increased, and an average class size between 22 and 33 people.

The graduation rate in 2005–06 was 94.4%.

In 2008, Clovis High's API rating increased to 803, and has set a goal of gaining 10 more points to reach an API of 813.

== Campus and facilities ==
The current Clovis High campus opened in 1969. It has a library media center, choir and lecture halls, and a drama room constructed as a small black box theater.

The campus has two gymnasiums, tennis courts (resurfaced in 2019), an aquatics center, baseball field (Merriman Field), and Lamonica Stadium, which is shared with Clovis East High School.

The Aquatics Center was dedicated to former coach and teacher Jim Coiner on November 5, 2008.

When asked to grade how well the buildings and grounds are maintained at their child's school, 78% of parents rated the grounds as “good” to “excellent”.

The campus is relatively technologically advanced, with a total of 349 computers, not all of which are available to students (most student-used computers are housed in the library and the computer lab), and 121 classrooms with internet.

Recently, CHS was awarded a Career Technical Grant to create a construction careers pathway and new facilities.

== Staff ==
As of November 2024, the school's principal is Matthew Lucas.

According to students from Clovis High, 4 teachers have been arrested between 2010-2023.

== Athletics ==
Clovis High School is a part of the TRAC, or Tri-River Athletic Conference

== Extracurricular and co-curricular activities ==
In 1983, the marching band traveled to Whitewater, Wisconsin, and won second place in the Bands of America Grand National Championship, missing first place in the nation by only one-tenth of a point. The band traveled to Washington, DC, for the annual Cherry Blossom Festival in 1977, and was one of only two high school bands chosen to march in Ronald Reagan's inaugural parade in January 1981. The marching band also performed in the 1984 Tournament of Roses Parade. In 2015 and 2016, the Clovis High Indoor Percussion Ensemble traveled to Dayton, Ohio to participate in the Winter Guard International World Championships.

Clovis High's Odyssey of the Mind team won 6th place in the world competition in 1989 and in 2002 won 10th place in the Destination Imagination (changed from Odyssey of the Mind) in the Global Competition.

== Publications ==
The Cougar's Growl, Clovis High's student-produced newspaper, comes out eight times a year, and has won the International First Place Award in the Quill and Scroll News Media Evaluation, 2007–2008.

The Cavalcade is Clovis High School's student-produced yearbook, and has existed for almost 100 years.

== Notable alumni ==
- Ryan Beatty, singer-songwriter, collaborated with Tyler, the Creator, and BROCKHAMPTON
- Mike Briggs, Fresno City Councilmember, state legislator, talk show host
- Tyler Clutts, pro football player for the Dallas Cowboys
- Ryan Cook, professional baseball player for the Boston Red Sox
- Johnny Estrada, all-star, pro baseball player
- Zack Follett, professional football player
- Mark Gardner, pro baseball player, bullpen coach for the San Francisco Giants
- Aaron Hill, TV and movie actor
- Josh Hokit, mixed martial artist
- Ryan Kenny, pro soccer player
- Daryle Lamonica, NFL Raiders quarterback (lived in Fresno while attending Clovis High)
- Dave Lewis, pro football player
- Chad McCarty, pro soccer player, Olympian
- Lloyd Merriman, professional baseball player
- Keith Poole, pro football player
- Jenna Prandini, USA Olympian, sprinting
- Gio Scelzi, racecar driver
- Kate Scott, sportscaster, play-by-play announcer for the Philadelphia 76ers
- Stephen Spach, pro football player for the St. Louis Rams
- Matt Spaeth, pro football player
- Damon Thomas, pro football player

== Faculty, staff, or administrators ==
- Jim Criner, college football coach
- Steve Wapnick, pro baseball player
- Dick Selma, pro baseball player
