= Memorial High School (Victoria, Texas) =

- 1110 Sam Houston Dr. Victoria, TX 77901

Information
- Type: Public
- Established: 2000
- Closed: 2010
- Principal: Greg Crockett
- Faculty: 621 (January 2007)
- Enrollment: 4,009 (January 2007)
- Website: http://www.visd.com/

Memorial High School, which served as the high school for Victoria Independent School District, was formed in 2000 as a result of the consolidation of Victoria High School (VHS) and Stroman High School. The Senior Campus was warned by the state due to a high dropout rate in 2004. The warning was removed the following year when the attendance leveled. The school closed after the 2009–10 school year, when it was split into two new campuses known as Victoria East and Victoria West.

== Campus ==
Memorial HS was a Class 5A school that served the needs of 3,500+ students. The old Stroman campus housed the freshmen and sophomores while the old VHS campus housed the juniors and seniors. The school mascot was the Vipers and school colors were black, blue, silver, and white.

In 2007, Victoria ISD announced plans to purchase four pieces of land around Victoria for new campuses. Construction of two new high school campuses, one serving the east side of the district, the other serving the west side of the district, was completed in 2009. As a result, Memorial High School was split into two separate campuses, Victoria East and Victoria West. Memorial High School closed it doors at the end of the 2009–10 school year.

== Student activities and awards ==
The Memorial High School Marching Band had a perfect record of a First Division at UIL Marching Contest since the consolidation. In 2002, they made it to the UIL state round of competition where they placed 23 out of 25. This showing was the first in VISD history for any high school band program. The 2004 Memorial High School Percussion Ensemble won first place in the Percussive Arts Society's "Call for Tapes" competition. More than twenty percussionists were invited to perform a showcase concert at the Percussive Arts Society International Convention in November, 2004 where they commissioned pieces by various internationally acclaimed composers.

The Memorial Cheerleaders were the 2000, 2001 and 2006 UCA Cheerleading National Champions and were congressionally commended for their national performance. The Memorial High School Dance and Drill team were eight-time National Champions. The UIL Academic team won the Region IV 5A championship in 2005. The Memorial UIL Current Issues and Events, Social Studies, Computer Science, Number Sense, and Mathematics teams all won first place in District 27-5A in 2007. The Computer Science team won first place in Region IV-5A the same year, advancing to State. Jose Aguirre from Memorial High School won the UIL 5A Social Studies State Championship in 2007.

The Memorial High School tennis team were the team tennis district champs in 2000 and 2001 and some of its players were singles and doubles, men's and women's, individual district champs in 2001 and 2002. The Vipers girls golf team were Region IV Champions for 2006 and state finalist and were also the state champions for 2004. Colin Hoover became to first Viper to win a State Tennis Title for Boys' Singles.

The Memorial High School Speech Theatre and Debate team were the district champs 2008.

== Notable alumni ==
- Noël Wells, comedian, actress, and musician Saturday Night Live
- Jon Guerra, actor, and formal collegiate athlete Texas Tech Red Raiders
