= Tri-River League =

High school athletic league in California

Tri-River Athletic Conference
- Current season, competition or edition: 2024
- Sport: Football
- First season: 1996
- No. of teams: 6
- Most recent champion: Clovis East (2024)
- Most titles: Clovis West (9)

The Tri-River Athletic Conference (TRAC) is a high school athletic league that is part of the CIF Central Section. All of the members are major public high schools in Fresno County, California. The name derives from the three major rivers found in the Central Valley: the Fresno, Kings, and San Joaquin Rivers.

== TRAC Football History ==
The Tri-River Athletic Conference was formed before the 1996-97 school year when the Central Section broke up the Northeast and Northwest Yosemite Leagues, in large part due to Fresno Unified schools not being able to compete with the Clovis Unified juggernaut. Original members of the TRAC include: Buchanan, Central, Clovis, Clovis West, Madera, and Sanger.

For two seasons (2002 and 2003), the TRAC was split up into two separate conferences, the Tri-River and Tri-City. The Tri-River consisted of Central, Clovis, Clovis East, and Hoover. Meanwhile, the Tri-City was made up by Buchanan, Bullard, Clovis West, and Madera.

- Buchanan has eight TRAC championships to their name, with the first coming in 1997.
- Central is the first team to win back-to-back outright TRAC titles. Central's first TRAC championship came in the form of a 3-way tie with Clovis and Clovis West back in 2001.
- Clovis won the first ever TRAC title in 1996 after going 5-0 in conference play. Clovis has racked up seven TRAC titles in all, including three since 2011 under former Head Coach, Rich Hammond. When Hammond led Clovis to a co-championship in 2011, he ended the Cougars worst drought in their history. Clovis had never gone more than five years without a conference title since 1970.
- Clovis East's rise into a section powerhouse was unprecedented. In the T-Wolves first season playing varsity football (2001), the school met Liberty in the D-III title game, eventually falling 25-13. Joining their Clovis brethren in D-I the following year, Clovis East would win six TRAC titles from 2002-2008. The Timberwolves are restoring pride to their once proud program after going 0-40 in TRAC play from 2010-2017.
- Clovis North is the newest member of the TRAC, joining in 2011. The Broncos have won three titles since joining.
- Clovis West has the honor of holding the title of most TRAC championships. Since 1998, Clovis West has won eleven conference titles. However, two of those ten were won in the Tri-City Athletic Conference.

== Members ==
High School	Mascot	Colors	Joined	TRAC titles	Section titles
Buchanan	Bears		1996	8	1
Sanger	Apaches		2026	0	0
Clovis	Cougars		1996	7	8
Clovis East	Timberwolves		2002	7	2
Clovis North	Broncos		2011	3	3*
Clovis West	Golden Eagles		1996	9	9
Central East	Bengals		1996	7	4

*Clovis North's first Valley championship was won in D-II

== Football Championships by Year ==
A TRAC championship is won by the team with the best league record at the end of the regular season. A championship can be shared by multiple teams, commonly referred to as a co-championship, if they have the same league record at the end of the regular season.

Year	Champion(s)	TRAC Record	OVR. Record*	Playoff Result
2024	Clovis East	5-0	12-1	Valley runner-up
2023	Clovis North	5-0	10-0	Valley Champs
2022	Clovis West	4-1	9-1	Elim. 3rd Rd
2021	Buchanan	5-0	9-1	Elim. 2nd Rd
2020 (Spring 2021)	Buchanan	5-0	5-0	No playoffs (COVID-19)
2019	Central	5-0	10-0	State Champs
2018	Central	5-0	10-0	Valley Champs
2017	Central	5-0	9-1	Valley Champs
2016	Central	5-0	9-1	Valley runner-up
2015	Buchanan, Clovis	4-1, 4-1	7-3, 9-1	Elim. 2nd Rd, Valley runner-up
2014	Clovis North	5-0	7-3	Elim. 2nd Rd
2013	Central, Clovis North	4-1, 4-1	7-3, 8-2	Elim. 3rd Rd, Valley runner-up
2012	Clovis	5-0	9-1	Elim. 2nd Rd
2011	Central, Clovis	4-1, 4-1	8-2, 9-1	Elim. 2nd Rd, Elim. 3rd Rd
2010	Clovis West	5-0	9-1	Valley Champs
2009	Buchanan	5-0	10-0	Elim. 2nd Rd
2008	Buchanan, Clovis East, Clovis West	4-1, 4-1, 4-1	8-2, 7-3, 7-3	Elim. 2nd Rd, Valley runner-up, Valley Champs
2007	Buchanan, Clovis East, Clovis West	4-1, 4-1, 4-1	6-4, 7-3, 6-3-1	Elim. 2nd Rd, Elim. 2nd Rd, Valley runner-up
2006	Clovis East, Clovis West	4-1, 4-1	9-1, 8-2	Valley Champs, Valley runner-up
2005	Clovis East	5-0	9-1	Elim. 2nd Rd
2004	Clovis West	5-0	8-2	Valley Champs
2003	Clovis East	3-0	9-1	Valley Champs
2002	Clovis, Clovis East	2-1, 2-1	8-2, 8-2	Valley Champs, Elim. 1st Rd
2001	Central, Clovis, Clovis West	3-1, 3-1, 3-1	7-3, 8-2, 6-2-1	Elim. 2nd Rd, Valley runner-up, Elim. 2nd Rd
2000	Buchanan	4-0	9-1	Valley Champs
1999	Clovis, Clovis West	4-1, 4-1	9-1, 9-1	Valley Champs, Valley runner-up
1998	Clovis West	5-0	9-1	Valley Champs
1997	Buchanan	5-0	10-0	Elim. 3rd Rd
1996	Clovis	5-0	9-1	Valley runner-up

Tri-City Athletic Conference Champions
Year	Champion(s)	TCAC Record	OVR. Record*	Playoff Result
2003	Clovis West	3-0	9-0-1	Valley runner-up
2002	Buchanan, Clovis West	2-0-1, 2-0-1	8-1-1, 4-5-1	Elim. 1st Rd, Valley runner-up

*denotes record after regular season

== Football Championships by School (All-time) ==
School	Conference	Section	State
Buchanan	1995 (NEYL) 1997 (TRAC) 2000 (TRAC) 2002 (TCAC) 2007 (TRAC) 2008 (TRAC) 2009 (TRAC) 2015 (TRAC) 2020 (TRAC) 2021 (TRAC)	2000 (Yosemite, Large)	
Central	1948 (NSL) 1960 (NSL) 1973 (NSL) 1978 (CSL) 1984 (CSL) 1988 (CSL) 1993 (CSL) 2001 (TRAC) 2011 (TRAC) 2013 (TRAC) 2016 (TRAC) 2017 (TRAC) 2018 (TRAC) 2019 (TRAC)	2017 (D-I) 2018 (D-I) 2019 (D-I) 2024 (D-1AA)	2019 (Division 1-AA)
Clovis	1923 (North Fresno) 1941 (Shasta) 1946 (Shasta) 1956 (NSL) 1970 (NYL) 1974 (NYL) 1979 (NYL) 1980 (NYL) 1984 (NYL) 1987 (NYL) 1988 (NYL) 1989 (NYL) 1990 (NYL) 1991 (NYL) 1994 (NEYL) 1996 (TRAC) 1999 (TRAC) 2001 (TRAC) 2002 (TRAC) 2011 (TRAC) 2012 (TRAC) 2015 (TRAC)	1970 (Yosemite) 1974 (Yosemite) 1979 (Yosemite) 1984 (Yosemite) 1991 (Yosemite) 1997 (Yosemite) 1999 (Yosemite, Large) 2002 (Yosemite, Large)	
Clovis East	2002 (TRAC) 2003 (TRAC) 2005 (TRAC) 2006 (TRAC) 2007 (TRAC) 2008 (TRAC) 2024 (TRAC)	2003 (Yosemite, Large) 2006 (D-I)	
Clovis North	2013 (TRAC) 2014 (TRAC) 2023 (TRAC)	2011 (D-II) 2012 (D-I) 2023 (D-I)	
Clovis West	1983 (NYL) 1985 (NYL) 1987 (NYL) 1990 (NYL) 1992 (NYL) 1993 (NYL) 1994 (NWYL) 1995 (NWYL) 1998 (TRAC) 1999 (TRAC) 2001 (TRAC) 2002 (TCAC) 2003 (TCAC) 2004 (TRAC) 2006 (TRAC) 2007 (TRAC) 2008 (TRAC) 2010 (TRAC) 2022 (TRAC)	1985 (Yosemite) 1987 (Yosemite) 1992 (Yosemite) 1993 (Yosemite) 1995 (Yosemite) 1998 (Yosemite, Large) 2004 (D-I) 2008 (D-I) 2010 (D-I)	
