= Stroman High School =

Location
- 3002 East North Street; Victoria, Texas 77901; Texas; USA
- 28°47′44″N 96°58′29″W

Information
- Type: Public Middle School
- Established: 1967
- School district: Victoria Independent School District
- Grades: 9-12
- Colors: Blue & Gold
- Slogan: "Once a Raider, Always a Raider"
- Athletics conference: UIL 5A
- Mascot: Rowdy Raider
- Yearbook: Roundup
- Website: www.visd.com

Victoria Stroman High School served as a high school for the Victoria Independent School District in Victoria, Texas, United States from 1967 to 2000, when it consolidated with Victoria High School to become Memorial High School. Due to the district's changes in 2010, the old campus is now used as Stroman Middle School.

== History ==
In 1898, with the creation of Victoria ISD, Victoria joined other Texas towns in establishing public education. Central High School (later called Mitchell and currently Mitchell Guidance Center) became the first public school for white students in 1900. Negro High School (renamed F.W. Gross High School in 1925 and currently F.W. Gross Montessori School) became the first public school for African American students in 1901. While Brown v. Board of Education determined segregation in public schools was unconstitutional in 1954, Victoria didn't start integrating schools until 1958. In 1957, Victoria High School opened its doors, but it did not become the first integrated high school in Victoria until 1961. F.W. Gross graduated its last class in 1966, closing its doors for Stroman to open in 1967.

The VISD Board of Trustees named the high school after O.C. Stroman, affectionately called “the father of Victoria tennis.” By his retirement in 1964, Stroman had the longest tenure of any teacher in the Victoria public school system. He served as a tennis coach from 1932 to 1964, and he died in 1965.

In 1991, VISD started serious discussion about overcrowding and ethnic enrollment pattern imbalances at Victoria and Stroman high schools. Victoria citizens strongly opposed losing Stroman High School to proposed restructuring of the schools, and the trustees voted in favor of keeping Stroman during that time. The issues resurfaced in 1999, and with multiple options on the table, the trustees determined it was time to plan for a consolidation of the two high schools. In 2000, the two schools were consolidated into Memorial High School, with Victoria High becoming the Senior Campus (juniors and seniors) and Stroman High becoming the Stroman Campus (freshmen and sophomores). In 2006, sophomores were moved to the Senior Campus.

In 2010, Memorial High School closed, and the Stroman Campus became Stroman Middle School. Stroman is now part of the East Learning Center, feeding into Victoria East High School. Stroman Middle School's feeder schools are Dudley Gifted and Talented Magnet Elementary School, O’Connor Magnet Elementary School, Smith Magnet Elementary School, and Torres Elementary School.

== Extracurricular activities ==
=== Fine arts, clubs, and organizations ===
- AFJROTC
- Art Club
- Ballet Folklorico
- Business Professionals of America (BPA)
- Cheerleading
- Choir
- Color Guard (Flags)
- Debate
- Distribution Education Clubs of America (DECA)
- Drama Club
- Future Educators of America
- Future Farmers of America (FFA)
- Key Club
- Marching Band
- UIL Marching Band
- Concert Band
- UIL Concert Band
- Mariachi Caballeros
- National Honor Society
- Peer-Assistant Leadership (PALs)
- Physics Club
- Raiderbelles (Dance Team)
- Reaching Every Student Quickly and Successfully (RESQS)
- Stroman Hispanic Youth Organization (SHYO)
- Student Council
- Vocational Industrial Clubs of America (VICA)
- World Scholars
- Viper Hiphop (Dance Team)
- Yearbook
- Youth Opposed to Using (YOU)

==== Ballet Folklorico ====
Created in 1999, Ballet Folklorico was a group with ten or more members that focused heavily on Hispanic heritage and tradition in as it related to dance. They performed mostly at local events and were involved with the community.

==== Mariachi Caballeros ====
Created in 1997 as Stroman's mariachi band, Mariachi Caballeros was made of around 30 student members who performed at local events and competed against other mariachi groups from all over Texas. The mariachi group started its first class in late 1999.

=== Athletics ===
- Baseball
- Basketball
- Cheerleading
- Cross Country
- Football
- Viperetes (Dance Team)
- Soccer
- Tennis
- Track
- Volleyball
- Viper hiphop (Dance Team)

==== Achievements ====
- The Stroman Raider baseball team won the Texas UIL State 5A Championship for the 1984–1985 school year.

== Notable alumni ==
- John Barefield, 1973, former NFL player
- Blaine Beatty, Major League Baseball (MLB) pitcher
- Ron Gant, 1983, MLB outfielder and second baseman
- Justin Lucas, 1994, former NFL player
- Jerheme Urban, 1999, NFL wide-receiver, attended Trinity University
- Darron Cardosa, 1985, Best selling author & noted hospitality industry expert
