= Clovis East High School =

Public high school in California, United States

- 2940 Leonard Avenue; Clovis, California 93619; United States

Information
- Type: Public
- Established: 1999
- School district: Clovis Unified School District
- Principal: Ryan Eisele
- Teaching staff: 129.84 (FTE)
- Grades: 9 to 12
- Enrollment: 2,923 (2023-2024)
- Student to teacher ratio: 22.51
- Colors: Kelly green, navy blue, and silver
- Athletics conference: CIF Central Section – TRAC
- Mascot: Timberwolves
- Nickname: CEHS
- Website: cehs.cusd.com

Clovis East High School is a four-year public high school of Clovis Unified School District located in Clovis, California, United States. It is home to the Timberwolves. It was built in 2000, but first welcomed students in 1999, sharing a campus with Reyburn Intermediate School.

It was named a California Distinguished School in 2007, and was named a Blue Ribbon School in 2008.

== Athletics ==
The boys' Clovis East track and field team won the 2009 CIF State Championship.

== Notable alumni ==
- Chris Colfer, singer, actor, and author
- Bryson DeChambeau, professional golfer, PGA Tour
- Derek Ernst, professional golfer, PGA Tour
