= Brandon Keith =

American football player (born 1984)

No. 72
- Position: Tackle

Personal information
- Born: November 21, 1984 (age 41); Silsbee, Texas, U.S.
- Listed height: 6 ft 5 in (1.96 m)
- Listed weight: 338 lb (153 kg)

Career information
- High school: McAlester (McAlester, Oklahoma)
- College: Northern Iowa
- NFL draft: 2008: 7th round, 225th overall pick

Career history
- Arizona Cardinals (2008–2011); Minnesota Vikings (2013)*
- * Offseason or practice squad member only

Awards and highlights
- Second-team NJCAA All-American (2004); Third-team All-American (2007); First-team All-Gateway (2007)

Career NFL statistics
- Games played: 24
- Games started: 18
- Stats at Pro Football Reference

Brandon Latrel Keith (born November 21, 1984) is an American former professional football player who was an offensive tackle for the Arizona Cardinals of the National Football League (NFL). He played college football for the Northern Iowa Panthers. Keith was selected by the Cardinals in the seventh round of the 2008 NFL draft. He was also a member of the Minnesota Vikings.

== Early life ==
Keith attended McAlester High School in McAlester, Oklahoma, where tallied over 70 pancake blocks earned first-team all-state honors from the Daily Oklahoman and the Tulsa World as a senior in 2002.

Considered a four-star recruit by Rivals.com, Keith was rated as the No. 20 offensive tackle in the nation. He committed to the University of Oklahoma, but did not qualify academically, and eventually headed for junior college.

== College career ==
After redshirting his first year at Northeastern Oklahoma A&M College, Keith received first-team all-Southwest League honors and second-team NJCAA All-American in 2004. Honoring his commitment to the Sooners, Keith was a member of the 2005 Oklahoma Sooners football team but did not see action. Unsatisfied with his role, he decided to transfer to the University of Northern Iowa.

Keith saw action in seven games for the Panthers, and started two. He missed four games with a bone bruise in his right knee. Keith was part of the offense ranked No. 11 in the nation in scoring (31.0 points/game) in 2006.

In 2007, Keith started 11 games at right tackle, helping to guide the Panthers to a perfect 11–0 regular season and a No. 1 national ranking for six weeks. He received Associated Press All-America third-team honors and was named an honorable mention All-American by The Sports Network.

== Professional career ==
Despite impressive showings at Northern Iowa's Pro Day, where he ran a sub-5.0 40-yard dash at 345 pounds, Keith was not regarded as one of the top offensive tackles in the draft, due to his unpolished footwork and lack of consistency. He was selected in the seventh round with the 225th overall pick by the Arizona Cardinals.

Pre-draft measurables
Height	Weight	40-yard dash	10-yard split	20-yard split	20-yard shuttle	Three-cone drill	Vertical jump	Broad jump	Bench press
6 ft 5 1/4 in (1.96 m)	343 lb (156 kg)	5.27 s	1.90 s	3.06 s	4.84 s	7.91 s	26 in (0.66 m)	9 ft 5 in (2.87 m)	31 reps
Broad jump, shuttle, cone drill from Pro Day; all other values from NFL Combine.

After signing with the Minnesota Vikings on May 6, 2013, Keith was released by the Vikings on August 31, 2013 (along with 18 others) to get to a 53-man roster.

== Coaching career ==
He coaches at Salt River High School in the Salt River Pima Indian County.
