= Jerheme Urban =

American football player and coach (born 1980)

Trinity University (TX) Tigers
- Title: Head coach

Personal information
- Born: November 26, 1980 (age 45); Victoria, Texas, U.S.
- Listed height: 6 ft 3 in (1.91 m)
- Listed weight: 212 lb (96 kg)

Career information
- High school: Stroman (Victoria, Texas)
- College: Trinity (TX)
- NFL draft: 2003: undrafted

Career history

Playing
- Seattle Seahawks (2003–2005); Dallas Cowboys (2006–2007)*; Arizona Cardinals (2007–2009); Kansas City Chiefs (2010–2011)
- * Offseason or practice squad member only

Coaching
- Trinity (TX) (2012) Defensive backs coach; Trinity (TX) (2013) Offensive coordinator; Trinity (TX) (2014–present) Head coach

Awards and highlights
- 3× All-SCAC (2000, 2001, 2002)

Career NFL statistics
- Games played: 53
- Receptions: 91
- Receiving yards: 1,266
- Receiving touchdowns: 8
- Stats at Pro Football Reference

Head coaching record
- Regular season: 86–27 (.761)
- Postseason: 3–5 (.375)
- Career: 89–32 (.736)

Jerheme Wayne Urban (born November 26, 1980) is an American college football coach and former wide receiver. He is the head football coach for Trinity University, a position he had held since 2014. Urban played college football at Trinity and professionally in the National Football League (NFL) with the Seattle Seahawks, Arizona Cardinals, and Kansas City Chiefs. He was signed by the Seahawks as an undrafted free agent in 2003.

== Early life ==
Urban attended Stroman High School, where he competed in football and track. He then attended Trinity University San Antonio, an NCAA Division III school with the intent to play football and compete on the track and field team. As a freshman, he broke his left hand and was moved from quarterback to wide receiver. As a senior, he led the team with 75 receptions for 1,274 yards and 19 touchdowns. He contributed to the team reaching the Amos Alonzo Stagg Bowl, the NCAA Division III Football Championship game. Urban holds the school career record for touchdowns (40) and kickoff return yards. He set-single season school records for all-purpose yards, most touchdowns (19), and most touchdowns scored.

In track, he captured 16 conference championships and became the first person in Southern Collegiate Athletic Conference history to receive Male Track and Field Athlete of the Year four years in a row. He also set school or conference records in the 100 metres, 400 metres, 400 metres hurdles, long jump, triple jump, and 4 × 400 metres relay.

In 2019, he was inducted into the Trinity Athletic Hall of Fame.

== Professional career ==
=== Seattle Seahawks ===
Urban was signed as an undrafted free agent by the Seattle Seahawks after the 2003 NFL draft on May 1. He was waived and signed to the practice squad. On December 26, he was promoted to the active roster. He was declared inactive for the season finale and the playoffs.

On September 10, 2004, he was released and signed to the practice squad the next day. He was promoted to the active roster. He appeared in 4 games, registering 7 receptions for 151 yards (19.5-yard avg.). He missed the last 2 games and the playoffs with a foot injury.

On September 13, 2005, he was released. On October 4, he was re-signed for depth purposes. His season was cut short by a re-aggravated left foot stress fracture. On November 8, he was released and placed on injured reserve the next day. He was kept as a member of the team during the 2005 NFC Championship run that saw the Seahawks play in Super Bowl XL. Urban was considered in the media to be the ultimate team player. Seattle Post-Intelligencer sportswriter Jim Moore wrote of Urban's tenure with the Seahawks that he "...wasn't a good soldier, he was a great one." Quarterback Matt Hasselbeck said of Urban, "Whatever the definition of a Seahawk is, he's it." ESPN's Bill Williamson wrote, "This is an under-the-radar player who always seems to make coaches fall in love with him." On June 2, 2006, he was released as he had problems staying healthy during his time with the Seahawks.

=== Dallas Cowboys ===
On October 19, 2006, he was signed to the Dallas Cowboys practice squad. On September 1, 2007, he was released.

=== Arizona Cardinals ===
On September 2, 2007, he was claimed off waivers by the Arizona Cardinals. He caught a then career-high 22 receptions for 329 yards and 2 touchdowns, in the NFC Championship year that saw the Cardinals play in Super Bowl XLIII.

In 2008, he set new career marks with 34 catches for 448 yards and four touchdowns. He also contributed 11 tackles on special teams and completed his first pass in the NFL. In 2009, he appeared in 10 games, collecting 18 receptions for 186 yards. He wasn't re-signed after the season.

=== Kansas City Chiefs ===
On March 11, 2010, he was signed as a free agent by the Kansas City Chiefs, reuniting with his former coach Todd Haley. On September 4, he was placed on the injured reserve list, with a torn flexor tendon in the ring finger on his right hand. In 2011, he appeared in 6 games (one start), making 4 receptions for 35 yards and one touchdown. He wasn't re-signed after the season.

== Coaching career ==
In 2005, he was a track assistant coach at Trinity University, coaching the long jump, triple jump and javelin. In 2012, he was hired as the defensive backs coach.

In 2013, he was named the offensive coordinator. On November 21, 2013, he became the Tigers head football coach after the retirement of Steve Mohr, who held the position for 24 years.

In 2022, he would lead the Tigers to win their first round playoff game against Hardin–Simmons, 14–7. The win marked the first time since 2002 (and since his final year playing at the school) that Trinity won a game in the NCAA Division III playoffs.

== Head coaching record ==
Year	Team	Overall	Conference	Standing	Bowl/playoffs	AFCA^{#}	D3^{°}
Trinity Tigers (Southern Collegiate Athletic Conference) (2014–2016)
2014	Trinity	4–6	2–1	2nd			
2015	Trinity	8–2	2–1	2nd			
2016	Trinity	5–5	3–3	2nd			
Trinity Tigers (Southern Athletic Association) (2017–present)
2017	Trinity	6–4	5–3	4th			
2018	Trinity	7–3	6–2	3rd			
2019	Trinity	8–2	7–1	T–1st			
2020–21	Trinity	3–1	3–1	T–2nd			
2021	Trinity	9–1	7–0	1st	L NCAA Division III First Round	15	12
2022	Trinity	11–1	7–0	1st	L NCAA Division III Second Round	5	6
2023	Trinity	10–2	8–0	1st	L NCAA Division III Second Round	11	11
2024	Trinity	8–3	6–1	T–1st	L NCAA Division III First Round		
2025	Trinity	10–2	6–1	2nd	L NCAA Division III Third Round	16	16
2026	Trinity	0–0	0–0				
Trinity:		89–32	62–14				
Total:		89–32					
National championship Conference title Conference division title or championship game berth
