= Stephen Spach =

American football player (born 1982)

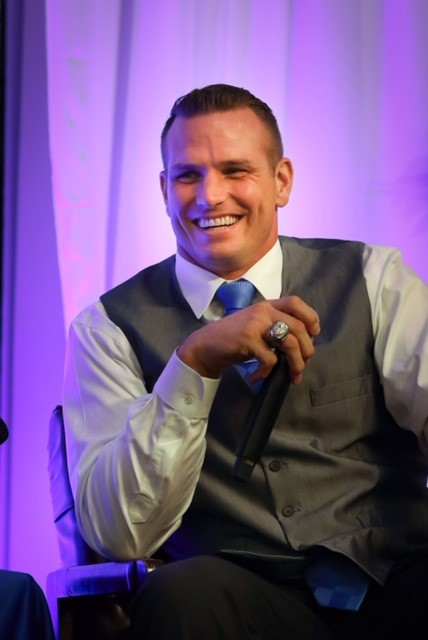
- Spach at the 2018 Clovis High School football Hall of Fame induction

No. 41, 82, 83, 81
- Position: Tight end

Personal information
- Born: July 18, 1982 (age 44); Fresno, California, U.S.
- Listed height: 6 ft 4 in (1.93 m)
- Listed weight: 250 lb (113 kg)

Career information
- High school: Clovis (Clovis, California)
- College: Fresno State
- NFL draft: 2005: undrafted

Career history
- Philadelphia Eagles (2005); Minnesota Vikings (2007)*; New England Patriots (2007–2008); Arizona Cardinals (2008–2010); St. Louis Rams (2011); Jacksonville Jaguars (2012)
- * Offseason or practice squad member only

Career NFL statistics
- Receptions: 22
- Receiving yards: 137
- Stats at Pro Football Reference

Stephen Joseph Spach (born July 18, 1982) is an American former professional football player who was a tight end in the National Football League (NFL). He was signed by the Philadelphia Eagles of the NFL as an undrafted free agent in 2005. He played college football for the Fresno State Bulldogs. Spach was also a member of the Minnesota Vikings, New England Patriots, Arizona Cardinals, St. Louis Rams, and Jacksonville Jaguars.

== Early life ==
Spach attended Clovis High School and was a letterman in football and basketball. In football, he helped lead his team to a 12–1 record, a Tri-River Athletic Conference Championship and a Central Section Championship as a senior (1999 season).

Spach walked-on as a freshman (finally earning a scholarship as a redshirt sophomore) at California State University, Fresno, and contributed to four winning seasons under Head Coach Pat Hill (2001–2004). During that stretch the Bulldogs became the only BCS non-AQ conference team to record three straight bowl victories over BCS AQ conference schools (2002, 2003, 2004). In the Bulldogs 37–34 win over Virginia in the 2004 MPC Computers Bowl on the final play of his senior season, Spach caught the game-winning 25-yard touchdown pass from quarterback Paul Pinegar on the Bulldogs' first offensive play in overtime. He played both the Tight End and Fullback positions throughout his time at Fresno State.

Spach earned his degree in Recreation Administration, finishing his studies with an internship with Progressive Sports Conditioning in Fresno, California.

== Professional career ==
=== Philadelphia Eagles ===
Following the NFL draft in 2005, Spach was signed to a 3-year contract as an undrafted free agent with the Philadelphia Eagles. He entered training camp in Lehigh at the bottom of the tight end depth chart, but impressed enough in camp and in the preseason to solidify a position on the 53-man regular season roster behind starter L. J. Smith. Spach contributed primarily in a blocking role at tight end and fullback, as well as on special teams throughout the season. A foot injury in a division game against the Washington Redskins midway through the season sidelined Spach three games, and allowed for the return of tight end Chad Lewis to the Eagles roster. Upon returning to the game roster, Spach contributed mainly at fullback and on special teams through the remainder of the Eagles disappointing 2005 season.

After the 2006 preseason, Spach was released by the Eagles as part of the final roster cut. He was out of football for the entire 2006 NFL season.

=== Minnesota Vikings ===
Spach signed a future contract with the Minnesota Vikings in January 2007 and joined the team in March for offseason training. An overflow of tight ends on the roster (including the newly signed Visanthe Shiancoe) contributed to Spach's eventual release, again on the final roster cut in September following the 2007 NFL preseason.

=== New England Patriots ===
He was signed by the New England Patriots to a 2-year contract in December 2007. He played in the final three games of the Patriots historic 16–0 regular season, contributing mainly as a blocking tight end and on special teams. He also saw action in the AFC Championship Game victory over the San Diego Chargers on January 20, 2008, but was listed among the team's 8 inactive players for the Super Bowl XLII loss to the New York Giants in Arizona.

In 2008, Spach made the regular season roster for New England and saw action in the first two weeks of the season (both victories), before being released September 15, 2008.

=== Arizona Cardinals ===
Six weeks later, Spach was signed to a contract with the Arizona Cardinals on October 28, 2008. He played varying roles for the Cardinals throughout the remaining 9 regular-season games, but only caught 2 receptions totaling 15 yards in the regular season. In the Cardinals first round home playoff win over the Atlanta Falcons Spach had 3 receptions, including a 24-yard first down catch from Kurt Warner late in the 4th quarter on third down and 16 that allowed Arizona to kneel the ball for the victory.

A week later Spach suffered a torn ACL in the 4th quarter of Arizona's divisional playoff win against the Carolina Panthers. He was placed on injured reserve and was unable to play in the following NFC Championship and Super Bowl XLIII.

He was re-signed by the Cardinals to a 1-year contract in March 2009 and remained on the roster the entire 2009 season, mainly contributing in a reserve role as a blocker and on special teams, totaling 4 catches for 38 yards on the season.

In March 2010 he was signed by the Cardinals to another 1-year deal and played in 15 games, starting 11. He finished the season with 7 receptions for 40 yards. On January 2, 2011, during warm-ups before the final 2010 regular season game in San Francisco, Spach tore a calf muscle and was unable to play.

He signed again with Arizona for the 2011 season, following the NFL Lockout. He was signed to a 1-year contract but was released after the preseason on September 4, 2011. He signed with the St. Louis Rams the following day.

=== St. Louis Rams ===
On September 5, 2011, he was signed by the St. Louis Rams. He saw action in 10 regular season games at both the tight end and fullback positions.

=== Jacksonville Jaguars ===
Spach was signed by the Jacksonville Jaguars on September 10, 2012.

He was released on September 19, 2012.

== Personal life ==
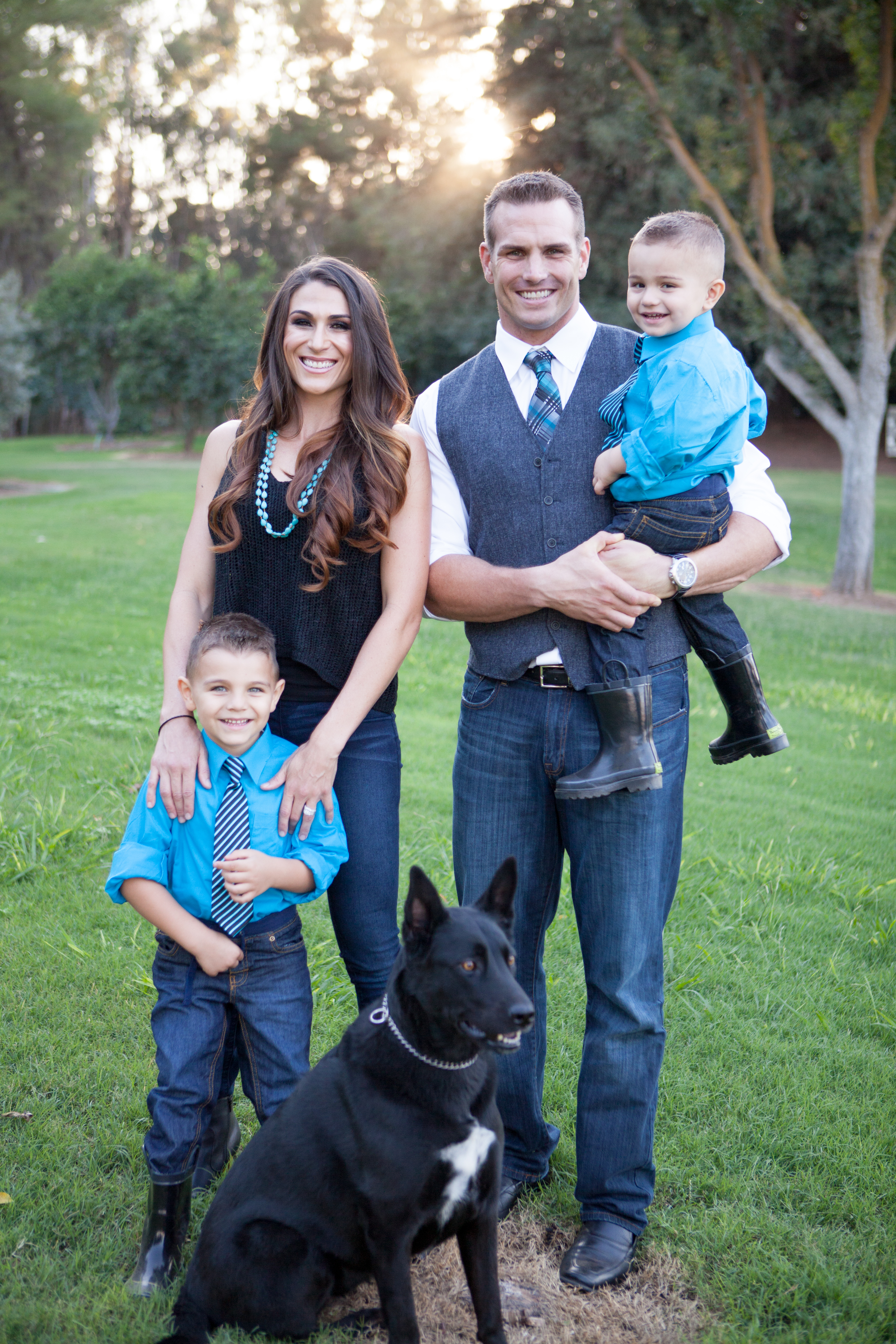
Spach with his family in 2015

Spach resides in Clovis, California with his wife and sons.
