= 2009 Arizona Cardinals season =

NFL team season

- Owner: Bill Bidwill
- General manager: Rod Graves
- Head coach: Ken Whisenhunt
- Defensive coordinator: Billy Davis
- Home stadium: University of Phoenix Stadium

Results
- Record: 10–6
- Division place: 1st NFC West
- Playoffs: Won Wild Card Playoffs (vs. Packers) 51–45 (OT); Lost Divisional Playoffs (at Saints) 14–45
- All-Pros: Adrian Wilson (1st team); Larry Fitzgerald (2nd team); Darnell Dockett (2nd team)
- Pro Bowlers: 5 SS Adrian Wilson; WR Larry Fitzgerald; DE Darnell Dockett; CB Dominique Rodgers-Cromartie; DB Antrel Rolle

Uniform
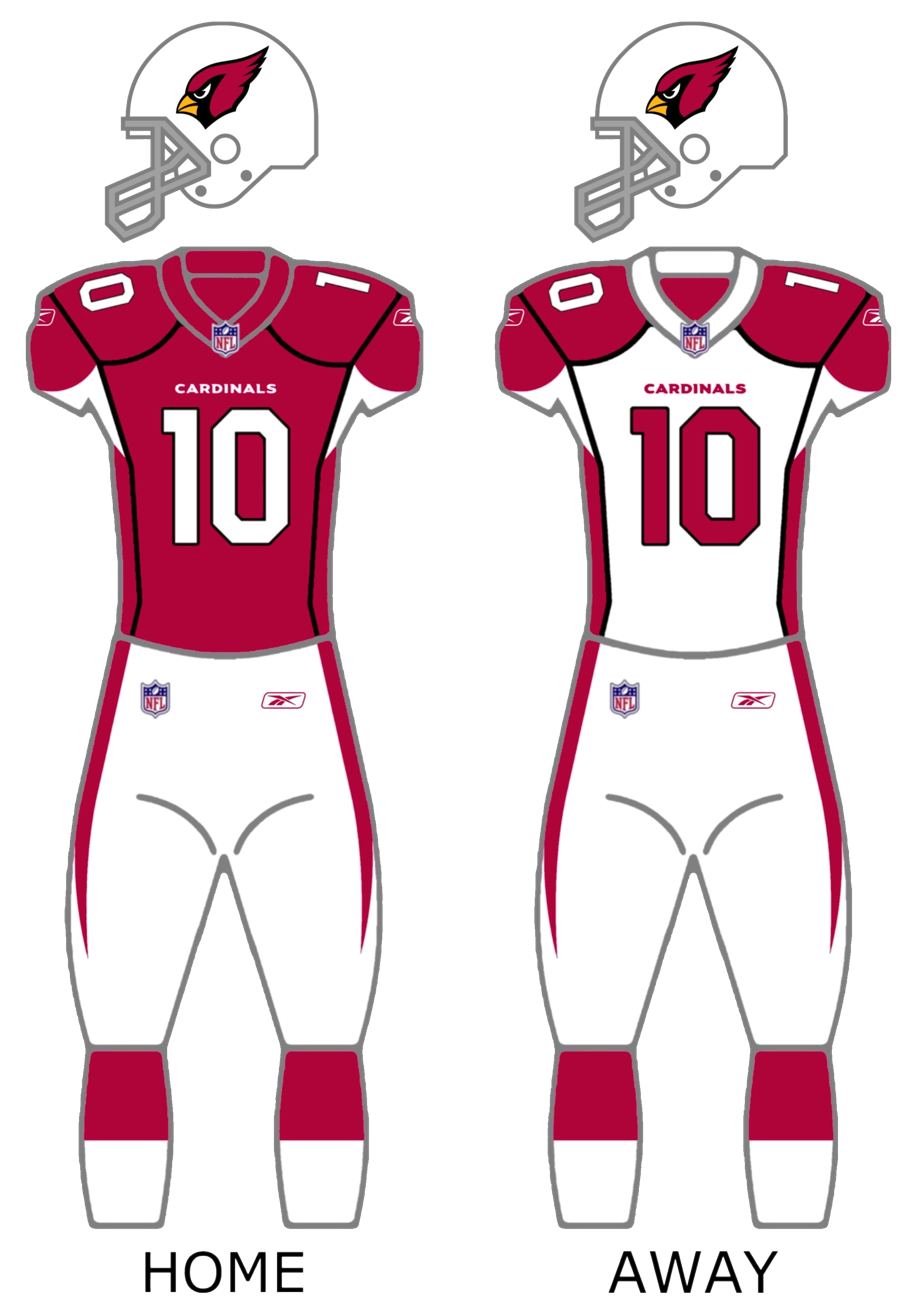

The 2009 season was the Arizona Cardinals' 90th in the National Football League (NFL), their 22nd in Arizona and their third under head coach Ken Whisenhunt.

The Cardinals finished the season with a 10–6 record, an improvement from their 9–7 previous season record and the first time the team has won 10 games since 1976. The franchise was able to successfully defend the National Football Conference (NFC) West division title and earned a playoff berth in the NFC Wild Card round against the Green Bay Packers, which they won in overtime by 51–45, the highest scoring game for two teams combined in a playoff game. The following week on January 17, 2010, the Cardinals were blown out by the eventual Super Bowl champion New Orleans Saints 45–14 in the NFC divisional round. This game would be the final game of quarterback Kurt Warner's career, and this was the only playoff game in thirteen total appearances in which he failed to throw a touchdown pass.

The 2009 season was the team's first to secure back-to-back postseason appearances since its move to Arizona, and the first time the team did so since 1975.

== Offseason ==
=== Staff changes ===
- Billy Davis has replaced Clancy Pendergast as defensive coordinator.
- Russ Grimm has been appointed running game coordinator and retains his title of assistant head coach and offensive line coach.
- Todd Haley has left the offensive coordinator position to join the Kansas City Chiefs as their head coach.
- John McNulty has replaced Mike Miller as receivers coach.
- Chris Miller has been appointed quarterbacks coach.
- Mike Miller has been promoted from receivers coach to passing game coordinator.
- Curtis Modkins has replaced Maurice Carthon as running backs coach.
- Matt Raich has replaced Billy Davis as linebackers coach.

=== Signings ===
- C/G Ben Claxton
- FB Justin Green
- FB Dan Kreider
- LS Mike Leach
- S Keith Lewis
- CB Bryant McFadden
- QB Tyler Palko
- P Waylon Prather
- RB Jason Wright

=== Released ===
- LS Nathan Hodel

=== Free agents ===
Pos.	Player	Tag	Result
CB	Michael Adams	ERFA	
RB	J. J. Arrington	UFA	Signed with Broncos
DE	Jason Banks	ERFA	Re-signed with Cardinals
LB	Monty Beisel	UFA	Signed with Kansas City Chiefs
DE	Bertrand Berry	UFA	Re-signed with Cardinals
T/G	Elton Brown	UFA	Re-signed with Cardinals
CB	Ralph Brown	UFA	Re-signed with Cardinals
FB	Tim Castille	ERFA	
LB	Karlos Dansby	UFA	Franchised tagged by Cardinals
DE	Keilen Dykes		Re-signed with Cardinals
CB	Wilrey Fontenot		Re-signed with Cardinals
P	Ben Graham	UFA	Re-signed with Cardinals
CB	Eric Green	UFA	Signed with Dolphins
LB	Clark Haggans	UFA	Re-signed with Cardinals
WR	Onrea Jones		Re-signed with Cardinals
S	Dennis Keyes		Re-signed with Cardinals
WR	Lance Long		Re-signed with Cardinals
TE	Ben Patrick	ERFA	
C	Scott Peters	UFA	
TE	Leonard Pope	RFA	
C/G	Pat Ross	UFA	
C	Lyle Sendlein	ERFA	
TE	Alex Shor	ERFA	Re-signed with Cardinals
DE	Antonio Smith	UFA	Signed with Texans
FB	Terrelle Smith	UFA	
TE	Stephen Spach	ERFA	
QB	Brian St. Pierre	UFA	Re-signed with Cardinals
LB	Matt Stewart	UFA	Signed with Cowboys
LB	Pago Togafau	ERFA	
TE	Jerame Tuman	UFA	
OT	Elliot Vallejo	ERFA	
RB	Chris Vincent	ERFA	Re-signed with Cardinals
QB	Kurt Warner	UFA	Re-signed with Cardinals
DT	Gabe Watson	RFA	
UFA: Unrestricted free agent; RFA: Restricted free agent; ERFA: Exclusive rights free agent

== 2009 NFL draft ==
As NFC champion and having lost Super Bowl XLIII, the Cardinals had the second-to-last pick in the first round (31st overall).

2009 Arizona Cardinals draft selections
Draft order		Player	Position	Height	Weight	College
Round	Choice	Player	Position	Height	Weight	College
1	31	Chris "Beanie" Wells	RB	6 ft 1 in (1.85 m)	237 lb (108 kg)	Ohio State
2	63	Cody Brown	DE	6 ft 2 in (1.88 m)	248 lb (112 kg)	Connecticut
3	95	Rashad Johnson	S	5 ft 11 in (1.80 m)	203 lb (92 kg)	Alabama
4	131	Greg Toler	CB	5 ft 10 in (1.78 m)	182 lb (83 kg)	Saint Paul's College
5	167	Herman Johnson	G	6 ft 7 in (2.01 m)	382 lb (173 kg)	LSU
6	204	Will Davis	DE	6 ft 3 in (1.91 m)	268 lb (122 kg)	Illinois
7	240	LaRod Stephens-Howling	HB	5 ft 7 in (1.70 m)	180 lb (82 kg)	Pitt
7	254	Trevor Canfield	G	6 ft 5 in (1.96 m)	305 lb (138 kg)	Cincinnati

== Coaching staff ==
Arizona Cardinals 2009 staff
Front office: Owner/chairman – Bill Bidwill; President – Michael Bidwill; Vice-president – Bill Bidwill, Jr.; General manager/vice-president of football operations – Rod Graves; Director of football administration – Reggie Terry; Director of player personnel – Steve Keim; Director of pro personnel – T. J. McCreight; Head coaches: Head coach – Ken Whisenhunt; Assistant head coach/run game coordinator/offensive line – Russ Grimm; Offensive coaches: Pass game coordinator – Mike Miller; Quarterbacks – Chris Miller; Running backs – Curtis Modkins; Wide receivers – John McNulty; Tight ends – Freddie Kitchens; Offensive quality control – Chad Grimm	Defensive coaches: Defensive coordinator – Billy Davis; Defensive line – Ron Aiken; Linebackers – Matt Raich; Defensive backs – Teryl Austin; Assistant defensive backs – Rick Courtright; Defensive quality control – Ryan Slowik; Special teams coaches: Special teams coordinator – Kevin Spencer; Strength and conditioning: Strength and conditioning – John Lott

== Final roster ==
2009 Arizona Cardinals roster
Quarterbacks (QB): 7 Matt Leinart; 2 Brian St. Pierre; 13 Kurt Warner; Running backs (RB): 34 Tim Hightower; 35 Dan Kreider FB; 36 LaRod Stephens-Howling; 26 Beanie Wells; 31 Jason Wright; Wide receivers (WR): 81 Anquan Boldin; 15 Steve Breaston PR; 80 Early Doucet; 11 Larry Fitzgerald; 87 Sean Morey; 85 Jerheme Urban; Tight ends (TE): 84 Anthony Becht; 89 Ben Patrick; 83 Stephen Spach	Offensive linemen (OL): 73 Jeremy Bridges G/T; 75 Levi Brown T; 62 Ben Claxton C; 67 Herman Johnson G/T; 72 Brandon Keith G/T; 76 Deuce Lutui G; 63 Lyle Sendlein C; 74 Reggie Wells G; Defensive linemen (DL): 78 Alan Branch DE/NT; 79 Jason Banks DE; 93 Calais Campbell DE; 90 Darnell Dockett DE; 91 Kenny Iwebema DE; 97 Bryan Robinson NT; 98 Gabe Watson NT	Linebackers (LB): 50 Monty Beisel OLB; 92 Bertrand Berry OLB; 58 Karlos Dansby ILB; 59 Will Davis OLB; 53 Clark Haggans OLB; 54 Gerald Hayes ILB; 56 Chike Okeafor OLB; 51 Pago Togafau OLB; 55 Reggie Walker ILB; Defensive backs (DB): 41 Hamza Abdullah SS; 27 Michael Adams CB; 20 Ralph Brown CB; 49 Rashad Johnson FS; 25 Bryant McFadden CB; 29 Dominique Rodgers-Cromartie; 21 Antrel Rolle FS/PR; 28 Greg Toler CB; 24 Adrian Wilson SS; Special teams (ST): 5 Ben Graham P; 82 Mike Leach LS; 1 Neil Rackers K	Practice squad: 23 Rashad Barksdale CB; 94 Keilen Dykes DE (IR); 16 Edward Gant WR; 95 Ali Highsmith LB; 17 Onrea Jones WR; 66 Jonathan Palmer G/T; 68 Tom Pestock G/T; 96 Mark Washington LB; Reserve: 52 Cody Brown LB (IR); 69 Mike Gandy T (IR); 33 Justin Green FB (IR); 22 Matt Ware S (IR); Rookies in italics 53 active, 5 reserve, 7 practice squad

== Preseason ==
=== Schedule ===
Week	Date	Opponent	Result	Record	Venue	Recap
1	August 13	at Pittsburgh Steelers	L 10–20	0–1	Heinz Field	Recap
2	August 22	San Diego Chargers	L 6–17	0–2	University of Phoenix Stadium	Recap
3	August 28	Green Bay Packers	L 37–44	0–3	University of Phoenix Stadium	Recap
4	September 3	at Denver Broncos	L 0–19	0–4	Invesco Field at Mile High	Recap

== Regular season ==
=== Schedule ===
Week	Date	Opponent	Result	Record	Venue	Recap
1	September 13	San Francisco 49ers	L 16–20	0–1	University of Phoenix Stadium	Recap
2	September 20	at Jacksonville Jaguars	W 31–17	1–1	Jacksonville Municipal Stadium	Recap
3	September 27	Indianapolis Colts	L 10–31	1–2	University of Phoenix Stadium	Recap
4	Bye					
5	October 11	Houston Texans	W 28–21	2–2	University of Phoenix Stadium	Recap
6	October 18	at Seattle Seahawks	W 27–3	3–2	Qwest Field	Recap
7	October 25	at New York Giants	W 24–17	4–2	Giants Stadium	Recap
8	November 1	Carolina Panthers	L 21–34	4–3	University of Phoenix Stadium	Recap
9	November 8	at Chicago Bears	W 41–21	5–3	Soldier Field	Recap
10	November 15	Seattle Seahawks	W 31–20	6–3	University of Phoenix Stadium	Recap
11	November 22	at St. Louis Rams	W 21–13	7–3	Edward Jones Dome	Recap
12	November 29	at Tennessee Titans	L 17–20	7–4	LP Field	Recap
13	December 6	Minnesota Vikings	W 30–17	8–4	University of Phoenix Stadium	Recap
14	December 14	at San Francisco 49ers	L 9–24	8–5	Candlestick Park	Recap
15	December 20	at Detroit Lions	W 31–24	9–5	Ford Field	Recap
16	December 27	St. Louis Rams	W 31–10	10–5	University of Phoenix Stadium	Recap
17	January 3	Green Bay Packers	L 7–33	10–6	University of Phoenix Stadium	Recap

== Standings ==
NFC West
	W	L	T	PCT	DIV	CONF	PF	PA	STK
^{(4)} Arizona Cardinals	10	6	0	.625	4–2	8–4	375	325	L1
San Francisco 49ers	8	8	0	.500	5–1	7–5	330	281	W2
Seattle Seahawks	5	11	0	.313	3–3	4–8	280	390	L4
St. Louis Rams	1	15	0	.063	0–6	1–11	175	436	L8

== Regular season results ==
=== Week 1: vs. San Francisco 49ers ===
Week 1: San Francisco 49ers at Arizona Cardinals – Game summary

Quarter	1	2	3	4	Total
49ers	6	7	0	7	20
Cardinals	0	6	7	3	16

at University of Phoenix Stadium, Glendale, Arizona

- Date: September 13
- Game time: 10:15 a.m. MST
- Game weather: None (retractable roof closed)
- Game attendance: 61,981
- Referee: Don Carey
- TV announcers (Fox): Sam Rosen, Tim Ryan and Nischelle Turner
- Box Score

Game information

First quarter

- SF – Joe Nedney 37-yard field goal, 5:34. 49ers 3–0. Drive: 5 plays, 17 yards, 2:30.
- SF – Joe Nedney 50-yard field goal, 1:22. 49ers 6–0. Drive: 5 plays, 24 yards, 2:22.

Second quarter

- ARI – Neil Rackers 44-yard field goal, 14:03. 49ers 6–3. Drive: 6 plays, 52 yards, 2:19.
- SF – Frank Gore 6-yard run (Neil Rackers kick), 2:23. 49ers 13–3. Drive: 7 plays, 68 yards, 3:03.
- ARI – Neil Rackers 29-yard field goal, 0:00. 49ers 13–6. Drive: 8 plays, 49 yards, 1:15.

Third quarter

- ARI – Larry Fitzgerald 5-yard pass from Kurt Warner (Neil Rackers kick), 4:11. Tied 13–13. Drive: 7 plays, 69 yards, 4:10.

Fourth quarter

- ARI – Neil Rackers 43-yard field goal, 14:52. Cardinals 16–13. Drive: 8 plays, 36 yards, 3:20.
- SF – Frank Gore 3-yard pass from Shaun Hill (Joe Nedney kick), 7:26. 49ers 20–16. Drive: 15 plays, 80 yards, 7:26.

Top passers

- SF – Shaun Hill – 18/31, 209 yards, TD
- ARI – Kurt Warner – 26/44, 288 yards, TD, 2 INT

Top rushers

- SF – Frank Gore – 22 rushes, 30 yards, TD
- ARI – Beanie Wells – 7 rushes, 29 yards

Top receivers

- SF – Isaac Bruce – 4 receptions, 74 yards
- ARI – Tim Hightower – 12 receptions, 121 yards

With their NFC title on the line, the Cardinals began their season at home in a Week 1 divisional duel with their NFC West rival, the San Francisco 49ers. In the first quarter, Arizona trailed early as Niners kicker Joe Nedney got a 37-yard and a 50-yard field goal. In the second quarter, the Cardinals got on the board as kicker Neil Rackers made a 44-yard field goal. San Francisco answered with running back Frank Gore getting a 6-yard touchdown run, while Arizona closed out the half with Rackers kicking a 29-yard field goal.

The Cardinals would tie the game in the third quarter as quarterback Kurt Warner completed a 5-yard touchdown pass to wide receiver Larry Fitzgerald. In the fourth quarter, Arizona took the lead as Rackers nailed a 43-yard field goal. However, the 49ers regained their lead as quarterback Shaun Hill completed a 3-yard touchdown pass to Gore. San Francisco's defense would then prevent the Cards' offense from rallying.

With the loss, the Cardinals began their season at 0–1.

=== Week 2: at Jacksonville Jaguars ===
Week 2: Arizona Cardinals at Jacksonville Jaguars – Game summary

Quarter	1	2	3	4	Total
Cardinals	10	14	7	0	31
Jaguars	3	0	7	7	17

at Jacksonville Municipal Stadium, Jacksonville, Florida

- Date: September 20
- Game time: 1:00 p.m. EDT/10:00 a.m. MST
- Game weather: Mostly Cloudy, 83 °F (28 °C)
- Game attendance: 46,520
- Referee: Gene Steratore
- TV announcers (Fox): Chris Myers and Trent Green
- Box Score

Game information

First quarter

- ARI – Tim Hightower 1-yard run (Neil Rackers kick), 8:07. Cardinals 7–0. Drive: 11 plays, 75 yards, 6:53.
- JAX – Josh Scobee 30-yard field goal, 4:41. Cardinals 7–3. Drive: 7 plays, 62 yards, 3:26.
- ARI – Neil Rackers 45-yard field goal, 0:03. Cardinals 10–3. Drive: 8 plays, 53 yards, 4:38.

Second quarter

- ARI – Antrel Rolle 83-yard blocked field goal return (Neil Rackers kick), 11:30. Cardinals 17–3.
- ARI – Jason Wright 5-yard pass from Kurt Warner (Neil Rackers kick), 0:55. Cardinals 24–3. Drive: 7 plays, 68 yards, 1:18.

Third quarter

- ARI – Larry Fitzgerald 22-yard pass from Kurt Warner (Neil Rackers kick), 5:28. Cardinals 31–3. Drive: 4 plays, 38 yards, 2:04.
- JAX – Marcedes Lewis 25-yard pass from David Garrard (Josh Scobee kick), 1:31. Cardinals 31–10. Drive: 8 plays, 64 yards, 3:57.

Fourth quarter

- JAX – Mike Sims-Walker 19-yard pass from David Garrard (Josh Scobee kick), 7:11. Cardinals 31–17. Drive: 14 plays, 85 yards, 5:09.

Top passers

- ARI – Kurt Warner – 24/26, 243 yards, 2 TD
- JAX – David Garrard – 23/43, 282 yards, 2 TD, INT

Top rushers

- ARI – Tim Hightower – 15 rushes, 72 yards, TD
- JAX – Maurice Jones-Drew – 13 rushes, 66 yards

Top receivers

- ARI – Steve Breaston – 5 receptions, 83 yards
- JAX – Mike Sims-Walker – 6 receptions, 106 yards, TD

Hoping to rebound from their loss to the 49ers, the Cardinals traveled to Jacksonville Municipal Stadium for a Week 2 interconference duel with the Jacksonville Jaguars. The Cardinals scored on their first drive with a 1-yard run by running back Tim Hightower. The Jaguars also scored on their first possession with a 30-yard field goal from kicker Josh Scobee. Arizona then answered with a 45-yard field goal by kicker Neil Rackers. In the second quarter, trailing 10–3, the Jaguars lined up for another Scobee field goal only to have it blocked by backup defensive end Calais Campbell and returned by free safety Antrel Rolle for an 83-yard touchdown. The Cardinals would extend their lead by halftime as quarterback Kurt Warner completed a 5-yard touchdown pass to running back Jason Wright.

Warner would find wide receiver Larry Fitzgerald in the third quarter for a 22-yard touchdown pass that increased the Cardinal lead to 28. Jacksonville would attempt to mount a comeback with quarterback David Garrard completing a 25-yard touchdown pass to tight end Marcedes Lewis in the third quarter and a 25-yard touchdown pass to wide receiver Mike Sims-Walker in the fourth quarter, but Arizona held on for the victory.

With the win, the Cardinals improved to 1–1.

Warner's performance (24/26, 243 yards, 2 TDs) would become the new NFL record for a single-game completion percentage (92.3%), snapping Vinny Testaverde's old record set in 1993 (91.3%).

=== Week 3: vs. Indianapolis Colts ===
Week 3: Indianapolis Colts at Arizona Cardinals – Game summary

Quarter	1	2	3	4	Total
Colts	0	21	7	3	31
Cardinals	3	0	7	0	10

at University of Phoenix Stadium, Glendale, Arizona

- Date: September 27
- Game time: 5:30 p.m. MST
- Game weather: None (retractable roof closed)
- Game attendance: 62,692
- Referee: Peter Morelli
- TV announcers (NBC): Al Michaels, Cris Collinsworth and Andrea Kremer
- Box Score

Game information

First quarter

- ARI – Neil Rackers 38-yard field goal, 2:46. Cardinals 3–0. Drive: 7 plays, 48 yards, 3:16.

Second quarter

- IND – Reggie Wayne 20-yard pass from Peyton Manning (Adam Vinatieri kick), 9:04. Colts 7–3. Drive: 11 plays, 95 yards, 5:09.
- IND – Dallas Clark 10-yard pass from Peyton Manning (Adam Vinatieri kick), 5:49. Colts 14–3. Drive: 6 plays, 57 yards, 2:24.
- IND – Pierre Garcon 53-yard pass from Peyton Manning (Adam Vinatieri kick), 1:52. Colts 21–3. Drive: 4 plays, 68 yards, 1:54.

Third quarter

- ARI – Anquan Boldin 10-yard pass from Kurt Warner (Neil Rackers kick), 10:50. Colts 21–10. Drive: 8 plays, 73 yards, 4:10.
- IND – Joseph Addai 3-yard pass from Peyton Manning (Adam Vinatieri kick), 2:26. Colts 28–10. Drive: 4 plays, 80 yards, 2:07.

Fourth quarter

- IND – Adam Vinatieri 26-yard field goal, 11:31. Colts 31–10. Drive: 6 plays, 32 yards, 3:22.

Top passers

- IND – Peyton Manning – 24/35, 379 yards, 4 TD, INT
- ARI – Kurt Warner – 30/52, 332 yards, TD, 2 INT

Top rushers

- IND – Joseph Addai – 13 rushes, 63 yards
- ARI – Tim Hightower – 9 rushes, 22 yards

Top receivers

- IND – Reggie Wayne – 7 receptions, 126 yards, TD
- ARI – Steve Breaston – 7 receptions, 94 yards

Coming off their Week 2 road win over the Jaguars, the Cardinals went home for a Week 3 Sunday night interconference duel with the Indianapolis Colts. Arizona took flight in the first quarter with kicker Neil Rackers' 38-yard field goal. However, the Colts took a monster lead in the second quarter as quarterback Peyton Manning completed a 20-yard touchdown pass to wide receiver Reggie Wayne, a 10-yard touchdown pass to tight end Dallas Clark, and a 53-yard touchdown pass to wide receiver Pierre Garçon.

The Cardinals tried to fight back in the third quarter as quarterback Kurt Warner hooked up with wide receiver Anquan Boldin on a 10-yard touchdown pass, but Indianapolis replied with Manning's 3-yard touchdown pass to running back Joseph Addai. Afterwards, the Colts closed out the game in the fourth quarter with kicker Adam Vinatieri's 26-yard field goal.

With the loss, Arizona entered its bye week at 1–2.

=== Week 5: vs. Houston Texans ===
Week 5: Houston Texans at Arizona Cardinals – Game summary

Quarter	1	2	3	4	Total
Texans	0	0	7	14	21
Cardinals	7	14	0	7	28

at University of Phoenix Stadium, Glendale, Arizona

- Date: October 11
- Game time: 1:15 p.m. MST
- Game weather: None (retractable roof closed)
- Game attendance: 61,819
- Referee: Tony Corrente
- TV announcers (CBS): Ian Eagle and Rich Gannon
- Box Score

Game information

First quarter

- ARI – Tim Hightower 1-yard run (Neil Rackers kick), 9:29. Cardinals 7–0. Drive: 8 plays, 64 yards, 4:15.

Second quarter

- ARI – Larry Fitzgerald 9-yard pass from Kurt Warner (Neil Rackers kick), 1:44. Cardinals 14–0. Drive: 7 plays, 68 yards, 2:35.
- ARI – Larry Fitzgerald 26-yard pass from Kurt Warner (Neil Rackers kick), 0:21. Cardinals 21–0. Drive: 3 plays, 48 yards, 0:53.

Third quarter

- HOU – Chris Brown 1-yard run (Kris Brown kick), 3:29. Cardinals 21–7. Drive: 10 plays, 64 yards, 5:54.

Fourth quarter

- HOU – Andre Johnson 11-yard pass from Matt Schaub (Kris Brown kick), 12:18. Cardinals 21–14. Drive: 8 plays, 77 yards, 3:16.
- HOU – Andre Johnson 17-yard pass from Matt Schaub (Kris Brown kick), 6:59. Tied 21–21. Drive: 8 plays, 66 yards, 4:15.
- ARI – Dominique Rodgers-Cromartie 49-yard interception return (Neil Rackers kick), 2:20. Cardinals 28–21.

Top passers

- HOU – Matt Schaub – 35/50, 371 yards, 2 TD, INT
- ARI – Kurt Warner – 26/38, 302 yards, 2 TD

Top rushers

- HOU – Steve Slaton – 13 rushes, 39 yards
- ARI – Beanie Wells – 7 rushes, 24 yards

Top receivers

- HOU – Andre Johnson – 8 receptions, 101 yards, TD
- ARI – Anquan Boldin – 7 receptions, 81 yards

Coming off their bye week, the Cardinals stayed at home for a Week 5 interconference duel with the Houston Texans. Arizona would get off to a very fast start as running back Tim Hightower got a 1-yard touchdown run in the first quarter, followed by quarterback Kurt Warner completing a 9-yard and a 26-yard touchdown pass to wide receiver Larry Fitzgerald in the second.

However, the Texans gained steam in the third quarter with a 1-yard touchdown run from running back Chris Brown. Afterwards, Houston would tie the game in the fourth quarter with quarterback Matt Schaub completing an 11-yard and a 17-yard touchdown pass to wide receiver Andre Johnson. However, the Cardinals went back to work with two crucial defensive moments. First, cornerback Dominique Rodgers-Cromartie would return an interception 49 yards for a touchdown. Second, even when the Texans' offense got down to Arizona's 1-yard line on a 1st down play inside of the two-minute warning, the defense withstood three tries and held on for the victory.

With the win, the Cardinals improved to 2–2.

=== Week 6: at Seattle Seahawks ===
Week 6: Arizona Cardinals at Seattle Seahawks – Game summary

Quarter	1	2	3	4	Total
Cardinals	14	3	7	3	27
Seahawks	0	3	0	0	3

at Qwest Field, Seattle, Washington

- Date: October 18
- Game time: 1:05 p.m. MST & PDT
- Game weather: Cloudy, 58 °F (14 °C)
- Game attendance: 67,588
- Referee: Carl Cheffers
- TV announcers (Fox): Chris Myers and Brian Billick
- Box Score

Game information

First quarter

- ARI – Larry Fitzgerald 2-yard pass from Kurt Warner (Neil Rackers kick), 4:18. Cardinals 7–0. Drive: 15 plays, 80 yards, 10:42.
- ARI – Tim Hightower 2-yard run (Neil Rackers kick), 3:07. Cardinals 14–0. Drive: 3 plays, 23 yards, 1:11.

Second quarter

- ARI – Neil Rackers 29-yard field goal, 13:38. Cardinals 17–0. Drive: 7 plays, 12 yards, 3:46.
- SEA – Olindo Mare 28-yard field goal, 3:57. Cardinals 17–3. Drive: 9 plays, 59 yards, 4:12.

Third quarter

- ARI – Steve Breaston 16-yard pass from Kurt Warner (Neil Rackers kick), 2:54. Cardinals 24–3. Drive: 5 plays, 41 yards, 2:14.

Fourth quarter

- ARI – Neil Rackers 31-yard field goal, 6:05. Cardinals 27–3. Drive: 4 plays, 2 yards, 0:38.

Top passers

- ARI – Kurt Warner – 32/41, 276 yards, 2 TD, INT
- SEA – Matt Hasselbeck – 10/29, 112 yards, INT

Top rushers

- ARI – Tim Hightower – 13 rushes, 32 yards, TD
- SEA – Julius Jones – 5 rushes, 5 yards

Top receivers

- ARI – Larry Fitzgerald – 13 receptions, 100 yards, TD
- SEA – John Carlson – 2 receptions, 55 yards

Coming off their home win over the Texans, the Cardinals flew to Qwest Field for a Week 6 NFC West duel with the Seattle Seahawks. Arizona took flight in the first quarter with quarterback Kurt Warner hooking up with wide receiver Larry Fitzgerald on a 2-yard touchdown pass, followed by a 2-yard touchdown run from running back Tim Hightower. In the second quarter, the Cardinals would add onto their lead as kicker Neil Rackers made a 29-yard field goal. The Seahawks would then get their only score of the game as kicker Olindo Mare got a 28-yard field goal. In the second half, Arizona pulled away with Warner completing a 16-yard touchdown pass to wide receiver Steve Breaston in the third quarter and Rackers booting a 31-yard field goal in the fourth.

With the win, the Cardinals improved to 3–2.

=== Week 7: at New York Giants ===
Week 7: Arizona Cardinals at New York Giants – Game summary

Quarter	1	2	3	4	Total
Cardinals	0	10	14	0	24
Giants	0	14	0	3	17

at Giants Stadium, East Rutherford, New Jersey

- Date: October 25
- Game time: 8:30 p.m. EDT/5:30 p.m. MST
- Game weather: Clear, 57 °F (14 °C)
- Game attendance: 78,299
- Referee: Alberto Riveron
- TV announcers (NBC): Al Michaels, Cris Collinsworth and Andrea Kremer
- Box Score

Game information

First quarter

- No scoring plays

Second quarter

- NYG – Brandon Jacobs 4-yard run (Lawrence Tynes kick), 13:28. Giants 7–0. Drive: 3 plays, 29 yards, 0:38.
- ARI – Beanie Wells 13-yard run (Neil Rackers kick), 4:18. Tied 7–7. Drive: 7 plays, 46 yards, 3:09.
- NYG – Hakeem Nicks 62-yard pass from Eli Manning (Lawrence Tynes kick), 2:09. Giants 14–7. Drive: 4 plays, 75 yards, 2:09.
- ARI – Neil Rackers 30-yard field goal, 0:15. Giants 14–10. Drive: 5 plays, 51 yards, 1:54.

Third quarter

- ARI – Tim Hightower 1-yard run (Neil Rackers kick), 10:19. Cardinals 17–14. Drive: 7 plays, 55 yards, 3:42.
- ARI – Jason Wright 6-yard pass from Kurt Warner (Neil Rackers kick), 2:32. Cardinals 24–14. Drive: 3 plays, 20 yards, 1:37.

Fourth quarter

- NYG – Lawrence Tynes 20-yard field goal, 8:14. Cardinals 24–17. Drive: 10 plays, 42 yards, 4:57.

Top passers

- ARI – Kurt Warner – 20/36, 231 yards, TD, INT
- NYG – Eli Manning – 19/37, 243 yards, TD, 3 INT

Top rushers

- ARI – Beanie Wells – 14 rushes, 67 yards, TD
- NYG – Brandon Jacobs – 13 rushes, 76 yards, TD

Top receivers

- ARI – Larry Fitzgerald – 6 receptions, 83 yards
- NYG – Hakeem Nicks – 4 receptions, 80 yards, TD

Coming off their road win over the Seahawks, the Cardinals flew to Giants Stadium for a Week 7 Sunday night duel with the New York Giants. After a scoreless first quarter, Arizona would trail in the second quarter as Giants running back Brandon Jacobs got a 4-yard touchdown run. The Cardinals would answer with rookie running back Chris "Beanie" Wells, but New York came right back with quarterback Eli Manning completing a 62-yard touchdown pass to wide receiver Hakeem Nicks. Arizona would end the half with kicker Neil Rackers nailing a 30-yard field goal.

The Cardinals would take the lead in the third quarter with running back Tim Hightower's 1-yard touchdown run, followed by quarterback Kurt Warner completing a 6-yard touchdown pass to running back Jason Wright. The Giants tried to come back in the fourth quarter as kicker Lawrence Tynes booted a 20-yard field goal, yet safety Antrel Rolle's final interception of the game sealed the deal for Arizona.

With the win, the Cardinals improved to 4–2.

=== Week 8: vs. Carolina Panthers ===
Week 8: Carolina Panthers at Arizona Cardinals – Game summary

Quarter	1	2	3	4	Total
Panthers	7	21	0	6	34
Cardinals	7	0	7	7	21

at University of Phoenix Stadium, Glendale, Arizona

- Date: November 1
- Game time: 2:15 p.m. MST
- Game weather: None (retractable roof closed)
- Game attendance: 62,031
- Referee: Mike Carey
- TV announcers (Fox): Chris Myers, Brian Billick and Jaime Maggio
- Box Score

Game information

First quarter

- CAR – Jonathan Stewart 6-yard run (John Kasay kick), 7:22. Panthers 7–0. Drive: 15 plays, 74 yards, 7:38.
- ARI – LaRod Stephens-Howling 14-yard pass from Kurt Warner (Neil Rackers kick), 0:47. Tied 7–7. Drive: 11 plays, 81 yards, 6:35.

Second quarter

- CAR – Jonathan Stewart 10-yard run (John Kasay kick), 14:53. Panthers 14–7. Drive: 3 plays, 87 yards, 0:54.
- CAR – Steve Smith 50-yard pass from Jake Delhomme (John Kasay kick), 7:33. Panthers 21–7. Drive: 4 plays, 75 yards, 2:02.
- CAR – Julius Peppers 13-yard interception return (John Kasay kick), 7:28. Panthers 28–7.

Third quarter

- ARI – Ben Patrick 1-yard pass from Kurt Warner (Neil Rackers kick), 6:13. Panthers 28–14. Drive: 11 plays, 67 yards, 6:21.

Fourth quarter

- CAR – John Kasay 35-yard field goal, 11:40. Panthers 31–14. Drive: 4 plays, 3 yards, 2:14.
- ARI – Tim Hightower 1-yard run (Neil Rackers kick), 9:44. Panthers 31–21. Drive: 5 plays, 49 yards, 1:56.
- CAR – John Kasay 31-yard field goal, 2:40. Panthers 34–21. Drive: 7 plays, 18 yards, 4:22.

Top passers

- CAR – Jake Delhomme – 7/14, 90 yards, TD
- ARI – Kurt Warner – 27/46, 242 yards, 2 TD, 5 INT

Top rushers

- CAR – DeAngelo Williams – 23 rushes, 158 yards
- ARI – Beanie Wells – 8 rushes, 47 yards

Top receivers

- CAR – Steve Smith – 3 receptions, 56 yards, TD
- ARI – Larry Fitzgerald – 6 receptions, 66 yards

Coming off their impressive road win over the Giants, the Cardinals went home for a Week 8 duel with the Carolina Panthers in a rematch of last year's divisional game.

In the first quarter, Arizona trailed early as Panthers running back Jonathan Stewart got a 6-yard touchdown run. The Cardinals would respond as quarterback Kurt Warner completed a 14-yard touchdown pass to rookie running back LaRod Stephens-Howling. However, Carolina unleashed its fury in the second quarter with Stewart's 10-yard touchdown run, quarterback Jake Delhomme's 50-yard touchdown pass to wide receiver Steve Smith, and defensive end Julius Peppers returning an interception 13 yards for a touchdown.

The Cardinals would begin their rally in the third quarter as Warner connected with tight end Ben Patrick on a 1-yard touchdown pass, but the Panthers would answer in the fourth quarter as kicker John Kasay booted a 35-yard field goal. Arizona tried to come back as running back Tim Hightower got a 1-yard touchdown run, but Carolina would seal the win as Kasay nailed a 31-yard field goal.

With the loss, the Cardinals fell to 4–3.

=== Week 9: at Chicago Bears ===
Week 9: Arizona Cardinals at Chicago Bears – Game summary

Quarter	1	2	3	4	Total
Cardinals	14	17	3	7	41
Bears	7	0	0	14	21

at Soldier Field, Chicago, Illinois

- Date: November 8
- Game time: 12:00 p.m. CST/11:00 a.m. MST
- Game weather: Partly Cloudy, 65 °F (18 °C)
- Game attendance: 62,309
- Referee: Ed Hochuli
- TV announcers (Fox): Joe Buck, Troy Aikman and Pam Oliver
- Box Score

Game information

First quarter

- ARI – Larry Fitzgerald 11-yard pass from Kurt Warner (Neil Rackers kick), 12:12. Cardinals 7–0. Drive: 8 plays, 81 yards, 2:48.
- CHI – Greg Olsen 33-yard pass from Jay Cutler (Robbie Gould kick), 9:13. Tied 7–7. Drive: 6 plays, 90 yards, 2:59.
- ARI – Ben Patrick 6-yard pass from Kurt Warner (Neil Rackers kick), 3:26. Cardinals 14–7. Drive: 9 plays, 74 yards, 5:47.

Second quarter

- ARI – Larry Fitzgerald 17-yard pass from Kurt Warner (Neil Rackers kick), 11:19. Cardinals 21–7. Drive: 6 plays, 70 yards, 3:30.
- ARI – Anthony Becht 15-yard pass from Kurt Warner (Neil Rackers kick), 2:49. Cardinals 28–7. Drive: 10 plays, 86 yards, 5:01.
- ARI – Neil Rackers 43-yard field goal, 0:00. Cardinals 31–7. Drive: 4 plays, 24 yards, 0:22.

Third quarter

- ARI – Neil Rackers 30-yard field goal, 7:46. Cardinals 34–7. Drive: 11 plays, 57 yards, 5:32.

Fourth quarter

- CHI – Greg Olsen 3-yard pass from Jay Cutler (Robbie Gould kick), 11:50. Cardinals 34–14. Drive: 9 plays, 93 yards, 4:27.
- CHI – Greg Olsen 20-yard pass from Jay Cutler (Robbie Gould kick), 9:04. Cardinals 34–21. Drive: 3 plays, 28 yards, 0:52.
- ARI – Steve Breaston 4-yard pass from Kurt Warner (Neil Rackers kick), 4:30. Cardinals 41–21. Drive: 4 plays, 17 yards, 2:11.

Top passers

- ARI – Kurt Warner – 22/32, 261 yards, 5 TD
- CHI – Jay Cutler – 29/47, 369 yards, 3 TD, INT

Top rushers

- ARI – Tim Hightower – 15 rushes, 77 yards
- CHI – Matt Forte – 5 rushes, 33 yards

Top receivers

- ARI – Larry Fitzgerald – 9 receptions, 123 yards, 2 TD
- CHI – Devin Hester – 6 receptions, 94 yards

Hoping to rebound from their home loss to the Panthers, the Cardinals flew to Soldier Field for a Week 9 duel with the Chicago Bears. Arizona would deliver the opening strike in the first quarter as quarterback Kurt Warner completed an 11-yard touchdown pass to wide receiver Larry Fitzgerald. The Bears would respond with quarterback Jay Cutler hooking up with tight end Greg Olsen on a 33-yard touchdown pass, yet the Cardinals would answer with Warner finding tight end Ben Patrick on a 6-yard touchdown pass. In the second quarter, Arizona would unleash a firestorm as Warner found Fitzgerald again on a 17-yard touchdown pass, followed by tight end Anthony Becht on a 15-yard touchdown pass. Afterwards, the Cardinals would close out the half with a 43-yard field goal by kicker Neil Rackers.

In the third quarter, Arizona would get the period's only points as Rackers booted a 30-yard field goal. Chicago would begin to rally in the fourth quarter as Cutler found Olsen again on a 3-yard and a 20-yard touchdown, yet the Cards closed out the game with Warner hooking up with wide receiver Steve Breaston on a 4-yard touchdown pass.

With the win, the Cardinals improved to 5–3.

=== Week 10: vs. Seattle Seahawks ===
Week 10: Seattle Seahawks at Arizona Cardinals – Game summary

Quarter	1	2	3	4	Total
Seahawks	7	10	0	3	20
Cardinals	0	10	7	14	31

at University of Phoenix Stadium, Glendale, Arizona

- Date: November 15
- Game time: 2:15 p.m. MST
- Game weather: None (retractable roof closed)
- Game attendance: 62,278
- Referee: Walt Coleman
- TV announcers (Fox): Dick Stockton and Charles Davis
- Box Score

Game information

First quarter

- SEA – Justin Forsett 11-yard run (Olindo Mare kick), 0:20. Seahawks 7–0. Drive: 6 plays, 99 yards, 2:32.

Second quarter

- SEA – John Carlson 31-yard pass from Matt Hasselbeck (Olindo Mare kick), 8:29. Seahawks 14–0. Drive: 5 plays, 54 yards, 1:27.
- ARI – Steve Breaston 28-yard pass from Kurt Warner (Neil Rackers kick), 5:30. Seahawks 14–7. Drive: 6 plays, 65 yards, 2:59.
- SEA – Olindo Mare 32-yard field goal, 1:09. Seahawks 17–7. Drive: 12 plays, 67 yards, 4:21.
- ARI – Neil Rackers 27-yard field goal, 0:00. Seahawks 17–10. Drive: 8 plays, 71 yards, 1:09.

Third quarter

- ARI – Beanie Wells 10-yard run (Neil Rackers kick), 8:13. Tied 17–17. Drive: 13 plays, 82 yards, 6:47.

Fourth quarter

- SEA – Olindo Mare 20-yard field goal, 13:02. Seahawks 20–17. Drive: 13 plays, 91 yards, 5:30.
- ARI – Beanie Wells 13-yard run (Olindo Mare kick), 11:20. Cardinals 24–20. Drive: 4 plays, 80 yards, 1:42.
- ARI – Larry Fitzgerald 18-yard pass from Kurt Warner (Neil Rackers kick), 6:11. Cardinals 31–20. Drive: 6 plays, 85 yards, 3:14.

Top passers

- SEA – Matt Hasselbeck – 26/52, 315 yards, TD, 2 INT
- ARI – Kurt Warner – 29/38, 340 yards, 2 TD

Top rushers

- SEA – Justin Forsett – 17 rushes, 123 yards, TD
- ARI – Beanie Wells – 16 rushes, 85 yards, 2 TD

Top receivers

- SEA – T. J. Houshmandzadeh – 9 receptions, 165 yards
- ARI – Anquan Boldin – 8 receptions, 105 yards

Coming off their dominating road win over the Bears, the Cardinals went home for a Week 10 NFC West rematch with the Seattle Seahawks. Arizona would trail in the first quarter as Seahawks running back Justin Forsett got a 20-yard touchdown run. In the second quarter, Seattle would increase their lead as quarterback Matt Hasselbeck found tight end John Carlson on a 31-yard touchdown pass. The Cardinals would get on the board with quarterback Kurt Warner's 28-yard touchdown pass to wide receiver Steve Breaston, but the Seahawks answered with kicker Olindo Mare getting a 32-yad field goal. Arizona would end the half with a 27-yard field goal from kicker Neil Rackers.

The Cardinals would tie the game in the third quarter with a 10-yard touchdown run from rookie running back Chris "Beanie" Wells. Seattle tried to take control in the fourth quarter with Mare booting a 20-yard field goal, yet Arizona came out on top as Wells picked up a 13-yard touchdown run and Warner connected with wide receiver Larry Fitzgerald on an 18-yard touchdown pass.

With the win, the Cardinals improved to 6–3.

=== Week 11: at St. Louis Rams ===
Week 11: Arizona Cardinals at St. Louis Rams – Game summary

Quarter	1	2	3	4	Total
Cardinals	7	14	0	0	21
Rams	3	0	3	7	13

at Edward Jones Dome, St. Louis, Missouri

- Date: November 22
- Game time: 3:05 p.m. CST/2:05 p.m. MST
- Game weather: None (indoor stadium)
- Game attendance: 59,839
- Referee: Bill Leavy
- TV announcers (Fox): Ron Pitts and John Lynch
- Box Score

Game information

First quarter

- STL – Josh Brown 40-yard field goal, 12:20. Rams 3–0. Drive: 4 plays, 3 yards, 1:11.
- ARI – Anquan Boldin 5-yard pass from Kurt Warner (Neil Rackers kick), 2:28. Cardinals 7–3. Drive: 6 plays, 87 yards, 3:00.

Second quarter

- ARI – Larry Fitzgerald 11-yard pass from Kurt Warner (Neil Rackers kick), 11:48. Cardinals 14–3. Drive: 9 plays, 90 yards, 4:09.
- ARI – Beanie Wells 1-yard run (Neil Rackers kick), 2:23. Cardinals 21–3. Drive: 9 plays, 78 yards, 4:50.

Third quarter

- STL – Josh Brown 20-yard field goal, 0:13. Cardinals 21–6. Drive: 9 plays, 77 yards, 4:36.

Fourth quarter

- STL – Steven Jackson 1-yard run (Josh Brown kick), 7:08. Cardinals 21–13. Drive: 12 plays, 44 yards, 4:47.

Top passers

- ARI – Kurt Warner – 15/19, 203 yards, 2 TD
- STL – Marc Bulger – 19/37, 215 yards, INT

Top rushers

- ARI – Tim Hightower – 14 rushes, 110 yards
- STL – Steven Jackson – 24 rushes, 116 yards, TD

Top receivers

- ARI – Anquan Boldin – 8 receptions, 103 yards, TD
- STL – Donnie Avery – 4 receptions, 65 yards

Looking to improve to 5–0 on the road, the Cardinals went to their former home for a Week 11 duel against divisional rival St. Louis Rams. The Rams would score first, on a Josh Brown field goal following a fumble by Chris "Beanie" Wells. However, the Cardinals would score the next 21 points, as Kurt Warner connected with Anquan Boldin for a touchdown at the end of the first quarter, followed by a Warner to Larry Fitzgerald touchdown and a Beanie Wells rushing touchdown in the second quarter.

During the second touchdown drive of the second quarter, Warner was hit hard by St. Louis safety O.J. Atogwe, with his head hitting the turf as he went down. Warner played the remaining six plays of the drive, but was replaced for the remainder of the game by backup quarterback Matt Leinart. Leinart struggled with a more conservative game throughout the second half, and the Cardinals did not score for the remainder of the game. St. Louis attempted to rally; however, they were only able to muster a second Josh Brown field goal and a Steven Jackson touchdown.

With the win, the Cardinals improved to 7–3; however, Warner's status remained questionable for the next week's game against the Tennessee Titans.

=== Week 12: at Tennessee Titans ===
Week 12: Arizona Cardinals at Tennessee Titans – Game summary

Quarter	1	2	3	4	Total
Cardinals	0	3	7	7	17
Titans	3	3	7	7	20

at LP Field, Nashville, Tennessee

- Date: November 29
- Game time: 4:15 p.m. EST/2:15 p.m. MST
- Game weather: Partly Cloudy, 59 °F (15 °C)
- Game attendance: 69,143
- Referee: Terry McAulay
- TV announcers (Fox): Sam Rosen, Tim Tyan and Charissa Thompson
- Box Score

Game information

First quarter

- TEN – Rob Bironas 52-yard field goal, 10:33. Titans 3–0. Drive: 5 plays, 31 yards, 2:52.

Second quarter

- TEN – Rob Bironas 24-yard field goal, 13:28. Titans 6–0. Drive: 14 plays, 89 yards, 8:55.
- ARI – Neil Rackers 41-yard field goal, 1:55. Titans 6–3. Drive: 11 plays, 55 yards, 5:58.

Third quarter

- TEN – Chris Johnson 85-yard run (Rob Bironas kick), 3:37. Titans 13–3. Drive: 2 plays, 85 yards, 0:19.
- ARI – LaRod Stephens-Howling 99-yard kickoff return (Neil Rackers kick), 3:25. Titans 13–10.

Fourth quarter

- ARI – Tim Hightower 6-yard run (Neil Rackers kick), 12:20. Cardinals 17–13. Drive: 9 plays, 80 yards, 4:21.
- TEN – Kenny Britt 10-yard pass from Vince Young (Rob Bironas kick), 0:00. Titans 20–17. Drive: 18 plays, 99 yards, 2:37.

Top passers

- ARI – Matt Leinart – 21/31, 220 yards
- TEN – Vince Young – 27/43, 387 yards, TD

Top rushers

- ARI – Tim Hightower – 11 rushes, 55 yards, TD
- TEN – Chris Johnson – 18 rushes, 154 yards, TD

Top receivers

- ARI – Anquan Boldin – 5 receptions, 53 yards
- TEN – Kenny Britt – 7 receptions, 128 yards, TD

With Kurt Warner on the sidelines due to injury, and in the tenth season since he won Super Bowl XXXIV over the Titans, the Cardinals fell to a game-winning rally led by quarterback Vince Young as he raced the Titans 99 yards down field over the final 2:37, converted two fourth downs, and fired the winning ten-yard touchdown on the final play to Kenny Britt. The win made the Titans the first team to win five straight after starting 0–6 as they improved to 5–6 while the Cardinals fell to 7–4.

=== Week 13: vs. Minnesota Vikings ===
Week 13: Minnesota Vikings at Arizona Cardinals – Game summary

Quarter	1	2	3	4	Total
Vikings	7	3	0	7	17
Cardinals	7	14	6	3	30

at University of Phoenix Stadium, Glendale, Arizona

- Date: December 6
- Game time: 6:20 p.m. MST
- Game weather: None (retractable roof closed)
- Game attendance: 64,121
- Referee: John Parry
- TV announcers (NBC): Al Michaels, Cris Collinsworth and Andrea Kremer
- Box Score

Game information

First quarter

- MIN – Visanthe Shiancoe 3-yard pass from Brett Favre (Ryan Longwell kick), 9:47. Vikings 7–0. Drive: 10 plays, 47 yards, 4:25.
- ARI – Anquan Boldin 2-yard pass from Kurt Warner (Neil Rackers kick), 4:49. Tied 7–7. Drive: 1 play, 2 yards, 0:03.

Second quarter

- ARI – Anquan Boldin 39-yard pass from Kurt Warner (Neil Rackers kick), 7:42. Cardinals 14–7. Drive: 2 plays, 58 yards, 0:52.
- MIN – Ryan Longwell 25-yard field goal, 1:55. Cardinals 14–10. Drive: 10 plays, 62 yards, 5:47.
- ARI – Larry Fitzgerald 34-yard pass from Kurt Warner (Neil Rackers kick), 1:14. Cardinals 21–10. Drive: 5 plays, 77 yards, 0:41.

Third quarter

- ARI – Neil Rackers 31-yard field goal, 7:45. Cardinals 24–10.Drive: 10 plays, 46 yards, 4:34.
- ARI – Neil Rackers 30-yard field goal, 3:19. Cardinals 27–10. Drive: 5 plays, 32 yards, 1:51.

Fourth quarter

- ARI – Neil Rackers 29-yard field goal, 4:18. Cardinals 30–10. Drive: 10 plays, 69 yards, 5:34.
- MIN – Percy Harvin 31-yard pass from Brett Favre (Ryan Longwell kick), 1:20. Cardinals 30–17. Drive: 9 plays, 84 yards, 2:58.

Top passers

- MIN – Brett Favre – 30/45, 275 yards, 2 TD, 2 INT
- ARI – Kurt Warner – 22/32, 285 yards, 3 TD

Top rushers

- MIN – Percy Harvin – 2 rushes, 22 yards
- ARI – Tim Hightower – 6 rushes, 50 yards

Top receivers

- MIN – Percy Harvin – 6 receptions, 79 yards, TD
- ARI – Larry Fitzgerald – 8 receptions, 143 yards, TD

Week 13 saw the return of star quarterback Kurt Warner to the line-up. The Cardinals took off in the first half building a 24–10 lead. Warner played exceptionally well, throwing for three first half touchdowns on his way to a 285-yard effort. The defense stifled Favre and the Vikings and held Adrian Peterson to a season-low 19 yards. The Warner led offense propelled the Cards to a stunningly one-sided 30–17 victory.

With the win, the Cardinals improved to 8–4.

=== Week 14: at San Francisco 49ers ===
Week 14: Arizona Cardinals at San Francisco 49ers – Game summary

Quarter	1	2	3	4	Total
Cardinals	0	0	3	6	9
49ers	10	7	0	7	24

at Candlestick Park, San Francisco, California

- Date: December 14
- Game time: 5:40 p.m. PST/6:40 p.m. MST
- Game weather: Cloudy, 53 °F (12 °C)
- Game attendance: 69,732
- Referee: Jerome Boger
- TV announcers (ESPN): Mike Tirico, Ron Jaworski, Jon Gruden and Michele Tafoya
- Box Score

Game information

First quarter

- SF – Vernon Davis 5-yard pass from Alex Smith (Joe Nedney kick), 3:53. 49ers 7–0. Drive: 2 plays, 8 yards, 0:46.
- SF – Joe Nedney 37-yard field goal, 0:33. 49ers 10–0. Drive: 4 plays, 8 yards, 2:18.

Second quarter

- SF – Michael Crabtree 35-yard pass from Alex Smith (Neil Rackers kick), 0:52. 49ers 17–0. Drive: 7 plays, 68 yards, 1:53.

Third quarter

- ARI – Neil Rackers 48-yard field goal, 5:46. 49ers 17–3. Drive: 8 plays, 25 yards, 2:08.

Fourth quarter

- ARI – Beanie Wells 1-yard run (kick failed), 14:03. 49ers 17–9. Drive: 7 plays, 43 yards, 4:20.
- SF – Frank Gore 2-yard run (Neil Rackers kick), 9:22. 49ers 24–9. Drive: 4 plays, 16 yards, 2:13.

Top passers

- ARI – Kurt Warner – 16/29, 178 yards, 2 INT
- SF – Alex Smith – 19/35, 144 yards, 2 TD, 2 INT

Top rushers

- ARI – Beanie Wells – 15 rushes, 79 yards, TD
- SF – Frank Gore – 25 rushes, 167 yards, TD

Top receivers

- ARI – Early Doucet – 2 receptions, 41 yards
- SF – Michael Crabtree – 5 receptions, 67 yards, TD

=== Week 15: at Detroit Lions ===
Week 15: Arizona Cardinals at Detroit Lions – Game summary

Quarter	1	2	3	4	Total
Cardinals	7	10	0	14	31
Lions	0	0	17	7	24

at Ford Field, Detroit, Michigan

- Date: December 21
- Game time: 1:00 p.m. EST/11:00 a.m. MST
- Game weather: None (indoor stadium)
- Game attendance: 40,577
- Referee: Jeff Triplette
- TV announcers (Fox): Chris Myers and Tim Ryan
- Box Score

Game information

First quarter

- ARI – Larry Fitzgerald 1-yard pass from Kurt Warner (Mike Nugent kick), 1:37. Cardinals 7–0. Drive: 3 plays, 13 yards, 1:17.

Second quarter

- ARI – Mike Nugent 48-yard field goal, 13:01. Cardinals 10–0. Drive: 5 plays, 19 yards, 2:30.
- ARI – Tim Hightower 1-yard run (Mike Nugent kick), 3:51. Cardinals 17–0. Drive: 6 plays, 56 yards, 2:31.

Third quarter

- DET – Louis Delmas 100-yard interception return (Jason Hanson kick), 7:29. Cardinals 17–7.
- DET – Maurice Morris 64-yard run (Jason Hanson kick), 5:10. Cardinals 17–14. Drive: 1 play, 64 yards, 0:11.
- DET – Jason Hanson 37-yard field goal, 2:04. Tied 17–17. Drive: 5 plays, 44 yards, 1:32.

Fourth quarter

- ARI – Beanie Wells 18-yard run (Mike Nugent kick), 13:40. Cardinals 24–17. Drive: 8 plays, 75 yards, 3:24.
- DET – Drew Stanton 1-yard run (Jason Hanson kick), 3:48. Tied 24–24. Drive: 8 plays, 58 yards, 4:18.
- ARI – Anquan Boldin 5-yard run (Mike Nugent kick), 1:54. Cardinals 31–24. Drive: 5 plays, 58 yards, 1:54.

Top passers

- ARI – Kurt Warner – 22/36, 228 yards, TD, INT
- DET – Drew Stanton – 10/19, 72 yards, INT

Top rushers

- ARI – Beanie Wells – 17 rushes, 110 yards, TD
- DET – Maurice Morris – 17 rushes, 126 yards, TD

Top receivers

- ARI – Anquan Boldin – 5 receptions, 67 yards
- DET – Maurice Morris – 5 receptions, 35 yards

=== Week 16: vs. St. Louis Rams ===
Week 16: St. Louis Rams at Arizona Cardinals – Game summary

Quarter	1	2	3	4	Total
Rams	0	0	7	3	10
Cardinals	0	17	7	7	31

at University of Phoenix Stadium, Glendale, Arizona

- Date: December 27
- Game time: 2:05 p.m. MST
- Game weather: Sunny, 65 °F (18 °C) (retractable roof open)
- Game attendance: 62,624
- Referee: Alberto Riveron
- TV announcers (Fox): Sam Rosen and Tim Ryan
- Box Score

Game information

First quarter

- No scoring plays

Second quarter

- ARI – Larry Fitzgerald 10-yard pass from Kurt Warner (Mike Nugent kick), 12:13. Cardinals 7–0. Drive: 5 plays, 80 yards, 2:47.
- ARI – Early Doucet 18-yard pass from Kurt Warner (Mike Nugent kick), 6:48. Cardinals 14–0. Drive: 8 plays, 83 yards, 3:32.
- ARI – Mike Nugent 19-yard field goal, 0:08. Cardinals 17–0. Drive: 14 plays, 82 yards, 4:28.

Third quarter

- STL – Brandon Gibson 21-yard pass from Keith Null (Josh Brown kick), 10:43. Cardinals 17–7. Drive: 5 plays, 35 yards, 2:07.
- ARI – Tim Hightower 2-yard run (Mike Nugent kick), 4:32. Cardinals 24–7. Drive: 9 plays, 57 yards, 4:58.

Fourth quarter

- STL – Josh Brown 33-yard field goal, 8:36. Cardinals 24–10. Drive: 7 plays, 20 yards, 3:46.
- ARI – Beanie Wells 3-yard run (Mike Nugent kick), 2:44. Cardinals 31–10. Drive: 2 plays, 12 yards, 0:15.

Top passers

- STL – Keith Null – 20/31, 171 yards, TD, 3 INT
- ARI – Kurt Warner – 24/38, 313 yards, 2 TD

Top rushers

- STL – Chris Ogbonnaya – 9 rushes, 45 yards
- ARI – Beanie Wells – 17 rushes, 68 yards, TD

Top receivers

- STL – Brandon Gibson – 5 receptions, 51 yards, TD
- ARI – Anquan Boldin – 8 receptions, 116 yards

With this win, The Cardinals got their 10th win of the season. The last time the Cardinals had double digit wins in a season was in 1976.

=== Week 17: vs. Green Bay Packers ===
Week 17: Green Bay Packers at Arizona Cardinals – Game summary

Quarter	1	2	3	4	Total
Packers	14	12	7	0	33
Cardinals	0	0	0	7	7

at University of Phoenix Stadium, Glendale, Arizona

- Date: January 3
- Game time: 2:15 p.m. MST
- Game weather: None (retractable roof closed)
- Game attendance: 67,597
- Referee: Carl Cheffers
- TV announcers (Fox): Sam Rosen and Tim Ryan
- Box Score

Game information

First quarter

- GB – Ryan Grant 1-yard run (Mason Crosby kick), 8:45. Packers 7–0. Drive: 10 plays, 69 yards, 6:15.
- GB – Aaron Rodgers 1-yard run (Mason Crosby kick), 2:41. Packers 14–0. Drive: 6 plays, 86 yards, 3:19.

Second quarter

- GB – Team safety, 12:33. Packers 16–0.
- GB – Mason Crosby 26-yard field goal, 6:33. Packers 19–0. Drive: 11 plays, 53 yards, 6:00.
- GB – Charles Woodson 45-yard interception return (Mason Crosby kick), 4:31. Packers 26–0.

Third quarter

- GB – Jermichael Finley 5-yard pass from Aaron Rodgers (Mason Crosby kick), 4:16. Packers 33–0. Drive: 14 plays, 94 yards, 7:31.

Fourth quarter

- ARI – Larry Fitzgerald 3-yard pass from Brian St. Pierre (Neil Rackers kick), 2:59. Packers 33–7. Drive: 1 play, 3 yards, 0:05.

Top passers

- GB – Aaron Rodgers – 21/26, 235 yards, TD
- ARI – Matt Leinart – 13/21, 96 yards, 2 INT

Top rushers

- GB – Ryan Grant – 11 rushes, 51 yards, TD
- ARI – Tim Hightower – 6 rushes, 24 yards

Top receivers

- GB – Donald Driver – 6 receptions, 65 yards
- ARI – Anquan Boldin – 3 receptions, 38 yards

With the Vikings win earlier in the day, this game was rendered unimportant. The Cardinals pulled Kurt Warner along with other starters early in the 2nd quarter while the Packers continued to play their starters until the 4th quarter. Late in the 4th quarter, quarterback Brian St. Pierre threw his first career touchdown pass.

== Post season results ==
=== Schedule ===
Round	Date	Opponent (seed)	Result	Record	Venue	Game Recap
Wild Card	January 10, 2010	Green Bay Packers (5)	W 51–45 (OT)	1–0	University of Phoenix Stadium	Recap
Divisional	January 16, 2010	at New Orleans Saints (1)	L 14–45	1–1	Louisiana Superdome	Recap

==== NFC Wild Card Playoffs: vs. (5) Green Bay Packers ====
NFC Wild Card Playoffs: (5) Green Bay Packers at (4) Arizona Cardinals – Game summary

Quarter	1	2	3	4	OT	Total
Packers	0	10	14	21	0	45
Cardinals	17	7	14	7	6	51

at University of Phoenix Stadium, Glendale, Arizona

- Date: January 10, 2010
- Game time: 2:30 p.m. MST
- Game weather: None (retractable roof closed)
- Game attendance: 61,926
- Referee: Scott Green
- TV announcers (Fox): Joe Buck, Troy Aikman, Pam Oliver and Chris Myers
- Box Score

Game information

First quarter

- ARI – Tim Hightower 1-yard run (Neil Rackers kick), 11:04. Cardinals 7–0. Drive: 7 plays, 40 yards, 3:38.
- ARI – Early Doucet 15-yard pass from Kurt Warner (Neil Rackers kick), 9:16. Cardinals 14–0. Drive: 2 plays, 22 yards, 0:48.
- ARI – Neil Rackers 23-yard field goal, 0:34. Cardinals 17–0. Drive: 9 plays, 54 yards, 5:20.

Second quarter

- GB – Aaron Rodgers 1-yard run (Mason Crosby kick), 6:52. Cardinals 17–7. Drive: 6 plays, 52 yards, 4:14.
- ARI – Early Doucet 15-yard pass from Kurt Warner (Neil Rackers kick), 2:16. Cardinals 24–7. Drive: 8 plays, 79 yards, 4:36.
- GB – Mason Crosby 20-yard field goal, 0:00. Cardinals 24–10. Drive: 8 plays, 73 yards, 2:16.

Third quarter

- ARI – Larry Fitzgerald 33-yard pass from Kurt Warner (Neil Rackers kick), 11:15. Cardinals 31–10. Drive: 6 plays, 80 yards, 3:45.
- GB – Greg Jennings 6-yard pass from Aaron Rodgers (Mason Crosby kick), 7:20. Cardinals 31–17. Drive: 10 plays, 80 yards, 3:55.
- GB – Jordy Nelson 11-yard pass from Aaron Rodgers (Mason Crosby kick), 4:07. Cardinals 31–24. Drive: 8 plays, 57 yards, 3:13.
- ARI – Larry Fitzgerald 11-yard pass from Kurt Warner (Neil Rackers kick), 2:34. Cardinals 38–24. Drive: 3 plays, 73 yards, 1:33.

Fourth quarter

- GB – James Jones 30-yard pass from Aaron Rodgers (Mason Crosby kick), 14:08. Cardinals 38–31. Drive: 8 plays, 80 yards, 3:26.
- GB – John Kuhn 1-yard run (Mason Crosby kick), 10:57. Tied 38–38. Drive: 3 plays, 67 yards, 0:56.
- ARI – Steve Breaston 17-yard pass from Kurt Warner (Neil Rackers kick), 4:55. Cardinals 45–38. Drive: 11 plays, 80 yards, 6:02.
- GB – Spencer Havner 11-yard pass from Aaron Rodgers (Mason Crosby kick), 1:52. Tied 45–45. Drive: 7 plays, 71 yards, 3:03.

Overtime

- ARI – Karlos Dansby 17-yard fumble return, 13:42. Cardinals 51–45.

Top passers

- GB – Aaron Rodgers – 28/42, 423 yards, 4 TD, INT
- ARI – Kurt Warner – 29/33, 379 yards, 5 TD

Top rushers

- GB – Ryan Grant – 11 rushes, 64 yards
- ARI – Beanie Wells – 14 rushes, 91 yards

Top receivers

- GB – Jermichael Finley – 6 receptions, 159 yards
- ARI – Steve Breaston – 7 receptions, 125 yards, TD

Entering the postseason as the NFC's #4 seed, the Cardinals began their playoff run at home in the NFC Wild Card game against the #5 Green Bay Packers, looking to avenge their Week 17 defeat.

Arizona would take advantage of some Packer turnovers early in the first quarter by turning them into a 1-yard touchdown run for running back Tim Hightower and quarterback Kurt Warner's 15-yard touchdown pass to wide receiver Early Doucet. The Cardinals would also add a 23-yard field goal from kicker Neil Rackers. Green Bay would reply in the second quarter with quarterback Aaron Rodgers getting a 1-yard touchdown run, yet Arizona went right back to work as Warner found Doucet again on a 15-yard touchdown pass. The Packers would end the half with a 20-yard field goal from kicker Mason Crosby.

In the third quarter, the Cardinals went back to work as Warner found wide receiver Larry Fitzgerald on a 33-yard touchdown pass, but Green Bay would answer with Rodgers completing a 6-yard touchdown pass to wide receiver Greg Jennings followed by a 10-yard touchdown pass to wide receiver Jordy Nelson. Arizona continued to show off its offense firepower as Warner hooked up with Fitzgerald again on an 11-yard touchdown pass. The Packers would tie the game in the fourth quarter as Rodgers would complete a 30-yard touchdown pass to wide receiver James Jones, followed by fullback John Kuhn's 1-yard touchdown run. The Cardinals' offense continued to flex its muscles as Warner found wide receiver Steve Breaston on a 17-yard touchdown pass. Just then, Green Bay would tie the game again as Rodgers would complete an 11-yard touchdown pass to tight end Spencer Havner. The Cardinals drove down field in the final minutes, but a 34-yard field goal try by Neil Rackers with nine seconds remaining sailed wide left, forcing overtime.

Arizona's defense would rise to the occasion in overtime as linebacker Karlos Dansby recovered a fumble and ran it back 17 yards for the game-winning touchdown.

With the win, the Cardinals improved to overall record to 11–6.

The 96 combined points between both teams would become the highest point total in an NFL postseason game. Cardinals got hot winning 51-45, but lost to the Super Bowl Champion Saints 45-14.

==== NFC Divisional Playoffs: at (1) New Orleans Saints ====
NFC Divisional Playoffs: (4) Arizona Cardinals at (1) New Orleans Saints – Game summary

Quarter	1	2	3	4	Total
Cardinals	7	7	0	0	14
Saints	21	14	10	0	45

at Louisiana Superdome, New Orleans, Louisiana

- Date: January 16, 2010
- Game time: 3:30 p.m. CST/2:30 p.m. MST
- Game weather: None (indoor stadium)
- Game attendance: 70,149
- Referee: Ron Winter
- TV announcers (Fox): Kenny Albert, Daryl Johnston and Tony Siragusa
- Box Score

Game information

First quarter

- ARI – Tim Hightower 70-yard run (Neil Rackers kick), 14:41. Cardinals 7–0. Drive: 1 play, 70 yards, 0:19.
- NO – Lynell Hamilton 1-yard run (Garrett Hartley kick), 9:17. Tied 7–7. Drive: 10 plays, 72 yards, 5:24.
- NO – Jeremy Shockey 17-yard pass from Drew Brees (Garrett Hartley kick), 7:02. Saints 14–7. Drive: 4 plays, 37 yards, 1:58.
- NO – Reggie Bush 46-yard run (Garrett Hartley kick), 2:31. Saints 21–7. Drive: 5 plays, 77 yards, 2:54.

Second quarter

- ARI – Beanie Wells 4-yard run (Neil Rackers kick), 9:40. Saints 21–14. Drive: 9 plays, 80 yards, 5:07.
- NO – Devery Henderson 44-yard pass from Drew Brees (Garrett Hartley kick), 6:48. Saints 28–14. Drive: 6 plays, 83 yards, 2:52.
- NO – Marques Colston 2-yard pass from Drew Brees (Garrett Hartley kick), 1:10. Saints 35–14. Drive: 8 plays, 27 yards, 4:38.

Third quarter

- NO – Garrett Hartley 43-yard field goal, 8:26. Saints 38–14. Drive: 6 plays, 39 yards, 2:10.
- NO – Reggie Bush 83-yard punt return (Neil Rackers kick), 6:42. Saints 45–14.

Fourth quarter

- No scoring plays

Top passers

- ARI – Kurt Warner – 17/26, 205 yards, INT
- NO – Drew Brees – 23/32, 247 yards, 3 TD

Top rushers

- ARI – Tim Hightower – 6 rushes, 87 yards, TD
- NO – Reggie Bush – 5 rushes, 84 yards, TD

Top receivers

- ARI – Larry Fitzgerald – 6 receptions, 77 yards
- NO – Marques Colston – 6 receptions, 83 yards, TD

Coming off their shootout win over the Packers, the Cardinals flew to the Louisiana Superdome for the NFC Divisional Round against the top-seeded New Orleans Saints. On their very first offensive play of the game, Arizona came out fast as running back Tim Hightower got a 70-yard touchdown run. The Saints would hugely respond with running back Lynell Hamilton getting a 1-yard touchdown run, followed by quarterback Drew Brees completing a 17-yard touchdown pass to tight end Jeremy Shockey, along with running back Reggie Bush getting a 54-yard touchdown run. In the second quarter, the Cardinals would come right back as rookie running back Chris "Beanie" Wells got a 4-yard touchdown run. However, New Orleans came right back as Brees threw a 44-yard touchdown pass to wide receiver Devery Henderson and a 2-yard touchdown pass to wide receiver Marques Colston.

The Saints would add onto their lead in the third quarter with a 43-yard field goal from kicker Garrett Hartley, followed by an 83-yard punt return for a touchdown by Bush. Arizona tried to rally, but New Orleans' defense continued to shut down any possible comeback, effectively sealing a Cardinals blowout.

With the loss, the Cardinals' season ended with an overall record of 11–7. Saints won Super Bowl XLIV to the Colts 31-17 to win their first Super Bowl. In 2010 the Cardinals missed the playoffs their first time in 3 years with a record of 5–11.
