= 2009 NFC Wild Card playoff game (Green Bay–Arizona) =

2010 NFL postseason game

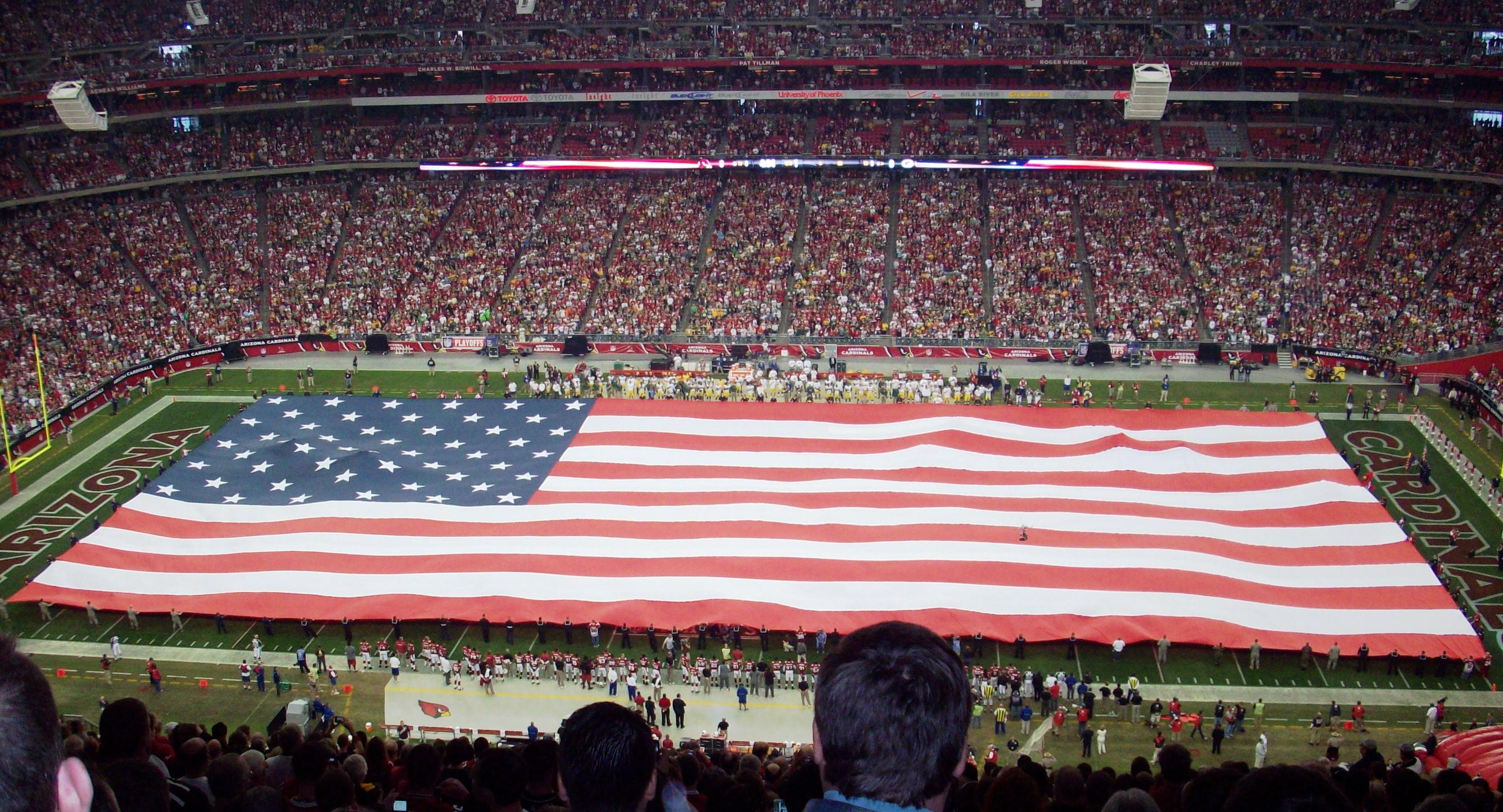
- The presentation of the flag and singing of The Star-Spangled Banner before the start of the Wild Card game
| Green Bay Packers (5) (11–5) | Arizona Cardinals (4) (10–6) |
|---|---|
| 45 | 51 |
| Head coach: Mike McCarthy | Head coach: Ken Whisenhunt |
| | 1 | 2 | 3 | 4 | OT | Total |
|---|---|---|---|---|---|---|
| GB | 0 | 10 | 14 | 21 | 0 | 45 |
| ARI | 17 | 7 | 14 | 7 | 6 | 51 |
- Date: January 10, 2010
- Stadium: University of Phoenix Stadium; Glendale, Arizona
- Favorite: Packers by 1
- Referee: Scott Green
- Attendance: 61,926

TV in the United States
- Network: Fox
- Announcers: Joe Buck, Troy Aikman, Pam Oliver, and Chris Myers

The 2009 National Football Conference (NFC) Wild Card playoff game was a National Football League (NFL) Wild Card playoff game between the Green Bay Packers and Arizona Cardinals on January 10, 2010. The game, which was contested at University of Phoenix Stadium in Glendale, Arizona, United States, became notable due to its high score, which set numerous NFL playoff records, as well as its dramatic conclusion in overtime. The Cardinals, who went to the Super Bowl the previous season, hosted the Packers after winning the NFC West, with the Packers making the playoffs as a Wild Card team. It was the first playoff start for Packers quarterback Aaron Rodgers.

The Cardinals dominated early, jumping to a 17–0 lead in the first quarter after two Packers turnovers. The Packers finally responded in the second quarter with their first score, a short rushing touchdown. However, the Cardinals struck back, with Kurt Warner throwing his second touchdown pass of the game to restore the Cardinals' 17-point lead. The Packers kicked a short field goal as time expired in the first half to cut the deficit to 24–10. Each team scored two touchdowns in the third quarter, all on touchdown passes. The Packers, down by 14 going into the fourth quarter, tied the game at 38–38 after a successful onside kick helped them score back-to-back touchdowns. Each team exchanged touchdowns again, leaving the score tied, 45–45. Cardinals kicker Neil Rackers missed a short field goal at the end of the fourth quarter, forcing overtime.

The Packers received the ball first in the overtime period. On the first play of overtime, Rodgers overthrew an open Greg Jennings on what could have been a game-winning score. One play later, Rodgers snapped the ball and was sacked by Cardinals defensive back Michael Adams as he was about to throw. The ball came loose, bounced off of Rodgers' foot and fell right to Karlos Dansby, who returned the fumble 17 yards for a touchdown to win the game. There was some controversy on the final play, with replays showing Adams grabbing Rodgers' face mask during the sack, although the play stood and the Cardinals won. At the time, the game set the NFL playoff record for most points (96), touchdowns (13), and first downs (62), while ranking third in total yards (1,024). In 2019, on the occasion of the NFL's 100th anniversary, the league ranked this game as the 47th best in its history.

== Background ==
The Green Bay Packers made the playoffs in Aaron Rodgers' second season as the team's starting quarterback. After starting the season with a record of 4–4, the Packers went 7–1 in their last 8 games, finishing in second place in the NFC North with a record of 11–5. This included a 33–7 victory over the Arizona Cardinals in the last game of the regular season. Their record was good enough to earn them the fifth seed in the playoffs, a Wild Card spot. The Packers finished the season in the top 10 for offense and defense, with Rodgers throwing 30 touchdowns and over 4,400 passing yards. Charles Woodson anchored the defense, winning AP NFL Defensive Player of the Year, while being named to the Pro Bowl and selected as first-team All-Pro.

The Cardinals, who lost Super Bowl XLIII the previous season, won the NFC West for the second consecutive year with a record of 10–6. Their record was good enough for the fourth seed in the playoffs, and as the division winner, the right to host the Wild Card playoff game. The Cardinals were led by quarterback Kurt Warner, who had two wide receivers, Anquan Boldin and Larry Fitzgerald, reach 1,000 yards receiving for the season. As the host, the Packers and Cardinals Wild Card game was scheduled to be played on January 10, 2010, at University of Phoenix Stadium in Glendale, Arizona. The Packers were favored to win by one point.

== Game summary ==
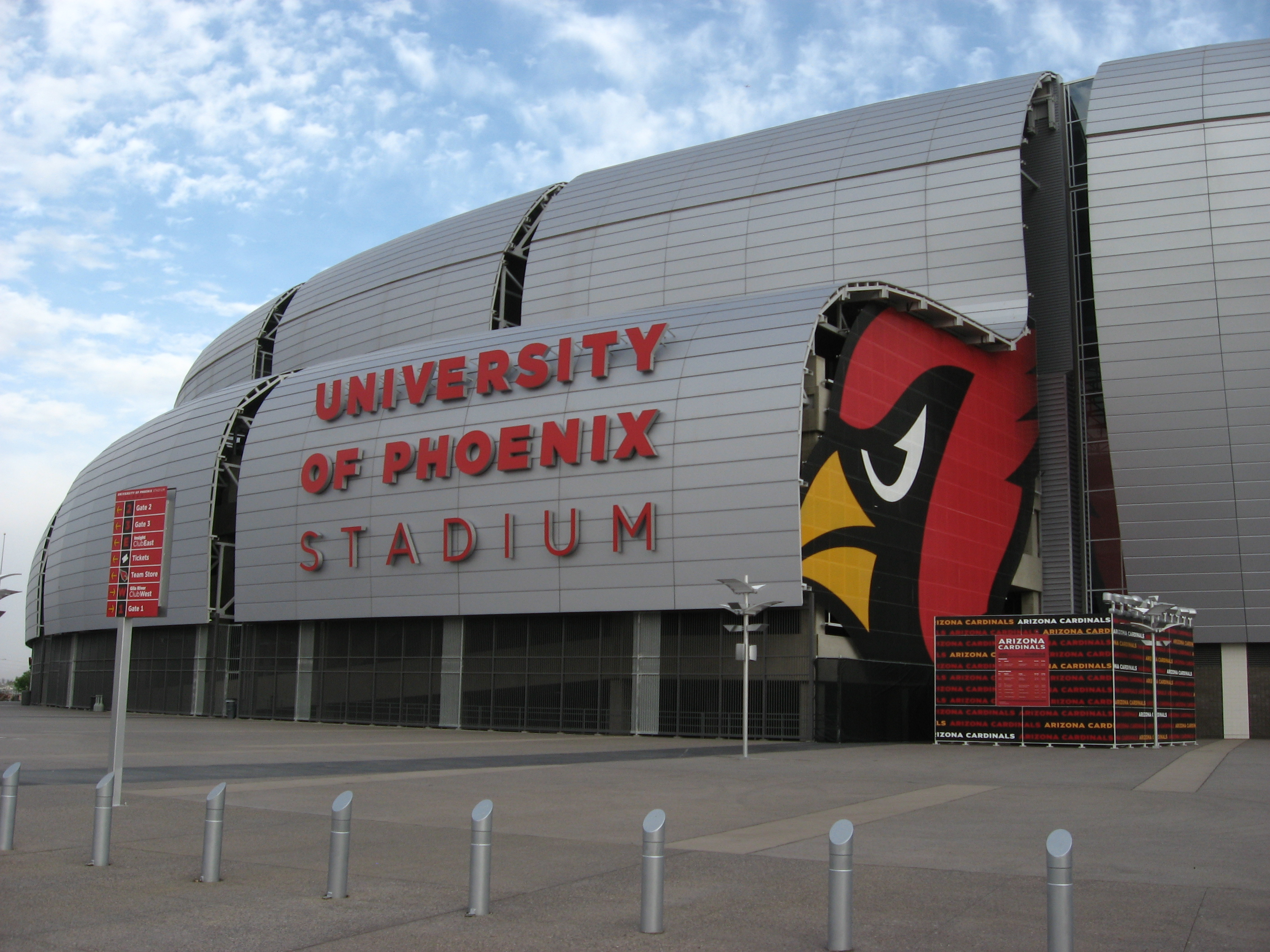
University of Phoenix Stadium, shown here in 2009, was the site of the Wild Card game.

=== First half ===
The Packers started the game with the ball. On the first play of the drive, Rodgers threw an interception to Dominique Rodgers-Cromartie. On the ensuing drive, the Cardinals drove from mid-field to score the game's first touchdown, with Tim Hightower scoring on a one-yard rush. The Packers got the ball back, with Ryan Grant rushing 10 yards for a first down on the first play of drive. The next play though, Rodgers threw a short pass to Donald Driver, who fumbled the ball, which was recovered by the Cardinals. With a short field, the Cardinals scored a second touchdown in just two plays, with Early Doucet catching a 15-yard touchdown pass from Warner. After a penalty on the kick-off return, the Packers started their third drive on the eight-yard line. The Packers only gained 20 yards before being forced to punt. On the next drive, the Cardinals quickly drove down into Packers territory, before the defense finally got a stop at the five-yard line, forcing a short field goal attempt. The successful attempt increased the Cardinals lead to 17–0. The Packers had an early 27-yard catch from Rodgers to Greg Jennings, but their drive stalled and they attempted a 54-yard field goal, which Mason Crosby missed, wide right. The Cardinals had a 28-yard rush from Steve Breaston, but on the third play of the drive Warner threw a short pass to Fitzgerald, who fumbled the ball. Clay Matthews III recovered it and advanced the ball to mid-field.

The Packers scored six plays later, with a defensive pass interference penalty on third down extending their drive, allowing Rodgers to score on a one-yard rush. The Cardinals got the ball back and drove 61 yards in 8 plays, finishing off the drive with another touchdown pass from Warner to Doucet. The touchdown brought the Cardinals lead back to 17 points, with the score at 24–7. The Packers got the ball with just over two minutes left in the half. On the third play of the drive, Rodgers completed back-to-back passes to Jermichael Finley, with the first going for 44 yards and the second going for 17 yards. The Packers had a first down and goal on the nine-yard line with just under a minute left until halftime. Rodgers completed two short passes, before being sacked on third down. The Cardinals were called for a penalty for horse-collar tackle, which gave the Packers a first down. But with only four seconds left in the half, the Packers settled for a field goal attempt, which was successful. The score was 24–10 at halftime.

=== Second half ===
The Cardinals began the second half with the ball and drove down for a quick touchdown, with Warner throwing a 33-yard touchdown pass to Fitzgerald. The extra point extended the Cardinals lead to 31–10. The Packers executed a similar drive, going 80 yards in 10 plays, with Rodgers attempting nine passes on the drive. Rodgers completed a 6-yard pass to Jennings for the score, bringing the Cardinals lead back to 14 points. On the ensuing kick-off, the Packers executed an onside kick, which was recovered by Brandon Underwood and allowed the Packers to retain possession of the ball. During their drive, the Packers faced fourth down with one yard to go and converted for a first down. They scored with another Rodgers touchdown pass, this time to Jordy Nelson. The score cut the Cardinals' lead to 31–24. The Cardinals struck back quickly though, with Beanie Wells executing a 42-yard run in the middle of the drive. The Cardinals scored again on a Warner-to-Fitzgerald touchdown pass, bringing the score to 38–24. On the ensuing drive, the Packers, still leaning heavily on the passing game, drove down 80 yards in 8 plays, capped off by a 30-yard touchdown pass from Rodgers to James Jones. With the score at 38–31, the Packers defense finally forced a punt on the next Cardinals drive. After the punt, Rodgers connected on back-to-back passes to Finley and Drive for 38 yards and 28 yards, respectively. On the third play of the drive, John Kuhn ran in a one-yard rush for a touchdown, tying the game at 38–38. The teams exchanged touchdown drives, with the Cardinals going 80 yards in 11 plays and Packers going 71 yards in 7 plays. Each team scored on a touchdown pass, with Breaston scoring for the Cardinals and Spencer Havner scoring for the Packers. With under two minutes left in the game and the score tied at 45–45, the Cardinals quickly drove down into field goal range. With 14 seconds on the clock, Neil Rackers attempted a 34-yard field goal. The kick went wide left and the Packers knelt the ball to force overtime.

=== Overtime ===
The Packers won the coin flip and chose to receive the ball. On the first offensive play, Rodgers threw a deep pass towards Jennings, who was open and had a chance to breakaway for a walk-off touchdown. However, Rodgers overthrew Jennings and the ball fell just a few yards in front of him. On third down, Rodgers snapped the ball and was pressured by Michael Adams as he was about to throw the ball. The ball was knocked loose, bounced off of Rodgers' foot, and fell right to Karlos Dansby, who returned the fumble 17 yards for a walk-off touchdown.

=== Box score ===
Green Bay Packers vs. Arizona Cardinals – Game summary

| Quarter | 1 | 2 | 3 | 4 | OT | Total |
|---|---|---|---|---|---|---|
| Packers | 0 | 10 | 14 | 21 | 0 | 45 |
| Cardinals | 17 | 7 | 14 | 7 | 6 | 51 |

at University of Phoenix Stadium, Glendale, Arizona

- Game time: 4:40 p.m. EST/2:40 p.m. MST
- Game weather: None (retractable roof closed)
- Game attendance: 61,926
- Referee: Scott Green (19)
- TV announcers (Fox): Joe Buck, Troy Aikman, Pam Oliver, and Chris Myers
- Sources: ESPN.com and Pro-Football-Reference.com

Game information

First quarter

- ARI – Tim Hightower 1-yard run (Neil Rackers kick), 11:04. Cardinals 7–0. Drive: 7 plays, 40 yards, 3:38.
- ARI – Early Doucet 15-yard pass from Kurt Warner (Neil Rackers kick), 9:16. Cardinals 14–0. Drive: 2 plays, 22 yards, 0:48.
- ARI – Neil Rackers 23-yard field goal, 0:34. Cardinals 17–0. Drive: 9 plays, 54 yards, 5:20.

Second quarter

- GB – Aaron Rodgers 1-yard run (Mason Crosby kick), 6:52. Cardinals 17–7. Drive: 6 plays, 52 yards, 4:14.
- ARI – Early Doucet 15-yard pass from Kurt Warner (Neil Rackers kick), 2:16. Cardinals 24–7. Drive: 8 plays, 79 yards, 4:36.
- GB – Mason Crosby 20-yard field goal, 0:00. Cardinals 24–10. Drive: 8 plays, 73 yards, 2:16.

Third quarter

- ARI – Larry Fitzgerald 33-yard pass from Kurt Warner (Neil Rackers kick), 11:15. Cardinals 31–10. Drive: 6 plays, 80 yards, 3:45.
- GB – Greg Jennings 6-yard pass from Aaron Rodgers (Mason Crosby kick), 7:20. Cardinals 31–17. Drive: 10 plays, 80 yards, 3:55.
- GB – Jordy Nelson 10-yard pass from Aaron Rodgers (Mason Crosby kick), 4:07. Cardinals 31–24. Drive: 8 plays, 57 yards, 3:13.
- ARI – Larry Fitzgerald 11-yard pass from Kurt Warner (Neil Rackers kick), 2:34. Cardinals 38–24. Drive: 3 plays, 73 yards, 1:33.

Fourth quarter

- GB – James Jones 30-yard pass from Aaron Rodgers (Mason Crosby kick), 14:08. Cardinals 38–31. Drive: 8 plays, 80 yards, 3:26.
- GB – John Kuhn 1-yard run (Mason Crosby kick), 10:57. Tied 38–38. Drive: 3 plays, 67 yards, 0:56.
- ARI – Steve Breaston 17-yard pass from Kurt Warner (Neil Rackers kick), 4:55. Cardinals 45–38. Drive: 11 plays, 80 yards, 6:02.
- GB – Spencer Havner 11-yard pass from Aaron Rodgers (Mason Crosby kick), 1:52. Tied 45–45. Drive: 7 plays, 71 yards, 3:03.

Overtime

- ARI – Karlos Dansby 17-yard fumble return, 13:42. Cardinals 51–45.

Green Bay Packers stats

Passing

- Aaron Rodgers – 28/42, 423 yards, 4 touchdowns, 1 interception

Rushing

- Ryan Grant – 11 rushes, 64 yards
- Aaron Rodgers – 3 rushes, 13 yards, 1 touchdown
- Ahman Green – 3 rushes, 5 yards
- Brandon Jackson – 2 rushes, 6 yards
- John Kuhn – 1 rush, 1 yard, 1 touchdown

Receiving

- Greg Jennings – 8 receptions, 130 yards, 1 touchdown
- Jermichael Finley – 6 receptions, 159 yards
- Donald Driver – 4 receptions, 43 yards
- James Jones – 3 receptions, 50 yards, 1 touchdown
- Ryan Grant – 2 receptions, 18 yards
- Spencer Havner – 2 receptions, 16 yards, 1 touchdown
- Jordy Nelson – 1 reception, 11 yards, 1 touchdown
- Brandon Jackson – 1 reception, -1 yards
- John Kuhn – 1 reception, -3 yards
Arizona Cardinals stats

Passing

- Kurt Warner – 29/33, 379 yards, 5 touchdowns

Rushing

- Beanie Wells – 14 rushes, 91 yards
- Tim Hightower – 7 rushes, 19 yards, 1 touchdown
- Steve Breaston – 1 rush, 28 yards
- LaRod Stephens-Howling – 1 rush, 18 yards

Receiving

- Steve Breaston – 7 receptions, 125 yards, 1 touchdown
- Larry Fitzgerald – 6 receptions, 82 yards, 2 touchdowns
- Early Doucet – 6 receptions, 77 yards, 2 touchdowns
- Ben Patrick – 3 receptions, 42 yards, 2 touchdowns
- Tim Hightower – 3 receptions, 21 yards
- LaRod Stephens-Howling – 3 receptions, 19 yards
- Jerheme Urban – 1 reception, 13 yards

=== Analysis ===
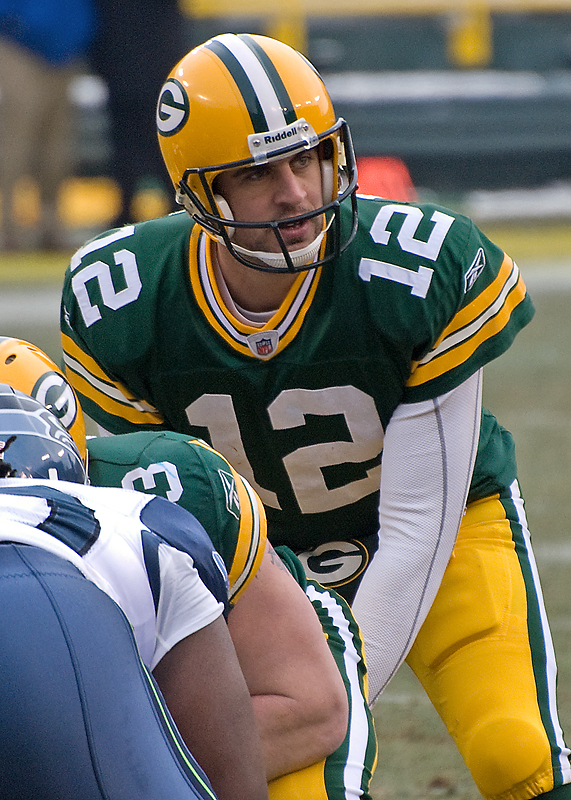
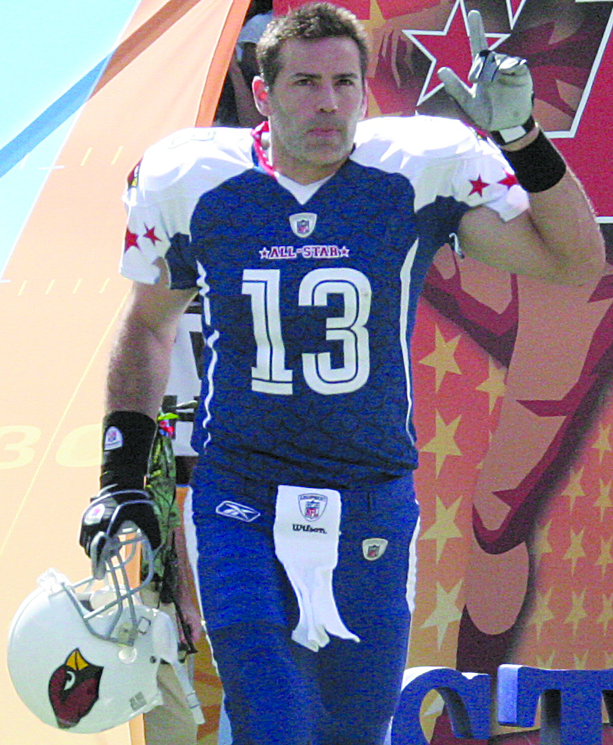
Aaron Rodgers (left) and Kurt Warner (right) combined for over 800 yards passing and 9 touchdown passes.

Post-game analysis focused on the record-setting offensive output by both teams. The 96 combined points, 13 combined touchdowns and 62 combined first downs set NFL playoff records at the time. The 1,024 combined total yards was the third most in NFL playoff history. The Packers also set numerous playoff team records, including most points (45), yards (493), and first downs (32). Each quarterback excelled, with Rodgers throwing for 423 yards and 4 touchdowns, while Warner threw for 379 yards and 5 touchdowns. Warner did outperform Rodgers on the turnover battle; Rodgers had a fumble lost and threw the aforementioned interception while Warner did not turn the ball over (the Packers had three total turnovers compared to just one by the Cardinals). A number of commentators noted the surprising failure of the Packers defense, which ranked second in total yards allowed, fifth in passing yards allowed, and recorded the most interceptions (30) of any team in the NFL that season. The Packers rush defense, which only gave up 83 yards a game on average, allowed the Cardinals to rush for 156 yards. They also had Woodson, the Defensive Player of the Year for the 2009 season, three defensive Pro Bowlers, and two defensive All-Pros.

Specific plays were also highlighted in post-game analysis. The aforementioned turnovers, which were uncharacteristic for the team, led to the Packers' early deficit. The Packers became more aggressive, including executing a successful onside kick and multiple fourth down conversions. The onside kick took the Cardinals by surprise, with no Cardinals player close to recovering the ball. The Packers offensive line also faltered, especially when it mattered most. On the second play of overtime, Daryn Colledge committed a costly penalty negating a long gain and likely first down. The Packers allowed Adams to rush free on Rodgers on the final play, forcing the game-winning fumble recovery. It was the Cardinals fifth sack of Rodgers in the game, the same amount that Rodgers was sacked in the Packers' previous four games combined. Although it did not end up impacting them, Rackers' miss at the end of the game was shocking, as it was relatively short and Rackers had only missed one field goal all season. Rodgers' overthrow of Jennings on the first play of overtime was also highlighted. A completion would have at least given the Packers the ball at mid-field and likely would have been a walk-off touchdown. Lastly, there was some controversy with a possible face mask penalty against the Cardinals on the final play that would negated the walk off touchdown and given the Packers a first down. The NFL noted after the game that the contact to Rodgers' face mask was incidental and determined that it did not include "twisting, turning or pulling" that would have justified a 15-yard penalty.

== Outcome ==
The Packers playoff appearance began a streak of eight straight seasons making the playoffs, all with Rodgers as the starting quarterback. The next season, the Packers made the playoffs as a Wild Card team again, however they strung together four straight victories in the playoffs to win Super Bowl XLV. The Cardinals advanced to the Divisional Round to play the New Orleans Saints. The Saints blew the Cardinals out, winning 45–14 in what would be the last playoff game for the Cardinals until 2014 and the last game of Warner's career.

=== Legacy ===
The game is best remembered for its high score and dramatic finish in overtime. It was only the second NFL playoff game to end on an overtime walk-off, defensive touchdown (the first such game also included the Packers in 2003). In honor of the NFL's 100th anniversary, the league recognized the game as the 47th best game in the league's history. The game also ended up being the last victory in Warner's Hall of Fame career, with his retirement coming during the following offseason after the Cardinals' blow-out loss to the Saints.

The Cardinals and Packers met again in the Divisional round six years later, with Rodgers still leading the Packers. That game, which was also hosted by the Cardinals at University of Phoenix Stadium, ended in a similarly dramatic fashion, with the Cardinals scoring on a walk-off touchdown in overtime. In what became known as the Hail Larry game, Rodgers completed a Hail Mary pass to tie the game at the end of the fourth quarter. In overtime, Fitzgerald caught a short pass from Cardinals quarterback Carson Palmer and ran to the five-yard line for a 75-yard catch. Two plays later, Fitzgerald scored the walk-off touchdown to send the Cardinals to the NFC Championship Game.
