= Tim Hightower =

American football player (born 1986)

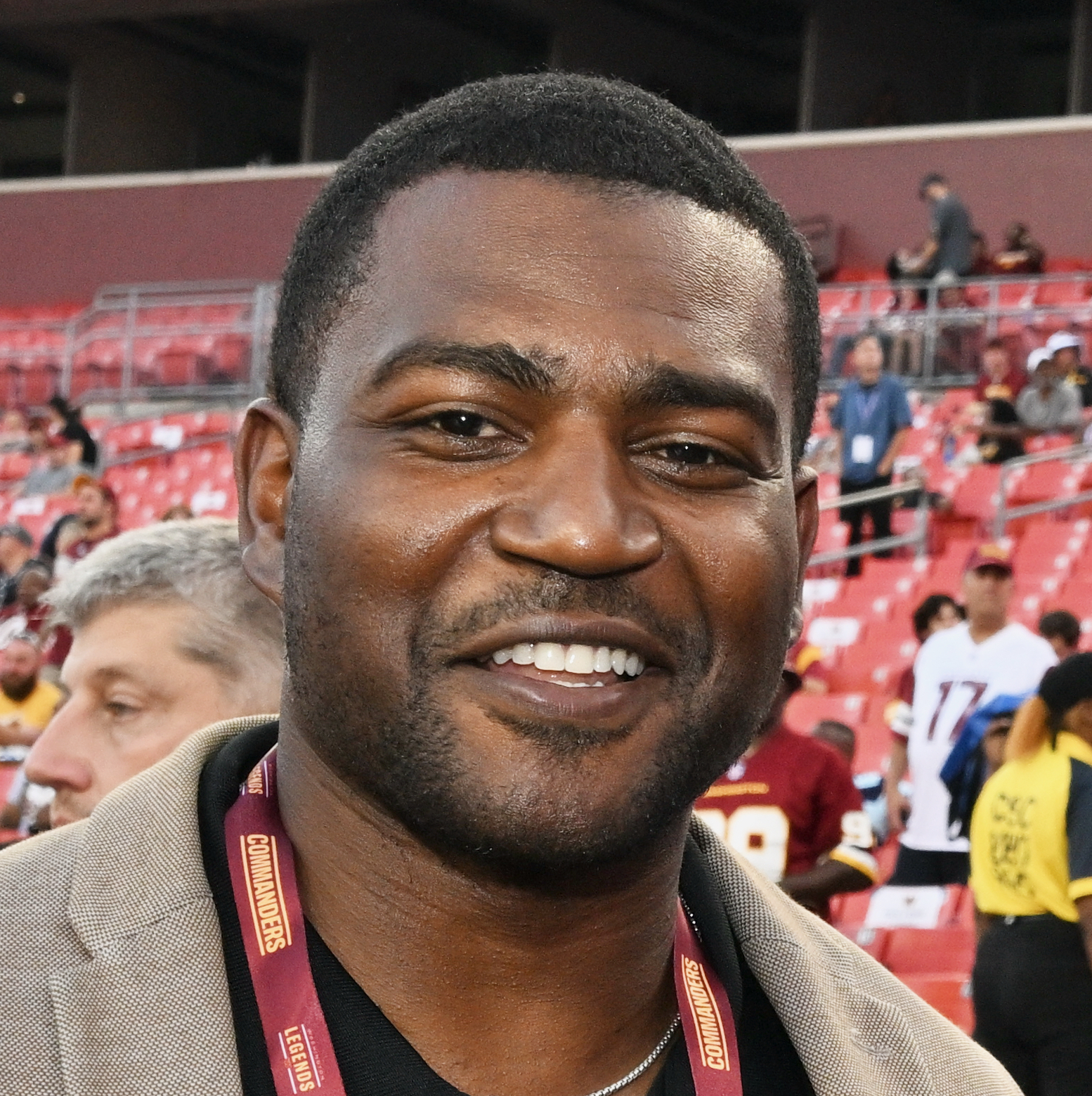
- Hightower in 2023

No. 34, 25
- Position: Running back

Personal information
- Born: May 23, 1986 (age 40); Waldorf, Maryland, U.S.
- Listed height: 6 ft 0 in (1.83 m)
- Listed weight: 220 lb (100 kg)

Career information
- High school: Episcopal (Alexandria, Virginia)
- College: Richmond (2004–2007)
- NFL draft: 2008: 5th round, 149th overall pick

Career history
- Arizona Cardinals (2008–2010); Washington Redskins (2011); FXFL Blacktips (2014); New Orleans Saints (2015–2016); San Francisco 49ers (2017)*
- * Offseason or practice squad member only

Career NFL statistics
- Rushing attempts: 752
- Rushing yards: 2,977
- Rushing touchdowns: 32
- Receptions: 162
- Receiving yards: 1,208
- Receiving touchdowns: 2
- Stats at Pro Football Reference

Timothy Michael Hightower (born May 23, 1986) is an American former professional football player who was a running back in the National Football League (NFL). He played college football for the Richmond Spiders and was selected by the Arizona Cardinals in the fifth round of the 2008 NFL draft. He was also a member of the Washington Redskins, Blacktips, New Orleans Saints, and San Francisco 49ers. Hightower has worked as the director of alumni relations for the Washington Commanders since 2020.

== Early life ==
Hightower grew up in Maryland and attended the Friendly High School, DeMatha Catholic High School and Westlake High School. He spent last two years of his high school at Episcopal High School in Alexandria, Virginia and gained 927 yards as a junior and 1,083 as a senior, despite playing only six games his final season, and on a injured foot.

== College career ==
As a true freshman at the University of Richmond in 2004, Hightower played in all 11 games for the Spiders and carried the ball 58 times for 161 yards. He also made 19 receptions for 158 yards. In his sophomore year, Hightower played in 13 games and started nine, rushing 142 times for 777 yards and nine touchdowns and catching 21 passes for 163 yards. He finished third on the team in scoring with 54 total points on nine touchdowns.

Starting all 11 games as a junior, Hightower posted career-highs in carries (177), rushing yards (850), receptions (34), receiving yards (269), and touchdown catches (2). He scored seven touchdowns and was a Third-team All-Atlantic 10 selection. In his senior season, Hightower set school season-records with 1,924 yards and 20 touchdowns, carrying the ball 327 times (5.9 avg). His average of 137.43 yards per game rushing led the league and ranked sixth in the nation, earning him an All-Colonial Athletic Association first-team selection.

== Professional career ==
=== Pre-draft ===
Hightower was not invited to the 2008 NFL Scouting Combine, but performed well at Richmond's "pro day". He was considered one of the "small-school sleepers" in the 2008 NFL draft, but lacked the speed of elite running back prospects. Regarded as "more of a ‘three yards and a cloud of dust’ runner", Hightower was projected as a solid middle-round pick.

Pre-draft measurables
Height	Weight	40-yard dash	20-yard shuttle	Three-cone drill	Vertical jump	Broad jump	Bench press
6 ft 0 1/4 in (1.84 m)	217 lb (98 kg)	4.62 s	4.46 s	7.29 s	31.5 in (0.80 m)	9 ft 7 in (2.92 m)	20 reps
All values from Richmond Pro Day

=== Arizona Cardinals ===
==== 2008 ====
Hightower was selected in the fifth round (149th overall) of the 2008 NFL draft by the Arizona Cardinals.

On June 5, 2008, the Arizona Cardinals signed him to a 3-year, $1.28 million contract.

Going into his rookie season, Hightower was behind veteran running back Edgerrin James on the Cardinals' depth chart. In the Cardinals' season opener at the San Francisco 49ers, he had 8 carries for 13 rushing yards and a touchdown in his NFL debut. He then became the only Cardinal rookie running back ever to have scored a touchdown in each of his first two games with the franchise. During a Week 5 contest against the Buffalo Bills, Hightower rushed for 37-yards on 7 carries and had 2 rushing touchdowns. On November 2, 2008, Hightower was given his first career start against the St. Louis Rams. He finished the game with a season-high 22 rushing attempts for 109-yards and scored a 30-yard rushing touchdown in the Cardinals' 34–13 victory. Hightower had 21 rushing yards on 11 carries and his second two rushing touchdown game in a 29–37 loss to the New York Giants on December 23. Against the St. Louis Rams again in Week 14, he had 12 carries for 32 rushing yards and a touchdown as the Cardinals defeated them again 34–10.

Although he finished the regular season as the starting running back for the last 7 games of the season and helped the Cardinals obtain a 9–7 record, he was not given the starting role going into the playoffs. When the Cardinals played the Atlanta Falcons in the NFC Wild-card, Hightower racked up 6 rushing attempts for 23-yards and a touchdown as they defeated the Falcons 30–24. The next week in the divisional round game against the Carolina Panthers, Hightower had 17 carries for 76-rushing yards and scored on a 3-yard touchdown reception, helping his team win 33–13. On January 18, 2009, the Cardinals played the Philadelphia Eagles in the NFC Championship. Hightower ended up carrying the ball 11 times for 33 rushing yards and caught a game-winning 8-yard touchdown reception to seal the victory 32–25. Hightower would go on to play a minor role as the Arizona Cardinals played the Pittsburgh Steelers in Super Bowl XLIII. He only carried the ball once and accounted for a total of 13 receiving yards as they lost 23–27 on the Steelers' final drive.

As a rookie, he set a Cardinals record for total touchdowns by a rookie with 10 in the regular season and 13 including the playoffs. He finished his first season with 143 carries, 399 rushing yards, and 10 rushing touchdowns.

==== 2009 ====
Although Edgerrin James left via free agency during the offseason, the Cardinals drafted Beanie Wells and LaRod Stephens-Howling in the 2009 NFL draft. Even with two new rookies, Hightower was given the starting running back position to begin the season. In the season opener against the San Francisco 49ers, he carried the ball 8 times for 15 rushing yards and caught 12 passes for 121 receiving yards. Although he had his first career 100-yard receiving game, the Cardinals lost their home opener 16–20. The next game against the Jacksonville Jaguars, Hightower had 15 carries for 72-yards and scored his first touchdown of the season, helping his team win 31–17. On October 18, 2009, he ran for 32-yards on 13 carries and scored a rushing touchdown, while also accounting for 26-yards on 4 receptions in a 27–3 victory over the Seattle Seahawks. In a Week 11 contest against the St. Louis Rams, Hightower carried the ball 14 times for 110 rushing yards as Arizona won 21–13. This was also his first career game with over 100 rushing yards. Although he remained the starter throughout the season, rookie Beanie Wells began to receive more carries as the season progressed. After finishing the season 10-6 the Cardinals were in the playoffs under head coach Ken Whisenhunt for the second consecutive season. In the NFC Wild Card game against the Green Bay Packers, Hightower had only 7 carries for 19 yards but scored a touchdown as they won 51–45. The following week, he ran for 87 rushing yards on only 6 rushing attempts and scored a 70-yard rushing touchdown in a 14–45 loss to the New Orleans Saints. He finished the regular season with 143 carries, 598 rushing yards, 8 rushing touchdowns, 63 receptions, 428 receiving yards, and had 5 fumbles.

==== 2010 ====
Hightower began the 2010 season returning as the Cardinals' starting running back ahead of Beanie Wells and Ryan Torain. In their 2010 regular season opener, he had 13 carries for 54 rushing yards and a touchdown, while also accounting for 4 catches for 40 receiving yards against the St. Louis Rams. The next week, as the Cardinals played at Atlanta, Hightower had 11 rushing attempts for 115 rushing yards and scored an 80-yard rushing touchdown in a 7–41 loss to the Falcons. On December 12, 2010, he ran for a career-high 148-yards against the Denver Broncos and scored 2 rushing touchdowns in the Cardinals' 43–13 victory. Hightower finished his last season with the Cardinals with a career-high 153 carries, a career-high 736 rushing yards, and scored 5 rushing touchdowns.

=== Washington Redskins ===
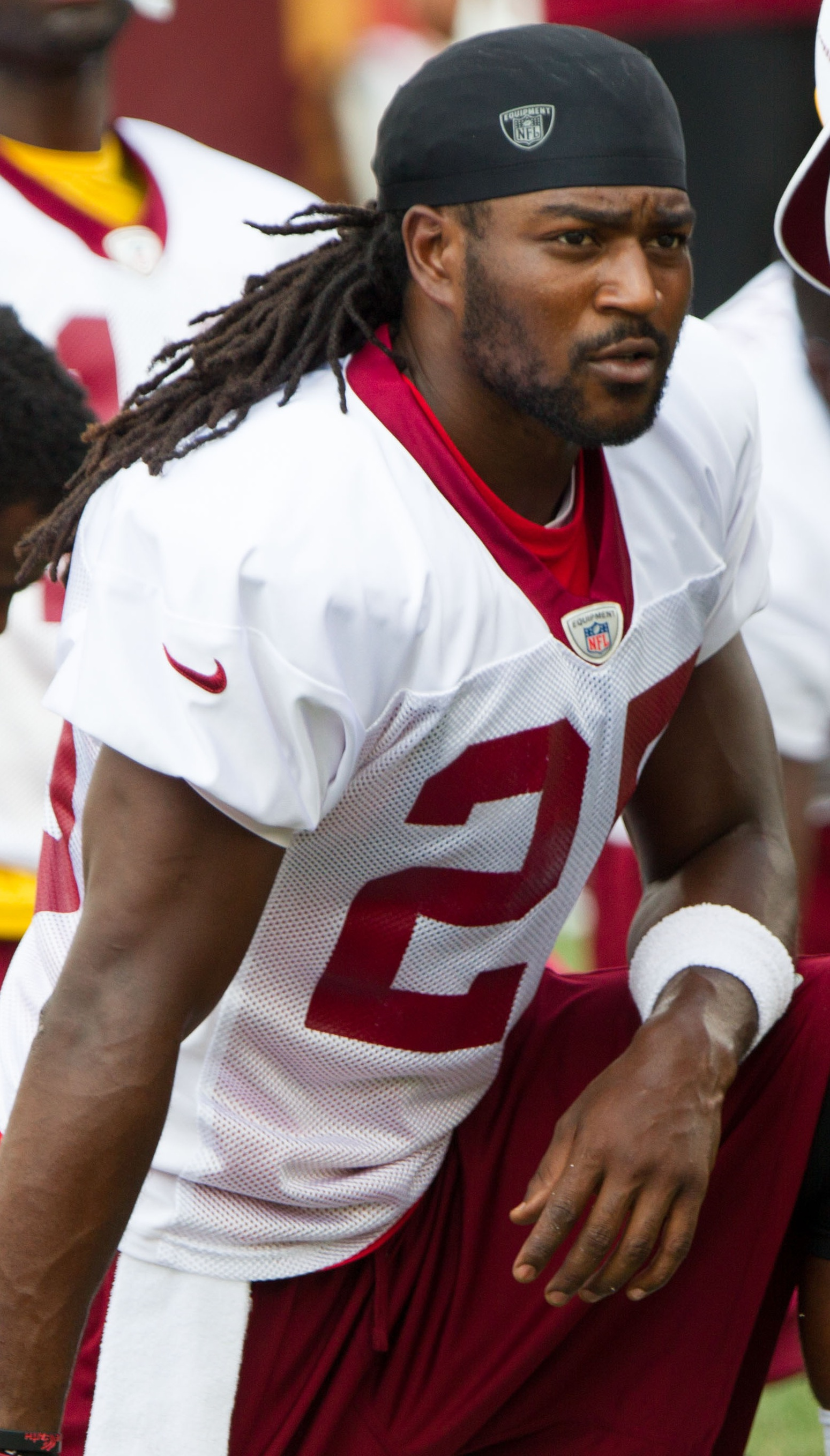
Hightower with the Washington Redskins in 2011

==== 2011 ====
Hightower was traded on July 31, 2011, to the Washington Redskins in exchange for defensive end Vonnie Holliday and a sixth round draft pick in 2012. On August 4, 2011, the Redskins signed him to a one-year, $1.20 million contract.

Hightower was named the Redskins starting running back in the season opener and had a career-high 25 carries for 72 rushing yards and scored a touchdown in a 28–14 victory over the New York Giants. The following week, he had 96 rushing yards on 20 carries, helping defeat his former team, the Arizona Cardinals, 22–21. After starting in the first five of the Redskins' games, he rushed for 321 yards on 84 carries with two total touchdowns. He played in his last regular season game with the Redskins on October 23, 2011, finishing the game with 17 carries and 88 rushing yards. Hightower was then placed on injured reserve due to a torn ACL, effectively ending his season.

==== 2012 ====
On May 13, 2012, Hightower re-signed with Redskins on a one-year contract. The previous season, Roy Helu played well after replacing him after his injury. He was expected to compete for the starting spot in the 2012 season against Helu and Evan Royster, however, he was cut on August 31 for final roster cuts before the start of the season in favor of emerging rookie Alfred Morris.

In late 2013, doctors found that he had been dealing with an infection that hindered his injury recovery. Hightower played a game for the Blacktips of the Fall Experimental Football League in November 2014.

=== New Orleans Saints ===
==== 2015 ====
After four years away from the NFL, Hightower signed a futures contract with the New Orleans Saints on January 4, 2015. He was released on September 12. He was soon re-signed two days later, but was released again on September 16. He was re-signed a second time to the Saints' active roster on November 2 after Khiry Robinson was placed on the team's injured reserve. On November 3, 2015, the Saints signed him to a one-year, $745,000 contract at the veteran minimum.

In Week 10, Hightower made his regular season debut with the Saints against his former team, the Washington Redskins. He finished the game with 11 carries for 46 rushing yards, as the Saints lost 47–14. On December 13, 2015, Hightower received his first NFL start in over four years after Mark Ingram II was placed on injured/reserved. He finished the game with a career-high 28 carries for 85 rushing yards and a touchdown in a win over the Tampa Bay Buccaneers. The next game, Hightower had 13 rushing attempts for 54 rushing yards and caught three passes for 31 receiving yards in a 35–27 loss to the Detroit Lions. He received his third start for New Orleans on December 27, 2015, and carried the ball 27 times for 122 rushing yards, while also scoring two rushing touchdowns in the 38-27 Saints victory over the Jacksonville Jaguars.

He finished the season with 96 carries for 375 rushing yards and four rushing touchdowns in eight games and three starts.

==== 2016 ====
On April 6, 2016, the Saints signed Hightower to a one-year, $840,000 contract with a signing bonus of $80,000. He entered the 2016 season as the primary backup to Mark Ingram II after the Saints had released C. J. Spiller during the offseason.

On October 30, 2016, Hightower replaced Mark Ingram II after he was benched due to fumbling issues and had 26 carries for 102 rushing yards in a 25–20 victory over the Seattle Seahawks after being only limited to a maximum of five carries in each of the first seven games. The following week, Hightower earned his first start of the season in place of Ingram and had 23 rushing attempts for 87 yards and scored his first touchdown of a season during the Saints' 41–23 defeat of the San Francisco 49ers.

On December 18, 2016, Hightower recorded 11 carries for 37 rushing yards and a season-high two touchdowns in a 48–41 victory over the Arizona Cardinals, his former team.

=== San Francisco 49ers ===
On April 1, 2017, Hightower signed with the San Francisco 49ers. He was released by San Francisco on September 1.

== NFL career statistics ==
Year	Team	Games		Rushing					Receiving					Fumbles	
Year	Team	GP	GS	Att	Yds	Avg	Lng	TD	Rec	Yds	Avg	Lng	TD	Fum	Lost
2008	ARI	16	7	143	399	2.8	30T	10	34	237	7.0	26	0	2	0
2009	ARI	16	16	143	598	4.2	50	8	63	428	6.8	23	0	5	4
2010	ARI	16	13	153	736	4.8	80T	5	21	136	6.5	20	0	5	4
2011	WAS	5	5	84	321	3.8	22	1	10	78	7.8	19	1	0	0
2015	NO	8	3	96	375	3.9	26	4	12	129	10.8	27	0	0	0
2016	NO	16	1	133	548	4.1	30	4	22	200	9.1	50T	1	0	0
Career		77	45	752	2,977	4.0	80	32	162	1,208	7.5	50	2	12	8

== Personal life ==
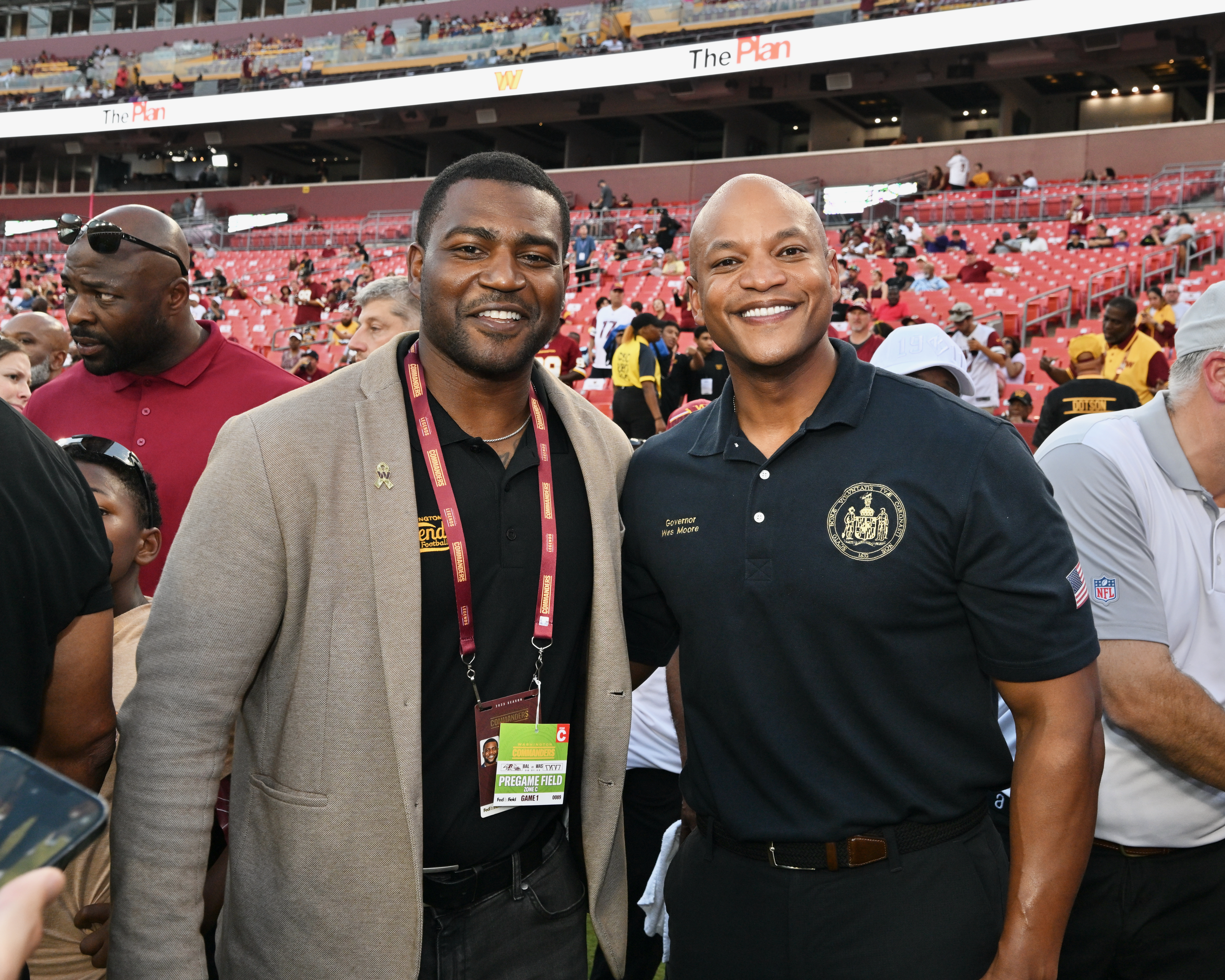
Hightower with Maryland governor Wes Moore, 2023

Hightower was named director of alumni relations for the Washington Commanders in December 2020.
