= Curtis Modkins =

American football player and coach (born 1970)

Minnesota Vikings
- Title: Running backs coach/run game coordinator

Personal information
- Born: November 15, 1970 (age 56); Marlin, Texas, U.S.

Career information
- Position: Running back
- High school: Marlin (TX)
- College: TCU (1989-1992)

Career history
- TCU (1995) Graduate assistant; TCU (1996) Secondary coach; TCU (1997) Tight ends coach; New Mexico (1998–2001) Cornerbacks coach; Georgia Tech (2002) Defensive backs coach; Georgia Tech (2003–2007) Running backs coach; Kansas City Chiefs (2008) Running backs coach; Arizona Cardinals (2009) Running backs coach; Buffalo Bills (2010–2012) Offensive coordinator; Detroit Lions (2013–2015) Running backs coach; San Francisco 49ers (2016) Offensive coordinator; Chicago Bears (2017) Running backs coach; Denver Broncos (2018–2021) Running backs coach; Minnesota Vikings (2022–present) Running backs coach/run game coordinator
- Coaching profile at Pro Football Reference

Curtis Modkins (born November 15, 1970) is an American football coach who is the current running backs coach and run game coordinator for the Minnesota Vikings of the National Football League (NFL). A 25-year coaching veteran, Modkins has spent the last 12 years in the NFL as an offensive coordinator or running backs coach. He has worked with four different 1,000-yard rushers during that span: C. J. Spiller with Buffalo in 2012, Reggie Bush with Detroit in 2013, Jordan Howard with Chicago in 2017 and Phillip Lindsay with Denver in 2018–19.

== Playing career ==
Modkins attended Texas Christian University (TCU), where he was a three-year starting running back for the TCU Horned Frogs football team. He rushed for 2,763 yards and caught 54 passes during his college career, and was a two-time all-Southwest Conference selection.

== Coaching career ==
=== College years ===
Modkins began his coaching career as a graduate assistant at his alma mater, TCU in 1995. He was promoted to the position of secondary coach in 1996 and then coached the Horned Frogs' tight ends in 1997. Modkins spent the next four seasons coaching cornerbacks at the University of New Mexico before arriving at Georgia Tech. Modkins spent time learning under head coach Chan Gailey (while they were at Dallas). After Gailey went to Georgia Tech to become its next head coach, Modkins followed, becoming the coach of both running backs and defensive backs.

=== NFL ===
When Gailey was fired from Georgia Tech in 2007, Modkins went with him to the Kansas City Chiefs, to coach running backs. Gailey became the Chiefs' offensive coordinator. Modkins left his spot with the Chiefs to coach the same position for the Arizona Cardinals in 2009.

In 2010, Modkins became the offensive coordinator for the Buffalo Bills. As offensive coordinator for Buffalo from 2010 to 2012, Modkins directed a unit in which quarterback Ryan Fitzpatrick topped 3,000 passing yards each season and wide receiver Stevie Johnson reached the 1,000-yard mark in each season. Modkins was dismissed, along with the entire Bills coaching staff, on December 31, 2012. On January 14, 2013, Modkins was hired as the running backs coach of the Detroit Lions.

On January 22, 2016, Modkins was hired by the San Francisco 49ers as their new offensive coordinator. Modkins helped the team finish fourth in the NFL in rushing offense (126.2) and ranked second in the NFL in red zone efficiency (68.2%). Modkins joined the Chicago Bears as their running backs coach in 2017. Modkins helped Jordan Howard rank sixth in the NFL with 1,122 rushing yards while totaling five 100-yard rushing games.

Modkins reached an agreement with the Denver Broncos on January 4, 2018, to be their new RB coach.

Modkins took a leave of absence from the team on October 17, 2020, after testing positive for COVID-19, and returned to the team by October 28.

Modkins was relived of his duties after the firing of head coach Vic Fangio.

Modkins was hired by Kevin O'Connell (American football) to be the new running backs coach for the Minnesota Vikings
