= Pago Togafau =

American football player (born 1984)

No. 52, 51, 95
- Position: Linebacker

Personal information
- Born: January 10, 1984 (age 42); Long Beach, California, U.S.
- Listed height: 5 ft 11 in (1.80 m)
- Listed weight: 240 lb (109 kg)

Career information
- High school: Long Beach Polytechnic
- College: Idaho State
- NFL draft: 2007: undrafted

Career history
- Arizona Cardinals (2007)*; Philadelphia Eagles (2007); New Orleans Saints (2008)*; Arizona Cardinals (2008–2009); Tennessee Titans (2010)*; Arizona Cardinals (2010–2011)*; Spokane Shock (2012)
- * Offseason or practice squad member only

Awards and highlights
- 2× First-team All-Big Sky (2005–2006)

Career NFL statistics
- Total tackles: 23
- Stats at Pro Football Reference

Pago Faao'o Togafau (born January 10, 1984) is an American former professional football player who was a linebacker in the National Football League (NFL). He was signed by the Arizona Cardinals as an undrafted free agent in 2007. He played college football for the Idaho State Bengals.

Togafau was also a member of the Philadelphia Eagles, New Orleans Saints, and Tennessee Titans.

== Early life ==
Togafau attended Long Beach Polytechnic High School in Long Beach, California and was a student and a letterman in football. In football, he was a first-team All-Moore League selection, a first-team All-Press Telegram selection as named by the Long Beach Press-Telegram, a first-team All-CIF selection, and a first-team All-Dream Team selection.
