= Matt Raich =

American football coach in the NFL

Indianapolis Colts
- Title: Assistant defensive line coach

Personal information
- Born: Monaca, Pennsylvania, U.S.

Career information
- Position: Linebacker
- College: Westminster College

Career history

Coaching
- Westminster College (PA) (1993–1994) Assistant coach; Robert Morris (1996–1998) Assistant coach; Glenville State College (1999) Assistant coach; Hildesheim Invaders (1999) Defensive coordinator; Robert Morris (2000–2002) Assistant coach / recruiting coordinator; Pittsburgh Steelers (2004–2006) Offensive assistant; Arizona Cardinals (2007–2008) Defensive assistant; Arizona Cardinals (2009–2012) Linebackers coach; Duquesne (2013) Linebackers coach; Detroit Lions (2014) Defensive quality control; Detroit Lions (2015–2017) Defensive assistant/defensive ends; Cincinnati Bengals (2018) Defensive assistant/assistant defensive line; St. Louis BattleHawks (2020) Co-defensive coordinator/linebackers coach; Indianapolis Colts (2020–2021) Special defensive assistant/assistant defensive line; Indianapolis Colts (2022–2024) Assistant defensive line; Senior Assistant for the Defense Line for the Indianapolis Colts (2025–present)

Operations
- Pittsburgh Steelers (2002–2003) Player personnel intern

Matt Raich is an American football coach currently with the Indianapolis Colts, serving as senior assistant defensive line coach. A 26-year coaching veteran, he has 18 seasons of NFL experience. Raich is a native of Monaca, Pa.

== Coaching career ==
College coaching (1993–94; 1996–2002; 2013)

Collegiately, Raich coached at Duquesne (2013), Robert Morris (1996–98, 2000–02), Glenville State (1999) and his alma mater, Westminster (Pa.) College (1993–94).

German Federal League (1999)

He coached in the German Federal League in 1999 and served as the defensive coordinator for the Hildesheim Invaders.

NFL coaching (2002–2012; 2014–18)

Prior to Indianapolis, he coached in the NFL with the Cincinnati Bengals (2018), Detroit Lions (2014–17), Arizona Cardinals (2007–2012) and Pittsburgh Steelers (2002–06). He won Super Bowl XL with the Steelers at the conclusion of the 2005 season.

Raich started his NFL career as a player personnel intern for Pittsburgh from 2002 to 2003.

St. Louis BattleHawks (2020)

In 2020, Raich served as the co-defensive coordinator/line-backers coach for the St. Louis BattleHawks of the XFL

Indianapolis Colts (2020–current)

In 2021, the Colts finished in the top-five in takeaways (33, second), fumble recoveries (14, tied-first) and interceptions (19, tied-third). Defensive tackle DeForest Buckner earned his second career Pro Bowl selection.

In 2020, the Colts defense ranked in the top-10 in various categories, including total defense (332.1 yards per game, eighth), rush defense (90.5 yards per game, second), takeaways (25, tied-fifth) and points per game allowed (22.6, tied-10th). For the first time since 1971, the Colts ranked in the top-five in run defense. For the first time since 2007, Indianapolis finished in the top-10 in total defense.

Buckner also earned Associated Press First Team All-Pro honors in 2020 as he registered a single-season franchise record for most sacks (9.5) by a defensive tackle. Buckner joined Art Donovan (1954–57) and Gene Lipscomb (1958–59) as the only Colts defensive tackles to earn that honor.

Coaching Career	Team	Position
1993–1994	Westminster (Pa.) College	Assistant Coach
1996–1998	Robert Morris	Assistant Coach
1999	Glenville State	Assistant Coach
1999	Hildesheim Invaders (German Federal League)	Defensive Coordinator
2000–2002	Robert Morris	Assistant Coach/Recruiting Coordinator
2002–2003	Pittsburgh Steelers	Player Personnel Intern
2004–2006	Pittsburgh Steelers	Offensive Assistant
2007–2008	Arizona Cardinals	Defensive Assistant
2009–2012	Arizona Cardinals	Linebackers
2013	Duquesne	Linebackers
2014	Detroit Lions	Defensive Quality Control
2015–2017	Detroit Lions	Defensive Assistant/Defensive Ends
2018	Cincinnati Bengals	Defensive Assistant/Assistant Defensive Line
2020	St. Louis BattleHawks (XFL)	Co-Defensive Coordinator/Linebackers
2020–2021	Indianapolis Colts	Special Defensive Assistant/Assistant Defensive Line
2022–2024	Indianapolis Colts	Assistant Defensive Line
2025	Indianapolis Colts	Senior Assistant Defensive Line

== Playing career ==
Raich played linebacker at Westminster (Pa.) College from 1989 to 1994 and finished as the school's leading tackler. He earned three NAIA All-America Awards and was part of Westminster teams that won 42 of 48 games, including the NAIA National Championship in 1989.
