= Onrea Jones =

American football player (born 1983)

No. 89
- Position: Wide receiver

Personal information
- Born: December 22, 1983 (age 42); Clarksville, Tennessee, U.S.
- Listed height: 6 ft 0 in (1.83 m)
- Listed weight: 202 lb (92 kg)

Career information
- College: Hampton
- NFL draft: 2007: undrafted

Career history
- Houston Texans (2007)*; San Diego Chargers (2007)*; Green Bay Packers (2007)*; Indianapolis Colts (2007–2008)*; Arizona Cardinals (2008–2009)*; Washington Redskins (2009)*; Arizona Cardinals (2009–2010); Chicago Bears (2011)*; Hamilton Tiger-Cats (2012–2013); Ottawa Redblacks (2014)*
- * Offseason or practice squad member only
- Stats at Pro Football Reference
- Stats at CFL.ca (archive)

Onrea Jones (born December 22, 1983) is an American former professional football player who was a wide receiver in the National Football League (NFL). He played college football for the Hampton Pirates and was signed by the Houston Texans as an undrafted free agent in 2007.

Jones was a member of the San Diego Chargers, Green Bay Packers, Indianapolis Colts, Washington Redskins, Arizona Cardinals, Chicago Bears, Hamilton Tiger-Cats and Ottawa Redblacks.
