= Will Davis (linebacker) =

American football player (born 1986)

No. 59
- Position: Linebacker

Personal information
- Born: June 2, 1986 (age 40); Greenbelt, Maryland, U.S.
- Listed height: 6 ft 2 in (1.88 m)
- Listed weight: 262 lb (119 kg)

Career information
- High school: Eleanor Roosevelt (Greenbelt)
- College: Illinois
- NFL draft: 2009: 6th round, 204th overall pick

Career history
- Arizona Cardinals (2009–2010); Saskatchewan Roughriders (2013)

Career NFL statistics
- Tackles: 33
- Sacks: 3
- Stats at Pro Football Reference

William Benjamin Davis, Jr. (born June 2, 1986) is an American former professional football player who was a defensive end in the National Football League (NFL) and Canadian Football League (CFL). He was selected by the Arizona Cardinals in the sixth round of the 2009 NFL draft. He played college football for the Illinois Fighting Illini.

== Early life ==
He played high school football at Eleanor Roosevelt High School in Greenbelt, Maryland.

== Professional career ==
=== Arizona Cardinals ===
Davis was selected in the sixth round of the 2009 NFL draft with the 204th overall pick. He was released on September 2, 2011.

=== Saskatchewan Roughriders ===
He was signed on March 15, 2013.
