= Ben Patrick =

American football player (born 1984)

No. 89
- Position: Tight end

Personal information
- Born: August 23, 1984 (age 42); Savannah, Georgia, U.S.
- Listed height: 6 ft 3 in (1.91 m)
- Listed weight: 254 lb (115 kg)

Career information
- High school: Jenkins (Savannah)
- College: Duke; Delaware
- NFL draft: 2007: 7th round, 215th overall pick

Career history
- Arizona Cardinals (2007–2010); New York Giants (2011); Virginia Destroyers (2012)

Awards and highlights
- First-team All-American (2006); First-team All-A-10 (2006)

Career NFL statistics
- Receptions: 45
- Receiving yards: 446
- Receiving touchdowns: 4
- Stats at Pro Football Reference

Ben Patrick (born August 23, 1984) is an American former professional football player who was a tight end in the National Football League (NFL). He was selected by the Arizona Cardinals in the seventh round of the 2007 NFL draft. He played college football for the Duke Blue Devils and Delaware Fightin' Blue Hens.

== Early life ==
Patrick attended Herschel V. Jenkins High School in Savannah, Georgia, and was a letterman in football, basketball, and baseball.

== College career ==
Patrick began his college career at Duke University, where he red shirted his first year and then went on to play three seasons. After earning a degree in African American studies, he transferred to the University of Delaware for his final season of college eligibility in 2006. With the Fightin' Blue Hens, Patrick went on to lead Division I-AA tight ends in receiving with 64 catches for 639 yards and six touchdowns. He was an all Atlantic 10 Conference first-team pick and was named a first-team All-America, He also became the first Blue Hens player invited to the Hula Bowl. Patrick was a semi-finalist for the John Mackey Award given to the top tight end position player in the nation. At the end of the season, he was rated the best tight end prospect in the NCAA Division I-AA ranks by The NFL Draft Report in his senior season.

== Professional career ==
=== Arizona Cardinals ===
Patrick was selected by the Cardinals with the 25th pick in the seventh round of the 2007 NFL draft. On September 4, 2007, Patrick was signed to the Arizona Cardinals practice squad after being cut from the roster less than a week earlier. He was promoted to the active roster on October 29. Patrick finished the 2007 season playing in 8 games with 3 games started with 7 receptions for 73 yards, including a long of 21 yards, for two touchdowns. During the 2008 regular season Patrick caught 11 passes for 104 yards, but no touchdowns. In Super Bowl XLIII, against the Pittsburgh Steelers, Patrick caught a 1-yard touchdown pass from quarterback Kurt Warner in the second quarter. It made him the first 7th round pick to score a touchdown in the Super Bowl since 2005.

=== New York Giants ===
On August 1, 2011, Patrick signed a one-year contract with the New York Giants. He announced his retirement on August 6. On September 16, Patrick un-retired and was reinstated by the NFL. He became a free agent, since the Giants released him.

=== Virginia Destroyers ===
Patrick played for the Virginia Destroyers in 2012.

== Coaching career ==
He is currently a coach at Gilbert high school in Arizona.
