= LaRod Stephens-Howling =

American football player (born 1987)

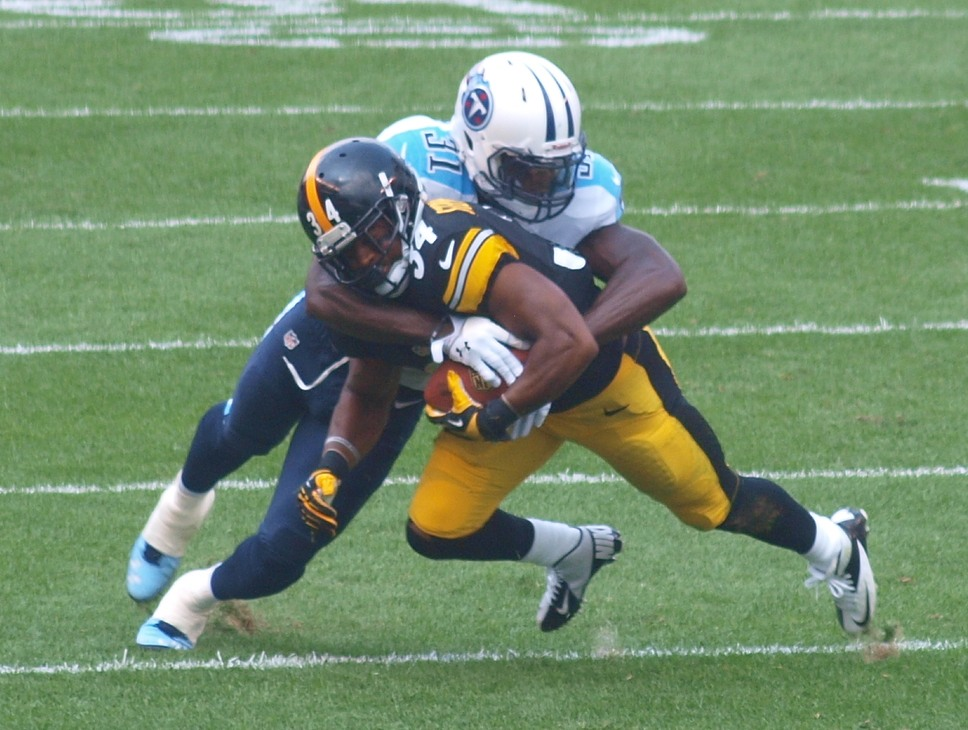
- Stephens-Howling with the Steelers in 2013

No. 36, 34
- Position: Running back

Personal information
- Born: April 26, 1987 (age 39); Johnstown, Pennsylvania, U.S.
- Listed height: 5 ft 7 in (1.70 m)
- Listed weight: 185 lb (84 kg)

Career information
- High school: Greater Johnstown
- College: Pittsburgh (2005–2008)
- NFL draft: 2009: 7th round, 240th overall pick

Career history

Playing
- Arizona Cardinals (2009–2012); Pittsburgh Steelers (2013)

Coaching
- Pittsburgh (2016) Graduate assistant; Robert Morris (2017–2018) Running backs coach

Awards and highlights
- NFL kickoff return yards leader (2010); PFWA All-Rookie Team (2009)

Career NFL statistics
- Rushing yards: 670
- Rushing touchdowns: 5
- Receiving yards: 545
- Receiving touchdowns: 3
- Return yards: 4,092
- Return touchdowns: 3
- Stats at Pro Football Reference

LaRod Stephens-Howling (born April 26, 1987) is an American former professional football player who was a running back and kick returner in the National Football League (NFL). He was selected by the Arizona Cardinals in the seventh round of the 2009 NFL draft. He played college football for the Pittsburgh Panthers. He was also a member of the Pittsburgh Steelers.

== Early life ==
Stephens-Howling is a native of Johnstown, Pennsylvania. He attended Greater Johnstown High School, where he competed in football, baseball, wrestling, and track.

== College career ==
Stephens-Howling played college football for the Pittsburgh Panthers. He was the starter for the Panthers before being replaced by future NFL Pro Bowl running back LeSean McCoy in 2007.

== Professional career ==
Pre-draft measurables
Height	Weight
5 ft 6 1/2 in (1.69 m)	180 lb (82 kg)
Values from Pro Day

=== Arizona Cardinals ===
Stephens-Howling was selected by the Arizona Cardinals in the seventh round of the 2009 NFL draft with the 240th overall pick. In addition to playing running back, Stephens-Howling returned kickoffs for the team. On November 1, 2009, Stephens-Howling recorded his first NFL touchdown on a 14-yard reception from quarterback Kurt Warner against the Carolina Panthers. On November 29, 2009, Stephens-Howling returned a kickoff 99 yards for a touchdown against the Tennessee Titans. On September 26, 2010, Stephens-Howling returned the opening kickoff 102 yards for a touchdown against the Oakland Raiders. On October 31, 2010, he scored his first rushing touchdown after bouncing out near the sidelines and running 30 yards against the Tampa Bay Buccaneers. On December 4, 2011, Stephens-Howling scored the game-winning touchdown in overtime against the Dallas Cowboys on a 52-yard reception from Kevin Kolb. He became a restricted free agent following the 2011 season, but was re-signed by the Cardinals on April 16, 2012.

=== Pittsburgh Steelers ===
Stephens-Howling signed with the Pittsburgh Steelers on April 26, 2013. At the beginning of the 2013 season against the Tennessee Titans, he tore his ACL and missed the rest of the season after undergoing surgery.

== Personal life ==
in 2017, Stephens-Howling joined Robert Morris' coaching staff as the running backs coach.
