= Miami Country Day School =

Coordinates: 25°52′27.34″N 80°11′2.17″W

- Unincorporated Miami-Dade County, Florida, United States

Information
- Type: Private, independent
- Religious affiliation: Non-denominational
- Opened: 1938
- Head of School: Mariandl Hufford
- Grades: Pk3 to 12
- Campus type: Suburban
- Color: Red White Navy
- Mascot: Spartan
- Website: www.miamicountryday.org

Miami Country Day School (MCDS) is a private, non-denominational, co-ed preschool-12 college preparatory school in unincorporated Miami-Dade County, near Miami Shores, just north of the city of Miami, Florida, United States. The school has been named a Blue Ribbon School of Excellence. Mariandl Hufford is the institution's Head of School.

== History ==
Miami Country Day School began in 1938 as an elementary boarding school for boys, founded by Luther B. Sommers and C.W. Abele. In the early years, the school was known as The Miami Country Day and Resident School for Boys. Through the 1950s and 1960s, day students were enrolled.

In the 1970s, Miami Country Day became co-educational and the boarding program was phased out. Boarding rooms were converted into classrooms to make space. Originally a K-8 program, the school expanded to include an Upper School and graduated its first twelfth-grade class in 1981.

The "Spartans" began to participate in a wide variety of competitive sports such as golf, soccer and volleyball.

== Academics ==
The school's enrollment is approximately 1,280 students. Class size in the Lower School ranges from 8–24 depending on grade level. Annual tuition varies by grade and ranges from $40,000 to $52,000.

The school has a large international student community. With 47% of its students born abroad (and more than 75% of parents born abroad), MCDS is one of the most international schools in Miami and features an extensive language department.

MCDS's team for the Junior Engineering Technical Society TEAMS competition ranked nationally for two consecutive years. In 2007, MCDS was the first-place winner of the competition, and in 2008 the JETS team placed 20th in their division.

== Athletics ==
The following sports are offered to boys at Miami Country Day School:

Fall	Winter	Spring
Football (6/7/8, V)	Soccer (6/7/8, V)	Baseball (6/7/8, V)
Cross country (V)	Basketball (6/7/8, JV; 6/7/8, V, JV, V)	Lacrosse (6/7/8, JV; 6/7/8, V, JV, V)
Golf (V)		Water polo (6/7/8, V)
Swimming (V)		Football (V)
Volleyball (6/7/8, V)		Tennis (6/7/8, V)

The following sports are offered to girls at Miami Country Day School:

Fall	Winter	Spring
Basketball (6/7/8, JV, V)	Tennis (6/7/8, V)	
Volleyball (6/7/8, V, JV, V)	Soccer (6/7/8, V)	Water polo (6/7/8, V)
Swimming (6/7/8, V)		Softball (V)
Golf (V)		Lacrosse (V)
Cross country (V)		

=== Athletic history ===
- 2006 varsity football team had one of the top 10 ranked offense in the state of Florida, regional playoffs appearance.
- 2014-2019 six consecutive Florida State champions in girls' high school basketball
- 2013, 2014 girls' basketball coach Ochiel Swaby and player Danielle Minott named coach and player of the year by Miami Herald
- 2014 girls' basketball team ranked #11 in the nation by USA Today, December 2014
- 2015 girls' basketball team won Dick's National Championship in New York
- 2008 boys 'water polo regional champions
- 2008 water polo team reached state semi-finals
- 2008 girls' basketball team regional finalists
- 2008 boys' varsity soccer team had been district champion for three of the previous four years
- 2007 boys' lacrosse district champions
- 2009 girls' water polo district champions
- 1992, 2011 boys' varsity basketball made it to the regional finals.
- 1992, 2013, 2014, 2015, and 2016 girls' varsity soccer district champions; 2015 regional champions
- 2006, 2014 girls' softball district champions
- 2013–2014 girls'/boys' tennis district champions
- 2014, 2006, 2007 girls' volleyball district champions
- 2014 boys/girls' cross country teams ranked #9 in state of Florida

== Facilities ==
The school is located on 21 acres (85,000 m^{2}), including an aquatic center, athletic fields and gymnasium with synthetic turf. The media and resources center includes a broadcast studio, parking garage, and the Center for the Arts, housing the John Davies Theater.

== Extracurricular activities ==
Beyond academics, the school places great emphasis on arts, athletics, and extracurricular activities. Students are encouraged to participate in visual and performing arts, drama, dance, and a variety of sports that build both teamwork and individual skills. Tuition for the highest grade level is around $52,900, but nearly one in five students receive financial aid, with the average assistance being close to $30,000. With strong ratings in academics, college preparation, and student life, Miami Country Day School continues to uphold its reputation as a well-rounded institution preparing young learners for success in higher education and beyond.

== Accreditation and membership ==
Miami Country Day School is accredited or a member of the following organizations:

- Southern Association of Colleges and Schools
- Southern Association of Independent Schools
- Florida Council of Independent Schools
- Florida Kindergarten Council
- National Association of Independent Schools
- National Association of College Admission Counseling
- Southern Association of College Admission Counseling
- National Association of Secondary School Principals
- American Library Association
- Secondary School Admissions Test Board
- Educational Records Bureau
- College Board
- Council for Advancement and Support of Education

== Notable alumni ==
- Shon Abaev (born 2006), Israeli basketball player
- Roy Altman (born 1982), United States district judge for the Southern District of Florida
- Briny Baird, professional golfer
- Manny Diaz, head coach at Duke University and former head coach at the University of Miami
- Emily Estefan, musician
- Christian Gaddis, NFL player
- DJ Infamous, music producer and disc jockey
- Laurel Ivory, NWSL player
- Zoe Kravitz (born 1988), actress/singer and filmmaker
- Natasha Lyonne (born 1979), actress, executive producer, director, and writer.
- Lele Pons, comedian and singer
- Navi Rawat, actress
- Sandon Stolle, professional tennis player
