= Anquan Boldin =

American football player (born 1980)

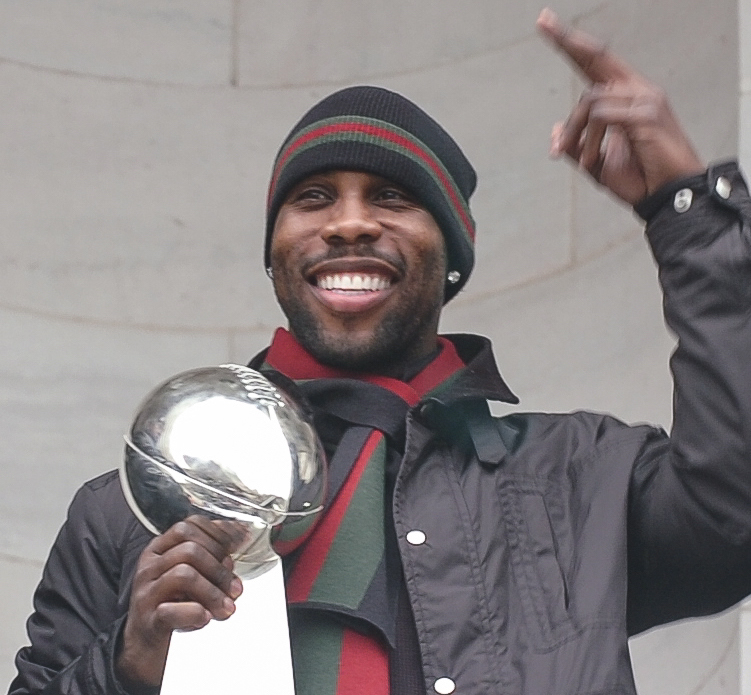
- Boldin in 2013 during the Ravens Super Bowl XLVII victory celebration in Baltimore

No. 81, 80
- Position: Wide receiver

Personal information
- Born: October 3, 1980 (age 46); Pahokee, Florida, U.S.
- Listed height: 6 ft 1 in (1.85 m)
- Listed weight: 220 lb (100 kg)

Career information
- High school: Pahokee
- College: Florida State (1999–2002)
- NFL draft: 2003: 2nd round, 54th overall pick

Career history
- Arizona Cardinals (2003–2009); Baltimore Ravens (2010–2012); San Francisco 49ers (2013–2015); Detroit Lions (2016); Buffalo Bills (2017)*
- * Offseason or practice squad member only

Awards and highlights
- Super Bowl champion (XLVII); NFL Offensive Rookie of the Year (2003); Walter Payton NFL Man of the Year (2015); 3× Pro Bowl (2003, 2006, 2008); PFWA All-Rookie Team (2003); NFLPA Alan Page Community Award (2014); BCS national champion (1999); Brian Piccolo Award (2002); Second-team All-ACC (2002); NFL record: Most receiving yards in a first career game by a rookie (217)

Career NFL statistics
- Receptions: 1,076
- Receiving yards: 13,779
- Receiving touchdowns: 82
- Stats at Pro Football Reference

Anquan Kenmile Boldin (/ˈænkwɑːn/; born October 3, 1980) is an American former professional football player who was a wide receiver for 14 seasons in the National Football League (NFL). He played college football for the Florida State Seminoles and was selected by the Arizona Cardinals in the second round of the 2003 NFL draft. He also played for the Baltimore Ravens, San Francisco 49ers and Detroit Lions.

Boldin was the 2003 NFL Offensive Rookie of the Year, was selected to three Pro Bowls and won Super Bowl XLVII with the Ravens. In 2015, he was named the Walter Payton Man of the Year for his community service. Despite not being named to the NFL 2000s All-Decade Team, Boldin is widely considered as one of the greatest wide receivers of his era.

== Early life ==
Boldin played football, basketball, and ran track at Pahokee High School. His ability playing as a quarterback led him to be named Florida's Mr. Football in 1998. During his senior season, Pahokee held a 10–0 regular season record including a 34–14 win over Glades Central in the annual Muck Bowl. After the season, he was a USA Today first-team selection and named Florida Player of the Year.

Also a standout track athlete, Boldin competed in sprinting, jumping and throwing events at Pahokee High. He was timed at 52.34 seconds over 400 meters. In jumps, he recorded a personal-best leap of 6.13 meters in the long jump. As a thrower, he got a top-throw of 13.53 meters in the shot put.

In 2007, he was named to the Florida High School Association All-Century Team, a team compiled of the top 33 players in the 100-year history of high school football in the state of Florida.

== College career ==
Boldin attended Florida State University from 1999 to 2002. In the 2002 season, he had nine receptions for 175 receiving yards against Notre Dame, a three-touchdown game against North Carolina, and a two-touchdown game against rival Florida. He was converted to wide receiver in order to get more playing time. In 23 games at wide receiver, he caught 118 passes for 1,790 yards (averaging 15.2 yards per reception) and 21 touchdowns.

== Professional career ==
=== Pre-draft ===
Boldin created initial concerns of the NFL scouts after he registered a relatively slow 4.7 time in the 40-yard dash at the NFL Combine.

Pre-draft measurables
Height	Weight	Arm length	Hand span	40-yard dash	10-yard split	20-yard split	20-yard shuttle	Three-cone drill	Vertical jump	Broad jump
6 ft 0 5/8 in (1.84 m)	216 lb (98 kg)	30 in (0.76 m)	9 7/8 in (0.25 m)	4.71 s	1.61 s	2.77 s	4.33 s	7.35 s	33.5 in (0.85 m)	9 ft 6 in (2.90 m)
All values from NFL Combine

=== Arizona Cardinals ===
==== 2003 season ====
Boldin was selected in the second round by the Arizona Cardinals with the 54th overall pick in the 2003 NFL draft.

Boldin set an NFL record for most receiving yards by a rookie in his first game with 217 on ten receptions against the Detroit Lions. In Week 10, against the Pittsburgh Steelers, he had eight receptions for 118 receiving yards and one receiving touchdown in the 28–15 loss. Two weeks later, he had six receptions for 123 receiving yards and two receiving touchdowns in the 30–27 loss to the St. Louis Rams. In Week 14, against the San Francisco 49ers, he had nine receptions for 123 receiving yards and one receiving touchdown in the 50–14 loss to the San Francisco 49ers. In Week 16 against the Seattle Seahawks, he had ten receptions for 122 receiving yards and one receiving touchdown in the 28–10 loss.

As a rookie, he tied Billy Sims for most yards from scrimmage by a rookie in his first game (217), and holds the NFL record for most receptions in the first 26 games of an NFL career (157). He is also the fastest to record 300 career receptions (47 games) and finished the season with 101 catches, 1,377 receiving yards, and eight touchdowns. Boldin was the only rookie selected to the 2004 Pro Bowl. He was named to the PFWA All-Rookie Team. He was named Offensive Rookie of the Year by the Associated Press and the PFWA. In addition, he was named Sporting News Rookie of the Year.

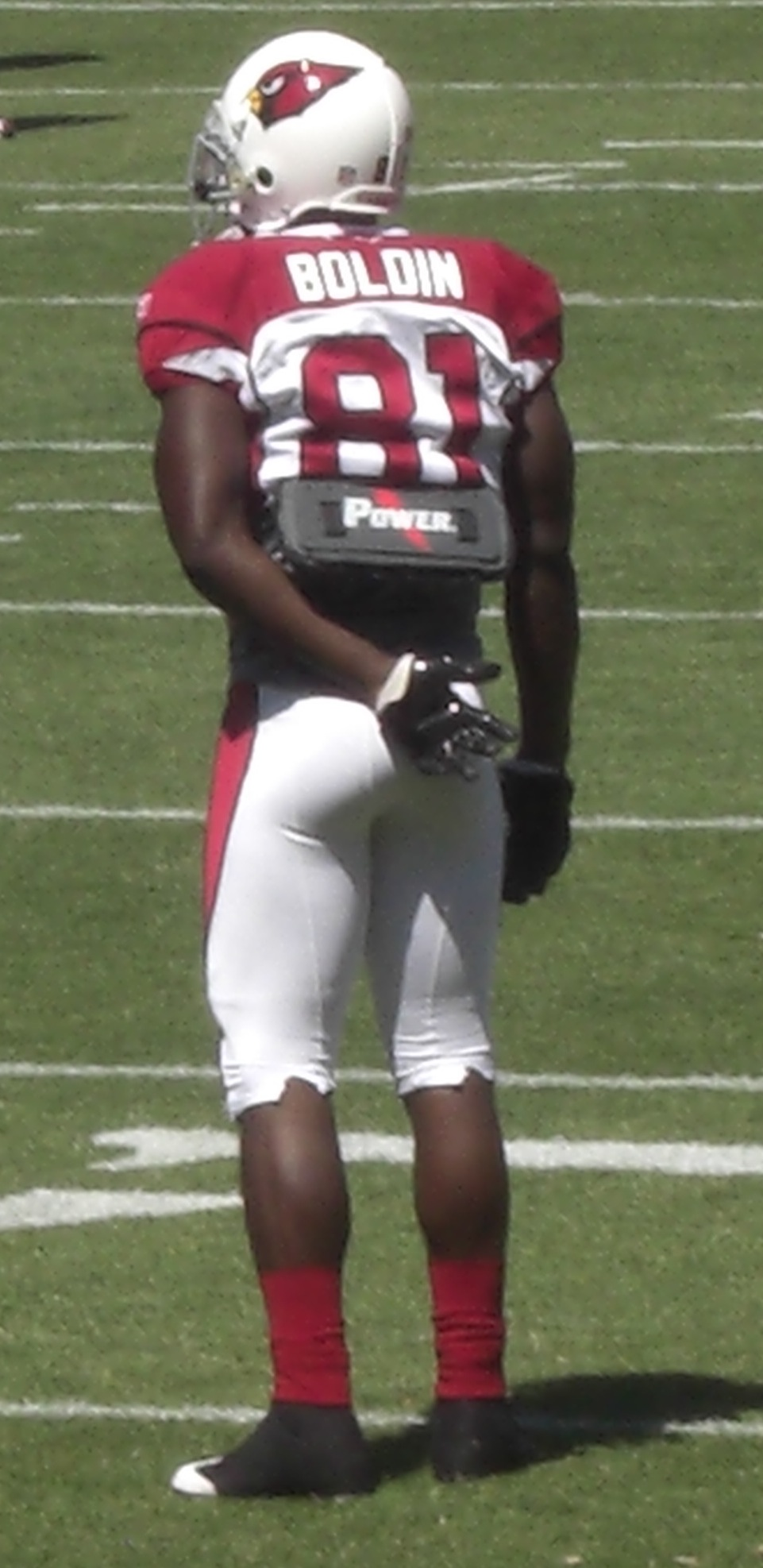
Boldin spent seven seasons with the Arizona Cardinals from 2003 to 2009 and was voted to three Pro Bowls during his tenure with the team. Here he is shown in September 2008.

==== 2004 season ====
Boldin suffered a right knee injury in training camp. He was inactive for the first six regular season games. In the 2004 season, Boldin finished with 56 receptions for 623 receiving yards and one receiving touchdown in ten games. He had two games going over 100 receiving yards on the year.

==== 2005 season ====
In Week 2, against the St. Louis Rams, Boldin had eight receptions for 119 receiving yards in the 17–12 loss. In Week 4, against San Francisco, he had eight receptions for 116 receiving yards and a touchdown in the 31–14 victory. In the following game, against the Carolina Panthers, he had ten receptions for 162 receiving yards and a receiving touchdown in the 24–20 loss. In Week 11, Boldin started a streak of five consecutive games going over the 100-yard mark. Arguably his finest moment came against the San Francisco 49ers on December 4 when he broke several tackles and scored the game-winning touchdown in a 17–10 win. He had 11 receptions for 156 receiving yards on the day. In Week 15 against the Houston Texans, he had eight receptions for 134 receiving yards and one receiving touchdown in the 30–19 loss. In the 2005 season, despite missing time with an injury, Boldin still caught more than 100 passes for over 1,400 yards. He led the league in receiving yards per game with 100.1. That year, he and fellow wide receiver Larry Fitzgerald became only the third duo from the same team to each catch over 100 receptions and top the 1,400-yard mark. They joined Detroit's Herman Moore and Brett Perriman, who accomplished the feat in 1995, and Denver Broncos tandem Ed McCaffrey and Rod Smith, who did it in 2000.

==== 2006 season ====
In Week 3, against the St. Louis Rams, Boldin had ten receptions for 129 receiving yards in the 16–14 loss. In Week 6, against the Chicago Bears, he had 12 receptions for 136 receiving yards and one receiving touchdown in the 24–23 loss. In Week 12, against the Minnesota Vikings, he had nine receptions for 140 receiving yards and one receiving touchdown in the 31–26 loss. After compiling 83 catches, 1,203 receiving yards and four touchdowns in 2006, Boldin was selected to play in his second Pro Bowl.

==== 2007 season ====
Boldin was named the offensive captain for the Cardinals for the 2007 season. In Week 3, against the Baltimore Ravens, he had 14 receptions for 181 receiving yards and two receiving touchdowns in the 26–23 loss. In Week 7, he had two receiving touchdowns in the 21–19 loss to Washington. In Week 16, against the Atlanta Falcons, he had 13 receptions for 162 receiving yards and two receiving touchdowns in the 30–27 victory. During the season, he became the fastest player in NFL history to compile 400 career receptions. In the 2007 season, Boldin recorded 71 receptions for 853 receiving yards and nine receiving touchdowns.

==== 2008 season ====
On September 28, 2008, Boldin was carted off the field after a violent helmet-to-helmet collision in the end zone with 27 seconds remaining in the Cardinals' 56–35 loss to the New York Jets. While attempting to catch a long pass from Kurt Warner, Boldin was hit in the back by free safety Kerry Rhodes and then took an illegal helmet-to-face shot from strong safety Eric Smith, knocking them both unconscious. Smith was able to get up after a few moments. After several minutes, Boldin was placed on a stretcher and carted off the field. Smith was fined $50,000 and suspended one game. Boldin left the game having caught 10 passes for 119 yards and a touchdown. On October 4, 2008, coach Ken Whisenhunt announced that Boldin would be out for an indefinite time period with fractured paranasal sinuses. Boldin returned three weeks later. He had 13 receptions for 186 receiving yards in a 26–20 victory over the Seattle Seahawks in Week 11. Fitzgerald, Boldin, and Steve Breaston, who filled in for the injured Boldin, became the fifth 1,000 yard receiving trio in NFL history.

In December 2008, he became the fastest player in NFL history to have 500 receptions. He was named to this third Pro Bowl for his performance in the 2008 season. On January 3, 2009, in his first post-season game, against the Atlanta Falcons in the Wild Card Round, Boldin had two catches for 72 yards with one touchdown. In the Super Bowl XLIII loss to the Pittsburgh Steelers, Boldin caught eight passes for 84 yards.

==== 2009 season ====
On May 26, 2009, according to ESPN's Mike Sando, Anquan Boldin fired agent Drew Rosenhaus. He later hired agent Tom Condon. In a Week 10 game against the Seattle Seahawks, Boldin became the fifth-fastest NFL player to record 7,000 receiving yards. He had three games going over the 100-mark and one game with two receiving touchdowns. He finished the 2009 season with 84 receptions for 1,024 receiving yards and four receiving touchdowns. He was inactive with a knee injury for the Cardinals' two postseason games.

=== Baltimore Ravens ===
==== 2010 season ====
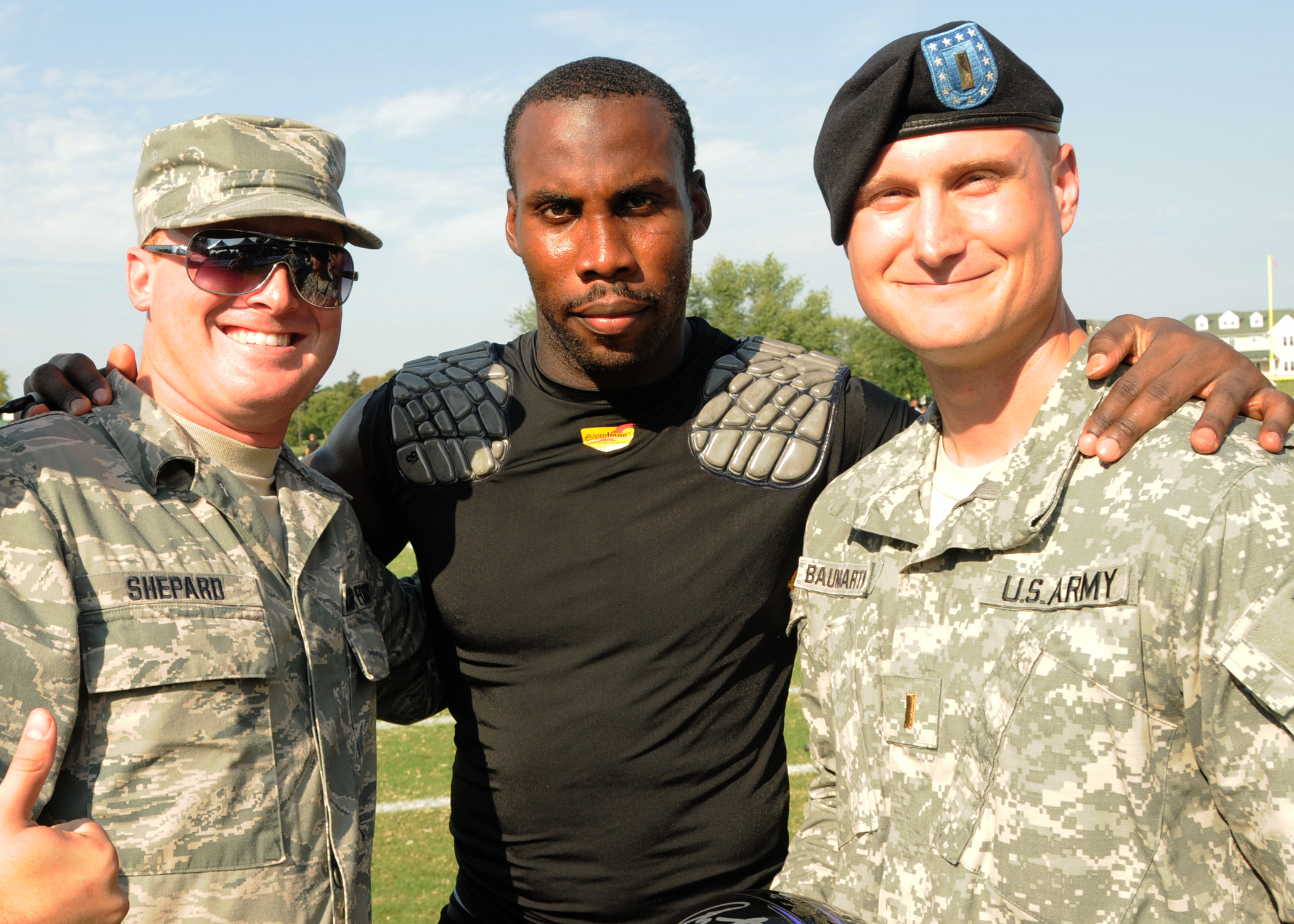
Boldin (center) with service members of the US Armed Forces while with the Ravens in 2010 at McDaniel College

On March 5, 2010, Boldin was traded to the Baltimore Ravens for the Ravens third and fourth-round picks in the 2010 NFL draft. The Ravens also received a fifth-round pick from the Cardinals as part of the deal. Boldin agreed to a three-year deal worth $25 million, in addition to the one year he had left on his then-current deal, bringing the total deal to $28 million over four years, with $10 million guaranteed.

In Boldin's Week 1 debut as a Raven, he caught seven passes for 110 yards, and was one of the few offensive players with strong contributions in the 10–9 defensive game eventually won over the New York Jets by Baltimore. In Week 3, against the division rival Cleveland Browns, Boldin caught eight passes for 142 yards and three touchdowns. He became the fastest player in NFL history to reach 600 receptions, doing so in just 98 games. Boldin won AFC Offensive Player of the Week honors for his performance. The Ravens faced their arch-rivals, the Pittsburgh Steelers, in Week 13 on Sunday Night Football. Boldin was the game's leading receiver with five catches, 118 yards, a 61-yard catch and a touchdown in Baltimore's 13–10 loss.

In his first season with the Ravens, Boldin recorded 64 receptions for 837 yards and seven touchdowns.

In the Wild Card Round of the playoffs, the Ravens took on the Kansas City Chiefs. Boldin caught five passes for 64 yards and a touchdown in the 30–7 rout. The following week, Boldin would only record one reception for −2 yards as the Ravens had their season ended in the Divisional Round with another loss to the Steelers.

==== 2011 season ====
Boldin had eight catches for 132 yards in a Week 6 victory over the Houston Texans. He continued his strong level of play the following week, catching seven passes for a season-high 145 yards as he helped the Ravens put together their biggest comeback win ever against his former team, the Arizona Cardinals.

Boldin finished the regular season as the Ravens leading receiver once again, catching 57 passes for 887 yards, topping his total from 2010, but also had four fewer touchdowns, only scoring three on the year.

In the Divisional Round, Boldin and the Ravens faced the Texans once again. He had four catches for 73 yards and a touchdown. He also caught a much-needed pass on the sideline with one hand. The Ravens would win 20–13 and move on to the AFC Championship Game.

Boldin had six catches for 101 yards in the AFC Championship game against the New England Patriots, but the Ravens eventually lost after a dropped touchdown pass by Lee Evans and a missed field goal by Billy Cundiff.

==== 2012 season ====
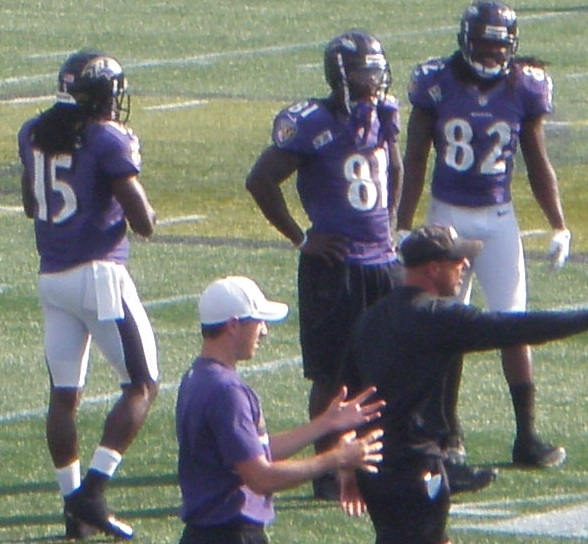
Boldin (81) at Navy–Marine Corps Memorial Stadium in 2012. Also pictured are LaQuan Williams (15) and Torrey Smith (82).

In a Week 4 primetime win against the Cleveland Browns, Boldin had a regular season-high nine catches for 131 yards. Boldin had two receiving touchdowns against Washington in Week 14. Boldin finished the 2012 regular season leading the Ravens in receiving yards for the third consecutive year. He caught 65 passes for 921 yards and four touchdowns.

In the Wild Card Round of the 2012 playoffs, Boldin had one of his best postseason performances as a Raven. He caught a 46-yard pass and an 18-yard touchdown pass from Joe Flacco in a 24–9 win over the Indianapolis Colts. He also set a franchise record of 145 receiving yards in a postseason game. In the Divisional playoff game against the Denver Broncos, Boldin caught six passes for 71 yards as he helped the Ravens pull off a 38–35 upset win. In the AFC Championship, Boldin had five catches for 60 yards and a pair of scores as the Ravens defeated the New England Patriots 28–13.

Boldin got his first championship title as the Ravens defeated the San Francisco 49ers, his future team, by a score of 34–31 in Super Bowl XLVII. He had six receptions for a total of 104 yards, scored one touchdown and had a long reception of 30 yards. He finished the postseason with 22 receptions, 380 yards and four touchdowns.

On the NFL Top 100 Players of 2013, Boldin was ranked 93rd by his fellow players.

=== San Francisco 49ers ===
==== 2013 season ====
On March 11, 2013, Boldin was traded to the San Francisco 49ers for a sixth-round pick in the 2013 NFL draft. On September 8, 2013, in the season opener against the Green Bay Packers which was also his debut game as a 49er, the 49ers defeated the Packers 34–28. Boldin racked up 208 yards and a touchdown on 13 receptions during that game. His Week 1 performance earned him NFC Offensive Player of the Week. He became the first wide receiver to ever gain over 100 yards for three different teams on his team debut. Boldin closed out the regular season with nine receptions for 149 receiving yards and one receiving touchdown in the 23–20 victory over the Arizona Cardinals. Boldin finished his first year with the 49ers with 85 receptions and 1,179 yards as well as seven touchdowns. He won the NFLPA Alan Page Community Award.

In the Divisional Round of the playoffs against the Carolina Panthers, Boldin had eight receptions for 136 receiving yards in the 23–10 victory. In the NFC Championship against the Seattle Seahawks, he had a receiving touchdown in the 23–17 loss.

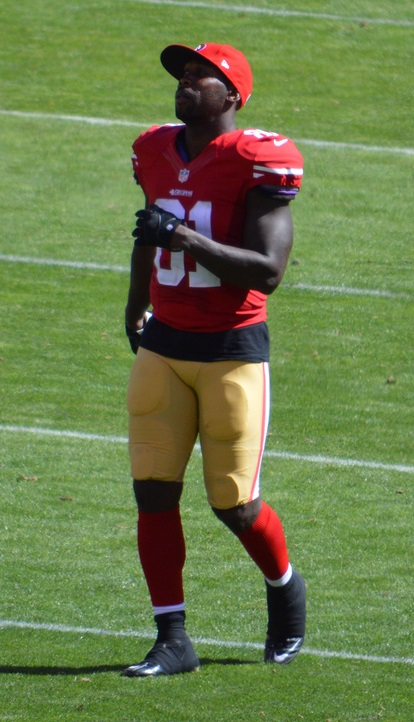
Boldin with the 49ers in 2013

==== 2014 season ====
On March 3, 2014, it was announced that Boldin and the 49ers had agreed on a new two-year, $12 million contract, keeping Boldin in San Francisco. In Week 12, against Washington, he had nine receptions for 137 receiving yards and one receiving touchdown in the 17–13 victory. In the 2014 season, Boldin finished with 83 receptions for 1,062 receiving yards and five receiving touchdowns.

==== 2015 season ====
In Weeks 5 and 6, Boldin recorded consecutive games going over the 100-yard mark against the New York Giants and Baltimore Ravens. On December 6, 2015, Boldin surpassed 13,000 career receiving yards in a Week 13 game against the Chicago Bears. In the 2015 season, Boldin had 69 receptions for 789 receiving yards and four receiving touchdowns. He won the NFL Walter Payton Man of the Year Award.

=== Detroit Lions ===
On July 28, 2016, Boldin signed with the Detroit Lions. He chose to wear 80 rather than 81 out of respect for the recently retired Calvin Johnson.

On September 11, 2016, in the season opening victory against the Indianapolis Colts, Boldin reached 13,230 yards for his career, moving ahead of Andre Reed for No. 16 all-time. On September 18, 2016, Boldin caught his 75th career touchdown (and first with the Lions) against the Tennessee Titans. On October 23, 2016, Boldin caught the game-winning touchdown with 19 seconds left against the Washington Redskins. In Week 14, against the Chicago Bears, Boldin reached 1,064 receptions for his career, moving him into 10th all time, passing Andre Johnson. Boldin finished the season with 67 receptions on 95 targets for 584 yards and eight touchdowns.

=== Buffalo Bills and retirement ===
On August 7, 2017, Boldin signed a one-year contract with the Buffalo Bills. He appeared in a preseason loss to the Eagles, catching one pass for five yards. On August 20, less than two weeks after joining the team, Boldin abruptly retired, saying "his life's purpose is bigger than football" and he intended to focus on humanitarian work.

An official retirement ceremony for Boldin took place with the Baltimore Ravens on October 14, 2019.

== Career statistics ==
Legend
	Won the Super Bowl
	Led the league
**Bold**	Career high

=== NFL ===
==== Regular season ====
Year	Team	Games		Receiving					Rushing					Fumbles	
Year	Team	GP	GS	Rec	Yds	Avg	Lng	TD	Att	Yds	Avg	Lng	TD	Fum	Lost
2003	ARI	16	16	101	1,377	13.6	71	8	5	40	8.0	23	0	3	**3**
2004	ARI	10	9	56	623	11.1	31	1	1	3	3.0	3	0	1	1
2005	ARI	14	14	**102**	**1,402**	13.7	54	7	**12**	45	3.8	11	0	2	1
2006	ARI	16	16	83	1,203	14.5	64	4	5	28	5.6	18	0	1	0
2007	ARI	12	11	71	853	12.0	44	9	1	14	**14.0**	14	0	2	1
2008	ARI	12	11	89	1,038	11.7	**79**	**11**	9	**67**	7.4	**30**	0	**4**	**3**
2009	ARI	15	15	84	1,024	12.2	44	4	3	12	4.0	5	**1**	3	2
2010	BAL	16	16	64	837	13.1	61	7	2	2	1.0	3	0	1	1
2011	BAL	14	14	57	887	**15.6**	56	3	—	—	—	—	—	0	0
2012	BAL	15	15	65	921	14.2	43	4	1	3	3.0	3	0	0	0
2013	SF	16	16	85	1,179	13.9	63	7	2	11	5.5	11	0	0	0
2014	SF	16	16	83	1,062	12.8	76	5	1	4	4.0	4	0	0	0
2015	SF	14	13	69	789	11.4	51	4	—	—	—	—	—	1	1
2016	DET	16	16	67	584	8.7	35	8	—	—	—	—	—	0	0
Career		202	198	1,076	13,779	12.8	79	82	42	229	5.5	30	1	18	13

==== Postseason ====
Year	Team	Games		Receiving					Rushing					Fumbles	
Year	Team	GP	GS	Rec	Yds	Avg	Lng	TD	Att	Yds	Avg	Lng	TD	Fum	Lost
2008	ARI	3	3	14	190	13.6	**71**	1	—	—	—	—	—	0	0
2010	BAL	2	2	6	62	10.3	27	1	—	—	—	—	—	0	0
2011	BAL	2	2	10	174	**17.4**	37	1	—	—	—	—	—	**1**	0
2012	BAL	4	4	**22**	**380**	17.3	50	**4**	—	—	—	—	—	0	0
2013	SF	3	3	16	227	14.2	45	1	—	—	—	—	—	0	0
2016	DET	1	1	2	24	12.0	16	0	—	—	—	—	—	0	0
Career		15	15	70	1057	15.1	71	8	—	—	—	—	—	1	0

=== College ===
Year	Team	GP	Receiving				Rushing			
Year	Team	GP	Rec	Yds	Avg	TD	Att	Yds	Avg	TD
1999	Florida State	10	12	115	9.6	2	4	33	**8.3**	**1**
2000	Florida State	12	41	664	**16.2**	6	1	8	8.0	0
2001	Florida State	0	did not play due to injury							
2002	Florida State	14	**65**	**1011**	15.6	**13**	**21**	**86**	4.1	0
Career		36	118	1790	15.2	21	26	127	4.9	1

== Career highlights ==
=== Awards and honors ===
NFL

- Super Bowl champion (XLVII)
- NFL Offensive Rookie of the Year (2003)
- Walter Payton NFL Man of the Year (2015)
- 3× Pro Bowl (2003, 2006, 2008)
- PFWA All-Rookie Team (2003)
- NFLPA Alan Page Community Award (2014)
- Ranked No. 93 in the Top 100 Players of 2013

College

- BCS national champion (1999)
- Brian Piccolo Award (2002)
- Second-team All-ACC (2002)

=== Records ===
==== NFL records ====
- Most receiving yards in first career game: 217
- Most receptions in the first 26 games of an NFL career: 157
- Fastest to record 400 career receptions (in 67 games)
- Fastest to record 500 career receptions (in 80 games) – since tied by Julio Jones

==== Cardinals franchise records ====
- Most receiving yards per game average in a season: 100.1 (2005)
- Most receptions per game average in a season: 7.4 (2008)
- Most receptions per game average (career): 6.2
- Most receiving TDs by a rookie (tied with Larry Fitzgerald and Marvin Harrison Jr.): 8.

==== Ravens franchise records ====
- Most post-season receiving yards in a game: 145

== Personal life ==
Boldin has a brother, DJ Boldin, who is the offensive coordinator at NCAA Division I FCS Hampton.He is a cousin of C. J. Jones, and the deceased Corey Jones, who gained national attention after being illegally shot and killed by the Palm Beach Gardens police in 2015. Other cousins include Philadelphia Eagles quarterback, Joe Milton, and basketball player Cayden Daughtry.

Boldin is a Christian. With the Baltimore Ravens, Boldin would often lead Bible study in the locker room.

Boldin established the Anquan Boldin Foundation aka Q81 Foundation in 2004. The Foundation is dedicated to expanding the educational and life opportunities of underprivileged children and has a track record for sustaining programs in multiple cities. As evidenced by the charitable activities in Arizona, Baltimore and Boldin's home state of Florida, the Q81 Foundation has its annual Q-Festival Weekend, Holiday Turkey Drive and Shopping Spree, and Q81 Summer Enrichment Program partnered with Florida Crystals The Foundation exercises scholarship and dental programs for children. It also serves the community by rewarding great scholastic and community achievement in youth.

In March 2012, Boldin and former Cardinals teammate Larry Fitzgerald went to Ethiopia, where they volunteered to move rocks to create arable land.

== See also ==
- List of NFL career receptions leaders
- List of NFL career receiving yards leaders
- List of NFL career receiving touchdowns leaders
