= Cayden Daughtry =

American basketball player (born 2009)

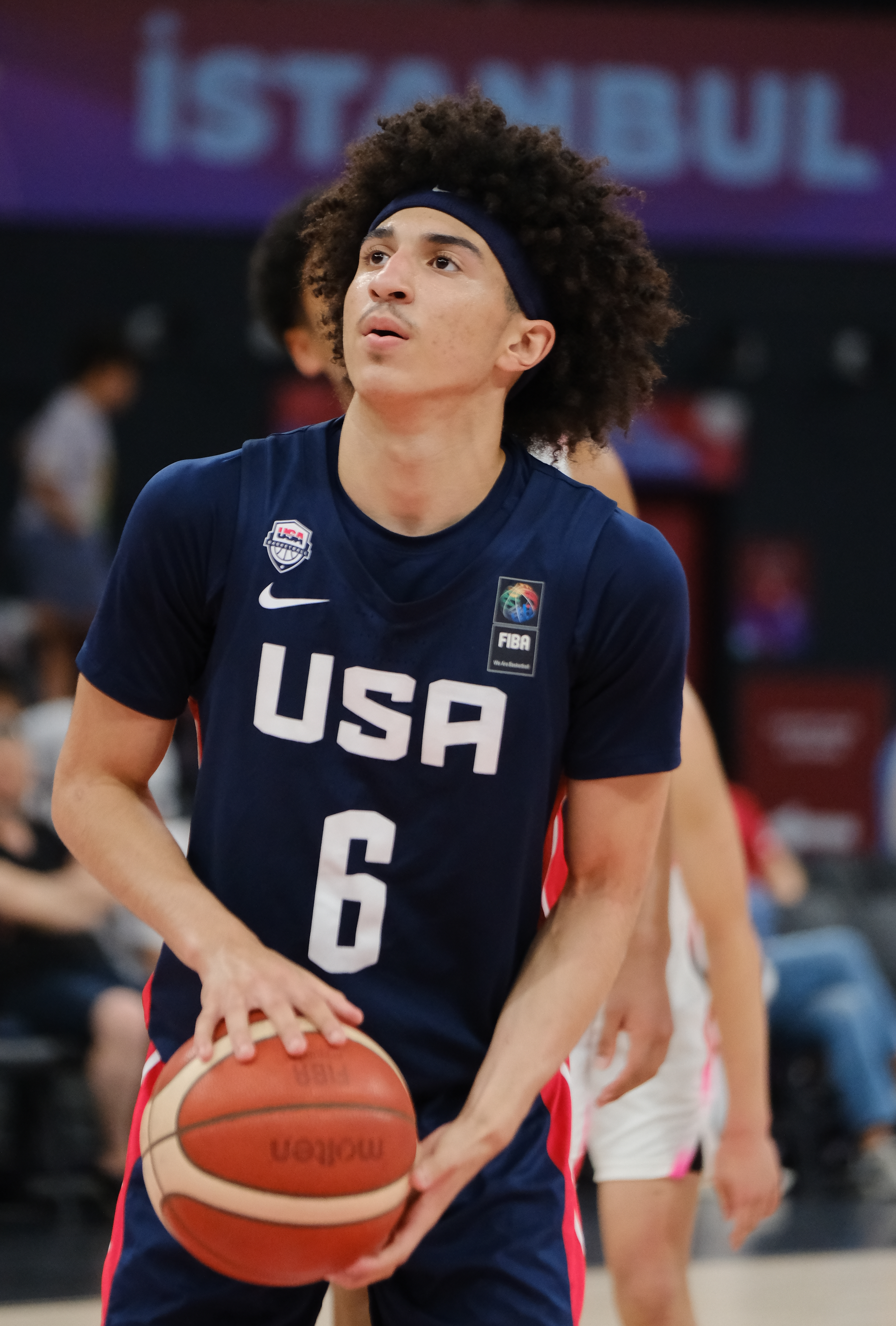
- Daughtry in 2026

No. 3 – CCA Eagles
- Position: Point guard

Personal information
- Born: April 10, 2009 (age 17)
- Listed height: 6 ft 1 in (1.85 m)
- Listed weight: 160 lb (73 kg)

Career information
- High school: Calvary Christian Academy (Fort Lauderdale, Florida)

Career highlights
- MaxPreps National Junior of the Year (2026)
Medals
Representing the United States
Men's basketball
FIBA Under-17 World Cup
Gold medal – first place	2026 Turkey	Team

Cayden Daughtry (born April 10, 2009) is an American high school basketball player who attends Calvary Christian Academy in Fort Lauderdale, Florida. He is a five-star recruit in the class of 2027, earning MaxPreps National Junior of the Year in 2026.

== Early life ==
Daughtry was born on April 10, 2009, the son of Dawn and Chivalrik Daughtry. As a middle school student, he played varsity basketball for the Somerset Academy Canyons starting in seventh grade in his hometown of Boynton Beach, Florida. In ninth grade, Daughtry attended Calvary Christian Academy in Fort Lauderdale, and was teammates with Shon Abaev his first two seasons. As a junior, Daughtry led Calvary Christian to a 24–1 record and won a second consecutive Florida Class 3A state championship. He was awarded the MaxPreps Florida Player of the Year and the MaxPreps National Junior of the Year, after averaging 26.5 points, 5.2 assists, 4.5 rebounds and 2.7 steals, while shooting 54.5% from the floor and 36.8% on three-point attempts. Additionally, he was the only junior in the country to be selected as a USA Today All-American; earning second-team honors. Daughtry was also awarded the Broward County Class 3A-1A Player of the Year by the Miami Herald.

Daughtry also plays for Fear of God Athletics in Overtime Elite and the Florida Rebels in the Nike Elite Youth Basketball League (EYBL). After moving up an age group, he was the full-season Underclass MVP in the 2025 Nike U17 EYBL after averaging 20.6 points per game. In Overtime Elite, Daughtry averaged 20.5 points per game as a sophomore in 2024–25 and 29.1 points as a junior in 2025–26. In the 2026 Nike U17 EYBL, he led the league in scoring as he led the Florida Rebels to the Peach Jam with the No. 1 record. He averaged 23.7 points per game and was second with 6.6 assists per game through session III, and averaged 32.7 points per game in session IV to finish with a total of 25.6 points, 6.0 assists, 5.2 rebounds and 1.8 steals per game; shooting 55% from the field. Daughtry outdueled Adan Diggs and Demarcus Henry of Vegas Elite, scoring 37 points against two fellow top-10 prospects, who combined for 39 points. Following his efforts, Sam Vecenie of The Athletic called Daughtry the best high school player in the country. 247Sports director of college basketball Kyle Tucker also called him the best player in the nation and 247Sports said Daughtry had one of the most incredible summers by a point guard before their senior season that they had ever seen. They said they saw flashes of Trae Young and Steph Curry in him. ESPN also labeled Daughtry as a direct NBA comparison to Trae Young.

In the 2026 Nike EYBL Peach Jam, Daughtry broke the five-game pool play scoring record previously held by Cam Thomas (29.5 ppg), averaging 34.8 points per game. This included a triple-overtime performance where he scored a single-game all-time record 43 points and made two buzzer-beaters. He was so dominant that Nike in their 30th Peach Jam created an MVP award and presented it to Daughtry during the semifinals. He went on to lead the Florida Rebels to their first Peach Jam championship. In eight games, Daughtry finished the Peach Jam averaging 32.2 points, 6.1 assists, 4.9 rebounds, 2.9 steals and 2.0 turnovers per game. He shot 59% from the field, 49% on three-point attempts and 91% on free throws. Daughtry led the Peach Jam in scoring, steals and was third in assists.

=== Recruiting ===
Daughtry is rated as a five-star recruit in the class of 2027. He is ranked as the No. 1 overall player in the nation by The Field of 68 and No. 3 overall by 247Sports. Additionally, ESPN has him ranked as a top 10 player and Rivals has him ranked inside the top 20. After his sophomore season, he held offers from Florida State, Mississippi State, Arizona State and West Virginia. As of June 2026, Daughtry held additional offers from Florida, Illinois, Iowa, Kentucky, Louisville, Miami, Michigan, UConn, Villanova and Virginia, amongst others following his junior season. He had his first two unofficial visits to Michigan and Miami, and set an official visit to Iowa in September 2026.

== National team career ==
In October 2024, Daughtry first attended the USA Basketball Junior National Team minicamp in Colorado Springs, Colorado. In May 2025, he was a finalist for the United States national team that played in the 2025 FIBA U16 AmeriCup, but was not selected among the final cuts. In June 2026, Daughtry made the 12-man roster on the United States national team competing at the 2026 FIBA Under-17 World Cup in Turkey. In the championship game, Daughtry scored 15 points against Serbia to help lead the USA to a gold medal. He finished the tournament averaging 11.7 points, 4.7 assists, 3.4 rebounds and 1.1 steals per game, while shooting 56.8% from the field and 45% from three-point range. His assists were top-10 in the World Cup.

== Personal life ==
Daughtry is the cousin of 14-year National Football League (NFL) veteran, Anquan Boldin. His father, Chivalrik, played professional arena football for the Spokane Shock and passed for over 5,000 yards at Morehouse College. He is also the cousin of Brad Banks and C. J. Jones, star players on the 2002 Iowa football team, and the deceased Corey Jones, who his father was a pallbearer for.
