= Christian Gaddis =

American football player (born 1984)

No. 63, 61
- Position: Center

Personal information
- Born: October 5, 1984 (age 42); Jacksonville, Florida, U.S.
- Listed height: 6 ft 1 in (1.85 m)
- Listed weight: 300 lb (136 kg)

Career information
- College: Villanova
- NFL draft: 2007: undrafted

Career history
- Buffalo Bills (2007); Cleveland Browns (2008)*; Indianapolis Colts (2008)*; New York Sentinels (2009); Buffalo Bills (2009-2010)
- * Offseason or practice squad member only

Awards and highlights
- First-team All-A-10 (2006); Third-team All-A-10 (2005)

Career NFL statistics
- Games played: 2
- Stats at Pro Football Reference

Christian Gaddis (born October 5, 1984) is an American former professional football player who was a center for the National Football League (NFL) . He was signed by the Bills as an undrafted free agent in 2007. He played college football for the Villanova Wildcats.

Gaddis was also a member of the Cleveland Browns, Indianapolis Colts, and New York Sentinels.

== Early life ==
Gaddis attended Miami Country Day School in Miami, Florida, where he earned varsity letters in football, basketball and lacrosse. He was named to the All-Conference Team as a senior, was the team MVP in 2001, a first-team All-Dade County football performer in 2000 and 2001 and named second-team All-State in both 2000 and 2001. He totaled 232 tackles, 16 sacks, 10 forced fumbles and seven fumble recoveries during his high school career.

== College career ==
As a senior in 2006, Gaddis served as team captain, earned first-team All-Atlantic 10 accolades and started all 11 games at center. He finished his Wildcat career starting 33 consecutive games, helping the Villanova offense average 337.8 yards of total offense per game, including 143.3 rushing yards per contest and 194.5 passing yards per game. He majored in communications with a minor in psychology.

== Professional career ==
2007 Season
Signed with the Buffalo Bills practice squad as an undrafted rookie free agent on May 3, 2007. Was promoted to the 53-man active roster halfway through his rookie season.

2008 Season
Gaddis started all four preseason games for the Buffalo Bills before being released on August 30, 2008. He signed with the Cleveland Browns two days later. Gaddis was released by the Browns on October 28 and signed with the Indianapolis Colts on November 28. He was released in late November, signing with the UFL's New York Sentinels.

2009 Season
Gaddis joined the Buffalo Bills practice squad for the second time on November 18, 2009, and was immediately promoted to the 53-man active roster on November 25.

2010 Season
Gaddis was re-signed to the Buffalo Bills on April 2, 2010, and released on September 4, 2010. Gaddis officially retired from the NFL in late 2010.

== Internships ==
Gaddis shadowed at Travers Collins in March 2010, which led to an offseason internship with the New Era Cap Company.

== Personal life ==
Gaddis married Danielle Moran on July 10, 2010.
