= Killing of Corey Jones =

2015 police killing

Corey Jones
- Born: Corey Lamar Jones; February 3, 1984; Boynton Beach, Florida, U.S.
- Died: October 18, 2015 (aged 31); Palm Beach Gardens, Florida, U.S.
- Cause of death: Manslaughter (gunshot wounds)
- Education: University of Akron
- Occupations: Housing Authority Inspector; Assistant Property Manager; Musician
- Relatives: C. J. Jones (brother)

Corey Jones (February 3, 1984 – October 18, 2015) was shot to death by police officer Nouman K. Raja, while waiting for a tow truck by his disabled car, in Palm Beach Gardens, Florida.

Raja, who was in plainclothes and in an unmarked white van, approached Jones, who was waiting by his disabled vehicle on a highway exit ramp. Within seconds, Raja fired six shots at Jones, striking him three times. After the shooting, Raja falsely claimed to investigators that he had identified himself as a police officer and shot Jones in self-defense; both assertions were disproved by an audio recording of the fatal shooting.

On June 1, 2016, Raja was charged with manslaughter by culpable negligence and attempted first-degree murder with a firearm. He was convicted of the charges on March 7, 2019, following an eight-day jury trial. Raja was sentenced to 25 years in prison on April 25, 2019.

== Corey Jones ==
Jones was born to father Clinton Jones Sr., who renovated houses, and mother, Anita Banks, a guidance counselor, who died from cancer in 2006. Jones' older brother, C. J. Jones, was a football player at University of Iowa and from 2003 to 2009 played as a wide receiver in the National Football League (NFL). Jones' sisters are Melissa Jones-Elliott and Chanda and Cevon Jones; his stepmother is Katie Jones. Jones was black, and had a very large extended family; among his cousins are NFL defensive tackle Vince Wilfork and NFL wide receiver Anquan Boldin. As well as cousins of Chivalrik and Cayden Daughtry. He lived in Lake Worth Beach, Florida.

Jones attended Christa McAuliffe Middle School in Boynton Beach, Florida, where he played the French horn. His entire family was musical, and played instruments at home and at church. Jones graduated from Santaluces Community High School in Lantana, where he played football. Jones then graduated from the University of Akron with degrees in business administration and music. He worked as a youth mentor at My Brother's Keeper, a nonprofit organization that helps African-American youths.

Jones worked at the Delray Beach Housing Authority for eight years. He was an inspector/assistant property manager, a job that involved inspecting housing units to make sure they were livable. The position also required assisting tenants and landlords with communication.

Jones also worked part-time as a drummer. He played in a band at his church, the Bible Church of God in Boynton Beach, where his grandfather, Sylvester Banks Sr., is a bishop. He also played with a band called Future Prezidents with bandmates that included Boris Simeonov and Mathew Huntsberger.

== Nouman Raja ==
Nouman Raja is a Muslim of Pakistani ancestry. He was naturalized as an American citizen in 2001. His grandfather was a police chief in Pakistan. He worked for a small Florida police department for several years prior to joining the Palm Beach Gardens police. Raja is married with two children.

== Death ==
On Sunday, October 18, 2015, at about 3:15 am, Nouman K. Raja, working as a plainclothes police officer wearing a T-shirt, jeans, and a baseball cap, in an unmarked white van with tinted windows, stopped by what he said was an abandoned vehicle at the southbound exit ramp of Interstate 95 and PGA Boulevard. Raja, on duty doing burglary surveillance, said he was confronted by an armed subject, so he discharged his weapon and killed the man later identified as Jones. In total, Raja discharged his weapon six times and hit Jones with three shots. One bullet entered the side of Jones' body, went through his aorta, killing him, and ended up in the top part of his torso, while the other bullets went through his body, hitting his left elbow and right shoulder. Jones' arm was broken from the impact of one of the bullets.

Raja was not wearing a body camera and his vehicle was not equipped with a dashcam.

Jones, who was driving a Hyundai Santa Fe, had car trouble and first called his brother, C.J. Jones, who offered to come help him. Jones was due in church the next morning and needed his car so he told his brother not to come pick him up. Jones' bandmate, Huntsberger, came to help, bringing oil, but they were not able to get the car running. Jones called for a tow truck; with that assurance, Huntsberger left. Jones had been returning home to Boynton Beach, after playing a show in Jupiter, Florida, at Johnny Mangos Tiki Bar and Grill. He had been playing with his band, the Future Prezidents. Jones was on the phone with AT&T roadside assistance when he was approached by the police officer. He had also called Florida Highway Patrol's line for assistance and AT&T #HELP multiple times trying to get help. Jones was using his government-issued work phone, so the records are available under state law.

Jones' body was found 80–100 feet (24–30 m) away from his vehicle, from which he appeared to have run. Jones had a .380-caliber gun, which he had purchased three days prior to the shooting and for which he had a concealed carry license. It was found on the ground between Jones' body and his car and had not been discharged.

== Investigation and response ==
The Palm Beach County Sheriff's Office conducted an independent investigation of the incident. The Palm Beach Gardens Police Department released a 90-page personnel file on Raja. The FBI assisted the Palm Beach County Sheriff's Office in its investigation.

Raja was an adjunct police academy instructor at Palm Beach State College, where he taught part-time. He was put on administrative leave from the college, as well as the police department, which is normal policy when an officer-involved shooting occurs. Raja previously worked at Atlantis Police Department in Atlantis, Florida, from 2008 to 2015. On November 11, 2015, Raja's employment with the Palm Beach Gardens Police Department, which was in a six-month probationary status from hire date April 13, 2015, was terminated. Around the same time, Raja's employment with Palm Beach State College ended, as a condition of his employment was his job working in the criminal justice system.

Jones' family is represented by Benjamin Crump, who represented the family of Trayvon Martin, as well as attorneys Daryl D. Parks, Kweku A. Darfoor, and Skinner Louis. On October 31, a funeral for Jones was held at Payne Chapel AME Church in West Palm Beach. Apostle Sharon Walker delivered the eulogy. Reverend Al Sharpton delivered words to the family.

== Criminal conviction of Raja ==
On June 1, 2016, a grand jury charged Raja with manslaughter by culpable negligence and attempted first-degree murder with a firearm. Palm Beach County State Attorney Dave Aronberg announced that the grand jury concluded Raja had no justification to shoot Jones, and the charging documents "allege that Raja never identified himself to Jones as a police officer as he drove up to the stranded motorist, yelled commands, and then opened fire."

Raja was arrested and his bond was set at $250,000. After making bail, Raja was released from the Palm Beach County Jail and placed under house arrest. A variety of conditions of pretrial release, including GPS monitoring and surrender of Raja's passport, were imposed.

On January 17, 2017, investigators publicly released evidence in the case, including "more than 3,000 pages of documents and 50 video and audio recordings," in response to a public records request made by the Palm Beach Post and nine other news outlets. Included in the evidence were audio tapes from the phone calls to AT&T Roadside Assistance and 9-1-1 were released. Although Raja had told investigators previously that he had called 9-1-1 before shooting Jones, the audio recording of Jones' roadside assistance call showed the final shot had been fired 33 seconds before Raja dialed. The recording also showed that Raja never identified himself to Jones as a police officer. In a State Attorney's Office report released on January 17, 2017, prosecutors state that Officer Raja lied to investigators, giving an account of events that contradicted the evidence.

On January 18, 2018, defense attorneys for Raja filed a motion to dismiss all charges citing Florida's "stand your ground" laws. In the motion, Raja claims that he identified himself as a police officer as he exited the van, that Jones "immediately jumped out, saying 'I'm okay, man'" as he approached the vehicle, and that Jones then "immediately drew a gun and pointed it at Officer Raja." Defense attorneys claim that Raja "repeatedly yelled for [Jones] to put his hands up and to 'drop the gun.'" Raja further stated he saw the silver muzzle pointing at him, and that he believed the gun was equipped with a red laser.

On March 7, 2019, Raja was found guilty of manslaughter by culpable negligence and attempted first-degree murder with a firearm, following an eight-day jury trial. On April 25, 2019, Raja was sentenced to 25 years in prison. Raja's scheduled release date is February 27, 2044, but under Florida Parole and Probation guidelines his minimum release date is May 29, 2040. As of September 2019, Raja was being held at the Wakulla Correctional Institution in Crawfordville, a minimum- to medium-security-level prison southeast of Tallahassee. Raja was the first Florida police officer in 30 years to be convicted in connection with an on-duty shooting.

== Civil suit against City and Raja ==
On July 6, 2016, the family of Corey Jones filed a wrongful death suit, naming the City of Palm Beach Gardens and Raja as defendants. It ended on February 23, 2023 with a $2,000,000 settlement.

== Memorial ==
External videos
- NFL "Inspire Change" commercial narrated by Anquan Boldin NFL YouTube video

On February 2, 2020, during the broadcast of Super Bowl LIV, the shooting death of Corey Jones was featured in a 60-second commercial sponsored by the Players Coalition and narrated by Jones' cousin, Anquan Boldin. Boldin, a former NFL wide receiver, co-founded the Players Coalition to focus on criminal justice reform, police community relations, and economic advancement.

== See also ==
- List of killings by law enforcement officers in the United States, October 2015
