= Eli Abaev =

American-Israeli basketball player (born 1998)

Eli Abaev אלי אבייב
Free agent
- Position: Power forward / center
- League: Liga Leumit

Personal information
- Born: December 13, 1998 (age 27)
- Listed height: 6 ft 8 in (2.03 m)
- Listed weight: 210 lb (95 kg)

Career information
- High school: Zion Lutheran (Deerfield Beach, Florida)
- College: Eastern Florida State (2016–2018); Austin Peay (2019–2020); Florida Gulf Coast (2020–2021)
- NBA draft: 2021: undrafted
- Playing career: 2021–present

Career history
- 2021–2022: Hapoel Be'er Sheva
- 2022–2023: Maccabi Haifa
- 2023–2024: Ironi Nahariya
- 2024–2025: Elitzur Yavne
- 2025–2026: Ironi Nahariya

Eli Abaev (Hebrew: אלי אבייב; born December 13, 1998) is an American-Israeli professional basketball player, who most recently played for Ironi Nahariya of the Liga Leumit. He played college basketball for Eastern Florida State College, Austin Peay State University, and Florida Gulf Coast University. Abaev plays the power forward and center positions.

== Early life ==
Abaev was born in Israel and moved to the United States as a child. His hometown is Coral Springs, Florida. Abaev is Jewish. He is 6 ft 8 in (203 cm) tall. He weighs 205 pounds (93 kg).

He played at Zion Lutheran High School in Deerfield Beach. There, Abaev averaged 12 points and eight rebounds per game on 56% shooting from the floor for the Lions.

== College ==
Abaev began his college career playing for Eastern Florida State College for two years. In 2016–17 in his first season, as the Titans were national runners-up, as a freshman he shot 59.8% from the floor, and had 7.4 rebounds per game. He was named to the 2017 National Junior College Athletic Association Division I Championship All-Tournament team.

In 2017–18, Abaev helped the Titans finish third in the NJCAA National Championship Tournament. He averaged 9.1 points and 9.8 rebounds (2nd in NJCAA Region 8) per game, shot 52.9% from the floor, and received First Team All-Mid-Florida Conference honors.

He transferred to Austin Peay State University, and in 2018–19, due to a lower-body injury, he redshirted.

As a redshirt junior in 2019–20 he played for Austin Peay. In 2019–20 Abaev averaged 7.9 points and 7.7 rebounds (4th in the Ohio Valley Conference) per game for the Austin Peay Governors, shooting 50.6% from the field.

Abaev then transferred and attended Florida Gulf Coast University, graduating in 2021. In 2020–21 he played for the Florida Gulf Coast Eagles. He averaged 7.1 points, 7.4 rebounds (3rd in the Atlantic Sun Conference), and 0.7 blocks (4th) per game.

== Professional career ==
=== Hapoel Altshuler Shaham Beer Sheva (2021–2022) ===
Abaev started his professional career playing for Hapoel Be'er Sheva in the Israeli Basketball Premier League, with whom he signed on June 21, 2021.

=== Ironi Nahariya (2023–2024) ===
On December 5, 2023, Abaev received a Hoops Agents National League Player of the Week award for Round 1. He had 26 points and 19 rebounds for his team to win.

=== Elitzur Yavne (2024–2025) ===
On November 30, 2024, he received a Hoops Agents National League Player of the Week award for Round 7. He had a double-double of 29 points and 15 rebounds. On December 16, 2024, he received another Hoops Agents National League Player of the Week award for Round 10. He had a double-double of 31 points and 13 rebounds. On February 13, 2025, he received a Hoops Agents National League Player of the Week award for Round 22. He had a triple-double of 36 points, 11 rebounds, and 10 assists. At the conclusion of the season, he was named Player of the Year, Domestic Player of the Year and First Team.

== International ==
Abaev played for Team USA in the 2019 European Maccabi Games, winning a gold medal and averaging 17.0 points and 15.3 rebounds in six games. In the gold medal game against Team Russia, he scored 23 points and had 28 rebounds.

== Personal life ==
Abaev's younger brother is Shon Abaev.

== See also ==
- List of select Jewish basketball players
