= Junior Engineering Technical Society =

National non-profit organization

- Formation: 1950
- Type: Non-profit organization
- Headquarters: Alexandria, Virginia
- Location: United States
- Official language: English
- President: Peter Carrato, Ph.D., P.E

Junior Engineering Technical Society (JETS) was a national non-profit organization based in the United States dedicated to promoting interest in science, mathematics, engineering, and technology among high-school students. In 2011, the Test of Engineering Aptitude, Mathematics, and Science (TEAMS) and Unite programs of JETS were acquired by the Technology Student Association

== History ==
The Junior Engineering Technical Society (JETS) was established in 1950 by Dean Lorin Miller and Harold Skamser with the mission to provide engineering education at the high school level in the same way that 4-H was designed for agriculture. The organization was formerly known as Better Engineering Talent for Schools (BETS) before its current name was adopted.

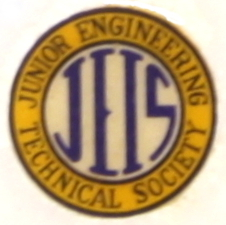
Logo of the Junior Engineering Technical Society as used in 1972

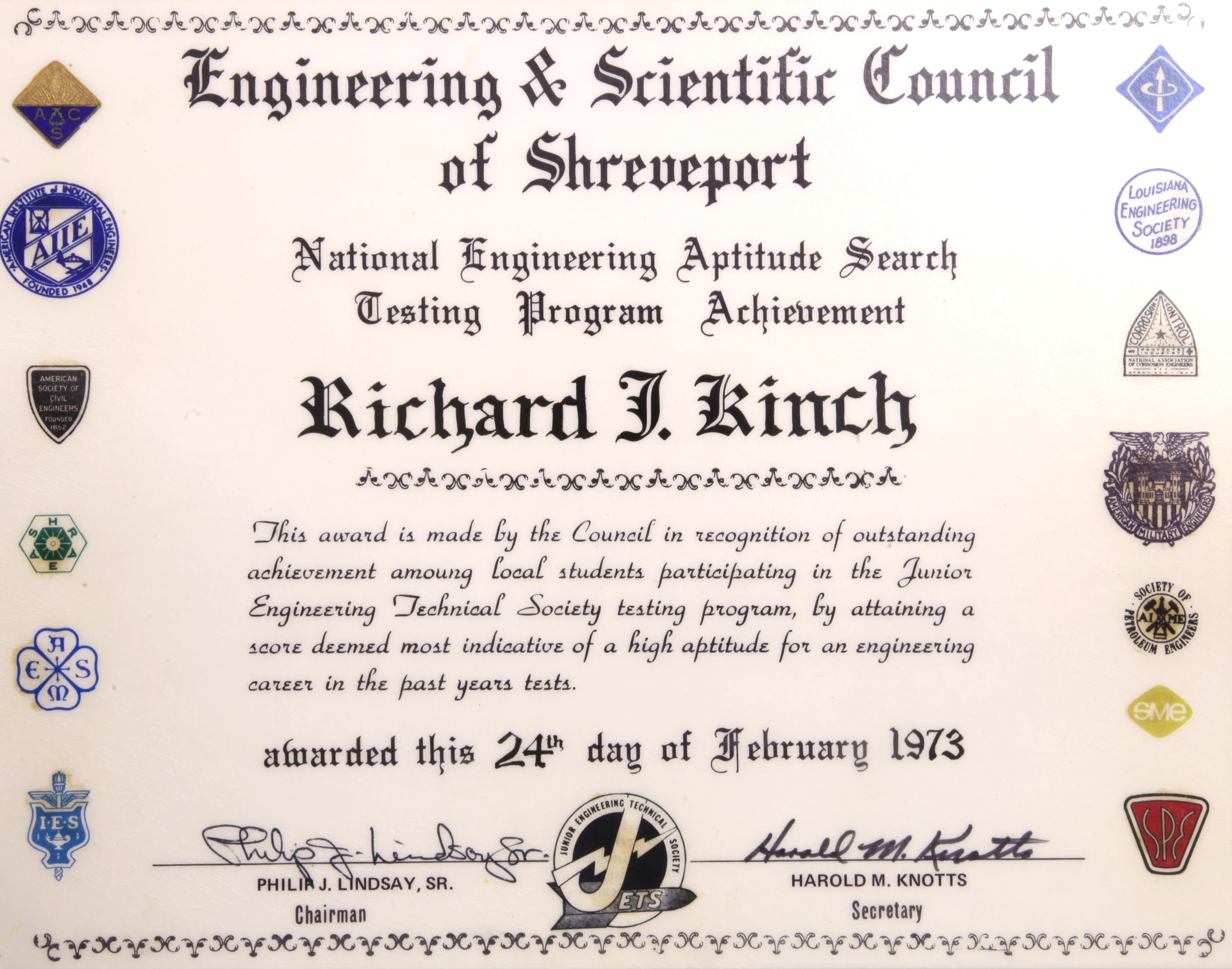
Example of the Junior Engineering Technical Society National Engineering Aptitude Search award, 1973

A key JETS activity was promulgating a standardized test to evaluate engineering aptitude in high school students, known as the "National Engineering Aptitude Search". A student's score could be a credential for admission application to an engineering college. The tests were administered by local JETS-affiliated engineering societies, who might also present awards to the top students.

== Activities ==
JETS hosts their annual TEAMS competition. TEAMS is an annual theme-based competition for students in grades 9–12, aimed at giving them the opportunity to discover engineering and how they can make a difference in the world. This competition is divided into two parts. The first part, lasting an hour and a half, has 80 multiple-choice questions. Each group of ten questions is related to a specific problem relating to the overall theme. The second part consists of eight open-ended tasks that are aimed at encouraging teamwork to develop the best answer. This competition is taken part by each participating school in a regional competition; the scores at that date determine the standings at the regional, state, and national levels. There are six school divisions, one home division, one group division, and two levels (9th/10th-grade level & 11th/12th-grade level).

== Scholarships ==
JETS, in conjunction with Power Engineering magazine, has annually awarded a $5,000 scholarship to at least one student to pursue a college engineering education since 2007.

== Praise and awards ==
In 2006, JETS was chosen as one of the "Best Practice" STEM education program for secondary schools by Bayer Corporation.

== Publications ==
Each month, JETS publishes a free e-newsletter available through their website.

JETS also publishes Explore, a magazine designed to inform students about potential engineering careers.
