= Shon Abaev =

Israeli basketball player (born 2006)

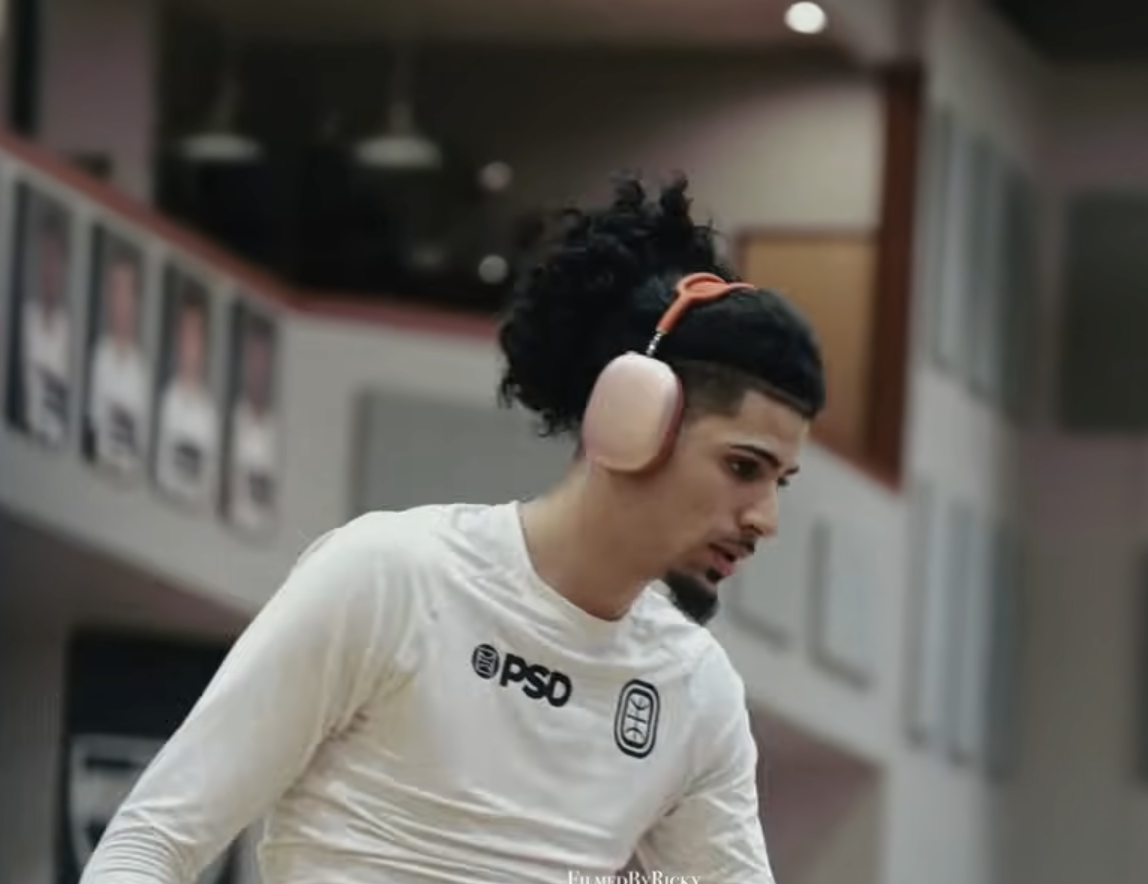
- Abaev in 2025

Florida State Seminoles
- Position: Small forward
- Conference: Atlantic Coast Conference

Personal information
- Born: February 26, 2006 (age 20) Israel
- Listed height: 6 ft 8 in (2.03 m)
- Listed weight: 210 lb (95 kg)

Career information
- High school: Miami Country Day (Miami-Dade County, Florida); Calvary Christian (Fort Lauderdale, Florida)
- College: Cincinnati (2025–2026); Florida State (2026–present)

Career highlights
- McDonald's All-American (2025)

Shon Abaev (born February 26, 2006) is an Israeli college basketball player for the Florida State Seminoles of the Atlantic Coast Conference (ACC). He previously played for the Cincinnati Bearcats.

== Early life ==
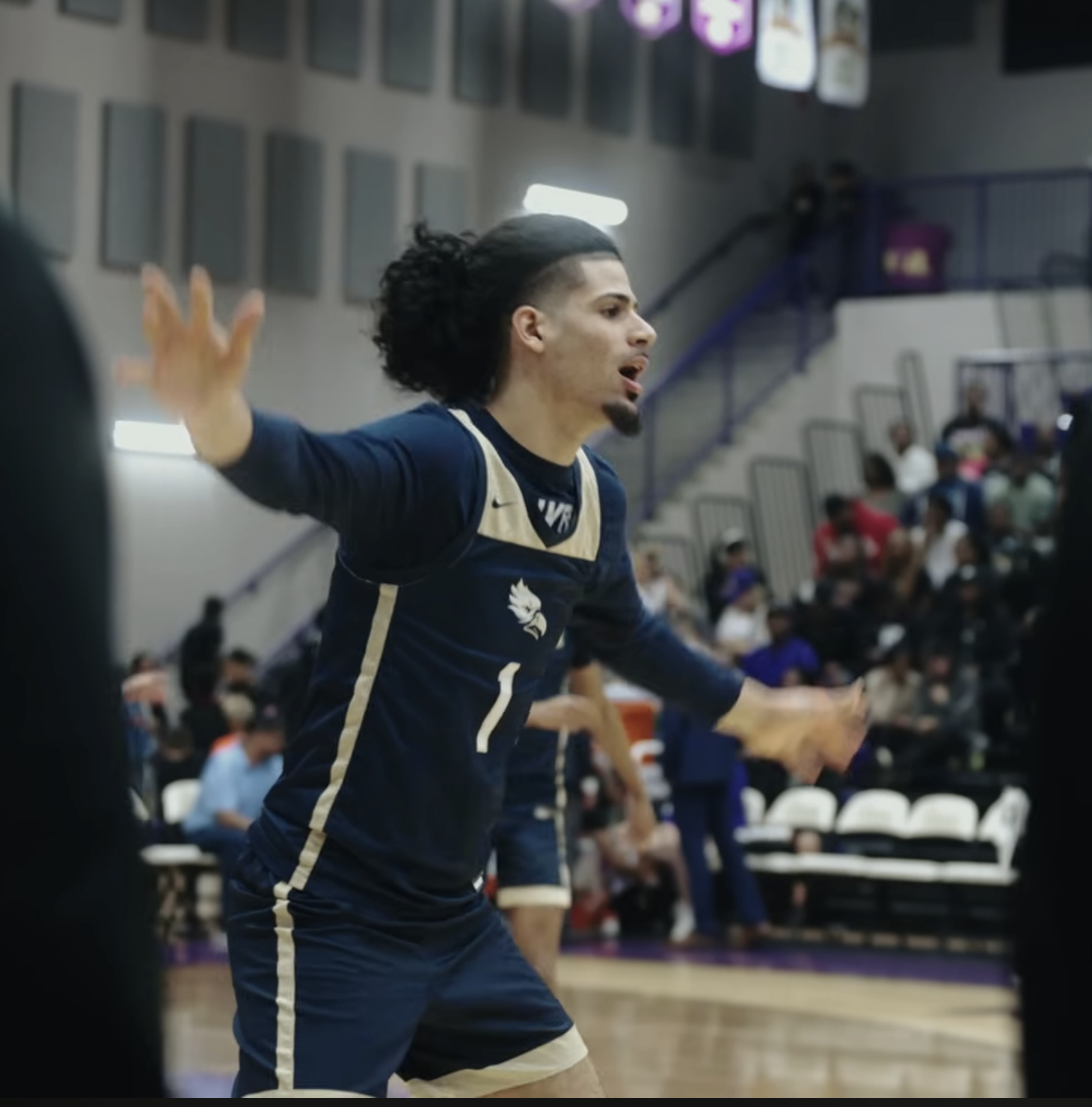
Abaev for Fear Of God vs. Montverde Academy in February 2025

Abaev was born in Israel and moved to Florida at age four. He first attended Miami Country Day School before transferring to Calvary Christian Academy in Fort Lauderdale. In addition to playing basketball at Miami Country Day and Calvary Christian, Abaev was a member of team Fear of God Athletics in the Overtime Elite league. He was teammates with Cayden Daughtry at Calvary Christian and on Fear of God, who was two years below him academically. In November 2024, he committed to play college basketball for the Cincinnati Bearcats before the start of his senior season. As a senior at Calvary Christian, Abaev averaged 20.9 points, 7.3 rebounds and 3.3 assists per game. He was awarded the Broward County Co-Class 4A-1A Player of the Year by the Sun Sentinel and the outright Broward Class 3A-1A Player of the Year by the Miami Herald after he led his team to a No. 5 national ranking and a Florida Class 3A state championship. He also averaged 24.1 points and 7.3 rebounds while playing in the Overtime Elite league. Abaev was ranked as a five-star recruit and a consensus top-30 player nationally, earning him a selection to the 2025 McDonald's All-American Game.

== College career ==
In an exhibition game prior to the 2025–26 season against Michigan, Abaev scored 15 points for the Bearcats. At the end of the season, Abaev entered the transfer portal.

== Personal life ==
Abaev's older brother is Eli Abaev.
