= List of killings by law enforcement officers in the United States, October 2015 =

This is a list of people reported killed by non-military law enforcement officers in the United States in October 2015, whether in the line of duty or not, and regardless of reason or method. The listing documents the occurrence of a death, making no implications regarding wrongdoing or justification on the part of the person killed or officer involved. Killings are arranged by date of the incident that caused death. Different death dates, if known, are noted in the description. The table below lists 95 people.

== October 2015 ==
Date	Name (Age) of Deceased	Race	State (City)	Description
2015-10-31	Bennie Lee Tignor (56)	Black	Alabama (Opelika)	
2015-10-31	Noah Jacob Harpham (33)	White	Colorado (Colorado Springs)	
2015-10-30	Floyd Ray Cook (62)	White	Kentucky (Burkesville)	
2015-10-30	Tony Berry (25)	Black	Texas (Houston)	
2015-10-30	Daniel Nole (30)	White	Oklahoma (Fort Gibson)	
2015-10-30	Brian Crawford (20)	Black	Texas (Houston)	
2015-10-30	Mario Martinez (29)	Hispanic	Texas (Mesquite)	
2015-10-29	Allen Quintez Swader (18)	White	Tennessee (Hohenwald)	
2015-10-29	Deaunte Lamar Bell (25)	Black	Ohio (Columbus)	
2015-10-29	Larry Busby (52)	White	Florida (Old Town)	
2015-10-28	Dehart, Andrew (36)	White	Oregon (Forest Grove)	Oregon State Police and U.S. Marshalls pursued Dehart who was wanted in connection with murder and kidnapping charges. The pursuit, during which Dehart fired at the pursuing officers, lasted for about 17 miles on U.S. Highway 26. Three officers ahead of the chase waited for Dehart's vehicle to approach their position and they shot as he drove toward them. He was hit and he died later at a local hospital.
2015-10-28	Ricky Keith Keeton (57)	White	Smithville, MS	
2015-10-28	Jerry Michael Graham Jr. (34)	Black	Florida (Jacksonville)	
2015-10-28	Adams, Jasper (36)	White	Oregon (Salem)	An Oregon State Police trooper attempted to pull Adams over for a traffic stop on Interstate 5 but Adams did not stop. Adams' vehicle went off the road and at least two State troopers approached the vehicle. When Adams aimed a handgun at them one of the troopers shot and killed him.
2015-10-27	Tyrie Cuyler (25)	Black	Georgia (Savannah)	
2015-10-27	Ashford, Anthony (29)	Black	California (San Diego)	An officer from the San Diego Harbor Police approached Ashford because he was looking into windows of parked cars. Ashford attacked the officer and as they struggled the officer's taser was triggered, striking both officers. Ashford tried to take the officer's weapon and the officer shot and killed him.
2015-10-26	Kobvey Igbuhay (18)	Asian	Florida (Tampa)	
2015-10-26	Marquesha McMillan (21)	Black	Washington, DC	
2015-10-26	Omar Miguel Lopez (24)	Hispanic	Philadelphia, PA	
2015-10-26	Brunson, Kevin (45)	Black	Maryland (Frederick)	Brunson was shot four times by a trooper at a Sheetz gas station after ramming the car of a Frederick police officer and lunging at the trooper. Police said Brunson had a large folding knife in his possession, but it was not clear whether he was holding it before he was shot.
2015-10-24	Hutchinson, Dominic (30)	Black	California (Cathedral City)	Hutchinson was shot and killed by Cathedral City police officers during their investigation of a domestic disturbance.
2015-10-24	Rolly Thomas (34)	Black	Cape Coral, FL	
2015-10-24	Darren Myron Fude (47)	White	Salem, WI	
2015-10-24	Jon Ployhar (49)	White	Sterling, AK	
2015-10-24	John Tozzi (61)	White	New Paltz, NY	
2015-10-24	Arthur W. West Jr. (28)	White	Zanesville, OH	
2015-10-24	Turner, John Harley (36)	White	Georgia (Talking Rock)	Turner was shot and killed by Pickens County deputies and Georgia State Troopers following a dispute between two hunters and Turner. A Pickens deputy initially fired bean bag rounds at Turner after entering the Turner property. Turner subsequently returned fire with his weapon so the officers and troopers shot and killed him. The confrontation between Turner and law enforcement lasted more than 45 minutes before the bean bag shots were fired.
2015-10-24	Ulloa, Juan (34)	Hispanic	California (Riverside)	When California Highway Patrol officers pulled over a vehicle for a traffic stop about 2 a.m., the driver got out of the vehicle and shot at the two officers, striking their car at least twice. The officers returned fire, wounding the man who then got back into his vehicle and drove away. He slammed into a fence and died at the scene.
2015-10-23	Charles A. Pettit (18)	Black	Midwest City, OK	
2015-10-22	Lawrence Green (38)	Black	Louisiana (Shreveport)	
2015-10-22	Stephen H. Brock (53)	White	Pine Top, KY	
2015-10-22	Ludd, Adrienne Jamarr (36)	Black	California (Carmichael)	After being pulled over for an expired registration, Ludd sped away from Sacramento County Sheriff deputies. When finally stopped, Ludd exited the vehicle armed with a handgun and aimed at the officers. The deputies fired several shots, killing Ludd.
2015-10-21	Mario Perdigone (36)	Hispanic	Texas (Corpus Christi)	
2015-10-21	Timothy Richard Arnold (47)	White	Kentwood, MI	
2015-10-21	Galena, Miguel Angel Marin (35)	Hispanic	California (Calexico)	A U.S. Customs and Border Protection officer shot Galena four times and killed him as Galena, holding a knife, approached the officer at the Calexico West Port of Entry.
2015-10-21	Rodriguez, Ryan Christopher (21)	Hispanic	California (West Goshen)	Rodriquez was shot by two officers of the Tulare County Sheriffs Department and the Farmersville Police Department as they were attempting to arrest him on a warrant for domestic violence charges. The two officers were participating in a multi-agency domestic violence detail.
2015-10-20	Jones, Lamontez (39)	Black	California (San Diego)	Two motorcycle officers from the San Diego Police Department attempted to contact a man they saw running in traffic causing a disturbance. As the officers chased him he pulled a semi-automatic pistol from his backpack and aimed it at the officers. When he refused orders to drop the gun, the officers shot him. He fell down but still refused orders to drop the weapon so the officers shot him again. He died shortly thereafter at a local medical facility. The gun he displayed turned out to be a replica.
2015-10-20	Roger D. Hall (30)	White	Kentucky (Louisville)	
2015-10-20	Darien Greenwood (30)	White	Mandeville, LA	
2015-10-20	Joel Lopes (40)	Hispanic	Truth or Consequences, NM	
2015-10-20	Kenneth Darryl Schick (47)	White	Wakarusa, KS	
2015-10-20	Grossman, Jonathan T. (21)	White	Iowa (Cedar Rapids)	Grossman was shot and killed by Cedar Rapids Police Officer Lucas Jones and other officers during a traffic stop. Police say the officers stopped the vehicle as part of a narcotics investigation. Grossman allegedly ran from the officers and pointed a gun at them before they killed him.
2015-10-19	Ramirez, Dion Lamont (40)	Black	California (Los Angeles)	Deputies from the Los Angeles County Sheriffs Department say they followed Ramirez car because he was driving recklessly. They followed him to a cul-de-sac where he turned around and a woman passenger got out of the car. Deputies say Ramirez then accelerated the car toward a deputy standing by his car. When he struck the car the deputy opened fire, killing Ramirez. The passenger says that Ramirez was in his car with his hands on the steering wheel when the deputies approached and shot him without provocation.
2015-10-18	Jones, Corey (31)	Black	Florida (Palm Beach Gardens)	Jones was an African-American man who was shot by an off-duty police officer while waiting by his disabled car in Palm Beach Gardens, Florida.
2015-10-18	Silviano Ortiz (37)	Hispanic	Harlingen, TX	
2015-10-18	Danny Leroy Hammond (50)	White	St. Cloud, MN	
2015-10-18	Ekizian, Krikor (28)	White	California (Fresno)	Fresno Police were called about 3:00 AM by a homeowner reporting an intruder. Before police arrived the man had grabbed a knife and left, running to his uncle's house nearby. The intruder, later identified as Krikor Ekizian, 28 stabbed his uncle several times. The police arrived and, along with a neighbor, gave aid to the victim. Ekizian came out from hiding and attacked the officer. The officer shot Ekizian four times, killing him.
2015-10-17	Cole, Rayshaun (30)	Black	California (Chula Vista)	Cole was shot and killed by his girlfriend at their apartment. Melissa Hayes-Spencer, 30, who is an officer with U.S. Customs and Border Protection, had called 911 to report the shooting, claiming it was in self-defense as her boyfriend was hitting her. She was arrested but released without being charged.
2015-10-17	Paterson Brown Jr. (18)	Black	Virginia (Richmond)	
2015-10-17	Dequan L. Williams (28)	Black	York, PA	
2015-10-17	Paredes, Gino (22)	Hispanic	California (Modesto)	After robbing a convenience store armed with a black-painted Airsoft pistol, Paredes was shot and killed by off-duty Modesto police officer Mike Callahan who was filling his car with gasoline and had seen him robbing the market.
2015-10-16	Ball, Ricky (26)	Black	Mississippi (Columbus)	Ball was a black man who was shot and killed by an officer from the Columbus, Mississippi Police Department when Ball fled from a traffic stop. Former Columbus Police Officer Canyon Boykin was initially charged with manslaughter in the case. Mississippi Attorney General Lynn Fitch announced on May 28, 2020, that all charges against Boykin would be dropped.
2015-10-16	Jason Foreman (45)	White	Winder, GA	
2015-10-16	Jarek Kozlowski (27)	White	Gardernville, NV	
2015-10-16	Jeffrey Womack (27)	White	Texas (Houston)	
2015-10-16	Rangel, Johnny Angel (25)	Hispanic	California (Valinda)	A Los Angeles County sheriff's deputy who responded to a call concerning a home intruder shot the man who grabbed for the deputy's gun after being verbally ordered to surrender. A knife – presumably belonging to the suspect – was found at the scene.
2015-10-15	Shurtz, David Elwood Jr. (54)	Unknown	California (Davis)	Davis Police officers were called to a motel where a man was heard screaming and breaking things inside his room. Officers say he was also reported as making statements about a gun. At least six officers arrived and attempted to talk to him to calm him down. Believing there might be another person in the room they broke through the door and attempted to restrain him, which he violently resisted. After he was handcuffed he stopped breathing and died despite CPR treatment by medics on the scene. A report from the Yolo County Coroner listed the cause of death as cardiorespiratory arrest during the struggle with officers brought on by Shurtz's methamphetamine intoxication.
2015-10-15	Martin Ryans (20)	Black	Texas (Houston)	
2015-10-15	Michael Brennan (31)	White	Ohio (Cleveland)	
2015-10-15	Jorge Santiago Tapia (15)	Hispanic	Homestead, FL	
2015-10-15	Robert Burgess, Jr. (35)	White	Kirkland, WA	
2015-10-15	Linda Lee Lush (50)	White	Las Vegas, NV	
2015-10-15	Kaleb Alexander (25)	Black	Columbus, OH	
2015-10-15	Benitez, Herbert (27)	Hispanic	California (San Francisco)	Two San Francisco Police officers tried to restrain Benitez when he was throwing glass bottles into the street and mumbling incoherently. As they grabbed his arms he resisted and wrestled with the officers, bringing one of them to the ground. When Benitez took the officer's gun, the other officer shot Benitez twice and killed him.
2015-10-15	Peña, Jonathan (27)	Unknown	California (West Hollywood)	Two pedestrians walking on the sidewalk of Santa Monica Boulevard were hit by a speeding patrol cruiser with its lights and sirens on which veered off the road. One male pedestrian died two hours later in a hospital while the other suffered serious injuries.
2015-10-14	Michelle Marie Burg (46)	White	Naples, FL	
2015-10-14	Leslie Portis (57)	Black	Evergreen, AL	
2015-10-14	Brent Andrew Brannon (27)	White	Cartersville, GA	
2015-10-14	Clark, Michael Donald (59)	White	California (Seaside)	Three Seaside Police officers responded to a call from Seaside Auto Mall of a man acting strangely. When police arrived the man shot at the officers. One of the officers shot Clark eight times, killing him. Monterey County District Attorney's office ruled the shooting justified.
2015-10-14	Villarreal, Samuel (18)	Hispanic	California (Indio)	Indio Police officers investigating an auto theft attempted to stop Villarreal as he drove a stolen vehicle into an apartment parking lot. Police say that when Villarreal backed his vehicle into a police car at least one officer opened fire. He was taken to a local hospital where he was pronounced dead.
2015-10-12	Rudolph "Toby" Smith (31)	White	Brookhaven, MS	
2015-10-12	Jason Day (40)	Black	Lawton, OK	
2015-10-11	Ortiz, Joe Pasquez (34)	Hispanic	California (San Bernardino)	San Bernardino Police officers responded to a 911 call from a seven-year-old girl who said two men were threatening to shoot her father. The victims pointed out two suspects who were said to be armed, one of whom was detained by the officers while the other fled on a bicycle. An office confronted the man in an alley and shot several rounds, killing him. No weapon has been reported found.
2015-10-11	Kevin Lau (44)	Asian	Lake Charles, LA	
2015-10-11	Robert Humberto Medellin (43)	Hispanic	Odessa, TX	
2015-10-11	Bernard Brandon Powers (23)	Black	Taylors, SC	
2015-10-10	Combs, William Daniel (38)	White	California (Piñon Hills)	San Bernardino County Sheriffs deputies responded to a report of a man inside a fenced facility of the Phelan Piñon Hills Community Services District. They found a man and a vehicle inside the facility. The man, who was acting irrationally, claimed to have a bomb and there was a standoff of several hours. When the man drove toward the deputies they shot and killed him.
2015-10-10	Anthony L. Aguilar Sr. (35)	Hispanic	Illinois (Lisle)	
2015-10-10	Christopher Whitmarsh (49)	White	Massachusetts (Beverly)	
2015-10-10	Travis LaQuay (40)	White	Michigan (Lakeview)	
2015-10-10	Love, Richard (31)	White	Connecticut (Old Saybrook)	Love, a suspect in several bank robberies, barricaded himself in his hotel room. When SWAT members entered his room, they shot Love, who they say pointed a gun at them.
2015-10-09	Wagner, Margaret (62)	White	California (Aguanga)	When a Riverside County Sheriffs deputy arrived at the scene of a domestic violence call, a woman pointed the gun at the deputy. The deputy shot her and she retreated inside the apartment. She was later found dead in the apartment.
2015-10-09	Gary Carmona Boitano (19)	Hispanic	Maryland (Columbia)	
2015-10-07	Amado Lago (46)	Hispanic	Florida (West Palm Beach)	
2015-10-06	Miller, Donald Thomas, II (36)	White	California (Monterey)	When Miller was seen "acting irrationally" and waving a gun in a public shopping area, some people called Monterey Police. The officer who arrived confronted Miller and fired six shots, killing Miller. The weapon was an old non-working revolver that Miller had stolen that day. Police arrested and released Miller earlier that day. Miller had mental health issues.
2015-10-05	James Dunaway (51)	White	Texas (Hurst)	
2015-10-05	Omar Ali (27)	Asian	Ohio (Akron)	
2015-10-05	Rodney Jencsik (50)	White	New Jersey (Woodbridge Township)	
2015-10-04	Eric Edgell (27)	White	Alabama (Muscle Shoals)	
2015-10-04	Jeffery McCallum (31)	Black	Illinois (Chicago)	
2015-10-03	Byrd, James Joseph (45)	White	California (Los Angeles)	Two Los Angeles police officers were stopped at a red light in the Van Nuys neighborhood when the back window of their car shattered. They believe they were under fire, got out of their vehicle, and fired at the man they believed responsible, killing him. It was determined that Byrd had shattered their window by throwing a large beer bottle. No weapon was found.
2015-10-02	Jepsen, Phyllis (55)	White	Oregon (Aloha)	Washington County Sheriffs deputies were responding to a call about a suicidal woman. When they arrived they found Jepsen armed with a knife. In the confrontation they used both lethal and non-lethal weapons. Jepsen was struck by at least one bullet and killed.
2015-10-02	Pena, Christian (26)	Hispanic	California (Rialto)	Rialto Police officers responded to a report of domestic violence and encountered Pena whom they describe as combative. There was a struggle and the officers tased Pena. When he pulled a knife, an officer shot him in the chest and killed him.
2015-10-02	David Miguel Diaz (28)	Hispanic	Arizona (Sierra Vista)	
2015-10-02	Matthew Ray Dobbins (29)	White	Texas (Amarillo)	

== See also ==
- Death in custody § United States
- Henry A. Wallace Police Crime Public Database
- List of cases of police brutality
- List of countries with annual rates and counts for killings by law enforcement officers
- List of law enforcement officers killed in the line of duty in the United States
- List of law enforcement officers convicted for an on-duty killing in the United States
- List of shootings by US immigration agents
- List of police reforms related to the George Floyd protests
- List of unarmed African Americans killed by law enforcement officers in the United States
- Lists of killings by law enforcement officers
- Police brutality in the United States
- Police misconduct § United States
- Police riot § United States
- Police use of deadly force in the United States
