= Power Engineering (magazine) =

Monthly magazine

- Managing Editor: Russell Ray
- Categories: Science
- Frequency: Monthly
- Publisher: Clarion Events
- Founded: 1896
- Country: United States
- Based in: Tulsa, Oklahoma
- Language: English
- Website: www.power-eng.com
- ISSN: 0032-5961

Power Engineering is a monthly magazine dedicated to professionals in the field of power engineering and power generation. Articles are focused on new developments in power plant design, construction and operation in North America.

Power Engineering was published by PennWell Corporation, the largest U.S. publisher of electric power industry books, directories, maps and conferences. In 2018, PennWell was acquired by Clarion Events, a British company owned by The Blackstone Group.

Power Engineering International, also published by PennWell, covers Europe, Asia-Pacific, the Middle East and the rest of the world.
