= The Martin Group =

- Industry: Marketing agency
- Founded: 2001; 25 years ago
- Founder: Tod D. Martin
- Headquarters: Buffalo, New York, United States
- Number of employees: 95 (2021)
- Website: martingroup.co

The Martin Group is an integrated marketing communications agency headquartered in Buffalo, New York, with offices in Rochester, New York, and Albany, New York. The agency also has a remote workforce in several other cities, and is currently focused on enterprise growth, after first being founded by Tod D. Martin in 2001. The Buffalo News reported in February 2021 that The Martin Group has a workforce of more than 90 associates, annual billings totaling $17 million and a client roster that includes Wegmans, New Era Cap, Puma, Under Armour, M&T Bank, Independent Health, Kaleida Health, and the Ralph C. Wilson Jr. Foundation.

== History ==
In June 2014, the firm opened an office outside of Rochester in Victor, New York, to support one of its largest clients, as well as other regional accounts. Also in June 2014, The Martin Group acquired a smaller PR firm, Travers Collins & Company, where the founder of The Martin Group previously worked. In 2017, The Martin Group moved into a new headquarters, a historic building in downtown Buffalo’s Theatre District renovated for $2.3 million. The Martin Group won a Public Relations Society of America Silver Anvil award in 2018 for its work on a campaign covering the move and renaming of the John R. Oishei Children's Hospital. The Martin Group has won the Best of Show award with the American Advertising Federation Western New York ADDY Awards in 2023 and 2024.

In 2020, Hearst Newspapers, part of Hearst Corp.'s global media conglomerate, purchased a strategic equity stake in the Martin Group. In addition, Chief Operating Officer Lisa Strock and Chief Business Officer Matt Davison became equity partners in the agency, along with Martin. Nearly three years after establishing a presence in the Capital Region, The Martin Group acquired Gramercy Communications, an Albany-based public affairs and public relations agency, in February 2021.

In August 2023, The Martin Group relocated its Capital Region headquarters from Colonie to the Troy Innovation Garage to support staff growth and client expansion.
