= Tests of Engineering Aptitude, Mathematics, and Science =

Engineering competition

Tests of Engineering Aptitude, Mathematics, and Science (TEAMS) is an annual competition originally organized by the Junior Engineering Technical Society (JETS). TEAMS is an annual theme-based competition for students in grades 9–12, aimed at giving them the opportunity to discover engineering and how they can make a difference in the world.

== History ==
The TEAMS competition was created in 1975 at the University of Illinois for the state of Illinois. In 1978, JETS expanded TEAMS to become a national competition. In 1993, the TEAMS test changed format into a format very similar to the one used today. Since 2008, the TEAMS competitions have had a theme.

2008	2009	2010	2011
Athletic Events	Theme Parks	Water, Water Everywhere	Smarter Energy. Cleaner Planet.

The 2010 theme for the TEAMS competition delved in the problems engineers face while providing access to clean water. It was named for Samuel Taylor Coleridge's famous quote, "Water, water, everywhere, / Nor any drop to drink."

== Format ==
This competition is divided in two parts. The first part, lasting an hour and a half, has 80 multiple choice questions. Each group of ten questions is related to a specific problem relating to the overall theme. The second part consists of eight open-ended tasks that are aimed at encouraging teamwork to develop the best answer. This competition is taken part by each participating school in a regional competition; the scores at that date determine the standings in the regional, state, and national level. There are six school divisions, one home division, one group division and two levels (9th/10th grade level & 11th/12th grade level).

Each team consists of eight high school students. A school may submit multiple teams. Thousands of teams participate in this competition each year.
