= C. J. Jones =

American gridiron football player (born 1980)

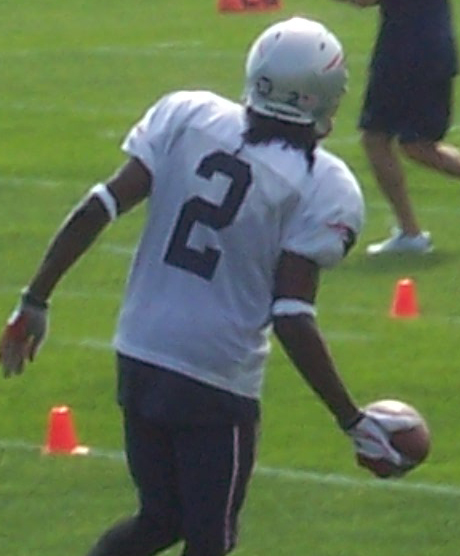
- Jones with the New England Patriots in 2008

No. 85, 16, 19, 2
- Position: Wide receiver

Personal information
- Born: September 20, 1980 (age 46); Boynton Beach, Florida, U.S.
- Listed height: 6 ft 6 in (1.98 m)
- Listed weight: 195 lb (88 kg)

Career information
- College: Iowa
- NFL draft: 2003: undrafted

Career history
- Cleveland Browns (2003–2004); Cologne Centurions (2005); Montreal Alouettes (2005); Berlin Thunder (2006); Seattle Seahawks (2006)*; New England Patriots (2007–2008); Kansas City Chiefs (2009)*; Denver Broncos (2009)*; Florida Tuskers (2010)
- * Offseason or practice squad member only

Clinton "C. J." Jones (born September 20, 1980) is an American former professional football wide receiver. He was signed by the Cleveland Browns as an undrafted free agent in 2003. He played college football at Iowa. Jones was also a member of the Cologne Centurions, Montreal Alouettes, Berlin Thunder, Seattle Seahawks, New England Patriots, Kansas City Chiefs, Denver Broncos, and Florida Tuskers. He is the older brother of Corey Jones, who gained national attention after being illegally shot and killed by Palm Beach Gardens police on October 18, 2015.

== Professional career ==
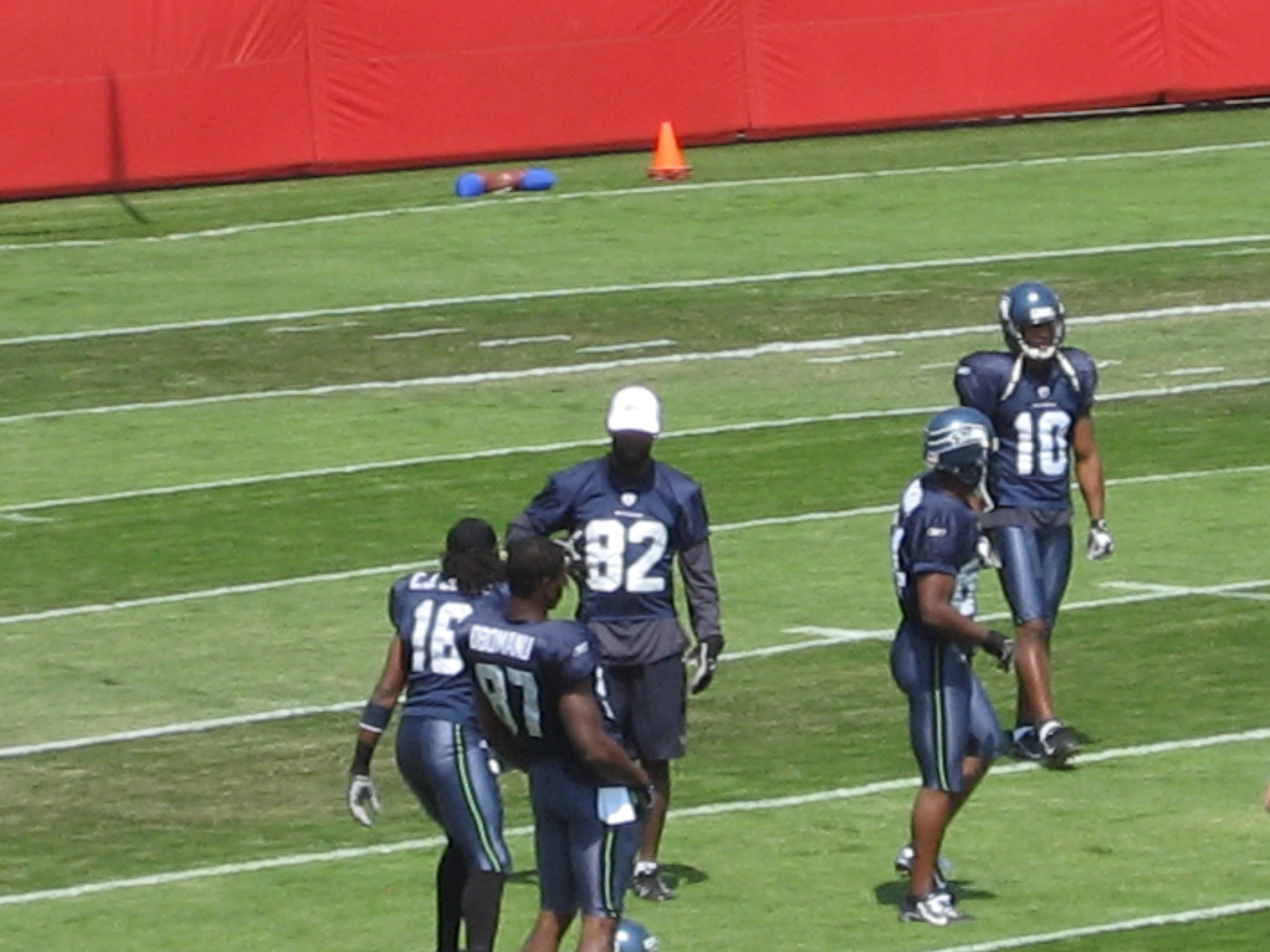
Jones (far left) in 2006.

=== Seattle Seahawks ===
Before the 2006 season, Jones was also a member of the Seattle Seahawks but was released.

=== New England Patriots ===
In 2007, he signed with the Patriots and was on the practice squad for the whole season. In 2008, he made the team's final cut but was released after the Patriots signed wide receiver Maurice Price.

=== Kansas City Chiefs ===
Jones was signed by the Kansas City Chiefs on March 5, 2009. He was waived on June 19, 2009.

=== Denver Broncos ===
Jones was claimed off waivers by the Denver Broncos on June 24, 2009. He was released on September 1.
