= K. J. Wright =

American football player (born 1989)

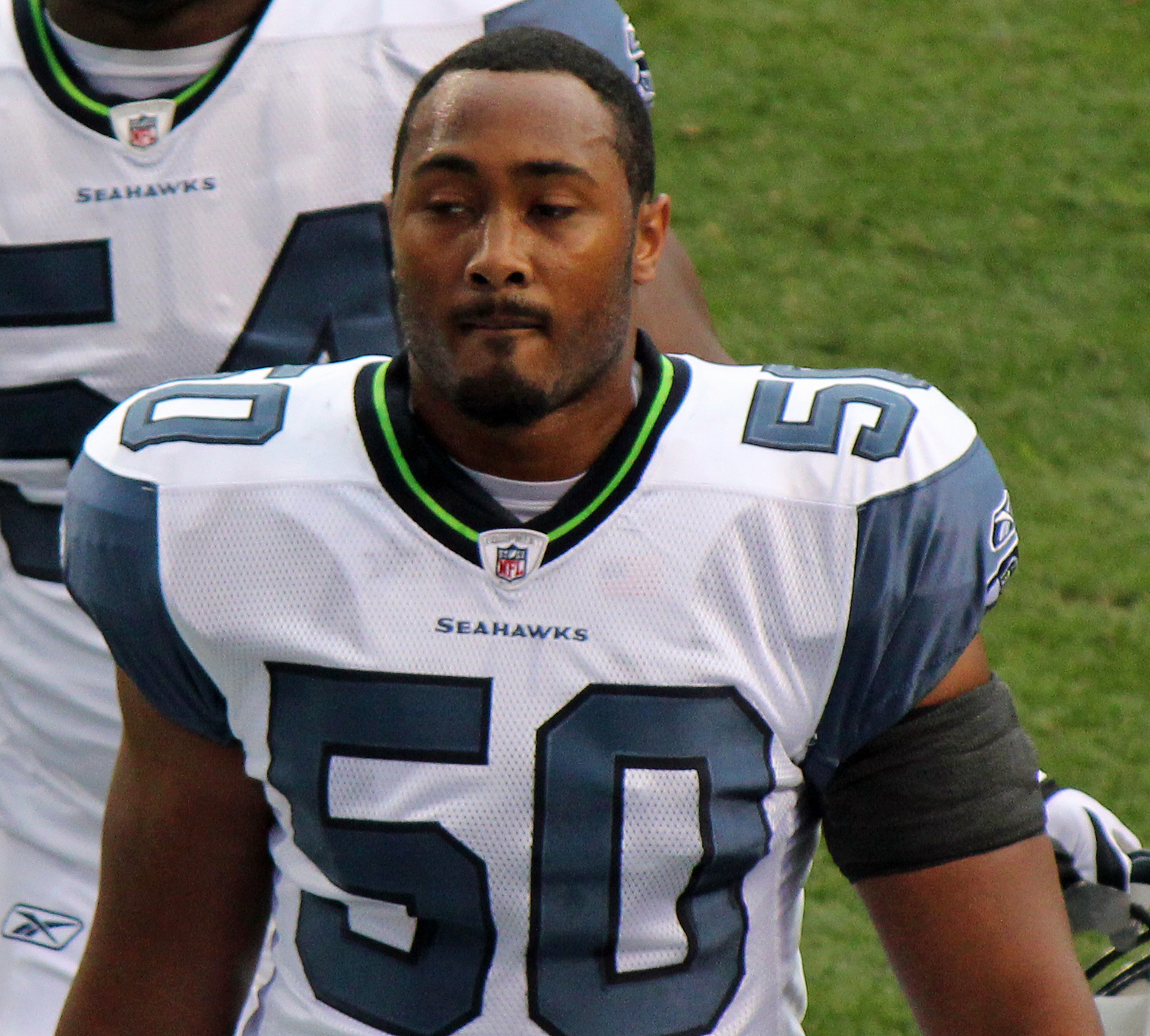
- Wright with the Seattle Seahawks in 2011

San Francisco 49ers
- Title: Linebackers coach

Personal information
- Born: July 23, 1989 (age 37); Memphis, Tennessee, U.S.
- Listed height: 6 ft 4 in (1.93 m)
- Listed weight: 246 lb (112 kg)

Career information
- Position: Linebacker (No. 50, 34)
- High school: Olive Branch (Olive Branch, Mississippi)
- College: Mississippi State (2007–2010)
- NFL draft: 2011: 4th round, 99th overall pick

Career history

Playing
- Seattle Seahawks (2011–2020); Las Vegas Raiders (2021)

Coaching
- San Francisco 49ers (2024–present) Linebackers Coach

Awards and highlights
- Super Bowl champion (XLVIII); Pro Bowl (2016); Seattle Seahawks Top 50 players

Career NFL statistics
- Total tackles: 992
- Sacks: 13.5
- Interceptions: 6
- Forced fumbles: 11
- Fumble recoveries: 9
- Pass deflections: 54
- Stats at Pro Football Reference

Kenneth Bernard Wright Jr. (born July 23, 1989) is an American former professional football player who was a linebacker for eleven seasons in the National Football League (NFL). He is currently the defense quality control coach for the San Francisco 49ers. He was selected by the Seattle Seahawks in the fourth round of the 2011 NFL draft. He played college football for the Mississippi State Bulldogs.

== Early life ==
Wright attended Olive Branch High School in Olive Branch, Mississippi, where he was a three-sport athlete in football, basketball and track. He was named first-team, all-state on the defensive line by The Clarion-Ledger. He recorded 91 total tackles during his senior season in which 48 of them were solo tackles. He was listed as the number 19 prospect in Mississippi following his senior season according to Rivals.com. He was awarded with his performance with top scholarship offers from Auburn, Arkansas, Ole Miss, and South Carolina. He committed to Mississippi State during his senior year of high school.

== College career ==
Wright played at Mississippi State University during his college career. He held onto the number 34 while playing for the Bulldogs and played the linebacker position. During his sophomore season, he was promoted as a starter on the defensive unit as an outside linebacker. He then began to start for the rest of his college career except for his senior year, when he did not start for two games due to formation changes. He still started ten out of twelve games during his senior year.

== Professional career ==
=== Pre-draft ===
On January 13, 2011, it was announced Wright had accepted his invitation to play in the 2011 Senior Bowl and was one of four Mississippi State players attending, including Derek Sherrod, Pernell McPhee and Chris White. On January 29, 2011, he played in the Under Armour's Senior Bowl and was part of Chan Gailey's South team that defeated the North 24–10. He attended the NFL Scouting Combine in Indianapolis, Indiana and completed all of the combine drills. On March 10, 2011, Wright attended Mississippi State's pro day and opted to perform all of the drills except the broad jump and bench press. He was able to beat his times in the 40-yard dash (4.71 seconds), 20-yard dash (2.69 seconds), and 10-yard dash (1.66 seconds) from the NFL Combine. At the conclusion of the pre-draft process, Wright was projected to be a third-round pick by NFL draft experts and scouts. He was ranked the eighth best outside linebacker prospect in the draft by NFLDraftScout.com.

Pre-draft measurables
Height	Weight	Arm length	Hand span	Wingspan	40-yard dash	10-yard split	20-yard split	20-yard shuttle	Three-cone drill	Vertical jump	Broad jump	Bench press	Wonderlic
6 ft 3 3/8 in (1.91 m)	246 lb (112 kg)	34 7/8 in (0.89 m)	9 in (0.23 m)	6 ft 8 3/4 in (2.05 m)	4.71 s	1.66 s	2.69 s	4.35 s	7.21 s	34.0 in (0.86 m)	10 ft 0 in (3.05 m)	20 reps	20
All values from NFL Combine/Mississippi State's Pro Day

=== Seattle Seahawks ===
==== 2011 ====
The Seattle Seahawks selected Wright in the fourth round (99th overall) of the 2011 NFL draft. He was the 13th linebacker selected. General manager John Schneider and head coach Pete Carroll stated they liked the thought of Wright as a strong side linebacker with the possibility of playing rush linebacker.

On July 29, 2011, the Seahawks signed Wright to a four-year, $2.52 million contract that included a signing bonus of $486,000.

Wright performed well and impressed coaches throughout training camp and began taking reps at middle linebacker after the unexpected release of Lofa Tatupu in July. Linebackers coach Ken Norton stated that he thought Wright was better suited for middle linebacker due to his instincts and length. He also felt that learning the position would speed up Wright's development since he would have to learn all of the defensive calls. Head coach Carroll named Wright the backup middle linebacker to veteran David Hawthorne to begin the 2011 regular season.

He made his professional regular season debut and first career start in the Seahawks' season-opener at the San Francisco 49ers and recorded five combined tackles during the 33–17 loss. Wright earned the start at middle linebacker in place of Hawthorne, who was inactive due to a knee injury. On September 22, 2011, Wright began practicing at weak side linebacker with the first team defense in practice. It was suspected he had supplanted Aaron Curry as the starting strong side linebacker after Curry had a dismal performance where he dropped a crucial interception in the second quarter of the Seahawks' 24–0 loss to the Pittsburgh Steelers in Week 2. The next day, defensive coordinator Gus Bradley announced there would be a competition between Wright and Curry for the job as the starting strong side linebacker. On October 2, 2011, Wright earned his first career start at strong side linebacker after Matt McCoy started the previous week. He recorded two solo tackles in the 30–28 loss to the Atlanta Falcons. Although he earned the start, he shared playing time with Curry, with Curry receiving more snaps. The following day, head coach Carroll stated that the competition for the starting strong side linebacker job between both players remained open.

In Week 5, Wright made his second consecutive start at outside linebacker and made four combined tackles in a 36–25 victory at the New York Giants. On October 13, the Seahawks traded Curry to the Oakland Raiders, effectively making Wright the de facto starting strong side linebacker for the remainder of the season. On December 1, he collected five solo tackles and made his first career sack, on Philadelphia Eagles' quarterback Vince Young during a 31–14 victory. The following game, he recorded a season-high eight combined tackles and sacked Sam Bradford during a 30–13 win over the St. Louis Rams. On December 18, Wright again achieved eight combined tackles during a 38–14 victory at the Chicago Bears. He finished his rookie season with 65 combined tackles (50 solo), three pass deflections, and two sacks in 16 games and 12 starts.

==== 2012 ====
Wright returned as the starting strong side linebacker in 2012, alongside Leroy Hill and starting rookie middle linebacker Bobby Wagner. He took over play-calling duties from Hawthorne, who departed in free agency. He started the Seahawks' season opener against the Arizona Cardinals and recorded nine combined tackles and forced the first fumble of his career in a 20–16 loss. He forced running back Ryan Williams to fumble on the Cardinals' first drive and it was recovered by Seahawks' defensive lineman Brandon Mebane. On September 24, Wright had a season-high 11 combined tackles in a 14–12 victory over the Green Bay Packers. In Week 9, Wright left during the first quarter of a 30–20 win over the Minnesota Vikings after suffering a concussion. He was listed as inactive and remained in concussion protocol the following game. In Week 15, he made three combined tackles, deflected a pass, and intercepted quarterback Ryan Fitzpatrick as the Seahawks routed the Buffalo Bills 50–17. The next week, he collected seven combined tackles and sacked Alex Smith in a 42–13 defeat of the San Francisco 49ers. He finished the 2012 season with 98 combined tackles (68 solo), five pass deflections, a sack, an interception, and a fumble recovery in 15 games and 15 starts. He played in 92% of the Seahawks' defensive snaps.

The Seahawks finished second in the NFC West with an 11–5 record and received a wildcard spot. On January 6, 2013, Wright started his first career playoff game and recorded eight combined tackles and a pass deflection during a 24–14 NFC Wildcard victory at the Washington Redskins. They were eliminated from the playoffs the following week, losing 30–28 at the Atlanta Falcons in the NFC Divisional round.

==== 2013 (Super Bowl XLVIII) ====
Head coach Carroll named Wagner, Wright, and Malcolm Smith the starting linebackers to begin the regular season. On September 15, Wright made six combined tackles, defended a pass, and sacked Colin Kaepernick, as the Seahawks routed the San Francisco 49ers 45–17. In Week 9, he collected a season-high 11 combined tackles during a 27–24 victory against the Tampa Bay Buccaneers. On December 8, Wright made three combined tackles during a 19–17 loss at the San Francisco 49ers before leaving with a foot injury. It was later discovered to be a broken foot, and Wright missed the remainder of the regular season. Wright finished the 2013 season with 80 combined tackles (46 solo), four pass deflections, and 1.5 sacks in 13 games and 13 starts. The Seahawks' defense allowed the fewest points during the season, under defensive coordinator Dan Quinn. At the time of his injury, Wright's overall grade from Pro Football Focus ranked him tenth among all outside linebackers. Wright played in 86% of Seattle's defensive snaps in 2013.

The Seahawks finished atop the NFC West with a 13–3 record. After defeating the New Orleans Saints, the Seahawks went on to face the San Francisco 49ers in the NFC Championship with Wright making his return from injury. He recorded two combined tackles as the Seahawks won 23–17. On February 2, 2014, Wright started in Super Bowl XLVIII and made seven combined tackles as they routed the Denver Broncos 43–8.

==== 2014 (Super Bowl XLIX) ====
On December 18, 2014, the Seahawks signed Wright to a four-year, $27 million extension that included $10.18 million guaranteed and a signing bonus of $5 million. He became the second-highest-paid outside linebacker behind only Lance Briggs, and the contract had the largest total value of any outside linebacker's in the league.

Wright entered training camp slated as the starting weak side linebacker after defensive end Bruce Irvin transitioned to strong side linebacker under defensive coordinator Dan Quinn. Head coach Carroll named Wright the starting weak side linebacker to start the regular season, opposite Mike Morgan, who was named the starting strong side linebacker while Irvin recuperated from hip surgery. On November 2, 2014, Wright recorded a season-high 13 combined tackles, a pass deflection, and a forced fumble during a 30–24 victory against the Oakland Raiders. In Week 13, he made seven combined tackles and recorded his first sack on the season on San Francisco 49ers' quarterback Colin Kaepernick in their 19–3 victory. Wright finished the 2014 season with 107 combined tackles (73 solo), four pass deflections, two sacks, and two forced fumbles in 16 games and 16 starts. It marked his first season with over 100 tackles and his first season starting all 16 games.

The Seahawks finished atop the NFC West with a 12–4 record, marking their second consecutive season in first place. They went on to defeat the Carolina Panthers 31–17 and then defeated the Green Bay Packers 28–22 to win the NFC Championship. On February 1, 2015, Wright recorded 11 combined tackles as the New England Patriots defeated the Seahawks 28–24 to win Super Bowl XLIX.

==== 2015 ====
Wright, Wagner, and Irvin returned to their starting roles in 2015 under new defensive coordinator Kris Richard. On September 20, 2015, Wright recorded nine combined tackles and forced a fumble during a 27–17 loss at the Green Bay Packers. Wright was ejected from the game after getting into a physical altercation with Packers' tight end Richard Rodgers in the third quarter. Wright shoved Rodgers to the ground and attempted to rip his helmet off and was flagged for unnecessary roughness and immediately ejected from the game. On September 25, 2015, the NFL fined Wright $10,000 for the incident.

On October 5, 2015, Wright was involved in a controversial play during a 13–10 win against the Detroit Lions. With less than two minutes remaining in the fourth quarter, Lions' wide receiver Calvin Johnson fumbled the ball at the one-yard line while attempting to dive in the end zone. Wright batted the ball out of the back of the endzone, resulting in a touchback and possession for the Seahawks. The play was scrutinized after ESPN officiating analyst Gerry Austin pointed out the error and explained that the referees failed to penalize Wright for illegal batting that would've given the Lions possession at the one-yard line. Wright admitted the bat was intentional, but was unaware of the penalty. The NFL vice-president of officiating Dean Blandino admitted fault on behalf of the referees and confirmed illegal batting, and that Wright should have been penalized. In Week 6, Wright recorded a season-high 12 combined tackles in the Seahawks' 27–23 loss to the Carolina Panthers.

Through the first half of the 2015 season, Wright enjoyed the most productive stretch of his career, with 58 total tackles (34 solo), one tackle for loss, a forced fumble, a fumble recovery, and one pass defensed. Over these eight games, Pro Football Focus graded him as the second best linebacker in the league and named him to their All-Pro second-team. He finished the 2015 season with 115 combined tackles (71 solo), three pass deflections, and a sack in 16 games and 16 starts. He started all 16 games and had over 100 tackles for the second consecutive season. Pro Football Focus ranked Wright 53rd among all players in 2015. The Seahawks received a playoff berth after finishing second in the NFC West with a 10–6 record. After defeating the Minnesota Vikings, they went on to play the Carolina Panthers in the NFC Divisional round. Wright recorded 14 combined tackles as the Seahawks lost 31–24.

==== 2016 ====
During the offseason, strong side linebacker Bruce Irvin departed in free agency, while Wagner and Wright returned to their respective positions with Mike Morgan taking over the vacant strong side linebacker role. Wright started the Seahawks' season-opener against the Miami Dolphins and recorded a season-high 11 combined tackles and sacked quarterback Ryan Tannehill during a 12–10 victory. On October 23, 2016, he recorded a season-high ten solo tackles in the Seahawks' 6–6 tie with the Arizona Cardinals. He finished the 2016 season with a career-high 126 combined tackles (72 solo), five pass deflections, and a career-high four sacks in 16 games and 16 starts.

The Seahawks finished 10–5–1 and first in the NFC West. On January 14, 2017, Wright recorded ten combined tackles in a 36–20 loss at the Atlanta Falcons. Wright was selected as a replacement for Ryan Kerrigan for the 2017 Pro Bowl and was named to Pro Football Focus All-Pro second-team for the second straight year. It was Wright's first Pro Bowl appearance. He finished the season with a career-high 126 tackles and four sacks.

==== 2017 ====
Wright returned as the starting right outside linebacker, opposite Terence Garvin. On October 29, 2017, Wright recorded a season-high 15 combined tackles in the Seahawks' 41–38 victory against the Houston Texans. He missed a Week 15 matchup against the Los Angeles Rams due to a back injury. The injury ended his 53-game streak of starts. In Week 16, he made six combined tackles, deflected two passes, and intercepted a pass by Dak Prescott in a 21–12 victory at the Dallas Cowboys. It was his first interception since 2012. He finished the season with 108 combined tackles (71 solo), six pass deflections, and an interception in 15 games and 15 starts. The Seahawks finished second in their division with a 9–7 record and did not qualify for the playoffs. It marked Wright's first time missing the playoffs with the Seahawks since his rookie season in 2011. Wright received an overall grade of 82.1 From Pro Football Focus, ranking him 19th among all linebackers in 2017.

==== 2018 ====
Wright suffered a knee injury in the final preseason game against the Minnesota Vikings and underwent arthroscopic knee surgery. As a result of the procedure, he missed the first six games of the season. Wright returned in week 8 against the Detroit Lions after the Seahawks' bye week, and recorded 5 solo tackles and a pass deflection in the 28–14 win. The following week against the Los Angeles Chargers, Wright recorded 7 combined tackles and another pass deflection in the 25–17 loss. Wright recorded 2 combined tackles against the Los Angeles Rams in week 10 but was forced to leave the game early in the second half after aggravating his knee injury. He was inactive for the following week's game against the Green Bay Packers.

==== 2019 ====
On March 14, 2019, Wright signed a two-year, $15.5 million contract extension with the Seahawks. In week 3 against the New Orleans Saints, Wright recorded 13 tackles in the 33–27 loss. In week 6 against the Cleveland Browns, Wright recorded an interception off Baker Mayfield in the 32–28 win. In week 15 against the Carolina Panthers, Wright intercepted 2 passes thrown by Kyle Allen during the 30–24 win. Wright finished the season 11th in total tackles with 132.

==== 2020 ====
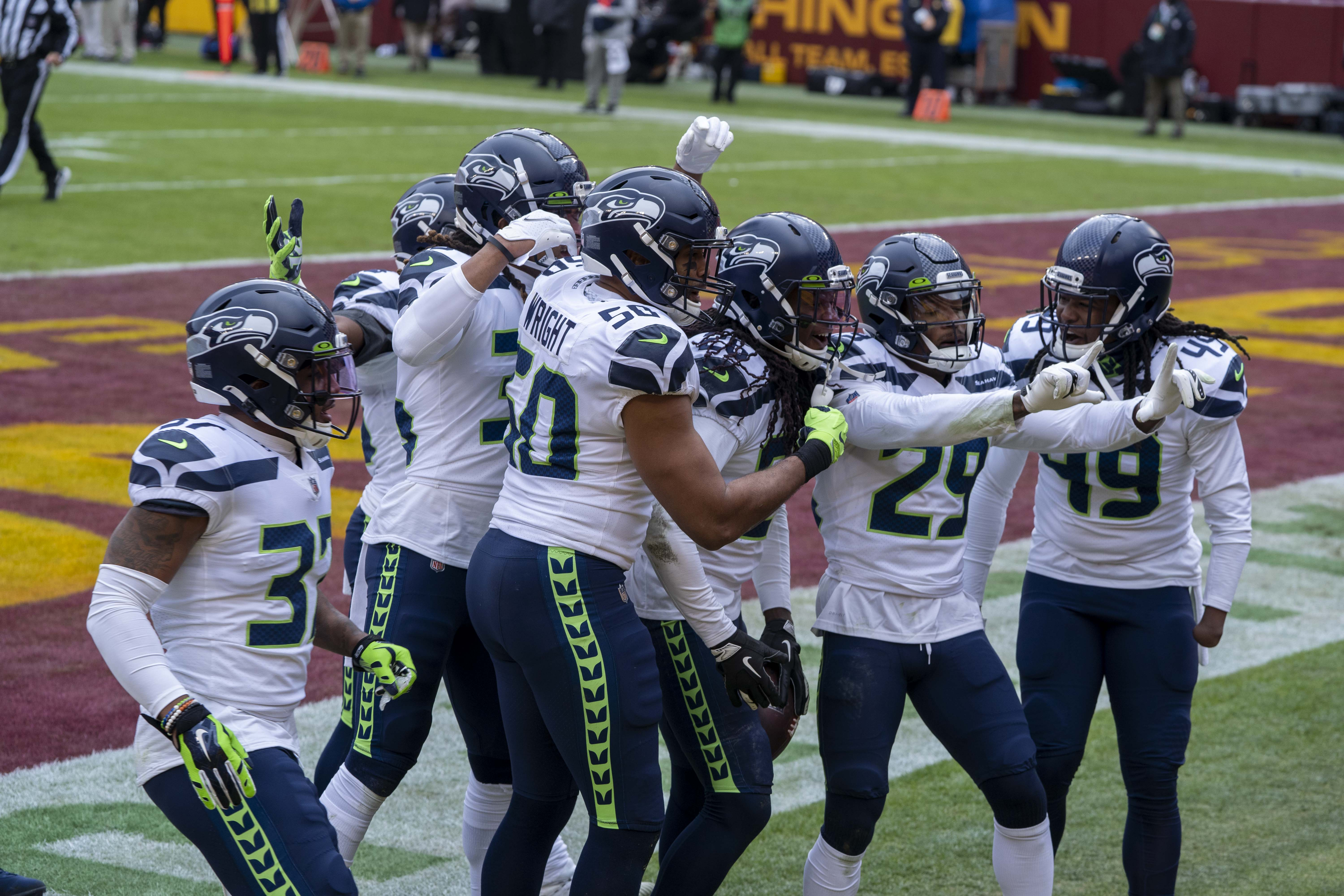
Wright (#50) playing for the Seahawks in 2020.

In Week 5 against the Minnesota Vikings on Sunday Night Football, Wright intercepted a pass thrown by Kirk Cousins and recovered a fumble lost by Cousins during the 27–26 win. In Week 9 against the Buffalo Bills, Wright recorded his first sack of the season on Josh Allen during the 44–34 loss. This was also Wright's first sack since the 2016 season.

Wright had one of his most productive seasons with the Seahawks after switching to the strongside linebacker position due to an injury to Bruce Irvin and the drafting of new weakside linebacker Jordyn Brooks. He earned his first placement on the NFL Top 100 list, placing 67th.

=== Las Vegas Raiders ===
On September 6, 2021, Wright signed a one-year contract with the Las Vegas Raiders reuniting him with his former Seahawks defensive coordinator Gus Bradley.

=== Retirement ===
On July 27, 2022, Wright signed a one-day contract to officially retire as a member of the Seahawks.

== Coaching career ==
On March 4, 2024, Wright announced on social media that he had been hired as the assistant linebackers coach for the San Francisco 49ers. However, on May 24, his title was changed to defensive quality control coach. On April 9, 2026, Wright was announced as the team's new linebackers coach, following a role change for the incumbent Johnny Holland.

== Career statistics ==
=== NFL ===
Legend
	Won the Super Bowl
**Bold**	Career high

Year	Team	Games		Tackles				Fumbles				Interceptions			
Year	Team	GP	GS	Cmb	Solo	Ast	Sck	FF	FR	Yds	TD	Int	Yds	TD	PD
2011	SEA	16	12	65	50	15	2.0	1	1	**30**	0	0	0	0	3
2012	SEA	15	15	98	68	30	1.0	1	0	0	0	1	**24**	0	5
2013	SEA	13	13	80	46	34	1.5	0	1	0	0	0	0	0	4
2014	SEA	16	**16**	107	**73**	34	2.0	3	1	0	0	0	0	0	4
2015	SEA	16	**16**	116	71	45	1.0	**4**	**2**	4	0	0	0	0	3
2016	SEA	16	**16**	126	72	54	**4.0**	1	1	0	0	0	0	0	5
2017	SEA	15	15	108	71	37	0.0	0	1	0	0	1	1	0	6
2018	SEA	5	5	23	15	8	0.0	0	0	0	0	0	0	0	3
2019	SEA	16	**16**	**132**	67	**65**	0.0	0	0	0	0	**3**	10	0	**11**
2020	SEA	16	**16**	86	60	26	2.0	1	2	0	0	1	7	0	10
2021	LV	**17**	8	51	25	26	0.0	0	0	0	0	0	0	0	0
Career		161	148	992	618	374	13.5	11	9	34	0	6	42	0	54

=== College ===
Season	Games		Defense				
Season	GP	GS	Cmb	Sck	PD	FF	QBH
2007	10	0	7	4.0	0	0	0
2008	12	12	72	4.0	3	1	3
2009	12	10	81	2.0	2	1	4
2010	13	13	98	4.0	9	1	4
Career	47	35	258	14.0	14	3	11

== Personal life ==
In 2015, Wright proposed to his now-wife Nathalie on a Boeing factory tour that they were taking with her father. They married on May 27, 2017, in Seattle. The couple has two sons. The Wrights were featured in the December 11, 2019 House Hunters episode "Big Ballin' in Seattle.

Since joining the San Francisco 49ers' staff in 2024, Wright and his family have resided in Pacifica, California.
