= Malcolm Smith (American football) =

American football player (born 1989)

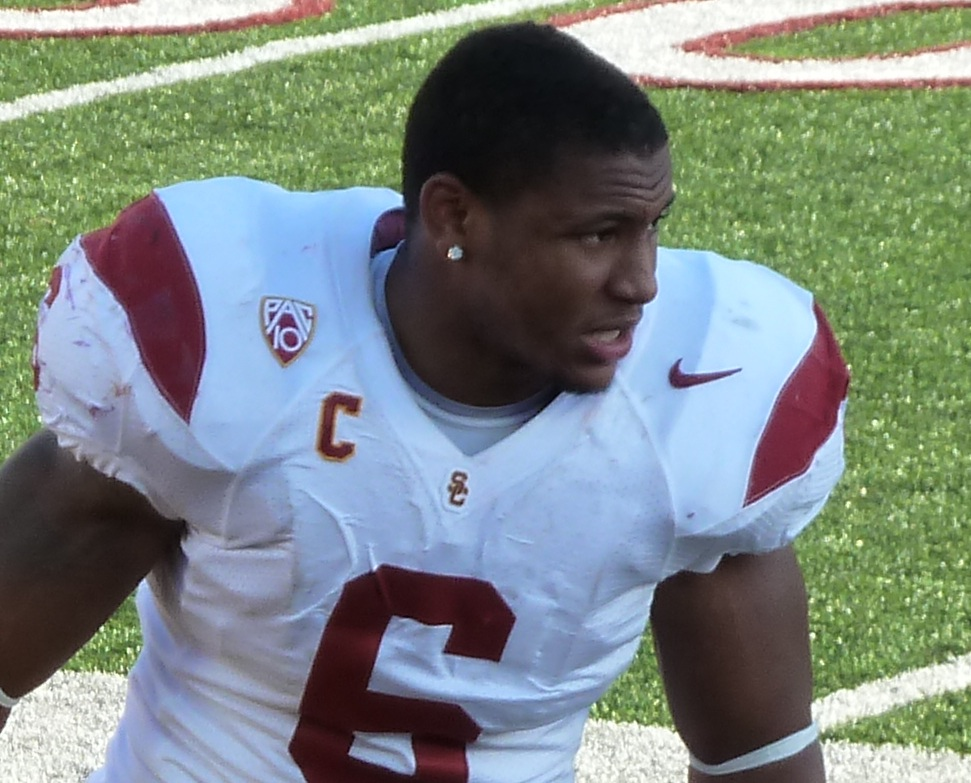
- Smith with the USC Trojans in 2010

No. 6, 53, 51, 43, 56
- Position: Linebacker

Personal information
- Born: July 5, 1989 (age 37); Woodland Hills, California, U.S.
- Listed height: 6 ft 0 in (1.83 m)
- Listed weight: 225 lb (102 kg)

Career information
- High school: William Howard Taft (Woodland Hills)
- College: USC (2007–2010)
- NFL draft: 2011: 7th round, 242nd overall pick

Career history
- Seattle Seahawks (2011–2014); Oakland Raiders (2015–2016); San Francisco 49ers (2017–2018); Jacksonville Jaguars (2019); Dallas Cowboys (2019); Cleveland Browns (2020–2021)

Awards and highlights
- Super Bowl champion (XLVIII); Super Bowl MVP (XLVIII)

Career NFL statistics
- Total tackles: 518
- Sacks: 7.0
- Forced fumbles: 11
- Fumble recoveries: 3
- Pass deflections: 24
- Interceptions: 7
- Defensive touchdowns: 2
- Stats at Pro Football Reference

Malcolm Xavier Smith (born July 5, 1989) is an American former professional football player who was a linebacker in the National Football League (NFL). He played college football for the USC Trojans and was selected by the Seattle Seahawks in the seventh round of the 2011 NFL draft. Smith was named the Most Valuable Player of Super Bowl XLVIII in the Seahawks' victory over the Denver Broncos. He also played for the Oakland Raiders, San Francisco 49ers, Jacksonville Jaguars, Dallas Cowboys, and Cleveland Browns.

== Early life ==
Smith attended William Howard Taft Charter High School, where he was a letterman in football and track. In football, Smith was named to the Student Sports Sophomore All-American and Cal-Hi Sports All-State first-team as a sophomore when he had 800-plus yards of total offense and eight touchdowns, plus two interceptions, as Taft won the L.A. City title. As a junior in 2005, Smith made Cal-Hi Sports All-State Underclass first-team, All-L.A. City first-team and Los Angeles Daily News All-Area first-team while making 41 tackles, two sacks, and a fumble recovery, plus running for 639 yards on 73 carries (8.8 avg.) with 10 touchdowns and catching 27 passes for 411 yards (15.2 avg.) with seven scores as Taft was the L.A. City runner-up. As a senior in 2006, he had 31 tackles, 10 sacks, and four fumble recoveries at linebacker and ran for 919 yards on 118 carries with 15 touchdowns as a running back, despite missing the first half of the season with a leg injury.

Also a standout track athlete, Smith competed as a sprinter for the Taft High track & field team. He qualified for the Los Angeles City Section T&F Championships in the 100m and 200m dashes. He recorded a personal-best time of 10.8 seconds in the 100-meter dash as a junior, and got a PR of 22.39 seconds in the 200-meter dash as a senior. Smith also ran the 40-yard dash in 4.45 seconds.

Smith received scholarship offers for football from Notre Dame, California, Arizona, Michigan, and Penn State.

== College career ==
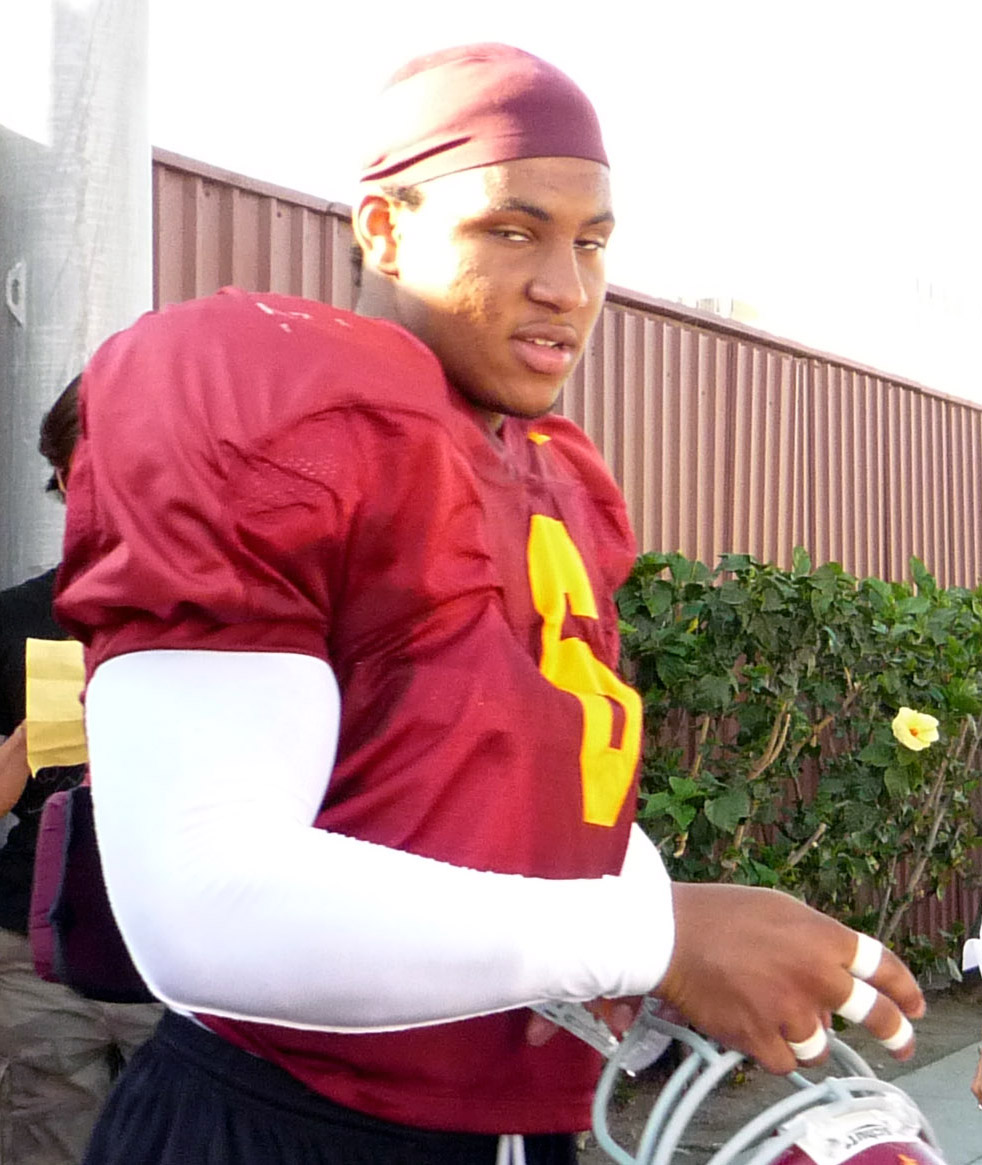
Smith in 2008

Smith enrolled at the University of Southern California (USC) in order to play college football for the USC Trojans football team. As a true freshman in 2007, Smith played in all 13 games as a backup linebacker and special teams player. He finished the year with six tackles and a forced fumble.

As a sophomore in 2008 he again spent time as a backup and on special teams. He finished the season with 18 tackles in 13 games. In the 2009 game against cross-town rival UCLA Bruins, Smith led the Trojan defense for a 28–7 win. Smith returned the first UCLA interception 62 yards for a touchdown in the first quarter. For his play, Smith was awarded the "Legend Nike Game Ball" for the National Defensive Player of the Week.

== Professional career ==
=== Pre-draft ===
Smith entered the 2011 NFL Draft, but did not receive an invitation to perform at the NFL Scouting Combine in Indianapolis, Indiana. On March 30, 2011, Smith attended USC's pro day and performed all of the combine and positional drills for team representatives and scouts. He also attended private meetings with the Seattle Seahawks and Chicago Bears. Smith was projected to be a sixth or seventh round pick by NFL draft experts and scouts. At the conclusion of the pre-draft process, Smith was ranked as the 29th best outside linebacker prospect in the draft by DraftScout.com and was ranked the 37th best outside linebacker by Scouts Inc.

Pre-draft measurables
Height	Weight	40-yard dash	10-yard split	20-yard split	20-yard shuttle	Three-cone drill	Vertical jump	Broad jump	Bench press
6 ft 0 1/4 in (1.84 m)	226 lb (103 kg)	4.44 s	1.61 s	2.63 s	4.54 s	7.08 s	39.0 in (0.99 m)	10 ft 5 in (3.18 m)	28 reps
All values from USC's Pro Day

=== Seattle Seahawks ===
==== 2011 season ====
Smith was selected by the Seattle Seahawks in the seventh round (242nd overall) of the 2011 NFL draft. He was the 30th linebacker drafted in 2011 and was reunited with head coach Pete Carroll. Carroll was Smith's head coach at USC from 2007 to 2009.

On July 28, 2011, the Seahawks signed Smith to a four-year, $2.08 million contract that includes a signing bonus of $45,900. Throughout training camp, Smith competed to be a backup outside linebacker against K. J. Wright, Matt McCoy, and David Vobora. Head coach Pete Carroll named Smith the backup weakside linebacker to start the regular season, behind Leroy Hill.

He made his professional regular season debut in the Seattle Seahawks' season-opener against the San Francisco 49ers and made two combined tackles in their 33–17 loss. Smith made his first career regular season tackle on Ted Ginn Jr. and stopped him for a ten-yard loss during a punt return in the second quarter. On November 13, 2011, Smith collected a season-high four solo tackles, forced a fumble, and made his first career sack during a 22–17 victory against the Baltimore Ravens. Smith forced a fumble by David Reed that was recovered by teammate Atari Bigby and led to a last second field goal before the end of the second quarter. He also sacked Ravens' quarterback Joe Flacco for an eight-yard loss in the fourth quarter. Smith was inactive for the last two games of the regular season (Weeks 16–17). He finished his rookie season in 2011 with 16 combined tackles (10 solo), a forced fumble, and a sack in 12 games and no starts.

==== 2012 season ====
During training camp, Smith competed for a roster spot as a backup outside linebacker against Jameson Konz, Allen Bradford, Heath Farwell, Mike Morgan, and Kyle Knox. Defensive coordinator Gus Bradley retained Smith as a backup outside linebacker, behind Leroy Hill and K. J. Wright, to begin the regular season. On December 2, 2012, Smith made his first career start and replaced Leroy Hill who was inactive due to an ankle injury. He finished the Seahawks' 23–17 win against the Chicago Bears with two solo tackles. In Week 16, he collected a season-high five combined tackles during a 42–13 victory against the San Francisco 49ers. Smith completed the 2012 season with 22 combined tackles (12 solo) and two pass deflections in 16 games and three starts. Smith was limited to 166 defensive snaps (16%), but played 258 snaps on special teams (60%). Smith earned an overall grade of 77.0 from Pro Football Focus in 2012.

The Seattle Seahawks finished second in the NFC West with an 11–5 record and earned a wildcard berth. On January 6, 2013, Smith appeared in his first career playoff game and recorded three solo tackles during the Seahawks' 24–14 win against the Washington Redskins in the NFC Wildcard Game. The following week, he made three solo tackles as the Seahawks lost the NFC Divisional Round 30–28 against the Atlanta Falcons.

==== 2013 season ====
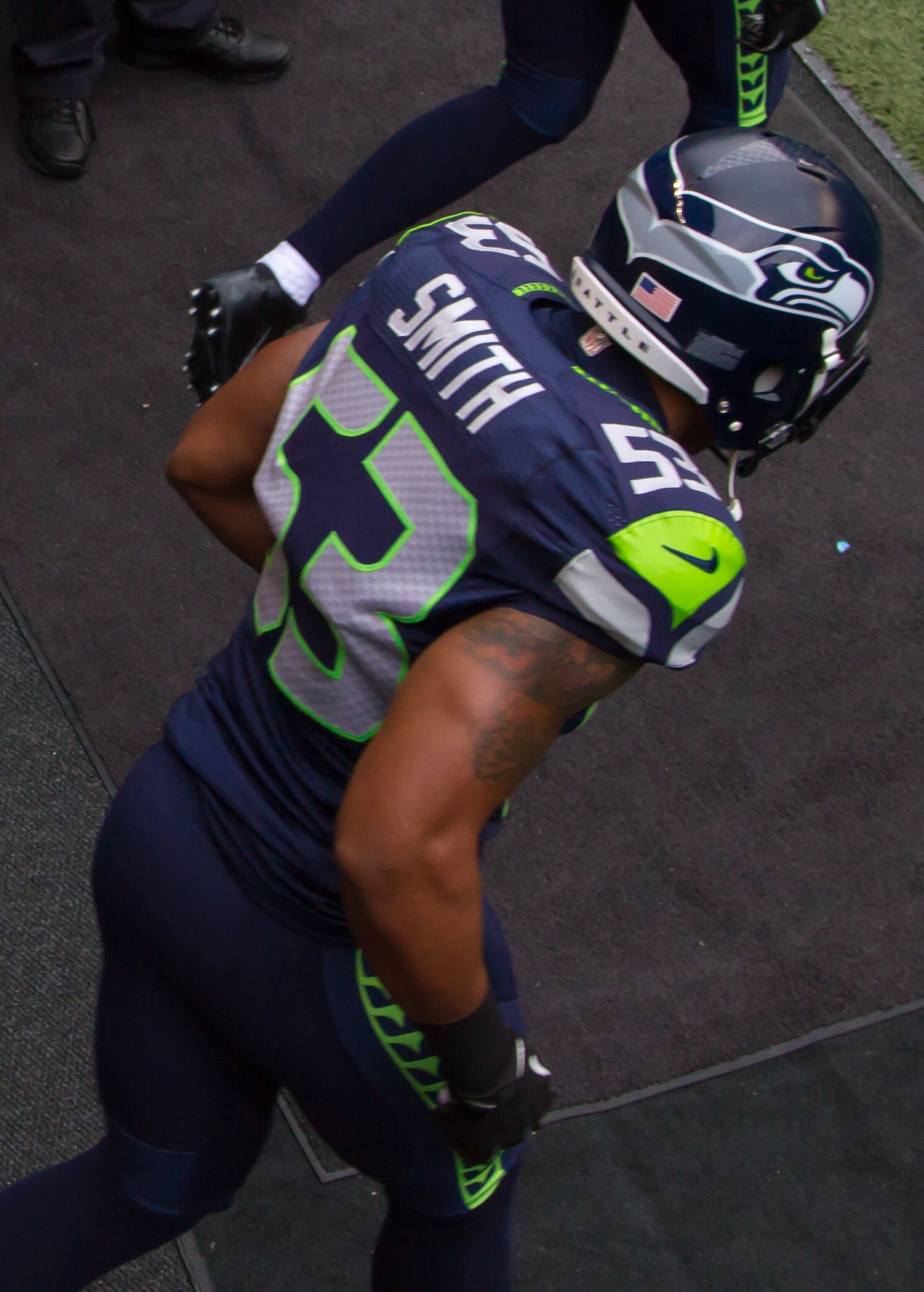
Smith with the Seahawks in 2013

Smith entered training camp slated as the starting weakside linebacker after the departure of Leroy Hill. Smith received competition from Korey Toomer, Bruce Irvin, Mike Morgan, and Allen Bradford. Head coach Pete Carroll officially named Smith and K. J. Wright the starting outside linebackers to start the season, along with middle linebacker Bobby Wagner.

Smith started in the Seattle Seahawks' season-opener against the Carolina Panthers and made two solo tackles in their 12–7 victory. Smith was sidelined for the Seahawks' Week 3 victory against the Jacksonville Jaguars due to a hamstring injury. On October 17, 2013, Smith collected a season-high nine combined tackles, a pass deflection, and a sack during a 34–22 win at the Arizona Cardinals in Week 7. The following week, Smith was surpassed on the depth chart by Bruce Irvin who was named the starting strongside linebacker in his place. Smith became the starting weakside linebacker in Week 15 after K. J. Wright sustained a fractured foot and was sidelined for the last three games of the regular season. On December 22, 2013, Smith recorded eight combined tackles, a pass deflection, and made his first career interception during a 17–10 loss to the Arizona Cardinals in Week 16. Smith intercepted a pass attempt by Cardinals' quarterback Carson Palmer, that was originally intended for running back Andre Ellington, and returned it for a 32-yard gain in the second quarter. In Week 17, Smith made five combined tackles, a pass deflection, and returned an interception for his first career touchdown in a 27–9 win against the St. Louis Rams. He intercepted a pass by Kellen Clemens, that was originally thrown to tight end Lance Kendricks, and returned it for a 37-yard touchdown in the first quarter. Smith finished the 2013 season with 54 combined tackles (34 solo), four passes defensed, a forced fumble, one sack, 2 interceptions, and a touchdown in 15 games and eight starts. Smith completed the season with 480 defensive snaps (46%) and 228 snaps on special teams (51%). Pro Football Focus gave Smith an overall grade of 83.0 in 2013. His grade ranked 16th among the 56th qualifying linebackers in the league.

The Seahawks won the NFC West with a 13–3 record and earned a first-round bye and home-field advantage throughout the playoffs. On January 11, 2014, Smith started in his first career playoff game and made nine combined tackles during a 23–15 victory against the New Orleans Saints in the NFC Divisional Round. On January 19, 2014, Smith made four combined tackles, a pass deflection, and made an interception to seal the Seahawks' 23–17 victory against the San Francisco 49ers in the NFC Championship Game. He intercepted a pass by quarterback Colin Kaepernick, that was intended for wide receiver Michael Crabtree. The pass was deflected by Richard Sherman and caught in the endzone for a touchback by Smith with the Seahawks up by six points with 30 seconds remaining.

On February 2, 2014, Smith recorded 10 combined tackles (six solo), deflected a pass, recovered a fumble, and returned an interception for a touchdown in the Seahawks' 43–8 victory over the Denver Broncos in Super Bowl XLVIII. Smith intercepted a pass by quarterback Peyton Manning, that was intended for running back Knowshon Moreno, and returned it for a 69-yard touchdown in the second quarter. Smith also recovered a fumble by wide receiver Demaryius Thomas in the third quarter after it was forced by teammate Byron Maxwell. His performance earned him the Super Bowl MVP award, making him the first defensive player to win the award since Dexter Jackson in Super Bowl XXXVII eleven years earlier. Smith is one of nine defensive players to win Super Bowl MVP honors.

==== 2014 season ====
Smith returned to a reserve role in 2014 after the return of K. J. Wright from injury. Defensive coordinator Dan Quinn opted to retain Bruce Irvin, K. J. Wright, and Bobby Wagner as the starting linebacker trio to start the regular season. In Week 7, Smith earned his first start of the season after Bobby Wagner was inactive for five games (Weeks 7–11) due to a turf toe injury. He finished the Seahawks' 28–26 loss at the St. Louis Rams with a season-high ten solo tackles. Smith was inactive for two games (Weeks 9–10) due to a groin injury. Smith finished the 2014 season with 38 combined tackles (28 solo), two forced fumbles, and a pass deflection in 14 games and five starts. Smith played predominantly on special teams and finished the season with 255 snaps (59%) on special teams and 273 snaps (27%) on defense. Pro Football Focus gave Smith an overall grade of 37.3, which marked the lowest grade of his career.

The Seahawks finished first in the NFC West with a 12–4 record and secured a playoff berth. On January 18, 2015, the Seahawks played the Green Bay Packers during the NFC Championship Game after defeating the Carolina Panthers 31–17 in the NFC Divisional Round. Smith made two combined tackles as Seattle defeated the Packers 28–22 in overtime. On February 1, 2015, Smith appeared in Super Bowl XLIX, but was held without a stat as the New England Patriots defeated the Seattle Seahawks 28–24.

=== Oakland Raiders ===
==== 2015 season ====
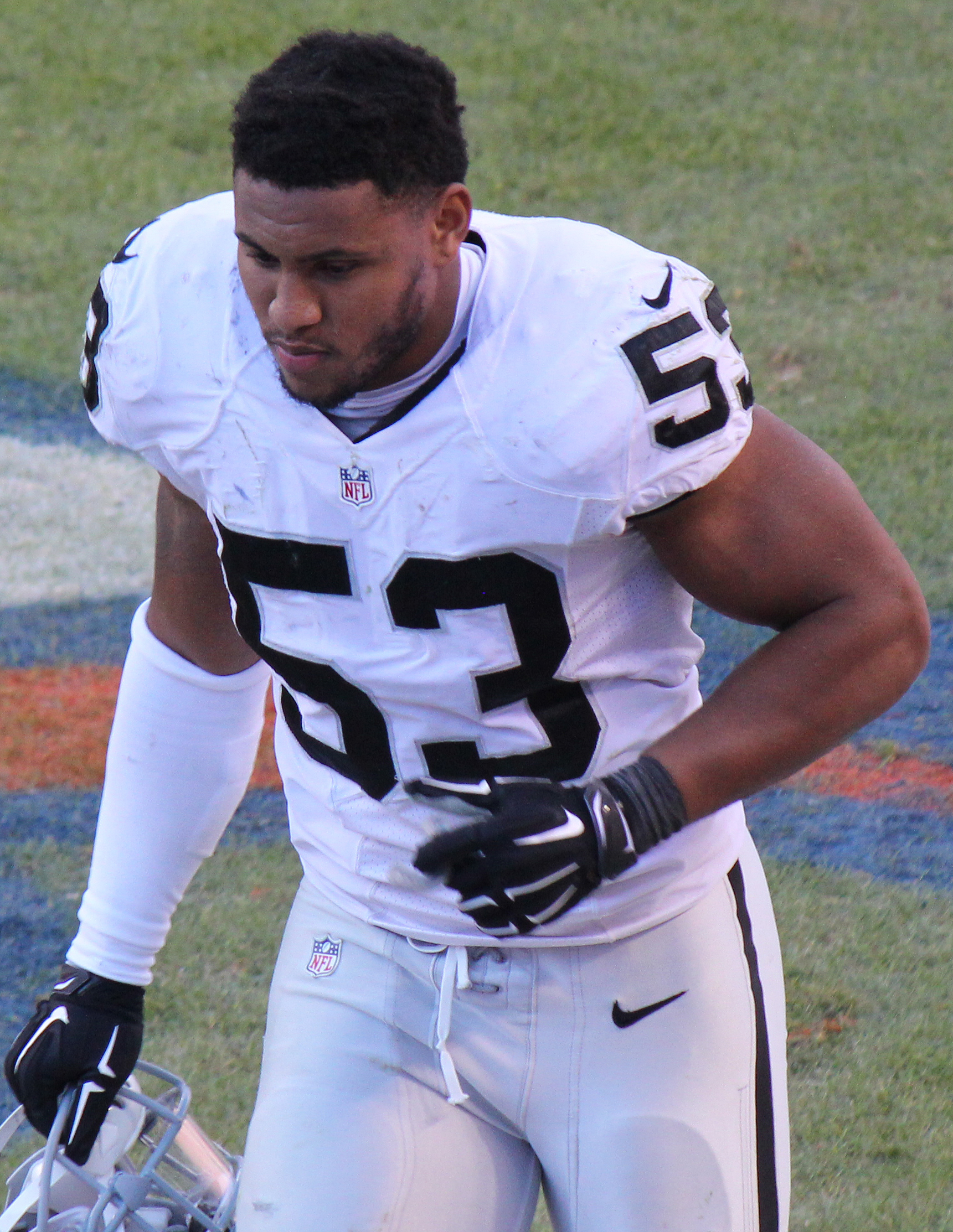
Smith in 2015

On March 10, 2015, the Oakland Raiders signed Smith to a two-year, $7 million contract with $3.75 million guaranteed and a signing bonus of $2 million. Smith reunited with defensive coordinator Ken Norton Jr., who was his linebackers coach from 2007–2009 at USC and from 2010–2014 with the Seattle Seahawks.

Head coach and fellow USC alumnus Jack Del Rio named Smith the starting weakside linebacker to start the regular season, along with Ray-Ray Armstrong and starting middle linebacker Curtis Lofton. On October 25, 2015, Smith had a season-high 11 solo tackles, two pass deflections, a sack, and an interception in the Raiders' 37–29 victory against the San Diego Chargers. Smith intercepted a pass by quarterback Philip Rivers, that was originally intended for wide receiver Stevie Johnson, and returned it for a 27-yard gain during the Chargers' opening drive. In Week 16, Smith made a career-high 14 combined tackles (11 solo) during a 23–20 victory over the San Diego Chargers.

Smith started all 16 games in 2015 and made a career-high 122 combined tackles (99 solo), six passes defensed, and four sacks. He also had two forced fumbles and an interception. Smith earned an overall grade of 44.3 from Pro Football Focus, which ranked 60th among all qualifying linebackers in 2015.

==== 2016 season ====
Head coach Jack Del Rio retained Smith as the starting weakside linebacker to start 2016, along with Bruce Irvin and middle linebacker Ben Heeney. Smith was inactive for the Raiders' Week 5 win against the San Diego Chargers due to a quadriceps injury. In Week 11, Smith collected ten combined tackles (nine solo), made a pass deflection, and intercepted a pass by Brock Osweiler during a 27–20 victory against the Houston Texans in Mexico City. On January 1, 2017, Smith recorded a season-high 12 combined tackles (nine solo) as the Raiders lost 24–6 against the Denver Broncos in Week 17. He finished the 2016 season with 103 combined tackles (86 solo), three pass deflections, two forced fumbles, and an interception in 15 games and 15 starts. Smith's performance suffered in 2016 and he earned an overall grade of 46.3 from Pro Football Focus. His grade ranked 68th among 88 qualifying linebackers during the season.

=== San Francisco 49ers ===
On March 9, 2017, the San Francisco 49ers signed Smith to a five-year, $26.5 million contract with $11.5 million guaranteed and a signing bonus of $7 million.

Smith entered training camp slated as the starting right outside linebacker, but saw competition from rookie first round pick Reuben Foster. On August 5, 2017, Smith injured his pectoral during a training camp practice held in Levi's Stadium. On August 7, 2017, the San Francisco 49ers officially placed Smith on injured reserve after an MRI determined he had suffered a torn pectoral muscle. He remained on injured reserve throughout the entire 2017 season.

In 2018, Smith appeared in 12 games, tallying 35 tackles (22 solo) and a pass deflection. On August 27, 2019, he was released.

=== Jacksonville Jaguars ===
On October 22, 2019, Smith was signed by the Jacksonville Jaguars. He appeared in two games as a backup before being released on November 5.

=== Dallas Cowboys ===
On December 17, 2019, Smith was signed as a free agent by the Dallas Cowboys to provide depth because of injuries for the last two games of the season. He reunited with his former defensive coordinator Kris Richard. Smith appeared in two games with one start, registering five tackles and a forced fumble.

=== Cleveland Browns ===
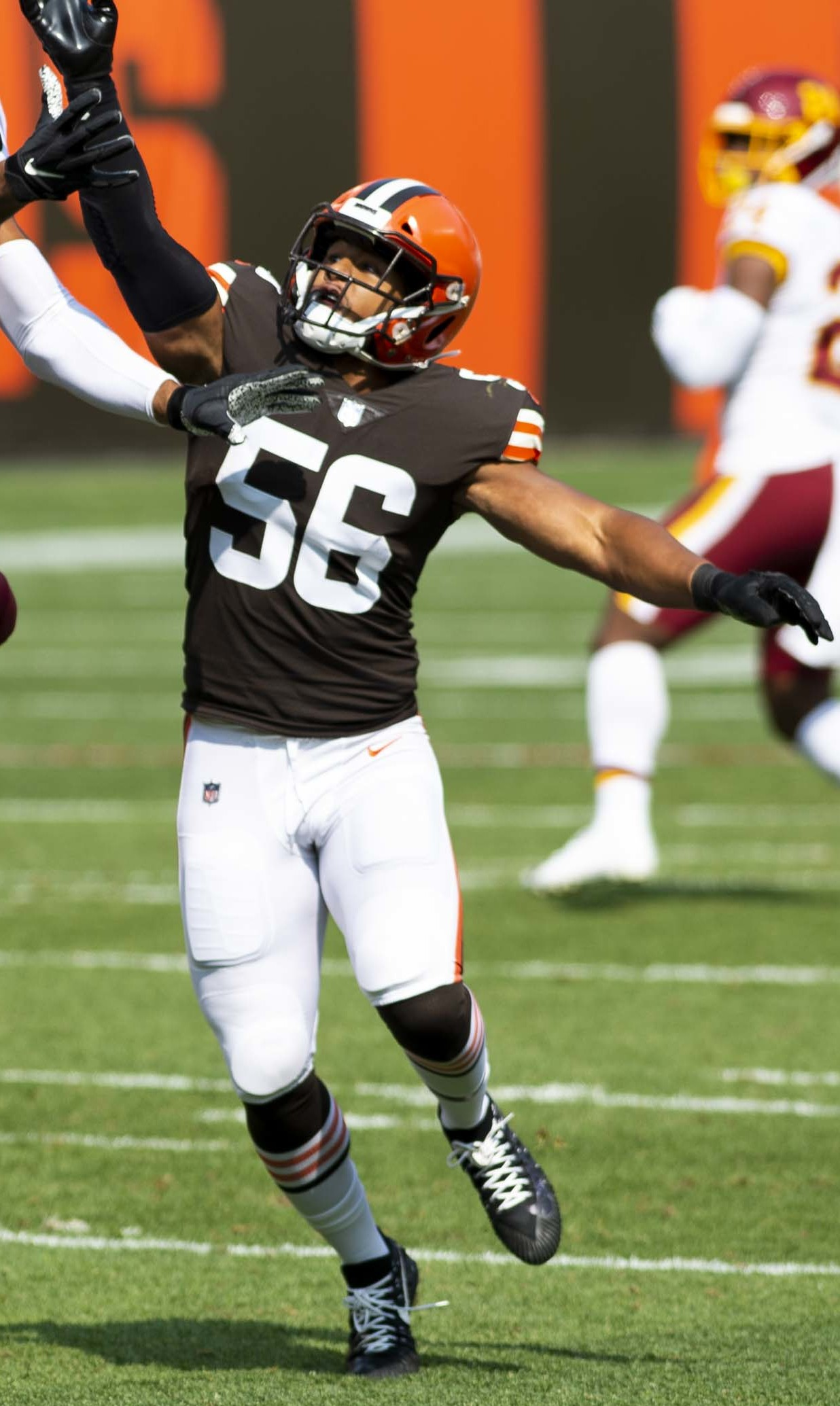
Smith in 2020

Smith signed with the Cleveland Browns on August 23, 2020.

During Week 3 against the Washington Football Team, Smith recorded his first interception as a Brown in the 34–20 victory. This was his first interception since 2016. Smith was placed on the reserve/COVID-19 list by the Browns on December 31, 2020, and was activated nine days later. Smith appeared in 15 games with four starts, collecting 72 tackles (fourth on the team), a sack, an interception, two passes defensed, and a forced fumble.

Smith re-signed with the Browns on March 18, 2021. He appeared in 15 games with 6 starts, registering 51 tackles, two interceptions, and five passes defensed.

== NFL career statistics ==
Legend
	Won the Super Bowl
	Super Bowl MVP
**Bold**	Career high

Year	Team	Games		Tackles				Fumbles				Interceptions				
Year	Team	GP	GS	Cmb	Solo	Ast	Sck	FF	FR	Yds	TD	Int	Yds	Lng	TD	PD
2011	SEA	12	0	16	10	6	1.0	**2**	0	0	0	0	0	0	0	0
2012	SEA	16	3	22	12	10	0.0	0	**1**	0	**1**	0	0	0	0	2
2013	SEA	15	8	54	34	20	1.0	1	**1**	**7**	0	**2**	**69**	**37**	**1**	4
2014	SEA	14	5	38	27	10	0.0	**2**	0	0	0	0	0	0	0	1
2015	OAK	16	16	**122**	**99**	**23**	**4.0**	**2**	0	0	0	1	27	27	0	**6**
2016	OAK	15	14	103	86	17	0.0	**2**	**1**	1	0	1	0	0	0	3
2017	SF	0	0	Did not play due to injury												
2018	SF	12	5	35	22	13	0.0	0	0	0	0	0	0	0	0	1
2019	JAX	2	0	0	0	0	0.0	0	0	0	0	0	0	0	0	0
2019	DAL	2	1	5	4	1	0.0	1	0	0	0	0	0	0	0	0
2020	CLE	15	4	72	49	**23**	1.0	1	0	0	0	1	2	2	0	2
2021	CLE	15	6	51	32	19	0.0	0	0	0	0	**2**	1	1	0	5
Career		134	62	518	376	142	7.0	11	3	8	1	7	99	37	1	24

== Personal life ==
Smith's brother, Steve, also attended USC from 2003 to 2006 and played wide receiver for the New York Giants, Philadelphia Eagles, and St. Louis Rams.

Smith has achalasia, a rare disorder of the esophagus that affects its ability to move food toward the stomach. It started to affect him around the time of the 2009 Rose Bowl, where he began losing a few pounds of body weight each week because food would get stuck in his esophagus and he would have to throw it up. The weight loss was a problem as Smith tried to keep his weight up to 230 pounds (100 kg). Originally diagnosed as acid reflux, further tests revealed the problem as achalasia. Smith underwent a surgical procedure called a Heller myotomy which helped somewhat, but he still has dietary restrictions that force him to eat very slowly.

On February 8, 2026, Smith served as the Seahawks' honorary captain at Super Bowl LX, which marked the Seahawks' second championship win.
