= 2011 Seattle Seahawks season =

American football team season

- Owner: Paul Allen
- General manager: John Schneider
- Head coach: Pete Carroll
- Home stadium: CenturyLink Field

Results
- Record: 7–9
- Division place: 3rd NFC West
- Playoffs: Did not qualify
- All-Pros: FS Earl Thomas (2nd team)
- Pro Bowlers: 5: FS Earl Thomas; CB Brandon Browner; RB Marshawn Lynch; SS Kam Chancellor; FB Michael Robinson

The 2011 season was the Seattle Seahawks' 36th in the National Football League (NFL), their 10th playing home games at CenturyLink Field (formerly known as Qwest Field) and their second under head coach Pete Carroll. It was the first season in over a decade in which the Seahawks came into the season with a new starting quarterback, as incumbent Matt Hasselbeck left for the Tennessee Titans in free agency. The Seahawks equaled their 7–9 record in 2010, but failed to defend their NFC West division title and missed the playoffs. This year was notable for the emergence of the Legion of Boom defensive group.

Until 2021, this was the last season the Seahawks finished with a losing record.

== Offseason ==
=== 2011 NFL draft ===
2011 Seattle Seahawks draft
Round	Pick	Player	Position	College	Notes
1	25	James Carpenter	T	Alabama	
3	75	John Moffitt	G	Wisconsin	from DET (Note: Detroit acquired Round 2 Pick 57 from Seattle in exchange for Detroit's third- (#75) and fourth-round (#107) selections. In addition the clubs swapped fifth- and seventh-round picks, with Detroit getting pick 157 and pick 209 and Seattle receiving pick 154 and pick 205.)
4	99	K. J. Wright *	LB	Mississippi State	from DEN (Note: The team acquired this fourth round selection (#99 overall) in a 2010 trade that sent WR Deion Branch to the New England Patriots.) (Note: The team traded its original fourth-round selection (#122 overall) and a 2012 conditional draft selection to the Buffalo Bills in exchange for RB Marshawn Lynch.)
4	107	Kris Durham	WR	Georgia	from DET (Note: Detroit acquired Round 2 Pick 57 from Seattle in exchange for Detroit's third- (#75) and fourth-round (#107) selections. In addition the clubs swapped fifth- and seventh-round picks, with Detroit getting pick 157 and pick 209 and Seattle receiving pick 154 and pick 205.)
5	154	Richard Sherman *	CB	Stanford	from KC (Note: #154: multiple trades: #154: Kansas City/Detroit swap. see #140: Detroit/Kansas City swap. #154: Detroit → Seattle (D). see #57: Seattle → Detroit.)
5	156	Mark LeGree	FS	Appalachian State	
6	173	Byron Maxwell	CB	Clemson	from DET (Note: The team traded its original sixth round selection (#190 overall) to the San Francisco 49ers in exchange for DE Kentwan Balmer.) (Note: The team acquired a new sixth round selection (#173 overall) in a trade that sent DE Lawrence Jackson to the Detroit Lions.)
7	205	Lazarius Levingston	DE	LSU	from DEN (Note: #205: multiple trades: #205: Denver → Detroit (PD). see #186: Detroit → Denver (PD). #205: Detroit → Seattle (D). see #57: Seattle → Detroit.)
7	242	Malcolm Smith	OLB	USC	(Note: Compensatory selection.)
Made roster † Pro Football Hall of Fame * Made at least one Pro Bowl during career

== Personnel ==
=== Staff / Coaches ===
Seattle Seahawks 2011 staff
Front office: Chairman – Paul Allen; President – Peter McLoughlin; General manager – John Schneider; Vice president of football administration – John Idzik; Vice president of football operations – Will Lewis; Senior personnel executive – Scot McCloughan; Director of pro personnel – Tag Ribary; Director of college scouting – Scott Fitterer; Assistant director of college scouting – Eric Stokes; Assistant director of pro personnel – Trent Kirchner; Head coaches: Executive Vice president of football operations/head coach– Pete Carroll; Assistant head coach/offensive line – Tom Cable; Offensive coaches: Offensive coordinator – Darrell Bevell; Quarterbacks – Carl Smith; Running backs – Sherman Smith; Wide receivers – Kippy Brown; Tight ends – Pat McPherson; Assistant offensive line – Pat Ruel; Quality control/offensive line – Luke Butkus; Offensive quality control – Dave Canales	Defensive coaches: Defensive coordinator – Gus Bradley; Defensive line – Todd Wash; Linebackers – Ken Norton, Jr.; Defensive backs – Kris Richard; Assistant defensive backs/safeties – Rocky Seto; Defensive assistant – Nate Carroll; Defensive quality control – Robert Saleh; Special teams coaches: Special teams coordinator – Brian Schneider; Assistant special teams – Jeff Ulbrich; Strength and conditioning: Head strength and conditioning – Chris Carlisle; Assistant strength and conditioning – Mondray Gee; Assistant strength and conditioning – Jamie Yancher

=== Final roster ===
2011 Seattle Seahawks roster
Quarterbacks (QB): 7 Tarvaris Jackson; 2 Josh Portis; 6 Charlie Whitehurst; Running backs (RB): 20 Justin Forsett; 24 Marshawn Lynch; 26 Michael Robinson FB; 33 Leon Washington RS; Wide receivers (WR): 15 Doug Baldwin; 11 Deon Butler; 83 Ricardo Lockette; 87 Ben Obomanu; 81 Golden Tate; Tight ends (TE): 85 Anthony McCoy; 86 Zach Miller; 88 Cameron Morrah	Offensive linemen (OL): 65 Allen Barbre T; 66 Paul Fanaika G; 72 Robert Gallery G; 68 Breno Giacomini T; 64 Mike Gibson G; 61 Lemuel Jeanpierre C/G; 77 Jarriel King T; 67 Paul McQuistan G/T; 60 Max Unger C; Defensive linemen (DL): 99 Alan Branch DT; 98 Raheem Brock DE; 79 Red Bryant DE; 91 Chris Clemons DE; 94 Anthony Hargrove DE; 93 Lazarius Levingston DT; 69 Clinton McDonald DT/DE; 92 Brandon Mebane DT	Linebackers (LB): 55 Heath Farwell MLB; 57 David Hawthorne MLB; 56 Leroy Hill OLB; 48 Mike Morgan OLB; 59 Adrian Moten OLB; 53 Malcolm Smith OLB; 50 K. J. Wright OLB; Defensive backs (DB): 40 Phillip Adams CB; 27 Atari Bigby SS; 39 Brandon Browner CB; 31 Kam Chancellor SS; 35 Kennard Cox CB; 32 Jeron Johnson SS; 34 Roy Lewis CB; 42 Chris Maragos FS; 41 Byron Maxwell CB; 25 Richard Sherman CB; 29 Earl Thomas FS; Special teams (ST): 49 Clint Gresham LS; 4 Stephen Hauschka K; 9 Jon Ryan P	Practice squad: 95 Pierre Allen DE; 44 Allen Bradford LB; 30 Jay Finley RB; 22 Coye Francies CB; 90 John Graves DT; 82 John Nalbone TE; 62 Brent Osborne G; 47 Vai Taua RB (Susp.); 19 Isaiah Williams WR; Reserve: 89 John Carlson TE (IR); 75 James Carpenter T (IR); 58 Dexter Davis OLB (IR); 16 Kris Durham WR (IR); 46 Jameson Konz OLB (IR); 52 Matt McCoy MLB (IR); 74 John Moffitt G (IR); 76 Russell Okung T (IR); 36 Ron Parker CB (IR); 18 Sidney Rice WR (IR); 28 Walter Thurmond CB (IR); 23 Marcus Trufant CB (IR); 54 David Vobora OLB (IR); 97 Jimmy Wilkerson DE (IR); 17 Mike Williams WR (IR); Rookies in italics 53 active, 16 reserve, 8 practice squad

== Preseason ==
=== Schedule ===
Week	Date	Opponent	Result	Record	Venue	Recap
1	August 11	at San Diego Chargers	W 24–17	1–0	Qualcomm Stadium	Recap
2	August 20	Minnesota Vikings	L 7–20	1–1	CenturyLink Field	Recap
3	August 27	at Denver Broncos	L 20–23	1–2	Sports Authority Field at Mile High	Recap
4	September 2	Oakland Raiders	W 20–3	2–2	CenturyLink Field	Recap

== Regular season ==
=== Schedule ===
Divisional matchups: the NFC West played the NFC East and the AFC North.

Week	Date	Opponent	Result	Record	Venue	Recap
1	September 11	at **San Francisco 49ers**	**L** 17–33	0–1	Candlestick Park	Recap
2	September 18	at Pittsburgh Steelers	**L** 0–24	0–2	Heinz Field	Recap
3	September 25	**Arizona Cardinals**	**W** 13–10	1–2	CenturyLink Field	Recap
4	October 2	Atlanta Falcons	**L** 28–30	1–3	CenturyLink Field	Recap
5	October 9	at New York Giants	**W** 36–25	2–3	MetLife Stadium	Recap
6	Bye					
7	October 23	at Cleveland Browns	**L** 3–6	2–4	Cleveland Browns Stadium	Recap
8	October 30	Cincinnati Bengals	**L** 12–34	2–5	CenturyLink Field	Recap
9	November 6	at Dallas Cowboys	**L** 13–23	2–6	Cowboys Stadium	Recap
10	November 13	Baltimore Ravens	**W** 22–17	3–6	CenturyLink Field	Recap
11	November 20	at **St. Louis Rams**	**W** 24–7	4–6	Edward Jones Dome	Recap
12	November 27	Washington Redskins	**L** 17–23	4–7	CenturyLink Field	Recap
13	December 1	Philadelphia Eagles	**W** 31–14	5–7	CenturyLink Field	Recap
14	December 12	**St. Louis Rams**	**W** 30–13	6–7	CenturyLink Field	Recap
15	December 18	at Chicago Bears	**W** 38–14	7–7	Soldier Field	Recap
16	December 24	**San Francisco 49ers**	**L** 17–19	7–8	CenturyLink Field	Recap
17	January 1, 2012	at **Arizona Cardinals**	**L** 20–23 (OT)	7–9	University of Phoenix Stadium	Recap

Bold indicates division opponents.
Source: 2011 NFL season results

== Standings ==
NFC West
	W	L	T	PCT	DIV	CONF	PF	PA	STK
^{(2)} San Francisco 49ers	13	3	0	.813	5–1	10–2	380	229	W3
Arizona Cardinals	8	8	0	.500	4–2	7–5	312	348	W1
Seattle Seahawks	7	9	0	.438	3–3	6–6	321	315	L2
St. Louis Rams	2	14	0	.125	0–6	1–11	193	407	L7

== Game summaries ==
=== Preseason ===
==== Week P1: at San Diego Chargers ====
Preseason Week 1: Seattle Seahawks at San Diego Chargers – Game summary

Quarter	1	2	3	4	Total
Seahawks	0	0	10	14	24
Chargers	7	3	7	0	17

at Qualcomm Stadium, San Diego, California

- Date: August 11
- Game time: 5:00pm local
- Game weather: clear, 69 °F (21 °C), 63% humidity, wind W 10 miles per hour (16 km/h)
- Game attendance: 55,318
- Referee: Jerome Boger
- TV: ESPN
- Gamecenter, Gamebook

==== Week P2: vs. Minnesota Vikings ====
Preseason Week 2: Seattle Seahawks vs. Minnesota Vikings – Game summary

Quarter	1	2	3	4	Total
Vikings	7	6	0	7	20
Seahawks	0	0	0	7	7

at CenturyLink Field, Seattle

- Date: August 20
- Game time: 7:06pm local
- Game weather: clear, 82 °F (28 °C), wind NW 8 miles per hour (13 km/h)
- Game attendance: 65,599
- Referee: Clete Blakeman
- TV: KING
- Gamecenter, Gamebook

==== Week P3: at Denver Broncos ====
Preseason Week 3: Seattle Seahawks at Denver Broncos – Game summary

Quarter	1	2	3	4	Total
Seahawks	3	0	0	17	20
Broncos	0	10	7	6	23

at Sports Authority Field at Mile High, Denver, Colorado

- Date: August 27
- Game time: 7:05pm local
- Game weather: cloudy, 87 °F (31 °C), 28% humidity, wind NE 11 miles per hour (18 km/h)
- Game attendance: 72,347
- Referee: Bill Leavy
- TV: KING
- Gamecenter, Gamebook

==== Week P4: vs. Oakland Raiders ====
Preseason Week 4: Seattle Seahawks vs. Oakland Raiders – Game summary

Quarter	1	2	3	4	Total
Raiders	0	3	0	0	3
Seahawks	3	7	0	10	20

at CenturyLink Field, Seattle

- Date: September 2
- Game time: 7:36pm local
- Game weather: clear, 68 °F (20 °C), 46% humidity, wind NW 8 miles per hour (13 km/h)
- Game attendance: 65,418
- Referee: Ed Hochuli
- TV: KING
- Gamecenter, Gamebook

=== Regular season ===
==== Week 1: at San Francisco 49ers ====
Week 1: Seattle Seahawks at San Francisco 49ers – Game summary

Quarter	1	2	3	4	Total
Seahawks	0	0	7	10	17
49ers	0	16	0	17	33

at Candlestick Park, San Francisco

- Date: September 11
- Game time: 1:22pm local
- Game weather: cloudy, 68 °F (20 °C), 63% humidity, wind S 15 miles per hour (24 km/h)
- Game attendance: 69,732
- Referee: Jeff Triplette
- TV announcers (Fox): Dick Stockton, John Lynch & Jaime Maggio
- Gamecenter, Gamebook

Game information

First quarter

- No scoring plays

Second quarter

- SF – David Akers 27-yard field goal, 14:10 (SF 3–0)
- SF – David Akers 24-yard field goal, 11:22 (SF 6–0)
- SF – David Akers 31-yard field goal, 2:40 (SF 9–0)
- SF – Alex Smith 1-yard run (David Akers kick), 0:12 (SF 16–0)

Third quarter

- SEA – Golden Tate 8-yard pass from Tarvaris Jackson (Steven Hauschka kick), 10:20 (SF 16–7)

Fourth quarter

- SEA – Steven Hauschka 39-yard field goal, 14:55 (SF 16–10)
- SF – David Akers 18-yard field goal, 5:54 (SF 19–10)
- SEA – Doug Baldwin 55-yard pass from Tarvaris Jackson (Steven Hauschka kick), 3:56 (SF 19–17)
- SF – Ted Ginn Jr. 102-yard kickoff return (David Akers kick), 3:45 (SF 26–17)
- SF – Ted Ginn 55-yard punt return (David Akers kick), 2:46 (SF 33–17)

Top passers

- SEA – Tarvaris Jackson – 21/37, 197 yds, 2 TD, 1 INT
- SF – Alex Smith – 15/20, 124 yds

Top rushers

- SEA – Marshawn Lynch – 13 car, 33 yds
- SF – Frank Gore – 22 car, 59 yds

Top receivers

- SEA – Doug Baldwin – 4 rec, 83 yds, 1 TD
- SF – Vernon Davis – 5 rec, 47 yds

With the loss, the Seahawks started the season 0–1.

==== Week 2: at Pittsburgh Steelers ====
Week 2: Seattle Seahawks at Pittsburgh Steelers – Game summary

Quarter	1	2	3	4	Total
Seahawks	0	0	0	0	0
Steelers	7	10	7	0	24

at Heinz Field, Pittsburgh, Pennsylvania

- Date: September 18
- Game time: 1:02pm local
- Game weather: partly cloudy, 63 °F (17 °C), 59% humidity, wind ESE 12 miles per hour (19 km/h)
- Game attendance: 63,663
- Referee: Bill Leavy
- TV announcers (Fox): Kenny Albert, Daryl Johnston & Tony Siragusa
- Gamecenter, Gamebook

Game information

First quarter

- PIT – Rashard Mendenhall 1-yard run (Shaun Suisham kick), 3:28 (PIT 7–0)

Second quarter

- PIT – Isaac Redman 20-yard run (Shaun Suisham kick), 12:41 (PIT 14–0)
- PIT – Shaun Suisham 20-yard field goal, 1:52 (PIT 17–0)

Third quarter

- PIT – Mike Wallace 2-yard pass from Ben Roethlisberger (Shaun Suisham kick), 3:30 (PIT 24–0)

Fourth quarter

- No scoring plays

Top passers

- SEA – Tarvaris Jackson – 20/29, 159 yds
- PIT – Ben Roethlisberger – 22/30, 298 yds, 1 TD

Top rushers

- SEA – Tarvaris Jackson – 3 car, 12 yds
- PIT – Rashard Mendenhall – 19 car, 66 yds, 1 TD

Top receivers

- SEA – Ben Obomanu – 4 rec, 35 yds
- PIT – Mike Wallace – 8 rec, 126 yds, 1 TD

The Seahawks were shut out for the first time since 2007 and for the 2nd consecutive game by the Steelers (The teams faced each other in 2007 in which the Steelers became victorious with a 21–0 win.) The team fell to 0–2 on the season.

==== Week 3: vs. Arizona Cardinals ====
Week 3: Arizona Cardinals at Seattle Seahawks – Game summary

Quarter	1	2	3	4	Total
Cardinals	0	10	0	0	10
Seahawks	3	3	7	0	13

at CenturyLink Field, Seattle

- Date: September 25
- Game time: 1:15pm local
- Game weather: rain, 68 °F (20 °C), wind S 20 miles per hour (32 km/h)
- Game attendance: 66,199
- Referee: Alberto Riveron
- TV announcers (Fox): Chris Myers, Tim Ryan & Drea Avent
- Gamecenter, Gamebook

Game information

First quarter

- SEA – Steven Hauschka 30-yard field goal, 2:55 (SEA 3–0)

Second quarter

- ARI – Jay Feely 44-yard field goal, 12:48 (Tied 3–3)
- ARI – Larry Fitzgerald 12-yard pass from Kevin Kolb (Jay Feely kick), 7:29 (ARI 10–3)
- SEA – Steven Hauschka 19-yard field goal, 0:43 (ARI 10–6)

Third quarter

- SEA – Tarvaris Jackson 11-yard run (Steven Hauschka kick), 5:57 (SEA 13–10)

Fourth quarter

- No scoring plays

Top passers

- ARI – Kevin Kolb – 25/39, 252 yds, 1 TD, 2 INT
- SEA – Tarvaris Jackson – 18/31, 171 yds, 1 INT

Top rushers

- ARI – Alfonso Smith – 17 car, 54 yds
- SEA – Marshawn Lynch – 19 car, 73 yds

Top receivers

- ARI – Larry Fitzgerald – 5 rec, 64 yds, 1 TD
- SEA – Sidney Rice – 8 rec, 109 yds

With the win, the Seahawks improved to 1–2.

==== Week 4: vs. Atlanta Falcons ====
Week 4: Atlanta Falcons at Seattle Seahawks – Game summary

Quarter	1	2	3	4	Total
Falcons	7	17	3	3	30
Seahawks	0	7	14	7	28

at CenturyLink Field, Seattle

- Date: October 2
- Game time: 1:05pm local
- Game weather: partly cloudy, 58 °F (14 °C), wind calm
- Game attendance: 66,266
- Referee: Walt Anderson
- TV announcers (Fox): Craig Bolerjack & John Lynch
- Gamecenter, Gamebook

Game information

First quarter

- ATL – Tony Gonzalez 1-yard pass from Matt Ryan (Matt Bryant kick), 6:08 (ATL 7–0)

Second quarter

- ATL – Michael Turner 21-yard run (Matt Bryant kick), 10:13 (ATL 14–0)
- SEA – Sidney Rice 52-yard pass from Tarvaris Jackson (Steven Hauschka kick), 8:46 (ATL 14–7)
- ATL – Michael Turner 1-yard run (Matt Bryant kick), 2:48 (ATL 21–7)
- ATL – Matt Bryant 47-yard field goal, 0:25 (ATL 24–7)

Third quarter

- ATL – Matt Bryant 50-yard field goal, 13:40 (ATL 27–7)
- SEA – Mike Williams 6-yard pass from Tarvaris Jackson (Steven Hauschka kick), 10:01 (ATL 27–14)
- SEA – Marshawn Lynch 11-yard run (Steven Hauschka kick), 3:07 (ATL 27–21)

Fourth quarter

- ATL – Matt Bryant 42-yard field goal, 11:38 (ATL 30–21)
- SEA – Ben Obomanu 8-yard pass from Tarvaris Jackson (Steven Hauschka kick), 8:13 (ATL 30–28)

Top passers

- ATL –Matt Ryan – 28/42, 291 yds, 1 TD
- SEA – Tarvaris Jackson – 25/38, 319 yds, 3 TD, 2 INT

Top rushers

- ATL – Michael Turner – 26 car, 70 yds, 2 TD
- SEA – Marshawn Lynch – 8 car, 24 yds, 1 TD

Top receivers

- ATL – Julio Jones – 11 rec, 127 yds
- SEA – Doug Baldwin – 5 rec, 84 yds

With the loss, the Seahawks fell to 1–3.

==== Week 5: at New York Giants ====
Week 5: Seattle Seahawks at New York Giants – Game summary

Quarter	1	2	3	4	Total
Seahawks	14	0	2	20	36
Giants	7	7	0	11	25

at MetLife Stadium, East Rutherford, New Jersey

- Date: October 9
- Game time: 1:04pm local
- Game weather: clear, 81 °F (27 °C), 42% humidity, wind NW 4 miles per hour (6.4 km/h)
- Game attendance: 78,650
- Referee: Ed Hochuli
- TV announcers (Fox): Thom Brennaman, Troy Aikman & Pam Oliver
- Gamecenter, Gamebook

Game information

First quarter

- SEA – Ben Obomanu 11-yard pass from Tarvaris Jackson (Steven Hauschka kick), 12:28 (SEA 7–0)
- NYG – Jake Ballard 12-yard pass from Eli Manning (Lawrence Tynes kick), 9:08 (Tied 7–7)
- SEA – Marshawn Lynch 1-yard run (Steven Hauschka kick), 3:00 (SEA 14–7)

Second quarter

- NYG – Hakeem Nicks 19-yard pass from Eli Manning (Lawrence Tynes kick), 0:11 (Tied 14–14)

Third quarter

- SEA – Safety, Anthony Hargrove tackled DJ Ware in end zone, 7:02 (SEA 16–14)

Fourth quarter

- SEA – Steven Hauschka 51-yard field goal, 14:28 (SEA 19–14)
- NYG – Victor Cruz 68-yard pass from Eli Manning (Ahmad Bradshaw run), 12:37 (NYG 22–19)
- SEA – Steven Hauschka 43-yard field goal, 10:15 (Tied 22–22)
- NYG – Lawrence Tynes 26-yard field goal, 4:49 (NYG 25–22)
- SEA – Doug Baldwin 27-yard pass from Charlie Whitehurst (Steven Hauschka kick), 2:37 (SEA 29–25)
- SEA – Brandon Browner 94-yard interception return (Steven Hauschka kick), 1:08 (SEA 36–25)

Top passers

- SEA – Tarvaris Jackson – 15/22, 166 yds, 1 TD, 1 INT
- NYG – Eli Manning – 24/39, 420 yds, 3 TD, 3 INT

Top rushers

- SEA – Marshawn Lynch – 12 car, 98 yds, 1 TD
- NYG – Ahmad Bradshaw – 17 car, 58 yds

Top receivers

- SEA – Doug Baldwin – 8 rec, 136 yds, 1 TD
- NYG – Victor Cruz – 8 rec, 161 yds, 1 TD

With the win, the Seahawks went into their bye week at 2–3.

==== Week 7: at Cleveland Browns ====
Week 7: Seattle Seahawks at Cleveland Browns – Game summary

Quarter	1	2	3	4	Total
Seahawks	0	0	3	0	3
Browns	0	3	0	3	6

at Cleveland Browns Stadium, Cleveland, Ohio

- Date: October 23
- Game time: 1:05pm local
- Game weather: clear, 56 °F (13 °C), 53% humidity, wind S 7 miles per hour (11 km/h)
- Game attendance: 66,350
- Referee: Mike Carey
- TV announcers (Fox): Ron Pitts, Jim Mora, Jr. & Drea Avent
- Gamecenter, Gamebook

Game information

First quarter

- No scoring plays

Second quarter

- CLE – Phil Dawson 52-yard field goal, 7:26 (CLE 3–0)

Third quarter

- SEA – Steven Hauschka 20-yard field goal, 2:33 (Tied 3–3)

Fourth quarter

- CLE – Phil Dawson 53-yard field goal, 11:18 (CLE 6–3)

Top passers

- SEA – Charlie Whitehurst – 12/30, 97 yds, 1 INT
- CLE – Colt McCoy – 30/35, 178 yds, 1 INT

Top rushers

- SEA – Leon Washington – 7 car, 39 yds
- CLE – Montario Hardesty – 33 car, 95 yds

Top receivers

- SEA – Sidney Rice – 2 rec, 38 yds
- CLE – Chris Ogbonnaya – 5 rec, 43 yds

With the loss, the Seahawks fell to 2–4.

==== Week 8: vs. Cincinnati Bengals ====
Week 8: Cincinnati Bengals at Seattle Seahawks – Game summary

Quarter	1	2	3	4	Total
Bengals	10	7	0	17	34
Seahawks	0	3	3	6	12

at CenturyLink Field, Seattle

- Date: October 30
- Game time: 1:15pm local
- Game weather: cloudy, 56 °F (13 °C), wind SSW 14 miles per hour (23 km/h)
- Game attendance: 66,004
- Referee: Tony Corrente
- TV announcers (CBS): Bill Macatee & Steve Tasker
- Gamecenter, Gamebook

Game information

First quarter

- CIN – Mike Nugent 34-yard field goal, 6:44 (CIN 3–0)
- CIN – Jerome Simpson 14-yard pass from Andy Dalton (Mike Nugent kick), 3:47 (CIN 10–0)

Second quarter

- SEA – Steven Hauschka 47-yard field goal, 14:55 (CIN 10–3)
- CIN – A. J. Green 43-yard pass from Andy Dalton (Mike Nugent kick), 1:51 (CIN 17–3)

Third quarter

- SEA – Steven Hauschka 25-yard field goal, 0:04 (CIN 17–6)

Fourth quarter

- SEA – Marshawn Lynch 2-yard run (PAT failed), 8:55 (CIN 17–12)
- CIN – Mike Nugent 48-yard field goal, 4:50 (CIN 20–12)
- CIN – Brandon Tate 56-yard punt return (Mike Nugent kick), 3:22 (CIN 27–12)
- CIN – Reggie Nelson 75-yard interception return (Mike Nugent kick), 0:36 (CIN 34–12)

Top passers

- CIN – Andy Dalton – 18/29, 168 yds, 2 TD, 2 INT
- SEA – Tarvaris Jackson – 21/40, 323 yds, 1 INT

Top rushers

- CIN – Bernard Scott – 22 car, 76 yds
- SEA – Leon Washington – 2 car, 34 yds

Top receivers

- CIN – A. J. Green – 4 rec, 63 yds, 1 TD
- SEA – Ben Obomanu – 4 rec, 107 yds

With the loss, the Seahawks fell to 2–5. This would be their last home loss to an AFC opponent until a 25-17 defeat against the Los Angeles Chargers in 2018.

==== Week 9: at Dallas Cowboys ====
Week 9: Seattle Seahawks at Dallas Cowboys – Game summary

Quarter	1	2	3	4	Total
Seahawks	3	3	0	7	13
Cowboys	3	3	7	10	23

at Cowboys Stadium, Arlington, Texas

- Date: November 6
- Game time: 12:02pm local
- Game weather: indoors
- Game attendance: 81,510
- Referee: Terry McAulay
- TV announcers (Fox): Chris Myers, Tim Ryan & Jaime Maggio
- Gamecenter, Gamebook

Game information

First quarter

- DAL – Dan Bailey 20-yard field goal, 4:25 (DAL 3–0)
- SEA – Steven Hauschka 45-yard field goal, 0:04 (Tied 3–3)

Second quarter

- DAL – Dan Bailey 20-yard field goal, 10:23 (DAL 6–3)
- SEA – Steven Hauschka 32-yard field goal, 1:03 (Tied 6–6)

Third quarter

- DAL – Jason Witten 33-yard pass from Tony Romo (Dan Bailey kick), 8:39 (DAL 13–6)

Fourth quarter

- DAL – Laurent Robinson 6-yard pass from Tony Romo (Dan Bailey kick), 14:10 (DAL 20–6)
- DAL – Dan Bailey 42-yard field goal, 11:22 (DAL 23–6)
- SEA – Marshawn Lynch 4-yard run (Steven Hauschka kick), 6:12 (DAL 23–13)

Top passers

- SEA – Tarvaris Jackson – 17/30, 221 yds, 3 INT
- DAL – Tony Romo – 19/31, 279 yds, 2 TD

Top rushers

- SEA – Marshawn Lynch – 23 car, 135 yds, 1 TD
- DAL – DeMarco Murray – 22 car, 139 yds

Top receivers

- SEA – Sidney Rice – 3 rec, 69 yds
- DAL – Dez Bryant – 4 rec, 76 yds

With the loss, the Seahawks fell to 2–6. This is the last game the Seahawks would lose by double digits until the Week 2 game against the Packers in the 2015 season (including playoffs).

==== Week 10: vs. Baltimore Ravens ====
Week 10: Baltimore Ravens at Seattle Seahawks – Game summary

Quarter	1	2	3	4	Total
Ravens	0	7	3	7	17
Seahawks	10	9	3	0	22

at CenturyLink Field, Seattle

- Date: November 13
- Game time: 1:06pm local
- Game weather: cloudy, 50 °F (10 °C), wind SSW 10 miles per hour (16 km/h)
- Game attendance: 66,522
- Referee: Scott Green
- TV announcers (CBS): Greg Gumbel & Dan Dierdorf
- Gamecenter, Gamebook

Game information

First quarter

- SEA – Marshawn Lynch 1-yard run (Steven Hauschka kick), 8:07 (SEA 7–0)
- SEA – Steven Hauschka 22-yard field goal, 5:26 (SEA 10–0)

Second quarter

- BAL – Ed Dickson 1-yard pass from Ray Rice (Billy Cundiff kick), 9:11 (SEA 10–7)
- SEA – Steven Hauschka 38-yard field goal, 5:39 (SEA 13–7)
- SEA – Steven Hauschka 39-yard field goal, 1:52 (SEA 16–7)
- SEA – Steven Hauschka 35-yard field goal, 0:46 (SEA 19–7)

Third quarter

- SEA – Steven Hauschka 30-yard field goal, 12:26 (SEA 22–7)
- BAL – Billy Cundiff 35-yard field goal, 0:52 (SEA 22–10)

Fourth quarter

- BAL – Ed Dickson 11-yard pass from Joe Flacco (Billy Cundiff kick), 5:52 (SEA 22–17)

Top passers

- BAL – Joe Flacco – 29/52, 255 yds, 1 TD, 1 INT
- SEA – Tarvaris Jackson – 17/27, 217 yds

Top rushers

- BAL – Ray Rice – 5 car, 27 yds
- SEA – Marshawn Lynch – 32 car, 109 yds, 1 TD

Top receivers

- BAL – Ed Dickson – 10 rec, 79 yds, 2 TD
- SEA – Marshawn Lynch – 5 rec, 58 yds

With the win, the Seahawks improved to 3–6.

==== Week 11: at St. Louis Rams ====
Week 11: Seattle Seahawks at St. Louis Rams – Game summary

Quarter	1	2	3	4	Total
Seahawks	0	10	7	7	24
Rams	7	0	0	0	7

at Edward Jones Dome, St. Louis, Missouri

- Date: November 20
- Game time: 3:05pm local
- Game weather: indoors
- Game attendance: 56,400
- Referee: Carl Cheffers
- TV announcers (Fox): Chris Myers, Tim Ryan & Jaime Maggio
- Gamecenter, Gamebook

Game information

First quarter

- STL – Brandon Lloyd 30-yard pass from Sam Bradford (Josh Brown kick), 9:15 (STL 7–0)

Second quarter

- SEA – Sidney Rice 14-yard pass from Tarvaris Jackson (Steven Hauschka kick), 8:36 (Tied 7–7)
- SEA – Steven Hauschka 19-yard field goal, 0:00 (SEA 10–7)

Third quarter

- SEA – Marshawn Lynch 3-yard run (Steven Hauschka kick), 5:58 (SEA 17–7)

Fourth quarter

- SEA – Justin Forsett 22-yard run (Steven Hauschka kick), 4:21 (SEA 24–7)

Top passers

- SEA – Tarvaris Jackson – 14/24, 148 yds, 1 TD, 2 INT
- STL – Sam Bradford – 20/40, 181 yds, 1 TD, 1 INT

Top rushers

- SEA – Marshawn Lynch – 27 car, 88 yds, 1 TD
- STL – Steven Jackson – 15 car, 42 yds

Top receivers

- SEA – Mike Williams – 2 rec, 62 yds
- STL – Brandon Lloyd – 5 rec, 67 yds, 1 TD

With the win, the Seahawks improved to 4–6.

==== Week 12: vs. Washington Redskins ====
Week 12: Washington Redskins at Seattle Seahawks – Game summary

Quarter	1	2	3	4	Total
Redskins	7	0	0	16	23
Seahawks	0	7	3	7	17

at CenturyLink Field, Seattle

- Date: November 27
- Game time: 1:07pm local
- Game weather: rain, 52 °F (11 °C), wind SSW 13 miles per hour (21 km/h)
- Game attendance: 66,007
- Referee: Clete Blakeman
- TV announcers (Fox): Ron Pitts, Charles Davis & Drea Avent
- Gamecenter, Gamebook

Game information

First quarter

- WAS – Fred Davis 2-yard pass from Rex Grossman (Graham Gano kick), 7:11 (WAS 7–0)

Second quarter

- SEA – Marshawn Lynch 20-yard pass from Tarvaris Jackson (Steven Hauschka kick), 11:01 (Tied 7–7)

Third quarter

- SEA – Steven Hauschka 36-yard field goal, 5:58 (SEA 10–7)

Fourth quarter

- SEA – Golden Tate 15-yard pass from Tarvaris Jackson (Steven Hauschka kick), 12:45 (SEA 17–7)
- WAS – Roy Helu 28-yard run (Graham Gano kick), 9:51 (SEA 17–14)
- WAS – Anthony Armstrong 50-yard pass from Rex Grossman (PAT failed), 6:18 (WAS 20–17)
- WAS – Graham Gano 25-yard field goal, 1:06 (WAS 23–17)

Top passers

- WAS – Rex Grossman – 26/35, 314 yds, 2 TD, 2 INT
- SEA – Tarvaris Jackson – 14/30, 144 yds, 2 TD, 1 INT

Top rushers

- WAS – Roy Helu – 23 car, 108 yds, 1 TD
- SEA – Marshawn Lynch – 24 car, 111 yds

Top receivers

- WAS – Jabar Gaffney – 5 rec, 72 yds
- SEA – Doug Baldwin – 5 rec, 60 yds

With the loss, the Seahawks fell to 4–7.

==== Week 13: vs. Philadelphia Eagles ====
Week 13: Philadelphia Eagles at Seattle Seahawks – Game summary

Quarter	1	2	3	4	Total
Eagles	0	7	0	7	14
Seahawks	7	10	7	7	31

at CenturyLink Field, Seattle

- Date: December 1
- Game time: 5:29pm local
- Game weather: clear, 38 °F (3 °C), wind S 2 miles per hour (3.2 km/h)
- Game attendance: 67,039
- Referee: Pete Morelli
- TV announcers (NFL Network): Brad Nessler, Mike Mayock & Alex Flanagan
- Gamecenter, Gamebook

Game information

First quarter

- SEA – Marshawn Lynch 15-yard run (Steven Hauschka kick), 9:19 (SEA 7–0)

Second quarter

- SEA – Marshawn Lynch 40-yard run (Steven Hauschka kick), 14:50 (SEA 14–0)
- PHI – LeSean McCoy 1-yard run (Alex Henery kick), 11:43 (SEA 14–7)
- SEA – Steven Hauschka 49-yard field goal, 0:16 (SEA 17–7)

Third quarter

- SEA – Golden Tate 11-yard pass from Tarvaris Jackson (Steven Hauschka kick), 8:04 (SEA 24–7)

Fourth quarter

- PHI – LeSean McCoy 2-yard pass from Vince Young (Alex Henery kick), 12:51 (SEA 24–14)
- SEA – David Hawthorne 77-yard interception return (Steven Hauschka kick), 4:24 (SEA 31–14)

Top passers

- PHI – Vince Young – 17/29, 208 yds, 1 TD, 4 INT
- SEA – Tarvaris Jackson – 13/16, 190 yds, 1 TD

Top rushers

- PHI – LeSean McCoy – 17 car, 84 yds, 1 TD
- SEA – Marshawn Lynch – 22 car, 148 yds, 2 TD

Top receivers

- PHI – Riley Cooper – 5 rec, 94 yds
- SEA – Zach Miller – 2 rec, 53 yds

With the win, the Seahawks improved to 5–7.

==== Week 14: vs. St. Louis Rams ====
Week 14: St. Louis Rams at Seattle Seahawks – Game summary

Quarter	1	2	3	4	Total
Rams	0	3	3	7	13
Seahawks	10	0	10	10	30

at CenturyLink Field, Seattle

- Date: December 12
- Game time: 5:40pm local
- Game weather: clear, 40 °F (4 °C), wind NNE 7 miles per hour (11 km/h)
- Game attendance: 66,577
- Referee: Bill Leavy
- TV announcers (ESPN): Mike Tirico, Ron Jaworski, Jon Gruden & Rachel Nichols
- Gamecenter, Gamebook

Game information

First quarter

- SEA – Michael Robinson 17-yard blocked punt return (Steven Hauschka kick), 9:57 (SEA 7–0)
- SEA – Steven Hauschka 42-yard field goal, 1:35 (SEA 10–0)

Second quarter

- STL – Josh Brown 46-yard field goal, 11:04 (SEA 10–3)

Third quarter

- SEA – Steven Hauschka 23-yard field goal, 12:03 (SEA 13–3)
- STL – Josh Brown 29-yard field goal, 1:49 (SEA 13–6)
- SEA – Doug Baldwin 29-yard pass from Tarvaris Jackson (Steven Hauschka kick), 0:06 (SEA 20–6)

Fourth quarter

- SEA – Steven Hauschka 28-yard field goal, 8:27 (SEA 23–6)
- STL – Steven Jackson 1-yard run (Josh Brown kick), 4:39 (SEA 23–13)
- SEA – Marshawn Lynch 16-yard run (Steven Hauschka kick), 2:57 (SEA 30–13)

Top passers

- STL – Sam Bradford – 12/29, 193 yds, 1 INT
- SEA – Tarvaris Jackson – 21/32, 224 yds, 1 TD

Top rushers

- STL – Steven Jackson – 20 car, 63 yds, 1 TD
- SEA – Marshawn Lynch – 23 car, 115 yds, 1 TD

Top receivers

- STL – Brandon Lloyd – 5 rec, 82 yds
- SEA – Doug Baldwin – 7 rec, 93 yds, 1 TD

With the win, the Seahawks improved to 6–7 and swept the Rams for the first time since 2009 and embarked on working on another major winning streak against the team. Also, the Seahawks took the trend of winning 13 out of the last 14 games against the Rams dating back to 2005.

==== Week 15: at Chicago Bears ====
Week 15: Seattle Seahawks at Chicago Bears – Game summary

Quarter	1	2	3	4	Total
Seahawks	7	0	17	14	38
Bears	7	7	0	0	14

at Soldier Field, Chicago, Illinois

- Date: December 18
- Game time: 12:03pm local
- Game weather: clear, 39 °F (4 °C), 65% humidity, wind S 5 miles per hour (8.0 km/h)
- Game attendance: 61,542
- Referee: Ed Hochuli
- TV announcers (Fox): Chris Myers, Tim Ryan & Jaime Maggio
- Gamecenter, Gamebook

Game information

First quarter

- SEA – Marshawn Lynch 2-yard run (Steven Hauschka kick), 8:41 (SEA 7–0)
- CHI – Israel Idonije recovered fumble in end zone (Robbie Gould kick), 2:23 (Tied 7–7)

Second quarter

- CHI – Kahlil Bell 25-yard pass from Caleb Hanie (Robbie Gould kick), 1:51 (CHI 14–7)

Third quarter

- SEA – Marshawn Lynch 3-yard run (Steven Hauschka kick), 13:02 (Tied 14–14)
- SEA – Red Bryant 20-yard interception return (Steven Hauschka kick), 12:12 (SEA 21–14)
- SEA – Steven Hauschka 33-yard field goal, 1:03 (SEA 24–14)

Fourth quarter

- SEA – Michael Robinson 2-yard pass from Tarvaris Jackson (Steven Hauschka kick), 12:39 (SEA 31–14)
- SEA – Brandon Browner 42-yard interception return (Steven Hauschka kick), 5:00 (SEA 38–14)

Top passers

- SEA – Tarvaris Jackson – 19/31, 227 yds, 1 TD
- CHI – Caleb Hanie – 10/23, 111 yds, 1 TD, 3 INT

Top rushers

- SEA – Marshawn Lynch – 20 car, 42 yds, 2 TD
- CHI – Kahlil Bell – 15 car, 65 yds

Top receivers

- SEA – Golden Tate – 4 rec, 61 yds
- CHI – Kahlil Bell – 5 rec, 43 yds, 1 TD

With the win, the Seahawks improved to 7–7.

==== Week 16: vs. San Francisco 49ers ====
Week 16: San Francisco 49ers at Seattle Seahawks – Game summary

Quarter	1	2	3	4	Total
49ers	0	3	10	6	19
Seahawks	7	3	0	7	17

at CenturyLink Field, Seattle

- Date: December 24
- Game time: 1:16pm local
- Game weather: cloudy, 48 °F (9 °C), wind SSE 8 miles per hour (13 km/h)
- Game attendance: 66,697
- Referee: Ron Winter
- TV announcers (Fox): Ron Pitts, Charles Davis & Drea Avent
- Gamecenter, Gamebook

Game information

First quarter

- SEA – Doug Baldwin 13-yard pass from Tarvaris Jackson (Steven Hauschka kick), 11:35 (SEA 7–0)

Second quarter

- SF – David Akers 53-yard field goal, 14:28 (SEA 7–3)
- SEA – Steven Hauschka 19-yard field goal, 1:30 (SEA 10–3)

Third quarter

- SF – Frank Gore 4-yard run (David Akers kick), 11:01 (Tied 10–10)
- SF – David Akers 29-yard field goal, 4:04 (SF 13–10)

Fourth quarter

- SF – David Akers 44-yard field goal, 12:37 (SF 16–10)
- SEA – Marshawn Lynch 4-yard run (Steven Hauschka kick), 6:41 (SEA 17–16)
- SF – David Akers 39-yard field goal, 2:57 (SF 19–17)

Top passers

- SF – Alex Smith – 14/26, 179 yds
- SEA – Tarvaris Jackson – 15/28, 163 yds, 1 TD

Top rushers

- SF – Frank Gore – 23 car, 83 yds, 1 TD
- SEA – Marshawn Lynch – 21 car, 107 yds, 1 TD

Top receivers

- SF – Michael Crabtree – 5 rec, 85 yds
- SEA – Ricardo Lockette – 1 rec, 44 yds

With the loss, the Seahawks fell to 7–8 and were swept by the 49ers for the first time since 2006.

==== Week 17: at Arizona Cardinals ====
Week 17: Seattle Seahawks at Arizona Cardinals – Game summary

Quarter	1	2	3	4	OT	Total
Seahawks	0	3	7	10	0	20
Cardinals	7	3	7	3	3	23

at University of Phoenix Stadium, Glendale, Arizona

- Date: January 1
- Game time: 2:15pm local
- Game weather: indoors
- Game attendance: 61,798
- Referee: Gene Steratore
- TV announcers (Fox): Sam Rosen & Chad Pennington
- Gamecenter, Gamebook

Game information

First quarter

- ARI – Chester Taylor 1-yard run (Jay Feely kick), 3:02 (ARI 7–0)

Second quarter

- SEA – Steven Hauschka 19-yard field goal, 12:10 (ARI 7–3)
- ARI – Jay Feely 30-yard field goal, 3:28 (ARI 10–3)

Third quarter

- SEA – Leon Washington 48-yard run (Steven Hauschka kick), 10:56 (Tied 10–10)
- ARI – Todd Heap 13-yard pass from John Skelton (Jay Feely kick), 6:18 (ARI 17–10)

Fourth quarter

- ARI – Jay Feely 43-yard field goal, 12:18 (ARI 20–10)
- SEA – Steven Hauschka 26-yard field goal, 9:05 (ARI 20–13)
- SEA – Ricardo Lockette 61-yard pass from Tarvaris Jackson (Steven Hauschka kick), 7:47 (Tied 20–20)

Overtime

- ARI – Jay Feely 28-yard field goal, 5:59 (ARI 23–20)

Top passers

- SEA – Tarvaris Jackson – 21/35, 222 yds, 1 TD, 1 INT
- ARI – John Skelton – 22/40, 271 yds, 1 TD, 1 INT

Top rushers

- SEA – Marshawn Lynch – 19 car, 86 yds
- ARI – LaRod Stephens-Howling – 21 car, 93 yds

Top receivers

- SEA – Ricardo Lockette – 1 rec, 61 yds, 1 TD
- ARI – Larry Fitzgerald – 9 rec, 149 yds

With the loss, the Seahawks finished the season 7–9 and 3rd place in the NFC West.
