= 2011 St. Louis Rams season =

NFL team season

- Owner: Stan Kroenke
- General manager: Billy Devaney
- Head coach: Steve Spagnuolo
- Home stadium: Edward Jones Dome

Results
- Record: 2–14
- Division place: 4th NFC West
- Playoffs: Did not qualify
- Pro Bowlers: none
- Team MVP: Steven Jackson
- Team ROY: Robert Quinn

Uniform
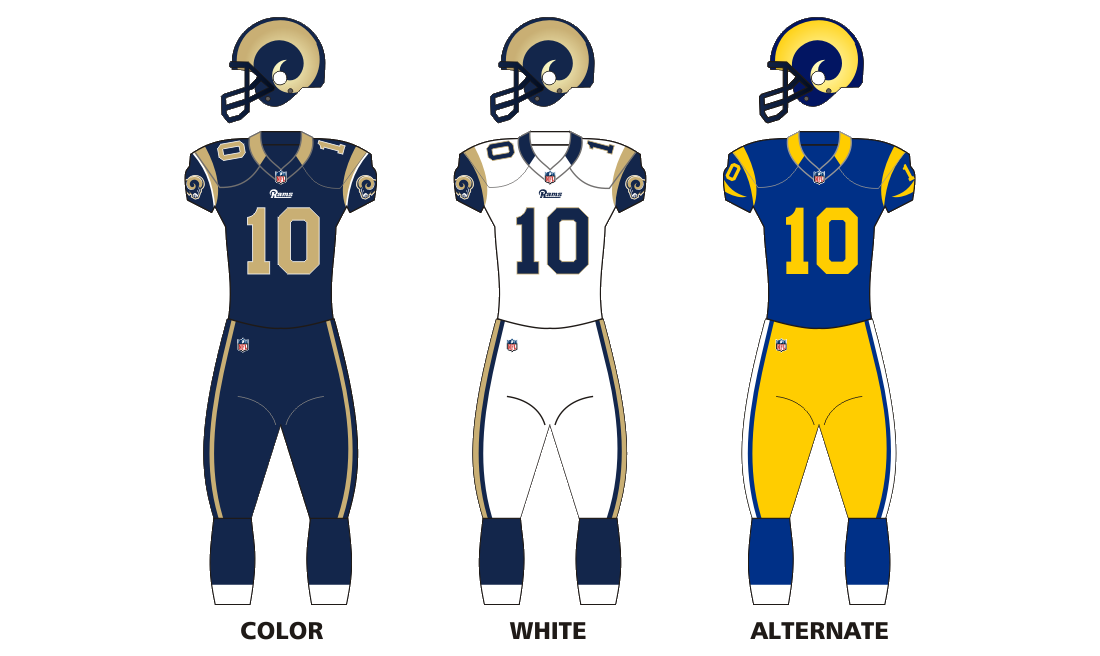

The 2011 season was the St. Louis Rams' 74th in the National Football League (NFL), their 17th in St. Louis, and their third and final season under head coach Steve Spagnuolo. They finished with a 2–14 record, a failure to improve on their 7–9 record from 2010. The day after the season finale, head coach Steve Spagnuolo and general manager Billy Devaney were fired from the team.

The Rams' offense was among the worst in the league in 2011. They scored only 193 points (12.1 points per game), last in the league, and 11th-fewest all-time for a 16-game season. Their −214-point differential was last in the league.

Football Outsiders ranked St. Louis the worst team in the league, per play, in 2011. The 2012 Football Outsiders Almanac, however, noted that the Rams went from the league's easiest schedule in 2010 to the league's hardest schedule in 2011.

With their 2–14 record, the Rams capped a stretch from 2007 to 2011 in which they went 15–65, setting a new mark for the worst five-season span in NFL history. This mark has since been matched by the Cleveland Browns of 2013 to 2017. To date, this is the last season with the Rams getting at most two victories. As of 2022, the 2011 Rams are the most recent team to finish a season scoring less than 200 points.

== Offseason ==
=== Coaching changes ===
On January 18, the Rams hired former Denver Broncos' head coach Josh McDaniels as the team's new offensive coordinator, replacing Pat Shurmur, who became the new head coach of the Cleveland Browns five days earlier (January 13).

=== Draft ===
2011 St. Louis Rams draft
Round	Pick	Player	Position	College	Notes
1	14	Robert Quinn	DE	North Carolina	
2	47	Lance Kendricks	TE	Wisconsin	
3	78	Austin Pettis	WR	Boise State	
4	112	Greg Salas	WR	Hawaii	
5	158	Jermale Hines	S	Ohio State	Pick from ATL^{[a]}
7	216	Mikail Baker	CB	Baylor	
7	228	Jabara Williams	LB	Stephen F. Austin	Pick from BAL ^{[b]}
7	229	Jonathan Nelson	S	Oklahoma	Pick from ATL ^{[a]}
Made roster † Pro Football Hall of Fame * Made at least one Pro Bowl during career

^{^[a]} The Rams traded its sixth-round selection (#145 overall) to the Atlanta Falcons in exchange for the Falcons' sixth-round selection (#158 overall) and their seventh-round selection (#229 overall).
^{^[b]} The Rams traded its sixth-round selection (#180 overall) to the Baltimore Ravens in exchange for the Ravens' seventh-round selection (#228 overall) and WR Mark Clayton.

== Staff ==
St. Louis Rams 2011 staff
Front office: Owner/chairman – Stan Kroenke; Owner/vice chairman – Chip Rosenbloom; Owner/chair of community outreach – Lucia Rodriguez; general manager – Billy Devaney; Executive vice president of football operations/coo – Kevin Demoff; Vice president of player personnel – Mike Williams; Director of player personnel – Lawrence McCutcheon; Director of college scouting – John Mancini; Head coaches: Head coach – Steve Spagnuolo; Offensive coaches: Offensive coordinator – Josh McDaniels; Running backs – Sylvester Croom; Wide receivers – Nolan Cromwell; Tight ends – Frank Leonard; Offensive line – Steve Loney; Quality control/offense – Andy Sugarman	Defensive coaches: Defensive coordinator – Ken Flajole; Defensive line – Brendan Daly; Linebackers – Paul Ferraro; Defensive backs/cornerbacks – Clayton Lopez; Defensive backs/safeties – Andre Curtis; Quality control/defense – Matt House; Special teams coaches: Special teams coordinator – Tom McMahon; Quality control/special teams – Derius Swinton; Strength and conditioning: Strength – Rock Gullickson; Assistant strength – Adam Bailey; Coaching assistants: Lou Paolillo

== Final roster ==
2011 St. Louis Rams roster
Quarterbacks (QB): 8 Sam Bradford; 12 Tom Brandstater; 10 Kellen Clemens; 4 A. J. Feeley; Running backs (RB): 41 Benjamin Guidugli FB; 39 Steven Jackson; 34 Jerious Norwood; 35 Quinn Porter KR; 33 Cadillac Williams; Wide receivers (WR): 84 Danario Alexander; 15 Dominique Curry; 11 Brandon Gibson; 83 Brandon Lloyd; 17 Nick Miller PR; Tight ends (TE): 47 Billy Bajema; 88 Lance Kendricks; 82 Mike McNeill; 81 Stephen Spach	Offensive linemen (OL): 60 Jason Brown C/G; 62 Harvey Dahl G/T; 73 Adam Goldberg T; 70 Kevin Hughes T/G; 79 Mark LeVoir T; 67 Bryan Mattison G; 72 Thomas Welch T; 64 Tony Wragge C; Defensive linemen (DL): 99 C. J. Ah You DE/DT; 95 Justin Bannan DT; 71 Gary Gibson DT; 96 James Hall DE; 91 Chris Long DE; 94 Robert Quinn DE; 98 Fred Robbins DT; 97 Darell Scott DT; 92 Eugene Sims DE	Linebackers (LB): 57 Chris Chamberlain OLB; 52 Justin Cole MLB; 50 Bryan Kehl OLB; 55 James Laurinaitis MLB; 53 David Nixon OLB; 51 Brady Poppinga OLB; Defensive backs (DB): 37 James Butler FS; 43 Craig Dahl SS; 38 Josh Gordy CB; 26 Roderick Hood CB; 21 Justin King CB; 27 Quintin Mikell FS; 30 Nate Ness CB; 36 Chris Smith CB; 20 Darian Stewart SS; Special teams (ST): 3 Josh Brown K; 5 Donnie Jones P; 44 Jake McQuaide LS	Practice squad: 90 Cornell Banks DT; 61 Tim Barnes C; 42 Kendric Burney CB; -- John Chiles WR; -- DeMarco Cosby TE; 66 John Henderson DT; 68 Ryan McKee T; 46 Chase Reynolds RB; Reserve: 16 Danny Amendola WR (IR); 24 Ron Bartell CB (IR); 63 Jacob Bell G (IR); 89 Mark Clayton WR (IR); 93 Jermelle Cudjo DT (IR); 32 Bradley Fletcher CB (IR); 31 Al Harris CB (IR); 86 Michael Hoomanawanui TE (IR); 56 Josh Hull MLB (IR); 22 Brian Jackson CB/FS (IR); 25 Marquis Johnson CB (IR); 49 Brit Miller FB (IR); 23 Jerome Murphy CB (IR); 18 Austin Pettis WR (Susp.); 76 Rodger Saffold T (IR); 87 Greg Salas WR (IR); 77 Jason Smith T (IR); Rookies in italics 53 active, 17 reserve, 8 practice squad

== Preseason ==
=== Schedule ===
The Rams' preseason schedule was announced on April 12, 2011.

Week	Date	Opponent	Result	Record	Game site	NFL.com recap
HOF	August 7	vs. Chicago Bears	Cancelled due to the 2011 NFL Lockout			
1	August 13	Indianapolis Colts	W 33–10	1–0	Edward Jones Dome	Recap
2	August 20	Tennessee Titans	W 17–16	2–0	Edward Jones Dome	Recap
3	August 26	at Kansas City Chiefs	W 14–10	3–0	Arrowhead Stadium	Recap
4	September 1	at Jacksonville Jaguars	W 24–17	4–0	EverBank Field	Recap

== Regular season ==
=== Schedule ===
Week	Date	Opponent	Result	Record	Game site	NFL.com recap
1	September 11	Philadelphia Eagles	L 13–31	0–1	Edward Jones Dome	Recap
2	September 19	at New York Giants	L 16–28	0–2	MetLife Stadium	Recap
3	September 25	Baltimore Ravens	L 7–37	0–3	Edward Jones Dome	Recap
4	October 2	Washington Redskins	L 10–17	0–4	Edward Jones Dome	Recap
5	Bye					
6	October 16	at Green Bay Packers	L 3–24	0–5	Lambeau Field	Recap
7	October 23	at Dallas Cowboys	L 7–34	0–6	Cowboys Stadium	Recap
8	October 30	New Orleans Saints	W 31–21	1–6	Edward Jones Dome	Recap
9	November 6	at Arizona Cardinals	L 13–19 (OT)	1–7	University of Phoenix Stadium	Recap
10	November 13	at Cleveland Browns	W 13–12	2–7	Cleveland Browns Stadium	Recap
11	November 20	Seattle Seahawks	L 7–24	2–8	Edward Jones Dome	Recap
12	November 27	Arizona Cardinals	L 20–23	2–9	Edward Jones Dome	Recap
13	December 4	at San Francisco 49ers	L 0–26	2–10	Candlestick Park	Recap
14	December 12	at Seattle Seahawks	L 13–30	2–11	CenturyLink Field	Recap
15	December 18	Cincinnati Bengals	L 13–20	2–12	Edward Jones Dome	Recap
16	December 24	at Pittsburgh Steelers	L 0–27	2–13	Heinz Field	Recap
17	January 1	San Francisco 49ers	L 27–34	2–14	Edward Jones Dome	Recap

=== Game summaries ===
==== Week 1: vs. Philadelphia Eagles ====
Week One: Philadelphia Eagles at St. Louis Rams – Game summary

Quarter	1	2	3	4	Total
Eagles	14	3	7	7	31
Rams	7	3	3	0	13

at Edward Jones Dome, St. Louis, Missouri

- Date: September 11
- Game time: 12:00 p.m. CDT
- Game weather: Played indoors (dome stadium)
- Game attendance: 56,722
- Referee: Gene Steratore
- TV announcers (Fox): Thom Brennaman, Brian Billick and Laura Okmin

Game information

First quarter

- STL – Steven Jackson 47-yard TD run, Josh Brown kick (STL 7–0)
- PHI – LeSean McCoy 7-yard TD pass from Michael Vick, Alex Henery kick (tied 7–7)
- PHI – Juqua Parker 56-yard fumble return for a TD, Alex Henery kick (PHI 14–7)

Second quarter

- STL – Josh Brown 49-yard field goal (PHI 14–10)
- PHI – Alex Henery 34-yard field goal (PHI 17–10)

Third quarter

- PHI – DeSean Jackson 6-yard TD pass from Michael Vick, Alex Henery kick (PHI 24–10)
- STL – Josh Brown 23-yard field goal (PHI 24–13)

Fourth quarter

- PHI – LeSean McCoy 49-yard TD run, Alex Henery kick (PHI 31–13)

Top passers

- PHI – Michael Vick: 14/32 187 Yds, 2 TD, 11 Rush, 97 Yds
- STL – Sam Bradford: 17/30 188 Yds

Top rushers

- PHI – LeSean McCoy: 15 Att, 122 Yds, 1 Rush TD, 2 Rec, 15 Yds, 1 Rec TD
- STL – Carnell Williams: 19 Att, 91 Yds, 5 Rec, 49 Yds

Top receivers

- PHI – DeSean Jackson: 6 Rec, 102 Yds, 1 TD
- STL – Brandon Gibson: 3 Rec, 50 Yds

Top tacklers

- PHI – Jamar Chaney: 6 Tackles
- STL – Craig Dahl: 8 Tackles, 1 Assist

With the loss, the Rams started the season 0–1.

==== Week 2: at New York Giants ====
Week Two: St. Louis Rams at New York Giants – Game summary

Quarter	1	2	3	4	Total
Rams	6	0	10	0	16
Giants	7	14	7	0	28

at MetLife Stadium, East Rutherford, New Jersey

- Date: September 19
- Game time: 8:30 p.m. EDT/7:30 pm. CDT
- Game weather: 60 °F (16 °C) (Clear)
- Game attendance: 78,290
- Referee: Terry McAulay
- TV announcers (ESPN): Mike Tirico, Ron Jaworski and Jon Gruden

Game information

First quarter

- STL Josh Brown 21-yard FG (9–84, 3:19) (STL 3-0)
- NYG Nicks 3-yard pass from Manning (Tynes kick) (5–38, 2:17) (NYG 7-3)
- STL Brown 25-yard FG (10–67, 2:26) (NYG 7-6)

Second quarter

- NYG Boley 65-yard fumble return (Tynes kick) (NYG 14-6)
- NYG Hixon 22-yard pass from Manning (Tynes kick) (8–86, 2:37) (NYG 21-6)

Third quarter

- STL Brown 27-yard FG (8–60, 3:11) (NYG 21-9)
- NYG Jacobs 9-yard run (Tynes kick) (10–81, 5:30) (NYG 28-9)
- STL Alexander 19-yard pass from Bradford (Brown kick) (13–72, 5:01) (NYG 28-16)

Top passers

- STL – Sam Bradford – 22/46, 331 YDS, TD
- NYG – Eli Manning – 18/29, 200 YDS, 2 TD, INT

Top rushers

- STL – Cadillac Williams – 13 CAR, 36 YDS
- NYG – Ahmad Bradshaw – 15 CAR, 59 YDS

Top receivers

- STL – Danario Alexander – 3 REC, 122 YDS, TD
- NYG – Mario Manningham – 3 REC, 56 YDS

Top tacklers

- STL – James Laurinaitis – 9 TKL, 5 AST
- NYG – Antrel Rolle – 8 TKL, AST

With the loss, the Rams fell to 0–2.

==== Week 3: vs. Baltimore Ravens ====
Week Three: Baltimore Ravens at St. Louis Rams – Game summary

Quarter	1	2	3	4	Total
Ravens	21	6	3	7	37
Rams	0	0	7	0	7

at Edward Jones Dome, St. Louis, Missouri

- Date: September 25
- Game time: 3:05 pm. CDT
- Game weather: Played indoors (dome stadium)
- Game attendance: 56,289
- Referee: Scott Green
- TV announcers (CBS): Kevin Harlan and Solomon Wilcots

Game information

First quarter

- BAL – Torrey Smith 74 yd. pass from Joe Flacco (Billy Cundiff kick), Ravens 7–0
- BAL – Torrey Smith 41 yd. pass from Joe Flacco (Billy Cundiff kick), Ravens 14–0
- BAL – Torrey Smith 18 yd. pass from Joe Flacco (Billy Cundiff kick), Ravens 21–0

Second quarter

- BAL – Billy Cundiff 21 yd. Field Goal, Ravens 24–0
- BAL – Billy Cundiff 31 yd. Field Goal, Ravens 27–0

Third quarter

- BAL – Billy Cundiff 38 yd. Field Goal, Ravens 30–0
- STL – Brandon Gibson 34 yd. pass from Sam Bradford (Josh Brown kick), Ravens 30–7

Fourth quarter

- BAL – Haloti Ngata 28 yd. fumble return, Ravens 37–7

Top passers

- BAL – Joe Flacco – 27/48, 389 yards, 3 touchdowns
- STL – Sam Bradford – 16/32, 166 yards, 1 touchdown, 1 interception

Top rushers

- BAL – Ray Rice – 9 carries, 81 yards
- STL – Carnell Williams – 18 carries, 75 yards

Top receivers

- BAL – Anquan Bolden – 7 receptions, 74 yards
- STL – Brandon Gibson – 5 receptions, 55 yards, 1 touchdown

Top tacklers

- BAL – Ray Lewis – 10 tackles
- STL – Bradley Fletcher – 6 tackles

With the loss, the Rams fell to 0–3.

==== Week 4: vs. Washington Redskins ====
Week Four: Washington Redskins at St. Louis Rams – Game summary

Quarter	1	2	3	4	Total
Redskins	7	7	3	0	17
Rams	0	0	0	10	10

at Edward Jones Dome, St. Louis, Missouri

- Date: October 2
- Game time: 12:00 pm. CDT
- Game weather: Played indoors (dome stadium)
- Game attendance: 56,113
- Referee: Walt Coleman
- TV announcers (Fox): Chris Myers & Tim Ryan

Game information

First quarter

Second quarter

Third quarter

Fourth quarter

Top passers

- WAS –
- STL –

Top rushers

- WAS –
- STL –

Top receivers

- WAS –
- STL –

Top tacklers

- WAS –
- STL –

With the loss, the Rams went into their bye week at 0–4.

==== Week 6: at Green Bay Packers ====
Week Six: St. Louis Rams at Green Bay Packers – Game summary

Quarter	1	2	3	4	Total
Rams	0	3	0	0	3
Packers	3	21	0	0	24

at Lambeau Field, Green Bay, Wisconsin

- Date: October 16
- Game time: 12:00 pm. CDT
- Game weather: 57 °F (14 °C) (Partly Cloudy)
- Game attendance: 70,604
- Referee: Ed Hochuli
- TV announcers (Fox): Chris Myers and Tim Ryan

Game information

First quarter

- GB – Mason Crosby 32 yd FG, 6:57 (GB 3–0)

Second quarter

- GB – James Jones 35 yd TD pass from Aaron Rodgers, Mason Crosby XP is good, 14:00 (GB 10–0)
- GB – Jordy Nelson 93 yd TD pass from Aaron Rodgers, Mason Crosby XP is good, 9:24 (GB 17–0)
- GB – Donald Driver 7 yd TD pass from Aaron Rodgers, Mason Crosby XP is good, 1:56 (GB 24–0)
- STL – Josh Brown 36 yd FG, 00:07 (GB 24–3)

Third quarter

- No scoring plays

Fourth quarter

- No scoring plays

Top passers

- STL – Sam Bradford – 29/45, 328 yards, 0 TD, 1 INT
- GB – Aaron Rodgers – 18/29, 316 yards, 3 TD, 1 INT

Top rushers

- STL – Steven Jackson – 18 rushes, 96 yards
- GB – James Starks – 13 rushes, 49 yards

Top receivers

- STL – Danario Alexander – 6 receptions, 91 yards
- GB – Jordy Nelson – 2 receptions, 104 yards, 1 TD

Top tacklers

- STL – Chris Chamberlain – 6 tackles
- GB – Desmond Bishop – 9 tackles

Coming off of their bye week in week 5, the Rams traveled to Lambeau Field to take on the undefeated Packers. The loss dropped the team to 0–5.

==== Week 7: at Dallas Cowboys ====
Week Seven: St. Louis Rams at Dallas Cowboys – Game summary

Quarter	1	2	3	4	Total
Rams	0	7	0	0	7
Cowboys	7	10	3	14	34

at Cowboys Stadium, Arlington, Texas

- Date: October 23
- Game time: 3:15 pm. CDT
- Game weather: Played indoors (retractable roof closed)
- Game attendance: 80,086
- Referee: Alberto Riveron
- TV announcers (Fox): Dick Stockton and John Lynch

Game information

First quarter

- DAL - DeMarco Murray - 91-yard run

Second quarter

- DAL - Jason Witten - 1-yard pass from Tony Romo
- STL - Steven Jackson - 6-yard run
- DAL - Dan Bailey 30-yard field goal

Third quarter

- DAL - Dan Bailey 51-yard field goal

Fourth quarter

- DAL - Phillip Tanner 6-yard run
- DAL - Dez Bryant 20-yard pass from Tony Romo

Top passers

- STL – AJ Feeley
- DAL –Tony Romo

Top rushers

- STL – Steven Jackson
- DAL – DeMarco Murray

Top receivers

- STL – Brandon Lloyd
- DAL – Dez Bryant

Top tacklers

- STL – Quintin Mikell
- DAL – Abram Elam

With the loss, the Rams dropped to 0–6.

==== Week 8: vs. New Orleans Saints ====
Week Eight: New Orleans Saints at St. Louis Rams – Game summary

Quarter	1	2	3	4	Total
Saints	0	0	7	14	21
Rams	0	17	7	7	31

at Edward Jones Dome, St. Louis, Missouri

- Date: October 30
- Game time: 12:00 pm. CDT
- Game weather: Played indoors (dome stadium)
- Game attendance: 57,179
- Referee: Walt Anderson
- TV announcers (Fox): Chris Myers and Tim Ryan

Game information

First quarter

- No scoring plays.

Second quarter

- STL – Josh Brown 38-yard field goal. Rams 3–0. Drive: 14 plays, 68 yards, 5:41.
- STL – Steven Jackson 3-yard run (Josh Brown kick). Rams 10–0. Drive: 2 plays, 15 yards, 0:26.
- STL – Brandon Lloyd 8-yard pass from A. J. Feeley (Josh Brown kick). Rams 17–0. Drive: 7 plays, 38 yards, 0:41.

Third quarter

- STL – Steven Jackson 3-yard run (Josh Brown kick). Rams 24–0. Drive: 11 plays, 73 yards, 5:44.
- NO – Jonathan Vilma fumble recovery in the end zone (John Kasay kick). Saints 7–24.

Fourth quarter

- NO – Pierre Thomas 3-yard run (J. Kasay kick). Saints 14–24. Drive: 10 plays, 68 yards, 4:45.
- STL – Darian Stewart 27-yard interception return (Josh Brown kick). Rams 31–14.
- NO – Lance Moore 8-yard pass from Drew Brees (John Kasay kick). Saints 21–31. Drive: 15 plays, 80 yards, 2:45.

Top passers

- NO – Drew Brees – 30/44, 269 yards, TD, 2 INT
- STL – A. J. Feeley – 20/37, 175 yards, TD

Top rushers

- NO – Pierre Thomas – 7 rushes, 23 yards, TD
- STL – Steven Jackson – 25 rushes, 159 yards, 2 TD

Top receivers

- NO – Lance Moore – 7 receptions, 74 yards, TD
- STL – Brandon Lloyd – 6 receptions, 53 yards, TD

This home game for the team also had a celebration of the St. Louis Cardinals showing off the World Series trophy. The Rams would then go on to win this game and improve to 1–6.

==== Week 9: at Arizona Cardinals ====
Week Nine: St. Louis Rams at Arizona Cardinals – Game summary

Quarter	1	2	3	4	OT	Total
Rams	3	6	4	0	0	13
Cardinals	3	0	3	7	6	19

at University of Phoenix Stadium, Glendale, Arizona

- Date: November 6
- Game time: 3:15 pm. CST/2:15 p.m. MST
- Game weather: Played indoors (retractable roof closed)
- Game attendance: 60,628
- Referee: Ron Winter
- TV announcers (Fox): Sam Rosen and Chad Pennington

Game information

First quarter

Second quarter

Third quarter

Fourth quarter

Top passers

- STL –
- ARI –

Top rushers

- STL –
- ARI –

Top receivers

- STL –
- ARI –

Top tacklers

- STL –
- ARI –

The game featured the Rams' scoring the four points in the third quarter as they got two safeties on consecutive drives. This was first time in NFL history that a team had recorded four points in a quarter.

With the loss, the Rams fell to 1–7 and last place in the NFC West.

==== Week 10: at Cleveland Browns ====
Week Ten: St. Louis Rams at Cleveland Browns – Game summary

Quarter	1	2	3	4	Total
Rams	0	10	0	3	13
Browns	3	6	3	0	12

at Cleveland Browns Stadium, Cleveland, Ohio

- Date: November 13
- Game time: 1:00 pm. EST/12:00 pm. CST
- Game weather: 60 °F (16 °C) (Dry / Windy Gusting to Gale Force)
- Game attendance: 64,900
- Referee: Clete Blakeman
- TV announcers (Fox): Ron Pitts, Jim Mora, Jr. and Drea Avent

Game information

First quarter

Second quarter

Third quarter

Fourth quarter

Top passers

- STL –
- CLE –

Top rushers

- STL –
- CLE –

Top receivers

- STL –
- CLE –

Top tacklers

- STL –
- CLE –

With the close win, the Rams improved to 2–7.

==== Week 11: vs. Seattle Seahawks ====
Week Eleven: Seattle Seahawks at St. Louis Rams – Game summary

Quarter	1	2	3	4	Total
Seahawks	0	10	7	7	24
Rams	7	0	0	0	7

at Edward Jones Dome, St. Louis, Missouri

- Date: November 20
- Game time: 3:05 pm. CST
- Game weather: Played indoors (dome stadium)
- Game attendance: 56,400
- Referee: Carl Cheffers
- TV announcers (Fox): Chris Myers, Tim Ryan and Jaime Maggio

Game information

First quarter

- STL – Brandon Lloyd 30-yard pass from Sam Bradford (Josh Brown kick), 9:15 (STL 7–0)

Second quarter

- SEA – Sidney Rice 14-yard pass from Tarvaris Jackson (Steven Hauschka kick), 8:36 (Tied 7–7)
- SEA – Steven Hauschka 19-yard field goal, 0:00 (SEA 10–7)

Third quarter

- SEA – Marshawn Lynch 3-yard run (Steven Hauschka kick), 5:58 (SEA 17–7)

Fourth quarter

- SEA – Justin Forsett 22-yard run (Steven Hauschka kick), 4:21 (SEA 24–7)

Top passers

- SEA – Tarvaris Jackson: 14/24, 148 yds, 1 TD, 2 INT
- STL – Sam Bradford: 20/40, 181 yds, 1 TD, 1 INT

Top rushers

- SEA – Marshawn Lynch: 27 car, 88 yds, 1 TD
- STL – Steven Jackson: 15 car, 42 yds

Top receivers

- SEA – Mike Williams: 2 rec, 62 yds
- STL – Brandon Lloyd: 5 rec, 67 yds, 1 TD

Top tacklers

- SEA – Richard Sherman: 5 solo, 2 pd
- SEA – Chris Clemons: 3 solo, 2 asst, 3 sacks, pd, 2 ff
- STL – James Laurinaitis, 13 solo, tfl

Team – pass – rush – total – to

- SEA – 126 – 163 – 289 – 2
- STL – 143 – 42 – 185 – 3

With the loss, the Rams dropped to 2–8.

==== Week 12: vs. Arizona Cardinals ====
Week Twelve: Arizona Cardinals at St. Louis Rams – Game summary

Quarter	1	2	3	4	Total
Cardinals	3	0	17	3	23
Rams	7	3	0	10	20

at Edward Jones Dome, St. Louis, Missouri

- Date: November 27
- Game time: 12:00 pm. CST
- Game weather: Played indoors (dome stadium)
- Game attendance: 56,029
- Referee: Mike Carey
- TV announcers (Fox): Sam Rosen, Chad Pennington and Tina Cervasio

Game information

First quarter

Second quarter

Third quarter

Fourth quarter

Top passers

- ARI –
- STL –

Top rushers

- ARI –
- STL –

Top receivers

- ARI –
- STL –

Top tacklers

- ARI –
- STL –

With the loss, the Rams dropped to 2–9 securing them their 5th straight losing season.

==== Week 13: at San Francisco 49ers ====
Week Thirteen: St. Louis Rams at San Francisco 49ers – Game summary

Quarter	1	2	3	4	Total
Rams	0	0	0	0	0
49ers	3	6	10	7	26

at Candlestick Park, San Francisco, California

- Date: December 4
- Game time: 3:15 pm. CST/1:15 p.m. PST
- Game weather: 53 °F (12 °C) (Sunny)
- Game attendance: 69,732
- Referee: Pete Morelli
- TV announcers (Fox): Chris Myers and Tim Ryan

Game information

First quarter

- SF – David Akers 36-yard field goal, 49ers 3–0.

Second quarter

- SF – David Akers 19-yard field goal, 49ers 6–0.
- SF – David Akers 28-yard field goal, 49ers 9–0.

Third quarter

- SF – Michael Crabtree 52-yard pass from Alex Smith (David Akers kick), 49ers 16–0.
- SF – David Akers 34-yard field goal, 49ers 19–0.

Fourth quarter

- SF – Kyle Williams 56-yard pass from Alex Smith (David Akers kick), 49ers 26–0.

Top passers

- STL – A.J. Feeley – 12/22, 156 yards, 1 interception
- SF – Alex Smith – 17/23, 274 yards, 2 touchdown

Top rushers

- STL – Steven Jackson – 10 carries, 19 yards
- SF – Frank Gore – 21 carries, 73 yards

Top receivers

- STL – Brandon Gibson – 4 catches, 42 yards
- SF – Michael Crabtree – 4 catches, 96 yards, 1 touchdown

Top tacklers

- STL – Craig Dehl – 11 tackles, 2 assists
- SF – NaVarro Bowman – 6 tackles

With the loss, the Rams fell to 2–10.

==== Week 14: at Seattle Seahawks ====
Week Fourteen: St. Louis Rams at Seattle Seahawks – Game summary

Quarter	1	2	3	4	Total
Rams	0	3	3	7	13
Seahawks	10	0	10	10	30

at CenturyLink Field, Seattle, Washington

- Date: December 12
- Game time: 7:30 pm. CST/5:30 pm. PST
- Game weather: 40 °F (4 °C) (Clear)
- Game attendance: 66,577
- Referee: Bill Leavy
- TV announcers (ESPN): Mike Tirico, Ron Jaworski, Jon Gruden and Rachel Nichols

Game information

First quarter

- SEA – Michael Robinson 17-yard blocked punt return (Steven Hauschka kick), 9:57 (SEA 7–0)
- SEA – Steven Hauschka 42-yard field goal, 1:35 (SEA 10–0)

Second quarter

- STL – Josh Brown 46-yard field goal, 11:04 (SEA 10–3)

Third quarter

- SEA – Steven Hauschka 23-yard field goal, 12:03 (SEA 13–3)
- STL – Josh Brown 29-yard field goal, 1:49 (SEA 13–6)
- SEA – Doug Baldwin 29-yard pass from Tarvaris Jackson (Steven Hauschka kick), 0:06 (SEA 20–6)

Fourth quarter

- SEA – Steven Hauschka 28-yard field goal, 8:27 (SEA 23–6)
- STL – Steven Jackson 1-yard run (Josh Brown kick), 4:39 (SEA 23–13)
- SEA – Marshawn Lynch 16-yard run (Steven Hauschka kick), 2:57 (SEA 30–13)

Top passers

- STL – Sam Bradford: 12/29, 193 yds, 1 INT
- SEA – Tarvaris Jackson: 21/32, 224 yds, 1 TD

Top rushers

- STL – Steven Jackson: 20 car, 63 yds, 1 TD
- SEA – Marshawn Lynch: 23 car, 115 yds, 1 TD

Top receivers

- STL – Brandon Lloyd: 5 rec, 82 yds
- SEA – Doug Baldwin: 7 rec, 93 yds, 1 TD

Top tacklers

- STL – James Laurinaitis, 7 solo, 5 asst, tfl, pd
- SEA – David Hawthorne, 5 solo, 5 asst, tfl

Team – pass – rush – total – to

- STL – 167 – 114 – 281 – 1
- SEA – 214 – 145 – 359 – 1

With the loss, the Rams fell to 2–11 and were swept by the Seahawks for the first time since 2009.

==== Week 15: vs. Cincinnati Bengals ====
Week Fifteen: Cincinnati Bengals at St. Louis Rams – Game summary

Quarter	1	2	3	4	Total
Bengals	3	0	10	7	20
Rams	0	6	0	7	13

at Edward Jones Dome, St. Louis, Missouri

- Date: December 18
- Game time: 12:00 pm. CST
- Game weather: Played indoors (dome stadium)
- Game attendance: 56,431
- Referee: Jerome Boger
- TV announcers (CBS): Greg Gumbel and Dan Dierdorf

Game information

First quarter

Second quarter

Third quarter

Fourth quarter

Top passers

- CIN –
- STL –

Top rushers

- CIN –
- STL –

Top receivers

- CIN –
- STL –

Top tacklers

- CIN –
- STL –

With the loss, the Rams fell to 2–12.

==== Week 16: at Pittsburgh Steelers ====
Week Sixteen: St. Louis Rams at Pittsburgh Steelers – Game summary

Quarter	1	2	3	4	Total
Rams	0	0	0	0	0
Steelers	3	7	3	14	27

at Heinz Field, Pittsburgh, Pennsylvania

- Date: December 24
- Game time: 1:00 pm. EST/12:00 pm. CST
- Game weather: 36 °F (2 °C) (Cloudy)
- Game attendance: 60,081
- Referee: Clete Blakeman
- TV announcers (Fox): Dick Stockton & John Lynch

Game information

First quarter

- Steelers 3–0 – Shaun Suisham 21 Yard Field Goal (4:43)

Second quarter

- Steelers 10–0 – John Clay 10 Yard Run (Shaun Suisham Kick) (6:50)

Third quarter

- Steelers 13–0 – Shaun Suisham 49 Yard Field Goal (9:19)

Fourth quarter

- Steelers 20–0 – Rashard Mendenhall 1 Yard Run (Shaun Suisham Kick) (8:58)
- Steelers 27–0 – Isaac Redman 2 Yard Run (Shaun Suisham Kick) (3:14)

Top passers

- STL – Kellen Clemens – 9/24, 91 Yards
- PIT – Charlie Batch – 15/22, 208 Yards, INT

Top rushers

- STL – Steven Jackson – 24 Rushes, 103 Yards
- PIT – Rashard Mendenhall – 18 Rushes, 116 Yards, TD

Top receivers

- STL – Brandon Lloyd – 3 Receptions, 29 Yards
- PIT – Mike Wallace – 4 Receptions, 82 Yards

Top tacklers

- STL – James Laurinaitis – 7 tackles, 6 assists
- PIT – Lawrence Timmons – 7 tackles, 3 assists

This game became the Steelers' 2nd shutout win of the season as the Rams dropped to 2–13.

==== Week 17: vs. San Francisco 49ers ====
Week Seventeen: San Francisco 49ers at St. Louis Rams – Game summary

Quarter	1	2	3	4	Total
49ers	7	13	7	7	34
Rams	7	0	3	17	27

at Edward Jones Dome, St. Louis, Missouri

- Date: January 1
- Game time: 12:00 pm. CST
- Game weather: Played indoors (dome stadium)
- Game attendance: 55,990
- Referee: Jeff Triplette
- TV announcers (Fox): Chris Myers, Tim Ryan, & Jaime Maggio

Game information

First quarter

Second quarter

Third quarter

Fourth quarter

Top passers

- SF –
- STL –

Top rushers

- SF –
- STL –

Top receivers

- SF –
- STL –

Top tacklers

- SF –
- STL –

With the loss, the Rams finished the season at 2–14 tied with the Colts for the league's worst record.

=== Standings ===
NFC West
	W	L	T	PCT	DIV	CONF	PF	PA	STK
^{(2)} San Francisco 49ers	13	3	0	.813	5–1	10–2	380	229	W3
Arizona Cardinals	8	8	0	.500	4–2	7–5	312	348	W1
Seattle Seahawks	7	9	0	.438	3–3	6–6	321	315	L2
St. Louis Rams	2	14	0	.125	0–6	1–11	193	407	L7
