= David Hawthorne =

American football player (born 1985)

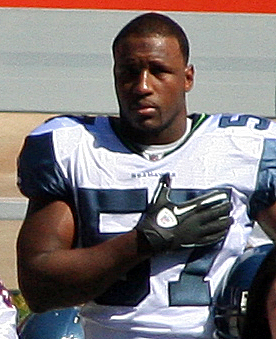
- Hawthorne with the Seattle Seahawks in 2010

No. 59, 57, 56
- Position: Linebacker

Personal information
- Born: May 14, 1985 (age 41); Corsicana, Texas, U.S.
- Listed height: 6 ft 0 in (1.83 m)
- Listed weight: 246 lb (112 kg)

Career information
- High school: Corsicana
- College: TCU
- NFL draft: 2008: undrafted

Career history
- Seattle Seahawks (2008–2011); New Orleans Saints (2012–2015); Buffalo Bills (2016)*
- * Offseason or practice squad member only

Career NFL statistics
- Total tackles: 595
- Sacks: 12
- Forced fumbles: 9
- Fumble recoveries: 3
- Interceptions: 8
- Defensive touchdowns: 1
- Stats at Pro Football Reference

David Hawthorne (born May 14, 1985) is an American former professional football player who was a linebacker in the National Football League (NFL). He was signed by the Seattle Seahawks as an undrafted free agent in 2008. He played college football for the TCU Horned Frogs.

== Professional career ==
Pre-draft measurables
Height	Weight	40-yard dash	10-yard split	20-yard split	20-yard shuttle	Three-cone drill	Vertical jump	Broad jump	Bench press
6 ft 0 in (1.83 m)	240 lb (109 kg)	4.69 s	1.60 s	2.71 s	4.45 s	7.27 s	37 1/2 in (0.95 m)	8 ft 10 in (2.69 m)	20 reps
All values from Texas Christian's Pro Day

=== Seattle Seahawks ===
Hawthorne received his first start ever in Week 3 of the 2009 season in place of the injured Lofa Tatupu. Hawthorne recorded a combined 16 tackles and 1 interception. Tatupu then returned from injury but was shortly fallen again, this time being sidelined for the season. Hawthorne started from Week 8 for the rest of the 2009 season and recorded 117 tackles, 4 sacks, 2 forced fumbles and 3 interceptions.

On December 1, 2011, he returned an interception 77 yards for a touchdown against the Philadelphia Eagles in the 4th quarter.

=== New Orleans Saints ===
Hawthorne signed a five-year $19 Million contract with the New Orleans Saints on April 3, 2012. He was released on February 8, 2016.

=== Buffalo Bills ===
On August 7, 2016, Hawthorne signed with the Buffalo Bills. On August 30, 2016, he was waived by the Bills.

== NFL career statistics ==
Legend
**Bold**	Career high

=== Regular season ===
Year	Team	Games		Tackles					Interceptions					Fumbles			
Year	Team	GP	GS	Cmb	Solo	Ast	Sck	TFL	Int	Yds	TD	Lng	PD	FF	FR	Yds	TD
2008	SEA	14	0	12	11	1	0.0	0	0	0	0	0	0	0	0	0	0
2009	SEA	**16**	11	**117**	**94**	23	**4.0**	**10**	**3**	9	0	5	5	1	**1**	**36**	0
2010	SEA	**16**	**16**	106	75	31	0.0	3	1	5	0	5	4	**2**	**1**	0	0
2011	SEA	15	14	115	73	**42**	2.0	9	**3**	**111**	**1**	**77**	**6**	0	**1**	9	0
2012	NOR	11	10	38	22	16	0.0	4	0	0	0	0	1	0	0	0	0
2013	NOR	**16**	15	91	60	31	3.0	8	0	0	0	0	0	1	0	0	0
2014	NOR	12	12	83	52	31	3.0	7	1	10	0	10	3	0	0	0	0
2015	NOR	11	5	33	20	13	0.0	0	0	0	0	0	0	**2**	0	0	0
		111	83	595	407	188	12.0	41	8	135	1	77	19	6	3	45	0

=== Playoffs ===
Year	Team	Games		Tackles					Interceptions					Fumbles			
Year	Team	GP	GS	Cmb	Solo	Ast	Sck	TFL	Int	Yds	TD	Lng	PD	FF	FR	Yds	TD
2010	SEA	**2**	**2**	**18**	**14**	4	0.0	0	0	0	0	0	**1**	0	**1**	0	0
2013	NOR	**2**	**2**	15	10	**5**	0.0	0	0	0	0	0	0	0	0	0	0
		4	4	33	24	9	0.0	0	0	0	0	0	1	0	1	0	0
