= Mike Morgan (linebacker, born 1988) =

American football player (born 1988)

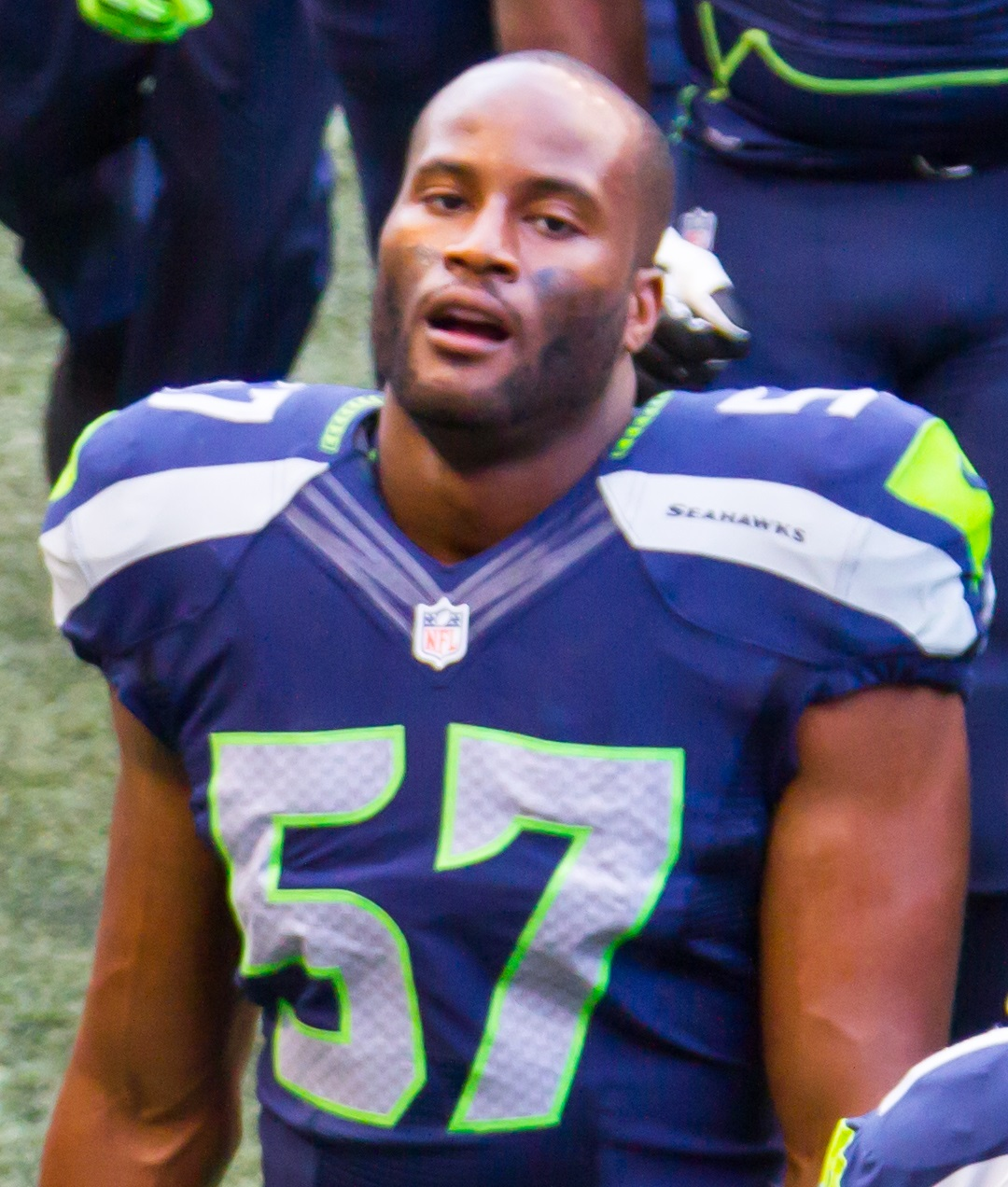
- Morgan with the Seattle Seahawks in 2014

No. 48, 57
- Position: Linebacker

Personal information
- Born: January 16, 1988 (age 38); Dallas, Texas, U.S.
- Listed height: 6 ft 3 in (1.91 m)
- Listed weight: 235 lb (107 kg)

Career information
- High school: Skyline (Dallas)
- College: USC
- NFL draft: 2011: undrafted

Career history
- Seattle Seahawks (2011–2016)

Awards and highlights
- Super Bowl champion (XLVIII)

Career NFL statistics
- Total tackles: 69
- Sacks: 1
- Interceptions: 1
- Stats at Pro Football Reference

Michael Cantrel Morgan (born January 16, 1988) is an American former professional football player who was a linebacker in the National Football League (NFL). He was signed by the Seattle Seahawks as an undrafted free agent in 2011. He played college football for the USC Trojans.

== Early life ==
Morgan attended Skyline High School, where he played high school football. As a senior, he had 203 tackles and 10 sacks. In 2004, he had 98 tackles, 18 sacks and seven forced fumbles.

== College career ==
Morgan was redshirted as a freshman in 2006, sidelined with a back sprain. In 2007 Morgan was a backup and spent time on special teams. He finished the year with nine tackles in 12 games. As a sophomore in 2008, he again spent time as a backup and on special teams. He finished the season with 24 tackles and a sack in 12 games. Morgan took over as the team's starting outside linebacker in 2009.

== Professional career ==
Morgan went undrafted in the 2011 NFL draft but was later signed by the Seattle Seahawks. He was released during final roster cuts on September 3, 2011. He made his first career start against the New York Jets on November 11.

On March 19, 2016, Morgan signed a new contract with the Seattle Seahawks that would keep him in Seattle for the 2016 season. He was placed on injured reserve on October 3, 2016, with a sports hernia. He was activated off injured reserve on December 3, 2016, prior to Week 13. On December 4, 2016, Morgan made his season debut in a Sunday night matchup against the Carolina Panthers. On the first defensive play for the Seahawks, Morgan recorded his first career interception on a pass thrown by Derek Anderson.

On July 31, 2017, Morgan re-signed with the Seattle Seahawks. He was released on September 2, 2017.
