= 2010 Seattle Seahawks season =

American football team season

- Owner: Paul Allen
- General manager: John Schneider
- Head coach: Pete Carroll
- Offensive coordinator: Jeremy Bates
- Defensive coordinator: Gus Bradley
- Home stadium: Qwest Field

Results
- Record: 7–9
- Division place: 1st NFC West
- Playoffs: Won Wild Card Playoffs (vs. Saints) 41–36; Lost Divisional Playoffs (at Bears) 24–35
- All-Pros: KR Leon Washington (2nd team)
- Pro Bowlers: None

The 2010 season was the Seattle Seahawks' 35th in the National Football League (NFL), their ninth playing home games at Qwest Field and their first under head coach Pete Carroll after Jim Mora was fired on January 8, 2010. The team exceeded their win total from 2009 and won the NFC West with a 7–9 record, and made the playoffs for the first time since 2007. They became the first team in a full season to finish with a sub-.500 record and make the playoffs, a berth which was by virtue of winning the division. The 2010 Seahawks also became the first sub-.500 team to win a playoff game with their home win against the defending Super Bowl champion New Orleans Saints remembered as the Beast Quake game, but then had their season ended by the second-seeded Chicago Bears in the divisional round.

Statistics website Football Outsiders calculated that the 2010 Seahawks were the worst team that they had ever rated to qualify for the playoffs.

== Offseason ==
=== Front office changes ===
General manager Tim Ruskell resigned from his position two weeks before the 2009 regular season ended. Interim general manager Ruston Webster took over until the season ended, but was not retained as general manager. However, Webster left the team for a similar position for the Tennessee Titans instead.

Surprisingly, the head coaching vacancy created by Mora's departure was actually filled first by the Seahawks through Pete Carroll. Seahawks CEO Tod Leiweke suggested that Carroll and the general manager would have a "collaborative relationship" over control of the team.

Among candidates interviewed for general manager were former Tennessee Titans General Manager Floyd Reese and New York Giants scouting director Marc Ross. On January 19, 2010, the Seahawks officially signed Green Bay Packers director of football operations John Schneider as their official General Manager.

=== Staff changes ===
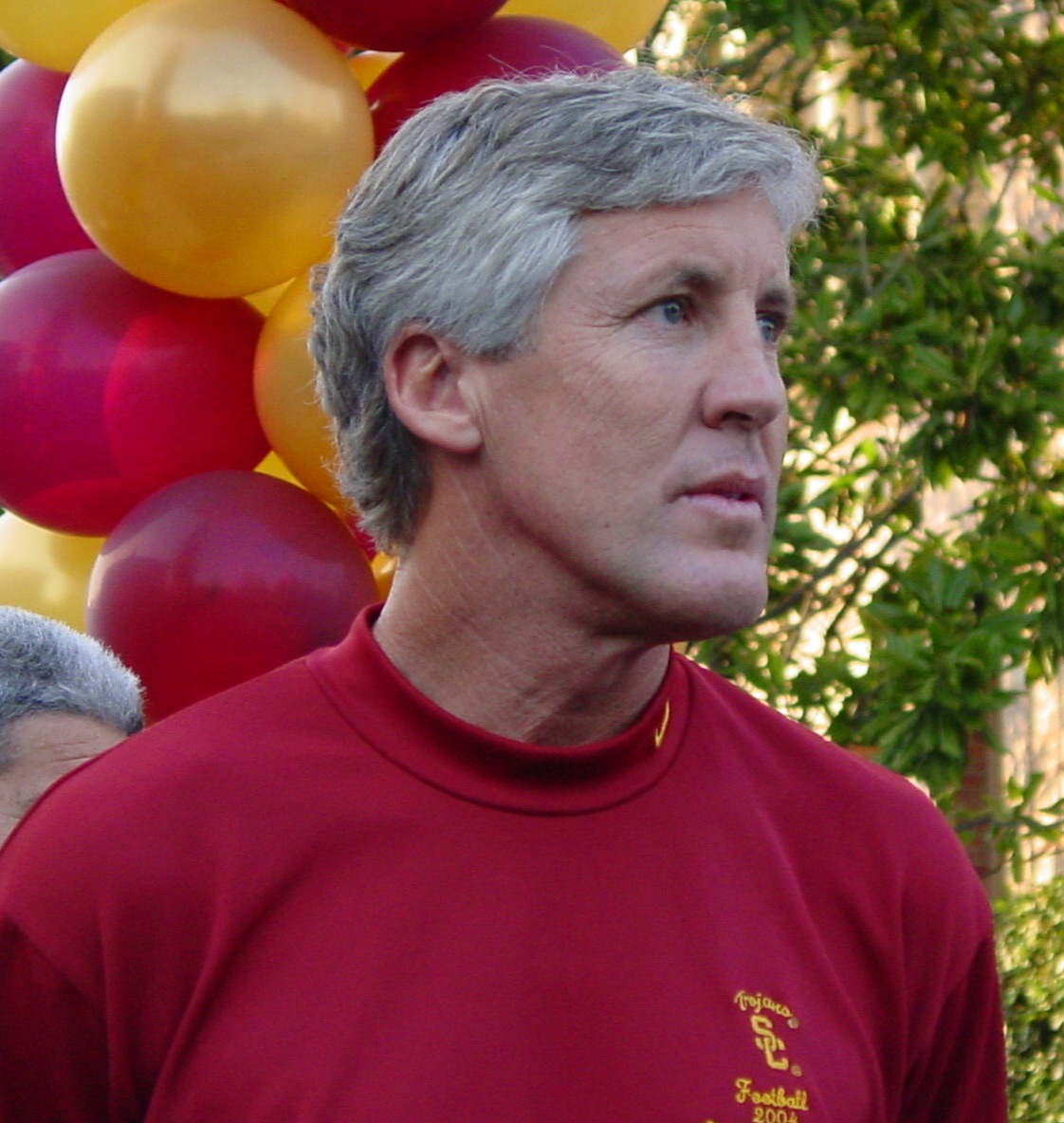
Carroll returned to the NFL as the 8th head coach in Seahawks history

We're going to compete like crazy. Maybe like you've never seen. And I hope that will be the theme that will rise to us and that will be the most important part of it, because we are in the most competitive world that you can be in the NFL. I can't wait to get this thing underway. I can't wait to get it started.

— Pete Carroll, speaking from his introductory press conference as Seahawks Head Coach.

Following a disastrous 5–11 season in his first season with the Seahawks, Jim Mora was fired on January 8, 2010. Mora was apparently surprised and disappointed about the news, but Seahawks CEO Tod Leiweke stated that the franchise was moving to a new direction to become successful.

Within days after Mora was relieved as Head Coach, the Seahawks began to interview candidates such as USC Trojans football head coach Pete Carroll, Minnesota Vikings defensive coordinator Leslie Frazier and San Diego Chargers defensive coordinator Ron Rivera. Controversy arose when news broke out that Carroll was in preliminary agreements to sign a contract as head coach and have full control of the franchise when neither Frazier nor Rivera were interviewed, thus potentially breaking the Rooney Rule, however Frazier agreed to an interview before the Seahawks signed Carroll as coach, thus fulfilling the rule. Two days later, Carroll officially became the 8th head coach in franchise history.

Within days after Carroll was hired, the rest of the coaching staff was revamped. With the exceptions of Gus Bradley and Dan Quinn, none of the coaches from Mora's tenure returned. USC Football offensive coordinator Jeremy Bates joined as the Seahawks offensive coordinator, while Alex Gibbs from the Houston Texans would serve as offensive line coach and assistant head coach. Weeks before the start of the NFL regular season, however, Gibbs would suddenly retire from the position, with Carroll's former USC assistant Pat Ruel taking his spot.

=== Key departures ===
Wide receiver Nate Burleson, after a four-year stint with the Seahawks, signed with the Detroit Lions on March 5, 2010, after 24 hours of free agency. Backup quarterback Seneca Wallace, known for his versatility as a wide receiver, was sent to the Cleveland Browns on March 8, 2010 in exchange for a conditional 2011 NFL Draft pick.

Guard Rob Sims, who started regularly for the Seahawks for the past four years, was traded to the Lions in exchange for defensive end Robert Henderson and a fifth-round pick in the 2010 NFL draft. Veteran defensive End Darryl Tapp was also traded to the Philadelphia Eagles in exchange for Chris Clemons and a fourth-round pick.

On April 13, 2010, Defensive end Patrick Kerney announced his retirement after 11 NFL seasons. Kerney made the Pro Bowl in 2007 and led the team in sacks on two occasions (2007 and 2009). On April 29, 2010, Four-time All-Pro Left Tackle Walter Jones also announced his retirement after a 13-year career during which he became a cornerstone of the Seattle Seahawks organization.

During training camp, the Seahawks continued to cut ties with many players. Former first-round pick Lawrence Jackson, who Carroll coached with at USC, was traded to the Detroit Lions for a sixth-round pick. The previous year's starters including fullback Owen Schmitt and wide receiver T. J. Houshmandzadeh were released from the team. Defensive back Josh Wilson was traded to Baltimore for a conditional fifth-round pick.

=== Key additions ===
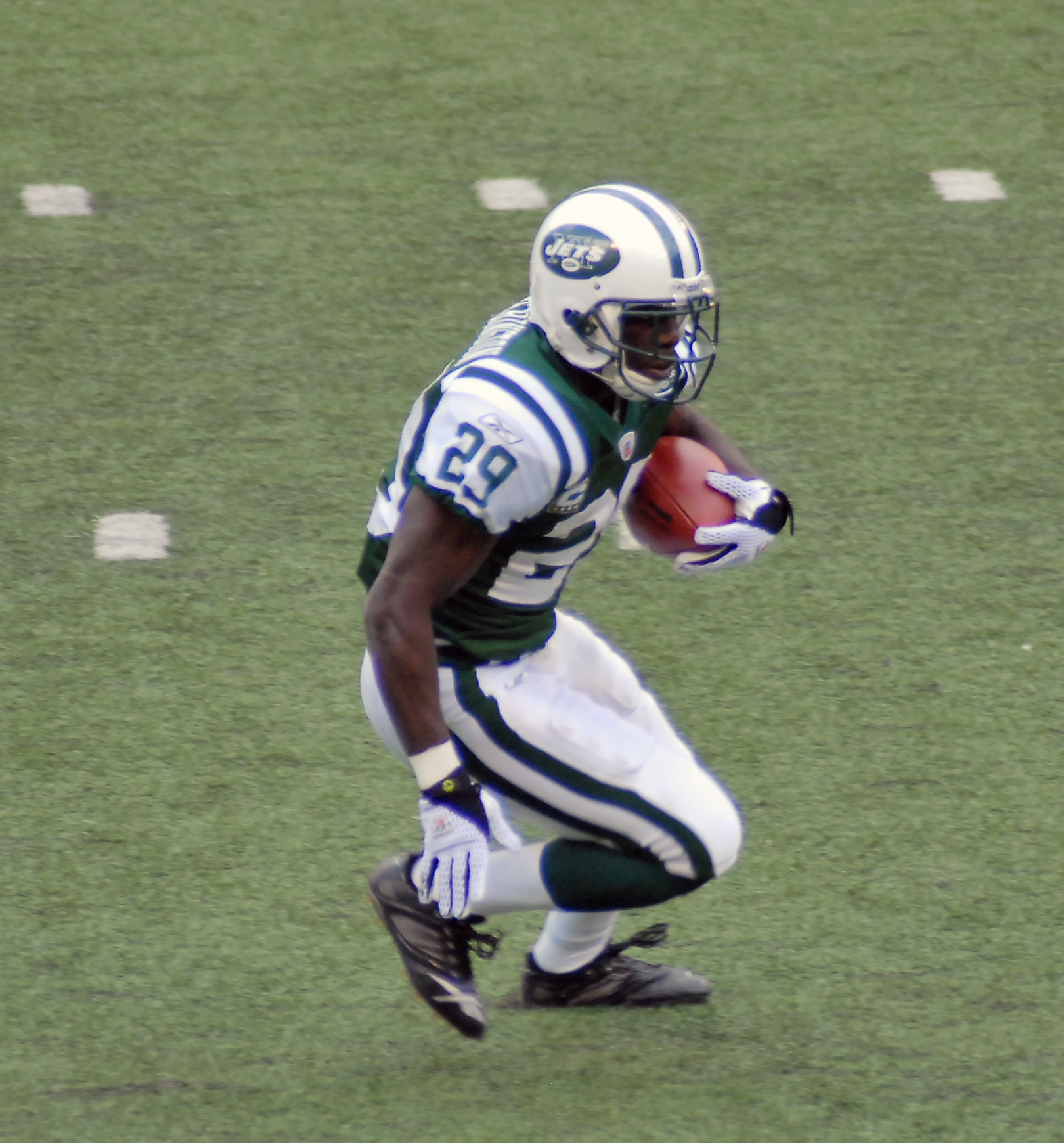
Running back Leon Washington was acquired by the Seahawks on April 24, 2010.

Former San Diego Chargers quarterback Charlie Whitehurst was acquired by Seattle on March 18, 2010. Whitehurst competed for the starting job with Matt Hasselbeck. Also, the Seahawks acquired defensive ends Chris Clemons and Robert Henderson respectively from the Eagles and Lions. Wide receiver Reggie Williams, a former first-round pick with the Jacksonville Jaguars and a former Washington Huskies standout, signed with the Seahawks on April 16, 2010.

On the last day of the 2010 NFL draft, the Seahawks acquired running back LenDale White and defensive tackle Kevin Vickerson from the Tennessee Titans. With the trade, White would have been reunited with his college coach Pete Carroll from USC, but was cut on May 28. Also, the New York Jets traded former Pro Bowler Leon Washington to Seattle.

=== 2010 NFL draft ===
After finishing the 2009 season with a record of 5–11, the Seahawks held the 6th overall pick in the 2010 NFL draft. They also held the 14th overall pick as a result of a trade in the 2009 NFL draft that gave their second-round pick 2009 to the Denver Broncos for their first-round pick in 2010. The Seahawks traded their third-round pick to the Philadelphia Eagles as part of a trade from the 2009 draft and gave up their second-round pick in the Charlie Whitehurst deal but also received another second-round pick from the San Diego Chargers

2010 Seattle Seahawks draft
Round	Selection	Player	Position	College	Notes
1	6	Russell Okung	T	Oklahoma State	
1	14	Earl Thomas	S	Texas	From Denver Broncos
2	60	Golden Tate	WR	Notre Dame	From San Diego Chargers
4	111	Walter Thurmond	CB	Oregon	From Tennessee Titans
4	127	E. J. Wilson	DE	North Carolina	From New York Jets via Philadelphia Eagles
5	133	Kam Chancellor	S	Virginia Tech	From Detroit Lions
6	185	Anthony McCoy	TE	Southern California	From Tennessee Titans
7	236	Dexter Davis	DE	Arizona State	From New York Jets
7	245	Jameson Konz	WR	Kent State	Compensatory pick

== Staff ==
2010 Seattle Seahawks staff
Front office: Chairman – Paul Allen; President – Peter McLoughlin; General manager – John Schneider; Vice president of football administration – John Idzik; Vice president of football operations – Will Lewis; Senior personnel executive – Scot McCloughan; Director of pro personnel – Tag Ribary; Director of college scouting – Scott Fitterer; Assistant director of college scouting – Eric Stokes; Assistant director of pro personnel – Trent Kirchner; Head coaches: Executive vice president of football operations/head coach – Pete Carroll; Offensive coaches: Offensive coordinator – Jeremy Bates; Quarterbacks – Jedd Fisch; Running backs – Sherman Smith; Wide receivers – Kippy Brown; Tight ends – Pat McPherson; Offensive line – Art Valero; Assistant offensive line – Pat Ruel; Quality control/offensive line – Luke Butkus; Offensive quality control – Dave Canales	Defensive coaches: Defensive coordinator – Gus Bradley; Defensive line – Dan Quinn; Linebackers – Ken Norton, Jr.; Defensive backs – Jerry Gray; Assistant defensive backs – Kris Richard; Defensive assistant – Nate Carroll; Defensive assistant – Mike Phair; Defensive quality control – Rocky Seto; Special teams coaches: Special teams coordinator – Brian Schneider; Assistant special teams – Jeff Ulbrich; Strength and conditioning: Head strength and conditioning – Chris Carlisle; Assistant strength and conditioning – Mondray Gee; Assistant strength and conditioning – Jamie Yancher

== Final roster ==
2010 Seattle Seahawks roster
Quarterbacks (QB): 8 Matt Hasselbeck; 7 J. P. Losman; 6 Charlie Whitehurst; Running backs (RB): 20 Justin Forsett; 24 Marshawn Lynch; 26 Michael Robinson FB; 33 Leon Washington; Wide receivers (WR): 82 Ruvell Martin; 87 Ben Obomanu; 15 Brandon Stokley; 81 Golden Tate; 17 Mike Williams; Tight ends (TE): 86 Chris Baker; 89 John Carlson; 88 Cameron Morrah	Offensive linemen (OL): 77 Stacy Andrews G; 66 Paul Fanaika G; 68 Breno Giacomini T; 64 Mike Gibson G; 75 Sean Locklear T; 76 Russell Okung T; 69 Chester Pitts G/T; 78 Tyler Polumbus T/G; 73 William Robinson T; 65 Chris Spencer C; 63 Chris White C; Defensive linemen (DL): 95 Kentwan Balmer DE/DT; 98 Raheem Brock DE; 91 Chris Clemons DE; 90 Colin Cole DT; 97 Amon Gordon DT; 92 Brandon Mebane DT; 99 Jay Richardson DE; 93 Craig Terrill DT	Linebackers (LB): 59 Aaron Curry OLB; 58 Dexter Davis OLB; 57 David Hawthorne OLB; 54 Will Herring OLB; 52 Matt McCoy OLB; 55 Joe Pawelek MLB; 51 Lofa Tatupu MLB; Defensive backs (DB): 27 Jordan Babineaux FS; 32 Marcus Brown CB; 31 Kam Chancellor SS; 39 Kennard Cox CB; 21 Kelly Jennings CB; 36 Lawyer Milloy SS; 29 Earl Thomas FS; 28 Walter Thurmond CB; 23 Marcus Trufant CB; Special teams (ST): 49 Clint Gresham LS; 10 Olindo Mare K; 9 Jon Ryan P	Practice squad: 18 Dominique Edison WR; 72 Maurice Fountain DE; 40 Chris Henry RB; 61 Lemuel Jeanpierre C; 48 Michael Johnson LB; 22 Josh Pinkard CB; 44 Vuna Tuihalamaka LB; 70 Derek Walker DE (IR); 19 Patrick Williams WR; Reserve: 79 Red Bryant DE (IR); 11 Deon Butler WR (IR); 53 Anthony Heygood OLB (IR); 56 Leroy Hill OLB (IR); 46 Jameson Konz TE (IR); 34 Roy Lewis CB (IR); 85 Anthony McCoy TE (IR); 94 Junior Siavii DT/DE (IR); 14 Isaiah Stanback WR (IR); 60 Max Unger G (IR); 74 Ray Willis T (IR); Rookies in italics 53 active, 12 reserve, 8 practice squad

== Preseason ==
=== Schedule ===
Week	Date	Opponent	Result	Record	Venue	Recap
1	August 14	Tennessee Titans	W 20–18	1–0	Qwest Field	Recap
2	August 21	Green Bay Packers	L 24–27	1–1	Qwest Field	Recap
3	August 28	at Minnesota Vikings	L 13–24	1–2	Mall of America Field	Recap
4	September 2	at Oakland Raiders	L 24–27	1–3	Oakland–Alameda County Coliseum	Recap

=== Game summaries ===
==== Week 1: vs. Tennessee Titans ====
Preseason Week 1: Seattle Seahawks vs. Tennessee Titans – Game summary

Quarter	1	2	3	4	Total
Titans	7	0	0	11	18
Seahawks	0	10	10	0	20

at Qwest Field, Seattle

- Date: August 14
- Game time: 7:05 p.m. local
- Game weather: Clear, 87 °F (31 °C)
- Game attendance: 65,352
- Referee: Pete Morelli
- TV: KING
- Recap, Game Book

==== Week 2: vs. Green Bay Packers ====
Preseason Week 2: Seattle Seahawks vs. Green Bay Packers – Game summary

Quarter	1	2	3	4	Total
Packers	14	3	0	10	27
Seahawks	7	7	7	3	24

at Qwest Field, Seattle

- Date: August 16
- Game time: 7:06 p.m. local
- Game weather: Clear, 74 °F (23 °C)
- Game attendance: 65,586
- Referee: Carl Cheffers
- TV: KING
- Recap, Game Book

==== Week 3: at Minnesota Vikings ====
Preseason Week 3: Seattle Seahawks at Minnesota Vikings – Game summary

Quarter	1	2	3	4	Total
Seahawks	0	10	3	0	13
Vikings	0	10	0	14	24

at Mall of America Field, Minneapolis

- Date: August 28
- Game time: 7:05 p.m. local
- Game weather: None (indoor stadium)
- Game attendance: 63,550
- Referee: Terry McAulay
- TV: KING
- Recap, Game Book

==== Week 4: at Oakland Raiders ====
Preseason Week 4: Seattle Seahawks at Oakland Raiders – Game summary

Quarter	1	2	3	4	Total
Seahawks	3	13	0	8	24
Raiders	17	0	7	3	27

at Oakland–Alameda County Coliseum, Oakland, California

- Date: September 2
- Game time: 7:00 p.m. local
- Game weather: Clear, 73 °F (23 °C)
- Game attendance: 23,957
- Referee: Jeff Triplette
- TV: KING
- Recap, Game Book

== Regular season ==
=== Schedule ===
Divisional matchups: the NFC West played the NFC South and the AFC West.

Week	Date	Opponent	Result	Record	Venue	Recap
1	September 12	**San Francisco 49ers**	**W** 31–6	1–0	Qwest Field	Recap
2	September 19	at Denver Broncos	**L** 14–31	1–1	Invesco Field at Mile High	Recap
3	September 26	San Diego Chargers	**W** 27–20	2–1	Qwest Field	Recap
4	October 3	at **St. Louis Rams**	**L** 3–20	2–2	Edward Jones Dome	Recap
5	Bye					
6	October 17	at Chicago Bears	**W** 23–20	3–2	Soldier Field	Recap
7	October 24	**Arizona Cardinals**	**W** 22–10	4–2	Qwest Field	Recap
8	October 31	at Oakland Raiders	**L** 3–33	4–3	Oakland–Alameda County Coliseum	Recap
9	November 7	New York Giants	**L** 7–41	4–4	Qwest Field	Recap
10	November 14	at **Arizona Cardinals**	**W** 36–18	5–4	University of Phoenix Stadium	Recap
11	November 21	at New Orleans Saints	**L** 19–34	5–5	Louisiana Superdome	Recap
12	November 28	Kansas City Chiefs	**L** 24–42	5–6	Qwest Field	Recap
13	December 5	Carolina Panthers	**W** 31–14	6–6	Qwest Field	Recap
14	December 12	at **San Francisco 49ers**	**L** 21–40	6–7	Candlestick Park	Recap
15	December 19	Atlanta Falcons	**L** 18–34	6–8	Qwest Field	Recap
16	December 26	at Tampa Bay Buccaneers	**L** 15–38	6–9	Raymond James Stadium	Recap
17	January 2, 2011	**St. Louis Rams**	**W** 16–6	7–9	Qwest Field	Recap

Bold indicates division opponents.
Source: 2010 NFL season results

=== Standings ===
NFC West
	W	L	T	PCT	DIV	CONF	PF	PA	STK
^{(4)} Seattle Seahawks	7	9	0	.438	4–2	6–6	310	407	W1
St. Louis Rams	7	9	0	.438	3–3	5–7	289	328	L1
San Francisco 49ers	6	10	0	.375	4–2	4–8	305	346	W1
Arizona Cardinals	5	11	0	.313	1–5	3–9	289	434	L1

=== Game summaries ===
==== Week 1: vs. San Francisco 49ers ====
Week 1: San Francisco 49ers at Seattle Seahawks – Game summary

Quarter	1	2	3	4	Total
49ers	3	3	0	0	**6**
**Seahawks**	0	14	14	3	**31**

at Qwest Field, Seattle

- Date: September 12
- Game time: 1:16 p.m. local
- Game weather: Clear, 64 °F (18 °C)
- Game attendance: 67,044
- Referee: Mike Carey
- TV announcers (Fox): Sam Rosen, Tim Ryan and Chris Myers
- Recap, Game Book

Game information

**First quarter**

- SF – Joe Nedney 23-yard field goal, 10:16. 49ers 3–0. **Drive: 8 plays, 24 yards, 4:35.**

**Second quarter**

- SF – Joe Nedney 23-yard field goal, 6:23. 49ers 6–0. **Drive: 9 plays, 31 yards, 5:48.**
- SEA – Matt Hasselbeck 1-yard run (Olindo Mare kick), 2:26. Seahawks 7–6. **Drive: 7 plays, 64 yards, 3:57.**
- SEA – Deon Butler 13-yard pass from Matt Hasselbeck (Olindo Mare kick), 1:27. Seahawks 14–6. **Drive: 1 play, 13 yards, 0:06.**

**Third quarter**

- SEA – Marcus Trufant 32-yard interception return (Olindo Mare kick), 13:59. Seahawks 21–6.
- SEA – Deion Branch 3-yard pass from Matt Hasselbeck (Olindo Mare kick), 10:30. Seahawks 28–6. **Drive: 7 plays, 60 yards, 2:56.**

**Fourth quarter**

- SEA – Olindo Mare 35-yard field goal, 2:24. Seahawks 31–6. **Drive: 10 plays, 57 yards, 6:32.**

**Top passers**

- SF – Alex Smith – 26/45, 225 yards, 2 INT
- SEA – Matt Hasselbeck – 18/23, 170 yards, 2 TD, INT

**Top rushers**

- SF – Frank Gore – 17 rushes, 38 yards
- SEA – Justin Forsett – 7 rushes, 43 yards

**Top receivers**

- SF – Vernon Davis – 8 receptions, 73 yards
- SEA – Mike Williams – 4 receptions, 64 yards

The Seahawks began their season at home for an NFC West rivalry against the San Francisco 49ers. In the first quarter, Seattle trailed early when 49ers kicker Joe Nedney made a 23-yard field goal, which was extended in the second quarter when Nedney made another 23-yard field goal. Then, the Seahawks fought back and took the lead when quarterback Matt Hasselbeck got a 1-yard touchdown run, followed by him making a 13-yard touchdown pass to wide receiver Deon Butler. In the third quarter, Seattle continued to dominate when cornerback Marcus Trufant returned an interception and ran 32 yards for a touchdown. This was followed by Hasselbeck's 3-yard touchdown pass to wide receiver Deion Branch. In the fourth quarter, the Seahawks scored again when kicker Olindo Mare made a 35-yard field goal.

With the win, Seattle began the season at 1–0.

==== Week 2: at Denver Broncos ====
Week 2: Seattle Seahawks at Denver Broncos – Game summary

Quarter	1	2	3	4	Total
Seahawks	0	0	7	7	**14**
**Broncos**	7	10	7	7	**31**

at Invesco Field at Mile High, Denver

- Date: September 19
- Game time: 2:06 p.m. local
- Game weather: Clear, 91 °F (33 °C)
- Game attendance: 75,130
- Referee: Walt Anderson
- TV announcers (Fox): Kenny Albert, Daryl Johnston and Tony Siragusa
- Recap, Game Book

Game information

**First quarter**

- DEN – Eddie Royal 13-yard pass from Kyle Orton (Matt Prater kick), 3:48. Broncos 7–0. **Drive: 3 plays, 13 yards, 1:16.**

**Second quarter**

- DEN – Correll Buckhalter 1-yard run (Matt Prater kick), 10:30. Broncos 14–0. **Drive: 10 plays, 81 yards, 4:41.**
- DEN – Matt Prater 20-yard field goal, 0:11. Broncos 17–0. **Drive: 16 plays, 91 yards, 6:07.**

**Third quarter**

- SEA – Ben Obomanu 11-yard pass from Matt Hasselbeck (Olindo Mare kick), 9:47. Broncos 17–7. **Drive: 5 plays, 22 yards, 2:04.**
- DEN – Knowshon Moreno 1-yard run (Matt Prater kick), 3:31. Broncos 24–7. **Drive: 10 plays, 80 yards, 6:16.**

**Fourth quarter**

- DEN – Demaryius Thomas 21-yard pass from Kyle Orton (Matt Prater kick), 9:11. Broncos 31–7. **Drive: 14 plays, 80 yards, 7:56.**
- SEA – Matt Hasselbeck 20-yard run (Olindo Mare kick), 5:59. Broncos 31–14. **Drive: 8 plays, 80 yards, 3:12.**

**Top passers**

- SEA – Matt Hasselbeck – 20/35, 233 yards, TD, 3 INT
- DEN – Kyle Orton – 25/35, 307 yards, 2 TD

**Top rushers**

- SEA – Justin Forsett – 8 rushes, 44 yards
- DEN – Knowshon Moreno – 24 rushes, 51 yards, TD

**Top receivers**

- SEA – Golden Tate – 1 reception, 52 yards
- DEN – Demaryius Thomas – 8 receptions, 97 yards, TD

Coming off an easy win over the 49ers, the Seahawks flew to INVESCO Field at Mile High for an interconference duel with their former division rival, the Broncos. In the first quarter Seattle trailed early as quarterback Kyle Orton made a 13-yard touchdown pass to wide receiver Eddie Royal, followed in the second quarter by running back Correll Buckhalter getting a 1-yard touchdown run. Then kicker Matt Prater made a 20-yard field goal to put the Broncos up 17–0. In the third quarter Seattle tried to cut the lead when quarterback Matt Hasselbeck completed an 11-yard touchdown pass to wide receiver Ben Obomanu, but Denver scored with running back Knowshon Moreno getting a 1-yard touchdown run. In the fourth quarter Seattle fell further behind when Orton found wide receiver Demaryius Thomas on a 21-yard touchdown pass. Seattle would make the final score of the game when Hasselbeck scrambled 20 yards to the endzone for a touchdown.

With the loss, Seattle fell to 1–1.

==== Week 3: vs. San Diego Chargers ====
Week 3: San Diego Chargers at Seattle Seahawks – Game summary

Quarter	1	2	3	4	Total
Chargers	0	0	12	8	**20**
**Seahawks**	0	10	7	10	**27**

at Qwest Field, Seattle

- Date: September 26
- Game time: 1:16 p.m. local
- Game weather: Cloudy, 68 °F (20 °C)
- Game attendance: 67,106
- Referee: Ron Winter
- TV announcers (CBS): Ian Eagle and Dan Fouts
- Recap, Game Book

Game information

**First quarter** No scoring plays **Second quarter**

- SEA – Olindo Mare 23-yard field goal, 11:28. Seahawks 3–0. **Drive: 9 plays, 80 yards, 4:38.**
- SEA – John Carlson 9-yard pass from Matt Hasselbeck (Olindo Mare kick), 0:53. Seahawks 10–0. **Drive: 3 plays, 41 yards, 0:22.**

**Third quarter**

- SEA – Leon Washington 101-yard kickoff return (Olindo Mare kick), 14:47. Seahawks 17–0)
- SD – Malcom Floyd 3-yard pass from Philip Rivers (Nate Kaeding kick), 12:33. Seahawks 17–7. **Drive: 4 plays, 80 yards, 2:14.**
- SD – Brandon Siler tackled Matt Hasselbeck in the end zone for a safety, 4:31. Seahawks 17–9.
- SD – Nate Kaeding 29-yard field goal, 0:37. Seahawks 17–12. **Drive: 9 plays, 44 yards, 3:54.**

**Fourth quarter**

- SEA – Olindo Mare 23-yard field goal, 11:27. Seahawks 20–12. **Drive: 4 plays, 6 yards, 0:59.**
- SD – Antonio Gates 12-yard pass from Philip Rivers (Philip Rivers–Legedu Naanee pass), 6:39. Tied 20–20. **Drive: 9 plays, 65 yards, 4:48.**
- SEA – Leon Washington 99-yard kickoff return (Olindo Mare kick), 6:24. Seahawks 27–20.

**Top passers**

- SD – Philip Rivers – 29/53, 455 yards, 2 TD, 2 INT
- SEA – Matt Hasselbeck – 19/32, 220 yards, TD, INT

**Top rushers**

- SD – Mike Tolbert – 17 rushes, 73 yards
- SEA – Justin Forsett – 17 rushes, 63 yards

**Top receivers**

- SD – Antonio Gates – 7 receptions, 109 yards, TD
- SEA – John Carlson – 5 receptions, 61 yards, TD

The Seahawks' third game was played at home ground when they played their former division rival, the San Diego Chargers. In the second quarter Seattle took the early lead when kicker Olindo Mare made a 23-yard field goal. Then quarterback Matt Hasselbeck completed a 9-yard touchdown pass to tight end John Carlson. This was followed in the third quarter by running back Leon Washington returning a kickoff 101 yards to the endzone for a touchdown. The lead was broken down with quarterback Philip Rivers getting a 3-yard touchdown pass to wide receiver Malcolm Floyd, followed by Hasselbeck getting sacked by linebacker Brandon Siler in the endzone for a safety. Then kicker Nate Kaeding made a 29-yard field goal. The Seahawks increased their lead when Mare made a 23-yard field goal, but the Chargers replied and tied the game when Rivers found tight end Antonio Gates on a 12-yard touchdown pass (with a successful two-point conversion as Rivers found wide receiver Legedu Naanee). Before the clock struck zero Seattle took the winning score as running back Leon Washington returned his second kickoff of the game into the endzone running 99 yards for a touchdown. Rivers and the Chargers attempted to make a comeback with less than a minute left, but was picked off by rookie Earl Thomas to seal the win for Seattle.

With the win, Seattle improved to 2–1.

==== Week 4: at St. Louis Rams ====
Week 4: Seattle Seahawks at St. Louis Rams – Game summary

Quarter	1	2	3	4	Total
Seahawks	0	3	0	0	**3**
**Rams**	7	3	7	3	**20**

at Edward Jones Dome, St. Louis, Missouri

- Date: October 3
- Game time: 12:00 p.m. local
- Game weather: None (indoor stadium)
- Game attendance: 52,326
- Referee: Pete Morelli
- TV announcers (Fox): Ron Pitts, John Lynch and Nischelle Turner
- Recap, Game Book

Game information

**First quarter**

- STL – Brandon Gibson 15-yard pass from Sam Bradford (Josh Brown kick), 5:49. Rams 7–0. **Drive: 10 plays, 90 yards, 4:09.**

**Second quarter**

- SEA – Olindo Mare 22-yard field goal, 14:20. Rams 7–3. **Drive: 14 plays, 81 yards, 6:29.**
- STL – Josh Brown 30-yard field goal, 0:00. Rams 10–3. **Drive: 8 plays, 45 yards, 1:01.**

**Third quarter**

- STL – Kenneth Darby 21-yard pass from Sam Bradford (Josh Brown kick), 10:39. Rams 17–3. **Drive: 8 plays, 67 yards, 2:59.**

**Fourth quarter**

- STL – Josh Brown 31-yard field goal, 2:35. Rams 20–3. **Drive: 9 plays, 44 yards, 4:42.**

**Top passers**

- SEA – Matt Hasselbeck – 20/36, 191 yards, INT
- STL – Sam Bradford – 23/41, 289 yards, 2 TD, INT

**Top rushers**

- SEA – Justin Forsett – 19 rushes, 65 yards
- STL – Steven Jackson – 22 rushes, 70 yards

**Top receivers**

- SEA – Brandon Stokley – 4 receptions, 62 yards
- STL – Mark Clayton – 5 receptions, 72 yards

The Seahawks' fourth game was played at Edward Jones Dome where they played an NFC west rivalry match against the Rams. In the first quarter the Seahawks trailed early as quarterback Sam Bradford completed a 15-yard touchdown pass to wide receiver Brandon Gibson. The Seahawks cut the lead with kicker Olindo Mare nailing a 22-yard field goal, but the Rams increased their lead when kicker Josh Brown made a 30-yard field goal, followed in the 3rd quarter by Bradford completing a 21-yard touchdown pass to running back Kenneth Darby. Then Josh Brown made a 31-yard field goal to put the Seahawks further behind.

With the loss, Seattle fell to 2–2 coming into their bye week and their 10-game winning streak against the Rams was snapped.

==== Week 6: at Chicago Bears ====
Week 6: Seattle Seahawks at Chicago Bears – Game summary

Quarter	1	2	3	4	Total
**Seahawks**	7	7	2	7	**23**
Bears	7	6	0	7	**20**

at Soldier Field, Chicago, Illinois

- Date: October 17
- Game time: 12:02 p.m. local
- Game weather: Clear, 61 °F (16 °C)
- Game attendance: 62,137
- Referee: Alberto Riveron
- TV announcers (Fox): Chris Myers, Brian Billick and Charissa Thompson
- Recap, Game Book

Game information

**First quarter**

- CHI – Matt Forte 6-yard run (Robbie Gould kick), 12:42. Bears 7–0. **Drive: 4 plays, 80 yards, 2:18.**
- SEA – Deon Butler 22-yard pass from Matt Hasselbeck (Olindo Mare kick), 10:03. Tied 7–7. **Drive: 6 plays, 80 yards, 2:39.**

**Second quarter**

- SEA – Justin Forsett 9-yard run (Olindo Mare kick), 14:51. Seahawks 14–7. **Drive: 7 plays, 37 yards, 2:41.**
- CHI – Robbie Gould 34-yard field goal, 11:51. Seahawks 14–10. **Drive: 7 plays, 65 yards, 3:00.**
- CHI – Robbie Gould 24-yard field goal, 1:10. Seahawks 14–13. **Drive: 7 plays, 86 yards, 2:19.**

**Third quarter**

- SEA – Jordan Babineaux tackled Jay Cutler in the end zone for a safety, 11:40. Seahawks 16–13.

**Fourth quarter**

- SEA – Marshawn Lynch 1-yard run (Olindo Mare kick), 13:45. Seahawks 23–13. **Drive: 11 plays, 92 yards, 5:43.**
- CHI – Devin Hester 89-yard punt return (Robbie Gould kick), 1:54. Seahawks 23–20.

**Top passers**

- SEA – Matt Hasselbeck – 25/40, 242 yards, TD
- CHI – Jay Cutler – 17/39, 290 yards

**Top rushers**

- SEA – Justin Forsett – 10 rushes, 67 yards, TD
- CHI – Chester Taylor – 4 rushes, 31 yards

**Top receivers**

- SEA – Mike Williams – 10 receptions, 123 yards
- CHI – Johnny Knox – 5 receptions, 120 yards

Following a bye week, the Seahawks traveled to Soldier Field and face the Chicago Bears with a new weapon in running back Marshawn Lynch. Chicago quickly scored in the first quarter with a Matt Forte 6-yard run, but Matt Hasselbeck and the offense would respond quickly with a 22-yard touchdown reception by Deon Butler. Seattle would extend the lead to 14–7 with a Justin Forsett touchdown run near the beginning of the 2nd quarter, but two Chicago field goals made by Robbie Gould would bring the Bears to a one-point deficit at halftime. However, Chicago's offense was continuously hampered by the Seahawks' blitzes, roughing up Jay Cutler for 6 sacks and a safety in the 3rd quarter. Lynch would score his first touchdown as a Seahawk later in the game, extending Seattle's lead to 23–13. The Bears tried to rallied within the last few minutes of the game as Devin Hester scored on an 89-yard punt return for a touchdown (his 13th, which tied an NFL record for most punt/kick return touchdowns by a single player), but an onside kick recovered by tight end John Carlson sealed Seattle's first non-division road victory since 2007.

With the win, the Seahawks moved to 3–2.

==== Week 7: vs. Arizona Cardinals ====
Week 7: Arizona Cardinals at Seattle Seahawks – Game summary

Quarter	1	2	3	4	Total
Cardinals	0	0	7	3	**10**
**Seahawks**	7	3	9	3	**22**

at Qwest Field, Seattle

- Date: October 24
- Game time: 1:06 p.m. local
- Game weather: Cloudy, 52 °F (11 °C)
- Game attendance: 67,132
- Referee: Jeff Triplette
- TV announcers (Fox): Chris Myers, Brian Billick and Charissa Thompson
- Recap, Game Book

Game information

**First quarter**

- SEA – Olindo Mare 20-yard field goal, 7:29. Seahawks 3–0. **Drive: 14 plays, 78 yards, 7:31.**

**Second quarter**

- SEA – Mike Williams 2-yard pass from Matt Hasselbeck (Olindo Mare kick), 5:46. Seahawks 10–0. **Drive: 2 plays, 2 yards, 0:09.**

**Third quarter**

- SEA – Olindo Mare 31-yard field goal, 12:11. Seahawks 13–0. **Drive: 4 plays, −2 yards, 1:55.**
- SEA – Olindo Mare 51-yard field goal, 10:57. Seahawks 16–0. **Drive: 4 plays, −17 yards, 1:14.**
- ARI – Beanie Wells 2-yard run (Jay Feely kick), 5:43. Seahawks 16–7. **Drive: 8 plays, 70 yards, 5:14.**
- SEA – Olindo Mare 24-yard field goal, 0:49. Seahawks 19–7. **Drive: 14 plays, 78 yards, 4:54.**

**Fourth quarter**

- ARI – Jay Feely 24-yard field goal, 14:48. Seahawks 19–10. **Drive: 5 plays, 27 yards, 1:01.**
- SEA – Olindo Mare 26-yard field goal, 7:28. Seahawks 22–10. **Drive: 12 plays, 57 yards, 7:20.**

**Top passers**

- ARI – Derek Anderson – 8/17, 96 yards
- SEA – Matt Hasselbeck – 20/38, 192 yards, TD

**Top rushers**

- ARI – Tim Hightower – 6 rushes, 59 yards
- SEA – Marshawn Lynch – 24 rushes, 89 yards

**Top receivers**

- ARI – Andre Roberts – 2 receptions, 40 yards
- SEA – Mike Williams – 11 receptions, 87 yards, TD

Coming off their win over the Bears the Seahawks played on home ground for an NFC West rivalry match against the Cardinals. In the first quarter the Seahawks took the lead as kicker Olindo Mare got a 20-yard field goal. Followed in the second quarter by quarterback Matt Hasselbeck making a 2-yard touchdown pass to wide receiver Mike Williams. The Seahawks increased their lead in the 3rd quarter with Mare nailing a 31 and a 51-yard field goal. The Cardinals replied with running back Beanie Wells getting a 2-yard touchdown run. The Seahawks continued to score with Mare hitting a 24-yard field goal, but the Cardinals responded in the fourth quarter with kicker Jay Feely getting a 24-yard field goal. The Seahawks pulled away with Mare making a 26-yard field goal.

With the win, the Seahawks improved to 4–2.

==== Week 8: at Oakland Raiders ====
Week 8: Seattle Seahawks at Oakland Raiders – Game summary

Quarter	1	2	3	4	Total
Seahawks	0	0	0	3	**3**
**Raiders**	3	7	3	20	**33**

at Network Associates Coliseum, Oakland, California

- Date: October 31
- Game time: 1:15 p.m. local
- Game weather: Clear, 66 °F (19 °C)
- Game attendance: 35,721
- Referee: Ed Hochuli
- TV announcers (Fox): Ron Pitts, John Lynch and Nischelle Turner (blacked out locally)
- Recap, Game Book

Game information

**First quarter**

- OAK – Sebastian Janikowski 31-yard field goal, 5:14. Raiders 3–0. **Drive: 8 plays, 45 yards, 3:05.**

**Second quarter**

- OAK – Marcel Reece 30-yard pass from Jason Campbell (Sebastian Janikowski kick), 8:54. Raiders 10–0. **Drive: 12 plays, 87 yards, 5:54.**

**Third quarter**

- OAK – Sebastian Janikowski 36-yard field goal, 9:09. Raiders 13–0. **Drive: 9 plays, 76 yards, 3:43.**

**Fourth quarter**

- OAK – Sebastian Janikowski 22-yard field goal, 14:52. Raiders 16–0. **Drive: 8 plays, 82 yards, 3:38.**
- OAK – Darrius Heyward-Bey 69-yard pass from Jason Campbell (Sebastian Janikowski kick), 13:26. Raiders 23–0. **Drive: 1 play, 69 yards, 0:10.**
- SEA – Olindo Mare 47-yard field goal, 8:57. Raiders 23–3. **Drive: 11 plays, 21 yards, 4:29.**
- OAK – Sebastian Janikowski 49-yard field goal, 7:18. Raiders 26–3. **Drive: 4 plays, 5 yards, 1:39.**
- OAK – Michael Bush 4-yard run (Sebastian Janikowski kick), 1:56. Raiders 33–3. **Drive: 6 plays, 66 yards, 4:06.**

**Top passers**

- SEA – Matt Hasselbeck – 13/32, 163 yards, INT
- OAK – Jason Campbell – 15/27, 310 yards, 2 TD

**Top rushers**

- SEA – Leon Washington – 5 rushes, 29 yards
- OAK – Darren McFadden – 21 rushes, 111 yards

**Top receivers**

- SEA – John Carlson – 3 receptions, 47 yards
- OAK – Darrius Heyward-Bey – 5 receptions, 105 yards, TD

Hoping to increase their winning streak the Seahawks flew to Oakland–Alameda County Coliseum where they played their former division rival, the Oakland Raiders. The Seahawks immediately trailed on a scoring rally by the Raiders with kicker Sebastian Janikowski nailing a 31-yard field goal. This was followed in the second quarter by quarterback Jason Campbell's 30-yard touchdown pass to FB Marcel Reece. Then in the third quarter Janikowski made a 36-yard field goal. Then he made a 22-yard field goal in the fourth quarter to put the Raiders up 16–0. The Seahawks struggled further with Campbell getting a 69-yard touchdown pass to wide receiver Darrius Heyward-Bey. The Seahawks would make their only score of the game with kicker Olindo Mare hitting a 47-yard field goal. However, they continued to trail as Janikowski made a 49-yard field goal, followed by running back Michael Bush making a 4-yard touchdown run.

With the loss, the Seahawks fell to 4–3.

==== Week 9: vs. New York Giants ====
Week 9: New York Giants at Seattle Seahawks – Game summary

Quarter	1	2	3	4	Total
**Giants**	21	14	6	0	**41**
Seahawks	0	0	0	7	**7**

at Qwest Field, Seattle

- Date: November 7
- Game time: 1:05 p.m. local
- Game weather: Partly cloudy, 55 °F (13 °C)
- Game attendance: 67,287
- Referee: Pete Morelli
- TV announcers (Fox): Joe Buck, Troy Aikman and Pam Oliver
- Recap, Game Book

Game information

**First quarter**

- NYG – Ahmad Bradshaw 2-yard run (Lawrence Tynes kick), 5:49. Giants 7–0. **Drive: 7 plays, 52 yards, 3:37.**
- NYG – Hakeem Nicks 46-yard pass from Eli Manning (Lawrence Tynes kick), 2:18. Giants 14–0. **Drive: 4 plays, 63 yards, 2:00.**
- NYG – Ahmad Bradshaw 4-yard run (Lawrence Tynes kick), 2:03. Giants 21–0. **Drive: 1 plays, 4 yards, 0:05.**

**Second quarter**

- NYG – Steve Smith 6-yard pass from Eli Manning (Lawrence Tynes kick), 9:15. Giants 28–0. **Drive: 11 plays, 73 yards, 5:31.**
- NYG – Kevin Boss 5-yard pass from Eli Manning (Lawrence Tynes kick), 0:53. Giants 35–0. **Drive: 10 plays, 86 yards, 4:11.**

**Third quarter**

- NYG – Lawrence Tynes 25-yard field goal, 10:05. Giants 38–0. **Drive: 5 plays, 40 yards, 1:20.**
- NYG – Lawrence Tynes 20-yard field goal, 0:00. Giants 41–0. **Drive: 15 plays, 78 yards, 8:29.**

**Fourth quarter**

- SEA – Ben Obomanu 36-yard pass from Charlie Whitehurst (Olindo Mare kick), 13:34. Giants 41–7. **Drive: 3 plays, 70 yards, 1:26.**

**Top passers**

- NYG – Eli Manning – 21/32, 290 yards, 3 TD
- SEA – Charlie Whitehurst – 12/23, 113 yards, TD, 2 INT

**Top rushers**

- NYG – Brandon Jacobs – 11 rushes, 78 yards
- SEA – Marshawn Lynch – 11 rushes, 48 yards

**Top receivers**

- NYG – Hakeem Nicks – 6 receptions, 128 yards, TD
- SEA – Ben Obomanu – 1 reception, 36 yards, TD

The Seahawks' eighth game was an NFC duel with the Giants at home. The Giants took control with running back Ahmad Bradshaw getting a 2-yard touchdown run, followed by Eli Manning's 46-yard touchdown pass to wide receiver Hakeem Nicks, followed by Bradshaw's 4-yard touchdown run. In the second quarter, quarterback Eli Manning found wide receiver Steve Smith and tight end Kevin Boss on 6 and 5-yard touchdown passes respectively. The lead was expanded by kicker Lawrence Tynes who made a 25 and a 20-yard field goal. Seattle made their only score of the game, with quarterback Charlie Whitehurst completing a 36-yard touchdown pass to wide receiver Ben Obomanu.

With the loss, Seattle fell to 4–4. This also marks the first time that they lost to the Giants at home since 1981.

==== Week 10: at Arizona Cardinals ====
Week 10: Seattle Seahawks at Arizona Cardinals – Game summary

Quarter	1	2	3	4	Total
**Seahawks**	7	10	9	10	**36**
Cardinals	7	3	0	8	**18**

at University of Phoenix Stadium, Glendale, Arizona

- Date: November 14
- Game time: 2:15 p.m. local
- Game weather: None (indoor stadium)
- Game attendance: 61,904
- Referee: Scott Green
- TV announcers (Fox): Thom Brennaman and Brian Billick
- Recap, Game Book

Game information

**First quarter**

- ARI – Tim Hightower 2-yard run (Jay Feely kick), 12:48. Cardinals 7–0. **Drive: 5 plays, 52 yards, 2:12.**
- SEA – Marshawn Lynch 1-yard run (Olindo Mare kick), 7:44. Tied 7–7. **Drive: 12 plays, 77 yards, 5:04.**

**Second quarter**

- SEA – Olindo Mare 41-yard field goal, 13:23. Seahawks 10–7. **Drive: 8 plays, 67 yards, 3:18.**
- ARI – Jay Feely 23-yard field goal, 8:11. Tied 10–10. **Drive: 8 plays, 72 yards, 5:12.**
- SEA – Deon Butler 63-yard pass from Matt Hasselbeck (Olindo Mare kick), 7:28. Seahawks 17–10. **Drive: 2 plays, 80 yards, 0:43.**

**Third quarter**

- SEA – Olindo Mare 34-yard field goal, 7:05. Seahawks 20–10. **Drive: 10 plays, 64 yards, 4:52.**
- SEA – Olindo Mare 19-yard field goal, 4:50. Seahawks 23–10. **Drive: 6 plays, 31 yards, 2:02.**
- SEA – Olindo Mare 23-yard field goal, 1:15. Seahawks 26–10. **Drive: 6 plays, 12 yards, 2:45.**

**Fourth quarter**

- SEA – Olindo Mare 19-yard field goal, 12:18. Seahawks 29–10. **Drive: 7 plays, 10 yards, 2:55.**
- ARI – Early Doucet 2-yard pass from Derek Anderson (Derek Anderson–Larry Fitzgerald pass), 7:52. Seahawks 29–18. **Drive: 12 plays, 79 yards, 4:26.**
- SEA – Justin Forsett 4-yard run (Olindo Mare kick), 3:49. Seahawks 36–18. **Drive: 3 plays, 10 yards, 0:59.**

**Top passers**

- SEA – Matt Hasselbeck – 22/34, 333 yards, TD
- ARI – Derek Anderson – 23/45, 322 yards, TD, INT

**Top rushers**

- SEA – Justin Forsett – 9 rushes, 64 yards, TD
- ARI – Tim Hightower – 13 rushes, 39 yards, TD

**Top receivers**

- SEA – Mike Williams – 11 receptions, 145 yards
- ARI – Steve Breaston – 4 receptions, 98 yards

Hoping to rebound from their loss to the Giants the Seahawks flew to University of Phoenix Stadium for an NFC West rivalry match against the Cardinals. In the first quarter the Seahawks trailed early as running back Tim Hightower got a 2-yard touchdown run. They replied with running back Marshawn Lynch getting a 1-yard touchdown run. They took the lead with kicker Olindo Mare getting a 41-yard field goal, but the Cardinals replied with kicker Jay Feely nailing a 23-yard field goal. They took control with quarterback Matt Hasselbeck completing a 63-yard touchdown pass to wide receiver Deon Butler. This was followed in the third quarter by a 34, 19 and 23-yard field goal from Mare. In the fourth quarter Mare got another 19-yard field goal to put the Seahawks up 29–10. The Cardinals responded with quarterback Derek Anderson making a 2-yard touchdown pass to wide receiver Early Doucet (with a successful two-point conversion as Anderson found wide receiver Larry Fitzgerald), but the Seahawks put the game away with running back Justin Forsett getting a 4-yard touchdown run.

With the win, not only did the Seahawks improve to 5–4, but they swept the Cardinals for the first time since 2005. This was also their first win at University of Phoenix Stadium.

==== Week 11: at New Orleans Saints ====
Week 11: Seattle Seahawks at New Orleans Saints – Game summary

Quarter	1	2	3	4	Total
Seahawks	3	13	0	3	**19**
**Saints**	7	20	7	0	**34**

at Louisiana Superdome, New Orleans

- Date: November 21
- Game time: 3:05 p.m. local
- Game weather: None (indoor stadium)
- Game attendance: 70,015
- Referee: Mike Carey
- TV announcers (Fox): Thom Brennaman and Brian Billick
- Recap, Game Book

Game information

**First quarter**

- SEA – Olindo Mare 20-yard field goal, 7:07. Seahawks 3–0. **Drive: 9 plays, 80 yards, 4:36.**
- NO – Chris Ivory 1-yard run (Garrett Hartley kick), 1:30. Saints 7–3. **Drive: 12 plays, 80 yards, 5:37.**

**Second quarter**

- SEA – Olindo Mare 43-yard field goal, 14:55. Saints 7–6. **Drive: 5 plays, 45 yards, 1:35.**
- NO – Marques Colston 23-yard pass from Drew Brees (Garrett Hartley kick), 10:17. Saints 14–6. **Drive: 10 plays, 80 yards, 4:38.**
- NO – Robert Meachem 3-yard pass from Drew Brees (Garrett Hartley kick), 5:48. Saints 21–6. **Drive: 8 plays, 42 yards, 4:06.**
- SEA – Ben Obomanu 2-yard pass from Matt Hasselbeck (Olindo Mare kick), 1:54. Saints 21–13. **Drive: 12 plays, 69 yards, 3:54.**
- NO – Marques Colston 22-yard pass from Drew Brees (kick aborted), 1:00. Saints 27–13. **Drive: 5 plays, 75 yards, 0:54.**
- SEA – Olindo Mare 43-yard field goal, 0:00. Saints 27–16. **Drive: 5 plays, 35 yards, 1:00.**

**Third quarter**

- NO – Robert Meachem 32-yard pass from Drew Brees (Garrett Hartley kick), 12:18. Saints 34–16. **Drive: 6 plays, 80 yards, 2:42.**

**Fourth quarter**

- SEA – Olindo Mare 20-yard field goal, 5:26. Saints 34–19. **Drive: 15 plays, 78 yards, 7:02.**

**Top passers**

- SEA – Matt Hasselbeck – 32/44, 366 yards, TD
- NO – Drew Brees – 29/43, 382 yards, 4 TD, 2 INT

**Top rushers**

- SEA – Marshawn Lynch – 7 rushes, 36 yards
- NO – Chris Ivory – 23 rushes, 99 yards, TD

**Top receivers**

- SEA – Mike Williams – 6 receptions, 109 yards
- NO – Marques Colston – 8 receptions, 113 yards, 2 TD

The Seahawks' tenth game was an NFC duel with the Saints. In the first quarter the Seahawks took the lead as kicker Olindo Mare hit a 20-yard field goal; but the Saints pulled ahead after running back Chris Ivory got a 1-yard touchdown run. The lead narrowed in the second quarter by Mare getting a 43-yard field goal, but the Seahawks fell further behind when quarterback Drew Brees made a 23 and a 3-yard touchdown pass to wide receiver Marques Colston and wide receiver Robert Meachem respectively. The Seahawks cut the lead again after quarterback Matt Hasselbeck got a 2-yard touchdown pass to wide receiver Ben Obomanu; but the Saints replied with Brees throwing a 22-yard touchdown pass to Colston. The Seahawks tried to cut the lead with Mare hitting a 43-yard field goal. The lead extended in the third quarter with Brees finding Meachem again on a 32-yard touchdown pass. The Seahawks made the only score of the fourth quarter with Mare making a 20-yard field goal; however, the Saints' defense closed off any more chances.

With the loss, Seattle fell to 5–5.

==== Week 12: vs. Kansas City Chiefs ====
Week 12: Kansas City Chiefs at Seattle Seahawks – Game summary

Quarter	1	2	3	4	Total
**Chiefs**	7	14	0	21	**42**
Seahawks	7	3	7	7	**24**

at Qwest Field, Seattle

- Date: November 28
- Game time: 1:05 p.m. local
- Game weather: Clear, 43 °F (6 °C)
- Game attendance: 66,370
- Referee: Tony Corrente
- TV announcers (CBS): Bill Macatee and Rich Gannon
- Recap, Game Book

Game information

**First quarter**

- KC – Dwayne Bowe 7-yard pass from Matt Cassel (Ryan Succop kick), 11:31. Chiefs 7–0. **Drive: 7 plays, 72 yards, 3:29.**
- SEA – Earl Thomas 10-yard blocked punt return (Olindo Mare kick), 0:31. Tied 7–7.

**Second quarter**

- KC – Shaun Smith 1-yard run (Ryan Succop kick), 7:18. Chiefs 14–7. **Drive: 15 plays, 74 yards, 8:13.**
- KC – Dwayne Bowe 36-yard pass from Matt Cassel (Ryan Succop kick), 1:12. Chiefs 21–7. **Drive: 6 plays, 80 yards, 2:38.**
- SEA – Olindo Mare 43-yard field goal, 0:00. Chiefs 21–10. **Drive: 6 plays, 18 yards, 0:28.**

**Third quarter**

- SEA – Chris Baker 13-yard pass from Matt Hasselbeck (Olindo Mare kick), 14:03. Chiefs 21–17. **Drive: 2 plays, 71 yards, 0:57.**

**Fourth quarter**

- KC – Jamaal Charles 3-yard run (Ryan Succop kick), 14:54. Chiefs 28–17. **Drive: 11 plays, 71 yards, 6:06.**
- KC – Dwayne Bowe 9-yard pass from Matt Cassel (Ryan Succop kick), 12:43. Chiefs 35–17. **Drive: 3 plays, 22 yards, 1:10.**
- SEA – Ben Obomanu 87-yard pass from Matt Hasselbeck (Olindo Mare kick), 10:16. Chiefs 35–24. **Drive: 1 plays, 87 yards, 0:13.**
- KC – Tony Moeaki 6-yard pass from Matt Cassel (Ryan Succop kick), 3:36. Chiefs 42–24. **Drive: 10 plays, 80 yards, 6:40.**

**Top passers**

- KC – Matt Cassel – 22/32, 233 yards, 4 TD
- SEA – Matt Hasselbeck – 20/37, 282 yards, 2 TD, 2 INT

**Top rushers**

- KC – Jamaal Charles – 22 rushes, 173 yards, TD
- SEA – Marshawn Lynch – 7 rushes, 20 yards

**Top receivers**

- KC – Dwayne Bowe – 13 receptions, 170 yards, 3 TD
- SEA – Ben Obomanu – 5 receptions, 159 yards, TD

Hoping to rebound from their loss to the Saints the Seahawks played on home ground where they played their former division rival, the Kansas City Chiefs. In the first quarter, the Seahawks trailed early with quarterback Matt Cassel getting a 7-yard touchdown pass to wide receiver Dwayne Bowe. They responded after free safety Earl Thomas returned a blocked punt 10 yards for a touchdown. They fell behind as Shaun Smith got a 1-yard touchdown run, followed by Cassel finding Bowe again on a 36-yard touchdown pass. The Seahawks cut the lead when kicker Olindo Mare got a 43-yard field goal, followed by quarterback Matt Hasselbeck getting a 13-yard touchdown pass to tight end Chris Baker. The struggled further with running back Jamaal Charles getting a 3-yard touchdown run, followed by Cassel throwing to Bowe on a 9-yard touchdown pass. The Seahawks responded as Hasselbeck completed an 87-yard touchdown pass to wide receiver Ben Obomanu, but the Chiefs increased their lead as Cassel got a 6-yard touchdown pass to tight end Tony Moeaki.

With the loss, Seattle fell to 5–6.

==== Week 13: vs. Carolina Panthers ====
Week 13: Carolina Panthers at Seattle Seahawks – Game summary

Quarter	1	2	3	4	Total
Panthers	7	7	0	0	**14**
**Seahawks**	0	3	21	7	**31**

at Qwest Field, Seattle

- Date: December 5
- Game time: 1:16 p.m. local
- Game weather: Cloudy, 45 °F (7 °C)
- Game attendance: 66,577
- Referee: Gene Steratore
- TV announcers (Fox): Chris Rose and Ross Tucker
- Recap, Game Book

Game information

**First quarter**

- CAR – Mike Goodson 6-yard run (John Kasay kick), 10:51. Panthers 7–0. **Drive: 10 plays, 61 yards, 4:09.**

**Second quarter**

- CAR – Jonathan Stewart 3-yard run (John Kasay kick), 8:05. Panthers 14–0. **Drive: 10 plays, 79 yards, 5:00.**
- SEA – Olindo Mare 24-yard field goal, 0:38. Panthers 14–3. **Drive: 10 plays, 74 yards, 2:36.**

**Third quarter**

- SEA – Marshawn Lynch 1-yard run (Olindo Mare kick), 10:46. Panthers 14–10. **Drive: 9 plays, 96 yards, 4:14.**
- SEA – Lofa Tatupu 26-yard interception return (Olindo Mare kick), 9:18. Seahawks 17–14.
- SEA – Marshawn Lynch 1-yard run (Olindo Mare kick), 6:09. Seahawks 24–14. **Drive: 2 plays, 2 yards, 0:41.**

**Fourth quarter**

- SEA – Marshawn Lynch 22-yard run (Olindo Mare kick), 4:24. Seahawks 31–14. **Drive: 9 plays, 81 yards, 4:24.**

**Top passers**

- CAR – Jimmy Clausen – 18/34, 169 yards, INT
- SEA – Matt Hasselbeck – 17/30, 229 yards, 2 INT

**Top rushers**

- CAR – Jonathan Stewart – 21 rushes, 92 yards, TD
- SEA – Marshawn Lynch – 21 rushes, 83 yards, 3 TD

**Top receivers**

- CAR – Steve Smith – 3 receptions, 54 yards
- SEA – Cameron Morrah – 3 receptions, 69 yards

Hoping to rebound from their loss to the Chiefs the Seahawks played on home ground for an NFC duel with the Panthers. In the first quarter the Seahawks trailed early as running back Mike Goodson got a 6-yard touchdown run, followed by running back Jonathan Stewart getting a 3-yard touchdown run. They commanded the rest of the game with kicker Olindo Mare getting a 24-yard field goal, followed by running back Marshawn Lynch getting a 1-yard touchdown run, then with Lofa Tatupu returning an interception 26 yards for a touchdown. The lead was extended with Lynch getting touchdown runs of 1 yard and 22 yards.

With the win, not only did the Seahawks improve to 6–6, they surpassed their victory mark of the last 2 seasons.

==== Week 14: at San Francisco 49ers ====
Week 14: Seattle Seahawks at San Francisco 49ers – Game summary

Quarter	1	2	3	4	Total
Seahawks	7	0	7	7	**21**
**49ers**	10	20	10	0	**40**

at Candlestick Park, San Francisco

- Date: December 12
- Game time: 1:05 p.m. local
- Game weather: Overcast, 55 °F (13 °C)
- Game attendance: 69,732
- Referee: Carl Cheffers
- TV announcers (Fox): Thom Brennaman and Brian Billick
- Recap, Game Book

Game information

**First quarter**

- SF – Vernon Davis 42-yard pass from Alex Smith (Jeff Reed kick), 12:33. 49ers 7–0. **Drive: 6 plays, 74 yards, 2:27.**
- SEA – Ruvell Martin 11-yard pass from Matt Hasselbeck (Olindo Mare kick), 4:14. Tied 7–7. **Drive: 7 plays, 52 yards, 3:47.**
- SF – Jeff Reed 33-yard field goal, 0:00. 49ers 10–7. **Drive: 9 plays, 59 yards, 4:14.**

**Second quarter**

- SF – Jeff Reed 44-yard field goal, 10:31. 49ers 13–7. **Drive: 7 plays, 19 yards, 2:52.**
- SF – Josh Morgan 15-yard pass from Alex Smith (Jeff Reed kick), 8:04. 49ers 20–7. **Drive: 3 plays, 17 yards, 0:55.**
- SF – Brian Westbrook 62-yard pass from Alex Smith (Jeff Reed kick), 1:50. 49ers 27–7. **Drive: 3 plays, 68 yards, 1:14.**
- SF – Jeff Reed 22-yard field goal, 0:00. 49ers 30–7. **Drive: 4 plays, 7 yards, 1:26.**

**Third quarter**

- SF – Dashon Goldson 39-yard interception return (Jeff Reed kick), 14:11. 49ers 37–7.
- SF – Jeff Reed 36-yard field goal, 3:32. 49ers 40–7. **Drive: 7 plays, 51 yards, 3:41.**
- SEA – Leon Washington 92-yard kickoff return (Olindo Mare kick), 3:18. 49ers 40–14.

**Fourth quarter**

- SEA – Deon Butler 2-yard pass from Matt Hasselbeck (Olindo Mare kick), 1:55. 49ers 40–21. **Drive: 9 plays, 80 yards, 3:11.**

**Top passers**

- SEA – Matt Hasselbeck – 27/42, 285 yards, 2 TD, 4 INT
- SF – Alex Smith – 17/27, 255 yards, 3 TD

**Top rushers**

- SEA – Michael Robinson – 3 rushes, 33 yards
- SF – Anthony Dixon – 14 rushes, 60 yards

**Top receivers**

- SEA – Ruvell Martin – 4 receptions, 73 yards, TD
- SF – Brian Westbrook – 6 receptions, 87 yards, TD

After their win over the Panthers the Seahawks flew to Candlestick Park for an NFC West rivalry match against the 49ers. The Seahawks trailed early with quarterback Alex Smith completing a 42-yard touchdown pass to tight end Vernon Davis, but they replied with quarterback Matt Hasselbeck throwing an 11-yard touchdown pass to wide receiver Ruvell Martin. They fell further behind when kicker Jeff Reed hit a 33 and a 44-yard field goal, followed by Smith completing a 15 and a 62-yard touchdown pass to Josh Morgan and Brian Westbrook respectively. This was followed by Reed making a 22-yard field goal, and in the third quarter with free safety Dashon Goldson returning an interception 39 yards for a touchdown. After that, Reed kicked a 36-yard field goal to put the 49ers up 40–7. The Seahawks tried to cut the lead down but only came away with running back Leon Washington returning the kickoff 92 yards for a touchdown, and in the fourth quarter with quarterback Matt Hasselbeck getting a 2-yard touchdown pass to wide receiver Deon Butler.

With the loss, Seattle fell to 6–7.

==== Week 15: vs. Atlanta Falcons ====
Week 15: Atlanta Falcons at Seattle Seahawks – Game summary

Quarter	1	2	3	4	Total
**Falcons**	0	17	17	0	**34**
Seahawks	7	3	0	8	**18**

at Qwest Field, Seattle

- Date: December 19
- Game time: 1:06 p.m. local
- Game weather: Clear, 45 °F (7 °C)
- Game attendance: 67,101
- Referee: Walt Coleman
- TV announcers (Fox): Sam Rosen and Tim Ryan
- Recap, Game Book

Game information

**First quarter**

- SEA – Marshawn Lynch 1-yard run (Olindo Mare kick), 7:28. Seahawks 7–0. **Drive: 12 plays, 80 yards, 7:32.**

**Second quarter**

- ATL – Jason Snelling 3-yard pass from Matt Ryan (Matt Bryant kick), 14:14. Tied 7–7. **Drive: 15 plays, 51 yards, 8:14.**
- ATL – Matt Bryant 27-yard field goal, 4:51. Falcons 10–7. **Drive: 14 plays, 51 yards, 7:16.**
- SEA – Olindo Mare 38-yard field goal, 2:05. Tied 10–10. **Drive: 4 plays, 7 yards, 1:55.**
- ATL – Michael Jenkins 24-yard pass from Matt Ryan (Matt Bryant kick), 0:19. Falcons 17–10. **Drive: 13 plays, 80 yards, 1:46.**

**Third quarter**

- ATL – Jonathan Babineaux recovered fumble in the end zone (Matt Bryant kick), 10:12. Falcons 24–10.
- ATL – Matt Bryant 25-yard field goal, 4:20. Falcons 27–10. **Drive: 8 plays, 30 yards, 4:05.**
- ATL – Roddy White 5-yard pass from Matt Ryan (Matt Bryant kick), 0:52. Falcons 34–10. **Drive: 4 plays, 21 yards, 2:20.**

**Fourth quarter**

- SEA – Charlie Whitehurst 1-yard run (Charlie Whitehurst–Ben Obomanu pass), 8:29. Falcons 34–18. **Drive: 11 plays, 88 yards, 4:40.**

**Top passers**

- ATL – Matt Ryan – 20/35, 174 yards, 3 TD, INT
- SEA – Charlie Whitehurst – 8/16, 83 yards

**Top rushers**

- ATL – Michael Turner – 25 rushes, 82 yards
- SEA – Marshawn Lynch – 12 rushes, 60 yards, TD

**Top receivers**

- ATL – Roddy White – 7 receptions, 65 yards, TD
- SEA – Mike Williams – 8 receptions, 66 yards

Hoping to rebound from their loss to the 49ers the Seahawks played on home ground for an NFC duel with the Falcons. In the first quarter the Seahawks took the lead with running back Marshawn Lynch getting a 1-yard touchdown run, with the Falcons replying with quarterback Matt Ryan making a 3-yard touchdown pass to fullback Jason Snelling. The Seahawks trailed slightly with kicker Matt Bryant hitting a 27-yard field goal, but managed to tie the game with kicker Olindo Mare nailing a 38-yard field goal. They struggled to keep up after Ryan completed a 24-yard touchdown pass to wide receiver Michael Jenkins, followed by quarterback Matt Hasselbeck losing the ball in the endzone which was picked up by defensive tackle Jonathan Babineaux for a touchdown. This was followed by Bryant getting a 25-yard field goal, and then with Ryan getting a 5-yard touchdown pass to wide receiver Roddy White. The Seahawks tried to cut the lead, but only came away with quarterback Charlie Whitehurst scrambling a yard for a touchdown.

With the loss, Seattle fell to 6–8.

==== Week 16: at Tampa Bay Buccaneers ====
Week 16: Seattle Seahawks at Tampa Bay Buccaneers – Game summary

Quarter	1	2	3	4	Total
Seahawks	7	0	0	8	**15**
**Buccaneers**	3	14	14	7	**38**

at Raymond James Stadium, Tampa, Florida

- Date: December 26
- Game time: 4:16 p.m. local
- Game weather: Cloudy, 49 °F (9 °C)
- Game attendance: 46,576
- Referee: Clete Blakeman
- TV announcers (Fox): Thom Brennaman and Brian Billick (blacked out locally)
- Recap, Game Book

Game information

**First quarter**

- SEA – Matt Hasselbeck 1-yard run (Olindo Mare kick), 2:50. Seahawks 7–0. **Drive: 11 plays, 62 yards, 5:53.**
- TB – Connor Barth 46-yard field goal, 0:25. Seahawks 7–3. **Drive: 4 plays, −11 yards, 2:25.**

**Second quarter**

- TB – Kellen Winslow 10-yard pass from Josh Freeman (Connor Barth kick), 12:23. Buccaneers 10–7. **Drive: 6 plays, 52 yards, 2:27.**
- TB – Mike Williams 10-yard pass from Josh Freeman (Connor Barth kick), 6:17. Buccaneers 17–7. **Drive: 6 plays, 52 yards, 2:27.**

**Third quarter**

- TB – Kellen Winslow 21-yard pass from Josh Freeman (Connor Barth kick), 6:38. Buccaneers 24–7. **Drive: 10 plays, 98 yards, 6:50.**
- TB – Mike Williams 7-yard pass from Josh Freeman (Connor Barth kick), 1:28. Buccaneers 31–7. **Drive: 3 plays, 56 yards, 1:44.**

**Fourth quarter**

- SEA – Leon Washington 16-yard run (Charlie Whitehurst–Ben Obomanu pass), 10:14. Buccaneers 31–15. **Drive: 11 plays, 54 yards, 6:14.**
- TB – Maurice Stovall 2-yard pass from Josh Freeman (Connor Barth kick), 7:56. Buccaneers 38–15. **Drive: 4 plays, 72 yards, 2:18.**

**Top passers**

- SEA – Charlie Whitehurst – 11/18, 66 yards
- TB – Josh Freeman – 21/26, 237 yards, 5 TD

**Top rushers**

- SEA – Marshawn Lynch – 14 rushes, 53 yards
- TB – LeGarrette Blount – 18 rushes, 164 yards

**Top receivers**

- SEA – John Carlson – 3 receptions, 27 yards
- TB – Kellen Winslow – 7 receptions, 98 yards, 2 TD

Hoping to rebound from their loss to the Falcons the Seahawks flew to Raymond James Stadium for an NFC duel with the Buccaneers. The Seahawks took the early lead with quarterback Matt Hasselbeck scrambling 1 yard for a touchdown, but failed to maintain this lead with kicker Connor Barth hitting a 46-yard field goal, followed by quarterback Josh Freeman completing a 10 and a 20-yard touchdown pass to tight end Kellen Winslow and to wide receiver Mike Williams. The Seahawks fell further behind when Freeman connected with Winslow and Williams again on a 21 and a 7-yard touchdown pass. The Seahawks tried to come back with running back Leon Washington getting a 16-yard touchdown run (with a successful two-point conversion as quarterback Charlie Whitehurst connected with wide receiver Ben Obomanu), but struggled to keep up as Freeman made a 2-yard touchdown pass to wide receiver Maurice Stovall.

With the loss, Seattle fell to 6–9.

==== Week 17: vs. St. Louis Rams ====
Week 17: St. Louis Rams at Seattle Seahawks – Game summary

Quarter	1	2	3	4	Total
Rams	0	3	3	0	**6**
**Seahawks**	7	0	3	6	**16**

at Qwest Field, Seattle

- Date: January 2
- Game time: 5:31 p.m. local
- Game weather: Clear, 34 °F (1 °C)
- Game attendance: 67,325
- Referee: Jerome Boger
- TV announcers (NBC): Al Michaels, Cris Collinsworth and Andrea Kremer
- Recap, Game Book

Game information

**First quarter**

- SEA – Mike Williams 4-yard pass from Charlie Whitehurst (Olindo Mare kick), 11:38. Seahawks 7–0. **Drive: 6 plays, 87 yards, 3:22.**

**Second quarter**

- STL – Josh Brown 32-yard field goal, 8:54. Seahawks 7–3. **Drive: 13 plays, 83 yards, 6:15.**

**Third quarter**

- STL – Josh Brown 27-yard field goal, 8:59. Seahawks 7–6. **Drive: 6 plays, 12 yards, 2:55.**
- SEA – Olindo Mare 31-yard field goal, 3:04. Seahawks 10–6. **Drive: 12 plays, 62 yards, 5:55.**

**Fourth quarter**

- SEA – Olindo Mare 31-yard field goal, 10:53. Seahawks 13–6. **Drive: 7 plays, 29 yards, 2:14.**
- SEA – Olindo Mare 34-yard field goal, 1:37. Seahawks 16–6. **Drive: 13 plays, 47 yards, 7:05.**

**Top passers**

- STL – Sam Bradford – 19/36, 155 yards, INT
- SEA – Charlie Whitehurst – 22/36, 192 yards, TD

**Top rushers**

- STL – Steven Jackson – 11 rushes, 45 yards
- SEA – Marshawn Lynch – 20 rushes, 75 yards

**Top receivers**

- STL – Steven Jackson – 4 receptions, 39 yards
- STL – Daniel Fells – 3 receptions, 39 yards
- SEA – Ruvell Martin – 3 receptions, 85 yards

Hoping to end their season on a positive note, the Seahawks went home for a Week 17 NFC West rematch with the St. Louis Rams, with the division title on the line. Seattle delivered the game's opening strike in the first quarter as quarterback Charlie Whitehurst found wide receiver Mike Williams on a 4-yard touchdown pass. The Rams answered in the second quarter with former Seahawks kicker Josh Brown making a 32-yard field goal.

St. Louis continued to pound away at Seattle's lead in the third quarter as Brown got a 27-yard field goal, but the Seahawks replied with a 31-yard field goal from kicker Olindo Mare. Afterwards, Seattle pulled away in the fourth quarter with Mare's 38-yard and 34-yard field goals.

With the win, not only did the Seahawks finish the regular season at 7–9, but they also won the NFC West for the first time since 2007 and secured the NFC's #4 seed. Also, Seattle became the first team in NFL history to make the playoffs in a non-strike season and become division champions with a losing record.

== Postseason ==
Seattle entered the postseason as the #4 seed in the NFC.

=== Schedule ===
Round	Date	Opponent (seed)	Result	Record	Venue	Recap
Wild Card	January 8, 2011	New Orleans Saints (5)	W 41–36	1–0	Qwest Field	Recap
Divisional	January 16, 2011	at Chicago Bears (2)	L 24–35	1–1	Soldier Field	Recap

=== Game summaries ===
==== NFC Wild Card Playoff: vs. #5 New Orleans Saints ====
NFC Wild Card Playoff: #5 New Orleans Saints at #4 Seattle Seahawks – Game summary

Quarter	1	2	3	4	Total
Saints	10	10	0	16	36
Seahawks	7	17	10	7	41

at Qwest Field, Seattle

- Date: January 8
- Game time: 1:35 p.m. local
- Game weather: Cloudy, 40 °F (4 °C)
- Game attendance: 66,336
- Referee: Walt Coleman
- TV announcers (NBC): Tom Hammond (play-by-play), Mike Mayock (color commentator) and Alex Flanagan (sideline reporter)
- Recap, Game Book

Game information

First quarter

- NO – Garrett Hartley 26-yard field goal, 11:43. Saints 3–0. Drive: 8 plays, 52 yards, 3:17.
- NO – Heath Evans 1-yard pass from Drew Brees (Garrett Hartley kick), 6:21. Saints 10–0. Drive: 8 plays, 35 yards, 4:11.
- SEA – John Carlson 11-yard pass from Matt Hasselbeck (Olindo Mare kick), 3:38. Saints 10–7. Drive: 6 plays, 57 yards, 2:43.

Second quarter

- NO – Julius Jones 5-yard run (Garrett Hartley kick), 13:38. Saints 17–7. Drive: 10 plays, 83 yards, 5:00.
- SEA – John Carlson 7-yard pass from Matt Hasselbeck (Olindo Mare kick), 11:00. Saints 17–14. Drive: 5 plays, 70 yards, 2:38.
- SEA – Olindo Mare 29-yard field goal, 7:03. Tied 17–17. Drive: 4 plays, 8 yards, 1:47.
- SEA – Brandon Stokley 45-yard pass from Matt Hasselbeck (Olindo Mare kick), 1:15. Seahawks 24–17. Drive: 9 plays, 76 yards, 3:48.
- NO – Garrett Hartley 22-yard field goal, 0:00. Seahawks 24–20. Drive: 11 plays, 77 yards, 1:15.

Third quarter

- SEA – Mike Williams 38-yard pass from Matt Hasselbeck (Olindo Mare kick), 11:48. Seahawks 31–20. Drive: 7 plays, 79 yards, 3:12.
- SEA – Olindo Mare 39 field goal, 5:27. Seahawks 34–20. Drive: 9 plays, 33 yards, 4:12.

Fourth quarter

- NO – Julius Jones 4-yard run (Garrett Hartley kick), 13:11. Seahawks 34–27. Drive: 12 plays, 87 yards, 4:41.
- NO – Garrett Hartley 21-yard field goal, 9:13. Seahawks 34–30. Drive: 8 plays, 53 yards, 3:27.
- SEA – Marshawn Lynch 67-yard run (Olindo Mare kick), 3:22. Seahawks 41–30. Drive: 2 plays, 67 yards, 0:58.
- NO – Devery Henderson 6-yard pass from Drew Brees (run failed), 1:30. Seahawks 41–36. Drive: 9 plays, 70 yards, 1:52.

Top passers

- NO – Drew Brees – 39/60, 404 yards, 2 TD
- SEA – Matt Hasselbeck – 22/35, 272 yards, 4 TD, INT

Top rushers

- NO – Julius Jones – 15 rushes, 59 yards, 2 TD
- SEA – Marshawn Lynch – 19 rushes, 131 yards, TD

Top receivers

- NO – Devery Henderson – 7 receptions, 77 yards, TD
- SEA – Brandon Stokley – 4 receptions, 73 yards, TD

Entering the postseason as the NFC's #4 seed, the Seahawks began their playoff run at home in the NFC Wild Card Round against the #5 New Orleans Saints in a rematch of their Week 11 duel. Seattle trailed early in the first quarter as Saints kicker Garrett Hartley got a 26-yard field goal, followed by quarterback Drew Brees completing a 1-yard touchdown pass to fullback Heath Evans. The Seahawks answered with quarterback Matt Hasselbeck finding tight end John Carlson on an 11-yard touchdown pass. New Orleans responded in the second quarter with running back Julius Jones getting a 5-yard touchdown run, but Seattle would take the lead in the 2nd quarter with Hasselbeck connecting with Carlson again on a 7-yard touchdown pass, Mare booting a 29-yard field goal, and Hasselbeck hooking up with wide receiver Brandon Stokley on a 45-yard touchdown pass. The Saints closed out the half with Hartley getting a 22-yard field goal.

The Seahawks added onto their lead in the third quarter as Hasselbeck found wide receiver Mike Williams on a 38-yard touchdown pass, followed by a 39-yard field goal from Mare. New Orleans ate away at their deficit in the fourth quarter with Jones' 4-yard touchdown run and Hartley's 21-yard field goal, but Seattle came right back with a 67-yard touchdown run from running back Marshawn Lynch. The Saints tried to rally with Brees completing a 6-yard touchdown pass to wide receiver Devery Henderson (with a failed two-point conversion), but a failed onside kick helped preserve Seattle's victory.

With the win, not only did the Seahawks improve their overall record to 8–9, but they became the first sub-.500 team in NFL history to win a playoff game as well as dethroning the defending world champion Saints from further playoff contention.

It was later determined that crowd activity and noise was so great, specifically during Marshawn Lynch's game-clinching touchdown run (commonly referred to as the Beast Quake), that a nearby seismic monitoring station registered a small tremor located at Qwest Field. With the win, the Seahawks had a 6–3 record at home for the season. Seahawks go to the NFC Divisional Round but lost to the Bears 35–24.

==== NFC Divisional Playoff: at #2 Chicago Bears ====
NFC Divisional Playoff: #4 Seattle Seahawks at #2 Chicago Bears – Game summary

Quarter	1	2	3	4	Total
Seahawks	0	0	3	21	24
Bears	14	7	7	7	35

at Soldier Field, Chicago, Illinois

- Date: January 16
- Game time: 12:05 p.m. local
- Game weather: Cloudy, 24 °F (−4 °C)
- Game attendance: 62,265
- Referee: Alberto Riveron
- TV announcers (Fox): Kenny Albert, Daryl Johnston and Tony Siragusa
- Recap, Game Book

Game information

First quarter

- CHI – Greg Olsen 58-yard pass from Jay Cutler (Robbie Gould kick), 12:08. Bears 7–0. Drive: 3 plays, 66 yards, 1:17.
- CHI – Chester Taylor 1-yard run (Robbie kick), 1:19. Bears 14–0. Drive: 8 plays, 50 yards, 4:05.

Second quarter

- CHI – Jay Cutler 6-yard run (Robbie Gould kick), 10:01. Bears 21–0. Drive: 9 plays, 63 yards, 4:11.

Third quarter

- CHI – Jay Cutler 9-yard run (Robbie Gould kick), 4:12. Bears 28–0. Drive: 14 plays, 70 yards, 7:59.
- SEA – Olindo Mare 30-yard field goal, 1:52. Bears 28–3. Drive: 7 plays, 18 yards, 2:20.

Fourth quarter

- SEA – Mike Williams 2-yard pass from Matt Hasselbeck (Olindo Mare kick), 11:21. Bears 28–10. Drive: 9 plays, 33 yards, 2:01.
- CHI – Kellen Davis 39-yard pass from Jay Cuter (Olindo Mare kick), 4:40. Bears 35–10. Drive: 3 plays, 48 yards, 1:37.
- SEA – Mike Williams 3-yard pass from Matt Hasselbeck (Olindo Mare kick), 2:16. Bears 35–17. Drive: 7 plays, 74 yards, 2:24.
- SEA – Brandon Stokley 9-yard pass from Matt Hasselbeck (Olindo Mare kick), 1:24. Bears 35–24. Drive: 2 plays, 55 yards, 0:27.

Top passers

- SEA – Matt Hasselbeck – 26/46, 274 yards, 3 TD
- CHI – Jay Cutler – 15/28, 274 yards, 2 TD

Top rushers

- SEA – Golden Tate – 1 rush, 13 yards
- CHI – Matt Forte – 25 rushes, 80 yards

Top receivers

- SEA – Brandon Stokley – 8 receptions, 85 yards, TD
- CHI – Greg Olsen – 3 receptions, 113 yards, TD

Coming off their win over the Saints, the Seahawks flew to Soldier Field for the NFC Divisional Round against the #2 Chicago Bears, in a rematch of their Week 6 matchup. Seattle trailed early in the first quarter as Bear quarterback Jay Cutler completed a 58-yard touchdown pass to tight end Greg Olsen, followed by running back Chester Taylor getting a 1-yard touchdown run. Chicago added onto their lead in the second quarter as Cutler got a 6-yard touchdown run.

The Bears continued their dominating day in the third quarter as Cutler got a 9-yard touchdown run. Seattle finally answered with a 30-yard field goal from kicker Olindo Mare. The Seahawks tried to rally in the fourth quarter as quarterback Matt Hasselbeck found wide receiver Mike Williams on a 38-yard touchdown pass, but Chicago pulled away with Cutler completing a 39-yard touchdown pass to tight end Kellen Davis. Seattle continued to try to rally as Hasselbeck connected with Williams again on a 3-yard touchdown pass, followed by a 9-yard touchdown pass to wide receiver Brandon Stokley, but the Bears held on to preserve the win.

With the loss, the Seahawks' season came to an end with an overall record at 8–10. The Seahawks followed a loss to forget and in 2011 they missed the playoffs with a record of 7–9.
