= Beast Quake =

American football running play in a 2010 NFC wild card playoff game

Coordinates: 47.59482°N 122.33193°W

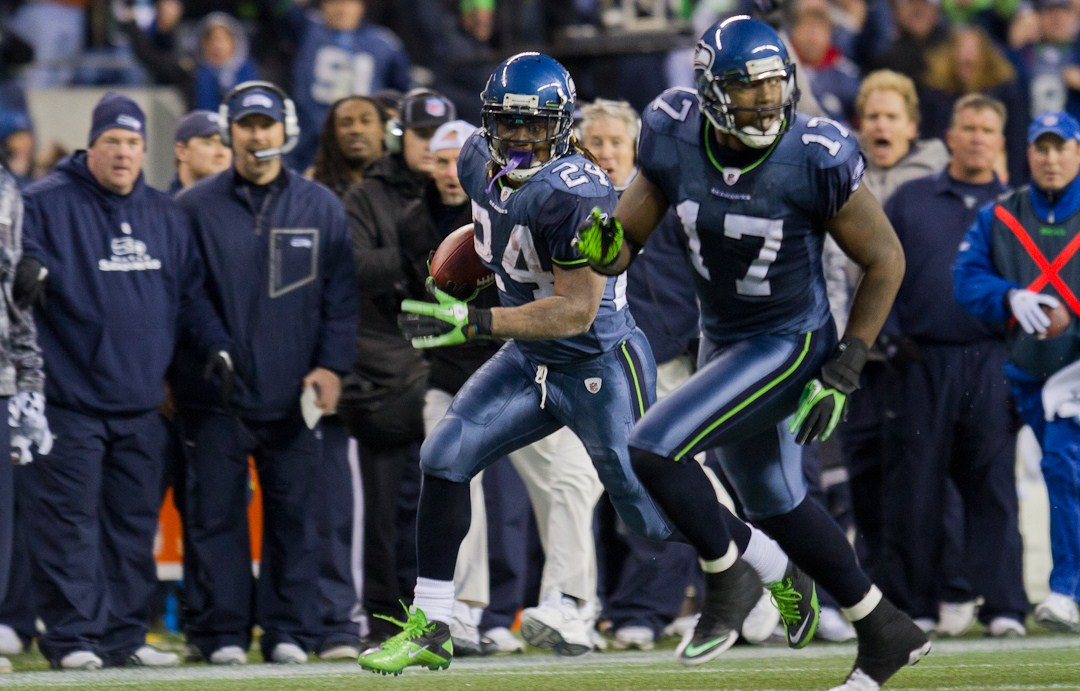
- Marshawn Lynch (Number 24) runs with Mike Williams during the "Beast Quake"
New Orleans Saints (5) (11–5)	Seattle Seahawks (4) (7–9)
36	41
Head coach: Sean Payton	Head coach: Pete Carroll
	1	2	3	4	Total
NO	10	10	0	16	36
SEA	7	17	10	7	41
- Date: January 8, 2011
- Stadium: Qwest Field; Seattle, Washington
- Favorite: Saints by 10
- Referee: Walt Coleman
- Attendance: 66,336

TV in the United States
- Network: NBC
- Announcers: Tom Hammond, Mike Mayock and Alex Flanagan

The Beast Quake was a National Football League (NFL) touchdown scored by Seattle Seahawks running back Marshawn Lynch against the New Orleans Saints during a 2010–11 NFC Wild Card playoff game. Occurring in the fourth quarter while Seattle was up by four points, Lynch rushed for 67 yards and broke nine tackles to score a touchdown, which secured the Seahawks' eventual 41–36 upset victory. The play's name comes from Lynch's nickname "Beast Mode" and the subsequent celebration of Seahawks fans registering at magnitude 2.0 on a nearby seismometer.

== Background ==
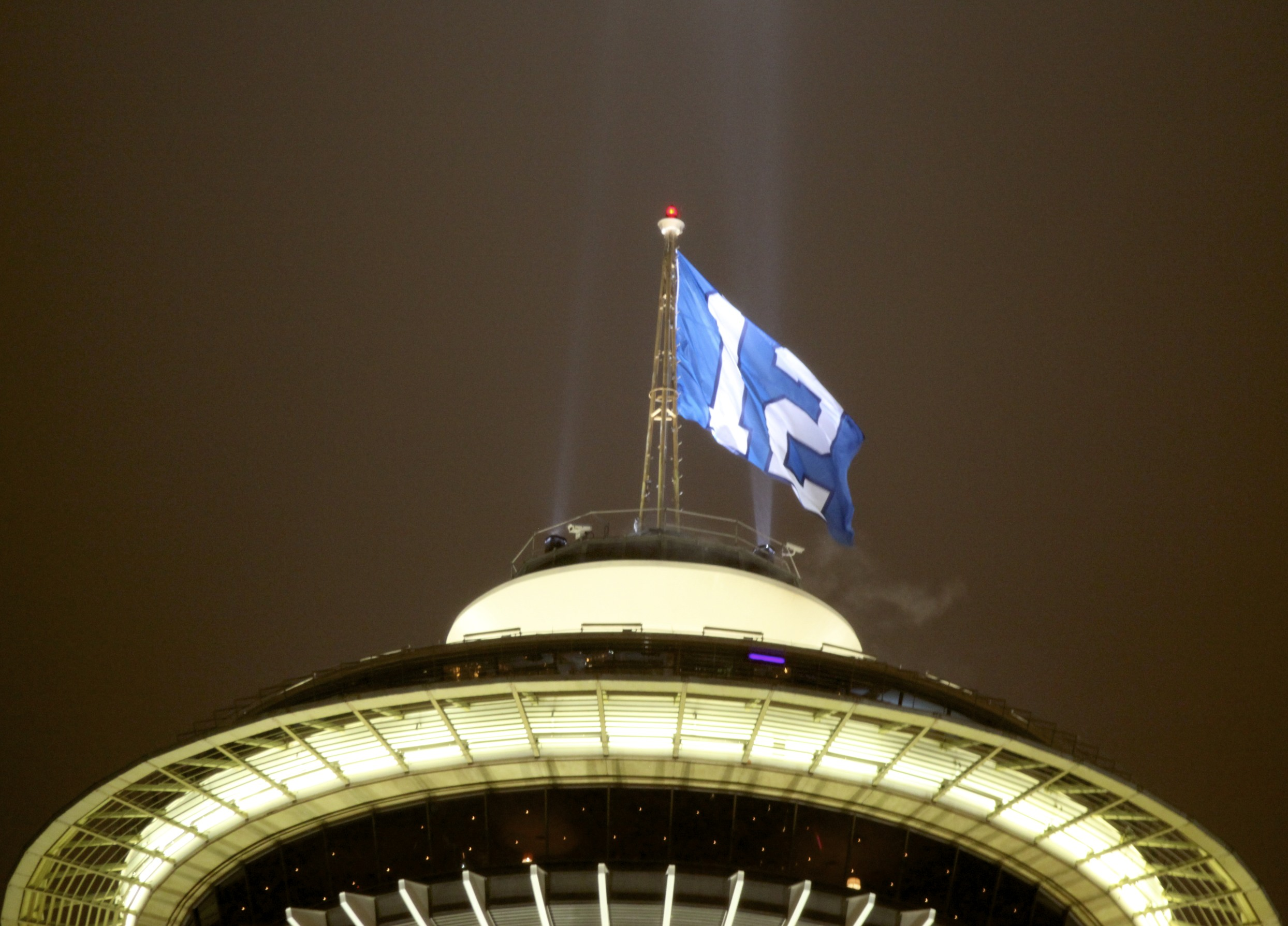
12th man flag flying on the Space Needle the day of the game

The Saints came into the game as the 5th-seeded wild card in the NFC. They had an 11–5 record for the season. The Seahawks had won the NFC West division with only a 7–9 record, making them the first team to reach the NFL playoffs with a losing record since the Browns and Lions each made the postseason in the strike-shortened 16-team 1982 postseason. The two teams had previously met during Week 11 of the regular season in New Orleans, with the Saints winning 34–19.

Two early Seahawks miscues enabled the Saints to build a 10-point lead. By halftime, the Seahawks led 24–20. The Seahawks increased their lead to 31–20 on their opening drive of the second half. The Saints trailed 34–27 with 13:11 left. Then they forced a three-and-out and got the ball back on their 44-yard line, but the Seahawks' defense halted the drive at the 3-yard line, where the Saints settled for Hartley's third field goal to cut the lead to 34–30. After an exchange of punts, the Seahawks got the ball with 4:20 left in the game. On the first play of the drive, Lynch was stuffed for no gain. The Seahawks faced a 2nd and 10 at their own 33 yard line, protecting a 4-point lead with 3:38 remaining.

== The run ==
Track of the run

With their base offense on the field, the Seahawks called "17 Power", a power run, for the first time in the game. The Seahawks lined up in an I formation with tight end Carlson on the left and fullback Michael Robinson offset to the left. The Saints lined up in a 2–5 "under" front with strong safety Roman Harper crowding the line of scrimmage, putting eight defenders near the box. Hasselbeck motioned wide receiver Ben Obomanu from the right to the left. At the snap, Seahawks right guard Mike Gibson also pulled to the left.

The Seahawks had called zone runs for most of the game, but this call required man-on-man blocking. Carlson was assigned to block Saints linebacker Jo-Lonn Dunbar, while left tackle Russell Okung was assigned to defensive end Will Smith and Obomanu to Harper. Left guard Tyler Polumbus and center Chris Spencer were to team up on defensive tackle Remi Ayodele and, ideally, push past him to block weak-side linebacker Scott Shanle. Robinson would push ahead and block Saints middle linebacker Jonathan Vilma, and Gibson would be free to lead Lynch and deal with any unblocked defenders. Meanwhile, on the right side of the formation, right tackle Sean Locklear would try to cut off defensive tackle Sedrick Ellis, and defensive end Alex Brown would be left unblocked on the outside.

As the play actually developed, the Saints were effective in frustrating the blocking scheme. Dunbar pushed Carlson back and prevented Gibson from reaching the point of attack. Polumbus and Spencer were able to turn Ayodele away, but neither was able to get off his block and challenge Shanle, who correctly read the pulling guard and filled the gap. Lynch recalled, "So I see the guard coming around, and in my head, I'm thinking, backside A gap. But for some reason, it carried me to the front side." Instead of rushing behind Gibson, Lynch rushed between Gibson and Robinson, finding an unblocked Shanle at the line of scrimmage. If Shanle had completed the tackle here, he would have limited Lynch to a 2-yard gain.

Instead, Lynch bounced away from Shanle's tackle, while also running through the grasp of Ellis and Will Smith. As Lynch broke through the line, Ayodele and Saints safety Darren Sharper simultaneously dove to pull Lynch down as he ran past them, but were unsuccessful. Jabari Greer then caught up with Lynch from behind and tried to wrap him up, but could not hang on. Lynch then angled toward the right sideline, pursued by Tracy Porter, who was stiff armed to the ground by Lynch. Brown lunged for Lynch's heels, but fell short. Finally, Harper, being blocked by Polumbus, attempted one last diving tackle inside the 5 yard line. Already celebrating, Lynch leapt backwards into the endzone, with his right arm holding the ball aloft and his left hand grabbing his crotch, for the touchdown.

== Aftermath ==
Seismograph readings from Lynch's touchdown run

With 1:52 left, Brees struck back with a 6-yard touchdown pass to Henderson, but the 2-point conversion failed, keeping the score at 41–36. Carlson sealed the victory by recovering Hartley's onside kick attempt, enabling the Seahawks to run out the clock.

It was later determined that crowd activity and noise was so great during Lynch's game-clinching touchdown run that a nearby Pacific Northwest Seismic Network station registered a small tremor, M=2.0 located at Qwest Field. With the win, the Seahawks had a 6–3 record at home for the season.

In 2012, the NFL revealed that the Saints put bounties on several Seahawks players during this game, including Hasselbeck, Lynch, and Williams.

=== Beast Quake 2.0 ===
During a 2014 game against the Arizona Cardinals on the road, Lynch had a similar run, beating several would-be tacklers on his way to a career-long 79-yard touchdown.

== Similar incidents ==
=== RaveQuake ===
PNSN has also recorded seismic activity from Seattle Sounders FC fans as they also play at Lumen Field; multiple seismic events were recorded on November 10, 2019, during the MLS Cup final between the Sounders and Toronto FC. These events were referred to as "RaveQuakes" by the Pacific Northwest Seismic Network and some media outlets. Further "RaveQuakes" were recorded on May 4, 2022, during the second leg of the CONCACAF Champions League Final between the Sounders and Pumas UNAM.

=== Swift Quake ===
The "Swift Quake", which was compared to the Beast Quake by the Pacific Northwest Seismic Network, was a 2.3 magnitude event at Lumen Field in Seattle during Taylor Swift's Seattle dates during The Eras Tour in 2023. According to Jackie Caplan-Auerbach, a seismologist at Western Washington University, the shaking of the ground on both July 22 and 23 was more than "twice as hard" as in the 2011 Seahawks game. The Swift Quake had a 0.3 greater magnitude than the Beast Quake.

=== Mariners 2025 postseason run ===
During the 2025 Major League Baseball postseason, the Pacific Northwest Seismic Network installed a seismometer inside T-Mobile Park, home of the Seattle Mariners. During game 5 of the American League Divisional Series on October 10, Jorge Polanco's 15th inning walk-off registered as a magnitude 3.0. Because the Richter scale is logarithmic, this means the shaking was ten times stronger than the Beast Quake. One week later during game 5 of the American League Championship Series, Eugenio Suárez's grand slam in the bottom of the 8th inning "registered three times higher in terms of activity than Polanco's walk-off", meaning it measured around 3.2 on the Richter scale.

== See also ==
- Earthquake Game, a 1988 college football game in which crowd reactions also registered on a seismometer.
