= Charlie Whitehurst =

American football player (born 1982)

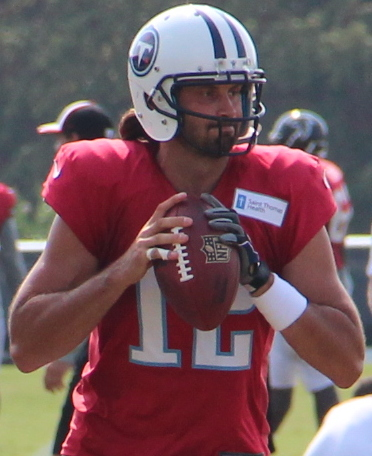
- Whitehurst with the Tennessee Titans in 2014

No. 6, 12, 15
- Position: Quarterback

Personal information
- Born: August 6, 1982 (age 44); Green Bay, Wisconsin, U.S.
- Listed height: 6 ft 5 in (1.96 m)
- Listed weight: 226 lb (103 kg)

Career information
- High school: Chattahoochee (Alpharetta, Georgia)
- College: Clemson (2001–2005)
- NFL draft: 2006: 3rd round, 81st overall pick

Career history
- San Diego Chargers (2006–2009); Seattle Seahawks (2010–2011); San Diego Chargers (2012–2013); Tennessee Titans (2014–2015); Indianapolis Colts (2015); Cleveland Browns (2016)

Awards and highlights
- Second-team All-ACC (2005)

Career NFL statistics
- Passing attempts: 396
- Passing completions: 219
- Completion percentage: 55.3%
- Passing yards: 2,463
- TD–INT: 11–8
- Passer rating: 74.9
- Stats at Pro Football Reference

Charles David Whitehurst Jr. (born August 6, 1982), is an American former professional football player who was a quarterback in the National Football League (NFL). He played college football for the Clemson Tigers, and was selected by the San Diego Chargers in the third round of the 2006 NFL draft. Nicknamed "Clipboard Jesus", Whitehurst also played for the Seattle Seahawks, Tennessee Titans, Indianapolis Colts and Cleveland Browns.

== Early life ==
Born in Green Bay, Wisconsin, Whitehurst attended Chattahoochee High School in Alpharetta, Georgia and was a three-year letterman in football and a four-year letterman in baseball.

== College career ==
While playing college football at Clemson, Whitehurst became the first quarterback to go 4–0 in the rivalry between Clemson and the University of South Carolina, including a 63–17 rout of the Gamecocks in Columbia on November 22, 2003.

The following year, he was used as a multiple weapon by coach Tommy Bowden and the Tigers offense. In addition to passing for 2,067 yards, seven touchdowns, and 17 interceptions, he had one punt for 25 yards and also had a two-yard reception. Whitehurst graduated from Clemson in December 2004 with a bachelor's degree in marketing and began graduate school by the start of his senior season in 2005. Whitehurst left Clemson with 9,665 passing yards, 49 touchdowns and 46 interceptions and a 124.2 quarterback rating. On the ground, he gained 98 yards on 266 attempts and 10 touchdowns.

== Professional career ==
Pre-draft measurables
Height	Weight	Arm length	Hand span	40-yard dash	10-yard split	20-yard split	20-yard shuttle	Three-cone drill	Vertical jump	Broad jump	Wonderlic
6 ft 4 3/4 in (1.95 m)	223 lb (101 kg)	32 3/8 in (0.82 m)	9 3/8 in (0.24 m)	4.75 s	1.67 s	2.77 s	4.11 s	7.00 s	33.0 in (0.84 m)	9 ft 4 in (2.84 m)	33
All values from NFL Combine

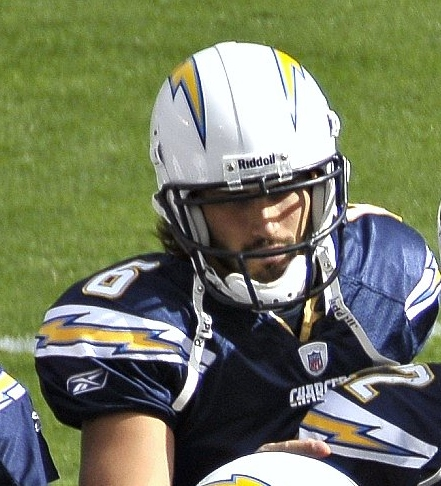
Whitehurst with the San Diego Chargers in 2008

=== San Diego Chargers (first stint) ===
Whitehurst was drafted by the San Diego Chargers in the third round (81st overall) of the 2006 NFL draft. He played in two regular season games as the third-stringer to Billy Volek and starter Philip Rivers.

His first career appearance was in Week 2 against the Tennessee Titans in 2006. Whitehurst rushed once for 14 yards and a touchdown in a 40–7 win. His second appearance came in Week 5 at San Francisco, which also resulted in a win, 48–19. He had one rush for a one-yard loss. He entered two more games but did not record a stat, Week 8 against the Cleveland Browns (a 32–25 win) and Week 12 in a 24–21 win against the Buffalo Bills. From 2007 to 2009, he did not enter another NFL game.

=== Seattle Seahawks ===
Whitehurst was traded to the Seattle Seahawks on March 17, 2010, in exchange for a 2011 third-round draft pick to San Diego, and the two teams switched second-round picks in the 2010 NFL draft. He was signed to a two-year, $8 million contract. Seattle's front office later stated they had already picked up a potential franchise quarterback in the draft by acquiring Whitehurst with the 2011 selection.

On November 7, 2010, Whitehurst made his first-career start and completed 12-of-23 passes for 113 yards with a touchdown and two interceptions in a Week 9 loss against the New York Giants due to an injury suffered by starting quarterback Matt Hasselbeck.

Whitehurst started on January 2, 2011, in a Sunday Night Football game against the division rival St. Louis Rams to determine the NFC West champion. Whitehurst was five-for-five for 85 yards on the opening drive and finished the first half going 16-for-21 with 138 yards and one touchdown. He finished the game 22-of-36 and 192 yards as the Seahawks clinched their division. Hasselbeck returned as the starter for the subsequent playoff game.

Prior to the 2011 preseason, Whitehurst was named the backup to Tarvaris Jackson, the former Vikings quarterback whom Seattle acquired in the 2011 offseason. However, Jackson and Whitehurst were expected to compete for the starting job once Whitehurst became familiar with the new offensive schemes. Whitehurst went 14-of-19 passing with one touchdown to put Seattle on the board against the Vikings in 2011's second preseason action. Whitehurst took over for an injured Jackson during a Week 5 matchup at the New York Giants. In that game, Whitehurst outscored Jackson's 14 points in the first three quarters by putting up 20 points in the fourth quarter, going 11-for-19, 149 yards, and a 27-yard touchdown pass to Doug Baldwin, securing a 36–25 Seattle victory. Coach Pete Carroll named Whitehurst the starting quarterback until Jackson healed from a pectoral injury, although no official date of Jackson's medical clearance had been released. Whitehurst was named the starter for Week 7 against the Cleveland Browns, because Jackson had suffered a pectoral injury against the Giants. Whitehurst went 12-of-30 for 92 yards, with no touchdowns and two turnovers. Whitehurst started in Week 8 against the Cincinnati Bengals, but was benched for an injured Jackson after going 4-of-7 for 52 yards.

=== San Diego Chargers (second stint) ===
On March 16, 2012, Whitehurst signed a two-year contract to reunite with his former team, the Chargers.

=== Tennessee Titans ===
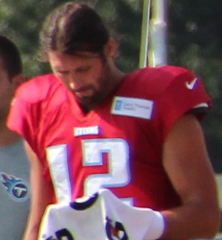
Whitehurst with the Titans in 2014

On March 13, 2014, Whitehurst signed a two-year contract with the Tennessee Titans replacing Ryan Fitzpatrick as the backup quarterback. Whitehurst made the start in Week 4 against the Indianapolis Colts after Jake Locker's injury, his first start since Week 8 of the 2011 season. Whitehurst appeared in seven games with five starts and recorded career-highs in completions (105), pass attempts (185), passing yards (1,326), touchdowns (seven), and an 87.4 passer rating while rushing 20 times for 90 yards. He recorded a career-high two touchdown passes against the Cleveland Browns on October 5, 2014. He posted a career-best 287 passing yards against the Jacksonville Jaguars on December 18, 2014.

Whitehurst was waived by the team on November 11, 2015.

=== Indianapolis Colts ===
On November 12, 2015, Whitehurst was claimed off waivers by the Indianapolis Colts. Whitehurst's best game of the season was on December 27, 2015, against the Miami Dolphins, completing 9-of-14 passes for 78 yards and a 78.9 passer rating. He appeared in four games for the Colts before being placed on injured reserve on December 28, 2015.

=== Cleveland Browns ===
Whitehurst signed with the Cleveland Browns on September 19, 2016. After starting quarterback Cody Kessler was injured in the first quarter of the Week 5 game against the New England Patriots, Whitehurst completed 14-of-24 passes for 182 yards with a touchdown and an interception as the Browns lost by a score of 33–13. Whitehurst also hyperextended his left knee late in the fourth quarter but returned for the final play of the game, which was a kneel down. On October 11, 2016, he was released by the Browns with an injury settlement.

== Career statistics ==
=== NFL ===
==== Regular season ====
Year	Team	Games			Passing								Rushing				Sacks		Fumbles (Note: Fumbles lost data taken from Pro Football Reference career game log)	
Year	Team	GP	GS	Record	Cmp	Att	Pct	Yds	Y/A	TD	Int	Rtg	Att	Yds	Avg	TD	Sck	SckY	Fum	Lost
2006	SD	2	0	–	0	0	0.0	0	0.0	0	0	0.0	2	13	6.5	1	0	0	0	0
2007	SD	0	0	DNP																
2008	SD	0	0	DNP																
2009	SD	0	0	DNP																
2010	SEA	6	2	1–1	57	99	57.6	507	5.1	2	3	65.5	20	43	2.2	1	5	13	2	0
2011	SEA	3	2	0–2	27	56	48.2	298	5.3	1	1	62.9	4	13	3.3	0	8	46	2	1
2012	SD	0	0	DNP																
2013	SD	2	0	–	0	0	0.0	0	0.0	0	0	0.0	6	−5	−0.8	0	0	0	0	0
2014	TEN	7	5	1–4	105	185	56.8	1,326	7.2	7	2	87.4	20	90	4.5	0	18	103	3	0
2015	TEN	0	0	DNP																
2015	IND	4	0	–	16	32	50.0	150	4.7	0	1	50.3	2	1	0.5	0	5	28	0	0
2016	CLE	1	0	–	14	24	58.3	182	7.6	1	1	78.8	2	1	0.5	0	2	14	0	0
Career		25	9	2–7	219	396	55.3	2,463	6.2	11	8	74.9	56	156	2.8	2	38	204	7	1

==== Playoffs ====
Year	Team	Games			Passing								Rushing				Sacks		Fumbles	
Year	Team	GP	GS	Record	Cmp	Att	Pct	Yds	Y/A	TD	Int	Rtg	Att	Yds	Avg	TD	Sck	SckY	Fum	Lost
2006	SD	0	0	DNP																
2007	SD	0	0	DNP																
2008	SD	0	0	DNP																
2009	SD	0	0	DNP																
2010	SEA	0	0	DNP																
2013	SD	0	0	DNP																

=== College ===
Season	Team	Passing								Rushing			
Season	Team	Cmp	Att	Pct	Yds	Y/A	TD	Int	Rtg	Att	Yds	Avg	TD
2002	Clemson	123	214	57.5	1,554	7.3	10	6	128.3	43	−20	−0.5	2
2003	Clemson	288	465	61.9	3,561	7.7	21	13	135.6	92	49	0.5	4
2004	Clemson	177	349	50.7	2,067	5.9	7	17	97.3	81	43	0.5	1
2005	Clemson	229	340	67.4	2,483	7.3	11	10	133.5	50	26	0.5	3
Career		817	1,368	59.7	9,665	7.1	49	46	124.2	266	98	0.4	10

== Personal life ==
Whitehurst's father, David Whitehurst, played quarterback for the Green Bay Packers from 1977 to 1983 and the Kansas City Chiefs in 1984. Whitehurst's sister, Carrie, also went to Clemson, where she was a forward on the Clemson Tigers' women's basketball team. Whitehurst's nickname is "Clipboard Jesus," given to him for his long hair and lengthy career as a backup quarterback.
