= Mike Williams (wide receiver, born 1984) =

American football player (born 1984)

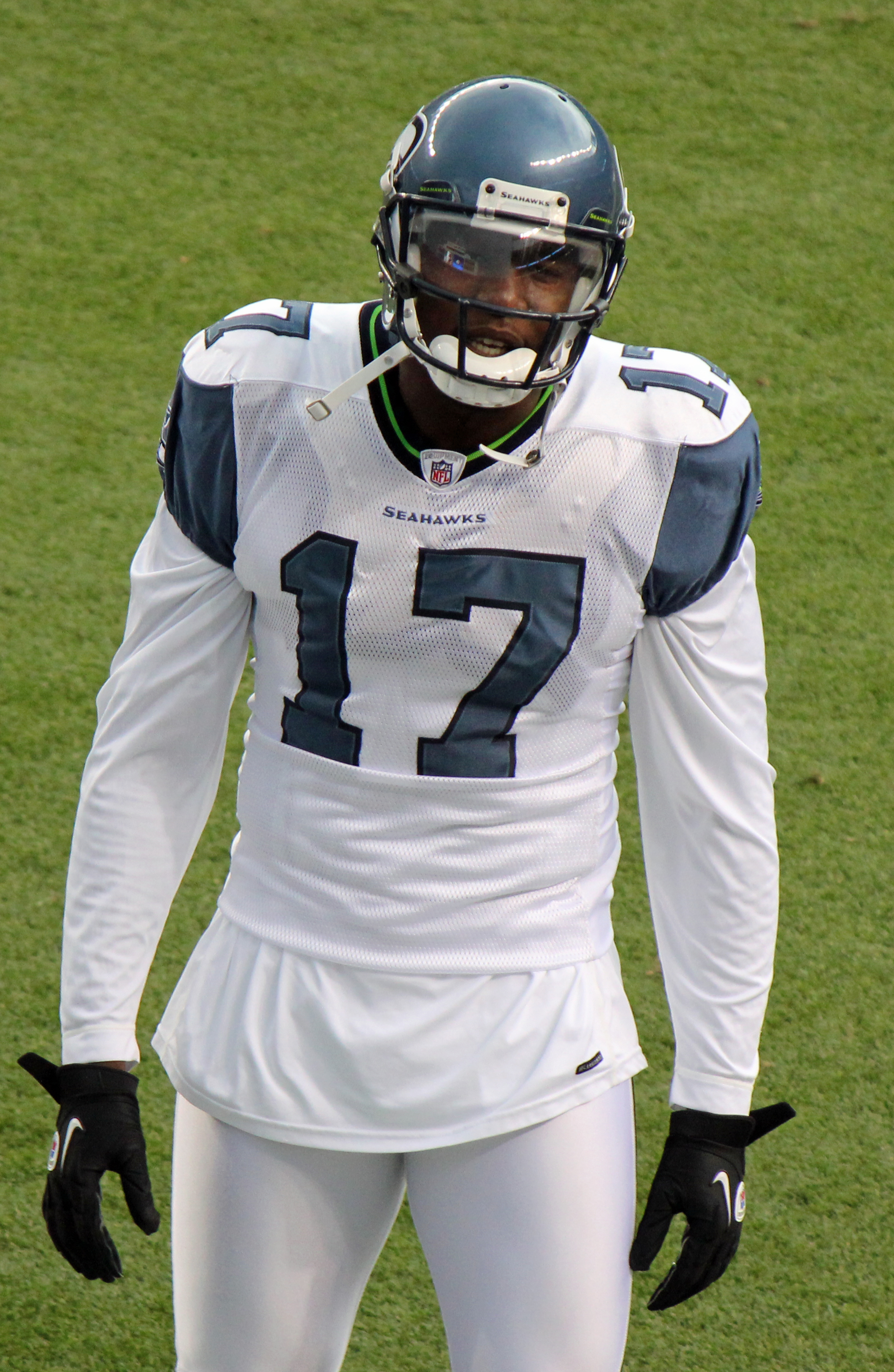
- Williams with the Seattle Seahawks in 2011

No. 88, 17, 18
- Position: Wide receiver

Personal information
- Born: January 4, 1984 (age 42); Tampa, Florida, U.S.
- Listed height: 6 ft 5 in (1.96 m)
- Listed weight: 235 lb (107 kg)

Career information
- High school: Henry B. Plant (Tampa)
- College: USC (2002–2003)
- NFL draft: 2005: 1st round, 10th overall pick

Career history
- Detroit Lions (2005–2006); Oakland Raiders (2007); Tennessee Titans (2007); Seattle Seahawks (2010–2011); Toronto Argonauts (2013)*
- * Offseason or practice squad member only

Awards and highlights
- Consensus first-team All-American (2003); First-team All-Pac-10 (2003); Second-team All-Pac-10 (2002)

Career NFL statistics
- Receptions: 127
- Receiving yards: 1,526
- Receiving touchdowns: 8
- Stats at Pro Football Reference

Michael Troy Williams (born January 4, 1984) is an American former professional football player who was a wide receiver in the National Football League (NFL). He played college football for the USC Trojans, receiving consensus All-American honors in 2003. The Detroit Lions selected him in first round of the 2005 NFL draft, and he also played in the NFL for the Oakland Raiders, Tennessee Titans, and Seattle Seahawks.

== Early life ==
Williams was born in Tampa, Florida. He attended Henry B. Plant High School in Tampa, and played both high school football and basketball for the Plant Panthers.

As a sophomore, Williams made 28 receptions for 631 yards (22.5 avg.) and 10 touchdowns. During his junior year, Williams made the all-state Class 4A second-team while making 35 receptions for 803 yards (22.9 avg.) and 14 touchdowns. As a senior, Williams had 38 receptions for 789 yards (20.8 average reception) with 14 touchdowns. Williams' honors included Tom Lemming All-American, Super Prep All-Dixie, PrepStar All-Southeast Region, St. Petersburg Times All-Suncoast second-team, and Tampa Tribune All-Hillsborough County.

Year	Team	G	Rec	Yards	Y/R	TD	LNG
1999	Henry B. Plant High School Panthers	–	28	631	22.5	10	–
2000	Henry B. Plant High School Panthers	–	35	803	22.9	14	–
2001	Henry B. Plant High School Panthers	–	38	789	20.8	14	–
Total		–	101	2,223	22.0	38	–

In basketball, Williams was a 4-year Starter, winning over 100 games. As a Senior in 2002, Williams was a McDonald's All American Finalist. He earned “Tampa Tribune” All Hillsborough County 1st Team, District Tournament MVP, Western Conference MVP, and 3rd Team All State selections. Williams averaged 16.9 points, 8.3 rebounds, and 4.6 assists. As a junior in 2001, Williams earned Tampa Tribune All-Hillsborough County first-team honors, averaging 14.7 points, 10.7 rebounds and 5.3 assists while helping his team to the state semifinals. As a Freshman, Williams started every game, averaging 12.6 points, 9.6 rebounds and 4.6 assists while leading the team in Blocks and Rebounds. Williams graduated as the All Time leader in Blocks and Rebounds in school history.

== College career ==
Williams attended the University of Southern California, where he played for coach Pete Carroll's USC Trojans football team from 2002 to 2003. Before attending USC, Williams was offered scholarships to Florida State University and the University of Florida, but neither school saw him as a wide receiver. Williams played split end wide receiver during most of his games for USC. Williams played in all 26 games during his freshman and sophomore years at USC, and started 15 of those games. He wore jersey No. 1 while on the football team.

His freshman season, he had 81 receptions for 1,265 yards and 14 touchdowns. These statistics are all USC and Pacific-10 Conference freshman records.

Williams was named First-team Freshman All-American choice by The Sporting News, Scripps/Football Writers, and Rivals.com. Selected as the Pac-10 Freshman of the Year, named to the All-Pac-10 second-team, All-American honorable mention, The Sporting News Freshman All-Pac-10 first-team, and The Sporting News All-Pac-10 Freshman Offensive Player of the Year.

In his final season, as a sophomore, Williams started all 13 games at wide receiver, and led the Trojans in receiving yards and touchdowns which resulted in 95 catches leading to 1,314 yards and 16 touchdowns. Williams was a finalist for the 2003 Biletnikoff Award (nation's top receiver) while finishing eighth in Heisman Trophy voting. He also earned first-team All-American (AP, ESPN.com, Football Writers, and SI.com among others) honors. Williams also was a 2003 All-Pac-10 First-team selection and CBS.Sportsline.com National Player of the Year. That year, he also completed two pass attempts for 38 yards and one touchdown against Michigan in the Rose Bowl, and blocked a field goal.

== Professional career ==
=== NFL draft controversy ===
Ohio State running back Maurice Clarett was suspended by his school following his 2002 freshman year. After being unable to gain reinstatement with Ohio State, Clarett made the decision to declare for the NFL draft. However, since Clarett was only of true sophomore eligibility, he had to legally challenge the NFL rule that a player must be three years removed from high school to be eligible for the NFL Draft. After a court proceeding, a federal judge ruled that the NFL could not legally bar Clarett from entering the 2004 NFL draft.

Williams, having completed his sophomore year and only two years removed from high school, made the decision to declare for the 2004 NFL Draft as well after hearing the federal judge's ruling. Williams hired an agent and moved forward presenting himself as a legitimate first round pick (and most, if not all, NFL pundits and NFL personnel agreed that Williams was a first round choice). By declaring his intent to enter the draft, hiring an agent to represent his interests, and filing the NFL paperwork necessary to enter the draft, he forfeited his remaining NCAA eligibility.

Before the 2004 NFL Draft, the United States Court of Appeals for the Second Circuit overturned the federal judge's decision allowing Clarett to enter the Draft. Additionally, the United States Supreme Court refused to hear a final appeal. Clarett and Williams were ineligible for the 2004 NFL Draft.

As Williams was ineligible for NCAA reinstatement, he was required to sit the entire 2004 football season and was not allowed to practice with USC as well.

Pre-draft measurables
Height	Weight	Arm length	Hand span	40-yard dash	10-yard split	20-yard split	20-yard shuttle	Three-cone drill	Vertical jump	Broad jump	Wonderlic
6 ft 4 5/8 in (1.95 m)	229 lb (104 kg)	34 1/8 in (0.87 m)	8 7/8 in (0.23 m)	4.56 s	1.66 s	2.70 s	4.23 s	6.98 s	38.5 in (0.98 m)	10 ft 3 in (3.12 m)	20
All values from USC Pro Day, except Ht, Wt, 40-yd dash (and splits), and Wonderlic, which are from NFL Combine.

=== Detroit Lions ===
Despite sitting out an entire season, Williams was selected tenth overall in the 2005 NFL Draft by the Detroit Lions, the third wide receiver drafted in the first round in as many years by the Lions. Williams selected jersey #88, which had been retired in honor of Hall of Fame tight end Charlie Sanders.

As a rookie in 2005, Williams, appeared in 14 games with four starts. Williams recorded his first touchdown catch in his NFL debut, a 3-yard pass from quarterback Joey Harrington, in the season opener against Green Bay. Williams made his first career start against the Ravens and had 1 reception for 7 yards. Williams had a career-long, 49-yard reception in Cleveland. He finished that game with 5 receptions for 95 yards. Williams then again started in Minnesota and had 4 receptions for 43 yards. Three-of-four receptions were for first downs. Williams was then inactive for the Lions game in Dallas due to an injured ankle. Williams had a season-high 6 receptions for 84 yards against Atlanta and had a 21-yard reception for a first down in New Orleans on the Lions opening drive.

He finished his rookie season with 29 receptions for 350 yards and 1 touchdown.

In 2006, Williams was on the inactive list for both of the Lions' first two games. He played in just eight games in the 2006 season, and made eight catches for 99 yards and one touchdown. During the Lions' Week 15 loss at Green Bay, Williams led the Lions in receiving yards after catching three passes for 42 yards. Williams caught two more passes in a Week 16 loss to Chicago, but posted several drops as well, and was unable to secure a potential game-winning touchdown pass thrown by Jon Kitna as time expired. During the Lions' Week 17 win on the road in Dallas, Williams caught two passes, including a fourth quarter 50-yard pass.

=== Oakland Raiders ===
Williams was traded along with Josh McCown to the Oakland Raiders during the first day of the 2007 NFL draft in exchange for a 2007 fourth-round pick which the Lions used to select A.J. Davis. In Oakland, Williams reunited with his former college position coach Lane Kiffin.

=== Tennessee Titans ===
Williams signed with the Tennessee Titans on November 22, 2007, reuniting him with former USC running back LenDale White and his former offensive coordinator from USC, Norm Chow.

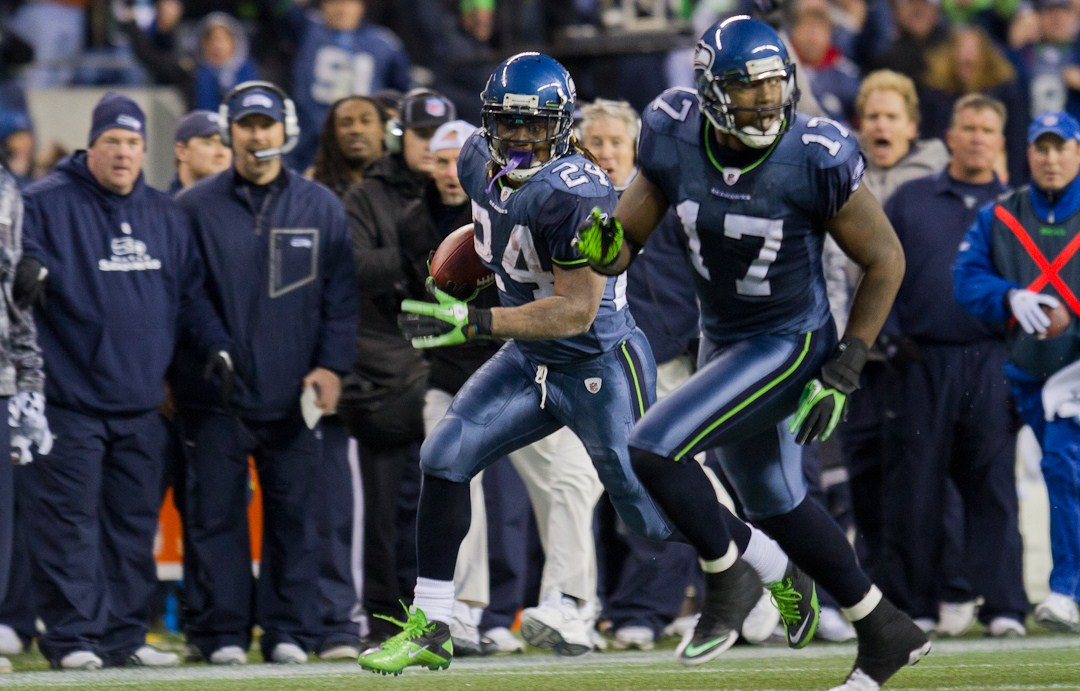
Williams (17) and Marshawn Lynch during the Seahawks January 2011 Wild Card win over the New Orleans Saints.

=== Seattle Seahawks ===
After spending two years out of football, Williams signed with the Seattle Seahawks on April 15, 2010, reuniting Williams with former USC head coach Pete Carroll. After the Seahawks released T. J. Houshmandzadeh, Williams joined the starting unit, and during his debut for Seattle, Williams recorded four catches for 64 yards. In Week 6, he had career highs in both catches and yards going 10 catches for 123 yards in a 23–20 win against Chicago. He topped this performance four weeks later against the Cardinals, catching 11 passes for 145 yards. On Monday, January 3, the Seahawks rewarded Williams for his comeback season with a three-year contract extension. Williams responded by catching a touchdown pass in the Seahawks' wildcard victory over the New Orleans Saints, and two touchdowns in the following round's loss to Chicago. As of 2018, Williams, Steve Largent, Jerramy Stevens and Jermaine Kearse as the only four Seahawks with two receiving touchdowns in a single post-season game; he is also the only receiver in franchise history with three receiving touchdowns in the same postseason.

Williams followed this up with a disappointing 2011 season in which he broke his leg and ankle and had only 18 catches.

He was released by the Seattle Seahawks on July 13, 2012.

=== Toronto Argonauts ===
On May 23, 2013, Williams signed with the Toronto Argonauts of the Canadian Football League. He was released by the team on May 31.

== Career statistics ==
=== NFL ===
Year	Team	G	Rec	Yards	Y/R	TD	LNG
2005	Detroit Lions	14	29	350	12.1	1	49
2006	Detroit Lions	8	8	99	12.3	1	21
2007	Oakland Raiders	6	7	90	12.9	0	24
2007	Tennessee Titans	2	0	0	0.0	0	0
2010	Seattle Seahawks	14	65	751	11.6	2	68
2011	Seattle Seahawks	12	18	236	13.1	1	55
Total		56	127	1,526	12.0	5	68

=== College ===
Year	Team	G	Rec	Yards	Y/R	TD	LNG
2002	USC Trojans	13	81	1,265	15.6	14	55
2003	USC Trojans	13	95	1,314	13.8	16	40

== Career highlights ==
College

- Second-team All-Pac-10 (2002)
- Pac-10 Freshman of the Year (2002)
- First-team Sporting News Freshman All-American (2002)
- Honorable mention All-American (2002)
- First-team All-Pac-10 (2003)
- Consensus first-team All-American (2003)
- Biletnikoff Award finalist (2003)
- Heisman Trophy finalist (2003)
- CBS Sportsline.com National Player of the Year (2003)
- Sporting News National Player of the Year (2003)
- Playboy PreSeason All American (2003)
- CBS Sportsline National Player of the Year (2003)
- Set USC and Pac10 Freshman Records for yards (1,265), TDs (14), Recs (81) 2002
- Set Freshman National Records Yards, Recs, TDs(tied) 2002

== Coaching career ==
After retiring in 2011, Williams coached defensive backs in his first season of high school in Los Angeles. Williams was both the football and basketball head coach at Brentwood School. In 2014, Williams accepted a position as head coach at Locke High School in Los Angeles. In March 2016, he became the head coach at Van Nuys High School, where he had a record of 6-35 in four seasons from 2016 through 2019. In 2020, Williams accepted the head coaching job at Wharton High School in Tampa, Florida. Accepting the position following the resignation of coach David Mitchell, who stepped away after 14 seasons to deal with family medical issues, Williams embraced the challenge of coaching in Florida's highest class, 8A. After three seasons and a 24–8 record (with only three road losses), and three playoff appearances, Williams took over at T.R. Robinson HS in South Tampa. In his first and only season, Williams led the Knights to a 9-3 record and the 2M District 6 Championship, his first after three runner up finishes. In April 2024, Williams returned to USC, joining the football program under head coach Lincoln Riley as Assistant Director of Player Development.
