= Ben Obomanu =

American football player (born 1983)

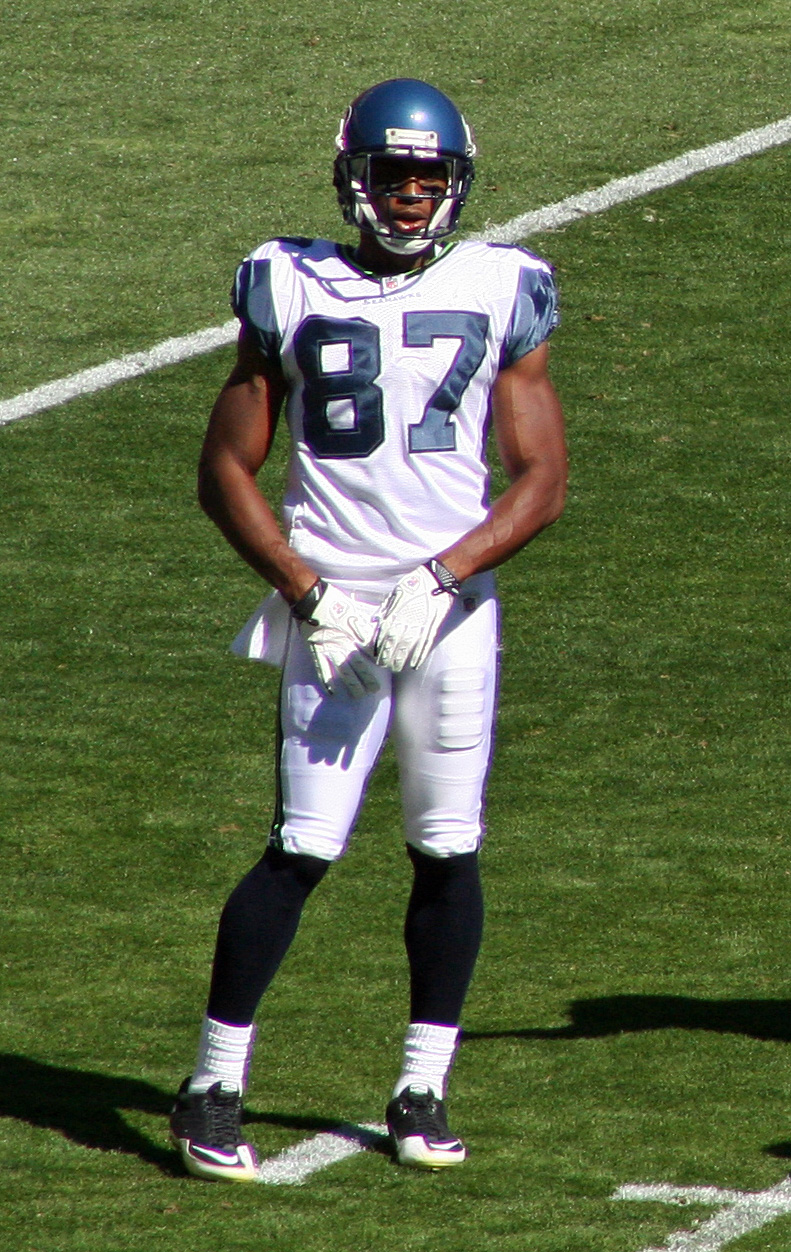
- Obomanu with the Seattle Seahawks in 2010

No. 15, 87
- Position: Wide receiver

Personal information
- Born: October 30, 1983 (age 43); Selma, Alabama, U.S.
- Listed height: 6 ft 1 in (1.85 m)
- Listed weight: 204 lb (93 kg)

Career information
- High school: Selma
- College: Auburn (2002–2005)
- NFL draft: 2006: 7th round, 249th overall pick

Career history
- Seattle Seahawks (2006–2012); New York Jets (2013)

Career NFL statistics
- Receptions: 88
- Receiving yards: 1,217
- Receiving touchdowns: 7
- Stats at Pro Football Reference

Benjamin Ebenezer Obomanu (born October 30, 1983) is an American former professional football player who was a wide receiver in the National Football League (NFL). Obomanu played college football for the Auburn Tigers, and he was selected by the Seattle Seahawks in the seventh round of the 2006 NFL draft.

== Early life ==
Obomanu attended Selma High School in Selma, Alabama, and was a letterman and a starter in football and basketball. He graduated from Selma High School as a valedictorian.

== College career ==
Obomanu played football for Auburn from 2002 to 2005. He had a career game against Ole MIss in 2003 but dropped the game winning touchdown pass in the end zone in a loss.

Obomanu is a member of the Sigma Delta chapter (Auburn University) of Omega Psi Phi fraternity. He attended the University of Alabama School of Law beginning in Fall 2015.

== Professional career ==
Pre-draft measurables
Height	Weight	Arm length	Hand span	40-yard dash	10-yard split	20-yard split	20-yard shuttle	Three-cone drill	Vertical jump	Broad jump
6 ft 1 in (1.85 m)	205 lb (93 kg)	33 1/2 in (0.85 m)	8 5/8 in (0.22 m)	4.44 s	1.57 s	2.62 s	4.21 s	6.98 s	41.0 in (1.04 m)	10 ft 1 in (3.07 m)
All values from NFL Combine/Pro Day

=== Seattle Seahawks ===
After being drafted by the Seattle Seahawks in the seventh round (249th overall) of the 2006 NFL draft, Obomanu spent the entire 2006 season on the team's practice squad.

Obomanu made the Seahawks' active roster out of training camp in 2007. His first NFL touchdown came in on October 14 in a Sunday Night Football game against the New Orleans Saints. Obomanu caught a 17-yard Matt Hasselbeck pass late in the second quarter.

Obomanu broke his collarbone in a preseason game against the Oakland Raiders on the 29th of August 2008 and he was placed on Injured Reserve the following day.

Following Week 11 of the 2010 NFL Season, Obomanu was promoted to the #2 receiver, starting alongside Mike Williams.

In a home game against the Carolina Panthers in 2010, Obomanu was injured as a result of a hit by Panthers safety Charles Godfrey.

Obomanu finished the 2010 season with 30 receptions for 494 yards, 4 touchdowns, and a 16.5 yard per catch average. Shortly after the Seahawks' were eliminated from the playoffs against the Bears, Obomanu signed a new 3-year contract with the Seahawks running through 2013.

On March 15, 2013, the Seahawks released Obomanu.

=== New York Jets ===
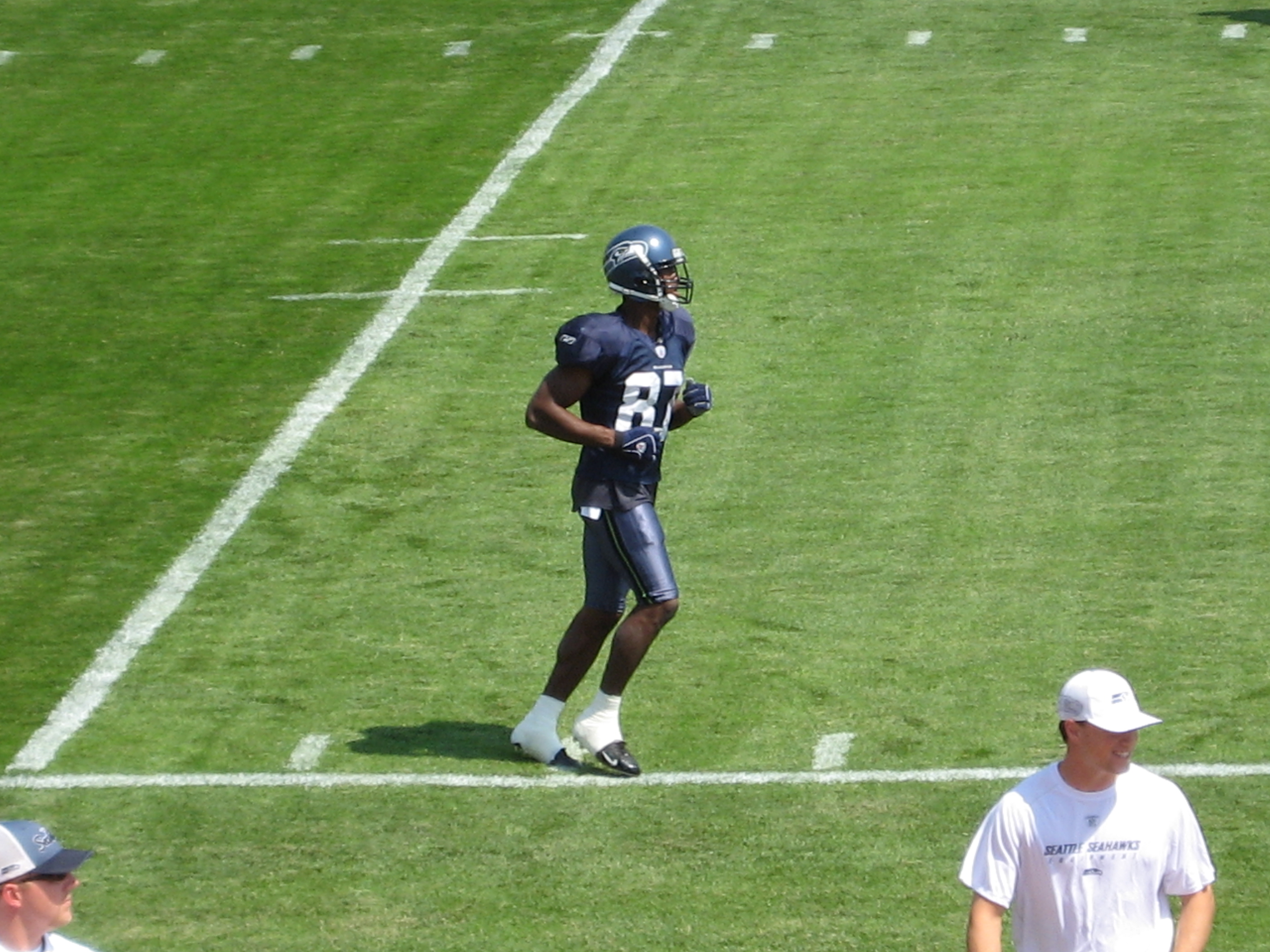
Obomanu in 2006

Obomanu was signed by the New York Jets on May 30, 2013. He was released on August 31, 2013. He was re-signed on September 10, 2013. He was released on October 2, 2013.

== Career statistics ==
=== NFL ===
Season	Team	Games		Receiving					Rushing					Fumbles	
Season	Team	GP	GS	Rec	Yds	Avg	Lng	TD	Att	Yds	Avg	Lng	TD	FUM	Lost
2006	Seattle Seahawks	-	-	-	-	-	-	-	-	-	-	-	-	-	-
2007	Seattle Seahawks	13	0	12	180	15.0	30	1	-	-	-	-	-	-	-
2008	Seattle Seahawks	Did not play due to injury													
2009	Seattle Seahawks	14	0	4	41	10.3	12	0	-	-	-	-	-	1	1
2010	Seattle Seahawks	15	6	30	494	16.5	87	4	2	17	8.5	13	0	-	-
2011	Seattle Seahawks	16	6	37	436	11.8	55	2	1	13	13.0	13	0	-	-
2012	Seattle Seahawks	8	0	4	58	14.5	36	0	1	11	11.0	11	0	-	-
2013	New York Jets	3	0	1	8	8	8	0	-	-	-	-	-	-	-
	Total	69	13	88	1,217	13.8	87	7	4	41	10.3	13	0	1	1

=== College ===
	Receiving					
Year	Team	Rec	Yards	Y/R	TD	Long
2002	Auburn Tigers	17	224	13.2	3	45
2003	Auburn Tigers	22	373	17.0	3	68
2004	Auburn Tigers	25	359	14.4	7	43
2005	Auburn Tigers	33	357	10.8	5	21
Total		97	1313	13.5	18	68

== Law school ==
In the fall of 2015, Obomanu enrolled in law school at The University of Alabama School of Law. During his third year, Obomanu served as the president of the Black Law Students Association and as the student ombudsperson for the Honor Council.
