= Marcus Brown (cornerback, born 1987) =

American football player (born 1987)

No. 32
- Position: Cornerback

Personal information
- Born: January 27, 1987 (age 39); Marianna, Arkansas, U.S.
- Listed height: 6 ft 2 in (1.88 m)
- Listed weight: 190 lb (86 kg)

Career information
- High school: Lee (Marianna)
- College: Arkansas State
- NFL draft: 2010: undrafted

Career history
- Seattle Seahawks (2010); Miami Dolphins (2011–2012)*; Utah Blaze (2013)*; Cleveland Gladiators (2013)
- * Offseason or practice squad member only
- Stats at Pro Football Reference

Marcus Brown (born January 27, 1987) is an American former professional football player who was a cornerback in the National Football League (NFL). He was signed by the Seattle Seahawks as an undrafted free agent in 2010. He played college football for the Arkansas State Red Wolves.

Brown was also a member of the Miami Dolphins.

== College career ==
Brown redshirted as a true freshman and participated on the scout team.

As a freshman redshirt, Brown played in eight games and starting in one. He ended the season with 16 tackles with a forced fumble. He also returned a punt for 12 yards.

He sat out his entire sophomore season in 2007.

He played in all 12 games as a junior in 2008. He tallied 57 tackles with 5 of them being for a loss of yards. He also forced 2 fumbles and returned one for a 71-yard touchdown. He had one interception.

As a senior in 2009, Brown recorded 47 tackles and one forced fumble.

== Professional career ==
After going undrafted in the 2010 NFL draft, Brown signed with the Seattle Seahawks as an undrafted free agent on April 24, 2010. He was cut on September 4. He was re-signed to the practice squad two days later. On December 20, Brown was promoted to the active roster and played in his first career game on January 2, 2011, against the St. Louis Rams. He was waived on August 18.

The Miami Dolphins signed Brown to their practice squad on December 7, 2011. He was re-signed to a future contract on January 30, 2012. The Dolphins released him during the preseason on August 25.

Brown signed with the Utah Blaze of the Arena Football League on January 10, 2013. Brown was placed on Recallable reassignment in April. Two days after his reassignment, he was claimed by the Cleveland Gladiators.

A day after being assigned to the Cleveland Gladiators, Brown was added to the refused to report list.
