= Peter McLoughlin =

American businessman

- McLoughlin in 2010
- Occupations: CEO Vulcan Sports & Entertainment

Peter McLoughlin is an American businessman. He formerly served as team president for the Seattle Seahawks of the National Football League (NFL) from 2010 until 2018, and is also the CEO of Vulcan Sports & Entertainment.

== Early career ==
McLoughlin began his career with six years at NBC Sports before eventually moving on to Anheuser-Busch where he worked for 21 years in a variety of roles. From 1998-2006 he was the VP/Corporate Media.

== Seattle Seahawks ==
McLoughlin was named team president of the Seattle Seahawks and First & Goal, Inc. on September 23, 2010.

In 2016, McLoughlin’s seventh season with Seattle, the Seahawks reached the playoffs for the fifth-consecutive year while finishing the season with 122-consecutive sellouts. The Seahawks won their first NFL title in Super Bowl XLVIII, defeating the Denver Broncos, 43–8. In 2014, Seattle reached the Super Bowl for the second-consecutive season as the Seahawks faced the New England Patriots in Super Bowl XLIX. In September 2018, left the position on amicable terms, being succeeded by Chuck Arnold.

== Personal ==
McLoughlin graduated from Deerfield Academy and later moved on to Harvard University with a degree in English literature. He is married to wife, Kelly, and the couple has five children.
