= 2012 Seattle Seahawks season =

American football team season

- Owner: Paul Allen
- General manager: John Schneider
- Head coach: Pete Carroll
- Offensive coordinator: Darrell Bevell
- Defensive coordinator: Gus Bradley
- Home stadium: CenturyLink Field

Results
- Record: 11–5
- Division place: 2nd NFC West
- Playoffs: Won Wild Card Playoffs (at Redskins) 24–14; Lost Divisional Playoffs (at Falcons) 28–30
- All-Pros: 4: RB Marshawn Lynch (1st team); C Max Unger (1st team); CB Richard Sherman (1st team); S Earl Thomas (1st team)
- Pro Bowlers: 6: QB Russell Wilson; RB Marshawn Lynch; T Russell Okung; C Max Unger; FS Earl Thomas; RS Leon Washington

Uniform
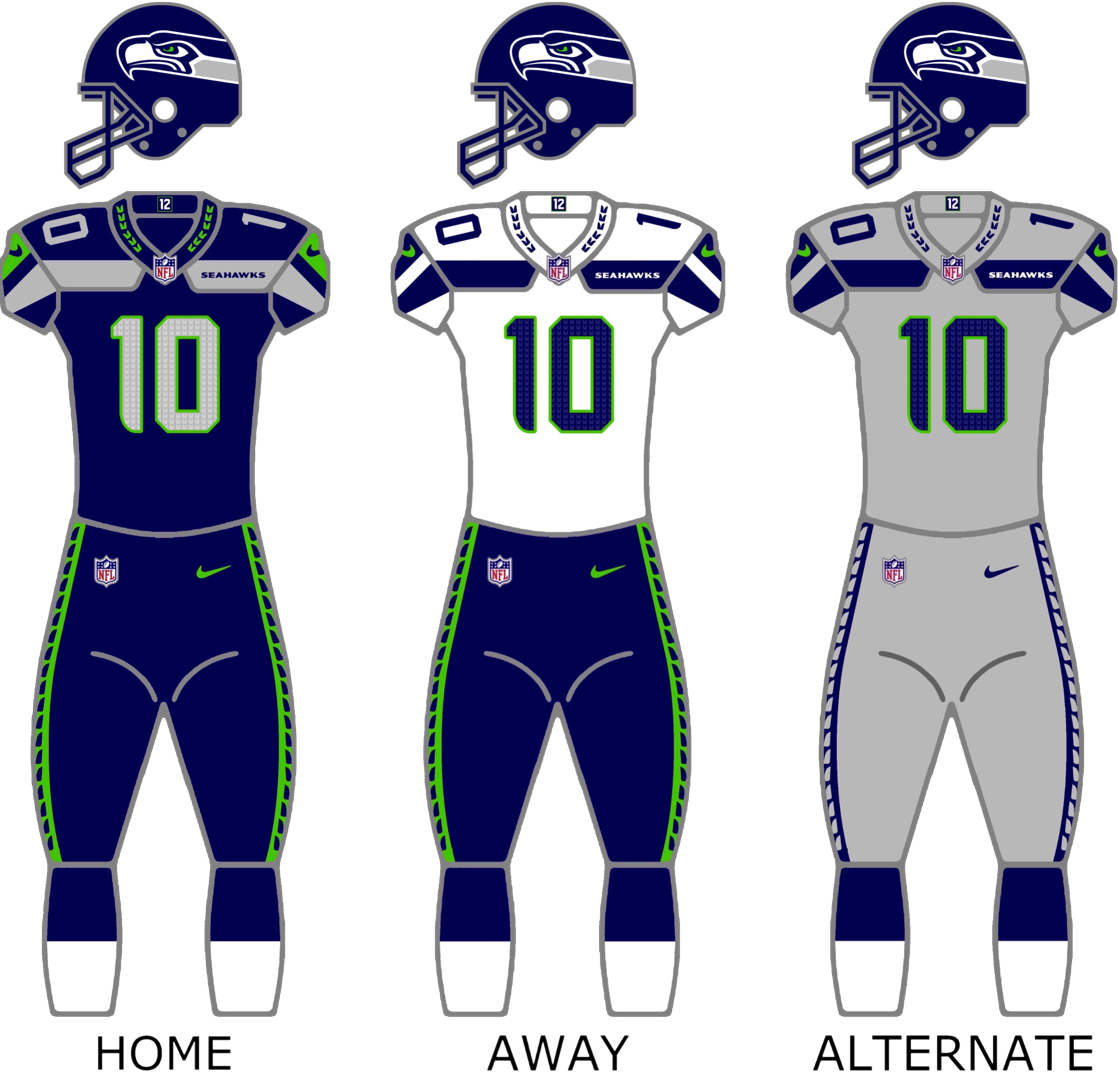

The 2012 season was the Seattle Seahawks' 37th in the National Football League (NFL) and their third under head coach Pete Carroll. The Seahawks had a three-way quarterback competition with Tarvaris Jackson, Matt Flynn and rookie Russell Wilson. Jackson was traded to the Bills, and Wilson won the job.

The Seahawks finished 11–5, an improvement from a 7–9 record in 2011, and it marked the Seahawks' first winning season since 2007. The team was 4–0 during the preseason. Their 11 victories was the third best in franchise history. The Seahawks went undefeated at home for the third time in franchise history, after 2003 and 2005. Additionally, with their victory over the Washington Redskins at FedExField in the wild-card round, the Seahawks won their first road playoff game since 1983. However, despite holding a lead with just 30 seconds left in regulation, the Seahawks lost to the Atlanta Falcons in the Divisional round by a score of 30–28.

== New logo and uniform ==
On April 3, 2012, Nike unveiled the new design for the uniforms and logo for the Seahawks. The new designs incorporate a new accent color, "Wolf Grey", and the main colors are "College Navy" and "Action Green". The uniforms incorporate "feather trims", twelve feathers printed on the neckline and down each pant leg to represent the "12th Man", referring to the team's fans.

== 2012 draft class ==
| Round | Selection | Player | Position | College |
|---|---|---|---|---|
| 1 | 15^{[a]} | Bruce Irvin | DE | West Virginia |
| 2 | 47^{[b]} | Bobby Wagner | LB | Utah State |
| 3 | 75 | Russell Wilson | QB | Wisconsin |
| 4 | 106 | Robert Turbin | RB | Utah State |
| 4 | 114^{[a]} | Jaye Howard | DT | Florida |
| 5^{[c]} | 154^{[b]} | Korey Toomer | LB | Idaho |
| 6 | 172^{[a]} | Jeremy Lane | CB | Northwestern State |
| 6 | 181 | Winston Guy | S | Kentucky |
| 7 | 225^{[d]}^{[e]} | J. R. Sweezy | G | N.C. State |
| 7 | 232^{[b]} | Greg Scruggs | DE | Louisville |

Notes

^{^[a]} The team traded its original first-round selection (#12 overall) to the Philadelphia Eagles in exchange for the Eagles' first- (#15 overall), fourth- (#114 overall) and sixth- (#172 overall) selections.
^{^[b]} The team traded its original second-round selection (#43 overall) to the New York Jets in exchange for the Jets' second- (#47 overall), fifth- (#154 overall) and seventh- (#232 overall) round selections.
^{^[c]} The team traded its original fifth-round selection (#147 overall) and a 2011 fourth-round selection to the Buffalo Bills in exchange for running back Marshawn Lynch.
^{^[d]} The team traded its original seventh-round selection (#219 overall) to the Detroit Lions in exchange for offensive tackle Tyler Polumbus.
^{^[e]} The team acquired this seventh-round selection (#225 overall) as part of a trade that sent linebacker Aaron Curry to the Oakland Raiders.

== Personnel ==
=== Staff / Coaches ===
2012 Seattle Seahawks staff
| **Front office**: Chairman – Paul Allen; President – Peter McLoughlin; Executive vice president/general manager – John Schneider; Vice president of football administration – John Idzik; Senior personnel executive – Scot McCloughan; Director of pro personnel – Tag Ribary; Director of college scouting – Scott Fitterer; Assistant director of pro personnel – Trent Kirchner; **Head coaches**: Executive vice president of football operations/head coach – Pete Carroll; Assistant head coach/offensive line – Tom Cable; **Offensive coaches**: Offensive coordinator – Darrell Bevell; Quarterbacks – Carl Smith; Running backs – Sherman Smith; Wide receivers – Kippy Brown; Tight ends – Pat McPherson; Assistant offensive line – Pat Ruel; Offensive quality control – Dave Canales; Offensive quality control – Keith Carter | **Defensive coaches**: Defensive coordinator – Gus Bradley; Pass game coordinator – Rocky Seto; Defensive line – Todd Wash; Linebackers – Ken Norton Jr.; Defensive backs – Kris Richard; Defensive assistant – Nate Carroll; Defensive quality control – Robert Saleh; **Special teams coaches**: Special teams coordinator – Brian Schneider; Assistant special teams – Marquand Manuel; **Strength and conditioning**: Head strength and conditioning – Chris Carlisle; Assistant strength and conditioning – Mondray Gee; Assistant strength and conditioning – Jamie Yancher |

=== Final roster ===
2012 Seattle Seahawks roster
| **Quarterbacks (QB)**: 15 Matt Flynn; **3** Russell Wilson; **Running backs (RB)**: **24** Marshawn Lynch; **26** Michael Robinson FB; 22 Robert Turbin; 33 Leon Washington RS; **Wide receivers (WR)**: 89 Doug Baldwin; 10 Deon Butler; 11 Jermaine Kearse; **18** Sidney Rice; **81** Golden Tate; **Tight ends (TE)**: 85 Anthony McCoy; 84 Sean McGrath; **86** Zach Miller | **Offensive linemen (OL)**: **68** Breno Giacomini T; 61 Lemuel Jeanpierre C; 63 Rishaw Johnson G; **67** Paul McQuistan G; 74 John Moffitt G; **76** Russell Okung T; 65 Frank Omiyale T; 75 Mike Person G; 64 J. R. Sweezy G; **60** Max Unger C; **Defensive linemen (DL)**: **99** Alan Branch DT; **79** Red Bryant DE; **91** Chris Clemons DE; 94 Jaye Howard DT; 69 Clinton McDonald DT; **92** Brandon Mebane DT; 98 Greg Scruggs DE | **Linebackers (LB)**: 52 Allen Bradford OLB; 55 Heath Farwell MLB; **56** Leroy Hill OLB; 51 Bruce Irvin OLB; 57 Mike Morgan OLB; 53 Malcolm Smith OLB; **54** Bobby Wagner MLB; **50** K. J. Wright OLB; **Defensive backs (DB)**: **31** Kam Chancellor SS; 27 Winston Guy SS; 32 Jeron Johnson SS; 20 Jeremy Lane CB; 42 Chris Maragos FS; 41 Byron Maxwell CB; 35 DeShawn Shead CB; **25** Richard Sherman CB; **29** Earl Thomas FS; 28 Walter Thurmond CB; 23 Marcus Trufant CB; **Special teams (ST)**: 49 Clint Gresham LS; 4 Stephen Hauschka K; 9 Jon Ryan P | **Practice squad**: 13 Phil Bates WR; 40 Derrick Coleman RB; 30 Chandler Fenner CB; 48 Cooper Helfet TE; 43 Kyle Knox LB; 16 Corbin Louks WR; 59 Korey Toomer LB (IR); 19 Bryan Walters WR; **Reserve**: **39** Brandon Browner CB (Susp.); **77** James Carpenter G (NF-Ill.); 58 Dexter Davis DE (IR); 90 Jason Jones DT (IR); 14 Charly Martin WR (IR); 88 Cameron Morrah TE (IR); 87 Ben Obomanu WR (IR); Rookies in italics 53 active, 8 reserve, 7 practice squad |

- Starters in bold.
- (*) Denotes players that were selected for the 2013 Pro Bowl.

== Schedule ==
=== Preseason ===
| Week | Date | Opponent | Result | Record | Venue | Attendance | Recap |
|---|---|---|---|---|---|---|---|
| 1 | August 11 | Tennessee Titans | **W** 27–17 | 1–0 | CenturyLink Field | 65,589 | Recap |
| 2 | August 18 | at Denver Broncos | **W** 30–10 | 2–0 | Sports Authority Field at Mile High | 74,012 | Recap |
| 3 | August 24 | at Kansas City Chiefs | **W** 44–14 | 3–0 | Arrowhead Stadium | 63,870 | Recap |
| 4 | August 30 | Oakland Raiders | **W** 21–3 | 4–0 | CenturyLink Field | 66,157 | Recap |

=== Regular season ===
Divisional matchups: the NFC West played the NFC North and the AFC East.

| Week | Date | Opponent | Result | Record | Venue | Attendance | Recap |
|---|---|---|---|---|---|---|---|
| 1 | September 9 | at **Arizona Cardinals** | **L** 16–20 | 0–1 | University of Phoenix Stadium | 60,032 | Recap |
| 2 | September 16 | Dallas Cowboys | **W** 27–7 | 1–1 | CenturyLink Field | 68,008 | Recap |
| 3 | September 24 | Green Bay Packers | **W** 14–12 | 2–1 | CenturyLink Field | 68,218 | Recap |
| 4 | September 30 | at **St. Louis Rams** | **L** 13–19 | 2–2 | Edward Jones Dome | 53,193 | Recap |
| 5 | October 7 | at Carolina Panthers | **W** 16–12 | 3–2 | Bank of America Stadium | 72,676 | Recap |
| 6 | October 14 | New England Patriots | **W** 24–23 | 4–2 | CenturyLink Field | 68,137 | Recap |
| 7 | October 18 | at **San Francisco 49ers** | **L** 6–13 | 4–3 | Candlestick Park | 69,732 | Recap |
| 8 | October 28 | at Detroit Lions | **L** 24–28 | 4–4 | Ford Field | 63,497 | Recap |
| 9 | November 4 | Minnesota Vikings | **W** 30–20 | 5–4 | CenturyLink Field | 67,584 | Recap |
| 10 | November 11 | New York Jets | **W** 28–7 | 6–4 | CenturyLink Field | 67,841 | Recap |
| 11 | Bye | | | | | | |
| 12 | November 25 | at Miami Dolphins | **L** 21–24 | 6–5 | Sun Life Stadium | 51,295 | Recap |
| 13 | December 2 | at Chicago Bears | **W** 23–17 (OT) | 7–5 | Soldier Field | 62,264 | Recap |
| 14 | December 9 | **Arizona Cardinals** | **W** 58–0 | 8–5 | CenturyLink Field | 67,685 | Recap |
| 15 | December 16 | at Buffalo Bills | **W** 50–17 | 9–5 | (Canada) Rogers Centre (Toronto) | 40,770 | Recap |
| 16 | December 23 | **San Francisco 49ers** | **W** 42–13 | 10–5 | CenturyLink Field | 68,161 | Recap |
| 17 | December 30 | **St. Louis Rams** | **W** 20–13 | 11–5 | CenturyLink Field | 67,936 | Recap |

Bold indicates division opponents.
Source: 2012 NFL season results

# Indicates that the Seahawks were the visiting team in the Bills Toronto Series.

=== Postseason ===
| Round | Date | Opponent (seed) | Result | Record | Venue | Attendance | Recap |
|---|---|---|---|---|---|---|---|
| Wild Card | January 6, 2013 | at Washington Redskins (4) | **W** 24–14 | 1–0 | FedExField | 84,325 | Recap |
| Divisional | January 13, 2013 | at Atlanta Falcons (1) | **L** 28–30 | 1–1 | Georgia Dome | 70,366 | Recap |

== Standings ==
NFC West
| | W | L | T | PCT | DIV | CONF | PF | PA | STK |
|---|---|---|---|---|---|---|---|---|---|
| ^{(2)} San Francisco 49ers | 11 | 4 | 1 | .719 | 3–2–1 | 7–4–1 | 397 | 273 | W1 |
| ^{(5)} Seattle Seahawks | 11 | 5 | 0 | .688 | 3–3 | 8–4 | 412 | 245 | W5 |
| St. Louis Rams | 7 | 8 | 1 | .469 | 4–1–1 | 6–5–1 | 299 | 348 | L1 |
| Arizona Cardinals | 5 | 11 | 0 | .313 | 1–5 | 3–9 | 250 | 357 | L2 |

== Game summaries ==
=== Preseason ===
==== Week P1: vs. Tennessee Titans ====
Preseason Week One: Seattle Seahawks vs. Tennessee Titans – Game summary

| Quarter | 1 | 2 | 3 | 4 | Total |
|---|---|---|---|---|---|
| Titans | 0 | 3 | 14 | 0 | 17 |
| Seahawks | 10 | 0 | 7 | 10 | 27 |

at CenturyLink Field, Seattle, Washington

- Date: August 11
- Game time: 7:06 p.m. local
- Game weather: clear, 79 °F (26 °C), 39% humidity, wind WNW 10 miles per hour (16 km/h)
- Game attendance: 65,589
- Referee: Bruce Hermansen
- TV: NFLN, KCPQ
- Gamecenter, Gamebook

==== Week P2: at Denver Broncos ====
Preseason Week Two: Seattle Seahawks at Denver Broncos – Game summary

| Quarter | 1 | 2 | 3 | 4 | Total |
|---|---|---|---|---|---|
| Seahawks | 3 | 6 | 7 | 14 | 30 |
| Broncos | 7 | 3 | 0 | 0 | 10 |

at Sports Authority Field at Mile High, Denver, Colorado

- Date: August 18
- Game time: 7:05 p.m. local
- Game weather: cloudy, 79 °F (26 °C), 21% humidity, wind N 5 miles per hour (8.0 km/h)
- Game attendance: 74,012
- Referee: Gerald Wright
- TV: KCPQ
- Gamecenter, Gamebook

==== Week P3: at Kansas City Chiefs ====
Preseason Week Three: Seattle Seahawks at Kansas City Chiefs – Game summary

| Quarter | 1 | 2 | 3 | 4 | Total |
|---|---|---|---|---|---|
| Seahawks | 6 | 17 | 21 | 0 | 44 |
| Chiefs | 0 | 7 | 0 | 7 | 14 |

at Arrowhead Stadium, Kansas City, Missouri

- Date: August 24
- Game time: 7:07 p.m. local
- Game weather: cloudy, 85 °F (29 °C), 50% humidity, wind S 7 miles per hour (11 km/h)
- Game attendance: 63,870
- Referee: Craig Ochoa
- TV: KCPQ
- Gamecenter, Gamebook

==== Week P4: vs. Oakland Raiders ====
Preseason Week Four: Seattle Seahawks vs. Oakland Raiders – Game summary

| Quarter | 1 | 2 | 3 | 4 | Total |
|---|---|---|---|---|---|
| Raiders | 0 | 0 | 0 | 3 | 3 |
| Seahawks | 3 | 10 | 6 | 2 | 21 |

at CenturyLink Field, Seattle, Washington

- Date: August 30
- Game time: 7:06 p.m. local
- Game weather: clear, 71 °F (22 °C), 45% humidity, wind NW 8 miles per hour (13 km/h)
- Game attendance: 66,157
- Referee: Jerry Frump
- TV: KCPQ
- Gamecenter, Gamebook

=== Regular season ===
==== Week 1: at Arizona Cardinals ====
Week One: Seattle Seahawks at Arizona Cardinals – Game summary

| Quarter | 1 | 2 | 3 | 4 | Total |
|---|---|---|---|---|---|
| Seahawks | 3 | 0 | 10 | 3 | 16 |
| Cardinals | 3 | 7 | 3 | 7 | 20 |

at University of Phoenix Stadium, Glendale, Arizona

- Date: September 9
- Game time: 1:25 p.m. local
- Game weather: indoors
- Game attendance: 60,032
- Referee: Bruce Hermansen
- TV announcers (Fox): Sam Rosen, Heath Evans & Heidi Androl
- Gamecenter, Gamebook

Game information

First quarter

- SEA – Steven Hauschka 27-yard field goal, 7:26 (SEA 3–0)
- ARI – Jay Feely 21-yard field goal, 0:34 (Tied 3–3)

Second quarter

- ARI – LaRod Stephens-Howling 1-yard run (Jay Feely kick), 5:58 (ARI 10–3)

Third quarter

- ARI – Jay Feely 31-yard field goal, 9:59 (ARI 13–3)
- SEA – Sidney Rice 10-yard pass from Russell Wilson (Steven Hauschka kick), 7:51 (ARI 13–10)
- SEA – Steven Hauschka 47-yard field goal, 5:13 (Tied 13–13)

Fourth quarter

- SEA – Steven Hauschka 39-yard field goal, 9:20 (SEA (16–13)
- ARI – Andre Roberts 6 yards pass from Kevin Kolb (Jay Feely kick), 4:59 (ARI 20–16)

Top passers

- SEA – Russell Wilson: 18/34, 153 yds, 1 TD, 1 INT
- ARI – John Skelton: 14/28, 149 yds, 1 INT

Top rushers

- SEA – Marshawn Lynch: 21 car, 85 yds
- ARI – Andre Roberts: 1 car, 15 yds

Top receivers

- SEA – Braylon Edwards: 5 rec, 43 yds
- ARI – Larry Fitzgerald: 4 rec, 63 yds

Top tacklers

- SEA – K. J. Wright: 5 solo, 4 asst, ff
- ARI – Daryl Washington: 10 solo, sack, tfl

Team – pass – rush – total – to

- SEA – 139 – 115 – 254 – 2
- ARI – 210 – 43 – 253 – 2

With the loss, the Seahawks started their season 0–1. This would be the last time the seahawks lost a regular season game in Arizona until 2020.

==== Week 2: vs. Dallas Cowboys ====
Week Two: Dallas Cowboys at Seattle Seahawks – Game summary

| Quarter | 1 | 2 | 3 | 4 | Total |
|---|---|---|---|---|---|
| Cowboys | 0 | 7 | 0 | 0 | 7 |
| Seahawks | 10 | 3 | 7 | 7 | 27 |

at CenturyLink Field, Seattle, Washington

- Date: September 16
- Game time: 1:06 p.m. local
- Game weather: clear, 68 °F (20 °C), 56% humidity, wind NNW 4 miles per hour (6.4 km/h)
- Game attendance: 68,008
- Referee: Donovan Briggans
- TV announcers (Fox): Kenny Albert, Daryl Johnston & Tony Siragusa
- Gamecenter, Gamebook

Game information

First quarter

- SEA – Steven Hauschka 21-yard field goal, 11:43 (SEA 3–0)
- SEA – Jeron Johnson 3-yard blocked punt return (Steven Hauschka kick), 10:23 (SEA 10–0)

Second quarter

- DAL – Miles Austin 22-yard pass from Tony Romo (Dan Bailey kick), 12:09 (SEA 10–7)
- SEA – Steven Hauschka 25-yard field goal, 1:57 (SEA 13–7)

Third quarter

- SEA – Anthony McCoy 22-yard pass from Russell Wilson (Steven Hauschka kick), 5:05 (SEA 20–7)

Fourth quarter

- SEA – Marshawn Lynch 3-yard run (Steven Hauschka kick), 7:57 (SEA 27–7)

Top passers

- DAL – Tony Romo: 23/40, 251 yds, 1 TD, 1 INT
- SEA – Russell Wilson: 15/20, 151 yds, 1 TD

Top rushers

- DAL – DeMarco Murray: 12 car, 44 yds
- SEA – Marshawn Lynch: 23 car, 122 yds, 1 TD

Top receivers

- DAL – Miles Austin: 5 rec, 63 yds, 1 TD
- SEA – Anthony McCoy: 5 rec, 41 yds, 1 TD

Top tacklers

- DAL – Sean Lee: 4 solo, 10 asst
- SEA – Kam Chancellor: 7 solo, 2 asst

Team – pass – rush – total – to

- DAL – 247 – 49 – 296 – 2
- SEA – 133 – 182 – 315 – 0

After facing the Cardinals on the road, the Seahawks returned home for a home game against the Cowboys. The game went very well for the Seahawks as the team improved to 1–1. This is also the first win for rookie QB Russell Wilson.

==== Week 3: vs. Green Bay Packers ====
Week Three: Green Bay Packers at Seattle Seahawks – Game summary

| Quarter | 1 | 2 | 3 | 4 | Total |
|---|---|---|---|---|---|
| Packers | 0 | 0 | 6 | 6 | 12 |
| Seahawks | 0 | 7 | 0 | 7 | 14 |

at CenturyLink Field, Seattle, Washington

- Date: September 24
- Game time: 5:41 p.m. local
- Game weather: clear, 67 °F (19 °C), 49% humidity, wind NW 3 miles per hour (4.8 km/h)
- Game attendance: 68,218
- Referee: Wayne Elliott
- TV announcers (ESPN): Mike Tirico, Jon Gruden & Lisa Salters
- Gamecenter, Gamebook

Game information

First quarter

- No scoring plays

Second quarter

- SEA – Golden Tate 41-yard pass from Russell Wilson (Steven Hauschka kick), 6:22. Seahawks 7–0. Drive: 5 plays, 58 yards, 3:02.

Third quarter

- GB – Mason Crosby 29-yard field goal, 8:07. Seahawks 7–3. Drive: 13 plays, 55 yards, 6:53.
- GB – Mason Crosby 40-yard field goal, 1:14. Seahawks 7–6. Drive: 11 plays, 69 yards, 4:36.

Fourth quarter

- GB – Cedric Benson 1-yard run (pass failed), 8:44. Packers 12–7. Drive: 16 plays, 82 yards, 6:02.
- SEA – Golden Tate 24-yard pass from Russell Wilson (Steven Hauschka kick), 0:00. Seahawks 14–12. Drive: 6 plays, 46 yards, 0:46.

Top passers

- GB – Aaron Rodgers – 26/39, 223 yards
- SEA – Russell Wilson – 10/21, 130 yards, 2 TD

Top rushers

- GB – Cedric Benson – 17 rushes, 45 yards, TD
- SEA – Marshawn Lynch – 25 rushes, 98 yards

Top receivers

- GB – Jermichael Finley – 4 receptions, 60 yards
- SEA – Golden Tate – 3 receptions, 68 yards, 2 TD

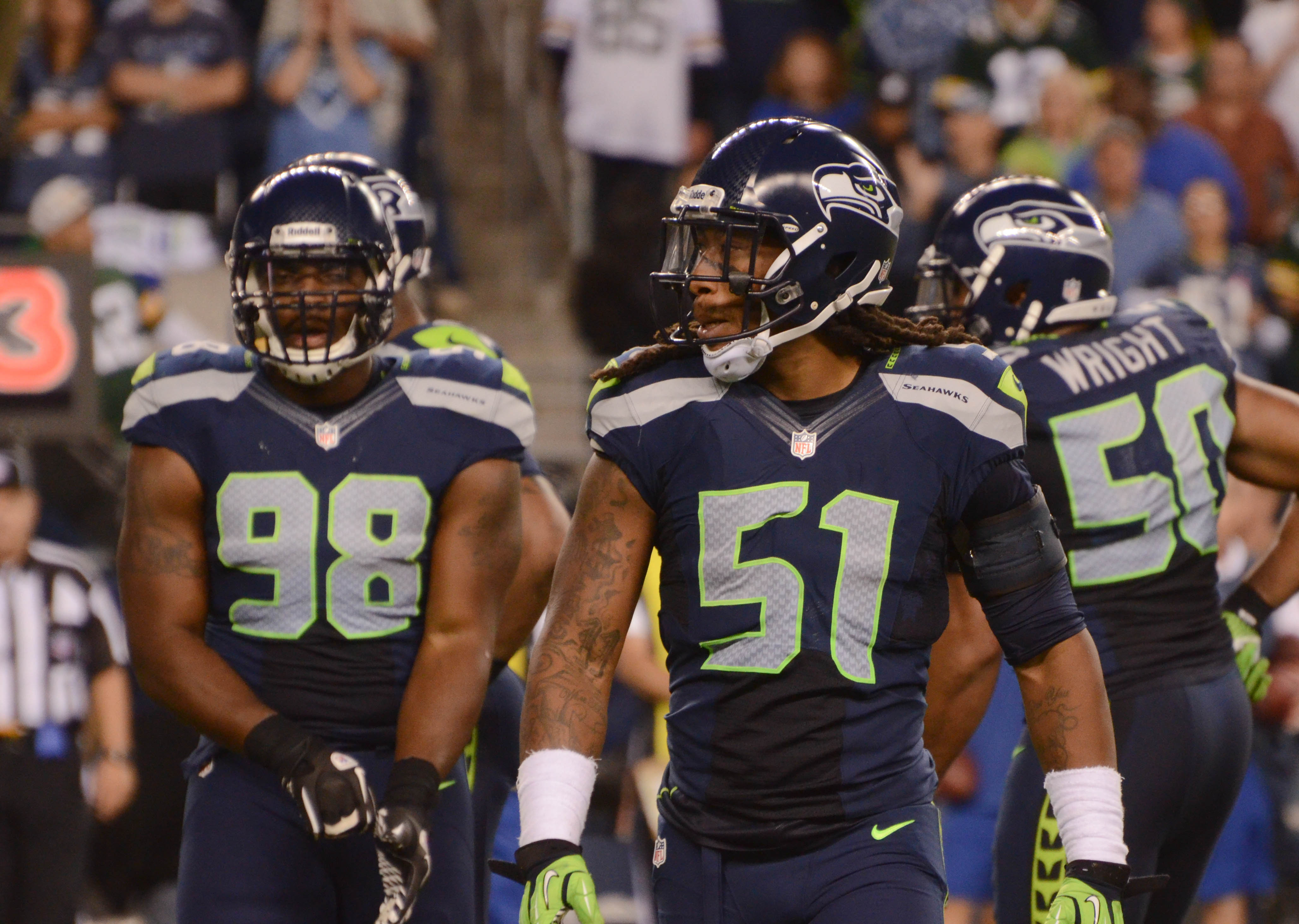
Greg Scruggs and Bruce Irvin during the Green Bay game

The game had a controversial ending when Seattle quarterback Russell Wilson threw a Hail Mary pass to the endzone on the final play that appeared to have been intercepted by Green Bay. However, while one official signaled the interception, the other official signaled a touchdown for Seattle by receiver Golden Tate, based on the rule that a catch with simultaneous possession is ruled a completion for the offense. The play was reviewed and the officials awarded the touchdown to Seattle. The call by the officials, who were replacements for the customary and more experienced officials, was met with outrage by other NFL players and fans around the country who believed Green Bay should have been awarded the interception and thus the game. Many also claimed the officials had missed an offensive pass interference call committed by Tate on Packers cornerback Sam Shields that also would have won the game for Green Bay. The NFL released an official statement the next day that, while acknowledging that pass interference should have been called on Tate, supported the decision to uphold the play as simultaneous possession.

With the win, the Seahawks improved to 2–1. With the 49ers' loss to the Vikings the previous day, Seattle and San Francisco were now tied for 2nd in the NFC West behind the 3-0 Arizona Cardinals. The Seahawks' defense accomplished a noteworthy achievement, sacking Packers quarterback Aaron Rodgers 8 times, a career-high; this was even more impressive because all eight sacks occurred in the first half of the game.

The game's final play, dubbed the "Fail Mary" or the "Inaccurate Reception", is still viewed as the catalyst for the return of the NFL's customary officials due to the ineptitude of the replacement officials.

==== Week 4: at St. Louis Rams ====
Week Four: Seattle Seahawks at St. Louis Rams – Game summary

| Quarter | 1 | 2 | 3 | 4 | Total |
|---|---|---|---|---|---|
| Seahawks | 7 | 0 | 3 | 3 | 13 |
| Rams | 3 | 10 | 3 | 3 | 19 |

at Edward Jones Dome, St. Louis, Missouri

- Date: September 30
- Game time: 12:00 p.m. local
- Game weather: indoors
- Game attendance: 53,193
- Referee: Mike Carey
- TV announcers (Fox): Ron Pitts, Mike Martz & Kristina Pink
- Gamecenter, Gamebook

Game information

First quarter

- SEA – Marshawn Lynch 17-yard run (Steven Hauschka kick) 10:45 (SEA 7–0)
- STL – Greg Zuerlein 58-yard field goal 4:59 (SEA 7–3)

Second quarter

- STL – Danny Amendola 2-yard pass from John Hekker (Greg Zuerlein kick), 1:11 (STL 10–7)
- STL – Greg Zuerlein 48-yard field goal, 0:00 (STL 13–7)

Third quarter

- STL – Greg Zuerlein 60-yard field goal, 13:46 (STL 16–7)
- SEA – Steven Hauschka 31-yard field goal, 4:10 (STL 16–10)

Fourth quarter

- SEA – Steven Hauschka 30-yard field goal, 13:03 (STL 16–13)
- STL – Greg Zuerlein 24-yard field goal, 6:07 (STL 19–13)

Top passers

- SEA – Russell Wilson: 17/25, 160 yds, 3 INT
- STL – Sam Bradford: 16/30, 221 yds, 1 INT

Top rushers

- SEA – Marshawn Lynch: 20 car, 118 yds, 1 TD
- STL – Steven Jackson: 18 car, 55 yds

Top receivers

- SEA – Sidney Rice: 4 rec, 41 yds
- STL – Danny Amendola: 6 rec, 55 yds, 1 TD

Top tacklers

- SEA – Bobby Wagner: 7 solo, 3 tfl
- STL – James Laurinaitis: 8 solo, 1 asst

Team – pass – rush – total – to

- SEA – 140 – 179 – 319 – 3
- STL – 211 – 75 – 286 – 1

With the loss, the Seahawks fell to 2–2. QB Russell Wilson also had his first career game with no passing touchdown.

==== Week 5: at Carolina Panthers ====
Week Five: Seattle Seahawks at Carolina Panthers – Game summary

| Quarter | 1 | 2 | 3 | 4 | Total |
|---|---|---|---|---|---|
| Seahawks | 3 | 3 | 7 | 3 | 16 |
| Panthers | 0 | 3 | 7 | 2 | 12 |

at Bank of America Stadium, Charlotte, North Carolina

- Date: October 7
- Game time: 4:04 p.m. local
- Game weather: cloudy, 63 °F (17 °C), 69% humidity, wind N 6 miles per hour (9.7 km/h)
- Game attendance: 72,676
- Referee: Terry McAulay
- TV announcers (Fox): Chris Myers, Tim Ryan & Kristina Pink
- Gamecenter, Gamebook

Game information

First quarter

- SEA – Steven Hauschka 22-yard field goal, 10:29 (SEA 3–0)

Second quarter

- SEA – Steven Hauschka 36-yard field goal, 8:29 (SEA 6–0)
- CAR – Justin Medlock 32-yard field goal, 0:02 (SEA 6–3)

Third quarter

- CAR – Captain Munnerlyn 33-yard interception return (Justin Medlock kick), 12:26 (CAR 10–6)
- SEA – Golden Tate 13-yard pass from Russell Wilson (Steven Hauschka kick), 0:35 (SEA 13–10)

Fourth quarter

- SEA – Steven Hauschka 44-yard field goal, 10:27 (SEA 16–10)
- CAR – Safety, Kenny Onatolu tackled Jon Ryan in end zone, 0:59 (SEA 16–12)

Top passers

- SEA – Russell Wilson: 19/25, 221 yds, 1 TD, 2 INT
- CAR – Cam Newton: 12/29, 141 yds

Top rushers

- SEA – Marshawn Lynch: 21 car, 85 yds
- CAR – Cam Newton: 7 car, 42 yds

Top receivers

- SEA – Sidney Rice: 5 rec, 67 yds
- CAR – Brandon LaFell: 3 rec, 44 yds

Top tacklers

- SEA – Brandon Browner: 4 solo, 2 asst, ff, fr
- SEA – Bobby Wagner: 3 solo, 3 asst, 1.5 sacks, tfl
- SEA – Chris Clemons: 2 solo, 4 asst, 0.5 sack, pd
- CAR – Luke Kuechly: 7 solo, 4 asst, tfl, pd, INT

Team – pass – rush – total – to

- SEA – 212 – 98 – 310 – 3
- CAR – 108 – 82 – 190 – 2

With the win, Seattle's first of three road wins during the regular season, the Seahawks improved to 3–2.

==== Week 6: vs. New England Patriots ====
Week Six: New England Patriots at Seattle Seahawks – Game summary

| Quarter | 1 | 2 | 3 | 4 | Total |
|---|---|---|---|---|---|
| Patriots | 7 | 10 | 3 | 3 | 23 |
| Seahawks | 10 | 0 | 0 | 14 | 24 |

at CenturyLink Field, Seattle, Washington

- Date: October 14
- Game time: 1:05 p.m. local
- Game weather: cloudy, 63 °F (17 °C), 80% humidity, wind SSE 9 miles per hour (14 km/h)
- Game attendance: 68,137
- Referee: Clete Blakeman
- TV announcers (CBS): Ian Eagle & Dan Fouts
- Gamecenter, Gamebook

Game information

First quarter

- SEA – Steven Hauschka 34-yard field goal, 7:35 (SEA 3–0)
- NE – Wes Welker 46-yard pass from Tom Brady (Stephen Gostkowski kick), 5:49 (NE 7–3)
- SEA – Doug Baldwin 24-yard pass from Russell Wilson (Steven Hauschka kick), 1:50 (SEA 10–7)

Second quarter

- NE – Aaron Hernandez 1-yard pass from Tom Brady (Stephen Gostkowski kick), 10:33 (NE 14–10)
- NE – Stephen Gostkowski 25-yard field goal, 2:12 (NE 17–10)

Third quarter

- NE – Stephen Gostkowski 35-yard field goal, 9:21 (NE 20–10)

Fourth quarter

- NE – Stephen Gostkowski 35-yard field goal, 9:21 (NE 23–10)
- SEA – Braylon Edwards 10-yard pass from Russell Wilson (Steven Hauschka kick), 7:21 (NE 23–17)
- SEA – Sidney Rice 46-yard pass from Russell Wilson (Steven Hauschka kick), 1:18 (SEA 24–23)

Top passers

- NE – Tom Brady: 36/58, 395 yds, 2 TD, 2 INT
- SEA – Russell Wilson: 16/27, 293 yds, 3 TD

Top rushers

- NE – Stevan Ridley: 16 car, 34 yds
- SEA – Marshawn Lynch: 15 car, 41 yds

Top receivers

- NE – Wes Welker: 10 car, 138 yds, 1 TD
- SEA – Sidney Rice: 3 car, 81 yds, 1 TD

Top tacklers

- NE – Chandler Jones: 4 solo, 5 asst, 2 sacks, tfl, ff
- SEA – Bobby Wagner: 7 solo, 7 asst, tfl

Team – pass – rush – total – to

- NE – 388 – 87 – 475 – 2
- SEA – 283 – 85 – 368 – 2

With the win, the Seahawks improved to 4–2, and with losses by the 49ers and Cardinals, the team moved into a tie for first in the NFC West. This was head coach Pete Carroll's first meeting with the Patriots since he was fired by the organization following the 1999 season. Carroll served as their head coach from 1997–99, the last one before Bill Belichick's hiring in 2000. This game is also infamous among Patriots fans as the genesis of the Richard Sherman/Tom Brady "You Mad, Bro" meme.

==== Week 7: at San Francisco 49ers ====
Week Seven: Seattle Seahawks at San Francisco 49ers – Game summary

| Quarter | 1 | 2 | 3 | 4 | Total |
|---|---|---|---|---|---|
| Seahawks | 3 | 3 | 0 | 0 | 6 |
| 49ers | 3 | 0 | 7 | 3 | 13 |

at Candlestick Park, San Francisco, California

- Date: October 18
- Game time: 5:29 p.m. local
- Game weather: clear, 80 °F (27 °C), 30% humidity, wind S 15 miles per hour (24 km/h)
- Game attendance: 69,732
- Referee: Walt Anderson
- TV announcers (NFL Network): Brad Nessler, Mike Mayock & Alex Flanagan
- Gamecenter, Gamebook

Game information

First quarter

- SEA – Steven Hauschka 52-yard field goal, 5:29 (SEA 3–0)
- SF – David Akers 38-yard field goal, 0:26 (Tied 3–3)

Second quarter

- SEA – Steven Hauschka 35-yard field goal, 12:07 (SEA 6–3)

Third quarter

- SF – Delanie Walker 12-yard pass from Alex Smith (David Akers kick), 4:29 (SF 10–6)

Fourth quarter

- SF – David Akers 28-yard field goal, 5:24 (SF 13–6)

Top passers

- SEA – Russell Wilson: 9/23, 122 yds, 1 INT
- SF – Alex Smith: 14/23, 140 yds, 1 TD, 1 INT

Top rushers

- SEA – Marshawn Lynch: 19 car, 103 yds
- SF – Frank Gore: 16 car, 131 yds

Top receivers

- SEA – Ben Obomanu: 3 rec, 50 yds
- SF – Frank Gore: 5 rec, 51 yds

Top tacklers

- SEA – K. J. Wright: 8 solo, 1 asst, tfl
- SEA – Leroy Hill: 7 solo, 2 asst
- SF – Justin Smith: 7 solo, 2 asst, tfl

Team – pass – rush – total – to

- SEA – 115 – 136 – 251 – 1
- SF – 138 – 175 – 313 – 1

With the loss, the Seahawks fell to 4–3 moving into a 2nd-place tie with the Cardinals in the NFC West.

==== Week 8: at Detroit Lions ====
Week Eight: Seattle Seahawks at Detroit Lions – Game summary

| Quarter | 1 | 2 | 3 | 4 | Total |
|---|---|---|---|---|---|
| Seahawks | 3 | 14 | 0 | 7 | 24 |
| Lions | 7 | 7 | 0 | 14 | 28 |

at Ford Field, Detroit, Michigan

- Date: October 28
- Game time: 1:03 p.m. local
- Game weather: indoors
- Game attendance: 63,497
- Referee: John Parry
- TV announcers (Fox): Chris Myers, Tim Ryan & Jaime Maggio
- Gamecenter, Gamebook

Game information

First quarter

- SEA – Steven Hauschka 23-yard field goal, 5:30 (SEA 3–0)
- DET – Ryan Broyles 6-yard pass from Matthew Stafford (Jason Hanson kick), 0:00 (DET 7–3)

Second quarter

- SEA – Marshawn Lynch 77-yard run (Steven Hauschka kick), 14:43 (SEA 10–7)
- SEA – Sidney Rice 9-yard pass from Russell Wilson (Steven Hauschka kick), 11:39 (SEA 17–7)
- DET – Titus Young 46-yard pass from Matthew Stafford (Jason Hanson kick), 8:49 (SEA 17–14)

Third quarter

- No scoring plays

Fourth quarter

- DET – Matthew Stafford 1-yard run (Jason Hanson kick), 11:35 (DET 21–17)
- SEA – Zach Miller 16-yard pass from Russell Wilson (Steven Hauschka kick), 5:27 (SEA 24–21)
- DET – Titus Young 1-yard pass from Matthew Stafford (Jason Hanson kick), 0:20 (DET 28–24)

Top passers

- SEA – Russell Wilson: 25/35, 236 yds, 2 TD, 1 INT
- DET – Matthew Stafford: 34/49, 352 yds, 3 TD, 1 INT

Top rushers

- SEA – Marshawn Lynch: 12 car, 105 yds, 1 TD
- DET – Mikel Leshoure: 10 car, 46 yds

Top receivers

- SEA – Golden Tate: 7 rec, 64 yds
- DET – Titus Young: 9 rec, 100 yds, 2 TD

Top tacklers

- SEA – Bobby Wagner: 6 solo, 6 asst, tfl
- DET – Chris Houston: 6 solo, 2 asst, tfl

Team – pass – rush – total – to

- SEA – 236 – 133 – 369 – 2
- DET – 331 – 84 – 415 – 1

With the loss, the Seahawks dropped to 4–4.

==== Week 9: vs. Minnesota Vikings ====
Week Nine: Minnesota Vikings at Seattle Seahawks – Game summary

| Quarter | 1 | 2 | 3 | 4 | Total |
|---|---|---|---|---|---|
| Vikings | 7 | 10 | 3 | 0 | 20 |
| Seahawks | 14 | 6 | 7 | 3 | 30 |

at CenturyLink Field, Seattle, Washington

- Date: November 4
- Game time: 1:05 p.m. local
- Game weather: cloudy, 60 °F (16 °C), 89% humidity, wind SSE 5 miles per hour (8.0 km/h)
- Game attendance: 67,584
- Referee: Jerome Boger
- TV announcers (Fox): Chris Myers, Tim Ryan & Jaime Maggio
- Gamecenter, Gamebook

Game information

First quarter

- MIN – Adrian Peterson 1-yard run (Blair Walsh kick), 13:15 (MIN 7–0)
- SEA – Golden Tate 6-yard pass from Russell Wilson (Steven Hauschka kick), 8:52 (Tied 7–7)
- SEA – Sidney Rice 11-yard pass from Russell Wilson (Steven Hauschka kick), 3:15 (SEA 14–7)

Second quarter

- MIN – Adrian Peterson 4-yard run (Blair Walsh kick), 11:46 (Tied 14–14)
- MIN – Blair Walsh 36-yard field goal, 5:25 (MIN 17–14)
- SEA – Golden Tate 11-yard pass from Russell Wilson (PAT failed), 0:44 (SEA 20–17)

Third quarter

- SEA – Marshawn Lynch 3-yard run (Steven Hauschka kick), 4:09 (SEA 27–17)
- MIN – Blair Walsh 55-yard field goal, 1:47 (SEA 27–20)

Fourth quarter

- SEA – Steven Hauschka 30-yard field goal, 6:23 (SEA 30–20)

Top passers

- MIN – Christian Ponder: 11/22, 63 yds, 1 INT
- SEA – Russell Wilson: 16/24, 173 yds, 3 TD

Top rushers

- MIN – Adrian Peterson: 17 car, 182 yds, 2 TD
- SEA – Marshawn Lynch: 26 car, 124 yds, 1 TD

Top receivers

- MIN – Jerome Simpson: 1 rec, 14 yds
- SEA – Sidney Rice: 4 rec, 54 yds, 1 TD

Top tacklers

- MIN – Jasper Brinkley: 6 solo, 7 asst
- MIN – Chad Greenway: 4 solo, 9 asst
- SEA – Bobby Wagner: 5 solo, 5 asst, sack, tfl

Team – pass – rush – total – to

- MIN – 44 – 243 – 287 – 2
- SEA – 190 – 195 – 385 – 0

With the win, the Seahawks improved to 5–4.

==== Week 10: vs. New York Jets ====
Week Ten: New York Jets at Seattle Seahawks – Game summary

| Quarter | 1 | 2 | 3 | 4 | Total |
|---|---|---|---|---|---|
| Jets | 7 | 0 | 0 | 0 | 7 |
| Seahawks | 7 | 7 | 0 | 14 | 28 |

at CenturyLink Field, Seattle, Washington

- Date: November 11
- Game time: 1:05 p.m. local
- Game weather: cloudy, 43 °F (6 °C), 66% humidity, wind SW 2 miles per hour (3.2 km/h)
- Game attendance: 67,841
- Referee: Ed Hochuli
- TV announcers (CBS): Marv Albert & Rich Gannon
- Gamecenter, Gamebook

Game information

First quarter

- SEA – Golden Tate 38-yard pass from Russell Wilson (Steven Hauschka kick), 8:01 (SEA 7–0)
- NYJ – Muhammad Wilkerson 21-yard fumble return (Nick Folk kick), 2:50 (Tied 7–7)

Second quarter

- SEA – Marshawn Lynch 1-yard run (Steven Hauschka kick), 2:04 (SEA 14–7)

Third quarter

- No scoring plays

Fourth quarter

- SEA – Sidney Rice 31-yard pass from Russell Wilson (Steven Hauschka kick), 13:33 (SEA 21–7)
- SEA – Sidney Rice 23-yard pass from Golden Tate (Steven Hauschka kick), 7:59 (SEA 28–7)

Top passers

- NYJ – Mark Sanchez: 9/22, 124 yds, 1 INT
- SEA – Russell Wilson: 12/19, 188 yds, 2 TD

Top rushers

- NYJ – Shonn Greene: 15 car, 58 yds
- SEA – Marshawn Lynch: 27 car, 124 yds, 1 TD

Top receivers

- NYJ – Jeremy Kerley: 5 rec, 57 yds
- SEA – Sidney Rice: 2 rec, 54 yds, 2 TD

Top tacklers

- NYJ – Bryan Thomas: 4 solo, 3 asst, 0.5 sack
- NYJ – Muhammad Wilkerson: 4 solo, 3 asst, ff, fr
- SEA – Bobby Wagner: 2 solo, 7 asst

Team – pass – rush – total – to

- NYJ – 101 – 84 – 185 – 3
- SEA – 189 – 174 – 363 – 2

The Seahawks improved to 6–4.

==== Week 12: at Miami Dolphins ====
Week Twelve: Seattle Seahawks at Miami Dolphins – Game summary

| Quarter | 1 | 2 | 3 | 4 | Total |
|---|---|---|---|---|---|
| Seahawks | 0 | 7 | 7 | 7 | 21 |
| Dolphins | 0 | 7 | 0 | 17 | 24 |

at Sun Life Stadium, Miami Gardens, Florida

- Date: November 25
- Game time: 1:03 p.m. local
- Game weather: clear, 72 °F (22 °C), 51% humidity, wind WNW 6 miles per hour (9.7 km/h)
- Game attendance: 51,295
- Referee: Clete Blakeman
- TV announcers (Fox): Chris Myers, Tim Ryan & Jaime Maggio
- Gamecenter, Gamebook

Game information

First quarter

- No scoring plays

Second quarter

- MIA – Reggie Bush 21-yard run (Dan Carpenter kick), 5:13 (MIA 7–0)
- SEA – Anthony McCoy 3-yard pass from Russell Wilson (Steven Hauschka kick), 0:29 (Tied 7–7)

Third quarter

- SEA – Michael Robinson 4-yard pass from Russell Wilson (Steven Hauschka kick), 4:00 (SEA 14–7)

Fourth quarter

- MIA – Daniel Thomas 3-yard run (Dan Carpenter kick), 8:08 (Tied 14–14)
- SEA – Leon Washington 98-yard kick return (Steven Hauschka kick), 7:54 (SEA 21–14)
- MIA – Charles Clay 29-yard pass from Ryan Tannehill (Dan Carpenter kick), 5:13 (Tied 21–21)
- MIA – Dan Carpenter 43-yard field goal, 0:00 (MIA 24–21)

Top passers

- SEA – Russell Wilson: 21/27, 224 yds, 2 TD
- MIA – Ryan Tannehill: 18/26, 253 yds, 1 TD, 1 INT

Top rushers

- SEA – Marshawn Lynch: 19 car, 46 yds
- MIA – Reggie Bush: 14 car, 87 yds, 1 TD

Top receivers

- SEA – Golden Tate: 4 rec, 56 yds
- MIA – Davone Bess: 7 rec, 129 yds

Top tacklers

- SEA – Bobby Wagner: 7 solo, 2 asst, 2 pd, INT
- MIA – Karlos Dansby: 6 solo, 1 asst, tfl

Team – pass – rush – total – to

- SEA – 216 – 96 – 312 – 0
- MIA – 246 – 189 – 435 – 1

The Seahawks engaged in a back-and-forth affair, with six lead changes or ties. Russell Wilson touchdowns to Anthony McCoy and Golden Tate and a 98-yard Leon Washington kick return for a touchdown were answered by rushing scores from Reggie Bush and Daniel Thomas. With the Seahawks up 21–14, rookie Dolphins quarterback Ryan Tannehill found Charles Clay from 29 yards out. Tied 21–21, the Seahawks had to punt with 1:39 to go, and Tannehill drove the Dolphins in range for the winning Dan Carpenter field goal.

The game was interrupted briefly with 1:40 to go in the third quarter following a 19-yard Tannehill run; the sprinklers at Sun Life Stadium suddenly switched on, soaking the field for roughly one minute.

==== Week 13: at Chicago Bears ====
Week Thirteen: Seattle Seahawks at Chicago Bears – Game summary

| Quarter | 1 | 2 | 3 | 4 | OT | Total |
|---|---|---|---|---|---|---|
| Seahawks | 0 | 10 | 0 | 7 | 6 | 23 |
| Bears | 7 | 0 | 7 | 3 | 0 | 17 |

at Soldier Field, Chicago, Illinois

- Date: December 2
- Game time: 12:03 p.m. local
- Game weather: cloudy, 61 °F (16 °C), 76% humidity, wind W 4 miles per hour (6.4 km/h)
- Game attendance: 62,264
- Referee: Mike Carey
- TV announcers (Fox): Chris Myers, Tim Ryan & Jaime Maggio
- Gamecenter, Gamebook

Game information

First quarter

- CHI – Earl Bennett 12-yard pass from Jay Cutler (Robbie Gould kick), 8:33 (CHI 7–0)

Second quarter

- SEA – Marshawn Lynch 4-yard run (Steven Hauschka kick), 2:15 (Tied 7–7)
- SEA – Steven Hauschka 31-yard field goal, 0:05 (SEA 10–7)

Third quarter

- CHI – Matt Forte 12-yard pass from Jay Cutler (Robbie Gould kick), 3:10 (CHI 14–10)

Fourth quarter

- SEA – Golden Tate 14-yard pass from Russell Wilson (Steven Hauschka kick), 0:24 (SEA 17–14)
- CHI – Robbie Gould 46-yard field goal, 0:00 (Tied 17–17)

Overtime

- SEA – Sidney Rice 13-yard pass from Russell Wilson, 7:33 (SEA 23–17)

Top passers

- SEA – Russell Wilson: 23/37, 293 yds, 2 TD
- CHI – Jay Cutler: 17/26, 233 yds, 2 TD

Top rushers

- SEA – Marshawn Lynch: 19 car, 87 yds, 1 TD
- CHI – Matt Forte: 21 car, 66 yds

Top receivers

- SEA – Sidney Rice: 6 rec, 99 yds, 1 TD
- CHI – Brandon Marshall: 10 rec, 165 yds

Top tacklers

- SEA – Bobby Wagner: 9 solo, 2 asst, sack, tfl
- CHI – Charles Tillman: 8 solo, 1 asst, 2 pd, ff

Team – pass – rush – total – to

- SEA – 283 – 176 – 459 – 1
- CHI – 226 – 132 – 358 – 0

With their second road win, the Seahawks improved to 7–5.

==== Week 14: vs. Arizona Cardinals ====
Week Fourteen: Arizona Cardinals at Seattle Seahawks – Game summary

| Quarter | 1 | 2 | 3 | 4 | Total |
|---|---|---|---|---|---|
| Cardinals | 0 | 0 | 0 | 0 | 0 |
| Seahawks | 10 | 28 | 13 | 7 | 58 |

at CenturyLink Field, Seattle, Washington

- Date: December 9
- Game time: 1:26 p.m. local
- Game weather: rain, 48 °F (9 °C), 82% humidity, wind SE8 miles per hour (13 km/h)
- Game attendance: 67,685
- Referee: Carl Cheffers
- TV announcers (Fox): Chris Myers, Tim Ryan & Jaime Maggio
- Gamecenter, Gamebook

Game information

First quarter

- SEA – Stephen Hauschka 31-yard field goal, 10:04. Seahawks 3–0. Drive: 4 plays, 1 yard, 2:01.
- SEA – Marshawn Lynch 20-yard run (Stephen Hauschka kick), 2:04. Seahawks 10–0. Drive: 11 plays, 70 yards, 6:14.

Second quarter

- SEA – Marshawn Lynch 4-yard run (Stephen Hauschka kick), 14:53. Seahawks 17–0. Drive: 3 plays, 72 yards, 1:11.
- SEA – Richard Sherman 19-yard interception return (Stephen Hauschka kick), 10:12. Seahawks 24–0.
- SEA – Malcolm Smith fumble recovery (Stephen Hauschka kick), 6:31. Seahawks 31–0.
- SEA – Zach Miller 24-yard pass from Russell Wilson (Stephen Hauschka kick), 0:06. Seahawks 38–0. Drive: 7 plays, 48 yards, 0:13.

Third quarter

- SEA – Marshanw Lynch 33-yard run (Stephen Hauschka kick), 11:08. Seahawks 45–0. Drive: 7 plays, 86 yards, 3:52.
- SEA – Stephen Hauschka 28-yard field goal, 7:47. Seahawks 48–0. Drive: 6 plays, 15 yards, 2:36.
- SEA – Stephen Hauschka 32-yard field goal, 2:10. Seahawks 51–0. Drive: 6 plays, 26 yards, 2:43.

Fourth quarter

- SEA – Leon Washington 3-yard run (Stephen Hauschka kick), 2:32. Seahawks 58–0. Drive: 6 plays, 62 yards, 2:51.

Top passers

- ARI – John Skelton – 11/24, 74 yards, 4 INT
- SEA – Russell Wilson – 7/13, 148 yards, TD, INT

Top rushers

- ARI – William Powell – 5 rushes, 20 yards
- SEA – Marshawn Lynch – 11 rushes, 128 yards, 3 TD

Top receivers

- ARI – Andre Roberts – 3 receptions, 36 yards
- SEA – Anthony McCoy – 3 receptions, 105 yards

With the win the Seahawks secured their largest win in franchise history while handing the Cardinals their worst loss in franchise history and eliminating them from playoff contention. Netting 8 turnovers to boot as well as outgaining Arizona 493-154. Russell Wilson became the first QB since 1970 to start & win his first 6 games at home.

==== Week 15: at Buffalo Bills ====
Bills Toronto Series

Week Fifteen: Seattle Seahawks at Buffalo Bills – Game summary

| Quarter | 1 | 2 | 3 | 4 | Total |
|---|---|---|---|---|---|
| Seahawks | 14 | 17 | 16 | 3 | 50 |
| Bills | 7 | 10 | 0 | 0 | 17 |

at Rogers Centre, Toronto, Ontario, Canada

- Date: December 16
- Game time: 4:05 p.m. local
- Game weather: indoors
- Game attendance: 40,770
- Referee: Scott Green
- TV announcers (Fox): Dick Stockton, John Lynch & Jennifer Hale
- Gamecenter, Gamebook

Game information

First quarter

- SEA – Russell Wilson 14-yard run (Steven Hauschka kick), 10:00 (SEA 7–0)
- SEA – Russell Wilson 25-yard run (Steven Hauschka kick), 5:46 (SEA 14–0)
- BUF – C. J. Spiller 14-yard run (Rian Lindell kick), 0:34 (SEA 14–7)

Second quarter

- SEA – Steven Hauschka 19-yard field goal, 12:03 (SEA 17–7)
- SEA – Zach Miller 4-yard pass from Russell Wilson (Steven Hauschka kick), 10:10 (SEA 24–7)
- SEA – Russell Wilson 13-yard run (Steven Hauschka kick), 5:31 (SEA 31–7)
- BUF – Stevie Johnson 20-yard pass from Ryan Fitzpatrick (Rian Lindell kick), 1:10 (SEA 31–14)
- BUF – Rian Lindell 41-yard field goal, 0:00 (SEA 31–17)

Third quarter

- SEA – Marshawn Lynch 13-yard run (PAT failed), 12:18 (SEA 37–17)
- SEA – Steven Hauschka 33-yard field goal, 7:29 (SEA 40–17)
- SEA – Earl Thomas 57-yard interception return (Steven Hauschka kick), 6:13 (SEA 47–17)

Fourth quarter

- SEA – Steven Hauschka 23-yard field goal, 9:17 (SEA 50–17)

Top passers

- SEA – Russell Wilson: 14/23, 205 yds, 1 TD
- BUF – Ryan Fitzpatrick: 21/38, 217 yds, 1 TD, 2 INT

Top rushers

- SEA – Marshawn Lynch: 10 car, 113 yds, 1 TD
- BUF – C. J. Spiller: 17 car, 103 yds, 1 TD

Top receivers

- SEA – Sidney Rice: 4 rec, 76 yds
- BUF – Stevie Johnson: 8 rec, 115 yds, 1 TD

Top tacklers

- SEA – Bobby Wagner: 10 solo, 2 asst
- BUF – George Wilson: 8 solo, 2 asst

Team – pass – rush – total – to

- SEA – 196 – 270 – 466 – 0
- BUF – 215 – 118 – 333 – 3

With its third and final regular season road victory, Seattle rose to 9–5.

==== Week 16: vs. San Francisco 49ers ====
Week Sixteen: San Francisco 49ers at Seattle Seahawks – Game summary

| Quarter | 1 | 2 | 3 | 4 | Total |
|---|---|---|---|---|---|
| 49ers | 0 | 6 | 0 | 7 | 13 |
| Seahawks | 14 | 14 | 7 | 7 | 42 |

at CenturyLink Field, Seattle, Washington

- Date: December 23
- Game time: 5:31 p.m. local
- Game weather: rain, 45 °F (7 °C), 76% humidity, wind N 3 miles per hour (4.8 km/h)
- Game attendance: 68,161
- Referee: Bill Vinovich
- TV announcers (NBC): Al Michaels, Cris Collinsworth & Michele Tafoya
- Gamecenter, Gamebook

Game information

First quarter

- SEA – Marshawn Lynch 24-yard run (Steven Hauschka kick), 13:48 (SEA 7–0)
- SEA – Marshawn Lynch 9-yard pass from Russell Wilson (Steven Hauschka kick), 4:26 (SEA 14–0)

Second quarter

- SEA – Richard Sherman 90-yard blocked field goal return (Steven Hauschka kick), 14:05 (SEA 21–0)
- SF – David Akers 33-yard field goal, 10:19 (SEA 21–3)
- SEA – Anthony McCoy 6-yard pass from Russell Wilson (Steven Hauschka kick), 1:58 (SEA 28–3)
- SF – David Akers 54-yard field goal, 0:31 (SEA 28–6)

Third quarter

- SEA – Doug Baldwin 4-yard pass from Russell Wilson (Steven Hauschka kick), 3:22 (SEA 35–6)

Fourth quarter

- SEA – Doug Baldwin 6-yard pass from Russell Wilson (Steven Hauschka kick), 7:02 (SEA 42–6)
- SF – Delanie Walker 18-yard pass from Colin Kaepernick (David Akers kick), 1:40 (SEA 42–13)

Top passers

- SF – Colin Kaepernick: 19/36, 244 yds, 1 TD, 1 INT
- SEA – Russell Wilson: 15/21, 171 yds, 4 TD, 1 INT

Top rushers

- SF – Colin Kaepernick: 7 car, 31 yds
- SEA – Marshawn Lynch: 26 car, 111 yds, 1 TD

Top receivers

- SF – Michael Crabtree: 4 rec, 65 yds
- SEA – Doug Baldwin: 4 rec, 53 yds, 2 TD

Top tacklers

- SF – NaVorro Bowman: 4 solo, 12 asst, tfl
- SEA – Bobby Wagner: 4 solo, 5 asst

Team – pass – rush – total – to

- SF – 231 – 82 – 313 – 2
- SEA – 170 – 176 – 346 – 1

The game was flexed to air on NBC Sunday Night Football. The Seahawks won and clinched at least a playoff spot. In order to win the NFC West, the Seahawks needed to beat the St. Louis Rams at home the following week and have the 49ers lose to the Arizona Cardinals. A Packers loss to the Vikings would give Seattle a first round bye as well. However, a loss or a 49ers win would result in the Seahawks being the #5 seed, leaving them to head on the road for the wild-card round in January.

==== Week 17: vs. St. Louis Rams ====
Week Seventeen: St. Louis Rams at Seattle Seahawks – Game summary

| Quarter | 1 | 2 | 3 | 4 | Total |
|---|---|---|---|---|---|
| Rams | 0 | 7 | 3 | 3 | 13 |
| Seahawks | 0 | 3 | 10 | 7 | 20 |

at CenturyLink Field, Seattle, Washington

- Date: December 30
- Game time: 1:26 p.m. local
- Game weather: clear, 41 °F (5 °C), 77% humidity, wind WNW 1 mile per hour (1.6 km/h)
- Game attendance: 67,936
- Referee: Jeff Triplette
- TV announcers (Fox): Chris Myers, Tim Ryan & Jaime Maggio
- Gamecenter, Gamebook

Game information

First quarter

- No scoring plays

Second quarter

- SEA – Steven Hauschka 43-yard field goal, 10:40 (SEA 3–0)
- STL – Austin Pettis 2-yard pass from Sam Bradford (Greg Zuerlein kick), 6:03 (STL 7–3)

Third quarter

- SEA – Steven Hauschka 40-yard field goal, 10:41 (STL 7–6)
- STL – Greg Zuerlein 39-yard field goal, 5:31 (STL 10–6)
- SEA – Michael Robinson 10-yard pass from Russell Wilson (Steven Hauschka kick), 2:09 (SEA 13–10)

Fourth quarter

- STL – Greg Zuerlein 25-yard field goal, 11:23 (Tied 13–13)
- SEA – Russell Wilson 1-yard run (Steven Hauschka kick), 1:39 (SEA 20–13)

Top passers

- STL – Sam Bradford: 25/42, 252 yds, 1 TD, 1 INT
- SEA – Russell Wilson: 15/19, 250 yds, 1 TD

Top rushers

- STL – Steven Jackson: 11 car, 52 yds
- SEA – Marshawn Lynch: 18 car, 100 yds

Top receivers

- STL – Chris Givens: 2 rec, 54 yds
- SEA – Golden Tate: 3 rec, 105 yds

Top tacklers

- STL – Jo-Lonn Dunbar: 4 solo, 7 asst, sack, tfl, ff
- SEA – Bobby Wagner: 5 solo, 5 asst

Team – pass – rush – total – to

- STL – 252 – 79 – 331 – 1
- SEA – 209 – 153 – 362 – 0

With the NFC West title still up for grabs, the Seahawks finished their season at home against the Rams. Avoiding being swept by their foes, they finished the season with a record of 11–5, and a perfect 8–0 at home. However, with the Niners' win over the Cardinals, the team would end up 2nd in the division and the NFC's #5 seed.

=== Postseason ===
Seattle entered the postseason as the #5 seed in the NFC.

==== NFC Wild Card Playoff: at #4 Washington Redskins ====
NFC Wild Card Playoff: #5 Seattle Seahawks at #4 Washington Redskins – Game summary

| Quarter | 1 | 2 | 3 | 4 | Total |
|---|---|---|---|---|---|
| Seahawks | 0 | 13 | 0 | 11 | 24 |
| Redskins | 14 | 0 | 0 | 0 | 14 |

at FedExField, Landover, Maryland

- Date: January 6, 2013
- Game time: 4:40 p.m. local
- Game weather: cloudy, 52 °F (11 °C), 44% humidity, wind SW 3 miles per hour (4.8 km/h)
- Game attendance: 84,325
- Referee: Pete Morelli
- TV announcers (Fox): Joe Buck, Troy Aikman & Pam Oliver
- Gamecenter, Gamebook

Game information

First quarter

- WAS – Evan Royster 4-yard pass from Robert Griffin III (Kai Forbath kick), 9:57 (WAS 7–0)
- WAS – Logan Paulsen 4-yard pass from Robert Griffin III (Kai Forbath kick), 2:26 (WAS 14–0)

Second quarter

- SEA – Steven Hauschka 32-yard field goal, 12:05 (WAS 14–3)
- SEA – Michael Robinson 4-yard pass from Russell Wilson (Steven Hauschka kick), 4:38 (WAS 14–10)
- SEA – Steven Hauschka 29-yard field goal, 0:00 (WAS 14–13)

Third quarter

- No scoring plays

Fourth quarter

- SEA – Marshawn Lynch 27-yard run (Russell Wilson completes pass to Zach Miller for 2-point conversion), 7:08 (SEA 21–14)
- SEA – Steven Hauschka 22-yard field goal, 5:32 (SEA 24–14)

Top passers

- SEA – Russell Wilson: 15/26, 187 yds, 1 TD
- WAS – Robert Griffin III: 10/19, 84 yds, 2 TD, 1 INT

Top rushers

- SEA – Marshawn Lynch: 20 car, 132 yds, 1 TD
- WAS – Alfred Morris: 16 car, 80 yds

Top receivers

- SEA – Zach Miller: 4 rec, 48 yds
- WAS – Pierre Garçon: 4 rec, 50 yds

Top tacklers

- SEA – Bobby Wagner: 5 solo, 4 asst, tfl
- WAS – London Fletcher: 5 solo, 10 asst, 0.5 sack, pd

Team – pass – rush – total – to

- SEA – 156 – 224 – 380 – 1
- WAS – 99 – 104 – 203 – 2

After Redskins quarterback Robert Griffin III went down with a knee injury in the second half, Seattle outscored Washington 3-0 to win 24-14. Seattle would move on to take on the #1 seed Atlanta Falcons.

==== NFC Divisional Playoff: at #1 Atlanta Falcons ====
NFC Divisional Playoff: #5 Seattle Seahawks at #1 Atlanta Falcons – Game summary

| Quarter | 1 | 2 | 3 | 4 | Total |
|---|---|---|---|---|---|
| Seahawks | 0 | 0 | 7 | 21 | 28 |
| Falcons | 10 | 10 | 7 | 3 | 30 |

at Georgia Dome, Atlanta, Georgia

- Date: January 13, 2013
- Game time: 1:05 p.m. local
- Game weather: indoors
- Referee: Walt Coleman
- TV announcers (Fox): Thom Brennaman, Brian Billick, Laura Okmin & Chris Myers
- Gamecenter, Gamebook

Game information

First quarter

- ATL – Matt Bryant 39-yard field goal, 9:40 (ATL 3–0)
- ATL – Tony Gonzalez 1-yard pass from Matt Ryan (Matt Bryant kick), 3:10 (ATL 10–0)

Second quarter

- ATL – Matt Bryant 37-yard field goal, 9:13 (ATL 13–0)
- ATL – Roddy White 1-yard pass from Matt Ryan (Matt Bryant kick), 4:16 (ATL 20–0)

Third quarter

- SEA – Golden Tate 29-yard pass from Russell Wilson (Ryan Longwell kick), 9:47 (ATL 20–7)
- ATL – Jason Snelling 5-yard pass from Matt Ryan (Matt Bryant kick), 2:11 (ATL 27–7)

Fourth quarter

- SEA – Russell Wilson 1-yard run (Ryan Longwell kick), 13:01 (ATL 27–14)
- SEA – Zach Miller 3-yard pass from Russell Wilson (Ryan Longwell kick), 9:13 (ATL 27–21)
- SEA – Marshawn Lynch 2-yard run (Ryan Longwell kick), 0:31 (SEA 28–27)
- ATL – Matt Bryant 49-yard field goal, 0:08 (ATL 30–28)

Top passers

- SEA – Russell Wilson: 24/36, 385 yds, 2 TD, 1 INT
- ATL – Matt Ryan: 24/35, 250 yds, 3 TD, 2 INT

Top rushers

- SEA – Russell Wilson: 7 car, 60 yds, 1 TD
- ATL – Michael Turner: 17 car, 98 yds

Top receivers

- SEA – Zach Miller: 8 rec, 142 yds, 1 TD
- ATL – Roddy White: 5 rec, 76 yds, 1 TD

Top tacklers

- SEA – Bobby Wagner: 7 solo, 1 asst, INT, pd
- SEA – K. J. Wright: 5 solo, 3 asst, 2 tfl, pd
- ATL – Sean Weatherspoon: 5 solo, 3 asst, pd, ff
- ATL – Akeem Dent: 4 solo, 4 asst

Team – pass – rush – total – to

- SEA – 368 – 123 – 491 – 2
- ATL – 250 – 167 – 417 – 2

The Seahawks fell behind, trailing Atlanta 20–0 at halftime and 27–7 with just over 17 minutes remaining. Seattle scored three touchdowns in the fourth quarter to take the lead 28–27 with 31 seconds left to play. But Matt Ryan quickly completed two long passes. A mystery time out, credited to Seattle, was blown by officials just as Matt Bryant kicked and missed a 49-yard field goal try, allowing Atlanta to kick again and giving them the victory. Russell Wilson's Hail Mary pass on the final play was intercepted by Julio Jones in the end zone (Wilson's only interception in the game), ending Seattle's season.
