= Dudley Guice Jr. =

American gridiron football player (born 1986)

No. 84
- Position: Wide receiver

Personal information
- Born: May 28, 1986 (age 40); Fayette, Mississippi, U.S.
- Listed height: 6 ft 3 in (1.91 m)
- Listed weight: 217 lb (98 kg)

Career information
- High school: Trinity Episcopal Day School (Natchez, Mississippi)
- College: Northwestern State

Career history
- Tennessee Titans (2009)*; Winnipeg Blue Bombers (2009); Indianapolis Colts (2010)*; Spokane Shock (2011)
- * Offseason or practice squad member only

Career CFL statistics
- Receptions: 6
- Receiving yards: 76
- Stats at CFL.ca (archived)

Dudley Guice Jr. (born May 28, 1986) is an American former football wide receiver and current Atlanta, Georgia, police officer. He was signed by the Tennessee Titans as an undrafted free agent in 2009. He played college football at Northwestern State.

Guice also played for the Winnipeg Blue Bombers and the Indianapolis Colts. The Spokane Shock added Guice to the 2011 roster.

== Early life ==
Guice was born in Fayette, Mississippi, and attended high school at Trinity Episcopal Day School in Natchez. He was an All-South State selection for the Trinity Saints.

He finished his collegiate career at Northwestern State with 78 catches for 1,213 yards and 11 TD. As a Senior in 2008, he had 35 catches for 606 yards with 6 TD.

== Professional career ==
=== Pre-draft ===
Before the draft, Guice played in the Texas vs. The Nation game and caught a 22-yard touchdown in a game described as a "standout performance".

He also had an impressive pro day workout running a 4.40 40 yard dash, jumping 39" in the vertical jump, jumping 10'5" in the standing broad jump, and running a 4.01 in the 20 yard shuttle and 6.61 in the 3 cone drill.

=== Tennessee Titans ===
Guice became an undrafted free agent for the Tennessee Titans. He went through the preseason before being waived prior to the start of the 2009 NFL season.

=== Winnipeg Blue Bombers ===
Guice signed with the Winnipeg Blue Bombers on September 11, 2009. He appeared in three games for the Blue Bombers as a rookie, catching six passes for 76 yards.

=== Indianapolis Colts ===
Guice signed a future contract with the Indianapolis Colts on January 6, 2010. He was waived August 28, 2010.

== Resources ==
- Official website
- Stats Crew
- Northwestern State Demons bio
- Tennessee Titans bio
- Winnipeg Blue Bombers bio
