= Winston Guy =

American football player (born 1990)

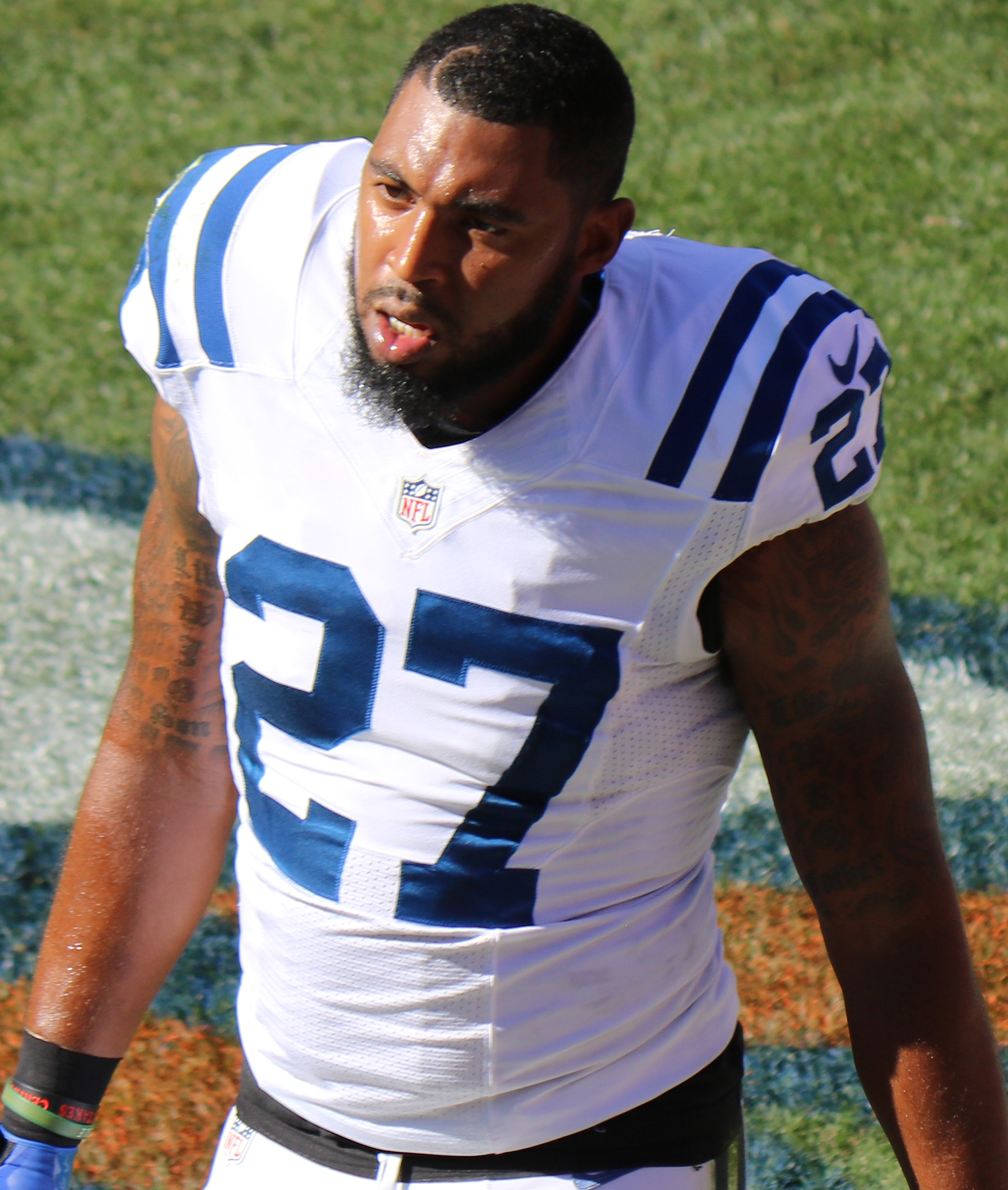
- Guy with the Indianapolis Colts in 2016

No. 27, 22
- Position: Safety

Personal information
- Born: April 23, 1990 (age 36); Lexington, Kentucky, U.S.
- Listed height: 6 ft 1 in (1.85 m)
- Listed weight: 218 lb (99 kg)

Career information
- High school: Catholic (Lexington)
- College: Kentucky
- NFL draft: 2012: 6th round, 181st overall pick

Career history
- Seattle Seahawks (2012); Jacksonville Jaguars (2013–2014); Indianapolis Colts (2014–2016)

Awards and highlights
- Second-team All-SEC (2011)

Career NFL statistics
- Total tackles: 53
- Sacks: 2
- Forced fumbles: 1
- Pass deflections: 2
- Stats at Pro Football Reference

Winston Guy Jr. (born April 23, 1990) is an American former professional football player who was a safety in the National Football League (NFL). He played college football for the Kentucky Wildcats. Guy was selected by the Seattle Seahawks in the sixth round of the 2012 NFL draft. He also played for the Jacksonville Jaguars and Indianapolis Colts.

== Professional career ==
External videos
- Guy's NFL Combine workout

Pre-draft measurables
Height	Weight	Arm length	Hand span	40-yard dash	10-yard split	20-yard split	20-yard shuttle	Three-cone drill	Vertical jump	Broad jump
6 ft 1 in (1.85 m)	218 lb (99 kg)	33 in (0.84 m)	9 in (0.23 m)	4.70 s	1.65 s	2.73 s	4.29 s	6.79 s	36 in (0.91 m)	9 ft 7 in (2.92 m)
All values are from NFL Combine and Pro Day

Guy was selected in the sixth round (181st overall) by the Seattle Seahawks in the 2012 NFL draft. On August 31, 2013, Guy was released by the Seahawks during final team cuts.

Guy was claimed off waivers by the Jacksonville Jaguars on September 1, 2013. After starting at safety the first three weeks of 2014 season, he was released on September 29, 2014.

On October 3, 2014, Guy was signed to the Colts' practice squad. He was released by the Colts on September 20, 2016.

=== Statistics ===
Source: NFL.com

Year	Team	G	GS	Tackles					Interceptions						Fumbles	
Year	Team	G	GS	Total	Solo	Ast	Sck	SFTY	PDef	Int	Yds	Avg	Lng	TDs	FF	FR
Regular season
2012	SEA	2	0	0	0	0	0.0	0	0	0	0	0.0	0	0	0	0
2013	JAC	14	2	29	22	7	1.0	0	1	0	0	0.0	0	0	1	0
2014	JAC	4	3	14	10	4	1.0	0	1	0	0	0.0	0	0	0	0
2015	IND	12	0	6	4	2	0.0	0	0	0	0	0.0	0	0	0	0
2016	IND	2	0	4	3	1	0.0	0	0	0	0	0.0	0	0	0	0
Total		34	5	53	39	14	2.0	0	2	0	0	0.0	0	0	1	0
Postseason
2012	SEA	1	0	2	2	0	0.0	0	0	0	0	0.0	0	0	0	0
Total		1	0	2	2	0	0.0	0	0	0	0	0.0	0	0	0	0
