= Stephen Hauschka =

American football player (born 1985)

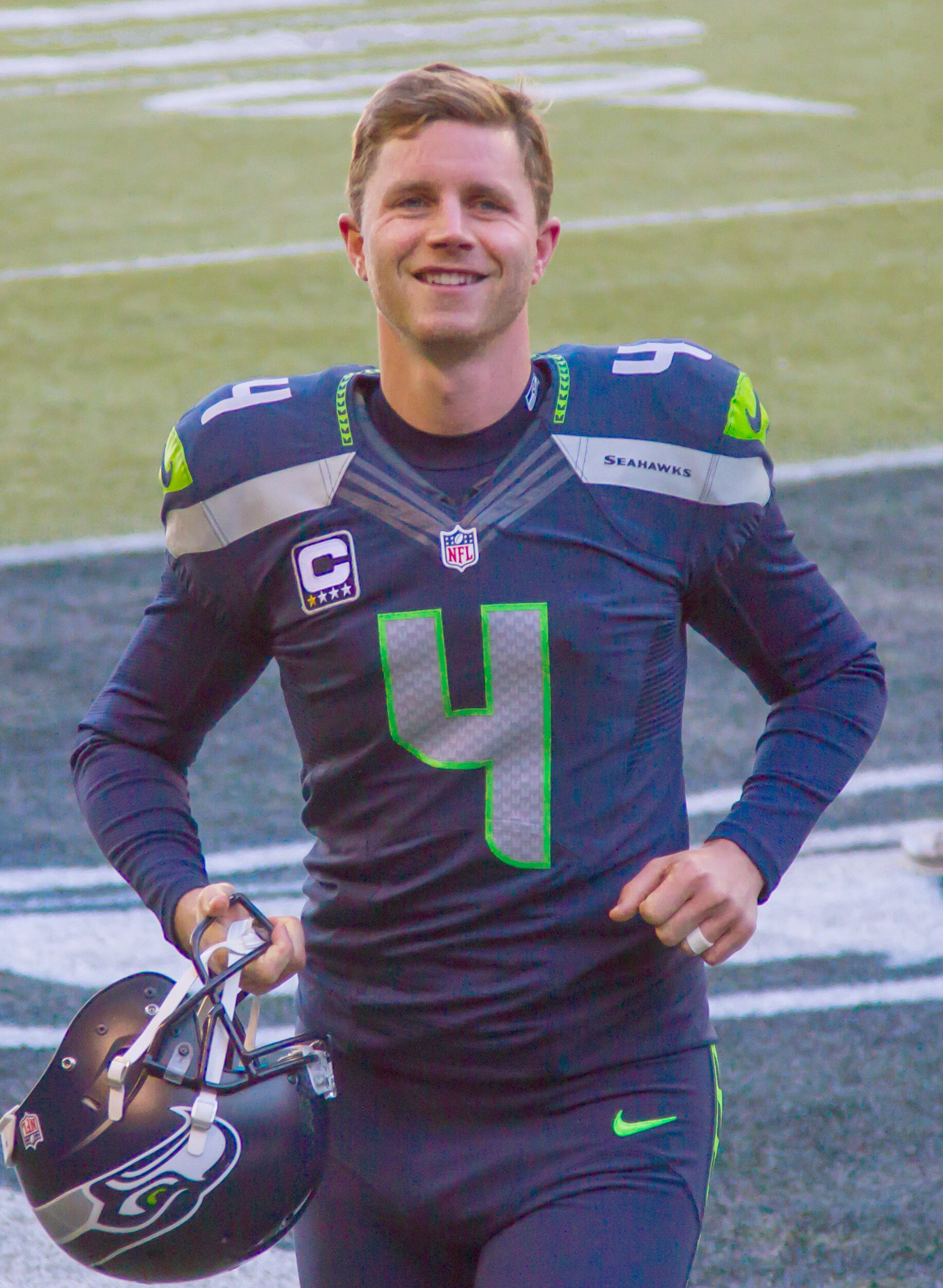
- Hauschka with the Seattle Seahawks in 2014

No. 6, 3, 4, 9
- Position: Placekicker

Personal information
- Born: June 29, 1985 (age 41); Needham, Massachusetts, U.S.
- Listed height: 6 ft 4 in (1.93 m)
- Listed weight: 210 lb (95 kg)

Career information
- High school: Needham
- College: Middlebury (2004–2006); NC State (2007)
- NFL draft: 2008: undrafted

Career history
- Minnesota Vikings (2008)*; Baltimore Ravens (2008–2009); Atlanta Falcons (2009); Detroit Lions (2010)*; Las Vegas Locomotives (2010); Denver Broncos (2010); Seattle Seahawks (2011–2016); Buffalo Bills (2017–2019); Jacksonville Jaguars (2020)
- * Offseason or practice squad member only

Awards and highlights
- Super Bowl champion (XLVIII); UFL champion (2010); First-team All-NESCAC (2006); 2× Second-team All-NESCAC (2004, 2005)

Career NFL statistics
- Field goals made: 264
- Field goals attempted: 310
- Field goal %: 85.2
- Longest field goal: 58
- Touchbacks: 375
- Stats at Pro Football Reference

Stephen Theodore Hauschka (born June 29, 1985) is an American former professional football player who was a placekicker in the National Football League (NFL). He was signed by the Minnesota Vikings as an undrafted free agent in 2008. He played college football at Middlebury College and for the North Carolina State Wolfpack.

Hauschka was also a member of the Baltimore Ravens, Atlanta Falcons, Detroit Lions, Las Vegas Locomotives, Denver Broncos, Seattle Seahawks, Buffalo Bills, and Jacksonville Jaguars. He won Super Bowl XLVIII as a member of the Seahawks.

== Early life ==
Stephen Hauschka grew up in Needham, Massachusetts, where he played on the Needham High School Rockets varsity soccer team, varsity basketball, and the varsity lacrosse team. He also played trombone in the NHS concert band and NHS jazz band. He did not play football for the Rockets. He graduated in 2003 and went to Middlebury College with intent to play Division III soccer for the Panthers.

== College career ==
=== Middlebury College ===
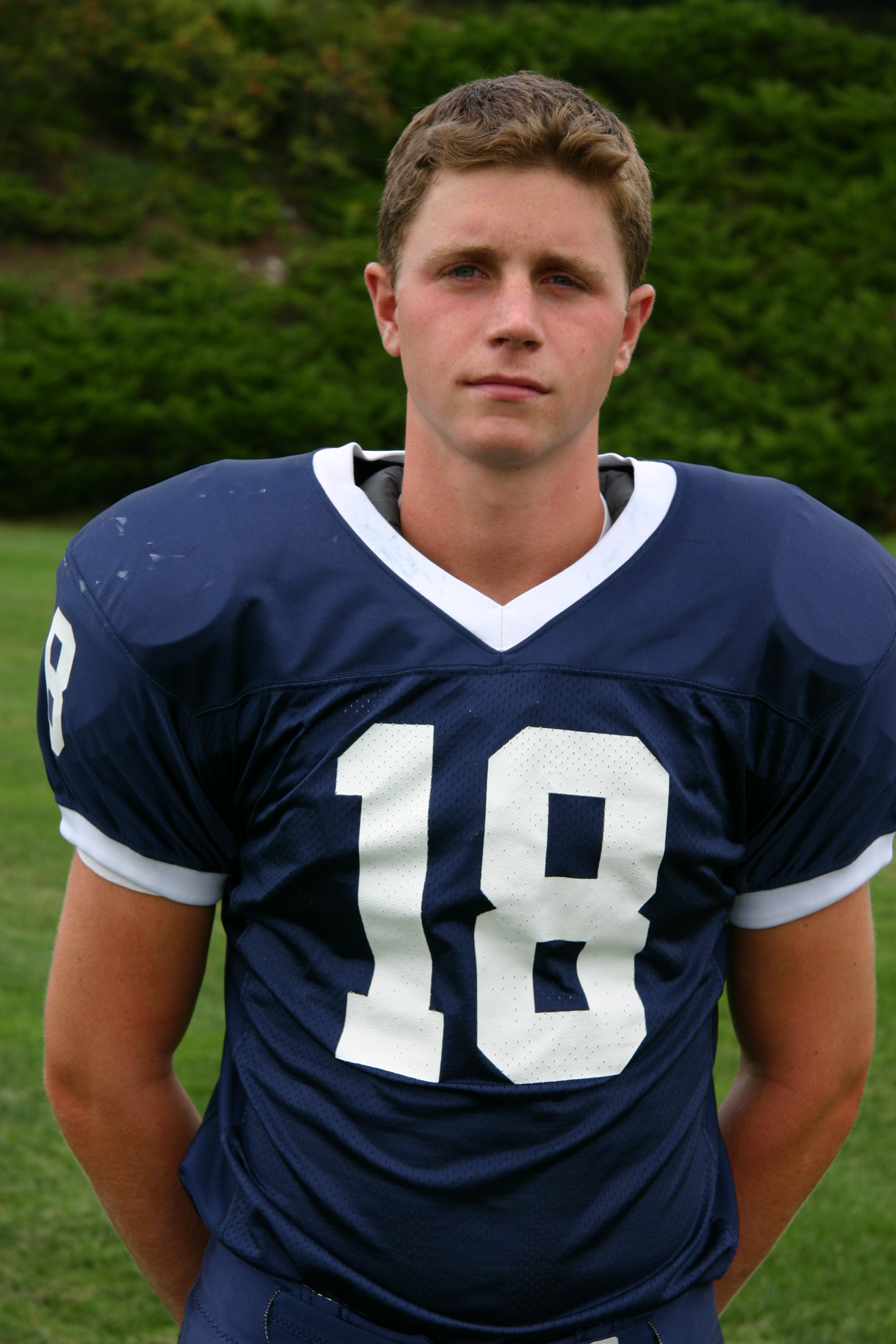
Hauschka at Middlebury College (2005)

In 2003, Hauschka was cut from the Middlebury Panthers men's varsity soccer team and finished the season on junior varsity. Prior to his sophomore soccer season, Hauschka was urged by his friend, Scott Secor, to try out for the football team, where he edged out freshman recruit Jacob Lister for the starting kicker role. In his three seasons with the Panthers, he was a two-time All-NESCAC selection as both a kicker and punter. He owns the school's single-season record for field goals. He was named a District I Academic All-American by College Sports Information Directors Association (CoSIDA) during his senior year. He was a semi-finalist for the Lou Groza Award for the top college football placekicker. Hauschka was also a member of the Middlebury College lacrosse team. Hauschka graduated from Middlebury College with a B.A. in neuroscience in 2007.

=== North Carolina State ===
After graduating with honors from Middlebury College, Hauschka decided to forgo an acceptance to dental school and enrolled as a graduate student at North Carolina State in 2007. Since Hauschka was cut from the Middlebury College men's varsity soccer team during his freshman season, he retained one year of eligibility and won the kicking job for the Wolfpack. He then went 25-for-25 on extra points and 16-for-18 on field goals, which included a game-winning kick versus the Miami Hurricanes.

At North Carolina State, his first name was misspelled as "Steven," a spelling which he continued to use into his professional career.

== Professional career ==
=== Minnesota Vikings ===
Hauschka was signed by the Minnesota Vikings in 2008 to share kicking duties with Ryan Longwell in the preseason. He would later be released by the team.

=== Baltimore Ravens ===
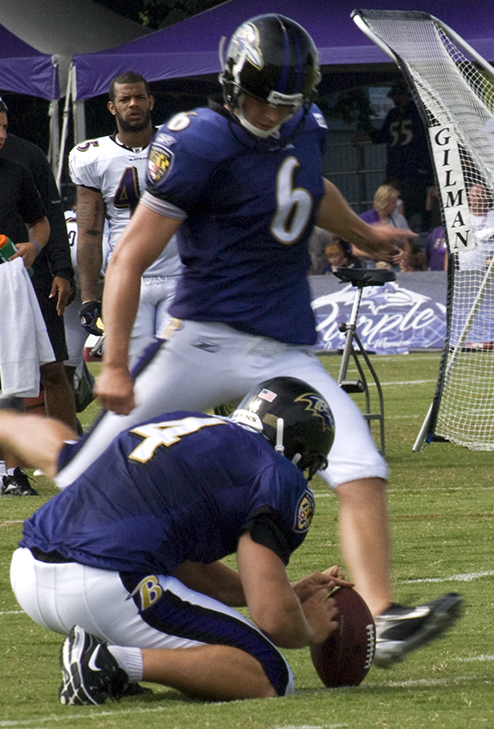
Hauschka with the Baltimore Ravens in 2009

Hauschka was claimed off waivers by the Baltimore Ravens after being released by the Vikings. He was signed to the Ravens' practice squad on September 15, 2008. He was activated on October 30 to handle the long-range field goals and kickoffs, sharing kicking duties with longtime Ravens kicker Matt Stover. His first professional field goal attempt came on November 9, 2008, against the Houston Texans, where he successfully hit a 54-yard field goal.

An exclusive-rights free agent in the 2009 off-season, Hauschka was re-signed on March 17 as the Ravens chose not to re-sign Stover. On November 17, 2009, the Ravens released Hauschka, after he missed his fourth attempt of the season (he converted 9 of 13 field goals (69.2%) in 2009) and had an extra point blocked.

After his release from the Ravens, Hauschka tried out for the Atlanta Falcons on November 24, 2009, and for the Dallas Cowboys on December 21.

=== Atlanta Falcons ===
Hauschka was signed by the Atlanta Falcons on December 29, 2009, after an injury to placekicker Matt Bryant. He was waived by the team on August 15, 2010.

=== Detroit Lions ===
Hauschka was claimed off waivers by the Detroit Lions on August 18, 2010. He played two preseason games for the Lions due to Lions' starter Jason Hanson's leg surgery. He was waived by the Lions on September 4, 2010.

=== Las Vegas Locomotives ===
Hauschka was signed by the UFL's Las Vegas Locomotives on October 4, 2010. On October 8, Hauschka tied the UFL record with three field goals in a single game.

=== Denver Broncos ===
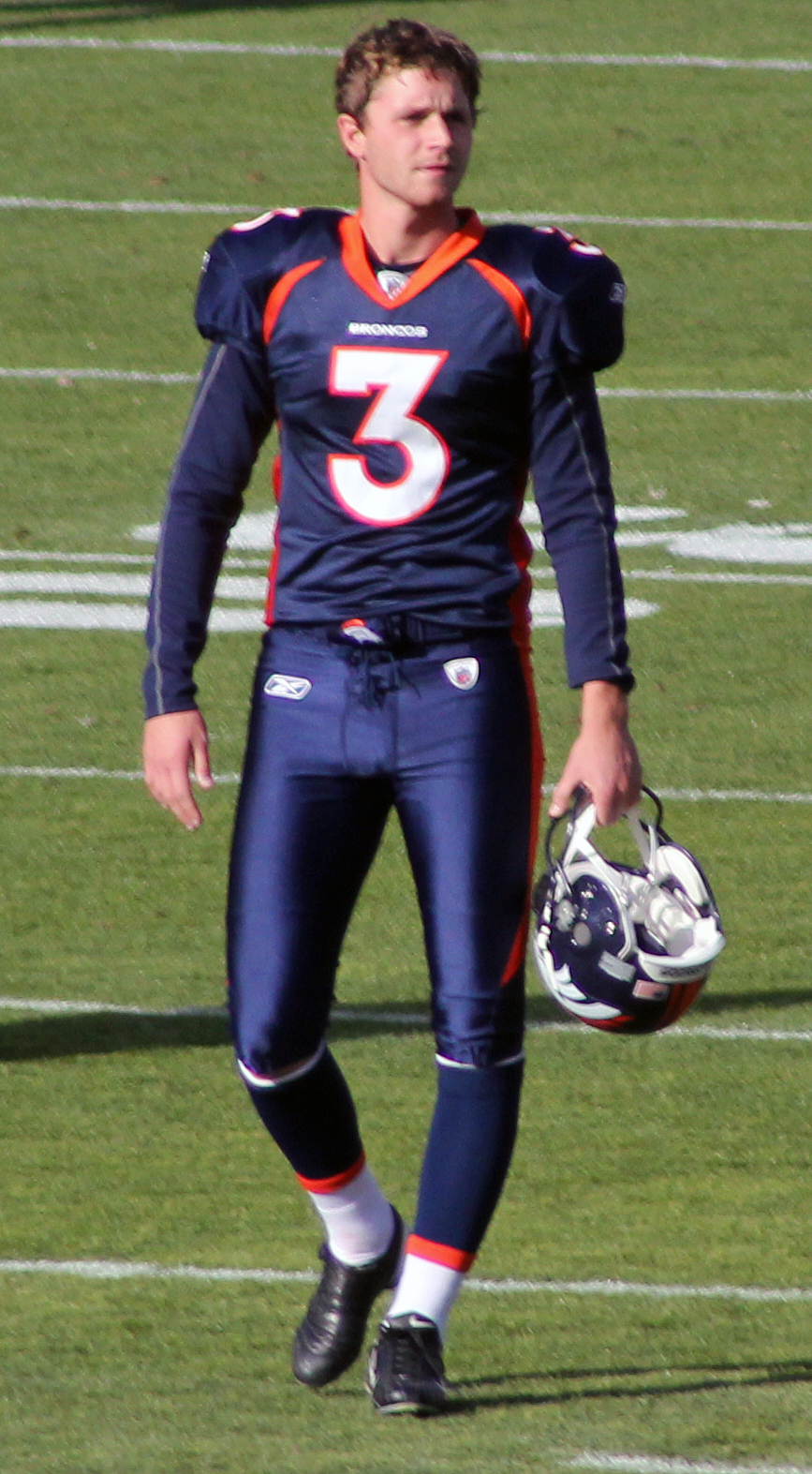
Hauschka during his tenure with the Denver Broncos

On December 12, 2010, the Denver Broncos signed Hauschka after a season-ending groin injury to Matt Prater. He appeared in four games for the Broncos in the 2010 season. He was waived by the team on September 3, 2011.

=== Seattle Seahawks ===
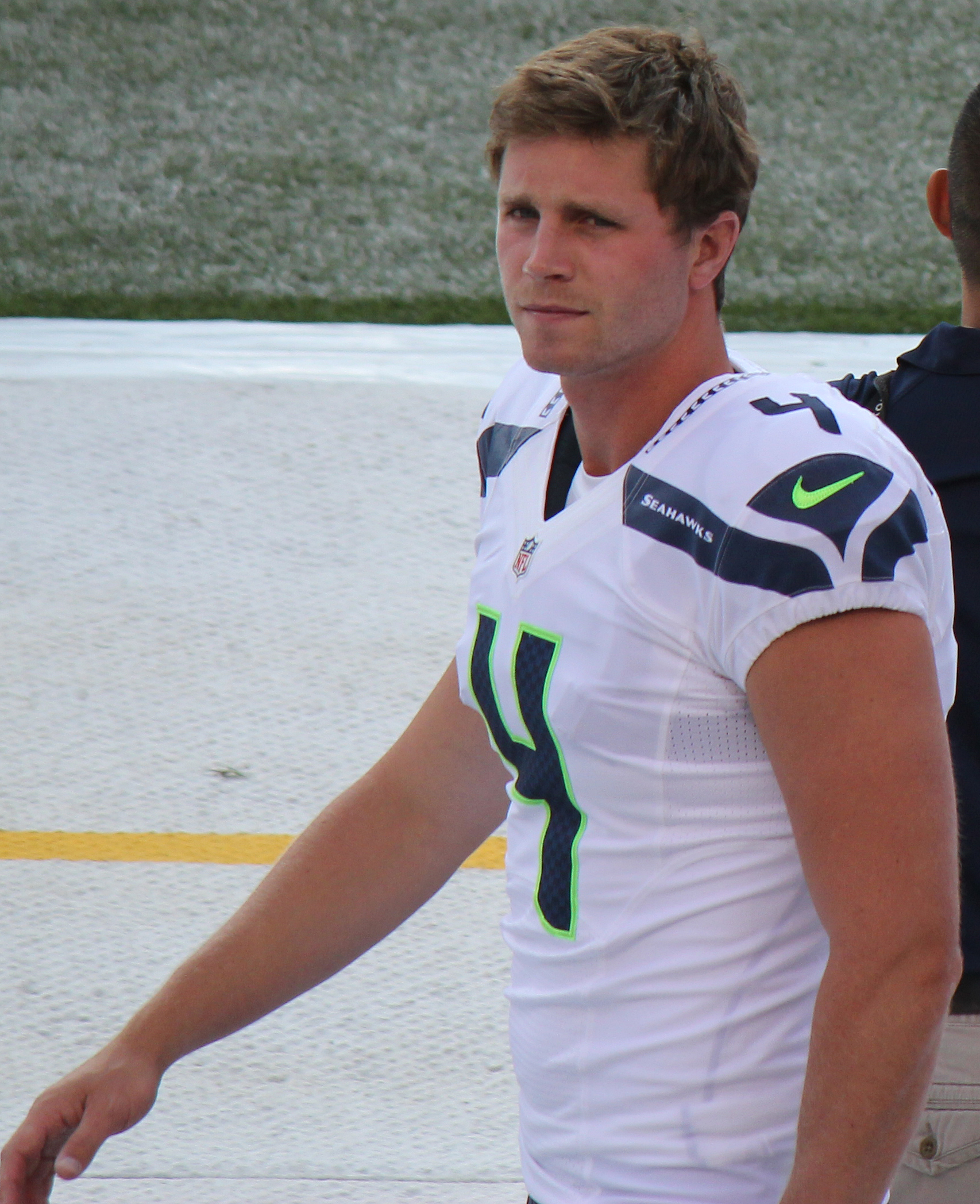
Hauschka in the 2012 preseason as a member of the Seattle Seahawks

Hauschka was claimed off waivers by the Seattle Seahawks on September 4, 2011.

In a Week 10 match-up against the Baltimore Ravens, Hauschka tied a then Seahawks' record for most field goals in a game, by scoring five of them, leading Seattle to a 22–17 upset. In the 2011 season, he converted 25 of 30 field goal attempts and all 34 extra point attempts.

In the 2012 season, Hauschka converted 24 of 27 field goal attempts and 46 of 48 extra point attempts. In the wild-card round against the Washington Redskins, Hauschka strained his calf, and was placed on injured reserve. On April 18, 2013, the Seahawks re-signed Hauschka.

In Week 4 of the 2013 season, Hauschka kicked a 45-yard field goal to give the Seahawks a come-from-behind overtime victory against the Houston Texans at Reliant Stadium. He finished the 2013 season converting 33 of 35 field goal attempts and all 44 extra point attempts. The final score was 23–20, after trailing the Texans, 20–3, in the first half. Thanks to Hauschka's game-winning kick, the Seahawks went 4–0 for the first time in franchise history. The Seahawks finished 13–3 and reached Super Bowl XLVIII, where they defeated the Denver Broncos, 43–8.

On March 17, 2014, the Seahawks re-signed Hauschka to a three-year contract worth $9.15 million, of which $3.35 million was guaranteed. He finished the 2014 season converting 31 of 37 field goal attempts and all 41 extra point attempts.

Hauschka began the 2015 season by hitting his first 16 field-goal attempts, including four from 50 yards or more. He was named an alternate for the 2016 Pro Bowl. In the 2015 season, he converted 29 of 31 field goal attempts and 40 of 44 extra point attempts.

In the 2016 season, Hauschka converted 33 of 37 field goal attempts and 29 of 35 extra point attempts.

=== Buffalo Bills ===
On March 9, 2017, Hauschka signed a three-year contract with the Buffalo Bills. Competing against rookie Austin Rehkow for a roster spot, Hauschka won the competition on August 20. His kicking style, involving low line-drive kicks (which was one of the reasons the Seahawks, who preferred someone with a higher kick trajectory, did not re-sign him), was considered one of his strengths for Buffalo, as the greater power of a line-drive kick can counteract windy conditions.

On September 10, 2017, in the season-opening 21–12 victory over the New York Jets, Hauschka made his debut as a Bill. He converted three extra points in the win. In Week 3, Hauschka went 4-for-4 on field goals, including a 55-yarder, and converted all extra-point attempts, earning him AFC Special Teams Player of the Week. The following week, he was a perfect 3-for-3 on field goals including a tie-breaking 56-yarder in a 23–17 win over the Falcons, earning him his second straight AFC Special Teams Player of the Week.

Hauschka broke the NFL record for most consecutive field goals made from 50 yards or beyond after he made a 50-yard field goal against the Los Angeles Chargers on November 19, 2017. He finished the 2017 season converting 29 of 33 field goal attempts and all 29 extra point attempts.

In Week 10 of the 2018 season, Hauschka made all seven of his kicks, five extra points and two field goals, including a season-long 54-yarder, in a 41–10 win over the New York Jets, earning him AFC Special Teams Player of the Week. During the rematch against the Jets in week 14, Hauschka was hit in the back by Jets defensive end Henry Anderson following a blocked field goal attempt, suffering an injured hip on the play. He finished the 2018 season converting 22 of 28 field goal attempts and 25 of 26 extra points.

On August 28, 2019, Hauschka signed a two-year, $8 million contract extension with the Bills. He finished the 2019 season converting 30 of 32 extra point attempts and 22 of 28 field goal attempts.

On August 27, 2020, Hauschka was released by the Bills after the team selected Tyler Bass in the 2020 draft.

=== Jacksonville Jaguars ===
On September 28, 2020, Hauschka was signed by the Jacksonville Jaguars. In his first game with the team, he missed both of his field goal attempts, from 24 yards and 49 yards, and was subsequently released on October 12. Hauschka announced his retirement from football on December 4, 2020.

== NFL career statistics ==
Legend
	Won the Super Bowl
**Bold**	Career high

Year	Team	GP	Field goals									Extra points			Total points
Year	Team	GP	FGM	FGA	FG%	<20	20−29	30−39	40−49	50+	Lng	XPM	XPA	XP%	Total points
2008	BAL	8	1	2	50.0	0–0	0–0	0–0	0–0	1–2	54	0	0	0.0	3
2009	BAL	9	9	13	69.2	0–0	1–1	5–7	3–5	0–0	44	27	28	96.4	54
2010	DEN	4	6	7	85.7	0–0	9–9	3–3	2–3	0–0	46	10	10	100.0	28
2011	SEA	16	25	30	83.3	2–2	5–6	9–10	7–8	2–4	52	34	34	100.0	109
2012	SEA	16	24	27	88.9	1–1	7–7	10–10	5–5	1–4	52	46	48	95.8	118
2013	SEA	16	33	35	94.3	0–0	10–11	9–9	11–12	3–3	53	44	44	100.0	143
2014	SEA	16	31	37	83.8	0–0	10–10	10–10	9–13	2–4	58	41	41	100.0	134
2015	SEA	16	29	31	93.5	0–0	9–9	7–7	7–9	6–6	54	40	44	90.9	127
2016	SEA	16	33	37	89.2	0–0	11–13	13–13	8–10	1–1	53	29	35	82.8	128
2017	BUF	16	29	33	87.9	0–0	6–6	9–9	7–9	7–9	56	29	29	100.0	116
2018	BUF	16	22	28	78.6	0–0	3–3	8–8	7–10	4–7	54	25	26	96.1	91
2019	BUF	16	22	28	78.6	0–0	5–5	7–8	9–10	1–5	51	30	32	93.7	96
2020	JAX	1	0	2	0.0	0–0	0–1	0–0	0–0	0–1	0	2	2	100.0	2
Total		166	264	310	85.2	3–3	68–73	90–94	75–95	28–45	58	357	373	95.7	1149

== Career highlights ==
=== Awards and honors ===
NFL

- Super Bowl champion (XLVIII)

UFL

- UFL champion (2010)

College

- First-team All-NESCAC (2006)
- 2× Second-team All-NESCAC (2004, 2005)

=== Records ===
==== Bills franchise records ====
- Most 50+ yard field goals made in a season: 7, 2017

==== Seahawks franchise records ====
- Most field goals made in franchise playoff history: 19
- Most points scored in franchise playoff history: 84
- Most consecutive games scoring: 94
- Highest points per game in a career: 7.9
- Highest field goal percentage in a career: 88.8

== Personal life ==
Hauschka married fellow Middlebury alumna Lindsey Jones in June 2011 shortly after her graduation from Boston College Law School.
