= Sarah Gray Miller =

American journalist

Sarah Gray Miller is a former editor-in-chief of the American monthly lifestyle and decorating magazine Country Living, a Hearst Corporation publication. She later became editor of Modern Farmer, and currently serves as editor of Saveur.

== Early years ==
Miller is the daughter of Ron and Mary Warren ("Mimi") Miller. She is from Natchez, Mississippi, where she attended Trinity Episcopal Day School. While at Vassar College, she majored in English and political science, graduating in 1993.

== Career ==
Miller held various jobs at Meigher Communications and Garden Design Magazine before helping start-up Organic Style Magazine. She went on to become editor of Budget Living magazine, and O at Home magazine. In 2008, she replaced Nancy Soriano as Editor-in-Chief of Country Living. It was announced in October 2013 that Miller was leaving Country Living. In February 2015, Miller was hired as Editor-in-Chief of Modern Farmer, where she served until June 2018. In August 2019, Miller was named Editor-in-Chief of Saveur, a quarterly food magazine.

== Personal life ==
She was married to photographer, Tony Stamolis.
