= Modern Farmer (magazine) =

American quarterly magazine

- Cover of issue 01
- Frequency: Quarterly
- Founded: 2013
- Final issue: 2018 (print)
- Company: Modern Farmer Media
- Country: United States
- Based in: Hudson, New York
- Language: English
- Website: modernfarmer.com
- ISSN: 2326-0807

Modern Farmer is a quarterly American magazine devoted to agriculture and food, founded in April 2013. The magazine is unique in that it attempts to have equally rural and urban readers, and to "appeal to the person who wants to romanticize farming and the person who is knee deep in turkey droppings", according to The New York Times. In 2014, the publication won the National Magazine Awards for the Magazine Section.

Modern Farmer covers feature livestock and its articles include those like a series of interviews with agriculture ministers from around the globe. Its stories tend to take a "farm to table" perspective, comprehensively covering food and agriculture topics like Greek yogurt or feral pigs. In addition to the print magazine, it has a popular website; its "goatcam", a public web cam of goats, produced 60,000 pageviews alone.

== History ==
Based in Hudson, New York, the magazine was backed financially by Fiore Capital and its founding CEO/editor-in-chief was Ann Marie Gardner; she was later replaced by Sarah Gray Miller. Gardner, a long-time magazine editor, came up with the idea for Modern Farmer when she tried developing a television show about a magazine editor covering a story about conflict between old and new farmers in Germantown, New York. After developing a set of stories for the fictional character, she decided to create a real magazine.

In early 2015, the magazine's founder and much of its editorial staff departed the publication, with print publication suspended. The paper's owner said in a statement that it planned to return for a summer issue in 2015. Despite fiscal difficulties, the magazine temporarily returned in 2015, in part due to Frank Giustra's continued support for the project. In 2018, the magazine went online-only.
