= Trinity Episcopal Day School =

School in Natchez, Mississippi, United States

Coordinates: 31.511267°N 91.374191°W

- Established: 1885
- Location: Natchez, Mississippi, United States
- Athletics: Saints
- Colors: Red, White & Black
- Website: www.trinitysaints.org

Trinity Episcopal Day School was a private school located in Natchez, Mississippi, United States, with students in preschool through twelfth grade. Trinity Episcopal was accredited by the Mississippi State Department of Education, the Mississippi Association of Independent Schools, and the Southern Association of Colleges and Schools. Athletic teams carried the nickname of Saints, and the school colors were red, white, and black.

Due to shrinking enrollment, Trinity closed in May 2018.

== History ==
In 1885, Trinity Episcopal Church in Natchez began a grammar school, which operated in the parish house but was dissolved a few years later. The parish started a nursery school in 1952. Magnolia Hall, an antebellum home in Natchez, was purchased in 1963 from Mrs. George Armstrong, and both nursery and kindergarten classes were taught starting in the fall of 1964. In 1965 first grade was added, and further expansion in 1966 yielded the addition of second through fifth grades. Growth continued the following two years, and in 1969 the congregation voted to expand the school. The high school building was erected at the present location south of Natchez on U.S. Highway 61, donated by Frederick Schurchardt. The building was designed and built by William Howard Pritchartt, Jr. In the fall semester of 1969, the school offered preschool through eighth grade in the new facility. Ninth and tenth grades were added in the spring semester of 1970, along with the construction of a new elementary school building.

Trinity Episcopal Day School graduated its first class in 1971.

Trinity Episcopal Day School was held by the Rev. Louis O'Vander Thomas Educational Foundation, a non-profit corporation.

At its height in the mid-1990s Trinity had more than 400 students. By 2017, that number was down to 140.

In May 2018, Trinity graduated its final class and closed permanently due to "dwindling local population, a depressed local economy and eroded support for the school among parents, friends and alumni."

== Athletics ==
Trinity Episcopal participated in Mississippi Association of Independent Schools Class 2A. The Saints won the MAIS championship in football in 1989, 2001, 2006, 2009, 2010, and 2013. The boys' basketball team won the MAIS championship in 1974, 1978, and 1980. The girls' basketball team won the MAIS championship in 1978. The Saints baseball team won their only MAIS championship in 2011.

The 1974 varsity basketball team went undefeated with a 36 and 0 record. In the Mississippi Basketball Overall Tournament, Trinity beat several much larger schools. The team was led by the legendary Coach Adams. For many years, Adams's teams worked as a "machine" on the court, since each player knew exactly where to be and, on defense especially, were in perfect position even though the Saints never had a big man. Players took high percentage shots and were tenacious on defense. In the '74 championship game, the sensational shooting guard Doug Lambdin (d. 1987) hit a shot from perhaps forty feet away. This team--most had played together for many years--could simply not be beat.

== Notable alumni ==
- Campbell Brown, CNN anchor, former NBC News anchor
- Dudley Guice, Jr., NFL wide receiver
- Greg Iles, bestselling novelist, who also was on the school board that led the school into disarray and closure
- Sarah Gray Miller, SAVEUR editor-in-chief; former Country Living, O at Home, In Style Magazine, and Budget Living editor
- Stevan Ridley, running back for the NFL Pittsburgh Steelers and New England Patriots
- Jonathan Scott, leader of the musical group Doleful Lions

== See also ==
- List of private schools in Mississippi
