= Stevan Ridley =

American football player (born 1989)

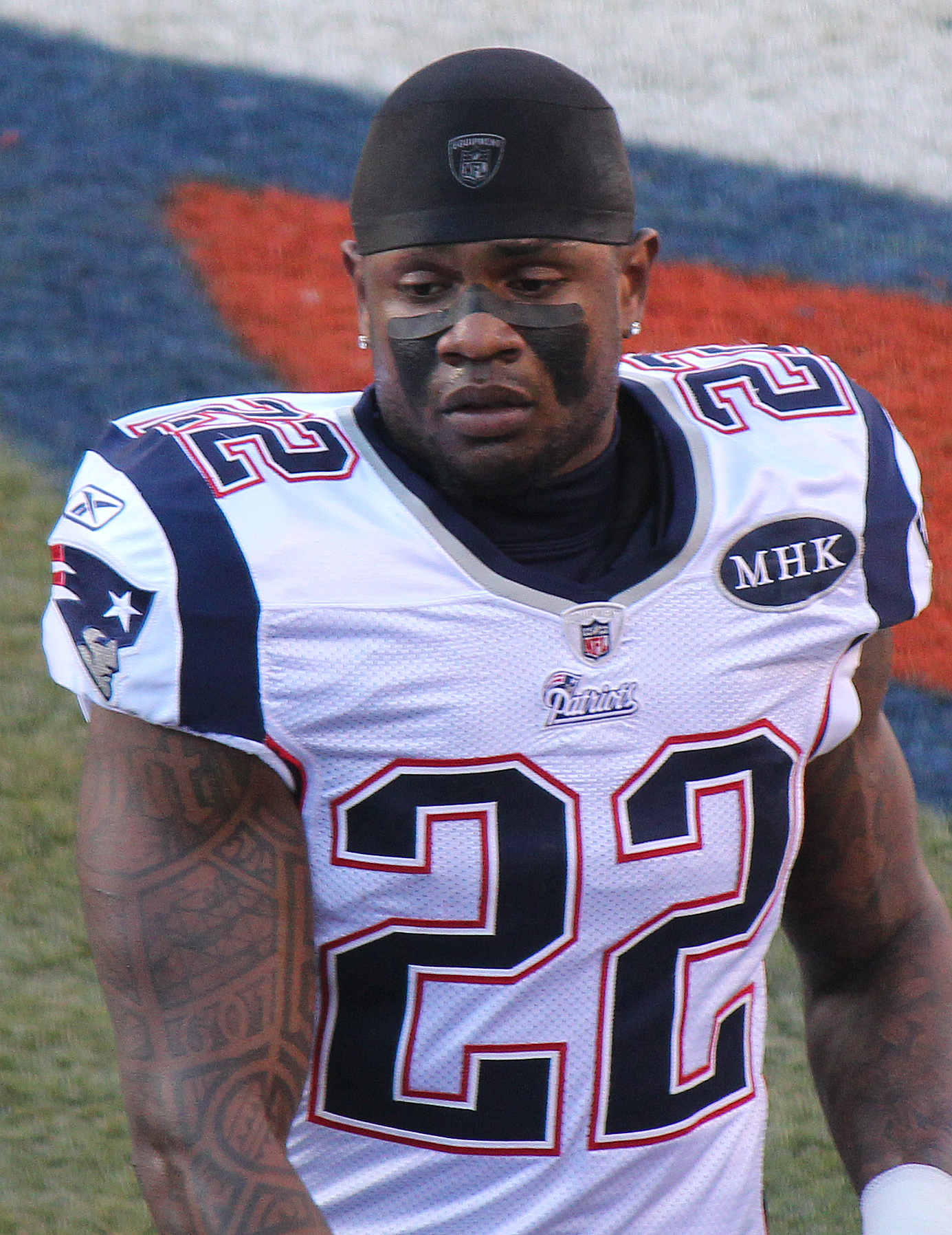
- Ridley with the New England Patriots in 2011

No. 22, 33, 38
- Position: Running back

Personal information
- Born: January 27, 1989 (age 37); Natchez, Mississippi, U.S.
- Listed height: 5 ft 11 in (1.80 m)
- Listed weight: 220 lb (100 kg)

Career information
- High school: Trinity Episcopal Day School (Natchez)
- College: LSU (2007–2010)
- NFL draft: 2011: 3rd round, 73rd overall pick

Career history
- New England Patriots (2011–2014); New York Jets (2015); Detroit Lions (2016)*; Indianapolis Colts (2016)*; Atlanta Falcons (2016); Denver Broncos (2017)*; Minnesota Vikings (2017); Pittsburgh Steelers (2017–2018)
- * Offseason or practice squad member only

Awards and highlights
- Super Bowl champion (XLIX); BCS national champion (2007); Second-team All-SEC (2010)

Career NFL statistics
- Rushing attempts: 743
- Rushing yards: 3,102
- Rushing touchdowns: 24
- Receptions: 30
- Receiving yards: 162
- Stats at Pro Football Reference

Stevan Todd Ridley (born January 27, 1989) is an American former professional football player who was a running back in the National Football League (NFL). He played college football for the LSU Tigers and was selected by the New England Patriots in the third round of the 2011 NFL draft. Ridley was also a member of the New York Jets, Detroit Lions, Indianapolis Colts, Atlanta Falcons, Denver Broncos, Minnesota Vikings and Pittsburgh Steelers. With the Patriots, he won Super Bowl XLIX.

== Early life ==
Ridley was born in Natchez, Mississippi. He attended Trinity Episcopal Day School in Natchez, where he played running back and linebacker for the Trinity Episcopal Saints high school football team. As a senior in 2006, he rushed for 3,086 yards and 38 touchdowns. He also competed in track, recording personal-bests of 11.25 seconds in the 100 meters and 23.42 seconds in the 200 meters.

== College career ==
While at LSU, Ridley played from 2008 to 2010. As a freshman, he rushed for 12 times for 92 yards and a rushing touchdown. As a sophomore, he rushed 45 times for 180 yards and three rushing touchdowns. He rushed 249 times for a career-high of 1,147 yards and 15 touchdowns in the 2010 season while also serving as permanent team captain.

== Professional career ==
Pre-draft measurables
Height	Weight	Arm length	Hand span	Wingspan	40-yard dash	10-yard split	20-yard split	20-yard shuttle	Three-cone drill	Vertical jump	Broad jump	Bench press
5 ft 11 1/4 in (1.81 m)	225 lb (102 kg)	31 7/8 in (0.81 m)	9 1/4 in (0.23 m)	6 ft 3 7/8 in (1.93 m)	4.66 s	1.66 s	2.65 s	4.17 s	6.78 s	36.0 in (0.91 m)	9 ft 10 in (3.00 m)	21 reps
All values from NFL Combine/Pro Day

=== New England Patriots ===
==== 2011 season ====
Ridley was selected in the third round of the 2011 NFL draft with the 73rd overall pick by the New England Patriots, a round after the Patriots drafted another running back, Shane Vereen, with the 56th overall pick.

Ridley scored his first NFL touchdown in Week 4 of his rookie season, in the Patriots' 31–19 win over the Oakland Raiders; he had 97 yards on 10 carries (for an average of 9.7 yards per carry), including a 33-yard touchdown run, and a three-yard reception. Overall, he finished his rookie season with 87 carries for 441 yards and a touchdown.

==== 2012 season ====
In the regular season opener, Ridley had his best game of his early career in a 34–13 win over the Tennessee Titans. He had 125 yards on 21 carries and a touchdown, and also grabbed three catches out of the backfield for 27 yards. In Week 5, he topped his Week 1 performance with 151 yards rushing, with one touchdown, against the Denver Broncos. In his second year, he proved to be a dependable running back in the NFL after racking up 1,263 total yards on 290 carries, while scoring 12 rushing touchdowns during the regular season. His 82 first down rushes ranked third in the league among all NFL running backs. During the AFC Championship against the Baltimore Ravens on January 20, 2013, Ridley suffered a concussion after a head-to-head collision with Bernard Pollard, which also resulted in a fumble and a turnover. The Patriots lost to the Ravens by a score of 13–28.

==== 2013 season ====
In the regular season opener, Ridley was benched in the second half of the game after losing a fumble. Ridley carried the ball nine times for 46 yards in the 23–21 win over the Buffalo Bills. After losing fumbles in three straight games, Ridley was a healthy scratch in the Patriots' Week 13 34–31 win over the Houston Texans. Plagued by the fumbling issues, Ridley lost significant playing time to LeGarrette Blount in his 2013 campaign, and finished the regular season with 178 carries for 773 yards with seven touchdowns. He also had 10 catches for 62 yards on the season, the most in his career. In the 2013–14 NFL playoffs, Ridley recorded his first career postseason multi-touchdown performance, rushing 14 times for 52 yards and two touchdowns in the Patriots' 43–22 Divisional Round win over the Indianapolis Colts.

==== 2014 season ====
Ridley had his longest rush (43 yards) in his career on October 5 against the Cincinnati Bengals. During a Week 6 37–22 win against the Buffalo Bills, Ridley tore his anterior cruciate ligament and medial collateral ligament, which ended his season. Overall, he finished the 2014 season with 94 carries for 340 rushing yards and two rushing touchdowns.

Despite being on injured reserve, Ridley was a part of the Patriots Super Bowl XLIX team that defeated the defending champion Seattle Seahawks 28–24.

=== New York Jets ===
Ridley was signed by the New York Jets on April 13, 2015. During the 2015 season, Ridley played in eight games for the Jets, including one start, after missing the first half of the season due to a knee injury. He finished the season with 36 carries for 90 yards.

=== Detroit Lions ===
On April 5, 2016, Ridley signed a one-year contract with the Detroit Lions. On August 25, 2016, Ridley was released by the Lions.

=== Indianapolis Colts ===
On August 28, 2016, Ridley signed with the Indianapolis Colts. He was released by the team one week later on September 3.

=== Atlanta Falcons ===
On October 25, 2016, Ridley was signed by the Atlanta Falcons. On November 3, he appeared in a game against the Tampa Bay Buccaneers and had three carries for seven yards. He was released by the team on November 23, 2016.

=== Denver Broncos ===
On July 27, 2017, Ridley was signed by the Denver Broncos. He was released on September 2, 2017.

=== Minnesota Vikings ===
On October 5, 2017, Ridley signed with the Minnesota Vikings after a season-ending injury to rookie Dalvin Cook. On October 9, 2017, he was released by the Vikings.

=== Pittsburgh Steelers ===
On December 19, 2017, Ridley signed with the Pittsburgh Steelers. He appeared in two games in the regular season for the Steelers and had 108 rushing yards and a rushing touchdown.

On April 4, 2018, Ridley re-signed with the Steelers. He totaled 29 carries for 80 rushing yards and a rushing touchdown in the 2018 season.

== Career statistics ==
=== NFL ===
Year	Team	Games		Rushing					Receiving					Fumbles	
Year	Team	GP	GS	Att	Yds	Avg	Lng	TD	Rec	Yds	Avg	Lng	TD	Fum	Lost
2011	NE	16	2	87	441	5.1	33T	1	3	13	4.3	8	0	1	0
2012	NE	16	12	290	1,263	4.4	41	12	6	51	8.5	20	0	4	2
2013	NE	14	6	178	773	4.3	29	7	10	62	6.2	24	0	4	4
2014	NE	6	5	94	340	3.6	43	2	4	20	5.0	7	0	0	0
2015	NYJ	8	1	36	90	2.5	13	0	4	−2	−0.5	3	0	0	0
2016	ATL	1	0	3	7	2.3	7	0	0	0	0	0	0	0	0
2017	PIT	2	1	26	108	4.2	21	1	0	0	0	0	0	0	0
2018	PIT	10	0	29	80	2.8	12	1	3	18	6.0	10	0	2	2
Career		73	27	743	3,102	4.2	43	24	30	162	5.4	24	0	11	8

=== College ===
Season	Team	Rushing				Receiving		
Season	Team	Att	Yds	Avg	TD	Rec	Yds	TD
2008	LSU	12	92	7.7	1	0	0	0
2009	LSU	45	180	4.0	3	6	33	0
2010	LSU	249	1,147	4.6	15	11	61	0
Career		306	1,419	4.6	19	17	94	0
