= Anthony McCoy =

American football player (born 1987)

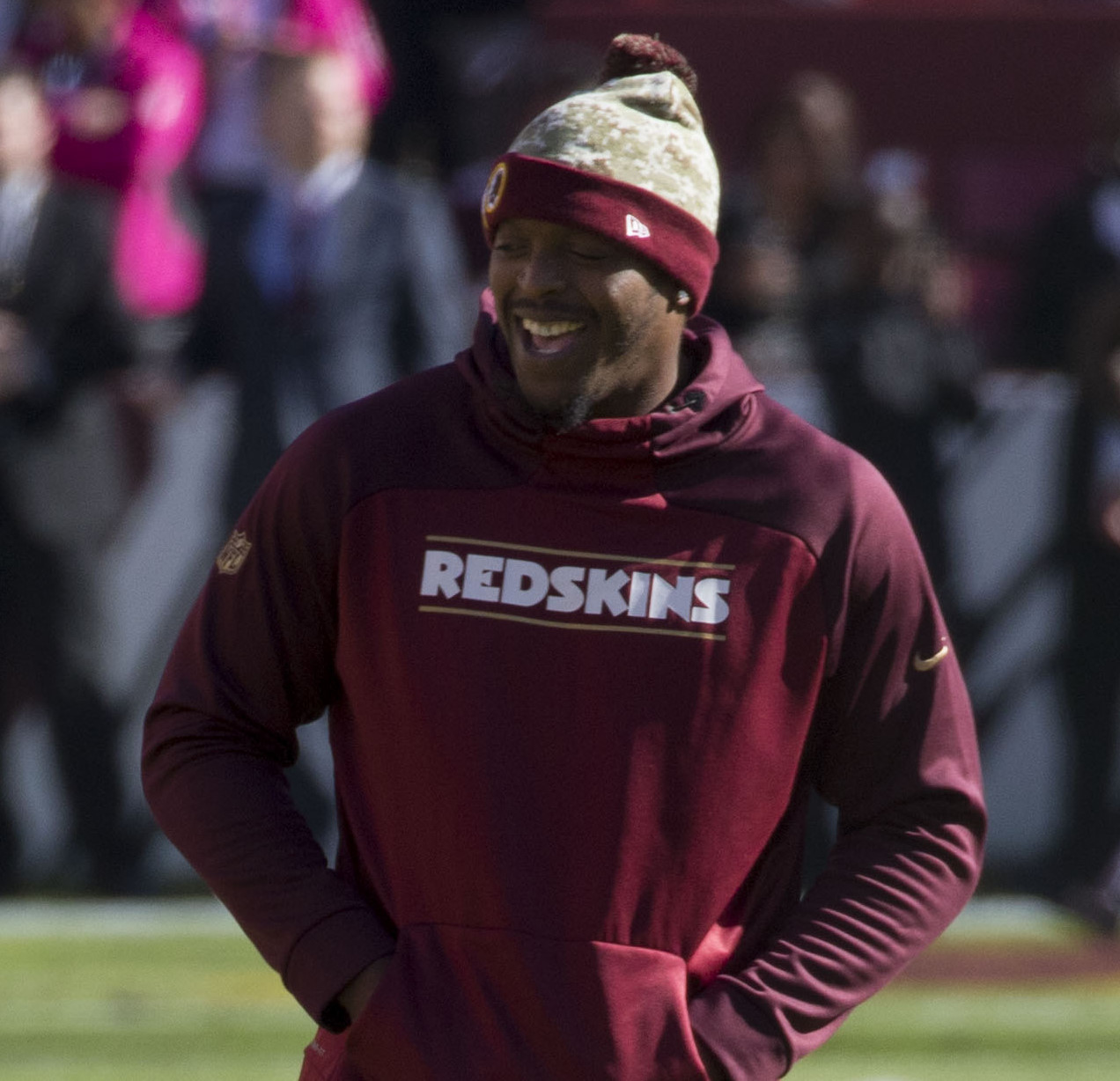
- McCoy with the Washington Redskins in 2015

No. 85
- Position: Tight end

Personal information
- Born: December 28, 1987 (age 38); Fresno, California, U.S.
- Listed height: 6 ft 5 in (1.96 m)
- Listed weight: 259 lb (117 kg)

Career information
- High school: Bullard (Fresno)
- College: USC
- NFL draft: 2010: 6th round, 185th overall pick

Career history
- Seattle Seahawks (2010–2014); Washington Redskins (2015); Seattle Seahawks (2015)

Awards and highlights
- Super Bowl champion (XLVIII)

Career NFL statistics
- Receptions: 31
- Receiving yards: 437
- Receiving average: 14.1
- Receiving touchdowns: 3
- Stats at Pro Football Reference

Robert Anthony McCoy (born December 28, 1987) is an American former professional football player who was a tight end in the National Football League (NFL). He played college football for the USC Trojans and was selected by the Seattle Seahawks in the sixth round of the 2010 NFL draft.

== Early life ==
McCoy attended Bullard High School in Fresno, California. As a senior, he had 70 receptions for 1,210 yards and 15 touchdowns as a tight end and wide receiver and 65 tackles and 14 sacks as defensive lineman.

== College career ==
As a freshman in 2006, McCoy played in only four games due to an injury and did not have a reception. As a sophomore in 2007 he played in all 13 games as a backup tight end and on special teams. He finished the season with two receptions for 18 yards and a touchdown. As a junior in 2008, McCoy started all 13 games at tight end, making 22 receptions for 256 yards and a touchdown.

During his senior year in 2009, McCoy started all 10 games for USC. He missed two games due to nagging injuries, and was named academically ineligible during the season finale against Boston College in the Emerald Bowl. McCoy finished the season with 22 catches for 457 yards and one touchdown. His most productive performance of his senior year came in the game against rival Notre Dame, catching 5 passes for 153 yards. McCoy left USC with 46 career catches, 731 career yards, and three career touchdowns.

== Professional career ==
Pre-draft measurables
Height	Weight	Arm length	Hand span	40-yard dash	10-yard split	20-yard split	20-yard shuttle	Three-cone drill	Vertical jump	Broad jump	Bench press
6 ft 4 1/2 in (1.94 m)	259 lb (117 kg)	34 in (0.86 m)	10 3/8 in (0.26 m)	4.78 s	1.67 s	2.81 s	4.57 s	6.99 s	35.5 in (0.90 m)	9 ft 5 in (2.87 m)	19 reps
All values from NFL Combine

=== Seattle Seahawks (first stint) ===
McCoy was considered one of the top tight end prospects for the 2010 NFL draft. He ended up being selected in the sixth round, 185th overall, by the Seattle Seahawks. The move reunited him with his college head coach from USC Pete Carroll who in 2010 took the head coaching job with Seattle.

On May 21, 2013, McCoy suffered a torn Achilles' during organized team activities, and underwent surgery three days later. His recovery was expected to take about six to nine months, prompting the Seahawks to waive him injured on May 28. After clearing waivers the following day, McCoy reverted to the reserve/injured list.

On July 29, 2014, McCoy suffered another torn Achilles' during training camp, his second in just over a year. The injury resulted in him missing the entire season and postseason.

On September 5, 2015, as part of the cutdown to a 53-man roster, the Seahawks terminated McCoy's contract.

=== Washington Redskins ===
McCoy signed with the Washington Redskins on September 7, 2015. He was waived on November 23, 2015.

=== Seattle Seahawks (second stint) ===
The Seahawks re-signed him on December 9, 2015.
