= Jordy Nelson =

American football player (born 1985)

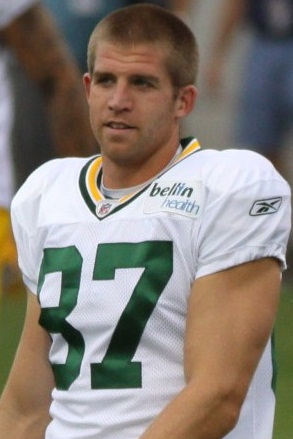
- Nelson with the Green Bay Packers in 2011

No. 87, 82
- Position: Wide receiver

Personal information
- Born: May 31, 1985 (age 41); Manhattan, Kansas, U.S.
- Listed height: 6 ft 3 in (1.91 m)
- Listed weight: 217 lb (98 kg)

Career information
- High school: Riley County (Riley, Kansas)
- College: Kansas State (2003–2007)
- NFL draft: 2008: 2nd round, 36th overall pick

Career history
- Green Bay Packers (2008–2017); Oakland Raiders (2018)

Awards and highlights
- Super Bowl champion (XLV); NFL Comeback Player of the Year (2016); Second-team All-Pro (2014); Pro Bowl (2014); NFL receiving touchdowns leader (2016); Green Bay Packers Hall of Fame; Consensus All-American (2007); First-team All-Big 12 (2007)

Career NFL statistics
- Receptions: 613
- Receiving yards: 8,587
- Receiving touchdowns: 72
- Return yards: 1,436
- Stats at Pro Football Reference

Jordy Ray Nelson (born May 31, 1985) is an American former professional football player who was a wide receiver in the National Football League (NFL) for 11 seasons, primarily with the Green Bay Packers. Nelson was raised in Riley County, Kansas and played college football for the Kansas State Wildcats, receiving consensus All-American honors in 2007. He was selected by the Packers in the second round of the 2008 NFL draft. In the 2010 season, he won Super Bowl XLV over the Pittsburgh Steelers, catching a touchdown pass in the game. Following his departure from the Packers in 2018, he played one year with the Oakland Raiders before announcing his retirement. In 2023, he was inducted into the Packers Hall of Fame. As of September 2025, Nelson holds the Packers franchise record for the most Lambeau Leaps performed by a player (27).

== Early life ==
Nelson was born in Manhattan, Kansas, to Alan and Kim Nelson, farmers who lived in Riley and had season tickets to Kansas State football games. The Nelson farm, established by his great-great-grandfather who immigrated from Sweden, has been in the family for four generations.

Nelson attended Riley County High School in Riley, Kansas, and played football for the Falcons. During his senior year playing quarterback, he completed 62 percent of his passes for 1,029 yards and eight touchdowns. Nelson also rushed for 1,572 yards, averaging 9.8 yards per carry with 25 touchdowns. He was named Flint Hills Player of the Year by the Manhattan Mercury. In 2003, he played in the Kansas Shrine Bowl. In addition to football, he was an all-state basketball player, averaging 17.2 points per game his senior year.

Nelson was an outstanding track and field athlete and won a national AAU championship in the 400 meters as a 10-year-old. In 2003, his senior year at Riley County High School, he won the state titles in Class 3A in the 100 meters, with a time of 10.63 seconds, which is currently the fastest 100m time in state history for class 3A; 200 meters, with a time of 21.64 seconds; 400 meters, with a time of 48.79; and long jump, with a leap of 7.00 meters. Nelson became the third player from Riley County High School to make the NFL, joining Jon McGraw and Homer Hanson.

== College career ==
Nelson attended Kansas State University, where he played for coach Bill Snyder's Wildcats football team from 2003 through 2005. When Snyder retired after the 2005 season, Nelson remained with Kansas State and played the rest of his college career (2006 and 2007) under Ron Prince.

=== 2003–2004 seasons ===
Nelson began his college career as a walk-on at Kansas State and took his redshirt year as a member of the Wildcats' 2003 Big 12 Championship team.

For 2004, Nelson was set to play defensive back, but during spring practice following his first year, Snyder moved him to the wide receiver position. He did not record any meaningful statistics in the Wildcats' 4–7 season in 2004.

=== 2005 season ===
In the Wildcats' season opener against FIU, Nelson had four receptions for 36 yards and caught his first career collegiate touchdown, an eight-yard pass from quarterback Allen Webb, in the fourth quarter of the 35–21 victory. Including the season opener, Nelson caught a touchdown in seven straight games that he appeared in. In that seven-game stretch, Nelson's best performance came against Oklahoma in a 43–21 loss where he had three receptions for 107 yards and a touchdown, which was a 73-yard reception from Webb. Kansas State struggled down the stretch of the season and did not make a bowl game with a 5–6 record. In the final game of the season, Nelson had seven receptions for 74 yards and a touchdown in a 36–28 victory over Missouri.

During his sophomore season, Nelson caught 45 passes for 669 yards and eight touchdowns. He led the team in all major receiving categories.

=== 2006 season ===
In his junior season, Nelson was listed on the Biletnikoff Award watchlist, which is an award for the most outstanding receiver in college football. Injuries kept him off the field most of his junior year, leading to a disappointing junior season.

Nelson did have some highlights in the 2006 season despite not getting to play as much. In the season opener against Illinois State, Nelson had four receptions for 62 yards in the narrow 24–23 victory. On November 4, against Colorado, Nelson turned in his best effort of the season with five receptions for 117 yards and a touchdown in the 34–21 victory. One week later, against the #4 Texas Longhorns, Nelson had a quiet day with only three receptions for 15 yards, but he threw a successful pass for 28 yards in the upset 45–42 victory. The Wildcats qualified for the Texas Bowl with a 7–5 record. In the 37–10 loss to #16 Rutgers, Nelson had four receptions for 81 receiving yards. Overall, Nelson finished the 2006 season with 39 receptions for 547 receiving yards and one receiving touchdown. He led the team in receptions and receiving yards.

=== 2007 season ===
After going unnoticed during his junior year, Nelson broke out during his senior year and was among the nation's best wide receivers. In the season opener against #18 Auburn, he had nine receptions for 90 yards. In addition, he threw a 21-yard touchdown pass to running back Leon Patton in the third quarter of the 23–13 loss. Two weeks later, against Missouri State, he had a great performance with 15 receptions for 209 yards and a touchdown in the 61–10 victory. For the second time in his senior season, he threw a touchdown pass, which was a 24-yard pass to wide receiver Deon Murphy. Two weeks later, against #7 Texas, Nelson had 12 receptions for 116 yards and a touchdown in the 41–21 victory. In addition, he had an 89-yard punt return touchdown. The next week, against Kansas, Nelson had another great outing with 10 receptions for 137 yards and a touchdown in the 30–24 loss. After the 47–20 victory over Colorado, Nelson put together a string of six consecutive games with a receiving touchdown to end the season. On October 20, against Oklahoma State, Nelson had 12 receptions for 176 yards and three touchdowns in the 41–39 loss. Against the Baylor Bears, Nelson had eight receptions for 105 yards and a touchdown. In addition, he had a 92-yard punt return touchdown in the 51–13 victory. Against Iowa State on November 3, Nelson had 14 receptions for 214 yards and touchdown in the 31–20 loss. In the following game against Nebraska, Nelson had nine receptions for 125 yards and a touchdown in the 73–31 loss. Against #6 Missouri the next week, he had eight receptions for 94 yards and a touchdown in the 49–32 loss. Against Fresno State, Nelson had 15 receptions for 165 yards and a touchdown in the 45–29 loss. The game against Fresno State was the last game of Nelson's college career as the loss knocked Kansas State out of bowl eligibility.

Nelson earned consensus All-American honors and was a finalist for the Biletnikoff Award after catching 122 passes for 1,606 yards and 11 touchdowns. Nelson also showed his versatility by throwing two touchdown passes and returning two punts for touchdowns. At the time his collegiate career ended, he was second in school history in receptions, receiving yards, and receiving touchdowns to Kevin Lockett in records going back to 1956.

== Professional career ==
Pre-draft measurables
Height	Weight	Arm length	Hand span	40-yard dash	10-yard split	20-yard split	20-yard shuttle	Three-cone drill	Vertical jump	Broad jump	Wonderlic
6 ft 2 5/8 in (1.90 m)	217 lb (98 kg)	32 1/2 in (0.83 m)	10 in (0.25 m)	4.51 s	1.50 s	2.59 s	4.35 s	7.03 s	31 in (0.79 m)	10 ft 3 in (3.12 m)	28
All values are from NFL Combine

=== Green Bay Packers ===
==== 2008 season ====
Nelson was selected in the second round with the 36th overall pick by the Green Bay Packers in the 2008 NFL draft. He was the third wide receiver taken in the draft, after Donnie Avery and Devin Thomas. In addition, he was one of two Kansas State Wildcats to be selected that year. He was the highest drafted wide receiver out of Kansas State since Quincy Morgan went 33rd overall in 2001.

On July 27, 2008, Nelson signed his rookie contract with the Packers.

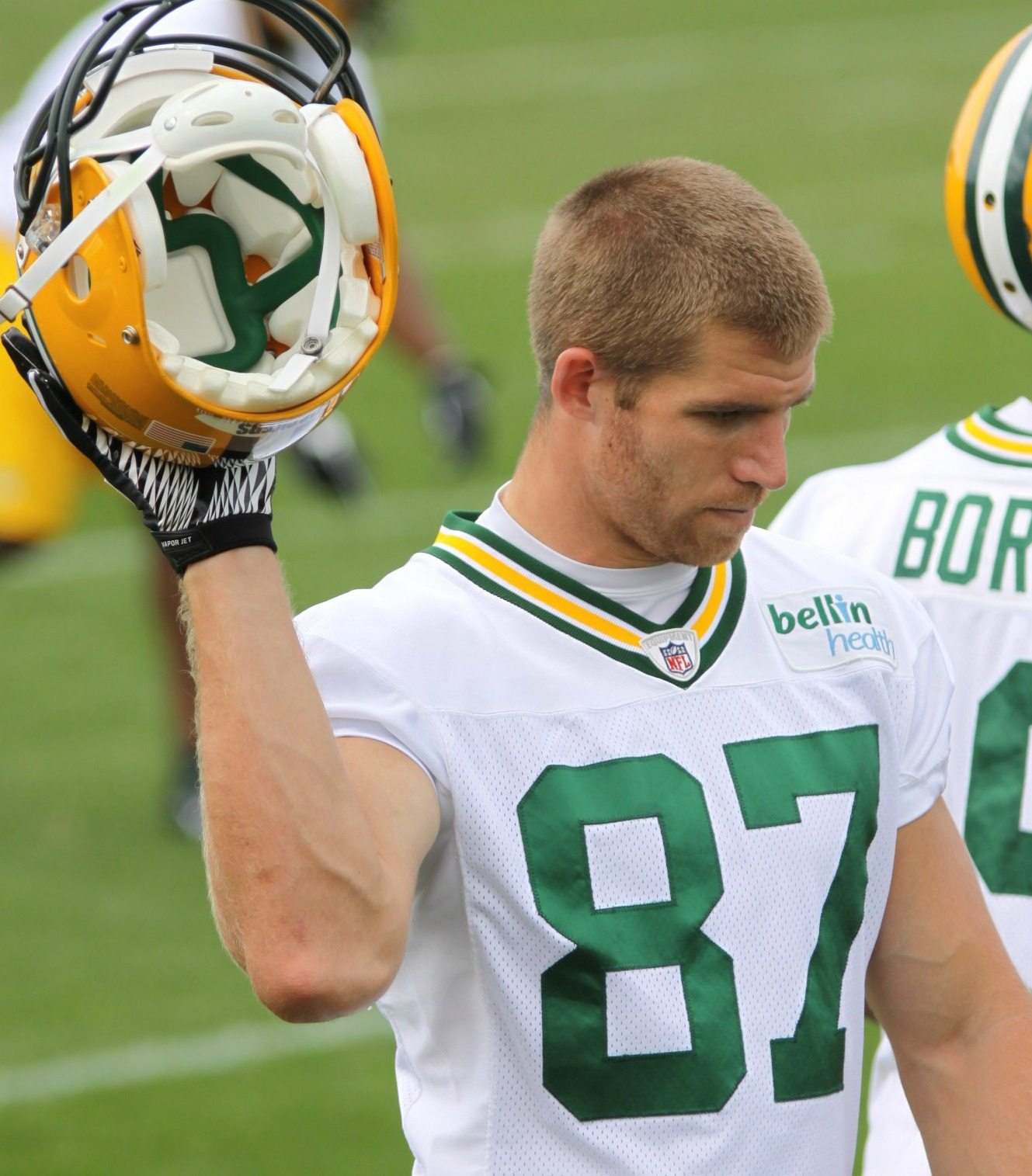
Jordy Nelson in August 2011

Nelson entered a wide receivers group that contained Donald Driver, Greg Jennings, and James Jones. He made his NFL debut in the Packers' season opener against the Minnesota Vikings. He was targeted once and had a 23-yard kickoff return in the 24–19 victory. He scored his first touchdown reception on September 14, 2008, in Week 2 against the Detroit Lions, a 29-yard pass from quarterback Aaron Rodgers. The touchdown was his lone reception in the 48–25 victory. Nelson was a steady presence for the Packers over the course of the season. From Week 3 to Week 13, he totaled 25 receptions for 267 receiving yards. Nelson recorded his second receiving touchdown, a nine-yard reception, in a Week 14 24–21 loss to the Houston Texans. The season was a struggle for Nelson and the Packers as they finished 6–10 and missed the playoffs. Nelson finished his rookie campaign with 33 receptions for 366 receiving yards and two touchdowns.

==== 2009 season ====
In the 2009 season, Nelson played in 13 games for the Packers, catching 22 passes for 320 receiving yards and two receiving touchdowns. In addition, he saw action as the primary kick returner along with Tramon Williams. Nelson recorded 25 kickoff returns for 635 net yards for a 25.40 average to go along with 17 punt returns for 90 net yards for a 5.29 average.

Nelson and the Packers finished 11–5 and made the playoffs as the fifth seed. The Packers fell to the Arizona Cardinals in the Wild Card Round by a score of 51–45. Nelson had one reception for 11 yards and a receiving touchdown to go along with four kickoff returns for 79 net yards in his playoff debut.

==== 2010 season: Super Bowl season ====
Nelson's role with the Packers expanded in the 2010 season. On November 28, in Week 12, Nelson had his first receiving touchdown of the season in the 20–17 loss to the Atlanta Falcons. Nelson's touchdown was a game-tying ten-yard reception with only 56 seconds remaining. On December 26, in Week 16, he had four receptions for 124 yards and a touchdown, which was an 80-yard reception, in the 45–17 victory over the New York Giants.

In the 2010 season, Nelson set career highs with 582 receiving yards and 45 catches, while catching two touchdown passes for the third straight year. Following the injury to Aaron Rodgers against the Detroit Lions on December 12, 2010, it was revealed that Nelson was third on the Packers' quarterback depth chart.

Nelson and the Packers made the playoffs as the sixth seed after a 10–6 regular season. Nelson had a quiet day with only one target against the Philadelphia Eagles in the 21–16 narrow victory in the Wild Card Round. He picked it up in the Divisional Round against the Atlanta Falcons with eight receptions for 79 yards and a touchdown in the 48–21 victory. In the NFC Championship, against their longtime rival Chicago Bears, he had four receptions for 61 yards in the resounding 21–14 victory over the NFC North champions. With the victory, he advanced to his first appearance in the Super Bowl.

Two weeks later, Nelson caught a 29-yard touchdown pass on third-and-1 with Steeler William Gay covering for the first score of Super Bowl XLV. "This was Jordy last week: 'I think we need to convert on third downs to win the game.' ... Rodgers threw a terrific pass, capping an 80-yard touchdown drive," a live-blog reported. He recovered from a drop early in the fourth quarter to catch a 38-yard pass on the next play, taking the Packers to the Steelers' two-yard line. Nelson was the top receiver of the game with nine receptions for 140 yards, which were both career highs. In addition, he gained 19 more yards on a kick return in the third quarter of the 31–25 victory. Nelson, with 140 receiving yards, broke Max McGee's long-standing franchise record of 138 in Super Bowl I for receiving yards in a single Super Bowl.

==== 2011 season ====
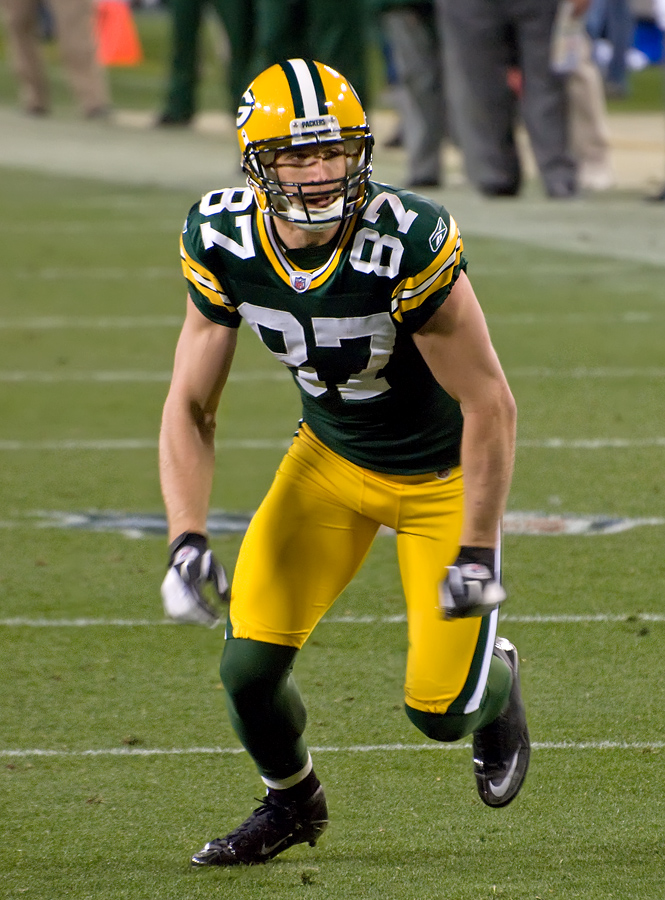
Jordy Nelson in November 2011

On September 18, he recorded an 84-yard touchdown reception for his only catch in the 30–23 victory over the Carolina Panthers in Week 2. Nelson signed a three-year, $13.35 million contract extension early into the season on October 2, 2011. On October 16, Nelson had two receptions for 104 yards, which included a 93-yard receiving touchdown, in the 24–3 victory over the St. Louis Rams in Week 6. On November 14, he had five receptions for 63 yards and two touchdowns in the 45–7 victory over the Minnesota Vikings in Week 10. Nelson continued his good stretch the next week on November 20, when he had six receptions for 123 yards and two touchdowns in the 35–26 victory over the Tampa Bay Buccaneers in Week 11. On Christmas Day, he had six receptions for 115 yards and two touchdowns in the 35–21 victory over the Chicago Bears in Week 16. In the regular season finale on January 1, 2012, he had nine receptions for 162 yards and set a new-career high with three receiving touchdowns in the 45–41 victory over the Detroit Lions.

Nelson finished the 2011 regular season with career highs in touchdowns (15), receptions (68), and receiving yards (1,263). He had a career-high 18.57 yards-per-reception, which finished fifth in the league that season. He moved into sole possession of third place for most receiving touchdowns in a single season in Packers franchise history, behind only Sterling Sharpe (18) and Don Hutson (17). He was named a Pro Bowl alternate.

The Packers went 15–1 in the 2011 regular season and earned the first seed in the NFC and a first round bye. However, Nelson and the Packers fell to the eventual Super Bowl XLVI champion New York Giants in the Divisional Round of the playoffs and ended their chance of a repeat championship. Nelson had three receptions for 39 receiving yards in the 37–20 loss. Nelson was ranked 80th by his fellow players on the NFL Top 100 Players of 2012.

==== 2012 season ====
On September 30, Nelson had eight receptions for 93 yards and a touchdown, which was the go-ahead score for the Packers in the fourth quarter, in the 28–27 victory over the New Orleans Saints in Week 4. On October 14, he had nine receptions for 121 yards and tied his career-high with three touchdowns in the 42–24 victory over the Houston Texans in Week 6. On October 21, he had eight receptions for 122 yards and a touchdown in the 30–20 victory over the St. Louis Rams in Week 7. On December 30, 2012, Nelson had three receptions for 87 yards and a touchdown in the 37–34 overtime loss the Minnesota Vikings in the regular season finale. He scored the tying touchdown late in the fourth quarter of the game.

In the 2012 season, Nelson played in 12 games, starting ten; he missed four games and most of another two games due to a hamstring injury. He had 49 receptions for 745 yards and scored seven touchdowns in the 2012 season.

Nelson and the Packers finished with an 11–5 record, won the NFC North and made the playoffs as the third seed. In the Wild Card Round, against the Minnesota Vikings, he had three receptions for 51 receiving yards in the 24–10 victory. In the Divisional Round, against the San Francisco 49ers, he had five receptions for 46 receiving yards in the 45–31 loss.

==== 2013 season ====
On September 8, 2013, Nelson started the season with seven receptions for 130 receiving yards and a receiving touchdown in the 34–28 loss to the San Francisco 49ers. The next week, he had three receptions for 66 yards and two touchdowns in the 38–20 victory over the Washington Redskins. On October 27, he had seven receptions for 123 yards and two touchdowns in the 44–31 victory over the Minnesota Vikings in Week . One of the touchdown receptions was a 76-yarder in the second quarter Nelson closed out his 2013 regular season on December 29, when he had 10 receptions for 161 yards in the 33–28 victory over the Chicago Bears, which ended up giving the Packers the NFC North title.

In the 2013 season, Nelson posted career highs with 85 receptions for 1,314 yards, for a 15.46 yards-per-catch average, and eight touchdowns. In the 2013 season, he started all 16 games for the first time in his career and was again named as a Pro Bowl alternate.

Nelson and the Packers finished with an 8–7–1 record and made the playoffs in the 2013 season. However, they fell to the San Francisco 49ers in the Wild Card round by a score of 23–20. He was ranked 83rd by his fellow players on the NFL Top 100 Players of 2014.

==== 2014 season ====
On July 26, 2014, Nelson signed a four-year extension worth $39 million, receiving an $11.5 million signing bonus toward a guaranteed $14.2 million.

In the season opener against the defending Super Bowl XLVIII champion Seattle Seahawks, Nelson had nine receptions for 83 yards in the 36–16 loss. During Week 2 against the New York Jets, Nelson recorded an 80-yard receiving touchdown in the third quarter. He ended up having nine receptions for a career-high 209 yards and a touchdown. It was his first career 200-yard receiving game as the Packers defeated the Jets, 31–24, despite having trailed 21–3. He became the first Packer since Javon Walker in 2004 to have 200 or more receiving yards in a single game. On September 28, he had ten receptions for 108 yards and two touchdowns in the 38–17 victory over the Chicago Bears. On October 2, he had a 66-yard touchdown reception in the 42–10 victory over the Minnesota Vikings. On November 9, he had six receptions for 152 yards and two touchdowns in another strong performance against the Chicago Bears, this time a 55–14 victory. On December 8, he had eight receptions for 146 yards and two touchdowns in the 43–37 victory over the Atlanta Falcons. On December 21, he caught all nine of his targets for 113 yards and a touchdown in the 20–3 victory over the Tampa Bay Buccaneers.

With a career-high 1,519 receiving yards on the season, Nelson passed Robert Brooks (1,497) to capture the franchise record for receiving yards in a season. His seven games with at least 100 receiving yards finished second to Brooks, who had nine games reaching the plateau in the 1995 season.

Nelson and Packers went 12–4 and made the playoffs in the 2014 season. As the second seed, they earned a first-round bye. In the Divisional Round against the Dallas Cowboys, he had a quiet day with two receptions for 22 yards but the team was able to advance in a 26–21 victory. In the NFC Championship, he had five receptions for 71 yards as the Packers fell to the defending Super Bowl champion Seattle Seahawks by a score of 28–22 in overtime. He was named to his first career Pro Bowl for the 2014 season. He was ranked 18th by his peers on the NFL Top 100 Players of 2015.

==== 2015 season: Lost season ====
In a Week 2 preseason game against the Pittsburgh Steelers at Heinz Field, Nelson caught an eight-yard pass from Aaron Rodgers, but then fell to the turf without contact. He limped to the sidelines with an apparent knee injury and did not return to the game. MRI scans deemed that Nelson had torn the ACL in his right knee. He remained inactive for the remainder of the 2015 season.

==== 2016 season ====
Nelson returned from his injury to start the 2016 season on time. In Week 3, he had six receptions for 101 yards and two receiving touchdowns in the 34–27 victory over the Detroit Lions. On November 13, he was targeted a career-high 18 times and had 12 receptions for 126 yards and a touchdown in the 47–25 loss to the Tennessee Titans. On December 4, he had eight receptions for 118 yards and a receiving touchdown in the 21–13 victory over the Houston Texans. On December 11, he had six receptions for 41 yards and two touchdowns in the 38–10 victory over the Seattle Seahawks. In Week 15, he caught a 60-yard pass from Rodgers to put the Packers in position to kick a field goal and win against the Bears 30–27. On Christmas Eve, he had nine receptions for 154 yards and two touchdowns in another strong performance in the 38–25 victory over the Minnesota Vikings. It was his 25th and final 100+ yard receiving game for the Packers, third only to James Lofton and Sterling Sharpe in franchise history.

Nelson and the Packers finished with a 10–6 record, won the NFC North and reached the playoffs as the fourth seed in the 2016 season. In the Wild Card round against the New York Giants, he had one reception for 13 yards in the 38–13 victory. Due to a rib injury sustained against the Giants, he did not play in the Divisional Round against the Dallas Cowboys, but the Packers won 34–31 and advanced. The next week, despite having broken ribs, Nelson returned and six receptions for 67 yards and a touchdown, but the team fell to the Atlanta Falcons by a score of 44–21 in the NFC Championship in the final NFL game at the Georgia Dome.

Nelson's successful return season had 97 receptions, 1,257 receiving yards, and 14 touchdowns in 2016. His 14 receiving touchdowns led the NFL for the 2016 season. He was named the NFL Comeback Player of the Year for the 2016 season after missing the entire 2015 season with the torn ACL. At the 2017 ESPY Awards won the award for Best Comeback Athlete. He became the sixth receiver in franchise history to record three consecutive seasons with at least 1,000 receiving yards. He finished the season in the top ten active players in touchdown and receiving yards. Nelson was ranked 48th by his peers on the NFL Top 100 Players of 2017.

==== 2017 season ====
On September 10, 2017, in the season opener against the Seattle Seahawks, Nelson caught the lone passing touchdown from Aaron Rodgers as part of a seven-reception, 79-yard performance in the 17–9 victory. Four of Nelson's receptions gave the Packers first downs in the close game. In Week 2, against the Atlanta Falcons, Nelson left with a minor injury early in the game, breaking a streak of 53 consecutive games with a reception dating back to Week 9 of 2012. The next week, against the Cincinnati Bengals, he caught two touchdowns to pass Sterling Sharpe for second in franchise history in the 27–24 overtime victory. Nelson's second touchdown in the game was a tying-score with only 17 seconds remaining to help force overtime. In Week 6 against the Minnesota Vikings, Aaron Rodgers was taken off the field by his coaches and medical personnel after suffering a shoulder injury on a hit from Anthony Barr. Shortly thereafter, it was revealed that Rodgers suffered a fractured right collarbone. Rodgers was forced to miss time, and Nelson's usual statistical volume dropped. Over the course of the rest of the season, his best game was four receptions for 35 receiving yards against the Detroit Lions in a 30–17 loss on November 6. He finished the season with 53 receptions for 482 yards and six touchdowns.

On March 13, 2018, Nelson was released by the Packers after ten seasons. During Nelson's time with the Packers, he and Aaron Rodgers combined for 43 redzone touchdowns, the most by any quarterback-wide receiver duo in that time period. He finished second in franchise history with 550 receptions and 69 receiving touchdowns, third with 25 games with at least 100 receiving yards, and fifth in receiving yards, with 7,848.

=== Oakland Raiders ===
On March 15, 2018, Nelson signed a two-year, $15 million contract with the Oakland Raiders. After recording 53 yards combined in his first two games with the Raiders, Nelson had six receptions for a season-high 173 receiving yards and a touchdown in a Week 3 28–20 loss to the Miami Dolphins. He scored receiving touchdowns in the next two games, a 19-yard reception in the 45–42 overtime victory over the Cleveland Browns and a one-yard reception in the 26–10 loss to the Los Angeles Chargers. After Amari Cooper was traded to the Dallas Cowboys, Nelson's role expanded in the offense. In his last five games of the season, Nelson totaled 38 receptions for 386 receiving yards to give him 739 receiving yards and three receiving touchdowns on the 2018 season. He finished second on the team in receiving yards and receiving touchdowns and third in receptions for the 2018 season.

On March 14, 2019, Nelson was released by the Raiders after one season.

=== Retirement ===
On March 27, 2019, Nelson announced his retirement from the NFL after 11 seasons. On August 4, 2019, he signed a one-day contract to retire as a Green Bay Packer. In 2022, Nelson was announced as one of the inductees into the Green Bay Packers Hall of Fame. Nelson was formally inducted on August 31, 2023.

As of 2024, Nelson works in the NFL office as one of four former players representing the National Football League Players Association, serving as an appeals hearing officer regarding fines and suspensions for on-field infractions.

== Career statistics ==
=== NFL ===
Legend
	Won the Super Bowl
	Led the league
**Bold**	Career high

==== Regular season ====
Year	Team	Games		Receiving					Fumbles	
Year	Team	GP	GS	Rec	Yds	Avg	Lng	TD	Fum	Lost
2008	GB	**16**	2	33	366	11.1	29	2	0	0
2009	GB	13	0	22	320	14.5	51	2	**3**	1
2010	GB	**16**	4	45	582	12.9	80	2	**3**	**3**
2011	GB	**16**	9	68	1,263	**18.6**	**93**	**15**	0	0
2012	GB	12	10	49	745	15.2	73	7	0	0
2013	GB	**16**	**16**	85	1,314	15.5	76	8	0	0
2014	GB	**16**	**16**	**98**	**1,519**	15.5	80	13	0	0
2015	GB	0	0	Did not play due to injury						
2016	GB	**16**	**16**	97	1,257	13.0	60	14	1	1
2017	GB	15	15	53	482	9.1	58	6	0	0
2018	OAK	15	14	63	739	11.7	66	3	1	0
Total		151	102	613	8,587	14.0	93	72	8	5

==== Postseason ====
Year	Team	Games		Receiving					Fumbles	
Year	Team	GP	GS	Rec	Yds	Avg	Lng	TD	Fum	Lost
2009	GB	1	0	1	11	11.0	11	1	1	0
2010	GB	4	3	21	286	13.6	38	2	0	0
2011	GB	1	0	3	39	13.0	17	0	0	0
2012	GB	2	0	8	97	12.1	23	0	0	0
2013	GB	1	1	7	62	8.9	19	1	0	0
2014	GB	2	2	7	93	13.3	23	0	0	0
2015	GB	0	0	Did not play due to injury						
2016	GB	2	2	7	80	11.4	27	1	0	0
Total		13	8	54	668	12.4	38	5	1	0

=== College ===
Season	Team	GP	Receiving		
Season	Team	GP	Rec	Yds	TD
2005	Kansas State	11	45	669	8
2006	Kansas State	13	39	547	1
2007	Kansas State	12	122	1,606	11
Career		36	206	2,822	20

== Career highlights ==
=== Awards and honors ===
NFL

- Super Bowl champion (XLV)
- NFL Comeback Player of the Year (2016)
- Second-team All-Pro (2014)
- Pro Bowl (2014)
- NFL receiving touchdowns leader (2016)
- Green Bay Packers Hall of Fame
- 4× NFL Top 100 — 80th (2012), 83rd (2014), 18th (2015), 48th (2017)

College

- Consensus All-American (2007)
- First-team All-Big 12 (2007)

=== Franchise records ===
- Most receptions in a playoff career: 54
- Most receptions in a playoff season: 21 (2010; tied with Greg Jennings)
- Most receptions in a playoff game: 9 (February 6, 2011, in Super Bowl XLV; tied with Edgar Bennett and Antonio Freeman)
- Most receiving yards in a Super Bowl: 140 (Super Bowl XLV)
- Most games with at least two receiving touchdowns (career): 15
- Most games with at least two receiving touchdowns (single season): 4 in the 2011 season (tied with Robert Brooks, Antonio Freeman, James Jones, and Sterling Sharpe)
- Most games with at least one receiving touchdown (single season): 11 in the 2016 season (tied with Sterling Sharpe and Davante Adams)

== Personal life ==
Nelson married his longtime girlfriend, Emily (née Rothlisberger), in 2007, after proposing during a family vacation to Cancun. Emily played basketball at Bethel College in Kansas. The couple have two sons, Royal (biological) and Brooks, who is adopted, and daughter, Adda Jo who is also adopted.

Nelson is a Christian and has spoken about his faith by saying, "Now, as a husband, father and, most importantly, as a Christian, I can see the Super Bowl Champion label with a greater perspective. I know it's an opportunity to share the most important truth of life: the gospel of the Lord and Savior, Jesus Christ."

On August 20, 2015, Nelson's alma mater, Kansas State, renamed their football team's locker room after him when Nelson donated an undisclosed amount to renovate their athletic facilities.

After the end of an NFL season, Nelson would return to his family farm in Riley, Kansas. Though he would be paid over $56 million as a player, Nelson put in up to 12 hours a day of heavy farm work including driving a wheat-cutting combine and rounding up the family's 1,000-cattle herd. Nelson said that he identifies more as a farmer than as a football player. His parents were local restaurant owners in Leonardville, Kansas. His parents' restaurant, Nelson's Landing, permanently closed in 2020 after 13 years in operation, citing the COVID-19 pandemic as a cause.

On December 13, 2019, Nelson was named as a 2020 inductee for the Wisconsin Sports Hall of Fame. In 2020, he was named to the Kansas Sports Hall of Fame. In 2021, he was named to the Kansas State Hall of Fame.

Nelson is a supporter of Compassion International and their "Fill the Stadium" initiative. In 2021, Nelson helped raised money for SHARP Literacy, a program designed to improve reading among children.

In 2024, Nelson became an appeals officer for the NFL.
