= 2010–11 NFL playoffs =

American football tournament

- Dates: January 8–February 6, 2011
- Season: 2010
- Teams: 12
- Games played: 11
- Super Bowl XLV site: Cowboys Stadium; Arlington, Texas
- Defending champions: New Orleans Saints
- Champion: Green Bay Packers (13th title)
- Runner-up: Pittsburgh Steelers
- Conference runners-up: Chicago Bears; New York Jets
NFL playoffs
← 2009–10	2011–12 →

The National Football League playoffs for the 2010 season began on January 8, 2011. The postseason tournament concluded with the Green Bay Packers defeating the Pittsburgh Steelers in Super Bowl XLV, 31–25, on February 6, at Cowboys Stadium in Arlington, Texas. This was the first Super Bowl in which the NFC representative was a #6 seed, and only the second time one has made the Super Bowl (the previous being the 2005 Pittsburgh Steelers in Super Bowl XL).

This was only the second postseason in NFL history that included a team with a losing record, and the first to occur with a full regular season. The Seattle Seahawks won their division with a 7–9 record, as all four teams in the NFC West had losing seasons in 2010. Only the 1982–83 NFL playoffs, following the strike-shortened 1982 season, had previously included teams with losing records (under a modified 16-team tournament, with eight from each conference, the 1982 Cleveland Browns and Detroit Lions qualified with records of 4–5). Six days after winning the division, the Seahawks defeated the defending Super Bowl champion New Orleans Saints to become the first playoff team with a losing record to win in the postseason.

In the opening wildcard round of the playoffs, three of the four home teams had fewer wins than the away team. The exception was the Green Bay Packers–Philadelphia Eagles matchup, where both were 10–6 (the Packers had defeated the Eagles in Week 1 of the season but were on the road because they were the wild card team). Away teams finished 6–4 in the 2010 postseason. This was the second time since the 1979 NFL season where neither of the number one playoff seeds advanced to their conference's respective championship game, the other time being in the 2008–09 NFL playoffs. Also, had the New York Jets won their conference championship game, it would have been the first Super Bowl between two #6 seeds, let alone two wild card teams.

Unless otherwise noted, all times listed are Eastern Standard Time (UTC−05)

== New overtime rules ==
This was the first time that the new postseason overtime rules were in effect, although none of the playoff games this season ended up going into the extra period. Under these new changes, instead of a straight sudden death, the game will not immediately end if the team that wins the coin toss only scores a field goal on its first possession (the game will end if they score a touchdown). Instead, the other team gets a possession. If the coin toss loser then scores a touchdown, it is declared the winner. If the score is tied after both teams had a possession, then it goes back to sudden death.

== Participants ==
Within each conference, the four division winners and the top two non-division winners with the best overall regular season records) qualified for the playoffs. The four division winners are seeded 1–4 based on their overall won-lost-tied record, and the wild card teams are seeded 5–6. The NFL does not use a fixed bracket playoff system, and there are no restrictions regarding teams from the same division matching up in any round. In the first round, dubbed the wild-card playoffs or wild-card weekend, the third-seeded division winner hosts the sixth-seed wild card, and the fourth seed hosts the fifth. The 1 and 2 seeds from each conference received a first-round bye. In the second round, the divisional playoffs, the number 1 seed hosts the worst-surviving seed from the first round (seed 4, 5, or 6), while the number 2 seed will play the other team (seed 3, 4, or 5). The two surviving teams from each conference's divisional playoff games met in the respective AFC and NFC Conference Championship games, hosted by the higher seed. Although the Super Bowl, the championship round of the playoffs, is played at a neutral site, the designated home team is based on an annual rotation by conference.

Playoff seeds
Seed	AFC	NFC
1	New England Patriots (East winner)	Atlanta Falcons (South winner)
2	Pittsburgh Steelers (North winner)	Chicago Bears (North winner)
3	Indianapolis Colts (South winner)	Philadelphia Eagles (East winner)
4	Kansas City Chiefs (West winner)	Seattle Seahawks (West winner)
5	Baltimore Ravens (wild card)	New Orleans Saints (wild card)
6	New York Jets (wild card)	Green Bay Packers (wild card)

== Bracket ==
Jan 8 – Lucas Oil Stadium	Jan 16 – Gillette Stadium
6	NY Jets	17
6	NY Jets	28
3	Indianapolis	16	Jan 23 – Heinz Field
1	New England	21
AFC
Jan 9 – Arrowhead Stadium	6	NY Jets	19
Jan 15 – Heinz Field
2	Pittsburgh	24
5	Baltimore	30	AFC Championship
5	Baltimore	24
4	Kansas City	7	Feb 6 – Cowboys Stadium
2	Pittsburgh	31
Wild Card playoffs
Divisional playoffs
Jan 9 – Lincoln Financial Field	A2	Pittsburgh	25
Jan 15 – Georgia Dome
N6	Green Bay	31
6	Green Bay	21	Super Bowl XLV
6	Green Bay	48
3	Philadelphia	16	Jan 23 – Soldier Field
1	Atlanta	21
NFC
Jan 8 – Qwest Field	6	Green Bay	21
Jan 16 – Soldier Field
2	Chicago	14
5	New Orleans	36	NFC Championship
4	Seattle	24
4	Seattle	41
2	Chicago	35

== Schedule ==
In the United States, NBC broadcast the first two Wild Card playoff games, then CBS broadcast the rest of the AFC playoff games. Fox televised the rest of the NFC games and Super Bowl XLV.

Round	Away team	Score	Home team	Date	Kickoff (ET / UTC−5)	TV
Wild-card round	New Orleans Saints	36–41	Seattle Seahawks	January 8, 2011	4:30 p.m.	NBC
Wild-card round	New York Jets	17–16	Indianapolis Colts	January 8, 2011	8:00 p.m.	NBC
Wild-card round	Baltimore Ravens	30–7	Kansas City Chiefs	January 9, 2011	1:00 p.m.	CBS
Wild-card round	Green Bay Packers	21–16	Philadelphia Eagles	January 9, 2011	4:30 p.m.	Fox
Divisional round	Baltimore Ravens	24–31	Pittsburgh Steelers	January 15, 2011	4:30 p.m.	CBS
Divisional round	Green Bay Packers	48–21	Atlanta Falcons	January 15, 2011	8:00 p.m.	Fox
Divisional round	Seattle Seahawks	24–35	Chicago Bears	January 16, 2011	1:00 p.m.	Fox
Divisional round	New York Jets	28–21	New England Patriots	January 16, 2011	4:30 p.m.	CBS
Conference championships	Green Bay Packers	21–14	Chicago Bears	January 23, 2011	3:00 p.m.	Fox
Conference championships	New York Jets	19–24	Pittsburgh Steelers	January 23, 2011	6:30 p.m.	CBS
Super Bowl XLV Cowboys Stadium Arlington, Texas	Pittsburgh Steelers	25–31	Green Bay Packers	February 6, 2011	6:30 p.m.	Fox

== Wild-card round ==
=== Saturday, January 8, 2011 ===
==== NFC: Seattle Seahawks 41, New Orleans Saints 36 ====
New Orleans Saints vs. Seattle Seahawks – Game summary

Quarter	1	2	3	4	Total
Saints	10	10	0	16	36
Seahawks	7	17	10	7	41

at Qwest Field, Seattle

- Date: January 8
- Game time: 4:30 p.m. EST/1:30 p.m. PST
- Game weather: 40 °F (4 °C), cloudy
- Game attendance: 66,336
- Referee: Walt Coleman
- TV announcers (NBC): Tom Hammond (play-by-play), Mike Mayock (color commentator), and Alex Flanagan (sideline reporter)
- Recap, Game book

Game information

First quarter

- NO – Garrett Hartley 26-yard field goal, 11:43. Saints 3–0. Drive: 8 plays, 52 yards, 3:17.
- NO – Heath Evans 1-yard pass from Drew Brees (Garrett Hartley kick), 6:21. Saints 10–0. Drive: 8 plays, 35 yards, 4:11.
- SEA – John Carlson 11-yard pass from Matt Hasselbeck (Olindo Mare kick), 3:38. Saints 10–7. Drive: 6 plays, 57 yards, 2:43.

Second quarter

- NO – Julius Jones 5-yard run (Garrett Hartley kick), 13:38. Saints 17–7. Drive: 10 plays, 83 yards, 5:00.
- SEA – John Carlson 7-yard pass from Matt Hasselbeck (Olindo Mare kick), 11:00. Saints 17–14. Drive: 5 plays, 70 yards, 2:38.
- SEA – Olindo Mare 29-yard field goal, 7:03. Tied 17–17. Drive: 4 plays, 8 yards, 1:47.
- SEA – Brandon Stokley 45-yard pass from Matt Hasselbeck (Olindo Mare kick), 1:15. Seahawks 24–17. Drive: 9 plays, 76 yards, 3:48.
- NO – Garrett Hartley 22-yard field goal, 0:00. Seahawks 24–20. Drive: 11 plays, 77 yards, 1:15.

Third quarter

- SEA – Mike Williams 38-yard pass from Matt Hasselbeck (Olindo Mare kick), 11:48. Seahawks 31–20. Drive: 7 plays, 79 yards, 3:12.
- SEA – Olindo Mare 39-yard field goal, 5:27. Seahawks 34–20. Drive: 9 plays, 33 yards, 4:12.

Fourth quarter

- NO – Julius Jones 4-yard run (Garrett Hartley kick), 13:11. Seahawks 34–27. Drive: 12 plays, 87 yards, 4:41.
- NO – Garrett Hartley 21-yard field goal, 9:13. Seahawks 34–30. Drive: 8 plays, 53 yards, 3:27.
- SEA – Marshawn Lynch 67-yard run (Olindo Mare kick), 3:22. Seahawks 41–30. Drive: 2 plays, 67 yards, 0:58.
- NO – Devery Henderson 6-yard pass from Drew Brees (run failed), 1:30. Seahawks 41–36. Drive: 9 plays, 70 yards, 1:52.

Top passers

- NO – Drew Brees – 39/60, 404 yards, 2 TD
- SEA – Matt Hasselbeck – 22/35, 272 yards, 4 TD, INT

Top rushers

- NO – Julius Jones – 15 rushes, 59 yards, 2 TD
- SEA – Marshawn Lynch – 19 rushes, 131 yards, TD

Top receivers

- NO – Devery Henderson – 7 receptions, 77 yards, TD
- SEA – Brandon Stokley – 4 receptions, 73 yards, TD

The Seahawks made history by becoming the first 7–9 team ever to make the playoffs and then did it again by becoming the first to win a playoff game, racking up 31 first downs and 474 yards, including a 67-yard touchdown run by Marshawn Lynch late in the fourth quarter. This marked the fifth consecutive year a Super Bowl champion failed to win a playoff game in the next season.

Two early Seahawk miscues enabled the Saints to build a 10-point lead. First Olindo Mare kicked the opening kickoff out of bounds, giving New Orleans the ball at their 40-yard line. New Orleans then drove to the Seahawks' 8-yard line, but had to settle for a Garrett Hartley field goal after Reggie Bush dropped a pass on third down that could have kept the drive going. Then three plays into the Seahawks' drive, Matt Hasselbeck's pass went through the hands of receiver Ben Obomanu and into the arms of Jabari Greer, who returned the interception 10 yards to the Seattle 35. New Orleans subsequently drove 35 yards in nine plays, aided by a third down pass interference penalty on Walter Thurmond in the end zone, and scored with Drew Brees' 1-yard touchdown pass to fullback Heath Evans, giving them a 10–0 lead.

Seattle fullback Michael Robinson returned Hartley's short kickoff 18 yards to the 43-yard line, and the Seahawks struck back with a 57-yard drive that ended with Hasselbeck's 11-yard touchdown pass to tight end John Carlson. The Saints countered as Brees completed four of five passes for 53 yards on an 83-yard drive that ended with a 5-yard touchdown run by Julius Jones, who had been cut by Seattle early in the season, to again give the Saints a 10-point lead. But Hasselbeck led the Seahawks right back on a 70-yard scoring drive, featuring a 39-yard reception by tight end Cameron Morrah. On the next play, Hasselbeck threw his second touchdown pass to Carlson, cutting the score to 17–14. After an exchange of punts, Jones lost a fumble while being tackled by Raheem Brock that Seattle linebacker David Hawthorne recovered on the Saints' 18-yard line, setting up a 29-yard field goal by Mare to tie the game.

With 1:15 left in the second quarter, Hasselbeck launched a 45-yard touchdown pass to Brandon Stokley, giving Seattle their first lead of the game at 24–17. But a 40-yard reception by Devery Henderson helped the Saints drive to the Seattle 3-yard line where Hartley made his second field goal to cut the score to 24–20 as time expired in the half. This was only the second playoff game in which both teams scored at least 20 points in the first two quarters.

The Seahawks increased their lead to 31–20 on their opening drive of the second half, as Hasselbeck threw an 18-yard completion to Obomanu and finished the drive with a 38-yard touchdown pass to Mike Williams. Then after forcing a punt, Mare kicked a 39-yard field goal to make the score 34–20 with 9:54 left in the quarter. The Seahawks got a chance to build a three-score lead after stopping Jones for no gain on fourth down and 1 on the Saints' 37-yard line, but they could only gain a few yards with their next drive, and a delay of game penalty on fourth down pushed them out of field goal range.

New Orleans got the ball back at their 13-yard line following Jon Ryan's punt, and mounted an 83-yard drive that ended with Jones' second touchdown run of the game, making the score 34–27 with 13:11 left in regulation. Then they forced a three-and-out and got the ball back with good field position on their 44-yard line with Lance Moore's 8-yard punt return. On the second play of their ensuing drive, Brees threw a short pass to Jones, who took it 33 yards to the Seattle 23. But several plays later, Seattle's defense halted the drive at the 3-yard line, where the Saints settled for Hartley's third field goal to cut the score to 34–30.

After an exchange of punts, Seattle got the ball with 4:20 left in the game. On the first play of the drive, Lynch was stuffed for no gain. But on the next play, he took off for a 67-yard touchdown run in which he broke seven tackles en route to the end zone. The crowd in Seattle was so loud during the run that local seismographs recorded it as a small earthquake. This play has become colloquially known as the Beast Quake. With 1:52 left, Brees struck back with a 6-yard touchdown pass to Henderson, but the two-point conversion failed, keeping the score at 41–36. Then Carlson sealed the victory by recovering Hartley's onside kick attempt, enabling Seattle to run out the clock.

Brees completed 39 of 60 passes for 404 yards and two touchdowns. His 39 completions set a postseason record. Jones, who became the first player ever to score a touchdown in the postseason against a team that had cut him in the regular season, rushed for 59 yards and two touchdowns while also catching six passes for 61 yards. Hasselbeck completed 22 of 35 passes for 271 yards and four touchdowns with an interception. Lynch added 131 rushing yards and a touchdown for Seattle, who had not had a 100-yard rusher in any of their regular season games.

This was the first postseason meeting between the Saints and Seahawks.

==== AFC: New York Jets 17, Indianapolis Colts 16 ====
New York Jets vs. Indianapolis Colts – Game summary

Quarter	1	2	3	4	Total
Jets	0	0	7	10	17
Colts	0	7	3	6	16

at Lucas Oil Stadium, Indianapolis

- Date: January 8
- Game time: 8:00 p.m. EST
- Game weather: Played with roof closed, retractable roof stadium
- Game attendance: 65,332
- Referee: Gene Steratore
- TV announcers (NBC): Al Michaels (play-by-play), Cris Collinsworth (color commentator), and Andrea Kremer (sideline reporter)
- Recap, Game book

Game information

First quarter

- No scoring plays.

Second quarter

- IND – Pierre Garçon 57-yard pass from Peyton Manning (Adam Vinatieri kick), 5:25. Colts 7–0. Drive: 5 plays, 80 yards, 2:44.

Third quarter

- NYJ – LaDainian Tomlinson 1-yard run (Nick Folk kick), 9:48. Tied 7–7. Drive: 10 plays, 63 yards, 5:12.
- IND – Adam Vinatieri 47-yard field goal, 4:53. Colts 10–7. Drive: 9 plays, 45 yards, 4:55.

Fourth quarter

- NYJ – LaDainian Tomlinson 1-yard run (Nick Folk kick), 9:59. Jets 14–10. Drive: 17 plays, 87 yards, 9:54.
- IND – Adam Vinatieri 32-yard field goal, 4:37. Jets 14–13. Drive: 13 plays, 67 yards, 5:22.
- IND – Adam Vinatieri 50-yard field goal, 0:53. Colts 16–14. Drive: 8 plays, 48 yards, 1:43.
- NYJ – Nick Folk 32-yard field goal, 0:00. Jets 17–16. Drive: 5 plays, 40 yards, 0:53.

Top passers

- NYJ – Mark Sanchez – 18/31, 189 yards
- IND – Peyton Manning – 18/26, 225 yards, TD

Top rushers

- NYJ – LaDainian Tomlinson – 16 rushes, 82 yards, 2 TD
- IND – Joseph Addai – 13 rushes, 60 yards

Top receivers

- NYJ – Braylon Edwards – 4 receptions, 62 yards
- IND – Pierre Garçon – 5 receptions, 112 yards, TD

As he had done several times before, Colts kicker Adam Vinatieri gave his team a fourth quarter lead with less than a minute remaining by making a clutch field goal. But this time it was not enough, as New York managed to avenge their previous season loss to Indianapolis in the AFC title game by winning on a Nick Folk field goal as time expired in the game.

The first quarter was scoreless as every drive by both teams ended with a punt. The game remained scoreless until just over five minutes remained in the half, when Colts quarterback Peyton Manning (playing in what would be his final game in a Colts uniform, as Manning would miss the entire 2011 season because of back surgery) threw a 57-yard touchdown pass to Pierre Garçon. New York responded with a long drive to the Colts' 19-yard line, but with less than a minute left, Justin Tryon intercepted a pass from Mark Sanchez in the end zone to keep them scoreless going into halftime.

New York managed to tie the game on their opening drive of the second half, starting with Antonio Cromartie's 41-yard kickoff return to the 37-yard line. The Jets subsequently drove 63 yards in 10 plays, featuring a 20-yard reception by tight end Dustin Keller, on the way to a 1-yard touchdown run by LaDainian Tomlinson. Indianapolis countered with a 9-play drive to the New York 29-yard line, with Manning completing a 23-yard pass to Blair White and Joseph Addai rushing for 14 yards. Vinatieri finished the drive with a 47-yard field goal to give them a three-point lead. But the Jets responded with a 17-play, 87-yard drive that consumed almost 10 minutes and featured three third down conversions. Tomlinson capped off the drive with his second 1-yard touchdown run to make the score 14–10.

With 5:22 left in the game, Vinatieri's 32-yard field goal cut the Colts' deficit to one point. Indianapolis' defense subsequently forced a punt after three plays, but a running into the punter penalty against them kept the drive going, allowing New York to take more time off the clock and forcing the Colts to use two timeouts. Indianapolis got the ball back with 2:36 left in the game, and retook the lead with a 48-yard drive as Manning completed two passes to tight end Jacob Tamme for gains of 15 and 11 yards, along with a 12-yard completion to White. At the end of the drive, Vinatieri made a 50-yard field goal to give the Colts a two-point lead with 53 seconds left in regulation.

However, the Jets stormed back to drive for the winning score, as Cromartie returned the ensuing kickoff 47 yards to the 46-yard line. After that, Sanchez completed passes to Braylon Edwards and Santonio Holmes for gains of nine and 11 yards. Then after a 2-yard run by Tomlinson, he completed an 18-yard pass to Edwards, who made a leaping catch near the sidelines and managed to keep both feet in bounds at the Colts' 14-yard line with 29 seconds left on the clock. After letting the clock run down to three seconds, New York called their final timeout and sent Folk out to kick a 32-yard field goal, which sailed through the uprights as time expired to win the game for the Jets.

Manning finished 18 of 26 for 221 yards and a touchdown. His top target was Garçon, who caught five passes for 112 yards and a touchdown. Reggie Wayne, the Colts' leading receiver in the regular season, was completely shut down while being covered by Darrelle Revis, held to just one reception for one yard. Tomlinson rushed for 82 yards and two touchdowns while also catching four passes for 17 yards, while running back Shonn Greene added another 70 yards on the ground.

This turned out to be the last game Manning would play in a Colts uniform, as he missed the entire 2011 season with a neck injury and signed with the Denver Broncos on March 20, 2012.

This was the fourth postseason meeting between the Jets and Colts, with New York previously winning two of the three meetings. This was also a rematch of the 2009 AFC Championship Game, which was won by Indianapolis 30–17.

=== Sunday, January 9, 2011 ===
==== AFC: Baltimore Ravens 30, Kansas City Chiefs 7 ====
Baltimore Ravens vs. Kansas City Chiefs – Game summary

Quarter	1	2	3	4	Total
Ravens	3	7	13	7	30
Chiefs	7	0	0	0	7

at Arrowhead Stadium, Kansas City, Missouri

- Date: January 9
- Game time: 1:00 p.m. EST/12:00 p.m. CST
- Game weather: 26 °F (−3 °C), cloudy
- Game attendance: 72,190
- Referee: Mike Carey
- TV announcers (CBS): Jim Nantz (play-by-play) and Phil Simms (color commentator)
- Recap, Game book

Game information

First quarter

- BAL – Billy Cundiff 19-yard field goal, 9:01. Ravens 3–0. Drive: 14 plays, 69 yards, 5:59.
- KC – Jamaal Charles 41-yard run (Ryan Succop kick), 2:09. Chiefs 7–3. Drive: 2 plays, 46 yards, 0:49.

Second quarter

- BAL – Ray Rice 9-yard pass from Joe Flacco (Billy Cundiff kick), 0:19. Ravens 10–7. Drive: 11 plays, 80 yards, 5:30.

Third quarter

- BAL – Billy Cundiff 29-yard field goal, 6:36 Ravens 13–7. Drive: 7 plays, 51 yards, 3:02.
- BAL – Billy Cundiff 29-yard field goal, 4:20. Ravens 16–7. Drive: 4 plays, 6 yards, 1:20.
- BAL – Anquan Boldin 4-yard pass from Joe Flacco (Billy Cundiff kick), 0:27. Ravens 23–7. Drive: 6 plays, 31 yards, 2:59.

Fourth quarter

- BAL – Willis McGahee 25-yard run (Billy Cundiff kick), 4:26. Ravens 30–7. Drive: 15 plays, 80 yards, 10:20.

Top passers

- BAL – Joe Flacco – 25/34, 265 yards, 2 TDs
- KC – Matt Cassel – 9/18, 70 yards, 3 INTs

Top rushers

- BAL – Ray Rice – 17 rushes, 57 yards
- KC – Jamaal Charles – 9 rushes, 82 yards, TD

Top receivers

- BAL – Todd Heap – 10 receptions, 108 yards
- KC – Dexter McCluster – 4 receptions, 17 yards

Baltimore dominated the game on both sides of the ball, massively out-gaining Kansas City in total yards (390 to 161), first downs (26 to 8), and time of possession (44:44 to 18:16). The Chiefs, who only lost 14 turnovers all year, turned the ball over five times and went home with their seventh consecutive playoff loss since the 1993 season. Their losing streak has covered 17 years, four different coaches, and two different owners.

Baltimore took the opening kickoff and drove 64 yards to a first down at the Chiefs 1-yard line, with Joe Flacco completing a 27-yard pass to Anquan Boldin and three passes to tight end Todd Heap for 32 yards. But they were stuffed twice for no gain and then Flacco's incomplete pass forced them to settle for a field goal from Billy Cundiff. The Ravens quickly forced a punt, but several plays into their next drive Chiefs linebacker Tamba Hali sacked Flacco and forced a fumble, which he recovered on the Baltimore 46. Following a 5-yard scramble by Matt Cassel, Jamaal Charles' 41-yard touchdown romp gave his team a 7–3 lead. It was the longest touchdown run ever allowed by the Ravens in the postseason. Later in the second quarter, the Ravens retook the lead with an 80-yard scoring drive. Ray Rice finished it with a 9-yard touchdown catch to give the Ravens a 10–7 lead with 19 seconds left before halftime.

In the second half, Baltimore completely took over the game, adding 20 more unanswered points and holding Charles, who rushed for over 80 yards in the first half, to negative yardage in the last two quarters. Kansas City gained just 25 total yards in the entire half.

On the fourth play of the opening second half drive, Cassel threw an interception to safety Haruki Nakamura. Kansas City managed to get the ball back when Charles forced and recovered a fumble from Nakamura during the return, but their second attempt at a drive fared no better and ended with a turnover on downs at the Ravens 38-yard line. Baltimore then drove to the Kansas City 11-yard line where Cundiff made his second field goal of the game. Then Ravens linebacker Ray Lewis forced a fumble while tackling Dexter McCluster that cornerback Chris Carr recovered on the Chiefs 17-yard line, setting up Cundiff's third field goal to increase their lead to 16–7. Just two plays into their next drive, Kansas City lost another turnover when Cassel threw an interception to Dawan Landry, which led to Flacco's 4-yard touchdown pass to Boldin. Then after a three and out, the Ravens put the game away by mounting a 10-minute scoring drive that ended with Willis McGahee's 25-yard touchdown burst with 4:26 left in the game, making the final score 30–7.

Flacco completed 25 of 34 passes for 265 yards and two touchdowns. He became the first Raven ever to throw multiple touchdown passes in a playoff game. Heap had a career-high 10 receptions for 106 yards, setting the franchise record for receptions in a postseason game. Linebacker Terrell Suggs led the Ravens defense with four tackles and two sacks. Cassel completed just nine of 18 passes for 70 yards with three interceptions, and Dwayne Bowe, the team's top receiver with 1,162 yards and an NFL-leading 15 touchdown catches during the season, did not have any receptions in the game.

This was the first postseason meeting between the Ravens and Chiefs.

==== NFC: Green Bay Packers 21, Philadelphia Eagles 16 ====
Green Bay Packers vs. Philadelphia Eagles – Game summary

Quarter	1	2	3	4	Total
Packers	7	7	7	0	21
Eagles	0	3	7	6	16

at Lincoln Financial Field, Philadelphia

- Date: January 9
- Game time: 4:30 p.m. EST
- Game weather: 30 °F (−1 °C), sunny
- Game attendance: 69,144
- Referee: Pete Morelli
- TV announcers (Fox): Joe Buck (play-by-play), Troy Aikman (color commentator), Pam Oliver, and Chris Myers (sideline reporters)
- Recap, Game book

Game information

First quarter

- GB – Tom Crabtree 7-yard pass from Aaron Rodgers (Mason Crosby kick), 0:08. Packers 7–0. Drive: 10 plays, 68 yards, 5:38.

Second quarter

- GB – James Jones 9-yard pass from Aaron Rodgers (Mason Crosby kick), 5:21. Packers 14–0. Drive: 12 plays, 57 yards, 7:00.
- PHI – David Akers 29-yard field goal, 1:11. Packers 14–3. Drive: 8 plays, 63 yards, 4:10.

Third quarter

- PHI – Jason Avant 24-yard pass from Michael Vick (David Akers kick), 13:50. Packers 14–10. Drive: 2 plays, 24 yards, 0:06.
- GB – Brandon Jackson 16-yard pass from Aaron Rodgers (Mason Crosby kick), 7:33. Packers 21–10. Drive: 11 plays, 80 yards, 6:17.

Fourth quarter

- PHI – Michael Vick 1-yard run (pass failed), 4:02. Packers 21–16. Drive: 13 plays, 75 yards, 4:48.

Top passers

- GB – Aaron Rodgers – 18/27, 180 yards, 3 TD
- PHI – Michael Vick – 20/36, 292 yards, TD, INT

Top rushers

- GB – James Starks – 23 rushes, 123 yards
- PHI – LeSean McCoy – 12 rushes, 46 yards

Top receivers

- GB – Donald Driver – 5 receptions, 56 yards
- PHI – Jason Avant – 7 receptions, 93 yards, TD

Tramon Williams' interception in the end zone sealed the Packers victory with 33 seconds left in the game. Green Bay never trailed during the entire game, and got big performances from Aaron Rodgers, who threw for 180 yards and three touchdowns, and James Starks, who rushed for 123 yards, which was more than his entire regular season total.

Philadelphia got an early scoring opportunity when they recovered a muffed punt at the Packers 41-yard line. But their drive was halted at the 23 and ended with no points when David Akers missed a 41-yard field goal attempt. Later on, the Packers drove 68 yards in 10 plays, featuring a 27-yard run by Starks. With eight seconds left in the quarter, Rodgers threw a 7-yard touchdown pass to reserve tight end Tom Crabtree, who had not caught a touchdown pass all season. In the second quarter, Williams' 8-yard punt return gave his team the ball at their 43-yard line, and they drove for another touchdown, scoring with Rodgers' 9-yard pass to James Jones. Getting the ball back with just over five minutes left, Philadelphia quarterback Michael Vick completed a 44-yard pass to Jeremy Maclin and rushed for 14 yards to set up a 29-yard field goal by Akers with 1:15 left in the half, putting the Eagles on the board for the first time. Late in the first half, with the Packers seeking to add to their lead, Rodgers threw a deep pass down the sideline to Jones for what would have been a sure touchdown, but the pass was dropped, keeping the score 14–3.

The Eagles scored quickly in the second half, taking advantage of Darryl Tapp's fumble recovery while sacking Rodgers on the Packers 24-yard line. One play later, Vick cut the score to 14–10 with a touchdown pass to Jason Avant. But Rodgers led his team back, completing two passes to Donald Driver for 26 yards and a 16-yarder to fullback John Kuhn before finishing the drive with a 16-yard screen pass to Brandon Jackson for a touchdown. Near the end of the quarter, the Eagles mounted a drive to the Packers 16-yard line, but came up empty when Akers missed another field goal, this one from 34 yards.

With 8:50 left in the game, Vick completed five of eight passes for 68 yards on a 75-yard touchdown drive, scoring on a fourth down 1-yard run. On a two-point conversion attempt, Vick completed a pass to tight end Brent Celek, but it was negated by a penalty against him for putting a foot out of bounds before he came back to catch the ball and their second attempt was incomplete, keeping the score at 21–16. Philadelphia had to use up all their timeouts on the Packers ensuring drive, but got the ball back with 1:45 left in the game. Receptions by DeSean Jackson and Riley Cooper for gains of 28 and 11 yards moved the ball to the Green Bay 24-yard line. But with 33 seconds left, Williams intercepted a pass intended for Cooper in the end zone to put the game away.

Vick finished with 290 passing yards and a touchdown, with one interception, and added 33 yards and another score on the ground.

This was the third postseason meeting between the Packers and Eagles. Philadelphia won both prior meetings, including the 2003 NFC Divisional playoffs, 20–17 in overtime in the game known as "4th and 26".

== Divisional round ==
=== Saturday, January 15, 2011 ===
==== AFC: Pittsburgh Steelers 31, Baltimore Ravens 24 ====
Baltimore Ravens vs. Pittsburgh Steelers – Game summary

Quarter	1	2	3	4	Total
Ravens	14	7	0	3	24
Steelers	7	0	14	10	31

at Heinz Field, Pittsburgh, Pennsylvania

- Date: January 15
- Game time: 4:30 p.m. EST
- Game weather: 36 °F (2 °C), cloudy
- Game attendance: 64,879
- Referee: Jeff Triplette
- TV announcers (CBS): Greg Gumbel (play-by-play) and Dan Dierdorf (color commentator)
- Recap, Game book

Game information

First quarter

- PIT – Rashard Mendenhall 1-yard run (Shaun Suisham kick), 6:18. Steelers 7–0. Drive: 10 plays, 80 yards, 6:04.
- BAL – Ray Rice 14-yard run (Billy Cundiff kick), 1:20. Tied 7–7. Drive: 10 plays, 68 yards, 4:58.
- BAL – Cory Redding 13-yard fumble return (Billy Cundiff kick), 0:53. Ravens 14–7.

Second quarter

- BAL – Todd Heap 4-yard pass from Joe Flacco (Billy Cundiff kick), 5:43. Ravens 21–7. Drive: 6 plays, 16 yards, 3:02.

Third quarter

- PIT – Heath Miller 9-yard pass from Ben Roethlisberger (Shaun Suisham kick), 9:11. Ravens 21–14. Drive: 2 plays, 23 yards, 0:50.
- PIT – Hines Ward 8-yard pass from Ben Roethlisberger (Shaun Suisham kick), 1:21. Tied 21–21. Drive: 4 plays, 25 yards, 2:17.

Fourth quarter

- PIT – Shaun Suisham 35-yard field goal, 12:15. Steelers 24–21. Drive: 8 plays, 6 yards, 3:49.
- BAL – Billy Cundiff 24-yard field goal, 3:54. Tied 24–24. Drive: 5 plays, 23 yards, 2:01.
- PIT – Rashard Mendenhall 2-yard run (Shaun Suisham kick), 1:33. Steelers 31–24. Drive: 11 plays, 65 yards, 2:21.

Top passers

- BAL – Joe Flacco – 16/30, 125 yards, TD, INT
- PIT – Ben Roethlisberger – 19/32, 226 yards, 2 TDs

Top rushers

- BAL – Ray Rice – 12 rushes, 32 yards, TD
- PIT – Rashard Mendenhall – 20 rushes, 46 yards, 2 TD

Top receivers

- BAL – Todd Heap – 3 receptions, 43 yards, TD
- PIT – Antonio Brown – 3 receptions, 75 yards

Steelers quarterback Ben Roethlisberger's 58-yard completion to Antonio Brown set up Rashard Mendenhall's game-winning 2-yard touchdown run with 1:33 left in the game. Despite the game's high score, it was a defensive battle, with both teams combining for just 389 yards and scoring most of their points off turnovers. Roethlisberger was sacked six times, and Baltimore quarterback Joe Flacco was sacked 5. Meanwhile, the Ravens were held to just 126 yards and were buried under a mountain of turnovers, penalties, and dropped passes.

After forcing the Ravens to punt on the opening drive, Pittsburgh drove 80 yards on the way to Mendenhall's 1-yard touchdown run, assisted by a 37-yard pass interference penalty on Baltimore cornerback Josh Wilson. But the Ravens countered with a 68-yard scoring drive, aided by a 33-yard pass interference penalty on Pittsburgh's Anthony Madison. Ray Rice finished the drive with a 14-yard touchdown run to tie the game. Then two plays into the Steelers' next drive, Roethlisberger was hit by Terrell Suggs as he pulled his arm back to throw a pass, resulting in a fumble. Nearly all the players on both teams thought it was an incomplete pass since the ball went forward and headed back to their huddles, but Ravens defensive end Cory Redding realized the play was still ongoing and returned the ball 13 yards for a touchdown.

In the second quarter, Ravens safety Ed Reed recovered a fumble from Mendenhall at the Steelers 16-yard line, setting up Flacco's 4-yard touchdown pass to Todd Heap that gave them a 21–7 lead. Pittsburgh responded with a drive to the Baltimore 25-yard line but came up empty when Shaun Suisham missed a 43-yard field goal attempt with 25 seconds left in the half.

However, the Steelers dominated the third quarter, forcing three turnovers and holding the Ravens to negative yardage. Less than five minutes into the quarter, Rice lost a fumble while being tackled by Ryan Clark, and linebacker LaMarr Woodley recovered it on the Baltimore 23-yard line. After a 14-yard run by Mendenhall, Roethlisberger threw a 9-yard touchdown pass to tight end Heath Miller. Then after an exchange of punts, Clark intercepted a pass from Flacco and returned it 17 yards to the Ravens 25-yard line. Mendenhall started the drive with a 13-yard screen, and Roethlisberger finished it with an 8-yard third down touchdown pass to Hines Ward, tying the game at 21. Just two plays after the ensuing kickoff, Flacco fumbled a snap, and Steelers defensive end Brett Keisel recovered it at the Baltimore 23. This time the Steelers were unable to get a touchdown, as Suggs sacked Roethlisberger on third down and six after driving inside the 10-yard line, but Suisham kicked a 35-yard field goal to give Pittsburgh their first lead with 12:15 left in regulation.

Later on, Baltimore's Lardarius Webb returned a punt 55 yards for a touchdown, only to have it called back by a holding penalty on Marcus Smith. Still, his return gave them good field position on the Steelers 29-yard line. On the drive's first play, Flacco completed a 21-yard pass to Heap. But over the next three plays, Baltimore rushers were stuffed twice, and then receiver Anquan Boldin dropped a pass in the end zone, forcing them to settle for Billy Cundiff's field goal to tie the score with 3:54 remaining in the game.

David Johnson returned the ensuing kickoff 16 yards to the 35-yard line, and Pittsburgh retook the lead with a 65-yard drive featuring three key third-down conversions. After starting out with two incompletions, Roethlisberger threw a 12-yard pass to Ward on third down and ten. Then Roethlisberger was sacked for a 9-yard loss by Redding and Paul Kruger and threw another incompletion, bringing up third down and 19 with 2:07 to go. In the next play, Roethlisberger dropped back and launched a 58-yard bomb to Brown at the 4-yard line. After a defensive holding penalty moved the ball to the 1, the Ravens' defense kept Mendenhall out of the end zone for two more plays. But on third down, he scored on a 2-yard touchdown run to give the Steelers a 31–24 lead with 1:33 remaining in regulation.

Le'Ron McClain returned Suisham's squib kick 12 yards to the Steelers 48-yard line, giving Baltimore a chance to drive for the tying touchdown. But their offense was unable to move the ball. After two incompletions and an 8-yard sack by Ziggy Hood, receiver T. J. Houshmandzadeh dropped a potential first down catch, ending any chance of a comeback.

Roethlisberger completed 19 of 32 passes for 226 yards and two touchdowns. Steelers linebacker James Harrison recorded five tackles, two assists, and three sacks. Suggs finished with five tackles, three sacks, and a forced fumble. With this win, Pittsburgh advanced to their fourth AFC Championship Game since 2004.

This was the third postseason meeting between the Ravens and Steelers. Pittsburgh won both prior meetings, which includes winning 23–14 in the 2008 AFC Championship Game.

==== NFC: Green Bay Packers 48, Atlanta Falcons 21 ====
Green Bay Packers vs. Atlanta Falcons – Game summary

Quarter	1	2	3	4	Total
Packers	0	28	14	6	48
Falcons	7	7	0	7	21

at Georgia Dome, Atlanta

- Date: January 15
- Game time: 8:00 p.m. EST
- Game weather: Played indoors, domed stadium
- Game attendance: 69,210
- Referee: John Parry
- TV announcers (Fox): Joe Buck (play-by-play), Troy Aikman (color commentator), Pam Oliver, and Chris Myers (sideline reporters)
- Recap, Game book

Game information

First quarter

- ATL – Michael Turner 12-yard run (Matt Bryant kick), 5:00. Falcons 7–0. Drive: 7 plays, 48 yards, 3:55.

Second quarter

- GB – Jordy Nelson 6-yard pass from Aaron Rodgers (Mason Crosby kick), 12:04. Tied 7–7. Drive: 13 plays, 81 yards, 7:56.
- ATL – Eric Weems 102-yard kickoff return (Matt Bryant kick), 11:50. Falcons 14–7.
- GB – John Kuhn 1-yard run (Mason Crosby kick), 6:06. Tied 14–14. Drive: 10 plays, 92 yards, 5:44.
- GB – James Jones 20-yard pass from Aaron Rodgers (Mason Crosby kick), 0:42. Packers 21–14. Drive: 7 plays, 80 yards, 1:38.
- GB – Tramon Williams 70-yard interception return for a TD(Mason Crosby kick), 0:00. Packers 28–14.

Third quarter

- GB – Aaron Rodgers 7-yard run (Mason Crosby kick), 8:28. Packers 35–14. Drive: 12 plays, 80 yards, 6:32.
- GB – John Kuhn 7-yard pass from Aaron Rodgers (Mason Crosby kick), 2:41. Packers 42–14. Drive: 8 plays, 50 yards, 4:48.

Fourth quarter

- ATL – Roddy White 6-yard pass from Matt Ryan (Matt Bryant kick), 14:21. Packers 42–21. Drive: 7 plays, 73 yards, 3:20.
- GB – Mason Crosby 43-yard field goal, 6:29. Packers 45–21. Drive: 8 plays, 19 yards, 5:10.
- GB – Mason Crosby 32-yard field goal, 1:56. Packers 48–21. Drive: 6 plays, 19 yards, 3:36.

Top passers

- GB – Aaron Rodgers – 31/36, 366 yards, 3 TD
- ATL – Matt Ryan – 20/29, 186 yards, TD, 2 INT

Top rushers

- GB – James Starks – 25 rushes, 66 yards
- ATL – Michael Turner – 10 rushes, 39 yards, TD

Top receivers

- GB – Greg Jennings – 8 receptions, 101 yards
- ATL – Michael Jenkins – 6 receptions, 67 yards

The Packers blew out Atlanta by racking up 442 total yards, 28 first downs, and a franchise playoff record 48 points. Aaron Rodgers was nearly perfect, completing 31 of 36 passes for 366 yards and three touchdowns, while adding another score on the ground. Green Bay never punted the ball and got a big performance from cornerback Tramon Williams, who picked off two passes from Matt Ryan and returned one of them 70 yards for a touchdown.

But early in the game, it seemed things would go in Atlanta's favor. After Michael Koenen's 33-yard punt pinned the Packers back at their 8-yard line, Rodgers threw a short pass to Greg Jennings, who took off for a 30-yard gain. But he fumbled the ball after being hit from behind by Stephen Nicholas and Brent Grimes recovered the ball at the Green Bay 48-yard line. On the Falcons ensuing drive, a 22-yard reception by Michael Jenkins and a fourth down conversion run by Ovie Mughelli set up a 12-yard touchdown run by Michael Turner. Green Bay responded with an 81-yard scoring drive that took nearly eight minutes. Rodgers completed all seven of his passes for 48 yards on the drive, the last one a 6-yard touchdown toss to Jordy Nelson, who caught the ball near the sidelines and just managed to stretch the ball into the pylon while being shoved out of bounds. However, Atlanta quickly retook the lead when Eric Weems returned Mason Crosby's kickoff 102 yards for a touchdown, the longest scoring play in NFL playoff history.

But the Packers suddenly stormed back with 35 unanswered points. Rodgers quickly completed two passes to Jennings for 22 yards and then hit James Jones for a 34-yard gain to the Falcons 16-yard line. Two plays later, fullback John Kuhn scored a 1-yard touchdown run to tie the game. Atlanta responded with a drive to the Packers 19-yard line. But on the next play, Charles Woodson sacked Ryan for a 7-yard loss. Then on third down, Williams stepped in front of a pass intended for Jenkins and made a leaping interception in the end zone. Rodgers took over and went back to work, completing six consecutive passes on an 80-yard scoring drive that ended with his 20-yard touchdown completion to Jones, giving the Packers a 21–14 lead with 42 seconds left before halftime. Aided by two pass interference penalties against Green Bay, Atlanta drove to the Packers' 26-yard line. But once again the defense prevented a score. First linebacker Clay Matthews sacked Ryan for a 9-yard loss. Rather than attempt a 50-yard field goal, the Falcons tried one last play to move the ball closer. But Williams intercepted Ryan's pass and returned it 70 yards for a touchdown as time expired in the half.

In the second half, the Packers picked up right where they left off. Rodgers was sacked by John Abraham for a 10-yard loss on the first play. But it didn't stop Rodgers from completing five of six passes for 56 yards on an 80-yard scoring drive that ended with his 7-yard touchdown run, making the score 35–14. Atlanta was forced to a three-and-out on their next drive after a Green Bay replay challenge overruled a first down catch by Jenkins, and Koenen's punt went just 21 yards to midfield. Green Bay subsequently drove 50 yards and scored with Rodgers' 7-yard pass to Kuhn.

This time, the Falcons finally managed to respond. Ryan completed seven consecutive passes on their next drive, the last one a 6-yard touchdown throw to Roddy White. But Green Bay dominated the rest of the game, forcing two more turnovers that were both converted into field goals by Crosby, making the final score 48–21.

Jennings finished with eight receptions for 101 yards, while Nelson added eight receptions for 79 yards and a touchdown. This game gave Rodgers 10 touchdown passes in his first three playoff games, setting an NFL postseason record. Matthews had three tackles and two sacks. Weems had six kickoff returns for 195 yards. Turner, who rushed for over 1,300 yards during the season, was held to just 39 yards on 10 carries.

The Falcons' loss marked the third time in the last four seasons that the NFC's top seed would not advance past its first playoff game.

This was the third postseason meeting between the Packers and Falcons, with both teams having split the two prior meetings. The most recent before this game ended 27–7 in favor of Atlanta in the 2002 NFC Wild Card playoffs in Green Bay's first-ever playoff loss at Lambeau Field.

=== Sunday, January 16, 2011 ===
==== NFC: Chicago Bears 35, Seattle Seahawks 24 ====
Seattle Seahawks vs. Chicago Bears – Game summary

Quarter	1	2	3	4	Total
Seahawks	0	0	3	21	24
Bears	14	7	7	7	35

at Soldier Field, Chicago, Illinois

- Date: January 16
- Game time: 1:00 p.m. EST/12:00 p.m. CST
- Game weather: 24 °F (−4 °C), cloudy
- Game attendance: 62,265
- Referee: Alberto Riveron
- TV announcers (Fox): Kenny Albert (play-by-play), Daryl Johnston (color commentator), and Tony Siragusa (sideline reporter)
- Recap, Game book

Game information

First quarter

- CHI – Greg Olsen 58-yard pass from Jay Cutler (Robbie Gould kick), 12:08. Bears 7–0. Drive: 3 plays, 66 yards, 1:17.
- CHI – Chester Taylor 1-yard run (Robbie Gould kick), 1:19. Bears 14–0. Drive: 8 plays, 50 yards, 4:05.

Second quarter

- CHI – Jay Cutler 6-yard run (Robbie Gould kick), 10:01. Bears 21–0. Drive: 9 plays, 63 yards, 4:11.

Third quarter

- CHI – Jay Cutler 9-yard run (Robbie Gould kick), 4:12. Bears 28–0. Drive: 14 plays, 70 yards, 7:59.
- SEA – Olindo Mare 30-yard field goal, 1:52. Bears 28–3. Drive: 7 plays, 18 yards, 2:20.

Fourth quarter

- SEA – Mike Williams 2-yard pass from Matt Hasselbeck (Olindo Mare kick), 11:21. Bears 28–10. Drive: 9 plays, 33 yards, 2:01.
- CHI – Kellen Davis 39-yard pass from Jay Cutler (Robbie Gould kick), 4:40. Bears 35–10. Drive: 3 plays, 48 yards, 1:37.
- SEA – Mike Williams 3-yard pass from Matt Hasselbeck (Olindo Mare kick), 2:16. Bears 35–17. Drive: 7 plays, 74 yards, 2:24.
- SEA – Brandon Stokley 9-yard pass from Matt Hasselbeck (Olindo Mare kick), 1:24. Bears 35–24. Drive: 2 plays, 55 yards, 0:27.

Top passers

- SEA – Matt Hasselbeck – 26/46, 258 yards, 3 TD
- CHI – Jay Cutler – 15/28, 274 yards, 2 TD

Top rushers

- SEA – Golden Tate – 1 rush, 13 yards
- CHI – Matt Forte – 25 rushes, 80 yards

Top receivers

- SEA – Brandon Stokley – 8 receptions, 85 yards, TD
- CHI – Greg Olsen – 3 receptions, 113 yards, TD

Chicago dominated the game from start to finish, outgaining Seattle in total yards 437 to 276, and scoring 28 unanswered points over the first three quarters.

After forcing Seattle to a three-and-out on the opening drive, Chicago scored on their third play of the game when tight end Greg Olsen ran past safety Lawyer Milloy, caught a pass from Jay Cutler, and took it 58 yards to the end zone. Later in the quarter, Bears receiver Devin Hester returned a punt 26 yards to midfield. Following a 33-yard reception by Olsen and a fourth down conversion run by Cutler, Chester Taylor scored on a 1-yard touchdown run. After forcing a punt, Chicago got the ball back on their 37-yard line early in the second quarter. Cutler started the drive with a 22-yard completion to Olsen and later finished it with a 6-yard touchdown run to give the Bears a 21–0 lead.

In the second half, Chicago increased their lead to 28–0 with Cutler's second touchdown run at the end of a 14-play, 70-yard drive. After being completely dominated up to this point, Seattle managed to mount a comeback. First, Leon Washington's 62-yard kickoff return set up a 30-yard field goal by Olindo Mare. Then Seahawks linebacker Aaron Curry intercepted a pass from Bears running back Matt Forte and returned it 23 yards to the Bears 33-yard line. Aided by a defensive holding penalty on Tim Jennings that nullified his interception, Seattle cut the score to 28–10 with Matt Hasselbeck's 2-yard touchdown pass to Mike Williams.

But after forcing a punt, Tommie Harris sacked Hasselbeck on third down at his 13-yard line, and Jon Ryan's punt went just 35 yards to the Seattle 48. Two plays later, Cutler threw a 39-yard touchdown pass to tight end Kellen Davis, putting Chicago up 35–10.

With less than five minutes remaining in the game, Seattle refused to give up. Hasselbeck completed six consecutive passes on the next drive, the last a 17-yard touchdown strike to Williams. After forcing a punt, Hasselbeck completed a 46-yarder to Ben Obomanu and followed it up with a 9-yard touchdown pass to Brandon Stokley, bringing the score to 35–24. But Chicago put the game away by recovering Mare's onside kick with 1:25 left in the game.

Cutler finished his first career playoff game completing 15 of 28 passes for 274 yards and two touchdowns, with no interceptions. He also rushed for 43 yards and two scores. His 43 rushing yards were the most by a Bears quarterback in the postseason since Sid Luckman in 1943. He also joined Otto Graham as one of two players ever to run and throw for multiple touchdowns in a playoff game. Olsen had three receptions for 113 yards, all in the first half. Forte rushed for 80 yards, caught three passes for 54 yards, and threw one pass which was intercepted. Harris had two sacks, which were his only tackles of the game. Hasselbeck threw for 258 yards and three touchdowns. Stokley had eight catches for 85 yards and a score.

This was the second postseason meeting between the Seahawks and Bears. Chicago won the only prior meeting 27–24 in overtime in the 2006 NFC Divisional playoffs.

This was Matt Hasselbeck's final game in a Seahawks uniform as he would be traded to Tennessee the next season.

==== AFC: New York Jets 28, New England Patriots 21 ====
New York Jets vs. New England Patriots – Game summary

Quarter	1	2	3	4	Total
Jets	0	14	0	14	28
Patriots	3	0	8	10	21

at Gillette Stadium, Foxborough, Massachusetts

- Date: January 16
- Game time: 4:30 p.m. EST
- Game weather: 30 °F (−1 °C), clear
- Game attendance: 68,756
- Referee: Bill Leavy
- TV announcers (CBS): Jim Nantz (play-by-play) and Phil Simms (color commentator)
- Recap, Game book

Game information

First quarter

- NE – Shayne Graham 34-yard field goal, 1:12. Patriots 3–0. Drive: 11 plays, 63 yards, 4:32.

Second quarter

- NYJ – LaDainian Tomlinson 7-yard pass from Mark Sanchez (Nick Folk kick), 10:24. Jets 7–3. Drive: 5 plays, 49 yards, 1:56.
- NYJ – Braylon Edwards 15-yard pass from Mark Sanchez (Nick Folk kick), 0:33. Jets 14–3. Drive: 4 plays, 37 yards, 0:33.

Third quarter

- NE – Alge Crumpler 2-yard pass from Tom Brady (Sammy Morris run), 0:13. Jets 14–11. Drive: 8 plays, 80 yards, 3:51.

Fourth quarter

- NYJ – Santonio Holmes 7-yard pass from Mark Sanchez (Nick Folk kick), 13:00. Jets 21–11. Drive: 5 plays, 75 yards, 2:13.
- NE – Shayne Graham 35-yard field goal, 1:57. Jets 21–14. Drive: 7 plays, 26 yards, 1:32.
- NYJ – Shonn Greene 16-yard run (Nick Folk kick), 1:41. Jets 28–14. Drive: 2 plays, 20 yards, 0:16.
- NE – Deion Branch 13-yard pass from Tom Brady (Shayne Graham kick), 0:24. Jets 28–21. Drive: 7 plays, 59 yards, 1:17.

Top passers

- NYJ – Mark Sanchez – 16/25, 194 yards, 3 TD
- NE – Tom Brady – 29/45, 299 yards, 2 TD, INT

Top rushers

- NYJ – Shonn Greene – 17 rushes, 76 yards, TD
- NE – Danny Woodhead – 14 rushes, 46 yards

Top receivers

- NYJ – Jerricho Cotchery – 5 receptions, 96 yards
- NE – Rob Gronkowski – 4 receptions, 65 yards

Mark Sanchez completed 16 of 25 passes for 194 yards and three touchdowns to lead the Jets to victory, avenging a 45–3 loss to New England in December.

On the Patriots’ first drive, Tom Brady threw his first interception since Week 6 of the regular season, which linebacker David Harris picked off and returned 58 yards before tight end Alge Crumpler made a touchdown-saving tackle at the 12-yard line. New York was unable to score off the turnover, as they were unable to get a first down and Nick Folk missed a 30-yard field goal attempt. Several plays into New England's next drive, Brady completed a 28-yard pass to Crumpler at the Jets' 12-yard line. But after a 5-yard run by Danny Woodhead, Crumpler dropped a pass in the end zone, and then Brady was sacked by Shaun Ellis, forcing them to settle for Shayne Graham's 34-yard field goal to give them a 3–0 lead.

In the second quarter, a third-down sack of Brady by Drew Coleman forced New England to punt from their own 16, and Jerricho Cotchery returned the ball to the Patriots' 49-yard line. A few plays later, Sanchez's 37-yard completion to Braylon Edwards set up his 7-yard touchdown pass to LaDainian Tomlinson. Later on, New England attempted a fake punt with a direct snap to safety Patrick Chung on fourth down and four. But Chung fumbled the snap and was tackled on his 25-yard line, and the Jets converted the turnover with Sanchez's 15-yard touchdown pass to Edwards with 33 seconds left in the half, making the score 14–3.

Late in the third quarter, New England drove 80 yards in 11 plays, with Brady completing a 37-yard pass to Rob Gronkowski and two passes to Deion Branch for 28 yards on the way to a 2-yard touchdown pass to Crumpler. Then Sammy Morris scored a two-point conversion run, cutting their deficit to 14–11. But the Jets quickly countered, with Sanchez throwing a short pass to Cotchery, who took it 58 yards to the Patriots 13-yard line. Two plays later, Sanchez threw a high pass for Santonio Holmes, who managed to catch the ball and land in the end zone while falling out of bounds, giving New York a 10-point lead two minutes into the fourth quarter.

After the kickoff, New England drove to the Jets' 34-yard line with an eight-minute drive but then faced fourth down and 13. Rather than risk a 52-yard field goal attempt, they attempted to get the first down, but Branch dropped a pass from Brady and the Patriots turned the ball over. New England's defense then made a key defensive stand, forcing a quick three-and-out, and Julian Edelman returned Steve Weatherford's punt 41 yards to the New York 43-yard line before being tackled by Weatherford himself. Brady then led New England to the 17-yard line where Graham made his second field goal to cut their deficit to seven points. However, Jets corner Antonio Cromartie recovered Graham's onside kick attempt and returned it 23 yards to the Patriots 20-yard line. Shonn Greene then scored with a 16-yard run, making the score 28–14 with 1:41 left in the game.

Brandon Tate returned the ensuing kickoff 23 yards to the 41-yard line, sparking a 59-yard scoring drive that ended with Brady's 13-yard touchdown pass to Branch with 24 seconds left. But Graham's second attempt at an onside kick also failed, ending any chance of a miracle comeback and sealing the miracle upset for the Jets.

Brady finished the game 29 of 45 for 299 yards and two touchdowns, with one interception. His one pick ended his NFL record of consecutive passes without an interception at 340. Cotchery had five receptions for 96 yards, Harris had nine tackles, three assists, and an interception, while Ellis added five tackles and two sacks. With this win, the Jets advanced to their second consecutive AFC Championship Game in Sanchez's first two years as a starter.

This would be the last time the Patriots would get eliminated before the AFC Championship Game until 2019. This was the last playoff win by an AFC East team other than New England until the Bills’ in 2020.

This was the third postseason meeting between the Jets and Patriots. New England won both prior meetings, including a 37–16 victory in the 2006 AFC Wild Card playoffs.

== Conference championships ==
=== Sunday, January 23, 2011 ===
==== NFC: Green Bay Packers 21, Chicago Bears 14 ====
Green Bay Packers vs Chicago Bears – Game summary

Quarter	1	2	3	4	Total
Packers	7	7	0	7	21
Bears	0	0	0	14	14

at Soldier Field, Chicago, Illinois

- Date: January 23
- Game time: 3:00 p.m. EST/2:00 p.m. CST
- Game weather: 20 °F (−7 °C), partly cloudy
- Game attendance: 62,377
- Referee: Terry McAulay
- TV announcers (Fox): Joe Buck (play-by-play), Troy Aikman (color commentator), Pam Oliver, and Chris Myers (sideline reporters)
- Recap, Game book

Game information

First quarter

- GB – Aaron Rodgers 1-yard run (Mason Crosby kick), 10:50. Packers 7–0. Drive: 7 plays, 84 yards, 4:10.

Second quarter

- GB – James Starks 4-yard run (Mason Crosby kick), 11:13. Packers 14–0. Drive: 5 plays, 44 yards, 2:53.

Third quarter

- No scoring plays.

Fourth quarter

- CHI – Chester Taylor 1-yard run (Robbie Gould kick), 12:02. Packers 14–7. Drive: 8 plays, 67 yards, 3:55.
- GB – B. J. Raji 18-yard interception return (Mason Crosby kick), 6:04. Packers 21–7.
- CHI – Earl Bennett 35-yard pass from Caleb Hanie (Robbie Gould kick), 4:43. Packers 21–14. Drive: 4 plays, 60 yards, 1:21.

Top passers

- GB – Aaron Rodgers – 17/30, 244 yards, 2 INT
- CHI – Caleb Hanie – 13/20, 153 yards, TD, 2 INT

Top rushers

- GB – James Starks – 22 rushes, 74 yards, TD
- CHI – Matt Forte – 17 rushes, 70 yards

Top receivers

- GB – Greg Jennings – 8 receptions, 130 yards
- CHI – Matt Forte – 10 receptions, 90 yards

Green Bay's defense knocked Chicago starting quarterback Jay Cutler out of the game and intercepted three passes, one of which was returned for a score, and another which ended a last-minute drive for a potential tying touchdown. With this win, the Packers became the first NFC #6 seed to advance to the Super Bowl by defeating the top three seeded teams on the road.

Packers quarterback Aaron Rodgers opened up the game with two completions to Greg Jennings for gains of 26 and 22 yards. A few plays later, he threw a 22-yard completion to Jordy Nelson at the Bears 2-yard line, setting up his 1-yard touchdown run to give the Packers an early 7–0 lead. Later on, Tim Masthay's 32-yard punt pinned Chicago back on their 2-yard line. The Bears were unable to move the ball, and Tramon Williams returned Brad Maynard's punt six yards to the 44. Rodgers then completed passes to Brandon Jackson and Nelson for gains of 16 and 15 yards on the way to a 4-yard touchdown run by James Starks.

With time running out in the half, Rodgers threw a pass that was intercepted by Lance Briggs and returned to the Chicago 43. But Cutler returned the favor with an interception thrown to Sam Shields and the score remained 14–0 going into halftime. Cutler was injured on the play and although he returned for a few plays in the third quarter, he ended up having to sit the rest of the second half out.

After forcing Chicago to punt on the opening second-half drive, Green Bay drove to the Bears 6-yard line. But linebacker Brian Urlacher ended the drive by intercepting Rodgers and returning the ball 39 yards before Rodgers made a touchdown-saving tackle on the 45. However, Chicago could not take advantage of the turnover and had to punt. Cutler's replacement, Todd Collins, ended up being ineffective, throwing four consecutive incompletions before being benched in favor of Caleb Hanie with less than a minute left in the third quarter.

Early in the fourth quarter, Hanie's 32-yard completion to Johnny Knox moved the ball to the Packers 1-yard line, setting up a touchdown run by Chester Taylor that cut the score to 14–7. But three drives later, Hanie threw a short pass over the middle that was intercepted by nose tackle B. J. Raji and returned 18 yards for a touchdown. Hanie responded with four consecutive completions on the Bears' next drive and finished it with a 35-yard touchdown throw to Earl Bennett, making the score 21–14. Then after forcing a punt, Chicago got the ball back with 2:53 remaining in the game and managed to drive to the Packers' 29-yard line. But Green Bay's defense managed to hang on for the win, ending the drive with Shields' second interception with 37 seconds left in regulation.

Jennings caught eight passes for 130 yards. Bears running back Matt Forte rushed for 70 yards and caught 10 passes for 90. Shields had four tackles, two interceptions, a sack, and a forced fumble. Urlacher had nine tackles, a sack, and an interception. At 338 pounds, Raji became the heaviest player in NFL history to score a touchdown.

In possibly the NFL's first player-on-player social media attack, Cutler was being criticized for not returning within seconds after leaving the game instead of waiting for explanations in postgame media sessions. Bears coach Lovie Smith later stated that the choice was not Cutler's decision. Smith made the decision to bench Cutler after consulting the medical and training staff. An MRI revealed the following day that he had sprained his MCL.

The Bears would not return to the playoffs again until 2018.

This was the second postseason meeting in the history of the Bears-Packers rivalry, with Chicago having won the prior meeting 33–14 in the 1941 Western Division playoff.

==== AFC: Pittsburgh Steelers 24, New York Jets 19 ====
New York Jets vs. Pittsburgh Steelers – Game summary

Quarter	1	2	3	4	Total
Jets	0	3	7	9	19
Steelers	7	17	0	0	24

at Heinz Field, Pittsburgh, Pennsylvania

- Date: January 23
- Game time: 6:30 p.m. EST
- Game weather: 15 °F (−9 °C), partly cloudy
- Game attendance: 66,662
- Referee: Ed Hochuli
- TV announcers (CBS): Jim Nantz (play-by-play), Phil Simms (color commentator), and Steve Tasker (sideline reporter)
- Recap, Game book

Game information

First quarter

- PIT – Rashard Mendenhall 1-yard run (Shaun Suisham kick), 5:54. Steelers 7–0. Drive: 15 plays, 66 yards, 9:06.

Second quarter

- PIT – Shaun Suisham 20-yard field goal, 6:51. Steelers 10–0. Drive: 8 plays, 60 yards, 3:41.
- PIT – Ben Roethlisberger 2-yard run (Shaun Suisham kick), 2:00. Steelers 17–0. Drive: 7 plays, 66 yards, 3:57.
- PIT – William Gay 19-yard fumble return (Shaun Suisham kick), 1:13. Steelers 24–0.
- NYJ – Nick Folk 42-yard field goal, 0:09. Steelers 24–3. Drive: 7 plays, 44 yards, 1:04.

Third quarter

- NYJ – Santonio Holmes 45-yard pass from Mark Sanchez (Nick Folk kick), 12:13. Steelers 24–10. Drive: 5 plays, 90 yards, 2:47.

Fourth quarter

- NYJ – Ben Roethlisberger tackled in the end zone by Mike DeVito for a safety, 7:38. Steelers 24–12.
- NYJ – Jerricho Cotchery 4-yard pass from Mark Sanchez (Nick Folk kick), 3:06. Steelers 24–19. Drive: 10 plays, 58 yards, 4:32.

Top passers

- NYJ – Mark Sanchez – 20/33, 233 yards, 2 TD
- PIT – Ben Roethlisberger – 10/19, 133 yards, 2 INT

Top rushers

- NYJ – Shonn Greene – 9 rushes, 52 yards
- PIT – Rashard Mendenhall – 27 rushes, 121 yards, TD

Top receivers

- NYJ – Dustin Keller – 8 receptions, 64 yards
- PIT – Heath Miller – 2 receptions, 38 yards

Pittsburgh jumped to an early 24–0 lead and held off a desperate comeback rally to earn their third Super Bowl bid in the last six years.

Steelers running back Rashard Mendenhall rushed eight times for 28 yards on their opening drive, which took over nine minutes off the clock and ended with his 1-yard touchdown run. Then he rushed four times for 22 yards and caught an 18-yard pass on a drive to the Jets' 32-yard line. Linebacker Bryan Thomas ended the drive with an interception, but the Steelers forced a punt and drove for another score, aided by Mendenhall's 35-yard burst. Shaun Suisham finished the drive with a 20-yard field goal to make the score 10–0. Following another punt, Ben Roethlisberger completed a 24-yard pass to tight end Heath Miller, a 20-yarder to Emmanuel Sanders, and a 14-yard throw to Mendenhall on the way to a 2-yard touchdown run. Two plays after the ensuing kickoff, Ike Taylor sacked Jets quarterback Mark Sanchez on a defensive back blitz and forced a fumble, which cornerback William Gay returned 19 yards for a touchdown, increasing their lead to 24–0 with just over a minute left in the half. This time New York managed to respond, with Sanchez completing four passes for 39 yards on a drive that ended with a 42-yard field goal by Nick Folk, cutting the score to 24–3 going into halftime.

New York took the second-half kickoff and scored with just five plays. Shonn Greene started the drive with a 23-yard run, while Sanchez finished it with a pair of completions to Santonio Holmes, the first for 16 yards, and the second a 45-yard touchdown completion. Pittsburgh responded with a drive to the Jets' 37-yard line but turned the ball over when safety Brodney Pool intercepted a pass from Roethlisberger inside the 10. After an exchange of punts, the Jets converted two fourth downs on a 17-play drive to a first down on the Steelers' 2-yard line. But Pittsburgh's defense made a key goal-line stand. First Greene tried to run up the middle but was stuffed at the 1-yard line. Then Sanchez threw an incomplete pass and another that was batted down by linebacker LaMarr Woodley. On fourth down, LaDainian Tomlinson tried to run through the middle, but Brett Keisel and Casey Hampton tackled him for no gain, turning the ball over.

On the next play, Roethlisberger fumbled a snap and was downed in the end zone for a safety. New York then drove 58 yards following the free kick and scored with Sanchez's 4-yard touchdown pass to Jerricho Cotchery, cutting their deficit to 24–19 with 3:06 left in the game. But the Steelers managed to pick up two key first downs on their next drive with a 14-yard reception by Miller and a 14-yard catch by Antonio Brown on third down and six with less than two minutes left, enabling them to run out the rest of the clock.

Mendenhall rushed for 121 yards and a touchdown, while also catching two passes for 32. Sanchez threw for 233 yards and two touchdowns. Pool had six tackles and an interception.

As of 2025, this is the Jets' most recent playoff game, and the latest AFC Championship Game to not feature either the New England Patriots or the Kansas City Chiefs.

This was the second postseason meeting between the Jets and Steelers, with Pittsburgh winning the only prior meeting 20–17 in overtime in the 2004 AFC Divisional playoffs.

== Super Bowl XLV: Green Bay Packers 31, Pittsburgh Steelers 25 ==
Super Bowl XLV – Pittsburgh Steelers vs. Green Bay Packers – Game summary

Quarter	1	2	3	4	Total
Steelers (AFC)	0	10	7	8	25
Packers (NFC)	14	7	0	10	31

at Cowboys Stadium, Arlington, Texas

- Date: February 6
- Game time: 6:30 p.m. EST/5:30 p.m. CST
- Game weather: Played with roof closed, retractable roof stadium
- Game attendance: 103,219
- Referee: Walt Anderson
- TV announcers (Fox): Joe Buck (play-by-play), Troy Aikman (color commentator), Pam Oliver, and Chris Myers (sideline reporters)
- Recap, Game book

Game information

First quarter

- GB – Jordy Nelson 29-yard pass from Aaron Rodgers (Mason Crosby kick), 3:44. Packers 7–0. Drive: 9 plays, 80 yards, 4:33.
- GB – Nick Collins 37-yard interception return (Mason Crosby kick), 3:20. Packers 14–0.

Second quarter

- PIT – Shaun Suisham 33-yard field goal, 11:08. Packers 14–3. Drive: 13 plays, 49 yards, 7:12.
- GB – Greg Jennings 21-yard pass from Aaron Rodgers (Mason Crosby kick), 2:24. Packers 21–3. Drive: 4 plays, 53 yards, 2:04.
- PIT – Hines Ward 8-yard pass from Ben Roethlisberger (Shaun Suisham kick), 0:39. Packers 21–10. Drive: 7 plays, 77 yards, 1:45.

Third quarter

- PIT – Rashard Mendenhall 8-yard run (Shaun Suisham kick), 10:19. Packers 21–17. Drive: 5 plays, 50 yards, 2:20.

Fourth quarter

- GB – Greg Jennings 8-yard pass from Aaron Rodgers (Mason Crosby kick), 11:57. Packers 28–17. Drive: 8 plays, 55 yards, 2:53.
- PIT – Mike Wallace 25-yard pass from Ben Roethlisberger (Antwaan Randle El run), 7:34. Packers 28–25. Drive: 7 plays, 66 yards, 4:23.
- GB – Mason Crosby 23-yard field goal, 2:07. Packers 31–25. Drive: 10 plays, 70 yards, 5:27.

Top passers

- PIT – Ben Roethlisberger – 25/40, 263 yards, 2 TD, 2 INT
- GB – Aaron Rodgers – 24/39, 304 yards, 3 TD

Top rushers

- PIT – Rashard Mendenhall – 14 rushes, 63 yards, TD
- GB – James Starks – 11 rushes, 52 yards

Top receivers

- PIT – Mike Wallace – 9 receptions, 89 yards, TD
- GB – Jordy Nelson – 9 receptions, 140 yards, TD

This was the first Super Bowl meeting between the Steelers and Packers.
