= Allen Webb =

American football player (born 1983)

Profile
- Position: Quarterback

Personal information
- Born: September 13, 1983 (age 43); Denver, Colorado
- Listed height: 6 ft 3 in (1.91 m)
- Listed weight: 190 lb (86 kg)

Career information
- High school: Chatfield (Jefferson County, Colorado)
- College: Indiana Hoosiers (2002); Kansas State Wildcats (2004–2005)

Allen Webb (born September 13, 1983) was a quarterback for the Kansas State Wildcats football team in 2004 and 2005, and before that was at Indiana.

Webb signed out of high school to play at Indiana in 2002, but then transferred after one year to Kansas State. He was forced to sit out the 2003 season by NCAA transfer rules. He went on to start ten games in 2004 and 2005. He shared time at quarterback with Allan Evridge.
