= 2011 Green Bay Packers season =

NFL team season

- Owner: Green Bay Packers, Inc. (112,159 stockholders)
- General manager: Ted Thompson
- Head coach: Mike McCarthy
- Offensive coordinator: Joe Philbin
- Defensive coordinator: Dom Capers
- Home stadium: Lambeau Field

Results
- Record: 15–1
- Division place: 1st NFC North
- Playoffs: Lost Divisional Playoffs (vs. Giants) 20–37
- All-Pros: 3: QB Aaron Rodgers (1st team); CB Charles Woodson (1st team); FB John Kuhn (2nd team)
- Pro Bowlers: 7: QB Aaron Rodgers; FB John Kuhn; WR Greg Jennings; C Scott Wells; NT B. J. Raji; OLB Clay Matthews III; CB Charles Woodson

Uniform
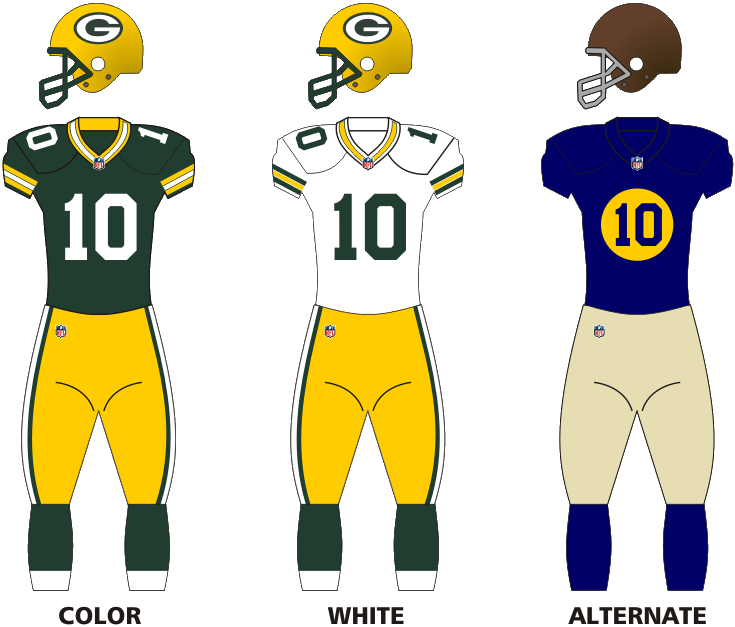

The 2011 season was the Green Bay Packers' 91st in the National Football League (NFL), their 93rd overall and their sixth under head coach Mike McCarthy. The team not only improved on their 10–6 record from a season earlier, they became just the sixth team in NFL history to win 15 games during the regular season. As of 2026, the 15–1 record stands as the best in team history, as well as the best record for a defending Super Bowl champion. The Packers won their first 13 games of the season to extend their winning streak from the previous season to 19, the second-longest in NFL history behind the 21-game winning streak of the New England Patriots in 2003 and 2004. It also tied the record for the best start to a season in NFC history that the New Orleans Saints had set in 2009 (although this would be surpassed by the 2015 Carolina Panthers). The only loss for the Packers during the regular season was a Week 15 defeat in Arrowhead Stadium against the Kansas City Chiefs. They also became the first NFC North team to go undefeated in the division since the 1987 Chicago Bears.

Statistics site Football Outsiders calculated that the Packers were, play for play, the best team in the NFL in 2011 (though they received the second-lowest rating for a number 1 team since the 1993 San Francisco 49ers). According to the site, the Packers' offense was historically prolific, ranking as the second-best pass offense and third-best total offense since they began calculating. Furthermore, quarterback Aaron Rodgers had the fourth-most-prolific season, play by play, since calculations began and some have called it one of the most efficient seasons ever by a quarterback by setting the NFL record for highest passer rating in a season (122.5). The 2011 Packers are one of only five teams in NFL history to score 35 points or more nine times in a single season and one of only two teams to score 42 points or more in at least six games, the other being the 2013 Denver Broncos. The Packers' 70 total touchdowns is currently tied with the 1984 Miami Dolphins for the fourth-most touchdowns scored in a season, and their 51 total touchdown passes are tied with the 2004 Indianapolis Colts for second-most touchdown passes in a season. Conversely, the defense was ranked last (32nd) in the league in yards allowed and surrendered an NFL record 4,796 passing yards despite leading the league in interceptions, with 31.

With their offense, their 15–1 record, and their having home field advantage throughout the NFC playoffs for the first time since their Super Bowl XXXI win 15 years earlier, the Packers were aiming to repeat as Super Bowl champions and become the first team to win back to back titles since the New England Patriots in 2003 and 2004 and the first NFC team to win back to back since their rival, the Dallas Cowboys, in 1992 and 1993. However, the Packers instead became the first team to finish with at least 15 victories and not win a playoff game (a feat that was later matched by their divisional rival, the Detroit Lions, in 2024), as they were beaten in a shocking upset by the eventual Super Bowl champion, the New York Giants (who comparatively had a record of 9–7) by a score of 37–20 at Lambeau Field during the Divisional round of the playoffs. The Packers became just the sixth team to win 15 games in the regular season, joining the 1984 San Francisco 49ers, 1985 Chicago Bears, 1998 Minnesota Vikings, 2004 Pittsburgh Steelers and the 2007 New England Patriots, who finished the regular season undefeated at 16–0. The Packers became the fourth consecutive team with at least fifteen victories to fail to win the Super Bowl.

The 2011 Packers were ranked as the 67th greatest NFL team of all time by the NFL on its 100 Greatest Teams list in 2019.

== Offseason ==
=== Free agents ===
Position	Player	Free agency tag	Date signed	2011 team
RB	Brandon Jackson	UFA	28 July	Cleveland Browns
FB	Korey Hall	UFA	29 July	New Orleans Saints
FB	John Kuhn	UFA	31 July	Green Bay Packers
WR	James Jones	UFA	31 July	Green Bay Packers
WR	Brett Swain	ERFA	30 July	Green Bay Packers
G	Daryn Colledge	UFA	28 July	Arizona Cardinals
G	Jason Spitz	UFA	28 July	Jacksonville Jaguars
DE	Cullen Jenkins	UFA	30 July	Philadelphia Eagles
SS	Charlie Peprah	UFA	5 March	Green Bay Packers
SS	Atari Bigby	UFA	16 August	Seattle Seahawks
K	Mason Crosby	UFA	27 July	Green Bay Packers
RFA: Restricted free agent, UFA: Unrestricted free agent, ERFA: Exclusive rights free agent, FT: Franchise Tag

=== Additions ===
- On July 29, LB Elijah Joseph and NT Chris Donaldson were signed to contract as undrafted free agents.
- On August 3, LB K.C. Asiodu was signed to a contract.
- On September 4, QB Graham Harrell, RB Brandon Saine, WR Diondre Borel, WR Chastin West, G Ray Dominguez, CB Brandian Ross, C Sampson Genus and WR Tori Gurley were signed to the practice squad a day after they were all cut from the active roster and cleared waivers.

=== Departures ===
- On March 2, ILB A. J. Hawk, TE Donald Lee and S Derrick Martin were released. Hawk was re-signed the following day.
- On July 27, ILB Nick Barnett, ILB Brandon Chillar, DE Justin Harrell, OLB Brady Poppinga and OT Mark Tauscher were released. S Michael Greco and OLB Curtis Young were waived.
- On August 15, OLB Diyral Briggs was released.
- On August 28, TE Spencer Havner, WR Brett Swain, and T Theo Sherman were released.
- On August 30, WR Antonio Robinson, ILB KC Asiodu, and G Adrian Battles were released.
- On September 3, WR Diondre Borel, S Anthony Bratton, OT Chris Campbell, G Ray Dominguez, NT Chris Donaldson, WR Tori Gurley, S Anthony Levine, LB Ricky Elmore, C Sampson Genus, CB Josh Gordy, QB Graham Harrell, FB Jon Hoese, ILB Cardia Jackson, DE Eli Joseph, ILB Elijah Joseph, C Nick McDonald, RB Dimitri Nance, CB Brandian Ross, NT Jay Ross, RB Brandon Saine, WR Kerry Taylor, WR Chastin West, and CB Brandon Underwood were released.
- On September 3, FB Quinn Johnson was traded to the Tennessee Titans for an undisclosed draft pick.
- On September 3, G Caleb Schlauderaff was traded to the New York Jets for an undisclosed draft pick.

=== Training camp and preseason injuries ===
- On September 3, DE Lawrence Guy and WR Shaky Smithson were placed on injured reserve.

=== Coaching changes ===
- On February 11, Wide receivers coach Jimmy Robinson was signed by the Dallas Cowboys to become their Assistant head coach and wide receivers coach.
- On February 21, Assistant strength and conditioning coach Dave Redding retired.
- On February 22, Zac Woodfin was named Assistant strength and conditioning coach.
- On February 25, Running backs coach Edgar Bennett was moved to Wide receiver coach, Offensive line assistant Jerry Fontenot was promoted to Running backs coach, offensive quality control coach John Rushing was promoted to a combined role of assistant wide receivers coach-special teams coach and hired Joel Hilgenberg as offensive quality control coach.

=== 2011 NFL draft ===
After finishing the 2010 regular season with a 10–6 record, the Packers went 4–0 in the postseason en route to winning Super Bowl XLV. As a result, the Packers received the final selection (32nd) in the first round of the 2011 NFL draft.

2011 Green Bay Packers draft
Round	Pick	Player	Position	College	Notes
1	32	Derek Sherrod	Offensive tackle	Mississippi State	
2	64	Randall Cobb *	Wide receiver	Kentucky	
3	96	Alex Green	Running back	Hawaii	
4	131	Davon House	Cornerback	New Mexico State	
5	141	DJ Williams	Tight end	Arkansas	Pick acquired from SF through DEN
6	179	Caleb Schlauderaff	Guard	Utah	traded to NYJ for an undisclosed draft pick
6	186	DJ Smith	Inside Linebacker	Appalachian State	Pick acquired from PHI through DET & DEN
6	197	Ricky Elmore	Outside linebacker	Arizona	
7	218	Ryan Taylor	Tight end	North Carolina	
7	233	Lawrence Guy	Defensive end	Arizona State	
Made roster * Made at least one Pro Bowl during career

=== Undrafted free agents ===
Name	Position	College
Diondre Borel	Wide receiver	Utah State
Anthony Bratton	Safety	Delaware
Ray Dominguez	Guard	Arkansas
Sampson Genus	Center	South Florida
Tori Gurley	Wide receiver	South Carolina
Jon Hoese	Fullback	Minnesota
M.D. Jennings	Safety	Arkansas State
Elijah Joseph	Linebacker	Temple
Jamari Lattimore	Linebacker	Middle Tennessee
Brandian Ross	Cornerback	Youngstown State
Brandon Saine	Running back	Ohio State
Theo Sherman	Tackle	James Madison
Shaky Smithson	Wide receiver	Utah
Vic So'oto	Linebacker	BYU
Kerry Taylor	Wide receiver	Arizona State

== Coaching staff ==
Green Bay Packers 2011 staff
Front office: Executive committee – board of directors; President/CEO – Mark Murphy; Executive vice president/general manager/director of football operations – Ted Thompson; Vice president of football administration/player finance – Russ Ball; Director of college scouting – John Dorsey; Assistant director of college scouting – Shaun Herock; Assistant director of pro personnel – Eliot Wolf; Assistant director of pro personnel – Tim Terry; Head coaches: Head coach – Mike McCarthy; Assistant head coach/inside linebackers – Winston Moss; Offensive coaches: Offensive coordinator – Joe Philbin; Quarterbacks – Tom Clements; Running backs – Jerry Fontenot; Wide receivers – Edgar Bennett; Assistant wide receivers/special teams – John Rushing; Tight ends – Ben McAdoo; Offensive line – James Campen; Offensive quality control – Joel Hilgenberg	Defensive coaches: Defensive coordinator – Dom Capers; Defensive line – Mike Trgovac; Outside linebackers – Kevin Greene; Secondary – Cornerbacks – Joe Whitt Jr.; Secondary – Safeties – Darren Perry; Defensive quality control – Scott McCurley; Special teams coaches: Special teams coordinator – Shawn Slocum; Special teams assistant – Chad Morton; Strength and conditioning: Strength and conditioning coordinator – Mark Lovat; Strength and conditioning assistant – Thadeus Jackson; Strength and conditioning assistant – Zac Woodfin

== Final roster ==
2011 Green Bay Packers roster
Quarterbacks (QB): 10 Matt Flynn; 6 Graham Harrell; 12 Aaron Rodgers; Running backs (RB): 25 Ryan Grant; 30 John Kuhn FB; 33 Brandon Saine; 44 James Starks; Wide receivers (WR): 18 Randall Cobb; 80 Donald Driver; 85 Greg Jennings; 89 James Jones; 87 Jordy Nelson; Tight ends (TE): 83 Tom Crabtree; 88 Jermichael Finley; 82 Ryan Taylor; 84 D. J. Williams	Offensive linemen (OL): 75 Bryan Bulaga RT; 76 Chad Clifton LT; 70 T. J. Lang G; 74 Marshall Newhouse LT; 63 Scott Wells C; 71 Josh Sitton G; 62 Evan Dietrich-Smith C; 73 Ray Dominguez G; 72 Herb Taylor RT; Defensive linemen (DL): 95 Howard Green NT; 96 Mike Neal DE; 79 Ryan Pickett DE; 90 B. J. Raji NT; 98 C. J. Wilson DE; 94 Jarius Wynn DE	Linebackers (LB): 55 Desmond Bishop ILB; 49 Robert Francois ILB; 50 A. J. Hawk ILB; 59 Brad Jones OLB; 57 Jamari Lattimore OLB; 52 Clay Matthews OLB; 51 D. J. Smith ILB; 97 Vic So'oto OLB; 93 Erik Walden OLB; 58 Frank Zombo OLB; Defensive backs (DB): 42 Morgan Burnett SS; 24 Jarrett Bush CB; 31 Davon House CB; 43 M. D. Jennings FS; 22 Pat Lee CB; 26 Charlie Peprah SS; 37 Sam Shields CB; 38 Tramon Williams CB; 21 Charles Woodson CB; Special teams (ST): 2 Mason Crosby K; 61 Brett Goode LS; 8 Tim Masthay P	Practice squad: 19 Diondre Borel WR; 69 Chris Campbell RT; 56 Sampson Genus C; 86 Tori Gurley WR; 35 Jon Hoese FB; 64 Johnny Jones NT; 34 Anthony Levine S; 39 Brandian Ross CB; 11 Chastin West WR; Reserve: 36 Nick Collins FS (IR); 20 Alex Green RB (IR); -- Johnny Jolly DE (Susp.); 81 Andrew Quarless TE (IR); 78 Derek Sherrod RT (PUP); Rookies in italics 53 active, 5 reserve, 9 practice squad

== Regular season ==
=== Regular season transactions ===
- On September 20, WR Chastin West was signed off the practice squad by the Jacksonville Jaguars.
- On September 21, DE Johnny Jones was signed to the practice squad.
- On October 12, G Ray Dominguez was signed to the active roster from the practice squad and S Nick Collins was placed on injured reserve.
- On October 13, C Cecil Newton was signed to the practice squad.
- On October 31, RB Brandon Saine was signed to the active roster from the practice squad, RB Alex Green was placed on injured reserve, C Cecil Newton was released from the practice squad, and S Anthony Levine and C Paul Fenaroli were signed to the practice squad.
- On November 8, OT Chris Campbell was signed to the practice squad and C Paul Fenaroli was released from the practice squad.
- On December 7, QB Graham Harrell was signed to the active roster from the practice squad, TE Andrew Quarless was placed on injured reserve, and G Jake Vermiglio was signed to the practice squad.
- On December 15, FB Jon Hoese was signed to the practice squad and G Jake Vermiglio was released from the practice squad.
- On December 22, OT Herb Taylor was signed and OT Derek Sherrod was placed on injured reserve.

=== Starters on offense ===
POS	Name	GS	Name	GS	Name	GS
QB	Aaron Rodgers	15	Matt Flynn	1		
RB	Ryan Grant	14	James Starks	2		
FB	John Kuhn	16				
WR	Donald Driver	15	Jordy Nelson	1		
WR	Greg Jennings	13	Jordy Nelson	3		
TE	Jermichael Finley	16				
LT	Marshall Newhouse	9	Chad Clifton	6	T. J. Lang	1
LG	T. J. Lang	15	Evan Dietrich-Smith	1		
C	Scott Wells	16				
RG	Josh Sitton	14	Evan Dietrich-Smith	2		
RT	Bryan Bulaga	12	Marshall Newhouse	4		

=== Starters on defense and special teams ===
POS	Name	GS	Name	GS	Name	GS	Name	GS
LDE	Ryan Pickett	14	C. J. Wilson	2				
NT	B. J. Raji	16						
RDE	Jarius Wynn	15	Howard Green	1				
LOLB	Clay Matthews	15	Vic So'oto	1				
MLB	Desmond Bishop	13	Robert Francois	2	D. J. Smith	1		
MLB	A. J. Hawk	14	D. J. Smith	2				
ROLB	Erik Walden	16						
RCB	Tramon Williams	14	Sam Shields	2				
LCB	Charles Woodson	15	Sam Shields	1				
SS	Morgan Burnett	16						
FS	Charlie Peprah	14	Nick Collins	2				
K	Mason Crosby	16						
P	Tim Masthay	16						

== Schedule ==
=== Preseason ===
Week	Date	Opponent	Result	Record	Game site	NFL.com recap
1	August 13	at Cleveland Browns	**L** 17–27	0–1	Cleveland Browns Stadium	Recap
2	August 19	Arizona Cardinals	**W** 28–20	1–1	Lambeau Field	Recap
3	August 26	at Indianapolis Colts	**W** 24–21	2–1	Lucas Oil Stadium	Recap
4	September 1	Kansas City Chiefs	**W** 20–19	3–1	Lambeau Field	Recap

=== Regular season ===
Week	Date	Opponent	Result	Record	Venue	Attendance
1	September 8	New Orleans Saints	**W** 42–34	1–0	Lambeau Field	Recap
2	September 18	at Carolina Panthers	**W** 30–23	2–0	Bank of America Stadium	Recap
3	September 25	at **Chicago Bears**	**W** 27–17	3–0	Soldier Field	Recap
4	October 2	Denver Broncos	**W** 49–23	4–0	Lambeau Field	Recap
5	October 9	at Atlanta Falcons	**W** 25–14	5–0	Georgia Dome	Recap
6	October 16	St. Louis Rams	**W** 24–3	6–0	Lambeau Field	Recap
7	October 23	at **Minnesota Vikings**	**W** 33–27	7–0	Mall of America Field	Recap
8	Bye					
9	November 6	at San Diego Chargers	**W** 45–38	8–0	Qualcomm Stadium	Recap
10	November 14	**Minnesota Vikings**	**W** 45–7	9–0	Lambeau Field	Recap
11	November 20	Tampa Bay Buccaneers	**W** 35–26	10–0	Lambeau Field	Recap
12	November 24	at **Detroit Lions**	**W** 27–15	11–0	Ford Field	Recap
13	December 4	at New York Giants	**W** 38–35	12–0	MetLife Stadium	Recap
14	December 11	Oakland Raiders	**W** 46–16	13–0	Lambeau Field	Recap
15	December 18	at Kansas City Chiefs	**L** 14–19	13–1	Arrowhead Stadium	Recap
16	December 25	**Chicago Bears**	**W** 35–21	14–1	Lambeau Field	Recap
17	January 1, 2012	**Detroit Lions**	**W** 45–41	15–1	Lambeau Field	Recap

Note: Intra-division opponents are in bold text.

=== Postseason ===
Playoff round	Date	Opponent (seed)	Result	Record	Game site	NFL.com recap
Wild Card	First-round bye					
Divisional	January 15	New York Giants (4)	**L** 20–37	0–1	Lambeau Field	Recap

== Standings ==
NFC North
	W	L	T	PCT	DIV	CONF	PF	PA	STK
^{(1)} Green Bay Packers	15	1	0	.938	6–0	12–0	560	359	W2
^{(6)} Detroit Lions	10	6	0	.625	3–3	6–6	474	387	L1
Chicago Bears	8	8	0	.500	3–3	7–5	353	341	W1
Minnesota Vikings	3	13	0	.188	0–6	3–9	340	449	L1

== Regular season results ==
=== Week 1: vs. New Orleans Saints ===
NFL Kickoff game

Week One: New Orleans Saints at Green Bay Packers – Game summary

Quarter	1	2	3	4	Total
Saints	7	10	10	7	34
Packers	21	7	7	7	42

at Lambeau Field, Green Bay, Wisconsin

- Date: September 8
- Game time: 7:30 p.m. CDT
- Game weather: 68° F, Clear
- Game attendance: 70,555
- Referee: Clete Blakeman
- TV announcers (NBC): Al Michaels, Cris Collinsworth and Michele Tafoya
- Gamebook

Game information

First quarter

- GB – Greg Jennings 7 yd. TD pass from Aaron Rodgers, Mason Crosby XP good, 10:08 (GB 7–0)
- GB – Jordy Nelson 7 yd. TD pass from Aaron Rodgers, Mason Crosby XP good, 6:24 (GB 14–0)
- NO – Robert Meachem 31 yd. TD pass from Drew Brees, John Kasay XP good, 3:31 (GB 14–7)
- GB – Randall Cobb 32 yd. TD pass from Aaron Rodgers, Mason Crosby XP good, 0:11 (GB 21–7)

Second quarter

- NO – John Kasay 30 yd. FG, 9:44 (GB 21–10)
- NO – Darren Sproles 72 yd. punt return TD, John Kasay XP good, 8:37 (GB 21–17)
- GB – James Starks 17 yd. TD run, Mason Crosby XP good, 1:59 (GB 28–17)

Third quarter

- NO – John Kasay 38 yd. FG, 8:40 (GB 28–20)
- GB – Randall Cobb 108 yd. kick return TD, Mason Crosby XP good, 8:26 (GB 35–20)
- NO – Devery Henderson 29 yd. TD pass from Drew Brees, John Kasay XP good, 6:54 (GB 35–27)

Fourth quarter

- GB – John Kuhn 1 yd. TD run, Mason Crosby XP good, 11:50 (GB 42–27)
- NO – Jimmy Graham 5 yd. TD pass from Drew Brees, John Kasay XP good, 2:15 (GB 42–34)

Top passers

- NO – Drew Brees – 32/49, 419 yards, 3 TD
- GB – Aaron Rodgers – 27/35, 312 yards, 3 TD

Top rushers

- NO – Mark Ingram II – 13 rushes, 40 yards
- GB – James Starks – 12 rushes, 57 yards, 1 TD

Top receivers

- NO – Lance Moore – 6 receptions, 100 yards, 1 TD
- GB – Greg Jennings – 7 receptions, 89 yards, 1 TD

Top tacklers

- NO – Roman Harper – 9 tackles
- GB – Morgan Burnett – 14 tackles

With their Super Bowl XLV championship title to defend, the Green Bay Packers began their 2011 campaign against the previous champion (Super Bowl XLIV champion), the New Orleans Saints in the annual NFL Kickoff Game. Green Bay delivered the game's opening punch in the first quarter as reigning Super Bowl MVP Aaron Rodgers found wide receiver Greg Jennings on a 7-yard touchdown pass, followed by wide receiver Jordy Nelson on a 3-yard touchdown pass. The Saints answered with quarterback Drew Brees completing a 31-yard touchdown pass to wide receiver Robert Meachem, yet the Packers came right back with Rodgers hooking up rookie wide receiver Randall Cobb on a 32-yard touchdown pass. It was Cobb's first career catch as well as touchdown, despite running the wrong route, later revealed by Rodgers. New Orleans crawled their way back in the second quarter as kicker John Kasay got a 30-yard field goal, followed by running back Darren Sproles returning a punt 72 yards for a touchdown. Afterwards, Green Bay struck back with a 17-yard touchdown run from running back James Starks.

The Saints led off the third quarter with Kasay making a 38-yard field goal, yet the Packers' dominating night continued with Cobb returning a kickoff 108 yards for a touchdown. It set a then NFL record for the longest touchdown in NFL history. However, New Orleans continued to hang around with Brees completing a 29-yard touchdown pass to wide receiver Devery Henderson. In the fourth quarter, Green Bay kept imposing their will with a 1-yard touchdown run from fullback John Kuhn. The Saints tried to rally as Brees completed a 5-yard touchdown pass to tight end Jimmy Graham, yet the Packers' defense held on with a goal line stand as time expired to preserve the victory. Aaron Rodgers finished the game completing 27 of 35 pass attempts for 312 yards, 3 touchdown passes, no interceptions, and a passer rating of 132.1.

With the win, Green Bay began their season 1–0 while New Orleans dropped to 0–1 to start their season.

=== Week 2: at Carolina Panthers ===
Week Two: Green Bay Packers at Carolina Panthers – Game summary

Quarter	1	2	3	4	Total
Packers	0	7	16	7	30
Panthers	10	3	0	10	23

at Bank of America Stadium, Charlotte, North Carolina

- Date: September 18
- Game time: 1:00 p.m EDT/12:00 pm. CDT
- Game weather: 64 °F (18 °C), Cloudy
- Game attendance: 73,167
- Referee: Alberto Riveron
- TV announcers (Fox): Ron Pitts and Jim Mora, Jr.
- Gamebook

Game information

First quarter

- CAR – Brandon LaFell 49 yd. TD pass from Cam Newton, Olindo Mare XP good, 9:20 (CAR 7–0)
- CAR – Olindo Mare 20 yd. FG, 6:32 (CAR 10–0)

Second quarter

- CAR – Olindo Mare 33 yd. FG, 14:48 (CAR 13–0)
- GB – John Kuhn 1 yd. TD run, Mason Crosby XP good, 9:58 (CAR 13–7)

Third quarter

- GB – Greg Jennings 49 yd. TD pass from Aaron Rodgers, Mason Crosby XP good, 12:23 (GB 14–13)
- GB – Mason Crosby 37 yd. FG, 10:22 (GB 17–13)
- GB – Mason Crosby 19 yd. FG, 5:43 (GB 20–13)
- GB – Mason Crosby 34 yd. FG, 0:57 (GB 23–13)

Fourth quarter

- CAR – Olindo Mare 21 yd. FG, 10:05 (GB 23–16)
- GB – Jordy Nelson 84 yd. TD pass from Aaron Rodgers, Mason Crosby XP good, 2:14 (GB 30–16)
- CAR – Cam Newton 4 yd. TD run, Olindo Mare XP good, 0:37 (GB 30–23)

Top passers

- GB – Aaron Rodgers – 19/30, 308 yards, 2 TD
- CAR – Cam Newton – 28/46, 432 yards, 1 TD, 3 INT

Top rushers

- GB – James Starks – 9 rushes, 85 yards
- CAR – Cam Newton – 10 rushes, 53 yards

Top receivers

- GB – Jordy Nelson – 1 reception, 84 yards, TD
- CAR – Steve Smith – 6 receptions, 156 yards

Top tacklers

- GB – Desmond Bishop – 10 tackles
- CAR – James Anderson – 9 tackles

The Green Bay Packers hung on to beat the Carolina Panthers, 30–23, in front of 73,167 at Bank of America Stadium in Charlotte, NC. QB Aaron Rodgers completed 19 of 30 passes for 308 yards and 2 touchdowns, FB John Kuhn rushed for another, and K Mason Crosby converted 3 of 3 field goals (37, 19, 34) in the win for the Packers. The Packers improved to 2–0 on the season in their quest to repeat as Super Bowl Champions. During the win three-time Pro Bowl FS Nick Collins was lost for the season with a neck injury.

Panthers QB Cam Newton threw for 432 yards and a touchdown, and rushed for a score in his second career NFL start. Newton was also intercepted 3 times on the day, 2 times by Packers CB Charles Woodson (who also recovered a fumble for Green Bay defensively). Carolina fell to 0–2 on the season.

=== Week 3: at Chicago Bears ===
Week Three: Green Bay Packers at Chicago Bears – Game summary

Quarter	1	2	3	4	Total
Packers	7	10	3	7	27
Bears	0	10	0	7	17

at Soldier Field, Chicago, Illinois

- Date: September 25
- Game time: 3:15 p.m CDT
- Game weather: 61 °F (16 °C), Mostly Cloudy
- Game attendance: 62,339
- Referee: Mike Carey
- TV announcers (Fox): Joe Buck, Troy Aikman and Pam Oliver
- Gamebook

Game information

First quarter

- GB – Jermichael Finley 6 yd. TD pass from Aaron Rodgers, Mason Crosby XP good, 11:25 (GB 7–0)

Second quarter

- GB – Jermichael Finley 7 yd. TD pass from Aaron Rodgers, Mason Crosby XP good, 12:00 (GB 14–0)
- CHI – Dane Sanzenbacher 4 yd. TD pass from Jay Cutler, Robbie Gould XP good, 8:12 (GB 14–7)
- GB – Mason Crosby 37 yd. FG, 1:51 (GB 17–7)
- CHI – Robbie Gould 25 yd. FG, 0:49 (GB 17–10)

Third quarter

- GB – Mason Crosby 28 yd. FG, 6:32 (GB 20–10)

Fourth quarter

- GB – Jermichael Finley 10 yd. TD pass from Aaron Rodgers, Mason Crosby XP good, 12:49 (GB 27–10)
- CHI – Kellen Davis 32 yd. TD pass from Jay Cutler, Robbie Gould XP good, 11:46 (GB 27–17)

Top passers

- GB – Aaron Rodgers – 28/38, 297 yards, 3 TD, 1 INT
- CHI – Jay Cutler – 21/37, 302 yards, 2 TD, 2 INT

Top rushers

- GB – Ryan Grant – 17 rushes, 92 yards
- CHI – Jay Cutler – 3 rushes, 11 yards

Top receivers

- GB – Greg Jennings – 9 receptions, 119 yards
- CHI – Johnny Knox – 4 receptions, 84 yards

Top tacklers

- GB – Morgan Burnett – 6 tackles
- CHI – Lance Briggs – 14 tackles

The Green Bay Packers and Chicago Bears met at Soldier Field for the first time since the 2010 NFC Championship Game earlier this year, when the Packers defeated the Bears 21–14, which allowed Green Bay to advance to and eventually win Super Bowl XLV. This game was much of the same as the defending Super Bowl Champions went into Chicago and left with another 'W', this time 27–17. Packers QB Aaron Rodgers connected with TE Jermichael Finley 3 times on touchdown completions of 6, 7, & 10 yards. Rodgers was crisp and efficient, improving to 6–2 against Chicago in his career. He finished the day completing 28 of 38 passes for 297 yards, 3 touchdowns and an interception. Rodgers leads the NFL in passer rating (120.9) and completion percentage (71.8%) through the first three weeks of the 2011 NFL season. WR Greg Jennings had a solid effort, hauling in a career-high 9 receptions for 119 yards and the aforementioned Finley caught 7 passes for 85 yards to go along with his 3 touchdowns. RB Ryan Grant showed flashes of his 2009 form prior to a season-ending ankle injury in 2010. He rushed the ball 17 times for 92 yards, a 5.4 per carry average. For Chicago, QB Jay Cutler had another up and down game against Green Bay. He completed 21 of 37 passes for 302 yards and 2 touchdowns, but threw 2 costly interceptions to Packers SS Morgan Burnett. Bears standout RB Matt Forte was held in check all day as he was only able to gain 2 yards on 9 carries.

Green Bay remained undefeated at 3–0 with the win. With the loss, Chicago dropped to 1–2 on the early season and 2 games behind both division leaders, Green Bay and Detroit.

=== Week 4: vs. Denver Broncos ===
Week Four: Denver Broncos at Green Bay Packers – Game summary

Quarter	1	2	3	4	Total
Broncos	3	14	0	6	23
Packers	14	14	14	7	49

at Lambeau Field, Green Bay, Wisconsin

- Date: October 2
- Game time: 3:15 pm. CDT
- Game weather: 67 °F (19 °C), Sunny
- Game attendance: 70,529
- Referee: Scott Green
- TV announcers (CBS): Jim Nantz and Phil Simms
- Gamebook

Game information

First quarter

- DEN – Matt Prater 27-yard FG, 5:22 (DEN 3–0)
- GB – Jordy Nelson 50-yard touchdown pass from Aaron Rodgers, Mason Crosby XP is good, 2:08 (GB 7–3)
- GB – Charles Woodson 30-yard interception return for a touchdown, Mason Crosby XP is good, 0:50 (GB 14–3)

Second quarter

- GB – Aaron Rodgers 11-yard touchdown run, Mason Crosby XP is good, 12:18 (GB 21–3)
- DEN – Eric Decker 5-yard touchdown pass from Kyle Orton, Matt Prater XP is good, 10:27 (GB 21–10)
- DEN – Eric Decker 33-yard touchdown pass from Kyle Orton, Matt Prater XP is good, 3:24 (GB 21–17)
- GB – Greg Jennings 17-yard touchdown pass from Aaron Rodgers, Mason Crosby XP is good, 0:21 (GB 28–17)

Third quarter

- GB – Aaron Rodgers 8-yard touchdown run, Mason Crosby XP is good, 8:26 (GB 35–17)
- GB – James Jones 16-yard touchdown pass from Aaron Rodgers, Mason Crosby XP is good, 1:12 (GB 42–17)

Fourth quarter

- GB – Donald Driver 8-yard touchdown pass from Aaron Rodgers, Mason Crosby XP is good, 7:46 (GB 49–17)
- DEN – Daniel Fells 7-yard touchdown pass from Kyle Orton, 2-point conversion attempt failed, 3:02 (GB 49–23)

Top passers

- DEN – Kyle Orton – 22/32, 273 Yards, 3 TD, 3 INT
- GB – Aaron Rodgers – 29/38, 408 Yards, 4 TD, INT

Top rushers

- DEN – Willis McGahee – 15 Rushes, 103 Yards
- GB – James Starks – 13 Rushes, 63 yards

Top receivers

- DEN – Brandon Lloyd – 8 receptions, 136 yards
- GB – Greg Jennings – 7 receptions, 103 yards, TD

Top tacklers

- DEN – D.J. Williams – 8 tackles
- GB – Desmond Bishop – 10 tackles

The Green Bay Packers returned to Lambeau Field for the first time since their victory in the NFL opening kickoff game on September 8 and continued their early season success by defeating the visiting Denver Broncos, 49–23. The Packers jumped out to an early lead, as they led 21–3 with 12:18 remaining in the 2nd quarter. The Broncos countered with two straight touchdowns to cut the Packer lead to 21–17, but the Packers responded by scoring 28 unanswered points to win in blowout fashion. Packers QB Aaron Rodgers had a career day, completing 29 of 38 (76.3%) passes for a career-high 408 yards. He threw 4 touchdowns (one to each WR Jordy Nelson, WR Greg Jennings, WR James Jones, and WR Donald Driver) and an interception. Rodgers showed his versatility by rushing for scores of 11 and 8 yards as well. He became the only QB in NFL history to record at least 400 yards passing, with 4 touchdown passes, and 2 rushing touchdowns in one game. WR Greg Jennings caught 7 passes for 103 yards to go along with his touchdown and RB James starked added 63 yards rushing and 38 yards receiving. On defense, the Packers forced 4 turnovers (3 INT and 1 FF), most notably an interception by CB Charles Woodson in the first quarter returned 30 yards for a touchdown. Broncos QB Kyle Orton threw for 273 yards, 3 touchdowns, and 3 interceptions in the loss. This was the first-ever regular season game to end with a score of 49 to 23.

The loss dropped Denver to 1–3. They return home to take on AFC West-leading San Diego next Sunday. Green Bay (4–0) remained 1 of 2 unbeaten teams (Detroit) through the first 4 weeks of the 2011 NFL season. The Packers go on the road next week to take on the Atlanta Falcons on primetime, Sunday Night Football. It will be a rematch of an NFC Divisional game from the 2010–11 NFL Playoffs, a game won 48–21 by Green Bay en route to winning Super Bowl XLV.

=== Week 5: at Atlanta Falcons ===
Week Five: Green Bay Packers at Atlanta Falcons – Game summary

Quarter	1	2	3	4	Total
Packers	0	6	9	10	25
Falcons	7	7	0	0	14

at Georgia Dome, Atlanta, Georgia

- Date: October 9
- Game time: 8:20 p.m EDT/7:20 pm. CDT
- Game weather: Played indoors (dome stadium)
- Game attendance: 69,576
- Referee: Jeff Triplette
- TV announcers (NBC): Al Michaels, Cris Collinsworth, and Michele Tafoya
- Gamebook

Game information

First quarter

- ATL – Roddy White, 5 yd TD pass from Matt Ryan, Matt Bryant XP is good, 8:15 (ATL 7–0)

Second quarter

- ATL – Michael Turner 1 yd TD run, Matt Bryant XP is good, 12:26 (ATL 14–0)
- GB – Mason Crosby 32 yd FG, 5:26 (ATL 14–3)
- GB – Mason Crosby 35 yd FG, 0:08 (ATL 14–6)

Third quarter

- GB – Mason Crosby 56 yd FG, 5:28 (ATL 14–9)
- GB – James Jones 70 yd TD pass from Aaron Rodgers, 2-point conversion attempt failed, 3:42 (GB 15–14)

Fourth quarter

- GB – Greg Jennings 29 yd TD pass from Aaron Rodgers, Mason Crosby XP is good, 14:51 (GB 22–14)
- GB – Mason Crosby 30 yd FG, 1:10 (GB 25–14)

Top passers

- GB – Aaron Rodgers – 26/39, 396 yards, 2 TD
- ATL – Matt Ryan – 18/32, 167 yards, 1 TD, 2 INT

Top rushers

- GB – James Starks – 12 rushes, 40 yards
- ATL – Michael Turner – 16 rushes, 56 yards, 1 TD

Top receivers

- GB – James Jones – 5 receptions, 140 yards, 1 TD
- ATL – Tony Gonzalez – 6 receptions, 60 yards

Top tacklers

- GB – Desmond Bishop – 7 tackles, 1 sack
- ATL – Sean Weatherspoon – 11 tackles

The Green Bay Packers beat the Atlanta Falcons, 25–14, in a matchup at the Georgia Dome in Atlanta, GA in the NFL week 5 edition of Sunday Night Football. The Falcons received the opening kickoff and took the ball 80 yards in just under 7 minutes to jump out to an early 7–0 lead on a QB Matt Ryan to WR Roddy White touchdown connection. On the ensuing possession, Green Bay drove into Atlanta territory but Atlanta CB Brent Grimes forced a fumble from Green Bay RB Ryan Grant. The Falcons once again took the ball down the field for a touchdown, this time on a RB Michael Turner 1-yard run, and with just over 12 minutes remaining in the second quarter, Atlanta led 14–0. Green Bay cut the lead to 14–6 at the half on a pair of second-quarter field goals by K Mason Crosby. In the second half it was all about the Green Bay defense which posted a shutout in the final 42 minutes of the game. Midway through the third quarter, Crosby boomed a 56 yarder to cut it to 14–9. Then after a stand by the Packer defense, Packers QB Aaron Rodgers hooked up with WR James Jones on a 70-yard touchdown that put the Packers ahead for good 15–14 (failed 2-pt conv.). On the first play of the fourth quarter Rodgers went to work again and hooked up with WR Greg Jennings on a 29-yard touchdown and Crosby added his fourth field goal with 1:10 remaining to seal it for the visiting Packers.

Green Bay QB Aaron Rodgers completed 26 of 39 passes for 396 yards and 2 TD's to lead the offense and remain the early season favorite for MVP. Atlanta QB Matt Ryan struggled, completing 18 of 32 passes for 167 yards, with a TD and 2 INT (by S Charlie Peprah & CB Jarrett Bush). With the win, Green Bay improved to 5–0 as the defending Super Bowl Champions went to Atlanta and dealt them another defeat at home. This coming off a decisive 48–21 Green Bay victory in last years NFC divisional round, also in Atlanta. The Falcons drop to 2–3 with the loss and host the Carolina Panthers next Sunday. Green Bay returns to Lambeau Field to take on the winless St. Louis Rams.

=== Week 6: vs. St. Louis Rams ===
Week Six: St. Louis Rams at Green Bay Packers – Game summary

Quarter	1	2	3	4	Total
Rams	0	3	0	0	3
Packers	3	21	0	0	24

at Lambeau Field, Green Bay, Wisconsin

- Date: October 16
- Game time: 12:00 pm. CDT
- Game weather: 57 °F (14 °C), Partly Cloudy
- Game attendance: 70,604
- Referee: Ed Hochuli
- TV announcers (Fox): Chris Myers and Tim Ryan
- Gamebook

Game information

First quarter

- GB – Mason Crosby 32 yd FG, 6:57 (GB 3–0)

Second quarter

- GB – James Jones 35 yd TD pass from Aaron Rodgers, Mason Crosby XP is good, 14:00 (GB 10–0)
- GB – Jordy Nelson 93 yd TD pass from Aaron Rodgers, Mason Crosby XP is good, 9:24 (GB 17–0)
- GB – Donald Driver 7 yd TD pass from Aaron Rodgers, Mason Crosby XP is good, 1:56 (GB 24–0)
- STL – Josh Brown 36 yd FG, 00:07 (GB 24–3)

Third quarter

- No scoring plays

Fourth quarter

- No scoring plays

Top passers

- STL – Sam Bradford – 29/45, 328 yards, 1 INT
- GB – Aaron Rodgers – 18/29, 316 yards, 3 TD, 1 INT

Top rushers

- STL – Steven Jackson – 18 rushes, 96 yards
- GB – James Starks – 13 rushes, 49 yards

Top receivers

- STL – Danario Alexander – 6 receptions, 91 yards
- GB – Jordy Nelson – 2 receptions, 104 yards, 1 TD

Top tacklers

- STL – Chris Chamberlain – 6 tackles
- GB – Desmond Bishop – 9 tackles

The Green Bay Packers remained undefeated as they beat the St. Louis Rams, 24–3, in front of 70,604 at Lambeau Field in Green Bay, Wisconsin. All of the scoring took place in the first half. Packers K Mason Crosby kicked off the scoring in the first quarter with 32-yard FG. Then the second quarter was all Green Bay on the right arm of QB Aaron Rodgers. Rodgers connected on TD passes to James Jones (35 yards), Jordy Nelson (93 yards), and Donald Driver (7 yards) to lead Green Bay to a 24–0 lead that they never relinquished. Rams K Josh Brown made a 36-yard FG just seconds before halftime but St. Louis couldn't inch any closer as the second half was highlighted by a defensive struggle on both sides.

Rodgers finished the day with 3 TD and an INT on 18/29 passing for 316 yards. This was Rodgers' fifth 300+ yard game in six contests in 2011. Rams QB Sam Bradford finished with 328 yards passing with an INT but couldn't find the end zone for the winless Rams (0–5). They travel to Dallas next Sunday, still looking for win no. 1 in 2011. Green Bay improves to 6–0 and head to Minnesota for a divisional matchup with the 4th-place Vikings next Sunday. Also with the Lions' loss, the Packers remain the NFL's only undefeated team.

=== Week 7: at Minnesota Vikings ===
Week Seven: Green Bay Packers at Minnesota Vikings – Game summary

Quarter	1	2	3	4	Total
Packers	7	6	20	0	33
Vikings	7	10	0	10	27

at Mall of America Field at Hubert H. Humphrey Metrodome, Minneapolis, Minnesota

- Date: October 23
- Game time: 3:15 p.m CDT
- Game weather: Played indoors (dome stadium)
- Game attendance: 63,946
- Referee: Pete Morelli
- TV announcers (Fox): Thom Brennaman, Troy Aikman and Pam Oliver
- Gamebook

Game information

First quarter

- MIN – Visanthe Shiancoe 2 yd TD pass from Christian Ponder, Ryan Longwell XP is good, 14:04 (MIN 7–0)
- GB – John Kuhn 2 yd TD pass from Aaron Rodgers, Mason Crosby XP is good, 08:39 (7–7)

Second quarter

- MIN – Adrian Peterson 1 yd TD run, Ryan Longwell XP is good, 11:47 (MIN 14–7)
- GB – Mason Crosby 39 yd FG, 04:59 (MIN 14–10)
- MIN – Ryan Longwell 52 yd FG, 01:00 (MIN 17–10)
- GB – Mason Crosby 45 yd FG, 00:05 (MIN 17–13)

Third quarter

- GB – Greg Jennings 79 yd TD pass from Aaron Rodgers, Mason Crosby XP is good, 14:22 (GB 20–17)
- GB – Jermichael Finley 2 yd TD pass from Aaron Rodgers, Mason Crosby XP is good, 10:35 (GB 27–17)
- GB – Mason Crosby 24 yd FG, 03:20 (GB 30–17)
- GB – Mason Crosby 58 yd FG, 00:22 (GB 33–17)

Fourth quarter

- MIN – Ryan Longwell 46 yd FG, 13:53 (GB 33–20)
- MIN – Michael Jenkins 24 yd TD pass from Christian Ponder, Ryan Longwell XP is good, 07:51 (GB 33–27)

Top passers

- GB – Aaron Rodgers – 24/30, 335 yards, 3 TD
- MIN – Christian Ponder – 13/32, 219 yards, 2 TD, 2 INT

Top rushers

- GB – James Starks – 13 rushes, 75 yards
- MIN – Adrian Peterson – 24 rushes, 175 yards, 1 TD

Top receivers

- GB – Greg Jennings – 7 receptions, 147 yards, 1 TD
- MIN – Michael Jenkins – 3 rec, 111 yards, 1 TD

Top tacklers

- GB – Desmond Bishop – 6 tackles 2 Assist
- MIN – Asher Allen – 9 tackles 2 Assist

The Green Bay Packers knocked off division-rival Minnesota, in a hard fought battle at the Metrodome, 33–27. The Vikings turned to rookie QB Christian Ponder to try to turn things around in a move sending veteran QB Donovan McNabb to the bench, who had been struggling the first six games of the season (Minnesota was 1–5 coming in). Minnesota started fast as Ponder threw his first career NFL touchdown pass to Visanthe Shiancoe just 56 seconds into the game. On the ensuing possession, Green Bay QB Aaron Rodgers went right to work and navigated the Packer offense down the field on a touchdown drive that ended on a 2-yard TD pass from Rodgers to FB John Kuhn. Vikings Standout RB Adrian Peterson scored early in the second quarter and had a big day (175 yards on 24 rushes). K Mason Crosby added a pair of field goals for GB, and K Ryan Longwell added one himself and Minnesota headed to the locker room with a 17–13 lead. But the second half was a different story as Green Bay flexed their muscle. On the second play of the third quarter, Rodgers found WR Greg Jennings for a 79-yard TD, and shortly after Rodgers hooked up with TE Jermichael Finley for a 2-yard score. Crosby booted 2 more field goals (one of which for a franchise record 58 yards), which were sandwiched around 2 interceptions by Packers CB Charles Woodson, and GB led 33–17 after three-quarters. Minnesota cut the lead to 33–27 late in the fourth quarter on another Longwell field goal and Ponder to WR Michael Jenkins TD pass, but Green Bay was able to keep the lead and run out the clock with strong running by RB James Starks in the closing minutes.

Rodgers ended the day, completing 24 of 30 passes (including 13 for 13 to start the game), for 335 yards and 3 touchdowns, and now had an incredible league-leading 125.7 passer rating and 20 touchdown passes through the first 7 weeks. The Packers remained the only undefeated team in the NFL at 7–0 heading into their bye week, and would play at San Diego following the bye. Meanwhile, Minnesota fell to 1–6 and headed to Carolina the next Sunday.

=== Week 9: at San Diego Chargers ===
Week Nine: Green Bay Packers at San Diego Chargers – Game summary

Quarter	1	2	3	4	Total
Packers	21	7	3	14	45
Chargers	7	10	7	14	38

at Qualcomm Stadium, San Diego, California

- Date: November 6
- Game time: 1:15 p.m. PST/ 3:15 pm. CST
- Game weather: 53 °F (12 °C), Rain
- Game attendance: 68,908
- Referee: Clete Blakeman
- TV announcers (Fox): Thom Brennaman, Brian Billick, and Laura Okmin
- Gamebook

Game information

First quarter

- SD – Vincent Jackson 23 yd TD pass from Philip Rivers, Nick Novak XP is good, 10:32 (SD 7–0)
- GB – Jermichael Finley 5 yd TD pass from Aaron Rodgers, Mason Crosby XP is good, 5:40 (Tied 7–7)
- GB – Charlie Peprah 40 yd interception return TD, Mason Crosby XP is good, 4:33 (GB 14–7)
- GB – Tramon Williams 43 yd interception return TD, Mason Crosby XP is good, 1:52 (GB 21–7)

Second quarter

- SD – Mike Tolbert 8 yd run, Nick Novak XP is good, 14:08 (GB 21–14)
- SD – Nick Novak 52 yd FG, 5:48 (GB 21–17)
- GB – Jordy Nelson 16 yd TD pass from Aaron Rodgers, Mason Crosby XP is good, 0:18 (GB 28–17)

Third quarter

- GB – Mason Crosby 47 yd FG, 8:25 (GB 31–17)
- SD – Antonio Gates 11 yd TD pass from Philip Rivers, Nick Novak XP is good, 1:58 (GB 31–24)

Fourth quarter

- GB – James Jones 21 yd TD pass from Aaron Rodgers, Mason Crosby XP is good, 13:00 (GB 38–24)
- GB – Greg Jennings 4 yd TD pass from Aaron Rodgers, Mason Crosby XP is good, 10:27 (GB 45–24)
- SD – Vincent Jackson 5 yd TD pass from Philip Rivers, Nick Novak XP is good, 7:32 (GB 45–31)
- SD – Vincent Jackson 29 yd TD pass from Philip Rivers, Nick Novak XP is good, 6:25 (GB 45–38)

Top passers

- GB – Aaron Rodgers – 21/26, 247 yards, 4 TD
- SD – Philip Rivers – 26/46, 385 yards, 4 TD, 3 INT

Top rushers

- GB – James Starks – 13 rushes, 66 yards
- SD – Mike Tolbert – 19 rushes, 83 yards, TD

Top receivers

- GB – Jordy Nelson – 5 receptions, 105 yards, TD
- SD – Vincent Jackson – 7 receptions, 141 yards, 3 TD

Top tacklers

- GB – Desmond Bishop – 11 tackles
- SD – Marcus Gilchrist – 8 tackles

The Green Bay Packers won a shootout with the San Diego Chargers, 45–38, at Qualcomm Stadium in San Diego, CA. San Diego received the opening kickoff and QB Philip Rivers navigated the Chargers down the field and found WR Vincent Jackson for a 23-yard touchdown early in the first quarter. Then Packers QB Aaron Rodgers took the field and did the same finishing the 8 play, 63-yard drive with a 5-yard touchdown pass to TE Jermichael Finley to tie the score 7–7. Then the Green Bay defense went to work. On consecutive drives the Packer defense picked off Rivers and returned it for touchdowns, the first a 40 yarder by SS Charlie Peprah and the latter, a 43 yarder by CB Tramon Williams. In the blink of an eye, it was 21–7 Green Bay. San Diego answered with another touchdown drive of their own completed by RB Michael Tolbert 8-yard run. San Diego K Nick Novak booted a 52-yard FG to cut the GB lead to 4 but Rodgers hooked up with WR Jordy Nelson for a 16-yard score just 18 seconds before halftime and took a 28–17 lead into the locker room. The second half got under way and Green Bay navigated its way down the field and K Mason Crosby converted a 47-yard FG to remain a perfect 15–15 on the season. Rivers threw his second touchdown of the game to TE Antonio Gates late in the third quarter to cut the Packer lead to 31–24. Green Bay appeared to put the game out of reach early in the fourth quarter when Rodgers threw touchdown passes to WR James Jones and WR Greg Jennings, as the Packers led by 21. But San Diego once again stormed back when Jackson caught his second touchdown of the day which was followed by a San Diego onside kick and recovery. San Diego wasted no time as under a minute later Rivers found Jackson for the third time and suddenly it was 45–38 with over six minutes to play. That was the final score as the Packers Charlie Peprah made his second interception to seal the victory for Green Bay.

Rodgers finished the play 21/26 for 247 yards with 4 touchdowns and no interceptions for Green Bay. Rivers finished 26/46 for 385 yards with 4 touchdowns but 3 big interceptions for San Diego. With the win Green Bay improves to 8–0 at the midway of the season and host division rival Minnesota next Monday on Monday Night Football at Lambeau Field. San Diego falls to 4–4 and have a quick turnaround as they host Oakland on Thursday in the 2011 first edition of NFL Network's Thursday Night Football.

=== Week 10: vs. Minnesota Vikings ===
Week Ten: Minnesota Vikings at Green Bay Packers – Game summary

Quarter	1	2	3	4	Total
Vikings	0	0	7	0	7
Packers	14	3	14	14	45

at Lambeau Field, Green Bay, Wisconsin

- Date: November 14
- Game time: 7:30 pm. CST
- Game weather: 47 °F (8 °C), Cloudy
- Game attendance: 70,519
- Referee: Mike Carey
- TV announcers (ESPN): Mike Tirico, Ron Jaworski, Jon Gruden and Rachel Nichols
- Gamebook

Game information

First quarter

- GB – Randall Cobb 80 yd punt return, Mason Crosby XP is good, 13:42 (GB 7–0)
- GB – Greg Jennings 24 yd TD pass from Aaron Rodgers, Mason Crosby XP is good, 5:07 (GB 14–0)

Second quarter

- GB – Mason Crosby 25 yd FG, 12:08 (GB 17–0)

Third quarter

- GB – Jordy Nelson 17 yd TD pass from Aaron Rodgers, Mason Crosby XP is good, 10:52 (GB 24–0)
- MIN – Adrian Peterson 3 yd run, Ryan Longwell XP is good, 8:44 (GB 24–7)
- GB – John Kuhn 9 yd TD pass from Aaron Rodgers, Mason Crosby XP is good, 6:25 (GB 31–7)

Fourth quarter

- GB – Jordy Nelson 4 yd TD pass from Aaron Rodgers, Mason Crosby XP is good, 11:07 (GB 38–7)
- GB – Matt Flynn 3 yd run, Mason Crosby XP is good, 4:33 (GB 45–7)

Top passers

- MIN – Christian Ponder – 16/34, 190 yards, 1 INT
- GB – Aaron Rodgers – 23/30, 250 yards, 4 TD

Top rushers

- MIN – Adrian Peterson – 14 rushes, 51 yards, TD
- GB – James Starks – 13 rushes, 63 yards

Top receivers

- MIN – Percy Harvin – 6 receptions, 52 yards
- GB – Jermichael Finley – 3 receptions, 67 yards

Top tacklers

- MIN – Chad Greenway – 7 tackles
- GB – Charles Woodson – 8 tackles

The Packers stayed undefeated after a crushing victory over the Vikings. Just 1:18 into the game Randall Cobb managed to make a punt-return TD over 80 yards to give the Packers the lead. The Vikings managed just 1 first down before the Packers defense forced them into another punt, Aaron Rodgers took advantage of it and the lead went up to 14. 1:18 before the end of the first quarter the Vikings kicker Ryan Longwell missed a 52-yd field goal. The second quarter started the way the first went with a Packers score, Mason Crosby connected on a 25-yd FG. No more scoring happened in this half, Tramon Williams successfully intercepted a pass by Ponder, making it only the second highlight that quarter. The Vikings were shut down by the Packers defense by managing not to score the whole first half. At the start of the third quarter Rodgers found Jordy Nelson for a 17-yd TD pass to push the lead to 24–0. Later on, Adrian Peterson scored a TD after a 3-yd run to give Minnesota the only points in the game. The rest of the way was a one-sided affair, with the Packers scoring another three touchdowns. John Kuhn and Nelson for the second time gave Rodgers two more TD passes in this game. Rodgers watched the last 10:30 of the game from the bench, looking at his backup Matt Flynn, who did score a 3-yd run TD 4:33 before the end of the game.

With this win the Packers went to 9–0 sweeping the Vikings in the season and dropping the Vikings to 2–7. Rodgers again had a good passing game with connecting on 23 of his 30 pass attempts. Nelson was next to Rodgers the player of the game with his two touchdowns. The Packers will now play home to the Tampa Bay Buccaneers, while the Vikings play at home against Oakland.

=== Week 11: vs. Tampa Bay Buccaneers ===
Week Eleven: Tampa Bay Buccaneers at Green Bay Packers – Game summary

Quarter	1	2	3	4	Total
Buccaneers	0	10	3	13	26
Packers	7	14	0	14	35

at Lambeau Field, Green Bay, Wisconsin

- Date: November 20
- Game time: 12:00 pm. CST/1:00 p.m. EST
- Game weather: 32 °F (0 °C), Cloudy
- Game attendance: 70,498
- Referee: Alberto Riveron
- TV announcers (Fox): Joe Buck, Troy Aikman and Pam Oliver
- Gamebook

Game information

First quarter

- GB – B. J. Raji 3 yd run, Mason Crosby XP is good, 3:08 (GB 7–0)

Second quarter

- GB – Tom Crabtree 5 yd TD pass from Aaron Rodgers, Mason Crosby XP is good, 14:48 (GB 14–0)
- TB – LeGarrette Blount 54 yd run, Connor Barth XP is good, 13:00 (GB 14–7)
- TB – Connor Barth 23-yard FG is good, 3:55 (GB 14–10)
- GB – Jordy Nelson 5 yd TD pass from Aaron Rodgers, Mason Crosby XP is good, 2:02 (GB 21–10)

Third quarter

- TB – Connor Barth 32-yard FG is good, 4:57 (GB 21–13)

Fourth quarter

- TB – Mike Williams 9 yd TD pass from Josh Freeman, 2-pt conversion is not good, 13:11 (GB 21–19)
- GB – John Kuhn 2 yd run, Mason Crosby XP is good, 7:46 (GB 28–19)
- TB – Dezmon Briscoe 2 yd TD pass from Josh Freeman, Connor Barth XP is good, 4:31 (GB 28–26)
- GB – Jordy Nelson 40 yd TD pass from Aaron Rodgers, Mason Crosby XP is good, 3:01 (GB 35–26)

Top passers

- TB – Josh Freeman – 28/38, 342 yards, 2 TD, 2 INT
- GB – Aaron Rodgers – 23/34, 299 yards, 3 TD, 1 INT

Top rushers

- TB – LeGarrette Blount – 18 rushes, 107 yards, TD
- GB – James Starks – 11 rushes, 38 yards

Top receivers

- TB – Kellen Winslow II – 9 receptions, 132 yards
- GB – Jordy Nelson – 6 receptions, 123 yards, 2 TD

Top tacklers

- TB – Quincy Black – 7 tackles
- GB – Desmond Bishop – 7 tackles

The Packers took on the Buccaneers and managed to get the 10th victory of the season. B. J. Raji opened the scoring three minutes before the end of the first quarter, Mason Crosby completed the XP to give the Packers the 7–0 lead after one. Tom Crabtree received a 5-yd TD pass from Aaron Rodgers that blew the lead to 14, before LeGarrette Blount ran 54 yards to slice the lead to seven. Later on Connor Barth successfully connected on a 23-yd FG and the lead was just four, but two minutes before the end of the half Jordy Nelson got a 5-yd pass for a TD and the lead at the half was 21–10. The third quarter was less action and scoring, only Barth hit a 32-yd FG to make it an eight-point game. Mike Williams made it even a two-point game with an early TD in the fourth, but Tampa Bay tried a two-point conversion to tie the game, but Kellen Winslow II dropped the ball after he originally caught it. Tampa had three penalties of Pass interferences in a short time of period and the whole momentum went back to the Packers and John Kuhn made a 2-yd run for a TD. Tampa were not done yet, 4:31 before the end, Dezmon Briscoe closed the lead once again to two. But Nelson decided the game with his second touchdown of the evening.

=== Week 12: at Detroit Lions ===
Thanksgiving Day game

Week Twelve: Green Bay Packers at Detroit Lions – Game summary

Quarter	1	2	3	4	Total
Packers	0	7	17	3	27
Lions	0	0	0	15	15

at Ford Field, Detroit, Michigan

- Date: November 24
- Game time: 12:30 pm. EST/11:30 am. CST
- Game weather: Played indoors (domed stadium)
- Game attendance: 66,263
- Referee: Terry McAulay
- TV announcers (Fox): Joe Buck, Troy Aikman, & Pam Oliver
- Gamebook

Game information

First quarter

- No scoring plays

Second quarter

- GB – Greg Jennings 3 yd TD pass from Aaron Rodgers, Mason Crosby XP is good, 4:54 (GB 7–0)

Third quarter

- GB – John Kuhn 1 yd run, James Jones, Mason Crosby XP is good, 9:12 (GB 14–0)
- GB – James Jones 65 yd TD pass from Aaron Rodgers, Mason Crosby XP is good, 5:36 (GB 21–0)
- GB – Mason Crosby 35-yard FG is good, 1:14 (GB 24–0)

Fourth quarter

- DET – Keiland Williams 16 yd run, Two-Point Conversion Pass (Matthew Stafford to Titus Young), 13:17 (GB 24–8)
- GB – Mason Crosby 32-yard FG is good, 2:46 (GB 27–8)
- DET – Calvin Johnson 3 yd TD pass from Matthew Stafford, Jason Hanson XP is good, 0:16 (GB 27–15)

Top passers

- GB – Aaron Rodgers – 22/33, 307 yards, 2 TD
- DET – Matthew Stafford – 32/45, 276 yards, 1 TD, 3 INT

Top rushers

- GB – Ryan Grant – 6 rushes, 20 yards
- DET – Maurice Morris – 7 rushes, 39 yards

Top receivers

- GB – James Jones – 3 receptions, 94 yards, 1 TD
- DET – Maurice Morris – 9 receptions, 81 yards

Top tacklers

- GB – Morgan Burnett – 5 tackles
- DET – Amari Spievey – 6 tackles, 1 assist

Coming off their home win over the Buccaneers, the Packers flew to Ford Field for a Week 12 Thanksgiving duel with their NFC North foe, the Detroit Lions. After a scoreless first quarter, Green Bay delivered the game's opening punch in the second quarter with quarterback Aaron Rodgers finding wide receiver Greg Jennings on a 3-yard touchdown pass.

The Packers added to their lead in the third quarter with a 1-yard touchdown run from fullback John Kuhn, followed by Rodgers connecting with wide receiver James Jones on a 65-yard touchdown pass and a 35-yard field goal from kicker Mason Crosby. The Lions answered in the fourth quarter with a 16-yard touchdown run by running back Keiland Williams and a two-point conversion pass from quarterback Matthew Stafford to wide receiver Titus Young), yet Green Bay pulled away with Crosby nailing a 32-yard field goal. Detroit closed out the game with Stafford completing a 3-yard touchdown pass to wide receiver Calvin Johnson.

With the win, the Packers acquired their first 11–0 start in franchise history, beating the 1962 team which started 10–0 and finished 14–1 including postseason play.

Rodgers (22/32 for 307 yards, 2 TDs) was named NFL on FOX's 2011 Galloping Gobbler Award Winner.

=== Week 13: at New York Giants ===
Week Thirteen: Green Bay Packers at New York Giants – Game summary

Quarter	1	2	3	4	Total
Packers	7	14	7	10	38
Giants	10	7	7	11	35

at MetLife Stadium, East Rutherford, New Jersey

- Date: December 4
- Game time: 4:15 pm. EST/3:15 pm. CST
- Game weather: 52 °F (11 °C), Fair
- Game attendance: 80,634
- Referee: Jeff Triplette
- TV announcers (Fox): Joe Buck, Troy Aikman, & Pam Oliver
- Gamebook

Game information

First quarter

- NYG – Travis Beckum 67 yd TD pass from Eli Manning, Lawrence Tynes XP is good, 13:44 (NYG 7–0)
- GB – Jermichael Finley 12 yd TD pass from Aaron Rodgers, Mason Crosby XP is good, 5:16 (7–7)
- NYG – Lawrence Tynes 38-yard FG is good, 2:05 (NYG 10–7)

Second quarter

- GB – Clay Matthews III intercepts pass from Eli Manning, 38 yd. TD run, Mason Crosby XP is good, 15:00 (GB 14–10)
- NYG – Brandon Jacobs 1 yd TD run, Lawrence Tynes XP is good, 6:50 (NYG 17–14)
- GB – Donald Driver 13 yd TD pass from Aaron Rodgers, Mason Crosby XP is good, 1:17 (GB 21–17)

Third quarter

- GB – Greg Jennings 20 yd TD pass from Aaron Rodgers, Mason Crosby XP is good, 10:01 (GB 28–17)
- NYG – Hakeem Nicks 4 yd TD pass from Eli Manning, Lawrence Tynes XP is good, 6:39 (GB 28–24)

Fourth quarter

- NYG – Lawrence Tynes 50-yard FG is good, 10:58 (GB 28–27)
- GB – Donald Driver 7 yd TD pass from Aaron Rodgers, Mason Crosby XP is good, 3:46 (GB 35–27)
- NYG – Hakeem Nicks 2 yd TD pass from Eli Manning, two-point conversion is good by DJ Ware, 1:02 (35–35)
- GB – Mason Crosby 31-yard FG is good, 00:03 (GB 38–35)

Top passers

- GB – Aaron Rodgers – 28/46, 369 yards, 4 TD, 1 INT
- NYG – Eli Manning – 23/40, 347 yards, 3 TD, 1 INT

Top rushers

- GB – Aaron Rodgers – 4 rushes, 32 yards
- NYG – Brandon Jacobs – 8 rushes, 59 yards, 1 TD

Top receivers

- GB – Greg Jennings – 7 receptions, 94 yards, 1 TD
- NYG – Victor Cruz – 7 receptions, 119 yards

Top tacklers

- GB – Charlie Peprah – 6 tackles
- NYG – Linval Joseph – 9 tackles

Mason Crosby made a game-winning field goal the last 3 seconds of the game as the Packers improved to 12–0. The team later clinched the NFC North division title with the Detroit Lions' 31–17 loss to the New Orleans Saints later in the day.

=== Week 14: vs. Oakland Raiders ===
Week Fourteen: Oakland Raiders at Green Bay Packers – Game summary

Quarter	1	2	3	4	Total
Raiders	0	0	7	9	16
Packers	14	17	12	3	46

at Lambeau Field, Green Bay, Wisconsin

- Date: December 11
- Game time: 3:15 pm. CST/1:15 pm. PST
- Game weather: 43 °F (6 °C), Clear
- Game attendance: 70,524
- Referee: Pete Morelli
- TV announcers (CBS): Jim Nantz and Phil Simms
- Gamebook

Game information

First quarter

- GB – Ryan Grant 47 Yard TD Run, Mason Crosby XP, 12:07 (GB 7–0)
- GB – Ryan Taylor 4 Yard TD Pass from Aaron Rodgers, Mason Crosby XP, 4:14 (GB 14–0)

Second quarter

- GB – Mason Crosby 34 Yard FG, 13:10 (GB 17–0)
- GB – Jordy Nelson 37 Yard TD Pass from Aaron Rodgers, Mason Crosby XP, 9:20 (GB 24–0)
- GB – Ryan Grant 6 Yard TD Run, Mason Crosby XP, 7:10 (GB 31–0)

Third quarter

- GB – Mason Crosby 38 Yard FG, 12:45 (GB 34–0)
- OAK – Michael Bush 6 Yard TD Run, Sebastian Janikowski XP, 8:19 (GB 34–7)
- GB – Mason Crosby 49 Yard FG, 3:36 (GB 37–7)
- GB – Erik Walden 5 Yard Fumble Return TD, Mason Crosby Missed XP, 3:00 (GB 43–7)

Fourth quarter

- GB – Mason Crosby 33 Yard FG, 14:24 (GB 46–7)
- OAK – Rolando McClain Sacks Matt Flynn in the Endzone, Safety, 11:05 (GB 46–9)
- OAK – Kevin Boss 6-yard TD pass from Carson Palmer, Sebastian Janikowski XP, 4:52 (GB 46–16)

Top passers

- OAK – Carson Palmer – 24/42, 245 Yards, TD, 4 INT
- GB – Aaron Rodgers – 17/30, 281 Yards, 2 TD, INT

Top rushers

- OAK – Michael Bush – 23 Rushes, 78 Yards, TD
- GB – Ryan Grant – 10 Rushes, 85 Yards, 2 TD

Top receivers

- OAK – Darrius Heyward-Bey – 5 Receptions, 78 Yards, TD
- GB – Jordy Nelson – 3 Receptions, 81 Yards, TD

Top tacklers

- OAK – Rolando McClain – 7 Tackles, 2 Sacks
- GB – Morgan Burnett – 10 Tackles

With the win, the Packers improved to 13–0 for the first time in franchise history.

=== Week 15: at Kansas City Chiefs ===
Week Fifteen: Green Bay Packers at Kansas City Chiefs – Game summary

Quarter	1	2	3	4	Total
Packers	0	0	7	7	14
Chiefs	6	0	3	10	19

at Arrowhead Stadium, Kansas City, Missouri

- Date: December 18
- Game time: 12:00 pm. CST
- Game weather: 50 °F (10 °C), Sunny
- Game attendance: 74,093
- Referee: Gene Steratore
- TV announcers (Fox): Kenny Albert, Daryl Johnston and Tony Siragusa
- Gamebook

Game information

First quarter

- KC – Ryan Succop 19-yard FG is good, 8:59 (KC 3–0)
- KC – Ryan Succop 32-yard FG is good, :15 (KC 6–0)

Second quarter

- No scoring plays

Third quarter

- GB – Donald Driver 2 yd TD pass from Aaron Rodgers, Mason Crosby XP is good, 8:08 (GB 7–6)
- KC – Ryan Succop 46-yard FG is good, 3:50 (KC 9–7)

Fourth quarter

- KC – Ryan Succop 20-yard FG is good, 11:31 (KC 12–7)
- KC – Jackie Battle 1 yd TD run, Ryan Succop XP is good, 4:57 (KC 19–7)
- GB – Aaron Rodgers 8 yd TD run, Mason Crosby XP is good, 4:57 (KC 19–14)

Top passers

- GB – Aaron Rodgers – 17/35, 235 yards, 1 TD
- KC – Kyle Orton – 23/31, 299 yards

Top rushers

- GB – Ryan Grant – 12 rushes, 66 yards
- KC – Thomas Jones – 15 rushes, 48 yards

Top receivers

- GB – Jermichael Finley – 3 receptions, 83 yards
- KC – Leonard Pope – 2 receptions, 72 yards

Top tacklers

- GB – Charles Woodson – 10 tackles
- KC – Derrick Johnson – 7 tackles

In one of the biggest upsets of the year, the Kansas City Chiefs beat the heavily favored Packers. It was also Aaron Rodgers first game of the season where he did not throw for multiple touchdowns. Kyle Orton was the quarterback after he was traded from the Denver Broncos.

With the loss, the Packers fell to 13–1, not only ending their hopes of a perfect season, but also the possibility of 2011 featuring both an undefeated and a winless team at the same time, as the previously 0–13 Indianapolis Colts beat the Tennessee Titans that same day.

=== Week 16: vs. Chicago Bears ===
Christmas Day

Week Sixteen: Chicago Bears at Green Bay Packers – Game summary

Quarter	1	2	3	4	Total
Bears	0	3	7	11	21
Packers	7	7	14	7	35

at Lambeau Field, Green Bay, Wisconsin

- Date: December 25
- Game time: 7:20 pm. CST
- Game weather: 37 °F (3 °C), Cloudy
- Game attendance: 70,574
- Referee: John Parry
- TV announcers (NBC): Al Michaels, Cris Collinsworth, & Michele Tafoya
- Gamebook

Game information

First quarter

- GB – Jermichael Finley 2 yd TD pass from Aaron Rodgers, Mason Crosby XP is good, 10:29 (GB 7–0)

Second quarter

- CHI – Robbie Gould 35-yard FG is good, 2:00 (GB 7–3)
- GB – James Jones 2 yd TD pass from Aaron Rodgers, Mason Crosby XP is good, 00:18 (GB 14–3)

Third quarter

- CHI – Edwin Williams 1 yd TD run, picked up a fumble by Lance Louis, Robbie Gould XP is good, 11:41 (GB 14–10)
- GB – Jordy Nelson 55 yd TD pass from Aaron Rodgers, Mason Crosby XP is good, 10:11 (GB 21–10)
- GB – James Jones 7 yd TD pass from Aaron Rodgers, Mason Crosby XP is good, 1:57 (GB 28–10)

Fourth quarter

- GB – Jordy Nelson 2 yd TD pass from Aaron Rodgers, Mason Crosby XP is good, 14:57 (GB 35–10)
- CHI – Kellen Davis 1 yd TD pass from Josh McCown, Josh McCown 2-point conversion is good, 7:59 (GB 35–18)
- CHI – Robbie Gould 30-yard FG is good, 2:00 (GB 35–21)

Top passers

- CHI – Josh McCown – 19/28, 242 yards, 1 TD, 2 INT
- GB – Aaron Rodgers – 21/29, 283 yards, 5 TD

Top rushers

- CHI – Kahlil Bell – 23 rushes, 121 yards
- GB – Ryan Grant – 8 rushes, 44 yards

Top receivers

- CHI – Roy Williams – 6 receptions, 81 yards
- GB – Jordy Nelson – 6 receptions, 115 yards, 2 TD

Top tacklers

- CHI – Craig Steltz – 5 tackles
- GB – Desmond Bishop – 9 tackles

=== Week 17: vs. Detroit Lions ===
Week Seventeen: Detroit Lions at Green Bay Packers – Game summary

Quarter	1	2	3	4	Total
Lions	9	10	15	7	41
Packers	10	14	7	14	45

at Lambeau Field, Green Bay, Wisconsin

- Date: January 1
- Game time: 12:00 pm. CST/1:00 pm. EST
- Game weather: 31 °F (−1 °C), Cloudy
- Game attendance: 70,294
- Referee: Walt Coleman
- TV announcers (Fox): Thom Brennaman, Brian Billick, & Laura Okmin
- Gamebook

Game information

First quarter

- DET – Titus Young 8 yd TD pass from Matthew Stafford, Jason Hanson XP is good, 13:05 (DET 7–0)
- DET – Pat Lee tackled into the end zone by team for a Safety, 13:00 (DET 9–0)
- GB – Mason Crosby 22-yard FG is good, 5:58 (DET 9–3)
- GB – Jordy Nelson 7 yd TD pass from Matt Flynn, Mason Crosby XP is good, 00:21 (GB 10–9)

Second quarter

- DET – Calvin Johnson 13 yd TD pass from Matthew Stafford, Jason Hanson XP is good, 13:05 (DET 16–10)
- GB – Ryan Grant 80 yd TD pass from Matt Flynn, Mason Crosby XP is good, 8:13 (GB 17–16)
- DET – Jason Hanson 30-yard FG is good, 5:57 (DET 19–17)
- GB – Jordy Nelson 36 yd TD pass from Matt Flynn, Mason Crosby XP is good, 3:43 (GB 24–19)

Third quarter

- DET – Titus Young 2 yd TD pass from Matthew Stafford, Jason Hanson XP is good, 6:44 (DET 26–24)
- GB – Jordy Nelson 58 yd TD pass from Matt Flynn, Mason Crosby XP is good, 4:41 (GB 31–26)
- DET – Kevin Smith 5 yd TD pass from Matthew Stafford, Two-point conversion is good, 2:13 (DET 34–31)

Fourth quarter

- GB – Donald Driver 35 yd TD pass from Matt Flynn, Mason Crosby XP is good, 8:18 (GB 38–34)
- DET – Tony Scheffler 12 yd TD pass from Matthew Stafford, Jason Hanson XP is good, 2:44 (DET 41–38)
- GB – Jermichael Finley 4 yd TD pass from Matt Flynn, Mason Crosby XP is good, 1:13 (GB 45–41)

Top passers

- DET – Matthew Stafford – 36/59, 520 yards, 5 TD, 2 INT
- GB – Matt Flynn – 31/44, 480 yards, 6 TD, 1 INT

Top rushers

- DET – Kevin Smith – 9 rushes, 35 yards
- GB – Ryan Grant – 12 rushes, 48 yards

Top receivers

- DET – Calvin Johnson – 11 receptions, 244 yards, 1 TD
- GB – Jordy Nelson – 9 receptions, 162 yards, 3 TD

Top tacklers

- DET – Alphonso Smith – 7 tackles
- GB – Charlie Peprah – 8 tackles

With the win, the Packers would finish their season at 15–1 and also sweep the Lions for the first time since 2009. They also swept the NFC North for the first time ever since the NFL created divisions in 1967. This is also the highest-scoring game between the Lions and the Packers in the history of the rivalry between both teams with a combined total of 86 points. Aaron Rodgers, Charles Woodson, Greg Jennings, and Clay Matthews were put as inactive, after already securing the bye week, to avoid injury.

During the game, Brad Jones restrained a 15 year old fan who ran onto the field.

== Postseason (Playoffs) ==
=== NFC Divisional Round: vs. (4) New York Giants ===
Divisional Round: (4) New York Giants at (1) Green Bay Packers – Game summary

Quarter	1	2	3	4	Total
Giants	10	10	0	17	37
Packers	3	7	3	7	20

at Lambeau Field, Green Bay, Wisconsin

- Date: January 15
- Game time: 3:30 pm. CST/4:30 pm. EST
- Game attendance: 72,080
- Referee: Bill Leavy
- TV announcers (Fox): Joe Buck, Troy Aikman, Pam Oliver and Chris Myers
- Game Book

Game information

See scoring summary below

Top passers

- NYG – Eli Manning 21/33, 330 YDS, 3 TD, INT
- GB – Aaron Rodgers 26/46, 264 YDS, 2 TD, INT

Top rushers

- NYG – Ahmad Bradshaw 12 RUSH, 63 YDS
- GB – Aaron Rodgers 7 RUSH, 66 YDS

Top receivers

- NYG – Hakeem Nicks 7 REC, 165 YDS, 2 TD
- GB – Donald Driver 3 REC, 45 YDS, TD

Top tacklers

- NYG – Michael Boley 8 TKL, AST, 2 SACK
- GB – Charlie Peprah 9 TKL

Eli Manning threw three touchdowns, which proved to be instrumental in the Giants victory, thus dethroning the Packers from their World Championship as their overall record stumbled to 15–2.

The Packers recorded a season high nine dropped passes. They also recorded a season high four turnovers in the game. The coaching staff of the Packers, in particular head coach Mike McCarthy raved of the Packers precise practice performance in the week leading up to the playoff game. The reason for the inefficient offensive performance from one of the league's most historically prolific offensive units is unknown, though the Packers' decision to rest their starters may have been costly to their players, as doing so tends to put players "out of rhythm". Another contributing factor was possibly the disappearance and death of Michael Philbin, Offensive Coordinator Joe Philbin's son, five days before. Quarterback Aaron Rodgers went a full three weeks without taking the field, and the offense dropped several crucial passes. The Packers also became the 3rd team to finish the regular season 15–1 and not reach the Super Bowl, and the first to not win a single playoff game.

Also, the Giants handed the Packers their second loss and first home loss of the season. The Packers would also be the second team with a 13-game winning streak to fail to win a playoff game, after the 2005 Colts.

Scoring summary

Quarter	Time	Drive			Team	Scoring information	Score	
Quarter	Time	Plays	Yards	TOP	Team	Scoring information	Giants	Packers
1	8:33	13	67	6:27	Giants	31-yard field goal by Lawrence Tynes	3	0
1	5:33	8	50	3:00	Packers	47-yard field goal by Mason Crosby	3	3
1	3:47	4	80	1:36	Giants	Hakeem Nicks 66-yard touchdown reception from Eli Manning, Lawrence Tynes kick good	10	3
2	14:54	9	60	3:53	Packers	John Kuhn 8-yard touchdown reception from Aaron Rodgers, Mason Crosby kick good	10	10
2	1:51	5	29	1:46	Giants	23-yard field goal by Lawrence Tynes	13	10
2	0:00	4	69	0:41	Giants	Hakeem Nicks 37-yard touchdown reception from Eli Manning, Lawrence Tynes kick good	20	10
3	3:50	10	58	4:58	Packers	35-yard field goal by Mason Crosby	20	13
4	7:48	10	38	5:06	Giants	35-yard field goal by Lawrence Tynes	23	13
4	6:48	1	4	0:05	Giants	Mario Manningham 4-yard touchdown reception from Eli Manning, Lawrence Tynes kick good	30	13
4	4:46	8	76	2:02	Packers	Donald Driver 16-yard touchdown reception from Aaron Rodgers, Mason Crosby kick good	30	20
4	2:36	6	50	2:10	Giants	Brandon Jacobs 14-yard touchdown run, Lawrence Tynes kick good	37	20
"TOP" = time of possession. For other American football terms, see Glossary of American football.							37	20

== Statistics ==
=== Regular season statistical leaders ===
	Player(s)	Value	NFL Rank	NFC Rank
Passing yards	Aaron Rodgers	4643 Yards	5th	4th
Passing Touchdowns	Aaron Rodgers	45 TDs	2nd	2nd
Rushing yards	James Starks	578 Yards	38th	18th
Rushing Touchdowns	John Kuhn	4 TDs	T-31st	T-16th
Receiving Yards	Jordy Nelson	1263 Yards	9th	7th
Receiving Touchdowns	Jordy Nelson	15 TDs	3rd	2nd
Points	Mason Crosby	140 Points	4th	3rd
Kickoff Return Yards	Randall Cobb	941 Yards	7th	4th
Punt Return Yards	Randall Cobb	295 Yards	18th	8th
Tackles	Desmond Bishop	115 Tackles	T-13th	T-7th
Sacks	Clay Matthews	6 Sacks	T-48th	T-26th
Interceptions	Charles Woodson	7 INTs	T-1st	1st

stats values are correct through Week 17.

=== Best game performances ===
	Player(s)	Value	Opponent
Passing yards	Matt Flynn	480 Yards	Detroit Lions
Passing Touchdowns	Matt Flynn	6 TDs	Detroit Lions
Rushing yards	Ryan Grant	92 Yards	Chicago Bears
Rushing Touchdowns	Aaron Rodgers	2 TDs	Denver Broncos
Receiving Yards	Jordy Nelson	162 Yards	Detroit Lions
Receiving Touchdowns	Jermichael Finley	3 TDs	@ Chicago Bears
Receiving Touchdowns	Jordy Nelson	3 TDs	Detroit Lions
Points	Jermichael Finley	18 Points	@ Chicago Bears
Points	Jordy Nelson	18 Points	Detroit Lions
Tackles	Morgan Burnett	14 Tackles	New Orleans Saints
Tackles	Desmond Bishop	14 Tackles	St. Louis Rams
Sacks	Jarius Wynn	2 Sacks	@ Chicago Bears
Sacks	Clay Matthews	2 Sacks	@ Minnesota Vikings
Interceptions	Morgan Burnett	2 INTs	@ Chicago Bears
Interceptions	Charles Woodson	2 INTs	@ Carolina Panthers and @ Minnesota Vikings
Interceptions	Charlie Peprah	2 INTs	@ San Diego Chargers
Interceptions	Tramon Williams	2 INTs	Tampa Bay Buccaneers

stats are correct through Week 17.

=== Statistical league rankings ===
- Total Offense (YPG): 3rd
- Passing (YPG): 3rd
- Rushing (YPG): 27th
- Points (PPG): 1st
- Total Defense (YPG): 32nd
- Passing (YPG): 32nd
- Rushing (YPG): 14th
- Points (PPG): 19th

Stats correct through week 17.

== Awards and records ==
=== Awards ===
==== Weekly awards ====
- QB Aaron Rodgers was named NFC Offensive Player of the Week for games played on Week 1. (vs. Saints)
- WR Randall Cobb was named NFL's Pepsi Rookie of the Week for games played on Week 1. (vs. Saints)
- OLB Clay Matthews was named GMC Never Say Never Moment of the Week for his contributions to the goal line stand on Week 1. (vs. Saints)
- QB Aaron Rodgers was named FedEx Air Player of the Week for games played on Week 4. (vs. Broncos)
- QB Aaron Rodgers was named NFC Offensive Player of the Week for games played on Week 5. (vs. Falcons)
- QB Aaron Rodgers was named FedEx Air Player of the Week for games played on Week 5. (vs. Falcons)
- K Mason Crosby was named NFC Special Teams Player of the Week for games played on Week 5. (vs. Falcons)
- QB Aaron Rodgers was named FedEx Air Player of the Week for games played on Week 6. (vs. Rams)
- K Mason Crosby was named NFC Special Teams Player of the Week for games played on Week 7. (vs. Vikings)
- QB Aaron Rodgers was named FedEx Air Player of the Week for games played on Week 7. (vs. Vikings)
- QB Aaron Rodgers was named NFC Offensive Player of the Week for games played on Week 9. (vs. Chargers)
- QB Aaron Rodgers was named FedEx Air Player of the Week for games played on Week 9. (vs. Chargers)
- QB Aaron Rodgers was named FedEx Air Player of the Week for games played on Week 13. (vs. Giants)
- QB Aaron Rodgers was named GMC Never Say Never Moment of the Week for his contributions to the game-winning drive on Week 13. (vs. Giants)
- P Tim Masthay was named NFC Special Teams Player of the Week for games played on Week 13. (vs. Giants)
- QB Matt Flynn was named NFC Offensive Player of the Week for games played on Week 17. (vs. Lions)
- QB Matt Flynn was named FedEx Air Player of the Week for games played on Week 17. (vs. Lions)
- QB Matt Flynn was named GMC Never Say Never Moment of the Week for his contributions to his record setting performance in relief of Aaron Rodgers on Week 17. (vs. Lions)

===== Monthly awards =====
- QB Aaron Rodgers was named NFC Offensive Player of the Month for the month of September.
- QB Aaron Rodgers was named NFC Offensive Player of the Month for the month of October.
- QB Aaron Rodgers was named NFC Offensive Player of the Month for the month of November.

===== Annual awards =====
- QB Aaron Rodgers was named AP Male Athlete of the Year (2011).
- QB Aaron Rodgers was named AP Most Valuable Player

=== Records ===
==== Team ====
===== Season =====
- Packers record for Most consecutive games Won with 19 (Wk 15 2010 – Wk 14 2011) passing the previous best marks of 11 in 1928–29 and 1961–62.
- Packers record for Most consecutive games won, season with 13 (Wk 1 – Wk 14) passing the previous best mark of 10 in 1929 and 1962.
- Packers record for Most Games won, regular season with 15 passing the previous best mark of 13 in 1962, 1996, 1997 and 2007.
- Packers record for Most consecutive games won, start of season with 13 passing the previous best mark of 10 in 1929 and 1962.
- Packers record for Most consecutive games without defeat, season with 13 (13 wins, 0 ties) passing the previous best mark of 13 (12 wins, 1 tie) in 1929.
- Packers record for Most consecutive games without defeat, start of season with 13 (13 wins, 0 ties) passing the previous best mark of 13 (12 wins, 1 tie) in 1929.
- Packers record for Most Points, season with 560 points passing the previous best mark of 461 in 2009.
- Packers record for Most overall touchdowns, season with 70 passing the previous best mark of 56 in 1996.
- Packers record for Most touchdown passes, season with 51 passing the previous record of 39 in 1996.
- Packers record for Most yards gained, season with 6,482 yards passing the previous best mark of 6,357 in 2004.

==== Individual ====
===== Game =====
- QB Aaron Rodgers became the first quarterback in NFL history to post 400 yards passing, four passing touchdowns and two rushing touchdowns in a game against the Denver Broncos on October 2, 2011.
- QB Matt Flynn Broke the Packers record of Most touchdown passes, game with 6 vs the Detroit Lions January 1, 2012. The Previous record holders were Cecil Bell, Don Horn, Lynn Dickey, Brett Favre, and Aaron Rodgers.
- QB Matt Flynn Broke the Packers Record of Most passing yards, game with 480 Yards vs the Detroit Lions on January 1, 2012. The previous record holder was Aaron Rodgers.
- K Mason Crosby successfully converted a team record 58-yard field goal against the Minnesota Vikings on October 23, 2011. The previous record was 56, set by Crosby himself.

===== Season =====
- QB Aaron Rodgers Set the Packers record for Single-season passer rating with a rating of 122.5. Bart Starr had the previous best with a rating of 105.0.
- QB Aaron Rodgers Set the NFL record for Single-season passer rating with a rating of 122.5. Peyton Manning had the previous best with a rating of 121.1.
- QB Aaron Rodgers Set the Packers record for Highest completion percentage, season (140 attempts) with 68.3%. Brett Favre had the previous best percentage with 66.54%.
- QB Aaron Rodgers Set the Packers record for Most touchdown passes, season with 45. Brett Favre had the previous best mark with 39.
- QB Aaron Rodgers Set the Packers record for Most yards passing, season with 4,643. Lynn Dickey had the previous best mark with 4,458 yards.
- QB Aaron Rodgers Set the Packers record for Most games, 300 or more yards passing, season with 8. Brett Favre had the previous best mark with 7.
- QB Aaron Rodgers Set the Packers record for Most consecutive games, 300 or More Yards Passing with 4 (Wk's 4–7). Lynn Dickey and Brett Favre both had the previous best with 3 each.
- QB Aaron Rodgers Tied the Packers record for Most consecutive games, Four or More Touchdown Passes with Brett Favre with 2.
- QB Aaron Rodgers Tied the Packers record for Highest average gain, season (200 attempts) with Lynn Dickey at 9.2.
- WR Randall Cobb Set the Packers record for Most Kickoff Return Yards, Rookie, season passing Charles Wilson who had 798 yards in 1990.
- K Mason Crosby Set the Packers record for Most (Kicking) PAT attempted, season with 69 passing Chris Jacke's best mark of 53.
- K Mason Crosby Set the Packers record for Most (one-point) points after touchdown, season with 68 passing Jan Stenerud's best mark of 52.
- P Tim Masthay Set the Packers record for Highest gross average, punting, season (35 punts) with 45.6 passing Craig Hentrich's best gross average of 45.0.

===== Career =====
- Donald Driver set the Packers record for Career receiving yards in Week 2 vs the Carolina Panthers. Passing James Lofton previous best mark of 9,656.

=== 2012 Pro Bowl selections ===
Position	Player	Team
QB	Aaron Rodgers	Starter
FB	John Kuhn	Starter
WR	Greg Jennings	Reserve
C	Scott Wells	Reserve
DT	B. J. Raji	Reserve
LB	Clay Matthews	Starter
CB	Charles Woodson	Starter
