= Ryan Taylor (American football) =

American football player (born 1987)

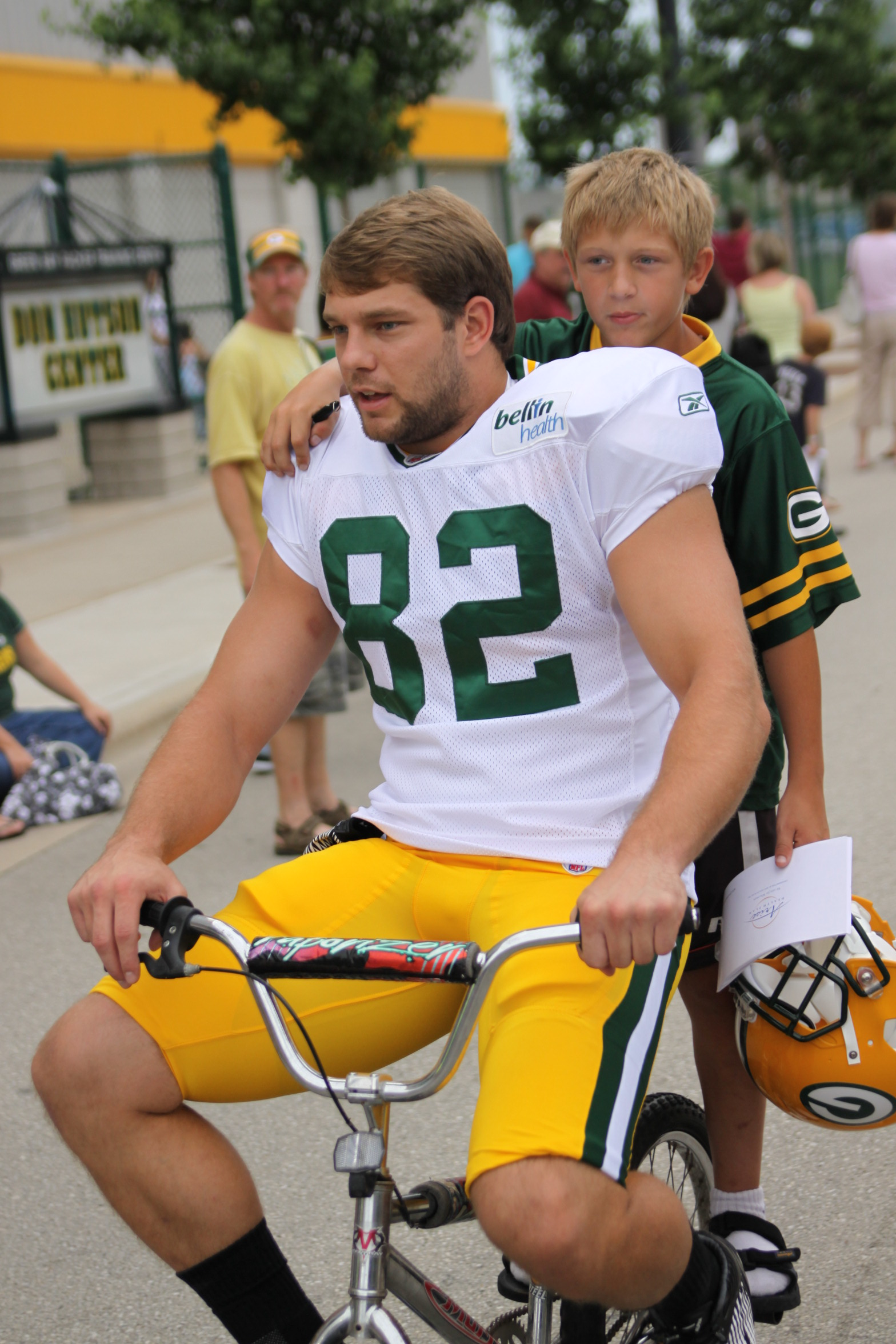
- Taylor with the Green Bay Packers in 2011

No. 82, 87
- Position: Tight end

Personal information
- Born: November 16, 1987 (age 39); Winston-Salem, North Carolina, U.S.
- Listed height: 6 ft 3 in (1.91 m)
- Listed weight: 254 lb (115 kg)

Career information
- High school: Mount Tabor (Winston-Salem)
- College: North Carolina (2006–2010)
- NFL draft: 2011: 7th round, 218th overall pick

Career history
- Green Bay Packers (2011–2014); Baltimore Ravens (2014); Cleveland Browns (2014); Miami Dolphins (2015)*; Kansas City Chiefs (2015)*
- * Offseason or practice squad member only

Career NFL statistics
- Receptions: 8
- Receiving yards: 45
- Receiving touchdowns: 1
- Stats at Pro Football Reference

Ryan Lawrence Taylor (born November 16, 1987) is an American former professional football player who was a tight end in the National Football League (NFL). He played college football for the North Carolina Tar Heels. Taylor was selected by the Green Bay Packers in the seventh round of the 2011 NFL draft. He was also a member of the Baltimore Ravens, Cleveland Browns, Miami Dolphins, and Kansas City Chiefs.

== Early life ==
Taylor attended Mount Tabor High School in Winston-Salem, North Carolina, and played on all sides of the ball. During his time on the team, he was a two time all-conference selection and went 12-2 in his sophomore season, making it into the state championship. As a senior, Taylor broke the single season records with 64 receptions that went for 1,180 yards and had 13 touchdowns. On top of that, he rushed the ball 13 times for 85 yards and an additional three scores. On special teams, he returned nine kicks and 16 punts for 177 and 116 yards respectively. Coming out of high school, Taylor received scholarship offers for lacrosse at the University of Virginia, but turned them down to play football for the North Carolina Tar Heels. Rivals.com ranked him as the 47th best tight end in the country and he was considered the 21st best player in the state of North Carolina; he was also a member of the state's Shrine Team.

== College career ==
Taylor played four seasons at North Carolina and departed as a redshirt senior. His role for the Tar Heels was limited to special teams during his first year. He was one of four true freshman to see playing time. Playing special teams he had four tackles, two solo stops and two assists. He again continued to play primarily on special teams during his sophomore season. He had five tackles, and in a game against James Madison University recovered a blocked punt. Taylor began to have a bigger role in his junior season, and was named as a special teams captain. He played in all thirteen games and had 19 tackles, the majority of which were on special teams, but the others as a backup linebacker. During a game against NC State, he played on all three sides of the ball as a Tight End, Linebacker, and on special teams. In 2009, he was redshirted after injuring his knee in camp. In his final year with the Tar heels, he again played on all the sides of the ball and was the special teams captain for the second time in his career. After the loss of starting tight end Zack Pianalto, he took over as the starter and went on to break the school record for receptions as a tight end with 36, two of those for touchdowns.

== Professional career ==
=== Pre-draft ===
Pre-draft measurables
Height	Weight	40-yard dash	10-yard split	20-yard split	20-yard shuttle	Three-cone drill	Vertical jump	Broad jump	Bench press
6 ft 3 1/2 in (1.92 m)	254 lb (115 kg)	4.76 s	1.69 s	2.82 s	4.47 s	7.09 s	34.0 in (0.86 m)	9 ft 10 in (3.00 m)	21 reps
All values from Pro Day

Taylor was considered to be a possible H-back candidate in the National Football League. Scouts stated that he had "solid hands" and "snatches low and high throws with equal aplomb". They also stated that he was quick on his routes and could separate linebackers from the inside or outside. For his negatives they stated that he only had "average" size for his position and did not possess the strength to be an inside linebacker. They also stated that he could not separate with the speed of NFL linebackers.

=== Green Bay Packers ===
Taylor was selected in the seventh round (218th overall) by the Green Bay Packers in the 2011 NFL draft. On July 29, 2011, he signed a contract with the Packers.

On December 14, 2011, Taylor caught his first reception and touchdown as a professional, against the Oakland Raiders. The catch was a four-yard completion from Aaron Rodgers.

On October 6, 2014, he was waived by the Packers.

=== Baltimore Ravens ===
On October 7, 2014, Taylor was claimed off waivers by the Baltimore Ravens. He was inactive for weeks 6 and 7 and did not play in any games during his tenure with the Ravens.

On October 25, 2014, he was waived by Ravens.

=== Cleveland Browns ===
Taylor was claimed off waivers by the Cleveland Browns on October 27, 2014. On December 27, 2014, he was released by the Browns.

=== Miami Dolphins ===
The Miami Dolphins signed Taylor on February 10, 2015. On May 11, 2015, Taylor was released to make room for the signing of TE Tim Semisch.

=== Kansas City Chiefs ===
Taylor signed with the Kansas City Chiefs in May 2015. On September 5, 2015, the Chiefs cut Taylor.

== Career stats ==
Year	Team	Games	Receptions	Targets	Receiving Yards	Yards per Reception	Longest Reception	Receiving Touchdowns	First Downs	Fumbles	Fumbles Lost
2011	GB	15	1	1	4	4.0	4	1	1	0	0
2012	GB	16	1	1	11	11.0	11	0	1	0	0
2013	GB	14	6	9	30	5.0	8	0	2	1	0
Total		45	8	11	45	5.6	11	1	4	1	0
