= James Starks =

American football player (born 1986)

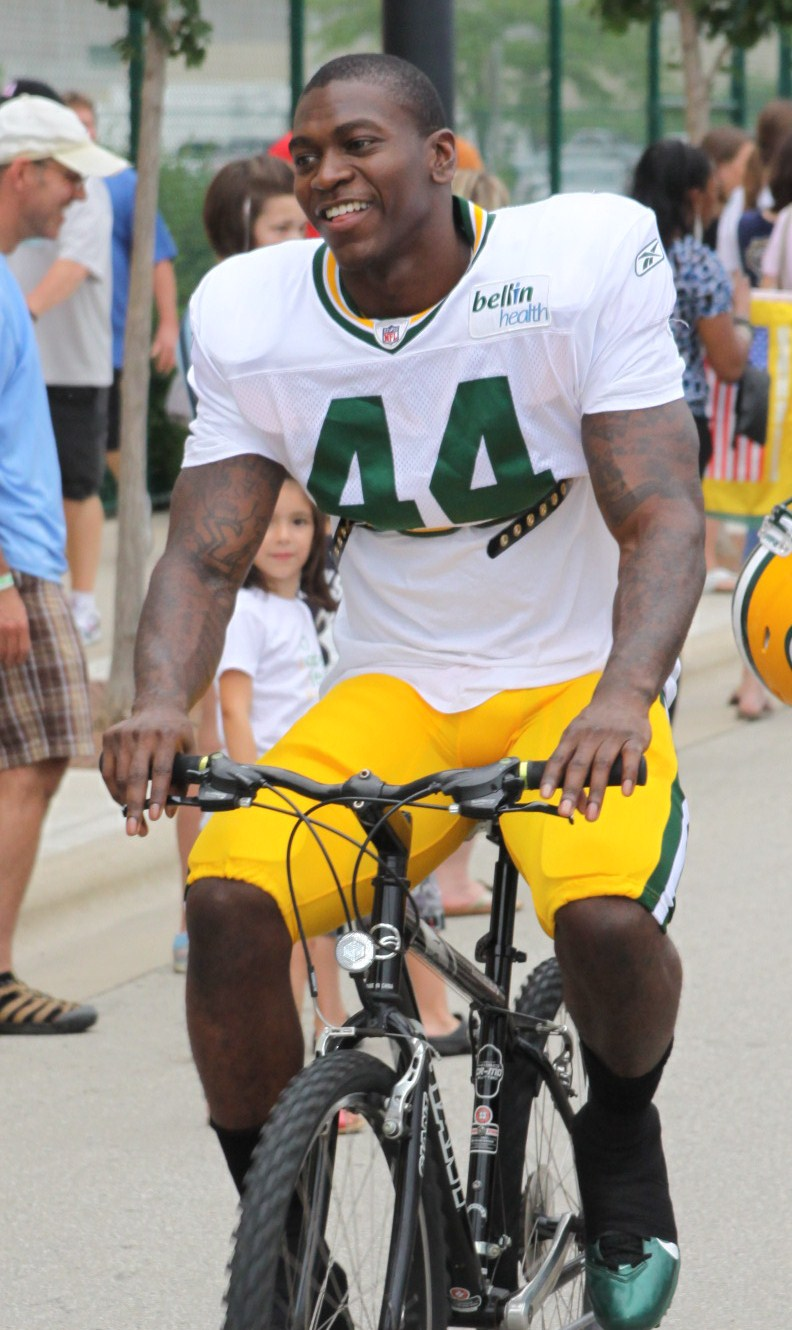
- Starks in 2011

No. 44
- Position: Running back

Personal information
- Born: February 25, 1986 (age 40); Niagara Falls, New York, U.S.
- Listed height: 6 ft 2 in (1.88 m)
- Listed weight: 218 lb (99 kg)

Career information
- High school: Niagara Falls
- College: Buffalo (2005–2009)
- NFL draft: 2010: 6th round, 193rd overall pick

Career history
- Green Bay Packers (2010–2016)

Awards and highlights
- Super Bowl champion (XLV); First-team All-MAC (2008); 2× Second-team All-MAC (2006, 2007)

Career NFL statistics
- Rushing yards: 2,506
- Rushing average: 4.1
- Rushing touchdowns: 9
- Receptions: 125
- Receiving yards: 1,017
- Receiving touchdowns: 6
- Stats at Pro Football Reference

James Darell Starks (born February 25, 1986) is an American former professional football player who was a running back for the Green Bay Packers of the National Football League (NFL). He played college football for the Buffalo Bulls and was selected by the Packers in the sixth round of the 2010 NFL draft. He was a member of their Super Bowl XLV championship team that beat the Pittsburgh Steelers.

== Early life ==
James attended high school in Niagara Falls, New York, where he played football and ran track. In football, he ran for 1,048 yards and threw for over 600 yards for the Wolverines of Niagara Falls High School while earning All-Western New York honors in his senior season and nomination for The Connolly Cup. He served as a captain for three years. In track & field, Starks was one of the states top performers in the long jump (PR of 7.00 meters), and also recorded an 11.14 100-meter dash time.

Considered only a two-star recruit by Rivals.com, Starks's only scholarship offer came from Buffalo, which he accepted.

== College career ==
Starks attended the University at Buffalo, where he played on the Bulls football team from 2006 to 2009. He set a career rushing record with 3,140 yards, and scored 40 total touchdowns. He registered back-to-back 1,000 yard seasons as a sophomore and junior. He was one of the elite backs in the MAC and became the first 1,000-yard rusher in the Bulls’ Division I-A era. He also became the first UB freshman to earn All-MAC recognition in 2006. He earned second-team All-MAC honors as a freshman and sophomore, and was named to the All-MAC first-team as a junior. Starks did not play in his senior season due to a shoulder injury. He is also a member of Phi Beta Sigma fraternity.

=== College statistics ===
Year	Team	GP	Rushing					Receiving				
Year	Team	GP	Att	Yds	Avg	Lng	TD	Rec	Yds	Avg	Lng	TD
2006	Buffalo	12	175	704	4.0	54	6	34	226	6.6	30	0
2007	Buffalo	12	251	1,103	4.4	92	12	41	311	7.6	74	2
2008	Buffalo	12	272	1,333	4.9	66	16	52	361	6.9	65	1
Total		36	698	3,140	4.5	92	34	127	898	7.1	74	3
Source: FoxSports.com

== Professional career ==
External videos
- Starks's NFL Combine workout

Pre-draft measurables
Height	Weight	Arm length	Hand span	40-yard dash	10-yard split	20-yard split	20-yard shuttle	Three-cone drill	Vertical jump	Broad jump	Bench press
6 ft 2 1/8 in (1.88 m)	218 lb (99 kg)	33 3/4 in (0.86 m)	9 1/2 in (0.24 m)	4.50 s	1.61 s	2.69 s	4.23 s	6.89 s	36.0 in (0.91 m)	9 ft 11 in (3.02 m)	15 reps
All values are from NFL Combine

Starks was selected in the sixth round (193rd overall) by the Green Bay Packers in the 2010 NFL draft. On June 23, 2010, he signed a contract with the Packers. Starks was placed on reserve/physically unable to perform on August 31, 2010. On November 9, 2010, he was activated from the physically unable to perform list. He made his NFL debut on December 5 against the San Francisco 49ers, with 18 carries for 73 yards. On January 9 in the 2011 Wild Card Playoff game against the Philadelphia Eagles, Starks broke the Packers' rookie post-season record for rushing yards in a single game. His first touchdown came against the Chicago Bears in the NFC championship game. On the weekend before the Super Bowl, the Niagara Falls—in his hometown of Niagara Falls, New York—were lit green and gold in his honor. The following Monday, Starks met with Niagara Falls mayor Paul Dyster.

Starks's rookie season finished with a win against the Pittsburgh Steelers in Super Bowl XLV in which he rushed for 52 yards on 11 carries. He ended the postseason with the third-most rushing yards for a rookie running back in a single playoffs behind Timmy Smith in 1987 and Jamal Lewis in 2000. Starks' 315 playoff yards in four games was more than triple his total of 101 yards from three games as an active player in the regular season.

In the 2011 season, Starks led the Packers in rushing yards with 578. However, Starks utilized a physical style of play which exposed him to injuries. Starks missed three games with an ankle injury that year.

In the 2012 season, Starks was plagued by turf toe in September and a bone bruise in December. By the end of the season, he managed only 71 carries in six games.

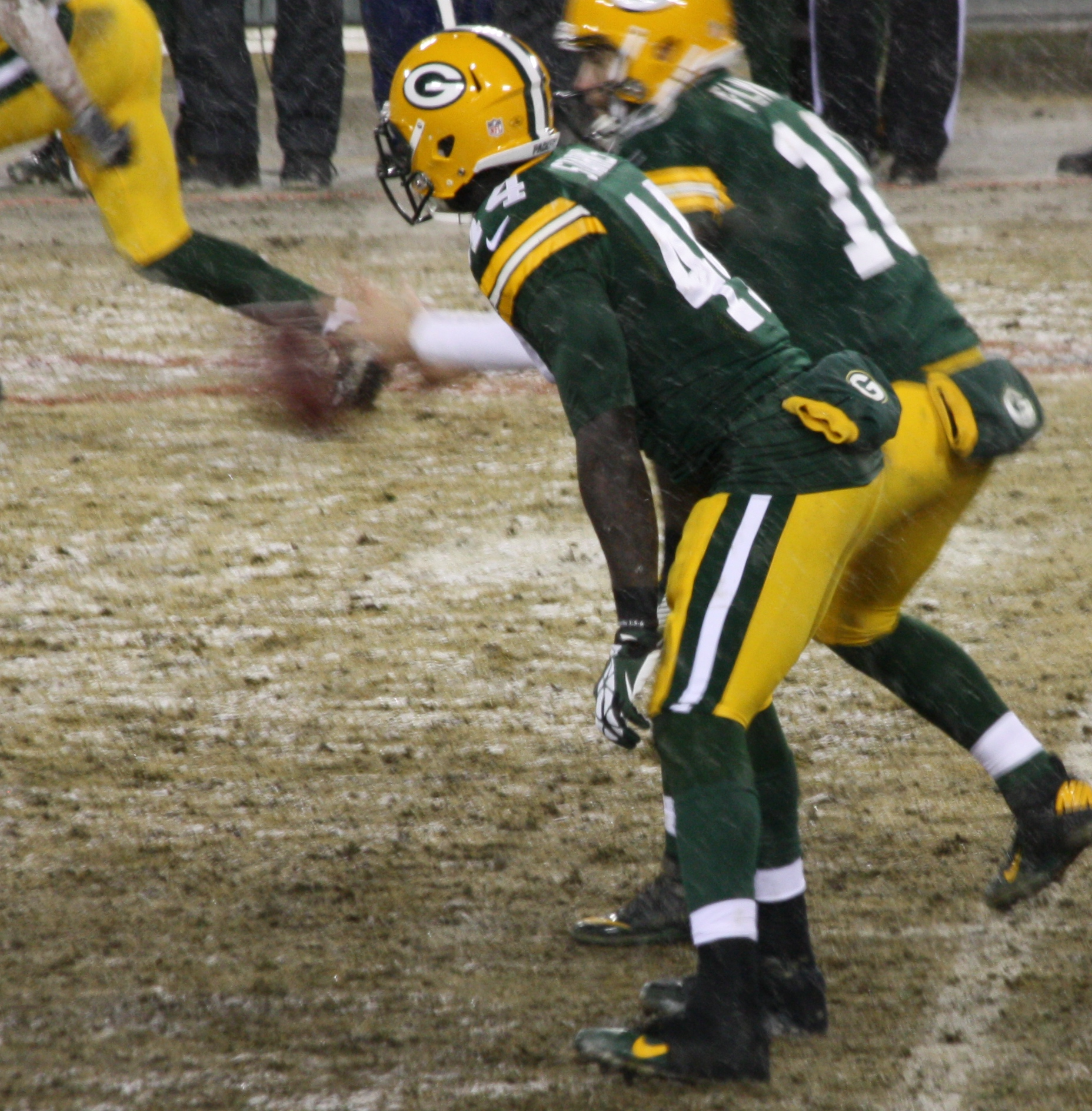
Starks lined up at running back for the Packers in 2013

Starks performed adequately in limited action during the 2013 season. On September 15, 2013, against the Washington Redskins, Starks rushed for over 100 yards in a game for the first time in his career. His 132 yards on 20 carries marked the first time a Packers player had topped 100 yards since Brandon Jackson in 2010, also against the Redskins. In the following game, Starks exited with a knee injury and would miss the following three games. Capitalizing on Starks's injuries, Packers rookie running back Eddie Lacy became the team's star running back.

Between various lower body injuries, Starks missed 29 games and played in only 35 in his first four seasons in the NFL.

Prior to the 2014 season, Starks and the Packers agreed on a two-year contract worth $3.165 million with the expectation that he would be the backup to Eddie Lacy. After missing so much time due to injury, Starks adjusted his style of play to be more conservative, evading tackles instead of absorbing or breaking them. As a result, he played the first two full seasons of his career, managing to appear in all 32 games of his two-year contract.

During the 2015 season, starter Eddie Lacy's playing time decreased due to issues with conditioning and his violations of the team's curfew. Lacy's diminished workload and Starks's continued health contributed to Starks receiving four starts during the season and registering career high totals in rushing yards, receiving yards and touchdowns.

In March 2016, after visiting with the New England Patriots, Starks, an unrestricted free agent, agreed to a two-year contract to return to the Packers. On October 16, 2016, Starks, who had been second on Green Bay's depth chart behind Eddie Lacy, underwent surgery to repair a torn meniscus in his knee. Starks also dealt with a family death about the same time as the surgery. To compound his 2016 troubles, he was involved in a car crash on December 12, and went into concussion protocol, missing the next game.

On February 7, 2017, Starks was released by the Packers after seven seasons with a non-football injury designation.

In 2025, it was announced that Starks would be inducted into the Greater Buffalo Sports Hall of Fame.

== NFL career statistics ==
=== Regular season ===
Year	Team	GP	GS	Rushing					Receiving					Fumbles	
Year	Team	GP	GS	Att	Yds	Avg	Lng	TD	Rec	Yds	Avg	Lng	TD	Fum	Lost
2010	GB	3	0	29	101	3.5	16	0	2	15	7.5	12	0	0	0
2011	GB	13	2	133	578	4.3	40	1	29	216	7.4	17	0	2	1
2012	GB	6	2	71	255	3.6	22	1	4	31	7.8	9	0	1	0
2013	GB	13	1	89	493	5.5	41	3	10	89	8.9	23	1	1	0
2014	GB	16	0	85	333	3.9	41	2	18	140	7.8	28	0	1	0
2015	GB	16	4	148	601	4.1	65	2	43	392	9.1	30	3	5	3
2016	GB	9	4	63	145	2.3	11	0	19	134	7.1	31	2	1	0
Total		76	13	618	2,506	4.1	65	9	125	1,017	8.1	31	6	11	4
Source: NFL.com

=== Postseason ===
Year	Team	GP	GS	Rushing					Receiving					Fumbles	
Year	Team	GP	GS	Att	Yds	Avg	Lng	TD	Rec	Yds	Avg	Lng	TD	Fum	Lost
2010	GB	4	4	81	315	3.9	27	1	3	15	5.0	8	0	0	0
2011	GB	1	0	6	43	7.2	29	0	4	24	6.0	12	0	0	0
2013	GB	1	0	5	29	5.8	10	0	1	13	13.0	13	0	0	0
2014	GB	2	0	10	60	6.0	32	0	1	0	0.0	0	0	0	0
2015	GB	2	0	19	76	4.0	22	1	6	16	2.7	6	0	0	0
Total		10	4	121	523	4.3	32	2	15	68	4.5	13	0	0	0
Source: pro-football-reference.com
