= Charlie Peprah =

American football player (born 1983)

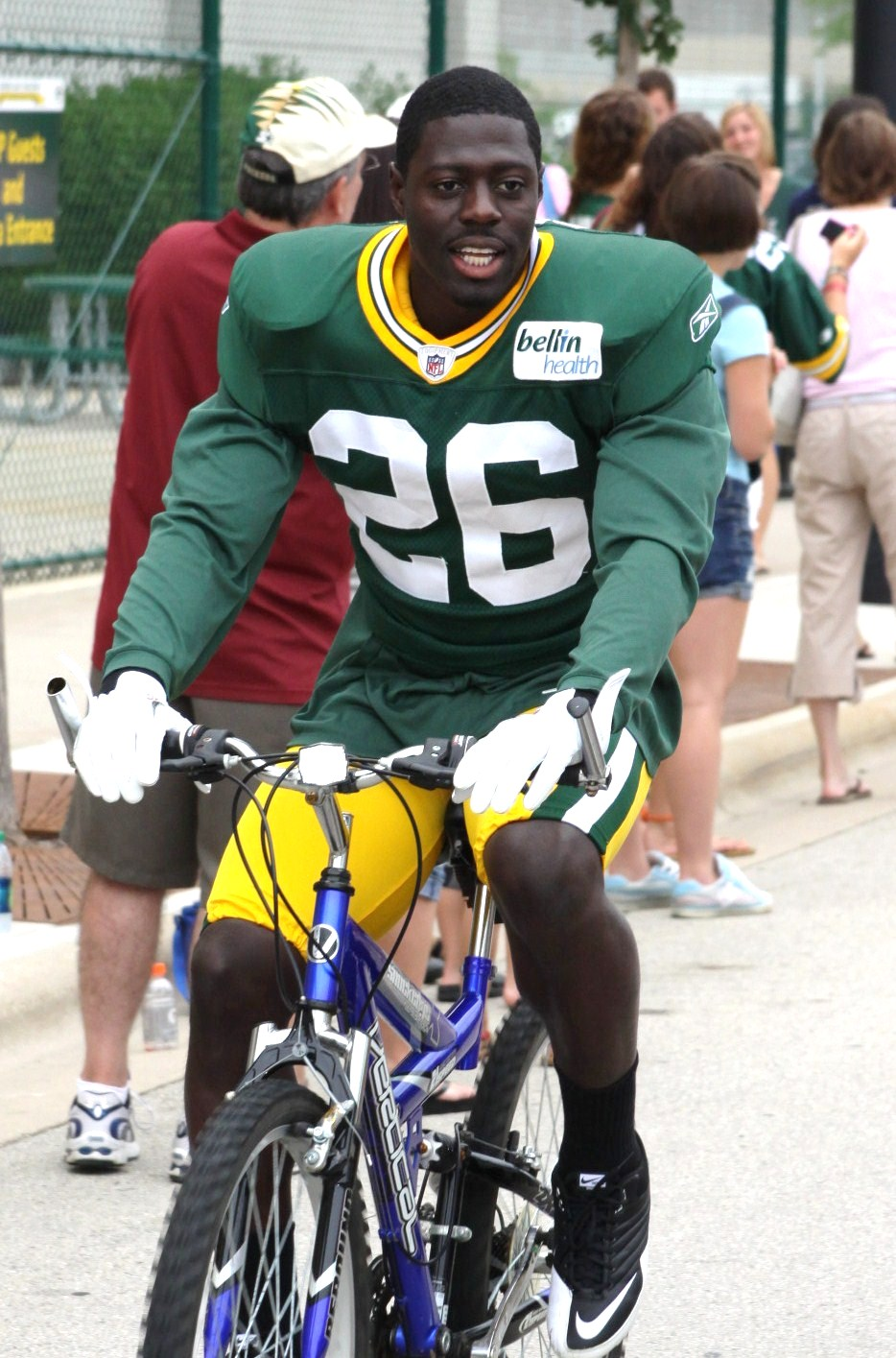
- Peprah with the Green Bay Packers in 2011

No. 26, 38
- Position: Safety

Personal information
- Born: February 24, 1983 (age 43); Fort Worth, Texas, U.S.
- Listed height: 5 ft 11 in (1.80 m)
- Listed weight: 203 lb (92 kg)

Career information
- High school: Plano East (Plano, Texas)
- College: Alabama
- NFL draft: 2006: 5th round, 158th overall pick

Career history
- New York Giants (2006)*; Green Bay Packers (2006–2008); Atlanta Falcons (2009); Green Bay Packers (2010–2011); Dallas Cowboys (2012)
- * Offseason or practice squad member only

Awards and highlights
- Super Bowl champion (XLV); Second-team All-SEC (2005)

Career NFL statistics
- Total tackles: 195
- Forced fumbles: 3
- Pass deflections: 17
- Interceptions: 8
- Defensive touchdowns: 1
- Stats at Pro Football Reference

Charles Yaw Peprah (born February 24, 1983) is an American former professional football player who was a safety in the National Football League (NFL). He played college football for the Alabama Crimson Tide. Peprah was selected by the New York Giants in the fifth round of the 2006 NFL draft. He was also a member of the Green Bay Packers, Atlanta Falcons and Dallas Cowboys. With the Packers, he won Super Bowl XLV over the Pittsburgh Steelers.

== Early life ==
Peprah is the grandson of the former military president of Ghana, general Ignatius Kutu Acheampong. Ruling in a coup d’etat in 1972, Acheampong remained in power until 1978 and was executed in 1979 after a revolution. Acheampong's daughter Elizabeth Acheampong, the last family member to see her father alive, married Josh Peprah, a member of Acheampong's army, and emigrated to Europe and then the United States.

Peprah was born in Fort Worth, Texas and has two brothers, Richard and Josh, college football players at Wyoming and Wisconsin respectively. When he was in middle school, his parents divorced, and his father returned to Ghana. Charlie Peprah attended Plano East Senior High School.

== College career ==
In 50 games with the Alabama Crimson Tide, Peprah totaled 310 tackles (163 solo), nine interceptions (returned two for touchdowns), five fumble recoveries, four forced fumbles, and 24 passes defensed.

Peprah played various positions for Alabama including right cornerback and safety. In 2004, he was an Academic All-SEC selection, and as a senior in 2005, he was a second-team All-SEC pick. At the 2004 Music City Bowl, he recorded a season-high 11 tackles, 10 of which were solo, but Alabama lost to Minnesota.

At the 2006 Cotton Bowl Classic, he had three tackles and a pass defense against Texas Tech, and Alabama won 13–10. He graduated from Alabama with a bachelor's degree in marketing and master's degree in financial planning.

== Professional career ==
Pre-draft measurables
Height	Weight	Arm length	Hand span	40-yard dash	10-yard split	20-yard split	20-yard shuttle	Three-cone drill	Vertical jump	Broad jump	Bench press
5 ft 10 7/8 in (1.80 m)	206 lb (93 kg)	31 3/4 in (0.81 m)	9 1/2 in (0.24 m)	4.55 s	1.64 s	2.74 s	4.09 s	6.69 s	37.5 in (0.95 m)	9 ft 11 in (3.02 m)	17 reps
All values from NFL Combine/Pro Day

=== New York Giants ===
The New York Giants selected Peprah in the fifth round of the 2006 NFL draft with the 158th overall pick.

=== Green Bay Packers (first stint) ===
On September 3, 2006, Peprah was claimed off waivers by the Green Bay Packers.

Peprah played eight games for the Packers and four preseason games for the Giants. On December 10 against the San Francisco 49ers, Peprah ran down Brandon Williams, stopping his punt return at 25 yards. On December 31 against the Chicago Bears, Peprah pushed Bernard Berrian out of bounds after Berrian completed a punt return for seven yards.

In his second season with the Packers, Peprah played for all 16 regular season and two playoff games for the Packers. Peprah forced a fumble from kick returner Ahmad Bradshaw in the September 16 match against Peprah's former team New York Giants. Tracy White recovered the fumble, and the Packers later scored a touchdown and won the game 35–13. On November 22 against the Detroit Lions, Peprah made the first stops of his career with two solo tackles and overall in the season made three special teams tackles.

With one start, Peprah played 13 games in 2008 with 19 tackles, two passes defensed, and nine stops on special teams.

=== Atlanta Falcons ===
On November 4, 2009, Peprah signed as a free agent to the Atlanta Falcons and played two games with Atlanta on special teams.

=== Green Bay Packers (second stint) ===
The Packers re-signed Peprah on April 26, 2010. After playing on special teams on weeks 1 and 2, Peprah spent the third and fourth games of the season sidelined by a thigh injury. In the October 31 game against the New York Jets, Peprah made five tackles and a quarterback pressure, broke up consecutive Jets passes, and knock the ball out of Jerricho Cotchery's possession on a fourth down running attempt.

Peprah was the leading tackler for the Packers in Super Bowl XLV, a 31–25 victory over the Pittsburgh Steelers. Peprah recorded 10 tackles (9 solo). He was the only player in the game to record double digit tackles.

On March 4, 2011, the Packers re-signed Peprah to a 2-year, $2.5 million deal. On November 6, he recorded his first interception return for a touchdown in a game against the San Diego Chargers. On July 25, 2012, he was released after he failed a physical with an injured knee.

=== Dallas Cowboys ===
On October 23, 2012, he was signed by the Dallas Cowboys to provide depth at the safety position and to replace an injured Matt Johnson. He wasn't re-signed after the season.

== NFL career statistics ==
Legend
**Bold**	Career high

=== Regular season ===
Year	Team	Games		Tackles					Interceptions					Fumbles			
Year	Team	GP	GS	Cmb	Solo	Ast	Sck	TFL	Int	Yds	TD	Lng	PD	FF	FR	Yds	TD
2006	GNB	8	0	3	2	1	0.0	0	0	0	0	0	0	0	0	0	0
2007	GNB	**16**	0	11	11	0	0.0	0	0	0	0	0	0	**2**	0	0	0
2008	GNB	13	1	12	10	2	0.0	0	0	0	0	0	0	0	0	0	0
2009	ATL	2	0	1	1	0	0.0	0	0	0	0	0	0	0	0	0	0
2010	GNB	14	11	63	46	17	0.0	**3**	2	0	0	0	5	0	0	0	0
2011	GNB	**16**	**14**	**94**	**65**	**29**	0.0	**3**	**5**	**147**	**1**	**76**	**10**	1	0	0	0
2012	DAL	5	1	11	7	4	0.0	0	1	27	0	27	2	0	0	0	0
		74	27	195	142	53	0.0	6	8	174	1	76	17	3	0	0	0

=== Playoffs ===
Year	Team	Games		Tackles					Interceptions					Fumbles			
Year	Team	GP	GS	Cmb	Solo	Ast	Sck	TFL	Int	Yds	TD	Lng	PD	FF	FR	Yds	TD
2007	GNB	2	0	1	0	1	0.0	0	0	0	0	0	0	0	0	0	0
2010	GNB	**4**	**2**	**24**	**17**	**7**	0.0	0	0	0	0	0	0	0	0	0	0
2011	GNB	1	1	9	9	0	0.0	**1**	0	0	0	0	0	0	0	0	0
		7	3	34	26	8	0.0	1	0	0	0	0	0	0	0	0	0

== Scouting career ==
In 2016, Peprah was hired by the Green Bay Packers as a scouting assistant. Peprah was promoted to college scout in July 2017.
