= Sampson Genus =

American football player (born 1988)

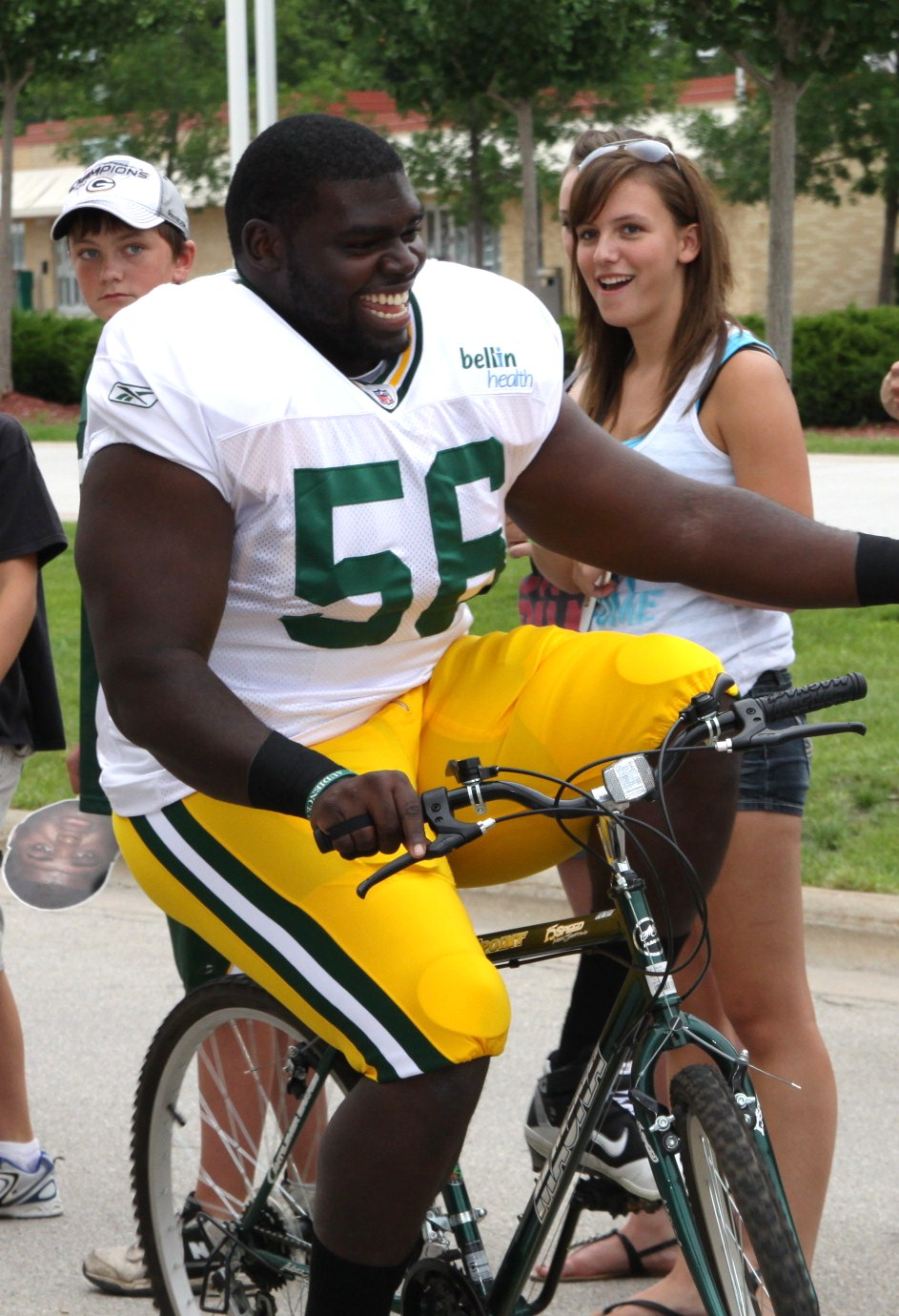
- Sampson Genus

No. 65, 56
- Position: Center

Personal information
- Born: May 2, 1988 (age 38); Lake City, Florida
- Listed height: 6 ft 1 in (1.85 m)
- Listed weight: 315 lb (143 kg)

Career information
- High school: Columbia (Lake City, Florida)
- College: South Florida
- NFL draft: 2011: undrafted

Career history
- Green Bay Packers (2011–2012)*; Virginia Destroyers (2012)
- * Offseason or practice squad member only

Awards and highlights
- All-Big East First-team (2010); All-Big East Second-team (2009)
- Stats at Pro Football Reference

Sampson Maurice Genus (/ˈdʒiːnəs/ JEE-nəs; born May 2, 1988) is an American former football center. Genus was signed after going undrafted at the 2011 NFL draft despite being one of the highest rated prospects at center.

A native of Lake City, Florida, Genus attended Columbia High School, where he earned Gainesville Sun All-Area First-team honors as a junior and senior. He was selected to Florida’s North-South Shrine Bowl in 2007. Regarded as a two-star recruit by Scout.com, Genus was listed the No. 32 center prospect in the class of 2007.

As a true freshman at South Florida, he saw action in six games. For his sophomore season, he was moved to defensive tackle, where he played in all 13 games and started in five, collecting nine tackles, two assisted and seven solo. It was the only year since Genus started playing organized football at the age of 7 that he didn't play center.

Moved back to offensive line after the season, Genus started all games of the 2009 season at center, except for the regular-season finale against UConn, which he missed due to an ankle injury. He earned 2009 All-Big East Conference second-team honors. He spent time with the Green Bay Packers in the National Football League and with the Virginia Destroyers in the United Football League.
