= Ray Dominguez =

American football player (born 1988)

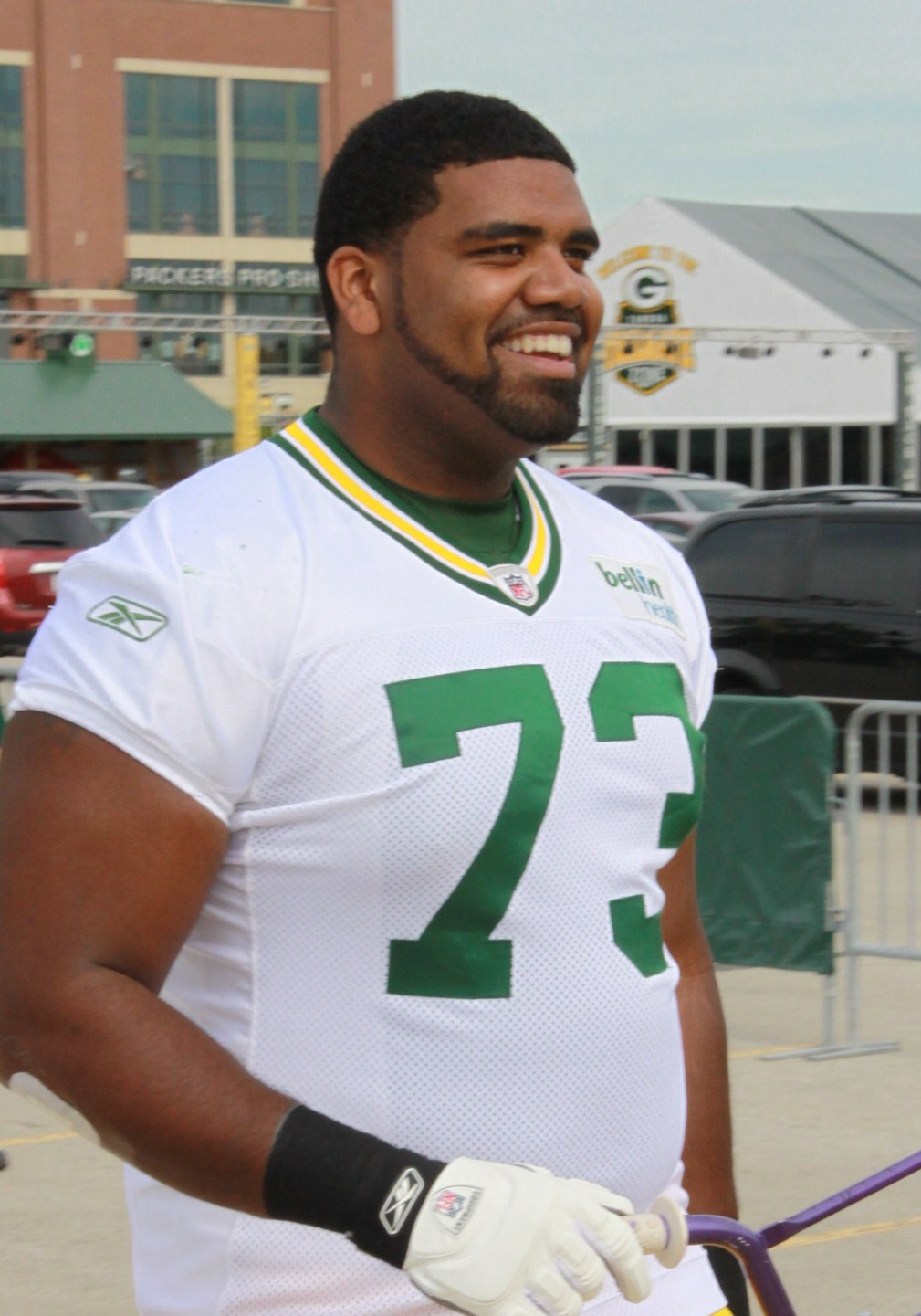

No. 73
- Position: Offensive tackle

Personal information
- Born: July 12, 1988 (age 38); Bainbridge, Georgia, U.S.
- Listed height: 6 ft 4 in (1.93 m)
- Listed weight: 325 lb (147 kg)

Career information
- High school: Bainbridge (GA)
- College: Arkansas
- NFL draft: 2011: undrafted

Career history
- Green Bay Packers (2011–2012); Carolina Panthers (2012)*; Dallas Cowboys (2013)*; Orlando Predators (2015)
- * Offseason or practice squad member only
- Stats at Pro Football Reference

Ray Anthony Dominguez (born July 12, 1988) is an American former football offensive tackle. He was signed by the Packers as an undrafted free agent in 2011. He played college football at Arkansas.

On October 12, 2011, he was signed to the Packers active roster from the practice squad.
