= Scott Wells (American football) =

American football player (born 1981)

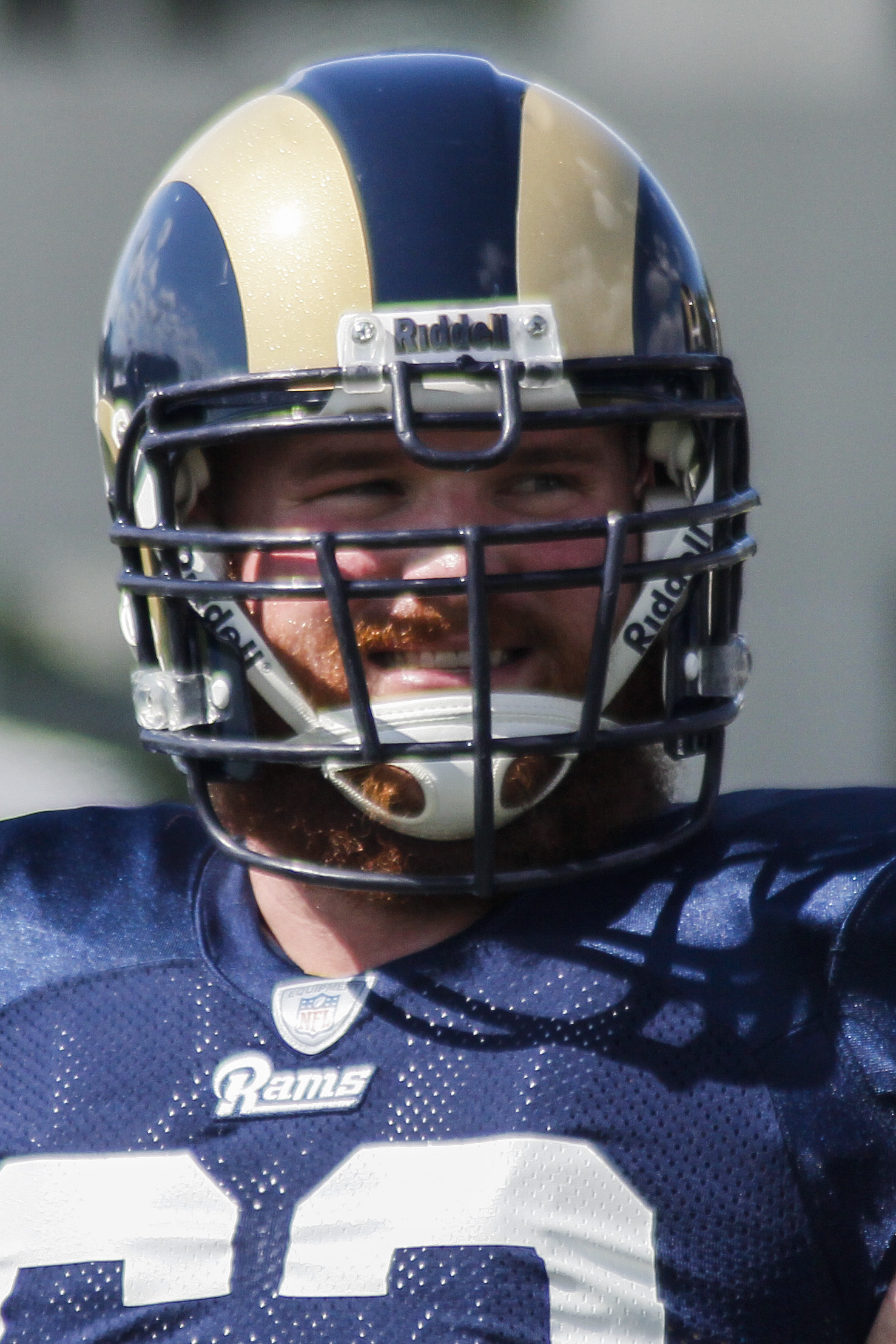
- Wells with the St. Louis Rams in 2013

No. 63
- Position: Center

Personal information
- Born: January 17, 1981 (age 45); West, Texas, U.S.
- Listed height: 6 ft 2 in (1.88 m)
- Listed weight: 302 lb (137 kg)

Career information
- High school: Brentwood Academy (Brentwood, Tennessee)
- College: Tennessee (1999–2003)
- NFL draft: 2004: 7th round, 251st overall pick

Career history
- Green Bay Packers (2004–2011); St. Louis Rams (2012–2014)

Awards and highlights
- Super Bowl champion (XLV); Pro Bowl (2011); First-team All-SEC (2003)

Career NFL statistics
- Games played: 146
- Games started: 135
- Fumble recoveries: 2
- Stats at Pro Football Reference

Scott Darvin Wells (born January 17, 1981) is an American former professional football player who was a center in the National Football League (NFL). He played college football for the Tennessee Volunteers, and was selected by the Green Bay Packers in the seventh round of the 2004 NFL draft. He won Super Bowl XLV with the Packers.

== Early life ==
Wells's father was in the ministry of the Churches of Christ, and Wells began playing football in Crowley, Texas, before the family moved to a congregation in Pennsylvania, where Wells spent his freshman and sophomore years at Brookville Area High School; he finished his high school career at Brentwood Academy in Tennessee. Wells played offensive guard, defensive end, and nose tackle. He was a PrepStar and CNN/Sports Illustrated All America selection along with earning the Division II Class A 'Mr. Football' in 1998.

Wells also excelled on the wrestling mat, winning two Tennessee state titles in the 275-pound weight class, going undefeated during his junior and senior years.

== College career ==
Wells played college football at the University of Tennessee. While playing at Tennessee during 2000–2003, he was a four-year letter winner.

== Professional career ==
Pre-draft measurables
Height	Weight	Arm length	Hand span	40-yard dash	10-yard split	20-yard split	20-yard shuttle	Three-cone drill	Vertical jump	Broad jump	Bench press
6 ft 1 7/8 in (1.88 m)	300 lb (136 kg)	31 5/8 in (0.80 m)	9 3/4 in (0.25 m)	5.24 s	1.77 s	3.00 s	4.35 s	7.56 s	31.0 in (0.79 m)	9 ft 1 in (2.77 m)	31 reps
All values from NFL Combine

=== Green Bay Packers ===
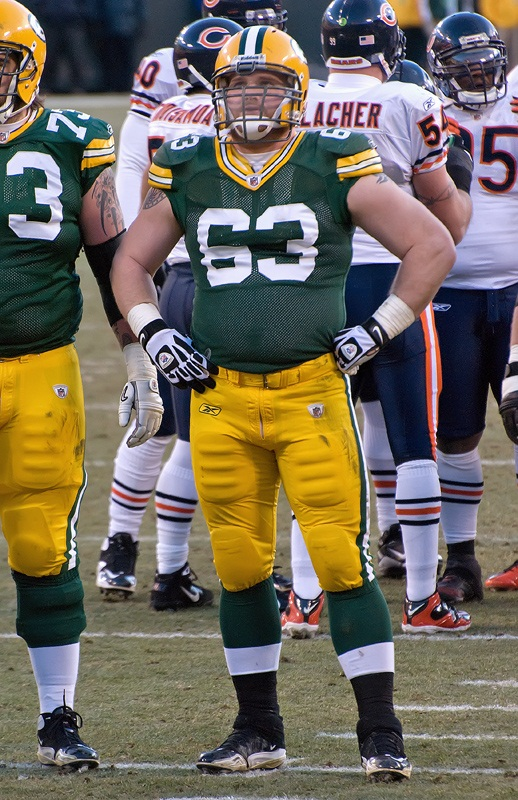
Wells playing for the Green Bay Packers

Wells was selected by the Green Bay Packers in the seventh round, pick 251, of the 2004 NFL draft.

On September 5, 2004, Wells was waived by the Green Bay Packers but was signed to their practice squad two-days later on September 7.

On October 2, 2004, he was promoted to the active roster when Mike Flanagan was put on injured reserve.

Wells saw his first NFL regular season playing time on special teams on November 21, 2004, in Houston. He was named the starting center in the spring of 2006, and held that position until 2011, missing just one game because of an eye injury. In November 2006, Scott was given a 5-year, $15 million contract extension. At the end of the 2010 season, Wells and the Packers appeared in Super Bowl XLV. He was a starter in the 31–25 victory over the Pittsburgh Steelers. On December 26, 2011, Wells was voted to his first career Pro Bowl.

=== St. Louis Rams ===
Wells signed a 4-year $24 million deal with the St. Louis Rams on March 16, 2012. In Week 1 against the Detroit Lions on September 9, 2012, Wells fractured a metatarsal in his left foot. He also underwent arthroscopic surgery in his right knee to repair some torn cartilage.

Wells was released along with Jake Long on the eve of free agency on March 9, 2015.

== Personal life ==
Wells is married to Julie Crosthwait Wells (born 1981), and they have had a son Jackson (born 2004), a daughter Lola (born 2006), and a son Kingston (born 2010). The couple had lost premature twin sons, Deacon Scott Wells and Maddox Scott Wells as a result of stillbirth on November 24, 2005 the year before Lola's birth. In 2012, the Wells adopted three children from Uganda, ages 2 through 5 – Caroline, Elijah, and R.J. Caroline was revealed in 2011 to be the biological sister to R.J. The Wells are actively involved in Churches of Christ.

He has earned two B.A. degrees in history and sociology.
