= Johnny Jones (American football) =

American football player (born 1988)

No. 62, 67, 64
- Position: Defensive tackle

Personal information
- Born: October 19, 1988 (age 38); Pahokee, Florida, U.S.
- Listed height: 6 ft 4 in (1.93 m)
- Listed weight: 310 lb (141 kg)

Career information
- College: Marshall
- NFL draft: 2011: undrafted

Career history
- Miami Dolphins (2011)*; Green Bay Packers (2011−2012)*; Oakland Raiders (2013)*
- * Offseason or practice squad member only
- Stats at Pro Football Reference

Johnny Jones III (born October 19, 1988) is an American former football defensive tackle. He played college football at Marshall. Jones was signed by the Miami Dolphins as an undrafted free agent in 2011. He was also a member of the Green Bay Packers and Oakland Raiders.
