= Vic So'oto =

American football player and coach (born 1987)

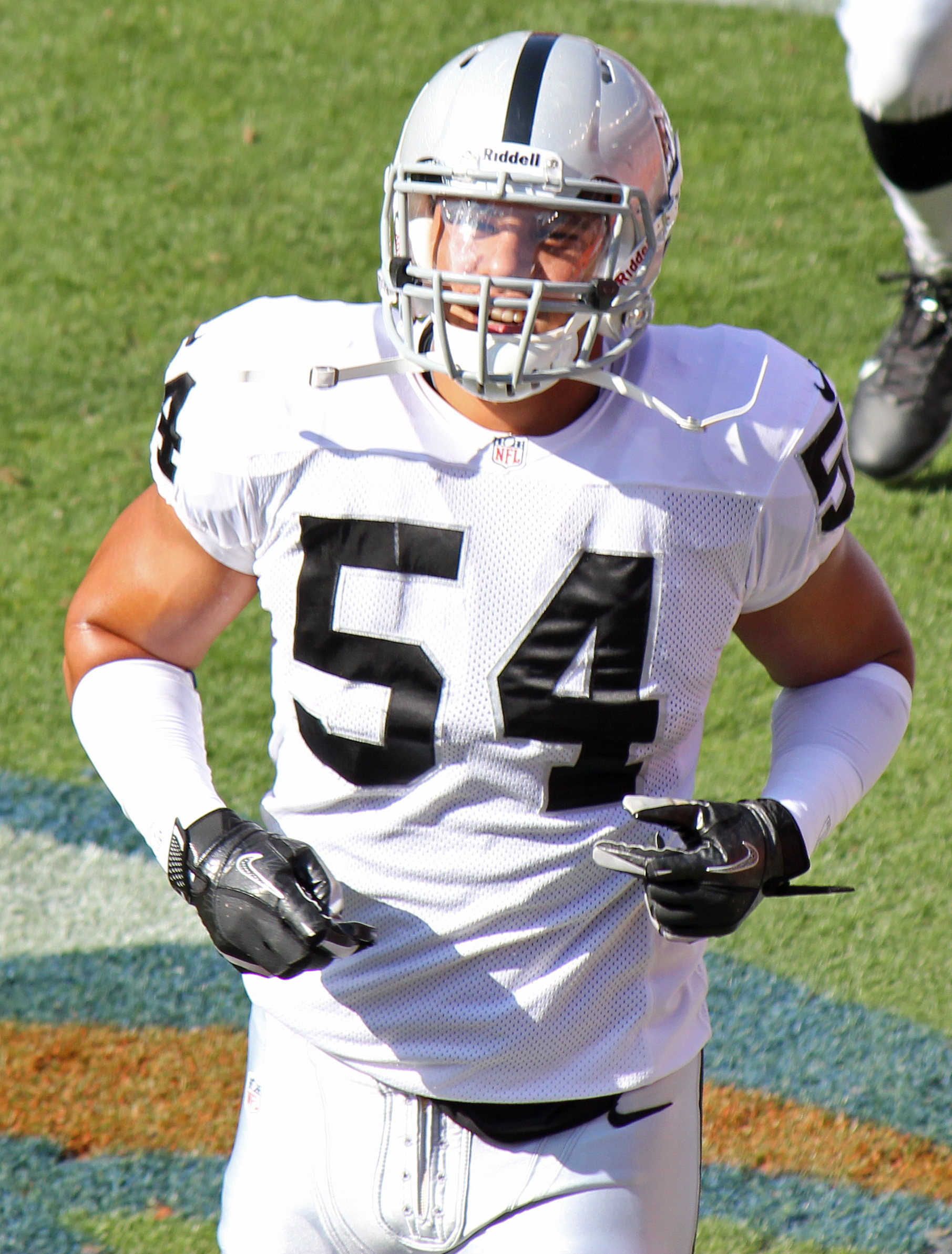
- So'oto with the Raiders in 2012

UCLA Bruins
- Title: Linebackers coach

Personal information
- Born: August 19, 1987 (age 39); Oceanside, California, U.S.
- Listed height: 6 ft 3 in (1.91 m)
- Listed weight: 263 lb (119 kg)

Career information
- High school: Carlsbad (Carlsbad, California)
- College: BYU
- NFL draft: 2011: undrafted

Career history

Playing
- Green Bay Packers (2011–2012); Oakland Raiders (2012); Green Bay Packers (2012); Washington Redskins (2012); Arizona Cardinals (2013); New Orleans Saints (2013)*; Pittsburgh Steelers (2014)*
- * Offseason or practice squad member only

Coaching
- BYU (2015) Intern; Virginia (2016) Graduate assistant; Virginia (2017–2019) Defensive line coach; USC (2020–2021) Defensive line coach; California (2022) Outside linebackers coach; California (2023–2024) Special teams coordinator & outside linebackers coach; California (2025) Co-defensive coordinator & outside linebackers coach; UCLA (2026–present) Linebackers coach

Awards and highlights
- First-team All-MWC (2010)

Career NFL statistics
- Total tackles: 8
- Sacks: 1
- Stats at Pro Football Reference

Vitale Ta'aga Magauli "Vic" So'oto (born August 19, 1987) is an American former professional football player who was a linebacker in the National Football League (NFL). He is the linebackers coach coach for UCLA Bruins. He was signed as an undrafted free agent by the Green Bay Packers in 2011. He played college football for the BYU Cougars.

He was also a member of the Oakland Raiders, Arizona Cardinals, New Orleans Saints, Washington Redskins, and Pittsburgh Steelers.

== Early life ==
So'oto attended Carlsbad High School and won three varsity letters in football and also lettered in volleyball. In football, as a senior, he was named First-team All-CIF honors and team MVP.

== College career ==
As a linebacker at Brigham Young University, So'oto finished the 2010 season with 45 tackles, (18 solo), and 5 quarterback sacks. As a senior, he was a First-team All-Mountain West Conference selection. During his career at BYU, So'oto also played at the tight end and defensive end positions. He missed the majority of the 2006 and 2008 seasons with injuries.

== Playing career ==
=== Green Bay Packers ===
On July 26, 2011, the Green Bay Packers announced they had signed So'oto as an undrafted free agent. During the pre-season, So'oto suffered a back injury and was inactive for most of the regular season but made his professional debut on special teams against the Denver Broncos in week 4. So'oto was released by the Packers on September 10, 2012.

=== Oakland Raiders ===
On September 25, 2012, the Oakland Raiders announced they had signed So'oto. He played a total of four games for the Raiders during the 2012 season before being waived by the Raiders on November 6.

=== Return to the Packers ===
The Packers re-signed So'oto to their 53-man roster on November 12, 2012. On December 11, the Packers released him and signed So'oto to their practice squad after clearing waivers two days later.

=== Washington Redskins ===
On December 19, the Washington Redskins signed So'oto from the Green Bay Packers' practice squad.

The Redskins waived him on August 31, 2013, for final roster cuts before the start of 2013 season.

=== Arizona Cardinals ===
He was signed by the Arizona Cardinals on September 24, 2013, but released after just one game with a chest injury.

=== Pittsburgh Steelers ===
So'oto signed with the Pittsburgh Steelers during the 2014 offseason, but was released on August 25, 2014.

== Coaching career ==
Beginning in 2016 So'oto served as a defensive graduate assistant at the University of Virginia under his college coach Bronco Mendenhall. On June 21, 2017, So'oto was added a full-time member of the coaching staff after Ruffin McNeill left for the University of Oklahoma.

In 2022 he became a part of the Colorado Buffaloes staff, however he left to coach for California before ever coaching a game.
