= List of Azusa Pacific Cougars head football coaches =

This is a list of Azusa Pacific Cougars head football coaches.

== Key ==
Key to symbols in coaches list
General		Overall		Conference		Postseason (Note: Although the first Rose Bowl Game was played in 1902, it has been continuously played since the 1916 game, and is recognized as the oldest bowl game by the NCAA. "—" indicates any season prior to 1916 when postseason games were not played.)	
No.	Order of coaches (Note: A running total of the number of head coaches, with coaches who served separate tenures being counted only once. Interim head coaches are represented with "Int" and are not counted in the running total. "—" indicates the team played but either without a coach or no coach is on record. "X" indicates an interim year without play.)	GC	Games coached	CW	Conference wins	PW	Postseason wins
DC	Division championships	OW	Overall wins	CL	Conference losses	PL	Postseason losses
CC	Conference championships	OL	Overall losses	CT	Conference ties	PT	Postseason ties
NC	National championships	OT	Overall ties (Note: Overtime rules in college football were introduced in 1996, making ties impossible in the period since.)	C%	Conference winning percentage		
†	Elected to the College Football Hall of Fame	O%	Overall winning percentage (Note: When computing the win–loss percentage, a tie counts as half a win and half a loss.)				

== Coaches ==
No.	Name	Term	GC	OW	OL	OT	O%	CW	CL	CT	C%	PW	PL	CCs	Awards
1	Tom Nelson	1965	7	1	6	0	.143	—	—	—	—	—	—	—	—
2	Dave Drake	1966	9	5	4	0	.556	—	—	—	—	—	—	—	—
3	John Crandall	1967–1969	26	6	19	1	.250	—	—	—	—	—	—	—	—
4	Bob Damewood	1970–1971	17	7	10	0	.412	—	—	—	—	—	—	—	—
5	Jerry Sconce	1972–1977	55	24	31	0	.436	—	—	—	—	—	—	—	—
6	Jim Milhon	1978–1994	154	81	69	4	.539	—	—	—	—	—	—	—	—
7	Vic Shealy	1995–1998	42	27	14	1	.655	—	—	—	—	4	0	—	
8	Pete Shinnick	1999–2005	75	53	22	0	.707	—	—	—	—	4	5	—	—
9	Victor Santa Cruz	2006–2019	153	84	69	0	.549	41	15	0	.732	2	4	4	
10	Rudy Carlton	2020	0	0	0	0	–	0	0	0	–	0	0	0	
