= Matt Flynn =

Matt or Matthew Flynn may refer to:

- Matt Flynn (American football) (born 1985), American football player
  - Matt Flynn Game, NFL game played on January 1st, 2012
- Matt Flynn (Australian footballer) (born 1997), Australian rules footballer
- Matt Flynn (politician) (born 1947), American politician
- Matt Flynn (musician) (born 1970), drummer for American band Maroon 5
- Matthew Flynn (born 1989), English footballer
