= 1982 Los Angeles Rams season =

NFL team season

- Owner: Georgia Frontiere
- Head coach: Ray Malavasi
- Home stadium: Anaheim Stadium

Results
- Record: 2–7
- Division place: 14th in the NFC (Would be 4th NFC West)
- Playoffs: Did not qualify

Uniform
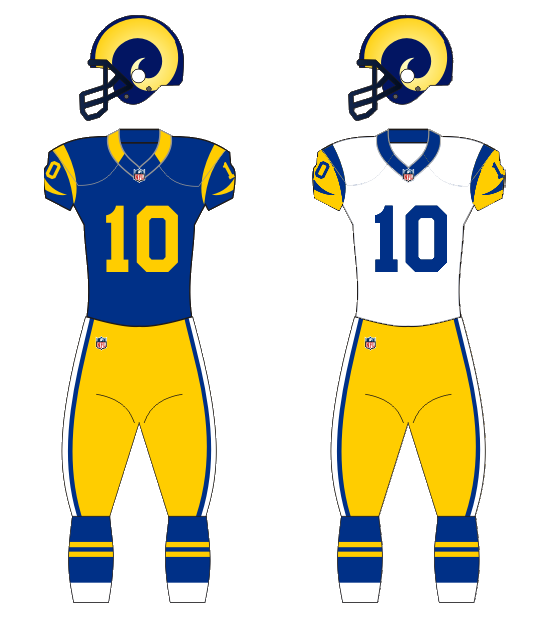

The 1982 Los Angeles Rams season was the team's 45th year with the National Football League and the 37th season in Los Angeles. The season saw the Rams attempting to improve on their 6–10 record from 1981, a result that saw them miss the playoffs for the first time since 1972. However, a players strike wiped out 7 of the team's 16 games, and shortened the season schedule to only 9 games. The team struggled early, starting 0–2 before the strike commenced. After the conclusion of the strike, the Rams finally got a win at home over the Kansas City Chiefs. However, during this game, quarterback Bert Jones was lost for the season after suffering a neck injury that ultimately led to his retirement. The Rams would lose their next four games before upsetting the 49ers in San Francisco in the season finale. The Rams would ultimately finish the season 2–7, last in their division and worst in the NFC. It was the teamʼs worst season since 1962, when they won only one game. As a result, head coach Ray Malavasi was fired after the season and replaced by John Robinson for 1983.

== Offseason ==
=== NFL draft ===
1982 Los Angeles Rams draft
Round	Pick	Player	Position	College	Notes
1	14	Barry Redden	Running back	Richmond	
3	67	Bill Bechtold	Center	Oklahoma	
4	88	Jeff Gaylord	Linebacker	Missouri	
5	117	Wally Kersten	Tackle	Minnesota	
5	118	Doug Barnett	Defensive end	Azusa Pacific	
6	145	Kerry Locklin	Tight end	New Mexico State	
7	181	Joe Shearin	Guard	Texas	Made roster in 1983
8	202	A. J. Jones	Running back	Texas	
8	207	Mike Reilly	Linebacker	Oklahoma	
9	229	Bob Speight	Tackle	Boston University	
10	256	Miles McPherson	Defensive back	New Haven	
11	285	Ricky Coffman	Wide receiver	UCLA	
12	312	Raymond Coley	Defensive tackle	Alabama A&M	
Made roster

The Rams signed free-agent and oft-injured QB Bert Jones from the Baltimore Colts. Vince Ferragamo returned from the CFL as well, and, with Pat Haden retired, the competition was between these two. Jones opened the season as the starter.

== Personnel ==
=== Staff ===
1982 Los Angeles Rams staff
Front office: Owner/President – Georgia Frontiere; Administrator of Football Operations – Jack Faulkner; Director of Player Personnel – John Math; Head coaches: Head Coach – Ray Malavasi; Offensive coaches: Offensive Coordinator/Quarterbacks – John Hadl; Running Backs – Paul Lanham; Wide Receivers – Jack Snow; Tight Ends – Fred Whittingham; Offensive Line – Jim Ringo	Defensive coaches: Defensive Coordinator/Linebackers – Herb Paterra; Defensive Line – Fritz Shurmur; Defensive Backs – Jim Vechiarella; Special teams coaches: Special Teams – Fred Whittingham; Strength and conditioning: Conditioning – Clyde Evans

=== Roster ===
1982 Los Angeles Rams roster
Quarterbacks (QB): 15 Vince Ferragamo; 17 Bert Jones; 9 Jeff Kemp; Running backs (RB): 31 Robert Alexander; 44 Mike Guman; 24 A. J. Jones; 30 Barry Redden; 33 Jewerl Thomas; 26 Wendell Tyler; Wide receivers (WR): 88 Preston Dennard; 84 George Farmer; 87 Drew Hill; 82 Willie Miller; Tight ends (TE): 86 Mike Barber; 81 Ron Battle; 83 Kerry Locklin	Offensive linemen (OL): 62 Bill Bain G; 60 Dennis Harrah G; 72 Kent Hill G; 68 Wally Kersten T; 59 George Lilja C; 78 Jackie Slater T; 56 Doug Smith C; 73 Ron Yary T; 75 Irv Pankey T; Defensive linemen (DL): 96 Doug Barnett DE; 90 Larry Brooks DT; 70 Charles DeJurnett DT; 71 Reggie Doss DE; 79 Mike Fanning DT; 76 Cody Jones DT; 67 Myron Lapka DT; 85 Jack Youngblood DE	Linebackers (LB): 52 George Andrews OLB; 54 Howard Carson MLB; 50 Jim Collins MLB; 58 Mel Owens OLB; 57 Mike Reilly OLB; 66 Eric Williams OLB; Defensive backs (DB): 42 Kirk Collins FS; 21 Nolan Cromwell FS; 47 LeRoy Irvin CB; 20 Johnnie Johnson SS; 49 Rod Perry CB; 23 Lucious Smith CB; 37 Ivory Sully CB; 27 Pat Thomas CB; Special teams (ST): 4 Mike Lansford K; 6 John Misko P	Reserve: -- Bill Bechtold C (IR); 55 Carl Ekern LB (IR); 77 Doug France T (Ret.); 69 Greg Meisner DT (IR); -- Joe Shearin G (IR); -- Bob Speight T (IR); 53 Jim Youngblood LB (IR); Rookies in italics

== Regular season ==
=== Schedule ===
Week	Date	Opponent	Result	Record	Venue	Attendance
1	September 12	at Green Bay Packers	**L** 23–35	0–1	Milwaukee County Stadium	53,693
2	September 19	Detroit Lions	**L** 14–19	0–2	Anaheim Stadium	59,470
Players' strike
3	November 21	at **Atlanta Falcons**	**L** 17–34	0–3	Atlanta–Fulton County Stadium	39,686
4	November 28	Kansas City Chiefs	**W** 20–14	1–3	Anaheim Stadium	45,793
5	December 2	**San Francisco 49ers**	**L** 24–30	1–4	Anaheim Stadium	58,574
6	December 12	Denver Broncos	**L** 24–27	1–5	Anaheim Stadium	48,112
7	December 18	at Los Angeles Raiders	**L** 31–37	1–6	Los Angeles Memorial Coliseum	56,646
8	December 26	Chicago Bears	**L** 26–34	1–7	Anaheim Stadium	46,502
9	January 2	at **San Francisco 49ers**	**W** 21–20	2–7	Candlestick Park	54,256
Note: Intra-division opponents are in **bold** text.

=== Game summaries ===
==== Week 4 ====
Team	1	2	3	4	Total
Chiefs	7	0	0	7	14
• Rams	0	14	6	0	20

- Date: November 28
- Location: Anaheim Stadium, Anaheim, California
- Game start: 1:00 p.m.
- Game weather: 60 °F or 15.6 °C, wind 7 miles per hour (11 km/h; 6.1 kn)

Scoring summary
1	KC	Billy Jackson 1 yard run (Nick Lowery kick)	Chiefs 7–0
2	LA	Wendell Tyler 1 yard run (Mike Lansford kick)	Tie 7–7
2	LA	Wendell Tyler 23 yard run (Mike Lansford kick)	Rams 14–7
3	LA	LeRoy Irvin 63 yard punt return (kick failed)	Rams 20–7
4	KC	J.T. Smith 35 yard pass from Steve Fuller (Nick Lowery kick)	Rams 20–14

== Standings ==
NFC West
	W	L	T	PCT	DIV	CONF	PF	PA	STK
Atlanta Falcons^{(5)}	5	4	0	.556	3–1	4–3	183	199	L2
New Orleans Saints	4	5	0	.444	2–1	3–5	129	160	W1
San Francisco 49ers	3	6	0	.333	1–3	2–3	209	206	L1
Los Angeles Rams	2	7	0	.222	1–2	1–5	200	250	W1

NFC
#	Team	W	L	T	PCT	PF	PA	STK
Seeded postseason qualifiers
1	Washington Redskins	8	1	0	.889	190	128	W4
2	Dallas Cowboys	6	3	0	.667	226	145	L2
3	Green Bay Packers	5	3	1	.611	226	169	L1
4 (Note: Minnesota (4–1), Atlanta (4–3), St. Louis (5–4), Tampa Bay (3–3) seeds were determined by best won-lost record in conference games.)	Minnesota Vikings	5	4	0	.556	187	198	W1
5	Atlanta Falcons	5	4	0	.556	183	199	L2
6	St. Louis Cardinals	5	4	0	.556	135	170	L1
7	Tampa Bay Buccaneers	5	4	0	.556	158	178	W3
8 (Note: Detroit finished ahead of New Orleans and the N.Y. Giants based on best conference record (4–4 to Saints’ 3–5 to Giants’ 3–5).)	Detroit Lions	4	5	0	.444	181	176	W1
Did not qualify for the postseason
9	New Orleans Saints	4	5	0	.444	129	160	W1
10	New York Giants	4	5	0	.444	164	160	W1
11 (Note: San Francisco finished ahead of Chicago, and Chicago finished ahead of Philadelphia, based on conference record (49ers’ 2–3 to Bears’ 2–5 to Eagles’ 1–5).)	San Francisco 49ers	3	6	0	.333	209	206	L1
12	Chicago Bears	3	6	0	.333	141	174	L1
13	Philadelphia Eagles	3	6	0	.333	191	195	L1
14	Los Angeles Rams	2	7	0	.222	200	250	W1
Tiebreakers

== See also ==
Other Anaheim–based teams in 1982

- California Angels (Anaheim Stadium)
  - 1982 California Angels season
