= 1998 college football season =

The 1998 college football season may refer to:

- 1998 NCAA Division I-A football season
- 1998 NCAA Division I-AA football season
- 1998 NCAA Division II football season
- 1998 NCAA Division III football season
- 1998 NAIA football season
