= 2013 Victory Bowl =

Greenville Panthers	Azusa Pacific Cougars
(9–1)	(9–2)
0	67
Head coach: Robbie Schomaker	Head coach: Victor Santa Cruz
	1	2	3	4	Total
Greenville	0	0	0	0	0
Azusa Pacific	21	23	17	6	67
- Date: November 23, 2013
- Season: 2013
- Stadium: Barron Stadium
- Location: Rome, Georgia
- MVP: Offense: Terrell Watson; Defense: Jonathan Uperesa
- Referee: D. Whitehead
- Attendance: 1,250

The 2013 Victory Bowl was a college football bowl game played on November 23, 2013, at Barron Stadium in Rome, Georgia. It featured the Azusa Pacific Cougars against the Greenville Panthers. The Cougars trounced the Panthers, 67–0. Azusa Pacific is an NCAA Division II school, while Greenville plays in Division III. Azusa Pacific (APU) set a record for the most points scored in a Victory Bowl in their first appearance, which was also the only shutout in the game's history. APU outgained Greenville 388 yards to 111 and scored nine touchdowns.

== Game play ==
=== First quarter ===
Azusa Pacific jumped out to a 21–0 lead on two touchdown runs by Terrell Watson and one by Justin McPherson. Greenville went three-and-out four times in the quarter for zero total net yards.

=== Second quarter ===
Watson got his third score of the game early in the quarter on an eight-yard TD run. Tanner Henry and Ed Dillihunt caught touchdown passes from Dasmen Stewart later in the quarter before Jamie Cacciatore's 42-yard field goal as time expired made the score 44–0 at halftime.

=== Third quarter ===
Stewart opened the quarter with another TD pass to Henry before Cacciatore connected on a 25-yard field goal. Sam Flemming intercepted Greenville quarterback Brendan Chambers for a 48-yard return touchdown to extend the lead to 61–0.

=== Fourth quarter ===
Tarik Myles broke free for a 71-yard run on the Cougars' first drive to get to the Greenville 10. McPherson ran three times on the next series, punching in a one-yard touchdown on fourth down. The PAT was blocked, making the score 67–0.

=== Scoring Summary ===
Scoring summary

Quarter	Time	Drive			Team	Scoring information	Score	
Quarter	Time	Plays	Yards	TOP	Team	Scoring information	Greenville Panthers	Azusa Pacific Cougars
1	11:17	5	37	1:53	Azusa Pacific Cougars	Terrell Watson 1-yard touchdown run, Jamie Cacciatore kick Good	0	7
1	4:59	7	30	4:06	Azusa Pacific Cougars	Justin McPherson 8-yard touchdown run, Jamie Cacciatore kick Good	0	14
1	2:16	2	42	0:51	Azusa Pacific Cougars	Terrell Watson 37-yard touchdown run, Jamie Cacciatore kick Good	0	21
2	9:41	1	8	0:06	Azusa Pacific Cougars	Terrell Watson 8-yard touchdown run, Jamie Cacciatore kick Good	0	28
2	4:11	6	46	3:35	Azusa Pacific Cougars	Tanner Henry 9-yard touchdown reception from Dasmen Stewart, Jamie Cacciatore kick Failed	0	34
2	1:17	2	14	0:50	Azusa Pacific Cougars	Ed Dillihunt 18-yard touchdown reception from Dasmen Stewart, Jamie Cacciatore kick Good	0	41
2	0:00	1	0	0	Azusa Pacific Cougars	42-yard field goal by Jamie Cacciatore	0	44
3	9:11	9	79	5:48	Azusa Pacific Cougars	Tanner Henry 4-yard touchdown reception from Dasmen Stewart, Jamie Cacciatore kick Failed	0	51
3	6:10	6	20	2:48	Azusa Pacific Cougars	25-yard field goal by Jamie Cacciatore	0	54
3	3:46	-	-	-	Azusa Pacific Cougars	Interception returned 48 yards for touchdown by Sam Flemming, Jamie Cacciatore kick Good	0	61
4	9:37	5	81	3:14	Azusa Pacific Cougars	Justin McPherson 1-yard touchdown run, Jamie Cacciatore kick Blocked	0	67
"TOP" = time of possession. For other American football terms, see Glossary of American football.							Greenville Panthers	Azusa Pacific Cougars
