= 1998 NAIA Football Championship Series =

1998 NAIA Football Championship
	1st	2nd	3rd	4th	Total
Olivet Nazarene	7	7	0	0	14
Azusa Pacific Cougars	0	7	0	10	17
- Date: December 19, 1998
- Stadium: Jim Carroll Stadium
- City: Savannah, Tennessee
- MOP (Offense): Jack Williams, Azusa Pacific
- MOP (Defense): Greg Reid, Olivet Nazarene
- Attendance: 5,000

The 1998 NAIA football championship series concluded on December 19, 1998, with the championship game played at Jim Carroll Stadium in Savannah, Tennessee. It was the second championship game under a reunified single division NAIA Season. The game was won by the Azusa Pacific Cougars over the Olivet Nazarene Tigers by a score of 17–14.

== Scoring Summary ==
Scoring summary

Quarter	Time	Drive			Team	Scoring information	Score	
Quarter	Time	Plays	Yards	TOP	Team	Scoring information	Olivet Nazarene Tigers	Azusa Pacific Cougars
1	10:50	9	64	3:36	Olivet Nazarene Tigers	Hollist Brown 1-yard touchdown run, Chad Martin kick Good	7	0
2	11:14	6	81	2:23	Azusa Pacific Cougars	Dexter Davis 1-yard touchdown reception from Geoff Buffum, Jim Daichendt kick Good	7	7
2	1:00	7	64	1:32	Olivet Nazarene Tigers	Jon Ross 42-yard touchdown reception from Brad Odgers, Chad Martin kick Good	14	7
4	10:16	-	-	-	Azusa Pacific Cougars	Team Safety	14	9
4	8:34	5	46	1:42	Azusa Pacific Cougars	Jack Williams 4-yard touchdown run, 2-point Jack Williams Pass Good	14	17
"TOP" = time of possession. For other American football terms, see Glossary of American football.							Olivet Nazarene Tigers	Azusa Pacific Cougars
