= 1982 Los Angeles Rams–Green Bay Packers game =

Notable American football game

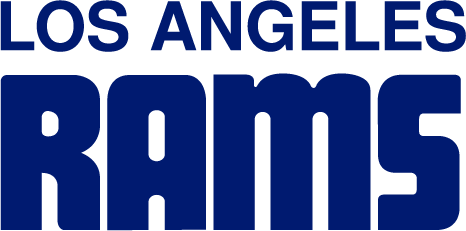
Los Angeles Rams (0–0)	Green Bay Packers (0–0)
23	35
Head coach: Ray Malavasi	Head coach: Bart Starr
	1	2	3	4	Total
LAR	10	13	0	0	23
GB	0	0	14	21	35
- Date: September 12, 1982
- Stadium: Milwaukee County Stadium; Milwaukee, Wisconsin, US
- Attendance: 53,694

TV in the United States
- Network: CBS
- Announcers: Jack Buck and Hank Stram

The Los Angeles Rams played an American football game against the Green Bay Packers in Week 1 of the 1982 National Football League (NFL) season on September 12, 1982, at Milwaukee County Stadium in Milwaukee, Wisconsin, United States. The recent history of each team differed greatly: the Rams had missed the playoffs in 1981 for the first time in eight seasons, while the Packers had not been to the playoffs since 1972 and had not won a playoff game since 1967. The Rams began the game strong, scoring 23 points in the first half, while shutting the Packers out. The Rams took advantage of five Packers' first half turnovers.

The game swung wildly towards the Packers in the second half though. Quarterback Lynn Dickey led the Packers to 35 unanswered points off of five touchdown drives. The Packers defense held the Rams to just four first downs in the second half, while intercepting the Rams twice and forcing a fumble. The 23-point comeback was the largest by the Packers up to that point, but was later matched in 2013 in a game against the Dallas Cowboys. The game has been mentioned multiple times as one of the best in the history of the Rams versus the Packers.

== Background ==
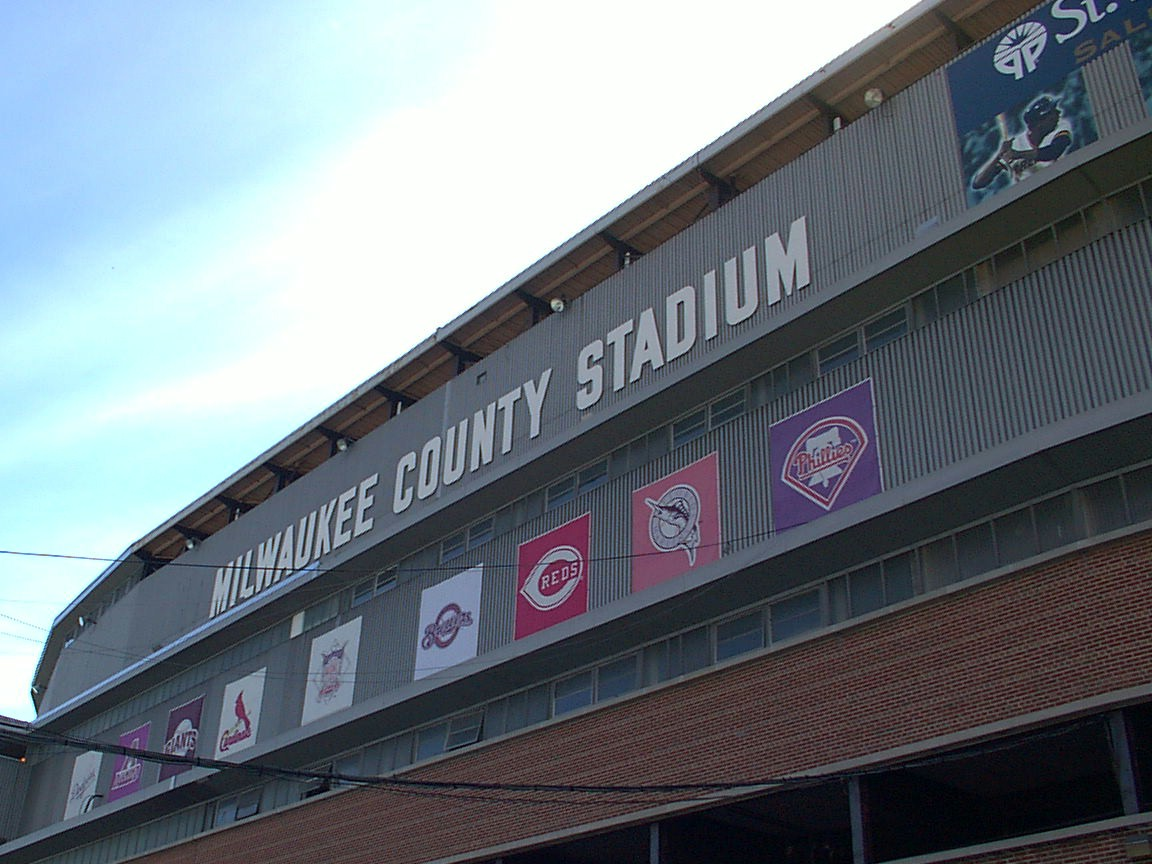
Milwaukee County Stadium was the site of the Rams and Packers Week 1 game.

The Los Angeles Rams and Green Bay Packers entered the 1982 National Football League season under vastly different circumstances. Although the Rams missed the playoffs in 1981 for the first time in eight seasons, they had been perennial contenders for most of the 1970s. The Packers, on the other hand, had not made the playoffs since 1972 and had not won a playoff game since 1967, under Vince Lombardi. Bart Starr, who had quarterbacked the Packers during the Lombardi era, was brought in as head coach to try to revive the Packers' success of the 1960s. However, Starr accumulated a record of 39–65–2 in his first seven seasons, the worst record of any head coach in league history through their first seven seasons. In 1981, the Packers went 8–8, however they missed out on the playoffs by losing the last game of the season to the New York Jets, 28–3. Starr signed a contract extension in the offseason based on the team's strong finish, having gone 6–2 in their last eight games. Going into 1982, the Packers offense was led by Lynn Dickey, James Lofton, and John Jefferson. After missing the playoffs in 1981, the Rams brought in veteran players, signing quarterback Bert Jones and tight end Mike Barber. The Rams travelled to Milwaukee County Stadium in Milwaukee, Wisconsin, for their Week 1 match-up against the Packers on September 12, 1982. The game was played in Milwaukee instead of Green Bay due to scheduling conflicts later in the year with the Milwaukee Brewers.

== Game summary ==
=== First half ===
The Rams dominated the first half of the game, taking advantage of three Packers' turnovers to take a commanding lead into halftime. In the first quarter, Gerry Ellis fumbled the ball on a short run, which was returned by the Rams to mid-field. After a 22-yard pass from Jones to Wendell Tyler moved the Rams close, Tyler took a short rush into the end zone to put the Rams up 7–0. Another Packers fumble, this time by Dickey while he was avoiding the Rams' pass rush, set-up another score. The Rams thought they scored a touchdown on the drive, but an offensive penalty forced them to accept a short field goal attempt, which was converted by Mike Lansford to increase the lead to 10–0. With the Packers still unable to do much on offense, the Rams scored again. After a 43-yard pass from Jones to Willie Miller put the Rams in scoring position, Jones completed an eight-yard pass to Barber for a touchdown, bringing the score to 17–0. The Rams had two more scoring drives, each ending in a Lansford field goal. The first was set-up by a long punt return, while the second came after Dickey threw an interception to Carl Ekern. The Rams took a 23–0 into halftime.

=== Second half ===
The Packers returned the favor, dominating the Rams in the second half by scoring 35 unanswered points. The Packers had their first score on a short touchdown pass from Dickey to Paul Coffman. The Packers moved into scoring position after a defensive pass interference penalty gave the Packers 28 yards. The Packers struck again, this time on a short run from Eddie Lee Ivery for a touchdown. The key play of the drive was a 42-yard pass completion from Dickey to Coffman. By the end of the third quarter, the Packers had cut the Rams lead to 23–14. At the beginning of the fourth quarter, the Rams were stopped by the Packers defense and attempted a long field goal, which Lansford missed. On the ensuing drive, Dickey completed a 50-yard pass to Jefferson. A few plays later, Dickey threw his second touchdown pass, a 15-yard completion to Lofton. With the score now 23–21, the Packers kicked off to the Rams. However, on the kick-off return, Robert Alexander fumbled the ball, which the Packers recovered at the 10-yard line. On the next play, Dickey threw a 10-yard touchdown pass to Coffman to give the Packers their first lead, 28–23. The Packers sealed their comeback victory with a 27-yard rushing touchdown by Ivery with about three minutes left in the game. The Packers won 35–23.

=== Box score ===
Los Angeles Rams vs. Green Bay Packers – Game summary

Quarter	1	2	3	4	Total
Rams	10	13	0	0	23
Packers	0	0	14	21	35

at Milwaukee County Stadium, Milwaukee, Wisconsin

- Game time: 1:00 p.m. CST
- Game weather: 73 °F (23 °C), wind
- Game attendance: 53,694
- TV announcers (CBS): Jack Buck and Hank Stram
- Sources: Pro-Football-Reference.com and The Los Angeles Times

Game information

First quarter

- LA – Wendell Tyler 4-yard rush (Mike Lansford kick), 5:51. Rams 7–0. Drive: 4 plays, 42 yards.
- LA – Mike Lansford 32-yard field goal, 1:54. Rams 10–0. Drive: 6 plays, 6 yards.

Second quarter

- LA – Mike Barber 8-yard pass from Bert Jones (Mike Lansford kick), 12:43. Rams 17–0. Drive: 5 plays, 51 yards.
- LA – Mike Lansford 20-yard field goal, 1:38. Rams 20–0. Drive: 3 plays, 5 yards.
- LA – Mike Lansford 28-yard field goal, 0:00. Rams 23–0. Drive: 5 plays, 26 yards.

Third quarter

- GB – Paul Coffman 10-yard pass from Lynn Dickey (Jan Stenerud kick), 10:39. Rams 23–7. Drive: 5 plays, 55 yards.
- GB – Eddie Lee Ivery 3-yard rush (Jan Stenerud kick), 6:03. Rams 23–14. Drive: 3 plays, 47 yards.

Fourth quarter

- GB – James Lofton 15-yard pass from Lynn Dickey (Jan Stenerud kick), 11:29. Rams 23–21. Drive: 5 plays, 66 yards.
- GB – Paul Coffman 10-yard pass from Lynn Dickey (Jan Stenerud kick), 11:12. Packers 28–23. Drive: 1 play, 10 yards.
- GB – Eddie Lee Ivery 27-yard rush (Jan Stenerud kick), 3:06. Packers 35–23. Drive: 5 plays, 66 yards.

Los Angeles Rams stats

Passing

- Bert Jones – 17/31, 202 yards, 1 touchdown, 2 interceptions

Rushing

- Wendell Tyler – 14 rushes, 57 yards, 1 touchdown
- Mike Guman – 7 rushes, 21 yards
- Bert Jones – 2 rushes, 16 yards
- Jewerl Thomas – 2 rushes, 4 yards
- Barry Redden – 2 rushes, 2 yards

Receiving

- Mike Guman – 4 receptions, 37 yards
- Jewerl Thomas – 4 receptions, 28 yards
- Willie Miller – 3 receptions, 78 yards
- Wendell Tyler – 3 receptions, 32 yards
- Barry Redden – 1 receptions, 11 yards
- Preston Dennard – 1 reception, 8 yards
- Mike Barber – 1 reception, 8 yards, 1 touchdown
Green Bay Packers stats

Passing

- Lynn Dickey – 17/27, 233 yards, 3 touchdowns, 3 interceptions

Rushing

- Eddie Lee Ivery – 17 rushes, 109 yards, 2 touchdowns
- Mike Meade – 9 rushes, 28 yards
- Del Rodgers – 4 rushes, 14 yards
- Gerry Ellis – 1 rushes, 7 yards
- James Lofton – 1 rushes, -4 yards

Receiving

- John Jefferson – 6 receptions, 116 yards
- Paul Coffman – 4 receptions, 66 yards, 2 touchdowns
- James Lofton – 4 receptions, 59 yards, 1 touchdown
- Mike Meade – 2 receptions, -4 yards
- Gerry Ellis – 1 reception, 0 yards

=== Analysis ===
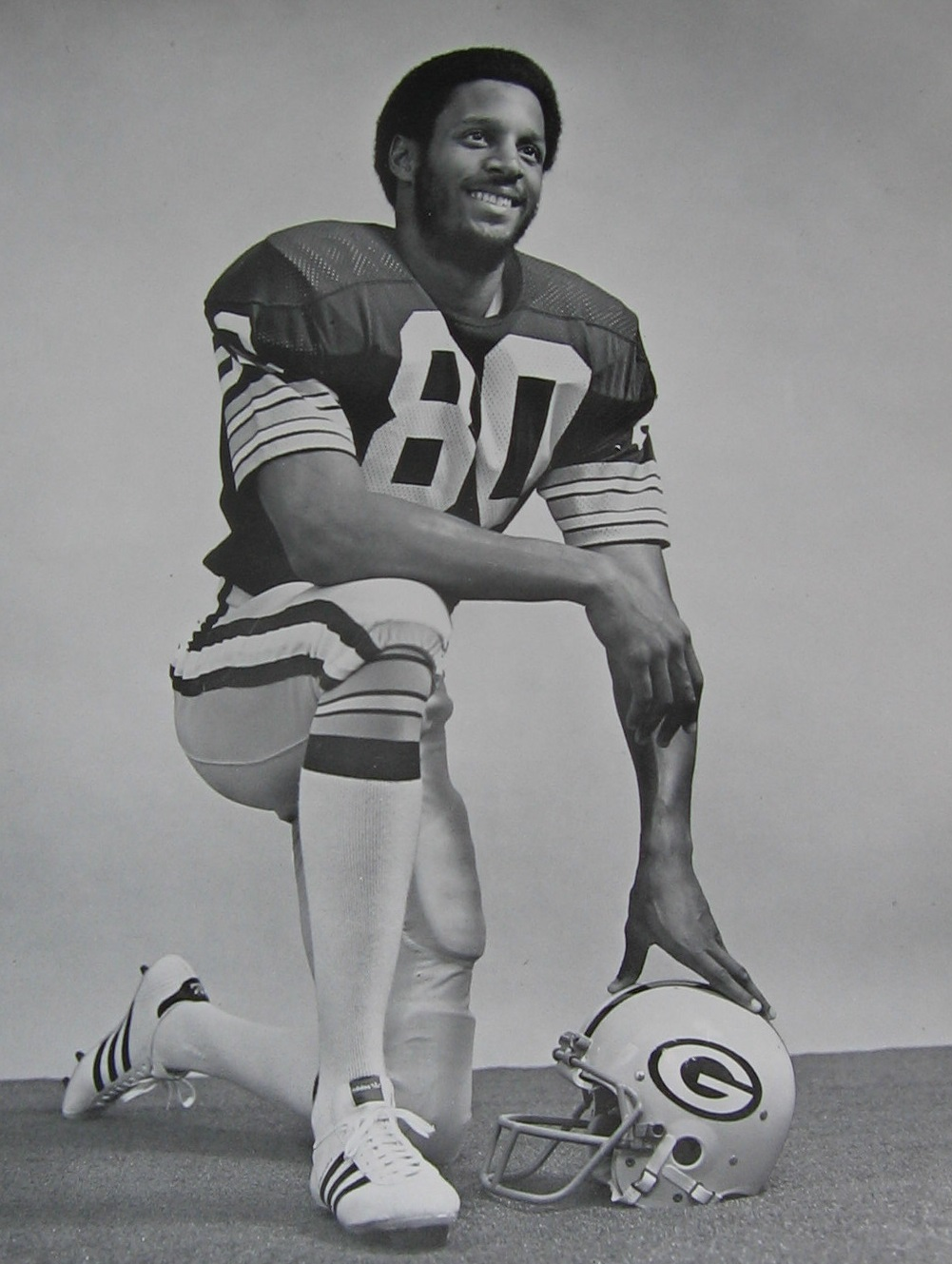
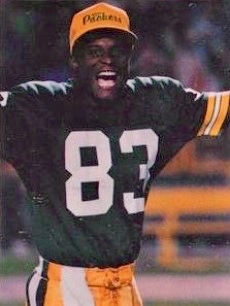
James Lofton (left) and John Jefferson (right) both had productive games, with Lofton catching a touchdown pass and Jefferson having 116 receiving yards.

Post-game analysis focused on the comeback by the Packers and the drastic change from the first half to the second half for both teams. The Packers had six total turnovers, including five in the first half, while the Rams had three. Starr noted that with Dickey's poor performance in the first half, it would have been understandable to replace him in the second half; Starr stuck with his quarterback though. On a kick-off return during the fourth quarter, a fumble allowed the Packers to score 14 points in under a minute of play. Even though the Packers lost the turnover battle, they otherwise played clean football and avoided penalties (two penalties for 15 yards); the Rams, however, had 11 penalties for 88 yards. The Packers' defense was also able to stop the Rams' running game, especially in the second half. The Packers offense exploded in the second half, leading to solid performances across the board for their offensive skill players. Dickey threw three touchdowns, two to Coffman and one to Lofton, with Jefferson leading all receivers with six catches and 116 receiving yards. Ivery rushed for 109 yards and two touchdowns after Ellis left the game due to an injury. Even though they gave up 23 points in the first half, the Packers defense was able to force three field goals during this period, helping to keep the game within reach. The defense tightened down in the second half, only giving up four first downs to the Rams, forcing three turnovers, and shutting them out. In total, the Packers outgained the Rams in yardage and first downs, while scoring 35 unanswered points.

== Outcome ==
The Packers continued their success, beating the New York Giants 27–19 the next week to start the season 2–0. The Rams, however, lost 19–14 to the Detroit Lions in Week 2 to start the season winless. On September 21, 1982, the NFL Players Association went on strike. The strike originated from the players demanding a greater share of revenue, although in the end the players settled for modest increases in salary and benefits. As a result, the season was shortened to nine games and the playoffs were expanded to the top eight teams from each conference, regardless of division. The Packers ended the season 5–3–1, making the playoffs for the first time since 1972. The Rams went 2–7 and missed out on a playoff berth. The Packers beat the St. Louis Cardinals 41–16 in the first round of the playoffs, their first postseason victory since 1967. The Packers lost in the second round of the playoffs to the Dallas Cowboys by a score of 37–26. The Rams fired head coach Ray Malavasi at the end of the season.

=== Legacy ===
The game marked the largest comeback in Packers' history at the time, besting the 18-point comeback during a 1965 regular season game against the Lions. This mark was matched 31 years later, with the Packers beating the Dallas Cowboys during a 2013 regular season game after falling behind by 23 points; multiple post-game articles referenced the Packers matching their comeback record from the Rams game. In a 2004 article, former Packers' team historian Lee Remmel identified the comeback as a key moment in the Packers history against the Rams. Two years later, in preparation for a Packers game against the Rams, Remmel provided an in-depth overview of the comeback as part of his historical coverage. In describing the game, Remmel noted the drastic change at halftime, with the Packers defense shutting the Rams out, while Dickey and the Packers offense exploded for five touchdowns. In his book chronicling the first 100 years of Packers history, Cliff Christl described the comeback against the Rams as "an inspiring and record-setting comeback" while highlighting the contributions of Dickey, Coffman, Jefferson, and Lofton. In his book Green Bay Packers: Trials, Triumphs, and Tradition, author William Povletich noted that the Packers "displayed their firepower with a spirited second-half comeback" because "their offense had found its stride, becoming as explosive as any in football". Povletich also discussed the atmosphere the game was played in revolving around the possibility of a player strike. Multiple football bloggers have also written extensively about the game.
