= Victor Santa Cruz =

American football player and coach (born 1972)

Current position
- Title: Special teams coordinator
- Team: Towson

Biographical details
- Born: April 7, 1972 (age 54)

Playing career
- 1991–1994: Hawaii
- Position: Linebacker

Coaching career (HC unless noted)
- 1996–2000: El Camino HS (CA) (LB)
- 2001–2003: Azusa Pacific (OC)
- 2004–2005: Azusa Pacific (DC)
- 2006–2019: Azusa Pacific
- 2020: Hawaii (AHC/DC)
- 2021: Hawaii (DE)
- 2023–2025: JSerra Catholic HS (CA)
- 2026–present: Towson (DB/STC)

Head coaching record
- Overall: 84–69 (college); 14–19 (high school)
- Bowls: 1–0
- Tournaments: 1–2 (NAIA playoffs); 0–2 (NCAA D-II playoffs)

Accomplishments and honors

Championships
- 4 GNAC (2013–2014, 2016, 2018)

Awards
- 3× GNAC Coach of the Year (2013–2014, 2016)

Victor Santa Cruz (born April 7, 1972) is an American college football and high school football coach and former player. He was most recently the head football coach for JSerra Catholic High School, a position he held from 2023 through the 2025 season. He was the defensive coordinator at Hawaii from 2020 to 2021. Prior to that, he was the head football coach at Azusa Pacific University in Azusa, California from 2006 to 2019.

== Playing career ==
Santa Cruz prepped at Rancho Buena Vista High School in Vista, California and played college football as a linebacker at the University of Hawaii at Manoa. He redshirted in 1990 and afterwards became a four-year letterman from 1991 to 1994 for the Hawaii Warriors.

== Coaching career ==
=== Azusa Pacific ===
After serving as an assistant coach at Azusa Pacific for five years, Santa Cruz became head coach after the 2005 season, replacing Pete Shinnick, who left to take on the task of reviving the football program at UNC Pembroke.

Santa Cruz led Azusa Pacific team to the NAIA playoffs in 2010 and 2011. In 2012, Santa Cruz led the program through its transition from NAIA to NCAA Division II. In 2013, he led the Cougars to a 10–2 season, winning the first conference championship in school history and winning the school's second national championship with a 67–0 win over the Greenville Panthers in the 2013 Victory Bowl. In 2014, Santa Cruz led the program to their first ever back to back 10 win season, posting a 10–1 record and winning their second straight conference title. Santa Cruz was named coach of the year in 2013, 2014, and 2016 by the Great Northwest Athletic Conference and in 2013 by the NCCAA. In 2016, Santa Cruz again led the Cougars to a conference title, and also earned the program's first ever berth in the NCAA Division II football playoffs. As of the end of the 2019 season, Santa Cruz's coaching record at Azusa Pacific was 84–69 (.549). He is the program's all-time leader in coaching victories, and ranks third in winning percentage.

=== Hawaii ===
On January 27, 2020, Santa Cruz was announced as the new defensive coordinator at his alma mater, Hawaii, on Todd Graham's inaugural staff. Santa Cruz helped direct a defensive unit that led the conference in takeaways and helped lead the Rainbow Warriors to a 28–14 New Mexico Bowl victory over Houston. Following the 2020 season, Santa Cruz transitioned from coaching safeties to defensive ends. The 4-2-5 War Dog defense for the 2021 season consistently created negative plays, totaling 85 tackles for loss and 34 sacks across 13 games, showcasing a unit that punched through the backfield and disrupted opposing offenses week after week while helping secure a bid to the 2021 Hawai‘i Bowl, which would later be canceled.

=== Later coaching career ===
In 2023, Santa Cruz was announced as the head football coach for JSerra Catholic High School. He hired his former offensive coordinator and quarterbacks coach Rudy Carlton for the same positions. He finished 14–18 overall in three seasons and 3–12 in Trinity League play. Santa Cruz is currently the defensive backs coach and Special Teams Coordinator at Towson University.

== Head coaching record ==
=== College ===
| Year | Team | Overall | Conference | Standing | Bowl/playoffs |
|---|---|---|---|---|---|
Azusa Pacific (NAIA independent) (2006–2011)
| 2006 | Azusa Pacific | 3–7 | | | |
| 2007 | Azusa Pacific | 6–5 | | | |
| 2008 | Azusa Pacific | 2–8 | | | |
| 2009 | Azusa Pacific | 3–8 | | | |
| 2010 | Azusa Pacific | 6–4 | | | L NAIA First Round |
| 2011 | Azusa Pacific | 9–3 | | | L NAIA Quarterfinal |
Azusa Pacific (Great Northwest Athletic Conference) (2012–2019)
| 2012 | Azusa Pacific | 4–7 | 4–6 | T–4th | |
| 2013 | Azusa Pacific | 10–2 | 9–1 | 1st | W Victory Bowl |
| 2014 | Azusa Pacific | 10–1 | 6–0 | 1st | |
| 2015 | Azusa Pacific | 6–4 | 3–3 | T–3rd | |
| 2016 | Azusa Pacific | 9–3 | 8–0 | 1st | L NCAA Division II First Round |
| 2017 | Azusa Pacific | 7–4 | 4–4 | 3rd | |
| 2018 | Azusa Pacific | 8–4 | 7–1 | T–1st | L NCAA Division II First Round |
| 2019 | Azusa Pacific | 1–9 | 1–5 | T–3rd | |
| Azusa Pacific: | | 84–69 | 42–20 | | |
| Total: | | 84–69 | | | |

=== High school ===
| Year | Team | Overall | Conference | Standing | Bowl/playoffs |
|---|---|---|---|---|---|
JSerra Catholic Lions () (2023–2025)
| 2023 | JSerra Catholic | 5–6 | 2–3 | T-3rd | L CIF-SS First Round |
| 2024 | JSerra Catholic | 6–5 | 1–4 | T-4th | L CIF-SS First Round |
| 2025 | JSerra Catholic | 3–7 | 0–5 | 6th | |
| JSerra Catholic: | | 14–19 | 3–12 | | |
| Total: | | 14–19 | | | |
