= 2013 Green Bay Packers–Dallas Cowboys game =

Notable regular season NFL game

Green Bay Packers (6–6–1)	Dallas Cowboys (7–6)
37	36
Head coach: Mike McCarthy	Head coach: Jason Garrett
	1	2	3	4	Total
GB	3	0	14	20	37
DAL	13	13	3	7	36
- Date: December 15, 2013
- Stadium: AT&T Stadium; Arlington, Texas, U.S.
- Favorite: Cowboys by 4
- Referee: Walt Coleman
- Attendance: 91,054

TV in the United States
- Network: Fox
- Announcers: Joe Buck, Troy Aikman, and Pam Oliver

The Green Bay Packers played an American football game against the Dallas Cowboys in Week 15 of the 2013 National Football League (NFL) season on December 15, 2013, at AT&T Stadium in Arlington, Texas, United States. Both teams entered Week 15 with middling records, with the Packers sitting at 6–6–1 and the Cowboys at 7–6. The Packers started the season strong, yet a broken collarbone by quarterback Aaron Rodgers in Week 8 saw the Packers lose or tie five straight games under three different back-up quarterbacks. Both teams were coming off a loss in Week 14, although each of their playoff hopes were still alive and both still had a chance to win their respective divisions.

The Cowboys started the game strong, taking a 26–3 lead going into halftime, with kicker Dan Bailey converting four field goals. Matt Flynn, who was playing in place of the injured Rodgers, helped the Packers storm back in the second half. He led the Packers to five touchdown drives, including four touchdown passes. The Packers defense was able to hold the Cowboys to just 10 points in the second half, with Tramon Williams sealing the victory with an interception of quarterback Tony Romo with less than two minutes left in the game. The victory matched the Packers team record for the largest comeback at 23 points and helped them maintain the possibility of winning the NFC North and making the playoffs. Both teams entered the final week of the season with a chance to win their division; the Packers won, while the Cowboys lost. The Packers would make the playoffs yet lose in the first round to the San Francisco 49ers.

== Background ==
The Green Bay Packers began the season as the defending NFC North champions, having won the division the previous two seasons. They began their season with a record of 5–2, although one of their losses came after surrendering a 16-point second half lead to the Cincinnati Bengals. Their eighth game of the year was on Monday Night Football against the Chicago Bears. In the first quarter, Aaron Rodgers was injured, missing the rest of the game with what was later diagnosed as a broken collarbone. Rodgers would go on to miss the next seven games, with Seneca Wallace, Scott Tolzien, and Matt Flynn all starting games in his place. Wallace was injured in his first game and the Packers signed Flynn, who had played for the Packers previously, midway through the season. The Packers went 0–4–1 during a five-game stretch which included the Bears game to bring their record to 5–6–1. The Packers played the Atlanta Falcons in Week 14 and fell behind 21–10 in the first half. However, Flynn led a comeback to beat the Falcons 22–21, evening the Packers record at 6–6–1 and keeping them in the hunt for the NFC North.

The Dallas Cowboys began the 2013 season having gone 8–8 in back-to-back seasons, missing the playoffs both times. The season was back-and-forth, with the Cowboys never winning more than two games in a row nor losing more than two games in a row. They entered Week 15 with a record of 7–6 after a loss to the Bears in Week 14. The Cowboys were scheduled to host the Packers in Week 15 at AT&T Stadium on December 15, 2013. Both teams were mathematically still in the hunt for their respective division titles and needed a victory to improve their chances of making the playoffs. The Cowboys were favored by four points.

== Game summary ==
AT&T Stadium, shown here in 2012, was the site of the Week 15 match-up between the Packers and Cowboys.

=== First half ===
The Cowboys started the game with possession of the ball. A 27-yard pass from Tony Romo to Terrance Williams got the Cowboys in scoring position, but the Packers got a stop on third down and forced a 47-yard field goal attempt, which Dan Bailey converted. The Packers matched the Cowboys on the next drive, going 41 yards in 6 plays to set-up a 57-yard field goal attempt. Almost all of the yardage on the drive came from a 39-yard pass from Matt Flynn to James Jones. Mason Crosby converted the field goal, tying the game at 3–3. On the subsequent drive, DeMarco Murray had a 41-yard rush that put the Cowboys in scoring position, but again the Packers stopped the Cowboys on third down, with Bailey converting a 23-yard field goal to give the Cowboys the lead again, 6–3. After the Packers went three-and-out and punted, the Cowboys quickly drove 65 yards in 4 plays, capped off by a 25-yard touchdown from Romo to Jason Witten. The Cowboys lead increased to 13–3. On the first play of the next drive, Flynn threw deep to Jones and the Cowboys were called for a 31-yard defensive pass interference penalty. However, after a sack and two incomplete passes, the Packers were forced to punt again. Each team then exchanged punts after short drives. The Cowboys got the ball back and drove 48 yards in 8 plays, but again were stopped and had to attempt a field goal. Bailey converted his third field goal of the half, this time from 43 yards, to increase the Cowboys lead to 16–3. On the next drive, Flynn threw an interception to Sterling Moore, who returned it 21 yards. The Packers did not allow the Cowboys to gain any yardage on their drive, but they were already in field goal range. Bailey made his fourth field goal of the half, this time from 50 yards, bringing the score to 19–3. The Packers were again forced to punt on their next drive. Romo completed three passes on the next drive for a combined 70 yards, with Murray scoring a touchdown on a one-yard rush. The Packers attempted to score on the next drive, but they ran out of a time after a 34-yard screen pass from Flynn to Eddie Lacy ended the first half. The Cowboys led 26–3 at halftime.

=== Second half ===
The Packers had possession of the ball to begin the second half. On the first play of their drive, Lacy had a 60-yard rush; three plays later Flynn threw a touchdown pass to Jordy Nelson, cutting the Cowboys lead to 26–10. The Cowboys responded, with Bailey kicking his fifth field goal, from 50 yards, of the game after an 11-play, 48-yard drive. On the ensuing drive, the Packers again travelled the length of the field, going 80 yards in 12 plays, and scoring on a 3-yard touchdown pass from Flynn to Andrew Quarless. After the Cowboys' field goal and Packers' touchdown, the score was 29–17. The Packers forced a three-and-out on the Cowboys' next drive after sacking Romo on third down. Micah Hyde returned the Cowboys' punt from mid-field 26 yards. The Packers scored five plays later on an 11-yard touchdown pass from Flynn to James Starks. The Cowboys lead was now only five points, 29–24. On the Cowboys next drive, Romo threw a pass that appeared to be intercepted by Tramon Williams, however after replay review, the pass was called incomplete. The Cowboys capitalized, going the length of the field to score a touchdown on a short pass from Romo to Dez Bryant. The Packers responded, going 80 yards in 10 plays to score, with Flynn completing a 3-yard pass to Jones for a touchdown. The Cowboys lead was cut back to five points again, with the score at 36–31. The Cowboys converted a third down with 12 yards to go on the next drive, but on the fifth play Romo threw an interception to Sam Shields at mid-field. The Packers drove to the Cowboys' one-yard line with less than two minutes left in the game. Lacy scored a touchdown on a one-yard rush, with the Packers failing on the two-point conversion. Down for the first time in the game, 37–36, the Cowboys began their next drive with a nine-yard completion from Romo to Cole Beasley. Romo's next pass was ruled incomplete, yet after replay review, the call was changed to an interception by Williams. The Packers ran out the rest of the game clock to secure the comeback victory.

=== Box score ===
Week Fifteen: Green Bay Packers at Dallas Cowboys – Game summary

Quarter	1	2	3	4	Total
Packers	3	0	14	20	37
Cowboys	13	13	3	7	36

at AT&T Stadium, Arlington, Texas

- Date: December 15
- Game time: 3:25 pm. CST
- Game weather: Played indoors (retractable roof closed)
- Game attendance: 91,054
- Referee: Walt Coleman
- TV announcers (Fox): Joe Buck, Troy Aikman, and Pam Oliver
- Sources: Pro-Football-References.com and ESPN.com

Game information

First quarter

- DAL – Dan Bailey 47-yard field goal, 10:56. Cowboys 3–0. Drive: 8 plays, 52 yards, 4:04.
- GB – Mason Crosby 57-yard field goal, 7:40. Tied 3–3. Drive: 6 plays, 41 yards, 3:16.
- DAL – Dan Bailey 23-yard field goal, 4:52. Cowboys 6–3. Drive: 7 plays, 75 yards, 2:48.
- DAL – Jason Witten 25-yard pass from Tony Romo (Dan Bailey kick), 0:28. Cowboys 13–3. Drive: 4 plays, 65 yards, 1:57.

Second quarter

- DAL – Dan Bailey 43-yard field goal, 5:54. Cowboys 16–3. Drive: 8 plays, 48 yards, 3:26.
- DAL – Dan Bailey 50-yard field goal, 3:45. Cowboys 19–3. Drive: 4 plays, -11 yards, 0:53.
- DAL – DeMarco Murray 1-yard run (Dan Bailey kick), 0:24. Cowboys 26–3. Drive: 6 plays, 75 yards, 1:35.

Third quarter

- GB – Jordy Nelson 13-yard pass from Matt Flynn (Mason Crosby kick), 13:08. Cowboys 26–10. Drive: 4 plays, 80 yards, 1:52.
- DAL – Dan Bailey 50-yard field goal, 6:33. Cowboys 29–10. Drive: 11 plays, 48 yards, 6:35.
- GB – Andrew Quarless 3-yard pass from Matt Flynn (Mason Crosby kick), 1:09. Cowboys 29–17. Drive: 12 plays, 80 yards, 5:24.

Fourth quarter

- GB – James Starks 11-yard pass from Matt Flynn (Mason Crosby kick), 12:47. Cowboys 29–24. Drive: 5 plays, 22 yards, 2:14.
- DAL – Dez Bryant 5-yard pass from Tony Romo (Dan Bailey kick), 7:55. Cowboys 36–24. Drive: 10 plays, 80 yards, 4:52.
- GB – James Jones 3-yard pass from Matt Flynn (Mason Crosby kick), 4:17. Cowboys 36–31. Drive: 10 plays, 80 yards, 3:38.
- GB – Eddie Lacy 3-yard run (pass failed), 1:31. Packers 37–36. Drive: 7 plays, 50 yards, 1:15.

Green Bay Packers stats

Passing

- Matt Flynn – 26/39, 299 yards, 4 touchdowns, 1 interception

Rushing

- Eddie Lacy – 21 rushes, 141 yards, 1 touchdown
- James Starks – 3 rushes, 12 yards
- Matt Flynn – 3 rushes, -3 yards

Receiving

- Jarrett Boykin – 6 receptions, 83 yards
- Andrew Quarless – 6 receptions, 66 yards, 1 touchdown
- Jordy Nelson – 5 receptions, 61 yards, 1 touchdown
- Eddie Lacy – 4 receptions, 30 yards
- James Jones – 3 receptions, 49 yards, 1 touchdown
- James Starks – 1 reception, 11 yards, 1 touchdown
- John Kuhn – 1 reception, -1 yards
Dallas Cowboys stats

Passing

- Tony Romo – 29/48, 358 yards, 2 touchdowns, 2 interceptions

Rushing

- DeMarco Murray – 18 rushes, 134 yards, 1 touchdown

Receiving

- Dez Bryant – 11 receptions, 153 yards, 1 touchdown
- Jason Witten – 4 receptions, 71 yards, 1 touchdown
- Terrance Williams – 4 receptions, 46 yards
- DeMarco Murray – 4 receptions, 19 yards
- Cole Beasley – 3 receptions, 19 yards
- Miles Austin – 2 reception, 35 yards
- Gavin Escobar – 1 reception, 15 yards

=== Analysis ===
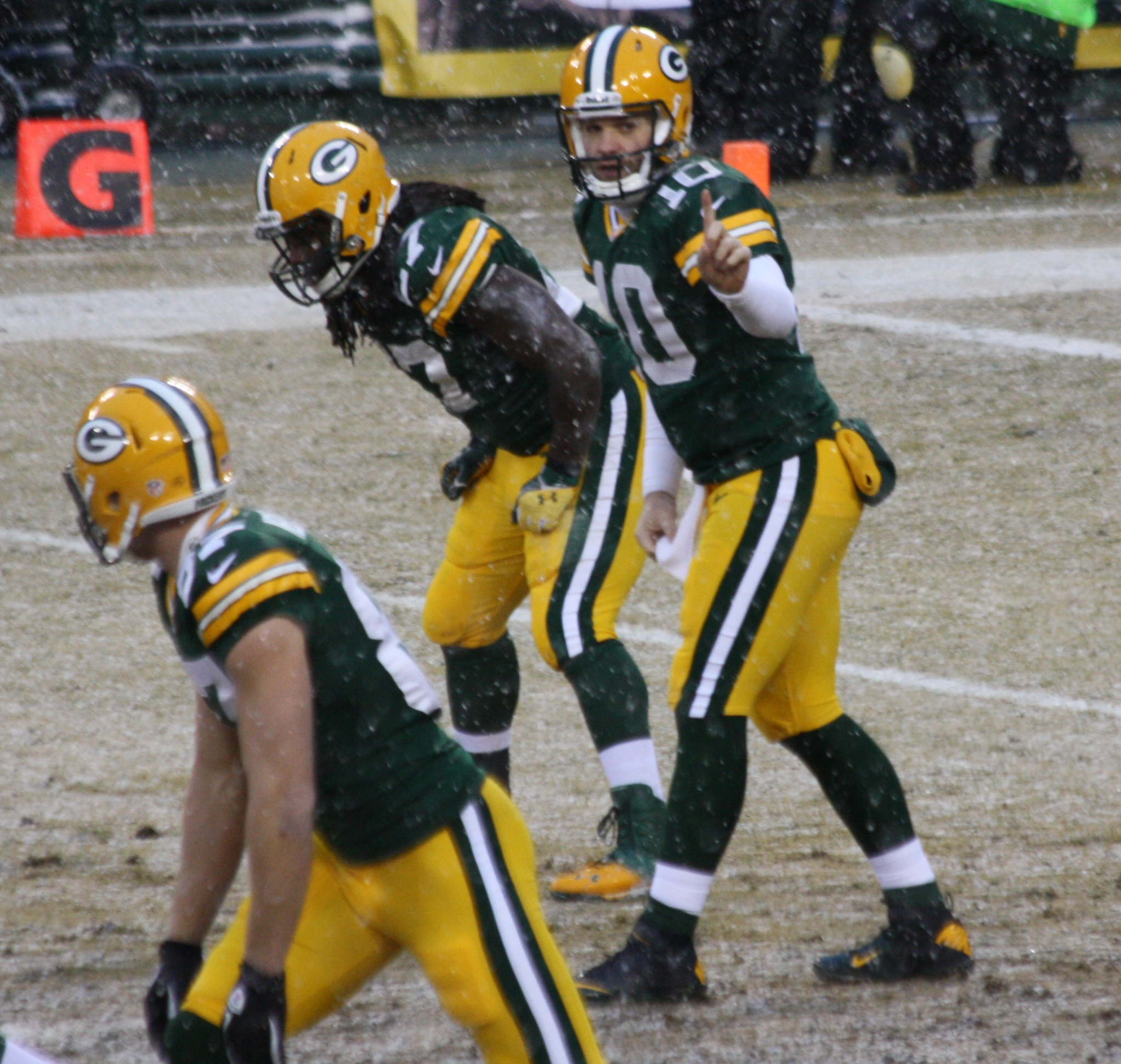
Matt Flynn, shown here during another 2013 game, helped lead the Packers' comeback with four touchdown passes in the second half.

Post-game analysis focused on the Packers’ comeback and the significant differences for each team between the first and second half. The Packers' offense was only able to score three points in the first half, even though the Cowboys came into the game with the worst ranked defense in the NFL. The Packers' defense was able to stop the Cowboys offense on four drives, forcing field goals instead of touchdowns. Even so, the Cowboys offense was able to move the ball through the air and on the ground and took a commanding 26–3 lead into halftime. Coming into the second half, the Packers decided to run the ball, with Lacy breaking free for a 60-yard rush that multiple players noted sparked the Packers’ offense. The Packers scored their first touchdown three plays later, starting a streak of five straight touchdown drives. Other key plays were highlighted, including interceptions in the fourth quarter by Shields and Williams that helped the Packers gain the lead for the first time and seal their victory.

Individual performances were highlighted, especially on offense. Romo threw for 358 yards and two touchdowns, while Flynn had 299 passing yards and four touchdowns. Each team had a rusher eclipse 100 yards, with Lacy gaining 141 yards and Murray having 134 yards; each scored a touchdown. Boykin and Quarless led the Packers in receptions and yards, although Nelson’s performance on third down was specifically noted. On the Cowboys’ side, Bryant had a successful performance, catching 11 passes for 153 yards and a touchdown. His touchdown catch was praised for its level of difficulty.

After the game, decisions by the Cowboys coaching staff and Romo were questioned. The Cowboys were very successful rushing the ball in the first half, with Murray going for 93 yards. However, in the second half, even with a large lead, the Cowboys only gave the ball to Murray seven times. Ironically, it was the Packers who saw a lot of success in the second half rushing the ball. This was very apparent on each Cowboys’ drive that ended in an interception, with post-game commentators questioning why the Cowboys were not trying to run out the clock and instead were throwing the ball downfield. Cowboys head coach Jason Garrett noted after the game that in hindsight the team should have called more running plays.

== Outcome ==
After their victory, the Packers record was 7–6–1 and they were still in the hunt for the NFC North title. With Rodgers close to returning, the Packers hosted the Pittsburgh Steelers at Lambeau Field in Week 16. In that game the Packers gave up a late score after a fumble by Flynn, but then had a long kickoff return by Micah Hyde. After a couple plays, the Packers got to the one-yard line, but a penalty pushed them back five yards and gave them just enough time to run a play to try to score. Flynn threw incomplete and the Packers lost, leaving them with 7–7–1 record. The Bears lost in Week 16 as well, setting up a match-up in Week 17 for the NFC North title between the Packers and Bears, who were hosting. Rodgers returned from his injury for the Bears game and threw a late touchdown pass on fourth down to seal the victory and the NFC North title for the Packers. The game against the Bears was named one of the 50 greatest sports moments in Wisconsin history in 2020 by the Milwaukee Journal Sentinel. The Packers hosted the San Francisco 49ers in the first round of the playoffs, losing 23–20 and ending their season.

The Cowboys recovered the next week, beating the Washington Redskins and setting up another winner-take-all game for the NFC East division title against the Philadelphia Eagles in Week 17. The Cowboys lost 24–22, with a late interception keeping them from getting into field goal range near the end of the game. The loss gave the Eagles the division title and caused the Cowboys to miss the playoffs for the fourth straight season.

=== Legacy ===
The 23-point comeback victory tied the Packers' record for the largest comeback in franchise history. The previous 23-point comeback came during a 1982 regular season game against the Los Angeles Rams. The Milwaukee Journal Sentinel highlighted the game as one of the Packers' biggest fourth quarter comebacks, with the team down 12 points heading into the last quarter. It was also the second notable game where Flynn had a big outing as a back-up to Rodgers, after the final game of the 2011 season. In a 2024 article comparing the similarities between the 2013 and 2024 Packers seasons, the Wisconsin State Journal noted that Flynn helped engineer "a miraculous come-from-behind win" while providing enough contributions "to keep the Packers alive for a playoff berth". In his book chronicling the first 100 years of Packers history, Cliff Christl described the comeback against the Cowboys as an essential part of the 2013 season for the Packers, highlighting Flynn's contributions to the game. The victory helped the Packers keep their playoffs hopes alive, ultimately becoming necessary for them to win the NFC North. The game is a notable part of the Cowboys–Packers rivalry; Sports Illustrated in 2022 named it the fifth best game in the history of the rivalry.
