= Vic Shealy =

American football player and coach (born 1961)

Biographical details
- Born: July 14, 1961 (age 65); Nashville, Tennessee, U.S.
- Education: University of Richmond (1984)

Playing career
- 1979: Liberty

Coaching career (HC unless noted)
- 1981–1983: Richmond (SA)
- 1984–1985: Baylor (GA)
- 1986–1987: Mars Hill (DB)
- 1988–1989: Austin Peay (OC)
- 1992: Mars Hill (OC)
- 1993–1994: Austin Peay (DC/DB)
- 1995–1998: Azusa Pacific
- 1999–2004: Air Force (DB)
- 2005–2008: UNLV (DC)
- 2009: Richmond (DC)
- 2010: Kansas (CB)
- 2011: Kansas (DC/CB)
- 2012–2022: Houston Baptist / Houston Christian

Head coaching record
- Overall: 48–86–1
- Tournaments: 4–0 (NAIA playoffs)

Accomplishments and honors

Championships
- 1 NAIA (1998)

Awards
- NAIA Coach of the Year (1998)

Victor Dalmuth Shealy (born July 14, 1961) is an American football coach and former player. He was most recently the head coach at Houston Christian University. He was previously the defensive coordinator and cornerbacks coach at the University of Kansas. From 1995 to 1998, Shealy served as the head football coach at Azusa Pacific University, compiling a record of 27–14–1. In 1998, he coached the team to the NAIA Football National Championship. For his efforts that season, Shealy was named the NAIA Coach of the Year and the American Football Quarterly Schutt National Coach of the Year.

== Early career ==
Shealy was born in Nashville, Tennessee in 1961, the son of football coach Dal Shealy. He attended Auburn High School in Auburn, Alabama, playing quarterback for the Auburn High Tigers before playing for Liberty Baptist College, now Liberty University, in 1979. After a year at Liberty, Shealy transferred to the University of Richmond, from where he graduated in 1984. Shealy immediately entered the coaching profession as a graduate assistant at Baylor University—receiving a master's degree from that institution in 1986—before being appointed secondary coach at Mars Hill College in 1986. Shealy became offensive coordinator at Austin Peay State University from 1988 to 1990, when he briefly left the coaching ranks. He returned to Mars Hill as offensive coordinator in 1992, and in 1993 left again for Austin Peay where he was secondary coach and, in 1994, defensive coordinator.

== Azusa Pacific ==
In 1995, Shealy was named head coach of the Azusa Pacific Cougars football team. In his first year, he led the team to a 4–4–1 record, followed by a 7–3 season in 1996, the first winning season for Azusa Pacific since 1990. Shealy's Cougars fell to 4–5 in 1997, but in 1998 Azusa Pacific went 12–2, winning the NAIA national championship over Olivet Nazarene, 17–14. He was named the NAIA Coach of the Year and received the Shutt Coach of the Year Award from the American Football Quarterly. Shealy left Azusa Pacific after that season to take a defensive coaching position at the United States Air Force Academy. His overall record at Azusa Pacific was 27–14–1.

== Division I FBS coaching positions ==
At the Air Force Academy, Shealy coached the defensive secondary from 1999 through 2004. In 2005, Shealy left to become defensive coordinator at the University of Nevada, Las Vegas, where he also served as assistant head coach and safeties coach. In 2009, he began serving as the University of Richmond defensive coordinator. In 2010, he took the role of cornerbacks coach with the University of Kansas.

== Houston Baptist ==
Shealy was named Houston Baptist University's first head football coach on April 9, 2012. In HBU's first official season in 2014, the Huskies registered their first Southland Conference win on Homecoming, defeating Nicholls, 31–21, on October 25. Five student-athletes earned all-conference honors, including two second-team selections, one academic all-conference honoree and one tabbed Freshman All-America. In Shealy’s second year, two more Huskies earned all-conference honors and one was named to the academic all-conference team. Linebacker Garrett Dolan ranked among the top 10 nationally in tackles per game and punter Christian Guzman ranked among the top 10 nationally in yards per punt. On November 21, 2022, Shealy resigned his position as HCU Head Coach. He finished his coaching tenure at HCU with a record of 21-79 in ten seasons.

== Head coaching record ==
Year	Team	Overall	Conference	Standing	Bowl/playoffs	NAIA^{#}
Azusa Pacific Cougars (NAIA Division II / NAIA independent) (1995–1998)
1995	Azusa Pacific	4–4–1				
1996	Azusa Pacific	7–3				21
1997	Azusa Pacific	4–5				
1998	Azusa Pacific	12–2			W NAIA Championship	8
Azusa Pacific:		27–14–1				
Houston Baptist Huskies (NCAA Division I FCS independent) (2013)
2013	Houston Baptist	3–4				
Houston Baptist / Houston Christian Huskies (Southland Conference) (2014–2022)
2014	Houston Baptist	2–9	1–7	10th		
2015	Houston Baptist	2–9	0–8	11th		
2016	Houston Baptist	4–7	3–5	7th		
2017	Houston Baptist	1–10	0–9	11th		
2018	Houston Baptist	1–10	0–9	11th		
2019	Houston Baptist	5–7	2–6	10th		
2020	Houston Baptist	1–3	0–0	N/A		
2021	Houston Baptist	0–11	0–8	6th		
2022	Houston Christian	2–9	1–5	T–7th		
Houston Baptist / Houston Christian:		21–79	7–57			
Total:		48–93–1				
National championship Conference title Conference division title or championship game berth
^{#}Rankings from final NAIA Division II poll in 1996, final NAIA poll in 1998.
