= Wally Kersten =

American football player (born 1959)

No. 68
- Position: Offensive tackle

Personal information
- Born: December 8, 1959 (age 66); Minneapolis, Minnesota, U.S.
- Listed height: 6 ft 5 in (1.96 m)
- Listed weight: 270 lb (122 kg)

Career information
- High school: Roosevelt
- College: Minnesota
- NFL draft: 1982: 5th round, 117th overall pick

Career history
- Los Angeles Rams (1982); Minnesota Vikings (1985)*; San Francisco 49ers (1985)*; Tampa Bay Buccaneers (1985)*; Indianapolis Colts (1986)*
- * Offseason or practice squad member only

Career NFL statistics
- Games played: 3
- Stats at Pro Football Reference

Wallace Todd Kersten (born December 8, 1959) is an American former professional football player who was a tackle or the Los Angeles Rams of the National Football League (NFL) in 1982. He played college football for the Minnesota Golden Gophers.
