= Matt Flynn (American football) =

American football player (born 1985)

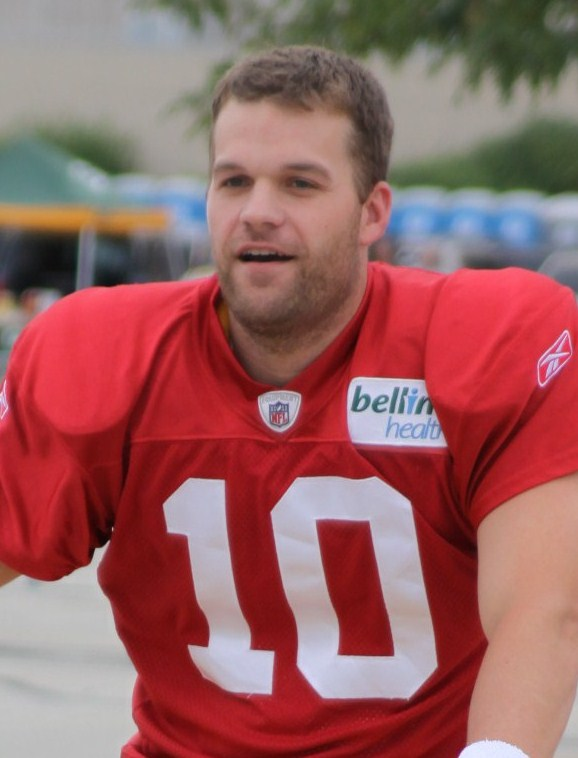
- Flynn with the Green Bay Packers in 2011

No. 10, 15
- Position: Quarterback

Personal information
- Born: June 20, 1985 (age 41); Tyler, Texas, U.S.
- Listed height: 6 ft 2 in (1.88 m)
- Listed weight: 230 lb (104 kg)

Career information
- High school: Robert E. Lee (Tyler)
- College: LSU (2003–2007)
- NFL draft: 2008: 7th round, 209th overall pick

Career history
- Green Bay Packers (2008–2011); Seattle Seahawks (2012); Oakland Raiders (2013); Buffalo Bills (2013); Green Bay Packers (2013–2014); New England Patriots (2015)*; New York Jets (2015)*; New Orleans Saints (2015)
- * Offseason or practice squad member only

Awards and highlights
- Super Bowl champion (XLV); 2× BCS national champion (2003, 2007)

Career NFL statistics
- Passing attempts: 357
- Passing completions: 219
- Completion percentage: 61.3%
- TD–INT: 17–11
- Passing yards: 2,541
- Passer rating: 85.9
- Stats at Pro Football Reference

Matthew Clayton Flynn (born June 20, 1985) is an American former professional football player who was a quarterback in the National Football League (NFL). He played college football for the LSU Tigers and was selected by the Green Bay Packers in the seventh round of the 2008 NFL draft. Flynn was a member of the Packers when they won Super Bowl XLV over the Pittsburgh Steelers. He also played for the Seattle Seahawks, Oakland Raiders, Buffalo Bills, New England Patriots, New York Jets, and New Orleans Saints.

== Early life and family ==
Matthew Flynn, born and raised in Tyler, Texas, is the son of Alvin and Ruth Flynn. Matthew Flynn's father, a civil attorney, was a quarterback at Baylor in the 1960s, and his mother is a former collegiate dance team director and choreographer at Kilgore College and Tyler Junior College. Matt has two brothers, Adam and Bill, and two sisters, Rebecca and Amanda.

== High school career ==
Flynn attended Robert E. Lee High School where he was coached by Mike Owens, and was teammates with Justin Warren, Brandon Pettigrew, and Ciron Black. As a junior in 2001, Flynn completed 101 of 199 passes for 1,650 yards, 13 touchdowns and 9 interceptions for the season, leading Lee to the 5A-I playoffs, where they lost in the second round to eventual state champion Mesquite High School. As a senior, he completed 124 of 206 passes for 1,679 yards and 9 touchdowns, and had 305 yards rushing with 12 touchdowns. He led Lee to a state semifinal game appearance despite playing the last four games of the season with a broken foot.

After his senior season, 247 Sports listed Flynn as the top-rated Texas high school quarterback in 2003. He was a member of the SuperPrep Texas 124, the Dallas Morning News Texas Top 100 and the Tyler Morning Telegraph All-East Texas Football Team. He chose LSU over Tennessee, Texas Tech, and Texas A&M.

== College career ==
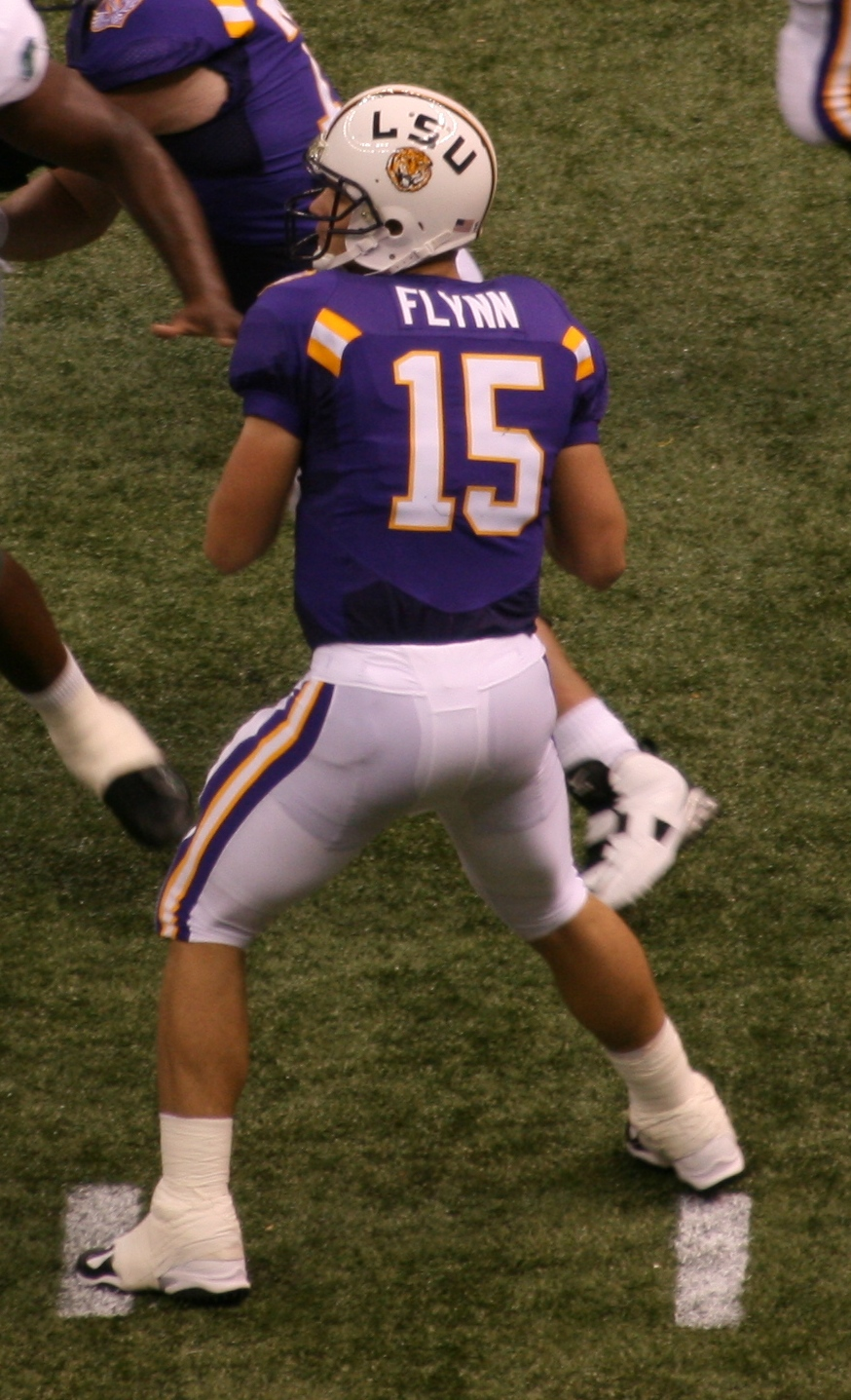
Flynn as quarterback for the LSU Tigers

=== 2003–2006 ===
Flynn redshirted the 2003 season at LSU. In 2004, he served as third-string quarterback behind starter Marcus Randall and backup JaMarcus Russell. He also doubled as LSU's holder on placekicks. Flynn played in all 12 games, but only three games as quarterback. His collegiate first completion went to Xavier Carter for a 67-yard touchdown against Mississippi State. Flynn also made a short appearance in the 2004 Capital One Bowl, completing 1 of 4 passes for 11 yards in a 25–30 losing effort against Iowa. He finished the season with 4 completions on 10 attempts for 99 yards and 1 touchdown.

The departure of Randall left Russell and Flynn battling for the starting quarterback position in the 2005 season. Russell eventually got the job, leaving Flynn as backup. He played in seven games at quarterback for the Tigers in 2005, completing 27 of 48 passes for 457 yards, 7 touchdowns and 1 interception. In a win over North Texas, Flynn threw a perfect 7-of-7 for 139 yards and 3 touchdowns, all in the fourth quarter. In the 2005 SEC Championship Game against the Georgia Bulldogs, starting quarterback Russell was injured and Flynn finished the game. He was then given the nod to start for the Tigers in the 2005 Chick-fil-A Peach Bowl against the University of Miami Hurricanes. In that game, he led the Tigers to a 40–3 rout of Miami.

In 2006, Flynn again served as backup to Russell, appearing in seven games. He completed 12 of 20 passes for 133 yards over the season, recording 2 touchdowns and 1 interception. Both touchdowns came in a 49–0 rout against Kentucky on October 14, 2006.

=== 2007: BCS National Championship season ===
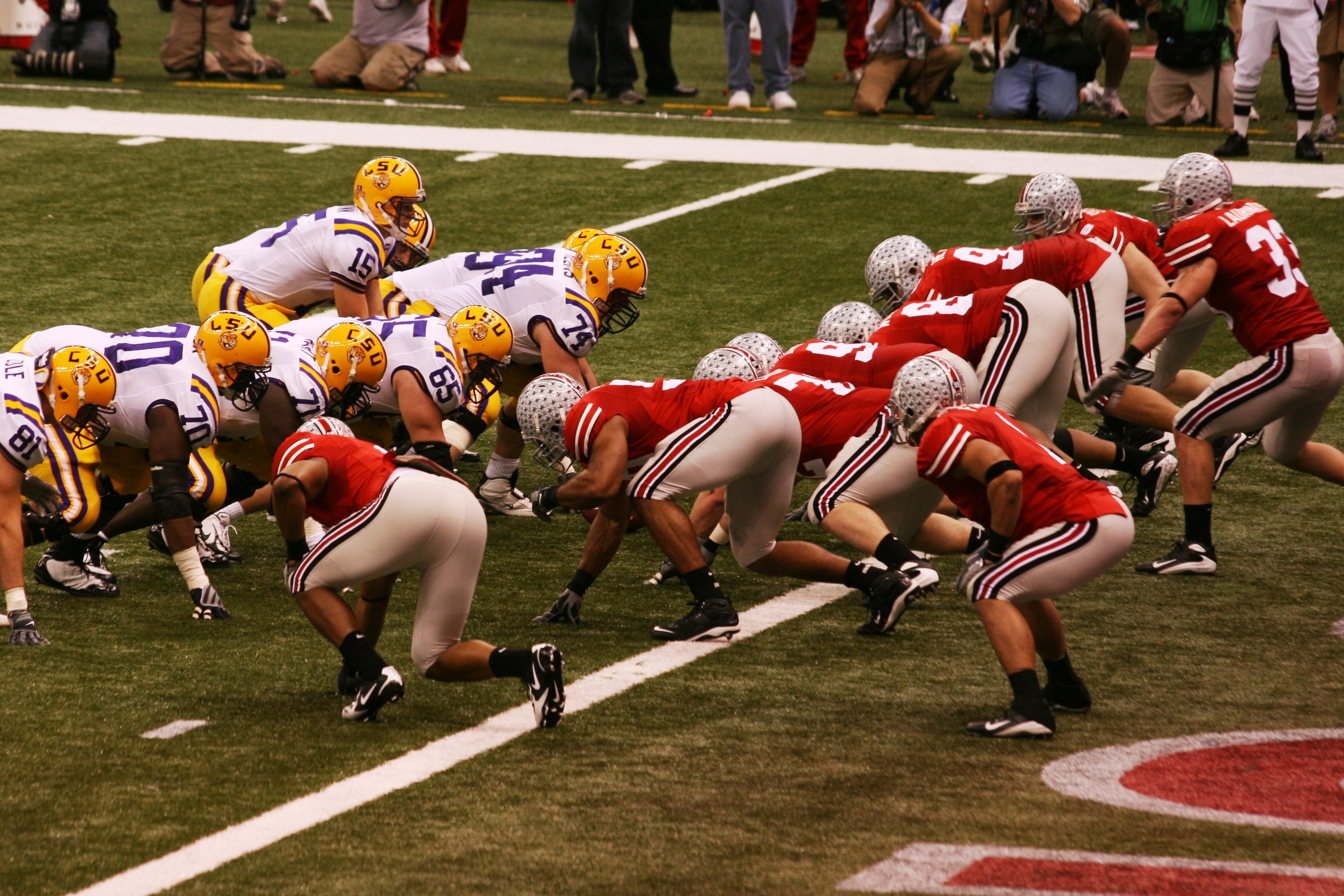
Flynn (No. 15) quarterbacks the LSU Tigers during the 2008 BCS National Championship Game against the Ohio State Buckeyes.

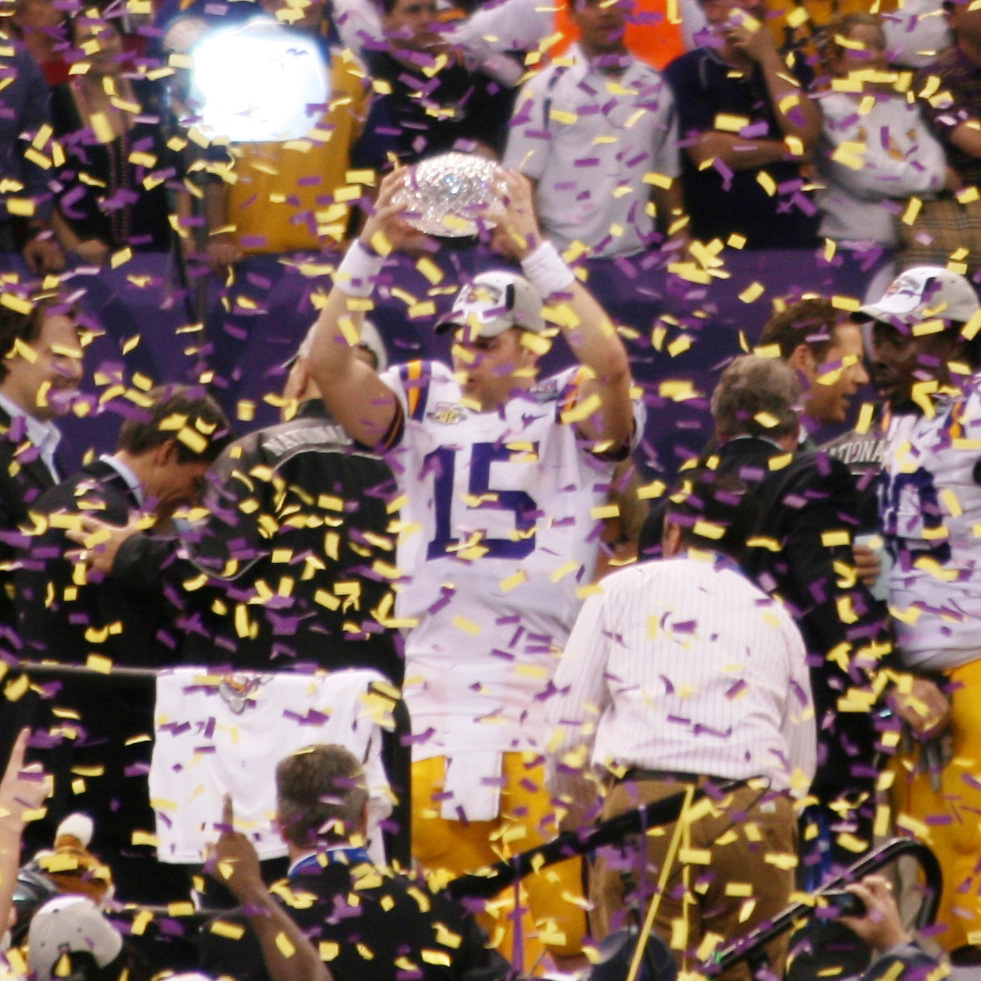
Flynn holds up the AFCA National Championship Trophy.

With JaMarcus Russell's departure, Flynn became a starter as a fifth-year senior. He started every game that season except the SEC Championship in which he was injured. He finished the season with 2,407 passing yards, 21 touchdowns and 11 interceptions. In addition, he rushed for 215 yards and 4 touchdowns.

Flynn threw a 22-yard touchdown pass to Demetrius Byrd to win the game against Auburn on October 20, 2007, with 1 second remaining on the clock; Colt David kicked the extra point to make the final score LSU 30, Auburn 24.

He then led the Tigers to a 4th quarter comeback against Alabama. Flynn and the Tigers then beat Louisiana Tech the following weekend and climb back to the #1 spot after a loss by then-#1 Ohio State. The following week the Tigers beat Ole Miss. In his final game at Tiger Stadium, Flynn and the Tigers lost to Arkansas, seemingly losing any chance at the national title. However, LSU, without Flynn, beat Tennessee for the SEC Championship, and losses by Missouri and West Virginia vaulted LSU back into the title game in New Orleans.

On January 7, 2008, Flynn led LSU to a BCS National Championship, beating Ohio State 38–24. Flynn completed 19 of 27 passes and 4 touchdowns, and was named offensive MVP of the game. The Tigers finished the season ranked No. 1 in the polls.

== Professional career ==
Pre-draft measurables
Height	Weight	Arm length	Hand span	40-yard dash	10-yard split	20-yard split	20-yard shuttle	Three-cone drill	Vertical jump	Broad jump
6 ft 2 1/4 in (1.89 m)	228 lb (103 kg)	31 1/2 in (0.80 m)	9 in (0.23 m)	4.79 s	1.62 s	2.72 s	4.34 s	7.21 s	28 in (0.71 m)	9 ft 1 in (2.77 m)
All values are from the NFL Scouting Combine.

=== Green Bay Packers (first stint) ===
Flynn was selected by the Green Bay Packers in the seventh round (209th overall) of the 2008 NFL draft. On July 23, he was signed to a four-year rookie contract through the 2011 season. In 2008, Flynn won the competition for the back-up role to Aaron Rodgers, beating out fellow rookie and second-round pick Brian Brohm. Flynn was seen as being less talented than Brohm because of Brohm's superior size, arm and foot speed, coupled with the fact that Brohm was selected much higher in the draft compared to Flynn.

On December 19, 2010, Flynn made his first NFL start, against the New England Patriots, after starting quarterback Aaron Rodgers was not cleared medically to start. Flynn threw three touchdown passes; one each to John Kuhn, James Jones and Greg Jennings against New England, but threw an interception that was returned by Kyle Arrington for a touchdown in the second half. The game went down to the final play when Flynn, with the ball at the New England 15-yard line, lost it when he was sacked. The Packers lost the game 31–27. Flynn completed 23 of 37 passes for 254 yards in the loss.

Flynn was the backup to Rodgers when the Packers won Super Bowl XLV on February 6, 2011.

On January 1, 2012, Flynn started the final game of the season, against the Detroit Lions. He threw for 480 yards and six touchdowns in the 45–41 victory, both of which set single game Packers records.

=== Seattle Seahawks ===
On March 18, 2012, Flynn signed a three-year deal with the Seattle Seahawks worth $20.5 million, with $9 million guaranteed. He decided to wear the number 15, his number from college. Flynn competed with 2011 starting quarterback Tarvaris Jackson and 2012 NFL draft third round pick Russell Wilson for the starting quarterback position. When Wilson was named the starter, it made Flynn and his contract expendable.

=== Oakland Raiders ===
On April 2, 2013, the Seahawks traded Flynn to the Oakland Raiders for a 2014 fifth round pick and a conditional 2015 draft pick. He was brought in to compete with 2013 NFL draft fourth round pick Tyler Wilson and 2011 NFL draft supplemental third round pick Terrelle Pryor for the starting quarterback position, with Pryor winning the starting job in preseason.

He was assigned number 15. Flynn relieved an injured Pryor in a Week 3 match-up against the Broncos, completing 1 of 2 passes for 19 yards in a 37–21 loss. With Pryor's concussion preventing him from starting the next week against the Redskins, Flynn started and completed 21 out of 32 passes for 227 yards with one touchdown pass and one interception (which was returned for a Redskins touchdown) in a 24–14 loss. Several days later, Raiders coach Dennis Allen announced Flynn's demotion to third-string behind Pryor and undrafted rookie Matt McGloin.

On October 7, 2013, the Raiders released Flynn just six months after bringing him in to be the starter.

=== Buffalo Bills ===
On October 14, 2013, Flynn signed with the Buffalo Bills after both rookie starting quarterback EJ Manuel and backup Thad Lewis were injured. He was assigned number 17. Flynn did not see any playing time in Buffalo and primarily served as an emergency replacement should third-string quarterback Jeff Tuel also be hurt. Flynn was released on November 4, 2013 after Lewis and Manuel recovered from their injuries.

=== Green Bay Packers (second stint) ===
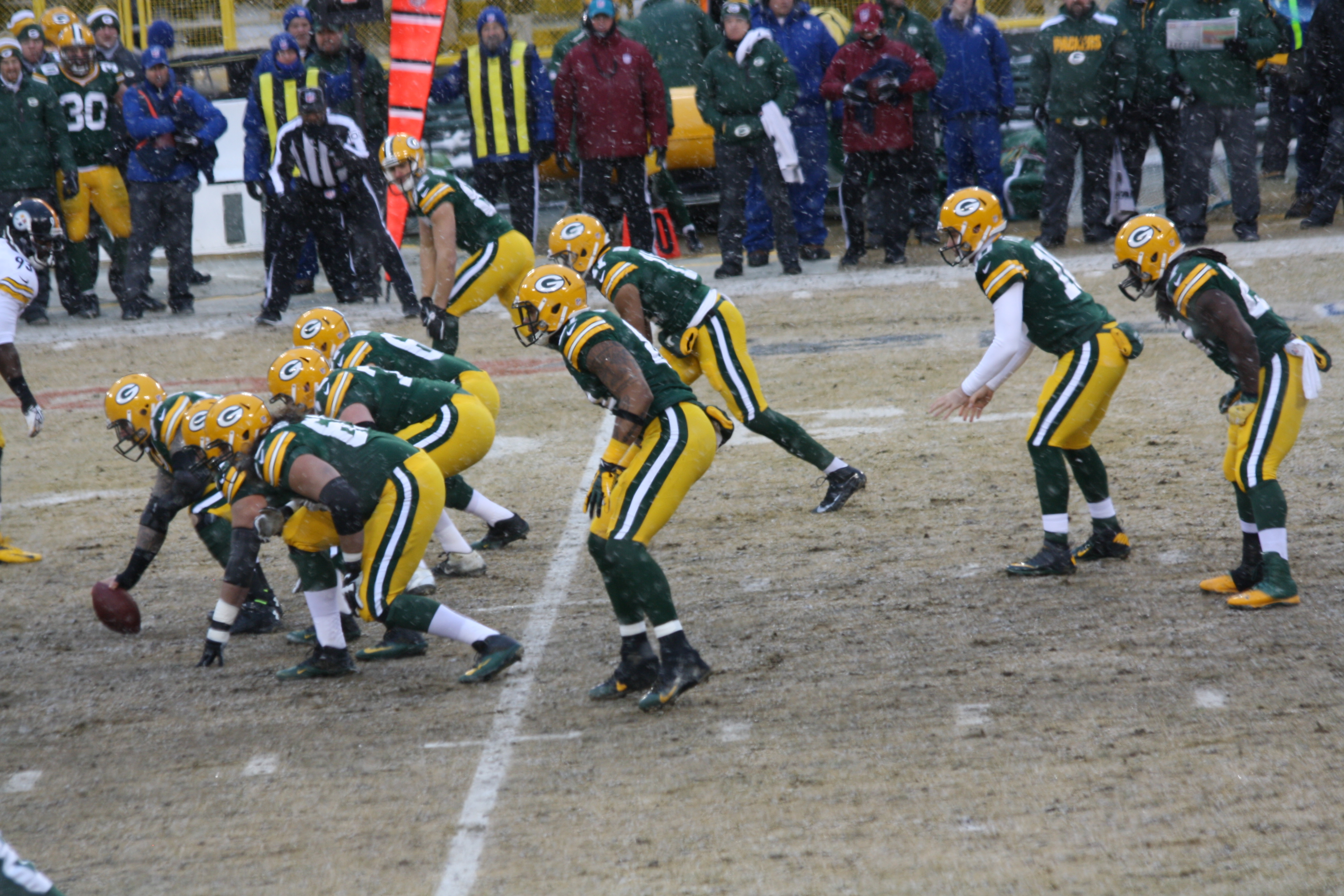
Flynn (second from right) leading the Packers on December 22, 2013

On November 12, 2013, due to injuries to starting quarterback Aaron Rodgers and backup quarterback Seneca Wallace, Flynn was re-signed by Green Bay to be the backup for Scott Tolzien.

On November 24, 2013, against the Minnesota Vikings, Flynn was brought in to relieve the struggling Tolzien midway through the 3rd quarter. Flynn rallied the team from a 23–7 deficit at the beginning of the 4th quarter. The game went to overtime with a 23–23 score. The Packers struck first in overtime with a field goal, but due to the NFL's new regular season overtime rules, the Vikings got the ball back and also scored a field goal. The game ended in a 26–26 tie.

On November 27, 2013, it was announced that Flynn would be the starting quarterback for the Thanksgiving game against the Detroit Lions. Flynn struggled, only completing 10 of 20 attempts for 139 yards with one interception and two fumbles. He was sacked 7 times, including one for a safety. The Packers lost 40–10.

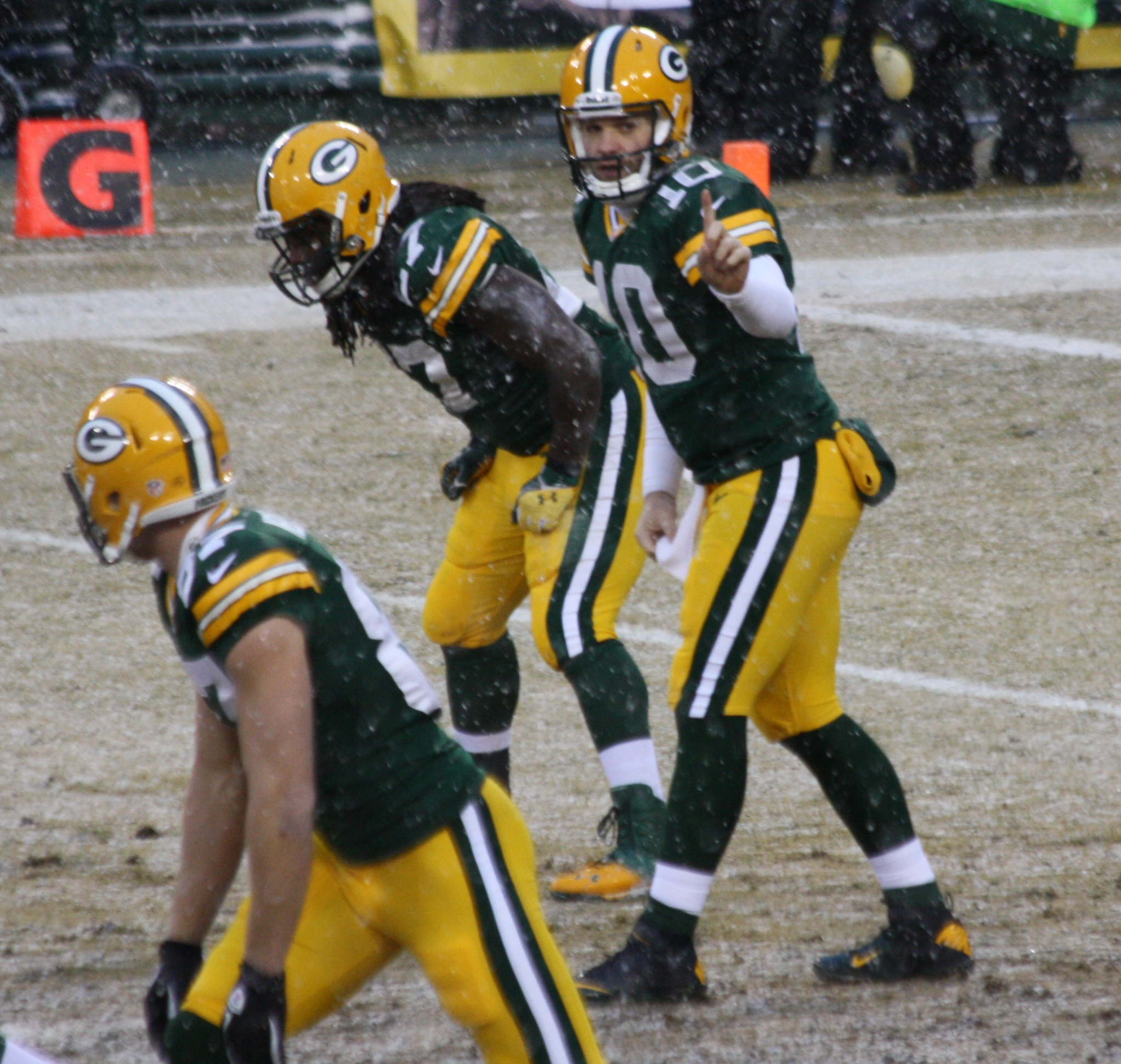
Flynn calling signals

On December 15, 2013, Flynn led the Packers back from a 26–3 halftime deficit against the Cowboys to come out with a 37–36 victory. He led five consecutive touchdown drives in the 2nd half, and threw for 299 yards with 4 touchdowns and 1 interception.

On December 22, 2013, Flynn threw for 232 yards with 1 touchdown and 1 interception in a 38–31 loss to the Pittsburgh Steelers.

His contract expired at the end of the season. On April 15, 2014, Flynn was given a new 1-year deal with the team worth $1.07 million. During his final season with the Green Bay Packers, Flynn appeared in four games, and finished the season with 66 yards, no touchdowns and one interception. Flynn was not re-signed and became a free agent on March 8, 2015.

=== New England Patriots ===
Flynn was signed by the New England Patriots on June 11, 2015, with the intention of adding a veteran presence for second-year quarterback Jimmy Garoppolo during Tom Brady’s four game suspension. He was assigned number 8. On August 10, 2015, the Patriots released Flynn to make room for Ryan Lindley.

=== New York Jets ===
Flynn was signed by the New York Jets on August 19, 2015, to a one-year contract. He was assigned number 5. On September 3, 2015, Flynn started the Jets' preseason week 4 match-up against the Philadelphia Eagles, throwing 10–14 for 136 yards, 2 touchdowns, and 1 interception. On September 5, 2015, Flynn was released.

=== New Orleans Saints ===
On November 15, 2015, Flynn was signed by the New Orleans Saints after back-up quarterback Luke McCown suffered a season-ending injury. The 2015 season marked the first in Flynn's career in which he did not appear in a regular season game.

== Career statistics ==
=== NFL ===
==== Regular season ====
Year	Team	Games			Passing								Rushing				Sacks		Fumbles (Note: Fumbles lost data taken from Pro Football Reference career game log)	
Year	Team	GP	GS	Record	Cmp	Att	Pct	Yds	Y/A	TD	Int	Rtg	Att	Yds	Avg	TD	Sck	SckY	Fum	Lost
2008	GB	7	0	–	2	5	40	6	1.2	0	0	47.9	4	4	1	0	0	0	1	0
2009	GB	15	0	–	7	12	58.3	58	4.8	0	1	36.1	5	−5	−1	0	1	6	0	0
2010	GB	7	1	0–1	40	66	60.6	433	6.6	3	2	82.4	9	26	2.9	0	7	38	1	1
2011	GB	5	1	1–0	33	49	67.3	518	10.6	6	2	124.8	13	−6	−0.5	1	5	18	1	1
2012	SEA	3	0	–	5	9	55.5	68	7.6	0	0	79.9	4	−5	-1.3	0	0	0	0	0
2013	OAK	2	1	0–1	22	34	64.7	246	7.2	1	1	83.7	3	4	1.3	0	7	33	3	2
2013	BUF	0	0	DNP																
2013	GB	5	4	2–2	102	166	61.4	1,146	6.9	7	4	86.1	17	61	3.6	0	17	102	4	4
2014	GB	7	0	–	8	16	50	66	4.1	0	1	34.9	10	−10	−1	0	2	12	1	1
2015	NO	0	0	DNP																
Career		51	7	3–4	219	357	61.3	2,541	7.1	17	11	85.9	65	69	1.1	1	39	209	11	9

==== Playoffs ====
Year	Team	Games			Passing								Rushing				Sacks		Fumbles	
Year	Team	GP	GS	Record	Cmp	Att	Pct	Yds	Y/A	TD	Int	Rtg	Att	Yds	Avg	TD	Sck	SckY	Fum	Lost
2009	GB	0	0	DNP																
2010	GB	1	0	–	0	0	0.0	0	0.0	0	0	0.0	1	-1	-1.0	0	0	0	0	0
2011	GB	0	0	DNP																
2012	SEA	0	0	DNP																
2013	GB	0	0	DNP																
2014	GB	0	0	DNP																
Career		1	0	–	0	0	0.0	0	0.0	0	0	0.0	1	-1	-1.0	0	0	0	0	0

=== College ===
Year	Team	Passing								Rushing			
Year	Team	Cmp	Att	Pct	Yds	Y/A	TD	Int	Rtg	Att	Yds	Avg	TD
2004	LSU	4	10	40.0	99	9.9	1	0	156.2	3	-5	-1.7	0
2005	LSU	27	48	56.3	457	9.5	7	1	180.2	12	44	3.7	0
2006	LSU	12	20	60.0	133	6.7	2	1	138.9	13	86	6.6	1
2007	LSU	202	359	56.3	2,407	6.7	21	11	125.8	100	215	2.2	4
Career		245	437	56.1	3,096	7.1	31	13	133.0	128	340	2.7	5

== Personal life ==
Flynn married his long-time girlfriend Lacey Minchew on June 22, 2013.
