= 1998 Humboldt State Lumberjacks football team =

American college football season

1998 Humboldt State Lumberjacks football
- Conference: Columbia Football Association
- Record: 4–7 (3–2 CFA)
- Head coach: Fred Whitmire (8th season)
- Home stadium: Redwood Bowl

1998 Columbia Football Association standings
	Conf.			Overall
Team	W		L	W		L
No. 15 Central Washington † $	4	–	1	7	–	4
Western Washington *	3	–	2	5	–	5
Humboldt State *	3	–	2	4	–	7
Western Oregon	2	–	3	4	–	5
Southern Oregon	2	–	3	4	–	6
Simon Fraser	1	–	4	3	–	6
$ – Conference champion; † – NAIA playoff participant * – Also classified as NCAA Division II independent; Rankings from NAIA poll

The 1998 Humboldt State Lumberjacks football team represented Humboldt State University—now known as California State Polytechnic University, Humboldt—as a member of the Columbia Football Association (CFA) during the 1998 NCAA Division II football season. Led by eighth-year head coach Fred Whitmire, the Lumberjacks compiled an overall record of 4–7 with a mark of 3–2 in conference play, tying for second place in the CFA. The team was outscored by its opponents 288 to 222 for the season. Humboldt State played home games at the Redwood Bowl in Arcata, California.

== Schedule ==
Date	Opponent	Site	Result	Attendance	Source
September 5	Rocky Mountain*	Redwood Bowl; Arcata, CA	L 24–30		
September 12	at Weber State*	Wildcat Stadium; Ogden, UT	L 12–41	8,836	
September 19	Willamette*	Redwood Bowl; Arcata, CA	L 7–24		
September 26	at Montana Tech*	Alumni Coliseum; Butte, MT	L 17–45		
October 3	at Western Washington	Civic Stadium; Bellingham, WA	L 17–36		
October 10	Simon Fraser	Redwood Bowl; Arcata, CA	W 39–16		
October 17	at Western Oregon	McArthur Field; Monmouth, OR	W 27–24		
October 24	at Azusa Pacific*	Cougar Athletic Stadium; Azusa, CA	L 13–20	4,123	
October 31	at Menlo*	Connor Field; Atherton, CA	W 24–14		
November 7	Southern Oregon	Redwood Bowl; Arcata, CA	W 16–0		
November 14	Central Washington	Redwood Bowl; Arcata, CA	L 26–38		
*Non-conference game
