= Dave Drake =

American football coach (1918–1995)

Biographical details
- Born: July 9, 1918
- Died: August 9, 1995 (aged 77)

Coaching career (HC unless noted)
- 1966: Azusa Pacific

Head coaching record
- Overall: 5–4

David Drake (July 9, 1918 – August 9, 1995) was an American football coach. He was the second head football coach at Azusa Pacific College—now known as Azusa Pacific University—in Azusa, California, serving for one season, in 1966, and compiling a record of 5–4.
