= Tom Nelson (American football coach) =

American football coach

Coaching career (HC unless noted)
- 1965: Azusa Pacific

Head coaching record
- Overall: 1–6

Tom Nelson is an American former football coach. He was the first head football coach at Azusa Pacific College—now known as Azusa Pacific University—in Azusa, California, serving for one season, in 1965, and compiling a record of 1–6.
