= Bob Damewood =

American football coach (1940–2009)

Biographical details
- Born: June 7, 1940; Los Angeles, California, U.S.
- Died: June 28, 2009 (aged 69); Glendora, California, U.S.

Coaching career (HC unless noted)
- 1970–1971: Azusa Pacific

Head coaching record
- Overall: 7–10

Robert David Damewood (June 7, 1940 – June 28, 2009) was an American football coach. He was the fourth head football coach at Azusa Pacific College—now known as Azusa Pacific University—in Azusa, California, serving for two seasons, from 1970 to 1971, and compiling a record of 7–10.

Damewood died on June 28, 2009, of a stroke.
