= Jim Milhon =

American football coach

Biographical details
- Born: 1935 (age 90–91)

Coaching career (HC unless noted)
- 1978–1994: Azusa Pacific

Head coaching record
- Overall: 81–69–4

Jim Milhon (born 1935) is an American former football coach. He was the sixth head football coach for the Azusa Pacific University in Azusa, California, serving for 17 seasons, from 1978 until 1994, and compiling a record of 81–69–4.
