= 1998 NAIA football season =

College football season

- Regular season: August–November 1998
- Postseason: November 21–December 19, 1998
- National Championship: Jim Carroll Stadium; Savannah, TN
- Champion: Azusa Pacific
- Player of the Year: Jack Williams (RB, Azusa Pacific)

The 1998 NAIA football season, as part of the 1998 college football season in the United States, was the 43rd season of college football sponsored by the NAIA.

The season was played from August to November 1998, culminating in the 1998 NAIA Football National Championship, played this year on December 19, 1998, at Jim Carroll Stadium in Savannah, Tennessee.

Azusa Pacific defeated Olivet Nazarene in the championship game, 17–14, to win their first NAIA national title.

Jack Williams, running back from Azusa Pacific, was named the 1998 NAIA Football Player of the Year.

== Conference standings ==
1998 Columbia Football Association standings
	Conf.			Overall
Team	W		L	W		L
No. 15 Central Washington † $	4	–	1	7	–	4
Western Washington *	3	–	2	5	–	5
Humboldt State *	3	–	2	4	–	7
Western Oregon	2	–	3	4	–	5
Southern Oregon	2	–	3	4	–	6
Simon Fraser	1	–	4	3	–	6
$ – Conference champion; † – NAIA playoff participant * – Also classified as NCAA Division II independent; Rankings from NAIA poll

1998 Frontier Conference football standings
	Conf.			Overall
Team	W		L	W		L
No. 2 Rocky Mountain $^	6	–	0	9	–	1
Montana Tech	3	–	3	5	–	5
Western Montana	2	–	4	2	–	7
Carroll (MT)	1	–	5	1	–	8
$ – Conference champion; ^ – NAIA playoff participant; Rankings from NAIA poll

1998 Heart of America Athletic Conference football standings
	Conf.			Overall
Team	W		L	W		L
No. 5 Benedictine (KS) $	8	–	1	9	–	2
No. 16 Lindenwood ^	7	–	2	8	–	3
No. 23 Missouri Valley	6	–	3	7	–	3
Evangel	5	–	4	5	–	4
MidAmerica Nazarene	5	–	4	6	–	5
Baker	5	–	4	5	–	5
Graceland	4	–	5	4	–	6
William Jewell	3	–	6	3	–	7
Culver–Stockton	2	–	7	3	–	7
Central Methodist	0	–	9	0	–	10
$ – Conference champion; ^ – NAIA playoff participant; Rankings from NAIA poll

1998 Kansas Collegiate Athletic Conference football standings
	Conf.			Overall
Team	W		L	W		L
No. 3 Southwestern (KS) $^	7	–	1	9	–	2
No. 19 Ottawa	6	–	2	8	–	2
Bethany (KS)	5	–	3	6	–	3
Kansas Wesleyan	4	–	4	5	–	4
Bethel (KS)	4	–	4	5	–	5
McPherson	4	–	4	5	–	5
Sterling	3	–	5	4	–	6
Friends	2	–	6	2	–	8
Tabor	1	–	7	1	–	9
$ – Conference champion; ^ – NAIA playoff participant; Rankings from NAIA poll

1998 Mid-South Conference football standings
	Conf.			Overall
Team	W		L	W		L
No. 9 Georgetown (KY) +^	6	–	1	9	–	3
No. 20 North Greenville +	6	–	1	7	–	3
No. 18 Lambuth	5	–	2	7	–	3
No. 24 Campbellsville	4	–	3	7	–	4
Cumberland (TN)	4	–	3	6	–	5
Belhaven	2	–	5	4	–	6
Cumberland (KY)	1	–	6	3	–	7
Union (KY)	0	–	7	0	–	10
+ – Conference co-champions; ^ – NAIA playoff participant; Rankings from NAIA poll

1998 Mid-States Football Association standings
	Conf.			Overall
Team	W		L	W		L
Mideast League
No. 12 Malone x^	5	–	1	7	–	4
No. 14 Tri-State ^	4	–	2	11	–	3
No. 17 Geneva	4	–	2	8	–	3
Tiffin	3	–	3	6	–	5
Walsh	2	–	4	6	–	5
Urbana	2	–	4	5	–	6
Saint Francis (IN)	1	–	5	2	–	8
Midwest League
No. 7 Taylor x^	6	–	0	8	–	3
No. 11 Olivet Nazarene ^	5	–	1	11	–	3
McKendree	3	–	3	6	–	4
St. Ambrose	2	–	4	5	–	5
Iowa Wesleyan	2	–	4	3	–	8
Trinity International	2	–	4	2	–	8
Saint Xavier	1	–	5	1	–	9
x – League champion/co-champions ^ – NAIA playoff participant; Rankings from NAIA poll

1998 Nebraska-Iowa Athletic Conference football standings
	Conf.			Overall
Team	W		L	W		L
No. 1 Hastings $^	6	–	0	10	–	1
Doane	4	–	2	5	–	4
No. 22 Northwestern (IA)	3	–	3	7	–	3
Nebraska Wesleyan	3	–	3	6	–	4
Midland	3	–	3	4	–	6
Concordia (NE)	2	–	4	4	–	5
Dana	0	–	6	2	–	8
$ – Conference champion; ^ – NAIA playoff participant; Rankings from NAIA poll

1998 North Dakota College Athletic Conference football standings
	Conf.			Overall
Team	W		L	W		L
No. 10 Mary +^	5	–	1	8	–	3
No. 6 Jamestown +^	5	–	1	8	–	2
Dickinson State	4	–	2	6	–	3
Minnesota–Crookston	3	–	3	6	–	4
Minot State	2	–	4	4	–	5
Mayville State	2	–	4	2	–	8
Valley City State	0	–	6	0	–	10
+ – Conference co-champions; ^ – NAIA Division II playoff participant; Rankings from NAIA poll

1998 South Dakota-Iowa Intercollegiate Conference football standings
	Conf.			Overall
Team	W		L	W		L
No. 4 Sioux Falls $^	5	–	0	8	–	3
No. 13 Huron ^	4	–	1	10	–	3
Dakota State	3	–	2	7	–	3
Dakota Wesleyan	2	–	3	4	–	6
Black Hills State	1	–	4	1	–	9
South Dakota Tech	0	–	5	0	–	10
$ – Conference champion; ^ – NAIA playoff participant; Rankings from NAIA poll

1998 NAIA independents football records
	Conf.			Overall
Team	W		L	W		L
No. 8 Azusa Pacific ^		–		12	–	2
No. 21 NW Oklahoma State		–		7	–	3
No. 25 Eastern Oregon		–		6	–	4
Clinch Valley		–		4	–	5
Peru State		–		4	–	5
^ – NAIA playoff participant; Rankings from NAIA poll

== Conference champions ==
Conference	Champion	Record
Frontier	Rocky Mountain	6–0
Heart of America	Benedictine	8–1
Kansas	Southwestern (KS)	7–1
Mid-South	Georgetown (KY); North Greenville	6–1
Mid-States	Mideast Division: Malone; Midwest Division: Taylor	5–1; 6–0
Nebraska-Iowa	Hastings	6–0
North Dakota	Jamestown; Mary	5–1
South Dakota-Iowa	Sioux Falls	5–0

== Postseason ==
First Round; November 21, 1998; Campus sites
5	Benedictine (KS)*	28
14	Tri-State	33
9	Georgetown (KY)*	46
12	Malone	41
1	Hastings*	26
11	Olivet Nazarene	32
4	Sioux Falls*	29
10	Mary	25
3	Southwestern (KS)*	12
16	Lindenwood	10
6	Jamestown*	19
13	Huron	61
2	Rocky Mountain*	38
15	Central Washington	41†
8	Azusa Pacific*	31
7	Taylor	28

Quarterfinals; November 21, 1998; Campus sites
14	Tri-State	37
9	Georgetown (KY)*	23
11	Olivet Nazarene	37
4	Sioux Falls*	34
3	Southwestern (KS)	6
13	Huron*	52
15	Central Washington	28
8	Azusa Pacific*	35

Semifinals; December 5, 1998; Campus sites
14	Tri-State	28
11	Olivet Nazarene ‡	33
13	Huron	24
8	Azusa Pacific*	26

Championship; December 19, 1998; Savannah, TN
11	Olivet Nazarene	14
8	Azusa Pacific	17

- † demarcates Overtime
- ‡ Game played at Kankakee, Illinois

== See also ==
- 1998 NCAA Division I-A football season
- 1998 NCAA Division I-AA football season
- 1998 NCAA Division II football season
- 1998 NCAA Division III football season
