= John Crandall (American football) =

American football coach

Biographical details
- Born: April 10, 1931; Mount Vernon, Missouri, U.S.
- Died: August 23, 2008 (aged 77); Wichita, Kansas, U.S.

Coaching career (HC unless noted)
- 1967–1969: Azusa Pacific

Head coaching record
- Overall: 6–19–1

John Gardner Crandall Jr. (April 10, 1931 – August 23, 2008) was an American football coach. He was the third head football coach for at Azusa Pacific College—now known as Azusa Pacific University—in Azusa, California, serving for three seasons, from 1967 to 1969, and compiling a record of 6–19–1.

Crandall died of cancer in Wichita, Kansas in 2008.
