= Matt Flynn Game =

Notable regular season NFL game

Detroit Lions (10–5)	Green Bay Packers (14–1)
41	45
Head coach: Jim Schwartz	Head coach: Mike McCarthy
	1	2	3	4	Total
DET	9	10	15	7	41
GB	10	14	7	14	45
- Date: January 1, 2012
- Stadium: Lambeau Field; Green Bay, Wisconsin, U.S.
- Favorite: Lions by 3.5
- Referee: Walt Coleman
- Attendance: 70,294

TV in the United States
- Network: Fox
- Announcers: Thom Brennaman, Brian Billick, and Laura Okmin

The Matt Flynn Game was a regular season National Football League (NFL) game between the Detroit Lions and Green Bay Packers on January 1, 2012. The game, which was contested at Lambeau Field in Green Bay, Wisconsin, United States, became notable due to the performance of Matt Flynn, who at the time was the Packers' backup quarterback, behind starter Aaron Rodgers. The defending Super Bowl champion Packers had already secured the first seed in the playoffs and decided to rest Rodgers, as well as other starters, to avoid injuries leading into the playoffs. Flynn led the Packers to a high-scoring, 45–41 victory, with six touchdown passes and 480 passing yards, both single-game records for the Packers. Flynn's counterpart on the Lions, quarterback Matthew Stafford, threw five touchdowns of his own, gaining 520 passing yards.

Although the game had little overall impact on the standings, Flynn's performance made him a target for many teams during the offseason. Riding the coattails of his performance and tutelage under Rodgers, Flynn signed a multi-year contract with the Seattle Seahawks during the offseason, presumably as the expected starter. However, the Seahawks also drafted Russell Wilson during the offseason and both Wilson and Flynn competed for the starting job. Flynn was beaten for the position and traded a year later, while Wilson would go on to be the Seahawks starter for 10 seasons. The Packers' victory set a team record for wins in a season at 15. Commentators also noted that resting Rodgers may have led to the Packers' eventual demise in the playoffs, a 37–20 upset loss to the New York Giants in the Divisional round.

== Background ==
The Detroit Lions began the 2011 NFL season with a record of 5–0, although they lost 5 of their next 7 games, including a 27–15 loss to the Green Bay Packers in Week 12. The Lions returned to better form, going on a three-game winning streak leading into the last game of the season. Although the Lions already secured a playoff spot, a victory could have secured the fifth seed in the playoffs.

The Packers, who had won Super Bowl XLV the previous year, began the season with a record of 13–0, before a surprising 19–14 loss to the Kansas City Chiefs. The Packers won their penultimate game of the season before hosting the Lions at Lambeau Field in Green Bay, Wisconsin, for the final game. They entered the last game of the season with a record of 14–1, while the Lions had a record of 10–5. Having already secured the first seed in the playoffs and a bye week during the Wild Card round, the Packers decided to rest their starters to keep key players, such as quarterback Aaron Rodgers, from getting hurt before the playoffs. Other key players for the Packers, such as Greg Jennings, Randall Cobb, James Starks, Clay Matthews III, Bryan Bulaga, and Charles Woodson were held out of the game due to injury or for rest. Backup quarterback Matt Flynn was named the starter for the game. The Lions were 3.5 point favorites.

== Game summary ==
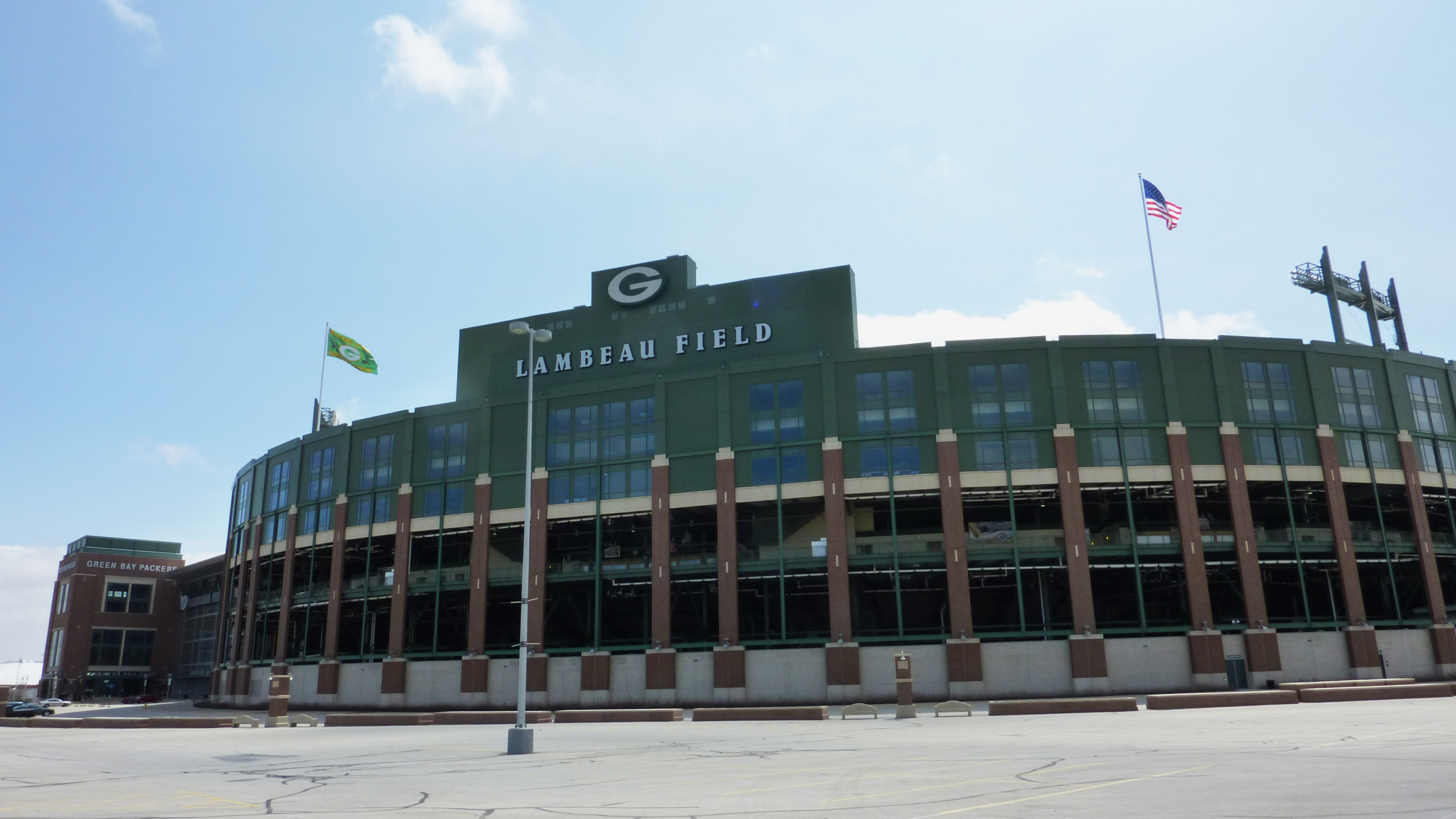
Lambeau Field was the site of the game

=== First half ===
The Packers started the game with the ball, although Flynn fumbled on the drive and the Lions took over with a short field. The Lions scored quickly on an eight-yard touchdown pass from Matthew Stafford to Titus Young. On the ensuing kickoff, Packers kick returner Pat Lee let the ball hit the ground and it bounced directly at him, ricocheting off his legs. Lee was standing in the end zone and the ball briefly came out of the end zone. Lee reached for the ball, gained possession, and knelt, attempting to establish a touchback. However, since the ball left the end zone and was brought back in, the Lions scored a safety, good for two points and possession of the ball after a free kick punt. On the next drive, with a 9–0 lead, the Lions went three-and-out, punting the ball back to the Packers. The Packers put together a 15-play, 64-yard drive, although the Lions stopped the Packers on the four-yard line, forcing a field goal attempt, which was converted by Mason Crosby. The Lions regained possession, leading 9–3, and Stafford completed two long passes to get to mid-field. However, Stafford threw a short pass to Kevin Smith, who fumbled the ball, which was recovered by the Packers.

Starting at mid-field, the Packers drove 48 yards in 7 plays, capped by a 7-yard touchdown pass from Flynn to Jordy Nelson. With the extra point, the Packers took their first lead of the game, 10–9. The Lions and Packers exchanged punts on the next two drives, before exchanging touchdowns on the subsequent two drives. The Lions scored first on a 10-play, 68-yard drive ending in a 13-yard touchdown pass to Calvin Johnson. The Lions 16–10 lead did not last long, though. After an incompletion on the first play of the Packers next drive, Flynn threw a short pass to Ryan Grant, who ran the length of the field for an 80-yard touchdown reception, putting the Packers back up by one point, 17–16. On the ensuing kickoff, the Lions fumbled the ball, which was recovered by Crosby. The Packers could not capitalize on the turnover, with Flynn throwing an interception on his second pass of the drive. The Lions regained the lead with a field goal after a short drive, retaking the lead 19–17. The Packers quickly scored again, capping a 79-yard drive with a 36-yard touchdown pass from Flynn to Nelson. Each team had their next drive end in a missed field goal, ending the half with the Packers up 24–19.

=== Second half ===
The Lions began the second half with the ball, but after driving 66 yards, Stafford was intercepted by Jarrett Bush. The Packers went three-and-out though, giving the ball back to the Lions. Stafford completed six passes on the next drive, including a two-yard touchdown pass to Young, his second of the day. The Lions kicked the extra point to take a 26–24 lead. The Packers again struck back quickly, this time on a 58-yard touchdown pass from Flynn to Nelson, his third touchdown reception of the game. The Packers 31–26 lead did not last long though, as the Lions took the ensuing drive 85 yards in just 6 plays, including a 41-yard catch by Johnson. Stafford threw his fourth touchdown of the game, this time to Smith. The Lions were successful on a two-point conversion, taking the lead back, 34–31. The Packers went three-and-out on their next drive, while the Lions turned the ball over on downs following the Packers punt. After the turnover-on-downs, the Packers drove 64 yards, punctuated by a 35-yard touchdown pass from Flynn to Donald Driver; the Packers regained the lead, 38–34. Both teams went three-and-out on consecutive drives. The Lions took over on their own seven-yard line with about five minutes left in the game, down by four points. They drove the length of the field, with Stafford completing five passes, including a 12-yard touchdown pass to Tony Scheffler. With the extra point, the Lions took a 41–38 lead with just over two minutes left in the game. The Packers again scored quickly, with a 40-yard pass from Flynn to James Jones doing most of the damage. Flynn threw a four-yard touchdown pass, his sixth of the game, to Jermichael Finley to give the Packers the lead again, 45–41. With just over a minute left in the game, the Lions took over needing a touchdown to win. Stafford completed three consecutive passes for a total of 43 yards, but on his fourth throw Sam Shields intercepted the ball to secure the Packers victory. Flynn knelt the ball once to run out the rest of the game clock.

=== Box score ===
Week Seventeen: Detroit Lions at Green Bay Packers – Game summary

Quarter	1	2	3	4	Total
Lions	9	10	15	7	41
Packers	10	14	7	14	45

at Lambeau Field, Green Bay, Wisconsin

- Date: January 1
- Game time: 12:00 pm. CST/1:00 pm. EST
- Game weather: 31 °F (−1 °C), cloudy, 20 mph wind, 31 °F (−1 °C) wind-chill factor
- Game attendance: 70,294
- Referee: Walt Coleman
- TV announcers (Fox): Thom Brennaman, Brian Billick, and Laura Okmin
- Sources: Pro-Football-Reference.com and ESPN.com

Game information

First quarter

- DET – Titus Young 8-yard touchdown pass from Matthew Stafford (Jason Hanson kick), 13:05. Detroit 7–0. 5 plays, 34 yards, 1:09.
- DET – Pat Lee tackled into the end zone by team for a safety, 13:00. Detroit 9–0. 0 plays, 0 yards, 0:00.
- GB – Mason Crosby 22-yard field goal, 5:58. Detroit 9–3. 15 plays, 64 yards, 5:39.
- GB – Jordy Nelson 7-yard touchdown pass from Matt Flynn (Mason Crosby kick), 00:21. Packers 10–9. 7 plays, 48 yards, 4:01.

Second quarter

- DET – Calvin Johnson 13-yard touchdown pass from Matthew Stafford (Hanson kick), 13:05. Detroit 16–9. 10 plays, 68 yards, 4:11.
- GB – Ryan Grant 80-yard touchdown pass from Matt Flynn (Mason Crosby kick), 8:13. Packers 17–16. 2 plays, 80 yards, 0:18.
- DET – Jason Hanson 30-yard field goal, 5:57. Detroit 19–17. 5 plays, 27 yards, 1:25.
- GB – Jordy Nelson 36-yard touchdown pass from Matt Flynn (Crosby kick), 3:43. Packers 24–19. 4 plays, 79 yards, 2:16.

Third quarter

- DET – Titus Young 2-yard touchdown pass from Matthew Stafford (Hanson kick), 6:44. Detroit 26–24. 7 plays, 68 yards, 3:32.
- GB – Jordy Nelson 58-yard touchdown pass from Matt Flynn (Crosby kick), 4:41. Packers 31–26. 4 plays, 80 yards, 2:07.
- DET – Kevin Smith 5-yard touchdown pass from Matthew Stafford (Tony Scheffler–Matthew Stafford pass), 2:13. Detroit 34–31. 6 plays, 85 yards, 2:25.

Fourth quarter

- GB – Donald Driver 35-yard touchdown pass from Matt Flynn (Crosby kick), 8:18 Packers 38–34. 7 plays, 64 yards, 4:40.
- DET – Tony Scheffler 12-yard touchdown pass from Matthew Stafford (Hanson kick), 2:44. Detroit 41–38. 7 plays, 93 yards, 2:22.
- GB – Jermichael Finley 4-yard touchdown pass from Matt Flynn (Crosby kick), 1:13. Packers 45–41. 8 plays, 75 yards, 1:29.

Detroit Lions stats

Passing

- Matthew Stafford – 36/59, 520 yards, 5 touchdowns, 2 interceptions

Rushing

- Kevin Smith – 9 rushes, 35 yards
- Maurice Morris – 4 rushes, 13 yards
- Stefan Logan – 1 rush, 16 yards
- Nate Burleson – 1 rush, 9 yards

Receiving

- Calvin Johnson – 11 receptions, 244 yards, 1 touchdown
- Brandon Pettigrew – 7 receptions, 116 yards
- Nate Burleson – 6 receptions, 45 yards
- Tony Scheffler – 4 reception, 65 yards, 1 touchdown
- Kevin Smith – 4 receptions, 26 yards, 1 touchdown
- Titus Young – 4 receptions, 24 yards, 2 touchdowns
Green Bay Packers stats

Passing

- Matt Flynn – 31/44, 480 yards, 6 touchdowns, 1 interception

Rushing

- Ryan Grant – 12 rushes, 48 yards
- Brandon Saine – 8 rushes, 28 yards
- John Kuhn – 2 rushes, 5 yards
- Matt Flynn – 2 rushes, 0 yards

Receiving

- Jordy Nelson – 9 receptions, 162 yards, 3 touchdowns
- Jermichael Finley – 7 receptions, 64 yards, 1 touchdown
- James Jones – 6 receptions, 89 yards
- Brandon Saine – 3 receptions, 17 yards
- Donald Driver – 2 receptions, 52 yards, 1 touchdown
- John Kuhn – 2 receptions, 10 yards
- Ryan Grant – 1 reception, 80 yards, 1 touchdown
- D. J. Williams – 1 reception, 6 yards

=== Analysis ===
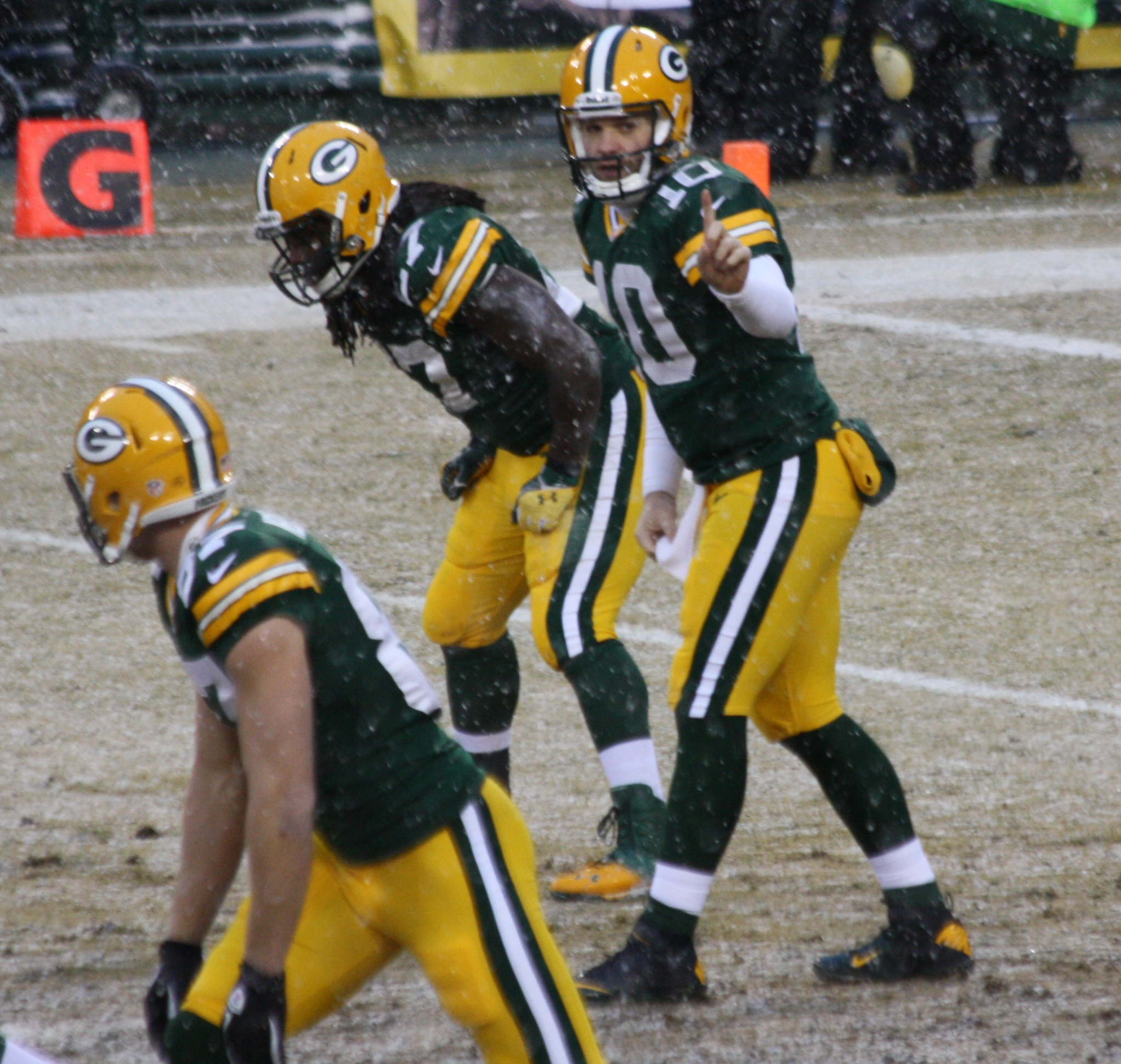
Matt Flynn (#10), shown here in 2013, secured a lucrative contract after his performance in place of starter Aaron Rodgers.

Post-game analysis noted the exciting, back-and-forth, and high-scoring nature of the game. There were 11 lead changes after Detroit went up 9–0 in the first quarter. Both quarterback performances were also highlighted, with a total of 11 touchdown passes and 1,000 passing yards between Flynn and Stafford. Stafford's yardage total for the game put him over 5,000 passing yards for the season, becoming just the fourth player to reach that milestone in NFL history. Each team had a standout wide receiver, with Detroit's Johnson catching 11 passes for 244 yards and a touchdown, while Green Bay's Nelson had 9 catches, 162 yards and 3 touchdowns. The game lacked defensive execution, although it was noted that the return of key starters for the Packers in the playoffs, including Matthews and Woodson, should boost the defense moving forward.

== Outcome ==
Both teams' seasons ended in their first playoff game. The Lions were blown out 45–28 in the Wild Card round to the New Orleans Saints, while the Packers were blown out 37–20 in the Divisional Round by the New York Giants. Even though Packers head coach Mike McCarthy noted that the team was well-prepared going into the playoffs, sports commentators questioned the impact of resting the team's starters, especially Rodgers, during the Detroit game, with some speculation that combined with the Packers bye week during the Wild Card round, the team spent too much time away from competitive football and were rusty.

=== Legacy ===
In securing the victory, the Packers recorded their 15th win of the season, the most in a regular season in their history. Flynn's performance set two Packers team records: most passing touchdowns in a game (6) and most passing yards in a game (480). Both records were tied by Rodgers over the next few seasons. Rodgers threw six touchdowns in a game in both 2012 and 2014, and threw for 480 yards in a game in 2013. Stafford's 520 yards passing were the most ever in a game against the Packers and the most passing yards at Lambeau Field, while Johnson's 244 yards receiving were the most ever against the Packers. The combined passing yards total, 971, was the most in a single game in NFL history, while Flynn and Stafford became the first quarterbacks to each throw for over 400 yards and 5 passing touchdowns in the same game. The teams set a number of other NFL, team, and individual offensive records.

The biggest impact of the game however, was to Flynn's impending free agency. After having served as Rodgers' backup for four seasons, there was already interest from other teams to sign Flynn after the end of the season. This interest expanded significantly after his performance, ultimately helping him secure a three-year, $26 million deal from the Seattle Seahawks to be their presumed starting quarterback. The Seahawks drafted Russell Wilson a month after signing Flynn; Tarvaris Jackson (the Seahawks starter from the previous season), Wilson and Flynn battled in the preseason to be the starter. Wilson ultimately won the battle, securing the starting role for the next 10 seasons and winning Super Bowl XLVIII with the Seahawks. Flynn was traded to the Oakland Raiders after the season, released and then resigned by the Packers halfway through the 2013 NFL season after Rodgers was injured. He had another notable game during his second stint with the Packers in 2013. With his team trailing 26–3 against the Dallas Cowboys, Flynn threw four touchdown passes to beat the Cowboys 37–36 in what ended up being his second to last start in place of Rodgers. Flynn played for another two seasons before leaving the NFL for good.

== See also ==
- List of nicknamed NFL games and plays
