= 1998 Azusa Pacific Cougars football team =

American college football season

1998 Azusa Pacific Cougars football

NAIA national champion

NAIA National Championship Game, W 17–14 vs. Olivet Nazarene
- Conference: Independent
- Record: 12–2
- Head coach: Vic Shealy (4th season)
- Defensive coordinator: Gary Knecht (4th season)
- Home stadium: Cougar Athletic Stadium

1998 NAIA independents football records
	Conf.			Overall
Team	W		L	W		L
No. 8 Azusa Pacific ^		–		12	–	2
No. 21 NW Oklahoma State		–		7	–	3
No. 25 Eastern Oregon		–		6	–	4
Clinch Valley		–		4	–	5
Peru State		–		4	–	5
^ – NAIA playoff participant; Rankings from NAIA poll

The 1998 Azusa Pacific Cougars football team was an American football team that represented Azusa Pacific University as an independent during the 1998 NAIA football season. In their fourth and final season under head coach Vic Shealy, the Cougars compiled a 12–2 record and won the NAIA national championship.

The team opened the season losing two of its first four games before winning its final ten games. In their October 17 game against La Verne, the Cougars established a new school record with 634 yards of total offense. Senior quarterback Geoff Buffum passed for a school-record 416 yards and five touchdowns. Senior receiver also set a new school record with 238 receiving yards.

The Cougars qualified for the NAIA playoffs for the first time in the 34-year history of the Azusa Pacific football program. They defeated Huron (North Dakota) in the semifinal game by a 26–24 score.

In the NAIA National Championship Game, played at Jim Carroll Stadium in Savannah, Tennessee, they faced Olivet Nazarene. Azusa Pacific trailed, 14–7, at the end of the third quarter, but scored 10 points in the fourth quarter on a safety, a touchdown run by Jack Williams, and a two-point conversion, to win by a 17–14 score.

The team was led on offense by senior quarterback Geoff Buffum, senior receiver Dexter Davis and junior running back and cornerback Jack Williams, a transfer from BYU. Williams was named Most Outstanding Offensive Player of the NAIA Championship Game and finished the season with 1,642 rushing yards.

The team played its home games at Cougar Athletic Stadium in Azusa, California.

In January 1999, Shealy resigned as head coach at Azusa Pacific to become the defense backs coach for Air Force.

== Schedule ==
Date	Opponent	Site	Result	Attendance	Source
September 5	at San Diego	San Diego, CA	W 14–7	4,000	
September 12	Olivet Nazarene	Cougar Athletic Stadium; Azusa, CA	W 31–24	2,652	
September 19	at Central Washington	Ellensburg, WA	L 17–51	2,500	
September 26	at Hardin–Simmons	Shelton Stadium; Abilene, TX	L 17–30	2,749	
October 3	Chapman	Cougar Athletic Stadium; Azusa, CA	W 26–21	2,311	
October 17	La Verne	Cougar Athletic Stadium; Azusa, CA	W 42–22	2,315	
October 24	Humboldt State^{†}	Cougar Athletic Stadium; Azusa, CA	W 20–13	4,123	
October 31	at Whittier	Whittier, CA	W 27–9	1,107	
November 7	Occidental	Cougar Athletic Stadium; Azusa, CA	W 49–7	1,056	
November 14	at Pomona-Pitzer	Claremont, CA	W 14–0	700	
November 21	Taylor (IN)	Cougar Athletic Stadium; Azusa, CA (NAIA first round)	W 31–28	2,123	
November 28	Central Washington	Cougar Athletic Stadium; Azusa, CA (NAIA quarterfinal)	W 35–28	1,625	
December 5	Huron (ND)	Cougar Athletic Stadium; Azusa, CA (NAIA semifinal)	W 26–24	3,124	
December 19	vs. Olivet Nazarene	Jim Carroll Stadium; Savannah, TN (NAIA Championship Game)	W 17–14	5,000	
^{†}Homecoming
