= Rudy Carlton =

American football coach (born c. 1984)

Current position
- Title: Head coach
- Team: Oaks Christian School (CA)

Biographical details
- Born: c. 1984 (age 41–42); Littleton, Colorado, U.S.
- Education: Azusa Pacific University (2007)

Playing career
- 2002–2007: Azusa Pacific
- 2008: Texas Copperheads
- 2009: Boise Burn
- Position: Quarterback

Coaching career (HC unless noted)
- 2008–2009: Azusa Pacific (TE)
- 2010–2019: Azusa Pacific (OC)
- 2020: Azusa Pacific (Note: Carlton was named head football coach before the season was ultimately canceled due to COVID-19.)
- 2021–2022: West Florida (OC/QB)
- 2023–2025: JSerra Catholic HS (CA) (OC/QB)
- 2026-Present: Oaks Christian School (CA) (HC)

Head coaching record
- Overall: 0–0

Rudy Carlton (born c. 1984) is an American football coach. He currently serves as head coach at Oaks Christian School in Westlake Village, California. From 2023 to 2025, he was the offensive coordinator and quarterbacks coach for JSerra Catholic High School. He previously coached for Azusa Pacific, including a stint as the head coach in 2020 prior to the university cutting football. He also coached at West Florida. He played college football for Azusa Pacific as a quarterback and professionally for the Texas Copperheads and Boise Burn of af2.
