= Azusa Pacific Cougars football =

Former college football program

- First season: 1965; 61 years ago
- Head coach: A.J. Parnell; 1st season, 0–0 (–)
- Location: Azusa, California, U.S.
- Stadium: Citrus Stadium (capacity: 10,000)
- NCAA division: Division III
- Conference: SCIAC
- Colors: Brick and black

NAIA national championships
- 1998

Conference championships
- GNAC: 2013, 2014, 2016, 2018
- Website: athletics.apu.edu

The Azusa Pacific Cougars football program is a college football team that represents Azusa Pacific University in Azusa, California. The Cougars compete at the NCAA Division III level and are members of the Southern California Intercollegiate Athletic Conference (SCIAC).

Azusa Pacific revived its football program in 2025 after initially ending its program, then at the NCAA Division II level, in 2020.

Before the 2020 shutdown, the Cougars has been members of the Great Northwest Athletic Conference, joining in 2012. Before that, the Cougars had been an independent program in the NAIA.

The Cougars have had ten head coaches since their first recorded football game in 1965.

The most famous player to play for the Cougars is former NFL All-Pro running back Christian Okoye.

== History ==
=== Conferences ===
- NAIA independent (1997–2011)
- Great Northwest Athletic Conference (2012–2020)
- Inactive (2021–2025)
- Southern California Intercollegiate Athletic Conference (2026–present)

== Championships ==
=== National championships ===
Year	Association	Division	Head coach	Record	Opponent	Result
1998	NAIA (1)	Division I (1)	Vic Shealy	12–2	Olivet Nazarene	W, 17–14

== Playoff appearances ==
=== NCAA Division II ===
The Cougars appeared in the Division II playoffs two times with an overall record of 0–2.

Year	Round	Opponent	Result
2016	First Round	Sioux Falls	L, 21–34
2018	First Round	Tarleton State	L, 0–58

=== NAIA ===
The Cougars appeared in the NAIA playoffs eight times, with an overall record of 7–9.

Year	Round	Opponent	Result
1998	First Round; Quarterfinals; Semifinals; National Championship	Taylor; Central Washington; Huron; Olivet Nazarene	W, 31–28; W, 35–28; W, 26–24; W, 17–14
1999	First Round; Quarterfinals; Semifinals	Doane; Hastings; Georgetown (KY)	W, 31–12; W, 38–35; L, 35–66
2000	First Round	MidAmerica Nazarene	L, 21–27
2003	First Round	Mary (ND)	L, 2–20
2004	First Round; Quarterfinals; Semifinals	NW Oklahoma State; Sioux Falls; Carroll (MT)	W, 16–0; W, 24–3; L, 10–14
2005	First Round	Montana Tech	L, 17–24
2010	First Round	Carroll (MT)	L, 21–35
2011	First Round; Quarterfinals	Ottawa (KS); Carroll (MT)	W, 49–26; L, 14–17

== Head coaches ==
Name	Term
Tom Nelson	1965
Dave Drake	1966
John Crandall	1967–1969
Bob Damewood	1970–1971
Jerry Sconce	1972–1977
Jim Milhon	1978–1994
Vic Shealy	1995–1998
Pete Shinnick	1999–2005
Victor Santa Cruz	2006–2019
Rudy Carlton	2020
AJ Parnell	2026
