= 2010 East–West Shrine Game =

2010 Asset Protect East–West Shrine Game
- All–Star Bowl Game
East Team	West Team
13	10
Head coach: Romeo Crennel	Head coach: Marty Schottenheimer
	1	2	3	4	Total
East Team	0	6	0	7	13
West Team	0	3	0	7	10
- Date: January 23, 2010
- Season: 2009
- Stadium: Florida Citrus Bowl
- Location: Orlando, Florida
- MVP: O'Brien Schofield (defensive), Mike Kafka (offensive)
- National anthem: Kenny G
- Halftime show: Kenny G
- Attendance: 8,345

United States TV coverage
- Network: ESPN2
- Announcers: Bob Wischusen, Todd McShay, Brian Griese

The 2010 East–West Shrine Game was the 85th staging of the all-star college football exhibition game featuring NCAA Division I Football Bowl Subdivision players. The game featured over 100 players from the 2009 college football season, and prospects for the 2010 draft of the professional National Football League (NFL), as well as for the United Football League's inaugural draft. In the week prior to the game, scouts from all 32 NFL teams attended. The proceeds from the East-West Shrine Game benefit Shriners Hospitals for Children.

Marty Schottenheimer and Romeo Crennel served as the two teams' coaches for the game. The East team won by a 13–10 margin on the strength of a touchdown with just six seconds remaining. Wisconsin defensive end O'Brien Schofield and Northwestern quarterback Mike Kafka, both of the East team, were defensive and offensive MVPs, respectively.

Although no players from this game were chosen in the first round of the NFL Draft and only seven were chosen on the second day of the draft (rounds 2 & 3), a total of 34 participants were selected during the draft's seven rounds. This includes four selections by the Pittsburgh Steelers and three each by the Philadelphia Eagles and Green Bay Packers. Three Utah Utes football players and five offensive tackles from this game were selected in the draft.

== Game summary ==
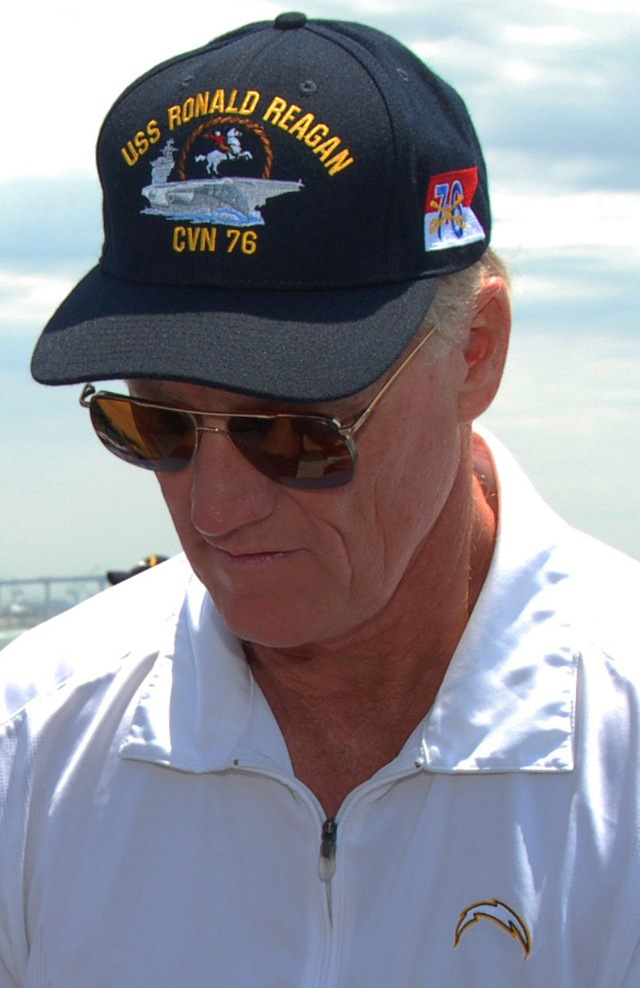
Marty Schottenheimer served as a head coach.

The West team was coached by Schottenheimer and the East by Crennel. The game was played on January 23, 2010, at 3:00 p.m. local time at Florida Citrus Bowl in Orlando, Florida. It was the first time the game was played in the state of Florida. The game had been hosted in California from 1925 through 2005 (with the exception of the 1942 game, held in New Orleans), and in Texas from 2006 through 2009. The game was broadcast on ESPN2. The combined score of 23 was the lowest since the 14–6 1992 East-West Shrine Game. The total attendance of 8,345 was the lowest in the history of the self-described longest running college all-star game. During the week before the game was played, the players interacted with general managers and scouts between practices.

In the first half, the East posted two interceptions. Schofield, who also had three tackles, made an interception of a pass by BYU quarterback Max Hall. Subsequently, Eskridge also intercepted a pass by Kansas quarterback Todd Reesing. The only first half scoring came on field goals. Joshua Shene of Ole Miss posted field goals of 44 and 40 yards for the East. Texas placekicker Hunter Lawrence had a 47-yarder for the West. Shene's field goals both came in the final two minutes and fifteen seconds of the first half.

The West took a 10–6 lead with 6:59 left in the game when Hall connected with UCLA fullback Ryan Moya for an 8-yard touchdown pass. A key play on the drive was a 41-yard pass from Hall to Eastern Washington tight end Nathan Overbay as he was cutting across the middle of a wide-open field. BYU's Dennis Pitta then caught a 17-yard reception.

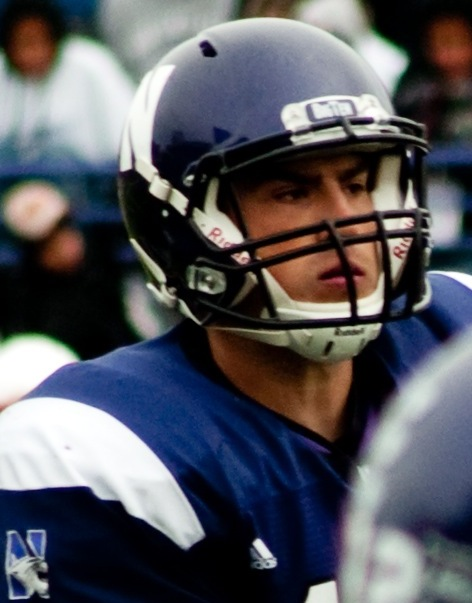
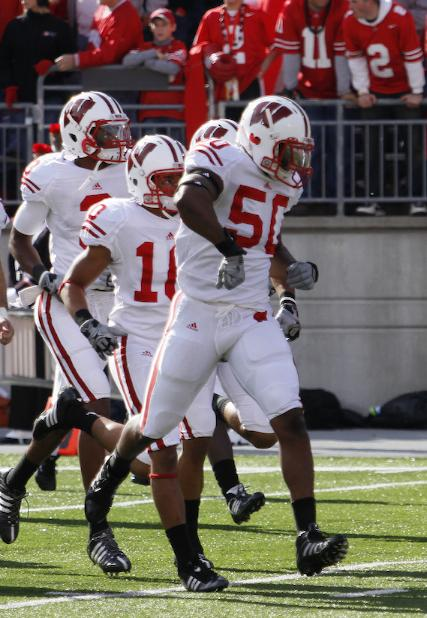
MVPs Mike Kafka and O'Brien Schofield

Kafka threw the game-winning touchdown to Penn State tight end Andrew Quarless with six seconds left, resulting in the 13–10 victory over the West. The touchdown capped an 11-play 55-yard game-winning drive. The play before the touchdown, Kafka had scrambled out of the grasp of a swarm of defenders for a 9-yard gain. During the drive Freddie Barnes of Bowling Green caught three consecutive passes of 12, 7, and 10 yards. The final play was set up after Kafka eluded a sack during a 2nd down and 10 yards situation on the West 11-yard line which led to a timeout with 12 seconds left before Kafka connected with Quarless in the back of the end zone.

Kafka was 18 of 27 for 150 yards and Michigan State's Blair White made 7 receptions for 93 yards for the East. Hall was 7 of 12 for 119 yards, a touchdown, and an interception and Pitta recorded 4 receptions for 72 yards for the West. The game saw no one accumulate more than 28 total rushing yards from scrimmage and no run was longer than 16 yards. In addition to the aforementioned players, the defensive standouts for the East on Saturday were Virginia Tech's Kam Chancellor (7 tackles), USF's Kion Wilson (6 tackles, forced fumble) and Ole Miss' Greg Hardy, Jr. (5 tackles, sack). The West were led by seven tackles from Kansas' Darrell Stuckey and six tackles and three pass breakups from Texas Tech's Jamar Wall.

According to the release from Shriners International Headquarters and several other sources, Schofield and Kafka of the east team were defensive and offensive MVPs, respectively. However, according to the Associated Press press release that was published by ESPN, Sports Illustrated and several other sources, Eskridge was selected as defensive MVP.

=== Scoring summary ===
Scoring summary

Quarter	Time	Drive			Team	Scoring information	Score	
Quarter	Time	Plays	Yards	TOP	Team	Scoring information	East	West
2	5:56				West	47-yard field goal by Hunter Lawrence	0	3
2	2:15				East	44-yard field goal by Joshua Shene	3	3
2	0:05				East	40-yard field goal by Joshua Shene	6	3
4	6:59				West	Ryan Moya 8-yard touchdown reception from Max Hall, Hunter Lawrence kick good	6	10
4	0:06				East	Andrew Quarless 2-yard touchdown reception from Mike Kafka, Joshua Shene kick good	13	10
"TOP" = time of possession. For other American football terms, see Glossary of American football.							13	10

=== Statistical leaders ===
	East			West		
	Player	Yards	TDs	Player	Yards	TDs
Leading Passer	Mike Kafka	150	1	Max Hall	119	1
Leading Rusher	Andre Dixon	24	0	Pat Paschall	28	0
Leading Receiver	Blair White	93	0	Dennis Pitta	72	0

== Coaching staff ==
=== West Team ===
Name	Position
Marty Schottenheimer	Head coach
Gary Brown	Running backs/Special teams
Ray Brown	Offensive line
Gerald Carr	Quarterbacks
Jay Hayes	Defensive line
Keenan McCardell	Wide receivers
Marlon McCree	Defensive backs
Kurt Schottenheimer	Linebacker/Defensive coordinator
Mike Stock	Tight ends/Special teams
Rob Price	Assistant Coach

=== East Team ===
Name	Position
Romeo Crennel	Head coach
Dave Atkins	Running backs
Pep Hamilton	Quarterbacks
Sam Mills, Jr.	Tight ends/Special teams
Robert Prince	Wide receivers
Will Shields	Offensive line
Vantz Singletary	Linebackers
Richard Solomon	Defensive backs
Eric Washington	Defensive line

== Rosters ==
=== East team ===
Name	Position	School	Hometown
Ali Villanueva	Tight end	Army	Meridian, MS
Mike McLaughlin	Inside linebacker	Boston College	Woburn, MA
Freddie Barnes	Wide receiver	Bowling Green State University	Chicago, IL
Thomas Austin	Offensive guard	Clemson University	Clemson, SC
Chris Chancellor	Cornerback	Clemson University	Miami, FL
Kavell Conner	Outside linebacker	Clemson University	Richmond, VA
Patrick Simonds	Wide Receiver	Colgate University	Sidney, NY
Van Eskridge	Free safety	East Carolina University	Shelby, NC
John Skelton	Quarterback	Fordham University	El Paso, TX
Cord Howard	Offensive Guard	Georgia Tech	Phenix City, AL
Rodger Saffold III	Offensive tackle	Indiana University	Bedford, OH
Rahim Alem	Defensive end	Louisiana State University	New Orleans, LA
Richard Dickson	Fullback	Louisiana State University	Ocean Springs, MS
Blair White	Wide Receiver	Michigan State University	Saginaw, MI
Chris McCoy	Outside Linebacker	Middle Tennessee State	Villa Roca, MS
Clay Harbor	Tight End	Missouri State University	Dwight, IL
Jamar Chaney	Inside Linebacker	Mississippi State University	Ft. Pierce, FL
Ross Pospisil	Inside Linebacker	Navy	Temple, TX
Willie Young	Defensive End	North Carolina State University	Riviera Beach, FL
Mike Kafka	Quarterback	Northwestern University	Oak Lawn, IL
Jim Cordle	Center	Ohio State University	Lancaster, OH
Doug Worthington	Defensive tackle	Ohio State University	Athol Springs, NY
Jeremy Boone	Punter	Penn State University	Mechanicsburg, PA
Daryll Clark	Quarterback	Penn State University	Youngstown, OH
Andrew Quarless	Tight End	Penn State University	Long Island, NY
Mike Neal	Defensive Tackle	Purdue University	Merrillville, IN
Kevin Haslam	Offensive Tackle	Rutgers University	Mahwah, NJ
Andre Anderson	Running back	Tulane University	Stone Mountain, GA
Naaman Roosevelt	Wide Receiver	University at Buffalo	Buffalo, NY
Justin Woodall	Strong safety	University of Alabama	Oxford, MS
Mitch Petrus	Offensive Guard	University of Arkansas	Carlisle, AR
Torell Troup	Defensive Tackle	University of Central Florida	Conyers, GA
Andre Dixon	Running Back	University of Connecticut	North Brunswick, NJ
Lindsey Witten	Defensive End	University of Connecticut	Cleveland, OH
Kyle Calloway	Offensive Tackle	University of Iowa	Vail, AZ
Javarris James	Running Back	University of Miami	Immokalee, FL
A.J. Trump	Center	University of Miami	Palm Harbor, FL
Greg Hardy	Defensive End	University of Mississippi	Millington, TN
Joshua Shene	Kicker	University of Mississippi	Oklahoma City, OK
Aaron Berry	Cornerback	University of Pittsburgh	Harrisburg, PA
Nate Byham	Tight End	University of Pittsburgh	Franklin, PA
Darian Stewart	Strong Safety	University of South Carolina	Huntsville, AL
Kion Wilson	Inside Linebacker	University of South Florida	Miami, FL
Chris Scott	Offensive Tackle	University of Tennessee	Riverdale, GA
Barry Church	Strong Safety	University of Toledo	Pittsburgh, PA
Nate Collins	Defensive Tackle	University of Virginia	Port Chester, NY
Matt Morencie	Center	University of Windsor	Windsor, ON
O'Brien Schofield	Outside Linebacker	University of Wisconsin	Chicago, IL
Kam Chancellor	Free Safety	Virginia Tech	Norfolk, VA
Sergio Render	Offensive Guard	Virginia Tech	Newman, GA
Stephan Virgil	Cornerback	Virginia Tech	Rocky Mount, NC
Chris DeGeare	Offensive Guard	Wake Forest University	Kernersville, NC
Ben Staggs	Offensive Tackle	West Liberty University	Wooster, OH
Alric Arnett	Wide Receiver	West Virginia University	Belle Glade, FL
Patrick Stoudamire	Cornerback	Western Illinois University	Portland, OR

=== West team ===
Name	Position	School	Hometown
Chris Thomas	Safety	Air Force Academy	Westerville, OH
Dimitri Nance	Running Back	Arizona State University	Euless, TX
Carter Brunelle	Long Snapper	Baylor University	San Antonio, TX
Joe Pawelek	Inside Linebacker	Baylor University	San Antonio, TX
Max Hall	Quarterback	Brigham Young University	Mesa, AZ
Jan Jorgensen	Defensive End	Brigham Young University	Helper, UT
Dennis Pitta	Tight End	Brigham Young University	Moorpark, CA
Klint Kubiak	Safety	Colorado State University	Houston, TX
Cole Pemberton	Offensive Takle	Colorado State University	Highsland Ranch, CO
Shelley Smith	Offensive Guard	Colorado State University	Phoenix, AZ
Matt Nichols	Quarterback	Eastern Washington University	Cottonwood, CA
Nathan Overbay	Tight End	Eastern Washington University	Chehalis, WA
Seyi Ajirotutu	Wide Receiver	Fresno State University	El Dorado Hills, CA
Robert Malone	Punter	Fresno State University	Riverside, CA
Lonyae Miller	Running Back	Fresno State University	Fontana, CA
Reggie Stephens	Offensive Guard	Iowa State University	Dallas, TX
Jeffery Fitzgerald	Defensive End	Kansas State University	Richmond, VA
Thad Turner	Cornerback	Ohio University	Marietta, GA
Keith Toston	Running Back	Oklahoma State University	Angleton, TX
Keaton Kristick	Outside Linebacker	Oregon State University	Fountain Hills, AZ
Emmanuel Sanders	Wide Receiver	Southern Methodist University	Bellville, TX
Chris Marinelli	Offensive Tackle	Stanford University	Braintree, Massachusetts
Ekom Udofia	Defensive Tackle	Stanford University	Phoenix, AZ
Mike Hicks	Wide Receiver	Tennessee Martin	Jacksonville, FL
Michael Shumard	Offensive Guard	Texas A& M University	Fort Hood, TX
Marshall Newhouse	Offensive Tackle	Texas Christian University	Dallas, TX
Brandon Carter	Offensive Guard	Texas Tech University	Longview, TX
Jamar Wall	Cornerback	Texas Tech University	Plaview, TX
Terrence Austin	Wide Receiver	UCLA	Longbeach, CA
Reggie Carter	Inside Linebacker	UCLA	Los Angeles, CA
Ryan Moya	Fullback	UCLA	El Dorado Hills, CA
Alterraun Verner	Cornerback	UCLA	Carson, CA
Earl Mitchell	Defensive Tackle	University of Arizona	Houston, TX
Devin Ross	Cornerback	University of Arizona	Los Angeles, CA
Mike Tepper	Offensive Tackle	University of California	Cypress, CA
Verran Tucker	Wide Receiver	University of California	Lynwood, CA
Riar Geer	Tight End	University of Colorado	Grand Junction, CO
John Estes	Center	University of Hawaii	Stockton, CA
Kerry Meier	Wide Receiver	University of Kansas	Pittsburg, KS
Todd Reesing	Quarterback	University of Kansas	Austin, TX
Darrell Stuckey	Strong Safety	University of Kansas	Kansas City, KS
Lee Campbell	Outside Linebacker	University of Minnesota	Naples, FL
Jaron Baston	Defensive Tackle	University of Missouri	Blue Springs, MO
James Ruffin	Defensive End	University of Northern Iowa	Burnsville, MN
Brian Jackson	Cornerback	University of Oklahoma	DeSoto, TX
T. J. Ward	Free Safety	University of Oregon	Antioch, CA
Jordan Sisco	Wide Receiver	University of Regina	Regina, SK
Hunter Lawrence	Kicker	University of Texas	Boerne, TX
Robert Johnson	Safety	University of Utah	Los Angeles, CA
David Reed	Wide Receiver	University of Utah	New Britain, CT
Stevenson Sylvester	Outside Linebacker	University of Utah	Las Vegas, NV
Daniel Te'o Nesheim	Defensive Tackle	University of Washington	Waikoloa, HI
Jason Beauchamp	Outside Linebacker	UNLV	San Diego, CA
Martin Tevaseu	Defensive Tackle	UNLV	Boonville, CA
Kenny Alfred	Center	Washington State University	Gig Harbor, WA

== 2010 NFL draft ==
Below is a list of the 34 players from this game that were drafted in the 2010 NFL draft. The Pittsburgh Steelers drafted four players that they scouted at this game and both the Philadelphia Eagles and the Green Bay Packers scouted three. The Arizona Cardinals, Buffalo Bills, Houston Texans, Tennessee Titans and Baltimore Ravens each selected two. Five offensive tackles, four defensive tackles, defensive ends, tight ends and wide receivers were drafted from this game. Three players from the Utah Utes as well as two each from the UCLA Bruins and Kansas Jayhawks were selected. Although 34 players were selected during the seven round draft, none were selected in the first round, while ten were chosen in the fifth and an additional 7 were chosen in the final seventh round.

The east team's Matt Morencie had already been drafted with the fifth pick of the third round in the 2009 CFL draft by the BC Lions. Jordan Sisco was selected with the first pick in the second round (8th overall) of the 2010 CFL draft by the Saskatchewan Roughriders.

Round #	Pick #	NFL team	Player	Position	College
2	33	St. Louis Rams	Rodger Saffold	Offensive tackle	Indiana
2	38	Cleveland Browns	T. J. Ward	Safety	Oregon
2	41	Buffalo Bills	Torrell Troup	Defensive tackle	UCF
2	56	Green Bay Packers	Mike Neal	Defensive tackle	Purdue
3	81	Houston Texans	Earl Mitchell	Defensive tackle	Arizona
3	82	Pittsburgh Steelers	Emmanuel Sanders	Wide receiver	SMU
3	86	Philadelphia Eagles ^{(from Green Bay)}	Daniel Te'o-Nesheim	Defensive end	Washington
4	104	Tennessee Titans ^{(from Seattle)}	Alterraun Verner	Cornerback	UCLA
4	110	San Diego Chargers ^{(from Miami)}	Darrell Stuckey	Safety	Kansas
4	114	Baltimore Ravens ^{(from Denver)}	Dennis Pitta	Tight end	BYU
4	122	Philadelphia Eagles ^{(from Green Bay)}	Mike Kafka	Quarterback	Northwestern
4	125	Philadelphia Eagles ^{(from Dallas)}	Clay Harbor	Tight end	Missouri State
4	130	Arizona Cardinals ^{(from New Orleans Saints)}	O'Brien Schofield	Defensive end	Wisconsin
5	147	New York Giants	Mitch Petrus	Guard	Arkansas
5	148	Tennessee Titans	Robert Johnson	Safety	Utah
5	151	Pittsburgh Steelers	Chris Scott	Offensive tackle	Tennessee
5	154	Green Bay Packers	Andrew Quarless	Tight end	Penn State
5	155	Arizona Cardinals ^{(from Philadelphia via New York Jets and Pittsburgh)}	John Skelton	Quarterback	Fordham
5	156	Baltimore Ravens	David Reed	Wide receiver	Utah
5	161	Minnesota Vikings	Chris DeGeare	Offensive tackle	Wake Forest
5	165	Atlanta Falcons	Kerry Meier	Wide receiver	Kansas
5	166	Pittsburgh Steelers	Stevenson Sylvester	Linebacker	Utah
5	169	Green Bay Packers	Marshall Newhouse	Offensive tackle	TCU
6	175	Carolina Panthers ^{(from Oakland)}	Greg Hardy	Defensive end	Ole Miss
6	182	San Francisco 49ers	Nate Byham	Tight end	Pittsburgh
6	187	Houston Texans	Shelley Smith	Guard	Colorado State
6	196	Dallas Cowboys	Jamar Wall	Cornerback	Texas Tech
7	212	Miami Dolphins ^{(from Kansas City)}	Chris McCoy	Linebacker	Middle Tennessee
7	213	Detroit Lions ^{(from Seattle)}	Willie Young	Defensive end	North Carolina State
7	216	Buffalo Bills	Kyle Calloway	Offensive tackle	Iowa
7	219	Washington Redskins ^{(from Miami)}	Terrence Austin	Wide receiver	UCLA
7	228	Cincinnati Bengals	Reggie Stephens	Guard	Iowa State
7	240	Indianapolis Colts	Kavell Conner	Linebacker	Clemson
7	242	Pittsburgh Steelers	Doug Worthington	Defensive tackle	Ohio State
