= Quincy Miller =

American basketball player (born 1992)

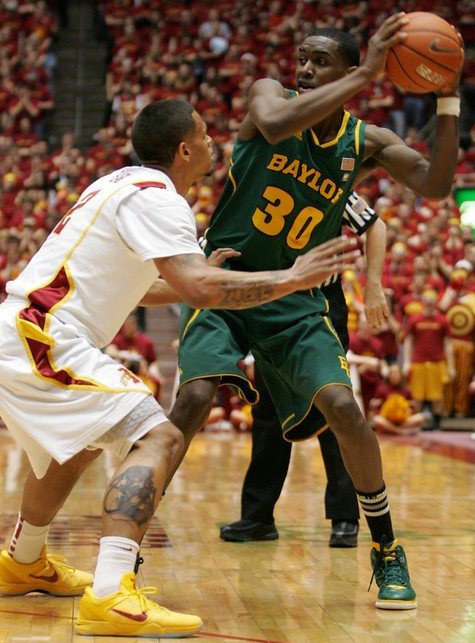
- Miller playing for Baylor in 2012

Free agent
- Position: Power forward

Personal information
- Born: November 18, 1992 (age 33) Chicago, Illinois, U.S.
- Listed height: 6 ft 10 in (2.08 m)
- Listed weight: 235 lb (107 kg)

Career information
- High school: North Chicago (North Chicago, Illinois); Fairmont (Fairmont, North Carolina); Quality Education Academy (Winston-Salem, North Carolina); Westchester (High Point, North Carolina)
- College: Baylor (2011–2012)
- NBA draft: 2012: 2nd round, 38th overall pick
- Drafted by: Denver Nuggets
- Playing career: 2012–present

Career history
- 2012–2014: Denver Nuggets
- 2012–2013: →Iowa Energy
- 2014–2015: Reno Bighorns
- 2015: Sacramento Kings
- 2015: Reno Bighorns
- 2015: Detroit Pistons
- 2015: →Grand Rapids Drive
- 2015–2016: Crvena zvezda
- 2016–2017: Maccabi Tel Aviv
- 2017: Brose Bamberg
- 2020: Taoyuan Pauian Archiland
- 2020–2021: Benfica
- 2021–2022: Nacional
- 2022: Converge FiberXers
- 2023: SeaHorses Mikawa
- 2023: TNT Tropang Giga
- 2023–2024: Toyama Grouses
- 2024: San Miguel Beermen
- 2025: Beirut Club

Career highlights
- All-EuroLeague Second Team (2016); ABA League champion (2016); Serbian League champion (2016); Israeli Cup winner (2017); NBA D-League All-Star (2015); Big 12 All-Rookie team (2012); Jordan Brand Classic All-American (2011)
- Stats at NBA.com
- Stats at Basketball Reference
Medals
Men's basketball
Representing United States
FIBA Americas U18 Championship
Gold medal – first place	2010 San Antonio	Team

Quincy Cortez Miller-Scott (born November 18, 1992) is an American professional basketball player. He played for the Detroit Pistons, Sacramento Kings and Denver Nuggets of the National Basketball Association (NBA), as well as the Reno Bighorns, Iowa Energy and Grand Rapids Drive of the NBA Development League.

He was born in the Chicago metropolitan area and was raised there until the age of 13, at which point he moved to live with an uncle in North Carolina so that he could live a better life. He attended four different high schools, but eventually became one of the top ten high school basketball prospects in the class of 2011. He played for USA Basketball in the 2010 FIBA Americas Under-18 Championship. Early in his senior year, he tore his anterior cruciate ligament (ACL), rendering him incapable of playing the remainder of the season.

He played his true freshman season with the Baylor Bears as a forward for the 2011–12 team. In his freshman season, the team set school records for its best start (17–0), longest winning streak (17) and highest ranking (3/3). Following the 2011–12 Big 12 Conference men's basketball season, he was named the Big 12 co-Freshman of the Year and was recognized as an honorable mention All-Big 12 and a Big 12 All-Star Team selection by the Big 12 coaches. He was named Big 12 Freshman of the Year by Sporting News.

In the NBA, Miller had a modest role for most of his first two seasons. He began to get regular playing time midway through his second season, and in the final weeks of his second season he became an everyday starter due to injury. In 2016, he earned an All-EuroLeague Second Team selection and was a member of the 2015–16 ABA League champion, the 2015–16 Basketball League of Serbia champion and the 2016–17 Israeli Basketball State Cup winner.

== High school career ==
At age 13, his uncle Lamont Taylor from Fairmont, North Carolina took Miller in to get him away from the Chicago street life. He transferred from North Chicago High School and played his freshman season for Fairmont High School (North Carolina) before transferring to Quality Education Academy, where he grew 8 inches (20.3 cm) as a sophomore. Miller was relatively unknown until the 2009 Pangos All-American Camp and the Hoop Jamboree. Miller had begun playing AAU basketball for D-One Sports. Then by July 2009 he was a top 10 class of 2011 prospect by Scout.com and top 25 by PrepStar and had interest from Duke, Wake Forest, Kentucky, Oklahoma, Baylor, Memphis and Kansas. Late in Miller's 2009–10 junior season, he began receiving significant support from the 2010 ESPN HS Mr. Basketball USA voters who moved him into 11th place. At the time, he was competing for Quality Education Academy in Winston-Salem. He led the school to the National Christian Schools Athletic Association title. Following the season he was named a second-team ESPNHIGHSCHOOL.com All-American forward and announced his transfer to Westchester Country Day School of High Point where his close friend Deuce Bello played. At the time, he held offers from Duke and Kentucky. He announced that along with the transfer, he would be changing jersey numbers from 35 to 22.

The following summer SLAM Magazine rated him as the top prospect in the class of 2011 before he appeared at the June 2010 Pangos All-American Camp. After leading his team in rebounding in the camp's "Cream of the Crop" All-Star finale game, Miller earned team MVP honors. In June 2010, Miller was the sixth man for the gold medal-winning team at the FIBA Americas Under-18 Championship. He led the team in rebounding average for the tournament, was second in scoring average, and made the game-winning 3-point shot with 25 seconds remaining in the championship game against Brazil. His 2010 average of 9.2 rebounds per game was tied with Chris Bosh's 2002 average for second in the history of USA Basketball's U18 competition behind only Shareef Abdur-Rahim 1994 10.1 average. Like most elite level high school players, Miller participated on the summer Amateur Athletic Union circuit, including showcase events such as the July NYC Summer Classic.

Based on his play during the high school basketball season, AAU tournaments and national summer camps, experts from ESPN RISE, ESPN College Basketball Recruiting and other talent evaluators selected him to the August 2010 Boost Mobile Elite 24 event. By the time of the event, he was the fourth ranked basketball player in the ESPNU 100. Following his tournament play, ESPN HS began comparisons with him to Kevin Durant. At the event, his pass to Bello during the slam dunk contest appeared on SportsCenter. The following week, he played at the UIC Pavilion in the fourth annual adidas Nations global experience with many of the world's elite high school players. In the September 2010 ScoutsFocus Elite 80 All Star Game in Greensboro, North Carolina, after fans heckled him that his team was trailing, he rattled off 18 consecutive points.

Following in the footsteps of basketball players like LeBron James, Kevin Love, Tyreke Evans and Harrison Barnes, Miller was the 2010–11 high school diary keeper for SLAM Magazine. Once Miller and Bello were united, they were described as arguably the best high school basketball tandem in the country. Entering his senior season, Miller was a first team All-Southeast Region team selection by ESPN HS. At the time he was listed in third in the 2010-2011 Preseason ESPNHS Mr. Basketball USA voting (behind Austin Rivers and Mike Gilchrist). The team was preseason #32 in the POWERADE FAB 50 ESPNHS Boys' basketball team rankings. In December 2010, Miller suffered a torn ACL, ending his senior season, and high school career. As a senior, he was ineligible for the McDonald's All-American Game, but was an honorary All-American selection for the Jordan Brand Classic game. He did not play in the game, but participated in drills. His Jordan Brand workouts refueled Durant comparisons. He was also a first team All-American selection by SLAM Magazine (along with Gilchrist, Rivers, Bradley Beal, Anthony Davis and Marquis Teague).

He was rated as the No. 4 player by Scout.com, the #7 player in the ESPNU 100, and the #7 player by Rivals.com.

== College career ==
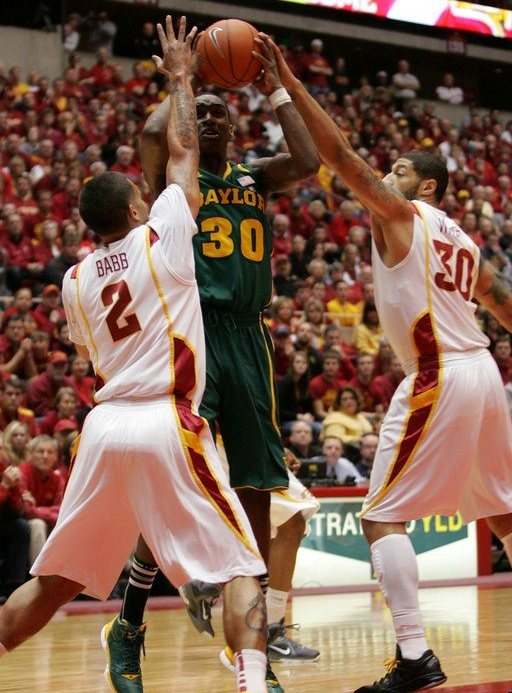
Quincy Miller defended by Iowa State's Chris Babb and Royce White

On October 21, 2010, Miller and Bello jointly announced on ESPNU that they would attend Baylor University. In August 2010, Scout.com had named Miller their number two prospect in the country behind Anthony Davis. At the time of the announcement, Miller was the top-ranked high school class of 2011 power forward in the nation according to Rivals.com and the number two prospect in the nation behind Gilchrist according to PrepStar's Rob Harrington, who had thought he might go to Louisville. In November, Miller and Bello signed their letters of intent. At the time he signed his letter of intent, he was ranked the 2nd best player in the nation by Scout.com and PrepStar, while Rivals.com listed him fifth. In 2011, Big12Sports.com has repeatedly described Miller as a potential Top 10 draft pick. As an incoming freshman for the 2011–12 Bears, he was one of five Big 12 Conference players named to the Naismith College Player of the Year preseason top 50 watchlist. Baylor entered the season without 2011–12 Big 12 Conference basketball season preseason player of the year Perry Jones who was on a five-game suspension for having accepted improper benefits before arriving at Baylor. Nonetheless, Dime Magazine included Miller, Jones and Bello in its list of Top 25 Breakout Players & Teams To Watch In The NBA, College & High School This Season.

In Baylor's first three games, Miller scored 17, 17 and 20 points against Texas Southern on November 11, Jackson State on November 13 and San Diego State on November 15, respectively. The New York Times described his second half contribution against San Diego State as key. His performance in these three games clarified the success of his rehabilitation according to the press. In the fifth game on November 23 against Texas-Arlington, Miller posted his first double-double with 17 points and 11 rebounds. After rolling his ankle in practice, Miller sat out the sixth game. After those first six games with a 15.2 point per game average, Miller was mentioned in discussions about National Freshman of the Year candidates. However, as of 29 December 2011, he had not scored 17 points in a game since Jones' return to the lineup and his own return from injury.

By the end of December 2011, Miller had contributed to the school's first ever 13–0 start and a school-record tying 13-game winning streak. Prior to the 13th victory on December 28, which came over the (15 AP/14 Coaches) Mississippi State Bulldogs, the team (6 AP/7 Coaches) had already reach the highest rankings in school history in the 2011–12 NCAA Division I men's basketball rankings. On January 14, Miller posted 21 points as Baylor (4 AP/4 Coaches) defeated Oklahoma State, raising their record to 17–0. Miller had 17 points when (3 AP/3 Coaches) Baylor suffered its first loss to (7 AP/7 Coaches) Kansas on January 16. He had a career-high 29 points in a January 21, 89–88 loss to (5 AP/5 Coaches) Missouri. On February 18, he posted another double-double with 12 points and 11 rebounds against Kansas State. Following the 2011–12 Big 12 Conference men's basketball season, he was named the Big 12 co-Freshman of the Year (with Le'Bryan Nash) and was recognized as an honorable mention All-Big 12 and a Big 12 All-Rookie Team selection by the league's coaches. Miller was also selected as the Big 12 Freshman of the Year by The Sporting News.

== Professional career ==
=== NBA ===
==== Denver Nuggets (2012–2014) ====
On April 10, 2012, Miller confirmed that he would return to Baylor for his sophomore year of eligibility. However, Miller later decided to forgo his final three years of eligibility and enter the NBA draft. He was selected in the second round of the 2012 NBA draft with the 38th pick overall by the Nuggets. His representative was Dwon Clifton of the Envision Sports Agency. During the 2012 NBA Summer League, Miller averaged 6.8 points and 5.2 rebounds for Denver. Miller made the Nuggets' regular season roster, though he did not play in any games during the preseason.

On November 13, 2012, the Nuggets assigned Miller to the Iowa Energy. In his professional debut, he had 17 points and 8 rebounds on November 24 against the Sioux Falls Skyforce in 27 minutes. In the Energy's third game, first victory and home opener, Miller posted a double-double with 17 points and 12 rebounds on December 1. After three D-League games in which he averaged 14.0 points, 10.7 rebounds and 2.3 assists in 29.0 minutes, the Nuggets recalled Miller on December 2. He made his NBA debut on December 16 against the Sacramento Kings. On December 27, he was reassigned to the Iowa Energy, but he was recalled by the Nuggets on February 13. Overall, he averaged 11.3 points and 6.8 rebounds in 23 games in the D-League.

He again participated in the NBA Summer League for the Nuggets in 2013. Prior to his second season, head coach Brian Shaw described Miller as if he has the potential to be comparable to Paul George. Once the season began, Miller's second year salary became fully guaranteed. On December 27, 2013, Miller scored a career-high 9 points against the New Orleans Pelicans. With Wilson Chandler suffering from a groin injury, Miller made his first NBA career start on January 9, 2014, against the Oklahoma City Thunder with Kevin Durant as his defensive assignment. The game was nationally televised. Miller matched his career high with 9 points, while Durant scored 30, but Denver won 101–88. In his second start in the following game against Orlando on January 11, Miller achieved his first NBA double double with career highs of 16 points and 11 rebounds. Miller again served in the starting lineup on February 10 but this time in the backcourt when point guard Ty Lawson was injured and starting shooting guard Randy Foye shifted over to replace him. In late March, when Wilson Chandler missed several games, Miller moved into the starting lineup. On April 6, Miller, who was still starting in place of Chandler, scored a career-high 19 points in an overtime contest against Houston.

On October 27, 2014, Miller was waived by the Nuggets.

==== Reno Bighorns and Sacramento Kings (2014–2015) ====
After filling paperwork to enter the NBA Development League on December 10, 2014, Miller was acquired by the Reno Bighorns via the D-League player pool on December 12. He was a finalist for NBA D-League Player of the Month that month.

On January 17, 2015, Miller signed a 10-day contract with the Sacramento Kings. On January 30, he signed a second 10-day contract with the Kings. On February 4, 2015, he was named to the Futures All-Star team for the 2015 NBA D-League All-Star Game. Following the expiration of his second 10-day contract, he parted ways with the Kings on February 10 and returned to the Bighorns with the intentions of playing in the D-League All-Star Game.

==== Detroit Pistons (2015) ====
On February 21, 2015, Miller signed a 10-day contract with the Detroit Pistons. On February 27, he was assigned to the Grand Rapids Drive. After being recalled on March 2, he signed a second 10-day contract with the Pistons the following day. On March 12, he signed a two-year, partially guaranteed deal with the Pistons. On March 25, he was reassigned to Grand Rapids, and recalled two days later. Miller managed to appear in just four games for the Pistons to finish the season.

On July 13, 2015, Miller was traded to the Brooklyn Nets in exchange for Steve Blake. On October 20, 2015, he was waived by the Nets after appearing in four preseason games.

=== Overseas ===
==== Crvena zvezda (2015–2016) ====
On October 20, 2015, Miller signed with Serbian team Crvena zvezda for the rest of the 2015–16 season. He was a member of the 2015–16 ABA League champions. He was a 2015–16 EuroLeague All-EuroLeague Second Team selection. He became fan favourite after playing very good basketball, especially in Euroleague. He even became one of "Best foreign players to play for Crvena Zvezda".

==== Maccabi Tel Aviv (2016–2017) ====
On June 13, 2016, Miller signed a two-year contract with the Israeli club Maccabi Tel Aviv, Miller won the 2017 Israeli State Cup with Maccabi.

==== Brose Bamberg (2017) ====
On July 28, 2017, Miller signed a two-year deal with the German club Brose Bamberg. However, on November 20, 2017, he parted ways with Bamberg after appearing in one game.

==== Taoyuan Pauian Archiland (2020) ====
Miller signed with Taoyuan Pauian Archiland of the Super Basketball League and played five games, averaging 15 points and 9.6 rebounds per game, before replaced by Charles García.

==== Benfica (2020–2021) ====
On December 23, 2020, Miller signed with Benfica of the Portuguese Basketball League. Miller averaged 12.3 points, 6 rebounds, and 1.9 assists per game.

==== Nacional (2021–2022) ====
On August 26, 2021, Miller signed with Nacional of the Liga Uruguaya de Básquetbol.

==== Converge FiberXers (2022) ====
In August 2022, he signed with the Converge FiberXers of the Philippine Basketball Association (PBA) as the team's import for the 2022–23 PBA Commissioner's Cup.

==== TNT Tropang Giga (2023) ====
On August 29, 2023, he signed with the TNT Tropang Giga of the Philippine Basketball Association (PBA) as one of the team's import for its participation in the 2023–24 East Asia Super League. He was eventually selected to play as the team's temporary import in place of Rondae Hollis-Jefferson for the first game of the 2023–24 PBA Commissioner's Cup.

== Career statistics ==
Legend
GP	Games played	GS	Games started	MPG	Minutes per game
FG%	Field-goal percentage	3P%	3-point field-goal percentage	FT%	Free-throw percentage
RPG	Rebounds per game	APG	Assists per game	SPG	Steals per game
BPG	Blocks per game	PPG	Points per game	PIR	Performance index rating
**Bold**	Career high

=== NBA ===
==== Regular season ====
Year	Team	GP	GS	MPG	FG%	3P%	FT%	RPG	APG	SPG	BPG	PPG
2012–13	Denver	7	0	12.3	.333	**1.000**	.571	2.3	.4	1.1	.0	3.6
2013–14	Denver	**52**	**16**	**15.2**	**.367**	.319	.709	**2.8**	.5	.4	**.6**	4.9
2014–15	Sacramento	6	0	10.2	.222	.143	**.727**	2.0	.5	**1.0**	.5	2.8
2014–15	Detroit	4	0	14.5	.250	.182	.000	2.0	**1.3**	.3	.5	**5.0**
Career		69	16	13.5	.350	.292	.706	2.4	.5	.4	.5	5.3

=== EuroLeague ===
Year	Team	GP	GS	MPG	FG%	3P%	FT%	RPG	APG	SPG	BPG	PPG	PIR
2015–16	Crvena zvezda	**24**	**22**	**29.1**	**.596**	.327	.778	**5.7**	**.9**	**.9**	**1.5**	**14.1**	**14.8**
2016–17	Maccabi	4	3	19.3	.333	**.364**	**1.000**	3.3	.8	.5	.8	7.0	4.5
Career		28	25	27.7	.463	.331	.788	5.7	.9	.9	1.5	13.1	13.3

== Personal life ==
Miller's older sister Keisha was killed in a car accident in 2005 at the age of 17, which inspired his jersey number change. Three additional close family members died in the three years prior to his 2011 ACL rehab. His mother is a nurse and he has 14 siblings. At Baylor, he served as Julius Randle's host for his visit.
