= Hunter Lawrence =

Hunter Lawrence may refer to:

- Hunter Lawrence (American football) (born 1988), American football placekicker
- Hunter Lawrence (motorcyclist) (born 1999), Australian motocross rider
