= Westchester Academy =

Westchester Academy may refer to:

- Westchester Country Day School, formerly known as Westchester Academy, located in High Point, North Carolina, United States
- Westchester Academy for International Studies, located in Houston, Texas, United States
