= John S. Matijevich =

American politician

John S. Matijevich (December 25, 1927 – November 3, 2016) was an American politician.

Matijevich was born in North Chicago, Illinois. He served in the United States Army. Matijevich received his bachelor's degree from Lake Forest College. He served as the police chief for the village of North Chicago and wrote columns for the North Chicago Tribune, the Lake County Journal, and for the Bob Schroeder Publishing Company. Matijevich served in the Illinois House of Representatives from 1967 to 1992 and was a Democrat. He died at his home in North Chicago, Illinois.
