= O'Brien Schofield =

American football player (born 1987)

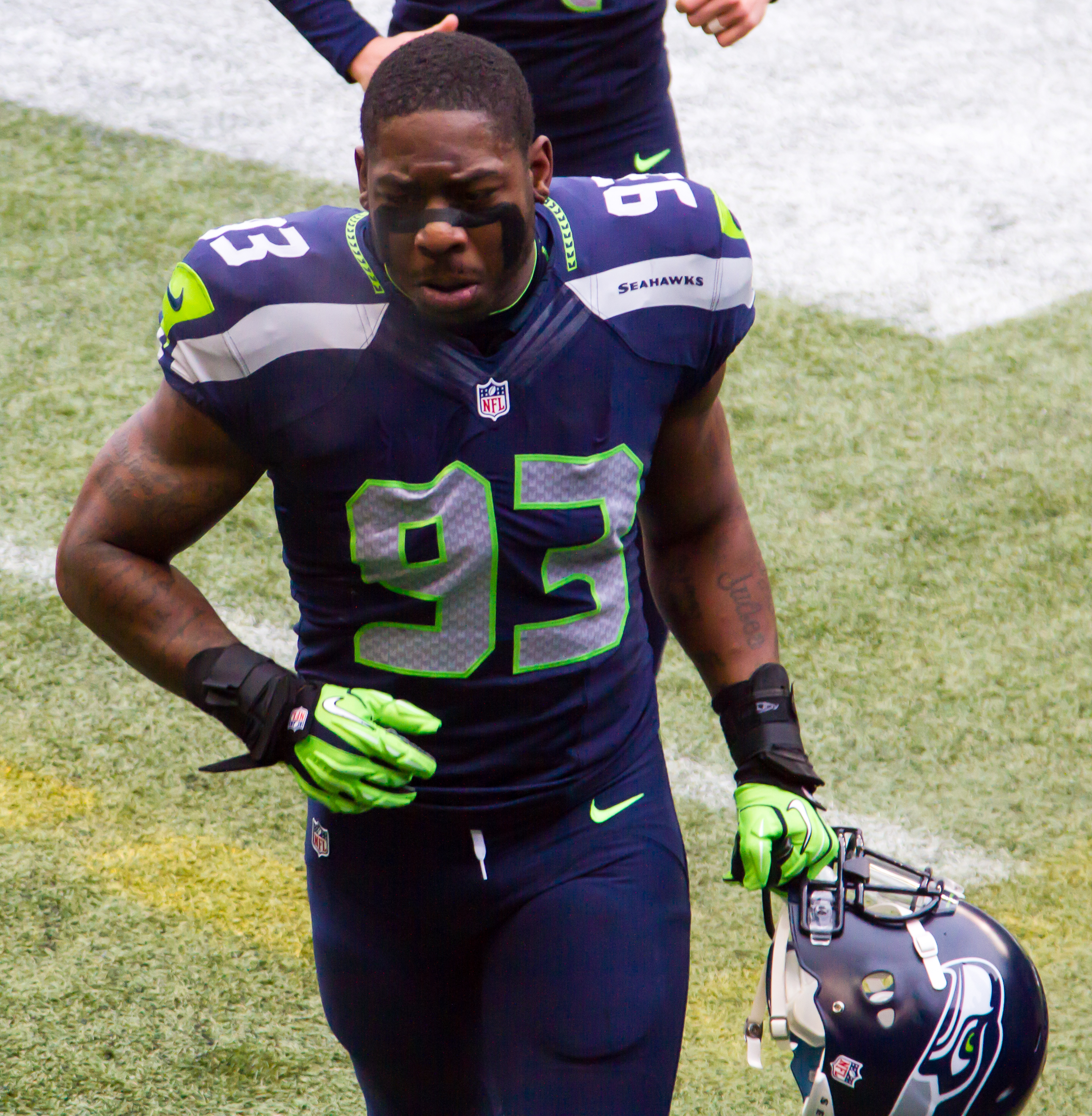
- Schofield with the Seattle Seahawks in 2013

No. 50, 54, 93
- Position: Linebacker

Personal information
- Born: April 3, 1987 (age 39); Camden, South Carolina, U.S.
- Listed height: 6 ft 3 in (1.91 m)
- Listed weight: 242 lb (110 kg)

Career information
- High school: North Chicago Community (North Chicago, Illinois)
- College: Wisconsin (2005–2009)
- NFL draft: 2010: 4th round, 130th overall pick

Career history
- Arizona Cardinals (2010−2012); Seattle Seahawks (2013–2014); Atlanta Falcons (2015−2016)

Awards and highlights
- Super Bowl champion (XLVIII); Second-team All-American (2009); First-team All-Big Ten (2009); 2010 East–West Shrine Game Defensive MVP

Career NFL statistics
- Total tackles: 141
- Sacks: 15.5
- Forced fumbles: 5
- Fumble recoveries: 2
- Stats at Pro Football Reference

Alacce O'Brien Schofield (born April 3, 1987) is an American former professional football player who was a linebacker in the National Football League (NFL). He was selected by the Arizona Cardinals in the fourth round of the 2010 NFL draft and played for them for three seasons. He was also a member of the Seattle Seahawks during their Super Bowl XLVIII championship season and the Atlanta Falcons. He played college football for the Wisconsin Badgers.

As a fifth year redshirt senior defensive end for the 2009 Wisconsin Badgers he ranked second in the nation in tackles for a loss (TFLs) and second in the Big Ten Conference in quarterback sacks. For the 2009 NCAA Division I FBS football season, he earned several second-team and honorable mention All-American recognitions by various publications. He was a first-team 2009 All-Big Ten Conference selection. He earned the defensive MVP award at the 2010 East–West Shrine Game, but was injured during practice for the 2010 Senior Bowl the subsequent week.

== Early life ==
Schofield attended North Chicago Community High School. In high school, Schofield was a Lake County, Illinois 2003 All-county second-team selection and 2004 first-team selection in football. He was also a special mention All-state selection in 2004. In basketball, he was an All-county honorable mention for 2004–05. In high school, he played wide receiver as a sophomore, defensive end as a junior and end, linebacker, receiver, fullback, placekicker, kick returner and punt returner as a senior. He also ran track. Scout.com rated him as the 55th best high school football linebacker in the country. Rivals.com ranked him as the 24th best defensive end in the country and the 24th best football prospect in Illinois.

College recruiting
Name	Hometown	School	Height	Weight	40^{‡}	Commit date
O'Brien Schofield; DE	Great Lakes, Illinois	North Chicago (IL)	6 ft 3 in (1.91 m)	218 lb (99 kg)	4.66	Jan 28, 2005
O'Brien Schofield; DE	Recruit ratings: Scout: Rivals:					
Overall recruit ranking: Scout: 55 (LB) Rivals: 24 Weakside (DE)
‡ Refers to 40-yard dash; Note: In many cases, Scout, Rivals, 247Sports, On3, and ESPN may conflict in their listings of height, weight and 40 time.; In these cases, the average was taken. ESPN grades are on a 100-point scale.; Sources: "Wisconsin Football Commitment List 2005". Rivals.; "Wisconsin Football Recruiting Commits 2005". Scout.; "Scout.com Team Recruiting Rankings". Scout.; "2005 Team Ranking". Rivals.com.

== College career ==
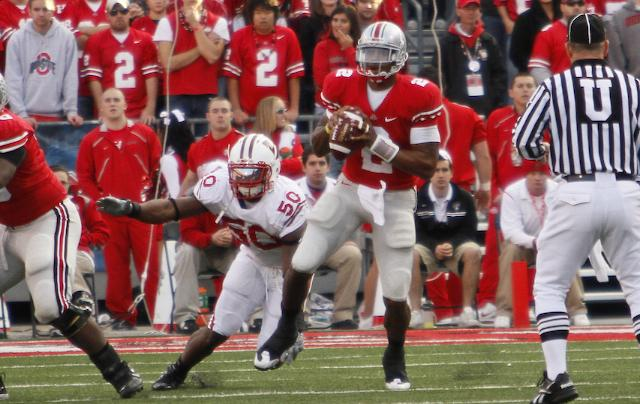
Schofield (No. 50) chases Terrelle Pryor

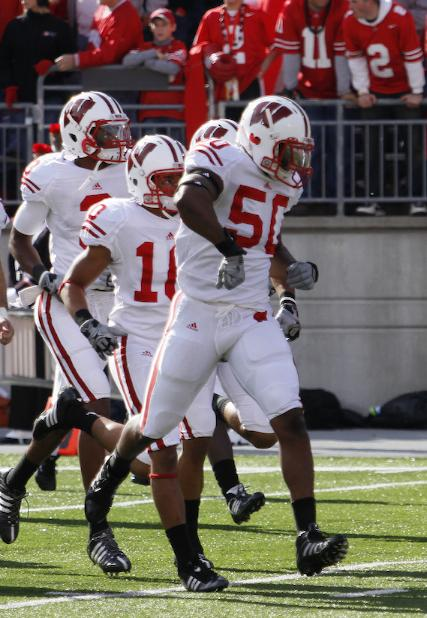
Schofield leads the 2009 Wisconsin Badgers football team onto the field.

Schofield did not appear in any games for the 2005 Badgers and recorded no statistics although he appeared in five games for the 2006 Badgers. He recorded his first tackle on September 15 for the 2007 Badgers against The Citadel Bulldogs and his first sack and TFL on August 30 for the 2008 team against the Akron Zips. He concluded his career with a total of 17 sacks and 33 TFLs. He also accumulated 4 forced fumbles. On June 7, 2007, 20-year-old Schofield lost his 19-year-old brother, Joshua, who drowned on a beach in Zion, IL.

He was the 2009 Big Ten Conference runner-up in sacks with 12 to Ryan Kerrigan and runner-up in TFLs with 24.5 to Brandon Graham. He ranked second in the nation in TFLs/game. At the conclusion of the 2009 Big Ten Conference football season he was a 2009 First-team All-Big Ten selection by the coaches and media.

He concluded his career for Wisconsin Badgers football with the 2009 team in the December 29, 2009 Champs Sports Bowl. For the 2009 NCAA Division I FBS football season, he was a second-team All-American selection by Scout.com and an honorable mention by College Football News, Sports Illustrated, and Pro Football Weekly. During the season, he was the October 4, 2009, Big Ten Defensive Player of the Week for his performance of October 3 against the Minnesota Golden Gophers. He was selected as a midseason semifinalists for the Bednarik Award.

The January 23, 2010, East–West Shrine Game, in which he earned defensive MVP, was his last game. He recorded an interception on a Max Hall pass and made three solo tackles in the game. Schofield was projected to play linebacker in the NFL. During the week of practice at the Shrine Game, he performed with the linebackers in order to demonstrate his NFL potential for scouts. However, in the subsequent week of practice for the January 30, 2010, Senior Bowl, Schofield tore his anterior cruciate ligament.

== Professional career ==
Pre-draft measurables
Height	Weight	Arm length	Hand span
6 ft 2 1/4 in (1.89 m)	221 lb (100 kg)	32 3/8 in (0.82 m)	9 1/2 in (0.24 m)
All values from NFL Combine

=== Arizona Cardinals ===
Schofield was selected in the fourth round of the 2010 NFL draft, 130th overall, by the Arizona Cardinals. Since Schofield was injured, he was considered a good value because his talent level was near first round draft choice level. He was expected to begin the 2010 NFL season on the physically unable to perform list but return late in the year as an outside linebacker. Although he played on the defensive line in college, he was projected to play outside linebacker for the Cardinals who had Joey Porter and Will Davis on their roster. Schofield signed a 4-year contract on July 27, 2010. On August 31, he was placed on the reserve/non-football injury list.

He made his NFL debut on October 31, 2010, in Week 8, against the Tampa Bay Buccaneers. Schofield forced a fumble against the Minnesota Vikings on November 7 on kick coverage that was recovered for a touchdown. Schofield recorded his first NFL sack on December 25, 2010, when he sacked QB Stephen McGee for an 11-yard loss in a 27-26 Arizona win over the Dallas Cowboys. In the Cardinals January 2, 2011, regular season finale against the San Francisco 49ers, Schofield sacked QB Alex Smith for a 5-yard loss.

He had his first two-sack game on December 18, 2011, against Seneca Wallace on back-to-back fourth quarter plays of an overtime victory over the Cleveland Browns. He became a starter during the 2012 NFL season.

On July 25, 2013, he was released by the Arizona Cardinals.

=== Seattle Seahawks ===
On July 27, 2013, Schofield was claimed off waivers by the Seattle Seahawks. He posted a sack of Cam Newton in his debut with the 2013 Seahawks against the Carolina Panthers. After helping the Seahawks win Super Bowl XLVIII, he became a free agent. On March 11, 2014, Schofield and the New York Giants agreed on a two-year, $8 million contract. However, the deal was called off due to a problem with his physical. He re-signed with the Seahawks on May 2.

=== Atlanta Falcons ===
On March 12, 2015, Schofield signed with the Atlanta Falcons. After the 2015 season, Schofield became a free agent. On September 21, 2016, Schofield rejoined the Atlanta Falcons after agreeing to a one-year contract. He was released by the Falcons on October 4.

== NFL career statistics ==
Legend
**Bold**	Career high

=== Regular season ===
Year	Team	Games		Tackles					Interceptions					Fumbles			
Year	Team	GP	GS	Cmb	Solo	Ast	Sck	TFL	Int	Yds	TD	Lng	PD	FF	FR	Yds	TD
2010	ARI	10	0	12	12	0	2.0	3	0	0	0	0	**1**	1	**1**	0	0
2011	ARI	**16**	0	**37**	**33**	4	**4.5**	3	0	0	0	0	0	**2**	0	0	0
2012	ARI	9	9	34	26	**8**	4.0	**6**	0	0	0	0	0	0	0	0	0
2013	SEA	15	2	8	7	1	1.0	3	0	0	0	0	0	0	0	0	0
2014	SEA	**16**	0	20	15	5	2.0	2	0	0	0	0	0	1	**1**	0	0
2015	ATL	**16**	**10**	30	24	6	2.0	4	0	0	0	0	0	1	0	0	0
2016	ATL	2	0	0	0	0	0.0	0	0	0	0	0	0	0	0	0	0
		84	21	141	117	24	15.5	21	0	0	0	0	1	5	2	0	0

=== Playoffs ===
Year	Team	Games		Tackles					Interceptions					Fumbles			
Year	Team	GP	GS	Cmb	Solo	Ast	Sck	TFL	Int	Yds	TD	Lng	PD	FF	FR	Yds	TD
2013	SEA	2	0	1	1	0	0.0	**1**	0	0	0	0	0	0	0	0	0
2014	SEA	**3**	0	**5**	**3**	**2**	0.0	0	0	0	0	0	0	**1**	0	0	0
		5	0	6	4	2	0.0	1	0	0	0	0	0	1	0	0	0

== Personal life ==
Schofield is the eldest of five children of Anthony and Dawn Schofield. Schofield's younger brother, Admiral, played basketball at the University of Tennessee and was drafted 42nd overall in the 2019 NBA draft by the Philadelphia 76ers and later traded to the Washington Wizards. His uncle Andre Carter played safety at Clemson. Schofield is a cousin of both Vonnie Holliday and Bobby Engram who both have had long National Football League careers.
