= North Chicago, Illinois =

City in the United States

- City
- City of North Chicago
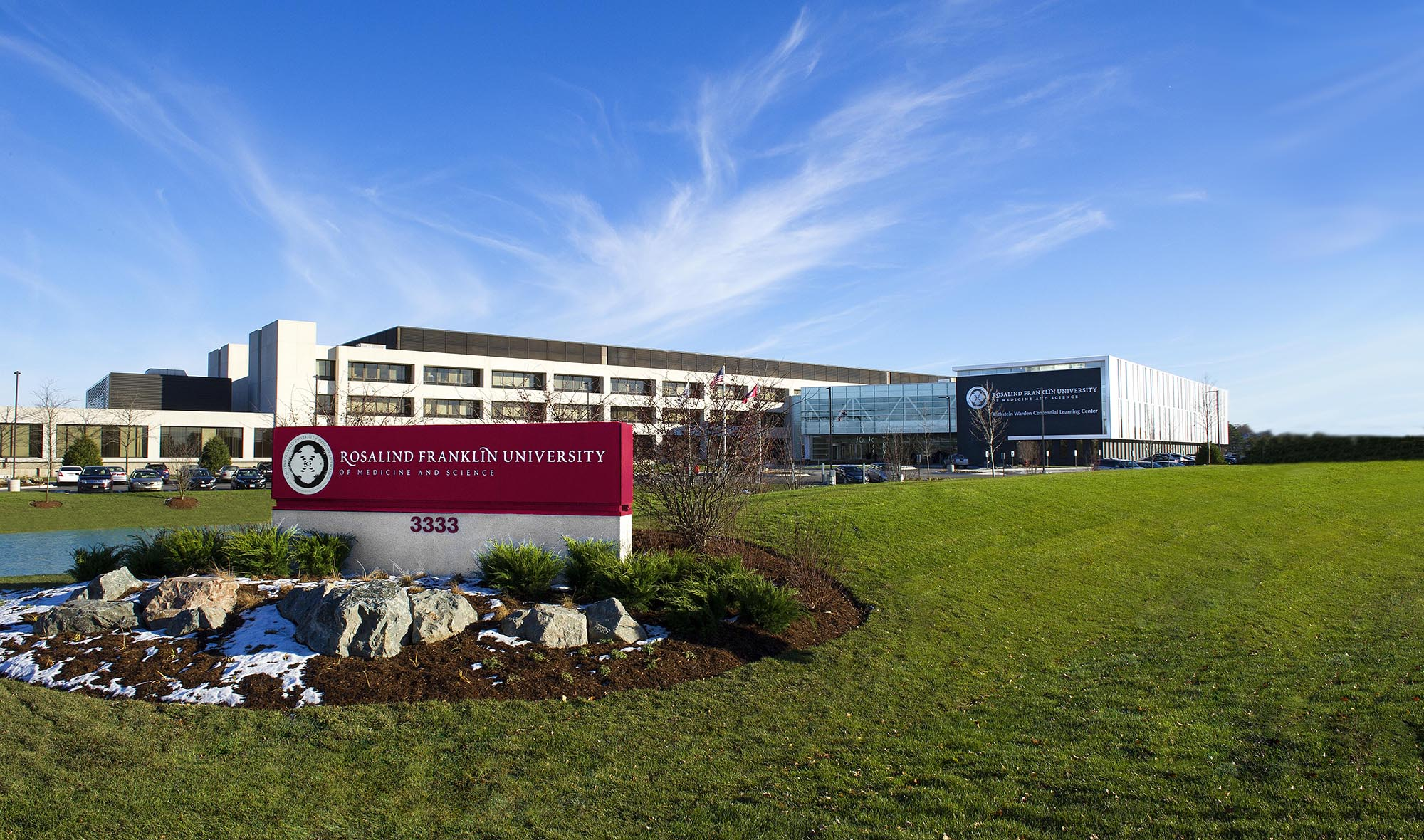
- Rosalind Franklin University of Medicine and Science

- Logo
- Motto: "History. Harmony. Home."
- Interactive map of North Chicago, Illinois
- Location within Chicago metropolitan area Location within Illinois Location within the United States
- Coordinates: 42°18′40″N 87°52′16″W
- Country: United States
- State: Illinois
- County: Lake
- Townships: Shields, Waukegan, Libertyville

Government
  - Mayor: Leon Rockingham Jr.

Area
  - Total: 8.02 sq mi (20.76 km^{2})
  - Land: 8.00 sq mi (20.71 km^{2})
  - Water: 0.019 sq mi (0.05 km^{2})
- Elevation: 692 ft (211 m)

Population (2020)
  - Total: 30,759
  - Density: 3,847.1/sq mi (1,485.38/km^{2})
- Time zone: UTC−6 (CST)
  - Summer (DST): UTC−5 (CDT)
- ZIP Code(s): 60064, 60086, 60088
- Area code: 847
- FIPS code: 17-53559
- GNIS feature ID: 2395253
- Website: northchicago.org

North Chicago is a city in Lake County, Illinois, United States, and a suburb of the Chicago metropolitan area. The population was 30,759 at the 2020 census making it the third-most populous city by population in the county, after Waukegan and Mundelein.

An industrial center, North Chicago is home to the Great Lakes Naval Training Center and Great Lakes Barracks Military housing. The city is also home to Rosalind Franklin University of Medicine and Science, which houses the Chicago Medical School.

== History ==
Land speculators moved into the area south of what is now the city of Waukegan in the 1890s. Industrial development began almost immediately with a railroad depot being set up in 1892; most notable was the arrival of the Washburn and Moen Manufacturing Company, a major barbed wire maker.

The settlement was incorporated as a village in 1895 and as a city in 1909. In 1911, a naval training area was created, the present Great Lakes Naval Training Center, currently the only "boot camp" for Navy enlisted personnel after the closure of facilities in Florida, California, and Houston, MS.

A Veteran's Administration hospital went into service in 1926. This facility was also threatened with closure in recent years but has been retained on condition of a merger with the Naval Hospital.

Historically, North Chicago was known for large populations of Eastern European immigrants. With the onset of the "Great Migration", large numbers of African Americans arrived in the city from states such as Arkansas and Alabama, and toward the end of the 20th century, became the best known demographic group. Housing was segregated in the mid-20th century, and until as late as 1957 the African-American section of town lacked sewers and paved roads. Latinos have arrived in significant numbers, particularly from Mexico, and now form the largest racial/ethnic group in the city (36% as of 2020), just as they do in Waukegan to the north (60% in 2020). North Chicago may have over time been the most diverse and multicultural municipality in Lake County.

Companies such as Washburn and Moen played a significant role in dividing North Chicago based on ethnicity. Workers were relocated from the Worcester plant, and later on, Swedes, Finns, and other Eastern Europeans were brought in. In the northern part of North Chicago, Slovaks, who referred to the area as "Kompanija", founded the Mother of God Roman Catholic Church. Moving further south, Polish residents established Holy Rosary Catholic Church, while German and Irish residents set up schools and churches in the area.

At one time, Navy personnel were a major part of the scene in North Chicago, both the "swabbies" (enlisted men) and the officers. Now, with the degeneration of "the Strip", or entertainment district along several blocks of Sheridan Road, sailors are rarely seen north of the railroad trestle. In the fall of 2007, the city finished demolishing the buildings on Sheridan Road between Martin Luther King Drive and the railroad trestle to the north, within the framework of a new development project involving tax increment financing.

A number of movies have been filmed on the Illinois Route 137 highway through North Chicago including Groundhog Day.

== Geography ==
According to the 2021 census gazetteer files, North Chicago has a total area of 8.02 square miles (20.77 km^{2}), of which 8.00 square miles (20.72 km^{2}) (or 99.75%) is land and 0.02 square miles (0.05 km^{2}) (or 0.25%) is water.

The city is situated on Lake Michigan, immediately to the south of Waukegan. Most of its territory drains directly to the lake, but the western region drains to the North Branch of the Chicago River, and ultimately, since the engineering projects of the 19th century, to the Illinois and thence to the Mississippi River and the Gulf of Mexico.

North Chicago includes a Lake County Forest Preserve unit, the Greenbelt Cultural Center and Forest Preserve. The City of North Chicago includes a beach within its limits called Foss Park Beach, which is owned and maintained by the Foss Park District, which is named after Former Congressman George Edmund Foss.

== Demographics ==
Historical population
Census	Pop.	Note	%±
1900	1,150		—
1910	3,306		187.5%
1920	5,839		76.6%
1930	8,466		45.0%
1940	8,465		0.0%
1950	8,628		1.9%
1960	22,938		165.9%
1970	47,275		106.1%
1980	38,774		−18.0%
1990	34,978		−9.8%
2000	35,918		2.7%
2010	32,574		−9.3%
2020	30,759		−5.6%
U.S. Decennial Census; 2010 2020

=== Racial and ethnic composition ===
North Chicago city, Illinois – Racial and ethnic composition Note: the US Census treats Hispanic/Latino as an ethnic category. This table excludes Latinos from the racial categories and assigns them to a separate category. Hispanics/Latinos may be of any race.
Race / Ethnicity (NH = Non-Hispanic)	Pop 2000	Pop 2010	Pop 2020	% 2000	% 2010	% 2020
White alone (NH)	14,028	11,838	8,149	39.06%	36.34%	26.49%
Black or African American alone (NH)	12,853	9,469	8,274	35.78%	29.07%	26.90%
Native American or Alaska Native alone (NH)	230	120	94	0.64%	0.37%	0.31%
Asian alone (NH)	1,268	1,190	1,710	3.53%	3.65%	5.56%
Native Hawaiian or Pacific Islander alone (NH)	49	39	104	0.14%	0.12%	0.34%
Other race alone (NH)	91	117	239	0.25%	0.36%	0.78%
Mixed race or Multiracial (NH)	847	944	1,042	2.36%	2.90%	3.39%
Hispanic or Latino (any race)	6,552	8,857	11,147	18.24%	27.19%	36.24%
Total	35,918	32,574	30,759	100.00%	100.00%	100.00%

=== 2020 census ===
As of the 2020 census, North Chicago had a population of 30,759. The population density was 3,837.68 inhabitants per square mile (1,481.74/km^{2}). The median age was 23.4 years. 18.1% of residents were under the age of 18 and 6.1% of residents were 65 years of age or older. For every 100 females there were 148.9 males, and for every 100 females age 18 and over there were 163.7 males age 18 and over.

100.0% of residents lived in urban areas, while 0.0% lived in rural areas.

There were 6,834 households and 4,413 families in North Chicago; 39.1% of households had children under the age of 18 living in them. Of all households, 35.5% were married-couple households, 24.2% were households with a male householder and no spouse or partner present, and 33.2% were households with a female householder and no spouse or partner present. About 29.0% of all households were made up of individuals and 8.5% had someone living alone who was 65 years of age or older.

There were 7,897 housing units, of which 13.5% were vacant. The homeowner vacancy rate was 1.5% and the rental vacancy rate was 8.9%.

Racial composition as of the 2020 census
Race	Number	Percent
White	10,572	34.4%
Black or African American	8,507	27.7%
American Indian and Alaska Native	389	1.3%
Asian	1,733	5.6%
Native Hawaiian and Other Pacific Islander	112	0.4%
Some other race	6,210	20.2%
Two or more races	3,236	10.5%
Hispanic or Latino (of any race)	11,147	36.2%

North Chicago census figures include the Great Lakes Naval Training Center.

== Government ==
The City of North Chicago is a home rule municipality governed by a Mayor and a seven-member City Council. The Mayor and Aldermen are elected to four-year terms with no limit on the number of terms they may serve. Additionally, the City elects a City Clerk and a City Treasurer, both of whom also serve four-year, indefinite terms.

=== Current Officials of North Chicago ===
Title	Name	District	Party	Took Office
Mayor	Leon Rockingham	At- Large	Democratic	2005
City Clerk	Lori L Collins	At- Large	Democratic	2001
Treasurer	Vance D. Wyatt	At- Large	Democratic	2021
Alderman	Michael R. Jackson	1	Democratic	2020
Alderman	Anthony D. Coleman	2	Democratic	2023
Alderman	Carl E Evans	3	Democratic	2013
Alderman	Bobby Allen	4	Democratic	2009
Alderman	Tabitha Wray	5	Democratic	2025
Alderman	Dona C Murphy	6	Democratic	2021
Alderman	Dante Brooks	7	Democratic	2025

=== Mayors of North Chicago ===
Mayors of North Chicago, Illinois

Image	Mayor	Years	Notes
	R. Morrow	1895–	First president after incorporation as a village
	Earl P. Sedgwick	1901–	
	John Sherwin	1905–	First mayor after incorporation as a city
	?		
	Louis B. Jolley	1915–1916	
	?		
	Edward C. Mead	1920–1921	Known as the "Boy Mayor" for his young appearance
	Henry M. Deacon	1921–1925	Re-elected in 1923
	Walter L. Atkinson	1925–1935	Did not seek reelection in 1935.
	John P. Dromey	1935–	
	?		
	Anton Macrowski	1949–	
	?		
	Charles F. Hebior	1961–1965; 1965–1969	
	Leo Kukla	1970 – January 1, 1983	Resigned January 1, 1983 due to health reasons
	Bobby Thompson	January 1, 1983 – April 1985; April 1985 – April 1997	Acting Mayor after resignation of Kukla; Elected by the Alderman to complete the remaining term of Kukla Running through April 1985; First African-American mayor of North Chicago; Won re-election in April 1985; Did not run for reelection in April 1997
	Jerry Johnson	1997–2001	
	Bette Thomas	2001–2005	First African-American female mayor of North Chicago
	Leon Rockingham Jr.	2005–Present	

== Education ==
North Chicago Community Unit School District 187 operates public schools. North Chicago High School is the city's high school.

== Transportation ==
Two Metra stations provide commuter rail service to North Chicago along the Union Pacific North Line, the North Chicago station and the Great Lakes station. Trains serving these stations travel south to Ogilvie Transportation Center in Chicago, and north to Kenosha. Additionally, Pace provides bus service on multiple routes connecting North Chicago to Waukegan and other destinations.

=== Major streets ===
- Tri-State Tollway
- Skokie Highway
- Waukegan Road
- Green Bay Road
- Sheridan Road
- Buckley Road

== Notable people ==
- Tiffany Brooks, HGTV television personality, winner Design Star, Season 8, attended North Chicago Community High School
- Douglas B. Green, country musician and guitarist of Riders In The Sky, born in North Chicago.
- John S. Matijevich, Illinois state representative, was born in North Chicago
- Quincy Miller, college basketball player
- O'Brien Schofield, football Wisconsin Badgers, NFL player
- Tyrone Smith, Olympic long jumper, attended North Chicago Community High School
- Michael Turner, American football, San Diego Chargers, Atlanta Falcons, attended North Chicago Community High School

== Sources ==
- North Chicago, by Charles M. Leeks and Mary L. Robinson, in: Local Community Fact Book : Chicago Metropolitan Area (1990). Chicago : The Chicago Fact Book Consortium, Dept of Sociology, University of Illinois at Chicago, c1995.
- North Chicago, IL, by Wallace Best, in: The Encyclopedia of Chicago. Chicago : University of Chicago Press, c2004.irac
