= Michael Turner (American football) =

American football player (born 1982)

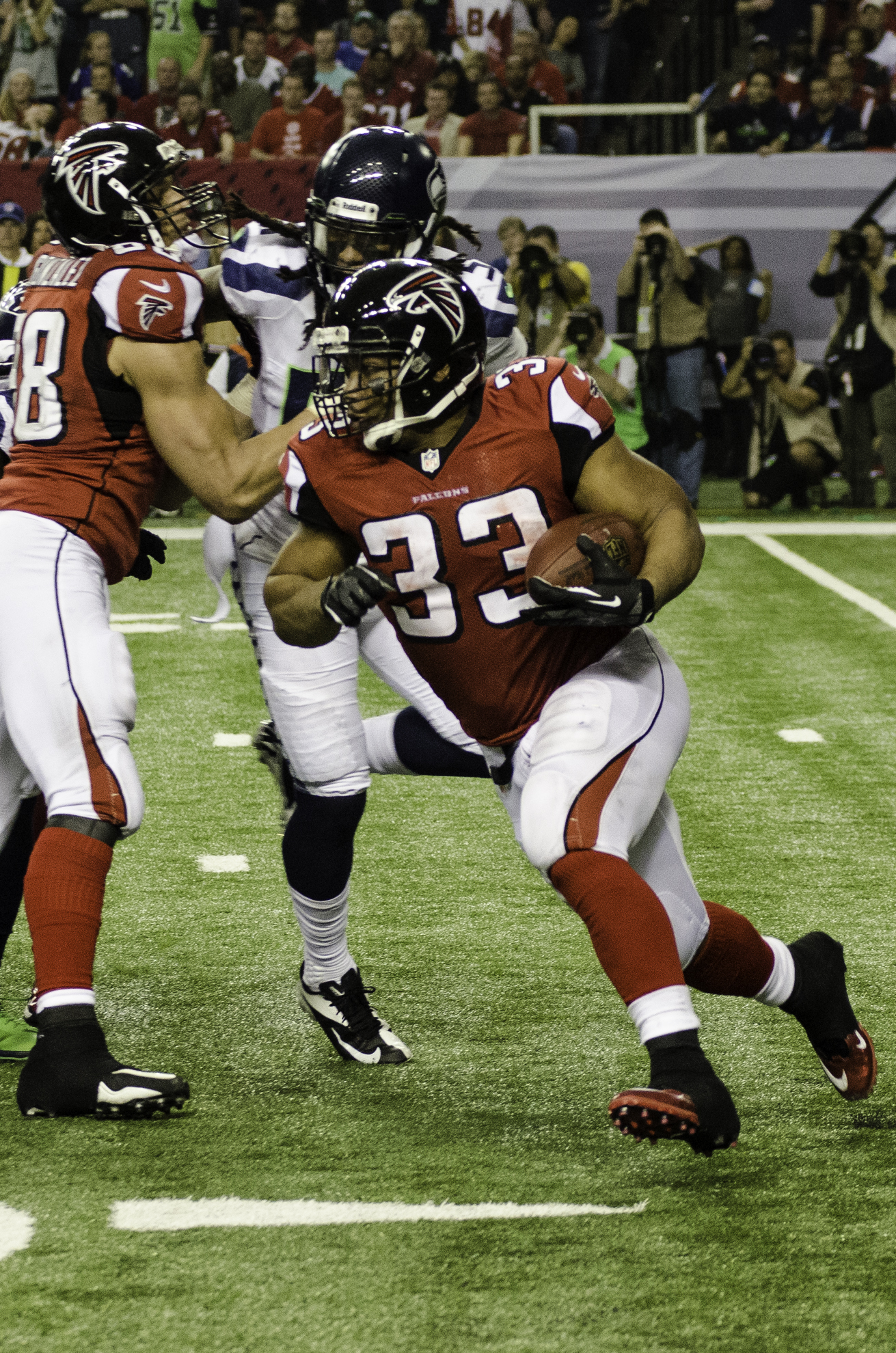
- Turner with the Atlanta Falcons in 2013

No. 33
- Position: Running back

Personal information
- Born: February 13, 1982 (age 44); North Chicago, Illinois, U.S.
- Listed height: 5 ft 10 in (1.78 m)
- Listed weight: 247 lb (112 kg)

Career information
- High school: North Chicago
- College: Northern Illinois (2000–2003)
- NFL draft: 2004: 5th round, 154th overall pick

Career history
- San Diego Chargers (2004–2007); Atlanta Falcons (2008–2012)

Awards and highlights
- First-team All-Pro (2008); Second-team All-Pro (2010); 2× Pro Bowl (2008, 2010); Second-team All-American (2003); First-team All-MAC (2002)

Career NFL statistics
- Rushing yards: 7,338
- Rushing average: 4.5
- Rushing touchdowns: 66
- Receptions: 70
- Receiving yards: 528
- Receiving touchdowns: 1
- Stats at Pro Football Reference

Michael Turner (born February 13, 1982) is an American former professional football player who was a running back in the National Football League (NFL). He played college football for the Northern Illinois Huskies, earning second-team All-American honors in 2003. He was selected by the San Diego Chargers in the fifth round of the 2004 NFL draft, and also played in the NFL for the Atlanta Falcons. He was a two-time All-Pro and a two-time Pro Bowl selection with the Falcons.

== Early life ==
Turner attended and played football at North Chicago Community High School in North Chicago, Illinois. In 1999, he led his team to a 6–4 mark and the first playoff bid in 8 years by rushing for 1,392 yards and 14 touchdowns (10.5 average). His biggest game was for 295 yards on 19 carries including touchdown runs of 67 and school-record 90 yards in a win over Zion-Benton. He was named the Offensive Player of the Year and was a unanimous first-team All-North Suburban Conference player. He finished his high school career with 2,732 rushing yards and 26 total touchdowns. Turner also lettered in track & field at North Chicago, where he was a sectional 100-meter dash champion with a time of 11.15 seconds.

== College career ==
He attended Northern Illinois University and played football for the Huskies. As a junior, he finished second in the nation with 1,915 yards, including five 200+ yd games and two games with five touchdowns. In 2003, he finished second in the NCAA in rushing, behind his future NFL teammate Darren Sproles, with 1,648 yards. He left NIU with the school records for rushing yards (4,941), touchdowns (43) and all-purpose yards (5,392). Since his departure from NIU, two records (rushing yards and touchdowns) have been broken by Garrett Wolfe.

== Professional career ==
Pre-draft measurables
Height	Weight	Arm length	Hand span	40-yard dash	10-yard split	20-yard split	20-yard shuttle	Three-cone drill	Vertical jump	Broad jump	Bench press
5 ft 10 1/2 in (1.79 m)	237 lb (108 kg)	29 3/8 in (0.75 m)	9 5/8 in (0.24 m)	4.50 s	1.56 s	2.61 s	4.15 s	7.50 s	31 in (0.79 m)	9 ft 6 in (2.90 m)	22 reps
All values from NFL Combine

=== San Diego Chargers ===
Turner was selected by the Chargers in the fifth round (154th overall) of the 2004 NFL draft. As a rookie, Turner played mostly on special teams, but started and ran for 87 yards in the regular-season finale against the Kansas City Chiefs.

Turner had again spent most of 2005 on the bench as backup to Pro Bowl starter LaDainian Tomlinson. In the December 18 game against the undefeated Indianapolis Colts, Turner came off the bench to run for 113 yards, including a game-clinching 83-yard touchdown.

During the 2007 off season, Chargers' General Manager A. J. Smith stated that the Chargers would be willing to trade Turner in exchange for both a first and third round draft pick. However, a day after 2007 NFL draft concluded, A. J. Smith stated that Michael Turner would remain a Charger for the 2007 season. He would no longer be accepting trade offers from other NFL teams for Turner.

On April 26, 2007, Turner signed the $2.35 million, one-year tender he received from the Chargers after becoming a restricted free agent.

On January 13, 2008, Turner gained attention when he filled in ably for the Chargers' injured starter Tomlinson early in an AFC Divisional playoff game against the Indianapolis Colts, gaining 71 yards on 17 carries, including several key runs.

=== Atlanta Falcons ===
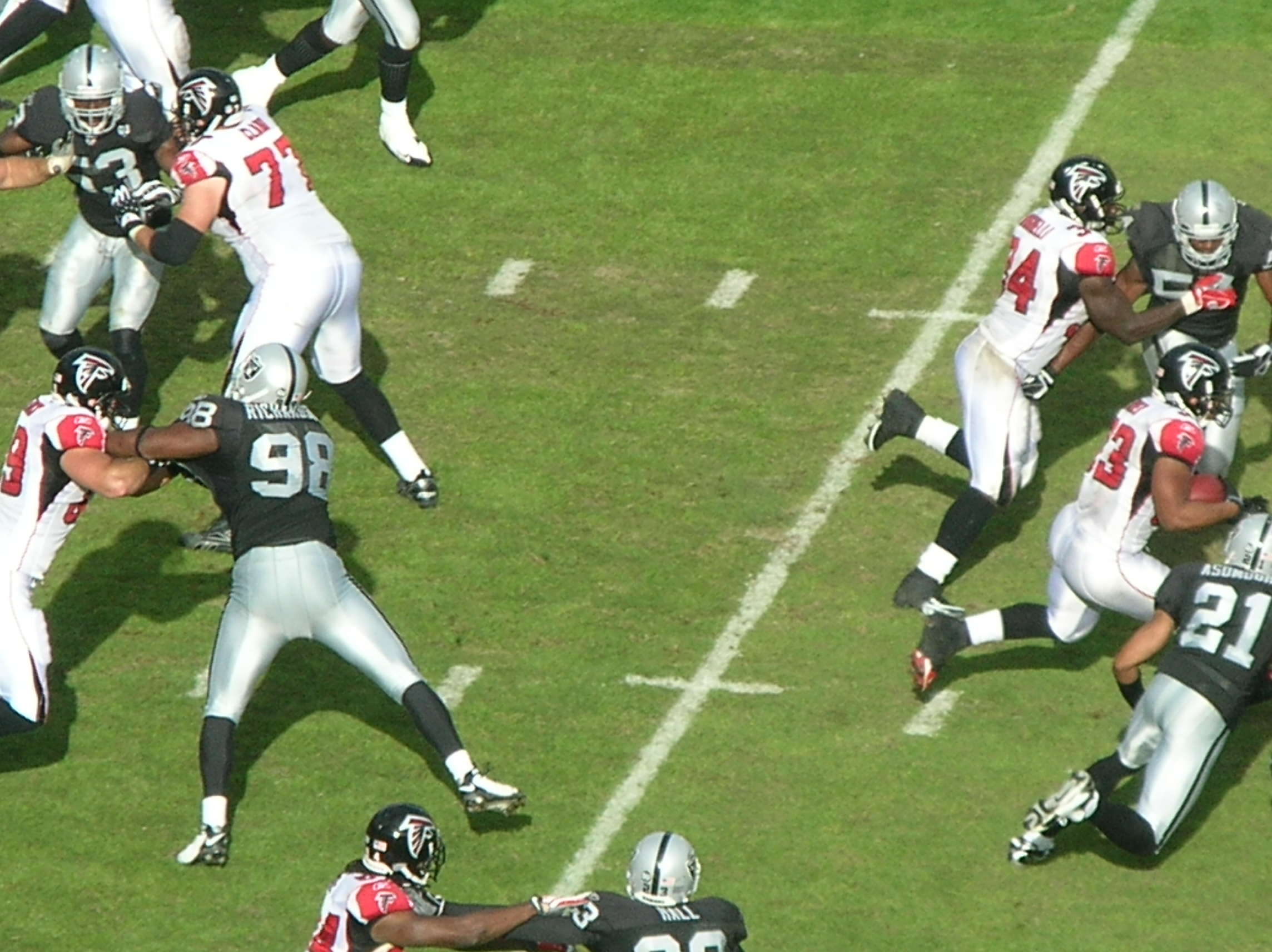
Turner (right) during a game against the Oakland Raiders.

On March 2, 2008, the Atlanta Falcons signed Turner to a six-year, $34.5 million contract with $15 million guaranteed. He was represented by agent James "Bus" Cook.

In his Falcon debut, Turner broke the Falcons' single game rushing record against the Detroit Lions on September 7, 2008, rushing for 220 yards on 22 carries with 2 touchdowns. His 220 yards against the Lions marked the third-highest opening day rushing total behind O. J. Simpson’s 250 yards in 1973 and Arian Foster's 231 yards in 2010 and his rushing total is also the most in NFL annals by a player in his first game with a new team and surpassed the previous mark of 202 yards setting by running back Gerald Riggs on September 2, 1984. Coincidentally, Turner became the first Falcons offensive player of the week following an NFL season opening weekend since Riggs earned the honor after setting his record in 1984. He was named NFC Offensive Player of the Week for this performance. On November 23, 2008, he set a personal record with 4 rushing TDs in a victory over the Carolina Panthers. He compiled 117 yards rushing during that same game. His seventeen rushing touchdowns during the 2008 season broke the Atlanta Falcons' single season record of 14 set by Jamal Anderson in 1998, it is also the second-most in NFL history for a first season with a team behind only Eric Dickerson (18). He finished the year with 1,699 yards (a 4.5 ypc avg) and 17 rushing touchdowns. He is the first Atlanta Falcon in history to start and finish a season with 200 yard rushing performances (220 against Detroit week 1 and 208 against St. Louis week 17).

On December 16, 2008, Turner was named to the 2009 Pro Bowl, along with fellow Falcon WR Roddy White.

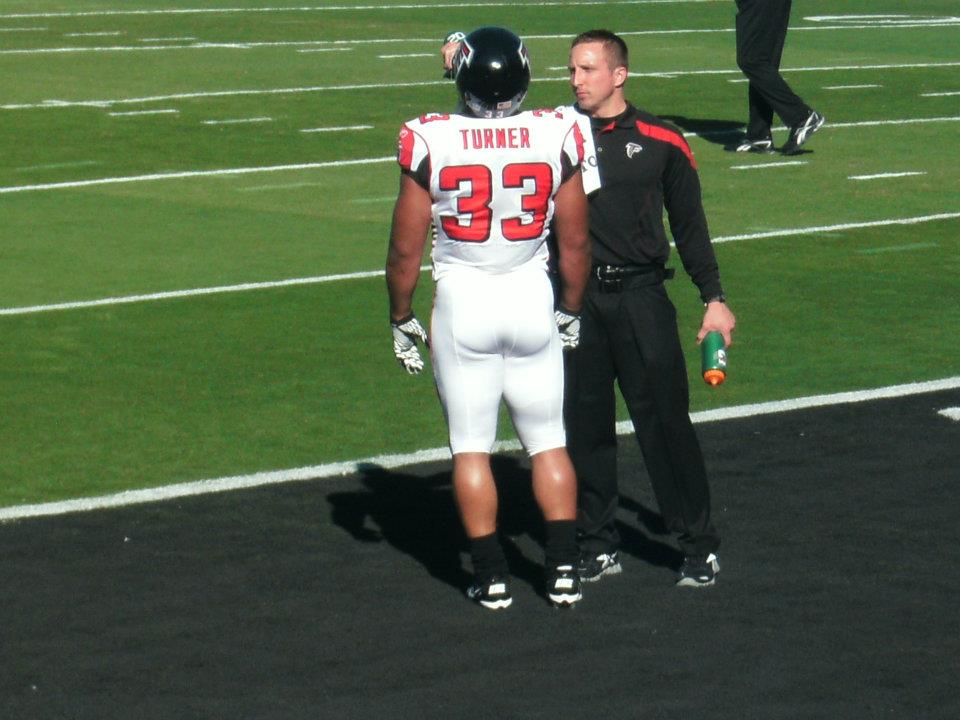
Turner during the 2011 season.

Turner and teammates Roddy White, Eric Weems, Ovie Mughelli, Brent Grimes, Tony Gonzalez, John Abraham, Tyson Clabo, and Matt Ryan were voted to the 2011 Pro Bowl. Turner was ranked 42nd by his fellow players on the NFL Top 100 Players of 2011.

On January 1, 2012, Turner broke Gerald Riggs's franchise rushing touchdown record against the Tampa Bay Buccaneers. Turner rushed for two touchdowns, bringing his total rushing touchdowns as a Falcon to 60. He was ranked 88th by his fellow players on the NFL Top 100 Players of 2012.

On March 1, 2013, Turner was released by the Falcons after failing a physical, saving the team $6.9 million in salary-cap space.

After his release from the Falcons, Turner did not sign with another NFL team.

=== Falcons franchise records ===
- Most career rushing touchdowns (60)
- Most rushing touchdowns in a season: 17 (2008)

== Career statistics ==
Legend
	Led the league
**Bold**	Career high

=== NFL ===
Year	Team	Games		Rushing					Receiving					Fumbles	
Year	Team	GP	GS	Att	Yds	Avg	Lng	TD	Rec	Yds	Avg	Lng	TD	Fum	Lost
2004	SD	14	1	20	104	5.2	30	0	4	8	2.0	7	0	1	1
2005	SD	16	0	57	335	5.9	**83T**	3	0	0	0.0	0	0	0	0
2006	SD	13	0	80	502	**6.3**	73	2	3	47	**15.7**	30	0	0	0
2007	SD	16	0	71	316	4.5	74T	1	4	16	4.0	12	0	1	1
2008	ATL	16	16	**376**	**1,699**	4.5	70T	**17**	6	41	6.8	18	0	3	**2**
2009	ATL	11	11	178	871	4.9	58T	10	5	35	7.0	10	0	**4**	**2**
2010	ATL	16	15	334	1,371	4.1	55	12	12	85	7.1	19	0	2	**2**
2011	ATL	16	15	301	1,340	4.5	81T	11	17	**168**	9.9	32	0	3	**2**
2012	ATL	16	16	222	800	3.6	43	10	**19**	128	6.7	**60T**	**1**	3	1
Total		134	74	1,639	7,338	4.5	83	66	70	528	7.5	60	1	17	11

=== College ===
Season	Team	GP	Rushing				Receiving		
Season	Team	GP	Att	Yds	Avg	TD	Rec	Yds	TD
2000	NIU	11	200	983	4.9	7	4	45	0
2001	NIU	10	92	395	4.3	3	10	76	0
2002	NIU	12	**338**	**1,915**	**5.7**	**19**	10	100	0
2003	NIU	12	310	1,648	5.3	14	**19**	**230**	**3**
Total		45	940	4,941	5.3	43	43	451	3
