= North Chicago School District 187 =

School district in Illinois, United States

Location
- North Chicago, Illinois United States
- Coordinates: 42°19′27″N 87°51′20″W

District information
- Type: Public
- Grades: PreK–12
- Schools: 10
- NCES District ID: 1700110

Students and staff
- Students: 3,983
- Teachers: 238.30 (on FTE basis)
- Student–teacher ratio: 16.71:1

Other information
- Website: d187.org

North Chicago School District 187 is an Illinois school district headquartered in the Lake County city of North Chicago.

== Schools ==
- Green Bay Early Childhood Center (PreK)
- Alexander (formerly North) (K-3)
- Forrestal (K-3)
- A.J. Katzenmeier (4-5)
- Neal Math and Science Academy (6-8)
- North Chicago Community High School (9-12)

District 187 previously governed ten schools: one early childhood center (Howard A. Yeager School), six elementary schools (A.J. Katzenmeier School, Forrestal Elementary School, Green Bay Elementary School, Marjorie P. Hart Elementary School, North Elementary School and South Elementary School), two middle/junior high schools (Novak 6th Grade Center and Neal Math and Science Academy) and one high school (North Chicago Community High School).

In 2013, the district closed two campuses, Green Bay and South. In 2014, it also closed the Novak-King Sixth Grade Center, followed by the closure of Yeager in 2017. These closures followed the district’s earlier decision to close Marjorie P. Hart Elementary School in 2012.The district reopened Green Bay Elementary School as the Green Bay Early Childhood Center.

District 187 has faced financial challenges dating back to the 1980s and 1990s. In 1993, the Board of Education voted to close the district.
