= Ike Nwamu =

Nigerian-American basketball player

No. 8 – KB Bashkimi
- Position: Shooting guard / point guard
- League: Kosovo Basketball Superleague

Personal information
- Born: June 3, 1993 (age 33) Los Angeles, California, U.S.
- Listed height: 6 ft 4 in (1.93 m)
- Listed weight: 200 lb (91 kg)

Career information
- High school: Asheboro (Asheboro, North Carolina); Westchester Country Day School (High Point, North Carolina)
- College: Cleveland State (2011–2012); Mercer (2013–2015); UNLV (2015–2016)
- NBA draft: 2016: undrafted
- Playing career: 2016–present

Career history
- 2016–2018: Sioux Falls Skyforce
- 2018: Lavrio Megabolt
- 2018: Milwaukee Bucks
- 2018–2019: Wisconsin Herd
- 2019-2020: Fort Wayne Mad Ants
- 2020: Northern Arizona Suns
- 2020: Cholet Basket
- 2021: BC Samara
- 2021: Ironi Ness Ziona
- 2021-2022: BC Samara
- 2023-2024: SLUC Nancy Basket
- 2024: Sokół Łańcut
- 2024-2025: Chartres Métropole Basket
- 2025: MKE Ankaragücü
- 2026–present: KB Bashkimi
- Stats at Basketball Reference

Ikechukwu Sean Nwamu (born June 3, 1993) is an American-born Nigerian professional basketball player for KB Bashkimi of the Kosovo Basketball Superleague. He has played professionally in the NBA G League and across Europe, including Greece, Israel, Russia, France, Poland, Türkiye, and Kosovo. Nwamu is a 2020 Olympian and a member of the Nigerian national basketball team.

== Early life ==
Nwamu was born in Los Angeles, California, to Nigerian parents.

He attended Asheboro High School before transferring to Westchester Country Day School, where he continued his development against higher-level competition. During his high school years, he gained widespread online attention for his dunking ability, with several of his dunks circulating on YouTube and social media, helping raise his national profile prior to his collegiate career.

== College career ==
Nwamu began his collegiate career at Cleveland State University before transferring to Mercer University. After sitting out the 2012–13 season due to NCAA transfer rules, he developed into one of the program’s top perimeter players.

=== Mercer (2013–2015) ===
Nwamu was a member of the Mercer team that defeated Duke in the 2014 NCAA Tournament. In two appearances during the 2014 NCAA Tournament, he averaged 11.5 points per game, scoring 11 points in Mercer’s first-round upset of Duke and 12 points in the second-round game against Tennessee.

During the 2014–15 season, Nwamu averaged 15.1 points per game and recorded several notable performances against high-major opponents, including a 30-point game against Tennessee. He was named First-Team All-Southern Conference.

=== UNLV (2015–2016) ===
For his senior season, Nwamu transferred to the UNLV Runnin’ Rebels and competed in the Mountain West Conference. He averaged 11.4 points, 3.2 rebounds, and 1.7 assists per game.

He recorded a career-high 38 points in a triple-overtime victory against the Air Force Falcons during the Mountain West Conference tournament.

== Professional career ==
=== NBA G League (2016–2020) ===
After going undrafted in the 2016 NBA draft, Nwamu began his professional career in the NBA Development League (later the NBA G League). He was selected by the Sioux Falls Skyforce and later played for the Wisconsin Herd, Fort Wayne Mad Ants, and Northern Arizona Suns.

During the 2017–18 season with Sioux Falls, he averaged 14.6 points per game, set a franchise record for three-pointers made in a single season, and recorded two 30-point performances.

During the 2019–20 season with Northern Arizona, Nwamu averaged 17.7 points per game and recorded nine 20-point games.

=== Lavrio Megabolt (2018) ===
In March 2018, Nwamu signed with Lavrio Megabolt of the Greek Basket League and remained with the club through the league playoffs.

=== Miami Heat Summer League and Milwaukee Bucks (2018) ===
Nwamu competed with the Miami Heat during the 2018 NBA Summer League in Las Vegas, averaging 11.0 points, 3.8 rebounds, and 1.2 assists per game across four appearances. He later signed a training-camp deal with the Milwaukee Bucks.

=== Cholet Basket (2020) ===
In June 2020, Nwamu signed with Cholet Basket before parting ways with the club in October 2020 prior to the start of the season.

=== BC Samara (2020–2021) ===
In March 2021, Nwamu signed with BC Samara of the Russian Super League 1. In 14 games, he averaged 19.6 points, 2.9 rebounds, 1.9 assists, and 1.1 steals per game, finished as the league’s top scorer, and helped the club win the league championship. He was named Import Player of the Year, Most Spectacular Player, and selected to the All-League First Team.

=== Ironi Ness Ziona (2021–2022) ===
Nwamu later joined Ironi Ness Ziona of the Israeli Basketball Premier League, averaging 8.3 points per game in league play and 13.5 points per game during FIBA Europe Cup qualification.

=== Return to BC Samara (2021–2022) ===
Following his stint in Israel, Nwamu returned to BC Samara, averaging 17.4 points, 3.1 rebounds, and 2.2 assists per game during his second spell with the club.

=== SLUC Nancy Basket (2023–2024) ===
In January 2023, Nwamu signed with SLUC Nancy Basket. He re-signed for the 2023–24 season and remained with the club through December 2023.

=== Sokół Łańcut (2023–2024) ===
Nwamu played for Sokół Łańcut of the Polish Basketball League, averaging 18.2 points, 3.3 rebounds, and 3.2 assists per game.

=== Chartres Métropole Basket (2024–2025) ===
During the 2024–25 season, Nwamu played for Chartres Métropole Basket in LNB Pro B, averaging 13.7 points, 2.6 rebounds, and 3.2 assists per game, while shooting 45.6 percent from the field and 40.1 percent from three-point range. He won the LNB All-Star Game Dunk Contest in 2024.

=== MKE Ankaragücü (2025–2026) ===
Nwamu later signed with MKE Ankaragücü of the Turkish Basketball League, averaging 16.7 points, 4.7 assists, and 3.1 rebounds per game.

=== KB Bashkimi (2026–present) ===
Nwamu currently plays for KB Bashkimi of the Kosovo Basketball Superleague.

== International career ==
Nwamu represents Nigeria internationally.

At AfroBasket 2017, Nigeria won the silver medal. Over six games, Nwamu averaged 14.5 points, 2.7 rebounds, and 2.5 assists per game and was named the tournament’s Best Shooter.

He competed in the 2018 FIBA World Cup qualifiers, averaging 13.5 points per game, and appeared in AfroBasket qualification windows in 2021 (6.0 points per game) and 2025 (12.0 points, 5.3 rebounds, and 6.3 assists per game).

Nwamu is a 2020 Olympian and represented Nigeria at the Tokyo 2020 Summer Olympics. During Olympic preparation, he recorded 13 points and 7 rebounds in Nigeria’s historic exhibition victory over the United States.

Prior to the final qualification window for AfroBasket 2025, Nwamu was named team captain. At AfroBasket 2025, he averaged 11.3 points, 4.0 rebounds, and 1.3 assists per game across four tournament games.

== Honors and awards ==
- Russian Super League 1 Champion (2021)
- Russian Super League 1 Top Scorer (2021)
- Russian Super League 1 Import Player of the Year (2021)
- Russian Super League 1 Most Spectacular Player (2021)
- All-Russian Super League 1 First Team (2021)
- LNB All-Star Game Dunk Contest winner (2024)
- Olympian (Tokyo 2020)
- First-Team All-Southern Conference (2015)
