= Andrew Quarless =

American football player (born 1988)

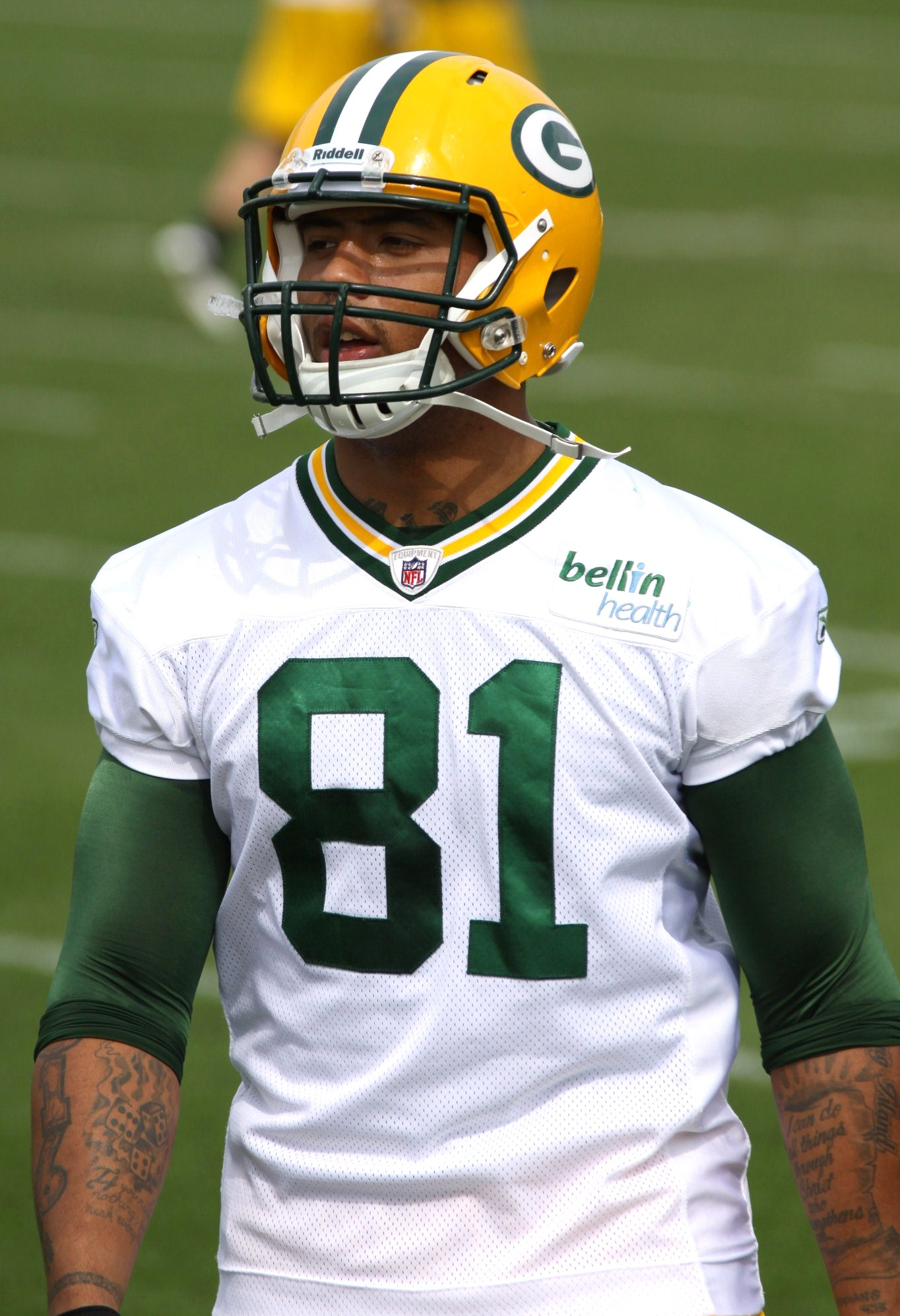
- Quarless with the Green Bay Packers in 2011

No. 81, 82
- Position: Tight end

Personal information
- Born: October 6, 1988 (age 38); Uniondale, New York, U.S.
- Listed height: 6 ft 4 in (1.93 m)
- Listed weight: 252 lb (114 kg)

Career information
- High school: Uniondale
- College: Penn State
- NFL draft: 2010: 5th round, 154th overall pick

Career history
- Green Bay Packers (2010–2015); Detroit Lions (2016)

Awards and highlights
- Super Bowl champion (XLV)

Career NFL statistics
- Receptions: 89
- Receiving yards: 940
- Receiving touchdowns: 6
- Stats at Pro Football Reference

Andrew Christopher Quarless (born October 6, 1988) is an American former professional football player who was a tight end in the National Football League (NFL). He played college football for the Penn State Nittany Lions. Quarless was selected by the Green Bay Packers in the fifth round of the 2010 NFL draft and later won Super Bowl XLV with them over the Pittsburgh Steelers. He was also a member of the Detroit Lions.

== Early life ==
Quarless attended Turtle Hook Junior High School in Uniondale, New York, then received a scholarship to Holy Trinity High School on Long Island until his junior year when he transferred to Uniondale High School. It was there that he had his greatest season before entering Penn State. After winning the Super Bowl he returned to Uniondale, where he was honored by Uniondale Ave being renamed "Andrew Quarless Way".

== College career ==
Quarless had a breakout season as a true freshman in 2006. He was pushed into Joe Paterno in a game against Wisconsin, which broke Paterno's leg. Success in the 2007 season was limited due to suspensions and loss of his starting position at tight end to Mickey Shuler, Jr. Quarless saw limited playing time in 2008 until the Illinois game when he started in the place of an injured Shuler and caught a key 4th quarter touchdown. He made the game-winning catch in the 2010 East-West Shrine Game.

== Professional career ==
Pre-draft measurables
Height	Weight	Arm length	Hand span	40-yard dash	10-yard split	20-yard split	20-yard shuttle	Three-cone drill	Vertical jump	Broad jump	Bench press	Wonderlic
6 ft 4 3/8 in (1.94 m)	254 lb (115 kg)	34 in (0.86 m)	10 1/4 in (0.26 m)	4.69 s	1.70 s	2.80 s	4.57 s	7.29 s	32.0 in (0.81 m)	9 ft 11 in (3.02 m)	23 reps	17
All values from NFL Combine/Pro Day

=== Green Bay Packers ===
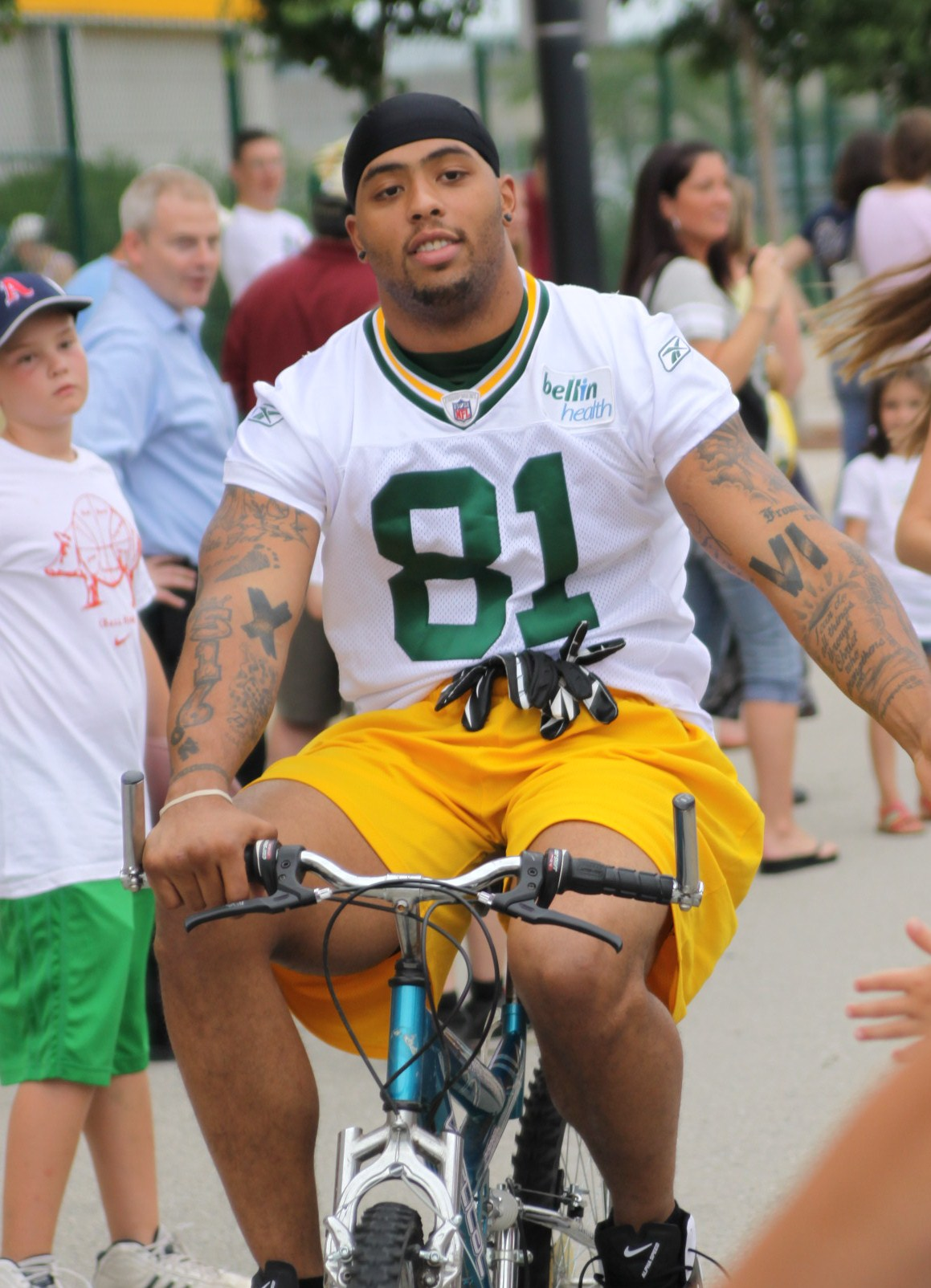
Quarless in August 2011

Quarless was selected in the fifth round (154th overall) by the Green Bay Packers in the 2010 NFL draft. On July 12, 2010, he signed a contract with the Packers. Quarless scored his first NFL career touchdown against the Minnesota Vikings. In the 2010 regular season, he had picked up 238 yards. He had 21 receptions averaging 11.3 yards per catch. At the end of the 2010 season, Quarless and the Packers appeared in Super Bowl XLV against the Pittsburgh Steelers. He had one reception for five yards in the game. In 2011, he had three receptions for 36 yards and was the primary backup to Jermichael Finley. His role was a blocker. He suffered a season-ending knee injury in a 4th quarter kickoff return in the 38-35 win against the New York Giants on Sunday December 4, 2011. On December 7, 2011, Quarless was placed on injured reserve. He was placed on reserve/physically unable to perform on August 27, 2012. On November 7, 2012, Quarless was activated from reserve/physically unable to perform. He was placed on injured reserve on December 1, 2012. On March 13, 2014, Quarless was re-signed by the Packers. He was placed on injured reserve – designated for return on September 30, 2015. On December 21, 2015, Quarless was activated from injured reserve – designated for return. He was placed on injured reserve on January 15, 2016.

=== Detroit Lions ===
On August 15, 2016, Quarless was signed by the Detroit Lions. He was released by the Lions on September 19.

=== Statistics ===
Source: NFL.com

Year	Team	G	GS	Receiving					Fumbles	
Year	Team	G	GS	Rec	Yds	Avg	Lng	TD	Fum	Lost
Regular season
2010	GB	13	3	21	238	11.3	23	1	1	1
2011	GB	10	2	3	36	12.0	21	0	0	0
2013	GB	16	10	32	312	9.8	22	2	0	0
2014	GB	16	11	29	323	11.1	34	3	0	0
2015	GB	5	1	4	31	7.8	13	0	0	0
Total		60	27	89	940	10.6	34	6	1	1
Postseason
2010	GB	4	1	5	46	9.2	15	0	0	0
2013	GB	1	1	1	8	8.0	8	0	0	0
2014	GB	2	0	4	31	7.8	13	1	0	0
2015	GB	1	0	0	0	0.0	0	0	0	0
Total		8	2	10	85	8.5	15	1	0	0

== The "Macho Gun Incident" ==
On July 4, 2015, Quarless was arrested and charged with discharging a firearm in public in Miami Beach. Miami Beach Police were called by a parking attendant who witnessed Quarless' dispute and the firearm discharge who reported that Quarless and Michael Ritchie approached a white car filled with women. The attendant heard the women yell, "No! Get away! Leave me alone!"

Quarless then took out a semiautomatic handgun and fired two shots. One woman felt that Quarless did this "in an attempt to emphasize his dominance and manhood." Quarless was discovered by police, along with his handgun, attempting to hide in bushes in front of a nearby tavern. Bullets found at the scene of the crime matched the gun Quarless was found with.

On August 12, 2016, he was suspended by the NFL for the first two games of the 2016 season for violating the league's personal conduct policy.
