= North Chicago Community High School =

High school in Illinois, US

Location
- 1717 17th St. North Chicago, Illinois 60064; United States
- 42°19′37″N 87°51′14″W

Information
- School type: public, secondary
- Opened: 1954
- School district: North Chicago Community Unit School District 187
- NCES District ID: 1700110
- CEEB code: 143220
- NCES School ID: 170011005370
- Teaching staff: 57.00 (FTE)
- Grades: 9–12
- Gender: coed
- Enrollment: 870 (2023–2024)
- Student to teacher ratio: 15.26
- Campus type: suburban
- Colors: red white
- Athletics conference: Northern Lake County Conference
- Team name: (Lady) Warhawks
- Newspaper: The Hawkeye
- Website: School website

North Chicago Community High School, also known as North Chicago and NCCHS, is a public four-year high school located in North Chicago, Illinois, a northern suburb of Chicago, in the United States. It is part of North Chicago School District 187. Due to its proximity to the Naval Station Great Lakes, the school serves military families, resulting in a slightly higher than average mobility rate.

== History ==
North Chicago Community High School (NCCHS) was established in 1954. Before this facility was erected, high school students had to attend the Waukegan High School in the neighboring city of Waukegan, Illinois. Currently North Chicago Community High School is a 22,000-square-foot (2,000 m^{2}) facility with a 750-seat auditorium, library, fine arts facilities, 450-seat cafeteria, two gyms, and a chemistry lab built in 1997. The high school serves approximately 754 students in the North Chicago and Great Lakes area.

== Academics ==
North Chicago Community High School has a number of Advanced Placement (AP) and Honors courses available to students. The school also has four guidance counselors as well as a university and college counselor available to students. The school is also a member of the Lake County High Schools Tech Campus at the College of Lake County (CLC), which offers career-based college level training to aspiring high school students, while also broadening their exposure to other students and internship opportunities in Lake County, Illinois. This program has been praised for its academic viability and because students have the opportunity to earn three credits (toward both high school and college) for one class during a two-hour period during their school day.

Various colleges, such as Northwestern University and Robert Morris University, make regular visits to North Chicago to attract college-bound students. The school is also home to the North Chicago branch of the I Have a Dream Foundation, which recruits a special group of high achieving students from the grade school level and moves on with them through high school, helping them to complete difficult school work, make important college decisions, and plan their future. The average class size is 14.6, with the number of enrolled students in 2010 recorded at 916. Culture improvements include, implementation of a new student advisory board and volunteer service requirements for graduation.

North Chicago hosted a series of restructuring meetings, community members working together to implement effective positive changes. Recently there has been a turnover of principals and a tightening of school rules and policies as mandated by the District 187 Board of Education and the state of Illinois.

== Athletics ==
North Chicago competes in the Northern Lake County Conference and Illinois High School Association. Its mascot is the Warhawks. Various sports are open to participating students during the fall, spring, and winter sports seasons: 1) Fall- Boys football, boys and girls cross country, girls tennis, and girls volleyball and boys soccer; 2) Winter- Boys and girls basketball, girls bowling, and boys and girls wrestling; 3) Spring- Boys and girls track and field, girls soccer, boys volleyball, and boys tennis.

== Notable alumni ==
- Terry Link – Illinois State Senator
- Tyrone Smith – Professional Long Jumper, 2008 Olympian
- Tiffany Brooks (designer) – HGTV Design Star Winner, Host of "Most Embarrassing Rooms in America
- Thaddeus Coleman – professional football player
- O'Brien Schofield – former NFL player
- Michael Turner – All-Pro NFL running back

== Notable staff ==
- Guy Curtright was the school's athletic director and baseball coach from its opening in 1954 until 1972. He was a former MLB player with the Chicago White Sox.
- Glen Kozlowski was the school's head football coach. He is a former NFL wide receiver (1987–92), having played his entire career for the Chicago Bears.
