= Nathan Overbay =

American football player (born 1987)

No. 81
- Position: Tight end

Personal information
- Born: January 4, 1987 (age 39); Lakewood, Washington, U.S.
- Listed height: 6 ft 5 in (1.96 m)
- Listed weight: 270 lb (122 kg)

Career information
- High school: Chehalis (WA) W. F. West
- College: Eastern Washington
- NFL draft: 2010: undrafted

Career history
- Denver Broncos (2010)*; Miami Dolphins (2010)*; Tampa Bay Buccaneers (2010); Detroit Lions (2011–2012)*; Pittsburgh Steelers (2013)*; Houston Texans (2013)*; Baltimore Ravens (2013–2014)*
- * Offseason or practice squad member only
- Stats at Pro Football Reference

Nathan Overbay (born January 4, 1987) is an American former football tight end. He played college football at Eastern Washington.

== College career ==
Overbay signed with Eastern Washington in 2005. After redshirting his first year, Overbay would see time as a reserve tight end in 2006 before starting eleven total games from 2007 to 2008.

In 2009, Overbay put together his best season, recording 51 catches for 588 yards in 2009 with 13 touchdowns. His catch and touchdown total are single-season records at Eastern Washington for a tight end. Overbay was named to the All-Big Sky Conference First-team and was named a Third-team All-American by The Sports Network.

In his 43-game career, he caught 93 passes for 1,189 yards and 19 touchdowns.

Overbay was selected to participate in the 2010 East-West Shrine Game. He participated in this game with his teammate, Quarterback Matt Nichols.

== Professional career ==
Overbay was eligible for the 2010 NFL draft, but went undrafted. He signed a free agent deal with the Denver Broncos on April 26, 2010. Overbay went to training camp with the Broncos, but was released by Denver on the final round of cuts on September 3, 2010.

On September 6, 2010, the Miami Dolphins signed Overbay to their practice squad. He remained with the Dolphins until being signed by the Tampa Bay Buccaneers to their practice squad on October 26, 2010. The Buccaneers promoted Overbay to the 53-man active roster on December 20, 2010, but he was declared inactive for the team's final two regular season games. Overbay would remain with Tampa Bay until being cut on September 3, 2011.

The Detroit Lions signed Overbay to their practice squad on September 14, 2011. He would spend the next two years on and off with the Lions until being released for the final time on June 4, 2013.

On August 8, 2013, the Pittsburgh Steelers signed Overbay, but he would last only a month with the team, being released on August 31, 2013. The Houston Texans would pick up Overbay on September 18, 2013. He would remain with the Texans until being released on November 20, 2013.

Overbay would be signed by the Baltimore Ravens on December 18, 2013. He would go on to sign a futures contract with the Ravens on December 30, 2013.

== Personal life ==
Overbay is the nephew of Major League Baseball player Lyle Overbay.
