= Westchester Country Day School =

American country day school in North Carolina

Location
- 2045 N Old Greensboro Rd; High Point, North Carolina 27265; United States; 35°58′25″N 80°05′14″W

Information
- Type: Private, country day, college preparatory
- Motto: "Mens Sana in Corpore Sano" (A healthy mind in a healthy body)
- Religious affiliation: Nonsectarian
- Established: 1967 (59 years ago)
- Head of school: Mary Keever
- Faculty: 55
- Gender: Co-educational
- Enrollment: 419 (2009–2010)
- Student to teacher ratio: 7:1
- Campus size: 53 acres (0.21 km^{2})
- Campus type: Rural
- Colors: Blue & White
- Athletics: North Carolina Independent Schools Athletic Association (NCISAA)
- Athletics conference: Piedmont Triad Athletic Conference (PTAC)
- Mascot: Wildcat
- Nickname: Wildcats
- Team name: Westchester Wildcats
- Accreditation: SAIS
- School fees: Application: $75; International student fee: $2,000; Student Activities: $300–$2,250; Transportation: $660–$1,300
- Tuition: PreK: $7,750–$9,420 (K–12): $2,764–$23,140
- Website: www.westchestercds.org

Westchester Country Day School, formerly called Westchester Academy, is an independent, nonsectarian school that is situated just outside High Point, North Carolina, United States.

After an interim period with Jim Cantwell in the 2009–2010 school year, Cobb Atkinson, the former Headmaster at the Valwood School, was hired as the permanent Head of School in July 2010. He retired at the end of 2022.

== Notable features ==
- The school was founded in 1967 making it the oldest Kindergarten-12 independent school in the Piedmont Triad.
- In 2003–2004 the school won the Wachovia Cup, a medal that goes to the school with the strongest athletic program in its classification in North Carolina.
- It has a weather station which is frequently used by WFMY and can be accessed via Weatherbug.
- Over fifty percent of the teaching staff hold advanced degrees (Doctorate, Masters, etc.).
- One hundred percent of all Westchester graduates are accepted into college.
- The class of 2018 included 35 graduates with a total of $1.3m in scholarship offers, averaging approximately $44,800 per student.
- The school has taken many trips to foreign countries including England, Costa Rica, Ireland, Wales, Italy, Germany, Puerto Rico, France, Scotland and many others.
- The school added a PK in the fall of 2012.
- The 50th anniversary took place in the year 2017.
- The school has the same name as the one where the Dork Diaries book story is set.

== Arts & athletics ==
- Community service starts in sixth grade and can be continued throughout the twelfth grade.
- Music, technology, and art are mandatory classes through eighth grade. In the middle school, students learn to play the piano in 7th grade and the guitar in 8th grade.
- Sports at Westchester include: basketball, golf, volleyball, tennis, track & field, cross country, swimming, soccer, baseball and cheerleading.

=== Men's basketball ===
In recent years, the Wildcats Men's Basketball team has been extremely successful, acquiring a 55–3 record over the past two seasons (.948) and won the Triad Athletic Conference Championship two years in a row. Home games regularly sell out the Finch Center, resulting in standing-room only crowds. Most games are videotaped by the professional videographers of hoopmixtape.com and oneentertainmenthoops.com, both of which are companies who videotape strong High School Basketball programs in the South. The Wildcats have been recognized by the national media, most notably ESPN's SportsCenter, twice in the past two seasons, both for acrobatic dunks during games. The first, which occurred in January 2009, was a double alley-oop, where Georg Wolff lobbed the ball to Deuce Bello, who then again lobbed it to Ike Nwamu who dunked the ball. In 2010, Deuce Bello performed a between-the-legs dunk during a game, a feat that is very rarely achieved, and was interviewed by SportsCenter's Jay Harris. Another play shown on sportscenter was a play involving Andre Iguodala and westchester graduate Quincy Miller.

== Facilities ==
There are now six buildings on the rural campus, the largest being the Finch Center, which includes Foreign Language, a computer lab, science, and health rooms. It also includes a basketball court. The newest building addition is the cafeteria, also known as the Wilson Center, added around 2021-2022. This new building houses a senior lounge, bathrooms, a kitchen, the nurse's office, and another office currently being used for school counseling.

There is a gymnasium, two basketball courts, lighted soccer and baseball fields including indoor batting cages, and a practice soccer field.

== Competitive sports ==
=== Fall ===
- Soccer (boys)
- Volleyball (girls)
- Cross country (mixed)

=== Fall/Winter ===
- Basketball (boys) /A team/B team/C team
- Basketball (girls)
- Swimming (mixed)
- Cheerleading (mixed gender)
- Breakdancing (mixed)

=== Spring ===
- Baseball (boys)
- Soccer (girls)
- Tennis (mixed)
- Back (mixed)
- Ultimate (mixed)

== Notable alumni ==
- Elizabeth Horton — Miss North Carolina 2006 and current meteorologist
- Quincy Miller — professional basketball player; played in the NBA for the Denver Nuggets
- Ike Nwamu — professional basketball player
