= Hunter Lawrence (American football) =

American football player (born 1988)

No. 8
- Position: Placekicker

Personal information
- Born: June 28, 1988 (age 38); Boerne, Texas, U.S.
- Listed height: 6 ft 0 in (1.83 m)
- Listed weight: 187 lb (85 kg)

Career information
- College: Texas
- NFL draft: 2010: undrafted

Career history
- Tampa Bay Buccaneers (2010)*
- * Offseason or practice squad member only

Awards and highlights
- Third-team All-American (2009); Second-team All-Big 12 (2008)

Hunter Lawrence (born June 28, 1988) is an American former football placekicker. He played college football at the University of Texas at Austin.

== Early life ==
Lawrence attended Boerne High School in Boerne, Texas, where he was coached by Tommy Bludau. As a junior, he made 20 out of 25 field goals with a long of 48 yards with 2 being blocked, he also made 44 out of 46 point after touchdowns, which earned him first-team 4A all-state by the Associated Press and the Texas Sports Writers Association. He notably made four field goals during a playoff win over New Braunfels High School. As a senior Lawrence made 12 out of 19 FGs with 7 longer than 40 yards and long of 49 yards with 2 being blocked. He also made 43 out of 45 PATs which earned first team 4A all state by the Associated Press and second team by the Texas Sports Writers Association. Over his high school career, Lawrence made 32 of 44 FGs (.727) and 63 of 70 PATs (.900). Lawrence was considered the number three kicker in the nation in the recruiting class of 2006 and garnered three stars from ESPN and Rivals.com when he was recruited by the Longhorns (primarily for kickoffs due to his strong leg).

== College career ==
During his freshman year in 2006, Lawrence began handling the kickoff duties mid season and continued to do so as a sophomore in 2007.

When he became a junior in 2008, Lawrence earned his spot as the field goal kicker for the Longhorns which he continued in his 2009 senior season as well. His most notable kick came during the 2009 Big 12 Championship Game against the Nebraska Cornhuskers. In the fourth quarter with one second put back on the clock, Nebraska held a 12–10 lead over Texas. Coach Mack Brown sent Lawrence out on the field to attempt the game winning kick after an official review put 1 second back on the clock. From 46 yards out Lawrence hit the field goal as time expired, winning the game 13–12, thus securing the Longhorns' third Big 12 Championship, as well as a BCS National Championship Game berth.

== Professional career ==
Even though no kickers were selected in the 2010 NFL draft, Lawrence was quickly contacted by the Tampa Bay Buccaneers and signed after a brief tryout. The Buccaneers only had one kicker that they had just picked up in 2009. On August 24, 2010, the Buccaneers released Lawrence.
