= BBC Online =

Brand name and home for the BBC's online service

- The BBC international website in March 2022
- Website type: Portal
- Owner: BBC
- Creator: BBC
- Website: www.bbc.co.uk (UK) www.bbc.com (International)
- Commercial: No (Yes if accessed outside the UK)
- Registration: Optional
- Launched: April 1994; 32 years ago (www.bbci.com domain registered); 11 May 1994; 32 years ago (launched the BBC Networking Club); 28 April 1997; 29 years ago (as BBC Online)
- Current status: Active

BBC Online, formerly known as BBCi, is the BBC's online service. It is a large network of websites including such high-profile sites as BBC News and Sport, the on-demand video and radio services branded BBC iPlayer and BBC Sounds, the children's sites CBBC and CBeebies, and learning services such as Bitesize and Own It. The BBC has had an online presence supporting its TV and radio programmes and web-only initiatives since April 1994, but did not launch officially until 28 April 1997, following government approval to fund it by TV licence fee revenue as a service in its own right. Throughout its history, the online plans of the BBC have been subject to competition and complaint from its commercial rivals, which has resulted in various public consultations and government reviews to investigate their claims that its large presence and public funding distorts the UK market.

The website has gone through several branding changes since it was launched. Originally named BBC Online, it was rebranded as BBCi (which itself was the brand name for interactive TV services) before being named bbc.co.uk. It was then renamed BBC Online again in 2008, although the service uses the branding "BBC".

On 26 February 2010 The Times claimed that Mark Thompson, then Director General of the BBC, proposed that the BBC's web output should be cut by 50%, with online staff numbers and budgets reduced by 25% in a bid to scale back BBC operations and allow commercial rivals more room. On 2 March 2010, the BBC reported that it would cut its website spending by 25% and close BBC 6 Music and Asian Network. On 24 January 2011, the confirmed cuts of 25% were announced, leaving a £34 million shortfall. This resulted in the closure of several sites, including BBC Switch, BBC Blast, 6-0-6, and the announcement of plans to sell the Douglas Adams created site h2g2.

== History ==
=== Early years ===
www.bbc.co.uk was introduced in April 1994 with some regional information and Open University Production Centre (OUPC) content. By September, the first commercial service launched, a transcription service via FTP server. At its peak, it had 122 accounts, including FBI bureaus around the world, taking daily updates from 12 feeds.

Within 12 months, the BBC website offered "Auntie" online discussion groups; web pages for select web-related programs and BBC departments; free web pages for associate members.

The BBC Multimedia Centre was a team led by Martin Freeth to introduce new media across the corporation.

=== BBC Networking Club ===
The BBC Networking club, 1994

BBC Networking Club www.bbcnc.org.uk (the "nc" standing for "networking club") was launched by BBC Education on 11 May 1994 as a non-profit paid subscription service. For a joining fee of £25 and a monthly subscription of £12, members of the club were given access to an early type of social networking site featuring a bulletin board for sharing information and real-time conversation, along with a dialup Internet connection service.

=== BBC Online and beeb.com ===
BBC website as it appeared in 1997

The BBC Director General John Birt sought government approval to direct licence fee revenue into the service, describing planned BBC Internet services as the "third medium" joining the BBC's existing TV and radio networks, achieving a change in the BBC Charter. This led to the official launch of BBC Online at the www.bbc.co.uk address in April 1997.

As well as the licence fee funded www.bbc.co.uk, BBC Worldwide launched the commercially funded beeb.com, featuring mostly entertainment focused content, with sites including Radio Times, Top Gear and Top of the Pops. The development of these services formed the basis of a three-year agreement between BBC Worldwide and International Computers Limited, intended to assist the former in exploiting commercial opportunities in the "new medium" of the consumer Internet, while permitting the latter to gain commercial and technical experience and to position itself as a supplier to the media industry. Later, BBC Online launched licence-fee funded web sites for Top of the Pops and Top Gear, resulting in some duplication.

Beeb.com was later refocussed as an online shopping guide, and was closed in 2002. beeb.com later redirected to the BBC Shop website, run by BBC Worldwide.

In 1999, the BBC bought the bbc.com domain name, previously owned by Boston Business Computing, for $375,000, but the price of this purchase was not revealed until six years later. As of 2005, www.bbcnc.org.uk no longer exists.

=== BBCi ===
BBCi website navbar, 2004

In 2001, BBC Online was rebranded as BBCi; the website launched on 7 November 2001. The BBCi name was conceived as an umbrella brand for all the BBC's digital interactive services across web, digital teletext, interactive TV and on mobile platforms. The use of letter "i" prefixes and suffixes to denote information technology or interactivity was very much in vogue at this time; according to the BBC, the "i" in BBCi stood for "interactivity" as well as "innovation".

As part of the rebrand, BBC website pages all displayed a standard navigation bar across the top of the screen, offering category-based navigation: Categories, TV, Radio, Communicate, Where I Live, A-Z Index and a search function. The navbar was designed to offer a similar navigation system to the i-bar on BBCi interactive television.

=== bbc.co.uk and the return of BBC Online ===
Previous BBC Online logo

The BBC homepage in March 2010

After three years of consistent use across different platforms, the BBC began to drop the BBCi brand gradually; on 6 May 2004, the BBC website was renamed bbc.co.uk, after the main URL used to access the site. Interactive TV services continued under the BBCi brand until it was dropped completely in 2008. The BBC's online video player, the iPlayer has, however, retained an i-prefix in its branding.

On 14 December 2007, a beta version of a new bbc.co.uk homepage was launched, with the ability to customise the page by adding, removing and rearranging different categories, such as 'News', 'Weather' and 'Entertainment'. The widget-based design was inspired by sites such as Facebook and iGoogle, and allowed the BBC to add new content to the homepage while still retaining users' customisations. The new homepage also incorporated the clock design used in the 1970s on the BBC's television service into the large header and a box containing featured content of the website. The new BBC homepage left beta on Wednesday, 27 February 2008 to serve as the new BBC Homepage under the same URL as the previous version.

On 30 January 2010, a new webpage design became available as a beta version, that by May 2010, replaced the old homepage. This homepage expanded on the modules idea and the customisation theme. The website allowed certain themes that interested the viewer to be tracked, via a new module. It also included a new 'Media Zone' where featured content could be displayed, with this new featured box being located across the entire top of the webpage, below the header. The Media Zone was also changed so that the content changed by running the mouse over the tabs. The header was again changed to include the headings of the major sections of the website, these being: Home, News, Sport, Weather, iPlayer, TV, Radio and more, spread out evenly across the header. This new header was included across the entire website. Despite the cosmetic appearance of the relaunch, the new website was actually relaunched using a completely different operating system, allowing the site's four different international versions to be more easily altered. It also brought their website layouts and operations closer to that of the main website.

Following the launch of the new BBC News website, which altered the header bar on that site, in October 2010, the new style of header was launched across the whole website, starting off with some of the larger, yet not obvious, sites, such as Doctor Who, first before relaunching all of the sites, including the homepage with the new look. This new style of header included the headings as before, but with the search box redesigned and aligned right, as with the links which are significantly smaller. Other links, such as BBC id login and mobile versions of the website also appear on the header, just to the right of the smaller BBC logo.

The BBC Online homepage in 2011

On 21 September 2011, a new BBC homepage went into beta testing that was drastically different from those before it. The new homepage was based on feedback that stated that the current page was too narrow in focus and not distinctive enough, with the homepage not displaying the full extend of the BBC Online site and that some did not realise it was the homepage. As a result, they launched a new version that featured as a centrepiece a revolving carousel of content on the BBC Online website, with filters beneath to restrict it to, and to show more of entertainment, lifestyle, knowledge and news and sports topics. At the top of the page, a new header has been inserted giving the date, the time through the use of the vintage BBC clock, as well as weather prospects for the next three days through the use of the traditional weather symbols. Below the carousel, boxes contain links to the most popular video material, web articles and pages on the site, as well as TV and Radio listings alongside an A-Z list of the BBC's top level domains. This new site replaced the previous one on 30 November 2011. In a blog post from the same day, James Thornett explained the changes – while the post attracted complaints from users disliking the refreshed layout, the new-look site was critically acclaimed and nominated by the Design Museum as one of their Designs of the Year in 2012. It also won a Peabody Award in 2011 because it "continued, expanded and enhanced one of the greatest traditions in electronic media."

The BBC Online homepage in October 2016

== Content ==
BBC Online contains a variety of content ranging from News, Sport, Music, Science, Technology and Entertainment, amongst other things. The website has a British orientation, although the home page, news section and sports section each provide different content between UK and "International" visitors. There are also separate pages for Wales, Scotland and Northern Ireland written by the BBC Nations.

The website focuses around the primary top level domains of News, Sport, Weather, iPlayer, TV and Radio. These are easily accessible from the taskbar running across the top of all current BBC Online pages. However, other top level domains are also in existence: some are available from a drop down list on the taskbar including CBBC, CBeebies, Comedy, Food, Health, History, Learning, Music, Science and Nature, while other top level domains are only available through the A-Z index on the BBC website. These include Archives, Arts & Culture, Ethics, Gardening, Parenting, Religion and Travel news. However, there are many more top level domains – some 400 in March 2010 however this number has decreased as top level domains now frequently link to a lower domain name – that link to websites for individual services or programmes.

=== News, Sport and Weather ===
One of the most used aspects of the BBC Online website are the sections relating to News content, Sports results and news and Weather forecasts. The BBC News Online subsite launched in 1997 and received around 2 billion page views each month in 2012. The site contains journalistic content from the BBC covering news from the UK, both as a whole as well as regional news from the BBC Nations and Regions, and International content. The site also contains analysis from correspondents and other features from the Magazine section of the website. The BBC Sport Online subsite offers, in a similar way to news, a wide variety of material including sports results, live feeds to on-air programming, sports related news and analysis from commentators and pundits. The BBC Weather subsite primarily focuses on weather forecasts for UK and International locations, but also includes other features including Country guides that detail to geography and climate of each country, winter sports forecasts and during times of unusual or extreme weather, videos are produced explaining the causes for this weather.

=== iPlayer and Programmes sites ===
The BBC iPlayer subsite allows programmes to be viewed again after broadcast over the Internet. This successful site has now been expanded to include mobile views and downloads onto computers and mobiles allowing viewing for up to 30 days after broadcast.

BBC Programmes is a service of BBC Online which provides a page for every television and radio programme broadcast by the BBC in the United Kingdom. It was launched in October 2007 and gives each programme an eight or eleven digit identifier which is used to provide a permanent URL. It currently only holds data from the launch date plus a selection of high-profile programmes (notably Natural History programmes and Radio 4 programmes), but Jana Bennett, Director of BBC Vision, said in June 2008 that the BBC will eventually add a page for each programme it has broadcast over its history to the service.

BBC Programmes is available as HTML and RDF/XML and JSON.

The BBC Programme Catalogue is an internal archive of the BBC back catalogue which was briefly available online to the public in beta.

=== Sounds ===
BBC Sounds is an internet streaming, catchup, radio and Podcast service from the BBC. The service is available on a wide range of devices, including mobile phones and tablets, personal computers, and smart televisions. It was launched in November 2018 and replaces the 'iPlayer Radio' branded service, and the mobile apps currently complement the existing iPlayer Radio native applications, which remain available.

=== Knowledge and learning ===
The BBC also operates numerous sub sites that focus on different topics and subjects to expand the knowledge of the reader. These are mainly centred around the topics of Science, Nature, Arts and Culture, Religion and Ethics, Food and History. Each of these sub sites feature new articles published on the topic and contain other collections relating to the topic.

For example, the Food site contains recipes featured on various BBC cookery programmes, the History site has an interactive timeline of key events and individuals, the Nature site contains a database of creatures, and the Language site teaches phrases and more in 40 languages. Included in this range was the well received Your Paintings website that catalogued every painting in public ownership for view.

Until 2013, the BBC also hosted a health website with detailed information, checked by professionals, of medical conditions and symptoms. However, the BBC withdrew the site as this service is available from other sources on the Internet which did not exist when the Health site launched, the most prominent of which is NHS Choices.

In addition to these subsites, the BBC also runs sites dedicated to education and learning. These include the Bitesize revision website for teenagers and a section with resources for teachers including Learning Zone Class Clips that provides video from educational programmes for use in the classroom.

The BBC plans to merge this content into one easier to access site in the foreseeable future.

BBC Own It is an offshoot that provides online safety advice for parents, teachers, and young people to help them make positive choices online. It follows in the footsteps of other online safety services such as Internet Matters and Childnet.

=== Children's ===
The BBC runs a comprehensive children's website. It includes information on all of CBBC's shows along with several subsites covering art, sport, news, and other current events. Its message boards are especially popular with children who use them to communicate with each other about all of CBBC's output among other salient topics for kids like bullying, books, and personal problems.

In conjunction with the Children's subsite, the BBC also runs an online revision website using the Bitesize brand and also ran a message board for students. This latter service, now called "BBC Student Life" and previously called "Onion Street", was launched in 2001 and is aimed at young people between the ages of 11 and 16. The site offers a pre-moderated forum discussion on school work, revision and other areas of learning.

The BBC previously ran a page to help young people sort out their life difficulties entitled "Your Life". The page featured agony uncle "Ask Aaron", a professional psychotherapist who provided regular answers to children's questions across the message boards; after the page's closure, the agony uncle has moved on to Radio One's Sunday Surgery as their mental health expert.

There is integration between television output and website content with aspects of children's programming have follow-up information on their websites.

=== International-only site ===
An international BBC subsite named "BBC Britain" is only available to users with IP addresses outside the UK. UK users attempting to visit the site are told: "We're sorry but this site is not accessible from the UK as it is part of our international service and is not funded by the licence fee." Additional subsites exist which were initially inaccessible to UK users in the same manner as BBC Britain but have since been made accessible while displaying the following disclaimer: "This website is produced by BBC Global News Ltd, a commercial company owned by the BBC (and just the BBC). No money from the licence fee was used to create this website. The money we make from it is re-invested to help fund the BBC's international journalism." These subsites include:

- "Culture" which is a fusion of videos and images coupled with editorial content from a host of well-known and respected journalists and commentators, offering an alternative lens on global trends across the arts.
- "Future" which is universal topics focused on future trends in the worlds of science, technology, environment and health.
- "Worklife" (formerly Capital) which is dedicated to offering a global perspective on economic stories, trends and profiles on a personal level.
- "Autos" which is an entertaining, insightful daily read focused on the passionate side of the motor industry, including design, technology and community.
- "Earth" which is the website of the BBC International channel BBC Earth.
- "Travel" which is a site about all aspects of travel.
- "Reel" which has video features.

=== Former subsites ===
==== BBC Blast ====
BBC Blast was the BBC's network which encouraged teenagers to become creative in music, film, dance, art and fashion. It provided access to mentors online, and at free events and workshops across the UK. The website specifically catered for 13- to 19-year-olds but the BBC Blast project also ran a variety of work experience schemes for young adults between the ages of 18 and 25. Blast was running from 2002 until 2011. It included an online forum where participants could upload videos, audio tracks and images and comment on each other's work. There was an annual season on BBC2 where their films could be shown. The BBC Blast tour built partnerships with local arts organisations around the UK, featuring workshops and talks with stars from a variety of backgrounds, and providing a performance space for participants. These including rapper Akala, director and actor Noel Clarke, the artists Antony Gormley and Jake and Dinos Chapman, BBC Radio 1Xtra DJs Ace and Vis, singer-songwriter Jay Sean, rapper Chipmunk, Panjabi Hit Squad and Yngve & The Innocent. The tour also featured very early performances and interviews by artists such as Rizzle Kicks and Ed Sheeran.

Blast worked with a number of national partners to put on events and give teenagers' content a chance to be used at a higher level. These included the Victoria and Albert Museum, RSC, National Portrait Gallery, National Theatre, Zoo Nation, and the British Film Institute.

On 24 January 2011, the BBC announced the closure of BBC Blast as part of a 25% cut to the BBC Online budget, resulting in a £34 million shortfall.

==== Cult TV ====
From 1999 to 2005, the BBC ran a popular subsite called Cult TV. This subsite had news, star interviews, trivia, and other content popular with fans of the cult TV shows they covered. Examples of covered TV shows include The X-Files, Doctor Who, Buffy the Vampire Slayer, Farscape and The Hitchhiker's Guide to the Galaxy.

On 15 July 2005, the BBC announced that the site was closing as of the end of the month, although the Doctor Who section would be unaffected as the series was an ongoing BBC concern. The announcement explained that this was "part of the restructuring of the BBC's online activities". It was promised that some of the content would be moved to new places on bbc.co.uk, although as of January 2017 it is currently still all online at the no-longer-updated Cult site. In recent years, some of the content covered in the Cult section was included in the BBC's Archive section, such as content and information on the 25th Anniversary of Children's BBC.

==== BBC Guide to Comedy ====
The BBC Guide to Comedy was an online encyclopaedia based on Mark Lewisohn's 1998 book The Radio Times Guide to Comedy. It offered "Info on every TV comedy shown in the UK, from 1936 to today..." and featured articles on almost every comedy programme and sitcom produced by the main channels in the United Kingdom. The site also featured video clips, viewable in RealPlayer, and a small gallery of cast photographs or screenshots. It was replaced by a smaller, less detailed guide in 2007, which only focussed on BBC shows and is also now discontinued.

==== Democracy Live ====
Democracy Live was a subsite of the BBC that contains live streams and recorded programmes from deciding bodies that affect the UK. Launched in November 2009, the site focused around live and recorded debate from the House of Commons and the House of Lords in Westminster, the Scottish Parliament, the National Assembly for Wales, the Northern Ireland Assembly and the European Parliament. While recordings tended to focus on the main debating chambers, the site also hosted video from some committees. The site also included a search facility to find relevant debate, a tool to follow a particular member and see videos of their contributions and other videos of historic events from these institutions. The service also allowed the translation of Welsh Assembly proceedings to and from Welsh. Most of its services are now covered by the Freeview/BBC iPlayer channels BBC Parliament and its website (bbc.co.uk/tv/bbcparliament).

== Funding ==
The BBC's site was initially entirely free from advertising; this was due to the BBC's funding being derived primarily from compulsory television licence fees from UK viewers. BBC Studios who exploit BBC brands commercially have had several attempts at launching services online including Beeb.com in the late 1990s.

In 2006, the BBC began making controversial plans to raise revenue by including advertising on the international version of BBC News Online accessed from outside the United Kingdom. BBC Online is currently freely available worldwide (via various URLs including bbc.com/news) but planned video services and a lower than expected licence fee settlement paid for by UK residents only led to the BBC introducing banner advertisements to the site from November 2007. The BBC Trust approved the plans for introducing advertisements which also involved creating bbc.com as a part of BBC Worldwide. Sir Michael Lyons, Chairman of the Trust, confirmed the BBC would not charge for online news following News International's planned introduction of charges for online content.

Prior to this there had been criticism from some, as web users outside the UK could use the services (including the entire BBC radio services) without having to pay for them. In addition, where rights to sporting events (such as certain football or cricket matches) do not include international online coverage, users from outside the UK are blocked from listening to commentaries.

On 24 January 2011, it was announced that the BBC was to cut its online budget by 25% or £34 million. To cope with this, many BBC websites would be closed including BBC Switch, BBC Blast, 6-0-6, BBC raw, Video Nation, and planned to sell the Douglas Adams created website h2g2, as well as the automation of many programme websites and radio websites.

== Technical details ==
=== Streaming media ===
A service, called BBC iPlayer, was launched in December 2007, which allows users to download both radio and TV content for up to seven days after broadcast. The television version allows users to either stream programmes or to download them using peer-to-peer and DRM technology.

Initially streams were generally broadcast in the RealAudio and RealVideo formats controlled by RealNetworks and the BBC drew criticism with some for using those closed formats which, at the time, could only be played using RealPlayer. In response to such criticisms, the BBC negotiated a deal with RealNetworks a 'cut-down' version of RealPlayer which did not contain as much advertising and marketing.

Windows Media has also been adopted and since Autumn 2006, a Windows Media stream of all national BBC radio stations has been available.

More recently, the BBC has been experimenting with MP3 downloads and podcasting facilities for an increasing number of radio shows, with a high level of success; a less publicised trial of Ogg Vorbis streams for certain programmes was less successful, and has now been discontinued.

During major events, the BBC often features liveblogs which publish the most recent text and image posts from BBC correspondents; particularly significant political events may pair live blogs with live video streams or recorded video loops relevant to the event.

=== Message boards ===
In February 2001, BBC Online incorporated Douglas Adams' previously independent h2g2 project into its group of web sites, and eventually replaced all its existing message boards, which used an archaic system called Howerd, with the DNA software derived from that project. The site's now archived Collective magazine also used the DNA software along with numerous other sites created after the BBC's acquisition of h2g2.

=== Developers ===
The website has extensive technical information available about its operation. The BBC also made some of the content on bbc.co.uk and the BBC News Website available in XML format on the former developer network backstage.bbc.co.uk. Also, through participation in the Creative Archive Licence group, bbc.co.uk allows legal downloads of selected material via the Internet.

In November 2011, the BBC launched the Connected Studio initiative which resulted in the running of workshops for independent web designers to work with the BBC in conceiving new designs and ways for current BBC services to be improved.

=== Tracking cookies and privacy policy ===
BBC Online uses several third-party companies to log information from users, by means of cookies. The BBC lists the companies it uses in its privacy policy:

- 24/7 Real Media
- AOL Advertising
- Atlas Solutions (Microsoft Advertising)
- Audience Science
- Google DoubleClick
- Media Mind
- Specific Media
- Yahoo! Network Plus

=== Vulnerabilities ===
In March 2007, a vulnerability was exposed in the BBC's "Most Emailed" and "Most Read" news sections which could allow for the popularity of a news article to be exaggerated and thus highlight it to other website visitors.

== Graf report ==
In early 2004, the site was made the focus of a government review, launched by the Department for Culture, Media and Sport, led by Philip Graf. Sections of the UK Internet industry had argued that the BBC site offered things that were available in the commercial sector, creating unnecessary competition.

The review was published in July 2004 and it was recommended that the BBC "prioritise news, current affairs, education and information which is of value to the citizen." In response the BBC also shut down a small number of sections of the site, including the Soaps section.

In November 2004, the Governors of the BBC announced a newer, much more tightly drawn remit for bbc.co.uk as part of their response to the review. They also announced, as Graf had recommended, a new approach towards external providers which will see bbc.co.uk aiming to spend at least 25% of its eligible budget on content and services through independent commissions by the end of 2006/07.

The implementation of the Graf report has seen the popular message boards in the BBC Sport section shut down, as the BBC tries to promote its 606 brand, but these changes have proved unpopular as the interface has proven unusable and large numbers of content providers have abandoned the BBC site.

== See also ==
- BBC News Online
- Language education
- List of Language Self-Study Programs
