= PID =

PID or Pid may refer to:

== Medicine ==
- Pelvic inflammatory disease or pelvic inflammatory disorder, an infection of the upper part of the female reproductive system
- Primary immune deficiency, disorders in which part of the body's immune system is missing or does not function properly
- Prolapsed intervertebral disc, commonly called a herniated disc

== Science, technology and engineering ==
- BBC Programme Identifier, a unique identifier for a BBC television or radio programme brand, a season or series, or an individual episode
- OBD-II PIDs (on-board diagnostics parameter IDs), requests for data through an OBD connector in automotive repair
- Packet Identifier, a field in a MPEG transport stream packet
- Partial information decomposition, an extension of information theory
- Passive infrared detector, a passive infrared sensor
- Payload Interface Document (used on space engineering program for example)
- Persistent identifier, a long-lasting reference to a document, file, web page, or other object
- Phosphotyrosine-interacting domain, also known as phosphotyrosine-binding domain, a protein domain which bind to phosphotyrosine
- Photoionization detector, measures volatile organic compounds and other gases
- Physical Interface Device, a class of a USB device
- PID controller (proportional-integral-derivative controller), a control concept used in automation
- Piping and instrumentation diagram (P&ID), a diagram in the process industry which shows the piping of the process flow etc.
- Principal ideal domain, an algebraic structure
- Process identifier, a number used by many operating systems to identify a process

== Organisations ==
- Police Intelligence Department, a staff department of the Singapore Police Force
- Political Intelligence Department (disambiguation), multiple organisations
- Politieke Inlichtingen Dienst (Political Intelligence Department), was the main security agency for the Dutch East Indies
- Prague Integrated Transport (Pražská integrovaná doprava – PID in Czech), an integrated public transport system in Prague
- Press Information Department, government department of Bangladesh

== Other uses ==
- Pathways into Darkness, a 1993 video game by Bungie
- "Paul is dead", a 1960s urban legend that Paul McCartney was dead
- Pid (video game), a 2012 video game by Might and Delight
- Project Initiation Documentation, in project management
- Party identification, the political party with which an individual identifies
- Everett Pid Purdy (1904–1951), American athlete who played in both Major League Baseball and the National Football League
- P.I.D., Christian hip-hop group

== See also ==
- PIDS (disambiguation)
