= Pead =

Pead is an English surname. Notable people with this surname include:

- Craig Pead (born 1981), English football player
- Greg Pead, real name of Yahoo Serious
- Isaiah Pead (born 1989), American football player
- Jim Pead OBE (1924–2009), Australian politician
- Rod Pead, editor of Christian Order

== See also ==
- PEAD (disambiguation)
