= PEAD =

PEAD or variants could refer to:

- Post-earnings-announcement drift
- Presidential Emergency Action Documents
- Pead, a surname

== See also ==
- PED (disambiguation)
- PID (disambiguation)
