= Miles Jesu =

Catholic institute of consecrated life in Phoenix, Arizona

Miles Jesu is a Catholic institute of consecrated life founded on January 12, 1964, in Phoenix, Arizona, whose membership comprises lay people and clerics who take religious vows and in addition, since it is structured as an ecclesial family of consecrated life, it also has people in other states of life as members.

== History of Miles Jesu ==
The founder was the Spanish Claretian priest Alfonso María Durán, who was sent to the southwestern United States in 1958 and there propagated the Cursillo movement, which practices an intensive retreat that emphasizes the call of the laity to holiness and apostolate. A few young men who made such a retreat in Phoenix decided to dedicate their lives and secular careers to answering that call. Under Father Durán's guidance, they formed the first Miles Jesu community on January 12, 1964. In 1970, membership was opened to widows and, a few years later, to young unmarried women, with separate branches for men and women. Communities were established also in other countries from 1984 onward and the institute's general house was moved to Rome.

In 2004 complaints surfaced about the governance of Father Duran, who had been superior general since the foundation of Miles Jesu. The English Traditionalist Catholic publication Christian Order (which criticized the institute itself for celebrating Mass in the post-Vatican II form rather than in the Tridentine Mass form preferred by traditionalists, and for not sharing traditionalist views on the state of the Church) spoke of Father Durán as "a somewhat domineering figure".

In May 2007 the Vicariate of Rome, where the general house was situated, removed Father Durán from his post of superior general because of serious mental and physical health problems. At about the same time thirteen of the members requested an official investigation into Miles Jesu. This investigation began in June 2007. Carried out by Father Anthony McSweeney, SSS, it confirmed the existence of questionable conduct on the part of Father Durán, in addition to an erratic exercise of authority facilitated by instilling into the members an unhealthy sense of obedience that was not in accord with the discipline of the Catholic Church.

On 25 Mary 2009, Father Barry Fischer, CPPS, was appointed commissary to revise the practices and customs of Miles Jesu and to revise the constitution with the assistance of a council composed of members of the men's and the women's domus branches and in consultation with the whole membership.

== Community life ==
The members who take vows of poverty, chastity and obedience and live in community are called domus members (from the Latin for "house"). These are comparable to the "numerary" members of the Personal Prelature of Opus Dei. Priest members live in the celibate men's communities and serve the sacramental needs of the members of Miles Jesu. The communities of celibate women have their own houses.

Some domus members work in professions like the numeraries of Opus Dei, other domus members dedicate themselves to the various apostolates of Miles Jesu such as the "Path To Rome Conference Series", the cause of canonization of Queen Isabel the Catholic, or work to promote vocations to Miles Jesu.

Vinculum members (from the Latin for "bond" or "link") can be married, single or widowed. They do not take the religious vows of the domus members and do not live in these communities, but they are members of the Miles Jesu family.

== Presence in the world ==
It was reported in 2004 that there were 27 Miles Jesu houses in 14 countries. The latest (January 2012) information indicates that there are domus communities in 9 countries and vinculum members in an additional 3 countries. Domus communities are found in the following countries (with date of first foundation): United States (1964), India (1984), Spain (1985), Nigeria (1987), Italy (1988) Czech Republic (1990), Ukraine (1990), Poland (1991), and Slovakia (2004). The three additional countries are Puerto Rico, England and Austria.

The members in Ukraine belong to the Ukrainian Greek Catholic Church.

== Cause of canonization of Paul M. Murphy, MJ ==
Paul M. Murphy, one of the first members of Miles Jesu, professed the vows of poverty, chastity, and obedience on December 25, 1966. His cause for canonization was commenced after his death.

== Cause of canonization of Queen Isabel the Catholic ==
One of Miles Jesu's activities is the promotion of the cause of canonization of Isabella I of Castile, the Catholic monarch who is known for her expulsion of the Jews in 1492 with her issuance of the Alhambra Decree. Father Durán defended her action in his article, "Queen Isabel and the Jews", stating: "That Queen Isabel did not act out of any anti-semitic, racial or religious hatred or bigotry can be firmly substantiated by her unequivocal condemnations of, and personal interventions to stop riots and acts of violence against Jews even before her formal accession to the throne, and sometimes at the loss of support of wealthy and influential partisans. Isabel consistently showed favoritism toward the Jews"; and adding: "Another very important factor in the expulsion was the menace of the Muslims. Spain was a Christian country invaded by the Muslims in 711 with the help of the Jews. This defeat was looked upon by the Spanish as a temporary situation. …The reconquest was the permanent historical project of Spain, which was Christian and European."

The "Queen Isabel the Catholic" website calls Queen Isabel "a great woman", specifying: "When we talk here of greatness, we specifically mean impact on history, and we judge this by the fruit borne. We do not mean ‘holiness’, for while Isabel certainly lead a saintly life, the question of who, after the Mother of God, is the holiest woman in history, is one we cannot even begin to answer. The field is very crowded!"

== See also ==
- Consecrated life
- Opus Dei
- Legion of Christ
