= TV-Anytime =

TV-Anytime is a set of specifications for the controlled delivery of multimedia content to a user's local storage. It seeks to exploit the evolution in convenient, high capacity storage of digital information to provide consumers with a highly personalized TV experience. Users will have access to content from a wide variety of sources, tailored to their needs and personal preferences. TV-Anytime specifications are specified by the TV-Anytime Forum.

== The TV-Anytime Forum ==
The global TV-Anytime Forum is an association of organizations which seeks to develop specifications to enable audio-visual and other services based on mass-market high volume digital storage in consumer platforms.

It was formed in Newport Beach, California, United States, on 27–29 September 1999 after DAVIC was closed down. It was wound up on 27 July 2005 following the publication of RFC 4078 (reference: http://www.tv-anytime.org/).

Its first specifications were published by the European Telecommunications Standards Institute (ETSI) on August 1, 2003 as TS 102 822-1 'Broadcast and On-line Services: Search, select, and rightful use of content on personal storage systems ("TV-Anytime")'. RFC 4078 (The TV-Anytime Content Reference Identifier (CRID)) was published in May 2005.

TV-Anytime has more than 60 member companies from Europe (including BBC, BSkyB, Canal+ Technologies, Disney, EBU, Nederlands Omroep Productie Bedrijf (NOB), France Telecom, Nokia, Philips, PTT Research , Thomson), Asia (including ETRI, KETI, NHK, NTT, Dentsu, Hakuhodo, Nippon TV, Sony, Panasonic, LG, Samsung, Sharp, Toshiba) and the USA (including Motorola, Microsoft, and Nielsen).

== The objectives ==
The TV-Anytime Forum has set up the following four objectives for their standardization work:

1. Develop specifications that will enable applications to exploit local persistent storage in consumer electronics platforms.
2. Be network independent with regard to the means for content delivery to consumer electronics equipment, including various delivery mechanisms (e.g. ATSC, DVB, DBS and others) and the Internet and enhanced TV.
3. Develop specifications for interoperable and integrated systems, from content creators/providers, through service providers, to the consumers.
4. Specify the necessary security structures to protect the interests of all parties involved.

== Current status ==
Several implementations of the TV-Anytime specifications exist among broadcasters, EPG operators, press guide printers, etc. Early implementations have been done in the field of metadata aggregation. More is coming in the field of hybrid broadcast-broadband delivery.

A licensing program for TV-Anytime was managed by Via Licensing Corporation until early December 2010. More information on known patents of the defunct licensing programme's patent holders, claimed to be essential, is provided on the new TV-Anytime website now officially hosted by EBU.

== See also ==
- backstage.bbc.co.uk
- CRID
