= Pids =

PIDS may refer to:

- BBC Programme Identifiers
- Passenger Information Display System
- Perimeter intrusion detection system
- Philippine Institute for Development Studies
- Protocol-based intrusion detection system
