= BBC Genome Project =

BBC database of programme listings

Logo of the BBC Genome Project

The BBC Genome Project is an online searchable database of programme listings initially based upon the contents of the Radio Times from the first issue in 1923 to 2009. Television listings from post-2009 can be accessed via the BBC Programmes site.

== History ==
=== Prior ===
BBC Genome is not the BBC's first online searchable database. In April 2006, they gave the public access to Infax – their only electronic programme database at the time. It contained around 900,000 entries but not every programme ever broadcast, and it ceased operation in December 2007. The front page of the website is still available to see via the Internet Archive. After Infax ceased, a message on the website said that it would be incorporating in the information into individual programme pages. In 2012, Infax was replaced by the database Fabric but this is only for internal use within the BBC.

=== Radio Times ===
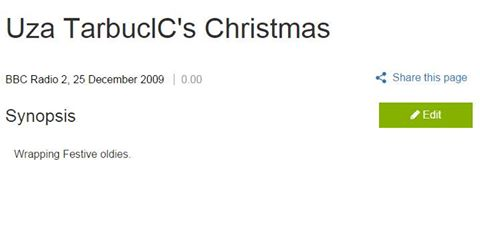
Screenshot of an OCR error (since corrected) in Genome. The text, "Uza TarbuclC's Christmas", should read "Liza Tarbuck's Christmas".

In December 2012, the BBC completed a digitisation exercise, scanning the listings from Radio Times of all BBC's programmes from 1923 to 2009 from an entire run of about 4,500 copies of the magazine. They identified around five million programmes involving 8.5 million actors, presenters, writers and technical staff. BBC Genome was released for public use on 15 October 2014.

The listings are as published in advance, and so do not include late changes or cancellations which were reflected on Infax. However, they do include huge numbers of early radio and television broadcasts, and "DJ shows" from BBC Radio 1 and BBC Radio 2 which were rarely kept officially, which were not listed on Infax (which also did not usually include repeats of archived programmes prior to 1976) because they were not in the BBC archives. The issues were scanned at high resolution, producing TIFF images and optical character recognition was then used to turn the text from the page into searchable text on the Genome database.

The aim of this project is to allow researchers to be able to find out information easier and to help BBC Archives to build up a picture of what exists and what is currently missing from the archive. Corrections to OCR errors and changes to advertised schedules are being crowdsourced, with over 440,910 user generated edits accepted after editorial review as of mid-December 2018. Each listing entry has a unique identifier which may be expressed as a URL. For example, the first screening of Doctor Who is bbc.co.uk. A broadcast programme may have more than one such identifier, if it was broadcast (and thus listed) on repeat occasions, or in different regions.

==== Other content ====
Digitised editions of entire magazines (including front covers, prose articles, advertisements, and other non-listings content) from the 1920s were added in March 2017; for the 1930s in December 2017; for the 1940s in December 2018; and for the 1950s in December 2019.

==== Missing listings ====
Issue date	Reason
14 May 1926	General strike
21 February 1947	Fuel crisis
28 February 1947	Fuel crisis
8 September 1950	Printing dispute
13 October 1950	Printing dispute
20 October 1950	Printing dispute
27 October 1950	Printing dispute
1 August 1981	Printing dispute
2 April 1983	Printing dispute
9 April 1983	Printing dispute
3 December 1983	Printing dispute

== See also ==
- BBC Archives
- BBC Programme Catalogue
- Timeline of the BBC
