= BBC Archives =

British Broadcasting Corporation department

- BBC Archives
- Native name: BBC Archives
- Country of origin: United Kingdom
- Owner: BBC

The BBC Archives are collections documenting the BBC's broadcasting history, including copies of television and radio broadcasts, internal documents, photographs, online content, sheet music, commercially available music, BBC products (including toys, games, merchandise, books, publications, and programme releases on VHS, Beta, Laserdisc, DVD, vinyl, audio cassette, audio book CD, and Blu-ray), press cuttings, artefacts and historic equipment. The original contents of the collections are permanently retained, but are in the process of being digitised. Some collections have been uploaded to the BBC Archives section of the BBC Online website for visitors to view. The archive is one of the largest broadcast archives in the world, with over 15 million items.

== Overview ==
The BBC Archives encompass numerous collections containing materials produced and acquired by the BBC. The earliest material dates back to 1890. The archives contain 15 million items on 60 miles of shelving spread over several sites, and include approximately 1 million hours of playable media. Items are managed using a bar code system for locating stored items and tracking items that have been lent out. The BBC says that the budget for managing, protecting and digitising the archive accounts for only a small part of its overall budget.

The BBC is engaging in an ongoing project to digitise and preserve their entire archived programme material, migrating (transferring) recordings made on older analogue formats such as film, audio tape, videotape, vinyl, wax cylinders etc. on to today's latest electronic formats as digital files, which are compatible with modern computer hardware and software equipment and systems. The BBC Archives are constantly preserving, cataloguing and digitising its physical formats in order to safeguard material that is physically deteriorating for the future. Their aim is to eventually create a complete digital archive where they no longer have to use now obsolete media formats and their respective equipment. The BBC can instead then continue to preserve original master material in their secure vaults. The BBC Archives have contingencies in place when digitising material so that digitised copies are not accidentally overwritten, encrypted, deleted, incorrectly catalogued, incorrectly labelled, and no more than one copy of each (other than various back up spare copies and other copies at various different sites) is digitised into the BBC Digital Archives.

Much of the audio-visual material was originally recorded on formats which are now obsolete and incompatible with modern broadcast equipment due to the fact that the machines used to reproduce many formats are no longer being manufactured. Additionally, some film and audio formats are slowly disintegrating, and digitisation also serves as a digital preservation programme.

The BBC Archive website was relaunched online in 2008 and has provided newly released historical material regularly since then. The BBC works in partnership with the British Film Institute (BFI), The National Archives and other partners in working with and using the materials.

In 2012, BBC Archive Development produced a book - primarily aimed as BBC staff - titled 'BBC Archive Collections: What's In The Archive And How To Use Them'. This book describes the BBC's archive collections and offers guidance around on how items from the collections can be reused online.

== Buildings ==
From 1963 to 2010, the majority of television material of nationally networked programmes in the BBC Archive were housed at the archive centre in Windmill Road, Brentford, in west London. Television programmes were also stored by the Open University in Milton Keynes, and by BBC nations and regional libraries around the country. In the late 1990s, and early in the 2000s material from the radio side of the BBC were also stored on the site. The condition of the three Windmill Road buildings deteriorated over the years and suffered occasional flooding incidents, and eventually the archive was relocated to a new centre at Perivale Park, Perivale, three miles north of the old site. The new BBC Archive Centre was opened in Summer 2010 and all material was successfully moved by March 2011.

Material is stored in thirteen vaults, controlled to match the best climate for the material inside them, and named after a different BBC personality depending on the content contained in them. In addition to the vaults, new editing, preservation and workrooms have been added so that the material can easily be transferred between formats as well as viewed, restored and digitised for future posterity. The building has also been fitted with fire suppression systems to protect the archive in the event of an incident at the centre, so the total loss of the archive is avoided.

As of April 2019, the BBC Archives employ around 200 staff, most of whom are based at the Archive Centre in Perivale.

== Television Archive ==
The BBC Television Archive contains over 1.5 million tape items as well as over 600,000 cans of film material. The archive itself holds extensive material from approximately the mid-1970s onwards, when important recordings at the broadcaster were retained for the future.

Recordings from before this date are less comprehensively preserved; the process of telerecording was originally invented in 1947 while videotape recording was gradually introduced from the late 1950s onwards, but due to the expense of the tapes, recording was seen for production use only with recordings subsequently being lost. or telerecordings being junked. The exceptions in the early years were usually occasions of great importance, such as the coronation of Queen Elizabeth II. In addition, numerous programmes at the time were broadcast 'live' and so utilised no recording procedure in the production process. The earliest item in the collection is from 1936.

Today, the majority of programmes are kept, including news, entertainment, drama and a selection of other long-running programmes such as quiz shows. The remaining material from the television archive is offered to the British Film Institute prior to being disposed of.

== Sound Archive ==
The BBC Sound Archive contains the archived output from the BBC's radio output. Widespread recordings exist in the archive from the mid-1930s, when recording of programmes and speeches were kept for rebroadcast; the catalyst for this was the launch of the BBC Empire Service in 1932 and the subsequent rebroadcast of speeches from political leaders at a time convenient in the different time zones. Prior to this, the broadcast of recordings was seen as being false to the listener and was avoided.

Any recordings made were frequently disposed of and it was the efforts of Marie Slocombe, who founded the Sound Archive in 1937 when she retained recordings of prominent figures in the country, that the archive became into being officially when she was appointed the Sounds Recording Librarian in 1941.

Today, all of the BBC's radio output is recorded for re-use, with approximately 66% of output being preserved in the Archives; programmes involving guests or live performances from artists are kept, whereas programmes in which the DJ plays commercially available music are only sampled and not kept entirely. Prior to any material being disposed of, the material is offered to the British Library Sound Archive.

The archive consists of multiple formats including wax cylinders, numerous gramophone records made from both shellac and vinyl, as well as numerous more recordings on tape, CD and on digital audio tape (DAT). The difficulty of these different formats is the availability of the machines required to play them; some of the records in the archive are 16 inches in diameter and require large phonograph units to play, while the players for the wax cylinders and DATs are no longer in production. There are also 700,000 vinyl records, 180,000 78 rpm records, 400,000 LP records and 350,000 CDs in the archive.

The Radio Digital Archive has been capturing radio programmes as broadcast quality wav files since 2008, with over 1.5 million recordings, a number growing daily.

Some of the wax cylinder collection has been donated to the British Library.

The Sound Archive is based at the BBC Archive Centre in Perivale, along with the television archive, and was previously based at Windmill Road, Brentford.

== Written Archives ==
The BBC Written Archives contain all the internal written documents and communications from the corporation from the launch in 1922 to the present day. Its collections shed light into the behind the scenes workings of the corporation and also elaborate on the difficulties of getting a television or radio programme to or off the air as the case may be. The archive guidelines state that access to files post-1980 is restricted due to the current nature of the files; the general exception to this rule are documents such as scripts and Programme as Broadcast records.

The Written Archives are located at the BBC Written Archives Centre in Caversham, Berkshire, near Reading. The centre houses the archive on four and a half miles of shelving along with reading rooms. The centre is different from the other BBC Archives in that the centre opens for writers and academic researchers in higher education.

== Photographic Library ==
The BBC Photographic Library is responsible for approximately 7 million images, dating back to 1922, created for publicity purposes and subsequently kept for future use. In addition to programme promotion, a large number of images are of historic events which are often incorporate into the daily news bulletins; as a result, half the photographic library team work specifically with these images. The images themselves are kept as originals in the archive, with digitisation only utilised when a specific image is required for use, when the image is sent in a digital format. Copies of images are also used in case any images are damaged due to vinegar syndrome and other issues.

The most requested images from the Archive include Colin Firth in Pride and Prejudice, Michael Parkinson interviewing Muhammad Ali, Martin Bashir interviewing Diana, Princess of Wales and a picture of Delia Derbyshire at work in the Radiophonic workshop at the BBC.

== Archive Treasure Hunt ==
At the turn of the millennium, the BBC launched the BBC Archive Treasure Hunt, a public appeal to recover pre-1980s lost BBC radio and television productions. Original material of many programmes was lost due to the practice of discarding recordings because of the need to reduce costs, copyright issues and for technical reasons.

The resolution of this appeal was that over one hundred productions were recovered including The Men from the Ministry, Something To Shout About, Man and Superman, The Doctor's Dilemma, I'm Sorry, I'll Read That Again, Hancock's Half Hour, I'm Sorry, I Haven't A Clue, and The Ronnie Corbett Thing in addition to recording sessions with Elton John, Ringo Starr and Paul Simon. In addition, the Peter Sellers Estate Collection donated numerous recordings featuring Peter Sellers.

== Creative Archive Licence ==
The BBC together with the British Film Institute, the Open University, Channel 4 and Teachers' TV formed a collaboration, named the Creative Archive Licence Group, to create a copyright licence for the re-release of archived material.

The Licence was a trial, launched in 2005, and notable for the re-release of part of the BBC News' archive and programmes made by the BBC Natural History Unit for creative use by the public. While artists and teachers were encouraged to use the content to create works of their own, the terms of the licence were restrictive compared to copyleft licences. Use of Creative Archive content for commercial, "endorsement, campaigning, defamatory or derogatory purposes" was forbidden, any derivative works were to be released under the same licence, and content was only to be used within the UK. The trial ended in 2006 following a review by the BBC Trust and works released under the licence were withdrawn.

== Voices from the Archives ==
Voices from the Archives was a former BBC project, launched in partnership with BBC Four that provided free access to audio interviews with various notable people and professions from a variety of political, religious and social backgrounds. The website ceased to be updated in June 2005, and the concept was instead adopted by BBC Radio 4 as a collection of film interviews from various programmes.

== Heritage Collection ==
Previous Archives logo

The BBC Heritage Collection is the newest of the BBC Archives and holds historic broadcast technology, art, props and merchandise. The collection was created out of personal collections and bequeaths by former staff members, as the BBC had no formal policy on the heritage collection until c.2003.

The collection includes, amongst other items, the BBC One Noddy Globe and clock, a BBC-Marconi Type A microphone, an early crystal radio made by the British Broadcasting Company, a Marconi/EMI camera used in the early BBC Television experiments, a BBC Micro computer and a selection of items used to create Foley effects on soundtracks. In addition to all the broadcast technology, art is also kept, namely the portraits of all the BBC Director Generals, as well as props including an original TARDIS from Doctor Who and the children's television puppet Gordon the Gopher.

The heritage collection itself has no single permanent home, as the majority of objects are on display, either around BBC properties or on loan to museums or other collections; the most significant museum housing the collection is the National Science and Media Museum in Bradford.

== Programme Catalogue ==
Over the years, the BBC has used various programme catalogue databases to keep a record of the programmes in the archives. Internal databases include Infax and Fabric, and publicly accessible databases include BBC Genome and BBC Programmes.

== See also ==
- BBC Genome Project
- Dad's Army missing episodes
- Doctor Who missing episodes
- Film preservation
- Lost film
- Missing Believed Wiped
- Telerecording
- Timeline of the BBC
