= Austin Pettis =

American football player (born 1989)

No. 18
- Position: Wide receiver

Personal information
- Born: February 8, 1989 (age 37); Anaheim, California, U.S.
- Listed height: 6 ft 3 in (1.91 m)
- Listed weight: 203 lb (92 kg)

Career information
- High school: Lutheran (Orange, California)
- College: Boise State (2007–2010)
- NFL draft: 2011: 3rd round, 78th overall pick

Career history
- St. Louis Rams (2011–2014); San Diego Chargers (2015)*
- * Offseason or practice squad member only

Awards and highlights
- 2× First-team All-WAC (2009, 2010); Second-team All-WAC (2008)

Career NFL statistics
- Receptions: 107
- Receiving yards: 1,034
- Receiving touchdowns: 9
- Stats at Pro Football Reference

Austin Pettis (born February 8, 1989) is an American former professional football player who was a wide receiver for the St. Louis Rams of the National Football League (NFL). He played college football for the Boise State Broncos and was selected by the Rams in the third round of the 2011 NFL draft.

== Early life ==
Pettis attended Orange Lutheran High School in Orange, California. He was part of the football team and had 72 receptions for 1,079 yards and 13 touchdowns as a senior. He was named First-team All-league and All-county and Third-team All-state and was also named to the All-Southern Section Team while helping team to state championship. As a sophomore, he was named Second-team All-league as well as being named top sophomore on team. He lettered in football three times, basketball three times, and track and field twice.

== College career ==
Pettis finished his Boise State career as the school's all-time leader in both receptions (229) and touchdown catches (39). His 2,838 receiving yards rank second on the all-time list. He was a four-year starter in the Broncos' high-powered offense. Pettis set career highs with 71 receptions and 951 yards and 10 touchdowns as a senior and earned First-team All-Western Athletic Conference honors for the second consecutive year.

As a junior, in 2009, Pettis had 63 receptions for 855 yards and 14 touchdowns and was a First-team All-WAC selection. Pettis was named Second-team All-WAC after his sophomore season (2007), catching 49 passes for 567 yards, averaging 11.6 yards per catch and nine touchdowns. He was also named to the All-WAC academic team. In 2007 as a true freshmen, he finished season second on team with 46 receptions and finished second on team with six touchdown receptions and third with 465 yards receiving.

== Professional career ==
Pre-draft measurables
| Height | Weight | Arm length | Hand span | Wingspan | 40-yard dash | 10-yard split | 20-yard split | 20-yard shuttle | Three-cone drill | Vertical jump | Broad jump | Bench press |
|---|---|---|---|---|---|---|---|---|---|---|---|---|
| 6 ft 2 5/8 in (1.90 m) | 209 lb (95 kg) | 31 3/4 in (0.81 m) | 9 3/4 in (0.25 m) | 6 ft 4 in (1.93 m) | 4.62 s | 1.60 s | 2.65 s | 3.88 s | 6.68 s | 33.5 in (0.85 m) | 10 ft 0 in (3.05 m) | 14 reps |
All values from NFL Combine

At the 2011 NFL Combine, Pettis ran the shuttle in 3.88 seconds, fastest among the receivers at the combine. Pettis also finished sixth in the 60-yard shuttle (11.14 seconds) and 11th in the three-cone drill (6.68 seconds).

Pettis was drafted in the third round with the 78th overall pick in the 2011 NFL draft by the St. Louis Rams. On July 29, 2011, Pettis signed a four-year contract with the Rams that included a $614,000 signing bonus. In a week seven loss against the Green Bay Packers in 2012, Pettis caught his first NFL touchdown pass, a three-yard reception. He was waived on October 20, 2014.

Pettis was signed by the San Diego Chargers on January 9, 2015. He was released by the team on September 5, 2015.

=== NFL statistics ===
Receiving statistics

| Year | Team | Games | Receptions | Yards | Average yards per reception | Longest reception | Touchdowns | Fumbles | Fumbles lost |
|---|---|---|---|---|---|---|---|---|---|
| 2011 | STL | 12 | 27 | 256 | 9.5 | 35 | 0 | 0 | 0 |
| 2012 | STL | 14 | 30 | 261 | 8.7 | 36 | 4 | 0 | 0 |
| 2013 | STL | 16 | 38 | 399 | 10.5 | 31T | 4 | 1 | 0 |
| 2014 | STL | 5 | 12 | 118 | 9.8 | 27 | 1 | 0 | 0 |
| Total | Total | 47 | 107 | 1,034 | 9.6 | 36 | 9 | 1 | 0 |

Returning statistics

| Year | Team | Games | Punt returns | Punt return yards | Punts returned for touchdowns | Fair catches | Longest punt return | Kickoff returns | Kickoff return yards | Kickoff return touchdowns | Fair catches | Longest kickoff return |
|---|---|---|---|---|---|---|---|---|---|---|---|---|
| 2011 | STL | 12 | 15 | 139 | 0 | 10 | 39 | 3 | 62 | 0 | 0 | 24 |
| 2012 | STL | 14 | 11 | 77 | 0 | 9 | 23 | 1 | 13 | 0 | 0 | 13 |
| 2013 | STL | 16 | 2 | 37 | 0 | 0 | 32 | 0 | 0 | 0 | 0 | 0 |
| 2014 | STL | 5 | 1 | 1 | 0 | 0 | 1 | 0 | 0 | 0 | 0 | 0 |
| Total | Total | 47 | 29 | 254 | 0 | 19 | 39 | 4 | 75 | 0 | 0 | 24 |

== Personal life ==
Pettis is the grandson of former Major League Baseball player Del Rice and nephew of Gary Pettis. His cousins are actor Kyler Pettis and wide receiver Dante Pettis.
