= Backstage.bbc.co.uk =

BBC developer network

backstage.bbc.co.uk
- Type: online
- Country: United Kingdom
- Availability: International
- Motto: "use our stuff to build your stuff"
- Owner: BBC
- Key people: Ian Forrester, Matthew Cashmore, Ben Metcalfe
- Launch date: 11 May 2005
- Former names: BBC Backstage, Welcomebackstage.com
- Official website: www.bbc.co.uk/blogs/bbcbackstage

backstage.bbc.co.uk is the brand name (and URL) of the BBC's developer network which operated between May 2005 and December 2010.

== Purpose ==
Launched partly as a response to the Graf Review of bbc.co.uk, the aims of backstage.bbc.co.uk are to encourage innovation and creativity in the UK, and to identify new talent. According to the BBC's response to the Graf report, the site aims to

support social innovation by encouraging users’ efforts to build sites and projects that meet their needs and those of their communities ... The BBC will also be committed to using open standards that will enable users to find and re-purpose BBC content in more flexible ways

Site homepage

== History ==
backstage.bbc.co.uk was created by Tom Loosemore, Ben Metcalfe and James Boardwell. It was piloted internally within the BBC in the Spring of 2005, then launched on 11 May 2005. Its aim was to encourage innovative use of the content across bbc.co.uk, including the BBC News website, by third-party developers.

The website came out of beta as an official site on 23 July 2005 at the backstage.bbc.co.uk OpenTech event which was organised by NTK and the UK Unix Users Group. It is sometimes referred to as BBC Backstage, although the official title of the project is backstage.bbc.co.uk.

The BBC admit that in the past they had not always welcomed amateur innovators who attempted to reuse BBC content, but through the backstage site they aimed to foster a dialogue with such developers and the wider community. This was essential as the BBC launched a video player online and the same community voiced their concerns. A peaceful DRM protest in February 2007 took place in London and Manchester by Defective by Design, BBC Backstage kept the dialogue open in their public mailing list and later in the first of many podcasts.

In July 2006, backstage.bbc.co.uk won the New Statesman New Media Innovation award.

In December 2010, the project was closed. An ebook retrospective was created to mark the end.

== Feeds ==
XML feeds are available on the backstage website for people to build with on a non-commercial basis. A complete list of the feeds available can be found on the site, but they include RSS from the BBC News Website, TV listings (in TV-Anytime format) and travel delay data. The BBC's RSS feeds, which are a main component of their backstage philosophy, output around 500 unique pieces of news each and every day from its network of over 5000 journalists.

== Events ==
In June 2007, backstage.bbc.co.uk and Yahoo! hosted a weekend Hack Day in North London's Alexandra Palace for several hundred developers and designers followed by a performance by The Rumble Strips. The event was hit by lightning on the Saturday morning.

Also in 2007, backstage.co.uk hosted the TV Unfestival at the International Television Festival in Edinburgh.

backstage.bbc.co.uk is currently part of BBC Research & Development. The department headed up by Matthew Postgate. The senior producer is Ian Forrester and development producer role is open. Matthew Cashmore used to be developer producer at backstage but now works for Lonely Planet, and Rain Ashford who now works for another BBC project in Media Literacy.

In April 2008, backstage.bbc.co.uk held a new event (based on the Yahoo! concept - Hack Day) called Over the Air at Imperial College which was based around mobile development and ideas.

In June 2008, backstage.bbc.co.uk held another event (based on the Yahoo! concept - Hack Day) called Mashed at Alexandra Palace in North London.
