= BBC Programme Catalogue =

Online archive of the entire BBC back catalogue of TV and radio programmes

The BBC Programme Catalogue is an online archive of the entire BBC back catalogue of TV and radio programmes. The catalogue is for internal use by the BBC although for a time a beta online version was available to the public. The catalogue is not "a complete record of every BBC programme" since certain categories of programme were not catalogued or no longer exist.

The catalogue does not include entries for programmes where no copies of the programme are known to still exist. Nor does it include entries for sport because the BBC does not necessarily own the rights. However every individual news item is separately catalogued since these had a high re-use value (e.g. use of archive footage of historical news items within present-day news programmes or documentaries).

== History ==
=== Internal ===
==== Infax ====
Infax was the BBC's programme database, containing 966,244 BBC programmes dating back to 1938; however, this is not every programme ever broadcast. Since 1992, Infax has only been used as a stock control system. Infax catalogued all TV and selected radio until 2008, but was only used to catalogue news up until 1994. The Star catalogue was used to catalogue news from 1994 to 2008. In 2004, the Sports Library database took over cataloguing sport until 2008 when sport was taken over by the Digital Library database.

It was reported that Infax was due to be switched off in March 2014, but due to technical issues with Fabric, it remains operational at a cost of £780,000 a year to maintain.

==== Strix/Cinegy ====
From 1992, the BBC Northern Ireland Archive used Strix to catalogue factual, sport, current affairs, entertainment programmes and news output until March 2009. As of April 2009, all news was catalogued and stored using the Cinegy database. The Cinegy database allows for video material to be viewed on a BBC desktop computer.

==== Fabric ====
In 2012, a new programme archive database was introduced to replace Infax at a cost of £3m a year. In 2013, Fabric failed a number of times and the BBC has identified key limitations with the database. Again in 2014, the BBC's internal Ariel newspaper reported that Fabric has had a series of fixes, but the feedback was mixed, and Infax will continue to operate. In an interview for Ariel, Maggie Lydon (Head of Media Management) insists that only 'a very small amount' of information has not been transferred from Infax to Fabric.

=== Public ===
==== Infax ====
A web version of this database was made available to access to the public in April 2006. It ceased operation in December 2007. The front page of the website is still available to see via the Internet Archive. After it ceased, a message on the website said that it would be incorporating the information into individual programme pages.

However, in 2009, an email reply from the BBC showed that the reason for its removal was due to a data protection concern.

Infax was also incorporated into the BBC Motion Gallery website (now Getty Images). In mid 2014, a data protection issue was flagged and public access was disabled.

As of October 2012, a version of the BBC programme catalogue is available to view exclusively in British Library in the St Pancras (London) and Boston Spa (Yorkshire) reading rooms. 2.2 million searchable catalogue records and 225,000 programmes up to June 2012 are available to view.

==== Genome Project ====
BBC Genome Logo

BBC Genome Project is a digitised online searchable database of back issues of the Radio Times from 1923 to 2009. The information in the database will be linked up with the video and audio files that the BBC have archived, and from this the BBC will be able to work out what is still missing from the archive.

TV listings post-2009 can be accessed via the BBC Programmes site.

==== BBC Programme Index ====
This database contains the BBC's TV and Radio listings from 1923 to the present day. The data is taken from two sources: information from BBC iPlayer and BBC Sounds pages (referred to as “Programme Information Platform or PIPs”) and data from BBC Genome. There are millions of listings on the BBC's Programme Index. Some will link through to programmes you can watch and listen but most of the listings remain text-only. Listings contain at least a programme title, broadcast channel and transmission time, but some listings also contain programme summary and contributor details.

== See also ==
- BBC Archives
- BBC Genome Project
- BBC Programme Identifier
