= Content reference identifier =

A content reference identifier, or CRID, is a Uniform Resource Identifier scheme, resulting from standardization work by the TV-Anytime forum. It is or closely matches the concept of HTTP-based Uniform Resource Locators (URLs):

== Concept ==
A unit of content, in a broadcast stream, can be referred to by its globally unique CRID in the same way that a webpage can be referred to by its globally unique URL on the web.

The concept of CRID permits referencing contents unambiguously, regardless of their location, i.e., without knowing specific broadcast information (time, date and channel) or how to obtain them through a network, for instance, by means of a streaming service or by downloading a file from an Internet server.

The receiver must be capable of resolving these unambiguous references, i.e. of translating them into specific data that will allow it to obtain the location of that content in order to acquire it. This makes it possible for recording processes to take place without knowing that information, and even without knowing beforehand the duration of the content to be recorded: a complete series by a simple click, a program that has not been scheduled yet, a set of programs grouped by a specific criterion...

This framework allows for the separation between the reference to a given content (the CRID) and the necessary information to acquire it, which is called a “locator”. Each CRID may lead to one or more locators which will represent different copies of the same content. They may be identical copies broadcast in different channels or dates, or cost different prices. They may also be distinct copies with different technical parameters such as format or quality.

It may also be the case that the resolution process of a CRID provides another CRID as a result (for example, its reference in a different network, where it has an alternative identifier assigned by a different operator) or a set of CRIDs (for instance, if the original CRID represents a TV series, in which case the resolution process would result in the list of CRIDs representing each episode).

From the above it can be concluded that provided that a given content can belong to many groups (each possibly defined by distinctive qualities), it is possible that many CRIDs carry the same content. That is, several CRIDs may be resolved into the same locator.

A CRID is not exactly a universal, unique and exclusive identifier for a given content. It is closely related to the authority that creates it, to the resolution service provider, and to the content provider in such a way that the same content may have different CRIDs depending on the field in which they are used (for example, a different one for each television operator that has the rights to broadcast the content).

== Format ==
A CRID-based URL is specified much like an HTTP-based URL. Typically, the content creator, the broadcaster or a third party will use their DNS-based domain names in a combination with a product-specific name to create globally unique CRIDs. That is, the syntax of a CRID is:

crid://authority/data

The authority field represents the entity that created the CRID and its format is that of a DNS name. The data field represents a string of characters that will unambiguously identify the content within the authority scope (it is a string of characters assigned by the authority itself).

As an example, let's assume that BBC wanted to make a CRID for (all the programs of) the Olympics in China. It may have looked something like this

crid://bbc.co.uk/olympics/2008/

This would be a group CRID, that is, a CRID representing a group of contents. Then, to refer to a specific event – such as the women's shot-put final – they could have used the following inside their metadata.

crid://bbc.co.uk/olympics/2008/final/shotput/women

Currently, four types of CRIDs are playing a major role in some unidirectional television networks: programme CRID, series CRID, group CRID, and recommendation CRID. One of the most important applications of CRIDs is the so-called series link recording function (SL) of modern digital video recorders (DVR, PVR).

In turn, a locator is a string of characters that contains all the necessary information for a receiver to find and acquire a given content, whether it is received through a transport stream, located in local storage, downloaded as a file from an Internet server, or through a streaming service. For example, a DVB locator will include all the necessary parameters to identify a specific content within a transport stream: network, transport stream, service, table and/or event identifiers.

The locators' format, as established in TV-Anytime, is quite generic and simple, and corresponds to:

[transport-mechanism]:[specific-data]

The first part of the locator's format (the transport mechanism) must be a string of characters that is unique for each mechanism (transport stream, local file, HTTP Internet access...). The second part must be unambiguous only within the scope of a given transport mechanism and will be standardized by the organism in charge of the regulation of the mechanism itself. For instance, a DVB locator to identify a content within the transport stream of networks that follow this standard would be:

dvb://112.4a2.5ec;2d22~20121212T220000Z—PT01H30M

which would indicate a content (identified by the string “2d22”) that airs on a channel available on a DVB network identified by the address “112.4a2.5ec” (network “112”, transport stream “4a2” and service “5ec”), on 12 December 2012 at 10 p.m. and with a duration of 90 minutes.

== The location resolution process ==
The location resolution process is the procedure by which, starting from the CRID of a given content, one or several locators of that content are obtained. Resolving a CRID can be a direct process, which leads immediately to one or many locators, or it may also happen that in the first place one or many intermediate CRIDs are returned, which must undergo the same procedure to finally obtain one or several locators.

This procedure involves some information elements, among which we find two structures named resolving authority record (RAR) and ContentReferencingTable, respectively. Consulting them repeatedly will take the receiver from a CRID to one or many locators that will allow it to acquire the content.

The RAR table

The RAR table is one or many data structures that provide the receiver, for each authority that submits CRIDs, information on the corresponding resolution service provider. Among other things, it informs about which mechanism is used to provide information to resolve the CRIDs from each authority. That is, one or many RAR records must exist for each authority that indicate the receiver where it has to go to resolve the CRIDs of that particular authority.

For example, in the record of the figure (expressed by means of a XML structure, according to the XML Schema defined in the TV-Anytime) there is an authority called “tve.es”, whose resolution service provider is the entity “rtve.es”, available on the URL "http://tva.rtve.es/locres/tve", which means there is resolution information in that URL.

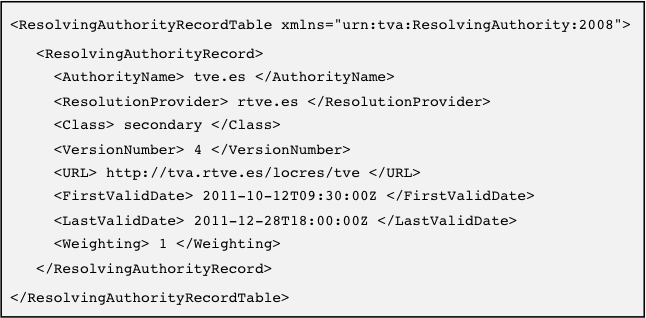
RAR table in XML format

These RAR records will have reached the receiver in an indefinite form, unimportant for the TV-Anytime specification, which will depend on the specific transport mechanism of the network to which the receiver is connected. Each family of standards that regulates distribution networks (DVB, ATSC, ISDB, IPTV...) will have previously defined such procedure, which will be used by devices certified according to those standards.

The ContentReferencingTable table

The second structure involved in the location resolution process is a proper resolution table which, given a content's CRID, returns one or several locators that enable the receiver to access an instance of that content, or one or many CRIDs that allow it to move forward in the resolution process.

The figure shows an example of this second structure, an XML document according to the specifications of the XML Schema defined in TV-Anytime. In it, several sections are included (<Result> elements) that structure the information that describes each resolution case.

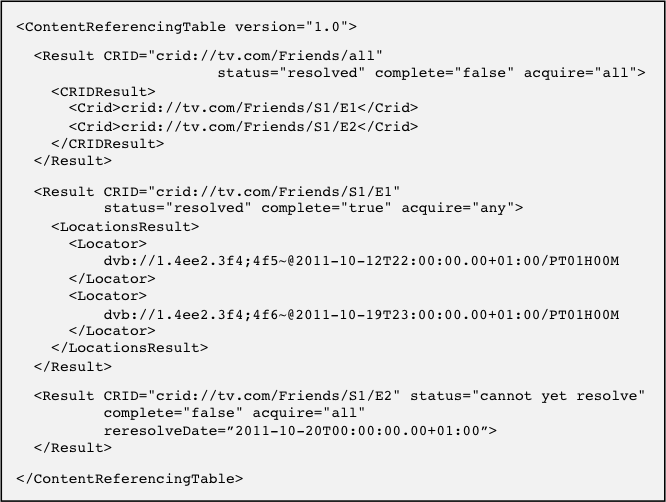
an example of a ContentReferencingTable

The first one declares how a CRID (crid://tv.com/Friends/all), which corresponds to a group content that encompasses several episodes (two) of the “Friends” series is resolved. The result of the resolution process provides two new CRIDs each of them corresponding to one of the two episodes.

The second <Result> element resolves the CRID of the first episode of the first season. The result of the resolution process is two DVB locators. The “acquire” attribute with “any” value indicates that any of them are good (the second one is a repetition broadcast a week later).

The third <Result> element gives information about the second episode. It indicates that it cannot be resolved yet (“status” attribute with the “cannot yet resolve” value), indicating a date on which the request for resolution information must be repeated.

The process

Once the user has selected a given content (identified by the corresponding CRID) to perform some action upon it, the receiver begins the location resolution process that shall lead to specific location information that allows access to a copy of the content.

This procedure depends mainly on the receiver's connectivity. It is possible to make a basic distinction between unidirectional networks, where the receiver can only receive information through the broadcast channel, and bidirectional networks, where there is also a return channel through which the receiver can communicate with the outside (typically an Internet access).

For receivers connected only to a broadcast channel, it is clear that the resolution information must come directly from that channel, or be available somehow in an existing local storage system. After selecting a CRID, the first thing the receiver needs to do is check the information about where to find the resolution table. For this, it must find a RAR record associated with the authority of the selected CRID.

Once a RAR record corresponding to that authority is found, the receiver will know, by referring to the URL field, where to access (or, in this case, where to listen) to obtain the resolution information.

The information that will receive through that access point will consist of a message for each of the consulted CRIDs (for example, a <Result> element in the ContentReferencingTable).

== Web casting ==
To make the CRID even more globally available the IETF will publish a request for comments specifying the use of the CRID over the web. This will allow consumer devices to hook up to content provider servers, much like current browsers look up webservers, requesting content by CRID.

In May 2005, an Informational RFC, No 4078, was published as the start of this work.

The long-term goal is that CRIDs should be available for use by cell phones, PDAs, digital TV receivers and other consumer devices for fetching content, either from a broadcast stream or over IP networks.

== See also ==
- BBC Programme Identifier
