= 2013 St. Louis Rams season =

NFL team season

- Owner: Stan Kroenke
- General manager: Les Snead
- Head coach: Jeff Fisher
- Home stadium: Edward Jones Dome

Results
- Record: 7–9
- Division place: 4th NFC West
- Playoffs: Did not qualify
- Pro Bowlers: DE Robert Quinn; P Johnny Hekker

Uniform
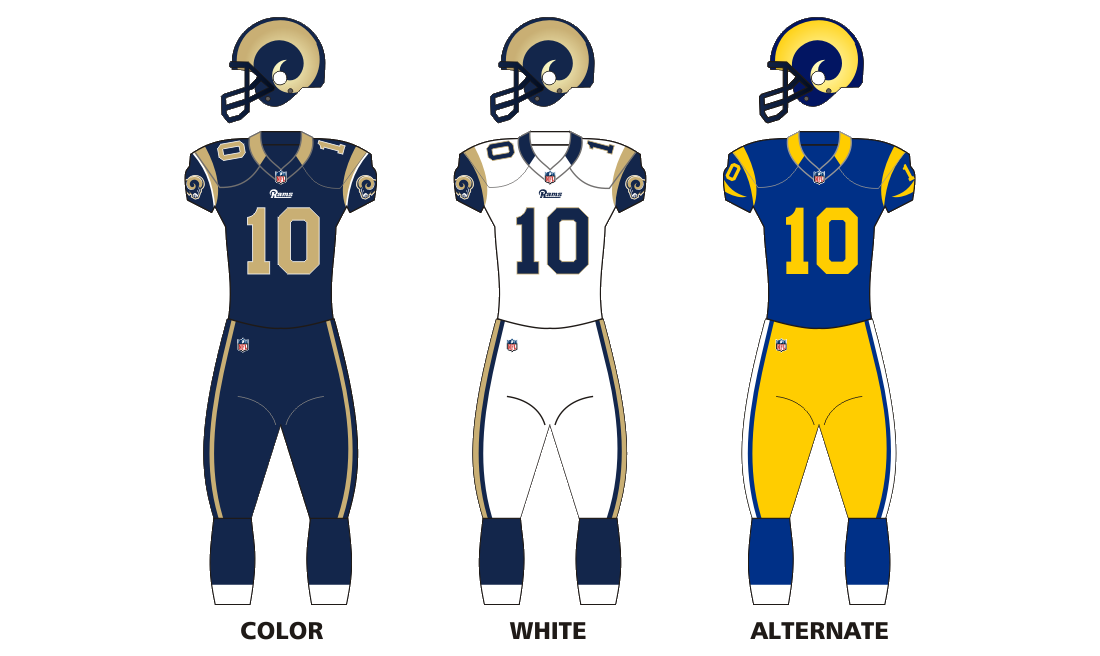

The 2013 season was the St. Louis Rams' 76th in the National Football League (NFL), their 19th in St. Louis and their second under head coach Jeff Fisher. The Rams equaled their win total from 2012, but missed the playoffs for a ninth consecutive season.

Week 7 saw Sam Bradford make his final appearance in a Rams uniform, as he tore his ACL in a game against the Carolina Panthers. That same injury prevented him from playing in the 2014 season, and he did not play another down in a Rams uniform as he was traded to the Philadelphia Eagles following the 2014 season.

== 2013 draft ==
| Round | Selection | Player | Position | College |
|---|---|---|---|---|
| 1 | 8^{[a]} | Tavon Austin | Wide receiver | West Virginia |
| 1 | 30^{[b]} | Alec Ogletree | Linebacker | Georgia |
| 3 | 71^{[a]} | T. J. McDonald | Safety | USC |
| 3 | 92^{[b]} | Stedman Bailey | Wide receiver | West Virginia |
| 4 | 113 | Barrett Jones | Guard | Alabama |
| 5 | 149 | Brandon McGee | Cornerback | Miami (FL) |
| 5 | 160^{[b]} | Zac Stacy | Running back | Vanderbilt |

Notes

^{^[a]} The Rams traded their first- (No. 16 overall), second- (No. 46 overall), original third- (No. 78 overall) and seventh- (No. 222 overall) round selections to the Buffalo Bills in exchange for the Bills' first- (No. 8) and third- (No. 71 overall) round selections.
^{^[b]} The Rams acquired an additional first-round selection – No. 22 overall – as part of a trade that sent their 2012 first-round selection to the Washington Redskins. The Rams later traded the No. 22 selection and a 2015 seventh-round selection (previously acquired in a 2012 trade that sent wide receiver Greg Salas to the New England Patriots) to the Atlanta Falcons in exchange for the Falcons' 2013 first-, third- and sixth- round selections – Nos. 30, 92 and 198 overall, respectively. The No. 198 selection, along with the Rams' original sixth-round selection (No. 184 overall), was traded to the Houston Texans in exchange for the Texans' fifth-round selection (No. 160 overall).

== Staff ==
2013 St. Louis Rams staff
| Front office: Owner/chairman – Stan Kroenke; Owner/vice chairman – Chip Rosenbloom; Executive vice president of football operations/coo – Kevin Demoff; general manager – Les Snead; Director of college scouting – Taylor Morton; Director of pro personnel – Ran Carthon; Head coaches: Executive vice president/head coach – Jeff Fisher; Assistant head coach – Dave McGinnis; Offensive coaches: Offensive coordinator – Brian Schottenheimer; Quarterbacks – Frank Cignetti, Jr.; Running backs – Ben Sirmans; Wide receivers – Ray Sherman; Tight ends – Rob Boras; Offensive line – Paul Boudreau; Assistant offensive line – Andy Dickerson; Offensive quality control – Andy Sugarman | Defensive coaches: Defensive coordinator – Tim Walton; Defensive line – Mike Waufle; Assistant defensive line – Clyde Simmons; Linebackers – Frank Bush; Assistant linebackers – Joe Bowden; Secondary – Chuck Cecil; Assistant secondary – Brandon Fisher; Defensive quality control – Dennard Wilson; Special teams coaches: Special teams coordinator – John Fassel; Assistant special teams coordinator – Paul Boudreau, Jr.; Strength and conditioning: Head strength and conditioning – Rock Gullickson; Assistant strength and conditioning – Adam Bailey |

== Final roster ==
2013 St. Louis Rams roster
| Quarterbacks (QB): 10 Kellen Clemens; 9 Austin Davis; Running backs (RB): 36 Benny Cunningham; 46 Cory Harkey FB; 24 Isaiah Pead; 34 Chase Reynolds; 26 Daryl Richardson; 30 Zac Stacy; Wide receivers (WR): 11 Tavon Austin; 12 Stedman Bailey; 13 Chris Givens; 18 Austin Pettis; 83 Brian Quick; 19 Justin Veltung; Tight ends (TE): 89 Jared Cook; 88 Lance Kendricks; 82 Mike McNeill | Offensive linemen (OL): 72 Joe Barksdale T/G; 61 Tim Barnes C; 62 Harvey Dahl G; 67 Barrett Jones G; 75 Mike Person T; 76 Rodger Saffold T; 66 Shelley Smith G; 70 Brandon Washington G; 65 Chris Williams G; Defensive linemen (DL): 90 Michael Brockers DT; 71 Matthew Conrath DT; 93 Jermelle Cudjo DT; 95 William Hayes DE; 98 Kendall Langford DT; 91 Chris Long DE; 94 Robert Quinn DE; 97 Eugene Sims DE | Linebackers (LB): 50 Ray-Ray Armstrong OLB; 53 Daren Bates MLB; 57 Sammy Brown OLB; 58 Jo-Lonn Dunbar OLB; 55 James Laurinaitis MLB; 52 Alec Ogletree OLB; 51 Will Witherspoon OLB; Defensive backs (DB): 38 Cody Davis FS; 27 Matt Giordano SS; 21 Janoris Jenkins CB; 22 Trumaine Johnson CB; 25 T. J. McDonald SS; 32 Brandon McGee CB; 23 Rodney McLeod FS; 33 Quinton Pointer CB; 20 Darian Stewart SS; Special teams (ST): 6 Johnny Hekker P; 44 Jake McQuaide LS; 4 Greg Zuerlein K | Practice squad: 14 Harry Adams WR; 16 Emory Blake WR; 96 Mason Brodine DE; 41 Marcus Burley CB; 84 Justice Cunningham TE; 64 Sean Hooey T; 56 Caleb McSurdy LB; 35 Darren Woodard CB; Reserve: 8 Sam Bradford QB (IR); 37 Matt Daniels SS (IR); 31 Cortland Finnegan CB (IR); 77 Jake Long T (IR); 73 Graham Pocic T (IR); 3 Brady Quinn QB (IR); 54 Phillip Steward OLB (IR); 63 Scott Wells C (IR); Rookies in italics 53 active, 8 reserve, 8 practice squad |

== Schedule ==
=== Preseason ===
| Week | Date | Opponent | Result | Record | Venue | Recap |
|---|---|---|---|---|---|---|
| 1 | August 8 | at Cleveland Browns | **L** 19–27 | 0–1 | FirstEnergy Stadium | Recap |
| 2 | August 17 | Green Bay Packers | **L** 7–19 | 0–2 | Edward Jones Dome | Recap |
| 3 | August 24 | at Denver Broncos | **L** 26–27 | 0–3 | Sports Authority Field at Mile High | Recap |
| 4 | August 29 | Baltimore Ravens | **W** 24–21 | 1–3 | Edward Jones Dome | Recap |

=== Regular season ===
| Week | Date | Opponent | Result | Record | Venue | Recap |
|---|---|---|---|---|---|---|
| 1 | September 8 | **Arizona Cardinals** | **W** 27–24 | 1–0 | Edward Jones Dome | Recap |
| 2 | September 15 | at Atlanta Falcons | **L** 24–31 | 1–1 | Georgia Dome | Recap |
| 3 | September 22 | at Dallas Cowboys | **L** 7–31 | 1–2 | AT&T Stadium | Recap |
| 4 | September 26 | **San Francisco 49ers** | **L** 11–35 | 1–3 | Edward Jones Dome | Recap |
| 5 | October 6 | Jacksonville Jaguars | **W** 34–20 | 2–3 | Edward Jones Dome | Recap |
| 6 | October 13 | at Houston Texans | **W** 38–13 | 3–3 | Reliant Stadium | Recap |
| 7 | October 20 | at Carolina Panthers | **L** 15–30 | 3–4 | Bank of America Stadium | Recap |
| 8 | October 28 | **Seattle Seahawks** | **L** 9–14 | 3–5 | Edward Jones Dome | Recap |
| 9 | November 3 | Tennessee Titans | **L** 21–28 | 3–6 | Edward Jones Dome | Recap |
| 10 | November 10 | at Indianapolis Colts | **W** 38–8 | 4–6 | Lucas Oil Stadium | Recap |
| 11 | Bye | | | | | |
| 12 | November 24 | Chicago Bears | **W** 42–21 | 5–6 | Edward Jones Dome | Recap |
| 13 | December 1 | at **San Francisco 49ers** | **L** 13–23 | 5–7 | Candlestick Park | Recap |
| 14 | December 8 | at **Arizona Cardinals** | **L** 10–30 | 5–8 | University of Phoenix Stadium | Recap |
| 15 | December 15 | New Orleans Saints | **W** 27–16 | 6–8 | Edward Jones Dome | Recap |
| 16 | December 22 | Tampa Bay Buccaneers | **W** 23–13 | 7–8 | Edward Jones Dome | Recap |
| 17 | December 29 | at **Seattle Seahawks** | **L** 9–27 | 7–9 | CenturyLink Field | Recap |

Note: Intra-division opponents are in bold text.

=== Game summaries ===
==== Week 1: vs. Arizona Cardinals ====
Week One: Arizona Cardinals at St. Louis Rams – Game summary

| Quarter | 1 | 2 | 3 | 4 | Total |
|---|---|---|---|---|---|
| Cardinals | 0 | 10 | 14 | 0 | **24** |
| **Rams** | 0 | 10 | 3 | 14 | **27** |

at Edward Jones Dome, St. Louis, Missouri

- Date: September 8
- Game time: 3:25 p.m. CDT
- Game weather: Played indoors (dome stadium)
- Game attendance: 55,279
- Referee: Clete Blakeman
- TV announcers (Fox): Dick Stockton, Ronde Barber and Kris Budden
- Recap, Game book

Game information

**First quarter**

- No scoring plays.

**Second quarter**

- ARI – Larry Fitzgerald 4-yard pass from Carson Palmer (Jay Feely kick), 14:11. Cardinals 7–0. **Drive: 8 plays, 80 yards, 3:19.**
- STL – Greg Zuerlein 36-yard field goal, 11:20. Cardinals 7–3. **Drive: 7 plays, 61 yards, 2:51.**
- ARI – Jay Feely 30-yard field goal, 5:23. Cardinals 10–3. **Drive: 13 plays, 80 yards, 5:57.**
- STL – Jared Cook 13-yard pass from Sam Bradford (Greg Zuerlein kick), 0:26. Tied 10–10. **Drive: 12 plays, 80 yards, 4:57.**

**Third quarter**

- STL – Greg Zuerlein 25-yard field goal, 13:57. Rams 13–10. **Drive: 4 plays, -3 yards, 0:50.**
- ARI – Dan Williams 2-yard interception return (Jay Feely kick), 10:34. Cardinals 17–13.
- ARI – Larry Fitzgerald 24-yard pass from Carson Palmer (Jay Feely kick), 1:47. Cardinals 24–13. **Drive: 11 plays, 83 yards, 5:16.**

**Fourth quarter**

- STL – Jared Cook 1-yard pass from Sam Bradford (Sam Bradford run), 12:56. Cardinals 24–21. **Drive: 8 plays, 80 yards, 3:51.**
- STL – Greg Zuerlein 38-yard field goal, 9:04. Tied 24–24. **Drive: 4 plays, 2 yards, 1:34.**
- STL – Greg Zuerlein 48-yard field goal, 0:40. Rams 27–24. **Drive: 8 plays, 50 yards, 1:05.**

**Top passers**

- ARI – Carson Palmer – 26/40, 327 yards, 2 TD, INT
- STL – Sam Bradford – 27/38, 299 yards, 2 TD, INT

**Top rushers**

- ARI – Rashard Mendenhall – 16 rushes, 60 yards
- STL – Daryl Richardson – 20 rushes, 63 yards

**Top receivers**

- ARI – Andre Roberts – 8 receptions, 97 yards
- STL – Jared Cook – 7 receptions, 141 yards, 2 TD

==== Week 2: at Atlanta Falcons ====
Week Two: St. Louis Rams at Atlanta Falcons – Game summary

| Quarter | 1 | 2 | 3 | 4 | Total |
|---|---|---|---|---|---|
| Rams | 0 | 3 | 7 | 14 | **24** |
| **Falcons** | 14 | 10 | 0 | 7 | **31** |

at Georgia Dome, Atlanta, Georgia

- Date: September 15
- Game time: 1:00 p.m. EDT/12:00 pm. CDT
- Game weather: Played indoors (dome stadium)
- Game attendance: 70,056
- Referee: Scott Green
- TV announcers (Fox): Kenny Albert, Daryl Johnston and Tony Siragusa
- Recap, Game book

Game information

**First quarter**

- ATL – Steven Jackson 8-yard pass from Matt Ryan (Matt Bryant kick), 8:34. Falcons 7–0. **Drive: 11 plays, 80 yards, 6:26.**
- ATL – Julio Jones 81-yard pass from Matt Ryan (Matt Bryant kick), 1:19. Falcons 14–0. **Drive: 3 plays, 84 yards, 0:39.**

**Second quarter**

- ATL – Osi Umenyiora 68-yard interception return (Matt Bryant kick), 11:25. Falcons 21–0.
- STL – Greg Zuerlein 29-yard field goal, 6:29. Falcons 21–3. **Drive: 10 plays, 69 yards, 4:56.**
- ATL – Matt Bryant 38-yard field goal, 0:09. Falcons 24–3. **Drive: 11 plays, 46 yards, 2:55.**

**Third quarter**

- STL – Tavon Austin 6-yard pass from Sam Bradford (Greg Zuerlein kick), 1:30. Falcons 24–10. **Drive: 6 plays, 74 yards, 1:50.**

**Fourth quarter**

- STL – Austin Pettis 3-yard pass from Sam Bradford (Greg Zuerlein kick), 11:57. Falcons 24–17. **Drive: 8 plays, 75 yards, 3:03.**
- ATL – Jason Snelling 11-yard run (Matt Bryant kick), 6:12. Falcons 31–17. **Drive: 9 plays, 80 yards, 5:45.**
- STL – Tavon Austin 10-yard pass from Sam Bradford (Greg Zuerlein kick), 2:09. Falcons 31–24. **Drive: 16 plays, 80 yards, 4:03.**

**Top passers**

- STL – Sam Bradford – 32/55, 352 yards, 3 TD, INT
- ATL – Matt Ryan – 33/43, 374 yards, 2 TD

**Top rushers**

- STL – Daryl Richardson – 10 rushes, 35 yards
- ATL – Jason Snelling – 2 rushes, 19 yards, TD

**Top receivers**

- STL – Chris Givens – 5 receptions, 105 yards
- ATL – Julio Jones – 11 receptions, 182 yards, TD

==== Week 3: at Dallas Cowboys ====
Week Three: St. Louis Rams at Dallas Cowboys – Game summary

| Quarter | 1 | 2 | 3 | 4 | Total |
|---|---|---|---|---|---|
| Rams | 0 | 0 | 7 | 0 | **7** |
| **Cowboys** | 10 | 7 | 7 | 7 | **31** |

at AT&T Stadium, Arlington, Texas

- Date: September 22
- Game time: 12:00 pm. CDT
- Game weather: Played indoors (retractable roof closed)
- Game attendance: 80,848
- Referee: Carl Cheffers
- TV announcers (Fox): Kenny Albert, Daryl Johnston and Tony Siragusa
- Recap, Game book

Game information

**First quarter**

- DAL – Dez Bryant 2-yard pass from Tony Romo (Dan Bailey kick), 7:06. Cowboys 7–0. **Drive: 8 plays, 61 yards, 4:52.**
- DAL – Dan Bailey 19-yard field goal, 2:06. Cowboys 10–0. **Drive: 8 plays, 58 yards, 3:57.**

**Second quarter**

- DAL – DeMarco Murray 2-yard run (Dan Bailey kick), 9:10. Cowboys 17–0. **Drive: 10 plays, 67 yards, 5:50.**

**Third quarter**

- DAL – Gavin Escobar 24-yard pass from Tony Romo (Dan Bailey kick), 11:39. Cowboys 24–0. **Drive: 6 plays, 80 yards, 3:21.**
- STL – Austin Pettis 4-yard pass from Sam Bradford (Greg Zuerlein kick), 3:20. Cowboys 24–7. **Drive: 13 plays, 75 yards, 6:15.**

**Fourth quarter**

- DAL – Dwayne Harris 24-yard pass from Tony Romo (Dan Bailey kick), 11:55. Cowboys 31–7. **Drive: 3 plays, 45 yards, 1:24.**

**Top passers**

- STL – Sam Bradford – 29/48, 240 yards, TD
- DAL – Tony Romo – 17/24, 210 yards, 3 TD

**Top rushers**

- STL – Isaiah Pead – 6 rushes, 20 yards
- DAL – DeMarco Murray – 26 rushes, 175 yards, TD

**Top receivers**

- STL – Chris Givens – 2 receptions, 54 yards
- DAL – Jason Witten – 5 receptions, 67 yards

==== Week 4: vs. San Francisco 49ers ====
Week Four: San Francisco 49ers at St. Louis Rams – Game summary

| Quarter | 1 | 2 | 3 | 4 | Total |
|---|---|---|---|---|---|
| **49ers** | 0 | 14 | 7 | 14 | **35** |
| Rams | 3 | 0 | 0 | 8 | **11** |

at Edward Jones Dome, St. Louis, Missouri

- Date: September 26
- Game time: 7:25 pm. CDT
- Game weather: Played indoors (dome stadium)
- Game attendance: 56,640
- Referee: Jeff Triplette
- TV announcers (NFLN): Brad Nessler, Mike Mayock and Alex Flanagan
- Recap, Game book

Game information

**First quarter**

- STL – Greg Zuerlein 40-yard field goal, 7:09. Rams 3–0. **Drive: 5 plays, 35 yards, 1:57.**

**Second quarter**

- SF – Anquan Boldin 20-yard pass from Colin Kaepernick (Phil Dawson kick), 6:22. 49ers 7–3. **Drive: 7 plays, 80 yards, 2:55.**
- SF – Frank Gore 34-yard run (Phil Dawson kick), 0:37. 49ers 14–3. **Drive: 8 plays, 80 yards, 3:19.**

**Third quarter**

- SF – Vernon Davis 12-yard pass from Colin Kaepernick (Phil Dawson kick), 8:49. 49ers 21–3. **Drive: 11 plays, 88 yards, 5:03.**

**Fourth quarter**

- SF – Anthony Dixon 1-yard run (Phil Dawson kick), 10:15. 49ers 28–3. **Drive: 2 plays, 3 yards, 0:48.**
- STL – Lance Kendricks 6-yard pass from Sam Bradford (Benny Cunningham run), 5:44. 49ers 28–11. **Drive: 4 plays, 24 yards, 0:57.**
- SF – Kendall Hunter 29-yard run (Phil Dawson kick), 4:25. 49ers 35–11. **Drive: 4 plays, 42 yards, 1:19.**

'Top passers

- SF – Colin Kaepernick – 15/23, 167 yards, 2 TD
- STL – Sam Bradford – 19/41, 202 yards, TD, INT

**Top rushers**

- SF – Frank Gore – 20 rushes, 153 yards, TD
- STL – Daryl Richardson – 12 rushes, 16 yards

**Top receivers**

- SF – Anquan Boldin – 5 receptions, 90 yards, TD
- STL – Austin Pettis – 5 receptions, 59 yards

==== Week 5: vs. Jacksonville Jaguars ====
Week Five: Jacksonville Jaguars at St. Louis Rams – Game summary

| Quarter | 1 | 2 | 3 | 4 | Total |
|---|---|---|---|---|---|
| Jaguars | 10 | 0 | 3 | 7 | **20** |
| **Rams** | 7 | 17 | 0 | 10 | **34** |

at Edward Jones Dome, St. Louis, Missouri

- Date: October 6
- Game time: 12:00 pm. CDT
- Game weather: Played indoors (dome stadium)
- Game attendance: 54,266
- Referee: Tony Corrente
- TV announcers (CBS): Bill Macatee and Steve Tasker
- Recap, Game book

Game information

**First quarter**

- JAX – Justin Blackmon 67-yard pass from Blaine Gabbert (Josh Scobee kick), 10:31. Jaguars 7–0. **Drive: 4 plays, 93 yards, 1:57.**
- STL – Matt Giordano 82-yard interception return (Greg Zuerlein kick), 3:08. Tied 7–7.
- JAX – Josh Scobee 48-yard field goal, 0:13. Jaguars 10–7. **Drive: 7 plays, 50 yards, 2:55.**

**Second quarter**

- STL – Greg Zuerlein 32-yard field goal, 12:03. Tied 10–10. **Drive: 8 plays, 66 yards, 3:10.**
- STL – Lance Kendricks 16-yard pass from Sam Bradford (Greg Zuerlein kick), 11:34. Rams 17–10. **Drive: 1 play, 16 yards, 0:08.**
- STL – Austin Pettis 4-yard pass from Sam Bradford (Greg Zuerlein kick), 0:27. Rams 24–10. **Drive: 12 plays, 90 yards, 5:11.**

**Third quarter**

- JAX – Josh Scobee 34-yard field goal, 3:22. Rams 24–13. **Drive: 7 plays, 53 yards, 1:52.**

**Fourth quarter**

- STL – Greg Zuerlein 37-yard field goal, 14:47. Rams 27–13. **Drive: 10 plays, 65 yards, 3:35.**
- JAX – Cecil Shorts 4-yard pass from Chad Henne (Josh Scobee kick), 10:22. Rams 27–20. **Drive: 12 plays, 80 yards, 4:25.**
- STL – Austin Pettis 31-yard pass from Sam Bradford (Greg Zuerlein kick), 5:45. Rams 34–20. **Drive: 8 plays, 80 yards, 4:37.**

**Top passers**

- JAX – Blaine Gabbert – 9/19, 181 yards, TD, 2 INT
- STL – Sam Bradford – 19/34, 222 yards, 3 TD

**Top rushers**

- JAX – Maurice Jones-Drew – 17 rushes, 70 yards
- STL – Zac Stacy – 14 rushes, 78 yards

**Top receivers**

- JAX – Justin Blackmon – 5 receptions, 136 yards, TD
- STL – Austin Pettis – 4 receptions, 49 yards, 2 TD

==== Week 6: at Houston Texans ====
Week Six: St. Louis Rams at Houston Texans – Game summary

| Quarter | 1 | 2 | 3 | 4 | Total |
|---|---|---|---|---|---|
| **Rams** | 7 | 10 | 21 | 0 | **38** |
| Texans | 0 | 6 | 0 | 7 | **13** |

at Reliant Stadium, Houston, Texas

- Date: October 13
- Game time: 12:00 pm. CDT
- Game weather: Played indoors (retractable roof closed)
- Game attendance: 71,104
- Referee: Bill Leavy
- TV announcers (Fox): Chris Myers, Tim Ryan and Jennifer Hale
- Recap, Game book

Game information

**First quarter**

- STL – Cory Harkey 2-yard pass from Sam Bradford (Greg Zuerlein kick), 5:59. Rams 7–0. **Drive: 6 plays, 65 yards, 2:48.**

**Second quarter**

- STL – Greg Zuerlein 42-yard field goal, 13:22. Rams 10–0. **Drive: 6 plays, 19 yards, 3:22.**
- HOU – Randy Bullock 20-yard field goal, 8:21. Rams 10–3. **Drive: 8 plays, 78 yards, 5:01.**
- STL – Lance Kendricks 2-yard pass from Sam Bradford (Greg Zuerlein kick), 2:43. Rams 17–3. **Drive: 10 plays, 80 yards, 5:38.**
- HOU – Randy Bullock 35-yard field goal, 0:49. Rams 17–6. **Drive: 8 plays, 63 yards, 1:54.**

**Third quarter**

- STL – Brian Quick 4-yard pass from Sam Bradford (Greg Zuerlein kick), 7:42. Rams 24–6. **Drive: 10 plays, 80 yards, 5:20.**
- STL – Daren Bates 11-yard fumble return (Greg Zuerlein kick), 7:36. Rams 31–6.
- STL – Alec Ogletree 98-yard interception return (Greg Zuerlein kick), 0:36. Rams 38–6.

**Fourth quarter**

- HOU – Ben Tate 1-yard run (Randy Bullock kick), 3:15. Rams 38–13. **Drive: 12 plays, 47 yards, 6:06.**

**Top passers**

- STL – Sam Bradford – 12/16, 117 yards, 3 TD
- HOU – Matt Schaub – 15/21, 186 yards

**Top rushers**

- STL – Zac Stacy – 18 rushes, 79 yards
- HOU – Arian Foster – 20 rushes, 141 yards

**Top receivers**

- STL – Jared Cook – 2 receptions, 45 yards
- HOU – Andre Johnson – 7 receptions, 86 yards

==== Week 7: at Carolina Panthers ====
Week Seven: St. Louis Rams at Carolina Panthers – Game summary

| Quarter | 1 | 2 | 3 | 4 | Total |
|---|---|---|---|---|---|
| Rams | 2 | 3 | 7 | 3 | **15** |
| **Panthers** | 7 | 10 | 10 | 3 | **30** |

at Bank of America Stadium, Charlotte, North Carolina

- Date: October 20
- Game time: 1:00 pm. EDT/12:00 pm. CDT
- Game weather: 68 °F (20 °C), sunny
- Game attendance: 72,686
- Referee: Bill Vinovich
- TV announcers (Fox): Dick Stockton, Brian Billick and Laura Okmin
- Recap, Game book

Game information

**First quarter**

- CAR – Captain Munnerlyn 45-yard interception return (Graham Gano kick), 14:39. Panthers 7–0.
- STL – Mike Tolbert tackled in endzone by Eugene Sims for a safety, 5:23. Panthers 7–2.

**Second quarter**

- CAR – Graham Gano 37-yard field goal, 14:12. Panthers 10–2. **Drive: 9 plays, 44 yards, 4:30.**
- STL – Greg Zuerlein 28-yard field goal, 5:25. Panthers 10–5. **Drive: 15 plays, 70 yards, 8:47.**
- CAR – Mike Tolbert 1-yard run (Graham Gano kick), 1:05. Panthers 17–5. **Drive: 8 plays, 80 yards, 4:20.**

**Third quarter**

- CAR – Graham Gano 31-yard field goal, 6:46. Panthers 20–5. **Drive: 13 plays, 61 yards, 8:14.**
- STL – Zac Stacy 4-yard pass from Sam Bradford (Greg Zuerlein kick), 5:22. Panthers 20–12. **Drive: 3 plays, 80 yards, 1:24.**
- CAR – Steve Smith Sr. 19-yard pass from Cam Newton (Graham Gano kick), 0:19. Panthers 27–12. **Drive: 8 plays, 72 yards, 5:02.**

**Fourth quarter**

- CAR – Graham Gano 50-yard field goal, 11:32. Panthers 30–12. **Drive: 5 plays, 20 yards, 2:53.**
- STL – Greg Zuerlein 42-yard field goal, 9:09. Panthers 30–15. **Drive: 9 plays, 56 yards, 2:23.**

**Top passers**

- STL – Sam Bradford – 21/30, 255 yards, TD, INT
- CAR – Cam Newton – 15/17, 204 yards, TD

**Top rushers**

- STL – Zac Stacy – 17 rushes, 53 yards
- CAR – DeAngelo Williams – 15 rushes, 40 yards

**Top receivers**

- STL – Brian Quick – 2 receptions, 97 yards
- CAR – Steve Smith Sr. – 5 receptions, 69 yards, TD

Tempers flared all game long. Not only did the Rams lose the game 15–30, but they lost two starters; defensive end Chris Long was ejected after throwing a punch and quarterback Sam Bradford suffered a season-ending knee injury after running out of bounds. It would also be Sam Bradford's last game in a Rams uniform as he missed all of 2014 with the same injury to the same knee and was traded to the Philadelphia Eagles in 2015.

==== Week 8: vs. Seattle Seahawks ====
Week Eight: Seattle Seahawks at St. Louis Rams – Game summary

| Quarter | 1 | 2 | 3 | 4 | Total |
|---|---|---|---|---|---|
| **Seahawks** | 0 | 7 | 7 | 0 | **14** |
| Rams | 3 | 0 | 3 | 3 | **9** |

at Edward Jones Dome, St. Louis, Missouri

- Date: October 28
- Game time: 7:40 pm. CDT
- Game weather: Played indoors (dome stadium)
- Game attendance: 55,966
- Referee: Gene Steratore
- TV announcers (ESPN): Mike Tirico, Jon Gruden and Lisa Salters
- Recap, Game book

Game information

**First quarter**

- STL – Greg Zuerlein 33-yard field goal, 4:37. Rams 3–0. **Drive: 7 plays, 31 yards, 3:27.**

**Second quarter**

- SEA – Golden Tate 2-yard pass from Russell Wilson (Stephen Hauschka kick), 5:37. Seahawks 7–3. **Drive: 6 plays, 26 yards, 2:41.**

**Third quarter**

- STL – Greg Zuerlein 28-yard field goal, 4:01. Seahawks 7–6. **Drive: 10 plays, 37 yards, 5:51.**
- SEA – Golden Tate 80-yard pass from Russell Wilson (Stephen Hauschka kick), 3:45. Seahawks 14–6. **Drive: 2 plays, 80 yards, 0:16.**

**Fourth quarter**

- STL – Greg Zuerlein 27-yard field goal, 12:51. Seahawks 14–9. **Drive: 11 plays, 69 yards, 5:54.**

**Top passers**

- SEA – Russell Wilson – 10/18, 139 yards, 2 TD
- STL – Kellen Clemens – 15/31, 158 yards, 2 INT

**Top rushers**

- SEA – Marshawn Lynch – 8 rushes, 23 yards
- STL – Zac Stacy – 26 rushes, 134 yards

**Top receivers**

- SEA – Golden Tate – 5 receptions, 93 yards, 2 TD
- STL – Chris Givens – 4 receptions, 59 yards

With Kellen Clemens taking over for the rest of season, the Rams defense played lights out, sacking Russell Wilson seven times and allowing just 135 total yards. However, despite that, the Seahawks would go on to defeat the Rams 14–9.

==== Week 9: vs. Tennessee Titans ====
Week Nine: Tennessee Titans at St. Louis Rams – Game summary

| Quarter | 1 | 2 | 3 | 4 | Total |
|---|---|---|---|---|---|
| **Titans** | 7 | 0 | 7 | 14 | **28** |
| Rams | 0 | 7 | 7 | 7 | **21** |

at Edward Jones Dome, St. Louis, Missouri

- Date: November 3
- Game time: 12:00 pm. CST
- Game weather: Played indoors (dome stadium)
- Game attendance: 54,617
- Referee: Pete Morelli
- TV announcers (CBS): Marv Albert and Rich Gannon
- Recap, Game book

Game information

**First quarter**

- TEN – Shonn Greene 5-yard run (Rob Bironas kick), 11:53. Titans 7–0. **Drive: 7 plays, 68 yards, 3:07.**

**Second quarter**

- STL – Zac Stacy 3-yard run (Greg Zuerlein kick), 9:37. Tied 7–7. **Drive: 12 plays, 80 yards, 8:05.**

**Third quarter**

- STL – Zac Stacy 9-yard run (Greg Zuerlein kick), 9:09. Rams 14–7. **Drive: 10 plays, 80 yards, 5:51.**
- TEN – Chris Johnson 14-yard run (Rob Bironas kick), 4:58. Tied 14–14. **Drive: 8 plays, 70 yards, 4:11.**

**Fourth quarter**

- TEN – Jake Locker 5-yard run (Rob Bironas kick), 9:42. Titans 21–14. **Drive: 10 plays, 71 yards, 5:18.**
- STL – Jared Cook 10-yard pass from Kellen Clemens (Greg Zuerlein kick), 6:15. Tied 21–21. **Drive: 7 plays, 80 yards, 3:27.**
- TEN – Chris Johnson 19-yard run (Rob Bironas kick), 2:54. Titans 28–21. **Drive: 1 play, 19 yards, 0:05.**

**Top passers**

- TEN – Jake Locker – 13/22, 185 yards, 2 INT
- STL – Kellen Clemens – 20/35, 210 yards, TD

**Top rushers**

- TEN – Chris Johnson – 23 rushes, 150 yards, 2 TD
- STL – Zac Stacy – 27 rushes, 127 yards, 2 TD

**Top receivers**

- TEN – Kendall Wright – 3 receptions, 69 yards
- STL – Chris Givens – 4 receptions, 55 yards

==== Week 10: at Indianapolis Colts ====
Week Ten: St. Louis Rams at Indianapolis Colts – Game summary

| Quarter | 1 | 2 | 3 | 4 | Total |
|---|---|---|---|---|---|
| **Rams** | 7 | 21 | 10 | 0 | **38** |
| Colts | 0 | 0 | 8 | 0 | **8** |

at Lucas Oil Stadium, Indianapolis, Indiana

- Date: November 10
- Game time: 1:00 pm. EST/12:00 pm. CST
- Game weather: Played indoors (retractable roof closed)
- Game attendance: 66,004
- Referee: Terry McAulay
- TV announcers (Fox): Chris Myers, Tim Ryan and Jennifer Hale
- Recap, Game book

Game information

**First quarter**

- STL – Chris Long 45-yard fumble return (Greg Zuerlein kick), 12:12. Rams 7–0.

**Second quarter**

- STL – Zac Stacy 1-yard run (Greg Zuerlein kick), 14:30. Rams 14–0. **Drive: 4 plays, 43 yards, 1:29.**
- STL – Tavon Austin 98-yard punt return (Greg Zuerlein kick), 10:28. Rams 21–0.
- STL – Tavon Austin 57-yard pass from Kellen Clemens (Greg Zuerlein kick), 6:58. Rams 28–0. **Drive: 5 plays, 73 yards, 2:03.**

**Third quarter**

- STL – Tavon Austin 81-yard pass from Kellen Clemens (Greg Zuerlein kick), 13:55. Rams 35–0. **Drive: 3 plays, 82 yards, 1:05.**
- STL – Greg Zuerlein 32-yard field goal, 5:15. Rams 38–0. **Drive: 8 plays, 45 yards, 4:46.**
- IND – Donald Brown 13-yard pass from Andrew Luck (Andrew Luck-Coby Fleener pass), 1:35. Rams 38–8. **Drive: 8 plays, 80 yards, 3:40.**

**Fourth quarter**

- No scoring plays.

**Top passers**

- STL – Kellen Clemens – 9/16, 247 yards, 2 TD
- IND – Andrew Luck – 29/47, 353 yards, TD, 3 INT

**Top rushers**

- STL – Benny Cunningham – 7 rushes, 72 yards
- IND – Andrew Luck – 4 rushes, 17 yards

**Top receivers**

- STL – Tavon Austin – 2 receptions, 138 yards, 2 TD
- IND – T.Y. Hilton – 7 receptions, 130 yards

The Rams harassed Andrew Luck and the Colts all game long, stunning Indy with a 38–8 blowout. The game's highlights included Chris Long returning a fumble for a 45 yards to give the Rams the game's first points. Tavon Austin broke the hearts of Colts' fans with three touchdowns, one returned for 98 yards and two receptions.

==== Week 12: vs. Chicago Bears ====
Week Twelve: Chicago Bears at St. Louis Rams – Game summary

| Quarter | 1 | 2 | 3 | 4 | Total |
|---|---|---|---|---|---|
| Bears | 7 | 7 | 0 | 7 | **21** |
| **Rams** | 21 | 3 | 3 | 15 | **42** |

at Edward Jones Dome, St. Louis, Missouri

- Date: November 24
- Game time: 12:00 pm. CST
- Game weather: Played indoors (dome stadium)
- Game attendance: 66,024
- Referee: Jerome Boger
- TV announcers (Fox): Kenny Albert, Daryl Johnston and Tony Siragusa
- Recap, Game book

Game information

**First quarter**

- STL – Tavon Austin 65-yard run (Greg Zuerlein kick), 13:30. Rams 7–0. **Drive: 3 plays, 81 yards, 1:30.**
- STL – Zac Stacy 1-yard run (Greg Zuerlein kick), 12:36. Rams 14–0. **Drive: 3 plays, 7 yards, 0:43.**
- CHI – Martellus Bennett 7-yard pass from Josh McCown (Robbie Gould kick), 6:14. Rams 14–7. **Drive: 11 plays, 80 yards, 6:22.**
- STL – Jared Cook 6-yard pass from Kellen Clemens (Greg Zuerlein kick), 1:27. Rams 21–7. **Drive: 9 plays, 80 yards, 4:47.**

**Second quarter**

- CHI – Brandon Marshall 3-yard pass from Josh McCown (Robbie Gould kick), 5:19. Rams 21–14. **Drive: 12 plays, 68 yards, 5:58.**
- STL – Greg Zuerlein 29-yard field goal, 1:11. Rams 24–14. **Drive: 10 plays, 69 yards, 4:08.**

**Third quarter**

- STL – Greg Zuerlein 40-yard field goal, 3:59. Rams 27–14. **Drive: 11 plays, 73 yards, 4:17.**

**Fourth quarter**

- CHI – Michael Bush 1-yard run (Robbie Gould kick), 7:15. Rams 27–21. **Drive: 12 plays, 72 yards, 7:24.**
- STL – Benny Cunningham 9-yard run (Kellen Clemens-Isaiah Pead pass), 3:05. Rams 35–21. **Drive: 7 plays, 80 yards, 4:10.**
- STL – Robert Quinn 31-yard fumble return (Greg Zuerlein kick), 2:05. Rams 42–21.

**Top passers**

- CHI – Josh McCown – 36/47, 352 yards, 2 TD, INT
- STL – Kellen Clemens – 10/22, 167 yards, TD

**Top rushers**

- CHI – Matt Forte – 16 rushes, 77 yards
- STL – Benny Cunningham – 13 rushes, 109 yards, TD

**Top receivers**

- CHI – Brandon Marshall – 10 receptions, 117 yards, TD
- STL – Jared Cook – 4 receptions, 80 yards, TD

==== Week 13: at San Francisco 49ers ====
Week Thirteen: St. Louis Rams at San Francisco 49ers – Game summary

| Quarter | 1 | 2 | 3 | 4 | Total |
|---|---|---|---|---|---|
| Rams | 0 | 3 | 3 | 7 | **13** |
| **49ers** | 3 | 10 | 3 | 7 | **23** |

at Candlestick Park, San Francisco, California

- Date: December 1
- Game time: 3:05 pm. CST/1:05 p.m. PST
- Game weather: 59 °F (15 °C), sunny
- Game attendance: 69,732
- Referee: Bill Vinovich
- TV announcers (Fox): Kevin Burkhardt, John Lynch and Molly McGrath
- Recap, Game book

Game information

**First quarter**

- SF – Phil Dawson 32-yard field goal, 7:36. 49ers 3–0. **Drive: 12 plays, 53 yards, 5:15.**

**Second quarter**

- SF – Phil Dawson 43-yard field goal, 14:16. 49ers 6–0. **Drive: 10 plays, 47 yards, 6:33.**
- SF – Frank Gore 3-yard run (Phil Dawson kick), 6:15. 49ers 13–0. **Drive: 12 plays, 72 yards, 6:00.**
- STL – Greg Zuerlein 43-yard field goal, 0:54. 49ers 13–3. **Drive: 13 plays, 44 yards, 5:21.**

**Third quarter**

- STL – Greg Zuerlein 34-yard field goal, 8:56. 49ers 13–6. **Drive: 8 plays, 33 yards, 4:35.**
- SF – Phil Dawson 24-yard field goal, 3:25. 49ers 16–6. **Drive: 10 plays, 72 yards, 5:31.**

**Fourth quarter**

- SF – Vernon Davis 17-yard pass from Colin Kaepernick (Phil Dawson kick), 14:31. 49ers 23–6. **Drive: 1 play, 17 yards, 0:10.**
- STL – Brian Quick 3-yard pass from Kellen Clemens (Greg Zuerlein kick), 0:18. 49ers 23–13. **Drive: 10 plays, 92 yards, 2:04.**

**Top passers**

- STL – Kellen Clemens – 19/37, 218 yards, TD, INT
- SF – Colin Kaepernick – 19/28, 275 yards, TD

**Top rushers**

- STL – Zac Stacy – 19 rushes, 72 yards
- SF – Frank Gore – 15 rushes, 42 yards, TD

**Top receivers**

- STL – Jared Cook – 3 receptions, 49 yards
- SF – Anquan Boldin – 9 receptions, 98 yards

==== Week 14: at Arizona Cardinals ====
Week Fourteen: St. Louis Rams at Arizona Cardinals – Game summary

| Quarter | 1 | 2 | 3 | 4 | Total |
|---|---|---|---|---|---|
| Rams | 3 | 0 | 0 | 7 | **10** |
| **Cardinals** | 7 | 7 | 9 | 7 | **30** |

at University of Phoenix Stadium, Glendale, Arizona

- Date: December 8
- Game time: 3:25 pm. CST/2:25 p.m. MST
- Game weather: Played indoors (retractable roof closed)
- Game attendance: 60,643
- Referee: Walt Coleman
- TV announcers (Fox): Dick Stockton, Ronde Barber and Kris Budden
- Recap, Game book

Game information

**First quarter**

- ARI – Rashard Mendenhall 3-yard run (Jay Feely kick), 10:32. Cardinals 7–0. **Drive: 8 plays, 80 yards, 4:28.**
- STL – Greg Zuerlein 44-yard field goal, 6:12. Cardinals 7–3. **Drive: 8 plays, 49 yards, 4:20.**

**Second quarter**

- ARI – Larry Fitzgerald 7-yard pass from Carson Palmer (Jay Feely kick), 0:50. Cardinals 14–3. **Drive: 10 plays, 80 yards, 3:41.**

**Third quarter**

- ARI – Karlos Dansby 23-yard interception return (Jay Feely kick), 14:42. Cardinals 21–3.
- ARI – Kellen Clemens sacked in the end zone by John Abraham for a safety, 9:10. Cardinals 23–3.

**Fourth quarter**

- STL – Zac Stacy 1-yard run (Greg Zuerlein kick), 14:57. Cardinals 23–10. **Drive: 3 plays, 60 yards, 1:09.**
- ARI – Andre Ellington 6-yard run (Jay Feely kick), 1:55. Cardinals 30–10. **Drive: 6 plays, 27 yards, 2:25.**

**Top passers**

- STL – Kellen Clemens – 16/27, 181 yards, 2 INT
- ARI – Carson Palmer – 27/32, 269 yards, TD

**Top rushers**

- STL – Tavon Austin – 1 rush, 56 yards
- ARI – Andre Ellington – 11 rushes, 46 yards, TD

**Top receivers**

- STL – Jared Cook – 3 receptions, 49 yards
- ARI – Larry Fitzgerald – 12 receptions, 96 yards, TD

With the loss, the Rams clinched their 10th consecutive non-winning season, and were officially eliminated from playoff contention.

==== Week 15: vs. New Orleans Saints ====
Week Fifteen: New Orleans Saints at St. Louis Rams – Game summary

| Quarter | 1 | 2 | 3 | 4 | Total |
|---|---|---|---|---|---|
| Saints | 0 | 3 | 0 | 13 | **16** |
| **Rams** | 14 | 10 | 3 | 0 | **27** |

at Edward Jones Dome, St. Louis, Missouri

- Date: December 15
- Game time: 3:25 pm. CST
- Game weather: Played indoors (dome stadium)
- Game attendance: 58,442
- Referee: Mike Carey
- TV announcers (Fox): Chris Myers, Tim Ryan and Jennifer Hale
- Recap, Game book

Game information

**First quarter**

- STL – Cory Harkey 31-yard pass from Kellen Clemens (Greg Zuerlein kick), 11:20. Rams 7–0. **Drive: 1 play, 31 yards, 0:07.**
- STL – Lance Kendricks 4-yard pass from Kellen Clemens (Greg Zuerlein kick), 2:45. Rams 14–0. **Drive: 9 plays, 93 yards, 4:49.**

**Second quarter**

- STL – Greg Zuerlein 31-yard field goal, 14:57. Rams 17–0. **Drive: 6 plays, 34 yards, 2:48.**
- NO – Garrett Hartley 45-yard field goal, 10:17. Rams 17–3. **Drive: 8 plays, 53 yards, 4:40.**
- STL – Zac Stacy 40-yard run (Greg Zuerlein kick), 4:10. Rams 24–3. **Drive: 5 plays, 82 yards, 2:13.**

**Third quarter**

- STL – Greg Zuerlein 35-yard field goal, 2:42. Rams 27–3. **Drive: 10 plays, 39 yards, 5:30.**

**Fourth quarter**

- NO – Drew Brees 1-yard run (run failed), 11:25. Rams 27–9. **Drive: 14 plays, 80 yards, 6:17.**
- NO – Marques Colston 5-yard pass from Drew Brees (Garrett Hartley kick), 3:07. Rams 27–16. **Drive: 18 plays, 80 yards, 5:07.**

**Top passers**

- NO – Drew Brees – 39/56, 393 yards, TD, 2 INT
- STL – Kellen Clemens – 14/20, 158 yards, 2 TD

**Top rushers**

- NO – Darren Sproles – 7 rushes, 24 yards
- STL – Zac Stacy – 28 rushes, 133 yards, TD

**Top receivers**

- NO – Marques Colston – 8 receptions, 92 yards, TD
- STL – Austin Pettis – 4 receptions, 41 yards

==== Week 16: vs. Tampa Bay Buccaneers ====
Week Sixteen: Tampa Bay Buccaneers at St. Louis Rams – Game summary

| Quarter | 1 | 2 | 3 | 4 | Total |
|---|---|---|---|---|---|
| Buccaneers | 7 | 3 | 3 | 0 | **13** |
| **Rams** | 0 | 14 | 3 | 6 | **23** |

at Edward Jones Dome, St. Louis, Missouri

- Date: December 22
- Game time: 12:00 pm. CST
- Game weather: Played indoors (dome stadium)
- Game attendance: 54,423
- Referee: John Parry
- TV announcers (Fox): Thom Brennaman, Brian Billick and Laura Okmin
- Recap, Game book

Game information

**First quarter**

- TB – Bobby Rainey 1-yard run (Rian Lindell kick), 6:31. Buccaneers 7–0. **Drive: 11 plays, 85 yards, 4:37.**

**Second quarter**

- STL – Zac Stacy 1-yard run (Greg Zuerlein kick), 13:48. Tied 7–7. **Drive: 13 plays, 80 yards, 7:43.**
- STL – Stedman Bailey 27-yard run (Greg Zuerlein kick), 12:04. Rams 14–7. **Drive: 1 play, 27 yards, 0:09.**
- TB – Rian Lindell 35-yard field goal, 0:00. Rams 14–10. **Drive: 9 plays, 36 yards, 4:27.**

**Third quarter**

- TB – Rian Lindell 32-yard field goal, 9:23. Rams 14–13. **Drive: 9 plays, 51 yards, 3:55.**
- STL – Greg Zuerlein 54-yard field goal, 5:08. Rams 17–13. **Drive: 7 plays, 29 yards, 4:15.**

**Fourth quarter**

- STL – Greg Zuerlein 25-yard field goal, 11:15. Rams 20–13. **Drive: 12 plays, 49 yards, 6:33.**
- STL – Greg Zuerlein 48-yard field goal, 3:15. Rams 23–13. **Drive: 9 plays, 29 yards, 5:52.**

**Top passers**

- TB – Mike Glennon – 16/26, 158 yards
- STL – Kellen Clemens – 16/20, 158 yards

**Top rushers**

- TB – Bobby Rainey – 20 rushes, 37 yards, TD
- STL – Zac Stacy – 33 rushes, 104 yards, TD

**Top receivers**

- TB – Vincent Jackson – 5 receptions, 98 yards
- STL – Stedman Bailey – 3 receptions, 44 yards

The Rams defense shut down the Buccaneers' offense throughout the game, but Jake Long tore his ACL, ending his season. Nevertheless, the Rams would win 23–13.

==== Week 17: at Seattle Seahawks ====
Week Seventeen: St. Louis Rams at Seattle Seahawks – Game summary

| Quarter | 1 | 2 | 3 | 4 | Total |
|---|---|---|---|---|---|
| Rams | 0 | 0 | 3 | 6 | **9** |
| **Seahawks** | 7 | 6 | 7 | 7 | **27** |

at CenturyLink Field, Seattle, Washington

- Date: December 29
- Game time: 3:25 pm. CST/1:25 pm. PST
- Game weather: 40 °F (4 °C), cloudy
- Game attendance: 68,264
- Referee: Jeff Triplette
- TV announcers (Fox): Chris Myers, Tim Ryan and Jennifer Hale
- Recap, Game book

Game information

**First quarter**

- SEA – Malcolm Smith 37-yard interception return (Stephen Hauschka kick), 9:50. Seahawks 7–0.

**Second quarter**

- SEA – Stephen Hauschka 28-yard field goal, 6:14. Seahawks 10–0. **Drive: 11 plays, 65 yards, 6:32.**
- SEA – Stephen Hauschka 35-yard field goal, 0:03. Seahawks 13–0. **Drive: 10 plays, 44 yards, 2:40.**

**Third quarter**

- STL – Greg Zuerlein 36-yard field goal, 10:49. Seahawks 13–3. **Drive: 5 plays, 13 yards, 1:28.**
- SEA – Marshawn Lynch 2-yard run (Stephen Hauschka kick), 2:21. Seahawks 20–3. **Drive: 14 plays, 80 yards, 8:28.**

**Fourth quarter**

- SEA – Golden Tate 47-yard pass from Russell Wilson (Stephen Hauschka kick), 9:14. Seahawks 27–3. **Drive: 4 plays, 61 yards, 2:10.**
- STL – Jared Cook 2-yard pass from Kellen Clemens (pass failed), 4:13. Seahawks 27–9. **Drive: 13 plays, 71 yards, 5:01.**

**Top passers**

- STL – Kellen Clemens – 21/30, 157 yards, TD, 2 INT
- SEA – Russell Wilson – 15/23, 172 yards, TD

**Top rushers**

- STL – Zac Stacy – 15 rushes, 15 yards
- SEA – Marshawn Lynch – 23 rushes, 97 yards, TD

**Top receivers**

- STL – Lance Kendricks – 5 receptions, 54 yards
- SEA – Golden Tate – 8 receptions, 129 yards, TD

Traveling to Seattle for the second year in a row to end the regular season, the Rams once again could not respond as they would go on to lose their season finale, 27–9.

== Standings ==
=== Division ===
NFC West
| | W | L | T | PCT | DIV | CONF | PF | PA | STK |
|---|---|---|---|---|---|---|---|---|---|
| ^{(1)} Seattle Seahawks | 13 | 3 | 0 | .813 | 4–2 | 10–2 | 417 | 231 | W1 |
| ^{(5)} San Francisco 49ers | 12 | 4 | 0 | .750 | 5–1 | 9–3 | 406 | 272 | W6 |
| Arizona Cardinals | 10 | 6 | 0 | .625 | 2–4 | 6–6 | 379 | 324 | L1 |
| St. Louis Rams | 7 | 9 | 0 | .438 | 1–5 | 4–8 | 348 | 364 | L1 |

=== Conference ===
NFC
| # | Team | Division | W | L | T | PCT | DIV | CONF | SOS | SOV | STK |
|---|---|---|---|---|---|---|---|---|---|---|---|
Division winners
| 1 | Seattle Seahawks | West | 13 | 3 | 0 | .813 | 4–2 | 10–2 | .490 | .445 | W1 |
| 2 | Carolina Panthers | South | 12 | 4 | 0 | .750 | 5–1 | 9–3 | .494 | .451 | W3 |
| 3 | Philadelphia Eagles | East | 10 | 6 | 0 | .625 | 4–2 | 9–3 | .453 | .391 | W2 |
| 4 | Green Bay Packers | North | 8 | 7 | 1 | .531 | 3–2–1 | 6–5–1 | .453 | .371 | W1 |
Wild cards
| 5 | San Francisco 49ers | West | 12 | 4 | 0 | .750 | 5–1 | 9–3 | .494 | .414 | W6 |
| 6 | New Orleans Saints | South | 11 | 5 | 0 | .688 | 5–1 | 9–3 | .516 | .455 | W1 |
Did not qualify for the postseason
| 7 | Arizona Cardinals | West | 10 | 6 | 0 | .625 | 2–4 | 6–6 | .531 | .444 | L1 |
| 8 (Note: Chicago defeated Dallas head-to-head (Week 14, 45–28).) | Chicago Bears | North | 8 | 8 | 0 | .500 | 2–4 | 4–8 | .465 | .469 | L2 |
| 9 | Dallas Cowboys | East | 8 | 8 | 0 | .500 | 5–1 | 7–5 | .484 | .363 | L1 |
| 10 (Note: The NY Giants and Detroit finished with a better conference record than St. Louis.) (Note: The NY Giants defeated Detroit head-to-head (Week 16, 23–20 (OT)).) | New York Giants | East | 7 | 9 | 0 | .438 | 3–3 | 6–6 | .520 | .366 | W2 |
| 11 (Note: Detroit finished with a better conference record than St. Louis.) | Detroit Lions | North | 7 | 9 | 0 | .438 | 4–2 | 6–6 | .457 | .402 | L4 |
| 12 | St. Louis Rams | West | 7 | 9 | 0 | .438 | 1–5 | 4–8 | .551 | .446 | L1 |
| 13 | Minnesota Vikings | North | 5 | 10 | 1 | .344 | 2–3–1 | 4–7–1 | .512 | .450 | W1 |
| 14 (Note: Atlanta finished with a better conference record than Tampa Bay.) | Atlanta Falcons | South | 4 | 12 | 0 | .250 | 1–5 | 3–9 | .553 | .313 | L2 |
| 15 | Tampa Bay Buccaneers | South | 4 | 12 | 0 | .250 | 1–5 | 2–10 | .574 | .391 | L3 |
| 16 | Washington Redskins | East | 3 | 13 | 0 | .188 | 0–6 | 1–11 | .516 | .438 | L8 |
Tiebreakers (Note: When breaking ties for three or more teams under the NFL's rules, they are first broken within divisions, then comparing only the highest-ranked remaining team from each division.)
