= Isaiah Pead =

American football player (born 1989)

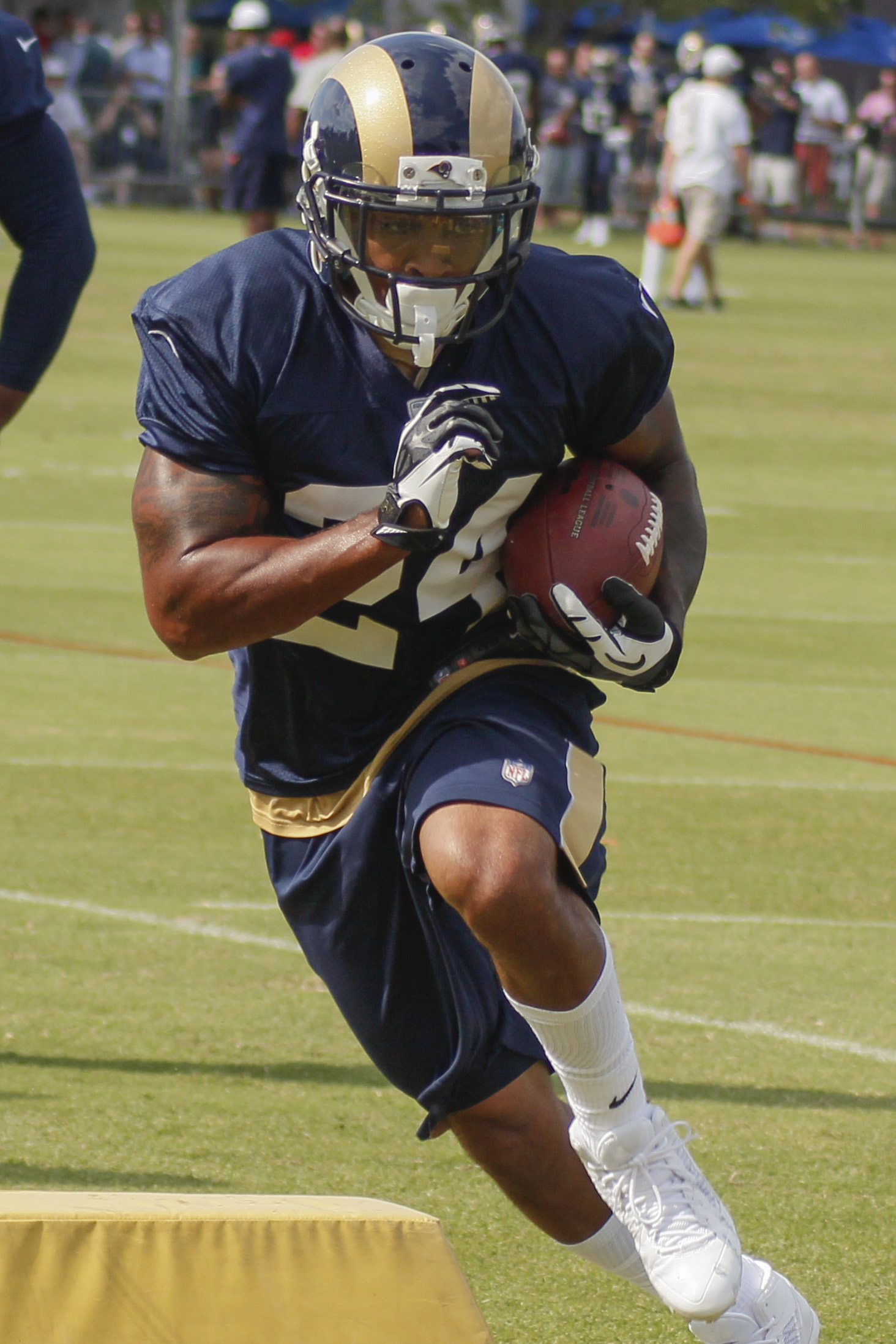
- Pead with the St. Louis Rams in 2013

No. 22, 24
- Position: Running back

Personal information
- Born: December 14, 1989 (age 36); Columbus, Ohio, U.S.
- Listed height: 5 ft 10 in (1.78 m)
- Listed weight: 206 lb (93 kg)

Career information
- High school: Eastmoor (Columbus)
- College: Cincinnati (2008–2011)
- NFL draft: 2012: 2nd round, 50th overall pick

Career history
- St. Louis Rams (2012–2015); Pittsburgh Steelers (2015); Miami Dolphins (2016)

Awards and highlights
- Big East Offensive Player of The Year (2011); First-team All-Big East (2011); Second-team All-Big East (2010)

Career NFL statistics
- Rushing yards: 100
- Rushing average: 3.7
- Receptions: 15
- Receiving yards: 100
- Stats at Pro Football Reference

Isaiah D'Vaughn Pead (born December 14, 1989) is an American former professional football player who was a running back in the National Football League (NFL). He played college football for the Cincinnati Bearcats. Pead was selected by the St. Louis Rams in the second round of the 2012 NFL draft. He was also a member of the Pittsburgh Steelers and Miami Dolphins.

== Early life ==
Pead attended Eastmoor Academy in Columbus, Ohio, where he was a letterman in football and track. In football, he was a four-year letterwinner at running back and defensive back. He rushed for 1,696 yards (10.7 yards per carry) and 24 touchdowns, and also caught 10 passes for 250 yards, including two scores on his way to being named Ohio's Division IV Player of the Year in 2006. He earned the Ohio Division III Player of the Year award after rushing for 2,204 yards (11.5 yards per carry) and scored 39 touchdowns as a senior. He concluded his prep career with 4,443 rushing yards and 63 touchdowns. He is Eastmoor Academy's all-time rushing leader, surpassing two-time Heisman Trophy Winner Archie Griffin.

In track and field, Pead was one of the state's top performers in the sprinting events. He was the 2007 Ohio Division II State 400-meter dash champion, with a PR of 48.16 seconds. He took gold in the 100 meters at the 2008 Eastmoor Academy Invitational, recording a personal-best time of 10.89 seconds. He also ran the 200 meters in 22.05 seconds.

== College career ==
Pead attended the University of Cincinnati from 2008 to 2011. He finished his career with 3,288 rushing yards on 545 carries with 27 touchdowns.

As a senior in 2011, Pead was the MVP of the 2012 Senior Bowl.

== Professional career ==
=== Pre-draft ===
Pre-draft measurables
Height	Weight	Arm length	Hand span	Wingspan	40-yard dash	10-yard split	20-yard split	20-yard shuttle	Three-cone drill	Vertical jump	Broad jump
5 ft 10 1/8 in (1.78 m)	197 lb (89 kg)	31 in (0.79 m)	8 5/8 in (0.22 m)	6 ft 2 3/8 in (1.89 m)	4.47 s	1.55 s	2.63 s	4.32 s	6.81 s	33.0 in (0.84 m)	9 ft 8 in (2.95 m)
All values from NFL Combine/Pro Day

Pead was considered one of the top running back prospects for the 2012 NFL draft.

=== St. Louis Rams ===
Pead was drafted in the second round, 50th overall by the St. Louis Rams.

On May 31, 2013, the NFL announced that Pead would be suspended for the 2013 season opener for violating the substance abuse policy.

During the Rams' second preseason game against the Green Bay Packers in 2014, Pead tore his ACL on a kickoff return. He was placed on IR a few days later.

=== Pittsburgh Steelers ===
Pead was signed by the Pittsburgh Steelers on November 2, 2015, after Le'Veon Bell was placed on season-ending injured reserve with an MCL tear. On November 27, 2015, Pead was released by the Steelers.

=== Miami Dolphins ===
On March 31, 2016, Pead signed with the Miami Dolphins. On October 11, 2016, he was released by the Dolphins.

=== Statistics ===
Source: NFL.com

Year	Team	G	GS	Rushing					Receiving					Fumbles	
Year	Team	G	GS	Att	Yds	Avg	Lng	TD	Rec	Yds	Avg	Lng	TD	FUM	Lost
2012	STL	15	1	10	54	5.4	19	0	3	16	5.3	9	0	2	1
2013	STL	10	0	7	21	3.0	11	0	11	78	7.1	14	0	0	0
2015	STL	2	0	2	3	1.5	4	0	0	0	0.0	0	0	1	1
2016	MIA	3	0	8	22	2.8	4	0	1	6	6.0	6	0	0	0
Total		30	1	27	100	3.7	19	0	15	100	6.7	14	0	3	2

== Car crash and personal life ==
On November 12, 2016, at approximately 2:30 AM, Pead was involved in a serious car crash, in which he was not wearing a seatbelt.

According to the Columbus Division of Police, at about 2:32am, Saturday, Pead was driving his 2011 Cadillac CTS eastbound on I-670 near E. 5th Avenue, when he lost control of the vehicle, and drove off the right side of the roadway. The Cadillac struck the metal guardrail and continued through it. After going through the guardrail the Cadillac became airborne and struck several trees on the way down the embankment. It came to rest about 95 feet from the roadway.

Police said two witnesses stopped and called 911 and provided assistance to Pead and a passenger in the Cadillac, Wesley Richardson, 27, until police arrived at the crash scene.

Pead was taken to Grant Medical Center and had emergency surgery. Pead's injuries were career-ending. Cincinnati football coach, Tommy Tuberville, said Pead lost his left leg in the accident.

Pead reportedly started a trucking company and has one son.
