= Political Intelligence Department =

Political Intelligence Department may refer to:

- Political Intelligence Department (1918–1920), a department of the British Foreign Office
- Political Intelligence Department (1939–1943), a department of the British Foreign Office
