= Internet Matters =

British Internet safety organization

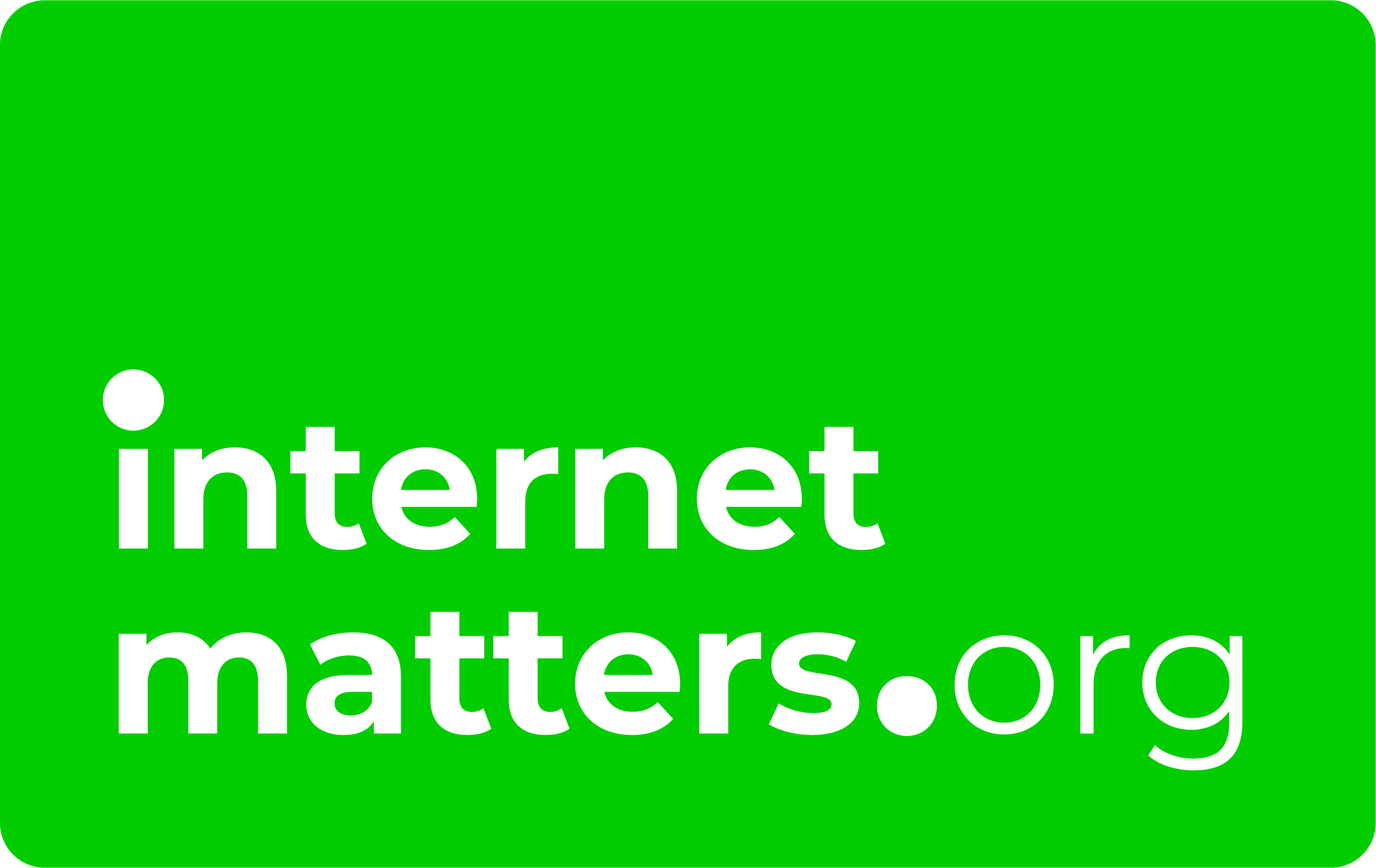
- Logo used from 2022
- Type: Not-for-profit organisation
- Industry: Internet safety
- Founded: May 13, 2014 in London, United Kingdom
- Headquarters: London
- Website: www.internetmatters.org

Internet Matters is a not-for-profit organisation based in London, England. Launched in May 2014 by the United Kingdom's largest internet service providers BT, Sky, TalkTalk and Virgin Media, the organisation offers child internet safety advice to parents, careers and professionals.

== History ==
Internet Matters was launched on 13 May 2014 with a launch event at the Museum of Childhood, Bethnal Green, London attended by guests including Sophie Ellis-Bextor and Janet Ellis and industry experts including Sonia Livingstone. At the time, David Cameron described the launch as 'a significant step forward in our mission to protect our children online'.

Internet Matters is supported by the largest internet service providers in the UK. Between them they have direct relationships with 90% of internet households in the UK. The organisation also works closely with other child e-safety charities and industry bodies including the NSPCC, Childnet, FOSI, the CEOP, search engine Google and TikTok.

=== Partners ===
Partner	Partner Projects
BT, EE and PlusNet	Safer Internet Day: With support from Internet Matters, EE trained thousands of frontline staff at over 600 retail outlets to offer safety support on devices.; Parental controls: Internet Matters hosts parental control guides for BT broadband as well as the EE mobile network and PlusNet's SafeGuard.; PhoneSmart Licence: EE worked with Internet Matters to create the PhoneSmart Licence designed for children about to get their first smartphone. It helps children learn key safety skills before they start using their device.
Sky and NowTV	Hosting resources: Sky hosted Internet Matters' resources at a 3-day onsite Code Camp for those working at Sky and NowTV.
TalkTalk	Sharing resources: TalkTalk included online safety advice in welcome booklets for new customers, which outlines features such as parental controls.; Digital Heroes: Internet Matters helped create an award for projects that focused on empowering and safeguarding young people online.
Virgin Media	Social promotion: Throughout the year, Virgin Media regularly promotes Internet Matters campaigns and controls on social media.
BBC	BBC Own It: Launched in 2018, BBC Own It provided advice to children aged 8–12. As of 2022, it has switched focus to providing advice for parents of these children.; It launched the BBC Own It app to help children make good choices. This has been discontinued.; Internet Matters have provided written content to provide parents on the Own It website.
Google	Google Family Link: Internet Matters helped Google develop step-by-step guides for parents.; Digital Garage: Internet Matters supported Google's creation of their Digital Garage, which provided courses to parents to help them learn the tools to keep children safe online.
Huawei	Research: Huawei sponsored Internet Matters' Living for the Future research about technology and the family home. It looked at challenges and opportunities presented by new technologies and how that intensified during the COVID-19 lockdowns.
Meta	Connecting Safely Online: In 2020, alongside Youthworks and with help from Meta (then Facebook), Internet Matters launched Connecting Safely Online. This hub was designed to support young people with SEND and their parents to help keep them from 'falling through the net' on social media.
Samsung	Staff training: Samsung joined other partners for Safer Internet Day in 2019 to provide training and information to its in-store staff to share online safety information with consumers.; Online safety workshops: Internet Matters worked with Samsung to help them deliver free online safety workshops for parents and carers to keep children safe online across Samsung devices.; The Online Together Project: With Samsung, Internet Matters launched The Online Together Project in 2021, a series of quizzes designed to challenge stereotypes and prejudice online. It launched with a gender stereotypes quiz with more quizzes slated to be added in the long-term.
ESET	Digital Matters: ESET funded the creation of online safety learning platform, Digital Matters in 2022. The platform is designed for teachers to use in the classroom, specifically in PSHE lessons around online safety. It is currently for students in Key Stage 2.
TikTok	Research: In 2022, TikTok supported Intentional Use: How agency supports young people's wellbeing in a digital world completed by Internet Matters. The research explored the role of agency in young people's wellbeing.; TikTok Playbook: In October 2022, Internet Matters launched the TikTok Playbook. They worked with TikTok to create a comprehensive guide to TikTok for teachers.
Supercell	Online gaming advice hub: Along with other online safety hubs, Internet Matters created their online gaming hub to offer advice to parents on video games.
Electronic Arts	Play Together/Play Smart: Internet Matters and EA worked together to campaign for parents to get involved in their child's video games by playing together. The campaign featured English television and radio personality and former professional footballer, Ian Wright.; As part of the campaign, research was carried out on how children and their parents interact with video games.; For the 2021 festive season, Internet Matters and Electronic Arts worked with comedian Katherine Ryan to encourage parents to set up parental controls on video games consoles before gifting them to their child.; Research: Electronic Arts and Internet Matters worked together to research the impact of the above campaigns, producing a report that showed an increase in parent engagement: "Independent research shows that 55% of parents who saw the campaign acted by switching on parental controls – a truly meaningful and significant change in behaviour. Meanwhile, a staggering 81% of parents are now more likely to talk to their children about being safe online when using their games console, while 75% of parents and carers are more likely to set up parental controls on their child’s games console before giving the console to them in future."

== Website ==
The Internet Matters online portal gives information and guidance about the main e-safety issues children might be exposed to when browsing the internet, as well as safeguarding and parental controls advice.

The portal contains information for parents on the online issues of cyberbullying, inappropriate content, online pornography, online reputation, online grooming, sexting, self-harm, radicalisation and more. The site has published guidance to help parents understand information relevant to their child’s age, the latest in connected technologies, mobile applications, social networking and online gaming.

=== Connecting Safely Online ===
Connecting Safely Online is an initiative to help children and young people with learning difficulties tackle online safety issues. It was launched in 2020 alongside Youthworks and in partnership with Meta.

=== Digital Matters ===
Digital Matters is an online safety learning platform designed for schools, parents, and children to teach children skills in online safety. It was developed with support from Internet Matters' partner, ESET, and uses manga-style art.

It was shortlisted for the Teach Primary 2022 awards in the App category.

== Published research ==
=== Cybersafe (2013) ===
Cybersafe 2013 was a study commissioned to support the launch of Internet Matters. The findings of the study highlighted a clear demand for more information about the risks children face when accessing the internet, at the time of research 74% of parents surveyed stated they wanted to know more. Of the 74%, 18% wanted to learn more about filtering content and blocking access to specific websites.

=== Back to School (2015) ===
Over 1000 UK parents were surveyed to identify at what age they thought a child owning a smartphone was OK. The survey revealed that the majority of parents (84.6%) would like a minimum age on smartphone ownership with 10 being the most popular age.

=== Pace of Change (2015) ===
Internet Matters commissioned Childwise to carry out a UK-wide study to explore the use and understanding of technology among children aged 7–17, and parents of children this age. The research revealed an increasing gap between parents and children online with the fact that children spent significantly longer online, with girls using smartphones on average 4 hours a day.
