= BBC Own It =

Smart device application

The BBC Own It app was a British information site designed to protect and support children using the Internet. The app was launched in 2017 and retired in 2022, though the website retired in 2024 and has since moved to BBC Teach.

As part of the BBC's partnership with Internet Matters, the not-for-profit contributed to content on the BBC Own It website.

== History ==
In 2016, The Royal Foundation of The Duke and Duchess of Cambridge established The Royal Foundation Taskforce on the Prevention of Cyberbullying. Work began in 2017 by the BBC to create an app about cyberbullying and online safety (later titled Own It) in response to a call for action from the Taskforce.

In December 2017, the BBC launched Own It. In November 2018, work on the BBC Own It App was announced by Prince William. In September 2019, the BBC Own It App was launched into the AppStore and Google Play.

In 2022, the BBC discontinued the app, although the website was still active, however in 2024, the website was discontinued, and now any links to the website now redirect to a BBC Teach page.

== Awards ==
- UXUK award for Best Education or Learning Experience (2019)
- Banff World Media Festival Rockies Award for Children & Youth Interactive Content (2020)
- CogX Award for Best Innovation In Natural Language Processing (2020)
