= Christian Order =

British-based monthly magazine

- Editor: Rod Pead
- Former editors: Fr Paul Crane SJ
- Categories: Conservative Catholicism
- Frequency: monthly
- First issue: 1960
- Country: UK
- Based in: UK
- Language: English
- Website: http://www.christianorder.com/
- ISSN: 0009-5559

Christian Order is a British-based monthly magazine for Traditionalist Catholics which was described by John Beaumont of Fidelity magazine in 1996 as "most influential of the conservative Catholic journals in the United Kingdom".

It was originally devoted to the Catholic response to social issues, taking a distributist stance sceptical of the welfare state. In the 1970s a number of contributors were attracted such as George Telford (former vice-chairman and Secretary to the Catechetical Commission of the Bishops of England and Wales) and the lay author Michael Davies.

The magazine's rationale is presented in confrontational terms:

Unless the Church is militant, She cannot thrive and flourish. Thus Christian Order is a militant antidote to the secular "live and let live" attitude which has brought the Church low. For forty years it has embodied that uncompromising spirit demanded by Pope Leo XIII, who contended that in times of necessity each Catholic is "under obligation to show forth his faith to instruct and encourage other of the Faithful" (Sapientiae Christianae).

The Neocatechumenal Way is criticized in the magazine as "heretical" (Lutheran) and a "Trojan horse" in the Church. In an article published in the magazine, CJ O'Hehir described Ireland as "the most anti-Catholic Catholic country in the world, and the most monolithically liberal of the world's democracies." The magazine has republished articles from Daylight, the magazine of the Catholic creationist Daylight Origins Society.

It has been criticised by Searchlight magazine for having among its contributors "extremists" (including John Vennari), a "race-baiter" (E. Michael Jones) and an "antisemitic conspiracist" (Robert Sungenis), and the website Catholic Culture suggests that its contents should be looked at in "a critical light" due to "a bias against Church leaders, Vatican II, and the New Mass."
