= BBC Programme Identifier =

Unique identifier for BBC content

A BBC Programme Identifier (PID) is an alphanumeric, persistent, unique identifier for a television or radio programme brand, a season or series, or an individual episode, used by the BBC in their web URLs, iPlayer viewers, and internal databases.

A PID consists of a lower-case letter, followed by seven or more other characters which may be lower-case letters, or digits. Vowels (a, e, i, o, u) are not used, so that offensive words cannot be generated inadvertently. If the PID begins with the letter "b", this means the content reference identifier (CRID) authority is Red Bee; an opening "p" means that the authority is the BBC's Programme Information Pages (PIPs) database. An "s" is used internally, for PIDs identifying partners and suppliers. Other sources, denoted by different opening letters, could potentially be introduced.

For example, the PID for the radio series The Life Scientific is b015sqc7 and the PID for the individual episode of that show first broadcast on 8 July 2014 is b048l0g3 which is used in its URL.

Every programme ever broadcast by the BBC has its own web page on the BBC Programmes website (https://www.bbc.co.uk/programmes), and the unique PID associated with the programme appears at the end of its web page URL, e.g. https://www.bbc.co.uk/programmes/b04bzv2m

PIDs have been created retrospectively for some programmes from the pre-digital era. An example, in the "p" range, is the PID for the 1956 Desert Island Discs episode featuring Ada Cherry Kearton, p009y95q.

Most PIDs have eight characters, but some past World Service programmes have been given eleven-character PIDs, starting with "w"; an example is wcr5dr3dnl3.

The BBC encourages viewers and listeners to machine tag media relating to programmes, on social sites such as Flickr and their own blog posts, using the relevant PID, in the format bbc:programme=b048l0g3.

PIDs are also used to identify BBC programmes in Wikidata.
