= 2012 St. Louis Rams season =

NFL team season

- Owner: Stan Kroenke
- General manager: Les Snead
- Head coach: Jeff Fisher
- Home stadium: Edward Jones Dome

Results
- Record: 7–8–1
- Division place: 3rd NFC West
- Playoffs: did not qualify
- Pro Bowlers: none

Uniform
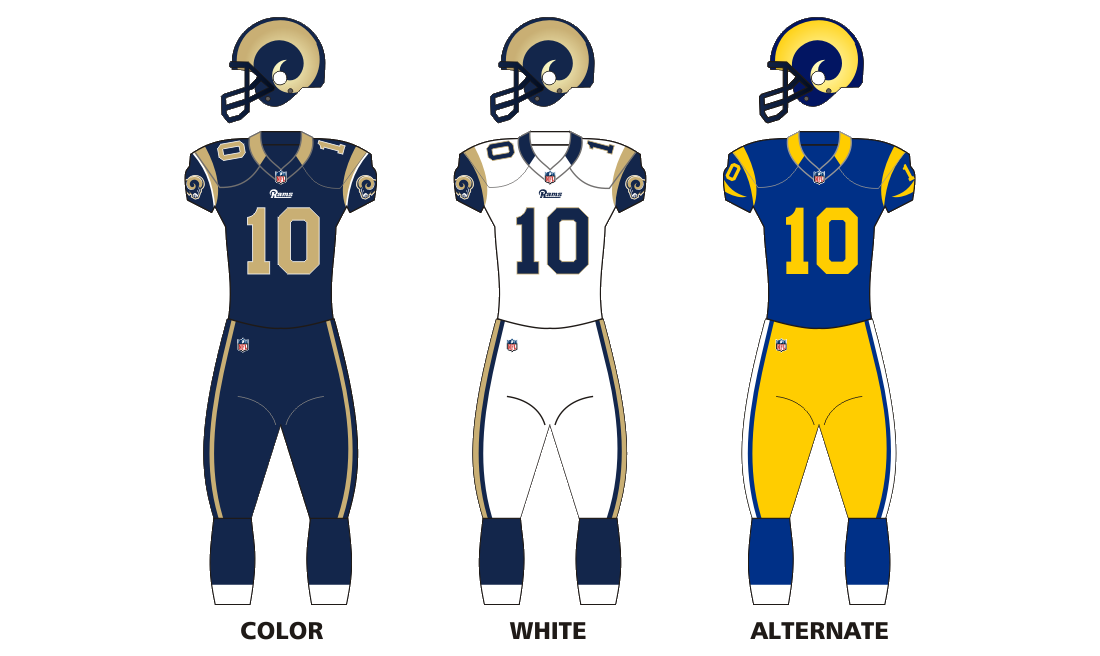

The 2012 season was the St. Louis Rams' 75th in the National Football League (NFL), their 18th in St. Louis and their first under head coach Jeff Fisher. Finishing at 7–8–1, they improved on their 2–14 record from 2011. In Week 10 against the San Francisco 49ers, the game ended in a 24–24 tie, the first since the 2008 NFL season. It was Sam Bradford's second and final full season as the Rams starting quarterback as two torn ACLs sidelined him for much of the next season and the entire 2014 season.

== Personnel changes ==
On January 2, 2012, Rams' owner Stan Kroenke fired head coach Steve Spagnuolo and general manager Billy Devaney after a 2–14 season, and their 10–38 record after three seasons. Former Tennessee Titans head coach Jeff Fisher was signed to be the new head coach and Les Snead was hired to be the new general manager.

== 2012 draft class ==
Round	Selection	Player	Position	College
1	14 ^{[a]}	Michael Brockers	DT	LSU
2	33	Brian Quick	WR	Appalachian State
2	39	Janoris Jenkins	CB	North Alabama
2	50 ^{[b]}	Isaiah Pead	RB	Cincinnati
3	65	Trumaine Johnson	CB	Montana
4	96	Chris Givens	WR	Wake Forest
5	150 ^{[b]}	Rokevious Watkins	OG	South Carolina
6	171	Greg Zuerlein	K	Missouri Western
7	209	Aaron Brown	LB	Hawaii
7	252 ^{[c]}	Daryl Richardson	RB	Abilene Christian

NOTES
^{^[a]} The team traded their original first round pick (#2 overall) to the Washington Redskins for Washington's first and second round picks in 2012, along with Washington's first round picks in 2013 and 2014.
^{^[b]} Rams traded the 45th pick to the Bears for the 50th overall pick and the Bears 5th round pick (#150 overall)
^{^[c]}supplemental compensatory selection

== Staff ==
2012 St. Louis Rams staff
Front office: Owner/chairman – Stan Kroenke; general manager – Les Snead; Executive vice president of football operations/coo – Kevin Demoff; Vice president of player personnel – Mike Williams; Director of player personnel – Lawrence McCutcheon; Director of college scouting – John Mancini; Head coaches: Head coach – Jeff Fisher; Assistant head coach – Dave McGinnis; Offensive coaches: Offensive coordinator – Brian Schottenheimer; Quarterbacks – Frank Cignetti, Jr.; Running backs – Ben Sirmans; Wide receivers – Ray Sherman; Tight ends – Rob Boras; Offensive line – Paul Boudreau; Assistant offensive line – Andy Dickerson; Offensive quality control – Andy Sugarman	Defensive coaches: Defensive coordinator – Gregg Williams†; Defensive line – Mike Waufle; Assistant defensive line – Clyde Simmons; Linebackers – Blake Williams; Assistant linebackers – Joe Bowden; Defensive backs – Chuck Cecil; Assistant defensive backs – Brandon Fisher; Defensive quality control – Dennard Wilson; Special teams coaches: Special teams coordinator – John Fassel; Assistant special teams coordinator – Paul Boudreau, Jr.; Strength and conditioning: Strength and conditioning – Rock Gullickson; Assistant strength and conditioning – Adam Bailey; † – suspended for the 2012 season (see New Orleans Saints bounty scandal)

== Final roster ==
2012 St. Louis Rams roster
Quarterbacks (QB): 8 Sam Bradford; 10 Kellen Clemens; 9 Austin Davis; Running backs (RB): 42 Terrance Ganaway; 46 Cory Harkey FB; 39 Steven Jackson; 24 Isaiah Pead; 26 Daryl Richardson; Wide receivers (WR): 16 Danny Amendola PR; 11 Brandon Gibson; 13 Chris Givens KR; 18 Austin Pettis; 83 Brian Quick; 12 Steve Smith; Tight ends (TE): 88 Lance Kendricks; 89 Mike McNeill; 82 Matthew Mulligan	Offensive linemen (OL): 68 Joe Barksdale T; 61 Tim Barnes C; 72 Wayne Hunter T; 79 Barry Richardson T; 76 Rodger Saffold T; 66 Shelley Smith G; 59 Rob Turner C/G; 63 Scott Wells C; 65 Chris Williams G/T; Defensive linemen (DL): 90 Michael Brockers DT; 71 Matthew Conrath DT; 93 Jermelle Cudjo DT; 95 William Hayes DE; 98 Kendall Langford DT; 91 Chris Long DE; 94 Robert Quinn DE; 92 Eugene Sims DE	Linebackers (LB): 57 Sammy Brown OLB; 52 Justin Cole OLB; 58 Jo-Lonn Dunbar OLB; 51 Mario Haggan OLB; 56 Josh Hull MLB; 55 James Laurinaitis MLB; 50 Rocky McIntosh OLB; Defensive backs (DB): 43 Craig Dahl FS; 31 Cortland Finnegan CB; 32 Bradley Fletcher CB; 21 Janoris Jenkins CB; 22 Trumaine Johnson CB; 23 Rodney McLeod FS; 27 Quintin Mikell SS; 33 Quinton Pointer CB; 20 Darian Stewart SS; Special teams (ST): 6 Johnny Hekker P; 44 Jake McQuaide LS; 4 Greg Zuerlein K	Practice squad: 77 Mason Brodine DE; 81 Cameron Graham TE; 14 Nick Johnson WR; 60 Ty Nsekhe T; 84 Raymond Radway WR; 34 Chase Reynolds RB; 70 Brandon Washington G; 54 Jabara Williams LB; Reserve: 62 Harvey Dahl G (IR); 37 Matt Daniels SS (IR); 99 Trevor Laws DT (IR); 73 Rokevious Watkins G (IR); Rookies in italics 53 active, 4 reserve, 8 practice squad

== Schedule ==
=== Preseason ===
Week	Date	Opponent	Result	Record	Venue	Recap
1	August 12	at Indianapolis Colts	**L** 3–38	0–1	Lucas Oil Stadium	Recap
2	August 18	Kansas City Chiefs	**W** 31–17	1–1	Edward Jones Dome	Recap
3	August 25	at Dallas Cowboys	**L** 19–20	1–2	Cowboys Stadium	Recap
4	August 30	Baltimore Ravens	**W** 31–17	2–2	Edward Jones Dome	Recap

=== Regular season ===
Week	Date	Opponent	Result	Record	Venue	Recap
1	September 9	at Detroit Lions	**L** 23–27	0–1	Ford Field	Recap
2	September 16	Washington Redskins	**W** 31–28	1–1	Edward Jones Dome	Recap
3	September 23	at Chicago Bears	**L** 6–23	1–2	Soldier Field	Recap
4	September 30	**Seattle Seahawks**	**W** 19–13	2–2	Edward Jones Dome	Recap
5	October 4	**Arizona Cardinals**	**W** 17–3	3–2	Edward Jones Dome	Recap
6	October 14	at Miami Dolphins	**L** 14–17	3–3	Sun Life Stadium	Recap
7	October 21	Green Bay Packers	**L** 20–30	3–4	Edward Jones Dome	Recap
8	October 28	New England Patriots	**L** 7–45	3–5	(United Kingdom) Wembley Stadium (London)	Recap
9	Bye					
10	November 11	at **San Francisco 49ers**	**T** 24–24	3–5–1	Candlestick Park	Recap
11	November 18	New York Jets	**L** 13–27	3–6–1	Edward Jones Dome	Recap
12	November 25	at **Arizona Cardinals**	**W** 31–17	4–6–1	University of Phoenix Stadium	Recap
13	December 2	**San Francisco 49ers**	**W** 16–13	5–6–1	Edward Jones Dome	Recap
14	December 9	at Buffalo Bills	**W** 15–12	6–6–1	Ralph Wilson Stadium	Recap
15	December 16	Minnesota Vikings	**L** 22–36	6–7–1	Edward Jones Dome	Recap
16	December 23	at Tampa Bay Buccaneers	**W** 28–13	7–7–1	Raymond James Stadium	Recap
17	December 30	at **Seattle Seahawks**	**L** 13–20	7–8–1	CenturyLink Field	Recap

Note: Intra-division opponents are in bold text.

=== Game summaries ===
==== Week 1: at Detroit Lions ====
Week One: St. Louis Rams at Detroit Lions – Game summary

Quarter	1	2	3	4	Total
Rams	3	10	0	10	**23**
**Lions**	0	10	3	14	**27**

at Ford Field, Detroit

- Date: September 9
- Game time: 1:00 p.m. EDT/12:00 p.m. CDT
- Game weather: Played indoors (dome stadium)
- Game attendance: 62,315
- Referee: Donovan Briggans
- TV announcers (Fox): Chris Myers, Tim Ryan and Jaime Maggio

Game information

**First quarter**

- STL – Greg Zuerlein 48-yard field goal, Rams 3–0, **Drive: 10 plays, 36 yards, 5:49.**

**Second quarter**

- DET – Joique Bell 1-yard run (Jason Hanson kick), Lions 7–3, **Drive: 14 plays, 80 yards, 7:31.**
- STL – Greg Zuerlein 29-yard field goal, Lions 7–6, **Drive: 8 plays, 43 yards, 4:30.**
- STL – Cortland Finnegan 31-yard interception return (Greg Zuerlein kick), Rams 13–7, **Drive: 1 play, 31 yards, 0:00.**
- DET – Jason Hanson 41-yard field goal, Rams 13–10, **Drive: 5 plays, 53 yards, 1:08.**

**Third quarter**

- DET – Jason Hanson 45-yard field goal, Tied 13–13, **Drive: 5 plays, 15 yards, 2:54.**

**Fourth quarter**

- STL – Brandon Gibson 23-yard pass from Sam Bradford (Greg Zuerlein kick), Rams 20–13, **Drive: 5 plays, 47 yards, 2:42.**
- DET – Kevin Smith 5-yard run (Jason Hanson kick), Tied 20–20, **Drive: 5 plays, 80 yards, 2:26.**
- STL – Greg Zuerlein 46-yard field goal, Rams 23–20, **Drive: 13 plays, 52 yards, 5:24.**
- DET – Kevin Smith 5-yard pass from Matthew Stafford (Jason Hanson kick), Lions 27–23, **Drive: 9 plays, 80 yards, 1:45.**

**Top passers**

- STL – Sam Bradford – 17/25, 198 yards, 1 touchdown
- DET – Matthew Stafford – 32/48, 355 yards, 1 touchdown, 3 interceptions

**Top rushers**

- STL – Steven Jackson – 21 carries, 53 yards
- DET – Kevin Smith – 13 carries, 52 yards, 1 touchdown

**Top receivers**

- STL – Danny Amendola – 5 receptions, 70 yards
- DET – Calvin Johnson – 6 receptions, 111 yards

**Top tacklers**

- STL – Cortland Finnegan – 9 tackles, 1 assist, 1 interception, 1 touchdown
- DET – Justin Durant – 7 tackles, 5 assists

The Rams started their season on the road against the Lions. The Rams drew first blood in the first quarter with a 48-yard field goal from Greg Zuerlein to take a 3–0 lead for the only score of that quarter. The Lions then took a 7–3 lead with Joique Bell's 1-yard run for a touchdown in the 2nd quarter. The Rams responded with a 29-yard field goal from Zuerlein as they came up within a point 7–6 before on the Lions' next possession, Matthew Stafford was picked off by Cortland Finnegan and it was returned 31 yards for a touchdown as the Rams retook the lead 13–7. The Lions then responded with Jason Hanson kicking a 41-yard field goal to shorten the Rams' lead to 13–10 at halftime. After the break, the Lions scored first with Jason Hanson kicking a 45-yard field goal to tie the game 13–13 for the only score of the 3rd quarter. However, the Rams moved back into the lead in the 4th quarter with Brandon Gibson's 23-yard catch from Sam Bradford to make it 20–13. The Lions tied the game back up with Kevin Smith running for a touchdown from 5 yards out to tie the game 20–20. The Rams then retook the lead with Greg Zuerlein kicking a 46-yard field goal to make the score 23–20. On their last possession, the Lions moved down the field and Matthew Stafford found Kevin Smith on a 5-yard touchdown pass to make the final score 27–23 as the Rams began their season 0–1.

==== Week 2: vs. Washington Redskins ====
Week Two: Washington Redskins at St. Louis Rams – Game summary

Quarter	1	2	3	4	Total
Redskins	14	7	7	0	**28**
**Rams**	3	13	7	8	**31**

at Edward Jones Dome, St. Louis, Missouri

- Date: September 17
- Game time: 3:05 pm. CDT
- Game weather: Played indoors (dome stadium)
- Game attendance: 53,979
- Referee: Wayne Elliott
- TV announcers (Fox): Chris Myers, Tim Ryan and Jaime Maggio

Game information

**First quarter**

**Second quarter**

**Third quarter**

**Fourth quarter**

**Top passers**

- WAS –
- STL –

**Top rushers**

- WAS –
- STL –

**Top receivers**

- WAS –
- STL –

**Top tacklers**

- WAS –
- STL –

After a tough loss, the Rams returned home for a game against the Redskins. With the win, the team improved to 1–1. Before the game, the Rams were fined $20,000 for not reporting Steven Jackson's injury.

==== Week 3: at Chicago Bears ====
Week Three: St. Louis Rams at Chicago Bears – Game summary

Quarter	1	2	3	4	Total
Rams	0	3	3	0	**6**
**Bears**	3	7	0	13	**23**

at Soldier Field, Chicago

- Date: September 23
- Game time: 12:00 pm. CDT
- Game weather: 56 °F (13 °C), partly cloudy
- Game attendance: 62,224
- Referee: Jerry Hughes
- TV announcers (Fox): Dick Stockton, John Lynch and Jennifer Hale

Game information

**First quarter**

- CHI – Robbie Gould 54-yd FG (CHI 3–0)

**Second quarter**

- CHI -Michael Bush 3-yd run (CHI 10–0)
- STL – Greg Zuerlein 56-yd FG (CHI 10–3)

**Third quarter**

- STL – Greg Zuerlein 46-yd FG (10–6)

**Fourth quarter**

- CHI – Robbie Gould 22-yd FG (CHI 13–6)
- CHI – Major Wright 45-yd interception return (CHI 20–6)
- CHI – Robbie Gould 37-yd FG (CHI 23–6)

**Top passers**

- STL – Sam Bradford – 18/35, 152 yds, 2 INT
- CHI – Jay Cutler – 17/31, 183 yds, 1 INT

**Top rushers**

- STL – Steven Jackson – 11 car, 29 yds
- CHI – Michael Bush – 18 car, 55 yds, 1 TD

**Top receivers**

- STL – Danny Amendola – 5 rec, 66 yds
- CHI – Brandon Marshall – 5 rec, 71 yds

**Top tacklers**

- STL – James Laurinaitis – 11 tackles
- CHI – Lance Briggs – 7 tackles

After defeating the Redskins at home, the Rams traveled on the road against the Bears. The Bears scored first in the first quarter with a 54-yard field goal from Robbie Gould to take a 3–0 lead for the only score of the quarter. In the 2nd quarter, the Bears increased their lead when Michael Bush scored a touchdown on a 5-yard run to make the score 10–0. The Rams responded with Greg Zuerlein's 56-yard field goal to shorten the lead to 10–3 at halftime. In the 3rd quarter, the Rams drew closer as Zuerlein kicked a 46-yard field goal to make the score 10–6 for the only score of the quarter. But in the 4th quarter, the Bears held on for victory as Gould kicked a 22-yard field goal to make it 13–6 and then on the Rams' next possession, Sam Bradford was intercepted by Major Wright who then returned it 45 yards for a touchdown to make it 20–6. Gould kicked a 37-yard field goal to make the final score 23–6 as the Rams dropped to 1–2.

==== Week 4: vs. Seattle Seahawks ====
Week Four: Seattle Seahawks at St. Louis Rams – Game summary

Quarter	1	2	3	4	Total
Seahawks	7	0	3	3	**13**
**Rams**	3	10	3	3	**19**

at Edward Jones Dome, St. Louis, Missouri

- Date: September 30
- Game time: 12:00 pm. CDT
- Game weather: Played indoors (dome stadium)
- Game attendance: 53,193
- Referee: Mike Carey
- TV announcers (Fox): Ron Pitts, Mike Martz and Kristina Pink

Game information

**First quarter**

- SEA- Marshawn Lynch, 17-yard run, Steve Hauschka XP good 10:45 (SEA 7–0)
- STL- Greg Zuerlein 58-yard field goal 4:59 (SEA 7–3)

**Second quarter**

- STL- Danny Amendola, 2-yard pass from John Hekker, Greg Zuerlein XP good 1:16 (STL 10–7)
- STL- Greg Zuerlein, 48-yard field goal, 0:03 (STL 13–7)

**Third quarter**

- STL- Greg Zuerlein, 60-yard field goal, 13:46 (STL 16–7)
- SEA- Steve Hauschka, 31-yard field goal, 4:14 (STL 16–10)

**Fourth quarter**

- SEA- Steve Hauschka, 30-yard field goal, 13:08 (STL 16–13)
- STL- Greg Zuerlein, 24-yard field goal, 6:07 (STL 19–13)

**Top passers**

- SEA –
- STL –

**Top rushers**

- SEA –
- STL –

**Top receivers**

- SEA –
- STL –

**Top tacklers**

- SEA –
- STL –

With the win, the Rams improved to 2–2, And 2–0 in home games.

==== Week 5: vs. Arizona Cardinals ====
Week Five: Arizona Cardinals at St. Louis Rams – Game summary

Quarter	1	2	3	4	Total
Cardinals	3	0	0	0	**3**
**Rams**	7	3	0	7	**17**

at Edward Jones Dome, St. Louis, Missouri

- Date: October 4
- Game time: 7:20 pm. CDT
- Game weather: Played indoors (dome stadium)
- Game attendance: 54,653
- Referee: John Parry
- TV announcers (NFLN): Brad Nessler, Mike Mayock and Alex Flanagan

Game information

**First quarter**

**Second quarter**

**Third quarter**

**Fourth quarter**

**Top passers**

- ARI – Kevin Kolb - 28/50, 289 yards
- STL – Sam Bradford - 7/21, 141 yards, 2 TD, Int

**Top rushers**

- ARI – Ryan Williams - 14 Rushes, 33 yards
- STL – Steven Jackson - 18 Rushes, 76 yards

**Top receivers**

- ARI – Larry Fitzgerald - 8 rec, 92 yards
- STL – Danny Amendola - 1 rec, 44 yards

**Top tacklers**

- ARI –
- STL –

With the win, the Rams improved to 3–2. This was also the first time since 2006 the Rams were at least a game above .500. The team was 3–0 at home and 0–2 in road games at this point of the season.

==== Week 6: at Miami Dolphins ====
Week Six: St. Louis Rams at Miami Dolphins – Game summary

Quarter	1	2	3	4	Total
Rams	6	0	0	8	**14**
**Dolphins**	0	10	7	0	**17**

at Sun Life Stadium, Miami Gardens, Florida

- Date: October 14
- Game time: 1:00 pm. EDT/12:00 pm. CDT
- Game weather: 84 °F (29 °C), cloudy
- Game attendance: 52,983
- Referee: Gene Steratore
- TV announcers (Fox): Chris Myers, Tim Ryan and Jaime Maggio

Game information

**First quarter**

- STL- Greg Zuerlein, 48-yard field goal, 12:49 (STL 3–0)

**Second quarter** **Third quarter** **Fourth quarter**

**Top passers**

- STL –
- MIA –

**Top rushers**

- STL –
- MIA –

**Top receivers**

- STL –
- MIA –

**Top tacklers**

- STL –
- MIA –

With the loss, the Rams fell to 3–3. With the Seahawks' win over the Patriots, the Rams were at the bottom of the NFC West. The team was also 0–3 in road games.

==== Week 7: vs. Green Bay Packers ====
Week Seven: Green Bay Packers at St. Louis Rams – Game summary

Quarter	1	2	3	4	Total
**Packers**	10	0	7	13	**30**
Rams	3	3	0	14	**20**

at Edward Jones Dome, St. Louis, Missouri

- Date: October 21
- Game time: 12:00 pm. CDT
- Game weather: Played indoors (dome stadium)
- Game attendance: 64,359
- Referee: Bill Vinovich
- TV announcers (Fox): Sam Rosen, Brian Billick and Laura Okmin

Game information

**First quarter**

**Second quarter**

**Third quarter**

**Fourth quarter**

**Top passers**

- GB –
- STL –

**Top rushers**

- GB –
- STL –

**Top receivers**

- GB –
- STL –

**Top tacklers**

- GB –
- STL –

With the loss, the Rams fell to 3–4 and suffered their first home loss of the season.

==== Week 8: vs. New England Patriots ====
International Series

Week Eight: New England Patriots at St. Louis Rams – Game summary

Quarter	1	2	3	4	Total
**Patriots**	7	21	10	7	**45**
Rams	7	0	0	0	**7**

at Wembley Stadium, London

- Date: October 28
- Game time: 5:00 p.m. GMT/12:00 pm. CDT
- Game weather: 49 °F (9 °C), partly cloudy
- Game attendance: 84,004
- Referee: Walt Coleman
- TV announcers (CBS): Jim Nantz and Phil Simms

Game information

**First quarter**

**Second quarter**

**Third quarter**

**Fourth quarter**

**Top passers**

- NE –
- STL –

**Top rushers**

- NE –
- STL –

**Top receivers**

- NE –
- STL –

**Top tacklers**

- NE –
- STL –

With the loss, the Rams fell to 3–5 on the season. In this rematch of Super Bowl XXXVI, the Rams traveled to London and were considered the home team in the 2012 International Series. The Rams' struggles continued as the team lost to the Patriots 45–7 heading into their bye week. Patriots quarterback Tom Brady was able to have his way against the Rams' secondary, throwing touchdowns to four different Patriot wide receivers including two to ex-Ram Brandon Lloyd.

==== Week 10: at San Francisco 49ers ====
Week Ten: St. Louis Rams at San Francisco 49ers – Game summary

Quarter	1	2	3	4	OT	Total
Rams	14	0	3	7	0	**24**
49ers	0	7	0	17	0	**24**

at Candlestick Park, San Francisco

- Date: November 11
- Game time: 3:25 pm. CST/1:25 p.m. PST
- Game weather: 55 °F (13 °C), sunny
- Game attendance: 69,732
- Referee: Clete Blakeman
- TV announcers (Fox): Chris Myers, Tim Ryan and Jaime Maggio

Game information

**First quarter**

**Second quarter**

**Third quarter**

**Fourth quarter**

**Top passers**

- STL –
- SF –

**Top rushers**

- STL –
- SF –

**Top receivers**

- STL –
- SF –

**Top tacklers**

- STL –
- SF –

With their 3-game losing streak snapped, the Rams' record stood at 3–5–1 after the game ended in a 24–24 tie. This was the first NFL tie game since 2008 when the Bengals and Eagles played to a 13–13 tie game. It was also the first tie between the Rams and 49ers since 1968 when both teams played to a 20–20 tie game while the Rams were still in Los Angeles, thus this was the first tie game between the Rams based in St. Louis and the 49ers.

==== Week 11: vs. New York Jets ====
Week Eleven: New York Jets at St. Louis Rams – Game summary

Quarter	1	2	3	4	Total
**Jets**	3	10	0	14	**27**
Rams	7	0	0	6	**13**

at Edward Jones Dome, St. Louis, Missouri

- Date: November 18
- Game time: 12:00 pm. CST
- Game weather: Played indoors (dome stadium)
- Game attendance: 57,711
- Referee: Jerome Boger
- TV announcers (CBS): Ian Eagle and Dan Fouts

Game information

**First quarter**

**Second quarter**

**Third quarter**

**Fourth quarter**

**Top passers**

- NYJ –
- STL –

**Top rushers**

- NYJ –
- STL –

**Top receivers**

- NYJ –
- STL –

**Top tacklers**

- NYJ –
- STL –

With the loss, the Rams fell to 3–6–1. After going 3–0 in their first 3 home games, their home record dropped to 3–3.

==== Week 12: at Arizona Cardinals ====
Week Twelve: St. Louis Rams at Arizona Cardinals – Game summary

Quarter	1	2	3	4	Total
**Rams**	0	14	14	3	**31**
Cardinals	7	10	0	0	**17**

at University of Phoenix Stadium, Glendale, Arizona

- Date: November 25
- Game time: 3:25 pm. CST/2:25 p.m. MST
- Game weather: Played indoors (retractable roof closed)
- Game attendance: 60,062
- Referee: Tony Corrente
- TV announcers (Fox): Dick Stockton, John Lynch and Jennifer Hale

Game information

**First quarter**

**Second quarter**

**Third quarter**

**Fourth quarter**

**Top passers**

- STL –
- ARI –

**Top rushers**

- STL –
- ARI –

**Top receivers**

- STL –
- ARI –

**Top tacklers**

- STL –
- ARI –

With the win, the Rams improved to 4–6–1, won their first road game of the season and swept the Cardinals for the first time since 2003.

==== Week 13: vs. San Francisco 49ers ====
Week Thirteen: San Francisco 49ers at St. Louis Rams – Game summary

Quarter	1	2	3	4	OT	Total
49ers	7	0	0	6	0	**13**
**Rams**	0	0	2	11	3	**16**

at Edward Jones Dome, St. Louis, Missouri

- Date: December 2
- Game time: 12:00 pm. CST
- Game weather: Played indoors (dome stadium)
- Game attendance: 57,279
- Referee: Carl Cheffers
- TV announcers (Fox): Kenny Albert, Daryl Johnston and Tony Siragusa

Game information

**First quarter**

**Second quarter**

**Third quarter**

**Fourth quarter**

**Top passers**

- SF –
- STL –

**Top rushers**

- SF –
- STL –

**Top receivers**

- SF –
- STL –

**Top tacklers**

- SF –
- STL –

With the win, the Rams improved to 5–6–1. After going into OT with the 49ers for the second time during the season, the Rams once again faced the threat of a tie. However kicker Greg Zuerlein kicked a 54-yard field goal to seal the win for the Rams.

==== Week 14: at Buffalo Bills ====
Week Fourteen: St. Louis Rams at Buffalo Bills – Game summary

Quarter	1	2	3	4	Total
**Rams**	0	0	7	8	**15**
Bills	3	3	6	0	**12**

at Ralph Wilson Stadium, Orchard Park, New York

- Date: December 9
- Game time: 1:00 pm. EST/12:00 pm. CST
- Game weather: 37 °F (3 °C), cloudy
- Game attendance: 68,109
- Referee: Gene Steratore
- TV announcers (Fox): Ron Pitts, Mike Martz and Krista Voda

Game information

**First quarter**

**Second quarter**

**Third quarter**

**Fourth quarter**

**Top passers**

- STL –
- BUF –

**Top rushers**

- STL –
- BUF –

**Top receivers**

- STL –
- BUF –

**Top tacklers**

- STL –
- BUF –

With the road win, the Rams improved their record to 6–6–1. The win was attributed to a late fourth quarter comeback drive by Rams quarterback Sam Bradford. The drive resulted in a touchdown reception by Brandon Gibson, bringing the score to 13–12. The Rams then scored a 2-point conversion on a quick pass to Danny Amendola, making the score 15–12 Rams. With under 2 minutes left in the game, the Bills attempted a comeback of their own, but came up short in what resulted in the Rams win.

==== Week 15: vs. Minnesota Vikings ====
Week Fifteen: Minnesota Vikings at St. Louis Rams – Game summary

Quarter	1	2	3	4	Total
**Vikings**	7	23	3	3	**36**
Rams	0	7	0	15	**22**

at Edward Jones Dome, St. Louis, Missouri

- Date: December 16
- Game time: 12:00 pm. CST
- Game weather: Played indoors (dome stadium)
- Game attendance: 55,751
- Referee: Alberto Riveron
- TV announcers (Fox): Gus Johnson, Charles Davis and Kristina Pink

Game information

**First quarter**

**Second quarter**

**Third quarter**

**Fourth quarter**

**Top passers**

- MIN –
- STL –

**Top rushers**

- MIN –
- STL –

**Top receivers**

- MIN –
- STL –

**Top tacklers**

- MIN –
- STL –

With the loss, the Rams fell to a 6–7–1 record on the season. The Rams' loss came due to a stellar, over 200 yards rushing performance by Vikings running back Adrian Peterson, and by early mistakes by the Rams' offense. During the game, Steven Jackson rushed for 73 yards, making him the 27th player in NFL history to reach 10,000 rushing yards in his career.

==== Week 16: at Tampa Bay Buccaneers ====
Week Sixteen: St. Louis Rams at Tampa Bay Buccaneers – Game summary

Quarter	1	2	3	4	Total
**Rams**	0	14	14	0	**28**
Buccaneers	3	3	7	0	**13**

at Raymond James Stadium, Tampa, Florida

- Date: December 23
- Game time: 1:00 pm. EST/12:00 pm. CST
- Game weather: 59 °F (15 °C), cloudy
- Game attendance: 51,535
- Referee: Scott Green
- TV announcers (Fox): Ron Pitts, Mike Martz and Krista Voda

Game information

**First quarter**

**Second quarter**

**Third quarter**

**Fourth quarter**

**Top passers**

- STL –
- TB –

**Top rushers**

- STL –
- TB –

**Top receivers**

- STL –
- TB –

**Top tacklers**

- STL –
- TB –

Despite the win, the Rams were officially eliminated from playoff contention due to the Vikings 23–6 win over the Texans, but aimed to finish with a winning record for the first time since 2004 with a win at Seattle at next week

==== Week 17: at Seattle Seahawks ====
Week Seventeen: St. Louis Rams at Seattle Seahawks – Game summary

Quarter	1	2	3	4	Total
Rams	0	7	3	3	**13**
**Seahawks**	0	3	10	7	**20**

at CenturyLink Field, Seattle

- Date: December 30
- Game time: 3:25 pm. CST/1:25 pm. PST
- Game weather: 41 °F (5 °C), sunny
- Game attendance: 67,936
- Referee: Jeff Triplette
- TV announcers (Fox): Chris Myers, Tim Ryan and Jaime Maggio

Game information

**First quarter**

**Second quarter**

**Third quarter**

**Fourth quarter**

**Top passers**

- STL –
- SEA –

**Top rushers**

- STL –
- SEA –

**Top receivers**

- STL –
- SEA –

**Top tacklers**

- STL –
- SEA –

After winning over the Buccaneers, the Rams traveled up to Seattle to take on the Seahawks with a division record of 4–0–1. The Seahawks defeated the Rams and hand the team their only divisional loss of the season. The Rams finished 7–8–1, their 6th straight losing season dating back to 2007 and their 9th straight non-winning season dating back to 2004.

== Standings ==
NFC West
	W	L	T	PCT	DIV	CONF	PF	PA	STK
^{(2)} San Francisco 49ers	11	4	1	.719	3–2–1	7–4–1	397	273	W1
^{(5)} Seattle Seahawks	11	5	0	.688	3–3	8–4	412	245	W5
St. Louis Rams	7	8	1	.469	4–1–1	6–5–1	299	348	L1
Arizona Cardinals	5	11	0	.313	1–5	3–9	250	357	L2
