= Rodney McLeod =

American football player (born 1990)

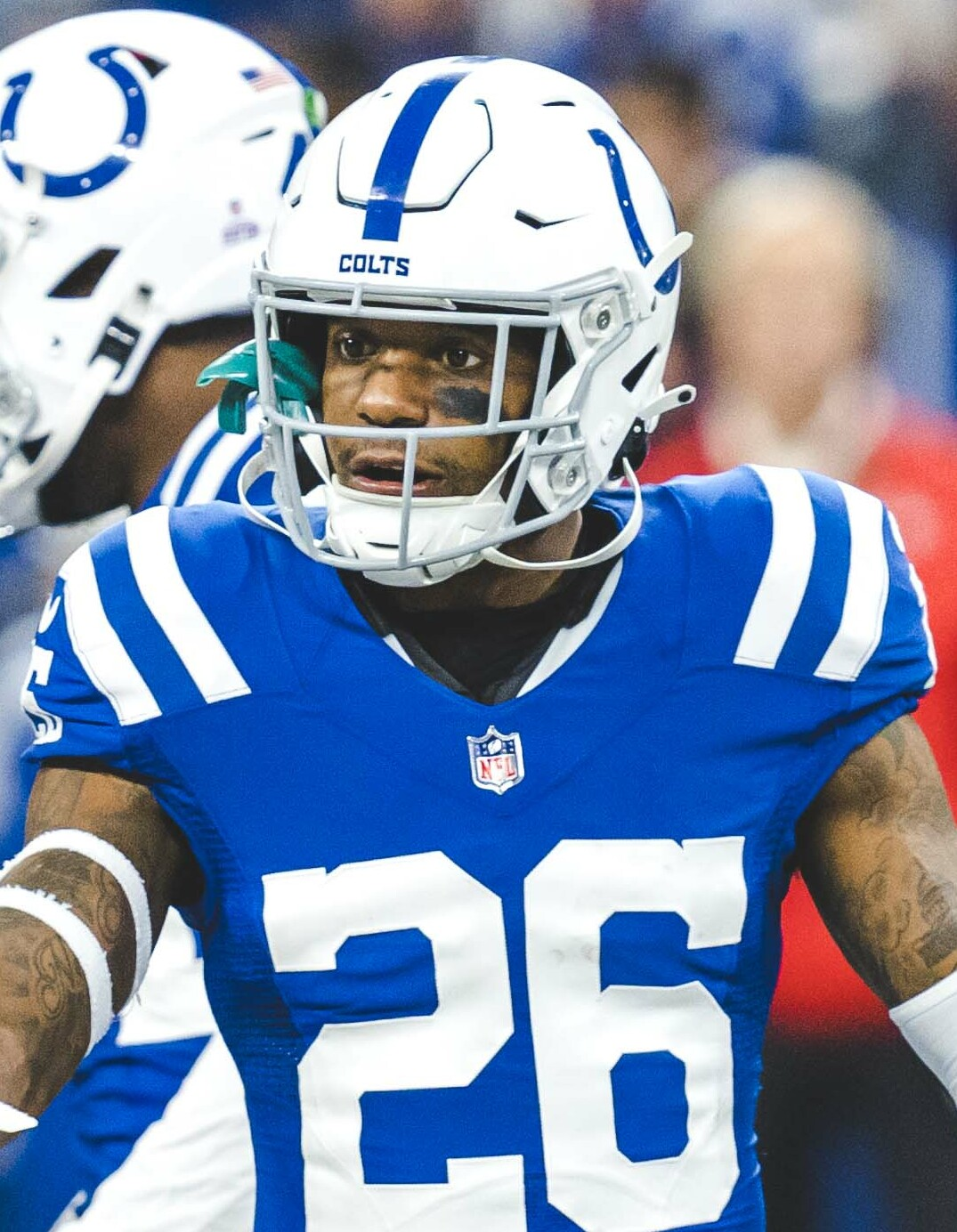
- McLeod playing for the Indianapolis Colts in 2022

No. 23, 26, 12
- Position: Safety

Personal information
- Born: June 23, 1990 (age 36); Clinton, Maryland, U.S.
- Listed height: 5 ft 10 in (1.78 m)
- Listed weight: 185 lb (84 kg)

Career information
- High school: DeMatha Catholic (Hyattsville, Maryland)
- College: Virginia (2008–2011)
- NFL draft: 2012: undrafted

Career history
- St. Louis Rams (2012–2015); Philadelphia Eagles (2016–2021); Indianapolis Colts (2022); Cleveland Browns (2023–2024)

Awards and highlights
- Super Bowl champion (LII)

Career NFL statistics
- Total tackles: 757
- Sacks: 2.0
- Forced fumbles: 11
- Fumble recoveries: 10
- Pass deflections: 66
- Interceptions: 18
- Touchdowns: 5
- Stats at Pro Football Reference

Rodney McLeod Jr. (born June 23, 1990) is an American former professional football player who was a safety for 13 seasons in the National Football League (NFL). McLeod played college football for the Virginia Cavaliers and signed with the St. Louis Rams as an undrafted free agent in 2012. He has also played for the Philadelphia Eagles, with whom he won a Super Bowl in 2017, the Indianapolis Colts and the Cleveland Browns.

== Early life ==
McLeod attended DeMatha Catholic High School in Hyattsville, Maryland where he played as a safety.

Considered a three-star recruit by 247Sports.com, he chose Virginia over Syracuse and Virginia Tech.

== College career ==
McLeod played college football for Virginia. He finished all four years with 190 tackles, six interceptions, one sack, 17 pass deflections, and three forced fumbles.

== Professional career ==
Pre-draft measurables
Height	Weight	40-yard dash	10-yard split	20-yard split	20-yard shuttle	Three-cone drill	Vertical jump	Broad jump	Bench press
5 ft 9 3/4 in (1.77 m)	183 lb (83 kg)	4.60 s	1.55 s	2.63 s	4.12 s	6.50 s	36.5 in (0.93 m)	10 ft 1 in (3.07 m)	15 reps
All values from Virginia's Pro Day

=== St. Louis Rams ===
==== 2012 ====
On April 30, 2012, the St. Louis Rams signed McLeod to a three-year, $1.44 million contract after he went undrafted during the 2012 NFL draft.

Throughout training camp, McLeod competed for a roster spot as a backup safety against Matt Daniels and Quinton Pointer. He progressed quickly and earned an opportunity to show his athleticism after Daniels missed the majority of camp with an injury. McLeod's quick rise up the depth chart continued in the preseason after he led the Rams with 12 combined tackles and earned reps ahead of Darian Stewart at strong safety during practice. Head coach Jeff Fisher named McLeod the backup free safety behind Quintin Mikell to begin the regular season.

He made his professional regular season debut in the Rams' season-opener at the Detroit Lions and recorded two solo tackles in their 27–23 loss. McLeod's first career tackle was on Lions' running back Stefan Logan after Logan returned a kick for 13-yards. On November 11, 2012, he tied his season-high of two solo tackles in the Rams' 24–24 tie at the San Francisco 49ers. During this game he caught his only offensive pass on a fake punt for 21 yards. He finished his rookie season in 2012 with 13 combined tackles (nine solo) in 16 games and zero starts. McLeod also led the Rams with 16 special teams tackles as a rookie.

==== 2013 ====
McLeod entered training camp competing for a job as a starting safety after Quintin Mikell was released and Craig Dahl departed in free agency. He competed against Darian Stewart, Matt Daniels, and Matt Giordano. Head coach Jeff Fisher named McLeod the starting strong safety after Darian Stewart missed the preseason and first three games due to a soft tissue injury. He was paired with starting free safety T. J. McDonald.

On September 8, 2013, McLeod earned his first career start in the St. Louis Rams' home-opener against the Arizona Cardinals and recorded five combined tackles (three solo) during their 27–24 victory. The following week, he set a season-high with seven solo tackles during a 31–24 loss at the Atlanta Falcons in Week 2. On November 3, 2013, McLeod registered seven combined tackles (six solo), broke up a pass, and made the first interception of his career off a pass attempt by quarterback Jake Locker during the Rams' 28–21 loss to the Tennessee Titans. On November 24, 2013, McLeod made six solo tackles, set a season-high with two pass deflections, and intercepted a pass attempt Josh McCown threw to Alshon Jeffery as the Rams routed the Chicago Bears 21—42. In Week 15, he set a season-high with eight combined tackles (six solo) as the Rams lost 27–16 to the New Orleans Saints. He finished his first season as a starter with 79 combined tackles (63 solo), seven pass deflections, and two interceptions in 16 games and 16 starts. McLeod started the first ten games at both free safety and strong safety as a replacement for the injured T.J. McDonald and Darian Stewart, but officially earned the starting role over Stewart in Week 12.

==== 2014 ====
The St. Louis Rams hired Gregg Williams as their new defensive coordinator after they opted not to re-sign Tim Walton. McLeod entered training camp slated to takeover as the starting free safety. Head coach Jeff Fisher named McLeod and T. J. McDonald the starting safeties to begin the regular season.

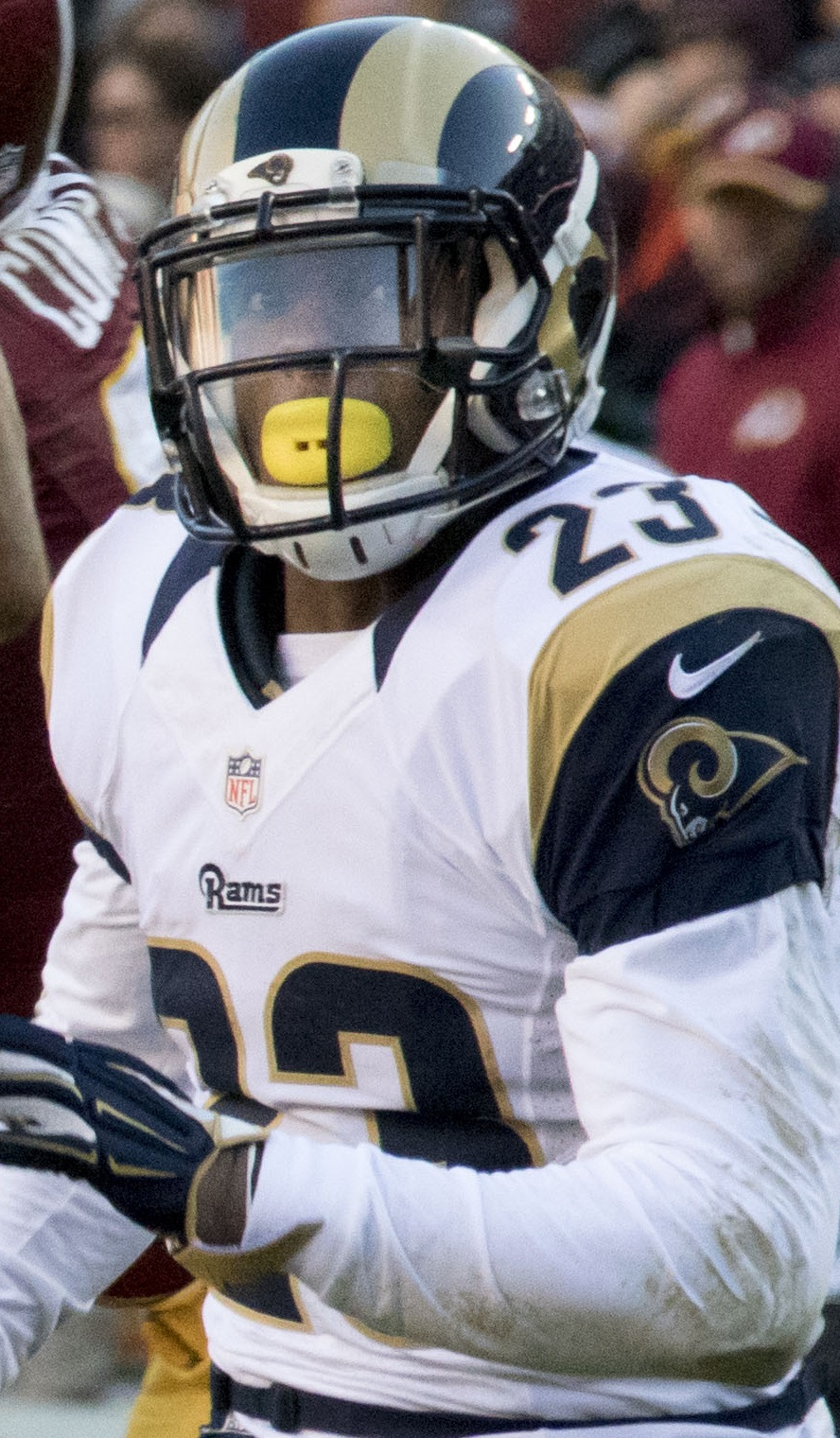
McLeod in a game against the Washington Redskins in 2014.

On September 7, 2014, McLeod started in the Rams' home-opener against the Minnesota Vikings and set a season-high with seven combined tackles (six solo) as they lost 34–6. The following week, McLeod made five solo tackles and intercepted a pass by quarterback Jameis Winston in the Rams' 19–17 win at the Tampa Bay Buccaneers. He finished the 2014 season with 72 combined tackles (62 solo), six pass deflections, and two interceptions in 16 games and 16 starts.

==== 2015 ====
McLeod became a restricted free agent after the 2014 season after completing his three-year rookie contract. On March 6, 2015, the St. Louis Rams placed a second round tender offer on McLeod that amounted to a one-year, $2.35 million contract.

Head coach Jeff Fisher retained McDonald and McLeod as the starting safety duo to begin the 2015 regular season. McLeod started the Rams' season-opener against the Seattle Seahawks and collected six combined tackles in their 34–31 victory. In Week 7, against the Cleveland Browns, he had his first professional touchdown on a 20-yard fumble return. On November 22, 2015, McLeod set a season-high with nine combined tackles (six solo), made one pass deflection, a forced fumble, and had his lone interception of the season on a pass attempt by Joe Flacco during a 16–13 loss at the Baltimore Ravens. In his final season with the St. Louis Rams, McLeod recorded 82 combined tackles (59 solo), five pass deflections, three forced fumbles, and an interception in 16 games and 16 starts. Pro Football Focus gave McLeod an overall grade of 83.9, which was the 10th highest grade among qualifying safeties and the 9th highest pass coverage grade of 79.8 in 2015.

=== Philadelphia Eagles ===
==== 2016 ====
Following the conclusion of the 2015 NFL season, McLeod became an unrestricted free agent and was widely considered as one of the top safeties available in free agency. He reportedly garnered interest from multiple teams including the New York Giants and Baltimore Ravens and received contract offers from v the Philadelphia Eagles, Cleveland Browns, Jacksonville Jaguars, and Tampa Bay Buccaneers.

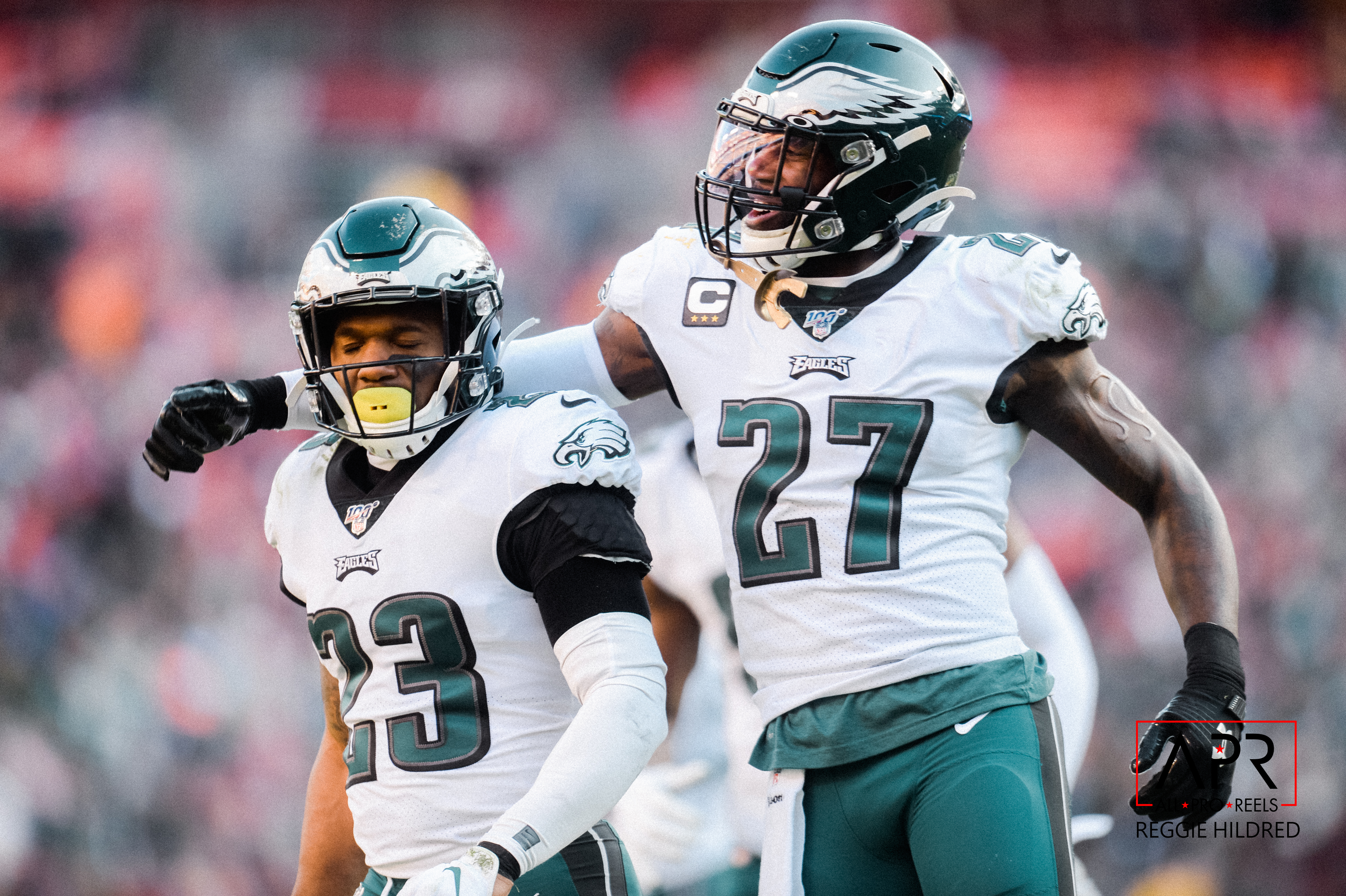
McLeod (left) with safety Malcolm Jenkins

On March 9, 2016, the Eagles signed McLeod to a five-year, $35 million contract that includes $17 million guaranteed and a signing bonus of $8 million. The contract is worth up to $37 million with incentives, makes McLeod the fourth highest paid safety, and pays him a $7.4 million yearly average salary that is the fourth largest salary among all safeties. The Philadelphia Eagles made McLeod and Malcolm Jenkins the highest paid safety duo in the NFL.

Head coach Doug Pederson named McLeod and Jenkins the starting safeties to begin the regular season. He started the Eagles' season-opener against the Browns and recorded four combined tackles and intercepted a pass by quarterback Robert Griffin III in their 29–10 victory. In Week 6, McLeod collected a career-high 14 combined tackles (12 solo) in the Eagles' 27–20 loss at the Washington Redskins. The following week, he recorded seven solo tackles, broke up a pass, made an interception, and his first career sack on Sam Bradford during a 21–10 victory against the Vikings. He finished his first season with the Philadelphia Eagles with a career-high 83 combined tackles (72 solo), seven pass deflections, three interceptions, a forced fumble, and a sack in 16 games and 16 starts.

==== 2017 ====
Defensive coordinator Jim Schwartz retained McLeod and Jenkins as the starting safeties and also had Patrick Robinson, Sidney Jones, and Rasul Douglas added to their secondary.

In Week 2, McLeod recorded two combined tackles before leaving the Eagles' 27–20 loss at the Kansas City Chiefs in the second quarter after sustaining a hamstring injury. He missed the following game against the Giants and had his 66-game streak as a starter come to an end. He also appeared in every single game since his debut as a rookie in 2012, totaling 82 consecutive games. In Week 8, McLeod recorded four combined tackles, deflected a pass, and an interception in a 33–10 victory against the 49ers. On November 19, 2017, he made three combined tackles, broke up a pass, and intercepted a pass by Dak Prescott in the Eagles' 37–9 win at the Dallas Cowboys. McLeod had three consecutive games with an interception for the first time in his career. On December 16, 2017, he collected a season-high 12 combined tackles in a 34–29 win at the New York Giants. McLeod was a healthy scratch in Week 17 and was kept inactive to rest for the playoffs after he sustained a quadriceps injury a few weeks prior. He finished the 2017 season with 54 combined tackles (39 solo), six pass deflections, three interceptions, and a forced fumble in 14 games and 14 starts. Pro Football Focus gave McLeod an overall grade of 79.3, ranking him 39th among all safeties in 2017.

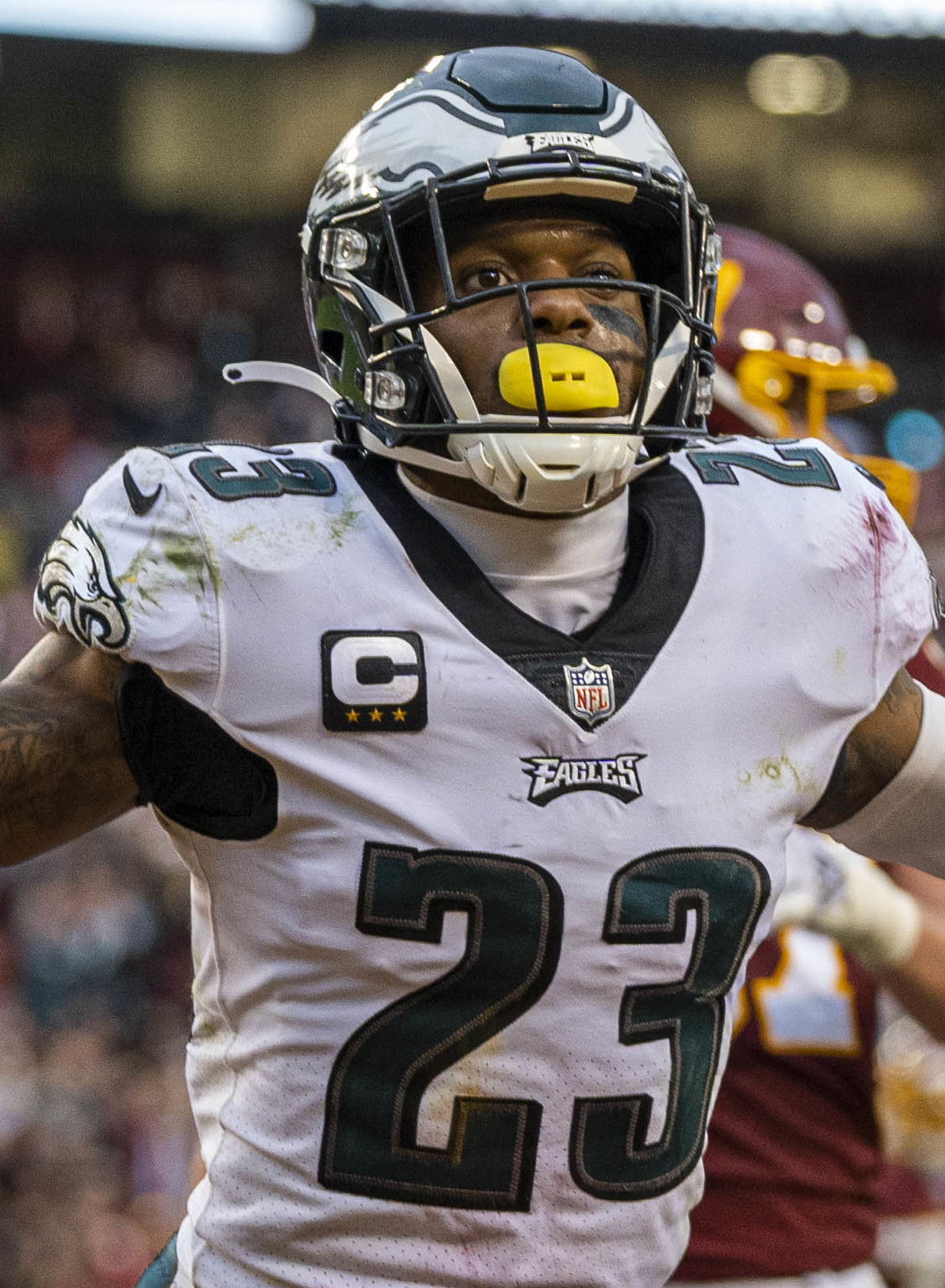
McLeod in 2022

The Eagles finished the 2017 season atop the NFC East with a 13–3 record and clinched a playoff berth and home field advantage. On January 13, 2018, McLeod started his first career playoff game and recorded seven solo tackles and a sack on Matt Ryan during the Eagles' 15–10 victory against the Falcons in the NFC Divisional round. The Eagles went on to defeat the Vikings in the NFC Championship and went on to face the New England Patriots in the Super Bowl. On February 4, 2018, McLeod started in Super Bowl LII and recorded six combined tackles and broke up a pass in the Eagles' 41–33 victory. McLeod graded out as the 36th best safety by Pro Football Focus in 2017.

==== 2018 ====
On September 29, 2018, McLeod was placed on injured reserve after undergoing surgery to repair a torn MCL he suffered in Week 3 against the Indianapolis Colts.

==== 2019 ====
In the 2019 season, McLeod started all 16 games and had 74 tackles, six pass defenses and two interceptions.

==== 2020 ====
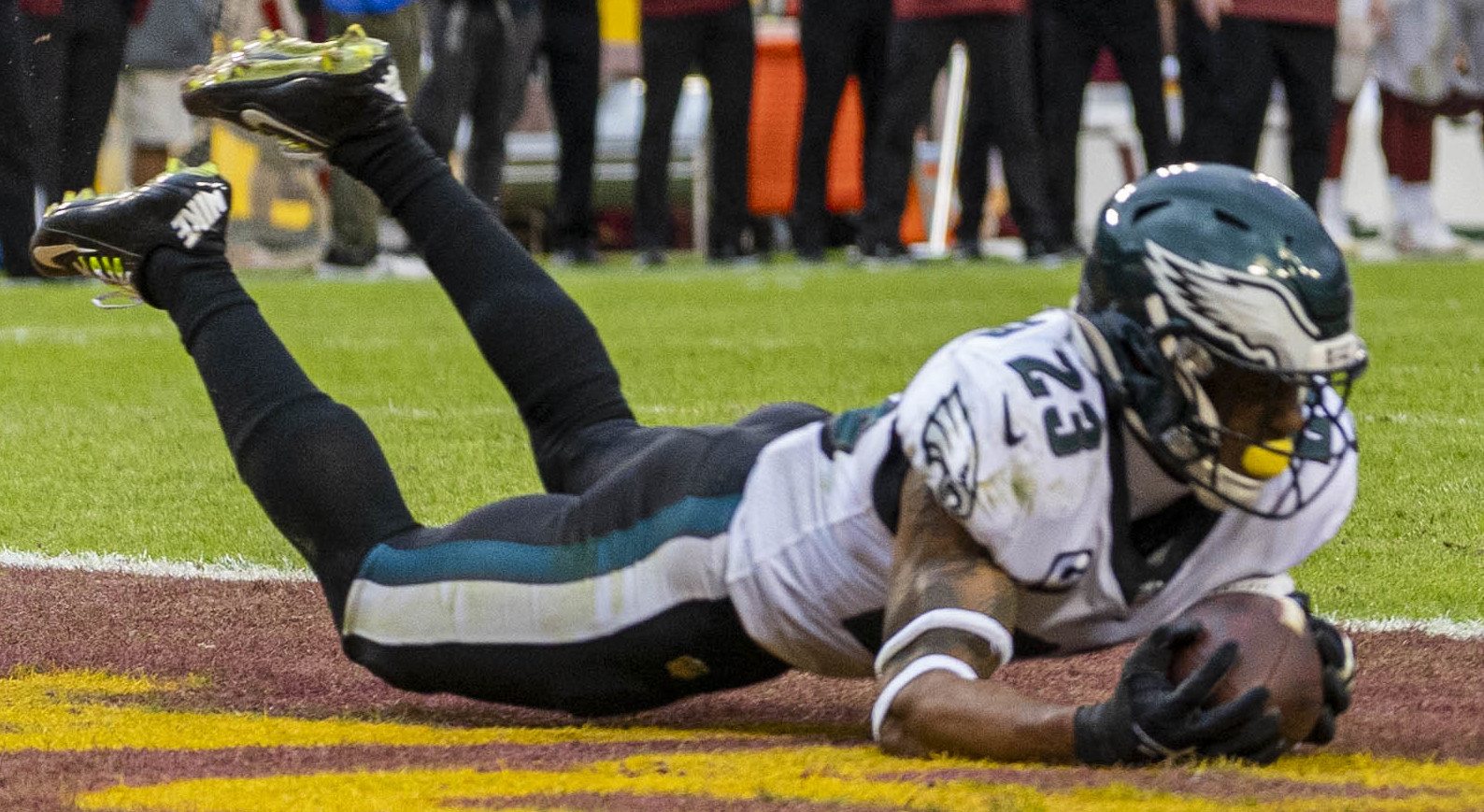
McLeod makes a game-winning interception for the Eagles in 2021

On March 25, 2020, McLeod signed a two-year contract with the Eagles. In Week 8 against the Cowboys, he scored his second professional touchdown on a 53-yard fumble recovery in the 23–9 victory. On December 10, McLeod was selected as the Eagles' nominee for the Walter Payton Man of the Year Award for 2020. On December 13, 2020, he suffered a torn ACL against the New Orleans Saints, and was subsequently placed on injured reserve, which would end his season. On December 16, 2020, McLeod was placed on injured reserve.

==== 2021 ====
In Week 17 against the Washington Football Team, McLeod made a diving interception in the end zone that sealed the win for the Eagles and, later that day, helped to clinch the Eagles a spot in the playoffs. He was placed on the COVID list on January 3, 2022. He was activated one week later on January 10, missing just one game where the Eagles did not play their starters.

=== Indianapolis Colts ===
McLeod signed with the Colts on April 14, 2022. He played in all 17 games with 16 starts, recording a career-high 96 tackles, eight passes defended, two interceptions, and a fumble recovery. One of his two interceptions was a 27-yard return for a touchdown in the Week 18 loss to the Houston Texans.

=== Cleveland Browns ===
On May 5, 2023, McLeod signed with the Browns. He played in 10 games with five starts before suffering a season-ending torn biceps in Week 11 requiring surgery. He was placed on injured reserve on November 21, 2023.

McLeod re-signed with the Browns on March 25, 2024. He played in all 17 games with five starts, recording 39 tackles, five passes defensed, and two touchdowns; a fumble recovery return and a blocked field goal return.

After the 2024 season, McLeod announced his retirement from the NFL after 13 seasons.

== NFL career statistics ==
Year	Team	Games		Tackles					Interceptions					Fumbles			
Year	Team	GP	GS	Cmb	Solo	Ast	TFL	Sck	PD	Int	Yds	Lng	TD	FF	FR	Yds	TD
2012	STL	16	0	12	9	3	0	0.0	0	0	0	0	0	0	0	0	0
2013	STL	16	16	79	63	16	2	0.0	7	2	2	2	0	2	2	9	0
2014	STL	16	16	72	62	10	3	0.0	6	2	1	1	0	2	2	9	0
2015	STL	16	16	82	59	23	2	0.0	5	1	4	4	0	3	1	20	1
2016	PHI	16	16	83	72	11	3	1.0	7	3	5	5	0	1	0	0	0
2017	PHI	14	14	54	39	15	2	0.0	6	3	67	50	0	1	1	9	0
2018	PHI	3	3	10	7	3	0	0.0	4	0	0	0	0	0	0	0	0
2019	PHI	16	16	76	46	30	0	1.0	6	2	30	23	0	2	0	0	0
2020	PHI	13	13	66	43	23	3	0.0	7	1	21	21	0	0	2	50	1
2021	PHI	13	13	58	32	26	0	0.0	4	2	24	24	0	0	0	0	0
2022	IND	17	16	96	59	37	8	0.0	8	2	27	27	1	0	1	0	0
2023	CLE	10	5	29	16	13	2	0.0	1	0	0	0	0	0	0	0	0
2024	CLE	17	5	39	28	11	2	0.0	5	0	0	0	0	0	1	25	1
Career		183	148	757	536	221	27	2.0	66	18	181	50	1	12	10	122	3

== Personal life ==
In the summer of 2019, McLeod married fellow University of Virginia graduate Erika. The pair launched the Change Our Future charity in the midst of the COVID-19 pandemic and hosted their first annual Sneaker Ball on December 6, 2021.
