= Darian Stewart =

American football player (born 1988)

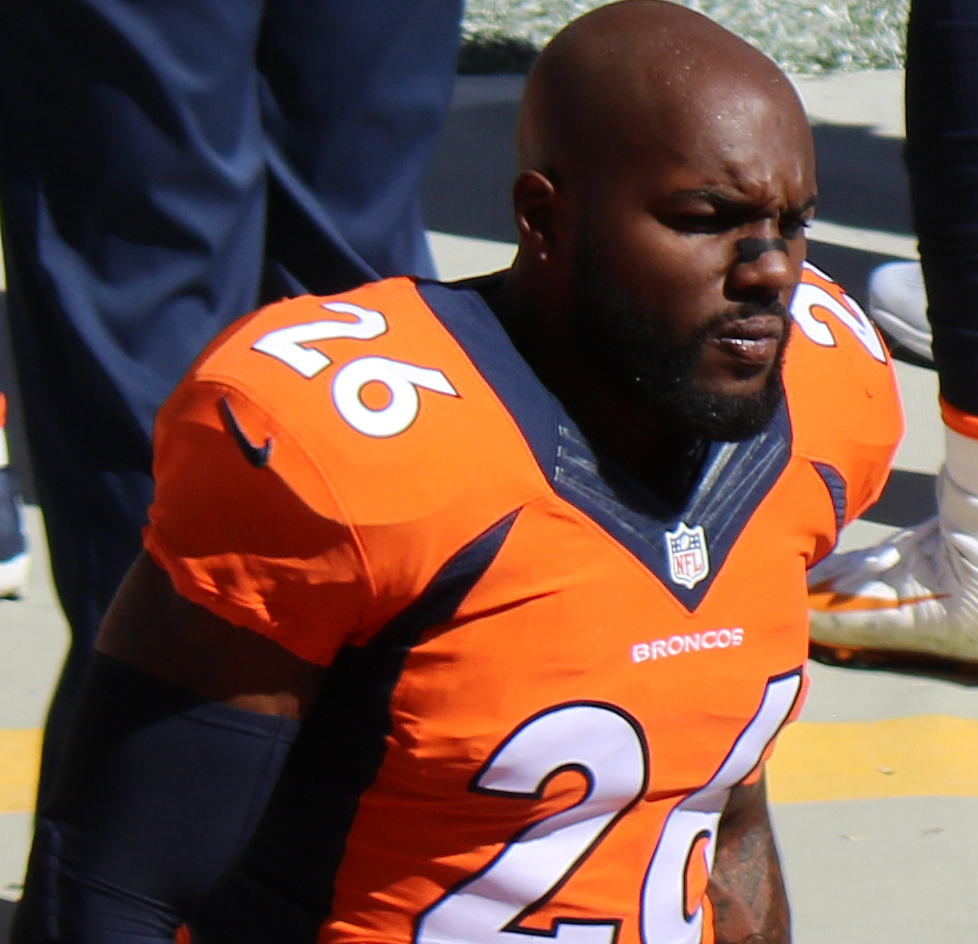
- Stewart with the Denver Broncos in 2016

No. 20, 24, 26
- Position: Safety

Personal information
- Born: August 4, 1988 (age 38); Huntsville, Alabama, U.S.
- Listed height: 5 ft 11 in (1.80 m)
- Listed weight: 214 lb (97 kg)

Career information
- High school: Lee (Huntsville, Alabama)
- College: South Carolina (2006–2009)
- NFL draft: 2010: undrafted

Career history
- St. Louis Rams (2010–2013); Baltimore Ravens (2014); Denver Broncos (2015–2018); Tampa Bay Buccaneers (2019)

Awards and highlights
- Super Bowl champion (50); Pro Bowl (2016)

Career NFL statistics
- Total tackles: 463
- Sacks: 5
- Pass deflections: 46
- Interceptions: 11
- Forced fumbles: 6
- Defensive touchdowns: 1
- Stats at Pro Football Reference

Darian Stewart (born August 4, 1988) is an American former professional football safety who played in the National Football League (NFL). He played college football for the South Carolina Gamecocks. He was signed by the St. Louis Rams as an undrafted free agent after the 2010 NFL draft. He also played for the Baltimore Ravens, Denver Broncos, and Tampa Bay Buccaneers. As a member of the Broncos, he won a Super Bowl ring in Super Bowl 50 over the Carolina Panthers. He was named to his first Pro Bowl in 2017.

== Early life ==
Stewart played high school football at Lee High School in Huntsville, Alabama. Stewart was a three-star prospect according to Rivals.com and was rated as the No. 35 safety in America and was on the Rivals.com Alabama Top 25 2006 list. Stewart was selected as the Huntsville Times Super All-Metro Most Valuable Player as a senior and was named finalist for the 5A Back of the Year Award. He was all-city and all-metro honoree in 2004 and 2005. He also competed in track & field as a triple jumper.

== College career ==
Stewart enrolled at South Carolina in 2006 and immediately saw action in 12 out of 13 games, both on defense and on special teams. He was a 2009 East-West Shrine Invite. In 2008, he played in 13 games with 13 starts and made 64 tackles (46 solo) and none for losses. In addition, he had 2 sacks, 8 pass breakups and forced two fumbles while recovering two. He earned the Joe Morrison Award as the Defensive Player of the Spring. In 2007, he played in 12 games with 10 starts. He made 68 tackles (56 solo) and three were for losses. He intercepted 2 passes, broke up 7 passes, recovered 2 fumbles and forced 2 fumbles. In 2006 his numbers were as follows: 2006: 12 GP; 0 GS; 5 Sol-7 TT; Saw action in 12 of 13 games as a true freshman, both on defense and on special teams.

== Professional career ==
External videos
- Darian Stewart's NFL Combine workout

Pre-draft measurables
Height	Weight	Arm length	Hand span	40-yard dash	10-yard split	20-yard split	20-yard shuttle	Three-cone drill	Vertical jump	Broad jump	Bench press
5 ft 11 in (1.80 m)	213 lb (97 kg)	32 1/2 in (0.83 m)	8 7/8 in (0.23 m)	4.55 s	1.60 s	2.68 s	4.19 s	6.89 s	37.0 in (0.94 m)	10 ft 2 in (3.10 m)	12 reps
All values from NFL Combine/Pro Day

=== St. Louis Rams ===
==== 2010 ====
On April 26, 2010, the St. Louis Rams signed Stewart to a two-year, $737,500 contract after he went undrafted in the 2010 NFL draft.

Throughout training camp, he competed for a roster spot and a job as a backup safety against David Roach, Craig Dahl, James Butler, and Kevin Payne. Head coach Steve Spagnuolo named Stewart the backup free safety behind Oshiomogho Atogwe and the backup strong safety behind Craig Dahl and James Butler.

He made his professional regular season debut in the St. Louis Rams' season-opening 17–13 loss to the Arizona Cardinals. In Week 3, Stewart recorded his first career tackle of fullback Mike Sellers after he caught an 11-yard pass from Donovan McNabb and finished the Rams' 30–16 victory against the Washington Redskins with two solo tackles. On December 12, 2010, Stewart collected two solo tackles and recorded his first career sack on quarterback Drew Brees during the Rams' 31–13 loss at the New Orleans Saints. In Week 16, he recorded a season-high five solo tackles in their 25–17 win against the San Francisco 49ers. He finished his rookie season in 2010 with 17 combined tackles (16 solo), two pass deflections, and a sack in 13 games and zero starts.

==== 2011 ====
Stewart entered training camp competing in a competition to name a starting free safety after it was left vacant by the departure of Oshiomogho Atogwe. He competed against Craig Dahl, James Butler, and rookie Jermale Hines. Defensive coordinator Ken Flajole named Craig Dahl as the starting free safety, alongside Quintin Mikell, with Stewart as his backup to begin the regular season.

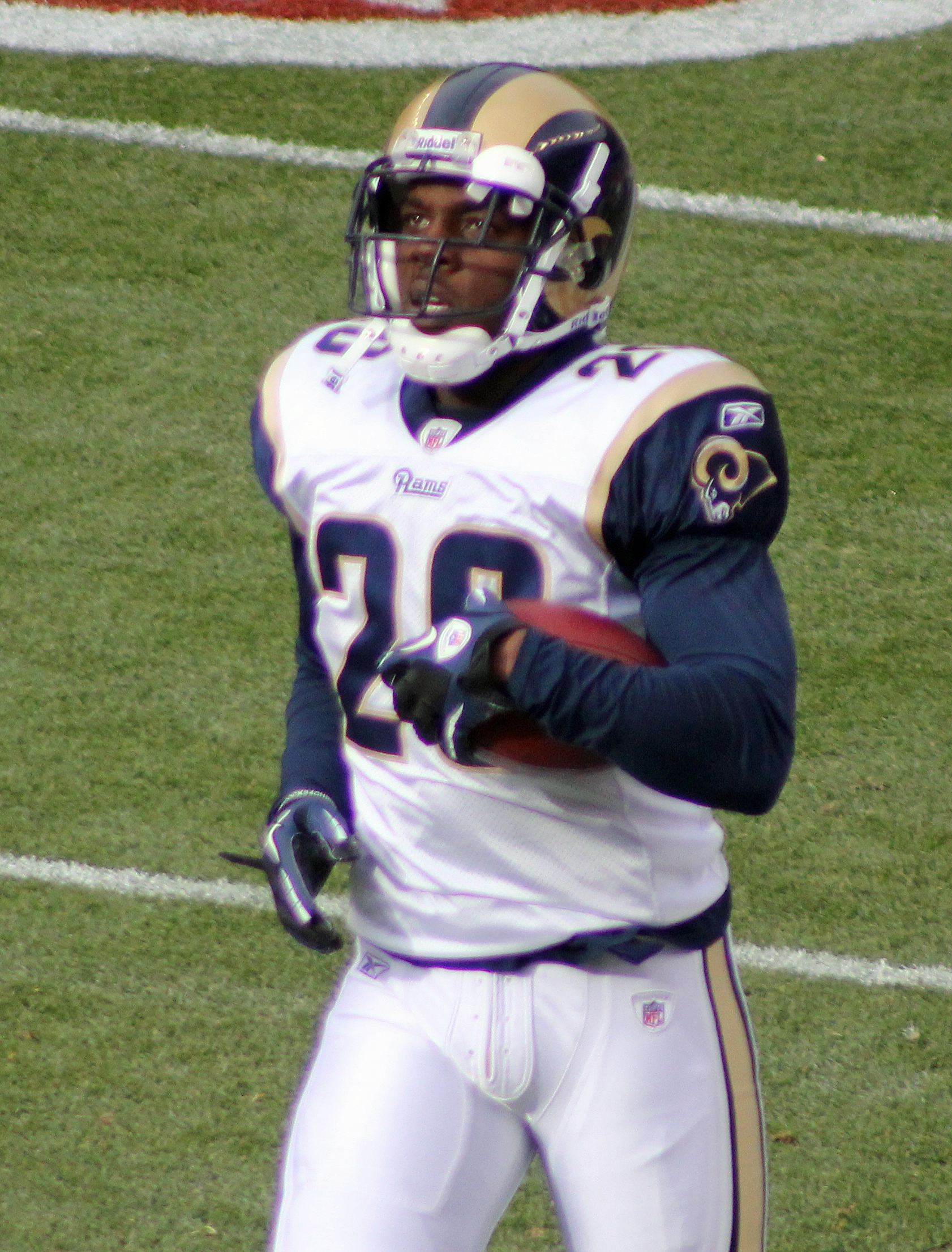
Stewart playing for the Rams in 2010.

On September 25, 2011, Stewart earned his first career start after surpassing Craig Dahl on the depth chart. He finished the Rams' 37–7 loss to the Baltimore Ravens with four solo tackles. In Week 8, Stewart recorded seven combined tackles, two pass deflections, and returned an interception by Drew Brees for a 27-yard touchdown during a 31–21 win against the New Orleans Saints. His touchdown in the fourth quarter helped the Rams gain a 31–14 lead and marked his first career interception and touchdown. On November 20, 2011, Stewart collected a season-high eight solo tackles as the Rams lost 24–7 to the Seattle Seahawks. On November 27, 2011, he made seven combined tackles and a sack before leaving the Rams' 23–20 loss to the Arizona Cardinals in the fourth quarter after sustaining a concussion. He remained in concussion protocol and missed the Rams' Week 13 matchup at the San Francisco 49ers. He finished the 2011 season with a career-high 84 combined tackles (67 solo), 11 pass deflections, a career-high three sacks, two forced fumbles, an interception, and a touchdown in 15 games and 13 starts.

==== 2012 ====
On January 2, 2012, the St. Louis Rams fired head coach Steve Spagnuolo after a 2–14 season. Stewart was slated to retain his starting role and competed against Craig Dahl, Matt Daniels, and Rodney McLeod throughout training camp. Stewart suffered a hamstring injury during training camp and missed the majority of the preseason and the first two games of the regular season. Head coach Jeff Fisher opted to keep Craig Dahl at free safety and named Stewart the backup once he returned in Week 3. In Week 14, Stewart recorded a season-high four solo tackles in the Rams' 15–12 victory at the Buffalo Bills. With Dahl and Mikell entrenched in the starting safety roles, Stewart finished his 2012 season with ten solo tackles in 12 games and zero starts.

==== 2013 ====
On March 21, 2013, the St. Louis Rams signed Stewart to a one-year, $1.3 million restricted free agent tender with a right of first refusal clause in his contract.

He entered training camp slated as the starting strong safety after Craig Dahl and Quintin Mikell departed in free agency. Stewart missed a period of training camp after he sustained a soft tissue injury. He garnered competition for his starting role during his absence from Rodney McLeod, Matt Daniels, and rookie T. J. McDonald. He was sidelined for the entire preseason and was inactive for the first three regular season games (Weeks 1–3).

In Week 5, he started at free safety and recorded a season-high six combined tackles in the Rams' 34–20 win over the Jacksonville Jaguars. On December 15, 2013, Stewart recorded a season-high six solo tackles during a 27–16 victory against the New Orleans Saints. Stewart finished the 2013 season with 36 combined tackles (30 solo), five pass deflections, and a forced fumble in 13 games and six starts.

Stewart became an unrestricted free agent after the 2013 season and was not offered a contract to return to the St. Louis Rams. He attended meetings with the Carolina Panthers and Baltimore Ravens.

=== Baltimore Ravens ===
On March 21, 2014, the Baltimore Ravens signed Stewart to a one-year, $1.3 million contract. The move reunited him with Ravens' assistant head coach/secondary coach Steve Spagnuolo. Spagnuolo was Stewart's head coach during his first two seasons with the St. Louis Rams.

Stewart was the favorite to earn the starting job at free safety entering camp and competed against Jeromy Miles and Terrence Brooks. Head coach John Harbaugh named Stewart the starting free safety, along with strong safety Matt Elam, to begin the regular season.

He started the Baltimore Ravens' season-opener against the Cincinnati Bengals and collected a season-high nine combined tackles during their 23–16 loss. On December 21, 2014, Stewart made four combined tackles, a pass deflection, and intercepted a pass by quarterback Case Keenum in the Ravens' 25–13 loss at the Houston Texans. He finished his only season as part of the Baltimore Ravens with 53 combined tackles (36 solo), six pass deflections, an interception, a forced fumble, and a fumble recovery in 16 games and 14 starts. He played in all 16 regular season games for the first time in his first five seasons.

The Baltimore Ravens finished third in the AFC North with a 10–6 record and qualified for a wildcard spot. On January 3, 2015, Stewart started his first career playoff game and recorded one solo tackle, two pass deflections, and intercepted a pass by Ben Roethlisberger in the fourth quarter of the Ravens' 30–17 win against the Pittsburgh Steelers in the AFC Wild Card Round. The following week, he made two solo tackles as the Ravens lost 35–31 to the eventual Super Bowl XLIX Champions the New England Patriots.

Stewart became an unrestricted free agent after the 2014 season and did not receive an offer to return to the Baltimore Ravens. On March 12, 2015, Stewart attended a visit with the Denver Broncos and received a contract offer after he met with team representatives. The following day, he met with personnel from the Atlanta Falcons.

=== Denver Broncos ===
==== 2015 ====
On March 13, 2015, the Denver Broncos signed Stewart to a two-year, $4.25 million contract that includes $2.25 million guaranteed and a signing bonus of $1.5 million. Head coach Gary Kubiak was also with the Baltimore Ravens the previous season as their offensive coordinator.

Throughout training camp, Stewart competed against David Bruton for the job as the starting free safety after it was left vacant by the departure of Rahim Moore. Defensive coordinator Wade Phillips named Stewart the starting free safety with T. J. Ward at strong safety.

He started the Denver Broncos' season-opener against his former team, the Baltimore Ravens, and recorded four combined tackles, a pass deflection, and intercepted a pass by Joe Flacco to seal their 19–13 victory. On September 27, 2015, Stewart recorded a season-high eight combined tackles during a 24–12 victory at the Detroit Lions. He finished his first season with the Broncos with 63 combined tackles (48 solo), ten pass deflections, one interception, two fumble recoveries, and a forced fumble in 15 games and 13 starts. Pro Football Focus gave Stewart a 77.1 coverage grade, 80.4 grade for run defense, and an overall grade of 81.8 in 2015. His overall grade ranked 16th among all qualifying safeties.

Stewart was an integral part of the Denver Broncos' successful 2015 season and helped them finish first in the AFC West with a 12–4 record. The Broncos defeated the Pittsburgh Steelers in the AFC Divisional round and New England Patriots in the AFC Championship. On February 7, 2016, Stewart recorded three combined tackles, two pass deflections, a forced fumble, and sacked quarterback Cam Newton in the Broncos' 24–10 victory against the Carolina Panthers in Super Bowl 50.

==== 2016 ====
The Broncos retained all five members of the "No Fly Zone" as their key starters entering training camp and to start the regular season.

On October 30, 2016, Stewart recorded three combined tackles, broke up a pass, and intercepted a pass by Philip Rivers during a 27–19 victory against the San Diego Chargers. The following week, he collected a season-high eight solo tackles in the Broncos' 30–20 loss at the Oakland Raiders. On November 26, the Denver Broncos signed Stewart to a four-year, $28 million contract extension that includes $13 million guaranteed and a $7 million signing bonus. The agreement kept him under contract through the 2019 season and was worth up to $30 million with incentives.

He finished the season with 68 combined tackles (55 solo), six pass deflections, three interceptions, and a forced fumble in 16 games and 16 starts. The Denver Broncos finished third in the AFC West with a 9–7 record and did not qualify for the playoffs. On January 17, 2017, it was announced that Stewart would play in the 2017 Pro Bowl as a replacement for Eric Berry.

==== 2017 ====
Stewart was retained as the starting free safety to begin the regular season, alongside strong safety Justin Simmons. In Week 3, he collected a season-high seven combined tackles in a 26–16 loss at the Buffalo Bills. On October 30, 2017, Stewart made two solo tackles, a season-high two pass deflections, and intercepted a pass by Alex Smith during a 29–19 loss at the Kansas City Chiefs. Stewart finished the 2017 season with 63 combined tackles (52 solo), five pass deflections, and three interceptions in 16 starts and 15 games. Pro Football Focus gave Stewart an overall grade of 70.3, ranking him 63rd among all qualifying safeties in 2017.

==== 2018 ====
Stewart entered the 2018 season as the Broncos starting strong safety. He started 14 games, recording 60 combined tackles, one sack, three passes defensed, and two interceptions.

On March 6, 2019, Stewart was released by the Broncos.

=== Tampa Bay Buccaneers ===
On August 13, 2019, Stewart signed with the Tampa Bay Buccaneers. In the 2019 season, he appeared in 13 games.

On December 10, 2020, Stewart announced his retirement from the NFL, citing a desire to spend more time with family. He also expressed interest in joining Shane Beamer's staff at South Carolina.

== NFL career statistics ==
Year	Team	Games		Tackles				Fumbles			Interceptions					
Year	Team	GP	GS	Cmb	Solo	Ast	Sck	FF	FR	Yds	Int	Yds	Avg	Lng	TD	PD
2010	STL	13	0	17	16	1	1.0	0	1	0	0	0	0.0	0	0	2
2011	STL	15	13	84	67	17	3.0	2	0	0	1	27	27.0	27	1	11
2012	STL	12	0	10	10	0	0.0	0	0	0	0	0	0.0	0	0	0
2013	STL	13	6	36	30	6	0.0	1	1	19	0	0	0.0	0	0	5
2014	BAL	16	14	53	37	16	0.0	1	1	0	1	0	0.0	0	0	3
2015	DEN	15	13	63	48	15	0.0	1	2	0	1	0	0.0	0	0	10
2016	DEN	16	16	68	55	13	0.0	1	1	28	3	36	12.0	25	0	6
2017	DEN	16	15	63	52	11	0.0	0	0	0	3	33	11.0	24	0	5
2018	DEN	14	14	60	46	14	1.0	0	1	0	2	3	1.5	3	0	3
2019	TB	13	1	9	6	3	0.0	0	0	0	0	0	0.0	0	0	1
Career		143	92	463	367	96	5.0	6	7	47	11	99	9.0	27	1	46

== See also ==
- No Fly Zone
