= Trumaine Johnson (cornerback) =

American football player (born 1990)

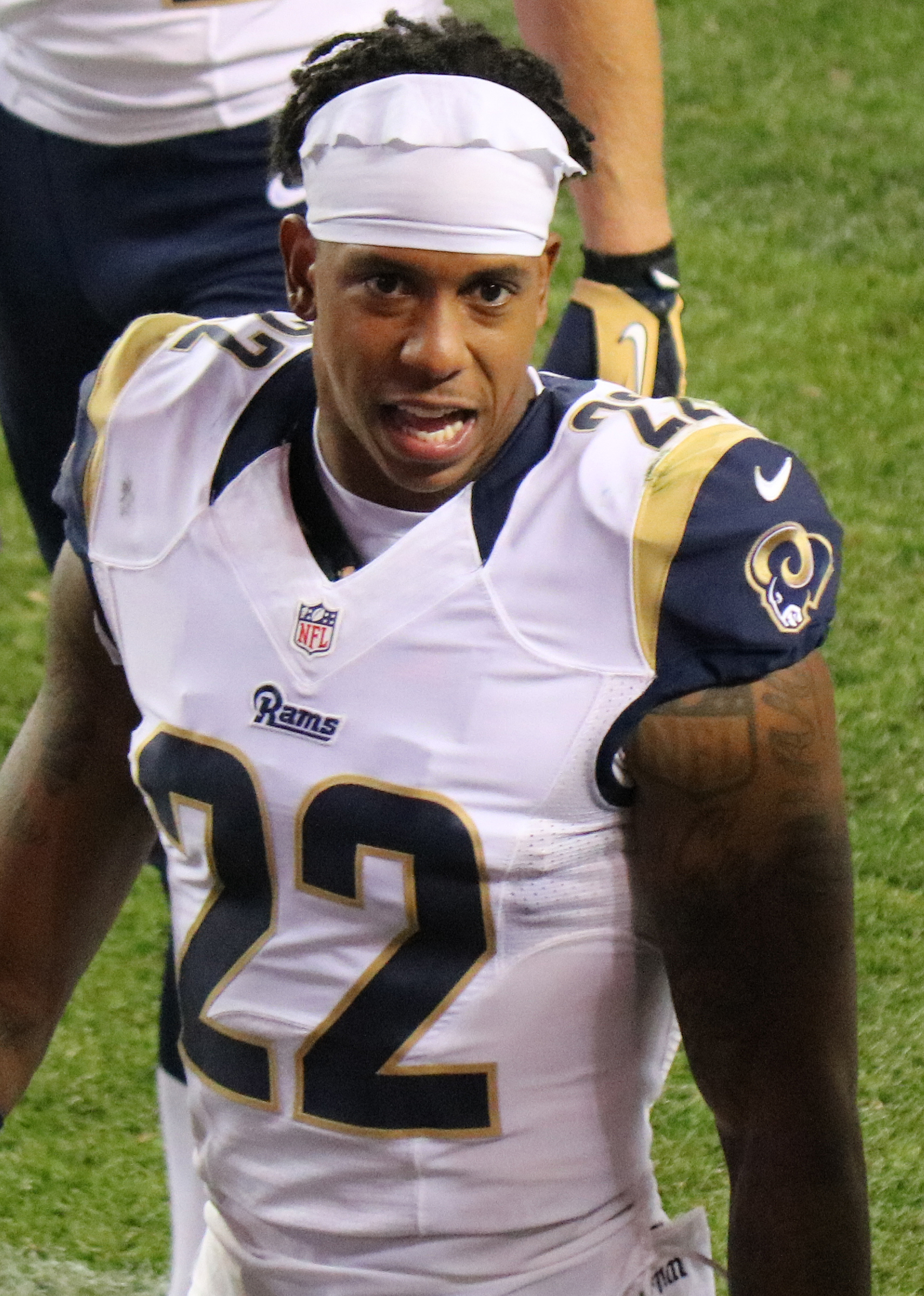
- Johnson with the St. Louis Rams in 2016

No. 22
- Position: Cornerback

Personal information
- Born: January 1, 1990 (age 36); Stockton, California, U.S.
- Listed height: 6 ft 2 in (1.88 m)
- Listed weight: 213 lb (97 kg)

Career information
- High school: Edison (Stockton)
- College: Montana (2008–2011)
- NFL draft: 2012: 3rd round, 65th overall pick

Career history
- St. Louis / Los Angeles Rams (2012–2017); New York Jets (2018–2019); Carolina Panthers (2020)*
- * Offseason or practice squad member only

Awards and highlights
- 2× FCS All-American (2010, 2011); First-team All-Big Sky (2010)

Career NFL statistics
- Total tackles: 393
- Pass deflections: 74
- Interceptions: 23
- Forced fumbles: 3
- Fumble recoveries: 4
- Defensive touchdowns: 4
- Stats at Pro Football Reference

Trumaine Monte Johnson (born January 1, 1990) is an American former professional football player who was a cornerback in the National Football League (NFL). He played college football for the Montana Grizzlies, and was selected by the St. Louis Rams in the third round of the 2012 NFL draft.

== Early life ==
A native of Stockton, California, Johnson attended Edison High School, where he played football and was an unranked wide receiver prospect.

== College career ==
In 2008, Johnson played college football for Montana, where he was a rare starter at cornerback as a true freshman. He started 13 of 14 games, recording 54-12-2 with a forced fumble, six tackles for loss, and a sack. The previous season he was ninth on the team in tackles with 44 stops. He was a Big Sky honorable mention selection. In 2009, he had team-highs of five interceptions and 12 pass deflections in 11 games (he missed four contests due to injury). He would be ranked first (tie) in the league in pass deflections (1.09 pg) and second in interceptions (0.45 pg). He was fourth on the team with 31 solo tackles, and was the team's fourth leading returning tackler with 54 stops. He was a First-team All-Big Sky pick in 2010 . He tied for the team lead with four interceptions and tied for sixth in the Big Sky with .36 picks a game. In 2011, Johnson started in the first 11 games, but suffered an injury against Idaho State and missed UM's last five games. He was second at UM with four interceptions, and returned two of those picks for touchdowns.

== Professional career ==
=== Pre-draft ===
Coming out of Montana, Johnson was projected as a second round pick by the majority of NFL draft experts and analysts. He received an invitation to the NFL combine and completed all of the required combine and positional drills. On March 9, 2012, Johnson attended Montana's pro day and opted to only perform positional drills for scouts and team representatives in attendance. He was ranked as the fifth best cornerback prospect in the draft by NFL analyst Mike Mayock and was ranked the eighth best cornerback by NFLDraftScout.com.

Pre-draft measurables
Height	Weight	Arm length	Hand span	40-yard dash	10-yard split	20-yard split	20-yard shuttle	Three-cone drill	Vertical jump	Broad jump	Bench press
6 ft 1 7/8 in (1.88 m)	204 lb (93 kg)	33 1/4 in (0.84 m)	9 3/8 in (0.24 m)	4.61 s	1.66 s	2.71 s	4.15 s	7.20 s	35.5 in (0.90 m)	10 ft 2 in (3.10 m)	19 reps
All values from NFL Combine

=== St. Louis / Los Angeles Rams ===
==== 2012 ====
The St. Louis Rams selected Johnson in the third round (65th overall) of the 2012 NFL draft. He was the second cornerback selected by the Rams, after North Alabama's Janoris Jenkins (39th overall).

On July 24, 2012, the St. Louis Rams signed Johnson to a four-year, $3.04 million contract. He competed with Bradley Fletcher, Jerome Murphy, Josh Gordy, Quinton Pointer, and Kendric Burney throughout training camp for the St. Louis Rams' third cornerback position. Johnson was named the Rams' third cornerback on their depth chart to begin the season, behind fellow rookie Janoris Jenkins and veteran Cortland Finnegan.

Johnson made his professional regular season debut during the Rams' 23–27 loss to the Detroit Lions. On September 30, Johnson recorded a tackle, one pass deflection, and his first career interception, picking off Seattle Seahawks quarterback Russell Wilson during a 19-13 victory. On November 11, Johnson made his first career start and collected four solo tackles as the Rams had a 24-24 overtime draw with the San Francisco 49ers. In Week 16, He recorded three pass-breakups and his second interception of his career against the Tampa Bay Buccaneers, picking off Josh Freeman. He finished his rookie season with a total of 31 combined tackles (29 solo), eight pass break ups, and two interceptions in three starts and 16 games.

==== 2013 ====
Johnson returned in 2013 as the St. Louis Rams' third cornerback behind Jenkins and Finnegan. In the Rams' 27–24 season-opening victory over the Arizona Cardinals, Johnson made three combined tackles, broke up two passes, and intercepted quarterback Carson Palmer, returning it 29 yards to the four-yard line. On October 20, 2013, Johnson recorded a season-high nine combined tackles as the Rams lost 15–30 to the Carolina Panthers. In Week 10, he made four combined tackles, intercepted Andrew Luck, and defended three passes in a 38–8 win over the Indianapolis Colts. On December 15, Johnson picked off quarterback Drew Brees and recorded six tackles in a win over the New Orleans Saints, marking his fifth interception of his career. He finished with 68 tackles (58 solo), 11 pass deflections, three interceptions, and a forced fumble.

==== 2014 ====
Johnson entered training camp slated as the starting cornerback, alongside Janoris Jenkins. On August 23, 2014, Johnson made a solo tackle before exiting the Rams' 33–14 victory at the Cleveland Browns and was carted off the field in the second quarter of their third preseason game. He sustained a knee injury and was inactive for the Rams' first seven games of the season (Weeks 1–8). On November 16, 2014, Johnson recorded two solo tackles, two pass deflections, and intercepted a pass by Peyton Manning in the fourth quarter to seal a 22–7 victory against the Denver Broncos in Week 11. In Week 13, Johnson recorded six solo tackles, broke up two passes, made two interceptions, and a touchdown as the Rams routed the Oakland Raiders 52–0. He intercepted a pass by both Derek Carr and Matt Schaub and returned the second interception for a 43-yard touchdown. It marked his first career game with multiple interceptions. The following week, he collected a season-high eight combined tackles and a pass deflection during a 24–0 win at the Washington Redskins. Johnson finished the 2014 season with 36 combined tackles (33 solo), six pass deflections, three interceptions, and a touchdown in nine games.

==== 2015 ====
Head coach Jeff Fisher retained Johnson and Jenkins as the starting cornerback duo to begin the 2015 regular season. He started in the St. Louis Rams' season-opener against the Seattle Seahawks and recorded three solo tackles, broke up a pass, and intercepted Russell Wilson during a 34–31 victory. He left the game in the third quarter after sustaining a thigh injury and was sidelined for the next two weeks (Weeks 12–13). On December 27, 2015, Johnson recorded four solo tackles, two pass deflections, and intercepted a pass by Russell Wilson during a 23–17 victory at the Seattle Seahawks in Week 16. With the interception, he marked his third consecutive game with a pick and brought his season interception total to seven. The following week, he collected a season-high ten solo tackles and broke up a pass in the Rams' 19–16 loss at the San Francisco 49ers. Johnson finished the 2015 season with a career-high 71 combined tackles (58 solo), a career-high 17 pass deflections, and seven interceptions in 14 games and 13 starts. Pro Football Focus gave Johnson an overall grade of 80.9, ranking him among the top 25 cornerbacks.

==== 2016 ====
On March 9, 2016, the St. Louis Rams placed the non-exclusive franchise tag on Johnson. The tag was for one-year and is worth $13.95 million.

In Week 4, Johnson recorded five solo tackles, a career-high six pass breakups, and intercepted a pass by Carson Palmer during a 17–13 win against the Arizona Cardinals. On September 25, 2016, Johnson collected a season-high nine combined tackles and two pass deflections during a 37–32 victory at the Tampa Bay Buccaneers in Week 3. On October 9, 2016, he made two solo tackles and broke up a pass before being carted off the field in the second quarter of the Rams' 30–19 loss against the Buffalo Bills with an ankle injury. His ankle injury sidelined him for the next two games (Weeks 6–7). Johnson finished the 2016 season with 57 combined tackles (47 solo), 11 pass deflections, and an interception in 14 games and 14 starts. He received an overall grade of 81.0 and ranked among the top 25 cornerbacks, in overall grade, for the second consecutive season.

==== 2017 ====
On March 1, 2017, the Los Angeles Rams placed a franchise tag on Johnson for the second consecutive year. On March 6, 2017, Johnson officially signed the one-year, $16.74 million franchise tag offered by the Rams.

Johnson started the Rams' season opener against the Indianapolis Colts and recorded two solo tackles, a pass deflection, a forced fumble, a fumble recovery, interception, and a touchdown in their 46–9 victory. During the third quarter, Joyner returned an interception by quarterback Jacoby Brissett for a 29-yard touchdown and also forced and recovered a fumble by T. Y. Hilton. His performance against the Colts earned him NFC Defensive Player of the Week. On November 5, 2017, he made six combined tackles, a pass deflection, and an interception during a 51–17 victory at the New York Giants. His interception came in the third quarter off a pass by Eli Manning and was his last interception as a part of the Los Angeles Rams. In Week 13, Johnson recorded a season-high seven solo tackles and broke up a pass in the Rams' 32–16 victory at the Arizona Cardinals. He finished the 2017 season with 65 combined tackles (57 solo), 14 pass deflections, and two interceptions in 16 games and 15 starts. Pro Football Focus gave Johnson an overall grade of 74.2, ranking 68th among all qualifying cornerbacks in 2017.

=== New York Jets ===
On March 16, 2018, Johnson signed a five-year, $72.5 million contract with the New York Jets with $34 million guaranteed. He started 10 games for the Jets in 2018, recording 40 tackles, five passes defensed and four interceptions.

On November 5, 2019, Johnson was placed on injured reserve with an ankle injury. He finished the season playing in seven games with five starts, recording 25 tackles, two passes defensed, and one interception.

On March 18, 2020, Johnson was released by the Jets with a post-June 1 designation.

=== Carolina Panthers ===
On September 19, 2020, Johnson was signed to the Carolina Panthers practice squad, but was released six days later.

== NFL career statistics ==
Year	Team	GP	Tackles				Fumbles		Interceptions					
Year	Team	GP	Cmb	Solo	Ast	Sck	FF	FR	Int	Yds	Avg	Lng	TD	PD
2012	STL	16	31	29	2	0.0	0	0	2	4	2.0	4	0	8
2013	STL	16	68	58	10	0.0	1	0	3	36	12.0	29	0	11
2014	STL	9	36	33	3	0.0	0	0	3	69	23.0	43	1	6
2015	STL	14	71	58	13	0.0	0	1	7	136	19.4	58	1	17
2016	LA	14	57	47	10	0.0	0	1	1	0	0.0	0	0	11
2017	LA	16	65	57	8	0.0	1	1	2	39	19.5	39	1	14
2018	NYJ	10	40	35	5	0.0	1	1	4	38	9.5	31	1	5
2019	NYJ	7	25	22	3	0.0	0	0	1	3	3.0	3	0	2
Career		102	393	339	54	0.0	3	4	23	325	14.1	58	4	74

== Personal life ==
In December 2011, Johnson pleaded no contest to disorderly conduct charges relating to an incident in October of that year. On March 22, 2013, Johnson was arrested for drunk driving in Missoula. In May 2013, he pleaded guilty to reckless driving and received a one-year suspended sentence.
