= Cortland Finnegan =

American football player (born 1984)

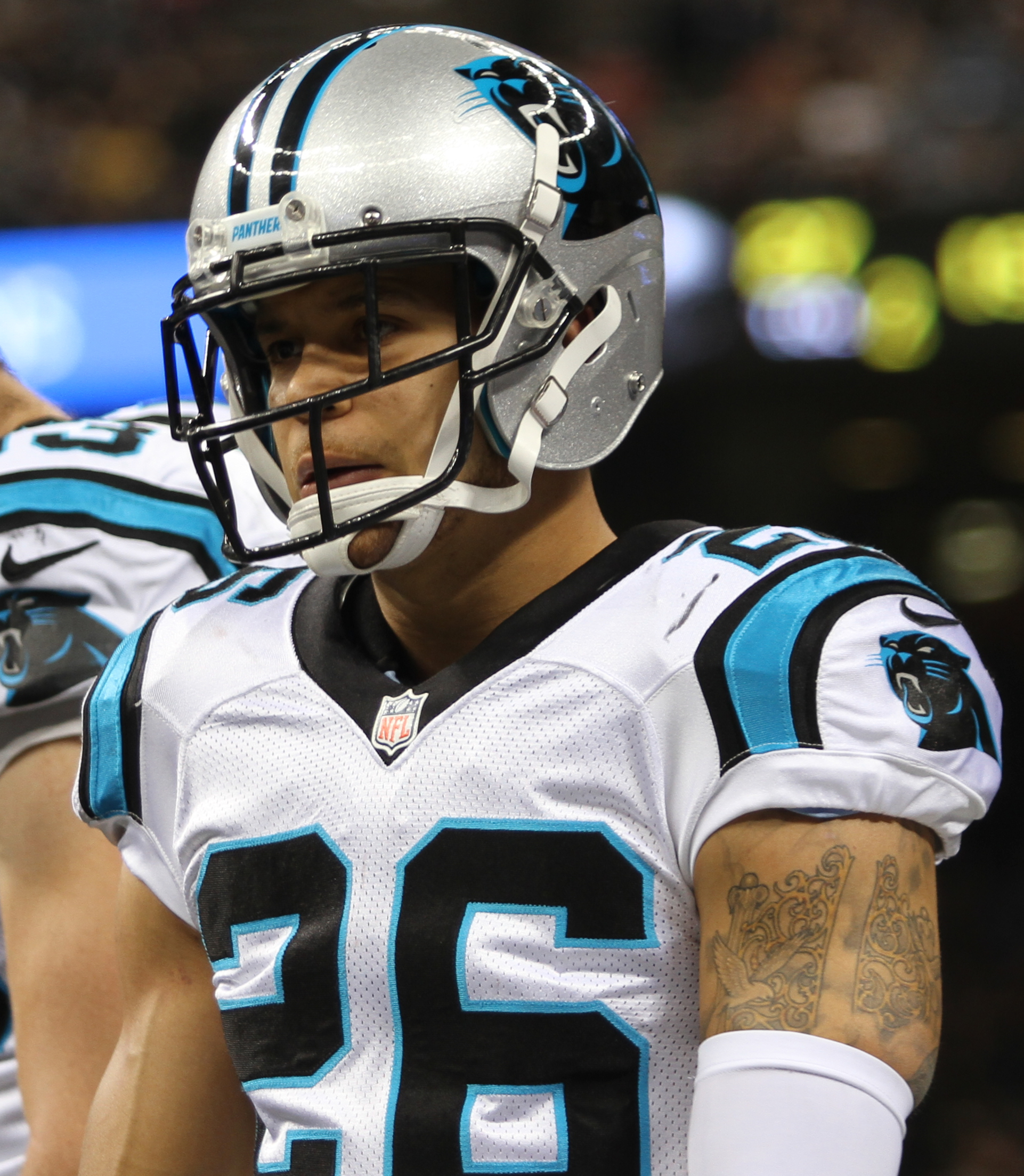
- Finnegan with the Carolina Panthers in 2015

No. 31, 24, 26, 21
- Position: Cornerback

Personal information
- Born: February 2, 1984 (age 42); Fayetteville, North Carolina, U.S.
- Listed height: 5 ft 10 in (1.78 m)
- Listed weight: 190 lb (86 kg)

Career information
- High school: Milton (Milton, Florida)
- College: Samford (2002–2005)
- NFL draft: 2006: 7th round, 215th overall pick

Career history
- Tennessee Titans (2006–2011); St. Louis Rams (2012–2013); Miami Dolphins (2014); Carolina Panthers (2015); New Orleans Saints (2016)*
- * Offseason or practice squad member only

Awards and highlights
- First-team All-Pro (2008); Pro Bowl (2008)

Career NFL statistics
- Total tackles: 662
- Sacks: 7.0
- Forced fumbles: 5
- Pass deflections: 87
- Interceptions: 18
- Defensive touchdowns: 6
- Stats at Pro Football Reference

Cortland Temujin Finnegan (born February 2, 1984) is an American former professional football player who was a cornerback in the National Football League (NFL). He played college football for the Samford Bulldogs, and was selected by the Tennessee Titans in the seventh round of the 2006 NFL draft. Finnegan was also a member of the St. Louis Rams, Miami Dolphins, Carolina Panthers and New Orleans Saints. He was a Pro Bowler in 2008.

== Early life ==
Finnegan attended Milton High School in Milton, Florida, where he starred as a safety and tailback, earning second-team All-State as a senior in 2002. He caught 22 passes for 403 yards, and also averaged 3.4 yards per rush and scored three rushing touchdowns. On defense, Finnegan recorded 65 tackles.

== College career ==
During his sophomore year, Finnegan was named first-team All-OVC, third-team All-OVC as returner, third-team All-American by Sports Network and earned Ohio Valley Conference Defensive Player of the Year honors, while starting every game. Finnegan totaled team and career-high 108 tackles, three tackles for loss, career-high three interceptions, eight passes defensed and two fumble recoveries, and he also returned 21 kickoffs for 577 yards (27.5 avg.) and one touchdown.

As a junior, Finnegan was named first-team All-OVC, while starting every game at free safety. He led his team with 86 tackles, two tackles for loss, three interceptions (tied career-high), two passes defensed and one fumble forced. Finnegan also returned 11 kickoffs for 286 yards (26.0 avg.).

During his senior year at Samford, Finnegan was named first-team All-American by NFL Draft Report, first-team All-American by American Football Coaches Association and first-team All-OVC for third consecutive year. He started every game at free safety and led team with 98 tackles for third consecutive season and added two tackles for loss, one interception, seven passes defensed, one fumble forced and one fumble recovery. Cortland Finnegan ranked first in OVC conference with 15.1 punt return average, while returning 14 punts for 212 yards and one touchdown. Ranked second in OVC conference with 25.1 kickoff return average on 15 returns for 376 yards.

== Professional career ==
=== Pre-draft ===
Playing at FCS school Samford, Finnegan was very much unnoticed and overlooked in the 2006 NFL draft. He displayed good speed at Samford's Pro Day, but lacked ideal height and was deemed a shaky tackler. Sports Illustrated projected that Finnegan would go undrafted.

Pre-draft measurables
Height	Weight	40-yard dash	20-yard shuttle	Three-cone drill	Vertical jump	Broad jump	Bench press
5 ft 9 7/8 in (1.77 m)	188 lb (85 kg)	4.34 s	4.34 s	6.95 s	44 in (1.12 m)	10 ft 8 in (3.25 m)	14 reps
All values from Pro Day.

=== Tennessee Titans ===
==== 2006 ====
The Tennessee Titans selected Finnegan in the seventh round (215th overall) of the 2006 NFL draft. He was only the third player to be drafted from Samford and was the first player to be selected from Samford in 37 years since Gary Fleming in 1969. Finnegan was the 18th cornerback selected in 2006.

On July 17, 2006, the Titans signed Finnegan to a three-year, $1.22 million rookie contract that included a signing bonus of $42,875.

Throughout training camp, Finnegan competed to be the No 2. starting cornerback against Reynaldo Hill, Eric King, Andre Woolfolk, and Michael Waddell. Head coach Jeff Fisher named Finnegan the starting nickelback and listed him as the third cornerback on the depth chart to begin the season, behind starting cornerbacks Adam "Pacman" Jones and Reynaldo Hill.

On September 10, 2006, Finnegan made his professional regular season debut and made an immediate impact in the Tennessee Titans' home-opener against the New York Jets, making six combined tackles (five solo), one pass deflection, and had his first career sack on Chad Pennington for a seven–yard loss that caused a fumble that was recovered by defensive tackle Randy Starks and led to the game-tying touchdown and two-point attempt to tie the game 16–16 on the fourth quarter. Unfortunately, the Titans would have a fail at their late comeback attempt and lost 23–16 to the Jets. On October 15, 2006, Finnegan earned his first career start as a nickelback and recorded four combined tackles (three solo) during a 25–22 victory at the Washington Redskins. In Week 11, he started in place of Reynaldo Hill as the No. 2 starting cornerback and set a season-high with 11 combined tackles (eight solo) and made two pass deflections during a 31–13 victory at the Philadelphia Eagles. On December 17, 2006, Finnegan recorded three solo tackles and scored the first touchdown of his career after he recovered a fumble, caused by linebacker David Thornton while sacking David Garrard, and returned it 92–yards for a touchdown as the Titans defeated the Jacksonville Jaguars 24–17. He finished his rookie season with 70 combined tackles (55 solo), seven pass deflections, two sacks, one fumble recovery, s forced fumble, and scored one touchdown in 16 games and two starts.

==== 2007 ====
On April 10, 2007, NFL commissioner Roger Goodell announced that Adam "Pac-Man" Jones would be suspended for the entire 2007 NFL season due to multiple off-the-field incidents and arrests. In order to find his replacement, defensive coordinator Jim Schwartz had Finnegan compete against Reynaldo Hill, Nick Harper, and Kelly Herndon. Head coach Jeff Fisher named Finnegan a starting cornerback to begin the season, pairing him with Nick Harper.

On September 9, 2007, Finnegan started in the Tennessee Titans' season-opener at the Jacksonville Jaguars and recorded five combined tackles (three solo) and set a season-high with three pass deflections during their 13–10 victory. In Week 2, Finnegan made seven combined tackles (five solo), a pass break-up, and made the first interception of his career on a pass attempt thrown by Peyton Manning to wide receiver Reggie Wayne during a 22–20 loss to the Indianapolis Colts. On November 25, 2007, he set a season-high with ten combined tackles (eight solo) during a 6–35 loss at the Cincinnati Bengals. He started in all 16 games for the first time in his career and finished the season with a total of 95 combined tackles (79 solo), 13 pass deflections, one sack, and one interception.

The Tennessee Titans finished with a 10–6 record in 2007 and earned playoff berth while placing third in the AFC South. On January 6, 2008, Finnegan started in the first playoff game in his career and recorded eight combined tackles (six solo), made one pass deflection, one sack, and intercepted a pass thrown by Philip Rivers to wide receiver Chris Chambers as the Titans lost the AFC Wild-Card Game 6–17 at the San Diego Chargers.

==== 2008 ====
On August 15, 2008, the Tennessee Titans' signed Finnegan to a four-year, $16.8 million contract extension that included $8.50 million guaranteed and an initial signing bonus of $4 million. Head coach Jeff Fisher retained Finnegan and Nick Harper as the starting cornerbacks to begin the season.

"He's always trying to strip the ball from you or something like that. I don't think that's a bad thing. I think for him it's good, because at times he can irritate you. Other than that, I think he's a good player. I think he plays real hard. The crazy thing about it is he doesn't really talk. He just goes out and plays and he's not going to say much, he's just out there playing and he's playing hard.”

(His opinion on Cortland Finnegan 2008)

— Andre Johnson (Texans' wide receiver)

On September 8, 2008, Finnegan started in the Tennessee Titans' home-opener against the Jacksonville Jaguars and recorded five solo tackles, three pass deflections, and set a season-high with two interceptions on passes thrown by David Garrard during their 10–17 victory. His Week 1 performance earned him AFC Defensive Player of the Week for the first time in his career. The following week, he made four combined tackles (three solo), one pass deflection, and intercepted a pass by Carson Palmer to wide receiver T.J. Houshmandzadeh during a 24–7 victory at the Cincinnati Bengals in Week 2. On September 21, 2008, Finnegan recorded six combined tackles (three solo), made two pass deflections, and had his first career pick-six after intercepting a pass by Matt Schaub to wide receiver Andre Johnson at the goal-line and returning it 99–yards for a touchdown at the end of the fourth quarter as the Titans defeated the Houston Texans 31–12. In Week 5, he set a season-high with eight combined tackles (six solo) during a 13–10 victory at the Baltimore Ravens. In Week 12, Finnegan made five solo tackles, one pass break-up, and set a career-high with his fifth interception of the season by intercepting a pass that was thrown by Brett Favre to wide receiver Laveranues Coles as the Titans lost 13–34 against the New York Jets. This loss to the Jets ended the Titans 10–game undefeated streak. He started all 16 games for the second consecutive season and finished with a total of 69 combined tackles (57 solo), one sack, one fumble recovery, and scored one touchdown. He set career-highs in pass deflections (17) and interceptions (5). On December 16, 2008, the NFL named Finnegan to the 2009 Pro Bowl, marking his first and only Pro Bowl of his career.

==== 2009 ====
He returned as the No. 1 starting cornerback to begin the season, along with Nick Harper. Head coach Jeff Fisher named Finnegan and Nick Harper the starting cornerbacks to start the regular season with Cary Williams and Jason McCourty as the primary backups.

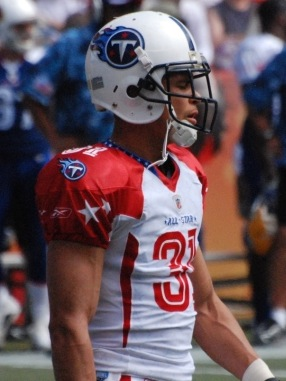
Finnegan at the 2009 Pro Bowl

On September 10, 2009, Finnegan started in the Tennessee Titans' season-opener at the Pittsburgh Steelers and set a season-high with ten combined tackles (nine solo), made one pass deflection, and intercepted a pass thrown by Ben Roethlisberger to wide receiver Mike Wallace and returned it for 80–yards before being tackled by Heath Miller and Max Starks during a 10–13 overtime loss. He was inactive for three games (Weeks 4–6) due to a hamstring injury. This was the first time Finnegan had been inactive for a game in his career after 51 consecutive games played and 35 starts in-a-row. In Week 8, he recorded three combined tackles (two solo), set a season-high with two pass deflections, and intercepted a pass thrown by David Garrard to wide receiver Mike Sims-Walker as the Titans defeated the Jacksonville Jaguars 13–30. On November 8, 2009, Finnegan made eight combined tackles (seven solo), one pass deflection, and had a pick-six after returning an interception thrown by Alex Smith to wide receiver Josh Morgan for a 39–yard touchdown during a 34–27 victory at the San Francisco 49ers. In Week 14, Finnegan made four combined tackles (three solo), two pass deflections, and set a season-high with two interceptions on passes by Keith Null as the Titans routed the St. Louis Rams 7–47. He tied his career-high of five interceptions in a season with this performance against the Rams. He finished the season with 63 combined tackles (56 solo), 11 pass deflections, five interceptions, and scored one touchdown in 13 games and 13 starts.

==== 2010 ====
The Tennessee Titans promoted Chuck Cecil to defensive coordinator after Jim Schwartz was hired as the head coach of the Detroit Lions. The Titans chose not to re-sign Nick Harper following the 2009 season. Head coach Jeff Fisher named Finnegan the No. 1 starting cornerback to begin the season and had him start alongside Jason McCourty and rookie Alterraun Verner.

"When we've got Chris Kuper with his helmet off, getting punched, it's ridiculous. If that's the type of player Cortland Finnegan wants to be, well then he's a cheap player, he's not a good player."

(Post-game interview)

— Kyle Orton (Broncos' quarterback)

Throughout the 2010 NFL season, Finnegan was involved in multiple on-the-field incidents that would bring his reputation among players in prominence. Some of these incidents coincided with a five-game losing streak and conflict in between head coach Jeff Fisher and franchise quarterback Vince Young. Beginning in Week 2, Finnegan was involved in his first on-the-field incident when he was involved in a fight in the first quarter when wide receiver Hines Ward received backlash for allegedly being too aggressive. During the third quarter, Finnegan was penalized for a personal foul for punching wide receiver Mike Wallace during the Titans' 19–11 loss against the Pittsburgh Steelers. On September 23, 2010, it was reported Finnegan received a $5,000 fine for the incident in the first quarter. In Week 3, Finnegan was involved in a physical altercation on-the-field with Giants' wide receiver Steve Smith during a 29–10 victory at the New York Giants. On October 1, 2010, NFL commissioner Roger Goodell levied a $5,000 fine on Finnegan for throwing New York Giants wide receiver Steve Smith to the ground by his helmet. On October 8, 2010, Finnegan received a $10,000 fine for unnecessary roughness which became his third game in-a-row resulting in a fine, for allegedly hitting Broncos' guard Chris Kuper after Kuper had his helmet ripped off as the Titans lost 20–26 to the Denver Broncos. The NFL issued a warning to Finnegan that any future infractions that were similar would receive increased discipline. On October 24, 2010, Finnegan made eight solo tackles, one pass deflection, and had a pick-six on an interception Kevin Kolb threw on a pass attempt to wide receiver Riley Cooper with 14 seconds remaining as the Titans defeated the Philadelphia Eagles 20–37.

In Week 10, he recorded five solo tackles, set a season-high with four pass deflections, and intercepted a pass by Chad Henne to wide receiver Brandon Marshall during a 17–29 loss at the Miami Dolphins. The following week, he set a season-high with 11 combined tackles (ten solo) during a 16–19 overtime loss against the Washington Redskins. On November 28, 2010, Finnegan was involved in his most infamous incident when he was involved in a physical altercation with Texans' wide receiver Andre Johnson that was sparked when Johnson was tasked with blocking Finnegan on a running play in the fourth quarter and delivered excessive blows ending with one to Finnegan's facemask although the play ended quickly. On the next play, Finnegan retaliated by delivering a blow back to Johnson's facemask, leading to Johnson grabbing Finnegan by the facemask and ripping off his helmet, and continued with Finnegan ripping off Johnson's helmet. Johnson then horse-collared Finnegan while throwing him to the ground and stood over Finnegan as he threw a punch to Finnegan's head. They were immediately separated by a referee and teammates and Finnegan began taunting Johnson by clapping to celebrate his oncoming ejection. They were both immediately ejected and the game was delayed for over five minutes as officials attempted to get everything back in order. As Finnegan was being escorted to the locker room, he continually taunted the crowd who were booing him as he walked through the tunnel at Reliant Stadium. At the time of the incident, the Titans were losing 0–17 at the Houston Texans in the fourth quarter and were on the cusp of their fourth loss in-a-row. On November 30, 2010, Finnegan and Andre Johnson were each levied a $25,000 fine by the NFL. He finished the season with 63 combined tackles (56 solo), 11 pass deflections, two interceptions, and one touchdown in 13 games and 13 starts.

==== 2011 ====
On January 27, 2011, the Tennessee Titans announced their decision to mutually part way with head coach Jeff Fisher after a 6–10 record in 2010. Offensive line coach Mike Munchak was promoted to head coach. On August 6, 2011, Finnegan unexpectedly left training camp as he was unhappy with his current contract and was seeking an extension. Titans' General Manager Mike Reinfeldt stated his departure was unexpected as they had just received a counteroffer from his agent and were actively negotiating a contract extension at the time he left. Two days later, Finnegan returned and publicly apologized for leaving camp and missing one day. He admitted he left due to his contract and also cited he was dealing with a personal issue. He had one–year remaining on his three–year contract and was set to receive $3.70 million in 2011. Head coach Mike Munchak named Finnegan and Jason McCourty the starting cornerbacks to begin the season.

On September 18, 2011, Finnegan recorded four solo tackles and set a season-high with three pass deflections during a 26–13 loss against the Baltimore Ravens. In Week 4, he set a season-high with 11 combined tackles (ten solo) and had one pass break-up during a 31–13 victory at the Cleveland Browns. On October 9, 2011, Finnegan made three combined tackles (two solo), one pass deflection, and had his only interception of the season on a pass Ben Roethlisberger threw to wide receiver Emmanuel Sanders during a 17–38 loss at the Pittsburgh Steelers. He started all 16 games with the Titans in 2011 and finished with 75 combined tackles (58 solo), 11 pass deflections, one sack, and one interception.

=== St. Louis Rams ===
==== 2012 ====
On March 13, 2012, the St. Louis Rams signed Finnegan to a five-year, $50 million contract including $24 million guaranteed and an initial signing bonus of $5 million. He was reunited with head coach Jeff Fisher who was his head coach with the Titans from 2006 to 2010.

Throughout training camp, Finnegan competed to be the No. 1 starting cornerback against Bradley Fletcher and rookies Janoris Jenkins and Trumaine Johnson. Head coach Jeff Fisher named Finnegan and Janoris Jenkins the starting cornerbacks to begin the season.

On September 9, 2012, Finnegan debuted with the St. Louis Rams in their season-opener at the Detroit Lions and made ten combined tackles (nine solo), a pass deflection, and had a pick-six when he intercepted a pass thrown by Matthew Stafford to wide receiver Calvin Johnson and returned it for a 31–yard touchdown as the Rams lost 23–27. The following week, Finnegan made five solo tackles, a pass deflection, and intercepted a pass attempt by Robert Griffin III to tight end Fred Davis. With 1:27 remaining in the game, Robert Griffin III would throw an incomplete pass to wide receiver Josh Morgan on third-and-eight with Finnegan in coverage. Following the failed attempt, Morgan was penalized for unnecessary roughness against Finnegan with the Rams leading 28–31. The 15–yard unnecessary roughness penalty would turn a 47–yard game-tying field goal for kicker Billy Cundiff into a 62–yard field goal attempt instead. The Redskins would take a timeout and Billy Cundiff would miss the 62–yard kick to give the Rams their first win in 2012 and under new head coach Jeff Fisher. In Week 3, Finnegan recorded three combined tackles (two solo), set a season-high with three pass deflections, and had his third consecutive game with an interception during a 6–23 loss at the Chicago Bears. He intercepted a pass by Jay Cutler to wide receiver Brandon Marshall for his third and final pick of the season. On November 25, 2012, he set a season-high with 12 combined tackles (ten solo) and made a pass deflection during a 31–17 victory at the Arizona Cardinals. He started all 16 games in 2012 and set a career-high with 101 combined tackles (83 solo) and also had nine pass deflections, three interceptions, one sack, and scored one touchdown.

==== 2013 ====
The St. Louis Rams hired Tim Walton as their new defensive coordinator, replacing Gregg Williams who was suspended for the entire 2012 NFL season due to the bountygate scandal and was released following his suspension. Head coach Jeff Fisher retained Finnegan and Janoris Jenkins as the starting cornerbacks to begin the season.

In Week 4, Finnegan recorded one solo tackle before he exited in the second quarter of an 11–35 loss against the San Francisco 49ers after he suffered an injury to his thigh while he attempted to cover Anquan Boldin on a 20–yard touchdown reception. He was sidelined due to his thigh injury for the next three games (Weeks 5–7). In Week 9, Finnegan made five combined tackles (four solo), a pass deflection, and intercepted a pass by Jake Locker to wide receiver Kenny Britt during a 21–28 loss to the Tennessee Titans. Entering Week 10, Finnegan had been demoted to a backup and Trumaine Johnson took over at starting cornerback. In Week 10, he set a season-high with eight combined tackles (seven solo) during a 38–8 victory at the Indianapolis Colts. On November 26, 2013, the Rams officially placed Finnegan on injured reserve due to a fractured orbital bone and issues with his vision. He reportedly suffered the injury in Week 4 against the 49ers and it was recommended that he should return, but ignored the advice and returned for three games. He would undergo surgery to repair the eye and orbital bone and remained inactive for the last six games (Weeks 12–17) of the season. He finished the 2013 NFL season with 27 combined tackles (23 solo), one pass deflection, and one interception in seven games and five starts.

On March 5, 2014, it was reported that the Rams would release Finnegan with three–years remaining on his contract when the new year officially began On March 13.

=== Miami Dolphins ===
On March 14, 2014, the Miami Dolphins signed Finnegan to a two-year, $11 million contract that included $5.5 million guaranteed and a signing bonus of $2 million. Throughout training camp, Finnegan competed against Jamar Taylor for the job as the No. 2 starting cornerback following the departures of Nolan Carroll and Dimitri Patterson. Head coach Joe Philbin named Finnegan and Brent Grimes the starting cornerbacks to begin the season.

On September 28, 2014, Finnegan recorded four solo tackles and scored a touchdown after a misdirected snap in shotgun by Raiders' center Stefen Wisniewski tumbled past backup quarterback Matt McGloin and was recovered by Finnegan for a 50–yard touchdown return as the Dolphins won 38–14 at the Oakland Raiders. In Week 7, he recorded four solo tackles, set a season-high with three pass deflections, and forced a fumble during a 27–14 win at the Chicago Bears. He was inactive for four games (Weeks 11–14) due to an ankle injury he sustained. He finished the 2014 NFL season with a total of 44 combined tackles (33 solo), eight pass deflections, a forced fumble, one fumble recovery, and one touchdown in 12 games and 12 starts.

On March 2, 2015, the Miami Dolphins released Finnegan after one season.

On March 11, 2015, Finnegan announced his retirement from the NFL.

=== Carolina Panthers ===
On November 30, 2015, the Carolina Panthers signed Finnegan to a one-year, $870,000 contract. The Carolina Panthers were undefeated at 12–0 at the time and cornerback Charles Tillman suffered an injury after hyperextending his knee. Head coach Ron Rivera named Finnegan the starting nickelback upon his arrival, alongside starting outside cornerbacks Josh Norman and Bene Benwikere. In Week 15, he set a season-high with five solo tackles during a 38–35 victory at the New York Giants to extend the Panthers to 14–0. He appeared in the last five games without a start and recorded 18 combined tackles (15 solo) and made one pass deflection.

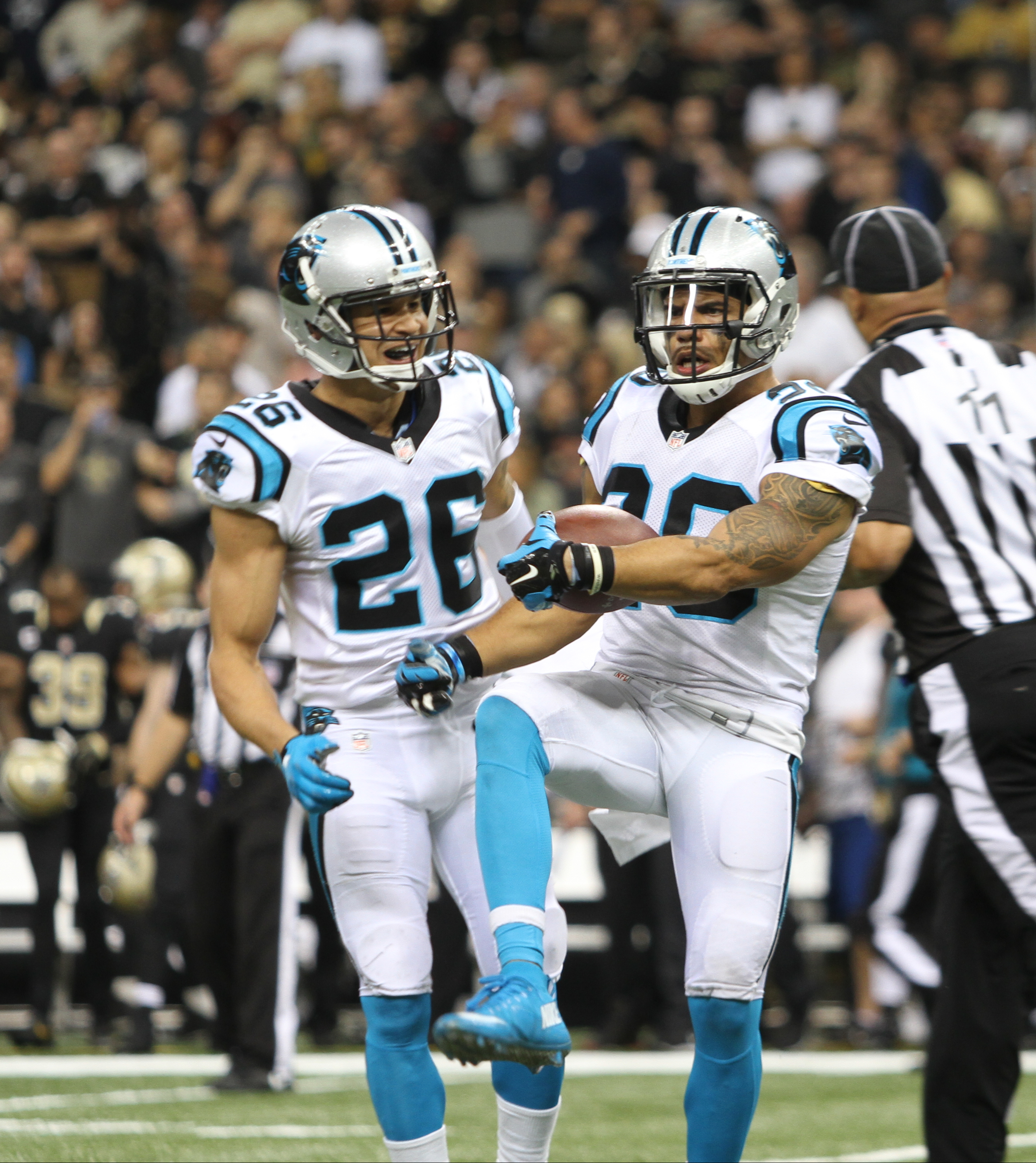
Finnegan (left) and Kurt Coleman playing for the Panthers in 2015.

The Panthers finished first in the NFC South with a 15–1 record with their only loss to the Atlanta Falcons in Week 16. On January 17, 2016, Finnegan had his best performance through the playoffs with six combined tackles (three solo), a pass deflection, and an interception on a pass by Russell Wilson to tight end Luke Willson during a 31–24 victory against the Seattle Seahawks in the Divisional Round. The following week, the Panthers routed the Arizona Cardinals 49–15 in the NFC Championship Game to advance to the Super Bowl. On February 7, 2016, Finnegan appeared in Super Bowl 50 and recorded four combined tackles (two solo) as the Panthers lost 24–10 to the Peyton Manning led Denver Broncos.

=== New Orleans Saints ===
On August 12, 2016, Finnegan signed with the New Orleans Saints. He was released as part of their final roster cuts on September 6.

== NFL career statistics ==
Legend
	Led the league
**Bold**	Career high

=== Regular season ===
Year	Team	Games		Tackles					Interceptions					Fumbles			
Year	Team	GP	GS	Cmb	Solo	Ast	Sck	TFL	Int	Yds	TD	Lng	PD	FF	FR	Yds	TD
2006	TEN	**16**	2	70	55	15	**2.0**	2	0	0	0	0	7	**1**	**2**	**92**	**1**
2007	TEN	**16**	**16**	95	79	16	1.0	3	1	14	0	14	13	**1**	0	0	0
2008	TEN	**16**	**16**	69	57	12	1.0	4	**5**	100	**1**	**99**	**17**	0	0	0	0
2009	TEN	13	13	63	56	7	0.0	0	**5**	**194**	**1**	80	11	0	1	0	0
2010	TEN	**16**	**16**	100	82	**18**	1.0	4	2	41	**1**	41	9	**1**	0	0	0
2011	TEN	**16**	**16**	75	58	17	1.0	**6**	1	8	0	8	11	0	1	0	0
2012	STL	**16**	15	**101**	**83**	**18**	1.0	3	3	68	**1**	32	9	**1**	0	0	0
2013	STL	7	5	27	23	4	0.0	0	1	1	0	1	1	0	0	0	0
2014	MIA	12	12	44	33	11	0.0	1	0	0	0	0	8	**1**	1	50	**1**
2015	CAR	5	0	18	15	3	0.0	0	0	0	0	0	1	0	0	0	0
		133	111	662	541	121	7.0	23	18	426	4	99	87	5	5	142	2

=== Playoffs ===
Year	Team	Games		Tackles					Interceptions					Fumbles			
Year	Team	GP	GS	Cmb	Solo	Ast	Sck	TFL	Int	Yds	TD	Lng	PD	FF	FR	Yds	TD
2007	TEN	1	**1**	8	**6**	2	**1.0**	0	**1**	0	0	0	**1**	**1**	0	0	0
2008	TEN	1	**1**	2	1	1	0.0	0	0	0	0	0	**1**	0	0	0	0
2015	CAR	**3**	0	**14**	**6**	**8**	0.0	0	**1**	0	0	0	**1**	0	0	0	0
		5	2	24	13	11	1.0	0	2	0	0	0	3	1	0	0	0

== Personal life ==
Finnegan is the youngest son of Robert Grant and Linda Finnegan. He has an older sister, Lela, but their older sister Felicia died when she was eight years old from congenital Down syndrome, about a decade before Cortland was born.

Finnegan is married and has a daughter, who is named after both Finnegan's sister and a girl he met while she was battling synovial sarcoma.

In 2010, Finnegan became a member of School of the Legends (SOTL), an online community and partner of the NFLPA. SOTL's headquarters are located in Nashville, Tennessee. He also became Titans' Community Man of the Year due to his fundraising efforts and the establishment of ARK 31, a non-profit charity for children with disabilities and special needs.
