= List of Samford Bulldogs in the NFL draft =

The Samford University Samford Bulldogs football team has had eight players drafted into the National Football League (NFL) since the league began holding drafts in 1936. Samford has had two former players selected to a Pro Bowl.

== Selections ==
Year	Round	Pick	Overall	Player name	Position	NFL team	Notes
1967	16	5	398	Rex Keeling	Wide receiver	Houston Oilers	—
1969	7	7	163	Gary Fleming	Defensive end	Baltimore Colts	—
2006	7	7	215	Cortland Finnegan	Defensive back	Tennessee Titans	Pro Bowl (2008)
2012	5	27	162	Corey White	Defensive back	New Orleans Saints	—
2013	7	17	223	Nick Williams	Defensive tackle	Pittsburgh Steelers	—
2015	2	14	46	Jaquiski Tartt	Defensive back	San Francisco 49ers	—
2016	2	31	62	James Bradberry	Defensive back	Carolina Panthers	Pro Bowl (2020)
2022	5	19	162	Montrell Washington	Wide receiver	Denver Broncos	—
