= Matt Daniels =

American football player and coach (born 1989)

Minnesota Vikings
- Title: Special teams coordinator

Personal information
- Born: September 27, 1989 (age 37); Tucson, Arizona, U.S.
- Listed height: 6 ft 0 in (1.83 m)
- Listed weight: 212 lb (96 kg)

Career information
- Position: Safety (No. 37, 30)
- High school: Fayette County (Fayetteville, Georgia)
- College: Duke (2008–2011)
- NFL draft: 2012: undrafted

Career history

Playing
- St. Louis Rams (2012−2013); Jacksonville Jaguars (2014); San Diego Chargers (2015)

Coaching
- Colorado (2017) Graduate assistant; Los Angeles Rams (2018–2019) Assistant special teams coach; Dallas Cowboys (2020−2021) Assistant special teams coach; Minnesota Vikings (2022–present) Special teams coordinator

Awards and highlights
- Second-team All-American (2011)

Career NFL statistics
- Total tackles: 1
- Fumble recoveries: 1
- Stats at Pro Football Reference

Matthew Wayne Daniels Jr. (born September 27, 1989) is an American professional football coach and former player who is the special teams coordinator for the Minnesota Vikings of the National Football League (NFL). He played in the NFL as a safety.

Daniels played college football for the Duke Blue Devils. He was signed by the St. Louis Rams as an undrafted free agent in 2012.

== College career ==
Daniels played college football for the Duke University Blue Devils. In 2008, as a true freshman, he played in 10 games with one start and finished the year with 22 tackles, one INT and one fumble recovery. In 2009 the sophomore safety was an Academic All-ACC selection and started all 12 games and finished third on the team and 18th in the ACC with 83 tackles and added 3.0 tackles for loss, 0.5 quarterback sacks, six pass breakups and three caused fumbles. In 2010, his junior season, Daniels was again an Academic All-ACC choice and started all 12 games and finished second on the team with 93 total tackles and added 6.0 tackles for loss, seven PBUs, three caused fumbles, two fumble recoveries and one INT. In his senior year, 2011, Daniels was a Second-team All-American and finished with 126 tackles. He graduated Duke as the school's all-time leader in several key defensive categories such as tackles, caused fumbles, and pass breakups.

== Professional career ==
Pre-draft measurables
| Height | Weight | 40-yard dash | 10-yard split | 20-yard split | 20-yard shuttle | Three-cone drill | Vertical jump | Broad jump | Bench press |
|---|---|---|---|---|---|---|---|---|---|
| 5 ft 11 3/4 in (1.82 m) | 212 lb (96 kg) | 4.48 s | 1.50 s | 2.55 s | 4.31 s | 6.90 s | 35.5 in (0.90 m) | 10 ft 4 in (3.15 m) | 15 reps |
All values from Pro Day

=== St. Louis Rams ===
In 2012, he was signed by the Rams as an undrafted free agent. He was released on August 26, 2014. He was signed to the Rams practice squad on September 1, 2014. He was released on September 3, 2014, to make room for Brad Smelley.

=== Jacksonville Jaguars ===
Daniels was signed to the Jaguars practice squad on October 27, 2014. He was promoted to the active roster on December 17. He was waived with an injury settlement on September 1, 2015.

=== San Diego Chargers ===
On November 4, 2015, the San Diego Chargers signed Daniels to the practice squad. On December 28, 2015, the San Diego Chargers promoted Daniels to the 53-man roster.

== Coaching career ==
In 2017, Daniels was a defensive graduate assistant coach at Colorado. On February 26, 2018, the Los Angeles Rams announced that they had added Daniels to their coaching staff, hiring him as assistant special teams coach. Daniels played with the Rams under current special teams coordinator John Fassel in the recent past.

After the 2019 season, he served as assistant special teams coach for the Dallas Cowboys. After two seasons there, he joined the Minnesota Vikings as the special teams coach in 2022.
