= Quinton Pointer =

American football player (born 1988)

No. 33, 42
- Position: Cornerback

Personal information
- Born: April 16, 1988 (age 38); Fort Myers, Florida, U.S.
- Listed height: 5 ft 9 in (1.75 m)
- Listed weight: 195 lb (88 kg)

Career information
- High school: Mariner (Cape Coral, Florida)
- College: Nevada-Las Vegas
- NFL draft: 2012: undrafted

Career history
- St. Louis Rams (2012−2013); Tampa Bay Buccaneers (2014)*; Baltimore Ravens (2014−2015)*; Hamilton Tiger-Cats (2016); Toronto Argonauts (2016); Baltimore Brigade (2017)
- * Offseason or practice squad member only

Career NFL statistics
- Total tackles: 6
- Stats at Pro Football Reference

Quinton Jamall Pointer (born April 16, 1988) is an American former professional football player who was a cornerback for the St. Louis Rams in the National Football League (NFL). He played college football for the UNLV Rebels and was signed by the St. Louis Rams as an undrafted free agent in 2012. He also played in the Canadian Football League (CFL)

== Early life ==
He attended Mariner High School in Cape Coral, Florida. He earned all-area and all-conference honors as a defensive back in 2005.

== College career ==
He played college football for the UNLV Rebels. He finished college with 226 tackles, 2 sacks, 6 interceptions, 21 pass deflections and 5 forced fumbles.

In his freshman year, he finished the season with 50 tackles, 2 interceptions, 4 pass deflections and a forced fumble.

In his sophomore year, he finished the season with 44 tackles, 2 interceptions, 8 pass deflections.

In his junior year, he finished the season with 42 tackles, 2 sacks, 4 pass deflections and a forced fumble.

In His senior year, he finished the season with 59 tackles, 2 sacks, 5 pass deflections and 3 forced fumbles.

== Professional career ==
=== St. Louis Rams ===
On May 8, 2012, he signed with the St. Louis Rams as an Undrafted free agent. On August 31, 2012, he made the 53 man roster. On September 14, 2012, he was released after making his NFL debut in Week 1, scoring two tackles. On September 18, 2012, he was signed to the team's practice squad. On September 21, 2013, he was signed to the team's practice squad.

=== Tampa Bay Buccaneers ===
On May 30, 2014, he signed with the Tampa Bay Buccaneers. He was released the day before the season opener on September 6, 2014 to make room for undrafted rookie Solomon Patton.

=== Baltimore Ravens ===
On December 16, 2014, Pointer was signed by the Baltimore Ravens and was placed on the practice squad. On January 12, 2015, he signed a reserve/future contract with the Ravens. On September 4, 2015, he was waived by the Ravens.

=== Hamilton Tiger-Cats ===
On April 21, 2016, Pointer signed with the Hamilton Tiger-Cats of the Canadian Football League. In seven games, Pointer recorded 16 defensive tackles & 2 sacks. On August 26, 2016, Pointer was released by the Tiger-Cats.

=== Toronto Argonauts ===
On August 26, 2016, Pointer signed with the Toronto Argonauts of the Canadian Football League.

=== Baltimore Brigade ===
On March 17, 2017, Pointer was assigned to the Baltimore Brigade of the Arena Football League.
