= 2015 Chicago Bears season =

NFL team season

- Owner: The McCaskey Family
- General manager: Ryan Pace
- Head coach: John Fox
- Home stadium: Soldier Field

Results
- Record: 6–10
- Division place: 4th NFC North
- Playoffs: Did not qualify
- Pro Bowlers: Kyle Long, RT

Uniform
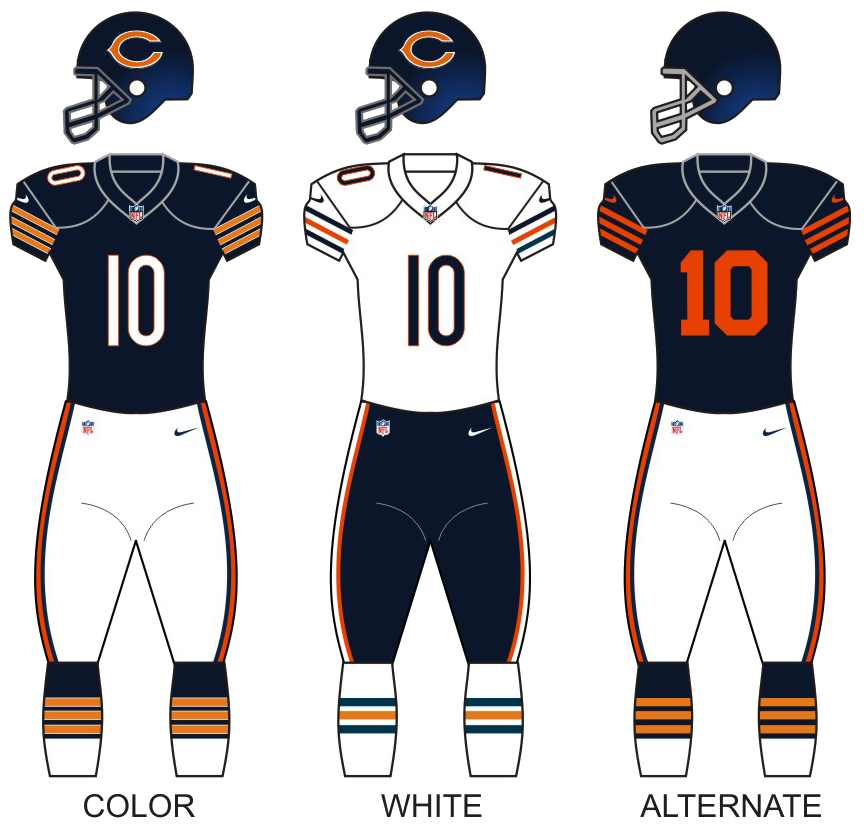

The 2015 season was the Chicago Bears' 96th in the National Football League (NFL). After the firing of general manager Phil Emery and head coach Marc Trestman following the 2014 season, the team hired former New Orleans Saints director of player personnel Ryan Pace and Denver Broncos head coach John Fox to fill those positions, respectively. Fox's hiring marked the Bears' third head coach in four seasons. This for the first time since 2002 Lance Briggs and Charles Tillman were not on the opening day roster.

The Bears entered the 2015 season with hopes of improving their 5–11 record in 2014. The team started the regular season with a rough start, losing their first three games. In the following eight games, the team went 5–3, including a Thanksgiving win over the rival Green Bay Packers. However, the Bears then lost the first three games in December, and were officially eliminated from playoff contention in week 15 by the Minnesota Vikings. In week 16 against the Tampa Bay Buccaneers, the Bears improved upon their 2014 record with a 26–21 win. After losing in the final game of the season to the Detroit Lions, the Bears ended the season 6–10 and last in the NFC North.

The 2015 Bears were more competitive in games compared to the 2014 team, with six of their ten losses being by less than a touchdown. Additionally, new coordinators Adam Gase and Vic Fangio helped revitalize the offense and defense, respectively; under Gase, quarterback Jay Cutler threw a career-low 11 interceptions and recorded a 92.3 passer rating, the highest in his career. With Fangio, the defense allowed 397 points; the last two defenses had previously allowed franchise highs in points, including 442 in 2014. However, the team was marred by injuries during the year, with only four players starting all 16 games. The Bears also went 1–7 at home in 2015, the worst home record in franchise history. This was also the first time since 1973 that the Bears failed to win a home game against a division opponent.

== Offseason ==
=== Organizational changes ===
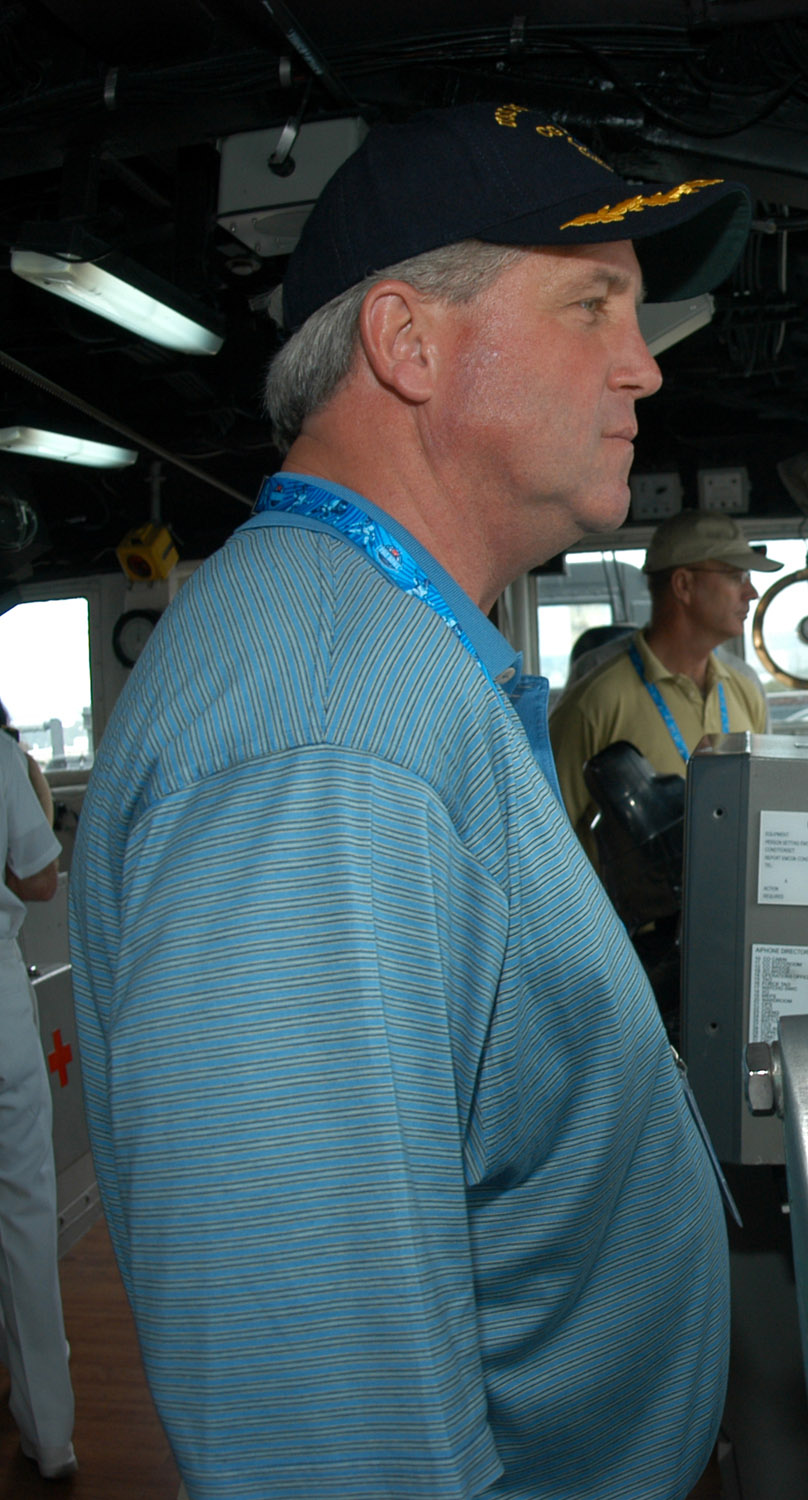
John Fox was hired by the Bears as head coach on January 16, becoming the fifteenth head coach in franchise history.

==== Front office ====
After three years, general manager Phil Emery was fired on December 29, 2014. Later in the day, former Baltimore Colts, Cleveland Browns, and New York Giants general manager and presidential assistant of Bears' founder George Halas, Ernie Accorsi, was hired by the organization as a consultant to help the team find a new GM and head coach.

On December 29, NFL Network insider Ian Rapoport reported that the Bears had four candidates for the GM position: Kansas City Chiefs director of player personnel and former Bears' director of pro scouting Chris Ballard, Giants' vice president of player evaluation and 2012 finalist for the Bears' GM job Marc Ross, Tennessee Titans vice president of player personnel Lake Dawson, and Baltimore Ravens director of pro personnel Vince Newsome. Ravens' assistant general manager Eric DeCosta was also rumored to be a potential candidate by Dan Pompei, while Minnesota Vikings assistant GM George Paton declined an offer. DeCosta later announced his intention to remain with the Ravens. Later in the week, Chicago requested an interview with New Orleans Saints director of player personnel Ryan Pace and Houston Texans director of pro scouting Brian Gaine.

On January 6, the Bears conducted interviews for general manager with Gaine and Dawson. Ballard and Pace were interviewed the next day, and Pace was hired on January 8. On January 13, director of pro personnel Kevin Turks was fired. The Bears hired former Saints area scout Josh Lucas as their director of player personnel on January 18. In the scouting department, three scouts were hired on May 15. Ravens national scout Joe Douglas became the director of college scouting, Broncos assistant director of pro personnel Anthony Kelly as director of pro scouting and New York Jets area scout Christopher Prescott was hired in the same role.

==== Coaching ====
On the same day of Emery's firing, two-year head coach Marc Trestman was also fired, as was offensive coordinator Aaron Kromer. Quarterbacks coach Matt Cavanaugh's contract expired on the same day, and was not retained by the team.

In the hunt for a new head coach, the Bears requested interviews with Denver Broncos offensive coordinator Adam Gase, Arizona Cardinals defensive coordinator Todd Bowles, Seattle Seahawks defensive coordinator Dan Quinn, and Detroit Lions defensive coordinator Teryl Austin. The team also showed interest in Ravens' offensive coordinator Gary Kubiak and former Buffalo Bills head coach Doug Marrone. However, Kubiak announced on January 11 that he will stay with Baltimore.

The Bears went to Seattle on January 2 to interview Quinn, and the following day, interviewed Gase in Denver. Bowles was interviewed on January 8, while Austin and Marrone were interviewed five days later. On January 14, former Broncos' head coach John Fox, who had been released on January 12, was interviewed. Two days after his interview, Fox was hired, signing a four-year contract.

Looking for an offensive coordinator, the Bears requested an interview with Titans tight ends coach Mike Mularkey, but were denied. The Bears also showed interest in San Francisco 49ers quarterback coach Geep Chryst and former Kansas head coach Charlie Weis for the OC position. Gase was selected for the OC role on January 21. Defensively, 49ers DC Vic Fangio was hired on January 20, and brought 49ers defensive backs coach Ed Donatell to serve the same position, replacing Jon Hoke. At the NFL Scouting Combine, the Bears announced that they would be switching to a base 3–4 defense in 2015, a defensive scheme that Fangio had operated in San Francisco. Four of Fox's assistants with the Broncos were brought to Chicago: Broncos special teams coordinator Jeff Rodgers was hired on January 19, replacing Joe DeCamillis; the next day, assistant defensive backs coach Sam Garnes, offensive line coach Dave Magazu and assistant special teams coach Derius Swinton II were hired for the same positions they had served in Denver. The same day, defensive coordinator Mel Tucker, DeCamillis, tight ends coach Andy Bischoff, linebackers coach Reggie Herring and assistant special teams coach Dwayne Stukes were all officially released. To replace Cavanaugh and Herring, respectively, the Browns' Dowell Loggains and Atlanta Falcons' Glenn Pires were hired. Saints' assistant offensive line coach Frank Smith succeeded Bischoff at the tight ends coach spot after being hired on January 22. Three days later, defensive line coach Paul Pasqualoni left the Bears to join the Houston Texans, and Broncos DL coach Jay Rodgers was hired. Two days later, Bears assistant DL coach Clint Hurtt was reassigned to outside linebackers. On February 10, Ohio State running backs coach Stan Drayton joined the Bears to serve the same position. The next day, North Shore Senior High School assistant football coach and former NFL player Ben Wilkerson was hired as assistant OL coach, while incumbent OL coach Pat Meyer was not retained.

On January 21, strength and conditioning coach Mike Clark was fired. The next day, the Broncos' Jason George was hired to take his place. Broncos offensive quality control coach Bo Hardegree was hired as an offensive assistant on January 24. Three days later, Chicago offensive quality control coaches Carson Walch and Brendan Nugent were fired. On February 4, Central Michigan director of strength and conditioning Rick Perry was hired as an assistant strength coach. On February 10, the team announced they would not retain defensive quality control coach Chris Harris.

=== Roster changes ===
Position	Player	Free agency tag	Date signed	2015 team
LB	Lance Briggs	UFA	–	–
G/OT	Eben Britton	UFA	–	–
LS	Jeremy Cain	UFA	–	–
QB	Jimmy Clausen	UFA	March 6	Chicago Bears
S	Chris Conte	UFA	March 12	Tampa Bay Buccaneers
C/G	Brian de la Puente	UFA	–	–
K	Jay Feely	UFA	–	–
CB	Demontre Hurst	ERFA	February 25	Chicago Bears
DE	Austen Lane	UFA	–	–
CB	Al Louis-Jean	ERFA	February 4	Chicago Bears
S	Danny McCray	UFA	May 14	Dallas Cowboys
CB	Sherrick McManis	UFA		
TE	Zach Miller	UFA	February 27	Chicago Bears
WR	Josh Morgan	UFA	May 17	New Orleans Saints
FB	Montell Owens	UFA	–	–
DT	Stephen Paea	UFA	March 10	Washington Redskins
TE	Dante Rosario	UFA	–	–
DE	Trevor Scott	UFA	–	–
LB	Darryl Sharpton	UFA	May 13	Arizona Cardinals
CB	Charles Tillman	UFA	April 9	Carolina Panthers
S	Anthony Walters	UFA	–	–
LB	DeDe Lattimore	ERFA	January 30	Chicago Bears
LB	D. J. Williams	UFA	–	–
RFA: Restricted free agent, UFA: Unrestricted free agent, ERFA: Exclusive rights free agent LEGEND – Light green background indicates a player has been re-signed by the Bears. – Light red background indicates a player has departed the Bears.

The Bears entered the new league year with 23 free agents, three of whom were exclusive rights free agents. The NFL's deadline to apply the franchise tag to players was on March 2, though the Bears did not tag any players. Free agency officially began on March 10.

==== Acquisitions ====
The first signing of 2015 was on January 28, when the Bears signed Toronto Argonauts receiver John Chiles to a reserve/future contract.

On the second day of free agency, the Bears signed Ravens linebacker Pernell McPhee to a five-year deal worth $38.75 million with $15.5 million guaranteed, and New York Giants safety Antrel Rolle ($11.25 million, $5 million guaranteed), and San Diego Chargers receiver Eddie Royal ($15 million, $10 million guaranteed) to three-year deals.

Afterwards, the Bears began signing players to one-year deals. On March 16, Vikings offensive lineman Vladimir Ducasse agreed to a contract; two days later, Chiefs long-snapper Thomas Gafford was signed. From March 24–27, the Bears added four defenders: defensive ends Jarvis Jenkins (Redskins) and Ray McDonald (49ers) on March 24, Tampa Bay Buccaneers linebacker Mason Foster on March 25, and Jacksonville Jaguars cornerback Alan Ball on March 27. On March 31, Falcons running back Jacquizz Rodgers joined the team. The first signing of April occurred on the first day, when Cardinals linebacker Sam Acho was acquired, and the next day, former Broncos center Will Montgomery was signed. Later in the month, on April 23, Falcons tight end Bear Pascoe was signed. June's first acquisition was also a one-year signing, when the team signed Tracy Porter on June 8.

On April 30, Chiefs safety Malcolm Bronson was signed to a two-year deal. On May 11, the Bears signed quarterback Pat Devlin, linebacker Kyle Woestmann and defensive tackle Terry Williams to three-year contracts. The next day, New York Jets tight end Chris Pantale was claimed off waivers. On June 18, safety Sherrod Martin and running back Daniel Thomas agreed to contracts of one year. Two days before the start of training camp, on July 27, the team signed Arizona Rattlers receiver/returner A. J. Cruz, while former Cardinals defensive lineman David Carter was acquired the next day.

==== Departures ====
On March 6, the Bears agreed to trade receiver Brandon Marshall to the Jets for a fifth-round draft pick; the trade did not become official until the start of free agency.

Defensive tackle Stephen Paea was the first of the Bears' free agents to leave the team, signing with the Redskins on March 10. Two days later, safety Chris Conte joined the Buccaneers. On April 9, cornerback Charles Tillman was signed by the Panthers. On May 13, 14 and 17, linebacker Darryl Sharpton, cornerback Danny McCray and receiver Josh Morgan departed the Bears to sign with the Cardinals, Cowboys and Saints, respectively.

On April 2, safety Anthony Walters and center Roberto Garza, who had been the team's longest-tenured player, were released after ten seasons. On May 11, linebacker Khaseem Greene and defensive lineman Austen Lane were released, and eleven days later, newly acquired defensive tackle Ray McDonald was released after being accused of domestic violence and child endangerment. On June 18, Pat Devlin and tight end Jacob Maxwell were released, as was Jonathan Brown ten days later.

=== 2015 NFL draft ===
==== Pre-draft ====
On March 26, NFL.com analyst Lance Zierlein wrote that the Bears' five biggest needs entering the draft were at outside linebacker, nose tackle, offensive line, safety, and wide receiver. The general consensus regarding the Bears' seventh-overall pick was to select an edge rusher like Vic Beasley (Clemson), Dante Fowler (Florida), Shane Ray (Missouri) and Randy Gregory (Nebraska), though WBBM-TV's Greg Gabriel believed the Bears should trade down from the pick, with players like Arik Armstead (Oregon), Danny Shelton (Washington), Eddie Goldman (Florida State), Jordan Phillips (Oklahoma) and Malcom Brown (Texas) being fits for the Bears' new 3–4 defense if the Bears were to trade down to a spot between 10th and 20th. Another suggested position to draft with the first-rounder was wide receiver, particularly Alabama's Amari Cooper, who, despite not being considered "a true need, a talent like his would be tough to pass up here." A defensive position considered for the pick was nose tackle; Sports Illustrated writer Andy Staples believed a 3–4 defense should focus on NT, and as a result, the Bears should draft Shelton, followed by a linebacker in later rounds, such as Eric Kendricks (UCLA), Benardrick McKinney (Mississippi State), Stephone Anthony (Clemson) and Paul Dawson (TCU) in the second round, and afterwards, draft a running back like Buck Allen (USC) or Mike Davis (South Carolina).

Prior to the draft, the Bears met with 37 players; 25 had private visits, 6 met at the NFL Scouting Combine, 4 met at their college's Pro Days, 3 had meetings at the Senior Bowl and the East–West Shrine Game. Iowa State's David Irving was the only player to have a workout with the team. The team held a local Pro Day on April 7, which featured players from the Chicago area, including: Northwestern quarterback Trevor Siemian, safety Ibraheim Campbell and receiver Kyle Prater, quarterbacks Taylor Graham (Hawaii), Chandler Whitmer (Connecticut) and Matt Behrendt (Wisconsin-Whitewater), safety Corey Cooper (Nebraska), offensive lineman Arthur Ray Jr. (Michigan State) and tight ends Matt LaCosse (Illinois), James O'Shaughnessy (Illinois State) and E. J. Bibbs (Iowa State).

==== Draft class ====
The Bears attempted to trade quarterback Jay Cutler to the Titans for their #2 overall pick, but Tennessee was not interested. Eventually, the Bears drafted West Virginia receiver Kevin White with the seventh-overall pick; considered the top receiver in the 2015 draft class by NFL.com analyst Mike Mayock, White caught 109 passes for 1,447 yards and 10 touchdowns in 2014. In the second round, Florida State defensive lineman Eddie Goldman was selected; considered a first-round prospect who had fallen due to his toughness, the 2014 Associated Press All-American recorded 35 tackles, four sacks and eight tackles for loss in his final college season. With their third-rounder, Oregon center Hroniss Grasu was drafted; the 2013 and 2014 Rimington Trophy finalist, the Bears were convinced by guard Kyle Long to draft his former Oregon teammate. With White and Grasu's selections, this marked the first time since 2008 that the Bears drafted at least two offensive players with their first three picks. In the fourth round, Michigan State running back Jeremy Langford was selected; during his time with Michigan State, he recorded 2,967 rushing yards and 40 touchdowns on 577 carries, while also recording 18 games with 100+ rushing yards, the third-most in school history. He holds the Spartans' record for the most consecutive Big Ten Conference games with 100 rushing yards with 15, ending his college career with 16. The Bears drafted their second defensive player in the fifth round, Penn State safety Adrian Amos; having started 38 consecutive games for the Nittany Lions, Amos recorded 42 tackles and three interceptions in 2014, with career totals of 149 tackles, seven interceptions, three sacks and nine tackles for loss. The Bears' final pick of the draft was in the sixth round, drafting TCU tackle Tayo Fabuluje; the 2012 Big 12 Conference Newcomer of the Year, he skipped football in 2013 due to family issues before returning in 2014 to help TCU win the Big 12 title.

Each of the draft class members agreed to four-year deals with the Bears. Langford, Amos and Fabuluje were the first to sign, doing so on May 5. The following day, White and Goldman were signed. Grasu was the last player to sign a contract, agreeing to a deal on May 8.

2015 Chicago Bears draft
Round	Pick	Player	Position	College	Notes
1	7	Kevin White	WR	West Virginia	
2	39	Eddie Goldman	DT	Florida State	
3	71	Hroniss Grasu	C	Oregon	
4	106	Jeremy Langford	RB	Michigan State	
5	142	Adrian Amos	S	Penn State	
6	183	Tayo Fabuluje	OT	TCU	
Made roster † Pro Football Hall of Fame * Made at least one Pro Bowl during career

Notes

- The Bears traded their original 2015 fifth-round selection (No. 143 overall) along with their 2014 fifth-round selection to the Denver Broncos in exchange for the Broncos' 2014 fourth- and seventh-round selections.
- The Bears traded wide receiver Brandon Marshall and their seventh-round selection (No. 224 overall) to the New York Jets in exchange for the Jets' fifth-round selection (No. 142 overall).

==== Undrafted free agents ====
After the draft, on May 3, the Bears signed 15 undrafted free agents. On offense, six players were signed: ECU quarterback Shane Carden, who completed 63.5 percent of his passes for 4,736 yards, 30 touchdowns and 10 interceptions in 2014; Coastal Carolina guard Chad Hamilton, who was named to first-team All-Big South Conference in 2013 and 2014; Arkansas tackle Cameron Jefferson, who was an honorable mention for the All-Mountain West Conference team while playing for UNLV; Illinois State receiver Cameron Meredith, who led the Redbirds with 66 receptions for 1,061 yards and nine touchdowns in 2014; Baylor receiver and punt returner Levi Norwood, who holds the school record for the most punt return touchdowns with two in 2013, while also catching 128 passes for 1,626 yards and 11 touchdowns; and Alabama tight end Brian Vogler, who recorded 17 catches for 125 yards and two touchdowns in four years.

Defensively, seven players were signed: TCU linebacker Jonathan Anderson, who recorded 30 tackles and 4.5 tackles-for-loss in 2014; Rice cornerback Bryce Callahan, who recorded 145 tackles, 13 interceptions (second-most in school history), 14 tackles-for-loss, two sacks, two forced fumbles and a fumble recovery in 47 college games, including a career-best 43 tackles in 2014; East Central cornerback Qumain Black, a 2013 first-team All-Great American Conference member during his time at Northeastern Oklahoma A&M College, who had 25 tackles and an interception with East Central in 2014; UCF cornerback Jacoby Glenn, who recorded 48 tackles and seven picks in 2014, and was named second-team All-American (UCF's first All-American since 2007) and American Athletic Conference Co-Defensive Player of the Year; UCLA safety Anthony Jefferson, who led the Bruins with eight pass breakups while ranking third with 72 tackles, awarding him a spot on the second-team All-Pac-12 Conference roster; Miami defensive end Olsen Pierre, who recorded 96 tackles, nine tackles-for-loss, 2.5 sacks, two forced fumbles, a fumble recovery and six pass breakups in 44 college games; and Washington linebacker John Timu, who recorded 108 tackles, two interceptions, and two touchdowns in 2014. Chicago also signed two special-teamers: Toledo kicker Jeremiah Detmer, the 2013 Mid-American Conference Special Teams Player of the Year, who had an 84.4 conversion percentage during his career; and Old Dominion long snapper Rick Lovato, who didn't miss a game in college. However, Detmer was released on June 18.

=== Offseason activities ===
The Bears held a voluntary offseason program on April 13, with the players focusing on strength and conditioning. Due to having a new head coach, a voluntary veteran minicamp was held on April 28–30. A rookie minicamp was held on May 8–10, while ten organized team activities were scheduled, three of which were open to the media (May 27, June 3, June 10). Finally, a mandatory full-squad minicamp was held on June 16–18.

Players reported to Training Camp in Olivet Nazarene University in Bourbonnais on July 29, though practice officially began the following day. The camp lasted until August 16, though no practices were held on August 4, 9 and 12–14.

During the timespan of Training Camp prior to the first game of the preseason, various transactions occurred. On the first day of camp, rookie Chad Hamilton retired, and on July 31, Tyler Moore was signed to a three-year contract to take his place. On August 5, tight end Brian Vogler was released. Six days later, guard Ryan Groy was traded to the New England Patriots for linebacker Matthew Wells.

== Preseason ==
=== Transactions ===
Preseason roster changes

Additions

- On August 15, the Bears signed Jeremy Kelley.
- On August 24, the Bears signed Lucas Nix.
- On September 1, the Bears signed Zac Dysert and Gannon Sinclair off waivers.
- On September 2, the Bears acquired Khari Lee in a trade with the Houston Texans.
- On September 6, the Bears claimed Harold Jones-Quartey and Patrick Omameh off waivers.
- On September 12, the Bears elevated Lamin Barrow to the active roster.

Departures

- On August 15, the Bears released DeDe Lattimore.
- On August 24, the Bears released Jason Weaver.
- On August 30, the Bears released Tim Jennings, Daniel Thomas, John Chiles, Malcolm Bronson, Khaseem Greene, Cameron Jefferson, Jeremy Kelley, Al Louis-Jean, Rick Lovato, Levi Norwood, Chris Pantale and Olsen Pierre.
- On September 1, the Bears released Shane Carden and Lucas Nix.
- On September 5, the Bears released A. J. Cruz, Jonathan Anderson, David Bass, Qumain Black, Conor Boffeli, Brandon Dunn, Zac Dysert, Jacoby Glenn, Rashad Lawrence, Tyler Moore, Michael Ola, Gannon Sinclair, Ify Umodu, Matthew Wells, Terry Williams, Kyle Woestmann, David Carter, Mason Foster, Bear Pascoe and Dante Rosario.
- On September 6, the Bears released Sherrod Martin and Jordan Mills.
- On September 14, the Bears released Sam Acho.

Reserve lists

- On August 30, the Bears placed Ryan Mundy and Kevin White on the reserve/injured and reserve/physically unable to perform list, respectively.
- On September 1, the Bears placed Senorise Perry on the reserve/injured list.
- On September 5, the Bears placed Anthony Jefferson and Jeremiah Ratliff on the reserve/injured and reserve/suspended list, respectively.

Practice squad additions

- On September 7, the Bears added Jonathan Anderson, Lamin Barrow, Nick Becton, Brandon Dunn, Jacoby Glenn, Paul Lasike, Jalen Saunders, Gannon Sinclair, Ify Umodu and Terry Williams to the practice squad.
- On September 9, the Bears added Bronson Hill to the practice squad.

Practice squad departures

- On September 8, the Bears removed Paul Lasike from the practice squad.

== Staff ==
2015 Chicago Bears staff
Front office: Secretary of the board of directors – Virginia Halas McCaskey; Chairman – George McCaskey; President/CEO – Ted Phillips; general manager – Ryan Pace; Vice president of football administration/general counsel – Cliff Stein; Director of pro personnel – Champ Kelly; Director of college scouting – Joe Douglas; Area scout – Mark Sadowski; Director of player personnel – Josh Lucas; Director of football administration – Joey Laine; Head coaches: Head coach – John Fox; Offensive coaches: Offensive coordinator – Adam Gase; Quarterbacks – Dowell Loggains; Running backs – Stan Drayton; Wide receivers – Mike Groh; Tight ends – Frank Smith; Offensive line – Dave Magazu; Assistant offensive line – Ben Wilkerson; Offensive assistant – Bo Hardegree	Defensive coaches: Defensive coordinator – Vic Fangio; Defensive line – Jay Rodgers; Inside linebackers – Glenn Pires; Outside linebackers – Clint Hurtt; Defensive backs – Ed Donatell; Assistant defensive backs – Sam Garnes; Defensive quality control – Sean Desai; Special teams coaches: Special teams coordinator – Jeff Rodgers; Assistant special teams – Derius Swinton II; Strength and conditioning: Strength and conditioning – Jason George; Assistant strength and conditioning – Jim Arthur; Assistant strength and conditioning – Pierre Ngo; Assistant strength and conditioning – Rick Perry

== Final roster ==
2015 Chicago Bears roster
Quarterbacks (QB): 6 Jay Cutler; 12 David Fales; Running backs (RB): 25 Ka'Deem Carey; 22 Matt Forte; 33 Jeremy Langford; Wide receivers (WR): 11 Josh Bellamy; 80 Marc Mariani; 81 Cameron Meredith; 19 Eddie Royal; 14 Deonte Thompson; Tight ends (TE): 88 Rob Housler; 82 Khari Lee; 86 Zach Miller	Offensive linemen (OL): 71 Nick Becton T; 74 Jermon Bushrod T; 62 Vladimir Ducasse G; 73 Tayo Fabuluje T; 55 Hroniss Grasu C; 72 Charles Leno T; 75 Kyle Long T; 65 Patrick Omameh G; 68 Matt Slauson G/C; Defensive linemen (DL): 76 Bruce Gaston NT; 96 Jarvis Jenkins DE; 90 Greg Scruggs DE; 70 D'Anthony Smith NT; 93 Will Sutton DE; 98 Mitch Unrein DE; 79 Terry Williams NT	Linebackers (LB): 49 Sam Acho OLB; 58 Jonathan Anderson ILB; 57 Lamin Barrow ILB; 99 Lamarr Houston OLB; 59 Christian Jones ILB; 50 Shea McClellin ILB; 92 Pernell McPhee OLB; 52 LaRoy Reynolds ILB; 53 John Timu ILB; 97 Willie Young OLB; Defensive backs (DB): 38 Adrian Amos FS; 24 Alan Ball CB; 37 Bryce Callahan CB; 23 Kyle Fuller CB; 39 Jacoby Glenn CB; 30 Demontre Hurst SS; 36 Sherrod Martin FS; 27 Sherrick McManis CB; 29 Harold Jones-Quartey SS; 21 Tracy Porter CB; 31 Chris Prosinski SS; Special teams (ST): 9 Robbie Gould K; 16 Pat O'Donnell P; 48 Patrick Scales LS	Practice squad: 20 De'Vante Bausby CB; 2 Matt Blanchard QB; 67 Davon Coleman DE; 60 Cornelius Edison C; 47 Paul Lasike FB; 85 Marcus Lucas TE; 45 Danny Mason ILB; 15 Nathan Palmer WR; -- Jalen Saunders WR (IR); 84 Gannon Sinclair TE; 63 Martin Wallace T; Reserve: 83 Martellus Bennett TE (IR); 95 Ego Ferguson DE (IR); 91 Eddie Goldman NT (IR); 46 Anthony Jefferson SS (IR); 17 Alshon Jeffery WR (IR); 64 Will Montgomery C (IR); 21 Ryan Mundy SS (IR); 32 Senorise Perry RB (IR); 35 Jacquizz Rodgers RB (IR); 26 Antrel Rolle SS (IR); 94 Cornelius Washington DE (IR); 78 Jason Weaver T (IR); 13 Kevin White WR (PUP); 10 Marquess Wilson WR (IR); Rookies in italics 53 active, 15 reserve, 10 practice squad

=== Schedule ===
The Bears preseason schedule was released on April 9. The team opened the preseason at home against the Miami Dolphins, who had defeated the Bears in their meeting in 2014, followed by visiting two 2014 playoff teams in the Indianapolis Colts and Cincinnati; the Bears had last faced the two teams in the season openers of 2012 and 2013, respectively. Chicago ended the preseason hosting annual preseason opponent Cleveland Browns, who the Bears had lost to in the 2014 preseason game.

Week	Date	Opponent	Result	Record	Game site	GameBook	NFL.com recap
1	August 13	Miami Dolphins	W 27–10	1–0	Soldier Field	GameBook	Recap
2	August 22	at Indianapolis Colts	W 23–11	2–0	Lucas Oil Stadium	GameBook	Recap
3	August 29	at Cincinnati Bengals	L 10–21	2–1	Paul Brown Stadium	GameBook	Recap
4	September 3	Cleveland Browns	W 24–0	3–1	Soldier Field	GameBook	Recap

=== Game summaries ===
The Bears struggled early in the preseason-opening game, starting with the Dolphins scoring on the opening drive with Ryan Tannehill's two-yard touchdown pass to Jarvis Landry, concluding a 14-play, 85-yard drive. On the first offensive play, tackle Jordan Mills was penalized for a false start, and after four plays, the Bears punted; Chicago would not score until early in the second quarter with Robbie Gould's 48-yard field goal. The Dolphins responded to the field goal with Caleb Sturgis' 31-yard field goal later in the quarter. With 1:02 left in the first half, backup quarterback Jimmy Clausen attempted to lead a two-minute drill, and the offense reached the Dolphins' 16-yard line, but with no timeouts and wide receiver Josh Bellamy being unable to get out of bounds, the clock ran out. Early in the second half, cornerback Sherrick McManis pulled the ball away from Mike Gillislee, and recovered at the Dolphins' 37, which led to Gould's 23-yard field goal; after Miami punted, Gould narrowed the margin by one point with a 21-yard kick. On the Dolphins' next play, McLeod Bethel-Thompson was intercepted by linebacker John Timu; seven plays later, runningback Ka'Deem Carey scored on a one-yard touchdown run to give the Bears the lead, followed by Clausen's two-point conversion pass to wide receiver A. J. Cruz. In the fourth quarter, Bethel-Thompson was intercepted by linebacker Sam Acho on the Miami 13, which led to Gould kicking a 27-yard field goal; later in the quarter, the Bears increased their lead with runningback Senorise Perry's 54-yard touchdown run, making the score 27–10. After the Dolphins turned the ball over on downs and the Bears punted, the game concluded with Miami's Josh Freeman being intercepted by defensive back Malcolm Bronson.

Against the Colts, the Bears led early with Gould's 50-yard and 38-yard field goals, and both teams traded the lead with each of their next scores in the half: Indianapolis scored on Andrew Luck's 5-yard touchdown run and eventual two-point conversion pass to Andre Johnson, which Chicago responded with Gould's 25-yarder, though the Colts ended the half with the 11–9 lead via Adam Vinatieri's 25-yard kick. During the first half, the Bears had a first quarter 12-yard touchdown scramble by Cutler nullified by lineman Kyle Long's holding penalty. The game's lone two interceptions occurred during the second quarter on consecutive drives: Indianapolis quarterback Matt Hasselbeck's pass for Donte Moncrief was intercepted by Terrance Mitchell, and Clausen's pass for tight end Dante Rosario was underthrown, being intercepted by Sheldon Prince. The Bears reclaimed the lead on their first possession of the second half with Clausen's 12-yard touchdown pass to Bellamy, which was established after Jeremy Langford's 46-yard run. On the Colts' next driver, Hasselbeck was sacked by Acho, leading to defensive tackle Eddie Goldman recovering the ensuing fumble. The margin was increased on the fifth play of the Bears' next drive, with Langford scoring on a two-yard run.

Chicago's top four receivers, Alshon Jeffery, Eddie Royal, Marquess Wilson and Kevin White, were not active for the game in Cincinnati. During the game, Perry, Clausen, cornerback Tracy Porter, wide receiver John Chiles and linebacker Jon Bostic also suffered injuries. Penalties were a concern for the Bears, who committed 12 for 117 yards; the offense also struggled on converting third downs, with only two of eleven successful. On defense, the Bears allowed the Bengals to score three unanswered touchdowns: in the first quarter with Andy Dalton's one-yard run, and in the second with A. J. McCarron's touchdown pass to Marvin Jones and Jeremy Hill's one-yard run. It would not be until the final six seconds of the half that the Bears scored, with Gould's 34-yard field goal. The first-team offense left the game during the third quarter, with all but one drive having ended in a punt, and on four of those drives, the unit failed to record a first down. Halfway through the final quarter, the Bears were able to make the score 21–10 after Ify Umodu blocked Kevin Huber's punt and returned it for an eight-yard touchdown.

Chicago scored first in the second quarter of the preseason-ending game against Cleveland with David Fales' 19-yard touchdown pass to wide receiver Marc Mariani, after capitalizing on linebacker Lamarr Houston forcing Darius Jennings to fumble and Mitchell recovered. On the Browns' next drive, the Bears' linebacker Jonathan Anderson sacked Thad Lewis, leading to another fumble, this time recovered by defensive lineman Cornelius Washington; however, Gould missed a 43-yard field goal. In the third quarter, Fales was able to throw an 11-yard touchdown pass to Umodu after escaping Tank Carder's blitz. Later in the quarter, Sherrod Martin intercepted Lewis and scored on the ensuing 25-yard return. With 5:35 remaining in the game, Gould scored the final points of the game with a 28-yard field goal, as the Bears recorded the team's first preseason shutout since 1994. By the end of the game, the defense excelled, with seven sacks, three turnovers forced and limiting the Browns to 2.7 yards per play. The Bears concluded the preseason with a 3–1 record, while also not allowing a score in the second half across the four games; turnover-wise, the Bears forced ten, while allowing only one.

== Regular season ==
=== Transactions ===
Regular season roster changes

Additions

- On September 14, the Bears signed Sam Acho.
- On September 16, the Bears signed Lavar Edwards.
- On September 19, the Bears elevated Brandon Dunn to the active roster.
- On September 22, the Bears elevated David Fales to the active roster.
- On September 25, the Bears signed Mitch Unrein.
- On September 29, the Bears signed Chris Prosinski and LaRoy Reynolds.
- On October 3, the Bears signed Spencer Lanning.
- On October 6, the Bears elevated Nick Becton to the active roster and signed Sherrod Martin
- On October 7, the Bears elevated Demontre Hurst to the active roster.
- On October 12, the Bears signed Antone Smith.
- On October 14, the Bears elevated Jonathan Anderson to the active roster.
- On October 17, the Bears signed Bruce Gaston.
- On October 19, the Bears elevated Bryce Callahan to the active roster.
- On October 22, the Bears signed Ziggy Hood.
- On November 10, the Bears elevated Deonte Thompson to the active roster.
- On November 17, the Bears elevated Jacoby Glenn to the active roster.
- On November 23, the Bears elevated David Fales to the active roster.
- On November 28, the Bears signed Patrick Scales.
- On December 8, the Bears signed Rob Housler.
- On December 12, the Bears elevated Demontre Hurst to the active roster.
- On December 15, the Bears elevated John Timu to the active roster.
- On December 22, the Bears elevated D'Anthony Smith to the active roster.
- On December 30, the Bears signed Greg Scruggs and Terry Williams.

Departures

- On September 15, the Bears released David Fales.
- On September 19, the Bears released Demontre Hurst.
- On September 22, the Bears released Bryce Callahan.
- On September 25, the Bears released Lavar Edwards.
- On September 28, the Bears traded Jared Allen to the Carolina Panthers and Jon Bostic to the New England Patriots.
- On September 29, the Bears released Brock Vereen.
- On October 3, the Bears released Brandon Dunn.
- On October 6, the Bears released Spencer Lanning and John Timu.
- On October 13, the Bears released David Fales.
- On October 22, the Bears released Jeremiah Ratliff.
- On November 17, the Bears released Terrance Mitchell.
- On November 23, the Bears released Jimmy Clausen.
- On November 28, the Bears released Thomas Gafford.
- On December 15, the Bears released Ziggy Hood.
- On December 22, the Bears released Antone Smith.

Reserve lists

- On September 14, the Bears placed Cornelius Washington on the injured reserve list.
- On October 6, the Bears placed Will Montgomery and Jalen Saunders on the injured reserve and practice squad/injured list, respectively.
- On October 12, the Bears placed Jacquizz Rodgers on the injured reserve list.
- On October 17, the Bears placed Ego Ferguson on the injured reserve list.
- On November 10, the Bears placed Tayo Fabuluje on the reserve/suspended by commissioner list.
- On December 8, the Bears placed Martellus Bennett on the injured reserve list.
- On December 12, the Bears placed Marquess Wilson on the injured reserve list.
- On December 14, the Bears placed Antrel Rolle on the injured reserve list.
- On December 30, the Bears placed Eddie Goldman and Alshon Jeffery on the injured reserve list.

Practice squad additions

- On September 17, the Bears added David Fales to the practice squad.
- On September 21, the Bears added Paul Lasike to the practice squad.
- On September 22, the Bears added Demontre Hurst and Deonte Thompson to the practice squad.
- On September 24, the Bears added Bryce Callahan to the practice squad.
- On October 6, the Bears added Brandon Dunn and Barrett Jones to the practice squad.
- On October 7, the Bears added Ryan Seymour to the practice squad.
- On October 8, the Bears added John Timu to the practice squad.
- On October 13, the Bears added Nathan Palmer and D'Anthony Smith to the practice squad.
- On October 14, the Bears added David Fales to the practice squad.
- On October 21, the Bears added Demontre Hurst to the practice squad.
- On November 10, the Bears added Martin Wallace to the practice squad.
- On November 18, the Bears added Terrance Mitchell to the practice squad.
- On November 24, the Bears added Danny Mason and Justin Worley to the practice squad.
- On December 8, the Bears added Matt Blanchard to the practice squad.
- On December 15, the Bears added Toby Johnson and Marcus Lucas to the practice squad.
- On December 22, the Bears added De'Vante Bausby and Davon Coleman to the practice squad.

Practice squad departures

- On September 21, the Bears removed Bronson Hill from the practice squad.
- On September 22, the Bears removed Ify Umodu from the practice squad.
- On October 6, the Bears removed Terry Williams from the practice squad.
- On October 13, the Bears removed Ryan Seymour and Brandon Dunn from the practice squad.
- On November 23, the Bears removed Terrance Mitchell from the practice squad.
- On November 30, Barrett Jones was signed from the practice squad by the Philadelphia Eagles.
- On December 8, the Bears removed Justin Worley from the practice squad.
- On December 22, the Bears removed Toby Johnson from the practice squad.

=== Schedule ===
The regular season schedule was released on April 21. Aside from the standard six games against NFC North teams, the Bears also played the AFC West and NFC West teams, along with the two last-place finishing NFC East (Washington) and NFC South (Tampa Bay) teams. The Bears' opponents had a combined record of 136–120 (.531), making their schedule the 13th-strongest in the league.

Week	Date	Opponent	Result	Record	Game site	GameBook	NFL.com recap
1	September 13	**Green Bay Packers**	**L** 23–31	0–1	Soldier Field	GameBook	Recap
2	September 20	Arizona Cardinals	**L** 23–48	0–2	Soldier Field	GameBook	Recap
3	September 27	at Seattle Seahawks	**L** 0–26	0–3	CenturyLink Field	GameBook	Recap
4	October 4	Oakland Raiders	**W** 22–20	1–3	Soldier Field	GameBook	Recap
5	October 11	at Kansas City Chiefs	**W** 18–17	2–3	Arrowhead Stadium	GameBook	Recap
6	October 18	at **Detroit Lions**	**L** 34–37 (OT)	2–4	Ford Field	GameBook	Recap
7	Bye						
8	November 1	**Minnesota Vikings**	**L** 20–23	2–5	Soldier Field	GameBook	Recap
9	November 9	at San Diego Chargers	**W** 22–19	3–5	Qualcomm Stadium	GameBook	Recap
10	November 15	at St. Louis Rams	**W** 37–13	4–5	Edward Jones Dome	GameBook	Recap
11	November 22	Denver Broncos	**L** 15–17	4–6	Soldier Field	GameBook	Recap
12	November 26	at **Green Bay Packers**	**W** 17–13	5–6	Lambeau Field	GameBook	Recap
13	December 6	San Francisco 49ers	**L** 20–26 (OT)	5–7	Soldier Field	GameBook	Recap
14	December 13	Washington Redskins	**L** 21–24	5–8	Soldier Field	GameBook	Recap
15	December 20	at **Minnesota Vikings**	**L** 17–38	5–9	TCF Bank Stadium	GameBook	Recap
16	December 27	at Tampa Bay Buccaneers	**W** 26–21	6–9	Raymond James Stadium	GameBook	Recap
17	January 3	**Detroit Lions**	**L** 20–24	6–10	Soldier Field	GameBook	Recap
Note: Intra-division opponents are in **bold** text. Legend # Games played with color uniforms. # Games played with white uniforms. # Games played with 1940s throwback uniforms. – Light green background indicates a victory. – Light red background indicates a loss.

=== Game summaries ===
==== Week 1: vs. Green Bay Packers ====
Week One: Green Bay Packers at Chicago Bears – Game summary

Quarter	1	2	3	4	Total
**Packers**	7	3	7	14	**31**
Bears	3	10	3	7	**23**

at Soldier Field, Chicago, Illinois

- Date: September 13
- Game time: 12:00 p.m. CDT
- Game weather: 68 °F (20 °C), mostly sunny
- Game attendance: 62,442
- Referee: Craig Wrolstad
- TV announcers (Fox): Joe Buck, Troy Aikman and Erin Andrews
- Recap, Gamebook

Game information

**First quarter**

- CHI – Robbie Gould 28-yard field goal, 9:28 (CHI 3–0). **Drive: 11 plays, 70 yards, 5:32**
- GB – James Jones 13-yard pass from Aaron Rodgers, Mason Crosby XP good, 0:43 (GB 7–3). **Drive: 10 plays, 77 yards, 4:42**

**Second quarter**

- CHI – Matt Forte 1-yard run, Robbie Gould XP good, 7:49 (CHI 10–7). **Drive: 15 plays, 80 yards, 7:54**
- GB – Mason Crosby 37-yard field goal, 2:32 (TIE 10–10). **Drive: 10 plays, 61 yards, 5:17**
- CHI – Robbie Gould 50-yard field goal, 0:08 (CHI 13–10). **Drive: 12 plays, 47 yards, 2:24**

**Third quarter**

- GB – James Jones 1-yard pass from Aaron Rodgers, Mason Crosby XP good, 11:56 (GB 17–13). **Drive: 6 plays, 59 yards, 3:04**
- CHI – Robbie Gould 44-yard field goal, 4:57 (GB 17–16). **Drive: 12 plays, 56 yards, 6:59**

**Fourth quarter**

- GB – Randall Cobb 5-yard pass from Aaron Rodgers, Mason Crosby XP good, 10:26 (GB 24–16). **Drive: 16 plays, 78 yards, 9:31**
- GB – Eddie Lacy 2-yard run, Mason Crosby XP good, 1:55 (GB 31–16). **Drive: 4 plays, 48 yards, 1:46**
- CHI – Martellus Bennett 24-yard pass from Jay Cutler, Robbie Gould XP good, 0:34 (GB 31–23). **Drive: 6 plays, 72 yards, 1:21**

**Top passers**

- GB – Aaron Rodgers, 18/23, 189 yards, 3 TD
- CHI – Jay Cutler, 18/36, 225 yards, 1 TD, 1 INT

**Top rushers**

- GB – Eddie Lacy, 19 carries, 85 yards, 1 TD
- CHI – Matt Forte, 24 carries, 141 yards, 1 TD

**Top receivers**

- GB – Randall Cobb, 5 receptions, 38 yards, 1 TD
- CHI – Alshon Jeffery, 5 receptions, 78 yards

**Top tacklers**

- GB – Sam Shields, 6 tackles
- CHI – Shea McClellin, 4 tackles

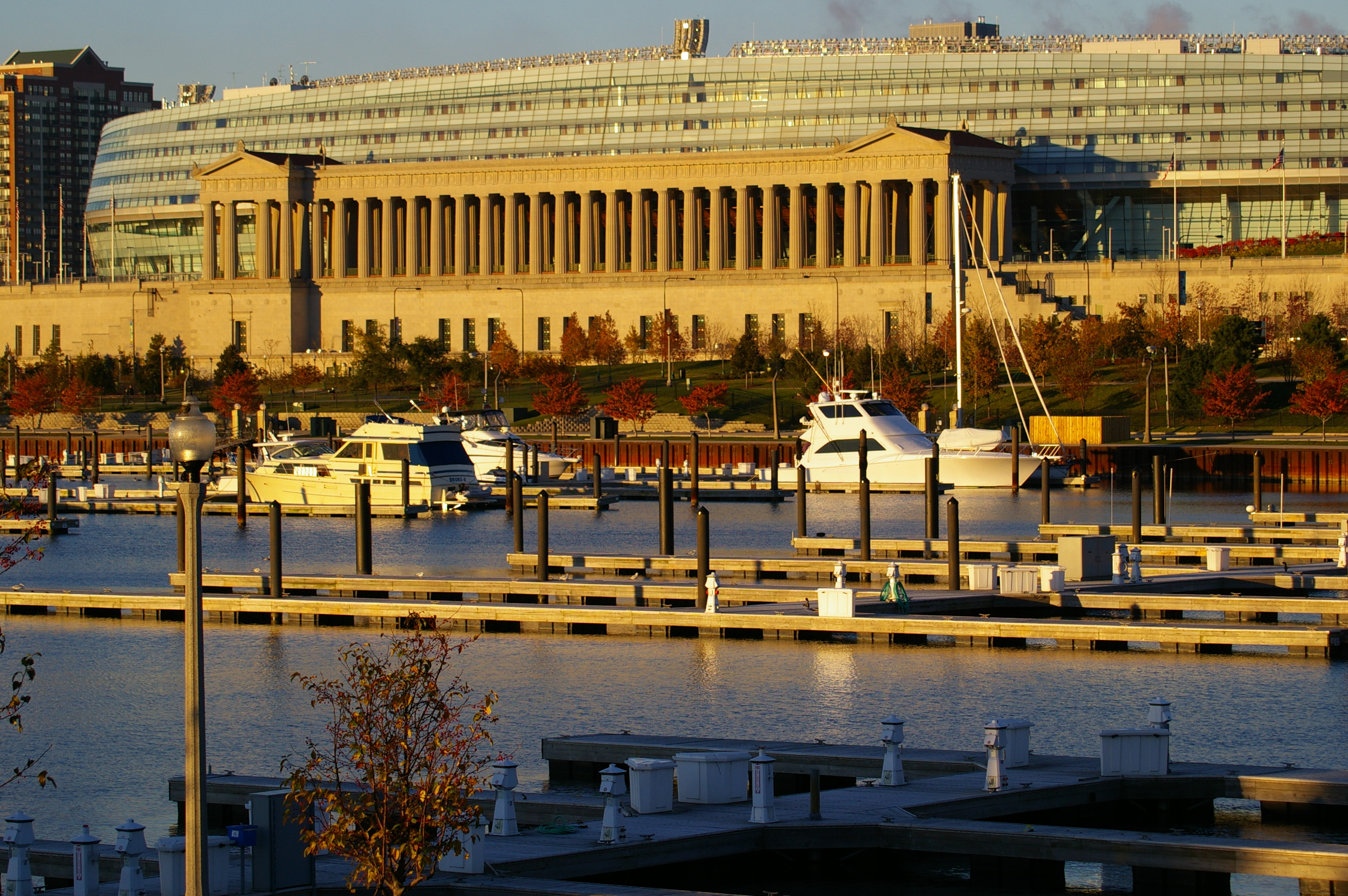
The Bears played all of their home games at Soldier Field

The Bears opened the season hosting rival Green Bay Packers, the 191st meeting in the two teams' history and the third season opener in which both teams played each other in Chicago; the Bears held a 93–91–6 all-time lead, and also led the series in season opener record with 17–12–2. However, the Packers had won nine of the last ten games between the two, including the last game, a 55–14 victory at Lambeau Field. WBBM-TV analyst Jeff Joniak believed the Bears would have to run to gain an advantage against the Packers; when Chicago played Green Bay in week four last season, the latter had the 30th-ranked run defense, and allowed 235 rushing yards in that game. Additionally, the offense had to avoid drives that required long yardage, as the Bears had scored 74 points outside of the red zone (the 29th-best in the league), while also protecting quarterback Jay Cutler from linebackers Julius Peppers and Clay Matthews III. On defense, the new 3–4 defense faced a fast-paced Green Bay offense featuring quarterback Aaron Rodgers and tailback Eddie Lacy. The Rodgers-led Packers, who led the NFC North in touchdowns with 58, along with having the highest average yards per play (6.17) in the NFL in 2014, also provided a challenge for the Bears defensive backs; blitzing Rodgers was also a liability, as he had a league-best 130.4 rating with 15 touchdowns and one interception against the blitz. However, the Packers did not have receiver Jordy Nelson, who had caught 13 touchdowns in 2014, as he had suffered an ACL tear during the preseason. quarterback David Fales, cornerback Tracy Porter, runningback Ka'Deem Carey, linebacker Jon Bostic, center Hroniss Grasu, tackle Tayo Fabuluje and receiver Cameron Meredith were inactive for the game.

The Packers won the coin toss, and elected to defer, meaning the Bears started the game with the ball. On the first possession of the game, the Bears offense reached as far as the Packers' eight-yard line, but ended with Robbie Gould kicking a 28-yard field goal. After the Packers punted, the Bears came close to allowing a turnover when Cutler was sacked by Peppers and fumbled, though the call was reversed. The next four drives of the game ended in scores for both teams: the Packers scored with Rodgers' 13-yard touchdown pass to James Jones, followed by the Bears reclaiming the lead in the second quarter with Matt Forte's one-yard touchdown run; the next two possessions concluded with field goals: Mason Crosby tied the game with a 37-yarder, though the Bears ended the first half with the 13–10 lead with Gould's 50-yarder. Prior to Forte's touchdown run, Gould had kicked a 27-yard field goal, but Sam Shields was offsides on the play, giving the Bears a 4th and 1, which the Bears capitalized with via Forte's one-yard run. The Bears then had two potential touchdowns nullified by Forte dropping a pass, and receiver Alshon Jeffery's touchdown was canceled by tackle Jermon Bushrod's holding penalty. The Packers also had a potential touchdown hurt by a penalty, as Rodgers had an eight-yard touchdown pass to Jones voided by holding penalties. In the second half, the Packers scored quickly with Jones' one-yard touchdown catch. The Bears responded with Gould's 44-yard field goal, but the Packers eventually scored again via Randall Cobb's five-yard touchdown catch. On Chicago's following drive, the offense drove to Green Bay's six-yard line to set up a first and goal situation. While Forte's four-yard run brought the Bears to the two, Cutler's passes to Eddie Royal, Jeffery and Royal again fell incomplete, leading to the Bears turning the ball over on downs. The Packers punted again, but the Bears failed to score when Cutler was intercepted by Matthews; the turnover set up Lacy's two-yard touchdown run to increase the score to 31–16 with 1:55 left in the game. With 34 seconds left, the Bears scored with Cutler's 24-yard touchdown pass to tight end Martellus Bennett, narrowing the margin to eight points. However, Green Bay's Davante Adams recovered the onside kick, and the Packers ran out the clock to end the game.

Gould's first field goal of the game allowed him to set the franchise record for the most field goals with 244, breaking a tie with Kevin Butler. Forte recorded 184 rushing yards in the game, the most by a Bears running back in a loss since Walter Payton's 175 yards in a 1984 loss to the Packers.

==== Week 2: vs. Arizona Cardinals ====
Week Two: Arizona Cardinals at Chicago Bears – Game summary

Quarter	1	2	3	4	Total
**Cardinals**	14	14	14	6	**48**
Bears	7	13	3	0	**23**

at Soldier Field, Chicago, Illinois

- Date: September 20
- Game time: 12:00 pm. CDT
- Game weather: 70 °F (21 °C), mostly sunny
- Game attendance: 62,351
- Referee: Jerome Boger
- TV announcers (Fox): Thom Brennaman, Charles Davis and Tony Siragusa
- Recap, Gamebook

Game information

**First quarter**

- ARI – David Johnson 108-yard kickoff return, Chandler Catanzaro XP good, 14:47 (ARI 7–0)
- CHI – Josh Bellamy 48-yard pass from Jay Cutler, Robbie Gould XP good, 3:20 (TIE 7–7). **Drive: 6 plays, 89 yards, 3:02**
- ARI – Jaron Brown 6-yard pass from Carson Palmer, Chandler Catanzaro XP good, 1:13 (ARI 14–7). **Drive: 6 plays, 65 yards, 2:07**

**Second quarter**

- CHI – Jeremy Langford 1-yard run, Robbie Gould XP good, 10:02 (TIE 14–14). **Drive: 11 plays, 80 yards, 6:11**
- ARI – Larry Fitzgerald 8-yard pass from Carson Palmer, Chandler Catanzaro XP good, 3:51 (ARI 21–14). **Drive: 9 plays, 80 yards, 6:11**
- ARI – Tony Jefferson 26-yard interception return, Chandler Catanzaro XP good, 2:59 (ARI 28–14).
- CHI – Robbie Gould 40-yard field goal, 0:59 (ARI 28–17). **Drive: 4 plays, 0:16**
- CHI – Robbie Gould 23-yard field goal, 0:00 (ARI 28–20). **Drive: 4 plays, 7 yards, 0:54**

**Third quarter**

- ARI – Larry Fitzgerald 28-yard pass from Carson Palmer, Chandler Catanzaro XP good, 12:41 (ARI 35–20). **Drive: 2 plays, 32 yards, 0:52**
- ARI – David Johnson 13-yard run, Chandler Catanzaro XP good, 6:06 (ARI 42–20). **Drive: 8 plays, 75 yards, 4:23**
- CHI – Robbie Gould 51-yard field goal, 2:26 (ARI 42–23). **Drive: 7 plays, 47 yards, 3:40**

**Fourth quarter**

- ARI – Larry Fitzgerald 9-yard pass from Carson Palmer, XP failed, 2:42 (ARI 48–23). **Drive: 9 plays, 46 yards, 5:04**

**Top passers**

- ARI – Carson Palmer, 17/24, 185 yards, 4 TD, 1 INT
- CHI – Jimmy Clausen, 14/23, 121 yards, 1 INT

**Top rushers**

- ARI – Chris Johnson, 20 carries, 72 yards
- CHI – Matt Forte, 15 carries, 61 yards

**Top receivers**

- ARI – Larry Fitzgerald, 8 receptions, 112 yards, 3 TD
- CHI – Eddie Royal, 7 receptions, 41 yards

**Top tacklers**

- ARI – Tony Jefferson, 9 tackles
- CHI – Shea McClellin, 4 tackles

Chicago hosted Arizona in week two, the 92nd meeting all-time; the Bears, who possessed a 58–27–6 record against the Cardinals entering the game, won the most recent meeting in 2012 28–13, though Arizona won the last game at Soldier Field in 2009 41–21. The Bears faced a 3–4 defense for the second consecutive week, and the Cardinals had a blitz-heavy defense. To attack it, Jeff Joniak wrote Matt Forte would have to be utilized. When passing, the Bears had to be wary of left-side cornerback Patrick Peterson; in 2014, Arizona's opponents only threw passes of at least ten yards to that side 29 times, the fifth-lowest in the NFL. As a result, teams attempted to throw to the right, with 51 deep passes, though only 29.4 percent were completed, the sixth-lowest in the league. Defensively, the Bears had to provide pressure to Carson Palmer, who had excelled in the season opener against the Saints with a three-touchdown game, against a line that allowed no sacks in week one, while also focusing on challenging the speed of the Arizona receivers. lineman Ego Ferguson, Ka'Deem Carey, Hroniss Grasu, Jon Bostic, Tayo Fabuluje were inactive for the game.

The Cardinals won the toss and decided to receive. On the opening kickoff, David Johnson returned it 108 yards for a touchdown. After both teams exchanged punts, receiver Josh Bellamy caught a 48-yard touchdown pass from Cutler, his first career touchdown reception. On the Cardinals' ensuing drive, the Bears forced fourth down after Palmer's pass to Johnson went out of bounds, but was reversed after it was determined he had a knee and elbow inbounds. Two plays later, Arizona gained 42 yards on Palmer's pass to John Brown, added with a defensive pass interference penalty on corner Kyle Fuller, placing the offense at the Bears' 11-yard line. After two plays, Palmer threw a six-yard touchdown pass to Jaron Brown. On Chicago's next drive, runningback Jeremy Langford scored on a one-yard dive. However, the Cardinals scored two touchdowns in 52 seconds: after Larry Fitzgerald's eight-yard touchdown reception, Tony Jefferson intercepted Cutler, scoring on the 26-yard return. Cutler tried to dive to tackle Jefferson, but landed on his right shoulder and suffered a hamstring injury; Jimmy Clausen replaced Cutler for the rest of the game. Despite losing Cutler, the Bears were able to score three points with Robbie Gould's 40-yard field goal, and got the ball back on the next drive with linebacker Jared Allen intercepting Palmer's pass intended for J. J. Nelson on the first play; however, the Bears had to settle for Gould's 23-yard field goal. In the third quarter, Clausen's pass for Marquess Wilson was intercepted by Patrick Peterson, with the Cardinals capitalizing on the turnover with Palmer's 28-yard touchdown pass to Fitzgerald. After the Bears punted, Arizona increased the score with Johnson's 13-yard touchdown run. Gould eventually kicked a 51-yard field goal to make the score 42–23, but Fitzgerald caught another touchdown pass, this time of nine yards, to widen the margin by 25 points, though Chandler Catanzaro's extra point was wide left.

The Bears fell to 0–2 for the first time since 2003, while the 48 points allowed were the most at home in team history.

==== Week 3: at Seattle Seahawks ====
Week Three: Chicago Bears at Seattle Seahawks – Game summary

Quarter	1	2	3	4	Total
Bears	0	0	0	0	**0**
**Seahawks**	3	3	14	6	**26**

at CenturyLink Field, Seattle, Washington

- Date: September 27
- Game time: 3:25 pm. CDT/1:25 p.m. PDT
- Game weather: 60 °F (16 °C), sunny
- Game attendance: 69,002
- Referee: Carl Cheffers
- TV announcers (CBS): Jim Nantz, Phil Simms and Tracy Wolfson
- Recap, Gamebook

Game information

**First quarter**

- SEA – Steven Hauschka 31-yard field goal, 5:16 (SEA 3–0). **Drive: 4 plays, 6 yards, 1:29**

**Second quarter**

- SEA – Steven Hauschka 21-yard field goal, 0:00 (SEA 6–0). **Drive: 12 plays, 77 yards, 2:37**

**Third quarter**

- SEA – Tyler Lockett 105-yard kickoff return, Steven Hauschka XP good, 14:48 (SEA 13–0).
- SEA – Jimmy Graham 30-yard pass from Russell Wilson, Steven Hauschka XP good, 4:28 (SEA 20–0). **Drive: 7 plays, 85 yards, 3:53**

**Fourth quarter**

- SEA – Steven Hauschka 45-yard field goal, 14:03 (SEA 23–0). **Drive: 8 plays, 62 yards, 3:24**
- SEA – Steven Hauschka 48-yard field goal, 6:16 (SEA 26–0). **Drive: 12 plays, 50 yards, 6:09**

**Top passers**

- CHI – Jimmy Clausen, 9/17, 63 yards
- SEA – Russell Wilson, 20/30, 235 yards, 1 TD

**Top rushers**

- CHI – Matt Forte, 20 carries, 74 yards
- SEA – Thomas Rawls, 16 carries, 104 yards

**Top receivers**

- CHI – Martellus Bennett, 4 receptions, 15 yards
- SEA – Jimmy Graham, 7 receptions, 83 yards, 1 TD

**Top tacklers**

- CHI – Antrel Rolle, 7 tackles
- SEA – K. J. Wright, 5 tackles

The Bears' first away game of the season occurred in Seattle, who led the all-time series 10–6, including the last three regular season games. However, the Bears had won the last game in Seattle in 2009 25–19. The Bears offense, not featuring Jay Cutler nor Alshon Jeffery, faced a defense led by Kam Chancellor, who returned to the Seahawks after a holdout. Without Chancellor for the first two games of the season, the defense had allowed quarterbacks to complete 72 percent of their passes with a passer rating of 116.4. Jeff Joniak believed that to counter the Legion of Boom, the Bears had to balance the rushing and passing attacks, while watching for a blitz that pressured Aaron Rodgers 19 times in week two. On defense, the Bears had to watch for quarterback Russell Wilson, though he had struggled with pressure in the first two games, being sacked a total of eight times. Additionally, the run defense had to be aware of a running game led by Marshawn Lynch; the corps had averaged 121.5 yards per game. On special teams, the Bears had to stop speedy rookie receiver Tyler Lockett, who had scored on a punt return earlier in the season.

The Seahawks won the coin toss and kicked off. Before the Bears' first offensive play, they were penalized for delay of game, and eventually punted. After both teams each traded punts once, Seattle's Richard Sherman utilized a trick punt return, similar to one the Bears had utilized with Devin Hester and Johnny Knox in the past, to record a 64-yard return to the Bears' 19-yard line. Seattle eventually scored first with Steven Hauschka's 31-yard field goal. Five drives (all of which ended in punts for both teams) later, the Seahawks ended the first half with Hauschka's 21-yarder. Prior to the Seahawks' last drive, controversy over the Bears' last punt arose: after Pat O'Donnell punted, the ball started to bounce out of bounds, but it hit Seahawks linebacker Brock Coyle in the leg, making it available to recover, with defensive back Sherrick McManis taking advantage. However, the officials ruled the punt as downed by McManis, which led to John Fox challenging the call, though it stood. The Bears special teams struggles continued in the second half, when Lockett returned the opening kickoff 105 yards for the touchdown. The Seahawks increased the score with another touchdown later in the third quarter via Jimmy Graham's 30-yard touchdown catch from Wilson, followed by 45- and 48-yard field goals by Hauschka in the fourth quarter to make the final score 26–0.

The Bears were shut out for the first time in 194 games (a 15–0 loss to the Tampa Bay Buccaneers in week 17, 2002), which was then the sixth-longest streak in the league. After three games, the Bears had allowed 105 total points, the most since the 2003 season, when they allowed 111. Additionally, the Bears punted on all ten drives in the game, the first time since the data was first compiled in 1980. Despite the hardships, the defense improved, allowing only one touchdown after allowing five against the Cardinals; additionally, having the game as one of two teams without a sack, the Bears recorded four against Seattle, two each by defensive end Jarvis Jenkins and linebacker Pernell McPhee.

==== Week 4 vs. Raiders ====
Week Four: Oakland Raiders (2–1) at Chicago Bears (0–3)

Quarter	1	2	3	4	Total
Raiders	0	14	3	3	**20**
**Bears**	6	10	0	6	**22**

at Soldier Field • Chicago, Illinois

- Date: October 4
- Game time: 12:00 pm. CDT
- Game weather: Cloudy • 55 °F (13 °C) • Wind NE 12 miles per hour (19 km/h; 10 kn)
- Game attendance: 62,409
- Referee: Jeff Triplette
- TV announcers (CBS): Greg Gumbel, Trent Green, and Jamie Erdahl
- Gamebook

Game information

Raiders

- Derek Carr
  20/33, 196 Yds, 2 TD, INT
- Latavius Murray
  15 Rush, 49 Yds
- Michael Crabtree
  5 Rec, 80 Yds

Bears

- Jay Cutler
  28/43, 281 Yds, 2 TD, INT
- Matt Forte
  25 Rush, 91 Yds
- Martellus Bennett
  11 Rec, 83 Yds, TD

Returning to Soldier Field for week four, the Bears hosted the Oakland Raiders, who held a 7–6 all-time lead entering the game. This was the first game between the two at Soldier Field since 2003, where the Bears won 24–21, and the first since 2011, when the Raiders won 25–20 in Oakland. The Bears offense faced a defense led by defensive end Khalil Mack, while the secondary is guided by 39-year-old Charles Woodson, who possessed 61 career interceptions, and had sealed the Raiders' win the previous week against the Browns. However, the Raiders had struggled against tight ends, allowing five catches of at least 25 yards, with a total of 20 catches for 298 yards and five touchdowns across the first three games. On defense, Chicago was against quarterback Derek Carr, who led the Raiders offense to 74 combined points in the last two games, along with rookie receiver Amari Cooper, who had 20 receptions entering the game, while also recording a 68-yard touchdown in week two. Jeff Joniak wrote that the Bears had to prevent the Raiders from gaining yardage after touching the ball; the Raiders were seventh in yards after the catch, while Latavius Murray – who had recorded 139 rushing yards in week three, was ranked fourth in the league in rushing yards and was leading the AFC in yards per carry with 4.8 – ranked fifth in yards after contact. Cooper had 177 yards after the catch, the second-most in the league among wide receivers, while 53.7 percent of Carr's passing yards occurred due to these plays. In comparison, the Bears allowed the fewest yards after contact. David Fales, punter Patrick O’Donnell, Alshon Jeffery, Ka’Deem Carey, Hroniss Grasu, tackle Jermon Bushrod and nose tackle Jeremiah Ratliff were inactive.

The Raiders won the coin toss and deferred in the second half. The Bears managed to record an 80-yard drive to score on the opening possession via Jay Cutler's seven-yard touchdown pass to Eddie Royal. During the drive, lineman Charles Leno landed on center Will Montgomery's leg, injuring the latter and prompting Matt Slauson to replace him. Robbie Gould's extra point was blocked, and his struggles continued with the following kickoff when his squib kick bounced out of bounds. After the game's four next drives culminated with punts, the Raiders scored on Carr's 26-yard touchdown pass to Cooper; despite initially being ruled out of bounds, the Raiders challenged the call and the ruling was overturned. On the Bears' next series, Slauson botched the snap to Cutler, and the Raiders' Dan Williams recovered. Oakland capitalized on the takeaway with Roy Helu scoring on a four-yard touchdown reception, though the Bears responded with Cutler taking advantage of an open Martellus Bennett to score on a five-yard touchdown. On Oakland's next drive, Carr's swing pass to Murray was deflected and landed towards Pernell McPhee, intercepting the pass; Gould eventually kicked a 19-yard field goal. In the second half, the Raiders punted on the first drive, though they reclaimed the ball after Stacy McGee recovered Matt Forte's fumble. Oakland eventually took the lead with Sebastian Janikowski's 29-yard field goal. Gould eventually gave the Bears the lead back with Gould's 54-yard kick, and reclaimed possession of the ball with Murray dropping a pitch and Sam Acho recovered. However, the Bears gave the ball back when Cutler's pass for Bennett fell short and was intercepted by Woodson, leading to Janikowski's 41-yard field goal.

With 2:05 left in the game, Cutler began leading a two-minute drill: after a six-yard run by Forte, followed by a sack by Mack and incomplete pass to Josh Bellamy to bring up fourth down, Cutler successfully converted with a seven-yard pass to Bennett, who beat Keenan Lambert. Cutler's next pass to Marquess Wilson fell incomplete, and Forte's seven-yard run led to another third-down situation, which led to Cutler's first-down conversion of seven yards to Wilson with 56 seconds left. On the next set of downs, Cutler's pass for receiver Cameron Meredith was overthrown, though a 12-yard pass to Royal allowed the offense to enter Oakland territory, where the Bears elected to use a timeout with 40 seconds remaining. The offense entered field goal range with Cutler's nine-yard pass to Wilson, followed by a two-yard run by Forte. With seven seconds left, the Bears used another timeout, and allowed Gould to attempt the 49-yard field goal; Gould successfully converted the field goal with two seconds remaining on the clock to give the Bears the 22–20 lead. In a last-second attempt to score, the Raiders attempted lateral passes on the kickoff return, but were penalized for an illegal lateral in the early stages of the play, and the Bears eventually recovered to clinch the win.

Gould was later named the NFC Special Teams Player of the Week, his third ST POTW honor and tying him with kickers Jeff Jaeger and Paul Edinger for the most in team history. The field goal was Gould's eleventh career game-winner. Forte ran for 91 yards in the game to increase his career rushing yards total to 8,071, becoming the 14th player in NFL history to record 8,000 and 3,500 career rushing and receiving yards, respectively, while becoming the second-fastest player to achieve the milestone with 111 games. The win would be the only home win for the Bears all season, finishing the year with a horrific 1–7 home record. The Bears would finish 3–13 at home in both 2014 and 2015 combined.

Scoring summary

Quarter	Time	Drive			Team	Scoring information	Score	
Quarter	Time	Plays	Yards	TOP	Team	Scoring information	OAK	CHI
1	10:57	8	80	4:03	Bears	Eddie Royal 7-yard touchdown reception from Jay Cutler, Robbie Gould kick no good (blocked)	0	6
2	11:10	7	51	3:38	Raiders	Amari Cooper 26-yard touchdown reception from Derek Carr, Sebastian Janikowski kick good	7	6
2	7:12	3	25	1:05	Raiders	Roy Helu 4-yard touchdown reception from Derek Carr, Sebastian Janikowski kick good	14	6
2	3:30	7	80	3:42	Bears	Martellus Bennett 5-yard touchdown reception from Jay Cutler, Robbie Gould kick good	14	13
2	1:26	6	14	1:52	Bears	19-yard field goal by Robbie Gould	14	16
3	10:53	7	35	2:28	Raiders	29-yard field goal by Sebastian Janikowski	17	16
4	13:01	10	54	5:01	Bears	54-yard field goal by Robbie Gould	17	19
4	2:05	11	68	4:36	Raiders	41-yard field goal by Sebastian Janikowski	20	19
4	0:02	12	48	2:03	Bears	49-yard field goal by Robbie Gould	20	22
"TOP" = time of possession. For other American football terms, see Glossary of American football.							20	22

==== Week 5: at Kansas City Chiefs ====
Week Five: Chicago Bears at Kansas City Chiefs – Game summary

Quarter	1	2	3	4	Total
**Bears**	3	0	3	12	**18**
Chiefs	7	10	0	0	**17**

at Arrowhead Stadium, Kansas City, Missouri

- Date: October 11
- Game time: 12:00 pm. CDT
- Game weather: 72 °F (22 °C), sunny
- Game attendance: 75,799
- Referee: Tony Corrente
- TV announcers (Fox): Sam Rosen, John Lynch and Pam Oliver
- Recap, Gamebook

Game information

**First quarter**

- KC – Ramik Wilson fumble recovery, Cairo Santos XP good, 8:13 (KC 7–0).
- CHI – Robbie Gould 44-yard field goal, 0:53 (KC 7–3). **Drive: 14 plays, 54 yards, 7:20**

**Second quarter**

- KC – De'Anthony Thomas 19-yard pass from Alex Smith, Cairo Santos XP good, 9:57 (KC 14–3). **Drive: 7 plays, 54 yards, 3:28**
- KC – Cairo Santos 35-yard field goal, 0:09 (KC 17–3). **Drive: 11 plays, 57 yards, 3:00**

**Third quarter**

- CHI – Robbie Gould 30-yard field goal, 3:29 (KC 17–6). **Drive: 11 plays, 73 yards, 5:13**

**Fourth quarter**

- CHI – Marquess Wilson 22-yard pass from Jay Cutler, conversion failed, 3:05 (KC 17–12). **Drive: 11 plays, 88 yards, 4:46**
- CHI – Matt Forte 7-yard pass from Jay Cutler, conversion failed, 0:18 (CHI 18–17). **Drive: 8 plays, 67 yards, 1:46**

**Top passers**

- CHI – Jay Cutler, 26/45, 252 yards, 2 TD
- KC – Alex Smith, 16/30, 181 yards, 1 TD

**Top rushers**

- CHI – Matt Forte, 18 carries, 71 yards
- KC – Jamaal Charles, 12 carries, 58 yards

**Top receivers**

- CHI – Marquess Wilson, 6 receptions, 85 yards, 1 TD
- KC – Jeremy Maclin, 8 receptions, 85 yards

**Top tacklers**

- CHI – Christian Jones, 4 tackles
- KC – Marcus Peters, 8 tackles

For the fifth game of the season, the Bears visited Kansas City, who trailed the Bears 5–6 in the all-time series; the game was the first in Kansas City since 2003, which the Chiefs won 31–3. Entering the game, the Bears were plagued by injuries, with 16 players listed on the injury report: Jermon Bushrod (concussion) was ruled out, safety Antrel Rolle (ankle) was doubtful, and 13 others were questionable. Jeff Joniak wrote that the offense had to be cautious of Bob Sutton's 3–4 defense, particularly the front five guided by linebacking duo Tamba Hali and Justin Houston. However, the pass rush only had nine sacks in 2015. To combat the defense, the Chiefs' cornerbacks had to be targeted, particularly Jamell Fleming and rookie Marcus Peters, who was targeted the most among cornerbacks in the NFL and four touchdowns, respectively. Additionally, the Chiefs had allowed 15 touchdowns, the most in the NFL, and in the red zone, was ranked the worst in the league. Also, the Chiefs pass defense allowed eleven passing touchdowns and 295.5 passing yards per game (ranked 28th in the league), while recording only two interceptions. The Bears defense, which had recorded six sacks in the last two games, faced an offensive line that allowed a league-high 19 sacks. Despite the struggles on the OL, Chiefs quarterback Alex Smith had receivers like Jeremy Maclin, who had recorded 148 receiving yards in the previous game, though Smith had a 49.5 completion percentage to receivers, one of the worst in the league. In the rushing attack, the Chiefs had running back Jamaal Charles, who was tied with Matt Forte for the most rushes of ten yards or more in the NFL with eleven; however, Charles had fumbled 26 times in his career, including twice in 2015. On special teams, facing former Bears ST coordinator Dave Toub, the Kansas City return unit was led by Knile Davis (kickoffs) and De'Anthony Thomas (punts); Davis ranked fourth in the NFL in KR yards, while Thomas was tied for seventh in PR yards. The Bears' coverage unit took on Pro Bowl punter Dustin Colquitt, who was ranked fourth in gross punt average and third in net average, while allowing only 51 yards on the return, along with kicker Cairo Santos led the league in field goals. Bushrod, Rolle, Alshon Jeffery, Eddie Royal, David Fales, guard Patrick Omameh and defensive end Will Sutton were inactive.

The Chiefs won the toss and deferred until the second half. After the Bears and Chiefs' first drives ended with punts, the Bears' next possession started at their own nine-yard line after an 18-yard punt return by Marc Mariani was nullified by Jeremy Langford's holding penalty. Three plays into the drive, Chiefs Jaye Howard and Allen Bailey sacked Jay Cutler in the endzone, leading to a fumble that was recovered by Ramik Wilson and gave the Chiefs the touchdown. After getting the ball back, the Bears were able to score three points late in the first quarter with Robbie Gould's 44-yard field goal. The Chiefs eventually punted again, and the Bears were again pinned inside their own five-yard line; the drive stalled, and Pat O'Donnell punted from the endzone. Despite playing a team with offensive line struggles, the Bears failed to employ a pass rush during the Chiefs' next drive, and once they did on third down, Smith threw a pass to Thomas, who scored on the 19-yard play. Kansas City increased the margin to 17–3 with nine seconds left in the second quarter, with Santos' 35-yard field goal; Cutler kneeled to end the first half. On the Chiefs' first drive of the second half, the offense reached the Bears' nine-yard line, but Santos' field goal was blocked by Pernell McPhee, allowing the Bears to take over at their own 17. The first play of the Bears' drive was a ten-yard run by Forte for a first down, marking the Bears' first since the opening quarter, and the series concluded with Gould's 30-yard field goal. The next four drives of the game ended with punts, while one of the series, held by the Bears, concluded with a turnover on downs.

With 7:51 left in the game and down 17–6, Cutler attempted to lead another comeback for the second consecutive game. The first drive lasted eleven plays and 88 yards, concluding with Cutler throwing a 22-yard touchdown pass to Marquess Wilson in the corner of the left endzone. The Bears attempted to go for two, but Cutler's pass for Mariani was ruled out; after a challenge, the ruling was upheld. The Chiefs eventually punted again, with the Bears starting their next drive on their own 33. Cutler led the offense on an eight-play, 67-yard drive, concluding with a seven-yard touchdown pass to Forte despite dropping the snap. However, the Bears failed the two-point conversion. The Chiefs started their final drive on their own 33 with eleven seconds left in the game. Smith reached the Bears' 48 with a pass to Maclin, and on the next play, threw a nine-yard pass to Maclin. However, Maclin juggled the pass while going out of bounds. As a result, with two seconds left, the Chiefs elected to try an NFL record 66-yard field goal. However, Santos' kick fell short, giving the Bears the 18–17 win.

This was Chicago's first victory at Arrowhead since 1993 where the Bears won 19–17. Two team records were set during the game. After converting his second field goal of the game, Gould became the leader of the most points in franchise history with 1,168 points, surpassing Kevin Butler. The win was Cutler's 46th with the Bears, tying Jim McMahon for the most in team history.

==== Week 6: at Detroit Lions ====
Week Six: Chicago Bears at Detroit Lions – Game summary

Quarter	1	2	3	4	OT	Total
Bears	3	10	3	18	0	**34**
**Lions**	7	14	3	10	3	**37**

at Ford Field, Detroit, Michigan

- Date: October 18
- Game time: 1:00 p.m. EDT/12:00 pm. CDT
- Game weather: Played indoors (dome stadium)
- Game attendance: 57,648
- Referee: Walt Coleman
- TV announcers (Fox): Chris Myers, Ronde Barber and Jennifer Hale
- Recap, Gamebook

Game information

**First quarter**

- DET – Lance Moore 20-yard pass from Matthew Stafford, Matt Prater XP good, 9:29 (DET 7–0). **Drive: 10 plays, 80 yards, 5:31**
- CHI – Robbie Gould 27-yard field goal, 4:48 (DET 7–3). **Drive: 10 plays, 71 yards, 4:41**

**Second quarter**

- CHI – Jeremy Langford 1-yard run, Robbie Gould XP good, 12:48 (CHI 10–7). **Drive: 10 plays, 67 yards, 4:51**
- DET – Tim Wright 8-yard pass from Matthew Stafford, Matt Prater XP good, 9:17 (DET 14–10). **Drive: 6 plays, 79 yards, 3:31**
- CHI – Robbie Gould 23-yard field goal, 4:50 (DET 14–13). **Drive: 10 plays, 72 yards, 4:27**
- DET – Golden Tate 2-yard pass from Matthew Stafford, Matt Prater XP good, 0:53 (DET 21–13). **Drive: 12 plays, 85 yards, 3:57**

**Third quarter**

- CHI – Robbie Gould 38-yard field goal, 5:12 (DET 21–16). **Drive: 4 plays, 1 yard, 1:30**
- DET – Matt Prater 39-yard field goal, 1:05 (DET 24–16). **Drive: 6 plays, 59 yards, 4:07**

**Fourth quarter**

- CHI – Alshon Jeffery 11-yard pass from Jay Cutler, Robbie Gould XP good, 12:27 (DET 24–23). **Drive: 3 plays, 21 yards, 1:31**
- CHI – Matt Forte 2-yard run, conversion good, 7:50 (CHI 31–24). **Drive: 7 plays, 24 yards, 3:09**
- DET – Matt Prater 32-yard field goal, 2:46 (CHI 31–27). **Drive: 13 plays, 67 yards, 5:04**
- DET – Calvin Johnson 6-yard pass from Matthew Stafford, Matt Prater XP good, 0:21 (DET 34–31). **Drive: 5 plays, 66 yards, 2:02**
- CHI – Robbie Gould 29-yard field goal, 0:00 (TIE 34–34). **Drive: 3 plays, 69 yards, 0:21**

**Overtime**

- DET – Matt Prater 27-yard field goal, 2:29 (DET 37–34). **Drive: 8 plays, 77 yards, 3:54**

**Top passers**

- CHI – Jay Cutler, 26/41, 353 yards, 1 TD, 1 INT
- DET – Matthew Stafford, 27/42, 405 yards, 4 TD, 1 INT

**Top rushers**

- CHI – Matt Forte, 24 carries, 69 yards, 1 TD
- DET – Ameer Abdullah, 14 carries, 48 yards

**Top receivers**

- CHI – Alshon Jeffery, 8 receptions, 147 yards, 1 TD
- DET – Calvin Johnson, 6 receptions, 166 yards, 1 TD

**Top tacklers**

- CHI – Christian Jones, 6 tackles
- DET – Stephen Tulloch, 9 tackles

The second NFC North game of the season took place in Detroit, when the Bears played the winless Lions. Although the Bears led the all-time series 96–69–5, the Lions had won the last four meetings. The Bears' offensive players had success against Detroit in the past: in 12 career games against the Lions, Jay Cutler threw for 2,669 yards, 17 touchdowns, seven interceptions and an 89.9 passer rating, while Matt Forte (in 14 games) had 1,066 rushing yards, six rushing touchdowns and four touchdown receptions, his most against any opponent. A potential weakness that Forte and the Bears rushing attack could exploit was the Lions' run defense; with the departures of defensive linemen Ndamukong Suh and Nick Fairley, the run defense, which had allowed a league-low 69.3 rushing yards per game in 2014, regressed in 2015, allowing 126.6 yards per game (ranked 27th in the league). The Lions pass defense also suffered during the season: the Lions allowed quarterbacks to complete 78 percent of passes and a league-high combined 128.7 passer rating, while also allowing the second-most plays of 20 yards or more, with 25. To take advantage of this, the Bears saw the returns of Alshon Jeffery, Eddie Royal and Martellus Bennett from injuries. As for the Bears defense, they faced an offense that recorded 4.9 yards per play, ranked 29th in the NFL. Lions quarterback Matthew Stafford had also struggled, having an average of 6.2 yards per pass, the worst in his six-year career, and had been benched in the Lions' week five game against Arizona. Detroit running backs also struggled, averaging only 2.8 yards per carry. As a whole, the Lions offense led the league in turnovers with 15. On special teams, the Lions led the league in kickoff returns of at least 20 yards, with running back Ameer Abdullah leading the NFL in the same category with nine. Terrence Mitchell, Antrel Rolle, runningback Antone Smith, linebacker Shea McClellin, tackle Nick Becton, Jermon Bushrod and nose tackle Bruce Gaston were inactive.

The Bears won the toss and deferred. The Lions' opening drive concluded with a touchdown when Lance Moore beat Sherrick McManis to score on a 20-yard touchdown. Chicago retaliated with ten unanswered points via Robbie Gould's 27-yard field goal and Jeremy Langford's one-yard touchdown run, the latter occurring in the second quarter. The Lions reclaimed the lead with Stafford's eight-yard touchdown pass to Tim Wright, though the Bears managed to score three points with Gould's 23-yard kick. Late in the first half, the Lions reached the Bears' two-yard line, where Stafford threw a pass to Golden Tate; as he crossed the goal line, he was stripped by Kyle Fuller, with the pass being intercepted by Jonathan Anderson and ruled a touchback. However, referee Walt Coleman ruled the play as a touchdown, stating that Tate "took three steps and broke the plane." On Chicago's first drive of the second half, the offense, aided by Cutler's 46-yard pass to Marquess Wilson, reached the Detroit five, but Cutler's pass for Jeffery in the endzone was intercepted by Rashean Mathis. The Bears nearly regained the ball on the Lions' ensuing possession when Sam Acho stripped Abdullah, but Abdullah managed to recover. Eventually, the Lions punted, and when the Bears also punted on the next possession, T. J. Jones muffed it, and Josh Bellamy recovered. Gould later kicked a 38-yard field goal. On the Lions' next series, the Bears defense struggled, allowing Stafford to complete passes of 42 and 16 yards to Tate and Theo Riddick, respectively, followed by a 22-yard touchdown pass to Tate, though it was nullified by Calvin Johnson's holding penalty. The Bears were forced to punt again, but Pat O'Donnell's punt hit Corey Fuller in the leg and safety Chris Prosinski recovered. In the fourth quarter, the Bears scored on Cutler's 11-yard touchdown pass to Jeffery, and regained possession quickly when Stafford's toss to Riddick deflected off of his hand and Anderson intercepted it. The Bears gained the lead with Forte's two-yard run, followed by Cutler's two-point conversion pass to Forte. However, the Lions took the lead with their next two scores: Matt Prater's 32-yard field goal and Stafford's six-yard touchdown pass to Johnson. With 21 seconds left in the fourth quarter, the Bears drove 69 yards to the Lions' 11, where Gould tied the game with a 29-yard kick. In overtime, the first four drives ended with punts, and on the fifth, Prater kicked a 27-yard field goal to claim the 37–34 win.

The game featured three controversial officiating calls. Regarding the second quarter Tate touchdown, Fox NFL commentator Ronde Barber and Fox rules analyst Mike Pereira believed Tate had not controlled the ball while falling to the turf. On the contrary, NFL Vice-president of Officiating Dean Blandino stated that Tate "controlled the pass right at the goal line. This is not a receiver who is going to the ground. He is taking his third step, he had demonstrated possession, had become a runner." Late in the fourth quarter, Pernell McPhee was penalized for roughing the passer when it appeared that he had been pushed into Stafford. During the Lions' game-winning drive in overtime, Willie Young was held, but no penalty was called. Due to the NFL's policies on criticizing officials, Cutler did not comment, while John Fox stated, "We’re not allowed to talk about officials."

==== Week 7: Bye week ====
The Bears entered the bye week with a 2–4 record, third in the division. To comply with the NFL's collective bargaining agreement, which required at least four straight off-days off for players on byes, the Bears only held practices on Tuesday and Wednesday.

Entering the bye, the Bears had the seventh-best third down conversion percentage with 43.68, while having 118 first downs converted, one more than that of teams that the Bears had played.

On October 22, Jeremiah Ratliff, who had been suspended for the first three games of the 2015 season, was released. Outside the Bears' training facility, he and Ryan Pace had "an animated exchange", forcing security to escort Ratliff out and Lake Forest police to report to the area; no police intervention occurred. Ratliff had reported to Halas Hall in poor condition, and when he was requested to leave and a relative to pick him up, he was "belligerent and insubordinate". To replace Ratliff, the Bears signed Jaguar Ziggy Hood later in the day.

==== Week 8: vs. Minnesota Vikings ====
Week Eight: Minnesota Vikings at Chicago Bears – Game summary

Quarter	1	2	3	4	Total
**Vikings**	7	3	0	13	**23**
Bears	3	7	3	7	**20**

at Soldier Field, Chicago, Illinois

- Date: November 1
- Game time: 12:00 pm. CST
- Game weather: 62 °F (17 °C), sunny
- Game attendance: 62,311
- Referee: John Hussey
- TV announcers (Fox): Chris Myers, Ronde Barber and Holly Sonders
- Recap, Gamebook

Game information

**First quarter**

- CHI – Robbie Gould 55-yard field goal, 10:56 (CHI 3–0). **Drive: 6 plays, 17 yards, 3:07**
- MIN – Marcus Sherels 65-yard punt return, Blair Walsh XP good, 3:37 (MIN 7–3).

**Second quarter**

- MIN – Blair Walsh 43-yard field goal, 9:05 (MIN 10–3). **Drive: 12 plays, 51 yards, 6:46**
- CHI – Alshon Jeffery 21-yard pass from Jay Cutler, Robbie Gould XP good, 0:42 (TIE 10–10). **Drive: 3 plays, 34 yards, 0:19**

**Third quarter**

- CHI – Robbie Gould 33-yard field goal, 8:28 (CHI 13–10). **Drive: 12 plays, 68 yards, 6:32**

**Fourth quarter**

- MIN – Blair Walsh 48-yard field goal, 13:29 (TIE 13–13). **Drive: 9 plays, 29 yards, 3:23**
- CHI – Jay Cutler 4-yard run, Robbie Gould XP good, 4:55 (CHI 20–13). **Drive: 14 plays, 74 yards, 8:34**
- MIN – Stefon Diggs 40-yard pass from Teddy Bridgewater, Blair Walsh XP good, 1:49 (MIN 20–20). **Drive: 7 plays, 84 yards, 3:06**
- MIN – Blair Walsh 36-yard field goal, 0:00 (MIN 23–20). **Drive: 4 plays, 48 yards, 1:00**

**Top passers**

- MIN – Teddy Bridgewater, 17/30, 187 yards, 1 TD, 1 INT
- CHI – Jay Cutler, 22/33, 211 yards, 1 TD

**Top rushers**

- MIN – Adrian Peterson, 20 carries, 103 yards
- CHI – Jeremy Langford, 12 carries, 46 yards

**Top receivers**

- MIN – Stefon Diggs, 6 receptions, 95 yards, 1 TD
- CHI – Alshon Jeffery, 10 receptions, 116 yards, 1 TD

**Top tacklers**

- MIN – Terence Newman, 6 tackles
- CHI – Christian Jones, 3 tackles

The Bears returned from the bye week by hosting the 4–2 Minnesota Vikings. In their rivalry, the Vikings led the all-time series 55–51–2, the Vikings winning the last game 13–9, though the Vikings had not beaten the Bears at Soldier Field since 2007. Jeff Joniak wrote that the offense had to protect Jay Cutler; the Vikings defense sacked Matthew Stafford seven times in week seven, with a total of 17 in 2015. In eleven career games against Minnesota, Cutler excelled, throwing 23 touchdowns and 13 interceptions, with an 8–3 record. A player that Joniak believed Cutler could attack is cornerback Xavier Rhodes, who allowed four passing touchdowns and a league-worst ten penalties. Additionally, the running backs could target a defense that allowed six yards per carry, one of the worst in the NFL. On defense, the Bears had to watch for Adrian Peterson, who averaged 88 rushing yards per game, including two consecutive games with at least 120 yards in each. Another player was quarterback Teddy Bridgewater, who completed 25 passes to eleven players in week seven, while watching for the speed of the Minnesota receiving corps. Despite such successes, as a whole, the Vikings offense was averaging 325.5 yards per game, the third-least in the league. In the red zone, the Vikings scored touchdowns on 42.11 percent of their drives, among the worst in the NFL. Terrance Mitchell, Shea McClellin, Hroniss Grasu, Jermon Bushrod, Bruce Gaston, Ka'Deem Carey and Cameron Meredith were inactive.

The Bears won the coin toss and deferred until the second half. The Bears special teams unit struggled, with returner Marc Mariani muffing the return on both of the Vikings' first two punts. Despite this, the Bears took the lead with Robbie Gould's 55-yard field goal. However, Minnesota scored on Marcus Sherels's 65-yard punt return touchdown, the third return touchdown allowed by the Bears in 2015. Despite this, Sherels muffed his return on the ensuing punt; Blair Walsh eventually kicked a 43-yard field goal in the second quarter to make the score 10–3. After the game's next three drives ended in punts (twice by the Bears), the first turnover of the game occurred when Kyle Fuller intercepted Bridgewater's pass for Stefon Diggs. The Bears capitalized on the takeaway with Cutler's 21-yard touchdown pass to Alshon Jeffery, who jumped over Rhodes to make the catch in the left corner of the endzone. In the third quarter, the Bears reclaimed the lead with Gould's 33-yard field goal, and after the Vikings punted, had the chance to increase the margin to six points on Gould's 51-yard attempt. However, Gould's kick went wide left, his first miss of the season and ending a 17-kick streak. Minnesota took advantage by tying the game via Walsh's 48-yard field goal. The game's next two possessions ended with touchdowns for both teams: the Bears scored with Cutler, whose targets (Jeffery and Mariani) were unavailable, running four yards and colliding with safety Harrison Smith at the goal line for the touchdown. Afterwards, the Vikings tied the score with Bridgewater throwing a pass to Diggs, who escaped Sherrick McManis to score on the 40-yard play. With 1:49 left in the game, the Bears' next drive ended with a punt to the Vikings' 22-yard line. However, aided by Bridgewater's 35-yard pass to Charles Johnson, Walsh kicked a 36-yard field goal as time expired to seal the win.

On Cutler's touchdown pass to Jeffery, he tied Sid Luckman for the most touchdown passes in Bears history with 137. Defensively, Pernell McPhee recorded his fifth sack during the game, and he became the first Bears player since Brian Urlacher in 2000 to have at least five sacks and one interception in the first seven games. During the second half, Matt Forte suffered a knee injury, and along with Eddie Royal, were missed the following week's game. The loss of Forte had been crucial for the Bears, as he had been responsible for 32 percent of yards gained in 2015, the most among running backs.

==== Week 9: at San Diego Chargers ====
Week Nine: Chicago Bears at San Diego Chargers – Game summary

Quarter	1	2	3	4	Total
**Bears**	0	7	0	15	**22**
Chargers	7	9	0	3	**19**

at Qualcomm Stadium, San Diego, California

- Date: November 9
- Game time: 7:30 pm. CST/5:30 pm. PST
- Game weather: 63 °F (17 °C), cloudy
- Game attendance: 68,033
- Referee: Craig Wrolstad
- TV announcers (ESPN): Mike Tirico, Jon Gruden and Lisa Salters
- Recap, Gamebook

Game information

**First quarter**

- SD – Danny Woodhead 14-yard pass from Philip Rivers, Josh Lambo XP good, 6:50 (SD 7–0). **Drive: 8 plays, 63 yards, 4:42**

**Second quarter**

- SD – Jason Verrett 68-yard interception return, XP failed, 9:58 (SD 13–0).
- CHI – Martellus Bennett 1-yard pass from Jay Cutler, Robbie Gould XP good, 6:53 (SD 13–7). **Drive: 7 plays, 80 yards, 3:05**
- SD – Josh Lambo 31-yard field goal, 0:03 (SD 16–7). **Drive: 11 plays, 81 yards, 2:03**

**Third quarter**

- No scoring plays

**Fourth quarter**

- CHI – Jeremy Langford 1-yard run, Robbie Gould XP good, 14:02 (SD 16–14). **Drive: 15 plays, 93 yards, 8:16**
- SD – Josh Lambo 22-yard field goal, 7:53 (SD 19–14). **Drive: 14 plays, 76 yards, 6:09**
- CHI – Zach Miller 25-yard pass from Jay Cutler, conversion good, 3:19 (CHI 22–19). **Drive: 10 plays, 80 yards, 4:34**

**Top passers**

- CHI – Jay Cutler, 27/40, 345 yards, 2 TD, 1 INT
- SD – Philip Rivers, 26/42, 280 yards, 1 TD

**Top rushers**

- CHI – Jeremy Langford, 18 carries, 72 yards, 1 TD
- SD – Danny Woodhead, 6 carries, 33 yards

**Top receivers**

- CHI – Alshon Jeffery, 10 receptions, 151 yards
- SD – Stevie Johnson, 7 receptions, 68 yards

**Top tacklers**

- CHI – Jonathan Anderson, 11 tackles
- SD – Eric Weddle, 9 tackles

On Monday Night Football, the Bears traveled west to face the 2–6 San Diego Chargers. The two teams last met in 2011 at Soldier Field, the Bears winning 31–20, though their last meeting in San Diego was in 2007, which the Chargers won 14–3, and the last MNF game in San Diego was a Chargers 20–7 victory in 1984; in eleven games, the Bears led the series 6–5. Jeff Joniak wrote that the Bears offense could capitalize on a defense that allowed the most yards after the catch in the NFL. Additionally, offenses often started drives at 32-yard line, ranked 31st in the league, while the Chargers also had the fewest points off turnovers with seven. The Chargers were also allowing 6.34 yards per play, the second-worst in the NFL. To attack, the offense would balance passes that focused on favorable receiver/cornerback matchups and run with Jeremy Langford, who was making his first career start with Matt Forte out. Defensively, the Bears faced an offense struggling with injuries, particularly at the line: of the five positions, four have seen two or more players starting. However, quarterback Philip Rivers excelled despite the injuries, having thrown for 18 touchdowns and 7.9 yards per pass, both of which were among the highest in the NFL; Rivers' performance had also enabled him to be in position to overtake Peyton Manning's single-season passing yards record. The Chargers had the top-ranked offense in the NFL, and also ranked first in yardage after the catch. Another offensive player that the Bears faced was tight end Antonio Gates, who led the league in career touchdowns with 101. However, the San Diego running game was struggling, with 3.6 rushing yards per play, which ranked 30th in the league. Special teams-wise, both teams were among the worst in the NFL: the Chargers were ranked 30th in average return yardage allowed, while the Bears were 31st; the former also allowed a league-high ten returns of 30–39 yards. For the Chargers' punt return unit, they had only one yard in 2015. San Diego also had league-worsts in starting yard line after kickoffs with 19.3 yards, drives starting within their own 20-yard line (11) and average starting area (21). Forte, receiver Eddie Royal, safety Harold Jones-Quartey, Shea McClellin, Hroniss Grasu, Tayo Fabuluje and defensive lineman Ziggy Hood were inactive.

The Chargers won the coin toss and elected to kick off. Despite reaching the Chargers' 28-yard line, two scoring opportunities were denied with Jason Verrett deflecting Jay Cutler's pass for Alshon Jeffery and Robbie Gould's field goal sailing wide left. Afterwards, the Chargers scored with Danny Woodhead's 14-yard touchdown catch from Rivers. On the Bears' next possession, the offense entered Charger territory again, reaching as far as the 10-yard line, where Cutler was sack-stripped by Melvin Ingram, with the ball being recovered by Eric Weddle, though the Chargers failed to capitalize and punted. After the Bears punted as well, they reclaimed the ball when Tracy Porter stripped Dontrelle Inman and linebacker Christian Jones recovered. However, after two plays, Verrett intercepted Cutler's pass for Jeffery, returning it 68 yards for the touchdown; the Chargers eventually missed the extra point, making the score 13–0. On the next drive, Cutler threw a one-yard touchdown pass to Martellus Bennett. After both teams exchanged punts, the Chargers scored the final points of the first half with Josh Lambo's 31-yard field goal. In the second half, after the Chargers punted, Gould's 34-yard field goal attempt hit the left upright. San Diego punted again, and the Bears engineered a 93-yard drive that culminated with Langford scoring on a one-yard run. The Chargers increased the margin to five points with Lambo kicking a 22-yard field goal. Guiding an 80-yard drive, Cutler threw a 25-yard pass to tight end Zach Miller, who caught the pass with one hand as he scored the go-ahead touchdown. Afterwards, Langford scored on the two-point conversion. The Chargers' final drive fell apart with plays like Lamarr Houston's two sacks, and on 4th down and 23, Rivers' deep pass fell incomplete. With 1:09 left in the game, Cutler kneeled three times to end the game.

With Cutler's touchdown to Bennett, he overtook Sid Luckman for the most passing touchdowns in franchise history with 138. Additionally, his final touchdown marked his twelfth fourth quarter touchdown, the most in the league. Miller's touchdown catch was his first since the 2011 season.

==== Week 10: at St. Louis Rams ====
Week Ten: Chicago Bears at St. Louis Rams – Game summary

Quarter	1	2	3	4	Total
**Bears**	10	14	0	13	**37**
Rams	10	0	3	0	**13**

at Edward Jones Dome, St. Louis, Missouri

- Date: November 15
- Game time: 12:00 pm. CST
- Game weather: Played indoors (dome stadium)
- Game attendance: 58,653
- Referee: Jeff Triplette
- TV announcers (CBS): Andrew Catalon, Steve Beuerlein and Steve Tasker
- Recap, Gamebook

Game information

**First quarter**

- STL – Todd Gurley 6-yard run, Greg Zuerlein XP good, 12:01 (STL 7–0). **Drive: 7 plays, 80 yards, 2:59**
- CHI – Zach Miller 87-yard pass from Jay Cutler, Robbie Gould XP good, 11:10 (TIE 7–7). **Drive: 2 plays, 86 yards, 0:51**
- STL – Greg Zuerlein 26-yard field goal, 5:09 (STL 10–7). **Drive: 4 plays, 9 yards, 2:30**
- CHI – Robbie Gould 35-yard field goal, 0:03 (TIE 10–10). **Drive: 4 plays, 2 yards, 0:49**

**Second quarter**

- CHI – Zach Miller 2-yard pass from Jay Cutler, Robbie Gould XP good, 6:56 (CHI 17–10). **Drive: 12 plays, 70 yards, 7:18**
- CHI – Jeremy Langford 83-yard pass from Jay Cutler, Robbie Gould XP good, 5:00 (CHI 24–10). **Drive: 2 plays, 86 yards, 0:59**

**Third quarter**

- STL – Greg Zuerlein 38-yard field goal, 2:41 (CHI 24–13). **Drive: 10 plays, 68 yards, 4:24**

**Fourth quarter**

- CHI – Robbie Gould 37-yard field goal, 11:24 (CHI 27–13). **Drive: 12 plays, 61 yards, 6:13**
- CHI – Robbie Gould 36-yard field goal, 8:05 (CHI 30–13). **Drive: 4 plays, 5 yards, 2:07**
- CHI – Jeremy Langford 6-yard run, Robbie Gould XP good, 4:55 (CHI 37–13). **Drive: 5 plays, 24 yards, 1:43**

**Top passers**

- CHI – Jay Cutler, 19/24, 258 yards, 3 TD
- STL – Nick Foles, 17/36, 200 yards, 1 INT

**Top rushers**

- CHI – Jeremy Langford, 20 carries, 73 yards, 1 TD
- STL – Todd Gurley, 12 carries, 45 yards, 1 TD

**Top receivers**

- CHI – Jeremy Langford, 7 receptions, 109 yards, 1 TD
- STL – Todd Gurley, 3 receptions, 44 yards

**Top tacklers**

- CHI – Shea McClellin, 6 tackles
- STL – Mark Barron, 6 tackles

Week 10's game was on the road in St. Louis, where the Bears played the 4–4 Rams. Historically, the two teams have played each other often, with the Rams joining the Cardinals as the most common opponent outside of the NFC North; the Bears held the series lead 52–36–3, though the Rams won the last game in 2013 42–21. Chicago's offense faced a defense with a stingy pass rush that featured 14 players with at least .5 sacks and eight with at least two. The rush had the second-most sacks in the league with 27, while Robert Quinn, despite missing the previous week's game with a knee injury, led the Rams with five. The Rams blitzed often, with six sacks on first down and five on second and third, with the combined 16 sacks on blitzes being the most in the league. The St. Louis secondary starred Janoris Jenkins and Trumaine Johnson, who broke up a combined 18 passes and allowed only two touchdowns in 2015. As a unit, the Rams defense allowed no touchdowns in the last ten-quarters, while also having the second-best scoring defense in the NFL with 13.8 points per game, while also being one of three teams to force at least 70 negative plays. Jeff Joniak wrote that the Bears had to excel on third down; the Bears' 30th-ranked third down offense took on a defense that was ranked fifth in the category. For the Bears defense, rookie running back Todd Gurley was a target; in his first four games, he averaged 141 rushing yards on 22 attempts, and by week ten, had the fourth-most rushing yards in the league and a league-high 5.6 yards per carry. Additionally, the defense had to pressure quarterback Nick Foles: in the red zone, he completed only 47 percent of his passes with two interceptions; on third down situations, he completed only 46 percent with four interceptions; when blitzed, he completed 54 percent with five sacks, though he also has five touchdowns. Like the Bears, the Rams' third-down offense struggled, being ranked last in third down conversions with 23.8 percent. Special teams-wise, the punt unit had to stop Tavon Austin, who scored one of the NFL's eight punt return touchdowns in 2015. To get to Austin, punter Pat O'Donnell's hang time of 4.56 seconds (third-best in the NFL) could allow the unit's gunners to reach him. In contrast, the Rams kick return team was struggling, being ranked 30th with nine starts after kickoffs within their own 20-yard line, while also ranking 23rd in kick return yards with 22.4. Rams kicker/punter duo of Greg Zuerlein and Johnny Hekker are among the best in the NFL: Hekker had a gross punt average of 48 yards, one of seven punters to do so, while also being ranked fourth in net average with 43.3; Zuerlein had kicked a 61-yard field goal against the Vikings in week nine, but was missing a league-high seven field goals, including two that were blocked. Eddie Royal, Matt Forte, return man Deonte Thompson, Harold Jones-Quartey, Hroniss Grasu, Ziggy Hood and Pernell McPhee were inactive.

The Bears won the coin toss and elected to kick off. The Rams scored on the opening possession with Gurley's six-yard touchdown run, but the Bears tied the score on a two-play drive; after Jeremy Langford was stopped for a one-yard loss, Jay Cutler threw a short pass to Zach Miller, who managed to break free and score on the 87-yard play. The next drive for the Rams saw the offense go three-and-out, but on the punt return, Marc Mariani was quickly hit by Bradley Marquez and fumbled, with the ball being recovered by St. Louis' Maurice Alexander. On the first play since the turnover, Austin scored on a 17-yard reverse, but the touchdown was nullified by Greg Robinson's holding penalty; the Rams eventually had to settle for Zuerlein's 26-yard field goal. After the Bears punted, they regained possession on the first play of the Rams' next drive, when Shea McClellin stripped Tre Mason and recovered the ball. Robbie Gould eventually kicked a 35-yard field goal to tie the score at the end of the first quarter. The Rams punted on their next drive, and the Bears took the lead with Cutler throwing a two-yard touchdown pass to Miller. St. Louis later punted again, and Chicago's next series started at their own 14-yard line due to cornerback Alan Ball's holding penalty on the punt return. After Langford's three-yard run, Cutler held off a blitzing defense to throw a screen pass to Langford, who scored on the 83-yard play. The two teams exchanged punts for the remainder of the half; the first three drives of the second half also ended in punts. Afterwards, the two teams traded field goals, Zuerlein's being 38 yards and Gould's being 33 yards. On St. Louis' next drive, the team elected to try a fake punt, but Hekker's pass to Cody Davis fell short. The Bears increased the lead to 17 points with Gould's 36-yard field goal, and after the Rams' turned the ball over on downs again, scored on Langford's six-yard touchdown run. The next two drives ended with turnovers for both teams: Willie Young intercepted Foles, but runningback Ka'Deem Carey fumbled after being hit by Rodney McLeod, with the fumble being recovered by Aaron Donald. With 2:23 left in the game, the Rams reached the Bears' 28-yard line before time expired.

Miller's first touchdown was the longest catch by a tight end since Byron Chamberlain's 88-yard play in 1999 and the longest touchdown reception by a Bear since Matt Forte's 89-yard score in 2010. With the score and Langford's 83-yard touchdown, the Bears became the first team since the 2006 Buffalo Bills to score multiple touchdowns of at least 80 yards in a game.

==== Week 11: vs. Denver Broncos ====
Week Eleven: Denver Broncos at Chicago Bears – Game summary

Quarter	1	2	3	4	Total
**Broncos**	7	3	0	7	**17**
Bears	0	6	3	6	**15**

at Soldier Field, Chicago, Illinois

- Date: November 22
- Game time: 12:00 pm. CST
- Game weather: 29 °F (−2 °C), sunny
- Game attendance: 62,483
- Referee: Pete Morelli
- TV announcers (CBS): Ian Eagle, Dan Fouts and Evan Washburn
- Recap, Gamebook

Game information

**First quarter**

- DEN – Demaryius Thomas 48-yard pass from Brock Osweiler, Brandon McManus XP good, 12:14 (DEN 7–0). **Drive: 4 plays, 74 yards, 1:34.**

**Second quarter**

- CHI – Robbie Gould 46-yard field goal, 10:32 (DEN 7–3). **Drive: 10 plays, 58 yards, 4;16.**
- CHI – Robbie Gould 37-yard field goal, 6:13 (DEN 7–6). **Drive: 7 plays, 50 yards, 2:57.**
- DEN – Brandon McManus 24-yard field goal, 0:00 (DEN 10–6). **Drive: 13 plays, 82 yards, 3:40.**

**Third quarter**

- CHI – Robbie Gould 37-yard field goal, 0:49 (DEN 10–9). **Drive: 8 plays, 79 yards, 3:33.**

**Fourth quarter**

- DEN – Cody Latimer 10-yard pass from Brock Osweiler, Brandon McManus XP good, 11:42 (DEN 17–9). **Drive: 10 plays, 71 yards, 4:07.**
- CHI – Jeremy Langford 2-yard run, conversion failed, 0:24 (DEN 17–15). **Drive: 6 plays, 65 yards, 1:25**

**Top passers**

- DEN – Brock Osweiler, 20/27, 250 yards, 2 TD
- CHI – Jay Cutler, 18/32, 265 yards, 1 INT

**Top rushers**

- DEN – Ronnie Hillman, 21 carries, 102 yards
- CHI – Ka'Deem Carey, 9 carries, 32 yards

**Top receivers**

- DEN – Vernon Davis, 6 receptions, 68 yards
- CHI – Marquess Wilson, 4 receptions 102 yards

**Top tacklers**

- DEN – Danny Trevathan, 7 tackles, 1 INT
- CHI – Christian Jones, 6 tackles

John Fox, joined by coordinators Adam Gase and Jeff Rodgers and quarterback Jay Cutler, faced their former team in the Denver Broncos for week eleven. It would also be the coldest game the Bears would play in 2015. In 14 games, the two teams split the series, though the Broncos won the most recent game in 2011 13–10. In the last game at Soldier Field, the Bears won 37–34. The offense took on one of the league's top defenses, Denver's pass rush leading the NFL in sacks with 32, with twelve players with at least .5 sacks. The Broncos defense was allowing the fewest average yards with 277.3, while also allowing the third-fewest points per game with 18.7. Despite DeMarcus Ware being out with a back injury, the Broncos still had Von Miller, who had more than five sacks in 2015. For the Bears, despite Alshon Jeffery and Eddie Royal's injuries, Martellus Bennett and Zach Miller could still play a role. If passing, Cutler had to watch for defensive lineman Malik Jackson, who had four pass breakups in the previous four games. When the Bears decide to run, they faced a run defense that led the league in multiple categories, including sack percentage. The Broncos offense was without Peyton Manning, and in his place was Brock Osweiler. Osweiler, who had 305 career passing yards, had only played in garbage time during his NFL career, but fits Gary Kubiak's West Coast offense. Jeff Joniak believed with Osweiler, the Broncos' plays, which consisted of 64 percent passes, would decrease, though tight ends Owen Daniels and Vernon Davis could be targeted more often. Meanwhile, Denver's rushing attack was struggling during the season, with an average of 86 rushing yards per game, 29th-ranked in the NFL.

The Broncos won the coin toss and deferred until the second half. After the Bears punted, Osweiler threw a pass to Demaryius Thomas, who escaped Chris Prosinski to score on the 48-yard play. After both teams exchanged punts, the Bears scored their first points of the game in the second quarter with Robbie Gould's 46-yard field goal, and narrowed the margin to one point when Gould scored on a 37-yard kick. Denver and Chicago traded punts again, but the former scored with Brandon McManus' 24-yard field goal as time expired in the second quarter to make the score 10–6. The first three drives of the second half ended with punts, though the first turnover of the game occurred on the next series, when Cutler's pass for receiver Marquess Wilson was intercepted by Danny Trevathan. However, the Broncos failed to capitalize when Ronnie Hillman was tripped by Osweiler's feet on fourth down. Afterwards, aided by two consecutive 29-yard plays (via Brandon Marshall's defensive pass interference, followed by Wilson's 29-yard catch), the Bears reached the Broncos' 19-yard line, where Gould eventually kicked a 37-yard field goal. The Broncos later increased their lead by eight when Osweiler threw a ten-yard touchdown pass to Cody Latimer. On the Bears' next series, Cutler capitalized on a late hit by T. J. Ward and a 40-yard pass to Wilson to reach the Broncos' seven-yard line. Despite reaching as far as the four, the Bears turned the ball over on downs with three consecutive incomplete passes. Although Denver punted again and the Chicago offense reaching the Broncos' 33-yard line, Cutler was hit from behind by Marshall while throwing, and the ball was intercepted by Malik Jackson. The Broncos were forced to punt again, and with 1:25 left in the game, the Bears drove 65 yards, where Jeremy Langford scored on a two-yard run. However, Langford was stopped short on the two-point conversion, and on the onside kick, Thomas recovered. Osweiler kneeled once to end the game.

The Bears ended the game with no penalties for the first time since 1995 against the Philadelphia Eagles and becoming the 24th team to do so in the last 15 years; the Bears also became the first team to accomplish the feat in a loss since the 2013 Packers' loss to the Bears in week nine. The defense recorded five sacks, the team's most in 2015.

==== Week 12: at Green Bay Packers ====
Thanksgiving Day game

Week Twelve: Chicago Bears at Green Bay Packers – Game summary

Quarter	1	2	3	4	Total
**Bears**	0	14	0	3	**17**
Packers	7	6	0	0	**13**

at Lambeau Field, Green Bay, Wisconsin

- Date: November 26
- Game time: 7:30 pm. CST
- Game weather: 39 °F (4 °C), rain
- Game attendance: 78,488
- Referee: Ed Hochuli
- TV announcers (NBC): Al Michaels, Cris Collinsworth and Michele Tafoya
- Recap, Gamebook

Game information

**First quarter**

- GB – Eddie Lacy 25-yard pass from Aaron Rodgers, Mason Crosby XP good, 5:20 (GB 7–0). **Drive: 5 plays, 44 yards, 1:51.**

**Second quarter**

- CHI – Zach Miller 3-yard pass from Jay Cutler, Robbie Gould XP good, 6:03 (TIE 7–7). **Drive: 9 plays, 34 yards, 4:39.**
- GB – Mason Crosby 22-yard field goal, 1:58 (GB 10–7). **Drive: 7 plays, 38 yards, 4:00.**
- CHI – Jeremy Langford 1-yard run, Robbie Gould XP good, 0:30 (CHI 14–10). **Drive: 7 plays, 58 yards, 1:28.**
- GB – Mason Crosby 50-yard field goal, 0:00 (CHI 14–13). **Drive: 5 plays, 36 yards, 0:26.**

**Third quarter** **Fourth quarter**

- CHI – Robbie Gould 21-yard field goal, 12:15 (CHI 17–13). **Drive: 15 plays, 65 yards, 7:33.**

**Top passers**

- CHI – Jay Cutler, 19/31, 200 yards, 1 TD
- GB – Aaron Rodgers, 22/43, 202 yards, 1 TD, 1 INT

**Top rushers**

- CHI – Jeremy Langford, 12 carries, 48 yards, 1 TD
- GB – Eddie Lacy, 17 carries, 105 yards

**Top receivers**

- CHI – Alshon Jeffery, 7 receptions, 90 yards
- GB – Randall Cobb, 6 receptions, 74 yards

**Top tacklers**

- CHI – Chris Prosinski, Shea McClellin, Adrian Amos, 7 tackles
- GB – Morgan Burnett, 6 tackles

The second game of 2015 against the Packers was held on Thanksgiving Day in Green Bay. The two teams, in their 190th meeting, had never played each other on the holiday; in Thanksgiving games, the Bears were 16–15–2, while the Packers were 14–19–2. Chicago's offense took on a defense that ranked second in the league in first quarter points allowed with 1.9, along with a defense that recorded six sacks in week eleven against Minnesota. Jeff Joniak added that the offense had to improve its red zone performance; against Denver, the Bears failed to score on three of the four trips to the red zone, leading to a 41.2 percent touchdown efficiency in 2015; in ten games, the Bears were only able to score 14 touchdowns within the 20-yard line. On the other side, Joniak stated the defense had to stop the Packers offense early; since 2014, the Packers had outscored opponents 151–27 at Lambeau, while also leading the league in first quarter points with an average of 7.6. Aaron Rodgers had thrown eight first quarter touchdown passes (the most in the NFL) in 2015, while the Packers had a league-best +57 scoring differential. Meanwhile, the Bears defense had allowed nine touchdowns in the first, though the defense had not given up a touchdown in the third quarter. Joniak also wrote that the Bears had to "match and surpass the emotion" on a night that featured Brett Favre's jersey retirement "with their most physical, error-free and consistent performance". Eddie Royal, Ka'Deem Carey, Martellus Bennett, Antrel Rolle, cornerback Jacoby Glenn, Nick Becton and Will Sutton were inactive.

The Bears won the toss and deferred. The first four drives of the game ended without scores, as the Packers turned the ball over on downs during their first drive and the ensuing series were punts. On the next drive, Tracy Porter intercepted Rodgers, but was penalized for illegal contact, and the play was nullified. Afterwards, Rodgers threw a 25-yard touchdown pass to Lacy. The Bears' woes continued with the following kickoff, when Marc Mariani and Deonte Thompson collided while attempting to catch the kick and the latter had to kneel in the endzone for the touchback. The next four possessions led to punts; on Green Bay's next drive, Lacy recorded a 15-yard run, but was hit from behind by Chris Prosinski and fumbled, with the ball being recovered by Lamarr Houston. Chicago took advantage of the takeaway when Jay Cutler threw a three-yard touchdown pass to Zach Miller. However, on the next kickoff, nickelback Bryce Callahan missed a tackle and allowed Jeff Janis to record a 64-yard return; the Packers eventually converted it into a 22-yard field goal. Assisted by a 37-yard kickoff return by Thompson, the Bears offense scored with Cutler's 20-yard touchdown pass to Marquess Wilson, but the play was overturned after he was downed at the one. Afterwards, Jeremy Langford's one-yard run gave the Bears the 14–10 lead. Mason Crosby kicked a 50-yard field goal to end the half. The third quarter featured no scores, though the Bears' last drive of the quarter (which lasted into the final quarter) ended with Robbie Gould's 21-yard field goal to extend the lead by four points. After two further punts, Rodgers' slant pass for Davante Adams was intercepted by Porter. However, the Bears were unable to capitalize, and punted. With 2:23 left in the game, the Packers drove from their own 20-yard line to the Bears' eight. Rodgers' passes to James Jones, Richard Rodgers and Adams all fell incomplete, and Cutler kneeled once to seal the win.

With the win, the Bears won their third consecutive away game for the first time since 2012. Over the last four games, the Bears allowed less than 20 points in each, also last accomplished in 2012. The game averaged 27.8 million viewers, the most-watched Thanksgiving primetime game in NFL history and the second-highest viewed regular season game for NBC.

==== Week 13: vs. San Francisco 49ers ====
Week Thirteen: San Francisco 49ers at Chicago Bears – Game summary

Quarter	1	2	3	4	OT	Total
**49ers**	6	7	0	7	6	**26**
Bears	6	7	0	7	0	**20**

at Soldier Field, Chicago, Illinois

- Date: December 6
- Game time: 12:00 pm. CST
- Game weather: 50 °F (10 °C), sunny
- Game attendance: 62,088
- Referee: Jerome Boger
- TV announcers (Fox): Kenny Albert, Daryl Johnston and Laura Okmin
- Recap, Gamebook

Game information

**First quarter**

- CHI – Robbie Gould 40-yard field goal, 10:17 (CHI 3–0). **Drive: 7 plays, 19 yards, 3:25**
- CHI – Robbie Gould 51-yard field goal, 5:59 (CHI 6–0). **Drive: 6 plays, 20 yards, 2:52**
- SF – Jimmie Ward 29-yard interception return, XP failed, 2:49 (TIE 6–6).

**Second quarter**

- CHI – Matt Forte 5-yard run, Robbie Gould XP good, 13:37 (CHI 13–6). **Drive: 8 plays, 80 yards, 4:12**
- SF – Shaun Draughn 1-yard run, Phil Dawson XP good, 6:53 (TIE 13–13). **Drive: 16 plays, 81 yards, 6:44**

**Third quarter**

- No scoring plays

**Fourth quarter**

- CHI – Ka'Deem Carey 4-yard run, Robbie Gould XP good, 3:32 (CHI 20–13). **Drive: 6 plays, 83 yards, 3:53**
- SF – Blaine Gabbert, 44-yard run, Phil Dawson XP good, 1:42 (TIE 20–20). **Drive: 6 plays, 64 yards, 1:50**

**Overtime**

- SF – Torrey Smith 71-yard pass from Blaine Gabbert, 12:50 (SF 26–20). **Drive: 1 play, 71 yards, 0:11**

**Top passers**

- SF – Blaine Gabbert, 18/32, 196 yards, 1 TD
- CHI – Jay Cutler, 18/31, 202 yards, 1 INT

**Top rushers**

- SF – Blaine Gabbert, 6 carries, 75 yards
- CHI – Matt Forte, 21 carries, 81 yards, 1 TD

**Top receivers**

- SF – Shaun Draughn, 5 receptions, 50 yards
- CHI – Matt Forte, 5 receptions, 39 yards

**Top tacklers**

- SF – NaVorro Bowman, 13 tackles
- CHI – Shea McClellin, 9 tackles

The 3–8 San Francisco 49ers visited Soldier Field in week thirteen; in 63 all-time meetings, the 49ers held the lead 32–30–1, though the Bears won the last game in 2014 28–20. The Bears offense took on a defense featuring linebackers NaVorro Bowman, Aaron Lynch and Ahmad Brooks, who had a combined 12.5 sacks in 2015, including 6.5 by Lynch. Alshon Jeffery provided a size advantage over cornerbacks Tramaine Brock and Kenneth Acker, the duo having a combined 90 tackles, six interceptions, and 14 pass breakups. As a unit, the 49ers defense had struggled, allowing an average of 400 yards, 8.13 yards per pass (29th overall), 17 touchdown passes and a 100.5 opponent quarterback rating (also 29th-ranked). Despite these troubles, the 49ers had held the Cardinals, who had the league's best scoring offense, to just 19 points in week twelve. As for the Bears defense, the 29th-ranked rushing defense took on a running attack without Carlos Hyde. 49ers quarterback Blaine Gabbert had been improving, throwing for 318 yards against Arizona, while his top receiver Anquan Boldin had recorded 44 catches for 558 yards, 28 of which resulted in first downs. However, the San Francisco offense had the fewest points in the NFL with 152, a league-low 14 combined touchdowns, and a worst-ranked 31 plays of at least 20 yards. Meanwhile, the Bears had allowed an average of 17 points per game in the last five, the fourth-fewest in the league. Marquess Wilson, Eddie Royal, Antrel Rolle, Nick Becton, Jacoby Glenn, Antone Smith and Bruce Gaston were inactive.

The Bears won the coin toss and elected to defer. The 49ers went three-and-out and punted; on the return, the Bears behaved as if Marc Mariani was returning on one side of the field, though Bryce Callahan actually returned it, and scored on the 65-yard play. However, a holding penalty on linebacker LaRoy Reynolds nullified the play. The Bears eventually scored a field goal with Robbie Gould's 40-yard kick. After the 49ers punted again, the Bears scored another field goal, this one being 51 yards. San Francisco subsequently punted, but scored on the second play of the Bears' next drive when Jimmie Ward intercepted Jay Cutler's screen pass for Alshon Jeffery and returned it 29 yards for the touchdown; the score remained tied after defensive tackle Eddie Goldman blocked the extra point. Chicago's next drive lasted into the second quarter, where Matt Forte took advantage of two consecutive 14-yard plays to score on a five-yard run. The 49ers scored on their drive with Shaun Draughn's one-yard touchdown run to tie the score. The first half ended with both teams tied 13–13. The Bears received the ball to start the third quarter, but failed to score when new long snapper Patrick Scales' snap was low and Gould missed the 40-yard kick. The next seven drives all ended in punts; the trend was broken when Ka'Deem Carey scored on a four-yard run, followed by San Francisco retaliating with Gabbert scoring on a 44-yard run. On the ensuing kickoff, Deonte Thompson's return went 74 yards to reach the 49ers' 28-yard line. On the drive, the Bears ran on each play, forcing the 49ers to use all three timeouts. With two seconds left, Gould's 36-yard field goal sailed wide left, resulting in overtime. The 49ers won the coin toss but punted, though the Bears were also forced to punt. On the first play of the next series, Gabbert threw a 71-yard touchdown pass to Torrey Smith to seal the win.

==== Week 14: vs. Washington Redskins ====
Week Fourteen: Washington Redskins at Chicago Bears – Game summary

Quarter	1	2	3	4	Total
**Redskins**	7	7	7	3	**24**
Bears	0	7	14	0	**21**

at Soldier Field, Chicago, Illinois

- Date: December 13
- Game time: 12:00 pm. CST
- Game weather: 62 °F (17 °C), cloudy
- Game attendance: 61,026
- Referee: Ron Torbert
- TV announcers (Fox): Kenny Albert, Daryl Johnston and Laura Okmin
- Recap, Gamebook

Game information

**First quarter**

- WAS – Alfred Morris 1-yard run, Dustin Hopkins XP good, 6:30 (WAS 7–0). **Drive: 15 plays, 80 yards, 8:30**

**Second quarter**

- WAS – Kirk Cousins 3-yard run, Dustin Hopkins XP good, 14:19 (WAS 14–0). **Drive: 8 plays, 93 yards, 3:18**
- CHI – Alshon Jeffery 20-yard pass from Jay Cutler, Robbie Gould XP good, 0:18 (WAS 14–7). **Drive: 5 plays, 58 yards, 0:52**

**Third quarter**

- WAS – Jordan Reed 5-yard pass from Kirk Cousins, Dustin Hopkins XP good, 8:00 (WAS 21–7). **Drive: 10 plays, 62 yards, 5:35**
- CHI – Zach Miller 9-yard pass from Jay Cutler, Robbie Gould XP good, 3:42 (WAS 21–14). **Drive: 10 plays, 80 yards, 4:18**
- CHI – Matt Forte 7-yard run, Robbie Gould XP good, 1:24 (TIE 21–21). **Drive: 3 plays, 21 yards, 1:18**

**Fourth quarter**

- WAS – Dustin Hopkins 47-yard field goal, 14:07 (WAS 24–21). **Drive: 7 plays, 51 yards, 2:17**

**Top passers**

- WAS – Kirk Cousins, 24/31, 300 yards, 1 TD, 1 INT
- CHI – Jay Cutler, 19/31, 315 yards, 2 TD

**Top rushers**

- WAS – Matt Jones, 18 carries, 62 yards
- CHI – Matt Forte, 10 carries, 45 yards, 1 TD

**Top receivers**

- WAS – Jordan Reed, 9 receptions, 120 yards, 1 TD
- CHI – Alshon Jeffery, 6 receptions, 107 yards, 1 TD

**Top tacklers**

- WAS – Mason Foster, 6 tackles
- CHI – Lamarr Houston, 8 tackles

The fourteenth week of the season featured a game between 5–7 teams as the Washington Redskins visited Soldier Field. In 48 games, the Redskins led the series 24–23–1 and had won the last five meetings. The Chicago offense took on a Washington defense that excelled against passers, being ranked tenth in the category; Dashon Goldson led all defensive backs in tackles with 95, while Bashaud Breeland led the team in passes defended with 13. The Redskins defensive rush, which had 20 sacks in 2015, was led by Ryan Kerrigan, who has 6.5. Despite such performances, the Redskins rush defense was ranked 29th in yards per carry with 4.64 and 25th in average rushing yards at 124.2. Jeff Joniak writes that the Bears could exploit this with the three-man rushing attack of Matt Forte, Jeremy Langford, and Ka'Deem Carey. On defense, the Bears faced a Kirk Cousins-led offense that focuses on quick passes; Cousins completed a league-high 68.6 percent of his passes, with 7.1 yards per pass. One of Cousins' main targets was tight end Jordan Reed, who scored six touchdowns and led the Redskins in yards after the catch. Rankings-wise, the pass attack was ranked 17th in the league in passing yards per game and 16th for yards per play. Joniak states that the Bears had to force turnovers, and an area was on third down, as five of Cousins' interceptions had been on third down.

The Bears won the coin toss and elected to defer. Washington recorded a 15-play, 80-yard drive en route to scoring on Alfred Morris' one-yard touchdown run. After the Bears punted, the Redskins scored again with Cousins' fake read option leading to a three-yard touchdown run in the second quarter. Chicago's woes continued when the offense began the next drive on their own seven-yard line, and despite reaching the Washington 49, Jay Cutler was strip-sacked by Trent Murphy, who recovered the fumble. The Redskins failed to capitalize on the turnover and punted; the following two drives also ended with punts. With 52 seconds left in the first half, the Bears took over at their own 42, and managed to score with 18 seconds left when Cutler threw a 20-yard touchdown pass to Alshon Jeffery. Cousins kneeled once to end the half. After the Bears punted on the first drive of the second half, Cousins threw a five-yard touchdown pass to Reed. The Bears responded with Cutler's nine-yard touchdown pass to Zach Miller, who managed to escape DeAngelo Hall and made contact with Goldson as he reached the endzone. The score was the Bears' first third quarter touchdown of 2015. Afterwards, Cousins' pass for Pierre Garçon was intercepted by Kyle Fuller, and the Bears took advantage with Forte's seven-yard touchdown run to tie the score. Dustin Hopkins gave the Redskins the 24–21 lead on the first drive of the final quarter with a 47-yard field goal. Five drives later, the Bears attempted a 53-yard field goal with 1:40 left in the game. However, Robbie Gould's kick sailed wide left, and the Redskins ran the ball three times to end the game.

==== Week 15: at Minnesota Vikings ====
Week Fifteen: Chicago Bears at Minnesota Vikings – Game summary

Quarter	1	2	3	4	Total
Bears	0	7	3	7	**17**
**Vikings**	7	10	7	14	**38**

at TCF Bank Stadium, Minneapolis, Minnesota

- Date: December 20
- Game time: 12:00 pm. CST
- Game weather: 36 °F (2 °C), cloudy
- Game attendance: 52,421
- Referee: Brad Allen
- TV announcers (Fox): Kevin Burkhardt, John Lynch and Pam Oliver
- Recap, Gamebook

Game information

**First quarter**

- MIN – Stefon Diggs 15-yard pass from Teddy Bridgewater, Blair Walsh XP good, 5:44 (MIN 7–0). **Drive: 13 plays, 93 yards, 6:22**

**Second quarter**

- MIN – Blair Walsh 53-yard field goal, 14:22 (MIN 10–0). **Drive: 8 plays, 36 yards, 4:16**
- CHI – Alshon Jeffery 10-yard pass from Jay Cutler, Robbie Gould XP good, 5:40 (MIN 10–7). **Drive: 6 plays, 52 yards, 2:25**
- MIN – Jerick McKinnon 17-yard pass from Teddy Bridgewater, Blair Walsh XP good, 0:26 (MIN 17–7). **Drive: 8 plays, 80 yards, 5:15**

**Third quarter**

- MIN – Stefon Diggs 33-yard pass from Teddy Bridgewater, Blair Walsh XP good, 10:40 (MIN 24–7). **Drive: 6 plays, 55 yards, 3:10**
- CHI – Robbie Gould 51-yard field goal, 4:23 (MIN 24–10). **Drive: 15 plays, 47 yards, 6:14**

**Fourth quarter**

- MIN – Teddy Bridgewater 12-yard run, Blair Walsh XP good, 8:45 (MIN 31–10). **Drive: 3 plays, 13 yards, 1:10**
- CHI – Matt Forte 4-yard pass from Jay Cutler, Robbie Gould XP good, 5:13 (MIN 31–17). **Drive: 9 plays, 65 yards, 3:32**
- MIN – Zach Line 4-yard pass from Teddy Bridgewater, Blair Walsh XP god, 1:50 (MIN 38–17). **Drive: 8 plays, 43 yards, 3:23**

**Top passers**

- CHI – Jay Cutler, 26/37, 231 yards, 2 TD, 1 INT
- MIN – Teddy Bridgewater, 17/20, 231 yards, 4 TD

**Top rushers**

- CHI – Matt Forte, 8 carries, 47 yards
- MIN – Adrian Peterson, 18 carries, 63 yards

**Top receivers**

- CHI – Matt Forte, 6 receptions, 57 yards, 1 TD
- MIN – Jerick McKinnon, 4 receptions, 76 yards, 1 TD

**Top tacklers**

- CHI – John Timu, 8 tackles
- MIN – Terence Newman, 8 tackles

The second game of the Bears-Vikings rivalry took place in Minneapolis and was the third game at TCF Bank Stadium; the Bears won the first game in 2010 while the Vikings won in 2014. To succeed against the Vikings, Jeff Joniak writes that the Bears had to excel at the start of the game; offensively, the Bears had a first quarter scoring differential of -48, 31st in the league, while scoring only twice on game-opening possessions. In the third quarter, the Bears scored a league-worst 32 points; in comparison, the Vikings defense had allowed only one touchdown on opening drives and a league-low 37 points in the third quarter. The defense took on a Vikings offense spearheaded by Adrian Peterson, whose 1,251 yards led the league. On special teams, the Vikings led the league in post-kickoff starting position, while being ranked third in returns of at least 20 yards with 26 and first in returns of at least 40 yards with five. Additionally, kickoff returner Cordarrelle Patterson led the league in return average with 31.1 yards. Christian Jones, Cameron Meredith, Bryce Callahan, Nick Becton, Tayo Fabuluje, Jacoby Glenn and Antone Smith were inactive.

The Vikings won the toss and deferred. Despite a 49-yard kick return by Deonte Thompson, the Bears' struggles began quickly, with the drive stalling after a holding penalty on Hroniss Grasu and a sack. Afterwards, the Vikings scored on their first drive when Stefon Diggs beat Tracy Porter to score on a 15-yard touchdown. The Vikings increased the score with Blair Walsh's 53-yard field goal in the second quarter. After the next two drives ended with punts, Alshon Jeffery caught a ten-yard touchdown pass from Jay Cutler to draw the Bears within three points. On the following series, the Vikings responded when Teddy Bridgewater escaped a blitz to throw a pass to Jerick McMcKinnon, who beat Shea McClellin to score on the 17-yard play. To start the second half, the Bears attempted an onside kick, and Sherrick McManis recovered. However, after three plays, Brian Robison sacked and stripped Jay Cutler, recovering the fumble; Minnesota took advantage with Stefon Diggs beating Alan Ball to score on the 33-yard touchdown. The Bears decreased the margin to two touchdowns when Robbie Gould kicked a 51-yard field goal; the next three consecutive drives concluded with punts. Afterwards, Cutler's screen pass to Matt Forte was intercepted by Justin Trattou, and the Vikings capitalized on the turnover with Bridgewater's 12-yard touchdown run, though the Bears retaliated with Cutler's four-yard touchdown pass to Forte. The Bears attempted another onside kick, but failed, and the Vikings later scored again on Zach Line's four-yard touchdown. With 1:50 left in the game, the Bears drove as far as the Vikings' 28-yard line, but time expired.

The loss dropped the Bears to 5–9 and officially eliminated them from playoff contention. Cutler's touchdown pass to Jeffery was his 200th career touchdown pass, while the onside kick attempted at the start of the third quarter was Gould's first successful kick in his eleven-year career with the Bears.

==== Week 16: at Tampa Bay Buccaneers ====
Week Sixteen: Chicago Bears at Tampa Bay Buccaneers – Game summary

Quarter	1	2	3	4	Total
**Bears**	0	13	0	13	**26**
Buccaneers	7	0	7	7	**21**

at Raymond James Stadium, Tampa, Florida

- Date: December 27
- Game time: 1:00 pm. EST/12:00 pm. CST
- Game weather: 83 °F (28 °C), cloudy
- Game attendance: 63,734
- Referee: Pete Morelli
- TV announcers (Fox): Sam Rosen, Matt Millen and Peter Schrager
- Recap, Gamebook

Game information

**First quarter**

- TB – Doug Martin 4-yard run, Connor Barth XP good, 6:27 (TB 7–0). **Drive: 1 play, 4 yards, 0:07**

**Second quarter**

- CHI – Ka'Deem Carey 1-yard run, Robbie Gould XP good, 11:35 (TIE 7–7). **Drive: 6 plays, 68 yards, 3:14**
- CHI – Robbie Gould 26-yard field goal, 3:00 (CHI 10–7). **Drive: 12 plays, 47 yards, 6:30**
- CHI – Robbie Gould 27-yard field goal, 0:08 (CHI 13–7). **Drive: 7 plays, 40 yards, 1:40**

**Third quarter**

- TB – Charles Sims 50-yard pass from Jameis Winston, Connor Barth XP good, 11:24 (TB 14–13). **Drive: 6 plays, 78 yards, 3:36**

**Fourth quarter**

- CHI – Ka'Deem Carey 1-yard pass from Jay Cutler, Robbie Gould XP good, 14:55 (CHI 21–14). **Drive: 5 plays, 23 yards, 2:40**
- CHI – Robbie Gould 50-yard field goal, 9:04 (CHI 24–14). **Drive: 10 plays, 40 yards, 4:18**
- CHI – Robbie Gould 39-yard field goal, 1:07 (CHI 27–14). **Drive: 10 plays, 37 yards, 5:21**
- TB – Austin Seferian-Jenkins 43-yard pass from Jameis Winston, Connor Barth XP good, 0:01 (CHI 27–21). **Drive: 6 plays, 80 yards, 1:06**

**Top passers**

- CHI – Jay Cutler, 20/27, 156 yards, 1 TD
- TB – Jameis Winston, 15/29, 292 yards, 2 TD, 1 INT

**Top rushers**

- CHI – Jeremy Langford, 19 carries, 83 yards
- TB – Doug Martin, 17 carries, 49 yards, 1 TD

**Top receivers**

- CHI – Zach Miller, 7 receptions, 69 yards
- TB – Mike Evans, 4 receptions, 64 yards

**Top tacklers**

- CHI – Christian Jones, John Timu, 4 tackles
- TB – Bradley McDougald, 10 tackles

The final road game of the season took place in week sixteen, when the Bears visited the Tampa Bay Buccaneers. In 55 all-time meetings, the Bears led the series 37–18, while also winning the most recent game in 2014 21–13 and the last game in Raymond James Stadium in 2005 by a score of 13–10. Jeff Joniak writes that the offense, taking on a defense guided by former Bears head coach Lovie Smith, had to "be patient", a philosophy that teams had used during Smith's tenure in Chicago; Smith's defenses force offenses to work with long series, followed by forcing a turnover. In 2015, the Bucs defense recorded 22 fumbles, 11 interceptions and 33 sacks, 7.5 of which are by defensive tackle Gerald McCoy. Another player that the Bucs defense featured was linebacker Lavonte David, who recorded 12 pass breakups, three interceptions, two sacks and a forced fumble in 2015. Tampa's defense also excelled in the run and passing games; in the former, the Bucs allowed the second-fewest average yards per carry with 3.3, while being ranked fifth in yards allowed after the catch. The Bucs also ranked eighth in yards per play. However, opposing quarterbacks were completing a league-high 69.2 percent of passes, while also throwing for a total of 28 touchdowns. The Bucs defense was also without linebacker Kwon Alexander, who ranked second in the team in tackles with 93, as he was suspended for drug use. On defense, the Bears took on rookie Jameis Winston, who recorded 3,422 passing yards and 20 touchdown passes in 2015. However, the Bucs receiving corps had 29 drops and a 7.9 drop percentage, the second-highest in the NFL. Chicago's run defense faced Doug Martin, who had averaged 5.1 yards per carry, 1,305 rushing yards and a league-best 2.4 yards per carry after contact. Alshon Jeffery, Bryce Callahan, Jacoby Glenn, Shea McClellin, Nick Becton, Tayo Fabuluje and Bruce Gaston were inactive.

The Bucs won the coin toss and deferred. The Bears opened the game with a hurry-up offense and gained a first down, but were eventually forced to punt. Tampa Bay also later punted, but regained the ball at the Bears' four-yard line after a blocked punt; Jeremiah George escaped LaRoy Reynolds to block Pat O'Donnell's punt and Howard Jones recovered. The Bucs converted the play into a four-yard touchdown run by Martin. Both teams later punted on their next drives, Jay Cutler's screen pass was deflected and intercepted by William Gholston, who returned the pick to the Bears' 15-yard line, but Jacquies Smith's facemask penalty nullified the play. Afterwards, Ka'Deem Carey scored on a one-yard touchdown run to tie the score. On Tampa's next drive, Martin was stripped by Harold Jones-Quartey, and the fumble was recovered by John Timu; the takeaway led to Robbie Gould's 26-yard field goal. The Bucs were later forced to punt again with two minutes left in the first half, and the Bears offense drove 40 yards to the nine, where Gould kicked a 27-yard field goal with eight seconds left. Winston kneeled to end the half. On the first drive of the second half, the Bucs scored when Winston threw a 50-yard touchdown pass to Charles Sims, who took advantage of Tracy Porter to score. Although the Bears punted on their next drive, they regained possession after Christian Jones and Lamarr Houston's blitz forced Winston to throw to Charles Sims, where Jones-Quartey pulled the ball away. The Bears eventually punted, but got the ball back when Pernell McPhee stripped Martin, with the fumble being recovered by Timu. On the first play of the fourth quarter, Cutler's play-action pass to Carey resulted in a one-yard touchdown. The Bucs punted on their next series, and Gould kicked a 50-yard field goal to increase the score to 23–14; Connor Barth later missed a 52-yard field goal wide left, leading to Gould's 39-yard field goal. With one second left in the game, Winston threw a 43-yard touchdown pass to Austin Seferian-Jenkins, and on the ensuing onside kick, Cameron Meredith recovered as time expired.

With the win, the Bears officially improved upon their 5–11 record from 2014. The three turnovers forced in the game was a best for the defense, while also tying the total in the last five games.

==== Week 17: vs. Detroit Lions ====
Week Seventeen: Detroit Lions at Chicago Bears – Game summary

Quarter	1	2	3	4	Total
**Lions**	7	3	7	7	**24**
Bears	0	0	10	10	**20**

at Soldier Field, Chicago, Illinois

- Date: January 3, 2016
- Game time: 12:00 pm. CST
- Game weather: 31 °F (−1 °C), cloudy
- Game attendance: 61,177
- Referee: John Hussey
- TV announcers (Fox): Joe Davis, Brady Quinn and Molly McGrath
- Recap, Gamebook

Game information

**First quarter**

- DET – Tim Wright 9-yard pass from Matthew Stafford, Matt Prater XP good, 10:14 (DET 7–0). **Drive: 9 plays, 77 yards, 4:46**

**Second quarter**

- DET – Matt Prater 59-yard field goal, 0:00 (DET 10–0). **Drive: 3 plays, -2 yards, 0:11**

**Third quarter**

- CHI – Robbie Gould 49-yard field goal, 9:03 (DET 10–3). **Drive: 10 plays, 52 5:57**
- CHI – Josh Bellamy 34-yard pass from Jay Cutler, Robbie Gould XP good, 5:28 (TIE 10–10). 'Drive: 3 plays, 41 yards, 1:22
- DET – Calvin Johnson 36-yard pass from Matthew Stafford, Matt Prater XP good, 1:07 (DET 17–10). **Drive: 8 plays, 72 yards, 4:21**

**Fourth quarter**

- CHI – Matt Forte 23-yard pass from Jay Cutler, Robbie Gould XP good, 13:20 (TIE 17–17). **Drive: 6 plays, 83 yards, 2:47**
- DET – Eric Ebron 1-yard pass from Matthew Stafford, Matt Prater XP good, 8:46 (DET 24–17). **Drive: 8 plays, 80 yards, 4:34**
- CHI – Robbie Gould 34-yard field goal, 5:39 (DET 24–20). **Drive: 7 plays, 37 yards, 3:07**

**Top passers**

- DET – Matthew Stafford, 28/39, 298 yards, 3 TD
- CHI – Jay Cutler, 17/23, 245 yards, 2 TD, 3 INT

**Top rushers**

- DET – Ameer Abdullah, 10 carries, 44 yards
- CHI – Matt Forte, 17 carries, 76 yards

**Top receivers**

- DET – Calvin Johnson, 10 receptions, 137 yards, 1 TD
- CHI – Marc Mariani, 6 receptions, 80 yards

**Top tacklers**

- DET – Stephen Tulloch, 7 tackles
- CHI – John Timu, 8 tackles

The Bears ended the regular season at home against the Lions; in Chicago, the Bears led the series 50–26–3. Jeff Joniak writes that the Bears offense had to hold off the blitz; in 2015, the Lions had 38 sacks, including 13.5 by defensive end Ezekiel Ansah, and ranked fourth in sack percentage, while recording the second-most negative plays in the NFL. In comparison, the Bears had the fewest negative plays in the league. Despite the frequency to blitz, the Lions only had eight sacks when doing so. Through the air, the Lions pass defense struggled, allowing a 30th-ranked passer rating of 101.7 and 30 touchdown passes while recording only interceptions. To excel, the Bears had to maintain the ball, as they were ranked sixth in the NFL in time of possession. On defense, the Bears took on a Lions offense that had improved under offensive coordinator Jim Bob Cooter after Joe Lombardi's firing, going from 18.6 points per game to 26.4 under Cooter. With Matthew Stafford, the Lions were one of eleven teams with over 4,000 yards, while also being ranked in the top ten with 30 touchdown passes. However, Stafford was sacked 40 times, while the rushing attack averaged only 84.5 yards per game and 3.8 yards per carry. Eddie Royal, Zach Miller, Hroniss Grasu, Jarvis Jenkins, Jacoby Glenn, Tayo Fabuluje and Terry Williams were inactive.

The Bears won the toss and elected to defer. On the first drive of the game, the Lions scored first when Harold Jones-Quartey slipped while covering and Stafford threw a nine-yard touchdown pass to Tim Wright. The Bears offense reached the Lions' five-yard line on their first possession, but Jay Cutler's pass to Cameron Meredith deflected off Nevin Lawson's helmet and was intercepted by James Ihedigbo. However, two consecutive sacks forced the Lions to punt. In the second quarter, after the Bears punted, Matt Prater attempted a 54-yard field goal, but missed wide right. The Bears eventually punted again, and the Lions reached the Bears' 35-yard line, but on 4th and 3, Stafford's pass for Calvin Johnson fell incomplete. Three plays later, the Lions regained possession of the ball when Ansah hit Cutler's arm as he threw to Marc Mariani, the pass being intercepted by Tahir Whitehead. Detroit converted the turnover into Prater's 59-yard field goal to end the first half. The Bears scored on their first drive of the second half with Robbie Gould's 49-yard field goal, and after Detroit punted, tied the score with Cutler's 34-yard touchdown pass to Josh Bellamy. Although the Lions scored with Stafford's 36-yard touchdown pass to Johnson, the Bears retaliated with Cutler's 23-yard score to Matt Forte; Detroit eventually responded with a one-yard touchdown by Eric Ebron. The Bears narrowed the score to 24–20 when Gould kicked a 34-yard field goal. The Lions punted again, and the Bears took over with 3:35 left in the game. Despite reaching the Lions' 37-yard line, Cutler was hit by Ansah while throwing to Deonte Thompson and was intercepted by Glover Quin. With less than two minutes left in the game, the Bears held the Lions to 3rd and 5, but Stafford's six-yard pass to Johnson gave the Lions a first down, where Stafford kneeled thrice to end the game.

Cutler threw multiple interceptions in a game for the first time in 2015, ending the game with three. Adding the two field goals from the game, Gould ended the season with 33 field goals, breaking his 2006 record for the most in franchise history by one.

== Standings ==
=== Division ===
NFC North
	W	L	T	PCT	DIV	CONF	PF	PA	STK
^{(3)} Minnesota Vikings	11	5	0	.688	5–1	8–4	365	302	W3
^{(5)} Green Bay Packers	10	6	0	.625	3–3	7–5	368	323	L2
Detroit Lions	7	9	0	.438	3–3	6–6	358	400	W3
Chicago Bears	6	10	0	.375	1–5	3–9	335	397	L1

=== Conference ===
NFC
#	Team	Division	W	L	T	PCT	DIV	CONF	SOS	SOV	STK
Division Leaders
1	Carolina Panthers	South	15	1	0	.938	5–1	11–1	.441	.438	W1
2	Arizona Cardinals	West	13	3	0	.813	4–2	10–2	.477	.457	L1
3	Minnesota Vikings	North	11	5	0	.688	5–1	8–4	.504	.449	W3
4	Washington Redskins	East	9	7	0	.563	4–2	8–4	.465	.403	W4
Wild Cards
5 (Note: Green Bay finished ahead of Seattle based on head-to-head victory.)	Green Bay Packers	North	10	6	0	.625	3–3	7–5	.531	.450	L2
6	Seattle Seahawks	West	10	6	0	.625	3–3	7–5	.520	.431	W1
Did not qualify for the postseason
7	Atlanta Falcons	South	8	8	0	.500	1–5	5–7	.480	.453	L1
8 (Note: St. Louis and Detroit finished ahead of Philadelphia and New Orleans based on conference record. St. Louis finished ahead of Detroit based on head-to-head victory. Detroit finished ahead of Philadelphia and New Orleans based on head-to-head sweep, while Philadelphia finished ahead of New Orleans based on head-to-head victory.)	St. Louis Rams	West	7	9	0	.438	4–2	6–6	.527	.482	L1
9	Detroit Lions	North	7	9	0	.438	3–3	6–6	.535	.429	W3
10	Philadelphia Eagles	East	7	9	0	.438	3–3	4–8	.508	.473	W1
11	New Orleans Saints	South	7	9	0	.438	3–3	5–7	.504	.402	W2
12 (Note: The New York Giants and Chicago each finished ahead of Tampa Bay based on head-to-head victory, while the Giants finished ahead of Chicago based on conference record.)	New York Giants	East	6	10	0	.375	2–4	4–8	.500	.396	L3
13	Chicago Bears	North	6	10	0	.375	1–5	3–9	.547	.469	L1
14	Tampa Bay Buccaneers	South	6	10	0	.375	3–3	5–7	.484	.406	L4
15	San Francisco 49ers	West	5	11	0	.313	1–5	4–8	.539	.463	W1
16	Dallas Cowboys	East	4	12	0	.250	3–3	3–9	.531	.438	L4
Tiebreakers (Note: When breaking ties for three or more teams under the NFL's rules, they are first broken within divisions, then comparing only the highest-ranked remaining team from each division.)

== Statistics ==
In comparison to their 2014 counterpart, the 2015 Bears were more competitive in games; in 2014, three of the worst losses were by 41, 28 and 21 points, while six of the 2015 team's losses were by less than a touchdown, two of which ended in overtime. The Bears ended the season 5–3 in away games, but won only once at home, the worst home record in team history. Additionally, the Bears were swept at home by division opponents for the first time since the NFL realignment in 2002.

The Bears struggled with injuries during the season; only four players started all sixteen games: Kyle Long, Matt Slauson, Adrian Amos and Kyle Fuller. In each of the sixteen games, there was a different starting lineup. Chicago's top four receivers (Alshon Jeffery, Kevin White, Eddie Royal and Marquess Wilson) missed a combined 35 of 64 games. Jeffery never played four consecutive games in 2015. Without the four, the Bears relied on Marc Mariani, Joshua Bellamy, Cameron Meredith and Deonte Thompson. Mariani recorded 22 receptions for 300 yards, while excelling on third down, recording eleven catches that resulted in first downs. Tight ends Martellus Bennett and Zach Miller missed games; the latter led the Bears in touchdowns with five. The offensive line also fell victim, with left guard Matt Slauson playing some games at center and right guard Kyle Long moving to tackle. The former alternated between guard and center during the season, playing weeks seven to nine and sixteen at center. At left tackle, second-year player Charles Leno Jr. started 13 games after taking over for an injured Jermon Bushrod.

The offense improved from 2014, progressing from 21st overall to 18th. The unit also recorded 5,514 total net yards and 344.6 per game. The passing attack improved from 28th in yards per play to 12th. On third down, Chicago ranked sixth in efficiency after converting 42.5 percent into first downs. With 21 turnovers allowed (13th in the NFL), the Bears had the fewest since the introduction of the 16-game schedule in 1978. Also, the Bears were able to score at least 30 points twice, after not doing so in 2014. In the first and third quarters, the Bears scored only 41 and 45 points, respectively, but scored 125 and 124 in the second and fourth. However, with 20.9 points per game, the Bears ranked 23rd in the NFL in the category, while also scoring only 24 touchdowns on 50 red zone attempts for a 48 percent red zone efficiency, 27th in the league.

The Bears defense vastly improved in comparison to the previous two seasons; after allowing the two most points in franchise history in 2013 (478) and 2014 (442), the 2015 defense allowed 397, which ranked 20th in the league. The defense gained 26 places in the pass defense category to end the season fourth in the ranking. While the unit also allowed only 225 passing yards per game, the number is skewed due to opposing offenses' frequency to run the ball; Bears opponents passed 512, the fourth-least in the NFL. Yardage-wise, the defense allowed an average of 345.1, gaining 16 spots to finish 14th. Statistically, the Bears allowed 7.5 yards per pass and a 62.9 completion percentage, 20th- and 14th-ranked in the league, respectively. The pass defense also allowed a passer rating of 99.2 passer rating (26th), 31 touchdowns (25th), while recording only eight interceptions, the second-least in the NFL. In total, the Bears forced only 17 turnovers (28th-ranked), failing to record one in seven games, and twice in only two games. In the red zone, the Bears allowed 27 touchdowns and 14 field goals on 45 attempts (60 percent), which ranked 21st in the league. Meanwhile, the pass rush recorded 35 sacks (22nd in the NFL), 20 of which occurred in the last seven games of the year, the seventh-most in the league. Christian Jones led the team in combined tackles with 87, while outside linebackers Lamarr Houston (8), Willie Young (6.5) and Pernell McPhee (6) recorded a combined 20.5 sacks, becoming one of only five defensive trios with at least six sacks per player in 2015.

Kicker Robbie Gould ended the season with 33 of 39 field goals converted for an 84.6 percentage, 19th in the league, while leading the Bears in scoring with 127 points. The 33 fields goals were the second-most in the NFL. Despite his consistency, Gould struggled during the later portion of the season, missing two field goals against the 49ers and a potential game-tying kick against the Redskins, with a combined two of five field goals converted in those two games. He was released before the 2016 season began. Pat O'Donnell punted 70 times for 3097 yards in 2015, 28 of which landed in the red zone with only four touchbacks. He ended the year with a net punting average of 39.6, the second-highest in team history since the stat began to be recorded in 1966. In his lone start with the Bears, Spencer Lanning punted three times for 156 yards with a net average of 35.7.

On punt returns, Marc Mariani averaged 6.6 yards on 29 attempts with his longest being a 20-yard return. The longest was a 65-yard touchdown by Bryce Callahan against the 49ers, which was eventually nullified by a holding penalty. The group ended the year with a 7.8-yard return average, 20th in the league. For kickoffs, the Bears finished with an average of 27 yards, which ranked third in the NFL. Mariani averaged 26.1 yards on 16 returns, while Deonte Thompson averaged 29.2 yards on 14 attempts, with his best being a 74-yard return. Thompson's average is the second-best in the league among players with at least ten attempts and the highest for a Bear since Devin Hester in 2010.

The kickoff team started the year on a sour note after allowing returns of 105 and 108 yards against the Cardinals and Seahawks, but was able to allow just one return of at least 40 yards in the next thirteen games, while also forcing opponents to return an average of 25.2 yards, which ranked 21st in the league. For the punting unit, despite allowing 64- and 65-yard returns against Seattle and Minnesota, opposing return teams recorded 7.5 yards, 14th in the NFL. Sherrick McManis led the special teams unit in tackles with eleven.

== Awards and records ==
On December 22, the rosters for the 2016 Pro Bowl were announced, with no Bears players making it for the first time since 1998. However, on January 14, 2016, Kyle Long was named as an alternate for Eagles lineman Jason Peters, marking his third consecutive Pro Bowl appearance. On January 7, Eddie Goldman and Adrian Amos were named to Mel Kiper Jr.'s All-Rookie Team and the Pro Football Writers of America's All-Rookie Team.

At the start of the season, Robbie Gould's first field goal marked the 244th of his career, surpassing Kevin Butler for the most in franchise history. By the end of the season, Gould set the all-time franchise record for most points scored (1,207), field goals (276) and field goals made from at least 50 yards (23), along with the most field goals in a season (33). Against the Chargers, Jay Cutler threw his 138th career touchdown pass to Martellus Bennett, breaking a tie with Sid Luckman; the record had stood since September 17, 1950.
