= 2016 Chicago Bears season =

NFL team season

- Owner: The McCaskey Family
- General manager: Ryan Pace
- Head coach: John Fox
- Home stadium: Soldier Field

Results
- Record: 3–13
- Division place: 4th NFC North
- Playoffs: Did not qualify
- All-Pros: None
- Pro Bowlers: Jordan Howard, RB; Josh Sitton, LG

Uniform
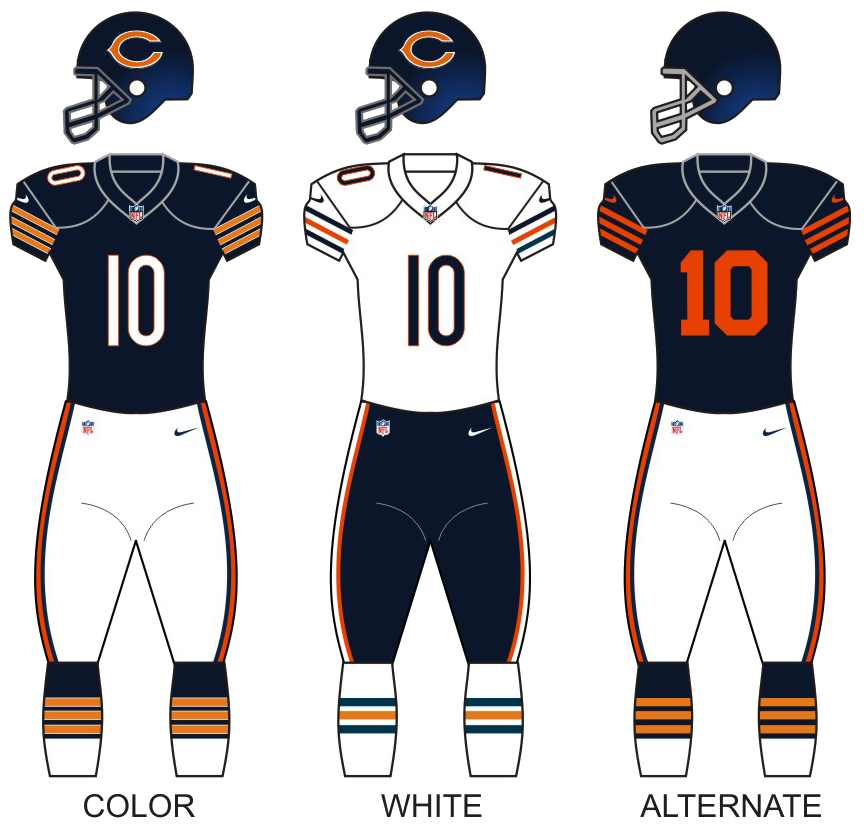

The 2016 season was the Chicago Bears' 97th in the National Football League (NFL) and their second under head coach John Fox. This was the Bears' first season since 2007 that Matt Forte was not on the opening day roster.

The Bears looked to improve upon their 6–10 record from 2015; however, they suffered a second consecutive 0–3 start and were plagued by injuries with an NFL-high 19 players on the injured reserve list by the end of the season. Multiple injuries to quarterback Jay Cutler resulted in backups Brian Hoyer and Matt Barkley playing much of the season. They finished with a 3–13 record, the worst record for the team since the NFL's move to 16-game seasons in 1978 and the second-worst record in franchise history after a 1–13 campaign in 1969. The Bears also went 0–8 on the road for the first time in franchise history. After the season, Cutler was released, and initially announced his retirement from the NFL, but he later signed with the Miami Dolphins.

== Offseason ==
=== Organizational changes ===
After only one season, offensive coordinator Adam Gase was hired as the new head coach of the Miami Dolphins on January 9, 2016. Two days later, quarterbacks coach Dowell Loggains was promoted to offensive coordinator. On January 22, Washington Redskins' offensive quality control coach Dave Ragone, who had been a former assistant of Loggains with the Tennessee Titans, was hired to fill the vacancy at quarterbacks coach. On February 12, the Bears hired former Rutgers' offensive coordinator Ben McDaniels as an offensive quality control coach.

On January 22, assistant special teams coach Derius Swinton joined the San Francisco 49ers as their special teams coordinator. Three days later, wide receivers coach Mike Groh left the team to become the wide receivers coach/passing game coordinator for the Los Angeles Rams, while assistant strength and conditioning coach Jim Arthur followed Gase to the Dolphins. 49ers' assistant special teams coach Richard Hightower was hired to replace Swinton on January 26. The wide receivers coach position was filled by former Tulane head coach Curtis Johnson on February 15.

=== Roster changes ===
Position	Player	Free agency tag	Date signed	2016 team
LB	Sam Acho	UFA	March 28	Chicago Bears
CB	Alan Ball	UFA	August 4	Arizona Cardinals
OT	Nick Becton	RFA	March 9	Chicago Bears
WR	Josh Bellamy	ERFA	April 18	Chicago Bears
G	Vladimir Ducasse	UFA	May 16	Baltimore Ravens
RB	Matt Forte	UFA	March 9	New York Jets
TE	Robert Housler	UFA	March 14	Chicago Bears
WR	Alshon Jeffery	UFA	March 8	Chicago Bears
DE	Jarvis Jenkins	UFA	March 16	New York Jets
LB	Shea McClellin	UFA	March 16	New England Patriots
CB	Sherrick McManis	UFA	March 10	Chicago Bears
WR	Marc Mariani	UFA	March 12	Chicago Bears
S	Sherrod Martin	UFA	–	–
TE	Zach Miller	UFA	March 14	Chicago Bears
C	Will Montgomery	UFA	–	–
S	Ryan Mundy	UFA	–	–
G	Patrick Omameh	RFA	June 2	Jacksonville Jaguars
CB	Tracy Porter	UFA	March 9	Chicago Bears
S	Chris Prosinski	UFA	March 25	Chicago Bears
LB	LaRoy Reynolds	RFA	March 16	Atlanta Falcons
RB	Jacquizz Rodgers	UFA	March 9	Chicago Bears
WR	Deonte Thompson	RFA	March 24	Chicago Bears
DT	Mitch Unrein	UFA	March 12	Chicago Bears
RFA: Restricted free agent, UFA: Unrestricted free agent, ERFA: Exclusive rights free agent

Free agency officially began on March 9.

==== Acquisitions ====
The first transactions of the year occurred shortly after the conclusion of the 2015 regular season on January 4, 2016, when the Bears signed cornerback De'Vante Bausby, quarterback Matt Blanchard, center Cornelius Edison, fullback Paul Lasike, wide receivers Marcus Lucas and Nathan Palmer, linebacker Danny Mason, tight end Gannon Sinclair and guard Martin Wallace to reserve/futures contracts. A week later, former Houston Texans' defensive end Keith Browner was also signed on a reserve/futures deal.

On the first day of free agency, the Bears signed a four-year contract with Denver Broncos linebacker Danny Trevathan and a three-year contract with Arizona Cardinals offensive tackle Bobby Massie. On March 12, inside linebacker Jerrell Freeman of the Indianapolis Colts signed a three-year contract. The next day, the Bears signed New England Patriots defensive lineman Akiem Hicks to a two-year deal. Three days later, Chicago signed Broncos long snapper Aaron Brewer to a one-year contract. Afterwards, the Bears began signing players to one-year deals; on March 30 and 31, two offensive linemen were signed: Bronco Manny Ramirez and Cardinal Ted Larsen. Also on March 31, a fourth Bronco was signed in defensive back and return specialist Omar Bolden. On April 30, the Bears agreed to sign former Texans quarterback Brian Hoyer. On June 2, the team signed former Carolina Panthers offensive tackle Nate Chandler. Two weeks later, Kansas City Chiefs tight end Tony Moeaki and Minnesota Vikings defensive lineman Marquis Jackson were signed. On July 3, Cleveland Browns quarterback Connor Shaw was claimed by the Bears off waivers. On July 20, the Bears signed former Carolina Panthers offensive lineman Amini Silatolu. On July 27, the Bears signed defensive back Brandon Boykin and wide receiver B.J. Daniels. On July 29, the Bears signed undrafted rookie offensive lineman Dan Buchholz. On August 3, the Bears signed defensive back Joel Ross after he was waived by the Tampa Bay Buccaneers on July 27. The next day, the Bears signed former Washington Redskin fullback Darrel Young. On August 4, 2016, the Bears signed linebacker Danny Mason and offensive lineman Garry Williams.

==== Departures ====
On February 16, the first departure of 2016 was left tackle Jermon Bushrod to the Miami Dolphins. On March 16, tight end Martellus Bennett, along with a sixth-round draft pick, was traded to the New England Patriots for a fourth-rounder. On May 1, safety Antrel Rolle and guard Matt Slauson were released. On June 1, offensive tackle Tayo Fabuluje was released, the first member of Ryan Pace's draftees to be released. On June 8, the Bears announced that center Manny Ramirez had retired. On July 22, safety Omar Bolden was released. On July 23, the Bears announced that offensive tackle Nate Chandler had retired. On July 29, the Bears released punter Ben LeCompte.

Of the Bears' unrestricted free agents, running back Matt Forte was the first to leave, signing with the New York Jets on March 9. A week later, on March 16, defensive end Jarvis Jenkins also joined the Jets, while linebackers Shea McClellin and LaRoy Reynolds signed with the Patriots and Atlanta Falcons, respectively. On June 2, offensive lineman Patrick Omameh signed with the Jacksonville Jaguars.

=== 2016 NFL draft ===
==== Pre-draft ====
Entering the draft, general consensus had the Bears' main need at linebacker; NFL.com draft analyst Lance Zierlein believed the Bears' priority was a pass rusher, while Bears ESPN.com writer Jeff Dickerson added quarterback as a need. Prior to the draft, the Bears held visits for 50 players; 25 had private visits, 14 players visited during the NFL Scouting Combine, 6 apiece met during the Senior Bowl and the East–West Shrine Game, 6 had private workouts, while 2 had local visits. Of the 50, 11 had met with the team on multiple occasions.

==== Draft ====
The Bears used their first-round draft pick to select Georgia linebacker Leonard Floyd. At Georgia, Floyd led the team in sacks during his final season with 4.5, while also recording a team-high 10.5 tackles for loss. On the second day of the draft, Chicago selected Kansas State offensive lineman Cody Whitehair, who started all four years at the school and was a first-team All-Big 12 Conference member in 2015, and defensive lineman Jonathan Bullard of Florida, who recorded 17.5 tackles for loss in 2015, the most for a Gator since former Bear Alex Brown's 18 in 1999. With the three fourth-round draft picks, the Bears selected West Virginia linebacker Nick Kwiatkoski, who led the Mountaineers in tackles during the previous three seasons, including 80 tackles and three sacks in 2015; Miami safety Deon Bush, who recorded 50 tackles, six pass breakups, two fumble recoveries, a sack and an interception in 2015; and Northern Iowa cornerback Deiondre' Hall, who recorded 28 pass breakups, 13 interceptions, six pick-sixes and four forced fumbles, three of which came last season. In the fifth round, the Bears drafted Indiana running back Jordan Howard, who was one of three running backs in school history to record 1,000 yards in a season in two years, while also recording 1,213 yards and nine touchdowns in 2015 despite a knee injury. In the following round, William & Mary safety DeAndre Houston-Carson was selected; the third player in team history to earn consensus All-American honors, Houston-Carson recorded 293 tackles, 10 interceptions and nine blocked field goals. With the final pick in the draft, the Bears selected Western Michigan receiver Daniel Braverman, who ranked second in the country with 109 receptions, 1,367 yards and 13 touchdowns.

2016 Chicago Bears draft
Round	Pick	Player	Position	College	Notes
1	9	Leonard Floyd	OLB	Georgia	From Buccaneers
2	56	Cody Whitehair *	G	Kansas State	From Seahawks
3	72	Jonathan Bullard	DE	Florida	
4	113	Nick Kwiatkoski	ILB	West Virginia	From Rams
4	124	Deon Bush	S	Miami (FL)	From Seahawks
4	127	Deiondre' Hall	CB	Northern Iowa	From Patriots
5	150	Jordan Howard *	RB	Indiana	
6	185	DeAndre Houston-Carson	S	William & Mary	
7	230	Daniel Braverman	WR	Western Michigan	
Made roster † Pro Football Hall of Fame * Made at least one Pro Bowl during career

Notes

- The Bears acquired two additional sixth-round selections (Nos. 204 and 206 overall) – one in a trade that sent defensive end Jared Allen to the Carolina Panthers, the other in a trade that sent Jon Bostic to the New England Patriots. The Bears later traded one of the extra sixth-round selections (No. 204 overall) along with Martellus Bennett back to the Patriots in exchange for the Patriots' fourth-round selection (No. 127 overall).
- The Bears traded their first-round selection (No. 11 overall) and their fourth-round selection (No. 106 overall) to the Tampa Bay Buccaneers for their first-round selection (No. 9 overall).
- The Bears traded their second-round selection (No. 41 overall) to the Buffalo Bills for second- and fourth-round selections (No. 49 and No. 117 overall) and a fourth-round selection in the 2017 NFL draft. The Bears then traded the newly acquired 49th pick to the Seattle Seahawks for second- and fourth-round selections (No. 56 and No. 124 overall).
- The Bears traded a fourth-round selection (No. 117 overall) and a sixth-round selection (No. 206 overall) to the Los Angeles Rams for a fourth-round selection (No. 113 overall).

==== Undrafted free agents ====
After the draft, the Bears signed the following undrafted free agents:

Position	Player	College
OT	Adrian Bellard	Texas State
TE	Ben Braunecker	Harvard
G	Dan Buchholz	Duquesne
CB	Taveze Calhoun	Mississippi State
LB	Don Cherry	Villanova
KR	Derek Keaton	Georgia Southern
OT	John Kling	Buffalo
DE	Nate Meier	Iowa
WR	Darrin Peterson	Liberty
CB	Kevin Peterson	Oklahoma State
DE	Roy Robertson-Harris	UTEP
TE	Joe Sommers	Wisconsin-Oshkosh

=== Offseason activities ===
From May 14–15, the Bears hosted a Rookie Minicamp. Afterwards, they signed UConn defensive lineman Kenton Adeyemi, CSU Pueblo receiver Kieren Duncan and North Dakota State punter Ben LeCompte and Louisiana–Lafayette offensive lineman Donovan Williams. To relieve space on the roster for the rookies, defensive lineman Bruce Gaston, Marcus Lucas, Nathan Palmer and Dan Buchholz were released. On May 25, Notre Dame linebacker and undrafted rookie Jarrett Grace was signed, while Danny Mason was released. On June 10, Dartmouth quarterback Dalyn Williams was signed, with Matt Blanchard being released. On July 22, the Bears signed cornerback Charles Tillman to a one-day contract, letting him end his 13-year career as a Bear. On June 27, outside linebacker Pernell McPhee was placed on the physically-unable-to-perform list (PUP) while recovering from knee surgery. On July 30, the Bears signed linebacker Willie Young to a two-year extension, keeping him in Chicago until 2018. On August 8, center Hroniss Grasu was placed on injured reserve with a torn ACL. Two days later, offensive tackle Nick Becton was released and former Pittsburgh Steelers tackle Mike Adams was signed.

Bears Training Camp was held at Olivet Nazarene University in Bourbonnais from July 27–August 9. The team hosted the Family Fest at Soldier Field on August 6, while participating in joint practices with the New England Patriots at Gillette Stadium from August 15–17.

== Staff ==
2016 Chicago Bears staff
Front office: Secretary of the board of directors – Virginia Halas McCaskey; Chairman – George McCaskey; President/CEO – Ted Phillips; General manager – Ryan Pace; Vice-president & General Counsel – Cliff Stein; Director of player personnel – Josh Lucas; Director of college scouting – Mark Sadowski; Director of pro personnel – Champ Kelly; Director of football administration – Joey Laine; Head coaches: Head coach – John Fox; Offensive coaches: Offensive coordinator – Dowell Loggains; Quarterbacks – Dave Ragone; Running backs – Stan Drayton; Wide receivers – Curtis Johnson; Tight ends – Frank Smith; Offensive line – Dave Magazu; Assistant offensive line – Kevin Mawae; Assistant offensive line – Ben Wilkerson; Offensive assistant – Ben McDaniels; Offensive quality control – John Dunn	Defensive coaches: Defensive coordinator – Vic Fangio; Defensive line – Jay Rodgers; Linebackers – Glenn Pires; Outside linebackers – Clint Hurtt; Defensive backs – Ed Donatell; Assistant defensive backs – Sam Garnes; Defensive quality control – Sean Desai; Special teams coaches: Special teams coordinator – Jeff Rodgers; Assistant special teams – Richard Hightower; Strength and conditioning: Strength and conditioning – Jason George; Assistant strength and conditioning – Pierre Ngo; Assistant strength and conditioning – Rick Perry

== Final roster ==
2016 Chicago Bears roster
Quarterbacks (QB): 12 Matt Barkley; 9 David Fales; Running backs (RB): 45 Bralon Addison; 25 Ka'Deem Carey; 24 Jordan Howard; 33 Jeremy Langford; 47 Paul Lasike FB; Wide receivers (WR): 11 Josh Bellamy; 83 Daniel Braverman; 17 Alshon Jeffery; 81 Cameron Meredith; 14 Deonte Thompson; Tight ends (TE): 84 Ben Braunecker; 85 Daniel Brown; 82 Logan Paulsen; 80 MyCole Pruitt	Offensive linemen (OL): 64 Eric Kush G; 62 Ted Larsen G; 72 Charles Leno T; 70 Bobby Massie T; 68 Matt McCants T; 71 Josh Sitton G; 65 Cody Whitehair C; Defensive linemen (DL): 74 Jonathan Bullard DE; 96 Akiem Hicks DE; 98 Mitch Unrein DE; 90 Cornelius Washington DE; 69 C. J. Wilson NT	Linebackers (LB): 49 Sam Acho OLB; 58 Jonathan Anderson ILB; 94 Leonard Floyd OLB; 50 Jerrell Freeman ILB; 52 Christian Jones OLB; 44 Nick Kwiatkoski ILB; 92 Pernell McPhee OLB; 46 Josh Shirley OLB; 53 John Timu ILB; 97 Willie Young OLB; Defensive backs (DB): 38 Adrian Amos FS; 35 Johnthan Banks CB; 26 Deon Bush S; 37 Bryce Callahan CB; 32 Deiondre' Hall CB; 36 DeAndre Houston-Carson FS; 30 Demontre Hurst CB; 29 Harold Jones-Quartey SS; 22 Cre'Von LeBlanc CB; 27 Sherrick McManis CB; 21 Tracy Porter CB; 31 Chris Prosinski SS; Special teams (ST): 4 Connor Barth K; 16 Pat O'Donnell P; 48 Patrick Scales LS	Practice squad: 18 Dres Anderson WR; 88 Rory Anderson TE (IR); 20 De'Vante Bausby CB; 43 David Cobb RB; 60 Cornelius Edison C; 39 Jacoby Glenn CB; 79 Lawrence Okoye DE; 87 Justin Perillo TE (IR); 78 Will Poehls T; 43 Rashaad Reynolds CB; 73 Cyril Richardson G; Reserve: 76 Mike Adams T (IR); -- Nick Becton T (IR); -- Brandon Boykin CB (IR); 6 Jay Cutler QB (IR); 95 Ego Ferguson DE (IR); 23 Kyle Fuller CB (IR); 91 Eddie Goldman NT (IR); 55 Hroniss Grasu C (IR); 99 Lamarr Houston OLB (IR); 2 Brian Hoyer QB (IR); 75 Kyle Long G (IR); 43 Danny Mason ILB (IR); 86 Zach Miller TE (IR); 45 Roy Robertson-Harris DE (NF-Ill.); 19 Eddie Royal WR (IR); 8 Connor Shaw QB (IR); 93 Will Sutton NT (IR); 59 Danny Trevathan ILB (IR); 13 Kevin White WR (IR); 10 Marquess Wilson WR (IR); Rookies in italics 53 active, 22 reserve, 9 practice squad

== Preseason ==
=== Transactions ===
Preseason roster changes

Additions

- On August 13, the Bears signed Khaled Holmes and Shelley Smith.
- On September 4, the Bears signed Logan Paulsen and Josh Sitton, and was awarded Eric Kush and Cre'Von LeBlanc off waivers.
- On September 5, the Bears signed Connor Barth and Patrick Scales.

Departures

- On August 13, the Bears released Dan Buchholz and Donovan Williams.
- On August 28, the Bears released Darrel Young, Keith Browner, Kieran Duncan, Derek Keaton, John Kling, Senorise Perry, Darrin Peterson, Joel Ross, Gannon Sinclair and Martin Wallace.
- On August 30, the Bears released Jarrett Grace.
- On September 3, the Bears released De'Vante Bausby, Ben Braunecker, Daniel Braverman, Taveze Calhoun, B. J. Daniels, David Fales, Khaled Holmes, Kevin Peterson, Patrick Scales, John Timu, Jason Weaver, Terry Willians, Rob Housler, Marc Mariani, Tony Moeaki, Jacquizz Rodgers, Shelley Smith and Garry Williams.
- On September 4, the Bears released Cornelius Edison, Demontre Hurst, Khari Lee, Robbie Gould, Aaron Brewer and Amini Silatolu.

Reserve lists

- On August 30, the Bears placed Lamin Barrow on the waived/injured list, Hroniss Grasu and Connor Shaw on the injured reserve list, and Roy Robertson-Harris on the reserve/non-football illness list.
- On September 3, the Bears placed Ego Ferguson and Danny Mason on the waived/injured list, and Pernell McPhee and Marquess Wilson on reserve/physically unable to perform list.

Practice squad additions

- On September 4, the Bears added De'Vante Bausby, Ben Braunecker, Daniel Braverman, John Timu and Jason Weaver to the practice squad, while adding Senorise Perry as a practice squad exception.
- On September 5, the Bears added Matt Barkley, Demontre Hurst and Cornelius Edison to the practice squad.
- On September 7, the Bears added Laurence Gibson to the practice squad.

=== Schedule ===
The Bears' preseason opponents and schedule was announced on April 7. The schedule featured three games against 2015 playoff teams; the first game was against the defending Super Bowl champion Denver Broncos, followed by the AFC East winner New England Patriots, the Kansas City Chiefs, and ending with frequent preseason opponent Cleveland Browns.

Week	Date	Opponent	Result	Record	Game site	Game book	NFL.com recap
1	August 11	Denver Broncos	L 0–22	0–1	Soldier Field	Game book	Recap
2	August 18	at New England Patriots	L 22–23	0–2	Gillette Stadium	Game book	Recap
3	August 27	Kansas City Chiefs	L 7–23	0–3	Soldier Field	Game book	Recap
4	September 1	at Cleveland Browns	W 21–7	1–3	FirstEnergy Stadium	Game book	Recap

=== Game summaries ===
In the preseason opener against the Broncos, the Bears fell behind early when Mark Sanchez threw a 32-yard touchdown pass to Demaryius Thomas, who beat cornerback Bryce Callahan for the score. Although the Bears punted on their first drive, they regained possession of the ball when Callahan tipped Sanchez's pass towards Jerrell Freeman, who intercepted the ball. Despite this, the Bears were unable to score and punted. The Broncos extended their lead with Brandon McManus' 37-yard field goal; after scoring another three points on a 44-yard field goal, Denver continued to increase the margin when Bennie Fowler blocked Pat O'Donnell's punt and Zaire Anderson recovered in the endzone. The Broncos got the ball back on the next drive when Lorenzo Doss intercepted Brian Hoyer, and came close to scoring once again on McManus' 48-yard field goal, but Chris Prosinski blocked the kick. In the second half, David Fales was sacked by Dekoda Watson in the endzone for a safety, making the score 22–0. Aside from McManus missing a 46-yard field goal, every drive in the second half ended with a punt. The loss marked the first time the Bears were shut out in a preseason game since a 13–0 loss in 1981 to the Kansas City Chiefs.

In New England, the Bears' starting offense scored on its first two drives: Robbie Gould kicked a 36-yard field goal, while Jeremy Langford scored on a five-yard touchdown run, which led to Jay Cutler's pass to Rob Housler for the two-point conversion. The Patriots attempted to respond when they reached the Bears' three-yard line, but Tracy Porter forced Brandon Bolden to fumble, leading to the Bears recovering the loose ball. After the Bears punted, the Patriots scored on Stephen Gostkowski's 21-yard field goal. On the Bears' first play of their next series, Cyrus Jones intercepted Brian Hoyer's pass for Josh Bellamy, which set up LeGarrette Blount's one-yard touchdown run, though Keith Browner stopped Blount on the potential game-tying two-point conversion. The Patriots took the lead on their next possession when Jimmy Garoppolo threw a 16-yard touchdown pass to A. J. Derby, followed by a two-point conversion scored by Chris Hogan. In the second half New England scored two more field goals of 29 and 44 yards to make the score 23–11. Gould kicked a 36-yard field goal to close the margin; Connor Shaw replaced Hoyer for the final drive, throwing a 22-yard touchdown pass to B. J. Daniels as time expired. Shaw later scored on the two-point conversion with a pass to Darrin Peterson to end the game with a one-point margin.

The Bears struggled against the Chiefs, allowing 23 unanswered points: Cairo Santos' 20- and 28-yard field goals and Spencer Ware's one-yard touchdown run in the second quarter, followed by Darrin Reaves' four-yard touchdown in the third and Santos' 41-yard field goal early in the fourth. Chicago had two opportunities during the second half, but Gould missed a 48-yard field goal wide left and the offense was unable to capitalize on Deiondre' Hall's interception of Aaron Murray, turning the ball on downs. With 5:40 left in the game, Shaw threw a 16-yard touchdown pas to Cameron Meredith for the Bears' first score of the game, but Shaw would be injured on Chicago's next drive when Rakeem Nuñez-Roches landed on his left foot, breaking his leg. Shaw was placed on injured reserve on August 30.

Receiver Kevin White was the only starter on the Bears' regular-season depth chart to start the preseason closer against the Browns. The Bears scored first on Gould's 50-yard field goal. The Browns were forced to punt on the next drive, but Daniels muffed it after the ball hit his foot while he was jumping over De'Vante Bausby. Cleveland took the lead with Isaiah Crowell's four-yard touchdown run on the following drive. Although the Bears reclaimed the lead with Ka'Deem Carey's one-yard touchdown run, Gould missed the extra point wide left. Two drives later, Josh McCown was intercepted by Jacoby Glenn, leading to Gould's 43-yard field goal. The Browns attempted to respond with a field goal of their own, but Patrick Murray missed his 31-yard attempt wide right. Gould kicked a 21-yard field goal in the third quarter to make the score 15–7. In the fourth quarter, Jordan Howard scored on a 16-yard touchdown run, though Gould's extra point was blocked. Gould was released on September 4.

== Transactions ==
Regular season roster changes

Additions

- On September 21, the Bears elevated Raheem Mostert and Matt Barkley to the active roster.
- On September 27, the Bears signed C. J. Wilson and Joique Bell, and elevated John Timu to the active roster.
- On October 1, the Bears elevated Ben Braunecker to the active roster.
- On October 3, the Bears signed C. J. Wilson.
- On October 9, the Bears elevated Demontre Hurst to the active roster.
- On October 10, the Bears elevated De'Vante Bausby to the active roster.
- On October 20, the Bears elevated Pernell McPhee to the active roster.
- On October 24, the Bears signed Daniel Brown and elevated Cornelius Edison to the active roster.
- On October 25, the Bears elevated Demontre Hurst to the active roster.
- On November 12, the Bears elevated Paul Lasike to the active roster.
- On November 15, the Bears activated Marquess Wilson from the physically unable to perform list, signed C. J. Wilson and elevated Cornelius Edison to the active roster.
- On November 19, the Bears elevated Jimmy Staten to the active roster.
- On November 22, the Bears signed De'Vante Bausby.
- On November 23, the Bears elevated Jonathan Anderson to the active roster and signed David Fales.
- On November 29, the Bears elevated Daniel Braverman to the active roster.
- On December 12, the Bears signed Matt McCants.
- On December 13, the Bears signed MyCole Pruitt.
- On December 17, the Bears activated Alshon Jeffery from the exempt/commissioner permission list.
- On December 20, the Bears elevated Bralon Addison to the active roster.
- On December 17, the Bears activated Jerrell Freeman from the exempt/commissioner permission list.
- On December 31, the Bears elevated Josh Shirley to the active roster.

Departures

- On September 20, the Bears released Paul Lasike.
- On September 27, the Bears released Jonathan Anderson and Greg Scruggs.
- On October 1, the Bears released C. J. Wilson.
- On October 3, the Bears released Raheem Mostert.
- On October 8, the Bears released C. J. Wilson.
- On October 10, the Bears released Demontre Hurst.
- On October 20, the Bears released Paul Lasike.
- On October 24, the Bears released Joique Bell.
- On October 25, the Bears released Marcel Jensen and Jacoby Glenn.
- On November 8, the Bears released Cornelius Edison.
- On November 9, the Bears released Colin Kelly.
- On November 19, the Bears released De'Vante Bausby.
- On November 21, the Bears released Jimmy Staten.
- On December 5, the Bears released Lamin Barrow.
- On December 13, the Bears released De'Vante Bausby.
- On December 20, the Bears released Cornelius Edison.
- On December 26, the Bears released Cornelius Edison.

Reserve lists

- On September 21, the Bears placed Lamarr Houston on the injured reserve list.
- On September 27, the Bears placed Kyle Fuller on the injured reserve list.
- On October 5, the Bears placed Kevin White on the injured reserve list.
- On October 10, the Bears placed Busta Anderson on the practice squad injured list.
- On October 21, the Bears placed Raheem Mostert on the practice squad injured list.
- On October 24, the Bears placed Brian Hoyer on the injured reserve list.
- On November 14, the Bears placed Alshon Jeffery on the reserve/suspended by commissioner list.
- On November 15, the Bears placed Kyle Long and Will Sutton on the injured reserve list.
- On November 21, the Bears placed Jerrell Freeman on the reserve/suspended by commissioner list.
- On November 23, the Bears placed Zach Miller on the injured reserve list.
- On December 5, the Bears placed Jay Cutler on the injured reserve list.
- On December 12, the Bears placed Mike Adams on the injured reserve list.
- On December 17, the Bears placed Marquess Wilson on the injured reserve list.
- On December 20, the Bears placed Eddie Royal on the injured reserve list..
- On December 23, the Bears placed Eddie Goldman on the injured reserve list.

Practice squad additions

- On September 13, the Bears added Raheem Mostert to the practice squad.
- On September 14, the Bears added Jimmy Staten to the practice squad.
- On September 21, the Bears added Ronald Powell and Paul Lasike to the practice squad.
- On September 26, the Bears added Colin Kelly to the practice squad.
- On October 4, the Bears added Raheem Mostert to the practice squad.
- On October 5, the Bears added Busta Anderson to the practice squad.
- On October 10, the Bears added Darius Jennings and Marcel Jensen to the practice squad.
- On October 11, the Bears added Demontre Hurst to the practice squad.
- On October 21, the Bears added Paul Lasike to the practice squad.
- On October 24, the Bears added Arturo Uzdavinis to the practice squad.
- On October 25, the Bears added David Cobb to the practice squad.
- On October 26, the Bears added Jacoby Glenn to the practice squad.
- On November 2, the Bears added William Poehls to the practice squad.
- On November 9, the Bears added Cornelius Edison to the practice squad.
- On November 15, the Bears added Josh Woodrum and Cyril Richardson to the practice squad.
- On November 22, the Bears added Dres Anderson to the practice squad.
- On November 23, the Bears added Lawrence Okoye and Jimmy Staten to the practice squad.
- On November 29, the Bears added Justin Perillo to the practice squad.
- On December 14, the Bears added De'Vante Bausby and Josh Shirley to the practice squad.
- On December 21, the Bears added Cornelius Edison to the practice squad.
- On December 28, the Bears added Cornelius Edison and Rashaad Reynolds to the practice squad.

Practice squad departures

- On September 13, the Bears removed Laurence Gibson and Senorise Perry from the practice squad.
- On September 26, the Bears removed Jason Weaver from the practice squad.
- On November 1, the Bears removed Arturo Uzdavinis from the practice squad.
- On November 22, the Bears removed Darius Jennings from the practice squad.
- On December 5, the Bears removed Josh Woodrum from the practice squad.
- On December 13, Ronald Powell was signed by the Seattle Seahawks.
- On December 27, the Bears removed Jimmy Staten from the practice squad.

== Regular season ==
The schedule was released on April 14. The Bears' opponents had a combined 2015 record of 118–138 (.461), giving the Bears the second-softest schedule in the league.

Week	Date	Opponent	Result	Record	Game site	Game book	NFL.com recap
1	September 11	at Houston Texans	**L** 14–23	0–1	NRG Stadium	Game book	Recap
2	September 19	Philadelphia Eagles	**L** 14–29	0–2	Soldier Field	Game book	Recap
3	September 25	at Dallas Cowboys	**L** 17–31	0–3	AT&T Stadium	Game book	Recap
4	October 2	**Detroit Lions**	**W** 17–14	1–3	Soldier Field	Game book	Recap
5	October 9	at Indianapolis Colts	**L** 23–29	1–4	Lucas Oil Stadium	Game book	Recap
6	October 16	Jacksonville Jaguars	**L** 16–17	1–5	Soldier Field	Game book	Recap
7	October 20	at **Green Bay Packers**	**L** 10–26	1–6	Lambeau Field	Game book	Recap
8	October 31	**Minnesota Vikings**	**W** 20–10	2–6	Soldier Field	Game book	Recap
9	Bye						
10	November 13	at Tampa Bay Buccaneers	**L** 10–36	2–7	Raymond James Stadium	Game book	Recap
11	November 20	at New York Giants	**L** 16–22	2–8	MetLife Stadium	Game book	Recap
12	November 27	Tennessee Titans	**L** 21–27	2–9	Soldier Field	Game book	Recap
13	December 4	San Francisco 49ers	**W** 26–6	3–9	Soldier Field	Game book	Recap
14	December 11	at **Detroit Lions**	**L** 17–20	3–10	Ford Field	Game book	Recap
15	December 18	**Green Bay Packers**	**L** 27–30	3–11	Soldier Field	Game book	Recap
16	December 24	Washington Redskins	**L** 21–41	3–12	Soldier Field	Game book	Recap
17	January 1	at **Minnesota Vikings**	**L** 10–38	3–13	U.S. Bank Stadium	Game book	Recap
Note: Intra-division opponents are in **bold** text. Legend # Games played with color uniforms. # Games played with white uniforms. # Games played with 1940s throwback uniforms. – Light green background indicates a victory. – Light red background indicates a loss. Note: The Bears' Color Rush uniforms for the Week 7 Thursday Night game at the Green Bay Packers was unveiled on September 13, 2016. The team wore navy blue pants with their standard navy jerseys.

=== Game summaries ===
==== Week 1: at Houston Texans ====
Week One: Chicago Bears at Houston Texans – Game summary

Quarter	1	2	3	4	Total
Bears	7	7	0	0	**14**
**Texans**	0	10	3	10	**23**

at NRG Stadium, Houston, Texas

- Date: September 11
- Game time: 12:00 p.m. CDT
- Game weather: Played indoors (retractable roof closed)
- Game attendance: 71,933
- Referee: Pete Morelli
- TV announcers (Fox): Thom Brennaman, Charles Davis and Peter Schrager
- Recap, Game book

Game information

**First quarter**

- CHI – Jeremy Langford 1-yard run (Connor Barth kick), 6:58. Bears 7–0. **Drive: 8 plays, 75 yards, 4:31.**

**Second quarter**

- HOU – Nick Novak 28-yard field goal, 11:25. Bears 7–3. **Drive: 14 plays, 59 yards, 6:19.**
- HOU – DeAndre Hopkins 23-yard pass from Brock Osweiler (Nick Novak kick), 3:14. Texans 10–7. **Drive: 10 plays, 61 yards, 4:49.**
- CHI – Eddie Royal 19-yard pass from Jay Cutler (Connor Barth kick), 0:07. Bears 14–10. **Drive: 3 plays, 75 yards, 0:31.**

**Third quarter**

- HOU – Nick Novak 28-yard field goal, 12:17. Bears 14–13. **Drive: 5 plays, 15 yards, 1:50.**

**Fourth quarter**

- HOU – Will Fuller 18-yard pass from Brock Osweiler (Nick Novak kick), 12:44. Texans 20–14. **Drive: 9 plays, 64 yards, 4:52.**
- HOU – Nick Novak 38-yard field goal, 6:10. Texans 23–14. **Drive: 7 plays, 46 yards, 2:51.**

**Top passers**

- CHI – Jay Cutler – 16/29, 216 yards, TD, INT
- HOU – Brock Osweiler – 22/35, 231 yards, 2 TD, INT

**Top rushers**

- CHI – Jeremy Langford – 17 rushes, 57 yards, TD
- HOU – Lamar Miller – 28 rushes, 106 yards

**Top receivers**

- CHI – Alshon Jeffery – 4 receptions, 105 yards
- HOU – Will Fuller – 5 receptions, 107 yards, TD

The Bears opened the 2016 season on the road against the Houston Texans, who defeated the Bears in all three of their previous meetings, most recently a 13–6 win in 2012. The game was the second Bears–Texans game at NRG Stadium, the first being a Houston 31–24 win in 2008. On offense, the Bears faced a Texans defense that was ranked third in the NFL in 2015, which WBBM-TV writer Jeff Joniak wrote should be handled by controlling the ball and blocking defenders J. J. Watt, Whitney Mercilus and Jadeveon Clowney. Meanwhile, the Texans were led by quarterback Brock Osweiler, who guided the Broncos to victory against the Bears in his debut as an NFL starter last year. Osweiler was bolstered by a fast-paced receiving corps featuring DeAndre Hopkins and rookies Will Fuller and Braxton Miller. With an unproven roster, including six new starters on offense, Joniak believed the Bears should utilize this as an "element of surprise" against the Texans.

On their opening drive, the Texans reached the Bears' 34-yard line, but had their drive end when Tracy Porter pulled the ball away from Hopkins for the interception; Chicago capitalized on the takeaway with Jeremy Langford's one-yard touchdown run. After the Texans punted, the Bears elected to attempt a fourth down conversion at Houston's 31-yard line, but turned the ball over on downs when Jay Cutler fumbled the snap. Nick Novak kicked a 28-yard field goal in the second quarter. The Texans took the lead when Osweiler threw a 23-yard touchdown pass to Hopkins, and had a chance to increase the margin when Osweiler threw a potential 83-yard touchdown pass to Fuller, but he dropped the pass; they punted three plays later. With 31 seconds left in the half, the Bears offense traveled 75 yards on three plays, including a 54-yard pass by Cutler to Alshon Jeffery, ending the drive with Cutler's 19-yard touchdown pass to Eddie Royal. On the second play of the third quarter, Cutler was intercepted by Andre Hal after Kevin White appeared to stop running his route midplay. Novak kicked a 28-yard field goal on the resulting drive. The next five drives of the game ended in punts, ending early in the fourth quarter when Fuller converted a screen pass into an 18-yard touchdown. The Texans increased the score to 23–14 via Novak's 38-yard kick. The Bears were unable to enter Houston territory on their final two drives.

In comparison to the first half, the Bears offense struggled in the second; despite recording five first downs on their opening drive and a 75-yard series in the second quarter, the unit had just 71 yards and four first downs in the final two-quarters. Cutler was sacked five times, including thrice after the Texans took the 20–14 lead.

==== Week 2: vs. Philadelphia Eagles ====
Week Two: Philadelphia Eagles at Chicago Bears – Game summary

Quarter	1	2	3	4	Total
**Eagles**	3	6	13	7	**29**
Bears	0	7	0	7	**14**

at Soldier Field, Chicago, Illinois

- Date: September 19
- Game time: 7:30 pm. CDT
- Game weather: 84 °F (29 °C), mostly cloudy
- Game attendance: 62,268
- Referee: Jeff Triplette
- TV announcers (ESPN): Sean McDonough, Jon Gruden and Lisa Salters
- Recap, Game book

Game information

**First quarter**

- PHI – Caleb Sturgis 25-yard field goal, 6:11. Eagles 3–0. **Drive: 13 plays, 47 yards, 7:26.**

**Second quarter**

- CHI – Jeremy Langford 1-yard run (Connor Barth kick), 11:16. Bears 7–3. **Drive: 6 plays, 65 yards, 3:44.**
- PHI – Caleb Sturgis 29-yard field goal, 2:27. Bears 7–6. **Drive: 11 plays, 77 yards, 5:11.**
- PHI – Caleb Sturgis 53-yard field goal, 0:03. Eagles 9–7. **Drive: 8 plays, 38 yards, 1:35.**

**Third quarter**

- PHI – Ryan Mathews 3-yard run (Caleb Sturgis kick), 0:53. Eagles 16–7. **Drive: 8 plays, 68 yards, 4:31.**
- PHI – Trey Burton 2-yard pass from Carson Wentz (kick failed, hit left upright), 0:32. Eagles 22–7. **Drive: 1 play, 2 yards, 0:04.**

**Fourth quarter**

- PHI – Ryan Mathews 1-yard run (Caleb Sturgis kick), 10:36. Eagles 29–7. **Drive: 6 plays, 46 yards, 3:05.**
- CHI – Eddie Royal 65-yard punt return (Connor Barth kick), 5:09. Eagles 29–14.

**Top passers**

- PHI – Carson Wentz – 20/33, 183 yards, TD
- CHI – Jay Cutler – 12/17, 157 yards, INT

**Top rushers**

- PHI – Darren Sproles – 12 rushes, 40 yards
- CHI – Jeremy Langford – 11 rushes, 28 yards, TD

**Top receivers**

- PHI – Jordan Matthews – 6 receptions, 71 yards
- CHI – Alshon Jeffery – 5 receptions, 96 yards

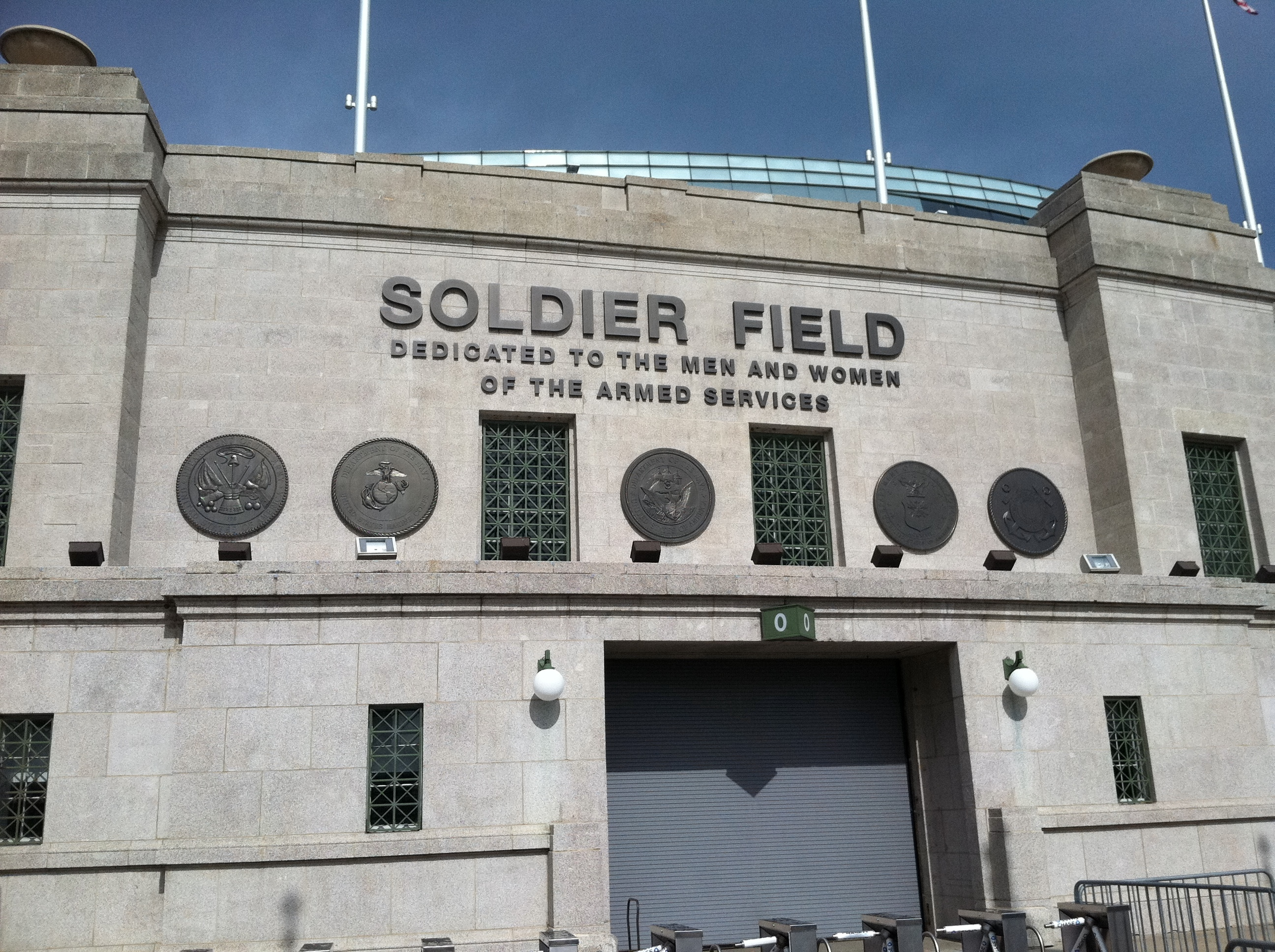
The Bears played all of their home games at Soldier Field.

The Bears' home opener was against the Philadelphia Eagles. In 43 games, the Bears led the all-time series 30–12–1; though the Eagles won their last game in 2013 54–11, the Bears won 31–26 in their most recent game at Soldier Field in 2010. From 1933–1995, the Bears won all 15 games against the Eagles in Chicago, but were 2–5 since. The game also marked the second Bears–Eagles game on Monday Night Football in Soldier Field (the first since a 27–13 win in 1989) and the first MNF game between the two since a 30–24 victory at Lincoln Financial Field in 2011. For the Bears' offense to succeed against the Eagles, Jeff Joniak stated it would have to be more productive; while the Bears had 12 possessions (a league average) against the Texans, none of them were at least ten plays long, while also having only 54 snaps, the second-least in the NFL. In comparison, in their win against the Browns in week one, the Eagles ran 73 plays with a league-high 39:20 time of possession. On defense, the Bears had to improve on third down, where they allowed an NFL-high 12 of 20 third down conversions last week. Likewise, the defense had to pressure Eagles rookie quarterback Carson Wentz, who completed all eight of his passes in blitzing situations against Cleveland.

After Chicago punted, Philadelphia took the lead with Caleb Sturgis' 25-yard field goal. Though the Bears attempted to respond with Connor Barth's 31-yard kick, it hit the left upright; they would take the lead on their next series with Jeremy Langford's one-yard touchdown run, receiving support from Jay Cutler throwing a 49-yard pass to Alshon Jeffery to reach the Eagles' five-yard line. Sturgis kicked 29- and 53-yard field goals to give the Eagles the 9–7 lead entering halftime. During the half, Cutler injured his right thumb and aggravated it during the Bears' first drive of the third quarter when he was strip-sacked by Destiny Vaeao. Late in the quarter, the Eagles scored two touchdowns in 21 seconds; Ryan Mathews scored on a three-yard run and Trey Burton caught a two-yard pass from Wentz (although Sturgis missed the following extra point); the Burton score was established after Cutler's pass for Jeffery was intercepted by Nigel Bradham. Cutler left the game prior to the start of the fourth quarter and was replaced by Brian Hoyer. With Hoyer leading the offense, the Bears traveled 25 yards before their drive ended due to Langford fumbling the ball and the Eagles' Ron Brooks recovering. Philadelphia converted the turnover into a score with Mathews' one-yard touchdown run. With 5:09 left in the game, Eddie Royal scored on a 65-yard punt return, but Brent Celek ended any chance of a comeback when he recovered Barth's onside kick.

The Bears fell to 0–2 for the second consecutive year for the first time since 1997–1998, while also having lost 11 of their last 12 games at home. Royal's touchdown was the Bears' first second half score of the season; after two games, the team was outscored 33–7 in the second half. The Bears also struggled with injuries during the game, with seven players exiting as a result: Cutler (thumb), Lamarr Houston (knee), Eddie Goldman (ankle), Adrian Amos, Bryce Callahan and Chris Prosinski (concussions), and Ka'Deem Carey (hamstring).

==== Week 3: at Dallas Cowboys ====
Week Three: Chicago Bears at Dallas Cowboys – Game summary

Quarter	1	2	3	4	Total
Bears	0	3	7	7	**17**
**Cowboys**	10	14	0	7	**31**

at AT&T Stadium, Arlington, Texas

- Date: September 25
- Game time: 7:30 pm. CDT
- Game weather: Played indoors (retractable roof closed)
- Game attendance: 90,554
- Referee: Craig Wrolstad
- TV announcers (NBC): Al Michaels, Cris Collinsworth and Michele Tafoya
- Recap, Game book

Game information

**First quarter**

- DAL – Dak Prescott 1-yard run (Dan Bailey kick), 9:30. Cowboys 7–0. **Drive: 10 plays, 75 yards, 5:30.**
- DAL – Dan Bailey 49-yard field goal, 1:54. Cowboys 10–0. **Drive: 9 plays, 44 yards, 4:59.**

**Second quarter**

- DAL – Lance Dunbar 1-yard run (Dan Bailey kick), 11:11. Cowboys 17–0. **Drive: 9 plays, 72 yards, 4:09.**
- CHI – Connor Barth 34-yard field goal, 7:47. Cowboys 17–3. **Drive: 7 plays, 59 yards, 3:24.**
- DAL – Alfred Morris 3-yard run (Dan Bailey kick), 0:38. Cowboys 24–3. **Drive: 12 plays, 73 yard, 7:09.**

**Third quarter**

- CHI – Zach Miller 2-yard pass from Brian Hoyer (Connor Barth kick), 7:08. Cowboys 24–10. **Drive: 11 plays, 63 yards, 4:54.**

**Fourth quarter**

- DAL – Dez Bryant 17-yard pass from Dak Prescott (Dan Bailey kick), 9:02. Cowboys 31–10. **Drive: 10 plays, 88 yards, 6:35.**
- CHI – Zach Miller 6-yard pass from Brian Hoyer (Connor Barth kick), 6:28. Cowboys 31–17. **Drive: 8 plays, 75 yards, 2:34.**

**Top passers**

- CHI – Brian Hoyer – 30/49, 317 yards, 2 TD
- DAL – Dak Prescott – 19/24, 248 yards, TD

**Top rushers**

- CHI – Jordan Howard – 9 rushes, 45 yards
- DAL – Ezekiel Elliott – 30 rushes, 140 yards

**Top receivers**

- CHI – Zach Miller – 8 receptions, 78 yards, 2 TD
- DAL – Cole Beasley – 7 receptions, 73 yards

In week three, the Bears went to Arlington, Texas to face the Dallas Cowboys in the second game of 2016 against a Texas-based team; this marked the first time since 1992 that the Bears played on the road against both Texas teams in a season. Week three marked the 26th game between Chicago and Dallas, the latter leading the series 14–11 entering the game. While the Bears won the last game in Dallas 34–18 (in 2012), the Cowboys won the most recent game 41–28 (in 2014). Jeff Joniak wrote the Bears offense should attack the Cowboys with their run game; the latter had allowed 4.8 yards per carry in the first two games. Additionally, the offense was without Jay Cutler after his injury sustained in week two, meaning Brian Hoyer started against Dallas, though Alshon Jeffery, who was battling knee injuries during the week, made his return for week three. The defense, also depleted by injuries with players like Danny Trevathan and Eddie Goldman ruled out for the game, had to be able to successfully tackle Cowboys receiver Dez Bryant and tight end Jason Witten while also applying pressure on rookie quarterback Dak Prescott. Joniak also wrote the Bears needed to excel on both sides in the red zone; against the Eagles, the Bears defense had a 50 percent touchdown efficiency in the red zone, made some big plays in the red zone in the loss to the Eagles, with a 50 percent touchdown efficiency rating on six attempts. Meanwhile, against the Washington Redskins, the Cowboys restricted them to just two field goals in the red zone, including a late interception by Barry Church.

The Bears fell behind early when Prescott scored on a quarterback sneak during the opening drive. The Bears' next two drives ended with punts, while the Cowboys' resulting drives concluded with scores: Dan Bailey kicked a 49-yard field goal and Lance Dunbar scored on a one-yard run. Down 17–0, Chicago would score their first points of the game via Connor Barth's 34-yard field goal in the second quarter. On the following kickoff, Barth attempted an onside kick that Sherrick McManis successfully recovered, but Jonathan Anderson was ruled offsides, nullifying the play. Instead of retrying the onside, Barth simply kicked off. Dallas scored on the next drive with Alfred Morris' three-yard touchdown run. After the Bears punted to start the second half, they regained possession when Terrance Williams was stripped by Jacoby Glenn and Adrian Amos recovered the ball. The takeaway resulted in the first touchdown of the game for the Bears when Hoyer threw a two-yard touchdown pass to Zach Miller. Though the Cowboys punted on their next drive, Cameron Meredith was stripped by J. J. Wilcox and Tyrone Crawford recovered the fumble. However, they were unable to score when Bailey missed a 47-yard field goal wide left. In the fourth quarter, the Cowboys extended the lead when Bryant scored on a 17-yard touchdown catch. Hoyer responded when he threw a six-yard touchdown pass to Miller to make the score 31–14, but he lost a fumble when he was strip-sacked by Benson Mayowa on the Bears' next series, while the offense was unable to score on their final possession.

==== Week 4: vs. Detroit Lions ====
Week Four: Detroit Lions at Chicago Bears – Game summary

Quarter	1	2	3	4	Total
Lions	0	3	3	8	**14**
**Bears**	7	0	7	3	**17**

at Soldier Field, Chicago, Illinois

- Date: October 2
- Game time: 12:00 pm. CDT
- Game weather: 62 °F (17 °C), cloudy
- Game attendance: 60,841
- Referee: Tony Corrente
- TV announcers (Fox): Kenny Albert, Daryl Johnston and Laura Okmin
- Recap, Game book

Game information

**First quarter**

- CHI – Eddie Royal 4-yard pass from Brian Hoyer (Connor Barth kick), 6:35. Bears 7–0. **Drive: 10 plays, 83 yards, 5:02.**

**Second quarter**

- DET – Matt Prater 50-yard field goal, 2:19. Bears 7–3. **Drive: 9 plays, 31 yards, 4:11.**

**Third quarter**

- DET – Matt Prater 21-yard field goal, 7:18. Bears 7–6. **Drive: 13 plays, 66 yards, 7:42.**
- CHI – Zach Miller 6-yard pass from Brian Hoyer (Connor Barth kick), 3:34. Bears 14–6. **Drive: 6 plays, 75 yards, 3:44.**

**Fourth quarter**

- CHI – Connor Barth 25-yard field goal, 10:09. Bears 17–6. **Drive: 11 plays, 73 yards, 5:51.**
- DET – Andre Roberts 85-yard punt return (Matthew Stafford–Golden Tate pass), 1:52. Bears 17–14.

**Top passers**

- DET – Matthew Stafford – 23/36, 213 yards, 2 INT
- CHI – Brian Hoyer – 28/36, 302 yards, 2 TD

**Top rushers**

- DET – Theo Riddick – 11 rushes, 31 yards
- CHI – Jordan Howard – 23 rushes, 111 yards

**Top receivers**

- DET – Anquan Boldin – 6 receptions, 31 yards
- CHI – Eddie Royal – 7 receptions, 111 yards, TD

The 172nd game in the Bears–Lions rivalry took place in week four. Entering the game, the Bears held a 96–71–5 lead over the Lions, though the Lions had won the last six meetings; Chicago's last victory had been a 26–21 win in 2012. The first divisional game of the year, the Bears had struggled against NFC North teams in recent years; of their last 18 divisional matchups, they lost 14, including seven of the last nine at home. In his Keys to the Game, Jeff Joniak stated the Bears offense, once again with Brian Hoyer starting at quarterback in place of a still-healing Jay Cutler, had to hold off Teryl Austin's blitzes; the Lions had the second-highest number of blitzes in the league. While Detroit's top pass rusher Ezekiel Ansah was nursing an ankle injury, substitute Kerry Hyder recorded four sacks in his place. Joniak added the Bears could attack linebacker Tahir Whitehead, who had allowed three touchdown passes in 2016. Against a Detroit offense led by quarterback Matthew Stafford, the Bears needed to contain his targets like Marvin Jones, who had excelled over the course of the 2016 season, Pro Bowler Golden Tate, the experienced Anquan Boldin and young tight end Eric Ebron. As in previous games, third down was a critical factor in the game, Joniak stating the defense "must get off the field."

After both teams exchanged punts on their first drives, the Bears scored first when Hoyer threw a four-yard touchdown pass to Eddie Royal despite being covered by Nevin Lawson. The next six series of the game ended in punts, the trend ending when the Bears were stopped on fourth down in Lions territory midway through the second quarter; Detroit eventually gained three points when Matt Prater kicked a 50-yard field goal. Connor Barth attempted his own 50-yard field goal on the next drive, but missed it wide right. With 16 seconds left in the first half, Stafford's pass for Tate was intercepted by Jacoby Glenn. The Bears were unable to turn the turnover into points as the half ended before they could score. Upon receiving the ball for the start of the second half, the Lions scored on Prater's 21-yard field goal, which the Bears responded on their following drive with Hoyer's six-yard touchdown pass to Zach Miller; the drive gained momentum when Royal recorded a 64-yard pass play, the Bears' longest play from scrimmage of the season. The Lions punted again and the Bears were able to extend their lead with their fourth quarter drive culminating in Barth's 25-yard field goal. With 4:03 left in the game, Stafford's pass for Boldin was intercepted by Deiondre' Hall, but the Lions retaliated when Andre Roberts returned a punt 85 yards for a touchdown. The Lions closed the margin to just three points when Stafford completed the two-point conversion to Tate. With the score now 17–14, the Lions attempted an onside kick, but Sam Acho recovered. Hoyer kneeled three times to seal Chicago's first win of the season.

==== Week 5: at Indianapolis Colts ====
Week Five: Chicago Bears at Indianapolis Colts – Game summary

Quarter	1	2	3	4	Total
Bears	3	10	0	10	**23**
**Colts**	3	13	3	10	**29**

at Lucas Oil Stadium, Indianapolis, Indiana

- Date: October 9
- Game time: 1:00 p.m. EDT/12:00 pm. CDT
- Game weather: 60 °F (16 °C), mostly sunny – retractable roof open
- Game attendance: 66,622
- Referee: John Hussey
- TV announcers (Fox): Joe Buck, Troy Aikman and Erin Andrews
- Recap, Game book

Game information

**First quarter**

- CHI – Connor Barth 35-yard field goal, 8:24. Bears 3–0. **Drive: 12 plays, 51 yards, 6:36.**
- IND – Adam Vinatieri 54-yard field goal, 5:10. Tied 3–3. **Drive: 8 plays, 45 yards, 3:14.**

**Second quarter**

- IND – Dwayne Allen 1-yard pass from Andrew Luck (Adam Vinatieri kick), 12:58. Colts 10–3. **Drive: 12 plays, 80 yards, 5:44.**
- CHI – Connor Barth 49-yard field goal, 8:22. Colts 10–6. **Drive: 8 plays, 44 yards, 4:36.**
- IND – Adam Vinatieri 53-yard field goal, 6:08. Colts 13–6. **Drive: 6 plays, 27 yards, 2:14.**
- CHI – Cameron Meredith 14-yard pass from Brian Hoyer (Connor Barth kick), 3:35. Tied 13–13. **Drive: 5 plays, 75 yards, 2:33.**
- IND – Adam Vinatieri 26-yard field goal, 0:11. Colts 16–13. **Drive: 11 plays, 67 yards, 3:24.**

**Third quarter**

- IND – Adam Vinatieri 41-yard field goal, 5:52. Colts 19–13. **Drive: 11 plays, 45 yards, 5:08.**

**Fourth quarter**

- CHI – Connor Barth 24-yard field goal, 13:31. Colts 19–16. **Drive: 9 plays, 78 yards, 4:15.**
- CHI – Jordan Howard 21-yard pass from Brian Hoyer (Connor Barth kick), 7:04. Bears 23–19. **Drive: 9 plays, 96 yards, 4:45.**
- IND – T. Y. Hilton 35-yard pass from Andrew Luck (Adam Vinatieri kick), 3:43. Colts 26–23. **Drive: 6 plays, 82 yards, 3:21.**
- IND – Adam Vinatieri 46-yard field goal, 2:28. Colts 29–23. **Drive: 4 plays, 1 yard, 1:01.**

**Top passers**

- CHI – Brian Hoyer – 33/43, 397 yards, 2 TD
- IND – Andrew Luck – 28/39, 322 yards, 2 TD

**Top rushers**

- CHI – Jordan Howard – 16 rushes, 118 yards
- IND – Frank Gore – 14 rushes, 75 yards

**Top receivers**

- CHI – Cameron Meredith – 9 receptions, 130 yards, TD
- IND – T. Y. Hilton – 10 receptions, 171 yards, TD

Eight years after their last game in Indianapolis (a 29–13 victory), the Bears returned to play the Colts in week five. The 43rd game between the two franchise, the Bears trailed the series 19–23, but won the last two games, recently a 41–21 win in 2012. "An efficient offensive attack", particularly a rushing-based offense like against the Lions, was a key to success against the Colts defense, according to Jeff Joniak; the Colts allowed the second-highest runs of at least four yards with 51.5 percent. He added the offense should punctuate the run with deep passes, as the Colts were the most penalized defense in the NFL with six pass interference and three personal fouls, along with just four turnovers forced resulting in only three total points. Meanwhile, the Bears defense had to attack Colts quarterback Andrew Luck; Indianapolis was allowing a league-high 15 sacks, was ranked 29th in pass protection efficiency, the second-most hurries (35) the highest number of knockdowns (33) allowed, along with 10 combined false start and holding penalties. Joniak added jet lag could play a factor in the game, as the Colts had lost in London the week before and had no bye week.

Connor Barth scored the first points of the game when he kicked a 35-yard field goal on the Bears' opening drive. Adam Vinatieri responded with a 54-yard field goal and the Colts took the lead in the second quarter when Luck threw a one-yard touchdown pass to Dwayne Allen. Both teams traded field goals on their next drives before Brian Hoyer threw a 14-yard touchdown pass to Cameron Meredith. With 11 seconds left in the first half, Vinatieri kicked a 26-yard field goal to give Indianapolis the 16–13 lead at halftime. He converted a 41-yard field goal in the third quarter to increase the margin to six points; when Barth tried a 49-yarder on the next series, he missed it wide left, but redeemed himself with a 24-yard kick in the fourth. Hoyer later led the Bears on a 96-yard drive, ending it with a 21-yard touchdown pass to Jordan Howard; the drive was the longest touchdown-scoring series since a 97-yard possession against the Steelers in 2009. Luck responded with a 35-yard touchdown pass to T. Y. Hilton, who beat Jacoby Glenn for the score, followed by Vinatieri's 35-yard field goal after Meredith lost a fumble. Down by six points, Hoyer attempted to rally the Bears on one last drive but missed an open Alshon Jeffery on fourth down, throwing an incomplete pass to Meredith. The Colts ran out the clock to end the game.

With the loss, the Bears fell to 1–4, their worst five-week start since they started the 2004 season 1–4. They ended the game with 522 offensive yards, the most since they recorded 542 in a 1989 win against the Lions and the most in a loss since 1940.

==== Week 6: vs. Jacksonville Jaguars ====
Week Six: Jacksonville Jaguars at Chicago Bears – Game summary

Quarter	1	2	3	4	Total
**Jaguars**	0	0	0	17	**17**
Bears	0	10	3	3	**16**

at Soldier Field, Chicago, Illinois

- Date: October 16
- Game time: 12:00 pm. CDT
- Game weather: 69 °F (21 °C), cloudy
- Game attendance: 55,614
- Referee: Clete Blakeman
- TV announcers (CBS): Andrew Catalon, Steve Beuerlein and Steve Tasker
- Recap, Game book

Game information

**First quarter**

- No scoring plays

**Second quarter**

- CHI – Connor Barth 36-yard field goal, 14:12. Bears 3–0. **Drive: 11 plays, 58 yards, 5:30.**
- CHI – Jordan Howard 1-yard run (Connor Barth kick), 4:29. Bears 10–0. **Drive: 16 plays, 86 yards, 7:31.**

**Third quarter**

- CHI – Connor Barth 24-yard field goal, 1:53. Bears 13–0. **Drive: 11 plays, 74 yards, 5:43.**

**Fourth quarter**

- JAX – Chris Ivory 1-yard run (Jason Myers kick), 14:50. Bears 13–7. **Drive: 5 plays, 75 yards, 2:03.**
- CHI – Connor Barth 32-yard field goal, 8:28. Bears 16–7. **Drive: 6 plays, 14 yards, 3:06.**
- JAX – Jason Myers 30-yard field goal, 4:59. Bears 16–10. **Drive: 11 plays, 63 yards, 3:29.**
- JAX – Arrelious Benn 51-yard pass from Blake Bortles (Jason Myers kick), 2:49. Jaguars 17–16. **Drive: 4 plays, 78 yards, 0:29.**

**Top passers**

- JAX – Blake Bortles – 20/33, 271 yards, TD, INT
- CHI – Brian Hoyer – 30/49, 302 yards

**Top rushers**

- JAX – Chris Ivory – 11 rushes, 32 yards, TD
- CHI – Ka'Deem Carey – 9 rushes, 50 yards

**Top receivers**

- JAX – Allen Hurns – 5 receptions, 74 yards
- CHI – Cameron Meredith – 11 reception, 113 yards

The Bears hosted the Jacksonville Jaguars in week six, their first game since a 41–3 Bears victory in 2012 and the first in Chicago since the Bears won 23–10 in 2008. In six games, the Bears led the series 4–2. Jeff Joniak wrote the offense should employ a run-based attack with Jordan Howard, interspersed with short passes by Brian Hoyer. The Bears led the league in passes of at least four yards and rushes of at least six yards on first down. Defensively, the Bears needed to disrupt quarterback Blake Bortles' rhythm; when his consistency is broken, he is prone to throwing interceptions. To do so, Joniak stated the Bears should apply a pass rush as "young quarterbacks don't like pressure." Meanwhile, Jacksonville's rushing attack, while not seeing much action, was spearheaded by T. J. Yeldon and Chris Ivory. Joniak also believed a crucial factor of the game is the battle on third down, where the Jaguars had struggled during the season. Of his six interceptions in 2016, Bortles had thrown four on third down, while the Jaguars were ranked 29th and 32nd on third down defense and offense, respectively.

The Bears escaped a 7–0 deficit when Tracy Porter intercepted Bortles in the endzone to stop an 84-yard drive, instead taking a three-point lead on Connor Barth's 36-yard field goal in the second quarter. After the Jaguars punted, the Bears drove 86 yards and scored on Jordan Howard's one-yard touchdown run. By halftime, the Bears led 10–0, the first time they had shut out an opponent in the first half since 2012 against the Lions. The first five drives of the second half failed to result in a score, instead ending with punts before the Bears widened the margin to 13 points with Barth kicking a 24-yard field goal. The Jaguars responded with Ivory's one-yard touchdown run in the fourth quarter; after a Chicago punt, they reclaimed possession when Willie Young stripped the ball from Bortles and Akiem Hicks recovered the fumble. Barth kicked a 32-yard field goal, but Jacksonville's Jason Myers narrowed the margin to six points with a 30-yard field goal. The Bears eventually punted again and four plays into the Jaguars' following drive, Bortles threw a pass to Arrelious Benn, who took advantage of Porter slipping to score on a 51-yard play and give the Jaguars the lead. With 2:49 left in the game, Brian Hoyer attempted to lead the Bears downfield, reaching as far as the Jaguars' 44-yard line when a holding penalty on Howard forced the Bears back. On fourth down, Hoyer's pass for Cameron Meredith was broken up by Jalen Ramsey and the Jaguars ran out the clock to claim the 17–16 win.

The Bears dropped to 1–5, their worst start since 2004, and their 16th home loss in the last 20 games. The loss was also the first time the Bears lost despite a 13-point lead entering the fourth quarter since a 1999 loss to the Seattle Seahawks.

==== Week 7: at Green Bay Packers ====
Week Seven: Chicago Bears at Green Bay Packers – Game summary

Quarter	1	2	3	4	Total
Bears	0	3	7	0	**10**
**Packers**	3	3	7	13	**26**

at Lambeau Field, Green Bay, Wisconsin

- Date: October 20
- Game time: 7:25 pm. CDT
- Game weather: 47 °F (8 °C), cloudy
- Game attendance: 78,217
- Referee: John Parry
- TV announcers (CBS/NFLN/Twitter): Jim Nantz, Phil Simms and Tracy Wolfson
- Recap, Game book

Game information

**First quarter**

- GB – Mason Crosby 32-yard field goal, 8:53. Packers 3–0. **Drive: 13 plays, 53 yards, 5:19.**

**Second quarter**

- CHI – Connor Barth 39-yard field goal, 1:56. Tied 3–3. **Drive: 9 plays, 54 yards, 4:38.**
- GB – Mason Crosby 40-yard field goal, 0:17. Packers 6–3. **Drive: 10 plays, 53 yards, 1:39.**

**Third quarter**

- CHI – Leonard Floyd fumble recovery in end zone, 14:30. Bears 10–6.
- GB – Davante Adams 5-yard pass from Aaron Rodgers (Mason Crosby kick), 9:11. Packers 13–10. **Drive: 13 plays, 85 yards, 5:19.**

**Fourth quarter**

- GB – Davante Adams 4-yard pass from Aaron Rodgers (Mason Crosby kick), 14:55. Packers 20–10. **Drive: 8 plays, 88 yards, 4:40.**
- GB – Randall Cobb 2-yard pass from Aaron Rodgers, 5:35. Packers 26–10. **Drive: 13 plays, 74 yards, 8:33.**

**Top passers**

- CHI – Matt Barkley – 6/15, 81 yards, 2 INT
- GB – Aaron Rodgers – 39/56, 326 yards, 3 TD

**Top rushers**

- CHI – Ka'Deem Carey – 10 rushes, 48 yards
- GB – Ty Montgomery – 9 rushes, 60 yards

**Top receivers**

- CHI – Alshon Jeffery – 3 receptions, 33 yards
- GB – Davante Adams – 13 receptions, 132 yards

The Bears took on the rival Green Bay Packers at Lambeau Field in week seven. The game was the eleventh consecutive primetime game between the two and the sixth in Green Bay, with the Bears winning two of the last three. Entering week seven, the Bears led the all-time series 93–91–6. In the teams' last meetings since the turn of the decade, the Bears had lost all but three games, including the most recent game in 2015, a 17–13 victory in Green Bay. The Bears were struggling to score in 2016, averaging a league-worst 16.8 points per game. As such, Jeff Joniak wrote the Bears needed to score touchdowns, especially considering their struggles in the red zone (on 19 trips to the region, the Bears scored only nine times). Outside of the red zone, the Bears scored only 10 points; in comparison, the NFL average was 37. Chicago's rushing attack faced a Green Bay defense that allowed only eight runs of at least ten yards and 3.4 yards on first down, the third-lowest in the league. On defense, the Bears faced Aaron Rodgers; while the Packers offense was only 26th in yardage and at –3 in turnover ratio, the unit led the league in third down completion percentage. Rodgers also excelled in the first quarter of games, where he had thrown four touchdown passes, good for second in the league, and a 106 passer rating. However, the Packers struggled on drives starting within their own 20-yard line, failing to score on 14 such drives, the only team unable to do so. Joniak also wrote the team needed a "spark"; defeating the Packers at Lambeau for the second straight season would "do wonders for a young team trying to find its way."

After the Bears punted on the opening drive, the Packers took the lead first with Mason Crosby's 32-yard field goal. The Bears were forced to punt again on their next series and the Packers reached as far as the Bears' one-yard line before they were stopped on fourth down. On Chicago's resulting drive, Brian Hoyer was hit by Clay Matthews and Julius Peppers while throwing a pass, breaking his left arm. With Jay Cutler also inactive, third-string quarterback Matt Barkley took over for the next possession. With Barkley, the Bears were able to score points via Connor Barth's 39-yard field goal, which the Packers responded with Crosby's 40-yard kick. On Green Bay's first drive of the second half, Leonard Floyd strip-sacked Rodgers, recovering the fumble in the endzone to give the Bears the 10–6 lead. The score marked the Bears' first defensive touchdown since 2014. Rodgers overcame the play by throwing a five-yard touchdown pass to Davante Adams, followed by two more touchdown passes to Adams and Randall Cobb of four and two yards, respectively (though Crosby missed an extra point). Down 26–10, the Bears' next two series ended with interceptions, Barkley being intercepted by Blake Martinez and Nick Perry.

The 1–6 start marked the first start with such a record since 2000.

==== Week 8: vs. Minnesota Vikings ====
Week Eight: Minnesota Vikings at Chicago Bears – Game summary

Quarter	1	2	3	4	Total
Vikings	0	3	0	7	**10**
**Bears**	3	10	7	0	**20**

at Soldier Field, Chicago, Illinois

- Date: October 31
- Game time: 7:30 pm. CDT
- Game weather: 58 °F (14 °C), cloudy
- Game attendance: 60,422
- Referee: Gene Steratore
- TV announcers (ESPN): Sean McDonough, Jon Gruden and Lisa Salters
- Recap, Game book

Game information

**First quarter**

- CHI – Connor Barth 30-yard field goal, 8:28. Bears 3–0. **Drive: 7 plays, 81 yards, 3:40.**

**Second quarter**

- CHI – Connor Barth 28-yard field goal, 12:44. Bears 6–0. **Drive: 8 plays, 64 yards, 3:33.**
- CHI – Jordan Howard 2-yard run (Connor Barth kick), 7:49. Bears 13–0. **Drive: 6 plays, 43 yards, 3:36.**
- MIN – Blair Walsh 30-yard field goal, 0:25. Bears 13–3. **Drive: 15 plays, 59 yards, 7:24.**

**Third quarter**

- CHI – Alshon Jeffery 11-yard pass from Jay Cutler (Connor Barth kick), 9:52. Bears 20–3. **Drive: 11 plays, 75 yards, 5:08.**

**Fourth quarter**

- MIN – Stefon Diggs 25-yard pass from Sam Bradford (Blair Walsh kick), 5:41. Bears 20–10. **Drive: 10 plays, 83 yards, 3:10.**

**Top passers**

- MIN – Sam Bradford – 23/37, 228 yards, TD
- CHI – Jay Cutler – 20/31, 252 yards, TD

**Top rushers**

- MIN – Matt Asiata – 14 rushes, 42 yards
- CHI – Jordan Howard – 26 rushes, 153 yards, TD

**Top receivers**

- MIN – Stefon Diggs – 8 receptions, 76 yards, TD
- CHI – Zach Miller – 7 receptions, 88 yards

Week eight saw the second Monday night matchup of 2016 for the Bears as they hosted the 5–1 Minnesota Vikings. In the rivalry, the Vikings led the series 57–51–2. In 12 games played on Mondays, the two teams were split with six wins apiece. A week before the game, John Fox officially cleared Jay Cutler to return to practice and make his first start since week two. With Cutler back, Jeff Joniak emphasized the offense helping him to adapt to game conditions once again, especially against a Vikings defense that had allowed just 14 points per game and a league-low 279.5 yards per game while recording a league-best 16 turnovers and a +11 turnover ratio. Cutler also had to watch for the front seven, as the Vikings had four players with at least three sacks, while the defensive line had 17 combined sacks, five forced fumbles, 17 tackles for loss, an interception and a safety. On defense, the Bears had to pressure quarterback Sam Bradford, who completed only five passes in week seven against the Eagles while being blitzed on 15 occasions. Additionally, Minnesota's rushing game lacked its top two running backs and had 29 runs of negative yards, the most in the NFL. As the bye week approached, Joniak stated, "Playing with pride and with heart is as much a part of this matchup as anything."

After the Vikings punted on their opening drive, the Bears scored on Connor Barth's 30-yard field goal; the drive had been set up by Jordan Howard's 69-yard run. Howard also provided a 34-yard catch six drives later, which helped lead to Barth kicking a 28-yard field goal in the second quarter. On Chicago's next possession, Howard scored on a two-yard touchdown run. Minnesota came close to scoring a touchdown on the following series, including reaching as far as Chicago's two-yard line, but Bradford was sacked by Akiem Hicks on third down; the Vikings were forced to settle for Blair Walsh's 30-yard field goal. The Bears scored on the first drive of the second half when Cutler threw an 11-yard touchdown pass to Alshon Jeffery to give the Bears a 20–3 lead. Neither team scored on each of their next two drives. With 5:41 left in the game, Bradford threw a 25-yard touchdown pass to Stefon Diggs to cut the margin to ten points, but the Bears offense consumed much of the time remaining. When the Bears finally punted, there was only four seconds left and Bradford ended the game with a 25-yard pass to Cordarrelle Patterson.

In his return, Cutler completed 20 of 31 passes for 252 yards, a touchdown and a 100.5 passer rating, while the offense recorded 403 yards with no turnovers. Howard, who recorded 153 rushing yards, 49 receiving yards and a rushing touchdown, was named the NFC Offensive Player of the Week. On defense, the Bears sacked Bradford five times, forced the Vikings offense to go three-and-out on three straight drives and convert just two of their thirteen third-down situations.

==== Week 10: at Tampa Bay Buccaneers ====
Week Ten: Chicago Bears at Tampa Bay Buccaneers – Game summary

Quarter	1	2	3	4	Total
Bears	3	7	0	0	**10**
**Buccaneers**	7	10	12	7	**36**

at Raymond James Stadium, Tampa, Florida

- Date: November 13
- Game time: 1:00 pm. EST/12:00 pm. CST
- Game weather: 81 °F (27 °C), cloudy
- Game attendance: 62,898
- Referee: Walt Coleman
- TV announcers (Fox): Dan Hellie, David Diehl and Holly Sonders
- Recap, Game book

Game information

**First quarter**

- TB – Chris Conte 20-yard interception return (Roberto Aguayo kick), 5:42. Buccaneers 7–0.
- CHI – Connor Barth 54-yard field goal, 2:47. Buccaneers 7–3. **Drive: 6 plays, 50 yards, 2:52.**

**Second quarter**

- TB – Cameron Brate 10-yard pass from Jameis Winston (Roberto Agauyo kick), 3:38. Buccaneers 14–3. **Drive: 4 plays, 29 yards, 2:04.**
- TB – Roberto Aguayo 30-yard field goal, 0:35. Buccaneers 17–3. **Drive: 8 plays, 41 yards, 1:14.**
- CHI – Cameron Meredith 50-yard pass from Jay Cutler (Connor Barth kick), 0:05. Buccaneers 17–10. **Drive: 4 plays, 83 yards, 0:31.**

**Third quarter**

- TB – Freddie Martino 43-yard pass from Jameis Winston (Roberto Aguayo kick), 13:13. Buccaneers 24–10. **Drive: 4 plays, 77 yards, 1:55.**
- TB – Roberto Aguayo 27-yard field goal, 5:23. Buccaneers 27–10. **Drive: 11 plays, 52 yards, 5:58.**
- TB – Jay Cutler sacked by Robert Ayers in the endzone for a safety, 0:58. Buccaneers 29–10.

**Fourth quarter**

- TB – Doug Martin 1-yard run (Roberto Aguayo kick), 6:00. Buccaneers 36–10. **Drive: 17 plays, 62 yards, 9:56.**

**Top passers**

- CHI – Jay Cutler – 16/30, 182 yards, TD, 2 INT
- TB – Jameis Winston – 23/33, 312 yards, 2 TD, INT

**Top rushers**

- CHI – Jordan Howard – 15 rushes, 100 yards
- TB – Peyton Barber – 12 rushes, 38 yards

**Top receivers**

- CHI – Cameron Meredith – 1 reception, 50 yards
- TB – Cameron Brate – 7 receptions, 84 yards, TD

Returning from the bye week, the Bears visited Raymond James Stadium to take on the Tampa Bay Buccaneers, who the Bears led 38–18 in the all-time series entering the game, also winning last season's game 26–21. According to Jeff Joniak, the Bears offense could exploit the Buccaneers defense in the redzone, which ranked 28th in touchdown efficiency and 30th in scoring on plays within the 30-yard line. Defensively, the Bears had to apply pressure on quarterback Jameis Winston and cover receiver Mike Evans. Joniak described the Bears as "inspired" by the Monday night victory against the Vikings and to not "let that [winning] feeling disintegrate" in Tampa.

The Bears and Bucs exchanged punts on their opening drives before the first turnover of the game was committed when Jay Cutler's pass for Alshon Jeffery was intercepted by Brent Grimes. Though Tampa Bay was forced to punt on the following drive, they scored when former Bears safety Chris Conte intercepted Cutler's pass to Logan Paulsen and returned it for a touchdown. The Bears eventually scored on Connor Barth's 54-yard field goal and regained the ball when Winston's pass for Cecil Shorts was deflected and intercepted by Harold Jones-Quartey. Chicago took advantage of the turnover to reach as close as Tampa's four-yard line, but Cutler was sacked by Noah Spence and fumbled, Kwon Alexander recovering the ball for the Bucs. Cameron Brate caught a ten-yard touchdown pass from Winston on the ensuing drive to make the score 14–3, followed by Roberto Aguayo kicking a 30-yard field goal to force a two-touchdown margin. On the final play of the first half, Cutler threw a Hail Mary pass, which was deflected and caught by Cameron Meredith for a 50-yard touchdown. The Bears struggled to get to Winston during the Buccaneers' first drive of the third quarter, three players chasing him into his endzone but were unable to sack him. Winston eventually threw a pass to Evans, who caught it to result in a 39-yard play. A play later, Winston threw a 43-yard touchdown pass to Freddie Martino. Aguayo later kicked a 27-yard field goal, while Robert Ayers sacked Cutler later in the quarter, forcing a fumble that rolled out of the endzone for a safety. Jordan Howard also fumbled when he was tackled by William Gholston, losing it to Bradley McDougald. In the fourth quarter, Doug Martin scored on a one-yard touchdown run to make the final score 36–10.

Cutler struggled in the game, causing four turnovers (two interceptions and two fumbles). Entering the game, Tampa Bay had recorded just four interceptions. The Bears also lost Kyle Long to an ankle injury during the game when Paul Lasike landed on his right foot while attempting to catch an errant screen pass; he was eventually placed on injured reserve. To add to the Bears' woes, Jeffery was suspended for four games on Monday for violating the NFL's performance-enhancing drug use policy.

==== Week 11: at New York Giants ====
Week Eleven: Chicago Bears at New York Giants – Game summary

Quarter	1	2	3	4	Total
Bears	9	7	0	0	**16**
**Giants**	6	3	13	0	**22**

at MetLife Stadium, East Rutherford, New Jersey

- Date: November 20
- Game time: 1:00 pm. EST/12:00 pm. CST
- Game weather: 41 °F (5 °C), mostly cloudy
- Game attendance: 78,898
- Referee: Craig Wrolstad
- TV announcers (Fox): Kevin Burkhardt, John Lynch and Pam Oliver
- Recap, Game book

Game information

**First quarter**

- CHI – Zach Miller 19-yard pass from Jay Cutler (kick failed, wide right), 9:46. Bears 6–0. **Drive: 9 plays, 76 yards, 5:14.**
- NYG – Rashad Jennings 2-yard run (kick failed, hit left upright), 4:04. Tied 6–6. **Drive: 11 plays, 78 yards, 5:42.**
- CHI – Connor Barth 40-yard field goal, 0:24. Bears 9–6. **Drive: 7 plays, 39 yards, 3:40.**

**Second quarter**

- CHI – Jeremy Langford 1-yard run (Connor Barth kick), 8:35. Bears 16–6. **Drive: 8 plays, 79 yards, 4:35.**
- NYG – Robbie Gould 46-yard field goal, 3:33. Bears 16–9. **Drive: 14 plays, 57 yards, 5:02.**

**Third quarter**

- NYG – Will Tye 9-yard pass from Eli Manning (Robbie Gould kick), 11:04. Tied 16–16. **Drive: 9 plays, 56 yards, 3:56.**
- NYG – Sterling Shepard 15-yard pass from Eli Manning (kick failed, wide left), 6:49. Giants 22–16. **Drive: 7 plays, 79 yards, 3:15.**

**Fourth quarter**

- No scoring plays

**Top passers**

- CHI – Jay Cutler – 17/30, 252 yards, TD, INT
- NYG – Eli Manning – 21/36, 227 yards, 2 TD

**Top rushers**

- CHI – Jordan Howard – 17 rushes, 77 yards
- NYG – Rashad Jennings – 21 rushes, 85 yards, TD

**Top receivers**

- CHI – Cameron Meredith – 4 receptions, 49 yards
- NYG – Sterling Shepard – 5 receptions, 50 yards, TD

The Bears traveled to MetLife Stadium in Week 11 to take on the 6–3 New York Giants. In 57 prior matchups, the Bears led the series 33–25–2. According to Jeff Joniak's Keys to the Game, the Bears offense needed to rely on Jordan Howard and the running game; the rushing attack, which led the NFL in yards per carry (YPC) with 5.5, faced a Giants defense that ranked 18th in first down run defense with 4.27 yards, seventh in overall run defense and fifth in YPC allowed. In terms of rushing plays of at least ten yards, the Giants allowed 19, the fourth-best in the league, while the Bears had 28, including 21 by Howard. On defense, the Bears had to contain New York's players after catches; Odell Beckham Jr. had 281 yards after catches, sixth-most among receivers, while the Giants as a whole was ranked sixth in the category. However, the Giants struggled with turnovers, allowing 18 (including ten by quarterback Eli Manning's interceptions), which ranked 27th in the league. Joniak stated the Bears needed "to find the players who are willing to fight, scratch and crawl their way out of the hole they're in."

On the opening drive, Jay Cutler threw a 19-yard touchdown pass to Zach Miller, but in windy conditions, Connor Barth missed the extra point wide right. The Giants responded with Rashad Jennings' two-yard touchdown run, though former Bear Robbie Gould also missed the extra point when his kick hit the left upright. Barth kicked a 40-yard field goal on the following drive to give the Bears the 9–6 lead at the end of the first quarter. In the second quarter, Howard helped the Bears record a 79-yard drive with a 27-yard run, ending the series with a one-yard touchdown run. Gould kicked a 46-yard field goal to draw the Giants within one touchdown by halftime. The deficit eventually became a 22–16 lead when the Giants scored on their first two drives of the second half: Manning threw a nine-yard touchdown pass to Will Tye, followed by errors from Demonte Hurst and Deon Bush resulting in a 15-yard touchdown pass by Manning to Sterling Shepard, though Gould missed the extra point on the latter's resulting PAT. After the two scores, the Bears defense improved and was able to hold the Giants to five consecutive punts, while punter Pat O'Donnell contributed with 54- and 67-yard punts. However, the offense struggled, punting on all but two drives in the second half. Barth missed a 51-yard field goal when it hit the right upright early in the fourth quarter. Down by six points with three minutes left in the game, Cutler led the offense into Giants territory before the drive stalled: by the time the unit reached New York's 30-yard line, Cutler was sacked by Jason Pierre-Paul and fumbled before recovering his own ball, followed by an illegal shift penalty on Cameron Meredith that drew the Bears further back. Cutler's underthrown pass to Marquess Wilson was intercepted by Landon Collins with 1:11 left in the game to seal the Giants victory.

The already-depleted Bears roster suffered further injuries during the game. Starters Bobby Massie, Eddie Goldman, Mitch Unrein, Kyle Long, Kevin White and Kyle Fuller missed the game due to prior to injuries, while Alshon Jeffery remained suspended. In the game, Josh Sitton suffered an ankle injury, while Cre'Von LeBlanc left the game due to a concussion. Shortly before the end of the first half, Miller broke his right foot when Pierre-Paul stepped on it; he was placed on injured reserve on Wednesday, ending his season. Midway through the fourth quarter, Leonard Floyd was hospitalized after injuring his neck in a collision with Akiem Hicks, though he was later released. To further add to the Bears' troubles, Jerrell Freeman was suspended a day after the game for four games; like Jeffery, he was suspended for using PEDs. Later that day, Cutler was revealed to have suffered a shoulder injury in the game and was placed on injured reserve on December 5.

==== Week 12: vs. Tennessee Titans ====
Week Twelve: Tennessee Titans at Chicago Bears – Game summary

Quarter	1	2	3	4	Total
**Titans**	7	14	3	3	**27**
Bears	7	0	0	14	**21**

at Soldier Field, Chicago, Illinois

- Date: November 27
- Game time: 12:00 pm. CST
- Game weather: 40 °F (4 °C), cloudy
- Game attendance: 59,494
- Referee: Ed Hochuli
- TV announcers (CBS): Spero Dedes and Solomon Wilcots
- Recap, Game book

Game information

**First quarter**

- CHI – Daniel Brown 7-yard pass from Matt Barkley (Connor Barth kick), 4:27. Bears 7–0. **Drive: 13 plays, 84 yards, 5:47.**
- TEN – Derrick Henry 11-yard run (Ryan Succop kick), 0:04. Tied 7–7. **Drive: 7 plays, 75 yards, 4:23.**

**Second quarter**

- TEN – Delanie Walker 4-yard pass from Marcus Mariota (Ryan Succop kick), 9:11. Titans 14–7. **Drive: 8 plays, 64 yards, 5:00.**
- TEN – Rishard Matthews 29-yard pass from Marcus Mariota (Ryan Succop kick), 1:15. Titans 21–7. **Drive: 5 plays, 65 yards, 1:00.**

**Third quarter**

- TEN – Ryan Succop 19-yard field goal, 4:07. Titans 24–7. **Drive: 11 plays, 79 yards, 6:29.**

**Fourth quarter**

- TEN – Ryan Succop 31-yard field goal, 13:45. Titans 27–7. **Drive: 7 plays, 35 yards, 3:13.**
- CHI – Marquess Wilson 8-yard pass from Matt Barkley (Connor Barth kick), 8:23. Titans 27–14. **Drive: 14 plays, 75 yards, 5:22.**
- CHI – Deonte Thompson 6-yard pass from Matt Barkley (Connor Barth kick), 3:06. Titans 27–21. **Drive: 13 plays, 69 yards, 3:29.**

**Top passers**

- TEN – Marcus Mariota – 15/23, 226 yards, 2 TD
- CHI – Matt Barkley – 28/54, 316 yards, 3 TD, 2 INT

**Top rushers**

- TEN – Derrick Henry – 8 rushes, 60 yards, TD
- CHI – Jordan Howard – 18 rushes, 84 yards

**Top receivers**

- TEN – Richard Matthews – 3 receptions, 64 yards, TD
- CHI – Marquess Wilson – 8 receptions, 124 yards, TD

In week twelve, the Bears hosted the 5–6 Tennessee Titans. The Bears were 6–5 in the all-time series, most recently a 51–20 victory in 2012, though the Bears lost the last game in Chicago, a 31–24 defeat in 2008. With Jay Cutler sidelined, Matt Barkley made his first career NFL start against a Dick LeBeau-led defense that blitzed often; on second down, the Titans recorded 12 sacks, second-most in the league. For the Bears defense, they faced an offense powered by a running game featuring DeMarco Murray and Derrick Henry, while quarterback Marcus Mariota led a unit that ranked eighth in the NFL in five-minute drives and a fifth-ranked third down conversion rate. Despite the recent woes, Jeff Joniak wrote the Bears needed to maintain a high morale and allow younger players to develop, both as players and as a team.

On their opening drive, the Bears reached the Titans' 33-yard line before stalling and turning the ball over on downs. After the Titans punted, the Bears scored first when Barkley threw a seven-yard touchdown pass to Daniel Brown, their first career touchdowns. The Titans responded with Henry's 11-yard touchdown run with four seconds left in the first quarter, followed by Mariota throwing a four-yard touchdown pass to Delanie Walker in the second quarter. Chicago attempted to score again when they entered Tennessee's red zone on their next drive, but Barkley's pass for Ben Braunecker was intercepted by Wesley Woodyard. The next two drives of the game ended with a punt before Mariota threw a 29-yard touchdown pass to Rishard Matthews to give the Titans a 21–7 entering halftime. To start the second half, Connor Barth attempted a surprise onside kick, which bounced off Titan Nate Palmer as Adrian Amos recovered. The Bears took advantage to drive to the Titan's five-yard line, but were unable to score as Barkley's pass for Cameron Meredith was intercepted by Da'Norris Searcy in the endzone. Tennessee's Ryan Succop kicked field goals of 19 and 31 yards to increase the lead to 20 points. In the fourth quarter, Barkley began to lead a comeback as he led a 75-yard drive that ended with an eight-yard touchdown pass to Marquess Wilson, followed by a 69-yard scoring drive that concluded with a six-yard touchdown pass to Deonte Thompson to narrow the score to 27–21. The Titans were forced to punt on their next possession with 1:56 left in the game. Barkley moved the Bears downfield with 14-, 21- and 23-yard passes to Wilson, where they reached the Titans' seven-yard line to create a first-and-goal situation with 47 seconds left. Barkley's first pass to Josh Bellamy, which would have resulted in a touchdown, was dropped. His next two passes to Brown and Thompson also fell incomplete. On fourth-and-goal, Thompson dropped a Barkley pass in the back of the endzone to result in a turnover on downs.

In addition to the two late drops by Bellamy and Thompson, the Bears as a whole struggled with drops, with ten total in the game and eight in the fourth quarter.

==== Week 13: vs. San Francisco 49ers ====
Week Thirteen: San Francisco 49ers at Chicago Bears – Game summary

Quarter	1	2	3	4	Total
49ers	0	6	0	0	**6**
**Bears**	0	7	14	5	**26**

at Soldier Field, Chicago, Illinois

- Date: December 4
- Game time: 12:00 pm. CST
- Game weather: 33 °F (1 °C), snow showers
- Game attendance: 59,782
- Referee: Pete Morelli
- TV announcers (Fox): Kenny Albert, Daryl Johnston and Laura Okmin
- Recap, Game book

Game information

**First quarter**

- No scoring plays

**Second quarter**

- SF – Phil Dawson 31-yard field goal, 6:55. 49ers 3–0. **Drive: 4 plays, 6 yards, 2:12.**
- SF – Phil Dawson 28-yard field goal, 1:56. 49ers 6–0. **Drive: 9 plays, 27 yards, 4:51.**
- CHI – Jordan Howard 1-yard run (Connor Barth kick), 0:31. Bears 7–6. **Drive: 8 plays, 81 yards, 1:25.**

**Third quarter**

- CHI – Jordan Howard 2-yard run (Connor Barth kick), 9:32. Bears 14–6. **Drive: 10 plays, 75 yards, 5:28.**
- CHI – Jordan Howard 5-yard run (Connor Barth kick), 6:19. Bears 21–6. **Drive: 4 plays, 59 yards, 2:13.**

**Fourth quarter**

- CHI – Connor Barth 45-yard field goal, 12:55. Bears 24–6. **Drive: 7 plays, 37 yards, 3:19.**
- CHI – Blaine Gabbert sacked in the end zone by Leonard Floyd for a safety, 1:55. Bears 26–6.

**Top passers**

- SF – Blaine Gabbert – 4/10, 35 yards
- CHI – Matt Barkley – 11/18, 192 yards

**Top rushers**

- SF – Carlos Hyde – 20 rushes, 92 yards
- CHI – Jordan Howard – 32 rushes, 117 yards, 3 TD

**Top receivers**

- SF – Vance McDonald – 2 receptions, 9 yards
- CHI – Josh Bellamy – 4 receptions, 93 yards

The 2–9 Bears hosted the 1–10 San Francisco 49ers in Week 13, the 65th meeting between the two teams. The Bears trailed the series 34–30–1 entering the game, including losing last year's game in Chicago by a score of 26–21. Jeff Joniak wrote the Bears offense could exploit a 49ers defense through rushing; in 2016, 49ers' opponents ran the ball 48.2 percent of the time, a league high and nine percent higher than the average. The 49ers also allowed 49 runs of at least 10 yards and 14 runs of 20 yards, meaning the Bears could utilize the running back trio of Jordan Howard, Jeremy Langford, and Ka'Deem Carey effectively. The 49ers had also been outscored by 116 points in 2016. On defense, the Bears needed to stop the 49ers' own rushing attack, led by Carlos Hyde, which ranked fourth in the NFL in running and fourth in plays of at least four yards on first down. The 49ers offense also ran the most plays in the NFL, along with having the fewest minutes with the ball. To add to the 49ers' struggles on offense, they were forced to punt often; punter Bradley Pinion's 64 punts were the most in the league. Joniak stated the Bears, who needed to find a way to force turnovers, could do so against a 49er team that allowed a league-high 83 points after giveaways. In a game that featured snow, Joniak believed the "team [that] handles the situation better could have an edge," and while the Bears would normally have that advantage, much of the roster had little experience playing in such conditions.

Neither team could score in the first quarter as every drive ended with a punt. Early in the second quarter, Shaun Draughn blocked a Bears punt, which was returned by Dontae Johnson for a touchdown. However, a review showed Johnson's foot had stepped out of bounds at the Bears' four-yard line. To add to the play, Rashard Robinson celebrated the apparent score by making a snow angel in the endzone, which drew a 15-yard penalty for unsportsmanlike conduct. As a result, the 49ers started the drive on the 19-yard line and was forced to settle for Phil Dawson's 31-yard field goal. On the ensuing kickoff, Deonte Thompson fumbled the ball and San Francisco's Jimmie Ward recovered, which led to Dawson's 28-yard field goal. With 1:56 left in the first half, Matt Barkley guided the Bears offense on an 81-yard drive with four passes for 64 yards and ended the drive with Jordan Howard's one-yard touchdown run. The Bears' next two drives also ended with scores by Howard via two- and five-yard runs. Connor Barth added a 45-yard field goal in the fourth quarter. 49ers quarterback Colin Kaepernick struggled during the game as he was sacked five times before being replaced by Blaine Gabbert early in the fourth. Gabbert also struggled as he was sacked in the endzone by Leonard Floyd for a safety to make the final score 26–6.

The six points allowed were the fewest by the Bears since they allowed three against Jacksonville in 2012. The defense also forced six sacks and allowed just 147 total yards; the former was the most since 2012 against the St. Louis Rams and the latter is the fewest since 2010 against Carolina. Both teams did not complete a pass in the first quarter; Barkley and Kaepernick attempted a combined three passes in the quarter. It was the first time since the 1988 game between the Patriots and Jets that neither team could complete a pass in a quarter. Kaepernick eventually threw a four-yard pass to Vance McDonald in the second quarter, ending the run at 22:30.

==== Week 14: at Detroit Lions ====
Week Fourteen: Chicago Bears at Detroit Lions – Game summary

Quarter	1	2	3	4	Total
Bears	3	0	7	7	**17**
**Lions**	0	10	3	7	**20**

at Ford Field, Detroit, Michigan

- Date: December 11
- Game time: 12:00 pm. CST
- Game weather: Played indoors (dome stadium)
- Game attendance: 61,726
- Referee: Jeff Triplette
- TV announcers (CBS): Spero Dedes and Solomon Wilcots
- Recap, Game book

Game information

**First quarter**

- CHI – Connor Barth 38-yard field goal, 1:27. Bears 3–0. **Drive: 12 plays, 60 yards, 7:17.**

**Second quarter**

- DET – Matt Prater 29-yard field goal, 4:17. Tied 3–3. **Drive: 12 plays, 74 yards, 6:58.**
- DET – Anquan Boldin 16-yard pass from Matthew Stafford (Matt Prater kick), 0:19. Lions 10–3. **Drive: 10 plays, 81 yards, 2:07.**

**Third quarter**

- DET – Matt Prater 54-yard field goal, 5:35. Lions 13–3. **Drive: 10 plays, 44 yards, 6:04.**
- CHI – Cameron Meredith 31-yard pass from Matt Barkley (Connor Barth kick), 3:19. Lions 13–10. **Drive: 4 plays, 75 yards, 2:16.**

**Fourth quarter**

- CHI – Cre'Von LeBlanc 24-yard interception return (Connor Barth kick), 7:07. Bears 17–13.
- DET – Matthew Stafford 7-yard run (Matt Prater kick), 3:16. Lions 20–17. **Drive: 7 plays, 76 yards, 3:50.**

**Top passers**

- CHI – Matt Barkley – 20/32, 212 yards, TD
- DET – Matthew Stafford – 21/35, 223 yards, TD, 2 INT

**Top rushers**

- CHI – Jordan Howard – 13 rushes, 86 yards
- DET – Dwayne Washington – 16 rushes, 64 yards

**Top receivers**

- CHI – Cameron Meredith – 6 receptions, 72 yards, TD
- DET – Golden Tate – 6 receptions, 58 yards

The Bears traveled to Detroit for the second game of the season against the Lions, who led the division with an 8–4 record. Matt Barkley, who played in rowdy stadiums during his college career at USC, faced a Ford Field that Jeff Joniak stated would be agitated by the Lions' recent success, describing the atmospheres as "just different in the NFL." Barkley's offense also took on a defense that restricted its last six opponents to less than 20 points and prefer to blitz. As such, Joniak wrote the Bears' rushing offense would be crucial in the game. Defensively, the Bears needed to contain the Lions after catches, a category in which Detroit ranked fifth in the NFL, and as such need to ensure solid tackles. The Lions offense favored the pass, throwing 64 percent of the time, the fifth-highest, while Matthew Stafford had thrown 25 percent of his passes to running backs. Running back Theo Riddick caught 53 catches, meaning the Bears needed to apply pressure to him. As Joniak described it, the odds were "all stacked against the Bears", but an upset victory would give the Bears a 3–1 record in the NFC North, which would help John Fox and the Bears "turn negatives into positives by winning in the division to prop up what has turned into a rebuilding season."

Connor Barth scored the first points of the game when he kicked a 38-yard field goal on the Bears' first drive. The Lions responded in the second quarter with Matt Prater's 29-yard field goal, followed by Stafford completing a 19-yard touchdown pass to Anquan Boldin with 19 seconds left in the first half; Boldin capitalized on Harold Jones-Quartey falling while attempting to cover him for the score. In the third quarter, Prater extended the gap to ten points when he kicked a 54-yard field goal. Barkley threw a 31-yard touchdown pass to Cameron Meredith on the Bears' resulting drive to draw the Bears within three points. Chicago regained the ball when Demontre Hurst intercepted a Stafford pass that deflected off Golden Tate in the endzone for a touchback. Although the Bears were unable to score on the following series, they took the lead when Cre'Von LeBlanc intercepted Stafford's pass for Boldin and returned it 24 yards for a touchdown. With 3:17 left in the game, Stafford scored on a seven-yard touchdown run to give Detroit the lead once again. Barkley attempted to lead the Bears offense down the field in hopes of recording a game-tying field goal, but a 27-yard pass to Meredith to the Lions' 16-yard line was nullified by a holding penalty on Charles Leno. Barkley then threw a 30-yard pass to Daniel Braverman, which was also overruled by a holding penalty on Ted Larsen. Now faced with a first-and-30 situation, Barkley completed a five-yard pass to Daniel Brown, followed by an incomplete pass to Deonte Thompson. Needing 25 yards for a first down, Barkley's pass for Meredith drew the Bears to 11 yards on fourth down with 13 seconds left. Barkley threw a pass to Josh Bellamy, but it hit his right shoulder while he was facing Darius Slay, resulting in a turnover on downs as the Bears fell 20–17.

The loss eliminated the Bears from postseason contention for the sixth consecutive year. The Bears have lost four consecutive games at Ford Field, their longest skid in Detroit since dropping six in a row at the Pontiac Silverdome between 1994 and 1999, while also dropping to 0–7 in away games for the first time since 1974.

==== Week 15: vs. Green Bay Packers ====
Week Fifteen: Green Bay Packers at Chicago Bears – Game summary

Quarter	1	2	3	4	Total
**Packers**	7	3	17	3	**30**
Bears	0	10	0	17	**27**

at Soldier Field, Chicago, Illinois

- Date: December 18
- Game time: 12:00 pm. CST
- Game weather: 11 °F (−12 °C), sunny
- Game attendance: 61,137
- Referee: Ronald Torbert
- TV announcers (Fox): Kevin Burkhardt, John Lynch and Pam Oliver
- Recap, Game book

Game information

**First quarter**

- GB – Ty Montgomery 4-yard run (Mason Crosby kick), 10:02. Packers 7–0. **Drive: 9 plays, 73 yards, 5:03.**

**Second quarter**

- CHI – Connor Barth 26-yard field goal, 6:05. Packers 7–3. **Drive: 10 plays, 64 yards, 5:12.**
- CHI – Josh Bellamy 10-yard pass from Matt Barkley (Connor Barth kick), 2:23. Bears 10–7. **Drive: 4 plays, 55 yards, 2:08.**
- GB – Mason Crosby 34-yard field goal, 0:37. Tied 10–10. **Drive: 9 plays, 69 yards, 1:44.**

**Third quarter**

- GB – Mason Crosby 18-yard field goal, 11:15. Packers 13–10. **Drive: 6 plays, 16 yards, 3:43.**
- GB – Ty Montgomery 3-yard run (Mason Crosby kick), 4:57. Packers 20–10. **Drive: 7 plays, 58 yards, 4:35.**
- GB – Christine Michael 42-yard run (Mason Crosby kick), 1:13. Packers 27–10. **Drive: 2 plays, 45 yards, 0:52.**

**Fourth quarter**

- CHI – Alshon Jeffery 8-yard pass from Matt Barkley (Connor Barth kick), 13:31. Packers 27–17. **Drive: 6 plays, 75 yards, 2:36.**
- CHI – Jordan Howard 9-yard run (Connor Barth kick), 7:40. Packers 27–24. **Drive: 9 plays, 78 yards, 3:37.**
- CHI – Connor Barth 22-yard field goal, 1:23. Tied 27–27. **Drive: 14 plays, 75 yards, 4:23.**
- GB – Mason Crosby 32-yard field goal, 0:02. Packers 30–27. **Drive: 5 plays, 59 yards, 1:19.**

**Top passers**

- GB – Aaron Rodgers – 19/31, 252 yards
- CHI – Matt Barkley – 30/43, 362 yards, 2 TD, 3 INT

**Top rushers**

- GB – Ty Montgomery – 16 rushes, 162 yards, 2 TD
- CHI – Jordan Howard – 17 rushes, 90 yards, TD

**Top receivers**

- GB – Jordy Nelson – 7 receptions, 124 yards
- CHI – Cameron Meredith – 9 receptions, 104 yards

The week fifteen matchup between the Bears and Packers featured a forecast weather of 1 °F (−17 °C) with 15 miles per hour (24 km/h) winds, the coldest game in Chicago. The previous record was 2 °F (−17 °C) in a Bears–Packers game in 2008, won by the Bears. The game ultimately featured temperatures of 11 °F (−12 °C). Chicago's rushing unit took on a Green Bay defense that was ranked sixth in rushing plays of at least ten yards with 30, and fourth in average first down rushing yards with 3.72 yards. Additionally, the Packers run defense was one of thirteen teams in the NFL to allow less than 100 yards per game, while also forcing 44 runs for negative yards, the fifth-most in the league. Despite this success, Jeff Joniak stated the Bears should utilize Jordan Howard, as the Bears averaged five rushing yards on first-down, while Howard recorded most than three yards after contact and only 9.8 percent of his runs had resulted in negative yards. Regarding Chicago's defense, Joniak wrote it should "remain wary of [Aaron] Rodgers", who led the league in touchdown passes with 32 and threw only eight interceptions. On third down, the Packers offense ranked second with a 47.1 percent conversion rate. According to Joniak, the primary intangible of the game would be the 'scout's eye", as scouts would be using the last three games of the season to evaluate players, as those "who continue to compete with passion and toughness will earn high marks for not allowing the adversity of the season, the playing conditions or circumstances dictate the extent to which they invest themselves."

The Packers opened the game with a score on the opening drive courtesy of Ty Montgomery's four-yard run. After three drives that ended with punts, the Packers were threatening to enter the Bears' red zone when Rodgers was sacked by Pernell McPhee to force a turnover on downs. Connor Barth kicked a 26-yard field goal and the Bears took the lead later in the second quarter when Matt Barkley threw a ten-yard touchdown pass to Josh Bellamy. The Packers tied the game with Mason Crosby's 34-yard field goal. On the last play of the first half, Barkley's Hail Mary pass was intercepted by Micah Hyde. From there, the Bears began to struggle; Barkley was strip-sacked by Julius Peppers and was later intercepted by Ha Ha Clinton-Dix. As a result, the Packers scored 20 unanswered points off Crosby's 18-yard field goal, Montgomery and Christine Michael's runs of three and 42 yards, respectively. In the fourth quarter, the Bears began to rally when Barkley threw an eight-yard touchdown pass to Alshon Jeffery, followed by Howard's nine-yard touchdown run. Barth tied the game at 27–27 with a 22-yard field goal. However, Rodgers threw a 60-yard pass to Jordy Nelson, which set up Crosby's game-winning 32-yard field goal as time expired.

==== Week 16: vs. Washington Redskins ====
Week Sixteen: Washington Redskins at Chicago Bears – Game summary

Quarter	1	2	3	4	Total
**Redskins**	14	10	7	10	**41**
Bears	0	14	0	7	**21**

at Soldier Field, Chicago, Illinois

- Date: December 24
- Game time: 12:00 pm. CST
- Game weather: 37 °F (3 °C) cloudy, steady temps
- Game attendance: 57,953
- Referee: Brad Allen
- TV announcers (Fox): Dick Stockton, David Diehl and Kristina Pink
- Recap, Game book

Game information

**First quarter**

- WAS – Chris Thompson 7-yard run (Dustin Hopkins kick), 7:43. Redskins 7–0. **Drive: 8 plays, 65 yards, 3:35.**
- WAS – Chris Thompson 17-yard pass from Kirk Cousins (Dustin Hopkins kick), 0:57. Redskins 14–0. **Drive: 5 plays, 80 yards, 2:35.**

**Second quarter**

- WAS – Dustin Hopkins 29-yard field goal, 10:07. Redskins 17–0. **Drive: 9 plays, 88 yards, 4:40.**
- CHI – Jeremy Langford 1-yard run (Connor Barth kick), 6:20. Redskins 17–7. **Drive: 8 plays, 75 yards, 3:47.**
- WAS – Kirk Cousins 9-yard run (Dustin Hopkins kick), 1:41. Redskins 24–7. **Drive: 9 plays, 91 yards, 4:39.**
- CHI – Cameron Meredith 21-yard pass from Matt Barkley (Connor Barth kick), 0:34. Redskins 24–14. **Drive: 4 plays, 75 yards, 1:07.**

**Third quarter**

- WAS – Kirk Cousins 1-yard run (Dustin Hopkins kick), 3:05. Redskins 31–14. **Drive: 13 plays, 55 yards, 6:37.**

**Fourth quarter**

- WAS – Dustin Hopkins 20-yard field goal, 12:53. Redskins 34–14. **Drive: 4 plays, 8 yards, 1:43.**
- CHI – Deonte Thompson 3-yard pass from Matt Barkley (Connor Barth kick), 1:21. Redskins 34–21. **Drive: 11 plays, 85 yards, 5:05.**
- WAS – Mack Brown 61-yard run (Dustin Hopkins kick), 0:57. Redskins 41–21. **Drive: 3 plays, 67 yards, 0:24.**

**Top passers**

- WAS – Kirk Cousins – 19/28, 270 yards, TD
- CHI – Matt Barkley – 24/40, 323 yards, 2 TD, 5 INT

**Top rushers**

- WAS – Mack Brown – 8 rushes, 82 yards, TD
- CHI – Jordan Howard – 18 rushes, 119 yards

**Top receivers**

- WAS – DeSean Jackson – 5 receptions, 114 yards
- CHI – Cameron Meredith – 9 receptions, 135 yards, TD

The final home game of the year featured the Bears hosting the Washington Redskins, who led the all-time series 26–23–1. To attack Washington's defense, Jeff Joniak stated the Bears should utilize Jordan Howard; Howard, who was approaching 1,200 rushing yards on the season, took on a Redskins run defense that ranked 27th in percentage of runs at least four yards and 30th in first down run defense with 4.98 yards per carry. As for Chicago's defense, it faced a Washington offense that ranked third in the league. It also contained plenty of speed with players like receivers DeSean Jackson, who recorded three 100-yard games in the last four; Jamison Crowder, who led the Redskins with seven receiving touchdowns; Pierre Garçon, who led the team with 71 catches; tight ends Jordan Reed and Vernon Davis combined for 104 catches and seven touchdowns. Joniak added the run defense, who struggled against the Packers last week, needed to watch running back Rob Kelly, who ran for 137 yards against Green Bay five weeks earlier. Joniak also wrote the Bears had provided a challenge for playoff-contending teams, and one like the Redskins, who were "on a short week, off a loss and on the road," was "susceptible against the feisty Bears."

Chris Thompson scored the first points of the game for the Redskins with a seven-yard touchdown run. Matt Barkley attempted to lead the Bears in response, spurred by 18-yard passes to Deonte Thompson and Alshon Jeffery along with Howard's 23-yard run. However, Barkley threw two incomplete passes, which resulted in Connor Barth attempting a 22-yard field goal, but the kick was blocked by Preston Smith. Thompson ran for a 17-yard touchdown on the next drive; when Chicago entered Washington territory once again, Barkley's pass for Josh Bellamy went into triple coverage and was intercepted by Bashaud Breeland at the one-yard line. Dustin Hopkins later kicked a 29-yard field goal. The next three drives of the game ended with a touchdown: Jeremy Langford ran for a one-yard touchdown, Kirk Cousins recorded a nine-yard touchdown run and Barkley threw a 21-yard touchdown pass to Meredith. Barkley struggled early in the second half when he threw interceptions on each of the Bears' first four drives of the half to Josh Norman (twice), Breeland and Will Blackmon; the Redskins converted two of the picks into scores with Cousins' one-yard touchdown run and Hopkins' 20-yard field goal. Although Barkley threw a three-yard touchdown pass to Thompson, Mack Brown's 61-yard touchdown run increased the margin between the two teams to 20 points as the Bears lost 41–21.

With the loss, the Bears fell to 3–12 for the first time since the NFL expanded to 16 games in 1978. The 41 points allowed were the most since the team allowed 48 in 2015 to the Cardinals.

==== Week 17: at Minnesota Vikings ====
Week Seventeen: Chicago Bears at Minnesota Vikings – Game summary

Quarter	1	2	3	4	Total
Bears	0	10	0	0	**10**
**Vikings**	7	17	0	14	**38**

at U.S. Bank Stadium, Minneapolis, Minnesota

- Date: January 1, 2017
- Game time: 12:00 pm. CST
- Game weather: Played indoors (dome stadium)
- Game attendance: 66,808
- Referee: Terry McAulay
- TV announcers (Fox): Dick Stockton, David Diehl and Kristina Pink
- Recap, Game book

Game information

**First quarter**

- MIN – Jerick McKinnon 16-yard pass from Sam Bradford (Kai Forbath kick), 11:36. Vikings 7–0. **Drive: 6 plays, 70 yards, 3:24.**

**Second quarter**

- MIN – Kai Forbath 21-yard field goal, 14:53. Vikings 10–0. **Drive: 14 plays, 93 yards, 7:33.**
- MIN – Kyle Rudolph 22-yard pass from Sam Bradford (Kai Forbath kick), 12:51. Vikings 17–0. **Drive: 3 plays, 35 yards, 1:22.**
- CHI – Matt Barkley 2-yard pass from Cameron Meredith (Connor Barth kick), 1:48. Vikings 17–7. **Drive: 17 plays, 85 yards, 7:56.**
- MIN – Jarius Wright 1-yard pass from Sam Bradford (Kai Forbath kick), 0:18. Vikings 24–7. **Drive: 5 plays, 21 yards, 0:42.**
- CHI – Connor Barth 29-yard field goal, 0:00. Vikings 24–10. **Drive: 2 plays, 31 yards, 0:18.**

**Third quarter**

- No scoring plays

**Fourth quarter**

- MIN – Jerick McKinnon 10-yard run (Kai Forbath kick), 12:11. Vikings 31–10. **Drive: 4 plays, 40 yards, 1:56.**
- MIN – Everson Griffen 20-yard fumble return (Kai Forbath kick), 9:51. Vikings 38–10.

**Top passers**

- CHI – Matt Barkley – 10/14, 125 yards, 2 INT
- MIN – Sam Bradford – 25/33, 250 yards, 3 TD, INT

**Top rushers**

- CHI – Jordan Howard – 23 rushes, 135 yards
- MIN – Jerick McKinnon – 16 rushes, 89 yards, TD

**Top receivers**

- CHI – Cameron Meredith – 4 receptions, 61 yards
- MIN – Kyle Rudolph – 11 receptions, 117 yards, TD

The Bears visited U.S. Bank Stadium for the final game of the 2016 season against the Vikings. Held on New Year's Day, this marked the fourth New Year game for the Bears, all of which had been played in Minnesota; the Bears were 2–1 in such games. The Bears offense took on a Vikings defense that ranked second in the NFL in quarterback knockdowns; to contain the pass rush, Jeff Joniak stated the Bears should utilize Jordan Howard, who ranked second in the league in runs of at least ten yards. Defensively, the Bears needed to cover the Vikings' receivers; while the Vikings were ranked 28th in yards gained at the point of catch, they are more effective in gaining yards after the catch. Additionally, since the Bears' Monday night victory against the Vikings earlier in the season, Minnesota had gone 2–7. Joniak added the Bears should "leave them a little reminder of what's coming around the corner in 2017 by playing well and beating the Vikings in their home stadium."

The Vikings scored first on Sam Bradford throwing a swing pass to Jerick McKinnon, who beat Adrian Amos for the 19-yard touchdown. Matt Barkley led the Bears into the Vikings' red zone, where his pass for Alshon Jeffery was underthrown and intercepted by Xavier Rhodes, which the Vikings converted into Kai Forbath's 21-yard field goal. Two plays into the Bears' ensuing drive, Jeremy Langford fumbled when MyCole Pruitt bumped into him and Anthony Harris recovered the loose ball. Minnesota converted it into another score when Bradford threw a 22-yard touchdown pass to Kyle Rudolph, who escaped Harold Jones-Quartey to make the score. Both teams punted on their next drives before the Bears scored for the first time in the game; Langford took the snap before handing the ball off to Cameron Meredith, who passed to Barkley for the two-yard touchdown. Although the Bears forced the Vikings to punt on their next possession, Bralon Addison muffed the following punt and Viking Jayron Kearse recovered; the takeaway later resulted in Bradford's one-yard touchdown pass to Jarius Wright. On the final kickoff return of the first half, Deonte Thompson returned it 61 yards. Barkley then threw a 31-yard pass to Meredith, which set up Connor Barth's 29-yard field goal. The first two drives of the third quarter ended with an interception as Barkley's pass for Meredith was intercepted by Trae Waynes, followed by Bradford's pass for Cordarrelle Patterson being intercepted by Cre'Von LeBlanc. However, the Bears were stopped on fourth down and turned the ball over, which resulted in Minnesota scoring again on McKinnon's ten-yard touchdown run in the fourth quarter. The Vikings' Everson Griffen recovered a fumble on the next driver and returned it 20 yards for a touchdown. David Fales replaced Barkley on the next series, but was unable to lead the Bears on a scoring drive as the Bears fell 38–10.

Chicago ended the year with a 3–13 record, the worst in team history since they went 1–13 in 1969 and the worst since the NFL's expansion to a 16-game schedule. The Bears also lost all eight away games for the first time since they went 0–7 on the road in 1974. Yet ironically that same year (2016), Chicago's baseball team, Cubs, won the World Series. They had their best season in history.

== Standings ==
=== Division ===
NFC North
	W	L	T	PCT	DIV	CONF	PF	PA	STK
^{(4)} Green Bay Packers	10	6	0	.625	5–1	8–4	432	388	W6
^{(6)} Detroit Lions	9	7	0	.563	3–3	7–5	346	358	L3
Minnesota Vikings	8	8	0	.500	2–4	5–7	327	307	W1
Chicago Bears	3	13	0	.188	2–4	3–9	279	399	L4

=== Conference ===
NFC
#	Team	Division	W	L	T	PCT	DIV	CONF	SOS	SOV	STK
Division leaders
1	Dallas Cowboys	East	13	3	0	.813	3–3	9–3	.471	.440	L1
2	Atlanta Falcons	South	11	5	0	.688	5–1	9–3	.480	.452	W4
3	Seattle Seahawks	West	10	5	1	.656	3–2–1	6–5–1	.441	.425	W1
4	Green Bay Packers	North	10	6	0	.625	5–1	8–4	.508	.453	W6
Wild Cards
5	New York Giants	East	11	5	0	.688	4–2	8–4	.486	.455	W1
6 (Note: Detroit finished ahead of Tampa Bay for the No. 6 seed and qualified for the last playoff spot based on record vs. common opponents—Detroit's cumulative record against Chicago, Dallas, Los Angeles and New Orleans was 3–2, while Tampa Bay's cumulative record against the same four teams was 2–3.)	Detroit Lions	North	9	7	0	.563	3–3	7–5	.475	.392	L3
Did not qualify for the postseason
7	Tampa Bay Buccaneers	South	9	7	0	.563	4–2	7–5	.492	.434	W1
8	Washington Redskins	East	8	7	1	.531	3–3	6–6	.516	.430	L1
9	Minnesota Vikings	North	8	8	0	.500	2–4	5–7	.492	.457	W1
10	Arizona Cardinals	West	7	8	1	.469	4–1–1	6–5–1	.463	.366	W2
11 (Note: New Orleans finished ahead of Philadelphia based on better record vs. conference opponents.)	New Orleans Saints	South	7	9	0	.438	2–4	6–6	.523	.393	L1
12	Philadelphia Eagles	East	7	9	0	.438	2–4	5–7	.559	.518	W2
13	Carolina Panthers	South	6	10	0	.375	1–5	5–7	.518	.354	L2
14	Los Angeles Rams	West	4	12	0	.250	2–4	3–9	.504	.500	L7
15	Chicago Bears	North	3	13	0	.188	2–4	3–9	.521	.396	L4
16	San Francisco 49ers	West	2	14	0	.125	2–4	2–10	.504	.250	L1
Tiebreakers (Note: When breaking ties for three or more teams under the NFL's rules, they are first broken within divisions, then comparing only the highest-ranked remaining team from each division.)

== Statistics ==
The Bears struggled with injuries in 2016, with a league-high 19 players on injured reserve by the end of the season; since John Fox and Ryan Pace joined the team in 2015, the Bears had 32 players on IR, more than twice the number during the two-year tenure of previous GM Phil Emery and HC Marc Trestman. Of the 19, 13 players started at least one game for the Bears in 2016. On 1,010 total offensive plays, left tackle Charles Leno Jr. was the only Bear (and one of just 27 NFL players) to participate in all of his team's plays, while end Akiem Hicks was the only defensive player to start all sixteen games.

Offensively, Chicago excelled on first down as the unit averaged 7.58 yards, second-most in the NFL behind the Falcons' 8.1 yards; the Bears also averaged 6.97 yards per run and 8.16 yards per pass, among the highest in the league. While the team averaged 365.5 yards per game (15th), they also averaged just 17.4 points per game (28th).

On defense, the Bears were unable to record turnovers as they set the NFL record for the fewest in a season with 11, including just three forced fumbles. The pass defense allowed 6.79 yards per play, ranking among the worst in the league, but allowed just 93 yards after the catch per game, second-fewest in the NFL behind the Patriots.

In terms of averages, the Bears' special teams ranked 19th in the NFL in punt return, 18th in kickoff return, 25th in gross punting and 29th in net punting. In coverage, Chicago allowed a league-worst 12.8 yards per punt return and a league-most 94.3 percent of field goals to be converted.

=== Position reviews ===
At quarterback, the Bears alternated between three players due to injuries; Jay Cutler and Brian Hoyer started five games each, while Matt Barkley started six. After injuring his thumb in week two and missing the next five games, Cutler made his return in Minnesota with a touchdown pass. He struggled in the next two games against the Buccaneers and Giants before his season ended with a shoulder injury. In 2016, Cutler threw for 1,059 yards with four touchdowns, five interceptions and a 78.1 passer rating. Second-stringer Hoyer threw for 300 yards in four straight games, the first Bear to do so in team history, with a season total of 1,445 yards with six touchdowns, no interceptions and a 98.0 passer rating. However, the Bears went 1–3 during his stint before he suffered a season-ending arm injury in Green Bay. Third-string quarterback Connor Shaw's leg injury in the preseason resulted in Barkley becoming the new signal-caller for the Bears. he threw for three touchdown passes in the six-point loss against the Titans, followed by leading the Bears to a win over the 49ers and recorded another touchdown pass in a close loss to the Lions. Of his 216 pass attempts, 89 went for a first down (41.2 percent), trailing only Atlanta's Matt Ryan (44.6) for the highest percentage in the league. His success dropped in the final three games when he allowed a combined ten turnovers. Barkley ended the year having thrown for eight touchdowns and 14 interceptions. The quarterbacks threw a combined 13 interceptions in the second half during the 2016 season, second-most in the league behind the Jets (19).

Entering the 2016 season, rookie Jordan Howard was the third-string running back behind Jeremy Langford and Ka'Deem Carey. After injuries sidelined both of them in week five, Howard became the starter and ended the year with 1,313 rushing yards, breaking the Bears rookie rushing record of 1,296 set by Matt Forte in 2008. The 1,313 yards were the second-most in the NFL behind Dallas rookie Ezekiel Elliott. He joined Walter Payton in 1977 as the only Bears players to have at least 1,300 rushing yards; Howard also averaged at least five yards per carry in a season and set a Bears rookie record with seven games where he had at least 100 yards rushing, two more than the previous record of five by Beattie Feathers in 1934 and Rashaan Salaam in 1995. In his three starts, Langford ran for 116 yards and ended the year with 200 rushing yards and four touchdowns, while Carey had 32 carries for 126 yards.

The Bears' primary receivers suffered from various issues during the season: Alshon Jeffery, who caught 52 passes for 821 yards and two touchdowns, was suspended for four games after week ten; Kevin White, who set the team record for the most receptions in the first four games of a season with 19, broke his fibula in week four; Eddie Royal, who caught 33 passes for 369 yards and two touchdowns in addition to a 65-yard punt return touchdown in week two, played only nine games due to a broken toe; Marquess Wilson was on the physically-unable-to-perform list for the first six games for a foot injury and played only three games. The absences forced Cameron Meredith, Josh Bellamy and Deonte Thompson into action; Meredith led the Bears with 66 catches, 888 yards and four touchdowns; Bellamy, who struggled with drops during the season, had 19 receptions for 282 yards and one touchdown; Thompson scored two touchdowns on 22 catches for 249 yards. The tight end position was also affected by injuries; starter Zach Miller was placed on injured reserve for a foot injury in week eleven; prior to his injury, he led the Bears in receptions (47) and touchdowns (four) in addition to a career-high 486 receiving yards. Backup Daniel Brown caught 16 passes for 124 yards and a touchdown, while Logan Paulsen had three receptions for 15 yards and Ben Braunecker recorded four catches for 41 yards.

Rookie Cody Whitehair anchored the offensive line at center, a position he had never played in college; he was a left guard during the offseason before he was moved to center when the Bears signed Josh Sitton. At center, Whitehair started all sixteen games and allowed just one sack. Although he joined the Bears a week before the regular season began, Sitton flourished at left guard and made the Pro Bowl. However, right guard Kyle Long suffered an ankle injury in week ten and was placed on injured reserve, while center Hroniss Grasu tore his ACL during the offseason and did not play in 2016. Backup guards Ted Larsen and Eric Kush excelled as depth when Sitton and Long were injured, allowing just one sack against the Vikings in week eight.

On the defensive line, newcomer Akiem Hicks led all defensive linemen in tackles (71), sacks (seven), pass breakups (three) and forced fumbles (two). Tackle Eddie Goldman also showed signs of success, but struggled with injuries and was placed on injured reserve after week fourteen. Mitch Unrein and Cornelius Washington recorded career-bests in tackles with 33 and 27, respectively, while Unrein also had a sack. Goldman's replacement C. J. Wilson had eleven tackles and a sack.

Chicago's new linebacker trio of Danny Trevathan, Jerrell Freeman and Leonard Floyd performed well but missed a combined fifteen games. Trevathan missed two games early in the season with a thumb injury before he ruptured his patellar tendon in week twelve, ruling him out for the remainder of the year. Freeman led the team in tackles and tackles-for-loss with 127 and seven, respectively, but was suspended for four games after week eleven. Floyd, who suffered a calf injury and two concussions during the year and did not play in four games, recorded 33 tackles, seven sacks, a forced fumble, a fumble recovery and six tackles-for-loss. The seven sacks ranked third-highest by a Bears rookie behind Mark Anderson's twelve in 2006 and Brian Urlacher's eight in 2000. Outside linebackers Pernell McPhee, Willie Young and Sam Acho recorded 28 tackles and four sacks, 59 tackles and a team-best 7.5 sacks, and 40 tackles and a sack, respectively. In six starts as a substitute for Trevathan, rookie Nick Kwiatkoski had 43 tackles, a sack and five tackles-for-loss.

Cornerback Tracy Porter was the top player in the Bears' secondary, recording 48 tackles, two interceptions and 13 pass breakups despite a knee injury. Rookie Cre'Von LeBlanc played opposite Porter and recorded similar stats with 46 tackles, two picks and 13 pass breakups. While safety Adrian Amos recorded 60 tackles, his fellow safety Harold Jones-Quartey (who led the team with 82 tackles) was replaced by Deon Bush during the year. With the secondary struggling to force turnovers, general manager Ryan Pace commented, "I honestly think we need to add more playmakers to our secondary. We need to add more ball skills to our secondary. That's on me and we'll do that."

Kicker Connor Barth had trouble converting his field goals early in the season, making just four of his first seven attempts, before he improved to making fourteen of sixteen. With 18 of 23 kicks converted, he ranked 27th in field goal percentage. Punter Pat O'Donnell averaged 44 yards on 68 punts with 24 punts going inside the opponents' red zone and five touchbacks. On kickoff returns, Deonte Thompson led the NFL with 35, while ranking second with 810 yards and an average of 23 yards. In addition to a touchdown in week two, punt returner Eddie Royal had an average of 8.7 yards on 19 returns. Sherrick McManis led all Bears gunners in tackles with 13.

== Awards and records ==
For the second straight year, no Bears were named to the Pro Bowl. On January 11, 2017, Jordan Howard was named as a replacement for injured Arizona Cardinals running back David Johnson. Howard joined Gale Sayers as the only Bears rookie running backs to make the Pro Bowl. Josh Sitton was later named to the Pro Bowl, replacing Green Bay's T. J. Lang.

In January 2017, the Pro Football Writers Association named Jordan Howard, Cody Whitehair and Leonard Floyd to the All-Rookie Team. The three were also named to NFL Media senior analyst Gil Brandt's All-Rookie Team.
