= Mack Brown (running back) =

American football player (born 1991)

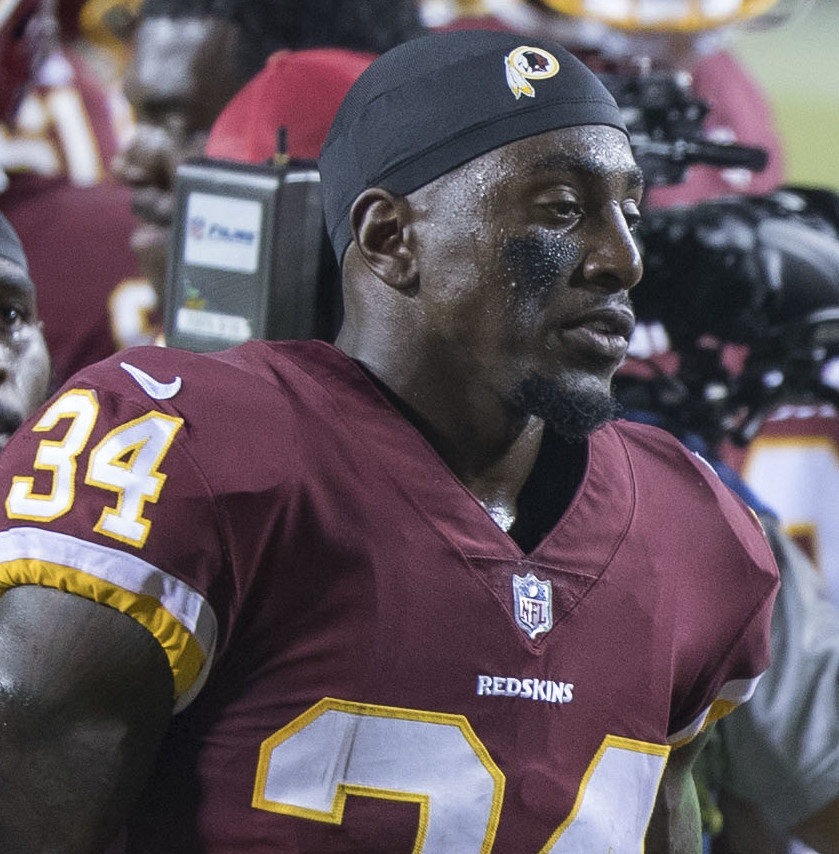
- Brown with the Washington Redskins in 2017

No. 31, 34
- Position: Running back

Personal information
- Born: September 24, 1991 (age 35); Lithonia, Georgia, U.S.
- Listed height: 5 ft 11 in (1.80 m)
- Listed weight: 213 lb (97 kg)

Career information
- High school: Martin Luther King Jr. (Lithonia)
- College: Florida
- NFL draft: 2015: undrafted

Career history
- Houston Texans (2015)*; Washington Redskins (2015–2017); Minnesota Vikings (2017); Washington Redskins (2018)*; Oakland Raiders (2019)*; Tampa Bay Vipers (2020)
- * Offseason or practice squad member only

Career NFL statistics
- Rushing yards: 111
- Rushing average: 6.9
- Rushing touchdowns: 1
- Receptions: 2
- Receiving yards: 9
- Stats at Pro Football Reference

Mack Brown (born September 24, 1991) is an American former professional football player who was a running back in the National Football League (NFL). He played college football for the Florida Gators, and signed with the Houston Texans as an undrafted free agent in 2015. He has also played for the Minnesota Vikings.

== Early life ==
Brown played high school football at Martin Luther King Jr. High School in Lithonia, Georgia.

== College career ==
Brown played college football for the Florida Gators from 2010 to 2014, where he appeared in 49 games with two starts. In the 2010 season, he appeared in two games and had three carries for 23 rushing yards. In the 2011 season, he appeared in four games and had 12 carries for 42 rushing yards. In the 2012 season, he appeared in nine games and had 25 carries for 102 rushing yards. His role in the offense expanded in the 2013 season. In the season opener against Toledo, he had 25 carries for 112 rushing yards and two rushing touchdowns. In the 2013 season, he had 148 carries for 548 rushing yards and four rushing touchdowns in 12 games. In his final collegiate season in 2014, he had 22 carries for 95 rushing yards in seven games. Over his college career, he recorded 805 yards on 210 rushing attempts with four rushing touchdowns and served as a key member of the Gators' special teams unit.

== Professional career ==
=== Houston Texans ===
After trying out their rookie mini-camp, Brown signed with the Houston Texans on May 11, 2015. He was waived by the Texans on June 2, 2015.

=== Washington Redskins ===
On July 25, 2015, Brown was signed by the Washington Redskins. He was released on September 5, 2015, and was re-signed to the practice squad on October 20, 2015. He was released again on November 19, 2015, and re-signed back to the practice squad on December 10, 2015. On January 11, 2016, Brown signed a futures contract with the Redskins.

In the 2016 preseason, Brown led the league in rushing with 227 yards. In the Redskins' preseason finale against the Tampa Bay Buccaneers, Brown rushed for 149 yards, highlighted by a 60-yard touchdown in the first half of the game. However, despite a strong preseason, he was released by the Redskins on September 3, 2016, and was signed to the practice squad the next day. He was promoted to the active roster on October 28, 2016. Having only played special teams in previous games, Brown recorded his first career carries at running back in a Week 16 win against the Chicago Bears. He recorded 82 yards off of eight carries, which included a 61-yard touchdown run, his first career touchdown.

On October 28, 2017, Brown was waived by the Redskins after appearing in three games in the regular season.

=== Minnesota Vikings ===
On October 30, 2017, Brown was claimed off waivers by the Minnesota Vikings. He appeared in one game for the Vikings in 2017. Overall, he finished the 2017 season with eight carries for 29 rushing yards and an 11-yard reception with both the Redskins and Vikings.

On September 1, 2018, Brown was waived/injured by the Vikings and was placed on injured reserve. He was released on September 7, 2018.

=== Washington Redskins (second stint) ===
On October 2, 2018, Brown was signed to the Washington Redskins' practice squad. He was released on November 13, 2018.

=== Oakland Raiders ===
On August 3, 2019, Brown was signed by the Oakland Raiders. He was waived during final roster cuts on August 30, 2019.

=== Tampa Bay Vipers ===
Brown signed with the Tampa Bay Vipers of the XFL on January 9, 2020. He was waived on February 18, 2020.
