= Jonathan Anderson (American football) =

American football player (born 1991)

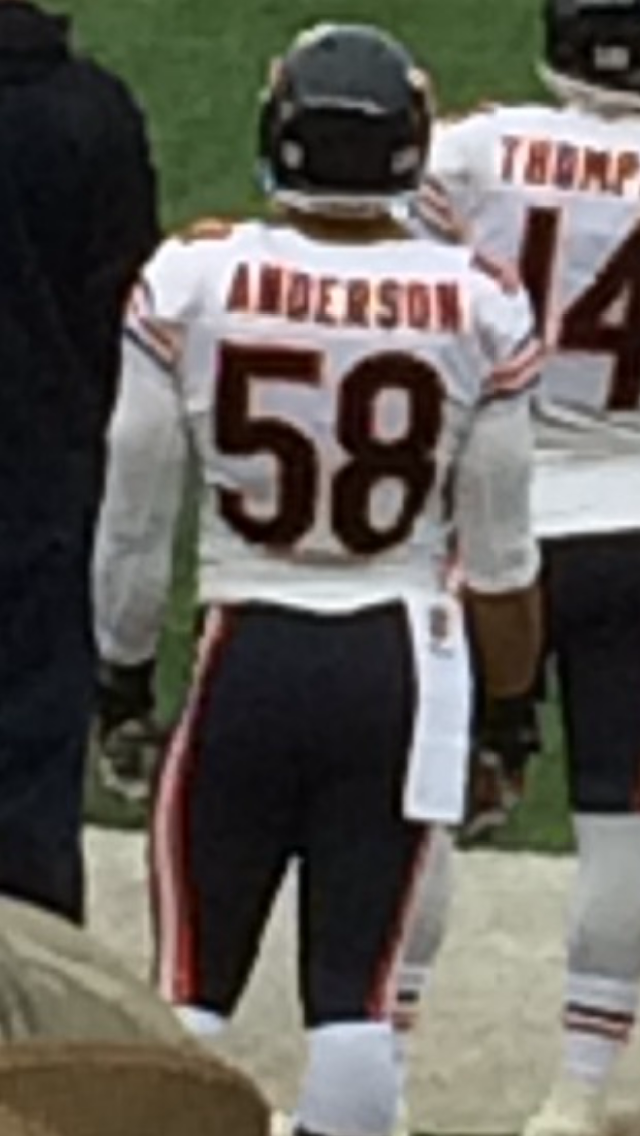
- Anderson in 2015

No. 47, 58, 45, 55
- Position: Linebacker

Personal information
- Born: October 27, 1991 (age 35); Corpus Christi, Texas, U.S.
- Listed height: 6 ft 1 in (1.85 m)
- Listed weight: 235 lb (107 kg)

Career information
- High school: Mary Carroll (Corpus Christi)
- College: TCU
- NFL draft: 2015: undrafted

Career history
- Chicago Bears (2015–2018); Arizona Cardinals (2018); New York Giants (2019)

Career NFL statistics
- Total tackles: 53
- Interceptions: 1
- Stats at Pro Football Reference

Jonathan Anderson (born October 27, 1991) is an American former professional football player who was a linebacker in the National Football League (NFL). He was signed by the Chicago Bears as an undrafted free agent in 2015. He played college football for the TCU Horned Frogs.

== Professional career ==
=== Chicago Bears ===
On May 3, 2015, Anderson signed with the Chicago Bears as an undrafted free agent. On September 5, Anderson was waived but resigned to the practice squad three days later on September 8. He was promoted to the active roster on October 14. Anderson recorded his first career interception against the Detroit Lions on October 18, 2015. Anderson recorded his first career forced fumble against the Tampa Bay Buccaneers on December 27, 2015. At the end of the 2015 season, Anderson recorded 36 tackles, 2 passes defensed, and 1 interception. He and Harold Jones-Quartey became the first pair of undrafted rookies to record interceptions in the same season in Bears history.

Anderson was released by the Bears on September 27, 2016, and was signed to the practice squad the next day. He was promoted back to the active roster on November 23.

On September 2, 2017, Anderson was waived by the Bears and was signed to the practice squad the next day. He was promoted to the active roster on September 12. He was waived by the Bears on October 26, 2017, and was re-signed to the practice squad. He was promoted back to the active roster on November 11, 2017. He was waived on December 9, 2017, and re-signed back to the practice squad. He was promoted back to the active roster on December 20, 2017. He played in 12 games in 2017, recording ten tackles.

On September 1, 2018, Anderson was waived by the Bears. He later landed on the team's injured reserve list, but he was waived on September 24, 2018.

=== Arizona Cardinals ===
On December 11, 2018, Anderson was signed by the Arizona Cardinals, but was released a week later.

=== New York Giants ===
On January 2, 2019, Anderson signed a reserve/future contract with the New York Giants. He was placed on injured reserve on August 31, 2019. He was released from injured reserve with an injury settlement on September 9.

== Personal life ==
In December 2014, Anderson got his degree in criminal justice.
