= Cornelius Edison =

American football player (born 1993)

No. 60
- Position: Center

Personal information
- Born: July 10, 1993 (age 33); Pomona, California, U.S.
- Listed height: 6 ft 3 in (1.91 m)
- Listed weight: 309 lb (140 kg)

Career information
- High school: Curtis Senior (University Place, Washington)
- College: Portland State
- NFL draft: 2015: undrafted

Career history
- Chicago Bears (2015–2016); Atlanta Falcons (2017)*; Minnesota Vikings (2017–2018)
- * Offseason or practice squad member only

Awards and highlights
- FCS Rimington Award (2014)

Career NFL statistics
- Games played: 6
- Stats at Pro Football Reference

Cornelius Edison (born July 10, 1993) is an American former professional football player who was a center in the National Football League (NFL). He played college football for the Portland State Vikings and was signed by the Chicago Bears as an undrafted free agent in 2015.

== Early life ==
Edison attended Curtis Senior High School in University Place, Washington. While there, as a junior, he earned First-team South Puget Sound league offensive and defensive line awards. As a senior, he was named Lineman of the Year in the South Puget Sound League South Division and was a First-team All-League selection as an offensive and defensive lineman. He was named All-State the 2010 Tacoma News Tribune All-Area lineman.

== College career ==
Edison attended Portland State University and majored in graphic design. In 2011, as a true freshman, he appeared in three games as an offensive guard. As a sophomore in 2012, he was one of four players on offense, and six on the entire Vikings roster to start every game (11) that season. As the starting left guard, blocked for an offense that averaged 438.7 yards and 34.8 points-per-game and allowed only seven sacks all season, ranking fourth in the nation. He was named All-Big Sky Conference honorable mention. In 2013 as a junior, for the second straight season, he started every game (12). For the season he was part of an offensive line that helped the offense set numerous season records, including season rushing (3,330), rushing average (277.7), total offense (6,486), total offense average (540.5) and rushing touchdowns (36). The team ranked third in the nation in rushing and total offense. The offensive line allowed just 10 sacks on 365 passes on the season. He was named Third-team All-Big Sky. As a senior in 2014, he started all 12 games again. He was named a team co-captain. He was also named First-team All-Big Sky Conference. He also competed in the FCS National Bowl All-Star game as a starting at center. He also won the 2014 Football Championship Subdivision (FCS) Rimington Award as the nations best center in the FCS.

== Professional career ==
Pre-draft measurables
Height	Weight	40-yard dash	10-yard split	20-yard split	20-yard shuttle	Three-cone drill	Vertical jump	Broad jump	Bench press
6 ft 2 1/2 in (1.89 m)	307 lb (139 kg)	5.38 s	1.92 s	3.16 s	4.92 s	7.84 s	25 in (0.64 m)	7 ft 7 in (2.31 m)	25 reps
All values from Portland State Pro day.

=== Chicago Bears ===
Prior to the 2015 NFL draft, Edison visited the New York Giants. He suffered an injury prior to the draft that sidelined him for most of the season, costing him a chance to play or be on a team's practice squad. He was signed to the Chicago Bears practice squad on November 30, 2015. On January 4, 2016, he was signed to a futures contract by the Bears.

Edison was cut by the Bears on September 4, and signed to the practice squad the next day. He was promoted to the Bears active roster on October 24. On November 8, Edison was waived by the Bears and was re-signed to the practice squad a day later. He was promoted back to the active roster on November 15, 2016. He was released again on December 20, 2016. He re-signed to the practice squad on December 21. He was then promoted back to the active roster on December 23. On December 26, he was again waived by the Bears and signed to the practice squad. He signed a reserve/future contract with the Bears on January 3, 2017. On May 11, 2017, he was waived by the Bears.

=== Atlanta Falcons ===
On May 17, 2017, Edison signed with the Atlanta Falcons. He was waived on September 2, 2017.

=== Minnesota Vikings ===
On September 4, 2017, Edison was signed to the Minnesota Vikings' practice squad. He was promoted to the active roster on October 28, 2017, but was waived two days later and re-signed back to the practice squad. He was promoted back to the active roster on December 30, 2017.

On September 1, 2018, Edison was waived by the Vikings and was signed to the practice squad the next day. He signed a reserve/future contract with the Vikings on January 2, 2019.

On August 31, 2019, Edison was released by the Vikings.

Edison was selected in the 2020 XFL draft by the Houston Roughnecks.
