= Kieren Duncan =

American gridiron football player (born 1993)

Profile
- Position: Wide receiver

Personal information
- Born: October 12, 1993 (age 33); Goodyear, Arizona, U.S.
- Listed height: 5 ft 10 in (1.78 m)
- Listed weight: 190 lb (86 kg)

Career information
- High school: Millennium (Goodyear, Arizona)
- College: CSU Pueblo
- NFL draft: 2016: undrafted

Career history
- Chicago Bears (2016)*; Winnipeg Blue Bombers (2017)*; BC Lions (2018)*; Ottawa Redblacks (2018)*
- * Offseason or practice squad member only

Kieren Duncan (born October 12, 1993) is an American former professional football wide receiver. He played college football at CSU Pueblo. He was also a member of the Chicago Bears, Winnipeg Blue Bombers, BC Lions, and Ottawa Redblacks.

== Professional career ==
Pre-draft measurables
Height	Weight	Arm length	Hand span	40-yard dash	20-yard shuttle	Three-cone drill	Vertical jump	Broad jump	Bench press
5 ft 10 1/8 in (1.78 m)	176 lb (80 kg)	28 1/8 in (0.71 m)	8 3/8 in (0.21 m)	4.37 s	4.11 s	7.06 s	37.5 in (0.95 m)	10 ft 6 in (3.20 m)	6 reps
All values from Pro Day

Duncan was signed by the Chicago Bears after going undrafted in the 2016 NFL draft. On August 28, 2016, Duncan was waived by the Bears. Duncan participated in the Winnipeg Blue Bombers 2017 training camp, but did not make the final roster. Duncan was signed by the BC Lions on February 22, 2018. He was released before the start of the regular season on May 1, 2018. He signed with the Ottawa Redblacks on May 20, and released on June 10.
