= Nate Chandler =

American football player (born 1989)

No. 78
- Position: Offensive tackle

Personal information
- Born: June 1, 1989 (age 37); San Diego, California, U.S.
- Listed height: 6 ft 4 in (1.93 m)
- Listed weight: 315 lb (143 kg)

Career information
- High school: Mira Mesa (San Diego)
- College: UCLA
- NFL draft: 2012: undrafted

Career history
- Carolina Panthers (2012–2015); Chicago Bears (2016)

Career NFL statistics
- Games played: 37
- Games started: 19
- Total tackles: 6
- Stats at Pro Football Reference

Garland Nathan Chandler Jr. (born June 1, 1989) is an American former professional football player who was an offensive tackle in the National Football League (NFL). He signed with the Carolina Panthers as an undrafted defensive tackle in 2012. He played college football for the UCLA Bruins.

== College career ==
Chandler played college football at the University of California, Los Angeles. He finished college with 38 tackles, two sacks and two pass deflections.

In his freshman year, he played the entire season as an offensive lineman. He played as a tight end in his sophomore year, which he only recorded one reception for five yards. In his junior year, he began the season as a defensive lineman. He finished the season with 21 tackles, a sack and a pass deflection.

In his senior year, Chandler finished the season with 16 tackles, a sack and a pass deflection. On September 10, 2011, In the second game of the season against San Jose State in which he had 2 tackles as the Bruins won the game 27-17. On November 5, 2011, in a game against No. 20 ranked Arizona State in which he had two tackles and a sack.

== Professional career ==
=== Carolina Panthers ===
On April 30, 2012, Chandler signed with the Carolina Panthers after going unselected in the 2012 NFL draft. On August 31, he was released for final roster cuts, but was signed to the practice squad on the following day. On October 26, he was promoted to the active roster from the practice squad.

Originally starting the 2013 season as a defensive lineman, the Panthers switched Chandler to the offensive tackle position in the week of November 8, 2013.

Chandler signed a three-year contract extension with the Panthers on June 18, 2014.

On September 17, 2015, Chandler was placed on injured reserve due to his injured knee.

On February 7, 2016, Chandler's Panthers played in Super Bowl 50. In the game, the Panthers fell to the Denver Broncos by a score of 24–10.

=== Chicago Bears ===
On June 2, 2016, Chandler was signed by the Chicago Bears. The Bears announced his retirement on July 23, 2016.
