= Nick Becton =

American football player (born 1990)

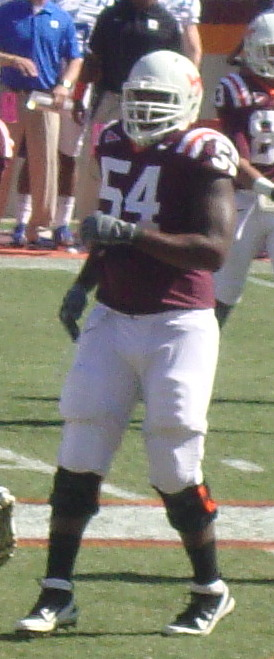
- Becton with Virginia Tech in 2012

No. 67, 68, 71, 61
- Position: Offensive tackle

Personal information
- Born: February 11, 1990 (age 36); Wilmington, North Carolina, U.S.
- Listed height: 6 ft 6 in (1.98 m)
- Listed weight: 322 lb (146 kg)

Career information
- High school: New Hanover (Wilmington)
- College: Virginia Tech
- NFL draft: 2013: undrafted

Career history
- San Diego Chargers (2013); New York Giants (2014)*; New Orleans Saints (2014); Chicago Bears (2015–2016); Detroit Lions (2017)*; Kansas City Chiefs (2017)*; New York Giants (2017)
- * Offseason or practice squad member only

Career NFL statistics
- Games played: 6
- Stats at Pro Football Reference

Nicholas Julian Becton (born February 11, 1990) is an American former professional football player who was an offensive tackle in the National Football League (NFL). He played college football for the Virginia Tech Hokies.

== Professional career ==
=== San Diego Chargers ===
On April 27, 2013, Becton signed with the San Diego Chargers as an undrafted free agent. On September 28, 2013, Becton was promoted to the Chargers' active roster. On November 16, 2013, Becton was released by the Chargers, but signed to the practice squad on November 18, 2013. The Chargers released Becton on August 25, 2014.

=== New York Giants ===
He was signed to the New York Giants practice squad a few days after his release from the Bears.

=== New Orleans Saints ===
On November 4, 2014, the New Orleans Saints signed Becton to their active roster. He was waived on September 5, 2015.

=== Chicago Bears ===
Becton was signed to the Chicago Bears' practice squad on September 7, 2015.

On March 9, 2016, Becton signed a one-year deal with the Chicago Bears. He was released by Chicago when the Bears signed Mike Adams on August 10, 2016. He was later placed on injured reserve.

=== Detroit Lions ===
On July 31, 2017, Becton signed with the Detroit Lions. He was waived on September 2, 2017.

=== Kansas City Chiefs ===
On October 23, 2017, Becton was signed to the Kansas City Chiefs' practice squad. He was released on November 9, 2017.

=== New York Giants (second stint) ===
On November 14, 2017, Becton was signed to the New York Giants' practice squad. He was promoted to the active roster on December 30, 2017.

On September 1, 2018, Becton was released by the Giants.
