= Ben LeCompte =

American football player (born 1993)

Personal information
- Born: February 1, 1993 (age 33); Barrington, Illinois, U.S.
- Listed height: 5 ft 10 in (1.78 m)
- Listed weight: 200 lb (91 kg)

Career information
- High school: Barrington (IL)
- College: North Dakota State
- NFL draft: 2016: undrafted

Career history
- Chicago Bears (2016)*
- * Offseason or practice squad member only

Awards and highlights
- 5× FCS national champion (2011–2015); 2015 STATS All-America First-team; 2015 FCS ADA All-America First-team; 2015 AP All-America Second-team; 2014 Sports Network All-America Second-team; 2014, 2015 All-MVFC First-team; 2013 All-MVFC Second-team; 2012 MVFC All-Newcomer Team; 2012 College Sports Journal FCS All-Freshman Team

Ben LeCompte (born February 1, 1993) is an American former football punter. He played college football at North Dakota State University. He participated in The Spring League (TSL) in 2017.
