= 2017 Chicago Bears season =

98th season in franchise history

- Owner: The McCaskey Family
- General manager: Ryan Pace
- Head coach: John Fox
- Home stadium: Soldier Field

Results
- Record: 5–11
- Division place: 4th NFC North
- Playoffs: Did not qualify
- Pro Bowlers: None

Uniform
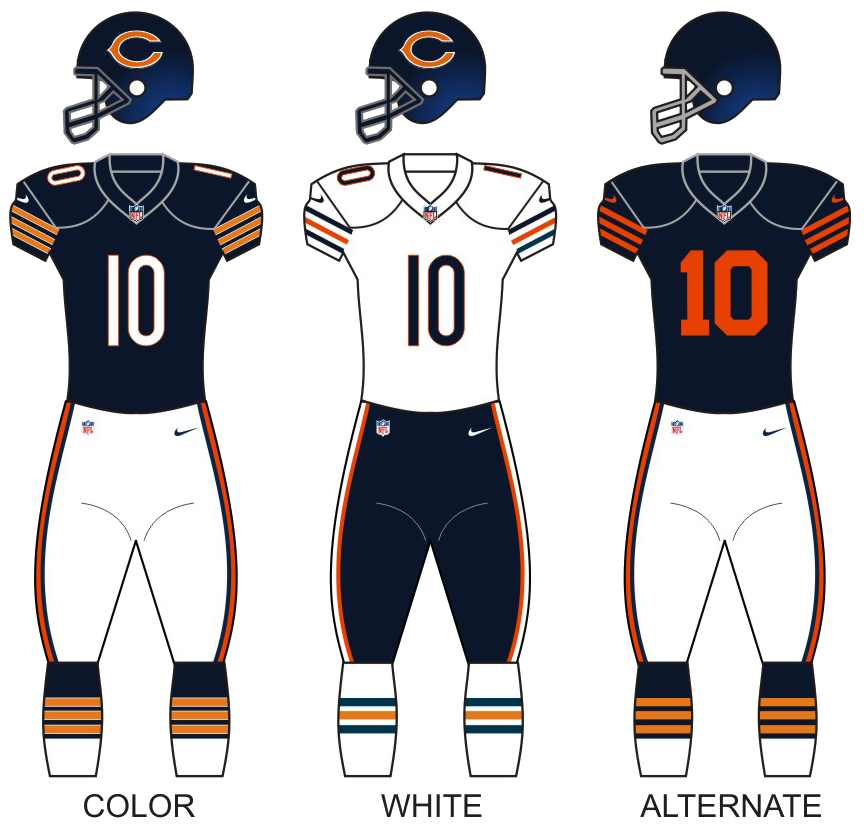

The 2017 season was the Chicago Bears' 98th in the National Football League (NFL), as well as their third and final season under head coach John Fox. The Bears improved upon the previous year's 3–13 record, finishing 5–11, but failed to make the playoffs for the seventh consecutive season and suffered their fourth consecutive losing season.

This was their first season since 2008 without Jay Cutler as their starting quarterback, ending an eight-year era. Instead, the Bears picked up former Tampa Bay Buccaneers' quarterback Mike Glennon in free agency and traded up to the number two overall pick in the draft for Mitchell Trubisky. Glennon started the first four games of the season, but was benched for Trubisky after a 1–3 start. Despite entering the bye week with a 3–5 record, the Bears were eliminated from playoff contention following a week thirteen loss against the San Francisco 49ers, and finished the season 5–11. In addition, no Bears players were selected to the Pro Bowl. To add to these failures, it was the first season since 1969 that the Bears failed to win a game against a divisional opponent.

On January 1, 2018, after failing to produce a winning season for a third consecutive season, Fox was fired following the Bears' 23–10 loss to the Minnesota Vikings the day prior.

== Offseason ==
=== Organizational changes ===
On January 3, running backs coach Stan Drayton departed the team to become the running backs coach for the Texas Longhorns. The following day, the Bears fired offensive line coach Dave Magazu and assistant defensive backs coach Sam Garnes. The Bears lost a fourth assistant coach on January 7, when outside linebackers coach Clint Hurtt joined the New York Jets. To take their places, the Bears hired San Francisco 49ers offensive coordinator Curtis Modkins, Miami Dolphins assistant offensive line coach Jeremiah Washburn and 49ers safeties coach Roy Anderson, respectively. In addition to his role as Bears defensive coordinator, Vic Fangio assumed Hurtt's role as outside linebackers coach until Chattanooga Mocs defensive coordinator Brandon Staley was hired on February 22. Assistant offensive line coach Kevin Mawae was not retained by the Bears. On January 30, wide receivers coach Curtis Johnson announced he would be leaving the team. Tennessee Volunteers receivers coach / passing game coordinator Zach Azzanni was hired to replace Johnson on February 22. The Bears and 49ers also swapped special teams coaches when the latter's ST coordinator Derius Swinton II, who served as an assistant for the Bears in 2015, returned to Chicago as the assistant ST coach; meanwhile, Bears assistant ST coach Richard Hightower joined the 49ers as their new ST coordinator.

=== Roster changes ===
Position	Player	Free agency Tag	Date signed	2017 team
OLB	Sam Acho	UFA	April 15	Chicago Bears
LT	Mike Adams	UFA		
CB	Johnthan Banks	UFA	March 11	Chicago Bears
QB	Matt Barkley	UFA	March 10	San Francisco 49ers
K	Connor Barth	UFA	March 10	Chicago Bears
LT	Nick Becton	UFA	July 31	Detroit Lions
QB	Brian Hoyer	UFA	March 9	San Francisco 49ers
WR	Alshon Jeffery	UFA	March 9	Philadelphia Eagles
G	Eric Kush	UFA	February 15	Chicago Bears
G	Ted Larsen	UFA	March 9	Miami Dolphins
RT	Matt McCants	UFA	March 27	Cleveland Browns
TE	Logan Paulsen	UFA	March 9	San Francisco 49ers
SS	Chris Prosinski	UFA	March 20	Chicago Bears
WR	Deonte Thompson	UFA	March 23	Chicago Bears
DE	Cornelius Washington	UFA	March 9	Detroit Lions
DE	C. J. Wilson	UFA	March 20	Chicago Bears
WR	Marquess Wilson	UFA	June 20	New York Jets
WR	Josh Bellamy	RFA	March 6	Chicago Bears
QB	David Fales	RFA	April 5	Miami Dolphins
SS	Demontre Hurst	RFA	April 3	Tennessee Titans
OLB	Christian Jones	RFA	March 11	Chicago Bears
QB	Connor Shaw	RFA	March 4	Chicago Bears
RB	Bralon Addison	ERFA		
TE	Daniel Brown	ERFA	March 6	Chicago Bears
CB	Bryce Callahan	ERFA	March 6	Chicago Bears
ILB	Danny Mason	ERFA	July 29	Denver Broncos
LS	Patrick Scales	ERFA	March 4	Chicago Bears
RFA: Restricted free agent, UFA: Unrestricted free agent, ERFA: Exclusive rights free agent

==== Acquisitions ====
The first transactions of the year occurred shortly after the conclusion of the 2016 regular season, on January 3, 2017, when the Bears signed to futures contracts cornerbacks De'Vante Bausby, Jacoby Glenn and Rashaad Reynolds, wide receiver Dres Anderson, running back David Cobb, tackle William Poehls, guard Cyril Richardson and center Cornelius Edison. Bausby, Glenn and Edison all saw regular season action for the Bears in 2016, with Glenn also earning three starts throughout the season, while Anderson, Cobb, Poehls, Reynolds and Richardson spent the 2016 season on the team's practice squad.

On January 6, the team signed to a futures contract defensive end Kapron Lewis-Moore. Lewis-Moore, a 2013 sixth-round pick by the Baltimore Ravens, was a practice squad player in Baltimore during the 2016 season after playing in five games (three tackles) in 2015. Four days later, the Bears signed to a futures contract with wide receiver Rueben Randle. Randle, a former second-round pick by the New York Giants in 2012, spent the 2016 season out of football after being released by the Philadelphia Eagles at the end of the preseason.

On March 10, the Bears signed quarterback Mike Glennon, wide receiver Markus Wheaton, tight end Dion Sims and safety Quintin Demps. Glennon, who started 18 games for the Tampa Bay Buccaneers between 2013 and 2014, signed a three-year, $43.5 million deal with the Bears and started the first four games of the season. Wheaton, a former third-round pick by the Pittsburgh Steelers in 2013, missed most of the 2016 season with a shoulder injury, after recording 44 receptions for 749 yards and five touchdowns in 2015. Sims, an excellent blocker who started 11 games for the Miami Dolphins in 2016, signed a three-year, $18 million contract with the team. Demps, a nine-year veteran who led the Houston Texans in interceptions in 2016, signed a three-year, $13.5 million contract with the Bears.

On March 11, the team added cornerbacks Prince Amukamara and Marcus Cooper, offensive lineman Tom Compton and wide receiver Kendall Wright. Amukamara, a former first-round draft pick of the 2011 Giants, who started twelve games for the Jacksonville Jaguars in 2016, agreed to a one-year, $7 million contract, while Cooper, a 7th round pick by the San Francisco 49ers in 2013 who led the Arizona Cardinals in interceptions during the 2016 season, signed a three-year, $16 million contract with the team. Cooper played wide receiver at Rutgers. Compton, a five-year veteran who played in all 16 regular season games for the 2016 NFC champion Atlanta Falcons, was a 6th round pick by the Redskins in 2012. Wright, a former first-round pick by the Tennessee Titans who played under Bears offensive coordinator Dowell Loggains and caught 280 passes for 2,244 yards and 18 touchdowns through his five seasons with the team, both agreed to one-year deals with the Bears.

On March 17, the Bears signed defensive tackle John Jenkins, a 359-pound nose tackle who was a third-round pick by the New Orleans Saints in 2013, when Bears general manager Ryan Pace was the Saints' Director of player personnel. Jenkins agreed to a one-year, $900.000 contract with the team. Los Angeles Rams running back Benny Cunningham signed with the team on March 21; also a kick returner, he returned 22 kicks for an average of 27.2 yards, fourth-best in the NFL. Three days later, the Bears signed veteran quarterback Mark Sanchez to a one-year contract. On April 5, cornerback B. W. Webb was signed on a one-year deal; Webb started eight games for the Saints in 2016 and recorded an interception.

The first signing of May took place on May 1, signing interior offensive lineman and former Bear Taylor Boggs; after spending 2013 and 2014 with the Bears, Boggs played for the Cardinals in 2016. The next day, the Bears signed another offensive lineman in Bradley Sowell, who played left and right tackle for the Seattle Seahawks in 2016. On May 4, Kansas City Chiefs defensive end Jaye Howard signed with the Bears on a one-year contract; starting four games in 2016 with the Chiefs, Howard had 122 tackles and 7.5 sacks over his five-year career. Four days later, linebacker Dan Skuta, a former player of Vic Fangio during their time with the 49ers, joined the Bears on a one-year deal. On May 25, the Bears signed Giants' Victor Cruz to a one-year contract; Cruz caught 39 passes for 586 yards and a touchdown in 2016 after two seasons plagued with injuries. On the final day of the month, Detroit Lions fullback Michael Burton was claimed off waivers by the Bears; in 2015, Burton caught six passes for 39 yards and a touchdown, along with four rushing attempts for two yards, while he did not record a rush or a reception in 2016.

==== Departures ====
On January 9, linebacker Josh Shirley was waived. Shirley, who was signed to the Bears' practice squad on December 14 and promoted to the active roster for the season finale, played only one defensive snap for the team in 2016. On March 9, the team released longtime quarterback Jay Cutler; the 33-year-old quarterback held multiple franchise passing records, but played just five games in 2016 due to injury. Later in the month, on March 31, the Bears waived defensive end Ego Ferguson, who last played during the 2015 season and was since on injured reserve twice. Cornerback Tracy Porter was released on April 10; despite starting all sixteen games in 2016, he struggled with knee injuries throughout the year. In early May, the Bears released six players: running backs David Cobb and Bralon Addison, defensive backs De'Vante Bausby and Jacoby Glenn; wide receiver Dres Anderson and tight end Justin Perillo. On May 11, receiver Eddie Royal, defensive lineman Will Sutton, fullback Paul Lasike and center Cornelius Edison were waived; Royal struggled with injuries during his tenure with the Bears; Sutton, a 4–3 defensive tackle, did not fit Fangio's 3–4 defense and was unable to record a sack as a Bear.

On March 9, free agency began with the departure of receiver Alshon Jeffery for the Eagles to end a five-year tenure in Chicago. Quarterbacks Brian Hoyer and Matt Barkley, along with tight end Logan Paulsen, signed with the San Francisco 49ers. Three other linemen who left the Bears included defensive end Cornelius Washington, who joined the Lions, guard Ted Larsen, who signed with the Miami Dolphins, and offensive tackle Matt McCants, who was signed by the Cleveland Browns. On April 3, cornerback Demontre Hurst became a Titan. Two days later, quarterback David Fales also signed with the Dolphins. On July 29 and 31, linebacker Danny Mason and offensive lineman Nick Becton signed with the Broncos and Lions, respectively.

=== 2017 NFL draft ===
==== Pre-draft ====
Entering the draft, the Bears saw needs at various positions, including quarterback, offensive tackle, wide receiver, and safety. In the months leading up to April's draft, the team interacted with 84 players; 21 had private visits, 7 players visited during the NFL Scouting Combine, 55 met during the Senior Bowl and 2 during the East–West Shrine Game, 4 had private workouts, while 2 had local visits. Of the 84, 6 had met with the team on multiple occasions.

With the third-overall pick leading up to the draft, it was the highest selection by the Bears since the 2005 NFL draft, in which the team drafted Texas Longhorns running back Cedric Benson; it was also the first No. 3 pick since 1972, which was used on Southern Illinois Salukis offensive tackle Lionel Antoine.

==== Draft ====
The Bears traded the third-overall pick, a 2017 third-round pick (No. 67) overall, a 2017 fourth-round pick (No. 111) and a 2018 third-round pick to the 49ers in exchange for their second-overall pick. Moving up a spot in the draft order, the Bears used it on North Carolina quarterback Mitchell Trubisky; although he only started for one full season, Trubisky threw for 30 touchdowns and just six interceptions in 2016, including completing 68 percent of his passes and an average of 8.4 yards per pass. In the second round, the Bears traded the 36th-overall pick and a seventh-round selection (No. 211) to the Cardinals in exchange for their 45th-overall pick, a fourth- (No. 119) and sixth-rounder (No. 197), and a fourth-rounder in 2018. With the new second-round pick, tight end Adam Shaheen of the Ashland Eagles was selected; in 2016, Shaheen recorded 16 touchdown receptions, the most in a season by a tight end in NCAA Division II history. After trading their third-rounder to the 49ers, the Bears did not have a pick in that round, instead waiting until the next round to use the 112th-overall pick on Alabama safety Eddie Jackson; over the course of his college career, Jackson had nine interceptions, 12 pass breakups and five touchdowns (three on interception returns), including restricting opposing quarterbacks to a combined 38.3 passer rating when throwing his way in 2016. Also a punt returner, he averaged 23 yards on punt returns, but broke his leg on a return during a game last October. The second fourth-round pick, the 119th-overall from Arizona, was used to select North Carolina A&T running back Tarik Cohen. The 5 ft 6 in (1.68 m), 160 lb (73 kg) running back attracted Internet attention in 2015 when a video surfaced of him performing a backflip and catching two footballs at the same time. With the Aggies, Cohen was named Mid-Eastern Athletic Conference Rookie of the Year during his freshman year and was the MEAC Offensive Player of the Year three times as he recorded 5,619 rushing yards during his tenure. A second Division II player, Kutztown Golden Bears offensive lineman Jordan Morgan, was drafted with Chicago's final pick (a fifth-rounder and the 147th-overall selection); the first Kutztown player to be drafted since Andre Reed in 1985, Morgan started 43 of 44 games with the Golden Bears, winning the 2016 Gene Upshaw Award and being named the Pennsylvania State Athletic Conference Eastern Division Offensive Athlete of the Year, the first lineman to receive the honor.

Reception to the Bears' draft varied. The decision to trade up for the second-overall pick was criticized by various analysts: CBSSports.com writer Pete Prisco called it a "strange move to give up so much to move up a spot", while Fox Sports 1 pundits Skip Bayless and Shannon Sharpe as "indefensibly idiotic" and as making "no sense", the latter also questioning the necessity of drafting a quarterback so early after signing Mike Glennon in free agency. The Bears drafted three players from colleges not within the Division I Football Bowl Subdivision, the first time the team's draft class featured three non-FBS players since 2002, when the Bears drafted Delaware receiver Jamin Elliott (FCS), Georgia Southern running back Adrian Peterson (FCS) and Tuskegee cornerback Roosevelt Williams (Division II).

2017 Chicago Bears draft
Round	Pick	Player	Position	College	Notes
1	2	Mitchell Trubisky *	QB	North Carolina	From San Francisco
2	45	Adam Shaheen	TE	Ashland	From Arizona
4	112	Eddie Jackson *	S	Alabama	
4	119	Tarik Cohen *	RB	North Carolina A&T	From Arizona
5	147	Jordan Morgan	G	Kutztown	
Made roster † Pro Football Hall of Fame * Made at least one Pro Bowl during career

Notes

- The Bears acquired an additional fourth-round selection (No. 117 overall) as part of a trade that sent the team's 2016 second-round selection to the Buffalo Bills.
- The Bears traded their sixth-round selection (No. 188 overall) to the Houston Texans in exchange for tight end Khari Lee.
- The Bears traded their third-overall pick, third-round pick, a fourth-round pick and a 2018 third-round pick to the 49ers for the second-overall pick.
- The Bears traded their second- and seventh-round selections (36th and 221st) to Arizona in exchange for Arizona's second-, fourth-, and sixth-round selections (45th, 119th, and 197th) as well as a fourth-round selection in 2018.

==== Undrafted free agents ====
After the draft, the Bears signed the following undrafted free agents:

Position	Player	College
RB	Joel Bouagnon	Northern Illinois
DL	Rashaad Coward	Old Dominion
LB	Hendrick Ekpe	Minnesota
WR	Tanner Gentry	Wyoming
TE	Franko House	Ball State
LB	Isaiah Irving	San Jose State
OT	Dieugot Joseph	Florida International
OL	Mitchell Kirsch	James Madison
K	Andy Phillips	Utah
LB	Alex Scearce	Coastal Carolina
WR	Jhajuan Seales	Oklahoma State
FB	Freddie Stevenson	Florida State
WR	Kermit Whitfield	Florida State

=== Offseason activities ===
The first day of offseason workouts was on April 18. Other events included offseason team activities (OTAs) on May 23–25 and 30–31, and June 1 and 5–8. A mandatory minicamp took place from June 13–15. Two weeks after the draft, the Bears hosted their Rookie Minicamp from May 12–14. In addition to the draft picks and 13 undrafted free agents signed prior, the Minicamp featured 38 rookies and nine veteran players trying out. At the end of the camp, the Bears signed veteran tryout and former New York Jets receiver Titus Davis, who retired after the 2016 season before participating at the camp. In conjunction with the signing, Kermit Whitfield was waived. On May 30, the Bears waived quarterback Connor Shaw, but following an injury to Mark Sanchez, rescinded the waiver and instead released Jhujuan Seales. When Michael Burton was signed a day later, Franko House was released.

Bears Training Camp was held at Olivet Nazarene University in Bourbonnais from July 26 to August 14. The team's annual Family Fest was held at Soldier Field on August 5, while a practice was conducted at Prospect High School on August 17. On August 3, Joel Bouagnon was waived with an injury designation, with Tulane Green Wave running back Joshua Rounds being signed in his place. A day later, during a practice, guard Eric Kush tore a hamstring from its bone, forcing the Bears to place him on the injured reserve list and rendering him out for the 2017 season. To replace Kush, Chicago signed Alabama tight end Brandon Greene, who also played offensive lineman and was a run blocker for the Crimson Tide. At Family Fest, Andy Phillips struggled and was released two days later, with his roster slot being filled by Tennessee Volunteers receiver Alton Howard.

== Preseason ==
=== Transactions ===
Preseason roster changes

Additions

- On August 13, the Bears signed Roberto Aguayo.
- On August 18, the Bears signed Kelvin Sheppard.
- On August 28, the Bears signed Jeff Overbaugh.
- On September 3, the Bears acquired Andrew DePaola, Tre McBride, and Taquan Mizzell off waivers.
- On September 4, the Bears signed John Jenkins.

Departures

- On August 18, the Bears released Hendrick Ekpe.
- On August 29, the Bears released Kapron Lewis-Moore and Alex Scearce.
- On September 2, the Bears released Roberto Aguayo, Jonathan Anderson, Daniel Braverman, Rashaad Coward, Titus Davis, Tanner Gentry, Brandon Greene, DeAndre Houston-Carson, Alton Howard, Isaiah Irving, Harold Jones-Quartey, Dieugot Joseph, Mitchell Kirsch, William Poehls, MyCole Pruitt, Rashaad Reynolds, Cyril Richardson, Joshua Rounds, Freddie Stevenson, John Timu, Johnthan Banks, Taylor Boggs, Victor Cruz, Jaye Howard, John Jenkins, Kelvin Sheppard, Dan Skuta, B. W. Webb, and C. J. Wilson.
- On September 3, the Bears released Ben Braunecker, Jeremy Langford, and Jeff Overbaugh.

Reserve lists

- On August 13, the Bears placed Rueben Randle on the injured reserve list.
- On August 28, the Bears placed Patrick Scales on the injured reserve list.
- On September 2, the Bears placed Connor Shaw, Ka'Deem Carey, Lamarr Houston, Cameron Meredith, Jordan Morgan, and Chris Prosinski on the injured reserve list.
- On September 4, the Bears placed Deiondre' Hall on the injured reserve list.

Practice squad additions

- On September 4, the Bears added Jonathan Anderson, Rashaad Coward, Tanner Gentry, Brandon Greene, DeAndre Houston-Carson, Isaiah Irving, Dieugot Joseph, Cameron Lee, and John Timu to the practice squad.

=== Schedule ===
The Bears' preseason schedule was announced on April 10. Like in 2016, the first game of the preseason was at home against the Broncos, who defeated the Bears 22–0 in last year's meeting. For the next two games, the Bears traveled to Arizona and Tennessee to take on the Cardinals and Titans before ending August in Soldier Field against a traditional preseason opponent in the Cleveland Browns; playing each other to close the preseason since 2004, the Bears held a 7–6 lead in the series.

Week	Date	Opponent	Result	Record	Game site	NFL.com GameBook	NFL.com recap
1	August 10	Denver Broncos	L 17–24	0–1	Soldier Field	GameBook	Recap
2	August 19	at Arizona Cardinals	W 24–23	1–1	University of Phoenix Stadium	GameBook	Recap
3	August 27	at Tennessee Titans	W 19–7	2–1	Nissan Stadium	GameBook	Recap
4	August 31	Cleveland Browns	L 0–25	2–2	Soldier Field	GameBook	Recap

=== Game summaries ===
Against the Broncos, the Bears' preseason started on a rough note; on the third play of the game, Mike Glennon's pass for Zach Miller was intercepted by Chris Harris Jr. and returned 50 yards for a touchdown. On the resulting kickoff, Deonte Thompson muffed the return, but managed to recover and return it to the Bears' 28-yard line, though Ka'Deem Carey was injured on the play. The Bears were later forced to punt on the drive. Now on defense, Chicago started strong when Leonard Floyd sacked Trevor Siemian on the first play of the series, but the defense committed four consecutive penalties and Denver was able to add three points to the score with Brandon McManus' 38-yard field goal. Another turnover for the Bears offense occurred when Cody Whitehair's snap missed Glennon and was recovered by Jamal Carter of the Broncos. Both teams traded punts and Mark Sanchez eventually replaced Glennon at quarterback; Glennon struggled greatly, completing just two of eight passes for 20 yards with an interception and a 0.0 passer rating. Sanchez would play one series, completing a pass for four yards. With 1:55 remaining in the first half, Mitchell Trubisky became the Bears' quarterback, where he led the offense by completing all four of his passes for 24 yards on a six-play, 50-yard drive, culminating in a two-yard touchdown pass to Victor Cruz. After the Broncos punted to start the second half, Trubisky guided the Bears on a 75-yard series, which ended with Benny Cunningham's one-yard touchdown run to take the 14–10 lead. On Chicago's next possession, the offense traveled 45 yards before Connor Barth kicked a 25-yard field goal. Despite the seven-point advantage, the Broncos scored 14 unanswered points on Kyle Sloter's 47-yard touchdown pass to Isaiah McKenzie and DeAngelo Henderson's 41-yard run on third down-and-22 with less than two minutes in the game. Down 24–17, Trubisky attempted to rally a late drive and reached the Broncos' 22-yard line, but his final pass to Thompson fell incomplete as time expired. In total, Trubisky completed his first ten passes and ended the day with 18/25 passes completed for 166 yards with a touchdown and a 103.1 rating.

At University of Phoenix Stadium, Chicago scored first on Barth's 42-yard field goal in the opening quarter. A quarter later, the Bears had another opportunity to score again, but Glennon's pass for Kendall Wright was intercepted by Tyrann Mathieu at the Cardinals' 11-yard line and was taken 52 yards to the Bears' 43. During the resulting drive, J. J. Nelson was stripped by Quintin Demps and recovered by the Bears' Cre'Von LeBlanc, who returned the fumble 77 yards for the score, though it was overturned upon official review and Arizona retained possession of the ball. The Cardinals reached the Bears' one-yard line, but failed to score on first, second and third down before Carson Palmer threw a touchdown pass to Jermaine Gresham on fourth down. Glennon rebounded by throwing a seven-yard touchdown pass to Wright despite facing a heavy blitz. On the final play of the first half, Cardinals kicker Phil Dawson attempted a 63-yard field goal, which fell short and was caught by Deonte Thompson, who returned it 109 yards for the touchdown. During Arizona's first drive of the second half, Blaine Gabbert scored on a four-yard touchdown run. Sanchez entered the game for the Bears on the next series, though he fumbled on a snap and the Bears eventually punted. Trubisky took over a drive later, where he led the Bears offense into field goal range, though Roberto Aguayo missed a 49-yard field goal. In the fourth quarter, Chicago's Roy Robertson-Harris recorded two consecutive sacks, while B. W. Webb intercepted a Gabbert pass by pulling the ball from Chris Hubert; though the play initially resulted in a touchdown, it was overturned, though the Bears kept the ball. Trubisky eventually threw a six-yard touchdown pas to Cunningham to make the score 24–14, but the Cardinals scored on Dawson's 52-yard field goal and Gabbert's three-yard pass to Jeremy Ross to draw them within one point. Arizona attempted a two-point conversion, but Gabbert's pass for Ross fell incomplete to seal the win.

In Nashville, the Titans punted on the opening drive, with Brett Kern's punt landing at the Bears' four-yard line. Glennon successfully engineered a 15-play, 96-yard drive as he completed seven of nine passes for 89 yards and culminating with a one-yard touchdown pass to Dion Sims. On their next drive, the Titans were forced to punt again, with Kern once again forcing the Bears to start deep within their own territory with a 61-yard punt landing at the six. Unlike the first drive, Chicago was unable to score on the second and was forced to punt, though the offense entered Tennessee's side of the field. During Kern's third punt, Robertson-Harris blocked it in the end zone and Adam Shaheen attempted to recover, but was ruled out of bounds, giving the Bears two points via safety. The Titans' Ryan Succop later tried a 40-yard field goal, but missed it to the right; the Bears' Barth responded by converting his 41-yard field goal to give his team a 12–0 lead at halftime. Trubisky entered the game in the third quarter, though neither team scored during the quarter. On the first play of the fourth quarter, Tennessee's Marcus Mariota threw a three-yard touchdown pass to Derrick Henry to decrease the margin to five points, though the Bears retaliated as Trubisky launched a 45-yard pass to Tanner Gentry for the score. Two series later, Titans quarterback Matt Cassel was strip-sacked by Lamarr Houston, with Chicago's John Jenkins recovering; Connor Shaw eventually took over the Bears' quarterback role, though his drive also ended with a fumble when Freddie Stevenson lost the ball after being tackles by Justin Staples, with Daren Bates recovering. With 1:46 Alex Tanney guided the Titans offense into Chicago territory before failing to convert on fourth down. Shaw kneeled once to end the game with a 19–7 win. Despite the win, the Bears roster suffered a variety of injuries: Prince Amukamura had an ankle injury early in the game, receiver Cameron Meredith suffered a left anterior cruciate ligament injury that required replacement and ruled him out until 2018, long snapper Patrick Scales injured his right knee and was placed on the waived/injured list, and linebackers Floyd and Dan Skuta had a foot injury and underwent concussion protocol, respectively.

Trubisky was named the starter for the final preseason game against the Browns, the Bears hoping doing so would give the rookie game experience. He started the game by handing off on nine consecutive plays, with three straight drives ending with punts. By the end of the game, he attempted only four passes, completing two for ten yards. The game was scoreless until late in the first half, when Cleveland's Cody Kessler threw a 27-yard touchdown pass to Rannell Hall. In the second half, the Browns scored 18 unanswered points: Zane Gonzalez kicked a 53-yard field goal, Calvin Pryor and Karter Schult sacked Shaw in the end zone for a safety, and Kevin Hogan threw 51- and 21-yard touchdown passes to Randall Telfer and Jordan Leslie, respectively. Trubisky returned to the game in the fourth quarter on two occasions when Shaw was hurt, though he could not lead the Bears on a scoring drive and was sacked at the Browns' nine-yard line on the final play of the game.

== Regular season ==
=== Transactions ===
Regular season roster changes

Additions

- On September 12, the Bears promoted Jonathan Anderson and Tanner Gentry to the active roster.
- On September 19, the Bears promoted DeAndre Houston-Carson to the active roster.
- On September 23, the Bears promoted John Timu to the active roster.
- On October 2, the Bears promoted Tre McBride to the active roster.
- On October 9, the Bears promoted Isaiah Irving to the active roster.
- On October 11, the Bears promoted Tanner Gentry to the active roster.
- On October 26, the Bears acquired Dontrelle Inman in a trade with the Los Angeles Chargers.
- On November 9, the Bears promoted Ben Braunecker to the active roster.
- On November 11, the Bears promoted Jonathan Anderson to the active roster.
- On November 20, the Bears signed Cairo Santos.
- On November 23, the Bears promoted Howard Jones to the active roster.
- On November 29, the Bears signed Lamarr Houston.
- On December 2, the Bears promoted Deiondre' Hall to the active roster.
- On December 4, the Bears signed Mike Nugent.
- On December 5, the Bears promoted Howard Jones and Cameron Lee to the active roster.
- On December 9, the Bears promoted Rashaad Coward to the active roster.

Departures

- On September 19, the Bears released Tanner Gentry.
- On September 23, the Bears released Tre McBride.
- On October 11, the Bears released Deonte Thompson.
- On October 26, the Bears released Jonathan Anderson.
- On November 11, the Bears released Tanner Gentry.
- On November 20, the Bears released Connor Barth.
- On November 27, the Bears released Mario Alford.
- On November 28, the Bears released Tre McBride.
- On November 30, the Bears released Howard Jones.
- On December 9, the Bears released Jonathan Anderson.

Reserve lists

- On September 12, the Bears placed Kevin White and Jerrell Freeman on the injured reserve list.
- On September 29, the Bears placed Quintin Demps on the injured reserve list.
- On October 10, the Bears placed Willie Young on the injured reserve list.
- On November 9, the Bears placed Zach Miller on the injured reserve list.
- On November 23, the Bears placed Leonard Floyd on the injured reserve list.
- On December 2, the Bears placed Isaiah Irving on the injured reserve list.
- On December 4, the Bears placed Cairo Santos on the injured reserve list.
- On December 5, the Bears placed Kyle Long and Mitch Unrein on the injured reserve list.

Practice squad additions

- On September 12, the Bears added Joshua Rounds and Mario Alford to the practice squad.
- On September 19, the Bears added Mike Purcell to the practice squad.
- On September 21, the Bears added Tanner Gentry to the practice squad.
- On September 26, the Bears added Tre McBride and Doran Grant to the practice squad.
- On October 2, the Bears added Jason Thompson to the practice squad.
- On October 6, the Bears added Howard Jones to the practice squad.
- On October 11, the Bears added Carl Bradford and Darreus Rogers to the practice squad.
- On October 16, the Bears added Nelson Spruce to the practice squad.
- On November 7, the Bears added Colin Thompson to the practice squad.
- On November 14, the Bears added Tanner Gentry and Travis Averill to the practice squad.
- On December 2, the Bears added Howard Jones to the practice squad.
- On December 5, the Bears added Colin Thompson and Will Pericak to the practice squad.

Practice squad departures

- On September 19, the Bears removed Joshua Rounds from the practice squad.
- On October 6, the Bears removed Mike Purcell from the practice squad.
- On October 16, the Bears removed Jason Thompson from the practice squad.
- On November 14, the Bears removed Darreus Rogers from the practice squad.
- On December 2, the Bears removed Colin Thompson from the practice squad.

=== Schedule ===
Week	Date	Opponent	Result	Record	Game site	NFL.com GameBook	NFL.com recap
1	September 10	Atlanta Falcons	**L** 17–23	0–1	Soldier Field	GameBook	Recap
2	September 17	at Tampa Bay Buccaneers	**L** 7–29	0–2	Raymond James Stadium	GameBook	Recap
3	September 24	Pittsburgh Steelers	**W** 23–17 (OT)	1–2	Soldier Field	GameBook	Recap
4	September 28	at **Green Bay Packers**	**L** 14–35	1–3	Lambeau Field	GameBook	Recap
5	October 9	**Minnesota Vikings**	**L** 17–20	1–4	Soldier Field	GameBook	Recap
6	October 15	at Baltimore Ravens	**W** 27–24 (OT)	2–4	M&T Bank Stadium	GameBook	Recap
7	October 22	Carolina Panthers	**W** 17–3	3–4	Soldier Field	GameBook	Recap
8	October 29	at New Orleans Saints	**L** 12–20	3–5	Mercedes-Benz Superdome	GameBook	Recap
9	Bye						
10	November 12	**Green Bay Packers**	**L** 16–23	3–6	Soldier Field	GameBook	Recap
11	November 19	**Detroit Lions**	**L** 24–27	3–7	Soldier Field	GameBook	Recap
12	November 26	at Philadelphia Eagles	**L** 3–31	3–8	Lincoln Financial Field	GameBook	Recap
13	December 3	San Francisco 49ers	**L** 14–15	3–9	Soldier Field	GameBook	Recap
14	December 10	at Cincinnati Bengals	**W** 33–7	4–9	Paul Brown Stadium	GameBook	Recap
15	December 16	at **Detroit Lions**	**L** 10–20	4–10	Ford Field	GameBook	Recap
16	December 24	Cleveland Browns	**W** 20–3	5–10	Soldier Field	GameBook	Recap
17	December 31	at **Minnesota Vikings**	**L** 10–23	5–11	U.S. Bank Stadium	GameBook	Recap
Note: Intra-division opponents are in **bold** text. Legend # Games played with color uniforms. # Games played with white uniforms. # Games played with 1940s throwback uniforms. – Light green background indicates a victory. – Light red background indicates a loss. Note: The Bears' Color Rush uniforms for the Week 4 Thursday Night game at the Green Bay Packers consisted of navy blue pants with their standard navy jerseys.

=== Game summaries ===
==== Week 1: vs. Atlanta Falcons ====
Week One: Atlanta Falcons at Chicago Bears – Game summary

Quarter	1	2	3	4	Total
**Falcons**	3	7	3	10	**23**
Bears	0	10	0	7	**17**

at Soldier Field, Chicago, Illinois

- Date: September 10
- Game time: 12:00 p.m. CDT
- Game weather: 64 °F (18 °C), sunny
- Game attendance: 61,857
- Referee: Jeff Triplette
- TV announcers (Fox): Kevin Burkhardt, Charles Davis and Pam Oliver
- Recap, Gamebook

Game information

**First quarter**

- ATL – Matt Bryant 48-yard field goal, 8:01. Falcons 3–0. **Drive: 11 plays, 62 yards, 7:04.**

**Second quarter**

- CHI – Connor Barth 54-yard field goal, 15:00. Tied 3–3. **Drive: 10 plays, 41 yards, 4:24.**
- ATL – Devonta Freeman 5-yard run (Matt Bryant kick), 4:34. Falcons 10–3. **Drive: 11 plays, 83 yards, 6:59.**
- CHI – Jordan Howard 4-yard run (Connor Barth kick), 0:20. Tied 10–10. **Drive: 7 plays, 75 yards, 4:15.**

**Third quarter**

- ATL – Matt Bryant 28-yard field goal, 2:15. Falcons 13–10. **Drive: 13 plays, 76 yards, 6:29.**

**Fourth quarter**

- ATL – Austin Hooper 88-yard pass from Matt Ryan (Matt Bryant kick), 12:10. Falcons 20–10. **Drive: 3 plays, 95 yards, 0:59.**
- CHI – Tarik Cohen 19-yard pass from Mike Glennon (Connor Barth kick), 7:33. Falcons 20–17. **Drive: 9 plays, 75 yards, 4:29.**
- ATL – Matt Bryant 37-yard field goal, 3:29. Falcons 23–17. **Drive: 9 plays, 56 yards, 4:02.**

**Top passers**

- ATL – Matt Ryan – 21/30, 321 yards, TD
- CHI – Mike Glennon – 26/40, 213 yards, TD

**Top rushers**

- ATL – Devonta Freeman – 12 rushes, 37 yards, TD
- CHI – Tarik Cohen – 5 rushes, 66 yards

**Top receivers**

- ATL – Austin Hooper – 2 receptions, 128 yards, TD
- CHI – Tarik Cohen – 8 receptions, 47 yards, TD

**Top tacklers**

- ATL – Brian Poole – 6 tackles, 1 assist, 1 sack
- CHI – Jerrell Freeman – 7 tackles, 3 assists

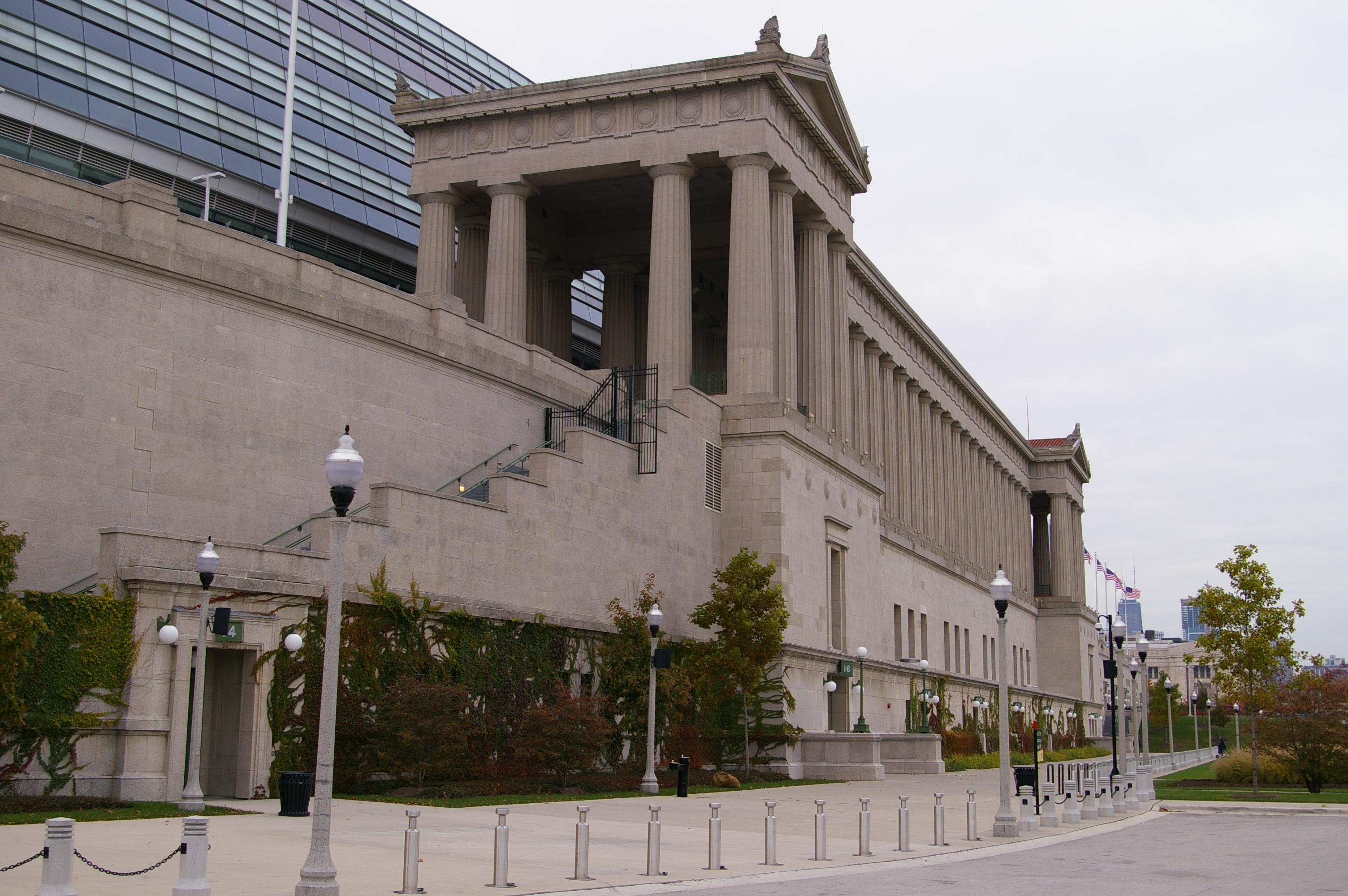
The Bears played all of their home games at Soldier Field.

For the season opener, the Bears were considered an obvious underdog as they faced the Atlanta Falcons, who appeared in Super Bowl LI a year earlier. After 26 total meetings, the Bears led the series 14–12; entering the 2017 game, the Bears had a two-game winning streak against the Falcons, with the most recent game in 2014 being a 27–13 victory. The offense, which ranked 15th in 2016 (17th in rushing and 14th passing), took on a Falcons defense that was ranked 25th (17th in run and 28th in pass). During his tenure with the Buccaneers, Mike Glennon completed 71.6 percent of his passes for 683 yards with six touchdowns, no interceptions, and a 109.2 passer rating against the Falcons. Although Glennon had strong stats against Atlanta, CBS Chicago writer and former Bears director of college scouting Greg Gabriel suggested the Bears should utilize its rushing attack due to a lack of options at receiver. Rookie running backs Tarik Cohen and Taquan Mizzell, both players with high agility, were recommended by Gabriel for use, as "gimmicks" are more effective at the start of the season due to a lack of preparation for them. The Bears' 15th-ranked defense (27th in run and seventh in pass) faced a Falcons offense led by 2016 MVP quarterback Matt Ryan and ranked second in offense (fifth in rushing and third in passing). Gabriel wrote the Bears defensive line and linebackers were among the best in the league, and played against a Falcons offensive line that was considered one of the weakest parts of the team. On the other hand, Gabriel added the Bears secondary was an area of concern, meaning the DL and LB corps were to be relied on to apply pressure to Ryan.

The Falcons' Matt Bryant kicked a 48-yard field goal on the opening drive. After the two teams exchanged punts, Connor Barth converted a 54-yard field goal at the start of the second quarter to tie the game. Although Devonta Freeman scored on a five-yard touchdown run, the Bears responded with a 75-yard drive featuring exclusively run plays. On the series, Cohen escaped two Falcons and shifted from the left side of the field to the right to record a 46-yard run. Cohen later took a direct snap from the center in the Wildcat formation and handed the ball to Jordan Howard, who received assistance on a block by Glennon to score a five-yard touchdown. The first three drives of the second half ended with a punt before Bryant kicked a 28-yard field goal. After another Chicago punt, the defense appeared to have forced a fourth down situation on Atlanta until Akiem Hicks was penalized for roughing the passer. Ryan capitalized by throwing to an open Austin Hooper, who stiff-arm fended Quintin Demps to score an 88-yard touchdown. Glennon threw a 19-yard touchdown pass to Cohen to decrease the gap to three points until Bryant kicked a 37-yard field goal. Down by six with 3:21 remaining in the game, Glennon drove the Bears downfield and reached the Falcons' five-yard line, but his first three passes to Josh Bellamy, Howard, and Miller fell incomplete. On fourth-and-five, Glennon was sacked by Brooks Reed for a turnover on downs. Ryan kneeled to seal the Bears' 23–17 defeat.

The loss marked the fourth straight opening week loss for the Bears.

==== Week 2: at Tampa Bay Buccaneers ====
Week Two: Chicago Bears at Tampa Bay Buccaneers – Game summary

Quarter	1	2	3	4	Total
Bears	0	0	0	7	**7**
**Buccaneers**	10	16	0	3	**29**

at Raymond James Stadium, Tampa, Florida

- Date: September 17
- Game time: 1:00 p.m. EDT/12:00 p.m. CDT
- Game weather: 88 °F (31 °C), clear
- Game attendance: 56,640
- Referee: Ronald Torbert
- TV announcers (Fox): Dick Stockton, Mark Schlereth and Shannon Spake
- Recap, Gamebook

Game information

**First quarter**

- Nick Folk 42 yard field goal. TB 3-0
- Jameis Winston 13 yard pass to Mike Evans. (Folk PAT) TB 10-0

**Second quarter**

- Jacquizz Rodgers 1 yard run. (Folk PAT) TB 17-0
- Robert McClain 47 yard interception return. (PAT missed) TB 23-0
- Nick Folk 50 yard field goal. TB 26-0

**Third quarter**

- No Scoring Plays

**Fourth quarter**

- Nick Folk 23 yard field goal. TB 29-0
- Mike Glennon 14 yard pass to Deonte Thompson. (Connor Barth PAT)

**Top passers**

- CHI – Mike Glennon – 31/45, 301 YDS, TD, 2 INT
- TB – Jameis Winston – 18/30, 204 YDS, TD

**Top rushers**

- CHI – Tarik Cohen – 7 RUSH, 13 YDS
- TB – Jacquizz Rodgers – 19 RUSH, 67 YDS, TD

**Top receivers**

- CHI – Kendall Wright – 7 REC, 69 YDS
- TB – Mike Evans – 7 REC, 93 YDS, TD

**Top tacklers**

- CHI – Eddie Jackson – 7 tackles, 1 assist
- TB – Lavonte David – 8 tackles, 1 assists

For the second week of the season, Mike Glennon returned to Raymond James Stadium to take on his former team, the Tampa Bay Buccaneers. Although the Bears led the all-time series 38–19 and had won three of the last four games, the Buccaneers routed the Bears 36–10 in their latest meeting in 2016. Chicago's 25th-ranked defense (tenth against the run and 27th against the pass) faced a Tampa offense spearheaded by quarterback Jameis Winston, who threw for 28 touchdowns and 18 interceptions for a passer rating of 86.1 passer rating in 2016. Winston's catchers included receivers Mike Evans and DeSean Jackson, along with tight ends Cameron Brate and O. J. Howard; Brate, an Illinois native and Bears fan, had excelled against his favorite team, recording a 46-yard catch in 2015 and a career-high seven receptions for 84 yards and a touchdown in 2016. Bears defensive coordinator Vic Fangio described the Bucs' tight ends as "good players. [Brate] has been a really good red-zone player for them. The quarterback is very comfortable throwing to him. He's got great route instincts and route-running ability and he's a very good catcher of the ball. Howard is a very good athlete with good size, a good blocker that can get down the field. They've got two really good weapons at tight end."

The Buccaneers opened the game with Nick Folk's 42-yard field goal. On Chicago's first drive, Glennon completed his first six passes before his pass for Dion Sims was intercepted by Kwon Alexander, and while the Bucs were forced to punt on the resulting series, Tarik Cohen attempted to field a bouncing punt as he was covered by two players, causing him to fumble. Tampa's Cameron Lynch recovered the loose ball, with Winston throwing a 13-yard touchdown pass to Evans on the next play. During the Bears' next series, Glennon was sacked by Noah Spence and fumbled, with the Bucs' Lavonte David recovering. Jacquizz Rodgers eventually scored on a one-yard touchdown run. Glennon's woes continued when he was intercepted by Robert McClain, who returned the 47 yards for a touchdown. Although Folk missed the extra point, he kicked a 50-yard field goal to give the Buccaneers a 26–0 lead by halftime. The Bears punted on the first drive of the second half, but reclaimed the ball when Charles Sims was stripped by Pernell McPhee and Leonard Floyd recovered, though the Bears failed to capitalize on the takeaway as they were forced to punt. Folk kicked a 23-yard field goal in the fourth quarter to increase the lead by 29 points. Chicago's next two drives reached Tampa's red zone, but both ended with turnovers on downs. With 1:43 left in the game, Glennon threw a 13-yard touchdown pass to Deonte Thompson, though it was too late to make a comeback.

==== Week 3: vs. Pittsburgh Steelers ====
Week Three: Pittsburgh Steelers at Chicago Bears – Game summary

Quarter	1	2	3	4	OT	Total
Steelers	0	7	7	3	0	**17**
**Bears**	7	10	0	0	6	**23**

at Soldier Field, Chicago, Illinois

- Date: September 24
- Game time: 12:00 p.m. CDT
- Game weather: 85 °F (29 °C), sunny
- Game attendance: 62,172
- Referee: Clete Blakeman
- TV announcers (CBS): Greg Gumbel, Trent Green and Jamie Erdahl
- Recap, Gamebook

Game information

**First quarter**

- Jordan Howard 3 yard run. (Connor Barth PAT) CHI 7-0

**Second quarter**

- Ben Roethlisberger 7 yard pass to Antonio Brown. (Chris Boswell PAT)
- Mike Glennon 2 yard pass to Adam Shaheen. (Barth PAT)
- Connor Barth 24 yard field goal.

**Third quarter**

- Le'Veon Bell 1 yard run. (Boswell PAT)

**Fourth quarter**

- Chris Boswell 32 yard field goal.

**Overtime**

- Jordan Howard 19 yard run.

**Top passers**

- PIT – Ben Roethlisberger – 22/39, 235 yards, TD
- CHI – Mike Glennon – 15/22, 101 yards, TD, INT

**Top rushers**

- PIT – Le'Veon Bell – 15 carries, 61 yards, TD
- CHI – Jordan Howard – 23 carries, 140 yards, 2 TDs

**Top receivers**

- PIT – Antonio Brown – 10 receptions, 110 yards, TD
- CHI – Jordan Howard – 5 receptions, 26 yards

**Top tacklers**

- PIT – Ryan Shazier – 11 tackles
- CHI – Danny Trevathan – 8 tackles, 2 assists

In week three, Chicago hosted the 2–0 Pittsburgh Steelers, who trailed the all-time series 18–7–1 and had not defeated the Bears since 2005. WBBM-TV writer Jeff Joniak described the Bears as in "clean-up mode" after a poor performance in Tampa. The battle between the Bears' rushing attack and the Steelers' run defense featured the former averaging just 2.9 yards per carry (27th in the league) taking on a defense that allowed just 74 yards per game and 3.3 yards per carry. Joniak added Chicago's running game should try to make progress on early downs to allow Mike Glennon to succeed against Pittsburgh. Defensively, Joniak wrote the Bears had "their hands full" as Steelers quarterback Ben Roethlisberger was aided by receivers Antonio Brown and Martavis Bryant, running back Le'Veon Bell, and tight end Jesse James. In spite of Pittsburgh's success in contrast with Chicago's struggles, a common belief was that the Steelers would often "play down to their competition," one that was spurned in the wake of Glennon's 2014 Buccaneers upsetting the Steelers 27–24.

The first two drives of the game ended with punts, but on the Bears' first punt of the game, Steelers returner Eli Rogers muffed the ball and Sherrick McManis recovered. Jordan Howard would score a three-yard touchdown run on the drive. On the Steelers' next drive, Roethlisberger was sacked by Bryce Callahan and fumbled, with Akiem Hicks recovering. The takeaway failed to result in points, however, as Connor Barth missed a 47-yard field goal. In the second quarter, Roethlisberger threw a seven-yard touchdown pass to Brown, which the Bears responded via Glennon's two-yard touchdown pass to Adam Shaheen. On the final play of the first half, Chris Boswell's 35-yard field goal was blocked by McManis into Marcus Cooper's hands. Cooper raced down the field before suddenly slowing down before he reached the end zone, which allowed Pittsburgh's Vance McDonald to knock the ball away at the one-yard line. The ball was then batted out of the end zone, which led to a penalty against the Steelers and an untimed play for the Bears. A false start penalty on Charles Leno prompted the Bears to instead kick a 24-yard field goal. In the second half, the Bears suffered their first turnover of the game when Howard was stripped by Ryan Shazier; the Steelers took advantage to score on Bell's one-yard touchdown run. A second giveaway occurred when Glennon's pass for Zach Miller was intercepted by J. J. Wilcox, which enabled the Steelers to tie the game on Boswell's 32-yard field goal. The game remained scoreless through the rest of the half, resulting in overtime. After winning the coin toss to start overtime with the ball, the Bears quickly scored on the second play of the series; Tarik Cohen broke through for a 73-yard touchdown run, but was ruled to have stepped out of bounds at the Steelers' 37-yard line. Two plays later, Howard scored the game-winning touchdown on a 19-yard run.

In claiming their first victory of the season, the Bears' running backs provided a solid performance, recording a combined 220 yards on the ground – 200 yards more than in week two. The defense also shone, forcing two turnovers after having just one in the first two games.

==== Week 4: at Green Bay Packers ====
Week Four: Chicago Bears at Green Bay Packers – Game summary

Quarter	1	2	3	4	Total
Bears	0	7	0	7	**14**
**Packers**	14	7	7	7	**35**

at Lambeau Field, Green Bay, Wisconsin

- Date: September 28
- Game time: 7:25 p.m. CDT
- Game weather: 65 °F (18 °C), cloudy with rain
- Game attendance: 78,362
- Referee: John Hussey
- TV announcers (CBS/NFLN/Amazon Video): Jim Nantz, Tony Romo, Tracy Wolfson and Jay Feely
- Recap, Gamebook

Game information

**First quarter**

- Aaron Rodgers 5 yard pass to Davante Adams. (Mason Crosby PAT)
- Aaron Rodgers 2 yard pass to Randall Cobb. (Crosby PAT)

**Second quarter**

- Aaron Jones 2 yard run. (Crosby PAT)
- Mike Glennon 5 yard pass to Kendall Wright. (Connor Barth PAT)

**Third quarter**

- Aaron Rodgers 4 yard pass to Jordy Nelson. (Crosby PAT)

**Fourth quarter**

- Aaron Rodgers 8 yard pass to Jordy Nelson. (Crosby PAT)
- Jordan Howard 3 yard run (Barth PAT)

**Top passers**

- CHI – Mike Glennon – 21/33, 218 yards, TD, 2 INT
- GB – Aaron Rodgers – 18/26, 179 yards, 4 TD

**Top rushers**

- CHI – Jordan Howard – 18 carries, 53 yards, TD
- GB – Aaron Jones – 13 carries, 49 yards, TD

**Top receivers**

- CHI – Kendall Wright – 4 receptions, 51 yards, TD
- GB – Jordy Nelson – 4 receptions, 75 yards, 2 TDs

**Top tacklers**

- CHI – Danny Trevathan – 6 tackles, 7 assists
- GB – Morgan Burnett – 6 tackles, 3 assists

Coming off their victory against Pittsburgh, the Bears traveled to Green Bay to take on the rival Packers. In 194 total games, the all-time series was tied 94–94–6, with the Packers having won all but three games since 2010. To challenge the Packers defense, Jeff Joniak wrote the Bears should utilize their running game; after the first three games of 2017, the Packers had allowed eight runs of at least ten yards, along with 5.7 rushing yards on first down. Jordan Howard and Tarik Cohen had eight and four runs of 10+ yards, respectively, with the former being the second-most in the NFL. A product of running the ball would be keeping Packers quarterback Aaron Rodgers off the field; Rodgers, who was 15–4 against the Bears, led the league in completions and passing first downs (49), along with second in passing yards. The Packers offense was ranked third in third down conversion percentage (48.8) and time of possession. However, the Packers offensive line was struggling with injuries, especially with five tackles hurt and three on injured reserve, which Joniak expected the Bears to capitalize on.

Rodgers opened the scoring on the first drive of the game, throwing a five-yard touchdown pass to Davante Adams. On the Bears' first offensive play, Glennon was sacked by Clay Matthews III and fumbled, with Green Bay's Jake Ryan recovering the ball. Another Packers score took place three plays later on Rodgers' two-yard throw to Randall Cobb. Chicago's woes continued when Cody Whitehair's snap bounced off Glennon and was recovered by Blake Martinez. Unlike the previous drive, the Packers were unable to score off the takeaway and were forced to punt. The next four series of the game also ended with punts. On Chicago's next possession, Glennon's pass for Markus Wheaton was intercepted by Ha Ha Clinton-Dix, which set up Rodgers' 58-yard pass to Jordy Nelson and Aaron Jones' two-yard touchdown run. With eight seconds left in the second quarter, Glennon threw a five-yard touchdown pass to Kendall Wright, completing a 72-yard drive that began with less than two minutes to go. On the Bears' first drive of the second half, Connor Barth missed a 47-yard field goal wide right, which led to Rodgers' four-yard touchdown pass to Nelson. On the drive, Danny Trevathan tackled Adams, but collided with his head in a helmet-to-helmet hit, causing the receiver to be sent off the field in a stretcher. A series later, Glennon had his fourth turnover of the game when his pass was intercepted by Kentrell Brice, which led to an eight-yard touchdown pass to Nelson. With 6:01 left in the game, Howard scored on a three-yard run to make the final score 35–14.

With the loss, the Bears trailed the all-time series for the first time since 1933. Although the Bears had built a strong lead for much of the rivalry, Packers quarterbacks Brett Favre and Rodgers had beaten the Bears 35 of 45 times; Rodgers had won 16 of 20 meetings. Trevathan apologized for the hit on Adams, explaining he was attempting to make a play. He was later suspended two games, though it was reduced to one game following an appeal. Trevathan's suspension resulted in glaringly worse depth for the linebackers, which had already lost Nick Kwiatkoski to a pectoral injury. John Timu, who had been on the practice squad at the start of the season, became the new leading inside linebacker in place Trevathan. The Monday after the game, Glennon was benched in favor of Mitchell Trubisky; Glennon's eight turnovers across the first four games of the season led the league.

==== Week 5: vs. Minnesota Vikings ====
Week Five: Minnesota Vikings at Chicago Bears – Game summary

Quarter	1	2	3	4	Total
**Vikings**	0	3	14	3	**20**
Bears	2	0	7	8	**17**

at Soldier Field, Chicago, Illinois

- Date: October 9
- Game time: 7:30 p.m. CDT
- Game weather: 70 °F (21 °C), partly cloudy
- Game attendance: 61,834
- Referee: Jerome Boger
- TV announcers (ESPN): Sean McDonough, Jon Gruden and Lisa Salters
- Recap, Gamebook

Game information

First quarter

- CHI – Sam Bradford sacked in the end zone by Leonard Floyd for a safety, 1:31. Bears 2–0.

Second quarter

- MIN – Kai Forbath 26-yard field goal, 1:02. Vikings 3–2. **Drive: 4 plays, 5 yards, 1:26.**

Third quarter

- MIN – Kyle Rudolph 13-yard pass from Case Keenum (Kai Forbath kick), 8:16. Vikings 10–2. **Drive: 13 plays, 75 yards, 6:44.**
- CHI – Benny Cunningham 38-yard pass from Pat O'Donnell (Connor Barth kick), 5:23. Vikings 10–9. **Drive: 7 plays, 75 yards, 2:53.**
- MIN – Jerick McKinnon 58-yard run (Kai Forbath kick), 3:31. Vikings 17–9. **Drive: 5 plays, 82 yards, 1:52.**

Fourth quarter

- CHI – Zach Miller 20-yard pass from Mitchell Trubisky (Mitchell Trubisky run), 12:24. Tied 17–17. **Drive: 11 plays, 79 yards, 6:07.**
- MIN – Kai Forbath 26-yard field goal, 0:12. Vikings 20–17. **Drive: 6 plays, 20 yards, 2:08.**

Top passers

- MIN – Case Keenum – 17/21, 140 yards, TD
- CHI – Mitchell Trubisky – 12/25, 128 yards, TD

Top rushers

- MIN – Jerick McKinnon – 16 rushes, 95 yards, TD
- CHI – Jordan Howard – 19 rushes, 76 yards

Top receivers

- MIN – Jerick McKinnon – 6 receptions, 51 yards
- CHI – Kendall Wright – 4 receptions, 46 yards

On Monday Night Football, Mitchell Trubisky made his NFL debut against the Minnesota Vikings, who led the all-time series 58–52–2, though the Bears had won all but two games at Soldier Field since 2007. Trubisky is the eleventh rookie quarterback in team history to start a game and the first since Kyle Orton in 2005, though only three won their first games (Jim McMahon, Rex Grossman, Craig Krenzel); furthermore, since 2009, only one of nine Bears quarterbacks won in their debuts with the team (Todd Collins). Jeff Joniak emphasized a focus on first down success; the Bears' rushing game, which averaged 5.3 yards per carry on first down in 2016, had just 3.7 yards in 2017, including 17 plays in which Jordan Howard and Tarik Cohen were tackled behind the line of scrimmage. Chicago took on a Minnesota defense that allowed just 71.2 yards per game, the third-least in the league. Instead, Joniak suggested relying on the passing attack; on first down, the Vikings allowed opposing quarterbacks to complete 80 percent of their passes for a 121.1 passer rating. The Bears also had to focus on improving their league-worst –7 turnover ratio; over the past three seasons, the team had a combined ratio of –31. For the Bears defense, Joniak wrote the unit had to prevent the Vikings from making big plays courtesy of Stefon Diggs and Adam Thielen, who had a combined 15 catches for at least 20 yards, while a combined 30 receptions resulted in first downs. Joniak further added the "excitement Trubisky brings into this game at Soldier Field" should be used by the "Bears to their advantage to keep the crowd engaged and loud."

Trubisky led the Bears into Vikings territory on the opening drive, but a holding penalty on Cody Whitehair pushed the offense back before the Bears punted. The Vikings were unable to exit their side of the field on their first two drives and were forced to punt; likewise, the Bears reached Minnesota's side before punting on their drives. Late in the first quarter, Sam Bradford was sacked by Leonard Floyd in the end zone for a safety. In the second quarter, Trubisky was strip-sacked by Everson Griffen, which resulted in the Vikings' Linval Joseph recovering. Kai Forbath kicked a 26-yard field goal to give the Vikings a 3–2 lead. Bradford, who was sacked three times in the first half, was replaced by Case Keenum for the remainder of the game. On the Vikings' first drive of the second half, Keenum threw a 13-yard touchdown pass to Kyle Rudolph, to which the Bears responded with a trick play: on fourth down, punter Pat O'Donnell instead threw a pass to Benny Cunningham, who escaped two Vikings to score on the 38-yard play. The Bears defense suffered another loss when reserve linebacker John Timu suffered a knee injury. A play later, Minnesota's Jerick McKinnon ran 58 yards for the touchdown. Down 17–9, Trubisky answered with a 79-yard drive that ended with a 20-yard touchdown pass to Zach Miller, who caught a pass that had been tipped by Andrew Sendejo. Now trailing by just two points, the Bears elected to go for a two-point conversion, on which they attempted another trick play: Trubisky handed the ball to Howard on what appeared to be a draw play until Howard gave it to Miller, who was running in the opposite direction. Trubisky ran alongside Miller on a reverse option play, catching a lateral from the tight end when Miller was stopped by Anthony Barr, allowing the quarterback to run into the end zone unscathed. The next three series ended with punts. With 2:32 remaining in the game and pinned at his team's ten-yard line, Trubisky's pass for Miller was intercepted by Harrison Smith, which set up Forbath's game-winning 26-yard field goal with 12 seconds to go. On the final play of the game, Trubisky passed to Markus Wheaton, who lateraled to Cohen before he was tackled to end the game.

In his debut, Trubisky completed 12 of 25 passes for 128 yards, one touchdown, one interception, and a 60.1 passer rating. He also had three rushing attempts for 22 yards. John Fox reflected on Trubisky's first game by connecting it to Joe Montana's before adding he was "not making comparisons at this point. But [Trubisky] will do nothing but get better."

==== Week 6: at Baltimore Ravens ====
Week Six: Chicago Bears at Baltimore Ravens – Game summary

Quarter	1	2	3	4	OT	Total
**Bears**	0	10	7	7	3	**27**
Ravens	0	3	7	14	0	**24**

at M&T Bank Stadium, Baltimore, Maryland

- Date: October 15
- Game time: 1:00 p.m. EDT/12:00 p.m. CDT
- Game weather: 69 °F (21 °C), partly sunny
- Game attendance: 70,616
- Referee: Ed Hochuli
- TV announcers (Fox): Sam Rosen, Ronde Barber and Kristina Pink
- Recap, Gamebook

Game information

**First quarter**

- no scoring plays

**Second quarter**

- CHI – Connor Barth 24 yard field goal, 10:54. Bears 3–0. **Drive: 10 plays, 60 yards, 4:19.**
- CHI – Zach Miller 21 yard pass from Tarik Cohen (Connor Barth kick good), 2:53. Bears 10–0. **Drive: 2 plays, 20 yards, 0:43.**
- BAL – Justin Tucker 27 yard field goal, 0:03. Bears 10–3. **Drive: 12 plays, 55 yards, 1:37.**

**Third quarter**

- CHI – Dion Sims 27 yard pass from Mitchell Trubisky (Connor Barth kick good), 6:01. Bears 17–3. **Drive: 7 plays, 66 yards, 3:41.**
- BAL – Bobby Rainey 96 yard kickoff return (Justin Tucker kick good), 5:47. Bears 17–10.

**Fourth quarter**

- BAL – Justin Tucker 31 yard field goal, 11:26. Bears 17–13. **Drive: 10 plays, 26 yards, 3:58.**
- CHI – Adrian Amos 91 yard interception return (Connor Barth kick good), 5:08. Bears 24–13
- BAL – Justin Tucker 50 yard field goal, 2:56. Bears 24–16. **Drive: 10 plays, 44 yards, 2:12.**
- BAL – Michael Campanaro 77 yard punt return (Nick Boyle pass from Joe Flacco good). Tied 24–24

**Overtime**

- CHI – Connor Barth 40 yard field goal, 2:06. Bears 27–24. **Drive: 8 plays, 71 yards, 5:40.**

**Top passers**

- CHI – Mitchell Trubisky – 8/16, 113 yards, TD
- BAL – Joe Flacco – 24/41, 180 yards, 2 INT

**Top rushers**

- CHI – Jordan Howard – 36 rushes, 167 yards
- BAL – Alex Collins – 15 rushes, 74 yards

**Top receivers**

- CHI – Dion Sims – 4 receptions, 42 yards, TD
- BAL – Chris Moore – 8 receptions, 28 yards

**Top tacklers**

- CHI – Adrian Amos, Christian Jones (American football) – 6 tackles, 2 assists, INT
- BAL – Matthew Judon – 12 tackles, 2 sacks

In week six, the Bears traveled to M&T Bank Stadium to play the 3–2 Baltimore Ravens, whom the Bears led 3–2 in five all-time meetings. The series had been a see-saw in victors, with the winning team alternating each time; the Bears won the most recent game in 2013 23–20, but the Ravens won the latest game in Baltimore (a 31–7 rout in 2009). For the Bears offense, the unit hoped to provide more support for Mitchell Trubisky in his first NFL away game. "The kid's going to be special and we've got to do our jobs around him; keep getting in the right spot, make plays and catch the football, and making sure we're keeping him out of first-and-17s," offensive coordinator Dowell Loggains stated. "We have a lot of faith and confidence in Mitchell." To do this, USA Today's Lorin Cox wrote the offensive line needed to stop Ravens nose tackle Michael Pierce, whose 13 stops in 2017 tied for fifth among defensive linemen. On defense, the Bears entered the game with the sixth-ranked defense (allowing 305 yards per game) that also ranked ninth in average yards allowed per play (5.07). With Danny Trevathan returning from suspension, the defense faced a Ravens offense that ranked sixth in rushing with 130.4 yards per game. On the other hand, Baltimore's offensive line – particularly the guards – had been struggling due to injuries, and Cox wrote the defense should take advantage of the openings. While the Bears had yet to record an interception in 2017, Ravens quarterback Joe Flacco had thrown 33 in his last 31 games, including one in ten consecutive games; Cox added, "It's up to this defense to actually finish the turnover."

The first five drives of the game ended with punts. The Bears opted for a run-based attack for much of the game; on their first scoring drive in the second quarter, all but one play was a run, with the series ending on Connor Barth's 24-yard field goal. On the Ravens' next drive, Maxx Williams was stripped by Christian Jones and Trevathan recovered the loose ball. Although the Bears were unable to capitalize on the takeaway, the defense recorded another turnover on the next drive when Bryce Callahan intercepted Flacco's pass intended for Breshad Perriman. On a halfback option, Tarik Cohen eventually threw a 21-yard touchdown pass to Zach Miller to put the Bears up 10–0. Justin Tucker kicked a 27-yard field goal to put the Ravens on the scoreboard with three seconds remaining in the first half. During the third quarter, Trubisky led a 66-yard drive that ended with a 27-yard touchdown pass to Dion Sims. During the ensuing kickoff, Joshua Bellamy appeared to trip Ravens kick returner Bobby Rainey, but Rainey instead got back up and ran 96 yards for a touchdown. Upon review, the referees determined Bellamy's hand did not touch Rainey. Subsequently, the Bears committed two turnovers: Cohen fumbled at the Bears' 39-yard line – which set up Tucker's 31-yard field goal to narrow the gap to four points – and Trubisky was strip-sacked by Lardarius Webb with C. J. Mosley recovering. The Ravens reached the Bears' 30-yard line, where Flacco was intercepted by Adrian Amos, who returned his first career interception 90 yards for the touchdown to put the Bears up by 11 points with 5:08 left in the game. However, Tucker kicked a 50-yard field goal with 2:53 remaining, while Michael Campanaro scored on a 77-yard punt return touchdown and Flacco completed the two-point conversion to Nick Boyle to tie the game at 24 apiece and enter overtime. Neither team was able to score on their first drive; on Chicago's second series, the offense was pinned at its own seven-yard line. Jordan Howard recorded a 53-yard run on the first play of the possession, which was later followed by Trubisky's 18-yard pass to Kendall Wright on third down to draw the Bears closer. Barth kicked a 40-yard field goal to win the game.

It was the Bears' first road victory since 2015 against the Buccaneers, breaking a ten-game losing streak. The Bears' rushing attack resulted in a career high 167 rushing yards on 36 carries for Howard, while Cohen had 14 carries for 32 yards. Trubisky threw just 16 passes, completing eight for 113 yards and a touchdown. John Fox explained the Ravens were the reason for the run-based strategy, having used the same philosophy with the 2012 Denver Broncos; in that team's game against Baltimore, the Broncos ran 44 times against just 21 passing plays despite the presence of Peyton Manning.

==== Week 7: vs. Carolina Panthers ====
Week Seven: Carolina Panthers at Chicago Bears – Game summary

Quarter	1	2	3	4	Total
Panthers	0	3	0	0	**3**
**Bears**	7	10	0	0	**17**

at Soldier Field, Chicago, Illinois

- Date: October 22
- Game time: 12:00 p.m. CDT
- Game weather: 70 °F (21 °C), cloudy with periods of rain, thunder possible
- Game attendance: 61,256
- Referee: Walt Anderson
- TV announcers (CBS): Ian Eagle, Dan Fouts and Evan Washburn
- Recap, Gamebook

Game information

**First quarter**

- CHI – Eddie Jackson 75-yard fumble return (Connor Barth kick), 8:59. Bears 7–0.

**Second quarter**

- CHI – Eddie Jackson 76-yard interception return (Connor Barth kick), 12:28. Bears 14–0.
- CAR – Graham Gano 36-yard field goal, 3:18. Bears 14–3. **Drive: 16 plays, 56 yards, 9:10.**
- CHI – Connor Barth 19-yard field goal, 1:10. Bears 17–3. **Drive: 5 plays, 74 yards, 2:08.**

**Third quarter**

- No scoring plays

**Fourth quarter**

- No scoring plays

**Top passers**

- CAR – Cam Newton – 21/34, 211 yards, 2 INT
- CHI – Mitchell Trubisky – 4/7, 107 yards

**Top rushers**

- CAR – Cam Newton – 9 rushes, 50 yards
- CHI – Jordan Howard – 21 rushes, 65 yards

**Top receivers**

- CAR – Christian McCaffrey – 7 receptions, 36 yards
- CHI – Zach Miller – 2 receptions, 29 yards

**Top tacklers**

- CAR – Shaq Thompson – 4 tackles, 2 assists
- CHI – Christian Jones – 9 tackles, 2 assists

Chicago hosted the Carolina Panthers, who trailed the all-time series 5–4, in week seven. With the exception of a playoff loss in 2005, the Bears had won every meeting at Soldier Field. Jeff Joniak stressed a run-heavy offense; although the Panthers had not allowed a 100-yard rusher nor 100-yard receiver in 2017, the lack of linebacker Luke Kuechly weakened the Panthers defense. Furthermore, Jordan Howard was averaging 2.1 yards per carry, while his 245 rushing yards after contact was the second-highest in the league behind the Kansas City Chiefs' Kareem Hunt. For the defense, the unit needed to contain Cam Newton by preventing the scramble-skilled quarterback from running, while also dealing with Kelvin Benjamin, Christian McCaffrey, and Ed Dickson.

The Bears started the game on a strong note when Newton's pitch to Curtis Samuel was dropped and recovered by Eddie Jackson, who returned the fumble for a 75-yard touchdown. The next three drives ended with punts, with Chicago's next series stalling after Mitchell Trubisky was sacked for a nine-yard loss on Carolina's 25-yard line. Connor Barth's 52-yard field goal attempt was partially blocked by Kawann Short and hit the crossbar. On the Panthers' following possession, Newton's pass for Benjamin was broken up by Prince Amukamara and intercepted by Jackson, resulting in a 76-yard pick six. Graham Gano kicked a 36-yard field goal, which the Bears responded with Trubisky's 70-yard pass to Tarik Cohen to set the offense up at the five-yard line. Howard's two carries were stopped, while Trubisky's touchdown run on third down was overturned as he was down before crossing the goal line. This resulted in 19-yarder by Barth to make the score 17–3 at halftime. In the second half, neither team was able to score as all but two drives concluded with a punt: on the Panthers' first series of the second half, Newton's attempt to run on fourth down and two was stopped by Eddie Goldman, while in the fourth quarter, Danny Trevathan intercepted a pass by Newton.

The victory marked Chicago's second consecutive win, the first time the Bears had done so since November 2015. Jackson's two scores made him the first player in NFL history to record two defensive touchdowns of at least 75 yards in a game; as a whole, the defense excelled as it sacked Newton a season-high five times and forced three turnovers. In contrast to the defensive success, the offense was restricted to just five first downs and 153 total yards, while converting just two of eleven third down situations. In the second half, the offense was forced to punt on four straight drives and ended the day having allowed four total sacks. Trubisky completed just four of seven passes, making him the first quarterback since the 2011 Denver Broncos' Tim Tebow to win a game while completing less than five passes; coincidentally, Tebow's head coach was also John Fox. While coaching the Panthers in 2006, Fox's team defeated the Falcons as quarterback Chris Weinke also completed four of seven passes.

==== Week 8: at New Orleans Saints ====
Week Eight: Chicago Bears at New Orleans Saints – Game summary

Quarter	1	2	3	4	Total
Bears	0	3	3	6	**12**
**Saints**	7	7	0	6	**20**

at Mercedes-Benz Superdome, New Orleans, Louisiana

- Date: October 29
- Game time: 12:00 p.m. CDT
- Game weather: Played indoors (dome stadium)
- Game attendance: 73,192
- Referee: Carl Cheffers
- TV announcers (Fox): Justin Kutcher, Chris Spielman and Jennifer Hale
- Recap, Gamebook

Game information

**First quarter**

- NO – Alvin Kamara 8-yard run (Wil Lutz kick), 11:08. Saints 7–0. **Drive: 7 plays, 81 yards, 3:52.**

**Second quarter**

- CHI – Connor Barth 27-yard field goal, 14:52. Saints 7–3. **Drive: 10 plays, 67 yards, 5:25.**
- NO – Mark Ingram II 1-yard run (Wil Lutz kick), 3:41. Saints 14–3. **Drive: 8 plays, 80 yards, 4:30.**

**Third quarter**

- CHI – Connor Barth 44-yard field goal, 5:42. Saints 14–6. **Drive: 8 plays, 72 yards, 3:31.**

**Fourth quarter**-

- NO – Wil Lutz 45-yard field goal, 12:54. Saints 17–6. **Drive: 7 plays, 26 yards, 2:26.**
- CHI – Tarik Cohen 1-yard run (pass failed), 3:58. Saints 17–12. **Drive: 10 plays, 72 yards, 3:34.**
- NO – Wil Lutz 49-yard field goal, 1:35. Saints 20–12. **Drive: 4 plays, 7 yards, 0:16.**

**Top passers**

- CHI – Mitchell Trubisky – 14/32, 164 yards, INT
- NO – Drew Brees – 23/28, 299 yards

**Top rushers**

- CHI – Jordan Howard – 23 rushes, 102 yards
- NO – Mark Ingram II – 18 rushes, 75 yards, TD

**Top receivers**

- CHI – Tre McBride – 3 receptions, 92 yards
- NO – Michael Thomas – 7 receptions, 77 yards

**Top tacklers**

- CHI – Danny Trevathan – 9 tackles, 4 assists
- NO – Kenny Vaccaro – 6 tackles, 3 assists

During the eighth week of the season, the Bears went to the Mercedes-Benz Superdome to play the New Orleans Saints, who trailed the series 15–14 but had won every meeting since 2011. Jeff Joniak wrote a goal of the Bears offense would be to get into scoring position; since Mitchell Trubisky became the starter, the offense had entered the red zone only twice in three games, with both trips ending in field goals. Upon reaching the 20-yard line, using the running game would be ideal; Jordan Howard ranked fifth in the league in rushing, second in yards after contact, and led the offense rushing first downs with 32. In contrast, the Saints defense ranked 30th in rushing yards allowed per carry. Joniak also emphasized the need for Trubisky to tune out the loud Superdome crowd and lead the offense without making errors. For the defense, it faced Drew Brees, who, according to Joniak, was to be pressured quickly if the Bears were to succeed – while being blitzed, Brees was intercepted three times and sacked twice. Otherwise, Brees was successful in quickly passing the ball for gains of six yards in a fast-paced offense. Turnovers were also priority; in the last two games, the Bears had forced six and scored on three, and while Brees had recorded turnovers in his last two games, the Saints still had the fifth-best turnover difference.

On the Saints' opening possession, Wil Lutz was lining up for a 32-yard field goal attempt when Kyle Fuller was penalized for jumping offsides. This set up Alvin Kamara's eight-yard touchdown run to put New Orleans up by seven points. After the next two drives resulted in punts, Connor Barth made a 27-yard field goal in the second quarter, though Mark Ingram II scored on a one-yard touchdown run. Barth missed a 48-yard field goal wide left late in the first half as the Bears entered halftime with an 11-point deficit. In the third quarter, Trubisky threw a 25-yard touchdown pass to Zach Miller, who landed on his knee and dislocated it in the process. The touchdown was eventually nullified when referee Carl Cheffers determined Miller had let go of the ball in pain while on the ground. The Bears were forced to settle for Barth's 44-yard field goal. In the fourth quarter, Lutz kicked a 45-yard field goal to increase the lead to 17–6. With 7:32 remaining in the game, Jonathan Bullard stripped Ingram and Christian Jones recovered the fumble. Aided by Trubisky's 46-yard run, Tarik Cohen dove into the end zone from the Saints' one-yard line to score the offense's first touchdown in 25 series (dating back to the Baltimore game). The Bears failed to score on the two-point conversion but were just five points down. Chicago forced another takeaway when Adrian Amos stripped and recovered the ball from Ingram with 2:12 left. Although the Bears turned the ball over on downs, they had another chance after Lutz's 49-yard field goal put them behind by eight points. However, Trubisky's pass for Tre McBride was intercepted by Marshon Lattimore to seal the loss.

Miller was taken to the University Medical Center New Orleans for treatment. In addition to a dislocated knee, Miller was revealed to have torn the popliteal artery in his region, an injury that is common in car accidents and raised the possibility of amputation. Vascular surgery was successfully completed the day after the game. The overturning of Miller's catch was controversial. Cheffers defended the call, stating when Miller was falling to the turf, he "has to survive the ground. He went to the ground, he temporarily lost control of the ball. The ball hit the ground; therefore it's incomplete." The NFL's Vice President of Officiating Alberto Riveron also maintained Miller had not completed the catch, but predecessors Mike Pereira and Dean Blandino argued otherwise. "At some point the process of the catch ends, and it ends when he rolls over on the ground with control. It was ruled a catch on the field. I didn't see anything definitive to overturn it and quite frankly, if it had been ruled incomplete on the field, if it had been me in the command center, I would have reversed it to a catch," Blandino said. On Monday, John Fox announced he would send video of the play to the NFL.

==== Week 10: vs. Green Bay Packers ====
Week Ten: Green Bay Packers at Chicago Bears – Game summary

Quarter	1	2	3	4	Total
**Packers**	3	7	3	10	**23**
Bears	3	3	0	10	**16**

at Soldier Field, Chicago, Illinois

- Date: November 12
- Game time: 12:00 p.m. CST
- Game weather: 39 °F (4 °C), rain
- Game attendance: 61,285
- Referee: Tony Corrente
- TV announcers (Fox): Thom Brennaman, Chris Spielman and Peter Schrager
- Recap, Gamebook

Game information

First quarter

- GB – Mason Crosby 40-yard field goal, 7:25. Packers 3–0. **Drive: 11 plays, 70 yards, 4:37.**
- CHI – Connor Barth 45-yard field goal, 2:21. Tied 3–3. **Drive: 8 plays, 53 yards, 5:05.**

Second quarter

- GB – Ty Montgomery 37-yard run (Mason Crosby kick), 11:49. Packers 10–3. **Drive: 3 plays, 79 yards, 1:43.**
- CHI – Connor Barth 44-yard field goal, 0:01. Packers 10–6. **Drive: 10 plays, 39 yards, 1:37.**

Third quarter

- GB – Mason Crosby 24-yard field goal, 10:20. Packers 13–6. **Drive: 10 plays, 40 yards, 4:44.**

Fourth quarter

- GB – Mason Crosby 50-yard field goal, 13:14. Packers 16–6. **Drive: 10 plays, 26 yards, 4:20.**
- CHI – Josh Bellamy 46-yard pass from Mitchell Trubisky (Connor Barth kick), 10:48. Packers 16–13. **Drive: 4 plays, 70 yards, 2:30.**
- GB – Davante Adams 19-yard pass from Brett Hundley (Mason Crosby kick), 5:37. Packers 23–13. **Drive: 8 plays, 75 yards, 5:10.**
- CHI – Connor Barth 49-yard field goal, 3:23. Packers 23–16. **Drive: 8 plays, 49 yards, 2:10.**
- GB – Brett Hundley – 18/25, 212 yards, TD
- CHI – Mitchell Trubisky – 21/35, 297 yards, TD

Top rushers

- GB – Jamaal Williams – 20 rushes, 67 yards
- CHI – Jordan Howard – 15 rushes, 54 yards

Top receivers

- GB – Davante Adams – 5 receptions, 90 yards, TD
- CHI – Dontrelle Inman – 6 receptions, 88 yards

Although the Bears now trailed the Packers in the all-time series, they were the five-point favorite against Green Bay among bookkeepers for the first time since week sixteen of 2008. The odds had been influenced by Aaron Rodgers' season-ending collarbone injury in October along with backup quarterback Brett Hundley's struggles in the previous week's 30–17 loss to the Lions. Although the Bears had not defeated the Packers at home since 2010, the Packers were 2–3 since the two teams' last meeting in week four, while Green Bay head coach Mike McCarthy was 1–3 against the Bears without Rodgers. Jeff Joniak described his ideal Bears offensive gameplan as "[p]laying a clean game" to avoid swinging the "tempo or momentum in favor of a team that's on a three-game losing streak." To do this, Mitchell Trubisky would have to avoid getting sacked, while the running game would have to reduce its runs resulting in negative yardage. Through the air, the Bears remained an unknown entity due to a lack of available film on Trubisky and receivers Markus Wheaton and Dontrelle Inman, the latter making his Bears debut in week ten after being traded to the team in late October. On defense, Joniak wrote the unit needed to prevent Hundley from developing his accuracy, especially as the Chicago defense was excelling in preventing touchdowns, along with containing running back Ty Montgomery, who recorded 162 rushing yards on 16 carries against the Bears in week sixteen last year.

In a game that ChicagoBears.com writer Larry Mayer described as having "[reverted] to an early-season trend, the Bears shot themselves in the foot repeatedly," Chicago struggled with penalties during the game as the team committed seven in the first half. The Bears punted on the first drive, which led to an exchanging of field goals on Mason Crosby's 40- and Connor Barth's 45-yard kicks. Three drives later, in the second quarter, Montgomery scored on a 37-yard touchdown run to give the Packers the lead. On the next drive, Trubisky threw a screen pass to Benny Cunningham, who ran to the Packers' goal line and dived for the pylon. His knee landed out of bounds and the play was ruled as such at the two-yard line, which the Bears challenged with the belief that the ball had reached the pylon before he went out; instead, the challenge went against the Bears when it was determined he had lost the ball before it had touched the pylon, resulting in a touchback and possession being granted to the Packers. Chicago eventually added three more points on Barth's 44-yard field goal as time expired in the first half. Crosby kicked a 24-yard field goal on the first drive of the second half, which was followed by one from 50 yards in the fourth quarter. The Bears ended their touchdown-scoring troubles (scoring just one touchdown in 35 drives across the previous four games) when Trubisky threw a 46-yard touchdown pass to Josh Bellamy, who escaped Davon House for the score. However, the Packers responded with a 75-yard drive that ended with Hundley's 19-yard touchdown pass to Davante Adams. Barth added a 49-yard field goal to draw the Bears within a touchdown, and remained in contention when Crosby missed a 35-yarder wide right with 1:02 left in the game. After completing an 11-yard pass to Kendall Wright, Trubisky's next three passes were incomplete. On fourth-and-ten, Trubisky passed to Cunningham for five yards, who lateraled to Hroniss Grasu and ran two yards before he was tackled for a turnover on downs.

==== Week 11: vs. Detroit Lions ====
Week Eleven: Detroit Lions at Chicago Bears – Game summary

Quarter	1	2	3	4	Total
**Lions**	0	21	0	6	**27**
Bears	10	7	0	7	**24**

at Soldier Field, Chicago, Illinois

- Date: November 19
- Game time: 12:00 p.m. CDT
- Game weather: 33 °F (1 °C), partly cloudy
- Game attendance: 60,635
- Referee: Gene Steratore
- TV announcers (Fox): Thom Brennaman, Chris Spielman and Peter Schrager
- Recap, Gamebook

Game information

**First quarter**

- Connor Barth 23 yard Field Goal, 8:24. Bears 3-0. **Drive: 13 plays, 70 yards, 6:39**
- Adam Shaheen 1 yard pass from Mitchell Trubisky. (Connor Barth kick), 3:29. Bears 10-0. **Drive: 3 plays, 55 yards, 1:23**

**Second quarter**

- DJ Hayden 27 yard fumble return. (Matt Prater kick), 14:09. Bears 10-7.
- Jordan Howard 12 yard run. (Connor Barth kick), 8:36. Bears 17-7. **Drive: 8 plays, 78 yards, 5:30**
- Marvin Jones 28 yard pass from Matthew Stafford. (Matt Prater kick), 5:24. Bears 17-14. **Drive: 7 plays, 86 yards, 3:13**
- Ameer Abdullah 2 yard rush. (Matt Prater kick), 0:24. Lions 21-17 **Drive: 8 plays, 72 yards, 3:15**

**Third quarter**

**Fourth quarter**

- Matt Prater 27 yard field goal, 10:04. Lions 24-17. **Drive: 12 plays, 63 yards, 7:05**
- Tarik Cohen 15 yard run. (Connor Barth kick), 5:09. Tied 24-24. **Drive: 8 plays, 78 yards, 4:59**
- Matt Prater 52 yard field goal, 1:40. Lions 27-24. **Drive: 9 plays, 76 yards, 3:27**

**Top passers**

- DET – Matthew Stafford – 21/31, 299 yards, 2 touchdowns
- CHI – Mitchell Trubisky – 18/30, 179 yards, touchdown

**Top rushers**

- DET – Theo Riddick – 9 carries, 35 yards
- CHI – Jordan Howard – 15 carries, 125 yards, touchdown

**Top receivers**

- DET – Marvin Jones – 4 catches, 85 yards, touchdown
- CHI – Dontrelle Inman – 3 catches, 43 yards

**Top tacklers**

- DET – Tahir Whitehead – 8 tackles, 1 assist
- CHI – Christian Jones – 6 tackles, 2 assists, sack

In week eleven, the Bears hosted the Detroit Lions, whom the Bears led 97–72–5 in the all-time series but had defeated only once since 2013. Entering the game, Mitchell Trubisky hoped to improve on his productive game against the Packers in addition to reducing sacks; in five starts, he had been sacked 16 times, including five times last week. Larry Mayer also raised the possibility of using Tarik Cohen more frequently; after catching a combined 24 passes in the first four games, he had just one in the last five, a trend that Dowell Loggains explained was a result of Cohen's inexperience. Questions surrounded the defense, which went from forcing eight turnovers across three straight games to allowing a season-high 160 yards and no takeaways against the Packers. "You've got to have a short memory in this league," Akiem Hicks stated. "You've got to take it game-by-game. [...] But at the end of the day, you've got to lock into your next opponent because they don't care what happened last week. They want to beat you. So you have to have that mindset where, 'OK, you didn't get the results you want last week, but you're coming in fighting this week.'"

The Bears offense made early progress on the opening drive as it reached the Lions' five-yard line before stalling and settling for Connor Barth's 23-yard field goal. On Detroit's first series, Matthew Stafford was sacked by Nick Kwiatkoski and fumbled, with Hicks recovering the ball; the Bears capitalized on the takeaway via Jordan Howard's 50-yard run and Trubisky's one-yard touchdown pass to Adam Shaheen. The Lions scored on a turnover of their own when Trubisky fumbled Cody Whitehair's snap, which Detroit's D. J. Hayden picked up and returned 27 yards for the touchdown. Chicago answered with a 78-yard drive that ended with Howard's 12-yard touchdown run to make the score 17–7 midway through the second quarter. However, Stafford threw two touchdown passes to Marvin Jones and Ameer Abdullah to put the Lions up 21–17 by halftime. The third quarter went scoreless before Matt Prater kicked a 27-yard field goal in the fourth quarter to increase the margin by seven points. With 5:02 left in the game, the Bears drove 78 yards and tied the game on Cohen's 15-yard touchdown run, in which he dove over safety Glover Quin into the end zone. Prater converted a 52-yard field goal to give the Lions the lead once again with 1:52 remaining. Trubisky led the offense down the field, including one play on fourth-and-13 in which he kept the drive alive via a 19-yard scramble, but Barth missed the game-tying 46-yard field goal wide right. Stafford kneeled once to seal the Bears loss.

A day after the loss, Barth was released and replaced by Cairo Santos. In two seasons with the Bears, Barth converted 29 of 39 field goals, including 11 of 16 in 2017; all five of his misses were of at least 40 yards. Santos had been with the Chiefs since 2014, made 31 of 35 in 2016 (the fifth-highest conversion percentage in the league), and recorded a career-high 55.8 touchback percentage on kickoffs. In three games with Kansas City in 2017, Santos made all three of his field goals and all six of his extra points, but re-aggravated a groin injury from Training Camp in week three and was released.

==== Week 12: at Philadelphia Eagles ====
Week Twelve: Chicago Bears at Philadelphia Eagles – Game summary

Quarter	1	2	3	4	Total
Bears	0	0	3	0	**3**
**Eagles**	7	17	0	7	**31**

at Lincoln Financial Field, Philadelphia, Pennsylvania

- Date: November 26
- Game time: 1:00 p.m. EST/12:00 p.m. CST
- Game weather: 49 °F (9 °C), sunny
- Game attendance: 69,596
- Referee: Walt Coleman
- TV announcers (Fox): Kevin Burkhardt, Charles Davis and Pam Oliver
- Recap, Gamebook

Game information

**First quarter**

- PHI – Zach Ertz 17-yard pass from Carson Wentz (Jake Elliott kick), 6:04. Eagles 7–0. **Drive: 8 plays, 44 yards, 3:36.**

**Second quarter**

- PHI – Nelson Agholor 15-yard pass from Carson Wentz (Jake Elliott kick), 10:52. Eagles 14–0. **Drive: 9 plays, 56 yards, 5:27.**
- PHI – Jake Elliott 45-yard field goal, 6:52. Eagles 17–0. **Drive: 5 plays, 18 yards, 2:29.**
- PHI – Alshon Jeffery 8-yard pass from Carson Wentz (Jake Elliott kick), 0:05. Eagles 24–0. **Drive: 13 plays, 69 yards, 4:33.**

**Third quarter**

- CHI – Cairo Santos 38-yard field goal, 8:40. Eagles 24–3. **Drive: 10 plays, 36 yards, 6:20.**

**Fourth quarter**

- PHI – Nelson Agholor 0-yard fumble return (Jake Elliott kick), 13:37. Eagles 31–3. **Drive: 6 plays, 73 yards, 2:25.**

**Top passers**

- CHI – Mitchell Trubisky: 17/33, 147 yards, 2 INT
- PHI – Carson Wentz: 23/36, 227 yards, 3 TD

**Top rushers**

- CHI – Mitchell Trubisky: 4 rushes, 12 yards
- PHI – LeGarrette Blount: 15 rushes, 97 yards

**Top receivers**

- CHI – Dontrelle Inman: 4 receptions, 64 yards
- PHI – Zach Ertz: 10 receptions, 103 yards, TD

For week twelve's game, the Bears visited Lincoln Financial Field to play the 9–1 and league-leading Eagles. Although the Bears led the all-time series 30–14–1, they had not defeated the Eagles since 2011, while also losing their most recent game in Philadelphia in 2013 54–11. To take on the Eagles defense, Jeff Joniak elaborated on using a rushing attack that ranked fifth in the league, along with keeping Mitchell Trubisky protected and scoring points; entering the game, the Eagles were allowing less than 19 points per game. Defensively, the Bears faced quarterback Carson Wentz, who led the league in touchdown passes with three, and an offense that ranked first in scoring; eleven different players on the Eagles had scored a touchdown in 2017. With Danny Trevathan and Leonard Floyd out due to injuries, the backups were also challenged by a rushing unit featuring LeGarrette Blount and Jay Ajayi, which ranked second in the NFL. Philadelphia also succeeded in developing high margins of victory, winning by more than 15 points per game, and scoring at least 26 points in every game but their only loss in week two. Despite the stacked odds, as the Bears were able to defeat three perennial playoff teams in Pittsburgh, Baltimore, and Carolina, Joniak wrote the team had to "believe [victory over the Eagles] can happen, and the longer they hang around, the more they will believe."

The two teams traded punts to start the game, though the Eagles struck first on Wentz's 17-yard touchdown pass to Zach Ertz. On the first play of the Bears' next drive, Trubisky's pass to Tre McBride was batted and intercepted by Malcolm Jenkins, but Dion Sims stripped the ball away and McBride recovered to continue the series. Four plays later, the Bears punted, but got the ball back after the Eagles' first play of their drive; Blount broke free for a 35-yard run, but Adrian Amos forced a fumble and Sam Acho recovered. Chicago attempted to take advantage of the takeaway, but Cairo Santos' 54-yard field goal went wide right. A drive later, the Bears forced a three-and-out until a holding penalty on Prince Amukamara gave the Eagles a first down. Wentz later escaped a blitz from Cre'Von LeBlanc on third-and-nine to record a 16-yard run, followed by throwing a 15-yard touchdown pass to Nelson Agholor, who escaped Eddie Jackson and Kyle Fuller for the touchdown. Later in the first half, Jake Elliott made a 45-yard field goal to increase the gap, and Wentz threw an eight-yard touchdown pass to Alshon Jeffery with five seconds remaining to make the halftime score 24–0. During Chicago's first drive of the second half, Santos successfully kicked a 38-yard field goal to give the Bears three points, which followed with the defense stopping the Eagles on fourth down, but Philadelphia scored once again in the fourth quarter when Ajayi fumbled in the end zone and Agholor recovered the loose ball. Nick Foles relieved Wentz late in the game and lost a fumble to Isaiah Irving, but Corey Graham intercepted Trubisky's pass for McBride.

==== Week 13: vs. San Francisco 49ers ====
Week Thirteen: San Francisco 49ers at Chicago Bears – Game summary

Quarter	1	2	3	4	Total
**49ers**	3	6	3	3	**15**
Bears	7	7	0	0	**14**

at Soldier Field, Chicago, Illinois

- Date: December 3
- Game time: 12:00 p.m. CST
- Game weather: 54 °F (12 °C), sunny
- Game attendance: 61,302
- Referee: Ed Hochuli
- TV announcers (CBS): Andrew Catalon and James Lofton
- Recap, Gamebook

Game information

**First quarter**

- Robbie Gould 33-yard field goal, 8:16. 49ers 3-0. **Drive: 14 plays, 60 yards, 6:48**
- Dontrelle Inman 8-yard pass from Mitchell Trubisky (Cairo Santos kick), 0:16. Bears 7-3. **Drive: 7 plays, 59 yards, 4:31**

**Second quarter**

- Robbie Gould 28-yard field goal, 12:01. Bears 7-6. **Drive: 7 plays, 64 yards, 3:13.**
- Tarik Cohen 61-yard punt return (Cairo Santos kick), 6:12. Bears 14-6.
- Robbie Gould 35-yard field goal, 0:29. Bears 14-9. **Drive: 11 plays, 58 yards, 5:25.**

**Third quarter**

- Robbie Gould 34-yard field goal, 2:00. Bears 14-12. **Drive: 16 plays, 70 yards, 8:19.**

**Fourth quarter**

- Robbie Gould 24-yard field goal, 0:08. 49ers 15-14. **Drive: 14 plays, 86 yards, 5:23.**

**Top passers**

- SF – Jimmy Garoppolo - 26/37, 293 yards, INT
- CHI – Mitchell Trubisky - 12/15, 102 yards, TD

**Top rushers**

- SF – Carlos Hyde - 17 carries, 54 yards
- CHI – Jordan Howard - 13 carries, 38 yards

**Top receivers**

- SF – Marquise Goodwin - 8 receptions, 99 yards
- CHI – Tarik Cohen - 4 receptions, 39 yards

**Top tacklers**

- SF – Reuben Foster - 7 tackles
- CHI – Christian Jones - 10 tackles, 3 assists, sack

Chicago hosted the 1–10 San Francisco 49ers in week thirteen, the fourth straight year in which the two teams met and the third at Soldier Field and in December, with the Bears winning 2016's game 26–6. Offensively, the Bears rushing game had an opportune chance to succeed against a 49ers defense that was ranked 30th against the run (28th overall with 374.2 total yards allowed per game), allowing 129.5 rushing yards per game, 42 runs of at least ten yards in 2017 and three running backs to record 100-yard games. For the 49ers offense, it was led by Jimmy Garoppolo in his first start for the team, and Garoppolo was supported by a West Coast offense that ranked 12th in yards after the catch. Although the 49ers were ranked last in the league in time of possession, they were tied for the most drives of ten plays or more with 22, with 19 resulting in scores (including eight ending in touchdowns). In contrast, the Bears offense's 140 points were the fewest in the NFL, while also having a league-high 40 drives end with punts. As such, Jeff Joniak stressed the importance of playing "loose" by letting "it rip in every phase." With San Francisco's optimism in Garoppolo, the Bears had "to ruin that excitement and create some of its own."

Former Bears kicker Robbie Gould opened the game by converting a 33-yard field goal. While the Bears punted on their first drive, Kyle Fuller recorded his first interception since 2015 when he yanked the ball from Louis Murphy's hands, which set up Mitchell Trubisky's eight-yard touchdown pass to Dontrelle Inman. Gould added a 28-yard field goal in the second quarter to narrow the gap to one point, but Tarik Cohen responded with a 61-yard punt return touchdown; after catching the punt at his 39-yard line, Cohen ran back to his 24, moved to his right, then ran forward for the touchdown. With 24 seconds left in the first half, Gould kicked his third field goal (35 yards), followed by one from 34 yards in the third quarter to put the 49ers behind by two. Early in the fourth quarter, Cohen returned a punt for 67 yards to the 49ers' 16-yard line, but Ben Braunecker was penalized for an illegal block in the back to negate the play and force the Bears to start at their own 14. Although the offense was able to reach 49ers territory, it could not progress further and the Bears eventually punted. Pinned at his eight with 5:27 remaining in the game, Garoppolo led the 49ers downfield to set up Gould's game-winning 24-yard field goal with four seconds left. On the final kickoff, Josh Bellamy handed the ball to Cohen, who threw to Eddie Jackson before the play was stopped as Cohen's lateral was a forward pass.

The loss dropped the Bears to 3–9, their fourth straight losing season and worst stretch since they had five consecutive from 1996 to 2000. It was also the Bears' fifth straight loss, the first such losing streak since Marc Trestman's final season as the Bears head coach in 2014.

==== Week 14: at Cincinnati Bengals ====
Week Fourteen: Chicago Bears at Cincinnati Bengals – Game summary

Quarter	1	2	3	4	Total
**Bears**	6	6	7	14	**33**
Bengals	7	0	0	0	**7**

at Paul Brown Stadium, Cincinnati, Ohio

- Date: December 10
- Game time: 1:00 p.m. EST/12:00 p.m. CST
- Game weather: 31 °F (−1 °C), partly cloudy
- Game attendance: 52,002
- Referee: John Parry
- TV announcers (Fox): Sam Rosen, Brady Quinn and Jenny Taft
- Recap, Gamebook

Game information

**First quarter**

- CHI – Jordan Howard 21-yard run (kick failed), 11:00. Bears 6–0. **Drive: 4 plays, 51 yards, 1:06.**
- CIN – Brandon LaFell 14-yard pass from Andy Dalton (Randy Bullock kick), 2:15. Bengals 7–6. **Drive: 7 plays, 72 yards, 3:59.**

**Second quarter**

- CHI – Mike Nugent 34-yard field goal, 12:38. Bears 9–7. **Drive: 10 plays, 73 yards, 4:37.**
- CHI – Mike Nugent 27-yard field goal, 1:46. Bears 12–7. **Drive: 15 plays, 86 yards, 8:11.**

**Third quarter**

- CHI – Mitchell Trubisky 4-yard run (Mike Nugent kick), 4:54. Bears 19–7. **Drive: 9 plays, 76 yards, 5:15.**

**Fourth quarter**

- CHI – Adam Shaheen 1-yard pass from Mitchell Trubisky (Mike Nugent kick), 14:52. Bears 26–7. **Drive: 7 plays, 43 yards, 3:23.**
- CHI – Jordan Howard 8-yard run (Mike Nugent kick), 9:18. Bears 33–7. **Drive: 7 plays, 80 yards, 4:13.**

**Top passers**

- CHI – Mitchell Trubisky – 25/32, 271 yards, TD
- CIN – Andy Dalton – 14/29, 141 yards, TD, INT

**Top rushers**

- CHI – Jordan Howard – 23 carries, 147 yards, 2 TD
- CIN – Giovani Bernard – 11 carries, 62 yards

**Top receivers**

- CHI – Kendall Wright – 10 receptions, 107 yards
- CIN – Giovani Bernard – 6 receptions, 68 yards

**Top tacklers**

- CHI – Danny Trevathan - 4 tackles, 6 assists
- CIN – Jordan Evans and Clayton Fejedelem - 10 total tackles each

The Cincinnati Bengals hosted the Bears in week fourteen, holding a 6–4 lead in the series against Chicago. While the Bears won the most recent meeting in 2013 21–13, the Bengals dominated the last game in Cincinnati, a 45–10 victory in 2009. As the Bengals defense was struggling to contain opposing running attacks, allowing 170 carries of at least four yards, the most in the NFL, while the Bears had 141 of such attempts (15th in the league), Jeff Joniak wrote the Bears should effectively utilize Jordan Howard and Tarik Cohen, while also reducing the number of negative runs (with 50 entering week fourteen). On defense, the Bears had to play without players like Pernell McPhee, Leonard Floyd, Eddie Goldman, Willie Young, Mitch Unrein, Jerrell Freeman, Adrian Amos, and Quintin Demps, all of whom were sidelined due to injuries. Joniak took note of Bengals quarterback Andy Dalton's struggles under pressure, being sacked 19 times on third down in 2017, while the Bears led the league in third-down sacks with 17 sacks, including at least one sack in every game in 2017. As a result, Joniak stressed the importance of providing a heavy blitz. Joniak also added taking advantage of a Bengals special teams unit that was ranked 27th in average return yards allowed with 10.7, including four 20+-yard returns and a return touchdown. After a physical game against the Steelers in week thirteen, Joniak expressed the possibility of the Bengals being "flat", and "[i]f so, the Bears should pounce on the opportunity and prove they are still playing for pride and the future."

After the Bengals punted on their first drive, the Bears scored on their opening series for the first time in 2017, doing so on Howard's 21-yard touchdown run. However, Mike Nugent, who was signed earlier in the week to replace an injured Cairo Santos, missed the extra point as the kick hit the right upright. The Bengals responded late in the first quarter when Dalton threw a 14-yard touchdown pass to Brandon LaFell, who evaded Deon Bush for the score. Early in the second quarter, Mitchell Trubisky threw a 15-yard touchdown pass to Cohen, but it was nullified by Tom Compton's holding penalty; the Bears were eventually forced to settle for Nugent's 34-yard field goal to retake the lead. Nugent added a 27-yard field goal with 2:15 remaining in the half to give the Bears the 12–7 lead at halftime. Following punts on the first two drives of the second half, Trubisky scored on a four-yard touchdown run. On the ensuing drive, Dalton's pass to A. J. Green was deflected and intercepted by Eddie Jackson, which resulted in Trubisky's one-yard touchdown pass to Adam Shaheen. Jackson forced another takeaway when he pulled the ball away from Green's hands and recovered; Chicago once again capitalized via Howard's eight-yard touchdown run to put the Bears up 33–7. Neither team was able to score for the rest of the game.

The 26-point victory marked the largest blowout for the Bears since a 51–20 win over the Tennessee Titans in 2012. It was also Chicago's highest-scoring game since the team scored 37 against the St. Louis Rams in 2015. The Bears offense ended the game with a season-high 482 total yards, nearly 200 more than in the Bears' last two games, along with 232 rushing yards and three touchdowns on the ground. Howard recorded 167 rushing yards, resulting in a season total of 1,032, and he became the first running back in Bears history to have 1,000-yard rushing seasons in his first two years in the NFL.

==== Week 15: at Detroit Lions ====
Week Fifteen: Chicago Bears at Detroit Lions – Game summary

Quarter	1	2	3	4	Total
Bears	0	3	0	7	**10**
**Lions**	3	10	7	0	**20**

at Ford Field, Detroit, Michigan

- Date: December 16
- Game time: 4:30 p.m. EST/3:30 p.m. CST
- Game weather: Played indoors (dome stadium)
- Game attendance: 65,872
- Referee: Jeff Triplette
- TV announcers (NFLN): Mike Tirico, Kurt Warner and Heather Cox
- Recap, Gamebook

Game information

**First quarter**

- DET – Matt Prater 48-yard field goal. Lions 3–0. **Drive: 8 plays, 47 yards, 3:02.**

**Second quarter**

- DET – Matt Prater 31-yard field goal. Lions 6–0. **Drive: 11 plays, 49 yards, 5:27.**
- DET – T. J. Jones 3-yard pass from Matthew Stafford (Matt Prater kick). Lions 13–0. **Drive: 10 plays, 92 yards, 5:44.**
- CHI – Mike Nugent 41-yard field goal. Lions 13–3. **Drive: 2 plays, 4 yards, 0:10.**

**Third quarter**

- DET – Eric Ebron 8-yard pass from Matthew Stafford (Matt Prater kick). Lions 20–3. **Drive: 9 plays, 41 yards, 4:22.**

**Fourth quarter**

- CHI – Benny Cunningham 9-yard pass from Mitchell Trubisky (Mike Nugent kick). Lions 20–10. **Drive: 13 plays, 92 yards, 6:51.**

**Top passers**

- CHI – Mitchell Trubisky – 31/46, 314 yards, TD, 3 INT
- DET – Matthew Stafford – 25/33, 237 yards, 2 TD

**Top rushers**

- CHI – Jordan Howard – 10 carries, 37 yards
- DET – Theo Riddick – 8 carries, 49 yards

**Top receivers**

- CHI – Kendall Wright – 7 receptions, 81 yards
- DET – Marvin Jones Jr. – 3 receptions, 85 yards

**Top tacklers**

- CHI – Eddie Jackson – 7 tackles, 1 assist
- DET – Tahir Whitehead – 6 tackles, 3 assists

The Bears visited Ford Field to play the 7–6 Lions for the second time in 2017 in week fifteen. Jeff Joniak emphasized a consistent offensive production against Detroit, one that would be similar to the success in Cincinnati but would be difficult to maintain if the offense was to lose awareness; the Lions defense forced 12 fumbles and 26 sacks, while seven players had intercepted a pass and the unit had seven return touchdowns. In spite of the Lions' success at forcing turnovers, the defense ranked 27th in total yards allowed, 20th against the run, and 27th in pass defense. For the Bears defense, it saw the return of linebacker and leader Danny Trevathan; Joniak described his presence as a "Trevathan effect", with the defense allowing 81 points in three losses and failing to win a game when he was absent, while allowing 17.6 points per game and going 4–5 when he was playing. The defense entered the game with a fifth-ranked red zone touchdown efficiency, while also excelling in providing pressure, ranking second in sacks on third down, ninth in opposing quarterback rating when blitzed, and leading the league in fumble recoveries with 12. The unit took on a Lions offense that ranked sixth in the NFL in yards after catch with 1,759 (47.5 of the team's total yards), but was one of three teams in the league with less than 300 total rushing attempts and averaging fewer than 77 rushing yards per game. Detroit's passing attack continued to be led by Matthew Stafford, who recorded a career-best 120.2 passer rating against the Bears earlier in the season.

Matt Prater made a 48-yard field goal on the Lions' opening drive, followed by a 31-yard kick in the second quarter to put Detroit up by six. After being pinned on his team's eight-yard line, Stafford led a 92-yard drive that ended with a three-yard touchdown pass to T. J. Jones. On the ensuing kickoff, Tarik Cohen recorded a 90-yard return to the Lions' 14-yard line, but a holding penalty on DeAndre Houston-Carson nullified the play and forced the Bears to start at their own 14. Later in the quarter, Sam Acho stripped Theo Riddick and Eddie Jackson recovered. Mike Nugent made a 41-yard field goal with two seconds remaining in the half to grant the Bears' first points of the game. However, the Bears' first drive of the second half ended when Mitchell Trubisky's pass for Kendall Wright was overthrown and intercepted by Darius Slay, which set up Stafford's eight-yard touchdown pass to Eric Ebron. After a trading of punts, Trubisky guided the Bears to the Lions' five-yard line, but he was once again intercepted when his pass for Dontrelle Inman was picked off by Quandre Diggs. Unlike the previous takeaway, the Lions could not capitalize and were forced to punt. The Bears went 92 yards and eventually scored on Trubisky's nine-yard touchdown pass to Benny Cunningham to create a ten-point game, but he was intercepted for the third time on the next drive.

After recording 222 rushing yards on 30 carries in the first game against Detroit, the Bears had just 43 yards on 15 attempts in week fifteen. Chicago also committed a season-high 15 penalties for 97 yards.

==== Week 16: vs. Cleveland Browns ====
Week Sixteen: Cleveland Browns at Chicago Bears – Game summary

Quarter	1	2	3	4	Total
Browns	0	3	0	0	**3**
**Bears**	6	0	14	0	**20**

at Soldier Field, Chicago, Illinois

- Date: December 24
- Game time: 12:00 p.m. CST
- Game weather: 24 °F (−4 °C), cloudy
- Game attendance: 58,796
- Referee: Terry McAulay
- TV announcers (CBS): Tom McCarthy, Steve Beuerlein and Steve Tasker
- Recap, Gamebook

Game information

**First quarter**

- CHI – Jordan Howard 2-yard run (kick failed), 1:23. Bears 6–0. **Drive: 9 plays, 57 yards, 5:11.**

**Second quarter**

- CLE – Zane Gonzalez 48-yard field goal, 0:06. Bears 6–3. **Drive: 4 plays, 48 yards, 0:30.**

**Third quarter**

- CHI – Jordan Howard 16-yard run (Mike Nugent kick), 12:30. Bears 13–3. **Drive: 4 plays, 60 yards, 2:37.**
- CHI – Mitchell Trubisky 4-yard run (Mike Nugent kick), 3:33. Bears 20–3. **Drive: 12 plays, 66 yards, 7:30.**

**Fourth quarter**

- No scoring plays.

**Top passers**

- CLE – DeShone Kizer – 18/36, 182 yards, 2 INT
- CHI – Mitchell Trubisky – 14/23, 193 yards

**Top rushers**

- CLE – Isaiah Crowell – 12 rushes, 44 yards
- CHI – Jordan Howard – 22 rushes, 44 yards, 2 TD

**Top receivers**

- CLE – Duke Johnson – 7 receptions, 81 yards
- CHI – Benny Cunningham – 2 receptions, 62 yards

**Top tacklers**

- CLE – James Burgess - 7 tackles, 2 assists, sack
- CHI – Nick Kwiatkoski - 4 tackles, 3 assists

For the final home game of the 2017 season, the Bears hosted the winless Browns on Christmas Eve. In 15 regular season meetings, the Browns led the series 9–6, though the Bears had won the last two games. While the Browns were 0–14, head coach Hue Jackson was 2–0 in Christmas games, including recording the Browns' lone win of 2016 on the day. On offense, protecting Mitchell Trubisky from Gregg Williams' blitz-heavy defense; despite its frequency of utilizing the pass rush, the Browns ranked 29th in quarterback knockdowns with 62, while also allowing ten touchdowns on blitzes. Furthermore, the Browns defense led the league in fewest rushing yards allowed per carry on first down. For the Bears defense, it faced a Browns offense that turned the ball over 36 times, including 19 interceptions from quarterback DeShone Kizer. Entering the game, Chicago had just six interceptions in 2017, meaning Cleveland marked a prime opportunity to increase the stat. The Bears were 6.5-point favorites for the game; in three seasons under John Fox, the Bears had lost all seven games in which they were favored, including defeats to the Packers and 49ers in 2017. In spite of this, considering the Bears' opposition in week sixteen, 247Sports.com's Matt Eurich wrote it would be "satisfying for many to at least see the Bears earn a victory for the first time in three years in which it has been favored."

After the first three series ended with punts, Jordan Howard scored on a two-yard run, but Mike Nugent's extra point was blocked. Following five drives that featured three-and-outs, Kizer's pass for Josh Gordon was intercepted by Kyle Fuller, but the Bears were forced to punt. Zane Gonzalez kicked a 48-yard field goal with one second remaining in the first half to make the score 6–3 at halftime. On the first offensive play of the second half, Trubisky was intercepted by Myles Garrett, who returned the pick to the Bears' five-yard line, but the play was called back because of an offsides penalty on Carl Nassib. With the drive saved, Trubisky completed a 40-yard pass to Benny Cunningham to set the offense up in the Browns' red zone, which led to Howard's 16-yard touchdown run. Upon getting the ball back, Trubisky guided the offense downfield on a 66-yard drive that culminated in his four-yard touchdown run. A series later, Rashard Higgins caught Kizer's pass and reached the Bears' three-yard line, where he was stripped by Danny Trevathan and the ball went into the end zone, where Prince Amukamara recovered. Another takeaway for the Bears occurred with 4:11 left in the game, when Kizer's pass was intercepted by Bryce Callahan. However, neither team scored for the rest of the game as the Bears triumphed 20–3.

With the win, the Bears defeated all four AFC North teams in 2017, a similar feat accomplished in 2013. Trubisky ran for 246 yards, the most by a Bears quarterback since Kordell Stewart in 2003, along with throwing for 193 yards; the latter increased his season passing yard total to 2,015, the most by a rookie in Bears history.

==== Week 17: at Minnesota Vikings ====
Week Seventeen: Chicago Bears at Minnesota Vikings – Game summary

Quarter	1	2	3	4	Total
Bears	0	7	0	3	**10**
**Vikings**	7	9	7	0	**23**

at U.S. Bank Stadium, Minneapolis, Minnesota

- Date: December 31
- Game time: 12:00 p.m. CST
- Game weather: Played indoors (dome stadium)
- Game attendance: 66,802
- Referee: Craig Wrolstad
- TV announcers (Fox): Kevin Burkhardt, Charles Davis and Pam Oliver
- Recap, Gamebook

Game information

First quarter

- MIN – Latavius Murray 1-yard run (Kai Forbath kick), 9:07. Vikings 7–0. **Drive: 7 plays, 70 yards, 3:45.**

Second quarter

- MIN – Latavius Murray 1-yard run (Kai Forbath kick), 9:30. Vikings 14–0. **Drive: 11 plays, 71 yards, 6:08.**
- CHI – Bryce Callahan 59-yard punt return (Mike Nugent kick), 5:50. Vikings 14–7.
- MIN – Penalty on Mitchell Trubisky enforced in the end zone for a safety, 2:25. Vikings 16–7.

Third quarter

- MIN – Stefon Diggs 15-yard pass from Case Keenum (Kai Forbath kick), 0:14. Vikings 23–7. **Drive: 7 plays, 63 yards, 3:36.**

Fourth quarter

- CHI – Mike Nugent 55-yard field goal, 8:22. Vikings 23–10. **Drive: 5 plays, 11 yards, 1:31.**

Top passers

- CHI – Mitchell Trubisky – 20/36, 178 yards
- MIN – Case Keenum – 21/29, 189 yards, TD

Top rushers

- CHI – Tarik Cohen – 3 rushes, 13 yards
- MIN – Latavius Murray – 20 rushes, 111 yards, 2 TD

Top receivers

- CHI – Dontrelle Inman – 5 receptions, 94 yards
- MIN – Stefon Diggs – 6 receptions, 65 yards, TD

On New Year's Eve, Chicago played 12–3 Minnesota, who led the NFC North and would clinch the second seed in the playoffs with a win, at U.S. Bank Stadium. The Bears' 30th-ranked offense (11th in rushing and 31st in passing) faced a Vikings defense that led the league, including second-place rankings in rush and pass defense. To survive, Jeff Joniak emphasized protecting Mitchell Trubisky and utilizing the rushing attack, especially as the Vikings pass defense allowed less than 200 net passing yards in just nine games in 2017. Defensively, the Bears' eighth-ranked defense (ninth in run, eighth in pass) took on the Case Keenum-led tenth-ranked offense (eighth in rushing, 13th in passing); Joniak described Chicago's defense as having "survived an array of injuries and some powerful offenses for the most part," ranking in the top half in points allowed (fourth), sacks (sixth), first downs allowed (11th), and third downs allowed (tenth). Although the Vikings ranked third in converting third downs, Joniak wrote there was "some momentum with this defense."

The Bears punted on the opening drive, which led to Latavius Murray scoring on a one-yard touchdown run. Murray added another one-yard score in the second quarter to put the Vikings up by 14. During the early stages of the game, Bryce Callahan was penalized for pass interference, resulting in the Vikings gaining 24 and 27 yards, though he redeemed himself during the second quarter on a punt return; Tarik Cohen prepared to field a punt on one side of the field, while Callahan kneeled on the other side. Cohen acted as if he was going to field the punt, prompting the Vikings to chase him, though the punt was actually being returned by Callahan, who ran 59 yards unopposed for the touchdown. However, the Vikings added two more points when Trubisky, facing a blitz from Linval Joseph, was penalized for intentional grounding, resulting in a safety. Minnesota attempted to score again on the last play of the first half, but Kai Forbath's 55-yard field goal was wide right. The first four drives of the second half resulted in punts, which ended when Keenum threw a 16-yard touchdown pass to Stefon Diggs. Trubisky attempted to guide the offense downfield, reaching as far as the Vikings' six-yard line, but he threw four consecutive incomplete passes to turn the ball over on downs. With 8:22 left in the game, Mike Nugent converted a 55-yard field goal to make the score 23–10, and the offense once again entered the Vikings' red zone on their next series. However, despite reaching the two-yard line, the Bears suffered another turnover on downs. The Bears dropped to 5–11 and were swept by all of their divisional rivals for the first time since 1969.

== Postseason ==
One day after the loss to the Vikings, John Fox was fired. Rumors of his release were reported earlier in the 2017 season, though no official announcement was made until January 1, 2018. Fox ended his tenure in Chicago with a 14–34 record, never recording a winning streak longer than two games and finishing last in the NFC North in all three seasons. "Thank you to all the players, coaches, the city of Chicago and Bears fans everywhere, your passion for the game and this team is unmatched in the NFL," Fox stated in a team release. "Today is the tough part of our results-oriented business but I wish the Bears organization the best for years to come." One week later, Chiefs offensive coordinator Matt Nagy was hired as the 16th head coach in Bears history.

For January 28's 2018 Pro Bowl, no Bears were voted in for the third consecutive year, though Jordan Howard, Kyle Long, Tarik Cohen, and Akiem Hicks were named first, second, second, and fourth alternates for the game, respectively. Josh Sitton (two), Kyle Fuller (two), and Cohen (one) received votes for the Associated Press' All-Pro Team.

=== Standings ===
==== Division ====
NFC North
	W	L	T	PCT	DIV	CONF	PF	PA	STK
^{(2)} Minnesota Vikings	13	3	0	.813	5–1	10–2	382	252	W3
Detroit Lions	9	7	0	.563	5–1	8–4	410	376	W1
Green Bay Packers	7	9	0	.438	2–4	5–7	320	384	L3
Chicago Bears	5	11	0	.313	0–6	1–11	264	320	L1

==== Conference ====
NFC
#	Team	Division	W	L	T	PCT	DIV	CONF	SOS	SOV	STK
Division leaders
1 (Note: Philadelphia claimed the No. 1 seed over Minnesota based on winning percentage vs. common opponents. Philadelphia's cumulative record against Carolina, Chicago, the Los Angeles Rams and Washington was 5–0, compared to Minnesota's 4–1 cumulative record against the same four teams.)	Philadelphia Eagles	East	13	3	0	.813	5–1	10–2	.461	.433	L1
2	Minnesota Vikings	North	13	3	0	.813	5–1	10–2	.492	.447	W3
3 (Note: LA Rams claimed the No. 3 seed over New Orleans based on head-to-head victory.)	Los Angeles Rams	West	11	5	0	.688	4–2	7–5	.504	.460	L1
4 (Note: New Orleans clinched the NFC South division over Carolina based on head-to-head sweep.)	New Orleans Saints	South	11	5	0	.688	4–2	8–4	.535	.483	L1
Wild Cards
5	Carolina Panthers	South	11	5	0	.688	3–3	7–5	.539	.500	L1
6	Atlanta Falcons	South	10	6	0	.625	4–2	9–3	.543	.475	W1
Did not qualify for the postseason
7 (Note: Detroit finished ahead of Dallas and Seattle based on conference record, while Seattle finished ahead of Dallas based on head-to-head victory.)	Detroit Lions	North	9	7	0	.563	5–1	8–4	.496	.368	W1
8	Seattle Seahawks	West	9	7	0	.563	4–2	7–5	.492	.444	L1
9	Dallas Cowboys	East	9	7	0	.563	5–1	7–5	.496	.438	W1
10	Arizona Cardinals	West	8	8	0	.500	3–3	5–7	.488	.406	W2
11 (Note: Green Bay finished ahead of Washington based on record vs. common opponents. Green Bay's cumulative record against Dallas, Minnesota, New Orleans and Seattle was 2–3, compared to Washington's 1–4 cumulative record against the same four teams.)	Green Bay Packers	North	7	9	0	.438	2–4	5–7	.539	.357	L3
12	Washington Redskins	East	7	9	0	.438	1–5	5–7	.539	.429	L1
13	San Francisco 49ers	West	6	10	0	.375	1–5	3–9	.512	.438	W5
14 (Note: Tampa Bay finished ahead of Chicago based on head-to-head victory.)	Tampa Bay Buccaneers	South	5	11	0	.313	1–5	3–9	.555	.375	W1
15	Chicago Bears	North	5	11	0	.313	0–6	1–11	.559	.500	L1
16	New York Giants	East	3	13	0	.188	1–5	1–11	.531	.458	W1
Tiebreakers (Note: When breaking ties for three or more teams under the NFL's rules, they are first broken within divisions, then comparing only the highest-ranked remaining team from each division.)

== Staff ==
2017 Chicago Bears staff
Front office: Secretary of the board of directors – Virginia Halas McCaskey; Chairman – George McCaskey; President/CEO – Ted Phillips; General manager – Ryan Pace; Vice president & general counsel – Cliff Stein; Director of player personnel – Josh Lucas; Director of college scouting – Mark Sadowski; Director of pro personnel – Champ Kelly; Director of football administration – Joey Laine; Head coaches: Head coach – John Fox; Offensive coaches: Offensive coordinator – Dowell Loggains; Quarterbacks – Dave Ragone; Running backs – Curtis Modkins; Wide receivers – Zach Azzanni; Tight ends – Frank Smith; Offensive line – Jeremiah Washburn; Assistant offensive line – Ben Wilkerson; Offensive assistant – John Dunn; Offensive assistant – Ben McDaniels	Defensive coaches: Defensive coordinator – Vic Fangio; Defensive line – Jay Rodgers; Outside linebackers – Brandon Staley; Inside linebackers – Glenn Pires; Defensive backs – Ed Donatell; Assistant defensive backs – Roy Anderson; Defensive quality control – Sean Desai; Special teams coaches: Special teams coordinator – Jeff Rodgers; Assistant special teams – Derius Swinton II; Strength and conditioning: Strength and conditioning – Jason George; Assistant strength and conditioning – Rick Perry; Assistant strength and conditioning – Pierre Ngo

== Final roster ==
2017 Chicago Bears roster
Quarterbacks (QB): 8 Mike Glennon; 6 Mark Sanchez; 10 Mitchell Trubisky; Running backs (RB): 46 Michael Burton; 29 Tarik Cohen; 30 Benny Cunningham; 24 Jordan Howard; 33 Taquan Mizzell; Wide receivers (WR): 15 Josh Bellamy; 17 Dontrelle Inman; 12 Markus Wheaton; 13 Kendall Wright; Tight ends (TE): 84 Ben Braunecker; 85 Daniel Brown; 87 Adam Shaheen; 88 Dion Sims	Offensive linemen (OL): 76 Tom Compton G; 55 Hroniss Grasu C; 60 Brandon Greene T; 63 Cameron Lee G; 72 Charles Leno T; 70 Bobby Massie T; 71 Josh Sitton G; 79 Bradley Sowell G/T; 65 Cody Whitehair C; Defensive linemen (DL): 90 Jonathan Bullard DE; 69 Rashaad Coward DE; 91 Eddie Goldman NT; 96 Akiem Hicks DE; 73 John Jenkins NT; 95 Roy Robertson-Harris DE	Linebackers (LB): 93 Sam Acho OLB; 58 Jonathan Anderson ILB; 99 Lamarr Houston OLB; 52 Christian Jones ILB; 57 Howard Jones OLB; 44 Nick Kwiatkoski ILB; 53 John Timu ILB; 59 Danny Trevathan ILB; Defensive backs (DB): 38 Adrian Amos SS; 20 Prince Amukamara CB; 26 Deon Bush SS; 37 Bryce Callahan CB; 31 Marcus Cooper CB; 23 Kyle Fuller CB; 32 Deiondre' Hall CB; 36 DeAndre Houston-Carson FS; 39 Eddie Jackson FS; 22 Cre'Von LeBlanc CB; 27 Sherrick McManis CB; Special teams (ST): 49 Andrew DePaola LS; 16 Pat O'Donnell P; 1 Mike Nugent K	Practice squad: 62 Travis Averill C; 18 Demarcus Ayers WR; 19 Tanner Gentry WR; 35 Doran Grant CB; 74 Caushaud Lyons DE; 80 Mekale McKay WR; 68 Will Pericak G; 14 Nelson Spruce WR; 82 Colin Thompson TE; 78 D. J. Tialavea T; Reserve: 21 Quintin Demps SS (IR); 94 Leonard Floyd OLB (IR); 50 Jerrell Freeman ILB (IR); 47 Isaiah Irving OLB (IR); 64 Eric Kush C (IR); 75 Kyle Long G (IR); 92 Pernell McPhee OLB (IR); 81 Cameron Meredith WR (IR); 86 Zach Miller TE (IR); 67 Jordan Morgan G (IR); 2 Cairo Santos K (IR); 48 Patrick Scales LS (IR); 98 Mitch Unrein DE (IR); 11 Kevin White WR (IR); 97 Willie Young OLB (IR); Rookies in italics 53 active, 15 reserve, 10 practice squad
