= Cameron Lee =

American football player (born 1993)

Profile
- Position: Offensive guard

Personal information
- Born: December 28, 1993 (age 32); Danville, Illinois, U.S.
- Listed height: 6 ft 6 in (1.98 m)
- Listed weight: 313 lb (142 kg)

Career information
- High school: Oakwood (IL)
- College: Illinois State
- NFL draft: 2017: undrafted

Career history
- New Orleans Saints (2017)*; Cincinnati Bengals (2017)*; Chicago Bears (2017); Baltimore Ravens (2018)*; Arizona Hotshots (2019)*
- * Offseason or practice squad member only

Career NFL statistics
- Games played: 2
- Stats at Pro Football Reference

Cameron Lee (born December 28, 1993) is an American former professional football player who was an offensive guard for the Chicago Bears of the National Football League (NFL). He played college football for the Illinois State Redbirds and signed with the New Orleans Saints as an undrafted free agent in 2017.

== Professional career ==
=== New Orleans Saints ===
Lee signed with the New Orleans Saints as an undrafted free agent on May 1, 2017. He was waived by the team on June 16, 2017.

=== Cincinnati Bengals ===
On June 27, 2017, Lee signed with the Cincinnati Bengals. He was waived by the team on September 2, 2017.

=== Chicago Bears ===
On September 3, 2017, Lee was signed to the Chicago Bears' practice squad. He was promoted to the active roster on December 5, 2017. He appeared in two games for the Bears during the 2017 season, playing in 20 snaps on offense and five snaps on special teams. He was waived on May 14, 2018.

=== Baltimore Ravens ===
On July 21, 2018, Lee signed with the Baltimore Ravens. He was waived on September 1, 2018.

=== Arizona Hotshots ===
In 2018, Lee signed to the Arizona Hotshots for the 2019 season. He was released on January 14, 2019.
