= Jordan Morgan (American football, born 1994) =

American gridiron football player (born 1994)

No. 67, 66
- Position: Offensive guard

Personal information
- Born: May 13, 1994 (age 32); Philadelphia, Pennsylvania, U.S.
- Listed height: 6 ft 4 in (1.93 m)
- Listed weight: 311 lb (141 kg)

Career information
- High school: Parkway Northwest (Philadelphia)
- College: Kutztown (PA)
- NFL draft: 2017: 5th round, 147th overall pick

Career history
- Chicago Bears (2017); Tennessee Titans (2018)*; New York Jets (2019)*; Calgary Stampeders (2019–2020)*; DC Defenders (2020)*
- * Offseason or practice squad member only
- Stats at Pro Football Reference

Jordan Morgan (born May 13, 1994) is an American former professional football guard. He played college football at Kutztown University of Pennsylvania. Morgan was selected by the Chicago Bears in the fifth round of the 2017 NFL draft.

== College career ==
Jordan played football at Kutztown University of Pennsylvania, an NCAA Division II school. During his career, he played in 43 games and majored in leisure and sport studies.

== Professional career ==
=== Pre-draft ===
Morgan received an invitation to the NFL Combine and was able to complete all of the drills. After attending the combine, he was projected to be a fourth or fifth round pick by the majority or analysts and scouts. He was ranked the eighth best guard in the draft by Sports Illustrated and the ninth best guard by NFLDraftScout.com. On March 8, 2017, he decided to attend Temple's pro day, but was satisfied with his combine performance and only executed positional drills.

Pre-draft measurables
Height	Weight	Arm length	Hand span	40-yard dash	10-yard split	20-yard split	20-yard shuttle	Three-cone drill	Vertical jump	Broad jump	Bench press
6 ft 2 5/8 in (1.90 m)	309 lb (140 kg)	34 5/8 in (0.88 m)	10 in (0.25 m)	5.36 s	1.86 s	3.11 s	4.73 s	8.13 s	27 in (0.69 m)	8 ft 6 in (2.59 m)	21 reps
All values from 2017 NFL Combine

=== Chicago Bears ===
Morgan was selected by the Chicago Bears in the fifth round, 147th overall, in the 2017 NFL draft. On May 11, 2017, the Bears signed Morgan to a four-year, $2.69 million contract with a signing bonus of $296,038. He was placed on injured reserve on September 2, 2017.

On September 1, 2018, Morgan was waived by the Bears.

=== Tennessee Titans ===
On October 10, 2018, Morgan was signed to the practice squad of the Tennessee Titans. He was released on December 3, 2018.

=== New York Jets ===
On February 7, 2019, Morgan was signed by the New York Jets. He was waived on August 31, 2019.

=== Calgary Stampeders ===
Morgan was signed to the practice roster of the Calgary Stampeders of the Canadian Football League on September 30, 2019. He was released from the practice roster on October 26, 2019, and re-signed to the active roster for the 2020 season on November 26, 2019.

=== DC Defenders ===
Morgan signed with the DC Defenders of the XFL during training camp. He was waived during final roster cuts on January 22, 2020.
