= Deiondre' Hall =

American football player (born 1994)

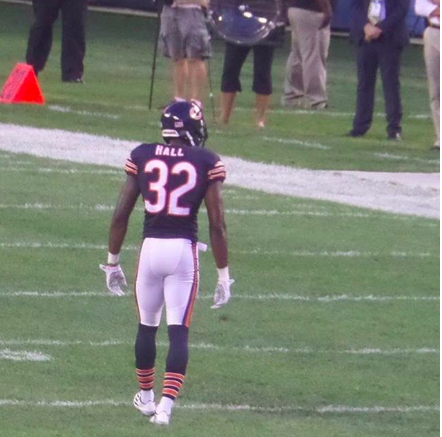
- Hall with the Chicago Bears in 2017

No. 32, 36
- Position: Safety

Personal information
- Born: May 31, 1994 (age 32); Columbia, South Carolina, U.S.
- Listed height: 6 ft 2 in (1.88 m)
- Listed weight: 206 lb (93 kg)

Career information
- High school: Blue Springs (Blue Springs, Missouri)
- College: Northern Iowa (2012–2015)
- NFL draft: 2016: 4th round, 127th overall pick

Career history
- Chicago Bears (2016–2017); Philadelphia Eagles (2018); Tampa Bay Buccaneers (2020)*; Saskatchewan Roughriders (2021)*
- * Offseason or practice squad member only

Career NFL statistics
- Total tackles: 13
- Interceptions: 1
- Stats at Pro Football Reference

Deiondre' Clifton Hall (born May 31, 1994) is an American former professional football player who was a safety in the National Football League (NFL). He played college football for the Northern Iowa Panthers from 2012 to 2015 and was selected by the Chicago Bears in the fourth round of the 2016 NFL draft.

== Early life ==
Deiondre' was born in Columbia, South Carolina to Rosie and Clifton Hall Jr. He is the older brother of twins, Texas Tech long jumper, Justin Hall and the late Jordan Hall. At age 5, Deiondre' and his family relocated to Blue Springs, Missouri.

Hall attended Blue Springs High School in Blue Springs, Missouri. He was a three sport athlete in football, basketball, and track. As a senior, Hall was a two-way starter, playing both free safety and wide receiver. Deiondre' finished his senior season with 54 tackles, 8 pass breakups, 4 interceptions and one forced fumble on defense and caught 35 passes for 719 yards and 9 touchdowns on offense. His efforts on the field earned him first-team all-state and first-team all-metro. Hall was also named to the All-Simone team, which consists of the top players in the Kansas City area.

As a basketball player, Hall averaged 10.8 points per game, 3.2 rebounds per game, and 2.5 assists per game as a starter his senior year. As a high school track athlete, Hall's personal bests included a high jump of 6 ft 9 in (2.06 m) a school record; a long jump of 23 ft 3/4 in (7.029 m); a triple jump of 47 ft 7 3/4 in (14.522 m); and a 400-meter dash of 52.20 sec.

As a senior at the MSHSAA Class 3–4 State Track Championships, Hall placed 2nd in the high jump, 4th in the long jump and 5th in the triple jump.

== College career ==
Deiondre' chose the University of Northern Iowa over offers from Southern Illinois, Illinois State, and South Dakota.

A four-year starter at the University of Northern Iowa, Hall played in 51 games over four seasons from 2012 to 2015. Hall amassed 13 interceptions (4 returned for touchdowns), 242 tackles, 16 tackles for loss, 3 forced fumbles, 3 sacks and 15 pass breakups. Hall also contributed on special teams, adding 15 kickoff returns for 313 yards (20.9 average) and 5 punt returns for 39 yards (7.8 average). He also posted 2 receptions for 45 yards (22.5 average) on offense.

Hall played in 11 games and started six in 2012. He finished the season with 29 tackles and 0.5 tackles for loss while also notching a blocked kick and one forced fumble.

As a sophomore in 2013, Hall started all 12 games for the Panthers at linebacker and cornerback. He finished the season with 57 tackles, 6.5 tackles for loss, three sacks and two interceptions (one returned for a touchdown). On special teams, he recorded 202 yards on 10 kickoff returns (20.2 average) and 13 yards on one punt return. On offense, he caught one pass for 20 yards on offense.

As a junior in 2014, Hall started in all 14 games, finishing the season leading UNI cornerbacks in tackles with 74, and 3.5 tackles for loss. Hall posted six pass break-ups which ranked him in the top 10 in the Missouri Valley Football Conference. Hall also ranked first in the conference with five interceptions (one returned for a touchdown). On special teams, he had one punt return for 19 yards and one kickoff return for 21 yards.

Hall appeared and started in all 14 games for the Panthers in 2015, stealing a career-high six interceptions (two return for touchdowns), three forced fumbles, 82 tackles, 5.5 tackles for loss and four pass break ups. He posted four kickoff returns for 90 yards (22.5 average) and three punt returns for seven yards on special teams and 1 catch for 25 yards on offense.

== Professional career ==
=== Pre-draft ===
Concluding his senior season, Hall accepted an invite and participated in the Senior Bowl as well as the NFL Scouting Combine.

Pre-draft measurables
Height	Weight	Arm length	Hand span	40-yard dash	10-yard split	20-yard split	20-yard shuttle	Three-cone drill	Vertical jump	Broad jump	Bench press
6 ft 1 5/8 in (1.87 m)	199 lb (90 kg)	34 3/8 in (0.87 m)	9 3/4 in (0.25 m)	4.68 s	1.71 s	2.78 s	4.06 s	7.07 s	37 in (0.94 m)	10 ft 7 in (3.23 m)	10 reps
All values are from NFL Combine, except bench press from Pro Day

External videos
- Hall's NFL Combine workout
- Hall gets drafted by Chicago

=== Chicago Bears ===
Hall was selected in the fourth round (127th overall) by the Chicago Bears in the 2016 NFL draft. The pick used to draft him was acquired in a trade that sent Martellus Bennett to the New England Patriots. He signed a four-year contract worth $2.8 million with a $510,982 signing bonus.

On October 2, 2016, in Week 4, Hall recorded his first career interception against the Detroit Lions.

On September 4, 2017, Hall was placed on injured reserve due to a hamstring injury suffered in a pre-season game. He was activated off injured reserve to the active roster on December 2, 2017.

Hall was suspended the first game of the 2018 season for violating the league's substance abuse policy.

=== Philadelphia Eagles ===
On September 1, 2018, Hall was traded to the Philadelphia Eagles for a 2019 seventh-round draft pick.

Hall was waived during final roster cuts on August 30, 2019.

=== Tampa Bay Buccaneers ===
On January 7, 2020, Hall signed a reserve/future contract with the Tampa Bay Buccaneers. He was waived on July 30, 2020.

=== Saskatchewan Roughriders ===
Hall signed with the Saskatchewan Roughriders of the Canadian Football League on March 9, 2021. He was released on July 30, 2021.

== Personal life ==
On March 26, 2017, Hall was arrested in Cedar Falls, Iowa following an incident where a fight took place at 1:00 A.M. outside of Sharky's Funhouse. Hall was caught yelling profanity at the bar staff and other patrons. The police removed Hall from the bar, and had to be tasered while handcuffed, after refusing to cooperate. Hall was charged with interference, public intoxication, and disorderly conduct.

Hall entered a plea on February 6, 2017, that resulted in six months of probation and $1,530 in penalties and court costs.

In June 2018, Hall was a part of a mission trip to Harmons, Jamaica, where he and a group of volunteers spent eight days helping build homes for members of the community.
