= Danny Mason =

American gridiron football player (born 1990)

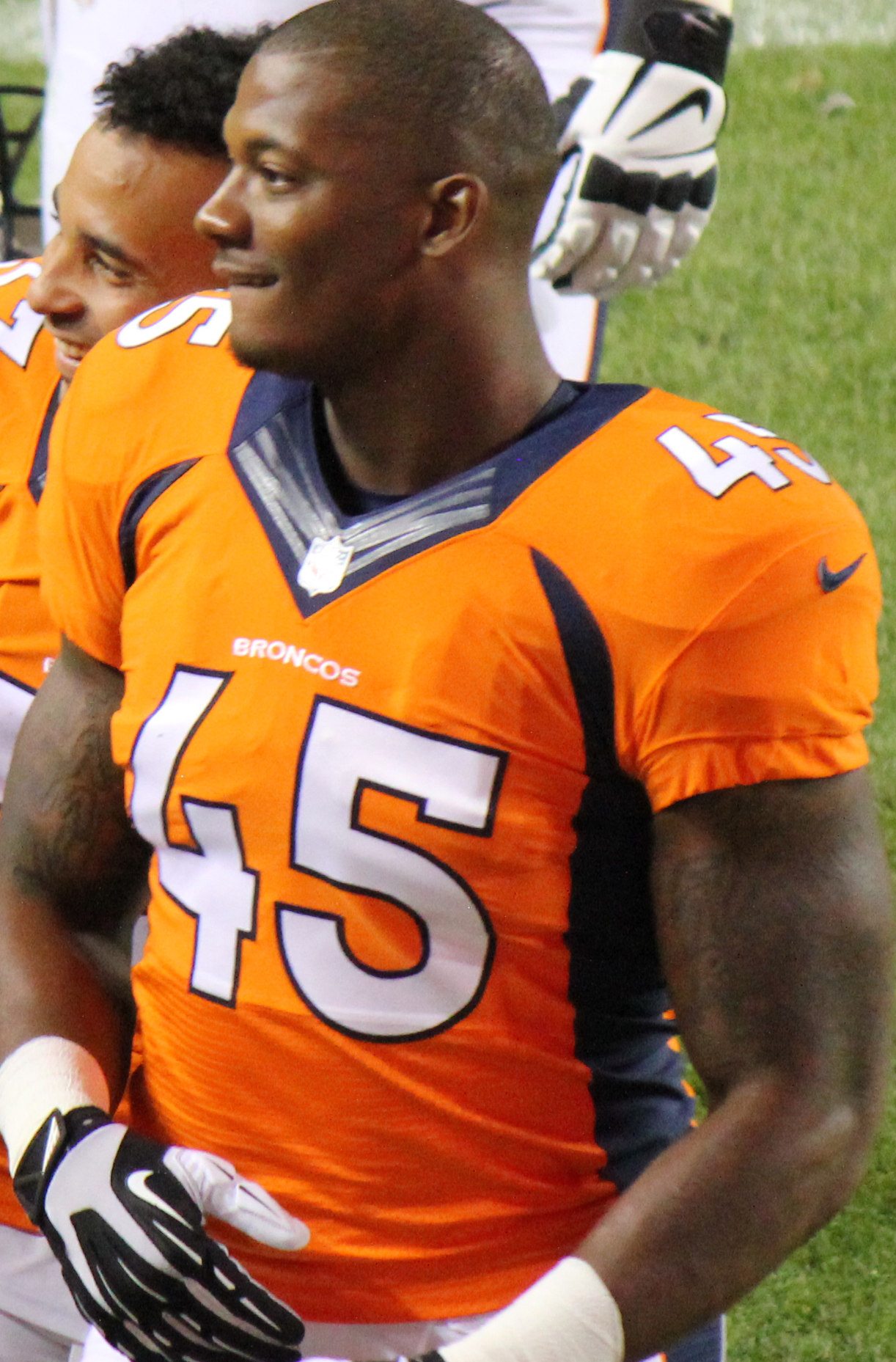
- Mason with the Denver Broncos in 2015

No. 95
- Position: Inside linebacker/Defensive line

Personal information
- Born: October 14, 1990 (age 36); Louisville, Kentucky
- Listed height: 6 ft 3 in (1.91 m)
- Listed weight: 255 lb (116 kg)

Career information
- High school: Louisville (KY) Shawnee
- College: Texas A&M–Commerce
- NFL draft: 2013: undrafted

Career history
- Texas Revolution (2014); Colorado Ice (2014); Denver Broncos (2015)*; Chicago Bears (2015–2016); Denver Broncos (2017)*; Calgary Stampeders (2017); Ottawa Redblacks (2018–2020)
- * Offseason or practice squad member only
- Stats at Pro Football Reference
- Stats at CFL.ca

Danny Mason Jr. (born October 14, 1990) is an American former professional gridiron football player who was an inside linebacker and defensive lineman. He played in the Indoor Football League for the Texas Revolution and the Colorado Ice. He played college football at Texas A&M-Commerce, where he was named an All-American. He has also been a member of the Denver Broncos, Chicago Bears, Calgary Stampeders, and Ottawa Redblacks.

== Early life ==
Mason was born in Louisville, Kentucky, and attended high school at Shawnee High School, where he was a four-year member of both the varsity basketball and football teams. He was first-team all-conference and helped lead Shawnee High to its first state playoff appearance in school history. He was selected to participate in the annual East-West High School football All Star game his senior year. Mason was recruited by former University of Kentucky Wildcat football coach Guy Morriss, who had just been hired at A&M-Commerce as head coach. Mason took a scholarship offer to join the Lions.

== College career ==
Mason was a 4-year starter for the Lions. His freshman season, the Lions went 5-5 and won the Lone Star Conference North Division with a 5–0 record. Mason made immediate impact as a true freshman. Mason was first-team all conference his Junior and Senior seasons and was named 2nd team All-American by Beyond Sports Network. His final stats as a Lion, Mason recorded 280 total tackles including 24.5 tackles for loss during his four-year Lion career. He also had 14 pass breakups and picked off three passes all of which came during the 2011 season. After Mason's eligibility was over, he stayed in Commerce and was hired by TAMUC's new head football coach Colby Carthel to be a student assistant in order to finish his degree. Mason graduated from Texas A&M-Commerce in 2013.

== Professional career ==
=== Texas Revolution and Colorado Ice ===
Mason began the 2014 season in Allen with the Texas Revolution of the Indoor Football League before traveling out to Loveland, Colorado where he played the next two months for the Colorado Ice. He led the Ice all the way to the divisional round of the playoffs before the season ended.

=== Denver Broncos ===
On January 1, 2015, Mason signed a futures contract with the Denver Broncos for the 2015 NFL season. Mason was released by the Denver Broncos on September 1, 2015. On September 6, 2015, the Denver Broncos resigned Mason to their practice squad. On September 29, 2015, Mason was released by the Denver Broncos.

=== Chicago Bears ===
On November 24, 2015, Mason was signed to the Chicago Bears' practice squad. On January 5, 2016, Mason signed a futures contract with the Chicago Bears. Mason was cut by the Bears on May 25, 2016. On August 4, 2016, Mason was re-signed by the Bears. He was waived/injured by the Bears and placed on injured reserve on September 3, 2016.

=== Denver Broncos (second stint) ===
On July 29, 2017, Mason signed with the Broncos. He was waived on September 2, 2017.

=== Ottawa Redblacks ===
Mason signed a one-year contract extension with the Ottawa Redblacks on January 11, 2021. He retired from football on June 15, 2021.
