= 2017 Minnesota Vikings season =

NFL team season

- Owner: Zygi Wilf
- General manager: Rick Spielman
- Head coach: Mike Zimmer
- Offensive coordinator: Pat Shurmur
- Defensive coordinator: George Edwards
- Home stadium: U.S. Bank Stadium

Results
- Record: 13–3
- Division place: 1st NFC North
- Playoffs: Won Divisional Playoffs (vs. Saints) 29–24; Lost NFC Championship (at Eagles) 7–38
- All-Pros: 4: CB Xavier Rhodes (1st team); FS Harrison Smith (1st team); DE Everson Griffen (2nd team); DB Xavier Rhodes (2nd team); WR Adam Thielen (2nd team)
- Pro Bowlers: 7: OLB Anthony Barr; DE Everson Griffen; DT Linval Joseph; CB Xavier Rhodes; TE Kyle Rudolph; FS Harrison Smith; WR Adam Thielen

Uniform
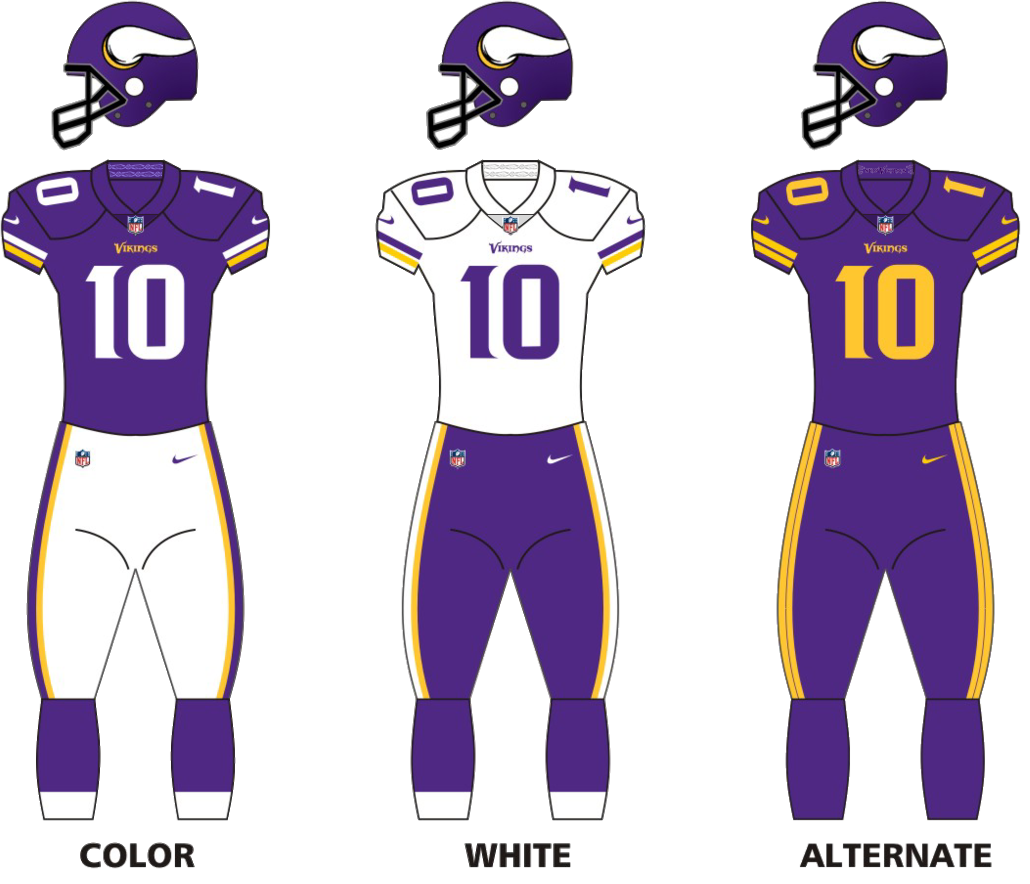

The 2017 season was the Minnesota Vikings' 57th in the National Football League (NFL), and their fourth under head coach Mike Zimmer. With the team's home stadium, U.S. Bank Stadium, scheduled to host Super Bowl LII at the end of the season, the Vikings attempted to make history as the first team to play the Super Bowl on their home field; in recording their best regular season record since 1998, they clinched a first-round bye for the first time since 2009 and became the eighth team in the Super Bowl era to qualify for the playoffs in a season in which their stadium hosted the Super Bowl. They defeated the New Orleans Saints in the divisional round 29–24 on a walk-off play referred to as the "Minneapolis Miracle", but lost 38–7 to the eventual Super Bowl champion Philadelphia Eagles in the NFC Championship Game, preventing them from becoming the first team in NFL history to play a Super Bowl in their home stadium.

This was the first season since 2006 without star running back Adrian Peterson on the roster, as the team declined his contract option in February.

== Roster changes ==
=== 2017 draft ===
Pro Bowler

2017 Minnesota Vikings draft selections
Round	Selection	Player name	Position	College	Notes
1	14	Traded to the Philadelphia Eagles (Note: The Vikings traded a first-round selection (14th overall) and a 2018 fourth-round selection to the Philadelphia Eagles in exchange for QB Sam Bradford.)			
2	41	Dalvin Cook	RB	Florida State	From Bengals (Note: The Vikings traded second- and fourth-round selections (48th and 128th overall) to the Cincinnati Bengals in exchange for a second-round selection (41st overall).)
2	48	Traded to the Cincinnati Bengals			
3	70	Pat Elflein	C	Ohio State	From Jets (Note: The Vikings traded third- and fifth-round selections (79th and 160th overall) to the New York Jets in exchange for a third-round selection (70th overall).)
3	79	Traded to the New York Jets			
3	86	Traded to the Kansas City Chiefs (Note: The Vikings traded a third-round selection (86th overall) to the Kansas City Chiefs in exchange for third-, fourth-, and seventh-round selections (104th, 132nd and 245th overall).)			From Dolphins (Note: The Vikings traded a 2016 third-round selection to the Miami Dolphins in exchange for third- and fourth-round selections (86th and 129th overall).)
3	104	Traded to the San Francisco 49ers (Note: The Vikings traded a third-round selection (104th overall) to the San Francisco 49ers in exchange for fourth- and seventh-round selections (109th and 219th overall).)			From Chiefs
4	109	Jaleel Johnson	DT	Iowa	From 49ers
4	120	Ben Gedeon	LB	Michigan	
4	128	Traded to the Cincinnati Bengals			From Dolphins
4	132	Traded to the Philadelphia Eagles (Note: The Vikings traded a fourth-round selection (132nd overall) to the Philadelphia Eagles in exchange for fourth- and seventh-round selections (139th and 230th overall).)			From Chiefs
4	139	Traded to the Kansas City Chiefs (Note: The Vikings traded a fourth-round selection (139nd overall) to the Kansas City Chiefs in exchange for two fifth-round selections (170th and 180th overall).)			From Browns via Eagles
5	160	Traded to the New York Jets			
5	170	Rodney Adams	WR	South Florida	From Chiefs
5	180	Danny Isidora	G	Miami (FL)	From Chiefs
6	199	Traded to the Washington Redskins (Note: The Vikings traded a sixth- and seventh-round selections (199th and 230th overall) to the Washington Redskins in exchange for sixth- and seventh-round selections (201st and 220th overall).)			
6	201	Bucky Hodges	TE	Virginia Tech	From Redskins
7	219	Stacy Coley	WR	Miami (FL)	From Browns via 49ers
7	220	Ifeadi Odenigbo	DE	Northwestern	From 49ers via Redskins
7	230	Traded to the Washington Redskins			From Eagles
7	232	Elijah Lee	LB	Kansas State	
7	245	Jack Tocho	CB	NC State	From Chiefs

2017 Minnesota Vikings undrafted free agents
Name	Position	College
Wes Lunt	QB	Illinois
Terrell Newby	RB	Nebraska
R. J. Shelton	WR	Michigan State
Josiah Price	TE	Michigan State
Aviante Collins	OT	TCU
Nick Fett	OT	Iowa State
Freddie Tagaloa	OT	Arizona
Tashawn Bower	DE	LSU
Caleb Kidder	DE	Montana
Sam McCaskill	DE	Boise State
Dylan Bradley	DT	Southern Miss
Eric Wilson	LB	Cincinnati
Shaan Washington	LB	Texas A&M
Horace Richardson	CB	SMU
Tommy Armstrong Jr.	S	Nebraska

Draft trades

=== Transactions ===
Re-signings
Date	Player name	Position	Contract terms
January 2, 2017	Moritz Böhringer	WR	^{[RFC]}
January 2, 2017	Kyle Carter	TE	^{[RFC]}
January 2, 2017	Cayleb Jones	WR	^{[RFC]}
January 2, 2017	Marquis Lucas	OT	^{[RFC]}
January 2, 2017	Tre Roberson	CB	^{[RFC]}
January 2, 2017	Bishop Sankey	RB	^{[RFC]}
January 2, 2017	Sterling Bailey	DT	^{[RFC]}
January 2, 2017	Austin Shepherd	OT	^{[RFC]}
January 2, 2017	Cedric Thompson	S	^{[RFC]}
March 8, 2017	Jeremiah Sirles	OT	1 year / $690,000
March 15, 2017	Terence Newman	CB	1 year / $3.25 million
March 15, 2017	Adam Thielen	WR	3 years / $17 million
March 24, 2017	Brian Robison	DE	2 years / $7.5 million

Departures
Date	Player name	Position	Note	New team
February 10, 2017	Brandon Fusco	G	Released	San Francisco 49ers
February 10, 2017	Mike Harris	G	Released	
March 6, 2017	Chad Greenway	OLB	Retired	
March 9, 2017	Rhett Ellison	TE	UFA	New York Giants
March 9, 2017	Matt Kalil	OT	UFA	Carolina Panthers
March 9, 2017	Jeff Locke	P	UFA	Indianapolis Colts
March 10, 2017	Charles Johnson	WR	UFA	Carolina Panthers
March 10, 2017	Captain Munnerlyn	CB	UFA	Carolina Panthers
March 11, 2017	Audie Cole	LB	UFA	Jacksonville Jaguars
March 13, 2017	Cordarrelle Patterson	WR/KR	UFA	Oakland Raiders
March 14, 2017	Andre Smith	OT	UFA	Cincinnati Bengals
March 24, 2017	Scott Crichton	DT	Released	
May 4, 2017	Marquis Lucas	OT	Waived	
May 4, 2017	Sterling Bailey	DE	Waived	
May 4, 2017	Cedric Thompson	S	Waived	
May 16, 2017	B. J. Dubose	DT	Waived	
May 17, 2017	Toby Johnson	DT	Waived	
May 27, 2017	Matt Asiata	RB	UFA	Detroit Lions
May 31, 2017	Mitch Mathews	WR	Waived	

Additions
Date	Player name	Position	Previous team	Contract terms
January 3, 2017	Reid Fragel	OT	Kansas City Chiefs	^{[RFC]}
January 3, 2017	Marshall Koehn	K	Miami Dolphins	^{[RFC]}
January 3, 2017	Taylor Symmank	P		^{[RFC]}
March 9, 2017	Riley Reiff	OT	Detroit Lions	5 years / $58.75 million
March 10, 2017	Mike Remmers	OT	Carolina Panthers	5 years / $30 million
March 14, 2017	Datone Jones	DE	Green Bay Packers	1 year / $3.75 million
March 16, 2017	Latavius Murray	RB	Oakland Raiders	3 years / $15.0 million
March 30, 2017	Terrell Sinkfield	CB	BC Lions (CFL)	
March 30, 2017	Mitch Mathews	WR	Cleveland Browns	
March 30, 2017	Nick Truesdell	TE	Cleveland Gladiators (AFL)	
March 31, 2017	Case Keenum	QB	Los Angeles Rams	1 year / $2.0 million
April 3, 2017	Ryan Quigley	P	Arizona Cardinals	1 year / $2.0 million
May 10, 2017	Michael Floyd	WR	New England Patriots	1 year / $1.5 million
May 17, 2017	Will Sutton	DT	Chicago Bears	

^{^[RFC]} Denotes this is a reserve/future contract.

== Staff ==
2017 Minnesota Vikings staff
Front office: Owner/chairman – Zygi Wilf; Owner/president – Mark Wilf; Owner/vice chairman – Leonard Wilf; General manager – Rick Spielman; Executive vice president – Football Operations – Rob Brzezinski; Chief operating officer – Kevin Warren; Assistant general manager – George Paton; Director of college scouting – Jamaal Stephenson; Director of pro scouting – Ryan Monnens; Head coaches: Head coach – Mike Zimmer; Offensive coaches: Offensive coordinator – Pat Shurmur; Quarterbacks – Kevin Stefanski; Running backs – Kennedy Polamalu; Wide receivers – Darrell Hazell; Assistant wide receivers – Drew Petzing; Tight ends – Clancy Barone; Offensive line – Tony Sparano; Assistant offensive line – Andrew Janocko	Defensive coaches: Defensive coordinator – George Edwards; Defensive line – Andre Patterson; Assistant defensive line – Robert Rodriguez; Linebackers – Adam Zimmer; Defensive backs – Jerry Gray; Defensive quality control/assistant defensive backs – Jonathan Gannon; Defensive assistant – Jeff Howard; Special teams coaches: Special teams coordinator – Mike Priefer; Assistant special teams – Ryan Ficken; Strength and conditioning: Head athletic trainer – Eric Sugarman; Head strength and conditioning – Mark Uyeyama; Assistant strength and conditioning – Derik Keyes; Assistant strength and conditioning – Reshard Langford; Assistant strength and conditioning – Chaz Mahle

== Roster ==
2017 Minnesota Vikings roster
Quarterbacks (QB): 5 Teddy Bridgewater; 7 Case Keenum; 1 Kyle Sloter; Running backs (RB): 31 Mack Brown; 30 C. J. Ham FB; 21 Jerick McKinnon; 25 Latavius Murray; Wide receivers (WR): 13 Stacy Coley; 14 Stefon Diggs; 18 Michael Floyd; 19 Adam Thielen; 11 Laquon Treadwell; 17 Jarius Wright; Tight ends (TE): 86 Kyle Carter; 89 David Morgan; 82 Kyle Rudolph	Offensive linemen (OL): 61 Joe Berger G/C; 76 Aviante Collins T; 67 Cornelius Edison C; 65 Pat Elflein C; 69 Rashod Hill T; 63 Danny Isidora G; 71 Riley Reiff T; 74 Mike Remmers T/G; 75 Jeremiah Sirles G; Defensive linemen (DL): 90 Tashawn Bower DE; 97 Everson Griffen DE; 99 Danielle Hunter DE; 94 Jaleel Johnson DT; 92 Tom Johnson DT; 98 Linval Joseph DT; 96 Brian Robison DE; 93 Shamar Stephen DT; 91 Stephen Weatherly DE	Linebackers (LB): 55 Anthony Barr OLB; 40 Kentrell Brothers MLB; 42 Ben Gedeon OLB; 54 Eric Kendricks MLB; 59 Emmanuel Lamur OLB; 50 Eric Wilson OLB; Defensive backs (DB): 20 Mackensie Alexander CB; 24 Tramaine Brock CB; 41 Anthony Harris SS; 27 Jayron Kearse FS; 23 Terence Newman CB; 29 Xavier Rhodes CB; 34 Andrew Sendejo SS; 35 Marcus Sherels CB; 22 Harrison Smith FS; 26 Trae Waynes CB; Special teams (ST): 2 Kai Forbath K; 44 Jeff Overbaugh LS; 4 Ryan Quigley P	Practice squad: 12 Rodney Adams WR; 79 Dylan Bradley DT; 16 Cayleb Jones WR; 68 Cedrick Lang T; 72 Storm Norton T; 95 Ifeadi Odenigbo DE; 38 Horace Richardson CB; 39 Jack Tocho SS; 56 Antwione Williams OLB; Reserve: 81 Blake Bell TE (IR); 8 Sam Bradford QB (IR); 33 Dalvin Cook RB (IR); 62 Nick Easton G/C (IR); 73 Sharrif Floyd DT (NF-Inj.); 47 Kevin McDermott LS (IR); 43 Bishop Sankey RB (IR); 57 Shaan Washington OLB (IR); Rookies in italics 53 active, 8 reserve, 9 practice squad

== Preseason ==
=== Schedule ===
The Vikings' preliminary preseason schedule was announced on April 10.

Week	Date	Opponent	Result	Record	Venue	Attendance	NFL.com recap
1	August 10	at Buffalo Bills	W 17–10	1–0	New Era Field	60,459	Recap
2	August 18	at Seattle Seahawks	L 13–20	1–1	CenturyLink Field	68,550	Recap
3	August 27	San Francisco 49ers	W 32–31	2–1	U.S. Bank Stadium	66,551	Recap
4	August 31	Miami Dolphins	L 9–30	2–2	U.S. Bank Stadium	66,409	Recap

=== Game summaries ===
==== Week 1: at Buffalo Bills ====
Week 1: Minnesota Vikings at Buffalo Bills – Game summary

Quarter	1	2	3	4	Total
Vikings	0	3	14	0	17
Bills	0	3	0	7	10

at New Era Field, Orchard Park, New York

- Date: August 10
- Game time: 7:00 p.m. EDT/6:00 p.m. CDT
- Game weather: Partly cloudy, 82 °F (28 °C)
- Game attendance: 60,459
- Referee: Terry McAulay (77)
- TV: Fox-9
- Recap, Game Book

Game information

First quarter

- No scoring plays.

Second quarter

- BUF – Steven Hauschka 42-yard field goal, 14:15. Bills 3–0. Drive: 7 plays, 37 yards, 2:46.
- MIN – Kai Forbath 36-yard field goal, 3:26. Tied 3–3. Drive: 11 plays, 60 yards, 5:47.

Third quarter

- MIN – C. J. Ham 2-yard run (Marshall Koehn kick), 10:34. Vikings 10–3. Drive: 7 plays, 69 yards, 3:26.
- MIN – Rodney Adams 2-yard pass from Taylor Heinicke (Kai Forbath kick), 1:09. Vikings 17–3. Drive: 14 plays, 71 yards, 7:28.

Fourth quarter

- BUF – Dezmin Lewis 1-yard pass from Nathan Peterman (Austin Rehkow kick), 10:08. Vikings 17–10. Drive: 13 plays, 79 yards, 6:01.

Top passers

- MIN – Case Keenum – 11/16, 121 yards
- BUF – Nathan Peterman – 13/25, 112 yards, TD

Top rushers

- MIN – Terrell Newby – 12 rushes, 26 yards
- BUF – Jonathan Williams – 4 rushes, 39 yards

Top receivers

- MIN – Stacy Coley – 3 receptions, 67 yards
- BUF – Sammy Watkins – 4 receptions, 39 yards

==== Week 2: at Seattle Seahawks ====
Week 2: Minnesota Vikings at Seattle Seahawks – Game summary

Quarter	1	2	3	4	Total
Vikings	3	3	0	7	13
Seahawks	7	7	6	0	20

at CenturyLink Field, Seattle, Washington

- Date: August 18
- Game time: 9:00 p.m. CDT/7:00 p.m. PDT
- Game weather: Sunny, 73 °F (23 °C)
- Game attendance: 68,550
- Referee: Tony Corrente (99)
- TV: Fox-9
- Recap, Game Book

Game information

First quarter

- SEA – Kasen Williams 1-yard pass from Russell Wilson (Blair Walsh kick), 9:36. Seahawks 7–0. Drive: 11 plays, 77 yards, 5:24.
- MIN – Marshall Koehn 29-yard field goal, 3:07. Seahawks 7–3. Drive: 11 plays, 76 yards, 6:29.

Second quarter

- SEA – Mike Davis 22-yard pass from Russell Wilson (Blair Walsh kick), 1:57. Seahawks 14–3. Drive: 9 plays, 80 yards, 4:07.
- MIN – Kai Forbath 51-yard field goal, 0:09. Seahawks 14–6. Drive: 10 plays, 41 yards, 1:48.

Third quarter

- SEA – Blair Walsh 52-yard field goal, 13:51. Seahawks 17–6. Drive: 4 plays, −16 yards, 1:03.
- SEA – Blair Walsh 52-yard field goal, 5:15. Seahawks 20–6. Drive: 9 plays, 64 yards, 4:29.

Fourth quarter

- MIN – Bucky Hodges 21-yard pass from Taylor Heinicke (Marshall Koehn kick), 2:49. Seahawks 20–13. Drive: 6 plays, 81 yards, 1:25.

Top passers

- MIN – Sam Bradford – 7/11, 95 yards
- SEA – Russell Wilson – 13/18, 206 yards, 2 TD

Top rushers

- MIN – Dalvin Cook – 7 rushes, 40 yards
- SEA – Alex Collins – 10 rushes, 58 yards

Top receivers

- MIN – Stefon Diggs – 4 receptions, 65 yards
- SEA – Doug Baldwin – 4 receptions, 69 yards

==== Week 3: vs. San Francisco 49ers ====
Week 3: San Francisco 49ers at Minnesota Vikings – Game summary

Quarter	1	2	3	4	Total
49ers	7	7	10	7	31
Vikings	0	0	17	15	32

at U.S. Bank Stadium, Minneapolis, Minnesota

- Date: August 27
- Game time: 7:00 p.m. CDT
- Game weather: None (indoor stadium)
- Game attendance: 66,551
- Referee: Ronald Torbert (62)
- TV: NBC
- Recap, Game Book

Game information

First quarter

- SF – Marquise Goodwin 46-yard pass from Brian Hoyer (Robbie Gould kick), 10:30. 49ers 7–0. Drive: 5 plays, 79 yards, 2:29.

Second quarter

- SF – Carlos Hyde 24-yard pass from Brian Hoyer (Robbie Gould kick), 14:55. 49ers 14–0. Drive: 10 plays, 88 yards, 5:31.

Third quarter

- MIN – Marshall Koehn 58-yard field goal, 10:59. 49ers 14–3. Drive: 6 plays, 27 yards, 1:53.
- SF – Nick Rose 55-yard field goal, 5:32. 49ers 17–3. Drive: 8 plays, 26 yards, 3:07.
- MIN – Rodney Adams 9-yard pass from Case Keenum (Marshall Koehn kick), 1:43. 49ers 17–10. Drive: 7 plays, 75 yards, 3:49.
- SF – Raheem Mostert 87-yard pass from C. J. Beathard (Nick Rose kick), 0:49. 49ers 24–10. Drive: 4 plays, 75 yards, 0:54.
- MIN – Jerick McKinnon 108-yard kickoff return (Marshall Koehn kick), 0:37. 49ers 24–17. Drive: 0 plays, 0 yards, 0:12.

Fourth quarter

- SF – Raheem Mostert 4-yard run (Robbie Gould kick), 7:48. 49ers 31–17. Drive: 13 plays, 75 yards, 7:49.
- MIN – Kyle Carter 16-yard pass from Case Keenum (Marshall Koehn kick), 6:09. 49ers 31–24. Drive: 6 plays, 75 yards, 1:39.
- MIN – Terrell Newby 1-yard run (Taylor Heinicke run), 0:00. Vikings 32–31. Drive: 14 plays, 63 yards, 2:44.

Top passers

- SF – Brian Hoyer – 12/17, 176 yards, 2 TD
- MIN – Case Keenum – 10/14, 139 yards, 2 TD

Top rushers

- SF – Matt Breida – 7 rushes, 29 yards
- MIN – Jerick McKinnon – 7 rushes, 27 yards

Top receivers

- SF – Raheem Mostert – 2 receptions, 104 yards, TD
- MIN – Stacy Coley – 4 receptions, 76 yards

==== Week 4: vs. Miami Dolphins ====
Week 4: Miami Dolphins at Minnesota Vikings – Game summary

Quarter	1	2	3	4	Total
Dolphins	7	16	0	7	30
Vikings	0	6	0	3	9

at U.S. Bank Stadium, Minneapolis, Minnesota

- Date: August 31
- Game time: 7:00 p.m. CDT
- Game weather: None (indoor stadium)
- Game attendance: 66,409
- Referee: Pete Morelli (135)
- TV: Fox-9
- Recap, Game Book

Game information

First quarter

- MIA – Kenyan Drake 1-yard run (Andrew Franks kick), 11:07. Dolphins 7–0. Drive: 10 plays, 78 yards, 3:53.

Second quarter

- MIA – Jakeem Grant 65-yard pass from David Fales (Andrew Franks kick), 12:17. Dolphins 14–0. Drive: 4 plays, 77 yards, 1:30.
- MIN – Cayleb Jones 8-yard pass from Taylor Heinicke (kick failed, wide left), 7:38. Dolphins 14–6. Drive: 9 plays, 75 yards, 4:39.
- MIA – MarQueis Gray 6-yard pass from David Fales (Andrew Franks kick), 0:24. Dolphins 21–6. Drive: 10 plays, 80 yards, 1:29.
- MIA – Taylor Heinicke sacked in the end zone by Praise Martin-Oguike for a safety, 0:12. Dolphins 23–6.

Third quarter

- No scoring plays.

Fourth quarter

- MIN – Kai Forbath 24-yard field goal, 14:53. Dolphins 23–9. Drive: 15 plays, 58 yards, 8:37.
- MIA – Mitch Mathews 19-yard pass from David Fales (Andrew Franks kick), 11:51. Dolphins 30–9. Drive: 8 plays, 70 yards, 3:02.

Top passers

- MIA – David Fales – 12/20, 193 yards, 3 TD
- MIN – Mitch Leidner – 14/19, 129 yards

Top rushers

- MIA – Kenyan Drake – 8 rushes, 27 yards, TD
- MIN – Bronson Hill – 13 rushes, 35 yards

Top receivers

- MIA – Jakeem Grant – 4 receptions, 141 yards, TD
- MIN – Cayleb Jones – 9 receptions, 127 yards, TD

== Regular season ==
=== Schedule ===
Week	Date	Opponent	Result	Record	Venue	Attendance	NFL.com recap
1	September 11	New Orleans Saints	**W** 29–19	1–0	U.S. Bank Stadium	66,606	Recap
2	September 17	at Pittsburgh Steelers	**L** 9–26	1–1	Heinz Field	65,971	Recap
3	September 24	Tampa Bay Buccaneers	**W** 34–17	2–1	U.S. Bank Stadium	66,390	Recap
4	October 1	**Detroit Lions**	**L** 7–14	2–2	U.S. Bank Stadium	66,730	Recap
5	October 9	at **Chicago Bears**	**W** 20–17	3–2	Soldier Field	61,834	Recap
6	October 15	**Green Bay Packers**	**W** 23–10	4–2	U.S. Bank Stadium	66,848	Recap
7	October 22	Baltimore Ravens	**W** 24–16	5–2	U.S. Bank Stadium	66,751	Recap
8	October 29	at Cleveland Browns	**W** 33–16	6–2	Twickenham Stadium (London, England)	74,237	Recap
9	Bye						
10	November 12	at Washington Redskins	**W** 38–30	7–2	FedExField	74,476	Recap
11	November 19	Los Angeles Rams	**W** 24–7	8–2	U.S. Bank Stadium	66,809	Recap
12	November 23	at **Detroit Lions**	**W** 30–23	9–2	Ford Field	66,613	Recap
13	December 3	at Atlanta Falcons	**W** 14–9	10–2	Mercedes-Benz Stadium	71,185	Recap
14	December 10	at Carolina Panthers	**L** 24–31	10–3	Bank of America Stadium	73,728	Recap
15	December 17	Cincinnati Bengals	**W** 34–7	11–3	U.S. Bank Stadium	66,833	Recap
16	December 23	at **Green Bay Packers**	**W** 16–0	12–3	Lambeau Field	78,092	Recap
17	December 31	**Chicago Bears**	**W** 23–10	13–3	U.S. Bank Stadium	66,802	Recap

Note: Intra-division opponents are in bold text.

=== Game summaries ===
==== Week 1: vs. New Orleans Saints ====
Week 1: New Orleans Saints at Minnesota Vikings – Game summary

Quarter	1	2	3	4	Total
Saints	3	3	3	10	**19**
**Vikings**	3	13	3	10	**29**

at U.S. Bank Stadium, Minneapolis, Minnesota

- Date: September 11
- Game time: 6:10 p.m. CDT
- Game weather: None (indoor stadium)
- Game attendance: 66,606
- Referee: Gene Steratore (114)
- TV announcers (ESPN): Sean McDonough, Jon Gruden and Lisa Salters
- Recap, Game Book

Game information

**First quarter**

- NO – Wil Lutz 43-yard field goal, 8:21. Saints 3–0. **Drive: 13 plays, 56 yards, 6:39.**
- MIN – Kai Forbath 24-yard field goal, 1:01. Tied 3–3. **Drive: 14 plays, 78 yards, 7:20.**

**Second quarter**

- NO – Wil Lutz 21-yard field goal, 5:26. Saints 6–3. **Drive: 13 plays, 74 yards, 6:49.**
- MIN – Stefon Diggs 18-yard pass from Sam Bradford (Kai Forbath kick), 4:08. Vikings 10–6. **Drive: 3 plays, 74 yards, 1:18.**
- MIN – Stefon Diggs 2-yard pass from Sam Bradford (kick failed, wide right), 0:03. Vikings 16–6. **Drive: 10 plays, 95 yards, 1:40.**

**Third quarter**

- MIN – Kai Forbath 32-yard field goal, 11:07. Vikings 19–6. **Drive: 8 plays, 54 yards, 3:53.**
- NO – Wil Lutz 24-yard field goal, 2:43. Vikings 19–9. **Drive: 8 plays, 83 yards, 2:46.**

**Fourth quarter**

- MIN – Kyle Rudolph 15-yard pass from Sam Bradford (Kai Forbath kick), 12:52. Vikings 26–9. **Drive: 9 plays, 89 yards, 4:51.**
- NO – Wil Lutz 20-yard field goal, 7:49. Vikings 26–12. **Drive: 12 plays, 73 yards, 5:03.**
- MIN – Kai Forbath 45-yard field goal, 4:00. Vikings 29–12. **Drive: 8 plays, 48 yards, 3:49.**
- NO – Coby Fleener 8-yard pass from Drew Brees (Wil Lutz kick), 1:56. Vikings 29–19. **Drive: 8 plays, 75 yards, 2:04.**

**Top passers**

- NO – Drew Brees – 27/37, 291 yards, TD
- MIN – Sam Bradford – 27/32, 346 yards, 3 TD

**Top rushers**

- NO – Adrian Peterson – 6 rushes, 18 yards
- MIN – Dalvin Cook – 22 rushes, 127 yards

**Top receivers**

- NO – Coby Fleener – 5 receptions, 54 yards, TD
- MIN – Adam Thielen – 9 receptions, 157 yards

==== Week 2: at Pittsburgh Steelers ====
Week 2: Minnesota Vikings at Pittsburgh Steelers – Game summary

Quarter	1	2	3	4	Total
Vikings	0	3	6	0	**9**
**Steelers**	7	7	6	6	**26**

at Heinz Field, Pittsburgh, Pennsylvania

- Date: September 17
- Game time: 1:00 p.m. EDT/12:00 p.m. CDT
- Game weather: Sunny, 78 °F (26 °C)
- Game attendance: 65,971
- Referee: Pete Morelli (135)
- TV announcers (Fox): Kenny Albert, Ronde Barber and Kristina Pink
- Recap, Game Book

Game information

**First quarter**

- PIT – Martavis Bryant 27-yard pass from Ben Roethlisberger (Chris Boswell kick), 3:02. Steelers 7–0. **Drive: 9 plays, 78 yards, 5:43.**

**Second quarter**

- PIT – JuJu Smith-Schuster 4-yard pass from Ben Roethlisberger (Chris Boswell kick), 13:31. Steelers 14–0. **Drive: 5 plays, 60 yards, 3:12.**
- MIN – Kai Forbath 42-yard field goal, 8:50. Steelers 14–3. **Drive: 11 plays, 51 yards, 4:41.**

**Third quarter**

- PIT – Chris Boswell 46-yard field goal, 12:19. Steelers 17–3. **Drive: 4 plays, 8 yards, 2:06.**
- MIN – C. J. Ham 1-yard run (kick failed, wide left), 9:57. Steelers 17–9. **Drive: 6 plays, 82 yards, 2:22.**
- PIT – Chris Boswell 29-yard field goal, 5:05. Steelers 20–9. **Drive: 10 plays, 74 yards, 4:52.**

**Fourth quarter**

- PIT – Chris Boswell 37-yard field goal, 3:18. Steelers 23–9. **Drive: 11 plays, 64 yards, 4:44.**
- PIT – Chris Boswell 43-yard field goal, 1:53. Steelers 26–9. **Drive: 4 plays, 5 yards, 0:20.**

**Top passers**

- MIN – Case Keenum – 20/37, 167 yards
- PIT – Ben Roethlisberger – 23/35, 243 yards, 2 TD

**Top rushers**

- MIN – Dalvin Cook – 12 rushes, 64 yards
- PIT – Le'Veon Bell – 27 rushes, 87 yards

**Top receivers**

- MIN – Kyle Rudolph – 4 receptions, 45 yards
- PIT – Martavis Bryant – 3 receptions, 91 yards, TD

==== Week 3: vs. Tampa Bay Buccaneers ====
Week 3: Tampa Bay Buccaneers at Minnesota Vikings – Game summary

Quarter	1	2	3	4	Total
Buccaneers	3	0	14	0	**17**
**Vikings**	7	14	10	3	**34**

at U.S. Bank Stadium, Minneapolis, Minnesota

- Date: September 24
- Game time: 12:00 p.m. CDT
- Game weather: None (indoor stadium)
- Game attendance: 66,390
- Referee: John Hussey (35)
- TV announcers (Fox): Thom Brennaman, Chris Spielman and Peter Schrager
- Recap, Game Book

Game information

**First quarter**

- MIN – Dalvin Cook 1-yard run (Kai Forbath kick), 10:58. Vikings 7–0. **Drive: 7 plays, 75 yards, 4:02.**
- TB – Nick Folk 40-yard field goal, 6:18. Vikings 7–3. **Drive: 8 plays, 53 yards, 4:40.**

**Second quarter**

- MIN – Jarius Wright 2-yard pass from Case Keenum (Kai Forbath kick), 10:25. Vikings 14–3. **Drive: 13 plays, 76 yards, 5:57.**
- MIN – Stefon Diggs 17-yard pass from Case Keenum (Kai Forbath kick), 0:47. Vikings 21–3. **Drive: 6 plays, 92 yards, 3:04.**

**Third quarter**

- MIN – Stefon Diggs 59-yard pass from Case Keenum (Kai Forbath kick), 12:25. Vikings 28–3. **Drive: 3 plays, 66 yards, 1:03.**
- TB – Cameron Brate 15-yard pass from Jameis Winston (Nick Folk kick), 8:47. Vikings 28–10. **Drive: 6 plays, 46 yards, 3:38.**
- MIN – Kai Forbath 20-yard field goal, 2:24. Vikings 31–10. **Drive: 13 plays, 73 yards, 6:23.**
- TB – DeSean Jackson 25-yard pass from Jameis Winston (Nick Folk kick), 0:00. Vikings 31–17. **Drive: 7 plays, 75 yards, 2:24.**

**Fourth quarter**

- MIN – Kai Forbath 37-yard field goal, 8:40. Vikings 34–17. **Drive: 6 plays, 16 yards, 3:45.**

**Top passers**

- TB – Jameis Winston – 28/40, 328 yards, 2 TD, 3 INT
- MIN – Case Keenum – 25/33, 369 yards, 3 TD

**Top rushers**

- TB – Jacquizz Rodgers – 5 rushes, 15 yards
- MIN – Dalvin Cook – 27 rushes, 97 yards, TD

**Top receivers**

- TB – DeSean Jackson – 4 receptions, 84 yards, TD
- MIN – Stefon Diggs – 8 receptions, 173 yards, 2 TD

==== Week 4: vs. Detroit Lions ====
Week 4: Detroit Lions at Minnesota Vikings – Game summary

Quarter	1	2	3	4	Total
**Lions**	0	3	11	0	**14**
Vikings	0	7	0	0	**7**

at U.S. Bank Stadium, Minneapolis, Minnesota

- Date: October 1
- Game time: 12:00 p.m. CDT
- Game weather: None (indoor stadium)
- Game attendance: 66,730
- Referee: Bill Vinovich (52)
- TV announcers (Fox): Thom Brennaman, Chris Spielman and Peter Schrager
- Recap, Game Book

Game information

**First quarter**

- No scoring plays.

**Second quarter**

- DET – Matt Prater 29-yard field goal, 10:47. Lions 3–0. **Drive: 15 plays, 82 yards, 8:02.**
- MIN – Dalvin Cook 5-yard run (Kai Forbath kick), 1:07. Vikings 7–3. **Drive: 11 plays, 81 yards, 4:33.**

**Third quarter**

- DET – Matt Prater 37-yard field goal, 10:41. Vikings 7–6. **Drive: 8 plays, 29 yards, 3:37.**
- DET – Ameer Abdullah 3-yard run (Matthew Stafford–T. J. Jones pass), 8:00. Lions 14–7. **Drive: 5 plays, 29 yards, 2:25.**

**Fourth quarter**

- No scoring plays.

**Top passers**

- DET – Matthew Stafford – 19/31, 209 yards
- MIN – Case Keenum – 16/30, 219 yards

**Top rushers**

- DET – Ameer Abdullah – 20 rushes, 94 yards, TD
- MIN – Dalvin Cook – 13 rushes, 66 yards, TD

**Top receivers**

- DET – Marvin Jones – 2 receptions, 42 yards
- MIN – Stefon Diggs – 5 receptions, 98 yards

==== Week 5: at Chicago Bears ====
Week 5: Minnesota Vikings at Chicago Bears – Game summary

Quarter	1	2	3	4	Total
**Vikings**	0	3	14	3	**20**
Bears	2	0	7	8	**17**

at Soldier Field, Chicago, Illinois

- Date: October 9
- Game time: 7:30 p.m. CDT
- Game weather: Partly cloudy, 70 °F (21 °C)
- Game attendance: 61,834
- Referee: Jerome Boger (23)
- TV announcers (ESPN): Sean McDonough, Jon Gruden and Lisa Salters
- Recap, Game Book

Game information

**First quarter**

- CHI – Sam Bradford sacked in the end zone by Leonard Floyd for a safety, 1:31. Bears 2–0.

**Second quarter**

- MIN – Kai Forbath 26-yard field goal, 1:02. Vikings 3–2. **Drive: 4 plays, 5 yards, 1:26.**

**Third quarter**

- MIN – Kyle Rudolph 13-yard pass from Case Keenum (Kai Forbath kick), 8:16. Vikings 10–2. **Drive: 13 plays, 75 yards, 6:44.**
- CHI – Benny Cunningham 38-yard pass from Pat O'Donnell (Connor Barth kick), 5:23. Vikings 10–9. **Drive: 7 plays, 75 yards, 2:53.**
- MIN – Jerick McKinnon 58-yard run (Kai Forbath kick), 3:31. Vikings 17–9. **Drive: 5 plays, 82 yards, 1:52.**

**Fourth quarter**

- CHI – Zach Miller 20-yard pass from Mitchell Trubisky (Mitchell Trubisky run), 12:24. Tied 17–17. **Drive: 11 plays, 79 yards, 6:07.**
- MIN – Kai Forbath 26-yard field goal, 0:12. Vikings 20–17. **Drive: 6 plays, 20 yards, 2:08.**

**Top passers**

- MIN – Case Keenum – 17/21, 140 yards, TD
- CHI – Mitchell Trubisky – 12/25, 128 yards, TD, INT

**Top rushers**

- MIN – Jerick McKinnon – 16 rushes, 95 yards, TD
- CHI – Jordan Howard – 19 rushes, 76 yards

**Top receivers**

- MIN – Jerick McKinnon – 6 receptions, 51 yards
- CHI – Kendall Wright – 4 receptions, 46 yards

==== Week 6: vs. Green Bay Packers ====
Week 6: Green Bay Packers at Minnesota Vikings – Game summary

Quarter	1	2	3	4	Total
Packers	0	10	0	0	**10**
**Vikings**	0	14	3	6	**23**

at U.S. Bank Stadium, Minneapolis, Minnesota

- Date: October 15
- Game time: 12:00 p.m. CDT
- Game weather: None (indoor stadium)
- Game attendance: 66,848
- Referee: Ronald Torbert (62)
- TV announcers (Fox): Thom Brennaman, Troy Aikman and Erin Andrews
- Recap, Game Book

Game information

**First quarter**

- No scoring plays.

**Second quarter**

- MIN – Jerick McKinnon 27-yard pass from Case Keenum (Kai Forbath kick), 14:53. Vikings 7–0. **Drive: 2 plays, 42 yards, 0:11.**
- GB – Davante Adams 14-yard pass from Brett Hundley (Mason Crosby kick), 10:40. Tied 7–7. **Drive: 3 plays, 18 yards, 1:24.**
- MIN – Jerick McKinnon 3-yard run (Kai Forbath kick), 7:22. Vikings 14–7. **Drive: 8 plays, 84 yards, 3:18.**
- GB – Mason Crosby 26-yard field goal, 1:51. Vikings 14–10. **Drive: 7 plays, 30 yards, 2:11.**

**Third quarter**

- MIN – Kai Forbath 36-yard field goal, 9:35. Vikings 17–10. **Drive: 12 plays, 57 yards, 5:25.**

**Fourth quarter**

- MIN – Kai Forbath 34-yard field goal, 14:57. Vikings 20–10. **Drive: 11 plays, 66 yards, 5:16.**
- MIN – Kai Forbath 53-yard field goal, 10:47. Vikings 23–10. **Drive: 4 plays, 0 yards, 1:29.**

**Top passers**

- GB – Brett Hundley – 18/33, 157 yards, TD, 3 INT
- MIN – Case Keenum – 24/38, 239 yards, TD, INT

**Top rushers**

- GB – Aaron Jones – 13 rushes, 41 yards
- MIN – Jerick McKinnon – 16 rushes, 69 yards, TD

**Top receivers**

- GB – Jordy Nelson – 6 receptions, 60 yards
- MIN – Adam Thielen – 9 receptions, 97 yards

==== Week 7: vs. Baltimore Ravens ====
Week 7: Baltimore Ravens at Minnesota Vikings – Game summary

Quarter	1	2	3	4	Total
Ravens	3	3	3	7	**16**
**Vikings**	3	6	9	6	**24**

at U.S. Bank Stadium, Minneapolis, Minnesota

- Date: October 22
- Game time: 12:00 p.m. CDT
- Game weather: None (indoor stadium)
- Game attendance: 66,751
- Referee: Carl Cheffers (51)
- TV announcers (CBS): Greg Gumbel, Trent Green and Jamie Erdahl
- Recap, Game Book

Game information

**First quarter**

- BAL – Justin Tucker 48-yard field goal, 8:30. Ravens 3–0. **Drive: 9 plays, 35 yards, 4:11.**
- MIN – Kai Forbath 52-yard field goal, 3:39. Tied 3–3. **Drive: 12 plays, 41 yards, 4:51.**

**Second quarter**

- MIN – Kai Forbath 51-yard field goal, 12:55. Vikings 6–3. **Drive: 8 plays, 38 yards, 2:50.**
- BAL – Justin Tucker 57-yard field goal, 9:56. Tied 6–6. **Drive: 6 plays, 33 yards, 2:59.**
- MIN – Kai Forbath 43-yard field goal, 0:35. Vikings 9–6. **Drive: 15 plays, 60 yards, 7:01.**

**Third quarter**

- MIN – Kai Forbath 43-yard field goal, 10:53. Vikings 12–6. **Drive: 7 plays, 50 yards, 4:07.**
- MIN – Latavius Murray 29-yard run (kick failed, hit right upright), 7:58. Vikings 18–6. **Drive: 3 plays, 45 yards, 1:21.**
- BAL – Justin Tucker 47-yard field goal, 2:58. Vikings 18–9. **Drive: 10 plays, 46 yards, 5:00.**

**Fourth quarter**

- MIN – Kai Forbath 34-yard field goal, 11:54. Vikings 21–9. **Drive: 6 plays, 35 yards, 2:15.**
- MIN – Kai Forbath 32-yard field goal, 3:03. Vikings 24–9. **Drive: 12 plays, 64 yards, 6:47.**
- BAL – Chris Moore 13-yard pass from Joe Flacco (Justin Tucker kick), 0:00. Vikings 24–16. **Drive: 14 plays, 68 yards, 3:03.**

**Top passers**

- BAL – Joe Flacco – 27/39, 186 yards, TD
- MIN – Case Keenum – 20/31, 188 yards, INT

**Top rushers**

- BAL – Alex Collins – 10 rushes, 30 yards
- MIN – Latavius Murray – 18 rushes, 113 yards, TD

**Top receivers**

- BAL – Benjamin Watson – 5 receptions, 38 yards
- MIN – Jarius Wright – 3 receptions, 54 yards

==== Week 8: at Cleveland Browns ====
NFL London Games

Week 8: Minnesota Vikings at Cleveland Browns – Game summary

Quarter	1	2	3	4	Total
**Vikings**	3	9	11	10	**33**
Browns	6	7	3	0	**16**

at Twickenham Stadium, London, England

- Date: October 29
- Game time: 2:30 p.m. BST/8:30 a.m. CDT
- Game weather: Partly cloudy, 56 °F (13 °C)
- Game attendance: 74,237
- Referee: Jeff Triplette (42)
- TV announcers (NFLN): Greg Gumbel, Trent Green and Jamie Erdahl
- Recap, Game Book

Game information

**First quarter**

- CLE – Isaiah Crowell 26-yard run (kick failed, hit right upright), 11:20. Browns 6–0. **Drive: 2 plays, 37 yards, 0:29.**
- MIN – Kai Forbath 35-yard field goal, 5:27. Browns 6–3. **Drive: 7 plays, 18 yards, 3:26.**

**Second quarter**

- MIN – Adam Thielen 18-yard pass from Case Keenum (kick blocked), 2:48. Vikings 9–6. **Drive: 7 plays, 60 yards, 3:12.**
- CLE – DeShone Kizer 1-yard run (Zane Gonzalez kick), 0:40. Browns 13–9. **Drive: 8 plays, 82 yards, 2:08.**
- MIN – Kai Forbath 34-yard field goal, 0:00. Browns 13–12. **Drive: 6 plays, 62 yards, 0:40.**

**Third quarter**

- MIN – Kai Forbath 43-yard field goal, 13:32. Vikings 15–13. **Drive: 4 plays, 5 yards, 1:19.**
- CLE – Zane Gonzalez 23-yard field goal, 5:34. Browns 16–15. **Drive: 12 plays, 55 yards, 4:57.**
- MIN – Jerick McKinnon 1-yard run (Jerick McKinnon run), 1:16. Vikings 23–16. **Drive: 8 plays, 75 yards, 4:18.**

**Fourth quarter**

- MIN – Kyle Rudolph 4-yard pass from Case Keenum (Kai Forbath kick), 10:06. Vikings 30–16. **Drive: 9 plays, 84 yards, 4:47.**
- MIN – Kai Forbath 51-yard field goal, 1:09. Vikings 33–16. **Drive: 4 plays, −1 yard, 1:42.**

**Top passers**

- MIN – Case Keenum – 27/43, 288 yards, 2 TD, INT
- CLE – DeShone Kizer – 18/34, 179 yards

**Top rushers**

- MIN – Jerick McKinnon – 14 rushes, 50 yards, TD
- CLE – Isaiah Crowell – 11 rushes, 64 yards, TD

**Top receivers**

- MIN – Adam Thielen – 5 receptions, 98 yards, TD
- CLE – Isaiah Crowell – 4 receptions, 54 yards

==== Week 10: at Washington Redskins ====
Week 10: Minnesota Vikings at Washington Redskins – Game summary

Quarter	1	2	3	4	Total
**Vikings**	7	21	7	3	**38**
Redskins	10	7	3	10	**30**

at FedExField, Landover, Maryland

- Date: November 12
- Game time: 1:00 p.m. EST/12:00 p.m. CST
- Game weather: Cloudy, 44 °F (7 °C)
- Game attendance: 74,476
- Referee: Bill Vinovich (52)
- TV announcers (Fox): Kevin Burkhardt, Charles Davis and Pam Oliver
- Recap, Game Book

Game information

**First quarter**

- WAS – Maurice Harris 36-yard pass from Kirk Cousins (Nick Rose kick), 10:57. Redskins 7–0. **Drive: 7 plays, 75 yards, 4:03.**
- MIN – Latavius Murray 1-yard run (Kai Forbath kick), 8:18. Tied 7–7. **Drive: 5 plays, 75 yards, 2:39.**
- WAS – Nick Rose 28-yard field goal, 0:08. Redskins 10–7. **Drive: 10 plays, 52 yards, 4:33.**

**Second quarter**

- MIN – Stefon Diggs 3-yard pass from Case Keenum (Kai Forbath kick), 11:45. Vikings 14–10. **Drive: 9 plays, 75 yards, 3:23.**
- WAS – Kirk Cousins 1-yard run (Nick Rose kick), 4:37. Redskins 17–14. **Drive: 13 plays, 60 yards, 7:08.**
- MIN – Adam Thielen 7-yard pass from Case Keenum (Kai Forbath kick), 1:49. Vikings 21–17. **Drive: 6 plays, 71 yards, 2:48.**
- MIN – David Morgan II 1-yard pass from Case Keenum (Kai Forbath kick), 0:22. Vikings 28–17. **Drive: 3 plays, 23 yards, 1:16.**

**Third quarter**

- MIN – Jarius Wright 7-yard pass from Case Keenum (Kai Forbath kick), 12:22. Vikings 35–17. **Drive: 6 plays, 72 yards, 2:38.**
- WAS – Nick Rose 21-yard field goal, 8:24. Vikings 35–20. **Drive: 11 plays, 69 yards, 3:58.**

**Fourth quarter**

- WAS – Kirk Cousins 2-yard run (Nick Rose kick), 14:47. Vikings 35–27. **Drive: 2 plays, 2 yards, 0:06.**
- MIN – Kai Forbath 53-yard field goal, 7:45. Vikings 38–27. **Drive: 13 plays, 40 yards, 7:02.**
- WAS – Nick Rose 55-yard field goal, 1:14. Vikings 38–30. **Drive: 13 plays, 41 yards, 2:29.**

**Top passers**

- MIN – Case Keenum – 21/29, 304 yards, 4 TD, 2 INT
- WAS – Kirk Cousins – 26/45, 327 yards, TD, INT

**Top rushers**

- MIN – Latavius Murray – 17 rushes, 68 yards, TD
- WAS – Samaje Perine – 9 rushes, 35 yards

**Top receivers**

- MIN – Adam Thielen – 8 receptions, 166 yards, TD
- WAS – Jamison Crowder – 4 receptions, 76 yards

==== Week 11: vs. Los Angeles Rams ====
Week 11: Los Angeles Rams at Minnesota Vikings – Game summary

Quarter	1	2	3	4	Total
Rams	7	0	0	0	**7**
**Vikings**	0	7	0	17	**24**

at U.S. Bank Stadium, Minneapolis, Minnesota

- Date: November 19
- Game time: 12:00 p.m. CST
- Game weather: None (indoor stadium)
- Game attendance: 66,809
- Referee: Walt Anderson (66)
- TV announcers (Fox): Kevin Burkhardt, Charles Davis, Greg Olsen and Pam Oliver
- Recap, Game Book

Game information

**First quarter**

- LAR – Todd Gurley 6-yard run (Greg Zuerlein kick), 10:42. Rams 7–0. **Drive: 9 plays, 75 yards, 4:18.**

**Second quarter**

- MIN – Latavius Murray 8-yard run (Kai Forbath kick), 13:31. Tied 7–7. **Drive: 7 plays, 30 yards, 3:09.**

**Third quarter**

- No scoring plays.

**Fourth quarter**

- MIN – Latavius Murray 2-yard run (Kai Forbath kick), 14:15. Vikings 14–7. **Drive: 11 plays, 71 yards, 6:01.**
- MIN – Adam Thielen 65-yard pass from Case Keenum (Kai Forbath kick), 10:14. Vikings 21–7. **Drive: 5 plays, 93 yards, 2:23.**
- MIN – Kai Forbath 39-yard field goal, 2:23. Vikings 24–7. **Drive: 12 plays, 64 yards, 5:55.**

**Top passers**

- LAR – Jared Goff – 23/37, 225 yards
- MIN – Case Keenum – 27/38, 280 yards, TD

**Top rushers**

- LAR – Todd Gurley – 15 rushes, 37 yards, TD
- MIN – Latavius Murray – 15 rushes, 95 yards, 2 TD

**Top receivers**

- LAR – Robert Woods – 8 receptions, 81 yards
- MIN – Adam Thielen – 6 receptions, 123 yards, TD

==== Week 12: at Detroit Lions ====
NFL on Thanksgiving Day

Week 12: Minnesota Vikings at Detroit Lions – Game summary

Quarter	1	2	3	4	Total
**Vikings**	13	7	7	3	**30**
Lions	0	10	6	7	**23**

at Ford Field, Detroit, Michigan

- Date: November 23
- Game time: 12:30 p.m. EST/11:30 a.m. CST
- Game weather: None (indoor stadium)
- Game attendance: 66,613
- Referee: Tony Corrente (99)
- TV announcers (Fox): Joe Buck, Troy Aikman and Erin Andrews
- Recap, Game Book

Game information

**First quarter**

- MIN – Kyle Rudolph 1-yard pass from Case Keenum (kick blocked), 5:29. Vikings 6–0. **Drive: 14 plays, 80 yards, 6:59.**
- MIN – Case Keenum 9-yard run (Kai Forbath kick), 3:55. Vikings 13–0. **Drive: 3 plays, 39 yards, 0:56.**

**Second quarter**

- DET – Matt Prater 32-yard field goal, 10:15. Vikings 13–3. **Drive: 12 plays, 69 yards, 5:33.**
- MIN – Kyle Rudolph 22-yard pass from Case Keenum (Kai Forbath kick), 0:37. Vikings 20–3. **Drive: 5 plays, 74 yards, 1:21.**
- DET – Marvin Jones 6-yard pass from Matthew Stafford (Matt Prater kick), 0:10. Vikings 20–10. **Drive: 3 plays, 75 yards, 0:27.**

**Third quarter**

- MIN – Latavius Murray 2-yard run (Kai Forbath kick), 12:52. Vikings 27–10. **Drive: 4 plays, 75 yards, 2:08.**
- DET – Matt Prater 32-yard field goal, 7:08. Vikings 27–13. **Drive: 12 plays, 61 yards, 5:44.**
- DET – Matt Prater 50-yard field goal, 1:03. Vikings 27–16. **Drive: 8 plays, 40 yards, 4:01.**

**Fourth quarter**

- DET – Marvin Jones 43-yard pass from Matthew Stafford (Matt Prater kick), 14:16. Vikings 27–23. **Drive: 3 plays, 39 yards, 0:33.**
- MIN – Kai Forbath 36-yard field goal, 3:42. Vikings 30–23. **Drive: 9 plays, 45 yards, 2:39.**

**Top passers**

- MIN – Case Keenum – 21/30, 282 yards, 2 TD
- DET – Matthew Stafford – 20/35, 250 yards, 2 TD, INT

**Top rushers**

- MIN – Latavius Murray – 20 rushes, 84 yards, TD
- DET – Theo Riddick – 5 rushes, 20 yards

**Top receivers**

- MIN – Adam Thielen – 8 receptions, 89 yards
- DET – Marvin Jones – 6 receptions, 109 yards, 2 TD

==== Week 13: at Atlanta Falcons ====
Week 13: Minnesota Vikings at Atlanta Falcons – Game summary

Quarter	1	2	3	4	Total
**Vikings**	0	7	0	7	**14**
Falcons	3	3	3	0	**9**

at Mercedes-Benz Stadium, Atlanta, Georgia

- Date: December 3
- Game time: 1:00 p.m. EST/12:00 p.m. CST
- Game weather: None (retractable roof closed)
- Game attendance: 71,185
- Referee: Brad Allen (122)
- TV announcers (Fox): Kevin Burkhardt, Charles Davis and Pam Oliver
- Recap, Game Book

Game information

**First quarter**

- ATL – Matt Bryant 38-yard field goal, 5:24. Falcons 3–0. **Drive: 15 plays, 58 yards, 7:24.**

**Second quarter**

- MIN – Jerick McKinnon 2-yard pass from Case Keenum (Kai Forbath kick), 10:01. Vikings 7–3. **Drive: 9 plays, 53 yards, 5:04.**
- ATL – Matt Bryant 36-yard field goal, 5:47. Vikings 7–6. **Drive: 8 plays, 65 yards, 4:14.**

**Third quarter**

- ATL – Matt Bryant 47-yard field goal, 11:57. Falcons 9–7. **Drive: 7 plays, 46 yards, 3:03.**

**Fourth quarter**

- MIN – Kyle Rudolph 6-yard pass from Case Keenum (Kai Forbath kick), 14:56. Vikings 14–9. **Drive: 15 plays, 89 yards, 8:15.**

**Top passers**

- MIN – Case Keenum – 25/30, 227 yards, 2 TD
- ATL – Matt Ryan – 16/29, 173 yards

**Top rushers**

- MIN – Latavius Murray – 16 rushes, 76 yards
- ATL – Devonta Freeman – 12 rushes, 74 yards

**Top receivers**

- MIN – Adam Thielen – 4 receptions, 51 yards
- ATL – Mohamed Sanu – 3 receptions, 43 yards

==== Week 14: at Carolina Panthers ====
Week 14: Minnesota Vikings at Carolina Panthers – Game summary

Quarter	1	2	3	4	Total
Vikings	7	6	0	11	**24**
**Panthers**	7	7	10	7	**31**

at Bank of America Stadium, Charlotte, North Carolina

- Date: December 10
- Game time: 1:00 p.m. EST/12:00 p.m. CST
- Game weather: Sunny, 41 °F (5 °C)
- Game attendance: 73,728
- Referee: Terry McAulay (77)
- TV announcers (CBS): Jim Nantz, Tony Romo and Tracy Wolfson
- Recap, Game Book

Game information

**First quarter**

- CAR – Jonathan Stewart 60-yard run (Graham Gano kick), 10:55. Panthers 7–0. **Drive: 3 plays, 69 yards, 1:35.**
- MIN – Kyle Rudolph 18-yard pass from Case Keenum (Kai Forbath kick), 6:28. Tied 7–7. **Drive: 10 plays, 75 yards, 4:27.**

**Second quarter**

- CAR – Jonathan Stewart 1-yard run (Graham Gano kick), 14:16. Panthers 14–7. **Drive: 14 plays, 89 yards, 7:12.**
- MIN – Kai Forbath 30-yard field goal, 5:02. Panthers 14–10. **Drive: 9 plays, 62 yards, 4:03.**
- MIN – Kai Forbath 22-yard field goal, 0:07. Panthers 14–13. **Drive: 11 plays, 64 yards, 2:26.**

**Third quarter**

- CAR – Devin Funchess 18-yard pass from Cam Newton (Graham Gano kick), 8:42. Panthers 21–13. **Drive: 10 plays, 75 yards, 6:18.**
- CAR – Graham Gano 41-yard field goal, 6:51. Panthers 24–13. **Drive: 4 plays, 8 yards, 1:37.**

**Fourth quarter**

- MIN – Adam Thielen 52-yard pass from Case Keenum (Case Keenum–Blake Bell pass), 5:36. Panthers 24–21. **Drive: 4 plays, 73 yards, 1:28.**
- MIN – Kai Forbath 27-yard field goal, 3:07. Tied 24–24. **Drive: 4 plays, −3 yards, 1:29.**
- CAR – Jonathan Stewart 1-yard run (Graham Gano kick), 1:47. Panthers 31–24. **Drive: 5 plays, 75 yards, 1:20.**

**Top passers**

- MIN – Case Keenum – 27/44, 280 yards, 2 TD, 2 INT
- CAR – Cam Newton – 13/25, 137 yards, TD, INT

**Top rushers**

- MIN – Jerick McKinnon – 7 rushes, 46 yards
- CAR – Jonathan Stewart – 16 rushes, 103 yards, 3 TD

**Top receivers**

- MIN – Adam Thielen – 6 receptions, 105 yards, TD
- CAR – Devin Funchess – 3 receptions, 59 yards, TD

==== Week 15: vs. Cincinnati Bengals ====
Week 15: Cincinnati Bengals at Minnesota Vikings – Game summary

Quarter	1	2	3	4	Total
Bengals	0	0	0	7	**7**
**Vikings**	17	7	3	7	**34**

at U.S. Bank Stadium, Minneapolis, Minnesota

- Date: December 17
- Game time: 12:00 p.m. CST
- Game weather: None (indoor stadium)
- Game attendance: 66,833
- Referee: Walt Coleman (65)
- TV announcers (CBS): Ian Eagle, Dan Fouts and Evan Washburn
- Recap, Game Book

Game information

**First quarter**

- MIN – Latavius Murray 1-yard run (Kai Forbath kick), 10:31. Vikings 7–0. **Drive: 9 plays, 75 yards, 4:29.**
- MIN – Eric Kendricks 31-yard interception return (Kai Forbath kick), 5:54. Vikings 14–0.
- MIN – Kai Forbath 53-yard field goal, 1:30. Vikings 17–0. **Drive: 4 plays, 3 yards, 2:10.**

**Second quarter**

- MIN – Stefon Diggs 20-yard pass from Case Keenum (Kai Forbath kick), 6:41. Vikings 24–0. **Drive: 8 plays, 77 yards, 4:24.**

**Third quarter**

- MIN – Kai Forbath 35-yard field goal, 6:34. Vikings 27–0. **Drive: 10 plays, 71 yards, 5:29.**

**Fourth quarter**

- MIN – Kyle Rudolph 1-yard pass from Case Keenum (Kai Forbath kick), 12:53. Vikings 34–0. **Drive: 7 plays, 83 yards, 3:38.**
- CIN – Giovani Bernard 2-yard run (Randy Bullock kick), 6:22. Vikings 34–7. **Drive: 6 plays, 23 yards, 2:56.**

**Top passers**

- CIN – Andy Dalton – 11/22, 113 yards, 2 INT
- MIN – Case Keenum – 20/23, 236 yards, 2 TD

**Top rushers**

- CIN – Giovani Bernard – 15 rushes, 37 yards, TD
- MIN – Latavius Murray – 20 rushes, 76 yards, TD

**Top receivers**

- CIN – Brandon LaFell – 8 receptions, 81 yards
- MIN – Jerick McKinnon – 7 receptions, 114 yards

==== Week 16: at Green Bay Packers ====
Week 16: Minnesota Vikings at Green Bay Packers – Game summary

Quarter	1	2	3	4	Total
**Vikings**	10	0	3	3	**16**
Packers	0	0	0	0	**0**

at Lambeau Field, Green Bay, Wisconsin

- Date: December 23
- Game time: 7:30 p.m. CST
- Game weather: Clear, 10 °F (−12 °C)
- Game attendance: 78,092
- Referee: Carl Cheffers (51)
- TV announcers (NBC): Al Michaels, Cris Collinsworth and Michele Tafoya
- Recap, Game Book

Game information

**First quarter**

- MIN – Kai Forbath 49-yard field goal, 8:28. Vikings 3–0. **Drive: 9 plays, 39 yards, 3:50.**
- MIN – Stefon Diggs 4-yard pass from Case Keenum (Kai Forbath kick), 0:56. Vikings 10–0. **Drive: 5 plays, 68 yards, 2:09.**

**Second quarter**

- No scoring plays.

**Third quarter**

- MIN – Kai Forbath 20-yard field goal, 1:20. Vikings 13–0. **Drive: 12 plays, 62 yards, 6:12.**

**Fourth quarter**

- MIN – Kai Forbath 27-yard field goal, 2:56. Vikings 16–0. **Drive: 4 plays, 5 yards, 1:00.**

**Top passers**

- MIN – Case Keenum – 14/25, 139 yards, TD
- GB – Brett Hundley – 17/40, 130 yards, 2 INT

**Top rushers**

- MIN – Latavius Murray – 21 rushes, 69 yards
- GB – Jamaal Williams – 15 rushes, 58 yards

**Top receivers**

- MIN – Stefon Diggs – 5 receptions, 60 yards, TD
- GB – Lance Kendricks – 4 receptions, 36 yards

==== Week 17: vs. Chicago Bears ====
Week 17: Chicago Bears at Minnesota Vikings – Game summary

Quarter	1	2	3	4	Total
Bears	0	7	0	3	**10**
**Vikings**	7	9	7	0	**23**

at U.S. Bank Stadium, Minneapolis, Minnesota

- Date: December 31
- Game time: 12:00 p.m. CST
- Game weather: None (indoor stadium)
- Game attendance: 66,802
- Referee: Craig Wrolstad (4)
- TV announcers (Fox): Kevin Burkhardt, Charles Davis and Pam Oliver
- Recap, Game Book

Game information

**First quarter**

- MIN – Latavius Murray 1-yard run (Kai Forbath kick), 9:07. Vikings 7–0. **Drive: 7 plays, 70 yards, 3:45.**

**Second quarter**

- MIN – Latavius Murray 1-yard run (Kai Forbath kick), 9:30. Vikings 14–0. **Drive: 11 plays, 71 yards, 6:08.**
- CHI – Bryce Callahan 59-yard punt return (Mike Nugent kick), 5:50. Vikings 14–7.
- MIN – Penalty on Mitchell Trubisky enforced in the end zone for a safety, 2:25. Vikings 16–7.

**Third quarter**

- MIN – Stefon Diggs 15-yard pass from Case Keenum (Kai Forbath kick), 0:14. Vikings 23–7. **Drive: 7 plays, 63 yards, 3:36.**

**Fourth quarter**

- CHI – Mike Nugent 55-yard field goal, 8:22. Vikings 23–10. **Drive: 5 plays, 11 yards, 1:31.**

**Top passers**

- CHI – Mitchell Trubisky – 20/36, 178 yards
- MIN – Case Keenum – 21/29, 189 yards, TD

**Top rushers**

- CHI – Tarik Cohen – 3 rushes, 13 yards
- MIN – Latavius Murray – 20 rushes, 111 yards, 2 TD

**Top receivers**

- CHI – Dontrelle Inman – 5 receptions, 94 yards
- MIN – Stefon Diggs – 6 receptions, 65 yards, TD

=== Standings ===
==== Division ====
NFC North
	W	L	T	PCT	DIV	CONF	PF	PA	STK
^{(2)} Minnesota Vikings	13	3	0	.813	5–1	10–2	382	252	W3
Detroit Lions	9	7	0	.563	5–1	8–4	410	376	W1
Green Bay Packers	7	9	0	.438	2–4	5–7	320	384	L3
Chicago Bears	5	11	0	.313	0–6	1–11	264	320	L1

==== Conference ====
NFC
#	Team	Division	W	L	T	PCT	DIV	CONF	SOS	SOV	STK
**Division leaders**
1 (Note: Philadelphia claimed the No. 1 seed over Minnesota based on winning percentage vs. common opponents. Philadelphia's cumulative record against Carolina, Chicago, the Los Angeles Rams and Washington was 5–0, compared to Minnesota's 4–1 cumulative record against the same four teams.)	Philadelphia Eagles	East	13	3	0	.813	5–1	10–2	.461	.433	L1
2	Minnesota Vikings	North	13	3	0	.813	5–1	10–2	.492	.447	W3
3 (Note: LA Rams claimed the No. 3 seed over New Orleans based on head-to-head victory.)	Los Angeles Rams	West	11	5	0	.688	4–2	7–5	.504	.460	L1
4 (Note: New Orleans clinched the NFC South division over Carolina based on head-to-head sweep.)	New Orleans Saints	South	11	5	0	.688	4–2	8–4	.535	.483	L1
**Wild Cards**
5	Carolina Panthers	South	11	5	0	.688	3–3	7–5	.539	.500	L1
6	Atlanta Falcons	South	10	6	0	.625	4–2	9–3	.543	.475	W1
**Did not qualify for the postseason**
7 (Note: Detroit finished ahead of Dallas and Seattle based on conference record, while Seattle finished ahead of Dallas based on head-to-head victory.)	Detroit Lions	North	9	7	0	.563	5–1	8–4	.496	.368	W1
8	Seattle Seahawks	West	9	7	0	.563	4–2	7–5	.492	.444	L1
9	Dallas Cowboys	East	9	7	0	.563	5–1	7–5	.496	.438	W1
10	Arizona Cardinals	West	8	8	0	.500	3–3	5–7	.488	.406	W2
11 (Note: Green Bay finished ahead of Washington based on record vs. common opponents. Green Bay's cumulative record against Dallas, Minnesota, New Orleans and Seattle was 2–3, compared to Washington's 1–4 cumulative record against the same four teams.)	Green Bay Packers	North	7	9	0	.438	2–4	5–7	.539	.357	L3
12	Washington Redskins	East	7	9	0	.438	1–5	5–7	.539	.429	L1
13	San Francisco 49ers	West	6	10	0	.375	1–5	3–9	.512	.438	W5
14 (Note: Tampa Bay finished ahead of Chicago based on head-to-head victory.)	Tampa Bay Buccaneers	South	5	11	0	.313	1–5	3–9	.555	.375	W1
15	Chicago Bears	North	5	11	0	.313	0–6	1–11	.559	.500	L1
16	New York Giants	East	3	13	0	.188	1–5	1–11	.531	.458	W1
**Tiebreakers** (Note: When breaking ties for three or more teams under the NFL's rules, they are first broken within divisions, then comparing only the highest-ranked remaining team from each division.)

== Postseason ==
=== Schedule ===
Round	Date	Opponent (seed)	Result	Record	Venue	NFL.com recap
Wild Card	Bye					
Divisional	January 14	New Orleans Saints (4)	W 29–24	1–0	U.S. Bank Stadium	Recap
NFC Championship	January 21	at Philadelphia Eagles (1)	L 7–38	1–1	Lincoln Financial Field	Recap

=== Game summaries ===
==== NFC Divisional Playoffs: vs. (4) New Orleans Saints ====
NFC Divisional Playoffs: (4) New Orleans Saints at (2) Minnesota Vikings – Game summary

Quarter	1	2	3	4	Total
Saints	0	0	7	17	24
Vikings	10	7	0	12	29

at U.S. Bank Stadium, Minneapolis, Minnesota

- Date: January 14, 2018
- Game time: 3:40 p.m. CST
- Game weather: None (indoor stadium)
- Game attendance: 66,612
- Referee: Gene Steratore (114)
- TV announcers (Fox): Joe Buck, Troy Aikman, Erin Andrews and Chris Myers
- Recap, Game Book

Game information

First quarter

- MIN – Jerick McKinnon 14-yard run (Kai Forbath kick), 9:45. Vikings 7–0. Drive: 8 plays, 55 yards, 4:15.
- MIN – Kai Forbath 20-yard field goal, 4:42. Vikings 10–0. Drive: 7 plays, 79 yards, 2:27.

Second quarter

- MIN – Latavius Murray 1-yard run (Kai Forbath kick), 9:58. Vikings 17–0. Drive: 12 plays, 58 yards, 6:08.

Third quarter

- NO – Michael Thomas 14-yard pass from Drew Brees (Wil Lutz kick), 1:18. Vikings 17–7. Drive: 12 plays, 80 yards, 6:40.

Fourth quarter

- NO – Michael Thomas 3-yard pass from Drew Brees (Wil Lutz kick), 13:09. Vikings 17–14. Drive: 6 plays, 30 yards, 3:00.
- MIN – Kai Forbath 49-yard field goal, 10:12. Vikings 20–14. Drive: 7 plays, 44 yards, 2:57.
- NO – Alvin Kamara 14-yard pass from Drew Brees (Wil Lutz kick), 3:01. Saints 21–20. Drive: 4 plays, 40 yards, 2:20.
- MIN – Kai Forbath 53-yard field goal, 1:29. Vikings 23–21. Drive: 9 plays, 40 yards, 1:32.
- NO – Wil Lutz 43-yard field goal, 0:25. Saints 24–23. Drive: 11 plays, 50 yards, 1:04.
- MIN – Stefon Diggs 61-yard pass from Case Keenum (run failed), 0:00. Vikings 29–24. Drive: 4 plays, 75 yards, 0:25.

Top passers

- NO – Drew Brees – 25/40, 294 yards, 3 TD, 2 INT
- MIN – Case Keenum – 25/40, 318 yards, TD, INT

Top rushers

- NO – Alvin Kamara – 11 rushes, 43 yards
- MIN – Latavius Murray – 19 rushes, 50 yards, TD

Top receivers

- NO – Michael Thomas – 7 receptions, 85 yards, 2 TD
- MIN – Stefon Diggs – 6 receptions, 137 yards, TD

==== NFC Championship: at (1) Philadelphia Eagles ====
NFC Championship: (2) Minnesota Vikings at (1) Philadelphia Eagles – Game summary

Quarter	1	2	3	4	Total
Vikings	7	0	0	0	7
Eagles	7	17	7	7	38

at Lincoln Financial Field, Philadelphia, Pennsylvania

- Date: January 21, 2018
- Game time: 6:40 p.m. EST/5:40 p.m. CST
- Game weather: Cloudy, 47 °F (8 °C)
- Game attendance: 69,596
- Referee: Ed Hochuli (85)
- TV announcers (Fox): Joe Buck, Troy Aikman, Erin Andrews and Chris Myers
- Recap, Game Book

Game information

First quarter

- MIN – Kyle Rudolph 25-yard pass from Case Keenum (Kai Forbath kick), 10:14. Vikings 7–0. Drive: 9 plays, 75 yards, 4:46.
- PHI – Patrick Robinson 50-yard interception return (Jake Elliott kick), 6:26. Tied 7–7.

Second quarter

- PHI – LeGarrette Blount 11-yard run (Jake Elliott kick), 13:37. Eagles 14–7. Drive: 12 plays, 75 yards, 6:20.
- PHI – Alshon Jeffery 53-yard pass from Nick Foles (Jake Elliott kick), 1:09. Eagles 21–7. Drive: 7 plays, 76 yards, 2:07.
- PHI – Jake Elliott 38-yard field goal, 0:00. Eagles 24–7. Drive: 4 plays, 60 yards, 0:29.

Third quarter

- PHI – Torrey Smith 41-yard pass from Nick Foles (Jake Elliott kick), 10:05. Eagles 31–7. Drive: 8 plays, 75 yards, 4:55.

Fourth quarter

- PHI – Alshon Jeffery 5-yard pass from Nick Foles (Jake Elliott kick), 14:10. Eagles 38–7. Drive: 12 plays, 92 yards, 7:11.

Top passers

- MIN – Case Keenum – 28/48, 271 yards, TD, 2 INT
- PHI – Nick Foles – 26/33, 352 yards, 3 TD

Top rushers

- MIN – Jerick McKinnon – 10 rushes, 40 yards
- PHI – Jay Ajayi – 18 rushes, 73 yards

Top receivers

- MIN – Jerick McKinnon – 11 receptions, 86 yards
- PHI – Zach Ertz – 8 receptions, 93 yards

With their win against the Saints in the NFC Divisional Round, Minnesota became the first team in the Super Bowl era to advance to the conference championship game the same year they hosted the Super Bowl. Despite going to Lincoln Financial Field as three-point favorites, primarily due to a general lack of confidence in Eagles second-string quarterback Nick Foles, the Vikings lost in a massive upset to the number 1 seeded Philadelphia Eagles by a score of 38–7. Although the Vikings took an early lead on their opening drive via a pass from Case Keenum to Kyle Rudolph, the Eagles leveled the scores on a 50-yard Patrick Robinson interception return before scoring a further 31 unanswered points over the final three-quarters. This loss extended the Vikings' NFC title drought to 41 seasons, second only to the Detroit Lions' 48.

== Pro Bowl ==
Four Vikings players were elected to the Pro Bowl when the rosters were announced on December 19, 2017, with three-time selection Everson Griffen, two-time selection Xavier Rhodes and first-timer Adam Thielen all named as starters, while Griffen's fellow third-timer Anthony Barr was named on the bench at outside linebacker behind the Cardinals' Chandler Jones and the Redskins' Ryan Kerrigan. Safety Harrison Smith was rated as the best safety in the league by Pro Football Focus over the course of the season, but was not included in the roster for the Pro Bowl, leading to some considering him to be one of the biggest snubs of the season.

Smith was eventually named to the NFC's Pro Bowl roster on January 22, after New York Giants safety Landon Collins withdrew due to injury. Kyle Rudolph was also included after Jimmy Graham pulled out with an injury, while Linval Joseph took the place of the Super Bowl-bound Philadelphia Eagles' Fletcher Cox. Smith will be appearing in his third straight Pro Bowl, while Rudolph and Joseph are appearing in their second career Pro Bowls. Barr and Griffen also pulled out of the Pro Bowl due to injury, replaced by Thomas Davis and Michael Bennett respectively.

== Statistics ==
=== Team leaders ===
Category	Player(s)	Total
Passing yards	Case Keenum	3,547
Passing touchdowns	Case Keenum	22
Rushing yards	Latavius Murray	842
Rushing touchdowns	Latavius Murray	8
Receptions	Adam Thielen	91
Receiving yards	Adam Thielen	1,276
Receiving touchdowns	Stefon Diggs; Kyle Rudolph	8
Points	Kai Forbath	130
Kickoff return yards	Jerick McKinnon	312
Punt return yards	Marcus Sherels	372
Tackles	Eric Kendricks	113
Sacks	Everson Griffen	13.0
Interceptions	Harrison Smith	5
Forced fumbles	Everson Griffen	3

Source: Minnesota Vikings' official website

=== League rankings ===
Category	Total yards	Yards per game	NFL rank (out of 32)
Passing offense	3,753	234.6	11th
Rushing offense	1,957	122.3	7th
Total offense	5,710	356.9	11th
Passing defense	3,078	192.4	2nd
Rushing defense	1,337	83.6	2nd
Total defense	4,415	275.9	1st

Source: NFL.com
