= Jerick McKinnon =

American football player (born 1992)

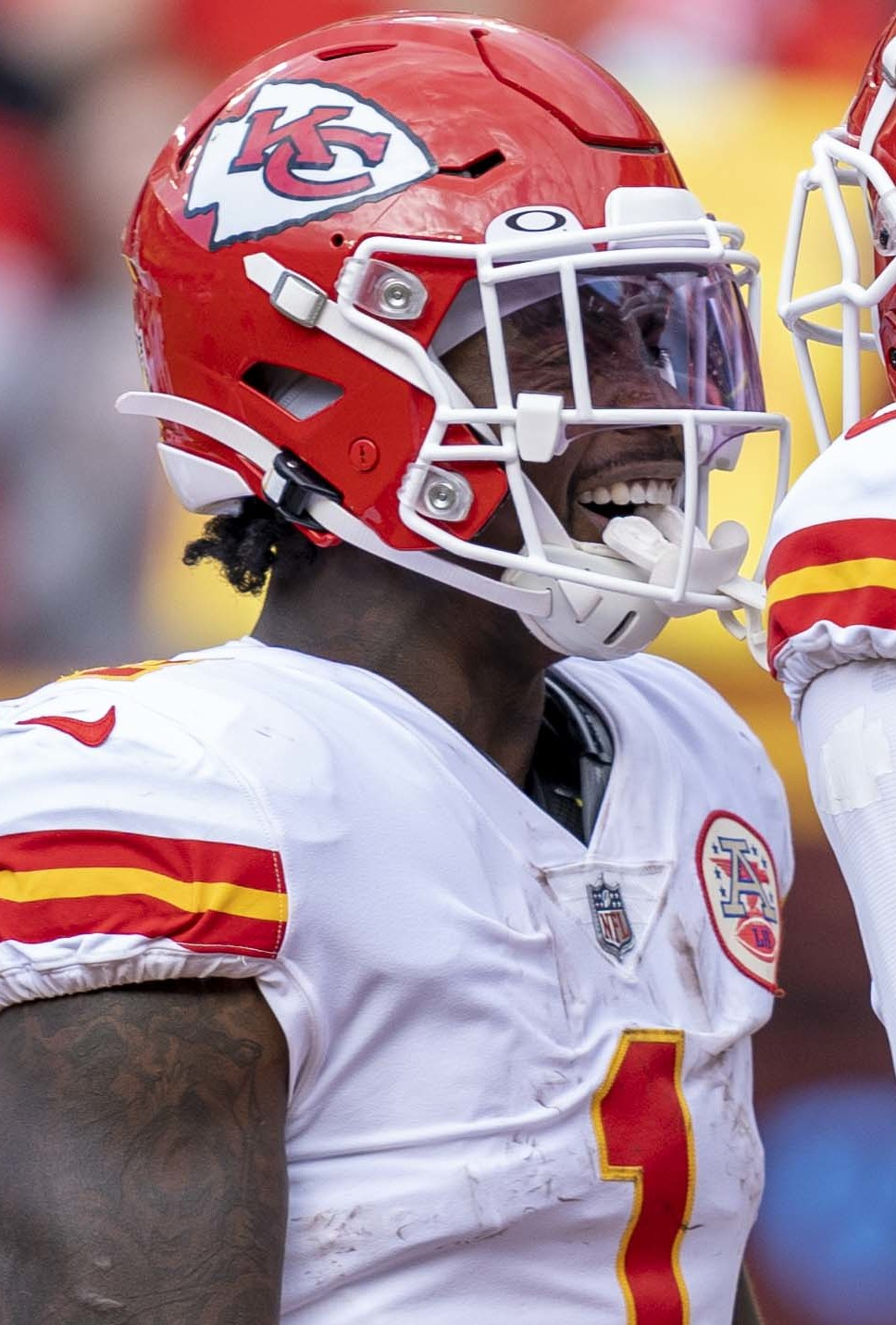
- McKinnon with the Kansas City Chiefs in 2021

Profile
- Position: Running back

Personal information
- Born: May 3, 1992 (age 34); Atlanta, Georgia, U.S.
- Listed height: 5 ft 9 in (1.75 m)
- Listed weight: 209 lb (95 kg)

Career information
- High school: Sprayberry (Marietta, Georgia)
- College: Georgia Southern (2010–2013)
- NFL draft: 2014: 3rd round, 96th overall pick

Career history
- Minnesota Vikings (2014–2017); San Francisco 49ers (2018–2020); Kansas City Chiefs (2021–2023)

Awards and highlights
- 2× Super Bowl champion (LVII, LVIII); First-team All-SoCon (2013); Georgia Southern Athletics Hall of Fame (2024)

Career NFL statistics
- Rushing yards: 2,650
- Rushing average: 4.0
- Rushing touchdowns: 14
- Receptions: 269
- Receiving yards: 2,048
- Receiving touchdowns: 20
- Stats at Pro Football Reference

Jerick Deshun McKinnon (born May 3, 1992), nicknamed "Jet", is an American former professional football running back. He played college football for the Georgia Southern Eagles and was selected by the Minnesota Vikings in the third round of the 2014 NFL draft. McKinnon has also played for the San Francisco 49ers and Kansas City Chiefs.

== Early life ==
McKinnon attended Sprayberry High School in Marietta, Georgia, where he played football and ran track. In football, he played quarterback, running back and wide receiver. McKinnon was an Atlanta Journal-Constitution first-team all-state pick at quarterback. He was also tabbed first-team all-state by the Georgia Sports Writers Association as an athlete and named Region VII AAAA Player of the Year. McKinnon lettered four times on the gridiron for the Yellow Jackets, starting in each of his final three seasons. As a junior, McKinnon was a member of the team that won the region championship playing as a wide receiver en route to earning MVP accolades for the National Underclassmen Ultimate 100. He passed for 1,500 yards and rushed for 1,300 more as a senior, picking up Cobb County Touchdown Club Quarterback of the Year honors in 2009.

McKinnon lettered twice for the Yellow Jackets track & field team, competing in the 100-meter dash (captured the Region VII-AAAA title with a time of 11.04 seconds as a junior), 200-meter dash (placed seventh at the Region VII-AAAA with a time 22.61 seconds) and in the long jump (personal-best leap of 21 ft 8 in (6.60 meters) for the outdoor squad. He was also a member of the 4 × 100 m relay team (42.33 as a senior) and was timed at 4.46 in the 40-yard dash according to Rivals.com.

Regarded as a three-star recruit by Rivals.com, McKinnon committed to Georgia Southern on February 3, 2010. He chose the Eagles over scholarship offers from the Air Force and the Navy.

== College career ==
McKinnon attended Georgia Southern University (GSU) from 2010 to 2013.

McKinnon was originally recruited as a quarterback, handling special team chores before being used as a quarterback and slotback during the 2010 campaign. He played in GSU's triple-option attack from the quarterbacking position through his junior season but was utilized more often as a tailback during his senior season. McKinnon, a four-year letter winner, finished his career third all-time on the Georgia Southern list with 3,899 rushing yards and 42 touchdowns (4,138 all-purpose), behind only Adrian Peterson, who had 6,559 yards (NCAA Division I all-time leading rusher from 1998 to 2001) and Jermaine Austin, who posted 5,411 from 2002 to 2005. McKinnon also caught 10 passes for 165 yards and a score, completed 32-of-81 passes (39.50%) for 929 yards, 12 touchdowns, and five interceptions, gained 74 yards on four kickoff returns and also recorded five tackles (four solos) with a pair of pass deflections, two interceptions, and two quarterback pressures.

=== Freshman season (2010) ===
In his first season in Statesboro, McKinnon chose to wear number 15. He played in 10 games for the Eagles, rushing for 430 yards on 109 attempts and three touchdowns. He picked up his first career score against Savannah State, taking over the quarterback duties in the fourth quarter. McKinnon briefly owned the record for most rushing attempts in a single game after rushing for a top single-game mark of 182 yards on 35 attempts at The Citadel, 84 of those yards came in the second quarter as he helped lead the Eagles to their first shutout of an opponent since 2003. In the Georgia State game, McKinnon assumed signal calling after Jaybo Shaw was injured early in the game. McKinnon made his first career start against Samford the following week and had a one-yard touchdown run for his first score against the Bulldogs. McKinnon directed the Eagles to their third-highest rushing total of the year with 323 yards against South Carolina State.

=== Sophomore season (2011) ===
McKinnon played in 13 games with seven starts as a sophomore. He was the only player on the Eagles roster to throw for, rush for, and catch a touchdown during the season. McKinnon finished the season with 705 all-purpose yards and nine combined touchdowns (seven rushing, one receiving, and one passing). In the season opener at Samford on September 3, he rushed 12 times for 80 yards and scored two touchdowns. McKinnon rushed for a touchdown and caught a touchdown pass in the home opener against Tusculum on September 10. Two weeks later against Western Carolina, he totaled a season-high 114 rushing yards and two scores on 10 carries and completed two passes for 39 yards and a touchdown. McKinnon compiled 98 rushing yards on just nine carries against Presbyterian. He played three playoff games on defense and totaled four tackles and two pass breakups, while also intercepting two passes in the Maine Football Championship Subdivision (FCS) Playoff game. In that game, McKinnon also returned one kickoff for 41 yards.

=== Junior season (2012) ===
In 2012, McKinnon joined Georgia Southern's upper echelon of running backs with 1,817 rushing yards on 269 attempts, third-highest single-season total after Peterson's record 1,932 yards in 1998 and Jayson Foster in second with 1,844 in 2007. For his efforts, McKinnon earned first-team All-American honors at quarterback from the College Sports Journal and College Sporting News and was awarded the Iron Works Dedication Trophy (awarded to the team's most outstanding lifter). His team-best 129.8 rushing yards per game average ranked seventh nationally and was eighth on Georgia Southern's single-season list, most by a quarterback since Jayson Foster in 2007 (167.6), while his 20 rushing touchdowns in the season ranked seventh on the single-season list. McKinnon led the Eagles in rushing six times, with significant influence on Georgia Southern's ninth NCAA rushing title (399.4 ypg), best across all divisions. He was also a factor in Eagles claiming four of the top seven NCAA Division I single-game rushing totals. Of Georgia Southern's 63 offensive plays of 25 yards or longer in 2012, McKinnon had a hand in 30 (17 rushing plays, seven rushing touchdowns).

In the season opener against Jacksonville, McKinnon rushed for 71 yards and a touchdown playing at both B-back and quarterback. On December 2, he had top season marks for rushing attempts with 34 and rushing yards with 316 against Central Arkansas in a playoff game (12–1), to surpass the single-game record for rushing yards by a quarterback, previously held by Jayson Foster. McKinnon's 316-yard effort was third-best in the FCS, eighth-best in Division I and just 17 yards shy of tying the Georgia Southern single-game record held by Peterson, who had 333 against UMass back in 1999. His longest runs were of 57, 52 and 51 yards; the 57-yarder romp ended the Eagles' three-play scoring drive for the first touchdown of the game, while the 51-yarder brought Georgia Southern inside the 10 where McKinnon punched it in for his second rushing touchdown of the day. He was also credited with 79 passing yards against the Bears, including a 47-yard completion to Zach Walker and a 32-yard touchdown reception by Darreion Robinson. McKinnon gained 171 yards and scored a season-best four rushing touchdown against Old Dominion with three of them coming in the fourth quarter. After flipping roles with Darreion Robinson, he caught a 15-yard pass to convert on 3rd-and-6 in ODU territory. Against Furman, McKinnon flirted with the 200-yard rushing yards total, but finished with 198 and three rushing touchdowns. Against Howard, he accounted for five touchdowns, three rushing and two pass completions for touchdowns. McKinnon sprinted for a season-long rush of 87 yards for a touchdown in only 12 seconds. His 87-yard scoring play against the Bisons ranks as the third-longest in Georgia Southern history behind only Mark Myer's 92-yard score run against Appalachian State in 2002 and Peterson's 91-yard score against East Tennessee State in 1998. He had two passing touchdowns at Western Carolina. McKinnon hooked up with Zack Walker for one of the shortest touchdown drives of the year, a career-long 75-yard pass, the longest pass completion of the 2012 season, and 11th-longest in Georgia Southern history, against Furman in a mere 10 seconds. In that game, McKinnon threw for a team season and career-best 119 yards against the Paladins. In a victory over Samford, he took over at quarterback and led the Eagles in rushing with 162 yards, averaging 12.5 yards per carry. McKinnon rushed for three touchdowns and a game-ending two-point conversion in a triple-overtime thriller at Chattanooga for a total of 20 points. He eluded three Moc defenders rolling left and dashing into the endzone for the game-winning touchdown and followed that play with the two-point conversion. McKinnon's total of 141 rushing yards against the Mocs started his streak of seven-straight games with 100 or more rushing yards. Against the Mocs, McKinnon went 3-for-5 passing for 55 yards with a long throw of 40 to Zach Walker for an acrobatic catch that was featured on ESPN SportsCenter's Top 10 plays of the day. The second-quarter pass completion put the Eagles in the red zone, making the way for McKinnon's second score of the night.

Following his junior season, McKinnon was recognized as a National Strength and Conditioning (NSCA) All-American Strength and earned the Conditioning Athlete of the Year Award. He finished his junior season eighth on the Georgia Southern career list (2,849 yards), just behind Tracy Ham's 3,212 yards (total includes regular-season games only).

=== Senior season (2013) ===
As a senior in 2013, McKinnon was Georgia Southern's leading rusher with his second consecutive 1,000-yard rushing season with 1,050 yards (6.5 avg) and 12 rushing touchdowns, as well as four passing scores. McKinnon was selected for the initial watch list for the Walter Payton Award by The Sports Network and was named team MVP for the second straight year after earning the honors for the first time as a junior at the team's annual banquet. On November 23, he rushed for 125 yards on nine carries for a 13.9 average and scored the game-winning touchdown against Florida, which was Georgia Southern's first win ever over a BCS team. McKinnon had a season-long run with a rush of 66 yards against the Gators, which was the longest recorded against the Gators in 2013. Against Savannah State, he scored the first touchdown of the Eagles' 2013 season with a 66-yard run and threw for a touchdown with an eight-yard toss to Devin Scott against the Tigers, finishing the game with 107 rushing yards and two passes completed. McKinnon tied a career-best with two passing touchdowns against St. Francis, hitting Kentrellis Showers for a 35-yard touchdown pass and a season-long 50-yard score to Montay Crockett. McKinnon eclipsed the 3,000-yard rushing mark with 114 yards against Wofford with six double-digit carries and added two touchdowns in that game. Against The Citadel, he had two rushing touchdowns and 198 yards on the ground, and also picked up a reception and threw for the two-point conversion against the Bulldogs in that win. McKinnon directed the Eagles offense to majority of the 576 rushing yards and 10 touchdowns in the season opener as the highest single-game totals in NCAA Division I in 2013. McKinnon was involved in 12 of the Eagles' longest plays of 2013, including the top three (two rushes of 66 yards, one 63-yard touchdown rush) and scored the first touchdown in six of the 10 games in which he played. McKinnon was honored as the Iron Works Dedication Award winner for the third time and second-straight year. Following his senior season, McKinnon was invited to the prestigious Reese's Senior Bowl.

== Professional career ==
=== Pre-draft ===
External videos
- McKinnon's NFL Combine workout

Pre-draft measurables
Height	Weight	Arm length	Hand span	Wingspan	40-yard dash	10-yard split	20-yard split	20-yard shuttle	Three-cone drill	Vertical jump	Broad jump	Bench press	Wonderlic
5 ft 8 7/8 in (1.75 m)	209 lb (95 kg)	30 1/4 in (0.77 m)	8 5/8 in (0.22 m)	6 ft 0 5/8 in (1.84 m)	4.41 s	1.55 s	2.57 s	4.12 s	6.83 s	40.5 in (1.03 m)	11 ft 0 in (3.35 m)	32 reps	24
All values from NFL Combine

McKinnon was invited to the 2014 NFL Scouting Combine, where he improved his stock by running unofficial times of 4.38 and 4.35 in the 40-yard dash (4.41 official, 2nd fastest among running backs) while leading all running backs in bench press reps with 32. McKinnon also showcased his athletic ability with a broad jump of 11 ft 0 in (3.35 m) and a vertical leap of 40.5 in (1.03 m). Only four players at the NFL Combine topped McKinnon's 40.5-inch vertical jump, while his three-cone drill mark of 6.83 seconds and short-shuttle clocking of 4.12 seconds were also some of the best marks in the running back group. McKinnon's 32 bench press reps are the most among current NFL running backs at the NFL Scouting Combine.

=== Minnesota Vikings ===
==== 2014 season ====
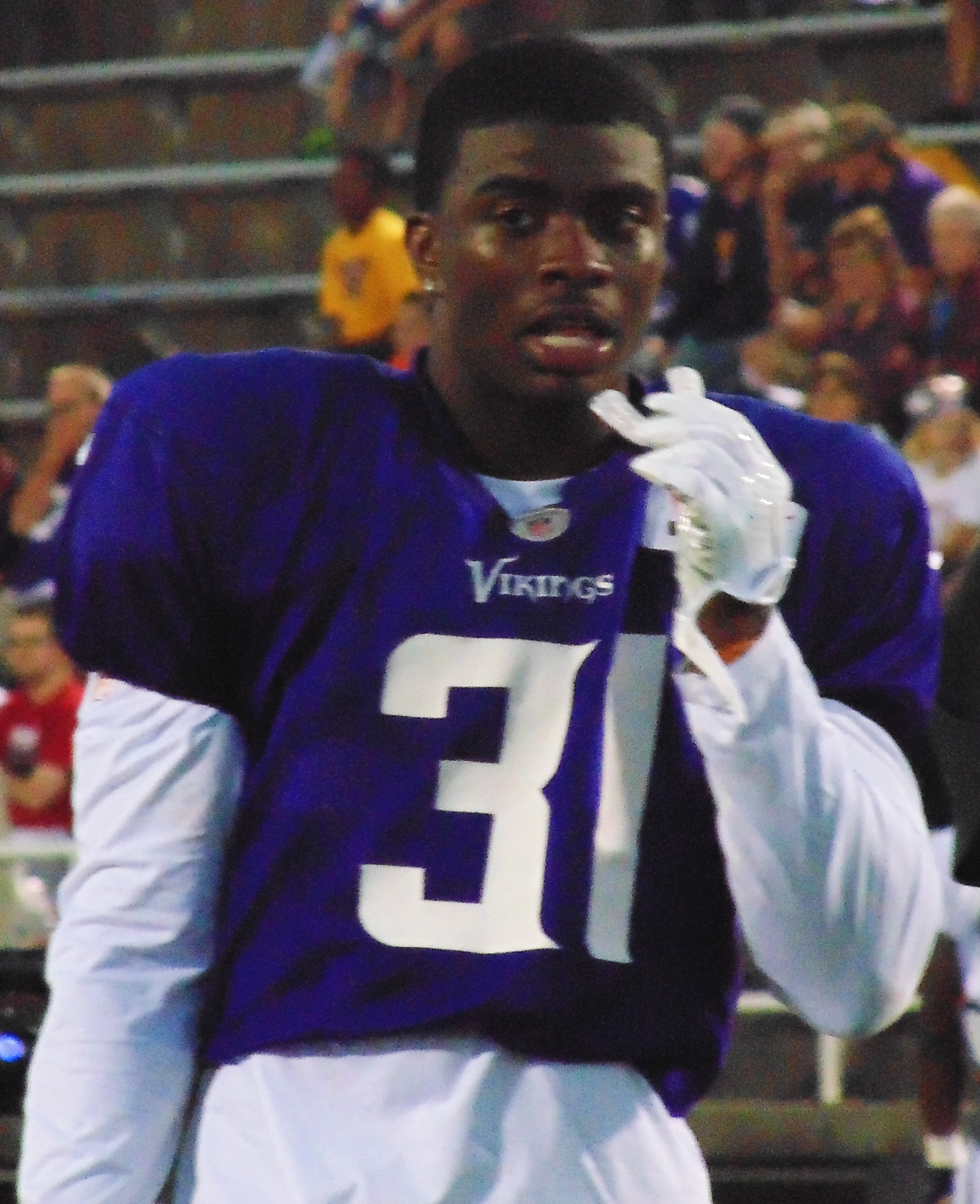
McKinnon in 2014

McKinnon was selected in the third round (96th overall) by the Minnesota Vikings in the 2014 NFL draft. He was the seventh running back to be selected that year. The pick was obtained as part of the Percy Harvin trade to Seattle in 2013.

As a rookie, McKinnon led the Vikings with a 4.8 yard per carry average and ranked second on the team in rushing yards despite only playing in 11 games with six starts. In the season opener against the St. Louis Rams, he caught his first NFL pass from Matt Cassel, which went for one yard. McKinnon recorded a pair of 100-yard games on the season, with the first of them coming in Week 4 against the Atlanta Falcons with 135 yards rushing on 18 carries with a long of 55, which was the fifth-longest run by a rookie running back in the NFL in 2014. He became the first Vikings rookie to break the 100-yard mark since Adrian Peterson did it back in 2007. The second of them came against the Buffalo Bills' No. 1-ranked rush defense in Week 7 (103 yards on 19 attempts).

McKinnon started his first career game against the Detroit Lions in Week 6, joining fellow rookie quarterback Teddy Bridgewater as the first quarterback/running back rookie starting tandem since 1961 for the Vikings when Fran Tarkenton and Tommy Mason opened the Detroit game in 1961. McKinnon finished the 17–3 loss with 11 carries for 40 yards and six receptions for 42 yards. He missed the game against the Carolina Panthers on November 30 and his promising rookie campaign ended when he was placed on injured reserve six days later.

McKinnon finished his rookie year with 113 carries for 538 yards and 27 receptions for 135 yards in 11 games and six starts.

==== 2015 season ====
In 2015, McKinnon led the team for the second straight season in yards per carry with a 5.2 average and logged a career-high three total touchdowns. During a Week 15 38–17 victory over the Chicago Bears, which was McKinnon's 25th game as a pro, he stepped in after Peterson left the game due to an injury and responded with seven carries for 10 yards and a career-high four receptions for 76 yards, including his first NFL touchdown on a 17-yard reception. McKinnon had his first career multi-touchdown game against the New York Giants the following week, rushing for a seven-yard touchdown and a career-long 68-yard touchdown to solidify a playoff-clinching 49–17 victory for the Vikings. In the regular season finale against the Green Bay Packers, McKinnon had a team-leading three receptions for 33 yards, four carries for 15 yards, a special teams tackle, and returned a kick for 24 yards as the Vikings clinched the NFC North with a 20–13 road victory.

McKinnon finished his second professional season with 52 carries for 271 yards and two touchdowns to go along with 21 receptions for 173 yards and a touchdown in 16 games and no starts. During the Wild Card Round against the Seattle Seahawks, he had two carries for seven yards and three receptions for 22 yards in the narrow 10–9 loss.

==== 2016 season ====
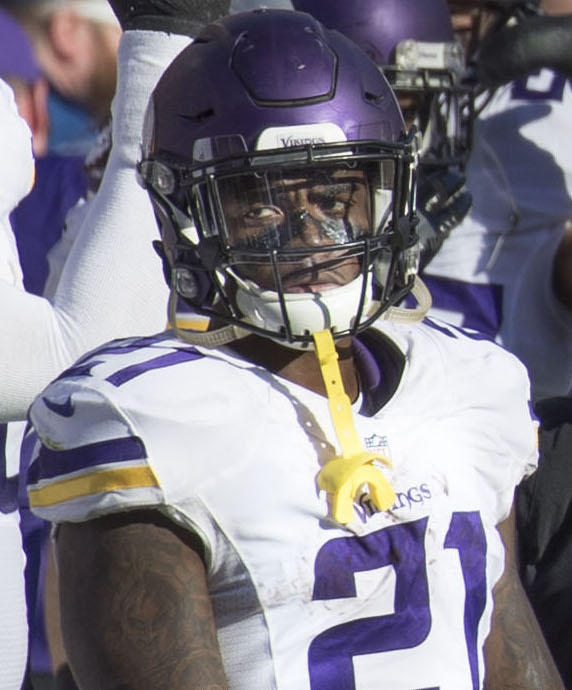
McKinnon in 2016

During Week 2, Adrian Peterson tore the meniscus in his right knee in a Sunday Night Football game against the Packers in U.S. Bank Stadium, and after being placed on injured reserve, the Vikings announced McKinnon as the starter for the Week 3 matchup against the Panthers. Prior to the game, the team named Matt Asiata the starter, but McKinnon ended up leading the rushing attack with 45 yards on 16 carries and a two-point conversion. During a Week 4 24–10 victory over the Giants, McKinnon earned his first start of the season and rushed 18 times for 85 yards and a touchdown, helping the team rush for a season-high 104 yards.

McKinnon finished the 2016 season with 159 carries for 539 yards and two touchdowns to go along with 43 receptions for 255 yards and two touchdowns in 15 games and seven starts.

==== 2017 season ====
McKinnon entered the 2017 season second on the depth chart behind rookie Dalvin Cook. After Cook tore his ACL in a Week 4 14–7 loss against the Lions, McKinnon remained second on the depth chart after being surpassed by Latavius Murray. During Week 5 against the Bears, McKinnon had a season-high 95 rushing yards and a rushing touchdown in the 20–17 road victory. During a Week 15 34–7 victory over the Cincinnati Bengals, he had seven receptions for 114 yards to go along with 24 rushing yards.

McKinnon finished the 2017 regular-season with 150 carries for a career-high 570 yards and three touchdowns to go along with 51 receptions for 421 yards and two touchdowns in 16 games and one start. The Vikings made the playoffs and earned a first-round bye with the #2-seed. In the Divisional Round against the New Orleans Saints, McKinnon rushed for 34 yards and a touchdown while also catching three receptions for six yards during a miraculous 29–24 victory. During the NFC Championship Game against the Philadelphia Eagles, he had 40 rushing yards to go along with 11 receptions for 86 yards in the 38–7 road loss.

=== San Francisco 49ers ===
On March 14, 2018, McKinnon signed a four-year, $30 million contract with the San Francisco 49ers. On September 1, he tore his ACL during a team workout, ending his season before it even started. McKinnon was placed on injured reserve two days later.

McKinnon suffered a setback from his knee surgery during training camp and was placed on season-ending injured reserve on August 31, 2019. Without McKinnon, the 49ers reached Super Bowl LIV, but lost 31–20 to the Kansas City Chiefs.

McKinnon made his return to the NFL in Week 1 of the 2020 season against the Arizona Cardinals. He had three carries for 24 yards to go along with three receptions for 20 yards and a touchdown in the 24–20 loss. During Week 2 against the New York Jets, McKinnon had a 55-yard run on a 3rd-and-31 situation. Overall, he finished the 31–13 road victory with three carries for 77 yards (25.7 yards per carry) and a touchdown as the 49ers. McKinnon scored a touchdown in the following two games to give him four consecutive games with a touchdown to start the season. He finished the 2020 season with 81 carries for 319 yards and five touchdowns to go along with 33 receptions for 253 yards and a touchdown in 16 games and four starts.

=== Kansas City Chiefs ===
==== 2021 season ====
McKinnon signed a one-year contract with the Kansas City Chiefs on April 30, 2021. He was placed on injured reserve with a hamstring injury on November 30. McKinnon was activated on January 1, 2022. In the regular season finale against the Denver Broncos, he scored his first touchdown with the Chiefs during the 28–24 victory.

McKinnon finished the 2021 season with 12 carries for 62 yards to go along with 13 receptions for 107 yards and a touchdown in 13 games and no starts. During the Wild Card Round against the Pittsburgh Steelers, McKinnon scored a receiving touchdown as part of a 142-scrimmage yard day in the 42–21 victory.

==== 2022 season ====
McKinnon re-signed with the team on June 14, 2022.

During Week 14 against the Broncos, McKinnon had seven receptions for 112 yards and two touchdowns in the 34–28 victory. Three weeks later against the Broncos, he set an NFL record with five consecutive games with receiving touchdowns, a feat never before accomplished by a running back. McKinnon increased the streak to six games in the regular season finale against the Las Vegas Raiders.

McKinnon finished the 2022 season with 72 carries for 291 yards and a touchdown to go along with 56 receptions for 512 yards and nine touchdowns in 17 games and no starts. His nine receiving touchdowns led the league for receiving touchdowns among running backs. McKinnon also set a franchise record for most receiving touchdowns by a running back in a season.

McKinnon later helped the Chiefs win Super Bowl LVII over the Eagles. In the game, McKinnon caught three passes for 15 yards and rushed four times for 34 yards, including a crucial play in which he gave himself up short of the goal line following a nine-yard gain on Kansas City's final drive—allowing the Chiefs to run an additional minute-plus off the clock and kick the game-winning field goal with eight seconds left.

==== 2023 season ====
McKinnon re-signed with the Chiefs on May 2, 2023. On December 24, he was placed on injured reserve, ending his regular season.

McKinnon finished the 2023 season with 21 carries for 60 yards and a touchdown to go along with 25 receptions for 192 yards and four touchdowns in 12 games and no starts. He was activated on February 10, 2024, in time for Super Bowl LVIII. During the Super Bowl, McKinnon caught two passes for 15 yards in the Chiefs overtime victory against McKinnon's former team, the San Francisco 49ers.

== NFL career statistics ==
Legend
	Won the Super Bowl
**Bold**	Career high

=== Regular season ===
Year	Team	Games		Rushing					Receiving					Fumbles	
Year	Team	GP	GS	Att	Yds	Avg	Lng	TD	Rec	Yds	Avg	Lng	TD	Fum	Lost
2014	MIN	11	6	113	538	4.8	55	0	27	135	5.0	17	0	0	0
2015	MIN	16	0	52	271	**5.2**	**68**	2	21	173	8.2	30	1	0	0
2016	MIN	15	7	**159**	539	3.4	36	2	43	255	5.9	41	2	0	0
2017	MIN	16	1	150	**570**	3.8	58	3	51	421	8.3	41	2	**3**	**2**
2018	SF	Did not play due to injury													
2019	SF	Did not play due to injury													
2020	SF	16	4	81	319	3.9	55	**5**	33	253	7.7	26	1	0	0
2021	KC	13	0	12	62	**5.2**	18	0	13	107	8.2	14	1	0	0
2022	KC	17	0	72	291	4.0	30	1	**56**	**512**	**9.1**	**56**	**9**	1	1
2023	KC	12	0	21	60	2.9	10	1	25	192	7.7	27	4	0	0
Total		116	18	660	2,650	4.0	68	14	269	2,048	7.6	56	20	4	3

=== Postseason ===
Year	Team	Games		Rushing					Receiving					Fumbles	
Year	Team	GP	GS	Att	Yds	Avg	Lng	TD	Rec	Yds	Avg	Lng	TD	Fum	Lost
2015	MIN	1	0	2	7	3.5	6	0	3	22	7.3	9	0	0	0
2017	MIN	2	0	18	74	4.1	14	**1**	**14**	92	6.6	13	0	0	0
2019	SF	Did not play due to injury													
2021	KC	3	3	**34**	**150**	**4.4**	**15**	0	**14**	**165**	**11.8**	**23**	**1**	**1**	0
2022	KC	3	0	19	60	3.2	14	0	5	32	6.4	13	0	0	0
2023	KC	1	0	0	0	0.0	0	0	2	15	7.5	8	0	0	0
Total		10	3	73	291	4.0	15	1	38	326	8.6	23	1	1	0
