= Kai Forbath =

American football player (born 1987)

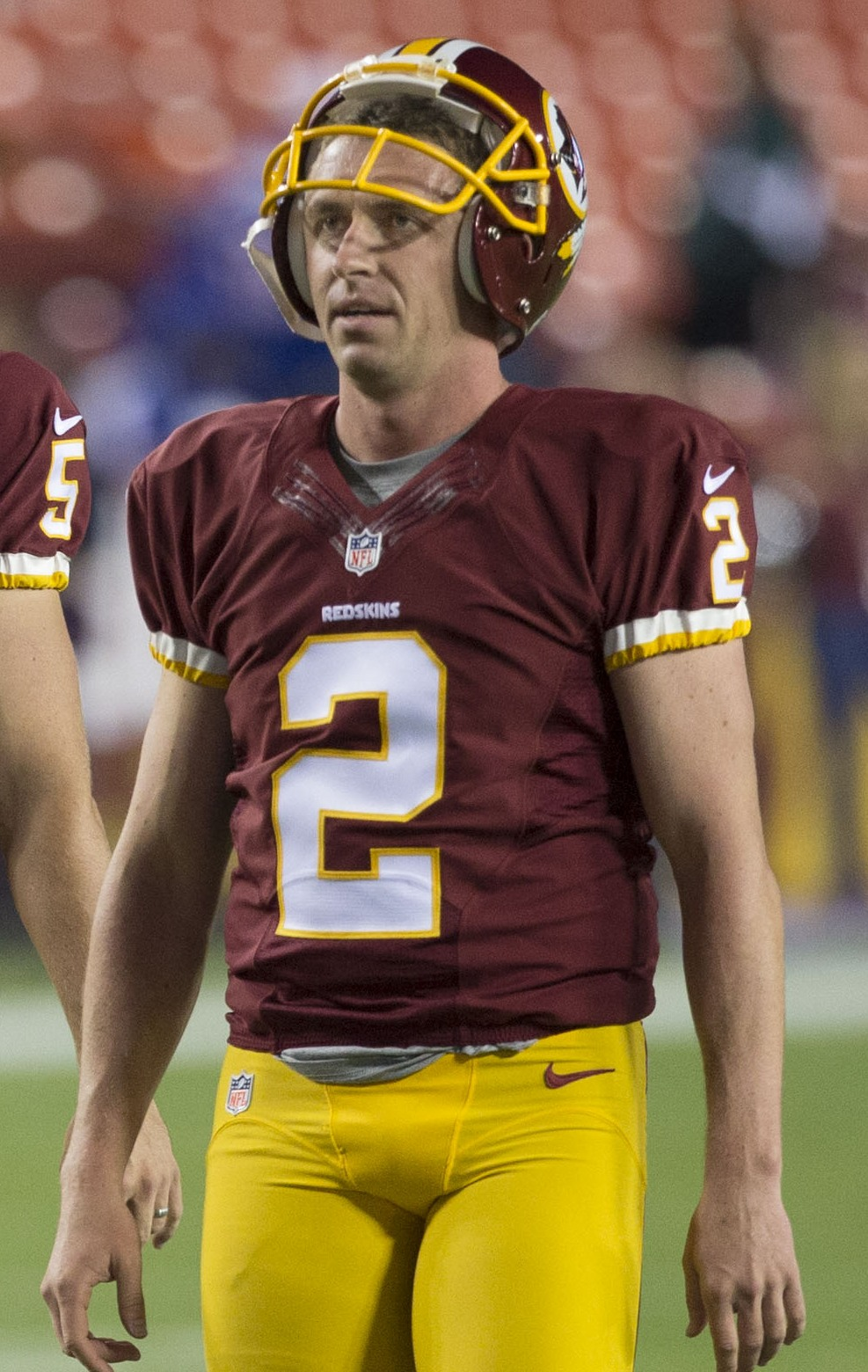
- Forbath with the Washington Redskins in 2014

No. 2, 5, 3
- Position: Placekicker

Personal information
- Born: September 2, 1987 (age 39); Santa Monica, California, U.S.
- Listed height: 5 ft 11 in (1.80 m)
- Listed weight: 197 lb (89 kg)

Career information
- High school: Notre Dame (Sherman Oaks, California)
- College: UCLA (2006–2010)
- NFL draft: 2011: undrafted

Career history
- Dallas Cowboys (2011); Tampa Bay Buccaneers (2012)*; Washington Redskins (2012–2015); New Orleans Saints (2015); Minnesota Vikings (2016–2017); Jacksonville Jaguars (2018); New England Patriots (2019); Dallas Cowboys (2019); Carolina Panthers (2020)*; Chicago Bears (2020)*; Los Angeles Rams (2020)
- * Offseason or practice squad member only

Awards and highlights
- Lou Groza Award (2009); Consensus All-American (2009); Third-team All-American (2008); First-team All-Pac-10 (2009); 2× Second-team All-Pac-10 (2008, 2010)

Career NFL statistics
- Field goals made: 133
- Field goals attempted: 154
- Field goal percentage: 86.4%
- Longest field goal: 57
- Extra points made: 187
- Extra points attempted: 200
- Extra point percentage: 93.5%
- Points scored: 586
- Stats at Pro Football Reference

Kai August Forbath (born September 2, 1987) is an American former professional football player who was a placekicker in the National Football League (NFL). He played college football for the UCLA Bruins, earning consensus All-American honors and winning the Lou Groza Award in 2009. Forbath signed with the Dallas Cowboys as an undrafted free agent in 2011. He was also a member of the Tampa Bay Buccaneers, Washington Redskins, New Orleans Saints, Minnesota Vikings, Jacksonville Jaguars, New England Patriots, Carolina Panthers, and Los Angeles Rams.

== Early life ==
Forbath was born in Santa Monica, California. He attended Notre Dame High School in Sherman Oaks. During his last two prep seasons, Forbath converted 26-of-33 field goal attempts and scored 213 total points, with a long field goal of 57 yards. He also forced touchbacks on 150 of 188 kickoffs and made 134-of-135 extra point attempts. Forbath also served as the team's punter and had a punting average of 46 yards that led to him being named to the Los Angeles Times' All-Star team at punter. Forbath subsequently earned high school All-American recognition by USA Today. In addition to football, Forbath also played soccer in the West Valley Samba Soccer League (National Premier Soccer League). Following his senior season, Forbath was invited to play in the 2006 U.S. Army All-American Bowl and the CaliFlorida Bowl.

Considered a three-star recruit by Rivals.com, Forbath was listed as the No. 1 placekicker in the nation among the class of 2006. He picked UCLA over California, Notre Dame, Oregon, among others.

== College career ==
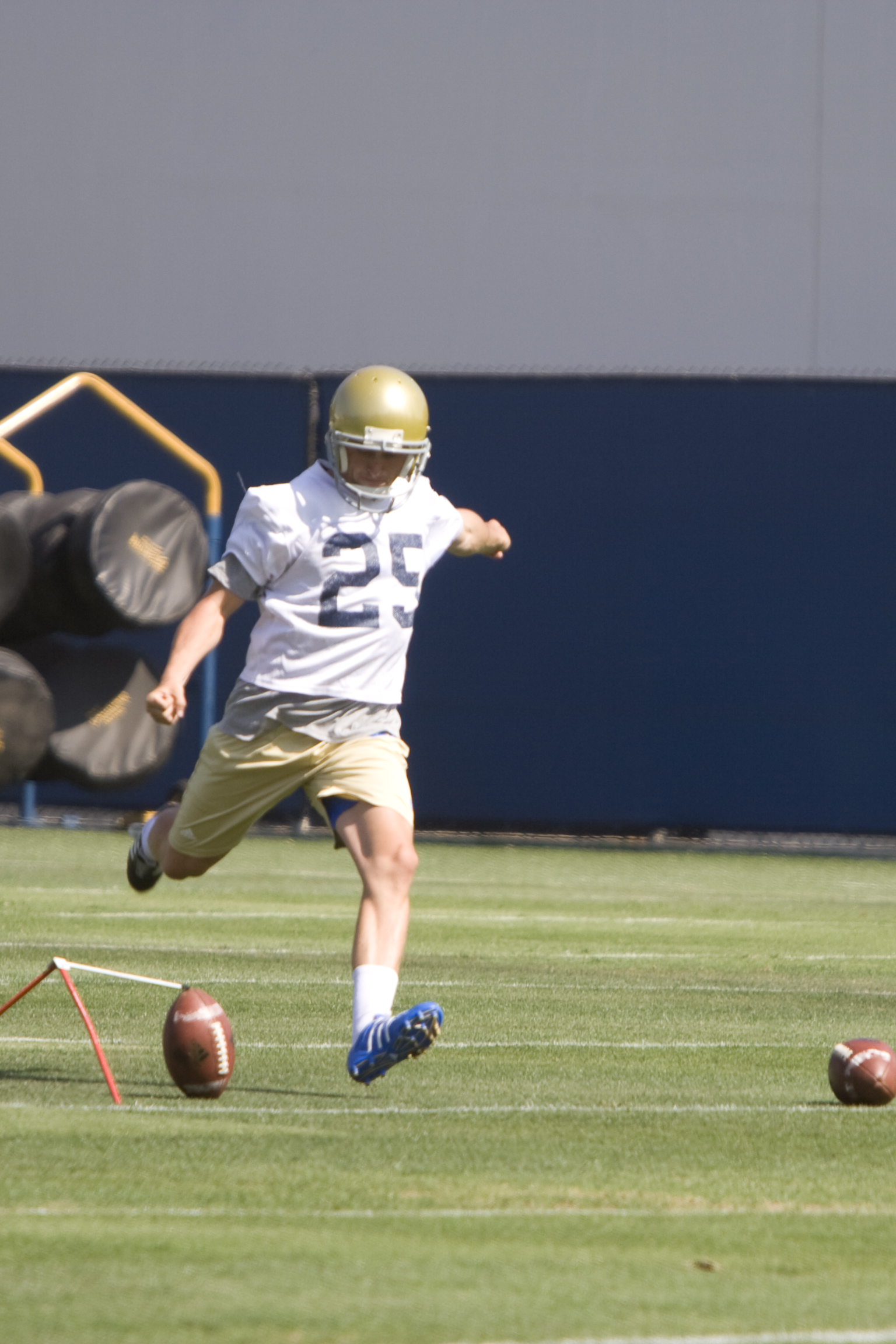
Forbath at UCLA in 2009

Forbath attended the University of California, Los Angeles, where he played for the Bruins football team from 2006 to 2010.

After redshirting his initial year at UCLA, Forbath made 25 of 30 field goals and all 30 points after touchdowns (PATs) for a team-high 105 points in 2007. He became the first UCLA player to record five field goals of at least 50 yards in a season, including a freshman-best 54-yarder versus Oregon.

As a sophomore, Forbath received first-team All-Pacific-10 honors after making 19 of 22 field goals on the season, including his last 13 straight.

As a junior, Forbath made 28-of-31 field goals (90.3%) and 24-of-25 extra points (96%). He connected on another three field goals from 50 yards or more and had then made 9-of-12 field goals from that distance. Competing with Leigh Tiffin of Alabama and Blair Walsh of Georgia, Forbath was named the winner of the 2009 Lou Groza Award, recognizing the best placekicker in college football. He was named as a Consensus All-American.

As a senior, Forbath made 13-of-18 field goals (72.2%) and 27-of-27 extra points (100%). On September 25, 2010, he kicked two field goals in leading the Bruins to an upset victory over the #7 Texas Longhorns 34–12 in front of a stadium-record 101,437 fans in Austin, Texas. The previous week, Forbath kicked a 42-yard field goal in the third quarter to give the Bruins a 24–3 lead in the game against then-#23 Houston. UCLA defeated Houston by a score of 31–13. On November 6, 2010, Forbath kicked a game winning 51-yard field goal in the last second of the game to give the Bruins a 17–14 victory over Oregon State, and he was named Pac-10 Conference Special Team Player-of-the-Week.

At the time, Forbath finished his college career with an 84.2 career percentage (second in school history), 85 career field goals (tied for first in school history), 357 career points (second in school history), tied for most career games with at least two field goals (27) in NCAA history and tied for most career games with at least three field goals (13) in NCAA history.

== Professional career ==
Pre-draft measurables
| Height | Weight | Arm length | Hand span |
|---|---|---|---|
| 5 ft 10 7/8 in (1.80 m) | 197 lb (89 kg) | 30 3/4 in (0.78 m) | 9 1/4 in (0.23 m) |
All values from NFL Combine

=== Dallas Cowboys (first stint) ===
Although he was projected as the second-best kicker in the 2011 NFL draft, Forbath was not selected. On August 2, 2011, he was signed by the Dallas Cowboys as an undrafted free agent, but because Forbath had a pre-existing quad injury that did not allow him to practice and that would take a lengthy time to heal, Forbath was immediately placed on the active non-football injury list. At the time, the Cowboys had an open competition for the placekicker job and were covering themselves in case a player did not emerge from the four kickers they had in training camp at one time.

On August 30, Forbath was placed on the Non-Football Injury list, so he would not count towards the first 80-player cut and later towards the 53-player limit. The performance of fellow rookie Dan Bailey made the Cowboys decide to keep Forbath on the NFI list for the entire regular season.

On April 16, 2012, Forbath was waived by the Cowboys, having never participated in a practice with the team.

=== Tampa Bay Buccaneers ===
The Tampa Bay Buccaneers claimed Forbath off waivers on April 17, 2012. During the preseason, Forbath made all five field goal attempts, including a successful 55-yard kick.

=== Washington Redskins ===
The Washington Redskins signed Forbath on October 9, 2012, replacing Billy Cundiff. Forbath made his NFL and Washington debut knocking through a 50-yard attempt as his first career NFL field goal in the home game against the Minnesota Vikings in Week 6 on October 14, 2012. His performance was essential in Washington's victory over the Baltimore Ravens in Week 14, where he recorded 48-yard and 49-yard field goals and then converted a game-winning 34-yard field goal in overtime.

On December 23, 2012, in Week 16, Forbath set the NFL record for consecutive field goals to begin a career with 17 in a row, beating Garrett Hartley, who previously held the record at 16. The football was sent to the Pro Football Hall of Fame. In the 2012 season, he finished converting 33 of 34 extra point attempts and 17 of 18 field goal attempts.

In the 2013 season, Forbath converted all 26 extra point attempts and 18 of 22 field goal attempts in 13 games.

On October 19, 2014, in Week 7, Forbath scored the game-winning field goal in the 19–17 win over the Tennessee Titans. He was named NFC Special Teams Player of the Week after scoring the overtime winning field goal against the Dallas Cowboys the following week. He once again scored the game-winning field goal in the 27–24 Week 16 victory over the Philadelphia Eagles. In the 2014 season, Forbath finished converting 31 of 32 extra point attempts and 24 of 27 field goal attempts.

Washington offered Forbath a $1,542,000 right of first refusal tender on March 8, 2015, which he signed on April 15. Forbath was released by the team on September 14.

Forbath finished his career with Washington as the second-most accurate kicker in team history, converting 87.0 percent of his field goal attempts (60-of-69). His mark of 60 field goals and 91 extra points rank fifth in franchise history.

=== New Orleans Saints ===
The New Orleans Saints signed Forbath on October 19, 2015, to replace a struggling Zach Hocker, who was released by the team.

Forbath played in first career game as a member of the Saints in Week 7 against the Indianapolis Colts on October 25, 2015, converting on three-of-four extra point attempts in the 27–21 victory. On November 1, in Week 8, Forbath ended a record-breaking 52–49 shootout against the New York Giants at the Mercedes-Benz Superdome with a 50-yard field goal as time expired. On November 29, in Week 12, he kicked a career-long 57-yard field goal against the Houston Texans, which is the third-longest in team history. On January 3, 2016, Forbath kicked a 30-yard game-winning field goal in the regular season finale in Week 17 against the Atlanta Falcons as time expired, his sixth career game-winner. Forbath finished the 2015 season converting 34 of 35 extra point attempts and 10 of 15 field goal attempts.

On March 10, 2016, the Saints re-signed Forbath. Throughout the team's 2016 preseason, Forbath competed with Connor Barth, and the Saints ultimately kept Forbath while cutting Barth. However, a few days later, on September 6, the Saints also released Forbath in favor of an undrafted rookie kicker Wil Lutz, who had gone through training camp with the Baltimore Ravens.

=== Minnesota Vikings ===
On November 16, 2016, the Minnesota Vikings signed Forbath to a one-year, $760,000 contract after releasing incumbent kicker Blair Walsh. In Forbath's first game with the Vikings, he converted one field goal and three extra points against the Arizona Cardinals. Three weeks later, Forbath kicked a season-high four field goals against the Jacksonville Jaguars. He finished his first season with the Vikings converting all 15 field goal attempts and 11 of 14 extra point attempts.

On October 9, 2017, Forbath kicked two field goals, including the game-winner against the Chicago Bears. During Week 7, he converted six field goals, including a 52-yarder, in a 24–16 win over the Ravens, earning NFC Special Teams Player of the Week honors. Forbath is one of three Vikings' kickers to kick six field goals in a game; the last time this happened was in 1998 (Gary Anderson). On October 29, Forbath kicked four field goals against the Cleveland Browns. In the 2017 season, he converted 34 of 39 extra point attempts and 32 of 38 field goal attempts. On January 14, 2018, Forbath kicked three field goals against the New Orleans Saints in the NFC Divisional Round.

On March 20, 2018, Forbath re-signed with the Vikings. However, the team traded up to draft Auburn kicker Daniel Carlson the next month. On August 20, Forbath was released by the Vikings after losing the starting job to Carlson.

=== Jacksonville Jaguars ===
On December 14, 2018, Forbath was signed by the Jacksonville Jaguars as insurance for the injured Josh Lambo. He was released on February 19, 2019, after playing three games for the Jaguars, making four out of his five field goal attempts.

=== New England Patriots ===
On November 29, 2019, the New England Patriots signed Forbath after the team released Nick Folk, who had undergone an emergency appendectomy. Forbath became the fourth placekicker on the Patriots' active roster in the 2019 season, after longtime kicker Stephen Gostkowski was placed on injured reserve after Week 4, original replacement Mike Nugent was released after four games, and Folk. He made his Patriots debut on December 1, in a Week 13 matchup against the Houston Texans handling only field goals and extra points (punter Jake Bailey handled kick-off duties) and went 1-for-2 on extra points and made a 23-yard field goal in the 28–22 road loss. The Patriots waived Forbath the day after the game.

=== Dallas Cowboys (second stint) ===
On December 9, 2019, Forbath was signed by the Dallas Cowboys after the team released Brett Maher. He helped to stabilize the placekicker position and didn't miss a kick for the rest of the season, making 10-of-10 field goals and 10-of-10 extra points.

On March 24, 2020, Forbath re-signed with the Cowboys. He was released on August 1, without having a chance to compete for the kicking job against Greg Zuerlein.

=== Carolina Panthers ===
On September 19, 2020, Forbath was signed to the Carolina Panthers practice squad, and was released two days later. He was re-signed to the practice squad on September 25 and released again three days later.

=== Chicago Bears ===
On October 9, 2020, Forbath was signed to the Chicago Bears practice squad.

=== Los Angeles Rams ===
On October 20, 2020, Forbath was signed by the Los Angeles Rams off the Bears practice squad. He suffered an ankle injury in Week 10 and was placed on injured reserve on November 17. Forbath was not retained after the Rams signed kicker Matt Gay off the Colts' practice squad. In his time with the Rams, Forbath converted four of five extra point attempts and two of three field goal attempts.

== NFL career statistics ==
Legend
| | Led the league |
| **Bold** | Career high |

=== Regular season ===
| Year | Team | GP | Overall FGs | | | | | PATs | | | | Points |
| Year | Team | GP | Blk | Lng | FGM | FGA | Pct | XPM | XPA | Pct | Blk | Points |
|---|---|---|---|---|---|---|---|---|---|---|---|---|
| 2012 | WAS | 11 | 0 | 50 | 17 | 18 | 94.4 | 33 | 34 | 97.1 | 1 | 84 |
| 2013 | WAS | 13 | **2** | 50 | 18 | 22 | 81.8 | 26 | 26 | **100.0** | 0 | 80 |
| 2014 | WAS | **16** | 0 | 49 | 24 | 27 | 88.9 | 31 | 32 | 96.9 | 1 | 103 |
| 2015 | WAS | 1 | 0 | 45 | 1 | 2 | 50.0 | 1 | 1 | **100.0** | 0 | 4 |
| 2015 | NO | 10 | **2** | **57** | 9 | 13 | 69.2 | 33 | 34 | 97.1 | 0 | 60 |
| 2016 | MIN | 7 | 0 | 51 | 15 | 15 | **100.0** | 11 | 14 | 78.6 | 1 | 56 |
| 2017 | MIN | **16** | 1 | 53 | **32** | **38** | 84.2 | **34** | **39** | 87.2 | **2** | **130** |
| 2018 | JAX | 3 | 0 | 41 | 4 | 5 | 80.0 | 3 | 3 | **100.0** | 0 | 15 |
| 2019 | NE | 1 | 0 | 23 | 1 | 1 | **100.0** | 1 | 2 | 50.0 | 0 | 4 |
| 2019 | DAL | 3 | 0 | 50 | 10 | 10 | **100.0** | 10 | 10 | **100.0** | 0 | 40 |
| 2020 | LAR | 2 | 0 | 23 | 2 | 3 | 66.7 | 4 | 5 | 80.0 | 0 | 10 |
| Total | | 83 | 5 | 57 | 133 | 155 | 86.4 | 187 | 200 | 93.5 | 5 | 586 |

=== Postseason ===
| Year | Team | GP | Overall FGs | | | | | PATs | | | | Points |
| Year | Team | GP | Blk | Lng | FGM | FGA | Pct | XPM | XPA | Pct | Blk | Points |
|---|---|---|---|---|---|---|---|---|---|---|---|---|
| 2012 | WAS | 1 | 0 | 0 | 0 | 0 | - | 2 | 2 | **100.0** | 0 | 2 |
| 2017 | MIN | **2** | 0 | **53** | **3** | **4** | **75.0** | **3** | **3** | **100.0** | 0 | **12** |
| Total | | 3 | 5 | 53 | 3 | 4 | 75.0 | 5 | 5 | 100.0 | 5 | 14 |
