= Sterling Bailey =

American football player (born 1992)

No. 67, 94, 95, 70, 79, 71
- Position: Defensive end

Personal information
- Born: September 13, 1992 (age 34); Gainesville, Georgia, U.S.
- Listed height: 6 ft 3 in (1.91 m)
- Listed weight: 275 lb (125 kg)

Career information
- High school: Gainesville (GA) East Hall
- College: Georgia
- NFL draft: 2016: undrafted

Career history
- Indianapolis Colts (2016)*; Seattle Seahawks (2016)*; Minnesota Vikings (2016–2017)*; Tampa Bay Buccaneers (2017)*; Carolina Panthers (2018)*; Baltimore Brigade (2019)*; Arizona Cardinals (2019)*
- * Offseason or practice squad member only
- Stats at Pro Football Reference

Sterling Eugene Bailey (born September 13, 1992) is an American former professional football defensive end. He played college football at Georgia. Bailey was signed by the Indianapolis Colts as an undrafted free agent in 2016. He was also a member of the Seattle Seahawks, Minnesota Vikings, Tampa Bay Buccaneers, Carolina Panthers, and Arizona Cardinals.

== Professional career ==
Pre-draft measurables
Height	Weight	Arm length	Hand span	40-yard dash	10-yard split	20-yard split	20-yard shuttle	Three-cone drill	Vertical jump	Broad jump	Bench press
6 ft 4 in (1.93 m)	285 lb (129 kg)	33 3/8 in (0.85 m)	10 1/4 in (0.26 m)	5.03 s	1.72 s	2.87 s	4.64 s	7.39 s	30.5 in (0.77 m)	9 ft 3 in (2.82 m)	20 reps
All values from NFL Combine/Pro Day

=== Indianapolis Colts ===
After going undrafted in the 2016 NFL draft, Bailey signed with the Indianapolis Colts on May 2, 2016. On September 3, 2016, he was waived by the Colts during final team cuts. Bailey was signed to the Colts' practice squad the following day. On September 26, 2016, he was released from the Colts' practice squad.

=== Seattle Seahawks ===
On October 4, 2016, Bailey was signed to the Seattle Seahawks' practice squad. He was released from the Seahawks' practice squad on October 18, 2016.

=== Minnesota Vikings ===
Bailey was signed to the Minnesota Vikings' practice squad on October 25, 2016. He signed a reserve/future contract with the Vikings on January 2, 2017. On May 4, 2017, he was waived by the Vikings.

=== Tampa Bay Buccaneers ===
On May 31, 2017, Bailey was signed by the Tampa Bay Buccaneers. He was waived on September 2, 2017, and was signed to the Buccaneers' practice squad the next day. He was released on September 14, 2017. He was re-signed on December 5, 2017.

=== Carolina Panthers ===
On August 7, 2018, Bailey signed with the Carolina Panthers. He was waived on August 31, 2018.

=== Arizona Cardinals ===
On July 20, 2019, Bailey was signed by the Arizona Cardinals. He was released on August 31, 2019.
