= Mitch Mathews =

American football player (born 1991)

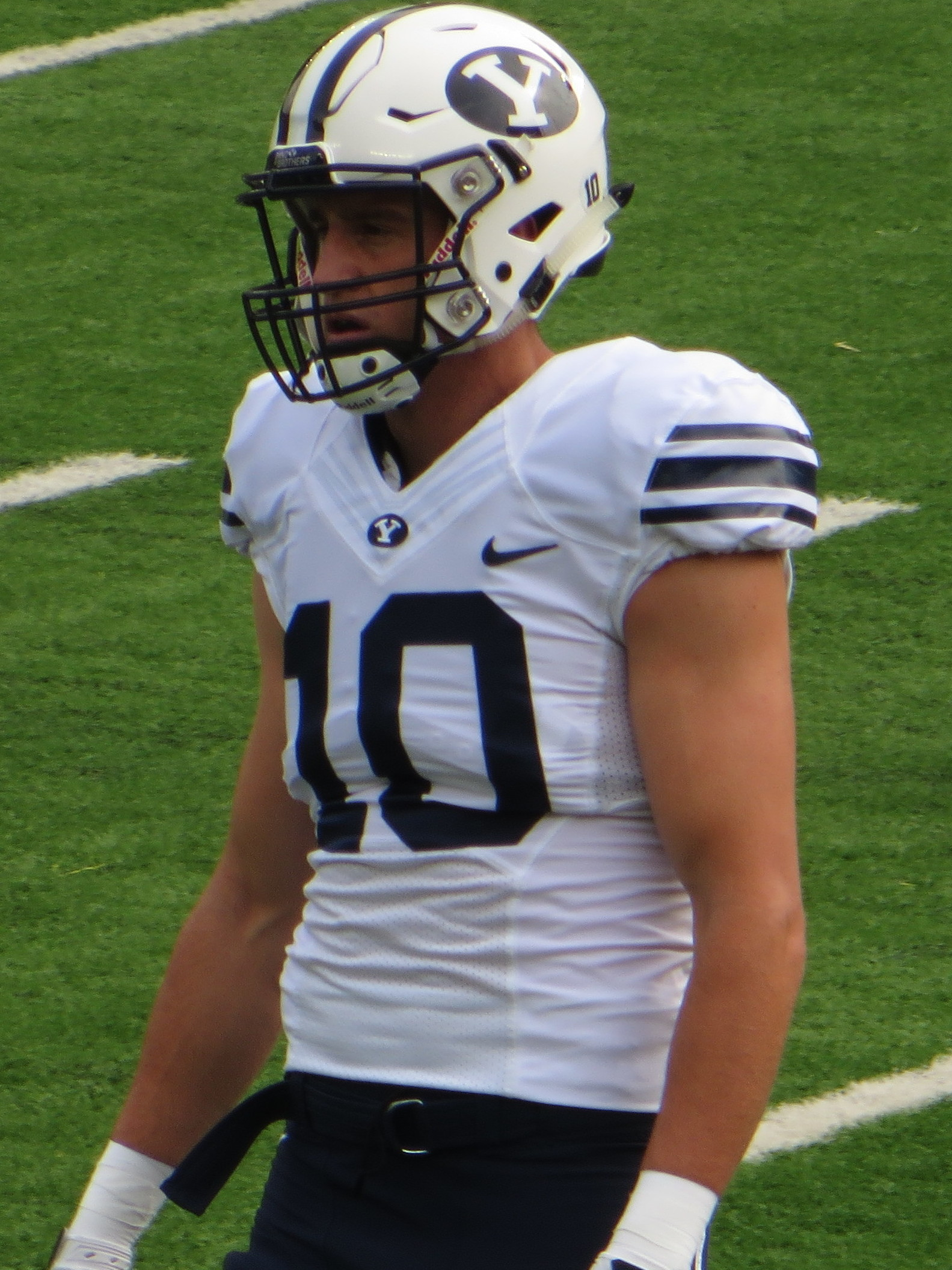
- Mathews in 2015

No. 10
- Position: Wide receiver

Personal information
- Born: April 15, 1991 (age 35); Beaverton, Oregon, U.S.
- Listed height: 6 ft 5 in (1.96 m)
- Listed weight: 215 lb (98 kg)

Career information
- High school: Beaverton (OR) Southridge
- College: BYU
- NFL draft: 2016: undrafted

Career history
- Kansas City Chiefs (2016)*; Cleveland Browns (2016)*; Minnesota Vikings (2017)*; Miami Dolphins (2017)*
- * Offseason or practice squad member only

Mitch Mathews (born April 15, 1991) is an American former football wide receiver. He was signed by the Kansas City Chiefs as an undrafted free agent following the 2016 NFL draft. He played college football at Brigham Young University from 2009 to 2015. He also served a two-year mission for The Church of Jesus Christ of Latter-day Saints in Orlando, Florida from 2009 to 2011.

== College statistics ==
			Receiving		
Year	Team	GP	Rec	Yards	TDs
2012	BYU	6	2	27	0
2013	BYU	9	26	397	4
2014	BYU	13	73	922	9
2015	BYU	13	54	737	11
College totals		41	152	2,083	24

== Professional career ==
=== Kansas City Chiefs ===
Mathews was signed by the Kansas City Chiefs on May 2, 2016, as an undrafted free agent. On August 30, 2016, Mathews was waived by the Chiefs.

=== Cleveland Browns ===
On October 11, 2016, Mathews was signed to the Browns' practice squad. He was released by the Browns on November 2, 2016.

=== Minnesota Vikings ===
On March 30, 2017, Mathews was signed by the Minnesota Vikings. He was waived on May 30, 2017.

=== Miami Dolphins ===
On June 8, 2017, Mathews was signed by the Miami Dolphins. He was waived on September 2, 2017.
