= Horace Richardson (American football) =

American football player (born 1993)

No. 27
- Position: Cornerback

Personal information
- Born: September 28, 1993 (age 33); Everman, Texas, U.S.
- Listed height: 6 ft 0 in (1.83 m)
- Listed weight: 190 lb (86 kg)

Career information
- High school: Everman (TX)
- College: SMU
- NFL draft: 2017: undrafted

Career history
- Minnesota Vikings (2017–2018); Detroit Lions (2018)*; Kansas City Chiefs (2018)*; Denver Broncos (2018–2019)
- * Offseason or practice squad member only
- Stats at Pro Football Reference

Horace Richardson (born September 28, 1993) is an American former professional football cornerback. He played college football at SMU.

== Professional career ==
=== Minnesota Vikings ===
Richardson signed with the Minnesota Vikings as an undrafted free agent on May 5, 2017. He was waived on September 2, 2017, and was signed to the practice squad the next day. He signed a reserve/future contract with the Vikings on January 22, 2018.

On September 1, 2018, Richardson was waived/injured by the Vikings and placed on injured reserve. He was released on October 9, 2018.

=== Detroit Lions ===
On November 6, 2018, Richardson was signed to the Detroit Lions practice squad. He was released on November 20, 2018.

=== Kansas City Chiefs ===
On December 5, 2018, Richardson was signed to the Kansas City Chiefs practice squad.

=== Denver Broncos ===
On December 28, 2018, Richardson was signed by the Denver Broncos off the Chiefs practice squad.

On August 21, 2019, Richardson was placed on injured reserve.

On March 5, 2020, Richardson was released by the Broncos.
