= 2019 Green Bay Packers season =

101st season in franchise history

- Owner: Green Bay Packers, Inc.
- General manager: Brian Gutekunst
- Head coach: Matt LaFleur
- Offensive coordinator: Nathaniel Hackett
- Defensive coordinator: Mike Pettine
- Home stadium: Lambeau Field

Results
- Record: 13–3
- Division place: 1st NFC North
- Playoffs: Won Divisional Playoffs (vs. Seahawks) 28–23; Lost NFC Championship (at 49ers) 20–37
- All-Pros: LT David Bakhtiari (2nd team)
- Pro Bowlers: 5: QB Aaron Rodgers; WR Davante Adams; T David Bakhtiari; DT Kenny Clark; OLB Za'Darius Smith

Uniform
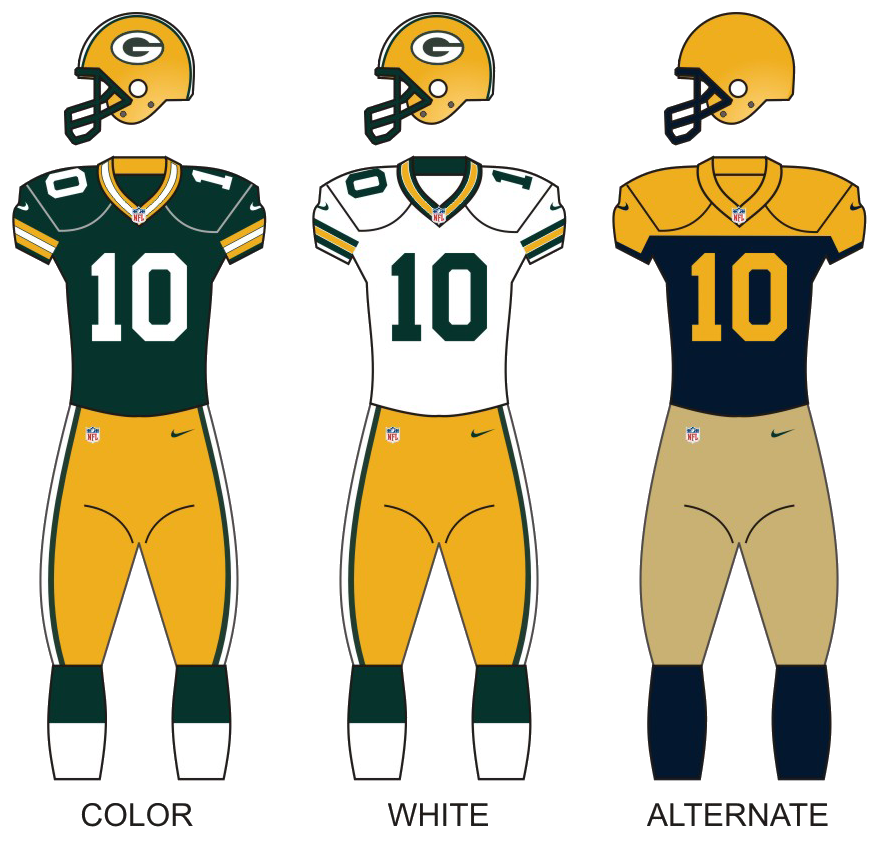

The 2019 season was the Green Bay Packers' 99th in the National Football League (NFL), their 101st overall and their first under new head coach Matt LaFleur. This for first time since 2008 and 2010 that Clay Matthews and Randall Cobb were not on the opening day roster, as Matthews signed with the Los Angeles Rams while Cobb signed with Dallas Cowboys during the offseason. After suffering back-to-back losing seasons for the first time since 1990–91 and missing the playoffs in back-to-back seasons for the first time since 2005–06, the Packers improved on their 6–9–1 record from 2018, finishing 13–3 and returning to the playoffs for the first time since 2016. This was also the Packers' first non-losing season since that same year. Green Bay swept the NFC North for the first time since their franchise-record 15-win 2011 season, and achieved their best record since that season as well.

The Packers defeated the Seattle Seahawks 28–23 in the Divisional round of the playoffs, then visited the top-seeded San Francisco 49ers in the NFC Championship Game, where they lost 37–20.

== Player movements ==
=== Free agents ===
Position	Player	Free agency tag	Date signed	2019 team
G	Byron Bell	UFA		
CB	Bashaud Breeland	UFA	March 18, 2019	Kansas City Chiefs
SS	Kentrell Brice	UFA	March 18, 2019	Tampa Bay Buccaneers
SS	Ibraheim Campbell	UFA	August 8, 2019	Green Bay Packers
WR	Randall Cobb	UFA	March 19, 2019	Dallas Cowboys
CB	Davon House	UFA		
TE	Lance Kendricks	UFA	July 24, 2019	New England Patriots
TE	Marcedes Lewis	UFA	March 18, 2019	Green Bay Packers
OLB	Clay Matthews III	UFA	March 19, 2019	Los Angeles Rams
FS	Eddie Pleasant	UFA		
ILB	Jake Ryan	UFA	March 19, 2019	Jacksonville Jaguars
DE	Muhammad Wilkerson	UFA		
WR	Geronimo Allison	RFA	March 15, 2019	Green Bay Packers
DE	Fadol Brown	ERFA	March 6, 2019	Green Bay Packers
OLB	Reggie Gilbert	ERFA	March 11, 2019	Green Bay Packers
WR	Jake Kumerow	ERFA	March 11, 2019	Green Bay Packers
G	Justin McCray	ERFA	March 7, 2019	Green Bay Packers
G	Lucas Patrick	ERFA	March 11, 2019	Green Bay Packers
TE	Robert Tonyan	ERFA	March 8, 2019	Green Bay Packers

=== Trades ===
August 29, 2019	To Green Bay Packers 2020 7th-round pick	To Tennessee Titans Reggie Gilbert
August 31, 2019	To Green Bay Packers 2020 pick	To Cleveland Browns Justin McCray
September 3, 2019	To Green Bay Packers B. J. Goodson	To New York Giants Draft pick
September 19, 2019	To Green Bay Packers 2020 pick	To Oakland Raiders Trevor Davis

=== Additions ===
Position	Player	Former team	Date
S	Adrian Amos	Chicago Bears	March 14, 2019
LB	Preston Smith	Washington Redskins	March 14, 2019
LB	Za'Darius Smith	Baltimore Ravens	March 14, 2019
G	Billy Turner	Denver Broncos	March 14, 2019
K	Sam Ficken	Seattle Seahawks	April 15, 2019
CB	Chandon Sullivan	Philadelphia Eagles	May 6, 2019
WR	Jawill Davis	New York Giants	May 7, 2019
S	Mike Tyson	Houston Texans	May 13, 2019
WR	Malik Taylor	Tampa Bay Buccaneers	July 19, 2019
RB	Corey Grant	Jacksonville Jaguars	July 26, 2019
RB	Darrin Hall	Cincinnati Bengals	July 27, 2019
LB	Markus Jones	Baltimore Ravens	July 31, 2019
RB	Keith Ford	Indianapolis Colts	August 6, 2019
CB	Derrick Jones	New York Jets	August 11, 2019
FB	Tommy Bohanon	Jacksonville Jaguars	August 12, 2019
LB	James Folston Jr.	Tennessee Titans	August 25, 2019
CB	Jocquez Kalili	Jacksonville Jaguars	August 25, 2019
CB	Jackson Porter	Baltimore Ravens	August 26, 2019
G	Dejon Allen	Chicago Bears	August 29, 2019
CB	Tremon Smith	Kansas City Chiefs	September 17, 2019
G	Adam Pankey	Tennessee Titans	September 21, 2019
OLB	Tim Williams	Baltimore Ravens	October 3, 2019
WR	Ryan Grant	Oakland Raiders	October 16, 2019
OT	Jared Veldheer	New England Patriots	November 29, 2019
RB	Tyler Ervin	Jacksonville Jaguars	December 3, 2019
OT	John Leglue	New Orleans Saints	December 21, 2019

=== Subtractions ===
Position	Player	2019 team	Release date
LB	Antonio Morrison		March 8, 2019
LB	Nick Perry		March 12, 2019
G	Nico Siragusa	Indianapolis Colts	April 29, 2019
S	Jason Thompson		April 29, 2019
RB	Lavon Coleman		May 6, 2019
WR	Matthew Eaton		May 13, 2019
RB	Kapri Bibbs		June 14, 2019
DE	Mike Daniels	Detroit Lions	July 24, 2019
G	Larry Williams		July 29, 2019
CB	Javien Hamilton		July 31, 2019
RB	Corey Grant		August 8, 2019
WR	Jawill Davis		August 10, 2019
CB	Derrick Jones	Houston Texans	August 13, 2019
LB	Kendall Donnerson	Oakland Raiders	August 19, 2019
RB	Darrin Hall		August 24, 2019
S	Josh Jones	Dallas Cowboys	August 25, 2019
LB	James Crawford	Miami Dolphins	September 2, 2019
TE	Evan Baylis		October 3, 2019
DE	Fadol Brown	Chicago Bears	October 5, 2019
CB	Tremon Smith		October 14, 2019
RB	Tra Carson	Detroit Lions	October 16, 2019
CB	Tremon Smith	Philadelphia Eagles	December 2, 2019
OT	Adam Pankey	Miami Dolphins	December 9, 2019
CB	Tony Brown		December 28, 2019

=== Draft ===
2019 Green Bay Packers draft
Round	Pick	Player	Position	College	Notes
1	12	Rashan Gary *	OLB	Michigan	
1	21	Darnell Savage Jr.	S	Maryland	(Note: New Orleans traded their 2019 first-round selection, as well as their 2018 first- and fifth-round selections (27th and 147th) to Green Bay in exchange for Green Bay's 2018 first round selection (14th), during the 2018 NFL draft. During the 2019 NFL draft, the Packers traded their 30th overall selection acquired from New Orleans as well as their 114th and 118th picks to Seattle in exchange for the Seahawks' 21st overall pick.)
2	44	Elgton Jenkins *	C	Mississippi State	
3	75	Jace Sternberger	TE	Texas A&M	
5	150	Kingsley Keke	DE	Texas A&M	
6	185	Ka'dar Hollman	CB	Toledo	
6	194	Dexter Williams	RB	Notre Dame	
7	226	Ty Summers	LB	TCU	
Made roster * Made at least one Pro Bowl during career

Draft trades

- Washington traded their fourth-round selection to Green Bay in exchange for free safety Ha Ha Clinton-Dix.
- Seahawks traded their sixth-round selection to Packers in exchange for quarterback Brett Hundley.

=== Undrafted free agent additions ===
2019 Green Bay Packers Undrafted Free Agents
Position	Player	College	Date
LB	Curtis Bolton	Oklahoma	May 3, 2019
WR	Matthew Eaton	Iowa State	May 3, 2019
CB	Kabion Ento	Colorado	May 3, 2019
CB	Javien Hamilton	Ole Miss	May 3, 2019
TE	Davis Koppenhaver	Duke	May 3, 2019
OT	Yosh Nijman	Virginia Tech	May 3, 2019
LB	Randy Ramsey	Arkansas	May 3, 2019
LB	Greg Roberts	Baylor	May 3, 2019
CB	Nydair Rouse	West Chester	May 3, 2019
QB	Manny Wilkins	Arizona State	May 3, 2019
G	Larry Williams	Oklahoma State	May 3, 2019
WR	Darrius Shepherd	North Dakota State	May 6, 2019
NT	Olive Sagapolu	Wisconsin	July 26, 2019

=== Roster cuts ===
The roster was cut to 53 on August 31, 2019.

Position	Player
G	Dejon Allen
TE	Evan Baylis
FB	Tommy Bohanon
RB	Tra Carson
G	Anthony Coyle
OT	Gerhard de Beer
CB	Kabion Ento
K	Sam Ficken
LB	James Folston Jr.
RB	Keith Ford
S	Natrell Jamerson
LB	Markus Jones
CB	Jocquez Kalili
QB	DeShone Kizer
WR	Allen Lazard
DE	James Looney
S	Tray Matthews
TE	Pharoah McKever
WR	J’Mon Moore
OT	Yosh Nijman
G	Adam Pankey
CB	Jackson Porter
LB	Randy Ramsey
WR	Teo Redding
CB	Nydair Rouse
DE	Olive Sagapolu
LB	Brady Sheldon
NT	Deon Simon
WR	Malik Taylor
QB	Manny Wilkins

== Staff ==
2019 Green Bay Packers staff
Front office: Owner: Publicly held corporation; Executive committee – Board of directors; President/CEO – Mark Murphy; General manager – Brian Gutekunst; Executive vice president/director of football operations – Russ Ball; Senior advisor to football operations – Ted Thompson; Co-director of player personnel – John Wojciechowski; Co-director of player personnel – Jon-Eric Sullivan; Director - football operations – Milt Hendrickson; Director of college scouting – Matt Malaspina; National scout – Sam Seale; Head coaches: Head coach – Matt LaFleur; Offensive coaches: Offensive coordinator – Nathaniel Hackett; Quarterbacks – Luke Getsy; Running backs – Ben Sirmans; Wide receivers – Alvis Whitted; Tight ends – Justin Outten; Offensive line – Adam Stenavich; Assistant offensive line – Luke Butkus; Offensive assistant – Jason Vrable; Offensive quality control – Kevin Koger	Defensive coaches: Defensive coordinator – Mike Pettine; Defensive line – Jerry Montgomery; Outside linebackers – Mike Smith; Inside linebackers – Kirk Olivadotti; Defensive backs – Jason Simmons; Assistant defensive backs – Ryan Downard; Defensive quality control – Wendel Davis; Defensive quality control – Christian Parker; Special teams coaches: Special teams coordinator – Shawn Mennenga; Assistant special teams – Maurice Drayton; Special teams quality control - Rayna Stewart; Strength and conditioning: Strength and conditioning coordinator – Chris Gizzi; Strength and conditioning assistant – Thadeus Jackson; Strength and conditioning assistant – Mark Lovat; Strength and conditioning assistant – Grant Thorne

== Final roster ==
2019 Green Bay Packers roster
Quarterbacks (QB): 8 Tim Boyle; 12 Aaron Rodgers; Running backs (RB): 32 Tyler Ervin; 33 Aaron Jones; 45 Danny Vitale FB; 22 Dexter Williams; 30 Jamaal Williams; Wide receivers (WR): 17 Davante Adams; 81 Geronimo Allison; 11 Ryan Grant; 16 Jake Kumerow; 13 Allen Lazard; 83 Marquez Valdes-Scantling; Tight ends (TE): 80 Jimmy Graham; 89 Marcedes Lewis; 87 Jace Sternberger; 85 Robert Tonyan	Offensive linemen (OL): 69 David Bakhtiari LT; 75 Bryan Bulaga RT; 74 Elgton Jenkins G; 79 John Leglue LT; 70 Alex Light RT; 63 Corey Linsley C; 62 Lucas Patrick G; 77 Billy Turner G; 68 Jared Veldheer RT; Defensive linemen (DL): 90 Montravius Adams DE; 97 Kenny Clark NT; 96 Kingsley Keke DE; 95 Tyler Lancaster DE; 94 Dean Lowry DE	Linebackers (LB): 42 Oren Burks ILB; 51 Kyler Fackrell OLB; 52 Rashan Gary OLB; 93 B. J. Goodson ILB; 50 Blake Martinez ILB; 91 Preston Smith OLB; 55 Za'Darius Smith OLB; 44 Ty Summers ILB; Defensive backs (DB): 23 Jaire Alexander CB; 31 Adrian Amos SS; 35 Ibraheim Campbell SS; 29 Ka'dar Hollman CB; 37 Josh Jackson CB; 20 Kevin King CB; 25 Will Redmond FS; 26 Darnell Savage FS; 39 Chandon Sullivan CB; 38 Tramon Williams CB; Special teams (ST): 43 Hunter Bradley LS; 2 Mason Crosby K; 6 J. K. Scott P	Practice squad: 88 Evan Baylis TE; 64 Cody Conway RT; 34 Damarea Crockett RB; 48 Kabion Ento CB; 49 James Looney TE; 56 Randy Ramsey OLB; 10 Darrius Shepherd WR; 86 Malik Taylor WR; 18 Manny Wilkins QB; 47 Tim Williams OLB; Reserve: 40 Curtis Bolton ILB (IR); 24 Raven Greene FS (IR); 46 Malcolm Johnson FB (IR); 61 Cole Madison G (IR); 73 Yosh Nijman LT (IR); 57 Greg Roberts OLB (PUP); 78 Jason Spriggs LT (IR); 19 Equanimeous St. Brown WR (IR); 65 Lane Taylor G (IR); Rookies in italics 52 active, 9 reserve, 11 practice squad

== Preseason ==
The Packers' preseason opponents and schedule were announced in the spring.

The preseason week 3 game against the Raiders was in the process of being negotiated; plans were for the game to be held at Investors Group Field in Winnipeg, Manitoba, on August 22 after a scheduling conflict prevented the game from being played at Mosaic Stadium in Regina, Saskatchewan. In the event that the Winnipeg negotiations would have fallen through, the game would be moved to Lambeau Field, effectively giving the Packers an extra home game. On June 5, the IG Field in Winnipeg was confirmed as the host.

Due to holes left in the endzones where the field goals are traditionally anchored in Canadian football, the Packers' third preseason game was played on a modified 80-yard field.

Week	Date	Opponent	Result	Record	Venue	Recap
1	August 8	Houston Texans	W 28–26	1–0	Lambeau Field	Recap
2	August 15	at Baltimore Ravens	L 13–26	1–1	M&T Bank Stadium	Recap
3	August 22	at Oakland Raiders	L 21–22	1–2	(Canada) IG Field (Winnipeg)	Recap
4	August 29	Kansas City Chiefs	W 27–20	2–2	Lambeau Field	Recap

== Regular season ==
On March 25, the NFL announced that the Packers will open their season by playing the Chicago Bears in the 2019 Kickoff Game on Thursday, September 5, with the Bears serving as the home team. The game kicked off at 7:20 p.m. CDT, and was televised by NBC. The full schedule was released on April 17.

=== Schedule ===
Week	Date	Opponent	Result	Record	Venue	Recap
1	September 5	at **Chicago Bears**	**W** 10–3	1–0	Soldier Field	Recap
2	September 15	**Minnesota Vikings**	**W** 21–16	2–0	Lambeau Field	Recap
3	September 22	Denver Broncos	**W** 27–16	3–0	Lambeau Field	Recap
4	September 26	Philadelphia Eagles	**L** 27–34	3–1	Lambeau Field	Recap
5	October 6	at Dallas Cowboys	**W** 34–24	4–1	AT&T Stadium	Recap
6	October 14	**Detroit Lions**	**W** 23–22	5–1	Lambeau Field	Recap
7	October 20	Oakland Raiders	**W** 42–24	6–1	Lambeau Field	Recap
8	October 27	at Kansas City Chiefs	**W** 31–24	7–1	Arrowhead Stadium	Recap
9	November 3	at Los Angeles Chargers	**L** 11–26	7–2	Dignity Health Sports Park	Recap
10	November 10	Carolina Panthers	**W** 24–16	8–2	Lambeau Field	Recap
11	Bye					
12	November 24	at San Francisco 49ers	**L** 8–37	8–3	Levi's Stadium	Recap
13	December 1	at New York Giants	**W** 31–13	9–3	MetLife Stadium	Recap
14	December 8	Washington Redskins	**W** 20–15	10–3	Lambeau Field	Recap
15	December 15	**Chicago Bears**	**W** 21–13	11–3	Lambeau Field	Recap
16	December 23	at **Minnesota Vikings**	**W** 23–10	12–3	U.S. Bank Stadium	Recap
17	December 29	at **Detroit Lions**	**W** 23–20	13–3	Ford Field	Recap

Note: Intra-division opponents are in bold text.

=== Game summaries ===
==== Week 1: at Chicago Bears ====
NFL Kickoff Game

Week 1: Green Bay Packers at Chicago Bears – Game summary

Quarter	1	2	3	4	Total
**Packers**	0	7	0	3	**10**
Bears	3	0	0	0	**3**

at Soldier Field, Chicago, Illinois

- Date: September 5
- Game time: 7:20 p.m. CDT
- Game weather: Clear, 65 °F (18 °C)
- Game attendance: 62,435
- Referee: Tony Corrente
- TV announcers (NBC): Al Michaels, Cris Collinsworth, Michele Tafoya and Terry McAulay
- Recap, Game Book

Game information

**First quarter**

- CHI – Eddy Piñeiro 38-yard field goal, 4:09. Bears 3–0. **Drive: 6 plays, 16 yards, 3:44.**

**Second quarter**

- GB – Jimmy Graham 8-yard pass from Aaron Rodgers (Mason Crosby kick), 13:08. Packers 7–3. **Drive: 4 plays, 74 yards, 1:35.**

**Third quarter**

- No scoring plays.

**Fourth quarter**

- GB – Mason Crosby 39-yard field goal, 5:15. Packers 10–3. **Drive: 10 plays, 73 yards, 6:33.**

**Top passers**

- GB – Aaron Rodgers – 18/30, 203 yards, TD
- CHI – Mitchell Trubisky – 26/45, 228 yards, INT

**Top rushers**

- GB – Aaron Jones – 13 rushes, 39 yards
- CHI – Mike Davis – 5 rushes, 19 yards

**Top receivers**

- GB – Marquez Valdes-Scantling – 4 receptions, 52 yards
- CHI – Allen Robinson – 7 receptions, 102 yards

==== Week 2: vs. Minnesota Vikings ====
Week 2: Minnesota Vikings at Green Bay Packers – Game summary

Quarter	1	2	3	4	Total
Vikings	0	10	6	0	**16**
**Packers**	14	7	0	0	**21**

at Lambeau Field, Green Bay, Wisconsin

- Date: September 15
- Game time: 12:00 p.m. CDT
- Game weather: Cloudy, 72 °F (22 °C)
- Game attendance: 78,416
- Referee: John Hussey
- TV announcers (Fox): Chris Myers, Daryl Johnston and Laura Okmin
- Recap, Game Book

Game information

**First quarter**

- GB – Jamaal Williams 15-yard pass from Aaron Rodgers (Mason Crosby kick), 12:50. Packers 7–0. **Drive: 4 plays, 75 yards, 2:10.**
- GB – Geronimo Allison 12-yard pass from Aaron Rodgers (Mason Crosby kick), 3:18. Packers 14–0. **Drive: 11 plays, 63 yards, 5:58.**

**Second quarter**

- GB – Aaron Jones 2-yard run (Mason Crosby kick), 14:16. Packers 21–0. **Drive: 4 plays, 33 yards, 2:00.**
- MIN – Dalvin Cook 75-yard run (Dan Bailey kick), 14:00. Packers 21–7. **Drive: 2 plays, 75 yards, 0:16.**
- MIN – Dan Bailey 31-yard field goal, 0:51. Packers 21–10. **Drive: 6 plays, 60 yards, 0:42.**

**Third quarter**

- MIN – Stefon Diggs 45-yard pass from Kirk Cousins (kick blocked), 9:12. Packers 21–16. **Drive: 3 plays, 42 yards, 0:55.**

**Fourth quarter**

- No scoring plays.

**Top passers**

- MIN – Kirk Cousins – 14/32, 230 yards, TD, 2 INT
- GB – Aaron Rodgers – 22/34, 209 yards, 2 TD

**Top rushers**

- MIN – Dalvin Cook – 20 rushes, 154 yards, TD
- GB – Aaron Jones – 23 rushes, 116 yards, TD

**Top receivers**

- MIN – Adam Thielen – 5 receptions, 75 yards
- GB – Davante Adams – 7 receptions, 106 yards

==== Week 3: vs. Denver Broncos ====
Week 3: Denver Broncos at Green Bay Packers – Game summary

Quarter	1	2	3	4	Total
Broncos	0	10	6	0	**16**
**Packers**	7	10	7	3	**27**

at Lambeau Field, Green Bay, Wisconsin

- Date: September 22
- Game time: 12:00 p.m. CDT
- Game weather: Rain, 69 °F (21 °C)
- Game attendance: 78,078
- Referee: Brad Rogers
- TV announcers (Fox): Chris Myers, Daryl Johnston and Laura Okmin
- Recap, Game Book

Game information

**First quarter**

- GB – Marquez Valdes-Scantling 40-yard pass from Aaron Rodgers (Mason Crosby kick), 12:16. Packers 7–0. **Drive: 5 plays, 75 yards, 2:44.**

**Second quarter**

- DEN – Phillip Lindsay 1-yard run (Brandon McManus kick), 14:18. Tied 7–7. **Drive: 15 plays, 77 yards, 8:35.**
- GB – Mason Crosby 42-yard field goal, 11:19. Packers 10–7. **Drive: 7 plays, 51 yards, 2:59.**
- DEN – Brandon McManus 30-yard field goal, 3:50. Tied 10–10. **Drive: 15 plays, 63 yards, 7:29.**
- GB – Aaron Jones 7-yard run (Mason Crosby kick), 1:56. Packers 17–10. **Drive: 2 plays, 5 yards, 0:21.**

**Third quarter**

- GB – Aaron Jones 1-yard run (Mason Crosby kick), 12:09. Packers 24–10. **Drive: 4 plays, 37 yards, 1:35.**
- DEN – Phillip Lindsay 1-yard run (kick failed, hit left upright), 5:59. Packers 24–16. **Drive: 12 plays, 75 yards, 6:10.**

**Fourth quarter**

- GB – Mason Crosby 41-yard field goal, 5:49. Packers 27–16. **Drive: 11 plays, 51 yards, 7:41.**

**Top passers**

- DEN – Joe Flacco – 20/29, 213 yards, INT
- GB – Aaron Rodgers – 17/29, 235 yards, TD

**Top rushers**

- DEN – Phillip Lindsay – 21 rushes, 81 yards, 2 TD
- GB – Jamaal Williams – 12 rushes, 59 yards

**Top receivers**

- DEN – Courtland Sutton – 5 receptions, 87 yards
- GB – Marquez Valdes-Scantling – 6 receptions, 99 yards, TD

==== Week 4: vs. Philadelphia Eagles ====
Week 4: Philadelphia Eagles at Green Bay Packers – Game summary

Quarter	1	2	3	4	Total
**Eagles**	0	21	6	7	**34**
Packers	7	13	7	0	**27**

at Lambeau Field, Green Bay, Wisconsin

- Date: September 26
- Game time: 7:20 p.m. CDT
- Game weather: Cloudy, 60 °F (16 °C)
- Game attendance: 77,509
- Referee: Clay Martin
- TV announcers (Fox/NFLN/Amazon Prime): Joe Buck, Troy Aikman, Erin Andrews and Kristina Pink
- Recap, Game Book

Game information

**First quarter**

- GB – Aaron Jones 3-yard run (Mason Crosby kick), 10:31. Packers 7–0. **Drive: 5 plays, 89 yards, 2:18.**

**Second quarter**

- GB – Mason Crosby 30-yard field goal, 14:01. Packers 10–0. **Drive: 15 plays, 78 yards, 8:01.**
- PHI – Alshon Jeffery 6-yard pass from Carson Wentz (Jake Elliott kick), 11:48. Packers 10–7. **Drive: 5 plays, 34 yards, 2:13.**
- GB – Mason Crosby 31-yard field goal, 8:24. Packers 13–7. **Drive: 7 plays, 63 yards, 3:24.**
- PHI – Dallas Goedert 3-yard pass from Carson Wentz (Jake Elliott kick), 2:45. Eagles 14–13. **Drive: 11 plays, 60 yards, 5:39.**
- PHI – Jordan Howard 1-yard run (Jake Elliott kick), 0:59. Eagles 21–13. **Drive: 4 plays, 17 yards, 0:54.**
- GB – Geronimo Allison 19-yard pass from Aaron Rodgers (Mason Crosby kick), 0:09. Eagles 21–20. **Drive: 7 plays, 70 yards, 0:50.**

**Third quarter**

- PHI – Jordan Howard 20-yard pass from Carson Wentz (pass failed), 9:12. Eagles 27–20. **Drive: 8 plays, 76 yards, 3:43.**
- GB – Jimmy Graham 14-yard pass from Aaron Rodgers (Mason Crosby kick), 3:16. Tied 27–27. **Drive: 8 plays, 72 yards, 3:34.**

**Fourth quarter**

- PHI – Jordan Howard 2-yard run (Jake Elliott kick), 14:13. Eagles 34–27. **Drive: 8 plays, 75 yards, 4:03.**

**Top passers**

- PHI – Carson Wentz – 16/27, 160 yards, 3 TD
- GB – Aaron Rodgers – 34/53, 422 yards, 2 TD, INT

**Top rushers**

- PHI – Jordan Howard – 15 rushes, 87 yards, 2 TD
- GB – Aaron Rodgers – 5 rushes, 46 yards

**Top receivers**

- PHI – Zach Ertz – 7 receptions, 65 yards
- GB – Davante Adams – 10 receptions, 180 yards

==== Week 5: at Dallas Cowboys ====
Week 5: Green Bay Packers at Dallas Cowboys – Game summary

Quarter	1	2	3	4	Total
**Packers**	14	3	14	3	**34**
Cowboys	0	0	10	14	**24**

at AT&T Stadium, Arlington, Texas

- Date: October 6
- Game time: 3:25 p.m. CDT
- Game weather: None (retractable roof closed)
- Game attendance: 93,024
- Referee: Ronald Torbert
- TV announcers (Fox): Joe Buck, Troy Aikman and Erin Andrews
- Recap, Game Book

Game information

**First quarter**

- GB – Aaron Jones 18-yard run (Mason Crosby kick), 8:57. Packers 7–0. **Drive: 5 plays, 47 yards, 1:29.**
- GB – Aaron Jones 3-yard run (Mason Crosby kick), 0:03. Packers 14–0. **Drive: 9 plays, 89 yards, 5:20.**

**Second quarter**

- GB – Mason Crosby 20-yard field goal, 2:19. Packers 17–0. **Drive: 12 plays, 79 yards, 6:03.**

**Third quarter**

- GB – Aaron Jones 5-yard run (Mason Crosby kick), 9:33. Packers 24–0. **Drive: 7 plays, 58 yards, 3:53.**
- DAL – Brett Maher 36-yard field goal, 5:54. Packers 24–3. **Drive: 11 plays, 57 yards, 3:39.**
- GB – Aaron Jones 1-yard run (Mason Crosby kick), 3:30. Packers 31–3. **Drive: 4 plays, 79 yards, 2:24.**
- DAL – Michael Gallup 40-yard pass from Dak Prescott (Brett Maher kick), 2:00. Packers 31–10. **Drive: 6 plays, 75 yards, 1:30.**

**Fourth quarter**

- DAL – Ezekiel Elliott 2-yard run (Brett Maher kick), 13:52. Packers 31–17. **Drive: 5 plays, 70 yards, 1:27.**
- GB – Mason Crosby 38-yard field goal, 8:07. Packers 34–17. **Drive: 4 plays, 9 yards, 2:14.**
- DAL – Amari Cooper 53-yard pass from Dak Prescott (Brett Maher kick), 7:46. Packers 34–24. **Drive: 2 plays, 75 yards, 0:21.**

**Top passers**

- GB – Aaron Rodgers – 22/34, 238 yards
- DAL – Dak Prescott – 27/44, 463 yards, 2 TD, 3 INT

**Top rushers**

- GB – Aaron Jones – 19 rushes, 107 yards, 4 TD
- DAL – Ezekiel Elliott – 12 rushes, 62 yards, TD

**Top receivers**

- GB – Aaron Jones – 7 receptions, 75 yards
- DAL – Amari Cooper – 11 receptions, 226 yards, TD

The Packers controlled the game early on, establishing a 31–3 lead midway through the third quarter with running back Aaron Jones rushing for four touchdowns and the Packers defense forcing three interceptions off of Cowboys quarterback Dak Prescott. Although the Cowboys attempted to come back late in the game, with the team totaling over 500 yards of total offense and 3 touchdowns, the Packers' lead would prove too much to overcome. With the win, the Packers improved to 4-1 and won their third straight meeting against the Cowboys.

==== Week 6: vs. Detroit Lions ====
Week 6: Detroit Lions at Green Bay Packers – Game summary

Quarter	1	2	3	4	Total
Lions	10	3	6	3	**22**
**Packers**	0	10	3	10	**23**

at Lambeau Field, Green Bay, Wisconsin

- Date: October 14
- Game time: 7:15 p.m. CDT
- Game weather: Cloudy, 43 °F (6 °C)
- Game attendance: 76,947
- Referee: Clete Blakeman
- TV announcers (ESPN): Joe Tessitore, Booger McFarland, Lisa Salters and John Parry
- Recap, Game Book

Game information

**First quarter**

- DET – Matt Prater 26-yard field goal, 12:41. Lions 3–0. **Drive: 5 plays, 69 yards, 2:19.**
- DET – Kerryon Johnson 1-yard run (Matt Prater kick), 6:35. Lions 10–0. **Drive: 8 plays, 74 yards, 4:37.**

**Second quarter**

- DET – Matt Prater 22-yard field goal, 13:28. Lions 13–0. **Drive: 11 plays, 64 yards, 5:02.**
- GB – Jamaal Williams 5-yard pass from Aaron Rodgers (Mason Crosby kick), 7:31. Lions 13–7. **Drive: 14 plays, 60 yards, 5:57.**
- GB – Mason Crosby 37-yard field goal, 0:07. Lions 13–10. **Drive: 13 plays, 75 yards, 4:27.**

**Third quarter**

- GB – Mason Crosby 48-yard field goal, 12:35. Tied 13–13. **Drive: 5 plays, 48 yards, 2:25.**
- DET – Matt Prater 41-yard field goal, 9:01. Lions 16–13. **Drive: 4 plays, 2 yards, 0:58.**
- DET – Matt Prater 51-yard field goal, 3:27. Lions 19–13. **Drive: 7 plays, 34 yards, 3:06.**

**Fourth quarter**

- DET – Matt Prater 54-yard field goal, 12:17. Lions 22–13. **Drive: 4 plays, 8 yards, 0:52.**
- GB – Allen Lazard 35-yard pass from Aaron Rodgers (Mason Crosby kick), 9:03. Lions 22–20. **Drive: 7 plays, 79 yards, 3:14.**
- GB – Mason Crosby 23-yard field goal, 0:00. Packers 23–22. **Drive: 14 plays, 77 yards, 6:46.**

**Top passers**

- DET – Matthew Stafford – 18/32, 265 yards
- GB – Aaron Rodgers – 24/39, 283 yards, 2 TD, INT

**Top rushers**

- DET – Kerryon Johnson – 13 rushes, 34 yards, TD
- GB – Jamaal Williams – 14 rushes, 104 yards

**Top receivers**

- DET – Kenny Golladay – 5 receptions, 121 yards
- GB – Allen Lazard – 4 receptions, 65 yards, TD

This Monday Night Football game proved to be highly controversial, due to two highly questionable and controversial hands to the face penalties against Lions defensive end Trey Flowers helped the Packers score in the 4th quarter. Nevertheless, the Packers improved to 5-1 and snapped a 4-game losing streak to the Lions.

==== Week 7: vs. Oakland Raiders ====
Week 7: Oakland Raiders at Green Bay Packers – Game summary

Quarter	1	2	3	4	Total
Raiders	3	7	7	7	**24**
**Packers**	7	14	14	7	**42**

at Lambeau Field, Green Bay, Wisconsin

- Date: October 20
- Game time: 12:00 p.m. CDT
- Game weather: Sunny, 55 °F (13 °C)
- Game attendance: 78,160
- Referee: Alex Kemp
- TV announcers (CBS): Jim Nantz, Tony Romo and Tracy Wolfson
- Recap, Game Book

Game information

**First quarter**

- OAK – Daniel Carlson 45-yard field goal, 12:21. Raiders 3–0. **Drive: 7 plays, 56 yards, 2:39.**
- GB – Aaron Jones 21-yard pass from Aaron Rodgers (Mason Crosby kick), 9:42. Packers 7–3. **Drive: 6 plays, 75 yards, 2:39.**

**Second quarter**

- OAK – Foster Moreau 10-yard pass from Derek Carr (Daniel Carlson kick), 11:33. Raiders 10–7. **Drive: 14 plays, 86 yards, 8:28.**
- GB – Jamaal Williams 2-yard pass from Aaron Rodgers (Mason Crosby kick), 3:27. Packers 14–10. **Drive: 11 plays, 82 yards, 8:06.**
- GB – Jake Kumerow 37-yard pass from Aaron Rodgers (Mason Crosby kick), 0:12. Packers 21–10. **Drive: 7 plays, 80 yards, 1:37.**

**Third quarter**

- GB – Aaron Rodgers 3-yard run (Mason Crosby kick), 12:04. Packers 28–10. **Drive: 5 plays, 78 yards, 2:56.**
- OAK – Darren Waller 7-yard pass from Derek Carr (Daniel Carlson kick), 6:41. Packers 28–17. **Drive: 11 plays, 75 yards, 5:23.**
- GB – Jimmy Graham 3-yard pass from Aaron Rodgers (Mason Crosby kick), 2:06. Packers 35–17. **Drive: 8 plays, 85 yards, 4:35.**

**Fourth quarter**

- GB – Marquez Valdes-Scantling 74-yard pass from Aaron Rodgers (Mason Crosby kick), 6:28. Packers 42–17. **Drive: 3 plays, 80 yards, 1:41.**
- OAK – Darren Waller 17-yard pass from Mike Glennon (Daniel Carlson kick), 1:32. Packers 42–24. **Drive: 4 plays, 40 yards, 0:37.**

**Top passers**

- OAK – Derek Carr – 22/28, 293 yards, 2 TD, INT
- GB – Aaron Rodgers – 25/31, 429 yards, 5 TD

**Top rushers**

- OAK – Josh Jacobs – 21 rushes, 124 yards
- GB – Aaron Jones – 12 rushes, 50 yards

**Top receivers**

- OAK – Darren Waller – 7 receptions, 126 yards, 2 TD
- GB – Marquez Valdes-Scantling – 2 receptions, 133 yards, TD

Quarterback Aaron Rodgers became the first player in Packers history to throw for a perfect passer rating.

==== Week 8: at Kansas City Chiefs ====
Week 8: Green Bay Packers at Kansas City Chiefs – Game summary

Quarter	1	2	3	4	Total
**Packers**	14	0	3	14	**31**
Chiefs	0	17	0	7	**24**

at Arrowhead Stadium, Kansas City, Missouri

- Date: October 27
- Game time: 7:20 p.m. CDT
- Game weather: Cloudy, 54 °F (12 °C)
- Game attendance: 73,558
- Referee: Bill Vinovich
- TV announcers (NBC): Al Michaels, Cris Collinsworth and Michele Tafoya
- Recap, Game Book

Game information

**First quarter**

- GB – Aaron Jones 4-yard pass from Aaron Rodgers (Mason Crosby kick), 8:43. Packers 7–0. **Drive: 10 plays, 74 yards, 6:17.**
- GB – Jamaal Williams 1-yard run (Mason Crosby kick), 2:09. Packers 14–0. **Drive: 4 plays, 60 yards, 2:02.**

**Second quarter**

- KC – Travis Kelce 29-yard pass from Matt Moore (Harrison Butker kick), 10:55. Packers 14–7. **Drive: 12 plays, 89 yards, 6:14.**
- KC – Mecole Hardman 30-yard pass from Matt Moore (Harrison Butker kick), 6:14. Tied 14–14. **Drive: 5 plays, 62 yards, 1:50.**
- KC – Harrison Butker 28-yard field goal, 0:56. Chiefs 17–14. **Drive: 11 plays, 74 yards, 3:03.**

**Third quarter**

- GB – Mason Crosby 35-yard field goal, 1:31. Tied 17–17. **Drive: 15 plays, 72 yards, 8:33.**

**Fourth quarter**

- GB – Jamaal Williams 3-yard pass from Aaron Rodgers (Mason Crosby kick), 13:57. Packers 24–17. **Drive: 5 plays, 27 yards, 2:22.**
- KC – Damien Williams 3-yard run (Harrison Butker kick), 9:01. Tied 24–24. **Drive: 10 plays, 75 yards, 4:56.**
- GB – Aaron Jones 67-yard pass from Aaron Rodgers (Mason Crosby kick), 8:02. Packers 31–24. **Drive: 2 plays, 75 yards, 0:59.**

**Top passers**

- GB – Aaron Rodgers – 23/33, 305 yards, 3 TD
- KC – Matt Moore – 24/36, 267 yards, 2 TD

**Top rushers**

- GB – Aaron Jones – 13 rushes, 67 yards
- KC – LeSean McCoy – 9 rushes, 40 yards

**Top receivers**

- GB – Aaron Jones – 7 receptions, 159 yards, 2 TD
- KC – Tyreek Hill – 6 receptions, 76 yards

==== Week 9: at Los Angeles Chargers ====
Week 9: Green Bay Packers at Los Angeles Chargers – Game summary

Quarter	1	2	3	4	Total
Packers	0	0	3	8	**11**
**Chargers**	6	3	10	7	**26**

at Dignity Health Sports Park, Carson, California

- Date: November 3
- Game time: 3:25 p.m. CST/1:25 p.m. PST
- Game weather: Clear, 79 °F (26 °C)
- Game attendance: 25,435
- Referee: Adrian Hill
- TV announcers (CBS): Jim Nantz, Tony Romo and Tracy Wolfson
- Recap, Game Book

Game information

**First quarter**

- LAC – Michael Badgley 29-yard field goal, 6:56. Chargers 3–0. **Drive: 15 plays, 84 yards, 8:04.**
- LAC – Michael Badgley 40-yard field goal, 1:04. Chargers 6–0. **Drive: 5 plays, 37 yards, 3:09.**

**Second quarter**

- LAC – Michael Badgley 34-yard field goal, 0:00. Chargers 9–0. **Drive: 13 plays, 76 yards, 4:21.**

**Third quarter**

- LAC – Michael Badgley 43-yard field goal, 9:41. Chargers 12–0. **Drive: 8 plays, 52 yards, 3:36.**
- LAC – Melvin Gordon 1-yard run (Michael Badgley kick), 3:56. Chargers 19–0. **Drive: 6 plays, 27 yards, 3:20.**
- GB – Mason Crosby 54-yard field goal, 0:46. Chargers 19–3. **Drive: 8 plays, 24 yards, 3:10.**

**Fourth quarter**

- LAC – Melvin Gordon 1-yard run (Michael Badgley kick), 10:32. Chargers 26–3. **Drive: 10 plays, 75 yards, 5:14.**
- GB – Jamaal Williams 10-yard pass from Aaron Rodgers, (Aaron Rodgers run), 6:21. Chargers 26–11. **Drive: 9 plays, 75 yards, 4:11.**

**Top passers**

- GB – Aaron Rodgers – 23/35, 161 yards, TD
- LAC – Philip Rivers – 21/28, 294 yards

**Top rushers**

- GB – Aaron Jones – 8 rushes, 30 yards
- LAC – Melvin Gordon – 20 rushes, 80 yards, 2 TD

**Top receivers**

- GB – Allen Lazard – 3 receptions, 44 yards
- LAC – Mike Williams – 3 receptions, 111 yards

==== Week 10: vs. Carolina Panthers ====
Week 10: Carolina Panthers at Green Bay Packers – Game summary

Quarter	1	2	3	4	Total
Panthers	7	3	0	6	**16**
**Packers**	7	7	10	0	**24**

at Lambeau Field, Green Bay, Wisconsin

- Date: November 10
- Game time: 3:25 p.m. CST
- Game weather: Cloudy, 34 °F (1 °C)
- Game attendance: 78,090
- Referee: Jerome Boger
- TV announcers (Fox): Joe Buck, Troy Aikman and Erin Andrews
- Recap, Game Book

Game information

**First quarter**

- CAR – Curtis Samuel 2-yard pass from Kyle Allen (Joey Slye kick), 7:22. Panthers 7–0. **Drive: 5 plays, 53 yards, 2:34.**
- GB – Aaron Jones 5-yard run (Mason Crosby kick), 3:39. Tied 7–7. **Drive: 7 plays, 75 yards, 3:43.**

**Second quarter**

- CAR – Joey Slye 50-yard field goal, 15:00. Panthers 10–7. **Drive: 8 plays, 43 yards, 3:40.**
- GB – Aaron Jones 1-yard run (Mason Crosby kick), 9:29. Packers 14–10. **Drive: 6 plays, 52 yards, 3:20.**

**Third quarter**

- GB – Aaron Jones 13-yard run (Mason Crosby kick), 11:54. Packers 21–10. **Drive: 5 plays, 75 yards, 3:10.**
- GB – Mason Crosby 47-yard field goal, 1:26. Packers 24–10. **Drive: 11 plays, 51 yards, 5:49.**

**Fourth quarter**

- CAR – Christian McCaffrey 3-yard run (pass failed), 12:02. Packers 24–16. **Drive: 10 plays, 82 yards, 4:23.**

**Top passers**

- CAR – Kyle Allen – 28/43, 307 yards, TD, INT
- GB – Aaron Rodgers – 17/29, 233 yards

**Top rushers**

- CAR – Christian McCaffrey – 20 rushes, 108 yards, TD
- GB – Aaron Jones – 13 rushes, 93 yards, 3 TD

**Top receivers**

- CAR – D. J. Moore – 9 receptions, 120 yards
- GB – Davante Adams – 7 receptions, 118 yards

==== Week 12: at San Francisco 49ers ====
Week 12: Green Bay Packers at San Francisco 49ers – Game summary

Quarter	1	2	3	4	Total
Packers	0	0	8	0	**8**
**49ers**	10	13	7	7	**37**

at Levi's Stadium, Santa Clara, California

- Date: November 24
- Game time: 7:20 p.m. CST/5:20 p.m. PST
- Game weather: Clear, 63 °F (17 °C)
- Game attendance: 71,500
- Referee: Carl Cheffers
- TV announcers (NBC): Al Michaels, Cris Collinsworth and Michele Tafoya
- Recap, Game Book

Game information

**First quarter**

- SF – Tevin Coleman 2-yard run (Chase McLaughlin kick), 13:02. 49ers 7–0. **Drive: 1 play, 2 yards, 0:05.**
- SF – Chase McLaughlin 29-yard field goal, 3:13. 49ers 10–0. **Drive: 7 plays, 40 yards, 3:43.**

**Second quarter**

- SF – Chase McLaughlin 27-yard field goal, 2:55. 49ers 13–0. **Drive: 7 plays, 59 yards, 3:16.**
- SF – Deebo Samuel 42-yard pass from Jimmy Garoppolo (Chase McLaughlin kick), 0:58. 49ers 20–0. **Drive: 3 plays, 61 yards, 0:58.**
- SF – Chase McLaughlin 48-yard field goal, 0:00. 49ers 23–0. **Drive: 4 plays, 22 yards, 0:24.**

**Third quarter**

- GB – Davante Adams 2-yard pass from Aaron Rodgers (Davante Adams pass from Aaron Rodgers), 3:52. 49ers 23–8. **Drive: 13 plays, 65 yards, 8:34.**
- SF – George Kittle 61-yard pass from Jimmy Garoppolo (Chase McLaughlin kick), 2:55. 49ers 30–8. **Drive: 2 plays, 75 yards, 0:57.**

**Fourth quarter**

- SF – Raheem Mostert 15-yard run (Chase McLaughlin kick), 4:58. 49ers 37–8. **Drive: 10 plays, 69 yards, 6:31.**

**Top passers**

- GB – Aaron Rodgers – 20/33, 104 yards, TD
- SF – Jimmy Garoppolo – 14/20, 253 yards, 2 TD

**Top rushers**

- GB – Jamaal Williams – 11 rushes, 45 yards
- SF – Raheem Mostert – 6 rushes, 45 yards, TD

**Top receivers**

- GB – Davante Adams – 7 receptions, 43 yards, TD
- SF – George Kittle – 6 receptions, 129 yards, TD

==== Week 13: at New York Giants ====
Week 13: Green Bay Packers at New York Giants – Game summary

Quarter	1	2	3	4	Total
**Packers**	14	3	0	14	**31**
Giants	7	3	3	0	**13**

at MetLife Stadium, East Rutherford, New Jersey

- Date: December 1
- Game time: 1:00 p.m. EST/12:00 p.m. CST
- Game weather: Snow, 32 °F (0 °C)
- Game attendance: 75,950
- Referee: Craig Wrolstad
- TV announcers (Fox): Thom Brennaman, Chris Spielman and Shannon Spake
- Recap, Game Book

Game information

**First quarter**

- GB – Davante Adams 8-yard pass from Aaron Rodgers (Mason Crosby kick), 8:43. Packers 7–0. **Drive: 7 plays, 72 yards, 3:54.**
- NYG – Sterling Shepard 18-yard pass from Daniel Jones (Aldrick Rosas kick), 3:16. Tied 7–7. **Drive: 11 plays, 71 yards, 5:27.**
- GB – Allen Lazard 37-yard pass from Aaron Rodgers (Mason Crosby kick), 1:15. Packers 14–7. **Drive: 5 plays, 66 yards, 2:01.**

**Second quarter**

- GB – Mason Crosby 47-yard field goal, 12:02. Packers 17–7. **Drive: 7 plays, 24 yards, 2:36.**
- NYG – Aldrick Rosas 27-yard field goal, 2:31. Packers 17–10. **Drive: 18 plays, 61 yards, 9:31.**

**Third quarter**

- NYG – Aldrick Rosas 45-yard field goal, 6:37. Packers 17–13. **Drive: 10 plays, 52 yards, 5:11.**

**Fourth quarter**

- GB – Davante Adams 17-yard pass from Aaron Rodgers (Mason Crosby kick), 14:22. Packers 24–13. **Drive: 14 plays, 74 yards, 7:15.**
- GB – Marcedes Lewis 1-yard pass from Aaron Rodgers (Mason Crosby kick), 7:05. Packers 31–13. **Drive: 8 plays, 28 yards, 3:55.**

**Top passers**

- GB – Aaron Rodgers – 21/33, 243 yards, 4 TD
- NYG – Daniel Jones – 20/37, 240 yards, TD, 3 INT

**Top rushers**

- GB – Jamaal Williams – 10 rushes, 41 yards
- NYG – Saquon Barkley – 19 rushes, 83 yards

**Top receivers**

- GB – Allen Lazard – 3 receptions, 103 yards, TD
- NYG – Kaden Smith – 6 receptions, 70 yards

The Packers beat the Giants in the snow to continue their winning streak.

==== Week 14: vs. Washington Redskins ====
Week 14: Washington Redskins at Green Bay Packers – Game summary

Quarter	1	2	3	4	Total
Redskins	0	6	3	6	**15**
**Packers**	14	0	3	3	**20**

at Lambeau Field, Green Bay, Wisconsin

- Date: December 8
- Game time: 12:00 p.m. CST
- Game weather: Cloudy, 37 °F (3 °C)
- Game attendance: 77,296
- Referee: Clay Martin
- TV announcers (Fox): Kenny Albert, Ronde Barber and Lindsay Czarniak
- Recap, Game Book

Game information

**First quarter**

- GB – Aaron Jones 7-yard run (Mason Crosby kick), 9:06. Packers 7–0. **Drive: 7 plays, 55 yards, 3:44.**
- GB – Robert Tonyan 12-yard pass from Aaron Rodgers (Mason Crosby kick), 0:34. Packers 14–0. **Drive: 5 plays, 57 yards, 3:06.**

**Second quarter**

- WAS – Adrian Peterson 2-yard run (kick failed), 3:44. Packers 14–6. **Drive: 11 plays, 95 yards, 5:46.**

**Third quarter**

- GB – Mason Crosby 32-yard field goal, 10:08. Packers 17–6. **Drive: 10 plays, 60 yards, 4:52.**
- WAS – Dustin Hopkins 52-yard field goal, 0:11. Packers 17–9. **Drive: 12 plays, 37 yards, 6:34.**

**Fourth quarter**

- GB – Mason Crosby 33-yard field goal, 2:34. Packers 20–9. **Drive: 14 plays, 74 yards, 7:24.**
- WAS – Terry McLaurin 13-yard pass from Dwayne Haskins (run failed), 1:17. Packers 20–15. **Drive: 8 plays, 75 yards, 1:17.**

**Top passers**

- WAS – Dwayne Haskins – 16/27, 170 yards, TD, INT
- GB – Aaron Rodgers – 18/28, 195 yards, TD

**Top rushers**

- WAS – Adrian Peterson – 20 rushes, 76 yards, TD
- GB – Aaron Jones – 16 rushes, 134 yards, TD

**Top receivers**

- WAS – Terry McLaurin – 4 receptions, 57 yards, TD
- GB – Aaron Jones – 6 receptions, 58 yards

==== Week 15: vs. Chicago Bears ====
Week 15: Chicago Bears at Green Bay Packers – Game summary

Quarter	1	2	3	4	Total
Bears	0	3	0	10	**13**
**Packers**	7	0	14	0	**21**

at Lambeau Field, Green Bay, Wisconsin

- Date: December 15
- Game time: 12:00 p.m. CST
- Game weather: Sunny, 11 °F (−12 °C)
- Game attendance: 78,266
- Referee: Scott Novak
- TV announcers (Fox): Kevin Burkhardt, Charles Davis and Pam Oliver
- Recap, Game Book

Game information

**First quarter**

- GB – Davante Adams 29-yard pass from Aaron Rodgers (Mason Crosby kick), 4:47. Packers 7–0. **Drive: 4 plays, 35 yards, 2:08.**

**Second quarter**

- CHI – Eddy Piñeiro 30-yard field goal, 1:45. Packers 7–3. **Drive: 8 plays, 52 yards, 3:18.**

**Third quarter**

- GB – Aaron Jones 21-yard run (Mason Crosby kick), 12:44. Packers 14–3. **Drive: 5 plays, 73 yards, 2:16.**
- GB – Aaron Jones 2-yard run (Mason Crosby kick), 7:48. Packers 21–3. **Drive: 5 plays, 66 yards, 1:57.**

**Fourth quarter**

- CHI – Eddy Piñeiro 27-yard field goal, 14:56. Packers 21–6. **Drive: 11 plays, 75 yards, 3:37.**
- CHI – Anthony Miller 2-yard pass from Mitchell Trubisky (Eddy Piñeiro kick), 8:09. Packers 21–13. **Drive: 13 plays, 67 yards, 5:03.**

**Top passers**

- CHI – Mitchell Trubisky – 29/53, 334 yards, TD, 2 INT
- GB – Aaron Rodgers – 16/33, 203 yards, TD

**Top rushers**

- CHI – David Montgomery – 14 rushes, 39 yards
- GB – Aaron Jones – 13 rushes, 51 yards, 2 TD

**Top receivers**

- CHI – Anthony Miller – 9 receptions, 118 yards, TD
- GB – Davante Adams – 7 receptions, 103 yards, TD

With the win, the Packers improved to 11–3. With the victory of the Minnesota Vikings over the Los Angeles Chargers, the Bears were eliminated from post season contention.

==== Week 16: at Minnesota Vikings ====
Week 16: Green Bay Packers at Minnesota Vikings – Game summary

Quarter	1	2	3	4	Total
**Packers**	3	6	8	6	**23**
Vikings	3	7	0	0	**10**

at U.S. Bank Stadium, Minneapolis, Minnesota

- Date: December 23
- Game time: 7:15 p.m. CST
- Game weather: None (indoor stadium)
- Game attendance: 67,157
- Referee: Bill Vinovich
- TV announcers (ESPN): Joe Tessitore, Booger McFarland and Lisa Salters
- Recap, Game Book

Game information

**First quarter**

- MIN – Dan Bailey 23-yard field goal, 13:11. Vikings 3–0. **Drive: 4 plays, 5 yards, 0:49.**
- GB – Mason Crosby 42-yard field goal, 2:00. Tied 3–3. **Drive: 9 plays, 49 yards, 4:04.**

**Second quarter**

- MIN – Stefon Diggs 21-yard pass from Kirk Cousins (Dan Bailey kick), 13:33. Vikings 10–3. **Drive: 3 plays, 26 yards, 1:19.**
- GB – Mason Crosby 33-yard field goal, 7:00. Vikings 10–6. **Drive: 13 plays, 60 yards, 6:33.**
- GB – Mason Crosby 19-yard field goal, 0:00. Vikings 10–9. **Drive: 8 plays, 54 yards, 0:55.**

**Third quarter**

- GB – Aaron Jones 12-yard run (Geronimo Allison pass from Aaron Rodgers), 2:03. Packers 17–10. **Drive: 8 plays, 53 yards, 5:09.**

**Fourth quarter**

- GB – Aaron Jones 56-yard run (kick failed), 5:51. Packers 23–10. **Drive: 3 plays, 75 yards, 1:49.**

**Top passers**

- GB – Aaron Rodgers – 26/40, 216 yards, INT
- MIN – Kirk Cousins – 16/31, 122 yards, TD, INT

**Top rushers**

- GB – Aaron Jones – 23 rushes, 154 yards, 2 TD
- MIN – Mike Boone – 11 rushes, 28 yards

**Top receivers**

- GB – Davante Adams – 13 receptions, 116 yards
- MIN – Stefon Diggs – 3 receptions, 57 yards, TD

With the win, the Packers advanced to 12–3 and won the NFC North. The Packers also won 12 games for the first time since 2014, and advanced to a record of 12–3 for the first time since 2007.

This was the first regular-season game of Aaron Rodgers' career, and second game overall, where he threw at least one interception and no touchdown passes and won the game. The only other time this occurred was the 2010 NFC Championship Game against the Bears.

==== Week 17: at Detroit Lions ====
Week 17: Green Bay Packers at Detroit Lions – Game summary

Quarter	1	2	3	4	Total
**Packers**	0	3	7	13	**23**
Lions	7	10	0	3	**20**

at Ford Field, Detroit, Michigan

- Date: December 29
- Game time: 1:00 p.m. EST/12:00 p.m. CST
- Game weather: None (indoor stadium)
- Game attendance: 62,840
- Referee: Shawn Hochuli
- TV announcers (Fox): Kevin Burkhardt, Charles Davis and Pam Oliver
- Recap, Game Book

Game information

**First quarter**

- DET – David Blough 19-yard pass from Danny Amendola (Matt Prater kick), 7:59. Lions 7–0. **Drive: 8 plays, 83 yards, 4:14.**

**Second quarter**

- DET – Kerryon Johnson 1-yard run (Matt Prater kick), 3:13. Lions 14–0. **Drive: 11 plays, 83 yards, 5:52.**
- GB – Mason Crosby 32-yard field goal, 0:20. Lions 14–3. **Drive: 10 plays, 76 yards, 2:53.**
- DET – Matt Prater 42-yard field goal, 0:00. Lions 17–3. **Drive: 4 plays, 51 yards, 0:20.**

**Third quarter**

- GB – Davante Adams 20-yard pass from Aaron Rodgers (Mason Crosby kick), 3:10. Lions 17–10. **Drive: 12 plays, 95 yards, 5:50.**

**Fourth quarter**

- GB – Mason Crosby 40-yard field goal, 12:07. Lions 17–13. **Drive: 12 plays, 51 yards, 4:32.**
- DET – Matt Prater 56-yard field goal, 11:08. Lions 20–13. **Drive: 4 plays, 3 yards, 0:59.**
- GB – Allen Lazard 28-yard pass from Aaron Rodgers (Mason Crosby kick), 5:19. Tied 20–20. **Drive: 7 plays, 40 yards, 2:33.**
- GB – Mason Crosby 33-yard field goal, 0:00. Packers 23–20. **Drive: 8 plays, 53 yards, 1:20.**

**Top passers**

- GB – Aaron Rodgers – 27/55, 323 yards, 2 TD, INT
- DET – David Blough – 12/29, 122 yards, INT

**Top rushers**

- GB – Aaron Jones – 25 rushes, 100 yards
- DET – Ty Johnson – 3 rushes, 65 yards

**Top receivers**

- GB – Davante Adams – 7 receptions, 93 yards, TD
- DET – Kenny Golladay – 3 receptions, 72 yards

With the win, the Packers finished the season 13–3, achieving their best record since 2011, and gave the Packers their first division sweep since 2011 as well. They also clinched the #2 seed in the NFC playoffs and earned a first-round bye, although the San Francisco 49ers victory over the Seattle Seahawks prevented them from clinching home-field advantage throughout the playoffs.

=== Standings ===
==== Division ====
NFC North
	W	L	T	PCT	DIV	CONF	PF	PA	STK
^{(2)} Green Bay Packers	13	3	0	.813	6–0	10–2	376	313	W5
^{(6)} Minnesota Vikings	10	6	0	.625	2–4	7–5	407	303	L2
Chicago Bears	8	8	0	.500	4–2	7–5	280	298	W1
Detroit Lions	3	12	1	.219	0–6	2–9–1	341	423	L9

==== Conference ====
NFC
#	Team	Division	W	L	T	PCT	DIV	CONF	SOS	SOV	STK
**Division leaders**
1 (Note: San Francisco finished ahead of Green Bay and New Orleans based on head-to-head sweep, claiming the No. 1 seed.)	San Francisco 49ers	West	13	3	0	.813	5–1	10–2	.504	.466	W2
2 (Note: Green Bay claimed the No. 2 seed over New Orleans based on conference record.)	Green Bay Packers	North	13	3	0	.813	6–0	10–2	.453	.428	W5
3	New Orleans Saints	South	13	3	0	.813	5–1	9–3	.486	.459	W3
4	Philadelphia Eagles	East	9	7	0	.563	5–1	7–5	.455	.417	W4
**Wild Cards**
5	Seattle Seahawks	West	11	5	0	.688	3–3	8–4	.531	.463	L2
6	Minnesota Vikings	North	10	6	0	.625	2–4	7–5	.477	.356	L2
**Did not qualify for the postseason**
7	Los Angeles Rams	West	9	7	0	.563	3–3	7–5	.535	.438	W1
8 (Note: Chicago finished ahead of Dallas based on head-to-head victory.)	Chicago Bears	North	8	8	0	.500	4–2	7–5	.508	.383	W1
9	Dallas Cowboys	East	8	8	0	.500	5–1	7–5	.479	.316	W1
10 (Note: Atlanta finished ahead of Tampa Bay based on division record.)	Atlanta Falcons	South	7	9	0	.438	4–2	6–6	.545	.518	W4
11	Tampa Bay Buccaneers	South	7	9	0	.438	2–4	5–7	.500	.384	L2
12	Arizona Cardinals	West	5	10	1	.344	1–5	3–8–1	.529	.375	L1
13	Carolina Panthers	South	5	11	0	.313	1–5	2–10	.549	.469	L8
14	New York Giants	East	4	12	0	.250	2–4	3–9	.473	.281	L1
15	Detroit Lions	North	3	12	1	.219	0–6	2–9–1	.506	.375	L9
16	Washington Redskins	East	3	13	0	.188	0–6	2–10	.502	.281	L4
**Tiebreakers** (Note: When breaking ties for three or more teams under the NFL's rules, they are first broken within divisions, then comparing only the highest-ranked remaining team from each division.)

== Postseason ==
=== Schedule ===
Round	Date	Opponent (seed)	Result	Record	Venue	Recap
Wild Card	First-round bye					
Divisional	January 12, 2020	Seattle Seahawks (5)	W 28–23	1–0	Lambeau Field	Recap
NFC Championship	January 19, 2020	at San Francisco 49ers (1)	L 20–37	1–1	Levi's Stadium	Recap

=== Game summaries ===
==== NFC Divisional Playoffs: vs. (5) Seattle Seahawks ====
NFC Divisional Playoffs: (5) Seattle Seahawks at (2) Green Bay Packers – Game summary

Quarter	1	2	3	4	Total
Seahawks	3	0	14	6	23
Packers	7	14	7	0	28

at Lambeau Field, Green Bay, Wisconsin

- Date: January 12, 2020
- Game time: 5:40 p.m. CST/3:40 p.m. PST
- Game weather: Cloudy, 23 °F (−5 °C)
- Game attendance: 78,998
- Referee: Clete Blakeman
- TV announcers (Fox): Joe Buck, Troy Aikman, Erin Andrews, Chris Myers and Mike Pereira
- Recap, Game Book

Game information

First quarter

- GB – Davante Adams 20-yard pass from Aaron Rodgers (Mason Crosby kick), 10:37. Packers 7–0. Drive: 8 plays, 75 yards, 4:23.
- SEA – Jason Myers 45-yard field goal, 0:28. Packers 7–3. Drive: 6 plays, 32 yards, 1:38.

Second quarter

- GB – Aaron Jones 1-yard run (Mason Crosby kick), 9:49. Packers 14–3. Drive: 9 plays, 75 yards, 5:39.
- GB – Aaron Jones 1-yard run (Mason Crosby kick), 1:30. Packers 21–3. Drive: 11 plays, 60 yards, 4:13.

Third quarter

- SEA – Marshawn Lynch 1-yard run (Jason Myers kick), 9:44. Packers 21–10. Drive: 10 plays, 69 yards, 5:16.
- GB – Davante Adams 40-yard pass from Aaron Rodgers (Mason Crosby kick), 7:09. Packers 28–10. Drive: 5 plays, 75 yards, 2:35.
- SEA – Tyler Lockett 7-yard pass from Russell Wilson (Jason Myers kick), 0:39. Packers 28–17. Drive: 12 plays, 84 yards, 6:30.

Fourth quarter

- SEA – Marshawn Lynch 1-yard run (pass failed), 9:33. Packers 28–23. Drive: 9 plays, 79 yards, 4:28.

Top passers

- SEA – Russell Wilson – 21/31, 277 yards, TD
- GB – Aaron Rodgers – 16/27, 243 yards, 2 TD

Top rushers

- SEA – Russell Wilson – 7 rushes, 64 yards
- GB – Aaron Jones – 21 rushes, 62 yards, 2 TD

Top receivers

- SEA – Tyler Lockett – 9 receptions, 136 yards, TD
- GB – Davante Adams – 8 receptions, 160 yards, 2 TD

==== NFC Championship: at (1) San Francisco 49ers ====
NFC Championship: (2) Green Bay Packers at (1) San Francisco 49ers – Game summary

Quarter	1	2	3	4	Total
Packers	0	0	7	13	20
49ers	7	20	7	3	37

at Levi's Stadium, Santa Clara, California

- Date: January 19, 2020
- Game time: 5:40 p.m. CST/3:40 p.m. PST
- Game weather: Cloudy, 58 °F (14 °C)
- Game attendance: 72,211
- Referee: John Hussey
- TV announcers (Fox): Joe Buck, Troy Aikman, Erin Andrews, Chris Myers and Mike Pereira
- Recap, Game Book

Game information

First quarter

- SF – Raheem Mostert 36-yard run (Robbie Gould kick), 5:55. 49ers 7–0. Drive: 6 plays, 89 yards, 3:38.

Second quarter

- SF – Robbie Gould 54-yard field goal, 14:55. 49ers 10–0. Drive: 5 plays, 15 yards, 2:21.
- SF – Raheem Mostert 9-yard run (Robbie Gould kick), 9:12. 49ers 17–0. Drive: 6 plays, 37 yards, 3:20.
- SF – Robbie Gould 27-yard field goal, 1:57. 49ers 20–0. Drive: 8 plays, 66 yards, 3:42.
- SF – Raheem Mostert 18-yard run (Robbie Gould kick), 0:45. 49ers 27–0. Drive: 3 plays, 30 yards, 0:16.

Third quarter

- GB – Aaron Jones 9-yard pass from Aaron Rodgers (Mason Crosby kick), 8:44. 49ers 27–7. Drive: 11 plays, 75 yards, 6:16.
- SF – Raheem Mostert 22-yard run (Robbie Gould kick), 4:49. 49ers 34–7. Drive: 7 plays, 79 yards, 3:55.

Fourth quarter

- GB – Aaron Jones 1-yard run (pass failed), 14:35. 49ers 34–13. Drive: 10 plays, 75 yards, 5:14.
- GB – Jace Sternberger 8-yard pass from Aaron Rodgers (Mason Crosby kick), 8:13. 49ers 34–20. Drive: 7 plays, 92 yards, 3:12.
- SF – Robbie Gould 42-yard field goal, 3:31. 49ers 37–20. Drive: 10 plays, 49 yards, 4:42.

Top passers

- GB – Aaron Rodgers – 31/39, 326 yards, 2 TD, 2 INT
- SF – Jimmy Garoppolo – 6/8, 77 yards

Top rushers

- GB – Aaron Jones – 12 rushes, 56 yards, TD
- SF – Raheem Mostert – 29 rushes, 220 yards, 4 TD

Top receivers

- GB – Davante Adams – 9 receptions, 138 yards
- SF – Deebo Samuel – 2 receptions, 46 yards

== Statistics ==
=== Regular season ===
Offense

Pos.	Name	GS
QB	Aaron Rodgers	16
FB	Danny Vitale	4
RB	Aaron Jones; Jamaal Williams	16; 2
WR	Marquez Valdes-Scantling; Jake Kumerow; Allen Lazard	10; 4; 3
WR	Davante Adams; Geronimo Allison	12; 6
TE	Marcedes Lewis; Jace Sternberger	10; 1
TE	Robert Tonyan; Jimmy Graham	1; 10
LT	David Bakhtiari	16
LG	Lane Taylor; Elgton Jenkins	2; 14
C	Corey Linsley	16
RG	Billy Turner	16
RT	Bryan Bulaga	16

Defense

Pos.	Name	GS
NT	Kenny Clark	16
DE	Montravius Adams; Tyler Lancaster	2; 10
DE	Dean Lowry	16
OLB	Za'Darius Smith	16
OLB	Preston Smith	16
ILB	Blake Martinez	16
ILB	B. J. Goodson	11
CB	Tramon Williams; Kevin King	6; 14
CB	Jaire Alexander	16
S	Adrian Amos	16
S	Darnell Savage Jr.	16
S	Ibraheim Campbell; Tramon Williams	3; 1
S	Raven Greene; Will Redmond	1; 4

=== Postseason ===
Offense

Pos.	Name	GS
QB	Aaron Rodgers	2
RB	Aaron Jones	2
WR	Allen Lazard	2
WR	Davante Adams	2
TE	Marcedes Lewis	2
TE	Jimmy Graham; Jace Sternberger	1; 1
LT	David Bakhtiari	2
LG	Elgton Jenkins	2
C	Corey Linsley	2
RG	Billy Turner	2
RT	Jared Veldheer; Bryan Bulaga	1; 1

Defense

Pos.	Name	GS
NT	Kenny Clark	2
DE	Montravius Adams; Tyler Lancaster	1; 1
DE	Dean Lowry	2
OLB	Za'Darius Smith	2
OLB	Preston Smith	2
ILB	Blake Martinez	2
ILB	B. J. Goodson	1
CB	Kevin King	2
CB	Jaire Alexander	2
CB	Chandon Sullivan	1
S	Adrian Amos	2
S	Darnell Savage Jr.	2

=== Team leaders ===
Category	Player(s)	Value
Passing yards	Aaron Rodgers	4002
Passing touchdowns	Aaron Rodgers	26
Rushing yards	Aaron Jones	1084
Rushing touchdowns	Aaron Jones	16
Receptions	Davante Adams	83
Receiving yards	Davante Adams	997
Receiving touchdowns	Davante Adams; Jamaal Williams	5
Kickoff return yards	Tyler Ervin	267
Punt return yards	Tyler Ervin	115
Tackles	Blake Martinez	155
Sacks	Za'Darius Smith	13.5
Interceptions	Kevin King	5

=== League rankings ===
Category	Total yards	Yards per game	NFL rank (out of 32)
Passing offense	3733	233.3	17th
Rushing offense	1795	112.2	15th
Total offense	5528	345.5	18th
Passing defense	3721	232.6	14th
Rushing defense	1921	120.1	23rd
Total defense	5642	352.6	18th

Statistical values are correct as of Week 17

== Awards ==
Recipient	Award(s)
Davante Adams	Pro Bowler (alternate)
David Bakhtiari	Pro Bowler
Kenny Clark	Pro Bowler (alternate)
Aaron Jones	Week 5: NFC Offensive Player of the Week; Week 5: FedEx Ground Player of the Week; Week 8: NFC Offensive Player of the Week
Aaron Rodgers	Week 7: NFC Offensive Player of the Week; Week 7: FedEx Air Player of the Week; Week 8: FedEx Air Player of the Week; Pro Bowler (did not participate)
Preston Smith	Week 3: NFC Defensive Player of the Week
Za'Darius Smith	Pro Bowler (alternate)
