= Dean Lowry =

American football player (born 1994)

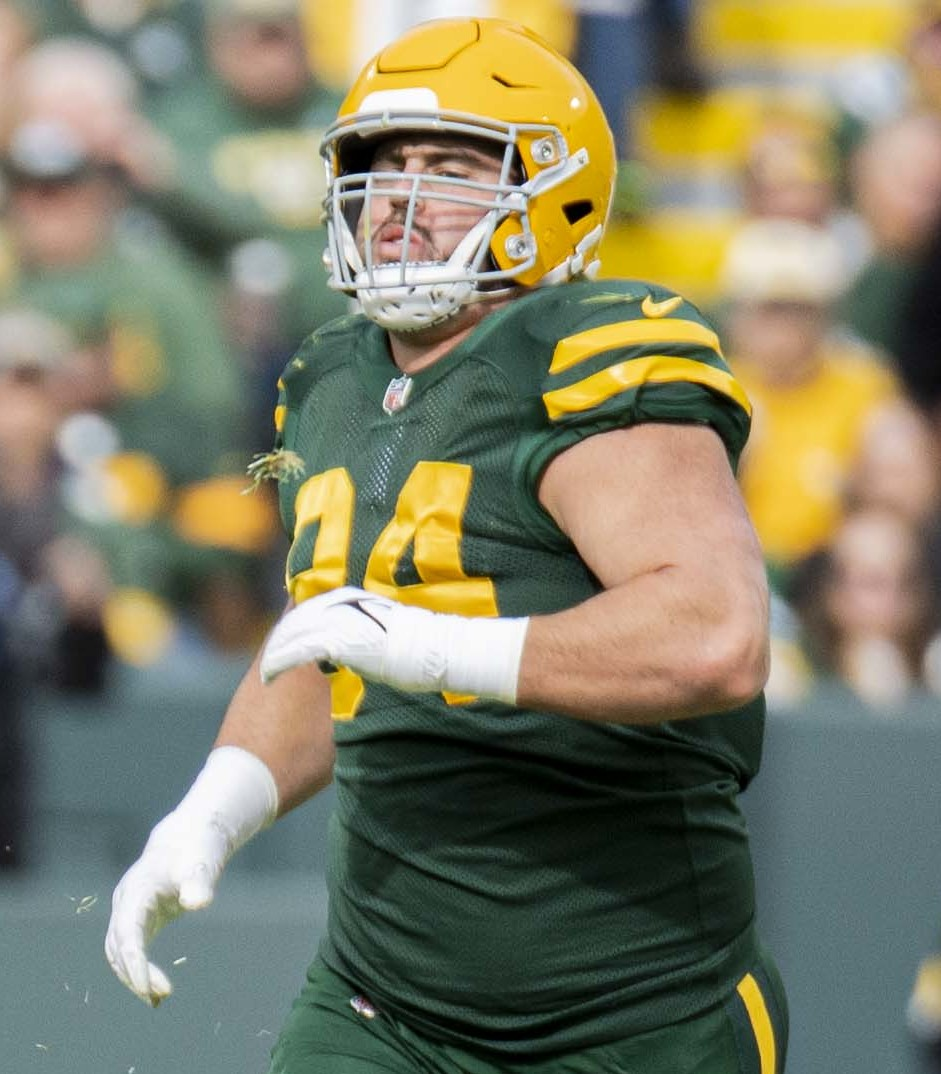
- Lowry with the Green Bay Packers in 2021

No. 75 – New York Giants
- Position: Defensive tackle
- Roster status: Practice squad

Personal information
- Born: June 9, 1994 (age 32); Rockford, Illinois, U.S.
- Listed height: 6 ft 6 in (1.98 m)
- Listed weight: 296 lb (134 kg)

Career information
- High school: Boylan Catholic (Rockford)
- College: Northwestern (2012–2015)
- NFL draft: 2016: 4th round, 137th overall pick

Career history
- Green Bay Packers (2016–2022); Minnesota Vikings (2023); Pittsburgh Steelers (2024–2025); New York Giants (2026–present)*
- * Offseason or practice squad member only

Awards and highlights
- Second-team All-Big Ten (2015)

Career NFL statistics as of 2025
- Total tackles: 271
- Sacks: 16.5
- Pass deflections: 18
- Forced fumbles: 1
- Fumble recoveries: 5
- Interceptions: 1
- Defensive touchdowns: 1
- Stats at Pro Football Reference

Dean Vincent Lowry (born June 9, 1994) is an American professional football defensive tackle for the New York Giants of the National Football League (NFL). He played college football for the Northwestern Wildcats, where he was a four-year starter. He was selected by the Green Bay Packers in the fourth round of the 2016 NFL draft.

== Early life ==
Lowry was born to Margaret and John Lowry and attended Boylan Central Catholic High School in Rockford, Illinois. Besides football, he lettered in baseball as a freshman and played basketball for one year. He was part of two undefeated teams. He was named as a SuperPrep All-Midwest honoree and an All-State selection by both the Chicago Tribune and Champaign-News Gazette. He finished his senior year with 65 tackles (21 for loss), and 10 sacks.

Lowry was ranked as the 34th defensive end in the country and the 17th best prospect in the state of Illinois. He was ranked as a three star recruit and received a number of scholarship offers from schools such as Northwestern, Ball State, Illinois State, Indiana, Iowa, Northern Illinois, Purdue, Vanderbilt, and Western Michigan. He committed to Northwestern on June 7, 2011.

== College career ==
Lowry ultimately elected to take the scholarship offer of Northwestern and played in all 13 games that year as a backup to future Minnesota Vikings defensive end Tyler Scott. During a game against Vanderbilt, he had one fumble recovery, one quarterback hurry, two solo tackles, and a pass deflection on the line of scrimmage. His efforts that year earned him ESPN.com Big Ten Conference All-Freshman Team honors.

Going into his second season with the Wildcats, Lowry started nine games at defensive end. While making his first start against Syracuse, he had his first career interception. He missed the game against Nebraska to injury; however, he did have his first career touchdown on an interception return against Maine. During a game against Ohio State, he had six tackles (5 solo) and recovered a fumble. He finished the year second on the team in tackles for loss with seven, and third on the team with 4.5 sacks.

Lowry started every game at defensive end in his junior season. During a game against Notre Dame, he recorded six tackles (1.5 for loss) and forced a fumble. During a game against Western Illinois, Lowry moved over to the defensive tackle spot and had four tackles, one sack, and two passes defensed. He was named the Defensive Player of the Game as a result of his performance. He was named to the Academic All-Big Ten team and an honorable mention by league coaches. He finished his junior year with 41 tackles with 8 for a loss, ranking second on the team.

In his final year with the team, Lowry set a single-game team record against Nebraska with six tackles for a loss. He also recorded two sacks in the game and was named the team's Defensive Player of the Game. He again picked up that honor in a game against the Duke Blue Devils, where he had six tackles with half of one for a loss. He was named as a consensus pick to the second-team All-Big Ten team.

== Professional career ==
=== Pre-draft ===
Pre-draft measurables
| Height | Weight | Arm length | Hand span | Wingspan | 40-yard dash | 10-yard split | 20-yard split | 20-yard shuttle | Three-cone drill | Vertical jump | Broad jump | Bench press |
|---|---|---|---|---|---|---|---|---|---|---|---|---|
| 6 ft 5 3/4 in (1.97 m) | 296 lb (134 kg) | 31 in (0.79 m) | 9 3/8 in (0.24 m) | 6 ft 4 1/8 in (1.93 m) | 4.87 s | 1.70 s | 2.81 s | 4.38 s | 7.26 s | 32.5 in (0.83 m) | 9 ft 6 in (2.90 m) | 30 reps |
All values from NFL Combine

Dane Brugler of CBS Sports commented that Lowry was "heavy-handed" and used his momentum and size to compete against blockers and that he played to the best of his ability on every play. He also cited concerns about his lack of explosiveness and pass-rush moves. He also believed he would be a backup in the National Football League (NFL).

=== Green Bay Packers ===
Lowry was selected by the Green Bay Packers in the fourth round (137 overall) of the 2016 NFL draft with the second of two compensatory picks. Rob Demovsky, a staff writer for ESPN, commented that he was surprised that general manager Ted Thompson ignored the offense this far in the draft. He also mentioned that the Packers liked his athleticism. Eliot Wolf, president of the Green Bay Packers football operations, said in the regards to his pick that he believed Lowry was "an underrated athlete". On May 6, 2016, he signed a contract with the Packers. Lowry recorded his first NFL sack against the Houston Texans on December 4, 2016. He also recorded a deflected pass and a handful of tackles in that game. On December 3, 2017, in a 26–20 victory over the Tampa Bay Buccaneers, Lowry recovered a Jameis Winston fumble and returned it for the first touchdown in his career in the NFL. Lowry was awarded NFC Defensive Player of the Week for this performance.

On July 23, 2019, Lowry signed a three-year, $20.325 million contract extension with the Packers. In week 15 of the 2019 season against the Chicago Bears, Lowry recorded his first career interception off a pass thrown by Mitch Trubisky during the 21–13 win. He was placed on injured reserve on December 27, 2022.

=== Minnesota Vikings ===
On March 20, 2023, Lowry signed a two-year contract with the Minnesota Vikings. On November 19, he suffered a pectoral injury against the Denver Broncos. Lowry was placed on the injured reserve list the next day. He was released on March 12, 2024.

=== Pittsburgh Steelers ===
On April 1, 2024, Lowry signed with the Pittsburgh Steelers. He made 12 appearances (one start) for Pittsburgh, recording one pass deflection, one sack, and five combined tackles.

On August 5, 2025, it was announced that Lowry would miss the entirety of the 2025 season due to a ACL tear he suffered during a training camp practice.

On May 26, 2026, Lowry re-signed with the Steelers on a one-year contract. He was released by Pittsburgh as a part of final roster cuts on August 30.

=== New York Giants ===
On October 27, 2026, Lowry signed with the New York Giants practice squad.

== NFL career statistics ==
=== Regular season ===
| Year | Team | Games | | Tackles | | | | Interceptions | | | | Fumbles | | | |
| Year | Team | GP | GS | Total | Solo | Ast | Sck | PD | Int | Yds | TD | FF | FR | Yds | TD |
|---|---|---|---|---|---|---|---|---|---|---|---|---|---|---|---|
| 2016 | GB | 15 | 0 | 8 | 6 | 2 | 2.0 | 1 | 0 | 0 | 0 | 0 | 0 | 0 | 0 |
| 2017 | GB | 16 | 11 | 32 | 18 | 14 | 2.0 | 2 | 0 | 0 | 0 | 0 | 1 | 62 | 1 |
| 2018 | GB | 16 | 8 | 44 | 31 | 13 | 3.0 | 3 | 0 | 0 | 0 | 1 | 1 | 0 | 0 |
| 2019 | GB | 16 | 16 | 47 | 23 | 24 | 0.0 | 3 | 1 | 7 | 0 | 0 | 1 | 0 | 0 |
| 2020 | GB | 16 | 16 | 36 | 14 | 22 | 3.0 | 2 | 0 | 0 | 0 | 0 | 0 | 0 | 0 |
| 2021 | GB | 17 | 17 | 42 | 24 | 18 | 5.0 | 4 | 0 | 0 | 0 | 0 | 1 | 2 | 0 |
| 2022 | GB | 15 | 12 | 43 | 23 | 20 | 0.5 | 1 | 0 | 0 | 0 | 0 | 0 | 0 | 0 |
| 2023 | MIN | 9 | 4 | 14 | 4 | 10 | 0.0 | 1 | 0 | 0 | 0 | 0 | 1 | 0 | 0 |
| 2024 | PIT | 12 | 1 | 5 | 1 | 4 | 1.0 | 1 | 0 | 0 | 0 | 0 | 0 | 0 | 0 |
| 2025 | PIT | 0 | 0 | Did not play due to injury | | | | | | | | | | | |
| Total | | 132 | 85 | 271 | 144 | 127 | 16.5 | 18 | 1 | 7 | 0 | 1 | 5 | 64 | 1 |
Source: pro-football-reference.com

=== Postseason ===
| Year | Team | Games | | Tackles | | | | Interceptions | | | | Fumbles | | | |
| Year | Team | GP | GS | Total | Solo | Ast | Sck | PD | Int | Yds | TD | FF | FR | Yds | TD |
|---|---|---|---|---|---|---|---|---|---|---|---|---|---|---|---|
| 2016 | GB | 3 | 0 | 1 | 1 | 0 | 0.0 | 0 | 0 | 0 | 0 | 0 | 0 | 0 | 0 |
| 2019 | GB | 2 | 2 | 3 | 2 | 1 | 0.0 | 0 | 0 | 0 | 0 | 0 | 0 | 0 | 0 |
| 2020 | GB | 2 | 2 | 7 | 3 | 4 | 0.0 | 0 | 0 | 0 | 0 | 0 | 0 | 0 | 0 |
| 2021 | GB | 1 | 1 | 4 | 1 | 3 | 0.0 | 1 | 0 | 0 | 0 | 0 | 0 | 0 | 0 |
| Total | | 8 | 5 | 15 | 7 | 8 | 0.0 | 1 | 0 | 0 | 0 | 0 | 0 | 0 | 0 |
Source: pro-football-reference.com

== Personal life ==
At Northwestern University, Lowry majored in economics with a minor in business institutions.
