= Tra Carson =

American football player (born 1992)

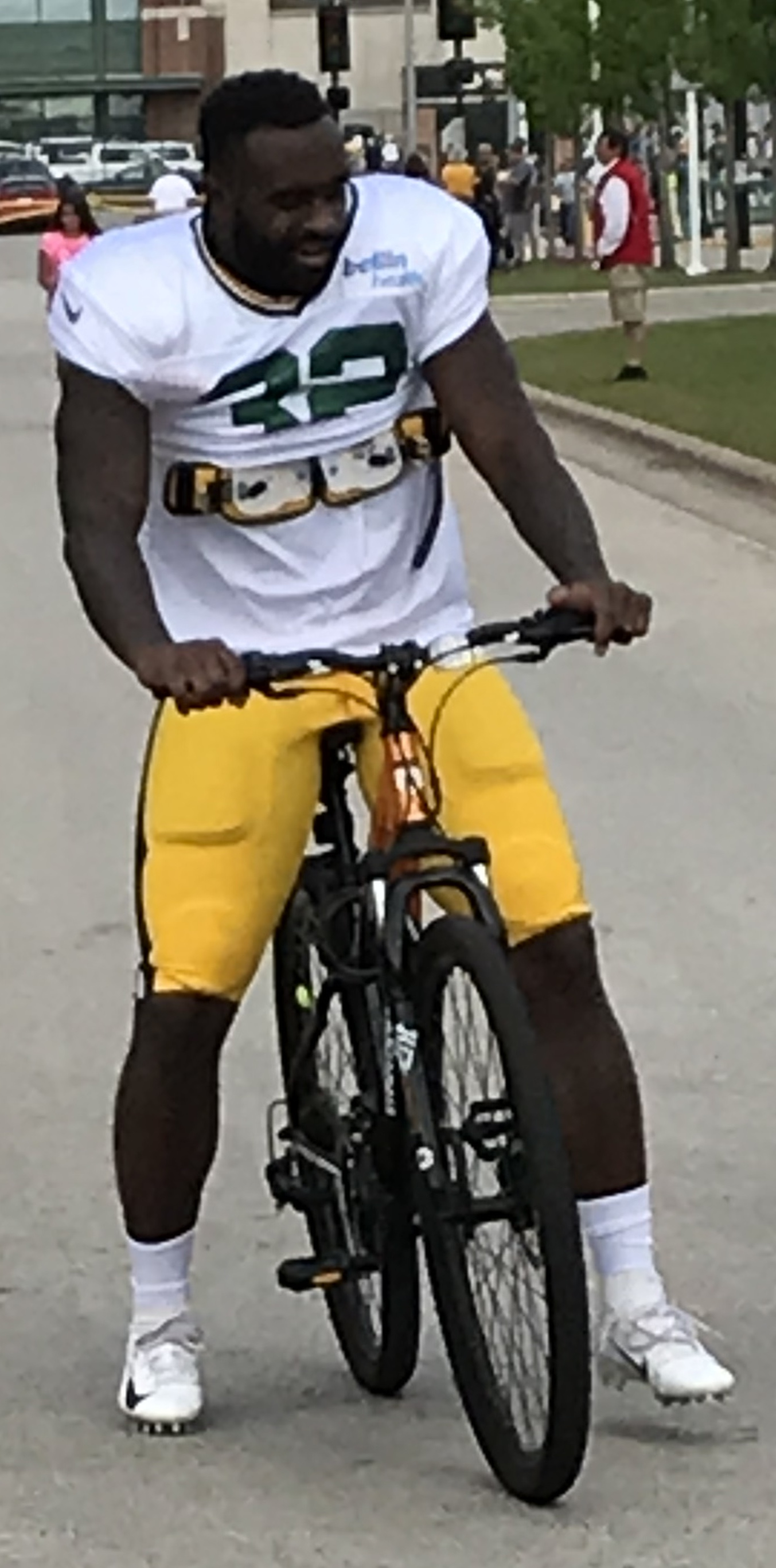
- Carson in 2019

No. 39, 33, 32, 34
- Position: Running back

Personal information
- Born: October 24, 1992 (age 34); Texarkana, Texas, U.S.
- Listed height: 5 ft 11 in (1.80 m)
- Listed weight: 228 lb (103 kg)

Career information
- High school: Liberty-Eylau (Texarkana)
- College: Texas A&M
- NFL draft: 2016: undrafted

Career history
- Cincinnati Bengals (2016–2018); Green Bay Packers (2018–2019); Detroit Lions (2019)

Career NFL statistics
- Rushing attempts: 18
- Rushing yards: 48
- Receptions: 4
- Receiving yards: 18
- Stats at Pro Football Reference

Tra Carson (born October 24, 1992) is an American former professional football player who was a running back in the National Football League (NFL). He played college football for the Texas A&M Aggies and was signed by the Cincinnati Bengals as an undrafted free agent in 2016.

== College career ==
Carson played three seasons for Texas A&M (2013–15) after beginning his career at Oregon (2011) where he had one touchdown on 45 carries for 254 yards with an averageof 5.6 yards per carry. He sat out the 2012 season on account the NCAA transfer rules, after playing in 10 games for Oregon in 2011. He saw action in 36 games for A&M, logging 19 rushing touchdowns and 2,075 rushing yards, with averages of 4.7 yards per carry in 2014, and 4.8 yards per carry in 2015. He also had 41 receptions for 299 yards and one touchdown during his career for the Aggies. He was the leading rusher on the team his junior (2014) and senior (2015) season. He capped his 2014 junior season with 133-yard rushing performance in the Liberty Bowl win over West Virginia earning him the offensive MVP of the bowl game. His senior season he rushed for 1,165 yards and seven touchdowns in 2015 being the first Aggie running back to rush for 1,000 yards in the SEC, and added 29 receptions for 183 yards and one touchdown. Carson majored in recreation, parks, and tourism sciences at Texas A&M.

== Professional career ==
=== Cincinnati Bengals ===
Carson was signed by the Cincinnati Bengals as an undrafted free agent on April 30, 2016. On September 3, 2016, he was waived by the Bengals and was signed to their practice squad the next day. He was promoted to the active roster on December 30, 2016.

On September 2, 2017, Carson was placed on injured reserve.

On September 19, 2018, Carson was waived/injured by the Bengals after suffering a hamstring injury in practice and was placed on injured reserve. He was released on September 28, 2018.

=== Green Bay Packers ===
Carson was signed to the Green Bay Packers practice squad on October 9, 2018. On October 31, 2018, he was promoted to the active roster from the practice squad. He was placed on injured reserve on December 5, 2018, with a ribs injury.

On August 31, 2019, Carson was waived by the Packers and was signed to the practice squad the next day. He was promoted to the active roster on October 5, 2019. He was waived on October 16.

=== Detroit Lions ===
On October 17, 2019, Carson was claimed off waivers by the Detroit Lions. He was placed on injured reserve on November 2, 2019, with a hamstring injury. He was released on November 8. On January 7, 2020, he signed a reserve/future contract with the Lions. He was released on April 27, 2020.

== NFL career statistics ==
Year	Team	Games		Rushing					Receiving					Fumbles	
Year	Team	GP	GS	Att	Yds	Avg	Lng	TD	Rec	Yds	Avg	Lng	TD	Fum	Lost
2018	CIN	2	0	0	0	0.0	0	0	0	0	0.0	0	0	0	0
2018	GB	4	0	0	0	0.0	0	0	0	0	0.0	0	0	0	0
2019	GB	2	0	6	14	2.3	7	0	4	18	4.5	8	0	0	0
2019	DET	1	1	12	34	2.8	12	0	0	0	0.0	0	0	0	0
Total		9	1	18	48	2.7	12	0	4	18	4.5	8	0	0	0
Source: NFL.com
