= Will Redmond =

American football player (born 1993)

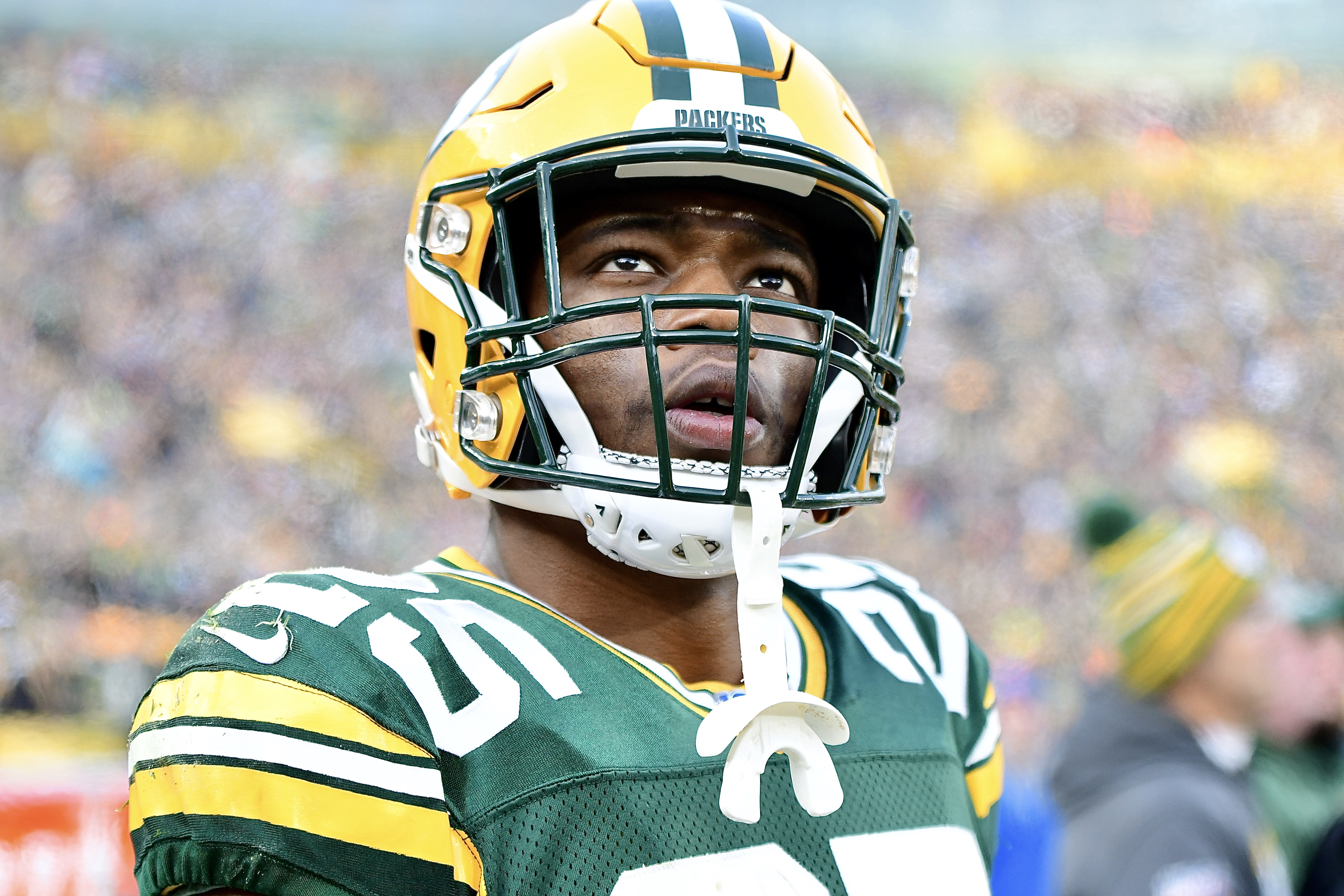
- Redmond with the Green Bay Packers in 2019

No. 23, 25, 29, 22
- Position: Safety

Personal information
- Born: December 28, 1993 (age 32); Memphis, Tennessee, U.S.
- Listed height: 5 ft 11 in (1.80 m)
- Listed weight: 186 lb (84 kg)

Career information
- High school: East (Memphis)
- College: Mississippi State
- NFL draft: 2016: 3rd round, 68th overall pick

Career history
- San Francisco 49ers (2016–2017); Kansas City Chiefs (2017–2018)*; Green Bay Packers (2018–2021); Indianapolis Colts (2021–2022); Houston Texans (2022)
- * Offseason or practice squad member only

Career NFL statistics
- Total tackles: 67
- Pass deflections: 2
- Stats at Pro Football Reference

Will E. Redmond (born December 28, 1993) is an American former professional football player who was a safety in the National Football League (NFL). He played college football for the Mississippi State Bulldogs and was selected by the San Francisco 49ers in the third round of the 2016 NFL draft. Redmond was also a member of the Kansas City Chiefs, Green Bay Packers, Indianapolis Colts, and Houston Texans.

== Early life ==
Redmond first attended Manassas High School in Memphis, Tennessee, where he was the starting quarterback for the Tigers team documented in the Oscar-winning documentary film Undefeated. Redmond later transferred to East High School in Memphis, Tennessee, where played both sides of the ball and on special teams.

Redmond was rated as a four-star recruit by 247sports.com and Rivals.com, and a three-star recruit by ESPN. His scholarship offers included Cincinnati, Clemson, Georgia, Illinois, Louisville, Memphis, Miami, North Carolina, Notre Dame, Ohio State, Ole Miss, Purdue, Tennessee, Vanderbilt, and Virginia. Redmond committed to Mississippi State on August 1, 2011, and signed with the Bulldogs the following February, despite a late push from Georgia.

== College career ==
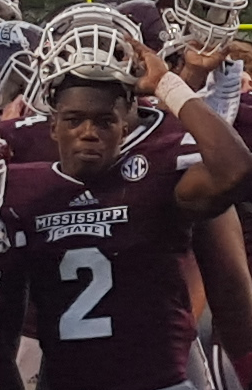
Redmond in 2015

Redmond's recruitment led to Mississippi State being placed on probation after it was revealed that a booster provided Redmond with cash, a credit card, and a $2,000 discount on a car. The university formally disassociated the booster. The NCAA declared Redmond ineligible for the 2012 season and the first five games of the 2013 season. He was also required to repay $2,660 in impermissible benefits.

Redmond made his college debut against Bowling Green in October 2013. Redmond recorded 23 tackles that season as a reserve defensive back.

Redmond played in every game for the Bulldogs in 2014. He caught the game-clinching interception in the end zone on the final play to preserve the Bulldogs' 34–29 upset win over LSU. Redmond repeated the feat a few weeks later with an end zone interception in the final minute of a 17–10 victory over Arkansas. He finished the season with 51 tackles and three interceptions.

On October 22, 2015, after playing in seven games, Redmond tore his ACL in practice. Redmond finished the season with 25 tackles and two interceptions.

== Professional career ==
=== Pre-draft ===
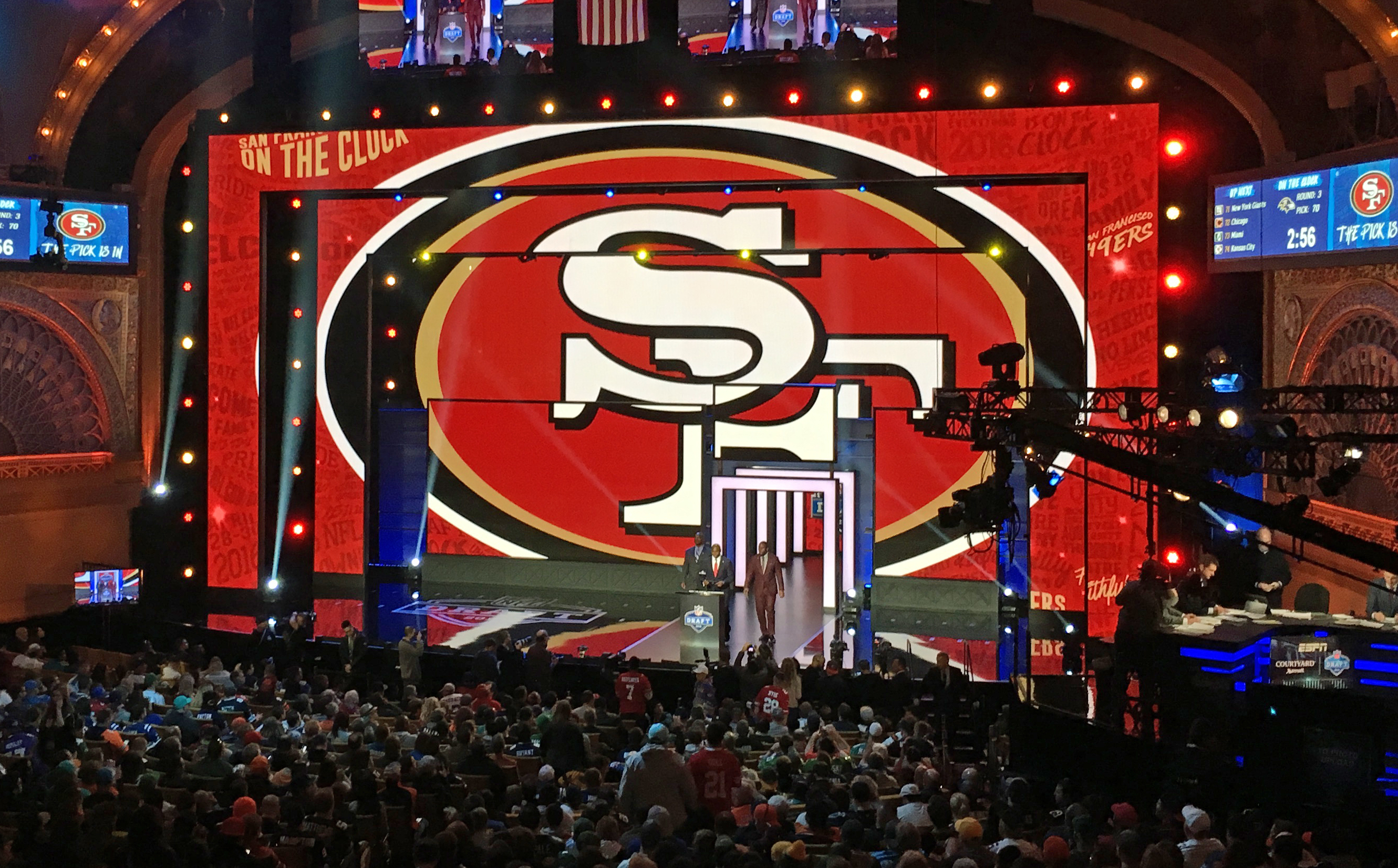
The 49ers announcing their selection of Redmond at the 2016 NFL Draft

Pre-draft measurables
Height	Weight	Arm length	Hand span
5 ft 10 3/4 in (1.80 m)	182 lb (83 kg)	30 3/8 in (0.77 m)	9 1/8 in (0.23 m)
All values from NFL Combine

Prior to the draft, Redmond was projected as one of the top cornerbacks in the 2016 NFL draft by Mel Kiper Jr. and as a first-round pick by Todd McShay, who remarked that Redmond showed "excellent quickness and agility, which is why he gives up little separation in man-to-man coverage".

=== San Francisco 49ers ===
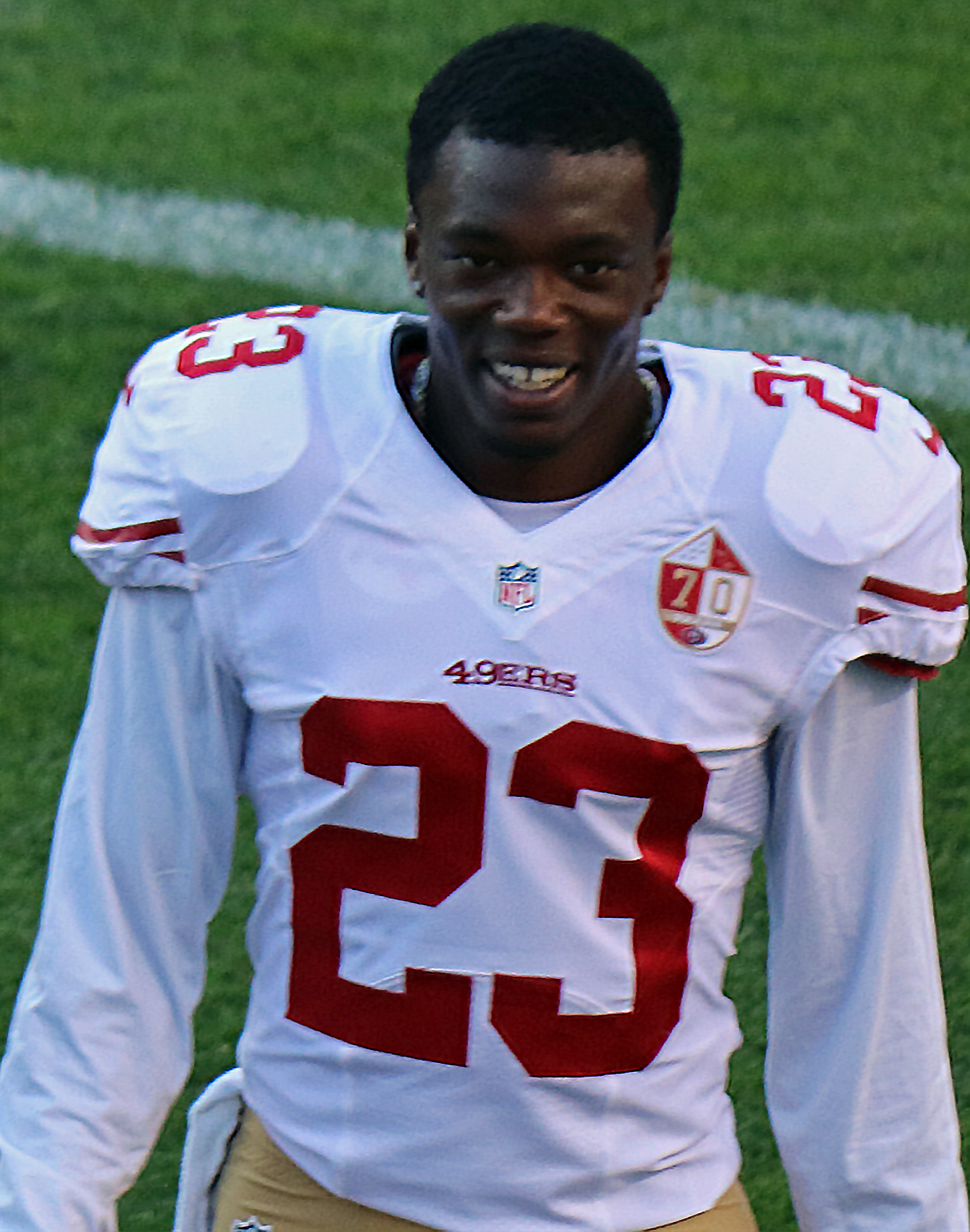
Redmond in 2016

Redmond was selected by the San Francisco 49ers in the third round (68th overall) of the 2016 NFL draft.

On September 5, 2016, Redmond was placed on injured reserve with a knee injury, ending his rookie season before it even started.

On September 1, 2017, Redmond was waived/injured by the 49ers and placed on injured reserve with an ankle injury. He was released on October 31.

=== Kansas City Chiefs ===
On November 9, 2017, Redmond was signed to the practice squad of the Kansas City Chiefs. He signed a reserve/future contract with the Chiefs on January 10, 2018. On September 1, Redmond was waived by the Chiefs.

=== Green Bay Packers ===
On September 11, 2018, Redmond was signed to the Green Bay Packers' practice squad. He was promoted to the active roster on November 6. On December 22, Redmond was placed on injured reserve with a shoulder injury.

On March 27, 2020, Redmond re-signed with the Packers.

Redmond re-signed with the team on April 2, 2021. He was placed on injured reserve with a toe injury on August 24. Redmond was released on November 22.

=== Indianapolis Colts ===
On December 15, 2021, Redmond was signed to the Indianapolis Colts' practice squad. He signed a reserve/future contract with Indianapolis on January 10, 2022. On August 30, Redmond was released by the Colts, but was re-signed to the team's practice squad the following day. He was released again on September 13.

=== Houston Texans ===
On November 15, 2022, Redmond signed with the practice squad of the Houston Texans.

== Career statistics ==
Legend
**Bold**	Career high

=== NFL ===
==== Regular season ====
Year	Team	Games		Tackles				Interceptions						Fumbles	
Year	Team	GP	GS	Comb	Solo	Ast	Sck	PD	Int	Yds	Avg	Lng	TD	FF	FR
2018	GB	5	0	1	1	0	0.0	0	0	0	0	0	0	0	0
2019	GB	13	4	**36**	**25**	**11**	0.0	**1**	0	0	0	0	0	0	0
2020	GB	13	1	28	21	7	0.0	**1**	0	0	0	0	0	0	0
2021	IND	3	0	0	0	0	0.0	0	0	0	0	0	0	0	0
2022	HOU	3	0	2	2	0	0.0	0	0	0	0	0	0	0	0
Career		37	5	67	49	18	0.0	2	0	0	0	0	0	0	0

==== Postseason ====
Year	Team	Games		Tackles				Interceptions						Fumbles	
Year	Team	GP	GS	Comb	Total	Ast	Sck	PD	Int	Yds	Avg	Lng	TD	FF	FR
2019	GB	2	0	**1**	**1**	0	0.0	0	0	0	0	0	0	0	0
2020	GB	2	0	0	0	0	0.0	0	0	0	0	0	0	0	0
Career		4	0	1	1	0	0.0	0	0	0	0	0	0	0	0

=== College ===
Year	Team	Games	Tackles	Int
2013	Mississippi State	8	23	0
2014	Mississippi State	13	**51**	**3**
2015	Mississippi State	7	25	2
**Career**		**28**	**99**	**5**
