= Kevin King (American football) =

American football player (born 1995)

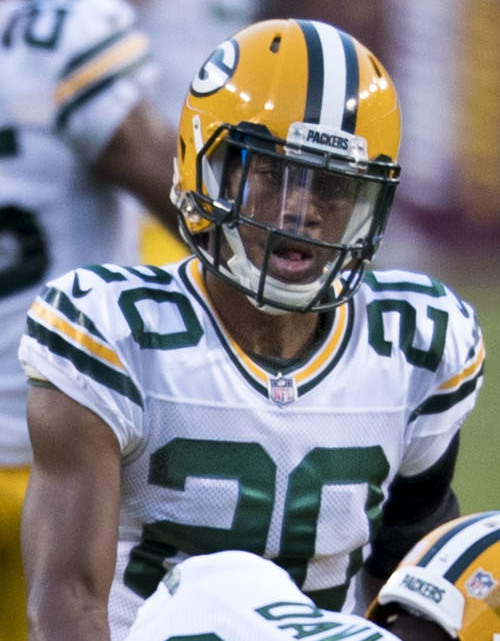
- King with the Green Bay Packers in 2017

Profile
- Position: Cornerback

Personal information
- Born: May 5, 1995 (age 31); Oakland, California, U.S.
- Listed height: 6 ft 3 in (1.91 m)
- Listed weight: 200 lb (91 kg)

Career information
- High school: Bishop O'Dowd (Oakland)
- College: Washington (2013–2016)
- NFL draft: 2017: 2nd round, 33rd overall pick

Career history
- Green Bay Packers (2017–2021); Atlanta Falcons (2024)

Career NFL statistics as of 2024
- Total tackles: 207
- Sacks: 1
- Forced fumbles: 2
- Fumble recoveries: 3
- Pass deflections: 32
- Interceptions: 7
- Stats at Pro Football Reference

Kevin Charles King (born May 5, 1995) is an American professional football cornerback. He played college football for the Washington Huskies, starting for four years as a safety and cornerback. He was selected by the Green Bay Packers in the second round of the 2017 NFL draft.

During his time with Washington, King often played as both a safety and a cornerback where he was a multiple time All-Pac-12 Conference honorable mention his last two years with the team. He played for the Packers for five seasons.

== Early life ==
King was born in Oakland, California and attended Bishop O'Dowd High School. As a child, he played baseball, basketball, and football and originally wanted to play quarterback but at 5'7, could not see over the offensive line. During his time in high school, he was coached by Hardy Nickerson, who played for the Packers in 2002. As a junior in high school, he had experienced a growth spurt and grew to 6'2. He commented that this growth spurt made him stop playing baseball and focus on football, as he was not sure how well he could play shortstop with the few extra inches of height. Prior to his senior year, he was named defensive most valuable player (MVP) at the Oakland Nike Football Training Camp. He finished the season with six interceptions, leading the team. He was named to the first-team All-NorCal and first-team Division three all-state by MaxPreps.com. In addition, he also won accolades in track and field in the 110-meter hurdles and the 300-meter hurdles.

King was highly recruited coming out of high school and was ranked as a three-star prospect by Rivals.com out of a possible five-star ranking, and as the number 73 overall recruit in California. He was recruited by Washington, California, West Virginia, and Arizona State. He stated that winning the MVP at the Nike Football Training Camp brought his "confidence up a bit" and that he now knew he could "play with those top guys." He ultimately committed to play at Washington because he felt that he could come in and play early due to the large amount of junior and senior defensive backs. He chose to major in American ethnic studies and retail management.

== College career ==
King played at Washington from 2013 to 2016. During his first year with the team, he played safety (although the team believed him to be more natural at cornerback) and saw snaps during each of the first seven games of the season. He was the first true freshman to start for the Huskies in 2013. He missed several games due to injury, including his first bowl game against BYU. Arguably his best game of the season came against the UCLA Bruins, where he finished with four tackles and a fumble recovery.

He continued to play safety his second year on the team and played in 13 games, starting 12 of them at the safety position. The only game he did not start was against Stanford, which he missed due to an illness. King recorded his first career interception in the Apple Cup against rival Washington State, and additionally recorded four tackles. He also forced another fumble, this time against Illinois. During the first bowl game of his college career, he registered nine tackles against Oklahoma State.

King continued to play well going into his junior year, as he made the switch to cornerback and recorded three interceptions in the first three games of the year playing in the nickel position. He had a team-high nine tackles (two for loss), a forced fumble, and a recovery against Washington State and finished the year sitting the bowl game out due to injury. His play resulted in him being made an honorable mention on the All-Pac-12 Conference team. Following this season, he considered coming out of school and declaring for the NFL draft but Huskies' co-defensive coordinator Jimmy Lake encouraged him to return for his senior year to build up more film as an outside corner which he believed was the most likely position he would play in the NFL.

As a senior, King started every game of the season at cornerback and finished the year with two interceptions, 44 tackles, and 3.5 for a loss. His efforts earned him a second All-Pac-12 honorable mention and an honorable mention on the Academic All-Pac-12 Team. One of his interceptions came against Arizona State in which he caught a one-handed interception on a fade pass from Manny Wilkins in a game that they ended up winning 44–18.

== Professional career ==
=== Pre-draft ===
King attended the NFL Scouting Combine and completed all of the combine drills. He ran the fastest three-cone drill and short shuttle of all defensive backs and tied for 11th among all defensive backs in the 40-yard dash. At the conclusion of the pre-draft process, King was projected to be a first or second round pick by NFL draft experts and scouts. He was ranked the third best cornerback prospect in the draft by NFLDraftScout.com, was ranked the fifth best cornerback by ESPN, was ranked the seventh best by Sports Illustrated, and was ranked as the fifth best cornerback, along with Tre'Davious White, by NFL analyst Mike Mayock.

External videos
- Kevin King runs a 4.43s 40-yard dash

Pre-draft measurables
Height	Weight	Arm length	Hand span	Wingspan	40-yard dash	10-yard split	20-yard split	20-yard shuttle	Three-cone drill	Vertical jump	Bench press	Wonderlic
6 ft 3 in (1.91 m)	200 lb (91 kg)	32 in (0.81 m)	9 1/2 in (0.24 m)	6 ft 5 7/8 in (1.98 m)	4.43 s	1.49 s	2.57 s	3.89 s	6.56 s	39.5 in (1.00 m)	11 reps	26
All values from NFL Combine

=== Green Bay Packers ===
The Green Bay Packers selected King in the second round (33rd overall) of the 2017 NFL draft. King was the sixth cornerback drafted in 2017. Packers director of football operations Eliot Wolf commented that he was excited to add someone with King's size to the team and that he was expected to come in and compete for a starting job right away.

External videos
- Packers draft Kevin King 33rd overall
- Mayock “King is today’s NFL corner
- Kevin King NFL Draft Interview

On May 11, 2017, the Packers signed King to a four-year, $7.08 million contract that includes $4.67 million guaranteed and a signing bonus of $3.28 million.

King was not able to attend organized team activities due to the leagues policy on colleges that followed the quarters system. Rookies are not able to join their team until their college has concluded their final semester. During that time frame, he worked heavily with cornerbacks coach Joe Whitt to get up to speed on the playbook over the phone and via Skype. Throughout training camp, King competed to a starting cornerback against Damarious Randall, Davon House, Quinten Rollins, and LaDarius Gunter. Head coach Mike McCarthy named King the fourth backup cornerback on the depth chart to start the regular season, behind Davon House, Damarious Randall, and Quinten Rollins.

He made his professional regular season debut in the Packers’ season-opening 17–9 victory against the Seattle Seahawks. On September 24, 2017, King earned his first career start after Davon House was sidelined due to a quadriceps injury. King finished the Packers’ 27–24 win against the Cincinnati Bengals with a season-high seven combined tackles (five solo). King was inactive for the Packers’ Week 6 loss at the Minnesota Vikings after suffering a concussion the previous game. He was sidelined for a Week 11 loss to the Baltimore Ravens due to a shoulder injury. He was also sidelined for a Week 13 win against the Tampa Bay Buccaneers after aggravating his shoulder injury. On December 6, 2017, the Green Bay Packers officially placed King on injured reserve due a lingering shoulder injury. King spent the majority of the season dealing with a shoulder injury that at times prevented him from lifting his arm above his head and that dislocated multiple times during the season. The following week, King underwent surgery by Dr. James Andrews to repair a torn labrum in his left shoulder. King finished his rookie season in 2017 with 28 combined tackles (22 solo) and five pass deflections in nine games and five starts.

==== 2018 ====
External videos
- King makes last second INT to seal Packers’ win

King rehabbed throughout the offseason and returned in time to participate in organized team activities. During training camp, King competed for a job as a starting cornerback against Davon House, Tramon Williams, Jaire Alexander, and Josh Jackson. Head coach Mike McCarthy named King and Tramon Williams the starting cornerbacks to start the regular season. King was inactive for two games (Weeks 3–4) due to a groin injury. On October 15, 2018, King made four solo tackles, broke up a pass, and made his first career interception during a 33–30 victory against the San Francisco 49ers in Week 6. King intercepted a pass by 49ers’ quarterback C. J. Beathard, that was originally intended for wide receiver Marquise Goodwin during the fourth quarter to seal the Packers’ victory. He suffered a hamstring injury in Week 9 and missed the next four games before being placed on injured reserve on December 5, 2018.

==== 2019 ====
In King's return from injury in Week 1, he made 5 tackles and sacked Mitchell Trubisky once as the Packers beat the Chicago Bears 10–3. In Week 2 against the Minnesota Vikings, King recorded one tackle a pass breakup and a crucial fourth quarter interception in the end zone off a pass thrown by Kirk Cousins. In Week 5 against the Dallas Cowboys, King recorded an interception off Dak Prescott in the 34–24 win. In Week 16 against the Minnesota Vikings on Monday Night Football, King recorded another interception off a pass thrown by Kirk Cousins which he returned for 39 yards during the 23–10 win.

==== 2020 ====
In Week 15 against the Carolina Panthers, King recovered a fumble lost by Teddy Bridgewater at the 1-yard line and made a 48-yard return during the 24–16 win.

In the NFC Championship Game against the Buccaneers, King struggled throughout the game, failing to making a tackle to stop a rushing touchdown, and allowing two touchdowns in the air, including one to end the first half with no time on the clock in a prevent defense, and he was involved in a controversial pass interference on Tyler Johnson on a critical third-and-four from the Tampa Bay 37-yard line with 1:46 left in the 4th quarter - this penalty sealed the game as Tampa was able to run out the clock by keeping possession with the penalty. His miscues, plus other miscues by the Packers, would haunt them, as the Packers would lose 31–26.

==== 2021 ====
On March 26, 2021, King signed a one-year, $6 million contract with the Packers. He was named the second cornerback on the depth chart to begin the season, ahead of Chandon Sullivan and rookie Eric Stokes. After a disastrous first two games, where he allowed 6 catches for 153 yards and a touchdown on 7 targets, King was benched late in the Week 2 victory against the Detroit Lions for the rookie first-round pick Stokes. Stokes played well in relief, and produced 3 pass breakups, including 2 on fourth down. King was declared inactive due to an illness ahead of the Packers' Week 3 game against the San Francisco 49ers, and also missed the Week 4 game against the Pittsburgh Steelers, during which first-string cornerback Jaire Alexander was injured and placed on injured reserve (he would not play another regular season snap), presenting King with an opportunity to return to a starting role.

King returned to action for the Packers' Week 5 game against the Cincinnati Bengals, but left the game with a shoulder injury. In Week 6, cornerback Rasul Douglas played well as King was still nursing his shoulder injury, and was named the Packers' starting cornerback opposite Stokes. In Week 9, King returned to play against the Kansas City Chiefs with Stokes injured in pregame warmups. In Week 10, King intercepted a pass by Seattle Seahawks quarterback Russell Wilson in the endzone to preserve a 17–0 shutout victory. However, starting in Week 10, King would not exceed 40% of defensive snaps played for the Packers.

=== 2022 ===
King elected to skip the 2022 season in order to get “healthy”, at the time having missed 29 of a possible 80 games played in his career.

=== 2023 ===
King announced on May 6, 2023, that he had suffered a torn Achilles tendon while working out to get himself in shape to be in an NFL training camp.

=== Atlanta Falcons ===
On April 8, 2024, King signed with the Atlanta Falcons. He was released on August 27, and re-signed to the practice squad. He was promoted to the active roster on September 16. He was released on October 11 and re-signed to the practice squad the following day. He was promoted back to the active roster on October 19.

On April 11, 2025, King re-signed with the Falcons on a one-year contract. He was released on July 24.

== NFL career statistics ==
=== Regular season ===
Year	Team	Games		Tackles					Interceptions						Fumbles	
Year	Team	GP	GS	Cmb	Solo	Ast	Sck	SFTY	PD	Int	Yds	Avg	Lng	TD	FF	FR
2017	GB	9	5	28	22	6	0.0	0	5	0	0	0	0	0	0	0
2018	GB	6	6	17	14	3	0.0	0	2	1	0	0	0	0	0	1
2019	GB	15	14	66	56	10	1.0	0	15	5	54	10.8	39	0	1	0
2020	GB	11	11	57	45	12	0.0	0	5	0	0	0	0	0	1	1
2021	GB	10	6	29	21	8	0.0	0	3	1	0	0	0	0	0	0
Total		51	42	197	158	39	1.0	0	30	7	54	7.7	39	0	2	2
Source: pro-football-reference.com

=== Postseason ===
Year	Team	Games		Tackles					Interceptions						Fumbles	
Year	Team	GP	GS	Cmb	Solo	Ast	Sck	SFTY	PD	Int	Yds	Avg	Lng	TD	FF	FR
2019	GB	2	2	6	6	0	0.0	0	2	0	0	0.0	0	0	0	0
2020	GB	2	2	12	9	3	0.0	0	0	0	0	0.0	0	0	0	0
2021	GB	1	0	2	1	1	0.0	0	0	0	0	0.0	0	0	0	0
Total		5	4	20	16	4	0.0	0	2	0	0	0.0	0	0	0	0
Source: pro-football-reference.com
