= Preston Smith (linebacker) =

American football player (born 1992)

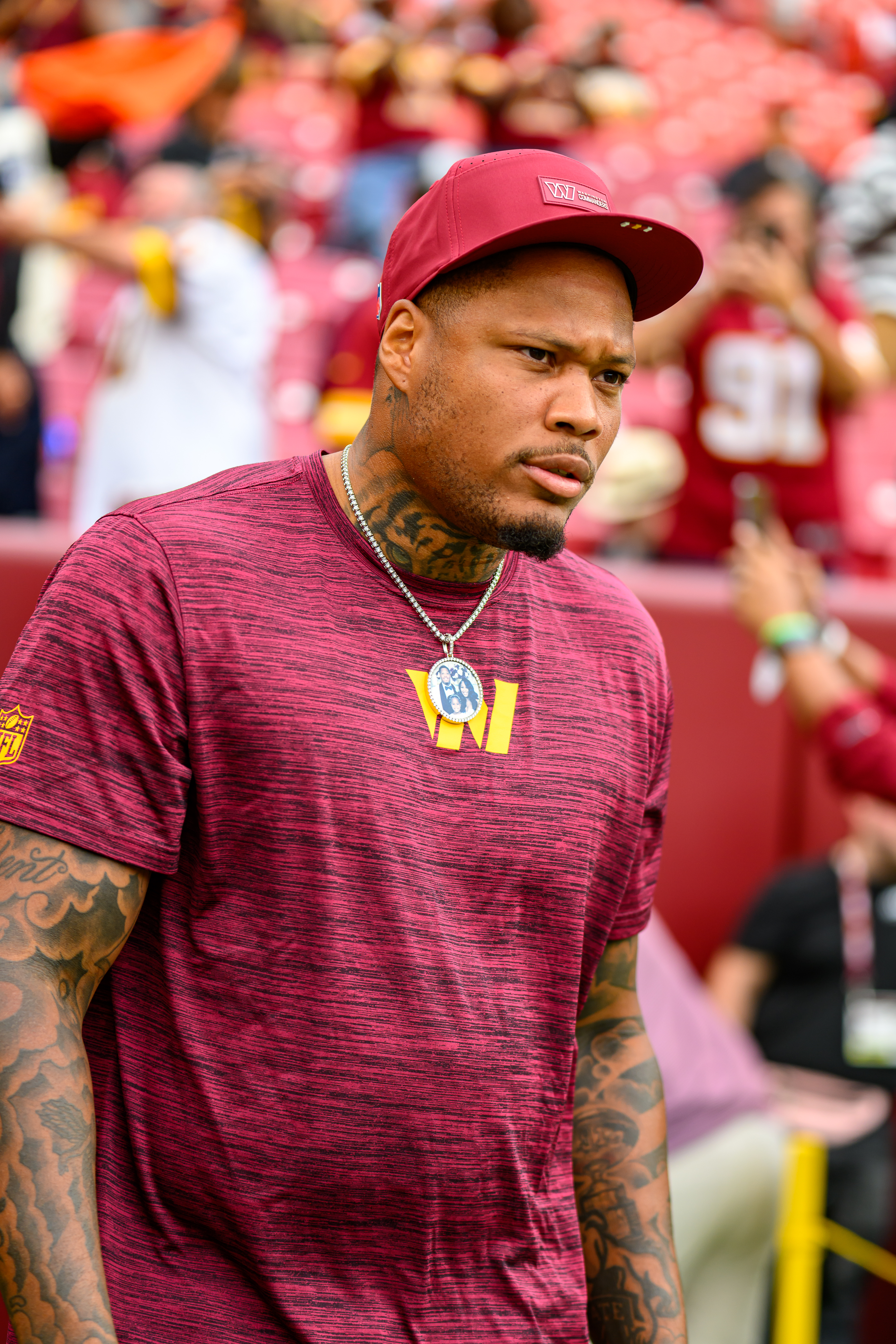
- Smith with the Washington Commanders in 2025

Profile
- Position: Linebacker

Personal information
- Born: November 17, 1992 (age 33); Atlanta, Georgia, U.S.
- Listed height: 6 ft 5 in (1.96 m)
- Listed weight: 265 lb (120 kg)

Career information
- High school: Stephenson (Stone Mountain, Georgia)
- College: Mississippi State (2011–2014)
- NFL draft: 2015: 2nd round, 38th overall pick

Career history
- Washington Redskins (2015–2018); Green Bay Packers (2019–2024); Pittsburgh Steelers (2024); Washington Commanders (2025)

Awards and highlights
- First-team All-SEC (2014)

Career NFL statistics as of 2025
- Total tackles: 467
- Sacks: 71
- Forced fumbles: 10
- Fumble recoveries: 7
- Pass deflections: 28
- Interceptions: 5
- Defensive touchdowns: 2
- Stats at Pro Football Reference

Preston Demarquis Smith (born November 17, 1992) is an American professional football linebacker. He played college football for the Mississippi State Bulldogs and was selected by the Washington Redskins in the second round of the 2015 NFL draft. Smith has also been a member of the Green Bay Packers and Pittsburgh Steelers.

== Early life ==
Smith was born on November 17, 1992, in Atlanta, Georgia. attended Stephenson High School in Stone Mountain, Georgia. He was rated as a two-star recruit by 247sports.com, and Scout.com, and a three-star recruit by Rivals.com. He chose to play for the Mississippi State Bulldogs over offers from Kentucky, Syracuse, and West Virginia, among others.

== College career ==
Smith appeared in 8 games as a true freshman in 2011 season, recording a forced fumble in a 31–3 win over Ole Miss in the Egg Bowl. In 2012, Smith appeared in all 13 games and led the Bulldogs with 4.5 sacks. As a junior in 2013, Smith recorded 2.5 sacks, including 2.0 in a 59–26 loss to LSU.

Smith started the 2014 season with a bang, winning the Southeastern Conference Defensive Lineman of the Week Award in each of the first three weeks. Smith recorded an interception in the Bulldogs' 49–0 rout of Southern Miss, and returned another acrobatic, one-handed interception for a touchdown in the Bulldogs' win over UAB. Smith ended the season with 42 tackles, nine sacks, two interceptions and a touchdown.

At the end of his senior season, Smith was projected as a fourth-round pick in the 2015 NFL draft by CBS and NFL Draft Scout.

== Professional career ==
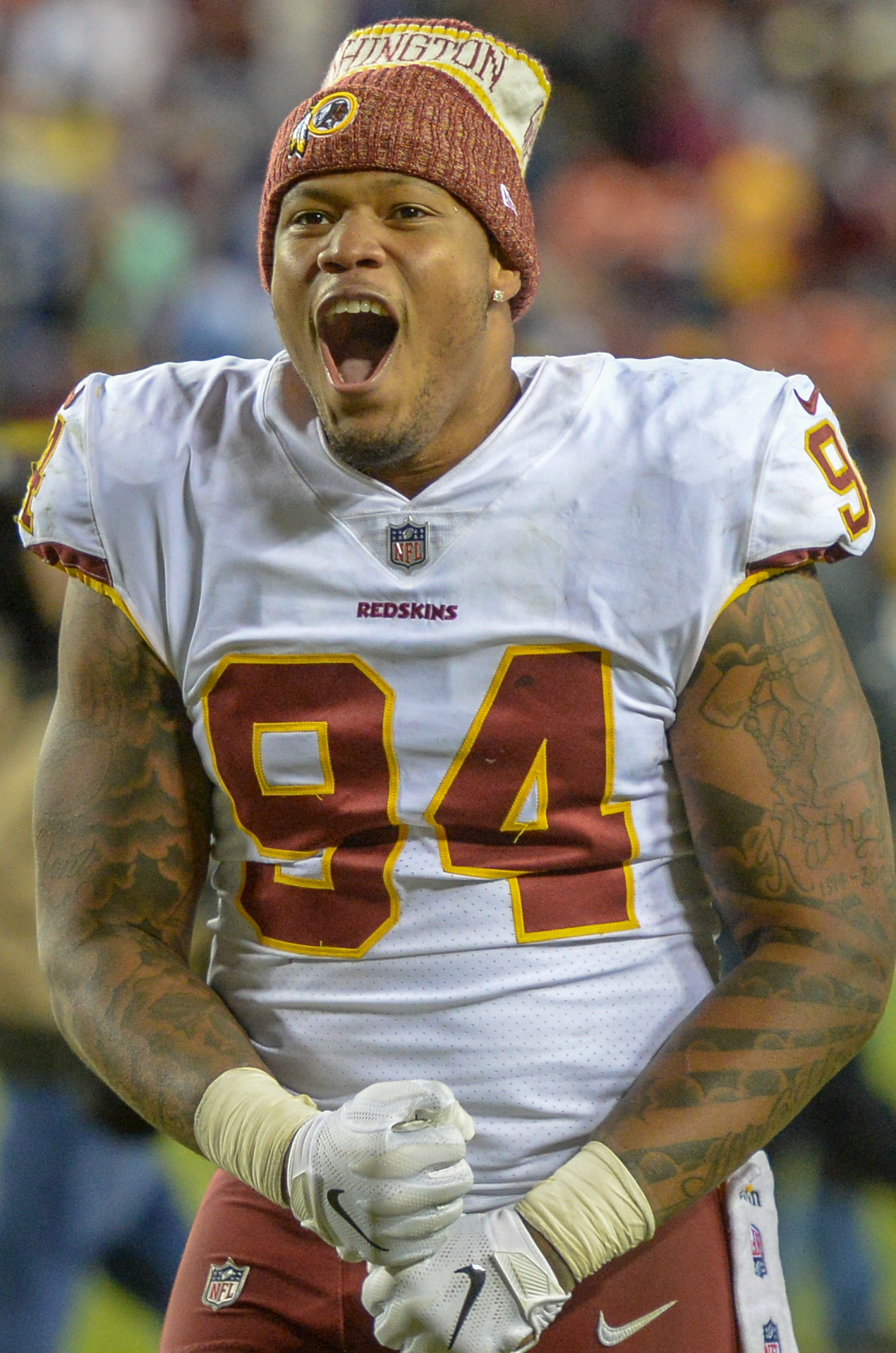
Smith with the Washington Redskins in 2018

Pre-draft measurables
Height	Weight	Arm length	Hand span	40-yard dash	10-yard split	20-yard split	20-yard shuttle	Three-cone drill	Vertical jump	Broad jump	Bench press
6 ft 4 7/8 in (1.95 m)	271 lb (123 kg)	34 in (0.86 m)	10 5/8 in (0.27 m)	4.74 s	1.60 s	2.73 s	4.28 s	7.07 s	34 in (0.86 m)	10 ft 1 in (3.07 m)	24 reps
All values from NFL Combine

=== Washington Redskins ===
==== 2015 ====
The Washington Redskins selected Smith in the second round with the 38th overall pick in the 2015 NFL draft. Smith was the seventh defensive end drafted in 2015.

On May 11, 2015, the Redskins signed Smith to a four-year, $5.77 million contract that includes $3.16 million guaranteed and a signing bonus of $2.46 million. Throughout training camp, Smith competed to be the backup right outside linebacker against veteran Trent Murphy. Head coach Jay Gruden named Smith the backup right outside linebacker to start the regular season, behind Murphy, after Junior Galette sustained a season-ending injury.

He made his professional regular season debut in the Washington Redskins' season opener against the Miami Dolphins and made two solo tackles, forced two fumbles, a fumble recovery, and made his first career sack as they lost 17–10. During the third quarter, Smith recovered a fumble he caused while making his first career sack on quarterback Ryan Tannehill for a 13-yard loss. In Week 13, Smith earned his first career start and recorded one solo tackle as the Redskins earned a 24–21 victory at the Chicago Bears. On December 26, 2015, Smith tied his record of four combined tackles (three solo) and also had three sacks on Sam Bradford during a 38–24 victory at the Philadelphia Eagles in Week 16. His performance earned him the Pepsi NFL Rookie of the Week. He finished his rookie campaign with 35 combined tackles (24 solo), eight sacks, four pass deflections, three forced fumbles, and a fumble recovery in 16 games and 2 starts.

The Redskins finished first in the NFC East with a 9–7 record and clinched a playoff berth. On January 10, 2016, Smith appeared in his first career playoff game and recorded three combined tackles, a sack, and earned the first safety during a 35–18 loss against the Green Bay Packers in the NFC Wildcard Game.

==== 2016 ====
In March 2016, Smith was voted as one of the best under-25 players in the NFL. Smith entered training camp slated as a backup outside linebacker behind Junior Galette and Ryan Kerrigan. Head coach Jay Gruden named Smith the starting right outside linebacker after Junior Galette sustained a torn Achilles during the 2016 preseason. In a game against the Minnesota Vikings in November 2016, Smith had two sacks, along with his first career interception, helping the Redskins to a 26–20 win.

==== 2017 ====
Smith had a strong performance in the 2017 win against the Arizona Cardinals recording a sack, his second career interception, and a fumble recovery caused by Anthony Lanier. In the last game of the season, Smith recorded his third career interception on New York Giants quarterback Eli Manning. In the 2017 season, he tied his season-high of eight sacks.

==== 2018 ====
In 2018, Smith recovered a fumble caused by Ryan Kerrigan in the end zone helping to seal the Week 7 win against the Dallas Cowboys and recording his first career touchdown. Smith recorded his fourth career interception against Houston Texans quarterback Deshaun Watson in Week 11.

=== Green Bay Packers ===
==== 2019 ====
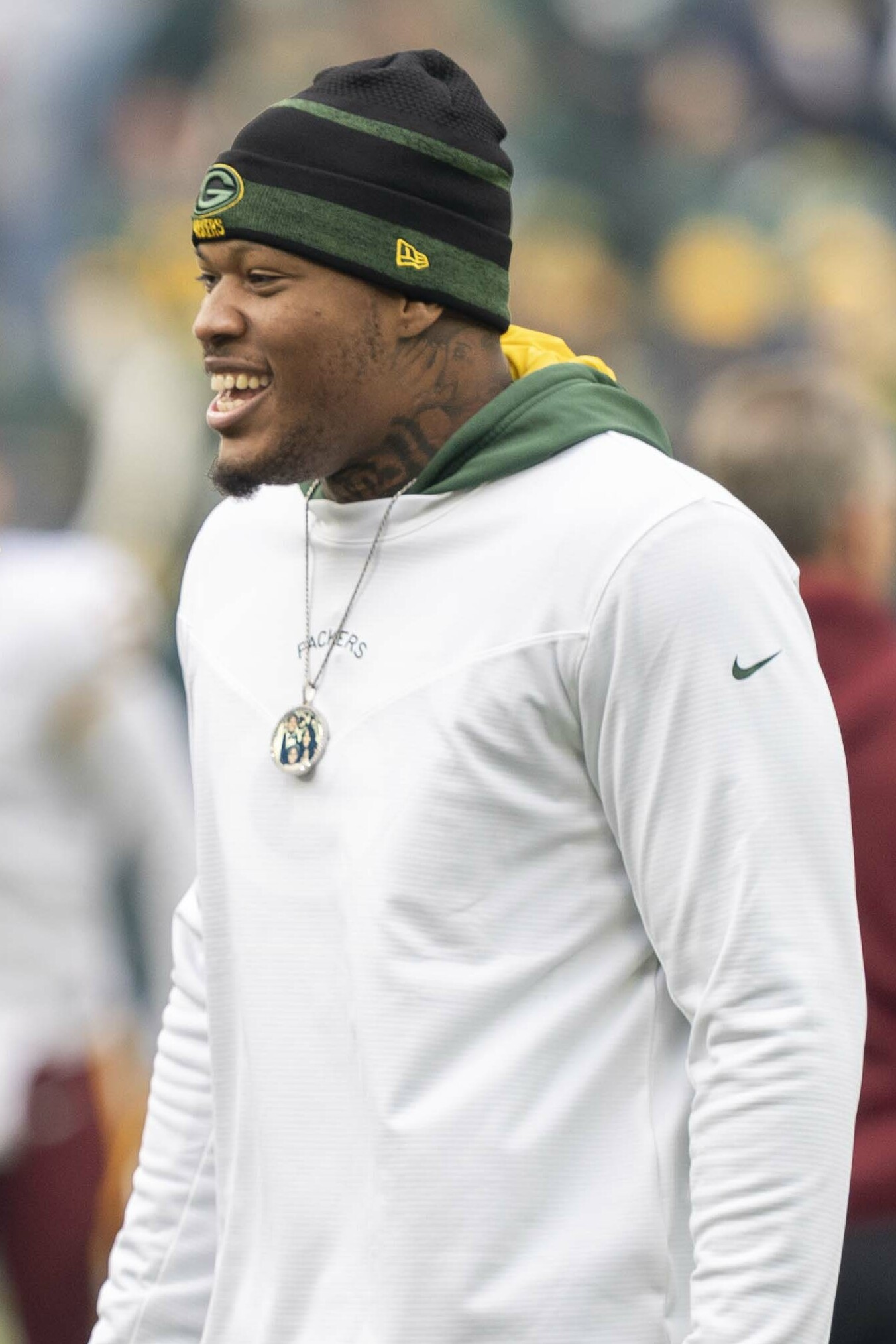
Smith with the Green Bay Packers in 2022

On March 14, 2019, Smith signed with the Packers on a four-year, $52 million contract. In Smith's debut as a Packer in Week 1 against the Bears, he made 5 tackles and sacked Mitchell Trubisky 1.5 times in the 10–3 win. In Week 3 against the Denver Broncos, Smith sacked Joe Flacco 3 times and forced a fumble that was recovered by the Packers in the 27–16 win, earning him NFC Defensive Player of the Week honors. In week 6 against the Detroit Lions, Smith sacked Matthew Stafford 1.5 times in the 23–22 win. In week 10 against the Carolina Panthers, Smith recorded 2 sacks on Kyle Allen in the 24–16 win.

In Week 16 against the Vikings, Smith recorded 3 tackles and 1.5 sacks during the 23–10 win. In the Divisional Round of the playoffs against the Seattle Seahawks, he recorded 2 sacks on Russell Wilson during the 28–23 win, including one at the 2-minute warning in the 4th quarter. He finished the season with 56 tackles, 12 sacks and four pass deflections.

==== 2020 ====
In Week 10 against the Jacksonville Jaguars, Smith recorded his first full sack of the season on Jake Luton during the 24–20 win. In Week 12 against the Bears on Sunday Night Football, Smith recorded three total tackles (one for loss) and sacked Bears quarterback Mitchell Trubisky once during the 41–25 win; he also recovered a fumble forced by teammate Za'Darius Smith on Trubisky and returned it for a 14-yard touchdown, the second score of his career.

==== 2021 ====
On March 12, 2021, Smith signed a new contract in Green Bay that reduced his base salary after a disappointing 2020 season, with performance incentives that could increase his total pay to eclipse the previous figure if he tallied 14 sacks during the season. Smith rebounded in 2021, tallying 9 sacks as a full-time starter with Za'Darius Smith injured for most of the year, and tallying high grades from Pro Football Focus.

==== 2022 ====
On March 14, 2022, Smith signed a four-year, $52.5 million extension with the Packers through the 2026 season.

==== 2024 ====
During the 2024 offseason, Smith switched positions from outside linebacker to defensive end after Green Bay's new defensive coordinator, Jeff Hafley, implemented a 4–3 defense. In 2024, he started nine games for the Packers and recorded 19 tackles and 2.5 sacks.

=== Pittsburgh Steelers ===
On November 5, 2024, the Packers traded Smith to the Pittsburgh Steelers in exchange for a seventh-round pick in the 2025 NFL draft. With the Steelers using a 3–4 defense, Smith switched back to the outside linebacker position. Smith told the media he was not comfortable with his new role as a defensive end in Hafley's defense and requested a trade, which the Packers granted.

Smith was released by the Steelers on February 14, 2025.

=== Washington Commanders ===
On September 17, 2025, Smith signed with the Washington Commanders.

== NFL career statistics ==
Legend
**Bold**	Career high

=== Regular season ===
Year	Team	Games		Tackles					Interceptions						Fumbles		
Year	Team	GP	GS	Total	Solo	Ast	Sck	SFTY	PDef	Int	Yds	Avg	Lng	TDs	FF	FR	TDs
2015	WAS	16	2	35	24	11	8.0	0	**4**	0	0	0	0	0	**3**	1	0
2016	WAS	16	16	38	22	16	4.5	0	3	1	22	**22.0**	**22**	0	0	0	0
2017	WAS	16	16	42	31	11	8.0	0	3	**2**	**26**	13.0	18	0	1	1	0
2018	WAS	16	16	53	30	**23**	4.0	0	3	1	3	3.0	3	0	0	1	**1**
2019	GB	16	16	56	36	20	**12.0**	0	**4**	1	5	5.0	5	0	1	0	0
2020	GB	16	13	42	29	13	4.0	0	3	0	0	0	0	0	0	1	**1**
2021	GB	16	16	38	25	13	9.0	0	2	0	0	0	0	0	2	**2**	0
2022	GB	17	17	**59**	**38**	21	8.5	0	1	0	0	0	0	0	1	0	0
2023	GB	17	17	48	28	20	8.0	0	4	0	0	0	0	0	2	0	0
2024	GB	9	9	19	6	13	2.5	0	0	0	0	0	0	0	0	0	0
2024	PIT	8	0	13	6	7	2.0	0	0	0	0	0	0	0	0	1	0
Total		163	138	443	275	168	70.5	0	27	5	56	11.2	22	0	10	7	2
Source: pro-football-reference.com

=== Postseason ===
Year	Team	Games		Tackles					Interceptions						Fumbles	
Year	Team	GP	GS	Total	Solo	Ast	Sck	SFTY	PDef	Int	Yds	Avg	Lng	TDs	FF	FR
2015	WAS	1	0	3	2	1	1.0	**1**	0	0	0	0	0	0	0	0
2019	GB	2	2	4	4	0	**2.0**	0	0	0	0	0	0	0	0	0
2020	GB	2	2	6	4	2	0.0	0	**2**	0	0	0	0	0	0	0
2021	GB	1	1	**9**	**6**	**3**	0.0	0	0	0	0	0	0	0	0	0
2023	GB	2	2	3	2	1	1.5	0	1	0	0	0	0	0	0	0
Total		8	7	25	18	7	4.5	0	3	0	0	0	0	0	0	0
Source: pro-football-reference.com
