= John Leglue =

American football player (born 1996)

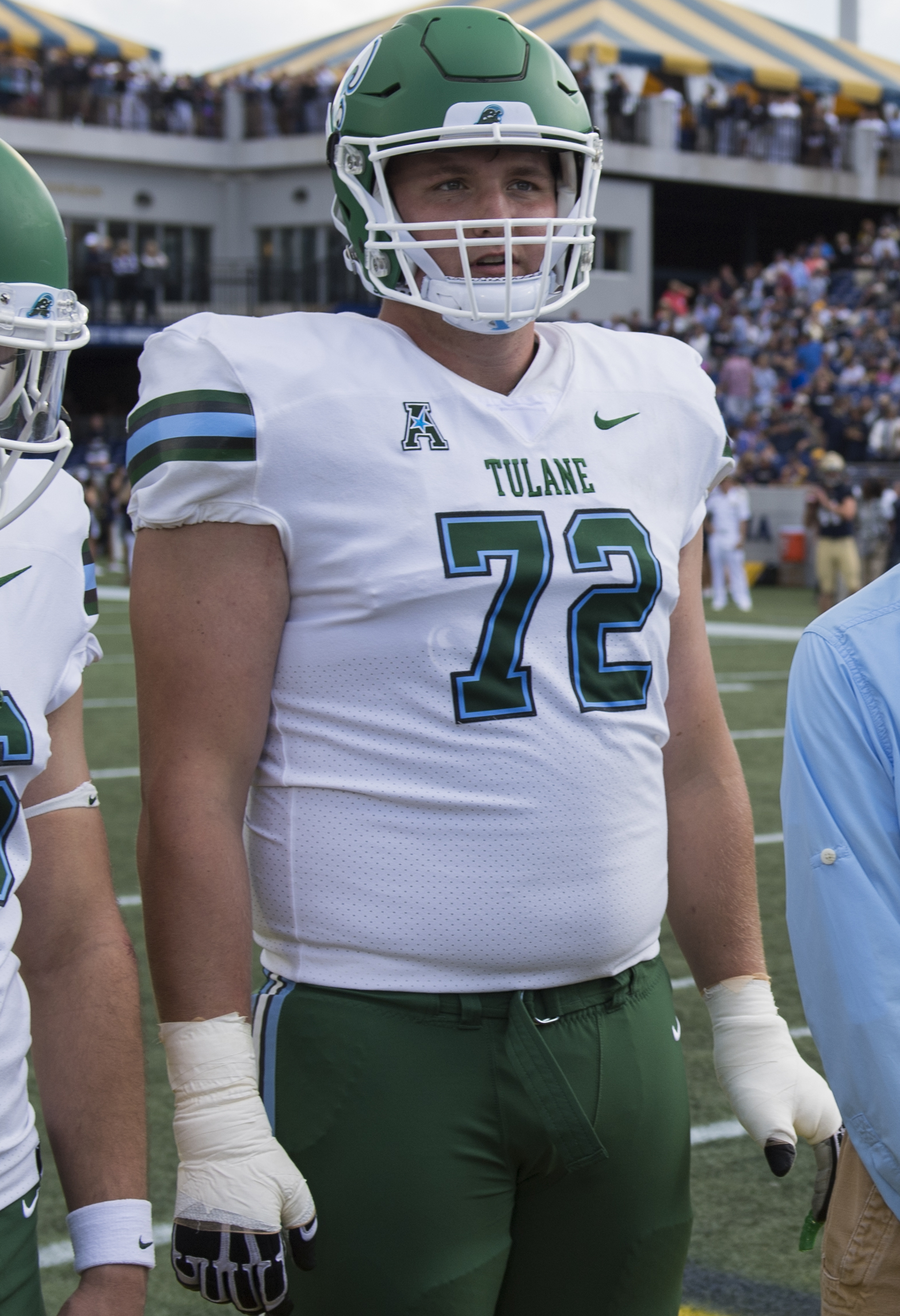
- Leglue with the Tulane Green Wave in 2017

Profile
- Position: Guard / Offensive tackle

Personal information
- Born: April 17, 1996 (age 30); Alexandria, Louisiana, U.S.
- Listed height: 6 ft 7 in (2.01 m)
- Listed weight: 310 lb (141 kg)

Career information
- High school: Holy Savior Menard Central (Alexandria, Louisiana)
- College: Tulane (2014–2018)
- NFL draft: 2019: undrafted

Career history
- Denver Broncos (2019)*; New Orleans Saints (2019)*; Green Bay Packers (2019–2020); Pittsburgh Steelers (2020–2022); Tennessee Titans (2023)*; Atlanta Falcons (2023); Pittsburgh Steelers (2024)*; Los Angeles Rams (2025)*
- * Offseason or practice squad member only

Career NFL statistics as of 2023
- Games played: 8
- Games started: 6
- Stats at Pro Football Reference

John Wagner Leglue (born April 17, 1996) is an American professional football guard and offensive tackle. He played college football for the Tulane Green Wave.

== College career ==
Leglue played four years at Tulane where he played in 49 games and made 38 starts, opening games at four different positions throughout the offensive line. As a senior, he started all 13 games at right guard, blocking for an offense that ranked No. 5 in the American Athletic Conference in rushing and later got his only career bowl game against Louisiana in the AutoNation Cure Bowl, where they obtained a 41–24 win.

== Professional career ==
Pre-draft measurables
Height	Weight	Arm length	Hand span	40-yard dash	10-yard split	20-yard split	20-yard shuttle	Three-cone drill	Vertical jump	Broad jump
6 ft 6 1/4 in (1.99 m)	301 lb (137 kg)	34 1/8 in (0.87 m)	10 in (0.25 m)	5.38 s	1.83 s	3.00 s	4.57 s	7.75 s	32.5 in (0.83 m)	8 ft 4 in (2.54 m)
All values from Pro Day

=== Denver Broncos ===
After his college stint, Leglue was signed by the Denver Broncos as an undrafted free agent on April 30, 2019. However, he was waived on August 31.

=== New Orleans Saints ===
On September 1, 2019, Leglue was signed by the New Orleans Saints to their practice squad, where he spent most of the season.

=== Green Bay Packers ===
On December 21, 2019, the Green Bay Packers signed Leglue from the Saints' practice squad spending the last two weeks of the season inactive. He later spent the next offseason with the Packers, eventually being waived on September 5, 2020.

=== Pittsburgh Steelers (first stint) ===
On December 29, 2020, the Pittsburgh Steelers signed Leglue to their practice squad, where he spent the rest of the season.

On January 14, 2021, the Steelers signed Leglue to a reserve/future contract. However, they waived him on August 31 and added him to the practice squad the next day. On November 27, the Steelers signed Leglue to the 53-man roster after a rash of injuries to the offensive line. He made his NFL debut in relief of B. J. Finney in a win against the Baltimore Ravens on December 5, earning praise from coach Mike Tomlin. Four days later, Leglue made his first start in a loss to the Minnesota Vikings. Following the Vikings game, he started at Left Guard for the remainder of the season which included a Wild Card playoff start versus the Kansas City Chiefs.

On August 30, 2022, Leglue was waived by the Steelers and signed to the practice squad the next day.

=== Tennessee Titans ===
On January 17, 2023, Leglue signed a reserve/future contract with the Tennessee Titans. He was waived on August 29.

=== Atlanta Falcons ===
On November 8, 2023, Leglue was signed to the Atlanta Falcons practice squad. He was elevated for the Indianapolis Colts game and saw action at Left Tackle. The next week he was elevated for the Chicago Bears game. Following the end of the regular season, he signed a reserve/future contract with Atlanta on January 10, 2024. On August 25, Leglue was waived by the Falcons.

=== Pittsburgh Steelers (second stint) ===
On August 29, 2024, Leglue was signed to the Pittsburgh Steelers practice squad. He was elevated to the active roster versus the Chargers but did not see any action. He was released on November 12, then re-signed on December 17.

=== Los Angeles Rams ===
On August 20, 2025, Leglue signed with the Los Angeles Rams, but was waived four days later.

== Personal life ==
Leglue earned an undergraduate degree in finance in three years and earned an MBA at Tulane University.
