= 2016 Green Bay Packers season =

NFL team season

- Owner: Green Bay Packers, Inc. (360,760 stockholders)
- General manager: Ted Thompson
- Head coach: Mike McCarthy
- Offensive coordinator: Edgar Bennett
- Defensive coordinator: Dom Capers
- Home stadium: Lambeau Field

Results
- Record: 10–6
- Division place: 1st NFC North
- Playoffs: Won Wild Card Playoffs (vs. Giants) 38–13; Won Divisional Playoffs (at Cowboys) 34–31; Lost NFC Championship (at Falcons) 21–44
- All-Pros: 2: LT David Bakhtiari (2nd team); S Ha Ha Clinton-Dix (2nd team)
- Pro Bowlers: 4: QB Aaron Rodgers; OT David Bakhtiari; G T. J. Lang; FS Ha Ha Clinton-Dix

Uniform
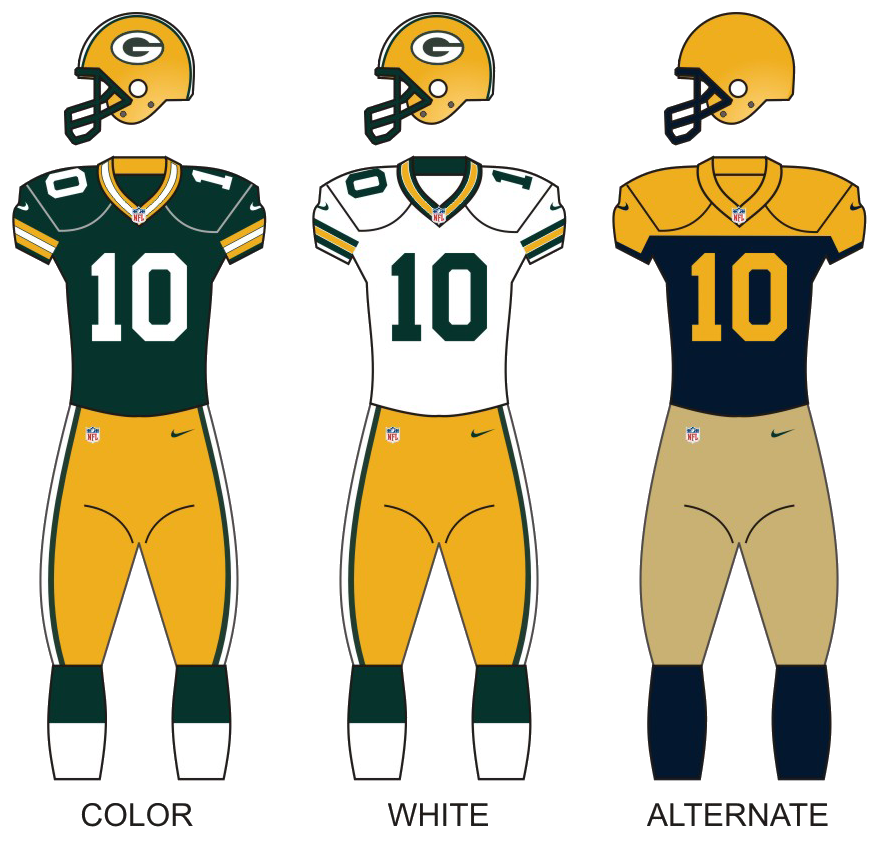

The 2016 season was the Green Bay Packers' 96th in the National Football League (NFL), their 98th overall and their 11th under head coach Mike McCarthy. Despite a 4–6 start to the season, the Packers went undefeated in their remaining six games to finish the regular season with a 10–6 record. The team clinched the NFC North for the fifth time in six years with their week 17 win over the Detroit Lions. They routed the 5th seeded New York Giants 38–13 in the wild card round of the playoffs and defeated the heavily favored Dallas Cowboys 34–31 in the divisional round of the playoffs, but their season came to an end when they lost to the second-seeded Atlanta Falcons in the NFC Championship Game 44–21.

== Offseason ==
=== Free agents ===
Position	Player	Free agency tag	Date signed	Team
S	Chris Banjo	ERFA	March 8, 2016	Green Bay Packers
OT	Don Barclay	UFA	April 18==2016, 2016	Green Bay Packers
K	Mason Crosby	UFA	March 1, 2016	Green Bay Packers
DE	Mike Daniels	UFA	December 14, 2015	Green Bay Packers
LS	Brett Goode	UFA	September 5, 2016	Green Bay Packers
DE	Letroy Guion	UFA	February 12, 2016	Green Bay Packers
CB	Casey Hayward	UFA	March 13, 2016	San Diego Chargers
WR	James Jones	UFA	August 2, 2016	San Diego Chargers
FB	John Kuhn	UFA	August 5, 2016	New Orleans Saints
OLB	Andy Mulumba	RFA	April 1, 2016	Kansas City Chiefs
OLB	Mike Neal	UFA		
TE	Justin Perillo	ERFA	March 9, 2016	Green Bay Packers
OLB	Nick Perry	UFA	March 11, 2016	Green Bay Packers
TE	Andrew Quarless	UFA	August 15, 2016	Detroit Lions
NT	B. J. Raji	UFA	N/A	N/A – Hiatus from football
SS	Sean Richardson	UFA		
RB	James Starks	UFA	March 22, 2016	Green Bay Packers
G	Lane Taylor	RFA	March 8, 2016	Green Bay Packers
QB	Scott Tolzien	UFA	March 11, 2016	Indianapolis Colts

Re-signed Signed Away Suspended, Released
RFA: Restricted free agent, UFA: Unrestricted free agent, ERFA: Exclusive rights free agent, FT: Franchise Tag

=== Draft ===
2016 Green Bay Packers draft
Round	Pick	Player	Position	College	Notes
1	27	Kenny Clark *	Nose tackle	UCLA	
2	48	Jason Spriggs	Offensive tackle	Indiana	Acquired from IND
3	88	Kyler Fackrell	Outside linebacker	Utah State	
4	131	Blake Martinez	Inside linebacker	Stanford	
4	137	Dean Lowry	Defensive end	Northwestern	
5	163	Trevor Davis	Wide receiver	California	
6	200	Kyle Murphy	Offensive tackle	Stanford	
Made roster † Pro Football Hall of Fame * Made at least one Pro Bowl during career

Notes

- As the result of a negative differential in free agent signings and departures that the Packers experienced during the 2015 free agency period, the team received two compensatory selections for the 2016 draft. Free agent transactions that occurred after May 12, 2015 did not impact the team's formula for determining compensatory selections for the 2016 draft.
- Thompson traded three picks to the Indianapolis Colts for their second round (48th overall) and selected Jason Spriggs. Thompson traded the Packers' second round pick (57th overall) a fourth-round pick (125th) and a seventh-round pick (248th).

=== Undrafted free agents ===
All undrafted free agents were signed after the 2016 NFL draft on April 30, unless noted otherwise.

Position	Player	College	Notes
WR	Geronimo Allison	Illinois	
S	Kentrell Brice	Louisiana Tech	
ILB	Beniquez Brown	Mississippi State	
QB	Joe Callahan	Wesley	2015 Gagliardi Trophy winner
CB	Makinton Dorleant	Northern Iowa	
C	Jacob Flores	Dartmouth	
OLB	Reggie Gilbert	Arizona	
TE	David Grinnage	NC State	
CB	Josh Hawkins	East Carolina	
RB	Don Jackson	Nevada	
OT	Josh James	Carroll	
CB	Randall Jette	UMass	
DE	Tyler Kuder	Idaho State	
P	Peter Mortell	Minnesota	
WR	Dennis Parks	Rice	
LB	Manoa Pikula	BYU	
NT	Brian Price	UTSA	
WR	Devonte Robinson	Utah State	
WR	Herb Waters	Miami (FL)	
G	Kyle Steuck	Northern Michigan	

== Staff ==
2016 Green Bay Packers staff
Front office: Executive committee – Board of Directors; President/CEO – Mark Murphy; Executive vice president/general manager – Ted Thompson; Vice president of football administration/player finance – Russ Ball; Director of football operations – Eliot Wolf; Director of player personnel – Brian Gutekunst; Director of college scouting – Jon-Eric Sullivan; Assistant director of pro personnel – Tim Terry; Senior personnel executive – Alonzo Highsmith; Head coaches: Head coach – Mike McCarthy; Associate head coach/offense – Tom Clements; Associate head coach/linebackers – Winston Moss; Offensive coaches: Offensive coordinator – Edgar Bennett; Quarterbacks – Alex Van Pelt; Running backs – Ben Sirmans; Wide receivers – Luke Getsy; Tight ends – Brian Angelichio; Offensive line – James Campen; Assistant offensive line – David Raih	Defensive coaches: Defensive coordinator – Dom Capers; Defensive line – Mike Trgovac; Assistant linebackers – Scott McCurley; Secondary (Cornerbacks) – Joe Whitt Jr.; Secondary (Safeties) – Darren Perry; Defensive front assistant – Jerry Montgomery; Defensive quality control – Ejiro Evero; Special teams coaches: Special teams coordinator – Ron Zook; Assistant special teams – Jason Simmons; Strength and conditioning: Strength and conditioning coordinator – Mark Lovat; Strength and conditioning assistant – Chris Gizzi; Strength and conditioning assistant – Thadeus Jackson; Strength and conditioning assistant – Grant Thorne

== Final roster ==
2016 Green Bay Packers roster
Quarterbacks (QB): 6 Joe Callahan; 7 Brett Hundley; 12 Aaron Rodgers; Running backs (RB): 40 Joe Kerridge FB; 32 Christine Michael; 88 Ty Montgomery; 22 Aaron Ripkowski FB; 44 James Starks; Wide receivers (WR): 17 Davante Adams; 81 Geronimo Allison; 18 Randall Cobb; 11 Trevor Davis; 83 Jeff Janis; 87 Jordy Nelson; Tight ends (TE): 89 Jared Cook; 80 Justin Perillo; 82 Richard Rodgers	Offensive linemen (OL): 69 David Bakhtiari LT; 67 Don Barclay G; 75 Bryan Bulaga RT; 70 T. J. Lang G; 63 Corey Linsley C; 68 Kyle Murphy RT; 78 Jason Spriggs LT; 65 Lane Taylor G; 73 JC Tretter C; Defensive linemen (DL): 97 Kenny Clark DE; 76 Mike Daniels DE; 98 Letroy Guion NT; 95 Datone Jones DE; 94 Dean Lowry DE; 99 Christian Ringo DE	Linebackers (LB): 91 Jayrone Elliott OLB; 51 Kyler Fackrell OLB; 50 Blake Martinez ILB; 52 Clay Matthews OLB; 56 Julius Peppers OLB; 53 Nick Perry OLB; 47 Jake Ryan ILB; 48 Joe Thomas ILB; 58 Jordan Tripp ILB; Defensive backs (DB): 29 Kentrell Brice S; 42 Morgan Burnett SS; 21 Ha Ha Clinton-Dix FS; 20 Makinton Dorleant CB; 25 Marwin Evans SS; 36 LaDarius Gunter CB; 28 Josh Hawkins CB; 33 Micah Hyde SS; 23 Damarious Randall CB; 24 Quinten Rollins CB; Special teams (ST): 2 Mason Crosby K; 61 Brett Goode LS; 10 Jake Schum P	Practice squad: 54 Carl Bradford ILB; 86 Devon Cajuste TE (IR); 57 Jacob Flores C; 93 Reggie Gilbert OLB; 19 Antwan Goodley WR; 49 Derrick Mathews ILB; 13 Max McCaffrey WR; 62 Lucas Patrick G; 96 Brian Price NT; 85 Beau Sandland TE; 26 Herb Waters CB; 35 Jermaine Whitehead FS; Reserve: 84 Jared Abbrederis WR (IR); 32 Chris Banjo S (IR); 38 John Crockett RB (IR); 39 Demetri Goodson CB (IR); 34 Don Jackson RB (IR); 27 Eddie Lacy RB (IR); 64 Mike Pennel DE (Susp.); 37 Sam Shields CB (IR); Rookies in italics 53 active, 7 reserve, 11 practice squad

== Starters ==
=== Regular season ===
==== Offense ====
Pos.	Name	GS
QB	Aaron Rodgers	16
RB	Eddie Lacy; Ty Montgomery; Don Jackson; James Starks	5; 6; 1; 4
WR	Randall Cobb; Geronimo Allison	10; 2
WR	Jordy Nelson	16
WR	Davante Adams; Jeff Janis	15; 1
FB	Aaron Ripkowski	8
TE	Jared Cook; Richard Rodgers; Justin Perillo	5; 6; 1
LT	David Bakhtiari	16
LG	Lane Taylor	16
C	J. C. Tretter; Corey Linsley	7; 9
RG	T. J. Lang; Don Barclay; Jason Spriggs	13; 1; 2
RT	Bryan Bulaga	16

==== Defense ====
Pos.	Name	GS
DT	Mike Daniels	16
NT	Letroy Guion; Kenny Clark	15; 1
DE	Kenny Clark; Datone Jones	1; 1
OLB	Nick Perry; Datone Jones	12; 3
OLB	Clay Matthews III; Julius Peppers	6; 11
ILB	Jake Ryan; Joe Thomas	10; 7
ILB	Blake Martinez; Clay Matthews III; Morgan Burnett	9; 3; 1
CB	LaDarius Gunter; Sam Shields	15; 1
CB	Damarious Randall; Micah Hyde	9; 8
CB	Quinten Rollins; Demetri Goodson	10; 3
SS	Morgan Burnett; Micah Hyde; Kentrell Brice	14; 1; 1
FS	Ha Ha Clinton-Dix	16
S	Micah Hyde	2

=== Playoffs ===
==== Offense ====
Pos.	Name	GS
QB	Aaron Rodgers	3
RB	Ty Montgomery	3
WR	Randall Cobb	3
WR	Jordy Nelson; Geronimo Allison	2; 1
WR	Davante Adams	3
TE	Jared Cook	3
LT	David Bakhtiari	3
LG	Lane Taylor	3
C	Corey Linsley	3
RG	T. J. Lang	3
RT	Bryan Bulaga	3

==== Defense ====
Pos.	Name	GS
DT	Mike Daniels	3
NT	Letroy Guion	3
OLB	Clay Matthews III	3
OLB	Julius Peppers	3
ILB	Jake Ryan	3
ILB	Blake Martinez; Joe Thomas	1; 2
CB	LaDarius Gunter	3
CB	Damarious Randall	3
CB	Micah Hyde	3
SS	Morgan Burnett	3
FS	Ha Ha Clinton-Dix	3

== Standings ==
=== Division ===
NFC North
	W	L	T	PCT	DIV	CONF	PF	PA	STK
^{(4)} Green Bay Packers	10	6	0	.625	5–1	8–4	432	388	W6
^{(6)} Detroit Lions	9	7	0	.563	3–3	7–5	346	358	L3
Minnesota Vikings	8	8	0	.500	2–4	5–7	327	307	W1
Chicago Bears	3	13	0	.188	2–4	3–9	279	399	L4

=== Conference ===
NFC
#	Team	Division	W	L	T	PCT	DIV	CONF	SOS	SOV	STK
Division leaders
1	Dallas Cowboys	East	13	3	0	.813	3–3	9–3	.471	.440	L1
2	Atlanta Falcons	South	11	5	0	.688	5–1	9–3	.480	.452	W4
3	Seattle Seahawks	West	10	5	1	.656	3–2–1	6–5–1	.441	.425	W1
4	Green Bay Packers	North	10	6	0	.625	5–1	8–4	.508	.453	W6
Wild Cards
5	New York Giants	East	11	5	0	.688	4–2	8–4	.486	.455	W1
6 (Note: Detroit finished ahead of Tampa Bay for the No. 6 seed and qualified for the last playoff spot based on record vs. common opponents—Detroit's cumulative record against Chicago, Dallas, Los Angeles and New Orleans was 3–2, while Tampa Bay's cumulative record against the same four teams was 2–3.)	Detroit Lions	North	9	7	0	.563	3–3	7–5	.475	.392	L3
Did not qualify for the postseason
7	Tampa Bay Buccaneers	South	9	7	0	.563	4–2	7–5	.492	.434	W1
8	Washington Redskins	East	8	7	1	.531	3–3	6–6	.516	.430	L1
9	Minnesota Vikings	North	8	8	0	.500	2–4	5–7	.492	.457	W1
10	Arizona Cardinals	West	7	8	1	.469	4–1–1	6–5–1	.463	.366	W2
11 (Note: New Orleans finished ahead of Philadelphia based on better record vs. conference opponents.)	New Orleans Saints	South	7	9	0	.438	2–4	6–6	.523	.393	L1
12	Philadelphia Eagles	East	7	9	0	.438	2–4	5–7	.559	.518	W2
13	Carolina Panthers	South	6	10	0	.375	1–5	5–7	.518	.354	L2
14	Los Angeles Rams	West	4	12	0	.250	2–4	3–9	.504	.500	L7
15	Chicago Bears	North	3	13	0	.188	2–4	3–9	.521	.396	L4
16	San Francisco 49ers	West	2	14	0	.125	2–4	2–10	.504	.250	L1
Tiebreakers (Note: When breaking ties for three or more teams under the NFL's rules, they are first broken within divisions, then comparing only the highest-ranked remaining team from each division.)

== Schedule ==
=== Preseason ===
On February 16, the NFL announced that the Packers would play the Indianapolis Colts in the Pro Football Hall of Fame Game. The game would have occurred on Sunday, August 7, at Tom Benson Hall of Fame Stadium in Canton, Ohio, but was cancelled due to field conditions. However, the two teams met during the regular season in Green Bay.

The remainder of the Packers' preseason opponents and schedule were announced on April 7.

Week	Date	Opponent	Result	Record	Venue	Recap
HOF	August 7	vs. Indianapolis Colts	**Cancelled due to field conditions**			
1	August 12	Cleveland Browns	**W** 17–11	1–0	Lambeau Field	Recap
2	August 18	Oakland Raiders	**W** 20–12	2–0	Lambeau Field	Recap
3	August 26	at San Francisco 49ers	**W** 21–10	3–0	Levi's Stadium	Recap
4	September 1	at Kansas City Chiefs	**L** 7–17	3–1	Arrowhead Stadium	Recap

=== Regular season ===
Week	Date	Opponent	Result	Record	Venue	Recap
1	September 11	at Jacksonville Jaguars	**W** 27–23	1–0	EverBank Field	Recap
2	September 18	at **Minnesota Vikings**	**L** 14–17	1–1	U.S. Bank Stadium	Recap
3	September 25	**Detroit Lions**	**W** 34–27	2–1	Lambeau Field	Recap
4	Bye					
5	October 9	New York Giants	**W** 23–16	3–1	Lambeau Field	Recap
6	October 16	Dallas Cowboys	**L** 16–30	3–2	Lambeau Field	Recap
7	October 20	**Chicago Bears**	**W** 26–10	4–2	Lambeau Field	Recap
8	October 30	at Atlanta Falcons	**L** 32–33	4–3	Georgia Dome	Recap
9	November 6	Indianapolis Colts	**L** 26–31	4–4	Lambeau Field	Recap
10	November 13	at Tennessee Titans	**L** 25–47	4–5	Nissan Stadium	Recap
11	November 20	at Washington Redskins	**L** 24–42	4–6	FedExField	Recap
12	November 28	at Philadelphia Eagles	**W** 27–13	5–6	Lincoln Financial Field	Recap
13	December 4	Houston Texans	**W** 21–13	6–6	Lambeau Field	Recap
14	December 11	Seattle Seahawks	**W** 38–10	7–6	Lambeau Field	Recap
15	December 18	at **Chicago Bears**	**W** 30–27	8–6	Soldier Field	Recap
16	December 24	**Minnesota Vikings**	**W** 38–25	9–6	Lambeau Field	Recap
17	January 1, 2017	at **Detroit Lions**	**W** 31–24	10–6	Ford Field	Recap

Note: Intra-division opponents are in bold text.

=== Postseason ===
Round	Date	Opponent	Result	Record	Venue	Recap
Wild Card	January 8, 2017	New York Giants (5)	**W** 38–13	1–0	Lambeau Field	Recap
Divisional	January 15, 2017	at Dallas Cowboys (1)	**W** 34–31	2–0	AT&T Stadium	Recap
NFC Championship	January 22, 2017	at Atlanta Falcons (2)	**L** 21–44	2–1	Georgia Dome	Recap

== Game summaries ==
=== Regular season ===
==== Week 1: at Jacksonville Jaguars ====
Week One: Green Bay Packers at Jacksonville Jaguars – Game summary

Quarter	1	2	3	4	Total
Packers	7	14	3	3	27
Jaguars	7	10	3	3	23

at EverBank Field, Jacksonville, Florida

- Date: September 11
- Game time: 1:00 p.m. EDT/12:00 p.m. CDT
- Game weather: 90 °F (32 °C), sunny
- Game attendance: 63,179
- Referee: Carl Cheffers (51)
- TV announcers (Fox): Kevin Burkhardt, John Lynch and Pam Oliver
- Recap, Gamebook

Game information

First quarter

- GB – Aaron Rodgers 6-yard run (Mason Crosby kick), 9:45. Packers 7–0. Drive: 6 plays, 29 yards, 3:05.
- JAX – T. J. Yeldon 5-yard run (Jason Myers kick), 3:43. Tied 7–7. Drive: 3 plays, 48 yards, 1:24.

Second quarter

- JAX – Jason Myers 26-yard field goal, 7:52. Jaguars 10–7. Drive: 12 plays, 45 yards, 5:52.
- GB – Jordy Nelson 6-yard pass from Aaron Rodgers (Mason Crosby kick), 3:14. Packers 14–10. Drive: 9 plays, 75 yards, 4:43.
- JAX – Julius Thomas 22-yard pass from Blake Bortles (Jason Myers kick), 1:09. Jaguars 17–14. Drive: 7 plays, 75 yards, 1:56.
- GB – Davante Adams 29-yard pass from Aaron Rodgers (Mason Crosby kick), 0:20. Packers 21–17. Drive: 5 plays, 75 yards, 0:56.

Third quarter

- GB – Mason Crosby 25-yard field goal, 10:12. Packers 24–17. Drive: 13 plays, 68 yards, 4:48.
- JAX – Jason Myers 39-yard field goal, 6:15. Packers 24–20. Drive: 10 plays, 54 yards, 3:57.

Fourth quarter

- GB – Mason Crosby 20-yard field goal, 12:01. Packers 27–20. Drive: 13 plays, 68 yards, 4:48.
- JAX – Jason Myers 50-yard field goal, 5:12. Packers 27–23. Drive: 14 plays, 37 yards, 6:49.

Top passers

- GB – Aaron Rodgers – 20/34, 199 yards, 2 TD
- JAX – Blake Bortles – 24/39, 320 yards, TD, INT

Top rushers

- GB – Eddie Lacy – 14 rushes, 61 yards
- JAX – T. J. Yeldon – 21 rushes, 39 yards, TD

Top receivers

- GB – Randall Cobb – 6 receptions, 57 yards
- JAX – Allen Hurns – 4 receptions, 75 yards

==== Week 2: at Minnesota Vikings ====
Week Two: Green Bay Packers at Minnesota Vikings – Game summary

Quarter	1	2	3	4	Total
Packers	7	0	0	7	14
Vikings	0	10	7	0	17

at U.S. Bank Stadium, Minneapolis, Minnesota

- Date: September 18
- Game time: 7:30 p.m. CDT
- Game weather: Played indoors (dome stadium)
- Game attendance: 66,813
- Referee: Walt Anderson (66)
- TV announcers (NBC): Al Michaels, Cris Collinsworth and Michele Tafoya
- Recap, Gamebook

Game information

First quarter

- GB – Jordy Nelson 1-yard pass from Aaron Rodgers (Mason Crosby kick), 5:44. Packers 7–0. Drive: 5 plays, 51 yards, 3:08.

Second quarter

- MIN – Kyle Rudolph 8-yard pass from Sam Bradford (Blair Walsh kick), 10:18. Tied 7–7. Drive: 10 plays, 54 yards, 4:46.
- MIN – Blair Walsh 46-yard field goal, 00:31. Vikings 10–7. Drive: 8 plays, 59 yards, 4:14.

Third quarter

- MIN – Stefon Diggs 25-yard pass from Sam Bradford (Blair Walsh kick), 2:16. Vikings 17–7. Drive: 6 plays, 87 yards, 2:46.

Fourth quarter

- GB – Aaron Rodgers 10-yard run (Mason Crosby kick), 12:50. Vikings 17–14. Drive: 10 plays, 75 yards, 4:30.

Top passers

- GB – Aaron Rodgers – 20/36, 213 yards, TD, INT
- MIN – Sam Bradford – 22/31, 286 yards, 2 TD

Top rushers

- GB – Eddie Lacy – 12 rushes, 50 yards
- MIN – Adrian Peterson – 12 rushes, 19 yards

Top receivers

- GB – Jordy Nelson – 5 receptions, 73 yards, TD
- MIN – Stefon Diggs – 9 receptions, 182 yards, TD

==== Week 3: vs. Detroit Lions ====
Week Three: Detroit Lions at Green Bay Packers – Game summary

Quarter	1	2	3	4	Total
Lions	3	7	7	10	27
Packers	14	17	3	0	34

at Lambeau Field, Green Bay, Wisconsin

- Date: September 25
- Game time: 12:00 p.m. CDT
- Game weather: 72 °F (22 °C), clear
- Game attendance: 78,411
- Referee: Carl Cheffers (51)
- TV announcers (Fox): Thom Brennaman, Charles Davis and Peter Schrager
- Recap, Gamebook

Game information

First quarter

- GB – Davante Adams 14-yard pass from Aaron Rodgers (Mason Crosby kick), 11:27. Packers 7–0. Drive: 8 plays, 75 yards, 3:38.
- DET – Matt Prater 42-yard field goal, 2:49. Packers 7–3. Drive: 15 plays, 52 yards, 8:37.
- GB – Jordy Nelson 8-yard pass from Aaron Rodgers (Mason Crosby kick), 1:07. Packers 14–3. Drive: 4 plays, 60 yards, 1:44.

Second quarter

- GB – Richard Rodgers 2-yard pass from Aaron Rodgers (Mason Crosby kick), 14:51. Packers 21–3. Drive: 2 plays, 67 yards, 0:47.
- GB – Mason Crosby 36-yard field goal, 10:45. Packers 24–3. Drive: 4 plays, 7 yards, 0:59.
- GB – Jordy Nelson 17-yard pass from Aaron Rodgers (Mason Crosby kick), 1:14. Packers 31–3. Drive: 7 plays, 67 yards, 3:53.
- DET – Marvin Jones 73-yard pass from Matthew Stafford (Matt Prater kick), 0:42. Packers 31–10. Drive: 2 plays, 75 yards, 0:38.

Third quarter

- DET – Anquan Boldin 2-yard pass from Matthew Stafford (Matt Prater kick), 8:26. Packers 31–17. Drive: 12 plays, 77 yards, 6:37.
- GB – Mason Crosby 46-yard field goal, 3:18. Packers 34–17. Drive: 9 plays, 47 yards, 5:09.

Fourth quarter

- DET – Matt Prater 50-yard field goal, 12:35. Packers 34–20. Drive: 10 plays, 50 yards, 5:42.
- DET – Marvin Jones 35-yard pass from Matthew Stafford (Matt Prater kick), 3:40. Packers 34–27. Drive: 6 plays, 62 yards, 1:31.

Top passers

- DET – Matthew Stafford – 28/41, 385 yards, 3 TD, INT
- GB – Aaron Rodgers – 15/24, 205 yards, 4 TD

Top rushers

- DET – Dwayne Washington – 10 rushes, 38 yards
- GB – Eddie Lacy – 17 rushes, 103 yards

Top receivers

- DET – Marvin Jones – 6 receptions, 205 yards, 2 TD
- GB – Jordy Nelson – 6 receptions, 101 yards, 2 TD

==== Week 4: Bye week ====
No game. Green Bay had their bye week on Week 4.

==== Week 5: vs. New York Giants ====
Week Five: New York Giants at Green Bay Packers – Game summary

Quarter	1	2	3	4	Total
Giants	0	6	3	7	16
Packers	7	10	0	6	23

at Lambeau Field, Green Bay, Wisconsin

- Date: October 9
- Game time: 7:30 p.m. CDT
- Game weather: 49 °F (9 °C), cloudy
- Game attendance: 78,401
- Referee: Ed Hochuli (85)
- TV announcers (NBC): Al Michaels, Cris Collinsworth and Michele Tafoya
- Recap, Gamebook

Game information

First quarter

- GB – Jordy Nelson 2-yard pass from Aaron Rodgers (Mason Crosby kick), 6:23. Packers 7–0. Drive: 16 plays, 75 yards, 8:42.

Second quarter

- NYG – Josh Brown 47-yard field goal, 8:26. Packers 7–3. Drive: 5 plays, 26 yards, 1:24.
- GB – Davante Adams 29-yard pass from Aaron Rodgers (Mason Crosby kick), 6:07. Packers 14–3. Drive: 5 plays, 80 yards, 2:20.
- NYG – Josh Brown 41-yard field goal, 1:55. Packers 14–6. Drive: 5 plays, 17 yards, 1:13.
- GB – Mason Crosby 44-yard field goal, 0:03. Packers 17–6. Drive: 4 plays, 5 yards, 1:15.

Third quarter

- NYG – Josh Brown 30-yard field goal, 5:31. Packers 17–9. Drive: 9 plays, 41 yards, 4:43.

Fourth quarter

- GB – Mason Crosby 33-yard field goal, 13:50. Packers 20–9. Drive: 9 plays, 65 yards, 4:46.
- GB – Mason Crosby 25-yard field goal, 6:42. Packers 23–9. Drive: 13 plays, 73 yards, 6:22.
- NYG – Odell Beckham Jr. 8-yard pass from Eli Manning (Josh Brown kick), 3:03. Packers 23–16. Drive: 10 plays, 63 yards, 3:45.

Top passers

- NYG – Eli Manning – 18/35, 199 yards, 1 TD
- GB – Aaron Rodgers – 23/45, 259 yards, 2 TD, 2 INT

Top rushers

- NYG – Bobby Rainey – 5 rushes, 22 yards
- GB – Eddie Lacy – 11 rushes, 81 yards

Top receivers

- NYG – Odell Beckham Jr. – 5 receptions, 56 yards, 1 TD
- GB – Randall Cobb – 9 receptions, 108 yards

==== Week 6: vs. Dallas Cowboys ====
Week Six: Dallas Cowboys at Green Bay Packers – Game summary

Quarter	1	2	3	4	Total
Cowboys	7	10	3	10	30
Packers	3	3	0	10	16

at Lambeau Field, Green Bay, Wisconsin

- Date: October 16
- Game time: 3:25 p.m. CDT
- Game weather: 69 °F (21 °C), clear
- Game attendance: 78,481
- Referee: Brad Allen (122)
- TV announcers (Fox): Thom Brennaman, Troy Aikman and Erin Andrews
- Recap, Gamebook

Game information

First quarter

- DAL – Cole Beasley 1-yard pass from Dak Prescott (Dan Bailey kick), 10:08. Cowboys 7–0. Drive: 8 plays, 75 yards, 4:57.
- GB – Mason Crosby 37-yard field goal, 5:14. Cowboys 7–3. Drive: 9 plays, 56 yards, 4:52.

Second quarter

- GB – Mason Crosby 43-yard field goal, 12:19. Cowboys 7–6. Drive: 9 plays, 45 yards, 4:08.
- DAL – Dan Bailey 44-yard field goal, 6:05. Cowboys 10–6. Drive: 12 plays, 50 yards, 6:15.
- DAL – Brice Butler 20-yard pass from Dak Prescott (Dan Bailey kick), 0:31. Cowboys 17–6. Drive: 5 plays, 97 yards, 0:33.

Third quarter

- DAL – Dan Bailey 22-yard field goal, 7:02. Cowboys 20–6. Drive: 7 plays, 47 yards, 3:05.

Fourth quarter

- GB – Mason Crosby 34-yard field goal, 14:51. Cowboys 20–9. Drive: 4 plays, 0 yards, 0:32.
- DAL – Cole Beasley 4-yard pass from Dak Prescott (Dan Bailey kick), 10:31. Cowboys 27–9. Drive: 7 plays, 75 yards, 4:22.
- GB – Randall Cobb 4-yard pass from Aaron Rodgers (Mason Crosby kick), 6:57. Cowboys 27–16. Drive: 9 plays, 75 yards, 3:33.
- DAL – Dan Bailey 32-yard field goal, 3:45. Cowboys 30–16. Drive: 8 plays, 48 yards, 3:12.

Top passers

- DAL – Dak Prescott – 18/27, 247 yards, 3 TD, INT
- GB – Aaron Rodgers – 31/42, 294 yards, TD, INT

Top rushers

- DAL – Ezekiel Elliott – 28 rushes, 157 yards
- GB – Eddie Lacy – 17 rushes, 65 yards

Top receivers

- DAL – Terrance Williams – 4 receptions, 75 yards
- GB – Ty Montgomery – 10 receptions, 98 yards

The Packers wore their throwback uniforms for this game.

The Dallas defense forced four Green Bay turnovers. It was the first time since 2008, and second time in Cowboys history, that Dallas had won at Lambeau.

This was the Packers first loss wearing throwback uniforms.

==== Week 7: vs. Chicago Bears ====
Week Seven: Chicago Bears at Green Bay Packers – Game summary

Quarter	1	2	3	4	Total
Bears	0	3	7	0	10
Packers	3	3	7	13	26

at Lambeau Field, Green Bay, Wisconsin

- Date: October 20
- Game time: 7:25 p.m. CDT
- Game weather: 47 °F (8 °C), cloudy
- Game attendance: 78,217
- Referee: John Parry (132)
- TV announcers (CBS/NFLN/Twitter): Jim Nantz, Phil Simms and Tracy Wolfson
- Recap, Gamebook

Game information

First quarter

- GB – Mason Crosby 32-yard field goal, 8:53. Packers 3–0. Drive: 13 plays, 53 yards, 5:19.

Second quarter

- CHI – Connor Barth 39-yard field goal, 1:56. Tied 3–3. Drive: 9 plays, 54 yards, 4:38.
- GB – Mason Crosby 40-yard field goal, 0:17. Packers 6–3. Drive: 10 plays, 53 yards, 1:39.

Third quarter

- CHI – Leonard Floyd fumble recovery in end zone, 14:30. Bears 10–6.
- GB – Davante Adams 5-yard pass from Aaron Rodgers (Mason Crosby kick), 9:11. Packers 13–10. Drive: 13 plays, 85 yards, 5:19.

Fourth quarter

- GB – Davante Adams 4-yard pass from Aaron Rodgers (Mason Crosby kick), 14:55. Packers 20–10. Drive: 8 plays, 88 yards, 4:40.
- GB – Randall Cobb 2-yard pass from Aaron Rodgers, 5:35. Packers 26–10. Drive: 13 plays, 74 yards, 8:33.

Top passers

- CHI – Matt Barkley – 6/15, 81 yards, 2 INT
- GB – Aaron Rodgers – 39/56, 326 yards, 3 TD

Top rushers

- CHI – Ka'Deem Carey – 10 rushes, 48 yards
- GB – Ty Montgomery – 9 rushes, 60 yards

Top receivers

- CHI – Alshon Jeffery – 3 receptions, 33 yards
- GB – Davante Adams – 13 receptions, 132 yards

For the first time since 1989, the Packers wore their white jerseys at a home game. As part of the NFL Color Rush, they wore white jerseys and white pants for the first time.

==== Week 8: at Atlanta Falcons ====
Week Eight: Green Bay Packers at Atlanta Falcons – Game summary

Quarter	1	2	3	4	Total
Packers	7	17	0	8	32
Falcons	10	9	7	7	33

at Georgia Dome, Atlanta

- Date: October 30
- Game time: 4:25 p.m. EDT/3:25 p.m. CDT
- Game weather: Played indoors (dome stadium)
- Game attendance: 70,165
- Referee: Walt Anderson (66)
- TV announcers (Fox): Thom Brennaman, Troy Aikman and Erin Andrews
- Recap, Gamebook

Game information

First quarter

- ATL – Matt Bryant 36-yard field goal, 9:46. Falcons 3–0. Drive: 10 plays, 57 yards, 5:19.
- GB – Jordy Nelson 5-yard pass from Aaron Rodgers (Mason Crosby kick), 6:14. Packers 7–3. Drive: 6 plays, 75 yards, 3:33.
- ATL – Taylor Gabriel 47-yard pass from Matt Ryan (Matt Bryant kick), 5:19. Falcons 10–7. Drive: 3 plays, 71 yards, 1:40.

Second quarter

- GB – Geronimo Allison 14-yard pass from Aaron Rodgers (Mason Crosby kick), 11:58. Packers 14–10. Drive: 14 plays, 75 yards, 7:35.
- ATL – Matt Bryant 40-yard field goal, 8:55. Packers 14–13. Drive: 6 plays, 48 yards, 3:01.
- GB – Trevor Davis 9-yard pass from Aaron Rodgers (Mason Crosby kick), 4:31. Packers 21–13. Drive: 4 plays, 15 yards, 1:24.
- ATL – Devonta Freeman 5-yard pass from Matt Ryan, 0:32. Packers 21–19. Drive: 8 plays, 75 yards, 3:55.
- GB – Mason Crosby 29-yard field goal, 0:04. Packers 24–19. Drive: 4 plays, 64 yards, 0:27.

Third quarter

- ATL – Devonta Freeman 1-yard run (Matt Bryant kick), 3:35. Falcons 26–24. Drive: 14 plays, 80 yards, 7:31.

Fourth quarter

- GB – Jeff Janis 7-yard pass from Aaron Rodgers (Aaron Rodgers run), 4:04. Packers 32–26. Drive: 13 plays, 86 yards, 8:33.
- ATL – Mohamed Sanu 11-yard pass from Matt Ryan (Matt Bryant kick), 0:36. Falcons 33–32. Drive: 11 plays, 75 yards, 3:27.

Top passers

- GB – Aaron Rodgers – 28/38, 246 yards, 4 TD
- ATL – Matt Ryan – 28/35, 288 yards, 3 TD

Top rushers

- GB – Aaron Rodgers – 6 rushes, 60 yards
- ATL – Terron Ward – 6 rushes, 46 yards

- GB – Jordy Nelson – 4 receptions, 94 yards, TD
- ATL – Mohamed Sanu – 9 receptions, 84 yards, TD

Despite Aaron Rodgers throwing for 4 touchdowns and the team holding a 32–26 lead with less than a minute left in the game, Matt Ryan threw a game-sealing touchdown pass to wide receiver Mohamed Sanu to stun Green Bay. The Packers drop to 4-3 after the last-second loss.

==== Week 9: vs. Indianapolis Colts ====
Week Nine: Indianapolis Colts at Green Bay Packers – Game summary

Quarter	1	2	3	4	Total
Colts	14	10	0	7	31
Packers	10	0	3	13	26

at Lambeau Field, Green Bay, Wisconsin

- Date: November 6
- Game time: 3:25 p.m. CST
- Game weather: 68 °F (20 °C), clear
- Game attendance: 78,437
- Referee: Tony Corrente (99)
- TV announcers (CBS): Jim Nantz, Phil Simms and Tracy Wolfson
- Recap, Gamebook

Game information

First quarter

- IND – Jordan Todman 99-yard kickoff return run (Adam Vinatieri kick), 15:00. Colts 7–0. Drive: 0 plays, 0 yards, 0:13.
- GB – Mason Crosby 34-yard field goal, 10:50. Colts 7–3. Drive: 9 plays, 53 yards, 4:01.
- IND – Frank Gore 7-yard run (Adam Vinatieri kick), 4:33. Colts 14–3. Drive: 7 plays, 62 yards, 3:07.
- GB – Jordy Nelson 26-yard pass from Aaron Rodgers (Mason Crosby kick), 0:01. Colts 14–10. Drive: 4 plays, 47 yards, 1:25.

Second quarter

- IND – Adam Vinatieri 28-yard field goal, 12:09. Colts 17–10. Drive: 8 plays, 35 yards, 2:55.
- IND – Donte Moncrief 8-yard pass from Andrew Luck (Adam Vinatieri kick), 0:15. Colts 24–10. Drive: 15 plays, 96 yards, 5:33.

Third quarter

- GB – Mason Crosby 27-yard field goal, 1:49. Colts 24–13. Drive: 10 plays, 65 yards, 5:38.

Fourth quarter

- IND – Frank Gore 4-yard run (Adam Vinatieri kick), 9:39. Colts 31–13. Drive: 6 plays, 71 yards, 2:53.
- GB – Davante Adams 2-yard pass from Aaron Rodgers, 7:43. Colts 31–19. Drive: 6 plays, 75 yards, 1:55.
- GB – Randall Cobb 3-yard pass from Aaron Rodgers, 3:34. Colts 31–26. Drive: 7 plays, 80 yards, 1:59.

Top passers

- IND – Andrew Luck – 23/36, 281 yards, TD, 2 INT
- GB – Aaron Rodgers – 26/43, 297 yards, 3 TD, INT

Top rushers

- IND – Frank Gore – 19 rushes, 60 yards, 2 TD
- GB – Ty Montgomery – 7 rushes, 53 yards

Top receivers

- IND – T. Y. Hilton – 6 receptions, 82 yards
- GB – Jordy Nelson – 7 receptions, 93 yards, TD

Despite Aaron Rodgers throwing for 3 touchdowns and just one interception, the Colts got their first victory at Lambeau since 1988 with a 31–26 win. The Packers drop to 4–4 with the loss.

==== Week 10: at Tennessee Titans ====
Week Ten: Green Bay Packers at Tennessee Titans – Game summary

Quarter	1	2	3	4	Total
Packers	0	16	9	0	25
Titans	21	14	6	6	47

at Nissan Stadium, Nashville Tennessee

- Date: November 13
- Game time: 12:00 p.m. CST
- Game weather: 56 °F (13 °C), sunny
- Game attendance: 69,116
- Referee: Jeff Triplette (42)
- TV announcers (Fox): Kenny Albert, Daryl Johnston and Laura Okmin
- Recap, Gamebook

Game information

First quarter

- TEN – DeMarco Murray 75-yard run (Ryan Succop kick), 13:28. Titans 7–0. Drive: 1 play, 80 yards, 0:11.
- TEN – Delanie Walker 10-yard pass from DeMarco Murray (Ryan Succop kick), 7:04. Titans 14–0. Drive: 7 plays, 85 yards, 3:26.
- TEN – Anthony Fasano 10-yard pass from Marcus Mariota (Ryan Succop kick), 0:13. Titans 21–0. Drive: 9 plays, 71 yards, 5:17.

Second quarter

- GB – Jordy Nelson 1-yard pass from Aaron Rodgers (Mason Crosby kick), 10:53. Titans 21–7. Drive: 9 plays, 75 yards, 4:19.
- TEN – Rishard Matthews 10-yard pass from Marcus Mariota (Ryan Succop kick), 8:52. Titans 28–7. Drive: 4 plays, 75 yards, 2:04.
- GB – Mason Crosby 29-yard field goal, 4:00. Titans 28–10. Drive: 8 plays, 64 yards, 4:50.
- TEN – Kendall Wright 6-yard pass from Marcus Mariota (Ryan Succop kick), 2:00. Titans 35–10. Drive: 3 plays, 12 yards, 0:27.
- GB – James Starks 13-yard pass from Aaron Rodgers, 0:51. Titans 35–16. Drive: 6 plays, 75 yards, 1:12.

Third quarter

- GB – Aaron Rodgers 20-yard run, 9:02. Titans 35–22. Drive: 10 plays, 78 yards, 4:12.
- TEN – Tajae Sharpe 33-yard pass from Marcus Mariota, 6:35. Titans 41–22. Drive: 5 plays, 55 yards, 2:26.
- GB – Mason Crosby 38-yard field goal, 1:02. Titans 41–25. Drive: 11 plays, 46 yards, 5:30.

Fourth quarter

- TEN – Ryan Succop 51-yard field goal, 10:01. Titans 44–25. Drive: 5 plays, 26 yards, 2:04.

46-24

Top passers

- GB – Aaron Rodgers – 31/51, 371 yards, 2 TD, 2 INT
- TEN – Marcus Mariota – 19/26, 295 yards, 4 TD

Top rusher

- GB – James Starks – 7 rushes, 33 yards
- TEN – DeMarco Murray – 17 rushes, 123 yards, TD

Top receivers

- GB – Davante Adams – 6 receptions, 156 yards
- TEN – Delanie Walker – 9 receptions, 124 yards, TD

==== Week 11: at Washington Redskins ====
Week Eleven: Green Bay Packers at Washington Redskins – Game summary

Quarter	1	2	3	4	Total
Packers	0	10	0	14	24
Redskins	7	6	9	20	42

at FedExField, Landover, Maryland

- Date: November 20
- Game time: 8:30 p.m. EST/7:30 p.m. CST
- Game weather: 38 °F (3 °C), clear
- Game attendance: 77,137
- Referee: John Hussey (35)
- TV announcers (NBC): Mike Tirico, Cris Collinsworth and Michele Tafoya
- Recap, Gamebook

Game information

First quarter

- WAS – DeSean Jackson 17-yard pass from Kirk Cousins (Dustin Hopkins kick), 3:03. Redskins 7–0. Drive: 8 plays, 55 yards, 3:52.

Second quarter

- GB – Jordy Nelson 13-yard pass from Aaron Rodgers (Mason Crosby kick), 9:34. Tied 7–7. Drive: 17 plays, 75 yards, 8:29.
- GB – Mason Crosby 36-yard field goal, 3:41. Packers 10–7. Drive: 9 plays, 38 yards, 5:22.
- WAS – Robert Kelley 6-yard run, 0:45. Redskins 13–10. Drive: 8 plays, 75 yards, 2:58.

Third quarter

- WAS – Dustin Hopkins 37-yard field goal, 9:28. Redskins 16–10. Drive: 9 plays, 53 yards, 5:37.
- WAS – Jamison Crowder 44-yard pass from Kirk Cousins, 2:07. Redskins 22–10. Drive: 7 plays, 74 yards, 3:34.

Fourth quarter

- GB – James Starks 31-yard pass from Aaron Rodgers (Mason Crosby kick), 15:00. Redskins 22–17. Drive: 6 plays, 75 yards, 2:09.
- WAS – Pierre Garçon 70-yard pass from Kirk Cousins (Dustin Hopkins kick), 14:36. Redskins 29–17. Drive: 2 plays, 75 yards, 0:26.
- GB – Jared Cook 6-yard pass from Aaron Rodgers (Mason Crosby kick), 10:08. Redskins 29–24. Drive: 8 plays, 82 yards, 4:21.
- WAS – Robert Kelley 1-yard run, 3:59. Redskins 35–24. Drive: 11 plays, 81 yards, 6:10.
- WAS – Robert Kelley 4-yard run (Dustin Hopkins kick), 2:30. Redskins 42–24. Drive: 3 plays, 72 yards, 0:33.

Top passers

- GB – Aaron Rodgers – 26/41, 351 yards, 3 TD
- WAS – Kirk Cousins – 21/30, 375 yards, 3 TD

Top rushers

- GB – Aaron Rodgers – 3 rushes, 33 yards
- WAS – Robert Kelley – 24 rushes, 137 yards, 3 TD

Top receivers

- GB – Jared Cook – 6 receptions, 105 yards, TD
- WAS – Pierre Garçon – 6 receptions, 116 yards, TD

The Packers fell to 4–6 for the first time since 2006. Days later, Aaron Rodgers said he believed the Packers could "run the table", which proved to be prophetic as the Packers would then go on an 8-game winning streak (6 regular-season, 2 playoff) that lasted until the NFC Championship against the Falcons.

==== Week 12: at Philadelphia Eagles ====
Week Twelve: Green Bay Packers at Philadelphia Eagles – Game summary

Quarter	1	2	3	4	Total
Packers	7	7	3	10	27
Eagles	7	3	3	0	13

at Lincoln Financial Field, Philadelphia

- Date: November 28
- Game time: 8:30 p.m. EST/7:30 p.m. CST
- Game weather: 47 °F (8 °C), cloudy
- Game attendance: 69,596
- Referee: Terry McAulay (77)
- TV announcers (ESPN): Sean McDonough, Jon Gruden and Lisa Salters
- Recap, Gamebook

Game information

First quarter

- GB – Davante Adams 12-yard pass from Aaron Rodgers (Mason Crosby kick), 9:56. Packers 7–0. Drive: 10 plays, 75 yards, 5:09.
- PHI – Carson Wentz 1-yard run (Caleb Sturgis kick), 3:49. Tied 7–7. Drive: 11 plays, 81 yards, 6:11.

Second quarter

- GB – Davante Adams 20-yard pass from Aaron Rodgers (Mason Crosby kick), 15:00. Packers 14–7. Drive: 9 plays, 75 yards, 3:47.
- PHI – Caleb Sturgis 48-yard field goal, 0:20. Packers 14–10. Drive: 13 plays, 69 yards, 3:03.

Third quarter

- GB – Mason Crosby 33-yard field goal, 8:51. Packers 17–10. Drive: 5 plays, 57 yards, 2:32.
- PHI – Caleb Sturgis 50-yard field goal, 5:26. Packers 17–13. Drive: 11 plays, 43 yards, 3:27.

Fourth quarter

- GB – Aaron Ripkowski 1-yard run (Mason Crosby kick), 13:56. Packers 24–13. Drive: 13 plays, 75 yards, 6:28.
- GB – Mason Crosby 32-yard field goal, 2:00. Packers 27–13. Drive: 17 plays, 78 yards, 8:21.

Top passers

- GB – Aaron Rodgers – 30/39, 313 yards, 2 TD
- PHI – Carson Wentz – 24/36, 254 yards, INT

Top rushers

- GB – James Starks – 17 rushes, 41 yards
- PHI – Wendell Smallwood – 9 rushes, 37 yards

Top receivers

- GB – Davante Adams – 5 receptions, 113 yards, 2 TD
- PHI – Dorial Green-Beckham – 6 receptions, 82 yards

With the 27–13 win, the Packers improved to 5–6. This was the start of an eight-game winning streak going into the NFC Championship against the Falcons.

==== Week 13: vs. Houston Texans ====
Week Thirteen: Houston Texans at Green Bay Packers – Game summary

Quarter	1	2	3	4	Total
Texans	0	0	7	6	13
Packers	0	7	0	14	21

at Lambeau Field, Green Bay, Wisconsin

- Date: December 4
- Game time: 12:00 p.m. CST
- Game weather: 32 °F (0 °C), snow
- Game attendance: 77,867
- Referee: Gene Steratore (114)
- TV announcers (CBS): Jim Nantz, Phil Simms and Tracy Wolfson
- Recap, Gamebook

Game information

First quarter

- No scoring plays

Second quarter

- GB – Randall Cobb 9-yard pass from Aaron Rodgers (Mason Crosby kick), 8:10. Packers 7–0. Drive: 10 plays, 50 yards, 5:58.

Third quarter

- HOU – Ryan Griffin 6-yard pass from Brock Osweiler (Nick Novak kick), 7:37. Tied 7–7. Drive: 10 plays, 63 yards, 4:57.

Fourth quarter

- GB – Jordy Nelson 32-yard pass from Aaron Rodgers (Mason Crosby kick), 12:50. Packers 14–7. Drive: 12 plays, 98 yards, 3:20.
- GB – Aaron Ripkowski 3-yard run (Mason Crosby kick), 4:18. Packers 21–7. Drive: 8 plays, 89 yards, 4:41.
- HOU – DeAndre Hopkins 44-yard pass from Brock Osweiler (kick no good), 2:00. Packers 21–13. Drive: 6 plays, 78 yards, 2:20.

Top passers

- HOU – Brock Osweiler – 21/34, 213 yards, 2 TD
- GB – Aaron Rodgers – 20/30, 209 yards, 2 TD

Top rushers

- HOU – Jonathan Grimes – 5 rushes, 43 yards
- GB – Ty Montgomery – 6 rushes, 40 yards

Top receivers

- HOU – C. J. Fiedorowicz – 6 receptions, 44 yards
- GB – Jordy Nelson – 8 receptions, 118 yards, TD

The Packers beat the Texans for the first time at home 21–13 to improve to 6–6 at a snowy Lambeau Field. With the Texans' loss, no team has an undefeated record at Lambeau. This was also the first time the Packers had beaten a Houston NFL team at home.

==== Week 14: vs. Seattle Seahawks ====
Week Fourteen: Seattle Seahawks at Green Bay Packers – Game summary

Quarter	1	2	3	4	Total
Seahawks	3	0	0	7	10
Packers	7	14	7	10	38

at Lambeau Field, Green Bay, Wisconsin

- Date: December 11
- Game time: 3:25 p.m. CST
- Game weather: 26 °F (−3 °C), cloudy
- Game attendance: 78,057
- Referee: Walt Coleman (65)
- TV announcers (Fox): Joe Buck, Troy Aikman and Erin Andrews
- Recap, Gamebook

Game information

First quarter

- GB – Davante Adams 66-yard pass from Aaron Rodgers (Mason Crosby kick), 13:41. Packers 7–0. Drive: 3 plays, 75 yards, 1:30.
- SEA – Steven Hauschka 28-yard field goal, 6:19. Packers 7–3. Drive: 13 plays, 64 yards, 7:14.

Second quarter

- GB – Ty Montgomery 1-yard run (Mason Crosby kick), 9:41. Packers 14–3. Drive: 4 plays, 26 yards, 2:17.
- GB – Jordy Nelson 9-yard pass from Aaron Rodgers (Mason Crosby kick), 5:21. Packers 21–3. Drive: 5 plays, 48 yards, 2:44.

Third quarter

- GB – Jordy Nelson 3-yard pass from Aaron Rodgers (Mason Crosby kick), 4:31. Packers 28–3. Drive: 7 plays, 32 yards, 3:16.

Fourth quarter

- GB – Mason Crosby 38-yard field goal, 10:12. Packers 31–3. Drive: 5 plays, 19 yards, 1:15.
- SEA – Tanner McEvoy 21-yard pass from Russell Wilson (Steven Hauschka kick), 8:26. Packers 31–10. Drive: 7 plays, 75 yards, 2:10.
- GB – Jeff Janis 19-yard run (Mason Crosby kick), 5:50. Packers 38–10. Drive: 1 plays, 19 yards, 0:07.

Top passers

- SEA – Russell Wilson – 22/39, 240 yards, TD, 5 INT
- GB – Aaron Rodgers – 18/23, 246 yards, 3 TD

Top rushers

- SEA – Thomas Rawls – 12 rushes, 67 yards
- GB – Ty Montgomery – 9 rushes, 41 yards, TD

Top receivers

- SEA – Doug Baldwin – 6 receptions, 46 yards
- GB – Davante Adams – 4 receptions, 104 yards, TD

The Packers intercepted Russell Wilson a career-high five times as the Packers routed the Seahawks 38–10 to improve to 7–6. Aaron Rodgers, with his 3:0 TD-INT ratio in this game, posted a 150.8 passer rating, the highest allowed by the Seattle defense (which was without safety Earl Thomas, who was out for the year with a broken leg) since Pete Carroll became the Seahawks' head coach in 2010.

==== Week 15: at Chicago Bears ====
Week Fifteen: Green Bay Packers at Chicago Bears – Game summary

Quarter	1	2	3	4	Total
Packers	7	3	17	3	30
Bears	0	10	0	17	27

at Soldier Field, Chicago

- Date: December 18
- Game time: 12:00 p.m. CST
- Game weather: 11 °F (−12 °C), sunny
- Game attendance: 61,137
- Referee: Ronald Torbert (62)
- TV announcers (Fox): Kevin Burkhardt, John Lynch and Pam Oliver
- Recap, Gamebook

Game information

First quarter

- GB – Ty Montgomery 4-yard run (Mason Crosby kick), 10:02. Packers 7–0. Drive: 9 plays, 73 yards, 5:03.

Second quarter

- CHI – Connor Barth 26-yard field goal, 6:05. Packers 7–3. Drive: 10 plays, 64 yards, 5:12.
- CHI – Josh Bellamy 10-yard pass from Matt Barkley (Connor Barth kick), 2:23. Bears 10–7. Drive: 4 plays, 55 yards, 2:08.
- GB – Mason Crosby 34-yard field goal, 0:37. Tied 10–10. Drive: 9 plays, 69 yards, 1:44.

Third quarter

- GB – Mason Crosby 18-yard field goal, 11:15. Packers 13–10. Drive: 6 plays, 16 yards, 3:43.
- GB – Ty Montgomery 3-yard run (Mason Crosby kick), 4:57. Packers 20–10. Drive: 7 plays, 58 yards, 4:35.
- GB – Christine Michael 42-yard run (Mason Crosby kick), 1:13. Packers 27–10. Drive: 2 plays, 45 yards, 0:52.

Fourth quarter

- CHI – Alshon Jeffery 8-yard pass from Matt Barkley (Connor Barth kick), 13:31. Packers 27–17. Drive: 6 plays, 75 yards, 2:36.
- CHI – Jordan Howard 9-yard run (Connor Barth kick), 7:40. Packers 27–24. Drive: 9 plays, 78 yards, 3:37.
- CHI – Connor Barth 22-yard field goal, 1:23. Tied 27–27. Drive: 14 plays, 75 yards, 4:23.
- GB – Mason Crosby 32-yard field goal, 0:02. Packers 30–27. Drive: 5 plays, 59 yards, 1:19.

Top passers

- GB – Aaron Rodgers – 19/31, 252 yards
- CHI – Matt Barkley – 30/43, 362 yards, 2 TD, 3 INT

Top rushers

- GB – Ty Montgomery – 16 rushes, 162 yards, 2 TD
- CHI – Jordan Howard – 17 rushes, 90 yards, TD

Top receivers

- GB – Jordy Nelson – 7 receptions, 124 yards
- CHI – Cameron Meredith – 9 receptions, 104 yards

The Packers led 27–10, but the Bears came back and tied the game at 27. Aaron Rodgers then threw a 60-yard pass to Jordy Nelson to set up a Mason Crosby field goal to win 30–27 and improve to 8–6.

With the win, the Packers tied the all-time series against the Bears at 94–94–6, the first time since 1933 that the Bears did not lead the all-time series outright.

==== Week 16: vs. Minnesota Vikings ====
Week Sixteen: Minnesota Vikings at Green Bay Packers – Game summary

Quarter	1	2	3	4	Total
Vikings	3	10	0	12	25
Packers	14	14	0	10	38

at Lambeau Field, Green Bay, Wisconsin

- Date: December 24
- Game time: 12:00 p.m. CST
- Game weather: 37 °F (3 °C), cloudy
- Game attendance: 77,856
- Referee: Jeff Triplette (42)
- TV announcers (Fox): Joe Buck, Troy Aikman and Erin Andrews
- Recap, Gamebook

Game information

First quarter

- GB – Jordy Nelson 21-yard pass from Aaron Rodgers (Mason Crosby kick), 7:13. Packers 7–0. Drive: 5 plays, 61 yards, 2:40.
- MIN – Kai Forbath 22-yard field goal, 3:37. Packers 7–3. Drive: 8 plays, 65 yards, 3:36.
- GB – Davante Adams 20-yard pass from Aaron Rodgers (Mason Crosby kick), 1:49. Packers 14–3. Drive: 4 plays, 74 yards, 1:48.

Second quarter

- MIN – Kai Forbath 26-yard field goal, 12:30. Packers 14–6. Drive: 12 plays, 67 yards, 4:19.
- GB – Jordy Nelson 2-yard pass from Aaron Rodgers (Mason Crosby kick), 8:11. Packers 21–6. Drive: 3 plays, 42 yards, 1:36.
- MIN – Adam Thielen 71-yard pass from Sam Bradford (Kai Forbath kick), 7:24. Packers 21–13. Drive: 2 plays, 75 yards, 0:47.
- GB – Aaron Rodgers 6-yard run (Mason Crosby kick), 0:24. Packers 28–13. Drive: 5 plays, 54 yards, 0:30.

Third quarter

- No scoring plays

Fourth quarter

- GB – Mason Crosby 48-yard field goal, 14:55. Packers 31–13. Drive: 10 plays, 14 yards, 4:05.
- GB – Richard Rodgers 13-yard pass from Aaron Rodgers (Mason Crosby kick), 9:02. Packers 38–13. Drive: 7 plays, 53 yards, 4:23.
- MIN – Stefon Diggs 3-yard pass from Sam Bradford (kick failed, hit right upright), 4:20. Packers 38–19. Drive: 13 plays, 75 yards, 4:42.
- MIN – Adam Thielen 8-yard pass from Sam Bradford (run failed), 0:32. Packers 38–25. Drive: 10 plays, 34 yards, 3:07.

Top passers

- MIN – Sam Bradford – 34/50, 382 yards, 3 TD
- GB – Aaron Rodgers – 28/38, 347 yards, 4 TD

Top rushers

- MIN – Jerick McKinnon – 11 rushes, 50 yards
- GB – Ty Montgomery – 9 rushes, 23 yards

Top receivers

- MIN – Adam Thielen – 12 receptions, 202 yards, 2 TD
- GB – Jordy Nelson – 9 receptions, 154 yards, 2 TD

The Packers defeated the reeling Vikings 38–25 to improve to 9–6 as Rodgers became the first quarterback to throw for 300 yards against the Vikings defense. With the win, the Packers eliminated the now 7-8 Vikings from the playoffs.

==== Week 17: at Detroit Lions ====
Week Seventeen: Green Bay Packers at Detroit Lions – Game summary

Quarter	1	2	3	4	Total
Packers	0	10	7	14	31
Lions	0	14	0	10	24

at Ford Field, Detroit, Michigan

- Date: January 1, 2017
- Game time: 8:30 p.m. EST/7:30 p.m. CST
- Game weather: Played indoors (dome stadium)
- Game attendance: 66,345
- Referee: Jerome Boger (23)
- TV announcers (NBC): Al Michaels, Cris Collinsworth and Michele Tafoya
- Recap, Gamebook

Game information

First quarter

- No scoring plays

Second quarter

- GB – Aaron Ripkowski 7-yard pass from Aaron Rodgers (Mason Crosby kick), 10:54. Packers 7–0. Drive: 8 plays, 71 yards, 4:09.
- DET – Zach Zenner 1-yard run (Matt Prater kick), 5:03. Tied 7–7. Drive: 11 plays, 80 yards, 5:47.
- DET – Golden Tate 3-yard pass from Matthew Stafford (Matt Prater kick), 10:54. Lions 14–7. Drive: 11 plays, 69 yards, 2:08.
- GB – Mason Crosby 53-yard field goal, 0:03. Lions 14–10. Drive: 5 plays, 40 yards, 0:23.

Third quarter

- GB – Davante Adams 3-yard pass from Aaron Rodgers (Mason Crosby kick), 9:27. Packers 17–14. Drive: 10 plays, 75 yards, 5:37.

Fourth quarter

- GB – Geronimo Allison 10-yard pass from Aaron Rodgers (kick failed, wide right), 10:13. Packers 23–14. Drive: 10 plays, 81 yards, 4:37.
- DET – Matt Prater 54-yard field goal, 7:47. Packers 23–17. Drive: 7 plays, 33 yards, 2:20.
- GB – Davante Adams 9-yard pass from Aaron Rodgers (Aaron Rodgers–Davante Adams pass), 2:54. Packers 31–17. Drive: 11 plays, 75 yards, 4:52.
- DET – Anquan Boldin 35-yard pass from Matthew Stafford (Matt Prater kick), 0:22. Packers 31–24. Drive: 1 play, 35 yards, 0:09.

Top passers

- GB – Aaron Rodgers – 27/39, 300 yards, 4 TD
- DET – Matthew Stafford – 26/41, 347 yards, 2 TD, INT

Top rushers

- GB – Aaron Ripkowski – 9 rushes, 61 yards
- DET – Zach Zenner – 20 rushes, 69 yards, TD

Top receivers

- GB – Geronimo Allison – 4 receptions, 91 yards, TD
- DET – Golden Tate – 6 receptions, 77 yards, TD

The Packers successfully ran the table as they improved to 10–6 and won the NFC North, matching last year's record.

=== Postseason ===
==== NFC Wild Card Playoffs: vs. (5) New York Giants ====
NFC Wild Card Playoffs: (5) New York Giants at (4) Green Bay Packers – Game summary

Quarter	1	2	3	4	Total
Giants	3	3	7	0	13
Packers	0	14	10	14	38

at Lambeau Field, Green Bay, Wisconsin

- Date: January 8, 2017
- Game time: 3:40 p.m. CST
- Game weather: 14 °F (−10 °C), cloudy
- Game attendance: 77,549
- Referee: Ed Hochuli (85)
- TV announcers (Fox): Joe Buck, Troy Aikman, Erin Andrews and Chris Myers
- Recap, Gamebook

Game information

First quarter

- NYG – Robbie Gould 26-yard field goal, 5:44. Giants 3–0. Drive: 9 plays, 54 yards, 3:34.

Second quarter

- NYG – Robbie Gould 40-yard field goal, 7:24. Giants 6–0. Drive: 7 plays, 70 yards, 2:47.
- GB – Davante Adams 5-yard pass from Aaron Rodgers (Mason Crosby kick), 2:20. Packers 7–6. Drive: 3 plays, 38 yards, 1:25.
- GB – Randall Cobb 42-yard pass from Aaron Rodgers (Mason Crosby kick), 0:00. Packers 14–6. Drive: 8 plays, 80 yards, 1:38.

Third quarter

- NYG – Tavarres King 41-yard pass from Eli Manning (Robbie Gould kick), 5:16. Packers 14–13. Drive: 2 plays, 41 yards, 0:45.
- GB – Randall Cobb 30-yard pass from Aaron Rodgers (Mason Crosby kick), 2:53. Packers 21–13. Drive: 4 plays, 63 yards, 2:23.
- GB – Mason Crosby 32-yard field goal, 0:21. Packers 24–13. Drive: 5 plays, 23 yards, 1:29.

Fourth quarter

- GB – Randall Cobb 16-yard pass from Aaron Rodgers (Mason Crosby kick), 9:19. Packers 31–13. Drive: 10 plays, 80 yards, 5:14.
- GB – Aaron Ripkowski 1-yard run (Mason Crosby kick), 2:43. Packers 38–13. Drive: 9 plays, 55 yards, 5:48.

Top passers

- NYG – Eli Manning – 23/44, 299 yards, TD, INT
- GB – Aaron Rodgers – 25/40, 362 yards, 4 TD

Top rushers

- NYG – Paul Perkins – 10 rushes, 30 yards
- GB – Christine Michael – 10 rushes, 47 yards

Top receivers

- NYG – Tavarres King – 3 receptions, 73 yards, TD
- GB – Davante Adams – 8 receptions, 125 yards, TD

The Packers hosted the fifth seeded New York Giants, who defeated the Packers at Lambeau in the 2007 and 2011 playoffs. It was also a rematch of week five, which was won by the Packers 23–16. The Giants had one of the best defenses in the NFL going into the game, but Rodgers threw for 4 touchdowns, including a 42-yard Hail Mary pass to Cobb at the end of the first half as the Packers would lead 14–6. The Packers went on to rout the Giants 38–13 and would travel to face the top-seeded Cowboys.

==== NFC Divisional Playoffs: at (1) Dallas Cowboys ====
NFC Divisional Playoffs: (4) Green Bay Packers at (1) Dallas Cowboys – Game summary

Quarter	1	2	3	4	Total
Packers	7	14	7	6	34
Cowboys	3	10	0	18	31

at AT&T Stadium, Arlington, Texas

- Date: January 15, 2017
- Game time: 3:40 p.m. CST
- Game weather: Played indoors (retractable roof closed)
- Game attendance: 93,396
- Referee: Tony Corrente (99)
- TV announcers (Fox): Joe Buck, Troy Aikman, Erin Andrews and Chris Myers
- Recap, Gamebook

Game information

First quarter

- DAL – Dan Bailey 50-yard field goal, 11:23. Cowboys 3–0. Drive: 8 plays, 43 yards, 3:37.
- GB – Richard Rodgers 34-yard pass from Aaron Rodgers (Mason Crosby kick), 8:58. Packers 7–3. Drive: 5 plays, 75 yards, 2:25.

Second quarter

- GB – Ty Montgomery 3-yard run (Mason Crosby kick), 14:05. Packers 14–3. Drive: 13 plays, 90 yards, 5:47.
- GB – Ty Montgomery 1-yard run (Mason Crosby kick), 7:37. Packers 21–3. Drive: 9 plays, 80 yards, 5:24.
- DAL – Dez Bryant 34-yard pass from Dak Prescott (Dan Bailey kick), 6:03. Packers 21–10. Drive: 4 plays, 75 yards, 1:34.
- DAL – Dan Bailey 33-yard field goal, 1:00. Packers 21–13. Drive: 10 plays, 36 yards, 3:55.

Third quarter

- GB – Jared Cook 3-yard pass from Aaron Rodgers (Mason Crosby kick), 11:25. Packers 28–13. Drive: 6 plays, 75 yards, 3:35.

Fourth quarter

- DAL – Jason Witten 6-yard pass from Dak Prescott (Dan Bailey kick), 11:39. Packers 28–20. Drive: 10 plays, 59 yards, 5:40.
- DAL – Dez Bryant 7-yard pass from Dak Prescott (Dak Prescott run), 4:08. Tied 28–28. Drive: 11 plays, 80 yards, 5:06.
- GB – Mason Crosby 56-yard field goal, 1:33. Packers 31–28. Drive: 8 plays, 37 yards, 2:35.
- DAL – Dan Bailey 52-yard field goal, 0:35. Tied 31–31. Drive: 6 plays, 42 yards, 0:58.
- GB – Mason Crosby 51-yard field goal, 0:00. Packers 34–31. Drive: 6 plays, 43 yards, 0:35.

Top passers

- GB – Aaron Rodgers – 28/43, 356 yards, 2 TD, INT
- DAL – Dak Prescott – 24/38, 302 yards, 3 TD, INT

Top rushers

- GB – Ty Montgomery – 11 rushes, 47 yards, 2 TD
- DAL – Ezekiel Elliott – 22 rushes, 125 yards

Top receivers

- GB – Jared Cook – 6 receptions, 104 yards, TD
- DAL – Dez Bryant – 9 receptions, 132 yards, 2 TD

This game was a rematch of week six, a game the Packers lost 16–30. However, unlike the previous meeting of these two teams, the Packers were expected to give the Cowboys difficulties. Dallas clinched the #1 seed as well as home-field advantage, but the Packers were able to prevail and upset the Cowboys with a Mason Crosby field goal as time expired 34–31.

==== NFC Championship: at (2) Atlanta Falcons ====
NFC Championship: (4) Green Bay Packers at (2) Atlanta Falcons – Game summary

Quarter	1	2	3	4	Total
Packers	0	0	15	6	21
Falcons	10	14	13	7	44

at Georgia Dome, Atlanta

- Date: January 22, 2017
- Game time: 3:05 p.m. EST/2:05 p.m. CST
- Game weather: Played indoors (dome stadium)
- Game attendance: 71,127
- Referee: Bill Vinovich (52)
- TV announcers (Fox): Joe Buck, Troy Aikman, Erin Andrews and Chris Myers
- Recap, Gamebook

Game information

First quarter

- ATL – Mohamed Sanu 5-yard pass from Matt Ryan (Matt Bryant kick), 8:30. Falcons 7–0. Drive: 13 plays, 80 yards, 6:36.
- ATL – Matt Bryant 28-yard field goal, 0:17. Falcons 10–0. Drive: 12 plays, 59 yards, 5:21.

Second quarter

- ATL – Matt Ryan 14-yard run (Matt Bryantkick), 2:43. Falcons 17–0. Drive: 9 plays, 80 yards, 3:35.
- ATL – Julio Jones 5-yard pass from Matt Ryan (Matt Bryant kick), 0:07. Falcons 24–0. Drive: 9 plays, 68 yards, 1:47.

Third quarter

- ATL – Julio Jones 73-yard pass from Matt Ryan (Matt Bryant kick), 14:03. Falcons 31–0. Drive: 2 plays, 75 yards, 0:51.
- GB – Davante Adams 2-yard pass from Aaron Rodgers (Mason Crosby kick), 9:19. Falcons 31–7. Drive: 12 plays, 75 yards, 4:32.
- ATL – Devonta Freeman 4-yard pass from Matt Ryan (kick failed, wide right), 4:11. Falcons 37–7. Drive: 8 plays, 75 yards, 5:08.
- GB – Jordy Nelson 3-yard pass from Aaron Rodgers (Aaron Ripkowski run), 0:38. Falcons 37–15. Drive: 9 plays, 75 yards, 3:33.

Fourth quarter

- ATL – Tevin Coleman 3-yard run (Matt Bryant kick), 12:07. Falcons 44–15. Drive: 7 plays, 33 yards, 3:31.
- GB – Jared Cook 1-yard pass from Aaron Rodgers (run failed), 6:43. Falcons 44–21. Drive: 14 plays, 75 yards, 5:24.

Top passers

- GB – Aaron Rodgers – 27/45, 287 yards, 3 TD, INT
- ATL – Matt Ryan – 27/38, 392 yards, 4 TD

Top rushers

- GB – Aaron Rodgers – 4 rushes, 46 yards
- ATL – Devonta Freeman – 14 rushes, 42 yards

Top receivers

- GB – Randall Cobb – 6 receptions, 82 yards
- ATL – Julio Jones – 9 receptions, 180 yards, 2 TD

This was the end of an 8-game winning streak for the Packers as they were crushed 44–21. The Packers were scoreless until they scored a touchdown when they were behind 31–0 as Atlanta took an early 7–0 lead and never trailed from there. Green Bay's 24-0 halftime deficit was also then the largest deficit Aaron Rodgers had faced in his entire career. This would later be surpassed with the 27-0 halftime deficit the Packers would face in the 2019 NFC Championship, which resulted in a 37-20 loss to the San Francisco 49ers.

== Statistics ==
=== Regular season statistical leaders ===
Statistic	Player(s)	Value
Passing yards	Aaron Rodgers	4,428
Passing touchdowns	Aaron Rodgers	40
Rushing yards	Ty Montgomery	457
Rushing touchdowns	Aaron Rodgers	4
Receptions	Jordy Nelson	97
Receiving yards	Jordy Nelson	1,257
Receiving touchdowns	Jordy Nelson	14
Kickoff return yards	Ty Montgomery	366
Punt return yards	Trevor Davis	115
Tackles	Morgan Burnett	93
Sacks	Nick Perry	11.0
Interceptions	Ha Ha Clinton-Dix	5

=== Playoffs statistical leaders ===
Statistic	Player(s)	Value
Passing yards	Aaron Rodgers	1,004
Passing touchdowns	Aaron Rodgers	9
Rushing yards	Ty Montgomery	91
Rushing touchdowns	Ty Montgomery	2
Receptions	Randall Cobb; Jared Cook	16
Receiving yards	Randall Cobb	260
Receiving touchdowns	Randall Cobb	3
Kickoff return yards	Jeff Janis	77
Punt return yards	Micah Hyde	50
Tackles	Jake Ryan	20
Sacks	Micah Hyde; Clay Matthews III; Julius Peppers; Nick Perry	1.0
Interceptions	Damarious Randall; Micah Hyde	1

=== Best game performances ===
	Player(s)	Value	Opponent
Passing yards	Aaron Rodgers	371	@ Tennessee Titans
Passing touchdowns	Aaron Rodgers	4	Detroit Lions @ Atlanta Falcons; Minnesota Vikings @ Detroit Lions; New York Giants
Rushing yards	Ty Montgomery	162	@ Chicago Bears
Rushing touchdowns	Ty Montgomery	2	@ Dallas Cowboys @ Chicago Bears
Receiving yards	Davante Adams	156	@ Tennessee Titans
Receiving touchdowns	Randall Cobb	3	New York Giants
Tackles	Jake Ryan	12	New York Giants
Sacks	Nick Perry	2	Detroit Lions; Minnesota Vikings
Interceptions	Ha Ha Clinton-Dix; Damarious Randall; Ha Ha Clinton-Dix	2	Indianapolis Colts; Seattle Seahawks; Chicago Bears

=== League rankings ===
Category	Total yards	Yards per game	NFL rank (out of 32)
Passing offense	4,199	262.4	7
Rushing offense	1,701	106.3	20
Total offense	5,900	368.8	8
Passing defense	4,308	269.2	31
Rushing defense	1,515	94.7	8
Total defense	5,823	363.9	22

Statistical values are correct through the end of the season

== Awards ==
Recipient	Award(s)
Davante Adams	Week 7: NFC Offensive Player of the Week
David Bakhtiari	2016 All-Pro second team
Ha Ha Clinton-Dix	Probowler; 2016 All-Pro second team Week 15: NFC Defensive Player of the Week
T. J. Lang	Probowler
Aaron Rodgers	Probowler; Week 7: FedEx Air Player of the Week (Quarterbacks); Week 14: NFC Offensive Player of the Week; Week 14: FedEx Air Player of the Week (Quarterbacks); Week 16: NFC Offensive Player of the Week; Week 16: FedEx Air Player of the Week (Quarterbacks); NFC Player of the Month – December
