= Justin Perillo =

American football player (born 1991)

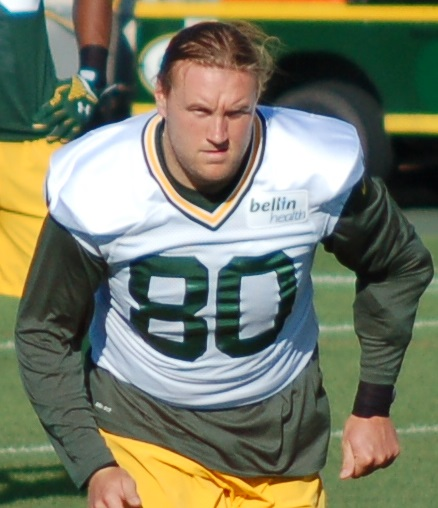
- Perillo with the Green Bay Packers in 2015

Profile
- Position: Tight end

Personal information
- Born: January 5, 1991 (age 35); Wilmington, Delaware, U.S.
- Listed height: 6 ft 3 in (1.91 m)
- Listed weight: 250 lb (113 kg)

Career information
- High school: Tatnall (Wilmington)
- College: Maine
- NFL draft: 2014: undrafted

Career history
- Green Bay Packers (2014–2016); Chicago Bears (2016–2017)*
- * Offseason or practice squad member only

Career NFL statistics
- Receptions: 15
- Receiving yards: 137
- Receiving touchdowns: 1
- Stats at Pro Football Reference

Justin Michael Perillo (born January 5, 1991) is an American former professional football player who was a tight end in the National Football League (NFL). He played college football for the Maine Black Bears and was signed by the Green Bay Packers as an undrafted free agent in 2014.

== Professional career ==
Pre-draft measurables
Height	Weight	40-yard dash	10-yard split	20-yard split	20-yard shuttle	Three-cone drill	Vertical jump	Broad jump	Bench press	Wonderlic
6 ft 3 in (1.91 m)	250 lb (113 kg)	4.76 s	2.70 s	1.67 s	4.36 s	6.98 s	30.5 in (0.77 m)	9 ft 1 in (2.77 m)	19 reps	13
All values are from Pro Day

=== Green Bay Packers ===
After going undrafted in the 2014 NFL draft, Perillo signed with the Green Bay Packers on May 12, 2014. On August 30, 2014, he was released by the Packers during final team cuts. Perillo was signed to the Packers' practice squad the following day. He was signed from the practice squad to the active roster on November 15, 2014, where he spent the rest of his rookie season.

For the second straight season, Perillo was released by the Packers during final team cuts on September 5, 2015. On September 7, 2015, he was again signed to the Packers' practice squad. Perillo was signed from the practice squad to the active roster on October 14, 2015. He recorded his first NFL reception, a 21-yard sideline catch from Aaron Rodgers in a Week 6 game against the San Diego Chargers. Perillo had a breakout game against the Detroit Lions in Week 10, where he hauled in five receptions for 58 yards and scored his first NFL touchdown late in the fourth quarter.

On November 19, 2016, Perillo was released by the Packers.

=== Chicago Bears ===
On November 29, 2016, Perillo was signed to the Bears' practice squad. He re-signed with the team on February 10, 2017. On May 1, 2017, Perillo was waived by the Bears.

=== Statistics ===
Source: NFL.com

Year	Team	G	GS	Receiving					Fumbles	
Year	Team	G	GS	Rec	Yds	Avg	Lng	TD	FUM	Lost
Regular season
2014	GB	2	0	0	0	0.0	0	0	0	0
2015	GB	9	0	11	102	9.3	24	1	0	0
2016	GB	9	1	4	35	8.8	13	0	0	0
Total		20	1	15	137	9.1	24	1	0	0
Postseason
2015	GB	1	0	0	0	0.0	0	0	0	0
Total		1	0	0	0	0.0	0	0	0	0
