= Brett Goode =

American football player (born 1984)

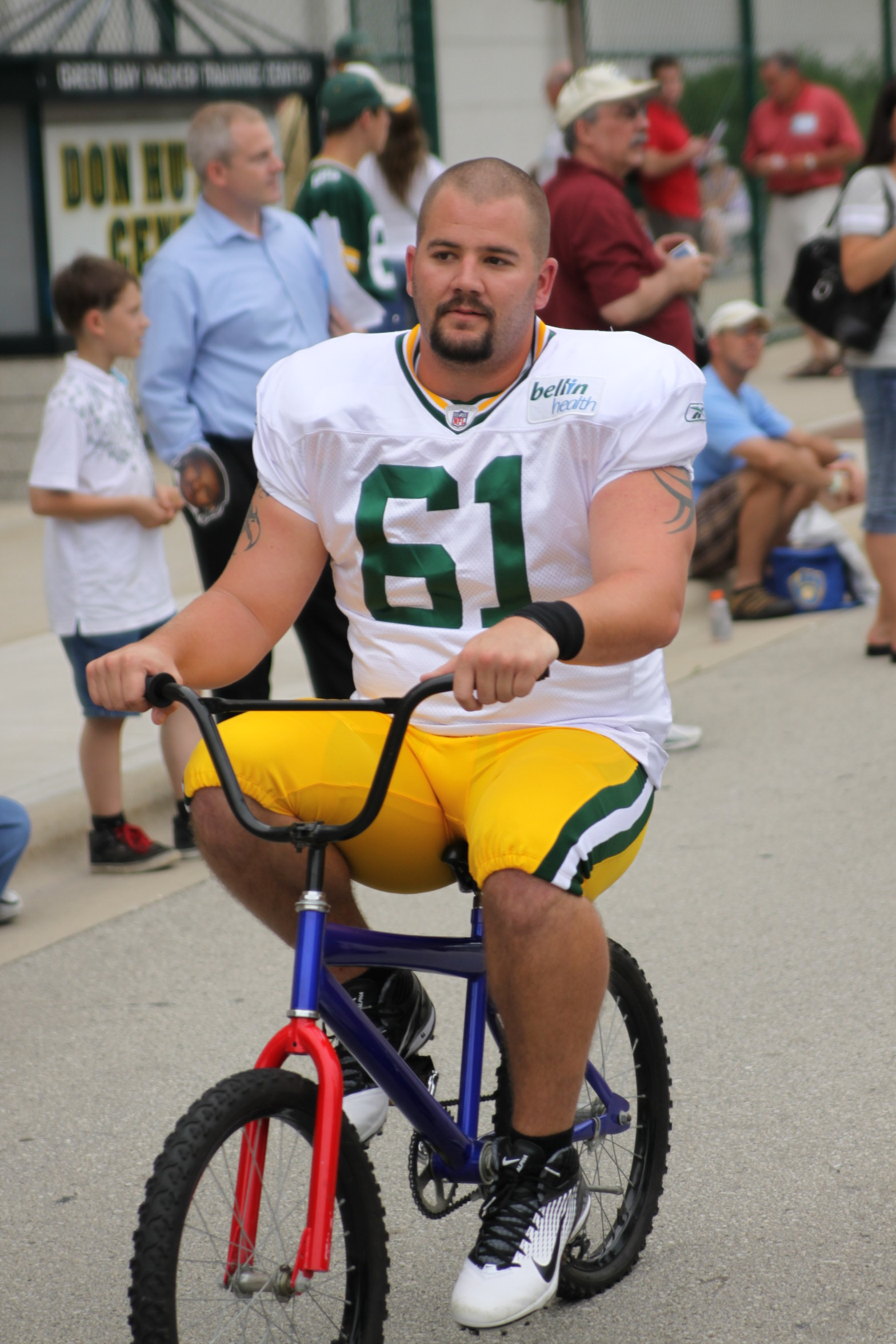
- Goode with the Green Bay Packers in 2011

No. 61
- Position: Long snapper

Personal information
- Born: November 2, 1984 (age 42); Pampa, Texas, U.S.
- Listed height: 6 ft 1 in (1.85 m)
- Listed weight: 255 lb (116 kg)

Career information
- High school: Northside (Fort Smith, Arkansas)
- College: Arkansas (2003–2006)
- NFL draft: 2007: undrafted

Career history
- Jacksonville Jaguars (2007)*; Green Bay Packers (2008–2017)
- * Offseason or practice squad member only

Awards and highlights
- Super Bowl champion (XLV)

Career NFL statistics
- Games played: 152
- Total tackles: 14
- Fumble recoveries: 1
- Stats at Pro Football Reference

Brett Jackson Goode (GEWD; born November 2, 1984) is an American former professional football player who was a long snapper for the Green Bay Packers of the National Football League (NFL). He played college football for the Arkansas Razorbacks and was signed by the Jacksonville Jaguars as an undrafted free agent in 2007. He was also a member of the Packers squad that won Super Bowl XLV.

== Professional career ==
Pre-draft measurables
| Height | Weight |
|---|---|
| 6 ft 1 1/4 in (1.86 m) | 232 lb (105 kg) |
Values from Pro Day

=== Jacksonville Jaguars ===
After going undrafted in the 2007 NFL draft, Goode signed with the Jacksonville Jaguars on April 29, 2007. On August 20, 2007, he was waived by the Jaguars. Goode was signed by the Jaguars on March 5, 2008. On June 16, 2008, he was waived by the Jaguars for the second straight season.

=== Green Bay Packers ===
On September 1, 2008, Goode was signed by the Green Bay Packers after starting long snapper J. J. Jansen suffered a season-ending knee injury. He signed a two-year contract with the Packers on January 1, 2011. On October 13, 2012, Goode signed a three-year extension with the Packers. He was placed on injured reserve on December 22, 2015, after Goode tore his ACL in a game against the Oakland Raiders. On September 5, 2016, Goode re-signed with the Packers.

On August 12, 2017, the Packers re-signed Goode to a one-year contract. He was placed on injured reserve on September 25, 2017, after suffering a hamstring injury. He reached an injury settlement with the Packers the next day. He re-signed with the Packers on November 14, 2017.

== Personal life ==
Goode married Monica Cayce (known for her fourth-place finish on The Amazing Race 9 with her then-boyfriend and now ex-husband Joseph) on November 1, 2014, where his groomsmen included teammates Tim Masthay, Aaron Rodgers, and Mason Crosby.
