= LaDarius Gunter =

American football player (born 1992)

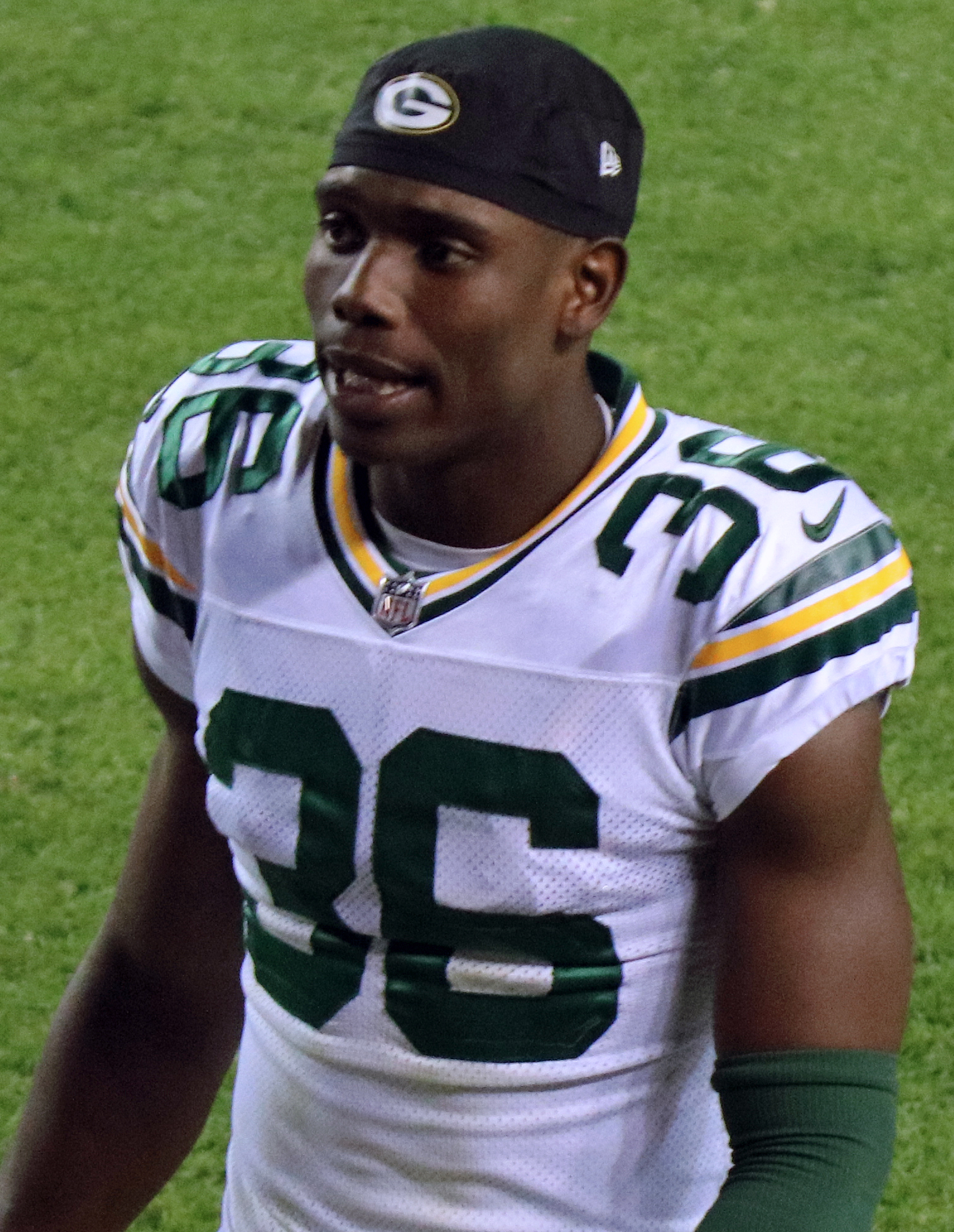
- Gunter with the Green Bay Packers in 2017

No. 36, 23
- Position: Cornerback

Personal information
- Born: May 13, 1992 (age 34); Montgomery, Alabama, U.S.
- Listed height: 6 ft 2 in (1.88 m)
- Listed weight: 200 lb (91 kg)

Career information
- High school: Jefferson Davis (Montgomery)
- College: Miami (FL)
- NFL draft: 2015: undrafted

Career history
- Green Bay Packers (2015–2017); Carolina Panthers (2017); Orlando Apollos (2019); DC Defenders (2020)*
- * Offseason or practice squad member only

Career NFL statistics
- Total tackles: 54
- Forced fumbles: 2
- Pass deflections: 12
- Stats at Pro Football Reference

LaDarius Markeis Gunter Sr. (born May 13, 1992) is an American former professional football player who was a cornerback in the National Football League (NFL). He played college football for the Miami Hurricanes, and was signed by the Green Bay Packers as an undrafted free agent in 2015. Gunter also spent time in the NFL with the Carolina Panthers, the Orlando Apollos of the Alliance of American Football (AAF), and the DC Defenders of the XFL.

== Early life ==
Gunter attended Jefferson Davis High School in Montgomery, Alabama, participating in football and track and field. He played cornerback, safety, and outside linebacker for the Volunteers. Gunter also set personal records of 22.93 in the 200 and 1:03.45 in the 400 meters. However, he was unable to go to a top football program out of high school due to low test scores.

== College career ==
Gunter attended Fort Scott Community College for two years before transferring to the University of Miami. During his first year at Miami in 2012, Gunter played in 12 games with five starts. He recorded 27 tackles and one interception. As a junior in 2013, Gunter started all 13 games. He finished with 46 tackles and three interceptions. As a senior in 2014, he again started all 13 games and had 28 tackles and two interceptions.

== Professional career ==
External videos
- Gunter's NFL Combine workout

Pre-draft measurables
Height	Weight	Arm length	Hand span	40-yard dash	10-yard split	20-yard split	20-yard shuttle	Three-cone drill	Vertical jump	Broad jump	Bench press
6 ft 1 1/2 in (1.87 m)	202 lb (92 kg)	31 1/2 in (0.80 m)	9 5/8 in (0.24 m)	4.69 s	1.68 s	2.75 s	4.41 s	7.18 s	33.5 in (0.85 m)	9 ft 0 in (2.74 m)	12 reps
All values are from NFL Combine

=== Green Bay Packers ===
After going undrafted in the 2015 NFL draft, Gunter signed with the Green Bay Packers on May 8, 2015. He recorded eight tackles and an interception in the preseason, earning him a spot on the Packers' 53-man roster. Gunter made his NFL debut on September 28, 2015, against the Kansas City Chiefs.

On September 18, 2016, Gunter made his first NFL start, opening against the Minnesota Vikings in place of injured Sam Shields. He posted his first career forced fumble, but it was recovered by the Vikings. The Packers finished the season with a record of 10-6 and were the 2016 NFC North Champs. In the NFC Wild Card round against the New York Giants, Gunter was credited for containing Odell Beckham Jr to only four catches for 28 yards.

On September 12, 2017, Gunter was released by the Packers.

=== Carolina Panthers ===
On September 13, 2017, Gunter was claimed off waivers by the Carolina Panthers.

On March 26, 2018, Gunter re-signed with the Panthers. On August 31, 2018, Gunter was released.

=== Orlando Apollos ===
Gunter joined the Orlando Apollos of the Alliance of American Football for the team's inaugural spring 2019 season. The league ceased operations in April 2019.

=== DC Defenders ===
Gunter was selected in the 10th round during phase four in the 2020 XFL draft by the DC Defenders. He was released during mini-camp in December 2019.

=== NFL career statistics ===
Regular season

Year	Team	Games		Tackles					Interceptions						Fumbles	
Year	Team	GP	GS	Total	Solo	Ast	Sck	SFTY	PDef	Int	Yds	Avg	Lng	TDs	FF	FR
2015	GB	8	0	2	2	0	0.0	0	0	0	0	0.0	0	0	0	0
2016	GB	16	15	54	50	4	0.0	0	12	0	0	0.0	0	0	2	0
2017	GB	1	0	0	0	0	0.0	0	0	0	0	0.0	0	0	0	0
2017	CAR	4	0	0	0	0	0.0	0	0	0	0	0.0	0	0	0	0
Total		29	15	56	52	4	0.0	0	12	0	0	0.0	0	0	2	0
Source: NFL.com

Postseason

Year	Team	Games		Tackles					Interceptions						Fumbles	
Year	Team	GP	GS	Total	Solo	Ast	Sck	SFTY	PDef	Int	Yds	Avg	Lng	TDs	FF	FR
2015	GB	1	0	1	1	0	0.0	0	1	0	0	0.0	0	0	0	0
2016	GB	3	3	13	13	0	0.0	0	2	0	0	0.0	0	0	0	0
2017	CAR	1	0	1	1	0	0.0	0	0	0	0	0.0	0	0	0	0
Total		5	3	15	15	0	0.0	0	3	0	0	0.0	0	0	0	0
Source: pro-football-reference.com
