= Trevor Davis =

American football player (born 1993)

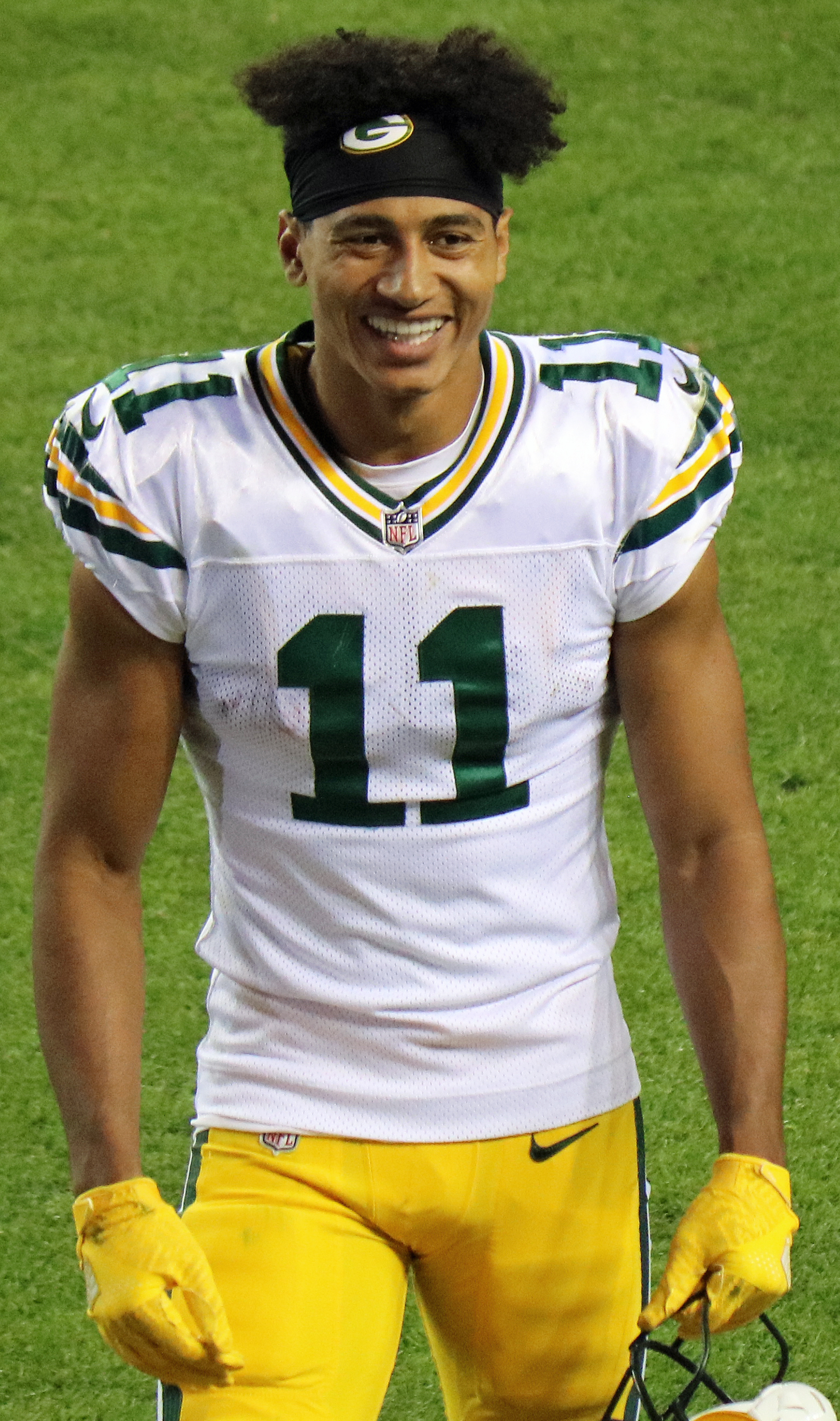
- Davis with the Green Bay Packers in 2017

No. 11, 89
- Position: Wide receiver

Personal information
- Born: July 4, 1993 (age 33); San Francisco, California, U.S.
- Listed height: 6 ft 1 in (1.85 m)
- Listed weight: 188 lb (85 kg)

Career information
- High school: Alhambra (Martinez, California)
- College: California
- NFL draft: 2016: 5th round, 163rd overall pick

Career history
- Green Bay Packers (2016–2019); Oakland Raiders (2019); Miami Dolphins (2019); Chicago Bears (2020)*; Washington Football Team (2020–2021)*; Atlanta Falcons (2021)*
- * Offseason or practice squad member only

Career NFL statistics
- Receptions: 16
- Receiving yards: 205
- Rushing yards: 86
- Return yards: 1,890
- Total touchdowns: 2
- Stats at Pro Football Reference

Trevor Lee Davis (born July 4, 1993) is an American former professional football player who was a wide receiver in the National Football League (NFL). He played college football for the California Golden Bears and was selected by the Green Bay Packers in the fifth round of the 2016 NFL draft. He was also a member of the Oakland Raiders, Miami Dolphins, Chicago Bears, Washington Football Team and Atlanta Falcons.

== Early life ==
Davis was born in San Francisco, California. He attended Alhambra High School in Martinez, California. The Bulldogs football team won a conference title with Davis totaling 27 catches for 504 yards with an 11–2 record in his junior year. As a senior, he recorded 43 catches for 876 yards and nine touchdowns.

Davis also participated in track and field competing in the long jump, triple jump and sprint events. He would go on to set school records in the 100 (10.72) and 200 (22.15) meters and the long jump (23’ 6").

In an interview with ESPN Wisconsin Radio in December 2016, Davis explained that his favorite NFL team growing up was the Philadelphia Eagles, due to the fact that Donovan McNabb was his second cousin. He also said that he was able to talk to McNabb when the Green Bay Packers played at Philadelphia during his rookie season.

A 2-star recruit, Davis committed to Hawaii to play college football over an offer from Idaho.

== College career ==
=== Hawaii (2011–2012) ===
In 2011, Davis started six games for the Rainbow Warriors. He made his first career start at Idaho on October 29, where he finished with four catches for 32 yards. Davis had a career-high seven catches for 81 yards and two touchdowns against Tulane and finished the season with six catches for a career-high 111 yards and one touchdown against BYU. He totaled 28 receptions for 336 yards and three touchdowns over his first year. As a sophomore, Davis had statistical drop where he would have 17 receptions for 235 yards and two touchdowns for the entire season. He ultimately decided to transfer from Hawaii after head coach Greg McMackin was replaced by Norm Chow.

=== California (2013–2015) ===
After his sophomore season, he transferred to the University of California, Berkeley, to play under head coach Sonny Dykes. With the Golden Bears, Davis was one of the main targets for 2016 number-one pick Jared Goff. In his final two seasons, he recorded 64 receptions for 971 yards and seven touchdowns. He also started returning kicks at California, returning two kicks for touchdowns in his junior year, leading the NCAA.

== Professional career ==
=== Pre-draft ===
Davis earned an invite to participate in the NFL Scouting Combine, although prior to the combine he was not considered to be on the minds of many NFL analysts.

External videos
- Davis' NFL Combine workout
- Davis gets drafted by Green Bay

Pre-draft measurables
Height	Weight	Arm length	Hand span	40-yard dash	10-yard split	20-yard split	20-yard shuttle	Three-cone drill	Vertical jump	Broad jump	Bench press	Wonderlic
6 ft 1 1/8 in (1.86 m)	188 lb (85 kg)	31 in (0.79 m)	10 in (0.25 m)	4.42 s	1.50 s	2.57 s	4.22 s	6.60 s	38.5 in (0.98 m)	10 ft 4 in (3.15 m)	11 reps	23
All values are from NFL Combine

Davis ranked in the top four out of all wide receivers at the 2016 NFL Scouting Combine in the 40-yard dash and vertical jump.

=== Green Bay Packers ===
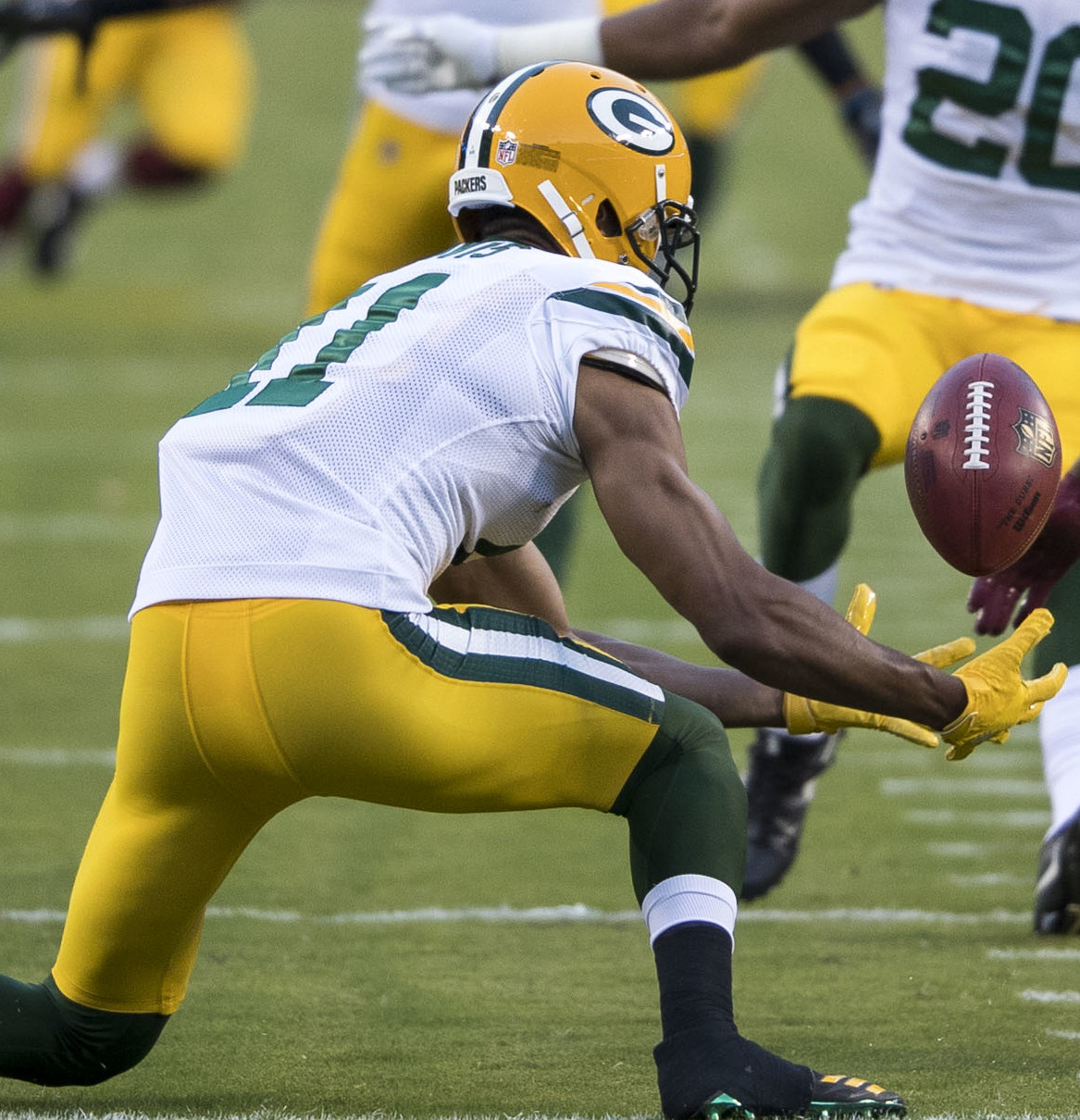
Davis with the Packers in 2017

Davis was selected in the fifth round (163rd overall) by the Green Bay Packers in the 2016 NFL draft. When asked about his speed the Packers director of football operations Eliot Wolf said, "That was one of the main attractions, definitely." On May 6, 2016, he signed a contract with the Packers. On Sept 25, 2016 Davis was fouled by Nevin Lawson of Detroit in what is believed to be the longest penalty in NFL history. Although the call was controversial, the pass interference penalty moved the ball 66 yards, more than Davis' total receiving yards that entire season. In Week 8 against the Atlanta Falcons, Davis caught his first professional pass on a six-yard pass from quarterback Aaron Rodgers. Later that game, he caught his first career touchdown on a nine-yard pass from Rodgers. He finished the game with three receptions for 24 yards, his total for the whole season.

On September 17, 2017, in a 34–23 loss to the Falcons in Week 2, Davis had a nine-yard reception, his first since Week 8 in 2016. In Week 14, Davis had five returns for 138 yards, including a 65-yard punt return which set up the game-tying score to force overtime against the Browns, in which the Packers won 27–21. This performance earned him NFC Special Teams Player of the Week.

On September 11, 2018, Davis was placed on injured reserve with a hamstring injury. On November 7, the Packers designated Davis to return from injured reserve. He was officially activated on November 15, prior to the team's Week 11 game. Davis was placed back on injured reserve on December 1, after suffering another hamstring injury in Week 12.

=== Oakland Raiders ===
On September 18, 2019, Davis was traded to the Oakland Raiders for a 2020 sixth-round pick. Davis made his debut with the Raiders in Week 4 against the Indianapolis Colts. In the game, Davis rushed two times for 74 yards including a 60-yard touchdown in the 31–24 win. On December 2, Davis was waived by the Raiders.

=== Miami Dolphins ===
On December 3, 2019, Davis was claimed off waivers by the Miami Dolphins.

=== Chicago Bears ===
On April 29, 2020, Davis signed with the Chicago Bears on a one-year contract, but was released by the team on August 25.

=== Washington Football Team ===
Davis signed to the practice squad of the Washington Football Team on October 28, 2020. On January 11, 2021, Davis signed a reserve/futures contract with Washington. Following the 2021 NFL draft, Davis was released by the Football Team on May 3.

=== Atlanta Falcons ===
On August 5, 2021, Davis signed with the Atlanta Falcons. He was released by the Falcons on August 31.

== Career statistics ==
=== NFL ===
Regular season statistics
Year	Team	GP	GS	Receiving					Fumbles	
Year	Team	GP	GS	Rec	Yds	Avg	Lng	TD	FUM	Lost
2016	GB	11	0	3	24	8.0	9	1	2	1
2017	GB	16	0	5	70	14.0	29	0	0	0
2018	GB	2	0	0	0	0	0	0	0	0
2019	GB	2	0	1	28	28.0	28	0	0	0
2019	OAK	9	4	7	83	11.9	21	0	2	2
Total		40	4	16	205	12.8	29	1	4	3

=== College ===
Year	School	Games	Rec	Yds	Avg	TD
2011	Hawaii	7	28	366	13.1	3
2012	Hawaii	8	17	235	13.8	2
2013	California	NCAA transfer sit-out				
2014	California	9	24	399	16.6	5
2015	California	13	40	672	16.8	2
Career		37	109	1,672	15.3	12

== Personal life ==
On April 8, 2018, Davis was arrested after making a joke at the Hawaiian Airlines counter at Los Angeles International Airport about packing an explosive. He was arrested on charges of making a criminal threat but was released after posting bail of $15,000.
