= Mason Crosby =

American football player (born 1984)

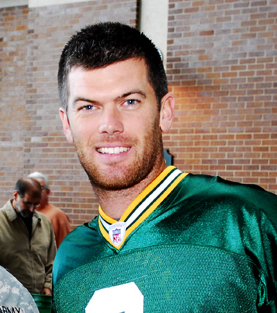
- Crosby with the Green Bay Packers in 2010

No. 2, 21
- Position: Placekicker

Personal information
- Born: September 3, 1984 (age 42); Lubbock, Texas, U.S.
- Listed height: 6 ft 1 in (1.85 m)
- Listed weight: 207 lb (94 kg)

Career information
- High school: Georgetown (Georgetown, Texas)
- College: Colorado (2003–2006)
- NFL draft: 2007: 6th round, 193rd overall pick

Career history
- Green Bay Packers (2007–2022); Los Angeles Rams (2023)*; New York Giants (2023)
- * Offseason or practice squad member only

Awards and highlights
- Super Bowl champion (XLV); NFL scoring leader (2007); Big 12 Special Teams Player of the Year (2005); 2× First-team All-American (2005, 2006); 3× First-team All-Big 12 (2004–2006); NFL record: Most consecutive post-season field goals: 23; Most consecutive starts by a kicker: 258

Career NFL statistics
- Field goals: 400
- Field goal attempts: 492
- Field goal %: 81.3
- Longest field goal: 58
- Touchbacks: 508
- Stats at Pro Football Reference

Mason Walker Crosby (born September 3, 1984) is an American former professional football player who was a placekicker in the National Football League (NFL). He played college football for the Colorado Buffaloes, and earned unanimous All-American honors. The Green Bay Packers selected him in the sixth round of the 2007 NFL draft.

Crosby spent 16 seasons with the Packers, where he was a member of the team's Super Bowl XLV championship team. Crosby also briefly played for the New York Giants, before officially retiring from the NFL in 2025. He finished his career as the Packers' all-time leader across all kicking and scoring categories, as well as games played.

== Early life ==
Crosby attended and played high school football at Georgetown High School.

== College career ==
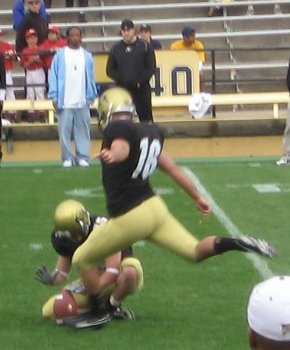
Crosby kicking a field goal in the 2006 Colorado spring game

Crosby attended the University of Colorado Boulder, where he played on the Colorado Buffaloes football team from 2003 to 2006. While enrolled at Colorado, he displayed extraordinary leg strength, making a school-record 60-yard field goal against Iowa State in 2004. Crosby's 58-yard field goal against Miami in 2005 was the longest ever kicked in NCAA Division I-A football at sea-level without a tee. In all, Crosby holds 31 school records. Crosby connected on 66 of 88 field goals in total during his college career, and 30 of 34 inside 40 yards.

He developed a reputation for kicking in the clutch, making 12 of 13 field goals in the fourth quarter, and a perfect 10/10 in the final 8 1/2 minutes of games. This bent was most evident when Crosby played rival Colorado State University, against which Crosby made kicks of 55 (2004), 48, and 47 yards (2005) in consecutive years to win the Rocky Mountain Showdown.

Crosby also served as the Buffaloes' kickoff specialist, where his knack for forcing touchbacks after touchdowns made him a fan favorite. Overall, 138 of Crosby's 203 career kickoffs were touchbacks, including an 87-yard kickoff touchback from the 20-yard line against Iowa State in 2004. The Sporting News named Crosby to its All-Decade team for the first nine years of the 2000s (decade).

Crosby was a first-team All-Big 12 selection in 2004, 2005, and 2006. Following his junior season in 2005, he was recognized as a unanimous first-team All-American, having received first-team honors from the Associated Press, the Football Writers Association of America, The Sporting News, and Walter Camp Football Foundation. As a senior, he was again selected as a first-team All-American by Pro Football Weekly and the Walter Camp Football Foundation. He was the runner-up for the Lou Groza Award, despite being heavily favored to win. During his senior season, he became the first player in Big 12 Conference history to be named player of the week eight times, and became Colorado's all-time leading scorer, with 308 career points.

== Professional career ==
Pre-draft measurables
Height	Weight	Arm length	Hand span	40-yard dash
6 ft 1 1/4 in (1.86 m)	212 lb (96 kg)	29 1/2 in (0.75 m)	9 1/4 in (0.23 m)	5.18 s
All values from NFL Combine

Crosby kicking a field goal in his rookie season

=== Green Bay Packers ===
==== 2007 season ====
Crosby was selected by the Green Bay Packers in the sixth round (193rd overall) of the 2007 NFL draft, the last of three consecutive picks for the Packers, and the third kicker overall. Crosby entered training camp in a battle with incumbent placekicker Dave Rayner. During Green Bay's first pre-season game against the Pittsburgh Steelers, Crosby kicked a 52-yard field goal, the longest field goal in the history of Heinz Field. Crosby won the starting job during the final roster cut.

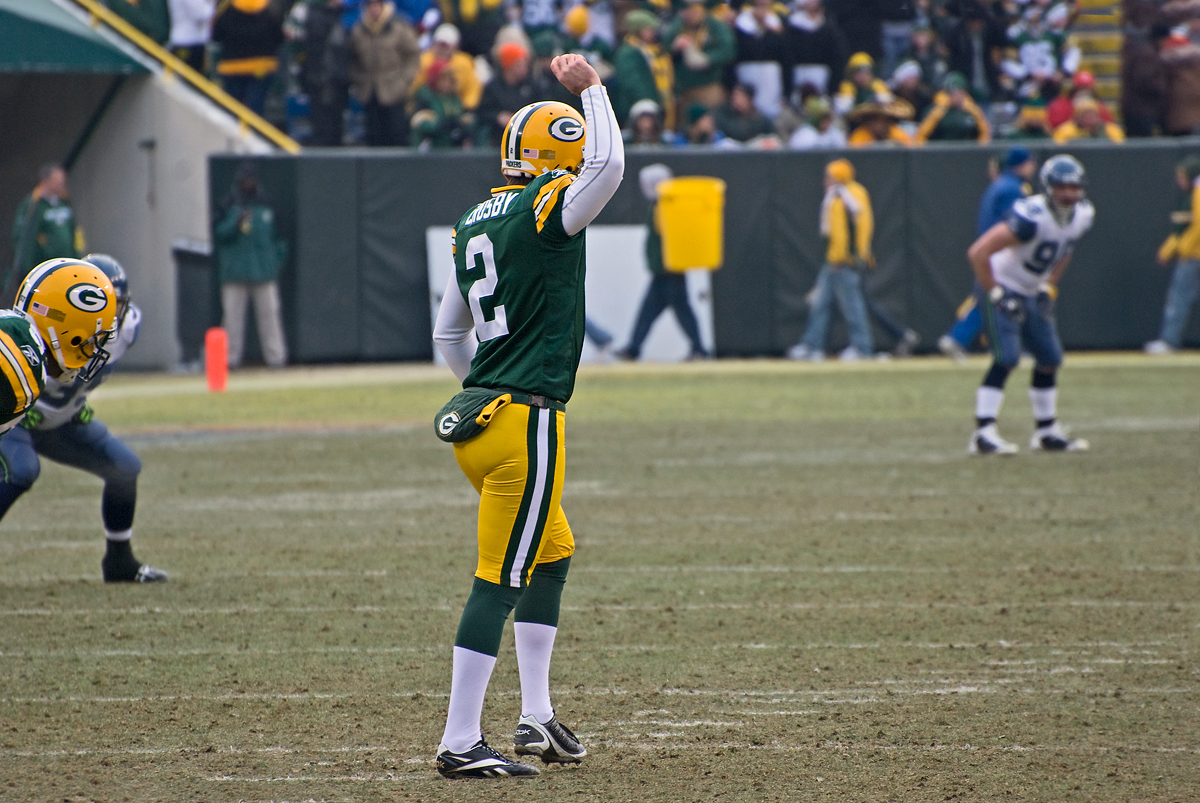
Crosby preparing to kickoff in 2009

In his first regular season game, Crosby converted all three field goals he attempted, including a 53-yarder and a 42-yard kick with two seconds left on the clock to help the Packers defeat the visiting Philadelphia Eagles 16–13. The kick was the first game-winner by a rookie on opening weekend since 1979 (when Matt Bahr achieved the same feat). Crosby was the first player in NFL history to kick a 50-yard field goal and a game-winning field goal with under a minute remaining in his NFL debut. Crosby was named NFC Special Teams Player of the Week (the first rookie kicker to receive this honor on opening weekend).

Crosby was awarded the NFC Special Teams Player of the Month for November 2007. He led all NFL kickers with 54 points and tied for the lead with 12 field goals as the Packers posted a 4–1 mark. Crosby converted 12 of 15 field goals during November and was a perfect 18-for-18 on PATs. He had at least one field goal in every game, including four in the Week 9 win at the Kansas City Chiefs. His longest field goal of the month was a 52-yarder in the Week 13 contest at the Dallas Cowboys. For the 2007 season, Crosby led the NFL with 130 points scored and his 24 field goals ranked first in the NFC. Crosby finished second for most points scored in a season by a rookie (Kevin Butler had 144 points for Chicago in 1985). Crosby finished 2007 with the highest-scoring season by a kicker in franchise history and third-highest season point total by any Packers player.

==== 2008 season ====
In the 2008 season, Crosby converted all 46 extra point attempts and 27 of 34 field goal attempts as the Packers went 6–10. He led the league in extra points attempted and converted.

==== 2009 season ====
Crosby converted 48 of 49 extra point attempts and 27 of 36 field goal attempts in the 2009 season as the Packers went 11–5.

==== 2010 season ====
In the first game of the 2010 regular season against the Eagles, Crosby kicked a field goal from 56 yards in the last seconds of the first half, his then career long and a franchise record. On the day, he converted all three extra point tries and both field goal attempts in the 27–20 victory. He earned NFC Special Teams Player of the Week for his game against Philadelphia. On the 2010 season, Crosby converted all 46 extra point attempts and 22 of 28 field goal attempts.

At the end of the 2010 season, Crosby and the Packers appeared in Super Bowl XLV against the Steelers. In the 31–25 victory, he converted all four extra point attempts and his only field goal attempt. In the 2010 postseason, Crosby converted all 16 extra point attempts.

==== 2011 season ====
On July 27, 2011, the Packers re-signed Crosby to a 5-year, $14 million deal. In Week 4, Crosby kicked a season-high seven PATs against the Denver Broncos. In Week 5, he equaled his then record distance on a 56-yard field goal on October 9, 2011, in the third quarter against the Atlanta Falcons. In Week 7, Crosby set the franchise record when he made a 58-yard field goal in the third quarter as part of a four-field-goal game. Crosby earned NFC Special Teams Player of the Week honors for Weeks 5 and 7. For the month of October, Crosby won NFC Special Teams Player of the Month. Crosby kicked four field goals in a game on three occasions, which were Week 5 (Falcons), Week 7 (Minnesota Vikings), and Week 14 (Oakland Raiders). He finished the 2011 season converting 68-of-69 extra point attempts and 24-of 28 field goal attempts. He led the league in extra points attempted and converted. The Packers' season ended in the Divisional Round against the New York Giants. In the 37–20 loss, he converted both extra point attempts and both field goal attempts.

==== 2012 season ====
In Week 2, Crosby kicked a season-long 54-yard field goal against the Chicago Bears. In Week 16, Crosby kicked a season-high seven PATs against the Tennessee Titans.

In 2012, he finished with a 63.6 field-goal percentage. This was the lowest field goal percentage for any active kicker in the league in the 2012 season. Overall, he converted all 50 extra point attempts and 21 of 33 field goal attempts in the 2012 season.

==== 2013 season ====
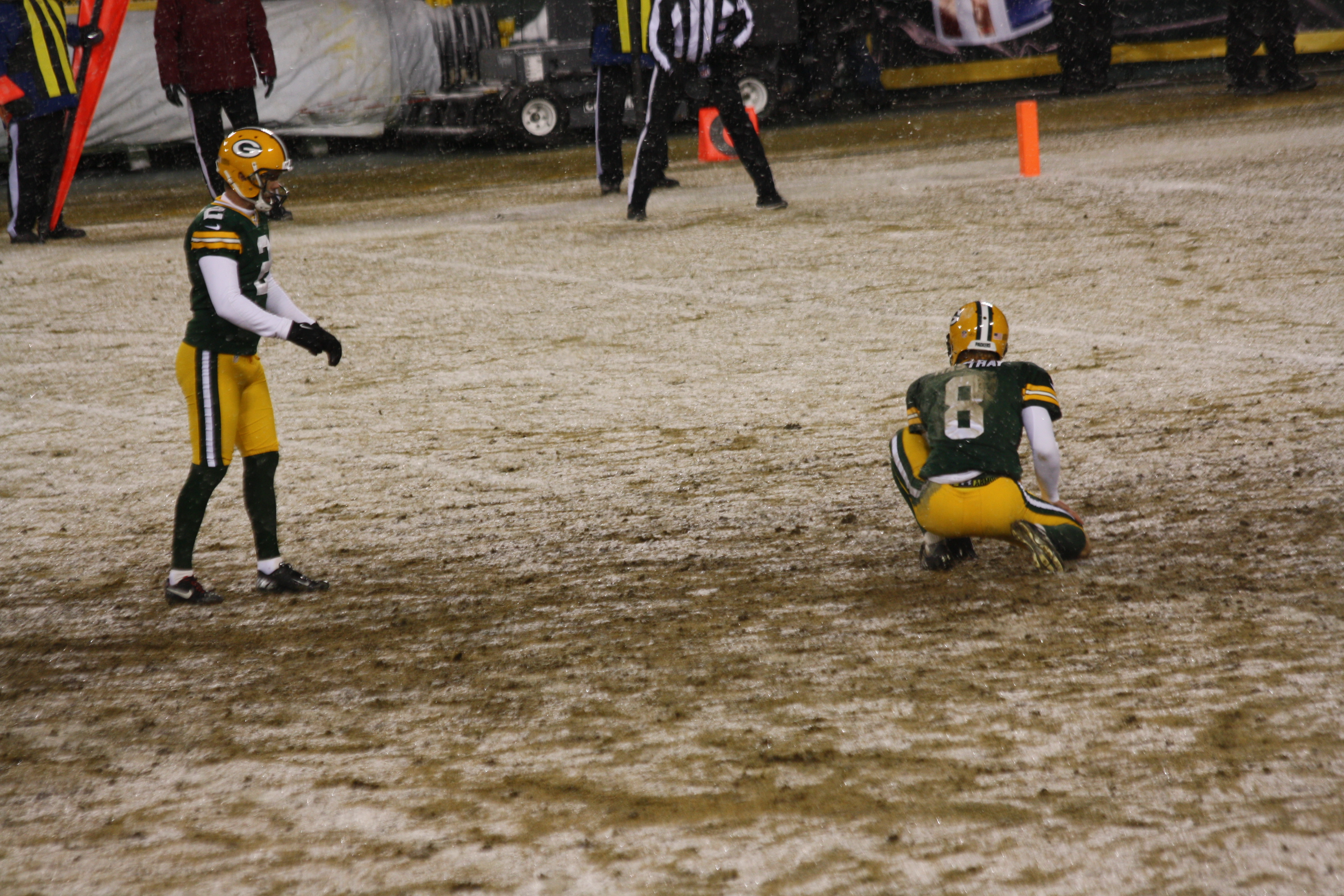
Crosby preparing to kick a field goal in 2013

In Week 2, Crosby kicked a season-high five PATs against the Washington Redskins. In Week 5, Crosby kicked a season-high five field goals against the Detroit Lions. Crosby earned NFC Special Teams Player of the Week for his Week 6 game against the Baltimore Ravens. He converted four of five field goal attempts and one extra point in the 17–9 victory. In Week 8, Crosby tied his season-high five PATs against the Vikings as well. In Week 11, Crosby kicked a season-long 57-yard field goal against the Giants. In Week 15, Crosby tied his season-long 57-yard field goal against the Cowboys. Crosby converted all 42 extra point attempts and added 33 field goals in the 2013 season, tying the franchise single-season record with Ryan Longwell and Chester Marcol.

==== 2014 season ====
In Week 2, Crosby kicked a season-long 55-yard field goal against the New York Jets in the 31–24 victory. In Week 10, Crosby kicked a season-high seven PATs against the Bears in the 55–14 victory. Crosby scored his 1,000th point in his 124th career game, the Packers' Week 13 game against the New England Patriots, making him the third-fastest player to 1,000 points (after the Patriots' Stephen Gostkowski and Gino Cappelletti). In the 2014 season, Crosby converted 53 of 55 extra point attempts of 27 of 33 field goal attempts.

On January 18, 2015, in the NFC Championship, Crosby kicked a season-high five field goals against the Seattle Seahawks, including a 48-yarder to force overtime. However, Seattle scored a touchdown which ended the Packers season.

==== 2015 season ====
In Week 2, Crosby broke Ryan Longwell's team career scoring record of 1,054 with his fourth field goal of the game against the Seahawks. He became the all-time leading scorer in Packers' history. In Week 3, Crosby kicked a season-high five PATs against the Chiefs. In Week 8, Crosby kicked a season-long 56-yard field goal against the Broncos. In Week 11, Crosby kicked a season-high five field goals against the Vikings. For his game against the Vikings, he earned NFC Special Teams Player of the Week for Week 11. On January 3, 2016, Crosby recorded a forced fumble against the Vikings. He finished the 2015 season converting all 36 extra point attempts and 24 of 28 field goal attempts.

==== 2016 season ====
On March 1, 2016, Crosby signed a four-year contract extension with the Packers. In the 2016 season, Crosby converted 44 of 47 extra point attempts and 26 of 30 field goal attempts.

On January 15, 2017, Crosby kicked two field goals, from 56 and 51 yards, in the final two minutes of the Packers' 34–31-second-round NFC Divisional Round against the Cowboys. Crosby kicked the 51-yard attempt for the win as time expired, marking the first time a kicker made two 50+ yard field goals in the final two minutes of a postseason game. Prior to the game-winning kick, the Cowboys called a timeout just before Crosby had a chance to kick the 51-yarder initially. He made that "practice" kick as well. He also converted his 20th consecutive field goal in the postseason, surpassing David Akers's previous record of 19.

==== 2017 season ====
Crosby completed the 2017 season with the Packers, maintaining a 78.9% field goal completion percentage, his lowest since 2012. Crosby also accomplished a 94.3% extra point completion percentage, the second lowest of his career. The Packers had been suffering difficulties with the longsnapper position and holder responsibilities changed hands several times throughout the year. The search for a longsnapper and reliable holder led to several missed field goals and two missed extra points.

During a Week 10 matchup against the Chicago Bears, Crosby missed a 35-yard field goal off of an off-line snap that was then mishandled by rookie holder and punter Justin Vogel. After that game, Crosby only missed one more kick for the rest of the season, a would-be record at Heinz Field of 57 yards.

Due to the Packers' loss of Aaron Rodgers for most of the season, defensive difficulties, and special teams miscues, 2017 would be only the second year Crosby had not played in a playoff game in his 10-year NFL career. He finished the 2017 season converting 33 of 35 extra point attempts and 15 of 19 field goal attempts.

==== 2018 season ====
In a Week 2 tie against the Vikings, Crosby made what appeared to be the game-winning field goal at the end of regulation. However, the Vikings called a timeout just before the attempt to "ice the kicker", and Crosby missed the second attempt sending the game into overtime and an eventual tie. In Week 5, Crosby was 1–5 on field goals and also missed his only extra point attempt, becoming the first player since Kris Brown in 2001 to miss four field goals in a single game and just the fourth player in NFL history to miss at least four field goals and an extra point in a game. Crosby bounced back the following week, converting all three extra point attempts and all four field goal attempts, including a 27-yard game winner as time expired in a 33–30 win over the San Francisco 49ers, earning him NFC Special Teams Player of the Week. He finished the 2018 season converting 34 of 36 extra point attempts and 30 of 37 field goal attempts.

==== 2019 season ====
In Week 6, Crosby kicked three field goals, including the game-winner, in a Week 6 victory over the Lions; he performed a Lambeau Leap to celebrate the victory. He kicked another game-winning field goal during a Week 17 rematch against the Lions on December 29. He finished the 2019 season converting 40 of 41 extra point attempts and 22 of 24 field goal attempts.

==== 2020 season ====
On February 24, 2020, Crosby signed a three-year, $12.9 million contract extension with the Packers. On July 30, the Packers placed Crosby on the reserve/COVID-19 list. He was activated on August 15, 2020. Crosby had a perfect regular season on field goal attempts for the first time in his career, making 16 of 16 field goals. Crosby and the Seahawks' Jason Myers both recorded a perfect season in 2020. They became the 8th and 9th players in NFL history to qualify as players to earn a perfect season kicking field goals. The 16 field goals he attempted were a career low, as the Packers offense had a record-setting year—Crosby had fewer field goals than wide receiver Davante Adams had touchdowns (18). Crosby led the league with 59 extra points converted on 63 attempts.

==== 2021 season ====
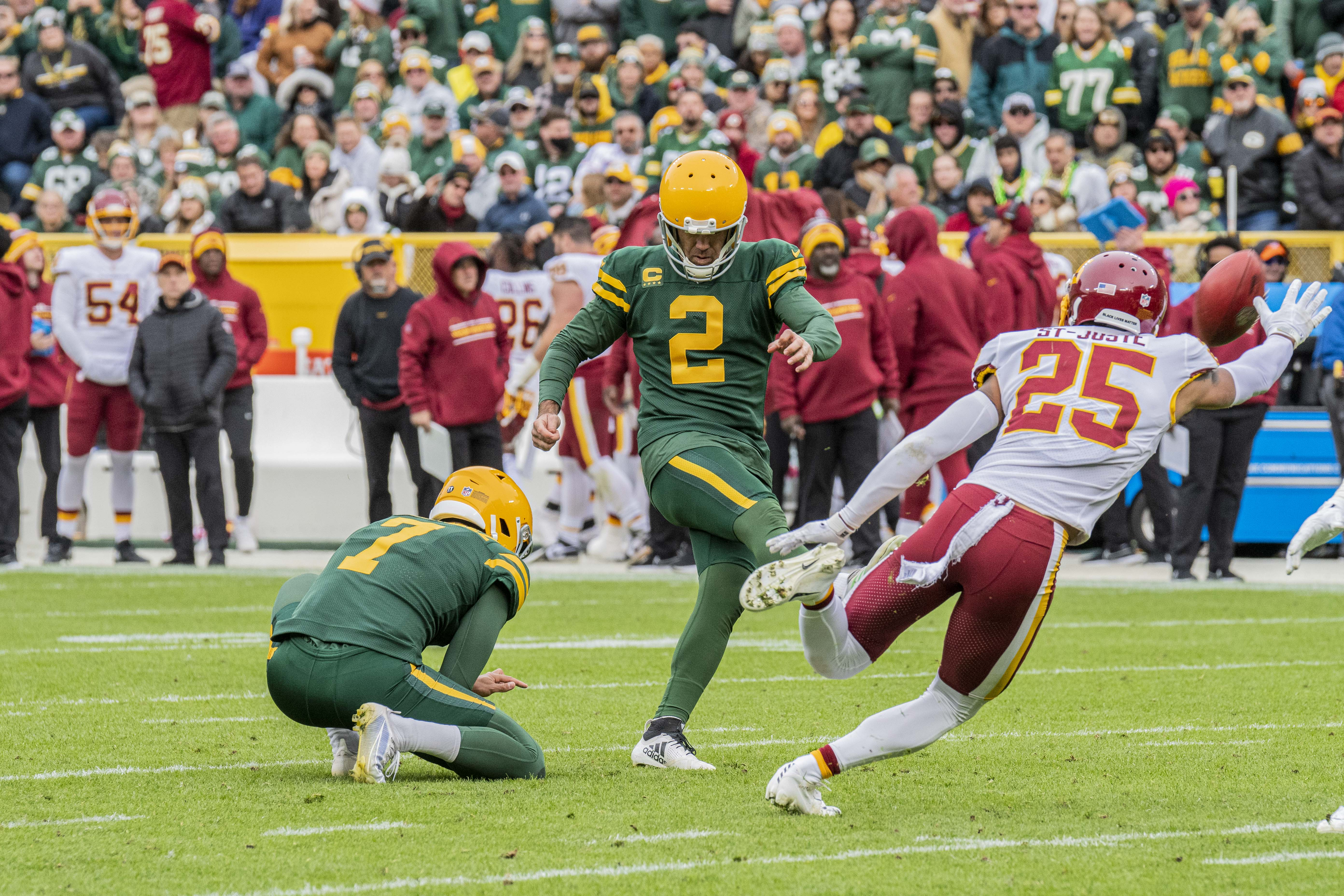
Crosby playing for the Packers in 2021.

On March 23, 2021, Packers restructured Crosby's contract by converting part of his base salary into a salary bonus, as well as his $1.25M roster bonus to a signing bonus. Part of this restructure was also included extending his contract with three void years. In a Week 3 win against the 49ers, Crosby made all three of his field goal attempts, including the 51-yard game-winner as time expired, earning NFC Special Teams Player of the Week. Against the Cincinnati Bengals, Crosby missed three straight field goals that could've won the game for the Packers, but ended up making a game winning field goal in overtime to help the Packers win 25–22. In what had been an up and down year, the special teams unit was ranked dead last in efficiency by DVOA. This in part was due to the myriad of miscues and miss-kicks. Crosby finished the 2021 season converting 49 of 51 extra point attempts and 25 of 34 field goal attempts.

In the Divisional Round against the 49ers, Crosby had a kick blocked by Jimmie Ward at the end of the first half. This blocked kick would come back to haunt the Packers as they went on to lose by a score of 13–10.

==== 2022 season: Final year in Green Bay ====
Crosby converted game-winning field goals in overtime games against the Patriots in Week 4 and the Cowboys in Week 10. In the 2022 season, Crosby converted 37 of 39 extra point attempts and 25 of 29 field goal attempts as the Packers finished 8–9 and missed the playoffs.

=== Los Angeles Rams ===
On December 6, 2023, the Los Angeles Rams signed Crosby to their practice squad. He was released on December 12.

=== New York Giants ===
On December 22, 2023, Crosby was signed to the Giants practice squad following an injury to kicker Cade York. He appeared in three games for the Giants. His contract expired when the team's season ended on January 7, 2024.

=== Retirement ===
On February 4, 2025, Crosby announced his official retirement from the NFL on his podcast "Kickin' It with the Crosby's." On March 5, the Packers announced they were signing Crosby to a one-day contract to be retired as a Packer.

== Career statistics ==
=== NFL ===
Legend
	Won the Super Bowl
	Led the league
**Bold**	Career high

==== Regular season ====
Year	Team	GP	Field goals									Extra points			Total points
Year	Team	GP	FGM	FGA	FG%	<20	20−29	30−39	40−49	50+	Lng	XPM	XPA	XP%	Total points
2007	GB	16	31	**39**	79.5	**1–1**	8–8	10–11	9–14	3–5	53	48	48	**100.0**	**141**
2008	GB	16	27	34	79.4	**1–1**	8–8	10–13	5–6	3–6	53	46	46	**100.0**	127
2009	GB	16	27	36	75.0	**1–1**	**13–13**	7–9	4–7	2–6	52	48	49	98.0	129
2010	GB	16	22	28	78.6	**1–1**	7–8	4–5	8–10	2–4	56	46	46	**100.0**	112
2011	GB	16	24	28	85.7	**1–1**	4–5	**14–14**	3–5	2–3	**58**	**68**	**69**	98.6	140
2012	GB	16	21	33	63.6	0–0	5–5	5–7	9–12	2–9	54	50	50	**100.0**	113
2013	GB	16	**33**	37	89.2	**1–1**	**13–13**	8–8	6–8	**5–7**	57	42	42	**100.0**	**141**
2014	GB	16	27	33	81.8	0–0	7–7	10–11	6–8	4–7	55	53	55	96.4	134
2015	GB	16	24	28	85.7	**1–1**	7–7	4–4	8–11	4–5	56	36	36	**100.0**	108
2016	GB	16	26	30	86.7	**1–1**	6–6	12–14	6–7	1–2	53	44	47	93.6	122
2017	GB	16	15	19	78.9	0–0	8–8	2–4	4–4	1–3	50	33	35	94.3	78
2018	GB	16	30	37	81.1	0–0	4–4	10–11	**11–15**	**5–7**	53	34	36	94.4	124
2019	GB	16	22	24	91.7	**1–1**	2–2	11–11	7–8	1–2	54	40	41	97.6	106
2020	GB	16	16	16	**100.0**	**1–1**	1–1	5–5	5–5	4–4	57	59	63	93.7	107
2021	GB	**17**	25	34	73.5	0–0	9–9	9–13	4–8	3–4	54	49	51	96.1	124
2022	GB	**17**	25	29	86.2	0–0	10–10	8–8	6–7	1–4	56	37	39	94.9	112
2023	NYG	3	5	7	71.4	0–0	2–2	2–2	0–1	1–2	52	6	7	85.7	21
Total		261	400	492	81.3	10–10	114–116	131–150	101–136	44–80	58	739	760	97.2	1,939

==== Postseason ====
Year	Team	GP	Field goals									Extra points			Total points
Year	Team	GP	FGM	FGA	FG%	<20	20−29	30−39	40−49	50+	Lng	XPM	XPA	XP%	Total points
2007	GB	2	2	2	**100.0**	0–0	0–0	**2–2**	0–0	0–0	37	8	8	100.0	14
2009	GB	1	1	2	50.0	0–0	1–1	0–0	0–0	0–1	20	6	6	100.0	9
2010	GB	**4**	3	4	75.0	0–0	1–1	1–1	1–1	0–1	43	**16**	**16**	100.0	**25**
2011	GB	1	2	2	**100.0**	0–0	0–0	1–1	1–1	0–0	47	2	2	100.0	8
2012	GB	2	2	2	**100.0**	0–0	1–1	1–1	0–0	0–0	31	7	7	100.0	13
2013	GB	1	2	2	**100.0**	0–0	1–1	1–1	0–0	0–0	34	2	2	100.0	8
2014	GB	2	**7**	**7**	**100.0**	**2–2**	0–0	1–1	**4–4**	0–0	48	3	3	100.0	24
2015	GB	2	4	4	**100.0**	0–0	2–2	1–1	1–1	0–0	43	5	5	100.0	17
2016	GB	3	3	4	75.0	0–0	0–0	1–1	0–1	**2–2**	**56**	10	10	100.0	19
2019	GB	2	0	0	–	0–0	0–0	0–0	0–0	0–0	–	6	6	100.0	6
2020	GB	2	4	4	**100.0**	0–0	**3–3**	1–1	0–0	0–0	39	4	4	100.0	16
2021	GB	1	1	2	50.0	0–0	0–0	1–2	0–0	0–0	33	1	1	100.0	4
Total		23	31	35	88.6	2–2	9–9	11–12	7–8	2–4	56	70	70	100.0	163

=== College ===
Year	Team	GP	Field goals				PAT			Kickoffs			
Year	Team	GP	FGA	FGM	Pct	Lng	XPA	XPM	Pct	KO	OOB	TB	Ret
2003	Colorado	12	9	7	77.8	44	37	31	83.8	37	1	26	10
2004	Colorado	13	23	19	82.6	60	30	28	93.3	59	0	41	17
2005	Colorado	13	28	21	75.0	58	31	31	100.0	61	0	43	18
2006	Colorado	12	28	19	67.9	56	19	19	100.0	46	1	28	17
Total		50	88	66	75.0	60	117	109	93.2	203	2	138	62
Source: sports-reference.com

== Career highlights ==
NFL

- Super Bowl champion (XLV)
- NFL scoring leader (2007)
- 2× NFC Special Teams Player of the Month (November 2007 & October 2013)
- 8× NFC Special Teams Player of the Week
- Green Bay Packers all-time leading scorer
- NFL record most consecutive post-season field goals: 23
- NFL record most consecutive starts by a kicker: 258

College

- Big 12 Special Teams Player of the Year (2005)
- 2× First-team All-American (2005, 2006)
- 3× First-team All-Big 12 (2004–2006)

== Personal life ==
Crosby graduated in December 2006 from the University of Colorado, majoring in communication. He attended Georgetown High School in Texas, where he played football and soccer. He is a Houston Astros and Liverpool F.C. fan and an avid golfer. Mason's father, Jim, was a running back in college for the UTEP Miners and graduated from Texas Tech. Crosby married Molly (née Ackerman) on June 28, 2008. They have five children.

Crosby is a Christian, who has spoken about his faith by saying, "I think He helps me knowing that kicking is what I do, not who I am. It's not everything that I am. I can escape knowing that my relationship with Christ is what carries me. I'm always reading in the Proverbs and Psalms to relax my mind before we play. I know that God cares for me all the time regardless of any outcome here."

Crosby is a supporter of Compassion International and their "Fill the Stadium" initiative.
