= Lane Taylor =

American football player (born 1989)

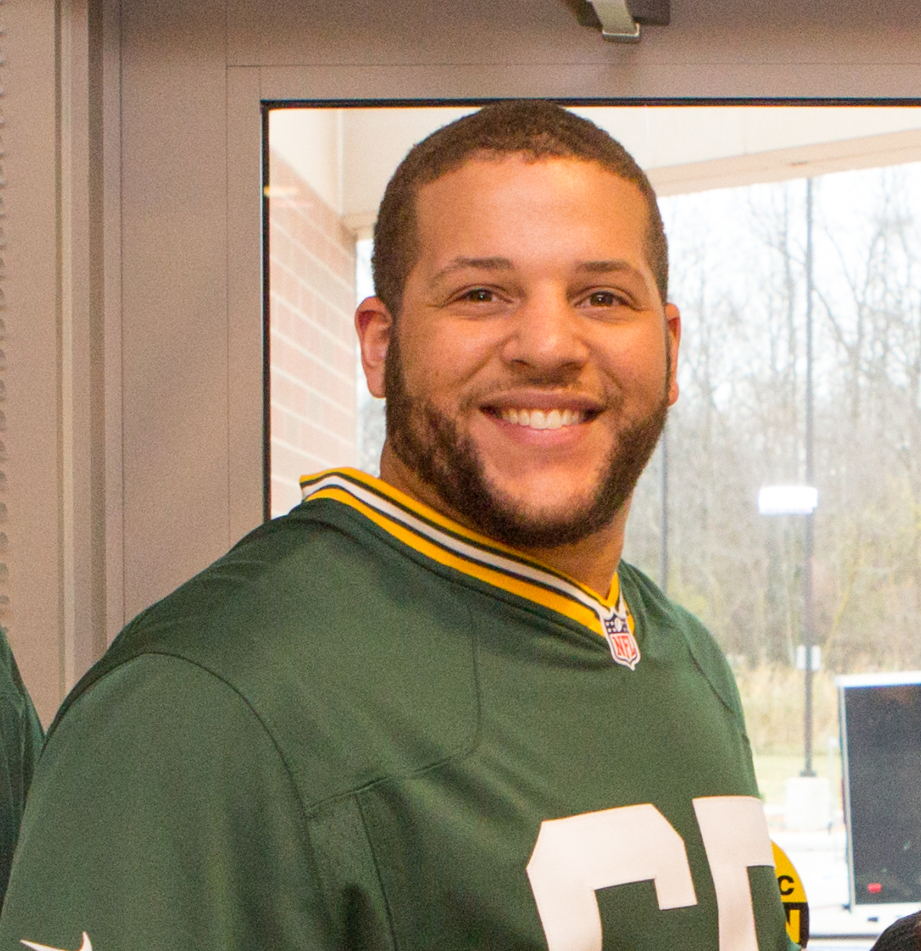
- Taylor with the Green Bay Packers in 2016

No. 65
- Position: Guard

Personal information
- Born: November 22, 1989 (age 36); Arlington, Texas, U.S.
- Listed height: 6 ft 3 in (1.91 m)
- Listed weight: 324 lb (147 kg)

Career information
- High school: Martin (Arlington)
- College: Oklahoma State
- NFL draft: 2013: undrafted

Career history
- Green Bay Packers (2013–2020); Houston Texans (2021)

Awards and highlights
- Second-team All-American (2012); First-team All-Big 12 (2012)

Career NFL statistics
- Games played: 87
- Games started: 55
- Stats at Pro Football Reference

Lane Dominick Taylor (born November 22, 1989) is an American former professional football player who was a guard in the National Football League (NFL). He played college football for the Oklahoma State Cowboys. Taylor was signed by the Green Bay Packers as an undrafted free agent in 2013.

== Professional career ==
Pre-draft measurables
Height	Weight	40-yard dash	10-yard split	20-yard split	20-yard shuttle	Three-cone drill	Vertical jump	Broad jump	Bench press
6 ft 3 in (1.91 m)	324 lb (147 kg)	5.35 s	1.88 s	3.07 s	4.72 s	8.41 s	24.5 in (0.62 m)	8 ft 0 in (2.44 m)	31 reps
All values are from Pro Day

=== Green Bay Packers ===
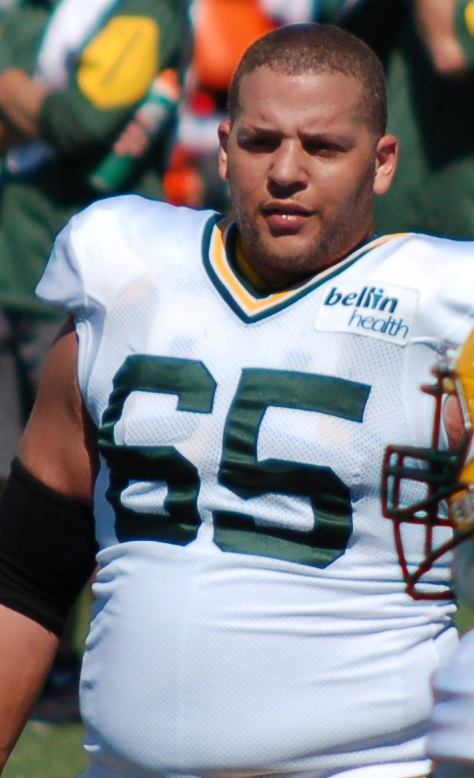
Taylor at training camp in 2015

After going undrafted in the 2013 NFL draft, Taylor signed with the Green Bay Packers on May 10, 2013. In his rookie season, he appeared in ten games, playing predominantly on special teams.

Taylor appeared in all 16 games in his second season in 2014, playing at left and right guard.

In his third season in 2015, Taylor started the first NFL game of his career against the Detroit Lions in Week 13 at right guard. He started his second game against the Minnesota Vikings at left guard in Week 17. ESPN staff writer Rob Demovsky cited that Taylor performed "nearly flawlessly" in both games.

On March 8, 2016, Taylor signed a two-year, $4.15 million contract with the Packers.

On September 4, 2017, Taylor signed a three-year, $16.5 million contract extension with the Packers after starting all 16 games for the first time in 2016.

On September 21, 2019, Taylor was placed on injured reserve with a biceps injury.

Taylor entered the 2020 season as the Packers starting right guard. He suffered a season-ending knee injury in Week 1. On September 22, Taylor was placed on injured reserve.

=== Houston Texans ===
On April 16, 2021, Taylor signed with Houston Texans to a one-year contract. He was released on August 31, and re-signed to the practice squad. He was promoted to the active roster on November 27.
