= Makinton Dorleant =

American football player (born 1992)

No. 20, 43, 33, 35
- Position: Cornerback

Personal information
- Born: October 6, 1992 (age 34); Naples, Florida, U.S.
- Listed height: 5 ft 11 in (1.80 m)
- Listed weight: 182 lb (83 kg)

Career information
- High school: Lely (Naples)
- College: Northern Iowa
- NFL draft: 2016: undrafted

Career history
- Green Bay Packers (2016); Kansas City Chiefs (2018)*; Baltimore Ravens (2018)*; Oakland Raiders (2018–2019); Winnipeg Blue Bombers (2020)*
- * Offseason or practice squad member only

Career NFL statistics
- Total tackles: 1
- Stats at Pro Football Reference

Makinton Dorleant (born October 6, 1992) is an American former professional football player who was a cornerback in the National Football League (NFL) and Canadian Football League (CFL). He played college football for the Northern Iowa Panthers. Dorleant was signed by the Green Bay Packers as an undrafted free agent in 2016.

== College career ==
Dorleant attended the University of Northern Iowa, where he played for coach Mark Farley's Northern Iowa Panthers football team from 2013 to 2015 after transferring from the University of Maryland.

=== Statistics ===
Year	Team	G	Tackles					Interceptions						Fumbles	
Year	Team	G	Total	Solo	Ast	Sck	SFTY	PDef	Int	Yds	Avg	Lng	TDs	FF	FR
2012	UMD	12	4	2	2	0.0	0	0	0	0	0.0	0	0	0	0
2013	UNI	12	54	34	20	0.0	0	4	1	0	0.0	0	0	1	0
2014	UNI	14	37	30	7	0.0	0	7	0	0	0.0	0	0	2	0
2015	UNI	14	47	40	7	0.0	0	17	1	17	17.0	17	0	3	2
Total		52	142	106	36	0.0	0	28	2	17	8.5	17	0	6	2
Source: UNIPanthers.com

== Professional career ==
Pre-draft measurables
Height	Weight	40-yard dash	10-yard split	20-yard split	20-yard shuttle	Three-cone drill	Vertical jump	Broad jump	Bench press	Wonderlic
5 ft 11 in (1.80 m)	178 lb (81 kg)	4.40 s	1.53 s	2.53 s	4.45 s	7.03 s	39 in (0.99 m)	10 ft 3 in (3.12 m)	16 reps	12
All values are from Pro Day

=== Green Bay Packers ===
After going undrafted in the 2016 NFL draft, Dorleant signed with the Green Bay Packers on May 6, 2016. On September 5, 2016, he was placed on injured reserve. On December 3, 2016, he was activated off injured reserve prior to Week 13. After getting injured against the Detroit Lions in the last game of the season, Dorleant was placed back on injured reserve on January 4, 2017.

On April 11, 2017, Dorleant was released by the Packers after failing a physical.

=== Kansas City Chiefs ===
On January 3, 2018, Dorleant signed a reserve/future contract with the Kansas City Chiefs. He was waived on September 1.

=== Baltimore Ravens ===
On September 19, 2018, Dorleant was signed to the Baltimore Ravens' practice squad. He was released on November 14.

=== Oakland Raiders ===
On December 27, 2018, Dorleant was signed to the Oakland Raiders practice squad.

Dorleant signed a reserve/future contract with the Raiders on January 1, 2019. He was waived on June 11, but was re-signed on August 13. Dorleant was waived/injured during final roster cuts on August 30, and reverted to the team's injured reserve list on September 1.

=== Winnipeg Blue Bombers ===
Dorleant signed with the Winnipeg Blue Bombers of the CFL on July 3, 2020. After the CFL canceled the 2020 season due to the COVID-19 pandemic, Dorleant chose to opt-out of his contract with the Blue Bombers on August 26, 2020.

== Personal life ==
On March 26, 2017, Deiondre' Hall and Dorleant were arrested after an incident at a bar in Cedar Falls, Iowa. Hall was charged with interference, public intoxication, and disorderly conduct while Dorleant was charged with interference. In May 2017, Dorleant was sentenced to a year of probation. In October 2017, he was suspended for one week by the NFL.
