= 2018 Green Bay Packers season =

NFL team season

- Owner: Green Bay Packers, Inc. (360,760 stockholders)
- General manager: Brian Gutekunst
- Head coach: Mike McCarthy (fired December 2, 4–7–1 record); Joe Philbin (interim, 2–2 record)
- Home stadium: Lambeau Field

Results
- Record: 6–9–1
- Division place: 3rd NFC North
- Playoffs: Did not qualify
- All-Pros: 1: LT David Bakhtiari (1st team)
- Pro Bowlers: 2: QB Aaron Rodgers; WR Davante Adams

Uniform
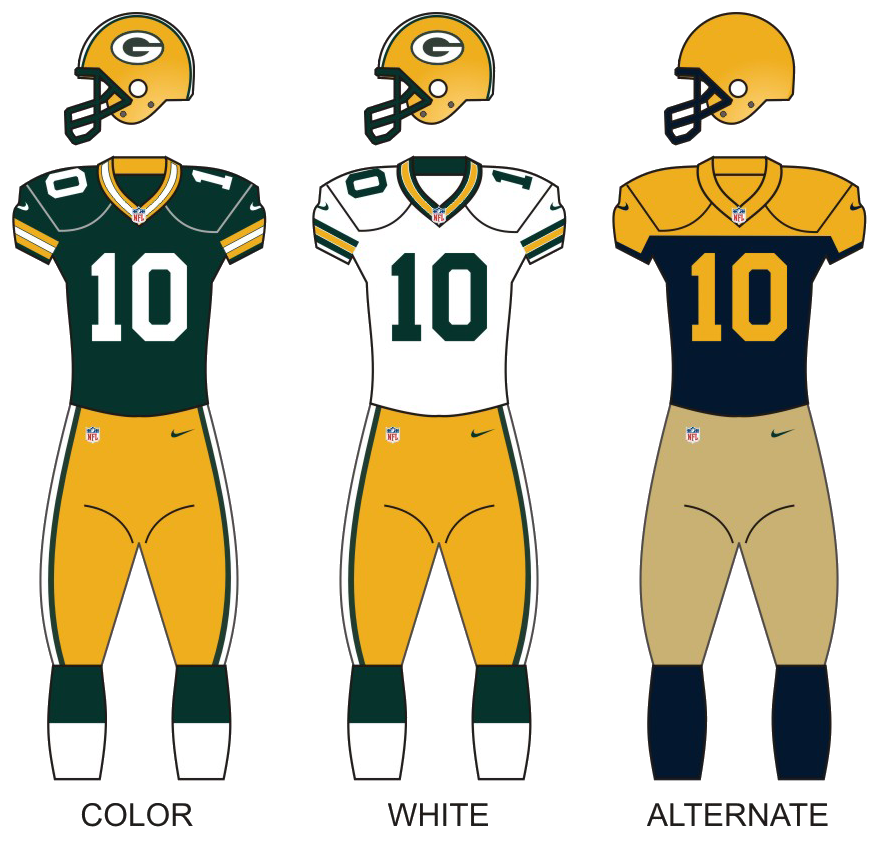

The 2018 season was the Green Bay Packers' 98th season in the National Football League (NFL), their 100th overall and their 13th and final season under head coach Mike McCarthy. After missing the playoffs for the first time since 2008 and losing quarterback Aaron Rodgers to injury during their 2017 season, the Packers failed to improve their 7–9 record from last season and finished with a 6–9–1 record, their worst since 2008.

For the first time since 2007, Jordy Nelson did not play for the Packers as he signed with the Oakland Raiders via free agency during the offseason.

On January 7, 2018, Brian Gutekunst was named the new general manager, after Ted Thompson took over as the senior advisor to football operations.

On December 2, 2018, after a 4–7–1 start, Mike McCarthy was fired hours after the Packers’ Week 13 loss to the Arizona Cardinals and Joe Philbin was named as the interim head coach. After a loss to the Chicago Bears in week 15, the Packers were eliminated from the postseason for the second consecutive season. This was the first time the Packers missed the postseason in consecutive years since 2005 to 2006. This was also the first time the Packers suffered from consecutive losing seasons since 1990 to 1991, a year before Brett Favre's arrival. McCarthy would be reunited with Aaron Rodgers in 2026 in Pittsburgh after Mike Tomlin stepped down as the head coach of the Steelers.

== Coaching moves ==
After missing the playoffs, the Packers made several coaching changes during its offseason, in addition to selecting Brian Gutekunst as the team's new GM. Notable coaching changes included:

- Dom Capers was fired as defensive coordinator, and replaced by former New York Jets defensive coordinator and Cleveland Browns head coach Mike Pettine.
- Edgar Bennett was fired as offensive coordinator, and replaced by Joe Philbin, who had previously served as the Packers offensive coordinator from 2007 to 2011.
- Mike Trgovac was fired as defensive line coach, and replaced by Jerry Montgomery.
- Alex Van Pelt left as quarterbacks coach, and was replaced by Frank Cignetti Jr.
- Luke Getsy left as receivers coach, and was replaced by David Raih.

== Player movements ==
=== Free agents ===
The league year and free agency started on March 14, 2018.

Position	Player	Free agency tag	Date signed	Team
OLB	Ahmad Brooks	UFA		
S	Morgan Burnett	UFA	March 20, 2018	Pittsburgh Steelers
NT	Quinton Dial	UFA		
G	Jahri Evans	UFA		
LS	Brett Goode	UFA		
CB	Davon House	UFA	April 13, 2018	Green Bay Packers
WR	Jeff Janis	UFA	March 30, 2018	Cleveland Browns
OT	Ulrick John	UFA	April 23, 2018	New England Patriots
TE	Richard Rodgers	UFA	April 4, 2018	Philadelphia Eagles
P	Jake Schum	RFA		
ILB	Joe Thomas	RFA	March 21, 2018	Dallas Cowboys
WR	Geronimo Allison	ERFA	March 14, 2018	Green Bay Packers
CB	Donatello Brown	ERFA	March 12, 2018	Green Bay Packers
QB	Joe Callahan	ERFA	March 13, 2018	Green Bay Packers
WR	Michael Clark	ERFA	March 12, 2018	Green Bay Packers
FB	Joe Kerridge	ERFA	March 14, 2018	Green Bay Packers
G	Justin McCray	ERFA	March 12, 2018	Green Bay Packers
OT	Adam Pankey	ERFA	March 13, 2018	Green Bay Packers
G	Lucas Patrick	ERFA	March 13, 2018	Green Bay Packers
LS	Taybor Pepper	ERFA		
CB	Herb Waters	ERFA	March 15, 2018	Green Bay Packers
S	Jermaine Whitehead	ERFA	March 14, 2018	Green Bay Packers

=== Trades ===
March 15, 2018	To Green Bay Packers DeShone Kizer; 2018 4th-round pick (101st); 2018 5th-round pick (138th)	To Cleveland Browns Damarious Randall; 2018 4th-round pick (114th); 2018 5th-round pick (150th)
August 26, 2018	To Green Bay Packers Antonio Morrison	To Indianapolis Colts Lenzy Pipkins
August 29, 2018	To Green Bay Packers 2019 6th-round pick	To Seattle Seahawks Brett Hundley
October 30, 2018	To Green Bay Packers 2019 4th-round pick	To Washington Redskins Ha Ha Clinton-Dix
October 30, 2018	To Green Bay Packers 2020 7th-round pick	To Baltimore Ravens Ty Montgomery

=== Additions ===
Position	Player	Former Team	Date
DE	Muhammad Wilkerson	New York Jets	March 15, 2018
TE	Jimmy Graham	Seattle Seahawks	March 16, 2018
CB	Tramon Williams	Arizona Cardinals	March 23, 2018
TE	Marcedes Lewis	Jacksonville Jaguars	May 25, 2018
G	Byron Bell	Dallas Cowboys	May 30, 2018
DT	Joey Mbu	Indianapolis Colts	June 11, 2018
G	Ethan Cooper	New York Giants	July 13, 2018
LB	James Hearns	Dallas Cowboys	August 4, 2018
RB	Akeem Judd	New York Jets	August 6, 2018
RB	LeShun Daniels	Washington Redskins	August 18, 2018
RB	Bronson Hill	Arizona Cardinals	August 19, 2018
LB	Korey Toomer	San Francisco 49ers	September 3, 2018
RB	Darius Jackson	Dallas Cowboys	September 3, 2018
CB	Deante Burton	Atlanta Falcons	September 11, 2018
CB	Will Redmond	Kansas City Chiefs	September 11, 2018
CB	Bashaud Breeland	Washington Redskins	September 26, 2018
P	Drew Kaser	Los Angeles Chargers	November 3, 2018
S	Ibraheim Campbell	New York Jets	November 5, 2018
S	Eddie Pleasant	Arizona Cardinals	November 28, 2018
DE	Fadol Brown	Oakland Raiders	December 5, 2018
CB	Natrell Jamerson	Houston Texans	December 5, 2018
G	Nico Siragusa	Baltimore Ravens	December 12, 2018
RB	Kapri Bibbs	Washington Redskins	December 17, 2018

=== Subtractions ===
Position	Player	New team	Release date
WR	Jordy Nelson	Oakland Raiders	March 15, 2018
ILB	David Talley		April 13, 2018
QB	Joe Callahan	Philadelphia Eagles	April 30, 2018
P	Justin Vogel	Cleveland Browns	May 4, 2018
G	Jacob Alsadek	Dallas Cowboys	May 30, 2018
WR	Colby Pearson	Atlanta Falcons	June 6, 2018
OT	Kyle Meadows	Pittsburgh Steelers	July 13, 2018
WR	Parris Bennett		July 24, 2018
WR	Michael Clark		July 25, 2018
G	Ethan Cooper	Kansas City Chiefs	August 6, 2018
CB	Herb Waters	Pittsburgh Steelers	September 3, 2018
S	Marwin Evans		September 11, 2018
CB	Deante Burton	Atlanta Falcons	September 19, 2018
RB	Darius Jackson	Dallas Cowboys	October 6, 2018
S	Jermaine Whitehead	Cleveland Browns	November 6, 2018

=== Draft ===
2018 Green Bay Packers draft
Round	Pick	Player	Position	College	Notes
1	18	Jaire Alexander *	Cornerback	Louisville	From Seattle
2	45	Joshua Jackson	Cornerback	Iowa	
3	88	Oren Burks	Linebacker	Vanderbilt	From Carolina
4	133	J'Mon Moore	Wide receiver	Missouri	Compensatory pick
5	138	Cole Madison	Guard	Washington State	From Cleveland
5	172	J. K. Scott	Punter	Alabama	Compensatory pick
5	174	Marquez Valdes-Scantling	Wide receiver	South Florida	Compensatory pick
6	207	Equanimeous St. Brown	Wide receiver	Notre Dame	Compensatory pick
7	232	James Looney	Defensive end	California	
7	239	Hunter Bradley	Long snapper	Mississippi State	From Buffalo
7	248	Kendall Donnerson	Linebacker	Southeast Missouri State	From Seattle
Made roster * Made at least one Pro Bowl during career

Draft trades

- The Packers traded their first-round pick (14th overall) to New Orleans in exchange for New Orleans’ first-round pick (27th overall), fifth-round pick (147th overall), and 2019 first-round pick.
- The Packers traded their first-round pick traded from the Saints (27th overall), a third-round pick (76th overall) and a sixth-round pick (186th overall) to Seattle in exchange for Seattle's 18th overall pick and a seventh-round pick (248th overall).
- The Packers traded their fourth-round pick (101st overall), and a fifth-round pick (147th overall) to Carolina in exchange for Carolina's 3rd-round pick (88th overall).
- The Packers traded their fourth- and fifth-round selections (114th and 150th overall), and cornerback Damarious Randall to Cleveland in exchange for Cleveland's fourth-and fifth-round selections (101st and 138th overall), and quarterback DeShone Kizer
- The Packers were awarded four compensatory picks (133rd, 172nd, 174th and 207th overall).
- The Packers traded linebacker Lerentee McCray to Buffalo in exchange for Buffalo's seventh-round selection (239th overall).

=== Undrafted free agent additions ===
Position	Player	College	Date
G	Jacob Alsadek	Arizona	May 4, 2018
LB	Parris Bennett	Syracuse	May 4, 2018
QB	Tim Boyle	Eastern Kentucky	May 4, 2018
C	Austin Davis	Duke	May 4, 2018
S	Raven Greene	James Madison	May 4, 2018
LB	Naashon Hughes	Texas	May 4, 2018
LB	CJ Johnson	East Texas Baptist	May 4, 2018
NT	Tyler Lancaster	Northwestern	May 4, 2018
OT	Alex Light	Richmond	May 4, 2018
OT	Kyle Meadows	Kentucky	May 4, 2018
NT	Filipo Mokofisi	Utah	May 4, 2018
LB	Marcus Porter	Fairmont State	May 4, 2018
TE	Kevin Rader	Youngstown State	May 4, 2018
DE	Conor Sheehy	Wisconsin	May 4, 2018
LB	Greer Martini	Notre Dame	May 7, 2018
TE	Ryan Smith	Miami (Ohio)	May 7, 2018
WR	Adonis Jennings	Temple	July 25, 2018
WR	Kyle Lewis	Cal Poly	July 25, 2018
ILB	James Crawford	Illinois	August 8, 2018

=== Roster cuts ===
The roster was cut to 53 on September 1, 2018.

Position	Player
G	Kofi Amichia
LB	Vince Biegel
RB	Joel Bouagnon
CB	Donatello Brown
TE	Emanuel Byrd
RB	LeShun Daniels
C	Austin Davis
C	Dillon Day
LB	Kendall Donnerson
S	Marwin Evans
CB	Demetri Goodson
CB	Josh Hawkins
LB	James Hearns
RB	Bronson Hill
LB	Naashon Hughes
WR	Adonis Jennings
FB	Joe Kerridge
NT	Tyler Lancaster
WR	Kyle Lewis
DE	James Looney
LB	Greer Martini
NT	Joey Mbu
LB	Chris Odom
OT	Adam Pankey
LB	Marcus Porter
TE	Kevin Rader
FB	Aaron Ripkowski
DE	Conor Sheehy
TE	Ryan Smith
LB	Ahmad Thomas
LS	Zach Triner
WR	DeAngelo Yancey

== Staff ==
2018 Green Bay Packers staff
Front office: Executive committee – Board of directors; President/CEO – Mark Murphy; General manager – Brian Gutekunst; Executive vice president/director of football operations – Russ Ball; Senior advisor to football operations – Ted Thompson; Co-director of player personnel – John Wojciechowski; Co-director of player personnel – Jon-Eric Sullivan; Director of college scouting – Matt Malaspina; National scout – Sam Seale; Head coaches: Interim Head coach/offensive coordinator – Joe Philbin; Offensive coaches: Pass game coordinator – Jim Hostler; Quarterbacks – Frank Cignetti Jr.; Running backs – Ben Sirmans; Wide receivers – David Raih; Tight ends – Brian Angelichio; Offensive line/run game coordinator – James Campen; Assistant offensive line – Jeff Blasko	Defensive coaches: Defensive coordinator – Mike Pettine; Pass game coordinator – Joe Whitt Jr.; Defensive line – Jerry Montgomery; Linebackers/run game coordinator – Patrick Graham; Secondary – Jason Simmons; Defensive assistant/outside linebackers – Scott McCurley; Defensive quality control – Ryan Downard; Special teams coaches: Special teams coordinator – Ron Zook; Special teams assistant – Maurice Drayton; Strength and conditioning: Strength and conditioning coordinator – Mark Lovat; Strength and conditioning assistant – Chris Gizzi; Strength and conditioning assistant – Thadeus Jackson; Strength and conditioning assistant – Grant Thorne

== Final roster ==
2018 Green Bay Packers roster
Quarterbacks (QB): 8 Tim Boyle; 9 DeShone Kizer; 12 Aaron Rodgers; Running backs (RB): 22 Kapri Bibbs; 24 Lavon Coleman; 45 Danny Vitale FB; 30 Jamaal Williams; Wide receivers (WR): 17 Davante Adams; 18 Randall Cobb; 16 Jake Kumerow; 13 Allen Lazard; 82 J'Mon Moore; 19 Equanimeous St. Brown; 83 Marquez Valdes-Scantling; Tight ends (TE): 80 Jimmy Graham; 84 Lance Kendricks; 89 Marcedes Lewis; 85 Robert Tonyan	Offensive linemen (OL): 69 David Bakhtiari LT; 75 Bryan Bulaga RT; 70 Alex Light RT; 63 Corey Linsley C; 64 Justin McCray G; 77 Adam Pankey G; 62 Lucas Patrick G; 56 Nico Siragusa G; 78 Jason Spriggs LT; 65 Lane Taylor G; Defensive linemen (DL): 90 Montravius Adams DE; 98 Fadol Brown DE; 95 Tyler Lancaster NT; 99 James Looney DE; 94 Dean Lowry DE	Linebackers (LB): 42 Oren Burks ILB; 54 James Crawford OLB; 51 Kyler Fackrell OLB; 93 Reggie Gilbert OLB; 50 Blake Martinez ILB; 52 Clay Matthews OLB; 44 Antonio Morrison ILB; Defensive backs (DB): 23 Jaire Alexander CB; 26 Bashaud Breeland CB; 29 Kentrell Brice SS; 28 Tony Brown CB; 37 Josh Jackson CB; 21 Natrell Jamerson CB; 27 Josh Jones SS; 35 Eddie Pleasant FS; 38 Tramon Williams FS; Special teams (ST): 43 Hunter Bradley LS; 2 Mason Crosby K; 6 J. K. Scott P	Practice squad: 49 Evan Baylis TE; 59 Eric Cotton OLB; 71 Anthony Coyle G (IR); 72 Gerhard de Beer RT; 91 Kendall Donnerson OLB; 46 Malcolm Johnson FB; 41 D. J. Killings CB; 34 Tray Matthews SS; 88 Teo Redding WR; 58 Brady Sheldon ILB; 79 Deon Simon NT; 40 Jason Thompson FS; 86 Ethan Wolf TE (IR); Reserve: 81 Geronimo Allison WR (IR); 74 Byron Bell G (IR); 39 Ibraheim Campbell SS (IR); 32 Tra Carson RB (IR); 97 Kenny Clark NT (IR); 76 Mike Daniels DE (IR); 11 Trevor Davis WR (IR); 36 Raven Greene FS (IR); 31 Davon House CB (IR); 33 Aaron Jones RB (IR); 20 Kevin King CB (IR); 53 Nick Perry OLB (IR); 25 Will Redmond CB (IR); 47 Jake Ryan ILB (IR); 96 Muhammad Wilkerson DE (IR); Rookies in italics 53 active, 17 reserve, 10 practice squad

== Preseason ==
The preseason schedule was announced on April 11, 2018.

Week	Date	Opponent	Result	Record	Game site	NFL.com recap
1	August 9	Tennessee Titans	W 31–17	1–0	Lambeau Field	Recap
2	August 16	Pittsburgh Steelers	W 51–34	2–0	Lambeau Field	Recap
3	August 24	at Oakland Raiders	L 6–13	2–1	Oakland–Alameda County Coliseum	Recap
4	August 30	at Kansas City Chiefs	L 21–33	2–2	Arrowhead Stadium	Recap

== Regular season ==
=== Schedule ===
The regular season schedule was announced on April 19, 2018.

Week	Date	Opponent	Result	Record	Game site	NFL.com recap
1	September 9	**Chicago Bears**	**W** 24–23	1–0	Lambeau Field	Recap
2	September 16	**Minnesota Vikings**	**T** 29–29 (OT)	1–0–1	Lambeau Field	Recap
3	September 23	at Washington Redskins	**L** 17–31	1–1–1	FedExField	Recap
4	September 30	Buffalo Bills	**W** 22–0	2–1–1	Lambeau Field	Recap
5	October 7	at **Detroit Lions**	**L** 23–31	2–2–1	Ford Field	Recap
6	October 15	San Francisco 49ers	**W** 33–30	3–2–1	Lambeau Field	Recap
7	Bye					
8	October 28	at Los Angeles Rams	**L** 27–29	3–3–1	Los Angeles Memorial Coliseum	Recap
9	November 4	at New England Patriots	**L** 17–31	3–4–1	Gillette Stadium	Recap
10	November 11	Miami Dolphins	**W** 31–12	4–4–1	Lambeau Field	Recap
11	November 15	at Seattle Seahawks	**L** 24–27	4–5–1	CenturyLink Field	Recap
12	November 25	at **Minnesota Vikings**	**L** 17–24	4–6–1	U.S. Bank Stadium	Recap
13	December 2	Arizona Cardinals	**L** 17–20	4–7–1	Lambeau Field	Recap
14	December 9	Atlanta Falcons	**W** 34–20	5–7–1	Lambeau Field	Recap
15	December 16	at **Chicago Bears**	**L** 17–24	5–8–1	Soldier Field	Recap
16	December 23	at New York Jets	**W** 44–38 (OT)	6–8–1	MetLife Stadium	Recap
17	December 30	**Detroit Lions**	**L** 0–31	6–9–1	Lambeau Field	Recap

Note: Intra-division opponents are in bold text.

=== Game summaries ===
==== Week 1: vs. Chicago Bears ====
Week 1: Chicago Bears at Green Bay Packers – Game summary

Quarter	1	2	3	4	Total
Bears	7	10	3	3	**23**
**Packers**	0	0	3	21	**24**

at Lambeau Field, Green Bay, Wisconsin

- Date: September 9
- Game time: 7:20 p.m. CDT
- Game weather: 62 °F (17 °C), clear
- Game attendance: 78,282
- Referee: Carl Cheffers
- TV announcers (NBC): Al Michaels, Cris Collinsworth, Michele Tafoya and Terry McAulay
- Recap, Gamebook

Game information

First quarter

- CHI – Mitchell Trubisky 2-yard run (Cody Parkey kick), 7:16. Bears 7–0. **Drive: 10 plays, 86 yards, 6:02.**

Second quarter

- CHI – Cody Parkey 26-yard field goal, 15:00. Bears 10–0. **Drive: 9 plays, 60 yards, 4:17.**
- CHI – Khalil Mack 27-yard interception return (Cody Parkey kick), 0:39. Bears 17–0.

Third quarter

- CHI – Cody Parkey 33-yard field goal, 9:18. Bears 20–0. **Drive: 12 plays, 60 yards, 5:46.**
- GB – Mason Crosby 42-yard field goal, 3:41. Bears 20–3. **Drive: 12 plays, 46 yards, 5:37.**

Fourth quarter

- GB – Geronimo Allison 39-yard pass from Aaron Rodgers (Mason Crosby kick), 14:06. Bears 20–10. **Drive: 8 plays, 81 yards, 2:55.**
- GB – Davante Adams 12-yard pass from Aaron Rodgers (Mason Crosby kick), 9:10. Bears 20–17. **Drive: 5 plays, 75 yards, 2:51.**
- CHI – Cody Parkey 32-yard field goal, 2:42. Bears 23–17. **Drive: 14 plays, 61 yards, 6:22.**
- GB – Randall Cobb 75-yard pass from Aaron Rodgers (Mason Crosby kick), 2:29. Packers 24–23. **Drive: 3 plays, 75 yards, 0:26.**

Top passers

- CHI – Mitchell Trubisky – 23/35, 171 yards
- GB – Aaron Rodgers – 20/30, 286 yards, 3 TD

Top rushers

- CHI – Jordan Howard – 15 rushes, 82 yards
- GB – Jamaal Williams – 15 rushes, 47 yards

Top receivers

- CHI – Taylor Gabriel – 5 receptions, 25 yards
- GB – Randall Cobb – 9 receptions, 142 yards, TD

This was the Packers' first win from a 17-point deficit or more entering the fourth quarter in franchise history. This was especially noted for Aaron Rodgers coming back into the game after being carted off with a leg injury in the first half.

==== Week 2: vs. Minnesota Vikings ====
Week 2: Minnesota Vikings at Green Bay Packers – Game summary

Quarter	1	2	3	4	OT	Total
Vikings	7	0	0	22	0	**29**
Packers	7	10	3	9	0	**29**

at Lambeau Field, Green Bay, Wisconsin

- Date: September 16
- Game time: 12:00 pm. CDT
- Game weather: 80 °F (27 °C), cloudy
- Game attendance: 78,461
- Referee: Tony Corrente
- TV announcers (Fox): Kevin Burkhardt, Charles Davis and Pam Oliver
- Recap, Gamebook

Game information

First quarter

- GB – Josh Jackson blocked punt recovery in end zone (Mason Crosby kick), 7:33. Packers 7–0.
- MIN – Laquon Treadwell 14-yard pass from Kirk Cousins (Daniel Carlson kick), 3:04. Tied 7–7. **Drive: 8 plays, 57 yards, 4:24.**

Second quarter

- GB – Davante Adams 9-yard pass from Aaron Rodgers (Mason Crosby kick), 12:34. Packers 14–7. **Drive: 11 plays, 75 yards, 5:36.**
- GB – Mason Crosby 37-yard field goal, 0:02. Packers 17–7. **Drive: 5 plays, 43 yards, 1:37.**

Third quarter

- GB – Mason Crosby 40-yard field goal, 6:36. Packers 20–7. **Drive: 10 plays, 67 yards, 5:04.**

Fourth quarter

- MIN – Stefon Diggs 3-yard pass from Kirk Cousins (Daniel Carlson kick), 14:21. Packers 20–14. **Drive: 9 plays, 71 yards, 4:02.**
- GB – Mason Crosby 31-yard field goal, 7:38. Packers 23–14. **Drive: 10 plays, 62 yards, 6:42.**
- MIN – Stefon Diggs 75-yard pass from Kirk Cousins (Daniel Carlson kick), 7:29. Packers 23–21. **Drive: 2 plays, 75 yards, 0:17.**
- GB – Mason Crosby 48-yard field goal, 2:17. Packers 26–21. **Drive: 10 plays, 39 yards, 5:05.**
- GB – Mason Crosby 36-yard field goal, 1:49. Packers 29–21. **Drive: 4 plays, −5 yards, 0:19.**
- MIN – Adam Thielen 22-yard pass from Kirk Cousins, (Two-point conversion, Stefon Diggs pass from Kirk Cousins), 0:36. Tied 29–29. **Drive: 8 plays, 75 yards, 1:14.**

Overtime

No scoring plays

Top passers

- MIN – Kirk Cousins – 35/48, 425 yards, 4 TD, INT
- GB – Aaron Rodgers – 30/42, 281 yards, TD

Top rushers

- MIN – Dalvin Cook – 10 rushes, 38 yards
- GB – Jamaal Williams – 16 rushes, 59 yards

Top receivers

- MIN – Adam Thielen – 12 receptions, 131 yards, TD
- GB – Jimmy Graham – 6 receptions, 95 yards

==== Week 3: at Washington Redskins ====
Week 3: Green Bay Packers at Washington Redskins – Game summary

Quarter	1	2	3	4	Total
Packers	0	10	7	0	**17**
**Redskins**	14	14	0	3	**31**

at FedEx Field, Landover, Maryland

- Date: September 23
- Game time: 1:00 p.m. EDT/12:00 pm. CDT
- Game weather: 62 °F (17 °C), rain
- Game attendance: 82,000
- Referee: Craig Wrolstad
- TV announcers (Fox): Kevin Burkhardt, Charles Davis and Pam Oliver
- Recap, Gamebook

Game information

First quarter

- WAS – Paul Richardson 46-yard pass from Alex Smith (Dustin Hopkins kick), 13:02. Redskins 7–0. **Drive: 4 plays, 75 yards, 2:06.**
- WAS – Adrian Peterson 2-yard run (Dustin Hopkins kick), 2:16. Redskins 14–0. **Drive: 10 plays, 79 yards, 6:04.**

Second quarter

- GB – Mason Crosby 41-yard field goal, 12:56. Redskins 14–3. **Drive: 9 plays, 52 yards, 4:22.**
- WAS – Jamison Crowder 9-yard pass from Alex Smith (Dustin Hopkins kick), 4:30. Redskins 21–3. **Drive: 8 plays, 98 yards, 3:14.**
- GB – Geronimo Allison 64-yard pass from Aaron Rodgers (Mason Crosby kick), 2:24. Redskins 21–10. **Drive: 4 plays, 76 yards, 2:11.**
- WAS – Adrian Peterson 2-yard run (Dustin Hopkins kick), 0:28. Redskins 28–10. **Drive: 5 plays, 74 yards, 1:54.**

Third quarter

- GB – Davante Adams 2-yard pass from Aaron Rodgers (Mason Crosby kick), 8:02. Redskins 28–17. **Drive: 15 plays, 75 yards, 7:02.**

Fourth quarter

- WAS – Dustin Hopkins 35-yard field goal, 02:00. Redskins 31–17. **Drive: 8 plays, 29 yards, 3:25.**

Top passers

- GB – Aaron Rodgers – 27/44, 265 yards, 2 TD
- WAS – Alex Smith – 12/20, 220 yards, 2 TD, INT

Top rushers

- GB – Aaron Jones – 6 rushes, 42 yards
- WAS – Adrian Peterson – 19 rushes, 120 yards, 2 TD

Top receivers

- GB – Davante Adams – 7 receptions, 52 yards, TD
- WAS – Jordan Reed – 4 receptions, 65 yards

==== Week 4: vs. Buffalo Bills ====
Week 4: Buffalo Bills at Green Bay Packers – Game summary

Quarter	1	2	3	4	Total
Bills	0	0	0	0	**0**
**Packers**	6	10	3	3	**22**

at Lambeau Field, Green Bay, Wisconsin

- Date: September 30
- Game time: 12:00 pm. CDT
- Game weather: 49 °F (9 °C), cloudy
- Game attendance: 78,312
- Referee: Bill Vinovich
- TV announcers (CBS): Ian Eagle, Dan Fouts, and Evan Washburn
- Recap, Gamebook

Game information

First quarter

- GB – Jimmy Graham 3-yard pass from Aaron Rodgers, 5:19. Packers 6–0. **Drive: 6 plays, 56 yards, 2:39.**

Second quarter

- GB – Aaron Jones 3-yard run (Mason Crosby kick), 11:09. Packers 13–0. **Drive: 9 plays, 83 yards, 5:22.**
- GB – Mason Crosby 52-yard field goal, 0:03. Packers 16–0. **Drive: 7 plays, 40 yards, 0:43.**

Third quarter

- GB – Mason Crosby 36-yard field goal, 11:17. Packers 19–0. **Drive: 10 plays, 57 yards, 3:47.**

Fourth quarter

- GB – Mason Crosby 52-yard field goal, 2:00. Packers 22–0. **Drive: 7 plays, 39 yards, 2:26.**

Top passers

- BUF – Josh Allen – 16/33, 151 yards, 2 INT
- GB – Aaron Rodgers – 22/40, 298 yards, TD, INT

Top rushers

- BUF – LeSean McCoy – 5 rushes, 24 yards
- GB – Aaron Jones – 11 rushes, 65 yards, TD

Top receivers

- BUF – Charles Clay – 4 receptions, 40 yards
- GB – Davante Adams – 8 receptions, 81 yards

==== Week 5: at Detroit Lions ====
Week 5: Green Bay Packers at Detroit Lions – Game summary

Quarter	1	2	3	4	Total
Packers	0	0	14	9	**23**
**Lions**	14	10	0	7	**31**

at Ford Field, Detroit, Michigan

- Date: October 7
- Game time: 1:00 pm. EDT/12:00 pm. CDT
- Game weather: Played indoors (dome stadium)
- Game attendance: 63,405
- Referee: John Hussey
- TV announcers (Fox): Thom Brennaman, Chris Spielman and Shannon Spake
- Recap, Gamebook

Game information

First quarter

- DET – LeGarrette Blount 1-yard run (Matt Prater kick), 10:34. Lions 7–0. **Drive: 1 play, 1 yard, 0:04.**
- DET – LeGarrette Blount 1-yard run (Matt Prater kick), 1:10. Lions 14–0. **Drive: 4 plays, 69 yards, 2:16.**

Second quarter

- DET – Matt Prater 39-yard field goal, 14:52. Lions 17–0. **Drive: 4 plays, 1 yard, 0:21.**
- DET – Marvin Jones 39-yard pass from Matthew Stafford (Matt Prater kick), 0:20. Lions 24–0. **Drive: 4 plays, 22 yards, 0:38.**

Third quarter

- GB – Marquez Valdes-Scantling 3-yard pass from Aaron Rodgers, (Two-point conversion, Jamaal Williams pass from Aaron Rodgers), 9:45. Lions 24–8. **Drive: 11 plays, 75 yards, 5:20.**
- GB – Lance Kendricks 1-yard pass from Aaron Rodgers, 1:19. Lions 24–14. **Drive: 11 plays, 55 yards, 4:41.**

Fourth quarter

- DET – Kenny Golladay 5-yard pass from Matthew Stafford (Matt Prater kick), 13:00. Lions 31–14. **Drive: 8 plays, 56 yards, 3:19.**
- GB – Davante Adams 12-yard pass from Aaron Rodgers, 9:07. Lions 31–20. **Drive: 8 plays, 75 yards, 3:54.**
- GB – Mason Crosby 41-yard field goal, 0:07. Lions 31–23. **Drive: 6 plays, 74 yards, 1:02.**

Top passers

- GB – Aaron Rodgers – 32/52, 442 yards, 3 TD
- DET – Matthew Stafford – 14/26, 183 yards, 2 TD

Top rushers

- GB – Aaron Jones – 7 rushes, 40 yards
- DET – Kerryon Johnson – 12 rushes, 70 yards

Top receivers

- GB – Davante Adams – 9 receptions, 140 yards, TD
- DET – Kenny Golladay – 4 receptions, 98 yards, TD

==== Week 6: vs. San Francisco 49ers ====
Week 6: San Francisco 49ers at Green Bay Packers – Game summary

Quarter	1	2	3	4	Total
49ers	14	10	3	3	**30**
**Packers**	17	3	3	10	**33**

at Lambeau Field, Green Bay, Wisconsin

- Date: October 15
- Game time: 7:15 pm. CDT
- Game weather: 37 °F (3 °C), clear
- Game attendance: 77,642
- Referee: John Parry
- TV announcers (ESPN): Joe Tessitore, Jason Witten, Booger McFarland and Lisa Salters
- Recap, Gamebook

Game information

First quarter

- SF – Matt Breida 3-yard run (Robbie Gould kick), 11:04. 49ers 7–0. **Drive: 7 plays, 75 yards, 4:01.**
- GB – Ty Montgomery 2-yard run (Mason Crosby kick), 9:20. Tied 7–7. **Drive: 4 plays, 77 yards, 1:42.**
- GB – Mason Crosby 29-yard field goal, 7:42. Packers 10–7. **Drive: 5 plays, 23 yards, 1:29.**
- GB – Davante Adams 9-yard pass from Aaron Rodgers (Mason Crosby kick), 2:02. Packers 17–7. **Drive: 5 plays, 79 yards, 2:54.**
- SF – Marquise Goodwin 67-yard pass from C. J. Beathard (Robbie Gould kick), 0:36. Packers 17–14. **Drive: 3 plays, 78 yards, 1:31.**

Second quarter

- GB – Mason Crosby 39-yard field goal, 7:38. Packers 20–14. **Drive: 9 plays, 23 yards, 4:38.**
- SF – Marquise Goodwin 30-yard pass from C. J. Beathard (Robbie Gould kick), 6:13. 49ers 21–20. **Drive: 3 plays, 65 yards, 1:29.**
- SF – Robbie Gould 39-yard field goal, 0:04. 49ers 24–20. **Drive: 11 plays, 32 yards, 5:07.**

Third quarter

- GB – Mason Crosby 51-yard field goal, 11:21. 49ers 24–23. **Drive: 7 plays, 42 yards, 3:43.**
- SF – Robbie Gould 44-yard field goal, 7:04. 49ers 27–23. **Drive: 9 plays, 49 yards, 4:18.**

Fourth quarter

- SF – Robbie Gould 43-yard field goal, 13:12. 49ers 30–23. **Drive: 10 plays, 58 yards, 5:12.**
- GB – Davante Adams 16-yard pass from Aaron Rodgers (Mason Crosby kick), 2:00. Tied 30–30. **Drive: 4 plays, 58 yards, 1:05.**
- GB – Mason Crosby 27-yard field goal, 0:03. Packers 33–30. **Drive: 10 plays, 81 yards, 1:07.**

Top passers

- SF – C. J. Beathard – 16/23, 245 yards, 2 TD, INT
- GB – Aaron Rodgers – 25/46, 425 yards, 2 TD

Top rushers

- SF – Raheem Mostert – 12 rushes, 87 yards
- GB – Aaron Jones – 8 rushes, 41 yards

Top receivers

- SF – Marquise Goodwin – 4 receptions, 126 yards, 2 TD
- GB – Davante Adams – 10 receptions, 132 yards, 2 TD

==== Week 8: at Los Angeles Rams ====
Week 8: Green Bay Packers at Los Angeles Rams – Game summary

Quarter	1	2	3	4	Total
Packers	7	3	10	7	**27**
**Rams**	0	8	15	6	**29**

at Los Angeles Memorial Coliseum, Los Angeles, California

- Date: October 28
- Game time: 3:25 pm. CDT/1:25 p.m. PDT
- Game weather: 82 °F (28 °C), cloudy
- Game attendance: 75,822
- Referee: Ronald Torbert
- TV announcers (Fox): Thom Brennaman, Troy Aikman and Erin Andrews
- Recap, Gamebook

Game information

First quarter

- GB – Jamaal Williams 1-yard run (Mason Crosby kick), 6:05. Packers 7–0. **Drive: 6 plays, 75 yards, 2:03.**

Second quarter

- GB – Mason Crosby 41-yard field goal, 14:23. Packers 10–0. **Drive: 7 plays, 45 yards, 3:53.**
- LAR – Aaron Jones tackled in the end zone by Mark Barron for a safety, 2:54. Packers 10–2.
- LAR – Josh Reynolds 1-yard pass from Jared Goff, 0:25. Packers 10–8. **Drive: 7 plays, 72 yards, 2:26.**

Third quarter

- GB – Mason Crosby 53-yard field goal, 9:43. Packers 13–8. **Drive: 9 plays, 38 yards, 4:19.**
- LAR – Todd Gurley 30-yard pass from Jared Goff (Jared Goff-Todd Gurley pass), 7:28. Rams 16–13. **Drive: 7 plays, 75 yards, 2:19.**
- LAR – Josh Reynolds 19-yard pass from Jared Goff (Greg Zuerlein kick), 1:56. Rams 23–13. **Drive: 8 plays, 66 yards, 4:17.**
- GB – Aaron Jones 33-yard run (Mason Crosby kick), 0:21. Rams 23–20. **Drive: 5 plays, 75 yards, 1:37.**

Fourth quarter

- LAR – Greg Zuerlein 43-yard field goal, 11:44. Rams 26–20. **Drive: 8 plays, 50 yards, 3:34.**
- GB – Marquez Valdes-Scantling 40-yard pass from Aaron Rodgers (Mason Crosby kick), 8:57. Packers 27–26. **Drive: 5 plays, 75 yards, 2:49.**
- LAR – Greg Zuerlein 34-yard field goal, 2:09. Rams 29–27. **Drive: 7 plays, 24 yards, 3:15.**

Top passers

- GB – Aaron Rodgers – 18/30, 286 yards, TD
- LAR – Jared Goff – 19/35, 295 yards, 3 TD

Top rushers

- GB – Aaron Jones – 12 rushes, 86 yards, TD
- LAR – Todd Gurley – 25 rushes, 114 yards

Top receivers

- GB – Davante Adams – 5 receptions, 133 yards
- LAR – Todd Gurley – 6 receptions, 81 yards, TD

==== Week 9: at New England Patriots ====
Week 9: Green Bay Packers at New England Patriots – Game summary

Quarter	1	2	3	4	Total
Packers	3	7	7	0	**17**
**Patriots**	7	10	0	14	**31**

at Gillette Stadium, Foxborough, Massachusetts

- Date: November 4
- Game time: 8:20 pm. EST/7:20 pm. CST
- Game weather: 40 °F (4 °C), clear
- Game attendance: 65,878
- Referee: Brad Allen
- TV announcers (NBC): Al Michaels, Cris Collinsworth, Michele Tafoya and Terry McAulay
- Preview, Gamebook

Game information

First quarter

- NE – James White 8-yard run (Stephen Gostkowski kick), 11:40. Patriots 7–0. **Drive: 10 plays, 59 yards, 3:20.**
- GB – Mason Crosby 29-yard field goal, 5:05. Patriots 7–3. **Drive: 14 plays, 62 yards, 6:35.**

Second quarter

- NE – Stephen Gostkowski 28-yard field goal, 13:30. Patriots 10–3. **Drive: 7 plays, 78 yards, 1:44.**
- GB – Davante Adams 2-yard pass from Aaron Rodgers (Mason Crosby kick), 4:49. Tied 10–10. **Drive: 13 plays, 79 yards, 6:48.**
- NE – Cordarrelle Patterson 5-yard run (Stephen Gostkowski kick), 1:57. Patriots 17–10. **Drive: 7 plays, 69 yards, 3:52.**

Third quarter

- GB – Jimmy Graham 15-yard pass from Aaron Rodgers (Mason Crosby kick), 11:18. Tied 17–17. **Drive: 7 plays, 76 yards, 3:42.**

Fourth quarter

- NE – James White 1-yard run (Stephen Gostkowski kick), 10:06. Patriots 24–17. **Drive: 10 plays, 76 yards, 4:46.**
- NE – Josh Gordon 55-yard pass from Tom Brady (Stephen Gostkowski kick), 7:20. Patriots 31–17. **Drive: 3 plays, 72 yards, 1:10.**

Top passers

- GB – Aaron Rodgers – 24/43, 259 yards, 2 TD
- NE – Tom Brady – 22/35, 294 yards, TD

Top rushers

- GB – Aaron Jones – 14 carries, 76 yards
- NE – Cordarrelle Patterson – 11 carries, 61 yards, TD

Top receivers

- GB – Marquez Valdes-Scantling – 3 receptions, 101 yards
- NE – Josh Gordon – 5 receptions, 130 yards, TD

==== Week 10: vs. Miami Dolphins ====
Week 10: Miami Dolphins at Green Bay Packers – Game summary

Quarter	1	2	3	4	Total
Dolphins	3	6	3	0	**12**
**Packers**	7	7	14	3	**31**

at Lambeau Field, Green Bay, Wisconsin

- Date: November 11
- Game time: 3:25 pm. CST
- Game weather: 33 °F (1 °C), cloudy
- Game attendance: 78,076
- Referee: Clay Martin
- TV announcers (CBS): Kevin Harlan, Rich Gannon and Steve Tasker
- Recap, Gamebook

Game information

First quarter

- GB – Davante Adams 7-yard pass from Aaron Rodgers (Mason Crosby kick), 6:07. Packers 7–0. **Drive: 8 plays, 70 yards, 4:54.**
- MIA – Jason Sanders 37-yard field goal, 1:22. Packers 7–3. **Drive: 7 plays, 26 yards, 3:20.**

Second quarter

- GB – Aaron Jones 2-yard run (Mason Crosby kick), 15:00. Packers 14–3. **Drive: 3 plays, 71 yards, 1:25.**
- MIA – Jason Sanders 25-yard field goal, 10:33. Packers 14–6. **Drive: 10 plays, 78 yards, 4:24.**
- MIA – Jason Sanders 47-yard field goal, 2:54. Packers 14–9. **Drive: 5 plays, 16 yards, 2:42.**

Third quarter

- MIA – Jason Sanders 40-yard field goal, 11:43. Packers 14–12. **Drive: 4 plays, 6 yards, 1:23.**
- GB – Aaron Jones 10-yard run (Mason Crosby kick), 9:38. Packers 21–12. **Drive: 5 plays, 60 yards, 2:10.**
- GB – Davante Adams 25-yard pass from Aaron Rodgers (Mason Crosby kick), 7:31. Packers 28–12. **Drive: 3 plays, 27 yards, 1:27.**

Fourth quarter

- GB – Mason Crosby 38-yard field goal, 8:57. Packers 31–12. **Drive: 11 plays, 60 yards, 5:58.**

Top passers

- MIA – Brock Osweiler – 23/37, 213 yards, INT
- GB – Aaron Rodgers – 19/28, 199 yards, 2 TD

Top rushers

- MIA – Frank Gore – 13 carries, 90 yards
- GB – Aaron Jones – 15 carries, 145 yards, 2 TD

Top receivers

- MIA – Danny Amendola – 7 receptions, 72 yards
- GB – Davante Adams – 4 receptions, 57 yards, 2 TD

==== Week 11: at Seattle Seahawks ====
Week 11: Green Bay Packers at Seattle Seahawks – Game summary

Quarter	1	2	3	4	Total
Packers	14	7	0	3	**24**
**Seahawks**	3	14	0	10	**27**

at CenturyLink Field, Seattle, Washington

- Date: November 15
- Game time: 7:20 pm. CST/5:20 pm. PST
- Game weather: 54 °F (12 °C), partly cloudy
- Game attendance: 69,007
- Referee: Tony Corrente
- TV announcers (Fox/NFLN): Joe Buck, Troy Aikman, Erin Andrews and Kristina Pink
- Recap, Gamebook

Game information

First quarter

- GB – Aaron Jones 8-yard run (Mason Crosby kick), 13:46. Packers 7–0. **Drive: 3 plays, 29 yards, 1:07.**
- SEA – Sebastian Janikowski 39-yard field goal, 6:00. Packers 7–3. **Drive: 9 plays, 52 yards, 4:46.**
- GB – Robert Tonyan 54-yard pass from Aaron Rodgers (Mason Crosby kick), 3:10. Packers 14–3. **Drive: 6 plays, 75 yards, 2:50.**

Second quarter

- SEA – Doug Baldwin 6-yard pass from Russell Wilson (Sebastian Janikowski kick), 8:03. Packers 14–10. **Drive: 14 plays, 85 yards, 7:31.**
- SEA – Chris Carson 1-yard run (Sebastian Janikowski kick), 3:22. Seahawks 17–14. **Drive: 3 plays, 22 yards, 1:25.**
- GB – Aaron Jones 24-yard pass from Aaron Rodgers (Mason Crosby kick), 0:44. Packers 21–17. **Drive: 5 plays, 75 yards, 2:38.**

Third quarter

- No scoring plays.

Fourth quarter

- SEA – Sebastian Janikowski 43-yard field goal, 12:14. Packers 21–20. **Drive: 13 plays, 77 yards, 6:30.**
- GB – Mason Crosby 36-yard field goal, 8:23. Packers 24–20. **Drive: 7 plays, 57 yards, 3:51.**
- SEA – Ed Dickson 15-yard pass from Russell Wilson (Sebastian Janikowski kick), 5:08. Seahawks 27–24. **Drive: 7 plays, 75 yards, 3:15.**

Top passers

- GB – Aaron Rodgers – 21/30, 332 yards, 2 TD
- SEA – Russell Wilson – 21/31, 225 yards, 2 TD

Top rushers

- GB – Aaron Jones – 11 carries, 40 yards, 1 TD
- SEA – Chris Carson – 17 carries, 83 yards, 1 TD

Top receivers

- GB – Davante Adams – 10 receptions, 166 yards
- SEA – Tyler Lockett – 5 receptions, 71 yards

==== Week 12: at Minnesota Vikings ====
Week 12: Green Bay Packers at Minnesota Vikings – Game summary

Quarter	1	2	3	4	Total
Packers	7	7	0	3	**17**
**Vikings**	7	7	10	0	**24**

at U.S. Bank Stadium, Minneapolis, Minnesota

- Date: November 25
- Game time: 7:20 pm. CST
- Game weather: Played indoors (dome stadium)
- Game attendance: 66,872
- Referee: Bill Vinovich
- TV announcers (NBC): Al Michaels, Cris Collinsworth, Michele Tafoya and Terry McAulay
- Recap, Gamebook

Game information

First quarter

- GB – Davante Adams 15-yard pass from Aaron Rodgers (Mason Crosby kick), 6:01. Packers 7–0. **Drive: 7 plays, 68 yards, 3:37.**
- MIN – Dalvin Cook 26-yard pass from Kirk Cousins (Dan Bailey kick), 3:00. Tied 7–7. **Drive: 6 plays, 75 yards, 3:01.**

Second quarter

- GB – Aaron Jones 6-yard run (Mason Crosby kick), 14:21. Packers 14–7. **Drive: 7 plays, 75 yards, 3:37.**
- MIN – Stefon Diggs 30-yard pass from Kirk Cousins (Dan Bailey kick), 11:07. Tied 14–14. **Drive: 8 plays, 75 yards, 3:15.**

Third quarter

- MIN – Dan Bailey 37-yard field goal, 3:31. Vikings 17–14. **Drive: 7 plays, 25 yards, 3:54.**
- MIN – Adam Thielen 14-yard pass from Kirk Cousins (Dan Bailey kick), 0:36. Vikings 24–14. **Drive: 4 plays, 31 yards, 1:19.**

Fourth quarter

- GB – Mason Crosby 38-yard field goal, 2:25. Vikings 24–17. **Drive: 9 plays, 73 yards, 2:31.**

Top passers

- GB – Aaron Rodgers – 17/28, 198 yards, TD
- MIN – Kirk Cousins – 29/38, 342 yards, 3 TD

Top rushers

- GB – Aaron Jones – 17 rushes, 72 yards, TD
- MIN – Latavius Murray – 11 rushes, 33 yards

Top receivers

- GB – Davante Adams – 5 receptions, 69 yards, TD
- MIN – Adam Thielen – 8 receptions, 125 yards, TD

==== Week 13: vs. Arizona Cardinals ====
Week 13: Arizona Cardinals at Green Bay Packers – Game summary

Quarter	1	2	3	4	Total
**Cardinals**	0	7	10	3	**20**
Packers	0	10	0	7	**17**

at Lambeau Field, Green Bay, Wisconsin

- Date: December 2
- Game time: 12:00 pm. CST
- Game weather: 34 °F (1 °C), snow
- Game attendance: 77,234
- Referee: Pete Morelli
- TV announcers (Fox): Chris Myers, Daryl Johnston and Laura Okmin
- Recap, Gamebook

Game information

First quarter

No scoring plays

Second quarter

- GB – Davante Adams 13-yard pass from Aaron Rodgers (Mason Crosby kick), 11:35. Packers 7–0. **Drive: 5 plays, 35 yards, 2:13.**
- ARI – Chase Edmonds 6-yard run (Zane Gonzalez kick), 4:46. Tied 7–7. **Drive: 11 plays, 70 yards, 6:47.**
- GB – Mason Crosby 32-yard field goal, 0:18. Packers 10–7. **Drive: 14 plays, 46 yards, 4:27.**

Third quarter

- ARI – Zane Gonzalez 32-yard field goal, 5:22. Tied 10–10. **Drive: 6 plays, 61 yards, 2:24.**
- ARI – Chase Edmonds 8-yard run (Zane Gonzalez kick), 2:01. Cardinals 17–10. **Drive: 4 plays, 70 yards, 1:38.**

Fourth quarter

- GB – Aaron Jones 8-yard run (Mason Crosby kick), 5:31. Tied 17–17. **Drive: 11 plays, 95 yards, 5:51.**
- ARI – Zane Gonzalez 44-yard field goal, 1:45. Cardinals 20–17. **Drive: 11 plays, 54 yards, 3:45.**

Top passers

- ARI – Josh Rosen – 11/26, 149 yards
- GB – Aaron Rodgers – 31/50, 233 yards, TD

Top rushers

- ARI – David Johnson – 20 carries, 69 yards
- GB – Aaron Jones – 11 carries, 36 yards, TD

Top receivers

- ARI – Christian Kirk – 3 receptions, 54 yards
- GB – Davante Adams – 8 receptions, 93 yards, TD

In an upset, the Packers lost to the Cardinals at home for the first time since 1949, when the Cardinals were based in Chicago, snapping a nine-game home winning streak.

Hours after the game, head coach Mike McCarthy was fired by the Packers.

==== Week 14: vs. Atlanta Falcons ====
Week 14: Atlanta Falcons at Green Bay Packers – Game summary

Quarter	1	2	3	4	Total
Falcons	7	0	0	13	**20**
**Packers**	7	13	14	0	**34**

at Lambeau Field, Green Bay, Wisconsin

- Date: December 9
- Game time: 12:00 pm. CST
- Game weather: 25 °F (−4 °C), cloudy
- Game attendance: 77,329
- Referee: Walt Coleman
- TV announcers (Fox): Kevin Burkhardt, Charles Davis and Pam Oliver
- Recap, Gamebook

Game information

First quarter

- ATL – Julio Jones 16-yard pass from Matt Ryan (Matt Bryant kick), 11:43. Falcons 7–0. **Drive: 7 plays, 80 yards, 3:24.**
- GB – Davante Adams 7-yard pass from Aaron Rodgers (Mason Crosby kick), 7:16. Tied 7–7. **Drive: 9 plays, 69 yards, 4:25.**

Second quarter

- GB – Mason Crosby 50-yard field goal, 7:45. Packers 10–7. **Drive: 12 plays, 43 yards, 6:02.**
- GB – Bashaud Breeland 22-yard interception return (Mason Crosby kick), 6:08. Packers 17–7.
- GB – Mason Crosby 48-yard field goal, 0:03. Packers 20–7. **Drive: 10 plays, 43 yards, 2:45.**

Third quarter

- GB – Randall Cobb 24-yard pass from Aaron Rodgers (Mason Crosby kick), 12:49. Packers 27–7. **Drive: 6 plays, 47 yards, 2:16.**
- GB – Aaron Jones 29-yard run (Mason Crosby kick), 5:57. Packers 34–7. **Drive: 8 plays, 71 yards, 4:38.**

Fourth quarter

- ATL – Julio Jones 12-yard pass from Matt Ryan (Matt Bryant kick), 13:39. Packers 34–14. **Drive: 12 plays, 78 yards, 4:13.**
- ATL – Justin Hardy 19-yard pass from Matt Ryan, 0:18. Packers 34–20. **Drive: 10 plays, 54 yards, 2:23.**

Top passers

- ATL – Matt Ryan – 28/42, 262 yards, 3 TD, INT
- GB – Aaron Rodgers – 21/32, 196 yards, 2 TD

Top rushers

- ATL – Ito Smith – 11 carries, 60 yards
- GB – Aaron Jones – 17 carries, 78 yards, 2 TD

Top receivers

- ATL – Julio Jones – 8 receptions, 106 yards, 2 TD
- GB – Davante Adams – 7 receptions, 81 yards, TD

==== Week 15: at Chicago Bears ====
Week 15: Green Bay Packers at Chicago Bears – Game summary

Quarter	1	2	3	4	Total
Packers	0	3	11	3	**17**
**Bears**	7	7	0	10	**24**

at Soldier Field, Chicago, Illinois

- Date: December 16
- Game time: 12:00 pm. CST
- Game weather: 45 °F (7 °C), fair
- Game attendance: 62,372
- Referee: John Hussey
- TV announcers (Fox): Chris Myers, Daryl Johnston and Laura Okmin
- Recap, Gamebook

Game information

First quarter

- CHI – Jordan Howard 9-yard run (Cody Parkey kick), 2:12. Bears 7–0. **Drive: 9 plays, 60 yards, 6:21.**

Second quarter

- GB – Mason Crosby 41-yard field goal, 7:31. Bears 7–3. **Drive: 9 plays, 43 yards, 5:02.**
- CHI – Tarik Cohen 12-yard pass from Mitchell Trubisky (Cody Parkey kick), 0:38. Bears 14–3. **Drive: 5 plays, 61 yards, 1:12.**

Third quarter

- GB – Mason Crosby 43-yard field goal, 9:30. Bears 14–6. **Drive: 11 plays, 50 yards, 5:34.**
- GB – Jamaal Williams 10-yard run, (Two-point conversion, Davante Adams pass from Aaron Rodgers), 4:15. Tied 14–14. **Drive: 5 plays, 50 yards, 2:15.**

Fourth quarter

- CHI – Trey Burton 13-yard pass from Mitchell Trubisky (Cody Parkey kick), 10:21. Bears 21–14. **Drive: 5 plays, 32 yards, 2:56.**
- CHI – Cody Parkey 24-yard field goal, 6:46. Bears 24–14. **Drive: 4 plays, 9 yards, 2:29.**
- GB – Mason Crosby 45-yard field goal, 0:15. Bears 24–17. **Drive: 10 plays, 42 yards, 2:31.**

Top passers

- GB – Aaron Rodgers – 25/42, 274 yards, INT
- CHI – Mitchell Trubisky – 20/28, 235 yards, 2 TD

Top rushers

- GB – Jamaal Williams – 12 carries, 55 yards, TD
- CHI – Jordan Howard – 19 carries, 60 yards, TD

Top receivers

- GB – Davante Adams – 8 receptions, 119 yards
- CHI – Allen Robinson – 3 receptions, 54 yards

With the loss the Packers not only allowed the Bears to clinch the NFC North but they themselves were disqualified from playoff contention. This was also the Packers last loss to the Bears in Chicago until 2025, and their last one overall until 2024.

==== Week 16: at New York Jets ====
Week 16: Green Bay Packers at New York Jets – Game summary

Quarter	1	2	3	4	OT	Total
**Packers**	0	17	3	18	6	**44**
Jets	7	14	14	3	0	**38**

at MetLife Stadium, East Rutherford, New Jersey

- Date: December 23
- Game time: 1:00 pm. EST/12:00 pm. CST
- Game weather: 43 °F (6 °C), sunny
- Game attendance: 77,982
- Referee: Ronald Torbert
- TV announcers (Fox): Kenny Albert, Ronde Barber and Kristina Pink
- Recap, Gamebook

Game information

First quarter

- NYJ – Elijah McGuire 4-yard run (Jason Myers kick), 2:20. Jets 7–0. **Drive: 12 plays, 83 yards, 6:39.**

Second quarter

- NYJ – Robby Anderson 33-yard pass from Sam Darnold (Jason Myers kick), 9:09. Jets 14–0. **Drive: 8 plays, 76 yards, 5:12.**
- GB – Jake Kumerow 49-yard pass from Aaron Rodgers (Mason Crosby kick), 5:14. Jets 14–7. **Drive: 6 plays, 95 yards, 3:56.**
- NYJ – Andre Roberts 99-yard kickoff return (Jason Myers kick), 5:02. Jets 21–7.
- GB – Jamaal Williams 7-yard run (Mason Crosby kick), 1:39. Jets 21–14. **Drive: 6 plays, 62 yards, 3:21.**
- GB – Mason Crosby 42-yard field goal, 0:06. Jets 21–17. **Drive: 9 plays, 32 yards, 0:52.**

Third quarter

- GB – Mason Crosby 29-yard field goal, 8:20. Jets 21–20. **Drive: 11 plays, 69 yards, 6:43.**
- NYJ – Chris Herndon 5-yard pass from Sam Darnold (Jason Myers kick), 4:25. Jets 28–20. **Drive: 7 plays, 75 yards, 3:56.**
- NYJ – Elijah McGuire 20-yard pass from Sam Darnold (Jason Myers kick), 2:58. Jets 35–20. **Drive: 2 plays, 28 yards, 1:24.**

Fourth quarter

- GB – Mason Crosby 38-yard field goal, 11:49. Jets 35–23. **Drive: 7 plays, 41 yards, 2:26.**
- GB – Aaron Rodgers 1-yard run (Mason Crosby kick), 6:37. Jets 35–30. **Drive: 8 plays, 51 yards, 3:02.**
- GB – Aaron Rodgers 1-yard run (Two-point conversion, Aaron Rodgers run), 1:16. Packers 38–35. **Drive: 11 plays, 83 yards, 2:00.**
- NYJ – Jason Myers 33-yard field goal, 0:21. Tied 38–38. **Drive: 6 plays, 23 yards, 0:55.**

Overtime

- GB – Davante Adams 16-yard pass from Aaron Rodgers, 6:28. Packers 44–38. **Drive: 8 plays, 45 yards, 3:37.**

Top passers

- GB – Aaron Rodgers – 37/55, 442 yards, 2 TD
- NYJ – Sam Darnold – 24/35, 341 yards, 3 TD

Top rushers

- GB – Jamaal Williams – 15 carries, 95 yards, TD
- NYJ – Elijah McGuire – 14 carries, 35 yards, TD

Top receivers

- GB – Equanimeous St. Brown – 5 receptions, 94 yards
- NYJ – Robby Anderson – 9 receptions, 140 yards, TD

==== Week 17: vs. Detroit Lions ====
Week 17: Detroit Lions at Green Bay Packers – Game summary

Quarter	1	2	3	4	Total
**Lions**	7	14	3	7	**31**
Packers	0	0	0	0	**0**

at Lambeau Field, Green Bay, Wisconsin

- Date: December 30
- Game time: 12:00 pm. CST
- Game weather: 26 °F (−3 °C), cloudy
- Game attendance: 77,341
- Referee: Alex Kemp
- TV announcers (Fox): Justin Kutcher, Robert Smith, Pat McAfee and Sarah Kustok
- Recap, Gamebook

Game information

First quarter

- DET – T. J. Jones 5-yard pass from Matthew Stafford (Matt Prater kick), 3:01. Lions 7–0. **Drive: 12 plays, 65 yards, 5:08.**
- DET – Levine Toilolo 8-yard pass from Matt Prater (Matt Prater kick), 1:41. Lions 14–0. **Drive: 11 plays, 78 yards, 5:57.**

Second quarter

- DET – Zach Zenner 13-yard run (Matt Prater kick), 1:11. Lions 21–0. **Drive: 13 plays, 96 yard, 3:51.**

Third quarter

- DET – Matt Prater 43-yard field goal, 3:12. Lions 24–0. **Drive: 8 plays, 38 yards, 3:53.**

Fourth quarter

- DET – T. J. Jones 23-yard pass from Matthew Stafford (Matt Prater kick), 6:59. Lions 31–0. **Drive: 5 plays, 55 yards, 2:46.**

Top passers

- DET – Matthew Stafford – 20/32, 266 yards, 2 TD
- GB – DeShone Kizer – 16/35, 132 yards, INT

Top rushers

- DET – Zach Zenner – 21 carries, 93 yards, TD
- GB – DeShone Kizer – 4 carries, 40 yards

Top receivers

- DET – Brandon Powell – 6 receptions, 103 yards
- GB – Marquez Valdes-Scantling – 3 receptions, 43 yards

=== Standings ===
==== Division ====
NFC North
	W	L	T	PCT	DIV	CONF	PF	PA	STK
^{(3)} Chicago Bears	12	4	0	.750	5–1	10–2	421	283	W4
Minnesota Vikings	8	7	1	.531	3–2–1	6–5–1	360	341	L1
Green Bay Packers	6	9	1	.406	1–4–1	3–8–1	376	400	L1
Detroit Lions	6	10	0	.375	2–4	4–8	324	360	W1

==== Conference ====
NFC
#	Team	Division	W	L	T	PCT	DIV	CONF	SOS	SOV	STK
**Division leaders**
1 (Note: New Orleans finished ahead of LA Rams based on head-to-head victory, claiming the No. 1 seed.)	New Orleans Saints	South	13	3	0	.813	4–2	9–3	.482	.488	L1
2	Los Angeles Rams	West	13	3	0	.813	6–0	9–3	.480	.428	W2
3	Chicago Bears	North	12	4	0	.750	5–1	10–2	.430	.419	W4
4	Dallas Cowboys	East	10	6	0	.625	5–1	9–3	.488	.444	W2
**Wild Cards**
5	Seattle Seahawks	West	10	6	0	.625	3–3	8–4	.484	.400	W2
6	Philadelphia Eagles	East	9	7	0	.563	4–2	6–6	.518	.486	W3
**Did not qualify for the postseason**
7	Minnesota Vikings	North	8	7	1	.531	3–2–1	6–5–1	.504	.355	L1
8 (Note: Atlanta finished ahead of Washington based on head-to-head victory. Atlanta finished ahead of Carolina based on head-to-head sweep. Washington finished ahead of Carolina based on head-to-head victory.)	Atlanta Falcons	South	7	9	0	.438	4–2	7–5	.482	.348	W3
9	Washington Redskins	East	7	9	0	.438	2–4	6–6	.486	.371	L2
10	Carolina Panthers	South	7	9	0	.438	2–4	5–7	.508	.518	W1
11	Green Bay Packers	North	6	9	1	.406	1–4–1	3–8–1	.488	.417	L1
12	Detroit Lions	North	6	10	0	.375	2–4	4–8	.504	.427	W1
13 (Note: NY Giants finished ahead of Tampa Bay based on head-to-head victory.)	New York Giants	East	5	11	0	.313	1–5	4–8	.527	.487	L3
14	Tampa Bay Buccaneers	South	5	11	0	.313	2–4	4–8	.523	.506	L4
15	San Francisco 49ers	West	4	12	0	.250	1–5	2–10	.504	.406	L2
16	Arizona Cardinals	West	3	13	0	.188	2–4	3–9	.527	.302	L4
**Tiebreakers** (Note: When breaking ties for three or more teams under the NFL's rules, they are first broken within divisions, then comparing only the highest-ranked remaining team from each division.)

== Statistics ==
=== Starters ===
==== Offense ====
Pos.	Name	GS
QB	Aaron Rodgers	16
RB	Jamaal Williams; Aaron Jones	8; 8
WR	Randall Cobb; Marquez Valdes-Scantling; Jake Kumerow	6; 10; 2
WR	Davante Adams	15
WR	Geronimo Allison; Equanimeous St. Brown	4; 7
TE	Jimmy Graham; Marcedes Lewis; Lance Kendricks; Robert Tonyan	12; 4; 3; 1
LT	David Bakhtiari	16
LG	Lane Taylor; Lucas Patrick	14; 2
C	Corey Linsley	16
RG	Justin McCray; Byron Bell; Lucas Patrick	5; 9; 2
RT	Bryan Bulaga; Jason Spriggs	14; 2

==== Defense ====
Pos.	Name	GS
NT	Kenny Clark; Tyler Lancaster	10; 5
DE	Muhammad Wilkerson; Mike Daniels; Dean Lowry; Kenny Clark; Montravius Adams	3; 9; 8; 3; 1
OLB	Nick Perry; Kyler Fackrell	9; 7
OLB	Clay Matthews III	16
ILB	Blake Martinez; Antonio Morrison; Oren Burks	16; 8; 4
CB	Tramon Williams	7
CB	Kevin King; Bashaud Breeland	6; 5
CB	Josh Jackson; Jaire Alexander; Tony Brown	10; 11; 3
S	Kentrell Brice; Eddie Pleasant	10; 1
S	Ha Ha Clinton-Dix; Josh Jones; Ibraheim Campbell	7; 5; 1
S	Jermaine Whitehead; Tramon Williams	2; 9

=== Team leaders ===
Category	Player(s)	Value
Passing yards	Aaron Rodgers	4442
Passing touchdowns	Aaron Rodgers	25
Rushing yards	Aaron Jones	728
Rushing touchdowns	Aaron Jones	8
Receptions	Davante Adams	111
Receiving yards	Davante Adams	1386
Receiving touchdowns	Davante Adams	13
Kickoff return yards	Ty Montgomery	210
Punt return yards	Tramon Williams	83
Tackles	Blake Martinez	144
Sacks	Kyler Fackrell	10.5
Interceptions	Ha Ha Clinton-Dix	3

=== League rankings ===
Category	Total yards	Yards per game	NFL rank (out of 32)
Passing offense	4238	264.9	9th
Rushing offense	1667	104.2	22nd
Total offense	5905	369.1	12th
Passing defense	3752	234.5	12th
Rushing defense	1918	119.9	22nd
Total defense	5670	354.4	18th

Statistical values are correct at the end of the season

== Awards ==
Recipient	Award(s)
Davante Adams	Probowler
David Bakhtiari	2018 All-Pro Team
Mason Crosby	Week 6: Special Teams Player of the Week
Aaron Rodgers	Week 6: FedEx Air Player of the Week (quarterbacks)
Aaron Rodgers	Probowler
