= Muhammad Wilkerson =

American football player (born 1989)

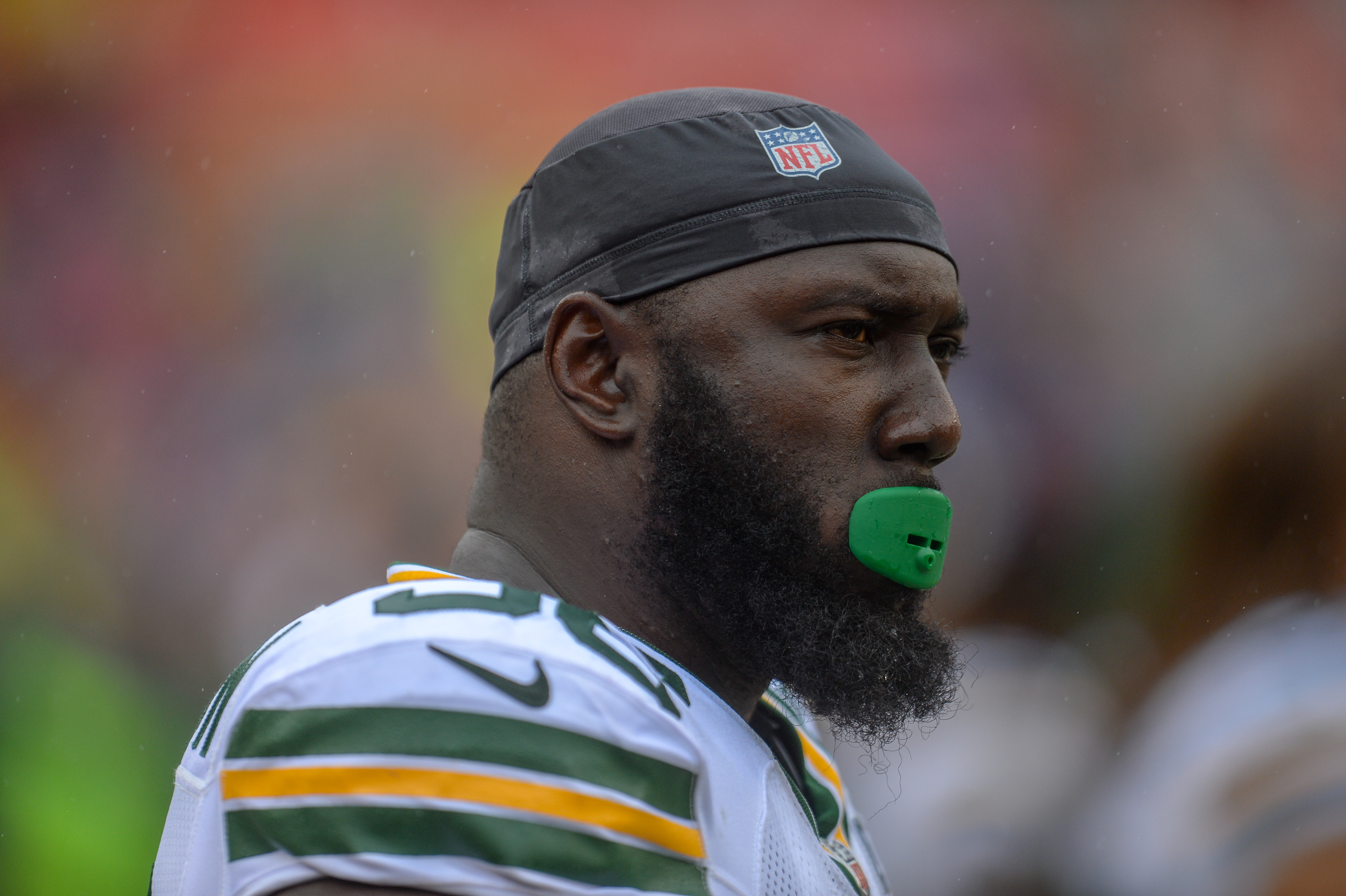
- Wilkerson with the Green Bay Packers in 2018

No. 96
- Position: Defensive end

Personal information
- Born: October 22, 1989 (age 37); Elizabeth, New Jersey, U.S.
- Listed height: 6 ft 4 in (1.93 m)
- Listed weight: 315 lb (143 kg)

Career information
- High school: Linden (Linden, New Jersey)
- College: Temple (2008–2010)
- NFL draft: 2011: 1st round, 30th overall pick

Career history
- New York Jets (2011–2017); Green Bay Packers (2018)

Awards and highlights
- 2× Second-team All-Pro (2013, 2015); Pro Bowl (2015); 2× First-team All-MAC (2009, 2010)

Career NFL statistics
- Total tackles: 410
- Sacks: 44.5
- Forced fumbles: 11
- Fumble recoveries: 1
- Interceptions: 2
- Defensive touchdowns: 1
- Stats at Pro Football Reference

Muhammad Hassan "Mo" Wilkerson (born October 22, 1989) is an American former professional football player who was a defensive end in the National Football League (NFL). He played college football for the Temple Owls, and was selected by the New York Jets in the first round of the 2011 NFL draft.

Wilkerson remained with the Jets for seven seasons, where he was a Pro Bowl selection in 2015 and a two-time Second-team All-Pro selection in 2013 and 2015. In 2017, Wilkerson's relationship with the franchise soured due to violations of team rules, leading to his release after the season. He then signed with the Green Bay Packers in 2018, but missed most of the season due to injury.

== Early life ==
Wilkerson attended Linden High School in his hometown of Linden, New Jersey. He recorded 78 tackles, five sacks, one forced fumble, and one fumble recovery in his senior season. He was named to the All-Watchung Conference first-team in his junior season. He was selected to the Home News Tribune all-area first-team and Newark Star Ledger all-Union County second-team. He also helped lead Linden to state titles during his junior and senior years in basketball.

College recruiting
Name	Hometown	School	Height	Weight	40^{‡}	Commit date
Muhammad Wilkerson; Defensive tackle	Linden, New Jersey	Linden High School	6 ft 5 in (1.96 m)	255 lb (116 kg)	–	Feb 5, 2007
Muhammad Wilkerson; Defensive tackle	Recruit ratings: Scout: Rivals:					
Overall recruit ranking: Scout: NR (DE) Rivals: NR (DE), NR (NJ)
‡ Refers to 40-yard dash; Note: In many cases, Scout, Rivals, 247Sports, On3, and ESPN may conflict in their listings of height, weight and 40 time.; In these cases, the average was taken. ESPN grades are on a 100-point scale.; Sources: "Temple Football Commitments". Rivals.; "2007 Temple Football Recruiting Commits". Scout.; "Scout.com Team Recruiting Rankings". Scout.; "2007 Team Ranking". Rivals.com.

== College career ==
After high school, Wilkerson spent a year at Hargrave Military Academy. He subsequently enrolled at Temple University, where he played for the Temple Owls football team. As a freshman at Temple in 2008, Wilkerson played in 11 games and recorded 13 tackles and a sack. As a sophomore in 2009, he started all 13 games and recorded 58 tackles and six sacks.

As a junior in 2010, Wilkerson recorded 68 tackles and 10 sacks. Following his junior season, he was named to the first-team All-MAC selection and the team defensive MVP.

== Professional career ==
=== Pre-draft ===
Pre-draft measurables
Height	Weight	Arm length	Hand span	Wingspan	40-yard dash	10-yard split	20-yard split	20-yard shuttle	Three-cone drill	Vertical jump	Broad jump	Bench press
6 ft 4 1/8 in (1.93 m)	315 lb (143 kg)	35 1/4 in (0.90 m)	10 in (0.25 m)	7 ft 1 1/4 in (2.17 m)	5.05 s	1.80 s	2.94 s	4.59 s	7.31 s	29.0 in (0.74 m)	8 ft 10 in (2.69 m)	27 reps
All values from NFL Combine/Pro Day

Wilkerson was initially what analysts termed "a sleeper selection"; however, following positive results at the NFL Combine and at Temple's Pro Day session, Wilkerson's draft stock rose significantly. He became regarded as a versatile prospect whom NFL Network analyst Mike Mayock compared to Trevor Pryce, concluding that Wilkerson was a first round prospect.

=== New York Jets ===
Wilkerson was drafted by the New York Jets in the first round with the thirtieth overall selection in the 2011 NFL Draft. He was the fourth Temple player to be drafted by the Jets, preceded by Mike Stromberg, Joe Klecko and Dave Yovanovits. He also became the Owls' highest draft pick since Paul Palmer, who was selected nineteenth overall in the 1987 NFL draft. Head coach Rex Ryan reiterated Wilkerson possesses similar attributes to Trevor Pryce. Wilkerson signed a four-year, $7.4 million contract on July 31, 2011.

==== 2011 season ====
During the third preseason game against the New York Giants, Wilkerson got into a fight with running back Brandon Jacobs, resulting in both players getting ejected. He made his NFL debut in the season opener on September 11 against the Dallas Cowboys, and recorded his first career sack a week later, sacking Jacksonville Jaguars quarterback Luke McCown in the end zone for a safety. Wilkerson started all 16 games in 2011 making 49 tackles with 3 sacks, 2 passes defended, 1 forced fumble, and 1 safety enforced.

==== 2012 season ====
During a game against the Seattle Seahawks on November 11, 2012, Wilkerson scooped up a fumble lost by Russell Wilson and returned it for a touchdown. The Jets lost the game 7–28, however. In 16 games (15 starts) of 2012, Wilkerson made 69 tackles with 5 sacks, 4 passes defended, 3 forced fumbles, and 1 fumble recovery returned for a touchdown.

==== 2013 season ====
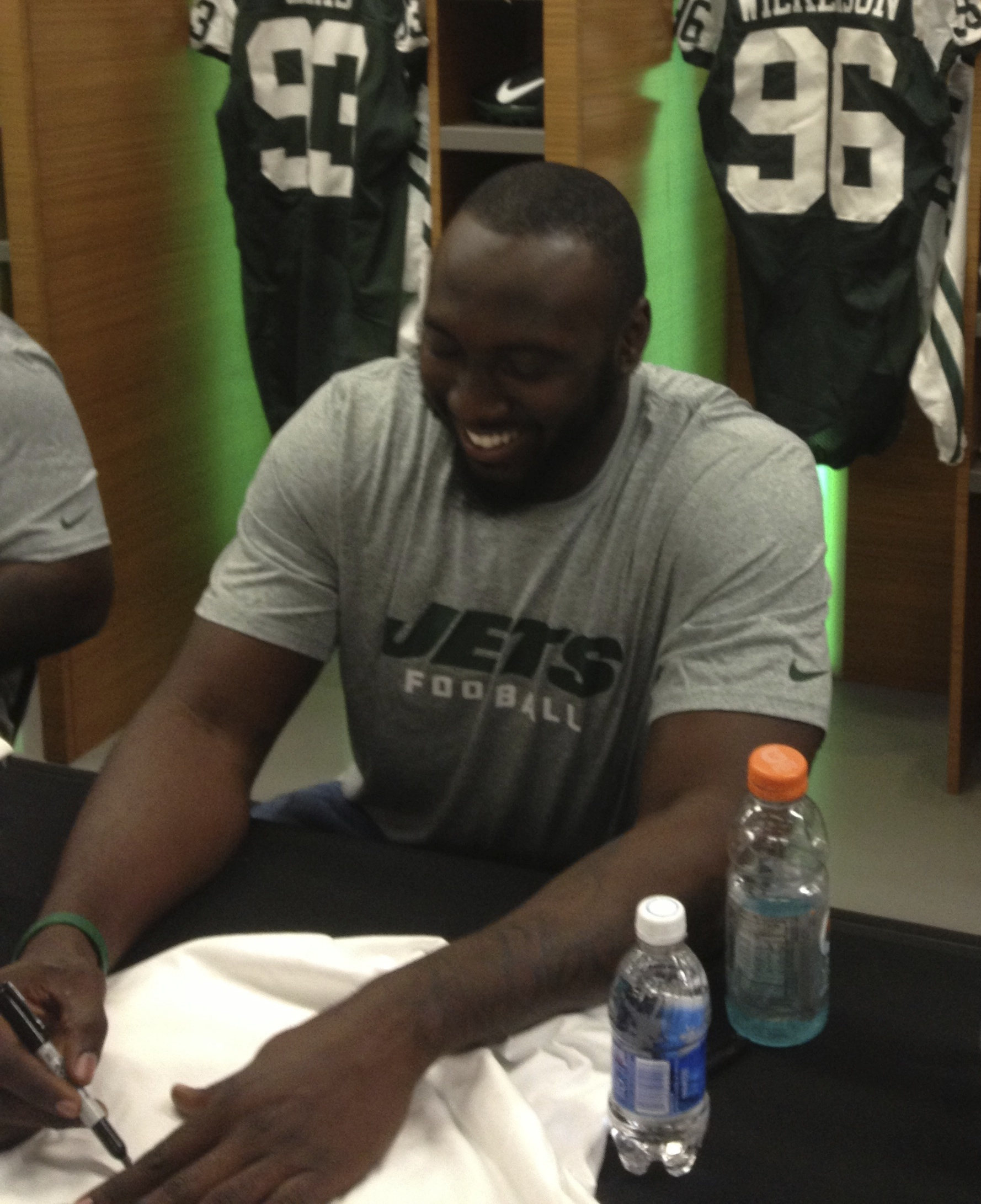
Wilkerson signing autographs in April 2013.

Wilkerson finished the 2013 season with a combined 63 tackles, 10.5 sacks, 2 FF, and an interception. For his outstanding play, he was selected to the second All-Pro team by the Associated Press.

==== 2014 season ====
On April 18, 2014, the Jets picked up the fifth-year, $6.96 million option of Wilkerson's rookie contract. During a game against the Green Bay Packers on September 14, 2014, he was disqualified for the first time in a regular season game for getting into a scuffle with several Packers players following their go-ahead touchdown. On September 20, 2014, Wilkerson was fined $20,000 by the NFL for his role in the brawl. In 13 starts, Wilkerson finished the year with 56 tackles, 6 sacks, 5 passes defended, and 1 forced fumble.

==== 2015 season ====
During Week 17 against the Buffalo Bills on January 3, 2016, Wilkerson suffered a broken leg and was carted off the field as the Jets lost the game 17–22 and were eliminated from playoff contention despite finishing the year with a 10–6 record. In 16 games, Wilkerson made 64 tackles, 12 sacks, 7 passes defended, and 3 fumble recoveries. He was a Pro Bowl selection for the first time of his career. He was ranked 39th by his fellow players on the NFL Top 100 Players of 2016.

Wilkerson was selected for the 2016 Pro Bowl, but was unable to participate due to a right fibula fracture sustained during the Jets' final game of the season.

==== 2016 season ====
On July 15, 2016, Wilkerson signed a 5-year deal worth $86 million featuring $53 million guaranteed and a $15 million signing bonus. Wilkerson played 15 games in 2016, starting 14 of them, finishing with 58 tackles, 4.5 sacks, 3 passes defended, and a forced fumble.

==== 2017 season ====
On December 15, the Jets announced that Wilkerson would be scratched for the upcoming Week 15 game against the New Orleans Saints due to showing up late for a team meeting. It was also revealed the Wilkerson had a history of violating team rules, including showing up late or missing team meetings, therefore putting his tenure with the Jets in jeopardy. Wilkerson was inactive again for Week 16 against the Los Angeles Chargers. It was revealed that Wilkerson showed up late for team meetings four times in the past three years, and the Jets intended to release Wilkerson if he was inactive for one more game due to any sort of disciplinary reason. Ultimately, Wilkerson was declared inactive for the season finale against the New England Patriots in Week 17. Limited to 13 games (12 starts), Wilkerson finished with 46 tackles, 3.5 sacks, 4 passes defended, and an interception.

On February 28, 2018, Wilkerson was released by the Jets.

=== Green Bay Packers ===
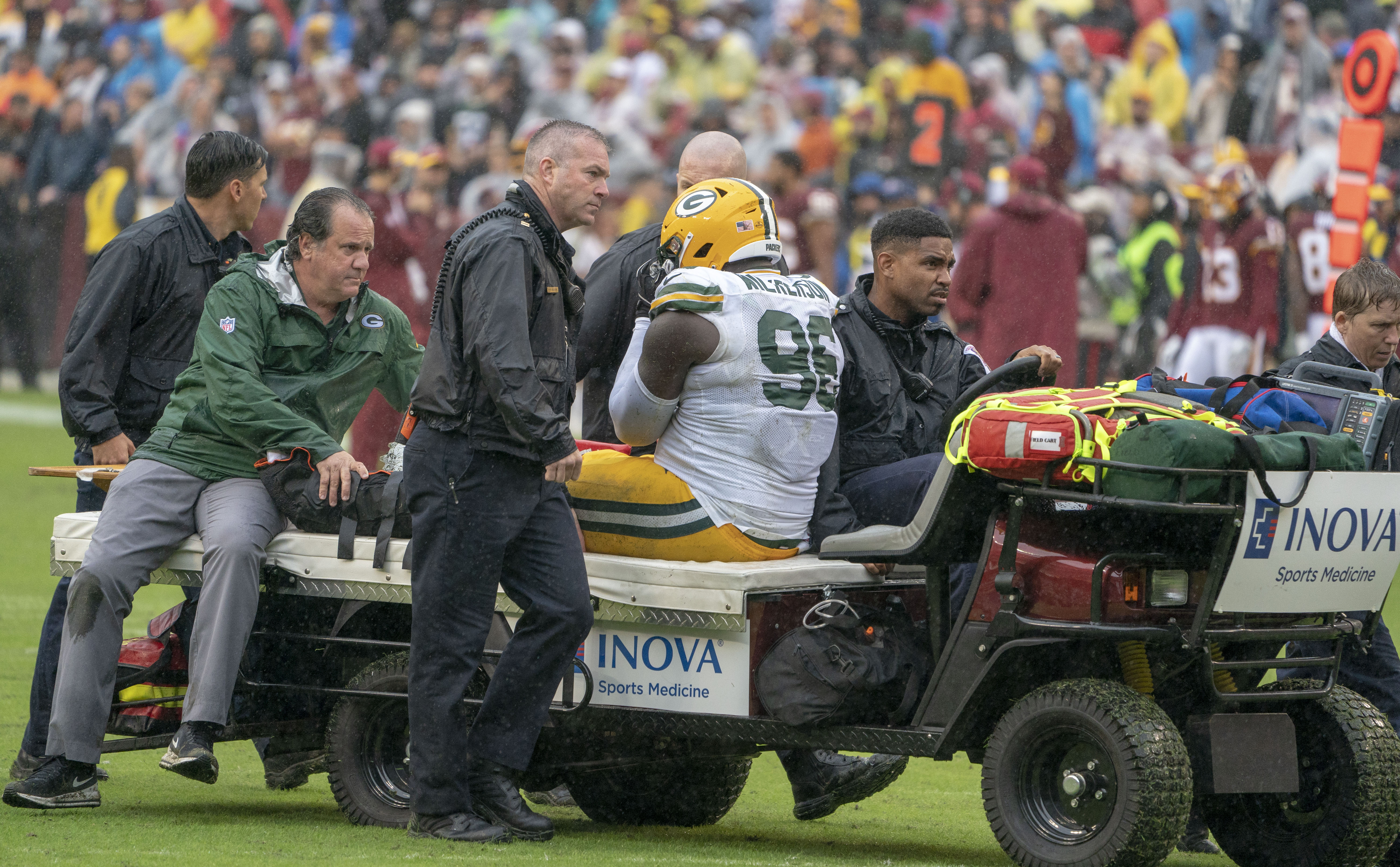
Wilkerson suffering a season ending ankle injury in a game against the Washington Redskins

On March 15, 2018, Wilkerson signed a one-year deal with the Green Bay Packers worth $5 million.

On September 23, 2018, during Week 3 against the Washington Redskins, Wilkerson suffered a serious ankle injury after teammate Kentrell Brice accidentally leg-whipped him while attempting to tackle Washington running back Chris Thompson. Wilkerson was carted off the field and underwent surgery the same night in a Washington, D.C. hospital, causing him to miss the team flight back to Wisconsin. The Packers placed Wilkerson on injured reserve on September 29, ending his season. He posted five total tackles for the 2018 season prior to the injury.

Wilkerson became a free agent in March 2019. He was suspended for the first two weeks of the 2020 NFL season on September 11, 2020, and had his suspension lifted on September 22.

== NFL career statistics ==
=== Regular season ===
Year	Team	GP	GS	COMB	TOTAL	AST	SACK	FF	FR	FR YDs	INT	INT YDs	AVG	LNG	TD	PD	STF	STF YDs	KB
2011	NYJ	16	16	49	35	14	3.0	1	0	0	0	0	0	0	0	2	9	16	0
2012	NYJ	16	15	69	36	33	5.0	3	1	21	0	0	0	0	1	4	4	10	1
2013	NYJ	16	16	63	43	20	10.5	2	0	0	1	6	6	6	0	3	6	14	0
2014	NYJ	13	13	56	31	25	6.0	1	0	0	0	0	0	0	0	5	11	23	0
2015	NYJ	16	15	64	39	25	12.0	2	0	0	0	0	0	0	0	7	5	7	0
2016	NYJ	15	14	58	33	25	4.5	1	0	0	0	0	0	0	0	3	6	15	0
2017	NYJ	13	12	46	26	20	3.5	0	0	0	1	3	3	0	0	4	2	3	0
2018	GB	3	3	5	2	3	0	0	0	0	0	0	0	0	0	0	0	0	0
Career		108	104	410	245	165	44.5	10	1	21	2	9	4.5	6	0	28	43	88	1
Source: NFL.com

== Personal life ==
Wilkerson is a Muslim.

== Legal issues ==
On June 1, 2019, Wilkerson was arrested for DWI in Washington Heights, New York. At around 3:30 A.M., he was pulled over after running a stop sign. His alcohol content measured .09, exceeding the legal limit of .08 in New York.

On March 4, 2020, it was revealed that Wilkerson was arrested by New Jersey State Police for DWI plus possession of marijuana and paraphernalia. It was Wilkerson's second DWI offense spanning within nine months.
