= Kentrell Brice =

American football player (born 1994)

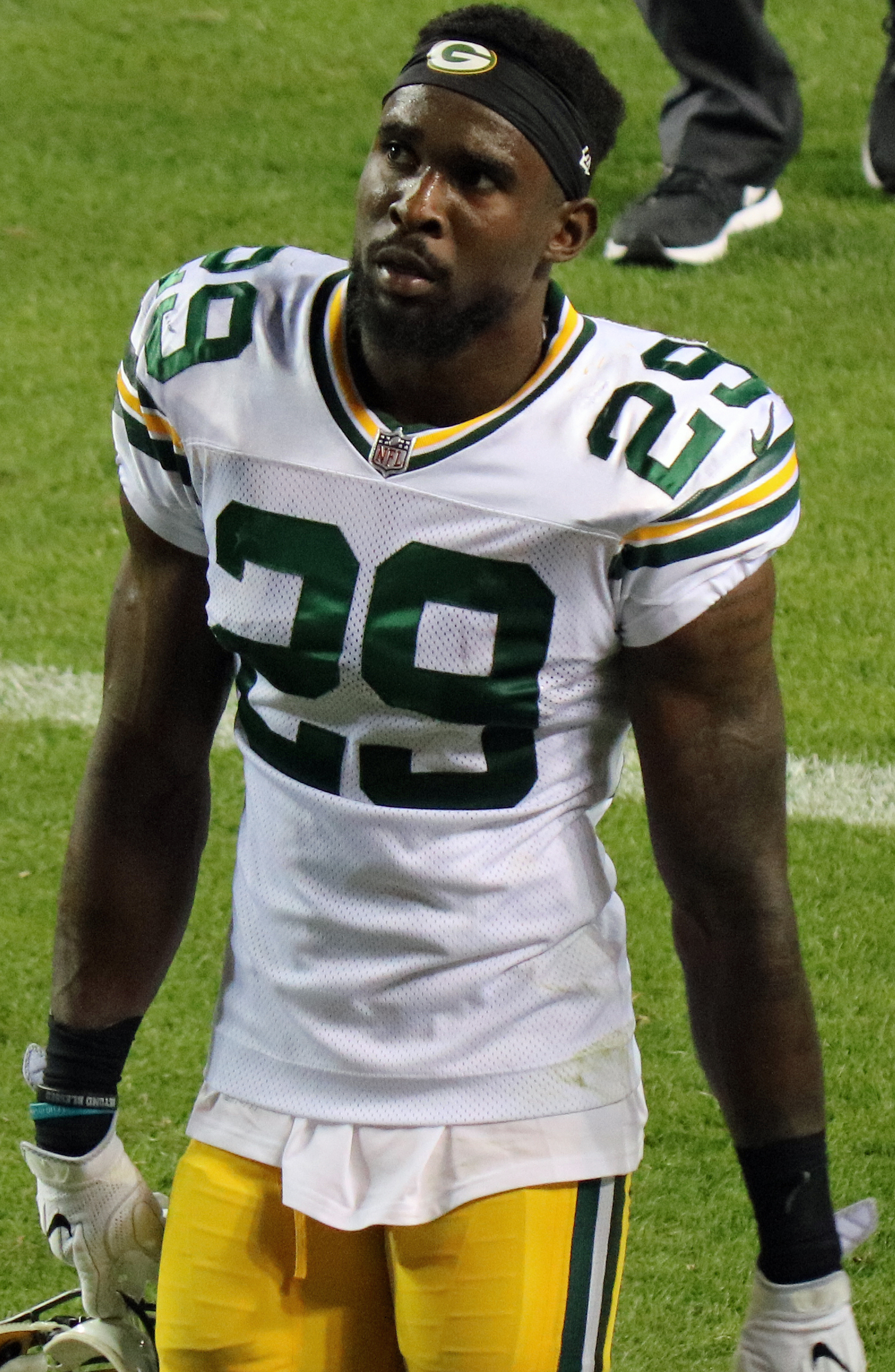
- Brice with the Green Bay Packers in 2017

No. 29
- Position: Safety

Personal information
- Born: August 11, 1994 (age 32); Ruston, Louisiana, U.S.
- Listed height: 5 ft 11 in (1.80 m)
- Listed weight: 200 lb (91 kg)

Career information
- High school: Ruston
- College: Louisiana Tech
- NFL draft: 2016: undrafted

Career history
- Green Bay Packers (2016–2018); Tampa Bay Buccaneers (2019)*; Seattle Dragons (2020)*; Chicago Bears (2020)*; Arizona Cardinals (2020)*; Saskatchewan Roughriders (2021); DC Defenders (2023–2024)
- * Offseason or practice squad member only

Career NFL statistics
- Total tackles: 99
- Sacks: 1.0
- Pass deflections: 6
- Interceptions: 1
- Stats at Pro Football Reference

Kentrell Montez Brice (born August 11, 1994) is an American former professional football player who was a safety in the National Football League (NFL). He played college football for the Louisiana Tech Bulldogs and signed with the Green Bay Packers as an undrafted free agent in 2016. He was also a member of the Tampa Bay Buccaneers, Seattle Dragons, Chicago Bears, Arizona Cardinals, Saskatchewan Roughriders, and DC Defenders.

== Professional career ==
=== Pre-draft ===
On March 22, 2016, Brice attended Louisiana Tech's pro day and had an impressive performance after completing all of the drills. His vertical jump (42") would have finished first among all defensive backs at the NFL Combine and his broad jump (11'1") and bench press (21 reps) would have ranked second among defensive backs. Brice received a private workout for the Green Bay Packers the following week. At the conclusion of the pre-draft process, Brice was projected to go undrafted and was expected to be signed as an undrafted free agent. He was ranked as the 16th best strong safety prospect in the draft by DraftScout.com and was ranked the 44th best safety by Scouts Inc.

Pre-draft measurables
Height	Weight	40-yard dash	10-yard split	20-yard split	20-yard shuttle	Three-cone drill	Vertical jump	Broad jump	Bench press
5 ft 11 in (1.80 m)	200 lb (91 kg)	4.44 s	1.56 s	2.53 s	4.40 s	7.66 s	41 1/2 in (1.05 m)	11 ft 1 in (3.38 m)	21 reps
All values from Louisiana Tech's Pro Day

=== Green Bay Packers ===
==== 2016 ====
Brice went undrafted in the 2016 NFL draft, but received undrafted free agent contract offers from the Packers, Tampa Bay Buccaneers, and Jacksonville Jaguars. On May 1, 2016, the Green Bay Packers signed Brice to a three-year, $1.62 million contract that includes a signing bonus of $2,000 as an undrafted free agent.

Throughout training camp, Brice competed for a roster spot as a backup safety against Marwin Evans, Jermaine Whitehead, and Chris Banjo. Head coach Mike McCarthy named him the third free safety on the Packers' depth chart to start the season, behind veterans Ha Ha Clinton-Dix and Banjo.

He made his professional regular season debut in the Packers' season-opening 27–23 win at the Jacksonville Jaguars. On September 25, 2016, Brice made his first career tackle in the Packers' 34–27 victory against the Detroit Lions. He finished their Week 3 victory with two combined tackles. On October 31, 2016, the Packers released safety Banjo. Brice subsequently became the primary backup free safety after Banjo's release. On November 13, 2016, he collected a season-high five combined tackles and a pass deflection during the Packer's 25–47 loss to the Tennessee Titans. In Week 17, Brice earned his first career start as an extra defensive back and recorded a season-high five solo tackles during a 31–24 win against the Detroit Lions. He finished his rookie season in 2016 with 26 combined tackles (22 solo) and a pass deflection in 16 games and one start.

The Packers finished first in the NFC North with a 10–6 record and earned a playoff berth in 2016. On January 8, 2017, Brice appeared in his first career playoff game and made one tackle in the Packers' 38–13 win against the New York Giants in the NFC Wildcard Game. The following week, Brice collected a season-high seven combined tackles and broke up a pass in a 34–31 victory at the Dallas Cowboys in the NFC Divisional Round. The Packers were eliminated from the playoffs after losing 44–21 at the Atlanta Falcons in the NFC Championship Game.

==== 2017 ====
Brice entered training camp as a backup safety and competed to retain the role against rookie Josh Jones. McCarthy named Brice the primary backup strong safety, behind Morgan Burnett, to begin the regular season in 2017.

On September 17, 2017, Brice recorded three solo tackles before exiting the Packers' 34–23 loss at the Falcons due to a groin injury. His injury sidelined him for the Packers' Week 3 victory against the Cincinnati Bengals. On September 28, 2017, Brice recorded four combined tackles, broke up pass, and made his first career interception in the Packers' 35–14 win against the Chicago Bears in Week 4. Brice made his first career interception off a pass attempt by Bears' quarterback Mike Glennon, that was originally intended for wide receiver Deonte Thompson, during the third quarter. Brice sustained a sprained ankle during the game and was carted off the field in the second quarter. On October 27, 2017, he was fined $18,231 for a horse-collar tackle he made against the New Orleans Saints. On November 3, 2017, the Packers officially placed Brice on injured reserve after he was unable to fully recover from ankle injury. Brice was initially diagnosed with a sprained ankle, but discovered he had actually torn his deltoid ligament in his ankle which required ankle reconstruction injury he successfully underwent in November. He finished the 2017 NFL season with 23 combined tackles (19 solo), three pass deflections, and an interception in six games and three starts.

==== 2018 ====
On January 1, 2018, the Packers announced their decision to fire defensive coordinator Dom Capers. On January 10, the Packers announced their decision to hire former Cleveland Browns head coach Mike Pettine as their new defensive coordinator. During training camp, Brice competed to be the starting strong safety against Jones after it was left vacant by the departure of Burnett in free agency. McCarthy named Brice and Ha Ha Clinton-Dix the starting safeties to begin the regular season in 2018. They started alongside cornerbacks Tramon Williams and Kevin King.

He started in the Packers' season-opener against the Bears and recorded nine combined tackles and made his first career sack on Bears' quarterback Mitchell Trubisky in the first quarter of their 24–23 victory. Brice appeared in 14 games and started 10 of them. On December 1, 2018, he was fined $26,739 for lowering his head to tackle Dalvin Cook, which led to him being injured. He finished the season with 50 tackles (40 solo), a sack and two pass deflections. However, his 2018 season was a disappointment, as he missed 12 of his 57 total tackle attempts on the season and allowed a passer rating of 150.1 on 29 throws into his primary coverage.

On February 28, 2019, Brice expressed interest in returning to the Packers and receiving a contract extension. However, on March 13, 2019, the Packers declined a tender for Brice, making him an unrestricted free agent.

=== Tampa Bay Buccaneers ===
On March 18, 2019, Brice signed a one-year deal with the Buccaneers. On August 31, Brice was released by the Buccaneers.

=== Seattle Dragons ===
In October 2019, Brice was selected by the Seattle Dragons of the XFL in the 2020 XFL draft. He was released during mini-camp in December 2019.

=== Chicago Bears ===
On January 8, 2020, Brice signed a reserve/future contract with the Chicago Bears. He was waived by the Bears on July 26.

=== Arizona Cardinals ===
On August 5, 2020, Brice signed with the Arizona Cardinals. On September 5, he was waived during final roster cuts. Brice was re-signed to the practice squad a day later. He was placed on the practice squad/injured list on September 14, and activated on October 7. Brice was released by Arizona on October 20.

=== Saskatchewan Roughriders ===
Brice signed with the Saskatchewan Roughriders of the Canadian Football League on March 1, 2021.

=== DC Defenders ===
On November 17, 2022, Brice was selected by the DC Defenders of the XFL. He was waived by the Defenders on March 21, 2024. Brice re-signed with the team on May 1.

== NFL career statistics ==
Regular season statistics
Year	Team	GP	GS	Tackles					Interceptions						Fumbles		
Year	Team	GP	GS	Comb	Solo	Ast	Sack	Safety	PD	Int	Yds	Lng	TDs	FF	FR	Yds	TD
2016	GB	16	1	26	22	4	0.0	0	1	0	0	0	0	0	1	0	0
2017	GB	6	3	23	19	4	0.0	0	3	1	11	11	0	0	0	0	0
2018	GB	14	10	49	39	10	1.0	0	2	0	0	0	0	0	0	0	0
Total		36	14	98	80	18	1.0	0	6	1	11	11	0	0	1	0	0
Source: NFL.com

Postseason statistics
Year	Team	GP	GS	Tackles					Interceptions						Fumbles		
Year	Team	GP	GS	Comb	Solo	Ast	Sack	Safety	PD	Int	Yds	Lng	TDs	FF	FR	Yds	TD
2016	GB	3	0	7	7	0	0.0	0	1	0	0	0	0	0	0	0	0
Total		3	0	7	7	0	0.0	0	1	0	0	0	0	0	0	0	0
Source: pro-football-reference.com
