= James Crawford (American football) =

American football player (born 1994)

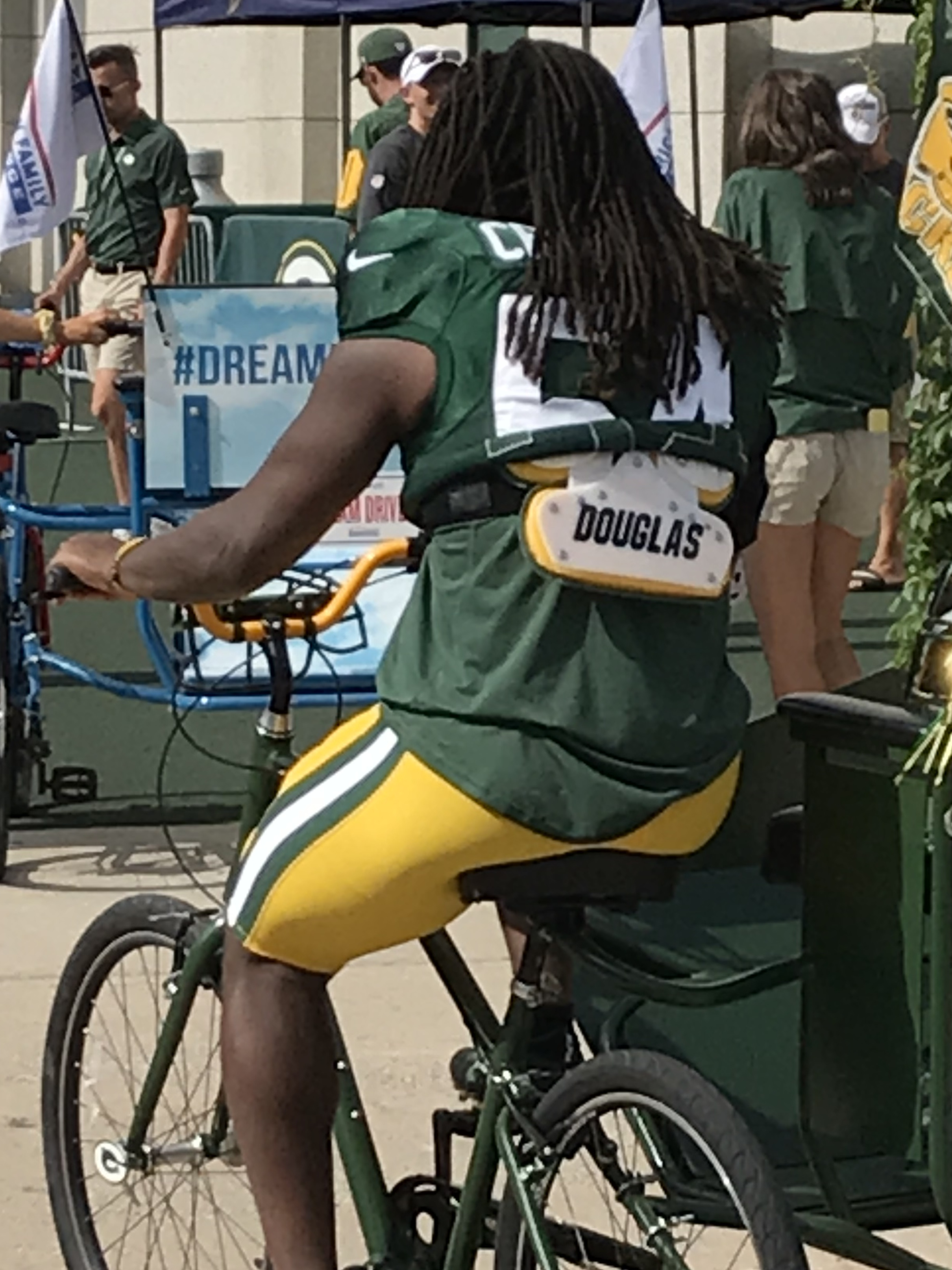
- Crawford with the Green Bay Packers in 2019

No. 54, 51
- Position: Defensive end

Personal information
- Born: December 2, 1994 (age 31); Deerfield Beach, Florida, U.S.
- Listed height: 6 ft 2 in (1.88 m)
- Listed weight: 239 lb (108 kg)

Career information
- High school: St. Thomas Aquinas (Fort Lauderdale, Florida)
- College: Illinois
- NFL draft: 2018: undrafted

Career history
- Green Bay Packers (2018); Miami Dolphins (2019); Baltimore Ravens (2020)*; Philadelphia Stars (2022)
- * Offseason or practice squad member only

Career NFL statistics
- Total tackles: 10
- Stats at Pro Football Reference

James Crawford (born December 2, 1994) is an American former professional football player who was a defensive end in the National Football League (NFL). He played college football for the Illinois Fighting Illini, and signed with the Green Bay Packers as an undrafted free agent in the 2018 NFL season before being waived. The Miami Dolphins signed Crawford for the 2019 NFL season, but released him before the 2020 NFL season after an injury-shortened tenure. The Baltimore Ravens signed Crawford to their practice squad in December 2020, and released him in January 2021.

== College career ==
After redshirting his freshman season, Crawford played four seasons for the Fighting Illini. Crawford recorded starts on all three levels of the defense throughout his college career. He played safety, linebacker and defensive end over the course of four years. He recorded 80 tackles, 10.5 tackles for a loss, four sacks, four forced fumbles, three fumble recoveries and six passes defensed over the course of his college career. Crawford who won team MVP, served as a team captain as a senior and was named All-Big Ten honorable mention by the coaches.

== Professional career ==
=== Green Bay Packers ===
Crawford, signed with the Green Bay Packers as an undrafted free agent on August 8, 2018. He made the Packers 53-man roster out of training camp after originally entering as a long shot to make the team, in part because he did not join the team until ten days after camp began. Crawford made his NFL debut during the Packers season opener against the Chicago Bears. Crawford was named the Packers' captain on special teams three times, including the team's final game of the season against the Detroit Lions. Crawford played in all 16 of the Packers games during his rookie season, making nine tackles and recovering a fumble. After initially making the 53 man roster out of training camp, Crawford was waived by the Packers on September 2, 2019.

=== Miami Dolphins ===
Crawford was claimed off waivers by the Miami Dolphins on September 3, 2019. He was placed on injured reserve on September 26, 2019 after playing in three games, making one tackle.

Crawford was waived on August 31, 2020.

=== Baltimore Ravens ===
On December 23, 2020, Crawford signed with the practice squad of the Baltimore Ravens, and was released on January 5, 2021.

=== Philadelphia Stars ===
Crawford joined the practice squad of the Philadelphia Stars, playing in the United States Football League, on April 16, 2022. He was transferred to the active roster on April 22.

=== Personal life ===
According to Crawford, he works in the dispensary and brewery businesses now.

== NFL career statistics ==
Regular season statistics
Year	Team	GP	GS	Tackles					Interceptions						Fumbles	
Year	Team	GP	GS	Comb	Solo	Ast	Sck	Sfty	PD	Int	Yds	Avg	Lng	TD	FF	FR
2018	GB	16	0	9	8	2	0	0	0	0	0	0	0	0	0	1
Total		16	0	9	8	1	0	0	0	0	0	0	0	0	0	1
Source: NFL.com
