= Fadol Brown =

American football player (born 1993)

Profile
- Position: Defensive end

Personal information
- Born: April 15, 1993 (age 33); Charleston, South Carolina, U.S.
- Listed height: 6 ft 4 in (1.93 m)
- Listed weight: 282 lb (128 kg)

Career information
- High school: Burke (Charleston, South Carolina)
- College: Ole Miss
- NFL draft: 2017: undrafted

Career history
- Oakland Raiders (2017–2018); Green Bay Packers (2018–2019); Chicago Bears (2019)*; DC Defenders (2023–2024); Houston Roughnecks (2025)*
- * Offseason or practice squad member only

Career NFL statistics
- Total tackles: 20
- Pass deflections: 1
- Stats at Pro Football Reference

Fadol Brown (born April 15, 1993) is an American professional football defensive end. He signed with the Oakland Raiders as an undrafted free agent in 2017. He also played for the Green Bay Packers.

== Professional career ==
=== Oakland Raiders ===
Brown signed with the Oakland Raiders as an undrafted free agent on May 5, 2017. He was waived on September 2, 2017 and was signed to the Raiders' practice squad the next day. He signed a reserve/future contract with the Raiders on January 2, 2018.

In 2018, Brown played in eight games before being waived on December 4, 2018.

=== Green Bay Packers ===
On December 5, 2018, Brown was claimed off waivers by the Green Bay Packers. He was re-signed on March 6, 2019. He was waived on October 5, 2019.

=== Chicago Bears ===
On October 15, 2019, Brown was signed to the Chicago Bears' practice squad. He was placed on the practice squad/injured list on October 29. His practice squad contract with the team expired on January 6, 2020.

=== DC Defenders ===
On November 17, 2022, Brown was drafted by the DC Defenders of the XFL. He was placed on the team's reserve list on March 16, 2023, and activated on March 20. He was waived on March 2, 2024. He was re-signed on December 19, 2024. He was released on March 15.

=== Houston Roughnecks ===
On March 18, 2025, Brown signed with Houston Roughnecks of the United Football League (UFL). He was released on March 20, 2025.

== NFL career statistics ==
Regular season statistics
Season	Team	Games		Tackles				
Season	Team	GP	GS	Total	Solo	Ast	Sck	Int
2018	OAK	8	0	17	14	3	0.0	0
2018	GB	4	0	3	2	1	0.0	0
2019	GB	4	0	0	0	0	0.0	0
Total		16	0	20	16	4	0.0	0
Source: NFL.com
