= Kevin Rader (American football) =

American football player (born 1995)

Profile
- Position: Tight end

Personal information
- Born: April 26, 1995 (age 31); Pittsburgh, Pennsylvania, U.S.
- Listed height: 6 ft 4 in (1.93 m)
- Listed weight: 250 lb (113 kg)

Career information
- High school: Pine-Richland (Gibsonia, Pennsylvania)
- College: Youngstown State
- NFL draft: 2018: undrafted

Career history
- Green Bay Packers (2018)*; Pittsburgh Steelers (2019–2021); Tennessee Titans (2022–2023); New Orleans Saints (2024)*
- * Offseason or practice squad member only

Career NFL statistics as of 2023
- Receptions: 3
- Receiving yards: 14
- Stats at Pro Football Reference

Kevin Charles Rader (born April 26, 1995) is an American professional football tight end. He played college football at Youngstown State.

== Professional career ==
Pre-draft measurables
| Height | Weight | Arm length | Hand span | 40-yard dash | 10-yard split | 20-yard split | 20-yard shuttle | Three-cone drill | Vertical jump | Broad jump | Bench press |
|---|---|---|---|---|---|---|---|---|---|---|---|
| 6 ft 3 7/8 in (1.93 m) | 250 lb (113 kg) | 32 1/2 in (0.83 m) | 9 5/8 in (0.24 m) | 4.92 s | 1.73 s | 2.94 s | 4.46 s | 7.07 s | 34.0 in (0.86 m) | 9 ft 4 in (2.84 m) | 17 reps |
All values from Pro Day

=== Green Bay Packers ===
Rader was signed by the Green Bay Packers as an undrafted free agent following the 2018 NFL draft on May 4, 2018. He was waived on August 31, 2018, during final roster cuts.

=== Pittsburgh Steelers ===
Rader was signed by the Pittsburgh Steelers to a reserve/futures contract on January 9, 2019. He was waived at the end of training camp, but was signed to the Steelers' practice squad on September 1, 2019. He was released from the practice squad twice during the 2019 season, but was re-signed shortly afterwards both times. Rader signed a reserve/futures contract with the team on December 30, 2019.

Rader was waived during final roster cuts again on September 5, 2020, and re-signed to the team's practice squad the next day. He was signed to the active roster on November 24, 2020. He was waived on December 21, and re-signed to the practice squad two days later. He was elevated to the active roster on January 2 and January 9, 2021, for the team's week 17 and wild card playoff games, each against the Cleveland Browns, and reverted to the practice squad after each game. He made his NFL debut in week 17. On January 14, 2021, Rader signed a reserve/futures contract with the Steelers.

On August 31, 2021, Rader was waived by the Steelers as part of final roster cuts and re-signed to the practice squad the next day. He was promoted to the active roster on November 23, 2021.

On August 30, 2022, Rader was waived by the Steelers.

=== Tennessee Titans ===
On September 1, 2022, Rader was signed to the Tennessee Titans practice squad. He was promoted to the active roster on September 22.

On August 29, 2023, Rader was waived by the Titans and re-signed to the practice squad. He was promoted to the active roster on October 4.

=== New Orleans Saints ===
On August 3, 2024, Rader signed with the New Orleans Saints. He was placed on injured reserve on August 27, and released on September 2.
