= Bronson Hill =

American football player (born 1993)

No. 34, 48, 36
- Position: Running back

Personal information
- Born: January 2, 1993 (age 33); Grand Rapids, Michigan
- Listed height: 5 ft 11 in (1.80 m)
- Listed weight: 221 lb (100 kg)

Career information
- High school: Grand Rapids (MI) Catholic Central
- College: Eastern Michigan
- NFL draft: 2015: undrafted

Career history
- Buffalo Bills (2015)*; Chicago Bears (2015)*; Miami Dolphins (2015)*; New Orleans Saints (2015)*; Cincinnati Bengals (2016)*; Jacksonville Jaguars (2016); Minnesota Vikings (2017)*; Arizona Cardinals (2017); Green Bay Packers (2018)*; Arizona Hotshots (2019)*; Atlanta Legends (2019)
- * Offseason or practice squad member only
- Stats at Pro Football Reference

Bronson Hill (born January 2, 1993) is an American former football running back. He played college football at Eastern Michigan University, where he was also a sprinter on the track team. He was signed by the Buffalo Bills as an undrafted free agent in 2015 and was also a member of the Chicago Bears, Miami Dolphins, Cincinnati Bengals, Jacksonville Jaguars, Minnesota Vikings, and Arizona Cardinals. He later had a brief stint in the Alliance of American Football before retiring from professional football.

== College career ==
Hill played college football at Eastern Michigan University from 2011 to 2014. He also competed as a sprinter on the track and field team, specializing in the 60-meter dash.

In 2012, Hill led the team with 905 rushing yards and scored seven touchdowns. His 283-yard, four-touchdown performance against Toledo earned him MAC West Division Offensive Player of the Week and National Running Back of the Week honors. He was named the team’s James M. "Bingo" Brown Most Valuable Offensive Player that season.

In 2013, Hill rushed for 1,101 yards and five touchdowns, earning Third-Team All-MAC honors. He surpassed 100 rushing yards in six games that season, including a career-high 257-yard game against Ohio.

In track, he recorded a personal-best 6.95 seconds in the 60-meter dash and placed ninth at the 2013 MAC Indoor Championships.

In 2020, Hill was inducted into Eastern Michigan’s Football Ring of Honor, recognizing his standout career with the Eagles.

== Professional career ==
=== 2015 season ===
In 2015, Hill was signed by the Buffalo Bills as an undrafted free agent. In his first four preseason games there, he led his team in rushing attempts and was second on his team in rushing yards (92 yards). He was waived during final roster cuts.

Throughout the regular season, Hill was on the practice squads of the Chicago Bears, Miami Dolphins, and the New Orleans Saints.

=== Cincinnati Bengals ===
On February 2, 2016, Hill signed a reserve/future contract with the Cincinnati Bengals. During the preseason, he rushed for a total of 18 yards. On September 3, 2016, he was waived by the team.

=== Jacksonville Jaguars ===
On September 5, 2016, Hill was signed to the Jacksonville Jaguars' practice squad. He was promoted to the Jaguars' active roster on December 10, 2016.

On May 1, 2017, Hill was released by the Jaguars.

=== Minnesota Vikings ===
On August 12, 2017, Hill signed with the Minnesota Vikings. He was waived on September 2, 2017, and was signed to the Vikings' practice squad the next day. He was released on November 7, 2017.

=== Arizona Cardinals ===
On November 20, 2017, Hill was signed to the Arizona Cardinals' practice squad. He was promoted to the active roster on November 28, 2017. On December 16, 2017, Hill was waived by the Cardinals, but was re-signed three days later. He was released by the Cardinals on May 10, 2018.

=== Green Bay Packers ===
On August 19, 2018, Hill signed with the Green Bay Packers. He was waived on September 1, 2018.

=== Alliance of American Football ===
In 2018, Hill signed with the Arizona Hotshots of the Alliance of American Football for the 2019 season. He later joined the Atlanta Legends, but failed to make the final roster. He was placed on injured reserve after clearing waivers. The league ceased operations in April 2019.

== Career statistics ==
Season	Team	Games		Rushing					Receiving					Fumbles	
Season	Team	GP	GS	Att	Yds	Avg	Lng	TD	Rec	Yds	Avg	Lng	TD	FUM	Lost
2016	JAX	3	0	2	11	5.5	7	0	0	0	0.0	0	0	0	0
2017	ARI	2	0	1	−2	−2.0	−2	0	0	0	0.0	0	0	0	0
Career		5	0	3	9	3.0	7	0	0	0	0.0	0	0	0	0
Source: ESPN.com

== Post-football career ==
After his football career, Hill transitioned into creative work and personal development. In 2022, he produced the short documentary Fly, Black Boy, which explores themes of identity, perseverance, motivation and self-discovery. The film is listed on IMDb and received the Best Sound Editing award at the IndieX Film Festival.
