= Jeff Blasko =

American football player and coach (born 1984)

Cleveland Browns
- Title: Run game coordinator/tight ends coach

Personal information
- Born: July 6, 1983 (age 43); Pittsburgh, Pennsylvania, U.S.

Career information
- High school: Steel Valley Senior High School
- College: Robert Morris

Career history
- Steel Valley Senior High School (2002–2005) Offensive assistant; Bethel Park High School (2006–2007) Offensive assistant; Akron (2008–2010) Graduate assistant; Florida (2011) Offensive quality control coach; Kansas (2012–2014) Tight ends coach; Penn (2015) Tight ends coach; Green Bay Packers (2016–2018); Coaching administrator (2016); Assistant offensive line coach (2017-2018); Cleveland Browns (2019) Assistant offensive line coach; Dallas Cowboys (2020–2024); Assistant offensive line coach (2020-2022); Running backs coach & run game coordinator (2023-2024); New York Jets (2025) Tight ends coach; Cleveland Browns (2026–present) Run game coordinator/tight ends coach

Jeff Blasko (born July 6, 1983) is an American professional football coach who is currently the run game coordinator and tight ends coach for the Cleveland Browns of the National Football League (NFL). He previously served as a coach for the New York Jets, Dallas Cowboys, Green Bay Packers, along with several college and high school teams.

== Early life and education ==
Blasko was born on July 6, 1983, in Pittsburgh, Pennsylvania. He attended Robert Morris University, where he earned a bachelor's degree in information sciences in 2005. He later received a master's degree in sports administration from the University of Akron in 2009.

== Coaching career ==
=== High school and college ===
Blasko began his coaching career at the high school level in Pennsylvania, serving as an offensive assistant at Steel Valley High School in Munhall from 2002 to 2005 and at Bethel Park High School from 2006 to 2007.

He moved into the college ranks as a graduate assistant at the University of Akron from 2008 to 2010. In 2011, he served as an offensive quality control coach at the University of Florida. He later coached tight ends at the University of Kansas from 2012 to 2014 and at the University of Pennsylvania in 2015.

=== NFL ===
Blasko entered the NFL in 2016 with the Green Bay Packers as a coaching administrator before being promoted to assistant offensive line coach, a role he held through 2018.

In 2019, Blasko joined the Cleveland Browns as assistant offensive line coach.

Blasko joined the Dallas Cowboys in 2020 as assistant offensive line coach, serving in that role through 2022. He was promoted to run game coordinator and running backs coach for the 2023 and 2024 seasons.

In 2025, Blasko was named tight ends coach of the New York Jets.

On February 1, 2026, it was reported that Blasko would become the new tight ends coach and run game coordinator for the Cleveland Browns.

== Personal life ==
Blasko is married to his wife, Katie, and they have two sons.
