= David Raih =

American football coach (born 1980)

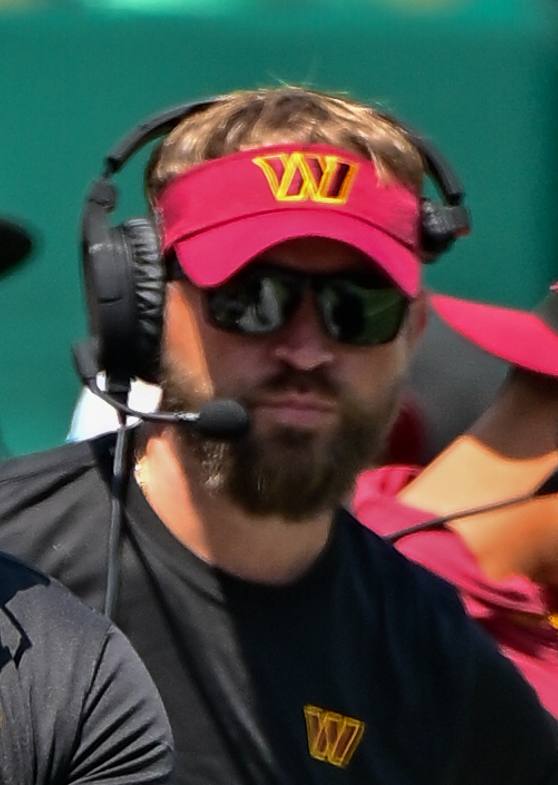
- Raih with the Washington Commanders in 2024

Washington Commanders
- Title: Offensive pass game coordinator

Personal information
- Born: September 9, 1980 (age 46); Edina, Minnesota, U.S.
- Listed height: 6 ft 5 in (1.96 m)
- Listed weight: 197 lb (89 kg)

Career information
- Position: Quarterback
- High school: Saint Thomas Academy (Mendota Heights, Minnesota)
- College: Iowa (1999–2002)

Career history
- UCLA Bruins (2008–2009) Intern; Iowa Hawkeyes (2010–2012) Graduate assistant; Texas Tech Red Raiders (2013) Assistant quarterbacks coach & outside receivers coach; Green Bay Packers (2014–2018); Coaching administrator (2014–2015); Assistant offensive line coach (2016); Offensive perimeter coach (2017); Wide receivers coach (2018); Arizona Cardinals (2019–2020) Wide receivers coach; Vanderbilt Commodores (2021) Offensive coordinator & wide receivers coach; Tampa Bay Buccaneers (2023) Senior offensive analyst; Washington Commanders (2024–present); Tight ends coach (2024–2025); Offensive pass game coordinator (2026–present)

David Raih (pronounced RYE; born September 9, 1980) is an American professional football coach who is the offensive pass game coordinator for the Washington Commanders of the National Football League (NFL). He played college football as a quarterback for the Iowa Hawkeyes. Raih entered coaching as an intern at UCLA in 2008 and has also coached with the Hawkeyes, Texas Tech Red Raiders, and Vanderbilt Commodores of the NCAA and the NFL's Green Bay Packers, Arizona Cardinals, and Tampa Bay Buccaneers.

== Early life ==
Raih was born on September 9, 1980, in Edina, Minnesota, later attending Saint Thomas Academy in Mendota Heights, Minnesota. Raih was a three-sport athlete in football, basketball and track. In his junior year, his team won the Minnesota state basketball championship. He also quarterbacked his team to the Minnesota state semifinals in football in both his junior and senior years.

Raih played college football as a quarterback for the Hawkeyes at the University of Iowa, winning the Big Ten Conference title in 2002 and a berth in the 2003 Orange Bowl. His playing career was limited due to injury, with surgery performed on his throwing arm in 1999 and 2002. From 2004 to 2007, Raih was a sales representative a manufacturer of orthopedic devices.

== Coaching career ==
=== UCLA ===
Raih's coaching career started at UCLA, where he spent two years as an intern (2008–09) working with the quarterbacks under head coach Rick Neuheisel. Raih left his six-figure salary job at Zimmer Inc. to become an unpaid intern for the UCLA.

=== Iowa ===
Raih spent three seasons as a graduate assistant coach at his alma mater, the University of Iowa, where he assisted with tight ends (2012) and the offensive line (2010–2011).

=== Texas Tech ===
In 2013 Raih joined Texas Tech as the director of high school relations, in addition to assisting with quarterbacks under head coach Kliff Kingsbury Raih was promoted to outside receivers coach going into the 2013 Holiday Bowl.

=== Green Bay Packers ===
Raih spent five seasons with the Packers, most recently working as the wide receivers coach after being promoted on January 24, 2018. He previously served as offensive perimeter coach, following a promotion on February 27, 2017, and was earlier named assistant offensive line coach on February 17, 2016. He was hired on February 7, 2014, and spent his first two years as the team's coaching administrator.

=== Arizona Cardinals ===
On January 13, 2019, Raih was hired by the Arizona Cardinals as their wide receivers coach, reuniting with head coach Kliff Kingsbury.

=== Vanderbilt ===
On February 2, 2021, Raih was hired as the offensive coordinator and wide receivers coach at Vanderbilt University under head coach Clark Lea. He resigned after the season.

=== Tampa Bay Buccaneers ===
In 2023, Raih was hired by the Tampa Bay Buccaneers as a senior offensive analyst.

=== Washington Commanders ===
On February 15, 2024, Raih was hired by the Washington Commanders as their tight ends coach under head coach Dan Quinn. He was promoted to offensive pass game coordinator in March 2026.

== Personal life ==
Raih married Lauren Wirkus in Santa Monica, California, in June 2020.
