= Jermaine Whitehead =

American football player (born 1993)

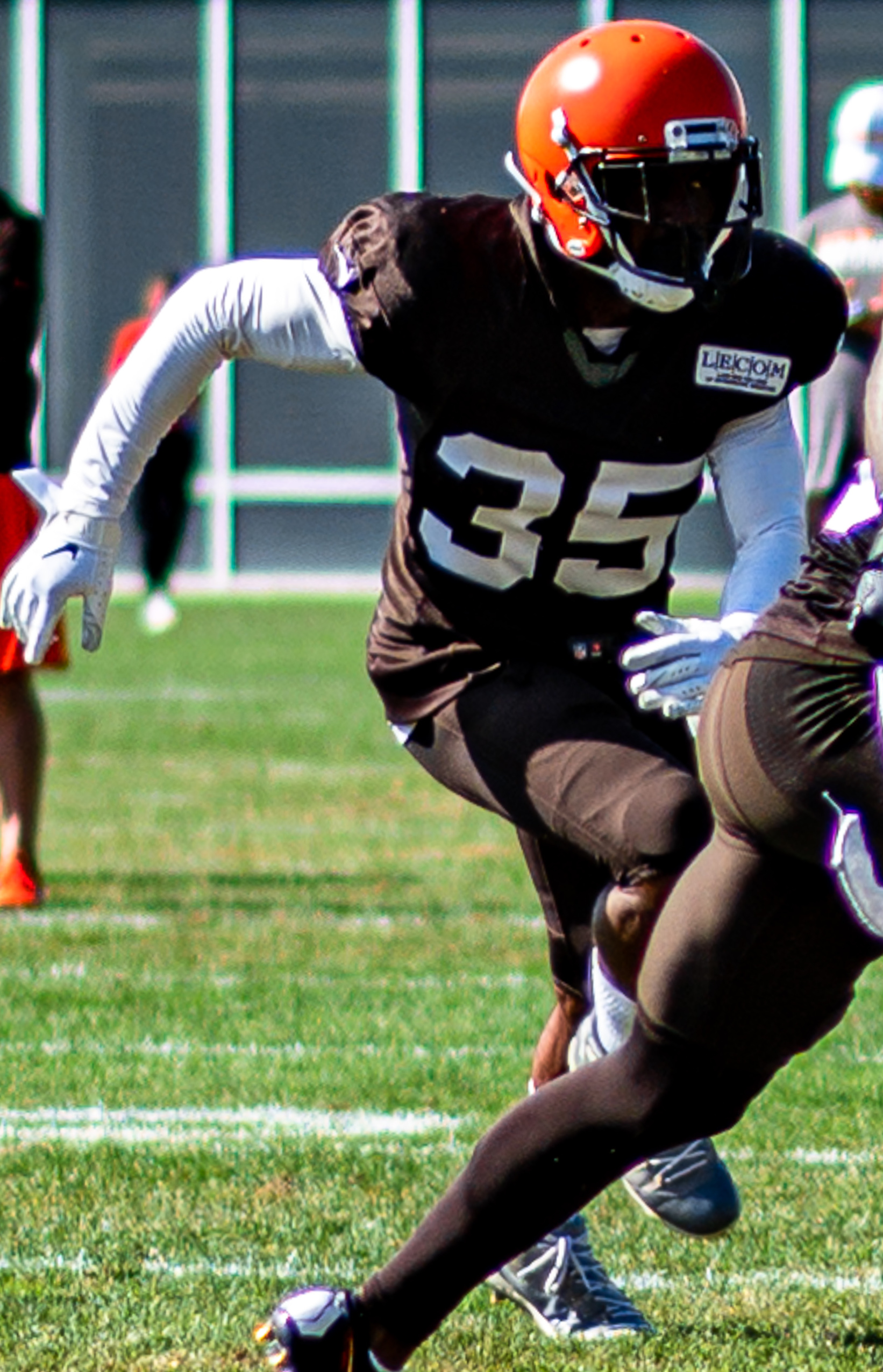
- Whitehead with the Cleveland Browns in 2019

No. 35
- Position: Safety

Personal information
- Born: March 12, 1993 (age 33); Greenwood, Mississippi, U.S.
- Listed height: 5 ft 11 in (1.80 m)
- Listed weight: 195 lb (88 kg)

Career information
- High school: Amanda Elzy (Greenwood)
- College: Auburn
- NFL draft: 2015: undrafted

Career history
- San Francisco 49ers (2015)*; Baltimore Ravens (2015); Green Bay Packers (2016–2018); Cleveland Browns (2018–2019)
- * Offseason or practice squad member only

Career NFL statistics
- Total tackles: 76
- Sacks: 1
- Forced fumbles: 1
- Pass deflections: 5
- Interceptions: 1
- Stats at Pro Football Reference

Jermaine Rasheed Whitehead (born March 12, 1993) is an American former professional football player who was a safety in the National Football League (NFL). He played college football for the Auburn Tigers, and was signed by the San Francisco 49ers as an undrafted free agent in 2015. He was also a member of the Baltimore Ravens, Green Bay Packers, Cleveland Browns and San Francisco 49ers

== Early life ==
Whitehead was born in Greenwood, Mississippi to Teveeta Whitehead and Frank Ellis. Whitehead attended Amanda Elzy High School where he played cornerback and quarterback with the Panthers football team. After a productive season in 2009 as quarterback saw Whitehead earn District 3 (4A) Player of the Year, he went on to play his junior and senior seasons as a cornerback. Whitehead's defensive performances earned him numerous regional, state and All-American honors from ESPN.com, Rivals.com and Scout.com. He was rated a four-star recruit by 247Sports and Rivals.com. By his senior season, Whitehead held a 3.71 GPA. Whitehead received offers from Tennessee, Mississippi, Mississippi State and Auburn.

== College career ==
Whitehead attended Auburn University, where he played on the Auburn Tigers football team from 2011 to 2014. He finished his college career with totals of 218 tackles, nine interceptions for 82 yards and two touchdowns, and 15 pass breakups.

He graduated in 2014 with a bachelor's degree in accounting.

== Professional career ==
External videos
- Whitehead's NFL Combine workout

Pre-draft measurables
| Height | Weight | Arm length | Hand span | Wingspan | 40-yard dash | 10-yard split | 20-yard split | 20-yard shuttle | Three-cone drill | Vertical jump | Broad jump | Bench press |
|---|---|---|---|---|---|---|---|---|---|---|---|---|
| 5 ft 11 in (1.80 m) | 197 lb (89 kg) | 31 in (0.79 m) | 9 3/8 in (0.24 m) | 6 ft 2 1/8 in (1.88 m) | 4.50 s | 1.65 s | 2.65 s | 4.11 s | 6.95 s | 37.0 in (0.94 m) | 10 ft 8 in (3.25 m) | 15 reps |
All values from NFL Combine/Pro Day

=== San Francisco 49ers ===
After going undrafted in the 2015 NFL draft, Whitehead signed with the San Francisco 49ers on May 5, 2015. On September 5, he was released by the 49ers during final team cuts. Whitehead was re-signed to the 49ers' practice squad the following day.

=== Baltimore Ravens ===
On December 23, 2015, the Baltimore Ravens signed Whitehead off the 49ers' practice squad. He was inactive for the last two games of the season. On April 19, 2016, Whitehead was re-signed by the Ravens. He was released by the Ravens on May 13.

=== Green Bay Packers ===
Whitehead was signed by the Green Bay Packers on May 18, 2016. On September 3, he was released by the Packers during final team cuts and was re-signed to the practice squad the next day. On October 24, he was promoted from the practice squad to the active roster. Whitehead made his NFL debut against the Atlanta Falcons in Week 8. On November 7, he was released by the Packers and was re-signed back to the practice squad. He signed a futures contract with the Packers on January 24, 2017.

On September 2, 2017, Whitehead was waived by the Packers and was signed to the practice squad the next day. He was promoted to the active roster on October 21.

Whitehead was re-signed on March 14, 2018. In Week 9 against the New England Patriots, Whitehead was ejected after slapping center David Andrews in the face mask. He was then released by the Packers on November 6.

=== Cleveland Browns ===
On November 7, 2018, Whitehead was claimed off waivers by the Cleveland Browns. On September 29, 2019, he had his first NFL career interception and forced fumble in a game against the Baltimore Ravens. Whitehead was waived on November 4, after posting "several threatening and racist messages for people who criticized him" following the team's loss to the Denver Broncos, a game in which he missed a number of crucial tackles. Whitehead later apologized for the messages.

== Career statistics ==
=== NFL ===
Regular season statistics
| Year | Team | GP | GS | Tackles | | | | | Interceptions | | | | | | Fumbles | | |
| Year | Team | GP | GS | Comb | Solo | Ast | Sack | Safety | PD | Int | Yds | Lng | TDs | FF | FR | Yds | TD |
|---|---|---|---|---|---|---|---|---|---|---|---|---|---|---|---|---|---|
| 2016 | GB | 2 | 0 | 0 | 0 | 0 | 0.0 | 0 | 0 | 0 | 0 | 0 | 0 | 0 | 0 | 0 | 0 |
| 2017 | GB | 10 | 0 | 11 | 8 | 3 | 0.0 | 0 | 1 | 0 | 0 | 0 | 0 | 0 | 0 | 0 | 0 |
| 2018 | GB | 7 | 2 | 20 | 18 | 2 | 1.0 | 0 | 2 | 0 | 0 | 0 | 0 | 0 | 0 | 0 | 0 |
| 2018 | CLE | 7 | 0 | 4 | 1 | 3 | 0.0 | 0 | 0 | 0 | 0 | 0 | 0 | 0 | 0 | 0 | 0 |
| 2019 | CLE | 8 | 8 | 41 | 31 | 10 | 0.0 | 0 | 2 | 1 | 0 | 0 | 0 | 1 | 0 | 0 | 0 |
| Total | | 34 | 10 | 76 | 58 | 18 | 1.0 | 0 | 5 | 1 | 0 | 0 | 0 | 1 | 0 | 0 | 0 |
Source: NFL.com

=== College ===
| Year | Team | Games | | Tackles | | | | Interceptions | | | | | | Fumbles | |
| Year | Team | G | GS | Total | Solo | Ast | Sck | PDef | Int | Yds | Avg | Lng | TDs | FF | FR |
|---|---|---|---|---|---|---|---|---|---|---|---|---|---|---|---|
| 2011 | Auburn | 13 | 1 | 31 | 22 | 9 | 0.0 | 3 | 1 | 25 | 25.0 | 25 | 1 | 0 | 0 |
| 2012 | Auburn | 12 | 12 | 86 | 40 | 46 | 1.0 | 5 | 0 | 0 | 0.0 | 0 | 0 | 0 | 1 |
| 2013 | Auburn | 14 | 14 | 65 | 44 | 21 | 0.0 | 6 | 2 | 0 | 0.0 | 0 | 0 | 0 | 1 |
| 2014 | Auburn | 9 | 6 | 36 | 27 | 9 | 0.0 | 1 | 6 | 57 | 9.5 | 33 | 1 | 0 | 0 |
| Total | | 48 | 33 | 218 | 133 | 85 | 1.0 | 15 | 9 | 82 | 9.1 | 33 | 2 | 0 | 2 |
Source: AuburnTigers.com

== Retirement ==
After his final NFL season, Whitehead began a career in finances including jobs in payroll and financial management. From 2020 to 2021, Whitehead attended Syracuse University, graduating with a Master's Degree in accounting. Since 2022, he has worked as a senior staff accountant for Vertical Communication based in Atlanta, Georgia.
