= Ethan Cooper =

American football player (born 1995)

Profile
- Position: Offensive guard

Personal information
- Born: June 11, 1995 (age 31); Steelton, Pennsylvania, U.S.
- Listed height: 6 ft 2 in (1.88 m)
- Listed weight: 322 lb (146 kg)

Career information
- High school: Central Dauphin East
- College: IUP
- NFL draft: 2017: undrafted

Career history
- Pittsburgh Steelers (2017)*; New York Giants (2017–2018)*; Green Bay Packers (2018)*; Kansas City Chiefs (2018)*
- * Offseason or practice squad member only

Awards and highlights
- Division II All-American (2016); 2× First-team All-PSAC West (2015, 2016); Second-team All-PSAC West (2014)
- Stats at Pro Football Reference

Ethan Cooper (born June 11, 1995) is an American former professional football guard. He played college football at Indiana University of Pennsylvania. He signed with the Pittsburgh Steelers as an undrafted free agent in 2017.

== Early life ==
Cooper attended Central Dauphin East High School. He grew up a fan of the Philadelphia Eagles.

== College career ==
Cooper attended Indiana University of Pennsylvania and played for the Crimson Hawks football team. He was recruited as a defensive player but was moved to the offensive line as a freshman. Coming into his senior season, Cooper made the switch from left guard to right tackle. After the season he was named a Division II All-American. He finished his career with 37 consecutive starts on the offensive line.

== Professional career ==
Cooper was rated as the 19th-best offensive guard in the 2017 NFL draft by ESPN. Cooper worked out for five NFL teams the Atlanta Falcons, Houston Texans, Jacksonville Jaguars, Philadelphia Eagles and Pittsburgh Steelers. He also attended a pro-day at Temple University. NFL.com projected him to be selected in the sixth or seventh round of the draft, and Cooper was invited to the NFL combine. Despite this, he went undrafted.

Cooper signed with the Pittsburgh Steelers as an undrafted free agent on April 29, 2017. He was waived on September 2, 2017.

On October 11, 2017, Cooper was signed to the New York Giants' practice squad. He signed a reserve/future contract with the Giants on January 1, 2018. He was waived by the Giants on July 12, 2018.

On July 13, 2018, Cooper was claimed off waivers by the Green Bay Packers. He was waived on August 6, 2018.

On August 7, 2018, Cooper was claimed off waivers by the Kansas City Chiefs. He was waived on September 1, 2018.
