= Marwin Evans =

American football player (born 1993)

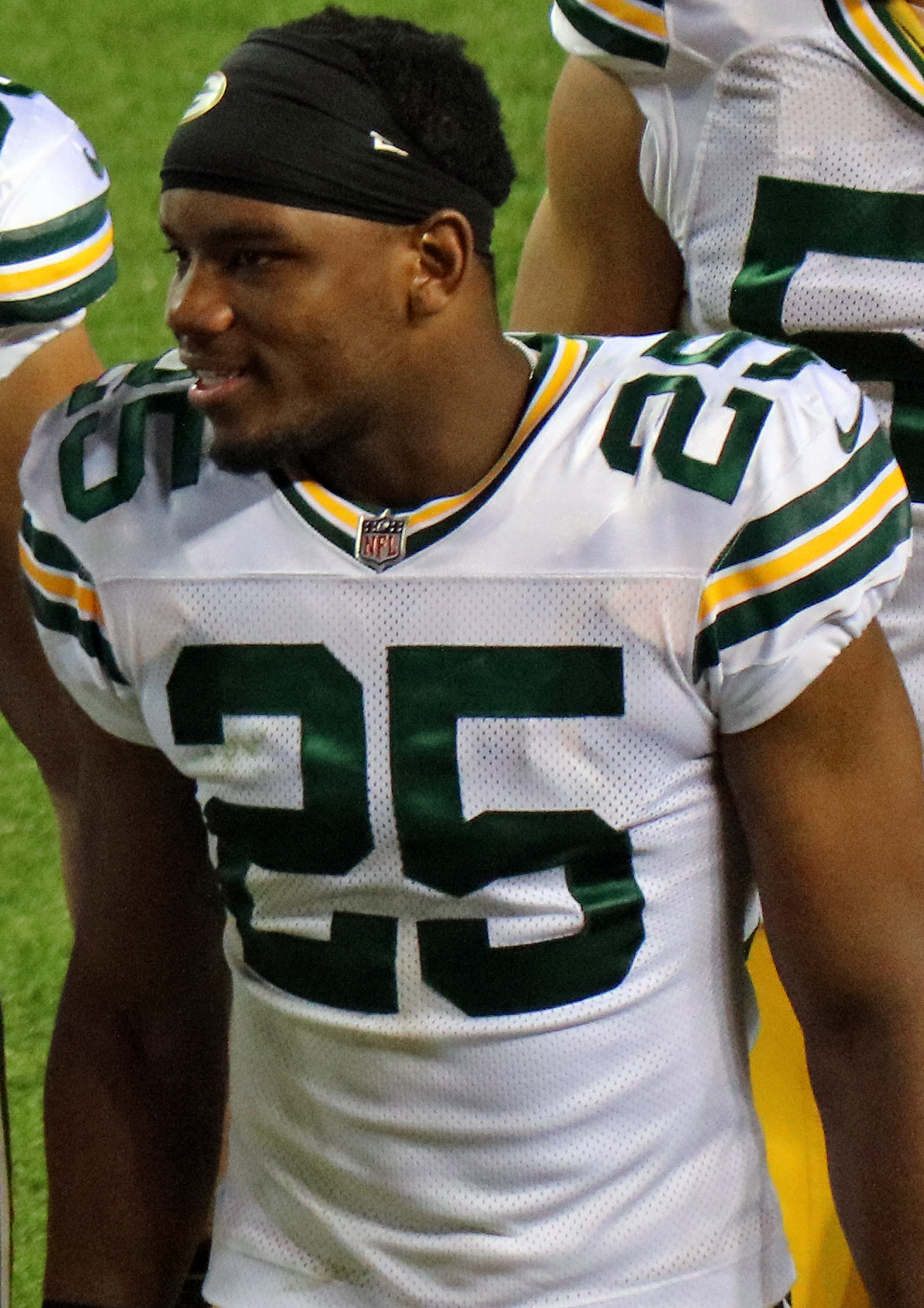
- Evans with the Green Bay Packers in 2017

No. 25
- Position: Safety

Personal information
- Born: April 10, 1993 (age 33); Milwaukee, Wisconsin, U.S.
- Listed height: 5 ft 10 in (1.78 m)
- Listed weight: 211 lb (96 kg)

Career information
- High school: Oak Creek (Oak Creek, Wisconsin)
- College: Utah State
- NFL draft: 2016: undrafted

Career history
- Green Bay Packers (2016–2018); Seattle Seahawks (2018–2019)*; Dallas Renegades (2020)*; Team 9 (2020)*; Dallas Renegades (2020); Winnipeg Blue Bombers (2021–2022); Vegas Vipers (2023)
- * Offseason or practice squad member only

Career NFL statistics
- Total tackles: 29
- Forced fumbles: 1
- Stats at Pro Football Reference

Marwin Evans (born April 10, 1993) is an American former professional football player who was a safety in the National Football League (NFL). After high school, Evans attended Highland Community College in Northeast Kansas before transferring to play college football for the Utah State Aggies.

== Professional career ==
=== Green Bay Packers ===
Evans signed with the Green Bay Packers as an undrafted free agent on May 10, 2016. He played in all 16 games in his rookie season primarily on special teams recording six tackles.

On September 1, 2018, Evans was waived by the Packers and was re-signed to the practice squad. He was released on September 11, 2018.

=== Seattle Seahawks ===
On January 1, 2019, Evans was signed to the Seattle Seahawks practice squad. He signed a reserve/future contract six days after the Seahawks lost to the Dallas Cowboys in the Wild Card Round of the playoffs. He was waived on August 10, 2019.

=== Dallas Renegades and Team 9 ===
On November 22, 2019, Evans was selected by the Dallas Renegades of the XFL in the 2020 XFL Supplemental Draft. He was waived during final roster cuts on January 22, 2020. He was signed to the XFL's practice squad team, referred to as Team 9, on January 30, 2020. He re-signed with the Renegades on March 9, 2020. He had his contract terminated when the league suspended operations on April 10, 2020.

=== Winnipeg Blue Bombers ===
Evans signed with the Winnipeg Blue Bombers of the Canadian Football League on January 30, 2021. He was placed on the suspended list on July 9, 2021.

=== Vegas Vipers ===
The Vegas Vipers of the XFL added Evans through the 2023 XFL draft. The Vipers folded when the XFL and United States Football League merged to create the United Football League (UFL).

== NFL statistics ==
Regular season statistics
Season	Team	Games		Tackles				
Season	Team	GP	GS	Total	Solo	Ast	Sck	Int
2016	GB	16	0	6	5	1	0.0	0
2017	GB	16	1	24	21	3	0.0	0
Total		32	1	30	26	4	0.0	0
Source: NFL.com
