= 2017 Green Bay Packers season =

NFL team season

- Owner: Green Bay Packers, Inc. (360,760 stockholders)
- General manager: Ted Thompson
- Head coach: Mike McCarthy
- Home stadium: Lambeau Field

Results
- Record: 7–9
- Division place: 3rd NFC North
- Playoffs: Did not qualify
- All-Pros: 1: LT David Bakhtiari (2nd team)
- Pro Bowlers: 2: DE Mike Daniels; WR Davante Adams

Uniform
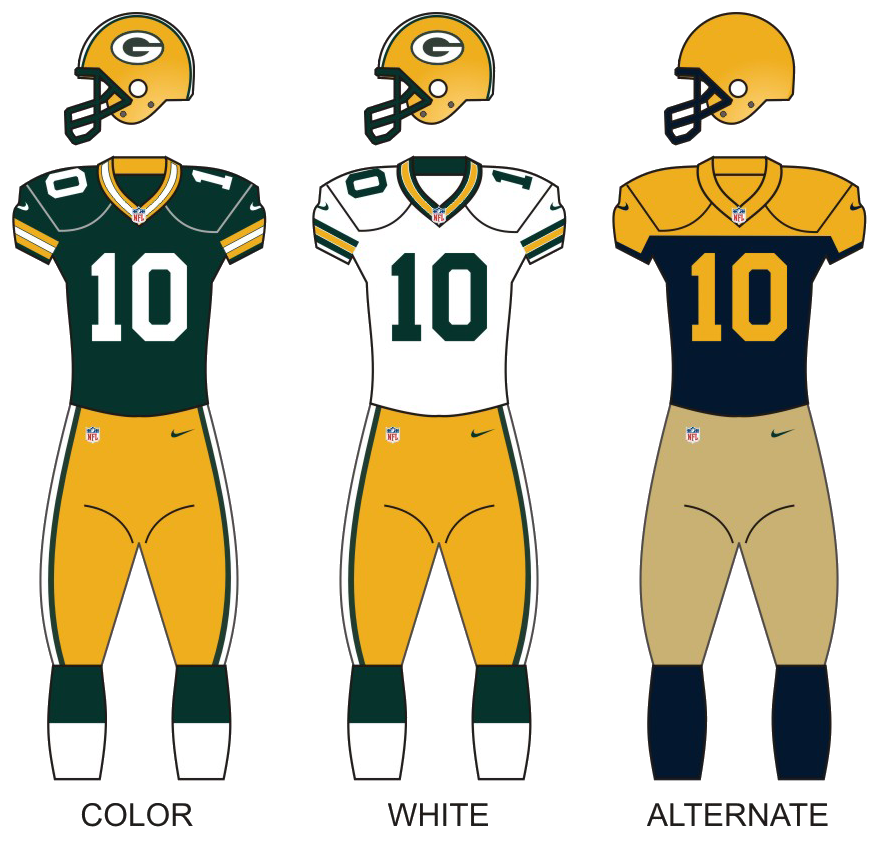

The 2017 season was the Green Bay Packers' 97th season in the National Football League (NFL), their 99th overall and their 12th under head coach Mike McCarthy. After reaching the NFC Championship Game in the previous season, the team attempted to improve on their 10–6 record from 2016. However, the team was eliminated from postseason contention after Week 15, marking the first time since 2008 that they failed to qualify for the playoffs.

The Packers started out strong, compiling a 4–1 record, but during a week 6 game against their division rival Minnesota Vikings, the Packers lost starting quarterback Aaron Rodgers to a collarbone injury and eventually ended with a 7–9 record despite his attempted return in a loss to the Carolina Panthers in Week 15. A blowout 35–11 loss to the Detroit Lions in week 17 secured the Packers’ first losing season since 2008.

== Player movements ==
=== Free agents ===
Position	Player	Free agency tag	Date signed	Team
WR	Geronimo Allison	ERFA	March 6, 2017	Green Bay Packers
G	Don Barclay	UFA	March 10, 2017	Green Bay Packers
TE	Jared Cook	UFA	March 16, 2017	Oakland Raiders
RB	John Crockett	ERFA	July 14, 2017	Oakland Raiders
OLB	Jayrone Elliott	RFA	March 13, 2017	Green Bay Packers
LS	Brett Goode	UFA	August 12, 2017	Green Bay Packers
SS	Micah Hyde	UFA	March 9, 2017	Buffalo Bills
RB	Don Jackson	ERFA	March 8, 2017	Green Bay Packers
OLB	Datone Jones	UFA	March 14, 2017	Minnesota Vikings
FB	Joe Kerridge	ERFA	March 16, 2017	Green Bay Packers
RB	Eddie Lacy	UFA	March 14, 2017	Seattle Seahawks
G	T. J. Lang	UFA	March 12, 2017	Detroit Lions
RB	Christine Michael	UFA	March 23, 2017	Green Bay Packers
OLB	Julius Peppers	UFA	March 10, 2017	Carolina Panthers
OLB	Nick Perry	UFA	March 9, 2017	Green Bay Packers
DE	Christian Ringo	ERFA	March 7, 2017	Green Bay Packers
P	Jake Schum	ERFA	March 8, 2017	Green Bay Packers
LB	Joe Thomas	ERFA	March 7, 2017	Green Bay Packers
C	J. C. Tretter	UFA	March 9, 2017	Cleveland Browns
ILB	Jordan Tripp	RFA	March 15, 2017	Green Bay Packers

Re-signed Signed Away Suspended, Released
RFA: Restricted free agent, UFA: Unrestricted free agent, ERFA: Exclusive rights free agent, FT: Franchise Tag

=== Trades ===
September 3, 2017	To Green Bay Packers Conditional 2018 7th-round pick	To Dallas Cowboys Jayrone Elliott

=== Signings ===
Position	Player	Last Team	Date
TE	Martellus Bennett	New England Patriots	March 10, 2017
TE	Lance Kendricks	Los Angeles Rams	March 11, 2017
CB	Davon House	Jacksonville Jaguars	March 14, 2017
DE	Ricky Jean Francois	Washington Redskins	March 24, 2017
G	Justin McCray	N/A	March 29, 2017
LS	Derek Hart	N/A	March 31, 2017
G	Jahri Evans	New Orleans Saints	April 26, 2017
CB	Donatello Brown	N/A	May 5, 2017
OLB	Johnathan Calvin	N/A	May 5, 2017
WR	Michael Clark	N/A	May 5, 2017
WR	Montay Crockett	N/A	May 5, 2017
G	Thomas Evans	N/A	May 5, 2017
G	Geoff Gray	N/A	May 5, 2017
ILB	Cody Heiman	N/A	May 5, 2017
QB	Taysom Hill	N/A	May 5, 2017
DE	Izaah Lunsford	N/A	May 5, 2017
OT	Adam Pankey	N/A	May 5, 2017
TE	Aaron Peck	N/A	May 5, 2017
RB	Kalif Phillips	N/A	May 5, 2017
CB	Lenzy Pipkins	N/A	May 5, 2017
CB	David Rivers	N/A	May 5, 2017
P	Justin Vogel	N/A	May 5, 2017
OLB	Josh Letuligasenoa	N/A	May 8, 2017
CB	Raysean Pringle	N/A	May 8, 2017
RB	William Stanback	N/A	May 8, 2017
OLB	David Talley	N/A	May 8, 2017
S	Aaron Taylor	N/A	May 8, 2017
WR	Colby Pearson	N/A	June 1, 2017
OT	Robert Leff	N/A	June 6, 2017
CB	Daquan Holmes	N/A	June 7, 2017
TE	Emanuel Byrd	N/A	August 5, 2017
DE	Shaneil Jenkins	Seattle Seahawks	August 13, 2017
NT	Calvin Heurtelou	N/A	August 21, 2017
OLB	Ahmad Brooks	San Francisco 49ers	September 3, 2017
OLB	Chris Odom	N/A	September 3, 2017
NT	Quinton Dial	San Francisco 49ers	September 5, 2017
OT	Adam Pankey		September 13, 2017
DE	Ricky Jean Francois		September 21, 2017
RB	Joel Bouagnon	Chicago Bears	January 10, 2018

=== Subtractions ===
Position	Player	New team	Date
RB	Don Jackson		May 1, 2017
RB	Christine Michael	Indianapolis Colts	May 1, 2017
P	Jake Schum		June 1, 2017
C	Jacob Flores		June 6, 2017
CB	David Rivers	Tampa Bay Buccaneers	June 7, 2017
NT	Letroy Guion		August 8, 2017
DE	Shaneil Jenkins		August 15, 2017
LS	Derek Hart		August 28, 2017
WR	Colby Pearson		August 28, 2017
RB	William Stanback		August 28, 2017
G	Kofi Amichia		September 2, 2017
CB	Donatello Brown		September 2, 2017
TE	Emanuel Byrd		September 2, 2017
QB	Joe Callahan		September 2, 2017
OLB	Johnathan Calvin		September 2, 2017
WR	Michael Clark		September 2, 2017
WR	Montay Crockett		September 2, 2017
WR	Malachi Dupre	Buffalo Bills	September 2, 2017
G	Thomas Evans		September 2, 2017
OLB	Reggie Gilbert		September 2, 2017
G	Geoff Gray		September 2, 2017
ILB	Cody Heiman		September 2, 2017
NT	Calvin Heurtelou		September 2, 2017
QB	Taysom Hill	New Orleans Saints	September 2, 2017
CB	Daquan Holmes		September 2, 2017
OT	Robert Leff		September 2, 2017
LB	Josh Letuligasenoa		September 2, 2017
DE	Izaah Lunsford		September 2, 2017
LB	Derrick Mathews		September 2, 2017
WR	Max McCaffrey	New Orleans Saints	September 2, 2017
OT	Adam Pankey		September 2, 2017
TE	Aaron Peck		September 2, 2017
RB	Kalif Phillips		September 2, 2017
DE	Brian Price	Dallas Cowboys	September 2, 2017
CB	Raysean Pringle		September 2, 2017
S	Aaron Taylor		September 2, 2017
ILB	Jordan Tripp	Atlanta Falcons	September 2, 2017
S	Jermaine Whitehead		September 2, 2017
WR	DeAngelo Yancey		September 2, 2017
DE	Christian Ringo	Cincinnati Bengals	September 5, 2017
CB	LaDarius Gunter	Carolina Panthers	September 12, 2017
DE	Ricky Jean Francois	New England Patriots	September 13, 2017
TE	Martellus Bennett	New England Patriots	November 8, 2017

=== Draft ===
2017 Green Bay Packers draft
Round	Pick	Player	Position	College	Notes
2	33	Kevin King	Cornerback	Washington	
2	61	Josh Jones	Safety	NC State	
3	93	Montravius Adams	Defensive tackle	Auburn	
4	108	Vince Biegel	Linebacker	Wisconsin	
4	134	Jamaal Williams	Running back	BYU	
5	175	DeAngelo Yancey	Wide receiver	Purdue	
5	182	Aaron Jones *	Running back	UTEP	
6	212	Kofi Amichia	Guard	South Florida	
7	238	Devante Mays	Running back	Utah State	
7	247	Malachi Dupre	Wide receiver	LSU	
Made roster * Made at least one Pro Bowl during career

Notes

- The Packers received one compensatory selection – No. 182 overall.

Trades

- Green Bay traded their first round selection (29th) to Cleveland in exchange for Cleveland's 2nd and 4th round selections (33rd and 108th).
- Green Bay traded their 5th round selection (172nd) to Denver in exchange for Denver's 5th and 7th round selections (175th and 238th).

== Staff ==
2017 Green Bay Packers staff
Front office: Executive committee – Board of Directors; President/CEO – Mark Murphy; Executive vice president/general manager – Ted Thompson; Vice president of football administration/player finance – Russ Ball; Director of football operations – Eliot Wolf; Director of player personnel – Brian Gutekunst; Director of college scouting – Jon-Eric Sullivan; Assistant director of pro personnel – Tim Terry; Senior personnel executive – Alonzo Highsmith; Head coaches: Head coach – Mike McCarthy; Associate head coach/linebackers – Winston Moss; Offensive coaches: Offensive coordinator – Edgar Bennett; Quarterbacks – Alex Van Pelt; Running backs – Ben Sirmans; Wide receivers – Luke Getsy; Tight ends – Brian Angelichio; Offensive line – James Campen; Assistant offensive line – David Raih	Defensive coaches: Defensive coordinator – Dom Capers; Defensive line – Mike Trgovac; Assistant linebackers – Scott McCurley; Secondary (Cornerbacks) – Joe Whitt Jr.; Secondary (Safeties) – Darren Perry; Defensive front assistant – Jerry Montgomery; Defensive quality control – Tim McGarigle; Special teams coaches: Special teams coordinator – Ron Zook; Assistant special teams – Jason Simmons; Strength and conditioning: Strength and conditioning coordinator – Mark Lovat; Strength and conditioning assistant – Chris Gizzi; Strength and conditioning assistant – Thadeus Jackson; Strength and conditioning assistant – Grant Thorne

== Final roster ==
2017 Green Bay Packers roster
Quarterbacks (QB): 6 Joe Callahan; 7 Brett Hundley; Running backs (RB): 33 Aaron Jones; 40 Joe Kerridge FB; 32 Devante Mays; 22 Aaron Ripkowski FB; 30 Jamaal Williams; Wide receivers (WR): 17 Davante Adams; 81 Geronimo Allison; 89 Michael Clark; 18 Randall Cobb; 11 Trevor Davis; 83 Jeff Janis; 87 Jordy Nelson; Tight ends (TE): 86 Emanuel Byrd; 84 Lance Kendricks; 82 Richard Rodgers	Offensive linemen (OL): 69 David Bakhtiari LT; 54 Dillon Day C; 73 Jahri Evans RG; 63 Corey Linsley C; 64 Justin McCray RG; 74 Ulrick John LT; 77 Adam Pankey RT; 62 Lucas Patrick LG; 65 Lane Taylor LG; Defensive linemen (DL): 90 Montravius Adams DE; 97 Kenny Clark NT; 76 Mike Daniels DE; 91 Quinton Dial NT; 94 Dean Lowry DE	Linebackers (LB): 45 Vince Biegel OLB; 55 Ahmad Brooks OLB; 51 Kyler Fackrell OLB; 93 Reggie Gilbert OLB; 50 Blake Martinez ILB; 52 Clay Matthews OLB; 98 Chris Odom OLB; 47 Jake Ryan ILB; 48 Joe Thomas ILB; Defensive backs (DB): 44 Donatello Brown CB; 42 Morgan Burnett SS; 21 Ha Ha Clinton-Dix FS; 25 Marwin Evans SS; 28 Josh Hawkins CB; 31 Davon House CB; 27 Josh Jones SS; 41 Lenzy Pipkins CB; 23 Damarious Randall CB; 35 Jermaine Whitehead FS; Special teams (ST): 2 Mason Crosby K; 61 Brett Goode LS; 8 Justin Vogel P	Practice squad: 79 Kofi Amichia G; 16 Jake Kumerow WR; 71 Izaah Lunsford DE; 49 Derrick Mathews ILB; 13 Colby Pearson WR; 46 Raysean Pringle CB; 56 Ahmad Thomas ILB; 49 Robert Tonyan TE; 57 Zach Triner LS; 10 DeAngelo Yancey WR; Reserve: 29 Kentrell Brice SS (IR); 75 Bryan Bulaga RT (IR); 39 Demetri Goodson CB (IR); 20 Kevin King CB (IR); 88 Ty Montgomery RB (IR); 68 Kyle Murphy RT (IR); 59 Taybor Pepper LS (IR); 53 Nick Perry OLB (IR); 12 Aaron Rodgers QB (IR); 24 Quinten Rollins CB (IR); -- Jake Schum P (IR); 78 Jason Spriggs LT (IR); 57 David Talley ILB (IR); 26 Herb Waters CB (IR); Rookies in italics 53 active, 14 reserve, 11 practice squad

== Starters ==
=== Offense ===
Position	Name	GS
QB	Brett Hundley; Aaron Rodgers	9; 7
RB	Jamaal Williams; Ty Montgomery; Aaron Jones	7; 5; 4
FB	Aaron Ripkowski	2
WR	Randall Cobb	14
WR	Jordy Nelson	15
WR	Davante Adams; Geronimo Allison	14; 2
TE	Lance Kendricks; Martellus Bennett; Richard Rodgers	9; 7; 1
LT	David Bakhtiari; Kyle Murphy; Lane Taylor	12; 2; 2
LG	Lane Taylor; Justin McCray; Lucas Patrick	13; 2; 1
C	Corey Linsley	16
RG	Jahri Evans; Justin McCray; Lucas Patrick	14; 1; 1
RT	Bryan Bulaga; Justin McCray; Jason Spriggs; Kyle Murphy	5; 5; 5; 1

=== Defense ===
Position	Name	GS
DT	Mike Daniels; Quinton Dial	14; 1
NT	Kenny Clark; Quinton Dial	15; 1
DE	Dean Lowry	11
LE	Ahmad Brooks	1
OLB	Nick Perry; Ahmad Brooks	11; 4
OLB	Clay Matthews III; Kyler Fackrell	14; 2
ILB	Jake Ryan; Morgan Burnett; Josh Jones; Joe Thomas	12; 2; 1; 1
ILB	Blake Martinez	16
CB	Davon House; Kevin King; Lenzy Pipkins	12; 5; 1
CB	Damarious Randall; Josh Hawkins; Quinten Rollins	12; 3; 1
SS	Morgan Burnett; Kentrell Brice; Josh Jones; Marwin Evans	10; 3; 3; 1
FS	Ha Ha Clinton-Dix	16
S	Josh Jones	2

== Preseason ==
The Packers' preliminary preseason schedule was announced on April 10.

Week	Date	Opponent	Result	Record	Game site	NFL.com recap
1	August 10	Philadelphia Eagles	W 24–9	1–0	Lambeau Field	Recap
2	August 19	at Washington Redskins	W 21–17	2–0	FedExField	Recap
3	August 26	at Denver Broncos	L 17–20	2–1	Sports Authority Field at Mile High	Recap
4	August 31	Los Angeles Rams	W 24–10	3–1	Lambeau Field	Recap

== Regular season ==
=== Schedule ===
The Packers' preliminary regular season schedule was announced on April 20.

Week	Date	Opponent	Result	Record	Game site	NFL.com recap
1	September 10	Seattle Seahawks	**W** 17–9	1–0	Lambeau Field	Recap
2	September 17	at Atlanta Falcons	**L** 23–34	1–1	Mercedes-Benz Stadium	Recap
3	September 24	Cincinnati Bengals	**W** 27–24 (OT)	2–1	Lambeau Field	Recap
4	September 28	**Chicago Bears**	**W** 35–14	3–1	Lambeau Field	Recap
5	October 8	at Dallas Cowboys	**W** 35–31	4–1	AT&T Stadium	Recap
6	October 15	at **Minnesota Vikings**	**L** 10–23	4–2	U.S. Bank Stadium	Recap
7	October 22	New Orleans Saints	**L** 17–26	4–3	Lambeau Field	Recap
8	Bye					
9	November 6	**Detroit Lions**	**L** 17–30	4–4	Lambeau Field	Recap
10	November 12	at **Chicago Bears**	**W** 23–16	5–4	Soldier Field	Recap
11	November 19	Baltimore Ravens	**L** 0–23	5–5	Lambeau Field	Recap
12	November 26	at Pittsburgh Steelers	**L** 28–31	5–6	Heinz Field	Recap
13	December 3	Tampa Bay Buccaneers	**W** 26–20 (OT)	6–6	Lambeau Field	Recap
14	December 10	at Cleveland Browns	**W** 27–21 (OT)	7–6	FirstEnergy Stadium	Recap
15	December 17	at Carolina Panthers	**L** 24–31	7–7	Bank of America Stadium	Recap
16	December 23	**Minnesota Vikings**	**L** 0–16	7–8	Lambeau Field	Recap
17	December 31	at **Detroit Lions**	**L** 11–35	7–9	Ford Field	Recap

Note: Intra-division opponents are in bold text.

=== Game summaries ===
==== Week 1: vs. Seattle Seahawks ====
Week 1: Seattle Seahawks at Green Bay Packers – Game summary

Quarter	1	2	3	4	Total
Seahawks	0	3	3	3	**9**
**Packers**	0	0	14	3	**17**

at Lambeau Field, Green Bay, Wisconsin

- Date: September 10
- Game time: 3:25 p.m. CDT
- Game weather: 71 °F (22 °C), mostly sunny
- Game attendance: 78,381
- Referee: John Parry
- TV announcers (Fox): Joe Buck, Troy Aikman and Erin Andrews
- Recap, Gamebook

Game information

First quarter

- No scoring plays

Second quarter

- SEA – Blair Walsh 33-yard field goal, 0:04. Seahawks 3–0. **Drive: 8 plays, 74 yards, 0:55.**

Third quarter

- GB – Ty Montgomery 6-yard run (Mason Crosby kick), 10:39. Packers 7–3. **Drive: 1 play, 6 yards, 0:06.**
- SEA – Blair Walsh 21-yard field goal, 4:23. Packers 7–6. **Drive: 11 plays, 71 yards, 6:13.**
- GB – Jordy Nelson 32-yard pass from Aaron Rodgers (Mason Crosby kick), 0:22. Packers 14–6. **Drive: 9 plays, 75 yards, 4:03.**

Fourth quarter

- GB – Mason Crosby 40-yard field goal, 8:05. Packers 17–6. **Drive: 12 plays, 53 yards, 5:37.**
- SEA – Blair Walsh 41-yard field goal, 6:21. Packers 17–9. **Drive: 7 plays, 52 yards, 1:44.**

Top passers

- SEA – Russell Wilson – 14/27, 159 yards
- GB – Aaron Rodgers – 28/42, 311 yards, TD, INT

Top rushers

- SEA – Russell Wilson – 2 rushes, 40 yards
- GB – Ty Montgomery – 19 rushes, 54 yards, TD

Top receivers

- SEA – Doug Baldwin – 4 receptions, 63 yards
- GB – Randall Cobb – 9 receptions, 85 yards

The Packers' offense struggled for the first half against the Seahawks. On the Packers' first drive, Aaron Rodgers threw an interception that was returned for a touchdown, but an illegal block in the back penalty negated the score. Before that play Rodgers had gone his previous 251 regular season pass attempts without an interception, a career high. The Packers' defense held Seattle in check but trailed 3–0 at halftime. In the third quarter, Mike Daniels forced a fumble that Green Bay recovered at the Seattle 6-yard line, and Ty Montgomery ran in for a touchdown on the following play, giving the Packers a lead they wouldn't relinquish after that. Later Rodgers caught the Seahawks with 12 men on the field and capitalized on the free play by throwing a 32-yard touchdown to Jordy Nelson. The Packers only surrendered two field goals to Seattle for the rest of the game, giving a strong defensive showing in the season opener.

==== Week 2: at Atlanta Falcons ====
Week 2: Green Bay Packers at Atlanta Falcons – Game summary

Quarter	1	2	3	4	Total
Packers	7	0	3	13	**23**
**Falcons**	7	17	10	0	**34**

at Mercedes-Benz Stadium, Atlanta, Georgia

- Date: September 17
- Game time: 8:30 p.m. EDT/7:30 p.m. CDT
- Game weather: 78 °F (26 °C), clear – retractable roof open
- Game attendance: 70,826
- Referee: Walt Anderson
- TV announcers (NBC): Al Michaels, Cris Collinsworth and Michele Tafoya
- Recap, Gamebook

Game information

First quarter

- ATL – Devonta Freeman 1-yard run (Matt Bryant kick), 9:55. Falcons 7–0. **Drive: 7 plays, 86 yards, 5:09.**
- GB – Ty Montgomery 1-yard run (Mason Crosby kick), 3:47. Tied 7–7. **Drive: 11 plays, 75 yards, 6:08.**

Second quarter

- ATL – Devonta Freeman 2-yard run (Matt Bryant kick), 11:14. Falcons 14–7. **Drive: 10 plays, 87 yards, 4:12.**
- ATL – Matt Bryant 51-yard field goal, 3:27. Falcons 17–7. **Drive: 7 plays, 58 yards, 3:53.**
- ATL – Tevin Coleman 3-yard pass from Matt Ryan (Matt Bryant kick), 0:24. Falcons 24–7. **Drive: 4 plays, 36 yards, 0:28.**

Third quarter

- ATL – Desmond Trufant fumble recovery 15-yard run, 14:17. Falcons 31–7.
- GB – Mason Crosby 28-yard field goal, 9:37. Falcons 31–10. **Drive: 11 plays, 65 yards, 4:31.**
- ATL – Matt Bryant 53-yard field goal, 4:25. Falcons 34–10. **Drive: 10 plays, 40 yards, 5:14.**

Fourth quarter

- GB – Davante Adams 33-yard pass from Aaron Rodgers, 12:50. Falcons 34–16. **Drive: 13 plays, 75 yards, 6:37.**
- GB – Ty Montgomery 1-yard pass from Aaron Rodgers (Mason Crosby kick), 5:54. Falcons 34–23. **Drive: 8 plays, 85 yards, 3:44.**
- GB – Aaron Rodgers – 33/50, 343 yards, 2 TD, INT
- ATL – Matt Ryan – 19/28, 252 yards, TD

Top rushers

- GB – Ty Montgomery – 10 rushes, 35 yards, TD
- ATL – Devonta Freeman – 19 rushes, 84 yards, 2 TD

Top receivers

- GB – Davante Adams – 8 receptions, 99 yards, TD
- ATL – Julio Jones – 5 receptions, 108 yards

In a rematch of the 2016 NFC Championship game earlier that year, the Falcons defeated the Packers to open up their new stadium. The teams exchanged opening drive touchdowns, but with both starting tackles out of the game due to injury, the Packers' offense failed to keep pace. At the end of the first half, with the score 17–7, a 36-yard pass to Randall Cobb was called back due to a controversial Offensive Pass Interference call on tight end Martellus Bennet. On the ensuing play Aaron Rodgers threw an interception to Desmond Trufant that lead to a Falcons touchdown, making the score 24–7 at halftime. Aaron Rodgers fumbled on the Packers' first drive of the second half, leading to another Falcons' touchdown. Though the Packers would score two touchdowns in the fourth quarter, the Falcons still prevailed, 34–23. On a one-yard pass to Ty Montgomery late in the fourth quarter, Aaron Rodgers recorded his 300th career touchdown. He is the fastest quarterback in NFL history to reach the milestone, needing only 4,742 attempts.

==== Week 3: vs. Cincinnati Bengals ====
Week 3: Cincinnati Bengals at Green Bay Packers – Game summary

Quarter	1	2	3	4	OT	Total
Bengals	7	14	0	3	0	**24**
**Packers**	7	0	7	10	3	**27**

at Lambeau Field, Green Bay, Wisconsin

- Date: September 24
- Game time: 3:25 p.m. CDT
- Game weather: 89 °F (32 °C), sunny
- Game attendance: 78,323
- Referee: Gene Steratore
- TV announcers (CBS): Jim Nantz, Tony Romo and Tracy Wolfson
- Recap, Gamebook

Game information

First quarter

- CIN – A. J. Green 10-yard pass from Andy Dalton (Randy Bullock kick), 9:40. Bengals 7–0. **Drive: 10 plays, 79 yards, 5:20.**
- GB – Lance Kendricks 1-yard pass from Aaron Rodgers (Mason Crosby kick), 7:51. Tied 7–7. **Drive: 6 plays, 60 yards, 1:54.**

Second quarter

- CIN – Giovani Bernard 6-yard pass from Andy Dalton (Randy Bullock kick), 12:35. Bengals 14–7. **Drive: 9 plays, 60 yards, 4:49.**
- CIN – William Jackson III 75-yard interception run, 12:35. Bengals 21–7.

Third quarter

- GB – Jordy Nelson 1-yard pass from Aaron Rodgers (Mason Crosby kick), 10:00. Bengals 21–14. **Drive: 8 plays, 75 yards, 5:06.**

Fourth quarter

- GB – Mason Crosby 28-yard field goal, 14:47. Bengals 21–17. **Drive: 8 plays, 52 yards, 2:58.**
- CIN – Randy Bullock 46-yard field goal, 3:51. Bengals 24–17. **Drive: 11 plays, 63 yards, 5:57.**
- GB – Jordy Nelson 3-yard pass from Aaron Rodgers (Mason Crosby kick), 0:21. Tied 24–24. **Drive: 12 plays, 75 yards, 3:29.**

Overtime

- GB – Mason Crosby 27-yard field goal, 6:26. Packers 27–24. **Drive: 5 plays, 70 yards, 1:17.**

Top passers

- CIN – Andy Dalton – 21/27, 212 yards, 2 TD
- GB – Aaron Rodgers – 28/42, 313 yards, 3 TD, INT

Top rushers

- CIN – Joe Mixon – 18 rushes, 62 yards
- GB – Ty Montgomery – 12 rushes, 35 yards

Top receivers

- CIN – A. J. Green – 10 receptions, 111 yards, TD
- GB – Geronimo Allison – 6 receptions, 122 yards

Although the Bengals entered the game 0–2 without scoring an offensive touchdown, the Packers fell behind early once again, 21–7, with one of the Bengal scores being an interception of Aaron Rodgers returned for the touchdown, which was only the second time in Rodgers career that he'd given up an interception for a touchdown. The Packers were able to rally back, tying the game with 21 seconds left in the game on a pinpoint 3-yard touchdown pass from Rodgers to Jordy Nelson. After forcing Cincinnati to punt on the opening drive in overtime, the Packers found themselves in a 3rd and 10 situation but Aaron Rodgers managed to draw the Bengals offsides, allowing for a free play that resulted in a Geronimo Allison 72-yard catch to the Cincinnati 8-yard line. Mason Crosby then kicked the winning field goal, giving Aaron Rodgers his first ever overtime win, after having gone 0–7 for his career in overtime games, which included the playoffs. This also gave Rodgers his first win over the Bengals, giving him a win over every NFL team but the Packers (including the playoffs).

==== Week 4: vs. Chicago Bears ====
Week 4: Chicago Bears at Green Bay Packers – Game summary

Quarter	1	2	3	4	Total
Bears	0	7	0	7	**14**
**Packers**	14	7	7	7	**35**

at Lambeau Field, Green Bay, Wisconsin

- Date: September 28
- Game time: 7:25 p.m. CDT
- Game weather: 65 °F (18 °C), cloudy with rain
- Game attendance: 78,362
- Referee: John Hussey
- TV announcers (CBS/NFLN/Amazon Video): Jim Nantz, Tony Romo, Tracy Wolfson and Jay Feely
- Recap, Gamebook

Game information

First quarter

- GB – Davante Adams 5-yard pass from Aaron Rodgers (Mason Crosby kick), 9:49. Packers 7–0. **Drive: 10 plays, 75 yards, 5:11.**
- GB – Randall Cobb 2-yard pass from Aaron Rodgers (Mason Crosby kick), 8:59. Packers 14–0. **Drive: 3 plays, 3 yards, 0:45.**

Second quarter

- GB – Aaron Jones 2-yard run (Mason Crosby kick), 4:52. Packers 21–0. **Drive: 2 plays, 60 yards, 0:40.**
- CHI – Kendall Wright 5-yard pass from Mike Glennon (Connor Barth kick), 0:12. Packers 21–7. **Drive: 7 plays, 72 yards, 1:33.**

Third quarter

- GB – Jordy Nelson 4-yard pass from Aaron Rodgers (Mason Crosby kick), 4:13. Packers 28–7. **Drive: 13 plays, 63 yards, 4:09.**

Fourth quarter

- GB – Jordy Nelson 8-yard pass from Aaron Rodgers (Mason Crosby kick), 15:00. Packers 35–7. **Drive: 6 plays, 42 yards, 2:51.**
- CHI – Jordan Howard 3-yard run (Connor Barth kick), 6:06. Packers 35–14. **Drive: 15 plays, 75 yards, 8:53.**

Top passers

- CHI – Mike Glennon – 21/33, 218 yards, TD, 2 INT
- GB – Aaron Rodgers – 18/26, 179 yards, 4 TD

Top rushers

- CHI – Jordan Howard – 18 rushes, 53 yards, TD
- GB – Aaron Jones – 13 rushes, 49 yards, TD

Top receivers

- CHI – Kendall Wright – 4 receptions, 51 yards, TD
- GB – Jordy Nelson – 4 receptions, 75 yards, 2 TD

In the 195th meeting between the Packers and Bears, the Packers took advantage early, scoring first on their opening drive, then scoring less than a minute later after recovering a Bear fumble. Taking advantage of several Chicago miscues, including three turnovers and a missed field goal, the Packers rolled to a convincing win over their rivals, with Aaron Rodgers throwing four touchdown passes. The victory also gave the Packers a 95–94–6 edge in the rivalry with the Bears, the first time the Packers had the lead in the rivalry since 1933. In the third quarter wide receiver Davante Adams took a vicious and illegal hit from Bears linebacker Danny Trevathan that required a stretcher to take Adams off the field. Adams was diagnosed with a concussion and immediately taken to the hospital, where he spent the night. He did not have any significant nerve damage and would return for next Sunday's game against the Dallas Cowboys.

==== Week 5: at Dallas Cowboys ====
Week 5: Green Bay Packers at Dallas Cowboys – Game summary

Quarter	1	2	3	4	Total
**Packers**	6	6	3	20	**35**
Cowboys	7	14	0	10	**31**

at AT&T Stadium, Arlington, Texas

- Date: October 8
- Game time: 3:25 p.m. CDT
- Game weather: Played indoors (retractable roof closed)
- Game attendance: 93,329
- Referee: Terry McAulay
- TV announcers (Fox): Joe Buck, Troy Aikman and Erin Andrews
- Recap, Gamebook

Game information

First quarter

- DAL – Cole Beasley 2-yard pass from Dak Prescott (Dan Bailey kick), 8:26. Cowboys 7–0. **Drive: 12 plays, 75 yards, 6:36.**
- GB – Davante Adams 10-yard pass from Aaron Rodgers, 4:05. Cowboys 7–6. **Drive: 8 plays, 75 yards, 4:23.**

Second quarter

- DAL – Cole Beasley 5-yard pass from Dak Prescott (Dan Bailey kick), 13:41. Cowboys 14–6. **Drive: 11 plays, 75 yards, 5:24.**
- DAL – Dez Bryant 10-yard pass from Dak Prescott (Dan Bailey kick), 6:16. Cowboys 21–6. **Drive: 10 plays, 57 yards, 5:56.**
- GB – Aaron Jones 7-yard run, 0:58. Cowboys 21–12. **Drive: 13 plays, 75 yards, 5:16.**

Third quarter

- GB – Mason Crosby 22-yard field goal, 11:12. Cowboys 21–15. **Drive: 9 plays, 71 yards, 3:51.**

Fourth quarter

- GB – Jordy Nelson 10-yard pass from Aaron Rodgers (Mason Crosby kick), 15:00. Packers 22–21. **Drive: 14 plays, 88 yards, 7:43.**
- DAL – Dan Bailey 43-yard field goal, 11:49. Cowboys 24–22. **Drive: 8 plays, 50 yards, 3:09.**
- GB – Damarious Randall 21-yard interception return, 10:04. Packers 28–24.
- DAL – Dak Prescott 11-yard run, 1:13. Cowboys 31–28. **Drive: 17 plays, 79 yards, 8:43.**
- GB – Davante Adams 12-yard pass from Aaron Rodgers (Mason Crosby kick), 0:11. Packers 35–31. **Drive: 9 plays, 75 yards, 1:02.**
- GB – Aaron Rodgers – 19/29, 221 yards, 3 TD
- DAL – Dak Prescott – 25/36, 251 yards, 3 TD, INT

Top rushers

- GB – Aaron Jones – 19 rushes, 125 yards, TD
- DAL – Ezekiel Elliott – 29 rushes, 116 yards

Top receivers

- GB – Davante Adams – 7 receptions, 66 yards, 2 TD
- DAL – Jason Witten – 8 receptions, 61 yards

In a rematch of the Divisional playoff game from the previous season, the Cowboys took an early 21–6 lead over the Packers, before the Packers rallied to pull themselves within six points at the end of the third quarter. In the fourth quarter, the lead changed hands four times, with the Packers getting the last push. With just over a minute left, Aaron Rodgers led a drive that was capped off by a 12-yard touchdown pass to Davante Adams with eleven seconds left in the game, giving the Packers their third win in a row. Rookie running back Aaron Jones also had his first 100-yard game of his NFL game, as well as the first for any running back on the Packers for the season.

==== Week 6: at Minnesota Vikings ====
Week 6: Green Bay Packers at Minnesota Vikings – Game summary

Quarter	1	2	3	4	Total
Packers	0	10	0	0	**10**
**Vikings**	0	14	3	6	**23**

at U.S. Bank Stadium, Minneapolis, Minnesota

- Date: October 15
- Game time: 12:00 p.m. CDT
- Game weather: Played indoors (dome stadium)
- Game attendance: 66,848
- Referee: Ronald Torbert
- TV announcers (Fox): Thom Brennaman, Troy Aikman and Erin Andrews
- Recap, Gamebook

Game information

First quarter

- No scoring plays

Second quarter

- MIN – Jerick McKinnon 27-yard pass from Case Keenum (Kai Forbath kick), 15:00. Vikings 7–0. **Drive: 2 plays, 42 yards, 0:11.**
- GB – Davante Adams 14-yard pass from Brett Hundley (Mason Crosby kick), 10:47. Tied 7–7. **Drive: 3 plays, 18 yards, 1:24.**
- MIN – Jerick McKinnon 3-yard run (Kai Forbath kick), 7:26. Vikings 14–7. **Drive: 8 play, 84 yards, 3:18.**
- GB – Mason Crosby 26-yard field goal, 1:53. Vikings 14–10. **Drive: 7 plays, 30 yards, 2:11.**

Thir dquarter

- MIN – Kai Forbath 36-yard field goal, 9:39. Vikings 17–10. **Drive: 12 plays, 57 yards, 5:25.**

Fourth quarter

- MIN – Kai Forbath 34-yard field goal, 15:00. Vikings 20–10. **Drive: 11 plays, 66 yards, 5:16.**
- MIN – Kai Forbath 53-yard field goal, 10:52. Vikings 23–10. **Drive: 4 plays, 0 yards, 1:29.**
- GB – Brett Hundley – 18/33, 157 yards, TD, 3 INT
- MIN – Case Keenum – 24/38, 239 yards, TD, INT

Top rushers

- GB – Aaron Jones – 13 rushes, 41 yards
- MIN – Jerick McKinnon – 16 rushes, 69 yards, TD

Top receivers

- GB – Jordy Nelson – 6 receptions, 60 yards
- MIN – Adam Thielen – 9 receptions, 97 yards

The Packers lost Aaron Rodgers to a shoulder injury early in the game after he took a big hit from Minnesota linebacker Anthony Barr. It was later revealed that he suffered a broken right collarbone and the injury could end his 2017 season. Brett Hundley threw one touchdown, but also threw three costly interceptions, in relief of Rodgers as the Packers took a 23–10 loss. After the game, Mike McCarthy announced that due to Rodgers' injury, Hundley would be given the starting quarterback position "indefinitely."

==== Week 7: vs. New Orleans Saints ====
Week 7: New Orleans Saints at Green Bay Packers – Game summary

Quarter	1	2	3	4	Total
**Saints**	0	7	9	10	**26**
Packers	7	7	0	3	**17**

at Lambeau Field, Green Bay, Wisconsin

- Date: October 22
- Game time: 12:00 p.m. CDT
- Game weather: 52 °F (11 °C), rain
- Game attendance: 78,380
- Referee: Jerome Boger
- TV announcers (Fox): Kenny Albert, Charles Davis and Pam Oliver
- Recap, Gamebook

Game information

First quarter

- GB – Aaron Jones 46-yard run (Mason Crosby kick), 13:09. Packers 7–0. **Drive: 5 plays, 75 yards, 2:00.**

Second quarter

- NO – Mark Ingram II 12-yard run (Wil Lutz kick), 12:35. Tied 7–7. **Drive: 7 plays, 53 yards, 3:13.**
- GB – Brett Hundley 14-yard run (Mason Crosby kick), 08:45. Packers 14–7. **Drive: 8 plays, 75 yards, 3:54.**

Third quarter

- NO – Brandon Coleman 22-yard pass from Drew Brees, 11:29. Packers 14–13. **Drive: 7 plays, 59 yards, 3:36.**
- NO – Wil Lutz 28-yard field goal, 4:12. Saints 16–14. **Drive: 10 plays, 74 yards, 4:40.**

Fourth quarter

- GB – Mason Crosby 46-yard field goal, 14:50. Packers 17–16. **Drive: 10 plays, 53 yards, 4:18.**
- NO – Wil Lutz 44-yard field goal, 10:26. Saints 19–17. **Drive: 9 plays, 60 yards, 4:29.**
- NO – Drew Brees 1-yard run (Wil Lutz kick), 4:57. Saints 26–17. **Drive: 8 plays, 55 yards, 3:30.**

Top passers

- NO – Drew Brees – 27/38, 331 yards, TD, 2 INT
- GB – Brett Hundley – 12/25, 87 yards, INT

Top rushers

- NO – Mark Ingram II – 22 rushes, 105 yards, TD
- GB – Aaron Jones – 17 rushes, 131 yards, TD

Top receivers

- NO – Ted Ginn Jr. – 7 receptions, 141 yards
- GB – Martellus Bennett – 2 receptions, 17 yards

In his first career start, Brett Hundley took a conservative approach and completed 12 of 25 passes for only 87 yards, adding an interception without any passing touchdowns. Rookie Aaron Jones rushed for 131 yards on 17 carries and a touchdown, his second 100-yard game in three career starts. Two first half interceptions from Drew Brees helped the Packers maintain a 14–7 lead at halftime, but the Saints came out of the half scoring 9 points on their first two drives to take a 16–14 lead. After the two teams exchanged field goals, the Saints took the lead for good on an 8-play, 55 yard drive that ended with a 1-yard touchdown rush from Drew Brees. Green Bay's comeback effort was thwarted when Brett Hundley threw an interception to safety Kenny Vaccaro on the ensuing drive. The win marked the Saints' fourth consecutive victory after starting the season 0–2.

==== Week 8: Bye week ====
No game. Green Bay had a bye week.

==== Week 9: vs. Detroit Lions ====
Week 9: Detroit Lions at Green Bay Packers – Game summary

Quarter	1	2	3	4	Total
**Lions**	7	7	3	13	**30**
Packers	0	3	0	14	**17**

at Lambeau Field, Green Bay, Wisconsin

- Date: November 6
- Game time: 7:30 p.m. CST
- Game weather: 35 °F (2 °C), cloudy
- Game attendance: 77,575
- Referee: Clete Blakeman
- TV announcers (ESPN): Sean McDonough, Jon Gruden and Lisa Salters
- Recap, Gamebook

Game information

First quarter

- DET – Marvin Jones 25-yard pass from Matthew Stafford (Matt Prater kick), 1:50. Lions 7–0. **Drive: 9 plays, 71 yards, 4:59.**

Second quarter

- DET – Ameer Abdullah 4-yard run (Matt Prater kick), 2:53. Lions 14–0. **Drive: 13 plays, 91 yards, 6:50.**
- GB – Mason Crosby 35-yard field goal, 0:02. Lions 14–3. **Drive: 12 plays, 68 yards, 2:47.**

Third quarter

- DET – Matt Prater 44-yard field goal, 9:10. Lions 17–3. **Drive: 11 plays, 50 yards, 5:54.**

Fourth quarter

- DET – Matt Prater 19-yard field goal, 12:33. Lions 20–3. **Drive: 12 plays, 63 yards, 6:52.**
- GB – Brett Hundley 1-yard run (Mason Crosby kick), 9:55. Lions 20–10. **Drive: 7 plays, 78 yards, 2:39.**
- DET – Marvin Jones 11-yard pass from Matthew Stafford (Matt Prater kick), 8:12. Lions 27–10. **Drive: 4 plays, 75 yards, 1:46.**
- DET – Matt Prater 31-yard field goal, 1:46. Lions 30–10. **Drive: 10 plays, 33 yards, 4:21.**
- GB – Jamaal Williams 1-yard run (Mason Crosby kick), 0:00. Lions 30–17. **Drive: 6 plays, 75 yards, 1:42.**

Top passers

- DET – Matthew Stafford – 26/33, 361 yards, 2 TD
- GB – Brett Hundley – 26/38, 245 yards

Top rushers

- DET – Ameer Abdullah – 21 rushes, 48 yards, TD
- GB – Ty Montgomery – 5 rushes, 33 yards

Top receivers

- DET – Golden Tate – 7 receptions, 113 yards
- GB – Randall Cobb – 5 receptions, 58 yards

Although the Packers came into the game off of a 15-day break, they played sloppily and lost to the Lions for only the second time at home since 1991. The Packers' solid opening drive was spoiled when kicker Mason Crosby's 38-yard attempt was blocked. The Lions scored touchdowns on two of their next three possessions as the Packers' Offense stalled with consecutive three and outs. Lions quarterback Matthew Stafford played an efficient game, registering two touchdowns with no interceptions, resulting in a 132.4 passer rating. In his second career start, Brett Hundley once again failed to attack the defense downfield or establish a comfortable pocket presence. He was sacked three times and failed to throw a passing touchdown for the second consecutive game.

==== Week 10: at Chicago Bears ====
Week 10: Green Bay Packers at Chicago Bears – Game summary

Quarter	1	2	3	4	Total
**Packers**	3	7	3	10	**23**
Bears	3	3	0	10	**16**

at Soldier Field, Chicago, Illinois

- Date: November 12
- Game time: 12:00 p.m. CST
- Game weather: 39 °F (4 °C), rain
- Game attendance: 61,285
- Referee: Tony Corrente
- TV announcers (Fox): Thom Brennaman, Chris Spielman and Peter Schrager
- Recap, Gamebook

Game information

First quarter

- GB – Mason Crosby 40-yard field goal, 7:25. Packers 3–0. **Drive: 11 plays, 70 yards, 4:37.**
- CHI – Connor Barth 45-yard field goal, 2:21. Tied 3–3. **Drive: 8 plays, 53 yards, 5:05.**

Second quarter

- GB – Ty Montgomery 37-yard run (Mason Crosby kick), 11:49. Packers 10–3. **Drive: 3 plays, 79 yards, 1:43.**
- CHI – Connor Barth 44-yard field goal, 0:01. Packers 10–6. **Drive: 10 plays, 39 yards, 1:37.**

Third quarter

- GB – Mason Crosby 24-yard field goal, 10:20. Packers 13–6. **Drive: 10 plays, 40 yards, 4:44.**

Fourth quarter

- GB – Mason Crosby 50-yard field goal, 13:14. Packers 16–6. **Drive: 10 plays, 26 yards, 4:20.**
- CHI – Josh Bellamy 46-yard pass from Mitchell Trubisky (Connor Barth kick), 10:48. Packers 16–13. **Drive: 4 plays, 70 yards, 2:30.**
- GB – Davante Adams 19-yard pass from Brett Hundley (Mason Crosby kick), 5:37. Packers 23–13. **Drive: 8 plays, 75 yards, 5:10.**
- CHI – Connor Barth 49-yard field goal, 3:23. Packers 23–16. **Drive: 8 plays, 49 yards, 2:10.**
- GB – Brett Hundley – 18/25, 212 yards, TD
- CHI – Mitchell Trubisky – 21/35, 297 yards, TD

Top rushers

- GB – Jamaal Williams – 20 rushes, 67 yards
- CHI – Jordan Howard – 15 rushes, 54 yards

Top receivers

- GB – Davante Adams – 5 receptions, 90 yards, TD
- CHI – Dontrelle Inman – 6 receptions, 88 yards

Brett Hundley earned his first career win against rival Chicago Bears, finishing with one touchdown, no interceptions and a career high 110.8 passer rating. After failing to apply a solid pass rush in the previous two games, the Packers' Defense sacked Bears rookie Quarterback Mitchell Trubisky five times, with linebacker Nick Perry accounting for three. The Packers held Chicago's strong rushing attack to a mere 3.2 yards per carry. Packers' running backs Aaron Jones and Ty Montgomery left with knee and rib injuries, respectively, allowing rookie Jamaal Williams to see his first action in the NFL. Although only averaging 3.3 yards per rush, Williams ran well against a stout Chicago defensive front. In the second quarter, with Green Bay holding a 10–3 advantage, the Bears drove to Green Bay's 25-yard line and on third down and 13 Trubisky completed a short pass to running back Benny Cunningham that was first ruled down at the two yard line. Bears coach Jon Fox challenged the play, believing Cunningham reached the endzone, but upon review the officials determined that Cunningham lost the ball before stepping out of bounds, and in reaching for the pylon actually fumbled into the endzone. The resulting call was a touchback and Packers' ball at the 20-yard line. Although the Packers punted on the resulting possession, the reversal proved costly in a one score game.

==== Week 11: vs. Baltimore Ravens ====
Week 11: Baltimore Ravens at Green Bay Packers – Game summary

Quarter	1	2	3	4	Total
**Ravens**	0	6	7	10	**23**
Packers	0	0	0	0	**0**

at Lambeau Field, Green Bay, Wisconsin

- Date: November 19
- Game time: 12:00 p.m. CST
- Game weather: 28 °F (−2 °C), sunny
- Game attendance: 77,945
- Referee: Jeff Triplette
- TV announcers (CBS): Kevin Harlan, Rich Gannon and Jenny Dell
- Recap, Gamebook

Game information

First quarter

- No scoring plays

Second quarter

- BAL – Justin Tucker 32-yard field goal, 15:00. Ravens 3–0. **Drive: 10 plays, 47 yards, 4:51.**
- BAL – Justin Tucker 39-yard field goal, 0:03. Ravens 6–0. **Drive: 4 plays, 9 yards, 1:37.**

Third quarter

- BAL – Mike Wallace 21-yard pass from Joe Flacco (Justin Tucker kick), 13:14. Ravens 13–0. **Drive: 4 plays, 59 yards, 1:52.**

Fourth quarter

- BAL – Justin Tucker 23-yard field goal, 4:50. Ravens 16–0. **Drive: 5 plays, 24 yards, 1:57.**
- BAL – Alex Collins 3-yard run (Justin Tucker kick), 2:17. Ravens 23–0. **Drive: 1 play, 3 yards, 0:05.**

Top passers

- BAL– Joe Flacco – 22/28, 183 yards, TD, INT
- GB – Brett Hundley – 21/36, 239 yards, 3 INT

Top rushers

- BAL– Alex Collins – 20 rushes, 49 yards, TD
- GB – Jamaal Williams – 18 rushes, 57 yards

Top receivers

- BAL– Mike Wallace – 4 receptions, 56 yards, TD
- GB – Davante Adams – 8 receptions, 126 yards

The Packers wore their alternative throwback uniforms for this game.

For the first time in franchise history, the Packers lost to the Ravens at home. It was the second time in 11 years that the team was shut-out at home. After going the previous two games without a turnover, the Packers committed five: two fumbles and three interceptions. Brett Hundley threw three interceptions, including one in the end-zone on the team's opening drive, bringing his season interception total to seven, matching Rodgers' total from the entire 2016 regular season. Packers' rookie running back DeVante Mays fumbled on the first two carries of his career, losing one. Field position was key as the Ravens' special teams often kept the Packers starting drives deep in their own territory.

==== Week 12: at Pittsburgh Steelers ====
Week 12: Green Bay Packers at Pittsburgh Steelers – Game summary

Quarter	1	2	3	4	Total
Packers	14	0	7	7	**28**
**Steelers**	6	8	7	10	**31**

at Heinz Field, Pittsburgh, Pennsylvania

- Date: November 26
- Game time: 8:30 p.m. EST/7:30 p.m. CST
- Game weather: 38 °F (3 °C), clear
- Game attendance: 62,147
- Referee: Ed Hochuli
- TV announcers (NBC): Al Michaels, Cris Collinsworth and Michele Tafoya
- Recap, Gamebook

Game information

First quarter

- PIT – Xavier Grimble 1-yard pass from Ben Roethlisberger, 8:19. Steelers 6–0. **Drive: 12 plays, 59 yards, 6:46.**
- GB – Randall Cobb 39-yard pass from Brett Hundley (Mason Crosby kick), 4:53. Packers 7–6. **Drive: 6 plays, 60 yards, 3:29.**
- GB – Jamaal Williams 54-yard pass from Brett Hundley (Mason Crosby kick), 1:33. Packers 14–6. **Drive: 3 plays, 55 yards, 0:50.**

Second quarter

- PIT – Martavis Bryant 17-yard pass from Ben Roethlisberger, (Two-point conversion, Antonio Brown pass from Ben Roethlisberger), 7:26. Tied 14–14. **Drive: 5 plays, 65 yards, 2:51.**

Third quarter

- GB – Davante Adams 55-yard pass from Brett Hundley (Mason Crosby kick), 12:17. Packers 21–14. **Drive: 6 plays, 76 yards, 2:54.**
- PIT – Antonio Brown 1-yard pass from Ben Roethlisberger, (Chris Boswell kick), 0:54. Tied 21–21. **Drive: 6 plays, 53 yards, 3:25.**

Fourth quarter

- PIT – Antonio Brown 33-yard pass from Ben Roethlisberger, (Chris Boswell kick), 8:50. Steelers 28–21. **Drive: 7 plays, 68 yards, 4:14.**
- GB – Jamaal Williams 4-yard run (Mason Crosby kick), 2:08. Tied 28–28. **Drive: 12 plays, 77 yards, 6:40.**
- PIT – Chris Boswell 53-yard field goal, 0:04. Steelers 31–28. **Drive: 4 plays, 35 yards, 0:17.**
- GB – Brett Hundley – 17/26, 245 yards, 3 TD
- PIT – Ben Roethlisberger – 33/45, 351 yards, 4 TD, 2 INT

Top rushers

- GB – Jamaal Williams – 21 rushes, 66 yards, TD
- PIT – Le'Veon Bell – 20 rushes, 95 yards

Top receivers

- GB – Davante Adams – 5 receptions, 82 yards, TD
- PIT – Antonio Brown – 10 receptions, 169 yards, 2 TD

In one of the NFL's best games of 2017, Brett Hundley played his best game as a Packer. He threw two dimes to Cobb and Jamaal Williams for touchdowns. He would throw a third to Davante Adams on the opening drive of the second half. The Steelers and the Packers traded blows all game. Field position, which is something the Packers have struggled with in 2017, cost them the game. After a one-minute drive led to a punt, the Steelers drove 35 yards down the field in 17 seconds in the waning moments of the fourth quarter. Chris Boswell hit a career long 53-yard field goal as time expired. This would be the first of three straight game winning field goals for Boswell. The Steelers won the game 31–28.

==== Week 13: vs. Tampa Bay Buccaneers ====
Week 13: Tampa Bay Buccaneers at Green Bay Packers – Game summary

Quarter	1	2	3	4	OT	Total
Buccaneers	7	3	0	10	0	**20**
**Packers**	3	14	0	3	6	**26**

at Lambeau Field, Green Bay, Wisconsin

- Date: December 3
- Game time: 12:00 p.m. CST
- Game weather: 42 °F (6 °C), cloudy
- Game attendance: 77,684
- Referee: Terry McAulay
- TV announcers (Fox): Tim Brando, Greg Jennings and Jennifer Hale
- Recap, Gamebook

Game information

First quarter

- TB – Cameron Brate 28-yard pass from Jameis Winston (Patrick Murray kick), 9:58. Buccaneers 7–0. **Drive: 10 plays, 75 yards, 5:08.**
- GB – Mason Crosby 37-yard field goal, 2:34. Buccaneers 7–3. **Drive: 14 plays, 61 yards, 7:22.**

Second quarter

- GB – Jamaal Williams 1-yard run (Mason Crosby kick), 7:17. Packers 10–7. **Drive: 5 plays, 45 yards, 2:32.**
- GB – Dean Lowry 61-yard fumble return (Mason Crosby kick), 4:31. Packers 17–7.
- TB – Patrick Murray 36-yard field goal, 0:17. Packers 17–10. **Drive: 12 plays, 57 yards, 4:04.**

Third quarter

- No scoring plays

Fourth quarter

- TB – Patrick Murray 30-yard field goal, 14:33. Packers 17–13. **Drive: 13 plays, 59 yards, 5:50.**
- TB – Cameron Brate 11-yard pass from Jameis Winston (Patrick Murray kick), 6:06. Buccaneers 20–17. **Drive: 12 plays, 78 yards, 7:02.**
- GB – Mason Crosby 22-yard field goal, 2:03. Tied 20–20. **Drive: 10 plays, 70 yards, 4:01.**

Overtime

- GB – Aaron Jones 20-yard run, 6:08. Packers 26–20. **Drive: 8 plays, 72 yards, 4:01.**

Top passers

- TB – Jameis Winston – 21/32, 270 yards, 2 TD
- GB – Brett Hundley – 13/22, 84 yards, INT

Top rushers

- TB – Peyton Barber – 23 rushes, 102 yards
- GB – Jamaal Williams – 21 rushes, 113 yards, TD

Top receivers

- TB – Peyton Barber – 4 receptions, 41 yards
- GB – Davante Adams – 4 receptions, 42 yards

The Packers had a 17–10 halftime lead, in large part to Lowry's defensive touchdown. Jameis Winston caught fire in the second half and gave the Buccaneers a 20–17 lead. Despite Brett Hundley only having 54 passing yards up to this point (37 on the Packers opening drive), he led the Packers down the field to tie the game at 20–20 with two minutes to play. The Packers started overtime with the ball, and Aaron Jones capped off the comeback win with a 20-yard touchdown run. Hundley would finish the game with 84 passing yards, and the Packers improved to 6–6.

==== Week 14: at Cleveland Browns ====
Week 14: Green Bay Packers at Cleveland Browns – Game summary

Quarter	1	2	3	4	OT	Total
**Packers**	7	0	0	14	6	**27**
Browns	7	7	7	0	0	**21**

at FirstEnergy Stadium, Cleveland, Ohio

- Date: December 10
- Game time: 1:00 p.m. EST/12:00 p.m. CST
- Game weather: 29 °F (−2 °C), cloudy
- Game attendance: 67,431
- Referee: Bill Vinovich
- TV announcers (Fox): Thom Brennaman, Chris Spielman and Peter Schrager
- Recap, Gamebook

Game information

First quarter

- GB – Jamaal Williams 30-yard pass from Brett Hundley (Mason Crosby kick), 8:57. Packers 7–0. **Drive: 11 plays, 74 yards, 6:10.**
- CLE – Josh Gordon 18-yard pass from DeShone Kizer (Zane Gonzalez kick), 10:47. Tied 7–7. **Drive: 7 plays, 84 yards, 4:05.**

Second quarter

- CLE – Duke Johnson 7-yard pass from DeShone Kizer (Zane Gonzalez kick), 5:16. Browns 14–7. **Drive: 12 plays, 70 yards, 6:58.**

Third quarter

- CLE – Corey Coleman 2-yard pass from DeShone Kizer (Zane Gonzalez kick), 2:59. Browns 21–7. **Drive: 9 plays, 88 yards, 4:31.**

Fourth quarter

- GB – Jamaal Williams 1-yard run (Mason Crosby kick), 12:54. Browns 21–14. **Drive: 13 plays, 75 yards, 4:59.**
- GB – Davante Adams 1-yard pass from Brett Hundley (Mason Crosby kick), 0:17. Tied 21–21. **Drive: 7 plays, 25 yards, 2:20.**

Overtime

- GB – Davante Adams 25-yard pass from Brett Hundley, 5:12. Packers 27–21. **Drive: 6 plays, 42 yards, 3:23.**

Top passers

- GB – Brett Hundley – 35/46, 265 yards, 3 TD
- CLE – DeShone Kizer – 20/28, 214 yards, 3 TD, 2 INT

Top rushers

- GB – Jamaal Williams – 15 rushes, 49 yards, TD
- CLE – Isaiah Crowell – 19 rushes, 121 yards

Top receivers

- GB – Davante Adams – 10 receptions, 84 yards, 2 TD
- CLE – Josh Gordon – 3 receptions, 69 yards, TD

The Packers were trailing the winless Cleveland Browns 14–7 in the third quarter. The Browns scored a touchdown to make it 21–7, but Hundley and the Packers responded with a touchdown drive of their own, making it 21–14. The Packers tied the game with 17 seconds left on a touchdown pass to Davante Adams. In overtime, Browns quarterback DeShone Kizer threw a costly interception to Josh Jones, and Adams took a screen pass to the end zone, improving the Packers record to 7–6 and setting the stage for Aaron Rodgers' comeback.

==== Week 15: at Carolina Panthers ====
Week 15: Green Bay Packers at Carolina Panthers – Game summary

Quarter	1	2	3	4	Total
Packers	7	7	3	7	**24**
**Panthers**	7	3	14	7	**31**

at Bank of America Stadium, Charlotte, North Carolina

- Date: December 17
- Game time: 1:00 p.m. EST/12:00 p.m. CST
- Game weather: 51 °F (11 °C), partly cloudy
- Game attendance: 74,447
- Referee: Craig Wrolstad
- TV announcers (Fox): Joe Buck, Troy Aikman and Erin Andrews
- Recap, Gamebook

Game information

First quarter

- CAR – Christian McCaffrey 7-yard pass from Cam Newton (Graham Gano kick), 6:02. Panthers 7–0. **Drive: 15 plays, 85 yards, 7:35.**
- GB – Davante Adams 13-yard pass from Aaron Rodgers (Mason Crosby kick), 0:04. Tied 7–7. **Drive: 11 plays, 75 yards, 5:57.**

Second quarter

- CAR – Graham Gano 33-yard field goal, 9:06. Panthers 10–7. **Drive: 12 plays, 61 yards, 5:58.**
- GB – Randall Cobb 33-yard pass from Aaron Rodgers (Mason Crosby kick), 0:39. Packers 14–10. **Drive: 4 plays, 58 yards, 1:29.**

Third quarter

- CAR – Greg Olsen 30-yard pass from Cam Newton (Graham Gano kick), 11:39. Panthers 17–14. **Drive: 7 plays, 73 yards, 3:26.**
- CAR – Damiere Byrd 18-yard pass from Cam Newton (Graham Gano kick), 7:28. Panthers 24–14. **Drive: 7 plays, 49 yards, 3:28.**
- GB – Mason Crosby 28-yard field goal, 1:27. Panthers 24–17. **Drive: 12 plays, 47 yards, 3:51.**

Fourth quarter

- CAR – Damiere Byrd 13-yard pass from Cam Newton (Graham Gano kick), 12:29. Panthers 31–17. **Drive: 8 plays, 75 yards, 3:59.**
- GB – Richard Rodgers 24-yard pass from Aaron Rodgers (Mason Crosby kick), 2:48. Panthers 31–24. **Drive: 6 plays, 76 yards, 1:11.**
- GB – Aaron Rodgers – 26/45, 290 yards, 3 TD, 3 INT
- CAR – Cam Newton – 20/31, 242 yards, 4 TD

Top rushers

- GB – Aaron Jones – 3 rushes, 47 yards
- CAR – Christian McCaffrey – 12 rushes, 63 yards

Top receivers

- GB – Randall Cobb – 7 receptions, 84 yards, TD
- CAR – Greg Olsen – 9 receptions, 116 yards, TD

Aaron Rodgers returned to the field for the first time since being injured in Week 6. His three touchdowns, however, were negated by his three interceptions as the Panthers won 31–24 by a forced fumble in the game's final minute. With Atlanta beating Tampa Bay the next day, the Green Bay Packers were eliminated from the playoffs for the first time since 2008.

Despite the return of Rodgers, he had little on-field impact. He threw 3 touchdown passes, but he was also picked off 3 times and got sacked 3 times in the loss.

==== Week 16: vs. Minnesota Vikings ====
Week 16: Minnesota Vikings at Green Bay Packers – Game summary

Quarter	1	2	3	4	Total
**Vikings**	10	0	3	3	**16**
Packers	0	0	0	0	**0**

at Lambeau Field, Green Bay, Wisconsin

- Date: December 23
- Game time: 7:30 p.m. CST
- Game weather: 10 °F (−12 °C), clear and cold
- Game attendance: 78,092
- Referee: Carl Cheffers
- TV announcers (NBC): Al Michaels, Cris Collinsworth and Michele Tafoya
- Recap, Gamebook

Game information

First quarter

- MIN – Kai Forbath 49-yard field goal, 8:33. Vikings 3–0. **Drive: 9 plays, 39 yards, 3:50.**
- MIN – Stefon Diggs 4-yard pass from Case Keenum (Kai Forbath kick), 1:02. Vikings 10–0. **Drive: 5 plays, 68 yards, 2:09.**

Second quarter

- No scoring plays

Third quarter

- MIN – Kai Forbath 49-yard field goal, 8:33. Vikings 13–0. **Drive: 12 plays, 62 yards, 6:12.**

Fourth quarter

- MIN – Kai Forbath 27-yard field goal, 3:00. Vikings 16–0. **Drive: 4 plays, 5 yards, 1:00.**
- MIN – Case Keenum – 14/25, 139 yards, TD
- GB – Brett Hundley – 17/40, 130 yards, 2 INT

Top rushers

- MIN – Latavius Murray – 21 rushes, 69 yards
- GB – Jamaal Williams – 15 rushes, 58 yards

Top receivers

- MIN – Stefon Diggs – 5 receptions, 60 yards, TD
- GB – Michael Clark – 3 receptions, 36 yards

This Christmas edition of Sunday Night Football was anticipated to be a critical NFC North game before the season, however, with Aaron Rodgers back on IR and the Packers eliminated, the game did not live up to such standards.

The Vikings played conservatively all night, and like the Ravens, won the game with expert field position and forced Brett Hundley to make mistakes. He threw two interceptions to Harrison Smith. The Packers were shut out twice at home in the same season for the first time since 2006, and their record dropped to 7–8. The Packers were swept by the Vikings for the first time since 2009.

==== Week 17: at Detroit Lions ====
Week 17: Green Bay Packers at Detroit Lions – Game summary

Quarter	1	2	3	4	Total
Packers	3	0	0	8	**11**
**Lions**	3	17	7	8	**35**

at Ford Field, Detroit, Illinois

- Date: December 31
- Game time: 1:00 p.m. EST/12:00 p.m. CST
- Game weather: Played indoors (dome stadium)
- Game attendance: 62,501
- Referee: Pete Morelli
- TV announcers (Fox): Dick Stockton, Mark Schlereth and Shannon Spake
- Recap, Gamebook

Game information

First quarter

- GB – Mason Crosby 78-yard field goal, 5:04. Packers 3–0. **Drive: 8 plays, 45 yards, 3:58.**
- DET – Matt Prater 28-yard field goal, 3:06. Tied 3–3. **Drive: 5 plays, 64 yards, 1:57.**

Second quarter

- DET – Kenny Golladay 54-yard pass from Matthew Stafford (Matt Prater kick), 7:35. Lions 10–3. **Drive: 9 plays, 88 yards, 3:54.**
- DET – Marvin Jones 3-yard pass from Matthew Stafford (Matt Prater kick), 2:24. Lions 17–3. **Drive: 2 plays, 14 yards, 0:42.**
- DET – Matt Prater 30-yard field goal, 0:35. Lions 20–3. **Drive: 5 plays, 23 yards, 1:10.**

Third quarter

- DET – Golden Tate 71-yard pass from Matthew Stafford (Matt Prater kick), 1:50. Lions 27–3. **Drive: 1 plays, 71 yards, 0:12.**

Fourth quarter

- GB – Randall Cobb 17-yard pass from Brett Hundley (Brett Hundley–Randall Cobb pass), 11:53. Lions 27–11. **Drive: 8 plays, 75 yards, 5:11.**
- DET – Ameer Abdullah 7-yard run (Matthew Stafford–Golden Tate pass), 7:23. Lions 35–11. **Drive: 7 plays, 59 yards, 6:11.**

Top passers

- GB – Brett Hundley – 14/24, 172 yards, TD, 2 INT
- DET – Matthew Stafford – 20/29, 323 yards, 3 TD

Top rushers

- GB – Jamaal Williams – 22 rushes, 82 yards
- DET – Tion Green – 9 rushes, 21 yards

Top receivers

- GB – Trevor Davis – 3 receptions, 56 yards
- DET – Golden Tate – 7 receptions, 104 yards, TD

With a final score of 11–35 in a blowout loss, the Packers were swept by the Lions for the first time since 1991. Green Bay lost 3 straight games to close out a miserable season. The loss all but sealed the team's first losing season since 2008, with a disappointing 7–9 record.

=== Standings ===
==== Division ====
NFC North
	W	L	T	PCT	DIV	CONF	PF	PA	STK
^{(2)} Minnesota Vikings	13	3	0	.813	5–1	10–2	382	252	W3
Detroit Lions	9	7	0	.563	5–1	8–4	410	376	W1
Green Bay Packers	7	9	0	.438	2–4	5–7	320	384	L3
Chicago Bears	5	11	0	.313	0–6	1–11	264	320	L1

==== Conference ====
NFC
#	Team	Division	W	L	T	PCT	DIV	CONF	SOS	SOV	STK
**Division leaders**
1 (Note: Philadelphia claimed the No. 1 seed over Minnesota based on winning percentage vs. common opponents. Philadelphia's cumulative record against Carolina, Chicago, the Los Angeles Rams and Washington was 5–0, compared to Minnesota's 4–1 cumulative record against the same four teams.)	Philadelphia Eagles	East	13	3	0	.813	5–1	10–2	.461	.433	L1
2	Minnesota Vikings	North	13	3	0	.813	5–1	10–2	.492	.447	W3
3 (Note: LA Rams claimed the No. 3 seed over New Orleans based on head-to-head victory.)	Los Angeles Rams	West	11	5	0	.688	4–2	7–5	.504	.460	L1
4 (Note: New Orleans clinched the NFC South division over Carolina based on head-to-head sweep.)	New Orleans Saints	South	11	5	0	.688	4–2	8–4	.535	.483	L1
**Wild Cards**
5	Carolina Panthers	South	11	5	0	.688	3–3	7–5	.539	.500	L1
6	Atlanta Falcons	South	10	6	0	.625	4–2	9–3	.543	.475	W1
**Did not qualify for the postseason**
7 (Note: Detroit finished ahead of Dallas and Seattle based on conference record, while Seattle finished ahead of Dallas based on head-to-head victory.)	Detroit Lions	North	9	7	0	.563	5–1	8–4	.496	.368	W1
8	Seattle Seahawks	West	9	7	0	.563	4–2	7–5	.492	.444	L1
9	Dallas Cowboys	East	9	7	0	.563	5–1	7–5	.496	.438	W1
10	Arizona Cardinals	West	8	8	0	.500	3–3	5–7	.488	.406	W2
11 (Note: Green Bay finished ahead of Washington based on record vs. common opponents. Green Bay's cumulative record against Dallas, Minnesota, New Orleans and Seattle was 2–3, compared to Washington's 1–4 cumulative record against the same four teams.)	Green Bay Packers	North	7	9	0	.438	2–4	5–7	.539	.357	L3
12	Washington Redskins	East	7	9	0	.438	1–5	5–7	.539	.429	L1
13	San Francisco 49ers	West	6	10	0	.375	1–5	3–9	.512	.438	W5
14 (Note: Tampa Bay finished ahead of Chicago based on head-to-head victory.)	Tampa Bay Buccaneers	South	5	11	0	.313	1–5	3–9	.555	.375	W1
15	Chicago Bears	North	5	11	0	.313	0–6	1–11	.559	.500	L1
16	New York Giants	East	3	13	0	.188	1–5	1–11	.531	.458	W1
**Tiebreakers** (Note: When breaking ties for three or more teams under the NFL's rules, they are first broken within divisions, then comparing only the highest-ranked remaining team from each division.)

== Statistics ==
=== Statistical leaders ===
Statistic	Player(s)	Value
Passing yards	Brett Hundley	1,836
Passing touchdowns	Aaron Rodgers	16
Rushing yards	Jamaal Williams	556
Rushing touchdowns	Aaron Jones; Jamaal Williams	4
Receptions	Davante Adams	74
Receiving yards	Davante Adams	885
Receiving touchdowns	Davante Adams	10
Kickoff return yards	Trevor Davis	707
Punt return yards	Trevor Davis	278
Tackles	Blake Martinez	144
Sacks	Clay Matthews III	8.5
Interceptions	Damarious Randall	4

=== League rankings ===
Category	Total yards	Yards per game	NFL rank (out of 32)
Passing offense	3167	197.9	25
Rushing offense	1724	107.8	17
Total offense	4891	305.7	26
Passing defense	3789	236.8	23
Rushing defense	1793	112.1	17
Total defense	5582	348.9	22

Statistical values are correct at the end of the season

== Awards ==
Recipient	Award(s)
Davante Adams	Probowler
David Bakhtiari	2017 All-Pro second team
Mike Daniels	Probowler
Aaron Rodgers	Week 5: NFC Offensive Player of the Week
Dean Lowry	Week 13: NFC Defensive Player of the Week
Trevor Davis	Week 14: NFC Special Teams Player of the Week
