= Michael Clark (wide receiver) =

American football player (born 1995)

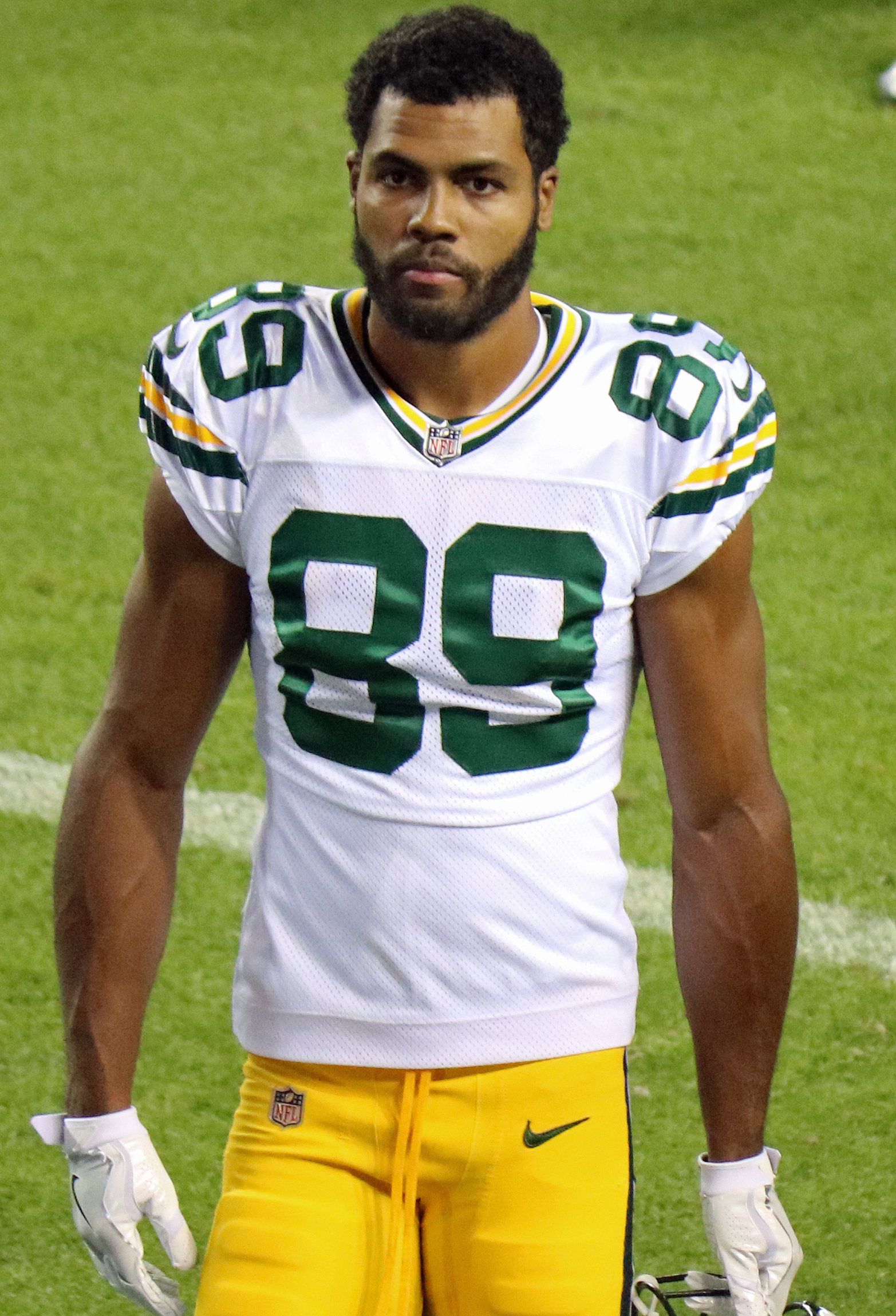
- Clark in 2017

No. 89
- Position: Wide receiver

Personal information
- Born: October 26, 1995 (age 31); Salem, Massachusetts, U.S.
- Listed height: 6 ft 6 in (1.98 m)
- Listed weight: 217 lb (98 kg)

Career information
- High school: Lakewood (St. Petersburg, Florida)
- College: Marshall (2015–2016)
- NFL draft: 2017: undrafted

Career history
- Green Bay Packers (2017)

Career NFL statistics
- Receptions: 4
- Receiving yards: 41
- Receiving touchdowns: 0
- Stats at Pro Football Reference

Michael Clark (born October 26, 1995) is an American former professional football player who was a wide receiver in the National Football League (NFL). He played college football for the Marshall Thundering Herd, and was signed by the Green Bay Packers as an undrafted free agent in 2017.

== College career ==
Clark originally played basketball at St. Francis (PA) during the 2014–15 season. He then transferred and played college football for the Marshall Thundering Herd.

=== College statistics ===
==== Football ====
Year	Team	Games		Receiving				
Year	Team	G	GS	Rec	Yds	Avg	Lng	TD
2015	Marshall	Redshirted (redshirt)						
2016	Marshall	12	12	37	632	17.1	83	5
Total		12	12	37	632	17.1	83	5
Source: HerdZone.com

==== Basketball ====
Year	Team	GP	GS	MPG	FG%	3P%	FT%	RPG	APG	SPG	BPG	PPG
2014–15	Saint Francis	12	0	3.6	.250	.000	.333	.5	.0	.2	.1	.5

== Professional career ==
Pre-draft measurables
Height	Weight	Arm length	Hand span	40-yard dash	10-yard split	20-yard split	20-yard shuttle	Three-cone drill	Vertical jump	Broad jump	Bench press	Wonderlic
6 ft 5 5/8 in (1.97 m)	217 lb (98 kg)	32 7/8 in (0.84 m)	9 3/8 in (0.24 m)	4.53 s	1.55 s	2.60 s	4.31 s	7.54 s	33 in (0.84 m)	10 ft 6 in (3.20 m)	17 reps	15
All values are from Pro Day

After going undrafted in the 2017 NFL draft, Clark signed with the Green Bay Packers as an undrafted free agent on May 5, 2017. He was waived by the Packers on September 2, 2017 and was signed to the practice squad the next day. He was promoted to the active roster on December 1, 2017.

Clark was re-signed by the Packers on March 14, 2018.

On July 25, 2018, the Packers placed Clark on the reserve/did not report list after failing to report to training camp. It was then revealed that Clark had announced his retirement from the NFL.

=== NFL career statistics ===
Year	Team	Games		Receiving					Fumbles	
Year	Team	GP	GS	Rec	Yds	Avg	Lng	TD	FUM	Lost
2017	GB	2	0	4	41	10.3	19	0	0	0
Total		2	0	4	41	10.3	19	0	0	0
Source: NFL.com
