= Devante Mays =

American football player (born 1994)

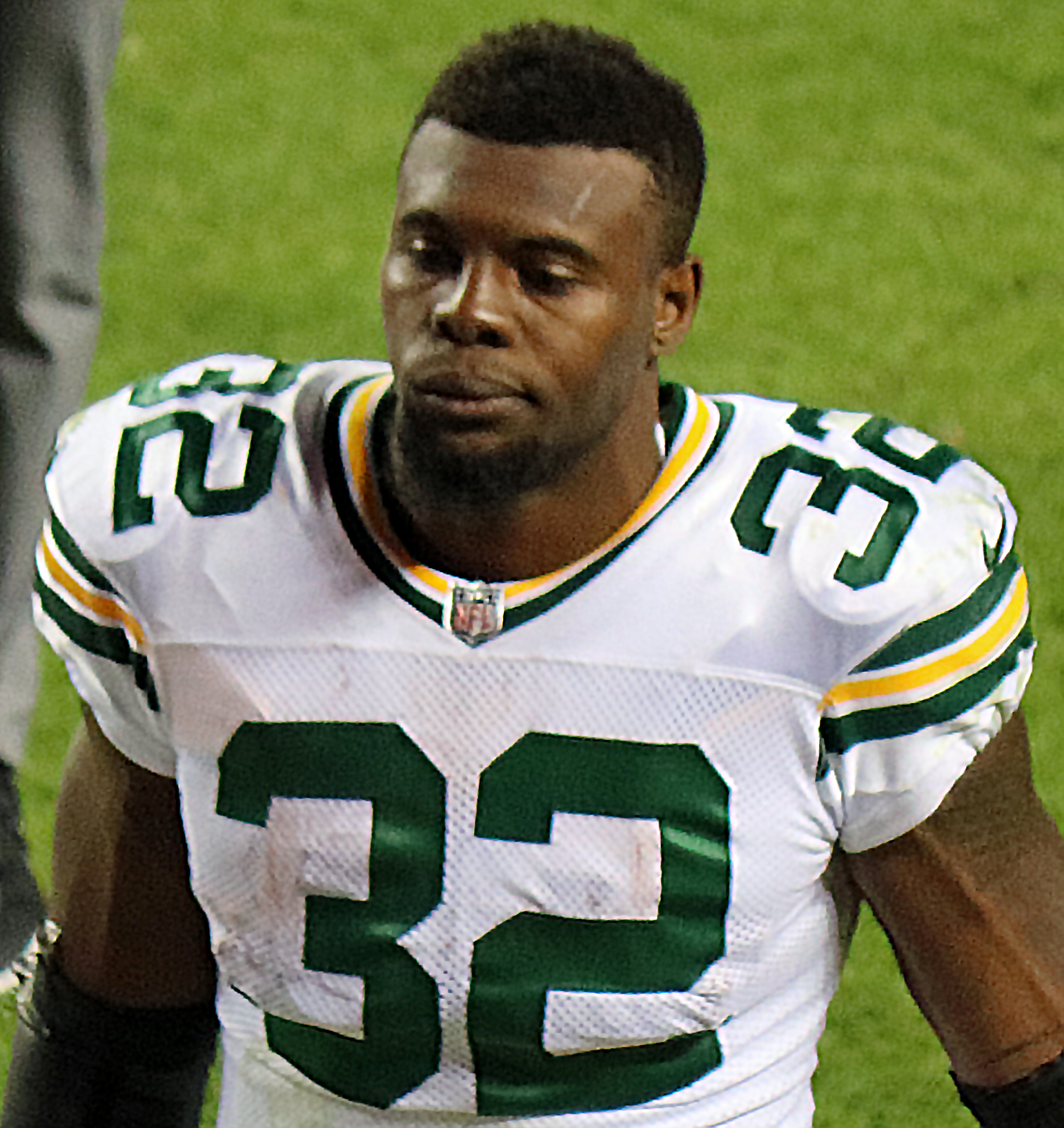
- Mays with the Green Bay Packers in 2017

No. 32
- Position: Running back

Personal information
- Born: May 26, 1994 (age 32); Livingston, Texas, U.S.
- Listed height: 5 ft 11 in (1.80 m)
- Listed weight: 237 lb (108 kg)

Career information
- High school: Livingston
- College: Utah State
- NFL draft: 2017: 7th round, 238th overall pick

Career history
- Green Bay Packers (2017); Cleveland Browns (2018–2019)*; Jacksonville Jaguars (2019)
- * Offseason or practice squad member only

Career NFL statistics
- Rushing attempts: 4
- Rushing yards: 1
- Stats at Pro Football Reference

Devante Roshard Mays (born May 26, 1994) is an American former professional football player who was a running back in the National Football League (NFL). He played college football at Tyler Junior College and Blinn College before transferring to the Utah State Aggies.

== Early life ==
Mays was born to Mark and Elwanda Mays in Livingston, Texas, and is one of ten children the couple had together. He attended Livingston High School where he played football, ran track, and competed in power-lifting. During his senior year on the football team, he led the team to a 5–0 record and was averaging over 10 yards a carry. However, during the sixth game of the year he suffered a foot injury that ended his season prematurely. He finished the season with 600 rushing yards on 58 carries with 10 touchdowns. His injury in addition to a non-qualifying academic status left him no recruiting offers despite his performance.

== College career ==
=== Community college ===
Mays graduated from Livingston High School and with the lack of recruiting offers on the table, chose to attend and play for Tyler Junior College. During his first carry with the school, he ran for a touchdown. However, his time there proved to be short lived as an off the field incident lead to his dismissal from the school and the team. Feeling that his football career was over, he took a job working construction and taking courses at a nearby campus of his hometown.

After a chance meeting with his former high school coach, he was able to return to the gridiron after a call earned him an invitation to a scouting combine at Blinn College, which invited him to return to school. He redshirted his first year with the team. However, following that season the head coach of the team, Ronny Feldon was fired and Mays found himself sitting on the bench without an opportunity to play in a very pass-oriented offense. Almost to the point where he quit the team, he soon received his opportunity as two other running backs were removed from the team leaving him as the de facto starter. During this time he ran for 557 rushing yards and three touchdowns in six games, allowing him to catch the attention of Utah State.

=== Utah State ===
Following a visit to the Utah State University campus, Mays claimed he "fell in love with the place" and after receiving interest from a few more places decided to commit to the school. He opted to major in interdisciplinary studies, emphasizing health and wellness. As a junior with the team, he played in all 13 games and started six of them. He found success early on the field as his first NCAA Division I run went for 36 yards. He finished the year with 165 carries for 966 yards and nine touchdowns, leading the team in every category.

Mays continued on for his senior year with the team by playing in six games and starting two of them, but was limited after suffering a knee injury against USC in the second game of the season.

== Professional career ==
=== Pre-draft ===
Mays was projected as a seventh round pick by Lance Zierlein of NFL.com. He was praised for his physical stature and his hard running stance, being willing to power through contact. He was also praised for his attitude and work ethic. Zierlein also expressed concern about his reoccurring injury history and his hesitation for hitting certain running lanes.

External videos
- Mays gets drafted by Green Bay

Pre-draft measurables
Height	Weight	40-yard dash	10-yard split	20-yard split	20-yard shuttle	Three-cone drill	Vertical jump	Broad jump	Bench press	Wonderlic
5 10 3/8	230 lb (104 kg)	4.52 s	1.62 s	2.60 s	4.53 s	7.43 s	40 1/2	10 ft 9 in (3.28 m)	22 reps	18
All values are from Pro Day

=== Green Bay Packers ===
Mays was selected by the Green Bay Packers in the seventh round, 238th overall, in the 2017 NFL draft. He was signed to a four-year contract on May 5, 2017.

On November 19, against the Baltimore Ravens, Mays had his first three career carries, which totaled −1 yard. In the season finale against the Detroit Lions, he had one carry for two yards. Overall, in his rookie season, he appeared in eight games and had four carries for one rushing yard to go along with three receptions for no receiving yards.

On September 1, 2018, Mays was placed on injured reserve, and was later released with an injury settlement.

=== Cleveland Browns ===
Mays was signed to the practice squad of the Cleveland Browns on October 23, 2018. The Browns signed Mays to a futures contract on January 2, 2019. Mays was released by the Browns on May 13, 2019.

=== Jacksonville Jaguars ===
On July 31, 2019, Mays was signed by the Jacksonville Jaguars. He was placed on injured reserve on August 31, 2019.

== NFL career statistics ==
=== Regular season ===
Year	Team	GP	GS	Rushing					Receiving					Fumbles	
Year	Team	GP	GS	Att	Yds	Avg	Lng	TD	Rec	Yds	Avg	Lng	TD	FUM	Lost
2017	GB	8	0	4	1	0.3	2	0	3	0	0.0	0	0	2	1
Total		8	0	4	1	0.3	2	0	3	0	0.0	0	0	2	1
Source: NFL.com
