= Justin Vogel =

American gridiron football player (born 1993)

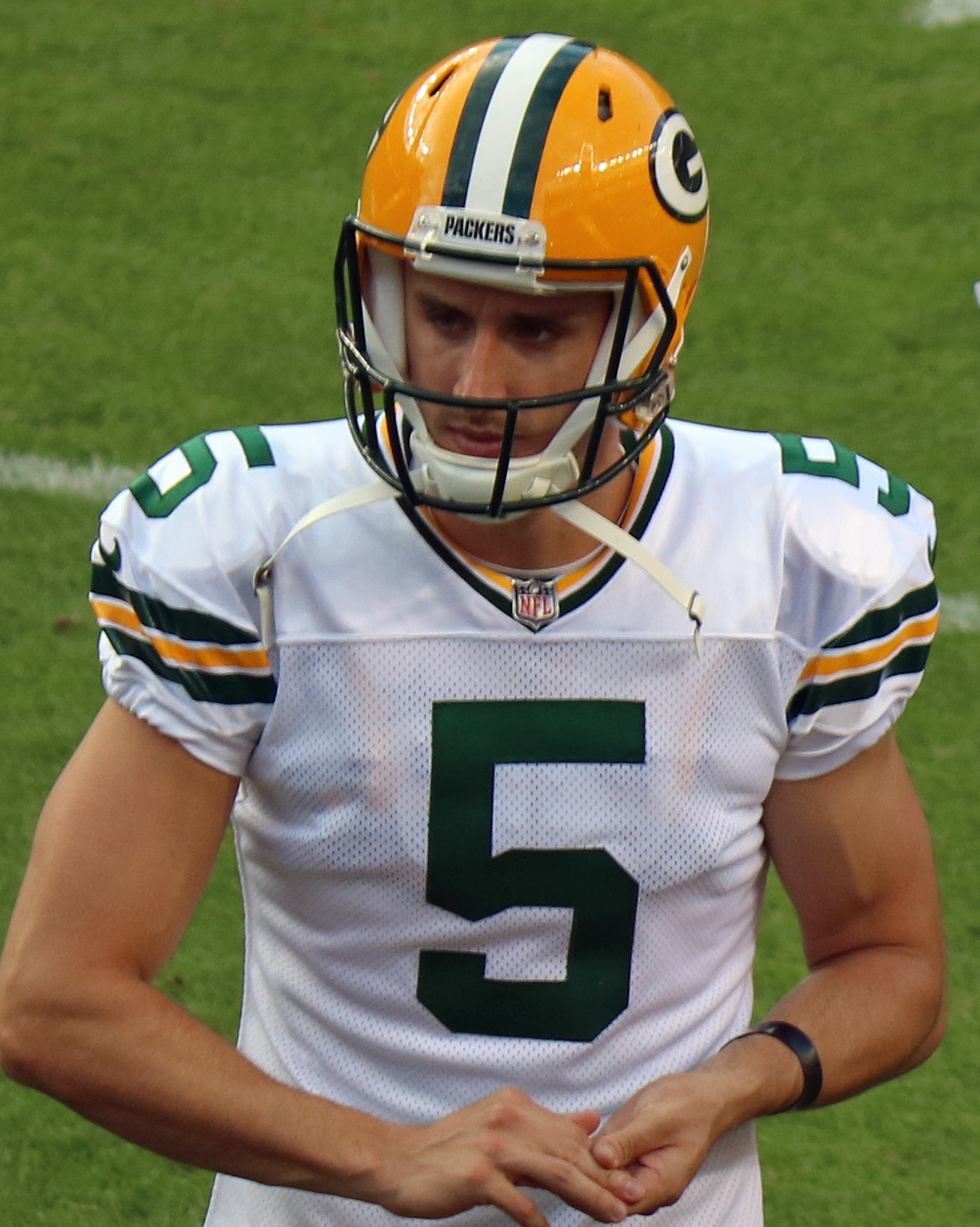
- Vogel with the Green Bay Packers in 2017

No. 5, 8, 1
- Position: Punter

Personal information
- Born: October 14, 1993 (age 33); Tampa, Florida, U.S.
- Listed height: 6 ft 4 in (1.93 m)
- Listed weight: 219 lb (99 kg)

Career information
- High school: Berkeley Preparatory School (Tampa)
- College: Miami (FL)
- NFL draft: 2017: undrafted

Career history
- Green Bay Packers (2017); Cleveland Browns (2018)*; San Francisco 49ers (2019)*; Denver Broncos (2019)*; New York Guardians (2020)
- * Offseason or practice squad member only

Awards and highlights
- Second-team All-ACC (2016)

Career NFL statistics
- Punts: 71
- Punting yards: 3,155
- Average punt: 44.4
- Inside 20: 19
- Stats at Pro Football Reference

Paul Justin Vogel (born October 14, 1993) is an American former professional football player who was a punter in the National Football League (NFL). He signed with the Green Bay Packers as an undrafted free agent in 2017. He played college football for the Miami Hurricanes.

== Professional career ==
Pre-draft measurables
| Height | Weight | Arm length | Hand span | 40-yard dash | 10-yard split | 20-yard split | Vertical jump | Wonderlic |
|---|---|---|---|---|---|---|---|---|
| 6 4 3/8 | 219 lb (99 kg) | 32 1/2 | 9 in (0.23 m) | 4.70 s | 1.65 s | 2.72 s | 34 in (0.86 m) | 26 |
All values are from NFL Combine

=== Green Bay Packers ===
After going undrafted in the 2017 NFL draft, Vogel signed with the Green Bay Packers on May 5, 2017. He received interest from multiple teams, ultimately he chose the Packers because he felt he'd have an "equal chance and equal opportunity to compete." Vogel was expected to compete with veteran Jake Schum for the starting punting job. However, Schum was unable to participate due to injury, leading to his release on June 1, 2017. Vogel averaged 45.7 yards per punt with a long of 60 in the preseason, earning him a spot on the Packers' 53-man roster. He played in all 16 regular season games, recording 71 punts for 3,155 yards for an average of 44.4 yards. He also set the single-season franchise record for net punting average with 41.6 yards per punt and was selected to be a 2018 Pro Bowl alternate.

On May 4, 2018, Vogel was released by the Packers after the team drafted punter J. K. Scott.

=== Cleveland Browns ===
On May 7, 2018, Vogel was claimed off waivers by the Cleveland Browns. He was waived on September 1, 2018.

=== San Francisco 49ers ===
On March 19, 2019, Vogel signed a one-year contract with the San Francisco 49ers. He was waived on April 29, 2019.

=== Denver Broncos ===
On July 23, 2019, Vogel was signed by the Denver Broncos, but was waived four days later.

=== New York Guardians ===
Vogel was selected by the New York Guardians in the 2020 XFL Supplemental Draft on November 22, 2019. He had his contract terminated when the league suspended operations on April 10, 2020.

=== Career statistics ===
| Year | Team | GP | Punting | | | | | | | | | | | | | | |
| Year | Team | GP | Punts | Yds | Net Yds | Lng | Avg | Net Avg | Blk | OOB | Dn | Ins20 | TB | FC | Ret | RetY | TD |
|---|---|---|---|---|---|---|---|---|---|---|---|---|---|---|---|---|---|
| 2017 | GB | 16 | 71 | 3,155 | 2,951 | 62 | 44.4 | 41.6 | 0 | 8 | 8 | 19 | 2 | 24 | 29 | 164 | 0 |
| Total | | 16 | 71 | 3,155 | 2,951 | 62 | 44.4 | 41.6 | 0 | 8 | 8 | 19 | 2 | 24 | 29 | 164 | 0 |
Source: NFL.com
