= Emanuel Byrd =

American football player (born 1994)

Profile
- Position: Tight end

Personal information
- Born: December 9, 1994 (age 31); Albany, Georgia, U.S.
- Listed height: 6 ft 2 in (1.88 m)
- Listed weight: 236 lb (107 kg)

Career information
- High school: Albany
- College: Marshall
- NFL draft: 2017: undrafted

Career history
- Kansas City Chiefs (2017)*; Green Bay Packers (2017)
- * Offseason or practice squad member only

Career NFL statistics
- Receptions: 2
- Receiving yards: 31
- Receiving touchdowns: 0
- Stats at Pro Football Reference

Emanuel Augustus Byrd (born December 9, 1994) is an American former professional football player who was a tight end in the National Football League (NFL). He played college football for the Marshall Thundering Herd, and was signed by the Kansas City Chiefs as an undrafted free agent in 2017.

== College career ==
Byrd played quarterback and tight end for Georgia Military College in 2013 and 2014. He transferred to attended Marshall University, where he played tight end for the Thundering Herd in 2015 and 2016.

=== College statistics ===
Year	Team	GP	Receiving				
Year	Team	GP	Rec	Yds	Avg	Lng	TD
2015	Marshall	10	19	214	11.3	41	1
2016	Marshall	11	26	242	9.3	37	3
Total		21	45	456	10.1	41	4
Source: HerdZone.com

== Professional career ==
Pre-draft measurables
Height	Weight	Arm length	Hand span	40-yard dash	10-yard split	20-yard split	20-yard shuttle	Three-cone drill	Vertical jump	Broad jump	Bench press
6 ft 2 1/8 in (1.88 m)	239 lb (108 kg)	33 in (0.84 m)	9 3/8 in (0.24 m)	4.66 s	1.58 s	2.62 s	4.51 s	7.37 s	33 5/8 in (0.85 m)	9 ft 8 in (2.95 m)	20 reps
All values are from Pro Day

=== Kansas City Chiefs ===
After going undrafted in the 2017 NFL draft, Byrd signed with the Kansas City Chiefs on May 9, 2017. On July 31, 2017, he was waived by the Chiefs.

=== Green Bay Packers ===
On August 5, 2017, Byrd signed with the Green Bay Packers. He was waived by the Packers on September 2, 2017. He was re-signed to the practice squad on November 3, 2017. He was promoted to the active roster on December 26, 2017.

On September 1, 2018, Byrd was waived by the Packers.

== NFL career statistics ==
=== Regular season ===
Year	Team	GP	GS	Receiving					Rushing					Fumbles	
Year	Team	GP	GS	Rec	Yds	Avg	Lng	TD	Att	Yds	Avg	Lng	TD	FUM	Lost
2017	GB	1	0	2	31	15.5	29	0	0	0	0.0	0	0	0	0
Total		1	0	2	31	15.5	29	0	0	0	0.0	0	0	0	0
Source: NFL.com
