= Josh Hawkins =

American football player (born 1993)

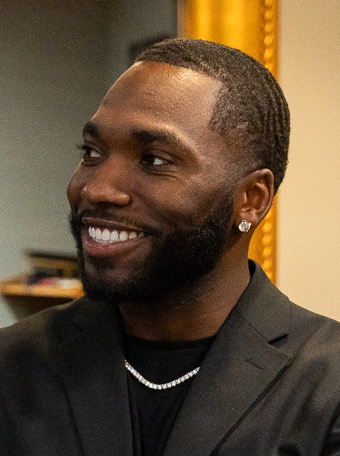
- Hawkins in 2025

No. 28
- Position: Cornerback

Personal information
- Born: January 23, 1993 (age 33); Winston-Salem, North Carolina, U.S.
- Listed height: 5 ft 10 in (1.78 m)
- Listed weight: 189 lb (86 kg)

Career information
- High school: Robert B. Glenn (Kernersville, North Carolina)
- College: East Carolina
- NFL draft: 2016: undrafted

Career history
- Green Bay Packers (2016–2017); Carolina Panthers (2018); Kansas City Chiefs (2018)*; Philadelphia Eagles (2018); Dallas Renegades (2020); Atlanta Falcons (2020)*; Carolina Panthers (2020)*; Detroit Lions (2020)*; Arlington Renegades (2023)
- * Offseason or practice squad member only

Awards and highlights
- XFL champion (2023); Mid-season All-XFL (2020)

Career NFL statistics
- Total tackles: 43
- Forced fumbles: 1
- Pass deflections: 7
- Stats at Pro Football Reference

Joshua Rashard Hawkins (born January 23, 1993) is an American former professional football player who was a cornerback in the National Football League (NFL). He played college football for the East Carolina Pirates. Hawkins was signed by the Green Bay Packers as an undrafted free agent in 2016.

== Professional career ==
Pre-draft measurables
Height	Weight	40-yard dash	10-yard split	20-yard split	20-yard shuttle	Three-cone drill	Vertical jump	Broad jump	Bench press	Wonderlic
5 ft 10 in (1.78 m)	189 lb (86 kg)	4.39 s	1.51 s	2.52 s	4.09 s	7.22 s	40.5 in (1.03 m)	10 ft 5 in (3.18 m)	14 reps	7
All values are from Pro Day

=== Green Bay Packers ===
After going undrafted in the 2016 NFL draft, Hawkins signed with the Green Bay Packers on May 6, 2016. He recorded five tackles and two interceptions in the preseason, earning him a spot on the Packers' 53-man roster.

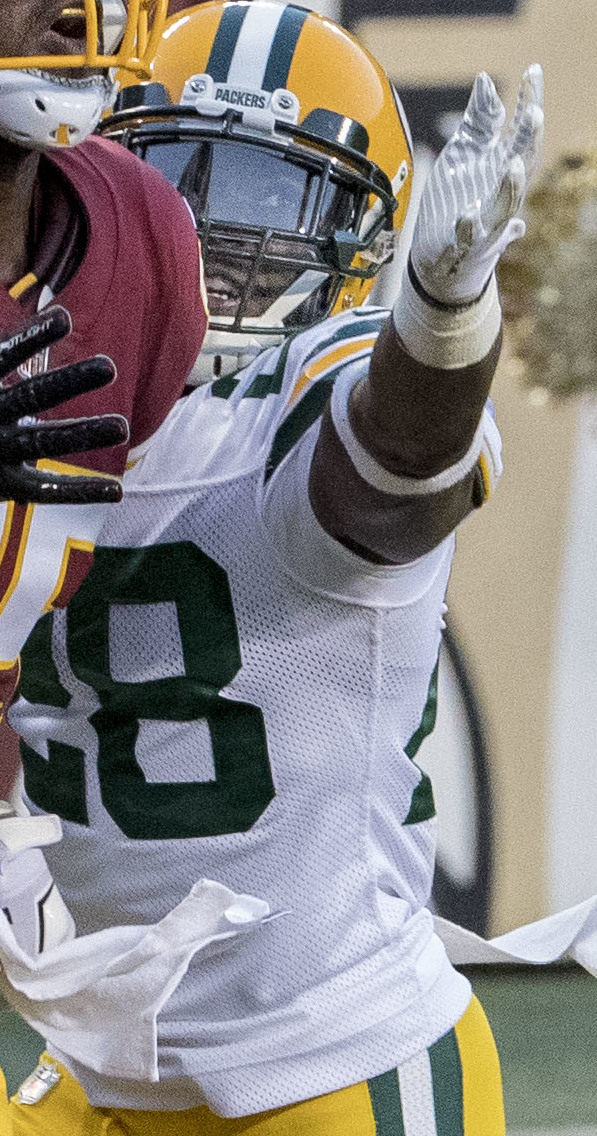
Josh Hawkins in 2017

On September 1, 2018, Hawkins was waived by the Packers.

=== Carolina Panthers (first stint) ===
On September 4, 2018, Hawkins was signed to the Carolina Panthers' practice squad. He was promoted to the active roster on September 22. Hawkins was waived by Carolina on November 14.

=== Kansas City Chiefs ===
On November 18, 2018, Hawkins was signed to the Kansas City Chiefs' practice squad. He was released by Kansas City on December 6.

=== Philadelphia Eagles ===
On December 11, 2018, Hawkins was signed to the Philadelphia Eagles' practice squad. He was promoted to the team's active roster on December 24.

Hawkins was waived by the Eagles during final roster cuts on August 30, 2019.

=== Dallas Renegades ===
Hawkins was selected by the Dallas Renegades of the XFL in the 2020 XFL draft. He had his contract terminated when the league suspended operations on April 10, 2020.

=== Atlanta Falcons ===
On April 15, 2020, Hawkins signed with the Atlanta Falcons. He was waived by Atlanta on September 5, and re–signed to the team's practice squad the next day. Hawkins was released from the practice squad on September 15.

=== Carolina Panthers (second stint) ===
On October 20, 2020, Hawkins was signed to the Carolina Panthers' practice squad. He was released by Carolina on October 26.

=== Detroit Lions ===
On December 29, 2020, Hawkins signed with the practice squad of the Detroit Lions.

=== Arlington Renegades ===
On November 17, 2022, Hawkins was selected by the Arlington Renegades of the XFL, returning to his former team in 2020. He was placed on the reserve list by the team on March 6, 2023, and activated on May 16. He was not part of the roster after the 2024 UFL dispersal draft on January 15, 2024.

== NFL career statistics ==
Regular season statistics
Year	Team	GP	GS	Tackles					Interceptions						Fumbles	
Year	Team	GP	GS	Total	Solo	Ast	Sck	SFTY	PD	Int	Yds	Avg	Lng	TD	FF	FR
2016	GB	11	0	5	5	0	0.0	0	1	0	0	0	0	0	0	0
2017	GB	15	3	37	27	10	0.0	0	6	0	0	0	0	0	1	0
2018	CAR	5	0	0	0	0	0.0	0	0	0	0	0	0	0	0	0
2018	PHI	1	0	0	0	0	0.0	0	0	0	0	0	0	0	0	0
Total		26	3	42	32	10	0.0	0	7	0	0	0	0	0	1	0
Source: NFL.com
