= Jordan McCray =

American football player (born 1992)

No. 64 – Orlando Pirates
- Position: Center
- Roster status: Active

Personal information
- Born: May 31, 1992 (age 34); Miami, Florida, U.S.
- Listed height: 6 ft 1 in (1.85 m)
- Listed weight: 295 lb (134 kg)

Career information
- High school: Miami Southridge
- College: UCF
- NFL draft: 2014: undrafted

Career history
- Green Bay Packers (2014)*; Minnesota Vikings (2014–2015)*; Carolina Panthers (2015)*; Orlando Predators (2016); Cleveland Gladiators (2017); Baltimore Brigade (2018); Chicago Bears (2019)*; Orlando Apollos (2019); Tampa Bay Vipers (2020); Massachusetts Pirates (2021); Birmingham Stallions (2022); San Antonio Brahmas (2023); Memphis Showboats (2023–2024); Massachusetts / Orlando Pirates (2025–present)
- * Offseason or practice squad member only

Awards and highlights
- First-team All-Arena (2018); First-team All-IFL (2021); IFL champion (2021); USFL champion (2022)
- Stats at Pro Football Reference

Jordan McCray (born May 31, 1992) is an American professional football center for the Orlando Pirates of the Indoor Football League (IFL). He played college football for the UCF Knights and was signed by the Green Bay Packers as an undrafted free agent in 2014.

== Professional career ==
Pre-draft measurables
Height	Weight	Arm length	Hand span	40-yard dash	10-yard split	20-yard split	20-yard shuttle	Three-cone drill	Vertical jump	Broad jump	Bench press
6 ft 2 7/8 in (1.90 m)	322 lb (146 kg)	31 in (0.79 m)	9 7/8 in (0.25 m)	5.53 s	1.86 s	3.12 s	4.93 s	7.57 s	27.5 in (0.70 m)	8 ft 4 in (2.54 m)	33 reps
All values from Pro Day

=== Green Bay Packers ===
After going undrafted in the 2014 NFL draft, McCray signed with the Green Bay Packers on May 12, 2014. On August 30, 2014, he was released by the Packers during final team cuts.

=== Minnesota Vikings ===
McCray ended up signing with the Minnesota Vikings on December 17, 2014. Sometime later McCray was released.

=== Carolina Panthers ===
On May 11, 2015, McCray was signed by the Carolina Panthers. On September 5, 2015, he was released by the Panthers.

=== Arena Football League ===
McCray then joined the Arena Football League with the Orlando Predators, where McCray played with his twin Justin. On October 14, 2016, McCray was assigned to the Cleveland Gladiators during the dispersal draft. On March 22, 2018, he was placed on League Suspension, and on March 24, 2018, he was activated for the Baltimore Brigade.

=== Orlando Apollos ===
In 2018, McCray signed with the Orlando Apollos for the 2019 AAF season. But his season was cut short due to the AAF operations being suspended.

=== Chicago Bears ===
On June 13, 2019, McCray was signed by the Chicago Bears.

=== Tampa Bay Vipers ===
In October 2019, McCray was selected by the Tampa Bay Vipers in the 2020 XFL draft. He had his contract terminated when the league suspended operations on April 10, 2020.

=== Massachusetts Pirates ===
In 2021, McCray signed with the Massachusetts Pirates.

=== Birmingham Stallions ===
McCray was selected in the 20th round of the 2022 USFL draft by the Birmingham Stallions.

=== San Antonio Brahmas ===
The San Antonio Brahmas selected McCray in the seventh round of the 2023 XFL Supplemental Draft on January 1, 2023. He was placed on the reserve list by the team on February 15, 2023, and was released on April 3, 2023.

=== Memphis Showboats ===
McCray signed with the Memphis Showboats of the USFL on April 19, 2023. He re-signed with the team on August 27, 2024. He was released on January 22, 2025.

=== Massachusetts Pirates (second stint) ===
On February 12, 2025, McCray signed with the Massachusetts Pirates. He re-signed with the team on December 21, 2025.
