= Donatello Brown =

American football player (born 1991)

Profile
- Position: Cornerback

Personal information
- Born: May 15, 1991 (age 35); Kennesaw, Georgia, U.S.
- Listed height: 6 ft 0 in (1.83 m)
- Listed weight: 189 lb (86 kg)

Career information
- High school: North Cobb (Kennesaw, Georgia)
- College: Valdosta State
- NFL draft: 2017: undrafted

Career history
- Green Bay Packers (2017); Atlanta Legends (2019); Dallas Renegades (2020); Arlington Renegades (2023)*
- * Offseason or practice squad member only

Career NFL statistics
- Total tackles: 0
- Sacks: 0
- Pass deflections: 0
- Interceptions: 0
- Forced fumbles: 0
- Stats at Pro Football Reference

Donatello Brown (born May 15, 1991) is an American football cornerback. He played college football at Valdosta State. He is the uncle of wide receiver John Brown.

== Professional career ==
=== Green Bay Packers ===
Brown signed with the Green Bay Packers as an undrafted free agent on May 5, 2017. He was waived by the Packers on September 2, 2017 and was signed to the practice squad the next day. He was promoted to the active roster on November 17, 2017.

He was re-signed on March 12, 2018. After training camp, he was waived by the Packers on September 1, 2018.

=== Atlanta Legends ===
Brown signed with the Atlanta Legends of the Alliance of American Football for the 2019 season. The league ceased operations in April 2019.

=== Dallas/Arlington Renegades ===
Brown was drafted in the 9th round during phase four in the 2020 XFL draft by the Dallas Renegades. He had his contract terminated when the league suspended operations on April 10, 2020.

Brown was drafted again by the Renegades on Nov 16, 2022 in the 2023 XFL draft for the 2023 XFL season.

== NFL career statistics ==
=== Regular season ===
Year	Team	GP	GS	Tackles					Interceptions						Fumbles	
Year	Team	GP	GS	Total	Solo	Ast	Sck	SFTY	PDef	Int	Yds	Avg	Lng	TDs	FF	FR
2017	GB	4	0	0	0	0	0.0	0	0	0	0	0	0	0	0	0
Total		4	0	0	0	0	0.0	0	0	0	0	0	0	0	0	0
Source: NFL.com
