= Quinton Dial =

American football player (born 1990)

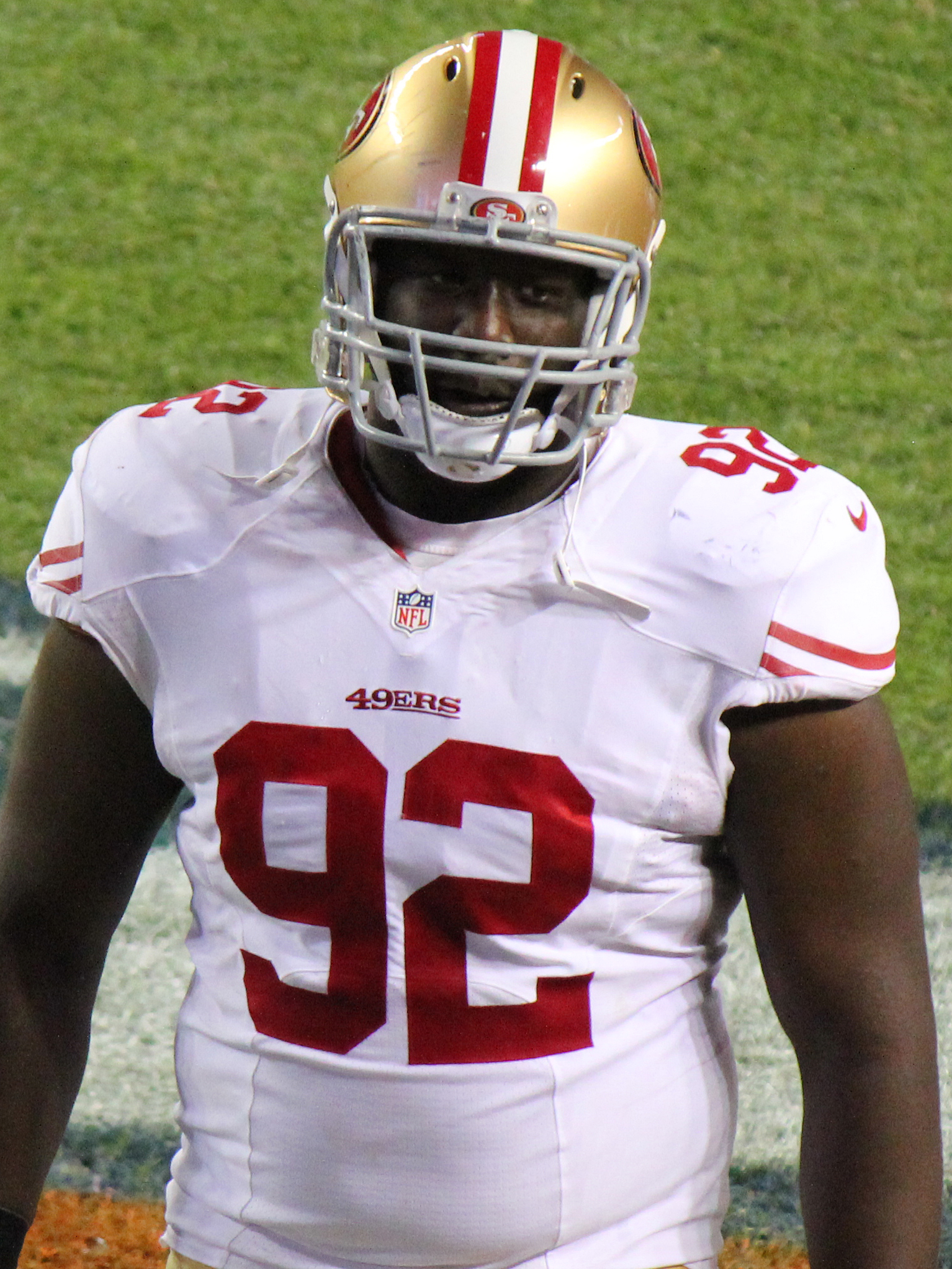
- Dial with the San Francisco 49ers in 2014

No. 71, 92, 91
- Position: Nose tackle

Personal information
- Born: July 21, 1990 (age 36); Birmingham, Alabama, U.S.
- Listed height: 6 ft 5 in (1.96 m)
- Listed weight: 318 lb (144 kg)

Career information
- High school: Clay-Chalkville (AL)
- College: East Mississippi CC (2009–2010); Alabama (2011–2012)
- NFL draft: 2013: 5th round, 157th overall pick

Career history
- San Francisco 49ers (2013–2016); Green Bay Packers (2017)

Awards and highlights
- 2× BCS national champion (2011, 2012)

Career NFL statistics
- Total tackles: 145
- Sacks: 4.5
- Pass deflections: 5
- Stats at Pro Football Reference

Quinton Arnaz Dial (born July 21, 1990) is an American former professional football player who was a nose tackle in the National Football League (NFL). He played college football for the Alabama Crimson Tide, and was selected by the San Francisco 49ers in the fifth round of the 2013 NFL draft. He also played for the Green Bay Packers.

== Early life ==
Dial attended Clay-Chalkville High School, where he played for the Clay-Chalkville Cougars high school football team. He was named as the 2008 ASWA's 6A Defensive Lineman of the Year. He was selected to the second-team All-State honors from The Birmingham News. He was ranked as the 33rd defensive tackle prospect by Rivals.com.

College recruiting
Name	Hometown	School	Height	Weight	40^{‡}	Commit date
Quinton Dial; Defensive tackle	Pinson, Alabama	Clay-Chalkville High School	6 ft 5 in (1.96 m)	308 lb (140 kg)	5.1	Jan 9, 2009
Quinton Dial; Defensive tackle	Recruit ratings: Scout: Rivals: 247Sports: (79)					
Overall recruit ranking: Scout: 48 (DT) Rivals: 33 (DT) 247Sports: 37 (DT) ESPN: 28 (DT)
‡ Refers to 40-yard dash; Note: In many cases, Scout, Rivals, 247Sports, On3, and ESPN may conflict in their listings of height, weight and 40 time.; In these cases, the average was taken. ESPN grades are on a 100-point scale.; Sources: "2009 Alabama Football Commitments". Rivals.; "2009 Alabama Football Recruiting Commits". Scout.; "Scout.com Team Recruiting Rankings". Scout.; "2009 Team Ranking". Rivals.com.

== College career ==
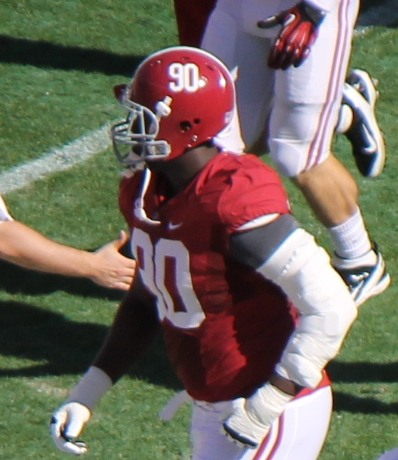
Dial playing for Alabama in 2012.

Dial played college football at East Mississippi Community College for his freshman and sophomore seasons. He spent his junior and senior seasons the University of Alabama. In his final two seasons at Alabama, He finished with a total of 46 tackles, 2.5 sacks. His ferocity of play was illustrated by a hit he made on Georgia quarterback, Aaron Murray, on January 12, 2012. During another victory for Nick Saban's Alabama team, the Georgia quarterback threw an interception and, for the duration of that play, he became a blocker. Quinton Dial recognized the opportunity and blocked the Georgia quarterback.

== Professional career ==
=== San Francisco 49ers ===
On April 27, 2013, Dial was selected in the fifth round of the 2013 NFL draft by the San Francisco 49ers. On August 27, 2013, he was placed on the reserve/non-football injury list. During his rookie season in 2013, he played in three games making one tackle. He helped the 49ers reached the NFC Championship where they lost to the eventual Super Bowl champion Seattle Seahawks. In 2014, he gained more playing time as a defensive tackle and played 14 games making 30 tackles with two sacks and one pass defended. In 2015, he started 15 games with 59 tackles, 2.5 sacks, and one pass defended.

On February 24, 2016, Dial signed a three-year contract extension with 49ers. Dial finished the 2016 season with 36 total tackles and two passes defensed in 14 games and 11 starts.

On September 2, 2017, Dial was released by the 49ers.

=== Green Bay Packers ===
On September 5, 2017, Dial signed with the Green Bay Packers. He played in 13 games and started two for Green Bay in the 2017 season.

== NFL career statistics ==
=== Regular season ===
Season	Team	Games		Tackles				
Season	Team	GP	GS	Total	Solo	Ast	Sck	Int
2013	SF	3	0	1	1	0	0.0	0
2014	SF	14	6	30	21	9	2.0	0
2015	SF	15	15	59	32	27	2.5	0
2016	SF	14	11	36	24	12	0.0	0
2017	GB	13	2	19	12	7	0.0	0
Total		59	36	145	90	55	4.5	0
