= Adam Pankey =

American football player (born 1994)

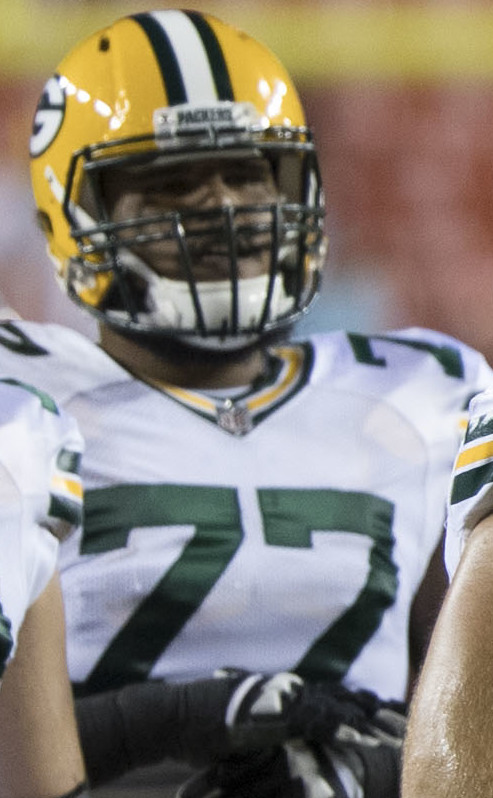
- Pankey with the Green Bay Packers in 2017

Profile
- Position: Offensive tackle

Personal information
- Born: February 2, 1994 (age 32); Hamilton, Ohio, U.S.
- Listed height: 6 ft 5 in (1.96 m)
- Listed weight: 307 lb (139 kg)

Career information
- High school: Hamilton (Hamilton, Ohio)
- College: West Virginia
- NFL draft: 2017: undrafted

Career history
- Green Bay Packers (2017–2018); Tennessee Titans (2019)*; Green Bay Packers (2019); Miami Dolphins (2019–2021); New York Jets (2022–2023); Dallas Cowboys (2023)*
- * Offseason or practice squad member only

Awards and highlights
- Second-team All-Big 12 (2016)

Career NFL statistics
- Games played: 9
- Games started: 1
- Stats at Pro Football Reference

Adam Pankey (born February 2, 1994) is an American professional football offensive tackle. He played college football at West Virginia.

== College career ==
At West Virginia, Pankey was named second-team All-Big 12 at right guard his senior season.

== Professional career ==
Pre-draft measurables
Height	Weight	Arm length	Hand span	40-yard dash	10-yard split	20-yard split	20-yard shuttle	Three-cone drill	Vertical jump	Broad jump
6 ft 4 3/4 in (1.95 m)	307 lb (139 kg)	34 1/2 in (0.88 m)	10 1/8 in (0.26 m)	5.31 s	1.87 s	3.08 s	4.71 s	7.85 s	28.0 in (0.71 m)	9 ft 5 in (2.87 m)
All values from Pro Day

=== Green Bay Packers (first stint) ===
Pankey signed with the Green Bay Packers as an undrafted free agent on May 5, 2017. He was waived by the Packers on September 2, 2017 and was signed to the practice squad the next day. He was promoted to the active roster on September 13, 2017.

Pankey was re-signed on March 13, 2018. He was waived on September 1, 2018 and was signed to the practice squad the next day. He was promoted to the active roster on December 8, 2018 and saw playing time the next day in a 34–20 victory over the Atlanta Falcons.

On August 31, 2019, Pankey was waived by the Packers.

=== Tennessee Titans ===
On September 2, 2019, Pankey was signed to the Tennessee Titans practice squad.

=== Green Bay Packers (second stint) ===
On September 21, 2019, Pankey was signed by the Packers off the Titans practice squad. He was waived on December 9, 2019.

=== Miami Dolphins ===
On December 10, 2019, Pankey was claimed off waivers by the Miami Dolphins.

On March 17, 2021, Pankey re-signed with the Dolphins. He was waived on August 31, 2021 and re-signed to the practice squad the next day. He signed a reserve/future contract with the Dolphins on January 11, 2022. He was released on August 29, 2022.

=== New York Jets ===
On September 21, 2022, Pankey was signed to the New York Jets practice squad. He was promoted to the active roster on January 7, 2023.

On August 29, 2023, Pankey was released by the Jets and re-signed to the practice squad. He was released on October 5.

=== Dallas Cowboys ===
On October 24, 2023, Pankey was signed to the Dallas Cowboys' practice squad. He was released on January 4, 2024.
