= Aaron Peck (American football) =

American gridiron football player (born 1994)

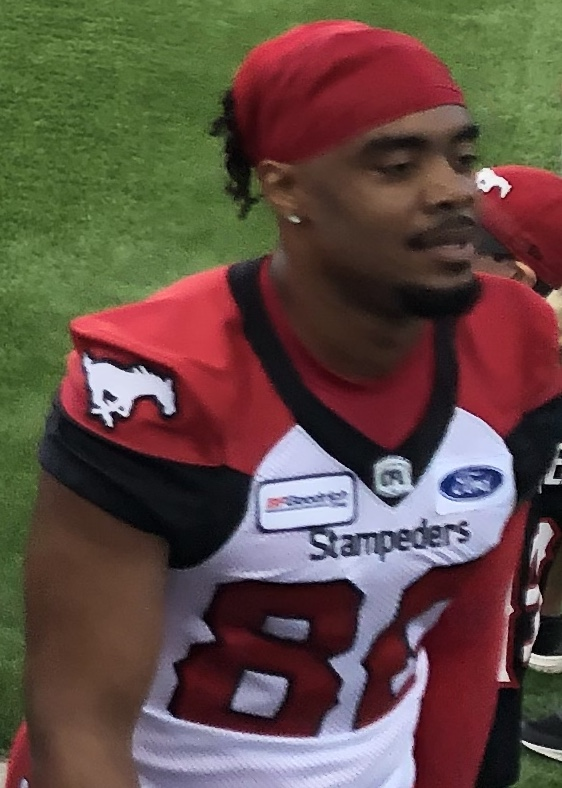

No. 80
- Position: Wide receiver

Personal information
- Born: October 9, 1994 (age 32); Riverside, California
- Listed height: 6 ft 3 in (1.91 m)
- Listed weight: 241 lb (109 kg)

Career information
- High school: Riverside (CA) North
- College: Fresno State
- NFL draft: 2017: undrafted

Career history
- Green Bay Packers (2017)*; San Diego Fleet (2019)*; Calgary Stampeders (2019–2020)
- * Offseason or practice squad member only
- Stats at CFL.ca

Aaron Peck (born October 9, 1994) is an American former football wide receiver. He played college football at Fresno State as a wide receiver before transitioning to the tight end position. He signed with the Green Bay Packers as an undrafted free agent.

== Professional career ==
=== Green Bay Packers ===
After going undrafted in the 2017 NFL draft, Peck signed with the Green Bay Packers as an undrafted free agent on May 5, 2017. He was waived on September 2, 2017.

=== San Diego Fleet ===
On August 6, 2018, Peck signed with the San Diego Fleet of the Alliance of American Football. He failed to make the final roster.

=== Calgary Stampeders ===
Peck re-signed with the Calgary Stampeders on December 17, 2020. He retired from football on June 28, 2021.

== Post-football life ==
=== LAFD ===
In 2023, Peck became a firefighter with the Los Angeles Fire Department (LAFD). As of June 2023, Peck was a member of C shift at Station 21 in South Central LA.
