= Derrick Mathews =

American football player (born 1992)

No. 49
- Position: Linebacker

Personal information
- Born: September 25, 1992 (age 34); Houston, Texas
- Listed height: 6 ft 0 in (1.83 m)
- Listed weight: 232 lb (105 kg)

Career information
- High school: Houston (TX) North Shore
- College: Houston
- NFL draft: 2015: undrafted

Career history
- Washington Redskins (2015–2016)*; Green Bay Packers (2016–2017)*; New York Giants (2017)
- * Offseason or practice squad member only
- Stats at Pro Football Reference

Derrick Mathews (born September 25, 1992) is an American football linebacker who is currently a free agent. He played college football at Houston.

== College career ==
Mathews played four years at Houston, finishing fifth in the school's history with 400 career tackles with 15 double-digit tackle games. He was a team captain his senior year, starting six games before suffering a torn ACL.

== Professional career ==
=== Washington Redskins ===
On November 23, 2015, Mathews was signed to the Washington Redskins' practice squad. He was released by the Redskins on January 5, 2016, but signed a reserve/future contract with the team a week later. He was waived by the Redskins on May 2, 2016.

=== Green Bay Packers ===
On August 2, 2016, Mathews signed with the Green Bay Packers. He was waived on August 29, 2016. He was re-signed to the practice squad on November 23, 2016. He signed a reserve/future contract with the Packers on January 24, 2017.

On September 2, 2017, Mathews was waived by the Packers and was signed to the practice squad the next day. He was released on November 11, 2017, but was re-signed two days later. He was released on November 28, 2017.

=== New York Giants ===
On December 6, 2017, Mathews was signed to the New York Giants' practice squad. He was promoted to the active roster on December 26, 2017.

On May 15, 2018, Mathews was waived by the Giants.
