= Justin McCray =

American football player (born 1992)

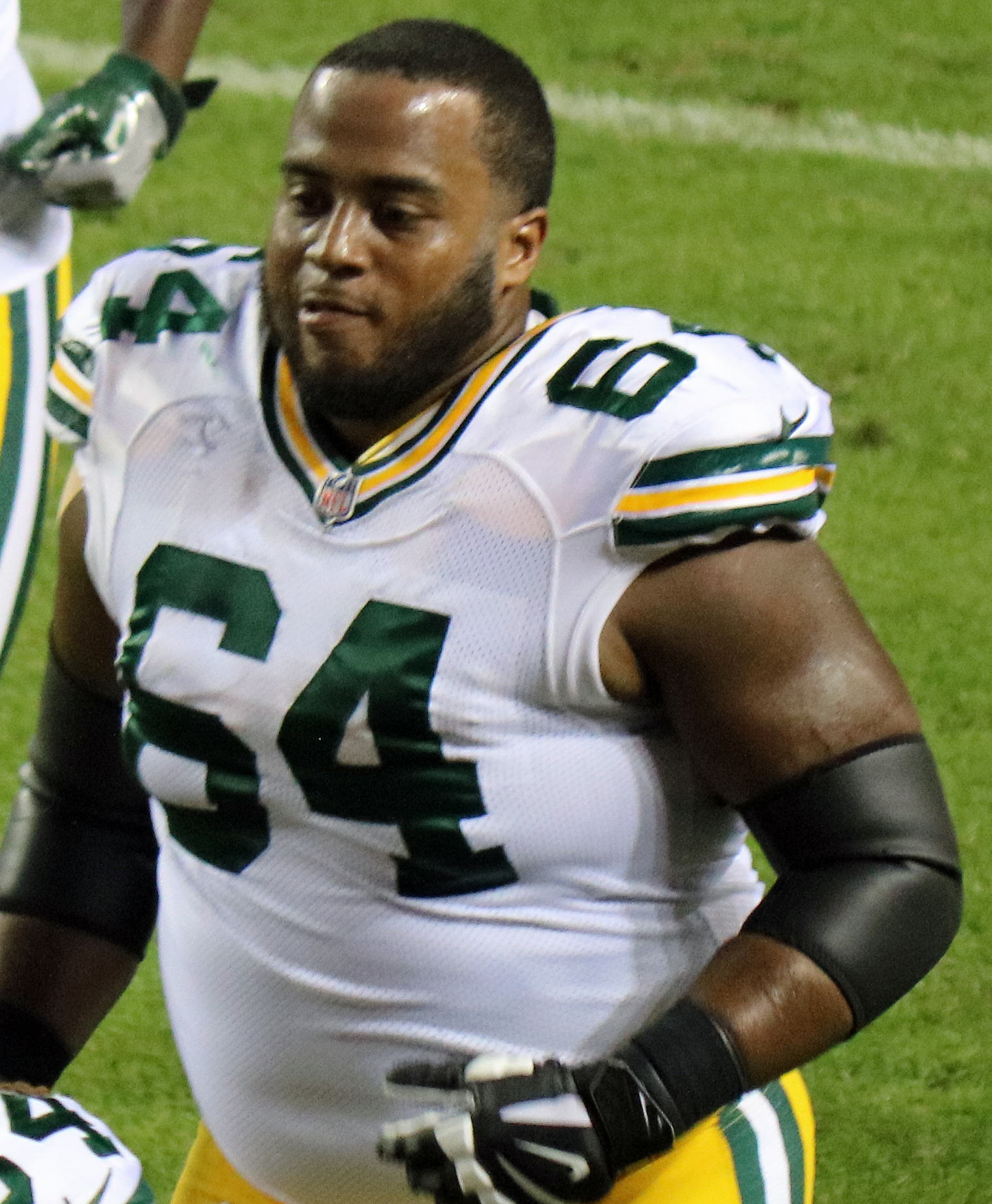
- McCray with the Green Bay Packers in 2017

Profile
- Position: Guard

Personal information
- Born: May 31, 1992 (age 34); Miami, Florida, U.S.
- Listed height: 6 ft 3 in (1.91 m)
- Listed weight: 320 lb (145 kg)

Career information
- High school: Miami Southridge (South Miami Heights, Florida)
- College: UCF (2010–2013)
- NFL draft: 2014: undrafted

Career history
- Tennessee Titans (2014–2015)*; Orlando Predators (2016); Tampa Bay Storm (2017)*; Green Bay Packers (2017–2018); Cleveland Browns (2019); Atlanta Falcons (2020); Houston Texans (2021–2022); Carolina Panthers (2023)
- * Offseason or practice squad member only

Awards and highlights
- First-team All-AAC (2013)

Career NFL statistics as of 2023
- Games played: 80
- Games started: 31
- Stats at Pro Football Reference
- Stats at ArenaFan.com

Justin Dominique McCray (May 31, 1992) is an American former professional football player who was a guard in the National Football League (NFL). He played college football for the UCF Knights.

== College career ==
McCray attended the University of Central Florida, playing from 2010 to 2013.

== Professional career ==
Pre-draft measurables
Height	Weight	Arm length	Hand span	40-yard dash	10-yard split	20-yard split	20-yard shuttle	Three-cone drill	Vertical jump	Broad jump	Bench press
6 ft 3 1/8 in (1.91 m)	321 lb (146 kg)	32 in (0.81 m)	9 3/4 in (0.25 m)	5.49 s	1.84 s	3.02 s	4.78 s	7.87 s	25.5 in (0.65 m)	8 ft 3 in (2.51 m)	32 reps
All values from Pro Day

=== Tennessee Titans ===
McCray signed with the Tennessee Titans as an undrafted free agent on May 12, 2014. He was waived on August 30, 2014, and was signed to the practice squad the next day. After spending his entire rookie season on the practice squad, he signed a futures contract with the Titans on December 29, 2014.

On August 30, 2015, McCray was waived by the Titans.

=== Arena Football League ===
McCray then joined the Arena Football League with the Orlando Predators, where McCray played with his brother Jordan. On October 14, 2016, McCray was assigned to the Tampa Bay Storm during the dispersal draft.

=== Green Bay Packers ===
On March 29, 2017, McCray signed with the Green Bay Packers. After making the Packers 53-man roster, McCray earned his first career start in Week 2 at right tackle in place of an injured Bryan Bulaga. He then made his eighth start in the last game of the season on December 31, 2017.

He was re-signed on March 12, 2018.

=== Cleveland Browns ===
On August 31, 2019, McCray was traded to the Cleveland Browns.

=== Atlanta Falcons ===
On March 27, 2020, McCray signed a one-year contract with the Atlanta Falcons.

=== Houston Texans ===
McCray signed a two-year contract with the Houston Texans on March 22, 2021.

=== Carolina Panthers ===
On March 17, 2023, McCray signed with the Carolina Panthers. On August 29, 2023, he was waived for final roster cuts, but signed to the Panthers' practice squad the following day. He was released on October 24. He was re-signed on November 22. McCray was signed to the active roster on December 5. He suffered a calf injury in Week 14 and was placed on injured reserve on December 15.
