= Kyle Murphy (American football, born 1993) =

American football player (born 1993)

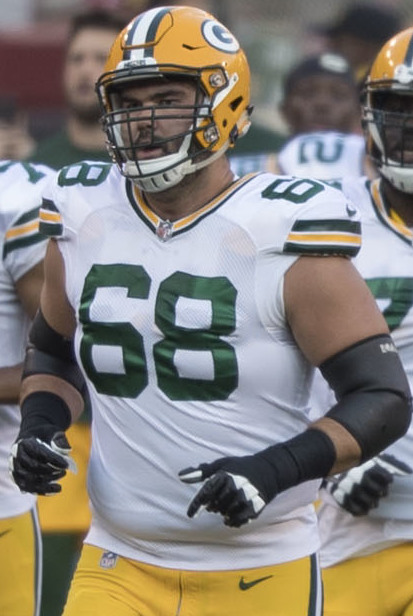
- Murphy with the Green Bay Packers in 2017

No. 68, 79
- Position: Offensive tackle

Personal information
- Born: December 11, 1993 (age 32); Mission Viejo, California, U.S.
- Listed height: 6 ft 6 in (1.98 m)
- Listed weight: 305 lb (138 kg)

Career information
- High school: San Clemente (San Clemente, California)
- College: Stanford
- NFL draft: 2016: 6th round, 200th overall pick

Career history
- Green Bay Packers (2016–2018); Los Angeles Rams (2018–2019)*; Houston Texans (2019–2020)*; New Orleans Saints (2021); DC Defenders (2023)
- * Offseason or practice squad member only

Awards and highlights
- First-team All-Pac-12 (2015); Second-team All-Pac-12 (2014)

Career NFL statistics
- Games played: 7
- Games started: 3
- Stats at Pro Football Reference

Kyle Neil Murphy (born December 11, 1993) is an American former professional football player who was an offensive tackle in the National Football League (NFL). He played college football for the Stanford Cardinal on a scholarship. At Stanford, he was a four-year starter and named to multiple first-team and second-team All-Pac-12 Conference teams. He was selected by the Green Bay Packers in the sixth round of the 2016 NFL draft.

== Early life ==
Murphy was born in Mission Viejo, California, and attended San Clemente High School. While attending high school he lettered in not only football, but track and field where he was a shot put champion. While in high School he played in the 2012 U.S. Army All-American Bowl and was also awarded the U.S. Army's Glenn Davis Award, awarded to those who represent the Army's "high standard of excellence in community service, education, and athletic distinction." He was named to two All-Orange County teams and as a senior was named the South Coast Conference MVP.

Murphy was ranked as a five star offensive tackle prospect by Rivals.com and a four star prospect by ESPN.com, ranked 27th overall in the country in the ESPN top 150. As such, he was highly recruited coming out of high school. He received scholarship offers from a large amount of Division I schools including Stanford, Alabama, Arizona, Arizona State, Auburn, and California. He accepted visits from Stanford, Oregon, Florida, and USC.

== College career ==
Murphy ultimately decided to play for the Stanford Cardinal. In his first year, he was one of three freshman lineman to play, starting in two games and playing in 14. He wore two jersey numbers, 78 for when on the line of scrimmage and 94 for when he was an eligible receiver. He averaged 25 snaps per game at tight end and offensive tackle.

In his sophomore year, Murphy played in 13 games as offensive tackle and tight end.

Murphy started all 13 games as right tackle in his junior year, where he was named to the All-Pac-12 Conference second-team, as well as Phil Steele's All-Pac-12 second-team. Stanford's offensive line ranked 18th in the country in tackles for loss allowed and 42nd in sacks.

In his final year with the Cardinal, he started all 14 games at left tackle and was named a team captain. His play earned him a spot on the watchlists for the Lombardi Award and the Outland Trophy. He finished the year by being named as a third-team All-American by Phil Steele, and to a spot on the All-Pac-12 first-team.

== Professional career ==
=== Green Bay Packers ===
Murphy was projected as a fifth or sixth round pick by Lance Zierlein of NFL.com. He stated that he had a good feel for his position and was aware in pass protection. He also mentioned that he had good pad level against the running back and did a good job of securing blocks. However, he also said that he had average quickness and that speed rushers gave him an issue. Additionally, there was concern that he was "antsy" before the snap and that game tape showed him starting early. Even though it was not called by college officials, this would create false start penalties at the professional level.

Murphy was selected in the sixth round with the 200th overall selection by the Green Bay Packers. Green Bay had drafted his long time teammate Blake Martinez earlier in the draft in the fourth round. Blake later commented that after Murphy was drafted that he and his family "were going crazy at my house. It was awesome." Murphy later commented that getting a call from the Packers was "extraordinary." Murphy also noted that he was ready to play wherever the team asked him. On May 6, 2016, he signed a contract with the Packers.

Murphy made his first career start in the 2017 season opener against the Seattle Seahawks at right tackle in place of the injured Bryan Bulaga, and the next two weeks at left tackle in place of the injured David Bakhtiari. On September 26, 2017, Murphy was placed on injured reserve after suffering a foot injury.

On September 1, 2018, Murphy was placed on injured reserve. He was released on December 27, 2018.

=== Los Angeles Rams ===
On December 29, 2018, Murphy was signed to the Los Angeles Rams practice squad. He signed a reserve/future contract with the Rams on February 6, 2019. He was waived on April 16, 2019.

=== Houston Texans ===
On October 16, 2019, Murphy was signed to the Houston Texans practice squad. He signed a reserve/future contract with the Texans on January 13, 2020.

On September 5, 2020, Murphy was released by the Texans.

=== New Orleans Saints ===
On May 16, 2021, Murphy signed with the New Orleans Saints. He was placed on injured reserve on August 17, 2021, and released with an injury settlement on August 25. He was re-signed to the practice squad on December 27, but released the next day.

=== DC Defenders ===
On January 22, 2023, Murphy signed with the DC Defenders of the XFL. He retired after the 2023 season.

== Personal life ==
Murphy is the younger brother of former Minnesota Vikings offensive tackle Kevin Murphy.
