= Micah Hyde (American football) =

American football player (born 1990)

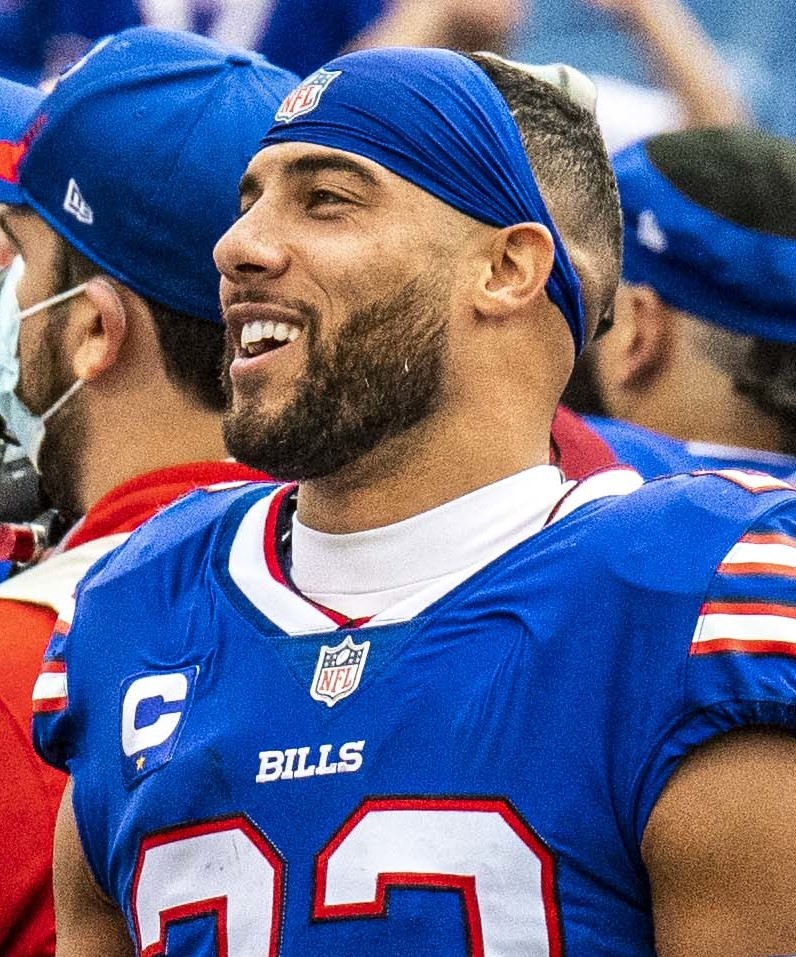
- Hyde with the Buffalo Bills in 2021

No. 33, 23
- Position: Safety

Personal information
- Born: December 31, 1990 (age 35); Fostoria, Ohio, U.S.
- Listed height: 6 ft 0 in (1.83 m)
- Listed weight: 197 lb (89 kg)

Career information
- High school: Fostoria
- College: Iowa (2009–2012)
- NFL draft: 2013: 5th round, 159th overall pick

Career history
- Green Bay Packers (2013–2016); Buffalo Bills (2017–2024)

Awards and highlights
- 2× Second-team All-Pro (2017, 2021); Pro Bowl (2017); Big Ten Defensive Back of the Year (2012); First-team All-Big Ten (2012); Second-team All-Big Ten (2011)

Career NFL statistics
- Total tackles: 644
- Sacks: 5.0
- Pass deflections: 66
- Interceptions: 24
- Forced fumbles: 5
- Fumble recoveries: 8
- Return yards: 1,748
- Total touchdowns: 5
- Stats at Pro Football Reference

Micah Richmond Hyde (born December 31, 1990) is an American former professional football safety who played in National Football League (NFL) for 11 seasons. He played college football for the Iowa Hawkeyes, and was selected by the Green Bay Packers in the fifth round of the 2013 NFL draft. After four years in Green Bay, Hyde signed with the Buffalo Bills, where he would form one half of an effective safety tandem with Jordan Poyer. Hyde received All-Pro and Pro Bowl honors for his play in Buffalo.

== Early life ==
Hyde was born in Fostoria, Ohio, and attended Fostoria High School where he lettered in three sports: baseball, basketball and football. On the gridiron, he was a team captain during his sophomore, junior, and senior seasons with the team. As a junior, Hyde earned northern Ohio first-team honors as a quarterback, cornerback, and kicker. He was also named honorable mention as a punter. He was additionally named a first-team defensive back and quarterback in his senior year. He also earned first-team all-conference basketball and baseball honors and averaged 22 points a game in basketball during his time there. During his career, he had 165 tackles, eight interceptions and seven defended passes as a cornerback. As a quarterback, he had 549 rushing attempts for 3,443 yards and 46 touchdowns and also completed 606 out of 997 passes for 7,864 yards and 65 touchdowns. Hyde broke 17 school records, including those for touchdown passes in a season and a career.

== College career ==
Hyde was heavily recruited coming out of high school and received scholarship offers from numerous schools including Iowa, Ball State, Bowling Green, Miami (OH), Ohio, and Toledo. He was ranked as a two-star dual-threat quarterback by Rivals.com He ran the 40-yard dash in 4.45 seconds, had a 3.2 GPA at Fostoria and scored a 20 on his ACT.

Hyde ultimately decided to play for the Iowa Hawkeyes and competed mainly on special teams and on a defense that had 11 players who would go on to be drafted into the NFL. He received his first college playing time in a game against Northern Iowa and contributed one tackle on special teams. He also appeared against the Michigan Wolverines and recorded two tackles.

During his sophomore year, Hyde played a much more expanded role on defense and started all 13 games at cornerback. He made his first big impact in a game against the Ball State Cardinals, where he forced a fumble and intercepted a pass. Later in the season when the Hawkeyes played Michigan State, Hyde scored his first touchdown on a lateral from teammate Tyler Sash late in the first quarter. He finished the season with a career-high in tackles with 82, 58 of them solo, with 4 interceptions. His performance led to him being named as an honorable mention to the All-Big Ten team.

After the successes of his second year, Hyde was rotated between free safety and cornerback during spring practice and started the first two games at safety. He was moved back to cornerback against Pittsburgh and had two interceptions, the second winning the game for the Hawkeyes as it allowed them to run the clock out. He finished the year with 72 tackles (1.5 for loss), 3 interceptions, and a forced fumble. He was named an honorable mention to the All-Big Ten team.

In his final year with the Hawkeyes, Hyde was named a first-team All-Big Ten selection and also won the Tatum-Woodson Award, annually given to the best defensive back in the conference. He finished his career starting every game for three consecutive seasons. He finished his senior year with 78 tackles, 14 defensed passes, an interception, three forced fumbles and two fumble recoveries.

== Professional career ==
=== Pre-draft ===
Hyde was one of 60 defensive backs to attend the NFL Scouting Combine in Indianapolis, Indiana, and performed all of the combine drills. On March 25, 2013, Hyde attended Iowa's Pro Day and ran positional drills. He attempted to perform better in multiple combine drills, but was only able to lower his time in the three-cone drill (6.67s). He was projected to be a sixth round pick by NFL draft experts and scouts. He was also ranked the 25th best cornerback prospect in the draft by DraftScout.com.

External videos
- Micah Hyde's NFL Combine Workout

Pre-draft measurables
Height	Weight	Arm length	Hand span	40-yard dash	10-yard split	20-yard split	20-yard shuttle	Three-cone drill	Vertical jump	Broad jump	Bench press	Wonderlic
5 ft 11 3/4 in (1.82 m)	197 lb (89 kg)	31 1/2 in (0.80 m)	9 3/8 in (0.24 m)	4.56 s	1.65 s	2.70 s	4.20 s	6.78 s	33 in (0.84 m)	10 ft 1 in (3.07 m)	12 reps	21
All results from NFL Combine

=== Green Bay Packers ===
The Green Bay Packers selected Hyde in the fifth round (159th overall) of the 2013 NFL draft. He was the 23rd cornerback selected in 2013. It was speculated by draft analysts and media members that his fall from the fifth round was in part due to his past arrest (see Personal life).

External videos
- Packers select Hyde 159th overall

==== 2013 ====
On May 10, 2013, the Green Bay Packers signed Hyde to a four–year, $2.33 million contract that includes a signing bonus of $178,108.

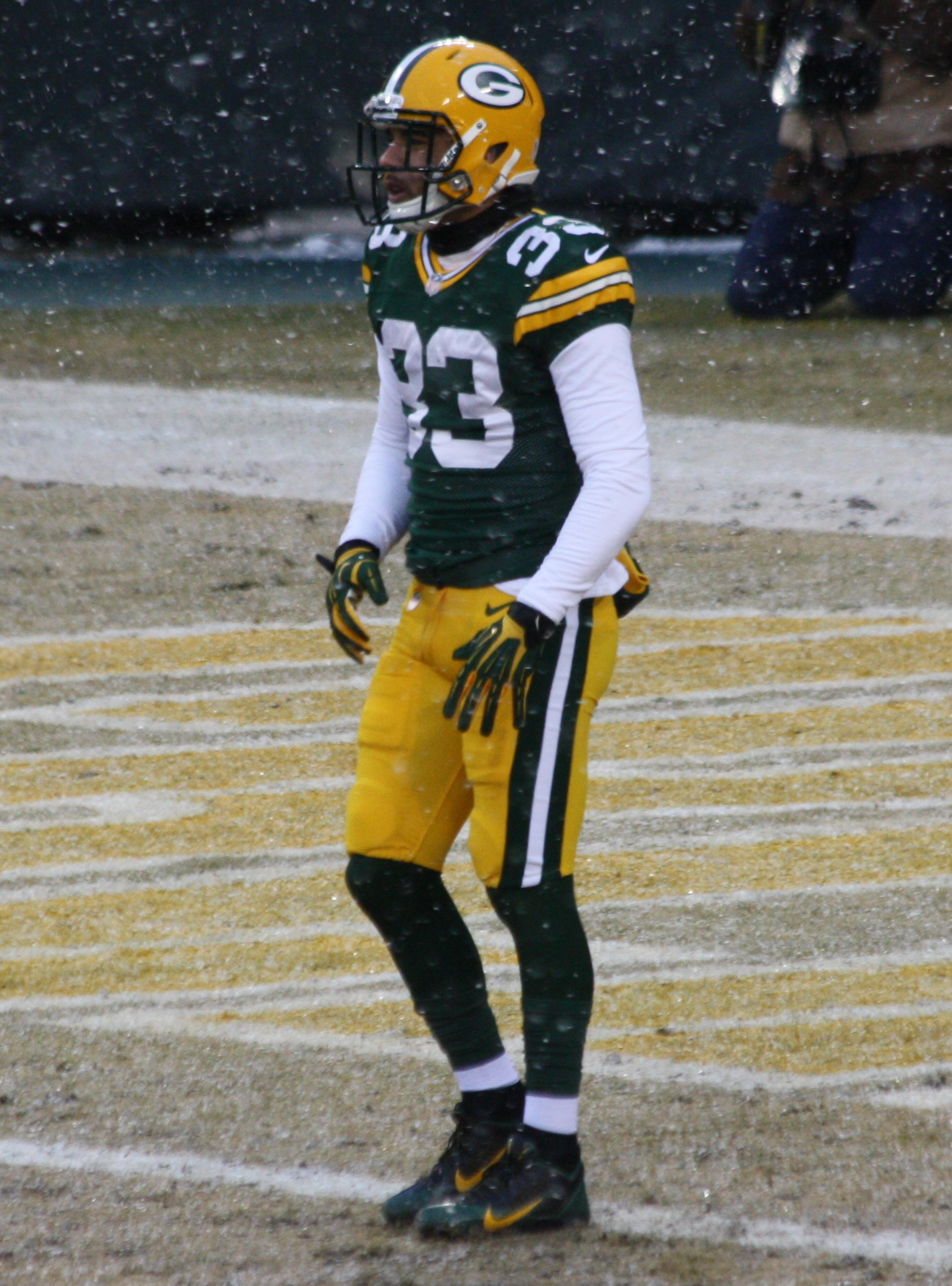
Hyde preparing for kickoff in 2013

Throughout training camp, Hyde competed to be a backup cornerback against Casey Hayward, Davon House, Jarrett Bush, and James Nixon. Head coach Mike McCarthy named Hyde a backup to start the season and listed him as the fifth cornerback on the depth chart, behind Sam Shields, Tramon Williams, Casey Hayward, and Davon House. He was also selected to be a backup punt and kick returner by special teams coordinator Shawn Slocum.

He made his professional regular season debut in the Packers' season opener at the San Francisco 49ers and recorded four combined tackles during their 34–28 loss. Hyde recorded his first career tackle on wide receiver Anquan Boldin after a nine-yard reception in the first quarter. Hyde was promoted to first-team nickelback after Casey Hayward aggravated a hamstring injury during their third preseason game and was sidelined for the first seven regular season games. In Week 5, Hyde returned the first punt of his career for a two-yard gain before being tackled by Don Carey in the third quarter of the Packers' 22–9 win against the Detroit Lions. On October 13, 2013, Hyde recorded a season-high seven combined tackles and made his first career sack on quarterback Joe Flacco during a 19–17 victory at the Baltimore Ravens in Week 6. On October 27, 2013, he made six combined tackles and returned a punt for a 93-yard touchdown during a 44–31 victory at the Minnesota Vikings. His touchdown marked the first score of his career and occurred in the second quarter off a 53-yard punt by Jeff Locke. On December 22, 2013, Hyde earned his first career start and recorded six combined tackles during a 38–31 loss to the Pittsburgh Steelers in Week 16. He also returned five kicks for 167 yards during their matchup against the Steelers. Hyde finished his rookie season with 55 combined tackles (41 solo), two pass deflections, and a sack in 16 games and three starts. As a returner, he finished the season with 22 kick returns (24.14 YPR) for 531 yards and 24 punt returns for 296 yards (12.33 YPR) and a touchdown.

The Green Bay Packers finished the season atop the NFC North with an 8–7–1 record. On January 5, 2014, Hyde appeared in his first career playoff game and collected five combined tackles and a pass deflection in the Packers' 23–20 loss to the 49ers in the NFC Wildcard Game.

==== 2014 ====
During organized team activities, Hyde began to transition to free safety. Head coach Mike McCarthy opted to change his position due to the Packers lack of depth at safety after the departure of M. D. Jennings to the Chicago Bears in free agency. Throughout training camp, Hyde competed against rookie first round pick Ha Ha Clinton-Dix for the job as the starting free safety. Defensive coordinator Dom Capers named Hyde the starting free safety to start the regular season, opposite strong safety Morgan Burnett. He also remained the backup kick and punt returner for the season.

He started the Packers' season-opener at the Seattle Seahawks and made five combined tackles in their 36–16 loss. On October 26, 2014, Hyde recorded a season-high seven combined tackles during a 44–23 loss at the New Orleans Saints in Week 8. In Week 10, Hyde made a season-high two pass deflections, a tackle, and his first career interception in the Packers' 55–14 victory against the Bears. His interception occurred in the first quarter off a pass by quarterback Jay Cutler and was originally intended for tight end Martellus Bennett. On November 16, 2014, Hyde collected four solo tackles, broke up a pass, and returned a punt by Donnie Jones for a 75-yard touchdown during a 53–20 victory against the Philadelphia Eagles. On November 23, 2014, he made four solo tackles, a pass deflection, a sack, and intercepted a pass by Teddy Bridgewater during a 24–21 win at the Vikings. He finished the season with 59 combined tackles (45 solo), seven pass deflections, two interceptions, and a sack in 16 games and 12 starts. Hyde also had 14 punt returns for 221 yards and two touchdowns in 2014.

The Packers finished first in their division with a 12–4 record and went on to defeat the Dallas Cowboys in the NFC Divisional Round. On January 18, 2015, Hyde made his first start in a playoff game and made a tackle during a 28–22 loss at the Seahawks in the NFC Championship Game.

==== 2015 ====
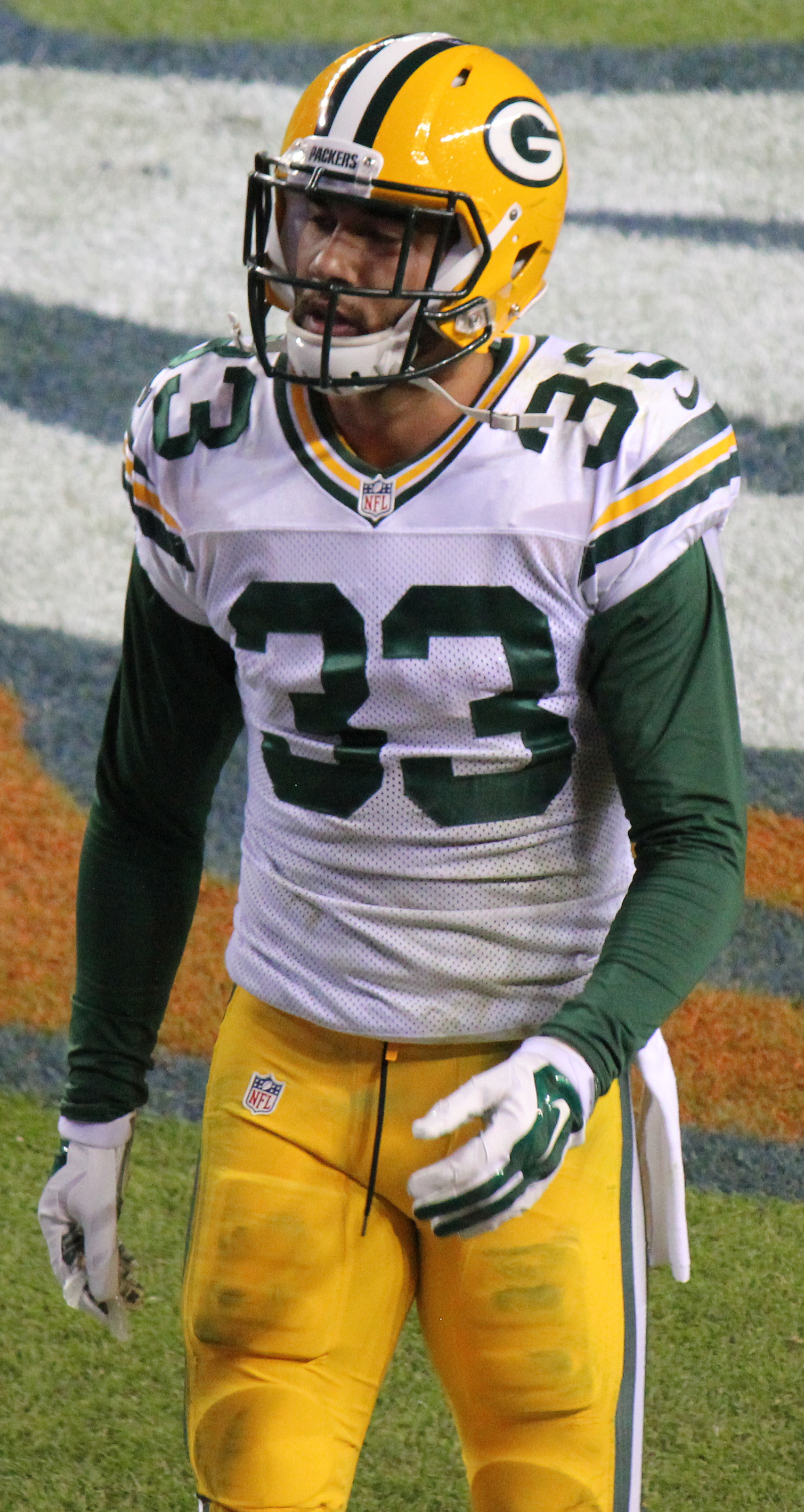
Hyde with the Green Bay Packers in 2015

During training camp, Hyde competed against Casey Hayward to be the Packers' starting nickelback. He was named the backup free safety, behind Ha Ha Clinton-Dix, and the starting nickelback to begin the regular season.

He started at strong safety in the season-opener and for four other games (Weeks 3–6) after Morgan Burnett sustained a calf injury. On October 18, 2015, Hyde recorded a season-high nine combined tackles and a pass deflection during a 27–20 victory against the San Diego Chargers. Hyde was inactive for the Packers' Week 12 loss to the Bears due to a hip injury. He finished the 2015 season with 55 combined tackles (51 solo), six pass deflections, three interceptions, and a sack in 15 games and seven starts. Hyde also returned eight kicks for 187 yards and 27 punts for 157 yards.

The Packers finished second in the NFC North with a 10–6 record. On January 10, 2016, Hyde made eight combined tackles and a pass deflection in the Packers' 35–18 victory at the Washington Redskins in the NFC Wildcard Game. The Packers were eliminated from the playoffs after losing 26–20 at the Arizona Cardinals in the NFC Divisional Round the following week.

==== 2016 ====
Head coach Mike McCarthy named Hyde the No. 1 nickelback and backup strong safety, behind Morgan Burnett, to start the 2016 regular season.

In Week 3, he started at strong safety after Morgan Burnett was declared inactive due to a groin injury. In his place, Hyde recorded a season-high 11 combined tackles (eight solo) during a 34–27 win over the Lions. On December 18, 2016, Hyde recorded a season-high three pass deflections, three solo tackles, and intercepted a pass by Jay Cutler in the Packers' 30–27 victory at the Bears. He finished the 2016 season with 58 combined tackles (47 solo), nine pass deflections, three interceptions, and a sack in 16 games and 11 starts. He received an overall grade of 73.9 from Pro Football Focus and ranked 53rd among qualified safeties.

The Packers finished atop the NFC North with a 10–6 record. On January 8, 2017, Hyde made seven combined tackles and a pass deflection during a 36–13 victory against the New York Giants in the NFC Wildcard Game. The following week, he recorded four solo tackles, two pass deflections, and intercepted a pass by Dak Prescott during a 34–31 victory against the Cowboys in the NFC Divisional Round. The Green Bay Packers were eliminated after losing 44–21 to the Atlanta Falcons in the NFC Championship Game.

After the 2016 season, Hyde became an unrestricted free agent. Packers' general manager Ted Thompson neglected to make Hyde a contract offer and later apologized for not being able to work out a deal. He was named as one of the most overlooked free agents on the market and was named one of the top sleeper free agents. It was reported by NFL analyst Ian Rapoport that Hyde had received two strong offers.

=== Buffalo Bills ===
On March 9, 2017, the Buffalo Bills signed Hyde to a five-year, $30.50 million contract that includes $14 million guaranteed and a signing bonus of $8 million.

==== 2017 ====
Head coach Sean McDermott named Hyde the starting free safety to begin the regular season, along with strong safety Jordan Poyer.

He made his Bills regular season debut in their season-opener against the New York Jets and recorded three solo tackles, broke up a pass, and intercepted a pass by Josh McCown in the 21–12 victory. On October 1, 2017, Hyde made seven combined tackles, two pass deflections, and intercepted two passes by Matt Ryan during a 23–17 win at the Falcons. It marked Hyde's first time intercepting multiple passes in a single game. In Week 8, he recorded five solo tackles, a pass deflection, and intercepted a pass by Derek Carr in the Bills' 34–14 win against the Oakland Raiders. On November 2, 2017, Hyde was named the AFC Defensive Player of the Month for October after making four interceptions in the last four games. On December 3, 2017, he collected a career-high 12 combined tackles (ten solo) and a pass deflection during a 23–3 loss to the New England Patriots in Week 13. On December 19, 2017, it was announced that Hyde was voted to the 2018 Pro Bowl, marking the first time he received the honor. He finished his first season with the Bills with 82 combined tackles (65 solo), 13 pass deflections, and five interceptions in 16 games and 16 starts. He set new career-highs in all four statistical categories. Pro Football Focus gave Hyde an overall grade of 86.2, ranking 14th among all qualified safeties in 2017. Hyde and Poyer were one of the highest graded safety duos in 2017 and were considered as possibly the best tandem in the league by many NFL analysts and media members. He was ranked 62nd by his peers on the NFL Top 100 Players of 2018.

The Bills finished second in the AFC East with a 9–7 record and received a wildcard berth. On January 7, 2018, Hyde recorded four solo tackles before exiting the Bills' 10–3 loss at the Jacksonville Jaguars in the fourth quarter after sustaining a concussion.

==== 2018 ====
Hyde started 15 games at safety in 2018, missing one game due to a groin injury. He finished the season with 2 interceptions, 58 combined tackles, 5 passes defensed and a fumble recovery. He also saw significant time as a punt returner. Despite his statistically quiet season, the Bills finished with the league's second-ranked pass defense.

==== 2019 ====
In week 4 against the Patriots, Hyde intercepted Tom Brady in the end zone. Other notable plays in Hyde's 2019 season included returning an onside kick for a touchdown to clinch a 31–21 Bills win over the Miami Dolphins in week 7, and a fumble recovery in the week 16 rematch against the Patriots.

==== 2020 ====
In Week 13 against the 49ers on Monday Night Football, Hyde recorded a team high 12 tackles and his first interception of the season off a pass thrown by Nick Mullens during the 34–24 win.

In the Wild Card Round of the playoffs against the Indianapolis Colts, Hyde broke up a pass thrown by Philip Rivers on fourth down late in the fourth quarter to secure a 27–24 win for the Bills.

==== 2021 ====
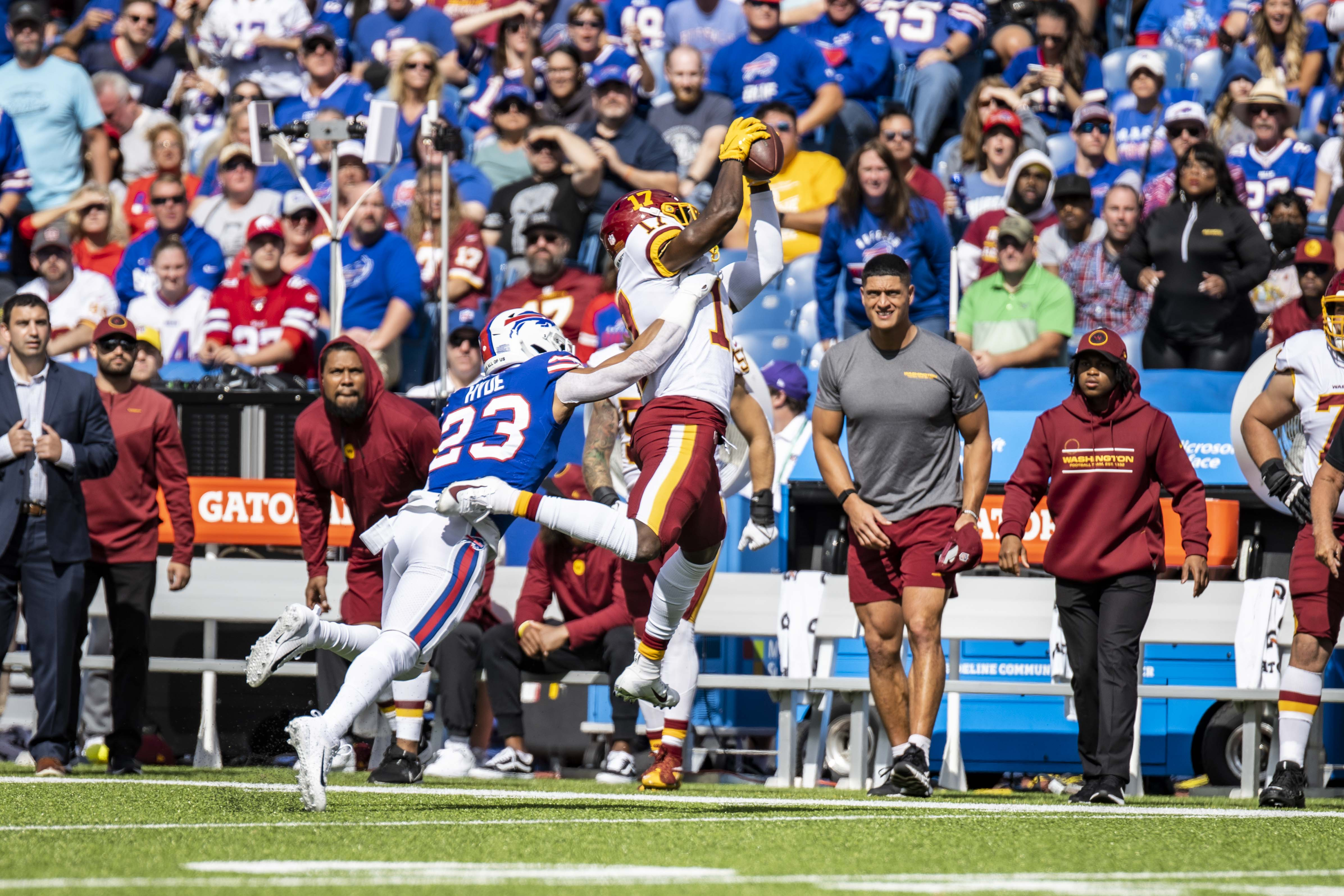
Hyde playing against the Washington Football Team in 2021.

Prior to the 2021 season, Hyde signed a two-year, $19.25 million contract extension with the Bills on March 5, 2021, keeping him under contract through 2023. For the season, Hyde tied his career high for interceptions, fumble recoveries, and scored his first career defensive touchdown in Week 5 after intercepting Kansas City Chiefs quarterback Patrick Mahomes. They faced the Chiefs again in the AFC Divisional Round where they lost 42–36 in overtime. Hyde was named a second-team All-Pro at safety for the second time in his career.

==== 2022 ====
Hyde suffered a neck injury in Week 2 and was placed on injured reserve on September 24, 2022.

==== 2023 ====
Hyde returned from injury in 2023, regaining his starting spot at free safety. Playing against the Washington Commanders in Week 3, he intercepted quarterback Sam Howell, one of four interceptions by the Bills during the 37–3 win. Hyde finished the season with 54 tackles, 7 pass deflections, and two interceptions, though he missed a few games due to several "stingers". He became a free agent following the season, stating he was undecided on whether to retire or to return but that he would not play for another team aside from the Bills.

==== 2024 ====
On December 4, 2024, Hyde rejoined the Bills as a member of their practice squad.

On January 27, 2025, Hyde officially announced his retirement from the NFL after playing 11 seasons.

== NFL career statistics ==
=== Regular season ===
Year	Team	Games		Tackles				Interceptions						Fumbles			
Year	Team	GP	GS	Cmb	Solo	Ast	Sck	PD	Int	Yds	Avg	Lng	TD	FF	FR	Yds	TD
2013	GB	16	3	55	41	14	1.0	2	0	0	0.0	0	0	2	1	0	0
2014	GB	16	12	59	45	14	1.0	7	2	9	4.5	9	0	0	0	0	0
2015	GB	15	7	55	51	4	1.0	6	3	36	12.0	34	0	0	2	0	0
2016	GB	16	11	58	47	11	1.0	9	3	11	3.7	11	0	0	2	0	0
2017	BUF	16	16	82	65	17	0.0	13	5	64	12.8	37	0	0	0	0	0
2018	BUF	15	15	58	41	17	0.0	5	2	16	8.0	16	0	0	1	9	0
2019	BUF	16	16	72	50	22	0.0	2	1	0	0.0	0	0	2	0	0	0
2020	BUF	15	15	70	48	22	0.0	5	1	33	33.0	33	0	0	0	0	0
2021	BUF	17	17	74	53	21	1.0	10	5	59	11.8	26	1	1	2	16	0
2022	BUF	2	2	7	4	3	0.0	0	0	0	0.0	0	0	0	0	0	0
2023	BUF	14	14	54	37	17	0.0	7	2	24	12.0	23	0	0	0	0	0
Total		158	128	644	482	162	5.0	66	24	252	10.5	37	1	5	8	25	0
Source: pro-football-reference.com

=== Postseason ===
Year	Team	Games		Tackles				Interceptions						Fumbles			
Year	Team	GP	GS	Cmb	Solo	Ast	Sck	PD	Int	Yds	Avg	Lng	TD	FF	FR	Yds	TD
2013	GB	1	0	5	4	1	0.0	1	0	0	0.0	0	0	1	0	0	0
2014	GB	2	1	2	2	0	0.0	0	0	0	0.0	0	0	0	1	0	0
2015	GB	2	0	8	2	6	0.0	1	0	0	0.0	0	0	0	0	0	0
2016	GB	3	3	14	12	2	1.0	3	1	18	18.0	18	0	0	0	0	0
2017	BUF	1	1	4	4	0	0.0	0	0	0	0.0	0	0	0	0	0	0
2019	BUF	1	1	5	4	1	0.0	0	0	0	0.0	0	0	0	0	0	0
2020	BUF	3	3	17	14	3	0.0	3	0	0	0.0	0	0	0	0	0	0
2021	BUF	2	2	6	4	2	0.0	1	1	0	0.0	0	0	0	0	0	0
2023	BUF	2	2	7	7	0	0.0	0	0	0	0.0	0	0	0	0	0	0
Total		17	13	69	54	15	1.0	9	2	18	9.0	18	0	1	1	0	0
Source: pro-football-reference.com

== Personal life ==
Hyde has an older brother named Marcus who played safety for Michigan State's football team from 2006 to 2010.

On October 5, 2012, Hyde was arrested for public intoxication and interference with official acts by the Iowa City Police Department. It was reported that Hyde and a group of 15 people declined to leave Old Capitol Brew Works after staff asked multiple times around closing. After Iowa City Police arrived, Hyde and a group of friends were pointed out by staff as some of the subjects involved in the disturbance. Police confronted the group, but their commands to stop and flashing lights were ignored by the group and they all fled on foot. Hyde was apprehended two blocks away and police claimed he had bloodshot eyes and multiple signs of impairment. He was arrested and lodged in Johnson County Jail until he bonded out at 11 am. He appeared in court two days later and pled guilty to interfering with an official and paid a $397.50 fine. He pled not guilty to the charge of public intoxication and was given a new court date.

On December 9, 2012, Hyde was charged with disorderly conduct after Iowa City Police arrived at his apartment building due to complaints of a loud party on the top floor of the building. He was not arrested, but was cited for misdemeanor disorderly conduct and given a court date.

On July 7, 2018, Micah married Amanda Kamiksisian. The Hydes have a son, Micah, Jr., born March 2020, and a daughter, Maverick Hudson Hyde, born in August 2021.
