= Davon House =

American football player (born 1989)

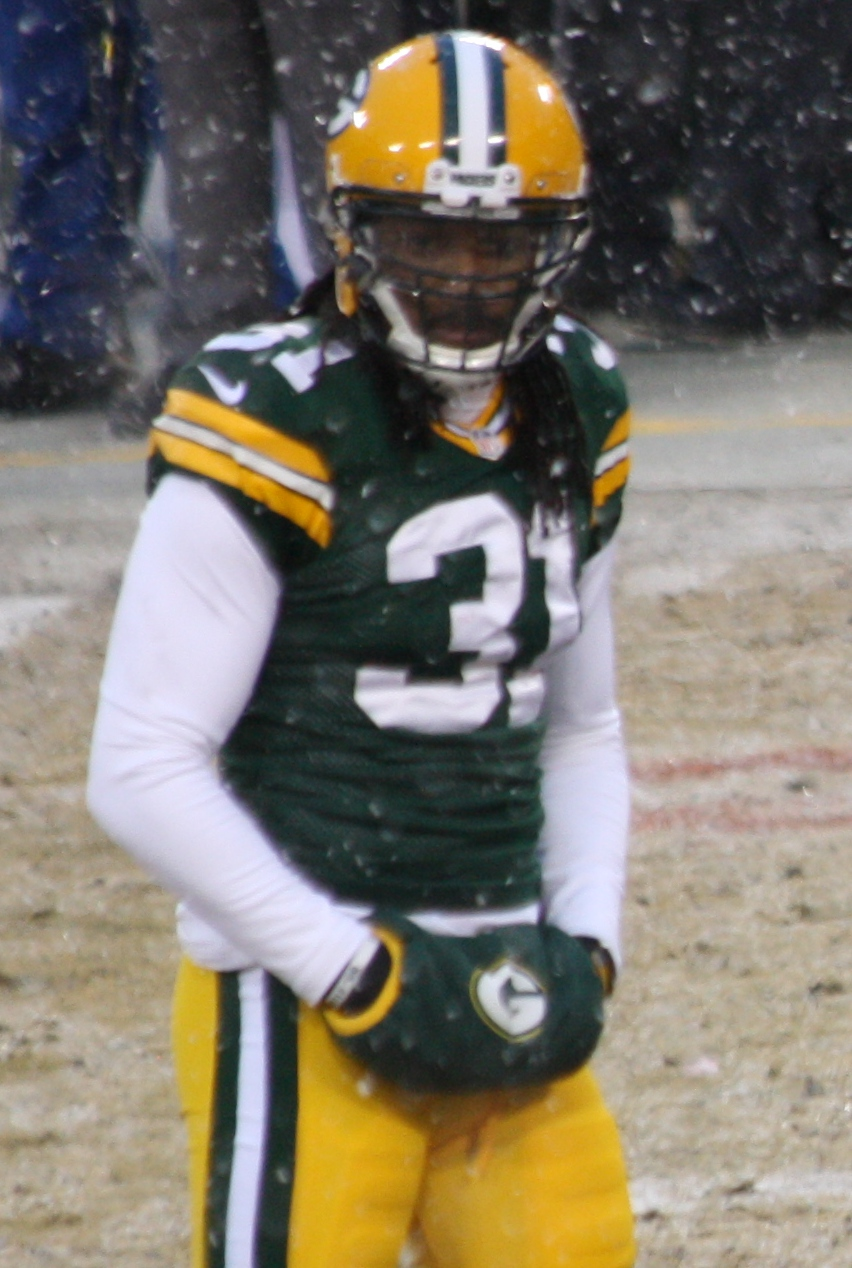
- House with the Green Bay Packers in 2013

No. 31
- Position: Cornerback

Personal information
- Born: July 10, 1989 (age 37); Van Nuys, California, U.S.
- Listed height: 6 ft 0 in (1.83 m)
- Listed weight: 195 lb (88 kg)

Career information
- High school: Palmdale (Palmdale, California)
- College: New Mexico State (2007–2010)
- NFL draft: 2011: 4th round, 131st overall pick

Career history
- Green Bay Packers (2011–2014); Jacksonville Jaguars (2015–2016); Green Bay Packers (2017–2018)

Awards and highlights
- 2× First-team All-WAC (2009, 2010)

Career NFL statistics
- Total tackles: 221
- Sacks: 3
- Forced fumbles: 2
- Pass deflections: 54
- Interceptions: 7
- Stats at Pro Football Reference

Davon Thomas House (born July 10, 1989) is an American former professional football player who was a cornerback in the National Football League (NFL). He played college football for the New Mexico State Aggies, and was selected by the Green Bay Packers in the fourth round of the 2011 NFL draft. He also played for the Jacksonville Jaguars.

== Early life ==
House attended Palmdale High School in Palmdale, California. Though he did not play football until his junior year in high school, he was part of a Palmdale Falcons team that went 9–2 and won the fifth Golden League Championship. He was also an All-Golden League selection in baseball and track & field. Following this season, House was selected to play in the Next Level All-Star Game and was rated as the Most Valuable Player. However, he was unrecognized by any recruiting service. House was also an All-Golden League selection in baseball and track & field.

== College career ==
House went on to play football at New Mexico State University, where he ranks sixth in Aggies' history in interceptions with 11.

House appeared in all thirteen games as a true freshman. He led the Aggies with four interceptions, and broke the school record for interception return yards in a game, a record that had stood since 1981. In his second career start, House tied an NCAA record with a 100-yard interception returned for a touchdown against Idaho. He finished the season with 37 tackles, 21 solo, eight pass break-ups, two tackles-for-a-loss, four interceptions with 171 return yards, 94 kickoff return yards and 283 all-purpose yards.

In his sophomore year, House started all twelve games at left corner. He recorded 40 tackles (1 for loss), two fumble recoveries and two interceptions.

House had a breakout year in 2009, starting all thirteen games at cornerback. During a game against the Louisiana Tech Bulldogs, House recovered a fumble and returned it 38 yards for the only score of the game. Later in 2009, against The University of Hawaii, House intercepted his second pass of the season in 2008 and returned it for a 58-yard touchdown. With this return, he broke the school record for interception yardage in a career. He also became the first player record both a fumble recovery for a touchdown, and an interception for a touchdown in the same season for the school since the mid-1990s. At the end of the season, House received first-team all-WAC honors after leading the league in passes defended and interceptions.

House once again started all 12 games in his final season at New Mexico State and recorded two more interceptions and closed out his college career by returning the second interception against Hawaii for a touchdown, making his career total interceptions 11. House also recorded 12 pass break-ups, a forced fumble, and 57 tackles. He was also named an honorable mention to the All-American team, and placed on the watch list for the Jim Thorpe Award.

== Professional career ==
=== Pre-draft ===
House was one of 56 defensive backs to attend the NFL Scouting Combine in Indianapolis, Indiana. It was anticipated that he would be one of the fastest defensive backs at the combine. He performed all of the combine drills and finished 13th among all defensive backs in the 40-yard dash. On March 19, 2011, House attended New Mexico State's pro day and attempted to have a better performance in a few combine drills. He ran the 40-yard dash (4.37s), 20-yard dash (2.55s), 10-yard dash (1.56s), and broad jump (9'1"). At the conclusion of the pre-draft process, House was projected to be a third or fourth round pick by NFL draft experts and analysts. He was ranked the seventh best cornerback prospect in the draft by DraftScout.com and was ranked the eighth best cornerback by WalterFootball.com.

External videos
- Davon House's NFL Combine workout

Pre-draft measurables
Height	Weight	Arm length	Hand span	Wingspan	40-yard dash	10-yard split	20-yard split	20-yard shuttle	Three-cone drill	Vertical jump	Broad jump	Bench press	Wonderlic
6 ft 0 1/2 in (1.84 m)	200 lb (91 kg)	31 7/8 in (0.81 m)	9 1/2 in (0.24 m)	6 ft 2 3/4 in (1.90 m)	4.37 s	1.56 s	2.55 s	4.12 s	6.65 s	33.5 in (0.85 m)	9 ft 1 in (2.77 m)	14 reps	15
All values from NFL Combine/Pro Day

=== Green Bay Packers (first stint) ===
==== 2011 ====
The Green Bay Packers selected House in the fourth round (131st overall) of the 2011 NFL draft. House was the 19th cornerback selected in 2011 and was the highest draft pick from New Mexico State since Joe Campbell was selected in the fourth round (91st overall) of 1988.

On July 29, 2011, the Packers signed House to a four-year, $2.34 million contract that included a signing bonus of $198,000.

Throughout training camp, House competed against veterans Jarrett Bush and Pat Lee for the spot as the fourth cornerback on the Packers' depth chart. Head coach Mike McCarthy named House the sixth cornerback on the depth chart to begin the regular season, behind Charles Woodson, Tramon Williams, Sam Shields, Jarrett Bush, and Pat Lee.

On October 23, 2011, House made his professional regular season debut during a 33–27 victory at the Minnesota Vikings after being inactive for the first six games. In Week 17, he made one solo tackle in the Packers' 45–41 victory at the Detroit Lions. He finished his rookie season in 2011 with one tackle in two games and zero starts.

==== 2012 ====
House entered training camp competing against Jarrett Bush, Sam Shields, and rookie Casey Hayward for the vacant starting cornerback spot after veteran Charles Woodson was moved to strong safety to replace Nick Collins, who was released due to health concerns. On August 8, 2012, House recorded four combined tackles and a pass deflection before leaving the Packers' 21–13 loss at the San Diego Chargers in the third quarter with a shoulder injury. He missed the remainder of the preseason and the first six regular season games. House was named the fifth cornerback to start the regular season, behind Tramon Williams, Sam Shields, Casey Hayward, and Jarrett Bush.

On October 21, 2012, House played in his first game of the season and made two solo tackles and a pass deflection in the Packers' 30–20 victory at the St. Louis Rams. He was named the third cornerback on the depth chart after Sam Shields suffered knee injury that caused him to miss six consecutive games (Weeks 6–13). In Week 8, House earned his first career start and blocked a punt that was recovered by linebacker Dezman Moses for a touchdown in a 24–15 victory over the Jacksonville Jaguars. He finished the game with four combined tackles and was awarded NFC Special Teams Player of the Week for his contributions. The following week, House recorded a season-high six solo tackles and a pass break up during a 31–17 win against the Arizona Cardinals. On November 18, 2012, House collected four combined tackles, deflected one pass, and made his first career sack on Matthew Stafford during a 24–20 victory at the Detroit Lions. House missed the Green Bay Packers' Week 17 loss at the Minnesota Vikings and both of their playoff games due to a hip injury. He finished the 2012 season with 26 combined tackles (20 solo), five pass deflections, and a sack in nine games and five starts. House played in a total of 318 defensive snaps and dealt with a shoulder injury the whole season, that required him to wear a harness in order to play.

==== 2013 ====
Defensive coordinator Dom Capers and cornerbacks coach Joe Whitt Jr. held an open competition for the starting cornerback jobs, between Davon House, Tramon Williams, Sam Shields, and Casey Hayward. Head coach Mike McCarthy named House the fourth cornerback behind Williams, Shields, and Hayward, to begin the regular season.

On October 20, 2013, House recorded three solo tackles, three pass break ups, and made his first career interception by Cleveland Browns' quarterback Brandon Weeden in a 31–13 victory. In Week 13, he made a season-high eight combined tackles and broke up a pass during 40–10 loss at the Detroit Lions. He finished the 2013 season with 44 combined tackles (36 solo), ten pass deflections, one interception, and a sack in 16 games and five starts.

The Green Bay Packers finished first in the NFC North with a record of 8–7–1. On January 5, 2014, House played in his first career playoff game and collected four solo tackles and two pass break ups in the Packers' 23–20 loss to the San Francisco 49ers in the NFC Wildcard game.

==== 2014 ====
In training camp, House competed for the third or fourth cornerback positions against Casey Hayward and Micah Hyde. He was named the fourth cornerback on the depth chart behind Tramon Williams, Sam Shields, and Casey Hayward at the start of the regular season.

In Week 3, House collected five solo tackles, one pass deflection, and intercepted a pass by Matt Stafford during a 17–9 loss at the Detroit Lions. He replaced Sam Shields as the starting outside cornerback for four games (Week 4, 6–8) after Shields suffered an injury to his left knee. On October 26, 2014, he recorded a season-high seven solo tackles and broke up a pass in the Packers' 44–23 loss at the New Orleans Saints. In Week 14, he suffered a serious shoulder injury during the Packers' 43–37 win against the Atlanta Falcons. He missed the remaining three games due to the injury (Weeks 15–17). House finished his last season in Green Bay with 27 solo tackles, ten pass deflections, and an interception in 13 games and four starts. The Green Bay Packers finished atop their division with a 12–4 record and defeated the Dallas Cowboys before losing to the Seattle Seahawks in the NFC Championship. He finished the lost with two solo tackles and two pass break ups.

House became an unrestricted free agent after the Packers decided not to offer a contract extension and allowed him to test the free agent market. He reiterated multiple times he wanted to remain in Green Bay. He attended private meetings and visits with multiple teams including the Minnesota Vikings, Chicago Bears, Philadelphia Eagles, Seattle Seahawks, Jacksonville Jaguars, and Oakland Raiders. The Green Bay Packers made a contract offer that was significantly less than Jacksonville's in an attempt to retain House after he was set to sign with the Jaguars.

=== Jacksonville Jaguars ===
==== 2015 ====
On March 11, 2015, the Jacksonville Jaguars signed House to a four-year, $24.5 million contract that included $10 million guaranteed. He reunited with his former head coach at New Mexico State, DeWayne Walker, who was serving as the Jaguars' defensive backs coach.

Head coach Gus Bradley named House the de facto starting cornerback prior to training camp. He made his debut in the Jacksonville Jaguars' season-opener against the Carolina Panthers and recorded two solo tackles and a pass break up in a 20–9 loss. In Week 7, House was benched in favor of Dwayne Gratz, but was reinserted into his starting role the following game. On November 15, 2015, House collected a season-high eight combined tackles, career-high four pass deflections, and intercepted Joe Flacco twice in the Jaguars' 22–20 victory over the Baltimore Ravens. In Week 17, he made a season-high six solo tackles, two pass break ups, and an interception during their 30–6 loss at the Houston Texans. He finished the 2015 season with a career-high 60 combined tackles (49 solo), 23 pass deflections, career-high four interceptions, and a forced fumble in 16 games and 15 starts. His 23 pass deflections set a single season franchise record.

==== 2016 ====
House saw significant competition for his starting role from newly acquired free agent Prince Amukamara and 2016 first round pick Jalen Ramsey. Head coach Gus Bradley named House and Ramsey the starting cornerbacks to begin the regular season.

On September 25, 2016, House recorded a season-high five solo tackles during a 19–17 loss to the Baltimore Ravens. The following week, he was benched during a 30–27 victory over the Indianapolis Colts. House was surpassed on the depth chart by Prince Amukamara and Aaron Colvin who returned from suspension in Week 6. House remained in a reserve role for the rest of the season. His declining play and benching was in relation to new defensive coordinator Todd Wash and a zone cover defense he implemented, where House succeeded under former defensive coordinator Bob Babich's man cover system. He finished the 2016 season with 17 combined tackles (15 solo) in 16 games and four starts.

On March 6, 2017, House was released by the Jaguars. House received immediate interest from the Green Bay Packers and attended a visit with the Pittsburgh Steelers.

=== Green Bay Packers (second stint) ===
==== 2017 ====
On March 14, 2017, the Green Bay Packers signed House to a one-year, $2.80 million contract that included a signing bonus of $850,000.

One of House's biggest headlines made during his second stint with the Packers happened prior to minicamp in early June 2017. After missing a connecting flight and arriving in Minneapolis after 11pm, Davon went to Twitter to find a ride to Green Bay. Brothers, Chad and Mike Johnson of Eau Claire and Hudson WI., came to the rescue. Davon toured the brothers through the Packers locker room at Lambeau Field garnering national fanfare.

Davon entered training camp as the starting cornerback, replacing Sam Shields after he was released due to health concerns. Head coach Mike McCarthy named House the starting cornerback, alongside Damarious Randall, to start the regular season. He missed two games (Weeks 3–4) after suffering a quadriceps injury. On October 22, 2017, House recorded six combined tackles, deflected two passes, and intercepted Drew Brees during the Packers' 26–17 loss to the New Orleans Saints. In Week 9, he collected a season-high nine combined tackles in a 30–17 loss to the Detroit Lions. The following week, House made a season-high tying eight solo tackles and a sack during a 23–16 victory at the Chicago Bears. He finished the 2017 season with 44 combined tackles (37 solo), six pass deflections, an interception, and a sack in 12 games and 12 starts.

==== 2018 ====
On April 13, 2018, the Packers re-signed House to a one-year, $1.005 million contract that included a $90,000 signing bonus. He was placed on injured reserve on September 25, 2018, with a shoulder injury.

==== Retirement ====
On February 11, 2020, House announced his retirement by signing a one-day contract to retire as a member of the Green Bay Packers.

== NFL career statistics ==
=== Regular season ===
Year	Team	Games		Tackles				Interceptions						Fumbles	
Year	Team	GP	GS	Cmb	Solo	Ast	Sck	PD	Int	Yds	Avg	Lng	TDs	FF	FR
2011	GB	2	0	1	1	0	0.0	0	0	0	0	0	0	0	0
2012	GB	9	5	26	20	6	1.0	5	0	0	0	0	0	0	0
2013	GB	16	5	44	36	8	1.0	10	1	11	11.0	11	0	0	0
2014	GB	13	4	27	27	0	0.0	10	1	0	0	0	0	1	0
2015	JAX	16	15	60	49	11	0.0	23	4	21	5.2	15	0	1	1
2016	JAX	16	4	17	14	3	0.0	0	0	0	0	0	0	0	0
2017	GB	12	12	44	37	7	1.0	0	1	2	0	0	0	0	0
2018	GB	3	0	2	1	1	0	0	0	0	0	0	0	0	0
Career		87	47	221	185	36	3.0	54	7	32	5.3	15	0	2	1
Source: NFL.com

=== Postseason ===
Year	Team	Games		Tackles				Interceptions						Fumbles	
Year	Team	GP	GS	Cmb	Solo	Ast	Sck	PD	Int	Yds	Avg	Lng	TDs	FF	FR
2013	GB	1	0	4	4	0	0.0	2	0	0	0.0	0	0	0	0
2014	GB	2	0	3	0	3	0.0	0	0	0	0.0	0	0	0	0
Career		3	0	7	4	3	0.0	2	0	0	0.0	0	0	0	0
Source: pro-football-reference.com
