= Casey Hayward =

American football player (born 1989)

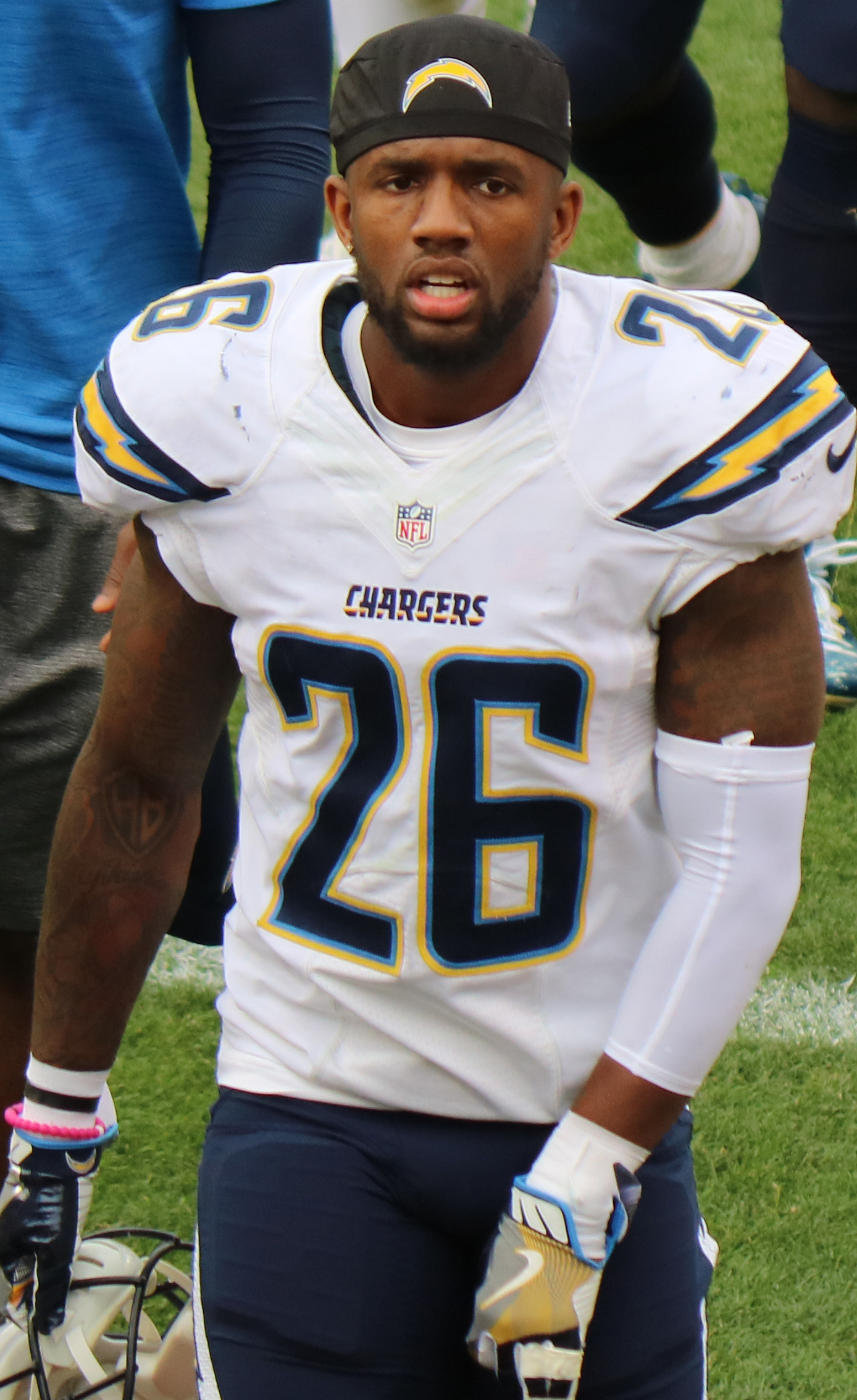
- Hayward with the San Diego Chargers in 2016

No. 29, 26
- Position: Cornerback

Personal information
- Born: September 9, 1989 (age 37); Perry, Georgia, U.S.
- Listed height: 5 ft 11 in (1.80 m)
- Listed weight: 192 lb (87 kg)

Career information
- High school: Perry
- College: Vanderbilt (2008–2011)
- NFL draft: 2012: 2nd round, 62nd overall pick

Career history
- Green Bay Packers (2012–2015); San Diego / Los Angeles Chargers (2016–2020); Las Vegas Raiders (2021); Atlanta Falcons (2022)

Awards and highlights
- 2× Second-team All-Pro (2016, 2017); 2× Pro Bowl (2016, 2017); NFL interceptions leader (2016); PFWA All-Rookie Team (2012); Second-team All-American (2011); 2× Second-team All-SEC (2010, 2011)

Career NFL statistics
- Total tackles: 448
- Pass deflections: 112
- Interceptions: 25
- Forced fumbles: 2
- Fumble recoveries: 4
- Defensive touchdowns: 3
- Stats at Pro Football Reference

Casey Hayward Jr. (born September 9, 1989) is an American former professional football cornerback. He played college football for the Vanderbilt Commodores. Hayward was selected by the Green Bay Packers in the second round of the 2012 NFL draft and has played in the National Football League (NFL) for the Packers, San Diego / Los Angeles Chargers, Las Vegas Raiders, and Atlanta Falcons.

== Early life ==
Hayward attended Perry High School, where he was a three-sport star in football, basketball and track. In football, he was a three-year starter at quarterback and also played several games at cornerback. As a senior, he led his team to the state quarterfinals by passing for 1,300 yards and 18 touchdowns as well as rushing for 1,284 yards and another 18 touchdowns. He also had four interceptions, three of which he returned for touchdowns. His performance had him named the Region 4-AAA Player of the Year. He was also named an All-State defensive back and an All-middle Georgia player. Hayward was also a member of the team's leadership council and a starting guard in basketball.

As an outstanding track & field athlete, Hayward excelled in sprints and jumps. At the 2008 Patriot Invitational, he earned a second-place finish in the triple jump event, posting a career-best leap of 13.93 meters (45 ft, 6 in), while also placing twelfth in the 100-meter dash, with a time of 11.48 seconds. He recorded a personal-best leap of 6.83 meters (22 ft, 3 in) in the long jump at the Harmon Invitational, where he took gold. He also ran a PR of 22.75 seconds in the 200-meter dash. In addition, he ran the 40-yard dash in 4.43 seconds, bench-pressed 255 pounds, squatted 400 pounds and had a 33-inch vertical.

Coming out of high school, Hayward was measured to be 6 ft. 1 in. and 185 pounds. He received very few scholarship offers from division schools, which he attributed to being "strictly a quarterback". He was scouted by Georgia Tech, Louisville, Middle Tennessee State, North Carolina, Southern Miss, and Troy.

== College career ==
Hayward ultimately chose to attend Vanderbilt University because of the school's academic ranking and the fact that the school is a member of the Southeastern Conference. He immediately played during his freshman year and made his permanent move to cornerback as a nickelback and also on special teams.

In 2009, he was promoted to the starting role and played in every game, although he did miss most of two games due to injury. He was named the defensive player of the week against LSU after contributing 13 tackles (eight solo) with 4 for a loss. He was also named the team's most valuable defensive back.

Hayward continued to make an impact going into 2010 and started every game of the season. He had six interceptions, 70 tackles (59 solo), and 17 passes defended. He ranked first in the SEC and 3rd in the NCAA for passes defended. His performance earned him a spot on the second-team All-SEC as a defensive back by the coaches and media.

During his final season as a Vanderbilt Commodore, Hayward tied the career record for interceptions at 15 (also held by Leonard Coleman). He also made 62 tackles, and had seven interceptions, the third highest single season total by a Vanderbilt player. He was named a mid-season All-American by Sports Illustrated. At the end of the season, Hayward was named a second-team All-American by the Walter Camp Foundation, becoming the first Vanderbilt All-American in four years.

== Professional career ==
=== Pre-draft ===
On January 9, 2012, it was announced that Hayward had accepted his invitation to play in the 2012 Senior Bowl. On January 28, 2012, he made a pass deflection and intercepted a pass by Michigan State quarterback Kirk Cousins as part of Washington Redskins' head coach Mike Shanahan's South team that lost 23–13 to the North. Hayward was one of 59 collegiate defensive backs to attend the NFL Scouting Combine in Indianapolis, Indiana. He completed all of the combine drills, finishing tied for tenth in the bench press among his position group and 25th in the 40-yard dash. On March 23, 2012, Hayward attended Vanderbilt's pro day, but opted to stand on his combine numbers and only performed positional drills. Scouts praised his intelligence and instincts as well as his ability to recognize routes. They also stated that he was a good tackler with good footwork and durability. At the conclusion of the pre-draft process, Hayward was projected to be a second or third-round pick by NFL draft experts and analysts. He was ranked the fourth best cornerback prospect by NFL analyst Mike Mayock, was ranked the ninth best cornerback by NFLDraftScout.com, and was ranked the 12th best cornerback by NFL analyst Gil Brandt.

External videos
- Hayward's NFL Combine Workout

Pre-draft measurables
Height	Weight	Arm length	Hand span	Wingspan	40-yard dash	10-yard split	20-yard split	20-yard shuttle	Three-cone drill	Vertical jump	Broad jump	Bench press
5 ft 11 3/8 in (1.81 m)	192 lb (87 kg)	30 1/4 in (0.77 m)	9 in (0.23 m)	6 ft 1 1/4 in (1.86 m)	4.57 s	1.62 s	2.65 s	3.90 s	6.76 s	34 in (0.86 m)	9 ft 11 in (3.02 m)	19 reps
All values from NFL Combine

=== Green Bay Packers ===
The Green Bay Packers selected Hayward in the second round (62nd overall) of the 2012 NFL draft. The Green Bay Packers had to orchestrate a trade with the New England Patriots in order to acquire the 62nd overall pick used to draft Hayward and agreed to exchange their 2012 third (90th overall) and fifth-round picks (163rd overall). He was the fifth cornerback selected in 2012 and Vanderbilt's highest defensive back drafted since Fred Vinson in 1999.

External videos
- Packers draft Hayward 62nd overall
- First Draft: Vanderbilt's Casey Hayward

==== 2012 ====
On May 11, 2012, the Green Bay Packers signed Hayward to a four–year, $3.30 million contract that includes $1.03 million guaranteed and an initial signing bonus of $847,208.

Throughout training camp, Hayward competed against Jarrett Bush, Sam Shields, and Davon House for the vacant starting cornerback spot after veteran Charles Woodson was moved to strong safety to replace Nick Collins, who was released due to health concerns. Head coach Mike McCarthy named Hayward the fourth cornerback on the depth chart to start the season, behind starters Sam Shields, Tramon Williams, and primary backup Jarrett Bush.

On September 9, 2012, he made his professional regular season debut in the Green Bay Packers' season-opener against the San Francisco 49ers and recorded one solo tackle in their 30–23 loss. On October 7, 2012, Hayward recorded two combined tackles (one solo), broke up a pass, and made his first career interception off a pass attempt thrown by Andrew Luck to wide receiver Reggie Wayne in the fourth quarter of the Packers' 30–27 loss to the Indianapolis Colts. The following week, Hayward broke up three passes and intercepted two passes by Matt Schaub and T. J. Yates during the Packers' 42–24 victory at the Houston Texans in Week 6. On October 25, 2012, Hayward earned his first career start after Sam Shields injured his shin and knee and went on to record three solo tackles, make one pass deflection, and intercepted a pass thrown by Sam Bradford to wide receiver Chris Givens as they defeated the St. Louis Rams 30–20. He was named the NFL defensive Rookie of the Month for October due to his four interceptions in three games. He finished third for NFL Defensive Rookie of the Year and was named to the NFL All-Joes team.

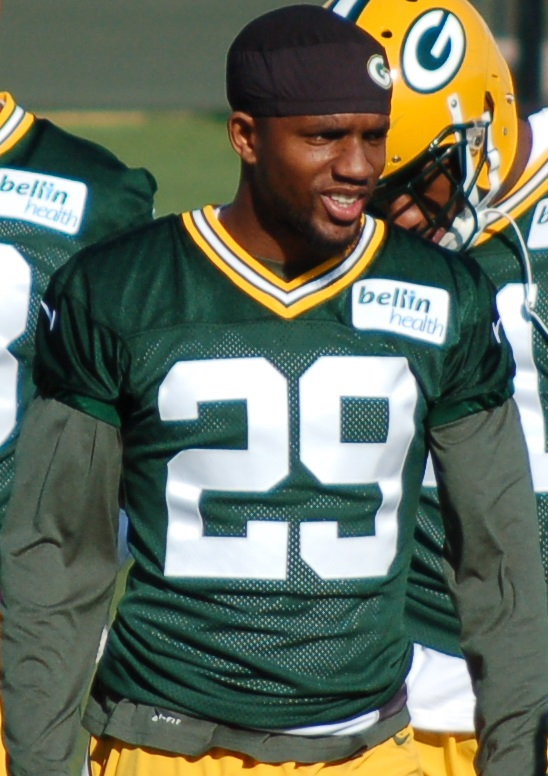
Hayward with the Packers in 2015.

In Week 8, Hayward recorded a season-high eight combined tackles (six solo) in the Packers' 24–15 victory over the Jacksonville Jaguars. On November 18, 2012, he produced five combined tackles (four solo), a career-high four pass deflections, and intercepted a pass by Matthew Stafford during a 24–20 win at the Detroit Lions. In Week 15, he made one solo tackle, one pass deflection, and had his sixth interception of the season off a pass by Jay Cutler in a 21–13 victory at the Chicago Bears. He finished his rookie campaign in 2012 with 53 combined tackles (40 solo), 22 pass deflections, and six interceptions in 16 games and seven starts. He was named to the PFWA All-Rookie Team.

The Green Bay Packers finished the 2012 NFL season first in the NFC North with an 11–5 record and received a playoff berth. On January 5, 2013, Hayward played in his first career playoff game and collected four solo tackles in the 24–10 win against the Minnesota Vikings in the NFC Wildcard game. The Packers were defeated 45–31 by the San Francisco 49ers the following game. Hayward earned the highest overall grade of any slot corner ever graded by Pro Football Focus.

==== 2013 ====
Defensive coordinator Dom Capers and cornerbacks coach Joe Whitt Jr. held an open competition between Hayward, Davon House, Tramon Williams, Sam Shields, Micah Hyde, and Jarrett Bush for a spot as a starting cornerback. He fell behind in training camp following a hamstring injury that sidelined him for two weeks. Head coach Mike McCarthy named Hayward the third cornerback behind Williams and Shields to begin the regular season.

On August 23, 2013, Hayward returned for the third preseason game and recorded a tackle, a pass deflection, and made an interception before leaving the 17–10 loss to the Seattle Seahawks after aggravating his hamstring injury. He missed the last preseason game and first six regular season games (Weeks 1–6) with a hamstring injury. He returned prior to Week 8 and was the third cornerback on the depth chart behind Tramon Williams and Sam Shields. In Week 8, he recorded a solo tackle in the Packers' 44–31 victory at the Minnesota Vikings. The following week, Hayward collected a season-high seven combined tackles (five solo) in a 27–20 loss to the Chicago Bears. On November 23, 2013, the Green Bay Packers placed Hayward on injured reserve for the remainder of the season. He finished the 2013 season with eight combined tackles (five solo) in three games and one start.

==== 2014 ====
Throughout training camp in 2014, Hayward competed for the third and fourth cornerback positions against Davon House and Micah Hyde for the position as the third cornerback on the depth chart and as the starting nickelback. Head coach Mike McCarthy named him the third cornerback on the depth chart, behind starting tandem Sam Shields and Tramon Williams, to begin the season.

In Week 7, he produced three solo tackles, a pass deflection, and intercepted a pass by Cam Newton to wide receiver Brenton Bersin in a 38–17 victory against the Carolina Panthers. On October 26, 2014, Hayward recorded a season-high six combined tackles (five solo) during a 44–23 loss at the New Orleans Saints. On November 9, 2014, Hayward made three solo tackles, a pass deflection, and intercepted a pass by Jay Cutler to running back Matt Forte that was deflected off the helmet of Kyle Long and returned it for 82–yards and scored his first career touchdown as the Packers routed the Chicago Bears 55–14. On November 16, 2014, he recorded one solo tackle and recovered a fumble after Mark Sanchez failed to handle a high shotgun snap and returned it 49–yards for a touchdown as the Packers routed the Philadelphia Eagles 53–20. He finished the 2014 season with 42 combined tackles (33 solo), seven pass deflections, and 3 interceptions in 16 games and one start.

==== 2015 ====
Throughout training camp Hayward competed against rookies Damarious Randall and Quinten Rollins to be the No. 2 starting cornerback after it was available following the departures of Tramon Williams and Davon House in free agency. Head coach Mike McCarthy named Hayward and Shields the starting cornerback duo to begin the season.

On November 1, 2015, Hayward recorded a season-high seven combined tackles (six solo) and a season-high three pass deflections during a 29–10 loss at the Denver Broncos. Hayward finished the 2015 season with a career-high 65 combined tackles (56 solo) and seven pass deflections in 16 games and 11 starts. He played outside corner during the majority of the season, but also played nickelback when Damarious Randall was used on the outside with Shields. Hayward led all Packers' cornerbacks in tackles and with 908 snaps on defense.

The Green Bay Packers finished the 2015 NFL season second in their division with a 10–6 record, clinching a Wildcard berth. On January 10, 2016, Hayward started in a playoff game for the first time in his career and collected seven combined tackles (five solo) and a pass deflection during a 35–18 win at the Washington Redskins in the NFC Wildcard Game. They were eliminated the following week after being defeated at the Arizona Cardinals 20–26 in the NFC Divisional round.

He became an unrestricted free agent for the first time in his career after the Green Bay Packers decided not to offer him a new contract despite setting career-high number in tackles and starts in 2015. The decision surprised Hayward and Aaron Rodgers but was considered reasonable by members of Packers media coverage. He received interest from a few teams, including the San Francisco 49ers, Arizona Cardinals, Dallas Cowboys, and San Diego Chargers.

=== San Diego / Los Angeles Chargers ===
==== 2016 ====
On March 13, 2016, the San Diego Chargers signed Hayward to a three–year, $15.30 million contract that includes $6.80 million guaranteed and an initial signing bonus of $2.50 million.

Throughout training camp, Hayward competed for the job as the starting outside cornerback against Brandon Flowers. Head coach Mike McCoy named Hayward the starting nickelback to begin the regular season. He was also named the third cornerback on the depth chart, behind Jason Verrett and Brandon Flowers.

On September 11, 2016, he made his Chargers' debut and started in the San Diego Chargers' season-opener at the Kansas City Chiefs and recorded four combined tackles (two solo) and defended two passes in the Chargers' 33–27 loss. On September 18, 2016, Hayward collected four solo tackles, two pass break ups, and intercepted Jacksonville Jaguars' quarterback Blake Bortles twice in their 38–14 victory. In Week 5, Hayward collected a season-high eight solo tackles in San Diego's 34–31 loss at the Oakland Raiders. On October 30, 2016, he recorded three combined tackles (two solo), a season-high three pass deflections, and intercepted a pass by Trevor Siemian to Jordan Norwood and returned it 24–yards for a touchdown in a 27–19 loss at the Denver Broncos. The following week, he made three combined tackles (two solo), a pass deflection, and intercepted a pass by Marcus Mariota during a 43–35 win against the Tennessee Titans. In Week 13, Hayward made one pass deflection and set a career-high with his seventh interception of the season off a pass thrown by Jameis Winston in a 21–28 loss to the Tampa Bay Buccaneers. On December 20, 2016, he was named to his first Pro Bowl. He finished the 2016 season with 58 combined tackles (51 solo), 20 pass deflections, seven interceptions, and a touchdown in 16 games and 14 starts. He finished first in the league with seven interceptions and second with 20 passes defensed and was named second-team All-Pro. He was also ranked 64th on the NFL Top 100 Players of 2017.

The San Diego Chargers finished last in the AFC West with a 5–11 record and head coach Mike McCoy was fired. The team also relocated to Los Angeles during the off season.

==== 2017 ====
Former Buffalo Bills' offensive coordinator Anthony Lynn was hired as the Chargers' new head coach. Hayward entered camp as the de facto starting cornerback after Brandon Flowers was released. Head coach Anthony Lynn officially named Hayward and Jason Verrett the starting cornerbacks to start the regular season.

On September 11, 2017, Hayward started in the Los Angeles Chargers' season-opener against the Denver Broncos on Monday Night Football and recorded four combined tackles (three solo), a pass break up, and fumble recovery during their 24–21 loss. During the third quarter, Hayward recovered a fumble by Jamaal Charles after it was forced by Chargers' linebacker Korey Toomer. The following week, Hayward collected a season-high five combined tackles (three solo) during a 19–17 loss to the Miami Dolphins. On October 1, 2017, Hayward made one solo tackle and a career-high five pass deflections during a 24–26 loss to the Philadelphia Eagles. On November 19, 2017, he made four solo tackles, three pass deflections, and a season-high two interceptions off pass thrown by Nathan Peterman as the Chargers routed the Buffalo Bills 54–24. On December 19, 2017, Hayward was named to his second Pro Bowl. He finished the 2017 season with a total of 40 combined tackles (33 solo), a career-high 22 pass break ups, and four interceptions in 16 games and 16 starts. Pro Football Focus gave Hayward an overall grade of 96.4. His overall grade was first among all qualifying cornerbacks for 2017 and PFF also voted him the top coverage defender of the season. He was ranked 59th by his fellow players on the NFL Top 100 Players of 2018.

==== 2018 ====
On March 11, 2018, the Los Angeles Chargers signed Hayward to a three–year, $33.25 million contract extension that includes $20.00 million guaranteed and an initial signing bonus of $8.00 million. The contract is worth up to $36 million with incentives and keeps Hayward under contract through the 2021 season.

On November 4, 2018, Hayward made a season-high five solo tackles and one pass deflection during a 25–17 loss at the Seattle Seahawks. He started in all 16 games in the 2018 NFL season and produced 46 combined tackles (41 solo) and eight pass deflections.

==== 2019 ====
He entered training camp slated as the de facto No. 1 starting cornerback following the departure of Jason Verrett. Defensive coordinator Gus Bradley named Hayward and Michael Davis the starting cornerbacks to begin the regular season.

In week 2 against the Detroit Lions, Hayward recorded his first interception of the season off Matthew Stafford in the 13–10 loss. On October 20, 2019, he recorded a season-high five combined tackles (four solo) as the Chargers lost 23–20 at the Tennessee Titans. In Week 8, Hayward made two solo tackles, a season-high three pass deflections, and intercepted a pass by Mitchell Trubisky intended for tight end Trey Burton during a 17–16 victory at the Chicago Bears. He started all 16 games during the 2019 NFL season and accrued a total of 32 combined tackles (28 solo), eight pass deflections, and two interceptions.

==== 2020 ====
He returned as the Chargers' No. 1 starting cornerback and was paired with Chris Harris Jr. On September 13, 2020, Hayward started in the Los Angeles Chargers' season-opener at the Cincinnati Bengals and recorded a career-high 12 solo tackles and made two pass deflections during the 16–13 win. He was named the AFC Defensive Player of the Week for his performance in Week 1. He was inactive for a Week 12 loss at the Buffalo Bills after injuring his groin. In Week 16, Hayward recorded one solo tackle, a pass deflection, and made his first interception of the season off a pass thrown by Drew Lock before exiting the game with a hamstring injury as the Chargers defeated the Denver Broncos 19–16. He was subsequently sidelined for the Los Angeles Chargers' Week 17 victory at the Kansas City Chiefs. On January 1, 2021, Hayward was placed on injured reserve. He finished the season with 41 tackles, eight passes defensed and one interception.

==== 2021 ====
On March 13, 2021, the Los Angeles Chargers released Hayward.

=== Las Vegas Raiders ===
On May 4, 2021, the Las Vegas Raiders signed Hayward to a fully guaranteed one–year, $2.50 million contract that includes a $1.00 million signing bonus. He was reunited with his defensive coordinator with the Los Angeles Chargers from the previous season, Las Vegas Raiders' defensive coordinator Gus Bradley. He entered training camp projected to be the No. 2 starting cornerback ahead of Damon Arnette, Amik Robertson, Rasul Douglas, and Nate Hobbs. Head coach John Gruden named Hayward a starting cornerback to begin the season, alongside Trayvon Mullen.

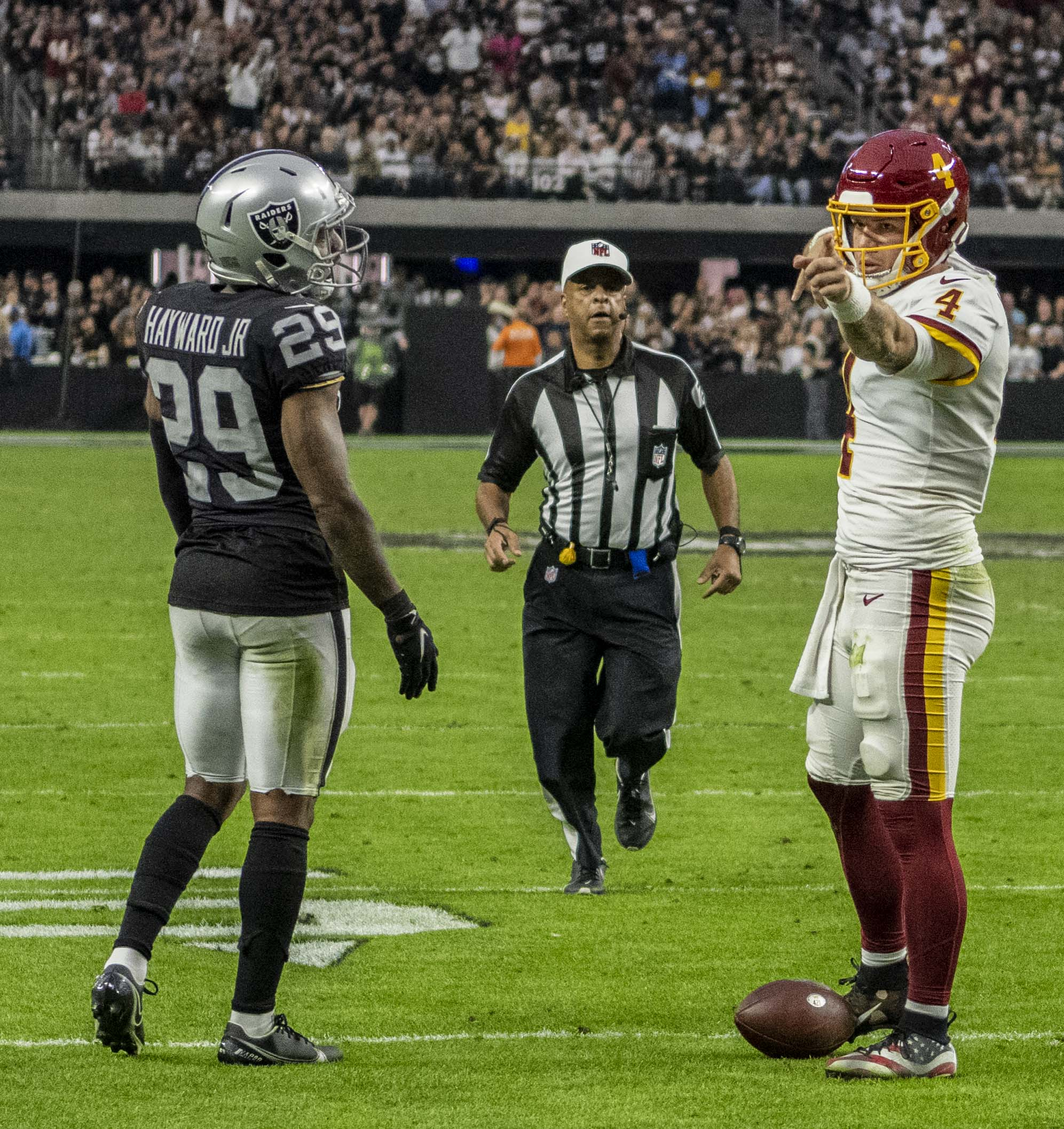
Hayward (left) playing against the Washington Football Team in 2021.

On September 26, 2021, Hayward made four solo tackles and earned the first safety of his career for two points after tackling wide receiver Jaylen Waddle in the end zone during the first quarter of a 31–28 victory against the Miami Dolphins. On October 11, 2021, the Las Vegas Raiders fired head coach John Gruden after multiple controversies and named special teams coordinator Rich Bisaccia as the interim head coach. In Week 12, he collected a season-high six combined tackles (five solo) as the Raiders won 36–33 at the Dallas Cowboys. On January 9, 2022, Hayward made three solo tackles, a season-high three pass deflections, and intercepted a pass thrown by Justin Herbert to wide receiver Mike Williams during a 35–32 win against his former team, the Los Angeles Chargers. He started all 17 games during the 2021 NFL season and recorded a total of 46 combined tackles (39 solo), nine pass deflections, and one interception.

=== Atlanta Falcons ===
On March 17, 2022, the Atlanta Falcons signed Hayward to a two–year, $11.00 million contract that included $6.00 million guaranteed upon signing and an initial signing bonus of $4.00 million.

Throughout training camp, he competed to be a starting cornerback against Dee Alford, Mike Ford, and Isaiah Oliver. Head coach Arthur Smith named him the No. 2 starting cornerback to begin the season, alongside No. 1 starting cornerback A. J. Terrell. On September 18, 2022, Hayward made two solo tackles, a pass deflection, and intercepted a pass thrown by Matthew Stafford to tight end Tyler Higbee as the Falcons lost 27–31 at the Los Angeles Rams. On October 18, 2022, the Atlanta Falcons placed Hayward on injured reserve after suffering a shoulder injury in Week 6. He finished the 2022 NFL season with a total of 17 combined tackles (14 solo), three pass deflections, and one interception in six games and six starts.

On April 21, 2023, Hayward was released with a failed physical designation.

== NFL career statistics ==
Legend
	Led the league
**Bold**	Career high

=== Regular season ===
Year	Team	Games		Tackles				Interceptions					
Year	Team	GP	GS	Cmb	Solo	Ast	Sck	Int	Yds	Avg	Lng	TD	PD
2012	GB	16	7	53	40	**13**	0.0	6	81	13.5	24	0	20
2013	GB	3	1	8	5	3	0.0	0	0	0.0	0	0	0
2014	GB	16	1	42	33	9	0.0	3	**113**	**37.7**	**82T**	**1**	7
2015	GB	16	11	**65**	**56**	9	0.0	0	0	0.0	0	0	7
2016	SD	16	14	58	51	7	0.0	**7**	102	14.6	31	**1**	20
2017	LAC	16	16	40	33	7	0.0	4	7	1.8	7	0	**22**
2018	LAC	16	16	46	41	5	0.0	0	0	0.0	0	0	8
2019	LAC	16	16	32	28	4	0.0	2	37	18.5	37	0	8
2020	LAC	14	13	41	36	5	0.0	1	9	9.0	9	0	8
2021	LV	**17**	**17**	46	39	7	0.0	1	0	0.0	0	0	9
2022	ATL	6	6	17	14	3	0.0	1	0	0.0	0	0	3
Career		152	118	448	376	72	0.0	25	349	14.0	82T	2	112

=== Postseason ===
Year	Team	Games		Tackles				Interceptions					
Year	Team	GP	GS	Cmb	Solo	Ast	Sck	Int	Yds	Avg	Lng	TD	PD
2012	GB	**2**	0	4	4	0	0.0	0	0	0.0	0	0	0
2014	GB	**2**	0	4	4	0	0.0	0	0	0.0	0	0	1
2015	GB	**2**	**2**	**12**	**9**	**3**	0.0	0	0	0.0	0	0	**2**
2018	LAC	**2**	**2**	8	7	1	0.0	0	0	0.0	0	0	1
2021	LV	1	1	1	1	0	0.0	0	0	0.0	0	0	1
Career		9	5	29	25	4	0.0	0	0	0.0	0	0	5

== Personal life ==
Hayward was raised in Perry, Georgia, by his parents Casey and Tish Hayward and began playing youth football when he was five years old. His mother Tish died from breast cancer in July 2016.

On November 27, 2017, it was reported that Hayward's younger brother, Jecavesia Hayward, died after a Toyota Camry he was a passenger in crashed into a tractor trailer that was stopped in the emergency lane on Interstate 75. His brother was ejected from the vehicle and hit by passing vehicles. Hayward was allowed to leave the team's facilities and immediately traveled home to be with his family.

=== Philanthropy ===
Hayward is involved in many philanthropic endeavors and started his own charity aptly named the Hayward's Hands Foundation. Through the Hayward's Hands Foundation, Hayward donates scholarships to teenagers in his hometown that display hard work and dedication to school, athletics, and to their community. On May 5, 2015, he awarded two $5,000 scholarships to two female students that attend his high school alma mater. Hayward also announced his foundation will continue to award scholarships to students and agreed to pledge $50,000.
