= Tramon Williams =

American football player (born 1983)

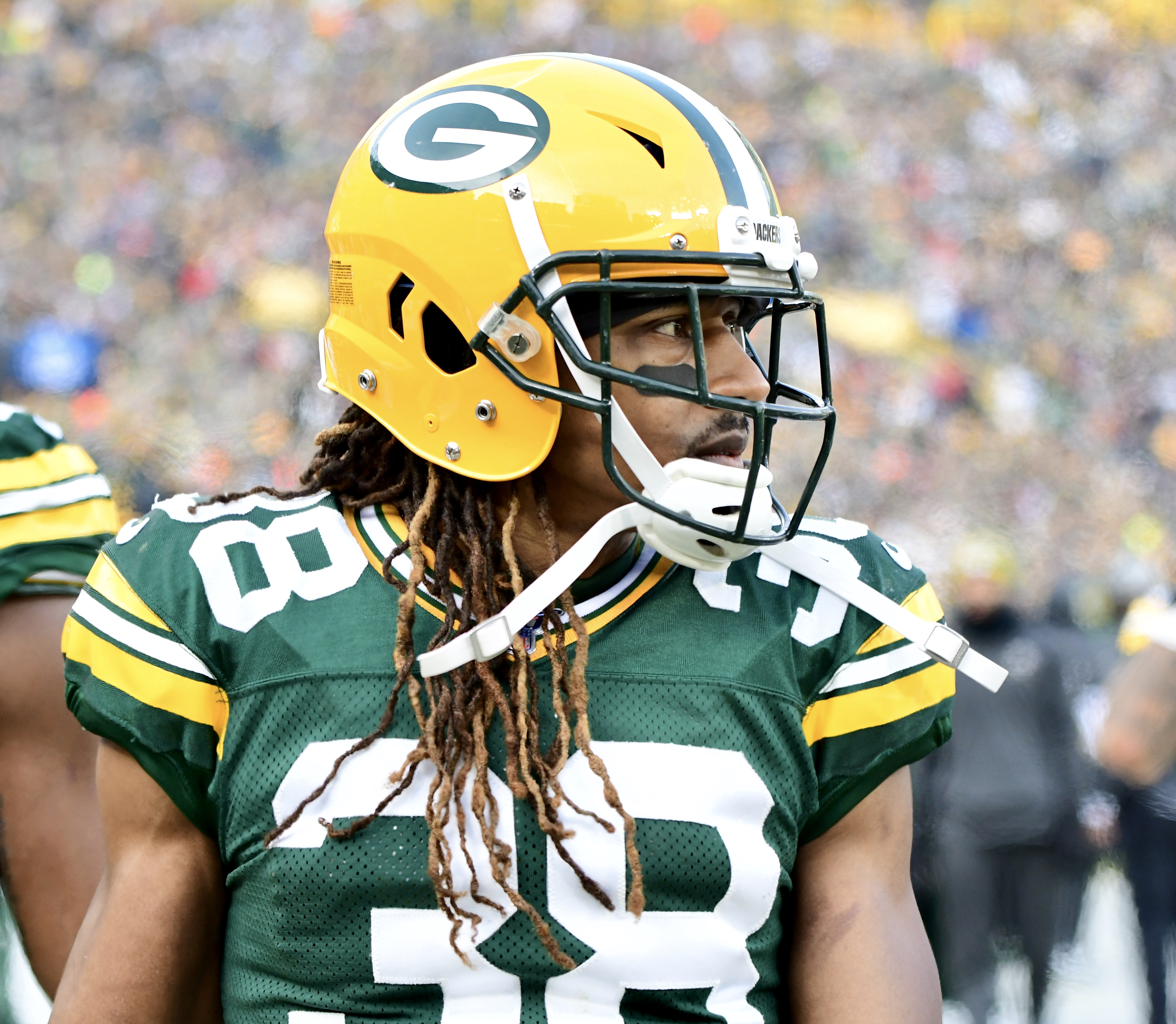
- Williams with the Green Bay Packers in 2019

No. 38, 22, 25, 29
- Position: Cornerback

Personal information
- Born: March 16, 1983 (age 43); Houma, Louisiana, U.S.
- Listed height: 5 ft 11 in (1.80 m)
- Listed weight: 191 lb (87 kg)

Career information
- High school: Assumption (Napoleonville, Louisiana)
- College: Louisiana Tech (2002–2005)
- NFL draft: 2006: undrafted

Career history
- Houston Texans (2006)*; Green Bay Packers (2006–2014); Cleveland Browns (2015–2016); Arizona Cardinals (2017); Green Bay Packers (2018–2019); Baltimore Ravens (2020); Green Bay Packers (2020)
- * Offseason or practice squad member only

Awards and highlights
- Super Bowl champion (XLV); Pro Bowl (2010); Green Bay Packers Hall of Fame

Career NFL statistics
- Total tackles: 677
- Sacks: 4.5
- Forced fumbles: 6
- Pass deflections: 153
- Interceptions: 34
- Total touchdowns: 2
- Stats at Pro Football Reference

Tramon Vernell Williams Sr. (born March 16, 1983) is an American former professional football player who was a cornerback for 15 seasons in the National Football League (NFL). He played college football for the Louisiana Tech Bulldogs, and was signed by the Houston Texans as an undrafted free agent in 2006. Williams spent much of his NFL career with the Green Bay Packers, playing with them from 2006 to 2014, and again in the 2018, 2019, and 2020 seasons. He was also a member of the Cleveland Browns, Arizona Cardinals, and Baltimore Ravens.

== Early life and college ==
Williams played football, basketball and ran track at Assumption High School in Napoleonville, Louisiana, but was overlooked by college football recruiters who instead scouted his teammate and friend Brandon Jacobs. In basketball, he was a four-year letter winner, winning another district title on the hardwood. In his only year of track, he finished second in the state in the long jump, second in the triple jump and third in the high jump.

After graduating in 2001, Williams attended Louisiana Tech University. Originally intending to study electrical engineering, he earned Bachelor's degrees in sociology and computer science. He had joined the Bulldogs football team as a walk-on in his freshman year. He became a starting cornerback by his junior season, and started every game for the Bulldogs during his senior season.

=== College statistics ===
Season	Team	GP	Tackles			Interceptions						Fumbles	
Season	Team	GP	Cmb	Solo	Ast	PD	Int	Yds	Avg	Lng	TD	FF	FR
2003	Louisiana Tech	10	3	2	1	0	0	0	0.0	0	0	0	0
2004	Louisiana Tech	12	45	20	25	13	4	2	0.5	2	0	0	0
2005	Louisiana Tech	11	43	29	14	19	3	50	16.7	50	0	1	0
Total		33	91	51	40	32	7	52	7.4	50	0	1	0
Source: LATechSports.com

== Professional career ==
Pre-draft measurables
Height	Weight	40-yard dash	20-yard shuttle	Three-cone drill	Vertical jump	Broad jump	Bench press
5 ft 11 1/8 in (1.81 m)	194 lb (88 kg)	4.57 s	4.20 s	6.95 s	37.5 in (0.95 m)	10 ft 7 in (3.23 m)	13 reps
All values from Louisiana Tech's Pro Day

=== Houston Texans ===
Williams was not among the 23 cornerbacks selected in the 2006 NFL draft and would go undrafted. On May 1, 2006, the Houston Texans signed Williams to a three-year, $1.09 million contract that includes an initial signing bonus of $10,000.

Throughout training camp, Williams competed for a roster spot as a backup cornerback and special teams player against Kevin Garrett, Von Hutchins, Derrick Johnson, and Earthwind Moreland. On September 5, 2006, the Houston Texans released Williams as part of their final roster cuts.

=== Green Bay Packers (first stint) ===
==== 2006 ====
On November 29, 2006, the Green Bay Packers signed Williams to their practice squad. He spent the remainder of the 2006 season on their practice squad.

==== 2007 ====
During training camp, Williams competed for a job as a backup cornerback against Jarrett Bush, Patrick Dendy, Frank Walker, Will Blackmon, and Antonio Malone. Head coach Mike McCarthy named Williams the sixth cornerback on the depth chart to begin the regular season, behind Al Harris, Charles Woodson, Jarrett Bush, Frank Walker, and Will Blackmon. Special teams coordinator Mike Stock also selected Williams to be the secondary kick returner and the fourth-string punt returner.

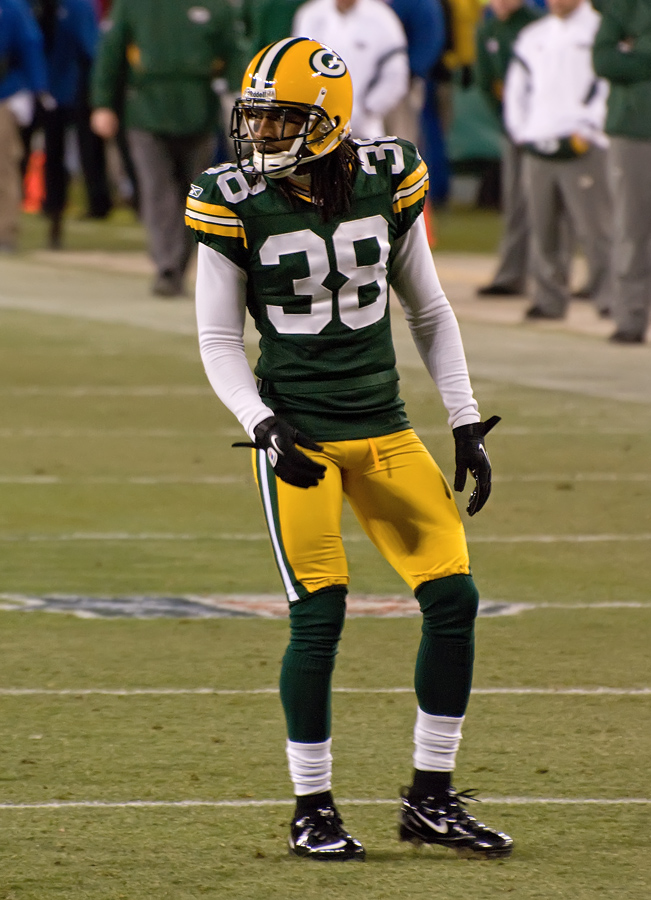
Tramon Williams with the Packers in 2011.

On September 9, 2007, Williams made his professional regular season debut in the Green Bay Packers' season-opener against the Philadelphia Eagles and returned four kickoffs for a total of 100-yards in their 17–16 victory. In Week 5, Williams had six kickoff returns for a total of 173-yards during a 27–20 loss to the Chicago Bears. In Week 6, Williams recorded his first career tackle in the Packers' 17–14 win against the Washington Redskins. By mid-season, Williams had surpassed Blackmon and Walker on the depth chart to become the fourth cornerback. On November 18, 2007, Williams scored his first career touchdown on a 94–yard punt return during the Packers' 31–17 win against the Carolina Panthers. On November 22, 2007, Williams recorded a season-high four solo tackles and two pass deflections during a 47–36 victory at the Detroit Lions in Week 12. On December 30, 2007, Williams earned his first career start after Charles Woodson injured his toe and was inactive. He made a season-high four solo tackles, two pass deflections, and had his first career interception on a pass thrown by Jon Kitna to wide receiver Shaun McDonald as the Packers defeated the Detroit Lions 34–13. He finished the 2007 season with 19 combined tackles (17 solo), four pass deflections, and an interception in 16 games and one start.

The Green Bay Packers finished the 2007 NFL season first in the NFC North with a 13–3 record and received home–field advantage and a first–round bye. On January 12, 2008, Williams appeared in the first career playoff game and made four solo tackles and a pass deflection during a 42–20 win against the Seattle Seahawks in the NFC Divisional Round. On January 20, 2007, he made two solo tackles, broke up a pass, and recovered a fumble as the Packers lost 23–20 to the New York Giants, who eventually won Super Bowl XLII, in the NFC Championship.

==== 2008 ====
During training camp, Williams competed against Jarrett Bush and Will Blackmon to be the third cornerback on the depth chart. Defensive coordinator Bob Sanders named Williams the third cornerback on the depth chart to start the regular season, behind starting cornerbacks Al Harris and Charles Woodson.

In Week 2, Williams earned his first start of the season after Al Harris sustained a spleen injury the previous week and made four solo tackles during a 48–25 win at the Detroit Lions. On September 28, 2008, he recorded two combined tackles, broke up two passes, and had his first interception of the season on a pass by quarterback Brian Griese to wide receiver Michael Clayton during a 30–21 loss at the Tampa Bay Buccaneers. The following week, he collected a season-high 11 combined tackles (ten solo), a pass deflection, and intercepted a pass by Matt Ryan in the Packers' 27–24 loss in Week 5 to the Atlanta Falcons. On October 12, 2008, Williams made a solo tackle, broke up a pass, and an interception in a 27–17 win at the Seattle Seahawks in Week 6. His interception off of Charlie Frye marked his third consecutive game with a pick. On December 7, 2008, he produced six combined tackles (five solo), a season-high tying two pass deflections, recovered a fumble, and had his fifth interception of the season on a pass by Matt Schaub to wide receiver André Davis during a 21–24 loss against the Houston Texans. He finished his sophomore season in 2008 with a total of 57 combined tackles (52 solo), 14 pass deflections, and five interceptions in 16 games and nine starts.

==== 2009 ====
On May 13, 2009, the Green Bay Packers signed Williams to a one-year, $900,000 contract that included an initial signing bonus of $375,000. He entered training camp slated to return as the third cornerback on the Packers' depth chart ahead of Will Blackmon, Jarrett Bush, and Josh Bell. He began the 2009 NFL season as the third cornerback on the depth chart, behind cemented starters Charles Woodson and Al Harris.

On September 13, 2009, he appeared in the Green Bay Packers' season–opener against the Chicago Bears and made two solo tackles, a season-high three pass deflections, and had a season–high 67–yard return after intercepting a pass by Jay Cutler to wide receiver Johnny Knox during their 21–15 victory. Williams became the starter prior to Week 8 after Al Harris tore his ACL the previous game. In Week 13, he made five solo tackles and intercepted a pass by Joe Flacco but was also responsible for three pass interference penalties in a 27–14 victory over the Baltimore Ravens. The 106 penalty yards was the most assessed against any player in a game since 2000. In Week 14, Williams recorded six solo tackles and made his first career sack for an eight–yard loss on Jay Cutler during a 21–14 victory at the Chicago Bears. On January 3, 2010, Williams recorded a season-high eight combined tackles (six solo), two pass deflections, and intercepted a pass by Matt Leinart during a 33–7 win at the Arizona Cardinals in Week 17. He finished the season with 55 combined tackles (46 solo), 15 pass deflections, four interceptions, and a sack in 16 games and ten starts.

The Green Bay Packers finished second in their division with an 11–5 record. On January 10, 2010, Williams started his first career playoff game and made eight combined tackles (six solo) during a 51–45 loss at the Arizona Cardinals in the NFC Wildcard Game.

==== 2010 ====
On June 16, 2010, the Green Bay Packers signed Williams to a one–year, $3.04 million restricted free agent tender. He entered training camp slated as a starting cornerback as Al Harris was still recovering from his injury and was placed on the PUP list for the first six games before being released midseason. Head coach Mike McCarthy named Williams and Charles Woodson the starting cornerbacks to start the season. Special teams coordinator Shawn Slocum also named him the second punt returner on the depth chart behind Will Blackmon.

On September 12, 2010, Williams started in the Green Bay Packers' season–opener at the Philadelphia Eagles and made three solo tackles and a season–high three pass deflections during a 27–20 victory. In Week 3, Williams recorded a season–high seven solo tackles and a sack in a 20–17 loss at the Chicago Bears. On October 10, 2010, he made one solo tackle, two pass deflections, and intercepted a desperation hail mary pass by Donovan McNabb to wide receiver Anthony Armstrong in the closing seconds in the fourth quarter against the Washington Redskins. They went into overtime and lost 16–13. On October 17, 2010, he collected a season-high eight combined tackles (seven solo), broke up a pass, and made an interception during a 23–20 loss to the Miami Dolphins in Week 6. On November 30, 2010, the Green Bay Packers signed Williams to a four–year, $33.07 million contract extension that included $10.89 million guaranteed upon signing and an initial signing bonus of $10.00 million. On December 26, 2010, he made two combined tackles (one solo), two pass deflections, and had set a career-high with his sixth interception of the season on a pass by Eli Manning to Hakeem Nicks during a 45–17 win against the New York Giants. He started all 16 games for the first time in his career and recorded 57 combined tackles (50 solo), 20 pass deflections, and a career-high six interceptions.

The Green Bay Packers finished the 2010 NFL season second in the NFC North with a 10–6 record, clinching a wildcard position. On January 9, 2011, he started in the NFC Wildcard Game and made four solo tackles, a pass deflection, and intercepted a last second hail mary pass by Michael Vick to wide receiver Riley Cooper to seal a 21–16 victory at the Philadelphia Eagles in the NFC Wildcard Game. On January 16, 2011, Williams made a solo tackle, two pass deflections, intercepted two passes by Matt Ryan, and returned one for a touchdown during a 49–21 victory at the Atlanta Falcons in the NFC Divisional Round. Williams scored his touchdown after intercepting a pass by Matt Ryan to wide receiver Roddy White in the closing seconds of the second quarter and returned it 70–yards for a touchdown. On January 20, 2011, Williams was added to the 2011 Pro Bowl roster as a reserve in place of Philadelphia Eagles cornerback Asante Samuel, who pulled out due to an injury. The Green Bay Packers defeated the Chicago Bears 21–14 in the NFC Championship. On February 6, 2011, Williams started in Super Bowl XLV and made six combined tackles (three solo) and broke up a pass as the Green Bay Packers defeated the Pittsburgh Steelers 31–25 to win the Super Bowl. This earned Williams his first career Super Bowl ring.

==== 2011 ====
He returned as a starting cornerback, alongside Charles Woodson in 2011. On September 8, 2011, he started in the Green Bay Packers' home opener against the New Orleans Saints and made three solo tackles before exiting in the third quarter of a 42–34 victory after injuring his shoulder. He subsequently missed the Packers' Week 2 victory at the Carolina Panthers due to the injury. On November 6, 2011, Williams collected six combined tackles (five solo), made two pass deflections, and intercepted a pass by Philip Rivers to wide receiver Patrick Crayton and returned it 43 yards to score a touchdown during a 45–38 win at the San Diego Chargers in Week 9. The following week, he had two pass deflections and intercepted a pass thrown by Christian Ponder during a 45–7 victory at the Minnesota Vikings in Week 10. In Week 11, Williams recorded a season-high nine combined tackles (seven solo), broke up two passes, and had a season–high two interceptions on pass attempts thrown by Josh Freeman in the Packers' 35–26 victory against the Tampa Bay Buccaneers. This became Williams fourth interception in three games. On January 1, 2012, Williams tied his season-high of nine combined tackles (seven solo) and deflected two passes during a 45–41 win against the Detroit Lions in Week 17. He finished the 2011 season with 64 combined tackles (53 solo), a career-high 22 pass deflections, four interceptions, and a touchdown in 15 games and 15 starts.

==== 2012 ====
Defensive coordinator Dom Capers retained Williams as a starting cornerback, alongside Sam Shields, after Charles Woodson transitioned to be the starting free safety. On September 13, 2012, Williams made four solo tackles, two pass deflections, and intercepted two pass attempts by quarterback Jay Cutler as the Packers defeated the Chicago Bears 23–10 in Week 2. In Week 5, he made a season-high four pass deflections and also recorded seven solo tackles during a 30–27 loss at the Indianapolis Colts. The following week, Williams collected a season-high eight combined tackles (seven solo) and had one pass deflection during a 42–24 win at the Houston Texans in Week 6. He completed the 2012 season with 61 combined tackles (52 solo), 16 pass deflections, and two interceptions in 16 games and 16 starts.

==== 2013 ====
He began training camp slated as the No. 1 starting cornerback, and saw competition for his spot from Sam Shields, Casey Hayward, Davon House, Micah Hyde, and Jarrett Bush. Head coach Mike McCarthy chose Williams and Sam Shields as the starting cornerbacks to kick off the regular season. On November 10, 2013, Williams made seven combined tackles (six solo), had a forced fumble, a fumble recovery, and was credited with half a sack during a 27–13 loss to the Philadelphia Eagles. In Week 11, Williams made a season-high eight solo tackles, a pass deflection, and picked off a pass thrown by Eli Manning to wide receiver Louis Murphy during a 27–13 loss at the New York Giants. On December 15, 2013, he collected a season-high nine combined tackles (eight solo), made two pass deflections, and sealed the Packers' 37–36 victory at the Dallas Cowboys with a last second desperation hail mary pass thrown by Tony Romo to wide receiver Cole Beasley at the end of the fourth quarter. He started all 16 games in 2013 and finished with a career-high 83 combined tackles (61 solo), 11 pass deflections, three interceptions, and also set a new career high with 2.5 sacks.

The Green Bay Packers finished the 2013 NFL season first in the NFC North with an 8–7–1 record, clinching a playoff berth. On January 5, 2014, Williams started in the NFC Wildcard Game against the San Francisco 49ers and made two solo tackles, three pass deflections, and intercepted a pass attempt thrown by Colin Kaepernick to tight end Vernon Davis as the Packers lost, 23–20, and were subsequently eliminated from the playoffs.

==== 2014 ====
Williams and Sam Shields returned as the Green Bay Packers' starting cornerback duo for the third consecutive season. On September 14, 2014, Williams made six combined tackles (five solo), a season-high two pass deflections, and intercepted a pass by Geno Smith to tight end Zach Sudfeld during a 31–24 victory against the New York Jets in Week 2. In Week 13, Williams collected a season-high nine combined tackles (eight solo) in the Packers' 26–21 win against the New England Patriots. On December 14, 2014, Williams had two solo tackles, a pass deflection, and intercepted a pass by Kyle Orton to Sammy Watkins as the Packers lost, 21–13, at the Buffalo Bills. Williams completed the 2014 season with 70 combined tackles (60 solo), 13 pass deflections, and three interceptions in 16 games and 16 starts. Pro Football Focus gave Williams the 34th highest overall grade among the 108 qualifying cornerbacks in 2014.

=== Cleveland Browns ===
He entered free agency after the 2014 NFL season as an unrestricted free agent and reportedly received much interest from teams, that included the likes of the Baltimore Ravens, Green Bay Packers, Philadelphia Eagles, Cleveland Browns, and New Orleans Saints. It was reported that the Green Bay Packers allegedly offered Williams a two–year, $8 million contract.

==== 2015 ====
On March 16, 2015, the Cleveland Browns signed Williams to a three–year, $21.00 million contract that includes $10.00 million guaranteed and an initial signing bonus of $1.50 million.

He training camp slated as the No. 2 cornerback, but received competition for the role from 2014 first–round pick Justin Gilbert. Head coach Mike Pettine officially listed Williams the No. 2 starting cornerback to begin the regular season, opposite de facto No. 1 cornerback Joe Haden.

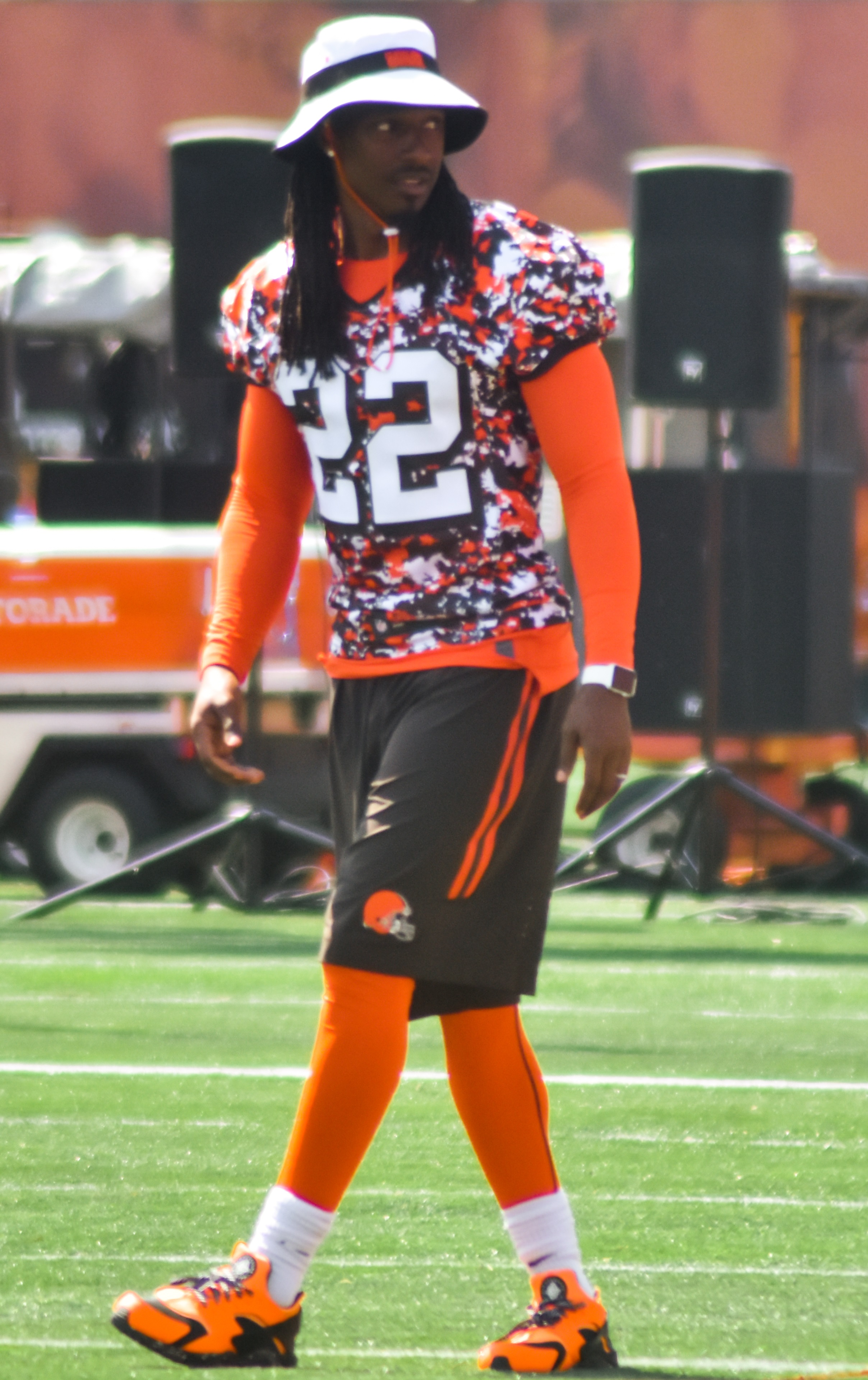
Williams with the Browns in 2015.

On November 1, 2015, Williams recorded a season-high nine combined tackles (six solo) and a pass deflection during a 34–20 loss to the Arizona Cardinals in Week 8. In Week 12, he made four combined tackles (three solo), broke up a pass, and intercepted a pass by Matt Schaub to wide receiver Kamar Aiken during a 33–27 loss to the Baltimore Ravens. He missed the Browns' Week 17 loss to the Pittsburgh Steelers after sustaining a concussion the previous week. He completed the 2015 season with 69 combined tackles (55 solo), ten pass deflections, and an interception in 15 games and 15 starts. Pro Football Focus ranked him 54th in overall grades amongst qualifying cornerbacks in 2015.

==== 2016 ====
On January 4, 2016, the Cleveland Browns fired head coach Mike Pettine and general manager Ray Farmer after they finished with a 3–13 record. Throughout training camp, Williams competed to retain the job as a starting cornerback against Jamar Taylor. Head coach Hue Jackson named Williams the third cornerback on the depth chart to start the regular season, behind Joe Haden and Jamar Taylor, and the first-team nickelback. It marked the first time he was relegated being a backup in seven seasons.

On September 18, 2016, Williams recorded a season-high seven combined tackles (five solo) and recovered a fumble during a 25–20 loss to the Baltimore Ravens in Week 2. He was sidelined for two games (Weeks 4–5) after injuring his shoulder in Week 3. On October 16, 2016, he made four combined tackles (two solo), a pass deflection, and intercepted a pass thrown by Marcus Mariota during a 28–26 loss at the Tennessee Titans in Week 6. Williams was inactive for another two games (Weeks 11–12) due to a knee injury. He completed the season with 36 combined tackles (28 solo), five pass deflections, and an interception in 12 games and seven starts. He earned the 96th highest overall grade among qualifying cornerbacks from Pro Football Focus in 2016.

==== 2017 ====
On February 7, 2017, the Browns released Williams.

=== Arizona Cardinals ===
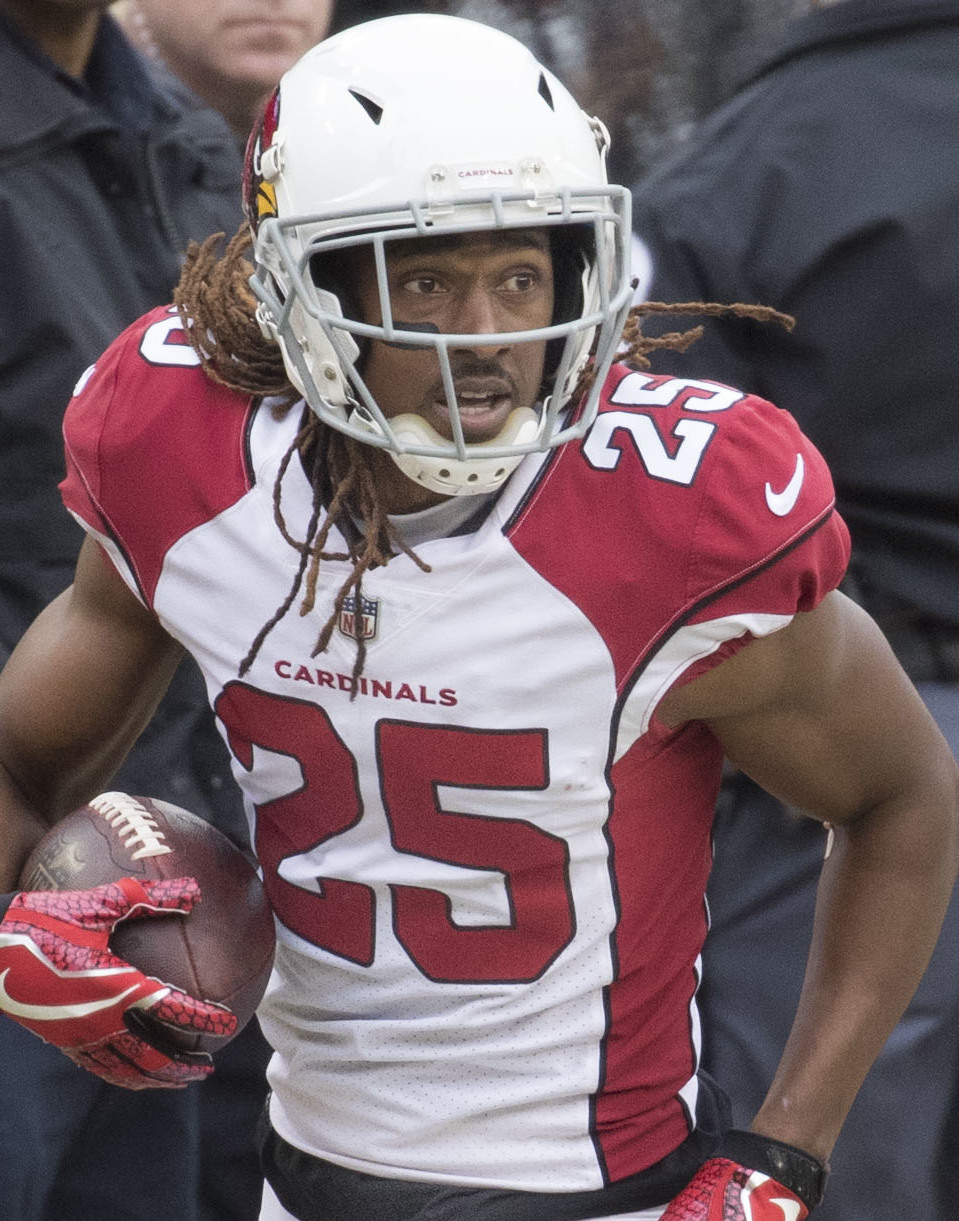
Williams in 2017

On July 30, 2017, the Arizona Cardinals signed Williams to a one-year, $2 million contract that included $750,000 guaranteed and an initial signing bonus of $500,000.

Throughout training camp, he competed for a job as a starting cornerback against Justin Bethel and Brandon Williams. Head coach Bruce Arians named him the third cornerback on the depth chart to start the 2017 regular season, behind Patrick Peterson and Justin Bethel.

Williams was inactive as a healthy scratch for three consecutive games (Weeks 3–5). In Week 6, Williams made one solo tackle and intercepted a pass by Ryan Fitzpatrick to wide receiver Mike Evans during a 38–33 win over the Tampa Bay Buccaneers. The following week, defensive coordinator James Bettcher named Williams the No. 2 starting cornerback for the rest of the season beginning in Week 7 after he surpassed Justin Bethel on the depth chart. He recorded a career-high ten solo tackles as the Cardinals lost 33–0 to the Los Angeles Rams in Week 7. On December 10, 2017, he made a season-high three pass deflections, two solo tackles, and intercepted a pass by Marcus Mariota during a 12–7 win at the Tennessee Titans. He finished his only season with the Arizona Cardinals with 41 combined tackles (39 solo), 12 pass deflections, and two interceptions in 13 games and nine starts. Pro Football Focus gave Williams an overall grade of 88.8, which ranked ninth among all qualifying cornerbacks in 2017.

=== Green Bay Packers (second stint) ===
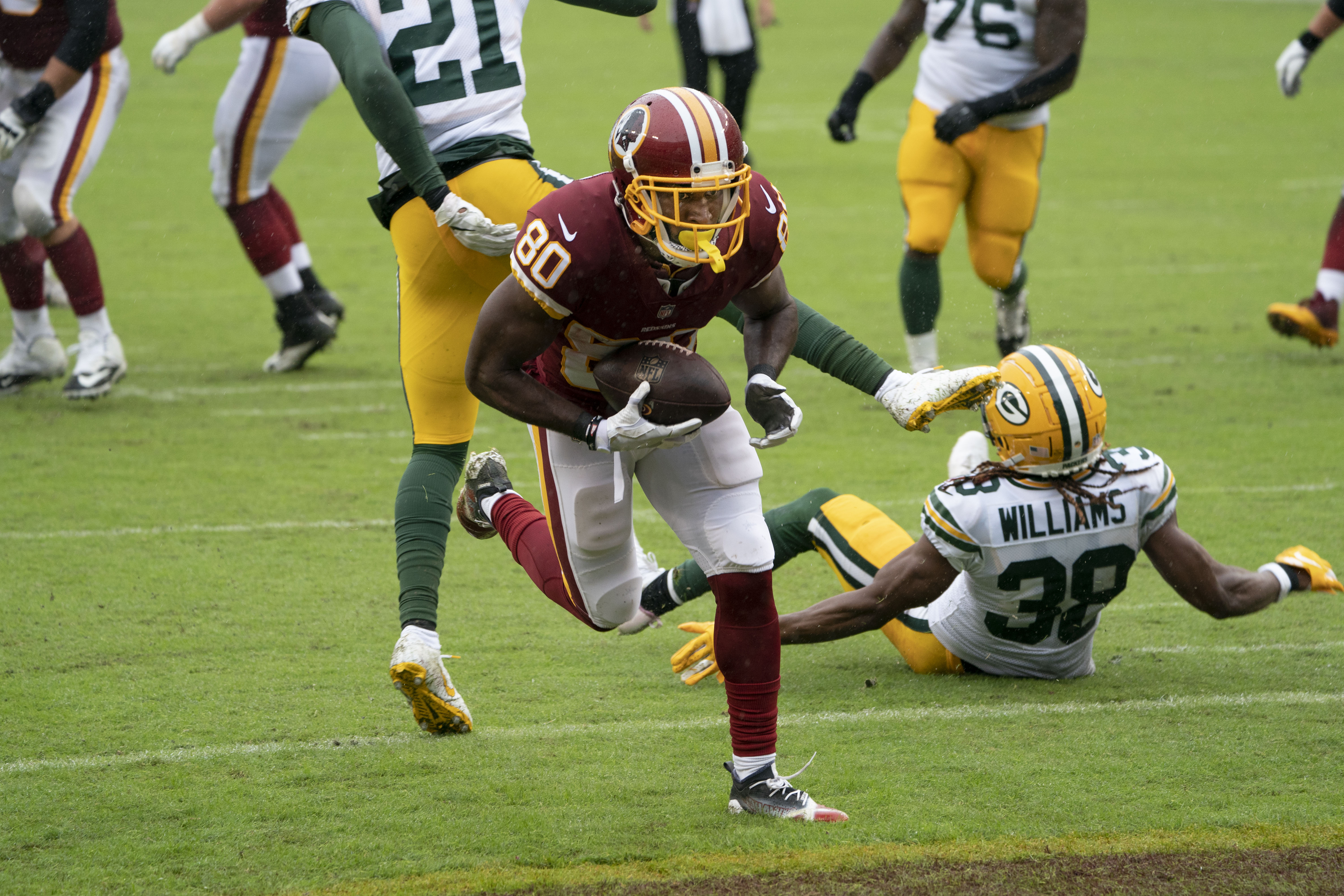
Williams in a game against the Washington Redskins in 2018

==== 2018 ====
On March 22, 2018, the Green Bay Packers signed Williams to a two–year, $10.00 million contract that includes $4.75 million guaranteed and an initial signing bonus of $3.25 million. He was reunited with former Cleveland Browns' head coach Mike Pettine who was the defensive coordinator for the Green Bay Packers.

Throughout training camp, he competed to be the No. 1 starting cornerback against Davon House, Jaire Alexander, Kevin King, Josh Jones, and Bashaud Breeland. Head coach Mike McCarthy named Williams the No. 1 starting cornerback to begin the season, alongside Davon House.

In Week 9, Williams was switched to starting free safety after the Green Bay Packers traded Ha Ha Clinton-Dix to the Washington Redskins. On November 15, 2018, he made a season-high seven combined tackles (five solo) and recovered a fumble during a 27–24 loss at the Seattle Seahawks. On December 2, 2018, the Green Bay Packers fired head coach Mike McCarthy after falling to 4–7–1 and named offensive coordinator Joe Philbin the interim head coach for the last four games of the season. He started seven games, and totaled 39 tackles, one tackle for a loss, one quarterback hit, two interceptions, eight passes defensed, one forced fumble, and two fumble recoveries.

==== 2019 ====
During training camp, Williams competed to be a starting cornerback against Jaire Alexander and Kevin King. Head coach Matt LaFleur named Williams the third cornerback on the depth chart to begin the season and starting nickelback behind Alexander and King.

On December 1, 2019, Williams made four combined tackles (two solo), one pass deflection, and intercepted a pass by Daniel Jones to wide receiver Darius Slayton during a 31–13 win at the New York Giants. In Week 15, he collected a season-high five solo tackles and broke up a pass during a 21–13 win against the Chicago Bears. He finished the season with 39 combined tackles (29 solo), eight pass deflections, and two interceptions in 16 games and seven starts.

=== Baltimore Ravens ===
On November 10, 2020, the Baltimore Ravens signed Williams due to recurring cornerback injuries on the team. Head coach John Harbaugh listed Williams as the fourth cornerback on the depth chart, behind Marlon Humphrey, Jimmy Smith, and Marcus Peters. On December 2, 2020, he made a season-high five combined tackles (three solo) during a 14–19 loss at the Pittsburgh Steelers. He was inactive for two consecutive games (Weeks 13–14). He finished the 2020 NFL season with a total of 14 combined tackles (ten solo) and one pass deflection in six games and zero starts. On January 18, 2021, the Baltimore Ravens officially waived Williams.

=== Green Bay Packers (third stint) ===
On January 21, 2021, the Green Bay Packers signed Williams to their practice squad. He was elevated to the active roster on January 23 for the NFC Championship Game against the Tampa Bay Buccaneers, and reverted to the practice squad after the game. Williams did not play in the NFC Championship. His practice squad contract with the team expired after the season on February 1, 2021.

On March 16, 2021, Williams officially announced his retirement on his 38th birthday.

== Personal life ==
Williams is married to Shantrell Moore and has two children, Tramon Jr. (T2) and Trinity.

== NFL career statistics ==
Legend
	Won the Super Bowl
**Bold**	Career high

=== Regular season ===
Year	Team	Games		Tackles				Interceptions						Fumbles	
Year	Team	GP	GS	Cmb	Solo	Ast	Sck	Int	Yds	Avg	Lng	TD	PD	FF	FR
2007	GB	**16**	1	14	13	1	0.0	1	22	22.0	22	0	4	0	0
2008	GB	**16**	9	51	46	5	0.0	5	78	15.6	39	0	14	**2**	1
2009	GB	**16**	10	50	41	9	1.0	4	**94**	**23.5**	**67**	0	15	0	0
2010	GB	**16**	**16**	52	45	7	1.0	**6**	87	14.5	64	0	20	1	**3**
2011	GB	15	15	62	51	11	0.0	4	92	23.0	43T	**1**	**22**	0	1
2012	GB	**16**	**16**	59	50	9	0.0	2	38	19.0	38	0	16	0	0
2013	GB	**16**	**16**	**77**	**55**	**22**	**2.5**	3	10	3.3	10	0	11	**2**	2
2014	GB	**16**	**16**	65	**55**	10	0.0	3	2	0.7	2	0	13	0	1
2015	CLE	15	15	68	54	14	0.0	1	2	2.0	2	0	10	0	0
2016	CLE	12	7	36	28	8	0.0	1	0	0.0	0	0	5	0	1
2017	ARI	13	9	41	39	2	0.0	2	12	6.0	12	0	12	0	1
2018	GB	**16**	**16**	52	38	14	0.0	0	0	0.0	0	0	2	0	1
2019	GB	**16**	7	36	26	10	0.0	2	−4	−2.0	0	0	8	1	2
2020	BAL	6	0	14	10	4	0.0	0	0	0.0	0	0	1	0	0
Total		205	153	667	551	126	4.5	34	433	12.7	67	1	153	6	13
Source: NFL.com

=== Postseason ===
Year	Team	Games		Tackles				Interceptions						Fumbles	
Year	Team	GP	GS	Cmb	Solo	Ast	Sck	Int	Yds	Avg	Lng	TD	PD	FF	FR
2007	GB	2	0	6	6	0	0.0	0	0	0.0	0	0	2	0	1
2009	GB	1	1	8	6	2	0.0	0	0	0.0	0	0	2	0	0
2010	GB	**4**	**4**	11	8	**3**	0.0	**3**	**79**	**26.3**	**70**	**1**	**4**	0	**2**
2011	GB	1	1	7	5	2	0.0	0	0	0.0	0	0	0	0	0
2012	GB	2	2	**12**	**12**	0	0.0	0	0	0.0	0	0	**4**	0	0
2013	GB	1	1	2	2	0	0.0	1	17	17.0	17	0	3	0	0
2014	GB	2	2	6	4	2	0.0	0	0	0.0	0	0	1	0	0
2019	GB	2	0	2	1	1	0.0	0	0	0.0	0	0	0	0	0
2020	BAL	1	0	3	2	1	0.0	0	0	0.0	0	0	0	0	0
Total		16	11	57	46	11	0.0	4	96	24.0	70	1	16	0	3
Source: pro-football-reference.com
