= Sam Shields =

American football player (born 1987)

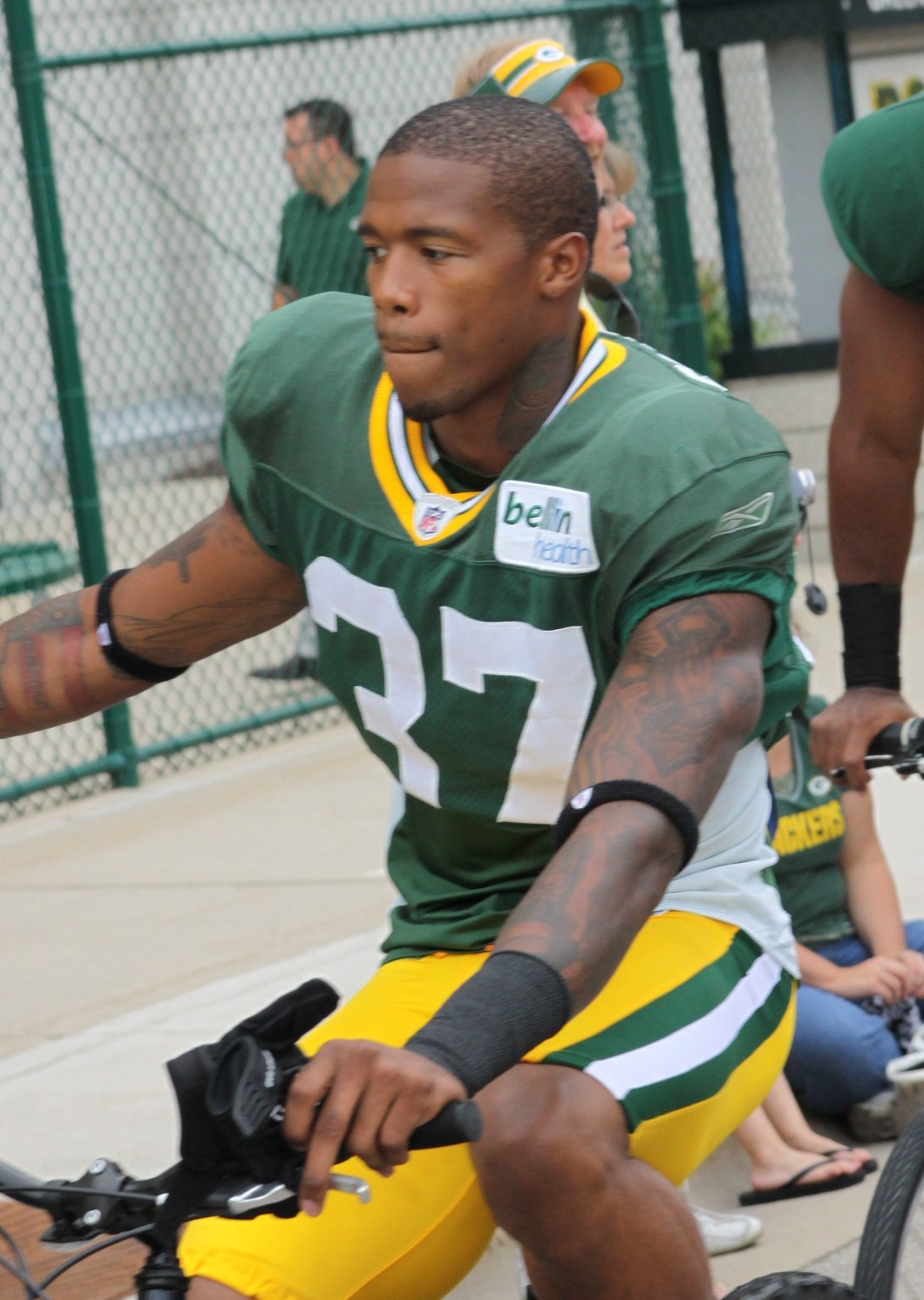
- Shields with the Green Bay Packers in 2011

No. 37
- Position: Cornerback

Personal information
- Born: December 8, 1987 (age 38); Sarasota, Florida, U.S.
- Listed height: 5 ft 11 in (1.80 m)
- Listed weight: 178 lb (81 kg)

Career information
- High school: Booker (Sarasota)
- College: Miami (FL) (2006–2009)
- NFL draft: 2010: undrafted

Career history
- Green Bay Packers (2010–2016); Los Angeles Rams (2018)

Awards and highlights
- Super Bowl champion (XLV); Pro Bowl (2014)

Career NFL statistics
- Total tackles: 265
- Sacks: 1.0
- Pass deflections: 70
- Interceptions: 19
- Forced fumbles: 1
- Stats at Pro Football Reference

Samuel George Shields III (born December 8, 1987) is an American former professional football player who was a cornerback in the National Football League (NFL). He played college football for the Miami Hurricanes. Shields was signed by the Green Bay Packers as an undrafted free agent in 2010. He won Super Bowl XLV with the team over the Pittsburgh Steelers.

== Early life ==
A native of Sarasota, Florida, Shields attended Booker High School, where he played football, baseball and ran track. In football, he played wide receiver. During his senior year, Shields had 67 receptions for 1,201 yards and 22 touchdowns. His performance helped his team make it to the Class 3A Championship game. Shields was ranked the 17th best wide receiver coming out of high school by Rivals.com. He received athletic scholarship offers from the University of Miami, Louisville, Louisiana State and Pittsburgh.

Shields also lettered twice in track and field while at Sarasota, where he was one of the state's top sprinters. He recorded a personal-best time of 10.47 seconds in the 100-meter dash, and also ran a leg on the Sarasota 4 × 100 meters relay squad that captured the state title with a time of 41.77 seconds.

== College career ==
Shields ultimately decided to play for the University of Miami, where he started seven games in his freshman year. He recorded 37 receptions, the most by a Miami true freshman since Reggie Wayne in 1997. During his first start against Louisville, he caught three passes for 63 yards including a reception for 49 yards. His first touchdown reception came on a trick play where he caught a 37-yard pass from safety Lovon Ponder versus North Carolina. Shields also scored two touchdowns in a game against Duke. Miami earned a bowl bid to the MPC Computers Bowl against Nevada. In the game, Shields had four catches for 101 yards and caught a 78-yard touchdown pass to win the game. His performance earned him a spot as an honorable mention All-American on the freshman team by Sporting News. He was also named a selection to the 2006 Atlantic Coast Conference Academic Football Team.

During his sophomore season, Shields started five of the ten games that he participated in. On September 20, 2007, in a game against Texas A&M, Shields recorded a career-high 117 yards off six receptions. He finished the season with 27 receptions for 346 yards and three touchdowns.

Shields saw an increase in playing time and played in all 13 games during his junior year either as a receiver or on special teams. He had a season-high three catches for 32 yards against Virginia. He was also voted Miami's Special Teams Player of the Year.

During his final season with the Hurricanes, Shields switched positions from wide receiver to cornerback. During a game against Georgia Tech, he made six tackles. In a match-up between Wake Forest, Shields posted a career-high seven tackles as well as a forced fumble and recovery. He received the Nick Chickillo Most Improved Player award on defense at Miami's awards banquet.

== Professional career ==
Shields was projected to be a seventh round pick by the majority of NFL draft experts and scouts. He was ranked as the 28th best cornerback prospect in the draft by DraftScout.com.

Pre-draft measurables
Height	Weight	40-yard dash	10-yard split	20-yard split	20-yard shuttle	Three-cone drill	Vertical jump	Broad jump	Bench press
5 ft 10 3/4 in (1.80 m)	184 lb (83 kg)	4.30 s	1.56 s	2.48 s	4.19 s	6.79 s	39.0 in (0.99 m)	11 ft 1 in (3.38 m)	15 reps
All values from Miami's Pro Day

=== Green Bay Packers ===
Shields went undrafted in the 2010 NFL draft, but received contract offers from seven teams.

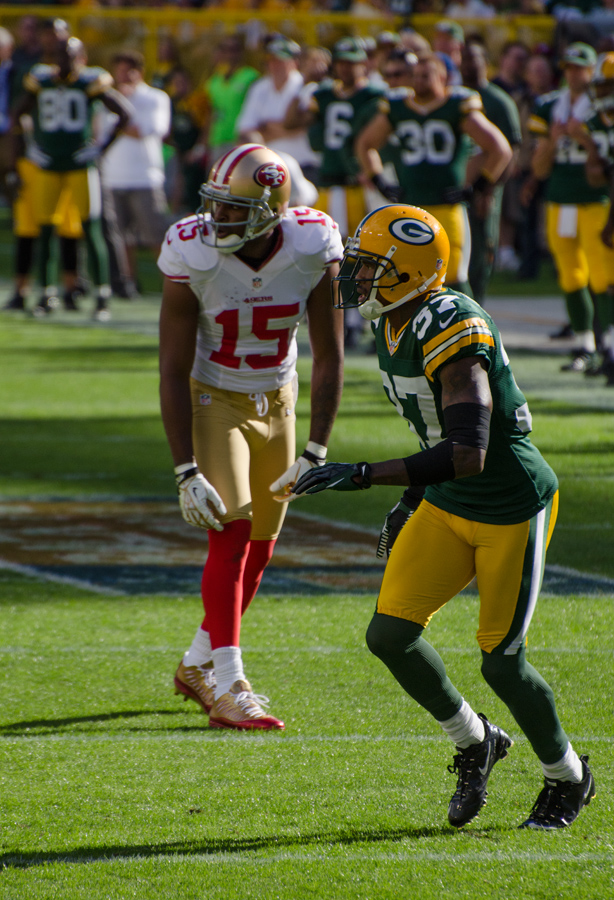
Shields guarding Michael Crabtree in a game against the San Francisco 49ers, 2012

==== 2010 ====
On April 26, 2010, the Green Bay Packers signed Shields, as an undrafted free agent, to a three–year, $1.22 million contract that includes an initial signing bonus of $7,500. The contract was for the rookie minimum for undrafted free agents

Throughout training camp, Shields competed to be the nickelback or dime back against Brandon Underwood and Pat Lee. Head coach Mike McCarthy named Shields the third cornerback on the depth chart to start the regular season, behind Charles Woodson and Tramon Williams.

On September 12, 2010, Shields earned his first career start and made his professional regular season debut in the Green Bay Packers' season-opener at the Philadelphia Eagles and recorded three combined tackles in their 27–20 victory. Shields and safety Morgan Burnett became the first rookie defensive back tandem to start for the Packers since the AFL and NFL merged. He was inactive for two games (Weeks 4–5) due to a calf injury. On November 11, 2010, Shields recorded a season-high two pass deflections, a solo tackle, and made his first career interception off a pass thrown by Jon Kitna to wide receiver Miles Austin during a 45–7 victory against the Dallas Cowboys. On December 12, 2010, Shields collected a season-high six solo tackles in the Packers' 7–3 loss at the Detroit Lions. On December 26, 2010, he made four combined tackles (three solo), one pass deflection, and intercepted a pass by Eli Manning as the Packers routed the New York Giants 45–17. He completed his rookie season in 2010 with 29 tackles (25 solo), six passes defensed, and two interceptions in 14 games and six starts. He also served as a kick returner and had 21 kick returns for 452-yards (21.5 YPR).

The Green Bay Packers finished second in the NFC North with a 10–6 record and earned a wildcard berth. On January 9, 2011, Shields started in his first career playoff game and recorded four solo tackles and a pass deflection during a 21–16 victory at the Philadelphia Eagles in the NFC Wildcard Game. The Packers then defeated the Atlanta Falcons in the NFC Divisional Round. On January 23, 2011, Shields started in the 2010 NFC Championship Game and recorded four solo tackles, deflected two passes, made two interceptions, had a sack, and forced a fumble during a 21–14 win at the Chicago Bears. He intercepted a pass by quarterback Caleb Hanie, that was intended for wide receiver Johnny Knox, with less than 47 seconds left to seal the Packers' victory and send them to Super Bowl XLV. On February 6, 2011, Shields collected two solo tackles in the Packers' 31–25 victory against the Pittsburgh Steelers in win Super Bowl XLV. Shields injured his shoulder in the second quarter and had difficulty covering receivers due to his limited mobility.

==== 2011 ====
Defensive coordinator Dom Capers retained Shields as the third cornerback on the depth chart, behind Charles Woodson and Tramon Williams, to begin the regular season.

On September 8, 2011, he started in the Green Bay Packers' season-opener against the New Orleans Saints and collected a season-high eight combined tackles (seven solo) and two pass deflections in their 42–34 victory. In Week 4, he collected five combined tackles (four solo), a pass deflection, and intercepted a pass by Kyle Orton] and returned it for a 60–yard gain during a 49–24 victory against the Denver Broncos. On October 16, 2011, he recorded five solo tackles, broke up a pass, and made an interception before exiting the Packers' 24–3 victory over the St. Louis Rams in the third quarter due to a concussion. Shields intercepted a jump ball thrown by Sam Bradford, that was originally intended for wide receiver Danario Alexander in the endzone, and was blindsided by wide receiver Brandon Gibson during the return. The hit by Gibson made direct impact with Shields' helmet and caused a concussion that sidelined him for the Packers' Week 7 victory at the Minnesota Vikings. The concussion reportedly caused him dizziness and headaches for multiple days. On December 11, 2011, he made one tackle, a season-high two pass deflections, and an interception in the Packers' 46–16 win against the Oakland Raiders in Week 14. Shields finished the season with 45 combined tackles (42 solo), 12 pass deflections, four interceptions, and a forced fumble in 15 games and seven starts.

==== 2012 ====
During the off-season former starting safety Nick Collins departed during free agency. Defensive coordinator Dom Capers chose to have Charles Woodson transition from the No. 1 starting cornerback to starting free safety. Throughout training camp, Shields competed to be a starting cornerback against Davon House, Jarrett Bush, Tramon Williams, and rookie Casey Hayward. Shields became the third cornerback on the depth chart to begin the season after Davon House injured his shoulder duting the preseason and was inactive for the first six regular season games. With his absence, head coach Mike McCarthy elected to name Tramon Williams and Jarrett Bush the starting cornerbacks in Week 1.

In Week 2, Shields supplanted Jarrett Bush as a starting cornerback and started alongside Tramon Williams. In Week 4, head coach Mike McCarthy decided to move starting free safety Charles Woodson back to starting cornerback, replacing Shields for the rest of the season. On September 24, 2012, Shields recorded two combined tackles and a pass deflection in the Green Bay Packers 14–12 loss at the Seattle Seahawks in Week 3. During the closing seconds of the fourth quarter, Shields was shoved to the ground by Seahawks' wide receiver Golden Tate while he was covering him during a last ditch hail mary by Seattle. The pass was simultaneously caught by Golden Tate and Packers' safety M. D. Jennings and immediately ruled as a touchdown by one official while his colleague signaled it was an interception. After a review by officials, it was ruled as a touchdown reception by head official Wayne Elliot, giving the Seattle Seahawks a 14–12 victory. The play was highly controversial and the NFL would later release an official statement acknowledging the shove by Tate that should've been called for offensive pass interference. It was dubbed the "Inaccurate Reception" and "Fail Mary" while highlighting the problems surrounding the NFL's choice to hire replacement officials during the NFL's officials strike. In Week 5, Shields collected a season-high five solo tackles and broke up a pass during a 30–27 loss at the Indianapolis Colts. Shields was inactive for six games (Weeks 7–13) after suffering a high ankle sprain during a Week 6 win at the Houston Texans. On December 23, 2012, he made one tackle, two pass deflections, an interception, and had his first career sack, dropping Titans' quarterback Jake Locker for an eight-yard loss in the fourth quarter during a 55–7 victory against the Tennessee Titans in Week 16 He finished the 2012 season with a total of 28 combined tackles (23 solo), ten passes defensed, three interceptions, and one sack in ten games and eight starts.

The Green Bay Packers finished first in the NFC North with an 11–5 record and earned playoff berth. On January 6, 2013, Shields recorded seven combined tackles (five solo), deflected two passes, and intercepted a pass attempt by Joe Webb during a 24–10 victory against the Minnesota Vikings in the NFC Wildcard Game. On January 12, 2013, he made four solo tackles, two pass deflections, two interceptions, and returned an interception by Colin Kaepernick on the 49ers' opening drive 52–yards for his first career touchdown during a 45–31 loss at the San Francisco 49ers in the NFC Divisional Round. .

==== 2013 ====
On March 12, 2013, the Green Bay Packers signed Shields to a one–year, $2.02 million contract. Defensive coordinator Dom Capers and cornerbacks coach Joe Whitt Jr. held an open competition between Davon House, Tramon Williams, and Casey Hayward. Head coach Mike McCarthy named Shields and Tramon Williams as the starting cornerbacks to kick off the season.

He started in the Green Bay Packers' season-opener at the San Francisco 49ers and collected a season-high nine combined tackles (seven solo) and two pass deflections in their 34–28 loss. He was sidelined for two games (Weeks 11–12) after suffering a hamstring injury. On December 15, 2013, Shields made five solo tackles, a season-high three pass deflections, and intercepted a pass thrown by Tony Romo to wide receiver Miles Austin. He completed the 2013 season with a career-high 61 combined tackles (51 solo), a career-high 14 pass deflections, and four interceptions in 14 games and 14 starts.

==== 2014 ====
On March 8, 2014, the Green Bay Packers signed Shields to a four–year, $39 million contract that included an initial signing bonus of $12.50 million. He entered training camp slated as a de facto starting cornerback. Head coach Mike McCarthy officially named Shields and Tramon Williams the starting cornerbacks duo to begin the 2014 regular season.

On September 28, 2014, Shields recorded three solo tackles, a season-high three pass deflections, and intercepted a pass thrown by Jay Cutler in the Packers' 38–17 win at the Chicago Bears in Week 4. He was inactive for two games (Weeks 7–8) after sustaining a knee injuring during a Week 6 victory at the Miami Dolphins. In Week 10, Shields collected a season-high six solo tackles and deflected a pass during a 55–14 victory against the Chicago Bears. He finished the season with 40 combined tackles (33 solo), nine passes defensed, and two interceptions in 14 games and 14 starts.

==== 2015 ====
During the off-season, Davon House and Tramon Williams both departed during free agency. The Green Bay Packers drafted cornerbacks Damarious Randall and Quinten Rollins to compete to be a starting cornerback against Sam Shields and Casey Hayward. Head coach Mike McCarthy named Shields and Casey Hayward the starting cornerbacks to begin the season. On September 28, 2015, he produced six solo tackles, a pass deflection, and intercepted a pass by Alex Smith during a 38–28 win against the Kansas City Chiefs. In Week 6, he collected a season-high eight solo tackles during a 27–20 victory against the San Diego Chargers. He was inactive during a Week 9 loss at the Carolina Panthers after injuring his shoulder. On December 13, 2015, he made one solo tackle, two pass deflections, and intercepted a pass by Matt Cassel to wide receiver Dez Bryant before exiting in the third quarter of a 28–7 win against the Dallas Cowboys due to an injury. He subsequently missed the last three games of the season (Weeks 15–17) due to a head injury. He finished the 2015 NFL season with a total of 39 combined tackles (37 solo), 13 pass deflections, and three interceptions in 12 games and 12 starts.

==== 2016 ====
Sam Shields returned as a starting cornerback alongside Damarious Randall after the departure of Casey Hayward. On September 11, 2016, Shields started in the Green Bay Packers' season-opener at the Jacksonville Jaguars and made three solo tackles before exiting in the third quarter of a 27–23 victory after suffering a concussion while making a tackle on running back T. J. Yeldon. This marked his fourth known concussion in his NFL career. On October 18, 2016, the Green Bay Packers officially placed him on injured reserve after missing four games. He remained on injured reserve for the entire 2015 NFL season and did not return to the Green Bay Packers.

==== 2017 ====
On February 8, 2017, Shields was released by the Packers after seven seasons with the team.

=== Los Angeles Rams ===
==== 2018 ====
On March 8, 2018, the Los Angeles Rams signed Shields to a one–year, $1.00 million contract after he missed the 2017 NFL season while recovering from concussions. Throughout training camp, he competed to be a backup cornerback against Troy Hill and Nickell Robey-Coleman. Head coach Sean McVay named him the third cornerback on the depth chart to begin the season, behind starters Aqib Talib and Marcus Peters.

On September 16, 2018, Shields made one solo tackle, a pass deflection, and intercepted a pass thrown by Sam Bradford to Chad Williams as the Rams routed the Arizona Cardinals 34–0. In Week 11, he collected a season-high six solo tackles during a 54–51 victory against the Kansas City Chiefs. In his first season with the Rams, Shields recorded 22 combined tackles (18 solo), four pass deflections, and one interception in 16 games and two starts. Shields mainly played on special teams throughout the season.

In the NFC Championship Game against the New Orleans Saints with the Rams down 13–0 early in the second quarter, the Rams performed a fake punt and Shields caught the ball from Johnny Hekker for 12 yards to help the Rams get their first score of the game. The Rams went on to win in overtime 26–23 to advance to Super Bowl LIII where they lost 13–3 to the New England Patriots.

== NFL career statistics ==
=== Regular season ===
Year	Team	G	GS	Tackles					Interceptions						Fumbles	
Year	Team	G	GS	Total	Solo	Ast	Sck	SFTY	PDef	Int	Yds	Avg	Lng	TDs	FF	FR
2010	GB	14	6	28	24	4	0.0	0	6	2	0	0.0	0	0	0	0
2011	GB	15	7	42	38	4	0.0	0	12	4	68	17.0	60	0	1	0
2012	GB	10	8	26	22	4	1.0	0	10	3	32	10.7	32	0	0	1
2013	GB	14	14	61	51	10	0.0	0	16	4	3	0.8	7	0	0	0
2014	GB	14	14	44	36	8	0.0	0	9	2	62	31.0	62	0	0	0
2015	GB	12	12	39	37	2	0.0	0	13	3	15	5.0	15	0	0	1
2016	GB	1	1	3	3	0	0.0	0	0	0	0	0.0	0	0	0	0
2018	LAR	16	2	22	18	4	0.0	0	4	1	22	22.0	22	0	0	0
Total		96	64	265	229	36	1.0	0	70	19	202	10.6	62	0	1	2
Source: NFL.com

=== Postseason ===
Year	Team	G	GS	Tackles					Interceptions						Fumbles	
Year	Team	G	GS	Total	Solo	Ast	Sck	SFTY	PDef	Int	Yds	Avg	Lng	TDs	FF	FR
2010	GB	4	2	13	13	0	1.0	0	3	2	40	20.0	32	0	1	0
2011	GB	1	0	1	0	1	0.0	0	1	0	0	0.0	0	0	0	0
2012	GB	2	2	11	9	2	0.0	0	4	2	52	26.0	52	1	0	0
2013	GB	1	1	0	0	0	0.0	0	0	0	0	0.0	0	0	0	0
2014	GB	2	2	4	3	1	0.0	0	2	1	0	0.0	0	0	0	0
2015	GB	1	1	3	3	0	0.0	0	2	0	0	0.0	0	0	0	0
2018	LAR	3	0	0	0	0	0.0	0	0	0	0	0.0	0	0	0	0
Total		14	8	32	28	4	1.0	0	12	5	92	18.4	52	1	1	0
Source: pro-football-reference.com

== Personal life ==
On October 19, 2016, police found marijuana after searching Shields' home. On January 16, 2017, Shields was officially charged with two counts of marijuana possession. On April 24, 2017, he pled no contest and received a $500 fine.
