= Jeremy Ross =

American football player (born 1988)

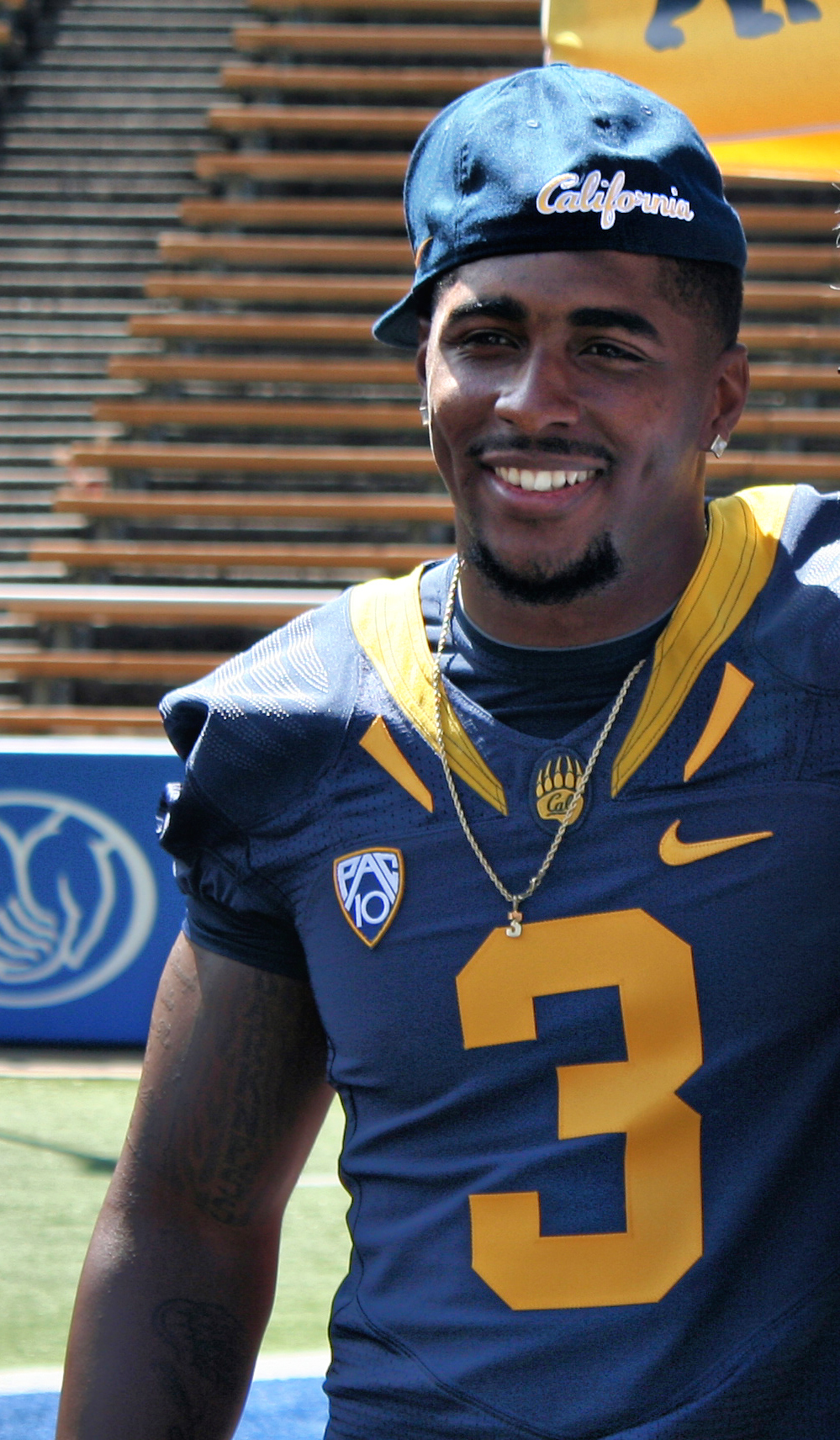
- Ross during his time at California in 2010

No. 10, 12, 13, 16
- Positions: Return specialist, wide receiver

Personal information
- Born: March 16, 1988 (age 38); Sacramento, California, U.S.
- Listed height: 6 ft 0 in (1.83 m)
- Listed weight: 215 lb (98 kg)

Career information
- High school: Laguna Creek (Elk Grove, California)
- College: California (2006–2010)
- NFL draft: 2011: undrafted

Career history
- New England Patriots (2011)*; Indianapolis Colts (2011–2012)*; Green Bay Packers (2012–2013); Detroit Lions (2013–2014); Baltimore Ravens (2015); Oakland Raiders (2015); New York Jets (2016); Arizona Cardinals (2016)
- * Offseason or practice squad member only

Career NFL statistics
- Receptions: 43
- Receiving yards: 506
- Receiving touchdowns: 3
- Return yards: 2,752
- Return touchdowns: 2
- Stats at Pro Football Reference

Jeremy Spencer Ross (born March 16, 1988) is an American former professional football player who was a wide receiver and return specialist in the National Football League (NFL). He played college football for the California Golden Bears and was signed by the New England Patriots as an undrafted free agent in 2011.

Ross was also a member of the Indianapolis Colts, Green Bay Packers, Detroit Lions, Baltimore Ravens, Oakland Raiders, New York Jets, and Arizona Cardinals.

== Professional career ==
Pre-draft measurables
Height	Weight	40-yard dash	10-yard split	20-yard split	20-yard shuttle	Three-cone drill	Vertical jump	Broad jump	Bench press
5 ft 11 7/8 in (1.83 m)	209 lb (95 kg)	4.44 s	1.50 s	2.53 s	4.19 s	7.20 s	39.0 in (0.99 m)	9 ft 7 in (2.92 m)	22 reps
All values from Pro Day

=== New England Patriots ===
Ross signed with the New England Patriots on July 25, 2011, after going unselected in the 2011 NFL draft. The Patriots released him on August 30 for final roster cuts before the start the regular season.

=== Indianapolis Colts ===
The Indianapolis Colts signed Ross to the practice squad on September 28, 2011. He was released by the Colts on August 31, 2012.

=== Green Bay Packers ===
The Green Bay Packers signed Ross to their practice squad on October 17, 2012. He was promoted to the team's active roster on December 1. He committed a crucial muff on a punt return in a playoff-game loss to the San Francisco 49ers on January 12, 2013, which resulted in a 49ers' touchdown.

Ross was released by the Packers on September 23, 2013, after committing a crucial fumble on a kickoff in the first quarter of the previous day's game, which led to a Cincinnati Bengals' touchdown. He played in eight regular-season games for the Packers over the past two seasons, averaged 17.9 yards on nine kickoff returns, 20.5 yards on six punt returns and made one catch for 8 yards.

=== Detroit Lions ===
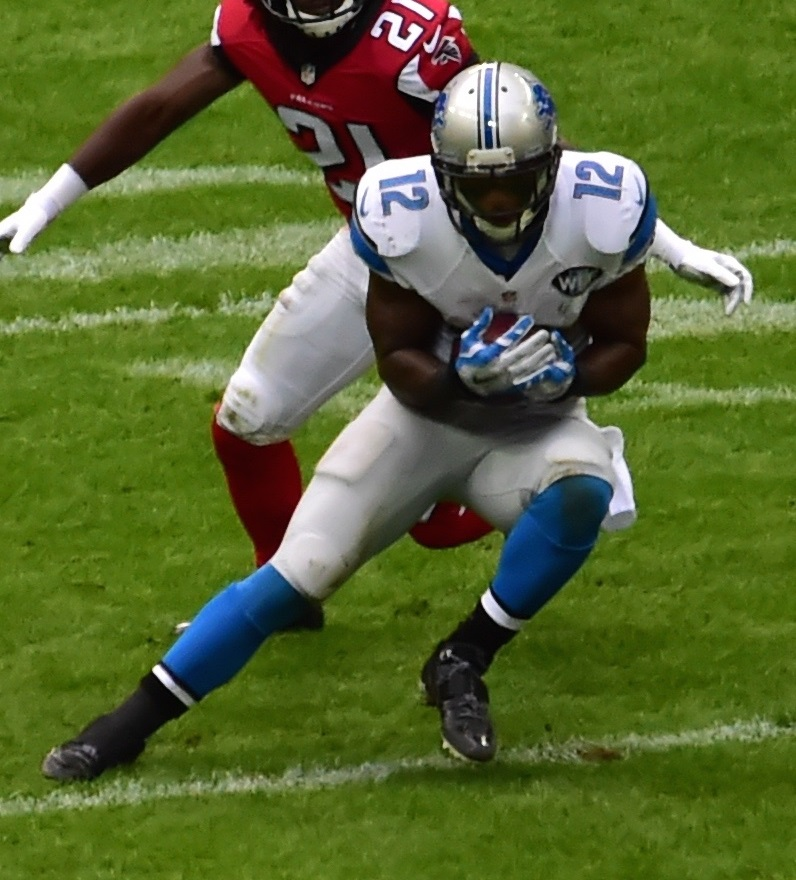
Ross with the Lions in 2014

Ross was signed to the practice squad of the Detroit Lions on October 7, 2013. He was promoted off the Lions' practice squad to the active roster on October 19, following an injury to wide receiver Nate Burleson. Since signing, he has played a role as a slot receiver and kick returner. He contributed to the Lions' 40-10 Thanksgiving Day victory over his former team, the Green Bay Packers, on November 28, 2013. In that game, he scored his first career NFL touchdown on a 5-yard pass from Matthew Stafford, and he had one run for 24 yards to pick up a first down.

Since signing off the practice squad he has recorded five receptions for 59 yards and one touchdown, one run for 24 yards, eight punt returns for 159 yards, and 10 kickoff returns for 335 yards. During a game against the Philadelphia Eagles on December 8, Ross scored touchdowns on both a punt return and a kickoff return. This made him the first Lions player to do so since Eddie Payton on December 17, 1977.

On April 20, 2015, the Lions signed Ross to an exclusive-rights free agent tender. On September 5, Ross was among final roster cuts before the start of the regular season.

=== Baltimore Ravens ===
On September 7, 2015, Ross was signed to the Baltimore Ravens' practice squad. He was promoted to the active roster on October 10. On November 17, Ross was waived by the Ravens.

=== Oakland Raiders ===
On November 19, 2015, Ross was signed to the Oakland Raiders' practice squad. On November 25, Ross was signed to the active roster.

=== New York Jets ===
Ross signed with the New York Jets on April 6, 2016. On September 3, he was released by the Jets. Ross was re-signed by New York on September 29. He was released by the Jets on October 11. Ross was re-signed by the Jets on November 22. He was released again on December 6.

=== Arizona Cardinals ===
On December 14, 2016, Ross was signed by the Arizona Cardinals. In two games with the Cardinals, Ross caught four passes for 37 yards, including one touchdown. It was his first touchdown since September 28, 2014 (over two years earlier), when Ross scored as a member of the Lions against the New York Jets.

On February 27, 2017, Ross signed a one-year contract extension with the Cardinals. He was released by the Cardinals on September 2.
