= 2013 Green Bay Packers season =

NFL team season

- Owner: Green Bay Packers, Inc. (112,158 stockholders)
- General manager: Ted Thompson
- Head coach: Mike McCarthy
- Offensive coordinator: Tom Clements
- Defensive coordinator: Dom Capers
- Home stadium: Lambeau Field

Results
- Record: 8–7–1
- Division place: 1st NFC North
- Playoffs: Lost Wild Card Playoffs (vs. 49ers) 20–23
- Pro Bowlers: Eddie Lacy, RB

Uniform
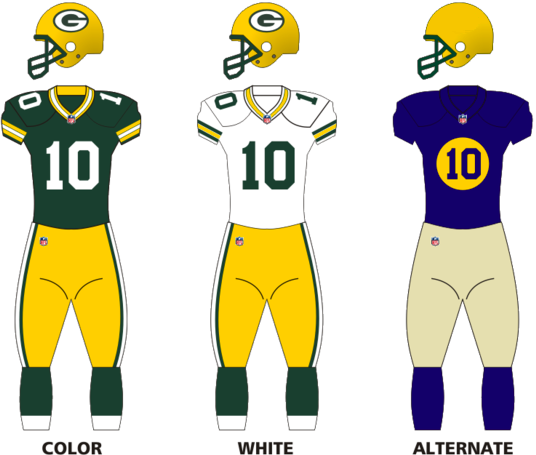

The 2013 season was the Green Bay Packers' 95th season overall, 93rd in the National Football League (NFL) and eighth under head coach Mike McCarthy. For the first time since 1998, Donald Driver was not on the opening day roster; and for the first time since 2005, Greg Jennings and Charles Woodson were not on the opening day roster either. The Packers came into the 2013 season looking to win the NFC North for the third year in a row, after a 45–31 loss to the San Francisco 49ers in the NFC Divisional Playoffs the previous season. The Packers started the 2013 season in a rematch with the San Francisco 49ers, to whom they lost 34-28. After winning their home opener against the Redskins, Green Bay lost 34–30 in Cincinnati to the Bengals after holding a 30–14 lead in the 3rd quarter. Following the loss in Cincinnati, the Packers won 4 games in a row to sit at 5–2 before losing a Monday Night game at home to the Chicago Bears, 27–20. In that game, the Packers lost star quarterback Aaron Rodgers to a broken collarbone in the 1st quarter. He would be replaced by backups Scott Tolzien and Matt Flynn during recovery. In Week 12, the Packers tied the Minnesota Vikings 26–26; it was Green Bay's first tie since 1987.

The Packers would lose their next game 40–10 to the Detroit Lions on Thanksgiving to sit at 5–6–1, threatening to miss the postseason for the first time since 2008. The Packers then rallied to beat the Atlanta Falcons 22–21 to even their record at 6–6–1. The following week, the Packers defeated the Dallas Cowboys 37–36 in Dallas after they had trailed 26–3 at halftime, the largest comeback in franchise history. The Packers would then lose a shootout with the Pittsburgh Steelers 31–38 at home to sit at 7–7–1, the first meeting between the teams since Super Bowl XLV. The following week, the Packers defeated the Chicago Bears 33–28 at Soldier Field to clinch the NFC North in a game in which the winner would clinch the division. The game is well known for a touchdown catch made by Randall Cobb from Aaron Rodgers with less than a minute remaining to seal the win. The play came on a 4th and 8 situation in which Cobb was wide open near the endzone. Finishing the regular season with an 8–7–1 record, the Packers entered the playoffs as the 4th seed in the NFC. In the wild card game, they lost 23–20 in a rematch with the 49ers on a Phil Dawson field goal as time expired. The game was one of the coldest in NFL playoff history, with a temperature of 5 °F (−15 °C).

== Offseason ==
=== Free agents ===
Position	Player	Free agency tag	Date signed	2013 team
RB	Cedric Benson	UFA		Free agent
RB	Ryan Grant	UFA		Free agent
WR	Donald Driver	UFA	January 30	Retired
WR	Greg Jennings	UFA	March 15	Minnesota Vikings
TE	Tom Crabtree	RFA	March 15	Tampa Bay Buccaneers
C	Evan Dietrich-Smith	RFA	April 12	Green Bay Packers
LB	Robert Francois	RFA	March 15	Green Bay Packers
LB	Brad Jones	UFA	March 21	Green Bay Packers
LB	Erik Walden	UFA	March 12	Indianapolis Colts
LB	Frank Zombo	RFA	April 3	Kansas City Chiefs
CB	Sam Shields	RFA	June 3	Green Bay Packers

RFA: Restricted free agent, UFA: Unrestricted free agent, ERFA: Exclusive rights free agent, FT: Franchise Tag

=== 2013 NFL draft ===
2013 Green Bay Packers draft
Round	Pick	Player	Position	College	Notes
1	26	Datone Jones	Defensive end	UCLA	
2	61	Eddie Lacy *	Running back	Alabama	from San Francisco 49ers
4	109	David Bakhtiari *	Offensive tackle	Colorado	from Miami Dolphins
4	122	J. C. Tretter	Offensive guard	Cornell	
4	125	Johnathan Franklin	Running back	UCLA	from Denver Broncos
5	159	Micah Hyde *	Cornerback	Iowa	
5	167	Josh Boyd	Defensive end	Mississippi State	compensatory selection
6	193	Nate Palmer	Linebacker	Illinois State	
7	216	Charles Johnson	Wide receiver	Grand Valley State	from San Francisco 49ers
7	224	Kevin Dorsey	Wide receiver	Maryland	from Miami Dolphins
7	232	Sam Barrington	Linebacker	South Florida	
Made roster † Pro Football Hall of Fame * Made at least one Pro Bowl during career

Notes

- The Packers traded pick No. 55 to receive No. 61 and No. 173 from the San Francisco 49ers.
- The Packers traded pick No. 88 to receive No. 93 and No. 216 from the San Francisco 49ers.
- The Packers traded pick No. 93 to receive No. 109, No. 146 and No. 224 from the Miami Dolphins.
- The Packers traded picks No. 146 and No. 173 to receive No. 125 from the Denver Broncos.
- J. C. Tretter began the season on the physically unable to perform list.
- Kevin Dorsey began the season on the injured reserve list.

== Staff ==
2013 Green Bay Packers staff
Front office: Executive committee – board of directors; President/CEO – Mark Murphy; Executive vice president/general manager/director of football operations – Ted Thompson; Vice president of football administration/player finance – Russ Ball; Director of college scouting – Brian Gutekunst; Director of pro personnel – Eliot Wolf; Assistant director of pro personnel – Tim Terry; Senior personnel executive – Alonzo Highsmith; Head coaches: Head coach – Mike McCarthy; Assistant head coach/inside linebackers – Winston Moss; Offensive coaches: Offensive coordinator – Tom Clements; Quarterbacks – Ben McAdoo; Running backs – Alex Van Pelt; Wide receivers – Edgar Bennett; Tight ends – Jerry Fontenot; Offensive line – James Campen; Assistant offensive line – Joel Hilgenberg; Offensive assistant/special teams – John Rushing	Defensive coaches: Defensive coordinator – Dom Capers; Defensive line – Mike Trgovac; Outside linebackers – Kevin Greene; Secondary (Cornerbacks) – Joe Whitt Jr.; Secondary (Safeties) – Darren Perry; Defensive quality control – Scott McCurley; Special teams coaches: Special teams coordinator – Shawn Slocum; Special teams assistant – Chad Morton; Strength and conditioning: Strength and conditioning coordinator – Mark Lovat; Strength and conditioning assistant – Thadeus Jackson; Strength and conditioning assistant – Zac Woodfin

== Final roster ==
2013 Green Bay Packers roster
Quarterbacks (QB): 12 Aaron Rodgers; 10 Matt Flynn; 16 Scott Tolzien; Running backs (RB): 22 Kahlil Bell; 30 John Kuhn FB; 27 Eddie Lacy; 44 James Starks; Wide receivers (WR): 11 Jarrett Boykin; 18 Randall Cobb; 13 Chris Harper; 89 James Jones; 87 Jordy Nelson; 10 Jeremy Ross; Tight ends (TE): 81 Andrew Quarless; 85 Jake Stoneburner; 82 Ryan Taylor	Offensive linemen (OL): 69 David Bakhtiari LT; 67 Don Barclay RT; 62 Evan Dietrich-Smith C; 70 T. J. Lang G; 74 Marshall Newhouse LT; 78 Derek Sherrod RT; 71 Josh Sitton G; 65 Lane Taylor G; 73 JC Tretter G; Defensive linemen (DL): 93 Josh Boyd DE; 76 Mike Daniels DE; 95 Datone Jones DE; 79 Ryan Pickett NT; 90 B. J. Raji NT; 98 C. J. Wilson DE; 99 Jerel Worthy DE	Linebackers (LB): 54 Victor Aiyewa ILB; 50 A. J. Hawk ILB; 59 Brad Jones ILB; 57 Jamari Lattimore ILB; 52 Clay Matthews OLB; 55 Andy Mulumba OLB; 96 Mike Neal OLB; 51 Nate Palmer OLB; 53 Nick Perry OLB; Defensive backs (DB): 32 Chris Banjo FS; 42 Morgan Burnett SS; 24 Jarrett Bush CB; 31 Davon House CB; 33 Micah Hyde CB; 43 M. D. Jennings FS; 22 Jerron McMillian CB; 28 Sean Richardson SS; 20 Jumal Rolle CB; 37 Sam Shields CB; 38 Tramon Williams CB; Special teams (ST): 2 Mason Crosby K; 61 Brett Goode LS; 8 Tim Masthay P	Practice squad: 77 Aaron Adams RT; 35 Antonio Dennard CB; 72 Garth Gerhart C; 1 Alex Gillett WR; 34 Michael Hill RB; 34 Orwin Smith RB; 68 Andrew Tiller G; 83 Tyrone Walker WR; Reserve: 58 Sam Barrington ILB (IR); 86 Brandon Bostick TE (IR); 75 Bryan Bulaga RT (IR); 13 Sederrik Cunningham WR (IR); 6 Kevin Dorsey WR (IR); 88 Jermichael Finley TE (IR); 49 Robert Francois ILB (IR); 23 Johnathan Franklin RB (IR); 26 DuJuan Harris RB (IR); 29 Casey Hayward CB (IR); 97 Johnny Jolly DE (IR); 25 James Nixon CB (IR); 64 Greg Van Roten G (IR); 9 Seneca Wallace QB (IR); 19 Myles White WR (IR); Rookies in italics 53 active, 15 reserve, 8 practice squad

== Schedule ==
=== Preseason ===
Week	Date	Opponent	Result	Record	Game site	NFL.com recap
1	August 9	Arizona Cardinals	**L** 0–17	0–1	Lambeau Field	Recap
2	August 17	at St. Louis Rams	**W** 19–7	1–1	Edward Jones Dome	Recap
3	August 23	Seattle Seahawks	**L** 10–17	1–2	Lambeau Field	Recap
4	August 29	at Kansas City Chiefs	**L** 8–30	1–3	Arrowhead Stadium	Recap

=== Regular season ===
Week	Date	Opponent	Result	Record	Game site	NFL.com recap
1	September 8	at San Francisco 49ers	**L** 28–34	0–1	Candlestick Park	Recap
2	September 15	Washington Redskins	**W** 38–20	1–1	Lambeau Field	Recap
3	September 22	at Cincinnati Bengals	**L** 30–34	1–2	Paul Brown Stadium	Recap
4	Bye					
5	October 6	**Detroit Lions**	**W** 22–9	2–2	Lambeau Field	Recap
6	October 13	at Baltimore Ravens	**W** 19–17	3–2	M&T Bank Stadium	Recap
7	October 20	Cleveland Browns	**W** 31–13	4–2	Lambeau Field	Recap
8	October 27	at **Minnesota Vikings**	**W** 44–31	5–2	Mall of America Field	Recap
9	November 4	**Chicago Bears**	**L** 20–27	5–3	Lambeau Field	Recap
10	November 10	Philadelphia Eagles	**L** 13–27	5–4	Lambeau Field	Recap
11	November 17	at New York Giants	**L** 13–27	5–5	MetLife Stadium	Recap
12	November 24	**Minnesota Vikings**	**T** 26–26 (OT)	5–5–1	Lambeau Field	Recap
13	November 28	at **Detroit Lions**	**L** 10–40	5–6–1	Ford Field	Recap
14	December 8	Atlanta Falcons	**W** 22–21	6–6–1	Lambeau Field	Recap
15	December 15	at Dallas Cowboys	**W** 37–36	7–6–1	AT&T Stadium	Recap
16	December 22	Pittsburgh Steelers	**L** 31–38	7–7–1	Lambeau Field	Recap
17	December 29	at **Chicago Bears**	**W** 33–28	8–7–1	Soldier Field	Recap

Note: Intra-division opponents are in bold text.

=== Postseason ===
Playoff round	Date	Opponent	Result	Record	Game site	NFL.com recap
Wild Card	January 5	San Francisco 49ers (5)	**L** 20–23	0–1	Lambeau Field	Recap

== Game summaries ==
=== Regular season ===
==== Week 1: at San Francisco 49ers ====
Week One: Green Bay Packers at San Francisco 49ers – Game summary

Quarter	1	2	3	4	Total
Packers	7	7	7	7	28
49ers	7	7	7	13	34

at Candlestick Park, San Francisco, California

- Date: September 8
- Game time: 3:25 p.m. CDT/1:25 p.m. PDT
- Game weather: 69 °F (21 °C), sunny
- Game attendance: 69,732
- Referee: Bill Leavy
- TV announcers (Fox): Joe Buck, Troy Aikman and Pam Oliver
- Recap, Game book

Game information

First quarter

- SF – Vernon Davis 20-yard pass from Colin Kaepernick (Phil Dawson kick), 2:52. 49ers 7–0. Drive: 13 plays, 83 yards, 6:59.
- GB – Randall Cobb 5-yard pass from Aaron Rodgers (Mason Crosby kick), 1:05. Tied 7–7. Drive: 6 plays, 80 yards, 1:47.

Second quarter

- SF – Anquan Boldin 10-yard pass from Colin Kaepernick (Phil Dawson kick), 8:57. 49ers 14–7. Drive: 3 plays, 14 yards, 2:18.
- GB – Jermichael Finley 12-yard pass from Aaron Rodgers (Mason Crosby kick), 0:16. Tied 14–14. Drive: 8 plays, 62 yards, 1:16.

Third quarter

- SF – Vernon Davis 2-yard pass from Colin Kaepernick (Phil Dawson kick), 9:46. 49ers 21–14. Drive: 9 plays, 80 yards, 5:14.
- GB – Jordy Nelson 8-yard pass from Aaron Rodgers (Mason Crosby kick), 3:49. Tied 21–21. Drive: 7 plays, 69 yards, 2:48.

Fourth quarter

- SF – Phil Dawson 27-yard field goal, 14:17. 49ers 24–21. Drive: 10 plays, 71 yards, 4:31.
- GB – Eddie Lacy 2-yard run (Mason Crosby kick), 8:26. Packers 28–24. Drive: 8 plays, 76 yards, 2:30.
- SF – Frank Gore 1-yard run (Phil Dawson kick), 5:47. 49ers 31–28. Drive: 5 plays, 80 yards, 2:39.
- SF – Phil Dawson 33-yard field goal, 0:26. 49ers 34–28. Drive: 11 plays, 50 yards, 4:26.

Top passers

- GB – Aaron Rodgers – 21/37, 333 yards, 3 TD, INT
- SF – Colin Kaepernick – 27/39, 412 yards, 3 TD

Top rushers

- GB – Eddie Lacy – 14 rushes, 41 yards, TD
- SF – Frank Gore – 21 rushes, 44 yards, TD

Top receivers

- GB – Jordy Nelson – 7 receptions, 130 yards, TD
- SF – Anquan Boldin – 13 receptions, 208 yards, TD

==== Week 2: vs. Washington Redskins ====
Week Two: Washington Redskins at Green Bay Packers – Game summary

Quarter	1	2	3	4	Total
Redskins	0	0	7	13	20
Packers	10	14	14	0	38

at Lambeau Field, Green Bay, Wisconsin

- Date: September 15
- Game time: 12:00 pm. CDT
- Game weather: 63 °F (17 °C), (Rain)
- Game attendance: 78,020
- Referee: Tony Corrente
- TV announcers (Fox): Joe Buck, Troy Aikman and Pam Oliver
- Recap, Game book

Game information

First quarter

- GB – Mason Crosby 28-yard field goal, 8:02. Packers 3–0. Drive: 14 plays, 70 yards, 6:58.
- GB – Randall Cobb 35-yard pass from Aaron Rodgers (Mason Crosby kick), 2:27. Packers 10–0. Drive: 4 plays, 42 yards, 0:41.

Second quarter

- GB – Jordy Nelson 14-yard pass from Aaron Rodgers (Mason Crosby kick), 11:40. Packers 17–0. Drive: 8 plays, 75 yards, 3:13.
- GB – Jermichael Finley 3-yard pass from Aaron Rodgers (Mason Crosby kick), 7:07. Packers 24–0. Drive: 6 plays, 90 yards, 2:57.

Third quarter

- GB – Jordy Nelson 15-yard pass from Aaron Rodgers (Mason Crosby kick), 8:16. Packers 31–0. Drive: 4 plays, 60 yards, 1:53.
- WAS – Pierre Garcon 6-yard pass from Robert Griffin III (John Potter kick), 4:15. Packers 31–7. Drive: 8 plays, 83 yards, 4:01.
- GB – James Starks 32-yard run (Mason Crosby kick), 2:41. Packers 38–7. Drive: 4 plays, 80 yards, 1:34.

Fourth quarter

- WAS – Jordan Reed 3-yard pass from Robert Griffin III (John Potter kick), 11:02. Packers 38–14. Drive: 12 plays, 80 yards, 6:39.
- WAS – Santana Moss 9-yard pass from Robert Griffin III (pass failed), 7:36. Packers 38–20. Drive: 6 plays, 45 yards, 1:38.

Top passers

- WAS – Robert Griffin III – 26/40, 320 yards, 3 TD, INT
- GB – Aaron Rodgers – 34/42, 480 yards, 4 TD

Top rushers

- WAS – Alfred Morris – 13 rushes, 107 yards
- GB – James Starks – 20 rushes, 132 yards, TD

Top receivers

- WAS – Pierre Garcon – 8 receptions, 143 yards, TD
- GB – James Jones – 11 receptions, 178 yards

Following their loss to the 49ers 28–34 at Candlestick Park in Week 1, the Packers went back home to Lambeau to take on the 0–1 Washington Redskins. On the opening drive, Eddie Lacy suffered a concussion after a helmet-to helmet hit with Brandon Meriweather. He exited the game and James Starks replaced him. The Packers drew first blood with a 28-yard field goal. They then followed it up with a 35-yard touchdown pass to Randall Cobb on 4th and 3 to take a 10–0 lead. The Packers took advantage of Robert Griffin III's limited mobility and shut out the Redskins' offense in the 1st half. The Packers continued to pile up yards and points, first with a 14-yard touchdown pass to Jordy Nelson and then with a 3-yard touchdown pass to Jermichael Finley. By halftime, the Packers had a commanding 24–0 lead. Early in the 3rd quarter, Aaron Rodgers once again connected with Jordy Nelson for a 15-yard touchdown to take a 31–0 lead. The Redskins finally manage to sustain a drive and capped it off with a 6-yard touchdown pass to Pierre Garçon. However, the Packers responded with a 32-yard touchdown run by James Starks to make it 38–7. The Redskins managed to score two more touchdowns in the 4th quarter, first a 3-yard touchdown pass to Jordan Reed, then a 9-yard touchdown pass to Santana Moss (failed 2-point conversion). Up 38–20 with 7:36 remaining in the 4th, the Packers managed to sustain a drive to run out the clock and win their first game of the 2013 season. Aaron Rodgers was 34–42 for 480 yards and 4 touchdown passes, while James Starks rushed 20 times for 132 yards and a touchdown. Rodgers managed to tie Matt Flynn against Detroit in 2011 for the franchise record of passing yards in a single game (480). With the win, the Packers were 1–1.

==== Week 3: at Cincinnati Bengals ====
Week Three: Green Bay Packers at Cincinnati Bengals – Game summary

Quarter	1	2	3	4	Total
Packers	0	16	14	0	30
Bengals	14	0	7	13	34

at Paul Brown Stadium, Cincinnati, Ohio

- Date: September 22
- Game time: 1:00 p.m. EDT/12:00 pm. CDT
- Game weather: 63 °F (17 °C), partly cloudy
- Game attendance: 64,633
- Referee: Clete Blakeman
- TV announcers (Fox): Joe Buck, Troy Aikman and Pam Oliver
- Recap, Game book

Game information

First quarter

- CIN – Giovani Bernard 3-yard run (Mike Nugent kick), 9:20. Bengals 7–0. Drive: 10 plays, 80 yards, 5:40.
- CIN – BenJarvus Green-Ellis 2-yard run (Mike Nugent kick), 9:08. Bengals 14–0. Drive: 1 play, 2 yards, 0:12.

Second quarter

- GB – Mason Crosby 41-yard field goal, 14:57. Bengals 14–3. Drive: 4 plays, 3 yards, 0:46.
- GB – MD Jennings 24-yard fumble return (Mason Crosby kick), 11:22. Bengals 14–10.
- GB – Mason Crosby 19-yard field goal, 6:32. Bengals 14–13. Drive: 7 plays, 20 yards, 3:11.
- GB – Mason Crosby 26-yard field goal, 0:00. Packers 16–14. Drive: 12 plays, 70 yards, 5:35.

Third quarter

- GB – Johnathan Franklin 2-yard run (Mason Crosby kick), 11:40. Packers 23–14. Drive: 9 plays, 80 yards, 3:20.
- GB – James Jones 7-yard pass from Aaron Rodgers (Mason Crosby kick), 5:30. Packers 30–14. Drive: 5 plays, 92 yards, 1:48.
- CIN – A. J. Green 20-yard pass from Andy Dalton (Mike Nugent kick), 3:50. Packers 30–21. Drive: 4 plays, 65 yards, 1:40.

Fourth quarter

- CIN – Marvin Jones Jr. 11-yard pass from Andy Dalton (kick failed), 10:55. Packers 30–27. Drive: 7 plays, 95 yards, 2:46.
- CIN – Terence Newman 58-yard fumble return (Mike Nugent kick), 3:47. Bengals 34–30.

Top passers

- GB – Aaron Rodgers – 26/43, 244 yards, TD, 2 INT
- CIN – Andy Dalton – 20/28, 235 yards, 2 TD, INT

Top rushers

- GB – Johnathan Franklin – 13 rushes, 103 yards, TD
- CIN – Giovani Bernard – 10 rushes, 50 yards, TD

Top receivers

- GB – Jordy Nelson – 8 receptions, 93 yards
- CIN – Mohamed Sanu – 4 receptions, 68 yards

In a turnover-infested game, both teams each committed four with Aaron Rodgers throwing two interceptions and Andy Dalton throwing one pick to Sam Shields. Two other Packer turnovers were fumbles, the last of which came from Johnathan Franklin with Terence Newman returning it for a touchdown to give the Bengals the lead after trailing 30-14 in the 3rd quarter. With the loss, the Packers fell to 1–2 entering their bye week.

==== Week 5: vs. Detroit Lions ====
Week Five: Detroit Lions at Green Bay Packers – Game summary

Quarter	1	2	3	4	Total
Lions	0	3	0	6	9
Packers	3	3	10	6	22

at Lambeau Field, Green Bay, Wisconsin

- Date: October 6
- Game time: 12:00 pm. CDT
- Game weather: 62 °F (17 °C), (Sunny)
- Game attendance: 78,200
- Referee: Jerome Boger
- TV announcers (Fox): Kenny Albert, Daryl Johnston and Tony Siragusa
- Recap, Game book

Game information

First quarter

- GB – Mason Crosby 26-yard field goal, 1:24. Packers 3–0. Drive: 15 plays, 72 yards, 7:50.

Second quarter

- GB – Mason Crosby 52-yard field goal, 11:19. Packers 6–0. Drive: 12 plays, 36 yards, 3:55.
- DET – David Akers 53-yard field goal, 0:15. Packers 6–3. Drive: 13 plays, 54 yards, 3:32.

Third quarter

- GB – Mason Crosby 31-yard field goal, 5:04. Packers 9–3. Drive: 5 plays, 76 yards, 2:20.
- GB – James Jones 83-yard pass from Aaron Rodgers (Mason Crosby kick), 3:12. Packers 16–3. Drive: 2 plays, 78 yards, 0:54.

Fourth quarter

- GB – Mason Crosby 42-yard field goal, 10:16. Packers 19–3. Drive: 9 plays, 56 yards, 4:35.
- GB – Mason Crosby 45-yard field goal, 3:50. Packers 22–3. Drive: 7 plays, 43 yards, 3:11.
- DET – Kris Durham 13-yard pass from Matthew Stafford (pass failed), 2:06. Packers 22–9. Drive: 8 plays, 80 yards, 1:44.

Top passers

- DET – Matthew Stafford – 25/40, 262 yards, TD
- GB – Aaron Rodgers – 20/30, 274 yards, TD

Top rushers

- DET – Reggie Bush – 13 rushes, 44 yards
- GB – Eddie Lacy – 23 rushes, 99 yards

Top receivers

- DET – Reggie Bush – 4 receptions, 25 yards
- GB – Jermichael Finley – 6 receptions, 32 yards

After the heart-breaking 30–34 loss to the Cincinnati Bengals in Paul Brown Stadium, the Packers return to action after their Week 4 bye to take on the 3–1 Detroit Lions at Lambeau. Eddie Lacy returned to action after recovering from a concussion in the past two weeks. He had a very productive game, rushing 23 times for 99 yards. After forcing the Lions to punt on their first possession, the Packers struck first with a 26-yard field goal. They followed it up with a 52-yard field goal to take a 6–0 lead. The Lions managed to answer with a 53-yard field goal to go into halftime down 3–6. Early in the 3rd quarter, Randall Cobb rushed to the Lions 22-yard line for a 67-yard gain. From there, the Packers kicked a 31-yard field goal to take a 9–3 lead. Following a Lions 3-and-out, the Packers struck again with an 83-yard touchdown pass to James Jones to take a 16–3 lead. In the 4th quarter, the Packers added two more field goals, one 42 yards and the other 45 yards, to take a 22–3 lead. The Lions finally find the endzone with a 13-yard touchdown pass to Kris Durham (failed 2-point conversion) to make it 22–9 with 2:04 remaining. However, the Packers ran out the remaining clock and won. The Packers reach .500 again with a 2–2 record.

==== Week 6: at Baltimore Ravens ====
Week Six: Green Bay Packers at Baltimore Ravens – Game summary

Quarter	1	2	3	4	Total
Packers	3	3	10	3	19
Ravens	0	0	3	14	17

at M&T Bank Stadium, Baltimore, Maryland

- Date: October 13
- Game time: 1:00 pm. EDT/12:00 pm. CDT
- Game weather: 61 °F (16 °C), cloudy
- Game attendance: 71,319
- Referee: Gene Steratore
- TV announcers (Fox): Kenny Albert, Daryl Johnston and Tony Siragusa
- Recap, Game book

Game information

First quarter

- GB – Mason Crosby 45-yard field goal, 13:11. Packers 3–0. Drive: 6 plays, 53 yards, 1:49.

Second quarter

- GB – Mason Crosby 31-yard field goal, 0:00. Packers 6–0. Drive: 1 play, 0 yards, 0:02.

Third quarter

- GB – Mason Crosby 50-yard field goal, 6:06. Packers 9–0. Drive: 6 plays, 38 yards, 3:04.
- BAL – Justin Tucker 23-yard field goal, 4:34. Packers 9–3. Drive: 5 plays, 60 yards, 1:32.
- GB – Jordy Nelson 64-yard pass from Aaron Rodgers (Mason Crosby kick), 2:12. Packers 16–3. Drive: 4 plays, 80 yards, 2:22.

Fourth quarter

- BAL – Jacoby Jones 11-yard pass from Joe Flacco (Justin Tucker kick), 11:52. Packers 16–10. Drive: 10 plays, 80 yards, 5:22.
- GB – Mason Crosby 31-yard field goal, 4:17. Packers 19–10. Drive: 12 plays, 72 yards, 7:35.
- BAL – Dallas Clark 18-yard pass from Joe Flacco (Justin Tucker kick), 2:04. Packers 19–17. Drive: 6 plays, 90 yards, 2:13.

Top passers

- GB – Aaron Rodgers – 17/32, 315 yards, TD, INT
- BAL – Joe Flacco – 20/34, 342 yards, 2 TD

Top rushers

- GB – Eddie Lacy – 23 rushes, 120 yards
- BAL – Ray Rice – 14 rushes, 34 yards

Top receivers

- GB – Jordy Nelson – 4 receptions, 113 yards, TD
- BAL – Tandon Doss – 4 receptions, 99 yards

After defeating the Detroit Lions 22–9 at Lambeau Field, the Packers travelled to M&T Bank Stadium to take on the defending Super Bowl champions Baltimore Ravens. Eddie Lacy had a breakout game, rushing for 120 yards on 23 carries. On the first drive, Lacy rushed for 10- and 37-yard gains before settling for a 45-yard field goal to take a 3–0 lead. Both defenses played exceptionally well in the 1st half, highlighted by Green Bay's 4th down goal-line stand against Bernard Pierce. The Packers suffered severe injuries to the offense, however, as both James Jones and Randall Cobb would exit the game in the 1st half with leg injuries. 4th-string receiver Jarrett Boykin saw extended playing time in the wake of their absences. With less than 20 seconds remaining in the half, Nick Perry forced a Joe Flacco fumble that was returned by Datone Jones to the 13-yard line. From there, the Packers settled for a 31-yard field goal and a 6–0 lead at halftime. After trading punts to begin the 2nd half, Aaron Rodgers' pass intended for Jordy Nelson was intercepted by Jimmy Smith in the endzone. After Baltimore punted, Jarrett Boykin, who struggled in the 1st half, took a screen pass 43 yards to the Baltimore 25. From there, the Packers extended their lead to 9–0 after a 50-yard field goal. Following a 53-yard pass to Marlon Brown, the Ravens settled for a 23-yard field goal. Late in the 3rd quarter, Aaron Rodgers lofted a 64-yard pass to Jordy Nelson to extend their lead 16–3. However, the Ravens stayed in the ballgame with an 11-yard pass to Jacoby Jones. The Packers tried to ice the game with a 31-yard field goal to make it 19–10 with 4:17 remaining in the 4th quarter. However, on 4th and 21, Joe Flacco found a wide open Tandon Doss for 63 yards. It appeared that Jerron McMillian slipped while covering Doss. On the very next play, Flacco found Desmond Clark for an 18-yard touchdown to make it 19–17 with 2:04 remaining. The Packers preserved the 2-point lead with a 52-yard pass to Jermichael Finley on 3rd and 3 and with a 4-yard run by Eddie Lacy on 3rd and 2. With the 19–17 win, the Packers went above .500 for the first time in the 2013 season with a 3–2 record. After the game, Randall Cobb would be put on IR with designation to return, and James Jones would be out for the next 2 games.

==== Week 7: vs. Cleveland Browns ====
Week Seven: Cleveland Browns at Green Bay Packers – Game summary

Quarter	1	2	3	4	Total
Browns	0	3	3	7	13
Packers	14	3	0	14	31

at Lambeau Field, Green Bay, Wisconsin

- Date: October 20
- Game time: 3:25 pm. CDT
- Game weather: 44 °F (7 °C), (Light Rain)
- Game attendance: 77,804
- Referee: Jeff Triplette
- TV announcers (CBS): Kevin Harlan and Solomon Wilcots
- Recap, Game book

Game information

First quarter

- GB – Jermichael Finley 10-yard pass from Aaron Rodgers (Mason Crosby kick), 12:29. Packers 7–0. Drive: 4 plays, 40 yards, 1:38.
- GB – Eddie Lacy 1-yard run (Mason Crosby kick), 3:48. Packers 14–0. Drive: 11 plays, 56 yards, 5:49.

Second quarter

- CLE – Billy Cundiff 46-yard field goal, 5:15. Packers 14–3. Drive: 12 plays, 60 yards, 6:25.
- GB – Mason Crosby 26-yard field goal, 0:06. Packers 17–3. Drive: 14 plays, 61 yards, 5:08.

Third quarter

- CLE – Billy Cundiff 44-yard field goal, 5:07. Packers 17–6. Drive: 7 plays, 20 yards, 1:45.

Fourth quarter

- GB – Jordy Nelson 1-yard pass from Aaron Rodgers (Mason Crosby kick), 8:33. Packers 24–6. Drive: 5 plays, 69 yards, 2:39.
- CLE – Jordan Cameron 2-yard pass from Brandon Weeden (Billy Cundiff kick), 6:13. Packers 24–13. Drive: 7 plays, 20 yards, 2:21.
- GB – Jarrett Boykin 20-yard pass from Aaron Rodgers (Mason Crosby kick), 3:52. Packers 31–13. Drive: 4 plays, 54 yards, 2:24.

Top passers

- CLE – Brandon Weeden – 17/42, 149 yards, TD, INT
- GB – Aaron Rodgers – 25/36, 260 yards, 3 TD

Top rushers

- CLE – Willis McGahee – 11 rushes, 39 yards
- GB – Eddie Lacy – 22 rushes, 82 yards, TD

Top receivers

- CLE – Jordan Cameron – 7 receptions, 55 yards, TD
- GB – Jarrett Boykin – 8 receptions, 103 yards, TD

After their win against the Baltimore Ravens 19–17, the Packers, wearing their throwback jerseys of blue and yellow, returned home to Lambeau Field to take on the Cleveland Browns. Both James Jones and Randall Cobb would be inactive for the game, and Jarrett Boykin got his first career start. He had a breakout game, catching 8 passes for 103 yards and a touchdown. After forcing the Browns to punt on their opening possession, the Packers quickly struck with a 10-yard touchdown pass to Jermichael Finley. After Brandon Weeden's pass was intercepted by Davon House on the next drive, the Packers took advantage with a 1-yard run by Eddie Lacy to take a 14–0 lead in the 1st quarter. After Cleveland scored on a 46-yard field goal, the Packers responded with a 26-yard field goal to take a 17–3 lead at halftime. In the 3rd quarter, the Browns scored on a 44-yard field goal to make it 17–6. Early in the 4th quarter, the Browns decided to go for it on 4th down and 15 on the Packers 31-yard line. The pass to Jordan Cameron in the endzone was incomplete and the Packers took over. On the drive, Jermichael Finley was carried off the field on a stretcher after suffering a neck injury. The Packers capped off that drive with a 1-yard touchdown pass to Jordy Nelson. They followed it up with a 20-yard touchdown pass to Jarrett Boykin, taking a 31–13 win. About two weeks after the game, Jermichael Finley was put on IR. With the win, the Packers extended their winning streak to three games and improved to 4–2.

==== Week 8: at Minnesota Vikings ====
Week Eight: Green Bay Packers at Minnesota Vikings – Game summary

Quarter	1	2	3	4	Total
Packers	7	17	7	13	44
Vikings	7	10	0	14	31

at Mall of America Field at the Hubert H. Humphrey Metrodome, Minneapolis, Minnesota

- Date: October 27
- Game time: 7:30 pm. CDT
- Game weather: Played indoors (dome stadium)
- Game attendance: 64,134
- Referee: Scott Green
- TV announcers (NBC): Al Michaels, Cris Collinsworth and Michele Tafoya
- Recap, Game book

Game information

First quarter

- MIN – Cordarrelle Patterson 109-yard kickoff return (Blair Walsh kick), 14:47. Vikings 7–0.
- GB – Jordy Nelson 11-yard pass from Aaron Rodgers (Mason Crosby kick), 7:23. Tied 7–7. Drive: 14 plays, 90 yards, 7:24.

Second quarter

- GB – Mason Crosby 30-yard field goal, 10:29. Packers 10–7. Drive: 17 plays, 70 yards, 8:24.
- MIN – Blair Walsh 36-yard field goal, 5:09. Tied 10–10. Drive: 11 plays, 62 yards, 5:20.
- GB – Jordy Nelson 76-yard pass from Aaron Rodgers (Mason Crosby kick), 3:38. Packers 17–10. Drive: 3 plays, 80 yards, 1:31.
- GB – Micah Hyde 93-yard punt return (Mason Crosby kick), 1:30. Packers 24–10.
- MIN – Adrian Peterson 8-yard run (Blair Walsh kick), 0:04. Packers 24–17. Drive: 8 plays, 77 yards, 1:26.

Third quarter

- GB – Eddie Lacy 1-yard run (Mason Crosby kick), 6:50. Packers 31–17. Drive: 15 plays, 80 yards, 8:10.

Fourth quarter

- GB – James Starks 25-yard run (Mason Crosby kick), 14:16. Packers 38–17. Drive: 9 plays, 74 yards, 5:32.
- GB – Mason Crosby 20-yard field goal, 6:10. Packers 41–17. Drive: 10 plays, 53 yards, 6:36.
- MIN – Toby Gerhart 13-yard run (Blair Walsh kick), 4:42. Packers 41–24. Drive: 5 plays, 58 yards, 1:28.
- GB – Mason Crosby 45-yard field goal, 2:53. Packers 44–24. Drive: 6 plays, 16 yards, 1:49.
- MIN – Christian Ponder 19-yard run (Blair Walsh kick), 1:24. Packers 44–31. Drive: 5 plays, 73 yards, 1:29.

Top passers

- GB – Aaron Rodgers – 24/29, 285 yards, 2 TD
- MIN – Christian Ponder – 14/21, 145 yards

Top rushers

- GB – Eddie Lacy – 29 rushes, 94 yards, TD
- MIN – Adrian Peterson – 13 rushes, 60 yards, TD

Top receivers

- GB – Jordy Nelson – 7 receptions, 123 yards, 2 TD
- MIN – Kyle Rudolph – 4 receptions, 51 yards

After defeating the Cleveland Browns 31–13 at Lambeau Field, the Packers travelled to the Hubert H. Humphrey Metrodome to take on the Minnesota Vikings on Sunday Night Football. This was the Packers' last game at the Metrodome, for the Minnesota Vikings would play at TCF Bank Stadium for the following two seasons. On the opening kickoff, Cordarrelle Patterson returned the kick 109 yards for a touchdown. Green Bay responded with a 14 play, 7:24-minute drive that ended with an 11-yard touchdown pass to Jordy Nelson. After the Vikings punt, the Packers led a 17-play, 8:24-minute drive that ended with a 30-yard field goal. After the Vikings responded with a 36-yard field goal, Aaron Rodgers zipped a 76-yard touchdown pass to Jordy Nelson. A 93-yard punt return by Micah Hyde made it 24–10 with less than two minutes remaining. The Vikings, aided by a 26-yard pass interference penalty, scored on an 8-yard touchdown run by Adrian Peterson to make it 24–17 at halftime. On the first possession of the 2nd half, the Packers led another time-consuming drive that ended with a 1-yard touchdown run by Eddie Lacy. After Christian Ponder was sacked by Mike Daniels on 3rd down, the Packers scored easily against a tired Minnesota defense on a 25-yard run by James Starks to pull a commanding 38–17 lead at the beginning of the 4th quarter. The effective tandem between Eddie Lacy and James Starks salted the game away, and the Vikings' brief comeback fell short. The Packers had an overwhelming advantage in time of possession with 40:54 compared to the Vikings' 19:06. The Packers did not punt all night and they were 2 of 2 on fourth-down conversions. With the 44–31 win, the Packers were 5–2.

==== Week 9: vs. Chicago Bears ====
Week Nine: Chicago Bears at Green Bay Packers – Game summary

Quarter	1	2	3	4	Total
Bears	7	10	7	3	27
Packers	10	0	10	0	20

at Lambeau Field, Green Bay, Wisconsin

- Date: November 4
- Game time: 7:40 pm. CST
- Game weather: 50 °F (10 °C), (Cloudy)
- Game attendance: 78,122
- Referee: Walt Anderson
- TV announcers (ESPN): Mike Tirico, Jon Gruden and Lisa Salters
- Recap, Game book

Game information

First quarter

- GB – Mason Crosby 30-yard field goal, 12:24. Packers 3–0. Drive: 8 plays, 68 yards, 2:36.
- CHI – Brandon Marshall 15-yard pass from Josh McCown (Robbie Gould kick), 9:48. Bears 7–3. Drive: 8 plays, 71 yards, 2:36.
- GB – James Starks 32-yard run (Mason Crosby kick), 3:38. Packers 10–7. Drive: 1 play, 32 yards, 0:07.

Second quarter

- CHI – Matt Forte 1-yard run (Robbie Gould kick), 9:26. Bears 14–10. Drive: 6 plays, 60 yards, 3:36.
- CHI – Robbie Gould 24-yard field goal, 0:00. Bears 17–10. Drive: 12 plays, 93 yards, 4:16.

Third quarter

- GB – Eddie Lacy 1-yard run (Mason Crosby kick), 13:04. Tied 17–17. Drive: 2 plays, 57 yards, 0:53.
- GB – Mason Crosby 23-yard field goal, 8:45. Packers 20–17. Drive: 10 plays, 46 yards, 4:19.
- CHI – Alshon Jeffery 6-yard pass from Josh McCown (Robbie Gould kick), 2:41. Bears 24–20. Drive: 7 plays, 47 yards, 2:38.

Fourth quarter

- CHI – Robbie Gould 27-yard field goal, 0:50. Bears 27–20. Drive: 18 plays, 80 yards, 8:58.

Top passers

- CHI – Josh McCown – 22/41, 272 yards, 2 TD
- GB – Seneca Wallace – 11/19, 114 yards, INT

Top rushers

- CHI – Matt Forte – 24 rushes, 125 yards, TD
- GB – Eddie Lacy – 22 rushes, 150 yards, TD

Top receivers

- CHI – Brandon Marshall – 7 receptions, 107 yards, TD
- GB – Jordy Nelson – 4 receptions, 67 yards

After defeating the Minnesota Vikings 44–31 for the last time in the Metrodome, the Packers returned to Lambeau to take on the Chicago Bears on Monday Night Football. The Bears were without Jay Cutler (groin), so Josh McCown made his first start in the 2013 season. The Packers moved down the field with ease on their first possession, with Rodgers completing a 27-yard pass to Jordy Nelson followed by Eddie Lacy's 16-yard run. However, the drive stalled when Aaron Rodgers was sacked by Shea McClellin on 3rd and 8, so the Packers settled for a 30-yard field goal for the 3–0 lead. Josh McCown then led a drive that ended with a 23-yard touchdown pass to Brandon Marshall, taking a 7–3 lead. It soon became apparent that Aaron Rodgers couldn't return to the game because of an injury suffered on the McClellin sack. Instead, Seneca Wallace trotted onto the field on the Packers' second possession. It ended with a tipped pass that was intercepted by Julius Peppers. The Bears' punt after their 3-and-out was blocked by Jamari Lattimore and recovered by Chris Banjo, taking possession at the Chicago 32. On the very next play, James Starks bursted through the middle for a 32-yard touchdown run, taking a 10–7 lead. In the 2nd quarter, the Bears took a 14–10 lead following a 1-yard run by Matt Forte. They added a 24-yard field goal at the end of the half to lead 17–10 at halftime. Early in the 3rd quarter, Eddie Lacy sprinted to the Chicago 1-yard line on a 56-yard gain, before punching it in himself to tie the game at 17–17. The Packers successfully recover the ensuing onside kick, but had to settle for a 23-yard field goal to take a 20–17 lead. The Bears responded with a 6-yard touchdown pass to Alshon Jeffery, taking a 24–20 lead. With 9:48 left in the 4th quarter, the Bears sustained an 18 play, 8:58-minute drive that ended with a 27-yard field goal to make it 27–20 with 53 seconds remaining in the game. The Packers tried to make a comeback, but after a 15-yard pass to Jordy Nelson, Seneca Wallace was sacked twice, first by Corey Wootton then by Shea McClellin, and time expired. With the 20–27 loss, the Packers' six-game winning streak against the Chicago Bears was snapped and the Packers fell to 5–3. It was confirmed later in the week that Aaron Rodgers suffered a fractured left collarbone, with his playing status to be determined "week to week." He ended up missing 7 weeks, only to make his return against the same Bears in Week 17 for the NFC North title decider.

==== Week 10: vs. Philadelphia Eagles ====
Week Ten: Philadelphia Eagles at Green Bay Packers – Game summary

Quarter	1	2	3	4	Total
Eagles	7	3	17	0	27
Packers	0	3	7	3	13

at Lambeau Field, Green Bay, Wisconsin

- Date: November 10
- Game time: 12:00 pm. CST
- Game weather: 46 °F (8 °C), (Sunny)
- Game attendance: 78,011
- Referee: Mike Carey
- TV announcers (Fox): Joe Buck, Troy Aikman and Pam Oliver
- Recap, Game book

Game information

First quarter

- PHI – DeSean Jackson 55-yard pass from Nick Foles (Alex Henery kick), 5:57. Eagles 7–0. Drive: 2 plays, 57 yards, 0:25.

Second quarter

- PHI – Alex Henery 25-yard field goal, 1:16. Eagles 10–0. Drive: 9 plays, 60 yards, 1:38.
- GB – Mason Crosby 26-yard field goal, 0:02. Eagles 10–3. Drive: 9 plays, 72 yards, 1:14.

Third quarter

- PHI – Riley Cooper 45-yard pass from Nick Foles (Alex Henery kick), 11:21. Eagles 17–3. Drive: 3 plays, 84 yards, 0:51.
- PHI – Alex Henery 41-yard field goal, 7:28. Eagles 20–3. Drive: 5 plays, 21 yards, 1:39.
- GB – Brandon Bostick 22-yard pass from Scott Tolzien (Mason Crosby kick), 3:22. Eagles 20–10. Drive: 7 plays, 86 yards, 4:06.
- PHI – Riley Cooper 32-yard pass from Nick Foles (Alex Henery kick), 0:10. Eagles 27–10. Drive: 7 plays, 80 yards, 3:12.

Fourth quarter

- GB – Mason Crosby 35-yard field goal, 12:19. Eagles 27–13. Drive: 8 plays, 54 yards, 2:51.

Top passers

- PHI – Nick Foles – 12/18, 228 yards, 3 TD
- GB – Scott Tolzien – 24/39, 280 yards, TD, 2 INT

Top rushers

- PHI – LeSean McCoy – 25 rushes, 155 yards
- GB – Eddie Lacy – 24 rushes, 73 yards

Top receivers

- PHI – Riley Cooper – 3 receptions, 102 yards, 2 TD
- GB – Jarrett Boykin – 8 receptions, 112 yards

After the Packers' first possession, QB Seneca Wallace exited the game with a groin injury and was replaced by Scott Tolzien, who threw for 280 yards with a touchdown and two interceptions. With the loss, the Packers fell to 5–4.

==== Week 11: at New York Giants ====
Week Eleven: Green Bay Packers at New York Giants – Game summary

Quarter	1	2	3	4	Total
Packers	0	6	0	7	13
Giants	7	3	10	7	27

at MetLife Stadium, East Rutherford, New Jersey

- Date: November 17
- Game time: 4:25 pm. EST/3:25 pm. CST
- Game weather: 59 °F (15 °C), mostly cloudy
- Game attendance: 79,114
- Referee: Terry McAulay
- TV announcers (Fox): Kenny Albert, Daryl Johnston and Tony Siragusa
- Recap, Game book

Game information

First quarter

- NYG – Rueben Randle 26-yard pass from Eli Manning (Josh Brown kick), 5:34. Giants 7–0. Drive: 5 plays, 42 yards, 2:57.

Second quarter

- NYG – Josh Brown 40-yard field goal, 14:03. Giants 10–0. Drive: 11 plays, 56 yards, 4:56.
- GB – Mason Crosby 24-yard field goal, 10:21. Giants 10–3. Drive: 7 plays, 76 yards, 3:42.
- GB – Mason Crosby 57-yard field goal, 0:00. Giants 10–6. Drive: 4 plays, 24 yards, 0:43.

Third quarter

- NYG – Josh Brown 28-yard field goal, 10:06. Giants 13–6. Drive: 5 plays, 40 yards, 2:10.
- NYG – Brandon Jacobs 1-yard run (Josh Brown kick), 0:25. Giants 20–6. Drive: 10 plays, 63 yards, 6:07.

Fourth quarter

- GB – Eddie Lacy 4-yard run (Mason Crosby kick), 12:43. Giants 20–13. Drive: 5 plays, 83 yards, 2:42.
- NYG – Jason Pierre-Paul 24-yard interception return (Josh Brown kick), 10:49. Giants 27–13.

Top passers

- GB – Scott Tolzien – 24/34, 339 yards, 3 INT
- NYG – Eli Manning – 25/35, 279 yards, TD, INT

Top rushers

- GB – Eddie Lacy – 14 rushes, 27 yards, TD
- NYG – Andre Brown – 18 rushes, 66 yards

Top receivers

- GB – Jordy Nelson – 8 receptions, 117 yards
- NYG – Victor Cruz – 8 receptions, 110 yards

==== Week 12: vs. Minnesota Vikings ====
Week Twelve: Minnesota Vikings at Green Bay Packers – Game summary

Quarter	1	2	3	4	OT	Total
Vikings	3	10	7	3	3	26
Packers	7	0	0	16	3	26

at Lambeau Field, Green Bay, Wisconsin

- Date: November 24
- Game time: 12:00 pm. CST
- Game weather: 21 °F (−6 °C), (Sunny)
- Game attendance: 77,871
- Referee: Bill Vinovich
- TV announcers (Fox): Kevin Burkhardt, John Lynch and Erin Andrews
- Recap, Game book

Game information

First quarter

- GB – Scott Tolzien 6-yard run (Mason Crosby kick), 4:59. Packers 7–0. Drive: 11 plays, 87 yards, 5:59.
- MIN – Blair Walsh 36-yard field goal, 1:37. Packers 7–3. Drive: 6 plays, 24 yards, 3:22.

Second quarter

- MIN – Blair Walsh 47-yard field goal, 4:24. Packers 7–6. Drive: 10 plays, 69 yards, 4:23.
- MIN – Adrian Peterson 1-yard run (Blair Walsh kick), 0:50. Vikings 13–7. Drive: 7 plays, 63 yards, 2:24.

Third quarter

- MIN – Rhett Ellison 12-yard pass from Christian Ponder (Blair Walsh kick), 8:22. Vikings 20–7. Drive: 6 plays, 59 yards, 3:28.

Fourth quarter

- MIN – Blair Walsh 29-yard field goal, 14:22. Vikings 23–7. Drive: 12 plays, 85 yards, 6:04.
- GB – Eddie Lacy 3-yard run (pass failed), 11:42. Vikings 23–13. Drive: 9 plays, 80 yards, 2:40.
- GB – Jarrett Boykin 6-yard pass from Matt Flynn (Mason Crosby kick), 3:30. Vikings 23–20. Drive: 12 plays, 76 yards, 5:10.
- GB – Mason Crosby 27-yard field goal, 0:46. Tied 23–23. Drive: 10 plays, 60 yards, 1:41.

Overtime

- GB – Mason Crosby 20-yard field goal, 10:25. Packers 26–23. Drive: 10 plays, 77 yards, 4:35.
- MIN – Blair Walsh 35-yard field goal, 3:49. Tied 26–26. Drive: 12 plays, 63 yards, 6:36.

Top passers

- MIN – Christian Ponder – 21/30, 233 yards, TD
- GB – Matt Flynn – 21/36, 218 yards, TD

Top rushers

- MIN – Adrian Peterson – 32 rushes, 146 yards, TD
- GB – Eddie Lacy – 25 rushes, 110 yards, TD

Top receivers

- MIN – Cordarrelle Patterson – 8 receptions, 54 yards
- GB – James Jones – 7 receptions, 80 yards

Packers QB Scott Tolzien was benched midway through the 3rd quarter in favor of Matt Flynn. Down 23–7 at the beginning of the 4th quarter, Flynn and the offense tied the game at 23–23 to go into overtime. After the Packers offense scored a field goal in the opening possession, Minnesota was able to answer with a field goal of their own, and after a series of back-and-forth possessions, overtime came to an end at 26–26. It was the first tie between the two teams since 1978. With the tie, the Packers went to 5–5–1.

==== Week 13: at Detroit Lions ====
Thanksgiving Day game

Week Thirteen: Green Bay Packers at Detroit Lions – Game summary

Quarter	1	2	3	4	Total
Packers	0	10	0	0	10
Lions	0	17	9	14	40

at Ford Field, Detroit, Michigan

- Date: November 28
- Game time: 12:30 pm. EST/11:30 am. CST
- Game weather: Played indoors (dome stadium)
- Game attendance: 64,934
- Referee: Gene Steratore
- TV announcers (Fox): Joe Buck, Troy Aikman, Pam Oliver and Erin Andrews
- Recap, Game book

Game information

First quarter

- No scoring plays.

Second quarter

- DET – David Akers 27-yard field goal, 14:51. Lions 3–0. Drive: 11 plays, 80 yards, 5:42.
- GB – Mason Crosby 54-yard field goal, 12:41. Tied 3–3. Drive: 5 plays, 24 yards, 2:10.
- GB – Morgan Burnett 1-yard fumble return (Mason Crosby kick), 12:33. Packers 10–3.
- DET – Jeremy Ross 5-yard pass from Matthew Stafford (David Akers kick), 4:33. Tied 10–10. Drive: 8 plays, 85 yards, 4:09.
- DET – Reggie Bush 1-yard run (David Akers kick), 1:22. Lions 17–10. Drive: 3 plays, 33 yards, 1:16.

Third quarter

- DET – Calvin Johnson 20-yard pass from Matthew Stafford (David Akers kick), 9:08. Lions 24–10. Drive: 9 plays, 63 yards, 4:22.
- DET – Matt Flynn sacked in the end zone by Ndamukong Suh for a safety, 0:53. Lions 26–10.

Fourth quarter

- DET – Joique Bell 1-yard run (David Akers kick), 13:06. Lions 33–10. Drive: 5 plays, 58 yards, 2:47.
- DET – Kevin Ogletree 20-yard pass from Matthew Stafford (David Akers kick), 4:17. Lions 40–10. Drive: 11 plays, 75 yards, 7:18.

Top passers

- GB – Matt Flynn – 10/20, 139 yards, INT
- DET – Matthew Stafford – 22/35, 330 yards, 3 TD, 2 INT

Top rushers

- GB – Eddie Lacy – 10 rushes, 16 yards
- DET – Reggie Bush – 20 rushes, 117 yards, TD

Top receivers

- GB – James Jones – 3 receptions, 79 yards
- DET – Calvin Johnson – 6 receptions, 101 yards, TD

Following a rare tie with the Minnesota Vikings 26–26 at Lambeau Field, the Packers travelled to Ford Field to take on the Detroit Lions on Thanksgiving football. Due to Matt Flynn's performance the previous week, he replaces Scott Tolzien and makes his first start for the Packers in the 2013 season. The Lions' opening possession ended at the Green Bay 12 when Clay Matthews forced a Reggie Bush fumble that was recovered by Morgan Burnett. However, the Packers could not capitalize and the Lions drew first blood with a 27-yard field goal. Following a kickoff that went out-of-bounds, the Packers answered with a 54-yard field goal to tie it at 3–3. The Packers quickly struck again when Nick Perry forced a Matthew Stafford fumble that was returned by Morgan Burnett for a touchdown for a 10–3 lead. The Lions answered by scoring two touchdowns, first a 5-yard touchdown pass to Jeremy Ross, then a 1-yard run by Reggie Bush. Detroit had opportunities for more points before the half, but David Akers missed a 31-yard field goal as the 1st half expired, keeping a 17–10 lead. Following a 3-and-out on Green Bay's opening possession in the 3rd quarter, the Lions scored on a 20-yard touchdown pass to Calvin Johnson, extending their lead 24–10. Late in the 3rd quarter, Ndamukong Suh sacked Matt Flynn in the endzone, forcing a safety that made it 26–10. The Lions capitalized on their next possession with a 1-yard run by Joique Bell. They followed that up with a 20-yard touchdown pass to Kevin Ogletree, which extended their lead 40–10. The Packers tried to rally with a 56-yard pass to James Jones, but Matt Flynn fumbled the snap on the next play; Detroit recovered and ran out the clock. This loss marked Matthew Stafford's first career win against the Packers. It also snapped the Lions' 10-year losing streak on Thanksgiving Day. With the loss, the Packers fell to 5–6–1.

==== Week 14: vs. Atlanta Falcons ====
Week Fourteen: Atlanta Falcons at Green Bay Packers – Game summary

Quarter	1	2	3	4	Total
Falcons	0	21	0	0	21
Packers	7	3	6	6	22

at Lambeau Field, Green Bay, Wisconsin

- Date: December 8
- Game time: 12:00 pm. CST
- Game weather: 12 °F (−11 °C), (Snow)
- Game attendance: 77,550
- Referee: Bill Leavy
- TV announcers (Fox): Thom Brennaman, Brian Billick and Laura Okmin
- Recap, Game book

Game information

First quarter

- GB – Eddie Lacy 1-yard run (Mason Crosby kick), 0:00. Packers 7–0. Drive: 18 plays, 90 yards, 9:07.

Second quarter

- ATL – Drew Davis 36-yard pass from Matt Ryan (Matt Bryant kick), 11:01. Tied 7–7. Drive: 7 plays, 78 yards, 3:59.
- ATL – Tony Gonzalez 2-yard pass from Matt Ryan (Matt Bryant kick), 8:43. Falcons 14–7. Drive: 4 plays, 13 yards, 2:06.
- GB – Mason Crosby 40-yard field goal, 3:39. Falcons 14–10. Drive: 11 plays, 40 yards, 5:04.
- ATL – Sean Weatherspoon 71-yard interception return (Matt Bryant kick), 0:23. Falcons 21–10.

Third quarter

- GB – Mason Crosby 33-yard field goal, 9:06. Falcons 21–13. Drive: 6 plays, 58 yards, 3:12.
- GB – Mason Crosby 25-yard field goal, 0:45. Falcons 21–16. Drive: 12 plays, 68 yards, 6:41.

Fourth quarter

- GB – Andrew Quarless 2-yard pass from Matt Flynn (pass failed), 12:01. Packers 22–21. Drive: 4 plays, 21 yards, 1:49.

Top passers

- ATL – Matt Ryan – 20/35, 206 yards, 2 TD, INT
- GB – Matt Flynn – 24/32, 258 yards, TD, INT

Top rushers

- ATL – Steven Jackson – 15 rushes, 71 yards
- GB – Eddie Lacy – 20 rushes, 65 yards, TD

Top receivers

- ATL – Roddy White – 8 receptions, 74 yards
- GB – Andrew Quarless – 6 receptions, 66 yards, TD

After the blowout loss to the Detroit Lions on Thanksgiving Day, the Packers returned to snowy Lambeau Field to take on the 3–9 Atlanta Falcons. Matt Flynn made his 2nd start as quarterback. The Packers struck first with a 1-yard touchdown run by Eddie Lacy just before the 1st quarter ended. However, the Falcons would answer with a 36-yard touchdown pass to Drew Davis, followed by a 2-yard reception by Tony Gonzalez following a Matt Flynn fumble. The Packers responded with a 40-yard field goal to make the score 14–10. Late in the 2nd quarter, Green Bay sustained a drive into Atlanta territory. However, on Atlanta's 35-yard line, Matt Flynn threw a pass that was deflected, intercepted and returned 71 yards for a touchdown by Sean Weatherspoon. There were audible boos as the Packers were down 21–10 at halftime. In the 3rd quarter, Matt Flynn led two drives that both resulted in field goals, making the score 21–16. As the 4th quarter began, Mike Neal forced a Matt Ryan fumble at Atlanta's 25. The Packers capitalized on the turnover with a 2-yard touchdown reception to Andrew Quarless, gaining the lead 22–21. The Packers' defense held for the rest of the 4th quarter as Atlanta missed a 52-yard field goal and also turned the ball over on downs at Green Bay's 33. A Jarrett Bush interception at Green Bay's 37 with 11 seconds remaining sealed the win for the Packers. With the win, the Packers recorded their first win since Aaron Rodgers' injury in Week 9. With the win, the Packers are 6-6-1.

==== Week 15: at Dallas Cowboys ====
Week Fifteen: Green Bay Packers at Dallas Cowboys – Game summary

Quarter	1	2	3	4	Total
Packers	3	0	14	20	37
Cowboys	13	13	3	7	36

at AT&T Stadium, Arlington, Texas

- Date: December 15
- Game time: 3:25 pm. CST
- Game weather: Played indoors (retractable roof closed)
- Game attendance: 91,054
- Referee: Walt Coleman
- TV announcers (Fox): Joe Buck, Troy Aikman and Pam Oliver
- Recap, Game book

Game information

First quarter

- DAL – Dan Bailey 47-yard field goal, 10:56. Cowboys 3–0. Drive: 8 plays, 52 yards, 4:04.
- GB – Mason Crosby 57-yard field goal, 7:40. Tied 3–3. Drive: 6 plays, 41 yards, 3:16.
- DAL – Dan Bailey 23-yard field goal, 4:52. Cowboys 6–3. Drive: 7 plays, 75 yards, 2:48.
- DAL – Jason Witten 25-yard pass from Tony Romo (Dan Bailey kick), 0:28. Cowboys 13–3. Drive: 4 plays, 65 yards, 1:57.

Second quarter

- DAL – Dan Bailey 43-yard field goal, 5:54. Cowboys 16–3. Drive: 8 plays, 48 yards, 3:26.
- DAL – Dan Bailey 50-yard field goal, 3:45. Cowboys 19–3. Drive: 4 plays, -11 yards, 0:53.
- DAL – DeMarco Murray 1-yard run (Dan Bailey kick), 0:24. Cowboys 26–3. Drive: 6 plays, 75 yards, 1:35.

Third quarter

- GB – Jordy Nelson 13-yard pass from Matt Flynn (Mason Crosby kick), 13:08. Cowboys 26–10. Drive: 4 plays, 80 yards, 1:52.
- DAL – Dan Bailey 50-yard field goal, 6:33. Cowboys 29–10. Drive: 11 plays, 48 yards, 6:35.
- GB – Andrew Quarless 3-yard pass from Matt Flynn (Mason Crosby kick), 1:09. Cowboys 29–17. Drive: 12 plays, 80 yards, 5:24.

Fourth quarter

- GB – James Starks 11-yard pass from Matt Flynn (Mason Crosby kick), 12:47. Cowboys 29–24. Drive: 5 plays, 22 yards, 2:14.
- DAL – Dez Bryant 5-yard pass from Tony Romo (Dan Bailey kick), 7:55. Cowboys 36–24. Drive: 10 plays, 80 yards, 4:52.
- GB – James Jones 3-yard pass from Matt Flynn (Mason Crosby kick), 4:17. Cowboys 36–31. Drive: 10 plays, 80 yards, 3:38.
- GB – Eddie Lacy 3-yard run (pass failed), 1:31. Packers 37–36. Drive: 7 plays, 50 yards, 1:15.

Top passers

- GB – Matt Flynn – 26/39, 299 yards, 4 TD, INT
- DAL – Tony Romo – 29/48, 358 yards, 2 TD, 2 INT

Top rushers

- GB – Eddie Lacy – 21 rushes, 141 yards, TD
- DAL – DeMarco Murray – 18 rushes, 134 yards, TD

Top receivers

- GB – Jarrett Boykin – 6 receptions, 83 yards
- DAL – Dez Bryant – 11 receptions, 153 yards, TD

Following a 22–21 comeback win against the Atlanta Falcons, the Packers travelled to AT&T Stadium, the site of Super Bowl XLV, to take on the 7–6 Dallas Cowboys. Matt Flynn made his 3rd start as Aaron Rodgers was deemed not ready to return from a broken collarbone. The two teams traded field goals with their first possessions, but Dallas went on to score 23 unanswered points to take a 26–3 lead at halftime. The 2nd half began with a bang as Eddie Lacy rushed to Dallas' 20-yard line for a 60-yard gain. Three plays later, Matt Flynn connected with Jordy Nelson for a 13-yard touchdown. Tony Romo and the Cowboys offense responded with a field goal to make it 10–29 with over 6 minutes left in the 3rd quarter. On the Packers next drive, Matt Flynn converted two 3rd downs with 22- and 21-yard passes to Andrew Quarless and Jordy Nelson, respectively. Flynn capped the drive with a 3-yard touchdown pass to Quarless to pull within 12 points. After two incompletions, Tony Romo was sacked by Clay Matthews and Dallas was forced to punt before the end of the 3rd quarter. A good punt return by Micah Hyde gave the Packers offense good field position at the Dallas 22. Early in the 4th quarter, James Starks scored on an 11-yard screen pass and made it 24–29. Dallas countered with a 5-yard touchdown pass to Dez Bryant to increase their lead back to 12, but Green Bay responded with a 3-yard touchdown pass to James Jones to make it 31–36. Dallas' next drive ended with an interception by Sam Shields at midfield with 2:50 remaining. The Packers offense led a drive that was capped off by Eddie Lacy's 1-yard touchdown that took the lead 37–36 with 1:34 remaining. After the failed 2-point attempt, Dallas attempted a field goal drive, but Tony Romo's pass was intercepted by Tramon Williams to seal the 23-point comeback win for the Packers. With the win, not only did the Packers improve to 7–6–1, but following the Detroit Lions' loss to the Baltimore Ravens on Monday night, Green Bay rose to 2nd place in the NFC North, only a half game behind the Chicago Bears. This was also the first time since 1989 that the Packers beat the Cowboys in Dallas, ending a 9-game losing streak at Dallas against the Cowboys.

==== Week 16: vs. Pittsburgh Steelers ====
Week Sixteen: Pittsburgh Steelers at Green Bay Packers – Game summary

Quarter	1	2	3	4	Total
Steelers	7	3	21	7	38
Packers	7	7	7	10	31

at Lambeau Field, Green Bay, Wisconsin

- Date: December 22
- Game time: 3:25 pm. CST
- Game weather: 21 °F (−6 °C), (Snow)
- Game attendance: 77,999
- Referee: Carl Cheffers
- TV announcers (CBS): Kevin Harlan and Solomon Wilcots
- Recap, Game book

Game information

First quarter

- GB – Jarrett Boykin 5-yard pass from Matt Flynn (Mason Crosby kick), 4:02. Packers 7–0. Drive: 13 plays, 87 yards, 5:19.
- PIT – Emmanuel Sanders 1-yard pass from Ben Roethlisberger (Shaun Suisham kick), 0:01. Tied 7–7. Drive: 7 plays, 73 yards, 4:01.

Second quarter

- GB – Eddie Lacy 14-yard run (Mason Crosby kick), 1:53. Packers 14–7. Drive: 7 plays, 71 yards, 2:49.
- PIT – Shaun Suisham 31-yard field goal, 0:02. Packers 14–10. Drive: 8 plays, 32 yards, 1:51.

Third quarter

- PIT – Ben Roethlisberger 13-yard run (Shaun Suisham kick), 11:51. Steelers 17–14. Drive: 6 plays, 75 yards, 3:09.
- GB – Eddie Lacy 2-yard run (Mason Crosby kick), 5:19. Packers 21–17. Drive: 4 plays, 3 yards, 1:07.
- PIT – Matt Spaeth 11-yard pass from Ben Roethlisberger (Shaun Suisham kick), 1:55. Steelers 24–21. Drive: 6 plays, 68 yards, 3:24.
- PIT – Cortez Allen 40-yard interception return (Shaun Suisham kick), 1:37. Steelers 31–21.

Fourth quarter

- GB – Mason Crosby 22-yard field goal, 12:04. Steelers 31–24. Drive: 6 plays, 19 yards, 2:56.
- GB – John Kuhn 1-yard run (Mason Crosby kick), 7:14. Tied 31–31. Drive: 6 plays, 58 yards, 3:13.
- PIT – Le'Veon Bell 1-yard run (Shaun Suisham kick), 1:25. Steelers 38–31. Drive: 5 plays, 17 yards, 0:26.

Top passers

- PIT – Ben Roethlisberger – 16/28, 167 yards, 2 TD, INT
- GB – Matt Flynn – 21/39, 232 yards, TD, INT

Top rushers

- PIT – Le'Veon Bell – 26 rushes, 124 yards, TD
- GB – Eddie Lacy – 15 rushes, 84 yards, 2 TD

Top receivers

- PIT – Antonio Brown – 6 receptions, 105 yards
- GB – James Jones – 9 receptions, 84 yards

Following the Packers miraculous 37–36 comeback win against the Dallas Cowboys, the Packers returned to snowy Lambeau Field to take on the Pittsburgh Steelers for the first time since Super Bowl XLV. Once again, Aaron Rodgers was inactive and Matt Flynn got the start. The two teams traded touchdowns in the first quarter, and Eddie Lacy ran 14 yards for a touchdown at the 2-minute warning. Pittsburgh responded with a 31-yard field goal to make it 10–14 at halftime. In the 3rd quarter, both teams once again traded touchdowns to make it 17–21. Pittsburgh then took the lead with an 11-yard touchdown pass to Matt Spaeth. On the Packers' next drive, Matt Flynn collided with Andrew Quarless, disrupting a pass that was intercepted and returned 40 yards for a touchdown by Cortez Allen to extend their lead 31–21. In the 4th quarter, The Packers managed to tie the game with a 22-yard field goal and a 1-yard run by John Kuhn. With a little less than 3 minutes remaining, Troy Polamalu forced a Matt Flynn fumble at the Packers 17. The Steelers took a 38–31 lead with a 1-yard touchdown run from Le'Veon Bell. After a 70-yard kick return by Micah Hyde, the Packers were at the Steelers 31-yard line with 1:25 remaining. 3 plays later they reached the Steelers 1-yard line. However, a false start penalty both pushed them back 5 yards and ran 10 seconds off the clock, leaving the Packers with one play to get into the endzone. On the final play, Matt Flynn's pass for Jarrett Boykin was incomplete and time expired. With the 38–31 loss, The Packers fell to 7-7-1 and their playoff hopes rested on the outcomes of the games played by the Detroit Lions (7-7) and the Chicago Bears (8-6). Detroit lost to the New York Giants 23–20 in OT and was eliminated from playoff contention. Meanwhile, Chicago had an opportunity to clinch the NFC North division with a win over the Eagles on Sunday Night Football, but the Eagles beat the Bears 54–11. This set up a win-and-in matchup between Green Bay (7-7-1) and Chicago (8-7) the following week. The winner would obtain the 4th seed in the NFC playoffs and the loser would be eliminated from playoff contention. This would also be Green Bay's last home loss until week 10 in 2015 against Detroit.

==== Week 17: at Chicago Bears ====
Week Seventeen: Green Bay Packers at Chicago Bears – Game summary

Quarter	1	2	3	4	Total
Packers	0	13	7	13	33
Bears	7	0	14	7	28

at Soldier Field, Chicago, Illinois

- Date: December 29
- Game time: 3:25 pm. CST
- Game weather: 26 °F (−3 °C), rain/snow mix
- Game attendance: 62,708
- Referee: Clete Blakeman
- TV announcers (Fox): Joe Buck, Troy Aikman and Pam Oliver
- Recap, Game book

Game information

First quarter

- CHI – Matt Forte 4-yard pass from Jay Cutler (Robbie Gould kick), 2:07. Bears 7–0. Drive: 8 plays, 80 yards, 3:36.

Second quarter

- GB – Mason Crosby 33-yard field goal, 7:59. Bears 7–3. Drive: 10 plays, 49 yards, 4:46.
- GB – Jarrett Boykin 15-yard fumble return (Mason Crosby kick), 3:28. Packers 10–7. Drive: 6 plays, 41 yards, 2:41.
- GB – Mason Crosby 27-yard field goal, 0:02. Packers 13–7. Drive: 7 plays, 19 yards, 1:45.

Third quarter

- CHI – Matt Forte 5-yard run (Robbie Gould kick), 10:46. Bears 14–13. Drive: 5 plays, 30 yards, 2:32.
- GB – Randall Cobb 7-yard pass from Aaron Rodgers (Mason Crosby kick), 7:27. Packers 20–14. Drive: 7 plays, 80 yards, 3:19.
- CHI – Matt Forte 1-yard run (Robbie Gould kick), 5:04. Bears 21–20. Drive: 4 plays, 74 yards, 2:23.

Fourth quarter

- CHI – Brandon Marshall 5-yard pass from Jay Cutler (Robbie Gould kick), 14:55. Bears 28–20. Drive: 7 plays, 68 yards, 3:32.
- GB – Eddie Lacy 6-yard run (Mason Crosby kick), 11:38. Bears 28–27. Drive: 6 plays, 77 yards, 3:17.
- GB – Randall Cobb 48-yard pass from Aaron Rodgers (pass failed), 0:38. Packers 33–28. Drive: 15 plays, 87 yards, 5:46.

Top passers

- GB – Aaron Rodgers – 25/39, 318 yards, 2 TD, 2 INT
- CHI – Jay Cutler – 15/24, 226 yards, 2 TD, INT

Top rushers

- GB – James Starks – 11 rushes, 88 yards
- CHI – Matt Forte – 22 rushes, 110 yards, 2 TD

Top receivers

- GB – Jordy Nelson – 10 receptions, 161 yards
- CHI – Alshon Jeffery – 3 receptions, 80 yards

Following the Packers' 38–31 loss to the Steelers and Chicago's 54–11 loss to the Eagles, both Green Bay (7-7-1) and Chicago (8-7) met at Soldier Field in week 17 to compete for the NFC North Championship. The NFC North Champion would enter the NFC playoffs as the 4th seed, while the other team will be eliminated from playoff contention. Three days prior to the game on Dec. 26, Packers head coach Mike McCarthy announced that Packers QB Aaron Rodgers (collarbone) was cleared to play against the Bears, as well as RB Eddie Lacy (ankle) and WR Randall Cobb (leg), who was activated after staying on IR with designation to return for the past 9 weeks. After forcing a Bears 3-and-out, Aaron Rodgers and the Packers established a 14-play, 75-yard drive that took 7:30 minutes. On 3rd and goal at the Chicago 5, Aaron Rodgers threw an interception to Chris Conte in the endzone. Jay Cutler and the Bears took advantage with a drive that featured a 37-yard pass to Brandon Marshall and was capped off by a 4-yard touchdown pass to Matt Forte. Early in the 2nd quarter, Aaron Rodgers threw another interception, this time to Tim Jennings at the Chicago 21-yard line. After forcing a 3-and-out, the Packers drove to the Chicago 15 and scored on a 33-yard field goal to make it 3–7. The Packers defense held Chicago to another three-and-out, and Green Bay had great field position at the Chicago 41. 6 plays later, Julius Peppers forced an Aaron Rodgers fumble that was recovered by Jarrett Boykin and run in 15 yards for a touchdown. Many players initially believed that it was an incomplete pass, but instant replay upheld the call since Rodgers' hand was empty as he propelled it forward. After the two-minute warning, A. J. Hawk forced an Alshon Jeffery fumble that was recovered and returned to the Chicago 28. The Packers offense could not find the endzone in the final seconds of the 1st half, so they settled for a 27-yard field goal and a 13–7 lead at halftime.

Early in the 3rd quarter, Devin Hester returned a punt 49 yards to the Packers 30 and Matt Forte scored on a 5-yard run to take a 14–13 lead. Four plays into Green Bay's next drive, James Starks scampered for a 41-yard gain and three plays after that Aaron Rodgers threw a 7-yard touchdown pass to Randall Cobb to retake the lead at 20–14. Chicago quickly answered with a 1-yard touchdown run by Matt Forte following a 67-yard pass to Alshon Jeffery. On the Packers' next possession, an 18-yard pass to Andrew Quarless was overruled to be an incomplete pass. Instant replay suggested there was insubstantial evidence to overturn the call, as the tip of the football disappeared between Quarless' forearms and the ground. Therefore, it remained an incomplete pass and the Packers had to punt. On the Bears' drive, Cutler completed a 33-yard pass to Matt Forte. On 3rd and goal, Cutler threw a 5-yard touchdown pass to Brandon Marshall to take a 28–20 lead at the start of the 4th quarter. However, Green Bay quickly struck back with a 6-yard touchdown run by Eddie Lacy to make it 27–28 with 11:38 remaining in the 4th quarter. After fair-catching a punt at the Green Bay 13 with 6:24 remaining, Green Bay steadily drove to the Chicago 48 in 14 plays, converting two 4th downs in the process. The Packers found themselves on 4th down & 8 with 43 seconds remaining. On the play, Aaron Rodgers side-stepped a 7-man blitz led by Bears defensive end Julius Peppers and threw a 48-yard touchdown to a wide open Randall Cobb to take a 33–28 lead with 38 seconds remaining. John Kuhn's cut-block on Peppers gave Rodgers enough room to move to his left and find Cobb. Green Bay failed on the two-point conversion, so Chicago attempted to make one more comeback. After Devin Hester's kickoff return and Martellus Bennett's 15-yard catch, the Bears were at the Green Bay 45-yard line with 24 seconds remaining. On 1st down, Morgan Burnett deflected a Hail Mary pass intended for Alshon Jeffery. On 2nd down, Brandon Marshall dropped Cutler's pass at the 27-yard line. On 3rd down with 10 seconds remaining, Cutler attempted another Hail Mary pass intended for Brandon Marshall, but it was intercepted by Sam Shields as time expired. With the 33–28 win, the Green Bay Packers (8-7-1) won their 3rd consecutive NFC North Championship and enter the 2013–14 NFC playoffs as the 4th seed.

The Packers became the only NFC team that clinched their division in the previous season to do so again this season. The game was identified as one of the greatest sports moments in Wisconsin history.

=== Postseason ===
==== NFC Wild Card Playoff Game: vs. #5 San Francisco 49ers ====
NFC Wild Card Playoff Game: #5 San Francisco 49ers at #4 Green Bay Packers – Game summary

Quarter	1	2	3	4	Total
49ers	6	7	0	10	23
Packers	0	10	0	10	20

at Lambeau Field, Green Bay, Wisconsin

- Date: January 5, 2014
- Game time: 3:40 p.m. CST
- Game weather: 5 °F (−15 °C), mostly cloudy wind chill -10
- Game attendance: 77,525
- Referee: Ed Hochuli
- TV announcers (Fox): Joe Buck, Troy Aikman, Pam Oliver and Erin Andrews
- Recap, Game book

Game information

First quarter

- SF – Phil Dawson 22-yard field goal, 9:00. 49ers 3–0. Drive: 13 plays, 69 yards, 4:28.
- SF – Phil Dawson 25-yard field goal, 2:17. 49ers 6–0. Drive: 11 plays, 42 yards, 4:49.

Second quarter

- GB – Jordy Nelson 5-yard pass from Aaron Rodgers (Mason Crosby kick), 5:50. Packers 7–6. Drive: 14 plays, 70 yards, 7:18.
- SF – Frank Gore 10-yard run (Phil Dawson kick), 2:48. 49ers 13–7. Drive: 5 plays, 68 yards, 3:02.
- GB – Mason Crosby 34-yard field goal, 0:00. 49ers 13–10. Drive: 9 plays, 59 yards, 2:48.

Third quarter

- No scoring plays.

Fourth quarter

- GB – John Kuhn 1-yard run (Mason Crosby kick), 12:06. Packers 17–13. Drive: 12 plays, 80 yards, 6:13.
- SF – Vernon Davis 28-yard pass from Colin Kaepernick (Phil Dawson kick), 10:31. 49ers 20–17. Drive: 4 plays, 63 yards, 1:35.
- GB – Mason Crosby 24-yard field goal, 5:06. Tied 20–20. Drive: 11 plays, 61 yards, 5:25.
- SF – Phil Dawson 33-yard field goal, 0:00. 49ers 23–20. Drive: 14 plays, 65 yards, 5:06.

Top passers

- SF – Colin Kaepernick – 16/30, 227 yards, TD, INT
- GB – Aaron Rodgers – 17/26, 177 yards, TD

Top rushers

- SF – Colin Kaepernick – 7 rushes, 98 yards
- GB – Eddie Lacy – 21 rushes, 81 yards

Top receivers

- SF – Michael Crabtree – 8 receptions, 125 yards
- GB – Jordy Nelson – 7 receptions, 62 yards, TD

== Standings ==
=== Division ===
NFC North
	W	L	T	PCT	DIV	CONF	PF	PA	STK
^{(4)} Green Bay Packers	8	7	1	.531	3–2–1	6–5–1	417	428	W1
Chicago Bears	8	8	0	.500	2–4	4–8	445	478	L2
Detroit Lions	7	9	0	.438	4–2	6–6	395	376	L4
Minnesota Vikings	5	10	1	.344	2–3–1	4–7–1	391	480	W1

=== Conference ===
NFC
#	Team	Division	W	L	T	PCT	DIV	CONF	SOS	SOV	STK
Division winners
1	Seattle Seahawks	West	13	3	0	.813	4–2	10–2	.490	.445	W1
2	Carolina Panthers	South	12	4	0	.750	5–1	9–3	.494	.451	W3
3	Philadelphia Eagles	East	10	6	0	.625	4–2	9–3	.453	.391	W2
4	Green Bay Packers	North	8	7	1	.531	3–2–1	6–5–1	.453	.371	W1
Wild cards
5	San Francisco 49ers	West	12	4	0	.750	5–1	9–3	.494	.414	W6
6	New Orleans Saints	South	11	5	0	.688	5–1	9–3	.516	.455	W1
Did not qualify for the postseason
7	Arizona Cardinals	West	10	6	0	.625	2–4	6–6	.531	.444	L1
8 (Note: Chicago defeated Dallas head-to-head (Week 14, 45–28).)	Chicago Bears	North	8	8	0	.500	2–4	4–8	.465	.469	L2
9	Dallas Cowboys	East	8	8	0	.500	5–1	7–5	.484	.363	L1
10 (Note: The NY Giants and Detroit finished with a better conference record than St. Louis.) (Note: The NY Giants defeated Detroit head-to-head (Week 16, 23–20 (OT)).)	New York Giants	East	7	9	0	.438	3–3	6–6	.520	.366	W2
11 (Note: Detroit finished with a better conference record than St. Louis.)	Detroit Lions	North	7	9	0	.438	4–2	6–6	.457	.402	L4
12	St. Louis Rams	West	7	9	0	.438	1–5	4–8	.551	.446	L1
13	Minnesota Vikings	North	5	10	1	.344	2–3–1	4–7–1	.512	.450	W1
14 (Note: Atlanta finished with a better conference record than Tampa Bay.)	Atlanta Falcons	South	4	12	0	.250	1–5	3–9	.553	.313	L2
15	Tampa Bay Buccaneers	South	4	12	0	.250	1–5	2–10	.574	.391	L3
16	Washington Redskins	East	3	13	0	.188	0–6	1–11	.516	.438	L8
Tiebreakers (Note: When breaking ties for three or more teams under the NFL's rules, they are first broken within divisions, then comparing only the highest-ranked remaining team from each division.)

== Statistics ==
=== Regular season statistical leaders ===
	Player(s)	Value
Passing yards	Aaron Rodgers	2,536
Passing touchdowns	Aaron Rodgers	17
Rushing yards	Eddie Lacy	1,178
Rushing touchdowns	Eddie Lacy	11
Receptions	Jordy Nelson	85
Receiving yards	Jordy Nelson	1,314
Receiving touchdowns	Jordy Nelson	8
Points	Mason Crosby	141
Kickoff return yards	Micah Hyde	531
Punt return yards	Micah Hyde	296
Tackles	A. J. Hawk	118
Sacks	Clay Matthews III	7.5
Interceptions	Sam Shields	4
