= Nick Perry (linebacker) =

American football player (born 1990)

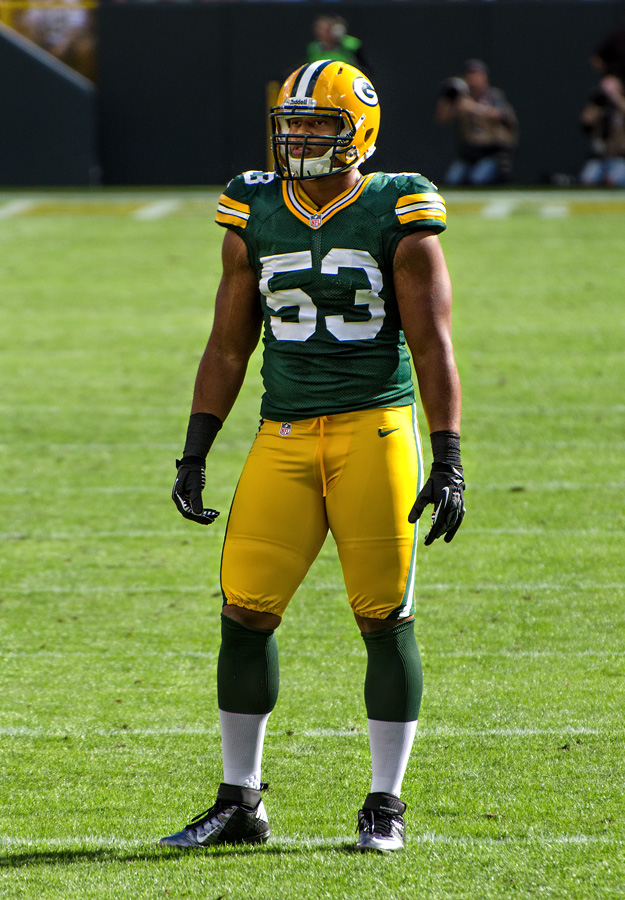
- Perry with the Green Bay Packers in 2012

No. 53
- Position: Linebacker

Personal information
- Born: April 12, 1990 (age 36); Detroit, Michigan, U.S.
- Listed height: 6 ft 3 in (1.91 m)
- Listed weight: 265 lb (120 kg)

Career information
- High school: Martin Luther King (Detroit)
- College: USC (2008–2011)
- NFL draft: 2012: 1st round, 28th overall pick

Career history
- Green Bay Packers (2012–2018)

Awards and highlights
- Freshman All-American (2009); First-team All-Pac-12 (2011)

Career NFL statistics
- Total tackles: 213
- Sacks: 32.0
- Pass deflections: 11
- Interceptions: 1
- Forced fumbles: 7
- Stats at Pro Football Reference

Nicholas Joel Perry (born April 12, 1990) is an American former professional football player who was a linebacker for seven seasons in the National Football League (NFL) with the Green Bay Packers. He played college football for the USC Trojans. Perry was selected by the Packers in the first round of the 2012 NFL draft.

== Early life ==
Detroit native, Nick Perry attended Mackenzie High School for most of his prep career; when Mackenzie was shuttered in 2007, Perry transferred to Martin Luther King High School for his senior season. During his Junior year in 2006, Perry was named to the All-metro and All-city teams while getting 75 tackles and 11 sacks. His senior year also brought great success as he played at defensive end, and Tight End. He recorded 147 tackles and a Michigan Record 36 Sacks. He also caught 14 passes for 310 yards and eight touchdowns. He received numerous honors including being named to the USA today All-USA First-team, Scout.com All-American second-team, Super Prep All-Midwest, Prep-Star All Midwest, All-State and Detroit News All-Detroit and the Dream Team "MVP." He Also participated in the 2008 U.S. Army All-American Bowl.

== College career ==
Perry was listed at 6'4" and weighed in at 235 pounds coming out of King High School. He ran a 4.51 forty-yard dash, bench pressed 315 pounds, and squatted 400 pounds. He finished with a 3.3 Grade point average and received scholarship offers from Miami, Michigan, Michigan State, and USC. He ultimately decided to play at USC.

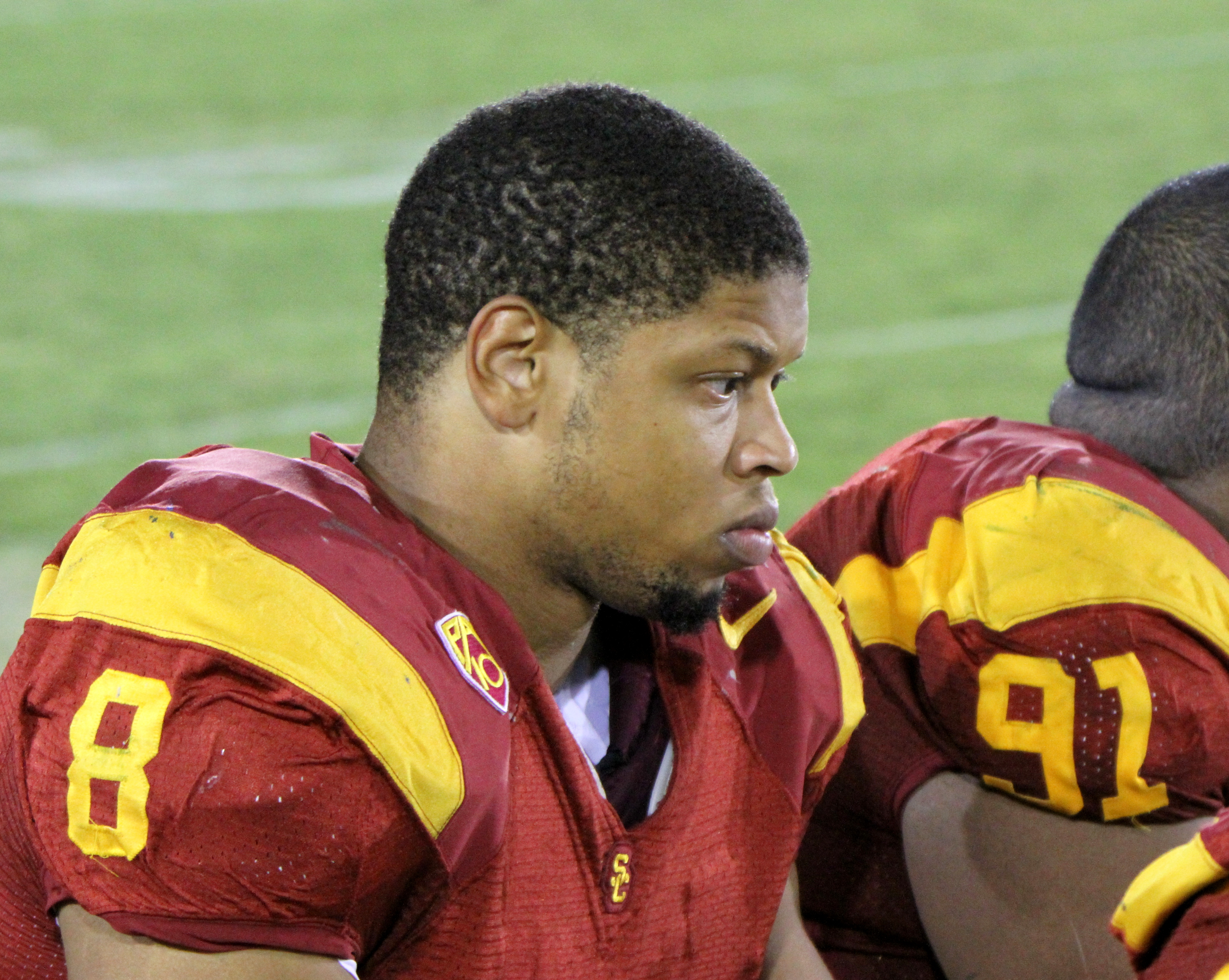
Perry following USC's game against Oregon in 2010.

During his freshman year in 2008, Perry was redshirted as a defensive end.

Perry came on to the scene in 2009 mainly as a backup defensive end playing mostly in passing situations. He appeared in 13 games and made his first start against Stanford Cardinal in a 55–21 defeat. He had 24 tackles, nine for a loss, with a team best nine sacks. His performance had him named to the 2009 Football Writers Freshman All-American first-team.

Perry started nine games in his sophomore season in 2010, and saw action as a backup in others. He appeared in a total of 12 games, but missed the opener against The Hawaii Warriors with a sprained ankle. During this season he had 25 tackles with 7.5 of them for a loss. He also recorded four sacks, forced two fumbles, and recovered one.

During his final season as a Trojan in 2011, Perry recorded 54 tackles over 12 games, with 13 for a loss along with 8.5 sacks.

== Professional career ==
=== Pre-draft ===
On December 16, 2011, Perry announced his decision to forgo his remaining eligibility and enter the 2012 NFL draft. Due to Perry's size, many scouts viewed him be a bit small to be a defensive end and projected him to be better suited to play outside linebacker in a 3–4 defense. Perry stated he'd prefer to stay at defensive end. He attended pre-draft visits with multiple teams, including the New England Patriots, Pittsburgh Steelers, Jacksonville Jaguars, and Cleveland Browns. Perry also attended a private workout with the Baltimore Ravens. At the conclusion of the pre-draft process, Perry was projected to be a first or second round pick by NFL draft experts and scouts. He was ranked as the fourth best defensive end prospect in the draft by DraftScout.com, was ranked as the fourth best edge rusher by NFL analyst Gil Brandt, and was ranked as the sixth best defensive end by NFL analyst Mike Mayock.

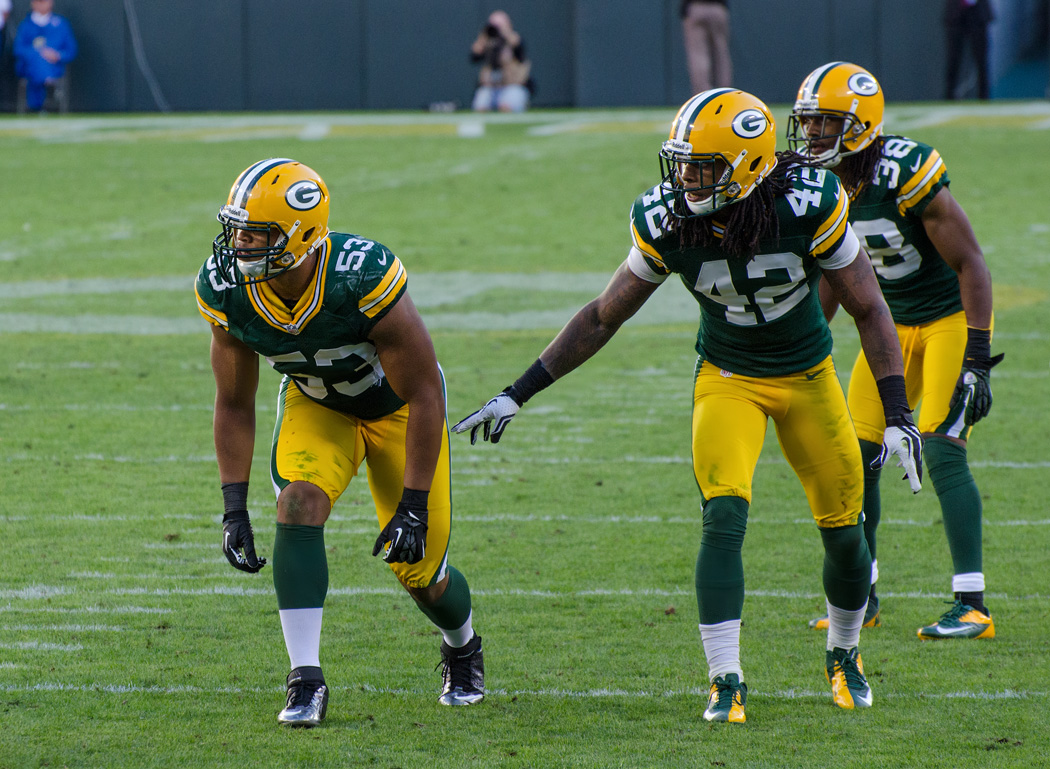
Nick Perry with Morgan Burnett and Tramon Williams.

Pre-draft measurables
Height	Weight	Arm length	Hand span	Wingspan	40-yard dash	10-yard split	20-yard split	20-yard shuttle	Three-cone drill	Vertical jump	Broad jump	Bench press
6 ft 2 3/4 in (1.90 m)	271 lb (123 kg)	33 in (0.84 m)	9 1/2 in (0.24 m)	6 ft 5 7/8 in (1.98 m)	4.64 s	1.58 s	2.65 s	4.66 s	7.25 s	38.5 in (0.98 m)	10 ft 4 in (3.15 m)	35 reps
All values from NFL Combine

=== 2012 ===
The Green Bay Packers selected Perry in the first round (28th overall) of the 2012 NFL draft. Perry was the fourth linebacker drafted in 2012. On May 12, 2012 the Packers signed Perry to a four-year, $7.5 million contract that includes a signing bonus of $4 million.

Throughout training camp, Perry competed against Erik Walden to be the starting right outside linebacker. Head coach Mike McCarthy named Perry and Clay Matthews III the starting outside linebackers to begin the regular season. They started alongside inside linebackers A. J. Hawk and D. J. Smith.

He made his professional regular season debut in the Green Bay Packers’ season-opener against the San Francisco 49ers and collected a season-high eight combined tackles during their 30–22 loss. Perry injured his wrist during the game, but elected to play through the injury. On September 24, 2012, Perry recorded four combined tackles and made his first career sack as the Packers lost 14–12 at the Seattle Seahawks in Week 3. Perry sacked Seahawks’ quarterback Russell Wilson for a 19-yard loss during the third quarter. In Week 6, Perry injured his knee during a 42–24 win at the Houston Texans and was inactive for the next three games (Weeks 7–9). On November 6, 2012, Perry underwent surgery on his wrist after injuring it in Week 1. The Green Bay Packers placed Perry in injured reserve the following day. He finished his rookie season in 2012 with 18 combined tackles (13 solo), two sacks, and one pass deflection in six games and five starts.

=== 2013 ===
Perry entered training camp slated as the starting weakside linebacker. Head coach Mike McCarthy retained Perry and Clay Matthews as the starting outside linebackers to start the season. On October 6, 2013, Perry recorded a season-high five solo tackles and sacked Lions’ quarterback Matthew Stafford twice during a 22–9 win against the Detroit Lions in Week 5. The following week, he made four combined tackles and one sack as the Packers defeated the Baltimore Ravens 19–17 in Week 6. Unfortunately, Perry fractured his foot during the game and was sidelined for the next three games (Week 7–9). Perry returned in Week 10, but subsequently missed the next two games after aggravating his foot injury (Weeks 11–12). Perry had slightly more success in 2013, playing in 11 games, starting in 6 of them, and recording four sacks and forcing three fumbles.

The Green Bay Packers finished first in the NFC North with an 8–7–1 record and earned a playoff berth. On January 5, 2014, Perry appeared in his first career playoff game and recorded five combined tackles and one sack during a 23–20 loss to the San Francisco 49ers during the NFC Wildcard Game.

=== 2014 ===
Throughout training camp, Perry competed against Julius Peppers and Mike Neal to be a starting outside linebacker. Head coach Mike McCarthy named Perry a backup outside linebacker to start the regular season, behind Clay Matthews III and Julius Peppers. In Week 5, Perry recorded three combined tackles and made a season-high two sacks on Vikings’ quarterback Christian Ponder during a 42–10 victory against the Minnesota Vikings. Perry was inactive for the Packers’ a Week 12 victory at the Minnesota Vikings due to a shoulder injury. He finished the 2014 NFL season with 22 combined tackles (16 solo), three sacks, one pass deflection, and one forced fumble in 15 games and four starts.

The Green Bay Packers finished atop the NFC North with a 12–4 record and earned a first round bye. On January 11, 2015, Perry recorded four combined tackles and made 1.5 sacks during a 26–21 victory against the Dallas Cowboys during the NFC Divisional Round. The following week, Perry started his first career playoff game and made four combined tackles as the Packers lost 28–22 at the Seattle Seahawks during the NFC Championship Game.

=== 2015 ===
On May 4, 2015, the Green Bay Packers officially declined to exercise the fifth-year option on Perry's rookie contract. As a result, Perry would become an unrestricted free agent after the 2015 NFL season. Throughout training camp, Perry competed against Mike Neal to be a starting outside linebacker. The role became available after defensive coordinator Dom Capers elected to move Clay Matthews to inside linebacker. Head coach Mike McCarthy named Perry a backup outside linebacker to begin the regular season, behind Julius Peppers and Mike Neal.

In Week 4, he made two solo tackles and a season-high two sacks during a 17–3 victory at the San Francisco 49ers. Perry was inactive for the Packers’ Week 6 victory against the San Diego Chargers. In Week 9, he collected a season-high seven combined tackles during a 37–29 loss at the Carolina Panthers. He was sidelined for the Packers’ Week 14 victory against the Dallas Cowboys after aggravating his shoulder injury. Perry finished the 2015 NFL season with 31 combined tackles (16 solo), 3.5 sacks, one pass deflection, and one forced fumble in 14 games and one start.

The Green Bay Packers finished second in the NFC North with a 10–6 record and earned a wildcard berth. On January 10, 2016, Perry recorded four combined tackles and made 2.5 sacks during a 35–18 win at the Washington Redskins during the NFC Wildcard Game. The following game, the Packers were eliminated from the playoffs after losing 26–20 at the Arizona Cardinals during the NFC Divisional Round. Perry recorded four combined tackles and one sack during the game. His 3.5 sacks that postseason tied the franchise record held by Clay Matthews.

=== 2016 ===
On March 11, 2016, the Green Bay Packers signed Perry to a one-year, $5.05 million contract that includes a signing bonus of $1.50 million. Perry entered training camp slated as a backup outside linebacker, but began competing against Julius Peppers for a starting role. Head coach Mike McCarthy named Perry and Clay Matthews III the starting outside linebackers to start the season. They started alongside inside linebackers Jake Ryan and Blake Martinez.

External videos
- Nick Perry brings pressure and sacks Kirk Cousins
- Nick Perry sacks Sam Bradford to end the game
- Matt Barkley picked off by Nick Perry

In Week 3, Perry collected a season-high seven combined tackles, made a pass deflection, and made a season-high two sacks on Lions’ quarterback Matthew Stafford during a 34–27 win against the Detroit Lions. On October 20, 2016, Perry made four combined tackles, a pass deflection, a sack, and his first career interception during the Packers’ 26–10 victory against the Chicago Bears in Week 7. Perry intercepted a pass by Bears’ quarterback Matt Barkley, that was originally intended for running back Jordan Howard, to seal the Packers’ victory at the end of the fourth quarter. Perry was inactive for two games (Weeks 14–15) due to a significant hand injury. Upon returning from injury, he was demoted to backup outside linebacker behind Julius Peppers. He finished the 2016 NFL season with 52 combined tackles (35 solo), a career-high 11 sacks, four pass deflections, and one interception in 14 games and 12 starts.

The Green Bay Packers finished first in the NFC North with a 10–6 record and earned a playoff berth. Perry remained a backup outside linebacker throughout the playoffs. The Green Bay Packers defeated the New York Giants 38–13 to win the NFC Wildcard Game. On January 15, 2017, Perry recorded four solo tackles, deflected a pass, and made a sack during a 34–31 win at the Dallas Cowboys in the NFC Divisional Round. The Packers were eliminated from the playoffs the following game after a 44–21 loss at the Atlanta Falcons during the NFC Championship Game.

=== 2017 ===
On March 9, 2017, the Green Bay Packers signed Perry to a five-year, $60 million contract that included a signing bonus of $18.50 million. Perry entered training camp slated as a starting outside linebacker after Julius Peppers departed in free agency.

External videos
- Dak Prescott sacked by Nick Perry
- Nick Perry knocks down pass from Dak Prescott

Perry was inactive for the Packers’ Week 3 victory against the Cincinnati Bengals due to a hand injury. On September 21, 2017, Green Bay Packers’ head coach Mike McCarthy announced that Perry would undergo surgery to repair his injured hand. On November 12, 2017, Perry collected a season-high six solo tackles and sacked Bears’ quarterback Mitch Trubisky three times during a 23–16 victory at the Chicago Bears in Week 10. Perry was sidelined for a Week 14 win at the Cleveland Browns and a Week 16 loss to the Minnesota Vikings due to injuries to his foot and shoulder. On December 30, 2017, the Green Bay Packers places Perry on injured reserve due to injuries to his ankle and shoulder. He finished the season with 38 combined tackles (23 solo), seven sacks, and one forced fumble in 12 games and 11 starts.

=== 2018 ===
External videos
- Nick Perry forces pivotal strip/sack on Trubisky

On January 1, 2018, the Green Bay Packers announced their decision to fire defensive coordinator Dom Capers. On January 10, 2018, the Green Bay Packers announced their decision to hire former Cleveland Browns’ head coach Mike Pettine as their new defensive coordinator. Pettine retained Perry and Clay Matthews III as the starting outside linebackers. In Week 3, he collected a season-high seven combined tackles during the Packers’ 31–17 loss at the Washington Redskins. On November 24, 2018, the Green Bay Packers placed Perry on injured reserve due to a knee injury. He played in nine games in 2018, recording 24 tackles and 1.5 sacks. On December 3, 2018, the Green Bay Packers announced their decision to fire head coach Mike McCarthy after they fell to a 4–7–1 record.

On March 12, 2019, Perry was released by the Packers.

== NFL career statistics ==
=== Regular season ===
Year	Team	Games		Tackles					Interceptions						Fumbles	
Year	Team	GP	GS	Total	Solo	Ast	Sck	SFTY	PDef	Int	Yds	Avg	Lng	TDs	FF	FR
2012	GB	6	5	18	13	5	2.0	0	1	0	0	0.0	0	0	0	0
2013	GB	11	6	28	20	8	4.0	0	1	0	0	0.0	0	0	3	0
2014	GB	15	4	22	16	6	3.0	0	1	0	0	0.0	0	0	1	1
2015	GB	14	1	31	16	15	3.5	0	1	0	0	0.0	0	0	1	0
2016	GB	14	12	52	35	17	11.0	0	4	1	0	0.0	0	0	0	0
2017	GB	12	11	38	23	15	7.0	0	0	0	0	0	0	0	1	1
2018	GB	9	9	24	15	9	1.5	0	3	0	0	0.0	0	0	1	0
Total		81	48	213	138	75	32.0	0	11	1	0	0.0	0	0	7	2
Source: NFL.com

=== Postseason ===
Year	Team	Games		Tackles					Interceptions						Fumbles	
Year	Team	GP	GS	Total	Solo	Ast	Sck	SFTY	PDef	Int	Yds	Avg	Lng	TDs	FF	FR
2013	GB	1	0	5	4	1	1.0	0	0	0	0	0.0	0	0	0	0
2014	GB	2	1	8	5	3	1.5	0	0	0	0	0.0	0	0	0	0
2015	GB	2	0	8	5	3	3.5	0	0	0	0	0.0	0	0	1	0
2016	GB	3	0	7	6	1	1.0	0	1	0	0	0.0	0	0	0	0
Total		8	1	28	20	8	7.0	0	1	0	0	0.0	0	0	1	0
Source: pro-football-reference.com
