= Eddie Lacy =

American football player (born 1990)

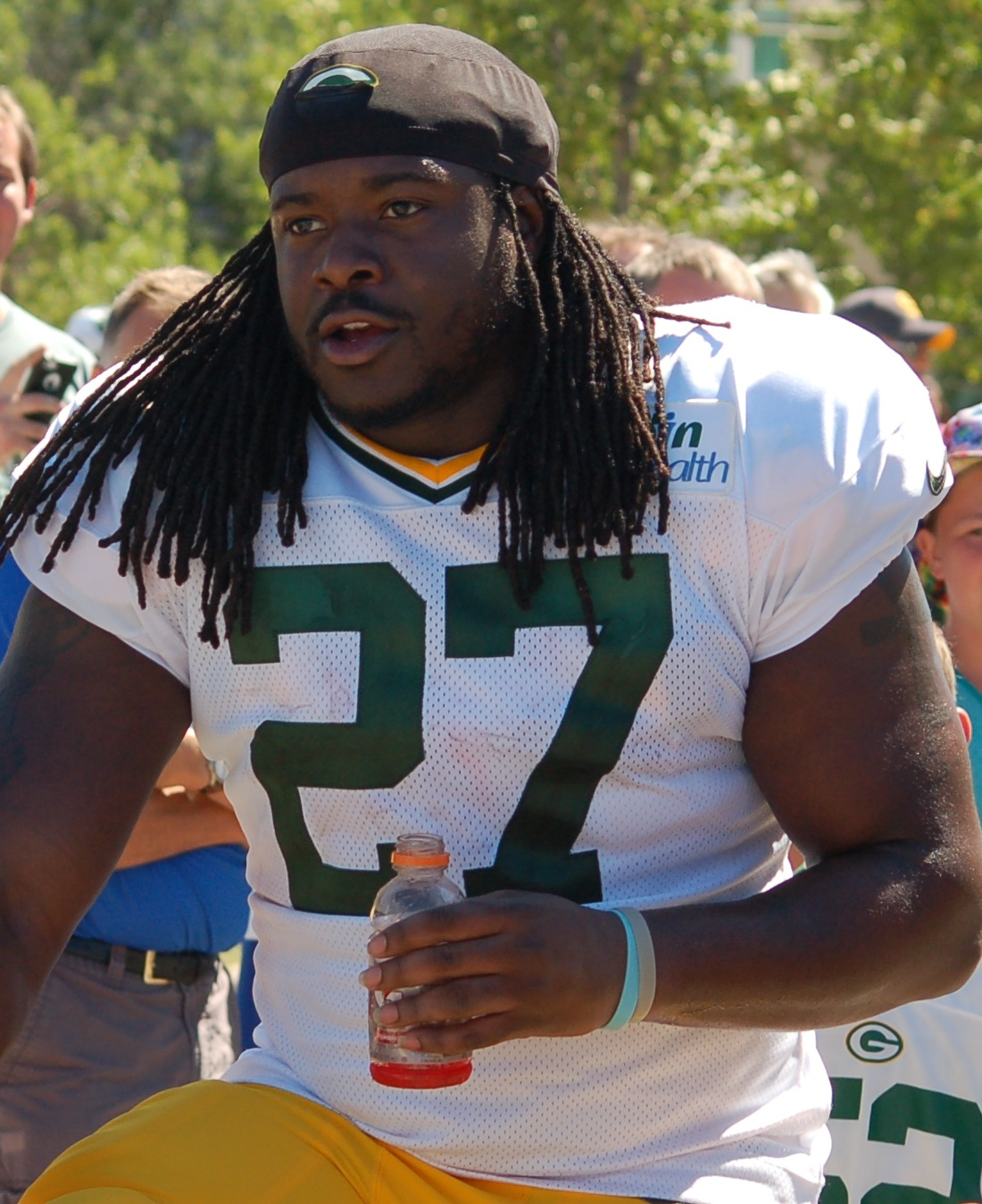
- Lacy with the Green Bay Packers in 2015

No. 27
- Position: Running back

Personal information
- Born: June 2, 1990 (age 36); Gretna, Louisiana, U.S.
- Listed height: 5 ft 11 in (1.80 m)
- Listed weight: 250 lb (113 kg)

Career information
- High school: Dutchtown (Geismar, Louisiana)
- College: Alabama (2009–2012)
- NFL draft: 2013: 2nd round, 61st overall pick

Career history
- Green Bay Packers (2013–2016); Seattle Seahawks (2017)

Awards and highlights
- NFL Offensive Rookie of the Year (2013); Second-team All-Pro (2013); Pro Bowl (2013); PFWA All-Rookie Team (2013); 3× BCS national champion (2009, 2011, 2012); First-team All-SEC (2012)

Career NFL statistics
- Rushing yards: 3,614
- Yards per carry: 4.2
- Rushing touchdowns: 23
- Receptions: 107
- Receiving yards: 947
- Receiving touchdowns: 6
- Stats at Pro Football Reference

Edward Darwin Lacy Jr. (born June 2, 1990) is an American former professional football player who was a running back in the National Football League (NFL). He played college football for the Alabama Crimson Tide, where he was a member of three BCS National Championship teams in the 2009, 2011, and 2012 seasons. He was selected by the Green Bay Packers in the second round of the 2013 NFL draft.

Lacy had a successful rookie season, being named Offensive Rookie of the Year, in addition to being a Pro Bowl and second team All-Pro selection. He remained the Packers' feature back for three more seasons, but his production dropped due to weight issues and injury. He signed with the Seattle Seahawks in 2017, with whom he played for one season in a crowded backfield.

== Early life ==
Lacy was born and raised in the New Orleans suburb of Gretna, Louisiana. His family was forced to evacuate his childhood home due to Hurricane Katrina, fleeing to Beaumont, Texas to stay with Lacy’s aunt. His family later relocated to the Baton Rouge, Louisiana area, where Lacy initially lived with nine other family members in a three-bedroom home, before Lacy, his parents, and his brothers settled in the nearby town of Geismar, Louisiana.

Lacy attended and graduated from Dutchtown High School, where he played high school football for the Griffins. He ran for 1,207 yards and 13 touchdowns as a sophomore, 34 touchdowns as a junior, and one touchdown during his injury-plagued senior season. In December 2008, he was selected by the Louisiana Sports Writers Association as a first-team player on the Class 5A All-State football team for the second consecutive season. Rated as the 13th best running back and the 116th best prospect overall by Rivals.com, Lacy committed to the University of Alabama in February 2009.

College recruiting
Name	Hometown	School	Height	Weight	40^{‡}	Commit date
Eddie Lacy; RB	Gretna, Louisiana	Dutchtown High School	5 ft 10.5 in (1.79 m)	225 lb (102 kg)	4.6	Feb 4, 2009
Eddie Lacy; RB	Recruit ratings: Scout: Rivals: 247Sports: (81)					
Overall recruit ranking: Scout: 24 (RB) Rivals: 13 (RB) 247Sports: 13 (RB) ESPN: 17 (RB)
Note: In many cases, Scout, Rivals, 247Sports, On3, and ESPN may conflict in their listings of height and weight.; In these cases, the average was taken. ESPN grades are on a 100-point scale.; Sources: "2009 Alabama Football Commits". Scout.; "Alabama Crimson Tide". ESPN.; "Scout.com Team Recruiting Rankings". Scout.

== College career ==
Lacy was a highly touted recruit coming out of Dutchtown High School. He accepted an athletic scholarship to attend the University of Alabama, where he played for coach Nick Saban's Alabama Crimson Tide football team from 2009 to 2012. Lacy won three BCS National Championships with the Crimson Tide in his collegiate career.

=== 2009 season ===
With the Crimson Tide having a lot of depth at the running back position, including future NFL running backs Mark Ingram II and Trent Richardson, Lacy was redshirted for his freshman year.

=== 2010 season ===
In 2010, Lacy earned his spot as the third-string tailback behind Ingram and Richardson. In the season opener against San Jose State, Lacy ran for 113 yards and two touchdowns in his collegiate debut. For the 2010 season, He finished with 406 yards rushing on 56 carries, an average of 7.25 yards per carry, and six touchdowns.

=== 2011 season ===
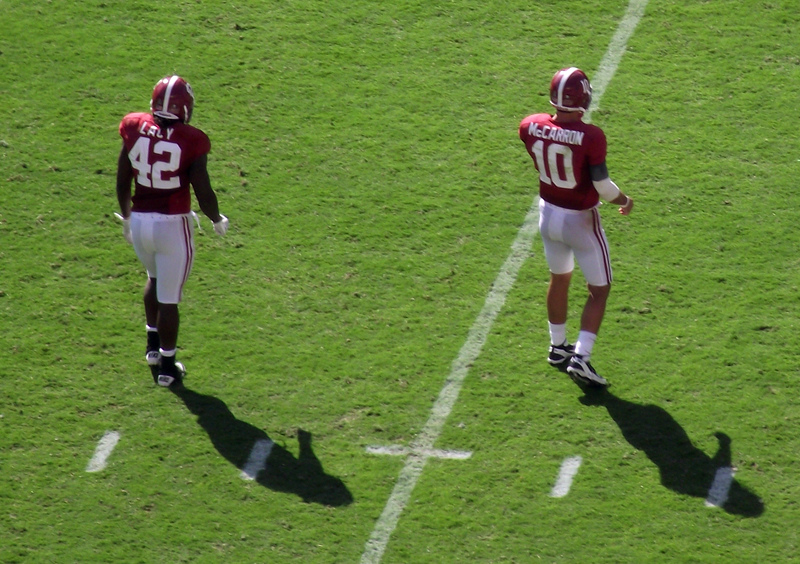
Lacy (left) with quarterback A. J. McCarron versus Arkansas

With Ingram departing for the NFL, Richardson and Lacy advanced to the No. 1 and No. 2 running back spots for the 2011 Alabama Crimson Tide football team. In the pre-season, those close to the program opined that "the Richardson-Eddie Lacy duo may put up bigger and better numbers and go down as the best duo in recent history." Backfield partner Richardson told reporters that Lacy's spin move is what separates him from other backs: "It's the nastiest spin move ever." The move has earned Lacy the nickname "Circle Button" based on the button on PlayStation's video games that triggers a spin move. Aaron Suttles of The Tuscaloosa News wrote, "To the fans, Eddie Lacy is a dreadlocked blur, spinning past defenders into the secondary. To his teammates, he's affectionately known as 'Circle Button.'"

In the 2011 season opener against Kent State, Lacy contributed 134 yards of offense, which were 76 receiving yards on three catches and 58 rushing yards on eight carries (an average of 7.3 yards per rushing carry). In the Tide's second game, Lacy rushed for 85 yards in Alabama's 27–11 win over Penn State. In the following game, Lacy rushed for 161 yards and two touchdowns on nine carries against North Texas. His 67-yard touchdown sprint in the fourth quarter was picked as Alabama's Play of the Week.

Against Arkansas, Lacy rushed for 61 yards and one touchdown on 13 carries. He sustained a foot injury against SEC West rival Arkansas and did not play the following week against Vanderbilt.

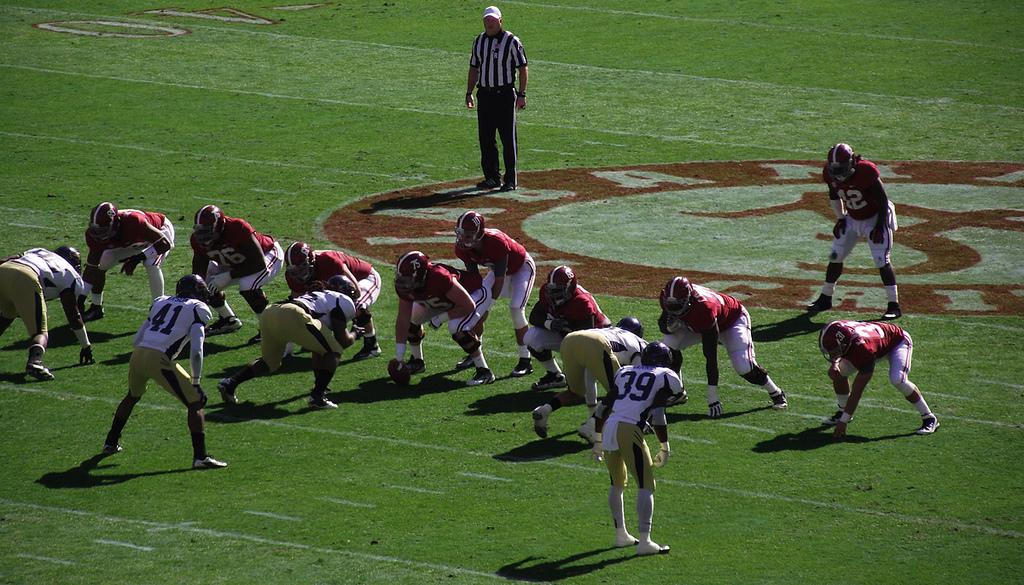
Lacy in the backfield

During the 2011 regular season, Lacy had 631 rushing yards and seven touchdowns. His average of 7.5 yards per carry ranked sixth among all players in the NCAA Division I Football Bowl Subdivision.

=== 2012 season ===
In 2012, he became the starting running back for Alabama after the departure of Trent Richardson to the NFL. His backup was true freshman T. J. Yeldon and both he and Yeldon finished the year with over 1,000 yards each. In the Arkansas game, he had 55 rushing yards and three rushing touchdowns. Against Missouri, he had 177 rushing yards and three rushing touchdowns. In the Iron Bowl against Auburn, he had 131 rushing yards and two rushing touchdowns in the victory. He finished the 2012 season rushing for 181 yards and two touchdowns in the 2012 SEC Championship Game and 140 yards and one rushing touchdown, as well as one receiving touchdown in the 2013 BCS Championship Game against Notre Dame. He was named the Offensive MVP for the BCS Championship game. Lacy finished the year with 1,322 rushing yards with 17 rushing touchdowns and two receiving touchdowns. On January 11, 2013, he decided to forego his final year and declared for the 2013 NFL draft.

== Professional career ==
=== Pre-draft ===
Lacy was one of the top running back prospects in the 2013 NFL draft, with a reputation for agility, strength, and ability to run through tackles.

External videos
- Lacy gets drafted by Green Bay

Pre-draft measurables
Height	Weight	Arm length	Hand span	Wingspan	40-yard dash	10-yard split	20-yard split	Three-cone drill	Vertical jump	Wonderlic
5 ft 11 in (1.80 m)	231 lb (105 kg)	31 in (0.79 m)	9 1/2 in (0.24 m)	6 ft 1 1/2 in (1.87 m)	4.64 s	1.65 s	2.65 s	7.33 s	33.5 in (0.85 m)	17
All values are from NFL Combine, except 40, cone drill, and vertical from Pro Day

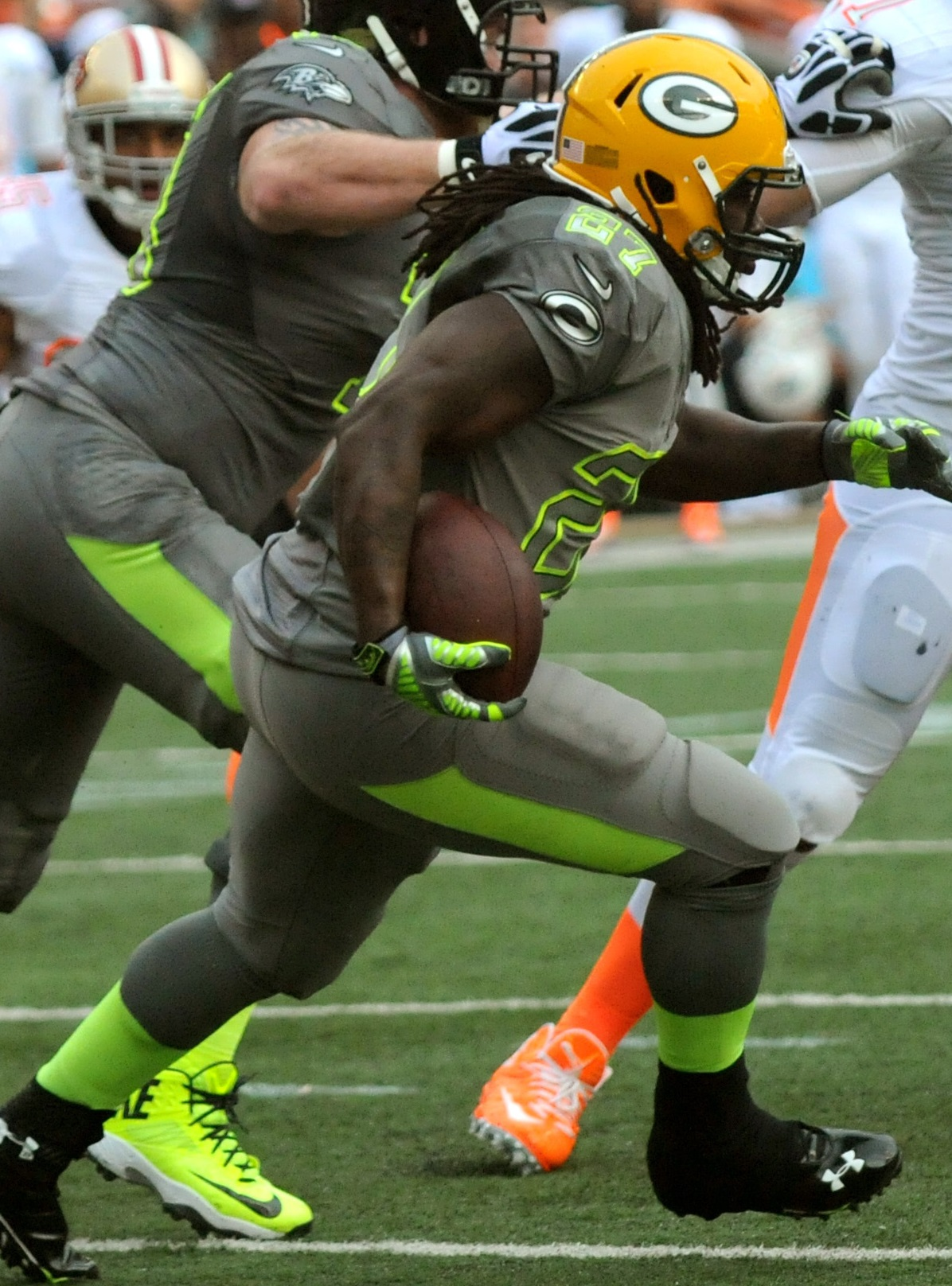
Lacy playing in the 2014 Pro Bowl after his rookie season.

=== Green Bay Packers ===
==== 2013 season ====
Lacy was selected in the second round (61st overall) by the Green Bay Packers in the 2013 NFL draft. He was the fourth running back to be selected in the 2013 NFL draft. In addition, he was the fourth of nine Alabama players to be selected that year. On May 30, 2013, he signed a contract with the Packers.

Lacy made his NFL debut against the San Francisco 49ers and had 41 rushing yards and a rushing touchdown. He suffered a concussion against Washington Redskins on September 15, 2013. He returned against the Detroit Lions on October 6, 2013. He later rushed for 100+ yards in four games. He had a career-high in rushing in a single game against the Chicago Bears, running for 150 yards on 22 carries with a 6.8 average. Lacy passed the 1,000-yd season mark on December 15 against the Dallas Cowboys when he ran for 141 yards and a touchdown on 21 carries. Lacy finished the season with an impressive 1,178 yards and 11 touchdowns with 257 receiving yards. He set the Packer rookie records for most rushing yards and touchdowns in a season. He was named AP-Second-team All-Pro and was named to the NFC Pro Bowl. The Packers made the playoffs with an 8–7–1 record. He was named to the PFWA All-Rookie Team. In the wild-card round against the San Francisco 49ers, he had 81 rushing yards in the 23–20 loss.

Lacy was selected as the 2013 Offensive Rookie of The Year, the first Packer chosen for the award since running back John Brockington in 1971. He was also the Packers' first 1,000 yard rusher since Ryan Grant in 2009. He was ranked 90th by his fellow players on the NFL Top 100 Players of 2014.

==== 2014 season ====
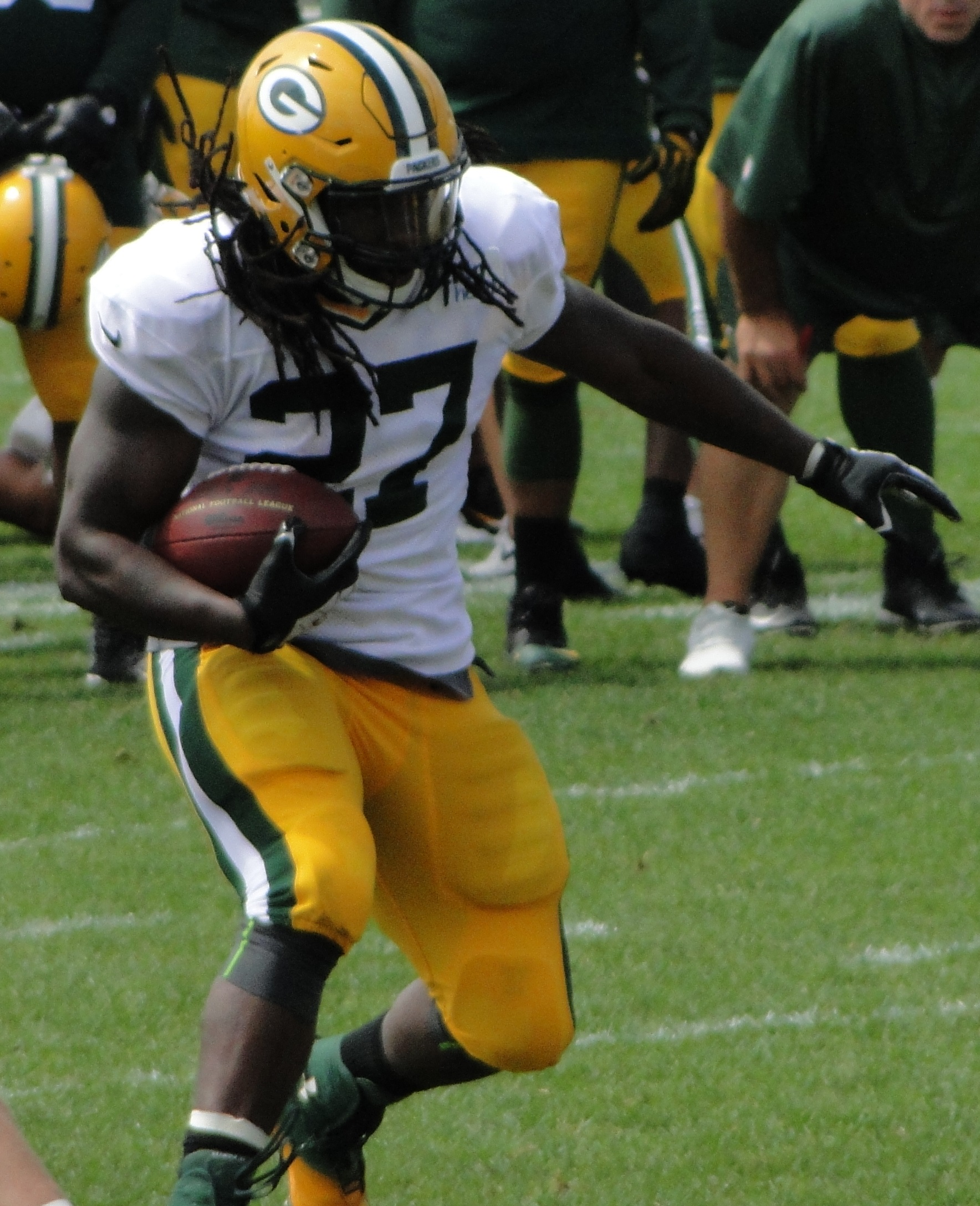
Lacy during the 2014 August training camp.

The Packers 2014 season opener was against the defending champion Seattle Seahawks where Lacy had 12 carries for 34 yards and three receptions for 11 yards. Lacy sustained a concussion during the game and left the game in the second half. Lacy had his first 100-yard game of the season in the fifth game of the season against the Minnesota Vikings, where he had 13 carries for 105 yards, two touchdowns, and also had three receptions for 27 yards in a 42–10 Packers win. In the second matchup against the Vikings, he had 125 rushing yards and a rushing touchdown to go along with two receptions for 13 yards and a receiving touchdown. In the season finale against the Detroit Lions, he had his third game of the season with at least 100 rushing yards.

After a slow start to the season, Lacy finished strong, ending the season with 1,139 yards rushing, with nine rushing touchdowns, averaging 4.6 yards per carry. Lacy became only the second Packer ever to rush for over 1,000 yards in his first two NFL seasons, joining John Brockington. In addition, Lacy caught 42 passes for 427 yards and four touchdowns.

The Packers earned a first-round bye for the playoffs. In the Divisional Round against the Dallas Cowboys, Lacy had 101 rushing yards in the 26–21 victory. In the NFC Championship, against the Seattle Seahawks, he had 73 rushing yards in the 28–22 overtime defeat. He was ranked 60th by his fellow players on the NFL Top 100 Players of 2015.

==== 2015 season ====
Lacy started the 2015 season with 85 rushing yards and a touchdown in a victory over the Chicago Bears. On September 20, he left Week 2's game against the Seattle Seahawks with an ankle injury and did not return. X-rays were negative on Lacy's injured ankle. The injury was classified as "minor." On November 8, Lacy left during the 3rd quarter with a groin injury in Week 9's game against the Carolina Panthers. On November 10, the Packers declared Lacy inactive for Week 10's matchup against the Detroit Lions. On December 2, Lacy missed the Packers' team curfew and his status was impacted for Week 13's matchup against the Detroit Lions. On December 13, he had 124 rushing yards and a rushing touchdown in the 28–7 win over the Dallas Cowboys. Overall, in the 2015 season, he finished with 758 rushing yards, three rushing touchdowns, 20 receptions, 188 receiving yards, and two receiving touchdowns.

The Packers made the playoffs and faced off against the Washington Redskins in the Wild Card Round. In the 35–18 victory, Lacy had 63 rushing yards and a rushing touchdown. In the Divisional Round against the Arizona Cardinals, he had 89 rushing yards in the 26–20 overtime loss.

==== 2016 season ====
Lacy started the 2016 season with 61 rushing yards in a 27–23 victory over the Jacksonville Jaguars. On October 11, he injured his ankle in a Sunday Night Football game against the New York Giants. He was placed on injured reserve on October 20, 2016. He started the first five games of the season, rushing for 360 yards on 71 attempts with no touchdowns and averaged a career-high 5.1 yards per carry in the 2016 season.

=== Seattle Seahawks ===
On March 14, 2017, Lacy signed a one-year, $5.5 million contract with the Seattle Seahawks with $3 million guaranteed. He was offered similar contracts from the Packers and Minnesota Vikings before ultimately choosing to sign with Seattle. On June 12, 2017, Lacy passed his latest weigh-in, which required him to be 250 pounds or less. He made $55,000 as part of his contract.

Lacy struggled in the 2017 season as part of a crowded backfield. On September 10, in his Seahawks debut, he had five rushes for three yards in a 17–9 loss to his former team, the Green Bay Packers. Overall, he finished the 2017 season with 179 rushing yards and six receptions for 47 yards.

In April 2019, Lacy had a tryout with the Baltimore Ravens, but was not signed.

== Career statistics ==
=== NFL ===
==== Regular season ====
Year	Team	Games		Rushing					Receiving					Fumbles	
Year	Team	GP	GS	Att	Yds	Avg	Lng	TD	Rec	Yds	Avg	Lng	TD	Fum	Lost
2013	GB	15	15	284	1,178	4.1	60	11	35	257	7.3	34	0	1	1
2014	GB	16	16	246	1,139	4.6	44	9	42	427	10.2	67	4	3	2
2015	GB	15	12	187	758	4.1	29	3	20	188	9.4	28	2	4	2
2016	GB	5	5	71	360	5.1	31	0	4	28	7.0	17	0	0	0
2017	SEA	9	3	69	179	2.6	19	0	6	47	7.8	14	0	0	0
Total		60	51	857	3,614	4.2	60	23	107	937	8.9	67	6	8	5

==== Postseason ====
Year	Team	Games		Rushing					Receiving					Fumbles	
Year	Team	GP	GS	Att	Yds	Avg	Lng	TD	Rec	Yds	Avg	Lng	TD	Fum	Lost
2013	GB	1	1	21	81	3.9	8	0	2	7	3.5	4	0	0	0
2014	GB	2	2	40	174	4.4	29	0	1	10	10.0	10	0	0	0
2015	GB	2	2	24	152	6.3	61	1	2	2	1.0	4	0	1	1
2016	GB	0	0	DNP											
Total		5	5	85	407	4.8	61	1	5	19	3.8	10	0	1	1

=== College ===
Season	Team	GP	Rushing				Receiving		
Season	Team	GP	Att	Yds	Avg	TD	Rec	Yds	TD
2010	Alabama	12	56	406	7.3	6	2	18	0
2011	Alabama	12	95	674	7.1	7	11	131	0
2012	Alabama	14	204	1,322	6.5	17	22	189	2
Total		38	355	2,402	6.8	30	35	338	2

== Personal life ==
On September 30, 2024, Lacy was arrested in Scottsdale, Arizona on four charges, including suspicion of extreme DUI and possession of an open container inside a vehicle. He was later accused to have had a BAC of .325, four times the legal limit in Arizona.
