= 2012 Green Bay Packers season =

NFL team season

- Owner: Green Bay Packers, Inc. (112,158 stockholders)
- General manager: Ted Thompson
- Head coach: Mike McCarthy
- Offensive coordinator: Tom Clements
- Defensive coordinator: Dom Capers
- Home stadium: Lambeau Field

Results
- Record: 11–5
- Division place: 1st NFC North
- Playoffs: Won Wild Card Playoffs (vs. Vikings) 24–10; Lost Divisional Playoffs (at 49ers) 31–45
- All-Pros: 2: QB Aaron Rodgers (2nd team); OLB Clay Matthews III (2nd team)
- Pro Bowlers: 4: QB Aaron Rodgers; G Josh Sitton; C Jeff Saturday; OLB Clay Matthews III

Uniform

The 2012 season was the Green Bay Packers' 92nd in the National Football League (NFL), their 94th overall and their seventh under head coach Mike McCarthy. The Packers won the NFC North division title for the second year in a row with an 11–5 record. The Packers lost 45–31 to the eventual NFC champion San Francisco 49ers in the divisional round of the playoffs, finishing with a 1–1 postseason record. The Packers offense finished the season 5th in points and 11th in yards per game. The defense finished 11th in points allowed and 22nd in yards allowed per game.

== Offseason ==
=== Free agents ===
Position	Player	Free agency tag	Date signed	2012 team
QB	Matt Flynn	UFA	March 18,	Seattle Seahawks
RB	Ryan Grant	UFA	December 5	Green Bay Packers
TE	Jermichael Finley	UFA	February 22,	Green Bay Packers
C	Scott Wells	UFA	March 16,	St. Louis Rams
NT	Howard Green	UFA		
OLB	Erik Walden	UFA	April 23,	Green Bay Packers
CB	Jarrett Bush	UFA	March 20,	Green Bay Packers
CB	Pat Lee	UFA	March 21,	Oakland Raiders

RFA: Restricted free agent, UFA: Unrestricted free agent, ERFA: Exclusive rights free agent, FT: Franchise Tag

=== Additions ===
- On January 1 the Packers signed QB Nick Hill.
- On March 23 the Packers signed former Indianapolis Colts C Jeff Saturday.
- On March 23 the Packers signed former Indianapolis Colts DE Daniel Muir.
- On March 30 the Packers signed former Seattle Seahawks DE Anthony Hargrove.
- On May 23 the Packers signed former Miami Dolphins DE Phillip Merling.
- On August 12 the Packers signed former Cincinnati Bengals RB Cedric Benson.
- On September 3 the Packers signed WR Diondre Borel, TE Brandon Bostick, QB B. J. Coleman, OT Andrew Datko, DE Lawrence Guy, G Chris Scott, RB Marc Tyler and G Greg Van Roten to the practice squad.
- On December 5 the Packers signed former Green Bay Packers RB Ryan Grant after placing Johnny White on injured reserve. They also signed G Shea Allard and S Chaz Powell to the practice squad.

=== Departures ===
- On April 23 the Packers released OT Chad Clifton after a failed physical.
- On April 25 the Packers released S Nick Collins after agreeing to part ways after sustaining a career-ending neck injury in 2011.
- On May 23 the Packers released QB Nick Hill.
- On July 25 the Packers released S Charlie Peprah after a failed physical.
- On August 24 the Packers released WR Andrew Brewer, DE Anthony Hargrove, S Micah Pellerin, OT Herb Taylor and CB Dion Turner.
- On August 26 the Packers released FB Jon Hoese and DE Jarius Wynn.
- On August 31 the Packers released S Anthony Levine, CB Otis Merrill, WR Dale Moss, NT Daniel Muir, RB Marc Tyler, G Greg Van Roten, G Reggie Wells, OT Shea Allard, WR Diondre Borel, TE Brandon Bostick, QB B. J. Coleman, FB Nic Cooper, OT Andrew Datko, C Tommie Draheim, C Sampson Genus, WR Curenski Gilleylen, WR Tori Gurley and DE Lawrence Guy as part of the cutdown to the 53-man regular season roster.

=== Coaching changes ===
- On January 21, Packers offensive coordinator Joe Philbin was named the new head coach of the Miami Dolphins.
- On February 2, Packers quarterbacks coach Tom Clements was promoted to the team's offensive coordinator position.

=== Draft ===
2012 Green Bay Packers draft
Round	Pick	Player	Position	College	Notes
1	28	Nick Perry	Linebacker	USC	
2	51	Jerel Worthy	Defensive end	Michigan State	
2	62	Casey Hayward *	Cornerback	Vanderbilt	
4	132	Mike Daniels *	Defensive Tackle	Iowa	compensatory selection
4	133	Jerron McMillian	Safety	Maine	compensatory selection
5	163	Terrell Manning	Linebacker	North Carolina State	
7	241	Andrew Datko	Offensive tackle	Florida State	compensatory selection
7	243	B.J. Coleman	Quarterback	Tennessee-Chattanooga	compensatory selection
Made roster † Pro Football Hall of Fame * Made at least one Pro Bowl during career

Notes:

- The Packers acquired the No. 224 selection in a trade that sent guard Caleb Schlauderaff to the New York Jets.
- The Packers received the maximum number of compensatory selections available to teams through the NFL's compensatory draft program. Two additional picks in both the 4th and 7th rounds.
- The Packers traded No. 59 and No. 123 picks to receive No. 51 from the Philadelphia Eagles.
- The Packers traded No. 90 and No. 163 picks to receive No. 62 from the New England Patriots .
- The Packers traded No. 197, No. 224 and No. 235 picks to receive No. 163 back from the New England Patriots .

=== Undrafted free agents ===
Name	Position	College
Shea Allard	Tackle	Delaware
Don Barclay	Tackle	West Virginia
Du’ane Bennett	Running back	Minnesota
Brandon Bostick	Tight end	Newberry
Jarrett Boykin	Wide receiver	Virginia Tech
Jaymes Brooks	Guard	Virginia Tech
Grant Cook	Guard	Arkansas
Nic Cooper	Fullback	Winston-Salem State
Tommie Draheim	Center	San Diego State
Curenski Gilleylen	Wide receiver	Nebraska
Eric Lair	Tight end	Minnesota
Mike McCabe	Tackle	Holy Cross
Otis Merrill	Cornerback	Illinois State
Dezman Moses	Linebacker	Tulane
Dale Moss	Wide receiver	South Dakota State
Sean Richardson	Safety	Vanderbilt
Dion Turner	Cornerback	Southern Utah

== Staff ==
2012 Green Bay Packers staff
Front office: Executive committee – board of directors; President/CEO – Mark Murphy; Executive vice president/general manager/director of football operations – Ted Thompson; Vice president of football administration/player finance – Russ Ball; Director of football operations – John Dorsey; Director of college scouting – Brian Gutekunst; Director of pro personnel – Eliot Wolf; Assistant director of pro personnel – Tim Terry; Senior personnel executive – Alonzo Highsmith; Head coaches: Head coach – Mike McCarthy; Assistant head coach/inside linebackers – Winston Moss; Offensive coaches: Offensive coordinator – Tom Clements; Quarterbacks – Ben McAdoo; Running backs – Alex Van Pelt; Wide receivers – Edgar Bennett; Tight ends – Jerry Fontenot; Offensive line – James Campen; Assistant offensive line – Joel Hilgenberg; Offensive assistant/special teams – John Rushing	Defensive coaches: Defensive coordinator – Dom Capers; Defensive line – Mike Trgovac; Outside linebackers – Kevin Greene; Secondary (Cornerbacks) – Joe Whitt Jr.; Secondary (Safeties) – Darren Perry; Defensive quality control – Scott McCurley; Special teams coaches: Special teams coordinator – Shawn Slocum; Special teams assistant – Chad Morton; Strength and conditioning: Strength and conditioning coordinator – Mark Lovat; Strength and conditioning assistant – Thadeus Jackson; Strength and conditioning assistant – Zac Woodfin

== Final roster ==
2012 Green Bay Packers roster
Quarterbacks (QB): 6 Graham Harrell; 12 Aaron Rodgers; Running backs (RB): 25 Ryan Grant; 20 Alex Green; 26 DuJuan Harris; 30 John Kuhn FB; 44 James Starks; Wide receivers (WR): 11 Jarrett Boykin; 18 Randall Cobb; 80 Donald Driver; 85 Greg Jennings; 89 James Jones; 87 Jordy Nelson; 10 Jeremy Ross; Tight ends (TE): 83 Tom Crabtree; 88 Jermichael Finley; 82 Ryan Taylor; 84 D. J. Williams	Offensive linemen (OL): 67 Don Barclay RT; 62 Evan Dietrich-Smith C; 70 T. J. Lang G; 74 Marshall Newhouse LT; 63 Jeff Saturday C; 71 Josh Sitton G; 64 Greg Van Roten G; Defensive linemen (DL): 76 Mike Daniels DE; 94 Phillip Merling DE; 91 Jordan Miller NT; 96 Mike Neal DE; 79 Ryan Pickett DE; 90 B. J. Raji NT; 98 C. J. Wilson DE; 99 Jerel Worthy DE	Linebackers (LB): 49 Robert Francois ILB; 50 A. J. Hawk ILB; 59 Brad Jones ILB; 57 Jamari Lattimore OLB; 56 Terrell Manning ILB; 52 Clay Matthews OLB; 54 Dezman Moses OLB; 93 Erik Walden OLB; 58 Frank Zombo OLB; Defensive backs (DB): 42 Morgan Burnett FS; 24 Jarrett Bush CB; 29 Casey Hayward CB; 31 Davon House CB; 43 M. D. Jennings FS; 22 Jerron McMillian FS; 37 Sam Shields CB; 38 Tramon Williams CB; 21 Charles Woodson SS; Special teams (ST): 2 Mason Crosby K; 61 Brett Goode LS; 8 Tim Masthay P	Practice squad: 48 Brandon Bostick TE; 9 B. J. Coleman QB; 77 Andrew Datko RT; 72 Shea Allard RT; 73 Joe Gibbs G; 47 Otis Merrill CB; 23 James Nixon CB; 41 Chaz Powell S; 26 Marc Tyler S; Reserve: 32 Cedric Benson RB (IR/DFR); 55 Desmond Bishop ILB (IR); 75 Bryan Bulaga RT (IR); -- Johnny Jolly DE (Susp.); 53 Nick Perry OLB (IR); 81 Andrew Quarless TE (IR); 28 Sean Richardson SS (IR); 33 Brandon Saine RB (IR); 78 Derek Sherrod RT (PUP); 51 D. J. Smith ILB (IR); 34 Johnny White RB (IR); Rookies in italics 53 active, 10 reserve, 8 practice squad

== Regular season ==
=== Starters on offense ===
POS	Name	GS	Name	GS	Name	GS	Name	GS	Name	GS
QB	Aaron Rodgers	16+1 playoff								
RB	Alex Green	6	Cedric Benson	5	James Starks	3	Ryan Grant	2	DuJuan Harris	0+1 playoff
FB	John Kuhn	14 + 1 playoff	Ryan Taylor	2						
WR	Greg Jennings	8 + 1 playoff	James Jones	6	Randall Cobb	2				
WR	Jordy Nelson	12	Randall Cobb	4 + 1 playoff						
TE	Jermichael Finley	16 + 1 playoff								
LT	Marshall Newhouse	16 + 1 playoff								
LG	T. J. Lang	11 + 1 playoff	Evan Dietrich-Smith	5						
C	Jeff Saturday	14	Evan Dietrich-Smith	2 + 1 playoff						
RG	Josh Sitton	16 + 1 playoff								
RT	Bryan Bulaga	9	Don Barclay	4 + 1 playoff	T. J. Lang	3				

=== Starters on defense and special teams ===
POS	Name	GS	Name	GS	Name	GS
LDE	Ryan Pickett	14 + 1 playoff	Jerel Worthy	2		
NT	B. J. Raji	14 + 1 playoff	Ryan Pickett	2		
RDE	C. J. Wilson	13 + 1 playoff	Jerel Worthy	3		
LOLB	Erik Walden	10 + 1 playoff	Nick Perry	6		
MLB	A. J. Hawk	16 + 1 playoff				
MLB	Brad Jones	10 + 1 playoff	D. J. Smith	6		
ROLB	Clay Matthews	12 + 1 playoff	Dezman Moses	4		
RCB	Tramon Williams	16 + 1 playoff				
LCB	Sam Shields	9 + 1 playoff	Casey Hayward	6	Jarrett Bush	1
SS	M. D. Jennings	9	Charles Woodson	7 + 1 playoff		
FS	Morgan Burnett	16 + 1 playoff				
K	Mason Crosby	16 + 1 playoff				
P	Tim Masthay	16 + 1 playoff				

== Schedule ==
=== Preseason ===
Week	Date	Opponent	Result	Record	Game site	NFL.com recap
1	August 9	at San Diego Chargers	**L** 13–21	0–1	Qualcomm Stadium	Recap
2	August 16	Cleveland Browns	**L** 10–35	0–2	Lambeau Field	Recap
3	August 23	at Cincinnati Bengals	**W** 27–13	1–2	Paul Brown Stadium	Recap
4	August 30	Kansas City Chiefs	**W** 24–3	2–2	Lambeau Field	Recap

=== Regular season ===
Week	Date	Opponent	Result	Record	Game site	NFL.com recap
1	September 9	San Francisco 49ers	**L** 22–30	0–1	Lambeau Field	Recap
2	September 13	**Chicago Bears**	**W** 23–10	1–1	Lambeau Field	Recap
3	September 24	at Seattle Seahawks	**L** 12–14	1–2	CenturyLink Field	Recap
4	September 30	New Orleans Saints	**W** 28–27	2–2	Lambeau Field	Recap
5	October 7	at Indianapolis Colts	**L** 27–30	2–3	Lucas Oil Stadium	Recap
6	October 14	at Houston Texans	**W** 42–24	3–3	Reliant Stadium	Recap
7	October 21	at St. Louis Rams	**W** 30–20	4–3	Edward Jones Dome	Recap
8	October 28	Jacksonville Jaguars	**W** 24–15	5–3	Lambeau Field	Recap
9	November 4	Arizona Cardinals	**W** 31–17	6–3	Lambeau Field	Recap
10	Bye					
11	November 18	at **Detroit Lions**	**W** 24–20	7–3	Ford Field	Recap
12	November 25	at New York Giants	**L** 10–38	7–4	MetLife Stadium	Recap
13	December 2	**Minnesota Vikings**	**W** 23–14	8–4	Lambeau Field	Recap
14	December 9	**Detroit Lions**	**W** 27–20	9–4	Lambeau Field	Recap
15	December 16	at **Chicago Bears**	**W** 21–13	10–4	Soldier Field	Recap
16	December 23	Tennessee Titans	**W** 55–7	11–4	Lambeau Field	Recap
17	December 30	at **Minnesota Vikings**	**L** 34–37	11–5	Mall of America Field	Recap

Note: Intra-division opponents are in bold text.

=== Postseason ===
Playoff round	Date	Opponent	Result	Record	Game site	NFL.com recap
Wild Card	January 5, 2013	Minnesota Vikings (6)	**W** 24–10	1–0	Lambeau Field	Recap
Divisional	January 12, 2013	at San Francisco 49ers (2)	**L** 31–45	1–1	Candlestick Park	Recap

== Standings ==
NFC North
	W	L	T	PCT	DIV	CONF	PF	PA	STK
^{(3)} Green Bay Packers	11	5	0	.688	5–1	8–4	433	336	L1
^{(6)} Minnesota Vikings	10	6	0	.625	4–2	7–5	379	348	W4
Chicago Bears	10	6	0	.625	3–3	7–5	375	277	W2
Detroit Lions	4	12	0	.250	0–6	3–9	372	437	L8

== Regular season results ==
=== Week 1: vs. San Francisco 49ers ===
Week One: San Francisco 49ers at Green Bay Packers – Game summary

Quarter	1	2	3	4	Total
49ers	3	13	7	7	30
Packers	0	7	0	15	22

at Lambeau Field, Green Bay, Wisconsin

- Date: September 9
- Game time: 3:25 p.m. CDT
- Game weather: 72 °F (22 °C), (Sunny)
- Game attendance: 70,523
- Referee: David White
- TV announcers (Fox): Joe Buck, Troy Aikman and Pam Oliver
- Gamebook

Game information

First quarter

- SF – David Akers 40 yd. FG, 4:53 (SF 3–0)

Second quarter

- SF – Randy Moss 14 yd. TD pass from Alex Smith, David Akers XP good, 11:10 (SF 10–0)
- GB – Jermichael Finley 1 yd. TD pass from Aaron Rodgers, Mason Crosby XP good, 4:40 (SF 10–7)
- SF – David Akers 43 yd. FG, 0:55 (SF 13–7)
- SF – David Akers 63 yd. FG, 0:00 (SF 16–7)

Third quarter

- SF – Vernon Davis 4 yd. TD pass from Alex Smith, David Akers XP good, 8:16 (SF 23–7)

Fourth quarter

- GB – Randall Cobb 75 yd. punt return TD, Jordy Nelson pass from Aaron Rodgers 2-point conversion good, 11:16 (SF 23–15)
- SF – Frank Gore 23 yd. TD run, David Akers XP good, 8:41 (SF 30–15)
- GB – James Jones 10 yd. TD pass from Aaron Rodgers, Mason Crosby XP good, 6:05 (SF 30–22)

Top passers

- SF – Alex Smith – 20/26, 211 Yards, 2 TDs, 0 INTs
- GB – Aaron Rodgers – 30/44, 303 Yards, 2 TDs, 1 INT

Top rushers

- SF – Frank Gore – 16 carries, 112 yards, 1 TD
- GB – Aaron Rodgers – 5 carries, 27 yards

Top receivers

- SF – Michael Crabtree – 7 receptions, 76 yards
- GB – James Jones – 4 receptions, 81 yards, 1 TD

Top tacklers

- SF – NaVorro Bowman – 8 tackles, 3 assists, 1 INT
- GB – A. J. Hawk – 10 tackles, 4 assists

After finishing last season with a league best 15–1 record, the Green Bay Packers began their 2012 campaign against the San Francisco 49ers who finished second to the Packers in the NFC with a 13–3 record. San Francisco delivered the game's opening punch in the first quarter as David Akers converted a 40-yard field goal. The 49ers further extended their lead when veteran WR Randy Moss (who had joined the 49ers after spending a year in retirement) caught a 17-yard pass in the middle of the end zone from Alex Smith in the 2nd quarter. The Packers scored their first points of the season when Aaron Rodgers connected with TE Jermichael Finley in the center of the endzone on a 1-yard pass. Rodgers and the Packers offense struggled to move the ball and David Akers added two more field goals for the 49ers including a long distance 63-yard field goal that hit the cross bar and bounced through as the 1st half came to an end. The Packers went into the locker room down 16–7. The 49ers continued their scoring in the third quarter with Vernon Davis hauling in a 4-yard pass in the end zone from Alex Smith to further extend the 49ers lead to 23–7. The Packers' managed to chip into the 49ers lead when WR Randall Cobb returned a punt 75 yards for a touchdown. Rodgers completed a pass to Jordy Nelson for the 2-point conversion to bring the lead down to a more manageable 8-point lead. However, Rodgers threw a costly interception to LB NaVorro Bowman on the Packers next offensive possession which set up the 49ers with great field position. Following the INT, RB Frank Gore scored a touchdown on a 23-yard scamper into the endzone down the right sideline. The Packers drove down and Rodgers completed a 10-yard touchdown pass to James Jones to bring the Packers within 8 points for the second time with a little over 6 minutes remaining in the game. The Packers forced the 49ers to punt with 3:45 remaining on the clock but hope expired on a come from behind victory when Rodgers failed to complete an attempted pass to Jordy Nelson on 4th and 10. The 49ers regained possession and ran out the game clock. With the loss, Green Bay began their season 0–1 matching the Packers regular season losses for all of the 2011 season. Also, this game ended their streak of 13 consecutive regular season victories at Lambeau Field. Green Bay would not lose another home opener game until 2026.

=== Week 2: vs. Chicago Bears ===
Week Two: Chicago Bears at Green Bay Packers – Game summary

Quarter	1	2	3	4	Total
Bears	0	0	3	7	10
Packers	0	13	0	10	23

at Lambeau Field, Green Bay, Wisconsin

- Date: September 13
- Game time: 7:20 pm. CDT
- Game weather: 55 °F (13 °C), (Clear)
- Game attendance: 70,543
- Referee: Gerald Wright
- TV announcers (NFLN): Brad Nessler, Mike Mayock and Alex Flanagan
- Gamebook

Game information

First quarter

- No scoring plays

Second quarter

- GB – Mason Crosby 48 yd. FG, 12:56 (GB 3–0)
- GB – Tom Crabtree 27 yd. TD pass from Tim Masthay, Mason Crosby XP good, 1:50 (GB 10–0)
- GB – Mason Crosby 35 yd. FG, 0:00 (GB 13–0)

Third quarter

- CHI – Robbie Gould 45 yd. FG, 8:49 (GB 13–3)

Fourth quarter

- GB – Mason Crosby 54 yd. FG, 11:38 (GB 16–3)
- GB – Donald Driver 26 yd. TD pass from Aaron Rodgers, Mason Crosby XP good, 11:17 (GB 23–3)
- CHI – Kellen Davis 21 yd. TD pass from Jay Cutler, Robbie Gould XP good, 6:49 (GB 23–10)

Top passers

- CHI – Jay Cutler – 11/27, 126 Yards, 1 TD, 4 INTs
- GB – Aaron Rodgers – 22/32, 219 Yards, 1 TD, 1 INT

Top rushers

- CHI – Michael Bush – 14 carries, 54 yards
- GB – Cedric Benson – 20 carries, 81 yards

Top receivers

- CHI – Matt Forte – 4 receptions, 49 yards
- GB – Jordy Nelson – 6 receptions, 84 yards

Top tacklers

- CHI – Lance Briggs – 7 tackles, 3 assists
- GB – Clay Matthews – 4 tackles, 3 assists, 3.5 sacks

With the win, the Packers improved to 1–1.

=== Week 3: at Seattle Seahawks ===
Week Three: Green Bay Packers at Seattle Seahawks – Game summary

Quarter	1	2	3	4	Total
Packers	0	0	6	6	12
Seahawks	0	7	0	7	14

at CenturyLink Field, Seattle, Washington

- Date: September 24
- Game time: 7:30 pm. CDT/5:30 p.m. PDT
- Game weather: 67 °F (19 °C), sunny
- Game attendance: 68,218
- Referee: Wayne Elliott
- TV announcers (ESPN): Mike Tirico, Jon Gruden and Lisa Salters
- Gamebook

Game information

First quarter

- No scoring plays

Second quarter

- SEA – Golden Tate 41 yd. TD pass from Russell Wilson, Steven Hauschka XP good, 6:22 (SEA 7–0)

Third quarter

- GB – Mason Crosby 29 yd. FG, 8:07 (SEA 7–3)
- GB – Mason Crosby 40 yd. FG, 1:14 (SEA 7–6)

Fourth quarter

- GB – Cedric Benson 1 yd. TD run, 2 pt conversion attempt failed 8:44 (GB 12–7)
- SEA – Golden Tate 24 yd. TD pass from Russell Wilson, Steven Hauschka XP good, 0:00 (SEA 14–12)

Top passers

- GB – Aaron Rodgers – 26/39, 223 yards
- SEA – Russell Wilson – 10/21, 130 yards, 2 TD

Top rushers

- GB – Cedric Benson – 17 carries, 45 yards, 1 TD
- SEA – Marshawn Lynch – 25 carries, 98 yards

Top receivers

- GB – Jermichael Finley – 4 receptions, 60 yards
- SEA – Golden Tate – 3 receptions, 68 yards, 2 TD

Top tacklers

- GB – A. J. Hawk – 11 tackles
- SEA – K. J. Wright – 11 tackles

With the controversial loss, the Packers fell to 1–2. QB Aaron Rodgers was held without a touchdown for the first time since the teams' 9–0 shutout against the Jets during the 2010 season. The team was one of six 2011 playoff teams to be under .500 after their first three games.

=== Week 4: vs. New Orleans Saints ===
Week Four: New Orleans Saints at Green Bay Packers – Game summary

Quarter	1	2	3	4	Total
Saints	7	7	10	3	27
Packers	7	14	0	7	28

at Lambeau Field, Green Bay, Wisconsin

- Date: September 30
- Game time: 3:25 pm. CDT
- Game weather: 64 °F (18 °C), (Sunny)
- Game attendance: 70,571
- Referee: Jeff Triplette
- TV announcers (Fox): Joe Buck, Troy Aikman and Pam Oliver
- Gamebook

Game information

First quarter

- GB – James Jones 12 yd. TD pass from Aaron Rodgers, Mason Crosby XP good, 9:02 (GB 7–0)
- NO – Marques Colston 20 yd. TD pass from Drew Brees, Garrett Hartley XP good, 3:33 (7–7)

Second quarter

- GB – Greg Jennings 9 yd. TD pass from Aaron Rodgers, Mason Crosby XP good, 14:15 (GB 14–7)
- GB – James Jones 14 yd. TD pass from Aaron Rodgers, Mason Crosby XP good, 4:50 (GB 21–7)
- NO – Darren Sproles 6 yd. TD pass from Drew Brees, Garrett Hartley XP good, 0:27 (GB 21–14)

Third quarter

- NO – Garrett Hartley 20 yd. FG, 9:41 (GB 21–17)
- NO – Joe Morgan 80 yd. TD pass from Drew Brees, Garrett Hartley XP good, 3:49 (NO 24–21)

Fourth quarter

- NO – Garrett Hartley 27 yd. FG, 13:04 (NO 27-21)
- GB – Jordy Nelson 11 yd. TD pass from Aaron Rodgers, Mason Crosby XP good, 7:00 (GB 28–27)

Top passers

- GB – Aaron Rodgers – 31/41, 319 yards, 4 TD, 1 INT
- NO – Drew Brees – 35/54, 446 yards, 3 TD

Top rushers

- GB – Cedric Benson – 18 carries, 84 yards
- NO – Darren Sproles – 5 carries, 20 yards

Top receivers

- GB – Jordy Nelson – 8 receptions, 93 yards, 1 TD
- NO – Marques Colston – 9 receptions, 153 yards, 1 TD

Top tacklers

- GB – Morgan Burnett – 14 tackles
- NO – Curtis Lofton – 12 tackles

In spite of the surprising loss to the Seahawks, the Packers returned home for a game against the Saints. The Saints tried to avenge their losing in Green Bay last season. However, the Packers would win this game and improve to 2–2 while the Saints dropped to 0–4.

=== Week 5: at Indianapolis Colts ===
Week Five: Green Bay Packers at Indianapolis Colts – Game summary

Quarter	1	2	3	4	Total
Packers	7	14	0	6	27
Colts	0	3	16	11	30

at Lucas Oil Stadium, Indianapolis, Indiana

- Date: October 7
- Game time: 1:00 p.m. EDT/12:00 pm. CDT
- Game weather: Played indoors (retractable roof closed)
- Game attendance: 67,020
- Referee: Walt Anderson
- TV announcers (Fox): Thom Brennaman, Brian Billick and Laura Okmin
- Gamebook

Game information

First quarter

- GB – John Kuhn 1 yd. TD run, Mason Crosby XP good, 2:07 (GB 7–0)

Second quarter

- GB – James Jones 6 yd. TD pass from Aaron Rodgers, Mason Crosby XP good, 12:25 (GB 14–0)
- IND – Adam Vinatieri 24 yd. FG, 12:25 (GB 14–3)
- GB – Randall Cobb 31 yd. TD pass from Aaron Rodgers, Mason Crosby XP good, 4:21 (GB 21–3)

Third quarter

- IND – Dwayne Allen 8 yd. TD pass from Andrew Luck, Adam Vinatieri XP good, 6:21 (GB 21–10)
- IND – Adam Vinatieri 50 yd. FG, 7:42 (GB 21–13)
- IND – Andrew Luck 3 yd. TD run, 2 pt conversion attempt failed, 0:18 (GB 21–19)

Fourth quarter

- IND – Adam Vinatieri 28 yd. FG, 8:04 (IND 22–21)
- GB – James Jones 8 yd. TD pass from Aaron Rodgers, 2-point conversion attempt failed, 9:02 (GB 27–22)
- IND – Reggie Wayne 4 yd. TD pass from Andrew Luck, Donald Brown 2-point conversion rush attempt successful, 6:21 (IND 30–27)

Top passers

- GB – Aaron Rodgers – 21/33, 243 yards, 3 TDs, 1 INT
- IND – Andrew Luck – 31/55, 362 yards, 2 TDs, 1 INT

Top rushers

- GB – Aaron Rodgers – 5 carries, 57 yards
- IND – Donald Brown – 17 carries, 84 yards

Top receivers

- GB – Randall Cobb – 4 receptions, 82 yards, 1 TD
- IND – Reggie Wayne – 13 receptions, 212 yards, 1 TD

Top tacklers

- GB – Morgan Burnett 9 tackles
- IND – Jerrell Freeman 8 tackles

The Packers went to Indianapolis for a game against the Colts. Despite the fact that the team was up 21–3 at halftime, the Colts erased the lead in the 2nd half and won the game 30–27. This dropped the Packers' record to 2–3 on the season, 0–1 against the AFC South, and 0–4 all-time in Indianapolis.

=== Week 6: at Houston Texans ===
Week Six: Green Bay Packers at Houston Texans – Game summary

Quarter	1	2	3	4	Total
Packers	14	7	7	14	42
Texans	0	10	7	7	24

at Reliant Stadium, Houston, Texas

- Date: October 14
- Game time: 7:20 pm. CDT
- Game weather: Played indoors (retractable roof closed)
- Game attendance: 71,702
- Referee: Jerome Boger
- TV announcers (NBC): Al Michaels, Cris Collinsworth and Michele Tafoya
- Gamebook

Game information

First quarter

- GB – Jordy Nelson 41 yd. TD pass from Aaron Rodgers, Mason Crosby XP good, 11:42 (GB 7–0)
- GB – James Jones 6 yd. TD pass from Aaron Rodgers, Mason Crosby XP good, 0:32 (GB 14–0)

Second quarter

- HOU – Arian Foster 1 yd. TD run, Shayne Graham XP good, 10:19 (GB 14–7)
- GB – Jordy Nelson 21 yd. TD pass from Aaron Rodgers, Mason Crosby XP good, 6:51 (GB 21–7)
- HOU – Shayne Graham 51 yd. FG, 2:21 (GB 21–10)

Third quarter

- GB – Jordy Nelson 1 yd. TD pass from Aaron Rodgers, Mason Crosby XP good, 8:22 (GB 28–10)
- HOU – Arian Foster 1 yd. TD run, Shayne Graham XP good, 0:21 (GB 28–17)

Fourth quarter

- GB – Tom Crabtree 48 yd. TD pass from Aaron Rodgers, Mason Crosby XP good, 14:54 (GB 35–17)
- GB – James Jones 18 yd. TD pass from Aaron Rodgers, Mason Crosby XP good, 12:22 (GB 42–17)
- HOU – Punt blocked by Bryan Braman and recovered by DeVier Posey in the end zone for a TD Shayne Graham XP good, 5:35 (GB 42–24)

Top passers

- GB – Aaron Rodgers – 24/37, 338 yards, 6 TDs
- HOU – Matt Schaub – 20/33, 232 yards, 2 INTs

Top rushers

- GB – Alex Green – 22 carries, 65 yards
- HOU – Justin Forsett – 7 carries, 47 yards

Top receivers

- GB – Jordy Nelson – 9 receptions, 121 yards, 3 TDs
- HOU – Andre Johnson – 8 recepetions, 75 yards

Top tacklers

- GB – A. J. Hawk – 10 tackles
- HOU – Glover Quin – 8 tackles

With the victory over the previously undefeated Texans, the Packers improved their season to 3–3 and 5–0 all-time in the city of Houston. Aaron Rodgers tied the franchise record with 6 touchdown passes. Before the game the Texans defense only allowed 6 touchdowns all season.

=== Week 7: at St. Louis Rams ===
Week Seven: Green Bay Packers at St. Louis Rams – Game summary

Quarter	1	2	3	4	Total
Packers	10	0	7	13	30
Rams	3	3	0	14	20

at Edward Jones Dome, St. Louis, Missouri

- Date: October 21
- Game time: 12:00 pm. CDT
- Game weather: Played indoors (dome stadium)
- Game attendance: 64,359
- Referee: Bill Vinovich
- TV announcers (Fox): Sam Rosen, Brian Billick and Laura Okmin
- Gamebook

Game information

First quarter

- STL – Greg Zuerlein 50 yd. FG, 7:38 (STL 3–0)
- GB – Jordy Nelson 3 yd. TD pass from Aaron Rodgers, Mason Crosby XP good, 5:23 (GB 7–3)
- GB – Mason Crosby 47 yd. FG, 2:17 (GB 10–3)

Second quarter

- STL – Greg Zuerlein 43 yd. FG, 0:40 (GB 10–6)

Third quarter

- GB – Randall Cobb 5 yd. TD pass from Aaron Rodgers, Mason Crosby XP good, 8:04 (GB 17–6)

Fourth quarter

- GB – Mason Crosby 23 yd. FG, 11:52 (GB 20–6)
- STL – Steven Jackson 6 yd. TD run, Greg Zuerlein XP good, 8:50 (GB 20–13)
- GB – Randall Cobb 36 yd. TD pass from Aaron Rodgers, Mason Crosby XP good, 3:09 (GB 27–13)
- GB – Mason Crosby 48 yd. FG, 1:49 (GB 30–13)
- STL – Austin Pettis 3 yd. TD pass from Sam Bradford, Greg Zuerlein XP good, 0:15 (GB 30–20)

Top passers

- GB – Aaron Rodgers – 30/37, 342 yards, 3 TDs
- STL – Sam Bradford – 21/34, 255 yards, 1 TD, 1 INT

Top rushers

- GB – Alex Green – 20 carries, 35 yards
- STL – Steven Jackson – 12 carries, 57 yards, 1 TD

Top receivers

- GB – Jordy Nelson – 8 receptions, 122 yards, 1 TD
- STL – Brandon Gibson – 5 receptions, 60 yards

Top tacklers

- GB – Erik Walden – 9 tackles, 1 sack
- STL – James Laurinaitis 14 tackles

The Packers traveled to St. Louis to take on the Rams. The game was unfortunately close unlike the previous season's 24–3 blowout win but the Packers would end up winning 30–20 while improving to 4–3.

=== Week 8: vs. Jacksonville Jaguars ===
Week Eight: Jacksonville Jaguars at Green Bay Packers – Game summary

Quarter	1	2	3	4	Total
Jaguars	3	9	0	3	15
Packers	7	7	0	10	24

at Lambeau Field, Green Bay, Wisconsin

- Date: October 28
- Game time: 12:00 pm. CDT
- Game weather: 45 °F (7 °C), (Sunny)
- Game attendance: 70,464
- Referee: Carl Cheffers
- TV announcers (CBS): Greg Gumbel and Dan Dierdorf
- Gamebook

Game information

First quarter

- JAC – Josh Scobee 38 yd. FG, 8:23 (JAC 3–0)
- GB – Randall Cobb 5 yd. TD pass from Aaron Rodgers, Mason Crosby XP good, 2:54 (GB 7–3)

Second quarter

- GB – Davon House blocked punt recovered by Dezman Moses in the end zone for a TD, Mason Crosby XP good (GB 14–3)
- JAC – Josh Scobee 22 yd. FG, 1:03 (GB 14–6)
- JAC – Guy Whimper 1 yd. TD pass from Blaine Gabbert, 2 pt conversion attempt pass failed, 0:17 (GB 14–12)

Third quarter

- No scoring plays

Fourth quarter

- GB – Donald Driver 5 yd. TD pass from Aaron Rodgers, Mason Crosby XP good, 12:36 (GB 21–12)
- JAC – Josh Scobee 32 yd. FG, 6:50 (GB 21–15)
- GB – Mason Crosby 25 yd. FG, 0:28 (GB 24–15)

Top passers

- JAC – Blaine Gabbert – 27/49, 303 yards, 1 TD
- GB – Aaron Rodgers – 22/35, 186 yards, 2 TD

Top rushers

- JAC – Rashad Jennings – 17 carries, 59 yards
- GB – Alex Green – 22 carries, 54 yards

Top receivers

- JAC – Cecil Shorts III – 8 receptions, 116 yards
- GB – James Jones – 7 receptions, 78 yards

Top tacklers

- JAC – Russell Allen – 7 tackles
- GB – Morgan Burnett – 11 tackles, 1 sack

With their third consecutive win, the Packers improved to 5–3, dropping to the Jacksonville Jaguars to 1–1 at Lambeau Field. The Kansas City Chiefs and Houston Texans are now the only two remaining teams which have never lost at Lambeau, sitting at 3–0 and 1–0, respectively.

=== Week 9: vs. Arizona Cardinals ===
Week Nine: Arizona Cardinals at Green Bay Packers – Game summary

Quarter	1	2	3	4	Total
Cardinals	0	7	10	0	17
Packers	7	14	10	0	31

at Lambeau Field, Green Bay, Wisconsin

- Date: November 4
- Game time: 12:00 pm. CST
- Game weather: 37 °F (3 °C), (Sunny)
- Game attendance: 70,504
- Referee: Walt Coleman
- TV announcers (Fox): Joe Buck, Troy Aikman and Pam Oliver
- Gamebook

Game information

First quarter

- GB – Randall Cobb 13 Yard TD Pass from Aaron Rodgers, (Mason Crosby XP), (GB 7–0)

Second quarter

- ARI – LaRod Stephens-Howling 1 Yard TD Run, (Jay Feely XP), (7–7)
- GB – Randall Cobb 21 Yard TD Pass from Aaron Rodgers, (Mason Crosby XP), (GB 14–7)
- GB – James Jones 28 Yard TD Pass from Aaron Rodgers, (Mason Crosby XP), (GB 21–7)

Third quarter

- GB – Mason Crosby 33 Yard FG, (GB 24–7)
- ARI – Larry Fitzgerald 31 Yard TD Pass from John Skelton, (Jay Feely XP), (GB 24–14)
- ARI – Jay Feely 20 Yard FG, (GB 24–17)
- GB – Tom Crabtree 72 Yard TD Pass from Aaron Rodgers, (Mason Crosby XP), (GB 31–17)

Top passers

- ARI – John Skelton – 23/46, 306 Yards, TD, INT
- GB – Aaron Rodgers – 14/30, 218 Yards, 4 TD, INT

Top rushers

- ARI – LaRod Stephens-Howling – 17 Rushes, 51 Yards, TD
- GB – James Starks – 17 Rushes, 61 Yards

Top receivers

- ARI – Andre Roberts – 4 Receptions, 86 Yards
- GB – Tom Crabtree – Reception, 72 Yards, TD

Top tacklers

- ARI – Calais Campbell – 9 Tackles, Sack
- GB – Brad Jones – 9 Tackles

The Packers head into their bye week 6–3 after 4 touchdown passes by Aaron Rodgers. The Packers gained 176 yards rushing, the most by the Packers in a game since 2009 vs the Cleveland Browns. The Arizona Cardinals drop to 0–7 all-time at Lambeau Field after losing their fifth consecutive game.

=== Week 11: at Detroit Lions ===
Week Eleven: Green Bay Packers at Detroit Lions – Game summary

Quarter	1	2	3	4	Total
Packers	0	7	7	10	24
Lions	3	7	7	3	20

at Ford Field, Detroit, Michigan

- Date: November 18
- Game time: 1:00 pm. EST/12:00 pm. CST
- Game weather: Played indoors (dome stadium)
- Game attendance: 63,716
- Referee: Ron Winter
- TV announcers (Fox): Joe Buck, Troy Aikman and Pam Oliver
- Gamebook

Game information

First quarter

- DET – Jason Hanson 30 yd. FG, 4:24 (DET 3–0)

Second quarter

- GB – Jermichael Finley 20 yd. TD pass from Aaron Rodgers, Mason Crosby XP good, 13:56 (GB 7–3)
- DET – Mikel Leshoure 1 yd. TD run, Jason Hanson XP good, 8:06 (DET 10–7)

Third quarter

- GB – M. D. Jennings 72-yard interception return, Mason Crosby XP good, 8:31 (GB 14–10)

Fourth quarter

- DET – Calvin Johnson 25 yd. TD pass from Matthew Stafford, Jason Hanson XP good, 4:25 (DET 17–14)
- DET – Jason Hanson 27 yd. FG, 4:25 (DET 20–14)
- GB – Randall Cobb 22 yd. TD pass from Aaron Rodgers. Mason Crosby XP good, 1:55 (GB 21–20)
- GB – Mason Crosby 39 yd. FG, 0:19 (GB 24–20)

Top passers

- GB – Aaron Rodgers 19/27, 236 yards, 2 TD, 1 INT
- DET – Matthew Stafford 17/39, 266 yards, 1 TD, 2 INT

Top rushers

- GB – James Starks 25 carries, 74 yards
- DET – Mikel Leshoure 19 carries, 84 yards, 1 TD

Top receivers

- GB – Randall Cobb 9 receptions, 74 yards, 1 TD
- DET – Calvin Johnson 5 receptions, 143 yards, 1 TD

Top tacklers

- GB – A. J. Hawk 10 tackles
- DET – Stephen Tulloch 9 tackles

With their win on the other side of Lake Michigan against the longtime rival Detroit Lions, Green Bay improved to 7–3 and set a franchise record of nine straight regular season victories over their three division rivals, dating back to Week 17 of their 2010 season.

=== Week 12: at New York Giants ===
Week Twelve: Green Bay Packers at New York Giants – Game summary

Quarter	1	2	3	4	Total
Packers	7	3	0	0	10
Giants	17	14	7	0	38

at MetLife Stadium, East Rutherford, New Jersey

- Date: November 25
- Game time: 8:20 pm. EST/7:20 pm. CST
- Game weather: 34 °F (1 °C), mostly clear
- Game attendance: 80,365
- Referee: Terry McAulay
- TV announcers (NBC): Al Michaels, Cris Collinsworth and Michele Tafoya
- Gamebook

Game information

First quarter

- NYG – Andre Brown 2 Yard TD Run, Lawrence Tynes XP, (NYG 7–0)
- GB – Jordy Nelson 61 Yard TD Pass from Aaron Rodgers, Mason Crosby XP, (7–7)
- NYG – Rueben Randle 16 Yard TD Pass from Eli Manning, Lawrence Tynes XP, (NYG 14–7)
- NYG – Lawrence Tynes 43 Yard FG, (NYG 17–7)

Second quarter

- NYG – Victor Cruz 9 Yard TD Pass from Eli Manning, Lawrence Tynes XP, (NYG 24–7)
- GB – Mason Crosby 43 Yard FG, (NYG 24–10)
- NYG – Ahmad Bradshaw 13 Yard TD Run, Lawrence Tynes XP, (NYG 31–10)

Third quarter

- NYG – Hakeem Nicks 13 Yard TD Pass from Eli Manning, Lawrence Tynes XP, (NYG 38–10)

Top passers

- GB – Aaron Rodgers – 14/25, 219 Yards, TD, INT
- NYG – Eli Manning – 16/30, 249 Yards, 3 TD

Top rushers

- GB – James Starks – 8 Rushes, 35 yards
- NYG – Andre Brown – 13 Rushes, 64 Yards, 1 TD

Top receivers

- GB – Jordy Nelson – Receptions, 61 Yards, TD
- NYG – Hakeem Nicks – 5 Receptions, 77 Yards, TD

Top tacklers

- GB – A. J. Hawk – 8 Tackles
- NYG – Mathias Kiwanuka – 5 Tackles, 2 Sacks

After winning against the Lions, the Packers traveled on the road to take on the Giants, who eliminated them from the playoffs last season 37–20. The Packers were overpowered as they would lose 38–10 and dropped to 7–4 on the season. With the Bears win earlier in the day, the Packers now sit in 2nd place in the NFC North.

=== Week 13: vs. Minnesota Vikings ===
Week Thirteen: Minnesota Vikings at Green Bay Packers – Game summary

Quarter	1	2	3	4	Total
Vikings	0	14	0	0	14
Packers	10	0	10	3	23

at Lambeau Field, Green Bay, Wisconsin

- Date: December 2
- Game time: 12:00 pm. CST
- Game weather: 45 °F (7 °C), (Haze)
- Game attendance: 70,567
- Referee: Ed Hochuli
- TV announcers (Fox): Joe Buck, Troy Aikman and Pam Oliver
- Gamebook

Game information

First quarter

- GB – James Jones 32 yd. TD pass from Aaron Rodgers, Mason Crosby XP good, 11:26 (GB 7–0)
- GB – Mason Crosby 30 yd. FG, 4:07 (GB 10–0)

Second quarter

- MIN – Kyle Rudolph 7 yd. TD pass from Christian Ponder, Blair Walsh XP good, 12:18 (GB 10–7)
- MIN – Adrian Peterson 82 yd. TD run, Blair Walsh XP good, 5:08 (MIN 14–10)

Third quarter

- GB – Mason Crosby 47 yd. FG, 7:47 (GB 17–14)
- GB – James Starks 22 yd. TD run, Mason Crosby XP good, 2:12 (GB 20–14)

Fourth quarter

- GB – Mason Crosby 31 yd. FG, 4:00 (GB 23–14)

Top passers

- MIN – Christian Ponder – 12/25, 119 yards, 1 TD, 2 INT
- GB – Aaron Rodgers – 27/35, 286 yards, 1 TD, 1 INT

Top rushers

- MIN – Adrian Peterson – 21 carries, 210 yards, 1 TD
- GB – James Starks – 15 carries, 66 yards, 1 TD

Top receivers

- MIN – Kyle Rudolph – 6 receptions, 51 yards, 1 TD
- GB – Randall Cobb – 6 receptions, 62 yards

Top tacklers

- MIN – Chad Greenway – 16 tackles
- GB – A. J. Hawk – 10 tackles

With their home victory over their bitter rival from Minnesota, the Packers won their fifth consecutive game against the Vikings and franchise-record tenth straight matchup against a division rival. Vikings RB Adrian Peterson was a major threat during the first half, and as a result the Vikings led 14–10 at halftime. However, the Packers were able to score 13 unanswered points in the second half and keep the Vikings in check for the remainder of the game, thereby winning 23–14 and dropping their rival to 6–6.

Upon winning, the team improved to 8–4 and retook the lead in the NFC North after the rival Chicago Bears lost to the Seattle Seahawks at home in overtime. This would also be the last time Rodgers would throw an interception at a home game until Week 5 of the 2015 season.

The Packers look to continue their division dominance by trying to extend their winning streak in Wisconsin against the Lions to 22 straight games (including the 1994 playoffs) on Sunday Night Football during Week 14.

=== Week 14 vs. Detroit Lions ===
Week Fourteen: Detroit Lions (4–8) at Green Bay Packers (8–4)

Quarter	1	2	3	4	Total
Lions	7	7	3	3	20
Packers	0	10	7	10	27

at Lambeau Field, Green Bay, Wisconsin

- Date: December 9, 2012
- Game time: 7:20 p.m. CST
- Game weather: Snow, 32 °F (0 °C)
- Game attendance: 70,382
- Referee: Tony Corrente
- TV announcers (NBC): Al Michaels, Cris Collinsworth and Michele Tafoya
- Gamebook

Game information

First quarter

- DET – Matthew Stafford 4-yard run (Jason Hanson kick), 7:16. Lions 7–0. Drive: 12 plays, 80 yards, 7:44.

Second quarter

- DET – Tony Scheffler 3-yard pass from Matthew Stafford, (Jason Hanson), 12:47. Lions 14–0. Drive: 11 plays, 79 yards, 5:48.
- GB – Mason Crosby 49-yard field goal, 10:52. Lions 14–3. Drive: 6 plays, 31 yards, 1:55.
- GB – Mike Daniels 43-yard fumble return (Mason Crosby kick), 6:15. Lions 14–10.

Third quarter

- GB – Aaron Rodgers 27-yard run, (Mason Crosby kick) 11:54. Packers 17–14. Drive: 8 plays, 74 yards, 3:06.
- DET – Jason Hanson 46-yard field goal, 8:57. Tie 17–17. Drive: 7 plays, 45 yards, 2:57.

Fourth quarter

- GB – DuJuan Harris 14-yard run (Mason Crosby kick), 10:45. Packers 24–17. Drive: 7 plays, 59 yards, 4:04.
- GB – Mason Crosby 41-yard field goal, 4:02. Packers 27–17. Drive: 7 plays, 40 yards, 3:09.
- DET – Jason Hanson 34-yard field goal, 0:07. Packers 27–20. Drive: 8 plays, 63 yards, 1:52.

Top passers

- DET – Matthew Stafford – 27/45, 264 yards, TD, INT
- GB – Aaron Rodgers – 14/24, 173 yards

Top rushers

- DET – Mikel Leshoure – 14 rushes, 49 yards
- GB – Alex Green – 13 rushes, 69 yards

Top receivers

- DET – Calvin Johnson – 10 receptions, 118 yards
- GB – Randall Cobb – 7 receptions, 102 yards

The Packers fell behind Detroit 14–0, but regained momentum when defensive lineman Mike Daniels returned a Lions fumble 43 yards for a touchdown, helping to put the Packers down only 14–10 at halftime. On their opening drive of the second half, Aaron Rodgers gave the Packers the lead for the first time with a 27-yard touchdown run. The Lions would tie the game 17–17 on a Jason Hanson field goal, and after both the Packers and the Lions would both miss field goals, the Packers finally got the lead for good on a 14-yard touchdown run by rookie DuJuan Harris. A Mason Crosby field goal gave the Packers a sure 27–17 lead with just over 4 minutes left in the game. The Lions would kick a field goal with 7 seconds left, but failed the onside kick attempt, giving the Packers a 27–20 win and eliminating the Lions from playoff contention. With a win against the rival Bears the following week, the Packers had the opportunity to clinch the NFC North division.

Will Ferrell was in attendance and led the crowd in a rendition of "Roll Out the Barrel".

=== Week 15: at Chicago Bears ===
Week Fifteen: Green Bay Packers at Chicago Bears – Game summary

Quarter	1	2	3	4	Total
Packers	0	14	7	0	21
Bears	0	7	3	3	13

at Soldier Field, Chicago, Illinois

- Date: December 16
- Game time: 12:00 pm. CST
- Game weather: 45 °F (7 °C), cloudy
- Game attendance: 62,534
- Referee: Walt Anderson
- TV announcers (Fox): Joe Buck, Troy Aikman and Pam Oliver
- Gamebook

Game information

First quarter

Second quarter

- CHI – Brandon Marshall 15 Yard TD Pass from Jay Cutler, Olindo Mare XP, (CHI 7–0)
- GB – James Jones 29 Yard TD Pass from Aaron Rodgers, Mason Crosby XP, (7–7)
- GB – James Jones 8 Yard TD Pass from Aaron Rodgers, Mason Crosby XP, (GB 14–7)

Third quarter

- GB – James Jones 6 Yard TD Pass from Aaron Rodgers, Mason Crosby XP, (GB 21–7)
- CHI – Olindo Mare 45 Yard FG, (GB 21–10)

Fourth quarter

- CHI – Olindo Mare 45 Yard FG, (GB 21–13)

Top passers

- GB – Aaron Rodgers – 23/36, 291 Yards, 3 TD
- CHI – Jay Cutler – 12/21, 135 Yards, TD, INT

Top rushers

- GB – Alex Green – 13 Rushes, 35 Yards
- CHI – Matt Forte – 20 Rushes, 69 Yards

Top receivers

- GB – Randall Cobb – 6 Receptions, 115 Yards
- CHI – Matt Forte – 5 Receptions, 64 Yards

Top tacklers

- GB – Brad Jones – 8 Tackles
- CHI – Lance Briggs – 9 Tackles

The Packers fell behind 7–0 to the Bears early in the 2nd quarter, but three consecutive Aaron Rodgers touchdown passes to James Jones gave the Packers a 21–7 lead midway through the third quarter. The Bears would pull to within 8 points late by way of two Olindo Mare field goals, but the Bears couldn't mount a comeback. With the 21–13 win, the Packers clinched the NFC North division title for a second season in a row and secured a playoff berth for the fourth consecutive season.

=== Week 16: vs. Tennessee Titans ===
Week Sixteen: Tennessee Titans at Green Bay Packers – Game summary

Quarter	1	2	3	4	Total
Titans	0	0	0	0	0
Packers	14	6	14	21	55

at Lambeau Field, Green Bay, Wisconsin

- Date: December 23
- Game time: 12:00 pm. CST
- Game weather: 24 °F (−4 °C), (Sunny)
- Game attendance: 70,508
- Referee: Clete Blakeman
- TV announcers (CBS): Greg Gumbel and Dan Dierdorf
- Gamebook

Game information

First quarter

- GB – Aaron Rodgers 6 yd. TD run, Mason Crosby XP good, 6:54 (GB 7–0)
- GB – Randall Cobb 20 Yard TD Pass from Aaron Rodgers, Mason Crosby XP good, 4:28 (GB 14–0)

Second quarter

- GB – Mason Crosby 26 Yard FG, 14:36 (GB 17–0)
- GB – Mason Crosby 48 Yard FG, 4:40 (GB 20–0)

Third quarter

- GB – DuJuan Harris 7 yd. TD run, Mason Crosby XP good, 12:04 (GB 27–0)
- GB – Greg Jennings 1 Yard TD Pass from Aaron Rodgers, Mason Crosby XP, 5:47 (GB 34–0)

Fourth quarter

- GB – James Jones 12 Yard TD Pass from Aaron Rodgers, Mason Crosby XP, 14:11 (GB 41–0)
- GB – Ryan Grant 7 yd. TD run, Mason Crosby XP good, 12:31 (GB 48–0)
- GB – Ryan Grant 9 yd. TD run, Mason Crosby XP good, 6:25 (GB 55–0)

Top passers

- TEN – Jake Locker – 13/30, 138 yards, 2 INTs
- GB – Aaron Rodgers – 27/38, 342 yards, 3 TDs

Top rushers

- TEN – Jake Locker – 4 carries, 32 yards
- GB – Ryan Grant – 20 carries, 80 yards, 2 TDs

Top receivers

- TEN – Kenny Britt – 2 receptions, 41 yards
- GB – James Jones – 7 receptions, 100 yards, 1 TD

Top tacklers

- TEN – Zach Brown – 9 tackles
- GB – Brad Jones – 10 tackles, 1 sack

With the win in their regular season home finale, the Packers improved to 11–4 on the season, 7–1 at home, and 3–1 against the AFC South by winning their first game against Tennessee since 1998, the final year the AFC franchise was referred to as the Oilers.

=== Week 17: at Minnesota Vikings ===
Week Seventeen: Green Bay Packers at Minnesota Vikings – Game summary

Quarter	1	2	3	4	Total
Packers	0	10	14	10	34
Vikings	10	10	7	10	37

at Mall of America Field at the Hubert H. Humphrey Metrodome, Minneapolis, Minnesota

- Date: December 30
- Game time: 3:25 pm. CST
- Game weather: Played indoors (dome stadium)
- Game attendance: 64,134
- Referee: Mike Carey
- TV announcers (Fox): Joe Buck, Troy Aikman and Pam Oliver
- Gamebook

Game information

First quarter

- MIN – Blair Walsh 54 yd. FG, 10:47 (MIN 3–0)
- MIN – Adrian Peterson 7 yd. TD run, Blair Walsh XP good, 5:44 (MIN 10–0)

Second quarter

- MIN – Blair Walsh 37 yd. FG, 14:51 (MIN 13–0)
- GB – Greg Jennings 3 yd. TD pass from Aaron Rodgers, Mason Crosby XP good, 4:01 (MIN 13–7)
- MIN – Jarius Wright 8 yd. TD pass from Christian Ponder, Blair Walsh XP good, 1:07 (MIN 20–7)
- GB – Mason Crosby 51 yd. FG, 0:00 (MIN 20–10)

Third quarter

- GB – Greg Jennings 5 yd. TD pass from Aaron Rodgers, Mason Crosby XP good, 11:56 (MIN 20–17)
- MIN – Adrian Peterson 2 yd. TD pass from Christian Ponder, Blair Walsh XP good, 4:00 (MIN 27–17)
- GB – James Jones 8 yd. TD pass from Aaron Rodgers, Mason Crosby XP good, 2:04 (MIN 27–24)

Fourth quarter

- GB – Mason Crosby 40 yd. FG, 12:21 (27–27)
- MIN – Michael Jenkins 3 yd. TD pass from Christian Ponder, Blair Walsh XP good, 7:54 (MIN 34–27)
- GB – Jordy Nelson 2 yd. TD pass from Aaron Rodgers, Mason Crosby XP good, 2:54 (34–34)
- MIN – Blair Walsh 29 yd. FG, 0:00 (MIN 37–34)

Top passers

- GB – Aaron Rodgers – 28/40, 365 yards, 4 TDs
- MIN – Christian Ponder – 16/28, 234 yards, 3 TDs

Top rushers

- GB – DuJuan Harris – 14 carries, 70 yards
- MIN – Adrian Peterson – 34 carries, 199 yards, 1 TD

Top receivers

- GB – Greg Jennings – 8 receptions, 120 yards, 2 TDs
- MIN – Jarius Wright – 3 receptions, 90 yards, 1 TD

Top tacklers

- GB – Morgan Burnett – 7 tackles
- MIN – E. J. Henderson – 7 tackles

With a 37–34 loss to the Vikings, the Packers failed to clinch the #2 overall seed in the NFC and a first round bye while finishing 11–5. The Packers loss set up a playoff re match between the Packers and the Vikings in the wild-card round of the playoffs. The Packers held Vikings RB Adrian Peterson 9 yards short of breaking the NFL regular season rushing record (2105 yards). The Packers' 12-game winning streak against division rivals was snapped as they lost their first game vs. a rival since their 7–3 loss to the Lions in Week 14 of the 2010 season. Also, the loss to the Vikings killed the Packers' chance of having a perfect record against division rivals for the second season in a row, as well as losing their 5-game winning streak vs. the Vikings.

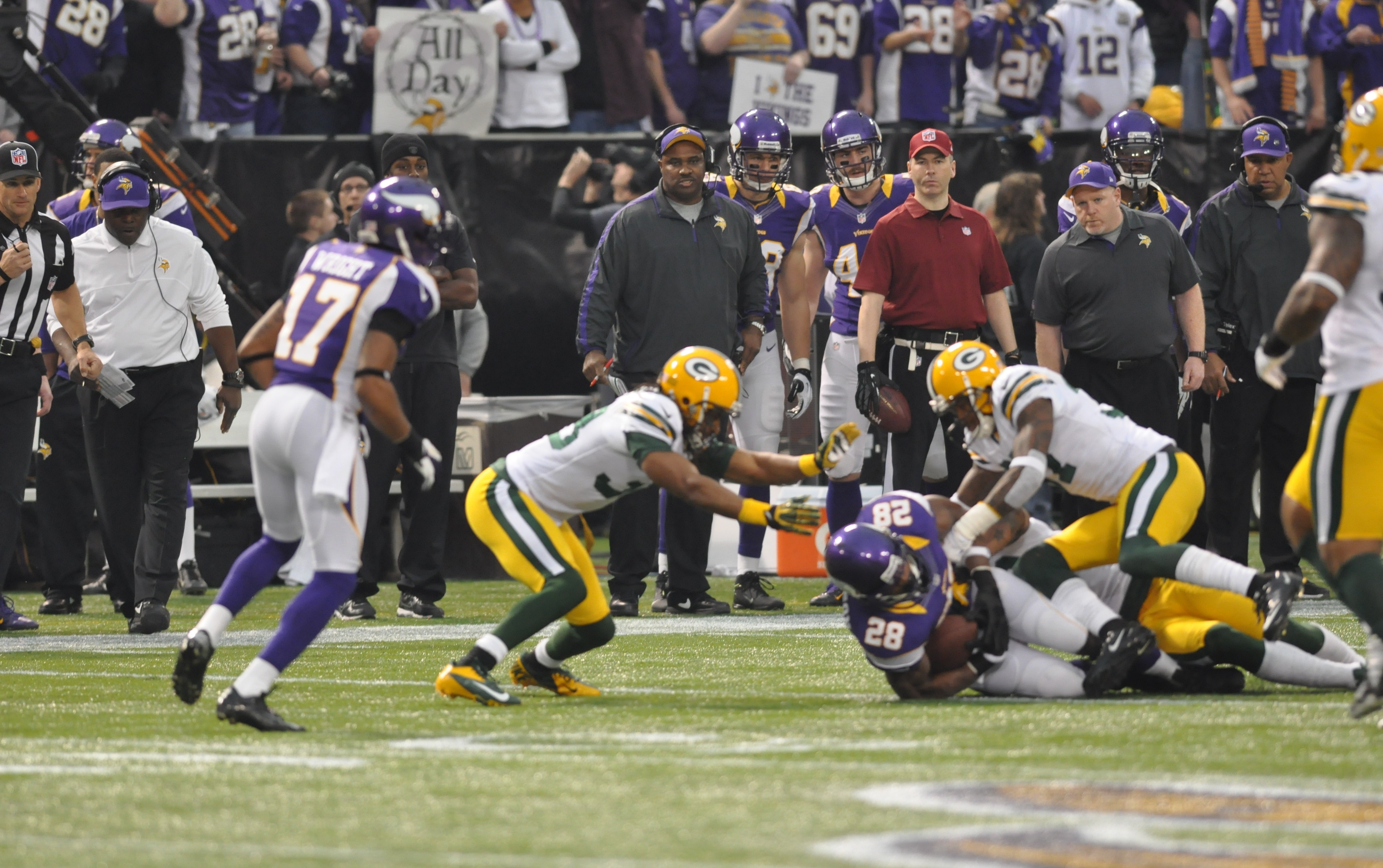
Green Bay at Minnesota in week 17

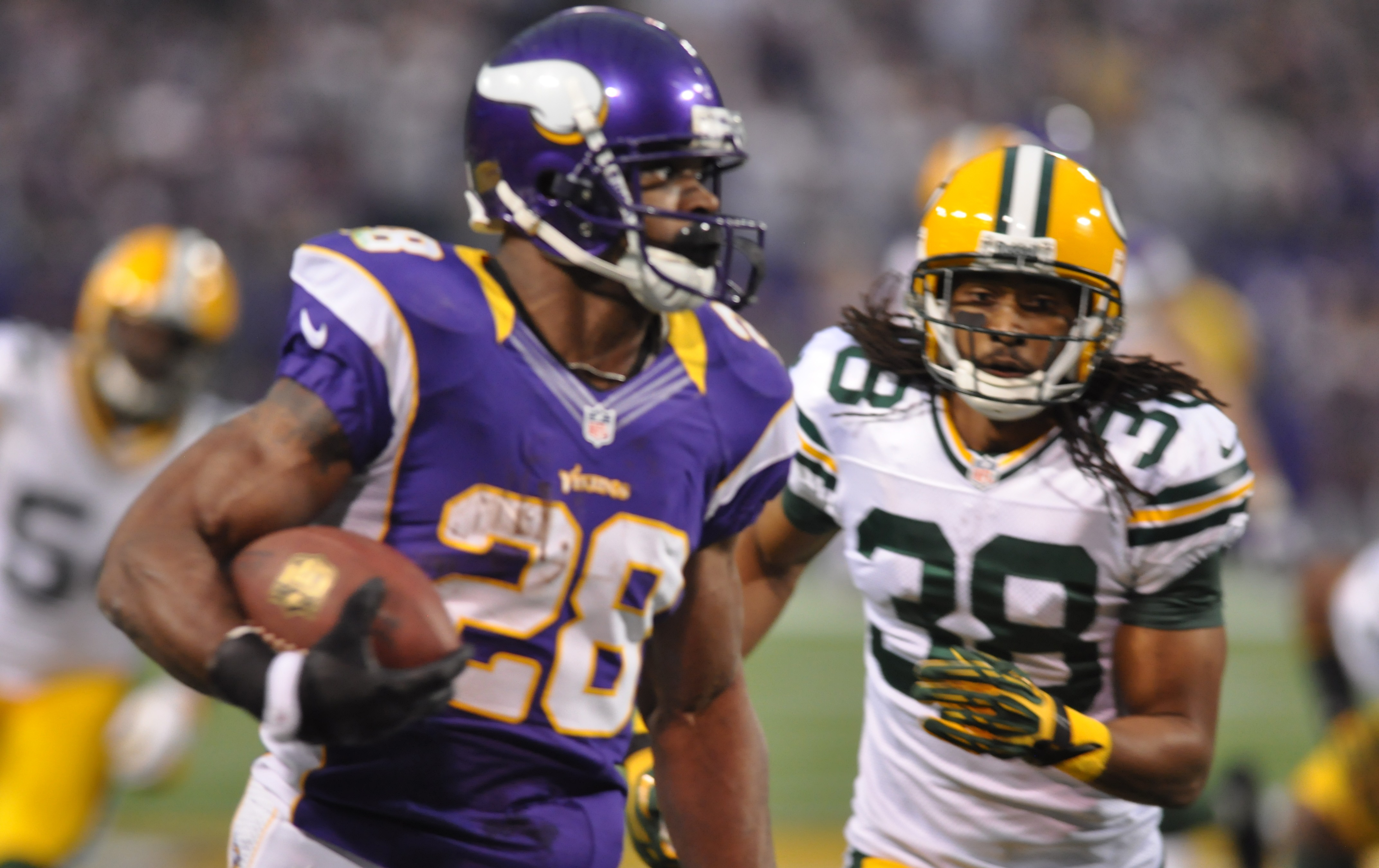
Tramon Williams chases Adrian Peterson of Minnesota

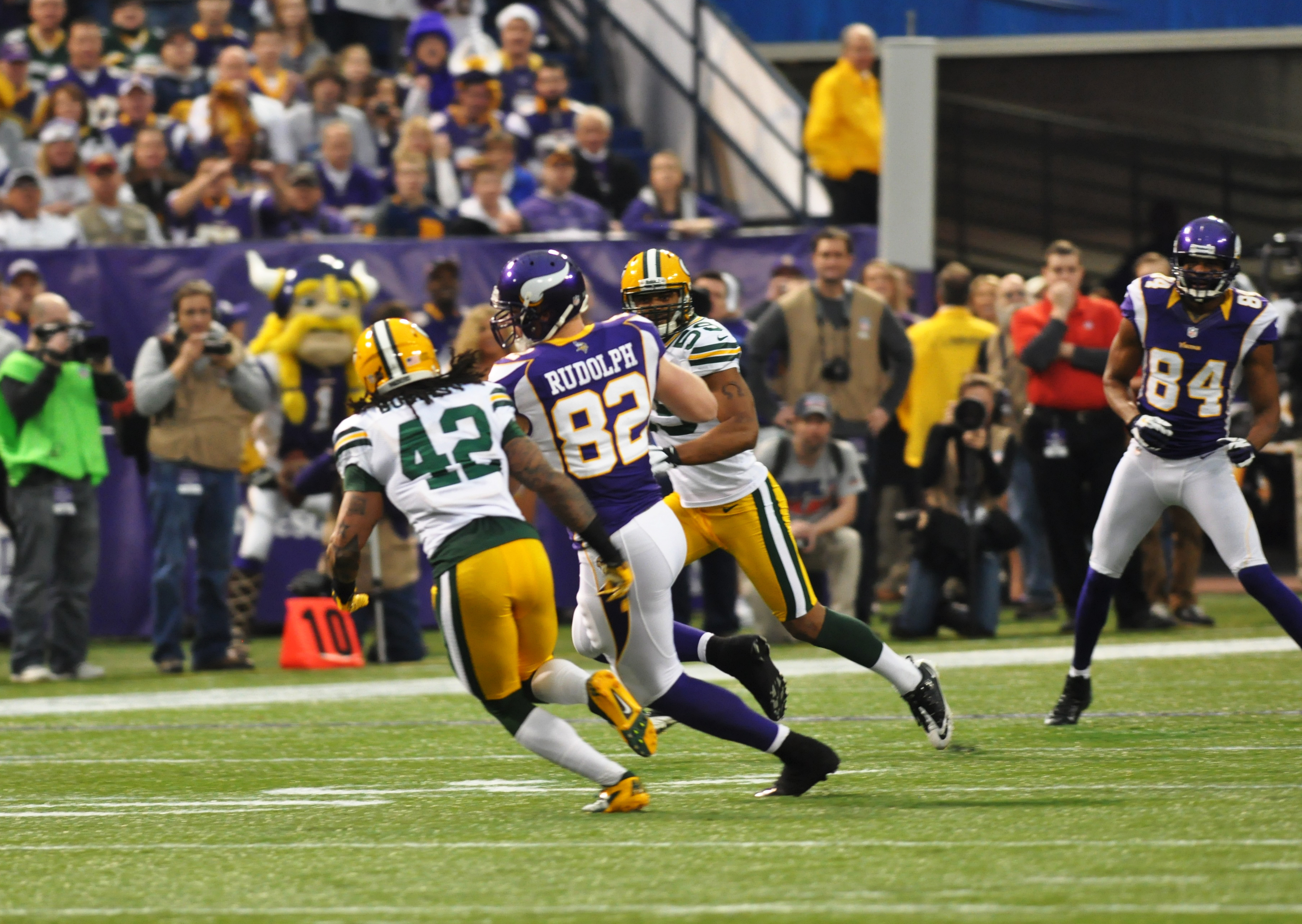
Morgan Burnett challenges Kyle Rudolph in the week 17 contest

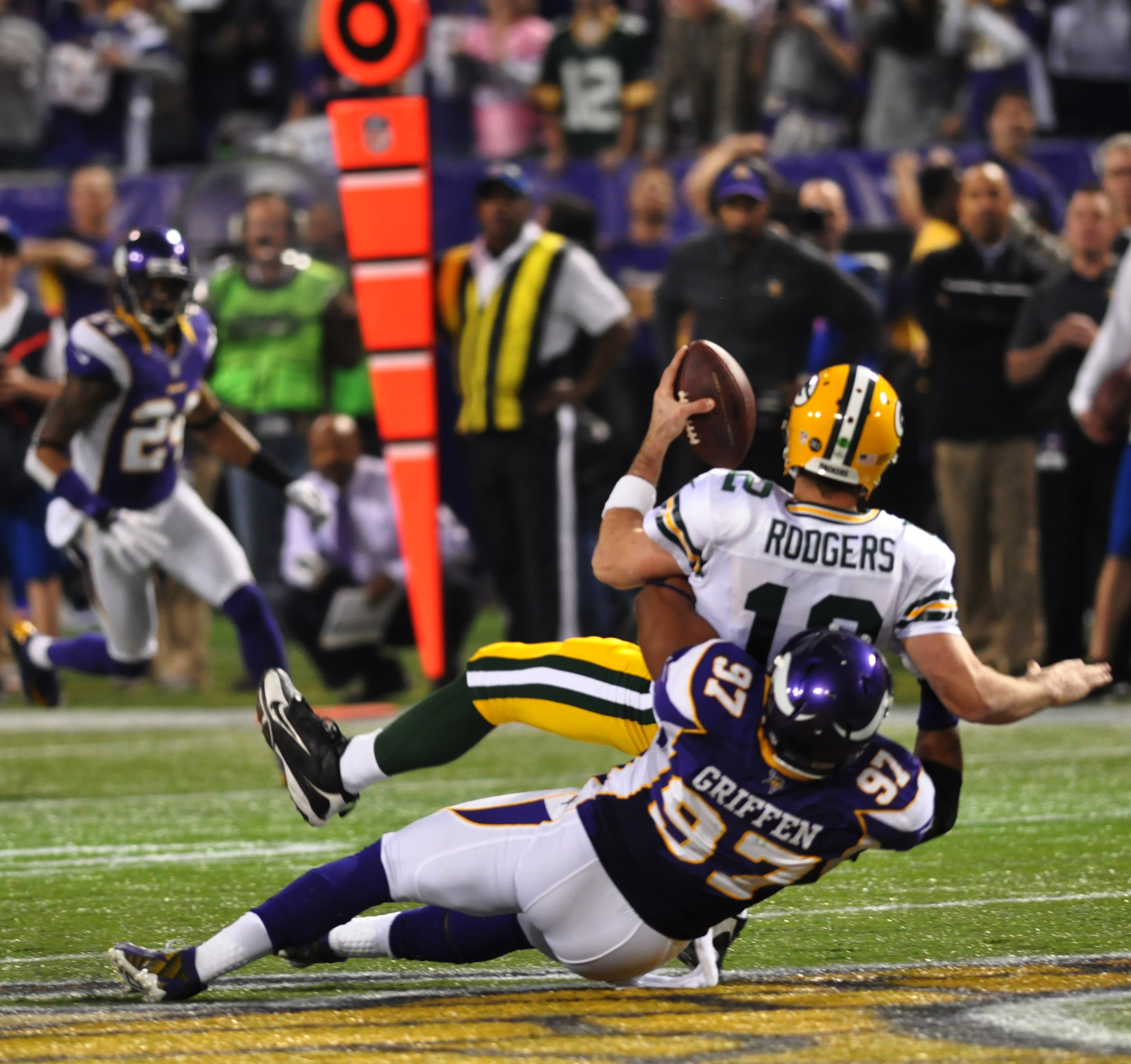
Aaron Rodgers is sacked by Everson Griffen

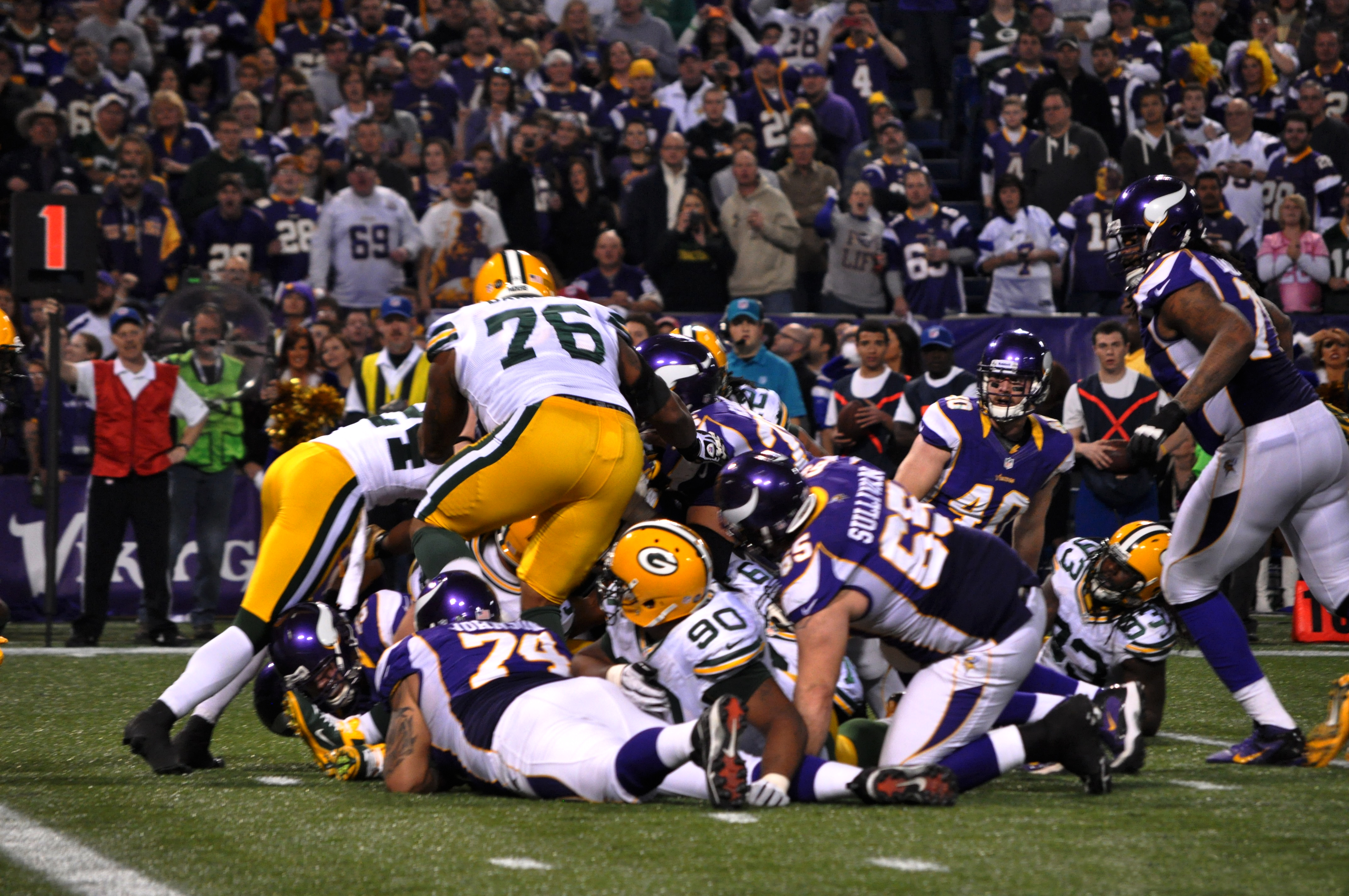
Green Bay at Minnesota, week 17

== Postseason (Playoffs) ==
By virtue of clinching the NFC North division title the Packers hosted a playoff game in the wild-card round. The Packers' win against the Titans in Week 16 guaranteed at least the 3rd seed in the NFC; However, the Packers fell short of the #2 seed and a first round bye by failing to win in Week 17 over the Vikings.

=== NFC Wildcard Round: vs. Minnesota Vikings ===
NFC Wildcard Round: Minnesota Vikings at Green Bay Packers – Game summary

Quarter	1	2	3	4	Total
Vikings	3	0	0	7	10
Packers	7	10	7	0	24

at Lambeau Field, Green Bay, Wisconsin

- Date: January 5
- Game time: 7:00 pm. CST
- Game weather: 29 °F (−2 °C), cloudy
- Game attendance: 71,548
- Referee: Scott Green
- TV announcers (NBC): Al Michaels, Cris Collinsworth and Michele Tafoya
- Gamebook

Game information

First quarter

- MIN – Blair Walsh 33 yd. FG, 9:26 (MIN 3–0)
- GB – DuJuan Harris 9 yd. TD run, Mason Crosby XP good, 0:28 (GB 7–3)

Second quarter

- GB – Mason Crosby 2- yd. FG, 3:25 (GB 10–3)
- GB – John Kuhn 3 yd. TD run, Mason Crosby XP good, 9:25 (GB 17–3)

Third quarter

- GB – John Kuhn 9 yd. TD pass from Aaron Rodgers, Mason Crosby XP good, 9:25 (GB 24–3)

Fourth quarter

- MIN – Michael Jenkins 50 yd. TD pass from Joe Webb, Blair Walsh XP good, 3:39 (GB 24–10)

Top passers

- MIN – Joe Webb – 11/30, 180 yards, 1 TD, 1 INT
- GB – Aaron Rodgers – 23/33, 274 yards, 1 TD

Top rushers

- MIN – Adrian Peterson – 22 carries, 99 yards
- GB – DuJuan Harris – 17 carries, 47 yards, 1 TD

Top receivers

- MIN – Michael Jenkins – 3 receptions, 96 yards, 1 TD
- GB – Greg Jennings – 4 receptions, 61 yards

Top tacklers

- MIN – Chad Greenway – 11 tackles
- GB – Sam Shields – 7 tackles

After trailing early in the first quarter, the Packers were able to score 24 consecutive points to get their first playoff win since Super Bowl XLV and first home playoff victory since 2007.

=== NFC Divisional Playoff Game: at San Francisco 49ers ===
NFC Divisional Playoff Game: Green Bay Packers at San Francisco 49ers – Game summary

Quarter	1	2	3	4	Total
Packers	14	7	3	7	31
49ers	7	17	7	14	45

at Candlestick Park, San Francisco, California

- Date: January 12, 2013
- Game time: 7:00 pm. CST/5:00 p.m. PST
- Game weather: 48 °F (9 °C), cloudy
- Game attendance: 69,732
- Referee: Jerome Boger
- TV announcers (Fox): Joe Buck, Troy Aikman, Pam Oliver and Erin Andrews
- Gamebook

Game information

First quarter

- GB – Sam Shields 52 yd. Int. return TD, Mason Crosby XP good, 12:48 (GB 7–0)
- SF – Colin Kaepernick 20 yd. TD run, David Akers XP good, 09:01 (7–7)
- GB – DuJuan Harris 18 yd. TD run, Mason Crosby XP good, 00:29 (GB 14–7)

Second quarter

- SF – Michael Crabtree 12 yd. TD pass from Colin Kaepernick, David Akers XP good, 10:59 (14–14)
- SF – Michael Crabtree 20 yd. TD pass from Colin Kaepernick, David Akers XP good, 05:26 (SF 21–14)
- GB – James Jones 20 yd. TD pass from Aaron Rodgers, Mason Crosby XP good, 02:33 (21–21)
- SF – David Akers 36- yd. FG, 00:00 (SF 24–21)

Third quarter

- GB – Mason Crosby 31- yd. FG, 08:25 (24–24)
- SF – Colin Kaepernick 56 yd. TD run, David Akers XP good, 07:07 (SF 31–24)

Fourth quarter

- SF – Frank Gore 2 yd. TD run, David Akers XP good, 14:57 (SF 38–24)
- SF – Anthony Dixon 2 yd. TD run, David Akers XP good, 03:34 (SF 45–24)
- GB – Greg Jennings 3 yd. TD pass from Aaron Rodgers, Mason Crosby XP good, 00:57 (SF 45–31)

Top passers

- GB – Aaron Rodgers – 26/39, 257 yards, 2 TD, 1 INT
- SF – Colin Kaepernick – 17/31, 263 yards, 2 TD, 1 INT

Top rushers

- GB – DuJuan Harris – 11 carries, 53 yards, 1 TD
- SF – Colin Kaepernick – 16 carries, 181 yards, 2 TD

Top receivers

- GB – Greg Jennings – 6 receptions, 54 yards, 1 TD
- SF – Michael Crabtree – 9 receptions, 119 yards, 2 TD

Top tacklers

- GB – Brad Jones – 9 tackles
- SF – Patrick Willis – 7 tackles, 1 sack

With the loss, the Packers ended their season with an overall record of 12–6. This marked the final game for longtime wide receiver Donald Driver, who announced his retirement after the season.

== Statistics ==
=== Regular season statistical leaders ===
	Player(s)	Value
Passing yards	Aaron Rodgers	4,295 Yards
Passing touchdowns	Aaron Rodgers	39 TDs
Rushing yards	Alex Green	464 Yards
Rushing touchdowns	Aaron Rodgers, DuJuan Harris and Ryan Grant	2 TDs
Receptions	Randall Cobb	80 Receptions
Receiving yards	Randall Cobb	954 Yards
Receiving touchdowns	James Jones	14 TDs
Points	Mason Crosby	103 Points
Kickoff Return Yards	Randall Cobb	964 Yards
Punt return Yards	Randall Cobb	292 Yards
Tackles	A. J. Hawk and Morgan Burnett	116 Tackles
Sacks	Clay Matthews	13 Sacks
Interceptions	Casey Hayward	6 INTs

statistical values are correct through Week 17.

=== Best game performances ===
	Player(s)	Value	Opponent
Passing yards	Aaron Rodgers	365 Yards	@ Minnesota Vikings
Passing touchdowns	Aaron Rodgers	6 TDs	@ Houston Texans
Rushing yards	Cedric Benson	84 Yards	New Orleans Saints
Rushing touchdowns	Ryan Grant	2 TDs	Tennessee Titans
Receiving yards	Jordy Nelson	122 Yards	@ St. Louis Rams
Receiving touchdowns	Jordy Nelson and James Jones	3 TDs	@ Houston Texans and @ Chicago Bears
Points	Jordy Nelson and James Jones	18 Points	@ Houston Texans and @ Chicago Bears
Tackles	Morgan Burnett	14 Tackles	New Orleans Saints
Sacks	Clay Matthews	3.5 Sacks	Chicago Bears
Interceptions	Tramon Williams, Casey Hayward and Morgan Burnett	2 INTs	Chicago Bears, @ Houston Texans and Minnesota Vikings

statistical values are correct through Week 17.

=== Statistical league rankings ===
- Total Offense (YPG): 13th
- Passing (YPG): 10th
- Rushing (YPG): 20th
- Points (PPG): 7th
- Total Defense (YPG): 10th
- Passing (YPG):12th
- Rushing (YPG): 14th
- Points (PPG): 7th

Stats correct through December 24, 2012

== Awards and records ==
=== Awards ===
==== Weekly awards ====
- P Tim Masthay was named NFC Special Teams Player of the Week for games played during Week 2. (vs. Bears)
- QB Aaron Rodgers was named NFC Offensive Player of the Week for games played during Week 4. (vs. Saints)
- QB Aaron Rodgers was named the winner of the Never Say Die moment of the week for games played during Week 4. (vs. Saints)
- QB Aaron Rodgers was named NFC Offensive Player of the Week for games played during Week 6. (@ Texans)
- CB Davon House was named NFC Special Teams Player of the Week for games played during Week 8. (vs. Jaguars)

==== Monthly awards ====
- QB Aaron Rodgers was named NFC Offensive Player of the Month for the month of October.
- CB Casey Hayward was named NFL Defensive Rookie of the Month for the month of October.

=== Records ===
==== Individual ====
===== Game =====
- QB Aaron Rodgers tied Matt Flynn for the Packers record of Most touchdown passes, game with 6 vs the Houston Texans.

===== Season =====
- WR Randall Cobb set the Packers single-season record for all-purpose yards with 2,342 yards.

===== Career =====
- QB Aaron Rodgers passed Bart Starr for second place on the Packers Career Touchdown Passes list in week 8 vs the Jacksonville Jaguars.
- WR Donald Driver passed Bart Starr for second place on the Packers Career Games Played list in week 5 vs the Indianapolis Colts.
