= M. D. Jennings =

American football player (born 1988)

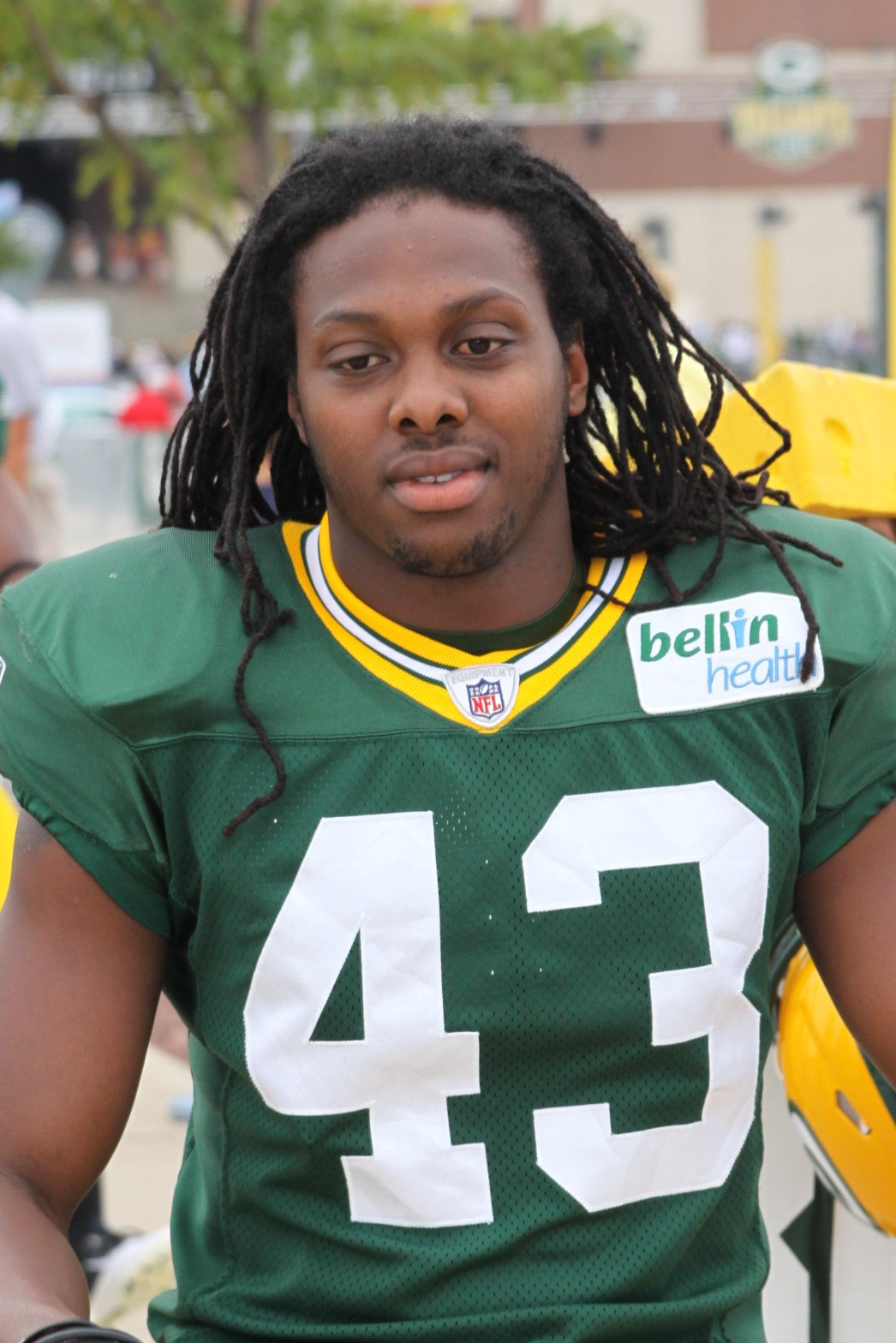
- Jennings with the Green Bay Packers in 2011

No. 43
- Position: Safety

Personal information
- Born: July 25, 1988 (age 38); Grenada, Mississippi, U.S.
- Listed height: 6 ft 0 in (1.83 m)
- Listed weight: 187 lb (85 kg)

Career information
- High school: Calhoun City (MS)
- College: Arkansas State
- NFL draft: 2011: undrafted

Career history
- Green Bay Packers (2011–2013); Chicago Bears (2014)*; Tampa Bay Buccaneers (2015)*
- * Offseason or practice squad member only

Awards and highlights
- First-team All-Sun Belt (2010)

Career NFL statistics
- Total tackles: 133
- Sacks: 1
- Fumble recoveries: 1
- Interceptions: 1
- Defensive touchdowns: 2
- Stats at Pro Football Reference

Melvin Delanie Jennings (born July 25, 1988) is an American former professional football player who was a safety in the National Football League (NFL). He played college football for the Arkansas State Red Wolves and was signed by the Green Bay Packers as an undrafted free agent in 2011.

== Early life ==
Jennings was born in Grenada, Mississippi, and attended Calhoun City High School. During his time there, he lettered in football, baseball, and track and field. As a football player, he played safety and wide receiver. During his junior year, he made 70 tackles and eight interceptions, which earned him second-team all-state honors. As a senior, he earned first-team all-state honors after turning in 70 tackles, five interceptions and 15 defended passes. He ranked fifth in his graduating class in academics, and also received the United States National Minority Leadership Award.

== College career ==
=== Recruiting ===
Jennings was not highly recruited coming out of high school and was given a two star rating by Rivals.com. He measured in at 5′ 11″ and weighed 160 pounds. He ran the forty-yard dash in 4.55 seconds, and had a 31-inch vertical. He received one scholarship offer Arkansas State, but was also scouted by Mississippi State, Mississippi, and Southern Mississippi.

=== Arkansas State ===
Jennings ultimately took the offer and decided to play for the Arkansas State Red Wolves. During his first year for the team, he received a redshirt and participated on the scout team.

Going into the next year, Jennings played in twelve games as a backup. He had his first career sack against the SMU Mustangs, and his first career interception against the Troy Trojans. Additionally, he had multiple tackles in eight different games and finished the season with twenty-six tackles.

During his sophomore year, Jennings started every game at the safety position. During a game against Southern Miss, he had a career-high 13 tackles. He had one more game with double-digit tackles. Jennings finished the year with a team-leading three interceptions, five defended passes, a forced fumble, and 67 tackles.

Jennings played in twelve games during his junior year. He had a season-high eleven tackles in a game against Louisville and had at least eight tackles in five more games. He was forced to sit out the last game of the year due to an injury. Regardless of missing the game, he was still named First-team All-Sun Belt Conference by Phil Steele. He was also named to the Arkansas State Athletic Director's Honor Roll and the Sun Belt Conference Academic Honor roll. He had 64 tackles (37 solo), an interception, six passes defensed and a team-high three fumble recoveries.

In his final year with the Red Wolves, Jennings once again started every game that year. He was named the Sun-Belt defensive player of the week during the season opening loss against the 22nd-ranked and eventual national champion Auburn Tigers. During that game he had 11 tackles, including one and a half for a loss, a sack against quarterback Cam Newton, and a forced fumble and recovery. At the end of the year, he was awarded first-team All-Sun Belt honors finishing the season with a career-high 84 tackles (38 solo), and three interceptions. He finished his career with 241 tackles, including seven and a half for loss, eight interceptions and 15 defended passes.

== Professional career ==
=== Pre-draft ===
Jennings was expected to be drafted in the 2011 NFL Draft and did not receive an invitation to the NFL Combine. In an interview with New Era Scouting, Jennings said he believed his best talents were his knowledge and ability to learn quickly, and that he had good speed. He said his personal goal was to play at the NFL at a strong level for ten or more years. He trained for the draft in Huntsville, Alabama with Body Creation. Scouts stated that Jennings has a fluid, agile back who played from sideline to sideline, and that he possessed good ball skills. They also believed that he had a good sense of timing and that he fought hard to defend passes. However, scouts also said that he lacked the size to be a safety and was built more like a cornerback, and that he did not hit very hard.

Pre-draft measurables
Height	Weight	40-yard dash	10-yard split	20-yard split	Three-cone drill	Vertical jump	Broad jump	Bench press
5 ft 11 3/4 in (1.82 m)	187 lb (85 kg)	4.48 s	1.62 s	2.66 s	7.18 s	35.5 in (0.90 m)	10 ft 5 in (3.18 m)	10 reps
All values from Arkansas State's Pro Day

=== Green Bay Packers ===
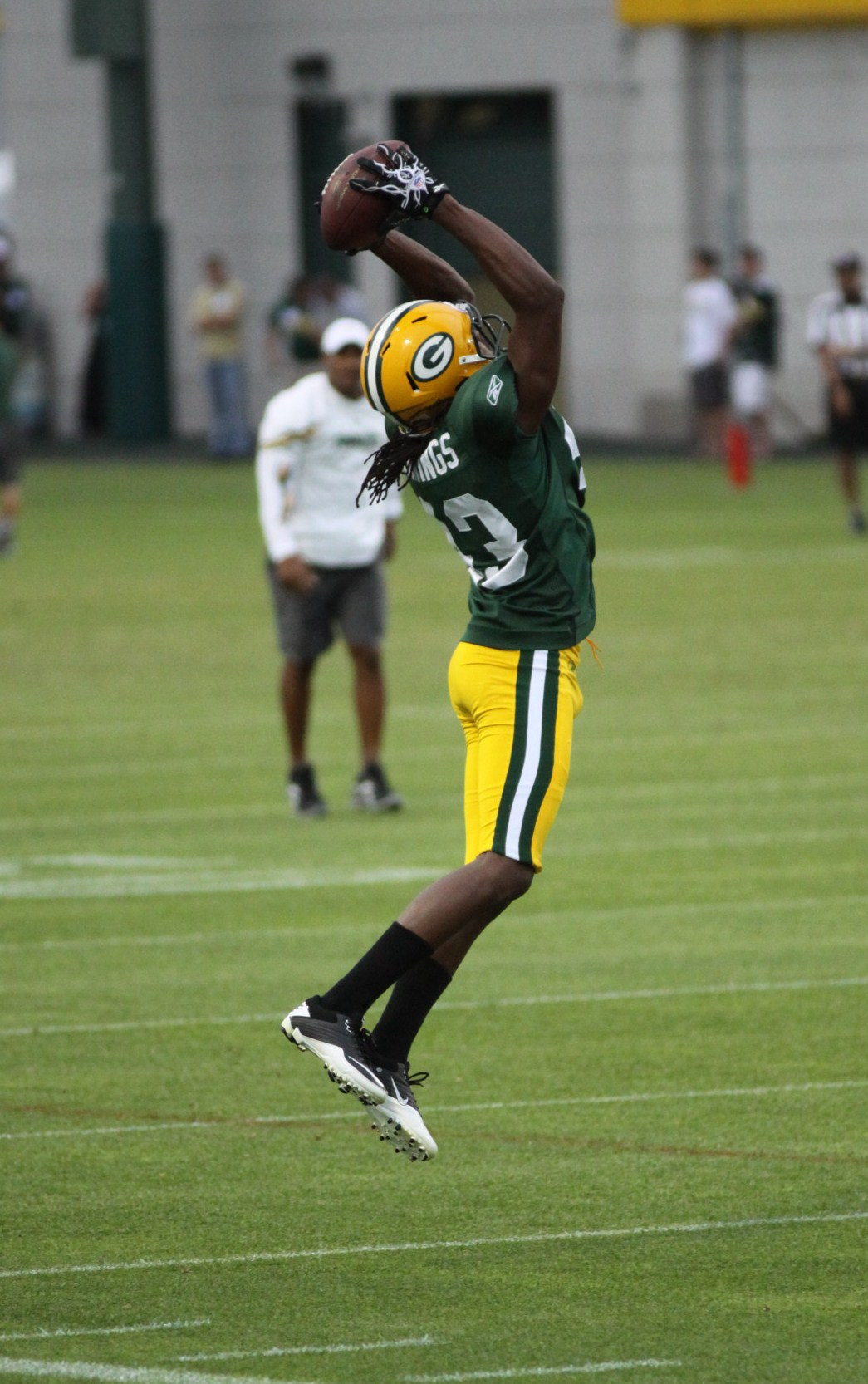
M. D. Jennings on August 5, 2011

Jennings went undrafted in the 2011 NFL draft, and according to his agent, was heavily pursued and signed by the Green Bay Packers. Had he not been signed after the draft, his high school had offered him a job as a teacher and a coach. However, due to the NFL lockout at the time he was not able to sign his rookie contract until three months later. During the preseason of his rookie year, in a game against the Cleveland Browns, he intercepted a pass by future teammate Seneca Wallace which he believed was a factor in making the team. Later on during the preseason, he recovered an onside kick against the Indianapolis Colts. During his first year with the team, he played primarily on special teams, only receiving 10 snaps on defense during the year. Jennings had eight tackles playing on special teams during the regular season.

Jennings was involved in a controversial call at the end of a September 24, 2012, game against the Seattle Seahawks on Monday Night Football. On the final play of the game, Jennings appeared to intercept Russell Wilson's Hail Mary pass intended for Seahawks wide receiver Golden Tate. Tate then took the ball out of Jennings's hands, but the officials ruled that both Tate and Jennings had simultaneous possession of the ball. In an incorrect interpretation of the simultaneous possession rule, the touchdown was awarded to Tate by the replacement officials with no time remaining, and Seattle won the game 14–12. The play eventually would be known as the Fail Mary. The public outrage over the controversial ending followed weeks of criticism regarding the quality of officiating by replacement officials employed by the NFL during the 2012 referee lockout.

On November 18, 2012, Jennings returned an interception against the Detroit Lions 72 yards, making this his first official interception and first touchdown.

Jennings was set to become a restricted free agent after the 2013 season, but the Packers did not make a qualifying offer, and he became an unrestricted free agent.

=== Chicago Bears ===
On March 12, 2014, Jennings was signed by the Chicago Bears.

=== Tampa Bay Buccaneers ===
On January 5, 2015, Jennings was signed by the Tampa Bay Buccaneers. He was waived by the team on May 12.

== NFL career statistics ==
Legend
	Led the league
**Bold**	Career high

=== Regular season ===
Year	Team	Games		Tackles					Interceptions					Fumbles			
Year	Team	GP	GS	Cmb	Solo	Ast	Sck	TFL	Int	Yds	TD	Lng	PD	FF	FR	Yds	TD
2011	GNB	15	0	7	5	2	0.0	0	0	0	0	0	0	0	0	0	0
2012	GNB	**16**	10	52	39	13	0.0	0	**1**	**72**	**1**	**72**	**2**	0	0	0	0
2013	GNB	**16**	**16**	**74**	**56**	**18**	**1.0**	**4**	0	0	0	0	1	0	**1**	**24**	**1**
		47	26	133	100	33	1.0	4	1	72	1	72	3	0	1	24	1

=== Playoffs ===
Year	Team	Games		Tackles					Interceptions					Fumbles			
Year	Team	GP	GS	Cmb	Solo	Ast	Sck	TFL	Int	Yds	TD	Lng	PD	FF	FR	Yds	TD
2011	GNB	1	0	0	0	0	0.0	0	0	0	0	0	0	0	0	0	0
2012	GNB	**2**	0	**6**	**4**	**2**	0.0	0	0	0	0	0	0	0	0	0	0
2013	GNB	1	1	3	3	0	0.0	0	0	0	0	0	0	0	0	0	0
		4	1	9	7	2	0.0	0	0	0	0	0	0	0	0	0	0
