= Jarrett Bush =

American gridiron football player (born 1984)

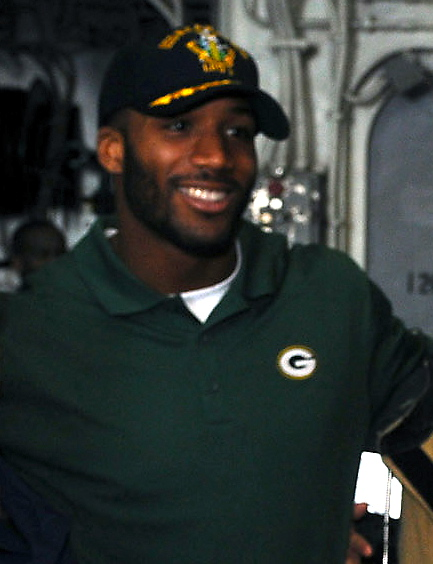
- Bush in 2011

No. 24
- Position: Cornerback

Personal information
- Born: May 21, 1984 (age 42); Vacaville, California, U.S.
- Listed height: 6 ft 0 in (1.83 m)
- Listed weight: 200 lb (91 kg)

Career information
- High school: Will C. Wood (Vacaville)
- College: Utah State
- NFL draft: 2006: undrafted

Career history
- Carolina Panthers (2006)*; Green Bay Packers (2006–2014); Calgary Stampeders (2016–2017)
- * Offseason or practice squad member only

Awards and highlights
- Super Bowl champion (XLV)

Career NFL statistics
- Total tackles: 181
- Sacks: 1.5
- Forced fumbles: 1
- Fumble recoveries: 4
- Interceptions: 4
- Stats at Pro Football Reference
- Stats at CFL.ca

Jarrett Lee Bush (born May 21, 1984) is an American former professional football player who was a cornerback in the National Football League (NFL). He was originally signed by the Carolina Panthers as an undrafted free agent in 2006, but was claimed by the Green Bay Packers as a waiver-wire pickup following the 2006 preseason and has played through the 2014 regular season. With Green Bay, Bush won Super Bowl XLV over the Pittsburgh Steelers. Bush also played for the Calgary Stampeders of the Canadian Football League (CFL). He played college football at Utah State and American River College.

== Early life ==
Bush attended Vaca Pena Middle School and Will C. Wood High School in Vacaville, California. He played both defensive back and wide receiver.

== Professional career ==
=== Carolina Panthers ===
Bush was originally with the Carolina Panthers as an undrafted free agent in 2006, but was waived following the preseason.

=== Green Bay Packers ===
Bush was claimed off of waivers by the Green Bay Packers one day after being cut by Carolina. He played mainly as a third or fourth cornerback and on special teams during his career with the Packers.

On March 13, 2009, the Tennessee Titans signed Bush to an offer sheet. The Packers matched the Titans offer on March 16.

On February 6, 2011, during Super Bowl XLV, after Pro-Bowl cornerback Charles Woodson suffered a broken collar bone, Bush would have to fill a cornerback slot as well as continue his special teams duties. In the second quarter, the Pittsburgh Steelers were on the Green Bay 49 yard line with a 2nd and 11. Bush made a great read and drove on a Ben Roethlisberger pass intended for Michael Wallace over the middle, resulting in the Packers second interception of the game. This would prove pivotal in the game, as the ensuing drive resulted with a touchdown pass from Aaron Rodgers to Greg Jennings. Bush ended Super Bowl XLV with one interception, one hit on quarterback, one pass defended, and five total tackles of which four were solo.

Following the 2014 season, the Packers did not re-sign Bush. Bush was then suspended by the NFL for 10 games for an illegal substance violation. No other NFL team signed Bush following the suspension.

=== Calgary Stampeders ===
Bush signed with Calgary's practice roster on November 10, 2016, the same day the Stampeders signed Bush's former Packer teammate Jarrett Boykin. Bush made the active roster for the 2017 CFL season, and recorded 2 special teams tackles during his first game played, but was demoted back to the practice roster after two weeks. After two more weeks on the practice roster, Bush was released on July 18. This was to make room for Reggie Begelton, a wide receiver who had been cut by Calgary after sustaining an injury in the preseason.

=== Statistics ===
Year	Team	GP	COMB	TOTAL	AST	SACK	FF	FR	FR YDS	INT	IR YDS	AVG IR	LNG	TD	PD
2006	GB	16	10	9	1	0.0	0	0	0	0	0	0	0	0	0
2007	GB	14	30	24	6	0.0	1	0	0	0	0	0	0	0	7
2008	GB	16	11	10	1	0.0	0	0	0	0	0	0	0	0	1
2009	GB	16	28	25	3	0.0	0	0	0	1	3	3	3	0	7
2010	GB	16	21	19	2	0.0	2	1	0	0	0	0	0	0	1
2011	GB	16	30	26	4	1.5	0	0	0	2	39	20	35	0	6
2012	GB	16	20	16	4	0.0	0	1	0	0	0	0	0	0	0
2013	GB	12	13	10	3	0.0	0	0	0	1	0	0	0	0	5
2014	GB	15	16	11	5	0.0	0	0	0	0	0	0	0	0	1
Total	Total	137	179	159	29	1.5	3	2	0	4	42	11	35	0	28
