= Brad Jones (American football) =

American football player (born 1986)

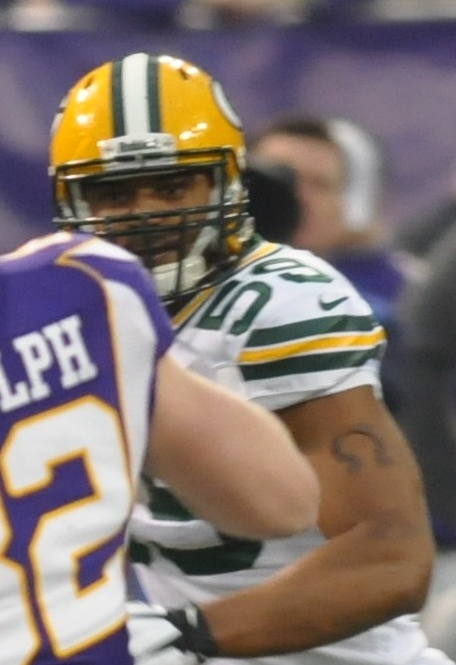
- Jones with the Green Bay Packers in 2012

No. 59, 52
- Position: Linebacker

Personal information
- Born: April 1, 1986 (age 40); Lansing, Michigan, U.S.
- Listed height: 6 ft 3 in (1.91 m)
- Listed weight: 247 lb (112 kg)

Career information
- High school: East Lansing (East Lansing, Michigan)
- College: Colorado
- NFL draft: 2009: 7th round, 218th overall pick

Career history
- Green Bay Packers (2009–2014); Philadelphia Eagles (2015)

Awards and highlights
- Super Bowl champion (XLV)

Career NFL statistics
- Total tackles: 263
- Sacks: 10
- Forced fumbles: 2
- Fumble recoveries: 1
- Stats at Pro Football Reference

Bradley Edward Jones (born April 1, 1986) is an American former professional football player who was a linebacker in the National Football League (NFL). He was selected by the Green Bay Packers in the seventh round of the 2009 NFL draft, and played college football for the Colorado Buffaloes. With the Packers, he was part of their Super Bowl XLV team that beat the Pittsburgh Steelers.

== Early life ==
Jones played football for East Lansing High School from 2000-2003. As a senior captain and team MVP, Jones was a First-team All-State selection and All-state Dream Team performer by the Detroit Free Press, when the Lansing State Journal also named him the Defensive Player of the Year. During his senior and junior years he earned First-team All-Conference (Capitol Area Athletic Conference), All-area and All-area Dream Team honors by the Lansing State Journal. The Detroit Free Press made him an All-State special mention honoree his junior year, as he also earned a spot on the First-team All-conference when he was a sophomore.

As a senior, he recorded 117 total tackles (79 solo), 18 tackles for loss, 11 sacks, two fumble recoveries (including one for a 70-yard touchdown), five forced fumbles, four interceptions (with one going for a 30-yard touchdown), 15 quarterback hurries and six pass deflections. On offense, where he also started at tight end, he reeled in 27 passes and five touchdowns for 501 yards. As a junior and dual starter once again, he compiled 110 total tackles (62 solo), 11 stuffs for loss, five sacks, four fumble recoveries, two forced fumbles, two interceptions, five quarterback pressures, three pass breakups and one blocked field goal. He also caught 12 balls and one touchdown totaling 280 yards. During his sophomore season, he finished with 99 total stops (42 solo), six tackles for loss, two sacks, one recovered fumble, one interception, three quarterback hurries and one pass deflection, while also netting one reception for 30 yards. East Lansing was the 9-2 conference champs his senior year, 6-4 his junior season and 13-1 his sophomore year, losing in the second round of the state playoffs.

In addition to football, he lettered four years in track & field, where he competed in the 200-meter dash (21.7 career-best) and the 110m hurdles (14.32 career-best), earning All-area and All-regional runner-up honors as a junior. He also played basketball as a freshman and sophomore.

== College career ==
In 2008 Jones started all 12 games at outside linebacker, earning honorable mention All-Big 12; He was CU’s co-defensive player of the year, as selected by the coaches (Dave Jones Award). He racked up 78 tackles, of which 48 were solo and 14 for losses, including seven sacks. He also led the team in quarterback hurries with 14 and also forced two fumbles, had a pass breakup and three chasedowns (near sacks). In 2007, he started all 13 games including the Independence Bowl at the “sam” outside linebacker position, and posted 72 tackles on the year (45 solo), with six for losses including a pair of quarterback sacks. He also had nine third down stops, seven hurries, five tackles for zero and three passes broken up. In 2006, he played in all 12 games, starting 11 and he finished third on the team in tackles with 72 (41 solo). Though he had a season-low two stops at Kansas, he did make his first career interception against the Jayhawks. He had six third down stops on the season, and he was credited with half a quarterback sack against Iowa State, the first of his career. He also had two hurries and a pass broken up. In 2005, he played in all 13 games, including the Champs Sports Bowl (no starts), making 20 tackles on the year, including 16 solo and one for a loss, to go with two third down stops, a quarterback hurry and pass broken up. In 2004, he redshirted.

== Professional career ==
Pre-draft measurables
Height	Weight	40-yard dash	20-yard shuttle	Three-cone drill	Vertical jump	Broad jump	Bench press
6 ft 3 in (1.91 m)	232 lb (105 kg)	4.49 s	4.21 s	6.75 s	33 in (0.84 m)	9 ft 11 in (3.02 m)	19 reps
All values from Colorado Pro Day

=== Green Bay Packers ===
Jones was selected by the Packers in the seventh round of the 2009 NFL draft, and moved into a starting role during the 2009 season after a season-ending injury to linebacker/defensive end Aaron Kampman. Although taken in a lower round and not said to have many of the qualities expected for an NFL linebacker, Jones surprised many with a high degree of production, accruing four sacks and holding his own for the remainder of the season. His work ethic and moral standards were thought very highly of by the Packers' coaching staff.

Jones became the permanent starting outside linebacker when Aaron Kampman signed with the Jacksonville Jaguars during the 2010 offseason. He remained the starter on the right side until he suffered a shoulder injury in a game against the division rival Minnesota Vikings. He was placed on injured reserve three days later.

On January 1, 2012, during the regular season finale versus the Detroit Lions, Jones tackled a 15-year-old fan who had run onto the field.

Following the 2011-2012 season, the Packers moved Jones to inside linebacker, where he earned a roster spot as mainly a special teams player. Following season-ending injuries to Desmond Bishop and D.J. Smith, Jones started every game from week 6 on, including the playoffs, he went on to have his best season as a pro, recording 77 tackles, 2 sacks, 4 passes defensed and one forced fumble. After The 2012-2013, The Packers re-signed Jones to a 3 year $11.25 million dollar contract extension, and released Desmond Bishop, which put Jones and A. J. Hawk atop the depth-chart for the Packers at middle linebacker for the 2013-2014 season. On February 20, 2015, he was released by the Packers.

=== Philadelphia Eagles ===
On March 2, 2015, Jones signed a two-year contract with the Philadelphia Eagles. On November 11, 2015, Jones was cut from his contract with the Eagles.

=== NFL statistics ===
Season	Team	Games		Tackles				
Season	Team	GP	GS	Total	Solo	Ast	Sck	Int
2009	Green Bay Packers	14	7	33	26	7	4.0	0
2010	Green Bay Packers	6	5	27	16	11	0	0
2011	Green Bay Packers	15	1	19	12	7	1.0	0
2012	Green Bay Packers	16	10	77	56	21	2.0	0
2013	Green Bay Packers	12	12	84	60	24	3.0	0
2014	Green Bay Packers	13	1	18	12	6	0	0
2015	Philadelphia Eagles	7	0	5	4	1	0	0
	Total	83	36	263	186	76	10.0	0

== Personal life ==
Jones is a member of Omega Psi Phi fraternity.
