= Jarrett Boykin =

American gridiron football player (born 1989)

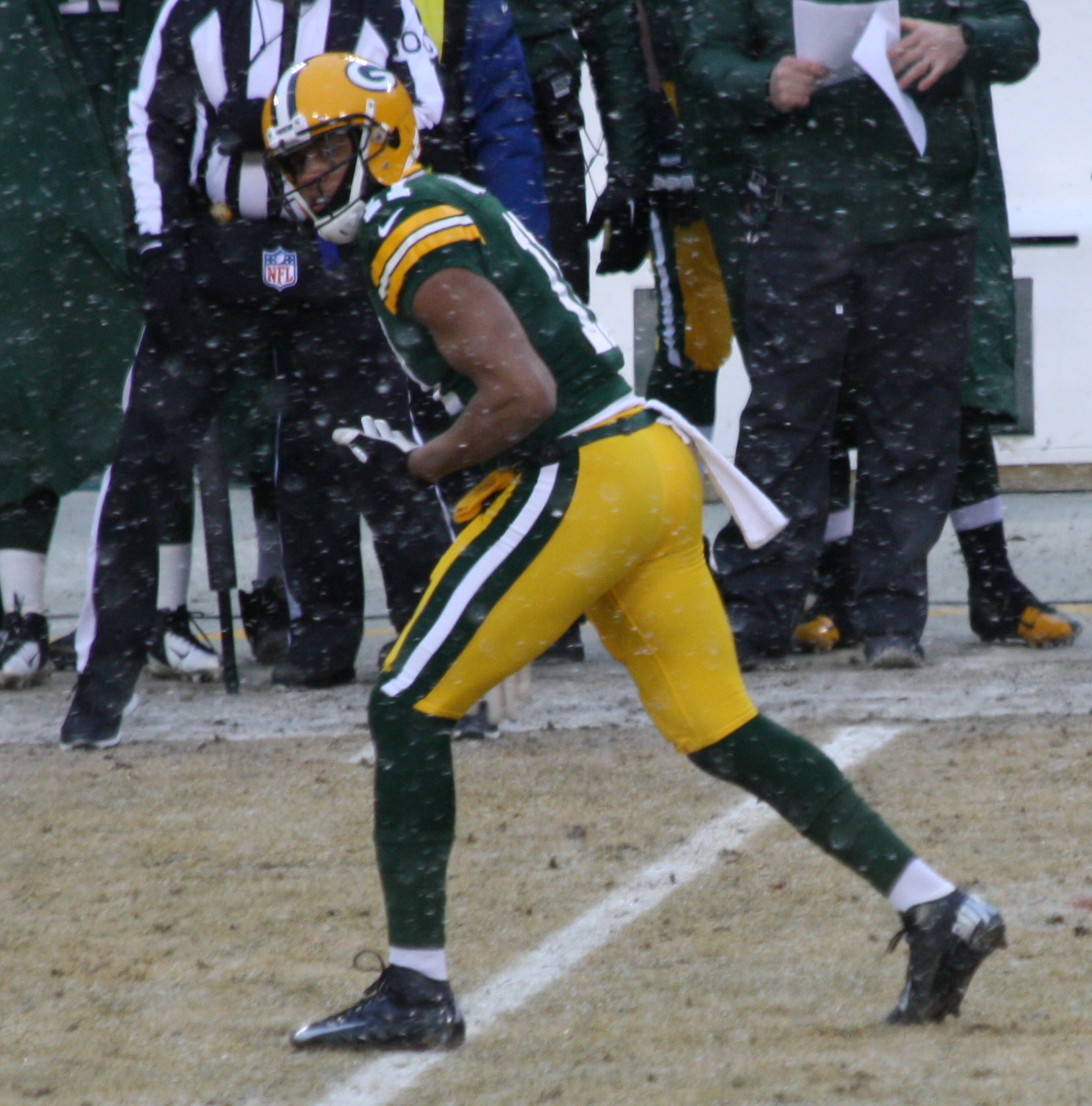
- Boykin with the Green Bay Packers in 2013

Lenoir–Rhyne Bears
- Title: Wide receivers coach

Personal information
- Born: November 4, 1989 (age 37); Chattanooga, Tennessee, U.S.
- Listed height: 6 ft 2 in (1.88 m)
- Listed weight: 216 lb (98 kg)

Career information
- High school: David W. Butler (Matthews, North Carolina)
- College: Virginia Tech (2008–2011)
- NFL draft: 2012: undrafted

Career history

Playing
- Jacksonville Jaguars (2012)*; Green Bay Packers (2012–2014); Carolina Panthers (2015)*; Buffalo Bills (2016)*; Calgary Stampeders (2016–2017)
- * Offseason or practice squad member only

Coaching
- Charlotte (2019) Quality control; Wingate (2020–2021) Wide receivers coach; Murray State (2022) Wide receivers coach; Texas A&M–Commerce (2023) Wide receivers coach; Lenoir–Rhyne (2024–present) Wide receivers coach

Career NFL statistics
- Receptions: 57
- Receiving yards: 731
- Receiving touchdowns: 3
- Stats at Pro Football Reference
- Stats at CFL.ca

Jarrett Boykin Jr. (born November 4, 1989) is an American football coach and former player who is the wide receivers coach for the Lenoir–Rhyne Bears. He played professionally as a wide receiver for the Green Bay Packers of the National Football League (NFL).

Boykin played college football for the Virginia Tech Hokies. He was signed by the Jacksonville Jaguars as an undrafted free agent in 2012. He was also a member of the Packers, Carolina Panthers, Buffalo Bills and Calgary Stampeders.

== Early life ==
Boykin was born in Chattanooga, Tennessee. His father died when he was an infant. He attended David W. Butler High School in Matthews, North Carolina. As a junior, he had 22 receptions in seven games for 476 yards and three touchdowns. Additionally, he served on special teams as both the kickoff and punt returner.

In his final year at Butler, Boykin had 60 receptions for 1,252 yards and 17 touchdowns. He also had 176 yards rushing and eight touchdowns, and continued his special teams roles. He was named an all-state selection by the Associated Press.

Boykin was ranked as a three-star prospect by both Rivals.com and Scout.com. He was well recruited coming out of high school, receiving scholarship offers from Virginia Tech, Appalachian State, Illinois, and South Carolina. His height was six foot two inches, and his weight was listed as 191 pounds (87 kg). He ran the 40-yard dash in 4.5 seconds and had a 3.25 GPA.

== College career ==
Boykin ultimately decided to play college football at Virginia Tech, where he made an immediate impact. During the freshman testing, he accomplished a 35-inch vertical jump. During his first spring practice, he caught a ball for 26 yards and blocked a punt. He caught the first touchdown pass of his college career against Duke University on a throw by Sean Glennon. It was the first touchdown of the season by a wide receiver. At the end of the year, Boykin lead the team with 441 receiving yards and was second on the team with 30 receptions.

Going into his sophomore year with the Hokies, Boykin had three receptions against the Alabama Crimson Tide for 19 yards. He had arguably his best game of the season against Duke when he had 144 yards on six catches. During the game against rival Virginia Cavaliers, Boykin did not have a reception but did recover a fumble in the endzone for a touchdown. He finished the season with 40 catches for 835 yards and an average of 20.9 yards per catch, with five receiving touchdowns.

Boykin started every game in his junior year and caught six passes for 102 and one touchdown in the season opener against Boise State. He caught a season-best eight receptions 177 yards against Central Michigan and had eight more against Wake Forest for 63 yards and a touchdown. He finished the season with 53 catches, 847 yards, and six touchdowns.

In the final season of his career as a Hokie, Boykin started off with two catches for 16 yards and a touchdown against Appalachian State. The next game, he became Virginia Tech's all-time record holder in receptions, with four catches against East Carolina University. He missed the game against Marshall due to injury, but returned to break the team record for receiving yards against Miami. He went on to have a career-high 10 catches for 106 yards against the North Carolina Tar Heels. He finished his last year starting all 13 games, becoming the career leader in receptions and receiving yards. He had 61 receptions and 761 yards on the season.

== Professional career ==
=== Pre-draft ===
Boykin was invited to the NFL Combine, but was projected to go undrafted. It was said he had good size to be in the NFL, good balance and body control, and outstanding leaping ability. However, he was also said to be slow off of blocks and had average suddenness to get out of coverage with inconsistent hands.

Pre-draft measurables
Height	Weight	40-yard dash	10-yard split	20-yard split	20-yard shuttle	Three-cone drill	Vertical jump	Broad jump	Bench press
6 ft 2 in (1.88 m)	217 lb (98 kg)	4.62 s	1.65 s	2.65 s	4.28 s	7.12 s	36 in (0.91 m)	10 ft 03 in (3.12 m)	11 reps
All values from NFL Combine.

=== Jacksonville Jaguars ===
Boykin was signed by the Jacksonville Jaguars as an undrafted rookie; but after spending a few days on the Jaguars' roster, he was cut in May 2012.

=== Green Bay Packers ===
Boykin made the Packers roster as an undrafted free agent in 2012. In 2012, Boykin signed a 3-year, $1.44 million contract.

On October 28, 2012, Boykin made his first NFL catch for 9 yards in a win over the Jacksonville Jaguars.

On October 20, 2013, Boykin received his first career start in the NFL, recording 8 receptions for 103 yards and a touchdown in a victory over the Cleveland Browns.

The 2013 season was Boykin's most productive year. Injuries to Randall Cobb and James Jones, as well as the departure of Greg Jennings in free agency allowed Boykin to play in all 16 games and start 8 of them. He finished the year with a career-high 49 receptions, 681 receiving yards, and 3 touchdowns.

In 2014, Boykin registered one catch in weeks 2 and 3 in games against the New York Jets and Detroit Lions. A groin injury sidelined him for weeks 4–6, keeping him out until he returned in week 7 against the Carolina Panthers. Boykin was not targeted during the game against the Panthers, nor the following two games against the Saints and the Bears. The next week against the Eagles, Boykin was targeted once before being taken off the field to be evaluated for a possible concussion.

Boykin finished the 2014 regular season playing in 13 of 16 games, mostly on special teams. He had 3 catches for 23 yards and was targeted 12 times. His longest catch was for 11 yards. During the final regular season game against the Lions, commentator Troy Aikman mentioned his surprise at Boykin's disappointing season after bursting onto the scene in 2013. In January 2015, the Milwaukee-Journal Sentinel wrote a story about Boykin and rookie Jeff Janis's reduced playing time. Boykin earned praise from offensive coordinator Tom Clements and from special teams coach Shawn Slocum. Boykin's biggest plays on special teams included a smothered punt attempt, forced fumble and recovery of an onside kick. However, they were also offset by three bad plays (out of position or late on two TD returns, poor decision on a pooch free kick). Despite that, special teams coach Shawn Slocum said, "Jarrett's on all four (core) teams. He's solid in coverage. He's been very dependable in his role."

On March 10, 2015, the Packers decided not to tender a right-of-first-refusal contract worth $1.542 million, releasing him and giving him the option to sign with any NFL team.

=== Carolina Panthers ===
Boykin signed a one-year contract with the Carolina Panthers on March 27, 2015. He was cut on September 1, 2015.

=== Buffalo Bills ===
On January 6, 2016, Boykin signed a reserve/future contract with the Buffalo Bills, reuniting him with his former Virginia Tech quarterback Tyrod Taylor. On September 2, 2016, he was released by the Bills as part of final roster cuts.

=== Calgary Stampeders ===
On November 10, 2016, Boykin was signed to the practice squad of the Calgary Stampeders of the Canadian Football League, the same day that Calgary signed Boykin's former Packer teammate Jarrett Bush. Boykin made the active roster for the 2017 season, but was placed on the 1-game injured list on June 22. He was given several extensions on the injured list, spending a total of four games out with injury before being cleared to play on July 21, when Boykin was placed back on Calgary's practice roster. After three games on the practice roster, Boykin was released on August 13 to make room for other players who were due to return from injury.

=== Flag football ===
In 2018, Boykin played as a member of the Roadrunners led by retired quarterback, Michael Vick, in the American Flag Football League.

=== Statistics ===
Season	Team	Games		Receiving				
Season	Team	GP	GS	Rec	Yds	Avg	Lng	TD
2012	Green Bay Packers	10	0	5	27	5.4	9	0
2013	Green Bay Packers	16	8	49	681	13.9	52	3
2014	Green Bay Packers	13	3	3	23	7.7	11	0
	Total	39	11	57	731	12.8	52	3

== Coaching career ==
Following Boykins playing days, he moved in to his coaching career. He first joined the Oakland Raiders as part of the Bill Walsh Diversity Coaching Fellowship program, before later joined the Charlotte 49ers staff as an offensive quality control coach in 2019. The following year, Boykin joined Joe Reich's staff at Wingate as the wide receivers coach.

After two seasons at Wingate, Boykin joined the staff at Murray State as the wide receivers coach, opting for the on-field coaching position over offers to join Power Five programs as an analyst.

In 2023, Boykin served as the wide receivers coach for Texas A&M–Commerce. After one season he was hired for the same role under first-year head coach Doug Socha for Lenoir–Rhyne.
