= B. J. Coleman =

American gridiron football player (born 1988)

No. 16
- Position: Quarterback

Personal information
- Born: September 16, 1988 (age 38); Chattanooga, Tennessee, U.S.
- Listed height: 6 ft 3 in (1.91 m)
- Listed weight: 225 lb (102 kg)

Career information
- High school: The McCallie School (Chattanooga)
- College: Tennessee (2007–2008); Chattanooga (2009–2011)
- NFL draft: 2012: 7th round, 243rd overall pick

Career history
- Green Bay Packers (2012)*; Arizona Rattlers (2015); Saskatchewan Roughriders (2016)
- * Offseason or practice squad member only

Awards and highlights
- Second-team All-Southern Conference (2010)

Career AFL statistics
- Comp. / Att.: 61 / 119
- Passing yards: 629
- TD–INT: 17–6
- QB rating: 81.53
- Rushing yards: 6
- Stats at ArenaFan.com
- Stats at Pro Football Reference
- Stats at CFL.ca

Bryon Elwyn "B. J." Coleman Jr. (born September 16, 1988) is an American former professional football quarterback. He played college football for the Chattanooga Mocs after transferring there from Tennessee. He was selected by the Green Bay Packers in the seventh round of the 2012 NFL draft.

== Early life ==
Bryon Elwyn Coleman Jr. was born on September 16, 1988. He played high school football at The McCallie School in Chattanooga. He passed for 1,993 yards and 15 touchdowns his sophomore year in 2004 and 2,203 yards and 19 touchdowns as a junior in 2005. As a senior in 2006, he completed 166 of 257 passes for 2,927 yards and 19 touchdowns while also rushing for 241 yards and seven touchdowns. Coleman earned Division II AAA first-team All-State honors his senior year. He set school single-season and career records in both passing yards and passing touchdowns. In the class of 2007, he was rated the No. 10 pro-style quarterback by Rivals.com, the No. 16 overall quarterback by Scout.com, and the No. 90 overall quarterback by ESPN.com. Coleman was also a three-year starter on the baseball team in high school, playing both pitcher and outfield.

== College career ==
Coleman first played college football for the Tennessee Volunteers of the University of Tennessee. He was redshirted in 2007. He played in three games in 2008, completing four of eight passes for 21 yards and one interception.

Coleman then transferred to play for the Chattanooga Mocs of the University of Tennessee at Chattanooga. He started all 11 games for the Mocs in 2009, recording 227 completions on 401 attempts (56.6%) for 2,348 yards, 17 touchdowns, and nine interceptions. He started all 11 games for the second straight season in 2010, completing 215 of 382 passes (56.3%) for 2,996 yards, 26 touchdowns, and 13 interceptions, earning second-team All-Southern Conference honors. Coleman played in seven games, all starts, as a senior in 2011, completing 137 of 225 passes (60.9%) for 1,527 yards, nine touchdowns, and nine interceptions. He missed part of the 2011 season due to a shoulder injury on his throwing arm. His 6,871 career passing yards were the second most in school history. Coleman was invited to the East–West Shrine Game after his senior year. He graduated with a communications degree in December 2011.

== Professional career ==
Pre-draft measurables
Height	Weight	Arm length	Hand span	Wingspan	40-yard dash	10-yard split	20-yard split	20-yard shuttle	Three-cone drill	Vertical jump	Broad jump
6 ft 3 in (1.91 m)	233 lb (106 kg)	31 5/8 in (0.80 m)	10 3/8 in (0.26 m)	6 ft 4 3/8 in (1.94 m)	4.94 s	1.72 s	2.88 s	4.38 s	7.07 s	29.5 in (0.75 m)	9 ft 1 in (2.77 m)
All values from NFL Combine/Pro Day

Coleman was rated the ninth best quarterback in the 2012 NFL draft by NFLDraftScout.com.

Coleman was selected by the Green Bay Packers in the seventh round, with the 243rd overall pick, of the 2012 draft. He officially signed with the team on May 10. He was released on August 31 and signed to the practice squad on September 2, 2012. Coleman became a free agent after the 2012 season and re-signed with the Packers on January 14, 2013. He was later released on September 2, 2013. Coleman was the last quarterback released by the Packers before the start of the season, having beaten out Vince Young and Graham Harrell. This left Aaron Rodgers and practice squad signee Scott Tolzien as the only quarterbacks on the roster, so the team then signed Seneca Wallace to be Rodgers' backup.

On January 19, 2015, Coleman was assigned to the Arizona Rattlers of the Arena Football League (AFL). He began the 2015 AFL season as the backup to Nick Davila but took over as starter after Davila suffered an injury. On May 28, 2015, before Davila had returned from injury, it was announced that Coleman abruptly resigned from the team for a job outside of football. Overall, Coleman completed 61 of 119 passes (51.3%) for 629 yards, 17 touchdowns, and six interceptions in 2015. He was placed on "League Suspension" by the Rattlers on May 28, 2015. He was placed on reassignment on November 5, 2015.

On January 25, 2016, Coleman signed with the Saskatchewan Roughriders of the Canadian Football League (CFL). He dressed in one game for the Roughriders during the 2016 CFL season before being released on August 9, 2016.

== Personal life ==
Coleman's father, Bryon, played college football at Chattanooga from 1977 to 1980. B. J.'s brother, Jarrod, was a tight end at Chattanooga.

Coleman became the CEO of a behavioral health company after his football career.
