= Andrew Datko =

American football player (born 1990)

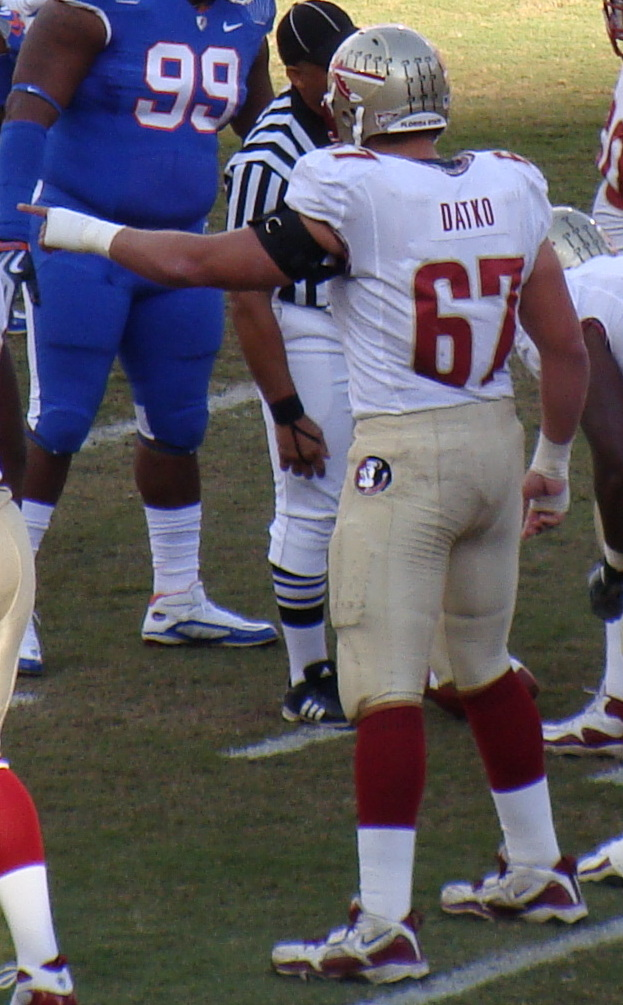
- Datko with Florida State in 2009

No. 77
- Position: Offensive tackle

Personal information
- Born: August 15, 1990 (age 36); Miami, Florida, U.S.
- Listed height: 6 ft 6 in (1.98 m)
- Listed weight: 315 lb (143 kg)

Career information
- High school: St. Thomas Aquinas (Fort Lauderdale, Florida)
- College: Florida State
- NFL draft: 2012: 7th round, 241st overall pick

Career history
- Green Bay Packers (2012)*
- * Offseason or practice squad member only
- Stats at Pro Football Reference

Andrew John Datko (born August 15, 1990) is an American former football offensive tackle. He played college football at Florida State. Datko was selected by the Green Bay Packers in the seventh round of the 2012 NFL draft.

== Early life ==
Datko attended St. Thomas Aquinas High School in Fort Lauderdale, Florida, where he played for the state title every year of his high school career. As a senior, he was part of St. Thomas' 14-1 5A State Championship squad.

Considered a three-star recruit by Rivals.com, Datko ranked No. 35 among offensive guard prospects in the nation. He chose Florida State over Central Florida and Florida International on October 29, 2007.

== College career ==
As a true freshman, Datko started all but one game at left tackle for the Seminoles. He played 852 snaps, more than any freshman on the line, and recorded 21 knockdowns.

Datko subsequently earned multiple All-Freshman honors, as he was named to FWAA′s Freshman All-America team, Sporting News′ Freshman All-American team, and Rivals.com′s Freshman All-America team. He is the first Florida State tackle to garner freshman All-America honors since Brett Williams in 1999.

== Professional career ==
Datko was selected in the seventh round (241st overall) by the Green Bay Packers in the 2012 NFL draft. On May 11, 2012, he signed a contract with the Packers. Datko was released by the Packers on August 31, 2012. On September 3, 2012, he was signed to the Packers' practice squad. Datko was re-signed by the Packers after the season ended on January 14, 2013.

On August 31, 2013, he was released by the Packers during final team cuts.
