= Greg Van Roten =

American football player (born 1990)

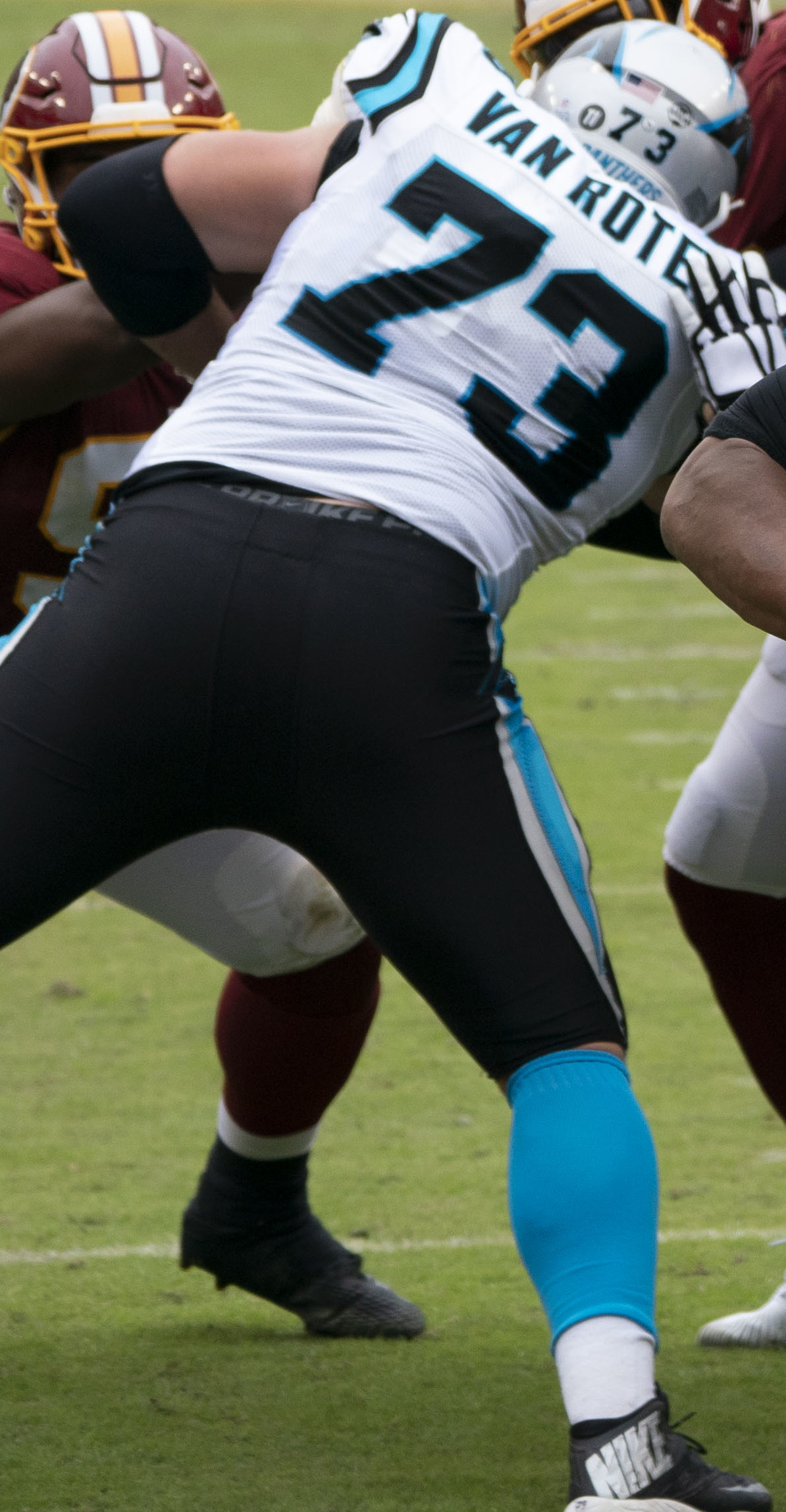
- Van Roten with the Carolina Panthers in 2018

No. 70 – New England Patriots
- Position: Guard
- Roster status: Active

Personal information
- Born: February 26, 1990 (age 36); Rockville Centre, New York, U.S.
- Listed height: 6 ft 3 in (1.91 m)
- Listed weight: 305 lb (138 kg)

Career information
- High school: Chaminade (Mineola, New York)
- College: Penn (2008–2011)
- NFL draft: 2012: undrafted

Career history
- Green Bay Packers (2012–2013); Seattle Seahawks (2014)*; Toronto Argonauts (2015–2016); Jacksonville Jaguars (2017)*; Carolina Panthers (2017–2019); New York Jets (2020–2021); Buffalo Bills (2022); Las Vegas Raiders (2023); New York Giants (2024–2025); New England Patriots (2026–present)
- * Offseason or practice squad member only

Awards and highlights
- Unanimous first-team All-Ivy (2011); First-team All-Ivy (2010)

Career NFL statistics as of Week 10, 2026
- Games played: 148
- Games started: 107
- Fumble recoveries: 4
- Stats at Pro Football Reference
- Stats at CFL.ca (archive)

Gregory Van Roten (born February 26, 1990) is an American professional football guard for the New England Patriots of the National Football League (NFL). He was originally signed by the Green Bay Packers as an undrafted free agent in 2012. He played college football for the Penn Quakers.

== Early life ==
Van Roten's football career started with the Baldwin Bombers youth football organization at the age of 11. He attended, and was an All-State Left Tackle at Chaminade High School in Mineola, New York from 2005 to 2008.

== College career ==
Van Roten was an Ivy League All-Conference tackle for Penn from 2008 to 2012. While at the University of Pennsylvania, he studied at the Wharton School of Business and received his Bachelor of Science in Economics with a Concentration in Marketing. While at Penn, Van Roten was a member of the Delta Tau Delta fraternity and the Student Athlete Advisory Committee.

== Professional career ==
Pre-draft measurables
Height	Weight	40-yard dash	10-yard split	20-yard split	20-yard shuttle	Three-cone drill	Vertical jump	Broad jump	Bench press
6 ft 3 in (1.91 m)	303 lb (137 kg)	5.12 s	1.79 s	2.92 s	4.60 s	7.98 s	34.5 in (0.88 m)	9 ft 4 in (2.84 m)	31 reps
All values from Pro Day

=== Green Bay Packers ===
Van Roten was signed by the Green Bay Packers on July 25, 2012. He played in ten games for the Packers from 2012 to 2013. He was released by the Packers on February 11, 2014.

=== Seattle Seahawks ===
He signed with the Seattle Seahawks on February 14, 2014, and was released by the team on August 27, 2014.

=== Toronto Argonauts ===
On May 22, 2015, Van Roten signed with the Toronto Argonauts of the Canadian Football League.

=== Jacksonville Jaguars ===
On February 27, 2017, Van Roten signed with the Jacksonville Jaguars. On May 1, 2017, he was released by the Jaguars.

=== Carolina Panthers ===
On July 25, 2017, Van Roten signed with the Carolina Panthers. He played in 10 games his first season in Carolina, primary on special teams, and served as a backup center and guard.

On January 29, 2018, Van Roten signed a two-year contract extension with the Panthers. He became a full-time starter in 2018, starting all 16 games at left guard. He was the only Panthers player to play every single offensive snap.

In 2019, Van Roten started the first 11 games at left guard before suffering a dislocated toe in Week 12. He was placed on injured reserve on November 27, 2019.

=== New York Jets ===
On April 2, 2020, Van Roten signed a three-year contract with the New York Jets. He started the first 12 games at right guard before being placed on injured reserve on December 12, 2020. On January 2, 2021, Van Roten was activated off of injured reserve.

On May 6, 2022, Van Roten was released by the Jets.

=== Buffalo Bills ===
On June 13, 2022, the Buffalo Bills signed Van Roten to a one-year deal. In the 2022 season, he appeared in 16 games and started four.

=== Las Vegas Raiders ===
On May 19, 2023, Van Roten signed with the Las Vegas Raiders. He was named the starting right guard, and started all 17 games.

=== New York Giants ===
On July 31, 2024, Van Roten signed a one-year, $3 million contract with the New York Giants. This reunited him with former Raiders teammate Jermaine Eluemunor and offensive line coach Carmen Bricillo. He was named the Giants starting right guard in 2024, starting all 17 games there and at center, playing every snap.

On March 19, 2025, Van Roten re-signed with the Giants on a one-year contract.

=== New England Patriots ===
On August 18, 2026, Van Roten signed with the New England Patriots.
