= Cowboys–Packers rivalry =

National Football League rivalry

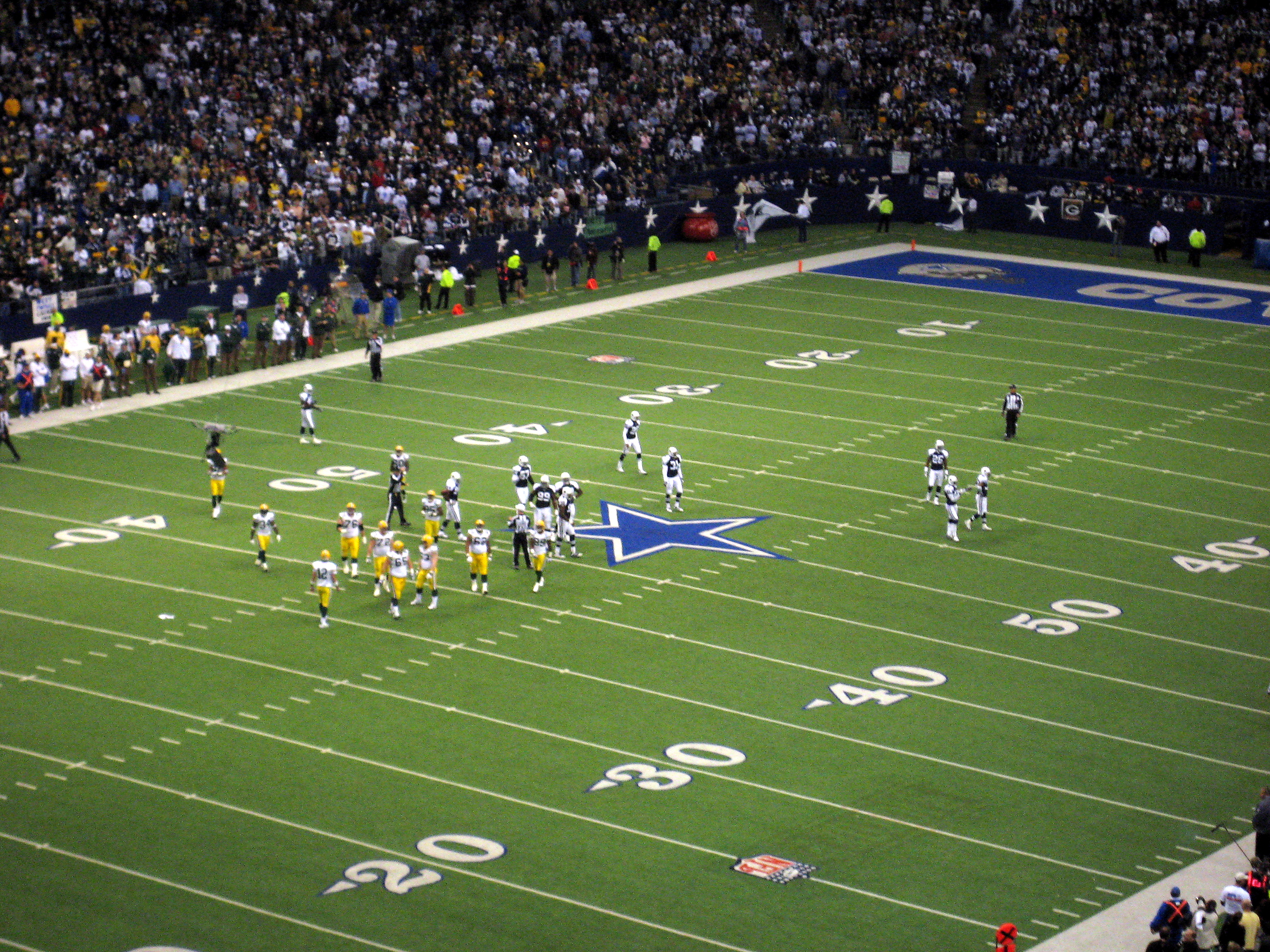
- The Cowboys and Packers playing in 2007

- Dallas Cowboys Green Bay Packers
- Location: Dallas, Green Bay
- First meeting: November 13, 1960; Packers 41, Cowboys 7
- Latest meeting: October 18, 2026; Packers 23, Cowboys 13
- Next meeting: TBD
- Stadiums: Cowboys: AT&T Stadium; Packers: Lambeau Field

Statistics
- Total meetings: 41
- All-time series: Packers: 23–17–1
- Regular season series: Packers: 18–13–1
- Postseason results: Packers: 5–4
- Largest victory: Cowboys: 42–14 (1978); Packers: 45–7 (2010)
- Most points scored: Cowboys: 42 (1978), (1994); Packers: 48 (2023)
- Longest win streak: Cowboys: 8 (1991–1996); Packers: 6 (1960–1968)
- Current win streak: Packers: 1 (2026–present)

Post-season history
- 1966 NFL Championship Game: Packers won: 34–27; 1967 NFL Championship Game: Packers won: 21–17; 1982 NFC Divisional: Cowboys won: 37–26; 1993 NFC Divisional: Cowboys won: 27–17; 1994 NFC Divisional: Cowboys won: 35–9; 1995 NFC Championship: Cowboys won: 38–27; 2014 NFC Divisional: Packers won: 26–21; 2016 NFC Divisional: Packers won: 34–31; 2023 NFC Wild Card: Packers won: 48–32

The Cowboys–Packers rivalry is a professional American football rivalry in the National Football League (NFL) between the Dallas Cowboys and the Green Bay Packers. The two teams do not play each other every year; instead, they play at least once every three years and at least once every six seasons at each team's home stadium during which the NFC East and NFC North are paired up against one another. In addition, not only could the two teams meet in the playoffs in a given season, but also if the two teams finish in the same place in their respective divisions in any season, they will play each other the following season. The rivalry has also resulted in several notable games, including nine playoff games. CBS ranked this rivalry as the No. 3 NFL rivalry of the 1990s.

The Packers lead the overall series 23–17–1. The two teams have met nine times in the playoffs, with the Packers holding a 5–4 advantage.

== History ==
Although the rivalry has existed throughout the history of each team, it was most notable during two time periods. The first period occurred during late 1960s as both teams were highly successful prior to the AFL-NFL merger, which culminated in meeting in consecutive NFL Championship Games in 1966 and 1967. The 1967 meeting has been labelled the "Ice Bowl", with the temperature at kick-off at -13 °F (-25 °C). The Packers won the game on a late quarterback sneak by Bart Starr, which sent them to the Super Bowl. Each game ended in dramatic fashion in favor of the Packers, which led to them winning the first two Super Bowls (Super Bowl I and II). The Cowboys never defeated the Packers in the time Vince Lombardi was Packers head coach.

The second period of notability occurred throughout the 1990s as both the Packers and Cowboys, alongside the San Francisco 49ers, were amongst the strongest teams in the NFC. The Packers and Cowboys met in the postseason three straight years from 1993 to 1995, with Dallas winning in each encounter, all of which were in Dallas. The Cowboys won two of their three Super Bowls in this period after defeating Green Bay in the postseason and won nine of ten meetings in the 90s. From 1992 to 1997, the Cowboys and Packers combined for five Super Bowl appearances and four Super Bowl championships. Additionally, the Packers won Super Bowl XLV in AT&T Stadium in 2011. Even during periods where one or both teams were not successful, the match-up was still considered a "storied championship rivalry".

During the Brett Favre era in Green Bay, the Cowboys dominated the rivalry, going 9–2, with a 9–0 at home in Dallas against the Packers when Favre was the quarterback. However, the Aaron Rodgers era saw the Packers dominate the rivalry, as Rodgers compiled an 8–2 record against the Cowboys during his time as Packers starter, including a perfect 3–0 record in Dallas. This notably included the infamous Dez Caught It game in Green Bay in the 2014 playoffs. Late in the game, quarterback Tony Romo completed what was initially called a catch on 4th down to wide receiver Dez Bryant near the goal line. After review though, the referees, led by Gene Steratore, who previously overturned Calvin Johnson's catch, overturned Dez's catch, saying that Bryant "did not complete the act of making the catch" after he bobbled the ball as he hit the ground. The Packers gained possession on the turnover on downs and ended up winning the game. This subsequently prompted the rule change three years later, that allows the receiver's ability to make a football move when the receiver gets control of the ball and gets two feet or another body part on the ground inbounds. The NFL was hopeful of the new rule, saying "It will eradicate some of the frustration fans, coaches and players had with apparent catches -- like Cowboys receiver Dez Bryant's against Green Bay in the 2014 playoffs, or Steelers tight end Jesse James' reversed TD against the Patriots this past season – being deemed incomplete."

Two seasons after the controversial 2014 NFC Divisional Game, the 4-seeded Packers again faced off against the top-seeded Cowboys in a 2016 NFC Divisional Game, which was played in Dallas. The Packers, who lost soundly to the Cowboys earlier that season in Green Bay, raced out to a 21-3 lead in the first half. However, Dallas, behind the efforts of Bryant and rookie quarterback Dak Prescott, fought back to tie the game at 28 in the 4th quarter. After the teams traded field goals, Green Bay had a chance to drive into field goal range and win the game at the end of regulation. However, the Packers faced a 3rd and 20 at their own 32-yard line with 12 seconds left in regulation and just one timeout at their disposal. Although their chances of getting into field goal range were highly improbable, Rodgers threw a laser to tight end Jared Cook, who caught the ball along the Dallas sideline and barely managed to drag both feet in bounds while possessing the ball for an incredible 36-yard completion that got Green Bay into field goal range with time remaining. Kicker Mason Crosby then converted the ensuing 51-yard field goal attempt as time expired to send the Cowboys home and the Packers to the NFC Championship Game. With this defeat, Green Bay remained undefeated at Dallas’ AT&T Stadium, while Dallas failed to participate in a conference championship game for the 21st consecutive season.

The two teams played their first overtime game in the series on November 13, 2022. The 3–6 Packers, riding a five-game losing streak, entered the game as 3.5-point underdogs to the 6–2 Cowboys, led by former Packers head coach Mike McCarthy in his return to Lambeau Field since getting fired by the Packers in 2018. After a scoreless first quarter, the two teams entered halftime tied at 14 after each team scored two touchdowns. The Cowboys would score two more touchdowns in the third quarter to take a 28–14 lead heading into the fourth quarter. The Cowboys had never lost a game in franchise history when leading by 14 or more points in the fourth quarter, but two touchdown passes from Aaron Rodgers to rookie wide receiver Christian Watson allowed the Packers to tie the game and send it to overtime. After getting the ball first to start overtime, the Cowboys marched down to the Packers' 35-yard line and faced a fourth down and three, but couldn’t convert and turned the ball over on downs. On the Packers' ensuing drive, Rodgers completed a 36-yard pass to wide receiver Allen Lazard on third down to set up Mason Crosby's game-winning field goal. This would be the final start in the series for Rodgers, who was traded to the New York Jets the following offseason.

The two rivals most recently met in the wild-card round of the 2023–24 NFL playoffs at AT&T Stadium on January 14, 2024. In an upset, 7th-seeded Green Bay, led by first-year starter Jordan Love, defeated 2nd-seeded and McCarthy-led Dallas by a final score of 48–32. At one point, the Packers led their rival by 32 points in the fourth quarter. This was the first time a 7th-seeded team won a playoff game since the NFL expanded the playoffs to 14 teams in 2020, and also extended Green Bay's record at AT&T Stadium to 5–0.

Not only did the win prevent the Cowboys from potentially having a third straight matchup with the teams' fellow rival, the San Francisco 49ers, but it also set up a record 10th playoff meeting between the Packers and 49ers.

In 2025, the Cowboys traded defensive end Micah Parsons to the Packers in exchange for two first-round picks and defensive tackle Kenny Clark.

As of the 2025 season, Green Bay is one of two NFC teams (along with the San Francisco 49ers) with a winning record against the Cowboys, and one of only six teams in the NFL with a winning record against the Cowboys. (Note: The other four teams that have a winning record against the Cowboys are the Baltimore Ravens, the Cleveland Browns, the Denver Broncos, and the Las Vegas Raiders.) Moreover, the Packers have the same amount of postseason wins in AT&T Stadium as the Cowboys (Packers won 3 including Super Bowl XLV, Cowboys have also won 3).

The two teams have met nine times in the postseason, with Green Bay leading the series 5–4.

== Season-by-season results ==
Dallas Cowboys vs. Green Bay Packers Season-by-Season Results
1960s (Packers, 6–0)

Season	Results	Location	Overall series	Notes
1960	Packers; 41–7	Lambeau Field	Packers; 1–0	Cowboys join the National Football League (NFL) as an expansion team. Packers lose 1960 NFL Championship.
1964	Packers; 45–21	Cotton Bowl	Packers; 2–0	
1965	Packers; 13–3	Milwaukee County Stadium	Packers; 3–0	Packers win 1965 NFL Championship.
1966 playoffs	Packers 34–27	Cotton Bowl	Packers 4–0	NFL Championship Game. Packers win Super Bowl I.
1967 playoffs	Packers 21–17	Lambeau Field	Packers 5–0	NFL Championship Game, also known eponymously as the "Ice Bowl". Packers win Super Bowl II.
1968	Packers; 28–17	Cotton Bowl	Packers; 6–0	Monday night game televised nationally by CBS. Packers' win handed the Cowboys their first loss of the season after a 6–0 start.

1970s (Tied, 2–2)

Season	Results	Location	Overall series	Notes
1970	Cowboys; 16–3	Cotton Bowl	Packers; 6–1	Game was played on Thanksgiving. Cowboys record their first victory against the Packers and their first on artificial turf. Last meeting at the Cotton Bowl. Cowboys won NFC title, but lost Super Bowl V.
1972	Packers; 16–13	Milwaukee County Stadium	Packers; 7–1	
1975	Packers; 19–17	Texas Stadium	Packers; 8–1	First meeting at Texas Stadium. Packers' only win vs the Cowboys under coach Bart Starr. Cowboys lose Super Bowl X.
1978	Cowboys; 42–14	Milwaukee County Stadium	Packers; 8–2	Cowboys record their largest victory against the Packers with a 28–point differential and score their most points in a game against the Packers. Cowboys lose Super Bowl XIII.

1980s (Cowboys, 3–2)

Season	Results	Location	Overall series	Notes
1980	Cowboys; 28–7	Milwaukee County Stadium	Packers; 8–3	
1982 playoffs	Cowboys 37–26	Texas Stadium	Packers 8–4	NFC Second Round playoffs.
1984	Cowboys; 20–6	Texas Stadium	Packers; 8–5	
1989	Packers; 31–13	Lambeau Field	Packers; 10–5	First meeting at Lambeau Field since the Ice Bowl.
1989	Packers; 20–10	Texas Stadium	Packers; 10–5	Cowboys QB Troy Aikman makes first start against the Packers. Marked the only time both teams have met in the regular season twice.

1990s (Cowboys, 9–1)

Season	Results	Location	Overall series	Notes
1991	Cowboys; 20–17	Milwaukee County Stadium	Packers; 10–6	Last meeting at Milwaukee County Stadium.
1993	Cowboys; 36–14	Texas Stadium	Packers; 10–7	Packers QB Brett Favre's first start against the Cowboys.
1993 playoffs	Cowboys 27–17	Texas Stadium	Packers 10–8	NFC Divisional Playoff. Cowboys go on to win Super Bowl XXVIII.
1994	Cowboys; 42–31	Texas Stadium	Packers; 10–9	Game was played on Thanksgiving. Jason Garrett starts for injured Troy Aikman.
1994 playoffs	Cowboys 35–9	Texas Stadium	Tie 10–10	NFC Divisional Playoff. Cowboys lose NFC Championship game.
1995	Cowboys; 34–24	Texas Stadium	Cowboys; 11–10	
1995 playoffs	Cowboys 38–27	Texas Stadium	Cowboys 12–10	NFC Championship Game. Cowboys last NFC Championship Game appearance to date. Cowboys win Super Bowl XXX.
1996	Cowboys; 21–6	Texas Stadium	Cowboys; 13–10	Monday Night Football. Cowboys' K Chris Boniol sets team and then-NFL record with seven field goals. Cowboys win 8 straight meetings. Packers win Super Bowl XXXI.
1997	Packers; 45–17	Lambeau Field	Cowboys; 13–11	Last start for Troy Aikman in the series. Packers lose Super Bowl XXXII.
1999	Cowboys; 27–13	Texas Stadium	Cowboys; 14–11	Jason Garrett starts for Troy Aikman.

2000s (Tied, 2–2)

Season	Results	Location	Overall series	Notes
2004	Packers; 41–20	Lambeau Field	Cowboys; 14–12	
2007	Cowboys; 37–27	Texas Stadium	Cowboys; 15–12	Thursday Night Football. Aaron Rodgers takes over Brett Favre. Last meeting in Texas Stadium.
2008	Cowboys; 27–16	Lambeau Field	Cowboys; 16–12	Sunday Night Football. Packers' QB Aaron Rodgers' first start in the rivalry, and the Cowboys' first ever win at Lambeau Field.
2009	Packers; 17–7	Lambeau Field	Cowboys; 16–13	

2010s (Packers, 7–1)

Season	Results	Location	Overall series	Notes
2010	Packers; 45–7	Lambeau Field	Cowboys; 16–14	Sunday Night Football. Packers record their largest victory against the Cowboys with a 38–point differential. Packers win Super Bowl XLV.
2013	Packers; 37–36	AT&T Stadium	Cowboys; 16–15	First meeting at AT&T Stadium. Packers overcame a 26–3 halftime deficit behind 5 consecutive touchdown drives by backup QB Matt Flynn. The 23-point comeback tied a Packers franchise record for their largest ever. Cowboys' first home loss to the Packers since the 1989 season. Last season Cowboys held the overall series lead.
2014 playoffs	Packers 26–21	Lambeau Field	Tie 16–16	NFC Divisional playoffs, known as the "Dez Caught It" game. Cowboys' Wide receiver Dez Bryant controversially had a 31-yard catch on fourth-and-2 overturned by referees, leading the Packers to a 26–21 win. Cowboys' only road loss in their 2014 season.
2015	Packers; 28–7	Lambeau Field	Packers; 17–16	First lead in the series for the Packers since 1994.
2016	Cowboys; 30–16	Lambeau Field	Tie; 17–17	Cowboys QB Dak Prescott's first start in the rivalry.
2016 playoffs	Packers 34–31	AT&T Stadium	Packers 18–17	NFC Divisional playoffs. Packers win on game-winning 51-yard field goal by Mason Crosby as time expires after Jared Cook caught a 36-yard pass from Aaron Rodgers on third-and-20 from the Green Bay 32-yard line.
2017	Packers; 35–31	AT&T Stadium	Packers; 19–17	Packers overcame 21–6 deficit as Aaron Rodgers threw the game-winning touchdown pass to WR Davante Adams with 11 seconds remaining.
2019	Packers; 34–24	AT&T Stadium	Packers; 20–17	RB Aaron Jones ties a Packers franchise record with 4 rushing touchdowns.

2020s (Packers, 3–0–1)

Season	Results	Location	Overall series	Notes
2022	Packers; 31–28 (OT)	Lambeau Field	Packers; 21–17	Cowboys hire former Packers' HC Mike McCarthy in the 2020 season, who makes his return to Green Bay this game. Packers overcame a 28–14 fourth-quarter deficit. First game in the series to go to overtime. Aaron Rodgers' final start in the rivalry.
2023 playoffs	Packers 48–32	AT&T Stadium	Packers 22–17	NFC Wild Card. Packers score their most points in a game against the Cowboys and become the first 7-seed to win a playoff game. Packers quarterback Jordan Love's first start against Dallas and first postseason start. Packers' win snapped the Cowboys' 16-game home winning streak.
2025	Tie; 40–40 (OT)	AT&T Stadium	Packers; 22–17–1	Cowboys trade Defensive end Micah Parsons to the Packers for Defensive Tackle Kenny Clark; First tie result for the Cowboys and Packers since the 1969 and 2018 seasons respectively. First tie in the series.
2026	Packers; 23–13	Lambeau Field	Packers; 23–17–1	

Summary of results

Season	Season series	at Dallas Cowboys	at Green Bay Packers	Notes
Regular season	Packers 18–13–1	Cowboys 8–7–1	Packers 11–5	
Postseason	Packers 5–4	Cowboys 4–3	Packers 2–0	NFL Championship Game: 1966, 1967; NFC Wild Card: 2023; NFC Divisional: 1982, 1993, 1994, 2014, 2016; NFC Championship: 1995
Regular and postseason	Packers 23–17–1	Cowboys 12–10–1	Packers 13–5	Cowboys have a 3–2 record in Milwaukee. Packers currently have a 11–2 record in Green Bay.

== See also ==
- List of NFL rivalries
