= Dez Caught It =

2015 National Football League game

Dallas Cowboys (3) (12–4)	Green Bay Packers (2) (12–4)
21	26
Head coach: Jason Garrett	Head coach: Mike McCarthy
	1	2	3	4	Total
DAL	7	7	7	0	21
GB	7	3	10	6	26
- Date: January 11, 2015
- Stadium: Lambeau Field; Green Bay, Wisconsin, U.S.
- Favorite: Packers by 6
- Referee: Gene Steratore
- Attendance: 79,704

TV in the United States
- Network: Fox
- Announcers: Joe Buck, Troy Aikman, Erin Andrews and Chris Myers

Dez Caught It (also known as the No-Catch Game) was a National Football League (NFL) Divisional Playoff game between the Dallas Cowboys and the Green Bay Packers on January 11, 2015. The game, which was played at Lambeau Field in Green Bay, Wisconsin, gained notoriety after a play in which Cowboys wide receiver Dez Bryant attempted to catch a pass from quarterback Tony Romo in the closing minutes of the fourth quarter. The pass was initially ruled a catch before controversially being overturned after officials determined Bryant did not complete the process of a catch while he was lunging towards the end zone.

The Packers would get the ball on the turnover on downs and run out the rest of the game clock. They won by a score of 26–21 and moved on to the NFC Championship Game, where they would lose to the Seattle Seahawks. In the following years, the NFL changed the rules regarding catching a pass while falling to the ground. Some of the new rules would likely have given Bryant a completed catch, although what constitutes a catch has continued to be debated.

== Background ==
The Dallas Cowboys went 12–4 during the 2014 NFL season and entered as the third seed after clinching the NFC East, making them the 10th non-repeat division champions since the 2004 season. Dallas won 5 out of their last 6 games after their bye week, which clinched the division and advanced them to the NFC Wild Card game, where they defeated the Detroit Lions to further advance to the NFC Divisional Playoff round. That game was not without its own controversy because of a pass interference flag that was called on Cowboys linebacker Anthony Hitchens when he seemingly interfered with Lions tight end Brandon Pettigrew. The initial flag was picked up and the penalty waived off, causing the controversy. The Cowboys won that game 24–20 to face the Packers in the divisional round.

The Green Bay Packers also went 12–4 and entered the playoffs as the second seed and a first-round bye after clinching the NFC North division. This was the fourth year in a row the Packers won the NFC North. Green Bay, like Dallas, only lost one game after their own bye week, winning seven out of eight. The Packers made the playoffs for the sixth straight season, tying the record set between 1993 and 1998. This game would be the two teams' first meeting in the playoffs in 19 years, since the 1995 NFC Championship Game, and the first playoff game in the rivalry played at Lambeau Field in 47 years, with the last being the legendary Ice Bowl. The Packers were favored by six points.

== Game summary ==
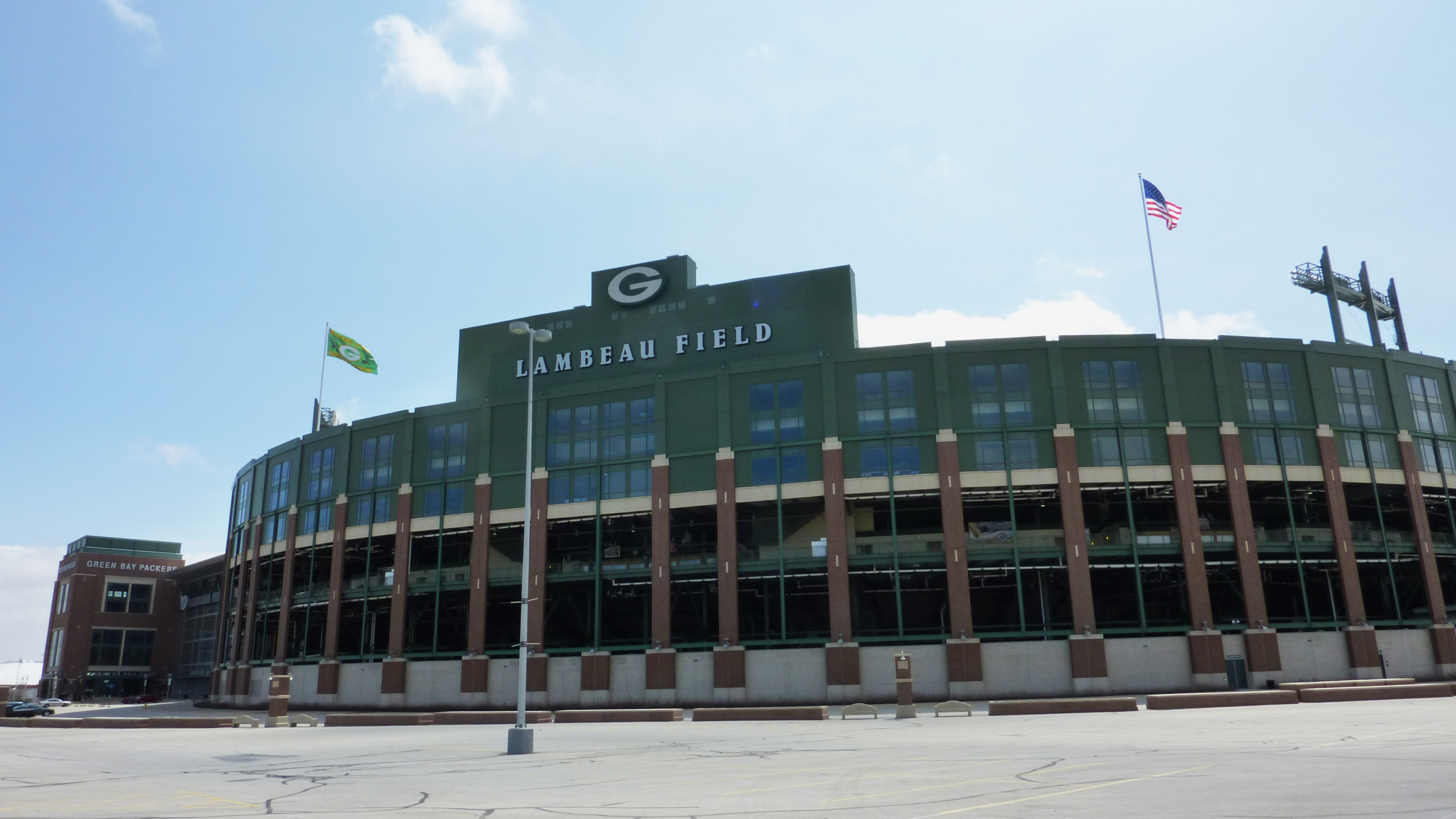
Lambeau Field (c. 2011), the site of the game.

=== First half ===
The Cowboys received the ball to begin the game but quickly went three-and-out. After the Cowboys punted the ball, the Packers began a 10-play, 60-yard drive, with a 4-yard touchdown pass from Packers quarterback Aaron Rodgers to tight end Andrew Quarless bringing the score to 7–0. The Cowboys responded with their own long drive, going 62 yards in 12 plays capped off by a 1-yard scoring pass from Tony Romo to fullback Tyler Clutts. The play before the score, Romo threw incomplete, but a pass interference penalty on Tramon Williams brought the ball to the 1-yard line. With the extra point, the Cowboys tied the game 7–7. In the ensuing drive, which brought the game into the second quarter, the Packers drove to the 27-yard line, but Rodgers fumbled the ball and the Cowboys recovered. The Cowboys drove 64 yards in the 5 plays, ending in a 38-yard touchdown pass from Romo to Terrance Williams to give the Cowboys a 14–7 lead. The Packers quickly punted on the next drive, which Dallas took advantage of to drive down close to the end zone. After getting stopped on third down with 1 yard to go, the Cowboys' Dan Bailey attempted a 50-yard field goal, which was blocked by Datone Jones. With only 29 seconds on the clock, the Packers drove 38 yards to the Dallas 22-yard line, scoring on a 40-yard Mason Crosby field goal before the half ended, putting the score at 14–10.

=== Second half ===
Getting the ball back to start the second half, the Packers continued on offense but quickly had to punt after five plays. The Cowboys took over, but running back DeMarco Murray fumbled at the Cowboys' 41-yard line on a tackle by Julius Peppers; the fumble was recovered by Datone Jones at the Cowboys' 44-yard line. The Packers took advantage of the miscue, with Crosby hitting a 30-yard field goal a few plays later to put the score at 14–13. The Cowboys then proceeded to drive 80 yards in just 6 plays, including a 26-yard run by Murray to the 1-yard line. On the next play, Murray scored, increasing the Cowboys' lead to 21–13. The Packers responded with its own long scoring drive; after a holding penalty on the kick-off return, the Packers started at their own 10-yard line. They drove 90 yards in 7 plays, capped off by a 46-yard touchdown pass to Davante Adams. After choosing to attempt an extra point instead of a two-point conversion, the score stood at 21–20 to end the 3rd quarter. On the next Cowboys' drive, Romo took two consecutive sacks from Nick Perry, which resulted in the Cowboys punting back to the Packers. From their own 20, Rodgers engineered an 8-play, 80-yard drive, connecting on a 13-yard pass to Richard Rodgers to put the Packers in the lead, 26–21. Green Bay attempted a two-point conversion, which failed. With the Cowboys taking over from their own 18, their drive started with a 30-yard run by Murray to the Cowboys' 48-yard line. A Joseph Randle run, a 10-yard pass to Bryant, and a 2-yard Murray run put the Cowboys at the Packers' 38-yard line. After being sacked by Mike Neal, Romo connected with Cole Beasley for a 9-yard completion, making it 4th down with 2 yards to go.

==== The controversial play ====
With 4:42 left in the game, the Cowboys decided to try for a first down instead of punting the ball. Romo threw a deep pass to Dez Bryant near the goal line. Being covered by cornerback Sam Shields, Bryant made a leaping catch over Shields, and in an attempt to secure the football for the catch and reach across the goal line for the touchdown, Bryant tucked the ball in his left arm by his elbow while extending out for the spot. The pass was initially ruled a completed catch with Bryant being downed at the Packers' 1-yard line. However, Packers head coach Mike McCarthy threw his challenge flag, arguing that the ball hit the ground before Bryant completed the process of a legal catch.

After a review by Gene Steratore and the other officials, it was determined that Bryant did not properly secure the ball before it hit the ground, thus overturning the call and ruling the pass incomplete. Because Bryant lost control of the ball while going to the ground and only regained control after it hit the ground, the pass did not meet the criteria for a completed catch per NFL rules.

==== End of the game ====
Turning the ball over on downs with 4:06 left to play, the Cowboys' offense would never get the ball back again. After a few more plays, including a 26-yard pass to Davante Adams and a 12-yard pass to Randall Cobb, the Packers secured a 26–21 win. Rodgers finished with 316 yards, three touchdowns and no interceptions, while Romo finished with 191 yards, two touchdowns, and also no interceptions.

=== Box score ===
Divisional Playoffs: Dallas Cowboys vs. Green Bay Packers – Game summary

Quarter	1	2	3	4	Total
Cowboys	7	7	7	0	21
Packers	7	3	10	6	26

at Lambeau Field, Green Bay, Wisconsin

- Date: January 11, 2015
- Game time: 1:05 p.m. EST/12:05 p.m. CST/10:05 a.m. PST
- Game weather: 24 °F (−4 °C), cloudy
- Game attendance: 79,704
- Referee: Gene Steratore
- TV announcers (Fox): Joe Buck (play-by-play), Troy Aikman (color commentator), Erin Andrews, and Chris Myers (sideline reporters)
- Sources: ESPN.com and Pro-Football-Reference.com

Game information

1st quarter

- GB – Andrew Quarless 4-yard pass from Aaron Rodgers (Mason Crosby extra point), 8:30. Packers 7–0. Drive: 10 plays, 60 yards, 4:22.
- DAL – Tyler Clutts 1-yard pass from Tony Romo (Dan Bailey extra point), 1:05. Tied 7–7. Drive: 12 plays, 62 yards, 7:25.

2nd quarter

- DAL – Terrance Williams 38-yard pass from Tony Romo (Dan Bailey extra point), 8:19. Cowboys 14–7. Drive: 5 plays, 64 yards, 2:53.
- GB – Mason Crosby 40-yard field goal, 0:00. Cowboys 14–10. Drive: 5 plays, 38 yards, 0:29.

3rd quarter

- GB – Mason Crosby 30-yard field goal, 7:46. Cowboys 14–13. Drive: 6 plays, 32 yards, 3:18.
- DAL – DeMarco Murray 1-yard run (Dan Bailey extra point), 4:12. Cowboys 21–13. Drive: 6 plays, 80 yards, 3:34.
- GB – Davante Adams 46-yard pass from Aaron Rodgers (Mason Crosby extra point), 1:41. Cowboys 21–20. Drive: 7 plays, 90 yards, 2:31.

4th quarter

- GB – Richard Rodgers 13-yard pass from Aaron Rodgers (two-point conversion failed), 9:10. Packers 26–21. Drive: 8 plays, 8 yards, 4:19.

Green Bay Packers stats

Passing

- Aaron Rodgers – 24/35, 316 yards, 3 touchdowns

Rushing

- Eddie Lacy – 19 rushes, 101 yards
- James Starks – 5 rushes, 16 yards
- John Kuhn – 1 rush, 4 yards
- Randall Cobb – 1 rush, 2 yards
- Aaron Rodgers – 3 rushes, -4 yards

Receiving

- Davante Adams – 7 rec, 117 yards, 1 touchdown
- Randall Cobb – 8 receptions, 116 yards
- Andrew Quarless – 4 receptions, 31 yards, 1 touchdown
- Jordy Nelson – 2 receptions, 22 yards
- Richard Rodgers – 1 receptions, 13 yards, 1 touchdown
- Eddie Lacy – 1 reception, 10 yards
- John Kuhn – 1 reception, 7 yards
Dallas Cowboys stats

Passing

- Tony Romo – 15/19, 191 yards, 2 touchdowns

Rushing

- DeMarco Murray – 25 rushes, 123 yards, 1 touchdown
- Joseph Randle – 2 rushes, 15 yards
- Tony Romo – 1 rush, 7 yards

Receiving

- Jason Witten – 6 rec, 71 yards
- Terrance Williams – 1 reception, 38 yards, 1 touchdown
- Dez Bryant – 3 receptions, 38 yards
- Cole Beasley – 3 receptions, 38 yards
- DeMarco Murray – 1 reception, 5 yards
- Tyler Clutts – 1 reception, 1 yard, 1 touchdown

=== Analysis ===
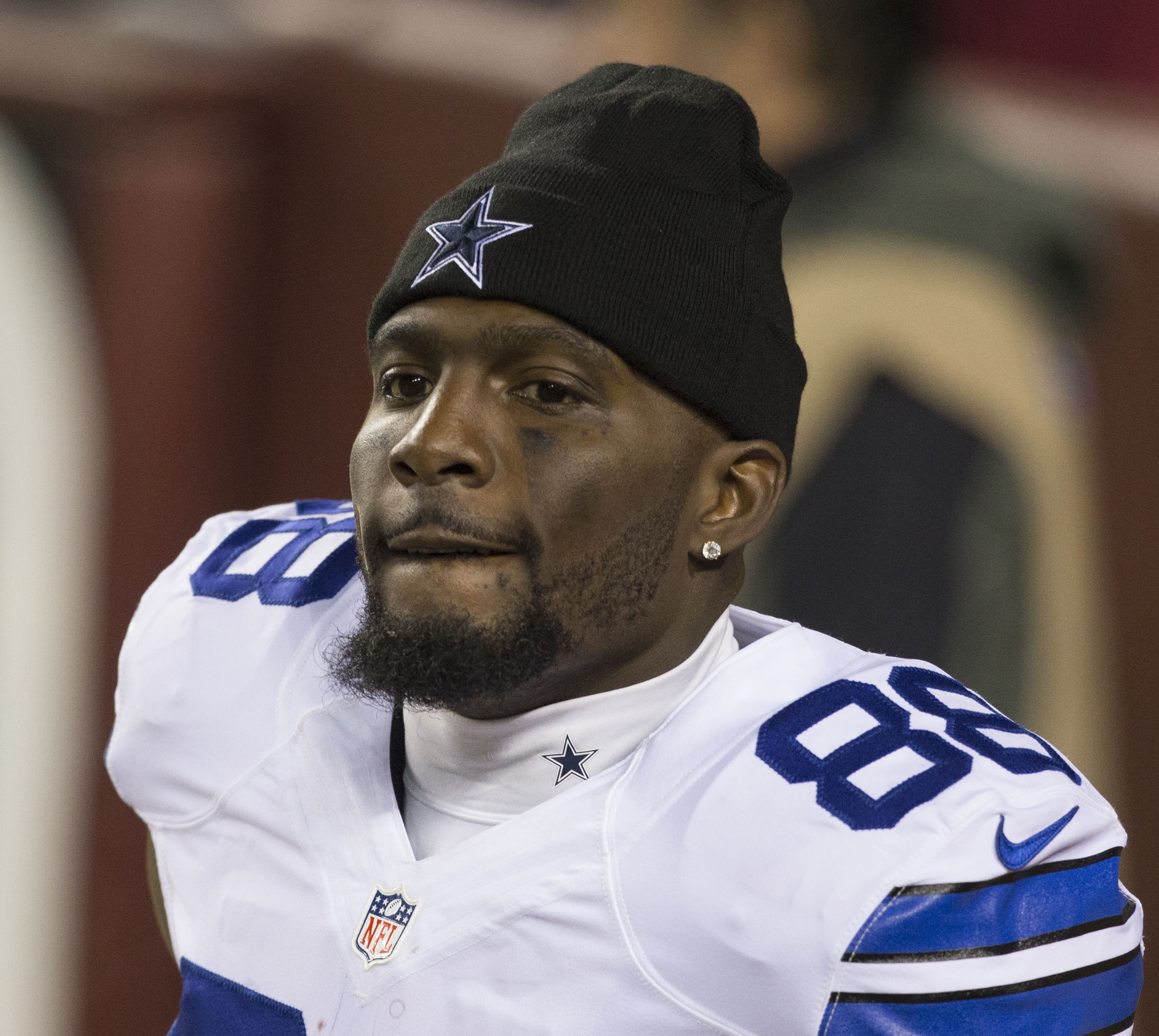
Dez Bryant, the intended recipient of the incomplete pass, continued to plead his case after the game that he caught the ball.

Post-game analysis focused on whether Bryant secured the catch and made a football move by diving towards the end zone before bobbling the ball. There was no dispute on whether the ball moved when it hit the ground as Bryant stretched for the goal line, as replay clearly showed the ball moving. Fox Sports analyst Mike Pereira provided his insights, saying, "I don't agree he made a football move, certainly not in the context of the rule. He's going to the ground, the ball pops out then. Nobody likes this rule...but it wasn't a [touchdown] by the rule". The NFL's director of officiating, Dean Blandino, agreed with this takeaway, stating "By rule he must hold onto it throughout entire process of contacting the ground. He didn't, so it is incomplete". In justifying the decision by the officiating crew after the game, Steratore stated "in our judgment, he maintained possession but continued to fall and never had another act common to the game," continuing by clarifying that Bryant never completed the full process of the catch before the ball become dislodged from his possession.

Following the game, Bryant would describe the overturned catch to the media: "All I know is I had possession, I had possession of the ball coming down, that's possession, right? One, two, reach. Bam, that's possession. That's possession". In regards to the catch rule, Bryant expressed his disdain, stating, "I'm just begging them: please, please take that out. Take that rule out". Cowboys owner Jerry Jones would expand by saying, "any time we have interpretation in our rules, that happens. The judgment on the field, we have a principle that prevails, and it has to be overturned by pretty strong evidence. I didn't see it on that play".

== Outcome ==
The Packers would go on to lose the NFC Championship Game in overtime 28–22 to the Seattle Seahawks. The Packers led 19–7 with just over a two minutes left in the game but gave up a touchdown, an onside kick recovery, another touchdown and two-point conversion, before the Packers kicked a field goal to tie the game. The Seahawks would score a walk-off touchdown pass in overtime to make it to Super Bowl XLIX.

=== Naming ===
Cowboys fans watching the game, angry at the call, demonstrated their frustration by starting the Twitter hashtag #DezCaughtIt. This led to the game being called such names as "Dez Caught It" or the "No-Catch Game".

=== Legacy ===
In 2022, the Milwaukee Journal Sentinel named the play one of the 25 greatest in Packers playoff history. Although the play and the game itself did become part of the Cowboys–Packers rivalry, its impact was primarily felt in the realm of the definition of a catch and future changes to NFL rules. The NFL rulebook at the time stated "If a player goes to the ground in the act of catching a pass, he must maintain control of the ball throughout the process of contacting the ground". The rule was nicknamed the "Calvin Johnson Rule" after a Week 1 game in the 2010 NFL season between the Chicago Bears and the Detroit Lions, which also happened to involve the same referee Gene Steratore controversially overturning a potential game-winning catch for the Lions by Johnson upon further review.

In 2015, the rule for a completed catch was officially changed to state as follows: "A player is considered to be going to the ground if he does not remain upright long enough to demonstrate that he is clearly a runner. If a player goes to the ground in the act of catching a pass (with or without contact by an opponent), he must maintain control of the ball until after his initial contact with the ground, whether in the field of play or the end zone. If he loses control of the ball and the ball touches the ground before he regains control, the pass is incomplete. If he regains control prior [to] the ball touching the ground, the pass is complete." With the change, the rule takes out the process of making a "football move" in order to complete a catch. Dean Blandino discussed the new rule, saying, "For years the requirement for a catch is control, both feet and after that the receiver had to have the ball long enough to perform a [football] act. It was that act common to the game, football move, that created some confusion". The updated rule would require a player to establish themselves as a runner instead of making a football move. It was noted that even with this change, the pass to Bryant would still have been ruled incomplete.

In a 2017 Patriots–Steelers rivalry game, Jesse James caught a ball while falling into the end zone. The play was initially ruled a touchdown, but it was reversed because James did not survive the ground and thus declared an incomplete pass. After the season, the NFL announced it would work to change the catch rule. Kevin Seifert of ESPN reported, per Giants owner John Mara, that the NFL competition committee "appears to have unanimous agreement that controversial catch rulings involving Dez Bryant and Calvin Johnson should have been ruled complete" and was working to "relax the 'going to the ground' requirement". In March 2018, the rule was officially changed to remove the necessity of "surviving the ground", thus a catch would require control of the ball, two feet or another body part in the field of the play and completing a football move, such as a third step or extending the ball towards the line-to-gain. The NFL was hopeful of the new rule, saying "it will eradicate some of the frustration fans, coaches and players had with apparent catches – like Cowboys receiver Dez Bryant's against Green Bay in the 2014 playoffs, or Steelers tight end Jesse James' reversed TD against the Patriots this past season – being deemed incomplete". With the rule change, it was noted that a number of overturned catches would actually be completions, including the pass to Dez Bryant. Dean Blandino did observe at the time that this rule change may just move the controversy to other issues, such as whether a football move was actually performed. The debate on what constitutes a catch in the NFL continued, with the pass to Bryant still being noted as an instigator for necessary clarification.

== See also ==
- List of nicknamed NFL games and plays
