= 2014–15 NFL playoffs =

American football tournament

- Dates: January 3–February 1, 2015
- Season: 2014
- Teams: 12
- Games played: 11
- Super Bowl XLIX site: University of Phoenix Stadium; Glendale, Arizona
- Defending champions: Seattle Seahawks
- Champion: New England Patriots (4th title)
- Runner-up: Seattle Seahawks
- Conference runners-up: Green Bay Packers; Indianapolis Colts
NFL playoffs
← 2013–14	2015–16 →

The National Football League playoffs for the 2014 season began on January 3, 2015. The postseason tournament concluded with the New England Patriots defeating the Seattle Seahawks in Super Bowl XLIX, 28–24, on February 1, at University of Phoenix Stadium in Glendale, Arizona.

== Participants ==
Within each conference, the four division winners and the top two non-division winners with the best overall regular season records) qualified for the playoffs. The four division winners are seeded 1–4 based on their overall won-lost-tied record, and the wild card teams are seeded 5–6. The NFL does not use a fixed bracket playoff system, and there are no restrictions regarding teams from the same division matching up in any round. In the first round, dubbed the wild-card playoffs or wild-card weekend, the third-seeded division winner hosts the sixth-seed wild card, and the fourth seed hosts the fifth. The 1 and 2 seeds from each conference received a first-round bye. In the second round, the divisional playoffs, the number 1 seed hosts the worst-surviving seed from the first round (seed 4, 5, or 6), while the number 2 seed will play the other team (seed 3, 4, or 5). The two surviving teams from each conference's divisional playoff games met in the respective AFC and NFC Conference Championship games, hosted by the higher seed. Although the Super Bowl, the championship round of the playoffs, is played at a neutral site, the designated home team is based on an annual rotation by conference.

Playoff seeds
Seed	AFC	NFC
1	New England Patriots (East winner)	Seattle Seahawks (West winner)
2	Denver Broncos (West winner)	Green Bay Packers (North winner)
3	Pittsburgh Steelers (North winner)	Dallas Cowboys (East winner)
4	Indianapolis Colts (South winner)	Carolina Panthers (South winner)
5	Cincinnati Bengals (wild card)	Arizona Cardinals (wild card)
6	Baltimore Ravens (wild card)	Detroit Lions (wild card)

== Bracket ==
Jan 4 – Lucas Oil Stadium	Jan 11 – Sports Authority Field at Mile High
5	Cincinnati	10
4	Indianapolis	24
4	Indianapolis	26	Jan 18 – Gillette Stadium
2	Denver	13
AFC
Jan 3 – Heinz Field	4	Indianapolis	7
Jan 10 – Gillette Stadium
1	New England	45
6	Baltimore	30	AFC Championship
6	Baltimore	31
3	Pittsburgh	17	Feb 1 – University of Phoenix Stadium
1	New England	35
Wild-card round
Divisional round
Jan 4 – AT&T Stadium	A1	New England	28
Jan 11 – Lambeau Field
N1	Seattle	24
6	Detroit	20	Super Bowl XLIX
3	Dallas	21
3	Dallas	24	Jan 18 – CenturyLink Field
2	Green Bay	26
NFC
Jan 3 – Bank of America Stadium	2	Green Bay	22
Jan 10 – CenturyLink Field
1	Seattle	28*
5	Arizona	16	NFC Championship
4	Carolina	17
4	Carolina	27
1	Seattle	31

* Indicates overtime victory

== Schedule ==
Round	Away team	Score	Home team	Date	Kickoff (ET / UTC-5)	TV	Viewers (millions)	TV Rating
Wild-card round	Arizona Cardinals	16–27	Carolina Panthers	January 3, 2015	4:35 p.m.	ESPN (Note: ESPN's game was simulcast locally on KASW in Phoenix and WJZY in Charlotte)	21.7	12.5
Wild-card round	Baltimore Ravens	30–17	Pittsburgh Steelers	January 3, 2015	8:15 p.m.	NBC	27.9	15.8
Wild-card round	Cincinnati Bengals	10–26	Indianapolis Colts	January 4, 2015	1:05 p.m.	CBS	28.3	17.0
Wild-card round	Detroit Lions	20–24	Dallas Cowboys	January 4, 2015	4:40 p.m.	Fox	42.3	23.6
Divisional round	Baltimore Ravens	31–35	New England Patriots	January 10, 2015	4:35 p.m.	NBC	34.1	19.6
Divisional round	Carolina Panthers	17–31	Seattle Seahawks	January 10, 2015	8:15 p.m.	Fox	31.0	17.2
Divisional round	Dallas Cowboys	21–26	Green Bay Packers	January 11, 2015	1:05 p.m.	Fox	44.4	24.9
Divisional round	Indianapolis Colts	24–13	Denver Broncos	January 11, 2015	4:40 p.m.	CBS	41.8	23.3
Conference championships	Green Bay Packers	22–28 (OT)	Seattle Seahawks	January 18, 2015	3:05 p.m.	Fox	49.8	27.4
Conference championships	Indianapolis Colts	7–45	New England Patriots	January 18, 2015	6:50 p.m.	CBS	42.1	22.5
Super Bowl XLIX University of Phoenix Stadium Glendale, Arizona	New England Patriots	28–24	Seattle Seahawks	February 1, 2015	6:30 p.m.	NBC	114.4	47.5

== Wild-card round ==
=== Saturday, January 3, 2015 ===
==== NFC: Carolina Panthers 27, Arizona Cardinals 16 ====
Arizona Cardinals vs. Carolina Panthers – Game summary

Quarter	1	2	3	4	Total
Cardinals	0	14	0	2	16
Panthers	10	3	14	0	27

at Bank of America Stadium, Charlotte, North Carolina

- Date: January 3
- Game time: 4:35 p.m. EST/2:35 p.m. MST/1:35 p.m. PST
- Game weather: 51 °F (11 °C), rain
- Game attendance: 71,849
- Referee: Ed Hochuli
- TV announcers (ESPN): Mike Tirico (play-by-play), Jon Gruden (color commentator), and Lisa Salters (sideline reporter)
- Recap, Gamebook

Game information

1st quarter

- CAR – Graham Gano 47-yard field goal, 11:27. Panthers 3–0. Drive: 7 plays, 19 yards, 2:03.
- CAR – Jonathan Stewart 13-yard run (Graham Gano kick), 5:21. Panthers 10–0. Drive: 8 plays, 57 yards, 3:51.

2nd quarter

- ARI – Darren Fells 1-yard pass from Ryan Lindley (Chandler Catanzaro kick), 14:56. Panthers 10–7. Drive: 6 plays, 30 yards, 2:15.
- ARI – Marion Grice 1-yard run (Chandler Catanzaro kick), 2:50. Cardinals 14–10. Drive: 4 plays, 17 yards, 2:04.
- CAR – Graham Gano 39-yard field goal, 0:15. Cardinals 14–13. Drive: 9 plays, 59 yards, 2:35.

3rd quarter

- CAR – Fozzy Whittaker 39-yard pass from Cam Newton (Graham Gano kick), 5:36. Panthers 20–14. Drive: 1 play, 39 yards, 0:14.
- CAR – Mike Tolbert 1-yard pass from Cam Newton (Graham Gano kick), 4:04. Panthers 27–14. Drive: 3 play, 3 yards, 1:24.

4th quarter

- ARI – Brad Nortman tackled in endzone by Justin Bethel for a safety, 0:03. Panthers 27–16.

Leading passers

- ARI – Ryan Lindley – 16/28, 82 yards, TD, 2 INT
- CAR – Cam Newton – 18/32, 198 yards, 2 TD, INT

Leading rushers

- ARI – Kerwynn Williams – 10 rushes, 23 yards
- CAR – Jonathan Stewart – 24 rushes, 123 yards, TD

Leading receivers

- ARI – John Brown – 4 rec, 34 yards
- CAR – Fozzy Whittaker – 1 rec, 39 yards, TD

Carolina's defense forced three turnovers and held Arizona to an NFL playoff record low of 78 total yards as they advanced to their first postseason win since the 2005 season.

Short punts by Drew Butler on Arizona's first two drives gave the Panthers excellent field position from the Cardinals' 48-yard line and their own 43-yard line on their first two possessions, which they converted into ten points: A 48-yard Graham Gano field goal and a 13-yard touchdown run by Jonathan Stewart. The Cardinals had to punt again on their next drive, but Panthers receiver Brenton Bersin muffed the kick and Justin Bethel recovered the ball for Arizona on the Carolina 30-yard line. A 15-yard roughing the passer penalty on defensive end Charles Johnson and a 14-yard reception by Larry Fitzgerald moved the ball to the 1-yard line, where Ryan Lindley finished the drive with a touchdown pass to tight end Darren Fells on the first play of the second quarter, cutting the score to 10–7.

Carolina responded by moving the ball to the Cardinals' 25-yard line, but came up empty when Gano missed a 43-yard field goal attempt. Later in the quarter, Antonio Cromartie intercepted a pass from Cam Newton and returned it 50 yards to the Panthers' 17-yard line. Three plays later, the Cardinals took their first lead of the game, 14–10, on a 1-yard touchdown run by rookie running back Marion Grice. Grice lost the ball as he went into the end zone, and the play was initially ruled a fumble recovered by the Panthers. But after a replay review, the call was reversed on grounds that Grice crossed the goal line before the ball came out of his hands. The Panthers struck back with a 59-yard drive, including Newton's 23-yard completion to receiver Corey Brown, to score on Gano's 39-yard field goal, making the score 14–13 at the end of the half.

In the second half, the Panthers completely took over the game, holding Arizona to just 12 yards from scrimmage. Early in the third quarter, Butler's 31-yard punt gave Carolina the ball on the Cardinals' 39-yard line. On the next play, running back Fozzy Whittaker caught a screen pass from Newton and raced all the way to end zone to retake the lead for his team at 20–14. Then Melvin White forced a fumble from Cardinals kick returner Ted Ginn Jr., which Kevin Reddick recovered for Carolina on the Arizona 3-yard line. Two plays later, Newton's 1-yard touchdown pass to fullback Mike Tolbert increased their lead to 27–14.

At this point, 4:04 remained in the third quarter, but the Panthers defense would shut out Arizona's offense for the rest of the game. In the fourth quarter, the Cardinals had a chance to get back in the game when linebacker Sam Acho forced a fumble while sacking Newton, which safety Rashad Johnson picked up and returned 30 yards to the Panthers' 8-yard line. But on the next play, Lindley was intercepted by linebacker Luke Kuechly. Later on, they got another scoring chance when Panthers punter Brad Nortman fumbled a snap and was forced out of bounds at the Panthers' 47-yard line. But once again the Cardinals lost a turnover, this time an interception by safety Tre Boston. Arizona would not score again until Nortman deliberately downed the ball in the end zone for a safety with three seconds left on the clock, making the final score 27–16.

Lindley, filling in for injured starter Carson Palmer and injured backup Drew Stanton, completed 16 out of 28 passes, but for just 82 yards and two interceptions. Newton threw for 198 yards with two touchdowns and an interception, while also rushing for 35 yards. Stewart was the top rusher for the game with 123 yards and a touchdown, and Charles Johnson had 2½ sacks. This was the second time in NFL history that a team made the playoffs with a losing record and still won their first game.

This was the second postseason meeting between the Cardinals and Panthers. Arizona won the prior meeting 33–13 in the 2008 NFC Divisional playoffs.

==== AFC: Baltimore Ravens 30, Pittsburgh Steelers 17 ====
Baltimore Ravens vs. Pittsburgh Steelers – Game summary

Quarter	1	2	3	4	Total
Ravens	0	10	10	10	30
Steelers	3	6	0	8	17

at Heinz Field, Pittsburgh, Pennsylvania

- Date: January 3
- Game time: 8:15 p.m. EST/5:15 p.m. PST
- Game weather: 48 °F (9 °C), cloudy
- Game attendance: 62,780
- Referee: Clete Blakeman
- TV announcers (NBC): Al Michaels (play-by-play), Cris Collinsworth (color commentator), and Michele Tafoya (sideline reporter)
- Recap, Gamebook

Game information

1st quarter

- PIT – Shaun Suisham 45-yard field goal, 1:29. Steelers 3–0. Drive: 9 plays, 33 yards, 5:36.

2nd quarter

- BAL – Bernard Pierce 5-yard run (Justin Tucker kick), 12:28. Ravens 7–3. Drive: 8 plays, 80 yards, 4:01.
- PIT – Shaun Suisham 22-yard field goal, 5:40. Ravens 7–6. Drive: 12 plays, 82 yards, 6:48.
- BAL – Justin Tucker 28-yard field goal, 2:41. Ravens 10–6. Drive: 10 plays, 70 yards, 2:59.
- PIT – Shaun Suisham 47-yard field goal, 0:37. Ravens 10–9. Drive: 9 plays, 53 yards, 2:04.

3rd quarter

- BAL – Justin Tucker 45-yard field goal, 10:06. Ravens 13–9. Drive: 9 plays, 57 yards, 4:54.
- BAL – Torrey Smith 11-yard pass from Joe Flacco (Justin Tucker kick), 4:13. Ravens 20–9. Drive: 6 plays, 69 yards, 3:25.

4th quarter

- PIT – Martavis Bryant 6-yard pass from Ben Roethlisberger (pass failed), 11:01. Ravens 20–15. Drive: 2 plays, 45 yards, 0:50.
- BAL – Justin Tucker 52-yard field goal, 8:47. Ravens 23–15. Drive: 7 plays, 29 yards, 2:14.
- BAL – Crockett Gillmore 21-yard pass from Joe Flacco (Justin Tucker kick), 7:56. Ravens 30–15. Drive: 1 play, 21 yards, 0:07.
- PIT – Punt blocked by Shamarko Thomas out of bounds in endzone for a safety, 1:56. Ravens 30–17.

Leading passers

- BAL – Joe Flacco – 18/29, 259 yards, 2 TD
- PIT – Ben Roethlisberger – 31/45, 334 yards, TD, 2 INT

Leading rushers

- BAL – Justin Forsett – 16 rushes, 36 yards
- PIT – Josh Harris – 9 rushes, 25 yards

Leading receivers

- BAL – Steve Smith Sr. – 5 rec, 101 yards
- PIT – Antonio Brown – 9 rec, 117 yards

Baltimore forced three turnovers and scored on 6-of-9 possessions to defeat Pittsburgh on the road for the first time in franchise playoff history.

The Steelers scored first with a 43-yard drive, including a 22-yard completion from Ben Roethlisberger to Martavis Bryant, that ended on a 45-yard Shaun Suisham field goal. Baltimore responded with a 9-play, 80-yard drive that gave them a 7–3 lead on Bernard Pierce's 5-yard touchdown run with 12:28 left in the second quarter. Roethlisberger struck back with an 18-yard completion to Antonio Brown and a 30-yarder to tight end Heath Miller that set up Suisham's 22-yard field goal. Baltimore quarterback Joe Flacco countered with a 23-yard pass to Steve Smith Sr. and a 19-yard completion to Owen Daniels on the way to a 28-yard field goal by Justin Tucker, making the score 10–6. With 42 seconds left in the half, Suisham kicked a 47-yard field goal that cut the score to 10-9 going into halftime.

On the Ravens' opening drive of the second half, Flacco completed a 17-yard pass to Torrey Smith on third and 12, allowing the team to hang onto the ball and drive to a 45-yard field goal by Tucker. Then after a Steelers punt, Flacco hooked up with Smith Sr. for a 40-yard completion before throwing an 11-yard touchdown pass to Smith, increasing the team's lead to 20–9.

Early in the fourth quarter, Pittsburgh defensive end Stephon Tuitt recovered a fumble from running back Justin Forsett on the Ravens' 45-yard line. Roethlisberger completed a 44-yard pass to Brown on the next play, and eventually got the ball into the end zone with a 6-yard toss to Bryant. Their two-point conversion attempt failed, but the Steelers had cut their deficit to one score at 20–15. However, they would get no closer. Baltimore responded with a 23-yard reception by Daniels that set up Tucker's 52-yard field goal. Then linebacker Terrell Suggs intercepted a pass from Roethlisberger, and Flacco increased the Ravens' lead to 30–15 with a 21-yard touchdown pass to tight end Crockett Gillmore on the next play. The Steelers responded with a drive to the Baltimore 14-yard line, but came up empty when safety Darian Stewart picked off a pass from Roethlisberger in the end zone. Pittsburgh did manage two more points when Shamarko Thomas blocked Sam Koch's punt, knocking the ball through the end zone for a safety. But after the free kick, Stewart put the game away by recovering a fumble from Miller.

Roethlisbeger finished the day 31-for-44 for 334 yards and a touchdown, with two interceptions. His top target was Brown, who caught nine passes for 117 yards. Flacco was 18-for-29 for 255 yards and two touchdowns, while Smith Sr. was the Ravens top receiver with five receptions for 101 yards.

The win gave the Ravens their first postseason victory over the Steelers in four tries, having previously lost to them in 2001, 2008, and 2010, all at Heinz Field. It is the Steelers' first loss in the playoffs against a division opponent since losing to the Philadelphia Eagles in the 1947 NFL Eastern Division playoff, and first-ever postseason loss to an AFC Central/AFC North rival since the 1970 merger. For the first time in eight tries, a Baltimore-based major professional sports team defeated its Pittsburgh counterpart in that sport's postseason tournament.

This was the fourth postseason meeting between the Ravens and Steelers. Pittsburgh won all three prior meetings at home, including 31–24 in the 2010 AFC Divisional playoffs.

=== Sunday, January 4, 2015 ===
==== AFC: Indianapolis Colts 26, Cincinnati Bengals 10 ====
Cincinnati Bengals vs. Indianapolis Colts – Game summary

Quarter	1	2	3	4	Total
Bengals	7	3	0	0	10
Colts	7	6	10	3	26

at Lucas Oil Stadium, Indianapolis, Indiana

- Date: January 4
- Game time: 1:05 p.m. EST/10:05 am PST
- Game weather: Played indoors (retractable roof closed)
- Game attendance: 63,385
- Referee: Carl Cheffers
- TV announcers (CBS): Jim Nantz (play-by-play), Phil Simms (color commentator), and Tracy Wolfson (sideline reporter)
- Recap, Gamebook

Game information

1st quarter

- IND – Dan Herron 2-yard run (Adam Vinatieri kick), 11:05. Colts 7–0. Drive: 9 plays, 71 yards, 3:55.
- CIN – Jeremy Hill 1-yard run (Mike Nugent kick), 1:28. Tied 7–7. Drive: 9 plays, 74 yards, 4:26.

2nd quarter

- IND – Adam Vinatieri 38-yard field goal, 12:41. Colts 10–7. Drive: 11 plays, 71 yards, 3:47.
- IND – Adam Vinatieri 29-yard field goal, 8:34. Colts 13–7. Drive: 6 plays, 53 yards, 2:17.
- CIN – Mike Nugent 57-yard field goal, 0:10. Colts 13–10. Drive: 7 plays, 20 yards, 1:39.

3rd quarter

- IND – Donte Moncrief 36-yard pass from Andrew Luck (Adam Vinatieri kick), 7:48. Colts 20–10. Drive: 6 plays, 61 yards, 2:06.
- IND – Adam Vinatieri 22-yard field goal, 1:31. Colts 23–10. Drive: 10 plays, 53 yards, 4:47.

4th quarter

- IND – Adam Vinatieri 53-yard field goal, 11:31. Colts 26–10. Drive: 6 plays, 12 yards, 3:19.

Leading passers

- CIN – Andy Dalton – 18/35, 155 yards
- IND – Andrew Luck – 31/44, 376 yards, TD

Leading rushers

- CIN – Jeremy Hill – 13 rushes, 47 yards, TD
- IND – Dan Herron – 12 rushes, 56 yards, TD

Leading receivers

- CIN – Giovani Bernard – 8 rec, 46 yards
- IND – T. Y. Hilton – 6 rec, 103 yards

The Colts scored on their opening drive, advancing the ball 71 yards in nine plays, including a 27-yard burst by Dan Herron, on the way to Herron's 2-yard touchdown run. After an exchange of punts, an 18-yard run by Bengals running back Jeremy Hill and Andy Dalton's 26-yard completion to Rex Burkhead sparked a 74-yard, 9-play drive that tied the game with Hill's 1-yard score.

In the second quarter, Colts quarterback Andrew Luck completed a 30-yard pass to T. Y. Hilton that set up Adam Vinatieri's 38-yard field goal, putting the team back in front at 10–7. Then after a punt, Luck completed a 45-yard pass to Hakeem Nicks, leading to another Vinatieri field goal that made the score 13–7. The Bengals were subsequently forced to punt again, but with just under two minutes left in the half, cornerback Darqueze Dennard forced a fumble from Herron that safety Reggie Nelson recovered and returned six yards to the Cincinnati 41-yard line. Dalton then led the team to the Colts' 39-yard line, where Mike Nugent made a 57-yard field goal, the second longest kick in NFL playoff history, cutting the score to 13-10 going into halftime.

The Colts' defense dominated the Bengals in the second half, forcing them to a three-and-out on their first four drives. On the opposing side, Luck threw a 36-yard touchdown to rookie receiver Donte Moncrief with 7:48 left in the third quarter. Then after a punt, the Colts drove 57 yards and scored on Vinatieri's 22-yard field goal, bringing the score to 23–10. On their next possession, Vinatieri made his fourth field goal of the day, a franchise playoff record 53-yard kick, giving the Colts a 26–10 lead. Meanwhile, the Bengals' following three possessions would result in another punt, a lost fumble by Dalton, and time expiring in the game.

Dalton finished the game 18-for-35 for 155 yards, along with 34 yards on the ground. Luck completed 31 of 44 passes for 376 yards and a touchdown, while also rushing for 18 yards. Hilton was his top target, with six catches for 103 yards. Herron had 56 rushing yards and ten receptions for 85 yards.

The game marked another round of dismal postseason milestones for the Bengals, who have not won a playoff game since the 1990 season, the longest active streak in the NFL. They became the first team in NFL history to lose in the opening round of the playoffs for four consecutive seasons, while coach Marvin Lewis tied Jim E. Mora for the worst coaching record in playoff history (0–6). The Bengals have now lost seven consecutive playoff games, the second highest total ever behind the Detroit Lions and Kansas City Chiefs' record of eight.

This was the second postseason meeting between the Bengals and Colts. The then-Baltimore Colts won the prior meeting 17–0 in the 1970 AFC Divisional playoffs.

==== NFC: Dallas Cowboys 24, Detroit Lions 20 ====
Detroit Lions vs. Dallas Cowboys – Game summary

Quarter	1	2	3	4	Total
Lions	14	3	3	0	20
Cowboys	0	7	7	10	24

at AT&T Stadium, Arlington, Texas

- Date: January 4
- Game time: 4:40 p.m. EST/3:40 p.m. CST/1:40 p.m. PST
- Game weather: Played indoors (retractable roof closed)
- Game attendance: 91,410
- Referee: Pete Morelli
- TV announcers (Fox): Joe Buck (play-by-play), Troy Aikman (color commentator), Erin Andrews, and Chris Myers (sideline reporters)
- Recap, Gamebook

Game information

1st quarter

- DET – Golden Tate 51-yard pass from Matthew Stafford (Matt Prater kick), 11:22. Lions 7–0. Drive: 4 plays, 62 yards, 2:04.
- DET – Reggie Bush 18-yard run (Matt Prater kick), 1:57. Lions 14–0. Drive: 14 plays, 99 yards, 7:10.

2nd quarter

- DAL – Terrance Williams 76-yard pass from Tony Romo (Dan Bailey kick), 1:37. Lions 14–7. Drive: 3 plays, 74 yards, 0:38.
- DET – Matt Prater 39-yard field goal, 0:03. Lions 17–7. Drive: 10 plays, 59 yards, 1:34.

3rd quarter

- DET – Matt Prater 37-yard field goal, 8:41. Lions 20–7. Drive: 8 plays, 50 yards, 4:03.
- DAL – DeMarco Murray 1-yard run (Dan Bailey kick), 2:54. Lions 20–14. Drive: 10 plays, 80 yards, 5:47.

4th quarter

- DAL – Dan Bailey 51-yard field goal, 12:16. Lions 20–17. Drive: 7 plays, 36 yards, 4:00.
- DAL – Terrance Williams 8-yard pass from Tony Romo (Dan Bailey kick), 2:32. Cowboys 24–20. Drive: 11 plays, 59 yards, 5:38.

Leading passers

- DET – Matthew Stafford – 28/42, 323 yards, TD, INT
- DAL – Tony Romo – 19/31, 293 yards, 2 TD

Leading rushers

- DET – Joique Bell – 12 rushes, 43 yards
- DAL – DeMarco Murray – 19 rushes, 75 yards, TD

Leading receivers

- DET – Golden Tate – 6 rec, 89 yards, TD
- DAL – Terrance Williams – 3 rec, 92 yards, 2 TD

Dallas faced an early 14-point deficit and trailed for most of the time in regulation, but after a controversial non-call on an apparent pass interference against their defense in the fourth quarter, quarterback Tony Romo led the team 59 yards for the game winning score.

Detroit forced a three-and-out on Dallas' opening possession and then scored on their own with Matthew Stafford's 51-yard touchdown pass to receiver Golden Tate. Later on, Dallas punter Chris Jones pinned the Lions back at their own 1-yard line with a 51-yard kick. The Lions were forced to punt from the 6-yard line, but Cowboys linebacker Dekoda Watson was penalized for running into the punter on the play, giving Detroit a first down. Taking full advantage of their second chance, Detroit ended up driving 99 yards in 14 plays to score on an 18-yard burst by Reggie Bush, giving them a 14–0 lead with less than two minutes left in the first quarter.

There would be no more scoring until 1:50 remained in the second quarter, when Dallas had the ball on their own 24-yard line. Romo fired a pass to receiver Terrance Williams, who caught the ball in stride on a 10-yard slant and took off past the defense for a 76-yard touchdown completion, cutting the score to 14–7. Stafford responded by completing 6-of-8 passes for 59 yards, including a 19-yard completion to Calvin Johnson, on a 59-yard drive that ended with Matt Prater's 39-yard field goal, putting the team up 17-7 going into halftime.

Dallas had a great opportunity to score when linebacker Kyle Wilber intercepted a pass from Stafford and returned it five yards to the Lions' 19-yard line on the first play of the second half. However, after picking up nine yards with their first two plays, Romo was sacked for a 13-yard loss by Ezekiel Ansah on third and 1, and then Dan Bailey missed a 43-yard field goal. Stafford then hooked up with Johnson for a 28-yard completion that led to Prater's 37-yard field goal, increasing Detroit's lead to 20–7. However, Dallas responded with an 80-yard scoring drive, featuring a 43-yard reception by receiver Dez Bryant, that ended with a 1-yard touchdown run by DeMarco Murray on fourth and goal, trimming their deficit to one possession, 20–14.

On the second to last play of the third quarter, Romo threw a 19-yard completion to Cole Beasley. Then on the first play of the fourth quarter, an unnecessary roughness penalty on linebacker Tahir Whitehead turned Beasley's 12-yard reception into a 27-yard gain. The Cowboys were pushed back to the Detroit 33-yard line after Romo was sacked on consecutive plays by Ndamukong Suh, but Bailey made a 51-yard field goal, cutting the score to 20–17. On the Lions' ensuing possession, the most controversial play of the game occurred. Stafford threw a pass intended for tight end Brandon Pettigrew who was being covered by Cowboys rookie linebacker Anthony Hitchens. Hitchens held Pettigrew's jersey before knocking him down as the pass fell incomplete. Back judge Lee Dyer threw a flag for defensive pass interference. After referee Pete Morelli announced the penalty, head linesman Jerry Bergman determined that Hitchens' actions did not warrant a penalty. Morelli then announced there was no foul on the play and the flag was picked up. The decision to change the initial call received significant media attention after the game and was widely decried as incorrect. NFL Vice President of Officiating Dean Blandino stated that the no-call on pass interference was debatable, but holding definitely should have been called on the play.

The reversed call turned out to be crucial. Detroit tried to force the Cowboys to go offside on fourth and 1, but failed to do so and were penalized five yards for delay of game. Now faced with fourth and 6, Detroit decided to punt, and Sam Martin, who had averaged 48 yards on his last three kicks, shanked the ball, sending it out of bounds after netting just 10 yards to the Cowboys' 41-yard line. Romo then led the Cowboys 59 yards in 14 plays for the game-winning score, converting a fourth down and two third downs along the way. Faced with fourth and 6 from the Detroit 42-yard line, Romo completed a 21-yard pass to tight end Jason Witten. The NFL later admitted that Suh was held on the play despite the game officials' no-call. Later on, Romo threw an incomplete pass on third and 7, but a defensive holding call on DeAndre Levy gave Dallas a first down on the Lions' 7-yard line. Two plays later, on third and 8, Romo finished the drive with a touchdown pass to Williams, giving the Cowboys their first lead of the game at 24–20 with 2:32 left in regulation. A few plays into Detroit's ensuing drive, Stafford lost a fumble that was recovered by Dallas rookie defensive end DeMarcus Lawrence. Instead of falling on the ball, he returned it and ended up fumbling it back to Detroit. The Lions got the ball back and drove into Cowboys territory, but on fourth and 3 on the Cowboys' 42-yard line, Lawrence redeemed himself and forced and recovered a fumble from Stafford, enabling the Cowboys to run out the rest of the clock.

Stafford completed 28 of 42 passes for 323 yards and a touchdown, with an interception. Tate caught eight passes for 89 yards and a touchdown, while Johnson had five catches for 85 yards. Romo finished 19-for-31 for 293 yards and two touchdowns. Williams caught three passes for 93 yards and two scores. Murray rushed for 75 yards and a touchdown, while also catching three passes for 22 yards.

This was the third postseason meeting between the Lions and Cowboys. Both teams split the prior two meetings. The last meeting was won by Detroit in the 1991 NFC Divisional playoffs which was their only playoff win in the Super Bowl era until 2023.

== Divisional round ==
=== Saturday, January 10, 2015 ===
==== AFC: New England Patriots 35, Baltimore Ravens 31 ====
Baltimore Ravens vs. New England Patriots – Game summary

Quarter	1	2	3	4	Total
Ravens	14	7	7	3	31
Patriots	7	7	14	7	35

at Gillette Stadium, Foxborough, Massachusetts

- Date: January 10
- Game time: 4:35 p.m. EST/1:35 p.m. PST
- Game weather: 20 °F (−7 °C), clear
- Game attendance: 68,756
- Referee: Bill Vinovich
- TV announcers (NBC): Al Michaels (play-by-play), Cris Collinsworth (color commentator), and Michele Tafoya (sideline reporter)
- Recap, Gamebook

Game information

1st Quarter

- BAL – Kamar Aiken 19-yard pass from Joe Flacco (Justin Tucker kick), 12:18. Ravens 7–0. Drive: 5 plays, 71 yards, 2:42.
- BAL – Steve Smith Sr. 9-yard pass from Joe Flacco (Justin Tucker kick), 4:44. Ravens 14–0. Drive: 11 plays, 79 yards, 6:00.
- NE – Tom Brady 4-yard run (Stephen Gostkowski kick), 0:48. Ravens 14–7. Drive: 8 plays, 78 yards, 3:56.

2nd Quarter

- NE – Danny Amendola 15-yard pass from Tom Brady (Stephen Gostkowski kick), 3:37. Tied 14–14. Drive: 10 plays, 67 yards, 3:36.
- BAL – Owen Daniels 11-yard pass from Joe Flacco (Justin Tucker kick), 0:10. Ravens 21–14. Drive: 6 plays, 57 yards, 0:53.

3rd Quarter

- BAL – Justin Forsett 16-yard pass from Joe Flacco (Justin Tucker kick), 10:22. Ravens 28–14. Drive: 9 plays, 70 yards, 3:40.
- NE – Rob Gronkowski 5-yard pass from Tom Brady (Stephen Gostkowski kick), 6:48. Ravens 28–21. Drive: 9 plays, 80 yards, 3:34.
- NE – Danny Amendola 51-yard pass from Julian Edelman (Stephen Gostkowski kick), 4:20. Tied 28–28. Drive: 3 plays, 70 yards, 1:13.

4th Quarter

- BAL – Justin Tucker 25-yard field goal, 10:17. Ravens 31–28. Drive: 16 plays, 73 yards, 7:52.
- NE – Brandon LaFell 23-yard pass from Tom Brady (Stephen Gostkowski kick), 5:13. Patriots 35–31. Drive: 10 plays, 74 yards, 5:04.

Leading passers

- BAL – Joe Flacco – 28/45, 292 yards, 4 TD, 2 INT
- NE – Tom Brady – 33/50, 367 yards, 3 TD, INT

Leading rushers

- BAL – Justin Forsett – 24 rushes, 129 yards
- NE – Brandon Bolden – 3 rushes, 7 yards

Leading receivers

- BAL – Torrey Smith – 3 rec, 62 yards
- NE – Rob Gronkowski – 7 rec, 108 yards, TD

With only 13 rushing attempts for 14 total yards, New England put the game almost entirely in the hands of quarterback Tom Brady, who proved up to the task, completing 33 of 50 passes for 367 yards and three touchdowns while also rushing for a score as he led the team back from two 14-point deficits to earn their fourth consecutive AFC Championship Game and their ninth in his 14 years as the team's starter.

Baltimore stormed to an early lead on their first drive, as Joe Flacco connected with Steve Smith Sr. for 19 yards and Torrey Smith for 22 before getting the ball into the end zone with a 19-yard completion to Kamar Aiken. Following a New England punt, Ravens running back Justin Forsett rushed four times for 32 yards, while Flacco completed five of six passes for 40 yards, the last one a 9-yard touchdown pass to Smith Sr. to give Baltimore a 14–0 lead with 4:44 left in the first quarter.

However, this time New England managed to respond. Faced with third and 8 from his own 24-yard line, Brady completed a 16-yard pass to tight end Rob Gronkowski. On the next play, he completed a 46-yard pass to Gronkowski on the Ravens' 14-yard line, and eventually he finished the 8-play, 78-yard drive with a 4-yard touchdown run. After the next three drives ended in punts, New England drove 67 yards, including a 23-yard reception by Gronkowski on third and 8, to tie the score at 14–14 with Brady's 15-yard touchdown pass to Danny Amendola with 3:37 left in the second quarter. But just before halftime, Ravens linebacker Daryl Smith intercepted a pass from Brady at the Baltimore 43-yard line. Aided by a 20-yard pass interference penalty, the Ravens drove 57 yards in six plays and took a 21–14 lead on Flacco's 11-yard touchdown pass to tight end Owen Daniels in the back of the end zone with 10 seconds left in the half.

Baltimore retook their 14-point lead with the first drive of the second half, after Flacco's 35-yard completion to Smith on the Patriots' 1-yard line. A taunting penalty against Smith moved the ball back to the 16-yard line, but the Ravens still scored on the next play with Flacco's 16-yard completion to Forsett to make the score 28–14. New England responded by making some key adjustments to their formation for their ensuing drive. Having already lost starting center Bryan Stork for the game with an injury, the Patriots went with four linemen, while playing tight end Michael Hoomanawanui and running back Shane Vereen on the line next to them. This confused the Baltimore defense as to which players were eligible receivers — though they did announce it to officials as required — aiding the Patriots on a 9-play, 80-yard touchdown drive in which the team never faced a third down. This infuriated Ravens head coach John Harbaugh enough that he stormed onto the field to argue with officials, earning his team a penalty for unsportsmanlike conduct. Shortly after, Brady threw a 5-yard touchdown pass to Gronkowski, cutting the score to 28–21. After a Baltimore punt, Brady tossed a lateral pass across the field to receiver Julian Edelman, who promptly threw a 51-yard touchdown pass to a wide-open Amendola, tying the game at 28 with under four minutes left in the third quarter. Then Patriots safety Devin McCourty gave his team a great chance to take the lead by intercepting a pass from Flacco on the Ravens' 37-yard line. It was Flacco's first postseason interception in his last 197 postseason pass attempts ending the second longest streak of passes without an interception by a quarterback in postseason history. However New England was unable to move the ball and punted rather than try a long field goal attempt.

Early in the fourth quarter, Ravens kicker Justin Tucker finished a 16-play, 73-yard drive, which included Flacco's 11-yard completion to fullback Kyle Juszczyk on fourth and 1 from the Patriots' 36-yard line, with a 25-yard field goal, giving his team the lead at 31–28. Taking the ball back at their own 26-yard line, New England drove 74 yards in 10 plays for what turned out to be the game winning score. On the third play of the drive, Baltimore recovered a fumble from Vereen, only to see it overturned by replay review. Later, Brady converted the only third down on the drive, hitting Amendola with a 6-yard pass on third and 6. Finally with 5:13 left on the clock, he threw a 23-yard touchdown pass to receiver Brandon LaFell, giving New England their first and only lead of the game, 35–31. Baltimore responded with a drive to the New England 36-yard line, but with 1:37 left in the game, safety Duron Harmon intercepted Flacco's pass in the end zone. After the Ravens managed to force a punt with a few seconds left on the clock, Flacco threw a final Hail Mary pass to the end zone that was knocked down for an incompletion.

After the game, Harbaugh complained about New England's unusual formation use on their third quarter touchdown drive. "It's not something that anybody has ever done before," Harbaugh said. "They're an illegal type of a thing and I'm sure that [the league will] make some adjustments and things like that. We wanted an opportunity to be able to identify who the eligible players were, because what they were doing was they would announce the eligible player and Tom would take it to the line right away and snap the ball before [we] even figured out who was lined up where. And that was the deception part of it. It was clearly deception." "Maybe those guys gotta study the rule book and figure it out," Brady countered in response. "We obviously knew what we were doing and we made some pretty important plays. It was a real good weapon for us. Maybe we'll have something in store next week." The NFL sided with New England, finding that their methods were legal. In the ensuing offseason, in response to these tactics taken by the Patriots, the league passed a new rule requiring all ineligible receivers, including any offensive player with an eligible number that declares himself ineligible, to line up inside the tackle box prior to the snap.

Flacco finished the game 28-for-45 for 292 yards and a postseason career high four touchdowns, with two interceptions - his first multi interception postseason game in his last nine postseason games. Flacco's postseason record also fell to 1-5 when he throws at least one interception while it remained a perfect 9-0 when he does not throw an interception. Forsett rushed for 129 yards, while also catching two passes for 17 yards and a score. Gronkowski was the top receiver of the game with seven receptions for 108 yards and a touchdown.

Brady and Patriots head coach Bill Belichick set numerous NFL and franchise playoff records in the game. Brady became the NFL's career postseason leader in passing yards and touchdown passes (46), surpassing Joe Montana on his final touchdown pass of the game. He set a franchise record for completions in a postseason game (33), while also tying a franchise playoff record for career rushing touchdowns (5). This was Belichick's 20th postseason win, tying the all-time record held by Tom Landry. This was also the first time in playoff history that a team had come back from two 14-point deficits to win a game.

This was the fourth postseason meeting between the Ravens and Patriots. Baltimore won two of the three prior meetings that all took place at Gillette Stadium, including winning the last meeting 28–13 in the 2012 AFC Championship Game.

==== NFC: Seattle Seahawks 31, Carolina Panthers 17 ====
Carolina Panthers vs. Seattle Seahawks – Game summary

Quarter	1	2	3	4	Total
Panthers	0	10	0	7	17
Seahawks	7	7	0	17	31

at CenturyLink Field, Seattle, Washington

- Date: January 10
- Game time: 8:15 p.m. EST/5:15 p.m. PST
- Game weather: 48 °F (9 °C), cloudy
- Game attendance: 68,524
- Referee: Terry McAulay
- TV announcers (Fox): Kevin Burkhardt (play-by-play), John Lynch (color commentator), and Pam Oliver (sideline reporter)
- Recap, Gamebook

Game information

1st Quarter

- SEA – Doug Baldwin 16-yard pass from Russell Wilson (Steven Hauschka kick), 0:56. Seahawks 7–0. Drive: 4 plays, 28 yards, 1:26.

2nd Quarter

- CAR – Kelvin Benjamin 7-yard pass from Cam Newton (Graham Gano kick), 7:44. Tied 7–7. Drive: 14 plays, 79 yards, 8:12.
- SEA – Jermaine Kearse 63-yard pass from Russell Wilson (Steven Hauschka kick), 4:54. Seahawks 14–7. Drive: 5 plays, 77 yards, 2:50.
- CAR – Graham Gano 35-yard field goal, 0:00. Seahawks 14–10. Drive: 13 plays, 62 yards, 4:54.

3rd Quarter

- None.

4th Quarter

- SEA – Steven Hauschka 37-yard field goal, 14:55. Seahawks 17–10. Drive: 12 plays, 69 yards, 6:32.
- SEA – Luke Willson 25-yard pass from Russell Wilson (Steven Hauschka kick), 10:26. Seahawks 24–10. Drive: 6 plays, 58 yards, 2:27.
- SEA – Kam Chancellor 90-yard interception return (Steven Hauschka kick), 5:55. Seahawks 31–10.
- CAR – Kelvin Benjamin 15-yard pass from Cam Newton (Graham Gano kick), 2:34. Seahawks 31–17. Drive: 8 plays, 83 yards, 3:21.

Leading passers

- CAR – Cam Newton – 23/36, 246 yards, 2 TD, 2 INT
- SEA – Russell Wilson – 15/22, 268 yards, 3 TD

Leading rushers

- CAR – Jonathan Stewart – 13 rushes, 70 yards
- SEA – Marshawn Lynch – 14 rushes, 59 yards

Leading receivers

- CAR – Kelvin Benjamin – 7 rec, 75 yards, 2 TD
- SEA – Jermaine Kearse – 3 rec, 129 yards, TD

Russell Wilson threw three touchdowns and the Seahawks strong safety Kam Chancellor had a career game as Seattle defeated Carolina 31–17 to advance to their second consecutive NFC Championship Game.

After both teams opened with punts on their first two possessions, Seattle forced the first turnover of the game when Richard Sherman intercepted Cam Newton at the Seahawks' 38-yard line. Following another Seahawks punt, Carolina again turned the ball over when Newton fumbled the handoff on an option play and it was recovered by Seattle's Tony McDaniel at Carolina's 28-yard line. On the ensuing possession Seattle opened the scoring when Wilson connected with Doug Baldwin on a 16-yard touchdown pass. Carolina responded with a 14-play, 79-yard drive which consumed over eight minutes and ended with Newton's 7-yard touchdown pass to Kelvin Benjamin to tie the game at 7. Seattle then retook the lead when, on a third and 7 play, Wilson passed to Jermaine Kearse who made a one-handed catch and ran 63 yards for a touchdown, the longest touchdown reception in Seahawks playoff history. Carolina then mounted a 13-play drive into Seattle territory to close out the half. After driving to the Seattle 24-yard line, Earl Thomas appeared to intercept Newton at the 2-yard line, but the interception was overturned after a review. While attempting a 40-yard field goal, Graham Gano missed wide left but Kam Chancellor was called for running into the kicker. Gano then converted a 35-yard field goal as time expired with Seattle leading 14–10 at halftime.

On the first drive of the second half, Seattle got into Carolina territory before Wilson was sacked on third down by Mario Addison to force a punt. After a Carolina punt, Seattle mounted a 12-play, 69-yard drive which included a 25-yard Marshawn Lynch run and reached the Carolina 7-yard line but settled for a 37-yard Steven Hauschka field goal when Wilson was sacked by Thomas Davis. Seattle forced another Carolina punt, and on their next drive Wilson found Luke Willson for a 29-yard pass to the Carolina 25-yard line and then connected with Willson again for a 25-yard touchdown to take a 24–10 lead. Facing a third and 13 from their own 17-yard line, on Carolina's next drive, Newton converted with a 19-yard pass to Ed Dickson, then connected with Greg Olsen on a 31-yard pass to the Seattle 19-yard line. Newton, however, was then intercepted for a second time by Chancellor, who returned it 90 yards for a touchdown. Down by 21 points, Newton threw a 15-yard touchdown to Benjamin with 2:34 remaining to make the score 31–17, but Carolina was unable to recover the onside kick and Seattle ran out the clock for the victory.

Wilson finished as the leading passer, going 15-for-22 for 268 yards and three touchdowns. Kearse recorded 129 yards and a touchdown on three receptions. Benjamin led Carolina with seven receptions for 75 yards and two touchdowns. The win was Seattle's eighth consecutive home playoff win. Seattle also became the first defending Super Bowl champion to win a playoff game since the 2005 season.

This was the second postseason meeting between the Panthers and Seahawks. Seattle won the prior meeting 34–14 in the 2005 NFC Championship Game.

=== Sunday, January 11, 2015 ===
==== NFC: Green Bay Packers 26, Dallas Cowboys 21 ====
Dallas Cowboys vs. Green Bay Packers – Game summary

Quarter	1	2	3	4	Total
Cowboys	7	7	7	0	21
Packers	7	3	10	6	26

at Lambeau Field, Green Bay, Wisconsin

- Date: January 11
- Game time: 1:05 p.m. EST/12:05 p.m. CST/10:05 a.m. PST
- Game weather: 24 °F (−4 °C), cloudy
- Game attendance: 79,704
- Referee: Gene Steratore
- TV announcers (Fox): Joe Buck (play-by-play), Troy Aikman (color commentator), Erin Andrews, and Chris Myers (sideline reporters)
- Recap, Gamebook

Game information

1st quarter

- GB – Andrew Quarless 4-yard pass from Aaron Rodgers (Mason Crosby kick), 8:30. Packers 7–0. Drive: 10 plays, 60 yards, 4:22.
- DAL – Tyler Clutts 1-yard pass from Tony Romo (Dan Bailey kick), 1:05. Tied 7–7. Drive: 12 plays, 62 yards, 7:25.

2nd quarter

- DAL – Terrance Williams 38-yard pass from Tony Romo (Dan Bailey kick), 8:19. Cowboys 14–7. Drive: 5 plays, 64 yards, 2:53.
- GB – Mason Crosby 40-yard field goal, 0:00. Cowboys 14–10. Drive: 5 plays, 38 yards, 0:29.

3rd quarter

- GB – Mason Crosby 30-yard field goal, 7:46. Cowboys 14–13. Drive: 6 plays, 32 yards, 3:18.
- DAL – DeMarco Murray 1-yard run (Dan Bailey kick), 4:12. Cowboys 21–13. Drive: 6 plays, 80 yards, 3:34.
- GB – Davante Adams 46-yard pass from Aaron Rodgers (Mason Crosby kick), 1:41. Cowboys 21–20. Drive: 7 plays, 90 yards, 2:31.

4th quarter

- GB – Richard Rodgers 13-yard pass from Aaron Rodgers (pass failed), 9:10. Packers 26–21. Drive: 8 plays, 8 yards, 4:19.

Leading passers

- DAL – Tony Romo – 15/19, 191 yards, 2 TD
- GB – Aaron Rodgers – 24/35, 316 yards, 3 TD

Leading rushers

- DAL – DeMarco Murray – 25 rushes, 123 yards, TD
- GB – Eddie Lacy – 19 rushes, 101 yards

Leading receivers

- DAL – Jason Witten – 6 rec, 71 yards
- GB – Davante Adams – 7 rec, 117 yards, TD

In the first playoff game between these teams in Green Bay since the 1967 NFL Championship Game, Aaron Rodgers threw two second half touchdowns as the Packers overcame an 8-point deficit to defeat the Cowboys 26–21.

After a Dallas punt on their opening possession, Green Bay mounted a 10-play drive which featured 45 rushing yards from Eddie Lacy and ended when Rodgers threw a 4-yard touchdown pass to Andrew Quarless. Dallas responded with their own 12-play drive which was prolonged with a Brad Jones holding penalty on third down. After a Tramon Williams pass interference call put the ball on the Green Bay 1-yard line, Tony Romo connected with Tyler Clutts for a touchdown. On their next drive Green Bay drove to the Dallas 27-yard line before Rodgers was strip-sacked by Jeremy Mincey, who recovered the fumble for Dallas. Five plays later Romo threw a 38-yard touchdown pass to Terrance Williams to give Dallas a 14–7 lead. After forcing a Green Bay punt - Green Bay's first punt at home in the first half in five games - Dallas drove to the Green Bay 33-yard line before Romo connected with Jason Witten on second and 7 for what appeared to be a first down. Upon review, however, the ball was spotted one-yard short and Dallas failed to convert the third down to force a field goal. Dan Bailey's 50-yard attempt, however, was blocked by Datone Jones and missed wide right. On a second and 20 on their next drive Rodgers converted with a 31-yard pass to Randall Cobb, and Mason Crosby hit a 40-yard field goal as time expired to cut Green Bay's deficit to 14–10 at halftime.

Green Bay was forced to punt on the opening drive of the second half, but on Dallas' ensuing possession Julius Peppers forced a fumble by DeMarco Murray which was recovered by Jones at the Dallas 44-yard line. Lacy then ran for 29 yards to the 16-yard line before Rodgers hit Davante Adams to get inside the 10-yard line. T. J. Lang, however, was called for unnecessary roughness and Green Bay was unable to convert a third and 16 and settled for a Crosby 30-yard field goal. Romo then threw a 20-yard pass to Dez Bryant and a 15-yard pass to Witten before Murray rushed for 26 yards to the Green Bay 1-yard line and scored a touchdown on the next play to make the score 21–13. On Green Bay's ensuing drive Rodgers converted a third down with a 16-yard pass to Adams, hit Cobb for a 26-yard gain, then on third and 15 connected with Adams for a 46-yard touchdown to get within one entering the fourth quarter. After a Dallas punt, Rodgers completed seven consecutive passes including a 13-yard touchdown to Richard Rodgers. The two-point conversion attempt, however, was unsuccessful, and Green Bay led 26–21 with 9:10 remaining. Driving into Green Bay territory, Romo completed a 9-yard pass to Cole Beasley to set up a fourth and 2 from Green Bay's 32-yard line. The Cowboys attempted a pass play on fourth and 2 to Bryant, which was initially ruled a completion. However, Packers head coach Mike McCarthy challenged the ruling on the field, initiating an instant replay review of the call by referee Gene Steratore and other officials. After the play was reviewed, the ruling was changed to an incomplete pass because Bryant did not maintain control of the ball after it hit the ground. This was a very controversial call. In March 2018, the NFL created a new rule under which this would have been a catch. Three years later the NFL announced that in fact Bryant completed the catch. "According to New York Giants owner and NFL competition committee member, John Mara, the league reached a unanimous agreement that it should be ruled a completion in the future. They've also acknowledged that it's time to create a clear definition of what a catch is to prevent further confusion."

Rodgers finished 24-for-35 for 316 yards and three touchdowns with no interceptions, ensuring that he would end the season without throwing an interception at home and that he would be 9–0 at home during the season. He finished the game going 9-for-9 in the fourth quarter, the most attempts without an incompletion in the fourth quarter of a playoff game in 25 years. Murray was the leading rusher with 123 yards and a touchdown on 25 carries, while Lacy had 101 yards on 19 attempts. Adams and Cobb both had over 100 yards receiving for Green Bay, with Adams catching seven passes for 117 yards and a touchdown and Cobb having eight receptions for 116 yards.

This was the sixth postseason meeting between the Cowboys and Packers. Dallas previously won four of the prior six matchups, which includes victories in three consecutive postseasons capped off by winning 38–27 in the 1995 NFC Championship Game.

==== AFC: Indianapolis Colts 24, Denver Broncos 13 ====
Indianapolis Colts vs. Denver Broncos – Game summary

Quarter	1	2	3	4	Total
Colts	0	14	7	3	24
Broncos	7	3	0	3	13

at Sports Authority Field at Mile High, Denver, Colorado

- Date: January 11
- Game time: 4:40 p.m. EST/2:40 p.m. MST/1:40 p.m. PST
- Game weather: 40 °F (4 °C), cloudy
- Game attendance: 76,867
- Referee: Bill Leavy
- TV announcers (CBS): Jim Nantz (play-by-play), Phil Simms (color commentator), and Tracy Wolfson (sideline reporter)
- Recap, Gamebook

Game information

1st quarter

- DEN – Demaryius Thomas 1-yard pass from Peyton Manning (Connor Barth kick), 10:00. Broncos 7–0. Drive: 7 plays, 68 yards, 3:37.

2nd quarter

- IND – Dan Herron 6-yard run (Adam Vinatieri kick), 14:14. Tied 7–7. Drive: 9 plays, 73 yards, 5:05.
- IND – Dwayne Allen 3-yard pass from Andrew Luck (Adam Vinatieri kick), 7:23. Colts 14–7. Drive: 8 plays, 41 yards, 3:41.
- DEN – Connor Barth 45-yard field goal, 0:02. Colts 14–10. Drive: 7 plays, 25 yards, 1:26.

3rd quarter

- IND – Hakeem Nicks 15-yard pass from Andrew Luck (Adam Vinatieri kick), 8:21. Colts 21–10. Drive: 11 plays, 72 yards, 5:16.

4th quarter

- DEN – Connor Barth 41-yard field goal, 13:50. Colts 21–13. Drive: 14 plays, 53 yards, 6:23.
- IND – Adam Vinatieri 30-yard field goal, 4:06. Colts 24–13. Drive: 13 plays, 54 yards, 8:14.

Leading passers

- IND – Andrew Luck – 27/43, 265 yards, 2 TD, 2 INT
- DEN – Peyton Manning – 26/46, 211 yards, TD

Leading rushers

- IND – Dan Herron – 23 rushes, 63 yards, TD
- DEN – C. J. Anderson – 18 rushes, 80 yards

Leading receivers

- IND – T. Y. Hilton – 4 rec, 72 yards
- DEN – Demaryius Thomas – 5 rec, 59 yards, TD

The Colts held the Broncos, who finished the season with the NFL's second-highest scoring offense, to 288 total yards and just two field goals in the final 55 minutes and prevailed 24–13 to advance to their first AFC Championship Game since the 2009 season. During the regular season, Denver averaged 35 points per game at home, and had finished 8–0.

After forcing an Indianapolis three-and-out on the opening possession, Denver advanced into Colts territory after an Arthur Jones roughing the passer penalty before Peyton Manning hit Julius Thomas for a 32-yard pass to the 1-yard line and then Demaryius Thomas for a 1-yard touchdown. Both teams then punted on their next possessions before Indianapolis drove to the Denver 6-yard line including 20- and 23-yard passes to T. Y. Hilton. The Colts capped off the drive with a Dan Herron 6-yard touchdown run at the beginning of the second quarter to tie the game. On Denver's next possession Manning was strip-sacked by Jonathan Newsome and the fumble was recovered by the Colts' Jerrell Freeman at the Denver 41-yard line. Indianapolis drove inside the 10-yard line after an Andrew Luck 22-yard pass to Donte Moncrief before Luck hit Dwayne Allen for a 3-yard touchdown to give the Colts a 14–7 advantage. After forcing a Denver punt, Indianapolis got inside Broncos territory again but came up empty when Adam Vinatieri missed a 44-yard field goal. On Indianapolis' next possession Luck was intercepted by Bradley Roby at the Denver 47-yard line. Manning then converted a third down with a 17-yard pass to Emmanuel Sanders before Connor Barth kicked a 45-yard field goal with two seconds left in the half to make the score 14–10 at halftime.

Denver opened the second half with a three-and-out before Indianapolis mounted an 11-play drive which included a 32-yard pass from Luck to Coby Fleener on third and 16. Luck then connected with Hakeem Nicks for a 15-yard touchdown to give Indianapolis a 21–10 lead. When Denver punted again on their next possession, Josh Cribbs was tackled by Omar Bolden and the fumble was recovered by Denver's Andre Caldwell. After review, however, Cribbs was ruled down by contact and Indianapolis retained possession. Luck threw his second interception to Rahim Moore, and Denver responded with a 14-play drive during which Manning went 7-for-9 for 38 yards and C. J. Anderson converted on fourth down with a 7-yard run but had to settle for a 41-yard Barth field goal to cut the deficit to eight points. Both teams then punted on their next possessions before Indianapolis went on a 13-play drive which consumed more than eight minutes and ended with a Vinatieri 30-yard field goal. Now down by 11 points with 4:06 remaining, Manning hit Wes Welker for a 20-yard completion but a fourth and 8 pass to Anderson came up one yard short of a first down. Denver was able to force an Indianapolis punt and take possession with 1:52 remaining, but got no further than the Colts' 23-yard line before time expired.

Luck went 27-for-43 for 265 yards with two touchdowns and two interceptions. He finished with 1,703 career postseason passing yards, the most by a quarterback in their first five postseason games. Manning finished 26-for-46 for 211 yards and a touchdown; he went just 7-for-18 (38.9%) in the first half, his lowest completion percentage in a first half of any game since 2007. Anderson was the leading rusher with 80 yards on 18 carries, while Hilton led all receivers with 72 yards on four receptions. The loss was Manning's ninth in his team's first playoff game, with no other quarterback having more than four such losses.

This was the third postseason meeting between the Colts and Broncos. Both prior meetings were won by the Peyton Manning-led Colts in consecutive postseasons, the more recent by a score of 49–24 in the 2004 AFC Wild Card playoffs.

== Conference championships ==
As per an annual rotation used by the NFL since 1997 and made official in 2002, the NFC Championship Game was the first game played on January 18 at 3:00 p.m. EST, followed by the AFC Championship Game at 6:50 p.m. EST.

=== Sunday, January 18, 2015 ===
==== NFC: Seattle Seahawks 28, Green Bay Packers 22 (OT) ====
Green Bay Packers vs. Seattle Seahawks – Game summary

Quarter	1	2	3	4	OT	Total
Packers	13	3	0	6	0	22
Seahawks	0	0	7	15	6	28

at CenturyLink Field, Seattle, Washington

- Date: January 18
- Game time: 3:05 p.m. EST/2:05 p.m. CST/12:05 p.m. PST
- Game weather: 52 °F (11 °C), rain, wind
- Game attendance: 68,538
- Referee: Tony Corrente
- TV announcers (Fox): Joe Buck (play-by-play), Troy Aikman (color commentator), Erin Andrews, and Chris Myers (sideline reporters)
- Recap, Gamebook

Game information

1st quarter

- GB – Mason Crosby 18-yard field goal, 8:07. Packers 3–0. Drive: 5 plays, 18 yards, 2:21.
- GB – Mason Crosby 19-yard field goal, 5:07. Packers 6–0. Drive: 6 plays, 22 yards, 2:54.
- GB – Randall Cobb 13-yard pass from Aaron Rodgers (Mason Crosby kick), 0:00. Packers 13–0. Drive: 7 plays, 56 yards, 3:39.

2nd quarter

- GB – Mason Crosby 40-yard field goal, 9:37. Packers 16–0. Drive: 6 plays, 11 yards, 3:41.

3rd quarter

- SEA – Garry Gilliam 19-yard pass from Jon Ryan (Steven Hauschka kick), 4:44. Packers 16–7. Drive: 11 plays, 78 yards, 6:09.

4th quarter

- GB – Mason Crosby 48-yard field goal, 10:53. Packers 19–7. Drive: 10 plays, 57 yards, 5:02.
- SEA – Russell Wilson 1-yard run (Steven Hauschka kick), 2:09. Packers 19–14. Drive: 7 plays, 69 yards, 1:43.
- SEA – Marshawn Lynch 24-yard run (Luke Willson–Russell Wilson pass), 1:25. Seahawks 22–19. Drive: 4 plays, 50 yards, 0:44.
- GB – Mason Crosby 48-yard field goal, 0:14. Tied 22–22. Drive: 7 plays, 48 yards, 1:11.

Overtime

- SEA – Jermaine Kearse 35-yard pass from Russell Wilson, 11:41. Seahawks 28–22. Drive: 6 plays, 87 yards, 3:19.

Leading passers

- GB – Aaron Rodgers – 19/34, 178 yards, TD, 2 INT
- SEA – Russell Wilson – 14/29, 209 yards, TD, 4 INT

Leading rushers

- GB – Eddie Lacy – 21 rushes, 73 yards
- SEA – Marshawn Lynch – 25 rushes, 157 yards, TD

Leading receivers

- GB – Jordy Nelson – 5 rec, 71 yards
- SEA – Doug Baldwin – 6 rec, 106 yards

Trailing 16–0 at halftime and 19–7 with under three minutes left in the game, Russell Wilson, despite throwing four interceptions, rallied his team to a tremendous comeback and won the game on a 35-yard touchdown pass to Jermaine Kearse in overtime, making the Seahawks the first team to get to consecutive Super Bowls since the 2004 New England Patriots, and the first NFC team to make consecutive Super Bowl appearances since the 1997 Green Bay Packers. Their sixteen-point halftime comeback was the largest ever in a conference championship game, besting the fifteen point halftime deficit by the Indianapolis Colts against the New England Patriots in 2006 (in which they had trailed 21–3).

Green Bay took the opening kickoff and drove to the Seattle 29-yard line, only to lose the ball when cornerback Richard Sherman made a leaping interception of an Aaron Rodgers pass in the end zone. However, Seattle fared no better, as Wilson was intercepted a few plays later by safety Ha Ha Clinton-Dix, who returned the ball 26 yards to the Seahawks' 4-yard line before a penalty pushed the team back to the 19-yard line. Green Bay managed to reach the Seattle 1-yard line, but they failed to break the goal line with consecutive running plays, forcing them to settle for Mason Crosby's 19-yard field goal. Then Packers linebacker Brad Jones forced a fumble from kick returner Doug Baldwin, which safety Morgan Burnett recovered on the Seahawks' 23-yard line. The Packers again drove to the 1-yard line, but had to settle for another Crosby field goal to go up 6–0. Following a Seahawks punt, Green Bay increased their lead to 13–0 with a 7-play, 56-yard drive that ended on Rodgers' 13-yard touchdown pass to Randall Cobb on the last play of the first quarter.

Early in the second quarter, Micah Hyde returned a punt 29 yards to the Seattle 33-yard line, setting up Crosby's third field goal that increased Green Bay's lead to 16–0, the only score of the quarter. On the first play after the ensuing kickoff, Clinton-Dix intercepted another pass from Wilson, giving Green Bay a first down on their 44-yard line. But a few plays later, Rodgers returned the favor by throwing a pass that was intercepted by Byron Maxwell. Seattle then drove to the Packers' 18-yard line, only to have Wilson throw an interception to Sam Shields in the end zone.

After an exchange of punts started the second half, Seattle finally got on the board with an 11-play, 78-yard drive, featuring a 29-yard completion from Wilson to Baldwin. Faced with fourth and 10 on the Packers' 19-yard line, the Seahawks made one of the most critical plays of the game. Head coach Pete Carroll sent the field goal unit onto the field, but ran a fake field goal play with punter Jon Ryan, previously utilized as the holder, taking the snap and running to the left. As he headed for the line of scrimmage, he managed to pull the entire Green Bay defense toward him, leaving rookie offensive tackle Garry Gilliam, who had checked in as an eligible receiver, wide open down the field. Ryan threw a pass just before reaching the line, which Gilliam hauled in for a touchdown, cutting the Seahawks' deficit to 16–7. Gilliam had played tight end for two years in college before converting to the tackle position, but in that time had never caught a touchdown pass, making this one his first.

Early in the fourth quarter, a 32-yard burst by Packers running back James Starks sparked a 57-yard drive that ended with Crosby's 48-yard field goal, putting Green Bay up 19–7. Green Bay seemed in control of the game now, especially when Wilson threw a pass that bounced out the hands of Kearse and was intercepted by Burnett, who, following the hand signals of teammate Julius Peppers motioning for him to go down, quickly slid to the turf after the interception giving Green Bay a first down at their own 43-yard line with just over 5 minutes left in the game. There appeared to be an open field for Burnett to make a substantial return, which would become a point of controversy post-game due to the contest's ensuing change of fates. Seattle made a crucial defensive stand after the turnover as the Packers attempted to run down the clock; three carries by Eddie Lacy resulted in a tackle by Kevin Williams for a 4-yard loss, a tackle by Michael Bennett for a 2-yard loss, and a 2-yard gain. Green Bay had forced Seattle to use two timeouts, but they punted the ball back after running just 1:12 off the clock. Taking the ball back on their 31-yard line with 3:52 left, Seattle running back Marshawn Lynch started the drive with a 14-yard run. Then Wilson hooked up with Baldwin for a 20-yard completion, and later connected with Lynch for a 26-yard gain. Two plays later, Wilson scored on a 1-yard touchdown run, trimming Green Bay's lead to 19–14.

With 2:09 and one timeout remaining, Seattle decided to attempt an onside kick. With a pending recovery by the Packers seemingly punching their ticket to the championship game, Steven Hauschka's kick went up in the air and straight to Packers tight end Brandon Bostick. Bostick, the Packers' third-string tight end, misplayed the Seahawks' attempt, stepping in front of all-pro receiver Jordy Nelson who was waiting for the ball, and ignoring his own blocking assignment in the process. The ball subsequently bounced into the air off of Bostick's helmet and facemask after going through his hands, and was recovered by Seahawks wide receiver Chris Matthews. From there it took Seattle just four plays to score on Lynch's 24-yard touchdown run with 1:25 remaining on the clock. On the subsequent 2-point conversion play, Wilson was flushed out of the pocket, forced to run backwards and to the right sideline. Just before being hit, he launched a high floating pass from the 17-yard line to the opposite side of the field. Tight end Luke Willson, who had not been assigned to do anything except block on the play, caught Wilson's pass at the 1-yard line and took the ball into the end zone to give the Seahawks a 22–19 lead. After the kickoff, Rodgers completed a pair of 15-yard passes to Cobb and Jordy Nelson. Then he scrambled 12 yards to the Seahawks' 36-yard line. Following two incompletions and a 6-yard toss to Nelson, Crosby kicked his fifth field goal of the day, tying the score at 22–22 with 14 seconds left on the clock and sending the game into overtime.

Seattle won the coin toss and started overtime backed up on their own 13-yard line. After driving to the 30-yard line, they found themselves facing third and 6. Wilson took the snap and fired a pass to Baldwin, who broke ahead of Casey Hayward on a streak pattern down the right sideline and hauled in the catch for a 35-yard gain to the Packers' 35-yard line. On the next play, Wilson launched a nearly identical pass to Jermaine Kearse, who was running straight down the middle of the field. Kearse was tightly covered by Tramon Williams, but managed to pull ahead of him just enough to make the catch for a 35-yard touchdown reception, sending Seattle to their third Super Bowl in franchise history. This was Kearse's only catch of the game. Prior to this, he had been targeted five times by Wilson, four of those five attempts had been intercepted.

Wilson finished the game 14-for-29 for 209 yards and a touchdown, with four interceptions, while also rushing for 25 yards and a touchdown. Baldwin was the top receiver of the game with six receptions for 106 yards, while also returning three kickoffs for 58 yards. Lynch had 25 carries for 157 yards and a touchdown, while also catching a 26-yard pass. Rodgers was 19-for-34 for 178 yards and a touchdown, with two interceptions. Lacy was the team's top rusher with 73 yards, while Nelson was their top receiver with five receptions for 71 yards. Burnett had 10 tackles - eight of which were solo tackles - two sacks, an interception, and a fumble recovery.

This was the third postseason meeting between the Packers and Seahawks. Green Bay won both prior meetings, the most recent by a score of 42–20 in the 2007 NFC Divisional playoffs.

This was the last NFC Championship appearance for the Seahawks until the 2025-26 playoffs.

==== AFC: New England Patriots 45, Indianapolis Colts 7 ====
Indianapolis Colts vs. New England Patriots – Game summary

Quarter	1	2	3	4	Total
Colts	0	7	0	0	7
Patriots	14	3	21	7	45

at Gillette Stadium, Foxborough, Massachusetts

- Date: January 18
- Game time: 6:50 p.m. EST/3:50 p.m. PST
- Game weather: 51 °F (11 °C), rain
- Game attendance: 68,756
- Referee: Walt Anderson
- TV announcers (CBS): Jim Nantz (play-by-play), Phil Simms (color commentator), and Tracy Wolfson (sideline reporter)
- Recap, Gamebook

Game information

1st quarter

- NE – LeGarrette Blount 1-yard run (Stephen Gostkowski kick), 10:15. Patriots 7–0. Drive: 6 plays, 26 yards, 2:12.
- NE – James Develin 1-yard pass from Tom Brady (Stephen Gostkowski kick), 1:20. Patriots 14–0. Drive: 8 plays, 59 yards, 3:30.

2nd quarter

- IND – Zurlon Tipton 1-yard run (Adam Vinatieri kick), 4:54. Patriots 14–7. Drive: 10 plays, 93 yards, 4:17.
- NE – Stephen Gostkowski 21-yard field goal, 0:09. Patriots 17–7. Drive: 15 plays, 65 yards, 4:45.

3rd quarter

- NE – Nate Solder 16-yard pass from Tom Brady (Stephen Gostkowski kick), 10:03. Patriots 24–7. Drive: 9 plays, 87 yards, 4:57.
- NE – Rob Gronkowski 5-yard pass from Tom Brady (Stephen Gostkowski kick), 3:19. Patriots 31–7. Drive: 8 plays, 62 yards, 5:36.
- NE – LeGarrette Blount 13-yard run (Stephen Gostkowski kick), 2:08. Patriots 38–7. Drive: 1 play, 13 yards, 0:06.

4th quarter

- NE – LeGarrette Blount 2-yard run (Stephen Gostkowski kick), 10:05. Patriots 45–7. Drive: 11 plays, 40 yards, 6:10.

Leading passers

- IND – Andrew Luck – 12/33, 126 yards, 2 INT
- NE – Tom Brady – 23/35, 226 yards, 3 TD, INT

Leading rushers

- IND – Dan Herron – 10 rushes, 51 yards
- NE – LeGarrette Blount – 30 rushes, 148 yards, 3 TD

Leading receivers

- IND – T. Y. Hilton – 1 rec, 36 yards
- NE – Julian Edelman – 9 rec, 98 yards

New England blew out the Colts, massively outgaining them in total yards (397 to 209), first downs (28 to 17), and time of possession (37:49 to 22:11), while also forcing three turnovers and scoring touchdowns on their first four drives of the second half. This was the most lopsided AFC Championship Game victory since the Buffalo Bills defeated the Los Angeles Raiders 51–3 in the 1990 season.

Both teams had to punt on their first drive, but Colts returner Josh Cribbs muffed the kick and Patriots linebacker Darius Fleming recovered the ball on the Indianapolis 26-yard line. Five plays later, LeGarrette Blount scored on a 1-yard touchdown run to put the Patriots up 7–0. The Colts responded with a drive to the New England 33-yard line, but the drive stalled there and Adam Vinatieri missed a 51-yard field goal attempt. New England took over on their 41-yard line, and mounted an 8-play, 59-yard drive, including Tom Brady's 30-yard completion to running back Shane Vereen, to score on Brady's 1-yard pass to fullback James Develin.

In the second quarter, New England threatened to score again with a drive to the Colts' 26-yard line, but this time they came up empty when Brady threw a pass that was intercepted by linebacker D'Qwell Jackson. Andrew Luck then led the Colts 93 yards in 10 plays, featuring a 36-yard completion to T. Y. Hilton on the right sideline, on a drive that ended with a 1-yard touchdown run by Zurlon Tipton, cutting their deficit to 14–7. New England responded with a 15-play drive to score on Stephen Gostkowski's 21-yard field goal, putting them up 17–7 with nine seconds left in the half.

In the second half, New England completely dominated the game. On their opening drive, Brady completed a 23-yard pass to receiver Julian Edelman and Blount ripped off a 22-yard run as the team drove 87 yards to score on Brady's 16-yard touchdown pass to tackle Nate Solder, who had checked in as an eligible receiver for a third and 1 situation. After forcing the Colts to punt, Brady completed a 22-yard pass to Edelman, and eventually finished the drive with a 5-yard touchdown toss to tight end Rob Gronkowski. On the Colts' next drive, Luck was intercepted by cornerback Darrelle Revis, who returned the ball 30 yards to the Colts' 13-yard line, and Blount ran the ball into the end zone on the next play. Indianapolis had to punt on their next possession, and Edelman returned the ball 45 yards to the Colts' 45-yard line, setting up Blount's 2-yard touchdown run with 10:05 left in the game. The Colts' final three drives after this would result in an interception by Patriots linebacker Jamie Collins, a punt, and time expiring in the game.

Brady threw for 226 yards and three touchdowns, with an interception, while Blount rushed for 148 yards and three touchdowns. Edelman was the top receiver of the game with nine receptions for 98 yards, a 12-yard carry, and returned three punts for 71 yards. Luck finished the game 12-for-33 for 126 yards.

This game marked another round of milestones for several members of the Patriots. Brady surpassed John Elway for the most Super Bowl appearances ever by a quarterback (6), and tied Mike Lodish for the most by any player. New England coach Bill Belichick tied Don Shula for the most Super Bowls ever reached (6) and set a new record for most postseason wins (21). Blount set new franchise playoff records for carries in a game (30) and career rushing touchdowns (7). For the Colts, Vinatieri set a new NFL record for most postseason games played (30), surpassing the old record of 29 set by Jerry Rice.

After the game, claims emerged that the Patriots had used under-inflated footballs. The results of the NFL's investigation, and possible sanctions against the Patriots, concluded with Brady's four-game suspension and the Patriots forfeiting their first and fourth round draft picks in the 2016 and 2017 NFL Drafts, respectively.

This was the fifth postseason meeting between the Colts and Patriots, and meeting for the second consecutive year. The home had won the previous four meetings, of which New England has won three of the prior four, including 43–22 in the 2013 AFC Divisional playoffs.

== Super Bowl XLIX: New England Patriots 28, Seattle Seahawks 24 ==
Super Bowl XLIX – New England Patriots vs. Seattle Seahawks – Game summary

Quarter	1	2	3	4	Total
Patriots	0	14	0	14	28
Seahawks	0	14	10	0	24

at University of Phoenix Stadium, Glendale, Arizona

- Date: February 1
- Game time: 6:30 p.m. EST/4:30 p.m. MST/3:30 p.m. PST
- Game weather: 66 °F (19 °C), sunny (retractable roof open)
- Game attendance: 70,288
- Referee: Bill Vinovich
- TV announcers (NBC): Al Michaels (play-by-play), Cris Collinsworth (color commentator), and Michele Tafoya (sideline reporter)
- Recap, Gamebook

Game information

1st quarter

- None.

2nd quarter

- NE – Brandon LaFell 11-yard pass from Tom Brady (Stephen Gostkowski kick), 9:47. Patriots 7–0. Drive: 9 plays, 65 yards, 4:10.
- SEA – Marshawn Lynch 3-yard run (Steven Hauschka kick), 2:16. Tied 7–7. Drive: 8 plays, 70 yards, 4:51.
- NE – Rob Gronkowski 22-yard pass from Tom Brady (Stephen Gostkowski kick), 0:31. Patriots 14–7. Drive: 8 plays, 80 yards, 1:45.
- SEA – Chris Matthews 11-yard pass from Russell Wilson (Steven Hauschka kick), 0:02. Tied 14–14. Drive: 5 plays, 80 yards, 0:29.

3rd quarter

- SEA – Steven Hauschka 27-yard field goal, 11:09. Seahawks 17–14. Drive: 7 plays, 72 yards, 3:51.
- SEA – Doug Baldwin 3-yard pass from Russell Wilson (Steven Hauschka kick), 4:54. Seahawks 24–14. Drive: 6 plays, 50 yards, 3:13.

4th quarter

- NE – Danny Amendola 4-yard pass from Tom Brady (Stephen Gostkowski kick), 7:55. Seahawks 24–21. Drive: 9 plays, 68 yards, 4:15.
- NE – Julian Edelman 3-yard pass from Tom Brady (Stephen Gostkowski kick), 2:02. Patriots 28–24. Drive: 10 plays, 64 yards, 4:50.

Top passers

- NE – Tom Brady – 37/50, 328 yards, 4 TD, 2 INT
- SEA – Russell Wilson – 12/21, 247 yards, 2 TD, INT

Top rushers

- NE – LeGarrette Blount – 14 carries, 40 yards
- SEA – Marshawn Lynch – 24 carries, 102 yards, TD

Top receivers

- NE – Julian Edelman – 9 receptions, 109 yards, TD
- SEA – Chris Matthews – 4 receptions, 109 yards, TD

This was the first Super Bowl meeting between the Patriots and Seahawks.

== Television coverage ==
Under the new U.S. television broadcast contracts that took effect starting this season, television network coverage was slightly altered. ESPN was given the rights to air one Wild Card game per postseason, marking the first time an NFL playoff game exclusively aired on a cable channel. This cable-only experiment lasted only this postseason, as ESPN was later given the right in subsequent years to simulcast its playoff games on sister broadcast network ABC. NBC's rights were also changed so that it would air one Wild Card game and one Divisional playoff game per postseason. CBS and Fox continued to air the rest of the AFC and NFC playoff games, respectively. NBC exclusively televised Super Bowl XLIX. All games were broadcast on Westwood One radio.
