= Chris Matthews (gridiron football) =

American gridiron football player (born 1989)

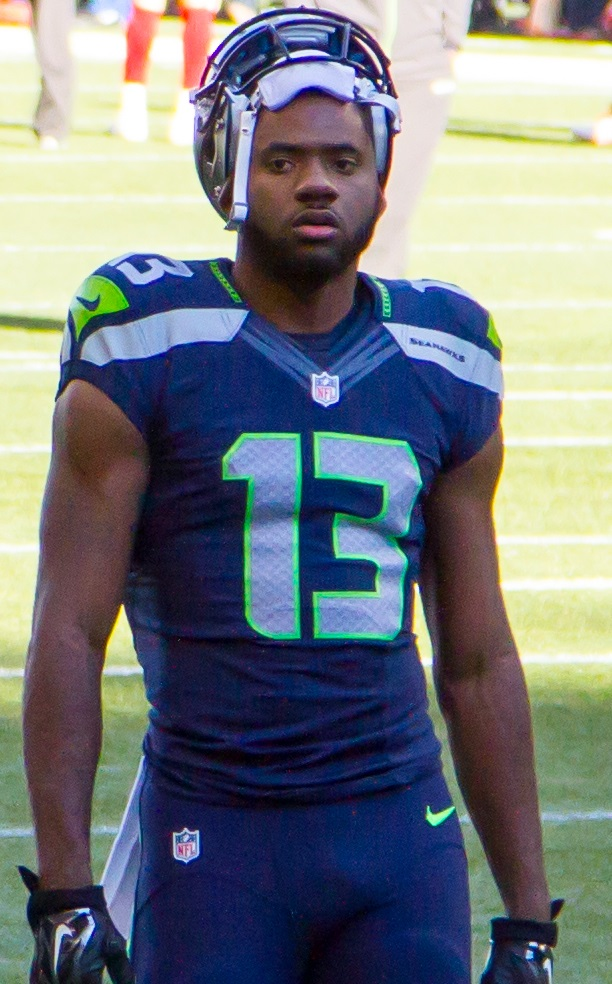
- Matthews with the Seattle Seahawks in 2014

No. 13, 19, 81, 84
- Position: Wide receiver

Personal information
- Born: October 6, 1989 (age 37); Long Beach, California, U.S.
- Listed height: 6 ft 5 in (1.96 m)
- Listed weight: 220 lb (100 kg)

Career information
- High school: Susan Miller Dorsey (Los Angeles, California)
- College: Los Angeles Harbor (2007–2008); Kentucky (2009–2010)
- NFL draft: 2011: undrafted

Career history
- Cleveland Browns (2011)*; Iowa Barnstormers (2012); Winnipeg Blue Bombers (2012–2013); Seattle Seahawks (2014–2015); Baltimore Ravens (2015–2017); Calgary Stampeders (2018); Winnipeg Blue Bombers (2019); Montreal Alouettes (2019)
- * Offseason or practice squad member only

Awards and highlights
- Grey Cup champion (2018); CFL's Most Outstanding Rookie Award (2012); Frank M. Gibson Trophy (2012)

Career NFL statistics
- Receptions: 16
- Receiving yards: 176
- Receiving touchdowns: 1
- Stats at Pro Football Reference

Career CFL statistics
- Receptions: 128
- Receiving yards: 1,901
- Receiving touchdowns: 13
- Stats at CFL.ca

Career AFL statistics
- Receptions: 36
- Receiving yards: 472
- Receiving touchdowns: 9
- Total tackles: 4
- Stats at ArenaFan.com

Christopher Douglas Matthews (born October 6, 1989) is an American former professional wide receiver. Matthews was undrafted out of college in 2011, and signed with the Cleveland Browns. He then played for the Winnipeg Blue Bombers for two seasons, winning the CFL's Most Outstanding Rookie Award in his first season. Matthews then signed with the Seattle Seahawks where he recovered a critical onside kick during the 2014 NFC Championship Game, and caught four passes for 109 yards and a touchdown in Super Bowl XLIX. Matthews played college football for Los Angeles Harbor College and the University of Kentucky.

== Early life and college ==
Matthews attended Susan Miller Dorsey High School in Los Angeles, California, and played American football for the school's team as a tight end and as a defensive end. He intended to enroll at the University of California, Los Angeles (UCLA) to play college football for the UCLA Bruins football team, but was academically ineligible to play for a school in Division I of the National Collegiate Athletic Association. He enrolled at Los Angeles Harbor College (LAHC), a junior college, to play football. At LAHC, Matthews became a wide receiver. During his sophomore season, Matthews caught 80 passes for 1,235 yards and 11 touchdowns in nine games.

In 2009, Matthews transferred to the University of Kentucky to play for the Kentucky Wildcats football team for his junior year, in 2009. That year, he caught 32 passes for 354 yards with three touchdowns. For the 2010 Wildcats team, Matthews caught 61 passes for 925 yards with nine touchdowns.

=== College statistics ===
| | | | Receiving | | |
| Year | Team | GP | Rec | Yards | TDs |
|---|---|---|---|---|---|
| 2009 | Kentucky | 13 | 32 | 354 | 3 |
| 2010 | Kentucky | 13 | 61 | 925 | 9 |
| Total | | 26 | 93 | 1,279 | 12 |

== Professional career ==
Pre-draft measurables
| Height | Weight | 40-yard dash | 10-yard split | 20-yard split | 20-yard shuttle | Three-cone drill | Vertical jump | Broad jump |
|---|---|---|---|---|---|---|---|---|
| 6 ft 4 7/8 in (1.95 m) | 218 lb (99 kg) | 4.57 s | 1.56 s | 2.59 s | 4.29 s | 6.90 s | 33.5 in (0.85 m) | 9 ft 10 in (3.00 m) |
All values from Kentucky Pro Day

=== Cleveland Browns ===
Matthews went undrafted in the 2011 NFL draft. The Cleveland Browns signed Matthews as an undrafted free agent. During the final cuts at the end of training camp, he was released.

=== Iowa Barnstormers ===
Matthews played for the Iowa Barnstormers of the Arena Football League (AFL) in 2012. He caught 36 passes for a total of 472 yards and nine touchdowns for the Barnstormers.

=== Winnipeg Blue Bombers (first stint) ===
Matthews signed with the Winnipeg Blue Bombers of the Canadian Football League (CFL) for the 2012 season. In his rookie year, he played in all 18 games of the regular season, and compiled 1,192 yards on 81 receptions with seven touchdowns en route to winning the 2012 CFL's Most Outstanding Rookie Award.

During the 2013 season, Matthews' performance was hampered by a serious turf toe injury which caused him to miss all but four games of the regular season. He finished the season with only 14 catches for 138 yards and one touchdown. Matthews was released by the Blue Bombers. In the offseason, he worked at Foot Locker and as a security guard.

=== Seattle Seahawks ===
While Matthews was working as a security guard, he received a phone call from a member of the Seattle Seahawks inviting him to try out for them that night. On February 18, 2014, Matthews signed with the Seahawks on a 2014 reserve/future contract. After four preseason games in which he caught four passes for 53 yards, Seattle released him on August 30, 2014. On August 31, 2014, it was announced that he had been signed to their practice squad. He was signed to the Seahawks' 53-man roster on December 6, 2014. He played in three regular season games for the Seahawks in the 2014 season, and did not catch a pass. He recorded a tackle on a special teams play.

In the 2014 NFC Championship Game versus the Green Bay Packers, Matthews recovered a critical onside kick, which gave the Seahawks an opportunity to score and eventually win the game in overtime. In Super Bowl XLIX against the New England Patriots, Matthews caught his first NFL career catch, a 44-yard pass from Russell Wilson. He then caught an 11-yard pass for his first NFL touchdown at the end of the first half, tying the game 14–14. Matthews finished the game with four catches for 109 yards, tied with the Patriots' Julian Edelman as the game's leading receiver, but the Patriots defeated the Seahawks 28–24. For his performance he received consideration for Super Bowl MVP honors which was ultimately won by Patriots quarterback Tom Brady. During the game, the value of Matthews's rookie card reportedly soared by 3,500%.

Matthews played in nine games for Seattle during the 2015 season, catching four passes for 54 yards on nine targets while also posting one solo tackle. He appeared in 134 snaps on offense and 98 snaps on special teams in 2015. On November 17, 2015, the Seahawks released Matthews. Seattle had given him the option of returning to the practice squad, but Matthews declined saying “I felt like I was too far ahead for that. I didn’t want to go back to that life.”

=== Baltimore Ravens ===
After being released by the Seahawks, Matthews was signed to the Baltimore Ravens practice squad on November 23, 2015. He was promoted to the active roster on December 12, 2015. He scored his only NFL career regular season touchdown on December 27, 2015, against the Pittsburgh Steelers. On April 7, 2016, Matthews signed his exclusive rights free agent tender to remain with the Ravens. On September 3, 2016, he was placed on injured reserve.

On September 2, 2017, Matthews was released by the Ravens, but was re-signed two days later. He was released again on November 3, 2017.

According to Sports Illustrated, Matthews was a "heartwarming story, a guy who’d gone from hiding in plain sight to the cusp of Super Bowl history to the unemployment line, in less than a calendar year".

=== Calgary Stampeders ===
On October 2, 2018, Matthews returned to the CFL when he signed with the Calgary Stampeders. With the Stampeders winning the Grey Cup, Matthews became a crucial pickup making 12 receptions for 252 yards in four remaining regular season games. In two playoff games, Matthews contributed seven catches for 98 yards en route to winning the Grey Cup.

=== Winnipeg Blue Bombers (second stint) ===
On May 10, 2019, the Blue Bombers announced they had signed Matthews to a three-year contract. He played in six games for the team, recording 12 receptions for 180 yards and a touchdown before being released on August 28, 2019.

=== Montreal Alouettes ===
Two days after being released by Winnipeg, Matthews signed with the Montreal Alouettes. Matthews played in five games in the second half of the season, and helped Montreal secure its first playoff berth since 2015, by catching nine passes for 139 yards and three touchdowns.

== Personal life ==
Matthews's father, Darell, is from Holly Springs, Mississippi. He played college football at Lane College, and is a member of the Los Angeles Police Department. Like his son, Darell also wore uniform number 13. He has a younger sister, Jada, who attends the University of Utah and plays college basketball for the Utah Utes women's basketball team.

Matthews is a cousin of Reggie White.
