= Tyler Clutts =

American football player (born 1984)

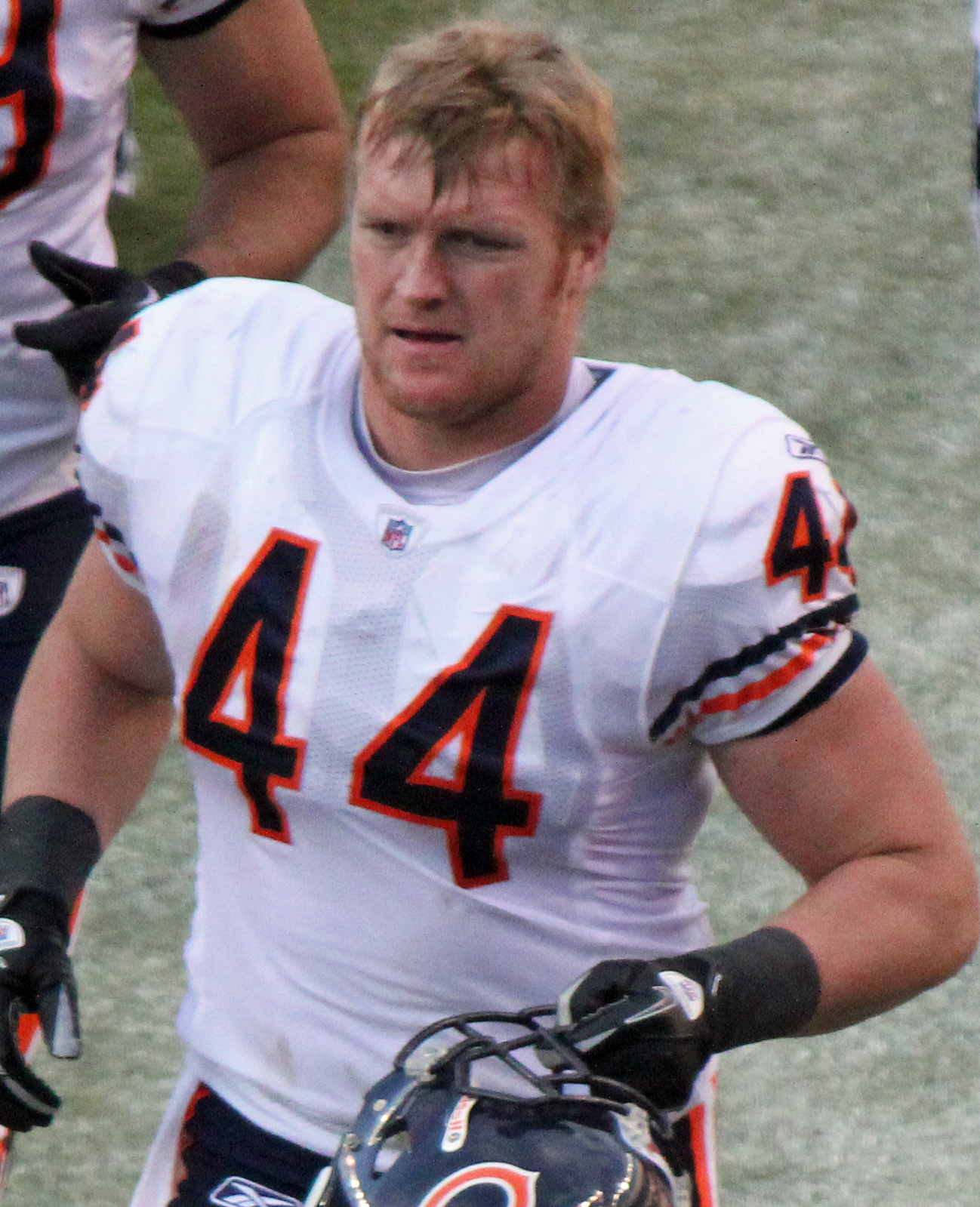
- Clutts with the Chicago Bears in 2011

No. 44, 40
- Position: Fullback

Personal information
- Born: November 9, 1984 (age 41); Vallejo, California, U.S.
- Listed height: 6 ft 2 in (1.88 m)
- Listed weight: 250 lb (113 kg)

Career information
- High school: Clovis (CA)
- College: Fresno State
- NFL draft: 2008: undrafted

Career history
- Edmonton Eskimos (2008); Utah Blaze (2010); Sacramento Mountain Lions (2010); Cleveland Browns (2010–2011)*; Chicago Bears (2011); Houston Texans (2012); Miami Dolphins (2013); Dallas Cowboys (2013–2015)
- * Offseason or practice squad member only

Awards and highlights
- All-WAC (2007); Second-team All-WAC (2006)

Career NFL statistics
- Games played: 72
- Receptions: 11
- Receiving yards: 57
- Receiving average: 5.2
- Stats at Pro Football Reference
- Stats at ArenaFan.com

Tyler Clutts (born November 9, 1984) is an American former professional football player who was a fullback in the National Football League (NFL) for the Cleveland Browns, Chicago Bears, Houston Texans, Miami Dolphins and Dallas Cowboys. He played college football for the Fresno State Bulldogs.

== Early life ==
Clutts attended Clovis High School, where he was a two-way player at quarterback and defensive end. As a senior, he registered 2,383 passing yards, 19 passing touchdowns and 16 rushing touchdowns. He led the team to an 11–2 record and the Yosemite Division Large School championship. He compiled a total of 2,383 passing yards, 19 passing touchdowns and 16 rushing touchdowns. He received The Fresno Bee's football player of the year and all-conference defensive end honors.

As a senior, he was the top-ranked wrestler in the state of California at 215 pounds.

== College career ==
Clutts accepted a football scholarship from Fresno State University, with the intention of playing the linebacker position. As a redshirt freshman, he was a backup linebacker and defensive end, appearing in all 12 games. He played mainly on special teams, collecting 19 defensive tackles (4 for loss) and 2 sacks.

As a sophomore, he started all 13 games at defensive end, posting 52 tackles (sixth on the team), 12 tackles for loss (second on the team), 7 sacks (tied for the team lead), 3 passes defensed and blocked an extra point attempt. He had 7 tackles and 2 sacks against the University of Nevada, Reno.

As a junior, he tallied 37 tackles (eighth on the team), 9 tackles for loss, 7 quarterback sacks (led the team), one forced one fumble and one interception. As a senior, he appeared in all 13 games, recording 64 tackles (fourth on the team), 9.5 tackles for loss (led the team), 7.5 sacks (led the team), 2 fumble recoveries and 3 passes defensed.

He finished his college career with 172 tackles (34.5 for loss), 23.5 sacks (tied for third in school history).

== Professional career ==
=== Edmonton Eskimos ===
After going undrafted in the 2008 NFL draft, Clutts signed with the Edmonton Eskimos of the Canadian Football League on May 8. He had 2 starts early in the season ahead of defensive end Brandon Guillory. He played in 18 games (2 starts), posting 22 tackles (2 for loss), 2 passes defensed, 16 special teams tackles, one fumble recovery and 6 kickoff returns for 37 yards. On May 8, 2009, he was released after the team changed coaching staffs.

=== Utah Blaze ===
In 2010, Clutts signed with the Utah Blaze of the Arena Football League. He was a two-way player at fullback and middle linebacker. He also was the team long snapper.

=== Sacramento Mountain Lions ===
In 2010, he signed with the Sacramento Mountain Lions of the UFL for a year, where he officially made the switch to fullback from defensive end. He became the starter after Jon Abbate announced his retirement.

=== Cleveland Browns ===
On December 21, 2010, he was signed to the Cleveland Browns practice squad, where he spent the last 2 weeks of the season. On January 5, 2011, he was signed to a future contract. On September 3, he was released after not being able to pass rookie Owen Marecic on the depth chart. On September 4, he was signed to the practice squad.

=== Chicago Bears ===
In 2011, during the preseason finale against the Chicago Bears, Clutts attracted interest from Bears special teams coordinator Dave Toub, who felt that Clutts would be a decent addition to the team. On September 7, he was signed by the Bears from the Cleveland Brown's practice squad to a three-year deal. He appeared in 16 games with eight starts.

When long snapper Patrick Mannelly went down with an injury against the San Diego Chargers, Clutts filled in his role until the arrival of Chris Massey. Clutts was also in the running for the fullback spot on the NFC team for the 2012 Pro Bowl, but did not make it. He contributed to running back Matt Forte's Pro Bowl season.

=== Houston Texans ===
On August 31, 2012, Clutts was traded to the Houston Texans in exchange for CB Sherrick McManis. He was a reserve fullback behind James Casey and played on special teams. He appeared in all 16 games. He was released on August 31, 2013.

=== Miami Dolphins ===
On September 1, 2013, Clutts was claimed off waivers by the Miami Dolphins. He played in four games with the team but did not record any statistics. On October 1, he was released after the team experienced a series of injuries on the defensive unit.

=== Dallas Cowboys ===
In 2013, the Dallas Cowboys went through most of the season without a true fullback. On December 3, after Lance Dunbar was placed on the injured reserve list, Clutts was signed as a free agent, reuniting with his former Cleveland Browns running back coach Gary Brown. He played in four games with the Cowboys to end the 2013 regular season.

In 2014, he helped block for DeMarco Murray, who would become the NFL's leading rusher for the season. He appeared in all 16 games and started one in the regular season. In the Divisional Round 21–26 playoff loss against the Green Bay Packers, he scored his first career touchdown on a catch for one yard touchdown.

In 2015, after Clutts contract expired, the team signed free agent fullbacks Jed Collins and Ray Agnew for salary cap reasons. On May 18, Collins was released after just two months and Clutts was re-signed. With the departure in free agency of Murray, Clutts was used during the preseason for depth purposes as a running back. He made the team and helped block for Darren McFadden who rushed for 1,000 yards. He appeared in all 16 games and started five in the regular season. He was not re-signed at the end of the season.

== Personal life ==
Clutts is a Christian. Clutts is married to Tiffany Clutts. They have four children.
