= 2014 Green Bay Packers season =

NFL Green Bay Packers season

- Owner: Green Bay Packers, Inc. (360,760 stockholders)
- General manager: Ted Thompson
- Head coach: Mike McCarthy
- Offensive coordinator: Tom Clements
- Defensive coordinator: Dom Capers
- Home stadium: Lambeau Field

Results
- Record: 12–4
- Division place: 1st NFC North
- Playoffs: Won Divisional Playoffs (vs. Cowboys) 26–21; Lost NFC Championship (at Seahawks) 22–28 (OT)
- All-Pros: 4: QB Aaron Rodgers (1st team); FB John Kuhn (1st team); WR Jordy Nelson (2nd team); G Josh Sitton (2nd team)
- Pro Bowlers: 7: QB Aaron Rodgers; FB John Kuhn; WR Jordy Nelson; WR Randall Cobb; G Josh Sitton; OLB Clay Matthews III; CB Sam Shields

Uniform
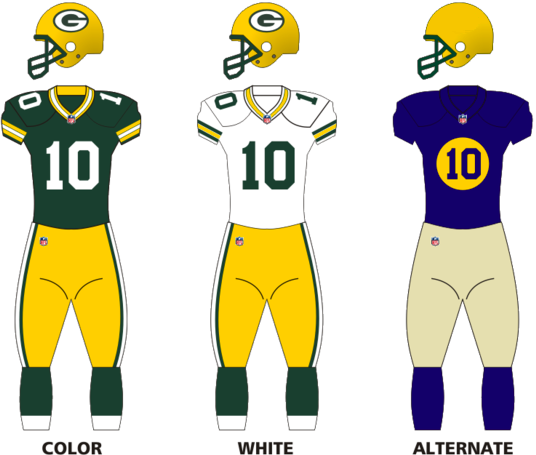

The 2014 season was the Green Bay Packers' 94th in the National Football League (NFL), their 96th overall and their ninth under head coach Mike McCarthy. The team tied with four other teams for a league-best 12 wins and 4 losses, while also adding a fourth consecutive NFC North division title. The club went undefeated at home for the first time since 2011. They also led the league in scoring, with 486 points, then the second-most in franchise history (currently third most). It marked the first time since the 2009 season that the team had a 4,000-yard passer, two 1,000-yard receivers and a 1,000-yard rusher.

In the playoffs, the Packers defeated the Dallas Cowboys in the divisional round, but then, in the NFC Championship game against the Seattle Seahawks, a rematch of the NFL season opener, despite holding a 16–0 lead at halftime, and a 19–7 lead in the dwindling minutes of the fourth quarter, the Packers would collapse, and would go on to lose the game 28–22 in overtime, ending their season. Quarterback Aaron Rodgers was named the league's Most Valuable Player.

The Packers made the playoffs for the sixth straight season, tying the record set between 1993 and 1998.

== Offseason ==
=== Free agents ===
Position	Player	Free agency tag	Date signed	2014 team
QB	Matt Flynn	UFA	April 15	Green Bay Packers
QB	Seneca Wallace	UFA		
RB	Kahlil Bell	UFA		
RB	James Starks	UFA	March 17	Green Bay Packers
FB	John Kuhn	UFA	April 3	Green Bay Packers
WR	James Jones	UFA	March 17	Oakland Raiders
TE	Jermichael Finley	UFA		
TE	Andrew Quarless	UFA	March 13	Green Bay Packers
C	Evan Dietrich-Smith	UFA	March 14	Tampa Bay Buccaneers
OT	Marshall Newhouse	UFA	March 21	Cincinnati Bengals
DE	Johnny Jolly	UFA		
DE	C. J. Wilson	UFA	March 28	Oakland Raiders
NT	Ryan Pickett	UFA	September 28*	Houston Texans
NT	B. J. Raji	UFA	March 14	Green Bay Packers
ILB	Robert Francois	UFA		
ILB	Jamari Lattimore	RFA	April 30	Green Bay Packers
OLB	Mike Neal	UFA	March 12	Green Bay Packers
CB	Sam Shields	UFA	March 8	Green Bay Packers
FS	Chris Banjo	ERFA	February 26	Green Bay Packers
FS	M. D. Jennings	RFA	March 12	Chicago Bears

RFA: Restricted free agent, UFA: Unrestricted free agent, ERFA: Exclusive rights free agent, FT: Franchise Tag
*Player was signed after the June 1st deadline and will not count towards compensatory selections.

=== Additions ===
Additions
Position	Player	Former team	Date	Ref
OT	Aaron Adams	Green Bay Packers*	January 7	
CB	Antonio Dennard	Green Bay Packers*	January 7	
C	Garth Gerhart	Green Bay Packers*	January 7	
WR	Alex Gillett	Green Bay Packers*	January 7	
RB	Orwin Smith	Green Bay Packers*	January 7	
OT	Jeremy Vujnovich	Green Bay Packers*	January 7	
OLB	Chase Thomas	Atlanta Falcons*	January 7	
FB	Ina Liaina	Miami Dolphins*	January 28	
TE	Raymond Webber	—N/a	February 13	
RB	Michael Hill	Tampa Bay Buccaneers	February 26	
OLB	Julius Peppers	Chicago Bears	March 15	
NT	Letroy Guion	Minnesota Vikings	March 17	
ILB	Korey Jones	Arizona Cardinals*	July 23	
WR	Gerrard Sheppard	Baltimore Ravens*	July 30	

*Offseason and/or practice squad member only.

=== Subtractions ===
Subtractions
Position	Player	2014 team	Release date
G	Greg Van Roten	Seattle Seahawks	February 12
WR	Sederrik Cunningham		April 11
RB	Orwin Smith		April 28
OLB	Chase Thomas	San Francisco 49ers	May 12
CB	James Nixon		May 14
TE	Raymond Webber	Miami Dolphins	May 19
ILB	Victor Aiyewa	San Diego Chargers	May 19
RB	Johnathan Franklin	Retired	June 20
ILB	Shaun Lewis		July 23

=== Draft ===
2014 Green Bay Packers draft
Round	Pick	Player	Position	College	Notes
1	21	Ha Ha Clinton-Dix *	Safety	Alabama	
2	53	Davante Adams *	Wide receiver	Fresno State	
3	85	Khyri Thornton	Defensive end	Southern Miss	
3	98	Richard Rodgers	Tight end	California	compensatory selection
4	121	Carl Bradford	Linebacker	Arizona State	
5	161	Corey Linsley *	Center	Ohio State	
5	176	Jared Abbrederis	Wide receiver	Wisconsin	compensatory selection
6	197	Demetri Goodson	Cornerback	Baylor	
7	236	Jeff Janis	Wide receiver	Saginaw Valley State	
Made roster † Pro Football Hall of Fame * Made at least one Pro Bowl during career

Notes

- The Packers were awarded two compensatory selections after losing free agents Greg Jennings and Erik Walden.
- Wide receiver Jared Abbrederis and defensive end Khyri Thornton sustained injuries prior the start of the season and were placed on injured reserve.

=== Undrafted free agent additions ===
2014 Green Bay Packers Undrafted Free Agents
Position	Player	College	Date
ILB	Jake Doughty	Utah State	May 12
OLB	Jayrone Elliott	Toledo	May 12
DE	Carlos Gray	North Carolina State	May 12
OLB	Adrian Hubbard	Alabama	May 12
G	Jordan McCray	Central Florida	May 12
RB	Rajion Neal	Tennessee	May 12
NT	Mike Pennel	Colorado State-Pueblo	May 12
TE	Justin Perillo	Maine	May 12
RB	LaDarius Perkins	Mississippi State	May 12
QB	Chase Rettig	Boston College	May 12
ILB	Joe Thomas	South Carolina State	May 12
CB	Ryan White	Auburn	May 12
OT	John Fullington	Washington State	May 14
S	Tanner Miller	Iowa	May 16
S	Charles Clay	Hawaii	May 19
TE	Colt Lyerla	Oregon	May 19
DE	Luther Robinson	Miami	May 19
ILB	Shaun Lewis	Oklahoma State	June 10

== Staff ==
2014 Green Bay Packers staff
Front office: Executive committee – Board of Directors; President/CEO – Mark Murphy; Executive vice president/general manager/director of football operations – Ted Thompson; Vice president of football administration/player finance – Russ Ball; Director of college scouting – Brian Gutekunst; Director of player personnel – Eliot Wolf; Assistant director of pro personnel – Tim Terry; Senior personnel executive – Alonzo Highsmith; Head coaches: Head coach – Mike McCarthy; Assistant head coach/linebackers – Winston Moss; Offensive coaches: Offensive coordinator – Tom Clements; Quarterbacks – Alex Van Pelt; Running backs – Sam Gash; Wide receivers – Edgar Bennett; Tight ends – Jerry Fontenot; Offensive line – James Campen; Assistant offensive line – Steve Marshall; Offensive quality control – Luke Getsy	Defensive coaches: Defensive coordinator – Dom Capers; Defensive line – Mike Trgovac; Assistant linebackers – Scott McCurley; Secondary (Cornerbacks) – Joe Whitt Jr.; Secondary (Safeties) – Darren Perry; Defensive quality control – John Rushing; Defensive/special teams assistant – Jason Simmons; Special teams coaches: Special teams coordinator – Shawn Slocum; Assistant special teams – Ron Zook; Strength and conditioning: Strength and conditioning coordinator – Mark Lovat; Strength and conditioning assistant – Chris Gizzi; Strength and conditioning assistant – Thadeus Jackson

== Final roster ==
2014 Green Bay Packers roster
Quarterbacks (QB): 10 Matt Flynn; 12 Aaron Rodgers; 16 Scott Tolzien; Running backs (RB): 26 DuJuan Harris; 30 John Kuhn FB; 27 Eddie Lacy; 44 James Starks; Wide receivers (WR): 17 Davante Adams; 11 Jarrett Boykin; 18 Randall Cobb; 83 Jeff Janis; 87 Jordy Nelson; Tight ends (TE): 86 Brandon Bostick; 80 Justin Perillo; 81 Andrew Quarless; 89 Richard Rodgers	Offensive linemen (OL): 69 David Bakhtiari LT; 75 Bryan Bulaga RT; 72 Garth Gerhart C; 70 T. J. Lang G; 63 Corey Linsley C; 71 Josh Sitton G; 65 Lane Taylor G; 73 JC Tretter C; Defensive linemen (DL): 93 Josh Boyd DE; 76 Mike Daniels DE; 99 Bruce Gaston DE; 98 Letroy Guion NT; 95 Datone Jones DE; 96 Mike Neal DE; 64 Mike Pennel NT	Linebackers (LB): 58 Sam Barrington ILB; 54 Carl Bradford OLB; 91 Jayrone Elliott OLB; 50 A. J. Hawk ILB; 59 Brad Jones ILB; 52 Clay Matthews ILB; 56 Julius Peppers OLB; 53 Nick Perry OLB; Defensive backs (DB): 32 Chris Banjo SS; 42 Morgan Burnett SS; 24 Jarrett Bush CB; 21 Ha Ha Clinton-Dix FS; 39 Demetri Goodson CB; 29 Casey Hayward CB; 31 Davon House CB; 33 Micah Hyde FS; 28 Sean Richardson SS; 37 Sam Shields CB; 38 Tramon Williams CB; Special teams (ST): 2 Mason Crosby K; 61 Brett Goode LS; 8 Tim Masthay P	Practice squad: 1 Alex Gillett WR; 20 Jean Fanor S; 40 Tay Glover-Wright CB; 49 Adrian Hubbard OLB; 34 Rajion Neal RB; 74 Justin Renfrow NT; 48 Joe Thomas ILB; 60 Jeremy Vujnovich G; 79 Josh Walker LT; 19 Myles White WR; Reserve: 84 Jared Abbrederis WR (IR); 77 Aaron Adams G (IR); 67 Don Barclay RT (IR); 13 Kevin Dorsey WR (IR); 57 Jamari Lattimore ILB (IR); 55 Andy Mulumba OLB (IR); 51 Nate Palmer OLB (IR); 90 B. J. Raji NT (IR); 97 Luther Robinson DE (IR); 94 Khyri Thornton DE (IR); Rookies in italics 53 active, 10 reserve, 10 practice squad

== Preseason ==
=== Preseason roster cuts ===
Position	Player	Date released	Notes
CB	Antonio Dennard	August 24	
S	Charles Clay	August 24	
WR	Chris Harper	August 24	
ILB	Korey Jones	August 24	
FB	Ina Liaina	August 24	
QB	Chase Rettig	August 24	
WR	Gerrard Sheppard	August 24	
TE	Colt Lyerla	August 26	Injury settlement
S	Chris Banjo	August 30	Practice squad
WR	Kevin Dorsey	August 30	Practice squad
ILB	Jake Doughty	August 30	
OT	John Fullington	August 30	
C	Garth Gerhart	August 30	Practice squad
WR	Alex Gillett	August 30	
DE	Carlos Gray	August 30	
RB	Michael Hill	August 30	Practice squad
OLB	Adrian Hubbard	August 30	Practice squad
G	Jordan McCray	August 30	
S	Tanner Miller	August 30	
RB	Rajion Neal	August 30	Injury settlement
TE	Justin Perillo	August 30	Practice squad
RB	LaDarius Perkins	August 30	
DE	Luther Robinson	August 30	Practice squad
CB	Jumal Rolle	August 30	Practice squad
ILB	Joe Thomas	August 30	Injury settlement
OG	Andrew Tiller	August 30	Injury settlement
OT	Jeremy Vujnovich	August 30	Practice squad
WR	Myles White	August 30	Practice squad
CB	Ryan White	August 30	

=== Injured Reserve ===
Position	Player	Date	Notes
TE	Colt Lyerla	August 21	waived/injured
WR	Jared Abbrederis	August 26	
OT	Don Barclay	August 26	
RB	Rajion Neal	August 26	waived/injured
NT	B. J. Raji	August 26	
ILB	Joe Thomas	August 26	waived/injured
OG	Andrew Tiller	August 26	waived/injured
OT	Aaron Adams	August 30	waived/injured
OLB	Nate Palmer	August 30	
TE	Jake Stoneburner	August 30	waived/injured
DE	Khyri Thornton	August 30	

=== Trades ===
Position	Player	Date traded	2014 team	Compensation
DE	Jerel Worthy	August 13	New England Patriots	undisclosed draft pick*

*Player failed to make the active roster. Draft pick compensation voided.

== Starters ==
=== Regular season ===
==== Offense ====
Offense
Pos	Name	GS	Name	GS	Name	GS
QB	Aaron Rodgers	16				
RB	Eddie Lacy	16				
FB	John Kuhn	2				
WR	Jordy Nelson	16				
WR	Randall Cobb	16				
WR	Davante Adams	9	Jarrett Boykin	3		
TE	Andrew Quarless	12	Richard Rodgers	5	Davante Adams	1
LT	David Bakhtiari	16				
LG	Josh Sitton	16				
C	Corey Linsley	16				
RG	T. J. Lang	16				
RT	Bryan Bulaga	15	Derek Sherrod	1		

==== Defense ====
POS	Name	GS	Name	GS	Name	GS	Name	GS
NT	Letroy Guion	16						
DE	Mike Daniels	16						
DE	Josh Boyd	4	Datone Jones	3	Mike Neal	1		
OLB	Clay Matthews III	11	Nick Perry	4	Mike Neal	2		
OLB	Julius Peppers	16						
ILB	A. J. Hawk	13						
ILB	Sam Barrington	7	Jamari Lattimore	5	Clay Matthews III	5	Brad Jones	1
CB	Tramon Williams	16	Davon House	4				
CB	Sam Shields	14	Micah Hyde	5	Casey Hayward	1		
SS	Morgan Burnett	15	Ha Ha Clinton-Dix	1				
FS	Ha Ha Clinton-Dix	9	Micah Hyde	7				

=== Postseason ===
==== Offense ====
POS	Name	GS
QB	Aaron Rodgers	2
RB	Eddie Lacy	2
FB	John Kuhn	2
WR	Jordy Nelson	2
WR	Randall Cobb	2
WR	Davante Adams	2
LT	David Bakhtiari	2
LG	Josh Sitton	2
C	Corey Linsley	2
RG	T. J. Lang	2
RT	Bryan Bulaga	2

==== Defense ====
POS	Name	GS	Name	GS
NT	Letroy Guion	2		
DE	Mike Daniels	2		
DE	Josh Boyd	1		
OLB	Clay Matthews III	2		
OLB	Julius Peppers	2		
ILB	A. J. Hawk	1	Nick Perry	1
ILB	Sam Barrington	2		
CB	Tramon Williams	2		
CB	Sam Shields	2	Micah Hyde	1
SS	Morgan Burnett	2		
FS	Ha Ha Clinton-Dix	2		

== Schedule ==
=== Preseason ===
Week	Date	Opponent	Result	Record	Game site	NFL.com recap
1	August 9	at Tennessee Titans	**L** 16–20	0–1	LP Field	Recap
2	August 16	at St. Louis Rams	**W** 21–7	1–1	Edward Jones Dome	Recap
3	August 22	Oakland Raiders	**W** 31–21	2–1	Lambeau Field	Recap
4	August 28	Kansas City Chiefs	**W** 34–14	3–1	Lambeau Field	Recap

=== Regular season ===
Week	Date	Opponent	Result	Record	Game site	NFL.com recap
1	September 4	at Seattle Seahawks	**L** 16–36	0–1	CenturyLink Field	Recap
2	September 14	New York Jets	**W** 31–24	1–1	Lambeau Field	Recap
3	September 21	at **Detroit Lions**	**L** 7–19	1–2	Ford Field	Recap
4	September 28	at **Chicago Bears**	**W** 38–17	2–2	Soldier Field	Recap
5	October 2	**Minnesota Vikings**	**W** 42–10	3–2	Lambeau Field	Recap
6	October 12	at Miami Dolphins	**W** 27–24	4–2	Sun Life Stadium	Recap
7	October 19	Carolina Panthers	**W** 38–17	5–2	Lambeau Field	Recap
8	October 26	at New Orleans Saints	**L** 23–44	5–3	Mercedes-Benz Superdome	Recap
9	Bye					
10	November 9	**Chicago Bears**	**W** 55–14	6–3	Lambeau Field	Recap
11	November 16	Philadelphia Eagles	**W** 53–20	7–3	Lambeau Field	Recap
12	November 23	at **Minnesota Vikings**	**W** 24–21	8–3	TCF Bank Stadium	Recap
13	November 30	New England Patriots	**W** 26–21	9–3	Lambeau Field	Recap
14	December 8	Atlanta Falcons	**W** 43–37	10–3	Lambeau Field	Recap
15	December 14	at Buffalo Bills	**L** 13–21	10–4	Ralph Wilson Stadium	Recap
16	December 21	at Tampa Bay Buccaneers	**W** 20–3	11–4	Raymond James Stadium	Recap
17	December 28	**Detroit Lions**	**W** 30–20	12–4	Lambeau Field	Recap

Note: Intra-division opponents are in bold text.

=== Postseason ===
Playoff round	Date	Opponent	Result	Record	Game site	NFL.com recap
Wild Card	First-round bye					
Divisional	January 11, 2015	Dallas Cowboys (3)	**W** 26–21	1–0	Lambeau Field	Recap
Conference	January 18, 2015	at Seattle Seahawks (1)	**L** 22–28 (OT)	1–1	CenturyLink Field	Recap

== Game summaries ==
=== Regular season ===
==== Week 1: at Seattle Seahawks ====
Week One: Green Bay Packers at Seattle Seahawks – Game summary

Quarter	1	2	3	4	Total
Packers	7	3	0	6	16
Seahawks	3	14	5	14	36

at CenturyLink Field, Seattle, Washington

- Date: September 4
- Game time: 7:30 p.m. CDT/5:30 p.m. PDT
- Game weather: 71 °F (22 °C), sunny
- Game attendance: 68,424
- Referee: John Parry
- TV announcers (NBC): Al Michaels, Cris Collinsworth and Michele Tafoya
- Recap, Gamebook

Game information

First quarter

- SEA – Steven Hauschka 35-yard field goal, 06:07 (SEA 3–0)
- GB – John Kuhn 2-yard run, Mason Crosby kick, 01:30 (GB 7–3)

Second quarter

- SEA – Ricardo Lockette 33-yard pass from Russell Wilson, Steven Hauschka kick, 13:08 (SEA 10–7)
- GB – Mason Crosby 23-yard field goal, 06:55 (TIE 10–10)
- SEA – Marshawn Lynch 9-yard run, Steven Hauschka kick, 03:46 (SEA 17–10)

Third quarter

- SEA – Steven Hauschka 20-yard field goal, 10:32 (SEA 20–10)
- SEA – Safety, Aaron Rodgers fumble recovered by Derek Sherrod, tackled by Tony McDaniel in endzone, 04:53 (SEA 22–10)

Fourth quarter

- SEA – Marshawn Lynch 3-yard run, Steven Hauschka kick, 15:00 (SEA 29–10)
- GB – Randall Cobb 3-yard pass from Aaron Rodgers, 09:37 (SEA 29–16)
- SEA – Derrick Coleman 15-yard pass from Russell Wilson, Steven Hauschka kick, 02:37 (SEA 36–16)

Top passers

- GB – Aaron Rodgers - 23/33, 189 Yds, 1 TD, 1 INT
- SEA – Russell Wilson - 19/28, 191 Yds, 2 TD

Top rushers

- GB – James Starks - 7 Car, 37 Yds
- SEA – Marshawn Lynch - 20 Car, 110 Yds, 2 TD

Top receivers

- GB – Jordy Nelson - 9 Rec, 83 Yds
- SEA – Percy Harvin - 7 Rec, 59 Yds

Top tacklers

- GB – Morgan Burnett - 5 Tackles, 3 Ast
- SEA – Bobby Wagner - 6 Tackles, 8 Ast

The Packers 2014 regular season started in the NFL Kickoff game against the defending Super Bowl XLVIII Champion Seattle Seahawks at CenturyLink Field. This marks the first competitive contest between the two teams since the Fail Mary Game. The Seahawks defense proved too strong for the Packers, as Green Bay fell to 0–1.

==== Week 2: vs. New York Jets ====
Week Two: New York Jets at Green Bay Packers – Game summary

Quarter	1	2	3	4	Total
Jets	14	7	3	0	24
Packers	3	13	15	0	31

at Lambeau Field, Green Bay, Wisconsin

- Date: September 14
- Game time: 3:25 p.m. CDT
- Game weather: 63 °F (17 °C), sunny
- Game attendance: 78,041
- Referee: Walt Anderson
- TV announcers (CBS): Greg Gumbel, Trent Green and Evan Washburn
- Recap, Gamebook

Game information

First quarter

- NYJ – Geno Smith 1-yard run, Nick Folk kick, 13:06 (NYJ 7–0)
- NYJ – Eric Decker 29-yard pass from Geno Smith, Nick Folk kick, 08:29 (NYJ 14–0)
- GB – Mason Crosby 31-yard field goal, 04:10 (NYJ 14–3)

Second quarter

- NYJ – Chris Ivory 4-yard run, Nick Folk kick, 10:38 (NYJ 21–3)
- GB – Mason Crosby 20-yard field goal, 05:46 (NYJ 21–6)
- GB – Mason Crosby 55-yard field goal, 03:17 (NYJ 21–9)
- GB – Randall Cobb 6-yard pass from Aaron Rodgers, Mason Crosby kick, 00:08 (NYJ 21–16)

Third quarter

- GB – Randall Cobb 1-yard pass from Aaron Rodgers, Randall Cobb pass from Aaron Rodgers for two-point conversion, 05:48 (GB 24–21)
- NYJ – Nick Folk 52-yard field goal, 02:26 (24–24)
- GB – Jordy Nelson 80-yard pass from Aaron Rodgers, Mason Crosby kick, 02:21 (GB 31–24)

Fourth quarter

- No scoring plays

Top passers

- NYJ – Geno Smith - 16/32, 176 Yds, 1 TD, 1 INT
- GB – Aaron Rodgers - 25/42, 346 Yds, 3 TDs

Top rushers

- NYJ – Chris Ivory - 13 Car, 43 Yds, 1 TD
- GB – Eddie Lacy - 13 Car, 43 Yds

Top receivers

- NYJ – Eric Decker - 4 Rec, 63 Yds, 1 TD
- GB – Jordy Nelson - 9 Rec, 209 Yds, 1 TD

Top tacklers

- NYJ – Demario Davis - 5 Tackles, 1 Ast, 2 Sacks
- GB – Morgan Burnett - 6 Tackles, 4 Ast

After being down 21–3 midway through the second quarter, the Packers rallied back to a five-point halftime deficit. An 80-yard TD by Jordy Nelson in the third quarter gave the Packers a lead they wouldn't relinquish. Late in the 4th quarter, the Jets had one last chance to tie the game. On 4th down, Jets quarterback Geno Smith seemed to have thrown a game-tying touchdown pass, but an official announced that the Jets had called for a timeout just before the ball was snapped. A confused Jets head coach, Rex Ryan, argued with the officials that he didn't call for a timeout. A look at the video replay showed that Jets offensive coordinator, Mary Mornhinwig, started running to Ryan, calling for a timeout. Even though the rules said that only the head coach could call for a timeout in that situation, the official simply heard a voice shouting for a timeout, and unable to look back to see who it was, since it was just before the ball was snapped, the official assumed that Ryan called for the timeout. While the Jets were able to convert the 4th down after the timeout, they were unable to move the ball any further, and turned the ball over on downs, at which point the Packers ran out the final 3:31 of the clock to get their first victory of the season.

==== Week 3: at Detroit Lions ====
Week Three: Green Bay Packers at Detroit Lions – Game summary

Quarter	1	2	3	4	Total
Packers	7	0	0	0	7
Lions	7	5	0	7	19

at Ford Field, Detroit, Michigan

- Date: September 21
- Game time: 1:00 p.m. EDT/12:00 p.m. CDT
- Game weather: Played indoors (dome stadium)
- Game attendance: 62,418
- Referee: Carl Cheffers
- TV announcers (Fox): Kevin Burkhardt, John Lynch and Pam Oliver
- Recap, Gamebook

Game information

First quarter

- DET – Don Carey 40-yard fumble return run, Nate Freese kick, 12:13 (DET 7–0)
- GB – Andrew Quarless 10-yard pass from Aaron Rodgers, Mason Crosby kick, 00:43 (7–7)

Second quarter

- DET – DeAndre Levy safety, 13:26 (DET 9–7)
- DET – Nate Freese 30-yard field goal, 06:21 (DET 12–7)

Third quarter Fourth quarter

- DET – Reggie Bush 26-yard run, Nate Freese kick, 10:47 (DET 19–7)

Top passers

- GB – Aaron Rodgers - 16/27, 162 Yds, 1 TD
- DET – Matthew Stafford - 22/34, 246 Yds, 2 INTs

Top rushers

- GB – James Starks - 8 Car, 38 Yds
- DET – Reggie Bush - 12 Car, 61Yds, 1 TD

Top receivers

- GB – Jordy Nelson - 5 Rec, 59 Yds
- DET – Calvin Johnson - 6 Rec, 82 Yds

Top tacklers

- GB – Jamari Lattimore - 7 Tackles, 2 Ast
- DET – DeAndre Levy - 9 Tackles, 1 Ast

For the third straight season, the Packers started off with a 1–2 record. The Lions' defense dominated the game as the Packers failed to score any points in the second, third, or fourth quarter. The Packers crossed midfield on only three drives, and they had only one such drive in the second half. The Packers' 7 points represented the lowest total that the team scored in a game that Rodgers finished. Rodgers' 162 passing yards was his lowest since the 2008 season.

==== Week 4: at Chicago Bears ====
Week Four: Green Bay Packers at Chicago Bears – Game summary

Quarter	1	2	3	4	Total
Packers	7	14	10	7	38
Bears	7	10	0	0	17

at Soldier Field, Chicago, Illinois

- Date: September 28
- Game time: 12:00 p.m. CDT
- Game weather: 70 °F (21 °C), partly cloudy
- Game attendance: 61,736
- Referee: Terry McAulay
- TV announcers (Fox): Kevin Burkhardt, John Lynch and Pam Oliver
- Recap, Gamebook

Game information

First quarter

- CHI – Brandon Marshall 6-yard pass from Jay Cutler, Robbie Gould kick, 06:35 (CHI 7–0)
- GB – Eddie Lacy 2-yard run, Mason Crosby kick, 04:16 (7–7)

Second quarter

- CHI – Robbie Gould 23-yard field goal, 14:02 (CHI 10–7)
- GB – Jordy Nelson 3-yard pass from Aaron Rodgers, Mason Crosby kick, 10:15 (GB 14–10)
- CHI – Alshon Jeffery 8-yard pass from Jay Cutler, Robbie Gould kick, 03:57 (CHI 17–14)
- GB – Randall Cobb 22-yard pass from Aaron Rodgers, Mason Crosby kick, 01:10 (GB 21–17)

Third quarter

- GB – Mason Crosby 53-yard field goal, 11:02 (GB 24–17)
- GB – Jordy Nelson 11-yard pass from Aaron Rodgers, Mason Crosby kick, 04:35 (GB 31–17)

Fourth quarter

- GB – Randall Cobb 3-yard pass from Aaron Rodgers, Mason Crosby kick, 15:00 (GB 38–17)

Top passers

- GB – Aaron Rodgers - 22/28, 302 Yds, 4 TDs
- CHI – Jay Cutler - 22/34, 256 Yds, 2 TDs, 2 INTs

Top rushers

- GB – Eddie Lacy - 17 Car, 48 Yds, 1 TD
- CHI – Matt Forté - 23 Car, 122 Yds

Top receivers

- GB – Randall Cobb - 7 Rec, 113 Yds, 2 TDs
- CHI – Martellus Bennett - 9 Rec, 134 Yds

Top tacklers

- GB – Morgan Burnett - 12 Tackles, 1 Ast
- CHI – Ryan Mundy - 8 Tackles

During the week prior to the Packers' crucial game against the rival 2–1 Bears, Aaron Rodgers addressed the concerns of many Packers fans, who felt that the season was already slipping away just three weeks in with a 1–2 record. In a radio interview, Rodgers said to the fans, "R-E-L-A-X. Relax." Rodgers was true to his word, completing 22 of 28 passes for 302 yards, 4 touchdown passes, 0 interceptions, and a passer rating of 151.2, making it the second game of his career where he had a passer rating of over 150. Two of his touchdown passes were to Randall Cobb as the Packers took advantage of two Jay Cutler interceptions, scoring 17 unanswered points in the second half in a 38–17 win, which was also the Packers' 700th regular season win in the NFL. This was only the second game in NFL history to not have a punt.

==== Week 5: vs. Minnesota Vikings ====
Week Five: Minnesota Vikings at Green Bay Packers – Game summary

Quarter	1	2	3	4	Total
Vikings	0	0	0	10	10
Packers	14	14	14	0	42

at Lambeau Field, Green Bay, Wisconsin

- Date: October 2
- Game time: 7:25 p.m. CDT
- Game weather: 63 °F (17 °C),(Rain)
- Game attendance: 78,054
- Referee: Brad Allen
- TV announcers (CBS/NFLN): Jim Nantz, Phil Simms and Tracy Wolfson
- Recap, Gamebook

Game information

First quarter

- GB – Randall Cobb 8-yard pass from Aaron Rodgers, Mason Crosby kick, 09:44 (GB 7–0)
- GB – Jordy Nelson 66-yard pass from Aaron Rodgers, Mason Crosby kick, 05:29 (GB 14–0)

Second quarter

- GB – Julius Peppers pass interception from Christian Ponder, 49-yards run, Mason Crosby kick, 07:06 (GB 21–0)
- GB – Davante Adams 11-yard pass from Aaron Rodgers, Mason Crosby kick, 04:55 (GB 28–0)

Third quarter

- GB – Eddie Lacy 11-yard run, Mason Crosby kick, 10:40 (GB 35–0)
- GB – Eddie Lacy 10-yard run, Mason Crosby kick, 03:49 (GB 42–0)

Fourth quarter

- MIN – Christian Ponder 6-yard run, Blair Walsh kick, 04:55 (GB 42–7)
- MIN – Blair Walsh 26-yard field goal, 10:11 (GB 42–10)

Top passers

- MIN – Christian Ponder - 22/44, 222 Yds, 2 Ints
- GB – Aaron Rodgers - 12/17, 156 Yds, 3 TDs

Top rushers

- MIN – Matt Asiata - 15 Car, 72 Yds
- GB – Eddie Lacy - 13 Car, 105 Yds, 2 TDs

Top receivers

- MIN – Adam Thielen - 4 Rec, 57 Yds
- GB – Jordy Nelson - 1 Rec, 66 Yds, 1 TD

Top tacklers

- MIN – Robert Blanton - 5 Tackles, 3 Ast
- GB – Morgan Burnett - 8 Tackles, 3 Ast

Continuing the momentum carried over from the victory over the Bears, the Packers trounced their other division rival, the Vikings, 42–10. Eddie Lacy ran for over 100 yards for the first time in the season, with 2 rushing touchdowns, while Julius Peppers reached a career milestone of accumulating over 100 career sacks as well as 10 career interceptions. The win improved the Packers to 3–2, the first time the team was over .500 for the season.

==== Week 6: at Miami Dolphins ====
Week Six: Green Bay Packers at Miami Dolphins – Game summary

Quarter	1	2	3	4	Total
Packers	7	3	7	10	27
Dolphins	3	0	7	14	24

at Sun Life Stadium, Miami Gardens, Florida

- Date: October 12
- Game time: 1:00 p.m. EDT/12:00 p.m. CDT
- Game weather: 86 °F (30 °C), sunny
- Game attendance: 70,875
- Referee: Bill Vinovich
- TV announcers (Fox): Sam Rosen, John Lynch and Pam Oliver
- Recap, Gamebook

Game information

First quarter

- GB – Jordy Nelson 9-yard pass from Aaron Rodgers, Mason Crosby kick, 10:13 (GB 7–0)
- MIA – Caleb Sturgis 48-yard field goal, 08:20 (GB 7–3)

Second quarter

- GB – Mason Crosby 43-yard field goal, 08:29 (GB 10–3)

Third quarter

- MIA – Jarvis Landry 11-yard pass from Ryan Tannehill, Caleb Sturgis kick, 11:55 (10–10)
- GB – Randall Cobb 5-yard pass from Aaron Rodgers, Mason Crosby kick, 03:52 (GB 17–10)

Fourth quarter

- MIA – Lamar Miller 5-yard run, Caleb Sturgis kick, 13:51 (17–17)
- MIA – Mike Wallace 5-yard pass from Ryan Tannehill, Caleb Sturgis kick, 09:20 (MIA 24–17)
- GB – Mason Crosby 30-yard field goal, 04:13 (MIA 24–20)
- GB – Andrew Quarless 4-yard pass from Aaron Rodgers, Mason Crosby kick, 00:06 (GB 27–24)

Top passers

- GB – Aaron Rodgers - 24/42, 264 Yds, 3 TDs
- MIA – Ryan Tannehill - 19/30, 227 Yds, 2 TDs, 2 INTs

Top rushers

- GB – Eddie Lacy - 14 Car, 40 Yds
- MIA – Lamar Miller - 14 Car, 53 Yds, 1 TD

Top receivers

- GB – Jordy Nelson - 9 Rec, 107 Yds, 1 TD
- MIA – Jarvis Landry - 6 Rec, 75 Yds, 1 TD

Top tacklers

- GB – Ha Ha Clinton-Dix - 7 Tackles
- MIA – Reshad Jones - 9 Tackles

The Packers had a solid showing in the first half against the Dolphins, spotting an early 10–3 lead, but the Dolphins were able to rally back and had a 24–17 lead late in the 4th quarter. After a Mason Crosby field goal, the Packers forced Miami to punt, and a 17-yard return by Micah Hyde got the Packers the ball at their own 40 yard line with just over 2 minutes left, but no timeouts remaining. Aaron Rodgers led the Packers rally, first converting a 4th and 10, and later a 3rd and 10. With less than 30 seconds left in the game, with the clock running, Rodgers discreetly called for a "fake spike" play, which he successfully executed with a pass to Davante Adams, who went out of bounds at the Dolphins 4 yard line with 6 seconds left. Rodgers then threw the game-winning touchdown pass to Andrew Quarless, giving the Packers a 27–24 victory.

==== Week 7: vs. Carolina Panthers ====
Week Seven: Carolina Panthers at Green Bay Packers – Game summary

Quarter	1	2	3	4	Total
Panthers	0	3	0	14	17
Packers	21	7	10	0	38

at Lambeau Field, Green Bay, Wisconsin

- Date: October 19
- Game time: 12:00 p.m. CDT
- Game weather: 54 °F (12 °C), (Sunny)
- Game attendance: 78,106
- Referee: Jeff Triplette
- TV announcers (Fox): Sam Rosen, John Lynch and Pam Oliver
- Recap, Gamebook

Game information

First quarter

- GB – Jordy Nelson 59-yard pass from Aaron Rodgers, Mason Crosby kick, 12:01 (GB 7–0)
- GB – Eddie Lacy 5-yard run, Mason Crosby kick, 05:58 (GB 14–0)
- GB – James Starks 13-yard run, Mason Crosby kick, 02:14 (GB 21–0)

Second quarter

- GB – Randall Cobb 3-yard pass from Aaron Rodgers, Mason Crosby kick, 04:07 (GB 28–0)
- CAR – Graham Gano 33-yard field goal, 00:05 (GB 28–3)

Third quarter

- GB – Davante Adams 21-yard pass from Aaron Rodgers, Mason Crosby kick, 10:28 (GB 35–3)
- GB – Mason Crosby 34-yard field goal, 00:13 (GB 38–3)

Fourth quarter

- CAR – Kelvin Benjamin 13-yard pass from Cam Newton, Graham Gano kick, 09:43 (GB 38–10)
- CAR – Brenton Bersin 1-yard pass from Derek Anderson, Graham Gano kick, 01:28 (GB 38–17)

Top passers

- CAR – Cam Newton - 17/31, 205 Yds, 1 TD, 1 INT
- GB – Aaron Rodgers - 19/22, 255 Yds, 3 TDs

Top rushers

- CAR – Jonathan Stewart - 14 Car, 55 Yds
- GB – Eddie Lacy - 12 Car, 63 Yds, 1 TD

Top receivers

- CAR – Greg Olsen - 8 Rec, 105 Yds
- GB – Randall Cobb - 6 Rec, 121 Yds, 1 TD

Top tacklers

- CAR – Luke Kuechly - 7 Tackles, 1 Assist
- GB – Ha Ha Clinton-Dix - 7 Tackles, 1 Assist

The Packers roared out of the gate against Carolina, scoring the first 28 points of the game, and stayed in control for the rest of the game, only giving up two touchdowns to the Panthers late, with the game already out of reach. The Packers improved to 5–2 for the season, and were now 4–0 since Aaron Rodgers told Packers fans to "relax."

==== Week 8: at New Orleans Saints ====
Week Eight: Green Bay Packers at New Orleans Saints – Game summary

Quarter	1	2	3	4	Total
Packers	10	6	0	7	23
Saints	10	6	14	14	44

at Mercedes-Benz Superdome, New Orleans, Louisiana

- Date: October 26
- Game time: 7:30 p.m. CDT
- Game weather: Played indoors (dome stadium)
- Game attendance: 73,146
- Referee: Ed Hochuli
- TV announcers (NBC): Al Michaels, Cris Collinsworth and Michele Tafoya
- Recap, Gamebook

Game information

First quarter

- GB – Randall Cobb 70-yard pass from Aaron Rodgers, Mason Crosby kick, 13:09 (GB 7–0)
- NO – Brandin Cooks 5-yard run, Shayne Graham kick, 09:24 (7–7)
- GB – Mason Crosby 31-yard field goal, 06:13 (GB 10–7)
- NO – Shayne Graham 31-yard field goal, 01:47 (10–10)

Second quarter

- GB – Mason Crosby 49-yard field goal, 13:13 (GB 13–10)
- NO – Shayne Graham 29-yard field goal, 05:57 (13–13)
- GB – Mason Crosby 27-yard field goal, 01:56 (GB 16–13)
- NO – Shayne Graham 37-yard field goal, 00:04 (16–16)

Third quarter

- NO – Brandin Cooks 50-yard pass from Drew Brees, Shayne Graham kick, 05:43 (NO 23–16)
- NO – Jimmy Graham 22-yard pass from Drew Brees, Shayne Graham kick, 02:13 (NO 30–16)

Fourth quarter

- NO – Josh Hill 2-yard pass from Drew Brees, Mason Crosby kick, 09:56 (NO 37–16)
- GB – Aaron Rodgers 14-yard run, Mason Crosby kick, 05:12 (NO 37–23)
- NO – Mark Ingram II 21-yard run, Shayne Graham kick, 03:24 (NO 44–23)

Top passers

- GB – Aaron Rodgers - 28/39, 418 Yds, 1 TD, 2 INTs
- NO – Drew Brees - 27/32, 311 Yds, 3 TDs

Top rushers

- GB – Eddie Lacy - 13 Car, 59 Yds
- NO – Mark Ingram II - 24 Car, 172 Yds, 1 TD

Top receivers

- GB – Randall Cobb - 5 Rec, 126 Yds, 1 TD
- NO – Brandin Cooks - 6 Rec, 94 Yds, 1 TD

Top tacklers

- GB – Davon House - 7 Tackles
- NO – Kenny Vaccaro - 8 Tackles, 2 Assists

With the game tied at 16–16, Aaron Rodgers suffered a hamstring injury in the third quarter, which hampered his playing for the rest of the game. The Saints dominated the rest of the way, outscoring the Packers 28–7 in the second half.

This would be only the third game in NFL history to not have a single punt.

==== Week 9: Bye week ====
No game. Green Bay had a bye week.

==== Week 10: vs. Chicago Bears ====
Week Ten: Chicago Bears at Green Bay Packers – Game summary

Quarter	1	2	3	4	Total
Bears	0	0	7	7	14
Packers	14	28	6	7	55

at Lambeau Field, Green Bay, Wisconsin

- Date: November 9
- Game time: 7:30 p.m. CST
- Game weather: 32 °F (0 °C), clear
- Game attendance: 78,292
- Referee: Craig Wrolstad
- TV announcers (NBC): Al Michaels, Cris Collinsworth and Michele Tafoya
- Recap, Gamebook

Game information

First quarter

- GB – Brandon Bostick 1-yard pass from Aaron Rodgers, Mason Crosby kick, 06:17 (GB 7–0)
- GB – Andrew Quarless 4-yard pass from Aaron Rodgers, Mason Crosby kick, 03:59 (GB 14–0)

Second quarter

- GB – Jordy Nelson 73-yard pass from Aaron Rodgers, Mason Crosby kick, 15:00 (GB 21–0)
- GB – Jordy Nelson 40-yard pass from Aaron Rodgers, Mason Crosby kick, 12:17 (GB 28–0)
- GB – Eddie Lacy 56-yard pass from Aaron Rodgers, Mason Crosby kick, 05:03 (GB 35–0)
- GB – Randall Cobb 18-yard pass from Aaron Rodgers, Mason Crosby kick, 00:19 (GB 42–0)

Third quarter

- GB – Mason Crosby 20-yard field goal, 10:52 (GB 45–0)
- CHI – Brandon Marshall 45-yard pass from Jay Cutler, Robbie Gould kick, 07:57 (GB 45–7)
- GB – Mason Crosby 52-yard field goal, 05:32 (GB 48–7)

Fourth quarter

- GB – Casey Hayward 82-yard interception touchdown, Mason Crosby kick, 10:56 (GB 55–7)
- CHI – Chris Williams 101-yard kickoff return touchdown, Robbie Gould kick, 10:41 (GB 55–14)

Top passers

- CHI – Jay Cutler - 22/37, 272 Yds, 1 TD, 2 INTs
- GB – Aaron Rodgers - 18/27, 315 Yds, 6 TDs

Top rushers

- CHI – Matt Forté - 17 Car, 54 Yds
- GB – DuJuan Harris - 8 Car, 52 Yds

Top receivers

- CHI – Brandon Marshall - 8 Rec, 112 Yds, 1 TD
- GB – Jordy Nelson - 6 Rec, 152 Yds, 2 TDs

Top tacklers

- CHI – Ryan Mundy - 9 Tackles, 2 Assists
- GB – Clay Matthews III - 9 Tackles, 2 Assists, 1 sack

After a week off to let his hurt hamstring to heal, Aaron Rodgers and the rest of the Packers made a dominant showing over the rival Bears, building an insurmountable 42–0 lead in the first half. After forcing a Bears' punt, Rodgers marched the Packers 71 yards in 12 plays to take a 7–0 lead on a touchdown pass to Brandon Bostick on fourth-and-goal. The Bears' following possession lasted only two plays as Micah Hyde intercepted Jay Cutler and returned the ball 9 yards to the Bears 23-yard line. Four plays later Rodgers connected with Andrew Quarless for a 4-yard touchdown. After another punt by the Bears, the Packers went 72 yards in three plays. After the first two plays went for −1 yard, Rodgers hit Jordy Nelson for a 73-yard touchdown pass on the first play of the second quarter. After a three-and-out by the Bears offense, Rodgers once again hit Nelson for a 40-yard touchdown pass on the fourth play of the Packers responding drive. The Bears started to move the ball on their next drive as they drove 70 yards, but turned the ball over on downs at the Packers 4-yard line. The Packers responded by driving 95 yards with Rodgers hitting Eddie Lacy for a 56-yard touchdown on a screen pass, extending the lead to 35–0. The Bears turned the ball over on downs again on their next drive. After both teams lost fumbles, Rodgers hit Randall Cobb, making the score a 42–0 run-over. On their second possession of the second half, Mason Crosby extended the Packers' lead to 45–0. The Bears finally got the scoreboard on their next drive as Cutler connected with Brandon Marshall for a 45-yard touchdown pass to cap of a 75-yard drive. Crosby connected on a 20-yard field goal next and after a three-and-out each, Casey Hayward intercepted Cutler and returned it 82 yards for a touchdown, extending the score to 55-7 early in the fourth quarter. Chris Williams returned the ensuing kickoff 101 yards for a touchdown, making the final score 55–14. Rodgers threw six first-half touchdowns, which matched the Packers' single-game record (with Matt Flynn) and the NFL record for touchdowns in a half (with Daryle Lamonica, 1969). The final score of 55 points tied a Lambeau Field record and Rodgers threw his NFL-record 16th scoring pass of 70 yards or more.

The Bears also became the first NFL team in over 90 years to give up over 50 points in consecutive games.

==== Week 11: vs. Philadelphia Eagles ====
Week Eleven: Philadelphia Eagles at Green Bay Packers – Game summary

Quarter	1	2	3	4	Total
Eagles	0	6	7	7	20
Packers	17	13	9	14	53

at Lambeau Field, Green Bay, Wisconsin

- Date: November 16
- Game time: 3:25 p.m. CST
- Game weather: 27 °F (−3 °C) with 17 °F (−8 °C) wind chill, (Cloudy) with 13 miles per hour (21 km/h) wind
- Game attendance: 78,270
- Referee: Carl Cheffers
- TV announcers (Fox): Joe Buck, Troy Aikman and Erin Andrews
- Recap, Gamebook

Game information

First quarter

- GB – Mason Crosby 27-yard field goal, 13:01 (GB 3–0)
- GB – Davante Adams 6-yard pass from Aaron Rodgers, Mason Crosby kick, 03:38 (GB 10–0)
- GB – Micah Hyde 75-yard punt return touchdown, Mason Crosby kick, 02:18 (GB 17–0)

Second quarter

- PHI – Cody Parkey 33-yard field goal, 13:13 (GB 17–3)
- GB – Jordy Nelson 27-yard pass from Aaron Rodgers, Mason Crosby kick, 10:45 (GB 24–3)
- GB – Eddie Lacy 1-yard run, 02:04 (GB 30–3)
- PHI – Cody Parkey 33-yard field goal, 00:05 (GB 30–6)

Third quarter

- GB – Mason Crosby 33-yard field goal, 07:57 (GB 33–6)
- GB – Julius Peppers 52-yard interception return touchdown, 06:07 (GB 39–6)
- PHI – Jordan Matthews 10-yard pass from Mark Sanchez, Cody Parkey kick, 02:27 (GB 39–13)

Fourth quarter

- GB – Eddie Lacy 32-yard pass from Aaron Rodgers, Mason Crosby kick, 14:52 (GB 46–13)
- GB – Casey Hayward 49-yard fumble return touchdown, 10:49 (GB 53–13)
- PHI – Jeremy Maclin 20-yard pass from Mark Sanchez, Cody Parkey kick, 07:28 (GB 53–20)

Top passers

- PHI – Mark Sanchez - 26/44, 346 Yds, 2 TDs, 2 INTs
- GB – Aaron Rodgers - 22/36, 341 Yds, 3 TDs

Top rushers

- PHI – LeSean McCoy - 23 Car, 88 Yds
- GB – Eddie Lacy - 10 Car, 69 Yds, 1 TD

Top receivers

- PHI – Jordan Matthews - 5 Rec, 107 Yds, 1 TD
- GB – Randall Cobb - 10 Rec, 129 Yds

Top tacklers

- PHI – Cary Williams - 7 Tackles
- GB – Morgan Burnett - 7 Tackles, 2 Assists

The Packers' utter dominance continued with another overwhelming performance over another NFC power, the Eagles. Aaron Rodgers broke Tom Brady's mark of 288 passes at home without being intercepted. The Green Bay quarterback set several other records for passing at home, including an NFL-record 29 straight touchdown passes without an interception.

The Packers scored touchdowns on all three parts of the team, offense, defense, and special teams. Julius Peppers returned an interception for a touchdown, his second of the year, and Micah Hyde returned a punt for a touchdown.

The Packers got going from the very beginning. They drove 75 yards on their opening drive, but had to settle for a 27-yard field goal by Crosby. After an Eagles' punt, the Packers marched on a 13 play, 88-yard drive culminating in a 4-yard touchdown pass to Davante Adams. On the drive, the Packers converted three 3rd-and-longs and took 6:47 off the clock. The Eagles punted again, but this time Micah Hyde returned the punt 75 yards for a touchdown, giving the Packers a shocking 17–0 lead. The Eagles responded on their next possession with a 33-yard field goal by Cody Parkey early in the second quarter. The Eagles, though, had no answer for the Packers' passing game. Rodgers marched the Packers 80 yards in merely 6 plays to increase the lead to 24–3 on a 27-yard touchdown pass to Jordy Nelson. After a punt, the Packers struck again. 80 yards on another time-consuming drive ending with Eddie Lacy driving in a 1-yard touchdown run, but a failed two-point conversion. The Eagles reached the Packers' 15, but settled for another 33-yard field goal as the half expired. Mark Sanchez was stripped early in the 3rd quarter with Nick Perry recovering. The Eagles defense finally made a stand and forced a punt, but the Eagles were forced to punt on their responding drive. The Eagles' defense couldn't hold this time and Crosby kicked a 33-yard field goal increasing the lead to 33–6. The Eagles buried themselves on the next drive as Sanchez threw a 52-yard pick-six to Julius Peppers (with a blocked PAT), making the score 39–6. The Eagles immediately answered, driving 80 yards (with a 4th down conversion) with Sanchez throwing a 10-yard touchdown pass to Jordan Matthews. However, the Packers struck right back with an 80yard scoring drive capped off with Rodgers throwing a screen pass to Lacy who took it 32 yards for a touchdown, pushing the lead to 46–13. However, Eagles mishaps continued as Sanchez threw an interception to Tramon Williams, but Crosby missed a field goal. Then on the following drive after reaching the Packers 40, Sanchez fumbled and Hayward returned the fumble 49 yards for a touchdown, making the score a mind boggling 53–13. The Eagles were able to March 80 yards and score on a 20-yard touchdown reception by Jeremy Maclin on their next drive closing the scoring.

The Packers achieved a new franchise mark, as this was the first time ever since the franchise started playing in the NFL that they scored over 50 points in consecutive games (the Packers had scored over 50 points in 6 consecutive games as a "town team" in 1919, their first season of existence.). Green Bay improved to a record of 7–3.

==== Week 12: at Minnesota Vikings ====
Week Twelve: Green Bay Packers at Minnesota Vikings – Game summary

Quarter	1	2	3	4	Total
Packers	7	7	3	7	24
Vikings	0	10	3	8	21

at TCF Bank Stadium, Minneapolis, Minnesota

- Date: November 23
- Game time: 12:00 p.m. CST
- Game weather: 49 °F (9 °C), cloudy
- Game attendance: 52,386
- Referee: Clete Blakeman
- TV announcers (Fox): Kenny Albert, Daryl Johnston and Tony Siragusa
- Recap, Gamebook

Game information

First quarter

- GB – Eddie Lacy 1-yard run, Mason Crosby kick 01:37 (GB 7–0)

Second quarter

- MIN – Charles Johnson 22-yard pass from Teddy Bridgewater, Blair Walsh kick, 11:12 (7–7)
- GB – Richard Rodgers 1-yard pass from Aaron Rodgers, Mason Crosby kick, 05:30 (GB 14–7)
- MIN – Blair Walsh 39-yard field goal, 00:21 (GB 14–10)

Third quarter

- MIN – Blair Walsh 51-yard field goal, 06:47 (GB 14–13)
- GB – Mason Crosby 48-yard field goal, 02:54 (GB 17–13)

Fourth quarter

- GB – Eddie Lacy 10-yard pass from Aaron Rodgers, Mason Crosby kick, 08:41 (GB 24–13)
- MIN – Greg Jennings 5-yard pass from Teddy Bridgewater, two-point conversion successful, 03:28 (GB 24–21)

Top passers

- GB – Aaron Rodgers - 19/29, 209 Yds, 2 TDs
- MIN – Teddy Bridgewater - 21/37, 210 Yds, 2 TDs, 1 INT

Top rushers

- GB – Eddie Lacy - 25 Car, 125 Yds, 1 TD
- MIN – Jerick McKinnon - 15 Car, 54 Yds

Top receivers

- GB – Jordy Nelson - 8 Rec, 68 Yds
- MIN – Greg Jennings - 4 Rec, 83 Yds, 1 TD

Top tacklers

- GB – Ha Ha Clinton-Dix - 7 Tackles, 2 Assists
- MIN – Robert Blanton - 8 Tackles, 2 Assists

Coming off two consecutive 50+ points wins, the Packers were able to improve to an 8–3 record and captured the first place in their division.

With the Vikings playing their home games at TCF Bank Stadium while their new stadium was being built, this marked the first outdoor Packers at Vikings game since 1981.

==== Week 13: vs. New England Patriots ====
Week Thirteen: New England Patriots at Green Bay Packers – Game summary

Quarter	1	2	3	4	Total
Patriots	0	14	0	7	21
Packers	13	10	0	3	26

at Lambeau Field, Green Bay, Wisconsin

- Date: November 30
- Game time: 3:25 p.m. CST
- Game weather: 25 °F (−4 °C), (Sunny)
- Game attendance: 78,431
- Referee: Ed Hochuli
- TV announcers (CBS): Jim Nantz, Phil Simms and Tracy Wolfson
- Recap, Gamebook

Game information

First quarter

- GB – Mason Crosby 32-yard field goal, 11:17 (GB 3–0)
- GB – Mason Crosby 35-yard field goal, 03:32 (GB 6–0)
- GB – Richard Rodgers 32-yard pass from Aaron Rodgers, Mason Crosby kick, 00:15 (GB 13–0)

Second quarter

- NE – Brandon Bolden 6-yard run, Stephen Gostkowski kick, 12:59 (GB 13–7)
- GB – Mason Crosby 33-yard field goal, 05:58 (GB 16–7)
- NE – Brandon LaFell 2-yard pass from Tom Brady, Stephen Gostkowski kick, 01:14 (GB 16–14)
- GB – Jordy Nelson 45-yard pass from Aaron Rodgers, Mason Crosby kick, 00:23 (GB 23–14)

Third quarter

- No scoring plays

Fourth quarter

- NE – Brandon LaFell 15-yard pass from Tom Brady, Stephen Gostkowski kick, 13:55 (GB 23–21)
- GB – Mason Crosby 28-yard field goal, 08:45 (GB 26–21)

Top passers

- NE – Tom Brady - 22/35, 245 Yds, 2 TDs
- GB – Aaron Rodgers - 24/38, 368 Yds, 2 TDs

Top rushers

- NE – LeGarrette Blount - 10 Car, 58 Yds
- GB – Eddie Lacy - 21 Car, 98 Yds

Top receivers

- NE – Rob Gronkowski - 7 Rec, 98 Yds
- GB – Davante Adams - 6 Rec, 121 Yds

Top tacklers

- NE – Patrick Chung - 8 Tackles, 3 Assists
- GB – Tramon Williams - 8 Tackles, 1 Assists

The Packers improved to a 9–3 record by defeating the New England Patriots 26–21, despite going 0 for 4 in the red zone. It was the first matchup between Aaron Rodgers and Tom Brady, as Rodgers missed the 2010 matchup at Gillette Stadium with a concussion. Aaron Rodgers continued a streak of passes at home without an interception: 360 passes including 31 touchdown passes. The Patriots were only behind 16–14 with a minute left in the first half, but a 45-yard touchdown pass to Jordy Nelson gave Green Bay a 9-point halftime lead. A scoreless third quarter, and no red-zone touchdowns for the entire game for the Packers, gave New England a chance for victory. The Patriots scored again to make it only a two-point deficit, but another Green Bay field goal and stout fourth-quarter defense gave the Packers victory over a strong Patriots squad.

==== Week 14: vs. Atlanta Falcons ====
Week Fourteen: Atlanta Falcons at Green Bay Packers – Game summary

Quarter	1	2	3	4	Total
Falcons	7	0	10	20	37
Packers	7	24	3	9	43

at Lambeau Field, Green Bay, Wisconsin

- Date: December 8
- Game time: 7:30 p.m. CST
- Game weather: 33 °F (1 °C), flurries
- Game attendance: 77,512
- Referee: Pete Morelli
- TV announcers (ESPN): Mike Tirico, Jon Gruden and Lisa Salters
- Recap, Gamebook

Game information

First quarter

- GB – James Starks 3-yard run, Mason Crosby kick, 11:18 (GB 7–0)
- ATL – Steven Jackson 4-yard run, Matt Bryant kick, 07:05 (7–7)

Second quarter

- GB – Eddie Lacy 1-yard run, Mason Crosby kick, 15:00 (GB 14–7)
- GB – Mason Crosby 38-yard field goal, 07:22 (GB 17–7)
- GB – Eddie Lacy 1-yard pass from Aaron Rodgers, Mason Crosby kick, 04:24 (GB 24–7)
- GB – Jordy Nelson 10-yard pass from Aaron Rodgers, Mason Crosby kick, 00:31 (GB 31–7)

Third quarter

- ATL – Eric Weems 5-yard pass from Matt Ryan, Matt Bryant kick, 12:39 (GB 31–14)
- ATL – Matt Bryant 50-yard field goal, 08:25 (GB 31–17)
- GB – Mason Crosby 33-yard field goal, 04:00 (GB 34–17)

Fourth quarter

- ATL – Julio Jones 22-yard pass from Matt Ryan, Matt Bryant kick, 12:39 (GB 34–24)
- GB – Jordy Nelson 60-yard pass from Aaron Rodgers, Mason Crosby kick, 10:38 (GB 40–24)
- ATL – Roddy White 1-yard pass from Matt Ryan, 06:20 (GB 40–30)
- GB – Mason Crosby 53-yard field goal, 04:37 (GB 43–30)
- ATL – Harry Douglas 2-yard pass from Matt Ryan, Matt Bryant kick, 02:15 (GB 43–37)

Top passers

- ATL – Matt Ryan - 24/39, 375 Yds, 4 TDs, 1 INT
- GB – Aaron Rodgers - 24/36, 327 Yds, 3 TDs

Top rushers

- ATL – Steven Jackson - 16 Car, 50 Yds, 1 TD
- GB – Eddie Lacy - 10 Car, 75 Yds, 1 TD

Top receivers

- ATL – Julio Jones - 11 Rec, 259 Yds, 1 TD
- GB – Jordy Nelson - 8 Rec, 146 Yds, 2 TDs

Top tacklers

- ATL – Dwight Lowery - 11 Tackles, 2 Assists, 1 FF
- GB – Morgan Burnett - 6 Tackles, 2 Assists, 1 INT

Once again Aaron Rodgers had a big day shredding the Falcons' last-ranked defense, but the Falcons fought back.

The Packers received the opening kickoff and stormed 81 yards needing only 7 plays with James Starks running in a 3-yard touchdown. The drive was so efficient they didn't even face a third down. As a sign of things to come, the Falcons struck right back with a 4-yard Steven Jackson touchdown run to end a 72-yard drive. The Packers, as they did often, answered the Falcons with another touchdown of their own. Showing off their ability to kill the clock with long drives, the Packers used 13 plays and over 7 minutes to go 80 yards with Lacy running in his second touchdown of the game on the first play of the second quarter. After a Falcons three-and-out the Packers again worked the clock, driving 80 yards in just under six minutes, but the Falcons defense made a rare stand and Crosby kicked a field goal. Morgan Burnett intercepted Matt Ryan on their next possession and returned it 32 yards to the Falcons 15. Four plays later Rodgers threw a 1-yard touchdown pass to Lacy. The Falcons offense continued to sputter as they punted. The Packers stayed hot with Rodgers hitting Nelson for a 10-yard touchdown with twenty-four seconds left in the half. The Falcons managed to reach field goal range with the big play being a Ryan 30-yard bomb to Julio Jones. However, Brad Jones blocked Matt Bryant's 53-yard field goal attempt, leaving the score 31–7 at halftime. The Falcons busted out in the third quarter. On the first play from scrimmage Ryan launched a pass to Jones for 79 yards the Packers 3-yard line. However, they lost two yards on their next three plays, but on fourth-and-goal from the 5-yard line Ryan threw a 5-yard touchdown pass to Eric Weems, trimming the score to 31–14. After a Packers punt the Falcons reached the Packers 31, but were forced to settle for a 50-yard field goal. The Packers added a field goal on their next drive, the Falcons mimicked the Packers clock-killing strategy (possibly, ultimately to their detriment) taking six-and-a-half minutes off the clock as they traveled 72 yards with Ryan dropping a 22-yard touchdown pass into the hands of Jones who had the best game of his career. However, Rodgers and the Packers offense regrouped and stormed 74 yards in four plays with Rodgers hitting his number one guy Nelson for a 60-yard touchdown pass. The Falcons' Rashede Hageman blocked Crosby's PAT keeping the deficit two scores at 40–24. The shootout continued as the Falcons answered right back with Ryan lobbing a 1-yard touchdown pass to Roddy White, but the two-point conversion failed which would prove critical as the score remained 40–30. The Falcons onside kick attempt failed, but they didn't allow a first down, keeping them in the game as Crosby nailed a 53-yard field goal, increasing the lead to 43–30. Ryan continued to shred the Packers' defense, darting a 2-yard touchdown pass to Harry Douglas, making the score 43–37 and giving the Falcons a chance to pull off the improbable comeback. However, a 41-yard run by James Starks enabled the Packers to run out the clock and hold on for the win.

==== Week 15: at Buffalo Bills ====
Week Fifteen: Green Bay Packers at Buffalo Bills – Game summary

Quarter	1	2	3	4	Total
Packers	3	7	0	3	13
Bills	7	3	6	5	21

at Ralph Wilson Stadium, Orchard Park, New York

- Date: December 14
- Game time: 1:00 p.m. EST/12:00 p.m. CST
- Game weather: 38 °F (3 °C), partly cloudy
- Game attendance: 70,214
- Referee: Bill Leavy
- TV announcers (Fox): Justin Kutcher, David Diehl and Laura Okmin
- Recap, Gamebook

Game information

First quarter

- GB – Mason Crosby 45-yard field goal, 04:31 (GB 3–0)
- BUF – Marcus Thigpen 75-yard punt return run, Dan Carpenter kick, 02:27 (BUF 7–3)

Second quarter

- GB – Eddie Lacy 1-yard run, Mason Crosby kick, 14:19 (GB 10–7)
- BUF – Dan Carpenter 27-yard field goal, 08:07 (10–10)

Third quarter

- BUF – Dan Carpenter 51-yard field goal, 09:26 (BUF 13–10)
- BUF – Dan Carpenter 35-yard field goal, 04:22 (BUF 16–10)

Fourth quarter

- BUF – Dan Carpenter 48-yard field goal, 09:28 (BUF 19–10)
- GB – Mason Crosby 34-yard field goal, 04:53 (BUF 19–13)
- BUF – Mario Williams safety, 01:58 (BUF 21–13)

Top passers

- GB – Aaron Rodgers - 17/42, 185 Yds, 2 INTs
- BUF – Kyle Orton - 14/27, 158 Yds, 1 INT

Top rushers

- GB – Eddie Lacy - 15 Car, 97 Yds, 1 TD
- BUF – Fred Jackson - 20 Car, 71 Yds

Top receivers

- GB – Randall Cobb - 7 Rec, 96 Yds
- BUF – Fred Jackson - 3 Rec, 27 Yds

Top tacklers

- GB – Ha Ha Clinton-Dix - 6 Tackles, 7 Assists
- BUF – Aaron Williams - 5 Tackles, 4 Assists

Both teams' defenses dictated the game throughout by not allowing a TD-pass and only two TDs overall. Aaron Rodgers threw two interceptions after only three the whole season. The Packers' receivers had a bad day as well, dropping 8 passes, the most drops by an NFL team in a game since 2008. The Packers fell to 10–4 with the loss, and 1–5 in Buffalo as a franchise.

==== Week 16: at Tampa Bay Buccaneers ====
Week Sixteen: Green Bay Packers at Tampa Bay Buccaneers – Game summary

Quarter	1	2	3	4	Total
Packers	7	3	0	10	20
Buccaneers	0	3	0	0	3

at Raymond James Stadium, Tampa, Florida

- Date: December 21
- Game time: 1:00 p.m. EST/12:00 p.m. CST
- Game weather: 75 °F (24 °C), cloudy
- Game attendance: 64,247
- Referee: Terry McAulay
- TV announcers (Fox): Chris Myers, Ronde Barber and Jennifer Hale
- Recap, Gamebook

Game information

First quarter

- GB – Eddie Lacy 44-yard run, Mason Crosby kick, 01:00 (GB 7–0)

Second quarter

- GB – Mason Crosby 48-yard field goal, 10:05 (GB 10–0)
- TB – Patrick Murray 43-yard field goal, 00:04 (GB 10–3)

Third quarter

- No Scoring Plays

Fourth quarter

- GB – Mason Crosby 25-yard field goal, 10:23 (GB 13–3)
- GB – Jordy Nelson 1-yard pass from Aaron Rodgers, Mason Crosby kick, 02:51 (GB 20–3)

Top passers

- GB – Aaron Rodgers - 31/40, 318 Yds, 1 TD
- TB – Josh McCown - 12/26, 147 Yds, 1 INT

Top rushers

- GB – Eddie Lacy - 17 Car, 99 Yds, 1 TD
- TB – Doug Martin - 10 Car, 17 Yds

Top receivers

- GB – Randall Cobb - 11 Rec, 131 Yds
- TB – Mike Evans - 4 Rec, 49 Yds

Top tacklers

- GB – Morgan Burnett - 9 Tackles, 1 Assists, 0.5 sacks
- TB – Bradley McDougald - 8 Tackles, 1 Assists

The Packers gave a strong defensive show in a win over the lowly Buccaneers, holding Tampa Bay to 109 yards of net offense, and only 16 yards rushing. The Packers' offense scuffled some, as Aaron Rodgers nursed a sore calf. Running back Eddie Lacy broke the 1,000-yard mark for the season, making him the first Packer since John Brockington to rush for over 1,000 yards in each of his first two seasons. The 20–3 win gave Green Bay a 11–4 record and secured the Packers a spot in the playoffs.

==== Week 17: vs. Detroit Lions ====
Week Seventeen: Detroit Lions at Green Bay Packers – Game summary

Quarter	1	2	3	4	Total
Lions	0	7	7	6	20
Packers	7	7	7	9	30

at Lambeau Field, Green Bay, Wisconsin

- Date: December 28
- Game time: 3:25 p.m. CST
- Game weather: 27 °F (−3 °C), cloudy
- Game attendance: 78,408
- Referee: Walt Anderson
- TV announcers (Fox): Joe Buck, Troy Aikman and Erin Andrews
- Recap, Gamebook

Game information

First quarter

- GB – Micah Hyde 55-yard punt return touchdown, Mason Crosby kick, 05:04 (GB 7–0)

Second quarter

- GB – Randall Cobb 4-yard pass from Aaron Rodgers, Mason Crosby kick, 02:30 (GB 14–0)
- DET – Calvin Johnson 20-yard pass from Matthew Stafford, Matt Prater kick, 00:29 (GB 14–7)

Third quarter

- DET – Calvin Johnson 4-yard pass from Matthew Stafford, Matt Prater kick, 07:39 (14–14)
- GB – Randall Cobb 7-yard pass from Aaron Rodgers, Mason Crosby kick, 03:39 (GB 21–14)

Fourth quarter

- GB – Aaron Rodgers 1-yard run, Mason Crosby kick, 08:56 (GB 28–14)
- GB – Green Bay safety, 02:39 (GB 30–14)
- DET – Theo Riddick 6-yard pass from Matthew Stafford, 01:50 (GB 30–20)

Top passers

- DET – Matthew Stafford - 20/41, 217 Yds, 3 TDs
- GB – Aaron Rodgers - 17/22, 226 Yds, 2 TDs

Top rushers

- DET – Joique Bell - 13 Car, 60 Yds
- GB – Eddie Lacy - 26 Car, 100 Yds

Top receivers

- DET – Golden Tate - 3 Rec, 45 Yds
- GB – Jordy Nelson - 6 Rec, 86 Yds

Top tacklers

- DET – DeAndre Levy - 8 Tackles, 2 Assists
- GB – Sam Barrington - 5 Tackles, 2 Assists

The Packers and Lions, both 11–4 and playoff-bound, faced off with the NFC North division title on the line, as well as a first-round bye in the playoffs. The Packers got the early lead on a Micah Hyde punt return for a touchdown, but then suffered a potentially crippling loss when Aaron Rodgers reinjured his calf while throwing a touchdown pass to Randall Cobb. Rodgers had to be helped off the field and was then carted to the locker room. The game's momentum swung to the Lions as they came back to tie the game in the third quarter. Aaron Rodgers then returned to the game, gutting through the calf injury to give the Packers the lead back with first another touchdown pass to Cobb and then scoring a touchdown of his own on a quarterback sneak. The 30–20 win gave the Packers a final 12–4 record, the number 2 seed in the playoffs, and their 4th straight NFC North division title.

=== Postseason ===
==== NFC Wild card Playoffs ====
Clinching the division and the #2 overall seed in the NFC, the Packers had a first round bye.

==== NFC Divisional Playoffs: vs. #3 Dallas Cowboys ====
NFC Divisional Playoffs: (#3) Dallas Cowboys at (#2) Green Bay Packers – Game summary

Quarter	1	2	3	4	Total
Cowboys	7	7	7	0	21
Packers	7	3	10	6	26

at Lambeau Field, Green Bay, Wisconsin

- Date: January 11, 2015
- Game time: 12:05 p.m. CST
- Game weather: 24 °F (−4 °C), cloudy
- Game attendance: 79,704
- Referee: Gene Steratore
- TV announcers (Fox): Joe Buck, Troy Aikman, Erin Andrews and Chris Myers
- Recap, Gamebook

Game information

First quarter

- GB – Andrew Quarless 4-yard pass from Aaron Rodgers, Mason Crosby kick, 08:34 (GB 7–0)
- DAL – Tyler Clutts 1-yard pass from Tony Romo, Dan Bailey kick, 01:09 (7–7)

Second quarter

- DAL – Terrance Williams 38-yard pass from Tony Romo, Dan Bailey kick, 08:29 (DAL 14–7)
- GB – Mason Crosby 40-yard field goal, 00:03 (DAL 14–10)

Third quarter

- GB – Mason Crosby 30-yard field goal, 07:49 (DAL 14–13)
- DAL – DeMarco Murray 1-yard run, Dan Bailey kick, 04:16 (DAL 21–13)
- GB – Davante Adams 46-yard pass from Aaron Rodgers, Mason Crosby kick, 01:52 (DAL 21–20)

Fourth quarter

- GB – Richard Rodgers 13-yard pass from Aaron Rodgers, 2 point conversion attempt failed, 09:10 (GB 26–21)

Top passers

- DAL – Tony Romo - 15/19, 191 Yds, 2 TDs
- GB – Aaron Rodgers - 24/35, 316 Yds, 3 TDs

Top rushers

- DAL – DeMarco Murray - 6 Car, 71 Yds
- GB – Eddie Lacy - 19 Car, 101 Yds

Top receivers

- DAL – Jason Witten - 6 Rec, 71 Yds
- GB – Davante Adams - 7 Rec, 117 Yds, 1 TD

Top tacklers

- DAL – Barry Church - 7 Tackles, 1 Assists
- GB – Julius Peppers - 6 Tackles, 1 Sack, 1FF

==== NFC Championship: vs. #1 Seattle Seahawks ====
NFC Championship: (#2) Green Bay Packers at (#1) Seattle Seahawks – Game summary

Quarter	1	2	3	4	OT	Total
Packers	13	3	0	6	0	22
Seahawks	0	0	7	15	6	28

at CenturyLink Field, Seattle, Washington

- Date: January 18, 2015
- Game time: 2:05 p.m. CST/12:05 p.m. PST
- Game weather: 52 °F (11 °C), rain
- Game attendance: 68,538
- Referee: Tony Corrente
- TV announcers (Fox): Joe Buck, Troy Aikman and Erin Andrews
- Recap, Gamebook

Game information

First quarter

- GB – Mason Crosby 18-yard field goal, 08:10 (GB 3–0)
- GB – Mason Crosby 19-yard field goal, 05:10 (GB 6–0)
- GB – Randall Cobb 13-yard pass from Aaron Rodgers, 00:06 (GB 13–0)

Second quarter

- GB – Mason Crosby 40-yard field goal, 09:42 (GB 16–0)

Third quarter

- SEA – Garry Gilliam 19-yard pass from Jon Ryan, 04:50 (GB 16–7)

Fourth quarter

- GB – Mason Crosby 48-yard field goal, 10:58 (GB 19–7)
- SEA – Russell Wilson 1-yard run, Steven Hauschka kick, 02:13 (GB 19–14)
- SEA – Marshawn Lynch 24-yard run, 2-pt conversion, 01:33 (SEA 22–19)
- GB – Mason Crosby 48-yard field goal, 0:14 (22–22)

Overtime

- SEA – Jermaine Kearse 35-yard pass from Russell Wilson, 11:41 (SEA 28–22)

Top passers

- GB – Aaron Rodgers - 19/34, 178 Yds, 1 TD, 2 INTs
- SEA – Russell Wilson - 14/29, 209 Yds, 1 TD, 4 INTs

Top rushers

- GB – Eddie Lacy - 21 Car, 73 Yds
- SEA – Marshawn Lynch - 25 Car, 157 Yds, 1 TD

Top receivers

- GB – Jordy Nelson - 5 Rec, 71 Yds
- SEA – Doug Baldwin - 6 Rec, 106 Yds

Top tacklers

- GB – Morgan Burnett - 8 Tackles, 2 Assists, 2 sacks, 1 INT
- SEA – Byron Maxwell - 5 Tackles, 1 Assists, 1 INT

Green Bay lost this game despite having a 16–0 halftime lead and a 19–7 lead plus possession of the football with 5 minutes remaining in the 4th quarter. The Packers forced 5 turnovers, with 4 of them being Wilson interceptions. However, the Packers only scored 6 points off of those 5 turnovers and had only one touchdown, allowing the Seahawks to remain within striking distance. With over 5 minutes remaining in the 4th quarter, Wilson was intercepted for the 4th time by safety Morgan Burnett, who then slid down as if the game was just won. The Packers executed an ultra-conservative tactic by running the ball three times in a row, for negative 2 yards, negative 2 yards, and two yards, wasting only 10 seconds of clock due to Seattle timeouts. The Packers punted and the Seahawks scored their first offensive touchdown on their next drive to cut the deficit to 5. With 2:09 remaining and the Packers leading 19–14, the Seahawks were able to recover an onside kick that was fumbled by Packer TE Brandon Bostick. They scored a touchdown on the following drive to go up 20–19. A hail mary attempt on a two-point conversion made it 22-19 Seahawks with 1:25 remaining in regulation. The Packers forced overtime with a Mason Crosby field goal, but the Seahawks won the coin toss and elected to receive the ball. The Seahawks scored a touchdown on their first drive in overtime, ending the game and the Packers' season. Additionally, the season ended the same way it began, by losing to the Seahawks at CenturyLink Field in the Kickoff Game.

== Standings ==
=== Division ===
NFC North
	W	L	T	PCT	DIV	CONF	PF	PA	STK
^{(2)} Green Bay Packers	12	4	0	.750	5–1	9–3	486	348	W2
^{(6)} Detroit Lions	11	5	0	.688	5–1	9–3	321	282	L1
Minnesota Vikings	7	9	0	.438	1–5	6–6	325	343	W1
Chicago Bears	5	11	0	.313	1–5	4–8	319	442	L5

=== Conference ===
NFC
#	Team	Division	W	L	T	PCT	DIV	CONF	SOS	SOV	STK
Division leaders
1 (Note: Seattle, Green Bay and Dallas were ranked in seeds 1–3 based on conference record.)	Seattle Seahawks	West	12	4	0	.750	5–1	10–2	.525	.513	W6
2	Green Bay Packers	North	12	4	0	.750	5–1	9–3	.482	.440	W2
3	Dallas Cowboys	East	12	4	0	.750	4–2	8–4	.445	.422	W4
4	Carolina Panthers	South	7	8	1	.469	4–2	6–6	.490	.357	W4
Wild Cards
5 (Note: Arizona defeated Detroit head-to-head (Week 11, 14–6).)	Arizona Cardinals	West	11	5	0	.688	3–3	8–4	.523	.477	L2
6	Detroit Lions	North	11	5	0	.688	5–1	9–3	.471	.392	L1
Did not qualify for the postseason
7	Philadelphia Eagles	East	10	6	0	.625	4–2	6–6	.490	.416	W1
8	San Francisco 49ers	West	8	8	0	.500	2–4	7–5	.527	.508	W1
9 (Note: New Orleans defeated Minnesota head-to-head (Week 3, 20–9).)	New Orleans Saints	South	7	9	0	.438	3–3	6–6	.486	.415	W1
10	Minnesota Vikings	North	7	9	0	.438	1–5	6–6	.475	.308	W1
11 (Note: The NY Giants defeated both Atlanta and St. Louis head-to-head (Atlanta: Week 5, 30–20; St. Louis: Week 16, 37–27), while Atlanta finished ahead of St. Louis based on conference record.)	New York Giants	East	6	10	0	.375	2–4	4–8	.512	.323	L1
12	Atlanta Falcons	South	6	10	0	.375	5–1	6–6	.482	.380	L1
13	St. Louis Rams	West	6	10	0	.375	2–4	4–8	.531	.427	L3
14	Chicago Bears	North	5	11	0	.313	1–5	4–8	.529	.338	L5
15	Washington Redskins	East	4	12	0	.250	2–4	2–10	.496	.422	L1
16	Tampa Bay Buccaneers	South	2	14	0	.125	0–6	1–11	.486	.469	L6
Tiebreakers (Note: When breaking ties for three or more teams under the NFL's rules, they are first broken within divisions, then comparing only the highest-ranked remaining team from each division.)

== Statistics ==
=== Regular season statistical leaders ===
	Player(s)	Value
Passing yards	Aaron Rodgers	4,381 Yards
Passing touchdowns	Aaron Rodgers	38
Rushing yards	Eddie Lacy	1,139 Yards
Rushing touchdowns	Eddie Lacy	9
Receptions	Jordy Nelson	98 Receptions
Receiving yards	Jordy Nelson	1,519 Yards
Receiving touchdowns	Jordy Nelson	13
Kickoff Return Yards	DuJuan Harris	456 Yards
Punt return Yards	Micah Hyde	221 Yards
Tackles	Morgan Burnett	129 Tackles
Sacks	Clay Matthews III	11 Sacks
Interceptions	Casey Hayward; Tramon Williams	3 INTs

Statistical values are correct through Week 17
*leads the league in statistical category

=== Best game performances ===
	Player(s)	Value	Opponent
Passing yards	Aaron Rodgers	418 Yards	New Orleans Saints
Passing touchdowns	Aaron Rodgers	6	Chicago Bears
Rushing yards	Eddie Lacy	125 Yards	Minnesota Vikings
Rushing touchdowns	Eddie Lacy	2	Minnesota Vikings
Receiving yards	Jordy Nelson	209 Yards	New York Jets
Receiving touchdowns	Randall Cobb; Randall Cobb, Jordy Nelson; Jordy Nelson; Jordy Nelson; Randall Cobb	2	New York Jets; Chicago Bears; Chicago Bears; Atlanta Falcons; Detroit Lions
Tackles	Morgan Burnett, A. J. Hawk	13 Tackles	Chicago Bears
Sacks	Clay Matthews III	2.5 Sacks	Tampa Bay Buccaneers
Interceptions	Tramon Williams; Ha Ha Clinton-Dix, Davon House; Clay Matthews III, Sam Shields; Jamari Lattimore, Julius Peppers; Casey Hayward, Sam Shields; Casey Hayward; Casey Hayward, Micah Hyde; Julius Peppers, Tramon Williams; Micah Hyde; Morgan Burnett; Tramon Williams; Datone Jones	1 INT	New York Jets; Detroit Lions; Chicago Bears; Minnesota Vikings; Miami Dolphins; Carolina Panthers; Chicago Bears; Philadelphia Eagles; Minnesota Vikings; Atlanta Falcons; Buffalo Bills; Tampa Bay Buccaneers

Statistical values are correct through Week 17

== Awards ==
Recipient	Award(s)
Aaron Rodgers	Week 4: NFC Offensive Player of the Week; Week 7: NFC Offensive Player of the Week; Week 10: NFC Offensive Player of the Week; Week 17: NFC Offensive Player of the Week; November: NFC Offensive Player of the Month; Week 10: FedEx Ground Player of the Week; Week 11: FedEx Ground Player of the Week; Probowler; All-Pro First Team; NFL Most Valuable Player
Julius Peppers	Week 5: NFC Defensive Player of the Week
Eddie Lacy	Week 12: NFC Offensive Player of the Week
Clay Matthews III	Week 16: NFC Defensive Player of the Week; Probowler
Micah Hyde	Week 17: NFC Special teams Player of the Week
John Kuhn	Probowler; All-Pro First Team
Jordy Nelson	Probowler; All-Pro Second Team
Josh Sitton	Probowler; All-Pro Second Team
