= Sam Barrington =

American football player (born 1990)

No. 58, 94, 97
- Position: Linebacker

Personal information
- Born: October 5, 1990 (age 36); Orlando, Florida, U.S.
- Listed height: 6 ft 1 in (1.85 m)
- Listed weight: 246 lb (112 kg)

Career information
- High school: Parker (Jacksonville, Florida)
- College: South Florida
- NFL draft: 2013: 7th round, 232nd overall pick

Career history
- Green Bay Packers (2013–2016); Kansas City Chiefs (2016); New Orleans Saints (2016); Buffalo Bills (2017)*
- * Offseason or practice squad member only

Awards and highlights
- Second-team All-Big East (2012)

Career NFL statistics
- Total tackles: 58
- Sacks: 1
- Stats at Pro Football Reference

Samuel Kofi Barrington (born October 5, 1990) is an American former professional football player who was a linebacker in the National Football League (NFL). He played college football for the South Florida Bulls, and was selected by the Green Bay Packers in the seventh round of the 2013 NFL draft. Barrington has also played for the Kansas City Chiefs, New Orleans Saints, and Buffalo Bills.

== Early life ==
Barrington attended Terry Parker High School in Jacksonville, Florida, where he started all four years and played on both sides of the ball. He logged 1,188 yards rushing and 17 touchdowns on 108 carries as a senior, and also added more than 109 tackles, five sacks, one interception, two forced fumbles, two fumble recoveries and six pass break-ups while playing multiple linebacker positions. He recorded 104 tackles, including 74 solo stops, three sacks and three forced fumbles during his junior season.

== Professional career ==
External videos
- Barrington's NFL Combine workout

Pre-draft measurables
Height	Weight	Arm length	Hand span	40-yard dash	10-yard split	20-yard split	20-yard shuttle	Three-cone drill	Vertical jump	Broad jump	Bench press	Wonderlic
6 ft 1 in (1.85 m)	246 lb (112 kg)	32 1/4	10 1/4	4.91 s	1.71 s	2.85 s	4.25 s	7.16 s	32.5 in (0.83 m)	9 ft 9 in (2.97 m)	22 reps	23
All values are from NFL Combine, except short shuttle and cone drill from Pro Day

=== Green Bay Packers ===
Barrington was selected in the seventh round (232nd overall) by the Green Bay Packers in the 2013 NFL draft. On May 10, 2013, he signed a contract with the Packers. Barrington was placed on injured reserve on November 5.

Barrington suffered a foot injury against the Chicago Bears in Week 1 of the 2015 season. Barrington was placed on injured reserve two days later. He was the Packers' nominee for the Walter Payton NFL Man of the Year Award in 2015.

On September 3, 2016, Barrington was released by the Packers during the final round of roster cuts.

=== Kansas City Chiefs ===
On September 4, 2016, Barrington was claimed off waivers by the Kansas City Chiefs. He was released by the Chiefs on November 1.

=== New Orleans Saints ===
On November 9, 2016, Barrington was signed by the New Orleans Saints.

=== Buffalo Bills ===
On July 25, 2017, Barrington signed with the Buffalo Bills. He was placed on injured reserve on September 2, and then reached an injury settlement with the team the next day and was released.

=== Statistics ===
Source: NFL.com

Year	Team	G	GS	Tackles					Interceptions						Fumbles	
Year	Team	G	GS	Total	Solo	Ast	Sck	SFTY	PDef	Int	Yds	Avg	Lng	TDs	FF	FR
Regular season
2013	GB	7	0	2	2	0	0.0	0	0	0	0	0.0	0	0	0	0
2014	GB	14	7	53	40	13	1.0	0	1	0	0	0.0	0	0	0	0
2015	GB	1	1	1	1	0	0.0	0	0	0	0	0.0	0	0	0	0
2016	KC	2	0	0	0	0	0.0	0	0	0	0	0.0	0	0	0	0
Total		24	8	56	43	13	1.0	0	1	0	0	0.0	0	0	0	0
Postseason
2014	GB	2	2	14	6	8	0.0	0	1	0	0	0.0	0	0	0	0
Total		2	2	14	6	8	0.0	0	1	0	0	0.0	0	0	0	0

== Personal life ==
Barrington is a cousin of former Packers nose tackle Letroy Guion.
