= Malliciah Goodman =

American football player (born 1990)

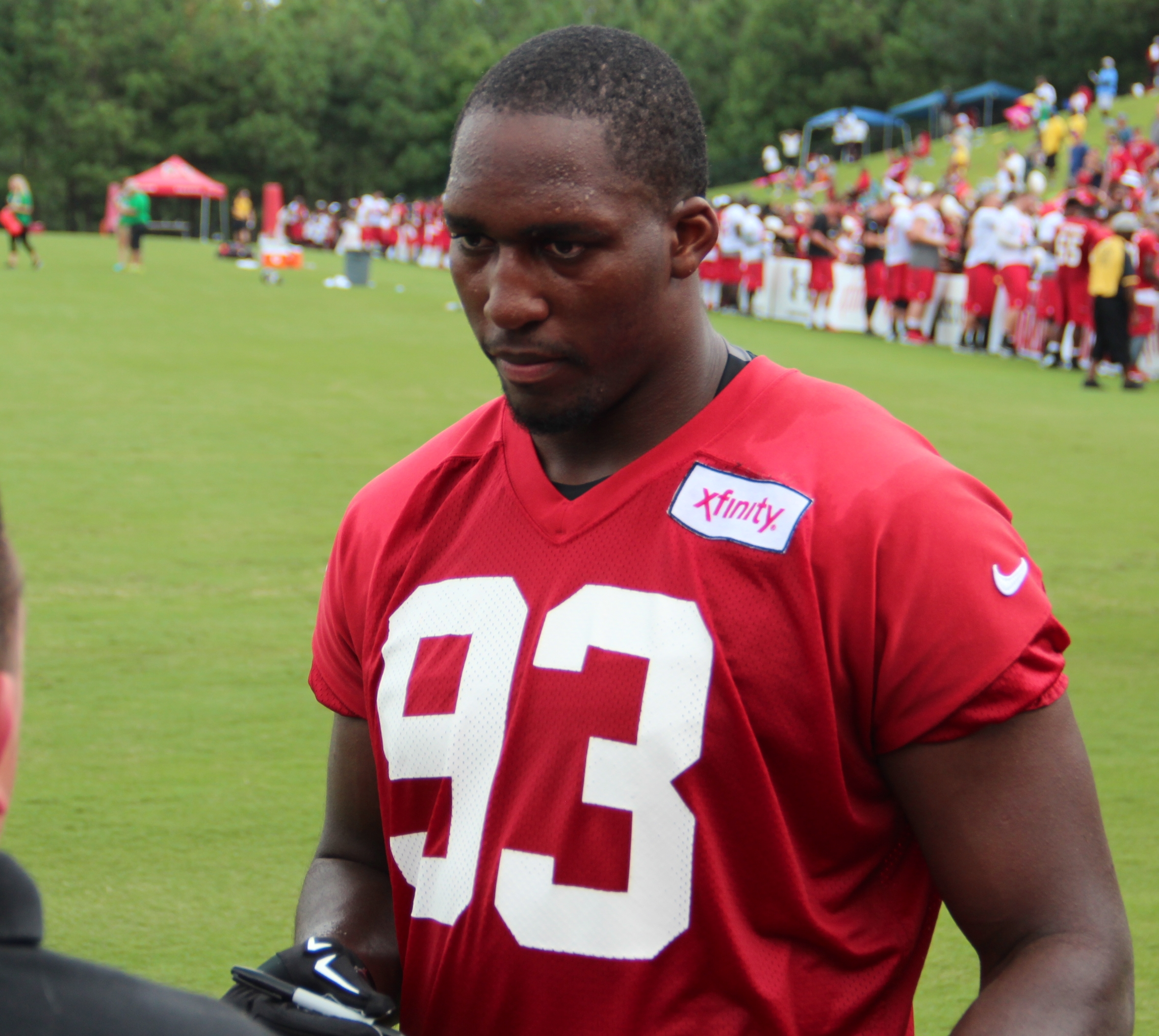
- Goodman with the Atlanta Falcons in 2015

No. 93, 97, 54
- Position: Defensive end

Personal information
- Born: January 4, 1990 (age 36); Florence, South Carolina, U.S.
- Listed height: 6 ft 4 in (1.93 m)
- Listed weight: 276 lb (125 kg)

Career information
- High school: West Florence
- College: Clemson
- NFL draft: 2013: 4th round, 127th overall pick

Career history
- Atlanta Falcons (2013–2015); Seattle Seahawks (2016); Atlanta Falcons (2016); Jacksonville Jaguars (2017)*
- * Offseason or practice squad member only

Career NFL statistics
- Total tackles: 29
- Forced fumbles: 2
- Fumble recoveries: 2
- Stats at Pro Football Reference

Malliciah Goodman (born January 4, 1990) is an American former professional football player who was a defensive end in the National Football League (NFL). He played college football for the Clemson Tigers, and was selected by the Atlanta Falcons in the fourth round of the 2013 NFL draft.

== Early life ==
Goodman was born in Florence, South Carolina. He attended West Florence High School, and played for the West Florence Knights high school football team. He had a productive senior season with 73 tackles, 27 tackles for loss, and 15 sacks in nine games, and was a finalist for Mr. Football in South Carolina. He participated in the 2009 U.S. Army All-American Bowl in San Antonio, Texas.

Rated a four-star recruit by Rivals.com, he was rated the second best strong side defensive end in the nation. He accepted a scholarship offer from Clemson University over offers from Maryland, South Carolina, Tennessee, and Virginia. He was also active in his local Boy Scout troop, achieving the rank of Life Scout.

== College career ==
Following his high school graduation in December 2008, Goodman enrolled in Clemson University in January 2009, and immediately began practice with the Clemson Tigers football team. During his college career, he amassed 150 tackles, 21.5 tackles for a loss, 12 quarterback sacks, 35 quarterback pressures, three pass breakups, eight forced fumbles, and one recovered fumble, in 2,061 snaps over 54 games (28 starts) in his career. He is tied for second in school history in games played and tied for third in forced fumbles. He graduated from Clemson prior to joining the NFL.

== Professional career ==
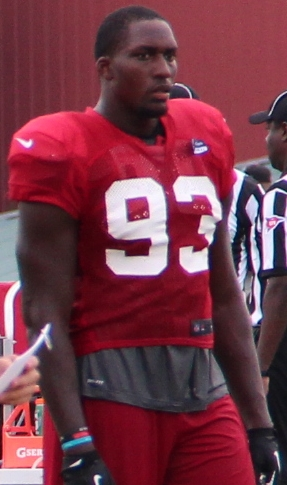
Goodman with the Falcons in 2013

=== Atlanta Falcons (first stint) ===
Goodman was selected by the Atlanta Falcons in the fourth round, with the 127th pick overall, of the 2013 NFL draft. The Falcons announced he signed his rookie contract on May 17, 2013.

On September 3, 2016, Goodman was waived by the Falcons due to final roster cuts.

=== Seattle Seahawks ===
On October 25, 2016, Goodman was signed by the Seahawks. He was released by the Seahawks on November 1, 2016.

=== Atlanta Falcons (second stint) ===
On December 6, 2016, Goodman was re-signed by the Falcons. He was released by the team on December 22, 2016.

=== Jacksonville Jaguars ===
On March 24, 2017, Goodman signed with the Jacksonville Jaguars. He was released by the team on September 2, 2017.
