= Morgan Burnett =

American football player and coach (born 1989)

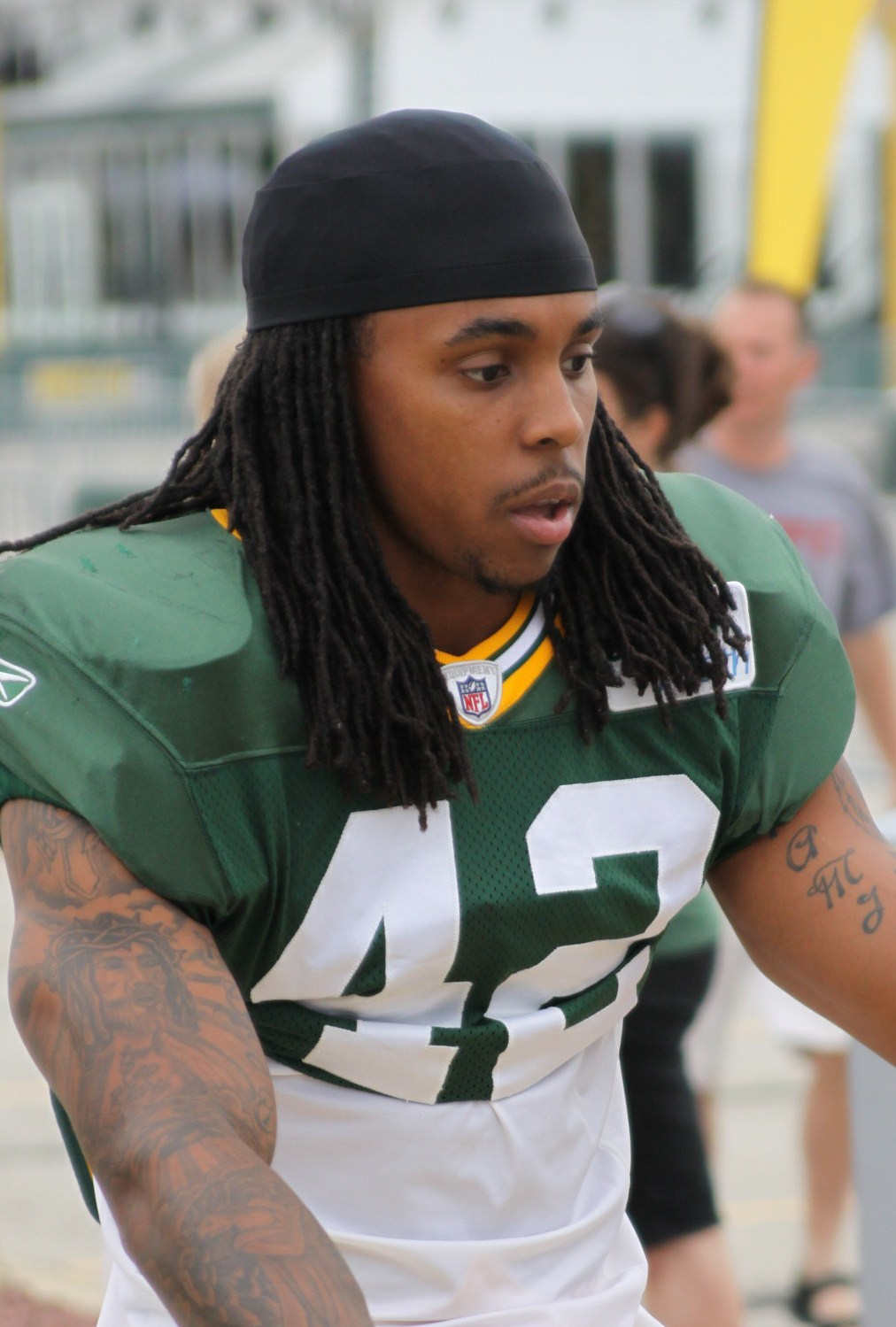
- Burnett with the Green Bay Packers in 2011

No. 42
- Position: Safety

Personal information
- Born: January 13, 1989 (age 37); East Point, Georgia, U.S.
- Listed height: 6 ft 1 in (1.85 m)
- Listed weight: 210 lb (95 kg)

Career information
- High school: North Clayton (College Park, Georgia)
- College: Georgia Tech (2007–2009)
- NFL draft: 2010: 3rd round, 71st overall pick

Career history
- Green Bay Packers (2010–2017); Pittsburgh Steelers (2018); Cleveland Browns (2019)

Awards and highlights
- Super Bowl champion (XLV); First-team All-American (2008); Second-team All-American (2009); 2× Second-team All-ACC (2008, 2009)

Career NFL statistics
- Tackles: 770
- Pass deflections: 52
- Interceptions: 10
- Forced fumbles: 8
- Sacks: 9.5
- Stats at Pro Football Reference

Morgan Mark Burnett (born January 13, 1989) is an American former professional football player who was a safety in the National Football League (NFL). He played college football for the Georgia Tech Yellow Jackets and was selected by the Green Bay Packers in the third round of the 2010 NFL draft. He also played for the Pittsburgh Steelers and Cleveland Browns.

== Early life ==
A native of College Park, Georgia, Burnett attended North Clayton High School, where he played for the North Clayton Eagles high school football team. He was named Class AAAA first-team all-state as a senior after earning honorable mention all-state recognition at quarterback as a sophomore. He made 135 tackles as a senior and six interceptions including three that he returned for touchdowns.

Burnett was also a four-year letterman in track & field, where he was one of the states top performers in the triple jump. He got a personal-best leap of 47 ft, 12 in (14.61 meters) in the triple jump. He also competed in the long jump, 400-meters and relays.

Considered a four-star recruit by Rivals.com, Burnett ranked seventh among safety prospects nationwide. He was offered athletic scholarship by a number of high-major schools, including Alabama, Florida, South Carolina, and Georgia, before choosing to attend Georgia Tech on January 10, 2007.

== College career ==
As a freshman, Burnett played in all 13 games and started against UNC. He subbed at safety and came in on the nickel package all season. Burnett led the team in interceptions (3) and ranked fifth on the team in tackles (57, 37 solo). He subsequently earned ACC All-Freshman team by Sporting News.

As a sophomore in 2008, Burnett started all 13 games for the Yellow Jackets. He recorded 93 tackles, of which 62 were solo. Burnett also had seven interceptions and returned them for 95 yards. In the season opener vs. Jacksonville State, he picked off two Ryan Perrilloux passes, returning one of them 47 yards. Later in the season, he picked off a Matthew Stafford pass and returned it 35 yards for his first career touchdown at Georgia. Burnett was named to a number of All-ACC and All-American teams, including Pro Football Weekly's 2008 All-America first-team.

On January 11, 2010, Burnett announced he would enter his name in the 2010 NFL draft and forgo his senior season.

== Professional career ==
Pre-draft measurables
Height	Weight	Arm length	Hand span	40-yard dash	10-yard split	20-yard split	20-yard shuttle	Three-cone drill	Vertical jump	Broad jump	Bench press	Wonderlic
6 ft 1 3/8 in (1.86 m)	209 lb (95 kg)	31 3/4 in (0.81 m)	9 in (0.23 m)	4.51 s	1.57 s	2.56 s	3.92 s	6.87 s	39.5 in (1.00 m)	11 ft 8 in (3.56 m)	16 reps	14
All values from NFL Combine/Georgia Tech's Pro Day

=== Green Bay Packers ===
The Green Bay Packers selected Burnett in the third round (71st overall) of the 2010 NFL draft. The Packers acquired the 71st overall pick to draft Burnett after trading with the Philadelphia Eagles their third (86th overall) and fourth round (122nd overall) picks. He was the sixth safety selected in 2010.

==== 2010 ====
On July 17, 2010, the Green Bay Packers signed Burnett to a four-year, $3.50 million contract that includes a signing bonus of $875,100.

Burnett entered training camp competing for the job as the starting strong safety against veterans Atari Bigby and Charlie Peprah. He progressed quickly and received first-team reps after Bigby held out due to a contract dispute. Head coach Mike McCarthy named Burnett the starting strong safety to start the regular season, alongside free safety Nick Collins.

He started the Green Bay Packers' season-opener at the Philadelphia Eagles and recorded two solo tackles during their 27–20 victory. The following week, Burnett recorded a season-high five combined tackles, deflected a pass, and made his first career interception off of a pass by quarterback Trent Edwards in their 34–7 victory over the Buffalo Bills. In Week 4, Burnett made three solo tackles before leaving the 28–26 win against the Detroit Lions in the second quarter after suffering an injury. The next day, it was discovered that Burnett had torn his ACL and was placed on injured reserve three days later for the remainder of the season. Burnett finished his rookie season with 14 combined tackles (12 solo), one pass deflection, and an interception in four games and four starts. The Packers finished the 2010 season second in the NFC North with a 10–6 record and went on to win Super Bowl XLV after defeating the Pittsburgh Steelers 31–25.

==== 2011 ====
Burnett returned as the de facto starting strong safety in 2011 after Atari Bigby departed in free agency. He started the Green Bay Packers' season-opener against the New Orleans Saints and collected a career-high 14 combined tackles (seven solo) during a 42–34 victory. The following week, he collected eight solo tackles, two pass deflections, an interception, and made his first career sack on quarterback Cam Newton in the Packers' 30–23 victory at the Carolina Panthers. In Week 3, Burnett made six combined tackles, two pass deflections, and intercepted two pass attempts by quarterback Jay Cutler during a 27–17 victory at the Chicago Bears. It marked Burnett's first career multi-interception game. On December 11, 2011, Burnett recorded a season-high ten solo tackles as they routed the Oakland Raiders 46–16. He finished the 2011 season with 107 combined tackles (78 solo), a career-high 11 pass deflections, three interceptions, and a sack in 16 games and 16 starts.

The Packers finished first in the NFC North 15–1 record and secured a playoff berth and a first round bye. On January 15, 2012, Burnett started his first career playoff game and recorded four combined tackles, two pass deflections, and intercepted a pass by Eli Manning as the Packers lost 37–20 to the eventual Super Bowl XLVI Champions the New York Giants in NFC Divisional round.

==== 2012 ====
Defensive coordinator Dom Capers opted to move Burnett to free safety after the Packers moved cornerback Charles Woodson to strong safety due to the release of Nick Collins after he suffered a severe neck injury in 2011.

On September 30, 2012, Burnett recorded a season-high 14 combined tackles (eight solo) and deflected a pass during a 28–27 victory against the New Orleans Saints. In Week 8, he collected 11 combined tackles and sacked Blaine Gabbert in the Packers' 24–15 win against the Jacksonville Jaguars. On December 2, 2012, Burnett made seven combined tackles, three pass deflections, and intercepted two pass attempts by Christian Ponder during a 23–14 victory against the Minnesota Vikings in Week 13. He finished the 2012 season with a 123 combined tackles (88 solo), five pass deflections, two interceptions, and two sacks in 16 games and 16 starts. He was one of two defensive players in the NFL to play every snap in every game in the season, along with James Laurinaitis of the St. Louis Rams. Pro Football Focus graded him out as the 16th best safety in 2012.

==== 2013 ====
On July 15, 2013, the Green Bay Packers signed Burnett to a four-year, $24.75 million contract extension that includes a signing bonus of $8.25 million.

Head coach Mike McCarthy named Burnett the starting free safety, alongside M. D. Jennings, who replaced Charles Woodson after his departure to the Oakland Raiders. On August 23, 2013, Burnett made one tackle before leaving the Packers' third preseason game against the Seattle Seahawks with a hamstring injury. The injury sidelined him for the first three games of the regular season (Weeks 1–3). In Week 11, Burnett recorded a season-high 12 combined tackles (six solo) during a 27–13 loss at the New York Giants. The following week, he had a season-high eight solo tackles and four assisted tackles in the Packers' 26–26 overtime tie with the Minnesota Vikings. He finished the 2013 season with 96 combined tackles (60 solo) and six pass deflections in 13 games and 13 starts. The Packers finished first in their division with an 8-7-1 record, but were eliminated after losing in the NFC Wild Card game for the second consecutive season. Burnett recorded six solo tackles in their 23–20 loss to the San Francisco 49ers.

==== 2014 ====
During the off-season, the Green Bay Packers opted to not resign M. D. Jennings and moved Burnett back to strong safety in his place. Head coach Mike McCarthy named him the starting strong safety, along with free safety Micah Hyde, to begin the 2014 regular season.

In Week 4, Burnett recorded a season-high 13 combined tackles during a 38–17 victory at the Chicago Bears. He missed the Packers' Week 8 loss at the New Orleans Saints after suffering a calf injury. He returned in Week 11 and recorded six combined tackles, a pass deflection, and sacked Jay Cutler during the Packers' 55–14 win against the Chicago Bears. On December 8, 2014, he collected eight combined tackles, broke up a pass, and intercepted a pass by Matt Ryan during a 43–37 win over the Atlanta Falcons. He finished the 2014 season with a career-high 130 combined tackles (94 solo), four pass deflections, 1.5 sacks, and an interception in 15 games and 15 starts. His 130 combined tackles led the team and all defensive backs in the league. On January 18, 2015, Burnett collected ten combined tackles (eight solo), a pass deflection, an interception, and sacked Russell Wilson in a 28–22 loss at the Seattle Seahawks.

==== 2015 ====
Head coach Mike McCarthy named Burnett the starting strong safety to start the regular season, opposite HaHa Clinton-Dix. On August 29, 2015, Burnett recorded four solo tackles before leaving the Packers' 39–26 loss to the Philadelphia Eagles in the third preseason game due to a calf injury. He was inactive for the Packers' season-opening 31–23 victory at the Chicago Bears. In Week 3, he recorded three solo tackles during a 27–17 win against the Seattle Seahawks and went on to miss the next four games (Weeks 3–6) after aggravating his calf injury. On December 20, 2015, Burnett recorded eight combined tackles and a season-high three pass deflections in a 30–20 win at the Oakland Raiders. The following week, he collected a season-high ten combined tackles (eight solo) and broke up a pass as the Packers were routed 38–8 at the Arizona Cardinals. He finished his sixth season in 2015 season with 68 combined tackles (47 solo) and five pass deflections in 11 games and 11 starts. Pro Football Focus ranked him the fourth highest graded safety in 2015 with an overall grade of 88.5 and gave him a coverage grade of 81.2. Burnett was also ranked the third best strong safety in 2015 by Sports Illustrated.

==== 2016 ====
He started the Green Bay Packers' season-opener at the Jacksonville Jaguars and recorded a season-high eight solo tackles, an assisted tackle, and sacked quarterback Blake Bortles during a 27–23 victory. Burnett was inactive for the Packers' Week 3 victory at the Detroit Lions due to a groin injury he sustained the previous week. On October 16, 2016, Burnett collected a season-high ten combined tackles, deflected two passes, and intercepted a pass by Dallas Cowboys' quarterback Dak Prescott in their 30–16 loss. He finished the 2016 season with 93 combined tackles (70 solo), nine pass deflections, three sacks, and two interceptions in 15 games and 15 starts. He received an overall grade of 84.0 from Pro Football Focus, ranking 15th among all qualified safeties in 2016.

==== 2017 ====
In Week 4, Burnett recorded a season-high nine combined tackles during a 35–14 victory over the Chicago Bears. He missed two consecutive games (Weeks 6–7) after sustaining a hamstring injury. On November 6, 2017, he made five combined tackles during a 30–17 loss to the Detroit Lions before leaving in the fourth quarter after sustaining a groin injury. The injury sidelined him for the next two games (Weeks 10–11). He returned in Week 12 and made a season-high nine solo tackles during a 31–28 loss at the Pittsburgh Steelers. He finished the 2017 season with 68 combined tackles (48 solo) and three pass deflections in 12 games and 12 starts. Pro Football Focus gave Burnett an overall grade of 77.2, which ranked 51st among all qualifying safeties in 2017.

=== Pittsburgh Steelers ===
On March 20, 2018, the Pittsburgh Steelers signed Burnett to a three-year, $14.35 million contract that includes a signing bonus of $4.25 million.

On April 1, 2019, Burnett was released by the Steelers.

=== Cleveland Browns ===
On April 5, 2019, Burnett signed a two-year contract with the Cleveland Browns. In week 11 against the Pittsburgh Steelers, Burnett intercepted a pass thrown by former teammate Mason Rudolph before tearing his Achilles in the 21–7 win. After the game, Burnett was ruled out for the season. He finished the season starting eight games, recording 41 tackles, two passes defensed, an interception, and two sacks. On March 16, 2020, Burnett was released by the Browns.

After a year off, Burnett announced his retirement from professional football on March 29, 2021. He retired as a Green Bay Packer on August 30, 2022.

== Coaching career ==
On April 14, 2022, Burnett was hired by Walton High School on a multi-year contract for an undisclosed sum. Burnett officially begun his coaching duties as the Freshmen team's defensive coordinator on May 1, 2022.

== NFL career statistics ==
=== Regular season ===
Year	Team	Games		Tackles					
Year	Team	GP	GS	Comb	Solo	Ast	Sck	PD	Int
2010	GB	4	4	14	12	2	0.0	1	1
2011	GB	16	16	107	78	29	1.0	11	3
2012	GB	16	16	123	88	35	2.0	5	2
2013	GB	13	13	96	60	36	0.0	6	0
2014	GB	15	15	130	94	36	1.5	4	1
2015	GB	11	11	68	47	21	0.0	5	0
2016	GB	15	15	93	70	23	3.0	9	2
2017	GB	12	12	68	48	20	0.0	3	0
2018	PIT	11	2	30	17	13	0.0	6	0
2019	CLE	8	8	41	26	15	2.0	2	1
Total		121	112	770	540	230	9.5	52	10
Source: NFL.com

=== Postseason ===
Year	Team	Games		Tackles					
Year	Team	GP	GS	Comb	Solo	Ast	Sck	PD	Int
2011	GB	1	1	4	3	1	0.0	2	1
2012	GB	2	2	10	7	3	0.0	1	0
2013	GB	1	1	6	6	0	0.0	0	0
2014	GB	2	2	14	11	3	2.0	1	1
2015	GB	2	2	15	9	6	0.0	0	0
2016	GB	3	3	15	11	4	0.0	1	0
Total		11	11	64	47	17	2.0	5	2
Source: pro-reference.com

== Personal life ==
Burnett was raised by his parents, Cap and Ellary Burnett, in College Park, Georgia. His older brother, Cap Burnett Jr., played college football for the Georgia Bulldogs (1999-2002) and is currently the head coach of North Clayton High School's football team. His father played college football for the Memphis Tigers and had a minor stint with the Memphis Showboats of the USFL. Burnett's father died in 2015 from a heart attack. He also holds the Morgan Burnett Football Camp, which is an annual free youth football camp held in Riverside, Colquitt County, Georgia for children 6-14. He grew up as a fan of the Atlanta Falcons.

Nicolette Aaron and Burnett established the Burnett Family Foundation which holds an annual turkey drive to aide families and give them the necessities to have a Thanksgiving dinner. They currently reside in Marietta, Georgia with their three children; a daughter and two sons named Morgan Jr. and Logan. Morgan Jr. is currently committed to play at Georgia Tech.
