= Luther Robinson =

American football player (born 1991)

No. 97
- Position: Defensive end

Personal information
- Born: February 24, 1991 (age 35); Fort Pierce, Florida, U.S.
- Listed height: 6 ft 3 in (1.91 m)
- Listed weight: 301 lb (137 kg)

Career information
- High school: Westwood (Fort Pierce)
- College: Miami (FL)
- NFL draft: 2014: undrafted

Career history
- Green Bay Packers (2014); San Diego Chargers (2015)*
- * Offseason or practice squad member only

Career NFL statistics
- Tackles: 2
- Stats at Pro Football Reference

Luther Robinson (born February 24, 1991) is an American former professional football player who was a defensive end for the Green Bay Packers of the National Football League (NFL). He played college football for the Miami Hurricanes.

== Early life ==
Robinson played high school football at Fort Pierce Westwood High School in Fort Pierce, Florida. He recorded 90 tackles, 14 sacks, one interception, 10 forced fumbles and three fumble recoveries his senior year, earning all-area first-team defense honors. Khalil Mack, Robinson's cousin, played football with him on the Panthers.

== College career ==
Robinson played at the University of Miami from 2010 to 2013 for the Hurricanes. He was redshirted in 2009.

== Professional career ==
Robinson was signed by the Green Bay Packers on May 19, 2014 after going undrafted in the 2014 NFL draft. He was released by the Packers on August 30, 2014. He was signed to the Packers' practice squad on September 1, 2014. Robinson was promoted to the active roster on October 2, 2014 and made his NFL debut the same day against the Minnesota Vikings. He was released by the Packers on May 11, 2015.

Robinson signed with the San Diego Chargers on August 3, 2015. He was released by the Chargers on August 30, 2015.

=== Statistics ===
Source: NFL.com

Year	Team	G	GS	Tackles					Interceptions						Fumbles	
Year	Team	G	GS	Total	Solo	Ast	Sck	SFTY	PDef	Int	Yds	Avg	Lng	TDs	FF	FR
Regular season
2014	GB	5	0	2	1	1	0.0	0	1	0	0	0.0	0	0	0	0
Total		5	0	2	1	1	0.0	0	1	0	0	0.0	0	0	0	0
