= Kevin Dorsey =

American football player (born 1990)

No. 13
- Position: Wide receiver

Personal information
- Born: February 23, 1990 (age 36); Forestville, Maryland, U.S.
- Listed height: 6 ft 1 in (1.85 m)
- Listed weight: 207 lb (94 kg)

Career information
- High school: Forestville Military Academy
- College: Maryland
- NFL draft: 2013: 7th round, 224th overall pick

Career history
- Green Bay Packers (2013–2014); New England Patriots (2015)*
- * Offseason or practice squad member only

Career NFL statistics
- Receptions: 1
- Receiving yards: 4
- Stats at Pro Football Reference

Kevin Dorsey (born February 23, 1990) is an American former professional football player who was a wide receiver in the National Football League (NFL). He played college football for the Maryland Terrapins, and was selected by the Green Bay Packers in the seventh round of the 2013 NFL draft.

== Early life ==
Dorsey was born in Prince George's County, Maryland, and attended Forestville Military Academy outside of Washington, D.C. During his time at the academy, he played a number of positions including quarterback, wide receiver, cornerback, and safety. During his junior year, he had 1,025 receiving yards and 13 touchdowns; he finished with four interceptions on the defensive side of the ball. He continued to improve during his senior year, being a key contributor to the team as they advanced to the Division 1A South Region playoffs. He caught 50 passes for 902 yards and 11 touchdowns; on defense, he intercepted seven passes. Additionally, he also scored a touchdown on a kickoff return and an interception return. Dorsey was named to The Washington Post's All-Metropolitan Team, which he has described as one of the biggest honors of his career.

== College career ==
Dorsey was ranked as a four-star prospect by both Rivals.Com and Scout.com. His strengths at his position included good body control, speed and elusiveness. His weaknesses involved a lack of strength and an inability to block effectively. He was ranked as the third best receiver in Maryland and 19th at his position by Rivals, while Scouts listed him as the 25th best receiver in the nation. He received scholarship offers from Maryland, Connecticut, and Marshall before signing at Maryland.

Dorsey was redshirted his first year at the University of Maryland, College Park, with the Huskies after having surgery for a foot injury he suffered in August. He used this time to finish high school and enroll early into the college. As a redshirt freshman, Dorsey played in all 12 games of the season primarily on special teams and played occasionally at wide receiver. He had his longest catch of the year on a 13-yard reception against the Virginia Tech Hokies

Dorsey began to see an expanded role on the Terrapins offense in 2010, seeing the first start of his college career. During the game against the Miami Hurricanes, Dorsey had his best game of the season with three catches for 63 yards and the first touchdown of his career coming on a 42-yard throw. He recorded one more touchdown on the year in the Military Bowl against East Carolina. At the end of the year, he ranked fourth on the team with 14 receptions and was tied for third with two touchdowns.

Dorsey became the number one receiver for the team and had ten starts on the 2011 season, missing only two games due to a hamstring injury. During the first game of the season, he began what was arguably his breakout year with eight catches for a career-high 124 yards. The next week against the West Virginia Mountaineers, he had nine catches for 79 yards averaging 8.8 yards and one touchdown. At the end of the season, he led the Terrapins in receiving yards, receiving touchdowns, receptions, and yards per catch.

In his final year with Maryland, Dorsey experienced a dip in his statistics. However, he still led the team with 17.3 yards per reception in 2012, and he played in all 12 games of the season. In a game against the Florida State Seminoles he recorded two touchdown passes in a single game, the highest in his career. He was also awarded the A. V. Williams Award, for displaying outstanding and conspicuous sportsmanship throughout the 2012 season.

== Professional career ==
=== Pre-draft ===
Dorsey was not invited to the NFL Combine and was not expected to be drafted. He made a visit to the Green Bay Packers in March and stated that he "fell in love" with the team's unity and planned to sign there if he went undrafted.

Pre-draft measurables
Height	Weight	40-yard dash	10-yard split	20-yard split	20-yard shuttle	Three-cone drill	Vertical jump	Broad jump	Bench press	Wonderlic
6 ft 1 in (1.85 m)	207 lb (94 kg)	4.47 s	1.65 s	2.63 s	4.28 s	7.08 s	38 in (0.97 m)	10 ft 10 in (3.30 m)	17 reps	22
All results from Maryland Terrapins Pro Day.

=== Green Bay Packers ===
Dorsey was selected with the 18th pick in the seventh round (224th overall) of the 2013 NFL draft. On August 27, 2013, Dorsey was placed on injured reserve list with a toe injury and remained there for the entire 2013 season.

In 2014, Dorsey spent the first five weeks of the season on the practice squad. On October 6, 2014, the Packers signed Dorsey to the active roster, to make room for him, tight end Ryan Taylor was released. At the same time his uniform number was switched from No. 6 to 13. Dorsey saw his first NFL action on October 12, 2014, in a 27–14 victory against the Miami Dolphins. Dorsey would go on to play in a total of three games during the 2014 season. On November 8, 2014, Dorsey was placed on the injured reserve list after he suffered a foot injury during practice. On February 17, 2015, Dorsey was released by the Packers.

=== New England Patriots ===
On March 11, 2015, Dorsey was signed by the New England Patriots. He was released on May 7, 2015.

== Career statistics ==
Season	Team	Games		Receiving				
Season	Team	GP	GS	Rec	Yds	Avg	Lng	TD
2014	Green Bay Packers	3	0	1	4	4	4	0
	Total	3	0	1	4	4	4	0
