= West Florence High School =

Coordinates: 34.1948772°N 79.8239521°W

Location
- 221 N. Beltline Drive; Florence, South Carolina 29501; United States

Information
- Type: Public secondary
- Established: 1970 (56 years ago)
- School district: Florence Public School District 1
- Principal: April Leroy
- Teaching staff: 105.50 (FTE)
- Grades: 9–12
- Enrollment: 1,827 (2024–2025)
- Student to teacher ratio: 17.32
- Colors: Green and gold
- Athletics conference: SCHSL Region 6, 5A
- Mascot: Knight
- Website: westflorence.f1s.org

West Florence High School is a public secondary school serving grades 9 through 12 in Florence, South Carolina, United States. The school is located on the city's west side, near the intersection of Interstates 20 and 95.

== History ==
West Florence High School was founded in Fall 1970.

In 2020, Governor Henry McMaster delivered the commencement address at the school's graduation ceremony amid the COVID-19 pandemic. Following his address, he sang Mull of Kintyre while playing his guitar.

== Band ==
On March 3, 2010, Lord Mayor of Westminster Duncan Sandys presented a formal invitation to West Florence High School Director of Bands Steve Rummage, requesting that the West Florence Marching Knights participate and perform in the city of London's 2012 New Year's Day Parade. This parade was designated as the first official event of the 2012 Olympics, hosted in London. Because of this honor, the South Carolina State Legislature introduced and adopted Senate Resolution 712, to honor and congratulate the West Florence Knights Marching Band.

== Notable alumni ==
- Akeem Bostick – Major League Baseball (MLB) pitcher
- Brandon Bostick – National Football League (NFL) tight end
- Malliciah Goodman – NFL defensive end
- Mark L. Walberg – television host
