= Letroy Guion =

American football player (born 1987)

No. 98
- Position: Defensive tackle

Personal information
- Born: June 21, 1987 (age 39); Gainesville, Florida, U.S.
- Listed height: 6 ft 4 in (1.93 m)
- Listed weight: 322 lb (146 kg)

Career information
- High school: Bradford (Starke, Florida)
- College: Florida State
- NFL draft: 2008: 5th round, 152nd overall pick

Career history
- Minnesota Vikings (2008–2013); Green Bay Packers (2014–2016)

Career NFL statistics
- Total tackles: 180
- Sacks: 8.5
- Forced fumbles: 3
- Fumble recoveries: 2
- Stats at Pro Football Reference

Letroy Shelton Guion Jr. (pronounced /ˈɡaɪən/ GHY-ən; born June 21, 1987) is an American former professional football player who was a defensive tackle in the National Football League (NFL). He played college football for the Florida State Seminoles. Guion was selected by the Minnesota Vikings in the fifth round of the 2008 NFL draft. Guion also played for the Green Bay Packers.

== Early life ==
Guion attended Bradford High School in Starke, Florida, and was a student, basketball, shot put and discus thrower, as well as a standout football player. In football, he played on the varsity team for four years while starting three and helped lead his team to the state semifinals in each of his last three years. In both his junior and senior season he was an all-state first-team and all-area selection. As a senior, he totaled 131 tackles, 21 tackles for minus yardage, 12 sacks, and forced 11 fumbles.

He chose Florida State over Georgia, Tennessee, and Iowa.

== College career ==
In his true freshman year at Florida State University, Guion appeared in ten games as a back-up defensive tackle, and totaled 10 tackles and one quarterback hurry on the season. Five of those, including 1.5 for loss, came in his only start of the season, when he replaced Andre Fluellen against The Citadel. Guion was the only true freshman to earn a start on defense during the 2005 season.

As a sophomore, Guion played in 12 of the Seminoles' 13 games and started five games (Virginia, Wake Forest, Western Michigan, Florida, UCLA) at defensive tackle. He finished 11th on the team with a career-high 25 tackles including a career-high four tackles for minus yardage. 24 of his 25 tackles came in the final seven games.

As a junior, Guion earned eight midseason starting assignments at left defensive tackle, replacing an injured Fluellen in the lineup. He finished ninth on the team with 31 tackles (17 solos), including a sack and 6.5 stops behind the line of scrimmage. He also broke up one pass and recovered two fumbles. Guion missed the Music City Bowl due to suspension; he was part of the school's academic cheating scandal that saw 36 football players ruled ineligible for postseason action.

== Professional career ==
After starting just 14 games during his three years with the Seminoles, Guion announced that he would forgo his senior season and declare for the 2008 NFL draft. Described as “a solid developmental prospect who should get consideration in the late rounds” by Sports Illustrated, Guion was projected to be a middle-seventh round pick.

Pre-draft measurables
Height	Weight	Arm length	Hand span	40-yard dash	10-yard split	20-yard split	20-yard shuttle	Three-cone drill	Vertical jump	Broad jump	Bench press
6 ft 3 3/8 in (1.91 m)	303 lb (137 kg)	34 7/8 in (0.89 m)	9 3/4 in (0.25 m)	5.20 s	1.79 s	2.96 s	4.50 s	7.41 s	30.0 in (0.76 m)	8 ft 10 in (2.69 m)	26 reps
All values from NFL Combine/Pro Day

=== Minnesota Vikings ===
Guion was selected in the fifth round (152nd overall) by the Minnesota Vikings in the 2008 NFL draft. As a rookie in 2008, Guion played 2 games without recording a stat. In 2009, he played 7 games with 1 tackle and a pass defended. In 2010, he appeared in 15 games with 16 tackles, 2 sacks, and 1 forced fumble. In 2011, he appeared in all 16 games with 3 starts making 20 tackles and 1 fumble recovery. In 2012, he started 15 games with 31 tackles, 2 sacks, and 1 pass defended. In 2013, he started 13 games with 21 tackles, 1 sack, 1 pass defended, 1 forced fumble, and 1 fumble recovery.

=== Green Bay Packers ===
Guion signed with the Green Bay Packers on March 17, 2014. The contract was for 1 year, with a base salary of $730,000. It included a signing bonus of $100,000, roster bonus of $105,000 and a workout bonus of $50,000, for a cap hit of $985,000.

With B. J. Raji going down with a torn biceps in training camp, Guion made the most of his opportunity at the nose tackle position. He finished the 2014 season with a career high 3.5 sacks, 32 tackles, two forced fumbles and one batted pass. Packers coach Mike McCarthy spoke highly of Guion after the week 17 victory over the Detroit Lions. McCarthy stated that "I think Letroy has been everything we thought he was going to be. I've always had a lot of respect for Letroy in Minnesota. I think he's come over to us, and I think he's taken his game up a notch. He's an excellent fit in the locker room, teammates love him, he's an excellent teammate, and he's a damn good football player."

On March 30, 2015, Guion signed a one-year contract worth $2.75 million with $500,000 worth of incentives.

On July 23, 2015, the NFL suspended Guion for the first three regular season games. In the 2015 season, he appeared in 13 games and made 20 tackles.

Guion re-signed with the Packers on February 12, 2016. He started 15 games in 2016 recording 30 tackles and one pass defensed.

On March 7, 2017, Guion was suspended for the first four games of the 2017 season. On August 8, 2017, Guion was released by the Packers.

== NFL career statistics ==
=== Regular season ===
Year	Team	G	GS	Tackles					Interceptions						Fumbles	
Year	Team	G	GS	Total	Solo	Ast	Sck	SFTY	PDef	Int	Yds	Avg	Lng	TDs	FF	FR
2008	MIN	2	0	0	0	0	0.0	0	0	0	0	0.0	0	0	0	0
2009	MIN	7	0	1	1	0	0.0	0	1	0	0	0.0	0	0	0	0
2010	MIN	15	0	16	12	4	2.0	0	0	0	0	0.0	0	0	1	0
2011	MIN	16	3	21	14	7	0.0	0	0	0	0	0.0	0	0	0	1
2012	MIN	15	15	31	16	15	2.0	0	1	0	0	0.0	0	0	0	0
2013	MIN	13	13	21	10	11	1.0	0	1	0	0	0.0	0	0	1	1
2014	GB	16	16	32	22	10	3.5	0	1	0	0	0.0	0	0	1	0
2015	GB	13	4	21	13	8	0.0	0	0	0	0	0.0	0	0	0	0
2016	GB	15	15	30	20	10	0.0	0	1	0	0	0.0	0	0	0	0
Total		112	66	173	108	65	8.5	0	5	0	0	0.0	0	0	3	2
Source: NFL.com

=== Postseason ===
Year	Team	G	GS	Tackles					Interceptions						Fumbles	
Year	Team	G	GS	Total	Solo	Ast	Sck	SFTY	PDef	Int	Yds	Avg	Lng	TDs	FF	FR
2012	MIN	1	1	4	4	0	0.0	0	1	0	0	0.0	0	0	0	0
2014	GB	2	2	9	5	4	0.5	0	0	0	0	0.0	0	0	0	0
2015	GB	2	0	3	2	1	0.0	0	0	0	0	0.0	0	0	0	0
2016	GB	3	3	4	1	3	0.0	0	0	0	0	0.0	0	0	0	0
Total		8	6	20	12	8	0.5	0	1	0	0	0.0	0	0	0	0
Source: pro-football-reference.com

== Personal life ==
Guion is a cousin of former Buffalo Bills linebacker Sam Barrington.

== Legal issues ==
At 11:00 PM on February 3, 2015, Guion was driving in Starke, Florida when he was pulled over by police after his vehicle was observed to not be staying in its lane properly. It was discovered that Guion was in possession of 357 grams of marijuana, $190,000 in cash, and a 9mm semi-automatic handgun.

On March 24, 2015, Guion reached a plea deal. It included a $5,000 fine plus court costs. Since Guion had no prior record, the charges were dismissed without adjudication of guilt.

On June 21, 2017, Guion was arrested in Waikiki, Hawaii for operating a vehicle under the influence of an intoxicant. He was released from jail on a $500 bond.

On September 26, 2021, Guion was arrested in Green Bay, Wisconsin on charges of substantial battery and disorderly conduct.
