= Jamari Lattimore =

American football player (born 1988)

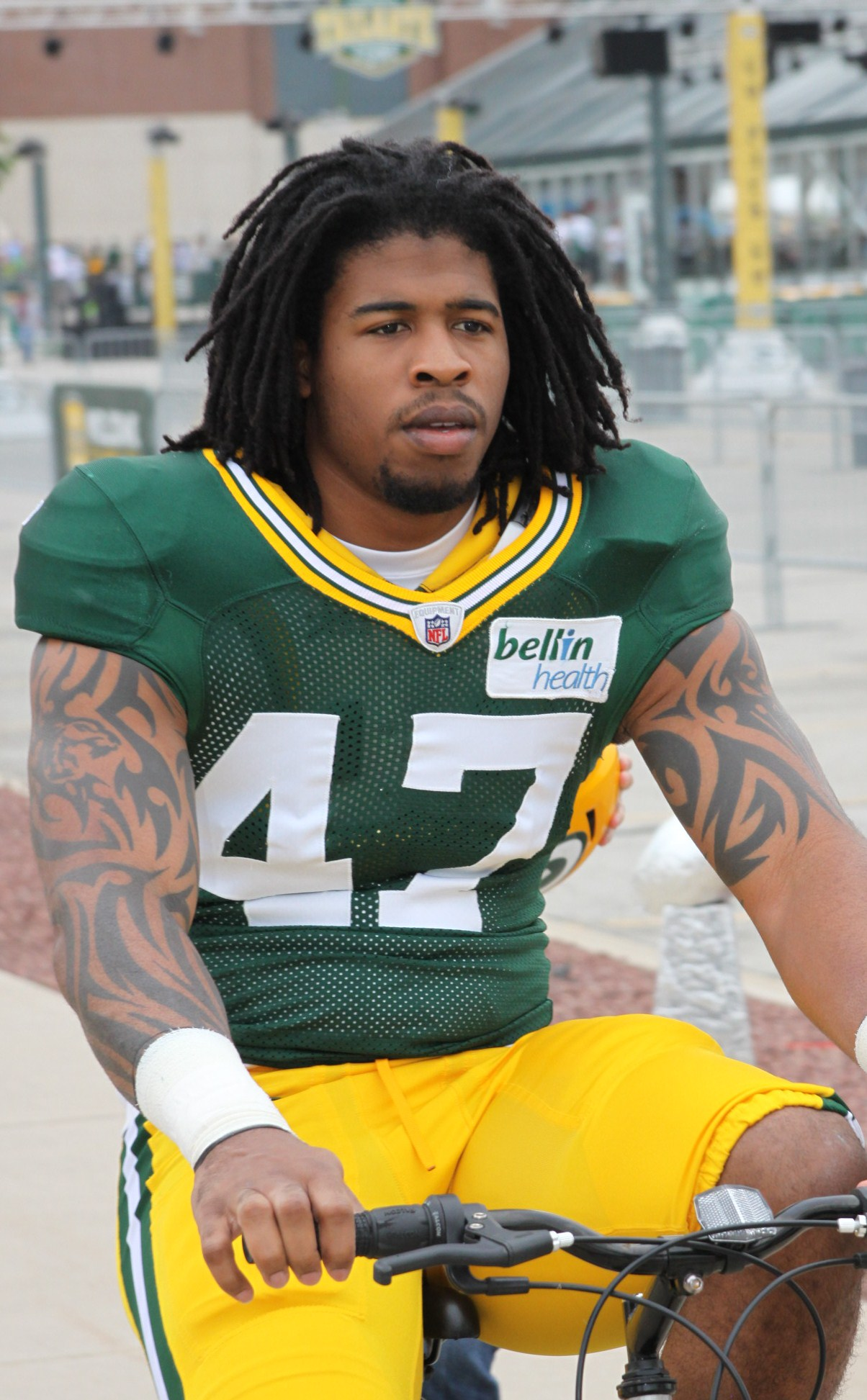
- Lattimore with the Green Bay Packers in 2011

No. 57, 54
- Position: Linebacker

Personal information
- Born: October 6, 1988 (age 38); Miami, Florida, U.S.
- Listed height: 6 ft 2 in (1.88 m)
- Listed weight: 232 lb (105 kg)

Career information
- High school: Hialeah-Miami Lakes (Hialeah, Florida)
- College: Middle Tennessee
- NFL draft: 2011: undrafted

Career history
- Green Bay Packers (2011–2014); New York Jets (2015); Buffalo Bills (2016)*
- * Offseason or practice squad member only

Awards and highlights
- Sun Belt Defensive Player of the Year (2010); First-team All-Sun Belt (2010); Second-team All-Sun Belt (2009)

Career NFL statistics
- Total tackles: 98
- Sacks: 2.0
- Forced fumbles: 1
- Interceptions: 1
- Stats at Pro Football Reference

Jamari Lattimore (born October 6, 1988) is an American former professional football player who was a linebacker in the National Football League (NFL). He played college football for the Middle Tennessee Blue Raiders, and signed with the Green Bay Packers as an undrafted free agent in 2011.

== Early life ==
Lattimore was born in Miami, Florida and attended Hialeah - Miami Lakes High School. While attending the high school he lettered in both track and football where he played Defensive Back, Linebacker, Tackle, Tight End and Wide Receiver. During his time there he earned 64-4A All-Dade honorable mention honors.

== College career ==
=== Dodge City Community College ===
Lattimore spent the first season of his college career at Dodge City Community College, where he had 60 tackles, a team-high nine sacks and an interception. At the end of the year, he received honorable mention all-conference recognition.

After a single season in community college, Lattimore drew little attention with only Middle Tennessee State, University of North Carolina, and Toledo actively recruiting him, but only receiving a scholarship offer from Middle Tennessee State.

=== Middle Tennessee State ===
Lattimore ultimately decided to play for the Blue Raiders. He started out as a linebacker but was then moved to defensive end. During his first season with the team he played in all twelve games and made his first career start against Florida Atlantic University. During his first ever college game he registered his first career tackle against Troy. During a game against North Texas he registered a then career-best two sacks. He ended the year with 22 tackles (5.5 for loss), 3.5 sacks, and broke up two passes

Lattimore continued to improve going into his junior year and started every game for the team. During a game against Maryland, Lattimore tied the school record for most sacks in a game with three and added five sacks and an additional force fumble. He made his first career interception in a game against Louisiana and returned it for a 20-yard touchdown. Lattimore finished the year ranking 16th in the nation in sacks and second in fumble recoveries. He finished the year with 47 tackles (9.5 for loss), along with 5.5 sacks. His performance was recognized and he was awarded second-team All-Sun Belt honors.

In the final year of his college career, Lattimore played in all 13 games, but only started 12 of them. During another game against Louisiana, he broke the team-record for sacks in the game that he tied the previous year with four. When the Blue Raiders played Troy later in the year, he had half a sack and blocked a kick, the first of his college career. He finished his last season with a personal-best 68 tackles (15 of them for a loss) during the season, 10 quarterback hurries, 11.5 sacks, two forced fumbles, two blocked kicks, and a fumble recovery. This performance lead to him being named the Sun-Belt player of the year Additionally, he was named to the All-Sunbelt first-team.

== Professional career ==
Pre-draft measurables
Height	Weight	40-yard dash	10-yard split	20-yard split	20-yard shuttle	Three-cone drill	Vertical jump	Broad jump	Bench press
6 ft 2 in (1.88 m)	230 lb (104 kg)	4.71 s	1.66 s	2.73 s	4.40 s	7.04 s	31 in (0.79 m)	09 ft 02 in (2.79 m)	20 reps
All results from Middle Tennessee State Pro-day as Lattimore was not invited to the NFL Combine

=== Green Bay Packers ===
Lattimore went undrafted and signed with the Green Bay Packers. He was converted from defensive end back into a linebacker and mainly served on special teams for his first two years. He made his first NFL start against the Cleveland Browns on October 20 and recorded a sack filling in because of the injuries at linebacker. At the end of the 2013 season, Lattimore was a Restricted Free Agent (RFA). The Packers offered the Lattimore the required $1.4 million tender and Lattimore signed on April 30, 2014, keeping him with the Packers through the 2014 season.

=== New York Jets ===
Lattimore was signed by the New York Jets on April 1, 2015. He played in 15 games as a backup and special teams player.

=== Buffalo Bills ===
Lattimore was signed by the Buffalo Bills on May 31, 2016. Lattimore suffered a broken nose during a freak accident while the team was in a non-contact walk-through practice. Despite making the initial 53 player roster, on September 4, 2016, he was released when the Bills claimed Dan Vitale off waivers.

=== Statistics ===
Season	Team	Games		Tackles				
Season	Team	GP	GS	Total	Solo	Ast	Sck	Int
2011	Green Bay Packers	9	0	4	4	0	0.0	0
2012	Green Bay Packers	14	0	7	6	1	0.0	0
2013	Green Bay Packers	15	4	35	24	11	2.0	0
2014	Green Bay Packers	11	5	38	23	16	0.0	1
2015	New York Jets	15	0	13	9	4	0.0	0
	Total	64	9	98	66	32	2.0	1
