= Brandon Bostick =

American football player (born 1989)

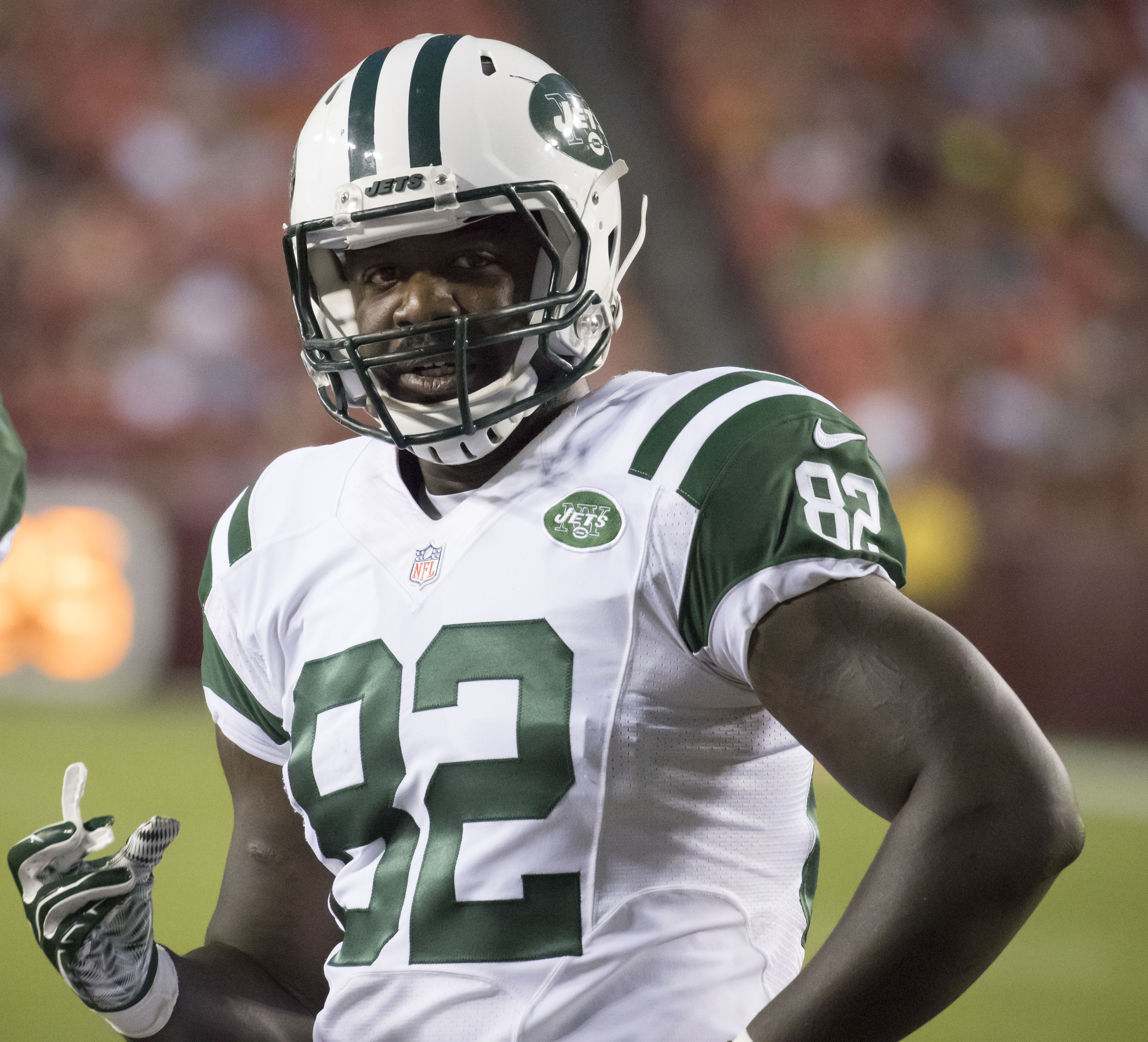
- Bostick with the New York Jets in 2016

Minnesota Golden Gophers
- Title: Offensive analyst

Personal information
- Born: May 3, 1989 (age 37); Florence, South Carolina, U.S.
- Listed height: 6 ft 3 in (1.91 m)
- Listed weight: 250 lb (113 kg)

Career information
- High school: West Florence
- College: Newberry
- NFL draft: 2012: undrafted

Career history

Playing
- Green Bay Packers (2012–2014); Minnesota Vikings (2015)*; Arizona Cardinals (2015)*; New York Jets (2015–2016)
- * Offseason or practice squad member only

Coaching
- North Dakota (2025) Assistant tight ends coach; Minnesota (2026–present) Offensive analyst

Career NFL statistics
- Receptions: 17
- Receiving yards: 186
- Receiving touchdowns: 2
- Stats at Pro Football Reference

Brandon Jamal Bostick (born May 3, 1989) is an American former professional football player who was a tight end in the National Football League (NFL). He played college football for the Newberry Wolves. Bostick was signed by the Green Bay Packers as an undrafted free agent in 2012. He was also a member of the Minnesota Vikings, Arizona Cardinals and New York Jets. He is known for his muff of an onside kick in the 2014 NFC Championship game that allowed the Seattle Seahawks to make a late fourth-quarter comeback, defeat the Packers and advance to Super Bowl XLIX.

== Early life and college ==
Bostick was born in Florence, South Carolina and graduated from West Florence High School in 2007. He then attended Newberry College, a Division II school. After redshirting his freshman year, Bostick played at Newberry as wide receiver from the 2008 to 2011 seasons. In 39 games, he started 24 and made 136 receptions for 1,935 yards and 19 touchdowns. Bostick also played basketball at Newberry for the second half of his junior season. He was a sports management major at Newberry.

== Professional career ==
Pre-draft measurables
| Height | Weight | 40-yard dash | 10-yard split | 20-yard split | 20-yard shuttle | Three-cone drill | Vertical jump | Broad jump | Bench press |
|---|---|---|---|---|---|---|---|---|---|
| 6 ft 3 in (1.91 m) | 243 lb (110 kg) | 4.59 s | 1.67 s | 2.73 s | 4.25 s | 7.41 s | 36 in (0.91 m) | 10 ft 1 in (3.07 m) | 19 reps |
All values are from Pro Day

=== Green Bay Packers ===
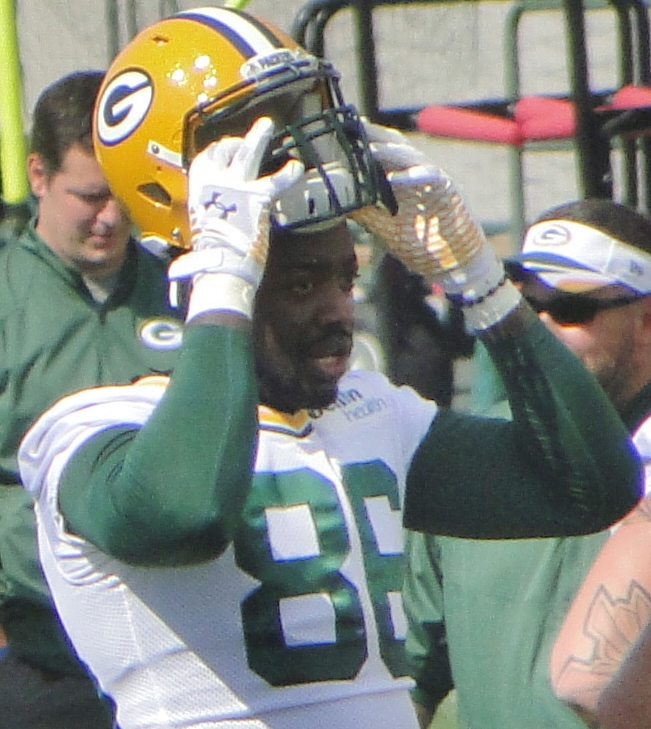
Bostick at Packers training camp in 2014

He was signed by the Packers as an undrafted free agent on May 30, 2012. Bostick spent his entire rookie season in 2012 on the practice squad.

Playing primarily on special teams, Bostick made his NFL debut on September 15, 2013, against Washington. He recorded his first NFL touchdown catch on November 10, 2013, against the Philadelphia Eagles, on a 22-yard pass from Scott Tolzien, in a play that was also Tolzien's first career touchdown pass. Bostick finished the 2013 season with seven receptions for 120 yards and a touchdown in 11 games. He missed the Thanksgiving Classic due to a concussion suffered during the November 24 game. On December 15 against Dallas, Bostick suffered a foot injury late in the second half; he was placed on season-ending injured reserve six days later.

Bostick played 13 games in the 2014 season and made two receptions for three yards and a touchdown. On November 9, in a Sunday night 55–14 win over the Chicago Bears, Bostick made the Packers' first touchdown score, on a pass from Aaron Rodgers on fourth down from the Bears' 1-yard line.

In the NFC Championship Game against the Seattle Seahawks on January 18, 2015, with slightly over two minutes remaining and the Packers leading 19–14, Bostick, the Packers' third-string tight end, misplayed a Seahawks onside kick by ignoring his blocking assignment and stepping in front of All-Pro receiver Jordy Nelson who was assigned to catch and was waiting for the ball. The ball bounced off Bostick's helmet and was recovered by Seahawks wide receiver Chris Matthews. In the ensuing drive, the Seahawks scored a touchdown and a two-point conversion to go ahead 22–19. Mason Crosby made a game-tying field goal with 14 seconds left, but Seattle won 28–22 in overtime. Bostick was widely credited in both Wisconsin and National sports media as having made a Bill Buckner-type mistake costing his team a chance for a championship. In his postgame interview, Bostick acknowledged that he was supposed to block so that Jordy Nelson could recover the onside kick. Bostick was released on February 16, 2015.

=== Minnesota Vikings ===
Bostick was claimed off waivers by the Minnesota Vikings on February 18, 2015. He was released as part of the first wave of roster cuts on August 30, 2015.

=== Arizona Cardinals ===
On September 7, 2015, the Arizona Cardinals signed Bostick to their practice squad. On September 22, 2015, he was released by the Cardinals. On October 2, 2015, Bostick was re-signed to the Cardinals' practice squad. On December 1, 2015, he was released from practice squad.

=== New York Jets ===
On December 8, 2015, the New York Jets signed Bostick to their practice squad. In 2016 he played in 16 games, starting in seven of them, finishing the season with eight catches for 63 yards.

=== Statistics ===
Source: NFL.com

| Year | Team | G | GS | Receiving | | | | | Fumbles | |
| Year | Team | G | GS | Rec | Yds | Avg | Lng | TD | Fum | Lost |
Regular season
| 2013 | GB | 11 | 0 | 7 | 120 | 17.1 | 26 | 1 | 0 | 0 |
| 2014 | GB | 13 | 0 | 2 | 3 | 1.5 | 2 | 1 | 0 | 0 |
| 2016 | NYJ | 16 | 7 | 8 | 63 | 7.9 | 14 | 0 | 0 | 0 |
| Total | | 40 | 7 | 17 | 186 | 10.9 | 26 | 2 | 0 | 0 |
Postseason
| 2014 | GB | 2 | 0 | 0 | 0 | 0.0 | 0 | 0 | 0 | 0 |
| Total | | 2 | 0 | 0 | 0 | 0.0 | 0 | 0 | 0 | 0 |

== Coaching career ==
On February 20, 2026, Bostick was hired as an offensive analyst for the Minnesota Golden Gophers.

== Personal life ==
His cousin, Akeem Bostick, is a Major League Baseball player.
