= List of UAB Blazers in the NFL draft =

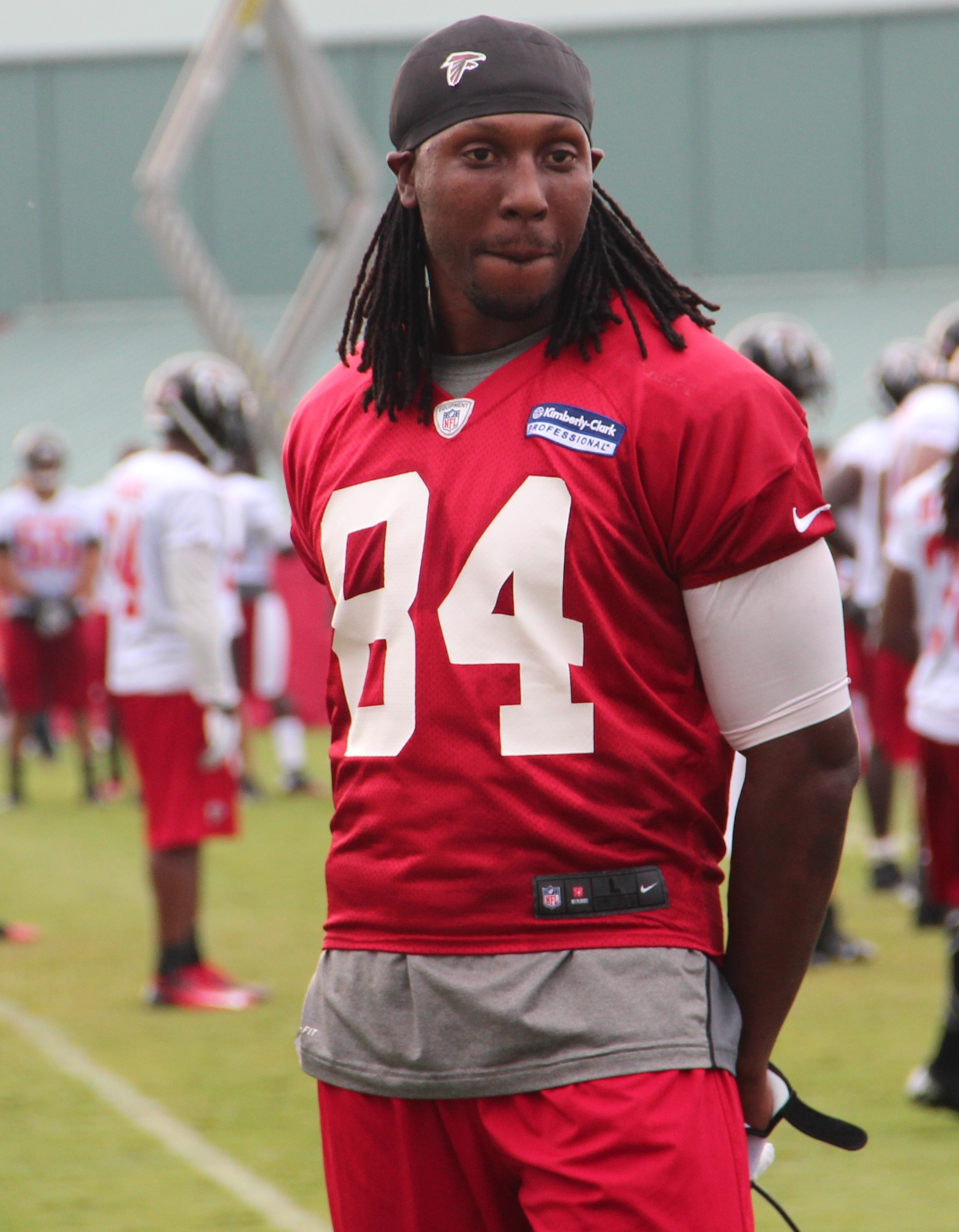
Roddy White was selected by the Atlanta Falcons in the first round of the 2005 NFL Draft.

The UAB Blazers football team, representing the University of Alabama at Birmingham, has had 14 American football players drafted into the National Football League (NFL) since the university began its football program in 1991. This includes two players taken in the first round, of which the highest pick was Bryan Thomas at 22nd overall in 2002. No team has drafted more than one player from UAB. Only one former Blazer, Roddy White, has been selected for a Pro Bowl; White participated in four consecutive games. Following the end of the 2014 season, UAB's football program was officially cancelled due to low attendance and funding problems. After much debate, UAB president Ray L. Watts announced the program would return after a two-year hiatus, in 2017.

Each NFL franchise seeks to add new players through the annual NFL Draft. The draft rules were last updated in 2009. The team with the worst record the previous year picks first, the next-worst team second, and so on. Teams that did not make the playoffs are ordered by their regular-season record with any remaining ties broken by strength of schedule. Playoff participants are sequenced after non-playoff teams, based on their round of elimination (wild card, division, conference, and Super Bowl).

Seven of UAB's twelve draft picks were taken in the sixth round, and only four were selected in the first three. The highest number of UAB players taken in a single round is two. This occurred on three different years: 1998, with Dainon Sidney and Izell Reese, 2002, with Bryan Thomas and Eddie Freeman, and 2015, with J. J. Nelson and Kennard Backman. In addition, UAB has had two players selected in compensatory picks, which are additional selections awarded to teams who have lost key players. Izell Reese and Kennard Backman are the two players.

== Key ==
| B | Back (Note: In American and Canadian football, a back is a player who is lined up behind the linemen, the players who line up closest to the line of scrimmage.) | K | Kicker | NT | Nose tackle |
| C | Center | LB | Linebacker | FB | Fullback |
| DB | Defensive back | P | Punter | HB | Halfback |
| DE | Defensive end | QB | Quarterback | WR | Wide receiver |
| DT | Defensive tackle | RB | Running back | G | Guard |
| E | End | T | Offensive tackle | TE | Tight end |

| * | Selected to a Pro Bowl |
| † | Won a Super Bowl championship |
| ‡ | Selected to a Pro Bowl and won a Super Bowl |

== Selections ==
UAB Blazers selected in the NFL Drafts
| Year | Round | Pick | Overall | Name | Position | Team | Notes |
|---|---|---|---|---|---|---|---|
| 1998 | 3 | 16 | 77 | Dainon Sidney | DB | Tennessee Oilers | — |
| 1998 | 6 | 35 | 188 | Izell Reese | DB | Dallas Cowboys | — |
| 1999 | 7 | 45 | 251 | Pernell Davis | DT | Philadelphia Eagles | — |
| 2000 | 7 | 32 | 238 | Rodregis Brooks | DB | Indianapolis Colts | — |
| 2001 | 6 | 24 | 187 | Otis Leverette | DE | Miami Dolphins | — |
| 2002 | 1 | 22 | 22 | Bryan Thomas | DE | New York Jets | — |
| 2002 | 2 | 11 | 43 | Eddie Freeman | DT | Kansas City Chiefs | — |
| 2005 | 1 | 27 | 27 | Roddy White* | WR | Atlanta Falcons | Pro Bowl (2008, 2009, 2010, 2011) |
| 2010 | 6 | 30 | 199 | Joe Webb | QB | Minnesota Vikings | — |
| 2012 | 6 | 32 | 201 | Matt McCants | T | New York Giants | — |
| 2015 | 5 | 23 | 159 | J. J. Nelson | WR | Arizona Cardinals | — |
| 2015 | 6 | 37 | 213 | Kennard Backman | TE | Green Bay Packers | — |
| 2021 | 4 | 16 | 121 | Jordan Smith | LB | Jacksonville Jaguars | — |
| 2022 | 3 | 14 | 78 | Alex Wright | DE | Cleveland Browns | — |
| 2023 | 7 | 5 | 222 | DeWayne McBride | RB | Minnesota Vikings | — |
| 2024 | 6 | 15 | 191 | Tejhaun Palmer | WR | Arizona Cardinals | — |
