= 2015 Green Bay Packers season =

NFL team season

- Owner: Green Bay Packers, Inc. (360,760 stockholders)
- General manager: Ted Thompson
- Head coach: Mike McCarthy
- Offensive coordinator: Edgar Bennett
- Defensive coordinator: Dom Capers
- Home stadium: Lambeau Field

Results
- Record: 10–6
- Division place: 2nd NFC North
- Playoffs: Won Wild Card Playoffs (at Redskins) 35–18; Lost Divisional Playoffs (at Cardinals) 20–26 (OT)
- All-Pros: 1: G Josh Sitton (2nd team)
- Pro Bowlers: 5: QB Aaron Rodgers; FB John Kuhn; G Josh Sitton; OLB Julius Peppers; ILB Clay Matthews

Uniform
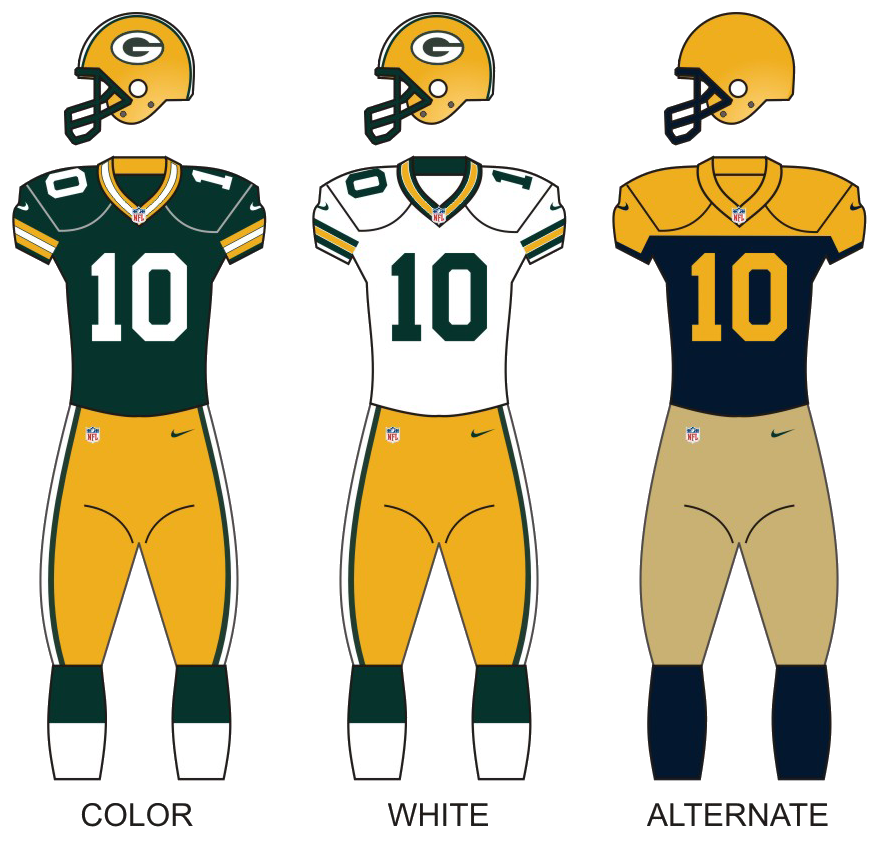

The 2015 season was the Green Bay Packers' 95th in the National Football League (NFL), their 97th overall and their 10th under head coach Mike McCarthy. With a Week 15 win over the Oakland Raiders, the Packers clinched a playoff spot for the seventh consecutive season, but failed to win their fifth consecutive NFC North title after a Week 17 loss to the Minnesota Vikings. As a result, the 5th seed Packers traveled to Washington to face the 4th seed Redskins in the wild card round. They beat the Redskins 35–18, and then traveled to Arizona for a rematch against the second-seeded Arizona Cardinals, where the Packers' season ended as they lost to the Cardinals in overtime, 26–20. One highlight of the Packers' season was a stunning come-from-behind victory over their division rivals Detroit Lions, which resulted in a 61-yard game-winning Hail Mary pass from quarterback Aaron Rodgers to tight end Richard Rodgers as time expired.

Although the Packers finished the season with a 10–6 record and made the playoffs, their offense struggled throughout the entire season after Jordy Nelson suffered a torn ACL in the preseason. The team started the season 6–0, but went 4–6 in their next 10 games. Second year wide receiver Davante Adams struggled throughout the season, leading for calls to give snaps to Jeff Janis. The offense finished the season 23rd in yards, their worst since Lindy Infante’s final season.

== Offseason ==
=== Free agents ===
| Position | Player | Free agency tag | Date signed | 2015 team |
|---|---|---|---|---|
| QB | Matt Flynn* | UFA | June 11, 2015 | New England Patriots |
| QB | Scott Tolzien | UFA | March 8, 2015 | Green Bay Packers |
| RB | DuJuan Harris | ERFA | March 19, 2015 | Minnesota Vikings |
| FB | John Kuhn | UFA | April 13, 2015 | Green Bay Packers |
| WR | Jarrett Boykin | RFA | March 27, 2015 | Carolina Panthers |
| WR | Randall Cobb | UFA | March 7, 2015 | Green Bay Packers |
| OT | Don Barclay | RFA | April 9, 2015 | Green Bay Packers |
| OT | Bryan Bulaga | UFA | March 10, 2015 | Green Bay Packers |
| NT | Letroy Guion | UFA | March 30, 2015 | Green Bay Packers |
| NT | B. J. Raji | UFA | March 30, 2015 | Green Bay Packers |
| ILB | Jamari Lattimore | UFA | April 1, 2015 | New York Jets |
| CB | Jarrett Bush | UFA | | |
| CB | Davon House | UFA | March 10, 2015 | Jacksonville Jaguars |
| CB | Tramon Williams | UFA | March 16, 2015 | Cleveland Browns |
| SS | Sean Richardson | RFA | April 13, 2015 | Green Bay Packers |
| FS | Chris Banjo | ERFA | April 17, 2015 | Green Bay Packers |

Re-signed Signed Away Suspended, Released
RFA: Restricted free agent, UFA: Unrestricted free agent, ERFA: Exclusive rights free agent, FT: Franchise Tag
*Player was signed after the June 1st deadline and will not count towards compensatory selections.

=== Draft ===
2015 Green Bay Packers draft
| Round | Pick | Player | Position | College | Notes |
| 1 | 30 | Damarious Randall | Cornerback | Arizona State | |
| 2 | 62 | Quinten Rollins | Cornerback | Miami (OH) | |
| 3 | 94 | Ty Montgomery | Wide receiver | Stanford | |
| 4 | 129 | Jake Ryan | Linebacker | Michigan | |
| 5 | 147 | Brett Hundley | Quarterback | UCLA | from Cleveland via New England |
| 6 | 206 | Aaron Ripkowski | Fullback | Oklahoma | |
| 6 | 210 | Christian Ringo | Defensive end | Louisiana-Lafayette | compensatory selection |
| 6 | 213 | Kennard Backman | Tight end | Alabama-Birmingham | compensatory selection |
Made roster

Notes

- The Packers received two compensatory selections in the sixth round of the 2015 draft.
- The Packers traded picks No. 166 and No. 247 to receive No. 147 from the New England Patriots.

=== Undrafted free agents ===
| Name | Position | College |
|---|---|---|
| Bernard Blake | Cornerback | Colorado State |
| Javess Blue | Wide receiver | Kentucky |
| Ricky Collins | Wide receiver | Texas A&M-Commerce |
| Adrian Coxson | Wide receiver | Stony Brook |
| John Crockett | Running back | North Dakota State |
| Tavarus Dantzler | Linebacker | Bethune–Cookman |
| Fabbians Ebbele | Tackle | Arizona |
| LaDarius Gunter | Cornerback | Miami (FL) |
| Alonzo Harris | Running back | Louisiana-Lafayette |
| Mitchell Henry | Tight end | Western Kentucky |
| Lavon Hooks | Defensive end | Ole Miss |
| Jimmie Hunt | Wide receiver | Missouri |
| Larry Pinkard | Wide receiver | Old Dominion |
| Jermauria Rasco | Linebacker | LSU |
| Marcus Reed | Guard | Fayetteville State |
| Matt Rotheram | Guard | Pittsburgh |
| James Vaughters | Linebacker | Stanford |

== Staff ==
2015 Green Bay Packers staff
| Front office: Executive committee – Board of Directors; President/CEO – Mark Murphy; Executive vice president/general manager/director of football operations – Ted Thompson; Vice president of football administration/player finance – Russ Ball; Director of college scouting – Brian Gutekunst; Director of player personnel – Eliot Wolf; Assistant director of pro personnel – Tim Terry; Senior personnel executive – Alonzo Highsmith; Head coaches: Head coach – Mike McCarthy; Associate head coach/offense – Tom Clements; Assistant head coach/linebackers – Winston Moss; Offensive coaches: Offensive coordinator – Edgar Bennett; Quarterbacks/wide receivers – Alex Van Pelt; Running backs – Sam Gash; Tight ends – Jerry Fontenot; Offensive line – James Campen; Assistant offensive line – Mike Solari; Offensive quality control – Luke Getsy | Defensive coaches: Defensive coordinator – Dom Capers; Defensive line – Mike Trgovac; Assistant linebackers – Scott McCurley; Secondary (Cornerbacks) – Joe Whitt Jr.; Secondary (Safeties) – Darren Perry; Defensive front assistant – Jerry Montgomery; Defensive quality control – John Rushing; Special teams coaches: Special teams coordinator – Ron Zook; Assistant special teams – Jason Simmons; Strength and conditioning: Strength and conditioning coordinator – Mark Lovat; Strength and conditioning assistant – Chris Gizzi; Strength and conditioning assistant – Thadeus Jackson |

== Final roster ==
2015 Green Bay Packers roster
| Quarterbacks (QB): 7 Brett Hundley; 12 Aaron Rodgers; 16 Scott Tolzien; Running backs (RB): 38 John Crockett; 46 Alonzo Harris; 30 John Kuhn FB; 27 Eddie Lacy; 22 Aaron Ripkowski FB; 44 James Starks; Wide receivers (WR): 17 Davante Adams; 84 Jared Abbrederis; 18 Randall Cobb; 83 Jeff Janis; 89 James Jones; Tight ends (TE): 86 Kennard Backman; 80 Justin Perillo; 81 Andrew Quarless; 82 Richard Rodgers | Offensive linemen (OL): 69 David Bakhtiari LT; 67 Don Barclay RT; 75 Bryan Bulaga RT; 70 T. J. Lang RG; 63 Corey Linsley C; 71 Josh Sitton LG; 65 Lane Taylor LG; 73 JC Tretter C; 79 Josh Walker RG; Defensive linemen (DL): 76 Mike Daniels DE; 98 Letroy Guion DE; 95 Datone Jones DE; 64 Mike Pennel DE; 90 B. J. Raji NT | Linebackers (LB): 91 Jayrone Elliott OLB; 52 Clay Matthews ILB; 55 Andy Mulumba OLB; 96 Mike Neal OLB; 51 Nate Palmer ILB; 56 Julius Peppers OLB; 53 Nick Perry OLB; 47 Jake Ryan ILB; 48 Joe Thomas ILB; Defensive backs (DB): 32 Chris Banjo SS; 42 Morgan Burnett SS; 21 Ha Ha Clinton-Dix FS; 39 Demetri Goodson CB; 36 LaDarius Gunter CB; 29 Casey Hayward CB; 33 Micah Hyde S; 23 Damarious Randall CB; 24 Quinten Rollins CB; 37 Sam Shields CB; Special teams (ST): 2 Mason Crosby K; 59 Rick Lovato LS; 8 Tim Masthay P | Practice squad: 54 Carl Bradford OLB; 31 Robertson Daniel CB; 99 Bruce Gaston NT; 85 Mitchell Henry TE; 10 Jamel Johnson WR; 77 B. J. McBryde DE; 97 Christian Ringo NT; 74 Matt Rotheram G; 26 Ross Scheuerman RB; 60 Jeremy Vujnovich LT; 19 Ed Williams WR; Reserve: 58 Sam Barrington ILB (IR); 93 Josh Boyd DE (IR); 61 Brett Goode LS (IR); 88 Ty Montgomery WR (IR); 87 Jordy Nelson WR (IR); 28 Sean Richardson SS (IR); Rookies in italics 53 active, 6 reserve, 11 practice squad |

== Starters ==
=== Regular season ===
==== Offense ====
| POS | Name | GS | Name | GS |
|---|---|---|---|---|
| QB | Aaron Rodgers | 16 | | |
| RB | Eddie Lacy | 12 | James Starks | 3 |
| FB | John Kuhn | 6 | James Starks | 1 |
| WR | Randall Cobb | 15 | | |
| WR | James Jones | 15 | | |
| WR | Davante Adams | 12 | Ty Montgomery | 3 |
| TE | Richard Rodgers | 12 | Andrew Quarless | 1 |
| LT | David Bakhtiari | 14 | | |
| LG | Josh Sitton | 16 | | |
| C | Corey Linsley | 13 | J. C. Tretter | 3 |
| RG | T. J. Lang | 15 | Lane Taylor | 2 |
| RT | Bryan Bulaga | 12 | Don Barclay | 5 |

==== Defense ====
| POS | Name | GS | Name | GS | Name | GS |
|---|---|---|---|---|---|---|
| DE | Mike Pennel | 5 | Letroy Guion | 1 | | |
| DE | Mike Daniels | 16 | Mike Neal | 2 | | |
| NT | B. J. Raji | 15 | Letroy Guion | 3 | | |
| OLB | Mike Neal | 12 | Nick Perry | 1 | | |
| OLB | Julius Peppers | 16 | | | | |
| ILB | Clay Matthews III | 16 | Jake Ryan | 5 | | |
| ILB | Nate Palmer | 11 | Sam Barrington | 1 | | |
| CB | Sam Shields | 12 | Damarious Randall | 9 | | |
| CB | Casey Hayward | 11 | Quinten Rollins | 4 | Micah Hyde | 2 |
| SS | Morgan Burnett | 11 | Micah Hyde | 5 | | |
| FS | Ha Ha Clinton-Dix | 16 | | | | |
| S | Sean Richardson | 1 | Chris Banjo | 1 | | |

=== Playoffs ===
==== Offense ====
| POS | Name | GS | Name | GS |
|---|---|---|---|---|
| QB | Aaron Rodgers | 2 | | |
| RB | Eddie Lacy | 2 | | |
| FB | John Kuhn | 1 | | |
| WR | Randall Cobb | 2 | Jared Abbrederis | 1 |
| WR | James Jones | 2 | | |
| TE | Richard Rodgers | 2 | | |
| LT | J. C. Tretter | 1 | David Bakhtiari | 1 |
| LG | Josh Sitton | 2 | | |
| C | Corey Linsley | 2 | | |
| RG | T. J. Lang | 2 | | |
| RT | Bryan Bulaga | 2 | | |

==== Defense ====
| POS | Name | GS | Name | GS |
|---|---|---|---|---|
| DT | Mike Daniels | 2 | | |
| NT | B. J. Raji | 2 | | |
| OLB | Mike Neal | 2 | | |
| OLB | Julius Peppers | 2 | | |
| ILB | Clay Matthews III | 2 | | |
| ILB | Jake Ryan | 2 | | |
| CB | Quinten Rollins | 1 | Sam Shields | 1 |
| CB | Casey Hayward | 2 | | |
| CB | Damarious Randall | 2 | | |
| SS | Morgan Burnett | 2 | | |
| FS | Ha Ha Clinton-Dix | 2 | | |

== Standings ==
=== Division ===
NFC North
| | W | L | T | PCT | DIV | CONF | PF | PA | STK |
|---|---|---|---|---|---|---|---|---|---|
| ^{(3)} Minnesota Vikings | 11 | 5 | 0 | .688 | 5–1 | 8–4 | 365 | 302 | W3 |
| ^{(5)} Green Bay Packers | 10 | 6 | 0 | .625 | 3–3 | 7–5 | 368 | 323 | L2 |
| Detroit Lions | 7 | 9 | 0 | .438 | 3–3 | 6–6 | 358 | 400 | W3 |
| Chicago Bears | 6 | 10 | 0 | .375 | 1–5 | 3–9 | 335 | 397 | L1 |

=== Conference ===
NFC
| # | Team | Division | W | L | T | PCT | DIV | CONF | SOS | SOV | STK |
|---|---|---|---|---|---|---|---|---|---|---|---|
Division Leaders
| 1 | Carolina Panthers | South | 15 | 1 | 0 | .938 | 5–1 | 11–1 | .441 | .438 | W1 |
| 2 | Arizona Cardinals | West | 13 | 3 | 0 | .813 | 4–2 | 10–2 | .477 | .457 | L1 |
| 3 | Minnesota Vikings | North | 11 | 5 | 0 | .688 | 5–1 | 8–4 | .504 | .449 | W3 |
| 4 | Washington Redskins | East | 9 | 7 | 0 | .563 | 4–2 | 8–4 | .465 | .403 | W4 |
Wild Cards
| 5 (Note: Green Bay finished ahead of Seattle based on head-to-head victory.) | Green Bay Packers | North | 10 | 6 | 0 | .625 | 3–3 | 7–5 | .531 | .450 | L2 |
| 6 | Seattle Seahawks | West | 10 | 6 | 0 | .625 | 3–3 | 7–5 | .520 | .431 | W1 |
Did not qualify for the postseason
| 7 | Atlanta Falcons | South | 8 | 8 | 0 | .500 | 1–5 | 5–7 | .480 | .453 | L1 |
| 8 (Note: St. Louis and Detroit finished ahead of Philadelphia and New Orleans based on conference record. St. Louis finished ahead of Detroit based on head-to-head victory. Detroit finished ahead of Philadelphia and New Orleans based on head-to-head sweep, while Philadelphia finished ahead of New Orleans based on head-to-head victory.) | St. Louis Rams | West | 7 | 9 | 0 | .438 | 4–2 | 6–6 | .527 | .482 | L1 |
| 9 | Detroit Lions | North | 7 | 9 | 0 | .438 | 3–3 | 6–6 | .535 | .429 | W3 |
| 10 | Philadelphia Eagles | East | 7 | 9 | 0 | .438 | 3–3 | 4–8 | .508 | .473 | W1 |
| 11 | New Orleans Saints | South | 7 | 9 | 0 | .438 | 3–3 | 5–7 | .504 | .402 | W2 |
| 12 (Note: The New York Giants and Chicago each finished ahead of Tampa Bay based on head-to-head victory, while the Giants finished ahead of Chicago based on conference record.) | New York Giants | East | 6 | 10 | 0 | .375 | 2–4 | 4–8 | .500 | .396 | L3 |
| 13 | Chicago Bears | North | 6 | 10 | 0 | .375 | 1–5 | 3–9 | .547 | .469 | L1 |
| 14 | Tampa Bay Buccaneers | South | 6 | 10 | 0 | .375 | 3–3 | 5–7 | .484 | .406 | L4 |
| 15 | San Francisco 49ers | West | 5 | 11 | 0 | .313 | 1–5 | 4–8 | .539 | .463 | W1 |
| 16 | Dallas Cowboys | East | 4 | 12 | 0 | .250 | 3–3 | 3–9 | .531 | .438 | L4 |
Tiebreakers (Note: When breaking ties for three or more teams under the NFL's rules, they are first broken within divisions, then comparing only the highest-ranked remaining team from each division.)

== Schedule ==
=== Preseason ===
| Week | Date | Opponent | Result | Record | Game site | NFL.com recap |
|---|---|---|---|---|---|---|
| 1 | August 13 | at New England Patriots | **W** 22–11 | 1–0 | Gillette Stadium | Recap |
| 2 | August 23 | at Pittsburgh Steelers | **L** 19–24 | 1–1 | Heinz Field | Recap |
| 3 | August 29 | Philadelphia Eagles | **L** 26–39 | 1–2 | Lambeau Field | Recap |
| 4 | September 3 | New Orleans Saints | **W** 38–10 | 2–2 | Lambeau Field | Recap |

=== Regular season ===
| Week | Date | Opponent | Result | Record | Game site | NFL.com recap |
|---|---|---|---|---|---|---|
| 1 | September 13 | at **Chicago Bears** | **W** 31–23 | 1–0 | Soldier Field | Recap |
| 2 | September 20 | Seattle Seahawks | **W** 27–17 | 2–0 | Lambeau Field | Recap |
| 3 | September 28 | Kansas City Chiefs | **W** 38–28 | 3–0 | Lambeau Field | Recap |
| 4 | October 4 | at San Francisco 49ers | **W** 17–3 | 4–0 | Levi's Stadium | Recap |
| 5 | October 11 | St. Louis Rams | **W** 24–10 | 5–0 | Lambeau Field | Recap |
| 6 | October 18 | San Diego Chargers | **W** 27–20 | 6–0 | Lambeau Field | Recap |
| 7 | Bye | | | | | |
| 8 | November 1 | at Denver Broncos | **L** 10–29 | 6–1 | Sports Authority Field at Mile High | Recap |
| 9 | November 8 | at Carolina Panthers | **L** 29–37 | 6–2 | Bank of America Stadium | Recap |
| 10 | November 15 | **Detroit Lions** | **L** 16–18 | 6–3 | Lambeau Field | Recap |
| 11 | November 22 | at **Minnesota Vikings** | **W** 30–13 | 7–3 | TCF Bank Stadium | Recap |
| 12 | November 26 | **Chicago Bears** | **L** 13–17 | 7–4 | Lambeau Field | Recap |
| 13 | December 3 | at **Detroit Lions** | **W** 27–23 | 8–4 | Ford Field | Recap |
| 14 | December 13 | Dallas Cowboys | **W** 28–7 | 9–4 | Lambeau Field | Recap |
| 15 | December 20 | at Oakland Raiders | **W** 30–20 | 10–4 | O.co Coliseum | Recap |
| 16 | December 27 | at Arizona Cardinals | **L** 8–38 | 10–5 | University of Phoenix Stadium | Recap |
| 17 | January 3, 2016 | **Minnesota Vikings** | **L** 13–20 | 10–6 | Lambeau Field | Recap |

Note: Intra-division opponents are in bold text.

=== Postseason ===
| Playoff round | Date | Opponent (seed) | Result | Record | Game site | NFL.com recap |
|---|---|---|---|---|---|---|
| Wild Card | January 10, 2016 | at Washington Redskins (4) | **W** 35–18 | 1–0 | FedExField | Recap |
| Divisional | January 16, 2016 | at Arizona Cardinals (2) | **L** 20–26 (OT) | 1–1 | University of Phoenix Stadium | Recap |

== Game summaries ==
=== Regular season ===
==== Week 1: at Chicago Bears ====
Week One: Green Bay Packers at Chicago Bears – Game summary

| Quarter | 1 | 2 | 3 | 4 | Total |
|---|---|---|---|---|---|
| Packers | 7 | 3 | 7 | 14 | 31 |
| Bears | 3 | 10 | 3 | 7 | 23 |

at Soldier Field, Chicago, Illinois

- Date: September 13
- Game time: 12:00 p.m. CDT
- Game weather: Mostly sunny, 68 °F (20 °C)
- Game attendance: 62,442
- Referee: Craig Wrolstad
- TV announcers (Fox): Joe Buck, Troy Aikman and Erin Andrews
- Recap, Gamebook

Game information

First quarter

- CHI – Robbie Gould 28-yard field goal, 09:32. Drive: 11 plays, 70 yards, 05:32. (CHI 3–0)
- GB – James Jones 13-yard pass from Aaron Rodgers, (Mason Crosby kick), 00:43. Drive: 10 plays, 77 yards, 04:42. (GB 7–3)

Second quarter

- CHI – Matt Forte 1-yard run, (Robbie Gould kick), 07:54. Drive: 15 plays, 80 yards, 07:54. (CHI 10–7)
- GB – Mason Crosby 37-yard field goal, 02:36. Drive: 10 plays, 61 yards, 05:17. (10–10)
- CHI – Robbie Gould 50-yard field goal, 00:13. Drive: 12 plays, 47 yards, 02:24. (CHI 13–10)

Third quarter

- GB – James Jones 1-yard pass from Aaron Rodgers, (Mason Crosby kick), 11:59. Drive: 6 plays, 59 yards, 03:04. (GB 17–13)
- CHI – Robbie Gould 44-yard field goal, 05:02. Drive: 12 plays, 56 yards, 06:59. (GB 17–16)

Fourth quarter

- GB – Randall Cobb 5-yard pass from Aaron Rodgers, (Mason Crosby kick), 10:32. Drive: 16 plays, 78 yards, 09:31. (GB 24–16)
- GB – Eddie Lacy 2-yard run, (Mason Crosby kick), 01:59. Drive: 4 plays, 48 yards, 01:46. (CHI 31–16)
- CHI – Martellus Bennett 24-yard pass from Jay Cutler, (Robbie Gould kick), 00:42. Drive: 6 plays, 72 yards, 01:21. (GB 31–23)

Top passers

- GB – Aaron Rodgers – 18/23, 189 Yds, 3 TDs
- CHI – Jay Cutler – 18/36, 225 Yds, 1 TD, 1 INT

Top rushers

- GB – Eddie Lacy – 19 Car, 85 Yds, 1 TD
- CHI – Matt Forte – 24 Car, 141 Yds, 1 TD

Top receivers

- GB – Randall Cobb – 5 Rec, 38 Yds, 1 TD
- CHI – Martellus Bennett – 5 Rec, 55 Yds, 1 TD

Top tacklers

- GB – Sam Shields – 6 Tackles, 1 Assist
- CHI – Shea McClellin – 4 Tackles, 4 Assists

The Packers opened their season against their famed arch-rival, the Bears. The Bears, behind the strong running of Matt Forte, had the early lead against the Packers, but the Packers were able to gain the advantage in the second half behind Aaron Rodgers' three touchdown passes, two of which were to James Jones, who had been cut by the New York Giants just a week prior. The Packers clinched the win with a Clay Matthews interception, followed by an Eddie Lacy touchdown run, giving the Packers their tenth win over the Bears in the rivals' 12 most recent games.

==== Week 2: vs. Seattle Seahawks ====
Week Two: Seattle Seahawks at Green Bay Packers – Game summary

| Quarter | 1 | 2 | 3 | 4 | Total |
|---|---|---|---|---|---|
| Seahawks | 3 | 0 | 14 | 0 | 17 |
| Packers | 10 | 3 | 3 | 11 | 27 |

at Lambeau Field, Green Bay, Wisconsin

- Date: September 20
- Game time: 7:30 p.m. CDT
- Game weather: 62 °F (17 °C), clear
- Game attendance: 78,433
- Referee: Gene Steratore
- TV announcers (NBC): Al Michaels, Cris Collinsworth and Michele Tafoya
- Recap, Gamebook

Game information

First quarter

- GB – James Jones 29-yard pass from Aaron Rodgers, (Mason Crosby kick), 10:51. Drive: 10 plays, 90 yards, 04:15. (GB 7–0)
- GB – Mason Crosby 54-yard field goal, 06:57. Drive: 4 plays, 7 yards, 01:55. (GB 10–0)
- SEA – Steven Hauschka 54-yard field goal, 03:13. Drive: 9 plays, 51 yards, 03:39. (GB 10–3)

Second quarter

- GB – Mason Crosby 18-yard field goal, 00:02. Drive: 6 plays, 27 yards, 01:14. (GB 13–3)

Third quarter

- SEA – Fred Jackson 5-yard pass from Russell Wilson, (Steven Hauschka kick), 10:01. Drive: 10 plays, 75 yards, 05:03. (GB 13–10)
- SEA – Doug Baldwin 13-yard pass from Russell Wilson, (Steven Hauschka kick), 06:53. Drive: 5 plays, 54 yards, 01:45. (SEA 17–13)
- GB – Mason Crosby 44-yard field goal, 03:16. Drive: 8 plays, 54 yards, 03:12. (SEA 17–16)

Fourth quarter

- GB – Richard Rodgers 5-yard pass from Aaron Rodgers, (Two-point conversion, Richard Rodgers pass from Aaron Rodgers), 09:28. Drive: 10 plays, 80 yards, 06:16. (GB 24–17)
- GB – Mason Crosby 21-yard field goal, 02:00. Drive: 9 plays, 34 yards, 04:54. (GB 27–17)

Top passers

- SEA – Russell Wilson – 19/30, 206 Yds, 2 TDs, 1 INT
- GB – Aaron Rodgers – 25/33, 249 Yds, 2 TDs

Top rushers

- SEA – Russell Wilson – 10 Car, 78 Yds
- GB – James Starks – 20 Car, 95 Yds

Top receivers

- SEA – Doug Baldwin – 7 Rec, 92 Yds, 1 TD
- GB – Randall Cobb – 8 Rec, 116 Yds

Top tacklers

- SEA – Marcus Burley – 7 Tackles
- GB – Ha Ha Clinton-Dix – 7 Tackles, 2 Assists

The Packers' home opener featured a rematch of the 2014 NFC Championship Game between the Packers and the Seattle Seahawks, who had won in their previous three meetings with the Packers, all of them in Seattle. The Packers got the early 13–3 lead, helped by James Jones' 3rd touchdown reception in only two games, but the Seahawks were able to rally back on two Russell Wilson touchdown passes, giving Seattle a 17–13 lead in the third quarter. The Packers then scored 14 unanswered points, aided by two Seahawks turnovers and shut down the Seahawks offense, holding their star running back, Marshawn Lynch, to only 42 yards rushing with a 2.7 yards per carry average. The Packers won 27–17, building up a 2–0 record and adding to a ten-game winning streak at Lambeau Field.

==== Week 3: vs. Kansas City Chiefs ====
Week Three: Kansas City Chiefs at Green Bay Packers – Game summary

| Quarter | 1 | 2 | 3 | 4 | Total |
|---|---|---|---|---|---|
| Chiefs | 0 | 7 | 7 | 14 | 28 |
| Packers | 14 | 10 | 7 | 7 | 38 |

at Lambeau Field, Green Bay, Wisconsin

- Date: September 28
- Game time: 7:30 p.m. CDT
- Game weather: 67 °F (19 °C), light showers
- Game attendance: 78,214
- Referee: John Parry
- TV announcers (ESPN): Mike Tirico, Jon Gruden and Lisa Salters
- Recap, Gamebook

Game information

First quarter

- GB – Ty Montgomery 8-yard pass from Aaron Rodgers, (Mason Crosby kick), 09:50. Drive: 6 plays, 69 yards, 02:30. (GB 7–0)
- GB – Randall Cobb 3-yard pass from Aaron Rodgers, (Mason Crosby kick), 02:23. Drive: 10 plays, 74 yards, 05:46. (GB 14–0)

Second quarter

- KC – Jamaal Charles 9-yard run, (Cairo Santos kick), 12:08. Drive: 3 plays, 47 yards, 01:00. (GB 14–7)
- GB – Mason Crosby 44-yard field goal, 06:20. Drive: 9 plays, 56 yards, 05:42. (GB 17–7)
- GB – James Jones 27-yard pass from Aaron Rodgers, (Mason Crosby kick), 00:56. Drive: 9 plays, 73 yards, 03:02. (GB 24–7)

Third quarter

- GB – Randall Cobb 4-yard pass from Aaron Rodgers, (Mason Crosby kick), 07:22. Drive: 1 plays, 4 yards, 00:00. (GB 31–7)
- KC – Jeremy Maclin 5-yard pass from Alex Smith, (Cairo Santos kick), 01:00. Drive: 11 plays, 80 yards, 07:18. (GB 31–14)

Fourth quarter

- GB – Randall Cobb 4-yard pass from Aaron Rodgers, (Mason Crosby kick), 12:13. Drive: 8 plays, 80 yards, 03:43. (GB 38–14)
- KC – Jamaal Charles 4-yard run, (Two-point conversion, Travis Kelce pass from Alex Smith), 10:01. Drive: 7 plays, 79 yards, 02:09. (GB 38–22)
- KC – Jamaal Charles 7-yard run, 01:30. Drive: 17 plays, 78 yards, 04:18. (GB 38–28)

Top passers

- KC – Alex Smith – 24/40, 290 Yds, 1 TD, 1 INT
- GB – Aaron Rodgers – 24/35, 333 Yds, 5 TDs

Top rushers

- KC – Jamaal Charles – 11 Car, 49 Yds, 3 TDs
- GB – Eddie Lacy – 10 Car, 46 Yds

Top receivers

- KC – Jeremy Maclin – 8 Rec, 141 Yds, 1 TD
- GB – James Jones – 7 Rec, 139 Yds, 1 TD

Top tacklers

- KC – Derrick Johnson – 8 Tackles
- GB – Sam Shields – 6 Tackles, 1 INT

The Chiefs came in as one of only two teams in the NFL, the other being the Houston Texans, who have never lost at Lambeau Field (until Week 13 of the 2016 NFL season.) The Packers dominated the Chiefs for most of the game, with Aaron Rodgers throwing five touchdown passes, though the Chiefs managed to outscore the Packers 21–14 in the second half. The Packers' 38–28 victory ended the Chiefs' being undefeated at Lambeau and extended the Packers' own home winning streak to eleven games.

==== Week 4: at San Francisco 49ers ====
Week Four: Green Bay Packers at San Francisco 49ers – Game summary

| Quarter | 1 | 2 | 3 | 4 | Total |
|---|---|---|---|---|---|
| Packers | 7 | 0 | 10 | 0 | 17 |
| 49ers | 0 | 3 | 0 | 0 | 3 |

at Levi's Stadium, Santa Clara, California

- Date: October 4
- Game time: 3:25 p.m. CDT/1:25 p.m. PDT
- Game weather: 74 °F (23 °C), sunny
- Game attendance: 70,799
- Referee: Terry McAulay
- TV announcers (Fox): Joe Buck, Troy Aikman and Erin Andrews
- Recap, Gamebook

Game information

First quarter

- GB – Richard Rodgers 9-yard pass from Aaron Rodgers, (Mason Crosby kick), 09:12. Drive: 12 plays, 80 yards, 05:58. (GB 7–0)

Second quarter

- SF – Phil Dawson 33-yard field goal, 04:28. Drive: 12 plays, 57 yards, 06:23. (GB 7–3)

Third quarter

- GB – John Kuhn 1-yard run, (Mason Crosby kick), 07:10. Drive: 9 plays, 61 yards, 04:33. (GB 14–3)
- GB – Mason Crosby 31-yard field goal, 00:45. Drive: 8 yards, 35 yards, 04:38. (GB 17–3)

Fourth quarter

- No scoring plays

Top passers

- GB – Aaron Rodgers – 22/32, 224 Yds, 1 TD
- SF – Colin Kaepernick – 13/25, 160 Yds, 1 INT

Top rushers

- GB – Eddie Lacy – 18 Car, 90 Yds
- SF – Colin Kaepernick – 10 Car, 57 Yds

Top receivers

- GB – James Jones – 5 Rec, 98 Yds
- SF – Torrey Smith – 2 Rec, 54 Yds

Top tacklers

- GB – Ha Ha Clinton-Dix – 7 tackles
- SF – NaVorro Bowman – 7 tackles, 1 assist

This game was the Packers first trip to Levi's Stadium, which opened in 2014.

With the win, the Packers improved to 4–0. The Packers not only got their first win over the 49ers since 2010, but it was also the Packers' first victory over Colin Kaepernick.

==== Week 5: vs. St. Louis Rams ====
Week Five: St. Louis Rams at Green Bay Packers – Game summary

| Quarter | 1 | 2 | 3 | 4 | Total |
|---|---|---|---|---|---|
| Rams | 0 | 10 | 0 | 0 | 10 |
| Packers | 14 | 0 | 7 | 3 | 24 |

at Lambeau Field, Green Bay, Wisconsin

- Date: October 11
- Game time: 12:00 p.m. CDT
- Game weather: 67 °F (19 °C), clear
- Game attendance: 78,432
- Referee: Brad Allen
- TV announcers (CBS): Ian Eagle, Dan Fouts and Evan Washburn
- Recap, Gamebook

Game information

First quarter

- GB – Ty Montgomery 31-yard pass from Aaron Rodgers, (Mason Crosby kick), 12:16. Drive: 6 plays, 56 yards, 01:48. (GB 7–0)
- GB – Quinten Rollins 45-yard Interception return, (Mason Crosby kick), 01:02, 6 plays, 56 yarde, 01:48. (GB 14–0)

Second quarter

- STL – Tavon Austin 5-yard pass from Nick Foles, (Greg Zuerlein kick), 07:16. Drive: 9 plays, 48 yards, 05:06. (GB 14–7)
- STL – Greg Zuerlein 42-yard field goal, 01:44. Drive: 7 plays, 14 yards, 02:19. (GB 14–10)

Third quarter

- GB – James Jones 64-yard pass from Aaron Rodgers, (Mason Crosby kick), 12:52. Drive: 4 plays, 75 yards, 02:08. (GB 21–10)

Fourth quarter

- GB – Mason Crosby 35-yard field goal, 01:07. Drive: 7 plays, 35 yards, 02:16. (GB 24–10)

Top passers

- STL – Nick Foles – 11/30, 141 Yds, 1 TD, 4 INTs
- GB – Aaron Rodgers – 19/30, 241 Yds, 2 TDs, 2 INTs

Top rushers

- STL – Todd Gurley – 30 Car, 159 Yds
- GB – Aaron Rodgers – 8 Car, 39 Yds

Top receivers

- STL – Stedman Bailey – 3 Rec, 73 Yds
- GB – James Jones – 2 Rec, 77 Yds, 1 TD

Top tacklers

- STL – Lamarcus Joyner – 6 Tackles, 1 Assist
- GB – Mike Daniels – 7 Tackles, 1 Assist

Aaron Rodgers threw his first interception at home since 2012, which was picked off by James Laurinaitis. The Packers' defense intercepted St. Louis quarterback Nick Foles four times, one of them returned for a touchdown by Quinten Rollins for 45 yards.

The Packers went to 5–0 for the first time since 2011.

==== Week 6: vs. San Diego Chargers ====
Week Six: San Diego Chargers at Green Bay Packers – Game summary

| Quarter | 1 | 2 | 3 | 4 | Total |
|---|---|---|---|---|---|
| Chargers | 3 | 7 | 7 | 3 | 20 |
| Packers | 14 | 3 | 7 | 3 | 27 |

at Lambeau Field, Green Bay, Wisconsin

- Date: October 18
- Game time: 3:25 p.m. CDT
- Game weather: 54 °F (12 °C), clear
- Game attendance: 78,434
- Referee: Walt Anderson
- TV announcers (CBS): Jim Nantz, Phil Simms and Tracy Wolfson
- Recap, Gamebook

Game information

First quarter

- GB – James Starks 5-yard pass from Aaron Rodgers, (Mason Crosby kick), 08:44. Drive: 8 plays, 92 yards, 03:38. (GB 7–0)
- SD – Josh Lambo 36-yard field goal, 03:21. Drive: 14 plays, 62 yards, 05:17. (GB 7–3)
- GB – James Starks 65-yard run, (Mason Crosby kick), 02:03. Drive: 4 plays, 66 yards, 01:14. (GB 14–3)

Second quarter

- GB – Mason Crosby 23-yard field goal, 06:51. Drive: 10 plays, 78 yards, 03:55. (GB 17–3)
- SD – Dontrelle Inman 1-yard pass from Philip Rivers, (Josh Lambo kick), 00:02. Drive: 12 plays, 101 yards, 04:45. (GB 17–10)

Third quarter

- SD – Ladarius Green 19-yard pass from Philip Rivers, (Josh Lambo kick), 09:29. Drive: 8 plays, 93 yards, 04:06. (17–17)
- GB – James Jones 8-yard pass from Aaron Rodgers, (Mason Crosby kick), 00:49. Drive: 7 plays, 69 yards, 02:45. (GB 24–17)

Fourth quarter

- SD – Josh Lambo 32-yard field goal, 11:14. Drive: 10 plays, 63 yards, 04:32. (GB 24–20)
- GB – Mason Crosby 28-yard field goal, 02:41. Drive: 9 plays, 65 yards, 03:33. (GB 27–20)

Top passers

- SD – Philip Rivers – 43/65, 503 Yds, 2 TDs
- GB – Aaron Rodgers – 16/29, 255 Yds, 2 TDs

Top rushers

- SD – Melvin Gordon – 7 Car, 29 Yds
- GB – James Starks – 10 Car, 112 Yds, 1 TD

Top receivers

- SD – Keenan Allen – 14 Rec, 157 Yds
- GB – Jeff Janis – 2 Rec, 79 Yds

Top tacklers

- SD – Denzel Perryman – 7 Tackles, 1 Assist
- GB – Micah Hyde – 9 Tackles, 1 Assist

The Packers wore new throwback uniforms, replicas of their uniforms from the 1940s, for their game against the Chargers.

The Packers took another early lead, helped by James Starks' two touchdown runs, but the Chargers came back, with Philip Rivers hitting key passes to Keenan Allen. The two teams traded points in the second half, with the Chargers able to keep pace with the Packers. In the last play of the game, Packers rookie cornerback Damarious Randall has deflected what could have been a game-tying touchdown pass from San Diego quarterback Philip Rivers.

With the win, the Packers entered their bye week at 6–0. It is also the second time the Packers started 6–0 after the 2011 season.

==== Week 8: at Denver Broncos ====
Week Eight: Green Bay Packers at Denver Broncos – Game summary

| Quarter | 1 | 2 | 3 | 4 | Total |
|---|---|---|---|---|---|
| Packers | 0 | 7 | 3 | 0 | 10 |
| Broncos | 7 | 10 | 7 | 5 | 29 |

at Sports Authority Field at Mile High, Denver, Colorado

- Date: November 1
- Game time: 7:30 p.m. CST/6:30 p.m. MST
- Game weather: 61 °F (16 °C), partly cloudy
- Game attendance: 77,075
- Referee: John Parry
- TV announcers (NBC): Al Michaels, Cris Collinsworth and Michele Tafoya
- Recap, Gamebook

Game information

First quarter

- DEN – Ronnie Hillman 1-yard run, (Brandon McManus kick), 04:43. Drive: 9 plays, 83 yards, 04:53. (DEN 7–0)

Second quarter

- DEN – Ronnie Hillman 15-yard run, (Brandon McManus kick), 14:10. Drive: 6 plays, 95 yards, 02:35. (DEN 14–0)
- DEN – Brandon McManus 50-yard field goal, 07:51. Drive: 8 plays, 51 yards, 04:07. (DEN 17–0)
- GB – Eddie Lacy 2-yard run, (Mason Crosby kick), 03:02. Drive: 10 plays, 61 yards, 04:44. (DEN 17–7)

Third quarter

- GB – Mason Crosby 56-yard field goal, 09:13. Drive: 11 plays, 37 yards, 05:47. (DEN 17–10)
- DEN – C. J. Anderson 28-yard run, (Brandon McManus kick), 05:32. Drive: 8 plays, 80 yards, 03:35. (DEN 24–10)

Fourth quarter

- DEN – Brandon McManus 24-yard field goal, 12:28. Drive: 9 plays, 74 yards, 04:42. (DEN 27–10)
- DEN – Safety (Richard Rodgers tackled by Malik Jackson). (DEN 29–10)

Top passers

- GB – Aaron Rodgers – 14/22, 77 Yds
- DEN – Peyton Manning – 21/29, 340 Yds, 1 INT

Top rushers

- GB – Eddie Lacy – 11 Car, 38 Yds, 1 TD
- DEN – C. J. Anderson – 14 Car, 101 Yds, 1 TD

Top receivers

- GB – Randall Cobb – 6 Rec, 27 Yds
- DEN – Demaryius Thomas – 8 Rec, 168 Yds

Top tacklers

- GB – Casey Hayward – 6 Tackles, 1 Assist
- DEN – Brandon Marshall – 6 Tackles, 1 forced fumble

The Packers flew to Denver for a duel with Peyton Manning and the undefeated Denver Broncos. The Broncos wore their alternate blue uniforms with white pants as worn in Super Bowl XXXII.

Packers cornerbacks Sam Shields and rookie cornerback Quinten Rollins suffered a shoulder injury in the game and their returns were questionable.

The Broncos took the lead early in the first quarter when Ronnie Hillman scored a 1-yard touchdown.

In the second quarter, Hillman scored another touchdown and the Broncos led 14–0. The Broncos lead became 17–0 when Brandon McManus made a 50-yard field goal. Von Miller was injured during the second quarter. The Packers struck back when Eddie Lacy scored on a 2-yard touchdown run. They trailed 7–17 at halftime.

In the third quarter, the Packers cut Denver's lead to seven when Mason Crosby made a 56-yard field goal. Denver extended their lead to 24–10 when C. J. Anderson made a 28-yard run. Denver responded with McManus kicking a 24-yard field goal and DeMarcus Ware sacking Aaron Rodgers for a safety, making the score 29–10.

The Packers defense finally recorded an interception when Damarious Randall picked off Peyton Manning. In this game, the Broncos held Rodgers to 77 yards passing, the lowest of his starting career in a game where he hasn't come off with injury.

==== Week 9: at Carolina Panthers ====
Week Nine: Green Bay Packers at Carolina Panthers – Game summary

| Quarter | 1 | 2 | 3 | 4 | Total |
|---|---|---|---|---|---|
| Packers | 7 | 0 | 7 | 15 | 29 |
| Panthers | 3 | 24 | 3 | 7 | 37 |

at Bank of America Stadium, Charlotte, North Carolina

- Date: November 8
- Game time: 1:00 p.m. EST/12:00 p.m. CST
- Game weather: 57 °F (14 °C), cloudy
- Game attendance: 74,461
- Referee: Gene Steratore
- TV announcers (Fox): Joe Buck, Troy Aikman and Erin Andrews
- Recap, Gamebook

Game information

First quarter

- CAR – Graham Gano 20-yard field goal, 10:16. Drive: 9 plays, 68 yards, 04:48. (CAR 3–0)
- GB – Richard Rodgers 1-yard pass from Aaron Rodgers, (Mason Crosby kick), 01:55. Drive: 11 plays, 65 yards, 05:51. (GB 7–3)

Second quarter

- CAR – Cam Newton 1-yard run, (Graham Gano kick), 12:14. Drive: 7 plays, 80 yards, 03:46. (CAR 10–7)
- CAR – Greg Olsen 7-yard pass from Cam Newton, (Graham Gano kick), 08:59. Drive: 3 plays, 62 yards, 01:24. (CAR 17–7)
- CAR – Graham Gano 49-yard field goal, 05:05. Drive: 6 plays, 20 yards, 02:55. (CAR 20–7)
- CAR – Corey Brown 39-yard pass from Cam Newton, (Graham Gano kick), 00:49. Drive: 4 plays, 52 yards, 01:12. (CAR 27–7)

Third quarter

- GB – Randall Cobb 53-yard pass from Aaron Rodgers, (Mason Crosby kick), 14:10. Drive: 3 plays, 80 yards, 01:00. (CAR 27–14)
- CAR – Graham Gano 22-yard field goal, 04:52. Drive: 13 plays, 82 yards, 06:35. (CAR 30–14)

Fourth quarter

- CAR – Devin Funchess 14-yard pass from Cam Newton, (Graham Gano kick), 09:27. Drive: 5 plays, 74 yards, 02:21. (CAR 37–14)
- GB – James Starks 29-yard pass from Aaron Rodgers, (Two-point conversion, Davante Adams pass from Aaron Rodgers), 08:04. Drive: 6 plays, 79 yards, 01:28. (CAR 37–22)
- GB – James Starks 3-yard pass from Aaron Rodgers, (Mason Crosby kick), 03:47. Drive: 8 plays, 72 yards, 02:38. (CAR 37–29)

Top passers

- GB – Aaron Rodgers – 25/48, 369 Yds, 4 TDs, 1 INT
- CAR – Cam Newton – 15/30, 297 Yds, 3 TDs, 1 INT

Top rushers

- GB – James Starks – 10 Car, 39 Yds
- CAR – Jonathan Stewart – 20 Car, 66 Yds

Top receivers

- GB – Davante Adams – 7 Rec, 93 Yds
- CAR – Greg Olsen – 4 Rec, 66 Yds, 1 TD

Top tacklers

- GB – Jake Ryan – 6 Tackles, 4 Assists
- CAR – Luke Kuechly – 6 Tackles, 3 Assists

Green Bay would travel to Charlotte to take on the undefeated Panthers. The Panthers would lead all game. The Panthers would lead 37–14 at one point. Green Bay would try to come back, but ultimately fell short, as Carolina hung on for the win. Despite the loss, Aaron Rodgers would throw 4 touchdown passes with only 1 interception.

With the loss, the Packers fell to 6–2.

==== Week 10: vs. Detroit Lions ====
Week Ten: Detroit Lions at Green Bay Packers – Game summary

| Quarter | 1 | 2 | 3 | 4 | Total |
|---|---|---|---|---|---|
| Lions | 0 | 3 | 6 | 9 | 18 |
| Packers | 3 | 0 | 0 | 13 | 16 |

at Lambeau Field, Green Bay, Wisconsin

- Date: November 15
- Game time: 12:00 p.m. CST
- Game weather: 55 °F (13 °C), sunny
- Game attendance: 78,526
- Referee: John Hussey
- TV announcers (Fox): Joe Buck, Troy Aikman and Erin Andrews
- Recap, Gamebook

Game information

First quarter

- GB – Mason Crosby 44-yard field goal, 10:11. Drive: 12 plays, 57 yards, 04:54. (GB 3–0)

Second quarter

- DET – Matt Prater 49-yard field goal, 00:17. Drive: 5 plays, 22 yards, 00:33. (3–3)

Third quarter

- DET – Brandon Pettigrew 2-yard pass from Matthew Stafford, 13:37. Drive: 3 plays, 1 yards, 01:27. (DET 9–3)

Fourth quarter

- DET – Matt Prater 51-yard field goal, 13:15. Drive: 5 plays, 22 yards, 01:39. (DET 12–3)
- GB – Richard Rodgers 4-yard pass from Aaron Rodgers, (Mason Crosby kick), 05:59. Drive: 11 plays, 78 yards, 04:05. (DET 12–10)
- DET – Lance Moore 4-yard pass from Matthew Stafford, 02:00. Drive: 9 plays, 80 yards, 03:58. (DET 18–10)
- GB – Justin Perillo 11-yard pass from Aaron Rodgers, 00:36. Drive: 8 plays, 73 yards, 01:25. (DET 18–16)

Top passers

- DET – Matthew Stafford – 24/38, 242 Yds, 2 TDs, 1 INT
- GB – Aaron Rodgers – 35/61, 333 Yds, 2 TDs

Top rushers

- DET – Joique Bell – 14 Car, 17 Yds
- GB – James Starks – 15 Car, 42 Yds

Top receivers

- DET – Calvin Johnson – 6 Rec, 81 Yds
- GB – Davante Adams – 10 Rec, 79 Yds

Top tacklers

- DET – Isa Abdul-Quddus – 8 Tackles
- GB – Ha Ha Clinton-Dix – 9 Tackles, 2 Assists, 1 INT

For the first time since 1991, the Packers lost to the Lions at home.

==== Week 11: at Minnesota Vikings ====
Week Eleven: Green Bay Packers at Minnesota Vikings – Game summary

| Quarter | 1 | 2 | 3 | 4 | Total |
|---|---|---|---|---|---|
| Packers | 6 | 10 | 3 | 11 | 30 |
| Vikings | 6 | 0 | 7 | 0 | 13 |

at TCF Bank Stadium, Minneapolis, Minnesota

- Date: November 22
- Game time: 3:25 p.m. CST
- Game weather: 30 °F (−1 °C), mostly cloudy
- Game attendance: 52,529
- Referee: Walt Coleman
- TV announcers (Fox): Joe Buck, Troy Aikman and Erin Andrews
- Recap, Gamebook

Game information

First quarter

- GB – Mason Crosby 42-yard field goal, 04:54. Drive: 13 plays, 51 yards, 05:30. (GB 3–0)
- MIN – Kyle Rudolph 47-yard pass from Teddy Bridgewater, 03:11. Drive: 4 plays, 64 yards, 01:38. (MIN 6–3)
- GB – Mason Crosby 47-yard field goal, 01:42. Drive: 4 plays, 5 yards, 01:19. (6–6)

Second quarter

- GB – Mason Crosby 40-yard field goal, 10:22. Drive: 6 plays, 45 yards, 02:13. (GB 9–6)
- GB – Randall Cobb 10-yard pass from Aaron Rodgers, (Mason Crosby kick), 00:10. Drive: 25 plays, 55 yards, 02:09. (GB 16–6)

Third quarter

- GB – Mason Crosby 42-yard field goal, 10:18. Drive: 12 plays, 66 yards, 04:42. (GB 19–6)
- MIN – Adrian Peterson 6-yard run, (Blair Walsh kick), 02:42. Drive: 4 plays, 63 yards, 01:55. (GB 19–13)

Fourth quarter

- GB – James Jones 27-yard pass from Aaron Rodgers, (Two-point conversion, James Jones pass from Aaron Rodgers), 15:00. Drive: 7 plays, 85 yards, 02:37. (GB 27–13)
- GB – Mason Crosby 52-yard field goal, 04:19. Drive: 4 plays, −1 yards, 00:18. (GB 30–13)

Top passers

- GB – Aaron Rodgers – 16/34, 212 Yds, 2 TDs
- MIN – Teddy Bridgewater – 25/37, 296 Yds, 1 TD

Top rushers

- GB – Eddie Lacy – 22 Car, 100 Yds
- MIN – Adrian Peterson – 13 Car, 45 Yds, 1 TD

Top receivers

- GB – James Jones – 6 Rec, 109 Yds, 1 TD
- MIN – Kyle Rudolph – 6 Rec, 106 Yds, 1 TD

Top tacklers

- GB – Ha Ha Clinton-Dix – 8 Tackles, 1 Sack
- MIN – Linval Joseph – 9 Tackles

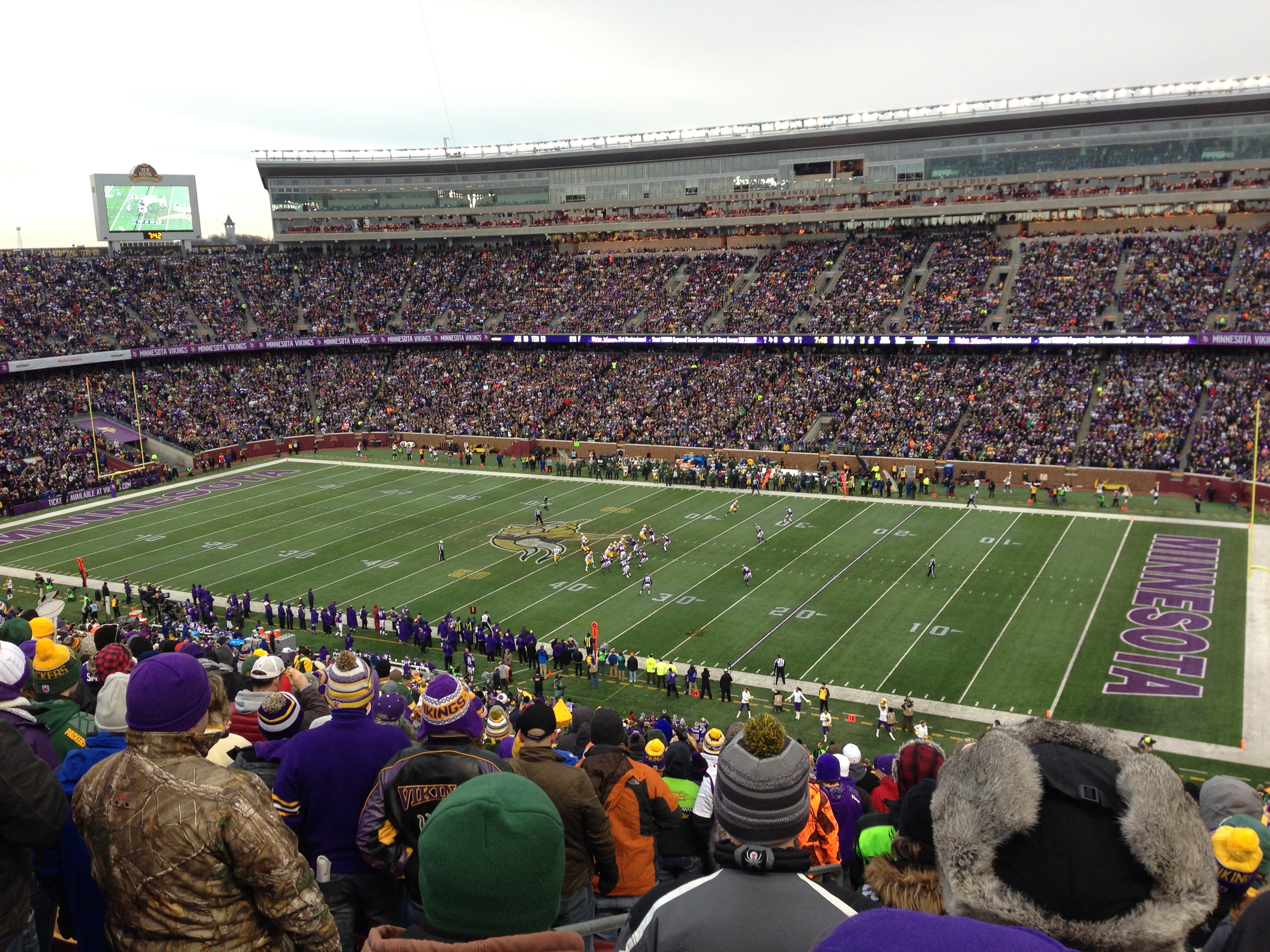
Green Bay visits Minnesota to play the Vikings at TCF Bank Stadium

The Packers broke their three-game losing streak with a victory in Minnesota. Green Bay held Minnesota to two scores, including a 47-yard pass from Teddy Bridgewater to Kyle Rudolph for the game's first touchdown. The Vikings' extra point try went wide, and after three Green Bay field goals, the Packers closed out the first half with a TD pass from Rodgers to Cobb to take a 10-point lead. Adrian Peterson scored in the third quarter to bring the Vikings within six points of the Packers, but Green Bay got it back with a long pass from Rodgers to James Jones in the corner of the end zone. Two second-half Crosby field goals brought Green Bay's total to 30, and the Vikings relinquished their brief first-place standing in the NFC North back to the Pack.

==== Week 12: vs. Chicago Bears ====
Thanksgiving Day game

Week Twelve: Chicago Bears at Green Bay Packers – Game summary

| Quarter | 1 | 2 | 3 | 4 | Total |
|---|---|---|---|---|---|
| Bears | 0 | 14 | 0 | 3 | 17 |
| Packers | 7 | 6 | 0 | 0 | 13 |

at Lambeau Field, Green Bay, Wisconsin

- Date: November 26
- Game time: 7:30 p.m. CST
- Game weather: 39 °F (4 °C), rain
- Game attendance: 78,488
- Referee: Ed Hochuli
- TV announcers (NBC): Al Michaels, Cris Collinsworth and Michele Tafoya
- Recap, Gamebook

Game information

First quarter

- GB – Eddie Lacy 25-yard pass from Aaron Rodgers, (Mason Crosby kick), 05:28. Drive: 5 plays, 44 yards, 01:36. (GB 7–0)

Second quarter

- CHI – Zach Miller 3-yard pass from Jay Cutler, (Robbie Gould kick), 06:08. Drive: 9 plays, 34 yards, 04:36. (7–7)
- GB – Mason Crosby 22-yard field goal, 02:03. Drive: 7 plays, 38 yards, 04:00. (GB 10–7)
- CHI – Jeremy Langford 1-yard run, (Robbie Gould kick), 00:34. Drive: 7 plays, 58 yards, 01:24. (CHI 14–10)
- GB – Mason Crosby 50-yard field goal, 00:04. Drive: 5 plays, 36 yards, 00:26. (CHI 14–13)

Third quarter

- No scoring plays

Fourth quarter

- CHI – Robbie Gould 21-yard field goal, 12:18. Drive: 15 plays, 65 yards, 07:26. (CHI 17–13)

Top passers

- CHI – Jay Cutler – 19/31, 200 Yds, 1 TD
- GB – Aaron Rodgers – 22/43, 202 Yds, 1 TD, 1 INT

Top rushers

- CHI – Jeremy Langford – 12 Car, 48 Yds, 1 TD
- GB – Eddie Lacy – 17 Car, 105 Yds

Top receivers

- CHI – Alshon Jeffery – 7 Rec, 90 Yds
- GB – Randall Cobb – 6 Rec, 74 Yds

Top tacklers

- CHI – Adrian Amos – 8 Tackles, 1 Assist
- GB – Morgan Burnett – 6 Tackles, 1 Assist

On a night where the Packers would retire long-time star quarterback Brett Favre's jersey, Chicago would upset Green Bay, winning 17–13. The Packers had a chance near the end to steal the win from Chicago, but the Bears defense would force a turnover on downs to end the game.

With the loss, the Packers fell to 7–4.

==== Week 13: at Detroit Lions ====
Week Thirteen: Green Bay Packers at Detroit Lions – Game summary

| Quarter | 1 | 2 | 3 | 4 | Total |
|---|---|---|---|---|---|
| Packers | 0 | 0 | 14 | 13 | 27 |
| Lions | 17 | 0 | 3 | 3 | 23 |

at Ford Field, Detroit, Michigan

- Date: December 3
- Game time: 8:25 p.m. EST/7:25 p.m. CST
- Game weather: Played indoors (dome stadium)
- Game attendance: 63,207
- Referee: Carl Cheffers
- TV announcers (CBS): Jim Nantz, Phil Simms and Tracy Wolfson
- Recap, Gamebook

Game information

First quarter

- DET – Matt Prater 51-yard field goal, 8:53. Lions 3–0. Drive: 7 plays, 35 yards, 4:04.
- DET – Eric Ebron 3-yard pass from Matthew Stafford (Matt Prater kick), 1:53. Lions 10–0. Drive: 8 plays, 76 yards, 4:53.
- DET – Calvin Johnson 17-yard pass from Matthew Stafford (Matt Prater kick), 1:08. Lions 17–0. Drive: 1 play, 17 yards, 0:06.

Second quarter

- No scoring plays.

Third quarter

- DET – Matt Prater 34-yard field goal, 8:58. Lions 20-0. Drive: 11 plays, 66 yards, 6:06.
- GB – Randall Cobb fumble recovery in end zone (Mason Crosby kick), 5:53. Lions 20–7. Drive: 7 plays, 75 yards, 3:10.
- GB – Davante Adams 8-yard pass from Aaron Rodgers (Mason Crosby kick), 4:12. Lions 20–14. Drive: 3 plays, 12 yards, 1:31.

Fourth quarter

- DET – Matt Prater 42-yard field goal, 7:11. Lions 23-14. Drive: 13 plays, 34 yards, 6:29.
- GB – Aaron Rodgers 17-yard run (Mason Crosby kick), 3:12. Lions 23–21. Drive: 11 plays, 84 yards, 4:02.
- GB – Richard Rodgers 61-yard pass from Aaron Rodgers (run failed), 0:00. Packers 27–23. Drive: 4 plays, 79 yards, 0:23.

Top passers

- GB – Aaron Rodgers – 24/36, 273 yards, 2 TD, INT
- DET – Matthew Stafford – 23/35, 220 yards, 2 TD

Top rushers

- GB – Aaron Rodgers – 4 rushes, 27 yards, TD
- DET – Ameer Abdullah – 13 rushes, 67 yards

Top receivers

- GB – Richard Rodgers – 8 receptions, 146 yards, TD
- DET – Golden Tate – 8 receptions, 63 yards

==== Week 14: vs. Dallas Cowboys ====
Week Fourteen: Dallas Cowboys at Green Bay Packers – Game summary

| Quarter | 1 | 2 | 3 | 4 | Total |
|---|---|---|---|---|---|
| Cowboys | 0 | 0 | 7 | 0 | 7 |
| Packers | 0 | 14 | 0 | 14 | 28 |

at Lambeau Field, Green Bay, Wisconsin

- Date: December 13
- Game time: 3:25 p.m. CST
- Game weather: 53 °F (12 °C), rain
- Game attendance: 78,369
- Referee: Brad Allen
- TV announcers (Fox): Joe Buck, Troy Aikman and Erin Andrews
- Recap, Gamebook

Game information

First quarter

- No scoring plays

Second quarter

- GB – James Starks 13-yard pass from Aaron Rodgers (Mason Crosby kick), 9:55. Packers 7–0. Drive: 9 plays, 48 yards, 4:14.
- GB – Richard Rodgers 3-yard pass from Aaron Rodgers (Mason Crosby kick), 2:45. Packers 14–0. Drive: 11 plays, 81 yards, 4:14.

Third quarter

- DAL – Robert Turbin 7-yard run (Dan Bailey kick), 8:28. Packers 14–7. Drive: 4 plays, 80 yards, 2:07.

Fourth quarter

- GB – James Starks 30-yard run (Mason Crosby kick), 4:50. Packers 21–7. Drive: 12 plays, 84 yards, 6:34.
- GB – Eddie Lacy 1-yard run (Mason Crosby kick), 2:50. Packers 28–7. Drive: 4 plays, 38 yards, 0:25.

Top passers

- DAL – Matt Cassel – 13/29, 114 yards, INT
- GB – Aaron Rodgers – 22/35, 218 yards, 2 TD

Top rushers

- DAL – Darren McFadden – 9 rushes, 111 yards
- GB – Eddie Lacy – 24 rushes, 124 yards, TD

Top receivers

- DAL – Jason Witten – 5 receptions, 40 yards
- GB – Randall Cobb – 8 receptions, 81 yards

Top tacklers

- DAL – Barry Church – 9 tackles, 2 assists
- GB – Clay Matthews III – 5 tackles, 1 assist (1 quarterback sack)

In a rematch of "Dez Bryant's no catch game", the Packers rattled the depleted Cowboys 28–7. This was the first game Mike McCarthy took back play-calling duties after relinquishing it to Tom Clements.

With the win, the Packers improved to 9–4.

==== Week 15: at Oakland Raiders ====
Week Fifteen: Green Bay Packers at Oakland Raiders – Game summary

| Quarter | 1 | 2 | 3 | 4 | Total |
|---|---|---|---|---|---|
| Packers | 14 | 0 | 10 | 6 | 30 |
| Raiders | 0 | 13 | 7 | 0 | 20 |

at O.co Coliseum, Oakland, California

- Date: December 20
- Game time: 3:05 p.m. CST/1:05 p.m. PST
- Game weather: 54 °F (12 °C), cloudy
- Game attendance: 55,087
- Referee: Walt Anderson
- TV announcers (Fox): Chris Myers, Ronde Barber and Jennifer Hale
- Recap, Gamebook

Game information

First quarter

- GB – John Kuhn 5-yard run, (Mason Crosby kick), 05:12. Drive: 4 plays, 17 yards, 01:12. (GB 7–0)
- GB – Damarious Randall 43-yard Interception return, (Mason Crosby kick), 05:03. (GB 14–0)

Second quarter

- OAK – Sebastian Janikowski 23-yard field goal, 14:56. Drive: 10 plays, 75 yards, 05:00. (GB 14–3)
- OAK – Sebastian Janikowski 30-yard field goal, 08:40. Drive: 10 plays, 66 yards, 03:57. (GB 14–6)
- OAK – Amari Cooper 19-yard pass from Derek Carr, (Sebastian Janikowski kick), 00:25. Drive: 4 plays, 79 yards, 01:02. (GB 14–13)

Third quarter

- GB – Mason Crosby 24-yard field goal, 10:21. Drive: 16 plays, 28 yards, 02:54. (GB 17–13)
- OAK – Amari Cooper 26-yard pass from Derek Carr, (Sebastian Janikowski kick), 06:54. Drive: 8 plays, 81 yards, 03:26. (OAK 20–17)
- GB – James Jones 30-yard pass from Aaron Rodgers, (Mason Crosby kick), 05:52. Drive: 3 plays, 53 yards, 00:56. (GB 24–20)

Fourth quarter

- GB – Mason Crosby 21-yard field goal, 10:04. Drive: 19 plays, 92 yards, 08:08. (GB 27–20)
- GB – Mason Crosby 33-yard field goal, 04:29. Drive: 6 plays, 31 yards, 02:25. (GB 30–20)

Top passers

- GB – Aaron Rodgers – 22/39, 204 Yds, 1 TD, 1 INT
- OAK – Derek Carr – 23/47, 276 Yds, 2 TDs, 2 INTs

Top rushers

- GB – James Starks – 9 Car, 51 Yds
- OAK – Latavius Murray – 21 Car, 78 Yds

Top receivers

- GB – James Jones – 6 Rec, 82 Yds, 1 TD
- OAK – Amari Cooper – 6 Rec, 120 Yds, 2 TDs

Top tacklers

- GB – Morgan Burnett – 7 Tackles, 1 Assist
- OAK – Malcolm Smith – 7 Tackles

The Packers would travel to Oakland to take on the Raiders. The defense had a good day, intercepting Derek Carr twice, as the Packers won 30–20.

With the win, the Packers improved to 10–4.

==== Week 16: at Arizona Cardinals ====
Week Sixteen: Green Bay Packers at Arizona Cardinals – Game summary

| Quarter | 1 | 2 | 3 | 4 | Total |
|---|---|---|---|---|---|
| Packers | 0 | 0 | 8 | 0 | 8 |
| Cardinals | 0 | 17 | 21 | 0 | 38 |

at University of Phoenix Stadium, Glendale, Arizona

- Date: December 27
- Game time: 3:25 p.m. CST/2:25 p.m. MST
- Game weather: Played indoors (retractable roof closed)
- Game attendance: 64,878
- Referee: Terry McAulay
- TV announcers (Fox): Joe Buck, Troy Aikman and Erin Andrews
- Recap, Gamebook

Game information

First quarter

- No scoring plays

Second quarter

- ARI – Larry Fitzgerald 3-yard pass from Carson Palmer, (Chandler Catanzaro kick), 14:11. Drive: 7 plays, 50 yards, 03:30. (ARI 7–0)
- ARI – Chandler Catanzaro 19-yard field goal, 05:51. Drive: 9 plays, 72 yards, 05:02. (ARI 10–0)
- ARI – John Brown 7-yard pass from Carson Palmer, (Chandler Catanzaro kick), 00:11. Drive: 7 plays, 80 yards, 00:51. (ARI 17–0)

Third quarter

- ARI – David Johnson 14-yard run, (Chandler Catanzaro kick), 14:10. Drive: 2 plays, 28 yards, 00:47. (ARI 24–0)
- ARI – Cory Redding 36-yard fumble return, (Chandler Catanzaro kick), 09:47. (ARI 31–0)
- GB – Eddie Lacy 28-yard pass from Aaron Rodgers, (Two-point conversion, James Jones pass from Aaron Rodgers), 06:41. Drive: 8 plays, 80 yards, 02:53. (ARI 31–8)
- ARI – Jerraud Powers 7-yard fumble return, (Chandler Catanzaro kick), 03:11. (ARI 38–8)

Fourth quarter

Top passers

- GB – Aaron Rodgers – 15/28, 151 Yds, 1 TD, 1 INT
- ARI – Carson Palmer – 18/27, 265 Yds, 2 TDs, 1 INT

Top rushers

- GB – Eddie Lacy – 12 Car, 60 Yds
- ARI – David Johnson – 9 Car, 39 Yds, 1 TD

Top receivers

- GB – James Jones – 5 Rec, 46 Yds
- ARI – Michael Floyd – 6 Rec, 111 Yds

Top tacklers

- GB – Morgan Burnett – 8 Tackles, 2 Assists
- ARI – Kevin Minter – 6 Tackles, 2 Assists

In this game, Aaron Rodgers had one of the poorest statistical performances of his career as the Green Bay Packers lost 38–8 to the Arizona Cardinals in Glendale. The Packers committed four turnovers, and Rodgers was sacked a career-high nine times.

With the loss, the Packers fell to 10–5 and would face the Minnesota Vikings the following week for the NFC North championship.

==== Week 17: vs. Minnesota Vikings ====
Week Seventeen: Minnesota Vikings at Green Bay Packers – Game summary

| Quarter | 1 | 2 | 3 | 4 | Total |
|---|---|---|---|---|---|
| Vikings | 3 | 3 | 14 | 0 | 20 |
| Packers | 3 | 0 | 0 | 10 | 13 |

at Lambeau Field, Green Bay, Wisconsin

- Date: January 3, 2016
- Game time: 7:30 p.m. CST
- Game weather: 24 °F (−4 °C), cloudy
- Game attendance: 78,412
- Referee: Bill Vinovich
- TV announcers (NBC): Al Michaels, Cris Collinsworth and Michele Tafoya
- Recap, Gamebook

Game information

First quarter

- MIN – Blair Walsh 39-yard field goal, 10:49. Drive: 10 plays, 59 yards, 04:15. (MIN 3–0)
- GB – Mason Crosby 28-yard field goal, 02:06. Drive: 15 plays, 70 yards, 08:43. (3–3)

Second quarter

- MIN – Blair Walsh 32-yard field goal, 02:58. Drive: 8 plays, 43 yards, 03:37. (MIN 6–3)

Third quarter

- MIN – Adrian Peterson 3-yard run, (Blair Walsh kick), 10:37. Drive: 6 plays, 58 yards, 02:55. (MIN 13–3)
- MIN – Captain Munnerlyn 55-yard fumble return, (Blair Walsh kick), 04:42. (MIN 20–3)

Fourth quarter

- GB – Richard Rodgers 16-yard pass from Aaron Rodgers, (Mason Crosby kick), 13:37. Drive: 14 plays, 80 yards, 06:01. (MIN 20–10)
- GB – Mason Crosby 43-yard field goal, 05:39. Drive: 8 plays, 59 yards, 04:25. (MIN 20–13)

Top passers

- MIN – Teddy Bridgewater – 10/19, 99 Yds, 1 INT
- GB – Aaron Rodgers – 28/44, 291 Yds, 1 TD, 1 INT

Top rushers

- MIN – Adrian Peterson – 19 Car, 67 Yds, 1 TD
- GB – Eddie Lacy – 13 Car, 34 Yds

Top receivers

- MIN – Jerick McKinnon – 3 Rec, 33 Yds
- GB – James Jones – 4 Rec, 102 Yds

Top tacklers

- MIN – Andrew Sendejo – 8 Tackles, 5 Assists
- GB – Morgan Burnett – 5 Tackles, 3 Assists

The Green Bay Packers entered the game seeking a season sweep of the Minnesota Vikings and the NFC North title. Late in the fourth quarter, quarterback Aaron Rodgers attempted a Hail Mary pass that was tipped by the Vikings defense and fell incomplete, allowing Minnesota to secure the division title for the first time since 2009 and ending Green Bay’s run of four consecutive division championships. The defeat also marked the first time in franchise history that the Packers went 0–3 at home against NFC North opponents in a single season.

The loss dropped Green Bay to 10–6 and left them with a 1–1 record against each of their divisional rivals.

=== Postseason ===
==== NFC Wild Card Playoffs: at (4) Washington Redskins ====
NFC Wild Card Playoffs: (5) Green Bay Packers at (4) Washington Redskins – Game summary

| Quarter | 1 | 2 | 3 | 4 | Total |
|---|---|---|---|---|---|
| Packers | 0 | 17 | 7 | 11 | 35 |
| Redskins | 5 | 6 | 7 | 0 | 18 |

at FedExField, Landover, Maryland

- Date: January 10, 2016
- Game time: 4:40 p.m. EST/3:40 p.m. CST
- Game weather: 61 °F (16 °C), cloudy
- Game attendance: 81,367
- Referee: Gene Steratore
- TV announcers (Fox): Joe Buck, Troy Aikman, Erin Andrews and Chris Myers
- Recap, Gamebook

Game information

First quarter

- WAS – Safety (Aaron Rodgers tackled by Preston Smith), 10:33. (WAS 2–0)
- WAS – Dustin Hopkins 25-yard field goal, 04:54. Drive: 10 plays, 48 yards, 05:36. (WAS 5–0)

Second quarter

- WAS – Jordan Reed 24-yard pass from Kirk Cousins, 13:07. Drive: 7 plays, 64 yards, 03:22. (WAS 11–0)
- GB – Randall Cobb 12-yard pass from Aaron Rodgers, (Mason Crosby kick), 09:09. Drive: 9 plays, 80 yards, 03:58. (WAS 11–7)
- GB – Mason Crosby 43-yard field goal, 02:57. Drive: 8 plays, 30 yards, 03:11. (WAS 11–10)
- GB – Davante Adams 10-yard pass from Aaron Rodgers, (Mason Crosby kick), 00:33. Drive: 9 plays, 60 yards, 01:54. (GB 17–11)

Third quarter

- WAS – Kirk Cousins 3-yard run, (Dustin Hopkins kick), 09:44. Drive: 9 plays, 73 yards, 05:19. (WAS 18–17)
- GB – James Starks 4-yard run, (Mason Crosby kick), 04:18. Drive: 11 plays, 80 yards, 05:29. (GB 24–18)

Fourth quarter

- GB – Eddie Lacy 2-yard run, Two-point conversion, (Jared Abbrederis pass from Aaron Rodgers), 12:27. Drive: 10 plays, 76 yards, 05:39. (GB 32–18)
- GB – Mason Crosby 29-yard field goal, 04:43. Drive: 4 plays, 6 yards, 00:19. (GB 35–18)

Top passers

- GB – Aaron Rodgers – 21/36, 210 Yds, 2 TDs
- WAS – Kirk Cousins – 29/46, 329 Yds, 1 TD

Top rushers

- GB – Eddie Lacy – 12 Car, 63 Yds, 1 TD
- WAS – Alfred Morris – 11 Car, 50 Yds

Top receivers

- GB – James Jones – 7 Rec, 81 Yds
- WAS – Jordan Reed – 9 Rec, 120 Yds, 1 TD

Top tacklers

- GB – Morgan Burnett – 5 Tackles, 6 Assists
- WAS – Will Blackmon – 6 Tackles, 2 Assists

The Packers would play in Washington for the first playoff game. The first half was all Redskins, as they jumped out to an 11–0 lead during the early point of the second quarter. However, the Packers would come back, and would outscore Washington 35-7 the rest of the game.

With the win, the Packers advanced to the Divisional Playoffs.

==== NFC Divisional Playoffs: at (2) Arizona Cardinals ====
NFC Divisional Playoffs: (5) Green Bay Packers at (2) Arizona Cardinals – Game summary

| Quarter | 1 | 2 | 3 | 4 | OT | Total |
|---|---|---|---|---|---|---|
| Packers | 0 | 6 | 7 | 7 | 0 | 20 |
| Cardinals | 7 | 0 | 3 | 10 | 6 | 26 |

at University of Phoenix Stadium, Glendale, Arizona

- Date: January 16, 2016
- Game time: 7:15 p.m. CST/6:15 p.m. MST
- Game weather: Played indoors (retractable roof closed)
- Game attendance: 65,089
- Referee: Clete Blakeman
- TV announcers (NBC): Al Michaels, Cris Collinsworth and Michele Tafoya
- Recap, Gamebook

Game information

First quarter

- ARI – Michael Floyd 8-yard pass from Carson Palmer, (Chandler Catanzaro kick), 06:58. Drive: 11 plays, 42 yards, 06:21. (Cardinals 7–0)

Second quarter

- GB – Mason Crosby 28-yard field goal, 11:27. Drive: 17 plays, 85 yards, 07:21. (ARI 7–3)
- GB – Mason Crosby 34-yard field goal, 01:01. Drive: 17 plays, 71 yards, 07:55. (ARI 7–6)

Third quarter

- GB – Jeff Janis 8-yard pass from Aaron Rodgers, (Mason Crosby kick), 10:25. Drive: 6 plays, 81 yards, 03:05. (GB 13–7)
- ARI – Chandler Catanzaro 28-yard field goal, 05:09. Drive: 10 plays, 74 yards, 05:12. (GB 13–10)

Fourth quarter

- ARI – Michael Floyd 9-yard pass from Carson Palmer, (Chandler Catanzaro kick), 03:50. Drive: 14 plays, 80 yards, 07:09. (ARI 17–13)
- ARI – Chandler Catanzaro 36-yard field goal, 02:00. Drive: 4 plays, 6 yards, 00:43. (ARI 20–13)
- GB – Jeff Janis 41-yard pass from Aaron Rodgers, (Mason Crosby kick), 00:05. Drive: 6 plays, 86 yards, 01:55. (Tied 20–20)

Overtime

- ARI – Larry Fitzgerald 5-yard pass from Carson Palmer, 14:00. Drive: 3 plays, 80 yards, 01:05. (ARI 26–20)

Top passers

- GB – Aaron Rodgers – 24/44, 261 Yds, 2 TDs, 1 INT
- ARI – Carson Palmer – 25/41, 349 yards, 3 TDs, 2 INTs

Top rushers

- GB – Eddie Lacy – 12 Car, 89 Yds
- ARI – David Johnson – 15 Car, 35 Yds

Top receivers

- GB – Jeff Janis – 7 Rec, 145 Yds, 2 TDs
- ARI – Larry Fitzgerald – 8 Rec, 176 Yds, 1 TD

Top tacklers

- GB – Clay Matthews III – 5 Tackles, 1 Assist
- ARI – Tony Jefferson – 8 Tackles, 1 Assist

In a rematch of week 16's game, the Packers went back to Arizona for a showdown with the Cardinals. This game was a lot closer, as the Packers lost a wild shootout 26–20 in overtime. In the fourth quarter, trailing by 7 with less than 2 minutes left, facing a 4th and 20, the Packers converted with Rodgers completing a 61-yard pass to receiver Jeff Janis to set the Packers up. Later, with 5 seconds left, Aaron Rodgers would throw another Hail Mary pass, this time to Janis, and to tie the game at 20. In overtime, the Cardinals would get the ball first. On the first play from scrimmage, Carson Palmer would complete a pass to Larry Fitzgerald, who was able to run through the Packers defense for a gain of 75 yards and be tackled at the Green Bay 4 yard line. Two plays later, the Cardinals would win it after Fitzgerald took it in on a flip from Palmer to end the game and send Arizona to the NFC Championship game.

With the loss, the Packers ended their season with an overall record of 11–7.

== Statistics ==
=== Regular season statistical leaders ===
| | Player(s) | Value |
|---|---|---|
| Passing yards | Aaron Rodgers | 3821 Yards |
| Passing touchdowns | Aaron Rodgers | 31 |
| Rushing yards | Eddie Lacy | 758 Yards |
| Rushing touchdowns | Eddie Lacy | 3 |
| Receptions | Randall Cobb | 79 Receptions |
| Receiving yards | James Jones | 890 Yards |
| Receiving touchdowns | Richard Rodgers; James Jones | 8 |
| Kickoff Return Yards | Jeff Janis | 406 yards |
| Punt return Yards | Micah Hyde | 184 yards |
| Tackles | Ha Ha Clinton-Dix | 100 tackles |
| Sacks | Julius Peppers | 10.5 sacks |
| Interceptions | Micah Hyde; Damarious Randall; Sam Shields | 3 INTs |

Statistical values are correct through Week 17
*leads the league in statistical category

=== Best game performances ===
| | Player(s) | Value | Opponent |
|---|---|---|---|
| Passing yards | Aaron Rodgers | 369 yards | @ Carolina Panthers |
| Passing touchdowns | Aaron Rodgers | 5 | Kansas City Chiefs |
| Rushing yards | Eddie Lacy | 124 yards | Dallas Cowboys |
| Rushing touchdowns | Eddie Lacy; Eddie Lacy; John Kuhn; James Starks; Aaron Rodgers; Eddie Lacy; James Starks; John Kuhn | 1 | @ Chicago Bears @ Denver Broncos @ San Francisco 49ers San Diego Chargers; Detroit Lions; Dallas Cowboys; Dallas Cowboys @ Oakland Raiders |
| Receiving yards | Richard Rodgers | 146 yards | Detroit Lions |
| Receiving touchdowns | Randall Cobb | 3 | Kansas City Chiefs |
| Tackles | Ha Ha Clinton-Dix; Micah Hyde; Nate Palmer; Ha Ha Clinton-Dix | 9 tackles | Seattle Seahawks; San Diego Chargers; San Diego Chargers; Detroit Lions |
| Sacks | Julius Peppers | 2.5 sacks | @ Oakland Raiders |
| Interceptions | Quinten Rollins | 2 INT | St. Louis Rams |

Statistical values are correct through Week 17

== Awards ==
| Recipient | Award(s) |
|---|---|
| Mason Crosby | Week 11: Special Teams Player of the Week |
| Eddie Lacy | Week 14: FedEx Ground Player of the Week |
| Damarious Randall | Week 6: Castrol Edge Clutch Performer; November: Rookie of the Month |
| Aaron Rodgers | Week 3: NFC Offensive Player of the Week; Week 3: FedEx Air Player of the Week; Week 11: Castrol Edge Clutch Performer |

== See also ==
- 2015 NFL season
- Miracle in Motown (Week 13)
