= Mike Daniels (American football) =

American football player (born 1989)

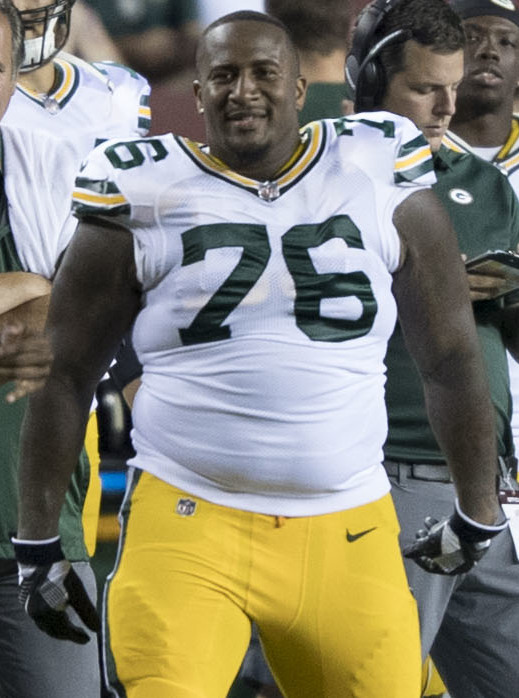
- Daniels with the Green Bay Packers in 2017

No. 76, 96
- Position: Defensive tackle

Personal information
- Born: May 5, 1989 (age 37); Stratford, New Jersey, U.S.
- Listed height: 6 ft 0 in (1.83 m)
- Listed weight: 310 lb (141 kg)

Career information
- High school: Highland Regional (Blackwood, New Jersey)
- College: Iowa (2007–2011)
- NFL draft: 2012: 4th round, 132nd overall pick

Career history
- Green Bay Packers (2012–2018); Detroit Lions (2019); Cincinnati Bengals (2020–2021)

Awards and highlights
- Pro Bowl (2017); Second-team All-Big Ten (2011)

Career NFL statistics
- Total tackles: 257
- Sacks: 30.0
- Pass deflections: 5
- Interceptions: 1
- Forced fumbles: 2
- Stats at Pro Football Reference

Michael Wayne Daniels Jr. (born May 5, 1989) is an American former professional football player who was a defensive tackle in the National Football League (NFL). He played college football for the Iowa Hawkeyes and was selected by the Green Bay Packers in the fourth round of the 2012 NFL draft.

== Early life ==
Daniels was born in Stratford, New Jersey to Carlene and Michael Daniels.

He attended Highland Regional High School in Gloucester Township, New Jersey, where he played running back and defensive tackle. During his second year, he had 41 tackles and six sacks. In his junior year he had 84 tackles and nine sacks. During his senior year, Daniels had 97 tackles and 12 sacks, which earned him first-team all-conference honors. He was also twice named a team captain and rushed for 2,203 yards in his career while scoring 25 touchdowns. Daniels was also a three-year letterman in wrestling and state qualifier in the discus (43.77m or 143’06) and threw the shot put (17.95m or 58’09) at the New Jersey Meet of Champions.

== College career ==
Daniels was considered a two-star prospect by Rivals.com. His height was listed at six feet one inches and 230 pounds. His 40-yard dash was listed at 4.6 seconds; he bench-pressed a maximum of 300 pounds and squatted 600 pounds.

Daniels was not highly recruited out of high school, but received scholarship offers from the University of Iowa and Temple University. When he was asked about why no one knew about him coming out of high school, he replied, "honestly, I don't know".

Daniels chose to play football at Iowa and was redshirted during his first year. When the redshirt expired the following year, he was not listed on the depth chart after spring practice but still managed to get the first sack of his college career in a game against the Florida International University Golden Panthers, in which he also had two solo tackles and an assisted tackle.

During his second year, Daniels played in all 13 games, and had 10 tackles including 1.5 for a loss.

In his junior year with the Hawkeyes, Daniels played in every game and started eight of them. During a game against Ball State, he was awarded a career-best six tackles (four solo), as well as four more tackles for a loss and a sack. His performance earned him Big Ten co-Defensive Player of the week honors. At the end of the season, he earned a spot on the honorable mention All-Big Ten team by the coaches and media.

During the final season of his college career, Daniels was named to the Pony Express Award preseason watch list. Additionally, he was named a third-team All-Big 10 by Phil Steele. During the season, he started all 13 games at defensive tackle and led the team in tackles for loss and sacks. He also recorded 32 solo tackles. During the season opener against Tennessee Tech, he recorded one solo tackle and one assist. When the Hawkeyes competed against Nebraska, Daniels matched his career high of nine tackles. His performance in his final year earned him a spot on the second-team all-Big Ten team by the coaches and media.

Daniels graduated from the University of Iowa with a degree in sociology.

== Professional career ==
Pre-draft measurables
Height	Weight	Arm length	Hand span	Wingspan	40-yard dash
6 ft 0 1/2 in (1.84 m)	291 lb (132 kg)	32 1/2 in (0.83 m)	9 5/8 in (0.24 m)	6 ft 4 7/8 in (1.95 m)	4.84 s
All values from NFL Combine

=== Green Bay Packers ===
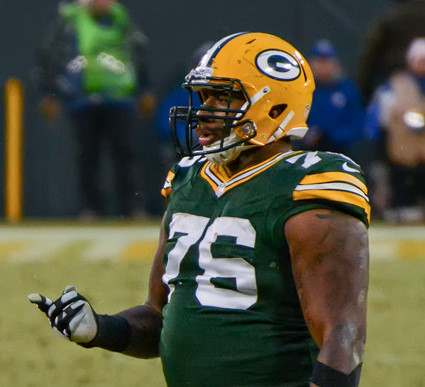
Daniels with the Green Bay Packers in 2014

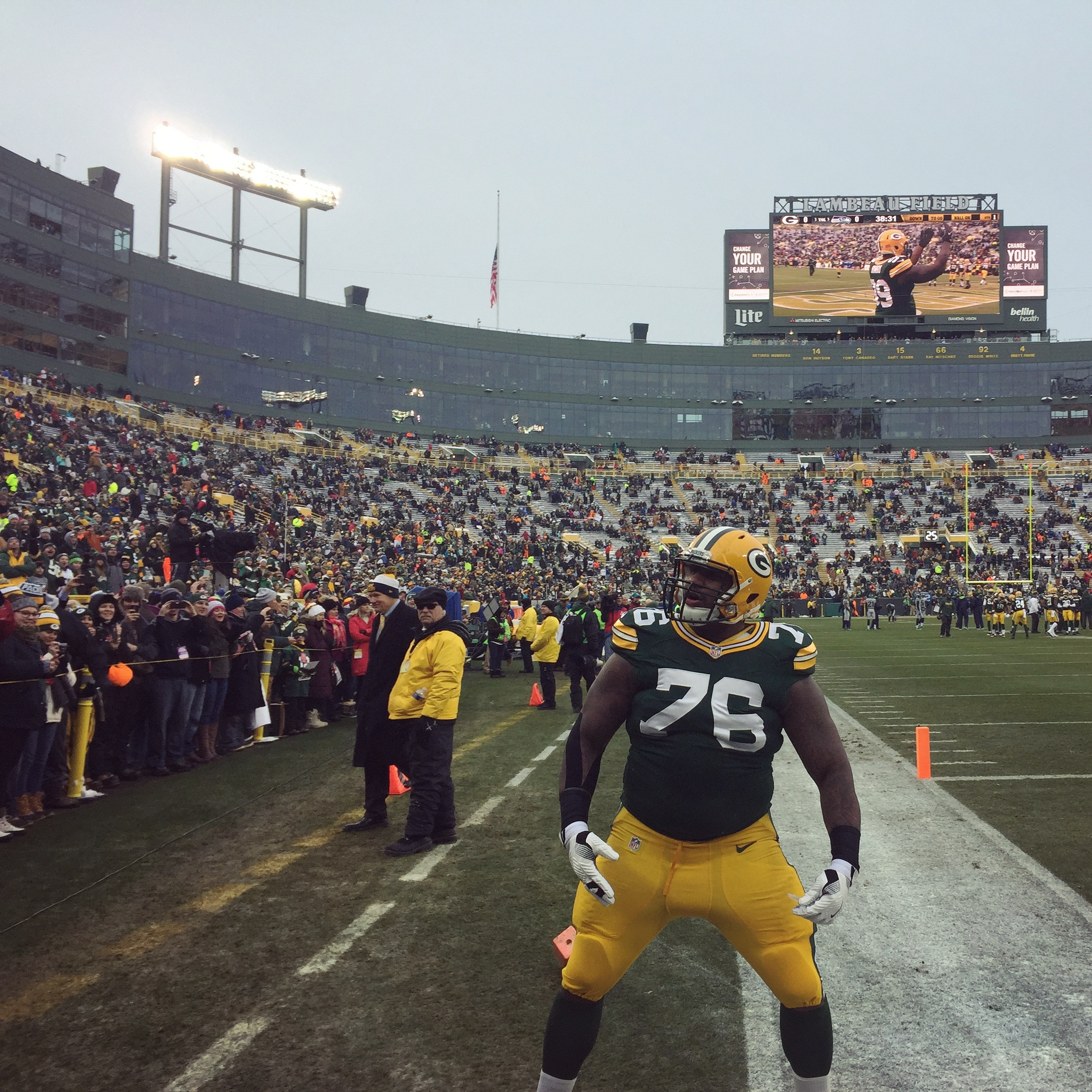
Daniels interacting with the crowd at Lambeau Field in December 2016

Scouts praised Daniels for being "quick off the ball" and using "his small frame to work between blockers". They also stated that he had good instincts and could understand offensive schemes and beat them. His size was often criticized because he was often beaten by larger blockers.

Daniels was selected in the fourth round (132nd overall) of the 2012 draft by the Green Bay Packers who first noticed him a year before when looking at other defensive linemen from Iowa. Defensive coordinator Dom Capers commented that "The thing that jumps out at me is the way he plays the game." He scored his first touchdown on December 9, 2012 against the Lions after recovering a fumble by Matthew Stafford. During his rookie season in 2012, Daniels played 14 games with 12 tackles, 2 sacks, 1 pass defended, and 2 fumble recoveries. In 2013, Daniels appeared in 16 games making 28 tackles and 6.5 sacks. In 2014, Daniels started all 16 games with 47 tackles and 5.5 sacks. On December 14, 2015, Daniels signed a 4-year contract extension worth $42 million. On December 27, 2015, despite the Packers' bad performance on the offensive line and being blown out 38–8 by the Arizona Cardinals, Daniels snagged his first interception from Carson Palmer. Daniels finished the 2015 season with 49 tackles, 4 sacks, 1 interception, 2 passes defended, and 1 forced fumble.

Daniels was ranked 95th by his fellow players on the NFL Top 100 Players of 2016, and 84th on the NFL Top 100 Players of 2017 after starting all 16 games both seasons.

In Week 1 of the 2017 season, Daniels recorded seven tackles, 1.5 sacks, and a forced fumble off of quarterback Russell Wilson in a 17–9 win over the Seattle Seahawks. Daniels's forced fumble was vital as it helped set up a Ty Montgomery rushing touchdown.

Daniels was named to his first Pro Bowl after the 2017 regular season. Having been an alternate three previous occasions in his career, on January 9, 2018, the NFL announced that Daniels would replace Aaron Donald in the 2018 Pro Bowl due to an undisclosed injury. He was ranked 93rd by his peers on the NFL Top 100 Players of 2018.

In 2018, Daniels played in 10 games, recording 18 tackles and two sacks before suffering a foot injury in Week 11. He was placed on injured reserve on December 1, 2018.

On July 24, 2019, Daniels was released by the Packers after seven seasons.

=== Detroit Lions ===
Two days later, Daniels signed a one-year, $9.1 million contract with the Detroit Lions. He played in nine games before being placed on injured reserve on December 16, 2019.

=== Cincinnati Bengals ===
Daniels signed with the Cincinnati Bengals on August 12, 2020. He was placed on injured reserve on October 3, 2020, with an elbow injury. He was activated on October 24. He was placed on the reserve/COVID-19 list by the team on January 2, 2021, and activated on January 12.

Daniels re-signed on a one-year contract with the Bengals on March 31, 2021. He was released on August 31, 2021. He was signed to the practice squad on September 6.

== NFL career statistics ==
Regular season statistics
Season	Team	Games		Tackles				
Season	Team	GP	GS	Total	Solo	Ast	Sck	Int
2012	GB	14	0	12	12	0	2.0	0
2013	GB	16	1	23	17	6	6.5	0
2014	GB	16	16	41	29	12	5.5	0
2015	GB	16	16	49	27	22	4.0	1
2016	GB	16	16	33	25	8	4.0	0
2017	GB	14	14	49	34	15	5.0	0
2018	GB	10	9	18	10	8	2.0	0
2019	DET	9	2	10	6	4	1.0	0
2020	CIN	11	11	17	7	10	0.0	0
2021	CIN	2	1	5	5	0	0.0	0
Total		124	86	257	172	85	30.0	1
Source: NFL.com

Postseason statistics
Season	Team	Games		Tackles				
Season	Team	GP	GS	Total	Solo	Ast	Sck	Int
2012	GB	2	0	3	2	1	0.0	0
2013	GB	1	1	5	3	2	1.0	0
2014	GB	2	2	6	1	5	0.5	0
2015	GB	2	2	3	2	1	1.0	0
2016	GB	3	3	10	9	1	0.0	0
2021	CIN	1	0	0	0	0	0.0	0
Total		11	8	27	17	10	2.5	0
Source: pro-football-reference.com

== Personal life ==
Daniels is a Christian. Daniels is married to Heaven Daniels. They have five children. Daniels is the older brother of Sean Daniels. He has been noted for his interest in anime.
