= Chris Banjo =

American football player (born 1990)

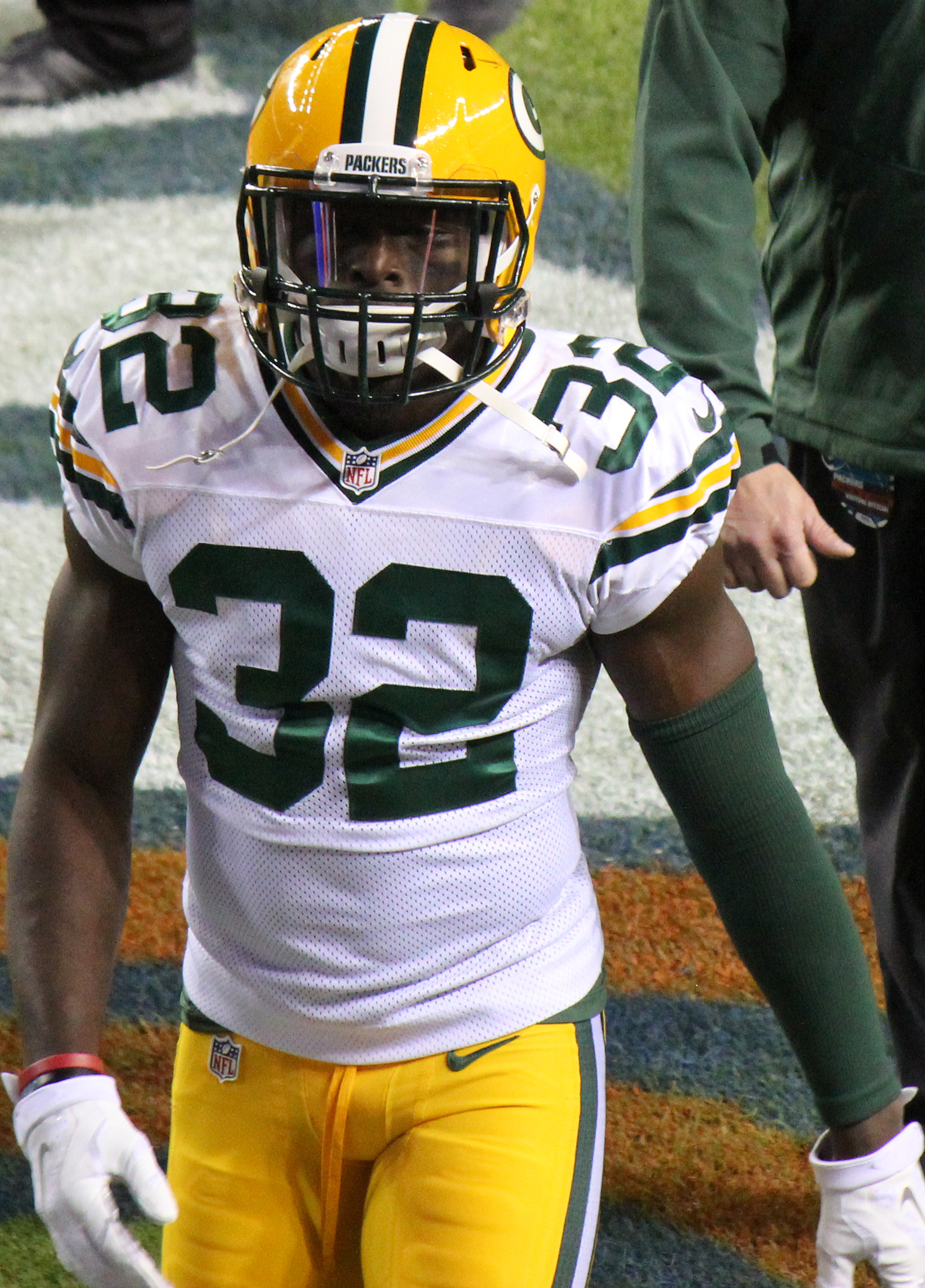
- Banjo with the Green Bay Packers in 2015

New York Jets
- Title: Special teams coordinator

Personal information
- Born: February 26, 1990 (age 36); Houston, Texas, U.S.
- Listed height: 5 ft 10 in (1.78 m)
- Listed weight: 207 lb (94 kg)

Career information
- Position: Safety (No. 32, 37, 31, 38)
- High school: Kempner (Sugar Land, Texas)
- College: SMU (2008–2011)
- NFL draft: 2012: undrafted

Career history

Playing
- Jacksonville Jaguars (2013)*; Green Bay Packers (2013–2016); New Orleans Saints (2016–2018); Arizona Cardinals (2019–2022)
- * Offseason or practice squad member only

Coaching
- Denver Broncos (2023–2024) Assistant special teams coach; New York Jets (2025–present) Special teams coordinator

Awards and highlights
- Second-team All-C-USA (2010)

Career NFL statistics
- Total tackles: 143
- Forced fumbles: 1
- Fumble recoveries: 2
- Interceptions: 3
- Defensive touchdowns: 1
- Stats at Pro Football Reference

Ayokunmi Christopher Oluwaseun Banjo (born February 26, 1990) is an American professional football coach and former safety who is the special teams coordinator for the New York Jets of the National Football League (NFL). He played college football for the SMU Mustangs. Banjo was signed by the Jacksonville Jaguars as an undrafted free agent in 2013. He has also played for the Green Bay Packers, New Orleans Saints, and Arizona Cardinals.

== College career ==
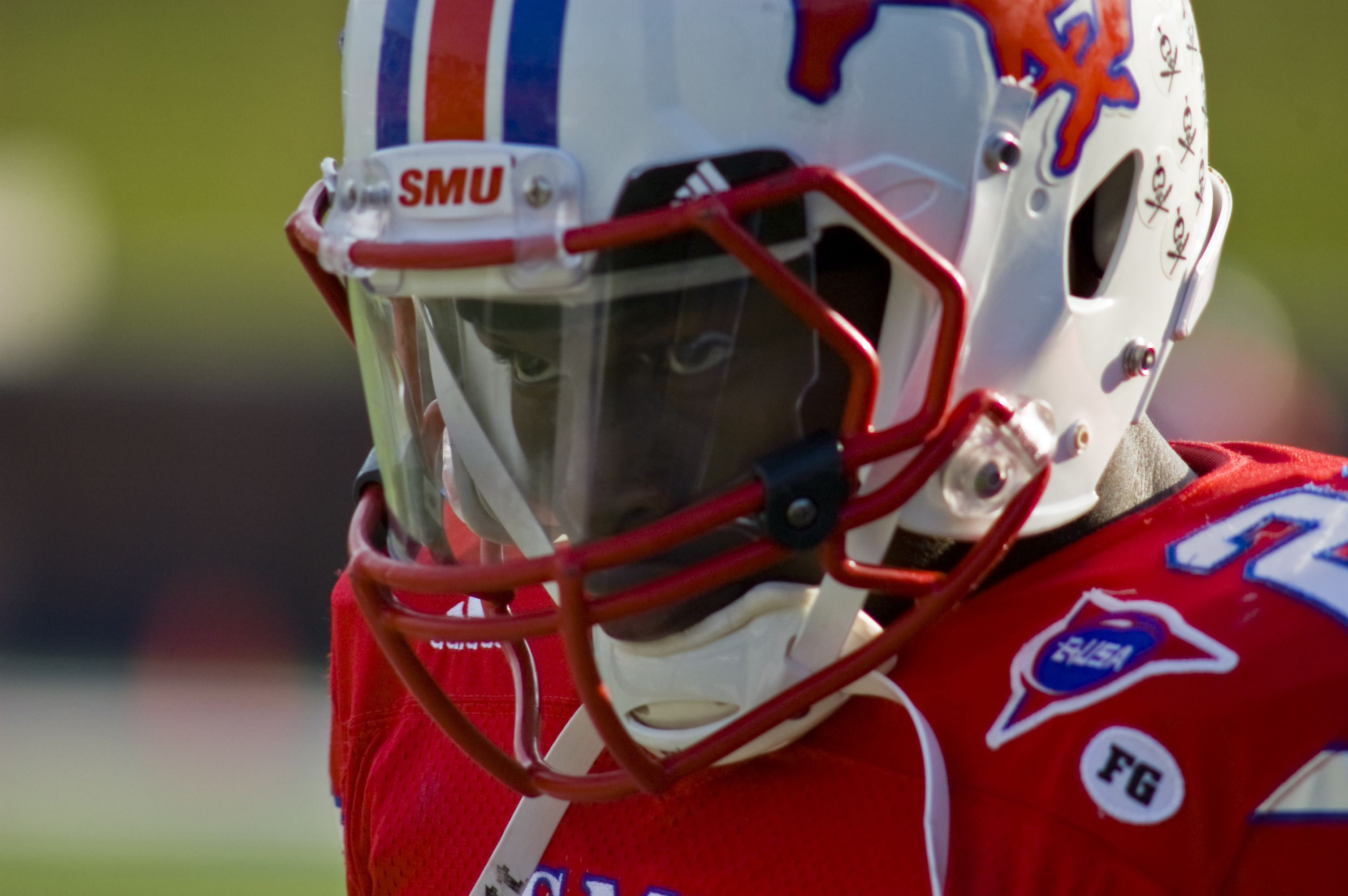
Banjo during his tenure at SMU

Banjo attended Southern Methodist University, where he played for the Mustangs from 2008 to 2011.

=== Statistics ===
Season	Team	Games		Tackles				Interceptions						Fumbles	
Season	Team	GP	GS	Cmb	Solo	Ast	Sck	PD	Int	Yds	Avg	Lng	TD	FF	FR
2008	SMU	12	8	61	40	21	0.0	0	1	33	33.0	33	0	0	0
2009	SMU	13	13	86	45	41	0.0	5	1	16	16.0	16	0	3	1
2010	SMU	14	14	92	60	32	0.0	8	2	25	12.5	25	0	0	0
2011	SMU	12	12	82	50	32	0.0	2	0	0	0.0	0	0	0	2
Career		51	47	321	195	126	0.0	15	4	74	18.5	33	0	3	3

== Professional career ==
Pre-draft measurables
Height	Weight	40-yard dash	10-yard split	20-yard split	20-yard shuttle	Three-cone drill	Vertical jump	Broad jump	Bench press
5 ft 9 3/4 in (1.77 m)	206 lb (93 kg)	4.50 s	1.57 s	2.58 s	4.27 s	7.19 s	39.5 in (1.00 m)	10 ft 4 in (3.15 m)	23 reps
All values from Pro Day

=== Jacksonville Jaguars ===
After going undrafted in the 2012 NFL draft, Banjo signed with the Jacksonville Jaguars on April 18, 2013. On July 25, 2013, he was released by the Jaguars.

=== Green Bay Packers ===
On July 29, 2013, Banjo was signed by the Green Bay Packers.

He was re-signed by the Packers on February 26, 2014. On August 30, 2014, Banjo was released by the Packers during final team cuts. He was signed to the Packers' practice squad the following day. On December 13, 2014, Banjo was promoted from the practice squad to the active roster.

He was re-signed by the Packers on March 10, 2015. Banjo was elected by teammates as a playoff captain after leading the team in special teams tackles in the 2015 season.

On March 8, 2016, Banjo was re-signed by the Packers. He was placed on injured reserve on October 24, 2016. On October 31, 2016, Banjo was waived by the Packers after reaching an injury settlement.

=== New Orleans Saints ===
On November 15, 2016, Banjo was signed by the New Orleans Saints. On March 7, 2017, Banjo signed a two-year contract extension with the Saints.

On March 9, 2019, Banjo signed a three-year contract extension with the Saints. He was released on August 31, 2019.

=== Arizona Cardinals ===
On September 25, 2019, Banjo was signed by the Arizona Cardinals.

On April 2, 2020, Banjo was re-signed by the Cardinals. He was placed on the reserve/COVID-19 list by the team on December 31, 2020, and activated on January 5, 2021.

On March 31, 2021, Banjo was re-signed by the Cardinals to a one-year contract. He was released on August 31, 2021 and re-signed to the practice squad the next day. He was promoted to the active roster on October 4, 2021.

On September 29, 2022, Banjo was signed to the Arizona Cardinals practice squad after going unsigned in the offseason. He was signed to the active roster on October 12.

On February 26, 2023, Banjo's 33rd birthday, he announced on his Twitter account his retirement from the NFL after 10 seasons.

== NFL career statistics ==
Regular season
Year	Team	Games		Tackles				Interceptions						Fumbles	
Year	Team	GP	GS	Cmb	Solo	Ast	Sck	PD	Int	Yds	Avg	Lng	TD	FF	FR
2013	GB	16	1	19	17	2	0.0	2	0	0	0.0	0	0	0	0
2014	GB	3	0	1	1	0	0.0	0	0	0	0.0	0	0	0	0
2015	GB	16	1	16	15	1	0.0	1	0	0	0.0	0	0	0	0
2016	GB	2	0	2	2	0	0.0	0	0	0	0.0	0	0	0	0
2016	NO	7	0	5	5	0	0.0	0	0	0	0.0	0	0	0	0
2017	NO	16	0	12	10	2	0.0	1	1	0	0.0	0	0	1	1
2018	NO	16	0	10	8	2	0.0	3	2	0	0.0	0	0	0	0
2019	ARI	13	0	12	6	6	0.0	0	0	0	0.0	0	0	0	0
2020	ARI	13	4	48	34	14	0.0	1	0	0	0.0	0	0	0	0
2021	ARI	16	0	7	4	3	0.0	0	0	0	0.0	0	0	0	0
2022	ARI	13	1	11	6	5	0.0	0	0	0	0.0	0	0	0	1
Career		131	7	143	108	35	0.0	8	3	0	0.0	0	0	1	2

Playoffs
Year	Team	Games		Tackles				Interceptions						Fumbles	
Year	Team	GP	GS	Cmb	Solo	Ast	Sck	PD	Int	Yds	Avg	Lng	TD	FF	FR
2013	GB	1	0	0	0	0	0.0	0	0	0	0.0	0	0	0	0
2014	GB	2	0	2	1	1	0.0	0	0	0	0.0	0	0	0	0
2015	GB	2	0	2	2	0	0.0	0	0	0	0.0	0	0	0	0
2017	NO	2	0	0	0	0	0.0	0	0	0	0.0	0	0	0	0
2018	NO	2	0	1	1	0	0.0	0	0	0	0.0	0	0	0	0
2021	ARI	1	0	0	0	0	0.0	0	0	0	0.0	0	0	0	0
Career		10	0	5	4	1	0.0	0	0	0	0.0	0	0	0	0

== Coaching career ==
=== Denver Broncos ===
The Denver Broncos announced the hiring of Banjo as an assistant special teams coach under new head coach Sean Payton on February 25, 2023.

=== New York Jets ===
On January 31, 2025, Banjo was hired to serve as the New York Jets' special teams coordinator.

== Personal life ==
Banjo was born to Nigerian parents who migrated to Houston. His mother died in 2010.

His name "Oluwaseun" means "We thank God" in Yoruba.
