= Sean Richardson (American football) =

American football player (born 1990)

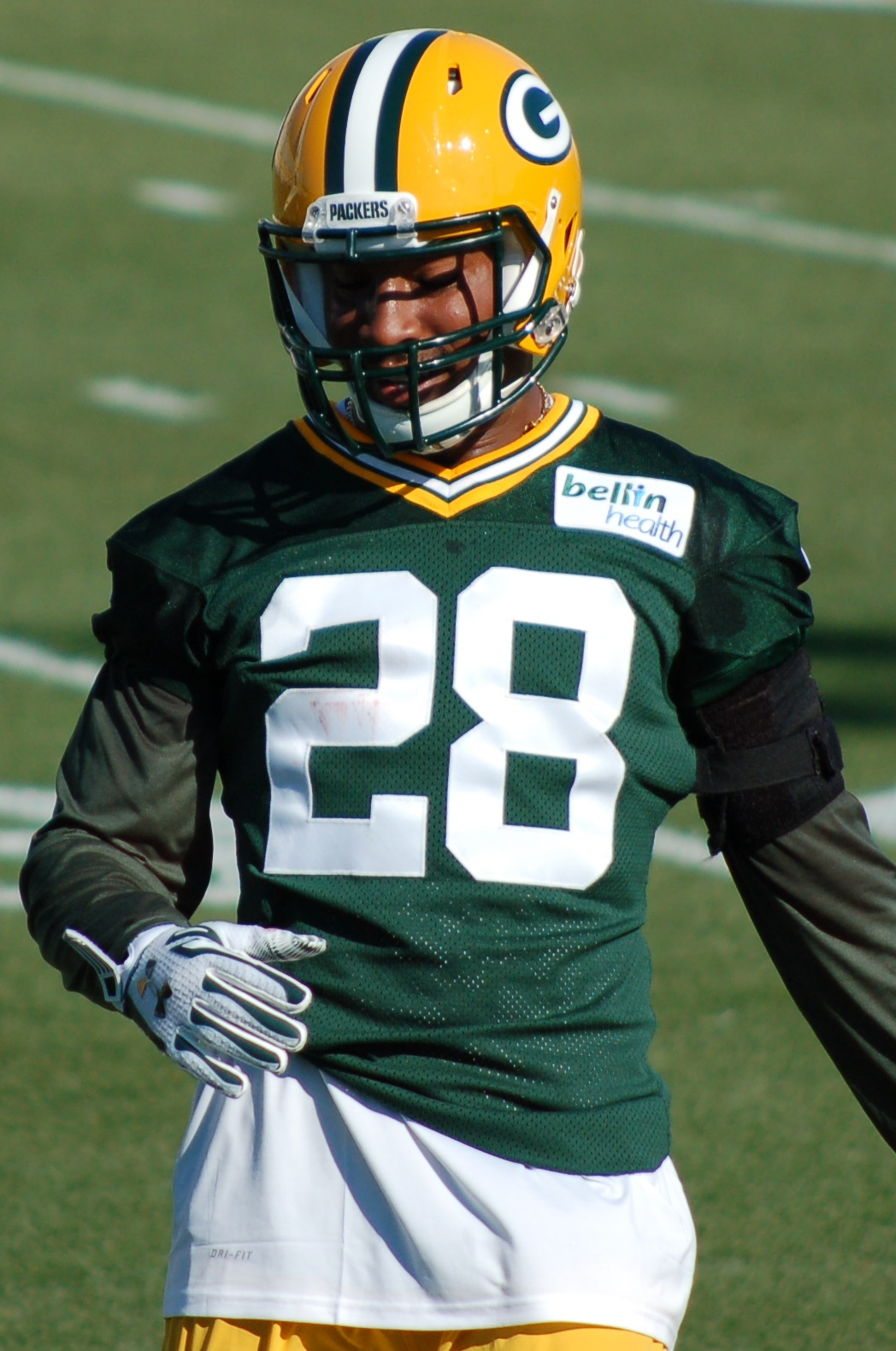
- Richardson with the Packers in 2015

No. 28
- Position: Safety

Personal information
- Born: January 20, 1990 (age 36); Fort Campbell, Kentucky, U.S.
- Listed height: 6 ft 2 in (1.88 m)
- Listed weight: 216 lb (98 kg)

Career information
- High school: Linden (AL)
- College: Vanderbilt
- NFL draft: 2012: undrafted

Career history
- Green Bay Packers (2012–2015)

Career NFL statistics
- Total tackles: 44
- Stats at Pro Football Reference

Seandre Antonio Richardson (born January 21, 1990) is an American former professional football player who was a safety for the Green Bay Packers of the National Football League (NFL). He played college football for the Vanderbilt Commodores and was signed by the Packers as an undrafted free agent in 2012.

== College career ==
Richardson played college football at Vanderbilt University. He was a three-year starter for the Commodores, playing alongside former Packer teammate Casey Hayward. In his three seasons as a starter, he recorded 194 tackles (including 11.5 for loss), one interception, and a fumble recovery for a touchdown.

== Professional career ==
After going undrafted in the 2012 NFL draft, Richardson signed with the Green Bay Packers on May 11, 2012. He earned a spot on the Packers' 53-man roster in 2012.

=== NFL statistics ===
==== Regular season ====
Season	Team	Games		Tackles				
Season	Team	GP	GS	Total	Solo	Ast	Sck	Int
2012	Green Bay Packers	5	0	1	0	1	0	0
2013	Green Bay Packers	6	0	15	11	4	0	0
2014	Green Bay Packers	16	0	26	22	4	0	0
2015	Green Bay Packers	3	1	3	3	0	0	0
	Total	30	1	44	36	8	0	0

==== Postseason ====
Season	Team	Games		Tackles				
Season	Team	GP	GS	Total	Solo	Ast	Sck	Int
2013	Green Bay Packers	1	0	2	1	1	0	0
2014	Green Bay Packers	2	0	1	0	1	0	0
	Total	3	0	3	1	2	0	0
