= Quinten Rollins =

American football player (born 1992)

No. 24
- Position: Cornerback

Personal information
- Born: July 15, 1992 (age 34); Canton, Ohio, U.S.
- Listed height: 5 ft 11 in (1.80 m)
- Listed weight: 195 lb (88 kg)

Career information
- High school: Wilmington (Wilmington, Ohio)
- College: Miami (OH) (2014)
- NFL draft: 2015: 2nd round, 62nd overall pick

Career history
- Green Bay Packers (2015–2017); Arizona Cardinals (2018); San Francisco 49ers (2019)*
- * Offseason or practice squad member only

Awards and highlights
- MAC Defensive Player of the Year (2014); First-team All-MAC (2014)

Career NFL statistics
- Total tackles: 91
- Sacks: 1
- Fumble recoveries: 2
- Pass deflections: 16
- Interceptions: 3
- Defensive touchdowns: 1
- Stats at Pro Football Reference

Quinten Benjamin Frederick Rollins (born July 15, 1992) is an American former professional football player who was a cornerback in the National Football League (NFL). He played one year of college football for the Miami RedHawks, after playing four years of basketball. He was selected by the Green Bay Packers in the second round of the 2015 NFL draft. He was also a member of the Arizona Cardinals and San Francisco 49ers.

== Early life ==
Quinten Rollins was raised by his mother and his grandmother along with two younger brothers. He attended Wilmington High School in Wilmington, Ohio, where he played both basketball and football for the Hurricanes. A four-year letter winner and two-year captain on the basketball team, and as a senior in 2009–10 he was named Division II first-team All-Ohio, averaging 19.5 points, 4.0 rebounds, 2.6 steals and 2.5 assists per game. As a junior in 2008–09. he was third-team All-Ohio, averaging 17.0 points, 5.0 rebounds, 4.0 assists and 2.0 steals.

In football, he was a three-year team captain. As a senior, Rollins was a first-team all-conference selection and Division II third-team All-Ohio. He is a member of the Wilmington High School Athletic Hall of Fame.

== College career ==
Rollins played college basketball at Miami University from 2010 to 2014. During his career at Miami he played in 116 games and finished second in RedHawks history with 214 career steals. He also ranked fourth at Miami in career assists (391), seventh in games started (106) and ninth in minutes played (3,448). He was a three-time Miami defensive player of the year.

Rollins joined Miami's football team in 2014. In his lone season of football, he was the Mid-American Conference Defensive Player of the Year after recording 72 tackles and seven interceptions.

=== College football statistics ===
Year	Team	Games		Tackles			Interceptions						Fumbles	
Year	Team	G	GS	Total	Solo	Ast	PDef	Int	Yds	Avg	Lng	TDs	FF	FR
2014	Miami	12	12	72	53	19	9	7	35	5.0	27	1	1	0
Total		12	12	72	53	19	9	7	35	5.0	27	1	1	0
Source: MiamiRedHawks.com

== Professional career ==
External videos
- Rollins's NFL Combine workout
- Rollins gets drafted by Green Bay

Pre-draft measurables
Height	Weight	Arm length	Hand span	Wingspan	40-yard dash	10-yard split	20-yard split	20-yard shuttle	Three-cone drill	Vertical jump	Broad jump	Bench press	Wonderlic
5 ft 11 1/8 in (1.81 m)	195 lb (88 kg)	30 1/4 in (0.77 m)	9 in (0.23 m)	6 ft 1 1/2 in (1.87 m)	4.57 s	1.61 s	2.67 s	4.28 s	7.10 s	36.5 in (0.93 m)	10 ft 2 in (3.10 m)	14 reps	19
All values are from NFL Combine

=== Green Bay Packers ===
==== 2015 ====
The Green Bay Packers selected Rollins in the second round (62nd overall) of the 2015 NFL draft. Rollins was the ninth cornerback selected in 2015 and was the highest selection from Miami University (Ohio) since Ben Roethlisberger in 2004. He also became the Redhawks' sixth highest selection and 45th player drafted in school history. On May 12, 2015, the Packers signed Rollins to a four-year, $3.74 million contract that also includes $1.25 million guaranteed and a signing bonus of $981,864.

He fell behind after missing the first three weeks of training camp with a hamstring injury. Upon returning from injury, he competed against first-round pick and fellow rookie Damarious Randall for the third cornerback spot on the Packers' depth chart. Head coach Mike McCarthy named him the fourth cornerback behind Sam Shields, Casey Hayward, and Randall to start the regular season.

He made his professional regular season debut in the Packers' season-opener at the Chicago Bears and made one solo tackle in their 31–23 victory. He was inactive the following week after the Packers' chose to play Demetri Goodson instead. On October 11, 2015, Rollins recorded two tackles, two pass deflections, and made his first career interception off St. Louis Rams' quarterback Nick Foles, and returned it for a 45-yard touchdown to put the Packers ahead 14–0 late in the first quarter. He recorded his second career interception with 28 seconds remaining in that game to secure the 24–10 victory for the Packers. On November 26, 2015, Rollins collected three combined tackles, one pass break up, and made his first career sack on Jay Cutler as the Packers were defeated by the Bears 17–13. The following week, Rollins earned his first career start in place of Randall who was inactive for Week 13 due to a knee injury. He recorded five combined tackles and broke up a pass in the 27–23 victory at the Detroit Lions. In Week 16, he recorded a season-high five solo tackles during a 38–8 loss at the Arizona Cardinals. Rollins finished his rookie season with 31 combined tackles (28 solo), six pass deflections, two interceptions, a sack, and a touchdown in 14 games and four starts.

The Green Bay Packers finished second in the NFC North with a 10–6 record and received a playoff berth. On January 10, 2016, Rollins played in his first playoff game and made one solo tackle and a pass breakup during the Packers' 35–18 victory at the Washington Redskins. They were eliminated from the playoffs after being defeated by the Cardinals 26–20 the following week.

==== 2016 ====
Rollins entered training camp competing against Randall and LaDarius Gunter for the vacant starting cornerback left by the departure of Hayward in free agency. He was named the third cornerback and the starting nickelback to start the 2016 regular season.

Rollins started the Packers' season-opener at the Jacksonville Jaguars and made two combined tackles and two pass deflections during a 27–23 victory. He suffered a groin injury and missed three games (Weeks 6–8). On December 11, 2016, he recorded seven combined tackles, two pass break ups, and intercepted a pass by Russell Wilson during a 38–10 win against the Seattle Seahawks. The following week, Rollins collected a career-high eight solo tackles in a 30–27 victory at the Bears. He finished the 2016 season with 41 combined tackles (39 solo), eight pass deflections, and an interceptions in 13 games and ten starts.

==== 2017 ====
Rollins entered camp competing with rookie Kevin King for the third cornerback spot on the Packers' depth chart. He was named the third cornerback behind Davon House and Randall.

He played in the Packers' season-opener against the Seahawks and made a season-high eight combined tackles and a pass deflection in their 17–9 victory. In Week 3, he saw a sharp decline in his snap count after he was surpassed by King on the depth chart and safety Morgan Burnett was given nickelback duties. On October 16, 2017, Rollins was placed on injured reserve after suffering a non-contact leg injury in Week 6. He finished the 2017 season with 19 combined tackles (nine solo) and two pass deflections in six games and one start. He received an overall grade of 41.3 from Pro Football Focus in 2017.

==== 2018 ====
The Packers attempted to convert Rollins to safety during the 2018 preseason, as well as giving him punt return duties, but he struggled in both roles. Rollins sustained a hamstring injury during the final preseason game against the Kansas City Chiefs on August 30; two days later, on September 1, the Packers placed Rollins on injured reserve. He was later released by the Packers with an injury settlement.

=== Arizona Cardinals ===
On November 27, 2018, Rollins signed with the Cardinals. He was released on December 18, 2018.

=== San Francisco 49ers ===
On August 16, 2019, Rollins was signed by the San Francisco 49ers. He was released during final roster cuts on August 30, 2019.

== NFL career statistics ==
Regular season statistics
Year	Team	GP	GS	Tackles					Interceptions						Fumbles	
Year	Team	GP	GS	Total	Solo	Ast	Sck	SFTY	PDef	Int	Yds	Avg	Lng	TDs	FF	FR
2015	GB	14	4	31	28	3	1.0	0	6	2	48	24.0	45	1	0	0
2016	GB	13	10	41	39	2	0.0	0	8	1	0	0.0	0	0	0	0
2017	GB	6	1	19	9	10	0.0	0	2	0	0	0	0	0	0	0
Total		33	15	91	76	15	1.0	0	16	3	48	16.0	45	1	0	0
Source: NFL.com

Postseason statistics
Year	Team	GP	GS	Tackles					Interceptions						Fumbles	
Year	Team	GP	GS	Total	Solo	Ast	Sck	SFTY	PDef	Int	Yds	Avg	Lng	TDs	FF	FR
2015	GB	2	1	1	1	0	0.0	0	1	0	0	0.0	0	0	0	0
2016	GB	1	0	4	4	0	0.0	0	0	0	0	0.0	0	0	0	0
Total		3	1	5	5	0	0.0	0	1	0	0	0.0	0	0	0	0
Source: pro-football-reference.com

== Personal life ==
Rollins has a daughter, Quinlyn, who was born in 2011. As of 2025 he is now a high school football coach, at Bridgeprep Academy Village Green Miami, FL.
