= B. J. McBryde =

American gridiron football player (born 1991)

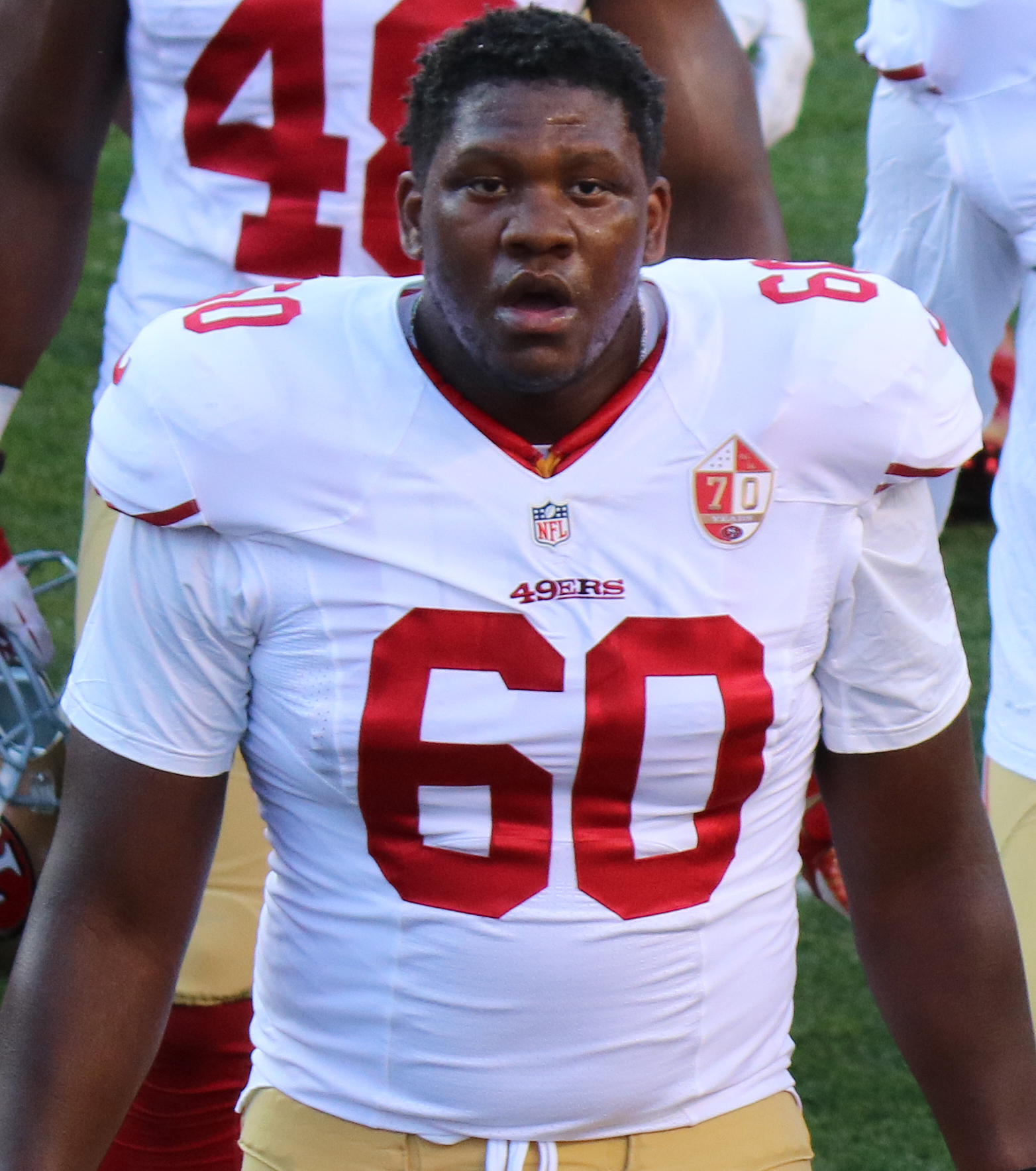
- McBryde with the San Francisco 49ers in 2016

No. 75
- Position: Defensive end

Personal information
- Born: October 21, 1991 (age 35); Beaver Falls, Pennsylvania, U.S.
- Listed height: 6 ft 5 in (1.96 m)
- Listed weight: 292 lb (132 kg)

Career information
- High school: Beaver Falls (PA)
- College: Connecticut
- NFL draft: 2015: undrafted

Career history
- Philadelphia Eagles (2015)*; Green Bay Packers (2015–2016)*; San Francisco 49ers (2016)*; Massachusetts Pirates (2018); YCF Grit (2019); Saskatchewan Roughriders (2019)*
- * Offseason or practice squad member only

Ronald Brendan John "B. J." McBryde III (born October 21, 1991) is an American former football defensive end who played college football at the University of Connecticut. He was signed by the Philadelphia Eagles as an undrafted free agent in 2015 and later spent time with the Green Bay Packers and San Francisco 49ers.

== Professional career ==
Pre-draft measurables
Height	Weight	40-yard dash	10-yard split	20-yard split	20-yard shuttle	Three-cone drill	Vertical jump	Broad jump	Bench press
6 ft 5 in (1.96 m)	292 lb (132 kg)	5.05 s	1.73 s	2.79 s	4.25 s	7.22 s	31.5 in (0.80 m)	10 ft 3 in (3.12 m)	24 reps
All values are from Pro Day

=== Philadelphia Eagles ===
After going undrafted in the 2015 NFL draft, McBryde signed with the Philadelphia Eagles on May 2, 2015. On August 14, 2015, he was waived by the Eagles with a foot injury. After going unclaimed through waivers, McBryde was added to the Eagles injured reserve list on August 17, 2016. On October 21, 2015, he was waived from injured reserve.

=== Green Bay Packers ===
On November 18, 2015, McBryde was signed to the Green Bay Packers' practice squad. The Packers placed him on the practice squad injured list on January 5, 2016. On January 19, 2016, McBryde was re-signed by the Packers after the season ended. He was released by the Packers on July 25, 2016.

=== San Francisco 49ers ===
McBryde was signed by the San Francisco 49ers on July 29, 2016. On September 3, 2016, he was released by the 49ers during final team cuts.
