= Dainon Sidney =

American football player (born 1975)

No. 37
- Position: Cornerback

Personal information
- Born: May 30, 1975 (age 51); Atlanta, Georgia, U.S.
- Listed height: 6 ft 0 in (1.83 m)
- Listed weight: 197 lb (89 kg)

Career information
- High school: Riverdale (Riverdale, Georgia)
- College: University of Alabama at Birmingham; East Tennessee State
- NFL draft: 1998: 3rd round, 77th overall pick

Career history
- Tennessee Oilers / Titans (1998–2002); Buffalo Bills (2003); Detroit Lions (2004)

Career NFL statistics
- Tackles: 97
- Interceptions: 6
- Forced fumbles: 2
- Stats at Pro Football Reference

Dainon Sidney (born May 30, 1975) is an American former professional football player who was a cornerback in the National Football League (NFL) for seven seasons.

He was selected 77th overall in the third round of the 1998 NFL draft, where he played for the Tennessee Oilers / Titans from 1998 to 2002. During his tenure, Sidney contributed to the team's journey to the Super Bowl XXXIV. Sidney later went on to play for the Buffalo Bills and the Detroit Lions and retired in 2004. In 2008, he took on the role of a temporary defensive backs coach for the football team at Austin Peay State University, working under head coach Rick Christophel.

In addition to his football career, Sidney pursued his academic aspirations. He earned his master's degree from Trevecca University, and he is currently a member of the staff at Meigs Magnet Middle School in Nashville.
