= Jamel Johnson =

American gridiron football player (born 1991)

Profile
- Position: Wide receiver

Personal information
- Born: July 9, 1991 (age 35); Salinas, California, U.S.
- Listed height: 6 ft 2 in (1.88 m)
- Listed weight: 225 lb (102 kg)

Career information
- High school: Montgomery (AL) Carver
- College: Alabama State
- NFL draft: 2014: undrafted

Career history
- Green Bay Packers (2015–2016)*; Seattle Seahawks (2017)*; Toronto Argonauts (2017); Seattle Seahawks (2017)*; Columbus Lions (2018)
- * Offseason or practice squad member only
- Stats at Pro Football Reference

Jamel Ojedita Johnson (born July 9, 1991) is an American former professional football wide receiver. He played college football at Alabama State, and was signed by the Green Bay Packers as an undrafted free agent in 2015.

== Professional career ==
Pre-draft measurables
Height	Weight	Arm length	Hand span	Wingspan	40-yard dash	10-yard split	20-yard split	20-yard shuttle	Three-cone drill	Vertical jump	Broad jump	Bench press
6 ft 2 1/4 in (1.89 m)	227 lb (103 kg)	32 1/4 in (0.82 m)	9 1/8 in (0.23 m)	6 ft 6 1/4 in (1.99 m)	4.58 s	1.59 s	2.63 s	4.34 s	6.78 s	38.0 in (0.97 m)	10 ft 3 in (3.12 m)	18 reps
All values are from Pro Day

=== Green Bay Packers ===
Johnson was signed to the Green Bay Packers' practice squad on December 8, 2015, after going undrafted in the 2014 NFL draft and unsigned for the entire 2014 NFL season. On January 18, 2016, he was re-signed by the Packers after finishing the season on the practice squad. Johnson was released by the Packers on August 29, 2016.

=== Seattle Seahawks (first stint) ===
On January 19, 2017, Johnson signed a reserve/future contract with the Seattle Seahawks. On May 9, 2017, he was released by the Seahawks.

=== Toronto Argonauts ===
On June 10, 2017, Johnson signed with the Toronto Argonauts of the Canadian Football League.

=== Seattle Seahawks (second stint) ===
On August 3, 2017, Johnson signed with the Seahawks. He was waived on August 16, 2017.

=== Columbus Lions ===
Veal signed with the Columbus Lions of the National Arena League in December 2017. He was released on April 19, 2018.
