= Kennard Backman =

American football player (born 1993)

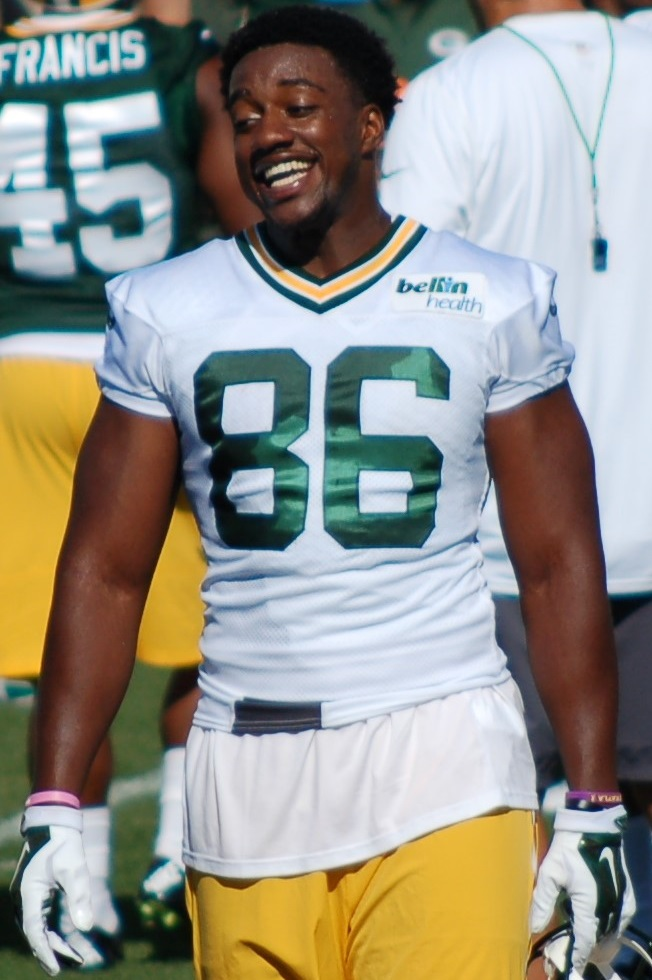
- Backman with the Packers in 2015

No. 86
- Position: Tight end

Personal information
- Born: February 26, 1993 (age 33); Atlanta, Georgia, U.S.
- Listed height: 6 ft 3 in (1.91 m)
- Listed weight: 258 lb (117 kg)

Career information
- High school: Mableton (GA) Whitefield
- College: UAB
- NFL draft: 2015: 6th round, 213th overall pick

Career history
- Green Bay Packers (2015); New England Patriots (2016)*; Detroit Lions (2016–2017)*
- * Offseason or practice squad member only

Awards and highlights
- Second-team All-C-USA (2014)
- Stats at Pro Football Reference

Kennard Chike Backman (born February 26, 1993) is an American former professional football player who was a tight end in the National Football League (NFL). He played college football at UAB and was selected by the Green Bay Packers in the sixth round of the 2015 NFL draft.

== Professional career ==
External videos
- Backman gets drafted by Green Bay

Pre-draft measurables
Height	Weight	40-yard dash	10-yard split	20-yard split	20-yard shuttle	Three-cone drill	Vertical jump	Broad jump	Bench press	Wonderlic
6 ft 3 in (1.91 m)	243 lb (110 kg)	4.66 s	1.65 s	2.74 s	4.49 s	7.23 s	35.5 in (0.90 m)	9 ft 9 in (2.97 m)	17 reps	22
All values are from Pro Day

=== Green Bay Packers ===
Backman was selected in the sixth round (213th overall) by the Green Bay Packers in the 2015 NFL draft. On May 8, 2015, he signed a contract with the Packers. In his rookie season, Backman appeared in seven games, playing predominantly on special teams. He saw his first playoff action in the Packers' divisional playoff game against the Arizona Cardinals, registering a tackle on special teams. On August 30, 2016, Backman was placed on injured reserve.

=== New England Patriots ===
On November 12, 2016, Backman was signed to the practice squad of the New England Patriots. He was released three days later. He was re-signed to the practice squad on November 29, 2016, but was released again three days later.

=== Detroit Lions ===
On December 31, 2016, Backman was signed to the Detroit Lions' practice squad. He signed a reserve/future contract with the Lions on January 9, 2017. He was waived by the Lions on May 11, 2017.

=== Statistics ===
Year	Team	G	GS	Receiving					Rushing					Fumbles	
Year	Team	G	GS	Rec	Yds	Avg	Lng	TD	Att	Yds	Avg	Lng	TD	FUM	Lost
Regular season
2015	GB	7	0	0	0	0.0	0	0	0	0	0.0	0	0	0	0
Total		7	0	0	0	0.0	0	0	0	0	0.0	0	0	0	0
Postseason
2015	GB	1	0	0	0	0.0	0	0	0	0	0.0	0	0	0	0
Total		1	0	0	0	0.0	0	0	0	0	0.0	0	0	0	0
