= Forensic dentistry =

Aspect of criminal investigation

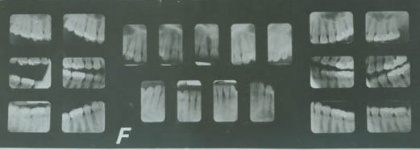
Dental X-Ray of formerly unidentified murder victim Pamela Buckley, found in 1976

Forensic dentistry or forensic odontology involves the handling, examination, and evaluation of dental evidence in a criminal justice context. Forensic dentistry is used in both criminal and civil law. Forensic dentists assist investigative agencies in identifying human remains, particularly in cases when identifying information is otherwise scarce or nonexistent—for instance, identifying burn victims by consulting the victim's dental records. Forensic dentists may also be asked to assist in determining the age, race, sex, and previous dental history of unidentified human beings. The primary benefit of dental evidence is its perpetual preservation following death. The examination of antemortem and postmortem dental characteristics is made possible by each persons distinctive tooth patterns.

Forensic dentists may make their determinations by using radiographs, ante- and post-mortem photographs, and DNA analysis. Another type of evidence that may be analyzed is bite marks, whether left on the victim (by the attacker), the perpetrator (from the victim of an attack), or on an object found at the crime scene. However, this latter application of forensic dentistry has proven highly controversial, as no scientific studies or evidence substantiate that bite marks can demonstrate sufficient detail for positive identification and numerous instances where experts diverge widely in their evaluations of the same bite mark evidence.

Bite mark analysis has been condemned by several scientific bodies, such as the National Institute of Standards and Technology (NIST), National Academy of Sciences (NAS), the President's Council of Advisors on Science and Technology (PCAST), and the Texas Forensic Science Commission.

It is important to acknowledge that this discipline as well as any other forensic discipline is very susceptible to bias.

Questions raised by the National Academy of Sciences in its 2009 report on forensic science led several courts to restrict bite-mark testimony.

== Training ==
=== India ===
In India, certificate courses offered include a modular course by D. Y. Patil Vidyapeeth, Pune, and some other private entities. The Indian Dental Association offers a fellowship program in FO which can be either a classroom program or an online program. Master's degree programs in different forensic disciplines along with M.Sc. Forensic Odontology is offered by National Forensic Sciences University which is the world's only university dedicated to forensic sciences. It is a 2‑year full‑time course offered at the university's campus at Gandhinagar.

Indo-Pacific Academy of Forensic Odontology: The INPAFO Fellowship/Scholarship is a program offered by the Indo-Pacific Academy of Forensic Odontology (INPAFO) to support academic and professional development in forensic odontology. There are different types of fellowships, including the INPAFO Fellowship and the INPAFO Post Graduate Research Scholarship (IPGRS), which provide opportunities for research and skill enhancement. Additionally, INPAFO offers an Honorary Fellowship to recognize individuals with outstanding contributions and leadership in the field.more about INPAFO Fellowships-scholarships

=== Australia ===
Postgraduate diploma programs for dentists are available at The University of Melbourne, The University of Western Australia, and The University of Adelaide.

=== Belgium ===
The Belgian university KU Leuven offers a master's in Forensic Odontology.

=== United Kingdom ===
Following the closure of the MSc course at the University of Glamorgan, one can receive either an MSc in Forensic Dentistry (a one-year programme) or a Masters in Forensic Odontology (a two-year programme) from the University of Dundee in Scotland, which currently has a very limited intake.

=== United States ===
There are two odontology training programs available in the US. One is a Fellowship program at The University of Texas Health Science at San Antonio Center Dental School, and the other is a master's degree program through the University of Tennessee Institute of Agriculture College of Veterinary Medicine.

=== Canada ===
For undergraduate studies, dental school candidates in Canada are required to complete a BA or at least three years of study in a BA program before completing a dental degree. BA Programs often involve science or biomedical but can include much more, as long as students have completed the basic prerequisites needed.

There are no graduate study programs for forensic odontology specifically in Canada. Some universities have offered some involvement in forensic science disciples during clinical dental specialty projects, however, they will not graduate with credibility in the forensic odontology discipline.

Dental degrees given by universities in Canada include DDS (doctor of dental science) and DMD (doctor of dental medicine).

There is no professional certification process for forensic odontologists in Canada currently. It is possible for Canadians to certify for the ABFO, a section of the American Academy of Forensic Science. This process also includes an examination as well as the candidates must complete a career checklist of accomplishments which will be reviewed. This checklist may include fellowships, working with recognized medicolegal death investigation agencies, completing a minimum level of casework and research, and providing testimony in court cases. The ABFO and the AAFS often hold scientific sessions which offer workshops including identification, civil litigation, age determination, and bite-mark analysis. These are beneficial in helping prospective forensic practitioners move towards board-eligible status.

In Ontario, there is a group of 10 forensic dentists that are known as the Province of Ontario Dental Identification Team or better known as PODIT.

== High-profile criminal cases ==
Forensic odontology has played a key role in famous criminal cases:

In 1692, during the Salem Witch Trials, Rev. George Burroughs was accused of witchcraft and conspiring with the Devil, with biting his victims supposedly being evidence of his crimes. His bite marks and the bite marks of other people were compared to the victim's marks. The judges readily accepted the bite marks as evidence and this was the first time in what would become the United States that bite marks were used as evidence to solve a crime. He was later convicted and hanged. About two decades later, he was exonerated by the State, and his children were compensated for the wrongful execution.

One of the first published accounts involving a conviction based on bite marks as evidence was the “Gorringe case”, in 1948, in which pathologist Keith Simpson used bite marks on the breast of the victim to seal a murder conviction against Robert Gorringe for the murder of his wife Phyllis. Another early case was Doyle v. State, which occurred in Texas in 1954. The bite mark, in this case, was on a piece of cheese found at the crime scene of a burglary. The defendant was later asked to bite another piece of cheese for comparison. A firearms examiner and a dentist evaluated the bite marks independently and both concluded that the marks were made by the same set of teeth. The conviction, in this case, set the stage for bite marks found on objects and skin to be used as evidence in future cases.

- Fredrik Fasting Torgersen
- Wayne Boden – an early case of Forensic Dentistry
- State of Florida v. Ted Bundy
- State of New Jersey v. Jesse Timmendequas (Megan's Law case)
- People of California v. Marx, the 1975 case which established evidentiary standards for forensic odontology
- People of Arizona v. Ray Krone, bite mark evidence led to a wrongful conviction.

== Organizations ==
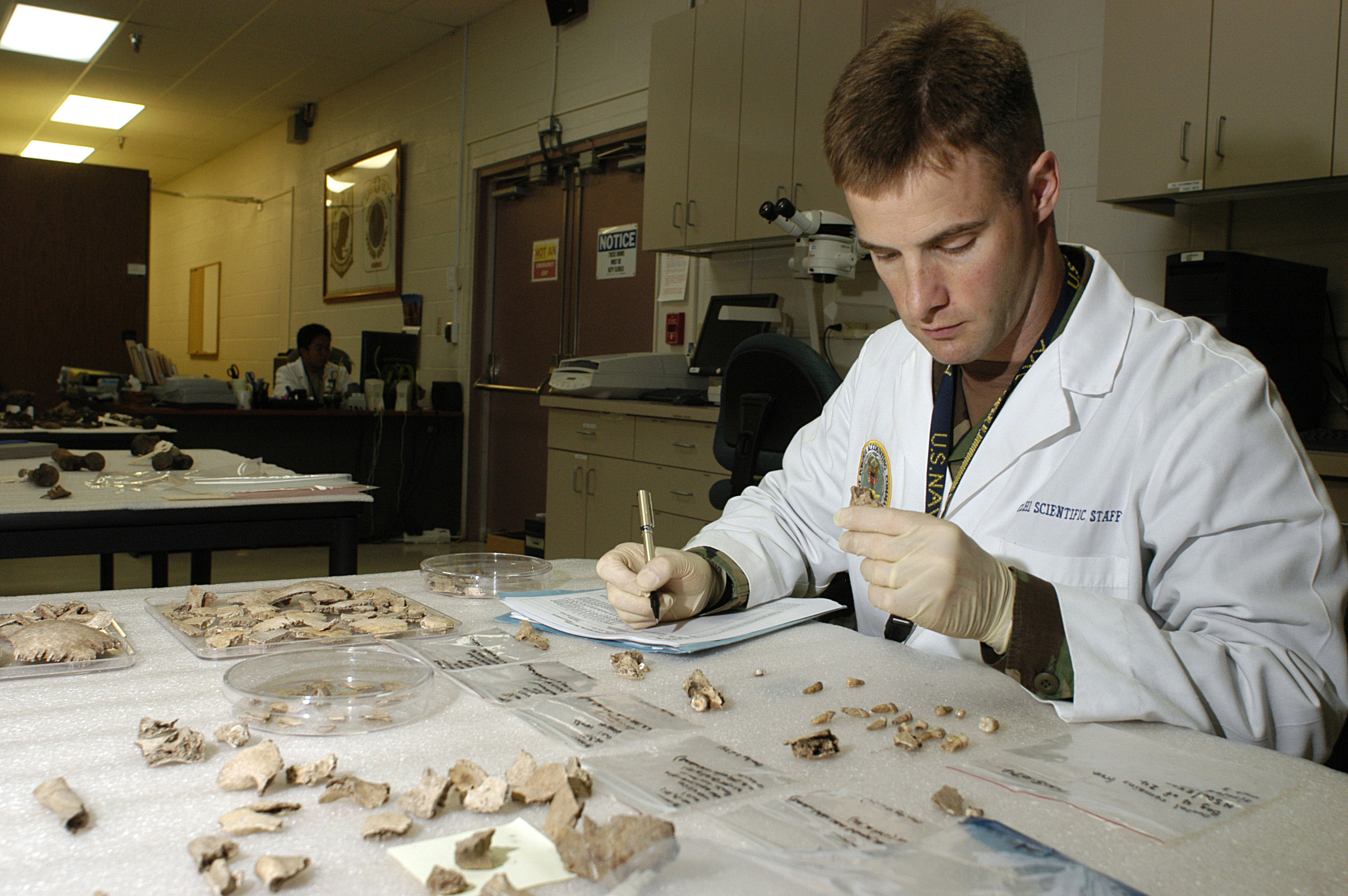
Forensic dentist examining specimens

Several organizations are dedicated to the field of forensic odontology. These organizations include the Bureau of Legal Dentistry (BOLD), the American Board of Forensic Odontology (ABFO), American Society of Forensic Odontology (ASFO), the International Organization for Forensic Odonto-Stomatology (IOFOS) and the Association Forensic Odontology For Human Rights (AFOHR), and the Indo-Pacific Academy of Forensic Odontology (INPAFO). Countries have their own forensic Odontological societies, including the British Association for Forensic Odontology (BAFO) and the Australian Society of Forensic Odontology (AuSFO). Associations offering humanitarian and pro bono services include AFOHR and Dental Team DVI Italia.

In Canada, The Royal College of Dentists has not recognized forensic odontology therefore there is no organization for Canada, however, there are three small groups for forensic dentistry: BC Forensic Odontology Response Team (BC_FORT), Province of Ontario Dental Identification Team (PODIT), and a team in Quebec run out of McGill University.

The Bureau of Legal Dentistry encourages the use of multiple dental impressions to create a “dental lineup”, similar to a suspect lineup used to identify alleged perpetrators of crime. Currently, dental impressions collected as evidence are compared only to those collected from a given suspect, which may bias the resulting outcome. Using multiple dental impressions in a lineup may enable forensic odontologists to significantly decrease the current bias in matching bite marks to the teeth of a suspect. The organization BOLD also supports the creation of a database of dental records, which could help in verifying dental uniqueness. This database could be created using criminal records or possibly all dental patients.

In 1984, the ABFO attempted to diminish the discrepancies and increase the validity of bite mark analysis by creating bite mark methodology guidelines. The guidelines attempt to establish standard terminology in describing bite marks and that reduces the risk of biased results. The ABFO also provides advice on how to effectively collect and preserve evidence. For example, they recommend that the collection of DNA evidence and detailed photographs of bites be taken together at the crime scene. The guidelines also outline how and what a forensic odontologist should record, such as the location, contours, shape, and size of a bite mark. They also provide a system of scoring to assess the degree to which a suspect's dental profile and bite mark match. According to the ABFO, the guidelines are not a mandate of methods to be used, but a list of generally accepted methods.

The guidelines are intended to prevent potentially useful evidence from being thrown out simply because the forensic odontologist's collection methods were not standardized. Kouble and Craig used a simplified version of the ABFO scoring guidelines in order to retain accuracy with a larger sample of comparisons. A numerical score was assigned to represent the degree of similarity between the bite mark and model/overlay. The higher the score, the greater the similarity. In order to simplify the model, some features that were individually scored in the ABFO guidelines such as arch size and shape were assessed together while certain distinctive features such as spacing between teeth were treated as a separate variable. The authors believe that a simplified version would increase the strength of the comparison process. In an attempt to improve guidelines used to collect dental evidence, IOFOS developed one of the most recognized systems for the collection of forensic dental evidence

== Bite mark analysis ==
A bite mark is defined as a change in a surface's appearance due to the teeth coming into contact with it, leaving behind a dental pattern of the bite. Studies have been performed in an attempt to find the simplest, most efficient, and most reliable way of analyzing bite marks and comparing them with one another and with suspects' teeth. There are two important notions when it comes to bite mark analysis: every individual has unique dentition that can be identifiable and this uniqueness can be found in a bite mark left in human skin. The theory behind bite mark analysis has been called into doubt in recent years, with many observers considering the entire field unscientific and invalid and calling for bite mark evidence to be inadmissible in court.

=== Proposed theoretical basis ===
Bites can occur on both the victim and the suspect; teeth are used as a weapon by the aggressor and in self-defense by the victim. Although they are only a small portion of most forensic dentists' caseload, bite marks represent the most challenging aspect of the discipline. In addition to the location of the bite mark, the type of severity of the injury may give investigators clues as to the mental state of the offender. Bite marks may be found on the flesh of victims of a violent attack, particularly on the stomach or buttocks. Bite mark evidence may be the only form of physical evidence found on a body. Alternatively, they may be found on the suspect, left by the victim during self-defense. Bite marks can be altered through stretching, movement, or change in environment after the bite. Skin is not ideal for holding the shape of a bite mark as it can become distorted due to the viscoelasticity of the skin. There is also no set standard by which to analyze and compare bite marks.

Factors that may affect the accuracy of bite mark identification include time-dependent changes of the bite mark on living bodies, effects of where the bite mark was found, damage on soft tissue, and similarities in dentition among individuals. Other factors include poor photography, impressions, or measurement of dentition characteristics.

Most bite mark analysis studies use porcine skin (pigskin), because it is comparable to the skin of a human, and it is considered unethical to bite a human for study in the United States. Limitations to the bite mark studies include differences in properties of pigskin compared to human skin and the technique of using simulated pressures to create bite marks. Although similar histologically, pigskin and human skin behave in dynamically different ways due to differences in elasticity. Furthermore, postmortem bites on nonhuman skin, such as those used in the experiments of Martin-de-las Heras et al., display different patterns to those seen in antemortem bite injuries. In recognition of the limitations of their study, Kouble and Craig suggest using a G-clamp on an articulator in future studies to standardize the amount of pressure used to produce experimental bite marks instead of applying manual pressure to models on pigskin. Future research and technological developments may help reduce the occurrence of such limitations.

Kouble and Craig compared direct methods and indirect methods of bite mark analysis. In the past, the direct method compared a model of the suspect's teeth to a life-size photograph of the actual bite mark. In these experiments, direct comparisons were made between dental models and either photographs or "fingerprint powder lift models." The "fingerprint powder lift" technique involves dusting the bitten skin with black fingerprint powder and using fingerprint tape to transfer the bite marks onto a sheet of acetate. Indirect methods involve the use of transparent overlays to record a suspect's biting edges. Transparent overlays are made by free-hand tracing the occlusal surfaces of a dental model onto an acetate sheet. When comparing the “fingerprint powder lift” technique against the photographs, the use of photographs resulted in higher scores determined by a modified version of the ABFO scoring guidelines. The use of transparent overlays is considered subjective and irreproducible because the tracing can be easily manipulated. On the other hand, photocopier-generated overlays where no tracing is used are considered to be the best method in matching the correct bite mark to the correct set of models without the use of computer imaging.

While the photocopier-generated technique is sensitive, reliable, and inexpensive, new methods involving digital overlays have proven to be more accurate. Two recent technological developments include the 2D polyline method and the painting method. Both methods use Adobe Photoshop. The use of the 2D polyline method entails drawing straight lines between two fixed points in the arch and between incisal edges to indicate the tooth width. The use of the painting method entails coating the incisal edges of a dental model with red glossy paint and then photographing the model. Adobe Photoshop is then used to make measurements on the image. A total of 13 variables were used in the analysis. Identification for both methods was based on canine-to-canine distance (one variable), incisor width (four variables), and rotational angles of the incisors (eight variables). The 2D polyline method relies heavily on accurate measurements, while the painting method depends on the precise overlaying of the images. Although both methods were reliable, the 2D polyline method gave efficient and more objective results.

=== Criticism of bite mark analysis ===
Bite mark analysis has been criticized by the President's Council of Advisors on Science and Technology (PCAST). The PCAST has identified that bite mark analysis is an area which lacks clear standards in regards to the features needed to identify a particular set of dentition as having created a particular mark. The analysis of bite marks is subjective and is highly criticized.

So called bite mark analysis has been criticized as largely unscientific based on three pillars of critique:

- "Human anterior dental patterns have not been shown to be unique at the individual level"
- "Those patterns are not accurately transferred to human skin consistently"
- "It has not been shown that defining characteristics of those patterns can be accurately analyzed to exclude or not exclude individuals as the source of a bitemark"

Recently, the scientific foundation of forensic odontology, and especially bite mark comparison, has been called into question. A 1999 study by a member of the American Board of Forensic Odontology found a 63% rate of false identifications. However, the study was based on an informal workshop during an ABFO meeting which many members did not consider a valid scientific setting. In February 2016, the Texas Forensic Science Commission recommended that bite mark evidence not be used in criminal prosecutions until it had a more firm scientific basis. That same year, the President's Council of Advisors on Science and Technology declared that bite mark analysis had no scientific validity.

An investigative series by the Chicago Tribune entitled "Forensics under the Microscope" examined many forensic science disciplines to see if they truly deserve the air of infallibility that has come to surround them. The investigators concluded that bite mark comparison is always subjective and no standards for comparison have been accepted across the field. The journalists discovered that no rigorous experimentation has been conducted to determine error rates for bite mark comparison, a key part of the scientific method.

Critics of bite mark comparison cite the case of Ray Krone, an Arizona man convicted of murder on bite mark evidence left on a woman's breast. DNA evidence later implicated another man and Krone was released from prison. Similarly, Roy Brown was convicted of murder due in part to bite-mark evidence, and freed after DNA testing of the saliva left in the bite wounds matched someone else.

Although bite mark analysis has been used in legal proceedings since 1870, it remains a controversial topic due to a variety of factors. DeVore and Barbenel and Evans have shown that the accuracy of a bite mark on the skin is limited at best. Skin is not a good medium for dental impressions; it is liable to several of irregularities present before the imprint that could cause distortion. Also, bite marks can be altered through stretching, movement, or a changing environment during and after the actual bite. Furthermore, the level of distortion tends to increase after the bite mark was made. Both studies suggest that for the bite mark to be accurately analyzed, the body must be examined in the same position it was in when the bite occurred, which can be a difficult if the not impossible task to accomplish. Bite mark distortion can rarely be quantified. Therefore, bite marks found at the scene are often analyzed under the assumption that they have undergone minimal distortion.

== Dental Age Estimation ==
When trustworthy birth records are either unavailable or contested, Dental Age Estimation (DAE) is a scientific method for estimating an individual's age. It is frequently used in criminal investigations, immigration and asylum proceedings, and disaster victim identification, among other forensic, medico-legal, and humanitarian contexts. Because of their consistent development and resilience to environmental and postmortem alterations, teeth are regarded as extremely dependable markers. In addition to skeletal and chronological age, dental age is evaluated using a variety of techniques based on the age group and available data.

In 2026 the volume Dental Age Assessment: A Global Perspective was published by Springer Publishers, comprising 20 chapters reviewing established and emerging techniques and reflecting current international practices and future directions in the field.

Recent research has investigated the application of artificial intelligence to chronological age estimation from radiographic data. Machine learning algorithms can automatically assess patterns in the development and degradation of teeth, providing objective estimates of the legal age. These approaches aim to improve accuracy, consistency, and scalability.

== Sex estimation ==
The determination of sex is important in the identification of unknown individuals in both forensic and archaeological contexts. The preferred anatomical methods for sex determination are based on pelvic and cranio-facial morphology. Using these parts of the skeleton, males and females can be correctly classified with over 90% accuracy. However, these skeletal elements are sometimes recovered in a fragmentary state, rendering sex estimation difficult. Moreover, there is currently no reliable method of sex determination of juvenile or sub-adult remains from cranial or post-cranial skeletal elements since dimorphic traits only become apparent after puberty, and this represents a fundamental problem in forensic investigations. In such situations, teeth are potentially useful in sex determination. Due to their hardness, they are highly resistant to taphonomic processes and are much more likely to be recovered than other parts of the fact, the enamel present on teeth is the hardest biological substance in the human body; therefore making them extremely sustainable analytical evidence in a forensic context. Moreover, teeth may be particularly useful for sexing immature skeletal remains since both primary and permanent sets of teeth develop before puberty.

For several decades research has been conducted into human dental sexual dimorphism, looking at different tooth classes, and using various techniques and measurements, to try to establish the extent of any dimorphism and find criteria or patterns that might enable accurate sexing of unknown individuals. Most of these studies have focused on sexual dimorphism in crown-size dimensions. This research has established that human teeth are sexually dimorphic and, although males and females exhibit overlapping dimensions, there are significant differences in mean values. Sexual dimorphism has been observed in both deciduous and permanent dentition, although it is much less in deciduous teeth. On average, male teeth are slightly larger than female teeth, with the greatest difference observed in the canine teeth. Research using microtomographic scans to look at internal dental tissues has also shown that male teeth consist of significantly greater quantities of dentine than female teeth. This results in female teeth having thicker enamel, on average. Researchers have attempted to use statistical techniques such as discriminant functions or logistic regression equations based on these sex differences to estimate the usefulness of such formulae is uncertain because sexual dimorphism in teeth may vary between populations. The advanced methods which amplify the DNA by using Polymerase chain reaction (PCR) give 100% success in sex determination. Sex estimation based on dentition remains experimental and has yet to gain widespread acceptance. Nevertheless, it offers potentially useful additional techniques that could be used alongside more established methods.

== Identification methods ==
=== Radiograph comparison ===
The comparison of antemortem and post-mortem radiographic records can be done to attain a positive identification of an individual. Teeth are used since they are very durable and resistant to extreme conditions. The radiographs can present dental restorations as well as unique morphology for each individual. Dental patterns are unique due to the variety of treatments as well as growth for each individual, which creates a benefit in using them for human identification

Post-mortem radiographs can be taken at the scene or in a laboratory, the antemortem records are collected from dentists’ existing files and are used for comparison with the radiographs taken from the deceased unknown individual.

It is important that dentists keep all radiographs stored properly since the original dental records will be used during this comparison.

The antemortem and post-mortem radiographs will both be analyzed and transcribed onto Victim Identification forms and loaded into a computer database in order to compare many different antemortem records to the post-mortem in order to obtain a match.

Radiograph comparison is often a method used in mass fatalities for example natural disasters but It can be used in any case.

=== DNA extraction ===
Teeth contain a great source of DNA since they are very chemically and physically resistant to extreme conditions. This method is especially useful in cases where other DNA sources are not accessible, for example in burned victims. Teeth can be used to create a DNA profile in order to identify unknown deceased individuals. Dentin and enamel provide a resistant and protective surface that houses the dental pulp which is located under the enamel and dentin layers in the center of the tooth, which contains the nerves and blood supply as well. Within the pulp is where genomic and mitochondrial DNA can be extracted. The teeth should not be completely destroyed using DNA analysis alone, it should be compared with other techniques as well before damaging techniques are used.

=== Smile photographs comparison ===
In cases where the body is in an advanced stage of decomposition, such as in cases of skeletal remains and charring, and considering the difficulties or impossibility of using fingerprint analysis and the high cost of DNA testing, forensic dentistry can play an important role in identification.

The most common means used for ante-mortem comparison are X-rays, dental models, and dental records. However, there are cases where the presumed victim never visited a dentist or the family cannot obtain the aforementioned sources, complicating the odontolegal identification of the victim. Another source of comparison can be photographs of the presumed victim's smile (ante-mortem) compared to photographs of the deceased person's smile (post-mortem), which can highlight the dental characteristics present and, if consistent, confirm the victim's identification.

Two main techniques are generally employed (both of which require the forensic dentist to take photographs of the deceased person's smile, which can then be compared to the ante-mortem photographs):

- Direct comparison of the characteristics presents in the ante-mortem photograph with the observed characteristics in the deceased person. In this technique, the ante-mortem and post-mortem photographs must be paired, and the dental characteristics found should be compared, described, and noted.
- Computerized outlining of the incisal edges of the teeth in the ante-mortem and post-mortem photographs. In this technique, the expert analyzes the morphology of the smile line, delineating the incisal edges and comparing them.

To achieve this, attention must be given to important details, such as:

- Both the ante-mortem and post-mortem photographs need to be as clear as possible, with good/excellent quality.
- The post-mortem photograph should be taken at the same angle of incidence as the ante-mortem photograph.
- The more visible teeth in the ante-mortem photograph, the better. Therefore, selecting the best photograph obtained is important.
- The use of software to annotate the characteristics present in the ante-mortem and post-mortem photographs, facilitating the visualization of comparative elements for everyone, including laypeople.

Each person's smile is unique, just like fingerprints, palatal rugae, and DNA. Therefore, when properly applied with the necessary scientific rigor, identification through photographs of the smile becomes a reliable method to establish an identification.

=== Palatal rugoscopy comparison ===
This method of identification involves the analysis and comparison of palatal rugae from the deceased with the palatal rugae of the potential victim. One way to perform this comparison is by creating a mold of the upper arch of the deceased (capturing the palatal rugae) or using a complete upper denture that belonged to the deceased, or on a plaster model for dental purposes, and in an object containing the palatal rugae of the missing person during their lifetime (such as an old complete upper denture in possession of the family). Once the two plaster models are created, they should be scanned/photographed, and a computerized delineation of the palatal rugae should be performed, analyzing each individual ruga and comparing their location, shape, and pattern in each of the photos (of the models).

If there is a match, the victim can be identified. The use of dentures for this identification can be done if the palatal rugae are clearly visible. The impression of palatal rugae in dental prostheses is formed over several years of use by the individual. This method has a significant impact on the identification process, particularly when other methodologies and identification techniques cannot be implemented.

Based on quantity, length and shape, Thomas et al. categorized palatal rugae patterns. Based on length, there is primary rugae (5-10mm), secondary rugae (3-5mm) and fragmentary rugae (less than 3mm). Based on shape, there is straight (travels straight from the start to finish), curvy (a straightforward crescent with a slight curvature), circular (a distinct, continuous ring shape), and lastly wavy (serpentine like).

== See also ==
- American Society of Forensic Odontology
- Hair analysis
- Innocence Project
- Comparative dental analysis
- Dental analysis in archaeology
