= Dover Area School District =

School district in Pennsylvania

Coordinates: 40.00015°N 76.85073°W

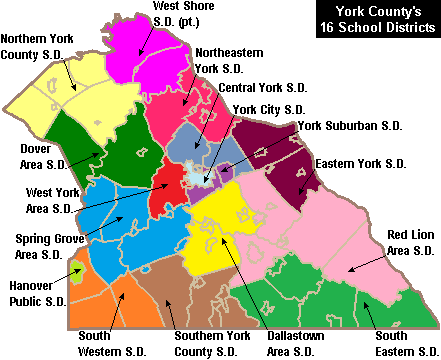

Address
- 101 Edgeway Road Dover, York County, Pennsylvania, 17315; United States

District information
- Type: Public

Students and staff
- District mascot: Eagles
- Colors: Red, Silver/White and Black

Other information
- Website: www.doversd.org

The Dover Area School District is a midsized, rural, public school district located in York County, Pennsylvania. It serves Dover Township and the Borough of Dover. According to the 2010 United States Census, the district community's population grew to 25,779 people. The population of the district was 22,349 people, according to the 2000 federal census. The educational attainment levels for the Dover Area School District population (25 years old and over) were 87% high school graduates and 14.7% college graduates.

According to the Pennsylvania Budget and Policy Center, 34.3% of the Dover Area School District's pupils lived at 185% or below the Federal Poverty level as shown by their eligibility for the federal free or reduced price school meal programs in 2012. In 2009, the district residents’ per capita income was $20,403, while the median family income was $53,056. In the Commonwealth, the median family income was $49,501 and the United States median family income was $49,445, in 2010. In York County, the median household income was $57,494. By 2013, the median household income in the United States rose to $52,100.

Dover Area School District operates seven schools: Dover Area High School (9th-12th), Dover Area Intermediate School (7th-8th), Dover Area Elementary School, Leib Elementary School, North Salem Elementary School and Weigelstown Elementary School. High school students may choose to attend York County School of Technology for training in the construction and mechanical trades. The Lincoln Intermediate Unit IU12 provides the district with a wide variety of services like specialized education for disabled students and hearing, speech and visual disability services and professional development for staff and faculty.

In 2012, the Washington Township Educational Coalition filed a petition with the Court of Common Pleas of York County, Pennsylvania, to initiate the process of transferring Washington Township from the Dover Area School District to the Northern York County School District. The petitioners cited the superior education outcomes and lower property taxes in Northern County School District as motives for the change request. Estimates project a net gain of $800,000 to $1 million over the next five years to Northern York County School District if the change were approved. After initially denying the petition in March 2017, the State Board of Education issued an order on March 10, 2021, transferring Washington Township to the Northern York County School District effective with the 2021-2022 school year.

== Extracurriculars ==
The Dover Area School District's students have access to a wide variety of clubs, activities and an extensive sports program.

=== Instrumental Music Department ===
Dover Area School District is well known for its music programs. The Dover Eagle Marching Band, led by director George J. Bradshaw, went on a trip in December 2008 to San Diego where they received an award for Best Drum Major in the Big Bay Balloon Parade. The band has also traveled to Hollywood, California, as well as Memphis, Tennessee, where they won the National Parade Award for the Best Marching Band in the parade. The Marching Band also performs at various band shows and festivals throughout the country.

The bands of Dover Area High School include:

- The Dover Eagle Marching Band
- Dominants - A select ensemble
- Jazz Band
- Concert Band
- Symphonic Band
- Pit Orchestra

=== Vocal Music Department ===
The choir department is headed by Ms. Samantha Roberts. She directs the various choir groups of Dover Area High School. Recently, the Renaissance vocal group travelled to San Diego with the marching band.

The choral groups of Dover Area High School are:

- Renaissance - A select choir
- DHS Concert Choir - The Sophomores, Juniors, and Seniors of DHS choir
- Ladies Choir - The female vocal group
- Men's Ensemble - A small male vocal group
- Freshmen Choir - A choir consisting of DHS freshmen, often assisted by upperclassmen

Recently, Dover was named one of the top 100 school districts for music in the nation by the NAMM for the 4th year in a row.

=== Sports ===
The Dover Area School District funds:

Boys

- Baseball - AAA
- Basketball- AAA
- Cross country - AA
- Football - AAA
- Golf - AAA
- Soccer - AA
- Swimming and diving - AA
- Tennis - AAA
- Track and field - AAA
- Volleyball - AA
- Wrestling - AAA

Girls

- Basketball - AAAA
- Cheer - AAAA
- Cross country - AAA
- Field hockey - AAA
- Golf - AAA
- Soccer (Fall) - AAA
- Softball - AAA
- Swimming and diving - AAA
- Tennis - AAA
- Track and field - AAA
- Volleyball - AAA

Intermediate School Sports

Boys

- Basketball
- Cross country
- Football
- Soccer
- Wrestling

Girls

- Basketball
- Cross country
- Field hockey
- Soccer (Fall)
- volleyball

According to PIAA directory July 2012 According to PIAA directory July 2013

== See also ==
- Kitzmiller v. Dover Area School District - ruling against the school district which had required the presentation of "intelligent design" as an alternative to evolution
- 40 Days and 40 Nights (book): History of the creationist controversies in the district.
