= Englehart Melchinger House =

Historic house in Pennsylvania, United States

- U.S. National Register of Historic Places
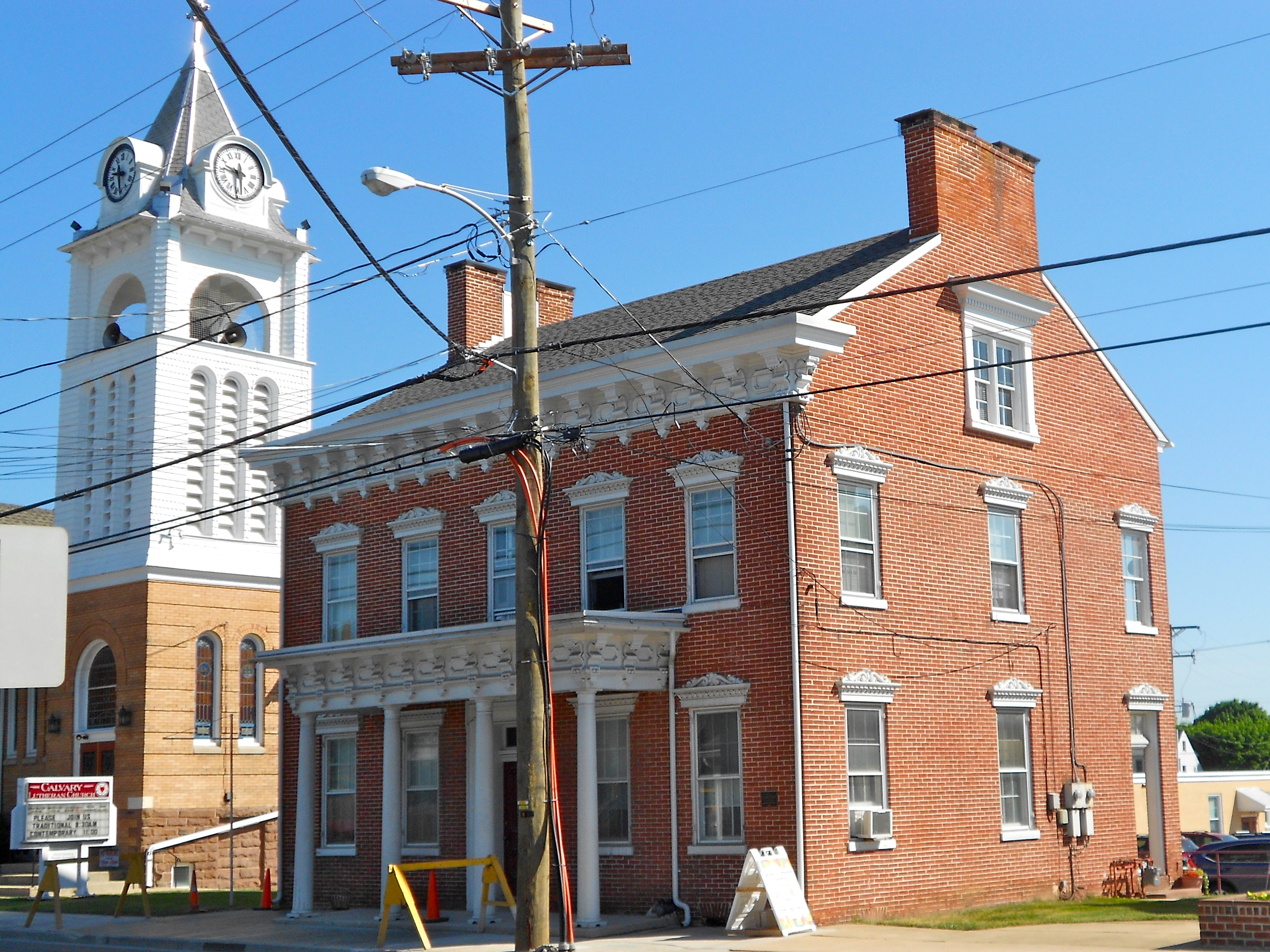
- As viewed from Main Street

- Location within Pennsylvania Location within the United States
- Location: 5 North Main Street; Dover, Pennsylvania
- Coordinates: 40°0′6″N 76°51′3″W
- Area: 0.1 acres (0.040 ha)
- Built: 1852
- Architect: Washington Rodgers; Michael Link
- Architectural style: Greek Revival; Italianate
- NRHP reference No.: 92000990
- Added to NRHP: August 12, 1992

The Englehart Melchinger House in the borough of Dover, York County, Pennsylvania, is the restored home of a prominent 19th Century businessman, Englehart Melchinger. It was built about 1852, and is a rectangular brick building with Greek Revival and Italianate design details. It features an entrance portico with Doric order columns, heavy scroll brackets, and a paneled frieze; and cast iron lintels.

Melchinger was the son of Israel Melchinger, an American Revolutionary War Hessian soldier who settled in Dover after the war rather than returning to Germany. Upon his father's death in 1834; Englehart assumed the role of the town's postmaster. He amassed personal wealth through several business ventures, including a lumber company.

Melchinger was among the large group of Dover residents who suffered losses when Confederate cavalry under J.E.B. Stuart occupied the town on the morning of July 1, 1863, during the Gettysburg campaign. However, the loss of horses and personal property did not have a significant financial effect, and Melchinger prospered.

The home, at 5 North Main Street (Pennsylvania State Route 74), was listed on the National Register of Historic Places on August 12, 1992.

== Gallery ==
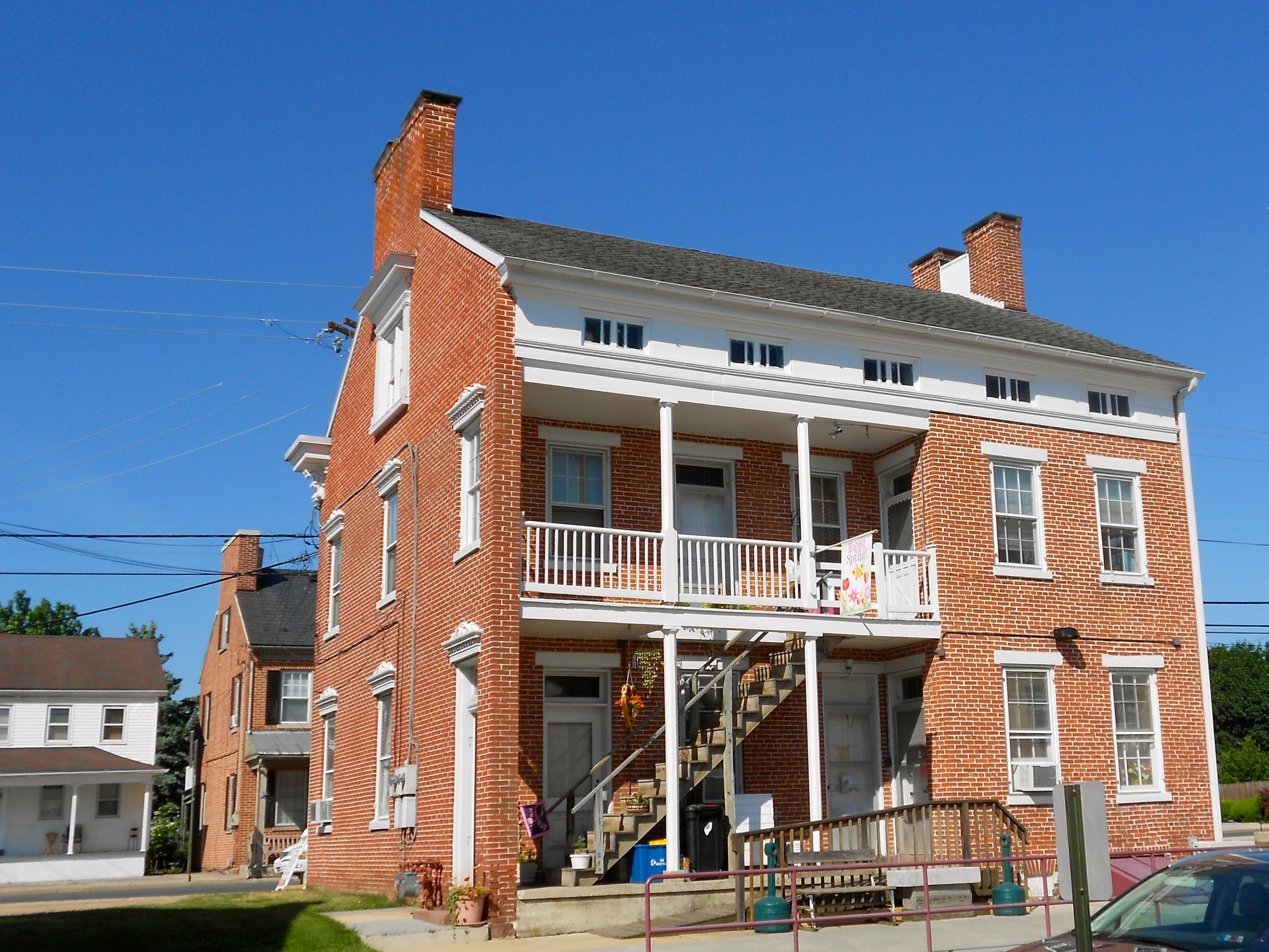
Rear view

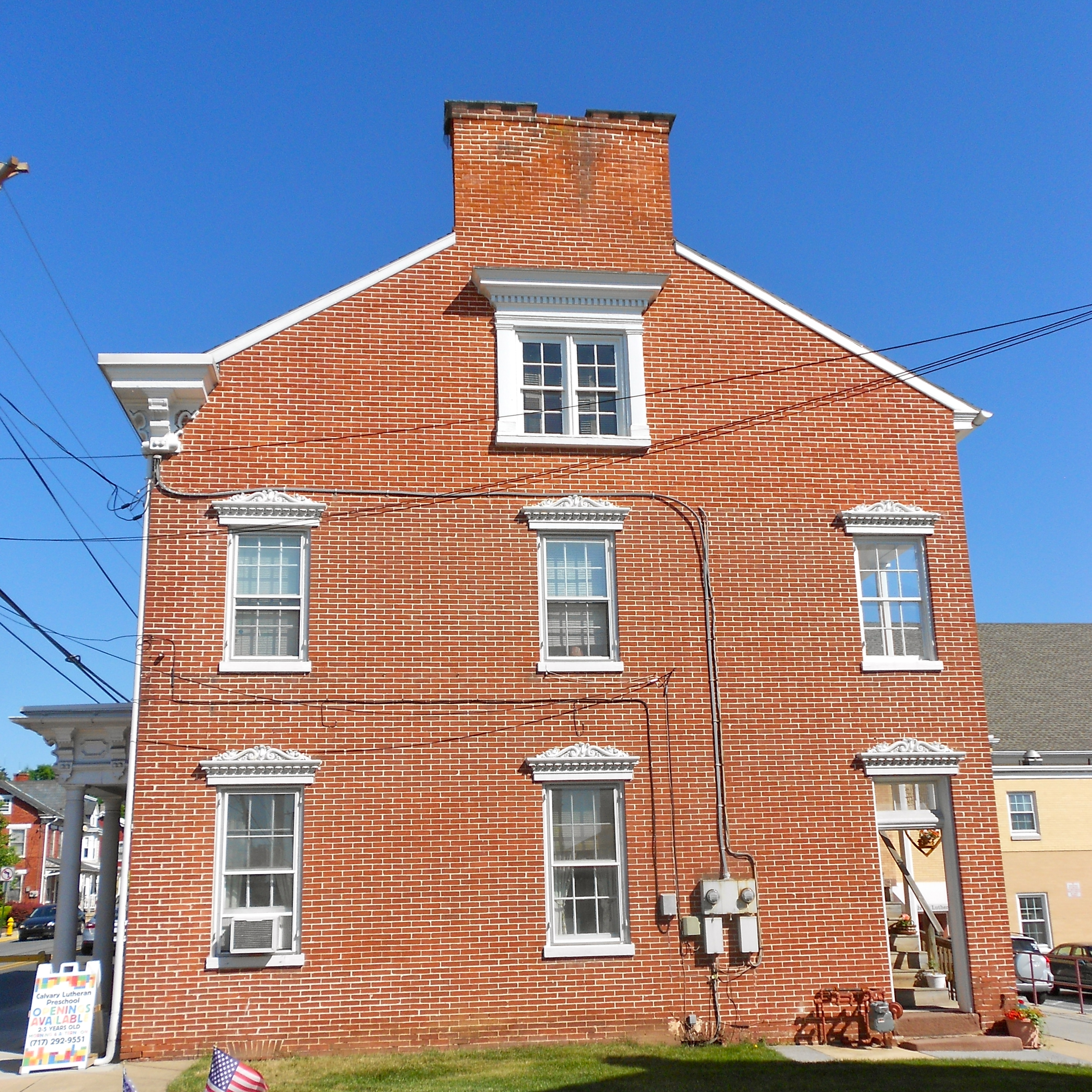
View from the south

== See also ==
- National Register of Historic Places listings in York County, Pennsylvania
