= Dover Area High School =

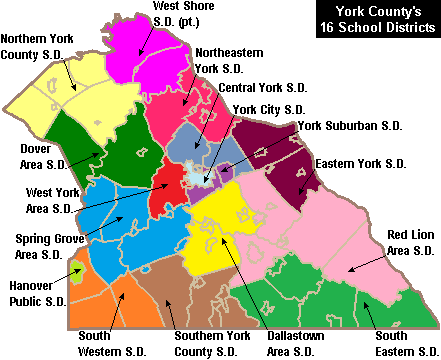

Location
- 1600 Intermediate Avenue; Dover, York County, Pennsylvania 17315; United States; 39.999°N 76.852°W

Information
- Type: Public
- Motto: "Accepting Only Excellence"
- Principal: Big J Jettas
- Teaching staff: 63.00 (FTE)
- Grades: 9-12
- Enrollment: 1,013 (2023-2024)
- Student to teacher ratio: 16.08
- Language: English
- Colors: Red, Silver/White and Black
- Athletics conference: Greater York Conference
- Mascot: Eagles
- Newspaper: The Eagles Eye
- Website: http://www.doversd.org/ former site -https://www.edline.net/pages/Dover_Area_School_District

Dover Area High School is a midsized, suburban public high school located at 4500 Intermediate Avenue in Dover, Pennsylvania. In 2014, enrollment was reported as 1,009 pupils in 9th through 12th grades.

Alternatively, Dover Area High School students may choose to attend York County School of Technology for training in the construction and mechanical trades. The Lincoln Intermediate Unit IU12 provides the school with a wide variety of services like specialized education for disabled students and hearing, speech and visual disability services and professional development for staff and faculty.

== Extracurriculars ==
The Dover Area School District's students have access to a wide variety of clubs, activities and an extensive sports program. The district is part of the York-Adams League for sports.

=== Sports ===
The Dover Area School District funds:

Boys

- Baseball - AAA
- Basketball- AAA
- Cross Country - AA
- Football - AAA
- Golf - AAA
- Soccer - AA
- Swimming and Diving - AAA
- Tennis - AAA
- Track and Field - AAA
- Volleyball - AA
- Wrestling - AAA

Girls

- Basketball - AAAA
- Cheer - AAAA
- Cross Country - AAA
- Field Hockey - AAA
- Golf - AAA
- Soccer (Fall) - AAA
- Softball - AAA
- Swimming and Diving - AA
- Girls' Tennis - AAA
- Track and Field - AAA
- Volleyball - AAA
- E-Sports

Intermediate School Sports

Boys

- Basketball
- Cross Country
- Football
- Soccer
- Wrestling

Girls

- Basketball
- Cross Country
- Field Hockey
- Soccer (Fall)
- volleyball

According to PIAA directory July 2012 According to PIAA directory July 2013

== Notable alumni ==
- Ray Krone, wrongfully convicted of murder
- John Kuhn, football player
- Felito Medina, PettyPineapple LLC
- Jeff Koons, artist

== See also ==
- Kitzmiller v. Dover Area School District - ruling against the school district which had required the presentation of "intelligent design" as an alternative to evolution as an "explanation of the origin of life."
