= Evan Oglesby =

American football player (born 1981)

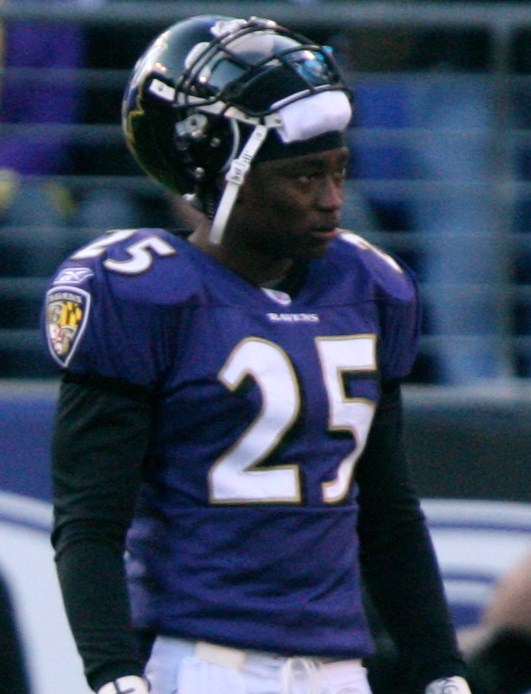
- Oglesby with the Baltimore Ravens in 2006

No. 25, 23, 41, 31
- Position: Cornerback

Personal information
- Born: December 18, 1981 (age 44); Toccoa, Georgia, U.S.
- Listed height: 5 ft 11 in (1.80 m)
- Listed weight: 190 lb (86 kg)

Career information
- High school: Stephens County (Toccoa)
- College: North Alabama
- NFL draft: 2005: undrafted

Career history
- Buffalo Bills (2005)*; Baltimore Ravens (2005–2006); Dallas Cowboys (2007); Baltimore Ravens (2008); Miami Dolphins (2009–2010)
- * Offseason or practice squad member only

Awards and highlights
- 2× All-GSC (2003, 2004); 2× All-South Region (2003, 2004); North Alabama Hall of Fame Inductee (2015); Presidential Volunteer Service Award (2023)

Career NFL statistics
- Total tackles: 38
- Fumble recoveries: 1
- Pass deflections: 12
- Stats at Pro Football Reference

Evan Shawntell Oglesby (born December 18, 1981) is an American former professional football player who was a cornerback for six seasons in the National Football League (NFL) with the Buffalo Bills, Baltimore Ravens, Dallas Cowboys, and Miami Dolphins. He played college football for the North Alabama Lions and was signed by the Bills as an undrafted free agent in 2005.

== Early life ==
Oglesby attended Stephens County High School, where he practiced football and basketball. He had one game where he caught 3 touchdowns. He blocked 24 kicks in his high school career.

He accepted a football scholarship from the NCAA Division II University of North Alabama. As a freshman, he started all 10 games at cornerback, registering 57 tackles, 4 interceptions, 2 forced fumbles, one blocked kick and 13 kickoff returns for 335 yards (25.8 avg.).

As a sophomore, he started in 7 games, making 56 tackles and one interception.

As a junior, he collected 66 tackles (fourth on the team), 2 tackles for loss, 7 interceptions (2 returned for touchdowns), 15 passes defensed, one forced fumble and one fumble recovery. He contributed to the team having a 13–1 record, that included the first perfect 11-0 regular-season in school history, a Gulf South Conference championship and reaching the semifinals of the NCAA Division II playoffs.

As a senior, he tallied 45 tackles (one for loss), one interception, 11 passes defensed and one blocked kick. He played in the Cactus Bowl Division II All-Star Game. He finished his college career as a four-year starter, with 224 tackles (11 for loss), 13 interceptions and 38 passes defensed.

In 2015, he was inducted into the University of North Alabama Athletic Hall of Fame.

== Professional career ==
=== Buffalo Bills ===
Oglesby was signed as an undrafted free agent by the Buffalo Bills after the 2005 NFL draft on April 29. He was waived on September 3 and re-signed to the team's practice squad on September 5. He was released on October 12.

=== Baltimore Ravens (first stint) ===
On December 6, 2005, Oglesby signed with the Baltimore Ravens. He appeared in the last 3 games and had 2 special teams tackles.

In 2006, he appeared 16 games as the third cornerback, making 9 defensive tackles, 8 passes defended and 17 special teams tackles (third on the team). He was cut on September 2, 2007.

=== Dallas Cowboys ===
On September 2, 2007, he was claimed off waivers by the Dallas Cowboys. He appeared in 8 games, posting 2 defensive tackles and 3 special teams tackles.

On March 17, 2008, Oglesby re-signed with the Cowboys as an exclusive-rights free agent. He was cut on September 2, 2008.

=== Baltimore Ravens (second stint) ===
On September 4, 2008, Oglesby was signed as a free agent by the Baltimore Ravens. He had 14 tackles. Though he was non-tendered as a restricted free agent in the 2009 offseason, he was re-signed by the Ravens on March 2. He was released on September 5.

=== Miami Dolphins ===
On November 24, 2009, he was signed by the Miami Dolphins. He was waived on November 28. He was re-signed on December 10, after Lydon Murtha was placed on the injured reserve list. He was cut to make room for Nate Ness on November 3, 2010.
