= Joe Berger =

American football player (born 1982)

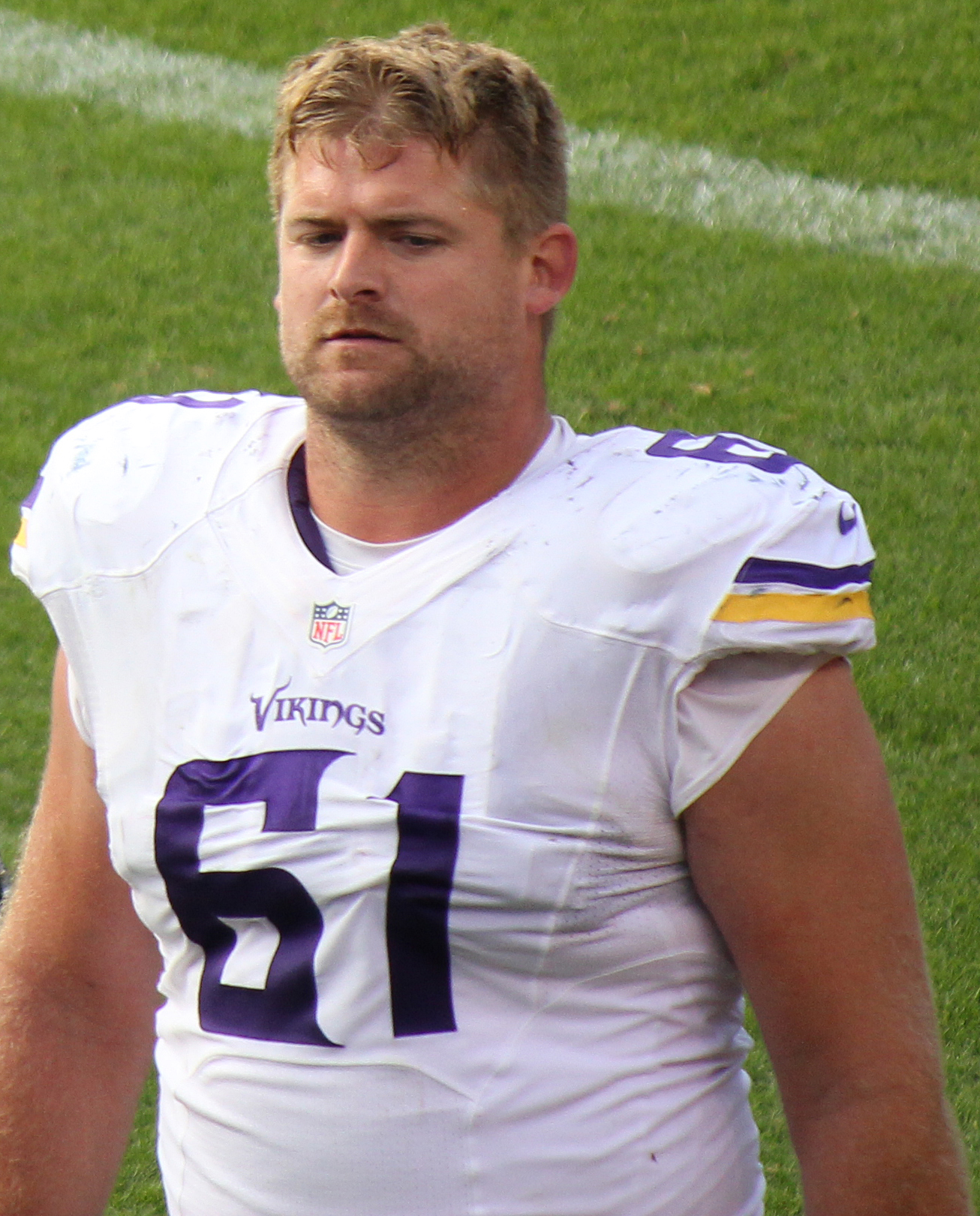
- Berger with the Minnesota Vikings in 2015

No. 65, 67, 61
- Position: Guard

Personal information
- Born: May 25, 1982 (age 44); Fremont, Michigan, U.S.
- Listed height: 6 ft 5 in (1.96 m)
- Listed weight: 305 lb (138 kg)

Career information
- High school: Newaygo (MI)
- College: Michigan Tech
- NFL draft: 2005: 6th round, 207th overall pick

Career history
- Carolina Panthers (2005)*; Miami Dolphins (2005–2006); Dallas Cowboys (2006–2008); Miami Dolphins (2009–2010); Minnesota Vikings (2011–2017)
- * Offseason or practice squad member only

Awards and highlights
- 2× First-team All-GLIAC (2003, 2004)

Career NFL statistics
- Games played: 145
- Games started: 84
- Fumble recoveries: 1
- Stats at Pro Football Reference

Joseph David Berger (/ˈbɜːrdʒər/ BUR-jər; born May 25, 1982) is an American former professional football player who was a guard in the National Football League (NFL) for the Miami Dolphins, Dallas Cowboys and Minnesota Vikings. He was drafted by the Carolina Panthers in the sixth round of the 2005 NFL draft. He played college football at Michigan Tech.

== Early life ==
Berger attended Newaygo High School in Newaygo, Michigan. During his two-year varsity football career, he played as an offensive lineman, and linebacker. He finished with 238 tackles and one interception.

As a senior, he was the team captain, an All-Western Waterways Activities Conference selection, and an Academic All-State honorable-mention.

== College career ==
Berger was a walk-on at Michigan Technological University, where he was converted from a linebacker into an offensive tackle. He started three games at left tackle as a redshirt freshman.

As a junior in 2003, the football program was terminated due to budgets cuts made by the school, but through alumni funding, it was brought back in 10 days. He was lost for the season after suffering a knee injury in a game against Grand Valley State University. As a senior, he contributed to the team win the GLIAC championship.

He finished his college career with 28 games started at right tackle and three at left tackle. He was a four-time Academic All-GLIAC selection, a two-time CoSIDA Academic All-District pick, and a two-time All-American pick as a right tackle. He also played in the Cactus Bowl and the NCAA Division II All-Star game.

== Professional career ==
Pre-draft measurables
Height	Weight	40-yard dash	10-yard split	20-yard split	20-yard shuttle	Three-cone drill	Vertical jump	Broad jump	Bench press
6 ft 5 in (1.96 m)	303 lb (137 kg)	5.20 s	1.86 s	3.04 s	4.62 s	7.77 s	27 in (0.69 m)	8 ft 0 in (2.44 m)	30 reps
All values from NFL Combine

=== Carolina Panthers ===
Berger was selected by the Carolina Panthers with their second of two sixth-round draft choices in the sixth round (207th overall) of the 2005 NFL draft, becoming one of only three football players to be drafted from Michigan Tech and the first since 1987 when the Giants selected quarterback Dave Walter in the 11th round (307th overall). The other Michigan Tech draftee, running back Jim Van Wagner, was selected by the San Francisco 49ers in the seventh round (183rd overall) of the 1977 NFL draft.

He was waived on September 3 and was signed to the practice squad one day later. He would never play in a regular-season game with the franchise.

=== Miami Dolphins (first stint) ===
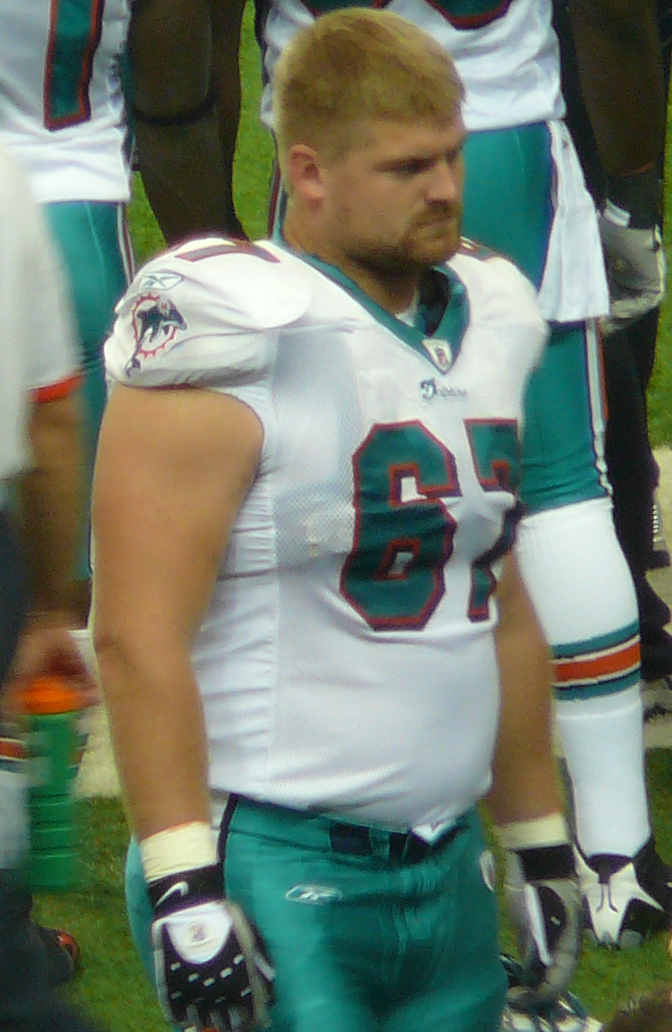
Berger with the Dolphins

On September 7, 2005, he was picked up by the Miami Dolphins from the Panthers practice squad before the start of the season. He was declared inactive in two games and played in each of the final three games as a backup.

In 2006, a sprained right foot suffered in training camp kept him inactive during 11 games. He was waived on November 23.

=== Dallas Cowboys ===
On November 24, 2006, Berger was claimed off waivers by the Dallas Cowboys, but was inactive for the rest of the season (five games). In 2007, he was active for three games, but only played in the 4th quarter of the season finale in place of Leonard Davis at right guard.

In 2008, he played on special teams during the first three games of the season and was declared inactive for the final 11. During his time with the Cowboys, the team had a strong offensive line and Berger had a difficult time competing for playing time.

=== Miami Dolphins (second stint) ===
On February 27, 2009, Berger signed as an unrestricted free agent with the Miami Dolphins, reuniting with former Cowboys head coach Bill Parcells, who was the team's Executive Vice President of Football Operations.

Although he was signed as a backup player, due to his ability to play multiple offensive line positions, he beat out Jake Grove for the starting center position, playing in 31 out of 32 games over the next two seasons, starting 20 of them. He was released on September 5, 2011, before the start of the regular season, after the team signed Ryan Cook.

=== Minnesota Vikings ===
On September 12, 2011, Berger signed with the Minnesota Vikings the day after the regular-season opener. On March 12, 2013, Berger re-signed with the Vikings on a one-year deal.

==== 2011 season ====
Berger spent training camp and preseason with the Miami Dolphins and was acquired by the Vikings on September 12, 2011, the day after the regular-season opener at San Diego. In his first season as a Viking, Berger played in 13 games, starting seven at center, right guard and left guard during the season. He saw extended action at Chicago in week six, replacing injured starter John Sullivan at center in the 2nd half.

He then started a 4-game span at right guard in place of starter Anthony Herrera, with the first of the four games coming at Carolina on October 30. He started his first game of the season at center against the Green Bay Packers in week seven, the first start of rookie quarterback Christian Ponder’s career. He started in the final two games of season at left guard in place of starter Steve Hutchinson.

==== 2012 season ====
In 2012, Berger played in all 16 games. He was primarily used on special teams, where he was a regular on a kickoff return unit that ranked among the NFL leaders in return average and was tied for 3rd in the NFL with six returns of 40 yards or more on the season. He saw his first career playoff action in the NFC Wild Card game against the Green Bay Packers on January 5, 2013.

==== 2013 season ====
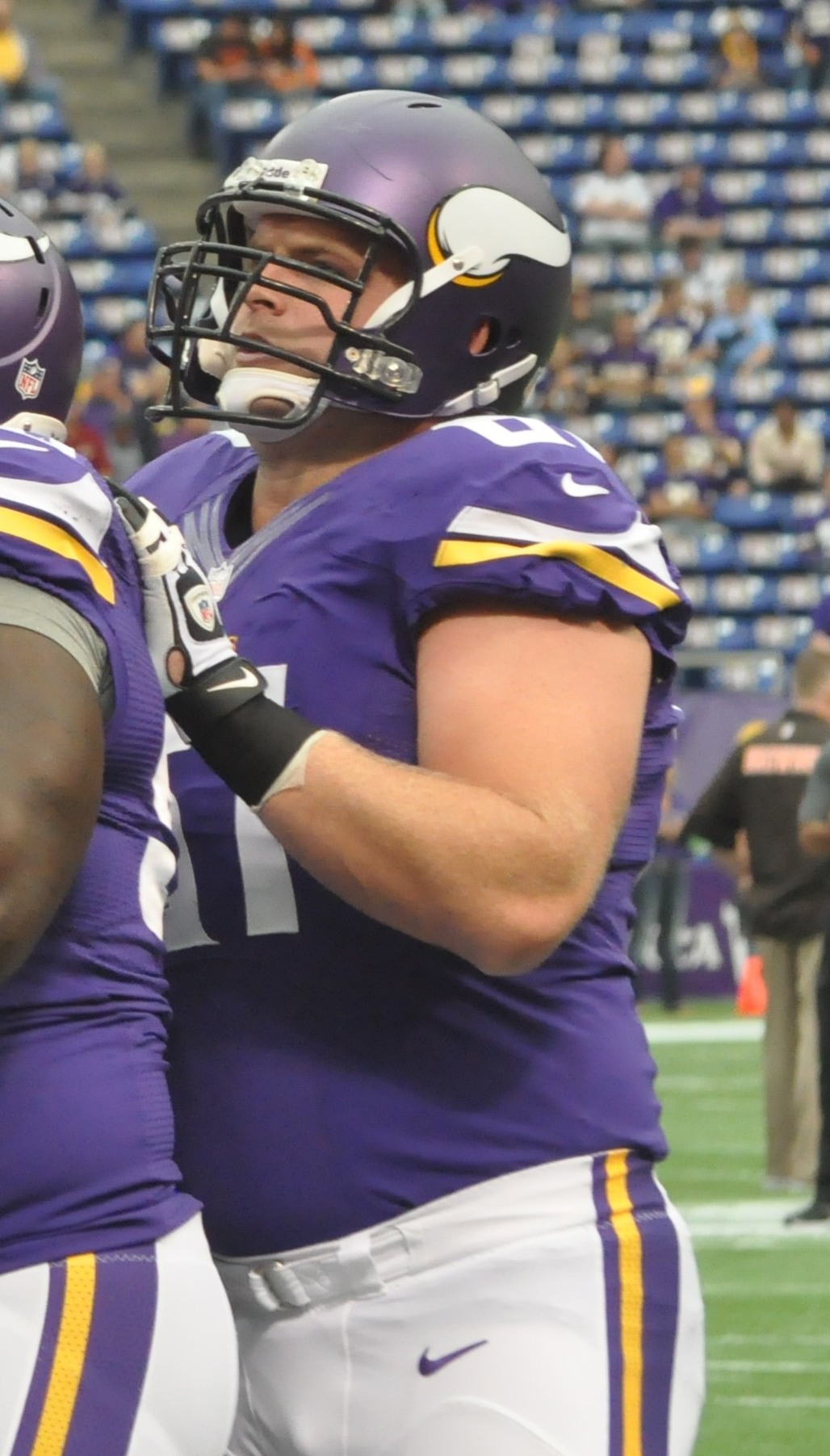
Berger with the Vikings

In 2013, Berger appeared in all 16 games, starting two, contributing on special teams and providing depth along the offensive line. He started at left guard and right guard in place of injured starters Charlie Johnson and Brandon Fusco against Washington and Philadelphia. He played a vital role on a kickoff return unit that helped rookie wide receiver Cordarrelle Patterson set team records for return yards (1,393), return average (32.4) and return touchdowns (2).

==== 2014 season ====
On March 12, 2014, the Vikings re-signed Berger to a one-year contract. Berger appeared in all 16 games and started the final nine games at right guard after starter Brandon Fusco was placed on IR, with the team going 5–4 in his starts and with Berger playing a key role in protecting Teddy Bridgewater on his way to the most productive season by a rookie quarterback in team history.

On October 19, 2014, Berger came into a game against the Buffalo Bills after starting center John Sullivan suffered a concussion; he blocked for rookie running back Jerick McKinnon’s 103-rushing yard effort against one of the NFL’s best run defenses and allowed no sacks and recorded a tackle. Berger finished the season having played in 61 consecutive games.

==== 2015 season ====
In August 2015, starting center John Sullivan suffered a season-ending back injury and was placed on injured reserve. Berger was named as the Vikings starting center and started every game for the 2015 season, helping Adrian Peterson run for a league-leading 1,485 yards and 11 touchdowns. For his performance, Berger was named the league’s best run blocker by Pro Football Focus (PFF).

After 11 years in the league, this was Berger's first NFL season starting all 16 games. On January 6, 2016, Berger was rated +26.8 by Pro Football Focus (PFF), the highest among all centers in the NFL for the season. Over the final half of the regular season, Berger earned an above-average grade of +1.0 or higher in every game, including a peak of +5.3 against a stout Oakland Raiders defensive line in week 10. He was also the most consistent center as he had the lowest percentage of negatively-graded run blocks at the position.

==== 2016 season ====
During training camp, Berger won the battle against veteran John Sullivan to be the Vikings’ starting center. On September 9, the team announced that Berger signed a one-year contract extension. He started 14 games. He missed two contests with a concussion he suffered in the eleventh game against the Detroit Lions.

==== 2017 season ====
After the Vikings drafted center Pat Elflein in the third round, Berger was moved to right guard, where he started all 16 games. He led the offense with 1,116 snaps played, which were at right guard and one game at center, in place for an injured Pat Elflein against the Chicago Bears.

==== Retirement ====
On March 23, 2018, Berger announced his retirement from the NFL after 13 seasons.

== Personal life ==
Berger graduated magna cum laude with a bachelor's degree in mechanical engineering from Michigan Tech in 2005. He married his wife, Abigail, in 2004. They have four children.
