= Dover, Pennsylvania =

Borough in Pennsylvania, US

- Borough
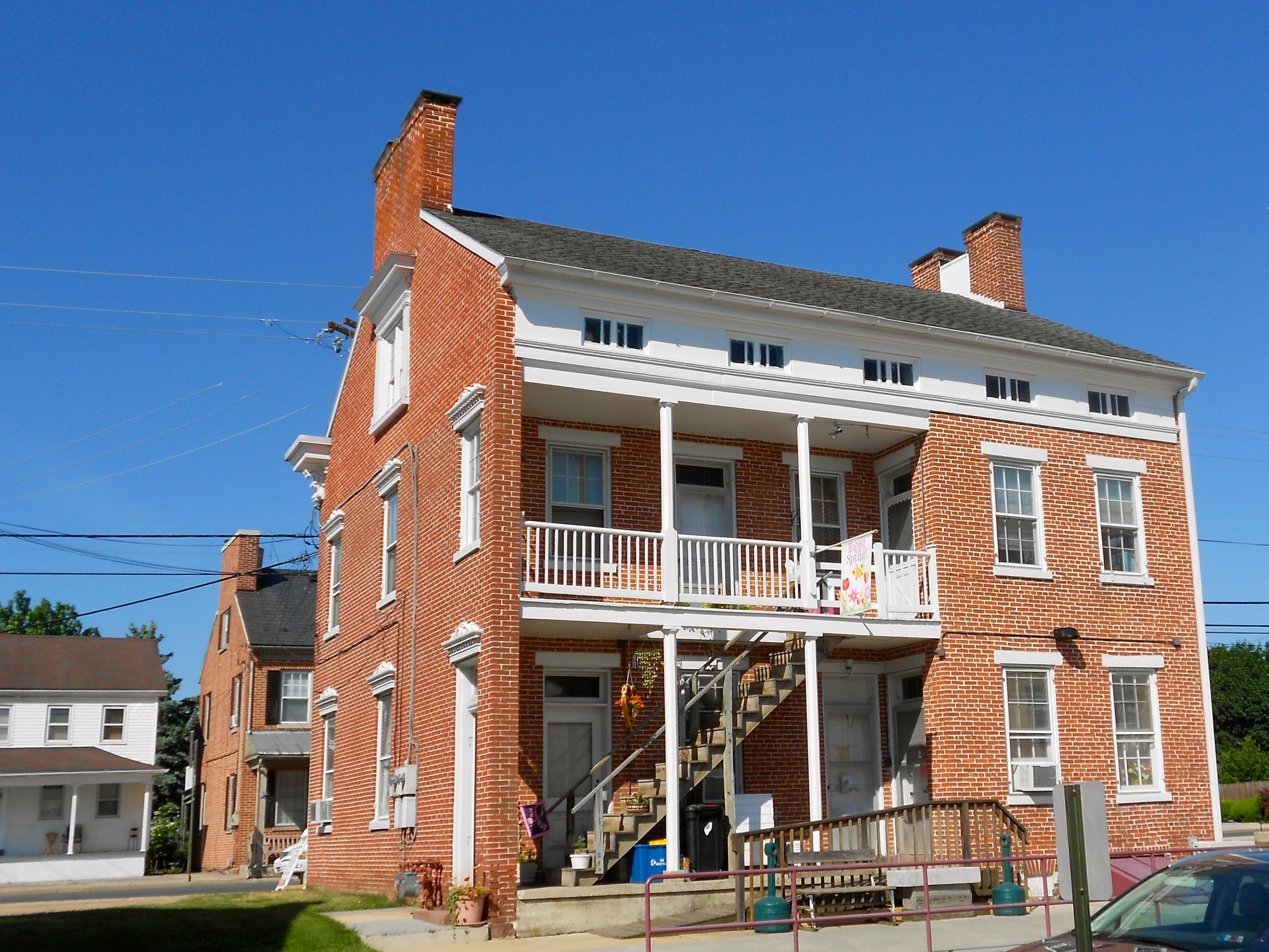
- Englehart Melchinger House

- Location in York County and the U.S. state of Pennsylvania.

- Location of Dover in Pennsylvania Dover (the United States)
- Coordinates: 40°00′14″N 76°50′58″W
- Country: United States
- State: Pennsylvania
- County: York
- Settled: 1764; 262 years ago
- Incorporated: 1864; 162 years ago

Government
  - Type: Borough Council
  - Mayor: Dennis Hernley
  - President: Andrew Kroft

Area
  - Total: 0.54 sq mi (1.41 km^{2})
  - Land: 0.54 sq mi (1.41 km^{2})
  - Water: 0 sq mi (0.00 km^{2})
- Elevation: 443 ft (135 m)

Population (2020)
  - Total: 1,954
  - Density: 3,601/sq mi (1,390.2/km^{2})
- Time zone: UTC-5 (Eastern (EST))
  - Summer (DST): UTC-4 (EDT)
- Zip code: 17315
- Area code: 717; prefixes 292, 308
- FIPS code: 42-19696
- Website: www.doverboroughpa.com

Dover is a borough in York County, Pennsylvania, United States. The population was 1,954 at the 2020 census. The borough is located about eight miles from downtown York.

== History ==
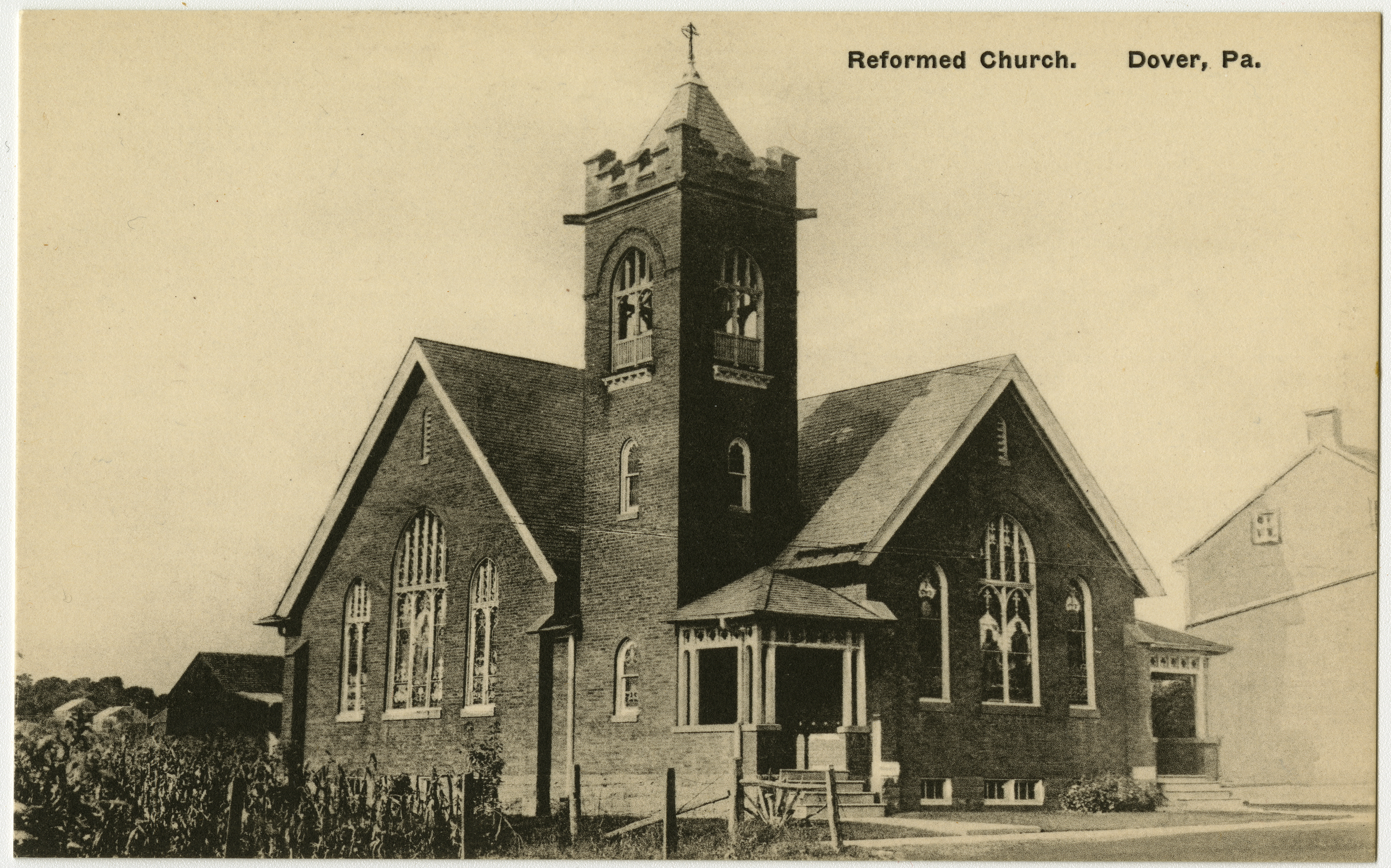
Dover United Church of Christ on a vintage postcard

James Joner purchased 203 acres (0.82 km^{2}) in 1764 and laid out the town of Dover. It was known generally as Joner's Town until 1815, when a Dover post office was established.

During the 1863 Gettysburg campaign of the American Civil War, Dover was briefly occupied overnight, June 30 – July 1, by Confederate cavalry under J.E.B. Stuart.

Dover was incorporated in 1864, 100 years after its founding.

The Englehart Melchinger House was listed on the National Register of Historic Places in 1992.

== Geography ==
Dover is located in York County at 40°0′14″N 76°50′58″W (40.003846, -76.849397), 5 miles (8 km) northwest of the county seat of York. The borough is entirely surrounded by Dover Township.

According to the United States Census Bureau, the borough has a total area of 0.5 square miles (1.3 km^{2}), all land.

== Demographics ==
Historical population
Census	Pop.	Note	%±
1850	246		—
1860	302		22.8%
1870	418		38.4%
1880	415		−0.7%
1890	465		12.0%
1900	438		−5.8%
1910	576		31.5%
1920	535		−7.1%
1930	676		26.4%
1940	733		8.4%
1950	809		10.4%
1960	975		20.5%
1970	1,168		19.8%
1980	1,910		63.5%
1990	1,884		−1.4%
2000	1,815		−3.7%
2010	2,007		10.6%
2020	1,954		−2.6%
2023 (est.)	1,949	▼	−0.3%

As of the census of 2000, there were 1,815 people, 770 households, and 489 families residing in the borough. The population density was 3,623.6 inhabitants per square mile (1,399.1/km^{2}). There were 790 housing units at an average density of 1,577.2 per square mile (609.0/km^{2}). The racial makeup of the borough was 96.47% White, 1.05% African American, 0.39% Native American, 0.83% Asian, 0.72% from other races, and 0.55% from two or more races. Hispanic or Latino of any race were 1.43% of the population.

There were 770 households, out of which 30.3% had children under the age of 18 living with them, 47.9% were married couples living together, 10.1% had a female householder with no husband present, and 36.4% were non-families. 28.2% of all households were made up of individuals, and 5.8% had someone living alone who was 65 years of age or older. The average household size was 2.34 and the average family size was 2.90.

In the borough the population was spread out, with 23.7% under the age of 18, 11.6% from 18 to 24, 30.8% from 25 to 44, 23.7% from 45 to 64, and 10.1% who were 65 years of age or older. The median age was 35 years. For every 100 females there were 98.8 males. For every 100 females age 18 and over, there were 98.9 males.

The median income for a household in the borough was $41,250, and the median income for a family was $46,086. Males had a median income of $33,796 versus $22,826 for females. The per capita income for the borough was $19,108. About 4.3% of families and 6.5% of the population were below the poverty line, including 10.5% of those under age 18 and none of those age 65 or over.

== Education ==
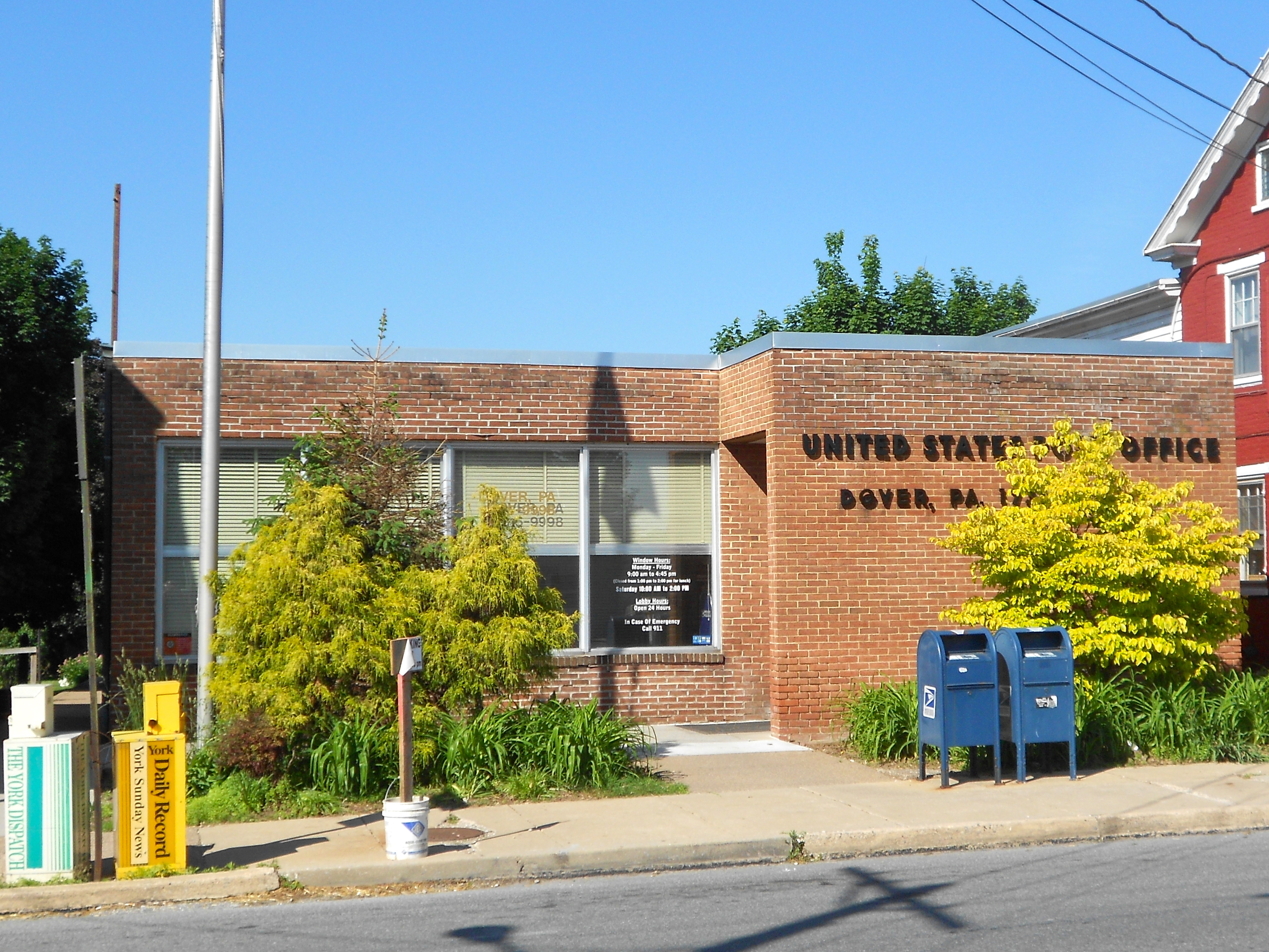
Post office

Dover's public schools are operated by the Dover Area School District.

== Intelligent design controversy ==
Dover received national attention in 2004–05, after the Dover Area School District voted to include the following statement about intelligent design in the biology curriculum of its schools:

The Pennsylvania Academic Standards require students to learn about Darwin's Theory of Evolution and eventually to take a standardized test of which evolution is a part.

Because Darwin's theory is a theory, it continues to be tested as new evidence is discovered. The theory is not a fact. Gaps in the theory exist for which there is no evidence.

A theory is defined as a well-tested explanation that unifies a broad range of observations.

Intelligent Design is an explanation of the origin of life that differs from Darwin's view. The reference book Of Pandas and People is available for students who might be interested in gaining an understanding of what Intelligent Design actually involves.

With respect to any theory, students are encouraged to keep an open mind. The school leaves the discussion of the Origins of Life to individual students and their families. As a Standards-driven district, class instruction focuses upon preparing students to achieve proficiency on Standards-based assessments.

Kitzmiller v. Dover Area School District (page 1)

=== Aftermath ===
The controversial statement by the school board triggered the court case Kitzmiller v. Dover Area School District in late 2005. The case was resolved on December 20, 2005, when Judge John E. Jones III ruled that the Dover Area School District cannot teach Intelligent Design in a science class room, due to its religious origins. The separation of church and state principle, as derived from the First Amendment to the United States Constitution, prohibits any government agency from endorsing religious points of view.

In an upset election on November 8, 2005, the eight Republican school board members who voted for the language were all defeated by the challengers from the Dover Cares slate—four Democrats and four Republicans, forced by election rules to run on the Democratic ticket—who opposed the teaching of intelligent design in a science class.

Over the past few years Dover has incorporated a Comparative Religion course as an elective for students who want to learn more about all the religions of the world.

=== Pat Robertson ===
Two days after the upset, Pat Robertson commented on the election results on The 700 Club:

I'd like to say to the good citizens of Dover: If there is a disaster in your area, don't turn to God. You just rejected Him from your city.

He later revisited his previous warning:

God is tolerant and loving, but we can't keep sticking our finger in His eye forever. If they have future problems in Dover, I recommend they call on Charles Darwin. Maybe he can help them.

== Notable people ==
- Bob Hall, Republican member of the Texas State Senate; former resident of Dover
- Jeff Koons, conceptual artist
- John Kuhn, fullback for the New Orleans Saints
- Christopher Thorn, member of Blind Melon, born in Dover in 1968
