= John Sullivan (center) =

American football player (born 1985)

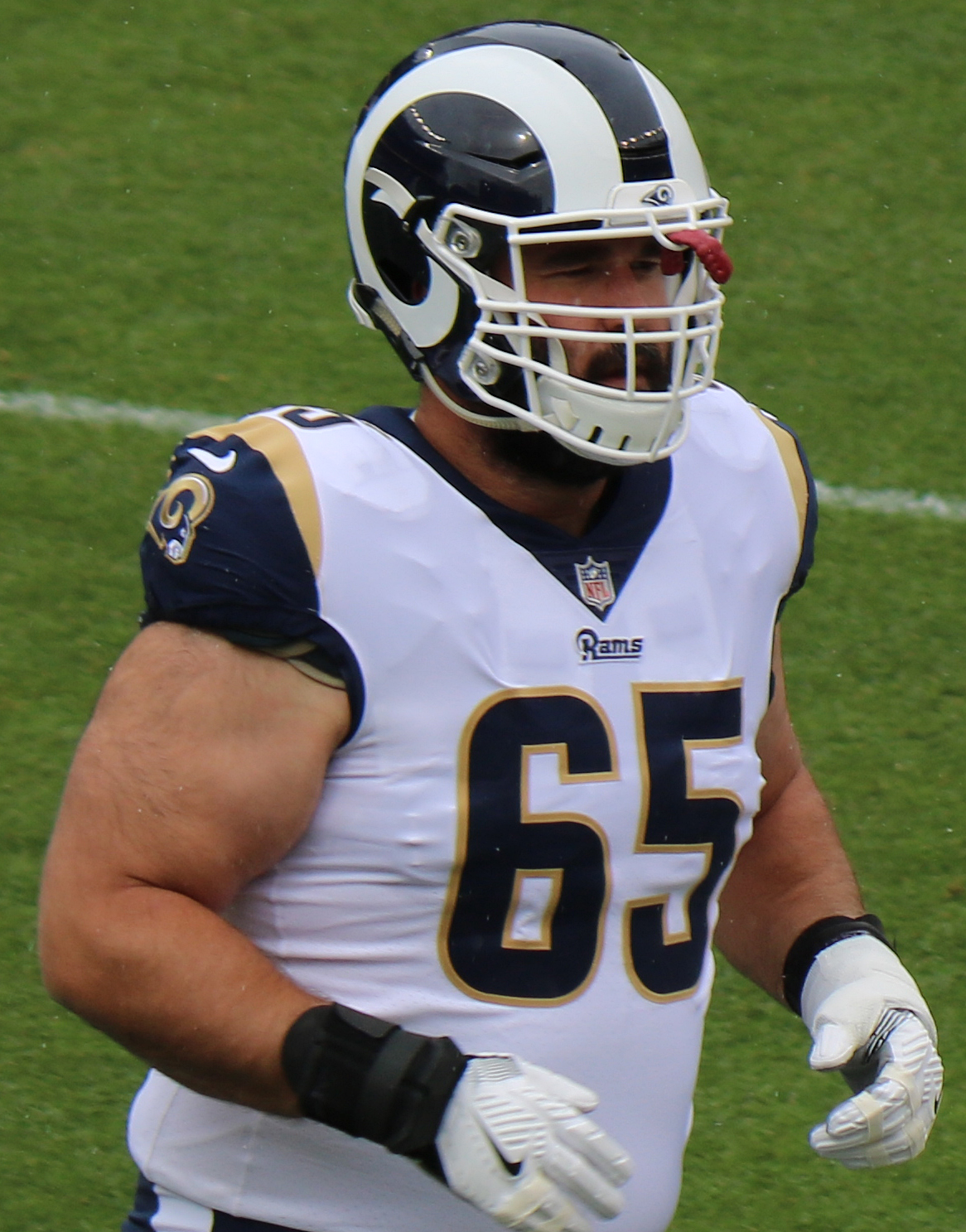
- Sullivan with the Los Angeles Rams in 2018

No. 65, 56
- Position: Center

Personal information
- Born: August 8, 1985 (age 41); Mount Kisco, New York, U.S.
- Listed height: 6 ft 4 in (1.93 m)
- Listed weight: 312 lb (142 kg)

Career information
- High school: Greenwich (Greenwich, Connecticut)
- College: Notre Dame (2003–2007)
- NFL draft: 2008: 6th round, 187th overall pick

Career history
- Minnesota Vikings (2008–2015); Washington Redskins (2016); Los Angeles Rams (2017–2018)

Awards and highlights
- First-team All-Pro (2012); Built Ford Tough Offensive Line of the Year (2018)

Career NFL statistics
- Games played: 153
- Games started: 125
- Stats at Pro Football Reference

John Sullivan (born August 8, 1985) is an American former professional football player who was a center in the National Football League (NFL). He played college football for the Notre Dame Fighting Irish and was selected by the Minnesota Vikings in the sixth round of the 2008 NFL draft, later playing for the Washington Redskins and Los Angeles Rams.

== Early life ==
Sullivan was born in Mount Kisco, New York, but grew up in Old Greenwich, Connecticut. He attended Greenwich High School in Greenwich, the same high school that produced former San Francisco 49ers quarterback Steve Young. There, Sullivan was a Parade and Super Prep All-American, as well as USA Today and ESPN.com second-team prep All-American. He was also named Gatorade Player of the Year in Connecticut. Sullivan was originally an Offensive Tackle as a freshman at Greenwich High School but was then converted to center after the starting center came down with the flu. He was a starter at center during the final three seasons, but also played as a defensive tackle on defense. He was named offensive MVP by the Connecticut Post. In 2002, he helped lead his team to a 12–1–1 mark, including a league title and a spot in Connecticut Class LL title game; for the season, he collected 20 tackles for loss and 12 sacks on defense. He was invited to play in the U.S. Army All-American Bowl in San Antonio, Texas.

In addition to football, Sullivan achieved a 138–6 record as a heavyweight wrestler, winning the state championship as a sophomore, junior and senior. In 2002, he finished second in the Heavyweight Division of the New England High School Wrestling Championships. In 2003, he placed seventh and earned All-America honors at the national wrestling meet. He was also a standout water polo player and also played rugby.

He was regarded as a four-star recruit by Rivals.com. He was rated 61st on the ESPN list of the nation's top 100 prep players, and was also rated number-14 among offensive linemen nationally by CBSSports.com. He chose Notre Dame over scholarship offers from Miami, Boston College, and Michigan, among others.

== College career ==
Sullivan received an athletic scholarship to attend the University of Notre Dame, where he played for the Notre Dame Fighting Irish football team from 2004 to 2007.

== Professional career ==
Pre-draft measurables
Height	Weight	Arm length	Hand span	40-yard dash	10-yard split	20-yard split	20-yard shuttle	Three-cone drill	Vertical jump	Broad jump	Bench press
6 ft 3 1/2 in (1.92 m)	301 lb (137 kg)	31 1/2 in (0.80 m)	10 in (0.25 m)	5.36 s	1.80 s	3.03 s	4.55 s	7.62 s	30 in (0.76 m)	8 ft 7 in (2.62 m)	21 reps
All values from NFL Combine

=== Minnesota Vikings ===
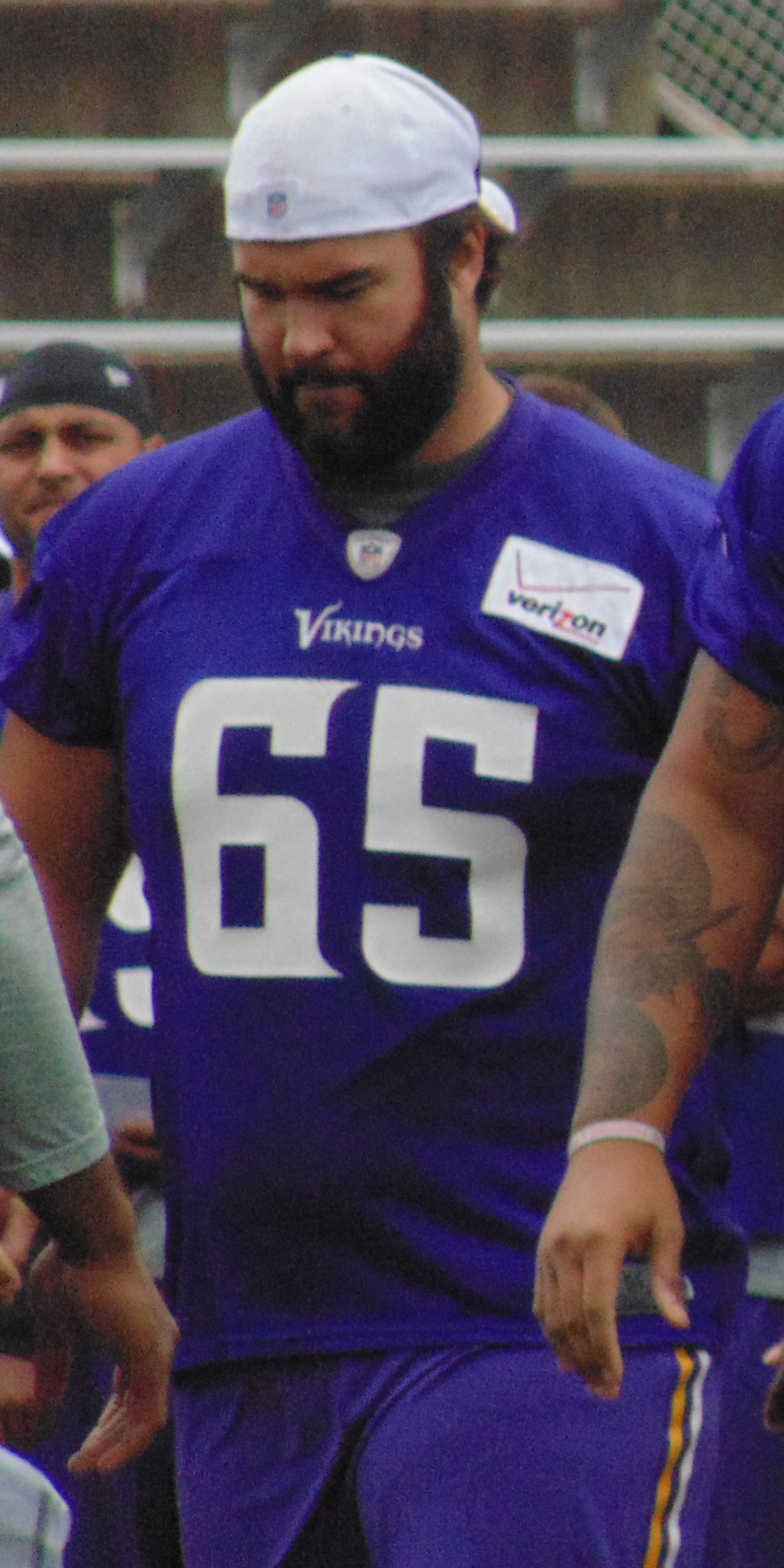
With the Vikings in 2014

Sullivan went into the 2008 NFL draft as a fifth-year senior. Although his physical attributes were less than many in his position, he was rated as the fourth-best center in the draft, projected to be picked in the third or fourth round. The first four rounds passed with fellow centers Mike Pollak, Cody Wallace and Kory Lichtensteiger all selected ahead of Sullivan. He was eventually selected by the Minnesota Vikings with the 21st pick of the sixth round (187th overall).

After spending a year as backup to starting center Matt Birk, Sullivan was promoted to the starting position after Birk joined the Baltimore Ravens as a free agent in 2009. That year, he started every game as the Vikings and their new quarterback Brett Favre improved their offensive ranking to No. 5 in the league (No. 8 in passing). The following year, he struggled with a calf injury and missed back-to-back games away to the New York Jets and at home to the Dallas Cowboys, with Ryan Cook and Jon Cooper respectively filling in. He missed one more game in 2011, a Week 7 matchup against the Green Bay Packers in which Joe Berger took his place. As a reward for his efforts, Sullivan was given a five-year, $25 million contract extension by the Vikings on December 17, 2011.

The following season, he anchored the Vikings' offensive line as they provided the platform for RB Adrian Peterson to reach 2,097 rushing yards for the season, eight yards short of the single-season record held by Eric Dickerson. His performances throughout the season saw him named in the Pro Football Writers Association's All-Pro team; nevertheless, he missed the cut for the Pro Bowl, the center spot going to Max Unger of the Seattle Seahawks. Following the Vikings' elimination from the playoffs Sullivan underwent microfracture surgery on his left knee.

On August 30, 2016, Sullivan was released by the Vikings.

=== Washington Redskins ===
On September 27, 2016, Sullivan signed with the Washington Redskins.

=== Los Angeles Rams ===
On April 5, 2017, Sullivan signed with the Los Angeles Rams. He started 15 games at center for the Rams in 2017.

On March 16, 2018, Sullivan signed a two-year contract with the Rams. In 2018, Sullivan started all 16 games and helped the Rams reach Super Bowl LIII after they defeated the Dallas Cowboys in the divisional round and the New Orleans Saints in the NFC Championship Game. The Rams lost to the New England Patriots in the Super Bowl. On March 5, 2019, the Rams declined the option on Sullivan's contract, making him an unrestricted free agent.
