= Cactus Bowl (Division II) =

Cactus Bowl (defunct)
- Logo for the 2011 game
- Stadium: Javelina Stadium (2001–2011); Fargodome (1994–2000)
- Location: Kingsville, Texas (2001–2011); Fargo, North Dakota (1994–2000)
- Operated: 1994–2011

Sponsors
- Valero (2008–2010); Whataburger (2002–2006)

Former names
- Snow Bowl (1994–2000)

The Cactus Bowl (formerly the Snow Bowl) was a postseason college football all-star game played each January in Kingsville, Texas, which showcased the best NFL draft prospects of those collegiate players who had completed their eligibility in NCAA Division II. First played in 1994 at the Fargodome in Fargo, North Dakota, as the Snow Bowl, the game moved to Javelina Stadium on the campus of Texas A&M University–Kingsville in 2001 as the Cactus Bowl. Proceeds went to the Shriners Hospitals for Children.

The game typically consisted of 88 total players; in all but the final year, teams were designated East and West, composed of players from those regions of the United States. The game gave NFL scouts a chance to view the relatively low profile Division II talent, prompting its slogan of "the best players you've never seen." The bowl's website (now defunct) said that more than 100 players of the game later signed with the NFL. The bowl lasted through 2011, after which it was merged with the USA College Football Bowl of NCAA Division III.

== Winner ==
| Date | Winning team | | Losing team | | Venue | Att. | Ref. |
|---|---|---|---|---|---|---|---|
| January 6, 1994 | West | 23 | East | 14 | Fargodome | 5,962 | |
| January 7, 1995 | West | 16 | East | 10 | Fargodome | | |
| January 13, 1996 | East | 10 | West | 7 | Fargodome | | |
| January 11, 1997 | West | 43 | East | 3 | Fargodome | | |
| January 10, 1998 | West | 15 | East | 12 (OT) | Fargodome | | |
| January 9, 1999 | West | 30 | East | 28 | Fargodome | | |
| January 15, 2000 | West | 24 | East | 22 | Fargodome | 6,248 | |
| January 12, 2001 | West | 33 | East | 33 | Javelina Stadium | | |
| January 11, 2002 | East | 42 | West | 12 | Javelina Stadium | | |
| January 10, 2003 | East | 19 | West | 7 | Javelina Stadium | | |
| January 9, 2004 | West | 30 | East | 27 (OT) | Javelina Stadium | | |
| January 7, 2005 | East | 18 | West | 15 | Javelina Stadium | | |
| January 6, 2006 | West | 49 | East | 28 | Javelina Stadium | | |
| 2007 | Game not played | | | | Javelina Stadium | | |
| January 11, 2008 | East | 42 | West | 13 | Javelina Stadium | | |
| January 9, 2009 | West | 28 | East | 27 | Javelina Stadium | | |
| January 8, 2010 | West | 16 | East | 0 | Javelina Stadium | | |
| January 7, 2011 | Red Storm | 28 | Blue Devils | 6 | Javelina Stadium | 4,200 | |

Overall records: West over East (10–5–1) and Red Storm over Blue Devils (1–0)

== Most Valuable Players ==
| Year | Offensive MVP | | Defensive MVP | | Jim Langer Offensive Lineman | |
| Year | Player | School | Player | School | Player | School |
|---|---|---|---|---|---|---|
| 1994 | Elvin Ashley | Southwest Minnesota | Anthony Abrams | Clark | Kevin Robson | North Dakota |
| 1995 | Keith Rylance | Augustana | Cedric Florence | Missouri Southern | Adam Timmerman | South Dakota State |
| 1996 | Chris Ryan | Clark | Ronald McKinnon | North Alabama | Chris Villarrial | Indiana (Pa.) |
| 1997 | Jason Davis | Western State | Richard Jordan | Missouri Southern | Andy Mazurek | Minnesota State |
| 1998 | Billy Holmes | Northern Colorado | Paul Spicer | Saginaw Valley | Sean McNamara | Pittsburg State |
| 1999 | MarTay Jenkins | Nebraska-Omaha | Franco Glaze | West Texas A&M | Greg Lotyse | North Dakota |
| 2000 | Corte McGuffey | Northern Colorado | Josh Gentry | Indianapolis | Nick O'Brien | Texas A&M–Kingsville |
| 2001 | Gerald Payne | Harding | J.R. Turner | Texas A&M–Kingsville | Brian Crawford | Western Oregon |
| 2002 | Clarence Coleman | Ferris State | Keyon Nash | Albany State | Peter Campion | North Dakota State |
| 2003 | Michael Oliva | Cal-Davis | Steve Josue | Carson–Newman | Phil Bogle | New Haven |
| 2004 | Tyler Paul | Emporia State | Eric McDowell | Missouri Western | Alan Dunn | Tusculum |
| 2005 | Justin Samples | Catawba | Keyonta Marshall | Grand Valley State | Joe Berger | Michigan Tech |
| 2006 | Wes Beschorner | South Dakota | Clayton Ferrell | Abilene Christian | Nick Hageman | South Dakota |
| 2008 | Mark Nicolet | Hillsdale | Michael Eubanks | Delta State | Brandon Barnes | Grand Valley State |
| 2009 | Keith Null | West Texas A&M | Jeff Souder | Nebraska-Omaha | Jeremy Ashcraft | Arkansas Tech |
| 2010 | Billy Garza | Texas A&M–Kingsville | Sam Scott | West Chester | J'Marcus Webb | West Texas A&M |
| 2011 | Eric Czerniewski | Central Missouri | Marc Schiechl | Colorado School of Mines | Trevis Turner | Abilene Christian University |

== Players in the NFL ==
Cactus Bowl players (2001–2010) who later appeared in the NFL.

| Year | Name | School | Initial NFL Team | Round-Overall or Free Agent |
|---|---|---|---|---|
| 2001 | Marc Cerqua | Carson–Newman | Tampa Bay Buccaneers | FA |
| 2001 | Dondre Gilliam | Millersville | San Diego Chargers | FA |
| 2001 | Kendrick Office | West Alabama | Buffalo Bills | FA |
| 2001 | Dominic Rhodes | Midwestern State | Indianapolis Colts | FA |
| 2001 | Ronald Smith | Lane | Cincinnati Bengals | FA |
| 2001 | Josh Stamer | South Dakota | Buffalo Bills | FA |
| 2001 | Ben Steele | Mesa State | Green Bay Packers | FA |
| 2001 | Colston Weatherington | Central Missouri | Dallas Cowboys | 7-207 |
| 2002 | James Atkins | Virginia Union | Tennessee Titans | FA |
| 2002 | Keyon Nash | Albany State | Oakland Raiders | 6-189 |
| 2002 | Jared Peck | North Dakota State | Atlanta Falcons | FA |
| 2002 | Erik Totten | Western Washington | Pittsburgh Steelers | FA |
| 2003 | Khalid Abdullah | Mars Hill | Cincinnati Bengals | 5-136 |
| 2003 | Phillip Bogle | New Haven | San Diego Chargers | FA |
| 2003 | Jacques Cesaire | Southern Connecticut | San Diego Chargers | FA |
| 2003 | Clarence Coleman | Ferris State | Buffalo Bills | FA |
| 2003 | Todd Devoe | Central Missouri | Denver Broncos | FA |
| 2003 | Anthony Dunn | Northern Colorado | Tennessee Titans | FA |
| 2003 | Steve Josue | Carson–Newman | Green Bay Packers | 7-257 |
| 2003 | Ben Nelson | St. Cloud State | Minnesota Vikings | FA |
| 2003 | Ian Smart | C. W. Post | Tampa Bay Buccaneers | FA |
| 2003 | Chaun Thompson | West Texas A&M | Cleveland Browns | 2-052 |
| 2003 | Reggie Wells | Clarion | Arizona Cardinals | 6-177 |
| 2004 | Jordan Babineaux | Southern Arkansas | Seattle Seahawks | FA |
| 2004 | Clarence Glymph | Carson–Newman | Atlanta Falcons | FA |
| 2004 | Ryan Krause | Nebraska-Omaha | San Diego Chargers | 6-169 |
| 2004 | Ruvell Martin | Saginaw Valley State | Green Bay Packers | FA |
| 2004 | Glenn Martinez | Saginaw Valley State | Detroit Lions | FA |
| 2005 | Joe Berger | Michigan Tech | Carolina Panthers | 6-207 |
| 2005 | Kris Griffin | Indiana (Pa.) | Kansas City Chiefs | FA |
| 2005 | Todd Herremans | Saginaw Valley State | Philadelphia Eagles | 4-126 |
| 2005 | Michael Koenen | Western Washington | Atlanta Falcons | FA |
| 2005 | John Kuhn | Shippensburg | Pittsburgh Steelers | FA |
| 2005 | Keyonta Marshall | Grand Valley State | Philadelphia Eagles | 7-247 |
| 2005 | LeRon McCoy | Indiana (Pa.) | Arizona Cardinals | 7-226 |
| 2005 | Evan Oglesby | North Alabama | Baltimore Ravens | FA |
| 2005 | Leonard Weaver | Carson–Newman | Seattle Seahawks | FA |
| 2005 | Chris Wilson | Northwood | Washington Redskins | FA |
| 2005 | Derrick Wimbush | Fort Valley State | Jacksonville Jaguars | FA |
| 2006 | Richard Collier | Valdosta State | Jacksonville Jaguars | FA |
| 2006 | John DiGiorgio | Saginaw Valley State | Buffalo Bills | FA |
| 2006 | Jahri Evans | Bloomsburg | New Orleans Saints | 4-108 |
| 2006 | Brent Grimes | Shippensburg | Atlanta Falcons | FA |
| 2006 | Kenny Onatolu | Nebraska-Omaha | Minnesota Vikings | FA |
| 2006 | Jamaica Rector | Northwest Missouri State | Dallas Cowboys | FA |
| 2006 | A. J. Schable | South Dakota | Arizona Cardinals | FA |
| 2006 | Lee Vickers | North Alabama | Baltimore Ravens | FA |
| 2006 | Delanie Walker | Central Missouri | San Francisco 49ers | 6-175 |
| 2008 | Brandon Carr | Grand Valley State | Kansas City Chiefs | 5-140 |
| 2008 | Alex Hall | St. Augustine's | Cleveland Browns | 7-231 |
| 2008 | Maurice Leggett | Valdosta State | Kansas City Chiefs | FA |
| 2009 | K. C. Asiodu | Central Oklahoma | St. Louis Rams | FA |
| 2009 | Charly Martin | West Texas A&M | Carolina Panthers | FA |
| 2009 | Zach Miller | Nebraska-Omaha | Jacksonville Jaguars | 6-180 |
| 2009 | Keith Null | West Texas A&M | St. Louis Rams | 6-196 |
| 2009 | Dan Skuta | Grand Valley State | Cincinnati Bengals | FA |
| 2009 | Gregory Toler | St. Paul's | Arizona Cardinals | 4-131 |
| 2010 | Jermelle Cudjo | Central Oklahoma | St. Louis Rams | FA |
| 2010 | Dominique Curry | California (Pa.) | St. Louis Rams | FA |
| 2010 | Jimmy Saddler-McQueen | Texas A&M–Kingsville | Dallas Cowboys | FA |
| 2010 | Eugene Sims | West Texas A&M | St. Louis Rams | 6-189 |
| 2010 | J'Marcus Webb | West Texas A&M | Chicago Bears | 7-218 |

== See also ==
- List of college bowl games
