= Comparative dental analysis =

Human identification by forensic scientists can be done by three primary methods: friction ridge analysis, DNA analysis, and comparative dental analysis, the latter of which is one of the duties of a forensic odontologist. It is the process of identification by a post-mortem dental examination of a deceased individual (or individuals); comparing those findings with the ante-mortem dental records, radiographs, study casts, and so on believed to be those of the individual (or individuals) implicated; and assessing the concordance and/or discrepancy between the two. Teeth are resilient and—along with the highly specific and unique type, location, and configuration of restorations—might be the only features usable for the identification of bodies found in burnt, decomposed, skeletonised, or macerated condition.

== Methodology ==
The appointed forensic odontologist notes down all dental findings in a post-mortem intra-oral examination. It can also include taking dental radiographs and/or photographs wherever possible. Ante-mortem dental records are provided (by the police) of the suspected missing person/persons. The forensic odontologist then compares the post-mortem dental findings with those of the ante-mortem records and gives a conclusion on the established identification in the form of a dental report. This dental report can be further taken into evidence to either confirm identification or to present in court in criminal cases.

=== Applications ===
- Single body identifications:

• Unidentified bodies disfigured beyond recognition
• Fire accident victims
• Drowning victims
• Severely decomposed bodies
• Skeletonised remains

- Multiple identifications/ mass disasters:

• Mass fatality accidents
• Mass graves
• Natural calamities
• Mass shootings

== Cases ==
- The identification of Lollia Paulina in 49 AD was the first reported case of dental identification of an individual. Agrippina, the wife of Roman Emperor Claudius ordered her soldiers to kill Lollia who was the first wife of the Emperor. After killing Lollia Paulina, the soldiers bought her head to Agrippina who identified her with her unique teeth.
- John Talbot, the first Earl of Shrewsbury was identified based on his missing left molar by his personal herald.
- Dr. Joseph Warren was identified with his ivory and gold prosthesis made by Paul Revere when he was killed in the Battle of Bunker hill.
- John Wilkes Booth who assassinated Abraham Lincoln was identified by his abnormal jaw and his gold restorations.
- About 126 people were killed in the fire in Bazar de la Charite and due to the severity of the burns, most of the bodies were identified based on their teeth.
- Adolf Hitler who committed suicide in 1945 was identified by his prosthesis in 1968.
- When 158 victims aboard the Scandinavian Star ferry were burnt to death, comparative dental identification was used to identify 107 victims.
- After the 9/11 disaster, hundreds of victims were identified based on their dental remains.
- When thousands of people were killed in the tsunami in Phuket, Thailand, most of the international victims were identified based on dental comparison.
