= American Society of Forensic Odontology =

Founded in 1970, the American Society of Forensic Odontology (ASFO) promotes interest and research in the field of forensic odontology (forensic dentistry). Prior to the formation of the ASFO, involvement in forensic odontology was limited to those dentists who were affiliated with the Armed Forces Institute of Pathology (AFIP) or other law enforcement and scientific organizations such as the American Academy of Forensic Sciences. Credited as one of the founders of the ASFO, Colonel Robert Boyers of the AFIP recognized the need to provide such inclusive opportunity for education and advancement in the field for all interested individuals.

As membership in the ASFO began to grow in the 1970s, the decision was made to meet annually in conjunction with the American Academy of Forensic Sciences. Sponsorship of the scientific session at the annual meeting provided the opportunity for newer, less experienced members to meet and interact with more experienced peers. Additionally, the joint meeting provided individuals from a variety of forensic disciplines a chance to become familiar with forensic odontology and the ASFO organization. Membership has continued to grow and now includes over 480 active members making it one of the largest worldwide organizations dedicated to this forensic discipline. Membership in the ASFO remains open to any individual interested in developing their knowledge of forensic odontology.

== Publications ==
In 1980, Drs. Robert Siegel and Norman Sperber compiled the ASFO Forensic Odontology Workbook. Over the years, many Society members contributed to this effort which led to the publishing of the "Manual of Forensic Odontology". Currently in the fifth edition, this manual provides a general reference for forensic dentists and others studying the science. This reference manual covers a wide variety of subjects encompassed in forensic odontology some of which include: human identification, bite mark analysis, abuse and neglect as well as current technology and advancements in the field matter.

== Education and research ==
In addition to the annual scientific session, the ASFO provides various opportunities for continuing education through course listings and online case presentations. To encourage further investiagion in the field, research grants are available through the ASFO Research Committee through an application process available online. Links to other significant forensic organizations are also provided on the ASFO web site.

== Objective ==
The objective of this Society shall be to advance the cause of forensic dentistry and to develop and maintain the highest standards of practice. This shall be done via study, discussion, seminars, publications and liaison with other organized agencies.
