= Ray Krone =

American wrongfully convicted of murder

Ray Krone (born January 19, 1957) is an American who was wrongfully convicted of murder. He was the 100th inmate exonerated from death row since the death penalty in the United States was reinstated in 1976.

Krone was born and raised in Dover Township, York County, Pennsylvania and graduated from Dover Area High School in 1974.

He was labeled the "Snaggletooth Killer" and spent 10 years in prison, including two years on death row, after being found guilty of killing a bartender in Phoenix, Arizona in 1991.Krone was convicted in 1992 following a trial in which bite-mark identification was a central part of the prosecution's evidence. The Arizona Supreme Court reversed his convictions in 1995 because of the late disclosure of a forensic videotape and ordered a new trial. He was convicted again in 1996 before DNA testing led to his exoneration in 2002.

On April 8, 2002, Krone was released from prison after DNA evidence proved that he did not murder the victim and identified the killer: Kenneth Phillips, who had previously been convicted of kidnapping and attempted child molestation. Phillips pleaded guilty to the murder in 2006 and was sentenced to 53 years to life in prison. Journalist Robert Nelson later wrote that ample crime scene evidence and interviews should have excluded Krone as a suspect, and all pointed toward Phillips, but these data were ignored by the police and the prosecution's purported experts. In 2005, Krone received a settlement of $1.4 million from Maricopa County and $3 million from the city of Phoenix.

Since Krone's release, he has become an activist working for the abolition of the death penalty, and he is the director of Membership and Training for Witness to Innocence. On July 10, 2003, his case became one of the episodes of Forensic Files (season 8, episode 7 "Once Bitten"). His case was also featured on Death Row Stories in Season 5, episode 8 entitled "Once bitten, twice tried". In February 2005, he was featured in episodes 13 and 14 of the third season of the reality television show Extreme Makeover. His story is detailed in Jingle Jangle: The Perfect Crime Turned Inside Out, written by Jim Rix, his cousin, who was instrumental in getting him freed from prison.

== Investigation and arrest ==
On December 29, 1991, Kim Ancona was found murdered at the CBS Restaurant and Lounge in Phoenix, Arizona, where she worked. Investigators collected physical evidence from the crime scene, including biological material and suspected bite marks on the victim's body. Ray Krone, a United States Postal Service employee who knew Ancona and regularly visited the establishment, became a suspect during the investigation. Krone denied any involvement in the murder. However, investigators took impressions of his teeth and compared them with the marks found on the victim’s body. The apparent similarities between Krone’s dental impressions and the bite marks became one of the key pieces of evidence used by the prosecution to support his conviction, despite later disputes over the reliability of this type of evidence and whether it could accurately identify a suspect.

According to the National Registry of Exonerations, a friend of Kim Ancona told investigators that Ancona had mentioned a man named Ray who was expected to help her close the bar on the night of the murder. Krone's name was also found in Ancona's address book. On December 30, 1991, investigators collected blood, hair, saliva, and dental impressions from Krone. His teeth included a distinctive irregularity caused by an earlier traffic accident. Forensic examiners compared his dental impressions with the marks on Ancona's body and reported similarities. On December 31, 1991, Krone was arrested and charged with first-degree murder, kidnapping, and sexual assault. These charges were based in significant part on the disputed dental identification, which later became a central issue in his criminal proceedings.

== First trial and forensic evidence ==
Ray Krone’s first trial began in July 1992 in the Maricopa County Superior Court in Arizona. The prosecution relied heavily on forensic odontology, the examination of dental evidence, to connect Krone to the murder of Kim Ancona.

During the proceedings, forensic odontologist Raymond Rawson prepared a videotape comparing impressions of Krone’s teeth with the suspected bite marks found on Ancona’s body. The video included dental casts, Styrofoam impressions, and computed tomography (CT) scans to demonstrate what the prosecution presented as a match between the bite marks on the victim’s body and Krone’s teeth.

The videotape became a major point of dispute during the legal proceedings. Prosecutors provided the video to Krone’s defense attorney on July 24, 1992, only three days before the trial began.

In addition, the defense requested that the video be excluded from evidence or, at a minimum, that the trial be postponed to allow additional time to examine the evidence and challenge its accuracy and reliability. However, the judge denied the request for a postponement and later allowed Rawson to use the videotape during his testimony in court.

Krone also testified in his own defense, denied committing the murder, and stated that he had been asleep at home when Ancona was killed.

On August 7, 1992, the jury convicted Krone of first-degree murder and kidnapping but acquitted him of sexual assault.

On November 20, 1992, he was sentenced to death following his murder conviction.

The dental evidence, which had been disputed because of concerns about its accuracy and reliability, later became one of the central issues in Krone’s appeal before the Arizona Supreme Court. The court subsequently overturned his conviction and ordered a new trial.

== Appeal and second trial (1995–1996) ==
On June 22, 1995, the Arizona Supreme Court overturned Ray Krone's convictions and ordered a new trial. The court determined that the prosecution's late disclosure of the videotape comparing dental impressions with bite marks constituted a significant violation of Arizona's criminal procedure rules. Because the videotape was a central part of the prosecution's evidence, the court concluded that allowing it to be presented without giving the defense sufficient time to prepare and respond was not a minor error that could be disregarded without affecting the fairness of the trial.

The court also examined whether the defense team had been given a fair opportunity to review and challenge the forensic evidence presented by the prosecution. Although Krone's attorney knew that the prosecution intended to present expert testimony concerning bite marks, the videotape itself was not disclosed until shortly before the trial began. The Supreme Court determined that it was unfair to deny the defense's request for sufficient time to examine and respond to evidence of such importance, particularly during a critical proceeding such as a criminal trial that could result in a death sentence.

Krone's second trial began in February 1996. During the proceedings, forensic odontologist Raymond Rawson again testified for the prosecution and presented the videotape comparing dental impressions with bite marks. In response, the defense presented expert testimony challenging the prosecution's interpretation of the bite-mark evidence. Despite these challenges, on April 11, 1996, the jury convicted Krone again of first-degree murder and kidnapping.

Following his second conviction, Krone was sentenced to life imprisonment rather than death. He remained incarcerated and continued to maintain his innocence. The disputed forensic evidence remained one of the central issues in the case until subsequent DNA testing revealed new information concerning the identity of the actual perpetrator.

== DNA testing and exoneration (2001–2002) ==
In 2001, Ray Krone’s defense attorneys, Alan Simpson and Chris Plourd, filed a petition requesting DNA testing of biological evidence that had been preserved since the original investigation. The request was approved, and DNA testing was conducted in March 2002 on saliva and blood samples collected from the victim’s body. The results showed that Krone was not the source of the biological material. Instead, the evidence linked another individual, Kenneth Phillips Jr., who was already serving a prison sentence for an unrelated sexual offense, to the crime.

The investigation also included a reexamination of fingerprint evidence collected from the crime scene at the time. A fingerprint examiner determined that Phillips’s right middle fingerprint matched a latent fingerprint found on the interior side of the bar’s front door. In addition, a palmprint discovered on the bottom of a condom vending machine in the men’s restroom, where Ancona’s body had been found, was also matched to Phillips. These findings provided significant additional physical evidence connecting Phillips to the crime scene.

Phillips had been living near the establishment at the time of Ancona’s murder but had not previously been identified as a suspect. Furthermore, the DNA and fingerprint results contradicted the evidence used to identify Krone through bite-mark comparisons during his two trials.

On April 8, 2002, Krone’s convictions were overturned, and he was released from prison after spending more than ten years incarcerated. On April 24, 2002, prosecutors formally dismissed the charges against him. Phillips was subsequently charged in connection with Ancona’s murder. In 2006, Phillips pleaded guilty to the murder and was sentenced to 53 years in prison.

Krone’s release attracted widespread attention because he became the 100th person to be exonerated from death row since the reinstatement of capital punishment in the United States in 1976. His case has also become a subject of discussion in research examining the reliability of bite-mark comparisons as evidence for identifying suspects in criminal proceedings.

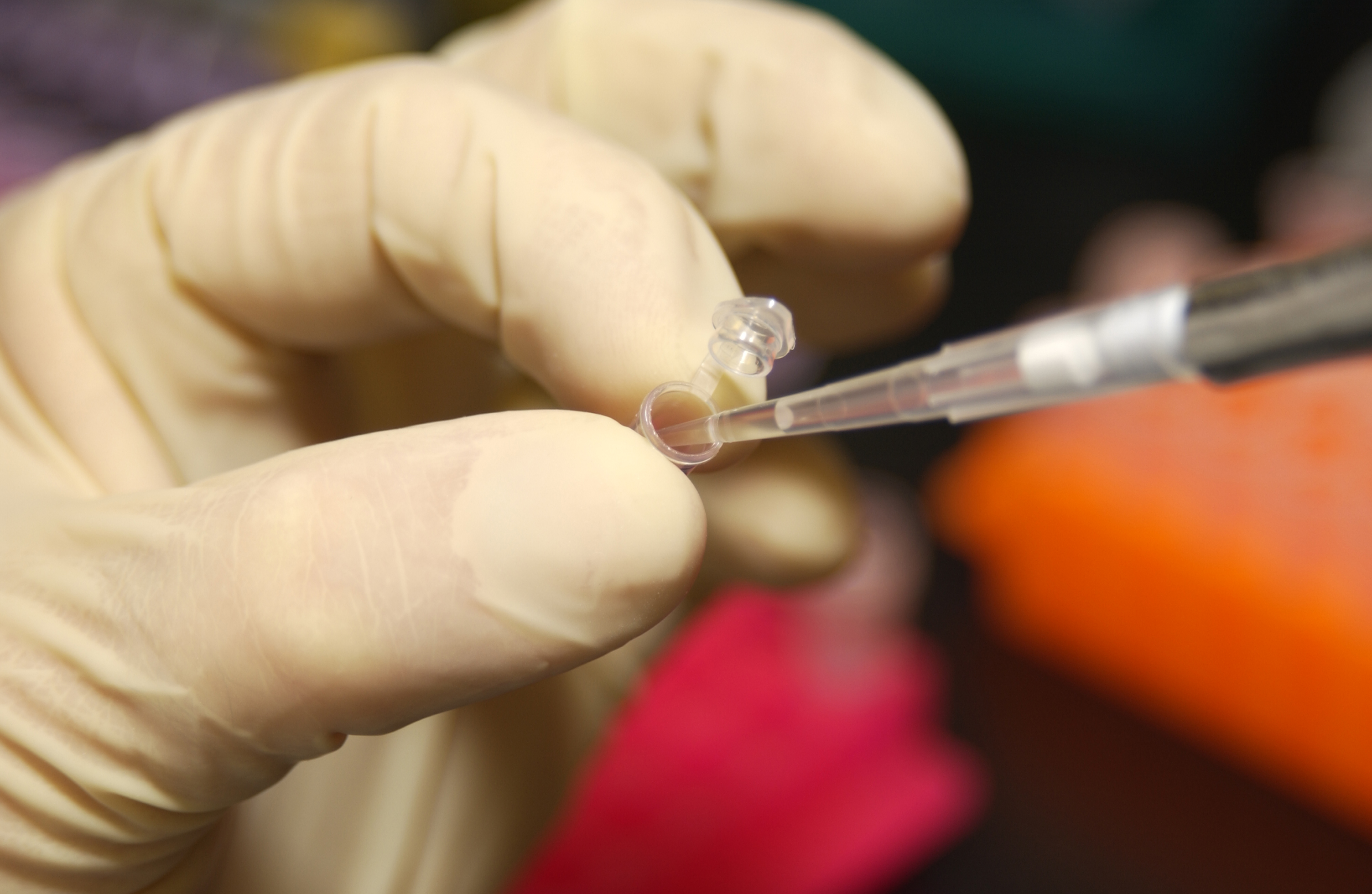
DNA testing played a key role in Ray Krone's exoneration in 2002. This photograph shows a researcher handling a DNA sample.

== See also ==
- List of exonerated death row inmates
- List of wrongful convictions in the United States
