= John Kuhn =

American football player (born 1982)

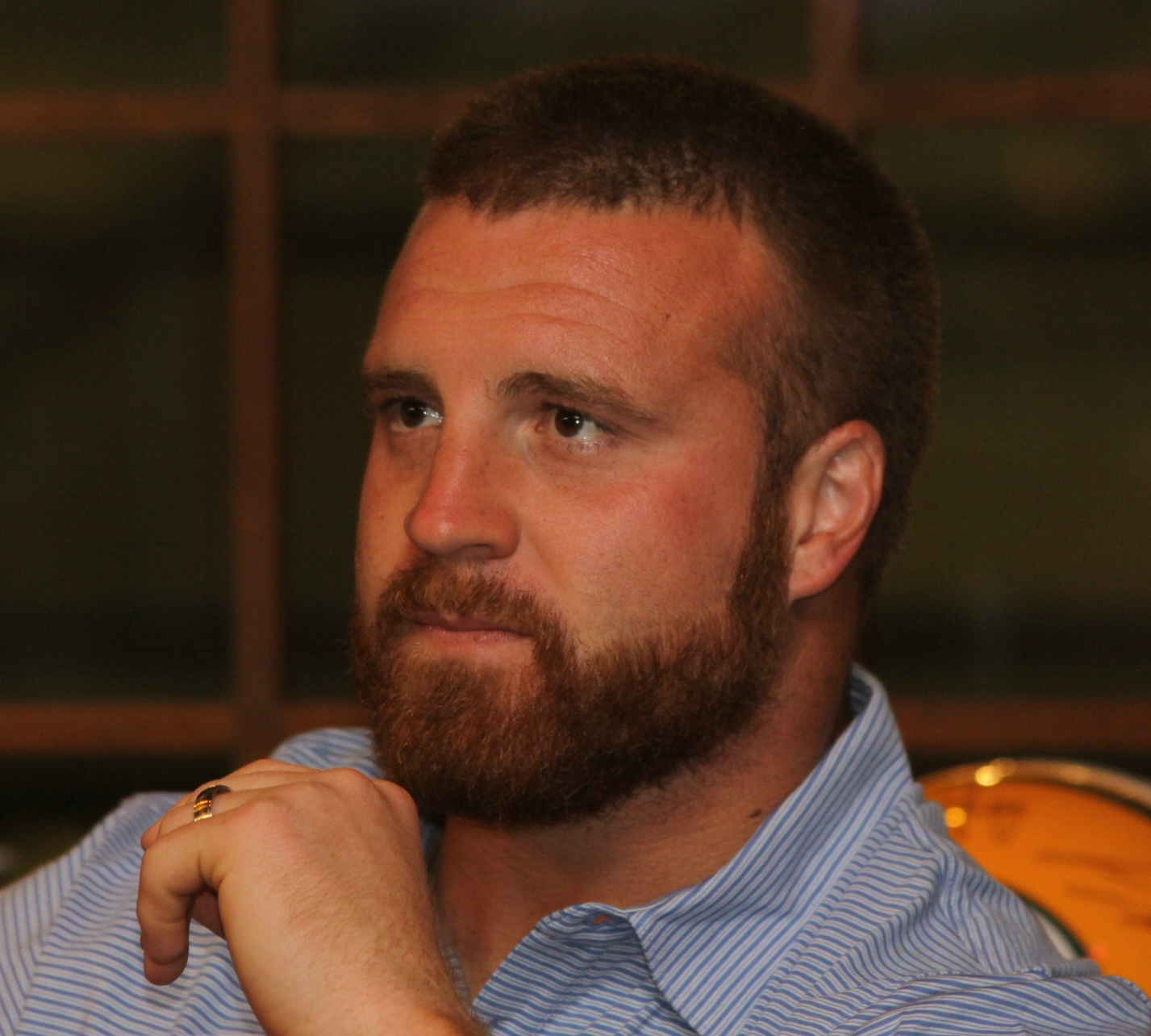
- Kuhn in 2013

No. 42, 30, 29
- Position: Fullback

Personal information
- Born: September 9, 1982 (age 44); York, Pennsylvania, U.S.
- Listed height: 6 ft 0 in (1.83 m)
- Listed weight: 250 lb (113 kg)

Career information
- High school: Dover (PA)
- College: Shippensburg (2001–2004)
- NFL draft: 2005: undrafted

Career history
- Pittsburgh Steelers (2005–2006); Green Bay Packers (2007–2015); New Orleans Saints (2016–2017)

Awards and highlights
- 2× Super Bowl champion (XL, XLV); First-team All-Pro (2014); Second-team All-Pro (2011); 3× Pro Bowl (2011, 2014, 2015)

Career NFL statistics
- Rushing attempts: 217
- Rushing yards: 658
- Rushing touchdowns: 19
- Receptions: 98
- Receiving yards: 642
- Receiving touchdowns: 9
- Stats at Pro Football Reference

John Allen Kuhn (born September 9, 1982) is an American former professional football player who was a fullback in the National Football League (NFL). After playing college football for Shippensburg University, he was signed by the Pittsburgh Steelers as an undrafted free agent in 2005. Kuhn earned a Super Bowl ring in his first year with the Steelers in Super Bowl XL, and another as a member of the Green Bay Packers, five years later in Super Bowl XLV. He was named to three Pro Bowls, all as a Packer.

== Early life ==
Kuhn is the son of John Kuhn and Patti Duffy. He was a four-sport athlete at Dover Area High School in York County, Pennsylvania, playing football, basketball, baseball and track. In football, he played both offense and defense for the Eagles, rushing for 2,242 yards and 20 touchdowns while also playing inside linebacker. He was the first Dover player to rush for over 1,000 yards in back-to-back seasons. Kuhn did not receive any Division I scholarship offers to play college football.

== College career ==
A Northeast Region finalist for the Harlon Hill Trophy given to the top player in NCAA Division II as a senior, Kuhn was selected to play in the 2005 Whataburger Cactus Bowl on January 7 as a Division II all-star for the North team. He was named PSAC Western Division Offensive Player of the Year in 2003 and was a three-time First-team All-Pennsylvania State Athletic Conference (PSAC) Western Division selection.

In 2004, the Raiders won their first PSAC Western Division Championship since 1988 and advanced to the NCAA Division II national football championship second round with a 10–2 record, marking the team's first 10-win regular season since 1981.

Kuhn holds 27 school records and six PSAC records. He finished his career with 4,685 yards rushing, 910 carries, 53 touchdowns, 5,300 all-purpose yards and 26 games with at least 100 yards rushing, all school records. Kuhn led the team in rushing for the third-straight season as a senior and is the only player in team history to total over 1,000 yards rushing in three-straight seasons.

A standout in the classroom, Kuhn was a First-team ESPN The Magazine/College Sports Information Directors of America (CoSIDA) Academic All-America in both 2003 and 2004 and was named First-team Academic All-District II three-straight years. He was also chosen as a PSAC Fall Top Ten Award winner as both a junior and senior, the first Shippensburg male student-athlete to have received the award twice.

Kuhn ranked 17th in Division II in rushing yards per game and was 34th in all-purpose yards. He was chosen as a First-team American Football Coaches Association (AFCA) All-American and Third-team Associated Press (AP) Little All-American.

Kuhn graduated with a chemistry degree in December 2004. During the summer of 2003, he had worked as a lab technician for the Pennsylvania Department of Environmental Protection, and during the summer of 2004 he worked for Johnson & Johnson.

In 2013, he was inducted into the Shippensburg University athletic hall of fame by his long time friend, roommate, and 3rd string safety Kevin Boyle.

== Professional career ==
=== Pittsburgh Steelers ===
==== 2005 ====
He was signed by the Pittsburgh Steelers as an undrafted free agent on April 29, 2005. He was released prior to the season, but on November 30 was assigned to the team's practice squad for the final five games.

==== 2006 ====
Kuhn won a Super Bowl ring on February 5, 2006, as a member of the Steelers in Super Bowl XL with their 21–10 win over the Seattle Seahawks.

After spending the first eight weeks of the 2006 season on the Steelers' practice squad, Kuhn was signed to the Steelers active roster on October 31, 2006. During the 2006 season he appeared in nine games, with two carries for 18 yards, including a 16-yard run on his first NFL carry versus the Cleveland Browns. He added a two-yarder against the Carolina Panthers. He also caught one pass for 15 yards, also against Carolina, and had seven special teams tackles for the season.

On October 6, 2006, he was selected in the 8th round of the Arena Football League's Expansion Draft by the New Orleans VooDoo. His rights had been owned by the San Jose SaberCats, although he never played for them or in the Arena League.

=== Green Bay Packers ===
==== 2007 ====
In 2007, Kuhn was signed to the active roster of the Green Bay Packers on September 2, a day after being released by the Steelers. He joined Rob Davis as Shippensburg University graduates on the Packers roster. Davis has subsequently retired and joined the Packers front office staff. Kuhn played in all 16 games for the Packers, primarily on special teams and as a blocking fullback, starting one game, on December 30 versus the Detroit Lions. He had no carries for the year, with two passes caught for seven yards. However, he recorded 11 special teams tackles.

The Packers re-signed Kuhn, who was an exclusive rights free agent, on March 19, 2008.

==== 2008 ====
In 2008, he again played in all 16 games, including three starts. For the season, he ran eight times for 10 yards and caught four passes for 21 yards and scored his first two NFL touchdowns. The first was on October 12 on a one-yard pass from Aaron Rodgers to put the Packers up 24–10 on the Seahawks. He scored his first rushing touchdown on a one-yard run on November 24 against the New Orleans Saints to put the Packers up 7–0. Also for the season, he recorded 12 special teams tackles.

==== 2009 ====
In 2009, Kuhn played in 14 games, including six starts, rushing eight times for 18 yards with seven receptions for 47 yards, and he scored three touchdowns. Two came in one game on September 27 against the St. Louis Rams, with a 1-yard TD run and a 10-yard pass from Rodgers. He recorded 11 special teams tackles.

==== 2010 ====
In 2010, Kuhn played in all 16 games again, with two starts, and put up his most productive season to date. Kuhn was selected to his first Pro Bowl, while he rushed 84 times for 281 yards and four touchdowns and had 15 receptions for 97 yards for another two touchdowns. He recorded seven special teams tackles.

He also appeared in all four Packers postseason games with one start, with a total of six rushes for eight yards and one touchdown and six receptions for 53 yards and one touchdown. He also became the first Packer to have both a rushing and a receiving touchdown in one playoff game since James Lofton in 1983.

==== 2011 ====
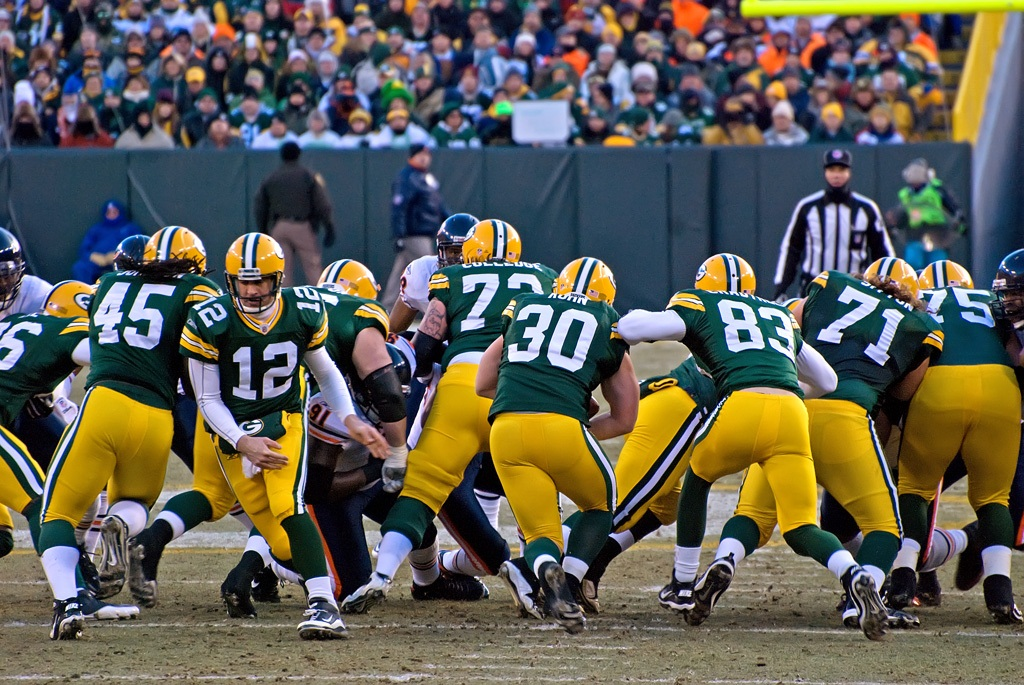
Kuhn (30) receiving a hand off from Aaron Rodgers on January 2, 2011.

In 2011, he appeared in all 16 games for the fourth time in five seasons, with three starts. He was named a starting fullback for the Pro Bowl and was named second-team All-Pro by the Associated Press. He rushed 30 times for 78 yards with 15 receptions for 77 yards, and matched his career high with six total touchdowns. In the Packers NFC Divisional game versus the New York Giants, he scored the Packers' first touchdown with an eight-yard catch from Rodgers. He left the game in the third quarter with a knee injury.

==== 2012 ====
In 2012, Kuhn played 14 games (missing two games with a hamstring injury) with three starts, rushing 23 times for 63 yards and tying his career high with 15 receptions for a career-high 148 yards while adding three special teams tackles.

In the NFC Wild Card game versus the Minnesota Vikings, he scored touchdowns on consecutive possessions, one via the ground and one on a pass. He was named a Pro Bowl alternate.

==== 2013 ====
In 2013, Kuhn played in 15 games with six starts. He rushed 10 times for 38 yards with one touchdown and caught 13 passes for 81 yards. He gained national recognition in the season's finale versus the Chicago Bears to decide the NFC North championship and a berth in the playoffs. With the Packers trailing 28–27, facing a fourth-and-8 from the Bears 48 yard line, it appeared that Bears defensive end Julius Peppers would sack Packers quarterback Aaron Rodgers. However, Kuhn quickly shifted across the formation and made a cut block on Peppers, allowing Rodgers to escape and throw a game-winning touchdown pass to Randall Cobb.

During the January 5 wild card game against the San Francisco 49ers, Kuhn had a one-yard run touchdown run in the fourth quarter to give the Packers a 17–13 lead. However, the 49ers eventually won the game, 23–20. This marked the 5th consecutive postseason in which Kuhn has scored either a passing or rushing TD.

==== 2014 ====
Kuhn became a free agent after the 2013 season; however, on April 3, 2014, he signed a one-year contract with the Packers. In the regular season, he played in all 16 games with 24 carries for 85 yards and one touchdown, plus four receptions for 23 yards. He was named 2014 first-team All-Pro fullback by the Associated Press.

==== 2015 ====
On April 13, 2015, Kuhn re-signed with the Packers on a one-year deal.

=== New Orleans Saints ===
On August 5, 2016, Kuhn was signed by the New Orleans Saints. During a Week 3 loss, Kuhn scored his first touchdown as a Saint on a 3-yard rush against the Atlanta Falcons. On October 2, he scored two rushing touchdowns and added his first receiving touchdown as a Saint in a 35–34 comeback win over the San Diego Chargers.

On February 3, 2017, Kuhn re-signed with the Saints on a one-year contract. On September 3, Kuhn was released by the Saints, but was re-signed three days later. He was again released on September 21, but was re-signed four days later. On September 28, Kuhn was placed on injured reserve after tearing his biceps in practice.

=== Retirement ===
On March 6, 2019, Packers general manager Brian Gutekunst announced that Kuhn had informed the team of his decision to retire, and his wish to do so as a Packer. The team signed him to a one-day contract and Kuhn filed for retirement.

== NFL career statistics ==
=== Regular season ===
Year	Team	Games		Rushing					Receiving				
Year	Team	GP	GS	Att	Yds	Avg	Lng	TD	Rec	Yds	Avg	Lng	TD
2006	PIT	9	0	2	18	9	16	0	1	15	15	15	0
2007	GB	16	1	0	0	0	0	0	2	7	3.5	5	0
2008	GB	16	3	8	10	1.3	3	1	4	21	5.3	13	2
2009	GB	14	6	8	18	2.3	5	1	7	47	6.7	14	2
2010	GB	16	2	84	281	3.3	18	4	15	97	6.5	12	2
2011	GB	16	3	30	78	2.6	12	4	15	77	5.1	11	2
2012	GB	14	3	23	63	2.7	9	1	15	148	9.9	32	0
2013	GB	15	6	10	38	3.8	12	1	13	81	6.2	20	0
2014	GB	16	2	24	85	3.5	11	1	4	23	5.8	9	0
2015	GB	16	6	9	28	3.1	5	2	6	56	9.3	19	0
2016	NO	15	3	18	37	2.1	4	4	16	70	4.4	11	1
2017	NO	2	1	1	2	2.0	2	0	0	0	0.0	0	0
Total		165	36	217	658	3.0	18	19	98	642	6.3	32	9

=== Postseason ===
Year	Team	Games		Rushing					Receiving				
Year	Team	GP	GS	Att	Yds	Avg	Lng	TD	Rec	Yds	Avg	Lng	TD
2007	GB	2	1	0	0	0	0	0	0	0	.0	0	0
2009	GB	1	0	1	1	1.0	1	1	1	−3	−3	−3	0
2010	GB	4	1	6	8	1.3	4	1	6	53	8.8	16	1
2011	GB	1	0	1	2	2.0	2	0	1	8	8.0	8	1
2012	GB	2	0	3	4	1.3	3	1	2	15	7.5	9	1
2013	GB	1	0	2	2	1.0	1	1	2	16	8.0	8	0
2014	GB	2	2	3	7	2.3	4	0	2	10	5.0	7	0
2015	GB	2	1	3	4	1.3	2	0	3	16	5.3	6	0
Total		15	5	19	28	1.5	4	4	17	115	6.8	16	3

== Personal life ==
Kuhn's wife, Lindsey (Incorvati), is a former soccer player and sprinter on the track team at Shippensburg University. They live in Wisconsin together.

Kuhn is active in Packers charitable events and is a two-time participant in the NFL's Business Management and Entrepreneur Program at the Harvard Business School and the Wharton School of Business.

Kuhn became a fan favorite in Green Bay. Whenever Kuhn carried the ball, Packers' fans called out his surname "Kuuuuuuuuuuhhhhhhhhhhn," which was sometimes mistaken for booing. This continued during his time as a New Orleans Saint. The chant originated at Shippensburg each time he touched the ball, but Kuhn gained national fame after scoring three touchdowns in week 16 of 2010 against the New York Giants. The Packers won, 45–17.

In 2013, he co-starred in a national Campbell's Soup commercial with teammate Clay Matthews, with both in full Packers uniforms.

In 2019, Kuhn joined the Packers TV Network as a commentator.

He now is heard statewide, on Wisconsin Sports radio and home of the Green Bay Packers, and Wisconsin Badgers, WRNW 97.3 FM “The Game,” in Milwaukee as well as WTSO 1070AM in Madison, and WNFL 1440 in Green Bay, Wisconsin. Hit segment: “Kuhn’s Can’t Miss,” on Nine 2 Noon.
