= List of suspensions in the NFL =

The following is a list of suspensions in the National Football League (NFL). Most NFL suspensions have been for players, but several coaches, owners, general managers, and game officials have also been suspended.

In 1997, in the wake of the O. J. Simpson murder trial, the league under Commissioner Paul Tagliabue adopted a Violent Crime Policy which gave the league broad powers to fine and suspend players for violent crimes following a conviction. In 2000, the league revised its Violent Crime Policy to allow the league to suspend for non-violent crimes and other off-the-field actions. This was the Personal Conduct Policy.

After Roger Goodell became commissioner in 2006, the league began cracking down on players performing violent hits, as well as handing out more frequent suspensions for violating the league's personal conduct and substance abuse policies. In March 2007, Goodell introduced a revised Personal Conduct Policy which strengthened the existing conduct rules. Following the 2011 NFL season, Goodell handed down one of the most severe suspensions in league history when he suspended eight players and coaches for their involvement in the New Orleans Saints bounty scandal.

== Player suspensions ==
Date suspended	Suspension length	Name	Position	Team at the time of suspension	Reason	Reference
December 17, 1925	Life (reinstated in 1926)	Art Folz	QB	Chicago Cardinals	Involvement in the 1925 Chicago Cardinals–Milwaukee Badgers scandal	
April 3, 1947	Life (Note: Filchock was reinstated in 1950; Hapes was reinstated in 1954.)	Frank Filchock	QB (Note: Filchock also played as a running back.)	New York Giants	Fixing the 1946 NFL Championship Game	
April 3, 1947	Life	Merle Hapes	RB	New York Giants	Fixing the 1946 NFL Championship Game	
November 22, 1947	1 game	Jack Matheson	OE	Chicago Bears	Conduct detrimental to the league	
April 17, 1963	Entire 1963 season	Alex Karras	DT	Detroit Lions	Betting on NFL games	
April 17, 1963	Entire 1963 season	Paul Hornung	HB (Note: Hornung also played as a safety and placekicker.)	Green Bay Packers	Betting on NFL games	
July 27, 1982	3 games	Roger Carr (Note: Team suspension)	WR	Baltimore Colts	Conduct detrimental to the team	
May 20, 1983	Indefinite (reinstated in June 1984)	Art Schlichter	QB	Baltimore Colts	Betting on NFL games and other sporting events	
August 2, 1983	Entire 1983 season	Mike Reilly	LB	Los Angeles Rams	Being convicted of vehicular manslaughter	
October 9, 1986	1 game	Greg Townsend	DE	Los Angeles Raiders	Unsportsmanlike conduct, stemming from his participation in a brawl versus the Kansas City Chiefs on October 5, 1986	
November 24, 1986	2 games	Charles Martin	DE	Green Bay Packers	Body-slamming Chicago Bears quarterback Jim McMahon	
August 30, 1990	6 games	Eric Dickerson	RB	Indianapolis Colts	Conduct detrimental to the team	
November 8, 1991	4 games	Eric Dickerson	RB	Indianapolis Colts	Conduct detrimental to the team	
November 16, 1994	1 game	Andre Rison	WR	Atlanta Falcons	Showing up late to multiple team meetings	
September 23, 1996	Entire 1996 season	Jeff George	QB	Atlanta Falcons	Violation of the league's personal conduct policy, stemming from an argument during a game with Falcons head coach June Jones	
November 17, 1998	1 game	Derrick Thomas	OLB	Kansas City Chiefs	Unsportsmanlike conduct, stemming from multiple personal fouls in a loss against the Denver Broncos	
December 17, 1999	Indefinite	Rae Carruth	WR	Free agent	Violation of the league's Violent Crime Policy, stemming from murder charge	
March 14, 2000	1 game	Jumbo Elliott	OT	New York Jets	Violation of the league's Violent Crime Policy	
March 14, 2000	1 game	Matt O'Dwyer	G	Cincinnati Bengals	Violation of the league's Violent Crime Policy	
March 14, 2000	1 game	Denard Walker	CB	Tennessee Titans	Violation of the league's Violent Crime Policy	
August 24, 2000	1 game	Mario Bates	RB	Arizona Cardinals	Violation of the Personal Conduct Policy	
September 20, 2000	2 games	Mustafah Muhammad	DB	Indianapolis Colts	Violation of the Personal Conduct Policy	
July 26, 2001	1 game	Michael Pittman	RB	Arizona Cardinals	Violation of the Personal Conduct Policy	
August 16, 2001	Entire 2001 season	Terry Glenn	WR	New England Patriots	Violation of team rules, stemming from his failure to report to training camp	
October 9, 2001	1 game	Leon Searcy	OT	Baltimore Ravens	Violation of the Personal Conduct Policy	
November 22, 2001	1 game	Gerard Warren	DT	Cleveland Browns	Conduct detrimental to the team	
November 22, 2001	1 game	Mike Sellers	FB	Cleveland Browns	Conduct detrimental to the team	
November 22, 2001	1 game	Lamar Chapman	CB	Cleveland Browns	Conduct detrimental to the team	
December 11, 2001	4 games	R. Jay Soward	WR	Jacksonville Jaguars	Violating team rules	
December 17, 2001	4 games	Albert Connell	WR	New Orleans Saints	Conduct detrimental to the team (stealing from teammate Deuce McAllister)	
March 19, 2002	1 game	Victor Riley	LT	Free agent	Violation of the Personal Conduct Policy	
September 1, 2002	4 games	Ron Warner	DE	Tampa Bay Buccaneers	Undisclosed	
October 24, 2002	1 game	Rodney Harrison	S	San Diego Chargers	Helmet-to-helmet collision on Oakland Raiders wide receiver Jerry Rice	
November 21, 2002	1 game	Steve Smith	WR	Carolina Panthers	Violation of the Personal Conduct Policy, stemming from fighting teammate Anthony Bright during practice	
August 29, 2003	1 game	Derrick Rodgers	LB	New Orleans Saints	Violation of the Personal Conduct Policy	
June 22, 2004	3 games	Michael Pittman	RB	Tampa Bay Buccaneers	Violation of the Personal Conduct Policy, stemming from a domestic violence incident	
September 6, 2004	1 game	Leonardo Carson	DT	Dallas Cowboys	Violation of the Personal Conduct Policy, stemming from being convicted of burglary and kidnapping	
October 18, 2004	1 game	Dwayne Carswell	TE	Denver Broncos	Violation of the Personal Conduct Policy, stemming from a domestic violence incident	
June 15, 2005	2 games	Mike Doss	S	Indianapolis Colts	Violation of the Personal Conduct Policy, stemming from alleged possession of firearms	
August 20, 2005	1 game	Brad Hopkins	OL	Tennessee Titans	Violation of the Personal Conduct Policy, stemming from a domestic violence incident	
December 15, 2005	1 game	Wayne Hunter	OL	Seattle Seahawks	Violation of the Personal Conduct Policy	
October 2, 2006	5 games	Albert Haynesworth	DT	Tennessee Titans	Stomping on Dallas Cowboys center Andre Gurode	
October 6, 2006	2 games	Chris Henry	WR	Cincinnati Bengals	Alleged possessions of firearms	
November 22, 2006	1 game	Ricky Manning	CB	Chicago Bears	Violation of the Personal Conduct Policy, stemming from a domestic violence incident	
May 15, 2007	Entire 2007 season	Adam Jones	CB	Tennessee Titans	Attacking a stripper and threatening a security guard's life	
May 15, 2007	8 games	Chris Henry	WR	Cincinnati Bengals	Violation of the Personal Conduct Policy	
June 4, 2007	8 games	Tank Johnson	DT	Chicago Bears	Alleged possession of six firearms and violation of probation on other charges	
July 13, 2007	2 games	Sam Brandon	S	Denver Broncos	Violation of the Personal Conduct Policy	
July 18, 2007	2 games	Jared Allen	DE	Kansas City Chiefs	Violation of the Personal Conduct Policy, stemming from two DUI arrests	
July 27, 2007	Indefinite (reinstated in July 2009)	Michael Vick	QB	Atlanta Falcons	Involvement in the Bad Newz Kennels dog fighting scandal	
July 27, 2007	2 games	Jeremy Bridges	OG	Carolina Panthers	Misdemeanor assault charges	
November 5, 2007	2 games	Justin Durant	LB	Jacksonville Jaguars	Violation of team rules, stemming from an arrest	
November 5, 2007	2 games	Richard Collier	OT	Jacksonville Jaguars	Violation of team rules, stemming from an arrest	
July 14, 2008	3 games	Darrion Scott	DE	Free agent	Violation of the Personal Conduct Policy, stemming from child endangerment charges	
August 1, 2008	1 game	Fabian Washington	CB	Baltimore Ravens	Violation of the Personal Conduct Policy	
August 2, 2008	2 games	Steve Smith	WR	Carolina Panthers	Violation of the Personal Conduct Policy, stemming from fighting teammate Ken Lucas during training camp	
August 5, 2008	3 games (later reduced to 1 game)	Brandon Marshall	WR	Denver Broncos	Violation of the Personal Conduct Policy, stemming from various off the field incidents	
August 30, 2008	4 games	Bryant McKinnie	OT	Minnesota Vikings	Violation of the Personal Conduct Policy	
September 28, 2008	1 game	Eric Smith	DT	New York Jets	Helmet-to-helmet collision against Arizona Cardinals wide receiver Anquan Boldin	
October 3, 2008	1 game	Tommie Harris	DT	Chicago Bears	Violation of team rules	
October 14, 2008	4 games	Adam Jones	CB	Dallas Cowboys	Involvement in an altercation with a bodyguard	
November 2, 2008	1 game	Larry Johnson	RB	Kansas City Chiefs	Violation of the Personal Conduct Policy	
November 18, 2008	1 game	Kellen Winslow II	TE	Cleveland Browns	Conduct detrimental to the team	
December 8, 2008	4 games	Plaxico Burress	WR	New York Giants	Accidental shooting with a firearm	
April 9, 2009	3 games	Marshawn Lynch	RB	Buffalo Bills	Violation of the Personal Conduct Policy	
July 7, 2009	1 game	Michael Boley	LB	New York Giants	Violation of the Personal Conduct Policy	
August 13, 2009	Entire 2009 season	Donté Stallworth	WR	Cleveland Browns	Crashed into and killed a pedestrian while DUI	
September 23, 2009	Until release from prison in 2011	Plaxico Burress	WR	Free agent	Aforementioned accidental shooting	
October 19, 2009	1 game	Dante Wesley	CB	Carolina Panthers	Launching himself against Tampa Bay Buccaneer punt returner Clifton Smith	
October 29, 2009	1 game	Larry Johnson	RB	Kansas City Chiefs	Conduct detrimental to the team, stemming from using gay slurs on Twitter	
April 21, 2010	6 games (later reduced to 4 games)	Ben Roethlisberger	QB	Pittsburgh Steelers	Violation of the Personal Conduct Policy	
June 3, 2010	1 game	Quinn Ojinnaka	OL	Atlanta Falcons	Violation of the Personal Conduct Policy	
July 1, 2010	3 games	Vincent Jackson	WR	San Diego Chargers	Violation of the Personal Conduct Policy	
August 31, 2010	1 game	Aqib Talib	CB	Tampa Bay Buccaneers	Violation of the Personal Conduct Policy	
September 1, 2010	1 game	Maurice Purify	WR	Cincinnati Bengals	Violation of the Personal Conduct Policy	
September 27, 2010	1 game	Tony McDaniel	DT	Miami Dolphins	Violation of the Personal Conduct Policy, stemming from an arrest for battery	
October 20, 2010	1 game	Pat McAfee	P	Indianapolis Colts	Conduct detrimental to the team	
December 7, 2010	4 games	Albert Haynesworth	DT	Washington Redskins	Conduct detrimental to the team	
January 3, 2011	1 game	Brandon Deaderick	NT	New England Patriots	Violation of team rules	
August 18, 2011	5 games	Terrelle Pryor	QB	Oakland Raiders	Involvement in receiving improper benefits while at Ohio State	
October 18, 2011	1 game	Cedric Benson	HB	Cincinnati Bengals	Misdemeanor assault	
September 22, 2011	2 games	Brandon Underwood	CB	Free agent	Violation of the Personal Conduct Policy	
October 25, 2011	Entire 2011 season	Chris Cook	CB	Minnesota Vikings	Domestic assault charges	
November 29, 2011	2 games	Ndamukong Suh	DT	Detroit Lions	Stomping of Green Bay Packers lineman Evan Dietrich-Smith	
December 13, 2011	1 game	James Harrison	LB	Pittsburgh Steelers	Violent tackle on Cleveland Browns quarterback Colt McCoy	
May 2, 2012	Entire 2012 season (later overturned)	Jonathan Vilma	LB	New Orleans Saints	Involvement in the New Orleans Saints bounty program	
May 2, 2012	8 games (later overturned)	Anthony Hargrove	DE	Green Bay Packers	Involvement in the New Orleans Saints bounty program	
May 2, 2012	4 games (later overturned)	Will Smith	DE	New Orleans Saints	Involvement in the New Orleans Saints bounty program	
May 2, 2012	3 games (later overturned)	Scott Fujita	LB	Cleveland Browns	Involvement in the New Orleans Saints bounty program	
August 20, 2012	3 games	Aaron Berry	CB	Free agent	Two arrests during the 2012 offseason	
August 30, 2012	1 game	Kenny Britt	WR	Tennessee Titans	Various incidents involving police	
September 25, 2012	1 game	Joe Mays	LB	Denver Broncos	Illegal hit on Houston Texans quarterback Matt Schaub	
October 16, 2012	2 games	Alameda Ta'amu	NT	Pittsburgh Steelers	Off-field arrest	
October 22, 2012	3 games	Donald Washington	CB	Free agent	Violation of league rules while with the Kansas City Chiefs	
December 10, 2012	3 games	Brandon Jacobs	RB	San Francisco 49ers	Violation of the team's social media policy	
December 11, 2012	1 game	Rashard Mendenhall	RB	Pittsburgh Steelers	Conduct detrimental to the team	
August 20, 2013	1 game	Antonio Smith	DE	Houston Texans	Removing and swinging Miami Dolphins guard Richie Incognito's helmet	
November 24, 2012	2 games	Jabar Gaffney	WR	Free agent	Failure to report an arrest from 2010 to the league	
September 16, 2013	1 game (later overturned)	Dashon Goldson	FS	Tampa Bay Buccaneers	Helmet-to-helmet hit on New Orleans Saints running back Darren Sproles	
October 21, 2013	2 games (later reduced to one game)	Brandon Meriweather	FS	Washington Redskins	Repeated violations of the league's helmet-to-helmet policy	
November 4, 2013	Indefinite (reinstated Feb. 2014)	Richie Incognito	OG	Miami Dolphins	Detrimental conduct	
November 18, 2013	1 game	Erik Walden	LB	Indianapolis Colts	Headbutting Tennessee Titans tight end Delanie Walker	
November 18, 2013	1 game	Dashon Goldson	FS	Tampa Bay Buccaneers	Repeated violations of the league's player safety policy	
November 25, 2013	1 game	Michael Griffin	FS	Tennessee Titans	Repeated violations of the league's player safety policy	
May 11, 2014	Indefinite (reinstated one week later)	Don Jones	SS	Miami Dolphins	Violations of the team's social media policy	
August 5, 2014	Indefinite (reinstated five days later)	Martellus Bennett	TE	Chicago Bears	Conduct detrimental to the team, after an altercation with rookie CB Kyle Fuller in practice	
August 25, 2014	2 games	Brandon Meriweather	SS	Washington Redskins	Illegal hit on Baltimore Ravens WR Torrey Smith	
August 26, 2014	Indefinite	Dimitri Patterson	CB	New York Jets	Unexplained absence from the team's training camp	
September 2, 2014	10 games	Josh Brent	NT	Dallas Cowboys	Violation of the Personal Conduct Policy, stemming from being convicted of manslaughter	
September 8, 2014	Indefinite (Note: Originally suspended for 2 games on July 24, 2014, changed to indefinite following a release of the video of the incident in September) (appealed and overturned two months later)	Ray Rice	RB	Baltimore Ravens	Violation of the Personal Conduct Policy, stemming from a domestic violence incident	
October 6, 2014	Indefinite (reinstated one week later)	Derrick Shelby	DE	Miami Dolphins	Conduct detrimental to the team	
October 25, 2014	2 games	C. J. Mosley	DT	Detroit Lions	Conduct detrimental to the team and violations of team rules	
October 28, 2014	2 games	Joe Morgan	WR	New Orleans Saints	Undisclosed	
November 18, 2014	Indefinite (reinstated in Feb. 2015)	Adrian Peterson	RB	Minnesota Vikings	Violation of the Personal Conduct Policy	
November 23, 2014	1 game	David Amerson	CB	Washington Redskins	Violation of team rules	
December 22, 2014	1 game	Dominic Raiola	C	Detroit Lions	Stomping on the leg of Chicago Bears defensive tackle Ego Ferguson	
December 27, 2014	1 game	Josh Gordon	WR	Cleveland Browns	Violation of team rules	
December 29, 2014	1 game (later appealed and reduced to a $70,000 fine)	Ndamukong Suh	DT	Detroit Lions	Stepping on the leg of Green Bay Packers quarterback Aaron Rodgers	
January 23, 2015	2 games	Trent Richardson	RB	Indianapolis Colts	Undisclosed	
April 22, 2015	10 games (later reduced to 4 games)	Greg Hardy	DE	Dallas Cowboys	Violation of the Personal Conduct Policy, stemming from a domestic abuse charge	
May 11, 2015	4 games	Tom Brady	QB	New England Patriots	Involvement in the Deflategate scandal	
July 31, 2015	1 game	Orson Charles	TE	New Orleans Saints	Violation of the Personal Conduct Policy	
September 3, 2015	1 game	T. J. Ward	SS	Denver Broncos	Violation of the Personal Conduct Policy	
September 5, 2015	2 games	Zeke Motta	S	Free agent	Undisclosed	
September 8, 2015	4 games	Brandon Spikes	LB	Free agent	Undisclosed	
September 8, 2015	6 games	Mike Williams	WR	Free agent	Undisclosed	
September 8, 2015	3 games	Jonathan Dwyer	RB	Free agent	Violation of the Personal Conduct Policy, stemming from a domestic violence arrest	
September 8, 2015	6 games	Jermaine Cunningham	OLB	Free agent	Violation of the Personal Conduct Policy	
September 8, 2015	6 games	Rodney Austin	OG	Free agent	Violation of the Personal Conduct Policy, stemming from a guilty domestic violence charge	
September 11, 2015	4 games	IK Enemkpali	DE	Buffalo Bills	Punching and breaking the jaw of New York Jets quarterback Geno Smith during an locker room altercation	
September 14, 2015	1 game	Chris Culliver	CB	Washington Redskins	Violation of the Personal Conduct Policy	
October 15, 2015	Indefinite (reinstated four days later)	Derrick Coleman	FB	Seattle Seahawks	Violation of team rules, stemming from an arrest on charges of vehicular assault and hit and run	
October 19, 2015	4 games	Quincy Enunwa	WR	New York Jets	Violation of the Personal Conduct Policy	
November 9, 2015	1 game	Aqib Talib	CB	Denver Broncos	Poking the eye of Indianapolis Colts tight end Dwayne Allen	
November 10, 2015	4 games	Joseph Randle	RB	Free agent	Violation of the Personal Conduct Policy	
November 16, 2015	2 games	Junior Galette	OLB	Washington Redskins	Violation of the Personal Conduct Policy	
December 21, 2015	1 game	Odell Beckham Jr.	WR	New York Giants	Helmet-to-helmet collision on Carolina Panthers cornerback Josh Norman	
January 11, 2016	3 games	Vontaze Burfict	LB	Cincinnati Bengals	Repeated violations of safety-related playing rules	
April 25, 2016	4 games	Tom Brady	QB	New England Patriots	Originally suspended in May 2015 and reinstated in Sep. 2015, but was overruled by the 2nd U.S. Circuit Court of Appeals in April 2016	
June 30, 2016	1 game	Sheldon Richardson	DE	New York Jets	Violation of the Personal Conduct Policy	
August 12, 2016	2 games	Andrew Quarless	TE	Free agent	Violation of the Personal Conduct Policy	
August 16, 2016	2 games	K'Waun Williams	CB	Cleveland Browns	Conduct detrimental to the team	
August 17, 2016	1 game	Josh Brown	K	New York Giants	Violation of the Personal Conduct Policy	
August 29, 2016	2 games	Prince Shembo	LB	Free agent	Violation of the Personal Conduct Policy, stemming from charges of animal cruelty	
September 16, 2016	2 games	Manny Lawson	LB	Free agent	Undisclosed	
October 14, 2016	4 games	Derrick Coleman	FB	Free agent	Violation of the Personal Conduct Policy, stemming from a guilty domestic violence charge	
August 11, 2017	6 games	Ezekiel Elliott	RB	Dallas Cowboys	Violation of the Personal Conduct Policy, stemming from a domestic violence case	
August 23, 2017	1 game	Adam Jones	CB	Cincinnati Bengals	Violation of the Personal Conduct Policy, stemming from a guilty obstruction charge	
August 30, 2017	3 games	Vontaze Burfict	LB	Cincinnati Bengals	Violation of the league's player safety policies, stemming from a hit on Kansas City Chiefs fullback Anthony Sherman	
September 8, 2017	6 games	Josh Brown	K	Free agent	Violation of the Personal Conduct Policy	
September 20, 2017	Indefinite (reinstated a week later)	Lawrence Timmons	LB	Miami Dolphins	Conduct detrimental to the team, stemming from not showing up for team-related events	
September 30, 2017	2 games (later reduced to 1 game)	Danny Trevathan	LB	Chicago Bears	Helmet-to-helmet collision on Green Bay Packers wide receiver Davante Adams	
October 11, 2017	1 game	Dominique Rodgers-Cromartie	CB	New York Giants	Violation of team rules	
October 20, 2017	1 game	Marshawn Lynch	RB	Oakland Raiders	Making contact with a game official	
October 20, 2017	1 game	Andrew Sendejo	S	Minnesota Vikings	Helmet-to-helmet collision on Baltimore Ravens wide receiver Mike Wallace	
October 31, 2017	Indefinite (reinstated a week later)	Janoris Jenkins	CB	New York Giants	Violation of team rules	
November 6, 2017	1 game	Mike Evans	WR	Tampa Bay Buccaneers	Violation of unsportsmanlike conduct and unnecessary roughness rules	
November 27, 2017	2 games (later reduced to 1 game)	Aqib Talib	CB	Denver Broncos	Unsportsmanlike conduct, stemming from a fight during a game that got both players ejected	
November 27, 2017	2 games (later reduced to 1 game)	Michael Crabtree	WR	Oakland Raiders	Unsportsmanlike conduct, stemming from a fight during a game that got both players ejected	
December 4, 2017	1 game	Rob Gronkowski	TE	New England Patriots	Intentionally falling on the neck of Buffalo Bills cornerback Tre'Davious White while he was on the ground	
December 5, 2017	1 game	JuJu Smith-Schuster	WR	Pittsburgh Steelers	Violations of safety-related playing rules	
December 5, 2017	1 game	George Iloka	FS	Cincinnati Bengals	Violations of safety-related playing rules	
December 6, 2017	1 game	Marcus Peters	CB	Kansas City Chiefs	Leaving the field of play before the game had ended	
December 18, 2017	2 games	Thomas Davis Sr.	LB	Carolina Panthers	Illegal hit on Green Bay Packers wide receiver Davante Adams	
December 28, 2017	1 game	Eli Apple	CB	New York Giants	Conduct detrimental to the team	
June 15, 2018	6 games	Roy Miller	DT	Free agent	Undisclosed	
June 28, 2018	3 games	Jameis Winston	QB	Tampa Bay Buccaneers	Violation of the Personal Conduct Policy, stemming from a sexual harassment accusation	
June 29, 2018	1 game	Nigel Bradham	LB	Philadelphia Eagles	Violation of the Personal Conduct Policy, stemming from a 2016 arrest	
July 20, 2018	1 game	Dante Fowler	DE	Jacksonville Jaguars	Violation of the Personal Conduct Policy	
August 12, 2018	1 game	Jalen Ramsey	CB	Jacksonville Jaguars	Violation of team rules	
August 21, 2018	4 games	Jimmy Smith	CB	Baltimore Ravens	Violation of the Personal Conduct Policy	
October 2, 2018	8 games	Mychal Kendricks	LB	Seattle Seahawks	Violation of the Personal Conduct Policy, stemming from a guilty plea to insider trading	
November 26, 2018	1 game	Leonard Fournette	RB	Jacksonville Jaguars	Fighting Buffalo Bills defensive end Shaq Lawson during a game	
September 30, 2019	Remainder of the 2019 season (12 games)	Vontaze Burfict	LB	Oakland Raiders	Repeat violation of the league's player safety policies, stemming from a hit on Indianapolis Colts tight end Jack Doyle	
November 15, 2019	Indefinite (reinstated February 12, 2020)	Myles Garrett	DE	Cleveland Browns	Violated unnecessary roughness and unsportsmanlike conduct rules, fighting, removing the helmet of an opponent, using a helmet as a weapon	
November 15, 2019	1 game	Larry Ogunjobi	DT	Cleveland Browns	Unnecessary roughness	
November 15, 2019	3 games (later reduced to 2 games)	Maurkice Pouncey	C	Pittsburgh Steelers	Fighting	
April 21, 2023	6 games (later reduced to 4 games)	Jameson Williams	WR	Detroit Lions	Betting on non-NFL sporting events from a team-owned facility	
April 21, 2023	6 games (later reduced to 4 games)	Stanley Berryhill	WR	Detroit Lions	Betting on non-NFL sporting events from a team-owned facility	
April 21, 2023	Indefinite (reinstated April 18, 2024)	C. J. Moore	S	Detroit Lions	Betting on NFL games	
April 21, 2023	Indefinite (reinstated April 18, 2024)	Quintez Cephus	WR	Detroit Lions	Betting on NFL games	
April 21, 2023	Indefinite (reinstated April 18, 2024)	Shaka Toney	DE	Washington Commanders	Betting on NFL games	
June 29, 2023	6 games (later reduced to 4 games)	Nicholas Petit-Frere	OT	Tennessee Titans	Betting on non-NFL sporting events from a team-owned facility	
June 29, 2023	Indefinite (reinstated April 18, 2024)	Isaiah Rodgers	CB	Indianapolis Colts	Betting on NFL games	
June 29, 2023	Indefinite (reinstated April 18, 2024)	Rashod Berry	DE	Indianapolis Colts	Betting on NFL games	
June 29, 2023	Indefinite (reinstated April 18, 2024)	Demetrius Taylor	DE	Free agent	Betting on NFL games	
December 3, 2024	3 games	Azeez Al-Shaair	LB	Houston Texans	Illegal hit on Jaguars quarterback Trevor Lawrence, fighting	
December 4, 2024	1 game	Diontae Johnson	WR	Baltimore Ravens	Conduct detrimental to the team	
December 16, 2024	Remainder of the 2024 season (3 games)	De'Vondre Campbell	LB	San Francisco 49ers	Conduct detrimental to the team	
August 27, 2025	6 games	Rashee Rice	WR	Kansas City Chiefs	Causing a multi-vehicle collision previous year	

=== Suspensions for violating the substance policies ===
The NFL has two separate policies for substances that can lead to suspension. One policy concerns the use of banned drugs that are specifically indicated to improve athletic performance, performance-enhancing drugs (PEDs). The other policy concerns "substances of abuse" and includes drugs that may not enhance performance, but are indulged in for recreational purposes, including alcohol and marijuana related incidents.

Date suspended	Suspension length	Name	Position	Team at the time of suspension	Reference
July 26, 1983	4 games	Ross Browner	DE	Cincinnati Bengals	
July 26, 1983	4 games	Pete Johnson	FB	Cincinnati Bengals	
July 26, 1983	4 games	E. J. Junior	LB	St. Louis Cardinals	
July 26, 1983	4 games	Greg Stemrick	CB	New Orleans Saints	
November 13, 1983	Indefinite (reinstated in May 1984)	Tony Peters	S	Washington Redskins	
October 30, 1984	Entire 1984 and 1985 seasons	Stanley Wilson	RB	Cincinnati Bengals	
November 1984	Entire 1984 season	Chuck Muncie	RB	San Diego Chargers	
June 24, 1987	Entire 1987 season	Stanley Wilson	RB	Cincinnati Bengals	
July 27, 1988	4 games	Dexter Manley	DE	Washington Redskins	
August 3, 1988	4 games	Kevin Gogan	OG	Dallas Cowboys	
August 6, 1988	4 games	Doug DuBose	RB	San Francisco 49ers	
August 6, 1988	4 games	Robb Riddick	RB	Buffalo Bills	
August 6, 1988	4 games	Greg Townsend	DE	Los Angeles Raiders	
August 6, 1988	4 games	Richard Reed	DE	Denver Broncos	
August 6, 1988	4 games	Pat Saindon	OL	Atlanta Falcons	
August 13, 1988	Entire 1988 season	Tony Collins	RB	Indianapolis Colts	
August 30, 1988	4 games	Lawrence Taylor	LB	New York Giants	
August 31, 1988	4 games	Terry Taylor	CB	Seattle Seahawks	
September 1, 1988	4 games	Emanuel King	LB	Cincinnati Bengals	
September 1, 1988	4 games	Daryl Smith	CB	Cincinnati Bengals	
September 3, 1988	4 games	Bruce Smith	DE	Buffalo Bills	
September 3, 1988	4 games	John Taylor	WR	San Francisco 49ers	
September 8, 1988	4 games	Charles White	RB	Los Angeles Rams	
November 10, 1988	4 games	Doug Smith	NT	Houston Oilers	
November 10, 1988	4 games	Hal Garner	LB	Buffalo Bills	
November 30, 1988	4 games	Mark Duper	WR	Miami Dolphins	
November 30, 1988	4 games	Victor Scott	DB	Dallas Cowboys	
May 15, 1989	Life	Stanley Wilson	RB	Cincinnati Bengals	
August 12, 1989	30 days	Tony Burse	FB	Seattle Seahawks	
August 30, 1989	4 games	Vince Amoia	RB	New York Jets	
August 30, 1989	4 games	Bobby Riley	WR	New York Jets	
August 30, 1989	4 games	Ron Solt	OG	Philadelphia Eagles	
August 30, 1989	4 games	Leroy Irvin	CB	Los Angeles Rams	
August 30, 1989	4 games	Orson Mobley	TE	Denver Broncos	
August 30, 1989	4 games	Maurice Douglass	DB	Chicago Bears	
August 30, 1989	4 games	Matt Jaworski	LB	Buffalo Bills	
August 30, 1989	4 games	Tom Doctor	LB	Buffalo Bills	
August 30, 1989	4 games	Sean Doctor	FB	Buffalo Bills	
August 30, 1989	4 games	Mike Ariey	OL	Green Bay Packers	
August 30, 1989	4 games	Keith Uecker	OL	Green Bay Packers	
August 30, 1989	4 games	Mark Mraz	DE	Los Angeles Raiders	
August 30, 1989	4 games	Vernon Kirk	TE	Los Angeles Rams	
August 30, 1989	4 games	Keith Henderson	RB	San Francisco 49ers	
August 30, 1989	4 games	Rollin Putzier	NT	San Francisco 49ers	
September 1, 1989	4 games	Kevin Mack	FB	Cleveland Browns	
September 2, 1989	4 games	Keith Browner	LB	San Diego Chargers	
November 6, 1989	4 games	Barry Wilburn	CB	Washington Redskins	
November 17, 1989	Entire 1989 season	Dexter Manley	DE	Washington Redskins	
April 13, 1990	Entire 1990 season	Frank Warren	DE	New Orleans Saints	
August 13, 1990	5 games	Louis Cheek	OL	Dallas Cowboys	
August 13, 1990	5 games	John Brandom	OL	Phoenix Cardinals	
August 17, 1990	3 games	Carl Bax	OG	Tampa Bay Buccaneers	
August 24, 1990	5 games	Brian Sochia	NT	Miami Dolphins	
September 20, 1990	Entire 1990 season	Terry Taylor	CB	Detroit Lions	
October 31, 1991	6 games	Tim Worley	RB	Pittsburgh Steelers	
November 15, 1991	4 games	Terry Long	OG	Pittsburgh Steelers	
April 30, 1992	Entire 1992 season	Tim Worley	RB	Pittsburgh Steelers	
November 9, 1992	6 games	Eric Green	TE	Pittsburgh Steelers	
July 31, 1993	4 games	Eric Moore	OG	New York Giants	
November 30, 1994	4 games	Frank Wycheck	FB	Washington Redskins	
July 25, 1995	6 games	Bernard Williams	LT	Philadelphia Eagles	
August 11, 1995	4 games	Jamir Miller	LB	Arizona Cardinals	
August 11, 1995	6 games	Larry Webster	DT	Cleveland Browns	
August 25, 1995	Entire 1995 season	Chuck Levy	RB	Arizona Cardinals	
August 25, 1995	6 games	Tim Harris	DE	San Francisco 49ers	
October 23, 1995	4 games	Joel Steed	NT	Pittsburgh Steelers	
October 23, 1995	Indefinite (Note: Williams remained on Philadelphia's inactive roster until November 2023, when the team waived him.)	Bernard Williams	LT	Philadelphia Eagles	
November 3, 1995	4 games	Leon Lett	DT	Dallas Cowboys	
November 3, 1995	4 games	Clayton Holmes	CB	Dallas Cowboys	
December 4, 1995	Entire 1996 season	Carlton Haselrig	OL	New York Jets	
July 23, 1996	4 games	Roosevelt Potts	RB	Indianapolis Colts	
July 25, 1996	5 games	Michael Irvin	WR	Dallas Cowboys	
August 20, 1996	Entire 1996 season	Larry Webster	DT	Baltimore Ravens	
December 4, 1996	16 games	Leon Lett	DT	Dallas Cowboys	
September 13, 1997	4 games	Scott Davis	OG	Atlanta Falcons	
August 19, 1997	4 games	Artie Ulmer	LB	Minnesota Vikings	
August 28, 1997	4 games	Matt Stevens	FS	Philadelphia Eagles	
November 18, 1998	4 games	Bob Sapp	OG	Minnesota Vikings	
September 1, 1998	4 games	Paul Wiggins	OT	Pittsburgh Steelers	
December 23, 1998	4 games	Jude Waddy	LB	Green Bay Packers	
July 16, 1999	8 games	Leonard Little	DE	St. Louis Rams	
September 15, 1999	8 games	Leon Lett	DT	Dallas Cowboys	
October 21, 1999	4 games	Travis Jervey	RB	San Francisco 49ers	
November 24, 1999	4 games	Lyle West	FS	New York Giants	
November 26, 1999	4 games	Jason Ferguson	NT	New York Jets	
December 2, 1999	4 games	Jim Miller	QB	Chicago Bears	
April 11, 2000	Indefinite (reinstated)	Larry Webster	DT	Baltimore Ravens	
April 11, 2000	Indefinite (reinstated in Nov. 2001)	Dale Carter	CB	Denver Broncos	
June 21, 2000	Entire 2000 season	Josh Evans	DT	Tennessee Titans	
June 8, 2001	Entire 2001 season	R. Jay Soward	WR	Jacksonville Jaguars	
August 3, 2001	4 games	Terry Glenn	WR	New England Patriots	
August 7, 2001	4 games	Darrell Russell	DT	Oakland Raiders	
October 5, 2001	4 games	Henry Taylor	DT	Chicago Bears	
November 28, 2001	4 games	Shawn Springs	CB	Seattle Seahawks	
December 15, 2001	4 games	Tommy Bennett	FS	Detroit Lions	
January 2, 2002	Entire 2002 season	Darrell Russell	DT	Oakland Raiders	
January 8, 2002	4 games	Daimon Shelton	FB	Chicago Bears	
January 10, 2002	Entire 2002 season	R. Jay Soward	WR	Jacksonville Jaguars	
May 24, 2002	Entire 2002 and 2003 seasons	Rashard Anderson	WR	Carolina Panthers	
July 20, 2002	Indefinite (reinstated in Nov. 2002)	Dale Carter	CB	New Orleans Saints	
September 7, 2002	4 games	T. J. Slaughter	LB	Jacksonville Jaguars	
September 11, 2002	4 games	Ray Buchanan	CB	Atlanta Falcons	
October 2, 2002	4 games	Tyrone Robertson	DT	Buffalo Bills	
November 4, 2002	4 games	Brentson Buckner	DT	Carolina Panthers	
November 6, 2002	4 games	Lewis Bush	LB	Kansas City Chiefs	
November 18, 2002	4 games	DeMingo Graham	OG	Houston Texans	
December 4, 2002	4 games	Julius Peppers	DE	Carolina Panthers	
December 10, 2002	Entire 2003 season	Tyrone Robertson	DT	Buffalo Bills	
March 28, 2003	4 games	Mike Cloud	RB	Free agent	
July 11, 2003	4 games	Byron Chamberlain	TE	Minnesota Vikings	
July 26, 2003	4 games	Lee Flowers	LB	Denver Broncos	
August 30, 2003	4 games	Keith Newman	LB	Atlanta Falcons	
September 26, 2003	4 games	Scott Shanle	LB	St. Louis Rams	
November 14, 2003	4 games	William Green	RB	Cleveland Browns	
December 3, 2003	4 games	Raynoch Thompson	LB	Arizona Cardinals	
July 26, 2004	Indefinite	Darrell Russell	DT	Free agent	
September 6, 2004	4 games	Adrian Madise	WR	Denver Broncos	
September 6, 2004	4 games	Wendell Bryant	DT	Arizona Cardinals	
October 4, 2004	4 games	Onterrio Smith	RB	Minnesota Vikings	
October 9, 2004	2 games	Jamal Lewis	RB	Baltimore Ravens	
November 9, 2004	4 games	Andrew Pinnock	FB	San Diego Chargers	
November 23, 2004	4 games	Koren Robinson	WR	Seattle Seahawks	
December 6, 2004	4 games	David Boston	WR	Miami Dolphins	
June 7, 2005	Entire 2005 season	Onterrio Smith	RB	Minnesota Vikings	
July 12, 2005	4 games	Eric Warfield	CB	Kansas City Chiefs	
July 30, 2005	Entire 2005 season	Wendell Bryant	DT	Arizona Cardinals	
August 31, 2005	Entire 2005 season	Kendyll Pope	LB	Indianapolis Colts	
September 3, 2005	4 games	John Welbourn	OL	Kansas City Chiefs	
September 16, 2005	4 games	Rick Razzano	FB	Tampa Bay Buccaneers	
September 27, 2005	4 games	Travis Henry	RB	Tennessee Titans	
October 3, 2005	4 games	Charles Rogers	WR	Detroit Lions	
April 25, 2006	Entire 2006 season	Ricky Williams	RB	Miami Dolphins	
July 7, 2006	4 games	Todd Sauerbrun	P	Denver Broncos	
July 13, 2006	4 games	Odell Thurman	MLB	Cincinnati Bengals	
September 1, 2006	4 games	Sammy Morris	RB	Miami Dolphins	
September 25, 2006	Entire 2006 and 2007 seasons	Odell Thurman	MLB	Cincinnati Bengals	
October 17, 2006	4 games	Matt Lehr	OG	Atlanta Falcons	
October 17, 2006	4 games	Shaun Rogers	DT	Detroit Lions	
October 17, 2006	Entire 2006 season	Koren Robinson	WR	Green Bay Packers	
October 22, 2006	4 games	Shawne Merriman	LB	San Diego Chargers	
December 5, 2006	4 games	Hollis Thomas	DT	New Orleans Saints	
July 4, 2007	4 games	Dominic Rhodes	RB	Oakland Raiders	
July 6, 2007	4 games	Kenny Peterson	DE	Denver Broncos	
July 20, 2007	4 games	Jarrod Cooper	SS	Oakland Raiders	
August 3, 2007	4 games	Ryan Tucker	RT	Cleveland Browns	
September 2, 2007	4 games	Rodney Harrison	SS	New England Patriots	
August 9, 2007	4 games	Obafemi Ayanbadejo	FB	Chicago Bears	
October 5, 2007	6 games	Tim Couch	QB	Free agent	
October 5, 2007	6 games	Kenard Lang	DE	Free agent	
November 3, 2007	4 games	Chris Henry	RB	Tennessee Titans	
November 6, 2007	4 games	Marcus Stroud	DT	Jacksonville Jaguars	
December 5, 2007	4 games	Ray Edwards	DE	Minnesota Vikings	
April 15, 2008	4 games	Stephen Cooper	LB	San Diego Chargers	
June 6, 2008	Indefinite	Odell Thurman	MLB	Free agent	
June 12, 2008	4 games	Adrian Awasom	DE	Free agent	
August 19, 2008	4 games	Luke Petitgout	OT	Tampa Bay Buccaneers	
August 30, 2008	4 games	Jesse Chatman	RB	New York Jets	
August 31, 2008	Indefinite (reinstated in Aug. 2012)	Travis Henry	RB	Free agent	
August 31, 2008	4 games	Jonathan Clinkscale	OG	Free agent	
August 31, 2008	4 games	Tony Gonzalez	WR	Free agent	
August 31, 2008	4 games	Mario Haggan	LB	Free agent	
August 31, 2008	4 games	Luke Petitgout	OT	Free agent	
August 31, 2008	4 games	Dexter Reid	FS	Free agent	
August 31, 2008	3 games	Darrion Scott	CB	Free agent	
August 31, 2008	4 games	E. J. Underwood	DB	Free agent	
August 31, 2008	5 games	Jimmy Williams	CB	Free agent	
August 31, 2008	1 game	Cedrick Wilson	WR	Free agent	
October 7, 2008	4 games	Darryl Blackstock	LB	Cincinnati Bengals	
October 21, 2008	3 games	Matt Jones	WR	Jacksonville Jaguars	
July 2, 2009	4 games	Calvin Pace	LB	New York Jets	
August 17, 2009	1 game	Shaun Ellis	DE	New York Jets	
August 18, 2009	4 games	Tanard Jackson	FS	Tampa Bay Buccaneers	
November 11, 2009	4 games	Joselio Hanson	CB	Philadelphia Eagles	
November 17, 2009	4 games	Dwayne Bowe	WR	Kansas City Chiefs	
December 24, 2009	4 games	Luke Lawton	FB	Oakland Raiders	
March 7, 2010	8 games	Ryan Tucker	RT	Free agent	
March 7, 2010	8 games	Jason Ferguson	NT	Free agent	
April 12, 2010	4 games	Santonio Holmes	WR	New York Jets	
May 7, 2010	4 games	Brian Cushing	LB	Houston Texans	
June 14, 2010	4 games	Gerald McRath	LB	Tennessee Titans	
June 21, 2010	4 games	Ed Gant	WR	Arizona Cardinals	
July 1, 2010	4 games	LenDale White	RB	Free agent	
July 1, 2010	8 games	Hollis Thomas	DT	Free agent	
July 8, 2010	4 games	Robert James	LB	Atlanta Falcons	
July 16, 2010	1 game	Leroy Hill	LB	Seattle Seahawks	
July 16, 2010	Indefinite (reinstated in Feb. 2013)	Johnny Jolly	DE	Green Bay Packers	
July 22, 2010	2 games	Cary Williams	CB	Baltimore Ravens	
August 3, 2010	1 game	Jonathan Babineaux	DT	Atlanta Falcons	
September 4, 2010	4 games	Shawn Nelson	TE	Buffalo Bills	
September 21, 2010	4 games	Duane Brown	LT	Houston Texans	
September 22, 2010	Indefinite (reinstated in Oct. 2011)	Tanard Jackson	FS	Tampa Bay Buccaneers	
October 4, 2010	4 games	Steve Gregory	SS	San Diego Chargers	
October 15, 2010	4 games	Antwan Odom	DE	Cincinnati Bengals	
December 10, 2010	4 games	Duke Robinson	OG	Carolina Panthers	
December 10, 2010	4 games	Brandon Spikes	LB	New England Patriots	
August 2, 2011	4 games	Phillip Buchanon	CB	Washington Redskins	
September 2, 2011	2 games	Kevin Williams	DT	Minnesota Vikings	
September 2, 2011	2 games	Pat Williams	DT	Free agent	
September 2, 2011	2 games	Will Smith	DE	New Orleans Saints	
September 2, 2011	2 games	Charles Grant	DE	Free agent	
September 2, 2011	4 games	Eric Alexander	LB	Free agent	
September 2, 2011	4 games	Eric Barton	LB	Free agent	
September 2, 2011	4 games	Robert Brewster	OT	Free agent	
September 2, 2011	4 games	Vinny Ciurciu	LB	Free agent	
September 2, 2011	1 game	Harry Coleman	LB	Free agent	
September 2, 2011	4 games	Brandon Lang	LB	Free agent	
September 2, 2011	Entire 2011 season	Dominic Rhodes	RB	Free agent	
September 3, 2011	4 games	Bobbie Williams	OG	Cincinnati Bengals	
September 3, 2011	4 games	Ahmard Hall	FB	Tennessee Titans	
September 9, 2011	1 game	David Reed	WR	Baltimore Ravens	
October 5, 2011	4 games	Jaimie Thomas	OG	Indianapolis Colts	
October 12, 2011	4 games	Jimmy Kennedy	DT	New York Giants	
December 6, 2011	4 games	Vai Taua	RB	Seattle Seahawks	
December 4, 2011	4 games	Fred Davis	TE	Washington Redskins	
December 4, 2011	4 games	Trent Williams	OT	Washington Redskins	
December 6, 2011	4 games	John Moffitt	OG	Seattle Seahawks	
December 21, 2011	4 games	Austin Pettis	WR	St. Louis Rams	
February 6, 2012	4 games	Weslye Saunders	TE	Indianapolis Colts	
February 15, 2012	4 games	Nick Miller	WR	St. Louis Rams	
March 9, 2012	3 games	Brett Hartmann	P	Houston Texans	
March 9, 2012	6 games	D. J. Williams	LB	Denver Broncos	
March 9, 2012	6 games	Ryan McBean	DT	Denver Broncos	
March 9, 2012	4 games	Virgil Green	TE	Denver Broncos	
March 9, 2012	3 games	Dwayne Jarrett	WR	Free agent	
March 13, 2012	4 games	Mike Neal	DE	Green Bay Packers	
March 30, 2012	4 games (Later overturned)	Andre Brown	RB	Free agent	
May 23, 2012	4 games	Allen Barbre	OT	Seattle Seahawks	
June 7, 2012	3 games	Ramon Humber	LB	Free agent	
June 11, 2012	3 games	Jerome Simpson	WR	Minnesota Vikings	
June 13, 2012	4 games	Dontay Moch	LB	Cincinnati Bengals	
June 13, 2012	2 games	Mikel Leshoure	RB	Detroit Lions	
July 1, 2012	4 games	Trevis Turner	OT	Free agent	
July 2, 2012	4 games	Brody Eldridge	TE	St. Louis Rams	
July 6, 2012	1 game	Lawrence Wilson	LB	New Orleans Saints	
July 18, 2012	4 games	Andre Neblett	DT	Carolina Panthers	
July 20, 2012	1 game	Nate Collins	DT	Chicago Bears	
July 31, 2012	4 games	Tyler Sash	S	New York Giants	
August 16, 2012	4 games	Garrett Brown	DT	San Diego Chargers	
August 20, 2012	1 game	Tamba Hali	LB	Kansas City Chiefs	
August 31, 2012	Indefinite (reinstated in May 2014)	Tanard Jackson	FS	Washington Redskins	
September 10, 2012	4 games	Joe Haden	CB	Cleveland Browns	
September 18, 2012	3 games	Clark Haggans	LB	San Francisco 49ers	
September 22, 2012	4 games	Gerell Robinson	WR	Arizona Cardinals	
October 5, 2012	3 games	D. J. Williams	LB	Denver Broncos	
October 8, 2012	4 games	Will Hill	FS	New York Giants	
October 13, 2012	4 games	Aqib Talib	CB	Tampa Bay Buccaneers	
October 27, 2012	4 games	Lee Ziemba	OT	Carolina Panthers	
October 28, 2012	4 games	Eric Wright	CB	Tampa Bay Buccaneers	
November 9, 2012	4 games	Brandon Bolden	RB	New England Patriots	
November 19, 2012	4 games	Joe Hawley	C	Atlanta Falcons	
November 20, 2012	4 games	Winston Guy	SS	Seattle Seahawks	
November 26, 2012	4 games	Jermaine Cunningham	DE	New England Patriots	
December 4, 2012	4 games	Cedric Griffin	CB	Washington Redskins	
December 5, 2012	4 games	Brandon Browner	CB	Seattle Seahawks	
December 11, 2012	4 games	Asa Jackson	CB	Baltimore Ravens	
December 17, 2012	4 games	Jordan Black	OT	Washington Redskins	
December 18, 2012	4 games	Quentin Saulsberry	OG	Denver Broncos	
February 13, 2013	4 games	Javarris James	RB	Arizona Cardinals	
March 14, 2013	4 games	Deuce Lutui	OG	Free agent	
March 20, 2013	4 games	Rob Jackson	LB	Washington Redskins	
April 1, 2013	4 games	Christian Thompson	S	Free agent	
April 1, 2013	4 games	Daryl Washington	LB	Arizona Cardinals	
April 17, 2013	4 games	Larry Grant	LB	Free agent	
April 19, 2013	4 games	James Sanders	S	Free agent	
April 20, 2013	4 games	Justin Blackmon	WR	Jacksonville Jaguars	
May 17, 2013	4 games	Bruce Irvin	DE	Seattle Seahawks	
May 22, 2013	1 game	Rokevious Watkins	OG	St. Louis Rams	
May 31, 2013	1 game	Isaiah Pead	RB	St. Louis Rams	
June 4, 2013	4 games	Gabe Miller	TE	Chicago Bears	
June 7, 2013	2 games	Josh Gordon	WR	Cleveland Browns	
June 24, 2013	4 games	Brandon Collins	WR	New York Giants	
June 24, 2013	4 games	LaVon Brazill	WR	Indianapolis Colts	
July 18, 2013	8 games	Weslye Saunders	TE	Indianapolis Colts	
July 19, 2013	4 games	Bert Reed	WR	Free agent	
July 20, 2013	4 games	Will Hill	FS	New York Giants	
July 26, 2013	4 games	Jarvis Jenkins	DE	Washington Redskins	
July 27, 2013	4 games	Andre Holmes	WR	Oakland Raiders	
August 1, 2013	4 games	DeMarcus Love	OT	Minnesota Vikings	
August 2, 2013	8 games	Asa Jackson	CB	Baltimore Ravens	
August 14, 2013	1 game	Demarcus Dobbs	DE	San Francisco 49ers	
August 14, 2013	4 games	Jo-Lonn Dunbar	LB	St. Louis Rams	
August 20, 2013	6 games	Von Miller	LB	Denver Broncos	
August 26, 2013	3 games	Jerome Felton	FB	Minnesota Vikings	
August 26, 2013	4 games	Mike Goodson	RB	New York Jets	
August 30, 2013	8 games	DeQuin Evans	DE	Cincinnati Bengals	
September 3, 2013	4 games	R.J. Mattes	OT	Free agent	
September 10, 2013	4 games	Tom Zbikowski	SS	Free agent	
September 10, 2013	2 games	Brandon McDonald	CB	Free agent	
October 12, 2013	4 games	Kellen Winslow II	TE	New York Jets	
November 1, 2013	Indefinite	Justin Blackmon	WR	Jacksonville Jaguars	
November 12, 2013	4 games	LaRoy Reynolds	LB	Jacksonville Jaguars	
November 24, 2013	4 games	Walter Thurmond	CB	Seattle Seahawks	
December 3, 2013	4 games	Travis Lewis	LB	Detroit Lions	
December 18, 2013	4 games (reinstated in Mar. 2014)	Brandon Browner	CB	Seattle Seahawks	
February 19, 2014	Indefinite (reinstated in May 2015)	Fred Davis	TE	Washington Redskins	
April 4, 2014	4 games	Jake Knott	LB	Philadelphia Eagles	
April 8, 2014	4 games	Brandon Moore	DE	Washington Redskins	
April 21, 2014	4 games	Brian Tyms	WR	New England Patriots	
May 2, 2014	4 games	Frank Alexander	DE	Carolina Panthers	
May 12, 2014	4 games (Later overturned)	Stedman Bailey	WR	St. Louis Rams	
May 16, 2014	4 games	Robert Mathis	LB	Indianapolis Colts	
May 21, 2014	1 game	Marlon Moore	WR	Cleveland Browns	
May 30, 2014	Entire 2014 season (reinstated in April 2017)	Daryl Washington	LB	Arizona Cardinals	
May 30, 2014	6 games	Will Hill	SS	New York Giants	
June 4, 2014	4 games	Jayron Hosley	CB	New York Giants	
July 3, 2014	4 games	Rokevious Watkins	OT	Kansas City Chiefs	
July 3, 2014	4 games	Dion Jordan	DE	Miami Dolphins	
July 3, 2014	Entire 2014 season (later changed to 10 games)	LaVon Brazill	WR	Indianapolis Colts	
July 9, 2014	Indefinite	Tanard Jackson	FS	Washington Redskins	
July 11, 2014	4 games	Spencer Nealy	DE	Minnesota Vikings	
July 22, 2014	4 games	Ace Sanders	WR	Jacksonville Jaguars	
July 23, 2014	4 games	Lane Johnson	OT	Philadelphia Eagles	
July 30, 2014	1 game	Nigel Bradham	LB	Buffalo Bills	
July 30, 2014	2 games	Chris Lewis-Harris	CB	Cincinnati Bengals	
August 8, 2014	4 games	Eric Herman	OG	New York Giants	
August 8, 2014	4 games	Reshad Jones	FS	Miami Dolphins	
August 11, 2014	4 games (Later overturned)	Orlando Scandrick	CB	Dallas Cowboys	
August 15, 2014	1 game	Dwayne Bowe	WR	Kansas City Chiefs	
August 22, 2014	4 games	Donald Stephenson	OL	Kansas City Chiefs	
August 23, 2014	4 games	Matt Prater	K	Denver Broncos	
August 27, 2014	Entire 2014 season (later changed to 10 games)	Josh Gordon	WR	Cleveland Browns	
August 29, 2014	9 games	Aldon Smith	OLB	San Francisco 49ers	
August 29, 2014	4 games	Jakar Hamilton	FS	Dallas Cowboys	
August 29, 2014	3 games	Jerome Simpson	WR	Minnesota Vikings	
September 2, 2014	4 games (Later overturned)	Wes Welker	WR	Denver Broncos	
September 4, 2014	8 games	Andre Brown	RB	Free agent	
September 4, 2014	4 games	Erin Henderson	LB	Free agent	
September 5, 2014	4 games	D.C. Jefferson	TE	Carolina Panthers	
September 19, 2014	4 games	Dion Jordan	DE	Miami Dolphins	
September 29, 2014	4 games	LaRon Landry	FS	Indianapolis Colts	
October 1, 2014	10 games	Frank Alexander	DE	Carolina Panthers	
October 15, 2014	2 games	Jorvorskie Lane	FB	Tampa Bay Buccaneers	
October 21, 2014	2 games	Da'Quan Bowers	DE	Tampa Bay Buccaneers	
December 4, 2014	4 games	Haloti Ngata	DT	Baltimore Ravens	
December 17, 2014	4 games	Craig Watts	OG	San Diego Chargers	
February 3, 2015	Entire 2015 season	Josh Gordon	WR	Cleveland Browns	
March 7, 2015	10 games	LaRon Landry	FS	Free agent	
April 7, 2015	1 game	LeGarrette Blount	RB	New England Patriots	
April 9, 2015	3 games (later reduced to 2 games)	Le'Veon Bell	RB	Pittsburgh Steelers	
April 13, 2015	4 games	Victor Butler	LB	New York Giants	
April 13, 2015	4 games	Eben Britton	OL	Free agent	
April 28, 2015	Entire 2015 season	Dion Jordan	DE	Miami Dolphins	
May 21, 2015	1 game	Marcell Dareus	DT	Buffalo Bills	
May 29, 2015	4 games	Trey Watts	RB	St. Louis Rams	
June 22, 2015	1 game	Ahmad Bradshaw	RB	Free agent	
June 29, 2015	4 games	Kyle Knox	LB	Free agent	
July 2, 2015	4 games	Sheldon Richardson	DE	New York Jets	
July 2, 2015	4 games	Rolando McClain	LB	Dallas Cowboys	
July 2, 2015	1 game	Datone Jones	DE	Green Bay Packers	
July 2, 2015	4 games	Antonio Gates	TE	San Diego Chargers	
July 13, 2015	4 games	Jarrett Bush	CB	Free agent	
July 13, 2015	10 games	Jakar Hamilton	FS	Free agent	
July 13, 2015	10 games	Loucheiz Purifoy	CB	Free agent	
July 13, 2015	1 game	Quentin Hines	RB	Free agent	
July 23, 2015	3 games	Letroy Guion	DT	Green Bay Packers	
July 24, 2015	3 games	Sean Smith	CB	Kansas City Chiefs	
July 24, 2015	4 games	Derek Wolfe	DE	Denver Broncos	
July 24, 2015	2 games	Jabari Price	CB	Minnesota Vikings	
July 31, 2015	1 game	Bashaud Breeland	CB	Washington Redskins	
August 3, 2015	10 games	Ace Sanders	WR	Free agent	
August 11, 2015	3 games (later reduced to 2 games)	Bobby Massie	OT	Arizona Cardinals	
August 13, 2015	2 games	Da'Rick Rogers	WR	Free agent	
August 17, 2015	4 games	Ryan Seymour	OG	Cleveland Browns	
August 17, 2015	1 game	Akeem Spence	DT	Tampa Bay Buccaneers	
August 18, 2015	6 games	Jerome Simpson	WR	San Francisco 49ers	
August 20, 2015	1 game	Oday Aboushi	OG	New York Jets	
August 21, 2015	10 games	Jarrett Bush	CB	Free agent	
August 24, 2015	3 games	Jeremiah Ratliff	DT	Chicago Bears	
August 27, 2015	4 games	Martavis Bryant	WR	Pittsburgh Steelers	
August 28, 2015	4 games	R. J. Dill	OL	Dallas Cowboys	
October 2, 2015	4 games	A. J. Cruz	WR	Free agent	
October 30, 2015	1 game	Matt Elam	SS	Baltimore Ravens	
November 3, 2015	4 games	Kaleb Ramsey	DE	San Francisco 49ers	
November 4, 2015	Indefinite	Trey Watts	RB	St. Louis Rams	
November 9, 2015	4 games	Stedman Bailey	WR	St. Louis Rams	
November 10, 2015	4 games	Tayo Fabuluje	OT	Chicago Bears	
November 10, 2015	4 games	Jalen Saunders	WR	Chicago Bears	
November 12, 2015	4 games	Ego Ferguson	DE	Chicago Bears	
November 13, 2015	4 games	Clyde Gates	WR	Free agent	
November 17, 2015	Entire 2016 season	Aldon Smith	OLB	Oakland Raiders	
November 18, 2015	4 games	Silas Redd	RB	Washington Redskins	
November 23, 2015	4 games	Wes Horton	DE	Carolina Panthers	
November 23, 2015	1 game	Stephen Hill	WR	Carolina Panthers	
November 24, 2015	Indefinite	LaRon Landry	FS	Free agent	
November 24, 2015	Entire 2015 season	Frank Alexander	DE	Carolina Panthers	
December 7, 2015	4 games	Nick Boyle	TE	Baltimore Ravens	
December 8, 2015	4 games	Kwon Alexander	LB	Tampa Bay Buccaneers	
December 10, 2015	10 games	Jalen Saunders	WR	Chicago Bears	
December 28, 2015	4 games	Marcel Reece	FB	Oakland Raiders	
February 19, 2016	4 games	Randy Gregory	DE	Dallas Cowboys	
February 19, 2016	10 games	Nick Boyle	TE	Baltimore Ravens	
February 19, 2016	4 games	Mike Pennel	NT	Green Bay Packers	
March 4, 2016	4 games	Armonty Bryant	OLB	Cleveland Browns	
March 14, 2016	Entire 2016 season	Martavis Bryant	WR	Pittsburgh Steelers	
March 14, 2016	4 games	Taylor Mays	SS	Free agent	
March 14, 2016	4 games	Nick Moody	LB	Free agent	
March 16, 2016	10 games	Will Hill	SS	Free agent	
April 8, 2016	4 games	Jalen Collins	CB	Atlanta Falcons	
April 8, 2016	4 games	Aaron Colvin	CB	Jacksonville Jaguars	
April 8, 2016	4 games	Demetri Goodson	CB	Green Bay Packers	
April 8, 2016	4 games	Andrew Turzilli	WR	Tennessee Titans	
April 12, 2016	Indefinite (reinstated in Dec. 2016)	Silas Redd	RB	Washington Redskins	
May 6, 2016	2 games	Bernard Pierce	RB	Free agent	
May 6, 2016	4 games	Jace Davis	WR	Free agent	
June 30, 2016	4 games	DeMarcus Lawrence	DE	Dallas Cowboys	
June 30, 2016	10 games	Rolando McClain	LB	Dallas Cowboys	
June 30, 2016	4 games	Johnny Manziel	QB	Free agent	
July 1, 2016	4 games	Darren Waller	TE	Baltimore Ravens	
July 15, 2016	4 games	Aaron Lynch	OLB	San Francisco 49ers	
July 15, 2016	4 games	Karlos Williams	RB	Buffalo Bills	
July 22, 2016	4 games	Arthur Jones	DE	Indianapolis Colts	
July 25, 2016	4 games	Josh Gordon	WR	Cleveland Browns	
August 5, 2016	1 game	Marqueston Huff	CB	Tennessee Titans	
August 12, 2016	2 games	Shiloh Keo	S	Denver Broncos	
August 16, 2016	4 games	Marcell Dareus	DT	Buffalo Bills	
August 17, 2016	4 games	Zach Sterup	OT	Kansas City Chiefs	
August 19, 2016	3 games	Le'Veon Bell	RB	Pittsburgh Steelers	
August 24, 2016	4 games	Damion Square	DE	San Diego Chargers	
August 30, 2016	4 games	Sammie Lee Hill	DT	Free agent	
September 2, 2016	4 games	Rob Ninkovich	DE	New England Patriots	
September 3, 2016	4 games	Chris Scott	OG	Carolina Panthers	
September 7, 2016	4 games	Seantrel Henderson	OT	Buffalo Bills	
September 15, 2016	10 games	Nikita Whitlock	FB	New York Giants	
September 29, 2016	10 games	Randy Gregory	DE	Dallas Cowboys	
October 11, 2016	10 games	Lane Johnson	OT	Philadelphia Eagles	
November 1, 2016	4 games	Trent Williams	OT	Washington Redskins	
November 1, 2016	3 games	Armonty Bryant	DE	Detroit Lions	
November 14, 2016	4 games	Alshon Jeffery	WR	Chicago Bears	
November 20, 2016	16 games	Rolando McClain	LB	Dallas Cowboys	
November 21, 2016	4 games	Jerrell Freeman	LB	Chicago Bears	
November 21, 2016	2 games	Jason Jones	DE	Miami Dolphins	
November 22, 2016	4 games	Jude Adjei-Barimah	CB	Tampa Bay Buccaneers	
November 23, 2016	10 games	Karlos Williams	RB	Pittsburgh Steelers	
November 29, 2016	10 games	Seantrel Henderson	OT	Buffalo Bills	
November 30, 2016	Indefinite	Sammie Lee Hill	DT	Free agent	
December 2, 2016	Indefinite	Rolando McClain	LB	Dallas Cowboys	
December 6, 2016	4 games	D'Qwell Jackson	LB	Indianapolis Colts	
December 6, 2016	4 games	Mike Pennel	DT	Green Bay Packers	
December 9, 2016	4 games	Jordan Payton	WR	Cleveland Browns	
December 9, 2016	4 games	Kenny Vaccaro	SS	New Orleans Saints	
December 12, 2016	4 games	Tenny Palepoi	DE	San Diego Chargers	
December 15, 2016	2 games	Alvin Bailey	OG	Cleveland Browns	
December 29, 2016	4 games	Doug Martin	RB	Tampa Bay Buccaneers	
January 5, 2017	Entire 2017 season	Randy Gregory	DE	Dallas Cowboys	
January 24, 2017	4 games	J'Marcus Webb	OT	Free agent	
March 7, 2017	4 games	Letroy Guion	DT	Green Bay Packers	
March 7, 2017	4 games	Jalin Marshall	WR	New York Jets	
March 9, 2017	4 games	Kenneth Dixon	RB	Baltimore Ravens	
March 15, 2017	4 games	Austin Seferian-Jenkins	TE	New York Jets	
March 29, 2017	8 games	T. J. McDonald	SS	Free agent	
April 14, 2017	4 games	Nick Marshall	CB	New York Jets	
April 14, 2017	4 games	Trent Murphy	OLB	Washington Redskins	
April 20, 2017	4 games	Brandon Bostick	TE	Free agent	
April 21, 2017	4 games	Shaquelle Evans	WR	Dallas Cowboys	
May 1, 2017	2 games	Troy Hill	CB	Los Angeles Rams	
May 4, 2017	4 games	Max Bullough	LB	Houston Texans	
May 25, 2017	4 games	Justin Gilbert	CB	Free agent	
June 1, 2017	4 games	James Ihedigbo	SS	Free agent	
June 8, 2017	4 games	Walter Powell	WR	Buffalo Bills	
June 20, 2017	6 games	Khyri Thornton	DT	Detroit Lions	
June 22, 2017	Entire 2017 season	Justin Gilbert	CB	Free agent	
June 28, 2017	4 games	David Irving	DE	Dallas Cowboys	
June 30, 2017	Entire 2017 season	Darren Waller	TE	Baltimore Ravens	
July 14, 2017	4 games	Michael Floyd	WR	Minnesota Vikings	
July 14, 2017	4 games	Mike Thomas	WR	Los Angeles Rams	
July 18, 2017	4 games	Armonty Bryant	DE	Detroit Lions	
July 19, 2017	1 game	Geronimo Allison	WR	Green Bay Packers	
July 28, 2017	2 games	Damontre Moore	DE	Dallas Cowboys	
August 6, 2017	10 games	Jalen Collins	CB	Atlanta Falcons	
August 22, 2017	4 games	Max Tuerk	C	Los Angeles Chargers	
August 24, 2017	1 game	Jaelen Strong	WR	Houston Texans	
August 28, 2017	4 games	Owa Odighizuwa	DE	New York Giants	
September 1, 2017	3 games	Willie Snead	WR	New Orleans Saints	
September 2, 2017	2 games	Sam Shields	CB	Free agent	
September 13, 2017	10 games	Brian Cushing	LB	Houston Texans	
November 6, 2017	4 games	Jeremy Kerley	WR	New York Jets	
November 20, 2017	4 games	Marcus Gilbert	OT	Pittsburgh Steelers	
December 1, 2017	4 games	Charles Johnson	DE	Carolina Panthers	
December 4, 2017	4 games	Jimmy Smith	CB	Baltimore Ravens	
December 23, 2017	10 games	Khyri Thornton	DT	Free agent	
March 19, 2018	2 games	Josh Huff	WR	New Orleans Saints	
March 23, 2018	4 games	Corey Liuget	DE	Los Angeles Chargers	
March 23, 2018	4 games	Josh Mauro	DE	New York Giants	
April 6, 2018	4 games	Thomas Davis Sr.	LB	Carolina Panthers	
April 9, 2018	10 games	Jalen Collins	CB	Free agent	
April 12, 2018	4 games	Vontaze Burfict	LB	Cincinnati Bengals	
April 13, 2018	4 games	Mark Sanchez	QB	Free agent	
April 20, 2018	4 games	Kentrell Brothers	LB	Minnesota Vikings	
April 20, 2018	4 games	Kent Taylor	TE	Carolina Panthers	
April 30, 2018	4 games	Cayleb Jones	WR	Minnesota Vikings	
May 1, 2018	4 games	Vadal Alexander	OL	Oakland Raiders	
May 4, 2018	4 games	Akeem Ayers	LB	New York Giants	
May 8, 2018	4 games	Mark Ingram II	RB	New Orleans Saints	
May 11, 2018	32 games	Jerrell Freeman	LB	Free agent	
May 22, 2018	1 game	Demetrius Harris	TE	Kansas City Chiefs	
June 1, 2018	4 games	Victor Bolden Jr.	WR	San Francisco 49ers	
June 6, 2018	4 games	Julian Edelman	WR	New England Patriots	
June 15, 2018	4 games	David Irving	DE	Dallas Cowboys	
June 29, 2018	4 games	Robert Turbin	RB	Indianapolis Colts	
July 3, 2018	2 games	Reuben Foster	LB	San Francisco 49ers	
July 3, 2018	2 games	Jamon Brown	OG	Los Angeles Rams	
July 3, 2018	2 games	Aaron Jones	RB	Green Bay Packers	
July 25, 2018	4 games	Rashard Robinson	CB	New York Jets	
July 27, 2018	2 games	ArDarius Stewart	WR	New York Jets	
August 11, 2018	1 game	Kevin Pierre-Louis	LB	New York Jets	
August 15, 2018	1 game	Carlos Henderson	WR	Denver Broncos	
September 1, 2018	4 games	Daryl Worley	CB	Oakland Raiders	
October 18, 2018	3 games	Terrance Williams	WR	Dallas Cowboys	
December 4, 2018	10 games	Kyle Nelson	LS	San Francisco 49ers	
December 7, 2018	4 games	Darron Lee	LB	New York Jets	
December 14, 2018	Indefinite	Martavis Bryant	WR	Oakland Raiders	
December 20, 2018	Indefinite	Josh Gordon	WR	New England Patriots	
February 26, 2019	Indefinite	Randy Gregory	DE	Dallas Cowboys	
March 1, 2019	Indefinite	David Irving	DT	Dallas Cowboys	
May 14, 2019	10 games	Dion Jordan	DE	Free agent	
May 16, 2019	6 games	Patrick Peterson	CB	Arizona Cardinals	
December 16, 2019	Indefinite	Josh Gordon	WR	Seattle Seahawks	
November 30, 2020	6 games	Will Fuller	WR	Houston Texans	
November 30, 2020	6 games	Bradley Roby	CB	Houston Texans	
October 21, 2024	2 games	Jameson Williams	WR	Detroit Lions	

== Coach suspensions ==
Date suspended	Suspension length	Name	Position	Team at the time of suspension	Reason	Reference
December 18, 1978	1 game	Chuck Fairbanks	Head coach	New England Patriots	Breaching his contract with the Patriots by joining the Colorado Buffaloes	
September 1, 2007	5 games	Wade Wilson	Quarterbacks coach	Dallas Cowboys	Purchasing and using performance-enhancing drugs	
August 31, 2010	30 days	Travis Jones	Defensive line coach	New Orleans Saints	Involvement in a real estate scam	
December 13, 2010	Indefinite	Sal Alosi	Head strength and conditioning coach	New York Jets	Tripping Miami Dolphins cornerback Nolan Carroll	
September 9, 2011	2 games	Andy Moeller	Offensive line coach	Baltimore Ravens	Violation of team rules, stemming from an arrest after driving under the influence	
March 21, 2012	Entire 2012 season	Gregg Williams	Defensive coordinator	St. Louis Rams	Involvement in the New Orleans Saints bounty program	
March 21, 2012	Entire 2012 season	Sean Payton	Head coach	New Orleans Saints	Involvement in the New Orleans Saints bounty program	
March 21, 2012	6 games	Joe Vitt	Asst. head coach	New Orleans Saints	Involvement in the New Orleans Saints bounty program	
July 18, 2014	3 games	Mike Priefer	Special teams coordinator	Minnesota Vikings	Allegations of homophobic remarks	
August 2, 2015	6 games	Aaron Kromer	Offensive line coach	Buffalo Bills	Allegations of punching a teenager	
September 7, 2015	Indefinite	Andy Moeller	Offensive line coach	Cleveland Browns	Undisclosed reasons	

== Official, executive, and administrative suspensions ==
Date suspended	Suspension length	Name	Position	Team at the time of suspension	Reason	Reference
December 10, 1968	1 game, ineligible for 1968 postseason	Norm Schachter	Referee	—N/a	Lost track of downs near the end of a Bears-Rams game	
December 10, 1968	1 game, ineligible for 1968 postseason	Joe Connell	Umpire	—N/a	Lost track of downs near the end of a Bears-Rams game	
December 10, 1968	1 game, ineligible for 1968 postseason	Burl Toler	Head linesman	—N/a	Lost track of downs near the end of a Bears-Rams game	
December 10, 1968	1 game, ineligible for 1968 postseason	Jack Fette	Line judge	—N/a	Lost track of downs near the end of a Bears-Rams game	
December 10, 1968	1 game, ineligible for 1968 postseason	Adrian Burke	Back judge	—N/a	Lost track of downs near the end of a Bears-Rams game	
December 10, 1968	1 game, ineligible for 1968 postseason	George Ellis	Field judge	—N/a	Lost track of downs near the end of a Bears-Rams game	
October 1977	2 games	Gerry Hart	Umpire	—N/a	Failure to allow the game's final play to be set in motion	
December 1980	1980 postseason	Dale Hamer	Head linesman	—N/a	Allowing a fumble return to stand, even though a penalty was committed during the play	
December 1980	1980 postseason	Bama Glass	Line judge	—N/a	Allowing a fumble return to stand, even though a penalty was committed during the play	
November 1984	1 game	Jack Fette	Line judge	—N/a	Poor conduct towards fans	
October 7, 1988	2 games	Armen Terzian	Replay judge	—N/a	Failure to call for a review of a safety that should have been ruled a touchback	
March 15, 1999	Entire 1999 season	Edward J. DeBartolo Jr.	Owner	San Francisco 49ers	Involvement in a Louisiana gambling scandal	
March 21, 2012	8 games	Mickey Loomis	General manager	New Orleans Saints	Involvement in the New Orleans Saints bounty program	
November 22, 2013	1 game	Roy Ellison	Umpire	—N/a	Use of profanity against Washington Redskins offensive tackle Trent Williams	
September 2, 2014	6 games	Jim Irsay	Owner	Indianapolis Colts	Driving under the influence of oxycodone and hydrocodone	
March 30, 2015	4 games	Ray Farmer	General manager	Cleveland Browns	Sending texts to Browns personnel during games in 2014, which violated the league's electronic device policy	
May 6, 2015	4 months (1 game)	John Jastremski	Assistant equipment handler	New England Patriots	Involvement in the Deflategate scandal	
May 6, 2015	4 months (1 game)	Jim McNally	Gameday attendant	New England Patriots	Involvement in the Deflategate scandal	
October 15, 2015	1 game	Rob Vernatchi	Side judge	—N/a	Failure to recognize an errant 18-second runoff in the fourth quarter of a Steelers-Chargers game	
July 17, 2018	5 games	Steve Keim	General manager	Arizona Cardinals	Pleading guilty to a DUI charge	
December 14, 2018	1 game	Roy Ellison	Umpire	—N/a	Confrontation with Bills player Jerry Hughes, placed on administrative leave, then fined one game check	
August 2, 2022	11 weeks	Stephen Ross	Owner	Miami Dolphins	Tampering with Tom Brady and Sean Payton following a six-month investigation stemming from Brian Flores' racial discrimination lawsuit against the league	
October 5, 2026	1 game	Adrian Hill	Referee	—N/a	Separate incidents of unprofessional conduct toward players during Week 4 games	
October 5, 2026	2 games	Jeff Seeman	Line judge	—N/a	Separate incidents of unprofessional conduct toward players during Week 4 games	

== See also ==
- Doping in American football
- NFL controversies
- NFL player conduct controversy
- List of Major League Baseball players suspended for performance-enhancing drugs
- List of people banned from Major League Baseball
- List of people banned or suspended by the NBA
