= Antonio Hamilton =

American football player (born 1993)

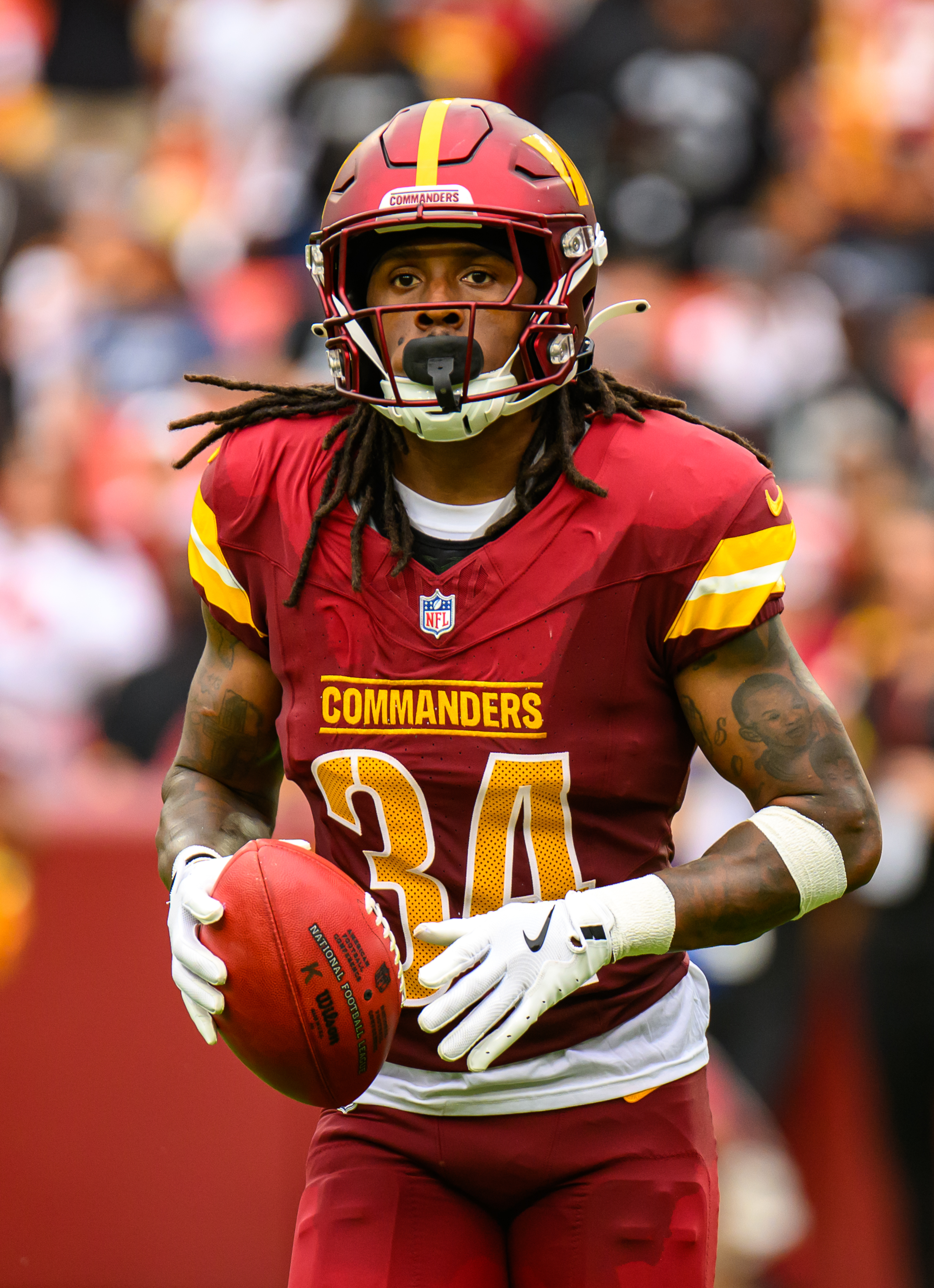
- Hamilton with the Washington Commanders in 2025

Profile
- Position: Cornerback

Personal information
- Born: January 24, 1993 (age 33); Johnston, South Carolina, U.S.
- Listed height: 6 ft 0 in (1.83 m)
- Listed weight: 188 lb (85 kg)

Career information
- High school: Strom Thurmond (Johnston)
- College: South Carolina State (2012–2015)
- NFL draft: 2016: undrafted

Career history
- Oakland Raiders (2016–2017); New York Giants (2018–2019); Kansas City Chiefs (2020); Tampa Bay Buccaneers (2021)*; Arizona Cardinals (2021–2023); Atlanta Falcons (2024); Washington Commanders (2025)
- * Offseason or practice squad member only

Career NFL statistics as of 2025
- Tackles: 197
- Fumble recoveries: 2
- Pass deflections: 27
- Interceptions: 2
- Stats at Pro Football Reference

Antonio Hamilton Sr. (born January 24, 1993) is an American professional football cornerback. He played college football for the South Carolina State Bulldogs. Hamilton signed with the Oakland Raiders as an undrafted free agent in 2016 and has also been a member of several other NFL teams.

== College career ==
Hamilton attended South Carolina State University. While there he played for three seasons in a total of 33 games. He recorded 73 tackles, one sack, four interceptions, and nine passes defensed. In addition, he recorded 33 kickoff returns for 818 yards and two touchdowns as well as 23 punt returns for 498 yards and two touchdowns. As a junior, he earned All-Conference honors as a return specialist.

== Professional career ==
Pre-draft measurables
Height	Weight	Arm length	Hand span	Wingspan	40-yard dash	10-yard split	20-yard split	20-yard shuttle	Three-cone drill	Vertical jump	Broad jump	Bench press
5 ft 11 7/8 in (1.83 m)	188 lb (85 kg)	30 in (0.76 m)	8 1/4 in (0.21 m)	6 ft 2 1/4 in (1.89 m)	4.46 s	1.55 s	2.64 s	4.27 s	6.97 s	38.0 in (0.97 m)	11 ft 0 in (3.35 m)	14 reps
All values from South Carolina State Pro Day

=== Oakland Raiders ===
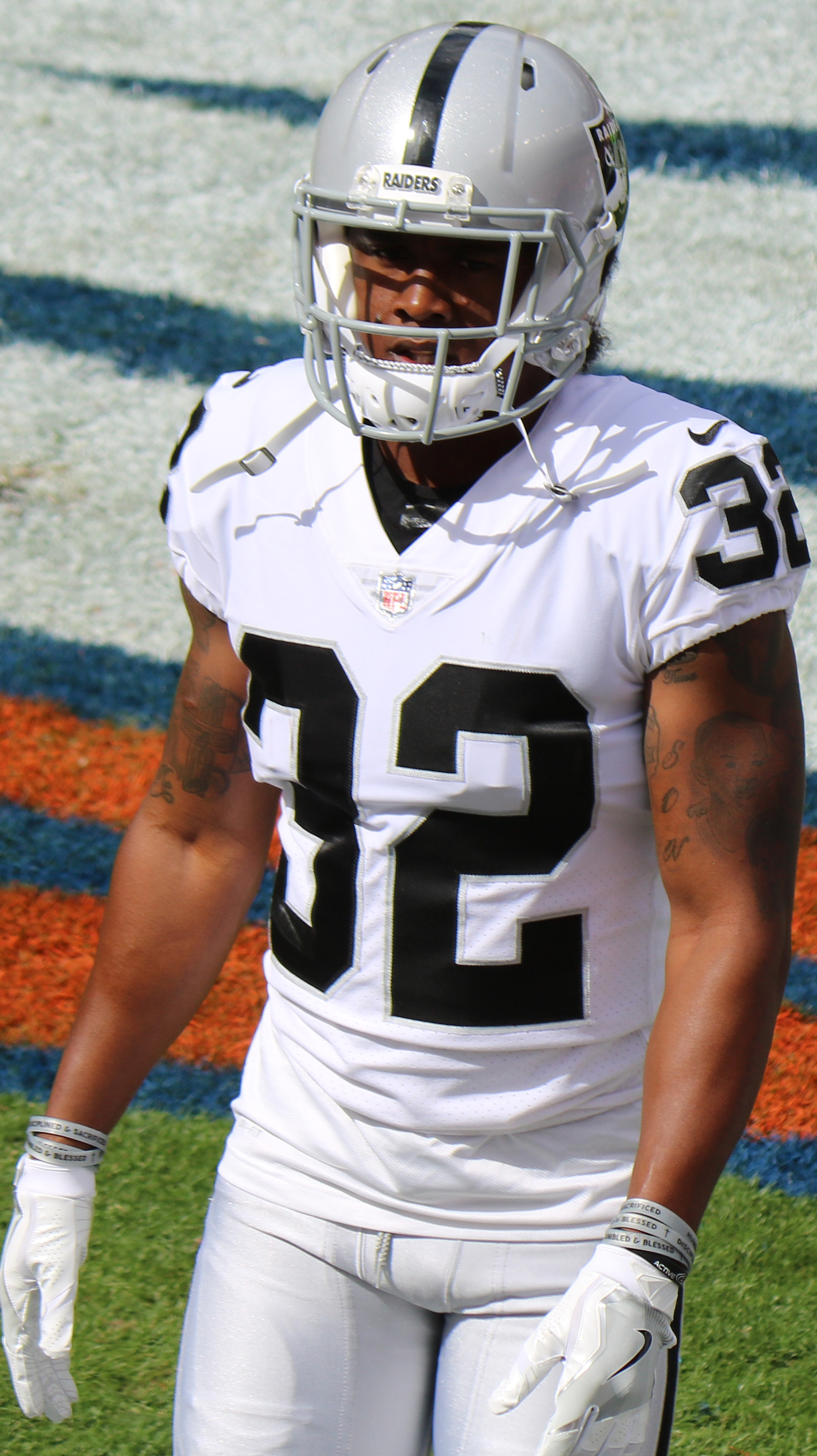
Hamilton with the Oakland Raiders in 2017

Hamilton was signed by the Oakland Raiders as an undrafted free agent on May 10, 2016.

On October 14, 2017, Hamilton was placed on injured reserve with a knee injury. He was activated off injured reserve to the active roster on December 15, 2017.

On September 1, 2018, Hamilton was waived by the Raiders.

=== New York Giants ===
On September 2, 2018, Hamilton was claimed off waivers by the New York Giants. He played in 13 games before being placed on injured reserve on December 18, 2018, with a quad injury.

On March 14, 2019, Hamilton re-signed with the Giants.

=== Kansas City Chiefs ===
Hamilton signed with the Kansas City Chiefs on March 23, 2020.

=== Tampa Bay Buccaneers ===
On May 17, 2021, Hamilton signed with the Tampa Bay Buccaneers. On August 30, 2021, he was released as part of final roster cuts.

=== Arizona Cardinals ===
On September 3, 2021, Hamilton was signed to the practice squad of the Arizona Cardinals. He was promoted to the active roster on September 29, 2021.

On April 26, 2022, Hamilton re-signed with the Cardinals. He was placed on the reserve/non-football injury list on September 1, 2022. He was activated on October 8.

On March 21, 2023, Hamilton re-signed with the Cardinals.

=== Atlanta Falcons ===
On April 4, 2024, Hamilton signed with the Atlanta Falcons. He played in 11 games in 2024, primarily on special teams.

=== Washington Commanders ===
On August 11, 2025, Hamilton signed with the Washington Commanders. He was waived on August 26, and re-signed with their practice squad the following day. On October 1, the Commanders signed Hamilton to the active roster.

Hamilton re-signed with the Commanders on May 11, 2026. On August 30, he was waived by the Commanders as a part of final roster cuts before the start of the regular season.
