= Braylon Staley =

American football player (born 2006)

No. 14 – Tennessee Volunteers
- Position: Wide receiver
- Class: Redshirt Sophomore

Personal information
- Born: April 27, 2006 (age 20); Augusta, Georgia, U.S.
- Listed height: 6 ft 0 in (1.83 m)
- Listed weight: 190 lb (86 kg)

Career information
- High school: Strom Thurmond (Johnston, South Carolina)
- College: Tennessee (2024–present)

Awards and highlights
- SEC Freshman of the Year (2025)
- Stats at ESPN

Braylon Thomas Staley (born April 27, 2006) is an American college football wide receiver for the Tennessee Volunteers.

== Early life ==
Staley attended Aiken High School in Aiken, South Carolina for three years before transferring to Strom Thurmond High School in Johnston, South Carolina for his senior year of high school football. As a senior, he was the Upper State Offensive Player of the Year and Region 3-2A Player of the Year after recording 69 receptions for 1,116 yards and 14 touchdowns. Staley committed to the University of Tennessee to play college football.

== College career ==
In his first year at Tennessee in 2024, Staley was redshirted after playing in four games and recording three receptions for 21 yards. He entered his redshirt freshman season in 2025, earning more playing time.
