= Jakar Hamilton =

American football player (born 1989)

No. 23
- Position: Safety

Personal information
- Born: October 2, 1989 (age 37); Johnston, South Carolina, U.S.
- Listed height: 6 ft 0 in (1.83 m)
- Listed weight: 208 lb (94 kg)

Career information
- High school: Strom Thurmond (Johnston)
- College: South Carolina State
- NFL draft: 2013: undrafted

Career history
- Dallas Cowboys (2013–2014)

Career NFL statistics
- Games played: 4
- Total tackles: 2
- Stats at Pro Football Reference

Jakar Michael Hamilton (born October 2, 1989) is an American former professional football player who was a safety in the National Football League (NFL) for the Dallas Cowboys. He played college football for the South Carolina State Bulldogs.

== Early life ==
Hamilton attended Strom Thurmond High School in Johnston, South Carolina. As a senior, he scored 20 touchdowns, while helping his team win the Class AAA State Championship. He also practiced basketball.

== College career ==
He enrolled at Georgia Military College in Milledgeville, Georgia. He was a starter, registering 88 tackles and 6 sacks. After being named a NJCAA All-American, he had offers from Alabama, Auburn, Georgia, Illinois, North Carolina State, and West Virginia. In a signing day event in which his whole family was in attendance, he chose to attend the University of Georgia.

As a sophomore, he started 5 out of 13 games, posting 27 tackles, one quarterback hurry, one interception and 2 passes defensed.

As a junior, he received a medical redshirt after suffering a stress fracture in his lower right leg. He was a recipient of the Jeff & Stacey Rothenberger Family Football Scholarship. He also earned the Athletic Director's Honor Roll distinction for the spring semester. He was the recipient of the James E. Farish Football Scholarship in 2011. He decided to transfer to South Carolina State University for his senior season.

As a senior, he tallied 40 tackles (seventh on the team), 3 passes defended and returned 7 kickoffs for 218 yards and one touchdown.

== Professional career ==
Hamilton was signed as an undrafted free agent by the Dallas Cowboys after the 2013 NFL draft on April 27. He was waived on August 31, but he was signed to the practice squad the next day. On October 26, he was promoted to the active roster following an injury to safety J. J. Wilcox. He appeared in three games and registered 3 tackles, with most of his playing time coming in the fourth quarter against the Detroit Lions (eighth game of the season).

On August 28, 2014, it was announced that Hamilton would be suspended for four games after he missed a drug test in the offseason. During training camp he suffered hamstring and concussion injuries that limited his playing time. He was activated from the reserve/suspended list on September 29, proceeding to be declared inactive for 9 games and active for one game in which he didn't play.

Hamilton was released on January 10, 2015, to make room for Ken Bishop on the active roster for the playoffs. On July 13, it was announced in the media that he was suspended by the NFL for 10 games.

== Personal life ==
Hamilton has an older brother, Mike Goodson who played for the Carolina Panthers, Oakland Raiders and New York Jets. His younger brother, Demetri Goodson was a cornerback for and now serves as a College Scout for the Green Bay Packers. His younger brother Antonio Hamilton, also played at South Carolina State University and is now a cornerback for the Arizona Cardinals. His younger sister, Talayah Hamilton, is a women’s basketball player at Alabama State University.
