= Strom Thurmond High School =

School in Johnston, South Carolina, United States

Location
- 1131 Columbia Road; Johnston, South Carolina, Edgefield County, South Carolina 29832; United States; 33°48′27″N 81°51′51″W

Information
- School type: Public High School
- Motto: Invincible Spirit
- Established: 1961 (65 years ago)
- School district: Edgefield County School District
- CEEB code: 410700
- Principal: Kristen Risher
- Grades: 9–12
- Enrollment: 776 (2023-2024)
- Student to teacher ratio: 16.89
- Colors: Red, white, and navy blue
- Team name: Rebels
- Website: sths.edgefield.k12.sc.us

Strom Thurmond High School (STHS) is a four year high school located in Johnston, a town in Edgefield County, South Carolina, United States. It is named for Strom Thurmond, who served as Governor of South Carolina (1947–1951), and was an eight-term senator from South Carolina (1954–1956 and 1956–2003). The athletic teams are called the Rebels. The Rebels are the current 2A state football champions.

== Notable alumni ==
- Antonio Hamilton, National Football League (NFL) player
- Jakar Hamilton, NFL player
- Childish Major, musician
- Braylon Staley, college football wide receiver
