= Ego Ferguson =

American football player (born 1991)

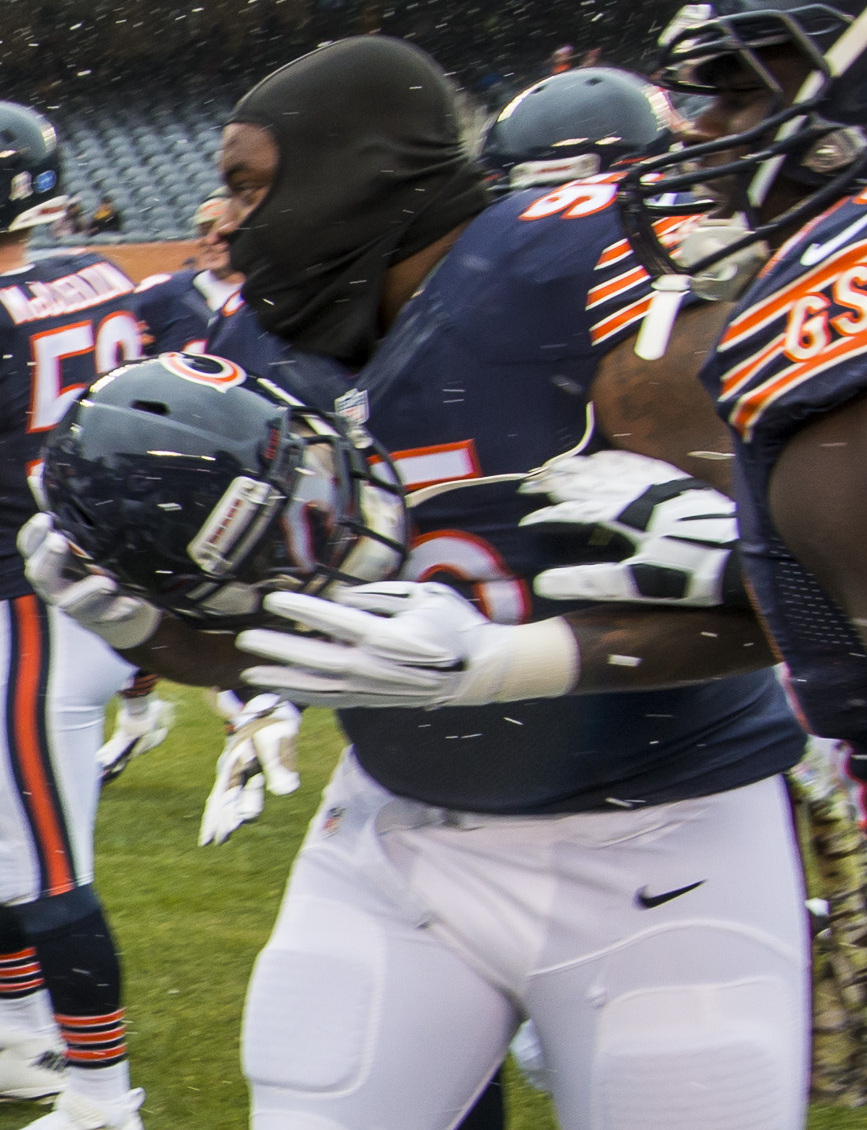
- Ferguson with the Chicago Bears in 2014

No. 95
- Position: Defensive tackle

Personal information
- Born: September 22, 1991 (age 35); Miami, Florida, U.S.
- Listed height: 6 ft 3 in (1.91 m)
- Listed weight: 315 lb (143 kg)

Career information
- High school: Hargrave Military (Chatham, Virginia)
- College: LSU
- NFL draft: 2014: 2nd round, 51st overall pick

Career history
- Chicago Bears (2014–2016); Green Bay Packers (2017)*; Detroit Lions (2017)*
- * Offseason or practice squad member only

Career NFL statistics
- Total tackles: 27
- Sacks: 2.0
- Stats at Pro Football Reference

Ego Ferguson (born September 22, 1991) is an American former professional football player who was a defensive tackle in the National Football League (NFL). He played college football for the LSU Tigers and was selected by the Chicago Bears in the second round of the 2014 NFL draft. He was also a member of the Green Bay Packers and Detroit Lions.

== Early life ==
A native of Miami, Florida, but raised in Mims, Florida, Ferguson originally attended Saint John's Catholic Prep in Frederick, Maryland, before transferring to Hargrave Military Academy in Chatham, Virginia, for his senior year of high school. Regarded as a four-star recruit by Rivals.com, Ferguson was ranked as the sixth best strong-side defensive end prospect in the class of 2010, behind top-ranked prospect Jackson Jeffcoat and third-ranked prospect William Gholston. Ferguson was ranked seventh-best defensive end prospect in the country by Scout.com. After official visits to LSU, Notre Dame, California, Florida State, and Miami, Ferguson committed to the LSU Tigers to play college football under head coach Les Miles.

== College career ==
At LSU, Ferguson was redshirted as a true freshman. After two years as a backup, Ferguson replaced Bennie Logan at the right defensive tackle position. Ferguson announced on January 3, 2014 that he would forgo his senior season and enter the 2014 NFL draft. Ferguson earned honorable mention All-Southeastern Conference (SEC) honors as a junior in 2013.

== Professional career ==
Pre-draft measurables
Height	Weight	Arm length	Hand span	Bench press
6 ft 2 in (1.88 m)	315 lb (143 kg)	32 1/2 in (0.83 m)	10 3/4 in (0.27 m)	24 reps
All values from NFL Combine

=== Chicago Bears ===
On May 9, 2014, Ferguson was drafted in the second round by the Chicago Bears with the 51st overall pick of the 2014 NFL draft. He signed a four-year contract on May 13, 2014. Ferguson made his NFL debut on September 7, 2014, versus the Buffalo Bills. In 2015, Ferguson appeared in four games before being placed on injured reserve with a knee injury. On November 12, 2015, Ferguson was hit by the NFL with a four-game suspension for violating the league's policy for performance-enhancing drugs. Ferguson was waived/injured and placed on injured reserve before the start of the 2016 NFL season after sustaining a shoulder injury in the Bears' preseason finale that required season-ending surgery.

On March 31, 2017, Ferguson was released by the Bears.

=== Green Bay Packers ===
On April 3, 2017, Ferguson was claimed off waivers by the Green Bay Packers. He was waived by the Packers two days later after a failed physical.

=== Detroit Lions ===
On June 8, 2017, Ferguson signed with the Detroit Lions. On September 2, 2017, he was waived by the Lions.

=== Season statistics ===
			Tackles			Sacks	Fumbles				Interceptions					Other					Ref.
Year	Team	GP	COMB	SOLO	AST	SACK	FF	FR	Fum YDs	TD	INT	Int YDs	AVG	LNG	TD	PD	STF	STF YDS	SFTY	KB	Ref.
2014	CHI	16	24	12	12	2.0	0	0	0	0	0	0	0	0	0	3	0	0	0	0	
2015	CHI	4	3	1	2	0.0	0	0	0	0	0	0	0	0	0	0	0	0	0	0	
2016	CHI	0	0	0	0	0.0	0	0	0	0	0	0	0	0	0	0	0	0	0	0	
