= Demetri Goodson =

American football player and executive (born 1989)

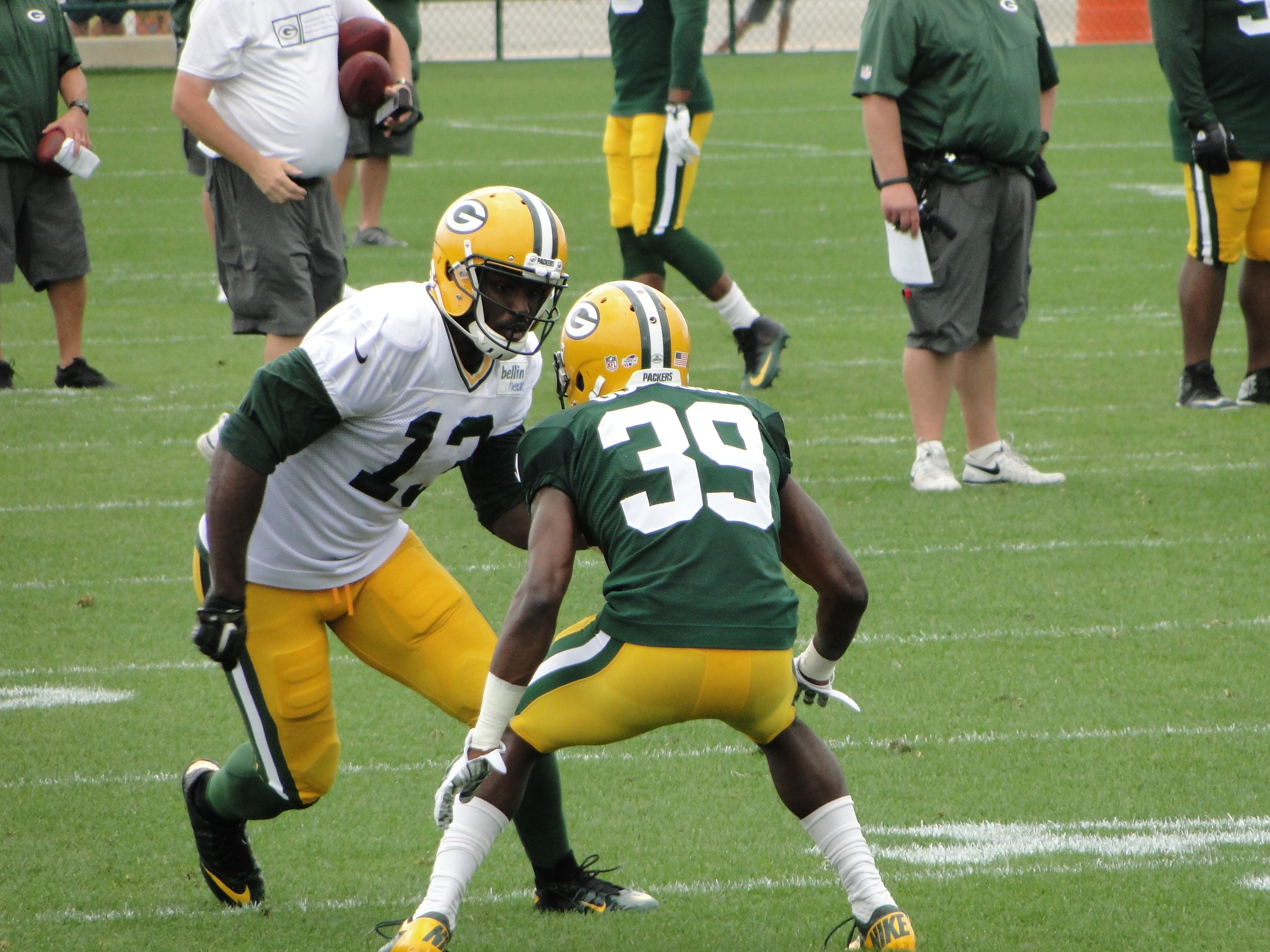
- Chris Harper (left) and Goodson, 2014

Green Bay Packers
- Title: College scout

Personal information
- Born: June 11, 1989 (age 37); Charlestown, West Virginia, U.S.
- Listed height: 5 ft 11 in (1.80 m)
- Listed weight: 197 lb (89 kg)

Career information
- Position: Cornerback (No. 39)
- High school: Klein Collins (Spring, Texas)
- College: Baylor
- NFL draft: 2014: 6th round, 197th overall pick

Career history

Playing
- Green Bay Packers (2014–2017); New Orleans Saints (2018)

Operations
- Green Bay Packers (2019–2020) Scouting intern; Green Bay Packers (2020–present) College scout

Career NFL statistics
- Total tackles: 30
- Pass deflections: 2
- Stats at Pro Football Reference

Demetri Quarte Goodson (born June 11, 1989) is an American professional football scout and former cornerback who is a college scout for the Green Bay Packers of the National Football League (NFL). He played college football for the Baylor Bears. Goodson was selected by the Packers in the sixth round of the 2014 NFL draft.

== Early life ==
Demetri Quarte Goodson was born on June 11, 1989, in Charlestown, West Virginia. He attended Klein Collins High School in Spring, Texas.

== College career ==
Goodson attended Baylor University, where he played on the Baylor Bears football team from 2011 to 2013 after transferring from Gonzaga University. From 2008 to 2011, he played on the Gonzaga Bulldogs men's basketball team. As a senior at Baylor in 2013, Goodson had 26 total tackles, three interceptions, and 16 pass breakups.

== Professional career ==
External videos
- Goodson's NFL Combine workout

Pre-draft measurables
Height	Weight	Arm length	Hand span	40-yard dash	10-yard split	20-yard split	20-yard shuttle	Three-cone drill	Vertical jump	Broad jump	Bench press	Wonderlic
5 ft 11 in (1.80 m)	194 lb (88 kg)	31 3/4 in (0.81 m)	9 1/4 in (0.23 m)	4.52 s	1.62 s	2.67 s	4.34 s	6.80 s	37 in (0.94 m)	10 ft 3 in (3.12 m)	11 reps	17
All values are from NFL Combine

=== Green Bay Packers ===
Goodson was selected in the sixth round (197th overall) by the Green Bay Packers in the 2014 NFL draft, becoming the first Baylor player to be drafted by the team since Rell Tipton in 1977. On May 16, 2014, Goodson signed a contract with the Packers.

On April 8, 2016, Goodson was suspended by the NFL for the first four games of the 2016 season for violating the league's policy on performance-enhancing substances. In Week 11, Goodson was carted off the field with a knee injury and was placed on injured reserve on December 3, 2016.

Goodson was placed on the physically unable to perform list to start the 2017 due to the knee injury. He was activated off PUP on December 6, 2017. He then suffered a hamstring injury which kept him out two games before being placed on injured reserve on December 22, 2017, without playing a game in 2017.

On September 1, 2018, Goodson was released by the Packers.

=== New Orleans Saints ===
On October 4, 2018, Goodson was signed by the New Orleans Saints. He was released on October 17, 2018.

== Scouting career ==
Goodson started his scouting career as an intern for the Green Bay Packers. He was promoted to Midwest Region scout to fill the void of Brandian Ross who was promoted to Southeast region scout.

== Career statistics ==
=== NFL ===
Year	Team	GP	GS	Tackles					Interceptions						Fumbles	
Year	Team	GP	GS	Total	Solo	Ast	Sck	SFTY	PDef	Int	Yds	Avg	Lng	TDs	FF	FR
2014	GB	6	0	6	5	1	0.0	0	0	0	0	0.0	0	0	0	0
2015	GB	14	0	10	7	3	0.0	0	1	0	0	0.0	0	0	0	0
2016	GB	6	3	14	10	4	0.0	0	1	0	0	0.0	0	0	0	0
2017	GB	Did not play due to injury														
Total		26	3	30	22	8	0.0	0	2	0	0	0.0	0	0	0	0
Source: NFL.com

=== College ===
Year	Team	G	GS	Tackles					Interceptions						Fumbles	
Year	Team	G	GS	Total	Solo	Ast	Sck	SFTY	PDef	Int	Yds	Avg	Lng	TDs	FF	FR
2011	BAY	4	0	1	1	0	0.0	0	0	0	0	0.0	0	0	0	0
2012	BAY	4	3	16	15	1	0.0	0	3	1	14	14.0	14	0	0	0
2013	BAY	11	10	26	22	4	0.0	0	16	3	63	21.0	42	0	0	0
Total		19	13	43	38	5	0.0	0	19	4	77	19.3	42	0	0	0
Source: BaylorBears.com

== Personal life ==
Demetri is married to Linsey Goodson and they have one son. He is the younger brother of Mike Goodson, who played for the Carolina Panthers, Oakland Raiders, and New York Jets. He also has a half-brother, Jakar Hamilton who played for the Dallas Cowboys.
