= Johnston, South Carolina =

- Town
- Location in Edgefield County, South Carolina

- Location in South Carolina Location in the United States
- Coordinates: 33°49′55″N 81°48′8″W
- Country: United States
- State: South Carolina
- County: Edgefield

Government
  - Type: Mayor-Council
  - Mayor: Terrence D. Culbreath

Area
  - Total: 2.73 sq mi (7.08 km^{2})
  - Land: 2.65 sq mi (6.86 km^{2})
  - Water: 0.085 sq mi (0.22 km^{2})
- Elevation: 663 ft (202 m)

Population (2020)
  - Total: 1,997
  - Density: 754.2/sq mi (291.21/km^{2})
- Time zone: UTC-5 (EST)
  - Summer (DST): UTC-4 (EDT)
- ZIP code: 29832
- Area codes: 803, 839
- FIPS code: 45-37150
- GNIS feature ID: 1246191
- Website: townofjohnstonsc.gov

Johnston is a town in Edgefield County, South Carolina, United States. As of the 2020 census, Johnston had a population of 1,997. It is part of the Augusta, Georgia, metropolitan area. The town's official welcome sign states that it is "Peach Capital of the World".

== History ==
Johnston is called The Hub of the Ridge because it is located at the meeting place of the three river systems which flow away from the Ridge, a fertile plateau about 30 miles (48 km) long between clay hills to the north and sand hills to the south. The area has been settled since the mid-1700s. In 1791 as George Washington traveled through the area on his triumphal tour through the country, he stopped at the Lott family plantation, just east of Johnston.

In the late 1860s, the Charlotte, Columbia and Augusta Railroad expanded westward from Columbia to Augusta. Edward Jones Mims, M.D., persuaded William Johnston, president of the railroad, to run the railroad through the 1,200-acre (490 ha) Mims plantation. In return, Dr. Mims agreed to name the new town for Mr. Johnston.

In the early 1900s, the peach industry became successful in this area. Today, the Ridge produces about 60 percent of South Carolina's peaches. Johnston is proclaimed to be the "Peach Capital of the World."

== Geography ==
Johnston is located in eastern Edgefield County at 33°49′55″N 81°48′8″W (33.831927, -81.802304). South Carolina Highway 23 passes through the center of town as Calhoun Street, leading southwest 8 miles (13 km) to Edgefield, the county seat, and northeast 4.5 miles (7.2 km) to Ward. South Carolina Highway 121 (Lee Street) crosses SC 23 at the town center, leading north 12 miles (19 km) to Saluda and south 7 miles (11 km) to Trenton.

According to the United States Census Bureau, the town has a total area of 2.7 square miles (7.1 km^{2}), of which 2.7 square miles (6.9 km^{2}) is land and 0.1 square miles (0.2 km^{2}), or 3.15%, is water.

=== Climate ===
Johnston has a humid subtropical climate (Köppen Cfa) with long, hot summers and short, mild winters.

Climate data for Johnston (1991–2020 normals, extremes 1957–present)
Month	Jan	Feb	Mar	Apr	May	Jun	Jul	Aug	Sep	Oct	Nov	Dec	Year
Record high °F (°C)	81 (27)	83 (28)	89 (32)	94 (34)	100 (38)	106 (41)	111 (44)	110 (43)	105 (41)	96 (36)	89 (32)	81 (27)	111 (44)
Mean maximum °F (°C)	72.6 (22.6)	76.5 (24.7)	82.5 (28.1)	88.2 (31.2)	94.4 (34.7)	99.2 (37.3)	100.8 (38.2)	100.3 (37.9)	96.0 (35.6)	88.1 (31.2)	80.6 (27.0)	74.6 (23.7)	102.4 (39.1)
Mean daily maximum °F (°C)	55.4 (13.0)	59.2 (15.1)	66.9 (19.4)	75.6 (24.2)	83.4 (28.6)	89.7 (32.1)	93.0 (33.9)	90.8 (32.7)	85.5 (29.7)	75.9 (24.4)	65.8 (18.8)	57.9 (14.4)	74.9 (23.9)
Daily mean °F (°C)	44.0 (6.7)	47.2 (8.4)	53.9 (12.2)	62.1 (16.7)	70.3 (21.3)	77.4 (25.2)	80.9 (27.2)	79.3 (26.3)	73.9 (23.3)	63.4 (17.4)	53.1 (11.7)	46.4 (8.0)	62.7 (17.0)
Mean daily minimum °F (°C)	32.7 (0.4)	35.2 (1.8)	40.9 (4.9)	48.6 (9.2)	57.3 (14.1)	65.2 (18.4)	68.6 (20.3)	67.9 (19.9)	62.3 (16.8)	51.0 (10.6)	40.4 (4.7)	34.9 (1.6)	50.4 (10.2)
Mean minimum °F (°C)	14.6 (−9.7)	18.7 (−7.4)	24.1 (−4.4)	33.1 (0.6)	42.7 (5.9)	54.9 (12.7)	60.8 (16.0)	59.0 (15.0)	49.1 (9.5)	34.1 (1.2)	25.2 (−3.8)	19.6 (−6.9)	12.9 (−10.6)
Record low °F (°C)	−2 (−19)	8 (−13)	1 (−17)	19 (−7)	34 (1)	46 (8)	52 (11)	46 (8)	36 (2)	24 (−4)	15 (−9)	3 (−16)	−2 (−19)
Average precipitation inches (mm)	4.23 (107)	3.94 (100)	4.51 (115)	3.18 (81)	3.21 (82)	5.12 (130)	4.64 (118)	4.96 (126)	3.97 (101)	2.98 (76)	3.31 (84)	4.42 (112)	48.47 (1,232)
Average snowfall inches (cm)	0.5 (1.3)	0.1 (0.25)	0.2 (0.51)	0.0 (0.0)	0.0 (0.0)	0.0 (0.0)	0.0 (0.0)	0.0 (0.0)	0.0 (0.0)	0.0 (0.0)	0.0 (0.0)	0.2 (0.51)	1.0 (2.5)
Average precipitation days (≥ 0.01 in)	11.6	10.5	10.7	8.4	8.0	10.4	10.9	10.7	9.0	7.6	9.0	12.1	118.9
Average snowy days (≥ 0.1 in)	0.2	0.1	0.0	0.0	0.0	0.0	0.0	0.0	0.0	0.0	0.0	0.0	0.3
Source: NOAA

== Demographics ==
=== 2000 census ===
Historical population
Census	Pop.	Note	%±
1880	463		—
1890	827		78.6%
1900	865		4.6%
1910	943		9.0%
1920	1,101		16.8%
1930	1,072		−2.6%
1940	1,100		2.6%
1950	1,426		29.6%
1960	2,119		48.6%
1970	2,552		20.4%
1980	2,624		2.8%
1990	2,688		2.4%
2000	2,336		−13.1%
2010	2,362		1.1%
2020	1,997		−15.5%
U.S. Decennial Census

As of the census of 2000, there were 2,473 people, 923 households, and 635 families residing in the town. The population density was 930.6 inhabitants per square mile (359.3/km^{2}). There were 1,012 housing units at an average density of 403.2 per square mile (155.7/km^{2}). The racial makeup of the town was 35.92% White, 62.63% African American, 0.26% Native American, 0.13% Asian, 0.39% from other races, and 0.68% from two or more races. Hispanic or Latino of any race were 1.33% of the population.

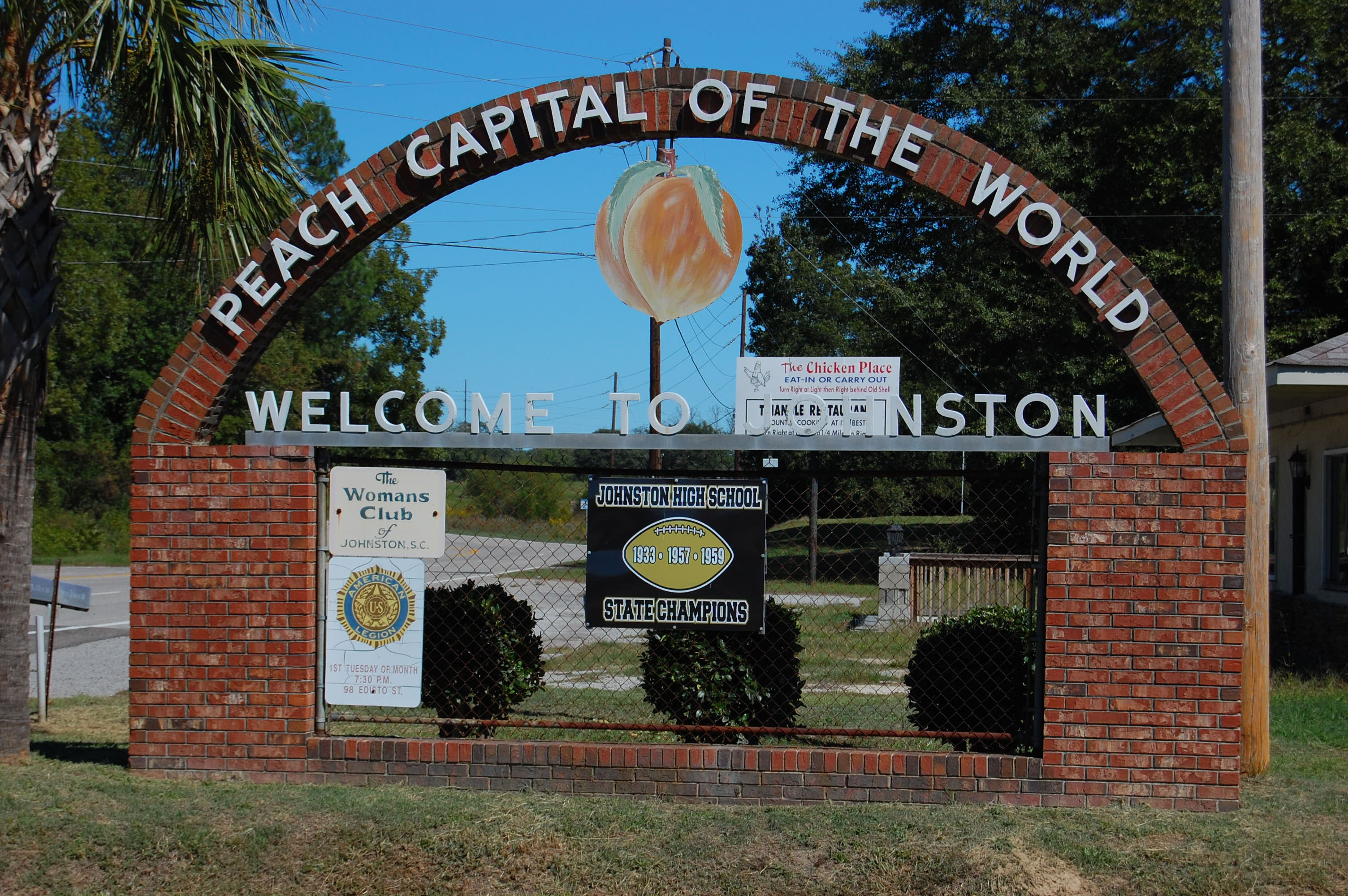
The official welcome sign

There were 923 households, out of which 30.0% had children under the age of 18 living with them, 41.6% were married couples living together, 22.6% had a female householder with no husband present, and 31.2% were non-families. 28.5% of all households were made up of individuals, and 12.4% had someone living alone who was 65 years of age or older. The average household size was 2.53 and the average family size was 3.12.

In the town, the population was spread out, with 27.1% under the age of 18, 9.4% from 18 to 24, 26.7% from 25 to 44, 21.6% from 45 to 64, and 15.2% who were 65 years of age or older. The median age was 36 years. For every 100 females, there were 88.2 males. For every 100 females age 18 and over, there were 82.1 males.

The median income for a household in the town was $25,570, and the median income for a family was $29,531. Males had a median income of $25,521 versus $19,572 for females. The per capita income for the town was $12,671. About 21.2% of families and 23.9% of the population were below the poverty line, including 28.9% of those under age 18 and 20.8% of those age 65 or over.

=== 2010 census ===
According to the 2010 census, the town had a population of 2,362. Of which, 1,481 (62.70%) were Black or African American, 845 (35.77%) were White, 18 (0.76%) were two or more races, 11 (0.47%) were some other race, 4 (0.17%) were Asian, 3 (0.13%) were American Indian or Alaska Native. 43 (1.82%) were Hispanic or Latino of any race.

=== 2020 census ===
Johnston racial composition
Race	Num.	Perc.
White (non-Hispanic)	596	29.84%
Black or African American (non-Hispanic)	1,250	62.59%
Native American	1	0.05%
Asian	16	0.8%
Other/Mixed	56	2.8%
Hispanic or Latino	78	3.91%

As of the 2020 United States census, there were 1,997 people, 811 households, and 531 families residing in the town.

== Education ==
Johnston Elementary School is part of the Edgefield County School District and serves grades K-5. Other schools include Strom Thurmond High School, Johnston-Edgefield- Trenton (JET) Middle School, W.E.Parker Elementary Schools, and a private school called Francis Hugh Wardlaw Academy.

Johnston has a public library, a branch of the ABBE Regional Library System.
